= 1996–97 Mighty Ducks of Anaheim season =

NHL team season

1996–97 Mighty Ducks of Anaheim
- Division: 2nd Pacific
- Conference: 4th Western
- 1996–97 record: 36–33–13
- Home record: 23–12–6
- Road record: 13–21–7
- Goals for: 245
- Goals against: 233

Team information
- General manager: Jack Ferreira
- Coach: Ron Wilson
- Captain: Paul Kariya
- Alternate captains: Bobby Dollas; Teemu Selanne
- Arena: Arrowhead Pond of Anaheim
- Average attendance: 16,972
- Minor league affiliate: Baltimore Bandits (AHL)

Team leaders
- Goals: Teemu Selanne (51)
- Assists: Teemu Selanne (58)
- Points: Teemu Selanne (109)
- Penalty minutes: Warren Rychel (218)
- Plus/minus: Paul Kariya (+36)
- Wins: Guy Hebert (29)
- Goals against average: Guy Hebert (2.67)

The 1996–97 Mighty Ducks of Anaheim season was the fourth season in franchise history. The team qualified for the Stanley Cup playoffs for the first time in franchise history.

== Offseason ==
Forward Paul Kariya was named team captain, following the retirement of defenseman Randy Ladouceur.

The Ducks only made one trade in the summer as the team looked good enough for the future following last season's late run, trading Mike Maneluk to the Ottawa Senators for Kevin Brown on July 1. Just before the season started Anaheim made another deal with Ottawa, trading Shaun Van Allen and Jason York in exchange for Ted Drury and Marc Moro.

== Regular season ==
The previous season of 1995–96 the Mighty Ducks of Anaheim had just narrowly missed the playoffs after being in the chase for the first time. The team put together a run of 12-4-3 over the final two months of the season to finish even with the Winnipeg Jets at 78 points in the standings, but the Jets earned the final spot thanks to having one more win.

So the Mighty Ducks start to the 96–97 season with a month of October that saw the team go 1-9-2 including an eight-game losing streak was a huge disappointment to say the least. Anaheim was held to two or fewer goals eight times during the stretch, and the two times they exploded for six goals in a game they ended up having to settle for a tie.

With all of four points through the first month, Anaheim was bottom of the Pacific Division and the Western Conference. The division-leading Colorado Avalanche were 11 points clear, and the Los Angeles Kings held the eighth and final playoff spot six point clear of the Mighty Ducks. Over the course of the rest of the season three teams, including Anaheim, would unseat the teams in playoff positioning in the West after the first month.

The combination of Teemu Selanne and Paul Kariya was synonymous with the Mighty Ducks of the mid-late 1990s, so lacking one half of that dynamic duo at the start of the season was a major issue. Kariya missed the first 11 games of the campaign with a pulled abdominal muscle, contributing greatly the Anaheim offensive woes.

Selanne lead the team in scoring through the first month with six goals and seven assists in the 12 games, with Kevin Todd in second with four goals and seven assists. Veteran Jari Kurri, signed in the offseason from the Rangers, contributed as well with three goals and four assists, while on the backend Roman Oksiuta chipped in three goals and five assists and Fredrik Olausson had two goals and three assists.

The lack of scoring punch affected the defense as well. For the full season Anaheim averaged 28.4 shots per game while allowing 32.7, yet during the opening month the Mighty Ducks put 26.8 shots on goal per game while allowing 32.5. Anaheim averaged 2.3 goals per game during October, well below their eventual season average of 3.0, while surrendering 4.2 against per game. Goalie Guy Hebert struggled as well, posting a .874 save percentage amidst the lack of support.

Anaheim didn't immediately vault up the standings with Kariya returning to the lineup in November, but the play stabilized and the team wouldn't lose more than three straight (which happened only twice) with Kariya and Selanne reunited. The offense kicked in to gear, with the Mighty Ducks averaging 3.3 goals per game in November and 3.7 goals per game in December.

By the time the All Star break rolled around Anaheim had pulled its season record up to 17-22-5, and Selanne, Kariya, and Hebert were all named to the Western Conference All Star team, giving the Mighty Ducks their first season with multiple All Star Game representatives. Selanne posted 25 goals and 31 assists in all 44 of the Mighty Ducks' games, while Kariya had 16 goals and 28 assists in 31 games. Hebert recovered as well, backstopping Anaheim to a 13-9-3 mark in his 26 starts following October with a .928 SV% and four shutouts during the span.

In the three months that followed the abysmal opening one, the Mighty Ducks didn't immediately vault upwards standings-wise, but they began winning more than they were losing. A 6-5-2 November was built upon with a 6-5-1 December. January saw Anaheim post a 7-5-1 mark before a 6-6-1 February. With two months left in the season the Mighty Ducks sat at 26-30-7, but were primed to make their big run.

After a 3–1 loss at the Great Western Forum to Los Angeles on February 20, Anaheim began its best run of form for the season. The Mighty Ducks picked up points in 12 consecutive games, going 7-0-5 from February 22 to March 19, winning five and tying three against eventual playoff qualifiers during the stretch. Selanne and Kariya again lead the way, Selanne with 11 goals and eight assists while Kariya posted seven goals and 10 assists.

Yet Anaheim also saw significant contributions from Steve Rucchin with two goals and nine assists, Joe Sacco's two goals and six assists, and Ted Drury potting four goals and dishing two assists. The defense chipped in with Dmitri Mironov scoring three goals and adding eight assists, while Darren Van Impe had two goals and five assists. Hebert was lights-out as well, appearing in every game during the streak with a .946 SV%, and had nine games with more than 30 saves and two with more than 40.

The Mighty Ducks closed the season out with another unbeaten streak, going 5-0-2 over the final seven games. From February 22 on Anaheim went a league-best 13-3-7 to help the team sew up its first winning record, first playoff berth, and home ice against the Phoenix Coyotes in the first round. Selanne finished second in the league with 51 goals and second with 109 points, while Kariya earned Lady Byng honors with 99 points in 69 games while taking just three minor penalties.

=== Final standings ===
Pacific Division
No.	CR		GP	W	L	T	GF	GA	Pts
1	1	**Colorado Avalanche**	82	49	24	9	277	205	107
2	4	**Mighty Ducks of Anaheim**	82	36	33	13	243	231	85
3	7	**Edmonton Oilers**	82	36	37	9	252	247	81
4	9	Vancouver Canucks	82	35	40	7	257	273	77
5	10	Calgary Flames	82	32	41	9	214	239	73
6	12	Los Angeles Kings	82	28	43	11	214	268	67
7	13	San Jose Sharks	82	27	47	8	211	278	62

Note: CR = Conference rank; GP = Games played; W = Wins; L = Losses; T = Ties; GF = Goals for; GA = Goals against; Pts = Points
Bolded teams qualified for the playoffs.

Western Conference
R		Div	GP	W	L	T	GF	GA	Pts
**1**	**p – Colorado Avalanche**	**PAC**	**82**	**49**	**24**	**9**	**277**	**205**	**107**
**2**	**Dallas Stars**	**CEN**	**82**	**48**	**26**	**8**	**252**	**198**	**104**
**3**	**Detroit Red Wings**	**CEN**	**82**	**38**	**26**	**18**	**253**	**197**	**94**
**4**	**Mighty Ducks of Anaheim**	**PAC**	**82**	**36**	**33**	**13**	**245**	**233**	**85**
**5**	**Phoenix Coyotes**	**CEN**	**82**	**38**	**37**	**7**	**240**	**243**	**83**
**6**	**St. Louis Blues**	**CEN**	**82**	**36**	**35**	**11**	**236**	**239**	**83**
**7**	**Edmonton Oilers**	**PAC**	**82**	**36**	**37**	**9**	**252**	**247**	**81**
**8**	**Chicago Blackhawks**	**CEN**	**82**	**34**	**35**	**13**	**223**	**210**	**81**
9	Vancouver Canucks	PAC	82	35	40	7	257	273	77
10	Calgary Flames	PAC	82	32	41	9	214	239	73
11	Toronto Maple Leafs	CEN	82	30	44	8	230	273	68
12	Los Angeles Kings	PAC	82	28	43	11	214	268	67
13	San Jose Sharks	PAC	82	27	47	8	211	278	62

Divisions: CEN – Central, PAC – Pacific

bold – Qualified for playoffs; p – Won Presidents' Trophy

== Playoffs ==
The Mighty Ducks qualified for the playoffs for the first time. Anaheim beat Phoenix 4–3 in the 1st round but was swept in the 2nd round by eventual champion Detroit 4–0.

== Schedule and results ==
=== Regular season ===
1996–97 regular season
October: 1–9–2 (home: 0–5–0; road: 1–4–2)

Game	Date	Score	Opponent	Record	Recap
1	October 5, 1996	1–4	@ Toronto Maple Leafs (1996–97)	0–1–0	L
2	October 7, 1996	6–6 OT	@ Montreal Canadiens (1996–97)	0–1–1	T
3	October 9, 1996	2–0	@ Chicago Blackhawks (1996–97)	1–1–1	W
4	October 10, 1996	6–6 OT	@ Colorado Avalanche (1996–97)	1–1–2	T
5	October 12, 1996	2–4	@ Phoenix Coyotes (1996–97)	1–2–2	L
6	October 16, 1996	3–4	Philadelphia Flyers (1996–97)	1–3–2	L
7	October 18, 1996	1–4	San Jose Sharks (1996–97)	1–4–2	L
8	October 20, 1996	1–5	Boston Bruins (1996–97)	1–5–2	L
9	October 22, 1996	0–3	@ Philadelphia Flyers (1996–97)	1–6–2	L
10	October 24, 1996	1–4	@ Hartford Whalers (1996–97)	1–7–2	L
11	October 27, 1996	1–4	Calgary Flames (1996–97)	1–8–2	L
12	October 30, 1996	3–6	Vancouver Canucks (1996–97)	1–9–2	L

November: 6–5–2 (home: 5–3–2; road: 1–2–0)

Game	Date	Score	Opponent	Record	Recap
13	November 1, 1996	4–3	San Jose Sharks (1996–97)	2–9–2	W
14	November 3, 1996	1–1 OT	Colorado Avalanche (1996–97)	2–9–3	T
15	November 6, 1996	5–6	Montreal Canadiens (1996–97)	2–10–3	L
16	November 8, 1996	7–4	Los Angeles Kings (1996–97)	3–10–3	W
17	November 11, 1996	2–3	Dallas Stars (1996–97)	3–11–3	L
18	November 13, 1996	3–2	Toronto Maple Leafs (1996–97)	4–11–3	W
19	November 15, 1996	3–4	@ Dallas Stars (1996–97)	4–12–3	L
20	November 17, 1996	2–4	@ St. Louis Blues (1996–97)	4–13–3	L
21	November 20, 1996	2–2 OT	New York Islanders (1996–97)	4–13–4	T
22	November 23, 1996	3–0	@ San Jose Sharks (1996–97)	5–13–4	W
23	November 24, 1996	3–1	Detroit Red Wings (1996–97)	6–13–4	W
24	November 27, 1996	2–3	St. Louis Blues (1996–97)	6–14–4	L
25	November 29, 1996	2–0	Chicago Blackhawks (1996–97)	7–14–4	W

December: 6–5–1 (home: 4–2–0; road: 2–3–1)

Game	Date	Score	Opponent	Record	Recap
26	December 1, 1996	4–2	Edmonton Oilers (1996–97)	8–14–4	W
27	December 4, 1996	3–1	Tampa Bay Lightning (1996–97)	9–14–4	W
28	December 6, 1996	1–1 OT	@ Buffalo Sabres (1996–97)	9–14–5	T
29	December 7, 1996	3–5	@ Pittsburgh Penguins (1996–97)	9–15–5	L
30	December 9, 1996	5–2	@ Boston Bruins (1996–97)	10–15–5	W
31	December 11, 1996	3–7	Pittsburgh Penguins (1996–97)	10–16–5	L
32	December 13, 1996	5–4	Washington Capitals (1996–97)	11–16–5	W
33	December 20, 1996	7–0	Calgary Flames (1996–97)	12–16–5	W
34	December 23, 1996	1–2	Phoenix Coyotes (1996–97)	12–17–5	L
35	December 27, 1996	2–3	@ New York Rangers (1996–97)	12–18–5	L
36	December 28, 1996	3–5	@ New Jersey Devils (1996–97)	12–19–5	L
37	December 30, 1996	4–3 OT	@ Ottawa Senators (1996–97)	13–19–5	W

January: 7–5–1 (home: 4–1–0; road: 3–4–1)

Game	Date	Score	Opponent	Record	Recap
38	January 1, 1997	3–0	@ Florida Panthers (1996–97)	14–19–5	W
39	January 3, 1997	2–3	@ Tampa Bay Lightning (1996–97)	14–20–5	L
40	January 6, 1997	1–5	Vancouver Canucks (1996–97)	14–21–5	L
41	January 8, 1997	3–2	Florida Panthers (1996–97)	15–21–5	W
42	January 10, 1997	5–2	Buffalo Sabres (1996–97)	16–21–5	W
43	January 12, 1997	3–2	@ Vancouver Canucks (1996–97)	17–21–5	W
44	January 15, 1997	1–2	@ Calgary Flames (1996–97)	17–22–5	L
45	January 22, 1997	3–1	New Jersey Devils (1996–97)	18–22–5	W
46	January 23, 1997	3–6	@ Phoenix Coyotes (1996–97)	18–23–5	L
47	January 25, 1997	2–2 OT	@ Los Angeles Kings (1996–97)	18–23–6	T
48	January 27, 1997	4–1	@ St. Louis Blues (1996–97)	19–23–6	W
49	January 29, 1997	1–3	@ Dallas Stars (1996–97)	19–24–6	L
50	January 31, 1997	6–3	Hartford Whalers (1996–97)	20–24–6	W

February: 6–6–1 (home: 4–1–1; road: 2–5–0)

Game	Date	Score	Opponent	Record	Recap
51	February 2, 1997	2–5	Colorado Avalanche (1996–97)	20–25–6	L
52	February 4, 1997	3–4	@ New York Islanders (1996–97)	20–26–6	L
53	February 5, 1997	2–4	@ Toronto Maple Leafs (1996–97)	20–27–6	L
54	February 8, 1997	2–1 OT	@ Edmonton Oilers (1996–97)	21–27–6	W
55	February 9, 1997	1–6	@ Calgary Flames (1996–97)	21–28–6	L
56	February 12, 1997	5–2	Toronto Maple Leafs (1996–97)	22–28–6	W
57	February 15, 1997	2–4	@ Vancouver Canucks (1996–97)	22–29–6	L
58	February 17, 1997	5–1	Edmonton Oilers (1996–97)	23–29–6	W
59	February 20, 1997	1–3	@ Los Angeles Kings (1996–97)	23–30–6	L
60	February 22, 1997	4–2	Phoenix Coyotes (1996–97)	24–30–6	W
61	February 23, 1997	5–2	Vancouver Canucks (1996–97)	25–30–6	W
62	February 26, 1997	3–3 OT	Edmonton Oilers (1996–97)	25–30–7	T
63	February 28, 1997	4–1	@ Washington Capitals (1996–97)	26–30–7	W

March: 7–3–4 (home: 4–0–2; road: 3–3–2)

Game	Date	Score	Opponent	Record	Recap
64	March 2, 1997	1–1 OT	@ Detroit Red Wings (1996–97)	26–30–8	T
65	March 5, 1997	4–1	Ottawa Senators (1996–97)	27–30–8	W
66	March 7, 1997	5–2	New York Rangers (1996–97)	28–30–8	W
67	March 9, 1997	2–2 OT	@ Colorado Avalanche (1996–97)	28–30–9	T
68	March 12, 1997	2–1	Detroit Red Wings (1996–97)	29–30–9	W
69	March 14, 1997	4–4 OT	St. Louis Blues (1996–97)	29–30–10	T
70	March 16, 1997	2–2 OT	Calgary Flames (1996–97)	29–30–11	T
71	March 19, 1997	6–2	Los Angeles Kings (1996–97)	30–30–11	W
72	March 21, 1997	3–4	@ Colorado Avalanche (1996–97)	30–31–11	L
73	March 23, 1997	4–1	@ Edmonton Oilers (1996–97)	31–31–11	W
74	March 25, 1997	2–3	@ Calgary Flames (1996–97)	31–32–11	L
75	March 26, 1997	3–5	@ Vancouver Canucks (1996–97)	31–33–11	L
76	March 28, 1997	4–3	@ Chicago Blackhawks (1996–97)	32–33–11	W
77	March 30, 1997	1–0 OT	@ Detroit Red Wings (1996–97)	33–33–11	W

April: 3–0–2 (home: 2–0–1; road: 1–0–1)

Game	Date	Score	Opponent	Record	Recap
78	April 1, 1997	3–3 OT	Chicago Blackhawks (1996–97)	33–33–12	T
79	April 2, 1997	5–5 OT	@ San Jose Sharks (1996–97)	33–33–13	T
80	April 4, 1997	3–2	Dallas Stars (1996–97)	34–33–13	W
81	April 9, 1997	4–1	Los Angeles Kings (1996–97)	35–33–13	W
82	April 11, 1997	4–3	@ San Jose Sharks (1996–97)	36–33–13	W

Legend: W Win (2 points) L Loss (0 points) T Tie (1 point)

=== Playoffs ===
1997 Stanley Cup playoffs
Western Conference Quarterfinals vs. (5) Phoenix Coyotes – Mighty Ducks win 4–3

Game	Date	Score	Opponent	Series	Recap
1	April 16, 1997	4–2	Phoenix Coyotes	Mighty Ducks lead 1–0	W
2	April 18, 1997	4–2	Phoenix Coyotes	Mighty Ducks lead 2–0	W
3	April 20, 1997	1–4	@ Phoenix Coyotes	Mighty Ducks lead 2–1	L
4	April 22, 1997	0–2	@ Phoenix Coyotes	Series tied 2–2	L
5	April 24, 1997	2–5	Phoenix Coyotes	Coyotes lead 3–2	L
6	April 27, 1997	3–2 OT	@ Phoenix Coyotes	Series tied 3–3	W
7	April 29, 1997	3–0	Phoenix Coyotes	Mighty Ducks win 4–3	W

Western Conference Semifinals vs. (3) Detroit Red Wings – Red Wings win 4–0

Game	Date	Score	Opponent	Series	Recap
1	May 2, 1997	1–2 OT	@ Detroit Red Wings	Red Wings lead 1–0	L
2	May 4, 1997	2–3 3OT	@ Detroit Red Wings	Red Wings lead 2–0	L
3	May 6, 1997	2–5	Detroit Red Wings	Red Wings lead 3–0	L
4	May 8, 1997	2–3 2OT	Detroit Red Wings	Red Wings win 4–0	L

Legend: W Win L Loss

== Player statistics ==
=== Scoring ===
- Position abbreviations: C = Center; D = Defense; G = Goaltender; LW = Left wing; RW = Right wing
- † = Joined team via a transaction (e.g., trade, waivers, signing) during the season. Stats reflect time with the Mighty Ducks only.
- ‡ = Left team via a transaction (e.g., trade, waivers, release) during the season. Stats reflect time with the Mighty Ducks only.

No.	Player	Pos	Regular season						Playoffs					
No.	Player	Pos	GP	G	A	Pts	+/-	PIM	GP	G	A	Pts	+/-	PIM
8	Teemu Selanne	RW	78	51	58	109	28	34	11	7	3	10	−3	4
9	Paul Kariya	LW	69	44	55	99	36	6	11	7	6	13	−2	4
20	Steve Rucchin	C	79	19	48	67	26	24	8	1	2	3	−2	10
15	Dmitri Mironov†	D	62	12	34	46	20	77	11	1	10	11	0	10
17	Jari Kurri	RW	82	13	22	35	−13	12	11	1	2	3	2	4
12 (Note: Todd wore number 21 in his first five games.)	Kevin Todd	C	65	9	21	30	−7	44	4	0	0	0	−3	2
14	Joe Sacco	RW	77	12	17	29	1	35	11	2	0	2	−4	2
23	Brian Bellows†	LW	62	15	13	28	−11	22	11	2	4	6	−7	2
29	Darren Van Impe	D	74	4	19	23	3	90	9	0	2	2	−3	16
46	Jean-Francois Jomphe	C	64	7	14	21	−9	53	—	—	—	—	—	—
13	Ted Drury	LW	73	9	9	18	−9	54	10	1	0	1	−2	4
2	Bobby Dollas	D	79	4	14	18	17	55	11	0	0	0	−2	4
16	Warren Rychel	RW	70	10	7	17	6	218	11	0	2	2	−2	19
54	Sean Pronger	C	39	7	7	14	6	20	9	0	2	2	0	4
18	Garry Valk‡	LW	53	7	7	14	−2	53	—	—	—	—	—	—
10	Roman Oksiuta‡	RW	28	6	7	13	−12	22	—	—	—	—	—	—
33	Dave Karpa	D	69	2	11	13	11	210	8	1	1	2	−2	20
36	J. J. Daigneault†	D	13	2	9	11	5	22	11	2	7	9	−6	16
4	Fredrik Olausson‡	D	20	2	9	11	−5	8	—	—	—	—	—	—
22	Ken Baumgartner	LW	67	0	11	11	0	182	11	0	1	1	0	11
28 (Note: Marshall wore number 23 until Bellows was acquired.)	Jason Marshall	D	73	1	9	10	6	140	7	0	1	1	1	4
32	Alex Hicks‡	C	18	2	6	8	1	14	—	—	—	—	—	—
34	Dan Trebil	D	29	3	3	6	5	23	9	0	1	1	−6	6
27	Mike Leclerc	LW	5	1	1	2	2	0	1	0	0	0	0	0
32	Richard Park†	C	11	1	1	2	0	10	11	0	1	1	−2	2
24	Mark Janssens†	C	12	0	2	2	−3	47	11	0	0	0	−3	15
11	Valeri Karpov	RW	9	1	0	1	−2	16	—	—	—	—	—	—
52	Peter Leboutillier	RW	23	1	0	1	0	121	—	—	—	—	—	—
31	Guy Hebert	G	67	0	1	1		4	9	0	0	0		0
5	Ruslan Salei	D	30	0	1	1	−8	37	—	—	—	—	—	—
26	Nikolai Tsulygin	D	22	0	1	1	−5	8	—	—	—	—	—	—
19	Shawn Antoski†	LW	2	0	0	0	1	2	—	—	—	—	—	—
39	Frank Banham	RW	3	0	0	0	−2	0	—	—	—	—	—	—
42	Barry Nieckar	LW	2	0	0	0	0	5	—	—	—	—	—	—
1	Mike O'Neill	G	1	0	0	0		0	—	—	—	—	—	—
25	Adrien Plavsic	D	6	0	0	0	−5	2	—	—	—	—	—	—
51	Craig Reichert	RW	3	0	0	0	−2	0	—	—	—	—	—	—
35	Mikhail Shtalenkov	G	24	0	0	0		4	4	0	0	0		2
40	Jeremy Stevenson	LW	5	0	0	0	−1	14	—	—	—	—	—	—
21	Igor Nikulin	RW	—	—	—	—	—	—	1	0	0	0	0	0

=== Goaltending ===
No.	Player	Regular season											Playoffs									
No.	Player	GP	GS	W	L	T	SA	GA	GAA	SV%	SO	TOI	GP	GS	W	L	SA	GA	GAA	SV%	SO	TOI
31	Guy Hebert	67	66	29	25	12	2,133	172	2.67	.919	4	3,862:36	9	9	4	4	255	18	2.02	.929	1	533:31
35	Mikhail Shtalenkov	24	16	7	8	1	539	52	2.89	.904	2	1,078:47	4	2	0	3	162	10	2.84	.938	0	211:27
1	Mike O'Neill	1	0	0	0	0	10	3	5.76	.700	0	31:16	—	—	—	—	—	—	—	—	—	—

== Awards and records ==
=== Awards ===
Type	Award/honor	Recipient	Ref
League (annual)	Lady Byng Memorial Trophy	Paul Kariya	
League (annual)	NHL First All-Star Team	Paul Kariya (Left wing)	
League (annual)	NHL First All-Star Team	Teemu Selanne (Right wing)	
League (in-season)	NHL All-Star Game selection	Guy Hebert (Note: Hebert was an injury replacement for Chris Osgood of the Detroit Red Wings.)	
League (in-season)	NHL All-Star Game selection	Paul Kariya (Note: Kariya was voted to the starting lineup.)	
League (in-season)	NHL All-Star Game selection	Teemu Selanne (Note: Selanne was an injury replacement for Joe Sakic of the Colorado Avalanche.)	

=== Records ===
- Teemu Selanne – most points in a season (109)
- Paul Kariya – most plus/minus in a season (+36)
- Guy Hebert – most ties in a season (12)
- Guy Hebert – most shots against in a season (2133)

=== Milestones ===
Milestone	Player	Date	Ref
First game	Ruslan Salei	October 7, 1996	
First game	Nikolai Tsulygin	October 22, 1996	
First game	Frank Banham	January 25, 1997	
First game	Peter Leboutillier	January 27, 1997	
First game	Craig Reichert	February 4, 1997	
First game	Dan Trebil	February 5, 1997	
First game	Mike Leclerc	March 28, 1997	
First game	Igor Nikulin	April 27, 1997	

== Transactions ==
July 1, 1996	To Mighty Ducks Kevin Brown	To Ottawa Senators Mike Maneluk
October 1, 1996	To Mighty Ducks Espen Knutsen	To Hartford Whalers Kevin Brown
October 1, 1996	To Mighty Ducks Ted Drury; Marc Moro	To Ottawa Senators Shaun Van Allen; Jason York
November 18, 1996	To Mighty Ducks Brian Bellows	To Tampa Bay Lightning 6th-round pick in 1997
November 19, 1996	To Mighty Ducks Shawn Antoski; Dmitri Mironov	To Pittsburgh Penguins Alex Hicks; Fredrik Olausson
February 21, 1997	To Mighty Ducks J. J. Daigneault	To Pittsburgh Penguins Garry Valk
March 18, 1997	To Mighty Ducks Richard Park	To Pittsburgh Penguins Roman Oksiuta
March 18, 1997	To Mighty Ducks Mark Janssens	To Hartford Whalers Bates Battaglia; 4th-round pick in 1998

== Draft picks ==
Anaheim's picks at the 1996 NHL entry draft held at the Kiel Center in St. Louis, Missouri.

Round	Pick	Player	Position	Nationality	College/junior/club team
1	9	Ruslan Salei	D	Belarus	Las Vegas Thunder (IHL)
2	35	Matt Cullen	C	United States	St. Cloud State University (NCAA)
5	117	Brendan Buckley	D	United States	Boston College (NCAA)
6^{1}	149	Blaine Russell	G	Canada	Prince Albert Raiders (WHL)
7	172	Timo Ahmaoja	D	Finland	JYP (Finland)
8	198	Kevin Kellett	D	Canada	Prince Albert Raiders (WHL)
9	224	Tobias Johansson	LW	Sweden	Malmo IF (Sweden)

Notes

1. The Mighty Ducks acquired this pick as the result of a trade on July 8, 1995, that sent St. Louis' sixth-round pick in 1995 back to St. Louis in exchange for this pick.
- The Mighty Ducks third-round pick went to the Phoenix Coyotes (formerly the Winnipeg Jets) as the result of a trade on February 27, 1996, that sent Teemu Selanne, Marc Chouinard and a fourth-round pick in 1996 (92nd overall) to Anaheim in exchange for Chad Kilger, Oleg Tverdovsky and this pick (62nd overall).
- The Mighty Ducks fourth-round pick went to the Dallas Stars as the result of a trade on June 22, 1996, that sent a third-round pick in 1996 (58th overall) to Washington in exchange for a third-round pick in 1996 (70th overall) and this pick (90th overall).

Washington previously acquired this pick as the result of a trade on February 2, 1995, that sent Todd Krygier to Anaheim in exchange for this pick.

- The Mighty Ducks sixth-round pick went to the Detroit Red Wings as the result of a trade on April 4, 1995, that sent Mike Sillinger and Jason York to Anaheim in exchange for Stu Grimson, Mark Ferner and this pick (144th overall).

== See also ==
- 1996–97 NHL season
