= Igor Nikulin =

Igor Nikulin may refer to:

- Igor Nikulin (hammer thrower) (born 1960), Russian hammer thrower
- Igor Nikulin (ice hockey) (born 1972), Russian ice hockey player
