= 1996–97 Pittsburgh Penguins season =

NHL team season

1996–97 Pittsburgh Penguins
- Division: 2nd Northeast
- Conference: 6th Eastern
- 1996–97 record: 38–36–8
- Home record: 25–11–5
- Road record: 13–25–3
- Goals for: 285
- Goals against: 280

Team information
- General manager: Craig Patrick
- Coach: Eddie Johnston (Oct.–Mar.); Craig Patrick (Mar.–Apr.)
- Captain: Mario Lemieux
- Alternate captains: Ron Francis; Jaromir Jagr
- Arena: Civic Arena
- Average attendance: 16,691
- Minor league affiliates: Cleveland Lumberjacks; Johnstown Chiefs

Team leaders
- Goals: Mario Lemieux (50)
- Assists: Mario Lemieux (72)
- Points: Mario Lemieux (122)
- Penalty minutes: Dave Roche (155)
- Plus/minus: Mario Lemieux (+27)
- Wins: Patrick Lalime (21)
- Goals against average: Patrick Lalime (2.94)

The 1996–97 Pittsburgh Penguins season was the team's 30th in the National Hockey League (NHL). This was the final season for Mario Lemieux before his first retirement.

== Regular season ==
The 1996–97 season featured Mario Lemieux in his final season before his first retirement. Lemieux won his sixth (and final) Art Ross Trophy as the NHL's leading scorer, with 122 points. The Penguins had an up-and-down season en route to a sixth-place finish in the Eastern Conference. A 2–9–0 start was followed by a hot middle-of-the-season stretch, highlighted by the play of rookie phenom goaltender Patrick Lalime. A shoulder injury to Tom Barrasso ended his season after five unmemorable games and led to the promotion of Lalime from the Cleveland Lumberjacks of the International Hockey League (IHL). Lalime debuted in relief of Ken Wregget in a loss to the New York Rangers on November 16. His first win came in relief of Wregget on December 6, and the next day, on December 7, he was given the start against the Mighty Ducks of Anaheim, beating the Mighty Ducks and setting him well on his way to setting the NHL record for consecutive games unbeaten to begin a career for an NHL goaltender, going 14–0–2 (16 games). However, the Penguins cooled down after that, as the team did not win a road game after February 5, which led to a coaching change on March 4. Eddie Johnston was relieved of his duties as head coach after losing eight of his last nine games and was replaced on an interim basis by General Manager Craig Patrick. Patrick went 7–10–3 down the stretch, enough to get the Penguins into the playoffs as the sixth seed at 38–36–8. The Penguins finished the season first in scoring, with 285 goals for.

=== Final standings ===
Northeast Division
No.	CR		GP	W	L	T	GF	GA	Pts
1	2	**Buffalo Sabres**	82	40	30	12	237	208	92
2	6	**Pittsburgh Penguins**	82	38	36	8	285	280	84
3	7	**Ottawa Senators**	82	31	36	15	226	234	77
4	8	**Montreal Canadiens**	82	31	36	15	249	276	77
5	10	Hartford Whalers	82	32	39	11	226	256	75
6	13	Boston Bruins	82	26	47	9	234	300	61

Eastern Conference
R		Div	GP	W	L	T	GF	GA	Pts
**1**	**New Jersey Devils**	**ATL**	**82**	**45**	**23**	**14**	**231**	**182**	**104**
**2**	**Buffalo Sabres**	**NE**	**82**	**40**	**30**	**12**	**237**	**208**	**92**
**3**	**Philadelphia Flyers**	**ATL**	**82**	**45**	**24**	**13**	**274**	**217**	**103**
**4**	**Florida Panthers**	**ATL**	**82**	**35**	**28**	**19**	**221**	**201**	**89**
**5**	**New York Rangers**	**ATL**	**82**	**38**	**34**	**10**	**258**	**231**	**86**
**6**	**Pittsburgh Penguins**	**NE**	**82**	**38**	**36**	**8**	**285**	**280**	**84**
**7**	**Ottawa Senators**	**NE**	**82**	**31**	**36**	**15**	**226**	**234**	**77**
**8**	**Montreal Canadiens**	**NE**	**82**	**31**	**36**	**15**	**249**	**276**	**77**
9	Washington Capitals	ATL	82	33	40	9	214	231	75
10	Hartford Whalers	NE	82	32	39	11	226	256	75
11	Tampa Bay Lightning	ATL	82	32	40	10	217	247	74
12	New York Islanders	ATL	82	29	41	12	240	250	70
13	Boston Bruins	NE	82	26	47	9	234	300	61

Divisions: ATL – Atlantic, NE – Northeast

bold – Qualified for playoffs

== Playoffs ==
In the Eastern Conference Quarterfinals, the Penguins lost, in five games, to the third-seeded Philadelphia Flyers, who went on to win the Eastern Conference championship. The Penguins' only win in the series was in Game 4 at the Civic Arena in Pittsburgh, in which Lemieux scored on a breakaway against Flyers goaltender Garth Snow in the closing minutes for his final goal, at home, before his first retirement.

== Schedule and results ==
=== Regular season ===
1996–97 regular season
October: 2–8–0 (home: 2–1–0; road: 0–7–0), 4 points

#	Date	Visitor	Score	Home	Record	Points	Recap
1	October 5	Tampa Bay Lightning	4–3 OT	Pittsburgh Penguins	0–1–0	0	L
2	October 8	Pittsburgh Penguins	3–7	Hartford Whalers	0–2–0	0	L
3	October 11	Pittsburgh Penguins	2–3	Ottawa Senators	0–3–0	0	L
4	October 12	Ottawa Senators	2–3	Pittsburgh Penguins	1–3–0	2	W
5	October 16	Pittsburgh Penguins	1–8	New York Rangers	1–4–0	2	L
6	October 17	Pittsburgh Penguins	1–4	Buffalo Sabres	1–5–0	2	L
7	October 19	Washington Capitals	1–2	Pittsburgh Penguins	2–5–0	4	W
8	October 22	Pittsburgh Penguins	2–5	Edmonton Oilers	2–6–0	4	L
9	October 24	Pittsburgh Penguins	5–7	Calgary Flames	2–7–0	4	L
10	October 26	Pittsburgh Penguins	1–2	Vancouver Canucks	2–8–0	4	L

November: 6–5–2 (home: 5–1–1; road: 1–4–1), 14 points

#	Date	Visitor	Score	Home	Record	Points	Recap
11	November 1	Pittsburgh Penguins	2–4	Washington Capitals	2–9–0	4	L
12	November 2	Ottawa Senators	3–7	Pittsburgh Penguins	3–9–0	6	W
13	November 6	Edmonton Oilers	2–5	Pittsburgh Penguins	4–9–0	8	W
14	November 8	Pittsburgh Penguins	5–5 OT	Tampa Bay Lightning	4–9–1	9	T
15	November 9	Pittsburgh Penguins	2–4	Florida Panthers	4–10–1	9	L
16	November 12	Buffalo Sabres	0–3	Pittsburgh Penguins	5–10–1	11	W
17	November 14	Pittsburgh Penguins	1–2 OT	Boston Bruins	5–11–1	11	L
18	November 16	New York Rangers	8–3	Pittsburgh Penguins	5–12–1	11	L
19	November 19	St. Louis Blues	2–4	Pittsburgh Penguins	6–12–1	13	W
20	November 21	Pittsburgh Penguins	3–7	Philadelphia Flyers	6–13–1	13	L
21	November 22	Pittsburgh Penguins	7–1	Hartford Whalers	7–13–1	15	W
22	November 27	Montreal Canadiens	2–2 OT	Pittsburgh Penguins	7–13–2	16	T
23	November 30	Boston Bruins	2–6	Pittsburgh Penguins	8–13–2	18	W

December: 11–2–2 (home: 4–1–2; road: 7–1–0), 24 points

#	Date	Visitor	Score	Home	Record	Points	Recap
24	December 3	Hartford Whalers	4–4 OT	Pittsburgh Penguins	8–13–3	19	T
25	December 4	Pittsburgh Penguins	4–2	Ottawa Senators	9–13–3	21	W
26	December 6	Pittsburgh Penguins	5–3	Washington Capitals	10–13–3	23	W
27	December 7	Mighty Ducks of Anaheim	3–5	Pittsburgh Penguins	11–13–3	25	W
28	December 10	Pittsburgh Penguins	5–3	Los Angeles Kings	12–13–3	27	W
29	December 11	Pittsburgh Penguins	7–3	Mighty Ducks of Anaheim	13–13–3	29	W
30	December 13	Pittsburgh Penguins	4–0	San Jose Sharks	14–13–3	31	W
31	December 15	Pittsburgh Penguins	1–2	Chicago Blackhawks	14–14–3	31	L
32	December 17	Boston Bruins	6–4	Pittsburgh Penguins	14–15–3	31	L
33	December 19	Pittsburgh Penguins	4–0	St. Louis Blues	15–15–3	33	W
34	December 21	San Jose Sharks	1–3	Pittsburgh Penguins	16–15–3	35	W
35	December 23	Pittsburgh Penguins	6–5	Toronto Maple Leafs	17–15–3	37	W
36	December 26	Montreal Canadiens	3–3 OT	Pittsburgh Penguins	17–15–4	38	T
37	December 28	Buffalo Sabres	0–2	Pittsburgh Penguins	18–15–4	40	W
38	December 30	Washington Capitals	3–5	Pittsburgh Penguins	19–15–4	42	W

January: 8–3–1 (home: 4–2–0; road: 4–1–1), 17 points

#	Date	Visitor	Score	Home	Record	Points	Recap
39	January 2	Pittsburgh Penguins	6–1	New Jersey Devils	20–15–4	44	W
40	January 4	Tampa Bay Lightning	3–7	Pittsburgh Penguins	21–15–4	46	W
41	January 7	Pittsburgh Penguins	5–3	New York Islanders	22–15–4	48	W
42	January 10	New York Islanders	2–5	Pittsburgh Penguins	23–15–4	50	W
43	January 11	Pittsburgh Penguins	3–3 OT	Ottawa Senators	23–15–5	51	T
44	January 14	Dallas Stars	1–3	Pittsburgh Penguins	24–15–5	53	W
45	January 15	Pittsburgh Penguins	3–0	Hartford Whalers	25–15–5	55	W
46	January 21	Calgary Flames	2–4	Pittsburgh Penguins	26–15–5	57	W
47	January 23	Colorado Avalanche	4–3 OT	Pittsburgh Penguins	26–16–5	57	L
48	January 25	New York Rangers	7–4	Pittsburgh Penguins	26–17–5	57	L
49	January 26	Pittsburgh Penguins	5–2	Montreal Canadiens	27–17–5	59	W
50	January 29	Pittsburgh Penguins	1–3	Buffalo Sabres	27–18–5	59	L

February: 4–7–0 (home: 3–4–0; road: 1–3–0), 8 points

#	Date	Visitor	Score	Home	Record	Points	Recap
51	February 1	Phoenix Coyotes	1–4	Pittsburgh Penguins	28–18–5	61	W
52	February 4	Vancouver Canucks	4–6	Pittsburgh Penguins	29–18–5	63	W
53	February 5	Pittsburgh Penguins	6–3	Montreal Canadiens	30–18–5	65	W
54	February 8	Detroit Red Wings	6–5 OT	Pittsburgh Penguins	30–19–5	65	L
55	February 12	New York Islanders	5–1	Pittsburgh Penguins	30–20–5	65	L
56	February 15	Pittsburgh Penguins	1–5	Philadelphia Flyers	30–21–5	65	L
57	February 16	Philadelphia Flyers	6–2	Pittsburgh Penguins	30–22–5	65	L
58	February 18	Florida Panthers	2–4	Pittsburgh Penguins	31–22–5	67	W
59	February 22	Chicago Blackhawks	5–2	Pittsburgh Penguins	31–23–5	67	L
60	February 23	Pittsburgh Penguins	1–4	New York Islanders	31–24–5	67	L
61	February 27	Pittsburgh Penguins	1–4	Detroit Red Wings	31–25–5	67	L

March: 5–8–2 (home: 5–2–1; road: 0–6–1), 12 points

#	Date	Visitor	Score	Home	Record	Points	Recap
62	March 1	Pittsburgh Penguins	3–6	New Jersey Devils	31–26–5	67	L
63	March 4	New Jersey Devils	3–1	Pittsburgh Penguins	31–27–5	67	L
64	March 5	Pittsburgh Penguins	2–4	Buffalo Sabres	31–28–5	67	L
65	March 8	Philadelphia Flyers	2–3 OT	Pittsburgh Penguins	32–28–5	69	W
66	March 10	Montreal Canadiens	2–2 OT	Pittsburgh Penguins	32–28–6	70	T
67	March 12	Pittsburgh Penguins	5–5 OT	Phoenix Coyotes	32–28–7	71	T
68	March 14	Pittsburgh Penguins	3–6	Colorado Avalanche	32–29–7	71	L
69	March 16	Pittsburgh Penguins	2–6	Dallas Stars	32–30–7	71	L
70	March 18	Buffalo Sabres	3–5	Pittsburgh Penguins	33–30–7	73	W
71	March 20	Toronto Maple Leafs	3–6	Pittsburgh Penguins	34–30–7	75	W
72	March 22	New Jersey Devils	3–2	Pittsburgh Penguins	34–31–7	75	L
73	March 24	Pittsburgh Penguins	0–3	New York Rangers	34–32–7	75	L
74	March 26	Pittsburgh Penguins	5–8	Montreal Canadiens	34–33–7	75	L
75	March 29	Los Angeles Kings	1–4	Pittsburgh Penguins	35–33–7	77	W
76	March 31	Florida Panthers	3–4	Pittsburgh Penguins	36–33–7	79	W

April: 2–3–1 (home: 2–0–1; road: 0–3–0), 5 points

#	Date	Visitor	Score	Home	Record	Points	Recap
77	April 3	Hartford Whalers	5–5 OT	Pittsburgh Penguins	36–33–8	80	T
78	April 5	Ottawa Senators	2–5	Pittsburgh Penguins	37–33–8	82	W
79	April 8	Boston Bruins	1–3	Pittsburgh Penguins	38–33–8	84	W
80	April 10	Pittsburgh Penguins	3–4	Tampa Bay Lightning	38–34–8	84	L
81	April 11	Pittsburgh Penguins	2–4	Florida Panthers	38–35–8	84	L
82	April 13	Pittsburgh Penguins	3–7	Boston Bruins	38–36–8	84	L

Legend: W Win (2 points) L Loss (0 points) T Tie (1 point)

=== Playoffs ===
1997 Stanley Cup playoffs
Eastern Conference Quarterfinals vs. (3) Philadelphia Flyers – Flyers win 4–1

Game	Date	Visitor	Score	Home	Series	Recap
1	April 17	Pittsburgh Penguins	1–5	Philadelphia Flyers	0–1	L
2	April 19	Pittsburgh Penguins	2–3	Philadelphia Flyers	0–2	L
3	April 21	Philadelphia Flyers	5–3	Pittsburgh Penguins	0–3	L
4	April 23	Philadelphia Flyers	1–4	Pittsburgh Penguins	1–3	W
5	April 26	Pittsburgh Penguins	3–6	Philadelphia Flyers	1–4	L

Legend: W Win L Loss

== Player statistics ==
Skaters

Regular season
Player	GP	G	A	Pts	+/−	PIM
Mario Lemieux	76	50	72	122	27	65
Jaromir Jagr	63	47	48	95	22	40
Ron Francis	81	27	63	90	7	20
Petr Nedved	74	33	38	71	–2	66
Kevin Hatcher	80	15	39	54	11	103
Stu Barnes^{†}	62	17	22	39	–20	16
Jason Woolley^{†}	57	6	30	36	3	28
Fredrik Olausson^{†}	51	7	20	27	21	24
Tomas Sandstrom^{‡}	40	9	15	24	4	33
Glen Murray^{‡}	66	11	11	22	–19	24
Joe Mullen	54	7	15	22	0	4
Alex Hicks^{†}	55	5	15	20	–6	76
Darius Kasparaitis^{†}	57	2	16	18	24	84
Joe Dziedzic	59	9	9	18	–4	63
Jean-Jacques Daigneault^{‡}	53	3	14	17	–5	36
Greg Johnson^{†}	32	7	9	16	–13	14
Eddie Olczyk^{†}	12	4	7	11	8	6
Dave Roche	61	5	5	10	–13	155
Ian Moran	36	4	5	9	–11	22
Andreas Johansson^{†}	27	2	7	9	–6	20
Garry Valk^{†}	17	3	4	7	–6	25
Chris Tamer	45	2	4	6	–25	131
Dmitri Mironov^{‡}	15	1	5	6	–4	24
Alek Stojanov	35	1	4	5	3	79
Jeff Christian	11	2	2	4	–3	13
Petr Klima^{†‡}	9	1	3	4	–4	4
Josef Beranek	8	3	1	4	–1	4
Craig Muni	64	0	4	4	–6	36
Tyler Wright	45	2	2	4	–7	70
Francois Leroux	59	0	3	3	–3	81
Dan Quinn	16	0	3	3	–6	10
Roman Oksiuta^{†}	7	0	0	0	–4	4
Shawn Antoski^{‡}	13	0	0	0	0	49
Neil Wilkinson	23	0	0	0	–12	36
Ed Patterson	6	0	0	0	0	8
Richard Park^{‡}	1	0	0	0	–1	0
Domenic Pittis	1	0	0	0	–1	0
Stefan Bergqvist	5	0	0	0	–1	7
Total		285	495	780	—	1,480

Playoffs
Player	GP	G	A	Pts	+/−	PIM
Jaromir Jagr	5	4	4	8	–4	4
Mario Lemieux	5	3	3	6	–4	4
Ian Moran	5	1	2	3	1	4
Jason Woolley	5	0	3	3	–1	0
Petr Nedved	5	1	2	3	–2	12
Ron Francis	5	1	2	3	–7	2
Kevin Hatcher	5	1	1	2	–5	4
Alex Hicks	5	0	1	1	–1	2
Eddie Olczyk	5	1	0	1	–2	12
Stu Barnes	5	0	1	1	0	0
Greg Johnson	5	1	0	1	–1	2
Joe Dziedzic	5	0	1	1	–1	4
Fredrik Olausson	4	0	1	1	–1	0
Neil Wilkinson	5	0	0	0	–2	4
Craig Muni	3	0	0	0	0	0
Joe Mullen	1	0	0	0	0	0
Chris Tamer	4	0	0	0	–1	4
Darius Kasparaitis	5	0	0	0	–4	6
Josef Beranek	5	0	0	0	–4	2
Francois Leroux	3	0	0	0	0	0
Total		13	21	34	—	66

Goaltenders

Regular Season
Player	GP	TOI	W	L	T	GA	GAA	SA	SV%	SO	G	A	PIM
Patrick Lalime	39	2057:35	21	12	2	101	2.95	1166	0.913	3	0	0	0
Ken Wregget	46	2514:23	17	17	6	136	3.25	1383	0.902	2	0	1	6
Tom Barrasso	5	269:37	0	5	0	26	5.79	186	0.860	0	0	0	0
Philippe De Rouville	2	111:08	0	2	0	6	3.24	66	0.909	0	0	0	0
Total		4952:43	38	36	8	269	3.26	2801	0.904	5	0	1	6

Playoffs
Player	GP	TOI	W	L	T	GA	GAA	SA	SV%	SO	G	A	PIM
Ken Wregget	5	297:28	1	4	0	18	3.63	211	0.915	0	0	0	2
Total		297:28	1	4	0	18	3.63	211	0.915	0	0	0	2

^{†}Denotes player spent time with another team before joining the Penguins. Stats reflect time with the Penguins only.
^{‡}Denotes player was traded mid-season. Stats reflect time with the Penguins only.

== Awards and records ==
- Mario Lemieux became the first person to score 600 goals for the Penguins. He did so in a 6–4 win over Vancouver on February 4, 1997.
- Mario Lemieux became the first person to score 1400 points for the Penguins. He did so with his first of 4 points in a 6–2 win over Boston on November 30, 1996.

=== Awards ===
Type	Award/honor	Recipient	Ref
League (annual)	Art Ross Trophy	Mario Lemieux	
League (annual)	NHL All-Rookie Team	Patrick Lalime (Goaltender)	
League (annual)	NHL First All-Star Team	Mario Lemieux (Center)	
League (annual)	NHL Second All-Star Team	Jaromir Jagr (Right wing)	
League (in-season)	NHL All-Star Game selection	Kevin Hatcher	
League (in-season)	NHL All-Star Game selection	Jaromir Jagr (Note: Jagr was voted to the starting lineup but did not play and was replaced by Adam Oates of the Boston Bruins.)	
League (in-season)	NHL All-Star Game selection	Mario Lemieux	
League (in-season)	NHL Rookie of the Month	Patrick Lalime (December)	
League (in-season)	NHL Rookie of the Month	Patrick Lalime (January)	
Team	A. T. Caggiano Memorial Booster Club Award	Mario Lemieux	
Team	Aldege "Baz" Bastien Memorial Good Guy Award	Ken Wregget	
Team	Bob Johnson Memorial Badger Bob Award	Joe Mullen	
Team	Leading Scorer Award	Mario Lemieux	
Team	Michel Briere Memorial Rookie of the Year Trophy	Patrick Lalime	
Team	Most Valuable Player Award	Mario Lemieux	
Team	Players' Player Award	Joe Mullen	
Team	The Edward J. DeBartolo Community Service Award	Joe Dziedzic	
Team	The Edward J. DeBartolo Community Service Award	Chris Tamer	

=== Milestones ===
Milestone	Player	Date	Ref
First game	Domenic Pittis	October 26, 1996	
First game	Patrick Lalime	November 16, 1996	
400th goal	Ron Francis	March 29, 1997	
500th game played	Ken Wregget	March 29, 1997	

== Transactions ==
The Penguins have been involved in the following transactions during the 1996–97 season:

=== Trades ===
October 25, 1996	To Los Angeles Kings 1997 conditional pick (not exercised)	To Pittsburgh Penguins Petr Klima
November 17, 1996	To New York Islanders Bryan Smolinski	To Pittsburgh Penguins Andreas Johansson; Darius Kasparaitis
November 19, 1996	To Florida Panthers Chris Wells	To Pittsburgh Penguins Stu Barnes; Jason Woolley
November 19, 1996	To Anaheim Ducks Shawn Antoski; Dmitri Mironov	To Pittsburgh Penguins Alex Hicks; Fredrik Olausson
January 27, 1997	To Detroit Red Wings Tomas Sandstrom	To Pittsburgh Penguins Greg Johnson
February 21, 1997	To Anaheim Ducks Jean-Jacques Daigneault	To Pittsburgh Penguins Garry Valk
March 18, 1997	To Anaheim Ducks Richard Park	To Pittsburgh Penguins Roman Oksiuta
March 18, 1997	To Los Angeles Kings Glen Murray	To Pittsburgh Penguins Ed Olczyk
March 18, 1997	To Vancouver Canucks future considerations (1998 5th round pick)	To Pittsburgh Penguins Josef Beranek

=== Free agents ===
Player	Acquired from	Lost to	Date
Kevin Todd	Los Angeles Kings		July 10, 1996
Kevin Miller		Chicago Blackhawks	July 18, 1996
Dave McLlwain		New York Islanders	July 29, 1996
Dan Quinn	Philadelphia Flyers		July 31, 1996
Shawn Antoski	Philadelphia Flyers		July 31, 1996
Joe Mullen	Boston Bruins		September 5, 1996
Greg Hawgood		San Jose Sharks	September 7, 1996
Craig Muni	Winnipeg Jets		October 2, 1996
Petr Klima		Edmonton Oilers	February 26, 1997

=== Waivers ===
Player	Acquired from	Lost to	Date
Chris Joseph		Vancouver Canucks	September 30, 1996
Corey Foster		New York Islanders	September 30, 1996
Kevin Todd		Mighty Ducks of Anaheim	October 4, 1996

=== Other ===
Name	Details	Date
Craig Patrick	5-year extension (VP & GM)	June 27, 1996
Eddie Johnston	Extension (Head Coach)	June 27, 1996
Craig Patrick	Hired as Head Coach (in addition to GM)	March 3, 1997
Eddie Johnston	Reassigned to Assistant GM	March 3, 1997
Craig Patrick	Replaced as Head Coach (remained as GM)	April 26, 1997
Mario Lemieux	Retired	April 26, 1997
Kevin Constantine	Hired as Head Coach	June 12, 1997

== Draft picks ==
Pittsburgh Penguins' picks at the 1996 NHL entry draft.

Round	#	Player	Pos	Nationality	College/Junior/Club team (League)
1	23	Craig Hillier	Goaltender	Canada	Ottawa 67's (OHL)
2	28^{[a]}	Pavel Skrbek	Defense	Czech Republic	HC Kladno (Czech)
3	72^{[b]}	Boyd Kane	Left wing	Canada	Regina Pats (WHL)
3	77	Borys Protsenko	Right wing	Ukraine	Calgary Hitmen (WHL)
4	105	Michal Rozsival	Defense	Czech Republic	Dukla Jihlava (Czech)
6	150^{[c]}	Peter Bergman	Center	Canada	Kamloops Blazers (WHL)
7	186	Eric Meloche	Right wing	Canada	Cornwall Colts (COJHL)
9	238	Timo Seikkula	Center	Finland	Junkkarit (Finland)

Draft notes

- ^{a} The New Jersey Devils' second-round pick (from San Jose Sharks) went to the Pittsburgh Penguins as a result of a June 22, 1996, trade that sent two second-round picks to the Devils in exchange for this pick.
- The Pittsburgh Penguins' second-round pick (from Toronto Maple Leafs) went to the New Jersey Devils as the result of a June 22, 1996, trade that sent a second-round pick to the Penguins in exchange for a second-round pick and this pick.
- The Pittsburgh Penguins' second-round pick went to the New Jersey Devils as the result of a June 22, 1996, trade that sent a second-round pick to the Penguins in exchange for a second-round pick and this pick.
- ^{b} The Boston Bruins' third-round pick went to the Pittsburgh Penguins as a result of an August 1, 1995, trade that sent Kevin Stevens and Shawn McEachern to the Bruins in exchange for Glen Murray, Bryan Smolinski and this pick.
- The Pittsburgh Penguins' fifth-round pick went to the San Jose Sharks as the result of a March 20, 1996, trade that sent Kevin Miller to the Penguins in exchange for this pick.
- ^{c} Compensatory pick received from NHL as compensation for free agent Joe Mullen.
- The Pittsburgh Penguins' sixth-round pick went to the St. Louis Blues as the result of a March 20, 1996, trade that sent J. J. Daigneault to the Penguins in exchange for this pick.
- The Pittsburgh Penguins' seventh-round pick (from NHL as compensation for free agent Kjell Samuelsson) went to the Edmonton Oilers as the result of a June 22, 1996, trade that sent Tyler Wright to the Penguins in exchange for this pick.
- The Pittsburgh Penguins' eighth-round pick went to the Ottawa Senators as the result of a March 1, 1996, trade that sent Dave McLlwain to the Penguins in exchange for this pick.

== Farm teams ==
The Johnstown Chiefs of the East Coast Hockey League finished last in the North Division with a 24–39–7 record.

The IHL's Cleveland Lumberjacks finished second in the Central Division with a record of 40–32–10. They defeated the Indianapolis Ice in the first round 3–1, then defeated the Orlando Solar Bears in the second round 4–1 before losing to the eventual Turner Cup champion Detroit Vipers, 4–1.

== See also ==
- 1996–97 NHL season
