= 1996–97 Phoenix Coyotes season =

NHL hockey team season

1996–97 Phoenix Coyotes
- Division: 3rd Central
- Conference: 5th Western
- 1996–97 record: 38–37–7
- Home record: 15–19–7
- Road record: 23–18–0
- Goals for: 240
- Goals against: 243

Team information
- General manager: John Paddock (Oct.–Dec.); Bobby Smith (Dec.–Apr.)
- Coach: Don Hay
- Captain: Keith Tkachuk
- Arena: America West Arena
- Average attendance: 15,585
- Minor league affiliates: Springfield Falcons; Mississippi Sea Wolves

Team leaders
- Goals: Keith Tkachuk (52)
- Assists: Oleg Tverdovsky (45)
- Points: Keith Tkachuk (86)
- Penalty minutes: Keith Tkachuk (228)
- Plus/minus: Jayson More (+10)
- Wins: Nikolai Khabibulin (30)
- Goals against average: Nikolai Khabibulin (2.83)

The 1996–97 Phoenix Coyotes season was the team's first of 28 seasons in Arizona in the National Hockey League (NHL) since relocating from Winnipeg the season prior. Originally reckoned as the 25th season of the original Jets/Coyotes franchise, it was later reclassified as the inaugural season of the Coyotes, with its pre-1996 records transferred to the modern-day Winnipeg Jets in 2026.

== Off-season ==
The Winnipeg Jets team was sold to Phoenix businessmen Steven Gluckstern and Richard Burke, and in 1996, the club moved to Arizona and became the Phoenix Coyotes.

In the summer that the move took place, the franchise saw the exit of Jets stars like Teemu Selänne and Alexei Zhamnov, while the team added established superstar Jeremy Roenick from the Chicago Blackhawks.

== Regular season ==
Phoenix's first logo (1996–2003).

Roenick teamed up with power wingers Keith Tkachuk and Rick Tocchet to form a dynamic 1–2–3 offensive punch that led the Coyotes through their first years in Arizona. Also impressive were young players like Shane Doan (who became the last remaining active original Jet in the NHL), Oleg Tverdovsky and goaltender Nikolai Khabibulin, whom the fans nicknamed the "Bulin Wall."

Forward Tkachuk was renamed captain, replacing Kris King.

=== Final standings ===
Central Division
No.	CR		GP	W	L	T	GF	GA	Pts
1	2	**Dallas Stars**	82	48	26	8	252	198	104
2	3	**Detroit Red Wings**	82	38	26	18	253	197	94
3	5	**Phoenix Coyotes**	82	38	37	7	240	243	83
4	6	**St. Louis Blues**	82	36	35	11	236	239	83
5	8	**Chicago Blackhawks**	82	34	35	13	223	210	81
6	11	Toronto Maple Leafs	82	30	44	8	230	273	68

Note: CR = Conference rank; GP = Games played; W = Wins; L = Losses; T = Ties; GF = Goals for; GA = Goals against; Pts = Points
Bolded teams qualified for the playoffs.

Western Conference
R		Div	GP	W	L	T	GF	GA	Pts
**1**	**p – Colorado Avalanche**	**PAC**	**82**	**49**	**24**	**9**	**277**	**205**	**107**
**2**	**Dallas Stars**	**CEN**	**82**	**48**	**26**	**8**	**252**	**198**	**104**
**3**	**Detroit Red Wings**	**CEN**	**82**	**38**	**26**	**18**	**253**	**197**	**94**
**4**	**Mighty Ducks of Anaheim**	**PAC**	**82**	**36**	**33**	**13**	**245**	**233**	**85**
**5**	**Phoenix Coyotes**	**CEN**	**82**	**38**	**37**	**7**	**240**	**243**	**83**
**6**	**St. Louis Blues**	**CEN**	**82**	**36**	**35**	**11**	**236**	**239**	**83**
**7**	**Edmonton Oilers**	**PAC**	**82**	**36**	**37**	**9**	**252**	**247**	**81**
**8**	**Chicago Blackhawks**	**CEN**	**82**	**34**	**35**	**13**	**223**	**210**	**81**
9	Vancouver Canucks	PAC	82	35	40	7	257	273	77
10	Calgary Flames	PAC	82	32	41	9	214	239	73
11	Toronto Maple Leafs	CEN	82	30	44	8	230	273	68
12	Los Angeles Kings	PAC	82	28	43	11	214	268	67
13	San Jose Sharks	PAC	82	27	47	8	211	278	62

Divisions: CEN – Central, PAC – Pacific

bold – Qualified for playoffs; p – Won Presidents' Trophy

== Playoffs ==
In their first year, the Coyotes managed to make the 1997 playoffs. However, they lost to the Mighty Ducks of Anaheim in seven games in the conference quarterfinals.

== Schedule and results ==
=== Regular season ===
1996–97 regular season
October: 4–6–1 (home: 2–3–1; road: 2–3–0)

Game	Date	Score	Opponent	Record	Recap
1	October 5, 1996	0–1	@ Hartford Whalers (1996–97)	0–1–0	L
2	October 7, 1996	5–2	@ Boston Bruins (1996–97)	1–1–0	W
3	October 10, 1996	4–1	San Jose Sharks (1996–97)	2–1–0	W
4	October 12, 1996	4–2	Mighty Ducks of Anaheim (1996–97)	3–1–0	W
5	October 14, 1996	3–6	Edmonton Oilers (1996–97)	3–2–0	L
6	October 18, 1996	1–3	Philadelphia Flyers (1996–97)	3–3–0	L
7	October 20, 1996	1–1 OT	Florida Panthers (1996–97)	3–3–1	T
8	October 22, 1996	1–2	St. Louis Blues (1996–97)	3–4–1	L
9	October 26, 1996	2–5	@ Toronto Maple Leafs (1996–97)	3–5–1	L
10	October 28, 1996	5–4 OT	@ Montreal Canadiens (1996–97)	4–5–1	W
11	October 30, 1996	1–4	@ Edmonton Oilers (1996–97)	4–6–1	L

November: 4–6–3 (home: 3–4–3; road: 1–2–0)

Game	Date	Score	Opponent	Record	Recap
12	November 1, 1996	3–2 OT	@ Calgary Flames (1996–97)	5–6–1	W
13	November 3, 1996	4–4 OT	Montreal Canadiens (1996–97)	5–6–2	T
14	November 6, 1996	2–3	Dallas Stars (1996–97)	5–7–2	L
15	November 8, 1996	1–4	Colorado Avalanche (1996–97)	5–8–2	L
16	November 14, 1996	1–2	Hartford Whalers (1996–97)	5–9–2	L
17	November 16, 1996	3–2	Toronto Maple Leafs (1996–97)	6–9–2	W
18	November 18, 1996	2–2 OT	Detroit Red Wings (1996–97)	6–9–3	T
19	November 20, 1996	0–6	@ Colorado Avalanche (1996–97)	6–10–3	L
20	November 21, 1996	3–4 OT	@ St. Louis Blues (1996–97)	6–11–3	L
21	November 23, 1996	3–3 OT	New York Islanders (1996–97)	6–11–4	T
22	November 26, 1996	1–3	New York Rangers (1996–97)	6–12–4	L
23	November 28, 1996	4–3 OT	New Jersey Devils (1996–97)	7–12–4	W
24	November 30, 1996	3–1	Calgary Flames (1996–97)	8–12–4	W

December: 9–5–0 (home: 3–2–0; road: 6–3–0)

Game	Date	Score	Opponent	Record	Recap
25	December 3, 1996	1–4	Los Angeles Kings (1996–97)	8–13–4	L
26	December 5, 1996	3–0	@ St. Louis Blues (1996–97)	9–13–4	W
27	December 7, 1996	4–3 OT	@ New Jersey Devils (1996–97)	10–13–4	W
28	December 9, 1996	2–5	@ New York Rangers (1996–97)	10–14–4	L
29	December 10, 1996	2–8	@ New York Islanders (1996–97)	10–15–4	L
30	December 13, 1996	4–2	@ Ottawa Senators (1996–97)	11–15–4	W
31	December 14, 1996	5–3	@ Toronto Maple Leafs (1996–97)	12–15–4	W
32	December 17, 1996	4–3	Washington Capitals (1996–97)	13–15–4	W
33	December 20, 1996	5–2	Toronto Maple Leafs (1996–97)	14–15–4	W
34	December 22, 1996	2–7	Calgary Flames (1996–97)	14–16–4	L
35	December 23, 1996	2–1	@ Mighty Ducks of Anaheim (1996–97)	15–16–4	W
36	December 26, 1996	2–5	@ Los Angeles Kings (1996–97)	15–17–4	L
37	December 27, 1996	7–4	Vancouver Canucks (1996–97)	16–17–4	W
38	December 30, 1996	5–3	@ Detroit Red Wings (1996–97)	17–17–4	W

January: 5–7–0 (home: 2–3–0; road: 3–4–0)

Game	Date	Score	Opponent	Record	Recap
39	January 2, 1997	4–2	@ Chicago Blackhawks (1996–97)	18–17–4	W
40	January 3, 1997	0–3	@ Washington Capitals (1996–97)	18–18–4	L
41	January 5, 1997	1–5	@ Buffalo Sabres (1996–97)	18–19–4	L
42	January 9, 1997	4–5 OT	Detroit Red Wings (1996–97)	18–20–4	L
43	January 10, 1997	4–3	@ Dallas Stars (1996–97)	19–20–4	W
44	January 12, 1997	2–3 OT	Buffalo Sabres (1996–97)	19–21–4	L
45	January 13, 1997	4–5	@ San Jose Sharks (1996–97)	19–22–4	L
46	January 15, 1997	1–4	St. Louis Blues (1996–97)	19–23–4	L
47	January 23, 1997	6–3	Mighty Ducks of Anaheim (1996–97)	20–23–4	W
48	January 25, 1997	4–0	Vancouver Canucks (1996–97)	21–23–4	W
49	January 28, 1997	1–4	@ Philadelphia Flyers (1996–97)	21–24–4	L
50	January 29, 1997	3–0	@ Detroit Red Wings (1996–97)	22–24–4	W

February: 6–7–0 (home: 3–4–0; road: 3–3–0)

Game	Date	Score	Opponent	Record	Recap
51	February 1, 1997	1–4	@ Pittsburgh Penguins (1996–97)	22–25–4	L
52	February 4, 1997	0–2	Tampa Bay Lightning (1996–97)	22–26–4	L
53	February 6, 1997	3–2	Chicago Blackhawks (1996–97)	23–26–4	W
54	February 8, 1997	4–5 OT	Dallas Stars (1996–97)	23–27–4	L
55	February 10, 1997	4–2	@ St. Louis Blues (1996–97)	24–27–4	W
56	February 12, 1997	5–0	@ Dallas Stars (1996–97)	25–27–4	W
57	February 13, 1997	2–3	Colorado Avalanche (1996–97)	25–28–4	L
58	February 15, 1997	5–4 OT	Boston Bruins (1996–97)	26–28–4	W
59	February 18, 1997	6–1	Los Angeles Kings (1996–97)	27–28–4	W
60	February 22, 1997	2–4	@ Mighty Ducks of Anaheim (1996–97)	27–29–4	L
61	February 24, 1997	3–5	Detroit Red Wings (1996–97)	27–30–4	L
62	February 26, 1997	5–2	@ Calgary Flames (1996–97)	28–30–4	W
63	February 27, 1997	2–6	@ Vancouver Canucks (1996–97)	28–31–4	L

March: 7–4–2 (home: 1–3–2; road: 6–1–0)

Game	Date	Score	Opponent	Record	Recap
64	March 2, 1997	0–4	Chicago Blackhawks (1996–97)	28–32–4	L
65	March 5, 1997	3–0	@ Florida Panthers (1996–97)	29–32–4	W
66	March 6, 1997	5–0	@ Tampa Bay Lightning (1996–97)	30–32–4	W
67	March 8, 1997	2–0	@ Chicago Blackhawks (1996–97)	31–32–4	W
68	March 10, 1997	1–4	Ottawa Senators (1996–97)	31–33–4	L
69	March 12, 1997	5–5 OT	Pittsburgh Penguins (1996–97)	31–33–5	T
70	March 14, 1997	4–1	@ San Jose Sharks (1996–97)	32–33–5	W
71	March 17, 1997	3–2	St. Louis Blues (1996–97)	33–33–5	W
72	March 19, 1997	2–7	@ Dallas Stars (1996–97)	33–34–5	L
73	March 20, 1997	4–2	@ Chicago Blackhawks (1996–97)	34–34–5	W
74	March 22, 1997	3–0	@ Toronto Maple Leafs (1996–97)	35–34–5	W
75	March 27, 1997	1–1 OT	Toronto Maple Leafs (1996–97)	35–34–6	T
76	March 29, 1997	1–3	Edmonton Oilers (1996–97)	35–35–6	L

April: 3–2–1 (home: 1–0–1; road: 2–2–0)

Game	Date	Score	Opponent	Record	Recap
77	April 1, 1997	7–1	San Jose Sharks (1996–97)	36–35–6	W
78	April 3, 1997	5–4	@ Los Angeles Kings (1996–97)	37–35–6	W
79	April 6, 1997	1–2	@ Colorado Avalanche (1996–97)	37–36–6	L
80	April 7, 1997	2–2 OT	Dallas Stars (1996–97)	37–36–7	T
81	April 9, 1997	4–6	@ Vancouver Canucks (1996–97)	37–37–7	L
82	April 11, 1997	6–2	@ Edmonton Oilers (1996–97)	38–37–7	W

Legend: W Win (2 points) L Loss (0 points) T Tie (1 point)

=== Playoffs ===
1997 Stanley Cup playoffs
Western Conference quarterfinals vs. (4) Mighty Ducks of Anaheim – Mighty Ducks win 4–3

Game	Date	Score	Opponent	Series	Recap
1	April 16, 1997	2–4	@ Mighty Ducks of Anaheim	Mighty Ducks lead 1–0	L
2	April 18, 1997	2–4	@ Mighty Ducks of Anaheim	Mighty Ducks lead 2–0	L
3	April 20, 1997	4–1	Mighty Ducks of Anaheim	Mighty Ducks lead 2–1	W
4	April 22, 1997	2–0	Mighty Ducks of Anaheim	Series tied 2–2	W
5	April 24, 1997	5–2	@ Mighty Ducks of Anaheim	Coyotes lead 3–2	W
6	April 27, 1997	2–3 OT	Mighty Ducks of Anaheim	Series tied 3–3	L
7	April 29, 1997	0–3	@ Mighty Ducks of Anaheim	Mighty Ducks win 4–3	L

Legend: W Win L Loss

== Player statistics ==
=== Scoring ===
- Position abbreviations: C = Center; D = Defense; G = Goaltender; LW = Left wing; RW = Right wing
- † = Joined team via a transaction (e.g., trade, waivers, signing) during the season. Stats reflect time with the Coyotes only.
- ‡ = Left team via a transaction (e.g., trade, waivers, release) during the season. Stats reflect time with the Coyotes only.

No.	Player	Pos	Regular season						Playoffs					
No.	Player	Pos	GP	G	A	Pts	+/-	PIM	GP	G	A	Pts	+/-	PIM
7	Keith Tkachuk	LW	81	52	34	86	−1	228	7	6	0	6	2	7
97	Jeremy Roenick	C	72	29	40	69	−7	115	6	2	4	6	6	4
22	Mike Gartner	RW	82	32	31	63	−11	38	7	1	2	3	−1	4
20	Oleg Tverdovsky	D	82	10	45	55	−5	30	7	0	1	1	0	0
15	Craig Janney	C	77	15	38	53	−1	26	7	0	3	3	1	4
77	Cliff Ronning	C	69	19	32	51	−9	26	7	0	7	7	2	12
11	Dallas Drake	RW	63	17	19	36	−11	52	7	0	1	1	−2	2
27	Teppo Numminen	D	82	2	25	27	−3	28	7	3	3	6	3	0
34	Darrin Shannon	LW	82	11	13	24	4	41	7	3	1	4	2	4
21	Bob Corkum	C	80	9	11	20	−7	40	7	2	2	4	−1	4
4	Dave Manson‡	D	66	3	17	20	−25	164	—	—	—	—	—	—
14	Mike Stapleton	C	55	4	11	15	−4	36	7	0	0	0	−1	14
17	Kris King	LW	81	3	11	14	−7	185	7	0	0	0	−1	17
5	Deron Quint	D	27	3	11	14	−4	4	7	0	2	2	2	0
44	Norm Maciver	D	32	4	9	13	−11	24	—	—	—	—	—	—
19	Shane Doan	RW	63	4	8	12	−3	49	4	0	0	0	−1	2
26	Jeff Finley	D	65	3	7	10	−8	40	1	0	0	0	−1	2
8	Jim Johnson	D	55	3	7	10	5	74	6	0	0	0	0	4
23	Igor Korolev	C	41	3	7	10	−5	28	1	0	0	0	0	0
33	Jim McKenzie	LW	65	5	3	8	−5	200	7	0	0	0	0	2
18	Chad Kilger	LW	24	4	3	7	−5	13	—	—	—	—	—	—
6	Jay More†	D	23	1	6	7	10	37	7	0	0	0	1	7
10	Brad McCrimmon	D	37	1	5	6	2	18	—	—	—	—	—	—
32	Mike Eastwood‡	C	33	1	3	4	−3	4	—	—	—	—	—	—
4	Gerald Diduck†	D	11	1	2	3	2	23	7	0	0	0	2	10
35	Nikolai Khabibulin	G	72	0	3	3		16	7	0	0	0		6
32	Jocelyn Lemieux†	RW	2	1	0	1	0	0	2	0	0	0	0	4
43	Darcy Wakaluk	G	16	0	1	1		4	—	—	—	—	—	—
36 (Note: Baron wore number 2 in his first three games.)	Murray Baron†	D	8	0	0	0	0	4	1	0	0	0	0	0
24	Kevin Dahl	D	2	0	0	0	0	0	—	—	—	—	—	—
1	Parris Duffus	G	1	0	0	0		0	—	—	—	—	—	—
6	Dallas Eakins‡	D	4	0	0	0	−3	10	—	—	—	—	—	—
47	Tavis Hansen	RW	1	0	0	0	0	0	—	—	—	—	—	—
28	Mike Hudson†	C	7	0	0	0	−4	2	—	—	—	—	—	—
39 (Note: Jablonski wore number 46 in his first game.)	Pat Jablonski†	G	2	0	0	0		0	—	—	—	—	—	—
38	Jason Simon	LW	1	0	0	0	−1	0	—	—	—	—	—	—
3	Brent Thompson	D	1	0	0	0	−1	7	—	—	—	—	—	—
36	Juha Ylönen	C	2	0	0	0	0	0	—	—	—	—	—	—

=== Goaltending ===
- † = Joined team via a transaction (e.g., trade, waivers, signing) during the season. Stats reflect time with the Coyotes only.

No.	Player	Regular season										Playoffs								
No.	Player	GP	W	L	T	SA	GA	GAA	SV%	SO	TOI	GP	W	L	SA	GA	GAA	SV%	SO	TOI
35	Nikolai Khabibulin	72	30	33	6	2094	193	2.83	.908	7	4091	7	3	4	222	15	2.11	.932	1	426
43	Darcy Wakaluk	16	8	3	1	386	39	2.99	.899	1	782	—	—	—	—	—	—	—	—	—
1	Parris Duffus	1	0	0	0	8	1	2.08	.875	0	29	—	—	—	—	—	—	—	—	—
39	Pat Jablonski†	2	0	1	0	24	2	2.04	.917	0	59	—	—	—	—	—	—	—	—	—

== Awards and records ==
=== Awards ===
Type	Award/honor	Recipient	Ref
League (in-season)	NHL All-Star Game selection	Keith Tkachuk (Note: Tkachuk was an injury replacement for Mike Modano of the Dallas Stars.)	
League (in-season)	NHL All-Star Game selection	Oleg Tverdovsky	
Team	Hardest Working Player Award	Dallas Drake	
Team	Leading Scorer Award	Keith Tkachuk	
Team	Man of the Year Award	Kris King	
Team	Team MVP Award	Keith Tkachuk	
Team	Three-Star Award	Keith Tkachuk	

=== Milestones ===
Milestone	Player	Date	Ref
First game	Juha Ylönen	February 12, 1997	
First game	Parris Duffus	February 27, 1997	

== Transactions ==
=== Trades ===
June 22, 1996	To Toronto Maple Leafs 4th round pick in 1996	To Phoenix Coyotes Mike Gartner
July 1, 1996	To Calgary Flames 3rd round pick in 1997	To Phoenix Coyotes Compensation for head coach Don Hay
August 16, 1996	To Chicago Blackhawks Alexei Zhamnov; Craig Mills; 1st round pick in 1997	To Phoenix Coyotes Jeremy Roenick
February 6, 1997	To New York Rangers Mike Eastwood; Dallas Eakins	To Phoenix Coyotes Jay More
March 18, 1997	To Montreal Canadiens Dave Manson; Steve Cheredaryk	To Phoenix Coyotes Murray Baron; Pat Jablonski; Chris Murray

=== Waivers ===
September 30, 1996	From Philadelphia Flyers Bob Corkum

=== Free agents ===
Joining the Coyotes:

Player	Former team
Cliff Ronning	Vancouver Canucks
Brad McCrimmon	Hartford Whalers
Jim Johnson	Dallas Stars
Darcy Wakaluk	Dallas Stars
Reggie Savage	Colorado Avalanche
Kevin Dahl	Calgary Flames
Scott Levins	Ottawa Senators
Mike Hudson	St. Louis Blues
Jocelyn Lemieux	Calgary Flames

Leaving the Coyotes:

Player	New team
Dominic Roussel	Philadelphia Flyers
Ed Olczyk	Los Angeles Kings
Craig Martin	Florida Panthers
Iain Fraser	San Jose Sharks
Denis Chasse	Ottawa Senators

== Draft picks ==
Phoenix's draft picks at the 1996 NHL entry draft held at the Kiel Center in St. Louis.

Round	Pick	Player	Nationality	College/junior/club team
1	11	Dan Focht (D)	Canada	Tri-City Americans (WHL)
1	24	Daniel Brière (C)	Canada	Drummondville Voltigeurs (QMJHL)
3	62	Per-Anton Lundström (D)	Sweden	Modo Hockey (Elitserien)
5	119	Richard Lintner (D)	Slovakia	Dukla Trenčín Jr. (Slovakia)
6	139	Robert Esche (G)	United States	Detroit Whalers (OHL)
7	174	Trevor Letowski (RW)	Canada	Sarnia Sting (OHL)
8	200	Nick Lent (RW)	United States	Omaha Lancers (USHL)
9	226	Marc-Étienne Hubert (C)	Canada	Laval Titan Collège Français (QMJHL)
