= Mike O'Neill (ice hockey) =

Canadian ice hockey player

- Born: November 3, 1967 (age 57); LaSalle, Quebec, Canada
- Height: 5 ft 7 in (170 cm)
- Weight: 155 lb (70 kg; 11 st 1 lb)
- Position: Goaltender
- Caught: Left
- Played for: Tappara Tampere; Moncton Hawks; Fort Wayne Komets; Winnipeg Jets; Phoenix Roadrunners; Baltimore Bandits; Anaheim Mighty Ducks; Long Beach Ice Dogs; Portland Pirates; EC VSV; Michigan K-Wings; Sheffield Steelers
- NHL draft: 1988 NHL Supplemental Draft; Winnipeg Jets
- Playing career: 1989–2001

Michael Anthony O'Neill (born November 3, 1967) is a Canadian former professional ice hockey goaltender who played in the National Hockey League (NHL).

== Playing career ==
O'Neill was born in LaSalle, Quebec. As a youth, he played in the 1979 and 1980 Quebec International Pee-Wee Hockey Tournaments with a minor ice hockey team from LaSalle.

O'Neill played four years at Yale University before spending the 1989–90 season with Tappara Tampere of the SM-liiga. He was drafted 15th overall by the Winnipeg Jets in the 1988 NHL Supplemental Draft while he was at Yale University. He joined the Jets' farm system when he returned to North America in 1990–91.

O'Neill mainly played for the Moncton Hawks of the AHL and the Fort Wayne Komets of the IHL, only playing a few times for the Jets in the 1991–92 and 1992–93 seasons. In the 1993–94 season, he made 17 appearances for the Jets posting a 0–9–1 record. O'Neill returned to the minors and, in 1995–96, made 74 appearances with the Baltimore Bandits, an AHL record.

O'Neill was signed as a free agent by Anaheim and made his debut on December 11, 1997 against Pittsburgh relieving Mikhail Shtalenkov halfway through the second period, allowing 3 goals on 10 shots. He played mainly for the Long Beach Ice Dogs in the IHL. He then signed with the Washington Capitals as a free agent in August 1997 and played 47 games for the Portland Pirates of the AHL in 1997–98.

O'Neill played for EC VSV in Austria in the 1998–99 season before returning to North America to play for the Long Beach Ice Dogs and the Michigan K-Wings during 1999–00 season.

In 2000–01, he played for the Sheffield Steelers of the British Ice Hockey Superleague, and won the B&H Cup, the Challenge Cup, the League Championship and the Playoff Championship.

O'Neill retired from professional hockey following the 2000–01 season. O'Neill holds the record for the most NHL career games without a win.

== Awards and honors ==
Award	Year
All-ECAC Hockey First Team	1986–87
All-ECAC Hockey First Team	1988–89
AHCA East First-Team All-American	1988–89

== Career statistics ==
=== Regular season and playoffs ===
			Regular season									Playoffs
Season	Team	League	GP	W	L	T	MIN	GA	SO	GAA	SV%	GP	W	L	MIN	GA	SO	GAA	SV%
1982–83	Lac St-Louis Lions	QMAAA	20	7	8	5	1198	107	0	5.34	.855	1	0	0	20	3	0	9.00	—
1983–84	Lac St-Louis Lions	QMAAA	22	13	7	2	1307	80	0	3.67	.894	2	1	1	109	10	0	5.50	—
1985–86	Yale University	ECAC	6	3	1	0	389	17	0	3.53	—	—	—	—	—	—	—	—	—
1986–87	Yale University	ECAC	16	9	6	1	964	55	2	3.42	—	—	—	—	—	—	—	—	—
1987–88	Yale University	ECAC	24	6	17	0	1385	101	0	4.37	—	—	—	—	—	—	—	—	—
1988–89	Yale University	ECAC	25	10	14	1	1490	93	0	3.74	—	—	—	—	—	—	—	—	—
1989–90	Tappara Tampere	FIN	44	—	—	—	—	—	—	3.10	.902	7	3	4	419	31	0	4.44	.867
1990–91	Moncton Hawks	AHL	30	13	7	6	1613	84	0	3.12	.896	8	3	4	435	29	0	4.00	—
1990–91	Fort Wayne Komets	IHL	8	5	2	1	490	31	0	3.80	—	—	—	—	—	—	—	—	—
1991–92	Winnipeg Jets	NHL	1	0	0	0	13	1	0	4.62	.857	—	—	—	—	—	—	—	—
1991–92	Moncton Hawks	AHL	32	14	16	2	1902	108	1	3.41	.897	11	4	7	670	43	1	3.85	.891
1991–92	Fort Wayne Komets	IHL	33	22	6	3	1858	97	4	3.13	—	—	—	—	—	—	—	—	—
1992–93	Winnipeg Jets	NHL	2	0	0	1	73	6	0	4.93	.824	—	—	—	—	—	—	—	—
1992–93	Moncton Hawks	AHL	30	13	10	4	1649	88	1	3.20	.905	—	—	—	—	—	—	—	—
1993–94	Winnipeg Jets	NHL	17	0	9	1	738	51	0	4.15	.866	—	—	—	—	—	—	—	—
1993–94	Moncton Hawks	AHL	12	8	4	0	716	33	1	2.76	.902	—	—	—	—	—	—	—	—
1993–94	Fort Wayne Komets	IHL	11	4	4	3	642	38	0	3.55	.869	—	—	—	—	—	—	—	—
1994–95	Fort Wayne Komets	IHL	28	11	12	4	1603	109	0	4.08	.857	—	—	—	—	—	—	—	—
1994–95	Phoenix Roadrunners	IHL	21	13	4	4	1256	64	1	3.06	.903	9	4	5	535	33	0	3.70	.889
1995–96	Baltimore Bandits	AHL	74	31	31	7	4250	250	2	3.53	.889	12	6	6	689	43	0	3.75	.897
1996–97	Mighty Ducks of Anaheim	NHL	1	0	0	0	31	3	0	5.81	.700	—	—	—	—	—	—	—	—
1996–97	Long Beach Ice Dogs	IHL	45	26	12	6	2644	145	1	3.29	.886	1	0	0	7	0	0	0.00	1.000
1997–98	Portland Pirates	AHL	47	16	18	10	2640	135	1	3.07	.904	6	2	3	305	16	0	3.15	.893
1998–99	EC Villacher SV	ALP	22	—	—	—	—	—	—	2.39	—	—	—	—	—	—	—	—	—
1998–99	EC Villacher SV	AUT	20	—	—	—	—	—	—	2.53	—	—	—	—	—	—	—	—	—
1999–00	Long Beach Ice Dogs	IHL	25	7	12	5	1423	71	0	2.99	.894	1	0	1	59	3	0	3.01	.875
1999–00	Michigan K-Wings	IHL	4	1	1	0	155	6	1	2.33	.919	—	—	—	—	—	—	—	—
2000–01	Sheffield Steelers	BISL	30	—	—	—	1603	64	0	2.40	—	7	—	—	420	16	—	2.28	.890
NHL totals			21	0	9	2	856	61	0	4.28	.859	—	—	—	—	—	—	—	—
