= Peter Leboutillier =

Canadian ice hockey player (born 1975)

- Born: January 11, 1975 (age 51) Minnedosa, Manitoba, Canada
- Height: 6 ft 1 in (185 cm)
- Weight: 200 lb (91 kg; 14 st 4 lb)
- Position: Right wing
- Shot: Right
- Played for: Mighty Ducks of Anaheim
- NHL draft: 144th overall, 1993; New York Islanders; 133rd overall, 1995; Mighty Ducks of Anaheim
- Playing career: 1991–2002

Peter Leboutillier (born January 11, 1975) is a Canadian former professional ice hockey winger who played 35 games in the National Hockey League for the Mighty Ducks of Anaheim.

== Career ==
Leboutillier played for the Western Hockey League for the Red Deer Rebels, where he was captain during the 1994–1995 season. He also played in the American Hockey League for the Baltimore Bandits, Cincinnati Mighty Ducks and the Lowell Lock Monsters. He also played in England for the Sheffield Steelers before retiring due to knee injury.

Leboutillier is the director of player development for Team Maryland AAA Hockey and assistant coach for the Maryland Black Bears (NAHL) His career is profiled in the book, Journeymen: 24 Bittersweet Tales of Short Major League Sports Careers.

== Career statistics ==
			Regular season					Playoffs
Season	Team	League	GP	G	A	Pts	PIM	GP	G	A	Pts	PIM
1989–90	Souris/Wawanesa Bantam	MAHA	55	91	109	200	64	—	—	—	—	—
1990–91	Manitoba Southwest Cougars AAA	MMHL	10	7	12	19	6	—	—	—	—	—
1991–92	Neepawa Natives	MJHL	35	11	14	25	99	—	—	—	—	—
1991–92	Brandon Wheat Kings	WHL	2	0	0	0	5	—	—	—	—	—
1992–93	Red Deer Rebels	WHL	67	8	26	34	284	2	0	1	1	5
1993–94	Red Deer Rebels	WHL	66	19	20	39	300	2	0	1	1	4
1994–95	Red Deer Rebels	WHL	59	27	16	43	159	—	—	—	—	—
1995–96	Baltimore Bandits	AHL	68	7	9	16	228	11	0	0	0	33
1996–97	Mighty Ducks of Anaheim	NHL	23	1	0	1	121	—	—	—	—	—
1996–97	Baltimore Bandits	AHL	47	6	12	18	175	—	—	—	—	—
1997–98	Mighty Ducks of Anaheim	NHL	12	1	1	2	55	—	—	—	—	—
1997–98	Cincinnati Mighty Ducks	AHL	51	9	11	20	143	—	—	—	—	—
1998–99	Cincinnati Mighty Ducks	AHL	63	12	12	24	189	3	0	0	0	2
1999–2000	Cincinnati Mighty Ducks	AHL	19	2	1	3	69	—	—	—	—	—
2000–01	Lowell Lock Monsters	AHL	70	6	13	19	175	4	0	1	1	2
2001–02	Sheffield Steelers	GBR	46	6	13	19	146	8	1	1	2	6
NHL totals			35	2	1	3	176	—	—	—	—	—
AHL totals			318	42	58	100	979	18	0	1	1	37
