= Craig Reichert =

Canadian ice hockey player (born 1974)

- Born: May 11, 1974 (age 52) Winnipeg, Manitoba, Canada
- Height: 6 ft 1 in (185 cm)
- Weight: 200 lb (91 kg; 14 st 4 lb)
- Position: Right wing
- Shot: Right
- Played for: Mighty Ducks of Anaheim
- NHL draft: 67th overall, 1994; Mighty Ducks of Anaheim
- Playing career: 1994–2002

Craig Steven Reichert (born May 11, 1974) is a Canadian former professional ice hockey winger who played three games for the Mighty Ducks of Anaheim during the 1996–97 NHL season. Reichert was drafted 67th overall by the Ducks in the 1994 NHL entry draft and had spells in the International Hockey League for the San Diego Gulls and the American Hockey League for the Baltimore Bandits, Cincinnati Mighty Ducks and the Louisville Panthers. He then moved to Germany's Deutsche Eishockey Liga with Düsseldorfer EG in 2000. He had one more season in the AHL for the Hamilton Bulldogs before retiring.

== Career statistics ==
			Regular season					Playoffs
Season	Team	League	GP	G	A	Pts	PIM	GP	G	A	Pts	PIM
1990–91	Calgary Buffaloes Midget AAA	AMHL	47	32	36	68	54	13	13	28	41	27
1991–92	Spokane Chiefs	WHL	68	13	20	33	56	4	1	0	1	4
1992–93	Red Deer Rebels	WHL	66	32	33	65	62	4	3	1	4	2
1993–94	Red Deer Rebels	WHL	72	52	67	119	153	4	2	2	4	8
1988–89	San Diego Gulls	IHL	49	4	12	16	28	—	—	—	—	—
1995–96	Baltimore Bandits	AHL	68	10	17	27	50	1	0	0	0	0
1996–97	Mighty Ducks of Anaheim	NHL	3	0	0	0	0	—	—	—	—	—
1996–97	Baltimore Bandits	AHL	77	22	53	75	54	3	0	2	2	0
1997–98	Cincinnati Mighty Ducks	AHL	78	28	59	87	28	—	—	—	—	—
1998–99	Cincinnati Mighty Ducks	AHL	72	28	41	69	56	3	2	0	2	0
1999–00	Louisville Panthers	AHL	72	16	42	58	41	4	1	1	2	2
2000–01	Düsseldorfer EG	DEL	60	12	23	35	76	—	—	—	—	—
2001–02	Hamilton Bulldogs	AHL	49	10	12	22	26	—	—	—	—	—
NHL totals			3	0	0	0	0	—	—	—	—	—
