= Nikolai Tsulygin =

Russian ice hockey player (born 1975)

- Born: May 29, 1975 (age 50) Ufa, Russian SFSR, Soviet Union
- Height: 6 ft 3 in (191 cm)
- Weight: 225 lb (102 kg; 16 st 1 lb)
- Position: Defence
- Shot: Right
- Played for: Salavat Yulaev Ufa; CSKA Moscow; Mighty Ducks of Anaheim; Ak Bars Kazan; HC Severstal; Metallurg Magnitogorsk; HC Neftekhimik Nizhnekamsk; HC Dynamo Moscow; HC Sibir Novosibirsk; Torpedo Nizhny Novgorod
- NHL draft: 30th overall, 1993; Mighty Ducks of Anaheim
- Playing career: 1992–2008

Nikolai Leonidovich Tsulygin (Russian: Николай Леонидович Цулыгин) born May 29, 1975) is a retired Russian professional ice hockey player. Tsulygin was drafted 30th overall by the Mighty Ducks of Anaheim in the 1993 NHL entry draft, the Ducks' second ever draft pick behind Paul Kariya and played twenty-two games for Anaheim, scoring one assist and collecting eight penalty minutes during the 1996–97 NHL season. Tsulygin returned to Russia in 1999 and remained there until his retirement in 2008.

== Career statistics ==
=== Regular season and playoffs ===
			Regular season					Playoffs
Season	Team	League	GP	G	A	Pts	PIM	GP	G	A	Pts	PIM
1990–91	Salavat Yulaev Ufa	Soviet 2	4	0	0	0	0	—	—	—	—	—
1990–91	Avangard Ufa	Soviet 3	2	0	0	0	0	—	—	—	—	—
1991–92	Salavat Yulaev Ufa	Soviet 2	10	0	1	1	2	—	—	—	—	—
1991–92	Avangard Ufa	Soviet 3	15	1	3	4	8	—	—	—	—	—
1992–93	Salavat Yulaev Ufa	Russia	42	5	4	9	21	2	0	0	0	0
1993–94	Salavat Yulaev Ufa	Russia	43	0	14	14	24	5	0	1	1	0
1994–95	Salavat Yulaev Ufa	Russia	13	2	2	4	10	7	0	0	0	4
1994–95	CSKA Moskva	Russia	16	0	0	0	12	—	—	—	—	—
1994–95	CSKA Moskva II	Russia 2	1	—	0	—	—	—	—	—	—	—
1995–96	Baltimore Bandits	AHL	78	3	18	21	109	12	0	5	5	18
1996–97	Mighty Ducks of Anaheim	NHL	22	0	1	1	8	—	—	—	—	—
1996–97	Baltimore Bandits	AHL	17	4	13	17	8	3	0	0	0	0
1996–97	Fort Wayne Komets	IHL	5	2	1	3	8	—	—	—	—	—
1997–98	Cincinnati Mighty Ducks	AHL	77	5	31	36	63	—	—	—	—	—
1998–99	Fort Wayne Komets	IHL	17	1	4	5	8	—	—	—	—	—
1998–99	Salavat Yulaev Ufa	Russia	27	4	9	13	40	—	—	—	—	—
1999–00	Ak Bars Kazan	Russia	19	1	5	6	18	12	2	0	2	8
2000–01	Salavat Yulaev Ufa	Russia	33	3	5	8	44	—	—	—	—	—
2000–01	Severstal Cherepovets	Russia	10	2	2	4	6	9	0	1	1	10
2001–02	Salavat Yulaev Ufa	Russia	45	3	8	11	12	—	—	—	—	—
2002–03	Metallurg Magnitogorsk	Russia	15	1	2	3	14	—	—	—	—	—
2002–03	Neftekhimik Nizhnekamsk	Russia	19	3	4	7	30	—	—	—	—	—
2003–04	Neftekhimik Nizhnekamsk	Russia	51	7	20	27	54	5	1	1	2	10
2004–05	Salavat Yulaev Ufa	Russia	47	5	5	10	48	—	—	—	—	—
2004–05	Dynamo Moskva	Russia	8	0	0	0	8	5	0	1	1	10
2005–06	Salavat Yulaev Ufa	Russia	37	3	10	13	40	6	0	0	0	8
2006–07	Salavat Yulaev Ufa	Russia	13	0	1	1	14	—	—	—	—	—
2006–07	Sibir Novosibirsk	Russia	33	0	4	4	36	6	0	0	0	18
2007–08	Torpedo Nizhny Novgorod	Russia	14	0	0	0	12	—	—	—	—	—
NHL totals			22	0	1	1	8	—	—	—	—	—
AHL totals			172	12	62	74	180	15	0	5	5	18
Russia totals			485	39	95	134	443	57	3	4	7	64

=== International statistics ===
Year	Team	Event	Place	GP	G	A	Pts	PIM
1993	Russia	WJC	6th	5	0	0	0	2
1994	Russia	WJC	3rd place, bronze medalist(s)	7	1	2	3	12
