= 1996–97 Detroit Red Wings season =

Sports season

1996–97 Detroit Red Wings
- Stanley Cup champions
- Western Conference champions
- Division: 2nd Central
- Conference: 3rd Western
- 1996–97 record: 38–26–18
- Home record: 20–12–9
- Road record: 18–14–9
- Goals for: 253
- Goals against: 197

Team information
- General manager: Scotty Bowman; Jim Devellano
- Coach: Scotty Bowman
- Captain: Steve Yzerman
- Alternate captains: Sergei Fedorov; Brendan Shanahan
- Arena: Joe Louis Arena
- Average attendance: 19,978 (99.9%); Total: 819,107
- Minor league affiliates: Adirondack Red Wings (AHL); Toledo Storm (ECHL)

Team leaders
- Goals: Brendan Shanahan (46)
- Assists: Steve Yzerman (63)
- Points: Brendan Shanahan (87)
- Penalty minutes: Martin Lapointe (167)
- Plus/minus: Vladimir Konstantinov (38)
- Wins: Chris Osgood (23)
- Goals against average: Kevin Hodson (1.63)

The 1996–97 Detroit Red Wings season was the 71st National Hockey League season in Detroit, Michigan. The highlight of the Red Wings season was winning the Stanley Cup, their first since 1955.

== Off-season ==
On July 23, 1996, Detroit Red Wings President Bill Evo resigned his position after serving just ten months at the team's helm. The Nickname "Hockeytown" was coined to launch the start of a five-year marketing campaign.

== Regular season ==
The "HOCKEYTOWN" logo, a Red Wings logo overlapped with the term "HOCKEYTOWN," was shown over center ice starting this season and was still there as of 2022.

A season highlight was Sergei Fedorov's five-goal performance on December 26, 1996, in a game against the Washington Capitals. The Red Wings won 5–4 in overtime. Fedorov's fifth goal of the game came at 2:39 of the overtime period.

On February 8, 1997, coach Scotty Bowman achieved his 1000th victory as an NHL head coach against his previous team, the Pittsburgh Penguins.

On March 26, 1997, the Red Wings–Avalanche brawl continued to fuel the rivalry between the teams. Detroit won that game 6–5 in overtime.

=== Season standings ===
Central Division
No.	CR		GP	W	L	T	GF	GA	Pts
1	2	**Dallas Stars**	82	48	26	8	252	198	104
2	3	**Detroit Red Wings**	82	38	26	18	253	197	94
3	5	**Phoenix Coyotes**	82	38	37	7	240	243	83
4	6	**St. Louis Blues**	82	36	35	11	236	239	83
5	8	**Chicago Blackhawks**	82	34	35	13	223	210	81
6	11	Toronto Maple Leafs	82	30	44	8	230	273	68

Note: CR = Conference rank; GP = Games played; W = Wins; L = Losses; T = Ties; GF = Goals for; GA = Goals against; Pts = Points
Bolded teams qualified for the playoffs.

Western Conference
R		Div	GP	W	L	T	GF	GA	Pts
**1**	**p – Colorado Avalanche**	**PAC**	**82**	**49**	**24**	**9**	**277**	**205**	**107**
**2**	**Dallas Stars**	**CEN**	**82**	**48**	**26**	**8**	**252**	**198**	**104**
**3**	**Detroit Red Wings**	**CEN**	**82**	**38**	**26**	**18**	**253**	**197**	**94**
**4**	**Mighty Ducks of Anaheim**	**PAC**	**82**	**36**	**33**	**13**	**245**	**233**	**85**
**5**	**Phoenix Coyotes**	**CEN**	**82**	**38**	**37**	**7**	**240**	**243**	**83**
**6**	**St. Louis Blues**	**CEN**	**82**	**36**	**35**	**11**	**236**	**239**	**83**
**7**	**Edmonton Oilers**	**PAC**	**82**	**36**	**37**	**9**	**252**	**247**	**81**
**8**	**Chicago Blackhawks**	**CEN**	**82**	**34**	**35**	**13**	**223**	**210**	**81**
9	Vancouver Canucks	PAC	82	35	40	7	257	273	77
10	Calgary Flames	PAC	82	32	41	9	214	239	73
11	Toronto Maple Leafs	CEN	82	30	44	8	230	273	68
12	Los Angeles Kings	PAC	82	28	43	11	214	268	67
13	San Jose Sharks	PAC	82	27	47	8	211	278	62

Divisions: CEN – Central, PAC – Pacific

bold – Qualified for playoffs; p – Won Presidents' Trophy

== Playoffs ==
The Red Wings won the 1997 Stanley Cup Finals, their first Stanley Cup since the 1954–55 NHL season.

Six days after winning the Stanley Cup, tragedy struck when defenseman Vladimir Konstantinov, defenseman Viacheslav Fetisov, and massage therapist Sergei Mnatsakanov were involved in a limousine accident. The driver, who later said he fell asleep, had a suspended license for previous drunk driving convictions.

== Schedule and results ==
=== Regular season ===
1996–97 regular season
October: 7–4–1 (home: 5–1–1; road: 2–3–0)

Game	Date	Visitor	Score	Home	OT	Decision	Attendance	Record	Points	Recap
1	October 5	Detroit	1–3	New Jersey		Osgood	18,622	0–1–0	0	L
2	October 9	Edmonton	0–2	Detroit		Osgood	19,983	1–1–0	2	W
3	October 11	Calgary	2–1	Detroit		Osgood	19,983	1–2–0	2	L
4	October 12	Detroit	6–1	Buffalo		Vernon	18,595	2–2–0	4	W
5	October 15	Detroit	1–3	Dallas		Vernon	15,983	2–3–0	4	L
6	October 17	Detroit	1–2	Chicago		Osgood	18,261	2–4–0	4	L
7	October 19	NY Islanders	2–4	Detroit		Vernon	19,983	3–4–0	6	W
8	October 21	Los Angeles	0–3	Detroit		Osgood	19,849	4–4–0	8	W
9	October 23	Dallas	1–4	Detroit		Osgood	19,983	5–4–0	10	W
10	October 25	Chicago	2–2	Detroit	OT	Hodson	19,983	5–4–1	11	T
11	October 26	Detroit	2–1	Boston		Osgood	17,012	6–4–1	13	W
12	October 30	Montreal	3–5	Detroit		Osgood	19,983	7–4–1	15	W

November: 7–4–2 (home: 4–2–0; road: 3–2–2)

Game	Date	Visitor	Score	Home	OT	Decision	Attendance	Record	Points	Recap
13	November 1	Detroit	2–2	Ottawa	OT	Osgood	14,158	7–4–2	16	T
14	November 2	Detroit	2–6	Toronto		Vernon	15,726	7–5–2	16	L
15	November 4	Hartford	1–5	Detroit		Osgood	19,983	8–5–2	18	W
16	November 6	New Jersey	2–0	Detroit		Osgood	19,983	8–6–2	18	L
17	November 8	Detroit	4–1	Hartford		Vernon	14,660	9–6–2	20	W
18	November 10	Tampa Bay	2–4	Detroit		Osgood	19,983	10–6–2	22	W
19	November 13	Colorado	4–1	Detroit		Osgood	19,983	10–7–2	22	L
20	November 15	San Jose	1–5	Detroit		Vernon	19,983	11–7–2	24	W
21	November 18	Detroit	2–2	Phoenix	OT	Osgood	15,436	11–7–3	25	T
22	November 21	Detroit	6–1	San Jose		Vernon	17,442	12–7–3	27	W
23	November 23	Detroit	6–0	Los Angeles		Osgood	16,005	13–7–3	29	W
24	November 24	Detroit	1–3	Anaheim		Vernon	17,174	13–8–3	29	L
25	November 27	Toronto	2–5	Detroit		Osgood	19,983	14–8–3	31	W

December: 6–4–3 (home: 3–2–2; road: 3–2–1)

Game	Date	Visitor	Score	Home	OT	Decision	Attendance	Record	Points	Recap
26	December 1	Florida	4–2	Detroit		Osgood	19,983	14–9–3	31	L
27	December 3	Vancouver	2–2	Detroit	OT	Osgood	19,921	14–9–4	32	T
28	December 4	Detroit	2–0	Washington		Hodson	16,117	15–9–4	34	W
29	December 10	Edmonton	0–0	Detroit	OT	Osgood	19,983	15–9–5	35	T
30	December 12	Chicago	2–6	Detroit		Osgood	19,983	16–9–5	37	W
31	December 15	Toronto	1–3	Detroit		Osgood	19,983	17–9–5	39	W
32	December 17	Detroit	3–4	Colorado		Vernon	16,061	17–10–5	39	L
33	December 18	Detroit	3–3	Calgary	OT	Osgood	16,237	17–10–6	40	T
34	December 20	Detroit	2–3	Vancouver		Hodson	18,422	17–11–6	40	L
35	December 22	Detroit	6–2	Edmonton		Osgood	16,724	18–11–6	42	W
36	December 26	Washington	4–5	Detroit	OT	Osgood	19,983	19–11–6	44	W
37	December 28	Detroit	7–1	NY Islanders		Vernon	16,297	20–11–6	46	W
38	December 30	Phoenix	5–3	Detroit		Osgood	19,983	20–12–6	46	L

January: 2–5–3 (home: 0–3–2; road: 2–2–1)

Game	Date	Visitor	Score	Home	OT	Decision	Attendance	Record	Points	Recap
39	January 3	Dallas	2–1	Detroit		Vernon	19,983	20–13–6	46	L
40	January 5	Detroit	5–5	Chicago	OT	Vernon	21,914	20–13–7	47	T
41	January 8	Detroit	3–6	Dallas		Osgood	15,326	20–14–7	47	L
42	January 9	Detroit	5–4	Phoenix	OT	Osgood	16,210	21–14–7	49	W
43	January 11	Chicago	3–1	Detroit		Osgood	19,983	21–15–7	49	L
44	January 14	Los Angeles	3–3	Detroit	OT	Osgood	19,983	21–15–8	50	T
45	January 20	Detroit	1–4	Montreal		Vernon	21,273	21–16–8	50	L
46	January 22	Philadelphia	2–2	Detroit	OT	Vernon	19,983	21–16–9	51	T
47	January 25	Detroit	4–1	Philadelphia		Vernon	19,711	22–16–9	53	W
48	January 29	Phoenix	3–0	Detroit		Vernon	19,983	22–17–9	53	L

February: 8–2–3 (home: 4–1–1; road: 4–1–2)

Game	Date	Visitor	Score	Home	OT	Decision	Attendance	Record	Points	Recap
49	February 1	Detroit	4–1	St. Louis		Vernon	20,330	23–17–9	55	W
50	February 2	Dallas	3–4	Detroit	OT	Osgood	19,983	24–17–9	57	W
51	February 4	St. Louis	1–1	Detroit	OT	Vernon	19,983	24–17–10	58	T
52	February 6	Vancouver	7–4	Detroit		Osgood	19,983	24–18–10	58	L
53	February 8	Detroit	6–5	Pittsburgh	OT	Vernon	17,355	25–18–10	60	W
54	February 12	San Jose	1–7	Detroit		Osgood	19,983	26–18–10	62	W
55	February 14	Detroit	3–4	Dallas	OT	Vernon	16,924	26–19–10	62	L
56	February 16	Detroit	4–2	Florida		Osgood	14,703	27–19–10	64	W
57	February 17	Detroit	3–3	Tampa Bay	OT	Vernon	19,579	27–19–11	65	T
58	February 19	Calgary	0–4	Detroit		Osgood	19,983	28–19–11	67	W
59	February 22	Detroit	2–2	St. Louis	OT	Vernon	20,371	28–19–12	68	T
60	February 24	Detroit	5–3	Phoenix		Osgood	16,210	29–19–12	70	W
61	February 27	Pittsburgh	1–4	Detroit		Vernon	19,983	30–19–12	72	W

March: 6–5–3 (home: 4–1–1; road: 2–4–2)

Game	Date	Visitor	Score	Home	OT	Decision	Attendance	Record	Points	Recap
62	March 1	NY Rangers	0–3	Detroit		Osgood	19,983	31–19–12	74	W
63	March 2	Anaheim	1–1	Detroit	OT	Vernon	19,983	31–19–13	75	T
64	March 5	Detroit	4–4	Toronto	OT	Osgood	15,726	31–19–14	76	T
65	March 8	Detroit	5–3	Vancouver		Vernon	18,422	32–19–14	78	W
66	March 10	Detroit	3–3	Los Angeles	OT	Osgood	10,663	32–19–15	79	T
67	March 12	Detroit	1–2	Anaheim		Vernon	17,174	32–20–15	79	L
68	March 15	Detroit	7–4	San Jose		Osgood	17,442	33–20–15	81	W
69	March 16	Detroit	2–4	Colorado		Osgood	16,061	33–21–15	81	L
70	March 19	Boston	1–4	Detroit		Hodson	19,983	34–21–15	83	W
71	March 21	Detroit	1–3	NY Rangers		Osgood	18,200	34–22–15	83	L
72	March 23	Detroit	3–5	Chicago		Hodson	22,422	34–23–15	83	L
73	March 26	Colorado	5–6	Detroit	OT	Vernon	19,983	35–23–15	85	W
74	March 28	Buffalo	1–2	Detroit	OT	Vernon	19,983	36–23–15	87	W
75	March 30	Anaheim	1–0	Detroit	OT	Vernon	19,983	36–24–15	87	L

April: 2–2–3 (home: 0–2–2; road: 2–0–1)

Game	Date	Visitor	Score	Home	OT	Decision	Attendance	Record	Points	Recap
76	April 1	St. Louis	1–1	Detroit	OT	Vernon	19,983	36–24–16	88	T
77	April 3	Toronto	2–2	Detroit	OT	Osgood	19,983	36–24–17	89	T
78	April 5	Detroit	4–2	Toronto		Osgood	15,726	37–24–17	91	W
79	April 8	Detroit	3–2	Calgary	OT	Osgood	17,841	38–24–17	93	W
80	April 9	Detroit	3–3	Edmonton	OT	Vernon	17,099	38–24–18	94	T
81	April 11	Ottawa	3–2	Detroit		Vernon	19,983	38–25–18	94	L
82	April 13	St. Louis	3–1	Detroit		Osgood	19,983	38–26–18	94	L

Legend: W Win (2 points) L Loss (0 points) T Tie (1 point)

=== Playoffs ===
1997 Stanley Cup playoffs
Western Conference Quarterfinals vs. (6) St. Louis Blues: Detroit won 4–2

Game	Date	Visitor	Score	Home	OT	Decision	Series	Recap
1	April 16	St. Louis	2–0	Detroit		Vernon	0–1	L
2	April 18	St. Louis	1–2	Detroit		Vernon	1–1	W
3	April 20	Detroit	3–2	St. Louis		Vernon	2–1	W
4	April 22	Detroit	0–4	St. Louis		Vernon	2–2	L
5	April 25	St. Louis	2–5	Detroit		Vernon	3–2	W
6	April 27	Detroit	3–1	St. Louis		Vernon	4–2	W

Western Conference Semifinals vs. (4) Mighty Ducks of Anaheim: Detroit won 4–0

Game	Date	Visitor	Score	Home	OT	Decision	Series	Recap
1	May 2	Anaheim	1–2	Detroit	OT	Vernon	1–0	W
2	May 4	Anaheim	2–3	Detroit	3OT	Vernon	2–0	W
3	May 6	Detroit	5–2	Anaheim		Vernon	3–0	W
4	May 8	Detroit	3–2	Anaheim	2OT	Vernon	4–0	W

Western Conference Finals vs. (1) Colorado Avalanche: Detroit won 4–2

Game	Date	Visitor	Score	Home	OT	Decision	Series	Recap
1	May 15	Detroit	1–2	Colorado		Vernon	0–1	L
2	May 17	Detroit	4–2	Colorado		Vernon	1–1	W
3	May 19	Colorado	1–2	Detroit		Vernon	2–1	W
4	May 22	Colorado	0–6	Detroit		Vernon	3–1	W
5	May 24	Detroit	0–6	Colorado		Vernon	3–2	L
6	May 26	Colorado	1–3	Detroit		Vernon	4–2	W

Stanley Cup Finals vs. (E3) Philadelphia Flyers: Detroit won 4–0

Game	Date	Visitor	Score	Home	OT	Decision	Series	Recap
1	May 31	Detroit	4–2	Philadelphia		Vernon	1–0	W
2	June 3	Detroit	4–2	Philadelphia		Vernon	2–0	W
3	June 5	Philadelphia	1–6	Detroit		Vernon	3–0	W
4	June 7	Philadelphia	1–2	Detroit		Vernon	4–0	W

Legend: W Win L Loss

== Player statistics ==
=== Scoring ===
- Position abbreviations: C = Center; D = Defense; G = Goaltender; LW = Left wing; RW = Right wing
- † = Joined team via a transaction (e.g., trade, waivers, signing) during the season. Stats reflect time with the Red Wings only.
- ‡ = Left team via a transaction (e.g., trade, waivers, release) during the season. Stats reflect time with the Red Wings only.

No.	Player	Pos	Regular season						Playoffs					
No.	Player	Pos	GP	G	A	Pts	+/-	PIM	GP	G	A	Pts	+/-	PIM
14	Brendan Shanahan†	LW	79	46	41	87	31	131	20	9	8	17	8	43
19	Steve Yzerman	LW	81	22	63	85	22	78	20	7	6	13	3	4
91	Sergei Fedorov	C	74	30	33	63	29	30	20	8	12	20	5	12
5	Nicklas Lidstrom	D	79	15	42	57	11	30	20	2	6	8	12	2
8	Igor Larionov	C	64	12	42	54	31	26	20	4	8	12	8	8
25	Darren McCarty	RW	68	19	30	49	14	126	20	3	4	7	1	34
13	Vyacheslav Kozlov	C	75	23	22	45	21	46	20	8	5	13	3	14
16	Vladimir Konstantinov	D	77	5	33	38	38	151	20	0	4	4	−1	29
20	Martin Lapointe	RW	78	16	17	33	−14	167	20	4	8	12	8	60
2	Viacheslav Fetisov	D	64	5	23	28	26	76	20	0	4	4	2	42
28	Tomas Sandstrom†	RW	34	9	9	18	2	36	20	0	4	4	−3	24
23	Greg Johnson‡	RW	43	6	10	16	−5	12	—	—	—	—	—	—
33	Kris Draper	C	76	8	5	13	−11	73	20	2	4	6	5	12
17	Doug Brown	LW	49	6	7	13	−3	8	14	3	3	6	4	2
3	Bob Rouse	D	70	4	9	13	8	58	22	0	0	0	8	55
11	Mathieu Dandenault	RW	65	3	9	12	−10	28	—	—	—	—	—	—
4	Jamie Pushor	D	75	4	7	11	1	129	5	0	1	1	−1	5
15	Tomas Holmstrom	LW	47	6	3	9	−10	33	1	0	0	0	−1	0
18	Kirk Maltby	LW	66	3	5	8	3	75	20	5	2	7	6	24
37	Tim Taylor	C	44	3	4	7	−6	52	2	0	0	0	−1	0
27 (Note: Ward wore number 14 in the season opener.)	Aaron Ward	D	49	2	5	7	−9	52	19	0	0	0	1	17
55	Larry Murphy†	D	12	2	4	6	2	0	20	2	9	11	16	8
34 (Note: Eriksson wore number 26 through November 13 and number 38 from January 8 through January 11.)	Anders Eriksson	D	23	0	6	6	5	10	—	—	—	—	—	—
26	Joe Kocur†	RW	34	2	1	3	−7	70	19	1	3	4	5	22
21	Bob Errey‡	LW	36	1	2	3	−3	27	—	—	—	—	—	—
30	Chris Osgood	G	47	0	2	2		6	2	0	0	0		2
22	Mike Knuble	RW	9	1	0	1	−1	0	—	—	—	—	—	—
31	Kevin Hodson	G	6	0	1	1		0	—	—	—	—	—	—
32	Stu Grimson‡	LW	1	0	0	0	−1	0	—	—	—	—	—	—
40	Mark Major	LW	2	0	0	0	0	5	—	—	—	—	—	—
23	Mike Ramsey†‡	D	2	0	0	0	0	0	—	—	—	—	—	—
29	Mike Vernon	G	33	0	0	0		35	20	0	1	1		12

=== Goaltending ===
No.	Player	Regular season											Playoffs									
No.	Player	GP	GS	W	L	T	SA	GA	GAA	SV%	SO	TOI	GP	GS	W	L	SA	GA	GAA	SV%	SO	TOI
30	Chris Osgood	47	45	23	13	9	1,175	106	2.30	.910	6	2,768:48	2	0	0	0	21	2	2.54	.905	0	47:10
29	Mike Vernon	33	33	13	11	8	782	79	2.43	.899	0	1,952:03	20	20	16	4	494	36	1.76	.927	1	1,229:12
31	Kevin Hodson	6	4	2	2	1	114	8	1.63	.930	1	293:47	—	—	—	—	—	—	—	—	—	—

== Awards and records ==
=== Awards ===
Vladimir Konstantinov was the runner-up for the James Norris Memorial Trophy.

Type	Award/honor	Recipient	Ref
League (annual)	Conn Smythe Trophy	Mike Vernon	
League (in-season)	NHL All-Star Game selection	Viacheslav Fetisov (Note: Fetisov was selected by the commissioner.)	
League (in-season)	NHL All-Star Game selection	Chris Osgood (Note: Osgood did not play and was replaced by Guy Hebert of the Anaheim Mighty Ducks.)	
League (in-season)	NHL All-Star Game selection	Brendan Shanahan (Note: Shanahan was an injury replacement for Peter Forsberg of the Colorado Avalanche.)	
League (in-season)	NHL All-Star Game selection	Steve Yzerman	

=== Milestones ===
Milestone	Player	Date	Ref
First game	Tomas Holmstrom	October 5, 1996	
First game	Mark Major	November 1, 1996	
First game	Mike Knuble	March 26, 1997	
1,000th game played	Steve Yzerman	February 19, 1997	

== Transactions ==
=== Trades ===
Date	Details	
June 14, 1996	To Edmonton Oilers Bob Essensa	To Detroit Red Wings Future Considerations
August 27, 1996	To Tampa Bay Lightning Dino Ciccarelli	To Detroit Red Wings 1998 4th-round pick (#87th overall)
October 9, 1996	To Hartford Whalers Paul Coffey; Keith Primeau; 1997 1st-round pick (22nd overall)	To Detroit Red Wings Brian Glynn; Brendan Shanahan
November 8, 1996	To Montreal Canadiens Jason MacDonald	To Detroit Red Wings Cash
January 27, 1997	To Pittsburgh Penguins Greg Johnson	To Detroit Red Wings Tomas Sandström
March 18, 1997	To Toronto Maple Leafs Future Considerations	To Detroit Red Wings Larry Murphy

=== Free agents ===
Date	Player	Team
July 9, 1996	Marc Bergevin	to St. Louis Blues
September 26, 1996	Dave Chyzowski	to Chicago Blackhawks
December 27, 1996	Joe Kocur	from Vancouver Canucks
June 9, 1997	Stacy Roest	

=== Signings ===
Date	Player	Contract term
May 21, 1997	Maxim Kuznetsov	3-year

=== Waivers ===
Date	Player	Team
October 12, 1996	Stu Grimson	to Hartford Whalers
February 8, 1997	Bob Errey	to San Jose Sharks

=== Retirement ===
Date	Player
March 18, 1997	Mike Ramsey

== Draft picks ==
Detroit's picks at the 1996 NHL entry draft.

Round	#	Player	Position	Nationality	College/Junior/Club team (League)
1	26	Jesse Wallin	D	Canada	Red Deer Rebels (WHL)
2	52	Aren Miller	G	Canada	Spokane Chiefs (WHL)
4	108	Johan Forsander	LW	Sweden	HV71 (SEL)
5	135	Michal Podolka	G	Czech Republic	Sault Ste. Marie Greyhounds (OHL)
6^{1}	144	Magnus Nilsson	LW	Sweden	Malmo IF (SEL)
6	162	Alexandre Jacques	C	Canada	Shawinigan Cataractes (QMJHL)
7	189	Colin Beardsmore	C	Canada	North Bay Centennials (OHL)
8	215	Craig Stahl	RW	Canada	Tri-City Americans (WHL)
9	241	Yevgeni Afanasyev	LW	Canada	Flint Generals (CoHL)

Notes

1. The Red Wings acquired this pick as the result of a trade on April 4, 1995 that sent Mike Sillinger and Jason York to Anaheim in exchange for Stu Grimson, Mark Ferner and this pick.
- The Red Wings third-round pick went to the Boston Bruins as the result of a trade on August 17, 1995 that sent David Shaw to Tampa Bay in exchange for this pick (80th overall).

Tampa Bay previously acquired this pick as the result of a trade on August 17, 1995 that sent Marc Bergevin and Ben Hankinson to Detroit in exchange for Shawn Burr and this pick.
