= 1996–97 Calgary Flames season =

NHL team season

1996–97 Calgary Flames
- Division: 5th Pacific
- Conference: 10th Western
- 1996–97 record: 32–41–9
- Home record: 21–18–2
- Road record: 11–23–7
- Goals for: 214
- Goals against: 239

Team information
- General manager: Al Coates
- Coach: Pierre Page
- Captain: Theoren Fleury
- Arena: Canadian Airlines Saddledome
- Average attendance: 17,089
- Minor league affiliates: Saint John Flames; Roanoke Express

Team leaders
- Goals: Theoren Fleury (29)
- Assists: Theoren Fleury (38)
- Points: Theoren Fleury (67)
- Penalty minutes: Todd Simpson (208)
- Plus/minus: Yves Racine (+4)
- Wins: Trevor Kidd (21)
- Goals against average: Trevor Kidd (2.84)

The 1996–97 Calgary Flames season was the 17th National Hockey League season in Calgary. It was another season of decline, as the Flames began the rebuilding process after remaining near the top of the league standings for nearly a decade. Finishing 5th in the Pacific Division, the Flames missed the playoffs for the first time since 1992, and for only the second time since coming to Calgary.

As a result of missing the playoffs, the Flames fired head coach Pierre Page following the season, replacing him with Brian Sutter. Page ended his Flames career with a coaching record of 66–78–20. His .463 winning percentage was, at the time, the worst for any coach in Flames history.

On November 23, 1996, rugged forward Sasha Lakovic authored one of the more memorable moments in the history of the Battle of Alberta when he attempted to leap over the glass at Northlands Coliseum in Edmonton to attack a drunken fan who had reached over the barrier to dump a beer on the head of Flames assistant coach Guy Lapointe. Lakovic, who was held back by his teammates from going into the crowd, was suspended two games, while the Edmonton Oilers were fined $20,000 for having inadequate security.

Theoren Fleury was named to the Western Conference team at the 47th National Hockey League All-Star Game, where he recorded an assist.

Rookie forward Jarome Iginla, acquired the previous season in a trade for Joe Nieuwendyk led all NHL rookies in scoring at 50 points. Despite his success, Iginla failed to win the Calder Memorial Trophy, as defenceman Bryan Berard was voted the league's top rookie. Iginla was named to the All-Rookie team, however.

== Regular season ==
The Flames allowed the most shorthanded goals in the league in 1996–97, with 19.

=== Season standings ===
Pacific Division
No.	CR		GP	W	L	T	GF	GA	Pts
1	1	**Colorado Avalanche**	82	49	24	9	277	205	107
2	4	**Mighty Ducks of Anaheim**	82	36	33	13	243	231	85
3	7	**Edmonton Oilers**	82	36	37	9	252	247	81
4	9	Vancouver Canucks	82	35	40	7	257	273	77
5	10	Calgary Flames	82	32	41	9	214	239	73
6	12	Los Angeles Kings	82	28	43	11	214	268	67
7	13	San Jose Sharks	82	27	47	8	211	278	62

Note: CR = Conference rank; GP = Games played; W = Wins; L = Losses; T = Ties; GF = Goals for; GA = Goals against; Pts = Points
Bolded teams qualified for the playoffs.

Western Conference
R		Div	GP	W	L	T	GF	GA	Pts
**1**	**p – Colorado Avalanche**	**PAC**	**82**	**49**	**24**	**9**	**277**	**205**	**107**
**2**	**Dallas Stars**	**CEN**	**82**	**48**	**26**	**8**	**252**	**198**	**104**
**3**	**Detroit Red Wings**	**CEN**	**82**	**38**	**26**	**18**	**253**	**197**	**94**
**4**	**Mighty Ducks of Anaheim**	**PAC**	**82**	**36**	**33**	**13**	**245**	**233**	**85**
**5**	**Phoenix Coyotes**	**CEN**	**82**	**38**	**37**	**7**	**240**	**243**	**83**
**6**	**St. Louis Blues**	**CEN**	**82**	**36**	**35**	**11**	**236**	**239**	**83**
**7**	**Edmonton Oilers**	**PAC**	**82**	**36**	**37**	**9**	**252**	**247**	**81**
**8**	**Chicago Blackhawks**	**CEN**	**82**	**34**	**35**	**13**	**223**	**210**	**81**
9	Vancouver Canucks	PAC	82	35	40	7	257	273	77
10	Calgary Flames	PAC	82	32	41	9	214	239	73
11	Toronto Maple Leafs	CEN	82	30	44	8	230	273	68
12	Los Angeles Kings	PAC	82	28	43	11	214	268	67
13	San Jose Sharks	PAC	82	27	47	8	211	278	62

Divisions: CEN – Central, PAC – Pacific

bold – Qualified for playoffs; p – Won Presidents' Trophy

== Schedule and results ==
1996–97 regular season
October: 7–5–1 (home: 4–1–0; road: 3–4–1)

Game	Date	Visitor	Score	Home	OT	Decision	Attendance	Record	Pts	Recap
1	October 5	Calgary	1 – 3	Vancouver		Kidd	17,501	0–1–0	0	L
2	October 6	Buffalo	0 – 3	Calgary		Tabaracci	17,311	1–1–0	2	W
3	October 9	St. Louis	3 – 1	Calgary		Tabaracci	15,011	1–2–0	2	L
4	October 11	Calgary	2 – 1	Detroit		Kidd	19,983	2–2–0	4	W
5	October 13	Calgary	1 – 0	Philadelphia		Kidd	N/A	3–2–0	6	W
6	October 14	Calgary	4 – 5	NY Rangers		Kidd	18,200	3–3–0	6	L
7	October 16	Calgary	2 – 4	Montreal		Tabaracci	20,597	3–4–0	6	L
8	October 20	Edmonton	3 – 6	Calgary		Kidd	16,295	4–4–0	8	W
9	October 22	Colorado	1 – 5	Calgary		Kidd	15,644	5–4–0	10	W
10	October 24	Pittsburgh	5 – 7	Calgary		Kidd	15,856	6–4–0	12	W
11	October 26	Calgary	0 – 0	Los Angeles	OT	Kidd	12,787	6–4–1	13	T
12	October 27	Calgary	4 – 1	Anaheim		Tabaracci	16,592	7–4–1	15	W
13	October 30	Calgary	1 – 3	San Jose		Kidd	17,442	7–5–1	15	L

November: 3–9–1 (home: 2–5–0; road: 1–4–1)

Game	Date	Visitor	Score	Home	OT	Decision	Attendance	Record	Pts	Recap
14	November 1	Phoenix	3 – 2	Calgary	OT	Tabaracci	16,246	7–6–1	15	L
15	November 2	Calgary	3 – 4	Vancouver		Kidd	17,546	7–7–1	15	L
16	November 9	St. Louis	3 – 2	Calgary		Tabaracci	16,786	7–8–1	15	L
17	November 13	Calgary	3 – 3	Dallas	OT	Roloson	16,149	7–8–2	16	T
18	November 14	Calgary	2 – 1	Chicago	OT	Kidd	17,359	8–8–2	18	W
19	November 16	Calgary	0 – 2	St. Louis		Kidd	16,834	8–9–2	18	L
20	November 18	NY Rangers	3 – 5	Calgary		Kidd	18,173	9–9–2	20	W
21	November 20	Dallas	3 – 1	Calgary		Kidd	15,173	9–10–2	20	L
22	November 22	Chicago	5 – 2	Calgary		Kidd	16,613	9–11–2	20	L
23	November 23	Calgary	2 – 3	Edmonton		Roloson	16,829	9–12–2	20	L
24	November 26	Edmonton	10 – 1	Calgary		Kidd	17,146	9–13–2	20	L
25	November 28	Los Angeles	0 – 2	Calgary		Roloson	15,367	10–13–2	22	W
26	November 30	Calgary	1 – 3	Phoenix		Roloson	15,988	10–14–2	22	L

December: 3–7–3 (home: 1–3–2; road: 2–4–1)

Game	Date	Visitor	Score	Home	OT	Decision	Attendance	Record	Pts	Recap
27	December 3	Calgary	1 – 3	NY Islanders		Kidd	8,716	10–15–2	22	L
28	December 5	Calgary	1 – 2	New Jersey		Roloson	13,539	10–16–2	22	L
29	December 7	Calgary	1 – 1	Boston	OT	Kidd	15,055	10–16–3	23	T
30	December 10	Ottawa	5 – 5	Calgary	OT	Roloson	16,103	10–16–4	24	T
31	December 12	Calgary	5 – 1	Los Angeles		Roloson	9,620	11–16–4	26	W
32	December 14	Colorado	1 – 4	Calgary		Roloson	N/A	12–16–4	28	W
33	December 16	New Jersey	5 – 0	Calgary		Roloson	15,186	12–17–4	28	L
34	December 18	Detroit	3 – 3	Calgary	OT	Kidd	16,237	12–17–5	29	T
35	December 20	Calgary	0 – 7	Anaheim		Kidd	17,084	12–18–5	29	L
36	December 22	Calgary	7 – 2	Phoenix		Roloson	15,537	13–18–5	31	W
37	December 23	Calgary	3 – 4	Colorado		Roloson	16,061	13–19–5	31	L
38	December 29	Philadelphia	4 – 2	Calgary		Kidd	18,882	13–20–5	31	L
39	December 31	San Jose	5 – 1	Calgary		Roloson	18,882	13–21–5	31	L

January: 5–5–1 (home: 4–2–0; road: 1–3–1)

Game	Date	Visitor	Score	Home	OT	Decision	Attendance	Record	Pts	Recap
40	January 2	Calgary	2 – 3	Colorado		Kidd	16,061	13–22–5	31	L
41	January 4	Calgary	4 – 3	San Jose		Kidd	17,442	14–22–5	33	W
42	January 7	Toronto	3 – 4	Calgary	OT	Kidd	17,345	15–22–5	35	W
43	January 9	Hartford	2 – 3	Calgary		Roloson	17,121	16–22–5	37	W
44	January 11	Florida	4 – 1	Calgary		Roloson	17,273	16–23–5	37	L
45	January 15	Anaheim	1 – 2	Calgary		Kidd	16,207	17–23–5	39	W
46	January 21	Calgary	2 – 4	Pittsburgh		Kidd	16,764	17–24–5	39	L
47	January 22	Calgary	3 – 5	Toronto		Roloson	15,685	17–25–5	39	L
48	January 24	Calgary	2 – 2	Ottawa	OT	Kidd	13,306	17–25–6	40	T
49	January 28	NY Islanders	3 – 4	Calgary		Kidd	16,072	18–25–6	42	W
50	January 30	San Jose	6 – 3	Calgary		Kidd	16,117	18–26–6	42	L

February: 8–5–1 (home: 7–2–0; road: 1–3–1)

Game	Date	Visitor	Score	Home	OT	Decision	Attendance	Record	Pts	Recap
51	February 1	Vancouver	0 – 3	Calgary		Kidd	18,661	19–26–6	44	W
52	February 3	Los Angeles	3 – 2	Calgary		Kidd	16,328	19–27–6	44	L
53	February 5	Calgary	2 – 5	Edmonton		Kidd	16,770	19–28–6	44	L
54	February 7	Washington	2 – 5	Calgary		Kidd	16,686	20–28–6	46	W
55	February 9	Anaheim	1 – 6	Calgary		Kidd	16,219	21–28–6	48	W
56	February 11	Boston	1 – 5	Calgary		Kidd	18,332	22–28–6	50	W
57	February 13	Edmonton	2 – 3	Calgary	OT	Kidd	18,882	23–28–6	52	W
58	February 15	Toronto	0 – 3	Calgary		Kidd	18,882	24–28–6	54	W
59	February 18	Calgary	5 – 5	Buffalo	OT	Roloson	15,867	24–28–7	55	T
60	February 19	Calgary	0 – 4	Detroit		Kidd	19,983	24–29–7	55	L
61	February 21	Calgary	2 – 4	Dallas		Kidd	16,924	24–30–7	55	L
62	February 23	Calgary	5 – 3	St. Louis		Roloson	19,154	25–30–7	57	W
63	February 26	Phoenix	5 – 2	Calgary		Kidd	16,651	25–31–7	57	L
64	February 28	Montreal	2 – 3	Calgary		Roloson	18,882	26–31–7	59	W

March: 6–5–1 (home: 3–2–0; road: 3–3–1)

Game	Date	Visitor	Score	Home	OT	Decision	Attendance	Record	Pts	Recap
65	March 1	Dallas	1 – 4	Calgary		Roloson	17,787	27–31–7	61	W
66	March 4	Calgary	1 – 2	Washington		Roloson	10,003	27–32–7	61	L
67	March 5	Calgary	0 – 2	Hartford		Kidd	12,140	27–33–7	61	L
68	March 7	Calgary	3 – 1	Florida		Roloson	14,703	28–33–7	63	W
69	March 9	Calgary	1 – 2	Tampa Bay	OT	Roloson	15,636	28–34–7	63	L
70	March 12	Calgary	3 – 2	Colorado		Kidd	16,061	29–34–7	65	W
71	March 15	Calgary	5 – 2	Los Angeles		Kidd	15,135	30–34–7	67	W
72	March 16	Calgary	2 – 2	Anaheim	OT	Kidd	17,174	30–34–8	68	T
73	March 19	San Jose	2 – 4	Calgary		Kidd	16,610	31–34–8	70	W
74	March 21	Tampa Bay	4 – 3	Calgary	OT	Kidd	17,278	31–35–8	70	L
75	March 25	Anaheim	2 – 3	Calgary		Kidd	17,118	32–35–8	72	W
76	March 29	Vancouver	5 – 2	Calgary		Kidd	18,882	32–36–8	72	L

April: 0–5–1 (home: 0–3–0; road: 0–2–1)

Game	Date	Visitor	Score	Home	OT	Decision	Attendance	Record	Pts	Recap
77	April 2	Colorado	5 – 1	Calgary		Roloson	18,882	32–37–8	72	L
78	April 4	Calgary	3 – 3	Vancouver	OT	Kidd	18,422	32–37–9	73	T
79	April 6	Chicago	2 – 1	Calgary		Kidd	18,397	32–38–9	73	L
80	April 7	Detroit	3 – 2	Calgary	OT	Roloson	17,841	32–39–9	73	L
81	April 11	Calgary	3 – 7	Chicago		Roloson	22,475	32–40–9	73	L
82	April 12	Calgary	1 – 4	Toronto		Roloson	15,726	32–41–9	73	L

Legend: W Win (2 points) L Loss (0 points) T Tie (1 point)

== Player statistics ==
=== Scoring ===
- Position abbreviations: C = Centre; D = Defence; G = Goaltender; LW = Left wing; RW = Right wing
- † = Joined team via a transaction (e.g., trade, waivers, signing) during the season. Stats reflect time with the Flames only.
- ‡ = Left team via a transaction (e.g., trade, waivers, release) during the season. Stats reflect time with the Flames only.

No.	Player	Pos	Regular season					
No.	Player	Pos	GP	G	A	Pts	+/-	PIM
14	Theoren Fleury	RW	81	29	38	67	−12	104
51	Dave Gagner	C	82	27	33	60	2	48
13	German Titov	LW	79	22	30	52	−12	36
12 (Note: Iginla wore number 24 through December 31.)	Jarome Iginla	RW	82	21	29	50	−4	37
26	Robert Reichel‡	C	70	16	27	43	−2	22
44	Jonas Hoglund	LW	68	19	16	35	−4	12
34	Corey Millen	C	61	11	15	26	−19	32
16	Cory Stillman	LW	58	6	20	26	−6	14
20	Todd Hlushko	LW	58	7	11	18	−2	49
22	Ronnie Stern	RW	79	7	10	17	−4	157
23	Aaron Gavey†	C	41	7	9	16	−11	34
21	Steve Chiasson‡	D	47	5	11	16	−11	32
36 (Note: Racine wore number 4 in his first game.)	Yves Racine†	D	46	1	15	16	4	24
5	Tommy Albelin	D	72	4	11	15	−8	14
27	Todd Simpson	D	82	1	13	14	−14	208
42	Ed Ward	LW	40	5	8	13	−3	49
32	Mike Sullivan	RW	67	5	6	11	−11	10
19	Chris O'Sullivan	D	27	2	8	10	0	2
6	Joel Bouchard	D	76	4	5	9	−23	49
15	Sandy McCarthy	RW	33	3	5	8	−8	113
18	Marty McInnis†	C	10	3	4	7	−1	2
29	Cale Hulse	D	63	1	6	7	−2	91
3	James Patrick	D	19	3	1	4	2	6
4	Glen Featherstone†	D	13	1	3	4	−1	19
7	Jamie Huscroft‡	D	39	0	4	4	2	117
17	Hnat Domenichelli†	LW	10	1	2	3	1	2
41	Dale McTavish	C	9	1	2	3	−4	2
12	Paul Kruse‡	LW	14	2	0	2	−4	30
37	Trevor Kidd	G	55	0	2	2		16
8	Sami Helenius	D	3	0	1	1	1	0
38	Sasha Lakovic†	LW	19	0	1	1	−1	54
2	Jamie Allison	D	20	0	0	0	−4	35
45	Marko Jantunen	C	3	0	0	0	−1	0
28	Marty Murray	C	2	0	0	0	0	4
30	Dwayne Roloson	G	31	0	0	0		2
35	Paxton Schulte	LW	1	0	0	0	1	2
31	Rick Tabaracci‡	G	7	0	0	0		0
33	Zarley Zalapski	D	2	0	0	0	−1	0

=== Goaltending ===
- ‡ = Left team via a transaction (e.g., trade, waivers, release) during the season. Stats reflect time with the Flames only.

No.	Player	Regular season									
No.	Player	GP	W	L	T	SA	GA	GAA	SV%	SO	TOI
37	Trevor Kidd	55	21	23	6	1416	141	2.84	.900	4	2979
30	Dwayne Roloson	31	9	14	3	760	78	2.89	.897	1	1618
31	Rick Tabaracci‡	7	2	4	0	155	14	2.33	.910	1	361

== Awards and records ==
=== Awards ===
Type	Award/honour	Recipient	Ref
League (annual)	NHL All-Rookie Team	Jarome Iginla (Forward)	
League (in-season)	NHL All-Star Game selection	Theoren Fleury	
Team	Molson Cup	Trevor Kidd	
Team	Ralph T. Scurfield Humanitarian Award	Mike Sullivan	

=== Milestones ===
Milestone	Player	Date	Ref
First game	Jonas Hoglund	October 5, 1996	
First game	Chris O'Sullivan	October 5, 1996	
First game	Marko Jantunen	October 9, 1996	
First game	Sasha Lakovic	October 11, 1996	
First game	Dwayne Roloson	November 13, 1996	
First game	Sami Helenius	December 14, 1996	
First game	Dale McTavish	December 31, 1996	

== Transactions ==
The Flames were involved in the following transactions during the 1996–97 season.

=== Trades ===
November 19, 1996	To Calgary Flames Aaron Gavey	To Tampa Bay Lightning Rick Tabaracci
March 5, 1997	To Calgary Flames Hnat Domenichelli; Glen Featherstone; 2nd round pick in 1997; 3rd round pick in 1998	To Hartford Whalers Steve Chiasson; Conditional pick in 1997
March 18, 1997	To Calgary Flames Marty McInnis; Tyrone Garner; 6th round pick in 1997	To New York Islanders Robert Reichel

=== Free agents ===
Player / Former team	Player / New team

== Draft picks ==
Calgary's picks at the 1996 NHL entry draft, held in St. Louis, Missouri.

Rnd	Pick	Player	Nationality	Position	Team (league)	NHL statistics				
Rnd	Pick	Player	Nationality	Position	Team (league)	GP	G	A	Pts	PIM
1	13	Derek Morris	Canada	D	Regina Pats (WHL)	1107	92	332	424	1004
2	39	Travis Brigley	Canada	LW	Lethbridge Hurricanes (WHL)	55	3	6	9	16
2	40	Steve Begin	Canada	C	Val-d'Or Foreurs (QMHJL)	524	56	52	108	561
3	73	Dmitri Vlasenkov	Russia	LW	Torpedo Yaroslavl (RSL)					
4	89	Toni Lydman	Finland	D	Tappara (SM-liiga)	847	36	206	242	551
4	94	Christian Lefebvre	Canada	D	Granby Prédateurs (QMJHL)					
5	122	Josef Straka	Czech Republic	C	HC Litvínov (Czech)					
8	202	Ryan Wade	Canada	F	Kelowna Rockets (WHL)					
9	228	Ronald Petrovicky	Slovakia	RW	Prince George Cougars (WHL)	342	41	51	92	429

== Farm teams ==
=== Saint John Flames ===
The Baby Flames finished the 1996–97 American Hockey League season in second place in the Canadian Division with a 28–36–13–3 record. They were defeated in three games to two by the Hamilton Bulldogs in the first round of the playoffs, however. Jarrod Skalde led the Flames with 32 goals and 68 points. Darrin Madeley was the starting goaltender, posting an 11–18–11 record with a 3.21 GAA in 46 games.

== See also ==
- 1996–97 NHL season
