= Jayson More =

Canadian ice hockey player and coach

- Born: January 12, 1969 (age 57) Souris, Manitoba, Canada
- Height: 6 ft 1 in (185 cm)
- Weight: 210 lb (95 kg; 15 st 0 lb)
- Position: Defence
- Shot: Right
- Played for: New York Rangers; Minnesota North Stars; San Jose Sharks; Phoenix Coyotes; Chicago Blackhawks; Nashville Predators
- NHL draft: 10th overall, 1987; New York Rangers
- Playing career: 1988–1999

Jayson William More (born January 12, 1969) is a Canadian professional ice hockey coach and former player. More was drafted by the New York Rangers in the first round, 10th overall, in the 1987 NHL entry draft.

Born in Souris, Manitoba, More played four seasons in the Western Hockey League junior league. More made his professional debut as a 19-year-old with the International Hockey League's Denver Rangers in the 1988–89 season. He also appeared in one NHL game with the New York Rangers that same season.

More was traded to the Minnesota North Stars early in the 1989–90 season in exchange for Dave Archibald. He spent one year with the North Stars organization before being traded to the Montreal Canadiens for goaltender Brian Hayward. More never appeared in a game with the Canadiens, spending the season with the AHL's Fredericton Canadiens, before being exposed in the 1991 NHL Expansion Draft and selected 2nd by the San Jose Sharks.

After five seasons with the Sharks, More was traded back to the New York Rangers before the 1996–97 season in a trade which brought Marty McSorley to San Jose. More only played 14 games in his second stint with the Rangers, however, before being sent to the Phoenix Coyotes. During the 1997–98 season, the Coyotes traded him to the Chicago Blackhawks along with Chad Kilger in exchange for Keith Carney and Jim Cummins.

At 28 More suffered a career-ending injury with the Nashville Predators in the 1998–99 season. In his NHL career, he appeared in 406 games. He scored 18 goals and added 54 assists. He also played in 31 Stanley Cup playoff games, recording six assists. In 2011, More was inducted into the Manitoba Hockey Hall of Fame for his contributions as a player and coach.

== Career statistics ==
			Regular season					Playoffs
Season	Team	League	GP	G	A	Pts	PIM	GP	G	A	Pts	PIM
1984–85	Lethbridge Broncos	WHL	71	3	9	12	101	4	1	0	1	7
1985–86	Lethbridge Broncos	WHL	61	7	18	25	155	9	0	2	2	36
1986–87	Brandon Wheat Kings	WHL	21	4	6	10	62	—	—	—	—	—
1986–87	New Westminster Bruins	WHL	43	4	23	27	155	—	—	—	—	—
1987–88	New Westminster Bruins	WHL	70	13	47	60	270	5	0	2	2	26
1988–89	New York Rangers	NHL	1	0	0	0	0	—	—	—	—	—
1988–89	Denver Rangers	IHL	62	7	15	22	138	3	0	1	1	26
1989–90	Flint Spirits	IHL	9	1	5	6	41	—	—	—	—	—
1989–90	Minnesota North Stars	NHL	5	0	0	0	16	—	—	—	—	—
1989–90	Kalamazoo Wings	IHL	64	9	25	34	316	10	0	3	3	13
1990–91	Kalamazoo Wings	IHL	10	0	5	5	46	—	—	—	—	—
1990–91	Fredericton Canadiens	AHL	57	7	17	24	152	9	1	1	2	34
1991–92	San Jose Sharks	NHL	46	4	13	17	85	—	—	—	—	—
1991–92	Kansas City Blades	IHL	2	0	2	2	4	—	—	—	—	—
1992–93	San Jose Sharks	NHL	73	5	6	11	179	—	—	—	—	—
1993–94	San Jose Sharks	NHL	49	1	6	7	63	13	0	2	2	22
1993–94	Kansas City Blades	IHL	2	1	0	1	25	—	—	—	—	—
1994–95	San Jose Sharks	NHL	45	0	6	6	71	11	0	4	4	6
1995–96	San Jose Sharks	NHL	74	2	7	9	147	—	—	—	—	—
1996–97	New York Rangers	NHL	14	0	1	1	25	—	—	—	—	—
1996–97	Phoenix Coyotes	NHL	23	1	6	7	37	7	0	0	0	7
1997–98	Phoenix Coyotes	NHL	41	5	5	10	53	—	—	—	—	—
1997–98	Chicago Blackhawks	NHL	17	0	2	2	8	—	—	—	—	—
1998–99	Nashville Predators	NHL	18	0	2	2	18	—	—	—	—	—
NHL totals			406	18	54	72	702	31	0	6	6	45

== Awards ==
- WHL West First All-Star Team – 1988

Preceded by Brian Leetch	New York Rangers first-round draft pick 1987	Succeeded by Steven Rice
