= Igor Nikulin (ice hockey) =

Russian ice hockey player (born 1972)

- Born: August 26, 1972 (age 52); Cherepovets, Soviet Union
- Height: 6 ft 1 in (185 cm)
- Weight: 180 lb (82 kg; 12 st 12 lb)
- Position: Right wing
- Shot: Left
- Played for: Mighty Ducks of Anaheim
- NHL draft: 107th overall, 1995; Mighty Ducks of Anaheim
- Playing career: 1992–2004

Igor Nikulin (born August 26, 1972) is a Russian former professional ice hockey right winger who played in one National Hockey League game for the Mighty Ducks of Anaheim during the 1997 Stanley Cup playoffs. The rest of his career, which lasted from 1992 to 2004, was split between Russia and the North American minor leagues.

== Career statistics ==
			Regular season					Playoffs
Season	Team	League	GP	G	A	Pts	PIM	GP	G	A	Pts	PIM
1989–90	Metallurg Cherepovets	URS-2	14	0	0	0	0	—	—	—	—	—
1990–91	SKA–2 Leningrad	URS-3	43	8	5	13	26	—	—	—	—	—
1991–92	SKA Saint Petersburg	CIS-2	1	0	0	0	0	—	—	—	—	—
1991–92	SKA–2 Saint Petersburg	CIS-3	41	25	11	36	16	—	—	—	—	—
1991–92	Metallurg Cherepovets	CIS-2	8	0	0	0	0	—	—	—	—	—
1992–93	Metallurg Cherepovets	RUS	42	11	11	22	22	—	—	—	—	—
1992–93	Metallurg–2 Cherepovets	RUS-2	1	2	0	2	0	—	—	—	—	—
1993–94	Metallurg Cherepovets	RUS	44	14	13	27	52	2	1	0	1	0
1993–94	Metallurg–2 Cherepovets	RUS-2	1	0	1	1	0	—	—	—	—	—
1994–95	Severstal Cherepovets	RUS	52	14	12	26	28	—	—	—	—	—
1994–95	Severstal–2 Cherepovets	RUS-2	2	4	1	5	2	—	—	—	—	—
1995–96	Severstal Cherepovets	RUS	47	20	13	33	28	4	1	0	1	0
1995–96	Baltimore Bandits	AHL	4	2	2	4	2	—	—	—	—	—
1996–97	Baltimore Bandits	AHL	61	27	25	52	14	3	2	1	3	2
1996–97	Fort Wayne Komets	IHL	10	1	2	3	4	—	—	—	—	—
1996–97	Mighty Ducks of Anaheim	NHL	—	—	—	—	—	1	0	0	0	0
1997–98	Cincinnati Mighty Ducks	AHL	54	14	11	25	40	—	—	—	—	—
1998–99	Cincinnati Mighty Ducks	AHL	74	18	26	44	26	3	0	1	1	4
1999–2000	Ak Bars Kazan	RSL	4	0	0	0	4	—	—	—	—	—
1999–2000	Severstal Cherepovets	RSL	24	8	6	14	8	8	3	3	6	2
1999–2000	Severstal–2 Cherepovets	RUS-3	3	4	1	5	0	—	—	—	—	—
2000–01	Severstal Cherepovets	RSL	37	9	10	19	10	4	2	0	2	2
2000–01	Severstal–2 Cherepovets	RUS-3	1	0	0	0	1	—	—	—	—	—
2001–02	SKA Saint Petersburg	RSL	11	4	6	10	6	—	—	—	—	—
2001–02	Severstal Cherepovets	RSL	28	6	11	17	12	3	0	0	0	2
2001–02	Severstal–2 Cherepovets	RUS-3	6	4	4	8	0	—	—	—	—	—
2002–03	SKA Saint Petersburg	RSL	9	0	1	1	2	—	—	—	—	—
2002–03	SKA–2 Saint Petersburg	RUS-3	1	0	0	0	0	—	—	—	—	—
2002–03	Krylya Sovetov Moscow	RSL	6	0	0	0	2	—	—	—	—	—
2002–03	Krylya Sovetov–2 Moscow	RUS-3	1	1	1	2	0	—	—	—	—	—
2002–03	Molot Perm	RSL	10	2	1	3	4	—	—	—	—	—
2003–04	Severstal Cherepovets	RSL	7	0	1	1	0	—	—	—	—	—
2003–04	Severstal–2 Cherepovets	RUS-3	4	4	0	4	2	—	—	—	—	—
2003–04	Neftekhimik Nizhnekamsk	RSL	23	2	2	4	12	—	—	—	—	—
2003–04	Neftekhimik–2 Nizhnekamsk	RUS-3	2	0	3	3	2	—	—	—	—	—
RUS & RSL totals			344	90	87	177	190	21	7	3	10	6
AHL totals			193	61	64	125	82	6	2	2	4	6
NHL totals			—	—	—	—	—	1	0	0	0	0

== See also ==
- List of players who played only one game in the NHL
