= 1996–97 Boston Bruins season =

NHL team season

1996–97 Boston Bruins
- Division: 6th Northeast
- Conference: 13th Eastern
- 1996–97 record: 26–47–9
- Home record: 14–20–7
- Road record: 12–27–2
- Goals for: 234
- Goals against: 300

Team information
- General manager: Harry Sinden
- Coach: Steve Kasper
- Captain: Ray Bourque
- Arena: Fleet Center
- Average attendance: 15,550 (87.1%); Total: 637,575
- Minor league affiliates: Providence Bruins (AHL); Charlotte Checkers (ECHL)

Team leaders
- Goals: Ted Donato (25)
- Assists: Jozef Stumpel (55)
- Points: Jozef Stumpel (76)
- Penalty minutes: Jeff Odgers (197)
- Plus/minus: P. C. Drouin (+1)
- Wins: Bill Ranford (12)
- Goals against average: Tim Cheveldae (3.22)

The 1996–97 Boston Bruins season was the team's 73rd season of operation in the National Hockey League (NHL). The Bruins finished with the worst record in the NHL and missed the Stanley Cup playoffs for the first time since 1966–67 season.

== Regular season ==
=== Final standings ===
Northeast Division
No.	CR		GP	W	L	T	GF	GA	Pts
1	2	**Buffalo Sabres**	82	40	30	12	237	208	92
2	6	**Pittsburgh Penguins**	82	38	36	8	285	280	84
3	7	**Ottawa Senators**	82	31	36	15	226	234	77
4	8	**Montreal Canadiens**	82	31	36	15	249	276	77
5	10	Hartford Whalers	82	32	39	11	226	256	75
6	13	Boston Bruins	82	26	47	9	234	300	61

Eastern Conference
R		Div	GP	W	L	T	GF	GA	Pts
**1**	**New Jersey Devils**	**ATL**	**82**	**45**	**23**	**14**	**231**	**182**	**104**
**2**	**Buffalo Sabres**	**NE**	**82**	**40**	**30**	**12**	**237**	**208**	**92**
**3**	**Philadelphia Flyers**	**ATL**	**82**	**45**	**24**	**13**	**274**	**217**	**103**
**4**	**Florida Panthers**	**ATL**	**82**	**35**	**28**	**19**	**221**	**201**	**89**
**5**	**New York Rangers**	**ATL**	**82**	**38**	**34**	**10**	**258**	**231**	**86**
**6**	**Pittsburgh Penguins**	**NE**	**82**	**38**	**36**	**8**	**285**	**280**	**84**
**7**	**Ottawa Senators**	**NE**	**82**	**31**	**36**	**15**	**226**	**234**	**77**
**8**	**Montreal Canadiens**	**NE**	**82**	**31**	**36**	**15**	**249**	**276**	**77**
9	Washington Capitals	ATL	82	33	40	9	214	231	75
10	Hartford Whalers	NE	82	32	39	11	226	256	75
11	Tampa Bay Lightning	ATL	82	32	40	10	217	247	74
12	New York Islanders	ATL	82	29	41	12	240	250	70
13	Boston Bruins	NE	82	26	47	9	234	300	61

Divisions: ATL – Atlantic, NE – Northeast

bold – Qualified for playoffs

== Schedule and results ==
1996–97 regular season
October: 4–4–2 (home: 1–3–2; road: 3–1–0)

Game	Date	Score	Opponent	Record	Recap
1	October 5, 1996	4–4 OT	New York Rangers (1996–97)	0–0–1	T
2	October 7, 1996	2–5	Phoenix Coyotes (1996–97)	0–1–1	L
3	October 12, 1996	5–3	@ San Jose Sharks (1996–97)	1–1–1	W
4	October 14, 1996	5–4 OT	@ Vancouver Canucks (1996–97)	2–1–1	W
5	October 17, 1996	2–4	@ Los Angeles Kings (1996–97)	2–2–1	L
6	October 20, 1996	5–1	@ Mighty Ducks of Anaheim (1996–97)	3–2–1	W
7	October 24, 1996	1–2	Toronto Maple Leafs (1996–97)	3–3–1	L
8	October 26, 1996	1–2	Detroit Red Wings (1996–97)	3–4–1	L
9	October 29, 1996	5–2	New Jersey Devils (1996–97)	4–4–1	W
10	October 31, 1996	4–4 OT	Hartford Whalers (1996–97)	4–4–2	T

November: 5–6–2 (home: 4–4–1; road: 1–2–1)

Game	Date	Score	Opponent	Record	Recap
11	November 2, 1996	2–5	New York Rangers (1996–97)	4–5–2	L
12	November 4, 1996	4–4 OT	Los Angeles Kings (1996–97)	4–5–3	T
13	November 6, 1996	1–5	@ Hartford Whalers (1996–97)	4–6–3	L
14	November 7, 1996	0–6	Edmonton Oilers (1996–97)	4–7–3	L
15	November 9, 1996	4–3	@ Ottawa Senators (1996–97)	5–7–3	W
16	November 14, 1996	2–1 OT	Pittsburgh Penguins (1996–97)	6–7–3	W
17	November 18, 1996	4–2	San Jose Sharks (1996–97)	7–7–3	W
18	November 19, 1996	2–2 OT	@ Washington Capitals (1996–97)	7–7–4	T
19	November 21, 1996	2–6	Montreal Canadiens (1996–97)	7–8–4	L
20	November 23, 1996	2–3 OT	Buffalo Sabres (1996–97)	7–9–4	L
21	November 26, 1996	2–0	Philadelphia Flyers (1996–97)	8–9–4	W
22	November 29, 1996	7–3	Vancouver Canucks (1996–97)	9–9–4	W
23	November 30, 1996	2–6	@ Pittsburgh Penguins (1996–97)	9–10–4	L

December: 4–7–2 (home: 2–4–2; road: 2–3–0)

Game	Date	Score	Opponent	Record	Recap
24	December 4, 1996	4–3	@ Montreal Canadiens (1996–97)	10–10–4	W
25	December 5, 1996	2–4	Hartford Whalers (1996–97)	10–11–4	L
26	December 7, 1996	1–1 OT	Calgary Flames (1996–97)	10–11–5	T
27	December 9, 1996	2–5	Mighty Ducks of Anaheim (1996–97)	10–12–5	L
28	December 12, 1996	4–7	New Jersey Devils (1996–97)	10–13–5	L
29	December 14, 1996	0–4	Buffalo Sabres (1996–97)	10–14–5	L
30	December 15, 1996	0–6	@ Philadelphia Flyers (1996–97)	10–15–5	L
31	December 17, 1996	6–4	@ Pittsburgh Penguins (1996–97)	11–15–5	W
32	December 19, 1996	3–0	Tampa Bay Lightning (1996–97)	12–15–5	W
33	December 21, 1996	4–3	Washington Capitals (1996–97)	13–15–5	W
34	December 23, 1996	3–3 OT	Chicago Blackhawks (1996–97)	13–15–6	T
35	December 27, 1996	4–6	@ Dallas Stars (1996–97)	13–16–6	L
36	December 29, 1996	2–4	@ St. Louis Blues (1996–97)	13–17–6	L

January: 5–8–0 (home: 3–3–0; road: 2–5–0)

Game	Date	Score	Opponent	Record	Recap
37	January 1, 1997	2–3	@ Ottawa Senators (1996–97)	13–18–6	L
38	January 2, 1997	5–4 OT	@ Hartford Whalers (1996–97)	14–18–6	W
39	January 4, 1997	3–2	Dallas Stars (1996–97)	15–18–6	W
40	January 7, 1997	3–7	@ Philadelphia Flyers (1996–97)	15–19–6	L
41	January 9, 1997	5–4	Montreal Canadiens (1996–97)	16–19–6	W
42	January 11, 1997	3–6	@ Montreal Canadiens (1996–97)	16–20–6	L
43	January 13, 1997	3–4	Ottawa Senators (1996–97)	16–21–6	L
44	January 14, 1997	2–4	@ New Jersey Devils (1996–97)	16–22–6	L
45	January 20, 1997	2–3	Washington Capitals (1996–97)	16–23–6	L
46	January 22, 1997	4–1	@ Ottawa Senators (1996–97)	17–23–6	W
47	January 23, 1997	1–4	Florida Panthers (1996–97)	17–24–6	L
48	January 25, 1997	4–1	Colorado Avalanche (1996–97)	18–24–6	W
49	January 30, 1997	1–3	@ Florida Panthers (1996–97)	18–25–6	L

February: 3–8–2 (home: 1–2–1; road: 2–6–1)

Game	Date	Score	Opponent	Record	Recap
50	February 1, 1997	3–0	@ Tampa Bay Lightning (1996–97)	19–25–6	W
51	February 2, 1997	3–2	@ New York Rangers (1996–97)	20–25–6	W
52	February 4, 1997	3–4	Ottawa Senators (1996–97)	20–26–6	L
53	February 6, 1997	3–5	Hartford Whalers (1996–97)	20–27–6	L
54	February 8, 1997	3–3 OT	St. Louis Blues (1996–97)	20–27–7	T
55	February 11, 1997	1–5	@ Calgary Flames (1996–97)	20–28–7	L
56	February 12, 1997	3–4	@ Edmonton Oilers (1996–97)	20–29–7	L
57	February 15, 1997	4–5 OT	@ Phoenix Coyotes (1996–97)	20–30–7	L
58	February 18, 1997	2–3 OT	@ Colorado Avalanche (1996–97)	20–31–7	L
59	February 20, 1997	3–5	@ Chicago Blackhawks (1996–97)	20–32–7	L
60	February 23, 1997	1–5	@ Buffalo Sabres (1996–97)	20–33–7	L
61	February 24, 1997	3–3 OT	@ Washington Capitals (1996–97)	20–33–8	T
62	February 27, 1997	6–2	Tampa Bay Lightning (1996–97)	21–33–8	W

March: 3–10–1 (home: 1–3–1; road: 2–7–0)

Game	Date	Score	Opponent	Record	Recap
63	March 1, 1997	5–5 OT	Philadelphia Flyers (1996–97)	21–33–9	T
64	March 3, 1997	2–4	@ Toronto Maple Leafs (1996–97)	21–34–9	L
65	March 6, 1997	2–5	@ New York Islanders (1996–97)	21–35–9	L
66	March 8, 1997	6–4	@ Tampa Bay Lightning (1996–97)	22–35–9	W
67	March 9, 1997	3–1	@ Florida Panthers (1996–97)	23–35–9	W
68	March 12, 1997	3–6	@ Hartford Whalers (1996–97)	23–36–9	L
69	March 13, 1997	0–3	Montreal Canadiens (1996–97)	23–37–9	L
70	March 15, 1997	5–2	New York Islanders (1996–97)	24–37–9	W
71	March 17, 1997	1–5	@ Buffalo Sabres (1996–97)	24–38–9	L
72	March 19, 1997	1–4	@ Detroit Red Wings (1996–97)	24–39–9	L
73	March 22, 1997	4–5	Ottawa Senators (1996–97)	24–40–9	L
74	March 24, 1997	1–3	@ Montreal Canadiens (1996–97)	24–41–9	L
75	March 27, 1997	3–6	New York Islanders (1996–97)	24–42–9	L
76	March 29, 1997	2–8	@ New York Islanders (1996–97)	24–43–9	L

April: 2–4–0 (home: 2–1–0; road: 0–3–0)

Game	Date	Score	Opponent	Record	Recap
77	April 3, 1997	4–5	@ New York Rangers (1996–97)	24–44–9	L
78	April 5, 1997	4–2	Florida Panthers (1996–97)	25–44–9	W
79	April 8, 1997	1–3	@ Pittsburgh Penguins (1996–97)	25–45–9	L
80	April 10, 1997	1–5	Buffalo Sabres (1996–97)	25–46–9	L
81	April 11, 1997	0–2	@ New Jersey Devils (1996–97)	25–47–9	L
82	April 13, 1997	7–3	Pittsburgh Penguins (1996–97)	26–47–9	W

Legend: W Win (2 points) L Loss (0 points) T Tie (1 point)

== Player statistics ==
=== Scoring ===
- Position abbreviations: C = Center; D = Defense; G = Goaltender; LW = Left wing; RW = Right wing
- † = Joined team via a transaction (e.g., trade, waivers, signing) during the season. Stats reflect time with the Bruins only.
- ‡ = Left team via a transaction (e.g., trade, waivers, release) during the season. Stats reflect time with the Bruins only.

No.	Player	Pos	Regular season					
No.	Player	Pos	GP	G	A	Pts	+/-	PIM
16	Jozef Stumpel	C	78	21	55	76	−22	14
12	Adam Oates‡	C	63	18	52	70	−3	10
21	Ted Donato	LW	67	25	26	51	−9	37
77	Ray Bourque	D	62	19	31	50	−11	18
22	Rick Tocchet‡	RW	40	16	14	30	−3	67
19	Rob DiMaio	C	72	13	15	28	−21	82
32	Don Sweeney	D	82	3	23	26	−5	39
23	Steve Heinze	RW	30	17	8	25	−8	27
43	Jean-Yves Roy	LW	52	10	15	25	−8	22
42	Tim Sweeney	LW	36	10	11	21	0	14
33	Sheldon Kennedy	RW	56	8	10	18	−17	30
46	Barry Richter	D	50	5	13	18	−7	32
65	Brett Harkins	LW	44	4	14	18	−3	8
27	Landon Wilson†	RW	40	7	10	17	−6	49
20	Todd Elik	LW	31	4	12	16	−12	16
36	Jeff Odgers	RW	80	7	8	15	−15	197
29	Troy Mallette	LW	68	6	8	14	−8	155
18	Kyle McLaren	D	58	5	9	14	−9	54
45	Sandy Moger	RW	34	10	3	13	−12	45
11	Anson Carter†	RW	19	8	5	13	−7	2
41	Jason Allison†	C	19	3	9	12	−3	9
48	Steve Staios‡	D	54	3	8	11	−26	71
47	Mattias Timander	D	41	1	8	9	−9	14
25	Trent McCleary	C	59	3	5	8	−16	33
38	Jon Rohloff	D	37	3	5	8	−14	31
34	Bob Beers	D	27	3	4	7	0	8
37	Clayton Beddoes	C	21	1	2	3	−1	13
28	Dean Chynoweth	D	57	0	3	3	−12	171
14 (Note: Myrvold wore number 41 in his first six games.)	Anders Myrvold†	D	9	0	2	2	−1	4
49	Andre Roy	LW	10	0	2	2	−5	12
62	Evgeny Shaldybin	D	3	1	0	1	−2	0
17	Davis Payne	LW	15	0	1	1	−4	7
26	Cam Stewart	LW	15	0	1	1	−2	4
39	Scott Bailey	G	8	0	0	0		0
30	Jim Carey†	G	19	0	0	0		0
31	Tim Cheveldae	G	2	0	0	0		0
40	P. C. Drouin†	LW	3	0	0	0	1	0
52	David Emma	C	5	0	0	0	−1	0
44	Dean Malkoc	D	33	0	0	0	−14	70
30	Bill Ranford‡	G	37	0	0	0		0
48	Randy Robitaille†	C	1	0	0	0	0	0
14	Kevin Sawyer	LW	2	0	0	0	0	0
1	Paxton Schafer	G	3	0	0	0		0
35	Robbie Tallas	G	28	0	0	0		0

=== Goaltending ===
- † = Joined team via a transaction (e.g., trade, waivers, signing) during the season. Stats reflect time with the Bruins only.
- ‡ = Left team via a transaction (e.g., trade, waivers, release) during the season. Stats reflect time with the Bruins only.

No.	Player	Regular season										
No.	Player	GP	GS	W	L	T	SA	GA	GAA	SV%	SO	TOI
30	Bill Ranford‡	37	37	12	16	8	1,102	125	3.49	.887	2	2,147:09
35	Robbie Tallas	28	22	8	12	1	587	69	3.33	.882	1	1,243:53
30	Jim Carey†	19	17	5	13	0	496	64	3.82	.871	0	1,004:01
39	Scott Bailey	8	5	1	5	0	181	24	3.66	.867	0	393:46
31	Tim Cheveldae	2	1	0	1	0	33	5	3.22	.848	0	93:09
1	Paxton Schafer	3	0	0	0	0	25	6	4.65	.760	0	77:28

== Awards and records ==
=== Awards ===
Type	Award/honor	Recipient	Ref
League (in-season)	NHL All-Star Game selection	Ray Bourque (Note: Bourque was voted to the starting lineup.)	
League (in-season)	NHL All-Star Game selection	Adam Oates (Note: Oates was an injury replacement for Jaromir Jagr of the Pittsburgh Penguins.)	
Team	Elizabeth C. Dufresne Trophy	Jozef Stumpel	
Team	Seventh Player Award	Ted Donato	
Team	Three Stars Awards	Ray Bourque (1st)	
Team	Three Stars Awards	Ted Donato (2nd)	
Team	Three Stars Awards	Jozef Stumpel (3rd)	

=== Milestones ===
Milestone	Player	Date	Ref
First game	Mattias Timander	October 5, 1996	
First game	Evgeny Shaldybin	November 7, 1996	
First game	P. C. Drouin	January 25, 1997	
First game	Paxton Schafer	February 11, 1997	
First game	Randy Robitaille	March 27, 1997	

== Transactions ==
=== Trades ===
Date	Details	
June 21, 1996	To San Jose Sharks Al Iafrate	To Boston Bruins Jeff Odgers; 1996 PIT 5th-round pick (#132 overall)
June 22, 1996	To Ottawa Senators Shawn McEachern	To Boston Bruins Trent McCleary; 1996 3rd-round pick (#53 overall)
September 30, 1996	To San Jose Sharks 1997 5th-round pick (#107 overall)	To Boston Bruins Rob DiMaio
November 22, 1996	To Colorado Avalanche 1998 1st-round pick (#19 overall)	To Boston Bruins Landon Wilson; Anders Myrvold
March 1, 1997	To Washington Capitals Bill Ranford; Adam Oates; Rick Tocchet	To Boston Bruins Jason Allison; Jim Carey; Anson Carter; 1997 3rd-round pick (#63 overall); 1998 Conditional 2nd-round pick (#52 overall)

=== Free agents ===
Date	Player	Team
July 11, 1996	Dave Reid	to Dallas Stars
July 15, 1996	Jean-Yves Roy	from Ottawa Senators
July 17, 1996	Phil Von Stefenelli	to Ottawa Senators
July 19, 1996	Barry Richter	from New York Rangers
July 24, 1996	Troy Mallette	from Ottawa Senators
August 5, 1996	Bob Beers	from New York Islanders
August 7, 1996	Sheldon Kennedy	from Calgary Flames
August 27, 1996	David Emma	
August 27, 1996	Tim Cheveldae	from Philadelphia Flyers
September 4, 1996	Brett Harkins	from Florida Panthers
September 5, 1996	Joe Mullen	to Pittsburgh Penguins
October 12, 1996	Ron Sutter	to San Jose Sharks
October 14, 1996	P. C. Drouin	
December 13, 1996	Rick Zombo	to Los Angeles Kings
March 27, 1997	Randy Robitaille	

=== Signings ===
Date	Player	Contract term
June 27, 1996	Cameron Mann	3-year
January 2, 1997	Bill Ranford	3-year
April 4, 1997	Ray Bourque	2-year extension
April 23, 1997	Jonathan Aitken	3-year
May 27, 1997	P.J. Axelson	2-year
May 29, 1997	Hal Gill	

=== Waivers ===
Date	Player	Team
September 30, 1996	Dean Malkoc	from Vancouver Canucks in waiver draft
March 18, 1997	Steve Staios	to Vancouver Canucks

== Draft picks ==
Boston's draft picks at the 1996 NHL entry draft held at the Kiel Center in St. Louis, Missouri.

Round	#	Player	Position	Nationality	College/Junior/Club team (League)
1^{1}	8	Johnathan Aitken	D	Canada	Medicine Hat Tigers (WHL)
2	45	Henry Kuster	RW	Canada	Medicine Hat Tigers (WHL)
3^{2}	53	Eric Naud	LW	Canada	Saint-Hyacinthe Laser (QMJHL)
3^{3}	80	Jason Doyle	RW	Canada	Sault Ste. Marie Greyhounds (WHL)
4	100	Trent Whitfield	C	Canada	Spokane Chiefs (WHL)
5^{4}	132	Elias Abrahamsson	D	Sweden	Halifax Mooseheads (QMJHL)
6	155	Chris Lane	D	Canada	Spokane Chiefs (WHL)
7	182	Thomas Brown	D	Canada	Sarnia Sting (OHL)
8	208	Bob Prier	RW	Canada	St. Lawrence University (ECAC)
9	234	Anders Soderberg	LW	Sweden	Modo Hockey (Sweden)

Notes

1. The Bruins acquired this pick as the result of a trade on August 26, 1994 that sent Glen Wesley to Hartford in exchange for first-round picks in 1995, 1997 and this pick.
2. The Bruins acquired this pick as the result of a trade on June 22, 1996 that sent Shawn McEachern to Ottawa in exchange for Trent McCleary and this pick.
3. The Bruins acquired this pick as the result of a trade on August 17, 1995 that sent David Shaw to Tampa Bay in exchange for this pick.
  Tampa Bay previously acquired this pick as the result of a trade on August 17, 1995 that sent Marc Bergevin and Ben Hankinson to Detroit in exchange for Shawn Burr and this pick.
4. The Bruins acquired this pick as the result of a trade on June 21, 1996 that sent Al Iafrate to San Jose in exchange for Jeff Odgers and this pick.
  San Jose previously acquired this pick as the result of a trade on March 20, 1996 that sent Kevin Miller to Pittsburgh in exchange for this pick.
- The Bruins first-round pick went to the Edmonton Oilers as the result of a trade on January 11, 1996 that sent Bill Ranford to Boston in exchange for Mariusz Czerkawski, rights to Sean Brown and this pick (19th overall).
- The Bruins third-round pick went to the Pittsburgh Penguins as the result of a trade on August 1, 1995 that sent Shawn McEachern and Kevin Stevens to Boston in exchange for Glen Murray, Bryan Smolinski and this pick (72nd overall).
- The Bruins fourth-round pick went to the New York Islanders as the result of a trade on December 9, 1995 that sent Dean Chynoweth to Boston in exchange for this pick (128th overall).
