= 1996–97 Ottawa Senators season =

NHL hockey team season

1996–97 Ottawa Senators
- Division: 3rd Northeast
- Conference: 7th Eastern
- 1996–97 record: 31–36–15
- Home record: 16–17–8
- Road record: 15–19–7
- Goals for: 226
- Goals against: 234

Team information
- General manager: Pierre Gauthier
- Coach: Jacques Martin
- Captain: Randy Cunneyworth
- Alternate captains: Steve Duchesne; Alexei Yashin
- Arena: Corel Centre
- Average attendance: 15,377
- Minor league affiliates: Worcester IceCats; Raleigh IceCaps

Team leaders
- Goals: Alexei Yashin (35)
- Assists: Daniel Alfredsson (47)
- Points: Alexei Yashin (75)
- Penalty minutes: Denny Lambert (217)
- Plus/minus: Frantisek Musil (+6)
- Wins: Ron Tugnutt (17)
- Goals against average: Damian Rhodes (2.72)

The 1996–97 Ottawa Senators season was the fifth season of the Ottawa Senators of the National Hockey League (NHL). This season saw great improvement by the club, as the team finished out of last place in the National Hockey League (NHL) for the first time in team history, and went on to qualify for the 1997 Stanley Cup playoffs as the seventh seed in the Eastern Conference. In the playoffs, the Senators lost in the first round (Conference Quarterfinals) to the Buffalo Sabres. This was the first of eleven consecutive playoff appearances for the Senators.

== Regular season ==
Northeast Division teams

Ottawa got off to a slow start, with a 7–12–6 record in their first 25 games, but as the season would go on, the team got better, finishing with a .500 record in their remaining 57 games and earned 45 points in the last 41 games of the regular season. The Senators went 10–4–2 in their final 16 games of the season, including a 1–0 victory over the Buffalo Sabres in the final game of the season to earn a playoff berth.

Alexei Yashin and Daniel Alfredsson led the club offensively, while Ron Tugnutt and Damian Rhodes provided very solid goaltending for the team throughout the season.

=== Final standings ===
Northeast Division
No.	CR		GP	W	L	T	GF	GA	Pts
1	2	**Buffalo Sabres**	82	40	30	12	237	208	92
2	6	**Pittsburgh Penguins**	82	38	36	8	285	280	84
3	7	**Ottawa Senators**	82	31	36	15	226	234	77
4	8	**Montreal Canadiens**	82	31	36	15	249	276	77
5	10	Hartford Whalers	82	32	39	11	226	256	75
6	13	Boston Bruins	82	26	47	9	234	300	61

Eastern Conference
R		Div	GP	W	L	T	GF	GA	Pts
**1**	**New Jersey Devils**	**ATL**	**82**	**45**	**23**	**14**	**231**	**182**	**104**
**2**	**Buffalo Sabres**	**NE**	**82**	**40**	**30**	**12**	**237**	**208**	**92**
**3**	**Philadelphia Flyers**	**ATL**	**82**	**45**	**24**	**13**	**274**	**217**	**103**
**4**	**Florida Panthers**	**ATL**	**82**	**35**	**28**	**19**	**221**	**201**	**89**
**5**	**New York Rangers**	**ATL**	**82**	**38**	**34**	**10**	**258**	**231**	**86**
**6**	**Pittsburgh Penguins**	**NE**	**82**	**38**	**36**	**8**	**285**	**280**	**84**
**7**	**Ottawa Senators**	**NE**	**82**	**31**	**36**	**15**	**226**	**234**	**77**
**8**	**Montreal Canadiens**	**NE**	**82**	**31**	**36**	**15**	**249**	**276**	**77**
9	Washington Capitals	ATL	82	33	40	9	214	231	75
10	Hartford Whalers	NE	82	32	39	11	226	256	75
11	Tampa Bay Lightning	ATL	82	32	40	10	217	247	74
12	New York Islanders	ATL	82	29	41	12	240	250	70
13	Boston Bruins	NE	82	26	47	9	234	300	61

Divisions: ATL – Atlantic, NE – Northeast

bold – Qualified for playoffs

== Playoffs ==
The Ottawa Senators ended the 1996–97 regular season as the Eastern Conference's seventh seed. The Senators faced the Buffalo Sabres, and nearly pulled off the upset against their heavily favoured opponent, losing to the Sabres in overtime in the seventh game of the series, a game which included an own-goal by Alexei Yashin when the puck went past Tugnutt after the Sens won a faceoff in their zone.

== Schedule and results ==
=== Regular season ===
1996–97 regular season
October: 3–3–4 (home: 2–0–2; road: 1–3–2)

Game	Date	Score	Opponent	Record	Attendance	Recap
1	October 5, 1996	3–3 OT	@ Montreal Canadiens (1996–97)	0–0–1	20,639	T
2	October 9, 1996	3–3 OT	New York Islanders (1996–97)	0–0–2	15,352	T
3	October 11, 1996	3–2	Pittsburgh Penguins (1996–97)	1–0–2	12,337	W
4	October 12, 1996	2–3	@ Pittsburgh Penguins (1996–97)	1–1–2	15,472	L
5	October 18, 1996	2–2 OT	@ New Jersey Devils (1996–97)	1–1–3	14,710	T
6	October 19, 1996	6–3	Montreal Canadiens (1996–97)	2–1–3	18,201	W
7	October 23, 1996	2–5	@ Florida Panthers (1996–97)	2–2–3	14,703	L
8	October 24, 1996	5–2	@ Tampa Bay Lightning (1996–97)	3–2–3	16,286	W
9	October 26, 1996	1–5	@ Dallas Stars (1996–97)	3–3–3	15,118	L
10	October 30, 1996	2–2 OT	Los Angeles Kings (1996–97)	3–3–4	13,053	T

November: 4–7–2 (home: 2–4–2; road: 2–3–0)

Game	Date	Score	Opponent	Record	Attendance	Recap
11	November 1, 1996	2–2 OT	Detroit Red Wings (1996–97)	3–3–5	14,158	T
12	November 2, 1996	3–7	@ Pittsburgh Penguins (1996–97)	3–4–5	15,441	L
13	November 7, 1996	6–2	Toronto Maple Leafs (1996–97)	4–4–5	18,500	W
14	November 9, 1996	3–4	Boston Bruins (1996–97)	4–5–5	14,411	L
15	November 10, 1996	0–2	@ Chicago Blackhawks (1996–97)	4–6–5	17,326	L
16	November 13, 1996	0–4	Edmonton Oilers (1996–97)	4–7–5	15,312	L
17	November 15, 1996	4–3	Chicago Blackhawks (1996–97)	5–7–5	12,468	W
18	November 16, 1996	4–1	@ New York Islanders (1996–97)	6–7–5	12,288	W
19	November 19, 1996	1–2	New Jersey Devils (1996–97)	6–8–5	15,232	L
20	November 23, 1996	3–3 OT	Hartford Whalers (1996–97)	6–8–6	14,648	T
21	November 27, 1996	2–1	@ Washington Capitals (1996–97)	7–8–6	12,911	W
22	November 29, 1996	0–3	@ Buffalo Sabres (1996–97)	7–9–6	18,595	L
23	November 30, 1996	3–4	Philadelphia Flyers (1996–97)	7–10–6	14,920	L

December: 4–7–1 (home: 2–5–0; road: 2–2–1)

Game	Date	Score	Opponent	Record	Attendance	Recap
24	December 4, 1996	2–4	Pittsburgh Penguins (1996–97)	7–11–6	11,679	L
25	December 6, 1996	2–5	@ Edmonton Oilers (1996–97)	7–12–6	15,060	L
26	December 7, 1996	3–2	@ Vancouver Canucks (1996–97)	8–12–6	16,605	W
27	December 10, 1996	5–5 OT	@ Calgary Flames (1996–97)	8–12–7	16,103	T
28	December 13, 1996	2–4	Phoenix Coyotes (1996–97)	8–13–7	11,441	L
29	December 15, 1996	0–4	Dallas Stars (1996–97)	8–14–7	14,249	L
30	December 19, 1996	5–2	Florida Panthers (1996–97)	9–14–7	13,264	W
31	December 21, 1996	2–3	Buffalo Sabres (1996–97)	9–15–7	11,597	L
32	December 23, 1996	6–0	@ Montreal Canadiens (1996–97)	10–15–7	21,273	W
33	December 26, 1996	5–2	New York Rangers (1996–97)	11–15–7	18,280	W
34	December 28, 1996	2–3	@ Hartford Whalers (1996–97)	11–16–7	14,092	L
35	December 30, 1996	3–4 OT	Mighty Ducks of Anaheim (1996–97)	11–17–7	17,605	L

January: 4–6–3 (home: 3–5–2; road: 1–1–1)

Game	Date	Score	Opponent	Record	Attendance	Recap
36	January 1, 1997	3–2	Boston Bruins (1996–97)	12–17–7	15,381	W
37	January 3, 1997	0–1	New Jersey Devils (1996–97)	12–18–7	12,082	L
38	January 4, 1997	4–6	@ New York Rangers (1996–97)	12–19–7	18,200	L
39	January 6, 1997	3–4	Tampa Bay Lightning (1996–97)	12–20–7	11,329	L
40	January 9, 1997	0–2	Colorado Avalanche (1996–97)	12–21–7	17,126	L
41	January 11, 1997	3–3 OT	Pittsburgh Penguins (1996–97)	12–21–8	18,223	T
42	January 13, 1997	4–3	@ Boston Bruins (1996–97)	13–21–8	16,135	W
43	January 15, 1997	5–1	Washington Capitals (1996–97)	14–21–8	12,152	W
44	January 22, 1997	1–4	Boston Bruins (1996–97)	14–22–8	14,249	L
45	January 24, 1997	2–2 OT	Calgary Flames (1996–97)	14–22–9	13,306	T
46	January 27, 1997	5–3	Tampa Bay Lightning (1996–97)	15–22–9	13,283	W
47	January 29, 1997	1–1 OT	@ New Jersey Devils (1996–97)	15–22–10	12,366	T
48	January 30, 1997	2–5	St. Louis Blues (1996–97)	15–23–10	11,830	L

February: 6–5–3 (home: 3–1–1; road: 3–4–2)

Game	Date	Score	Opponent	Record	Attendance	Recap
49	February 1, 1997	2–1	@ Toronto Maple Leafs (1996–97)	16–23–10	15,726	W
50	February 3, 1997	6–4	Vancouver Canucks (1996–97)	17–23–10	14,455	W
51	February 4, 1997	4–3	@ Boston Bruins (1996–97)	18–23–10	15,550	W
52	February 8, 1997	3–3 OT	San Jose Sharks (1996–97)	18–23–11	18,500	T
53	February 9, 1997	1–2	@ Buffalo Sabres (1996–97)	18–24–11	14,841	L
54	February 11, 1997	5–5 OT	@ New York Islanders (1996–97)	18–24–12	8,380	T
55	February 13, 1997	2–4	@ Philadelphia Flyers (1996–97)	18–25–12	19,425	L
56	February 15, 1997	1–2	@ Hartford Whalers (1996–97)	18–26–12	13,767	L
57	February 16, 1997	4–2	Hartford Whalers (1996–97)	19–26–12	18,338	W
58	February 18, 1997	6–1	@ Washington Capitals (1996–97)	20–26–12	9,784	W
59	February 20, 1997	1–1 OT	@ St. Louis Blues (1996–97)	20–26–13	14,305	T
60	February 23, 1997	3–4	@ Colorado Avalanche (1996–97)	20–27–13	16,061	L
61	February 26, 1997	5–8	Philadelphia Flyers (1996–97)	20–28–13	18,245	L
62	February 28, 1997	4–1	New York Islanders (1996–97)	21–28–13	17,413	W

March: 5–6–2 (home: 1–2–1; road: 4–4–1)

Game	Date	Score	Opponent	Record	Attendance	Recap
63	March 1, 1997	1–3	Buffalo Sabres (1996–97)	21–29–13	17,231	L
64	March 5, 1997	1–4	@ Mighty Ducks of Anaheim (1996–97)	21–30–13	17,174	L
65	March 6, 1997	0–2	@ San Jose Sharks (1996–97)	21–31–13	17,442	L
66	March 8, 1997	1–3	@ Los Angeles Kings (1996–97)	21–32–13	12,086	L
67	March 10, 1997	4–1	@ Phoenix Coyotes (1996–97)	22–32–13	16,210	W
68	March 14, 1997	3–4 OT	New York Rangers (1996–97)	22–33–13	18,500	L
69	March 15, 1997	2–2 OT	@ Montreal Canadiens (1996–97)	22–33–14	21,273	T
70	March 17, 1997	4–3	@ New York Rangers (1996–97)	23–33–14	18,200	W
71	March 20, 1997	2–2 OT	Florida Panthers (1996–97)	23–33–15	18,219	T
72	March 22, 1997	5–4	@ Boston Bruins (1996–97)	24–33–15	15,188	W
73	March 25, 1997	0–5	@ Tampa Bay Lightning (1996–97)	24–34–15	17,873	L
74	March 27, 1997	3–2	@ Florida Panthers (1996–97)	25–34–15	14,703	W
75	March 29, 1997	5–2	Montreal Canadiens (1996–97)	26–34–15	18,500	W

April: 5–2–0 (home: 3–0–0; road: 2–2–0)

Game	Date	Score	Opponent	Record	Attendance	Recap
76	April 2, 1997	2–0	@ Buffalo Sabres (1996–97)	27–34–15	18,595	W
77	April 3, 1997	4–0	Washington Capitals (1996–97)	28–34–15	18,500	W
78	April 5, 1997	2–5	@ Pittsburgh Penguins (1996–97)	28–35–15	17,238	L
79	April 6, 1997	1–2	@ Philadelphia Flyers (1996–97)	28–36–15	19,608	L
80	April 9, 1997	5–4	Hartford Whalers (1996–97)	29–36–15	18,500	W
81	April 11, 1997	3–2	@ Detroit Red Wings (1996–97)	30–36–15	19,983	W
82	April 12, 1997	1–0	Buffalo Sabres (1996–97)	31–36–15	18,500	W

Legend: W Win (2 points) L Loss (0 points) T Tie (1 point)

=== Playoffs ===
1997 Stanley Cup playoffs
Eastern Conference Quarterfinals vs. (2) Buffalo Sabres – Sabres win 4–3

Game	Date	Score	Opponent	Series	Attendance	Recap
1	April 17, 1997	1–3	@ Buffalo Sabres	Sabres lead 1–0	18,595	L
2	April 19, 1997	3–1	@ Buffalo Sabres	Series tied 1–1	18,595	W
3	April 21, 1997	2–3	Buffalo Sabres	Sabres lead 2–1	18,500	L
4	April 23, 1997	1–0 OT	Buffalo Sabres	Series tied 2–2	18,500	W
5	April 25, 1997	4–1	@ Buffalo Sabres	Senators lead 3–2	18,595	W
6	April 27, 1997	0–3	Buffalo Sabres	Series tied 3–3	18,500	L
7	April 29, 1997	2–3 OT	@ Buffalo Sabres	Sabres win 4–3	18,595	L

Legend: W Win L Loss

== Player statistics ==
=== Scoring ===
- Position abbreviations: C = Centre; D = Defence; G = Goaltender; LW = Left wing; RW = Right wing
- † = Joined team via a transaction (e.g., trade, waivers, signing) during the season. Stats reflect time with the Senators only.
- ‡ = Left team via a transaction (e.g., trade, waivers, release) during the season. Stats reflect time with the Senators only.

No.	Player	Pos	Regular season						Playoffs					
No.	Player	Pos	GP	G	A	Pts	+/-	PIM	GP	G	A	Pts	+/-	PIM
19	Alexei Yashin	C	82	35	40	75	−7	44	7	1	5	6	−2	2
11	Daniel Alfredsson	RW	76	24	47	71	5	30	7	5	2	7	−1	6
91	Alexandre Daigle	C	82	26	25	51	−33	33	7	0	0	0	−5	2
28	Steve Duchesne	D	78	19	28	47	−9	38	7	1	4	5	−3	0
7	Randy Cunneyworth	LW	76	12	24	36	−7	99	7	1	1	2	−3	10
10	Andreas Dackell	RW	79	12	19	31	−6	8	7	1	0	1	0	0
15	Shawn McEachern	LW	65	11	20	31	−5	18	7	2	0	2	−1	8
6	Wade Redden	D	82	6	24	30	1	41	7	1	3	4	−4	2
16	Sergei Zholtok	C	57	12	16	28	2	19	7	1	1	2	0	0
17	Tom Chorske	LW	68	18	8	26	−1	16	5	0	1	1	−1	2
22	Shaun Van Allen	C	80	11	14	25	−8	35	7	0	1	1	−3	4
25	Bruce Gardiner	RW	67	11	10	21	4	49	7	0	1	1	0	2
33	Jason York	D	75	4	17	21	−8	67	7	0	0	0	−3	4
27	Janne Laukkanen	D	76	3	18	21	−14	76	7	0	1	1	−1	6
42	Denny Lambert	LW	80	4	16	20	−4	217	6	0	1	1	0	9
76	Radek Bonk	C	53	5	13	18	−4	14	7	0	1	1	−1	4
2	Lance Pitlick	D	66	5	5	10	2	91	7	0	0	0	−1	4
38	Jason Zent	LW	22	3	3	6	5	9	—	—	—	—	—	—
23	Christer Olsson†	D	25	2	3	5	−5	10	—	—	—	—	—	—
20	Denis Chasse‡	RW	22	1	4	5	3	19	—	—	—	—	—	—
3	Frantisek Musil	D	57	0	5	5	6	58	—	—	—	—	—	—
14	Dave Hannan‡	C	34	2	2	4	−1	8	—	—	—	—	—	—
1	Damian Rhodes	G	50	0	2	2		2	—	—	—	—	—	—
44	Radim Bicanek	D	21	0	1	1	−4	8	7	0	0	0	0	8
26	Phil Crowe	LW	26	0	1	1	0	30	3	0	0	0	0	16
31	Ron Tugnutt	G	37	0	1	1		0	7	0	0	0		0
21	Dennis Vial	LW	11	0	1	1	0	25	—	—	—	—	—	—
29	Phil Von Stefenelli	D	6	0	1	1	−3	7	—	—	—	—	—	—
35	Mike Bales	G	1	0	0	0		0	—	—	—	—	—	—
4	Sean Hill	D	5	0	0	0	1	4	—	—	—	—	—	—
94	Stan Neckar	D	5	0	0	0	2	2	—	—	—	—	—	—

=== Goaltending ===
No.	Player	Regular season										Playoffs								
No.	Player	GP	W	L	T	SA	GA	GAA	SV%	SO	TOI	GP	W	L	SA	GA	GAA	SV%	SO	TOI
31	Ron Tugnutt	37	17	15	1	882	93	2.80	.895	3	1991	7	3	4	169	14	1.98	.917	1	425
1	Damian Rhodes	50	14	20	14	1213	133	2.72	.890	1	2934	—	—	—	—	—	—	—	—	—
35	Mike Bales	1	0	1	0	18	4	4.64	.778	0	52	—	—	—	—	—	—	—	—	—

== Awards and records ==
=== Awards ===
Type	Award/honour	Recipient	Ref
League (in-season)	NHL All-Star Game selection	Daniel Alfredsson	
League (in-season)	NHL Rookie of the Month	Wade Redden (April)	
Team	Molson Cup	Alexei Yashin	

=== Milestones ===
Milestone	Player	Date	Ref
First game	Andreas Dackell	October 5, 1996	
First game	Bruce Gardiner	October 5, 1996	
First game	Wade Redden	October 5, 1996	
First game	Jason Zent	December 19, 1996	

== Transactions ==
=== May 1996 ===
May 21	Traded Michel Picard to the Washington Capitals for cash considerations.

=== June 1996 ===
June 22	Acquired Shawn McEachern from the Boston Bruins for Trent McCleary and a 3rd round pick in the 1996 NHL entry draft - (Eric Naud).

=== July 1996 ===
July 1	Acquired Mike Maneluk from the Mighty Ducks of Anaheim for Kevin Brown.
July 10	Signed free agent Sergei Zholtok from the Las Vegas Thunder of the IHL to a two-year, $700,000 (CAD) contract.
July 12	Lost free agent Daniel Laperrière to the Washington Capitals on a one-year contract.
July 15	Lost free agent Jean-Yves Roy to the Boston Bruins on a one-year, $350,000 contract.
July 17	Signed free agent Phil von Stefenelli from the Boston Bruins on a one-year, $250,000 (CAD) contract.
July 24	Lost free agent Troy Mallette to the Boston Bruins on a one-year, $325,000 contract.
July 29	Signed free agent Denny Lambert from the Mighty Ducks of Anaheim to a one-year, $275,000 (CAD) contract. Signed free agent Phil Crowe from the Philadelphia Flyers to a one-year contract.

=== August 1996 ===
August 14	Signed free agent Ron Tugnutt from the Washington Capitals to a one-year, $280,000 (CAD) contract.

=== September 1996 ===
September 6	Signed free agent Denis Chassé from the Winnipeg Jets to a one-year, $275,000 (CAD) contract. Lost free agent Pat Elynuik to the Dallas Stars on a one-year, $400,000 contract.
September 13	Signed free agent Dave Hannan from the Colorado Avalanche to a one-year, $250,000 contract.

=== October 1996 ===
October 1	Acquired Jason York and Shaun Van Allen from the Mighty Ducks of Anaheim for Ted Drury and the rights to Marc Moro.
October 3	Lost free agent Scott Levins to the Phoenix Coyotes on a one-year contract.
October 10	Lost free agent Dave Archibald to the New York Islanders on a one-year, $325,000 contract.

=== November 1996 ===
November 27	Acquired Christer Olsson from the St. Louis Blues for Pavol Demitra.

=== March 1997 ===
March 18	Acquired Mike Prokopec from the Chicago Blackhawks for Denis Chassé, the rights to Kevin Bolibruck and a sixth-round pick in the 1998 NHL entry draft - (Chris Neil).

=== April 1997 ===
April 8	Re-signed Randy Cunneyworth to a two-year, $1.05 million contract extension for the 1997-98 season and a club option for the 1998-99 season.

== Draft picks ==
Ottawa's draft picks at the 1996 NHL entry draft in St. Louis, Missouri.

Round	#	Player	Nationality	College/Junior/Club team (League)
1	1	Chris Phillips	Canada	Prince Albert Raiders (WHL)
4	81	Antti-Jussi Niemi	Finland	Jokerit (SM-liiga)
6	136	Andreas Dackell	Sweden	Brynäs IF (Elitserien)
7	163	Francois Hardy	Canada	Val-d'Or Foreurs (QMJHL)
8	212	Erich Goldmann	Germany	Adler Mannheim (DEL)
9	216	Ivan Ciernik	Slovakia	MHC Plastika Nitra (Slovakia)
9	239	Sami Salo	Finland	TPS (SM-liiga)

== Farm teams ==
=== Worcester IceCats ===
Following the 1995-96 season, the Senators suspended the franchise of their American Hockey League affiliate, the Prince Edward Island Senators. Ottawa and the St. Louis Blues announced that they would share an AHL affiliate for the 1996-97 season, the Worcester IceCats. The club was coached by Greg Gilbert.

Worcester finished the season in first place in the New England Division, as the team had a record of 43–23–9–5, earning 100 points. In the post-season, the IceCats were upset by the Providence Bruins in the division semi-finals.

The top scoring Senators player was Mike Maneluk, who led the IceCats with 27 goals and was second in team scoring with 54 points. In the post-season, Jason Zent scored three goals and seven points.

=== Raleigh IceCaps ===
Following the 1995–96 season, the Senators ended their affiliation with the Thunder Bay Senators of the Colonial Hockey League. Ottawa and the New Jersey Devils announced they would share an ECHL affiliate for the 1996-97 season, the Raleigh IceCaps. The club was coached by Kurt Kleinendorst.

The IceCaps failed to qualify for the post-season, finishing in fifth place in the East Division with a 30–33–7 record, earning 67 points.

== See also ==
- 1996–97 NHL season
