= 1996–97 Toronto Maple Leafs season =

NHL hockey team season

1996–97 Toronto Maple Leafs
- Division: 6th Central
- Conference: 11th Western
- 1996–97 record: 30–44–8
- Home record: 18–20–3
- Road record: 12–24–5
- Goals for: 230
- Goals against: 273

Team information
- General manager: Cliff Fletcher
- Coach: Mike Murphy
- Captain: Doug Gilmour (Oct.–Feb.); Vacant (Feb.–Apr.)
- Arena: Maple Leaf Gardens
- Average attendance: 15,703
- Minor league affiliate: St. John's Maple Leafs

Team leaders
- Goals: Mats Sundin (41)
- Assists: Mats Sundin (53)
- Points: Mats Sundin (94)
- Penalty minutes: Tie Domi (275)
- Plus/minus: Rob Zettler (+8)
- Wins: Felix Potvin (27)
- Goals against average: Felix Potvin (3.15)

The 1996–97 Toronto Maple Leafs season was Toronto's 80th season in the National Hockey League (NHL).

The Maple Leafs entered the 1996–97 NHL season with the hopes of making the playoffs for the fifth consecutive year. Mike Murphy was hired prior to the season as the head coach replacing interim coach Nick Beverley. The team played poorly for most of the season and missed the playoffs for the first time since the 1991–92 season. This season would be Cliff Fletcher's last as general manager of the Maple Leafs. In one of his final moves, Fletcher traded captain Doug Gilmour to the New Jersey Devils in February.

== Regular season ==
=== Season standings ===
Central Division
No.	CR		GP	W	L	T	GF	GA	Pts
1	2	**Dallas Stars**	82	48	26	8	252	198	104
2	3	**Detroit Red Wings**	82	38	26	18	253	197	94
3	5	**Phoenix Coyotes**	82	38	37	7	240	243	83
4	6	**St. Louis Blues**	82	36	35	11	236	239	83
5	8	**Chicago Blackhawks**	82	34	35	13	223	210	81
6	11	Toronto Maple Leafs	82	30	44	8	230	273	68

Note: CR = Conference rank; GP = Games played; W = Wins; L = Losses; T = Ties; GF = Goals for; GA = Goals against; Pts = Points
Bolded teams qualified for the playoffs.

Western Conference
R		Div	GP	W	L	T	GF	GA	Pts
**1**	**p – Colorado Avalanche**	**PAC**	**82**	**49**	**24**	**9**	**277**	**205**	**107**
**2**	**Dallas Stars**	**CEN**	**82**	**48**	**26**	**8**	**252**	**198**	**104**
**3**	**Detroit Red Wings**	**CEN**	**82**	**38**	**26**	**18**	**253**	**197**	**94**
**4**	**Mighty Ducks of Anaheim**	**PAC**	**82**	**36**	**33**	**13**	**245**	**233**	**85**
**5**	**Phoenix Coyotes**	**CEN**	**82**	**38**	**37**	**7**	**240**	**243**	**83**
**6**	**St. Louis Blues**	**CEN**	**82**	**36**	**35**	**11**	**236**	**239**	**83**
**7**	**Edmonton Oilers**	**PAC**	**82**	**36**	**37**	**9**	**252**	**247**	**81**
**8**	**Chicago Blackhawks**	**CEN**	**82**	**34**	**35**	**13**	**223**	**210**	**81**
9	Vancouver Canucks	PAC	82	35	40	7	257	273	77
10	Calgary Flames	PAC	82	32	41	9	214	239	73
11	Toronto Maple Leafs	CEN	82	30	44	8	230	273	68
12	Los Angeles Kings	PAC	82	28	43	11	214	268	67
13	San Jose Sharks	PAC	82	27	47	8	211	278	62

Divisions: CEN – Central, PAC – Pacific

bold – Qualified for playoffs; p – Won Presidents' Trophy

== Schedule and results ==
1996–97 regular season
October: 5–6–0 (home: 3–4–0; road: 2–2–0)

Game	Date	Score	Opponent	Record	Recap
1	October 5, 1996	4–1	Mighty Ducks of Anaheim (1996–97)	1–0–0	W
2	October 8, 1996	2–4	Edmonton Oilers (1996–97)	1–1–0	L
3	October 12, 1996	4–7	Tampa Bay Lightning (1996–97)	1–2–0	L
4	October 15, 1996	1–3	Chicago Blackhawks (1996–97)	1–3–0	L
5	October 17, 1996	1–6	@ St. Louis Blues (1996–97)	1–4–0	L
6	October 19, 1996	0–2	@ Dallas Stars (1996–97)	1–5–0	L
7	October 22, 1996	4–3	San Jose Sharks (1996–97)	2–5–0	W
8	October 24, 1996	2–1	@ Boston Bruins (1996–97)	3–5–0	W
9	October 26, 1996	5–2	Phoenix Coyotes (1996–97)	4–5–0	W
10	October 29, 1996	2–5	Los Angeles Kings (1996–97)	4–6–0	L
11	October 31, 1996	5–3	@ New York Islanders (1996–97)	5–6–0	W

November: 5–9–0 (home: 5–1–0; road: 0–8–0)

Game	Date	Score	Opponent	Record	Recap
12	November 2, 1996	6–2	Detroit Red Wings (1996–97)	6–6–0	W
13	November 5, 1996	6–3	St. Louis Blues (1996–97)	7–6–0	W
14	November 7, 1996	2–6	@ Ottawa Senators (1996–97)	7–7–0	L
15	November 9, 1996	7–3	Edmonton Oilers (1996–97)	8–7–0	W
16	November 10, 1996	1–3	@ Philadelphia Flyers (1996–97)	8–8–0	L
17	November 13, 1996	2–3	@ Mighty Ducks of Anaheim (1996–97)	8–9–0	L
18	November 14, 1996	1–4	@ Los Angeles Kings (1996–97)	8–10–0	L
19	November 16, 1996	2–3	@ Phoenix Coyotes (1996–97)	8–11–0	L
20	November 19, 1996	4–3	Buffalo Sabres (1996–97)	9–11–0	W
21	November 21, 1996	3–6	@ Buffalo Sabres (1996–97)	9–12–0	L
22	November 23, 1996	3–4	Montreal Canadiens (1996–97)	9–13–0	L
23	November 26, 1996	3–2	Vancouver Canucks (1996–97)	10–13–0	W
24	November 27, 1996	2–5	@ Detroit Red Wings (1996–97)	10–14–0	L
25	November 30, 1996	2–5	@ Dallas Stars (1996–97)	10–15–0	L

December: 7–7–0 (home: 3–4–0; road: 4–3–0)

Game	Date	Score	Opponent	Record	Recap
26	December 3, 1996	2–0	St. Louis Blues (1996–97)	11–15–0	W
27	December 6, 1996	5–6	@ New York Rangers (1996–97)	11–16–0	L
28	December 7, 1996	0–4	New York Rangers (1996–97)	11–17–0	L
29	December 9, 1996	3–1	@ Chicago Blackhawks (1996–97)	12–17–0	W
30	December 10, 1996	2–5	New Jersey Devils (1996–97)	12–18–0	L
31	December 14, 1996	3–5	Phoenix Coyotes (1996–97)	12–19–0	L
32	December 15, 1996	1–3	@ Detroit Red Wings (1996–97)	12–20–0	L
33	December 17, 1996	6–3	@ San Jose Sharks (1996–97)	13–20–0	W
34	December 20, 1996	2–5	@ Phoenix Coyotes (1996–97)	13–21–0	L
35	December 21, 1996	6–2	@ Colorado Avalanche (1996–97)	14–21–0	W
36	December 23, 1996	5–6	Pittsburgh Penguins (1996–97)	14–22–0	L
37	December 27, 1996	3–2	@ St. Louis Blues (1996–97)	15–22–0	W
38	December 28, 1996	5–4	Chicago Blackhawks (1996–97)	16–22–0	W
39	December 30, 1996	2–0	New York Islanders (1996–97)	17–22–0	W

January: 2–10–1 (home: 1–5–0; road: 1–5–1)

Game	Date	Score	Opponent	Record	Recap
40	January 3, 1997	3–4	@ Edmonton Oilers (1996–97)	17–23–0	L
41	January 4, 1997	3–7	@ Vancouver Canucks (1996–97)	17–24–0	L
42	January 7, 1997	3–4 OT	@ Calgary Flames (1996–97)	17–25–0	L
43	January 11, 1997	2–3	Colorado Avalanche (1996–97)	17–26–0	L
44	January 13, 1997	3–6	@ Washington Capitals (1996–97)	17–27–0	L
45	January 15, 1997	2–3	Los Angeles Kings (1996–97)	17–28–0	L
46	January 20, 1997	1–3	@ Hartford Whalers (1996–97)	17–29–0	L
47	January 22, 1997	5–3	Calgary Flames (1996–97)	18–29–0	W
48	January 24, 1997	2–1 OT	@ Chicago Blackhawks (1996–97)	19–29–0	W
49	January 25, 1997	1–5	Dallas Stars (1996–97)	19–30–0	L
50	January 27, 1997	2–5	Colorado Avalanche (1996–97)	19–31–0	L
51	January 29, 1997	0–4	St. Louis Blues (1996–97)	19–32–0	L
52	January 31, 1997	3–3 OT	@ New Jersey Devils (1996–97)	19–32–1	T

February: 4–5–1 (home: 2–2–0; road: 2–3–1)

Game	Date	Score	Opponent	Record	Recap
53	February 1, 1997	1–2	Ottawa Senators (1996–97)	19–33–1	L
54	February 5, 1997	4–2	Mighty Ducks of Anaheim (1996–97)	20–33–1	W
55	February 8, 1997	4–2	Vancouver Canucks (1996–97)	21–33–1	W
56	February 12, 1997	2–5	@ Mighty Ducks of Anaheim (1996–97)	21–34–1	L
57	February 13, 1997	4–4 OT	@ Los Angeles Kings (1996–97)	21–34–2	T
58	February 15, 1997	0–3	@ Calgary Flames (1996–97)	21–35–2	L
59	February 18, 1997	6–5	@ Vancouver Canucks (1996–97)	22–35–2	W
60	February 19, 1997	5–6	@ Edmonton Oilers (1996–97)	22–36–2	L
61	February 22, 1997	5–1	@ Montreal Canadiens (1996–97)	23–36–2	W
62	February 26, 1997	1–3	Washington Capitals (1996–97)	23–37–2	L

March: 5–4–5 (home: 2–3–3; road: 3–1–2)

Game	Date	Score	Opponent	Record	Recap
63	March 1, 1997	3–2	San Jose Sharks (1996–97)	24–37–2	W
64	March 3, 1997	4–2	Boston Bruins (1996–97)	25–37–2	W
65	March 5, 1997	4–4 OT	Detroit Red Wings (1996–97)	25–37–3	T
66	March 8, 1997	1–1 OT	Hartford Whalers (1996–97)	25–37–4	T
67	March 10, 1997	3–3 OT	Dallas Stars (1996–97)	25–37–5	T
68	March 12, 1997	2–3	Chicago Blackhawks (1996–97)	25–38–5	L
69	March 15, 1997	3–3 OT	@ Florida Panthers (1996–97)	25–38–6	T
70	March 16, 1997	3–1	@ Tampa Bay Lightning (1996–97)	26–38–6	W
71	March 19, 1997	3–6	Philadelphia Flyers (1996–97)	26–39–6	L
72	March 20, 1997	3–6	@ Pittsburgh Penguins (1996–97)	26–40–6	L
73	March 22, 1997	0–3	Phoenix Coyotes (1996–97)	26–41–6	L
74	March 26, 1997	2–1	@ San Jose Sharks (1996–97)	27–41–6	W
75	March 27, 1997	1–1 OT	@ Phoenix Coyotes (1996–97)	27–41–7	T
76	March 29, 1997	3–2	@ Colorado Avalanche (1996–97)	28–41–7	W

April: 2–3–1 (home: 2–1–0; road: 0–2–1)

Game	Date	Score	Opponent	Record	Recap
77	April 2, 1997	3–1	Florida Panthers (1996–97)	29–41–7	W
78	April 3, 1997	2–2 OT	@ Detroit Red Wings (1996–97)	29–41–8	T
79	April 5, 1997	2–4	Detroit Red Wings (1996–97)	29–42–8	L
80	April 9, 1997	2–3	@ Dallas Stars (1996–97)	29–43–8	L
81	April 10, 1997	1–5	@ St. Louis Blues (1996–97)	29–44–8	L
82	April 12, 1997	4–1	Calgary Flames (1996–97)	30–44–8	W

Legend: W Win (2 points) L Loss (0 points) T Tie (1 point)

== Player statistics ==
=== Scoring ===
- Position abbreviations: C = Centre; D = Defence; G = Goaltender; LW = Left wing; RW = Right wing
- † = Joined team via a transaction (e.g., trade, waivers, signing) during the season. Stats reflect time with the Maple Leafs only.
- ‡ = Left team via a transaction (e.g., trade, waivers, release) during the season. Stats reflect time with the Maple Leafs only.

No.	Player	Pos	Regular season					
No.	Player	Pos	GP	G	A	Pts	+/-	PIM
13	Mats Sundin	C	82	41	53	94	6	59
93	Doug Gilmour‡	C	61	15	45	60	−5	46
17	Wendel Clark	LW	65	30	19	49	−2	75
94	Sergei Berezin	LW	73	25	16	41	−3	2
55	Larry Murphy‡	D	69	7	32	39	1	20
21	Kirk Muller‡	C	66	20	17	37	−23	85
8	Todd Warriner	LW	75	12	21	33	−3	41
28	Tie Domi	RW	80	11	17	28	−17	275
9	Mike Craig	RW	65	7	13	20	−20	62
14	Darby Hendrickson†	C	64	11	6	17	−20	47
16	Jamie Baker	C	58	8	8	16	2	28
11	Steve Sullivan†	C	21	5	11	16	5	23
4	David Ellett‡	D	56	4	10	14	−8	34
36	Dmitri Yushkevich	D	74	4	10	14	−24	56
2	Rob Zettler	D	48	2	12	14	8	51
19	Fredrik Modin	RW	76	6	7	13	−14	24
72	Mathieu Schneider	D	26	5	7	12	3	20
34	Jamie Macoun	D	73	1	10	11	−14	93
12	Brandon Convery	RW	39	2	8	10	−9	20
10	Zdenek Nedved	RW	23	3	5	8	4	6
42	David Cooper	D	19	3	3	6	−3	16
32	Nick Kypreos	LW	35	3	2	5	1	62
26	Jamie Heward	RW	20	1	4	5	−6	6
25	Jason Smith†	D	21	0	5	5	−4	16
20	Mike Johnson†	RW	13	2	2	4	−2	4
3	Matt Martin	D	36	0	4	4	−12	38
26	Craig Wolanin†	D	23	0	4	4	3	13
24	Tom Pederson†	D	15	1	2	3	0	9
7	Jason Podollan†	C	10	0	3	3	−2	6
29	Felix Potvin	G	74	0	3	3		19
43	Nathan Dempsey	LW	14	1	1	2	−2	2
7	Kelly Fairchild	C	22	0	2	2	−5	2
31	Marcel Cousineau	G	13	0	1	1		0
20	Ralph Intranuovo‡	C	3	0	1	1	−1	0
4	D. J. Smith	D	8	0	1	1	−5	7
33	Don Beaupre	G	3	0	0	0		0
39	Kelly Chase†	RW	2	0	0	0	0	27
44	John Craighead	RW	5	0	0	0	0	10
37	Mark Kolesar	RW	7	0	0	0	−3	0
22	Scott Pearson	LW	1	0	0	0	0	2
25	Greg Smyth	D	2	0	0	0	0	0
41	Shayne Toporowski	RW	3	0	0	0	0	7
38	Yannick Tremblay	D	5	0	0	0	−4	0
23	Jeff Ware	D	13	0	0	0	2	6
15	Brian Wiseman	C	5	0	0	0	0	0

=== Goaltending ===
No.	Player	Regular season									
No.	Player	GP	W	L	T	SA	GA	GAA	SV%	SO	TOI
29	Felix Potvin	74	27	36	7	2438	224	3.15	.908	0	4271
31	Marcel Cousineau	13	3	5	1	317	31	3.29	.902	1	566
33	Don Beaupre	3	0	3	0	60	10	5.46	.833	0	110

== Awards and records ==
=== Awards ===
Type	Award/honour	Recipient	Ref
League (annual)	NHL All-Rookie Team	Sergei Berezin (Forward)	
League (in-season)	NHL All-Star Game selection	Mats Sundin	
League (in-season)	NHL Rookie of the Month	Steve Sullivan (March)	
Team	Molson Cup	Felix Potvin	

=== Milestones ===
Milestone	Player	Date	Ref
First game	Sergei Berezin	October 5, 1996	
First game	Fredrik Modin	October 5, 1996	
First game	Jeff Ware	October 5, 1996	
First game	Marcel Cousineau	November 21, 1996	
First game	John Craighead	November 21, 1996	
First game	Brian Wiseman	December 14, 1996	
First game	David Cooper	December 15, 1996	
First game	Shayne Toporowski	January 7, 1997	
First game	Nathan Dempsey	January 31, 1997	
First game	Mike Johnson	March 16, 1997	
First game	D. J. Smith	March 26, 1997	
First game	Yannick Tremblay	March 27, 1997	
1,000th game played	Doug Gilmour	November 16, 1996	

== Transactions ==
The Maple Leafs have been involved in the following transactions during the 1996–97 season.

=== Trades ===
October 10, 1996	To New York Islanders 5th round pick in 1998 (Jiri Dopita)	To Toronto Maple Leafs Darby Hendrickson
January 31, 1997	To Tampa Bay Lightning 3rd round pick in 1998 (Alex Henry)	To Toronto Maple Leafs Craig Wolanin
February 25, 1997	To New Jersey Devils Doug Gilmour; Dave Ellett; 3rd round pick in 1999 (Andre Lakos)	To Toronto Maple Leafs Jason Smith; Alyn McCauley; Steve Sullivan
March 18, 1997	To Detroit Red Wings Larry Murphy	To Toronto Maple Leafs Future Considerations
March 18, 1997	To Florida Panthers Kirk Muller	To Toronto Maple Leafs Jason Podollan
March 18, 1997	To Hartford Whalers 8th round pick in 1998 (Jaroslav Svoboda)	To Toronto Maple Leafs Kelly Chase
June 12, 1997	To Florida Panthers Mike Lankshear	To Toronto Maple Leafs Per Gustafsson

=== Waivers ===
September 30, 1996	From Edmonton Oilers Ralph Intranuovo
October 25, 1996	To Edmonton Oilers Ralph Intranuovo

=== Free agents ===
Player	Former team
John Craighead	Detroit Vipers (IHL)
Scott Pearson	Buffalo Sabres
Brian Wiseman	Chicago Wolves (IHL)
Daniel Marois	Dallas Stars
Greg Smyth	Los Angeles Ice Dogs (IHL)
David Cooper	Buffalo Sabres
Tom Pederson	San Jose Sharks
Mike Johnson	Undrafted free agent

Player	New team
Paul DiPietro	Los Angeles Kings

== Draft picks ==
Toronto's picks at the 1996 NHL entry draft held at the Kiel Center in St. Louis, Missouri.

Round	#	Name	Nationality	College/Junior/Club team
2	36	Marek Posmyk	Czech Republic	Dukla Jihlava (Czech Republic)
2	50	Francis Larivee	Canada	Laval Titan (QMJHL)
3	66	Mike Lankshear	Canada	Guelph Storm (OHL)
3	68	Konstantin Kalmikov	Ukraine	Detroit Falcons (CoHL)
4	86	Jason Sessa	United States	Lake Superior State University (CCHA)
4	103	Vladimir Antipov	Russia	Torpedo Yaroslavl (Russia)
5	110	Peter Cava	Canada	Sault Ste. Marie Greyhounds (OHL)
5	111	Brandon Sugden	Canada	London Knights (OHL)
6	140	Dmytro Yakushyn	Ukraine	Pembroke Lumber Kings (COJHL)
6	148	Chris Bogas	United States	Michigan State University (CCHA)
6	151	Lucio DeMartinis	Canada	Shawinigan Cataractes (QMJHL)
7	178	Reggie Berg	United States	University of Minnesota (WCHA)
8	204	Tomas Kaberle	Czech Republic	HC Kladno (Czech Republic)
9	230	Jared Hope	Canada	Spokane Chiefs (WHL)

== Farm teams ==
The Maple Leafs farm team was the St. John's Maple Leafs, based in St. John's, Newfoundland.
