= 1996–97 Hartford Whalers season =

National Hockey League team season

1996–97 Hartford Whalers
- Division: 5th Northeast
- Conference: 10th Eastern
- 1996–97 record: 32–39–11
- Home record: 23–15–3
- Road record: 9–24–8
- Goals for: 226
- Goals against: 256

Team information
- General manager: Jim Rutherford
- Coach: Paul Maurice
- Captain: Kevin Dineen
- Alternate captains: Glen Wesley; Andrew Cassels
- Arena: Hartford Civic Center
- Average attendance: 13,680 (87.5%)
- Minor league affiliates: Springfield Falcons (AHL); Richmond Renegades (ECHL)

Team leaders
- Goals: Geoff Sanderson (36)
- Assists: Andrew Cassels (44)
- Points: Geoff Sanderson (67)
- Penalty minutes: Stu Grimson (218)
- Plus/minus: Sami Kapanen (+6)
- Wins: Sean Burke (22)
- Goals against average: Sean Burke (2.69)

The 1996–97 Hartford Whalers season was the 25th season of the franchise and the 18th and final NHL season in Hartford. The Whalers would move to Greensboro, North Carolina, the next season to become the Carolina Hurricanes.

== Off-season ==
On June 22, the Whalers participated in the 1996 NHL entry draft held at the Kiel Center in St. Louis, Missouri. Hartford did not have a selection in the first round, as the pick was traded to the Boston Bruins as part of the trade that brought Glen Wesley to the Whalers. In the second round, Hartford made their first selection of the draft, as they drafted Trevor Wasyluk from the Medicine Hat Tigers of the Western Hockey League with the 34th overall pick in the draft. Wasyluk scored 25 goals and 46 points in 69 games during the 1995–96 season. Other notable selections by the Whalers included Craig MacDonald in the fourth round, and Craig Adams in the ninth round.

The Whalers acquired Kevin Brown in a trade with the Anaheim Mighty Ducks in exchange for Espen Knutsen on October 1. Brown played in seven games with the Los Angeles Kings during the 1995–96 season, scoring one goal. Brown spent the majority of the season with the Phoenix Roadrunners of the IHL, scoring 10 goals and 26 points in 45 games. He also played in eight games with the Prince Edward Island Senators of the AHL, scoring three goals and nine points after he was traded from the Kings to the Ottawa Senators during the season.

On October 2, Hartford claimed Kent Manderville off of waivers from the Edmonton Oilers. In 37 games with the Oilers during the 1995–96 where he scored three goals and eight points.

== Regular season ==
On April 13, 1997, the Whalers played their last game in Hartford, defeating the Tampa Bay Lightning 2–1. Team captain Kevin Dineen scored the final goal in Whaler history.

The final words from SportsChannel New England with Play by play voice John Forslund at the end of the game were as follows:

"It's over folks, it's been a great ride. The Whalers will go out, winners".

=== Final standings ===
Northeast Division
No.	CR		GP	W	L	T	GF	GA	Pts
1	2	**Buffalo Sabres**	82	40	30	12	237	208	92
2	6	**Pittsburgh Penguins**	82	38	36	8	285	280	84
3	7	**Ottawa Senators**	82	31	36	15	226	234	77
4	8	**Montreal Canadiens**	82	31	36	15	249	276	77
5	10	Hartford Whalers	82	32	39	11	226	256	75
6	13	Boston Bruins	82	26	47	9	234	300	61

Eastern Conference
R		Div	GP	W	L	T	GF	GA	Pts
**1**	**New Jersey Devils**	**ATL**	**82**	**45**	**23**	**14**	**231**	**182**	**104**
**2**	**Buffalo Sabres**	**NE**	**82**	**40**	**30**	**12**	**237**	**208**	**92**
**3**	**Philadelphia Flyers**	**ATL**	**82**	**45**	**24**	**13**	**274**	**217**	**103**
**4**	**Florida Panthers**	**ATL**	**82**	**35**	**28**	**19**	**221**	**201**	**89**
**5**	**New York Rangers**	**ATL**	**82**	**38**	**34**	**10**	**258**	**231**	**86**
**6**	**Pittsburgh Penguins**	**NE**	**82**	**38**	**36**	**8**	**285**	**280**	**84**
**7**	**Ottawa Senators**	**NE**	**82**	**31**	**36**	**15**	**226**	**234**	**77**
**8**	**Montreal Canadiens**	**NE**	**82**	**31**	**36**	**15**	**249**	**276**	**77**
9	Washington Capitals	ATL	82	33	40	9	214	231	75
10	Hartford Whalers	NE	82	32	39	11	226	256	75
11	Tampa Bay Lightning	ATL	82	32	40	10	217	247	74
12	New York Islanders	ATL	82	29	41	12	240	250	70
13	Boston Bruins	NE	82	26	47	9	234	300	61

Divisions: ATL – Atlantic, NE – Northeast

bold – Qualified for playoffs

== Schedule and results ==
1996–97 regular season
October: 5–2–2 (home: 4–0–1; road: 1–2–1)

Game	Date	Score	Opponent	Record	Attendance	Recap
1	October 5, 1996	1–0	Phoenix Coyotes (1996–97)	1–0–0	15,635	W
2	October 8, 1996	7–3	Pittsburgh Penguins (1996–97)	2–0–0	11,240	W
3	October 12, 1996	0–6	@ Florida Panthers (1996–97)	2–1–0	14,703	L
4	October 17, 1996	3–1	@ New York Islanders (1996–97)	3–1–0	8,019	W
5	October 19, 1996	6–2	New Jersey Devils (1996–97)	4–1–0	14,476	W
6	October 24, 1996	4–1	Mighty Ducks of Anaheim (1996–97)	5–1–0	12,328	W
7	October 26, 1996	3–6	@ Buffalo Sabres (1996–97)	5–2–0	16,193	L
8	October 30, 1996	2–2 OT	New York Islanders (1996–97)	5–2–1	11,936	T
9	October 31, 1996	4–4 OT	@ Boston Bruins (1996–97)	5–2–2	13,284	T

November: 6–5–3 (home: 3–4–0; road: 3–1–3)

Game	Date	Score	Opponent	Record	Attendance	Recap
10	November 2, 1996	2–3	Los Angeles Kings (1996–97)	5–3–2	13,425	L
11	November 4, 1996	1–5	@ Detroit Red Wings (1996–97)	5–4–2	19,983	L
12	November 6, 1996	5–1	Boston Bruins (1996–97)	6–4–2	13,026	W
13	November 8, 1996	1–4	Detroit Red Wings (1996–97)	6–5–2	14,460	L
14	November 9, 1996	4–3 OT	Buffalo Sabres (1996–97)	7–5–2	13,352	W
15	November 12, 1996	4–3	@ San Jose Sharks (1996–97)	8–5–2	17,742	W
16	November 14, 1996	2–1	@ Phoenix Coyotes (1996–97)	9–5–2	14,968	W
17	November 16, 1996	4–4 OT	@ Colorado Avalanche (1996–97)	9–5–3	16,061	T
18	November 20, 1996	3–1	Montreal Canadiens (1996–97)	10–5–3	13,033	W
19	November 22, 1996	1–7	Pittsburgh Penguins (1996–97)	10–6–3	14,572	L
20	November 23, 1996	3–3 OT	@ Ottawa Senators (1996–97)	10–6–4	14,648	T
21	November 27, 1996	2–6	Vancouver Canucks (1996–97)	10–7–4	14,289	L
22	November 29, 1996	1–1 OT	@ Florida Panthers (1996–97)	10–7–5	14,703	T
23	November 30, 1996	6–3	@ Tampa Bay Lightning (1996–97)	11–7–5	16,375	W

December: 6–6–1 (home: 5–2–0; road: 1–4–1)

Game	Date	Score	Opponent	Record	Attendance	Recap
24	December 3, 1996	4–4 OT	@ Pittsburgh Penguins (1996–97)	11–7–6	13,816	T
25	December 5, 1996	4–2	@ Boston Bruins (1996–97)	12–7–6	14,955	W
26	December 7, 1996	6–4	Buffalo Sabres (1996–97)	13–7–6	13,464	W
27	December 11, 1996	5–2	Florida Panthers (1996–97)	14–7–6	11,884	W
28	December 12, 1996	2–3	@ Philadelphia Flyers (1996–97)	14–8–6	19,124	L
29	December 14, 1996	0–4	Philadelphia Flyers (1996–97)	14–9–6	14,590	L
30	December 16, 1996	2–5	@ New York Rangers (1996–97)	14–10–6	18,200	L
31	December 17, 1996	5–3	St. Louis Blues (1996–97)	15–10–6	12,922	W
32	December 20, 1996	1–4	Dallas Stars (1996–97)	15–11–6	12,945	L
33	December 21, 1996	6–5 OT	Tampa Bay Lightning (1996–97)	16–11–6	12,082	W
34	December 26, 1996	1–5	@ Buffalo Sabres (1996–97)	16–12–6	18,595	L
35	December 28, 1996	3–2	Ottawa Senators (1996–97)	17–12–6	14,092	W
36	December 29, 1996	3–4	@ Chicago Blackhawks (1996–97)	17–13–6	20,502	L

January: 3–10–1 (home: 2–3–1; road: 1–7–0)

Game	Date	Score	Opponent	Record	Attendance	Recap
37	January 1, 1997	2–3 OT	@ Washington Capitals (1996–97)	17–14–6	12,608	L
38	January 2, 1997	4–5 OT	Boston Bruins (1996–97)	17–15–6	14,403	L
39	January 4, 1997	1–1 OT	Washington Capitals (1996–97)	17–15–7	14,613	T
40	January 6, 1997	4–5	@ Montreal Canadiens (1996–97)	17–16–7	20,292	L
41	January 9, 1997	2–3	@ Calgary Flames (1996–97)	17–17–7	17,121	L
42	January 10, 1997	3–5	@ Vancouver Canucks (1996–97)	17–18–7	17,378	L
43	January 12, 1997	1–2 OT	@ Edmonton Oilers (1996–97)	17–19–7	14,301	L
44	January 15, 1997	0–3	Pittsburgh Penguins (1996–97)	17–20–7	14,502	L
45	January 20, 1997	3–1	Toronto Maple Leafs (1996–97)	18–20–7	13,002	W
46	January 22, 1997	2–1 OT	Florida Panthers (1996–97)	19–20–7	12,627	W
47	January 24, 1997	2–5	New York Islanders (1996–97)	19–21–7	14,619	L
48	January 25, 1997	5–1	@ Buffalo Sabres (1996–97)	20–21–7	18,595	W
49	January 30, 1997	3–5	@ Los Angeles Kings (1996–97)	20–22–7	11,036	L
50	January 31, 1997	3–6	@ Mighty Ducks of Anaheim (1996–97)	20–23–7	17,174	L

February: 4–6–2 (home: 3–2–1; road: 1–4–1)

Game	Date	Score	Opponent	Record	Attendance	Recap
51	February 5, 1997	2–5	@ New York Rangers (1996–97)	20–24–7	18,200	L
52	February 6, 1997	5–3	@ Boston Bruins (1996–97)	21–24–7	15,213	W
53	February 8, 1997	2–3 OT	@ Montreal Canadiens (1996–97)	21–25–7	21,273	L
54	February 12, 1997	2–3	New Jersey Devils (1996–97)	21–26–7	12,710	L
55	February 13, 1997	0–4	@ New Jersey Devils (1996–97)	21–27–7	14,138	L
56	February 15, 1997	2–1	Ottawa Senators (1996–97)	22–27–7	13,767	W
57	February 16, 1997	2–4	@ Ottawa Senators (1996–97)	22–28–7	18,338	L
58	February 19, 1997	2–2 OT	@ Philadelphia Flyers (1996–97)	22–28–8	19,484	T
59	February 21, 1997	7–2	New York Rangers (1996–97)	23–28–8	14,660	W
60	February 22, 1997	2–0	Washington Capitals (1996–97)	24–28–8	14,311	W
61	February 26, 1997	2–2 OT	Chicago Blackhawks (1996–97)	24–28–9	13,121	T
62	February 28, 1997	2–3	San Jose Sharks (1996–97)	24–29–9	13,547	L

March: 5–7–1 (home: 4–3–0; road: 1–4–1)

Game	Date	Score	Opponent	Record	Attendance	Recap
63	March 2, 1997	2–5	Philadelphia Flyers (1996–97)	24–30–9	14,660	L
64	March 5, 1997	2–0	Calgary Flames (1996–97)	25–30–9	12,140	W
65	March 7, 1997	2–0	Montreal Canadiens (1996–97)	26–30–9	14,341	W
66	March 8, 1997	1–1 OT	@ Toronto Maple Leafs (1996–97)	26–30–10	15,726	T
67	March 12, 1997	6–3	Boston Bruins (1996–97)	27–30–10	13,155	W
68	March 13, 1997	0–6	@ New Jersey Devils (1996–97)	27–31–10	16,244	L
69	March 15, 1997	2–4	Edmonton Oilers (1996–97)	27–32–10	14,437	L
70	March 16, 1997	3–5	@ Washington Capitals (1996–97)	27–33–10	18,130	L
71	March 20, 1997	1–4	@ St. Louis Blues (1996–97)	27–34–10	17,959	L
72	March 21, 1997	0–2	@ Dallas Stars (1996–97)	27–35–10	16,522	L
73	March 25, 1997	0–4	Colorado Avalanche (1996–97)	27–36–10	14,191	L
74	March 27, 1997	5–2	@ Tampa Bay Lightning (1996–97)	28–36–10	19,984	W
75	March 29, 1997	2–1	New York Rangers (1996–97)	29–36–10	14,660	W

April: 3–3–1 (home: 2–1–0; road: 1–2–1)

Game	Date	Score	Opponent	Record	Attendance	Recap
76	April 2, 1997	1–4	Montreal Canadiens (1996–97)	29–37–10	14,177	L
77	April 3, 1997	5–5 OT	@ Pittsburgh Penguins (1996–97)	29–37–11	17,284	T
78	April 5, 1997	4–1	@ Montreal Canadiens (1996–97)	30–37–11	21,273	W
79	April 7, 1997	4–2	Buffalo Sabres (1996–97)	31–37–11	14,660	W
80	April 9, 1997	4–5	@ Ottawa Senators (1996–97)	31–38–11	18,500	L
81	April 11, 1997	4–6	@ New York Islanders (1996–97)	31–39–11	15,382	L
82	April 13, 1997	2–1	Tampa Bay Lightning (1996–97)	32–39–11	14,660	W

Legend: W Win (2 points) L Loss (0 points) T Tie (1 point)

== Player statistics ==
=== Scoring ===
- Position abbreviations: C = Center; D = Defense; G = Goaltender; LW = Left wing; RW = Right wing
- † = Joined team via a transaction (e.g., trade, waivers, signing) during the season. Stats reflect time with the Whalers only.
- ‡ = Left team via a transaction (e.g., trade, waivers, release) during the season. Stats reflect time with the Whalers only.

No.	Player	Pos	Regular season					
No.	Player	Pos	GP	G	A	Pts	+/-	PIM
8	Geoff Sanderson	LW	82	36	31	67	−9	29
21	Andrew Cassels	C	81	22	44	66	−16	46
55	Keith Primeau†	C	75	26	25	51	−3	161
11	Kevin Dineen	RW	78	19	29	48	−6	141
16	Nelson Emerson	RW	66	9	29	38	−21	34
12	Steven Rice	RW	78	21	14	35	−11	59
20	Glen Wesley	D	68	6	26	32	0	40
92	Jeff O'Neill	RW	72	14	16	30	−24	40
24	Sami Kapanen	RW	45	13	12	25	6	2
18	Robert Kron	LW	68	10	12	22	−18	10
28	Paul Ranheim	LW	67	10	11	21	−13	18
7	Curtis Leschyshyn†	D	64	4	13	17	−19	30
3	Steve Chiasson†	D	18	3	11	14	−10	7
6	Adam Burt	D	71	2	11	13	−13	79
44	Kent Manderville	C	44	6	5	11	3	18
4	Gerald Diduck‡	D	56	1	10	11	−9	40
77	Paul Coffey†‡	D	20	3	5	8	0	18
14	Kevin Haller†	D	35	2	6	8	−11	48
36	Glen Featherstone‡	D	41	2	5	7	0	87
10	Andrei Nikolishin‡	C	12	2	5	7	−2	2
5	Alexander Godynyuk	D	55	1	6	7	−10	41
27	Derek King†	LW	12	3	3	6	0	2
22	Mark Janssens‡	C	54	2	4	6	−10	90
23	Marek Malik	D	47	1	5	6	5	50
32	Stu Grimson†	LW	75	2	2	4	−7	218
46	Kevin Brown	RW	11	0	4	4	−6	6
17	Hnat Domenichelli‡	LW	13	2	1	3	−4	7
39	Kelly Chase‡	RW	28	1	2	3	2	122
17	Chris Murray†	RW	8	1	1	2	1	10
1	Sean Burke	G	51	0	2	2		14
37	Jeff Daniels	LW	10	0	2	2	2	0
41	Nolan Pratt	D	9	0	2	2	0	6
7	Brian Glynn	D	1	1	0	1	2	2
94	Brendan Shanahan‡	LW	2	1	0	1	1	0
26	Steve Martins	C	2	0	1	1	0	0
29	Jason Muzzatti	G	31	0	1	1		18
27	Jeff Brown	D	1	0	0	0	0	0
47	Jean-Sebastien Giguere	G	8	0	0	0		0
25	Jason McBain	D	6	0	0	0	−4	0

=== Goaltending ===
No.	Player	Regular season									
No.	Player	GP	W	L	T	SA	GA	GAA	SV%	SO	TOI
1	Sean Burke	51	22	22	6	1560	134	2.69	.914	4	2985
29	Jason Muzzatti	31	9	13	5	815	91	3.43	.888	0	1591
47	Jean-Sebastien Giguere	8	1	4	0	201	24	3.65	.881	0	394

== Awards and records ==
=== Awards ===
Type	Award/honor	Recipient	Ref
League (in-season)	NHL All-Star Game selection	Geoff Sanderson	
Team	Award of Excellence	Kevin Dineen	
Team	Booster Club MVP Award	Sean Burke	
Team	Frank Keys Memorial Award	Kent Manderville	
Team	Mark Kravitz Award	Sean Burke	
Team	Most Valuable Defenseman	Glen Wesley	
Team	Three Star Award of Excellence	Sean Burke	
Team	Top Gun Award	Geoff Sanderson	
Team	True Grit Award	Kevin Dineen	

=== Milestones ===
Milestone	Player	Date	Ref
First game	Hnat Domenichelli	October 5, 1996	
First game	Nolan Pratt	October 5, 1996	
First game	Jean-Sebastien Giguere	December 12, 1996	

== Transactions ==
The Whalers were involved in the following transactions during the 1996–97 season.

=== Trades ===
October 1, 1996	To Anaheim Mighty Ducks Espen Knutsen	To Hartford Whalers Kevin Brown
October 9, 1996	To Detroit Red Wings Brendan Shanahan; Brian Glynn	To Hartford Whalers Paul Coffey; Keith Primeau; 1st round pick in 1997 - Nikos Tselios
November 9, 1996	To Washington Capitals Andrei Nikolishin	To Hartford Whalers Curtis Leschyshyn
December 15, 1996	To Philadelphia Flyers Paul Coffey; 3rd round pick in 1997 - Kris Mallette	To Hartford Whalers Kevin Haller; 1st round pick in 1997 - Scott Hannan; 7th round pick in 1997 - Andrew Merrick
March 5, 1997	To Calgary Flames Hnat Domenichelli; Glen Featherstone; 2nd round pick in 1997 - Dmitri Kokorev; 3rd round pick in 1998 - Paul Manning	To Hartford Whalers Steve Chiasson; 3rd round pick in 1997 - Francis Lessard
March 18, 1997	To Toronto Maple Leafs Kelly Chase	To Hartford Whalers 8th round pick in 1998 - Jaroslav Svoboda
March 18, 1997	To Anaheim Mighty Ducks Mark Janssens	To Hartford Whalers Bates Battaglia; 4th round pick in 1998 - Josef Vasicek
March 18, 1997	To New York Islanders 5th round pick in 1997 - Adam Edinger	To Hartford Whalers Derek King
March 18, 1997	To Phoenix Coyotes Gerald Diduck	To Hartford Whalers Chris Murray

=== Waivers ===
October 2, 1996	From Edmonton Oilers Kent Manderville
October 12, 1996	From Detroit Red Wings Stu Grimson

=== Free agents ===
Player	New Team
Scott Daniels	Philadelphia Flyers
Brad McCrimmon	Phoenix Coyotes
David Williams	Boston Bruins
Kevin Smyth	Orlando Solar Bears (IHL)
John Stevens	Philadelphia Flyers

== Draft picks ==
Hartford's picks at the 1996 NHL entry draft held at the Kiel Center in St. Louis, Missouri.

Round	#	Player	Position	Nationality	College/Junior/Club team (League)
2	34	Trevor Wasyluk	Left wing	Canada	Medicine Hat Tigers (WHL)
3	61	Andrei Petrunin	Right wing	Russia	CSKA Moscow (Russia)
4	88	Craig MacDonald	Center	Canada	Harvard University (ECAC)
4	104	Steve Wasylko	Center	Canada	Detroit Whalers (OHL)
5	116	Mark McMahon	Defense	Canada	Kitchener Rangers (OHL)
6	143	Aaron Baker	Goaltender	Canada	Tri-City Americans (WHL)
7	171	Greg Kuznik	Defense	Canada	Seattle Thunderbirds (WHL)
8	197	Kevin Marsh	Left wing	Canada	Calgary Hitmen (WHL)
9	223	Craig Adams	Right wing	Canada	Harvard University (ECAC)
9	231	Askhat Rakhmatullin	Left wing	Russia	Salavat Yulaev Ufa (Russia)

== Departure from Hartford ==
In 1994, Compuware founder Peter Karmanos purchased the Whalers. Karmanos pledged to keep the Whalers in Hartford for four years. Frustrated with lackluster attendance and corporate support, he announced in 1996 that if the Whalers were unable to sell at least 11,000 season tickets for the 1996–97 season, he would likely move the team. Furthermore, ownership only made season tickets available in full-season (41-game) packages, eliminating the popular five- and ten-game "mini plans," in a strategy largely designed to spur purchases from wealthier corporations and individuals. Sales were underwhelming at the beginning of the campaign, and at the end of the 1995–96 season it was still unknown whether the Whalers would stay in Connecticut or move. However, thanks to an aggressive marketing campaign, and the creative efforts of many fans (who pooled together resources to purchase some of the full-season packages collectively) the Whalers announced that they would stay in Connecticut for the 1996–97 season.

In early 1996, negotiations between the Whalers and Connecticut Governor John G. Rowland to build a new $147.5 million arena seemed to be going well. However, negotiations fell apart when Rowland and the State refused Karmanos' demand to reimburse the Whalers for up to $45 million in losses during the three years the new arena was to be built. As a result, the team announced on March 26, 1997, that they would leave Hartford, one of the few times that a team announced it would leave its current city without having already selected a new city. Many suspected that Governor John G. Rowland did not want to keep the Whalers, as he harbored hopes of instead landing an NFL franchise. Ideally, Rowland wanted to use the state's resources to build a new stadium to lure the New England Patriots to Connecticut and did not have serious intentions of building an NHL arena for the Whalers.
