= Evgeny Shaldybin =

Russian ice hockey player

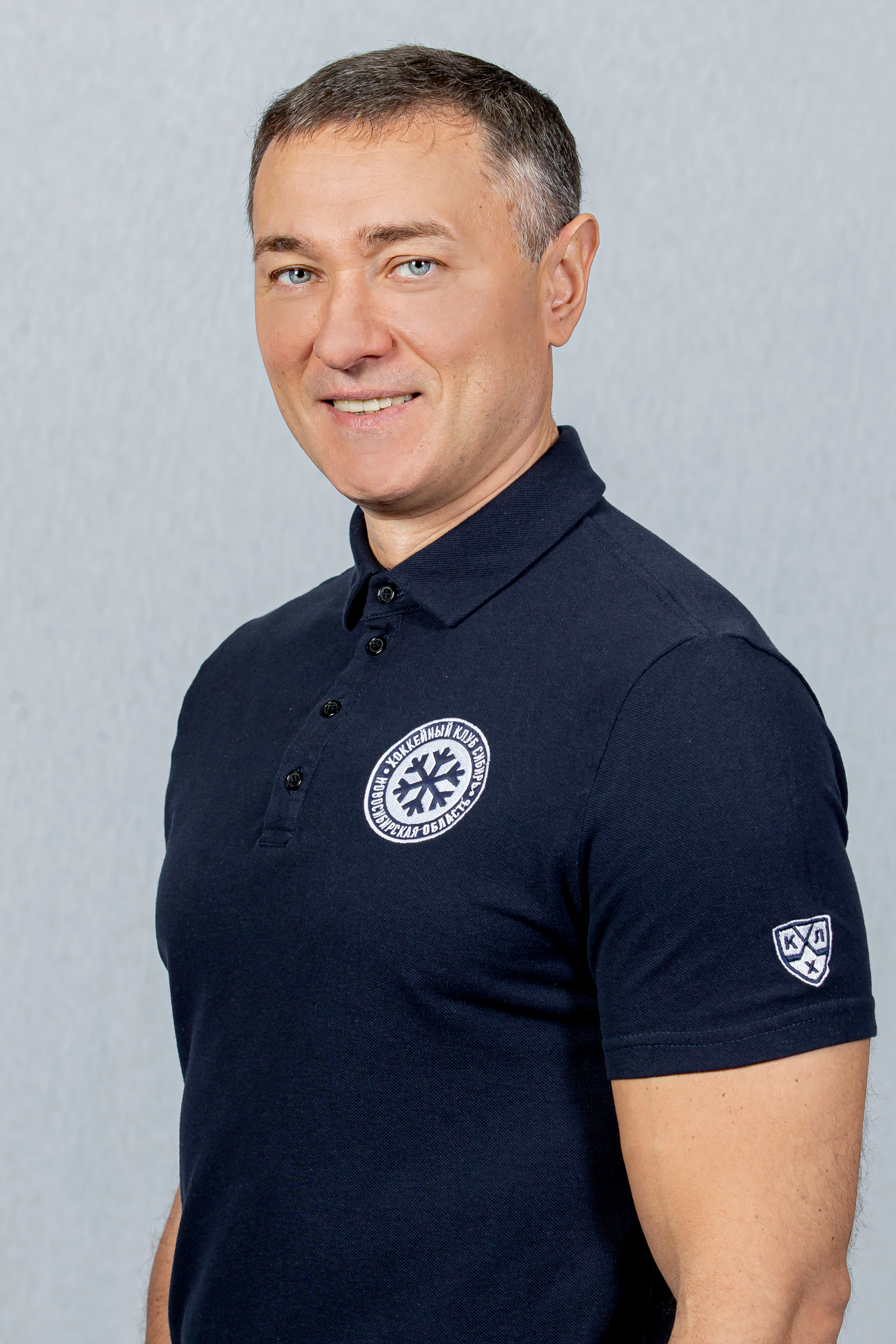
- Shaldybin in 2022
- Born: 29 July 1975 (age 49); Novosibirsk, Soviet Union
- Height: 6 ft 2 in (188 cm)
- Weight: 205 lb (93 kg; 14 st 9 lb)
- Position: Defence
- Shot: Left
- Played for: Yugra Khanty-Mansiysk; Torpedo Nizhny Novgorod; HC MVD; Spartak Moscow; Sibir Novosibirsk; Metallurg Novokuznetsk; Severstal Cherepovets; Boston Bruins; Torpedo Yaroslavl
- NHL draft: 151st overall, 1995; Boston Bruins
- Playing career: 1991–2014

Yevgeni Sergeevich Shaldybin (Russian: Евгений Сергеевич Шалдыбин; born 29 July 1975) is a Russian former professional ice hockey player who played three games in the National Hockey League for the Boston Bruins during the 1995–96 season. The rest of his career, which lasted from 1991 to 2014, was mainly spent in Russia, where he played in both the Russian Superleague, the Kontinental Hockey League, and the second-tier Supreme Hockey League.

Shaldybin scored one goal in his NHL career. It occurred on November 9, 1996 in Boston's 4-3 over the Ottawa Senators.

== Career statistics ==
=== Regular season and playoffs ===
			Regular season					Playoffs
Season	Team	League	GP	G	A	Pts	PIM	GP	G	A	Pts	PIM
1991–92	Sibir Novosibirsk	CIS-2	7	1	0	1	0	—	—	—	—	—
1992–93	Sibir Novosibirsk	RUS-2	2	0	0	0	2	—	—	—	—	—
1992–93	Yarinterkom Yaroslavl	RUS-2	3	0	0	0	2	—	—	—	—	—
1993–94	Torpedo Yaroslavl	RUS	14	0	0	0	0	—	—	—	—	—
1993–94	Torpedo–2 Yaroslavl	RUS-2	34	2	1	3	12	—	—	—	—	—
1994–95	Torpedo Yaroslavl	RUS	42	4	5	9	10	4	0	1	1	0
1994–95	Torpedo–2 Yaroslavl	RUS-2	19	1	2	3	18	—	—	—	—	—
1995–96	Torpedo Yaroslavl	RUS	41	0	2	2	10	3	0	1	1	2
1995–96	Torpedo–2 Yaroslavl	RUS-2	7	1	1	2	12	—	—	—	—	—
1996–97	Boston Bruins	NHL	3	1	0	1	0	—	—	—	—	—
1996–97	Providence Bruins	AHL	65	4	13	17	28	3	0	0	0	0
1997–98	Providence Bruins	AHL	63	5	7	12	54	—	—	—	—	—
1998–99	Providence Bruins	AHL	1	0	0	0	0	—	—	—	—	—
1998–99	Las Vegas Thunder	IHL	13	1	3	4	6	—	—	—	—	—
1998–99	B.C. Icemen	UHL	61	14	38	52	38	—	—	—	—	—
1999–2000	Torpedo Nizhny Novgorod	RSL	4	0	0	0	2	—	—	—	—	—
1999–2000	B.C. Icemen	UHL	71	16	52	68	36	6	1	4	5	8
2000–01	Spartak Moscow	RUS-2	42	9	6	15	20	14	1	5	6	16
2001–02	Spartak Moscow	RUS-2	51	3	10	13	38	—	—	—	—	—
2002–03	Severstal Cherepovets	RSL	4	0	1	1	2	—	—	—	—	—
2002–03	Severstal–2 Cherepovets	RUS-3	3	1	2	3	6	—	—	—	—	—
2002–03	Metallurg Novokuznetsk	RSL	28	1	1	2	22	—	—	—	—	—
2003–04	Sibir Novosibirsk	RSL	13	0	1	1	12	—	—	—	—	—
2003–04	Sibir–2 Novosibirsk	RUS-3	1	0	0	0	0	—	—	—	—	—
2003–04	Spartak Moscow	RUS-2	32	4	6	10	22	13	4	3	7	8
2004–05	Spartak Moscow	RSL	55	2	4	6	36	—	—	—	—	—
2005–06	HK MVD	RSL	15	0	2	2	6	—	—	—	—	—
2005–06	HK MVD–THK Tver	RUS-3	1	0	0	0	4	—	—	—	—	—
2005–06	Amur Khabarovsk	RUS-2	3	0	0	0	2	—	—	—	—	—
2005–06	Khimik Voskresensk	RUS-2	8	1	5	6	6	6	1	1	2	8
2006–07	Khimik Voskresensk	RUS-2	50	5	14	19	62	14	2	5	7	6
2007–08	Torpedo Nizhny Novgorod	RSL	53	0	10	10	28	—	—	—	—	—
2008–09	Torpedo Nizhny Novgorod	KHL	25	0	1	1	14	3	0	1	1	2
2009–10	Torpedo Nizhny Novgorod	KHL	33	2	4	6	54	—	—	—	—	—
2010–11	HC Yugra	KHL	7	0	0	0	0	—	—	—	—	—
2010–11	Krylya Sovetov Moscow	VHL	18	1	3	4	18	—	—	—	—	—
2011–12	Molot–Prikamie Perm	VHL	53	2	5	7	30	3	0	1	1	0
2012–13	Sputnik Nizhny Tagil	VHL	48	6	10	16	38	11	2	2	4	18
2013–14	Sputnik Nizhny Tagil	VHL	40	3	4	7	20	—	—	—	—	—
RUS/RSL totals			320	10	36	46	166	7	0	2	2	2
KHL totals			65	2	5	7	68	3	0	1	1	2
NHL totals			3	1	0	1	0	—	—	—	—	—
