= 1996–97 New Jersey Devils season =

National Hockey League season

1996–97 New Jersey Devils
- Atlantic Division champions
- Division: 1st Atlantic
- Conference: 1st Eastern
- 1996–97 record: 45–23–14
- Home record: 23–9–9
- Road record: 22–14–5
- Goals for: 231
- Goals against: 182

Team information
- General manager: Lou Lamoriello
- Coach: Jacques Lemaire
- Captain: Scott Stevens
- Alternate captains: John MacLean; Ken Daneyko
- Arena: Continental Airlines Arena
- Average attendance: 16,398
- Minor league affiliates: Albany River Rats; Raleigh IceCaps

Team leaders
- Goals: John MacLean and Bill Guerin (29)
- Assists: Bobby Holík (39)
- Points: Bobby Holik (62)
- Penalty minutes: Lyle Odelein (110)
- Plus/minus: Dave Andreychuk (+38)
- Wins: Martin Brodeur (37)
- Goals against average: Martin Brodeur (1.88)

The 1996–97 New Jersey Devils season was the 23rd season for the National Hockey League (NHL) franchise that was established on June 11, 1974, and 15th season since the franchise relocated from Colorado prior to the 1982–83 NHL season. The Devils captured the Atlantic Division title and finished first in the Eastern Conference, but fell in the second round of the playoffs to their arch-rivals, the New York Rangers.

The New Jersey Sports and Exposition Authority was contractually obligated to install a new US$600,000 sound system in Continental Airlines Arena prior to the start of the season.

== Offseason ==
The Devils' head coach Jacques Lemaire expressed his disappointment following the team's loss to the Ottawa Senators in the final game of the 1995–96 season, the first time since 1970 that the defending Stanley Cup champion missed the playoffs in the following season. Lemare was quoted as saying that the team lacked confidence. He also felt that the media, the fans, and some players, misread his commitment to defensive hockey as a detriment to offensive creativity, stating that he never stopped his players from being creative in the offensive zone. He ended up needing to repair his relationship with Devils team captain Scott Stevens due to his comment following the Ottawa game that the team suffered from a "lack of leadership". Stevens reportedly saw the remark as a personal attack, and so himself and Lemare ended up sitting down together in order to discuss the comment. Lemare later stated to the media that the remark was intended to be an indictment of the entire team, himself included.

The 1996 NHL free agent market officially opened on July 1, 1996, following the passing of the June 30 deadline for teams to file contracts with the league. The largest name to become a free agent on July 1 was Wayne Gretzky, who was released from the St. Louis Blues after the team failed to reach an agreement with Gretzky's agent. The Mighty Ducks of Anaheim, Phoenix Coyotes and New York Rangers (who eventually signed him) were reported to have expressed interest in signing Gretzky, but New Jersey Devils general manager Lou Lamoriello told reporters Gretzky did not fit with the team's financial plan. Lamoriello did express a desire to retain Phil Housley, an offensive-minded defenseman who was acquired by the Devils late in the 1995–96 season but who had been released by the team after failing to be signed prior to the deadline. The Devils were unable to sign Housley though, who signed a US$7.7 million three-year deal that included a no-trade clause with the Washington Capitals on July 22, 1996. Lamoriello stated that the team didn't want to make a long term offer, and would not consider a no-trade clause. He reportedly felt that Housley's previous $2.2 million salary was "astronomical".

Speculation the Devils would trade for all-star center Jeremy Roenick, 26 years old at the time, began following the Ranger's signing of Gretzky. In late August, Lou Lamoriello confirmed to the media he was attempting to bring Roenick, a restricted free agent, to the Devils via a trade. Any team signing Roenick out from the Phoenix Coyotes would be required to give the Coyotes five first-round draft picks in compensation, and Lamoriello was quoted as saying, "I have no intentions right now of giving up draft picks." Rumors were reported in the media that Lamoriello considered dealing forwards Bill Guerin, Brian Rolston, Mike Peluso and defenseman Scott Niedermayer for Roenick. Reports the next day reiterated Lamoriello's interest in Roenick, both for the Devils and as a player for Team USA, also included the possibility of including Stephane Richer in a potential trade. However, Richer was traded back to the Montreal Canadiens the following day in exchange for 28-year-old Lyle Odelein, whom the Devils immediately signed to a three-year contract at approximately $1.5 million per season. Roenick eventually signed with the Coyotes, despite interest from the Devils and Capitals, among others.

Amid rumors that the Devils were interested in dealing with the Detroit Red Wings for hold-out center Keith Primeau, Devils center Bobby Holik did not show up to training camp in what was described as a surprising decision on his part to not report to the team. Speculation among teammates and the media was that he wanted a trade. Neal Broten, who was considering retirement at the time, and Mike Peluso, who had been benched by Lemaire during the 1995–96 season and thought that he would be traded over the summer, did report to training camp along with 60 other players. Several regular players who were involved with the 1996 World Cup of Hockey tournament were scheduled to report to camp late.

== Regular season ==
During the regular season, the Devils allowed the fewest goals (182), the fewest power-play goals (28), took the fewest penalties (235) and had the best penalty killing percentage (88.09%) in the league. Coincidentally, they also had the fewest power-play goals (40) and the fewest short-handed goals (4) in the league. Devils goaltenders combined to record 12 shutouts, the most in the NHL and 5 of those shutouts came in the final 10 games of the season.

=== Final standings ===
Atlantic Division
| No. | CR | | GP | W | L | T | GF | GA | Pts |
|---|---|---|---|---|---|---|---|---|---|
| 1 | 1 | **New Jersey Devils** | 82 | 45 | 23 | 14 | 231 | 182 | 104 |
| 2 | 3 | **Philadelphia Flyers** | 82 | 45 | 24 | 13 | 274 | 217 | 103 |
| 3 | 4 | **Florida Panthers** | 82 | 35 | 28 | 19 | 221 | 201 | 89 |
| 4 | 5 | **New York Rangers** | 82 | 38 | 34 | 10 | 258 | 231 | 86 |
| 5 | 9 | Washington Capitals | 82 | 33 | 40 | 9 | 214 | 231 | 75 |
| 6 | 11 | Tampa Bay Lightning | 82 | 32 | 40 | 10 | 217 | 247 | 74 |
| 7 | 12 | New York Islanders | 82 | 29 | 41 | 12 | 240 | 250 | 70 |

Eastern Conference
| R | | Div | GP | W | L | T | GF | GA | Pts |
|---|---|---|---|---|---|---|---|---|---|
| **1** | **New Jersey Devils** | **ATL** | **82** | **45** | **23** | **14** | **231** | **182** | **104** |
| **2** | **Buffalo Sabres** | **NE** | **82** | **40** | **30** | **12** | **237** | **208** | **92** |
| **3** | **Philadelphia Flyers** | **ATL** | **82** | **45** | **24** | **13** | **274** | **217** | **103** |
| **4** | **Florida Panthers** | **ATL** | **82** | **35** | **28** | **19** | **221** | **201** | **89** |
| **5** | **New York Rangers** | **ATL** | **82** | **38** | **34** | **10** | **258** | **231** | **86** |
| **6** | **Pittsburgh Penguins** | **NE** | **82** | **38** | **36** | **8** | **285** | **280** | **84** |
| **7** | **Ottawa Senators** | **NE** | **82** | **31** | **36** | **15** | **226** | **234** | **77** |
| **8** | **Montreal Canadiens** | **NE** | **82** | **31** | **36** | **15** | **249** | **276** | **77** |
| 9 | Washington Capitals | ATL | 82 | 33 | 40 | 9 | 214 | 231 | 75 |
| 10 | Hartford Whalers | NE | 82 | 32 | 39 | 11 | 226 | 256 | 75 |
| 11 | Tampa Bay Lightning | ATL | 82 | 32 | 40 | 10 | 217 | 247 | 74 |
| 12 | New York Islanders | ATL | 82 | 29 | 41 | 12 | 240 | 250 | 70 |
| 13 | Boston Bruins | NE | 82 | 26 | 47 | 9 | 234 | 300 | 61 |

Divisions: ATL – Atlantic, NE – Northeast

bold – Qualified for playoffs

== Playoffs ==
=== Eastern Conference Quarterfinals ===
==== (E1) New Jersey Devils vs. (E8) Montreal Canadiens ====
In the first game of the series against Montreal, on April 17, 1997, with the Devils up by two goals late in the game, Martin Brodeur fired the puck the length of the ice and into the Canadiens' empty net to ensure a 5–2 victory. It was only the second time in NHL history that a goaltender had scored in the playoffs, and the fifth time overall. In the game 2, the Devils were victorious by a score of 4–1. Games three and four were played at Molson Centre. The Devils won game 3 6–4. However, in game 4, Montreal was victorious by a score of 4–3 in the third overtime. Game 5 shifted back to New Jersey where the Devils shut out Montreal 4-0 and won the series 4–1.

=== Eastern Conference Semifinals ===
==== (E1) New Jersey Devils vs. (E5) New York Rangers ====
The series opened at the Meadowlands. The Devils won 2–0 in Game 1, but New York evened the series in Game 2 by winning 2–0. Games 3 and 4 were played at Madison Square Garden. The Rangers won Game 3, 3–2, and Game 4, 3–0. Game 5 was back at the Meadowlands. New York won 2–1 in overtime and the series four games to one on a wraparound goal by Adam Graves to eliminate the Devils and advance.

== Schedule and results ==
=== Regular season ===
1996–97 regular season
October: 4–5–1 (home: 3–2–1; road: 1–3–0)

| Game | Date | Score | Opponent | Record | Recap |
|---|---|---|---|---|---|
| 1 | October 5, 1996 | 3–1 | Detroit Red Wings | 1–0–0 | W |
| 2 | October 7, 1996 | 1–3 | @ Philadelphia Flyers | 1–1–0 | L |
| 3 | October 12, 1996 | 2–4 | Dallas Stars | 1–2–0 | L |
| 4 | October 15, 1996 | 3–2 | Montreal Canadiens | 2–2–0 | W |
| 5 | October 18, 1996 | 2–2 OT | Ottawa Senators | 2–2–1 | T |
| 6 | October 19, 1996 | 2–6 | @ Hartford Whalers | 2–3–1 | L |
| 7 | October 24, 1996 | 3–1 | San Jose Sharks | 3–3–1 | W |
| 8 | October 26, 1996 | 4–1 | @ Tampa Bay Lightning | 4–3–1 | W |
| 9 | October 29, 1996 | 2–5 | @ Boston Bruins | 4–4–1 | L |
| 10 | October 30, 1996 | 1–6 | New York Rangers | 4–5–1 | L |

November: 8–5–0 (home: 4–2–0; road: 4–3–0)

| Game | Date | Score | Opponent | Record | Recap |
|---|---|---|---|---|---|
| 11 | November 2, 1996 | 2–1 | Tampa Bay Lightning | 5–5–1 | W |
| 12 | November 6, 1996 | 2–0 | @ Detroit Red Wings | 6–5–1 | W |
| 13 | November 7, 1996 | 4–2 | @ Chicago Blackhawks | 7–5–1 | W |
| 14 | November 9, 1996 | 4–0 | New York Islanders | 8–5–1 | W |
| 15 | November 12, 1996 | 3–2 OT | Washington Capitals | 9–5–1 | W |
| 16 | November 14, 1996 | 0–3 | Vancouver Canucks | 9–6–1 | L |
| 17 | November 16, 1996 | 6–3 | Tampa Bay Lightning | 10–6–1 | W |
| 18 | November 19, 1996 | 2–1 | @ Ottawa Senators | 11–6–1 | W |
| 19 | November 22, 1996 | 1–5 | Washington Capitals | 11–7–1 | L |
| 20 | November 23, 1996 | 3–4 | @ Washington Capitals | 11–8–1 | L |
| 21 | November 27, 1996 | 3–2 | @ Dallas Stars | 12–8–1 | W |
| 22 | November 28, 1996 | 3–4 OT | @ Phoenix Coyotes | 12–9–1 | L |
| 23 | November 30, 1996 | 1–2 | @ Colorado Avalanche | 12–10–1 | L |

December: 8–3–2 (home: 3–1–2; road: 5–2–0)

| Game | Date | Score | Opponent | Record | Recap |
|---|---|---|---|---|---|
| 24 | December 3, 1996 | 2–0 | Florida Panthers | 13–10–1 | W |
| 25 | December 5, 1996 | 2–1 | Calgary Flames | 14–10–1 | W |
| 26 | December 7, 1996 | 3–4 OT | Phoenix Coyotes | 14–11–1 | L |
| 27 | December 10, 1996 | 5–2 | @ Toronto Maple Leafs | 15–11–1 | W |
| 28 | December 12, 1996 | 7–4 | @ Boston Bruins | 16–11–1 | W |
| 29 | December 14, 1996 | 3–3 OT | Montreal Canadiens | 16–11–2 | T |
| 30 | December 16, 1996 | 5–0 | @ Calgary Flames | 17–11–2 | W |
| 31 | December 18, 1996 | 2–1 | @ Vancouver Canucks | 18–11–2 | W |
| 32 | December 20, 1996 | 3–2 | @ Edmonton Oilers | 19–11–2 | W |
| 33 | December 23, 1996 | 0–0 OT | Buffalo Sabres | 19–11–3 | T |
| 34 | December 26, 1996 | 1–4 | @ New York Islanders | 19–12–3 | L |
| 35 | December 28, 1996 | 5–3 | Mighty Ducks of Anaheim | 20–12–3 | W |
| 36 | December 31, 1996 | 5–6 | @ Buffalo Sabres | 20–13–3 | L |

January: 4–4–4 (home: 1–2–4; road: 3–2–0)

| Game | Date | Score | Opponent | Record | Recap |
|---|---|---|---|---|---|
| 37 | January 2, 1997 | 1–6 | Pittsburgh Penguins | 20–14–3 | L |
| 38 | January 3, 1997 | 1–0 | @ Ottawa Senators | 21–14–3 | W |
| 39 | January 5, 1997 | 3–5 | St. Louis Blues | 21–15–3 | L |
| 40 | January 8, 1997 | 1–1 OT | Colorado Avalanche | 21–15–4 | T |
| 41 | January 10, 1997 | 3–3 OT | Chicago Blackhawks | 21–15–5 | T |
| 42 | January 12, 1997 | 0–3 | @ New York Rangers | 21–16–5 | L |
| 43 | January 14, 1997 | 4–2 | Boston Bruins | 22–16–5 | W |
| 44 | January 21, 1997 | 4–1 | @ Los Angeles Kings | 23–16–5 | W |
| 45 | January 22, 1997 | 1–3 | @ Mighty Ducks of Anaheim | 23–17–5 | L |
| 46 | January 24, 1997 | 3–1 | @ San Jose Sharks | 24–17–5 | W |
| 47 | January 29, 1997 | 1–1 OT | Ottawa Senators | 24–17–6 | T |
| 48 | January 31, 1997 | 3–3 OT | Toronto Maple Leafs | 24–17–7 | T |

February: 7–1–5 (home: 4–0–2; road: 3–1–3)

| Game | Date | Score | Opponent | Record | Recap |
|---|---|---|---|---|---|
| 49 | February 1, 1997 | 4–4 OT | @ Montreal Canadiens | 24–17–8 | T |
| 50 | February 5, 1997 | 4–1 | New York Islanders | 25–17–8 | W |
| 51 | February 7, 1997 | 2–2 OT | Florida Panthers | 25–17–9 | T |
| 52 | February 8, 1997 | 4–2 | Philadelphia Flyers | 26–17–9 | W |
| 53 | February 12, 1997 | 3–2 | @ Hartford Whalers | 27–17–9 | W |
| 54 | February 13, 1997 | 4–0 | Hartford Whalers | 28–17–9 | W |
| 55 | February 15, 1997 | 4–1 | @ Montreal Canadiens | 29–17–9 | W |
| 56 | February 17, 1997 | 2–2 OT | @ New York Rangers | 29–17–10 | T |
| 57 | February 19, 1997 | 1–1 OT | New York Rangers | 29–17–11 | T |
| 58 | February 20, 1997 | 2–2 OT | @ Florida Panthers | 29–17–12 | T |
| 59 | February 22, 1997 | 1–3 | @ Tampa Bay Lightning | 29–18–12 | L |
| 60 | February 26, 1997 | 5–3 | @ New York Islanders | 30–18–12 | W |
| 61 | February 27, 1997 | 4–1 | Buffalo Sabres | 31–18–12 | W |

March: 10–3–1 (home: 6–2–0; road: 4–1–1)

| Game | Date | Score | Opponent | Record | Recap |
|---|---|---|---|---|---|
| 62 | March 1, 1997 | 6–3 | Pittsburgh Penguins | 32–18–12 | W |
| 63 | March 4, 1997 | 3–1 | @ Pittsburgh Penguins | 33–18–12 | W |
| 64 | March 5, 1997 | 3–1 | @ Philadelphia Flyers | 34–18–12 | W |
| 65 | March 8, 1997 | 1–5 | @ New York Islanders | 34–19–12 | L |
| 66 | March 9, 1997 | 4–1 | @ Buffalo Sabres | 35–19–12 | W |
| 67 | March 11, 1997 | 6–1 | Edmonton Oilers | 36–19–12 | W |
| 68 | March 13, 1997 | 6–0 | Hartford Whalers | 37–19–12 | W |
| 69 | March 15, 1997 | 3–2 | Washington Capitals | 38–19–12 | W |
| 70 | March 17, 1997 | 1–4 | Florida Panthers | 38–20–12 | L |
| 71 | March 19, 1997 | 2–2 OT | @ Washington Capitals | 38–20–13 | T |
| 72 | March 22, 1997 | 3–2 | @ Pittsburgh Penguins | 39–20–13 | W |
| 73 | March 25, 1997 | 3–4 | Philadelphia Flyers | 39–21–13 | L |
| 74 | March 27, 1997 | 4–0 | New York Rangers | 40–21–13 | W |
| 75 | March 30, 1997 | 5–2 | Los Angeles Kings | 41–21–13 | W |

April: 4–2–1 (home: 2–0–0; road: 2–2–1)

| Game | Date | Score | Opponent | Record | Recap |
|---|---|---|---|---|---|
| 76 | April 1, 1997 | 1–0 | @ Washington Capitals | 42–21–13 | W |
| 77 | April 4, 1997 | 3–0 | Tampa Bay Lightning | 43–21–13 | W |
| 78 | April 6, 1997 | 2–0 | @ St. Louis Blues | 44–21–13 | W |
| 79 | April 8, 1997 | 2–2 OT | @ Tampa Bay Lightning | 44–21–14 | T |
| 80 | April 9, 1997 | 2–4 | @ Florida Panthers | 44–22–14 | L |
| 81 | April 11, 1997 | 2–0 | Boston Bruins | 45–22–14 | W |
| 82 | April 13, 1997 | 4–5 | @ Philadelphia Flyers | 45–23–14 | L |

Legend: W Win (2 points) L Loss (0 points) T Tie (1 point)

=== Playoffs ===
1997 Stanley Cup playoffs
Eastern Conference Quarterfinals vs. (8) Montreal Canadiens – Devils win 4–1

| Game | Date | Score | Opponent | Series | Recap |
|---|---|---|---|---|---|
| 1 | April 17, 1997 | 5–2 | Montreal Canadiens | Devils lead 1–0 | W |
| 2 | April 19, 1997 | 4–1 | Montreal Canadiens | Devils lead 2–0 | W |
| 3 | April 22, 1997 | 6–4 | @ Montreal Canadiens | Devils lead 3–0 | W |
| 4 | April 24, 1997 | 3–4 3OT | @ Montreal Canadiens | Devils lead 3–1 | L |
| 5 | April 26, 1997 | 4–0 | Montreal Canadiens | Devils win 4–1 | W |

Eastern Conference Semifinals vs. (5) New York Rangers – Rangers win 4–1

| Game | Date | Score | Opponent | Series | Recap |
|---|---|---|---|---|---|
| 1 | May 2, 1997 | 2–0 | New York Rangers | Devils lead 1–0 | W |
| 2 | May 4, 1997 | 0–2 | New York Rangers | Series tied 1–1 | L |
| 3 | May 6, 1997 | 2–3 | @ New York Rangers | Rangers lead 2–1 | L |
| 4 | May 8, 1997 | 0–3 | @ New York Rangers | Rangers lead 3–1 | L |
| 5 | May 11, 1997 | 1–2 OT | New York Rangers | Rangers win 4–1 | L |

Legend: W Win L Loss

== Player statistics ==
=== Scoring ===
- Position abbreviations: C = Center; D = Defense; G = Goaltender; LW = Left wing; RW = Right wing
- † = Joined team via a transaction (e.g., trade, waivers, signing) during the season. Stats reflect time with the Devils only.
- ‡ = Left team via a transaction (e.g., trade, waivers, release) during the season. Stats reflect time with the Devils only.

| No. | Player | Pos | Regular season | | | | | | Playoffs | | | | | |
| No. | Player | Pos | GP | G | A | Pts | +/- | PIM | GP | G | A | Pts | +/- | PIM |
|---|---|---|---|---|---|---|---|---|---|---|---|---|---|---|
| 16 | Bobby Holik | C | 82 | 23 | 39 | 62 | 24 | 54 | 10 | 2 | 3 | 5 | 1 | 4 |
| 23 | Dave Andreychuk | LW | 82 | 27 | 34 | 61 | 38 | 48 | 1 | 0 | 0 | 0 | 0 | 0 |
| 15 | John MacLean | RW | 80 | 29 | 25 | 54 | 11 | 49 | 10 | 4 | 5 | 9 | 1 | 4 |
| 12 | Bill Guerin | RW | 82 | 29 | 18 | 47 | −2 | 95 | 8 | 2 | 1 | 3 | −5 | 18 |
| 14 | Brian Rolston | LW | 81 | 18 | 27 | 45 | 6 | 20 | 10 | 4 | 1 | 5 | 0 | 6 |
| 25 | Valeri Zelepukin | LW | 71 | 14 | 24 | 38 | −10 | 36 | 8 | 3 | 2 | 5 | 3 | 2 |
| 27 | Scott Niedermayer | D | 81 | 5 | 30 | 35 | −4 | 64 | 10 | 2 | 4 | 6 | 0 | 6 |
| 32 | Steve Thomas | LW | 57 | 15 | 19 | 34 | 9 | 46 | 10 | 1 | 1 | 2 | −6 | 18 |
| 10 | Denis Pederson | C | 70 | 12 | 20 | 32 | 7 | 62 | 9 | 0 | 0 | 0 | −2 | 2 |
| 21 | Randy McKay | RW | 77 | 9 | 18 | 27 | 15 | 109 | 10 | 1 | 1 | 2 | 1 | 0 |
| 4 | Scott Stevens | D | 79 | 5 | 19 | 24 | 26 | 70 | 10 | 0 | 4 | 4 | −2 | 2 |
| 11 | Steve Sullivan‡ | RW | 33 | 8 | 14 | 22 | 9 | 14 | — | — | — | — | — | — |
| 93 | Doug Gilmour† | C | 20 | 7 | 15 | 22 | 7 | 22 | 10 | 0 | 4 | 4 | −2 | 14 |
| 29 | Shawn Chambers | D | 73 | 4 | 17 | 21 | 17 | 19 | 10 | 1 | 6 | 7 | −2 | 6 |
| 19 | Bobby Carpenter | C | 62 | 4 | 15 | 19 | 6 | 14 | 10 | 1 | 2 | 3 | 2 | 2 |
| 24 | Lyle Odelein | D | 79 | 3 | 13 | 16 | 16 | 110 | 10 | 2 | 2 | 4 | −3 | 19 |
| 20 | Jay Pandolfo | LW | 46 | 6 | 8 | 14 | −1 | 6 | 6 | 0 | 1 | 1 | −2 | 0 |
| 3 | Ken Daneyko | D | 77 | 2 | 7 | 9 | 24 | 70 | 10 | 0 | 0 | 0 | 1 | 28 |
| 2 | Dave Ellett† | D | 20 | 2 | 5 | 7 | 2 | 6 | 10 | 0 | 3 | 3 | −1 | 10 |
| 28 | Kevin Dean | D | 28 | 2 | 4 | 6 | 2 | 6 | 1 | 1 | 0 | 1 | 1 | 0 |
| 26 (Note: Elias wore number 22 during the regular season.) | Patrik Elias | LW | 17 | 2 | 3 | 5 | −4 | 2 | 8 | 2 | 3 | 5 | 0 | 4 |
| 18 | Sergei Brylin | LW | 29 | 2 | 2 | 4 | −13 | 20 | — | — | — | — | — | — |
| 30 | Martin Brodeur | G | 67 | 0 | 4 | 4 | | 8 | 10 | 1 | 0 | 1 | | 0 |
| 33 | Reid Simpson | LW | 27 | 0 | 4 | 4 | 0 | 60 | 5 | 0 | 0 | 0 | −1 | 29 |
| 26 | Jason Smith‡ | D | 57 | 1 | 2 | 3 | −8 | 38 | — | — | — | — | — | — |
| 17 | Petr Sykora | RW | 19 | 1 | 2 | 3 | −8 | 4 | 2 | 0 | 0 | 0 | 1 | 2 |
| 22 | Peter Zezel† | C | 18 | 0 | 3 | 3 | 4 | 4 | 2 | 0 | 0 | 0 | 0 | 10 |
| 8 | Mike Peluso‡ | LW | 20 | 0 | 2 | 2 | 0 | 68 | — | — | — | — | — | — |
| 8 | Pascal Rheaume | C | 2 | 1 | 0 | 1 | 1 | 0 | — | — | — | — | — | — |
| 9 | Neal Broten‡ | C | 3 | 0 | 1 | 1 | −1 | 0 | — | — | — | — | — | — |
| 1 | Mike Dunham | G | 26 | 0 | 0 | 0 | | 2 | — | — | — | — | — | — |
| 26 | Krzysztof Oliwa | LW | 1 | 0 | 0 | 0 | −1 | 5 | — | — | — | — | — | — |
| 5 | Ricard Persson‡ | D | 1 | 0 | 0 | 0 | 0 | 0 | — | — | — | — | — | — |
| 35 | Jeff Reese | G | 3 | 0 | 0 | 0 | | 0 | — | — | — | — | — | — |
| 9 | Vadim Sharifijanov | LW | 2 | 0 | 0 | 0 | 0 | 0 | — | — | — | — | — | — |

=== Goaltending ===
| No. | Player | Regular season | | | | | | | | | | Playoffs | | | | | | | | |
| No. | Player | GP | W | L | T | SA | GA | GAA | SV% | SO | TOI | GP | W | L | SA | GA | GAA | SV% | SO | TOI |
|---|---|---|---|---|---|---|---|---|---|---|---|---|---|---|---|---|---|---|---|---|
| 30 | Martin Brodeur | 67 | 37 | 14 | 13 | 1633 | 120 | 1.88 | .927 | 10 | 3838 | 10 | 5 | 5 | 268 | 19 | 1.73 | .929 | 2 | 659 |
| 1 | Mike Dunham | 26 | 8 | 7 | 1 | 456 | 43 | 2.55 | .906 | 2 | 1013 | — | — | — | — | — | — | — | — | — |
| 35 | Jeff Reese | 3 | 0 | 2 | 0 | 65 | 13 | 5.62 | .800 | 0 | 139 | — | — | — | — | — | — | — | — | — |

== Awards and records ==
=== Awards ===
Martin Brodeur was also a runner-up for the Vezina Trophy.

| Type | Award/honor | Recipient | Ref |
|---|---|---|---|
| League (annual) | NHL Second All-Star Team | Martin Brodeur (Goaltender) | |
| League (annual) | NHL Second All-Star Team | Scott Stevens (Defense) | |
| League (annual) | William M. Jennings Trophy | Martin Brodeur | |
| League (annual) | William M. Jennings Trophy | Mike Dunham | |
| League (in-season) | NHL All-Star Game selection | Martin Brodeur | |
| League (in-season) | NHL All-Star Game selection | Scott Stevens | |
| Team | Devils' Players' Player | Dave Andreychuk | |
| Team | Hugh Delano Unsung Hero | Denis Pederson | |
| Team | Most Valuable Devil | Martin Brodeur | |
| Team | Three-Star Award | Martin Brodeur | |

=== Milestones ===
| Milestone | Player | Date | Ref |
|---|---|---|---|
| 1,000th game played | Bobby Carpenter | October 19, 1996 | |
| First game | Mike Dunham | October 29, 1996 | |
| First game | Jay Pandolfo | November 14, 1996 | |
| First game | Vadim Sharifijanov | January 3, 1997 | |
| First game | Pascal Rheaume | February 20, 1997 | |
| First game | Krzysztof Oliwa | March 9, 1997 | |

== Draft picks ==
The New Jersey Devils were 10th in order of selection at the 1996 NHL entry draft, held June 22, 1996, in St. Louis. In a move interpreted to be an affirmation of their commitment to a defense-first philosophy, the Devils chose 6–3, 195-pound Lance Ward of the Western Hockey League's Red Deer Rebels, who had not been ranked anywhere near the tenth seed to observers, with their first pick.

"I was a bit surprised to go early because there are a lot of great players [here], but I'm a pretty happy kid right now", Ward said. "I was hoping to go in the first round but you never know what's going to happen. It was a pretty open field and I guess [the Devils] liked me. They flew me to Toronto for a physical test and an interview [last month] and I guess I did well." Devils general manager Lou Lamoriello was impressed with Ward's potential to be yet another hard-hitting New Jersey defenseman, stating, "We liked [Ward's] potential as far as his upside is concerned", Lamoriello said. "We have guys like Scott Stevens and Ken Daneyko on our team and this young man [is like them]. He's strong now, he's mean, and he's got skills."

During the draft, the Devils traded backup goaltender Corey Schwab to the Tampa Bay Lightning in exchange for their backup goalie Jeff Reese along with their second-round (47th overall) and eighth-round (198th overall) picks in the draft. The Devils then traded their original second round pick (28th overall) to the Pittsburgh Penguins in exchange for the Penguins' two second-round picks (41st and 47th overall).

| Rd # | Pick # | Player | Nat | Pos | Team (League) | Notes |
| 1 | 10 | Lance Ward | Canada | D | Red Deer Rebels (WHL) | (Note: Never reported for the Devils; was subsequently redrafted by Florida in the third round (63rd overall) of the 1998 Draft.) |
| 2 | 38 | Wes Mason | Canada | LW | Sarnia Sting (OHL) | (Note: The Devils acquired the 1996 second-round pick (Mason) from Vancouver for Esa Tikkanen on November 23, 1995; Tikkanen had been acquired from St. Louis just 22 days earlier.) |
| 2 | 41 | Josh DeWolf | United States | D | Twin Cities Vulcans (USHL) | (Note: The Devils acquired two 1996 second-round picks, DeWolf (originally Toronto's) and White, from Pittsburgh for San Jose's 1996 second-round pick (used on Pavel Skrbek) on June 22, 1996. The Devils had originally received the pick from San Jose in exchange for Chris Terreri on November 15, 1995.) |
| 2 | 47 | Pierre Dagenais | Canada | LW | Moncton Alpines (QMJHL) | (Note: The Devils traded Corey Schwab to Tampa Bay in exchange for Jeff Reese, Chicago's 1996 second-round pick (Dagenais), and Tampa Bay's 1996 eighth-round pick (Bertsch), on June 22, 1996.) |
| 2 | 49 | Colin White | Canada | D | Hull Olympiques (QMJHL) | (Note: Although the Devils made four picks in the second round of the 1996 Draft, none were originally their picks; the Devils' original pick (used on Marek Posmyk) was traded to Toronto in exchange for Dave Andreychuk on March 13, 1996.) |
| 3 | 63 | Scott Parker | Canada | RW | Kelowna Rockets (WHL) | (Note: Parker never reported for the Devils; he was subsequently redrafted by Colorado in the first round (20th overall) of the 1998 Draft.) |
| 4 | 91 | Josef Boumedienne | Sweden | D | Huddinge IK (Allsvenskan) | |
| 4 | 101 | Josh MacNevin | Canada | D | Vernon Vipers (BCJHL) | (Note: Compensatory pick awarded by the NHL as compensation for free agent Bruce Driver.) |
| 5 | 118 | Glenn Crawford | Canada | LW | Windsor Spitfires (OHL) | |
| 6 | 145 | Sean Ritchlin | United States | RW | University of Michigan (CCHA) | |
| 7 | 173 | Daryl Andrews | Canada | D | Melfort Mustangs (SJHL) | |
| 8 | 199 | Willie Mitchell | Canada | D | Melfort Mustangs (SJHL) | |
| 8 | 205 | Jay Bertsch | Canada | RW | Spokane Chiefs (WHL) | (Note: Bertsch had previously been drafted by Quebec in the eighth round (191st overall) of the 1994 Draft.) |
| 9 | 225 | Pasi Petrilainen | Finland | D | Tappara (SM-liiga) | |

== Media ==
This was the final season of television broadcast coverage on SportsChannel New York as the channel would rebrand itself to Fox Sports Net New York the following season.
