= Paxton Schafer =

Canadian ice hockey player (born 1976)

- Born: February 26, 1976 (age 50) Medicine Hat, Alberta, Canada
- Height: 5 ft 9 in (175 cm)
- Weight: 152 lb (69 kg; 10 st 12 lb)
- Position: Goaltender
- Caught: Left
- Played for: Boston Bruins
- NHL draft: 47th overall, 1995; Boston Bruins
- Playing career: 1996–2003

Paxton Schafer (born February 26, 1976) is a Canadian former professional ice hockey goaltender. Schafer was drafted 47th overall by the Boston Bruins in the 1995 NHL entry draft and played three games for them during the 1996–97 season. The rest of his career, which lasted from 1996 to 2003, was spent in various minor leagues. He later spent several years playing senior hockey, finally retiring in 2012.

== Career statistics ==
=== Regular season and playoffs ===
			Regular season									Playoffs
Season	Team	League	GP	W	L	T	MIN	GA	SO	GAA	SV%	GP	W	L	MIN	GA	SO	GAA	SV%
1990–91	Medicine Hat Elks	ABMHL	12	—	—	—	—	—	—	4.81	—	—	—	—	—	—	—	—	—
1991–92	Medicine Hat Elks	ABMHL	17	—	—	—	—	—	—	3.55	—	—	—	—	—	—	—	—	—
1992–93	Medicine Hat Tigers U18	AAHA	27	—	—	—	1601	95	1	3.56	—	—	—	—	—	—	—	—	—
1993–94	Medicine Hat Tigers	WHL	19	6	9	1	909	67	0	4.42	.866	—	—	—	—	—	—	—	—
1994–95	Medicine Hat Tigers	WHL	61	32	26	2	3519	185	0	3.15	.901	5	1	4	339	18	0	3.19	.916
1995–96	Medicine Hat Tigers	WHL	60	24	30	3	3256	200	1	3.69	.905	5	1	4	251	25	0	5.98	.833
1996–97	Boston Bruins	NHL	3	0	0	0	78	6	0	4.65	.760	—	—	—	—	—	—	—	—
1996–97	Providence Bruins	AHL	22	9	10	0	1206	75	1	3.73	.882	—	—	—	—	—	—	—	—
1996–97	Charlotte Checkers	ECHL	4	3	1	0	239	7	0	1.75	.939	—	—	—	—	—	—	—	—
1997–98	Providence Bruins	AHL	3	1	1	0	158	11	0	4.16	.890	—	—	—	—	—	—	—	—
1997–98	Charlotte Checkers	ECHL	44	21	17	5	2538	131	1	3.10	.902	7	3	4	428	21	0	2.94	—
1998–99	Greenville Grrrowl	ECHL	40	17	16	7	2326	115	2	2.97	.908	—	—	—	—	—	—	—	—
1998–99	Providence Bruins	AHL	1	1	0	0	61	3	0	2.94	.906	—	—	—	—	—	—	—	—
1999–00	Pee Dee Pride	ECHL	41	26	10	2	2331	94	2	2.42	.920	2	0	1	98	8	0	4.91	.833
2000–01	Baton Rouge Kingfish	ECHL	44	21	10	9	2564	130	0	3.04	.907	2	0	2	118	8	0	4.00	.895
2000–01	Cincinnati Mighty Ducks	AHL	1	0	0	0	16	0	0	0.00	1.000	—	—	—	—	—	—	—	—
2001–02	Baton Rouge Kingfish	ECHL	14	5	9	0	764	45	0	3.53	.912	—	—	—	—	—	—	—	—
2001–02	New Orleans Brass	ECHL	19	8	6	1	977	45	2	2.76	.917	—	—	—	—	—	—	—	—
2002–03	Baton Rouge Kingfish	ECHL	6	2	4	0	357	25	0	4.21	.855	—	—	—	—	—	—	—	—
2002–03	Quad City Mallards	UHL	9	4	1	2	454	21	0	2.78	.911	—	—	—	—	—	—	—	—
2002–03	Flint Generals	UHL	27	9	12	3	1525	89	1	3.50	.887	—	—	—	—	—	—	—	—
2002–03	Missouri River Otters	UHL	—	—	—	—	—	—	—	—	—	3	0	3	205	13	0	3.80	.886
2003–04	Oyen Eagles	SWHL	19	—	—	—	—	—	—	5.03	.883	—	—	—	—	—	—	—	—
2004–05	Oyen Eagles	SWHL	—	—	—	—	—	—	—	—	—	—	—	—	—	—	—	—	—
2005–06	Oyen Eagles	SWHL	—	—	—	—	—	—	—	—	—	—	—	—	—	—	—	—	—
2006–07	Oyen Eagles	SWHL	20	—	—	—	—	—	—	3.82	.904	—	—	—	—	—	—	—	—
2007–08	Oyen Eagles	SWHL	—	—	—	—	—	—	—	—	—	5	—	—	—	—	—	2.60	.925
2010–11	Kindersley Red Lions	SWHL	—	—	—	—	—	—	—	—	—	—	—	—	—	—	—	—	—
2011–12	Kindersley Red Lions	SWHL	—	—	—	—	—	—	—	—	—	9	—	—	—	—	—	3.35	.913
NHL totals			3	0	0	0	78	6	0	4.65	.760	—	—	—	—	—	—	—	—

== Awards ==
- WHL East First All-Star Team – 1995
