= P. C. Drouin =

Canadian ice hockey player

- Born: April 22, 1974 (age 51) Quebec City, Quebec, Canada
- Height: 6 ft 2 in (188 cm)
- Weight: 208 lb (94 kg; 14 st 12 lb)
- Position: Left wing
- Shot: Left
- Played for: Boston Bruins
- NHL draft: Undrafted
- Playing career: 1996–2011

Pierre-Claude Drouin (born April 22, 1974) is a Canadian former professional ice hockey left winger who played for the Boston Bruins, various teams in Europe, and the Fort Wayne Komets of the Central Hockey League.

== Playing career ==
As a youth, Drouin played in the 1987 Quebec International Pee-Wee Hockey Tournament with a minor ice hockey team from Saint-Jean-sur-Richelieu.

Drouin played for Cornell University Big Red in the NCAA, and has represented a number of professional hockey teams. He has played 3 NHL games for the Boston Bruins in the 1996–97 NHL season, scoring no points.

He was signed by the Bruins from Cornell University as a free agent and had spells in the American Hockey League with the Providence Bruins and the ECHL for the Charlotte Checkers. In 1998, he moved to the United Kingdom to play in the now-defunct British Ice Hockey Superleague for the Bracknell Bees, where he won the Superleague title in 1999–2000. He then moved to the Nottingham Panthers in a two-year spell which saw him lead the team in points both seasons. He then played in Germany's Deutsche Eishockey Liga for the Augsburger Panther and then in Finland's SM-liiga for JYP and Jokerit.

He returned to America and joined the Fort Wayne Komets of the United Hockey League in an impressive two-year spell which saw him [score 24 goals and 50 assists for 74 points in both seasons. He then spent a season with the Hockey Club de Morzine Avoriaz in France as a player/assistant coach, before returning to the Nottingham Panthers as a player/assistant coach in 2007. After being released by Nottingham mid-season, Drouin returned home to Fort Wayne, where he helped the Fort Wayne Komets win the Turner Cup in a dramatic final in 2008. He returned to the Fort Wayne Komets for the third straight year.

== Career statistics ==
=== Regular season and playoffs ===
			Regular season					Playoffs
Season	Team	League	GP	G	A	Pts	PIM	GP	G	A	Pts	PIM
1991–92	Gloucester Rangers	CJHL	49	23	51	74	59	—	—	—	—	—
1992–93	Cornell University	ECAC	23	3	6	9	30	—	—	—	—	—
1993–94	Cornell University	ECAC	21	6	14	20	30	—	—	—	—	—
1994–95	Cornell University	ECAC	26	4	15	19	58	—	—	—	—	—
1995–96	Cornell University	ECAC	31	18	14	32	60	—	—	—	—	—
1996–97	Providence Bruins	AHL	42	12	11	23	10	—	—	—	—	—
1996–97	Boston Bruins	NHL	3	0	0	0	0	—	—	—	—	—
1997–98	Providence Bruins	AHL	7	0	2	2	4	—	—	—	—	—
1997–98	Charlotte Checkers	ECHL	62	21	46	67	57	7	2	4	6	4
1998–99	Bracknell Bees	BISL	42	12	21	33	12	—	—	—	—	—
1999–00	Bracknell Bees	BISL	40	15	29	44	46	6	2	3	5	10
2000–01	Nottingham Panthers	BISL	48	20	34	54	64	6	3	2	5	18
2001–02	Nottingham Panthers	BISL	48	18	34	52	78	6	2	4	6	4
2002–03	Augsburger Panther	DEL	52	12	25	37	96	—	—	—	—	—
2003–04	Jokerit	SM-l	57	11	15	26	82	8	2	2	4	8
2004–05	Fort Wayne Komets	UHL	78	24	50	74	87	18	8	11	19	26
2005–06	Fort Wayne Komets	UHL	72	24	50	74	92	5	0	6	6	2
2006–07	Pingouins de Morzine-Avoriaz	FRA	26	20	17	37	78	10	9	7	16	22
2007–08	Nottingham Panthers	EIHL	16	4	11	15	26	—	—	—	—	—
2007–08	Fort Wayne Komets	IHL	62	23	51	74	53	13	3	4	7	8
2008–09	Fort Wayne Komets	IHL	75	32	66	98	93	—	—	—	—	—
2009–10	Fort Wayne Komets	IHL	76	26	56	82	58	12	5	13	18	16
UHL/IHL totals			363	129	273	402	382	48	16	34	50	52
NHL totals			3	0	0	0	0	—	—	—	—	—
