= Andreas Dackell =

Swedish ice hockey player

- Born: 29 December 1972 (age 53) Gävle, Sweden
- Height: 1.80 m (5 ft 11 in)
- Weight: 88 kg (194 lb; 13 st 12 lb)
- Position: Right wing
- Shot: Right
- Played for: Brynäs IF; Ottawa Senators; Montreal Canadiens
- National team: Sweden
- NHL draft: 136th overall, 1996; Ottawa Senators
- Playing career: 1990–2012

Olympic medal record

Men's Ice hockey
Gold medal – first place	1994 Lillehammer	Team competition

Andreas Lars Dackell (born 29 December 1972) is a Swedish former professional ice hockey player. He played for several seasons with Brynäs IF in the Swedish league Elitserien (SEL) and was drafted by the Ottawa Senators in the sixth round of the 1996 NHL entry draft.

== Playing career ==
In Ottawa he was well suited as a defence-minded forward, who scored few goals but played an important role on the penalty kill and when trying to keep leads.

After acquiring Bill Muckalt from the New York Islanders the Senators traded Dackell due to his more expensive contract. He was traded to the Montreal Canadiens during the 2001 draft for a seventh round pick.

Dackell saw less success in Montreal than he had in Ottawa. During the 2004–05 lockout he returned to Brynäs IF, and remained there until the end of his career.

In the 2011–12 season, Dackell went through a knee surgery in October 2011 and only played 16 games in the regular season. After 6 playoff games, Dackell announced his retirement, citing his knee injury.

== Career statistics ==
=== Regular season and playoffs ===
			Regular season					Playoffs
Season	Team	League	GP	G	A	Pts	PIM	GP	G	A	Pts	PIM
1990–91	Strömsbro/Gävle HF 83	SWE II	29	21	9	30	12	—	—	—	—	—
1990–91	Brynäs IF	SEL	3	0	1	1	2	1	0	0	0	0
1991–92	Gävle HF 83	SWE II	26	17	24	41	42	2	3	1	4	2
1991–92	Brynäs IF	SEL	5	0	0	0	2	2	0	1	1	4
1992–93	Brynäs IF	SEL	40	12	15	27	12	10	4	5	9	2
1993–94	Brynäs IF	SEL	38	12	17	29	51	7	2	2	4	4
1994–95	Brynäs IF	SEL	39	16	14	30	34	14	3	3	6	14
1995–96	Brynäs IF	SEL	22	6	6	12	8	—	—	—	—	—
1995–96	Brynäs IF	Allsv	18	19	16	35	31	10	9	6	15	12
1996–97	Ottawa Senators	NHL	79	12	19	31	8	7	1	0	1	0
1997–98	Ottawa Senators	NHL	82	15	18	33	24	11	1	1	2	2
1998–99	Ottawa Senators	NHL	77	15	35	50	30	4	0	1	1	0
1999–2000	Ottawa Senators	NHL	82	10	25	35	18	6	2	1	3	2
2000–01	Ottawa Senators	NHL	81	13	18	31	24	4	0	0	0	0
2001–02	Montreal Canadiens	NHL	79	15	18	33	24	12	1	2	3	6
2002–03	Montreal Canadiens	NHL	73	7	18	25	24	—	—	—	—	—
2003–04	Montreal Canadiens	NHL	60	4	8	12	10	—	—	—	—	—
2004–05	Brynäs IF	SEL	40	9	13	22	48	—	—	—	—	—
2005–06	Brynäs IF	SEL	40	6	14	20	22	4	0	0	0	2
2006–07	Brynäs IF	SEL	54	7	21	28	67	7	2	7	9	4
2007–08	Brynäs IF	SEL	54	7	18	25	40	—	—	—	—	—
2008–09	Brynäs IF	SEL	55	13	27	40	44	4	0	1	1	4
2009–10	Brynäs IF	SEL	48	9	24	33	26	5	0	1	1	6
2010–11	Brynäs IF	SEL	53	11	25	36	26	—	—	—	—	—
2011–12	Brynäs IF	SEL	16	4	5	9	6	6	0	1	1	25
SEL totals			506	113	201	314	384	60	11	21	32	65
NHL totals			613	91	159	250	162	44	5	5	10	10

=== International ===
Year	Team	Event	GP	G	A	Pts	PIM
1994	Sweden	OG	4	0	0	0	0
1994	Sweden	WC	7	2	2	4	25
1995	Sweden	WC	8	3	4	7	4
1996	Sweden	WC	6	0	1	1	0
Senior totals			25	5	7	12	29
