= Phil von Stefenelli =

Canadian ice hockey player

- Born: April 10, 1969 (age 57) Vancouver, British Columbia, Canada
- Height: 6 ft 1 in (185 cm)
- Weight: 200 lb (91 kg; 14 st 4 lb)
- Position: Defence
- Shot: Left
- Played for: Boston Bruins; Ottawa Senators; Frankfurt Lions; Krefeld Pinguine; Hamburg Freezers; ERC Ingolstadt
- NHL draft: 122nd overall, 1988; Vancouver Canucks
- Playing career: 1991–2006

Philip von Stefenelli (born April 10, 1969) is a Canadian former professional ice hockey defenceman.

== Career ==
von Stefenelli was drafted 122nd overall by the Vancouver Canucks in the 1988 NHL entry draft. He played two seasons in the National Hockey League, 27 games for the Boston Bruins in the 1995-96 season and 6 games for the Ottawa Senators in the 1996-97 NHL season.

From 1998 to 2006, von Stefenelli played in the Deutsche Eishockey Liga in Germany, playing for the Frankfurt Lions, Krefeld Pinguine, Hamburg Freezers and ERC Ingolstadt.

== Career statistics ==
			Regular season					Playoffs
Season	Team	League	GP	G	A	Pts	PIM	GP	G	A	Pts	PIM
1985–86	Richmond Sockeyes	BCJHL	41	6	11	17	28	—	—	—	—	—
1986–87	Richmond Sockeyes	BCJHL	35	5	19	24	39	—	—	—	—	—
1986–87	Langley Eagles	BCJHL	17	0	13	13	12	—	—	—	—	—
1987–88	Boston University	NCAA	34	3	13	16	38	—	—	—	—	—
1988–89	Boston University	NCAA	33	2	6	8	34	—	—	—	—	—
1989–90	Boston University	NCAA	44	8	20	28	40	—	—	—	—	—
1990–91	Boston University	NCAA	41	7	23	30	32	—	—	—	—	—
1991–92	Milwaukee Admirals	IHL	80	2	34	36	40	5	1	2	3	2
1992–93	Hamilton Canucks	AHL	78	11	20	31	75	—	—	—	—	—
1993–94	Hamilton Canucks	AHL	80	10	31	41	89	4	1	0	1	2
1994–95	Providence Bruins	AHL	75	6	13	19	93	13	2	4	6	6
1995–96	Providence Bruins	AHL	42	9	21	30	52	—	—	—	—	—
1995–96	Boston Bruins	NHL	27	0	4	4	16	—	—	—	—	—
1996–97	Detroit Vipers	IHL	67	14	26	40	86	21	2	4	6	20
1996–97	Ottawa Senators	NHL	6	0	1	1	7	—	—	—	—	—
1997–98	EHC Chur	NLB	40	10	26	36	75	9	1	3	4	30
1998–99	Frankfurt Lions	DEL	51	4	12	16	75	8	0	0	0	6
1999–00	Krefeld Pinguine	DEL	50	4	7	11	82	4	1	2	3	4
2000–01	Krefeld Pinguine	DEL	59	1	9	10	64	—	—	—	—	—
2001–02	Krefeld Pinguine	DEL	59	0	8	8	30	3	0	1	1	6
2002–03	Hamburg Freezers	DEL	51	1	4	5	55	5	0	0	0	4
2003–04	ERC Ingolstadt	DEL	50	2	9	11	44	9	1	1	2	14
2004–05	ERC Ingolstadt	DEL	47	1	4	5	22	11	0	2	2	10
2005–06	ERC Ingolstadt	DEL	44	2	3	5	38	7	0	0	0	8
NHL totals			33	0	5	5	23	—	—	—	—	—
AHL totals			275	36	85	121	309	17	3	4	7	8
DEL totals			411	15	56	71	410	47	2	6	8	52
