= Trent McCleary =

Canadian ice hockey player

- Born: September 8, 1972 (age 53) Swift Current, Saskatchewan, Canada
- Height: 6 ft 0 in (183 cm)
- Weight: 182 lb (83 kg; 13 st 0 lb)
- Position: Right Wing
- Shot: Right
- Played for: Ottawa Senators; Boston Bruins; Montreal Canadiens
- NHL draft: Undrafted
- Playing career: 1993–2000

Trent Kenneth McCleary (born September 8, 1972) is a Canadian former professional ice hockey player who played for the Ottawa Senators, Boston Bruins, and Montreal Canadiens of the National Hockey League (NHL). His career was ended in 2000 after he took a slapshot to the throat, an injury that required life-saving surgery moments after the incident. He played 192 games, scoring 8 goals and 23 points.

== Playing career ==
=== Early career ===
A native of Swift Current, Saskatchewan, McCleary played junior hockey in the Western Hockey League (WHL) with his hometown Swift Current Broncos beginning in 1988. He played a total of four seasons with the Broncos, winning the WHL championship and Memorial Cup with the team in 1988–89 though he played only three games with the team. He was a defensive forward in the WHL, but scored 50 points in his final year in helping the Broncos win a second championship. He added a goal in four games at the 1993 Memorial Cup.

The Ottawa Senators signed McCleary as an undrafted free agent upon his graduation, and he spent the majority of the 1993–94 season with the Thunder Bay Senators of the Colonial Hockey League (CoHL). He moved up to the Prince Edward Island Senators of the American Hockey League (AHL) in 1994–95 but missed three months of the season after suffering retinal damage to his right eye when he was hit in the face by a stick. Upon his recovery, McCleary returned wearing a visor that he would retain throughout his career.

He made his NHL debut in Ottawa in 1995–96, scoring 14 points in 75 games. The Senators traded McCleary, along with a draft pick, to the Boston Bruins for Shawn McEachern following the season. McCleary appeared in 59 games with the Bruins but was unable to come to an agreement on a new contract for the 1997–98 season. As a result, he signed to play in the International Hockey League (IHL), splitting the season between the Las Vegas Thunder and Detroit Vipers.

His rights ultimately released by the Bruins, McCleary signed with the Montreal Canadiens as a free agent in 1998, appearing in 46 NHL games in 1998–99. Early the following season, he again suffered a severe injury to his right eye, suffering a severed tear duct when he was hit in the face by an errant skate. He recovered, splitting the early part of the season between the Canadiens and the Quebec Citadelles of the AHL.

=== Throat injury and retirement ===
On January 29, 2000, during a game between the Canadiens and the Philadelphia Flyers, McCleary was critically injured when he was hit in the throat by a slapshot by the Flyers' Chris Therien; McCleary had dropped to the ice in order to block the shot. The shot fractured McCleary's larynx and resulted in a collapsed lung. Unable to breathe, he rushed to the bench, collapsing upon his arrival. Medical staff worked to partially open his airway in the hallways of Molson Centre, actions which McCleary credits with saving his life. He was then rushed to a waiting ambulance and transported to hospital, where surgeons performed an emergency tracheotomy. He remained in full equipment during the procedure; hospital staff did not even have time to remove his skates.

Unable to speak immediately following his surgery, McCleary sent a written note to his teammates explaining he was all right while his surgeon revealed that he came "as close ... as you could come" to dying in the moments after he was struck. He met with the media two weeks following his injury, responding to questions via note pad, stating that he hoped to return to his career upon recovery. He regained the ability to talk after six weeks and several surgeries.

McCleary attempted a comeback at the start of the 2000–01 season. Despite doubts he would be capable of returning, the Canadiens signed him to a one-year, US$300,000 contract. He appeared in an exhibition game with the Canadiens, but found he was unable to play a full shift without running short of breath. He was examined by his doctor, who noted that because his air passage was left 15% narrower than before his injury, it was too dangerous for him to continue playing. As a result, on September 20, 2000, McCleary announced his retirement, calling it the "toughest day" in his seven-year career. The Canadiens kept him in the organization, naming him a WHL scout.

== Family ==
McCleary's parents Ken and Leah still live in Swift Current. He has an elder brother, Scott, and a younger sister, Shannon. He and his wife Tammy have three children.

== Career statistics ==
=== Regular season and playoffs ===
			Regular season					Playoffs
Season	Team	League	GP	G	A	Pts	PIM	GP	G	A	Pts	PIM
1988–89	Swift Current Broncos	WHL	3	0	0	0	0	—	—	—	—	—
1989–90	Swift Current Broncos	WHL	70	3	15	18	43	4	1	0	1	0
1990–91	Swift Current Broncos	WHL	70	16	24	40	53	3	0	0	0	2
1991–92	Swift Current Broncos	WHL	72	23	22	45	240	8	1	2	3	16
1992–93	Swift Current Broncos	WHL	63	17	33	50	138	17	5	4	9	16
1992–93	New Haven Senators	AHL	2	1	0	1	6	—	—	—	—	—
1993–94	Prince Edward Island Senators	AHL	4	0	0	0	6	—	—	—	—	—
1993–94	Thunder Bay Senators	CoHL	51	23	17	40	123	9	2	11	13	15
1994–95	Prince Edward Island Senators	AHL	51	9	20	29	60	9	2	3	5	26
1995–96	Ottawa Senators	NHL	75	4	10	14	68	—	—	—	—	—
1996–97	Boston Bruins	NHL	59	3	5	8	33	—	—	—	—	—
1997–98	Las Vegas Thunder	IHL	54	7	6	13	120	3	1	0	1	2
1997–98	Detroit Vipers	IHL	21	1	1	2	45	—	—	—	—	—
1998–99	Montreal Canadiens	NHL	46	0	0	0	29	—	—	—	—	—
1999–00	Montreal Canadiens	NHL	12	1	0	1	4	—	—	—	—	—
1999–00	Quebec Citadelles	AHL	27	7	9	16	56	—	—	—	—	—
NHL totals			192	8	15	23	134	—	—	—	—	—
