= 1996–97 St. Louis Blues season =

National Hockey League team season

1996–97 St. Louis Blues
- Division: 4th Central
- Conference: 6th Western
- 1996–97 record: 36–35–11
- Home record: 17–20–4
- Road record: 19–15–7
- Goals for: 236
- Goals against: 239

Team information
- General manager: Mike Keenan (Oct.–Dec.); Ron Caron (Dec.–Apr.)
- Coach: Mike Keenan (Oct.–Dec.); Jim Roberts (Dec.–Jan.); Joel Quenneville (Jan.–Apr.)
- Captain: Vacant
- Arena: Kiel Center
- Average attendance: 16,806
- Minor league affiliates: Worcester IceCats; Baton Rouge Kingfish

Team leaders
- Goals: Brett Hull (42)
- Assists: Pierre Turgeon (49)
- Points: Brett Hull (82)
- Penalty minutes: Mike Peluso (158)
- Plus/minus: Chris Pronger (+15)
- Wins: Grant Fuhr (33)
- Goals against average: Grant Fuhr (2.72)

The highlight of the 1996–97 St. Louis Blues season marked by significant changes following the departure of Wayne Gretzky. During the season, a public disagreement occurred between Brett Hull and coach Mike Keenan. This season was also the last in which the team featured a large Blue Note logo at center ice until it was reintroduced in early 2009.

== Offseason ==
On July 21, Wayne Gretzky's short tenure with the Blues ended when he signed with the New York Rangers as a free agent, rejoining longtime Oilers teammate Mark Messier.

== Regular season ==
The Blues were in turmoil as an ugly public feud between Brett Hull and Coach Mike Keenan developed, as the Blues got off to a slow start. On December 19 the Keenan era would come to a sudden end as he is fired as GM and Coach. Eventually he would be replaced by assistant coach Jim Roberts.

Roberts' stint as interim head coach lasted nine games, as the team would hire Colorado Avalanche assistant coach Joel Quenneville to serve as the team's head coach. The change worked with Quenneville behind the bench as the Blues recovered and made the playoffs for the 18th straight season with a 36–35–11 record. However, once again the Blues would make a quick exit in the playoffs as they are beaten by the Detroit Red Wings in 6 games.

=== Final standings ===
Central Division
No.	CR		GP	W	L	T	GF	GA	Pts
1	2	**Dallas Stars**	82	48	26	8	252	198	104
2	3	**Detroit Red Wings**	82	38	26	18	253	197	94
3	5	**Phoenix Coyotes**	82	38	37	7	240	243	83
4	6	**St. Louis Blues**	82	36	35	11	236	239	83
5	8	**Chicago Blackhawks**	82	34	35	13	223	210	81
6	11	Toronto Maple Leafs	82	30	44	8	230	273	68

Note: CR = Conference rank; GP = Games played; W = Wins; L = Losses; T = Ties; GF = Goals for; GA = Goals against; Pts = Points
Bolded teams qualified for the playoffs.

Western Conference
R		Div	GP	W	L	T	GF	GA	Pts
**1**	**p – Colorado Avalanche**	**PAC**	**82**	**49**	**24**	**9**	**277**	**205**	**107**
**2**	**Dallas Stars**	**CEN**	**82**	**48**	**26**	**8**	**252**	**198**	**104**
**3**	**Detroit Red Wings**	**CEN**	**82**	**38**	**26**	**18**	**253**	**197**	**94**
**4**	**Mighty Ducks of Anaheim**	**PAC**	**82**	**36**	**33**	**13**	**245**	**233**	**85**
**5**	**Phoenix Coyotes**	**CEN**	**82**	**38**	**37**	**7**	**240**	**243**	**83**
**6**	**St. Louis Blues**	**CEN**	**82**	**36**	**35**	**11**	**236**	**239**	**83**
**7**	**Edmonton Oilers**	**PAC**	**82**	**36**	**37**	**9**	**252**	**247**	**81**
**8**	**Chicago Blackhawks**	**CEN**	**82**	**34**	**35**	**13**	**223**	**210**	**81**
9	Vancouver Canucks	PAC	82	35	40	7	257	273	77
10	Calgary Flames	PAC	82	32	41	9	214	239	73
11	Toronto Maple Leafs	CEN	82	30	44	8	230	273	68
12	Los Angeles Kings	PAC	82	28	43	11	214	268	67
13	San Jose Sharks	PAC	82	27	47	8	211	278	62

Divisions: CEN – Central, PAC – Pacific

bold – Qualified for playoffs; p – Won Presidents' Trophy

== Playoffs ==
The Blues lost 4 games to 2 to the Detroit Red Wings, the eventual Stanley Cup champions, in the first round.

== Schedule and results ==
=== Regular season ===
1996–97 regular season
October: 5–7–0 (home: 2–3–0; road: 3–4–0)

Game	Date	Score	Opponent	Record	Recap
1	October 4, 1996	4–2	Colorado Avalanche (1996–97)	1–0–0	W
2	October 6, 1996	1–4	Chicago Blackhawks (1996–97)	1–1–0	L
3	October 9, 1996	3–1	@ Calgary Flames (1996–97)	2–1–0	W
4	October 11, 1996	3–1	@ Edmonton Oilers (1996–97)	3–1–0	W
5	October 12, 1996	3–5	@ Vancouver Canucks (1996–97)	3–2–0	L
6	October 17, 1996	6–1	Toronto Maple Leafs (1996–97)	4–2–0	W
7	October 18, 1996	1–2	@ New York Rangers (1996–97)	4–3–0	L
8	October 20, 1996	2–3	San Jose Sharks (1996–97)	4–4–0	L
9	October 22, 1996	2–1	@ Phoenix Coyotes (1996–97)	5–4–0	W
10	October 24, 1996	4–6	@ Chicago Blackhawks (1996–97)	5–5–0	L
11	October 26, 1996	4–6	Washington Capitals (1996–97)	5–6–0	L
12	October 30, 1996	3–6	@ Colorado Avalanche (1996–97)	5–7–0	L

November: 8–4–0 (home: 5–2–0; road: 3–2–0)

Game	Date	Score	Opponent	Record	Recap
13	November 1, 1996	2–4	Buffalo Sabres (1996–97)	5–8–0	L
14	November 3, 1996	6–3	Dallas Stars (1996–97)	6–8–0	W
15	November 5, 1996	3–6	@ Toronto Maple Leafs (1996–97)	6–9–0	L
16	November 8, 1996	4–2	@ Vancouver Canucks (1996–97)	7–9–0	W
17	November 9, 1996	3–2	@ Calgary Flames (1996–97)	8–9–0	W
18	November 14, 1996	5–3	Tampa Bay Lightning (1996–97)	9–9–0	W
19	November 16, 1996	2–0	Calgary Flames (1996–97)	10–9–0	W
20	November 17, 1996	4–2	Mighty Ducks of Anaheim (1996–97)	11–9–0	W
21	November 19, 1996	2–4	@ Pittsburgh Penguins (1996–97)	11–10–0	L
22	November 21, 1996	4–3 OT	Phoenix Coyotes (1996–97)	12–10–0	W
23	November 23, 1996	1–3	Florida Panthers (1996–97)	12–11–0	L
24	November 27, 1996	3–2	@ Mighty Ducks of Anaheim (1996–97)	13–11–0	W

December: 4–9–2 (home: 2–6–0; road: 2–3–2)

Game	Date	Score	Opponent	Record	Recap
25	December 1, 1996	3–4	San Jose Sharks (1996–97)	13–12–0	L
26	December 3, 1996	0–2	@ Toronto Maple Leafs (1996–97)	13–13–0	L
27	December 5, 1996	0–3	Phoenix Coyotes (1996–97)	13–14–0	L
28	December 6, 1996	4–3	@ Colorado Avalanche (1996–97)	14–14–0	W
29	December 8, 1996	3–2	@ Edmonton Oilers (1996–97)	15–14–0	W
30	December 11, 1996	5–5 OT	@ Dallas Stars (1996–97)	15–14–1	T
31	December 13, 1996	1–4	Chicago Blackhawks (1996–97)	15–15–1	L
32	December 15, 1996	0–8	Vancouver Canucks (1996–97)	15–16–1	L
33	December 17, 1996	3–5	@ Hartford Whalers (1996–97)	15–17–1	L
34	December 19, 1996	0–4	Pittsburgh Penguins (1996–97)	15–18–1	L
35	December 21, 1996	0–4	@ Philadelphia Flyers (1996–97)	15–19–1	L
36	December 22, 1996	7–4	Los Angeles Kings (1996–97)	16–19–1	W
37	December 26, 1996	4–4 OT	@ Chicago Blackhawks (1996–97)	16–19–2	T
38	December 27, 1996	2–3	Toronto Maple Leafs (1996–97)	16–20–2	L
39	December 29, 1996	4–2	Boston Bruins (1996–97)	17–20–2	W

January: 8–3–2 (home: 1–2–1; road: 7–1–1)

Game	Date	Score	Opponent	Record	Recap
40	January 2, 1997	2–2 OT	Montreal Canadiens (1996–97)	17–20–3	T
41	January 3, 1997	2–2 OT	@ Buffalo Sabres (1996–97)	17–20–4	T
42	January 5, 1997	5–3	@ New Jersey Devils (1996–97)	18–20–4	W
43	January 7, 1997	2–5	Edmonton Oilers (1996–97)	18–21–4	L
44	January 9, 1997	4–3	@ San Jose Sharks (1996–97)	19–21–4	W
45	January 11, 1997	1–2	@ Los Angeles Kings (1996–97)	19–22–4	L
46	January 15, 1997	4–1	@ Phoenix Coyotes (1996–97)	20–22–4	W
47	January 20, 1997	6–4	@ New York Islanders (1996–97)	21–22–4	W
48	January 23, 1997	4–3	Vancouver Canucks (1996–97)	22–22–4	W
49	January 25, 1997	8–1	@ Montreal Canadiens (1996–97)	23–22–4	W
50	January 27, 1997	1–4	Mighty Ducks of Anaheim (1996–97)	23–23–4	L
51	January 29, 1997	4–0	@ Toronto Maple Leafs (1996–97)	24–23–4	W
52	January 30, 1997	5–2	@ Ottawa Senators (1996–97)	25–23–4	W

February: 3–6–4 (home: 3–4–2; road: 0–2–2)

Game	Date	Score	Opponent	Record	Recap
53	February 1, 1997	1–4	Detroit Red Wings (1996–97)	25–24–4	L
54	February 4, 1997	1–1 OT	@ Detroit Red Wings (1996–97)	25–24–5	T
55	February 6, 1997	6–4	Dallas Stars (1996–97)	26–24–5	W
56	February 8, 1997	3–3 OT	@ Boston Bruins (1996–97)	26–24–6	T
57	February 10, 1997	2–4	Phoenix Coyotes (1996–97)	26–25–6	L
58	February 13, 1997	4–1	New York Rangers (1996–97)	27–25–6	W
59	February 15, 1997	2–5	Colorado Avalanche (1996–97)	27–26–6	L
60	February 17, 1997	4–2	Chicago Blackhawks (1996–97)	28–26–6	W
61	February 20, 1997	1–1 OT	Ottawa Senators (1996–97)	28–26–7	T
62	February 22, 1997	2–2 OT	Detroit Red Wings (1996–97)	28–26–8	T
63	February 23, 1997	3–5	Calgary Flames (1996–97)	28–27–8	L
64	February 25, 1997	2–3	@ Tampa Bay Lightning (1996–97)	28–28–8	L
65	February 27, 1997	2–3 OT	@ Florida Panthers (1996–97)	28–29–8	L

March: 5–5–1 (home: 3–2–0; road: 2–3–1)

Game	Date	Score	Opponent	Record	Recap
66	March 5, 1997	2–3	@ Dallas Stars (1996–97)	28–30–8	L
67	March 9, 1997	1–4	Edmonton Oilers (1996–97)	28–31–8	L
68	March 11, 1997	4–3	@ San Jose Sharks (1996–97)	29–31–8	W
69	March 13, 1997	4–2	@ Los Angeles Kings (1996–97)	30–31–8	W
70	March 14, 1997	4–4 OT	@ Mighty Ducks of Anaheim (1996–97)	30–31–9	T
71	March 17, 1997	2–3	@ Phoenix Coyotes (1996–97)	30–32–9	L
72	March 20, 1997	4–1	Hartford Whalers (1996–97)	31–32–9	W
73	March 23, 1997	1–4	Dallas Stars (1996–97)	31–33–9	L
74	March 25, 1997	2–3	@ Washington Capitals (1996–97)	31–34–9	L
75	March 27, 1997	2–1	Los Angeles Kings (1996–97)	32–34–9	W
76	March 30, 1997	3–2	Philadelphia Flyers (1996–97)	33–34–9	W

April: 3–1–2 (home: 1–1–1; road: 2–0–1)

Game	Date	Score	Opponent	Record	Recap
77	April 1, 1997	1–1 OT	@ Detroit Red Wings (1996–97)	33–34–10	T
78	April 3, 1997	5–5 OT	New York Islanders (1996–97)	33–34–11	T
79	April 6, 1997	0–2	New Jersey Devils (1996–97)	33–35–11	L
80	April 9, 1997	1–0	@ Chicago Blackhawks (1996–97)	34–35–11	W
81	April 10, 1997	5–1	Toronto Maple Leafs (1996–97)	35–35–11	W
82	April 13, 1997	3–1	@ Detroit Red Wings (1996–97)	36–35–11	W

Legend: W Win (2 points) L Loss (0 points) T Tie (1 point)

=== Playoffs ===
1997 Stanley Cup playoffs
Western Conference Quarterfinals vs. (3) Detroit Red Wings: Red Wings win 4–2

Game	Date	Score	Opponent	Series	Recap
1	April 16, 1997	2–0	@ Detroit Red Wings	Blues lead 1–0	W
2	April 18, 1997	1–2	@ Detroit Red Wings	Series tied 1–1	L
3	April 20, 1997	2–3	Detroit Red Wings	Red Wings lead 2–1	L
4	April 22, 1997	4–0	Detroit Red Wings	Series tied 2–2	W
5	April 25, 1997	2–5	@ Detroit Red Wings	Red Wings lead 3–2	L
6	April 27, 1997	1–3	Detroit Red Wings	Red Wings win 4–2	L

Legend: W Win L Loss

== Player statistics ==
=== Scoring ===
- Position abbreviations: C = Center; D = Defense; G = Goaltender; LW = Left wing; RW = Right wing
- † = Joined team via a transaction (e.g., trade, waivers, signing) during the season. Stats reflect time with the Blues only.
- ‡ = Left team via a transaction (e.g., trade, waivers, release) during the season. Stats reflect time with the Blues only.

No.	Player	Pos	Regular season						Playoffs					
No.	Player	Pos	GP	G	A	Pts	+/-	PIM	GP	G	A	Pts	+/-	PIM
16	Brett Hull	RW	77	42	40	82	−9	10	6	2	7	9	4	2
77	Pierre Turgeon†	C	69	25	49	74	4	12	5	1	1	2	0	2
14	Geoff Courtnall	LW	82	17	40	57	3	86	6	3	1	4	0	23
17 (Note: Murphy wore number 21 in his first seven games.)	Joe Murphy	RW	75	20	25	45	−1	69	6	1	1	2	−2	10
10	Jim Campbell	RW	68	23	20	43	3	68	4	1	0	1	−1	6
2	Al MacInnis	D	72	13	30	43	2	65	6	1	2	3	−1	4
32	Stephane Matteau	LW	74	16	20	36	11	50	5	0	0	0	0	0
44	Chris Pronger	D	79	11	24	35	15	143	6	1	1	2	0	22
37	Harry York	C	74	14	18	32	1	24	5	0	0	0	−1	2
5	Igor Kravchuk	D	82	4	24	28	7	35	2	0	0	0	−1	2
36	Robert Petrovicky	C	44	7	12	19	2	10	2	0	0	0	1	0
39 (Note: Pellerin wore number 36 in his first game and number 12 in his second game.)	Scott Pellerin	LW	54	8	10	18	12	35	6	0	0	0	−1	6
22	Craig Conroy†	C	61	6	11	17	0	43	6	0	0	0	−1	8
25	Peter Zezel‡	C	35	4	9	13	6	12	—	—	—	—	—	—
28	Ricard Persson†	D	53	4	8	12	−2	45	6	0	0	0	−1	27
23	Craig MacTavish	C	50	2	5	7	−12	33	1	0	0	0	−1	2
28	Brian Noonan‡	RW	13	2	5	7	2	0	—	—	—	—	—	—
6	Jamie Rivers	D	15	2	5	7	−4	6	—	—	—	—	—	—
43	Libor Zabransky	D	34	1	5	6	−1	44	—	—	—	—	—	—
20	Mike Peluso†	LW	44	2	3	5	0	158	5	0	0	0	−1	25
26	Sergio Momesso†	LW	31	1	3	4	−4	37	3	0	0	0	0	6
4	Marc Bergevin	D	82	0	4	4	−9	53	6	1	0	1	2	8
38	Pavol Demitra†	LW	8	3	0	3	0	2	6	1	3	4	3	6
9	Shayne Corson‡	LW	11	2	1	3	−4	24	—	—	—	—	—	—
27	Steve Leach	RW	17	2	1	3	−2	24	6	0	0	0	−2	33
26	Konstantin Shafranov	RW	5	2	1	3	1	0	—	—	—	—	—	—
12	Rob Pearson	RW	18	1	2	3	−5	37	—	—	—	—	—	—
18	Tony Twist	LW	64	1	2	3	−8	121	6	0	0	0	0	0
34	Murray Baron‡	D	11	0	2	2	−4	11	—	—	—	—	—	—
31	Grant Fuhr	G	73	0	2	2		6	6	0	0	0		4
33	Trent Yawney	D	39	0	2	2	2	17	—	—	—	—	—	—
13	Yuri Khmylev	LW	2	1	0	1	−1	2	—	—	—	—	—	—
38	Gary Leeman	RW	2	0	1	1	0	0	—	—	—	—	—	—
21	Jamal Mayers	RW	6	0	1	1	−3	2	—	—	—	—	—	—
35	Christer Olsson‡	D	5	0	1	1	1	0	—	—	—	—	—	—
30	Jon Casey	G	15	0	0	0		0	—	—	—	—	—	—
42	Rory Fitzpatrick†	D	2	0	0	0	−2	2	—	—	—	—	—	—
19	Chris McAlpine†	D	15	0	0	0	−2	24	4	0	1	1	1	0
15	Alexander Vasilevski	RW	3	0	0	0	−1	2	—	—	—	—	—	—

=== Goaltending ===
No.	Player	Regular season										Playoffs								
No.	Player	GP	W	L	T	SA	GA	GAA	SV%	SO	TOI	GP	W	L	SA	GA	GAA	SV%	SO	TOI
31	Grant Fuhr	73	33	27	11	1940	193	2.72	.901	3	4261	6	2	4	183	13	2.18	.929	2	357
30	Jon Casey	15	3	8	0	299	40	3.40	.866	0	707	—	—	—	—	—	—	—	—	—

== Awards and records ==
=== Awards ===
Type	Award/honor	Recipient	Ref
League (annual)	NHL All-Rookie Team	Jim Campbell (Forward)	
League (in-season)	NHL All-Star Game selection	Brett Hull (Note: Hull was voted to the starting lineup.)	
League (in-season)	NHL All-Star Game selection	Al MacInnis	
League (in-season)	NHL Rookie of the Month	Jim Campbell (October)	
League (in-season)	NHL Rookie of the Month	Harry York (November)	

=== Milestones ===
Milestone	Player	Date	Ref
First game	Harry York	October 4, 1996	
First game	Konstantin Shafranov	October 6, 1996	
First game	Libor Zabransky	October 18, 1996	
First game	Jamal Mayers	November 3, 1996	

== Draft picks ==
St. Louis's draft picks at the 1996 NHL entry draft held at the Kiel Center in St. Louis, Missouri.

Round	#	Player	Nationality	College/Junior/Club team (League)
1	14	Marty Reasoner	United States	Boston College (Hockey East)
3	67	Gordie Dwyer	Canada	Beauport Harfangs (QMJHL)
4	95	Jon Zukiwsky	Canada	Red Deer Rebels (WHL)
4	97	Andrei Petrakov	Russia	Avtomobilist Yekaterinburg (Russia)
6	159	Stephen Wagner	Canada	Olds Grizzlys (AJHL)
7	169	Daniel Corso	Canada	Victoriaville Tigres (QMJHL)
7	177	Reed Low	Canada	Moose Jaw Warriors (WHL)
8	196	Andrej Podkonicky	Slovakia	ZTK Zvolen (Slovakia)
8	203	Anthony Hutchins	United States	Lawrence Academy (USHS–MA)
9	229	Konstantin Shafranov	Kazakhstan	Fort Wayne Komets (IHL)

== See also ==
- 1996–97 NHL season
