= 1996–97 Colorado Avalanche season =

National Hockey League team season

1996–97 Colorado Avalanche
- Presidents' Trophy winners
- Pacific Division champions
- Division: 1st Pacific
- Conference: 1st Western
- 1996–97 record: 49–24–9
- Home record: 26–10–5
- Road record: 23–14–4
- Goals for: 277
- Goals against: 205

Team information
- General manager: Pierre Lacroix
- Coach: Marc Crawford
- Captain: Joe Sakic
- Arena: McNichols Arena
- Average attendance: 16,061
- Minor league affiliate: Hershey Bears

Team leaders
- Goals: Adam Deadmarsh (33)
- Assists: Peter Forsberg (58)
- Points: Peter Forsberg (86)
- Penalty minutes: Brent Severyn (193)
- Plus/minus: Peter Forsberg (+31)
- Wins: Patrick Roy (38)
- Goals against average: Patrick Roy (2.32)

The 1996–97 Colorado Avalanche season was the Avalanche's second season. The franchise's 18th season in the National Hockey League and 25th season overall.

== Regular season ==
The Avalanche scored the most power-play goals during the regular season, with 83. And the most in the Western Conference with 277 goals.

=== Season standings ===
Pacific Division
No.	CR		GP	W	L	T	GF	GA	Pts
1	1	**Colorado Avalanche**	82	49	24	9	277	205	107
2	4	**Mighty Ducks of Anaheim**	82	36	33	13	243	231	85
3	7	**Edmonton Oilers**	82	36	37	9	252	247	81
4	9	Vancouver Canucks	82	35	40	7	257	273	77
5	10	Calgary Flames	82	32	41	9	214	239	73
6	12	Los Angeles Kings	82	28	43	11	214	268	67
7	13	San Jose Sharks	82	27	47	8	211	278	62

Note: CR = Conference rank; GP = Games played; W = Wins; L = Losses; T = Ties; GF = Goals for; GA = Goals against; Pts = Points
Bolded teams qualified for the playoffs.

Western Conference
R		Div	GP	W	L	T	GF	GA	Pts
**1**	**p – Colorado Avalanche**	**PAC**	**82**	**49**	**24**	**9**	**277**	**205**	**107**
**2**	**Dallas Stars**	**CEN**	**82**	**48**	**26**	**8**	**252**	**198**	**104**
**3**	**Detroit Red Wings**	**CEN**	**82**	**38**	**26**	**18**	**253**	**197**	**94**
**4**	**Mighty Ducks of Anaheim**	**PAC**	**82**	**36**	**33**	**13**	**245**	**233**	**85**
**5**	**Phoenix Coyotes**	**CEN**	**82**	**38**	**37**	**7**	**240**	**243**	**83**
**6**	**St. Louis Blues**	**CEN**	**82**	**36**	**35**	**11**	**236**	**239**	**83**
**7**	**Edmonton Oilers**	**PAC**	**82**	**36**	**37**	**9**	**252**	**247**	**81**
**8**	**Chicago Blackhawks**	**CEN**	**82**	**34**	**35**	**13**	**223**	**210**	**81**
9	Vancouver Canucks	PAC	82	35	40	7	257	273	77
10	Calgary Flames	PAC	82	32	41	9	214	239	73
11	Toronto Maple Leafs	CEN	82	30	44	8	230	273	68
12	Los Angeles Kings	PAC	82	28	43	11	214	268	67
13	San Jose Sharks	PAC	82	27	47	8	211	278	62

Divisions: CEN – Central, PAC – Pacific

bold – Qualified for playoffs; p – Won Presidents' Trophy

== Playoffs ==
- April 24, 1997: Patrick Roy shut out Chicago by a score of 7-0. He earned his 89th postseason victory and became the goalie with the most postseason wins, surpassing the old record set by New York Islanders goalie Billy Smith.

== Schedule and results ==
=== Regular season ===
1996–97 regular season
October: 8–4–1 (home: 5–1–1; road: 3–3–0)

Game	Date	Score	Opponent	Record	Recap
1	October 4, 1996	2–4	@ St. Louis Blues (1996–97)	0–1–0	L
2	October 5, 1996	1–4	@ Dallas Stars (1996–97)	0–2–0	L
3	October 8, 1996	6–0	San Jose Sharks (1996–97)	1–2–0	W
4	October 10, 1996	6–6 OT	Mighty Ducks of Anaheim (1996–97)	1–2–1	T
5	October 11, 1996	2–0	@ Chicago Blackhawks (1996–97)	2–2–1	W
6	October 15, 1996	7–2	Edmonton Oilers (1996–97)	3–2–1	W
7	October 17, 1996	1–2	Florida Panthers (1996–97)	3–3–1	L
8	October 19, 1996	9–2	Vancouver Canucks (1996–97)	4–3–1	W
9	October 22, 1996	1–5	@ Calgary Flames (1996–97)	4–4–1	L
10	October 23, 1996	4–1	@ Vancouver Canucks (1996–97)	5–4–1	W
11	October 26, 1996	4–2	@ Edmonton Oilers (1996–97)	6–4–1	W
12	October 28, 1996	1–0	Washington Capitals (1996–97)	7–4–1	W
13	October 30, 1996	6–3	St. Louis Blues (1996–97)	8–4–1	W

November: 8–2–3 (home: 4–1–2; road: 4–1–1)

Game	Date	Score	Opponent	Record	Recap
14	November 2, 1996	0–0 OT	Buffalo Sabres (1996–97)	8–4–2	T
15	November 3, 1996	1–1 OT	@ Mighty Ducks of Anaheim (1996–97)	8–4–3	T
16	November 6, 1996	4–1	@ San Jose Sharks (1996–97)	9–4–3	W
17	November 8, 1996	4–1	@ Phoenix Coyotes (1996–97)	10–4–3	W
18	November 9, 1996	5–2	Montreal Canadiens (1996–97)	11–4–3	W
19	November 11, 1996	6–2	@ New York Islanders (1996–97)	12–4–3	W
20	November 13, 1996	4–1	@ Detroit Red Wings (1996–97)	13–4–3	W
21	November 14, 1996	4–5	@ Buffalo Sabres (1996–97)	13–5–3	L
22	November 16, 1996	4–4 OT	Hartford Whalers (1996–97)	13–5–4	T
23	November 20, 1996	6–0	Phoenix Coyotes (1996–97)	14–5–4	W
24	November 22, 1996	3–2	New York Islanders (1996–97)	15–5–4	W
25	November 27, 1996	2–5	New York Rangers (1996–97)	15–6–4	L
26	November 30, 1996	2–1	New Jersey Devils (1996–97)	16–6–4	W

December: 7–4–1 (home: 4–2–0; road: 3–2–1)

Game	Date	Score	Opponent	Record	Recap
27	December 4, 1996	2–0	Edmonton Oilers (1996–97)	17–6–4	W
28	December 6, 1996	3–4	St. Louis Blues (1996–97)	17–7–4	L
29	December 7, 1996	2–4	@ Los Angeles Kings (1996–97)	17–8–4	L
30	December 11, 1996	6–1	@ Vancouver Canucks (1996–97)	18–8–4	W
31	December 14, 1996	1–4	@ Calgary Flames (1996–97)	18–9–4	L
32	December 17, 1996	4–3	Detroit Red Wings (1996–97)	19–9–4	W
33	December 18, 1996	4–4 OT	@ Edmonton Oilers (1996–97)	19–9–5	T
34	December 21, 1996	2–6	Toronto Maple Leafs (1996–97)	19–10–5	L
35	December 23, 1996	4–3	Calgary Flames (1996–97)	20–10–5	W
36	December 28, 1996	5–2	@ Los Angeles Kings (1996–97)	21–10–5	W
37	December 29, 1996	3–2	Dallas Stars (1996–97)	22–10–5	W
38	December 31, 1996	4–1	@ Chicago Blackhawks (1996–97)	23–10–5	W

January: 8–2–3 (home: 3–0–1; road: 5–2–2)

Game	Date	Score	Opponent	Record	Recap
39	January 2, 1997	3–2	Calgary Flames (1996–97)	24–10–5	W
40	January 4, 1997	4–4 OT	Philadelphia Flyers (1996–97)	24–10–6	T
41	January 6, 1997	2–2 OT	@ New York Rangers (1996–97)	24–10–7	T
42	January 8, 1997	1–1 OT	@ New Jersey Devils (1996–97)	24–10–8	T
43	January 9, 1997	2–0	@ Ottawa Senators (1996–97)	25–10–8	W
44	January 11, 1997	3–2	@ Toronto Maple Leafs (1996–97)	26–10–8	W
45	January 15, 1997	4–2	Tampa Bay Lightning (1996–97)	27–10–8	W
46	January 20, 1997	4–2	@ Florida Panthers (1996–97)	28–10–8	W
47	January 21, 1997	2–3 OT	@ Tampa Bay Lightning (1996–97)	28–11–8	L
48	January 23, 1997	4–3 OT	@ Pittsburgh Penguins (1996–97)	29–11–8	W
49	January 25, 1997	1–4	@ Boston Bruins (1996–97)	29–12–8	L
50	January 27, 1997	5–2	@ Toronto Maple Leafs (1996–97)	30–12–8	W
51	January 29, 1997	6–3	Los Angeles Kings (1996–97)	31–12–8	W

February: 7–4–0 (home: 3–2–0; road: 4–2–0)

Game	Date	Score	Opponent	Record	Recap
52	February 1, 1997	1–2	@ San Jose Sharks (1996–97)	31–13–8	L
53	February 2, 1997	5–2	@ Mighty Ducks of Anaheim (1996–97)	32–13–8	W
54	February 8, 1997	2–4	Chicago Blackhawks (1996–97)	32–14–8	L
55	February 11, 1997	3–1	Los Angeles Kings (1996–97)	33–14–8	W
56	February 13, 1997	3–2	@ Phoenix Coyotes (1996–97)	34–14–8	W
57	February 15, 1997	5–2	@ St. Louis Blues (1996–97)	35–14–8	W
58	February 18, 1997	3–2 OT	Boston Bruins (1996–97)	36–14–8	W
59	February 21, 1997	4–3 OT	@ Edmonton Oilers (1996–97)	37–14–8	W
60	February 23, 1997	4–3	Ottawa Senators (1996–97)	38–14–8	W
61	February 25, 1997	1–3	@ Los Angeles Kings (1996–97)	38–15–8	L
62	February 27, 1997	2–6	Dallas Stars (1996–97)	38–16–8	L

March: 8–5–1 (home: 6–2–1; road: 2–3–0)

Game	Date	Score	Opponent	Record	Recap
63	March 1, 1997	2–1	Chicago Blackhawks (1996–97)	39–16–8	W
64	March 3, 1997	5–1	Vancouver Canucks (1996–97)	40–16–8	W
65	March 5, 1997	7–3	@ Montreal Canadiens (1996–97)	41–16–8	W
66	March 6, 1997	3–6	@ Washington Capitals (1996–97)	41–17–8	L
67	March 9, 1997	2–2 OT	Mighty Ducks of Anaheim (1996–97)	41–17–9	T
68	March 12, 1997	2–3	Calgary Flames (1996–97)	41–18–9	L
69	March 14, 1997	6–3	Pittsburgh Penguins (1996–97)	42–18–9	W
70	March 16, 1997	4–2	Detroit Red Wings (1996–97)	43–18–9	W
71	March 18, 1997	4–2	Vancouver Canucks (1996–97)	44–18–9	W
72	March 21, 1997	4–3	Mighty Ducks of Anaheim (1996–97)	45–18–9	W
73	March 23, 1997	0–2	@ Philadelphia Flyers (1996–97)	45–19–9	L
74	March 25, 1997	4–0	@ Hartford Whalers (1996–97)	46–19–9	W
75	March 26, 1997	5–6 OT	@ Detroit Red Wings (1996–97)	46–20–9	L
76	March 29, 1997	2–3	Toronto Maple Leafs (1996–97)	46–21–9	L

April: 3–3–0 (home: 1–2–0; road: 2–1–0)

Game	Date	Score	Opponent	Record	Recap
77	April 2, 1997	5–1	@ Calgary Flames (1996–97)	47–21–9	W
78	April 4, 1997	6–7 OT	@ San Jose Sharks (1996–97)	47–22–9	L
79	April 6, 1997	2–1	Phoenix Coyotes (1996–97)	48–22–9	W
80	April 9, 1997	1–4	San Jose Sharks (1996–97)	48–23–9	L
81	April 11, 1997	2–1	@ Dallas Stars (1996–97)	49–23–9	W
82	April 13, 1997	2–4	Los Angeles Kings (1996–97)	49–24–9	L

Legend: W Win (2 points) L Loss (0 points) T Tie (1 point)

=== Playoffs ===
1997 Stanley Cup playoffs
Western Conference Quarterfinals vs. (8) Chicago Blackhawks – Avalanche win 4–2

Game	Date	Score	Opponent	Series	Recap
1	April 16, 1997	6–0	Chicago Blackhawks	Avalanche lead 1–0	W
2	April 18, 1997	3–1	Chicago Blackhawks	Avalanche lead 2–0	W
3	April 20, 1997	3–4 2OT	@ Chicago Blackhawks	Avalanche lead 2–1	L
4	April 22, 1997	3–6	@ Chicago Blackhawks	Series tied 2–2	L
5	April 24, 1997	7–0	Chicago Blackhawks	Avalanche lead 3–2	W
6	April 26, 1997	6–3	@ Chicago Blackhawks	Avalanche win 4–2	W

Western Conference Semifinals vs. (7) Edmonton Oilers – Avalanche win 4–1

Game	Date	Score	Opponent	Series	Recap
1	May 2, 1997	5–1	Edmonton Oilers	Avalanche lead 1–0	W
2	May 4, 1997	4–1	Edmonton Oilers	Avalanche lead 2–0	W
3	May 7, 1997	3–4	@ Edmonton Oilers	Avalanche lead 2–1	L
4	May 9, 1997	3–2 OT	@ Edmonton Oilers	Avalanche lead 3–1	W
5	May 11, 1997	4–3	Edmonton Oilers	Avalanche win 4–1	W

Western Conference Finals vs. (3) Detroit Red Wings – Red Wings win 4–2

Game	Date	Score	Opponent	Series	Recap
1	May 15, 1997	2–1	Detroit Red Wings	Avalanche lead 1–0	W
2	May 17, 1997	2–4	Detroit Red Wings	Series tied 1–1	L
3	May 19, 1997	1–2	@ Detroit Red Wings	Red Wings lead 2–1	L
4	May 22, 1997	0–6	@ Detroit Red Wings	Red Wings lead 3–1	L
5	May 24, 1997	6–0	Detroit Red Wings	Red Wings lead 3–2	W
6	May 26, 1997	1–3	@ Detroit Red Wings	Red Wings win 4–2	L

Legend: W Win L Loss

== Player statistics ==
=== Scoring ===
- Position abbreviations: C = Center; D = Defense; G = Goaltender; LW = Left wing; RW = Right wing
- † = Joined team via a transaction (e.g., trade, waivers, signing) during the season. Stats reflect time with the Avalanche only.
- ‡ = Left team via a transaction (e.g., trade, waivers, release) during the season. Stats reflect time with the Avalanche only.

No.	Player	Pos	Regular season						Playoffs					
No.	Player	Pos	GP	G	A	Pts	+/-	PIM	GP	G	A	Pts	+/-	PIM
21	Peter Forsberg	C	65	28	58	86	31	73	14	5	12	17	−6	10
19	Joe Sakic	C	65	22	52	74	−10	34	17	8	17	25	5	14
8	Sandis Ozolinsh	D	80	23	45	68	4	88	17	4	13	17	−1	24
13	Valeri Kamensky	LW	68	28	38	66	5	38	17	8	14	22	−1	16
18	Adam Deadmarsh	RW	78	33	27	60	8	136	17	3	6	9	−6	24
11	Keith Jones†	RW	67	23	20	43	5	105	6	3	3	6	2	4
48	Scott Young	RW	72	18	19	37	−5	14	17	4	2	6	−1	14
28	Eric Lacroix	LW	81	18	18	36	16	26	17	1	4	5	2	19
9	Mike Ricci	C	63	13	19	32	−3	59	17	2	4	6	1	17
22	Claude Lemieux	RW	45	11	17	28	−4	43	17	13	10	23	7	32
20	Rene Corbet	LW	76	12	15	27	14	67	17	2	2	4	0	27
25	Mike Keane	RW	81	10	17	27	2	63	17	3	1	4	2	24
26	Stephane Yelle	C	79	9	17	26	1	38	12	1	6	7	5	2
24	Jon Klemm	D	80	9	15	24	12	37	17	1	1	2	−1	6
4	Uwe Krupp	D	60	4	17	21	12	48	—	—	—	—	—	—
52	Adam Foote	D	78	2	19	21	16	135	17	0	4	4	3	62
3	Aaron Miller	D	56	5	12	17	15	15	17	1	2	3	3	10
5	Alexei Gusarov	D	58	2	12	14	4	28	17	0	3	3	3	14
2	Sylvain Lefebvre	D	71	2	11	13	12	30	17	0	0	0	−1	25
23	Brent Severyn	LW	66	1	4	5	−6	193	8	0	0	0	1	12
7	Curtis Leschyshyn‡	D	11	0	5	5	1	6	—	—	—	—	—	—
15	Yves Sarault	LW	28	2	1	3	0	6	5	0	0	0	0	2
17	Landon Wilson‡	RW	9	1	2	3	1	23	—	—	—	—	—	—
27	Christian Matte	RW	5	1	1	2	1	0	—	—	—	—	—	—
1	Craig Billington	G	23	0	2	2		2	1	0	0	0		0
10	Josef Marha	C	6	0	1	1	0	0	—	—	—	—	—	—
33	Patrick Roy	G	62	0	1	1		15	17	0	0	0		12
6	Wade Belak	D	5	0	0	0	−1	11	—	—	—	—	—	—
32	Rich Brennan	D	2	0	0	0	0	0	—	—	—	—	—	—
30	Marc Denis	G	1	0	0	0		0	—	—	—	—	—	—
29	Eric Messier	LW	21	0	0	0	7	4	6	0	0	0	0	4

=== Goaltending ===
No.	Player	Regular season										Playoffs								
No.	Player	GP	W	L	T	SA	GA	GAA	SV%	SO	TOI	GP	W	L	SA	GA	GAA	SV%	SO	TOI
33	Patrick Roy	62	38	15	7	1861	143	2.32	.923	7	3698	17	10	7	559	38	2.21	.932	3	1034
1	Craig Billington	23	11	8	2	584	53	2.65	.909	1	1200	1	0	0	13	1	3.00	.923	0	20
30	Marc Denis	1	0	1	0	26	3	3.02	.885	0	60	—	—	—	—	—	—	—	—	—

== Awards and records ==
=== Awards ===
Type	Award/honor	Recipient	Ref
League (annual)	NHL First All-Star Team	Sandis Ozolinsh (Defense)	
League (in-season)	NHL All-Star Game selection	Peter Forsberg (Note: Forsberg did not play and was replaced by Brendan Shanahan of the Detroit Red Wings.)	
League (in-season)	NHL All-Star Game selection	Sandis Ozolinsh (Note: Ozolinsh, Roy, and Sakic were voted to the starting lineup. Sakic did not play and was replaced by Teemu Selanne of the Mighty Ducks of Anaheim.)	
League (in-season)	NHL All-Star Game selection	Patrick Roy	
League (in-season)	NHL All-Star Game selection	Joe Sakic	

=== Milestones ===
Milestone	Player	Date	Ref
First game	Eric Messier	November 11, 1996	
First game	Marc Denis	December 7, 1996	
First game	Christian Matte	December 18, 1996	
First game	Wade Belak	December 21, 1996	
First game	Rich Brennan	January 6, 1997	

== Draft picks ==
Colorado's draft picks at the 1996 NHL entry draft held at the Kiel Center in St. Louis, Missouri.

Round	#	Player	Nationality	College/Junior/Club team (League)
1	25	Peter Ratchuk	United States	Shattuck-Saint Mary's (USHS-MN)
2	51	Yuri Babenko	Russia	Krylya Sovetov (Russia)
3	79	Mark Parrish	United States	St. Cloud State University (WCHA)
4	98	Ben Storey	Canada	Harvard University (ECAC)
4	107	Randy Petruk	Canada	Kamloops Blazers (WHL)
5	134	Luke Curtin	United States	Kelowna Rockets (WHL)
6	146	Brian Willsie	Canada	Guelph Storm (OHL)
6	160	Kai Fischer	Germany	Dusseldorfer EG (Germany)
7	167	Dan Hinote	United States	United States Military Academy (NCAA Independent)
7	176	Samuel Pahlsson	Sweden	Modo Hockey (Sweden)
7	188	Roman Pylner	Czech Republic	HC Litvinov Jr. (Czech Republic)
8	214	Matthew Scorsune	United States	Hotchkiss School (USHS-CT)
9	240	Justin Clark	United States	University of Michigan (CCHA)
