= 1996–97 Buffalo Sabres season =

NHL hockey team season

1996–97 Buffalo Sabres
- Northeast Division champions
- Division: 1st Northeast
- Conference: 2nd Eastern
- 1996–97 record: 40–30–12
- Home record: 24–11–6
- Road record: 16–19–6
- Goals for: 237
- Goals against: 208

Team information
- General manager: John Muckler
- Coach: Ted Nolan
- Captain: Pat LaFontaine
- Arena: Marine Midland Arena
- Average attendance: 16,911
- Minor league affiliates: Rochester Americans; South Carolina Stingrays

Team leaders
- Goals: Donald Audette (28)
- Assists: Garry Galley (34)
- Points: Derek Plante (53)
- Penalty minutes: Rob Ray (286)
- Plus/minus: Michael Peca (+26)
- Wins: Dominik Hasek (37)
- Goals against average: Dominik Hasek (2.27)

The 1996–97 Buffalo Sabres season was the 27th for the National Hockey League (NHL) franchise that was established on May 22, 1970. The season was the first season in the newly constructed Marine Midland Arena. The Sabres also underwent a drastic uniform change, replacing the blue and gold colors and classic crest with a black and red color scheme and new white buffalo-head logo. The Sabres won their first Northeast Division title, their first division title in 16 years.

== Regular season ==
On January 12, 1997, Jason Dawe scored just ten seconds into the overtime period to give the Sabres a 3–2 road win over the Phoenix Coyotes. It would prove to be the fastest overtime goal scored during the 1996–97 NHL regular season.

The Sabres allowed the fewest shorthanded goals (4) and scored the most shorthanded goals (16) in the NHL. The Sabres' power play struggled, as they finished 26th in power-play percentage, with 13.19% (43 for 326). The Sabres were also shut out a league-high 10 times during the regular season.

=== Season standings ===
Northeast Division
No.	CR		GP	W	L	T	GF	GA	Pts
1	2	**Buffalo Sabres**	82	40	30	12	237	208	92
2	6	**Pittsburgh Penguins**	82	38	36	8	285	280	84
3	7	**Ottawa Senators**	82	31	36	15	226	234	77
4	8	**Montreal Canadiens**	82	31	36	15	249	276	77
5	10	Hartford Whalers	82	32	39	11	226	256	75
6	13	Boston Bruins	82	26	47	9	234	300	61

Eastern Conference
R		Div	GP	W	L	T	GF	GA	Pts
**1**	**New Jersey Devils**	**ATL**	**82**	**45**	**23**	**14**	**231**	**182**	**104**
**2**	**Buffalo Sabres**	**NE**	**82**	**40**	**30**	**12**	**237**	**208**	**92**
**3**	**Philadelphia Flyers**	**ATL**	**82**	**45**	**24**	**13**	**274**	**217**	**103**
**4**	**Florida Panthers**	**ATL**	**82**	**35**	**28**	**19**	**221**	**201**	**89**
**5**	**New York Rangers**	**ATL**	**82**	**38**	**34**	**10**	**258**	**231**	**86**
**6**	**Pittsburgh Penguins**	**NE**	**82**	**38**	**36**	**8**	**285**	**280**	**84**
**7**	**Ottawa Senators**	**NE**	**82**	**31**	**36**	**15**	**226**	**234**	**77**
**8**	**Montreal Canadiens**	**NE**	**82**	**31**	**36**	**15**	**249**	**276**	**77**
9	Washington Capitals	ATL	82	33	40	9	214	231	75
10	Hartford Whalers	NE	82	32	39	11	226	256	75
11	Tampa Bay Lightning	ATL	82	32	40	10	217	247	74
12	New York Islanders	ATL	82	29	41	12	240	250	70
13	Boston Bruins	NE	82	26	47	9	234	300	61

Divisions: ATL – Atlantic, NE – Northeast

bold – Qualified for playoffs

== Playoffs ==
The Sabres defeated the Ottawa Senators in the first round. The series was played to overtime in Game 7. Derek Plante scored the series clinching goal in overtime. The Sabres then lost to the Philadelphia Flyers in five games in the second round.

== Schedule and results ==
=== Regular season ===
1996–97 regular season
October: 5–6–0 (home: 3–2–0; road: 2–4–0)

Game	Date	Score	Opponent	Record	Recap
1	October 4, 1996	3–4	@ Edmonton Oilers (1996–97)	0–1–0	L
2	October 6, 1996	0–3	@ Calgary Flames (1996–97)	0–2–0	L
3	October 9, 1996	2–1	@ Vancouver Canucks (1996–97)	1–2–0	W
4	October 12, 1996	1–6	Detroit Red Wings (1996–97)	1–3–0	L
5	October 15, 1996	0–4	Tampa Bay Lightning (1996–97)	1–4–0	L
6	October 17, 1996	4–1	Pittsburgh Penguins (1996–97)	2–4–0	W
7	October 18, 1996	4–1	@ Washington Capitals (1996–97)	3–4–0	W
8	October 24, 1996	6–3	Montreal Canadiens (1996–97)	4–4–0	W
9	October 26, 1996	6–3	Hartford Whalers (1996–97)	5–4–0	W
10	October 27, 1996	4–6	@ New York Rangers (1996–97)	5–5–0	L
11	October 30, 1996	0–2	@ Dallas Stars (1996–97)	5–6–0	L

November: 8–5–1 (home: 4–1–0; road: 4–4–1)

Game	Date	Score	Opponent	Record	Recap
12	November 1, 1996	4–2	@ St. Louis Blues (1996–97)	6–6–0	W
13	November 2, 1996	0–0 OT	@ Colorado Avalanche (1996–97)	6–6–1	T
14	November 7, 1996	2–5	Philadelphia Flyers (1996–97)	6–7–1	L
15	November 9, 1996	3–4 OT	@ Hartford Whalers (1996–97)	6–8–1	L
16	November 11, 1996	3–2 OT	Florida Panthers (1996–97)	7–8–1	W
17	November 12, 1996	0–3	@ Pittsburgh Penguins (1996–97)	7–9–1	L
18	November 14, 1996	5–4	Colorado Avalanche (1996–97)	8–9–1	W
19	November 19, 1996	3–4	@ Toronto Maple Leafs (1996–97)	8–10–1	L
20	November 21, 1996	6–3	Toronto Maple Leafs (1996–97)	9–10–1	W
21	November 23, 1996	3–2 OT	@ Boston Bruins (1996–97)	10–10–1	W
22	November 26, 1996	3–4	@ Florida Panthers (1996–97)	10–11–1	L
23	November 27, 1996	3–0	@ Tampa Bay Lightning (1996–97)	11–11–1	W
24	November 29, 1996	3–0	Ottawa Senators (1996–97)	12–11–1	W
25	November 30, 1996	3–2	@ New York Islanders (1996–97)	13–11–1	W

December: 7–4–2 (home: 4–2–1; road: 3–2–1)

Game	Date	Score	Opponent	Record	Recap
26	December 4, 1996	6–7 OT	Vancouver Canucks (1996–97)	13–12–1	L
27	December 6, 1996	1–1 OT	Mighty Ducks of Anaheim (1996–97)	13–12–2	T
28	December 7, 1996	4–6	@ Hartford Whalers (1996–97)	13–13–2	L
29	December 11, 1996	3–2 OT	@ Montreal Canadiens (1996–97)	14–13–2	W
30	December 13, 1996	0–3	New York Rangers (1996–97)	14–14–2	L
31	December 14, 1996	4–0	@ Boston Bruins (1996–97)	15–14–2	W
32	December 18, 1996	5–3	Tampa Bay Lightning (1996–97)	16–14–2	W
33	December 20, 1996	6–2	Los Angeles Kings (1996–97)	17–14–2	W
34	December 21, 1996	3–2	@ Ottawa Senators (1996–97)	18–14–2	W
35	December 23, 1996	0–0 OT	@ New Jersey Devils (1996–97)	18–14–3	T
36	December 26, 1996	5–1	Hartford Whalers (1996–97)	19–14–3	W
37	December 28, 1996	0–2	@ Pittsburgh Penguins (1996–97)	19–15–3	L
38	December 31, 1996	6–5	New Jersey Devils (1996–97)	20–15–3	W

January: 7–4–2 (home: 5–2–1; road: 2–2–1)

Game	Date	Score	Opponent	Record	Recap
39	January 3, 1997	2–2 OT	St. Louis Blues (1996–97)	20–15–4	T
40	January 5, 1997	5–1	Phoenix Coyotes (1996–97)	21–15–4	W
41	January 7, 1997	1–1 OT	@ San Jose Sharks (1996–97)	21–15–5	T
42	January 9, 1997	3–6	@ Los Angeles Kings (1996–97)	21–16–5	L
43	January 10, 1997	2–5	@ Mighty Ducks of Anaheim (1996–97)	21–17–5	L
44	January 12, 1997	3–2 OT	@ Phoenix Coyotes (1996–97)	22–17–5	W
45	January 15, 1997	2–1	@ New York Islanders (1996–97)	23–17–5	W
46	January 20, 1997	2–1	Chicago Blackhawks (1996–97)	24–17–5	W
47	January 22, 1997	6–1	Montreal Canadiens (1996–97)	25–17–5	W
48	January 24, 1997	1–3	Edmonton Oilers (1996–97)	25–18–5	L
49	January 25, 1997	1–5	Hartford Whalers (1996–97)	25–19–5	L
50	January 29, 1997	3–1	Pittsburgh Penguins (1996–97)	26–19–5	W
51	January 31, 1997	3–1	Dallas Stars (1996–97)	27–19–5	W

February: 5–1–5 (home: 4–0–4; road: 1–1–1)

Game	Date	Score	Opponent	Record	Recap
52	February 2, 1997	2–2 OT	Washington Capitals (1996–97)	27–19–6	T
53	February 4, 1997	1–1 OT	@ Philadelphia Flyers (1996–97)	27–19–7	T
54	February 6, 1997	1–1 OT	Florida Panthers (1996–97)	27–19–8	T
55	February 8, 1997	3–1	@ Tampa Bay Lightning (1996–97)	28–19–8	W
56	February 9, 1997	2–1	Ottawa Senators (1996–97)	29–19–8	W
57	February 12, 1997	2–2 OT	Montreal Canadiens (1996–97)	29–19–9	T
58	February 16, 1997	6–2	San Jose Sharks (1996–97)	30–19–9	W
59	February 18, 1997	5–5 OT	Calgary Flames (1996–97)	30–19–10	T
60	February 21, 1997	5–2	New York Islanders (1996–97)	31–19–10	W
61	February 23, 1997	5–1	Boston Bruins (1996–97)	32–19–10	W
62	February 27, 1997	1–4	@ New Jersey Devils (1996–97)	32–20–10	L

March: 6–6–1 (home: 3–2–0; road: 3–4–1)

Game	Date	Score	Opponent	Record	Recap
63	March 1, 1997	3–1	@ Ottawa Senators (1996–97)	33–20–10	W
64	March 5, 1997	4–2	Pittsburgh Penguins (1996–97)	34–20–10	W
65	March 8, 1997	3–3 OT	@ Montreal Canadiens (1996–97)	34–20–11	T
66	March 9, 1997	1–4	New Jersey Devils (1996–97)	34–21–11	L
67	March 11, 1997	3–2 OT	Philadelphia Flyers (1996–97)	35–21–11	W
68	March 15, 1997	7–5	@ Philadelphia Flyers (1996–97)	36–21–11	W
69	March 17, 1997	5–1	Boston Bruins (1996–97)	37–21–11	W
70	March 18, 1997	3–5	@ Pittsburgh Penguins (1996–97)	37–22–11	L
71	March 21, 1997	4–1	@ Washington Capitals (1996–97)	38–22–11	W
72	March 22, 1997	2–3	@ Florida Panthers (1996–97)	38–23–11	L
73	March 26, 1997	2–3 OT	New York Islanders (1996–97)	38–24–11	L
74	March 28, 1997	1–2 OT	@ Detroit Red Wings (1996–97)	38–25–11	L
75	March 30, 1997	2–3	@ Chicago Blackhawks (1996–97)	38–26–11	L

April: 2–4–1 (home: 1–2–0; road: 1–2–1)

Game	Date	Score	Opponent	Record	Recap
76	April 1, 1997	1–1 OT	@ New York Rangers (1996–97)	38–26–12	T
77	April 2, 1997	0–2	Ottawa Senators (1996–97)	38–27–12	L
78	April 4, 1997	5–1	New York Rangers (1996–97)	39–27–12	W
79	April 7, 1997	2–4	@ Hartford Whalers (1996–97)	39–28–12	L
80	April 10, 1997	5–1	@ Boston Bruins (1996–97)	40–28–12	W
81	April 12, 1997	0–1	@ Ottawa Senators (1996–97)	40–29–12	L
82	April 13, 1997	3–8	Washington Capitals (1996–97)	40–30–12	L

Legend: W Win (2 points) L Loss (0 points) T Tie (1 point)

=== Playoffs ===
1997 Stanley Cup playoffs
Eastern Conference Quarterfinals vs. (7) Ottawa Senators – Sabres win 4–3

Game	Date	Score	Opponent	Series	Recap
1	April 17, 1997	3–1	Ottawa Senators	Sabres lead 1–0	W
2	April 19, 1997	1–3	Ottawa Senators	Series tied 1–1	L
3	April 21, 1997	3–2	@ Ottawa Senators	Sabres lead 2–1	W
4	April 23, 1997	0–1 OT	@ Ottawa Senators	Series tied 2–2	L
5	April 25, 1997	1–4	Ottawa Senators	Senators lead 3–2	L
6	April 27, 1997	3–0	@ Ottawa Senators	Series tied 3–3	W
7	April 29, 1997	3–2 OT	Ottawa Senators	Sabres win 4–3	W

Eastern Conference Semifinals vs. (3) Philadelphia Flyers – Flyers win 4–1

Game	Date	Score	Opponent	Series	Recap
1	May 3, 1997	3–5	Philadelphia Flyers	Flyers lead 1–0	L
2	May 5, 1997	1–2	Philadelphia Flyers	Flyers lead 2–0	L
3	May 7, 1997	1–4	@ Philadelphia Flyers	Flyers lead 3–0	L
4	May 9, 1997	5–4 OT	@ Philadelphia Flyers	Flyers lead 3–1	W
5	May 11, 1997	3–6	Philadelphia Flyers	Flyers win 4–1	L

Legend: W Win L Loss

== Player statistics ==
=== Scoring ===
- Position abbreviations: C = Center; D = Defense; G = Goaltender; LW = Left wing; RW = Right wing
- † = Joined team via a transaction (e.g., trade, waivers, signing) during the season. Stats reflect time with the Sabres only.
- ‡ = Left team via a transaction (e.g., trade, waivers, release) during the season. Stats reflect time with the Sabres only.

No.	Player	Pos	Regular season						Playoffs					
No.	Player	Pos	GP	G	A	Pts	+/-	PIM	GP	G	A	Pts	+/-	PIM
26	Derek Plante	C	82	27	26	53	14	24	12	4	6	10	4	4
19	Brian Holzinger	C	81	22	29	51	9	54	12	2	5	7	−3	8
28	Donald Audette	RW	73	28	22	50	−6	48	11	4	5	9	−3	6
27	Michael Peca	C	79	20	29	49	26	80	10	0	2	2	−3	8
17 (Note: Dawe wore number 43 in his first two games.)	Jason Dawe	RW	81	22	26	48	14	32	11	2	1	3	−2	6
15	Dixon Ward	RW	79	13	32	45	17	36	12	2	3	5	2	6
36	Matthew Barnaby	RW	68	19	24	43	16	249	8	0	4	4	2	36
3	Garry Galley	D	71	4	34	38	10	102	12	0	6	6	2	14
18	Michal Grosek	LW	82	15	21	36	25	71	12	3	3	6	3	8
44	Alexei Zhitnik	D	80	7	28	35	10	95	12	1	0	1	−9	16
12	Randy Burridge	LW	55	10	21	31	17	20	12	5	1	6	−5	2
42	Richard Smehlik	D	62	11	19	30	19	43	12	0	2	2	0	4
8	Darryl Shannon	D	82	4	19	23	23	112	12	2	3	5	−1	8
4	Mike Wilson	D	77	2	9	11	13	51	10	0	1	1	3	2
81	Miroslav Satan†	LW	12	8	2	10	1	4	7	0	0	0	−1	0
32	Rob Ray	RW	82	7	3	10	3	286	12	0	1	1	−3	28
74	Jay McKee	D	43	1	9	10	3	35	3	0	0	0	0	0
16	Pat LaFontaine	C	13	2	6	8	−8	4	—	—	—	—	—	—
38	Barrie Moore‡	LW	31	2	6	8	1	18	—	—	—	—	—	—
6 (Note: Boughner wore number 46 in his first four games.)	Bob Boughner	D	77	1	7	8	12	225	11	0	1	1	0	9
37	Curtis Brown	C	28	4	3	7	4	18	—	—	—	—	—	—
10	Brad May	LW	42	3	4	7	−8	106	10	1	1	2	−2	32
76	Wayne Primeau	C	45	2	4	6	−2	64	9	0	0	0	−2	6
93	Anatoli Semenov	C	25	2	4	6	−3	2	—	—	—	—	—	—
5	Ed Ronan	RW	18	1	4	5	4	11	6	1	0	1	−1	6
39	Dominik Hasek	G	67	0	3	3		30	3	0	0	0		2
22	Charlie Huddy	D	1	0	0	0	−1	0	—	—	—	—	—	—
40	Rumun Ndur	D	2	0	0	0	1	2	—	—	—	—	—	—
31	Steve Shields	G	13	0	0	0		4	10	0	0	0		9
30	Andrei Trefilov	G	3	0	0	0		0	1	0	0	0		0
25	Vaclav Varada	RW	5	0	0	0	0	2	—	—	—	—	—	—

=== Goaltending ===
No.	Player	Regular season										Playoffs								
No.	Player	GP	W	L	T	SA	GA	GAA	SV%	SO	TOI	GP	W	L	SA	GA	GAA	SV%	SO	TOI
39	Dominik Hasek	67	37	20	10	2177	153	2.27	.930	5	4036:59	3	1	1	68	5	1.96	.926	0	153:24
31	Steve Shields	13	3	8	2	447	39	2.96	.913	0	789:19	10	4	6	334	26	2.74	.922	1	569:35
30	Andrei Trefilov	3	0	2	0	98	10	3.78	.898	0	158:39	1	0	0	4	0	0.00	1.000	0	5:11

== Awards and records ==
=== Awards ===
Type	Award/honor	Recipient	Ref
League (annual)	Hart Memorial Trophy	Dominik Hasek	
League (annual)	Frank J. Selke Trophy	Michael Peca	
League (annual)	Jack Adams Award	Ted Nolan	
League (annual)	Lester B. Pearson Award	Dominik Hasek	
League (annual)	Lester Patrick Trophy	Seymour H. Knox III	
League (annual)	Lester Patrick Trophy	Pat LaFontaine	
League (annual)	NHL First All-Star team	Dominik Hasek (Goaltender)	
League (annual)	Vezina Trophy	Dominik Hasek	
League (in-season)	NHL All-Star Game selection	Dominik Hasek	

=== Milestones ===
Milestone	Player	Date	Ref
First game	Rumun Ndur	November 9, 1996	

== Draft picks ==
Buffalo's draft picks at the 1996 NHL entry draft held at the Kiel Center in St. Louis, Missouri.

Round	#	Player	Nationality	College/Junior/Club team (League)
1	7	Erik Rasmussen	United States	University of Minnesota (WCHA)
2	27	Cory Sarich	Canada	Saskatoon Blades (WHL)
2	33	Darren Van Oene	Canada	Brandon Wheat Kings (WHL)
3	54	Francois Methot	Canada	Saint-Hyacinthe Laser (QMJHL)
4	87	Kurt Walsh	Canada	Owen Sound Platers (OHL)
4	106	Mike Martone	Canada	Peterborough Petes (OHL)
5	115	Alexei Tezikov	Russia	Lada Togliatti (Russia)
6	142	Ryan Davis	Canada	Owen Sound Platers (OHL)
6	161	Darren Mortier	Canada	Sarnia Sting (OHL)
9	222	Scott Buhler	Canada	Medicine Hat Tigers (WHL)
