= 1996–97 Florida Panthers season =

National Hockey League team season

1996–97 Florida Panthers
- Division: 3rd Atlantic
- Conference: 4th Eastern
- 1996–97 record: 35–28–19
- Home record: 21–12–8
- Road record: 14–16–11
- Goals for: 221
- Goals against: 201

Team information
- General manager: Bryan Murray
- Coach: Doug MacLean
- Captain: Brian Skrudland
- Arena: Miami Arena
- Average attendance: 14,703
- Minor league affiliates: Carolina Monarchs; Tallahassee Tiger Sharks; Port Huron Border Cats

Team leaders
- Goals: Ray Sheppard (29)
- Assists: Robert Svehla (32)
- Points: Ray Sheppard (60)
- Penalty minutes: Paul Laus (313)
- Plus/minus: Rhett Warrener (+20)
- Wins: John Vanbiesbrouck (27)
- Goals against average: John Vanbiesbrouck (2.29)

The 1996–97 Florida Panthers season was the Panthers' fourth season.

== Regular season ==
=== Final standings ===
Atlantic Division
No.	CR		GP	W	L	T	GF	GA	Pts
1	1	**New Jersey Devils**	82	45	23	14	231	182	104
2	3	**Philadelphia Flyers**	82	45	24	13	274	217	103
3	4	**Florida Panthers**	82	35	28	19	221	201	89
4	5	**New York Rangers**	82	38	34	10	258	231	86
5	9	Washington Capitals	82	33	40	9	214	231	75
6	11	Tampa Bay Lightning	82	32	40	10	217	247	74
7	12	New York Islanders	82	29	41	12	240	250	70

Eastern Conference
R		Div	GP	W	L	T	GF	GA	Pts
**1**	**New Jersey Devils**	**ATL**	**82**	**45**	**23**	**14**	**231**	**182**	**104**
**2**	**Buffalo Sabres**	**NE**	**82**	**40**	**30**	**12**	**237**	**208**	**92**
**3**	**Philadelphia Flyers**	**ATL**	**82**	**45**	**24**	**13**	**274**	**217**	**103**
**4**	**Florida Panthers**	**ATL**	**82**	**35**	**28**	**19**	**221**	**201**	**89**
**5**	**New York Rangers**	**ATL**	**82**	**38**	**34**	**10**	**258**	**231**	**86**
**6**	**Pittsburgh Penguins**	**NE**	**82**	**38**	**36**	**8**	**285**	**280**	**84**
**7**	**Ottawa Senators**	**NE**	**82**	**31**	**36**	**15**	**226**	**234**	**77**
**8**	**Montreal Canadiens**	**NE**	**82**	**31**	**36**	**15**	**249**	**276**	**77**
9	Washington Capitals	ATL	82	33	40	9	214	231	75
10	Hartford Whalers	NE	82	32	39	11	226	256	75
11	Tampa Bay Lightning	ATL	82	32	40	10	217	247	74
12	New York Islanders	ATL	82	29	41	12	240	250	70
13	Boston Bruins	NE	82	26	47	9	234	300	61

Divisions: ATL – Atlantic, NE – Northeast

bold – Qualified for playoffs

== Playoffs ==
Following their remarkable run to the Stanley Cup Finals in the 1996 playoffs, the Panthers qualified for the 1997 Stanley Cup playoffs. As the fourth seed in the Eastern Conference, they played the fifth seeded New York Rangers. However, the Panthers were eliminated in five games.

== Schedule and results ==
=== Regular season ===
1996–97 regular season
October: 8–0–4 (home: 4–0–1; road: 4–0–3)

Game	Date	Score	Opponent	Record	Recap
1	October 5, 1996	3–1	@ Philadelphia Flyers (1996–97)	1–0–0	W
2	October 6, 1996	5–2	@ New York Rangers (1996–97)	2–0–0	W
3	October 8, 1996	1–1 OT	New York Rangers (1996–97)	2–0–1	T
4	October 12, 1996	6–0	Hartford Whalers (1996–97)	3–0–1	W
5	October 16, 1996	3–3 OT	@ San Jose Sharks (1996–97)	3–0–2	T
6	October 17, 1996	2–1	@ Colorado Avalanche (1996–97)	4–0–2	W
7	October 20, 1996	1–1 OT	@ Phoenix Coyotes (1996–97)	4–0–3	T
8	October 23, 1996	5–2	Ottawa Senators (1996–97)	5–0–3	W
9	October 25, 1996	6–4	New York Rangers (1996–97)	6–0–3	W
10	October 27, 1996	3–2	@ Philadelphia Flyers (1996–97)	7–0–3	W
11	October 29, 1996	1–1 OT	@ New York Rangers (1996–97)	7–0–4	T
12	October 30, 1996	3–2	Chicago Blackhawks (1996–97)	8–0–4	W

November: 7–3–2 (home: 4–2–2; road: 3–1–0)

Game	Date	Score	Opponent	Record	Recap
13	November 2, 1996	2–3	Philadelphia Flyers (1996–97)	8–1–4	L
14	November 7, 1996	4–2	Washington Capitals (1996–97)	9–1–4	W
15	November 9, 1996	4–2	Pittsburgh Penguins (1996–97)	10–1–4	W
16	November 11, 1996	2–3 OT	@ Buffalo Sabres (1996–97)	10–2–4	L
17	November 13, 1996	5–3	@ Montreal Canadiens (1996–97)	11–2–4	W
18	November 15, 1996	3–3 OT	New York Islanders (1996–97)	11–2–5	T
19	November 18, 1996	2–4	Washington Capitals (1996–97)	11–3–5	L
20	November 20, 1996	4–1	Los Angeles Kings (1996–97)	12–3–5	W
21	November 22, 1996	2–1 OT	@ Dallas Stars (1996–97)	13–3–5	W
22	November 23, 1996	3–1	@ St. Louis Blues (1996–97)	14–3–5	W
23	November 26, 1996	4–3	Buffalo Sabres (1996–97)	15–3–5	W
24	November 29, 1996	1–1 OT	Hartford Whalers (1996–97)	15–3–6	T

December: 5–6–3 (home: 2–1–1; road: 3–5–2)

Game	Date	Score	Opponent	Record	Recap
25	December 1, 1996	4–2	@ Detroit Red Wings (1996–97)	16–3–6	W
26	December 3, 1996	0–2	@ New Jersey Devils (1996–97)	16–4–6	L
27	December 5, 1996	4–2	New York Islanders (1996–97)	17–4–6	W
28	December 8, 1996	1–1 OT	Dallas Stars (1996–97)	17–4–7	T
29	December 10, 1996	4–5	@ Philadelphia Flyers (1996–97)	17–5–7	L
30	December 11, 1996	2–5	@ Hartford Whalers (1996–97)	17–6–7	L
31	December 15, 1996	6–3	Edmonton Oilers (1996–97)	18–6–7	W
32	December 19, 1996	2–5	@ Ottawa Senators (1996–97)	18–7–7	L
33	December 20, 1996	3–1	@ Chicago Blackhawks (1996–97)	19–7–7	W
34	December 22, 1996	3–7	@ New York Rangers (1996–97)	19–8–7	L
35	December 23, 1996	4–3 OT	@ New York Islanders (1996–97)	20–8–7	W
36	December 26, 1996	3–3 OT	@ Tampa Bay Lightning (1996–97)	20–8–8	T
37	December 28, 1996	1–1 OT	@ Washington Capitals (1996–97)	20–8–9	T
38	December 29, 1996	1–2	Montreal Canadiens (1996–97)	20–9–9	L

January: 6–5–1 (home: 3–2–0; road: 3–3–1)

Game	Date	Score	Opponent	Record	Recap
39	January 1, 1997	0–3	Mighty Ducks of Anaheim (1996–97)	20–10–9	L
40	January 4, 1997	5–0	@ Los Angeles Kings (1996–97)	21–10–9	W
41	January 8, 1997	2–3	@ Mighty Ducks of Anaheim (1996–97)	21–11–9	L
42	January 11, 1997	4–1	@ Calgary Flames (1996–97)	22–11–9	W
43	January 14, 1997	4–4 OT	@ Vancouver Canucks (1996–97)	22–11–10	T
44	January 15, 1997	0–4	@ Edmonton Oilers (1996–97)	22–12–10	L
45	January 20, 1997	2–4	Colorado Avalanche (1996–97)	22–13–10	L
46	January 22, 1997	1–2 OT	@ Hartford Whalers (1996–97)	22–14–10	L
47	January 23, 1997	4–1	@ Boston Bruins (1996–97)	23–14–10	W
48	January 25, 1997	3–2	Tampa Bay Lightning (1996–97)	24–14–10	W
49	January 28, 1997	5–1	Montreal Canadiens (1996–97)	25–14–10	W
50	January 30, 1997	3–1	Boston Bruins (1996–97)	26–14–10	W

February: 3–5–5 (home: 3–3–2; road: 0–2–3)

Game	Date	Score	Opponent	Record	Recap
51	February 1, 1997	1–3	Washington Capitals (1996–97)	26–15–10	L
52	February 3, 1997	2–2 OT	@ Montreal Canadiens (1996–97)	26–15–11	T
53	February 6, 1997	1–1 OT	@ Buffalo Sabres (1996–97)	26–15–12	T
54	February 7, 1997	2–2 OT	@ New Jersey Devils (1996–97)	26–15–13	T
55	February 9, 1997	4–3	New York Rangers (1996–97)	27–15–13	W
56	February 12, 1997	5–2	Tampa Bay Lightning (1996–97)	28–15–13	W
57	February 15, 1997	0–1 OT	@ New York Islanders (1996–97)	28–16–13	L
58	February 16, 1997	2–4	Detroit Red Wings (1996–97)	28–17–13	L
59	February 18, 1997	2–4	@ Pittsburgh Penguins (1996–97)	28–18–13	L
60	February 20, 1997	2–2 OT	New Jersey Devils (1996–97)	28–18–14	T
61	February 22, 1997	3–4 OT	Philadelphia Flyers (1996–97)	28–19–14	L
62	February 25, 1997	2–2 OT	San Jose Sharks (1996–97)	28–19–15	T
63	February 27, 1997	3–2 OT	St. Louis Blues (1996–97)	29–19–15	W

March: 4–7–3 (home: 3–4–2; road: 1–3–1)

Game	Date	Score	Opponent	Record	Recap
64	March 1, 1997	0–2	@ Tampa Bay Lightning (1996–97)	29–20–15	L
65	March 5, 1997	0–3	Phoenix Coyotes (1996–97)	29–21–15	L
66	March 7, 1997	1–3	Calgary Flames (1996–97)	29–22–15	L
67	March 9, 1997	1–3	Boston Bruins (1996–97)	29–23–15	L
68	March 11, 1997	3–2	New York Islanders (1996–97)	30–23–15	W
69	March 13, 1997	5–4	Vancouver Canucks (1996–97)	31–23–15	W
70	March 15, 1997	3–3 OT	Toronto Maple Leafs (1996–97)	31–23–16	T
71	March 17, 1997	4–1	@ New Jersey Devils (1996–97)	32–23–16	W
72	March 19, 1997	4–7	@ New York Islanders (1996–97)	32–24–16	L
73	March 20, 1997	2–2 OT	@ Ottawa Senators (1996–97)	32–24–17	T
74	March 22, 1997	3–2	Buffalo Sabres (1996–97)	33–24–17	W
75	March 27, 1997	2–3	Ottawa Senators (1996–97)	33–25–17	L
76	March 29, 1997	1–1 OT	Tampa Bay Lightning (1996–97)	33–25–18	T
77	March 31, 1997	3–4	@ Pittsburgh Penguins (1996–97)	33–26–18	L

April: 2–2–1 (home: 2–0–0; road: 0–2–1)

Game	Date	Score	Opponent	Record	Recap
78	April 2, 1997	1–3	@ Toronto Maple Leafs (1996–97)	33–27–18	L
79	April 5, 1997	2–4	@ Boston Bruins (1996–97)	33–28–18	L
80	April 6, 1997	3–3 OT	@ Washington Capitals (1996–97)	33–28–19	T
81	April 9, 1997	4–2	New Jersey Devils (1996–97)	34–28–19	W
82	April 11, 1997	4–2	Pittsburgh Penguins (1996–97)	35–28–19	W

Legend: W Win (2 points) L Loss (0 points) T Tie (1 point)

=== Playoffs ===
1997 Stanley Cup playoffs
Eastern Conference Quarterfinals vs. (5) New York Rangers – Rangers win 4–1

Game	Date	Score	Opponent	Series	Recap
1	April 17, 1997	3–0	New York Rangers	Panthers lead 1–0	W
2	April 20, 1997	0–3	New York Rangers	Series tied 1–1	L
3	April 22, 1997	3–4 OT	@ New York Rangers	Rangers lead 2–1	L
4	April 23, 1997	2–3	@ New York Rangers	Rangers lead 3–1	L
5	April 25, 1997	2–3 OT	New York Rangers	Rangers win 4–1	L

Legend: W Win L Loss

== Player statistics ==
=== Scoring ===
- Position abbreviations: C = Center; D = Defense; G = Goaltender; LW = Left wing; RW = Right wing
- † = Joined team via a transaction (e.g., trade, waivers, signing) during the season. Stats reflect time with the Panthers only.
- ‡ = Left team via a transaction (e.g., trade, waivers, release) during the season. Stats reflect time with the Panthers only.

No.	Player	Pos	Regular season						Playoffs					
No.	Player	Pos	GP	G	A	Pts	+/-	PIM	GP	G	A	Pts	+/-	PIM
26	Ray Sheppard	RW	68	29	31	60	4	4	5	2	0	2	−4	0
27	Scott Mellanby	RW	82	27	29	56	7	170	5	0	2	2	−1	4
24	Robert Svehla	D	82	13	32	45	2	86	5	1	4	5	−4	4
19	Radek Dvorak	RW	78	18	21	39	−2	30	3	0	0	0	0	0
44	Rob Niedermayer	C	60	14	24	38	4	54	5	2	1	3	−1	6
29	Johan Garpenlov	LW	53	11	25	36	10	47	4	2	0	2	0	4
11	Bill Lindsay	RW	81	11	23	34	1	120	3	0	1	1	0	8
10	Dave Lowry	LW	77	15	14	29	2	51	5	0	0	0	−3	0
4	Per Gustafsson	D	58	7	22	29	11	22	—	—	—	—	—	—
28	Martin Straka	C	55	7	22	29	9	12	4	0	0	0	−2	0
21	Tom Fitzgerald	RW	71	10	14	24	7	64	5	0	1	1	−1	0
5	Gord Murphy	D	80	8	15	23	3	51	5	0	5	5	0	4
55	Ed Jovanovski	D	61	7	16	23	−1	172	5	0	0	0	−4	4
20	Brian Skrudland	C	51	5	13	18	4	48	—	—	—	—	—	—
12	Jody Hull	RW	67	10	6	16	1	4	5	0	0	0	−1	0
18	Mike Hough	LW	69	8	6	14	12	48	5	1	0	1	−2	2
15	David Nemirovsky	RW	39	7	7	14	1	32	3	1	0	1	−2	0
2	Terry Carkner	D	70	0	14	14	−4	96	5	0	0	0	−3	6
7	Rhett Warrener	D	62	4	9	13	20	88	5	0	0	0	0	0
3	Paul Laus	D	77	0	12	12	13	313	5	0	1	1	−3	4
14	Stu Barnes‡	C	19	2	8	10	−3	10	—	—	—	—	—	—
22	Steve Washburn	C	18	3	6	9	2	4	—	—	—	—	—	—
23	Chris Wells†	C	47	2	6	8	5	42	3	0	0	0	−1	0
9	Kirk Muller†	LW	10	1	2	3	−2	4	5	1	2	3	−3	4
17	Jason Podollan‡	RW	19	1	1	2	−3	4	—	—	—	—	—	—
34	John Vanbiesbrouck	G	57	0	2	2		8	5	0	0	0		0
9	Brad Smyth‡	RW	8	1	0	1	−3	2	—	—	—	—	—	—
30	Mark Fitzpatrick	G	30	0	1	1		13	—	—	—	—	—	—
16	Craig Ferguson	C	3	0	0	0	−1	0	—	—	—	—	—	—
16	Craig Fisher†	C	4	0	0	0	−2	0	—	—	—	—	—	—
8	Craig Martin	RW	1	0	0	0	0	5	—	—	—	—	—	—
25	Geoff Smith	D	3	0	0	0	1	2	—	—	—	—	—	—
6	Jason Woolley‡	D	3	0	0	0	1	2	—	—	—	—	—	—

=== Goaltending ===
No.	Player	Regular season										Playoffs								
No.	Player	GP	W	L	T	SA	GA	GAA	SV%	SO	TOI	GP	W	L	SA	GA	GAA	SV%	SO	TOI
34	John Vanbiesbrouck	57	27	19	10	1582	128	2.29	.919	2	3347	5	1	4	184	13	2.38	.929	1	328
30	Mark Fitzpatrick	30	8	9	9	771	66	2.36	.914	0	1680	—	—	—	—	—	—	—	—	—

== Awards and records ==
=== Awards ===
Type	Award/honor	Recipient	Ref
League (in-season)	NHL All-Star Game selection	Doug MacLean (coach)	
League (in-season)	NHL All-Star Game selection	Robert Svehla	
League (in-season)	NHL All-Star Game selection	John Vanbiesbrouck (Note: Vanbiesbrouck was voted to the starting lineup.)	

=== Milestones ===
Milestone	Player	Date	Ref
First game	Per Gustafsson	October 12, 1996	
First game	Jason Podollan	November 29, 1996	
25th shutout	John Vanbiesbrouck	January 4, 1997	

== Draft picks ==
Florida's draft picks at the 1996 NHL entry draft held at the Kiel Center in St. Louis, Missouri.

Round	#	Player	Nationality	College/Junior/Club team (League)
1	20	Marcus Nilson	Sweden	Djurgardens IF (Sweden)
3	60	Chris Allen	Canada	Kingston Frontenacs (OHL)
3	65	Oleg Kvasha	Russia	CSKA Moscow (Russia)
4	82	Joey Tetarenko	Canada	Portland Winter Hawks (WHL)
5	129	Andrew Long	Canada	Guelph Storm (OHL)
6	156	Gaetan Poirier	Canada	Merrimack College (Hockey East)
7	183	Alexandre Couture	Canada	Victoriaville Tigres (QMJHL)
8	209	Denis Khlopotnov	Russia	CSKA Moscow (Russia)
9	235	Russell Smith	Canada	Hull Olympiques (QMJHL)

== See also ==
- 1996–97 NHL season
