= 1996–97 Philadelphia Flyers season =

NHL hockey team season

1996–97 Philadelphia Flyers
- Eastern Conference champions
- Division: 2nd Atlantic
- Conference: 3rd Eastern
- 1996–97 record: 45–24–13
- Home record: 23–12–6
- Road record: 22–12–7
- Goals for: 274
- Goals against: 217

Team information
- General manager: Bob Clarke
- Coach: Terry Murray
- Captain: Eric Lindros
- Alternate captains: Rod Brind'Amour; Eric Desjardins
- Arena: CoreStates Center
- Average attendance: 19,311
- Minor league affiliates: Philadelphia Phantoms; Mobile Mysticks

Team leaders
- Goals: John LeClair (50)
- Assists: John LeClair (47); Eric Lindros (47)
- Points: John LeClair (97)
- Penalty minutes: Scott Daniels (237)
- Plus/minus: John LeClair (+44)
- Wins: Ron Hextall (31)
- Goals against average: Garth Snow (2.52)

The 1996–97 Philadelphia Flyers season was the franchise's 30th season in the National Hockey League (NHL). The Flyers reached the Stanley Cup Final but lost to the Detroit Red Wings in a four-game sweep.

== Regular season ==
While Eric Lindros rehabbed from a bothersome groin injury, the Flyers treaded water through the early part of the schedule. They dropped the first-ever home game at the new CoreStates Center to the Florida Panthers, 3–1, on October 5, and lost again to their new rivals three weeks later. However, they rebounded to end the Panthers' season-opening 8–0–4 run with a 3–2 victory in Miami on November 2.

With John LeClair, Mikael Renberg, Dale Hawerchuk and Rod Brind'Amour expected to pick up the slack on offense, the club was inconsistent and went 12–10–1 prior to Lindros' return in a 2–0 loss in Boston on November 26. Another loss the next night to the Islanders dropped the team into fourth place, but the team soon caught fire, ripping off a 14–0–3 stretch from November 30 to January 7.

The run included an incredible stretch of four consecutive shutout wins in mid-December (Hartford, Boston, Islanders, St. Louis), a trade which netted high-scoring defenseman Paul Coffey and a thrilling come-from-behind 4–4 tie against the Colorado Avalanche in Denver on January 4.

In a 9–5 win over Montreal on February 6, the Legion of Doom line set a franchise-record with 16 points and spoiled the NHL debut of Tomas Vokoun, and in a 5–5 tie on March 1 in Boston, third-line winger Trent Klatt recorded his first (and only) 20-goal season with a hat trick.

A 2–3–2 finish which saw Lindros sit out a one-game suspension and the Devils vault over the team for first place in the Atlantic was mitigated when LeClair scored his 50th goal of the season in a 5–4 win over New Jersey in the final regular-season game.

=== Season standings ===
Atlantic Division
No.	CR		GP	W	L	T	GF	GA	Pts
1	1	**New Jersey Devils**	82	45	23	14	231	182	104
2	3	**Philadelphia Flyers**	82	45	24	13	274	217	103
3	4	**Florida Panthers**	82	35	28	19	221	201	89
4	5	**New York Rangers**	82	38	34	10	258	231	86
5	9	Washington Capitals	82	33	40	9	214	231	75
6	11	Tampa Bay Lightning	82	32	40	10	217	247	74
7	12	New York Islanders	82	29	41	12	240	250	70

Eastern Conference
R		Div	GP	W	L	T	GF	GA	Pts
**1**	**New Jersey Devils**	**ATL**	**82**	**45**	**23**	**14**	**231**	**182**	**104**
**2**	**Buffalo Sabres**	**NE**	**82**	**40**	**30**	**12**	**237**	**208**	**92**
**3**	**Philadelphia Flyers**	**ATL**	**82**	**45**	**24**	**13**	**274**	**217**	**103**
**4**	**Florida Panthers**	**ATL**	**82**	**35**	**28**	**19**	**221**	**201**	**89**
**5**	**New York Rangers**	**ATL**	**82**	**38**	**34**	**10**	**258**	**231**	**86**
**6**	**Pittsburgh Penguins**	**NE**	**82**	**38**	**36**	**8**	**285**	**280**	**84**
**7**	**Ottawa Senators**	**NE**	**82**	**31**	**36**	**15**	**226**	**234**	**77**
**8**	**Montreal Canadiens**	**NE**	**82**	**31**	**36**	**15**	**249**	**276**	**77**
9	Washington Capitals	ATL	82	33	40	9	214	231	75
10	Hartford Whalers	NE	82	32	39	11	226	256	75
11	Tampa Bay Lightning	ATL	82	32	40	10	217	247	74
12	New York Islanders	ATL	82	29	41	12	240	250	70
13	Boston Bruins	NE	82	26	47	9	234	300	61

Divisions: ATL – Atlantic, NE – Northeast

bold – Qualified for playoffs

== Playoffs ==
Backstopped by the goaltending tandem of Ron Hextall and Garth Snow, the Flyers dominated the Pittsburgh Penguins, the Buffalo Sabres, and the New York Rangers all in five games apiece to win the Eastern Conference championship, and clinch a berth in the Stanley Cup Finals for the first time since 1987. However, their opponent, the Detroit Red Wings, swept the Flyers in four straight games. After Game 3, Terry Murray said that the team was in a "choking situation." It is said this remark cost Murray his job, as he was fired less than a week after the conclusion of the Cup Final series.

== Schedule and results ==
=== Regular season ===
1996–97 regular season
October: 6–7–0, 12 points (home: 3–3–0; road: 3–4–0)

Game	Date	Score	Opponent	Decision	Record	Points	Recap
1	October 5	1–3	Florida Panthers	Hextall	0–1–0	0	L
2	October 7	3–1	New Jersey Devils	Hextall	1–1–0	2	W
3	October 10	5–4 OT	Los Angeles Kings	Snow	2–1–0	4	W
4	October 12	1–5	@ New York Islanders	Snow	2–2–0	4	L
5	October 13	0–1	Calgary Flames	Hextall	2–3–0	4	L
6	October 15	2–3	@ Los Angeles Kings	Snow	2–4–0	4	L
7	October 16	4–3	@ Mighty Ducks of Anaheim	Hextall	3–4–0	6	W
8	October 18	3–1	@ Phoenix Coyotes	Hextall	4–4–0	8	W
9	October 22	3–0	Mighty Ducks of Anaheim	Hextall	5–4–0	10	W
10	October 26	5–6	@ Montreal Canadiens	Hextall	5–5–0	10	L
11	October 27	2–3	Florida Panthers	Hextall	5–6–0	10	L
12	October 30	2–4	@ Washington Capitals	Snow	5–7–0	10	L
13	October 31	4–3	@ Tampa Bay Lightning	Hextall	6–7–0	12	W

November: 7–5–1, 15 points (home: 2–3–1; road: 5–2–0)

Game	Date	Score	Opponent	Decision	Record	Points	Recap
14	November 2	3–2	@ Florida Panthers	Hextall	7–7–0	14	W
15	November 4	3–4	New York Islanders	Hextall	7–8–0	14	L
16	November 7	5–2	@ Buffalo Sabres	Hextall	8–8–0	16	W
17	November 9	1–4	Chicago Blackhawks	Snow	8–9–0	16	L
18	November 10	3–1	Toronto Maple Leafs	Hextall	9–9–0	18	W
19	November 13	2–1	@ New York Rangers	Hextall	10–9–0	20	W
20	November 14	2–5	Washington Capitals	Hextall	10–10–0	20	L
21	November 16	2–2 OT	San Jose Sharks	Snow	10–10–1	21	T
22	November 21	7–3	Pittsburgh Penguins	Hextall	11–10–1	23	W
23	November 23	2–1	@ Tampa Bay Lightning	Hextall	12–10–1	25	W
24	November 26	0–2	@ Boston Bruins	Snow	12–11–1	25	L
25	November 27	1–4	@ New York Islanders	Hextall	12–12–1	25	L
26	November 30	4–3	@ Ottawa Senators	Snow	13–12–1	27	W

December: 11–0–2, 24 points (home: 6–0–0; road: 5–0–2)

Game	Date	Score	Opponent	Decision	Record	Points	Recap
27	December 1	4–3	Vancouver Canucks	Hextall	14–12–1	29	W
28	December 4	1–1 OT	@ New York Rangers	Hextall	14–12–2	30	T
29	December 6	6–3	@ Dallas Stars	Hextall	15–12–2	32	W
30	December 10	5–4	Florida Panthers	Hextall	16–12–2	34	W
31	December 12	3–2	Hartford Whalers	Hextall	17–12–2	36	W
32	December 14	4–0	@ Hartford Whalers	Snow	18–12–2	38	W
33	December 15	6–0	Boston Bruins	Hextall	19–12–2	40	W
34	December 19	5–0	New York Islanders	Snow	20–12–2	42	W
35	December 21	4–0	St. Louis Blues	Hextall	21–12–2	44	W
36	December 22	2–2 OT	@ Chicago Blackhawks	Snow	21–12–3	45	T
37	December 27	6–4	@ Edmonton Oilers	Snow	22–12–3	47	W
38	December 29	4–2	@ Calgary Flames	Hextall	23–12–3	49	W
39	December 31	5–3	@ Vancouver Canucks	Hextall	24–12–3	51	W

January: 5–2–4, 14 points (home: 3–2–2; road: 2–0–2)

Game	Date	Score	Opponent	Decision	Record	Points	Recap
40	January 2	4–1	@ San Jose Sharks	Hextall	25–12–3	53	W
41	January 4	4–4 OT	@ Colorado Avalanche	Snow	25–12–4	54	T
42	January 7	7–3	Boston Bruins	Hextall	26–12–4	56	W
43	January 9	1–3	Tampa Bay Lightning	Hextall	26–13–4	56	L
44	January 11	3–3 OT	Washington Capitals	Snow	26–13–5	57	T
45	January 14	3–2	Montreal Canadiens	Hextall	27–13–5	59	W
46	January 21	3–3 OT	Dallas Stars	Hextall	27–13–6	60	T
47	January 22	2–2 OT	@ Detroit Red Wings	Hextall	27–13–7	61	T
48	January 25	1–4	Detroit Red Wings	Hextall	27–14–7	61	L
49	January 28	4–1	Phoenix Coyotes	Snow	28–14–7	63	W
50	January 29	2–1	@ Washington Capitals	Hextall	29–14–7	65	W

February: 7–3–2, 16 points (home: 4–1–2; road: 3–2–0)

Game	Date	Score	Opponent	Decision	Record	Points	Recap
51	February 1	2–4	New York Rangers	Hextall	29–15–7	65	L
52	February 4	1–1 OT	Buffalo Sabres	Snow	29–15–8	66	T
53	February 6	9–5	Montreal Canadiens	Hextall	30–15–8	68	W
54	February 8	2–4	@ New Jersey Devils	Hextall	30–16–8	68	L
55	February 13	4–2	Ottawa Senators	Snow	31–16–8	70	W
56	February 15	5–1	Pittsburgh Penguins	Hextall	32–16–8	72	W
57	February 16	6–2	@ Pittsburgh Penguins	Snow	33–16–8	74	W
58	February 19	2–2 OT	Hartford Whalers	Snow	33–16–9	75	T
59	February 20	2–5	@ Tampa Bay Lightning	Hextall	33–17–9	75	L
60	February 22	4–3 OT	@ Florida Panthers	Snow	34–17–9	77	W
61	February 23	2–1	New York Rangers	Snow	35–17–9	79	W
62	February 26	8–5	@ Ottawa Senators	Snow	36–17–9	81	W

March: 7–5–2, 16 points (home: 3–2–0; road: 4–3–2)

Game	Date	Score	Opponent	Decision	Record	Points	Recap
63	March 1	5–5 OT	@ Boston Bruins	Hextall	36–17–10	82	T
64	March 2	5–2	@ Hartford Whalers	Snow	37–17–10	84	W
65	March 5	1–3	New Jersey Devils	Snow	37–18–10	84	L
66	March 8	2–3 OT	@ Pittsburgh Penguins	Snow	37–19–10	84	L
67	March 9	5–0	Washington Capitals	Hextall	38–19–10	86	W
68	March 11	2–3 OT	@ Buffalo Sabres	Hextall	38–20–10	86	L
69	March 13	5–4 OT	Edmonton Oilers	Snow	39–20–10	88	W
70	March 15	5–7	Buffalo Sabres	Snow	39–21–10	88	L
71	March 19	6–3	@ Toronto Maple Leafs	Hextall	40–21–10	90	W
72	March 22	3–3 OT	@ New York Islanders	Snow	40–21–11	91	T
73	March 23	2–0	Colorado Avalanche	Hextall	41–21–11	93	W
74	March 25	4–3	@ New Jersey Devils	Hextall	42–21–11	95	W
75	March 29	5–3	@ Washington Capitals	Hextall	43–21–11	97	W
76	March 30	2–3	@ St. Louis Blues	Hextall	43–22–11	97	L

April: 2–2–2, 6 points (home: 2–1–1; road: 0–1–1)

Game	Date	Score	Opponent	Decision	Record	Points	Recap
77	April 1	1–1 OT	Tampa Bay Lightning	Hextall	43–22–12	98	T
78	April 6	2–1	Ottawa Senators	Hextall	44–22–12	100	W
79	April 7	2–3	@ New York Rangers	Hextall	44–23–12	100	L
80	April 10	3–6	New York Rangers	Hextall	44–24–12	100	L
81	April 12	3–3 OT	@ Montreal Canadiens	Snow	44–24–13	101	T
82	April 13	5–4	New Jersey Devils	Snow	45–24–13	103	W

Legend: W Win (2 points) L Loss (0 points) T Tie (1 point)

=== Playoffs ===
1997 Stanley Cup playoffs
Eastern Conference quarterfinals vs. Pittsburgh Penguins – Flyers win 4–1

Game	Date	Score	Opponent	Decision	Series	Recap
1	April 17	5–1	Pittsburgh Penguins	Snow	Flyers lead 1–0	W
2	April 19	3–2	Pittsburgh Penguins	Snow	Flyers lead 2–0	W
3	April 21	5–3	@ Pittsburgh Penguins	Snow	Flyers lead 3–0	W
4	April 23	1–4	@ Pittsburgh Penguins	Snow	Flyers lead 3–1	L
5	April 26	6–3	Pittsburgh Penguins	Snow	Flyers win 4–1	W

Eastern Conference semifinals vs. Buffalo Sabres – Flyers win 4–1

Game	Date	Score	Opponent	Decision	Series	Recap
1	May 3	5–3	@ Buffalo Sabres	Snow	Flyers lead 1–0	W
2	May 5	2–1	@ Buffalo Sabres	Snow	Flyers lead 2–0	W
3	May 7	4–1	Buffalo Sabres	Snow	Flyers lead 3–0	W
4	May 9	4–5 OT	Buffalo Sabres	Snow	Flyers lead 3–1	L
5	May 11	6–3	@ Buffalo Sabres	Hextall	Flyers win 4–1	W

Eastern Conference finals vs. New York Rangers – Flyers win 4–1

Game	Date	Score	Opponent	Decision	Series	Recap
1	May 16	3–1	New York Rangers	Snow	Flyers lead 1–0	W
2	May 18	4–5	New York Rangers	Snow	Series tied 1–1	L
3	May 20	6–3	@ New York Rangers	Hextall	Flyers lead 2–1	W
4	May 23	3–2	@ New York Rangers	Hextall	Flyers lead 3–1	W
5	May 25	4–2	New York Rangers	Hextall	Flyers win 4–1	W

Stanley Cup Final vs. Detroit Red Wings – Red Wings win 4–0

Game	Date	Score	Opponent	Decision	Series	Recap
1	May 31	2–4	Detroit Red Wings	Hextall	Red Wings lead 1–0	L
2	June 3	2–4	Detroit Red Wings	Snow	Red Wings lead 2–0	L
3	June 5	1–6	@ Detroit Red Wings	Hextall	Red Wings lead 3–0	L
4	June 7	1–2	@ Detroit Red Wings	Hextall	Red Wings win 4–0	L

Legend: W Win L Loss

== Player statistics ==
=== Scoring ===
- Position abbreviations: C = Center; D = Defense; G = Goaltender; LW = Left wing; RW = Right wing
- † = Joined team via a transaction (e.g., trade, waivers, signing) during the season. Stats reflect time with the Flyers only.
- ‡ = Left team via a transaction (e.g., trade, waivers, release) during the season. Stats reflect time with the Flyers only.

No.	Player	Pos	Regular season						Playoffs					
No.	Player	Pos	GP	G	A	Pts	+/-	PIM	GP	G	A	Pts	+/-	PIM
10	John LeClair	LW	82	50	47	97	44	58	19	9	12	21	5	10
88	Eric Lindros	C	52	32	47	79	31	136	19	12	14	26	7	40
17	Rod Brind'Amour	C	82	27	32	59	2	41	19	13	8	21	9	10
19	Mikael Renberg	RW	77	22	37	59	36	65	18	5	6	11	1	4
37	Eric Desjardins	D	82	12	34	46	25	50	19	2	8	10	9	12
20	Trent Klatt	RW	76	24	21	45	9	20	19	4	3	7	1	12
44	Janne Niinimaa	D	77	4	40	44	12	58	19	1	12	13	3	16
18	Dale Hawerchuk	C	51	12	22	34	9	32	17	2	5	7	−2	0
25	Shjon Podein	LW	82	14	18	32	7	41	19	4	3	7	4	16
29	Joel Otto	C	78	13	19	32	12	99	18	1	5	6	3	8
77	Paul Coffey†	D	37	6	20	26	11	20	17	1	8	9	−3	6
6	Chris Therien	D	71	2	22	24	27	64	19	1	6	7	14	6
15	Pat Falloon	RW	52	11	12	23	−8	10	14	3	1	4	−1	2
9 (Note: Zubrus wore number 42 in his first game.)	Dainius Zubrus	LW	68	8	13	21	3	22	19	5	4	9	3	12
24	Karl Dykhuis	D	62	4	15	19	6	35	18	0	3	3	1	2
26	John Druce	RW	43	7	8	15	−5	12	13	1	0	1	2	2
45	Vaclav Prospal	C	18	5	10	15	3	4	5	1	3	4	0	4
23	Petr Svoboda	D	67	2	12	14	10	94	16	1	2	3	4	16
32	Daniel Lacroix	C	74	7	1	8	−1	163	12	0	1	1	0	22
22 (Note: Daniels wore number 8 in his first two games.)	Scott Daniels	RW	56	5	3	8	2	237	—	—	—	—	—	—
28	Kjell Samuelsson	D	34	4	3	7	17	47	5	0	0	0	−3	2
11	Craig Darby	C	9	1	4	5	2	2	—	—	—	—	—	—
21	Dan Kordic	LW	75	1	4	5	−1	210	12	1	0	1	1	22
5	Kevin Haller‡	D	27	0	5	5	−1	37	—	—	—	—	—	—
8	Michel Petit†	D	20	0	3	3	2	51	3	0	0	0	−1	6
48	Colin Forbes	LW	3	1	0	1	0	0	3	0	0	0	0	0
34 (Note: Bowen wore number 8 in his first three games.)	Jason Bowen	D	4	0	1	1	1	8	—	—	—	—	—	—
3	Aris Brimanis	D	3	0	1	1	0	0	—	—	—	—	—	—
30	Garth Snow	G	35	0	1	1		30	12	0	2	2		11
38	Paul Healey	RW	2	0	0	0	0	2	—	—	—	—	—	—
27	Ron Hextall	G	55	0	0	0		43	8	0	0	0		0
2	Frantisek Kucera†	D	2	0	0	0	−2	2	—	—	—	—	—	—
5	Darren Rumble	D	10	0	0	0	−2	0	—	—	—	—	—	—

=== Goaltending ===
No.	Player	Regular season											Playoffs									
No.	Player	GP	GS	W	L	T	SA	GA	GAA	SV%	SO	TOI	GP	GS	W	L	SA	GA	GAA	SV%	SO	TOI
27	Ron Hextall	55	54	31	16	5	1285	132	2.56	.897	5	3,094	8	7	4	3	203	22	2.97	.892	0	444
30	Garth Snow	35	28	14	8	8	816	79	2.52	.903	2	1,884	12	12	8	4	305	33	2.83	.892	0	699

== Awards and records ==
=== Awards ===
Type	Award/honor	Recipient	Ref
League (annual)	Bud Ice Plus-Minus Award	John LeClair	
League (annual)	NHL All-Rookie Team	Janne Niinimaa (Defense)	
League (annual)	NHL second All-Star team	John LeClair (Left wing)	
League (in-season)	NHL All-Star Game selection	Paul Coffey	
League (in-season)	NHL All-Star Game selection	Dale Hawerchuk (Note: Selected by the Commissioner)	
League (in-season)	NHL All-Star Game selection	John LeClair	
League (in-season)	NHL All-Star Game selection	Eric Lindros	
League (in-season)	NHL Player of the Week	John LeClair (November 11)	
League (in-season)	NHL Player of the Week	Eric Lindros (December 16)	
Team	Barry Ashbee Trophy	Eric Desjardins	
Team	Bobby Clarke Trophy	John LeClair	
Team	Class Guy Award	Shjon Podein	
Team	Pelle Lindbergh Memorial Trophy	Trent Klatt	

=== Records ===
Among the team records set during the 1996–97 season was goaltender Ron Hextall tying a team record with nine consecutive wins from December 6 to January 7. During Hextall’s streak the team set two shutout streaks, going a team record 265 minutes and eight seconds without allowing a goal from December 12 to December 22, and recording four consecutive shutouts from December 14 to December 21 (tied during the 1998–99 season). On January 29, Rod Brind'Amour tied Rick MacLeish's team record for consecutive games played at 287. Brind'Amour's streak continued another two seasons until a fractured left foot during training camp caused him to miss the first 34 games of the 1999–2000 season, ending the streak at 484 games.

The Legion of Doom line of Eric Lindros, John LeClair, and Mikael Renberg had two record setting games in February. On February 6 against the Montreal Canadiens, the line combined for a team record 16 points (LeClair 6 points, Lindros 5, and Renberg 5) with LeClair tying a team regular season record with four goals in the game. Three weeks later on February 26 against the Ottawa Senators, the line again recorded a combined 16 points (Lindros 7 points, Renberg 5, and LeClair 4) with Lindros setting the team records for assists in a single game (6) and a single period (4, later tied). Lindros also tied the team record for points in a single period (4). On March 19, Lindros tied the team regular season record for goals scored in a game (4) and tied the team record for goals in a period (3). Janne Niinimaa’s 40 assists on the season set a team record for rookie defensemen.

During game three of their conference quarterfinals series against the Pittsburgh Penguins, the Flyers set a franchise single period playoff record for most shots on goal (28). During game three, Rod Brind’Amour tied the NHL records for most shorthanded goals scored in a playoff game and playoff period (2 for both). Likewise, the two total shorthanded goals scored by the Flyers is also tied for the franchise single playoff game and playoff period records. John LeClair’s three game-winning goals during the series is a franchise single series high. During game three of their conference semifinals series against the Buffalo Sabres, defenseman Paul Coffey recorded three assists during the first period, tying the franchise single playoff period mark. Brind’Amour repeated Coffey’s feat during the second period of game five. The Flyers five consecutive playoff wins on the road from May 3 to May 23 tied a team record.

=== Milestones ===
Milestone	Player	Date	Ref
First game	Janne Niinimaa	October 5, 1996	
First game	Dainius Zubrus	October 5, 1996	
First game	Paul Healey	October 13, 1996	
First game	Vaclav Prospal	March 5, 1997	
First game	Colin Forbes	March 9, 1997	
500th game played	Ron Hextall	November 21, 1996	

== Transactions ==
The Flyers were involved in the following transactions from June 12, 1996, the day after the deciding game of the 1996 Stanley Cup Final, through June 7, 1997, the day of the deciding game of the 1997 Stanley Cup Final.

=== Trades ===
Date	Details		Ref
July 26, 1996	To Philadelphia Flyers: Frank Bialowas	To Washington Capitals: Future considerations	
December 15, 1996	To Philadelphia Flyers: Paul Coffey; 3rd-round pick in 1997	To Hartford Whalers: Kevin Haller; 1st-round pick in 1997; Hartford's 7th-round pick in 1997	
March 18, 1997	To Philadelphia Flyers: Frantisek Kucera	To Vancouver Canucks: Conditional 7th-round pick in 1997 (Note: Condition not met.)	

=== Players acquired ===
Date	Player	Former team	Term	Via	Ref
June 18, 1996	Scott Daniels	Hartford Whalers	3-year	Free agency	
July 9, 1996	Dominic Roussel	Winnipeg Jets	2-year	Free agency	
July 10, 1996	John Stevens	Springfield Falcons (AHL)		Free agency	
July 15, 1996	Daniel Lacroix	New York Rangers	2-year	Free agency	
July 17, 1996	Peter White	Toronto Maple Leafs		Free agency	
July 23, 1996	Steven King	Anaheim Mighty Ducks	1-year	Free agency	
October 1, 1996	Brett Bruininks	University of Notre Dame (CCHA)	1-year	Free agency	
October 3, 1996	Martin Boisvenue	Val-d'Or Foreurs (QMJHL)	multi-year	Free agency	
January 17, 1997	Michel Petit	Edmonton Oilers		Waivers	
May 28, 1997	Andy Delmore	Fredericton Canadiens (AHL)	multi-year	Free agency	

=== Players lost ===
Date	Player	New team	Via (Note: In parentheses is the player's free agency group on July 1 if applicable.)	Ref
July 4, 1996	Phil Crowe	Ottawa Senators	Free agency	
July 9, 1996	Shawn Antoski	Pittsburgh Penguins (Note: Antoski and Quinn signed with the Penguins on July 31, 1996.)	Release (UFA)	
July 9, 1996	Dan Quinn	Pittsburgh Penguins	Release	
July 24, 1996	Todd Nelson	Grand Rapids Griffins (IHL)	Free agency	
August 7, 1996	Russ Romaniuk	Manitoba Moose (IHL)	Free agency	
August 21, 1996	Tim Cheveldae	Boston Bruins	Free agency	
N/A	Jim Montgomery	Kolner Haie (DEL)	Free agency (UFA)	
September 30, 1996	Bob Corkum	Phoenix Coyotes	Waiver draft	
September 30, 1996	Rob DiMaio	San Jose Sharks	Waiver draft	
October 12, 1996	Kerry Huffman	Las Vegas Thunder (IHL)	Free agency (UFA)	

=== Signings ===
Date	Player	Term	Contract type	Ref
June 18, 1996	Janne Niinimaa	2-year	Entry-level	
June 18, 1996	Trent Klatt	2-year	Re-signing	
July 31, 1996	Brian Wesenberg	1-year	Entry-level	
August 6, 1996	Karl Dykhuis	3-year	Re-signing	
August 15, 1996	Ron Hextall	3-year	Re-signing	
September 10, 1996	Petr Svoboda	4-year	Re-signing	
October 3, 1996	Dainius Zubrus	3-year	Entry-level	
October 10, 1996	Brian Boucher	3-year	Entry-level	

== Draft picks ==
Philadelphia's picks at the 1996 NHL entry draft, which was held at the Kiel Center in St. Louis, Missouri, on June 22, 1996. The Flyers traded their first-round pick, 24th overall, their fourth-round pick, 106th overall, and Martin Spanhel to the San Jose Sharks for Pat Falloon on September 20, 1995. They also traded their third-round pick, 78th overall, and their sixth-round pick, 157th overall, to the Colorado Avalanche for Garth Snow on July 12, 1995, and their ninth-round pick, 239th overall, to the Ottawa Senators for Kerry Huffman on March 19, 1996.

Round	Pick	Player	Position	Nationality	Team (league)	Notes
1	15	Dainius Zubrus	Right wing	Lithuania	Caledon Canadians (MJAHL)	(Note: The Flyers acquired the 15th overall pick from the Toronto Maple Leafs along with the Los Angeles Kings' 1996 fourth-round pick, 84th overall, and the Kings' 1997 second-round pick for Dmitri Yushkevich and the Flyers' second-round pick, 50th overall, on August 30, 1995. The Flyers traded the 1996 fourth-round pick back to the Kings for John Druce and the Kings' 1997 seventh-round pick on March 19, 1996.)
3	64	Chester Gallant	Right wing	Canada	Niagara Falls Thunder (OHL)	(Note: The Flyers traded Dominic Roussel to the Winnipeg Jets for Tim Cheveldae and the Jets' third-round pick, 64th overall, on February 17, 1996.)
5	124	Per-Ragnar Bergkvist	Goaltender	Sweden	Leksands IF (Elitserien)	(Note: The Flyers traded Rob Zettler to the Toronto Maple Leafs for the Maple Leafs' fifth-round pick, 124th overall, on July 8, 1995.)
5	133	Jesse Boulerice	Right wing	United States	Detroit Whalers (OHL)	
7	187	Roman Malov	Center	Russia	Avangard Omsk (RSL)	
8	213	Jeff Milleker	Center	Canada	Moose Jaw Warriors (WHL)	

== Farm teams ==
The Flyers were affiliated with the Philadelphia Phantoms of the AHL and the Mobile Mysticks of the ECHL.
