= 1996–97 New York Rangers season =

NHL hockey team season

1996–97 New York Rangers
- Division: 4th Atlantic
- Conference: 5th Eastern
- 1996–97 record: 38–34–10
- Home record: 21–14–6
- Road record: 17–20–4
- Goals for: 258
- Goals against: 231

Team information
- General manager: Neil Smith
- Coach: Colin Campbell
- Captain: Mark Messier
- Alternate captains: Brian Leetch; Adam Graves
- Arena: Madison Square Garden
- Average attendance: 18,200 (100%)
- Minor league affiliates: Binghamton Rangers; Charlotte Checkers

Team leaders
- Goals: Mark Messier (36)
- Assists: Wayne Gretzky (72)
- Points: Wayne Gretzky (97)
- Penalty minutes: Darren Langdon (195)
- Plus/minus: Brian Leetch (+31)
- Wins: Mike Richter (33)
- Goals against average: Glenn Healy (2.61)

The 1996–97 New York Rangers season was the franchise's 71st season. The highlight of the season was that it was Wayne Gretzky's first season in New York.

The Rangers qualified for the playoffs as the fifth seed in the Eastern Conference, and advanced all the way to the Eastern Conference Finals, where they were defeated by the Philadelphia Flyers. This marked the last playoff appearance for the Rangers until the 2005–06 season.

== Regular season ==
The Rangers had the fewest power-play opportunities during the regular season (287), but the best power-play percentage (21.95%).

=== Final standings ===
Atlantic Division
| No. | CR | | GP | W | L | T | GF | GA | Pts |
|---|---|---|---|---|---|---|---|---|---|
| 1 | 1 | **New Jersey Devils** | 82 | 45 | 23 | 14 | 231 | 182 | 104 |
| 2 | 3 | **Philadelphia Flyers** | 82 | 45 | 24 | 13 | 274 | 217 | 103 |
| 3 | 4 | **Florida Panthers** | 82 | 35 | 28 | 19 | 221 | 201 | 89 |
| 4 | 5 | **New York Rangers** | 82 | 38 | 34 | 10 | 258 | 231 | 86 |
| 5 | 9 | Washington Capitals | 82 | 33 | 40 | 9 | 214 | 231 | 75 |
| 6 | 11 | Tampa Bay Lightning | 82 | 32 | 40 | 10 | 217 | 247 | 74 |
| 7 | 12 | New York Islanders | 82 | 29 | 41 | 12 | 240 | 250 | 70 |

Eastern Conference
| R | | Div | GP | W | L | T | GF | GA | Pts |
|---|---|---|---|---|---|---|---|---|---|
| **1** | **New Jersey Devils** | **ATL** | **82** | **45** | **23** | **14** | **231** | **182** | **104** |
| **2** | **Buffalo Sabres** | **NE** | **82** | **40** | **30** | **12** | **237** | **208** | **92** |
| **3** | **Philadelphia Flyers** | **ATL** | **82** | **45** | **24** | **13** | **274** | **217** | **103** |
| **4** | **Florida Panthers** | **ATL** | **82** | **35** | **28** | **19** | **221** | **201** | **89** |
| **5** | **New York Rangers** | **ATL** | **82** | **38** | **34** | **10** | **258** | **231** | **86** |
| **6** | **Pittsburgh Penguins** | **NE** | **82** | **38** | **36** | **8** | **285** | **280** | **84** |
| **7** | **Ottawa Senators** | **NE** | **82** | **31** | **36** | **15** | **226** | **234** | **77** |
| **8** | **Montreal Canadiens** | **NE** | **82** | **31** | **36** | **15** | **249** | **276** | **77** |
| 9 | Washington Capitals | ATL | 82 | 33 | 40 | 9 | 214 | 231 | 75 |
| 10 | Hartford Whalers | NE | 82 | 32 | 39 | 11 | 226 | 256 | 75 |
| 11 | Tampa Bay Lightning | ATL | 82 | 32 | 40 | 10 | 217 | 247 | 74 |
| 12 | New York Islanders | ATL | 82 | 29 | 41 | 12 | 240 | 250 | 70 |
| 13 | Boston Bruins | NE | 82 | 26 | 47 | 9 | 234 | 300 | 61 |

Divisions: ATL – Atlantic, NE – Northeast

bold – Qualified for playoffs

== Schedule and results ==
=== Regular season ===
1996–97 regular season
October: 5–6–3 (home: 4–3–1; road: 1–3–2)

| Game | Date | Opponent | Score | Record | Recap |
|---|---|---|---|---|---|
| 1 | October 5, 1996 | @ Boston Bruins | 4–4 OT | 0–0–1 | T |
| 2 | October 6, 1996 | Florida Panthers | 5–2 | 0–1–1 | L |
| 3 | October 8, 1996 | @ Florida Panthers | 1–1 OT | 0–1–2 | T |
| 4 | October 10, 1996 | Dallas Stars | 2–1 | 0–2–2 | L |
| 5 | October 12, 1996 | @ Montreal Canadiens | 5–2 | 0–3–2 | L |
| 6 | October 14, 1996 | Calgary Flames | 5–4 | 1–3–2 | W |
| 7 | October 16, 1996 | Pittsburgh Penguins | 8–1 | 2–3–2 | W |
| 8 | October 18, 1996 | St. Louis Blues | 2–1 | 3–3–2 | W |
| 9 | October 20, 1996 | @ Tampa Bay Lightning | 5–2 | 3–4–2 | L |
| 10 | October 23, 1996 | Washington Capitals | 3–2 | 3–5–2 | L |
| 11 | October 25, 1996 | @ Florida Panthers | 6–4 | 3–6–2 | L |
| 12 | October 27, 1996 | Buffalo Sabres | 6–4 | 4–6–2 | W |
| 13 | October 29, 1996 | Florida Panthers | 1–1 OT | 4–6–3 | T |
| 14 | October 30, 1996 | @ New Jersey Devils | 6–1 | 5–6–3 | W |

November: 4–7–1 (home: 0–3–0; road: 4–4–1)

| Game | Date | Opponent | Score | Record | Recap |
|---|---|---|---|---|---|
| 15 | November 2, 1996 | @ Boston Bruins | 5–2 | 6–6–3 | W |
| 16 | November 4, 1996 | Tampa Bay Lightning | 5–3 | 6–7–3 | L |
| 17 | November 6, 1996 | @ New York Islanders | 1–1 OT | 6–7–4 | T |
| 18 | November 9, 1996 | @ Washington Capitals | 3–2 | 6–8–4 | L |
| 19 | November 11, 1996 | Vancouver Canucks | 3–2 | 6–9–4 | L |
| 20 | November 13, 1996 | Philadelphia Flyers | 2–1 | 6–10–4 | L |
| 21 | November 16, 1996 | @ Pittsburgh Penguins | 8–3 | 7–10–4 | W |
| 22 | November 18, 1996 | @ Calgary Flames | 5–3 | 7–11–4 | L |
| 23 | November 21, 1996 | @ Edmonton Oilers | 3–2 | 7–12–4 | L |
| 24 | November 23, 1996 | @ Vancouver Canucks | 5–3 | 7–13–4 | L |
| 25 | November 26, 1996 | @ Phoenix Coyotes | 3–1 | 8–13–4 | W |
| 26 | November 27, 1996 | @ Colorado Avalanche | 5–2 | 9–13–4 | W |

December: 11–3–1 (home: 7–1–1; road: 4–2–0)

| Game | Date | Opponent | Score | Record | Recap |
|---|---|---|---|---|---|
| 27 | December 1, 1996 | Montreal Canadiens | 6–2 | 10–13–4 | W |
| 28 | December 4, 1996 | Philadelphia Flyers | 1–1 OT | 10–13–5 | T |
| 29 | December 6, 1996 | Toronto Maple Leafs | 6–5 | 11–13–5 | W |
| 30 | December 7, 1996 | @ Toronto Maple Leafs | 4–0 | 12–13–5 | W |
| 31 | December 9, 1996 | Phoenix Coyotes | 5–2 | 13–13–5 | W |
| 32 | December 11, 1996 | New York Islanders | 5–3 | 13–14–5 | L |
| 33 | December 13, 1996 | @ Buffalo Sabres | 3–0 | 14–14–5 | W |
| 34 | December 16, 1996 | Hartford Whalers | 5–2 | 15–14–5 | W |
| 35 | December 18, 1996 | Los Angeles Kings | 4–0 | 16–14–5 | W |
| 36 | December 21, 1996 | @ Montreal Canadiens | 3–2 OT | 17–14–5 | W |
| 37 | December 22, 1996 | Florida Panthers | 7–3 | 18–14–5 | W |
| 38 | December 26, 1996 | @ Ottawa Senators | 5–2 | 18–15–5 | L |
| 39 | December 27, 1996 | Mighty Ducks of Anaheim | 3–2 | 19–15–5 | W |
| 40 | December 30, 1996 | @ Dallas Stars | 3–2 | 20–15–5 | W |
| 41 | December 31, 1996 | @ Tampa Bay Lightning | 4–2 | 20–16–5 | L |

January: 5–4–2 (home: 3–3–2; road: 2–1–0)

| Game | Date | Opponent | Score | Record | Recap |
|---|---|---|---|---|---|
| 42 | January 2, 1997 | New York Islanders | 4–3 | 21–16–5 | W |
| 43 | January 4, 1997 | Ottawa Senators | 6–4 | 22–16–5 | W |
| 44 | January 6, 1997 | Colorado Avalanche | 2–2 OT | 22–16–6 | T |
| 45 | January 8, 1997 | Tampa Bay Lightning | 4–3 | 22–17–6 | L |
| 46 | January 9, 1997 | @ Washington Capitals | 2–0 | 22–18–6 | L |
| 47 | January 12, 1997 | New Jersey Devils | 3–0 | 23–18–6 | W |
| 48 | January 13, 1997 | New York Islanders | 4–2 | 23–19–6 | L |
| 49 | January 21, 1997 | Edmonton Oilers | 4–4 OT | 23–19–7 | T |
| 50 | January 22, 1997 | @ Washington Capitals | 5–3 | 24–19–7 | W |
| 51 | January 25, 1997 | @ Pittsburgh Penguins | 7–4 | 25–19–7 | W |
| 52 | January 27, 1997 | Chicago Blackhawks | 2–1 | 25–20–7 | L |

February: 3–6–2 (home: 1–1–1; road: 2–5–1)

| Game | Date | Opponent | Score | Record | Recap |
|---|---|---|---|---|---|
| 53 | February 1, 1997 | @ Philadelphia Flyers | 4–2 | 26–20–7 | W |
| 54 | February 2, 1997 | Boston Bruins | 3–2 | 26–21–7 | L |
| 55 | February 5, 1997 | Hartford Whalers | 5–2 | 27–21–7 | W |
| 56 | February 8, 1997 | @ New York Islanders | 5–2 | 28–21–7 | W |
| 57 | February 9, 1997 | @ Florida Panthers | 4–3 | 28–22–7 | L |
| 58 | February 13, 1997 | @ St. Louis Blues | 4–1 | 28–23–7 | L |
| 59 | February 15, 1997 | @ Chicago Blackhawks | 2–0 | 28–24–7 | L |
| 60 | February 17, 1997 | New Jersey Devils | 2–2 OT | 28–24–8 | T |
| 61 | February 19, 1997 | @ New Jersey Devils | 1–1 OT | 28–24–9 | T |
| 62 | February 21, 1997 | @ Hartford Whalers | 7–2 | 28–25–9 | L |
| 63 | February 23, 1997 | @ Philadelphia Flyers | 2–1 | 28–26–9 | L |

March: 7–6–0 (home: 4–2–0; road: 3–4–0)

| Game | Date | Opponent | Score | Record | Recap |
|---|---|---|---|---|---|
| 64 | March 1, 1997 | @ Detroit Red Wings | 3–0 | 28–27–9 | L |
| 65 | March 3, 1997 | San Jose Sharks | 5–4 OT | 29–27–9 | W |
| 66 | March 6, 1997 | @ Los Angeles Kings | 6–2 | 30–27–9 | W |
| 67 | March 7, 1997 | @ Mighty Ducks of Anaheim | 5–2 | 30–28–9 | L |
| 68 | March 9, 1997 | @ San Jose Sharks | 2–1 | 31–28–9 | W |
| 69 | March 12, 1997 | Washington Capitals | 3–2 | 32–28–9 | W |
| 70 | March 14, 1997 | @ Ottawa Senators | 4–3 OT | 33–28–9 | W |
| 71 | March 17, 1997 | Ottawa Senators | 4–3 | 33–29–9 | L |
| 72 | March 19, 1997 | Montreal Canadiens | 5–4 | 33–30–9 | L |
| 73 | March 21, 1997 | Detroit Red Wings | 3–1 | 34–30–9 | W |
| 74 | March 24, 1997 | Pittsburgh Penguins | 3–0 | 35–30–9 | W |
| 75 | March 27, 1997 | @ New Jersey Devils | 4–0 | 35–31–9 | L |
| 76 | March 29, 1997 | @ Hartford Whalers | 2–1 | 35–32–9 | L |

April: 3–2–1 (home: 2–1–1; road: 1–1–0)

| Game | Date | Opponent | Score | Record | Recap |
|---|---|---|---|---|---|
| 77 | April 1, 1997 | Buffalo Sabres | 1–1 OT | 35–32–10 | T |
| 78 | April 3, 1997 | Boston Bruins | 5–4 | 36–32–10 | W |
| 79 | April 4, 1997 | @ Buffalo Sabres | 5–1 | 36–33–10 | L |
| 80 | April 7, 1997 | Philadelphia Flyers | 3–2 | 37–33–10 | W |
| 81 | April 10, 1997 | @ Philadelphia Flyers | 6–3 | 38–33–10 | W |
| 82 | April 11, 1997 | Tampa Bay Lightning | 4–2 | 38–34–10 | L |

Legend: W Win (2 points) L Loss (0 points) T Tie (1 point)

=== Playoffs ===
1997 Stanley Cup playoffs
Eastern Conference Quarterfinals vs. (4) Florida Panthers – Rangers win 4–1

| Game | Date | Opponent | Score | Series | Recap |
|---|---|---|---|---|---|
| 1 | April 17, 1997 | @ Florida Panthers | 3–0 | Panthers lead 1–0 | L |
| 2 | April 20, 1997 | @ Florida Panthers | 3–0 | Series tied 1–1 | W |
| 3 | April 22, 1997 | Florida Panthers | 4–3 OT | Rangers lead 2–1 | W |
| 4 | April 23, 1997 | Florida Panthers | 3–2 | Rangers lead 3–1 | W |
| 5 | April 25, 1997 | @ Florida Panthers | 3–2 OT | Rangers win 4–1 | W |

Eastern Conference Semifinals vs. (1) New Jersey Devils – Rangers win 4–1

| Game | Date | Opponent | Score | Series | Recap |
|---|---|---|---|---|---|
| 1 | May 2, 1997 | @ New Jersey Devils | 2–0 | Devils lead 1–0 | L |
| 2 | May 4, 1997 | @ New Jersey Devils | 2–0 | Series tied 1–1 | W |
| 3 | May 6, 1997 | New Jersey Devils | 3–2 | Rangers lead 2–1 | W |
| 4 | May 8, 1997 | New Jersey Devils | 3–0 | Rangers lead 3–1 | W |
| 5 | May 11, 1997 | @ New Jersey Devils | 2–1 OT | Rangers win 4–1 | W |

Eastern Conference Finals vs. (3) Philadelphia Flyers – Flyers win 4–1

| Game | Date | Opponent | Score | Series | Recap |
|---|---|---|---|---|---|
| 1 | May 16, 1997 | @ Philadelphia Flyers | 3–1 | Flyers lead 1–0 | L |
| 2 | May 18, 1997 | @ Philadelphia Flyers | 5–4 | Series tied 1–1 | W |
| 3 | May 20, 1997 | Philadelphia Flyers | 6–3 | Flyers lead 2–1 | L |
| 4 | May 23, 1997 | Philadelphia Flyers | 3–2 | Flyers lead 3–1 | L |
| 5 | May 25, 1997 | @ Philadelphia Flyers | 4–2 | Flyers win 4–1 | L |

Legend: W Win L Loss

== Player statistics ==
=== Scoring ===
- Position abbreviations: C = Center; D = Defense; G = Goaltender; LW = Left wing; RW = Right wing
- † = Joined team via a transaction (e.g., trade, waivers, signing) during the season. Stats reflect time with the Rangers only.
- ‡ = Left team via a transaction (e.g., trade, waivers, release) during the season. Stats reflect time with the Rangers only.

| No. | Player | Pos | Regular season | | | | | | Playoffs | | | | | |
| No. | Player | Pos | GP | G | A | Pts | +/- | PIM | GP | G | A | Pts | +/- | PIM |
|---|---|---|---|---|---|---|---|---|---|---|---|---|---|---|
| 99 | Wayne Gretzky | C | 82 | 25 | 72 | 97 | 12 | 28 | 15 | 10 | 10 | 20 | 5 | 2 |
| 11 | Mark Messier | C | 71 | 36 | 48 | 84 | 12 | 88 | 15 | 3 | 9 | 12 | 2 | 6 |
| 2 | Brian Leetch | D | 82 | 20 | 58 | 78 | 31 | 40 | 15 | 2 | 8 | 10 | 5 | 6 |
| 9 | Adam Graves | LW | 82 | 33 | 28 | 61 | 10 | 66 | 15 | 2 | 1 | 3 | 1 | 12 |
| 24 | Niklas Sundstrom | RW | 82 | 24 | 28 | 52 | 23 | 20 | 9 | 0 | 5 | 5 | 3 | 2 |
| 20 | Luc Robitaille | LW | 69 | 24 | 24 | 48 | 16 | 48 | 15 | 4 | 7 | 11 | 7 | 4 |
| 25 | Alexander Karpovtsev | D | 77 | 9 | 29 | 38 | 1 | 59 | 13 | 1 | 3 | 4 | 2 | 20 |
| 27 | Alexei Kovalev | RW | 45 | 13 | 22 | 35 | 11 | 42 | — | — | — | — | — | — |
| 33 | Bruce Driver | D | 79 | 5 | 25 | 30 | 8 | 48 | 15 | 0 | 1 | 1 | −3 | 2 |
| 8 (Note: Flatley wore number 26 on February 5.) | Patrick Flatley | RW | 68 | 10 | 12 | 22 | 6 | 26 | 11 | 0 | 0 | 0 | 2 | 14 |
| 13 | Sergei Nemchinov‡ | C | 63 | 6 | 13 | 19 | 5 | 12 | — | — | — | — | — | — |
| 5 | Ulf Samuelsson | D | 73 | 6 | 11 | 17 | 3 | 138 | 15 | 0 | 2 | 2 | 1 | 30 |
| 28 | Brian Noonan†‡ | RW | 44 | 6 | 9 | 15 | −7 | 28 | — | — | — | — | — | — |
| 18 | Bill Berg | LW | 67 | 8 | 6 | 14 | 2 | 37 | 3 | 0 | 0 | 0 | −1 | 2 |
| 16 | Daniel Goneau | LW | 41 | 10 | 3 | 13 | −5 | 10 | — | — | — | — | — | — |
| 23 | Jeff Beukeboom | D | 80 | 3 | 9 | 12 | 22 | 167 | 15 | 0 | 1 | 1 | 5 | 34 |
| 39 | Vladimir Vorobiev | RW | 16 | 5 | 5 | 10 | 4 | 6 | — | — | — | — | — | — |
| 15 | Darren Langdon | LW | 60 | 3 | 6 | 9 | −1 | 195 | 10 | 0 | 0 | 0 | −1 | 2 |
| 32 | Mike Eastwood† | C | 27 | 1 | 7 | 8 | 2 | 10 | 15 | 1 | 2 | 3 | 0 | 22 |
| 6 | Doug Lidster | D | 48 | 3 | 4 | 7 | 10 | 24 | 15 | 1 | 5 | 6 | −2 | 8 |
| 21 | Russ Courtnall† | RW | 14 | 2 | 5 | 7 | −3 | 2 | 15 | 3 | 4 | 7 | 1 | 0 |
| 26 | David Oliver† | RW | 14 | 2 | 1 | 3 | 3 | 4 | 3 | 0 | 0 | 0 | 0 | 0 |
| 10 | Esa Tikkanen† | C | 14 | 1 | 2 | 3 | 0 | 6 | 15 | 9 | 3 | 12 | 2 | 26 |
| 19 | Christian Dube | C | 27 | 1 | 1 | 2 | −4 | 4 | 3 | 0 | 0 | 0 | −2 | 0 |
| 14 | Chris Ferraro | RW | 12 | 1 | 1 | 2 | 1 | 6 | — | — | — | — | — | — |
| 37 | Ryan VandenBussche | RW | 11 | 1 | 0 | 1 | −2 | 30 | — | — | — | — | — | — |
| 29 | Eric Cairns | D | 40 | 0 | 1 | 1 | −7 | 147 | 3 | 0 | 0 | 0 | 0 | 0 |
| 22 | Shane Churla | RW | 45 | 0 | 1 | 1 | −10 | 106 | 15 | 0 | 0 | 0 | −3 | 20 |
| 21 | Jayson More‡ | D | 14 | 0 | 1 | 1 | 0 | 25 | — | — | — | — | — | — |
| 38 (Note: Blouin wore number 32 in his first five games.) | Sylvain Blouin | D | 6 | 0 | 0 | 0 | −1 | 18 | — | — | — | — | — | — |
| 28 | Dallas Eakins† | D | 3 | 0 | 0 | 0 | −1 | 6 | 4 | 0 | 0 | 0 | −1 | 4 |
| 17 | Peter Ferraro | C | 2 | 0 | 0 | 0 | 0 | 0 | 2 | 0 | 0 | 0 | 0 | 0 |
| 30 | Glenn Healy | G | 23 | 0 | 0 | 0 | | 4 | — | — | — | — | — | — |
| 32 | Sergio Momesso‡ | LW | 9 | 0 | 0 | 0 | −2 | 11 | — | — | — | — | — | — |
| 36 | Jeff Nielsen | RW | 2 | 0 | 0 | 0 | −1 | 2 | — | — | — | — | — | — |
| 35 | Mike Richter | G | 61 | 0 | 0 | 0 | | 4 | 15 | 0 | 1 | 1 | | 0 |
| 12 | Ken Gernander | C | — | — | — | — | — | — | 9 | 0 | 0 | 0 | 0 | 0 |

=== Goaltending ===
| No. | Player | Regular season | | | | | | | | | | Playoffs | | | | | | | | |
| No. | Player | GP | W | L | T | SA | GA | GAA | SV% | SO | TOI | GP | W | L | SA | GA | GAA | SV% | SO | TOI |
|---|---|---|---|---|---|---|---|---|---|---|---|---|---|---|---|---|---|---|---|---|
| 35 | Mike Richter | 61 | 33 | 22 | 6 | 1945 | 161 | 2.69 | .917 | 4 | 3598 | 15 | 9 | 6 | 488 | 33 | 2.11 | .932 | 3 | 939 |
| 30 | Glenn Healy | 23 | 5 | 12 | 4 | 632 | 59 | 2.61 | .907 | 1 | 1357 | — | — | — | — | — | — | — | — | — |

== Awards and records ==
=== Awards ===
| Type | Award/honor | Recipient | Ref |
|---|---|---|---|
| League (annual) | James Norris Memorial Trophy | Brian Leetch | |
| League (annual) | NHL First All-Star Team | Brian Leetch (Defense) | |
| League (annual) | NHL Second All-Star Team | Wayne Gretzky (Center) | |
| League (in-season) | NHL All-Star Game selection | Wayne Gretzky (Note: Gretzky and Leetch were voted to the starting lineup.) | |
| League (in-season) | NHL All-Star Game selection | Brian Leetch | |
| League (in-season) | NHL All-Star Game selection | Mark Messier | |
| Team | Ceil Saidel Memorial Award | Adam Graves | |
| Team | "Crumb Bum" Award | Mike Richter | |
| Team | Frank Boucher Trophy | Mark Messier | |
| Team | Good Guy Award | Wayne Gretzky | |
| Team | Lars-Erik Sjoberg Award | Eric Cairns | |
| Team | Players' Player Award | Darren Langdon | |
| Team | Rangers MVP | Brian Leetch | |
| Team | Steven McDonald Extra Effort Award | Brian Leetch | |

=== Milestones ===
| Milestone | Player | Date | Ref |
|---|---|---|---|
| First game | Daniel Goneau | October 5, 1996 | |
| First game | Eric Cairns | October 8, 1996 | |
| First game | Christian Dube | October 8, 1996 | |
| First game | Sylvain Blouin | November 18, 1996 | |
| First game | Ryan VandenBussche | December 13, 1996 | |
| First game | Vladimir Vorobiev | January 12, 1997 | |
| First game | Jeff Nielsen | February 19, 1997 | |

== Draft picks ==
New York's picks at the 1996 NHL entry draft in St. Louis, Missouri at the Kiel Center.

| Round | # | Player | Position | Nationality | College/Junior/Club team (League) |
|---|---|---|---|---|---|
| 1 | 22 | Jeff Brown | D | Canada | Sarnia Sting (OHL) |
| 2 | 48 | Daniel Goneau | LW | Canada | Granby Predateurs (QMJHL) |
| 3 | 76 | Dmitri Subbotin | LW | Russia | CSKA Moscow (Russia) |
| 5 | 131 | Colin Pepperall | LW | Canada | Niagara Falls Thunder (OHL) |
| 6 | 158 | Ola Sandberg | D | Sweden | Djurgårdens IF (SEL) |
| 7 | 185 | Jeff Dessner | D | United States | Taft School (Connecticut) |
| 8 | 211 | Ryan McKie | D | Canada | London Knights (OHL) |
| 9 | 237 | Ronnie Sundin | D | Sweden | Frölunda HC (SEL) |
