= 1996–97 Montreal Canadiens season =

NHL hockey team season

1996–97 Montreal Canadiens
- Division: 4th Northeast
- Conference: 8th Eastern
- 1996–97 record: 31–36–15
- Home record: 17–17–7
- Road record: 14–19–8
- Goals for: 249
- Goals against: 276

Team information
- General manager: Rejean Houle
- Coach: Mario Tremblay
- Captain: Pierre Turgeon (Oct.); Vincent Damphousse (Oct.–Apr.)
- Arena: Molson Centre
- Average attendance: 21,001 (98.7%)
- Minor league affiliates: Fredericton Canadiens; Wheeling Nailers

Team leaders
- Goals: Mark Recchi (34)
- Assists: Vincent Damphousse (54)
- Points: Vincent Damphousse (81)
- Penalty minutes: Scott Thornton (128)
- Plus/minus: Peter Popovic (+9)
- Wins: Jocelyn Thibault (22)
- Goals against average: Jocelyn Thibault (2.90)

The 1996–97 Montreal Canadiens season was the club's 88th season and the first full season at the Molson Centre. The Canadiens qualified for the playoffs despite a sub-.500 season. The Canadiens were eliminated in the Eastern Conference quarterfinals (the first round) by the New Jersey Devils 4 games to 1.

== Regular season ==
On Wednesday, October 16, 1996, the Canadiens scored three short-handed goals in a 4–2 win over the Calgary Flames.

Pierre Turgeon was traded on October 29, 1996, to the St. Louis Blues. Veteran forward Vincent Damphousse was named the new captain.

The Canadiens finished the regular season 26th in both power-play goals allowed (71) and penalty-killing percentage (79.54%).

=== Final standings ===
Northeast Division
No.	CR		GP	W	L	T	GF	GA	Pts
1	2	**Buffalo Sabres**	82	40	30	12	237	208	92
2	6	**Pittsburgh Penguins**	82	38	36	8	285	280	84
3	7	**Ottawa Senators**	82	31	36	15	226	234	77
4	8	**Montreal Canadiens**	82	31	36	15	249	276	77
5	10	Hartford Whalers	82	32	39	11	226	256	75
6	13	Boston Bruins	82	26	47	9	234	300	61

Eastern Conference
R		Div	GP	W	L	T	GF	GA	Pts
**1**	**New Jersey Devils**	**ATL**	**82**	**45**	**23**	**14**	**231**	**182**	**104**
**2**	**Buffalo Sabres**	**NE**	**82**	**40**	**30**	**12**	**237**	**208**	**92**
**3**	**Philadelphia Flyers**	**ATL**	**82**	**45**	**24**	**13**	**274**	**217**	**103**
**4**	**Florida Panthers**	**ATL**	**82**	**35**	**28**	**19**	**221**	**201**	**89**
**5**	**New York Rangers**	**ATL**	**82**	**38**	**34**	**10**	**258**	**231**	**86**
**6**	**Pittsburgh Penguins**	**NE**	**82**	**38**	**36**	**8**	**285**	**280**	**84**
**7**	**Ottawa Senators**	**NE**	**82**	**31**	**36**	**15**	**226**	**234**	**77**
**8**	**Montreal Canadiens**	**NE**	**82**	**31**	**36**	**15**	**249**	**276**	**77**
9	Washington Capitals	ATL	82	33	40	9	214	231	75
10	Hartford Whalers	NE	82	32	39	11	226	256	75
11	Tampa Bay Lightning	ATL	82	32	40	10	217	247	74
12	New York Islanders	ATL	82	29	41	12	240	250	70
13	Boston Bruins	NE	82	26	47	9	234	300	61

Divisions: ATL – Atlantic, NE – Northeast

bold – Qualified for playoffs

== Playoffs ==
In the first game of the series against New Jersey, on April 17, 1997, with the Devils up by two goals late in the game, Martin Brodeur fired the puck the length of the ice and into the Canadiens' empty net to ensure a 5-2 victory. It was only the second time in NHL history that a goaltender had scored in the playoffs, and the fifth time overall.

== Schedule and results ==
=== Regular season ===
1996–97 regular season
October: 4–5–2 (home: 4–1–2; road: 0–4–0)

Game	Date	Score	Opponent	Record	Recap
1	October 5, 1996	3–3 OT	Ottawa Senators	0–0–1	T
2	October 7, 1996	6–6 OT	Mighty Ducks of Anaheim	0–0–2	T
3	October 9, 1996	6–3	Los Angeles Kings	1–0–2	W
4	October 12, 1996	5–2	New York Rangers	2–0–2	W
5	October 15, 1996	2–3	@ New Jersey Devils	2–1–2	L
6	October 16, 1996	4–2	Calgary Flames	3–1–2	W
7	October 19, 1996	3–6	@ Ottawa Senators	3–2–2	L
8	October 24, 1996	3–6	@ Buffalo Sabres	3–3–2	L
9	October 26, 1996	6–5	Philadelphia Flyers	4–3–2	W
10	October 28, 1996	4–5 OT	Phoenix Coyotes	4–4–2	L
11	October 30, 1996	3–5	@ Detroit Red Wings	4–5–2	L

November: 6–7–2 (home: 3–2–0; road: 3–5–2)

Game	Date	Score	Opponent	Record	Recap
12	November 2, 1996	3–4 OT	@ San Jose Sharks	4–6–2	L
13	November 3, 1996	4–4 OT	@ Phoenix Coyotes	4–6–3	T
14	November 6, 1996	6–5	@ Mighty Ducks of Anaheim	5–6–3	W
15	November 7, 1996	1–4	@ Los Angeles Kings	5–7–3	L
16	November 9, 1996	2–5	@ Colorado Avalanche	5–8–3	L
17	November 11, 1996	3–2 OT	Edmonton Oilers	6–8–3	W
18	November 13, 1996	3–5	Florida Panthers	6–9–3	L
19	November 15, 1996	1–3	@ Washington Capitals	6–10–3	L
20	November 16, 1996	6–1	Vancouver Canucks	7–10–3	W
21	November 20, 1996	1–3	@ Hartford Whalers	7–11–3	L
22	November 21, 1996	6–2	@ Boston Bruins	8–11–3	W
23	November 23, 1996	4–3	@ Toronto Maple Leafs	9–11–3	W
24	November 25, 1996	4–2	Tampa Bay Lightning	10–11–3	W
25	November 27, 1996	2–2 OT	@ Pittsburgh Penguins	10–11–4	T
26	November 30, 1996	0–2	Washington Capitals	10–12–4	L

December: 3–6–3 (home: 1–5–0; road: 2–1–3)

Game	Date	Score	Opponent	Record	Recap
27	December 1, 1996	2–6	@ New York Rangers	10–13–4	L
28	December 4, 1996	3–4	Boston Bruins	10–14–4	L
29	December 6, 1996	3–1	@ Chicago Blackhawks	11–14–4	W
30	December 7, 1996	3–2	Chicago Blackhawks	12–14–4	W
31	December 11, 1996	2–3 OT	Buffalo Sabres	12–15–4	L
32	December 14, 1996	3–3 OT	@ New Jersey Devils	12–15–5	T
33	December 16, 1996	2–4	Tampa Bay Lightning	12–16–5	L
34	December 21, 1996	2–3 OT	New York Rangers	12–17–5	L
35	December 23, 1996	0–6	Ottawa Senators	12–18–5	L
36	December 26, 1996	3–3 OT	@ Pittsburgh Penguins	12–18–6	T
37	December 28, 1996	4–4 OT	@ Tampa Bay Lightning	12–18–7	T
38	December 29, 1996	2–1	@ Florida Panthers	13–18–7	W

January: 6–7–1 (home: 4–3–0; road: 2–4–1)

Game	Date	Score	Opponent	Record	Recap
39	January 1, 1997	6–4	@ Dallas Stars	14–18–7	W
40	January 2, 1997	2–2 OT	@ St. Louis Blues	14–18–8	T
41	January 4, 1997	3–1	New York Islanders	15–18–8	W
42	January 6, 1997	5–4	Hartford Whalers	16–18–8	W
43	January 9, 1997	4–5	@ Boston Bruins	16–19–8	L
44	January 11, 1997	6–3	Boston Bruins	17–19–8	W
45	January 13, 1997	1–2	Dallas Stars	17–20–8	L
46	January 14, 1997	2–3	@ Philadelphia Flyers	17–21–8	L
47	January 20, 1997	4–1	Detroit Red Wings	18–21–8	W
48	January 22, 1997	1–6	@ Buffalo Sabres	18–22–8	L
49	January 25, 1997	1–8	St. Louis Blues	18–23–8	L
50	January 26, 1997	2–5	Pittsburgh Penguins	18–24–8	L
51	January 28, 1997	1–5	@ Florida Panthers	18–25–8	L
52	January 30, 1997	4–1	@ Tampa Bay Lightning	19–25–8	W

February: 4–5–3 (home: 2–3–2; road: 2–2–1)

Game	Date	Score	Opponent	Record	Recap
53	February 1, 1997	4–4 OT	New Jersey Devils	19–25–9	T
54	February 3, 1997	2–2 OT	Florida Panthers	19–25–10	T
55	February 5, 1997	3–6	Pittsburgh Penguins	19–26–10	L
56	February 6, 1997	5–9	@ Philadelphia Flyers	19–27–10	L
57	February 8, 1997	3–2 OT	Hartford Whalers	20–27–10	W
58	February 10, 1997	4–2	San Jose Sharks	21–27–10	W
59	February 12, 1997	2–2 OT	@ Buffalo Sabres	21–27–11	T
60	February 15, 1997	1–4	New Jersey Devils	21–28–11	L
61	February 17, 1997	4–1	@ New York Islanders	22–28–11	W
62	February 22, 1997	1–5	Toronto Maple Leafs	22–29–11	L
63	February 25, 1997	4–2	@ Vancouver Canucks	23–29–11	W
64	February 28, 1997	2–3	@ Calgary Flames	23–30–11	L

March: 5–4–3 (home: 2–2–2; road: 3–2–1)

Game	Date	Score	Opponent	Record	Recap
65	March 1, 1997	5–4	@ Edmonton Oilers	24–30–11	W
66	March 5, 1997	3–7	Colorado Avalanche	24–31–11	L
67	March 7, 1997	0–2	@ Hartford Whalers	24–32–11	L
68	March 8, 1997	3–3 OT	Buffalo Sabres	24–32–12	T
69	March 10, 1997	2–2 OT	@ Pittsburgh Penguins	24–32–13	T
70	March 13, 1997	3–0	@ Boston Bruins	25–32–13	W
71	March 15, 1997	2–2 OT	Ottawa Senators	25–32–14	T
72	March 19, 1997	5–4	@ New York Rangers	26–32–14	W
73	March 22, 1997	1–3	Washington Capitals	26–33–14	L
74	March 24, 1997	3–1	Boston Bruins	27–33–14	W
75	March 26, 1997	8–5	Pittsburgh Penguins	28–33–14	W
76	March 29, 1997	2–5	@ Ottawa Senators	28–34–14	L

April: 3–2–1 (home: 1–1–1; road: 2–1–0)

Game	Date	Score	Opponent	Record	Recap
77	April 2, 1997	4–1	@ Hartford Whalers	29–34–14	W
78	April 5, 1997	1–4	Hartford Whalers	29–35–14	L
79	April 7, 1997	2–1	New York Islanders	30–35–14	W
80	April 9, 1997	3–1	@ New York Islanders	31–35–14	W
81	April 10, 1997	2–3	@ Washington Capitals	31–36–14	L
82	April 12, 1997	3–3 OT	Philadelphia Flyers	31–36–15	T

Legend: W Win (2 points) L Loss (0 points) T Tie (1 point)

=== Playoffs ===
1997 Stanley Cup playoffs
Eastern Conference Quarterfinals vs. (1) New Jersey Devils – Devils win 4–1

Game	Date	Score	Opponent	Series	Recap
1	April 17, 1997	2–5	@ New Jersey Devils	Devils lead 1–0	L
2	April 19, 1997	1–4	@ New Jersey Devils	Devils lead 2–0	L
3	April 22, 1997	4–6	New Jersey Devils	Devils lead 3–0	L
4	April 24, 1997	4–3 3OT	New Jersey Devils	Devils lead 3–1	W
5	April 26, 1997	0–4	@ New Jersey Devils	Devils win 4–1	L

Legend: W Win L Loss

== Player statistics ==
=== Scoring ===
- Position abbreviations: C = Centre; D = Defence; G = Goaltender; LW = Left wing; RW = Right wing
- † = Joined team via a transaction (e.g., trade, waivers, signing) during the season. Stats reflect time with the Canadiens only.
- ‡ = Left team via a transaction (e.g., trade, waivers, release) during the season. Stats reflect time with the Canadiens only.

No.	Player	Pos	Regular season						Playoffs					
No.	Player	Pos	GP	G	A	Pts	+/-	PIM	GP	G	A	Pts	+/-	PIM
25	Vincent Damphousse	C	82	27	54	81	−6	82	5	0	0	0	−5	2
8	Mark Recchi	RW	82	34	46	80	−1	58	5	4	2	6	2	2
49	Brian Savage	LW	81	23	37	60	−14	39	5	1	1	2	1	0
11	Saku Koivu	C	50	17	39	56	7	38	5	1	3	4	1	10
26	Martin Rucinsky	LW	70	28	27	55	1	62	5	0	0	0	−5	4
44	Stephane Richer	RW	63	22	24	46	0	32	5	0	0	0	−3	0
18	Valeri Bure	RW	64	14	21	35	4	6	5	0	1	1	−4	2
38	Vladimir Malakhov	D	65	10	20	30	3	43	5	0	0	0	−3	6
17	Benoit Brunet	LW	39	10	13	23	6	14	4	1	3	4	4	4
5	Stephane Quintal	D	71	7	15	22	1	100	5	0	1	1	−1	6
30	Turner Stevenson	RW	65	8	13	21	−14	97	5	1	1	2	1	2
27 (Note: Corson wore number 29 in his first six games.)	Shayne Corson†	LW	47	6	15	21	−5	80	5	1	0	1	−5	4
24	Scott Thornton	LW	73	10	10	20	−19	128	5	1	0	1	1	2
42	Darcy Tucker	RW	73	7	13	20	−5	110	4	0	0	0	0	0
28	Marc Bureau	C	43	6	9	15	4	16	—	—	—	—	—	—
3 (Note: Wilkie wore number 27 through November 9.)	David Wilkie	D	61	6	9	15	−9	63	2	0	0	0	0	2
43	Patrice Brisebois	D	49	2	13	15	−7	24	3	1	1	2	3	24
34	Peter Popovic	D	78	1	13	14	9	32	3	0	0	0	−3	2
71	Sebastien Bordeleau	C	28	2	9	11	−3	2	—	—	—	—	—	—
77	Pierre Turgeon‡	C	9	1	10	11	4	2	—	—	—	—	—	—
35	Jassen Cullimore†	D	49	2	6	8	4	42	2	0	0	0	−1	2
22	Chris Murray‡	RW	56	4	2	6	−8	114	—	—	—	—	—	—
36	Murray Baron†‡	D	60	1	5	6	−16	107	—	—	—	—	—	—
52	Craig Rivet	D	35	0	4	4	7	54	5	0	1	1	−2	14
37	Dave Manson†	D	9	1	1	2	−1	23	5	0	0	0	6	17
20	Eric Houde	C	13	0	2	2	1	2	—	—	—	—	—	—
53	Rory Fitzpatrick‡	D	6	0	1	1	−2	6	—	—	—	—	—	—
35	Donald Brashear‡	LW	10	0	0	0	−2	38	—	—	—	—	—	—
32	Brad Brown	D	8	0	0	0	−1	22	—	—	—	—	—	—
48	Francois Groleau	D	5	0	0	0	0	4	—	—	—	—	—	—
39	Pat Jablonski‡	G	17	0	0	0		0	—	—	—	—	—	—
51	David Ling†	RW	2	0	0	0	0	0	—	—	—	—	—	—
14	Terry Ryan	LW	3	0	0	0	0	0	—	—	—	—	—	—
15	Pierre Sevigny	LW	13	0	0	0	0	5	—	—	—	—	—	—
60	Jose Theodore	G	16	0	0	0		0	2	0	0	0		0
41	Jocelyn Thibault	G	61	0	0	0		0	3	0	0	0		0
37	Tomas Vokoun	G	1	0	0	0		0	—	—	—	—	—	—

=== Goaltending ===
- ‡ = Left team via a transaction (e.g., trade, waivers, release) during the season. Stats reflect time with the Canadiens only.

No.	Player	Regular season										Playoffs								
No.	Player	GP	W	L	T	SA	GA	GAA	SV%	SO	TOI	GP	W	L	SA	GA	GAA	SV%	SO	TOI
41	Jocelyn Thibault	61	22	24	11	1815	164	2.90	.910	1	3397	3	0	3	101	13	4.36	.871	0	179
60	Jose Theodore	16	5	6	2	508	53	3.87	.896	0	821	2	1	1	108	7	2.51	.935	0	168
39	Pat Jablonski‡	17	4	6	2	438	50	3.98	.886	0	754	—	—	—	—	—	—	—	—	—
37	Tomas Vokoun	1	0	0	0	14	4	12.00	.714	0	20	—	—	—	—	—	—	—	—	—

== Awards and records ==
=== Awards ===
Type	Award/honour	Recipient	Ref
League (in-season)	NHL All-Star Game selection	Mark Recchi	
Team	Jacques Beauchamp Molson Trophy	Stephane Quintal	
Team	Molson Cup	Mark Recchi	

=== Milestones ===
Milestone	Player	Date	Ref
First game	Terry Ryan	October 26, 1996	
First game	Eric Houde	December 29, 1996	
First game	Brad Brown	January 11, 1997	
First game	David Ling	January 11, 1997	
First game	Tomas Vokoun	February 6, 1997	

== Draft picks ==
Montreal's picks at the 1996 NHL entry draft held at the Kiel Center in St. Louis, Missouri.

Round	#	Player	Position	Nationality	College/Junior/Club team
1	18	Matt Higgins	Centre	Canada	Moose Jaw Warriors (WHL)
2	44	Mathieu Garon	Goalie	Canada	Victoriaville Tigres (QMJHL)
3	71	Arron Asham	Right wing	Canada	Red Deer Rebels (WHL)
4	92	Kim Staal	Left wing	Denmark	Malmö IF (Sweden)
4	99	Etienne Drapeau	Centre	Canada	Beauport Harfangs (QMJHL)
5	127	Daniel Archambault	Defence	Canada	Val-d'Or Foreurs (QMJHL)
6	154	Brett Clark	Defence	Canada	University of Maine (NCAA)
7	181	Timo Vertala	Left wing	Finland	JYP (Finland)
8	207	Mattia Baldi	Left wing	Switzerland	Ambri-Piotta (Swiss)
9	233	Michel Tremblay	Left wing	Canada	Shawinigan Cataractes (QMJHL)

== See also ==
- 1996–97 NHL season
