= 1996–97 New York Islanders season =

NHL hockey team season

1996–97 New York Islanders
- Division: 7th Atlantic
- Conference: 12th Eastern
- 1996–97 record: 29–41–12
- Home record: 19–18–4
- Road record: 10–23–8
- Goals for: 240
- Goals against: 250

Team information
- General manager: Mike Milbury
- Coach: Mike Milbury (Oct.–Jan.); Rick Bowness (Jan.–Apr.)
- Captain: Vacant
- Arena: Nassau Coliseum
- Average attendance: 12,494
- Minor league affiliate: Utah Grizzlies

Team leaders
- Goals: Zigmund Palffy (48)
- Assists: Zigmund Palffy (42)
- Points: Zigmund Palffy (90)
- Penalty minutes: Rich Pilon (179)
- Plus/minus: Zigmund Palffy (+21)
- Wins: Tommy Salo (20)
- Goals against average: Tommy Salo (2.82)

The 1996–97 New York Islanders season was the 25th season in the franchise's history. It saw the withdrawal of the "Fisherman" logo from 1995 at the start of the season and the return of the original logo. For the third consecutive year, the Islanders failed to make the playoffs.

== Offseason ==
Captain Patrick Flatley leaves Long Island, signing with the rival New York Rangers. The team does not name a new captain until the 1997–98 season.

== Regular season ==
=== Final standings ===
Atlantic Division
No.	CR		GP	W	L	T	GF	GA	Pts
1	1	**New Jersey Devils**	82	45	23	14	231	182	104
2	3	**Philadelphia Flyers**	82	45	24	13	274	217	103
3	4	**Florida Panthers**	82	35	28	19	221	201	89
4	5	**New York Rangers**	82	38	34	10	258	231	86
5	9	Washington Capitals	82	33	40	9	214	231	75
6	11	Tampa Bay Lightning	82	32	40	10	217	247	74
7	12	New York Islanders	82	29	41	12	240	250	70

Eastern Conference
R		Div	GP	W	L	T	GF	GA	Pts
**1**	**New Jersey Devils**	**ATL**	**82**	**45**	**23**	**14**	**231**	**182**	**104**
**2**	**Buffalo Sabres**	**NE**	**82**	**40**	**30**	**12**	**237**	**208**	**92**
**3**	**Philadelphia Flyers**	**ATL**	**82**	**45**	**24**	**13**	**274**	**217**	**103**
**4**	**Florida Panthers**	**ATL**	**82**	**35**	**28**	**19**	**221**	**201**	**89**
**5**	**New York Rangers**	**ATL**	**82**	**38**	**34**	**10**	**258**	**231**	**86**
**6**	**Pittsburgh Penguins**	**NE**	**82**	**38**	**36**	**8**	**285**	**280**	**84**
**7**	**Ottawa Senators**	**NE**	**82**	**31**	**36**	**15**	**226**	**234**	**77**
**8**	**Montreal Canadiens**	**NE**	**82**	**31**	**36**	**15**	**249**	**276**	**77**
9	Washington Capitals	ATL	82	33	40	9	214	231	75
10	Hartford Whalers	NE	82	32	39	11	226	256	75
11	Tampa Bay Lightning	ATL	82	32	40	10	217	247	74
12	New York Islanders	ATL	82	29	41	12	240	250	70
13	Boston Bruins	NE	82	26	47	9	234	300	61

Divisions: ATL – Atlantic, NE – Northeast

bold – Qualified for playoffs

== Schedule and results ==
1996–97 regular season
October: 1–5–4 (home: 1–3–1; road: 0–2–3)

Game	Date	Score	Opponent	Record	Recap
1	October 4, 1996	0–1	@ Los Angeles Kings (1996–97)	0–1–0	L
2	October 5, 1996	2–2 OT	@ San Jose Sharks (1996–97)	0–1–1	T
3	October 9, 1996	3–3 OT	@ Ottawa Senators (1996–97)	0–1–2	T
4	October 12, 1996	5–1	Philadelphia Flyers (1996–97)	1–1–2	W
5	October 17, 1996	1–3	Hartford Whalers (1996–97)	1–2–2	L
6	October 19, 1996	2–4	@ Detroit Red Wings (1996–97)	1–3–2	L
7	October 22, 1996	3–6	Tampa Bay Lightning (1996–97)	1–4–2	L
8	October 26, 1996	2–2 OT	San Jose Sharks (1996–97)	1–4–3	T
9	October 30, 1996	2–2 OT	@ Hartford Whalers (1996–97)	1–4–4	T
10	October 31, 1996	3–5	Toronto Maple Leafs (1996–97)	1–5–4	L

November: 5–5–4 (home: 3–3–1; road: 2–2–3)

Game	Date	Score	Opponent	Record	Recap
11	November 2, 1996	6–1	Washington Capitals (1996–97)	2–5–4	W
12	November 4, 1996	4–3	@ Philadelphia Flyers (1996–97)	3–5–4	W
13	November 6, 1996	1–1 OT	New York Rangers (1996–97)	3–5–5	T
14	November 9, 1996	0–4	@ New Jersey Devils (1996–97)	3–6–5	L
15	November 11, 1996	2–6	Colorado Avalanche (1996–97)	3–7–5	L
16	November 13, 1996	5–4 OT	Vancouver Canucks (1996–97)	4–7–5	W
17	November 15, 1996	3–3 OT	@ Florida Panthers (1996–97)	4–7–6	T
18	November 16, 1996	1–4	Ottawa Senators (1996–97)	4–8–6	L
19	November 20, 1996	2–2 OT	@ Mighty Ducks of Anaheim (1996–97)	4–8–7	T
20	November 22, 1996	2–3	@ Colorado Avalanche (1996–97)	4–9–7	L
21	November 23, 1996	3–3 OT	@ Phoenix Coyotes (1996–97)	4–9–8	T
22	November 27, 1996	4–1	Philadelphia Flyers (1996–97)	5–9–8	W
23	November 29, 1996	2–0	@ Washington Capitals (1996–97)	6–9–8	W
24	November 30, 1996	2–3	Buffalo Sabres (1996–97)	6–10–8	L

December: 6–7–0 (home: 5–3–0; road: 1–4–0)

Game	Date	Score	Opponent	Record	Recap
25	December 3, 1996	3–1	Calgary Flames (1996–97)	7–10–8	W
26	December 5, 1996	2–4	@ Florida Panthers (1996–97)	7–11–8	L
27	December 7, 1996	2–0	Washington Capitals (1996–97)	8–11–8	W
28	December 10, 1996	8–2	Phoenix Coyotes (1996–97)	9–11–8	W
29	December 11, 1996	5–3	@ New York Rangers (1996–97)	10–11–8	W
30	December 14, 1996	1–4	@ Tampa Bay Lightning (1996–97)	10–12–8	L
31	December 17, 1996	4–3	Los Angeles Kings (1996–97)	11–12–8	W
32	December 19, 1996	0–5	@ Philadelphia Flyers (1996–97)	11–13–8	L
33	December 21, 1996	2–3	Dallas Stars (1996–97)	11–14–8	L
34	December 23, 1996	3–4 OT	Florida Panthers (1996–97)	11–15–8	L
35	December 26, 1996	4–1	New Jersey Devils (1996–97)	12–15–8	W
36	December 28, 1996	1–7	Detroit Red Wings (1996–97)	12–16–8	L
37	December 30, 1996	0–2	@ Toronto Maple Leafs (1996–97)	12–17–8	L

January: 4–9–1 (home: 2–3–0; road: 2–6–1)

Game	Date	Score	Opponent	Record	Recap
38	January 2, 1997	3–4	@ New York Rangers (1996–97)	12–18–8	L
39	January 4, 1997	1–3	@ Montreal Canadiens (1996–97)	12–19–8	L
40	January 7, 1997	3–5	Pittsburgh Penguins (1996–97)	12–20–8	L
41	January 10, 1997	2–5	@ Pittsburgh Penguins (1996–97)	12–21–8	L
42	January 11, 1997	4–4 OT	@ Tampa Bay Lightning (1996–97)	12–21–9	T
43	January 13, 1997	4–2	@ New York Rangers (1996–97)	13–21–9	W
44	January 15, 1997	1–2	Buffalo Sabres (1996–97)	13–22–9	L
45	January 20, 1997	4–6	St. Louis Blues (1996–97)	13–23–9	L
46	January 22, 1997	8–1	Edmonton Oilers (1996–97)	14–23–9	W
47	January 24, 1997	5–2	@ Hartford Whalers (1996–97)	15–23–9	W
48	January 25, 1997	3–2	Chicago Blackhawks (1996–97)	16–23–9	W
49	January 28, 1997	3–4	@ Calgary Flames (1996–97)	16–24–9	L
50	January 30, 1997	1–2 OT	@ Vancouver Canucks (1996–97)	16–25–9	L
51	January 31, 1997	0–1	@ Edmonton Oilers (1996–97)	16–26–9	L

February: 4–6–1 (home: 3–3–1; road: 1–3–0)

Game	Date	Score	Opponent	Record	Recap
52	February 4, 1997	4–3	Mighty Ducks of Anaheim (1996–97)	17–26–9	W
53	February 5, 1997	1–4	@ New Jersey Devils (1996–97)	17–27–9	L
54	February 8, 1997	2–5	New York Rangers (1996–97)	17–28–9	L
55	February 11, 1997	5–5 OT	Ottawa Senators (1996–97)	17–28–10	T
56	February 12, 1997	5–1	@ Pittsburgh Penguins (1996–97)	18–28–10	W
57	February 15, 1997	1–0 OT	Florida Panthers (1996–97)	19–28–10	W
58	February 17, 1997	1–4	Montreal Canadiens (1996–97)	19–29–10	L
59	February 21, 1997	2–5	@ Buffalo Sabres (1996–97)	19–30–10	L
60	February 23, 1997	4–1	Pittsburgh Penguins (1996–97)	20–30–10	W
61	February 26, 1997	3–5	New Jersey Devils (1996–97)	20–31–10	L
62	February 28, 1997	1–4	@ Ottawa Senators (1996–97)	20–32–10	L

March: 8–4–1 (home: 4–1–1; road: 4–3–0)

Game	Date	Score	Opponent	Record	Recap
63	March 2, 1997	2–0	@ Washington Capitals (1996–97)	21–32–10	W
64	March 4, 1997	3–6	Tampa Bay Lightning (1996–97)	21–33–10	L
65	March 6, 1997	5–2	Boston Bruins (1996–97)	22–33–10	W
66	March 8, 1997	5–1	New Jersey Devils (1996–97)	23–33–10	W
67	March 11, 1997	2–3	@ Florida Panthers (1996–97)	23–34–10	L
68	March 13, 1997	3–0	@ Tampa Bay Lightning (1996–97)	24–34–10	W
69	March 15, 1997	2–5	@ Boston Bruins (1996–97)	24–35–10	L
70	March 16, 1997	4–5	@ Chicago Blackhawks (1996–97)	24–36–10	L
71	March 19, 1997	7–4	Florida Panthers (1996–97)	25–36–10	W
72	March 22, 1997	3–3 OT	Philadelphia Flyers (1996–97)	25–36–11	T
73	March 26, 1997	3–2 OT	@ Buffalo Sabres (1996–97)	26–36–11	W
74	March 27, 1997	6–3	@ Boston Bruins (1996–97)	27–36–11	W
75	March 29, 1997	8–2	Boston Bruins (1996–97)	28–36–11	W

April: 1–5–1 (home: 1–2–0; road: 0–3–1)

Game	Date	Score	Opponent	Record	Recap
76	April 2, 1997	4–5	@ Dallas Stars (1996–97)	28–37–11	L
77	April 3, 1997	5–5 OT	@ St. Louis Blues (1996–97)	28–37–12	T
78	April 5, 1997	2–3	Tampa Bay Lightning (1996–97)	28–38–12	L
79	April 7, 1997	1–2	@ Montreal Canadiens (1996–97)	28–39–12	L
80	April 9, 1997	1–3	Montreal Canadiens (1996–97)	28–40–12	L
81	April 11, 1997	6–4	Hartford Whalers (1996–97)	29–40–12	W
82	April 12, 1997	2–6	@ Washington Capitals (1996–97)	29–41–12	L

Legend: W Win (2 points) L Loss (0 points) T Tie (1 point)

== Player statistics ==
=== Scoring ===
- Position abbreviations: C = Center; D = Defense; G = Goaltender; LW = Left wing; RW = Right wing
- † = Joined team via a transaction (e.g., trade, waivers, signing) during the season. Stats reflect time with the Islanders only.
- ‡ = Left team via a transaction (e.g., trade, waivers, release) during the season. Stats reflect time with the Islanders only.

No.	Player	Pos	Regular season					
No.	Player	Pos	GP	G	A	Pts	+/-	PIM
16	Zigmund Palffy	RW	80	48	42	90	21	43
39	Travis Green	C	79	23	41	64	−5	38
15	Bryan Smolinski†	C	64	28	28	56	9	25
27	Derek King‡	LW	70	23	30	53	−6	20
34	Bryan Berard	D	82	8	40	48	1	86
32	Niklas Andersson	LW	74	12	31	43	4	57
18	Marty McInnis‡	RW	70	20	22	42	−7	20
4	Bryan McCabe	D	82	8	20	28	−2	165
44	Todd Bertuzzi	RW	64	10	13	23	−3	68
3	Kenny Jonsson	D	81	3	18	21	10	24
21	Robert Reichel†	C	12	5	14	19	7	4
13 (Note: Lapointe wore number 48 on October 31.)	Claude Lapointe	C	73	13	5	18	−12	49
7	Scott Lachance	D	81	3	11	14	−7	47
14	Derek Armstrong	C	50	6	7	13	−8	33
42 (Note: Plante wore number 21 through December 5.)	Dan Plante	RW	67	4	9	13	−6	75
11 (Note: Wood wore number 10 through November 16.)	Randy Wood	LW	65	6	5	11	−7	61
20	Brent Hughes	LW	51	7	3	10	−4	57
6	Doug Houda†	D	70	2	8	10	1	99
24	Paul Kruse†	LW	48	4	2	6	−5	111
2 (Note: Pilon wore number 47 in his first two games.)	Rich Pilon	D	52	1	4	5	4	179
62	Steve Webb†	RW	41	1	4	5	−10	144
11	Darius Kasparaitis‡	D	18	0	5	5	−7	16
38	Andreas Johansson‡	C	15	2	2	4	−6	0
28 (Note: Vaske wore number 37 in his first five games.)	Dennis Vaske	D	17	0	4	4	3	12
10	Dave McLlwain	C	4	1	1	2	−2	0
33	Ken Belanger	LW	18	0	2	2	−1	102
46	Jason Holland	D	4	1	0	1	1	0
12	Mick Vukota	RW	17	1	0	1	−2	71
35	Tommy Salo	G	58	0	1	1		4
24	Dave Archibald†	C	7	0	0	0	−4	4
36	Jarrett Deuling	LW	1	0	0	0	0	0
8	Mike Donnelly	LW	3	0	0	0	0	2
28	Jim Dowd	C	3	0	0	0	−1	0
1	Eric Fichaud	G	34	0	0	0		2
10 (Note: Foster wore number 6 in his first five games.)	Corey Foster	D	7	0	0	0	−2	2
30	Tommy Soderstrom	G	1	0	0	0		0
25	Chris Taylor	C	1	0	0	0	0	0
21	Nick Vachon†	C	1	0	0	0	−1	0
42	Andrei Vasilyev	LW	3	0	0	0	−3	2

=== Goaltending ===
No.	Player	Regular season									
No.	Player	GP	W	L	T	SA	GA	GAA	SV%	SO	TOI
35	Tommy Salo	58	20	27	8	1576	151	2.82	.904	5	3208
1	Eric Fichaud	34	9	14	4	897	91	3.10	.899	0	1759
30	Tommy Soderstrom	1	0	0	0	0	0	0.00		0	1

== Awards and records ==
=== Awards ===
Type	Award/honor	Recipient	Ref
League (annual)	Calder Memorial Trophy	Bryan Berard	
League (annual)	NHL All-Rookie Team	Bryan Berard (Defense)	
League (in-season)	NHL All-Star Game selection	Scott Lachance	
League (in-season)	NHL All-Star Game selection	Zigmund Palffy (Note: Palffy did not play and was replaced by Lachance.)	
Team	Bob Nystrom Award	Claude Lapointe	

=== Milestones ===
Milestone	Player	Date	Ref
First game	Bryan Berard	October 4, 1996	
First game	Nicholas Vachon	December 17, 1996	
First game	Jason Holland	December 30, 1996	
First game	Steve Webb	January 7, 1997	

== Draft picks ==
New York's draft picks at the 1996 NHL entry draft held at the Kiel Center in St. Louis, Missouri.

Round	#	Player	Nationality	College/Junior/Club team (League)
1	3	Jean-Pierre Dumont	Canada	Val-d'Or Foreurs (QMJHL)
2	29	Dan LaCouture	United States	Enfield Jr. Whalers (EJHL)
3	56	Zdeno Chara	Slovakia	Dukla Trenčín (Slovakia)
4	83	Tyrone Garner	Canada	Oshawa Generals (OHL)
5	109	Andrew Berenzweig	United States	University of Michigan (CCHA)
5	128	Petr Sachl	Czech Republic	HC České Budějovice (Czech Republic)
6	138	Todd Miller	Canada	Sarnia Sting (OHL)
7	165	J. R. Prestifilippo	United States	Hotchkiss School (USHS-CT)
8	192	Evgeny Korolev	Russia	Peterborough Petes (OHL)
9	218	Mike Muzechka	Canada	Calgary Hitmen (WHL)
