= 1996–97 Dallas Stars season =

National Hockey League team season

1996–97 Dallas Stars
- Central Division champions
- Division: 1st Central
- Conference: 2nd Western
- 1996–97 record: 48–26–8
- Home record: 25–13–3
- Road record: 23–13–5
- Goals for: 252
- Goals against: 198

Team information
- General manager: Bob Gainey
- Coach: Ken Hitchcock
- Captain: Derian Hatcher
- Arena: Reunion Arena
- Average attendance: 15,997
- Minor league affiliates: Michigan K-Wings; Dayton Bombers

Team leaders
- Goals: Mike Modano (35)
- Assists: Mike Modano (48)
- Points: Mike Modano (83)
- Penalty minutes: Todd Harvey (142)
- Plus/minus: Mike Modano (+43)
- Wins: Andy Moog (28)
- Goals against average: Andy Moog (2.15)

The 1996–97 Dallas Stars season was the fourth National Hockey League season in Dallas, Texas (and 30th as a franchise) as they attempted to bounce back from their dismal last place finish in the Central Division, which they would, finishing first, clinching the first Division title for Dallas. They would face off against the Edmonton Oilers in the Conference Quarterfinals, playing a tough series, losing 4-3.

== Regular season ==
=== Final standings ===
Central Division
| No. | CR | | GP | W | L | T | GF | GA | Pts |
|---|---|---|---|---|---|---|---|---|---|
| 1 | 2 | **Dallas Stars** | 82 | 48 | 26 | 8 | 252 | 198 | 104 |
| 2 | 3 | **Detroit Red Wings** | 82 | 38 | 26 | 18 | 253 | 197 | 94 |
| 3 | 5 | **Phoenix Coyotes** | 82 | 38 | 37 | 7 | 240 | 243 | 83 |
| 4 | 6 | **St. Louis Blues** | 82 | 36 | 35 | 11 | 236 | 239 | 83 |
| 5 | 8 | **Chicago Blackhawks** | 82 | 34 | 35 | 13 | 223 | 210 | 81 |
| 6 | 11 | Toronto Maple Leafs | 82 | 30 | 44 | 8 | 230 | 273 | 68 |

Note: CR = Conference rank; GP = Games played; W = Wins; L = Losses; T = Ties; GF = Goals for; GA = Goals against; Pts = Points
Bolded teams qualified for the playoffs.

Western Conference
| R | | Div | GP | W | L | T | GF | GA | Pts |
|---|---|---|---|---|---|---|---|---|---|
| **1** | **p – Colorado Avalanche** | **PAC** | **82** | **49** | **24** | **9** | **277** | **205** | **107** |
| **2** | **Dallas Stars** | **CEN** | **82** | **48** | **26** | **8** | **252** | **198** | **104** |
| **3** | **Detroit Red Wings** | **CEN** | **82** | **38** | **26** | **18** | **253** | **197** | **94** |
| **4** | **Mighty Ducks of Anaheim** | **PAC** | **82** | **36** | **33** | **13** | **245** | **233** | **85** |
| **5** | **Phoenix Coyotes** | **CEN** | **82** | **38** | **37** | **7** | **240** | **243** | **83** |
| **6** | **St. Louis Blues** | **CEN** | **82** | **36** | **35** | **11** | **236** | **239** | **83** |
| **7** | **Edmonton Oilers** | **PAC** | **82** | **36** | **37** | **9** | **252** | **247** | **81** |
| **8** | **Chicago Blackhawks** | **CEN** | **82** | **34** | **35** | **13** | **223** | **210** | **81** |
| 9 | Vancouver Canucks | PAC | 82 | 35 | 40 | 7 | 257 | 273 | 77 |
| 10 | Calgary Flames | PAC | 82 | 32 | 41 | 9 | 214 | 239 | 73 |
| 11 | Toronto Maple Leafs | CEN | 82 | 30 | 44 | 8 | 230 | 273 | 68 |
| 12 | Los Angeles Kings | PAC | 82 | 28 | 43 | 11 | 214 | 268 | 67 |
| 13 | San Jose Sharks | PAC | 82 | 27 | 47 | 8 | 211 | 278 | 62 |

Divisions: CEN – Central, PAC – Pacific

bold – Qualified for playoffs; p – Won Presidents' Trophy

== Schedule and results ==
=== Regular season ===
1996–97 regular season
October: 9–2–0 (home: 6–1–0; road: 3–1–0)

| Game | Date | Score | Opponent | Record | Recap |
|---|---|---|---|---|---|
| 1 | October 5, 1996 | 4–1 | Colorado Avalanche (1996–97) | 1–0–0 | W |
| 2 | October 8, 1996 | 5–3 | Washington Capitals (1996–97) | 2–0–0 | W |
| 3 | October 10, 1996 | 2–1 | @ New York Rangers (1996–97) | 3–0–0 | W |
| 4 | October 12, 1996 | 4–2 | @ New Jersey Devils (1996–97) | 4–0–0 | W |
| 5 | October 13, 1996 | 5–3 | @ Chicago Blackhawks (1996–97) | 5–0–0 | W |
| 6 | October 15, 1996 | 3–1 | Detroit Red Wings (1996–97) | 6–0–0 | W |
| 7 | October 17, 1996 | 1–6 | Vancouver Canucks (1996–97) | 6–1–0 | L |
| 8 | October 19, 1996 | 2–0 | Toronto Maple Leafs (1996–97) | 7–1–0 | W |
| 9 | October 23, 1996 | 1–4 | @ Detroit Red Wings (1996–97) | 7–2–0 | L |
| 10 | October 26, 1996 | 5–1 | Ottawa Senators (1996–97) | 8–2–0 | W |
| 11 | October 30, 1996 | 2–0 | Buffalo Sabres (1996–97) | 9–2–0 | W |

November: 7–6–1 (home: 2–3–1; road: 5–3–0)

| Game | Date | Score | Opponent | Record | Recap |
|---|---|---|---|---|---|
| 12 | November 1, 1996 | 2–3 OT | Chicago Blackhawks (1996–97) | 9–3–0 | L |
| 13 | November 3, 1996 | 3–6 | @ St. Louis Blues (1996–97) | 9–4–0 | L |
| 14 | November 6, 1996 | 3–2 | @ Phoenix Coyotes (1996–97) | 10–4–0 | W |
| 15 | November 8, 1996 | 1–3 | @ San Jose Sharks (1996–97) | 10–5–0 | L |
| 16 | November 11, 1996 | 3–2 | @ Mighty Ducks of Anaheim (1996–97) | 11–5–0 | W |
| 17 | November 13, 1996 | 3–3 OT | Calgary Flames (1996–97) | 11–5–1 | T |
| 18 | November 15, 1996 | 4–3 | Mighty Ducks of Anaheim (1996–97) | 12–5–1 | W |
| 19 | November 17, 1996 | 7–3 | @ Edmonton Oilers (1996–97) | 13–5–1 | W |
| 20 | November 19, 1996 | 0–2 | @ Vancouver Canucks (1996–97) | 13–6–1 | L |
| 21 | November 20, 1996 | 3–1 | @ Calgary Flames (1996–97) | 14–6–1 | W |
| 22 | November 22, 1996 | 1–2 OT | Florida Panthers (1996–97) | 14–7–1 | L |
| 23 | November 27, 1996 | 2–3 | New Jersey Devils (1996–97) | 14–8–1 | L |
| 24 | November 29, 1996 | 2–1 | @ Tampa Bay Lightning (1996–97) | 15–8–1 | W |
| 25 | November 30, 1996 | 5–2 | Toronto Maple Leafs (1996–97) | 16–8–1 | W |

December: 6–5–2 (home: 2–4–1; road: 4–1–1)

| Game | Date | Score | Opponent | Record | Recap |
|---|---|---|---|---|---|
| 26 | December 4, 1996 | 1–2 | San Jose Sharks (1996–97) | 16–9–1 | L |
| 27 | December 6, 1996 | 3–6 | Philadelphia Flyers (1996–97) | 16–10–1 | L |
| 28 | December 8, 1996 | 1–1 OT | @ Florida Panthers (1996–97) | 16–10–2 | T |
| 29 | December 11, 1996 | 5–5 OT | St. Louis Blues (1996–97) | 16–10–3 | T |
| 30 | December 13, 1996 | 2–1 | Vancouver Canucks (1996–97) | 17–10–3 | W |
| 31 | December 15, 1996 | 4–0 | @ Ottawa Senators (1996–97) | 18–10–3 | W |
| 32 | December 18, 1996 | 3–2 OT | @ Chicago Blackhawks (1996–97) | 19–10–3 | W |
| 33 | December 20, 1996 | 4–1 | @ Hartford Whalers (1996–97) | 20–10–3 | W |
| 34 | December 21, 1996 | 3–2 | @ New York Islanders (1996–97) | 21–10–3 | W |
| 35 | December 23, 1996 | 1–2 | San Jose Sharks (1996–97) | 21–11–3 | L |
| 36 | December 27, 1996 | 6–4 | Boston Bruins (1996–97) | 22–11–3 | W |
| 37 | December 29, 1996 | 2–3 | @ Colorado Avalanche (1996–97) | 22–12–3 | L |
| 38 | December 30, 1996 | 2–3 | New York Rangers (1996–97) | 22–13–3 | L |

January: 7–5–1 (home: 3–2–0; road: 4–3–1)

| Game | Date | Score | Opponent | Record | Recap |
|---|---|---|---|---|---|
| 39 | January 1, 1997 | 4–6 | Montreal Canadiens (1996–97) | 22–14–3 | L |
| 40 | January 3, 1997 | 2–1 | @ Detroit Red Wings (1996–97) | 23–14–3 | W |
| 41 | January 4, 1997 | 2–3 | @ Boston Bruins (1996–97) | 23–15–3 | L |
| 42 | January 8, 1997 | 6–3 | Detroit Red Wings (1996–97) | 24–15–3 | W |
| 43 | January 10, 1997 | 3–4 | Phoenix Coyotes (1996–97) | 24–16–3 | L |
| 44 | January 13, 1997 | 2–1 | @ Montreal Canadiens (1996–97) | 25–16–3 | W |
| 45 | January 14, 1997 | 1–3 | @ Pittsburgh Penguins (1996–97) | 25–17–3 | L |
| 46 | January 21, 1997 | 3–3 OT | @ Philadelphia Flyers (1996–97) | 25–17–4 | T |
| 47 | January 24, 1997 | 5–2 | @ Washington Capitals (1996–97) | 26–17–4 | W |
| 48 | January 25, 1997 | 5–1 | @ Toronto Maple Leafs (1996–97) | 27–17–4 | W |
| 49 | January 27, 1997 | 7–2 | Los Angeles Kings (1996–97) | 28–17–4 | W |
| 50 | January 29, 1997 | 3–1 | Mighty Ducks of Anaheim (1996–97) | 29–17–4 | W |
| 51 | January 31, 1997 | 1–3 | @ Buffalo Sabres (1996–97) | 29–18–4 | L |

February: 9–4–0 (home: 5–1–0; road: 4–3–0)

| Game | Date | Score | Opponent | Record | Recap |
|---|---|---|---|---|---|
| 52 | February 2, 1997 | 3–4 OT | @ Detroit Red Wings (1996–97) | 29–19–4 | L |
| 53 | February 5, 1997 | 4–0 | Tampa Bay Lightning (1996–97) | 30–19–4 | W |
| 54 | February 6, 1997 | 4–6 | @ St. Louis Blues (1996–97) | 30–20–4 | L |
| 55 | February 8, 1997 | 5–4 OT | @ Phoenix Coyotes (1996–97) | 31–20–4 | W |
| 56 | February 9, 1997 | 2–1 OT | Los Angeles Kings (1996–97) | 32–20–4 | W |
| 57 | February 12, 1997 | 0–5 | Phoenix Coyotes (1996–97) | 32–21–4 | L |
| 58 | February 14, 1997 | 4–3 OT | Detroit Red Wings (1996–97) | 33–21–4 | W |
| 59 | February 17, 1997 | 2–1 | @ Los Angeles Kings (1996–97) | 34–21–4 | W |
| 60 | February 18, 1997 | 1–3 | @ San Jose Sharks (1996–97) | 34–22–4 | L |
| 61 | February 21, 1997 | 4–2 | Calgary Flames (1996–97) | 35–22–4 | W |
| 62 | February 23, 1997 | 6–1 | Edmonton Oilers (1996–97) | 36–22–4 | W |
| 63 | February 25, 1997 | 1–0 | @ Chicago Blackhawks (1996–97) | 37–22–4 | W |
| 64 | February 27, 1997 | 6–2 | @ Colorado Avalanche (1996–97) | 38–22–4 | W |

March: 8–1–2 (home: 5–0–1; road: 3–1–1)

| Game | Date | Score | Opponent | Record | Recap |
|---|---|---|---|---|---|
| 65 | March 1, 1997 | 1–4 | @ Calgary Flames (1996–97) | 38–23–4 | L |
| 66 | March 5, 1997 | 3–2 | St. Louis Blues (1996–97) | 39–23–4 | W |
| 67 | March 7, 1997 | 2–1 | Edmonton Oilers (1996–97) | 40–23–4 | W |
| 68 | March 10, 1997 | 3–3 OT | @ Toronto Maple Leafs (1996–97) | 40–23–5 | T |
| 69 | March 14, 1997 | 4–4 OT | Chicago Blackhawks (1996–97) | 40–23–6 | T |
| 70 | March 16, 1997 | 6–2 | Pittsburgh Penguins (1996–97) | 41–23–6 | W |
| 71 | March 19, 1997 | 7–2 | Phoenix Coyotes (1996–97) | 42–23–6 | W |
| 72 | March 21, 1997 | 2–0 | Hartford Whalers (1996–97) | 43–23–6 | W |
| 73 | March 23, 1997 | 4–1 | @ St. Louis Blues (1996–97) | 44–23–6 | W |
| 74 | March 30, 1997 | 3–2 | @ Vancouver Canucks (1996–97) | 45–23–6 | W |
| 75 | March 31, 1997 | 3–1 | @ Edmonton Oilers (1996–97) | 46–23–6 | W |

April: 2–3–2 (home: 2–2–0; road: 0–1–2)

| Game | Date | Score | Opponent | Record | Recap |
|---|---|---|---|---|---|
| 76 | April 2, 1997 | 5–4 | New York Islanders (1996–97) | 47–23–6 | W |
| 77 | April 4, 1997 | 2–3 | @ Mighty Ducks of Anaheim (1996–97) | 47–24–6 | L |
| 78 | April 5, 1997 | 3–3 OT | @ Los Angeles Kings (1996–97) | 47–24–7 | T |
| 79 | April 7, 1997 | 2–2 OT | @ Phoenix Coyotes (1996–97) | 47–24–8 | T |
| 80 | April 9, 1997 | 3–2 | Toronto Maple Leafs (1996–97) | 48–24–8 | W |
| 81 | April 11, 1997 | 1–2 | Colorado Avalanche (1996–97) | 48–25–8 | L |
| 82 | April 13, 1997 | 2–5 | Chicago Blackhawks (1996–97) | 48–26–8 | L |

Legend: W Win (2 points) L Loss (0 points) T Tie (1 point)

=== Playoffs ===
1997 Stanley Cup playoffs
Western Conference Quarterfinals vs. (7) Edmonton Oilers – Oilers win 4–3

| Game | Date | Score | Opponent | Series | Recap |
|---|---|---|---|---|---|
| 1 | April 16, 1997 | 5–3 | Edmonton Oilers | Stars lead 1–0 | W |
| 2 | April 18, 1997 | 0–4 | Edmonton Oilers | Series tied 1–1 | L |
| 3 | April 20, 1997 | 3–4 OT | @ Edmonton Oilers | Oilers lead 2–1 | L |
| 4 | April 22, 1997 | 4–3 | @ Edmonton Oilers | Series tied 2–2 | W |
| 5 | April 25, 1997 | 0–1 2OT | Edmonton Oilers | Oilers lead 3–2 | L |
| 6 | April 27, 1997 | 3–2 | @ Edmonton Oilers | Series tied 3–3 | W |
| 7 | April 29, 1997 | 3–4 OT | Edmonton Oilers | Oilers win 4–3 | L |

Legend: W Win L Loss

== Player statistics ==
=== Scoring ===
- Position abbreviations: C = Center; D = Defense; G = Goaltender; LW = Left wing; RW = Right wing
- † = Joined team via a transaction (e.g., trade, waivers, signing) during the season. Stats reflect time with the Stars only.
- ‡ = Left team via a transaction (e.g., trade, waivers, release) during the season. Stats reflect time with the Stars only.

| No. | Player | Pos | Regular season | | | | | | Playoffs | | | | | |
| No. | Player | Pos | GP | G | A | Pts | +/- | PIM | GP | G | A | Pts | +/- | PIM |
|---|---|---|---|---|---|---|---|---|---|---|---|---|---|---|
| 9 | Mike Modano | C | 80 | 35 | 48 | 83 | 43 | 42 | 7 | 4 | 1 | 5 | 2 | 0 |
| 16 | Pat Verbeek | RW | 81 | 17 | 36 | 53 | 3 | 128 | 7 | 1 | 3 | 4 | −2 | 16 |
| 25 | Joe Nieuwendyk | C | 66 | 30 | 21 | 51 | −5 | 32 | 7 | 2 | 2 | 4 | −1 | 6 |
| 5 | Darryl Sydor | D | 82 | 8 | 40 | 48 | 37 | 51 | 7 | 0 | 2 | 2 | −2 | 0 |
| 33 | Benoit Hogue | C | 73 | 19 | 24 | 43 | 8 | 54 | 7 | 2 | 2 | 4 | −1 | 6 |
| 26 | Jere Lehtinen | RW | 63 | 16 | 27 | 43 | 26 | 2 | 7 | 2 | 2 | 4 | 1 | 0 |
| 56 | Sergei Zubov | D | 78 | 13 | 30 | 43 | 19 | 24 | 7 | 0 | 3 | 3 | 4 | 2 |
| 14 | Dave Reid | LW | 82 | 19 | 20 | 39 | 12 | 10 | 7 | 1 | 0 | 1 | −2 | 4 |
| 15 | Jamie Langenbrunner | RW | 76 | 13 | 26 | 39 | −2 | 51 | 5 | 1 | 1 | 2 | 1 | 14 |
| 23 | Greg Adams | LW | 50 | 21 | 15 | 36 | 27 | 2 | 3 | 0 | 1 | 1 | 2 | 0 |
| 10 | Todd Harvey | RW | 71 | 9 | 22 | 31 | 19 | 142 | 7 | 0 | 1 | 1 | −2 | 10 |
| 41 | Brent Gilchrist | LW | 67 | 10 | 20 | 30 | 6 | 24 | 6 | 2 | 2 | 4 | 0 | 2 |
| 2 | Derian Hatcher | D | 63 | 3 | 19 | 22 | 8 | 97 | 7 | 0 | 2 | 2 | 1 | 20 |
| 21 | Guy Carbonneau | C | 73 | 5 | 16 | 21 | 9 | 36 | 7 | 0 | 1 | 1 | −3 | 6 |
| 12 | Grant Ledyard | D | 67 | 1 | 15 | 16 | 31 | 61 | 7 | 0 | 2 | 2 | −3 | 0 |
| 7 | Neal Broten† | C | 20 | 8 | 7 | 15 | 6 | 12 | 2 | 0 | 1 | 1 | 0 | 0 |
| 3 | Craig Ludwig | D | 77 | 2 | 11 | 13 | 17 | 62 | 7 | 0 | 2 | 2 | 1 | 18 |
| 28 | Bob Bassen | C | 46 | 5 | 7 | 12 | 5 | 41 | 7 | 3 | 1 | 4 | 3 | 4 |
| 24 | Richard Matvichuk | D | 57 | 5 | 7 | 12 | 1 | 87 | 7 | 0 | 1 | 1 | −1 | 20 |
| 17 | Bill Huard | LW | 40 | 5 | 6 | 11 | 5 | 105 | — | — | — | — | — | — |
| 29 | Grant Marshall | RW | 56 | 6 | 4 | 10 | 5 | 98 | 5 | 0 | 2 | 2 | 2 | 8 |
| 39 | Mike Kennedy | C | 24 | 1 | 6 | 7 | 3 | 13 | — | — | — | — | — | — |
| 18 | Mike Lalor | D | 55 | 1 | 1 | 2 | 3 | 42 | — | — | — | — | — | — |
| 32 | Arturs Irbe | G | 35 | 0 | 2 | 2 | | 8 | 1 | 0 | 0 | 0 | | 0 |
| 22 | Dan Keczmer | D | 13 | 0 | 1 | 1 | 3 | 6 | — | — | — | — | — | — |
| 35 | Andy Moog | G | 48 | 0 | 1 | 1 | | 12 | 7 | 0 | 1 | 1 | | 0 |
| 44 | Patrick Cote | LW | 3 | 0 | 0 | 0 | 0 | 27 | — | — | — | — | — | — |
| 27 | Marc Labelle | LW | 9 | 0 | 0 | 0 | −4 | 46 | — | — | — | — | — | — |
| 42 | Sergei Makarov†‡ | RW | 4 | 0 | 0 | 0 | −2 | 0 | — | — | — | — | — | — |
| 1 | Roman Turek | G | 6 | 0 | 0 | 0 | | 0 | — | — | — | — | — | — |

=== Goaltending ===
| No. | Player | Regular season | | | | | | | | | | Playoffs | | | | | | | | |
| No. | Player | GP | W | L | T | SA | GA | GAA | SV% | SO | TOI | GP | W | L | SA | GA | GAA | SV% | SO | TOI |
|---|---|---|---|---|---|---|---|---|---|---|---|---|---|---|---|---|---|---|---|---|
| 35 | Andy Moog | 48 | 28 | 13 | 5 | 1121 | 98 | 2.15 | .913 | 3 | 2738 | 7 | 3 | 4 | 214 | 21 | 2.81 | .902 | 0 | 449 |
| 32 | Arturs Irbe | 35 | 17 | 12 | 3 | 825 | 88 | 2.69 | .893 | 3 | 1965 | 1 | 0 | 0 | 4 | 0 | 0.00 | 1.000 | 0 | 13 |
| 1 | Roman Turek | 6 | 3 | 1 | 0 | 129 | 9 | 2.06 | .930 | 0 | 263 | — | — | — | — | — | — | — | — | — |

== Awards and records ==
=== Awards ===
| Type | Award/honor | Recipient | Ref |
|---|---|---|---|
| League (in-season) | NHL All-Star Game selection | Derian Hatcher | |
| League (in-season) | NHL All-Star Game selection | Ken Hitchcock (coach) | |
| League (in-season) | NHL All-Star Game selection | Mike Modano (Note: Modano did not play and was replaced by Keith Tkachuk of the Phoenix Coyotes.) | |
| League (in-season) | NHL All-Star Game selection | Andy Moog | |
| Team | Star of the Game Award | Mike Modano | |

=== Milestones ===
| Milestone | Player | Date | Ref |
|---|---|---|---|
| First game | Marc LaBelle | October 23, 1996 | |
| First game | Roman Turek | November 20, 1996 | |
| 1,000th game played | Pat Verbeek | November 11, 1996 | |
| 25th shutout | Andy Moog | December 15, 1996 | |

== Draft picks ==
Dallas's draft picks at the 1996 NHL entry draft held at the Kiel Center in St. Louis, Missouri.

| Round | # | Player | Nationality | College/Junior/Club team (League) |
|---|---|---|---|---|
| 1 | 5 | Ric Jackman | Canada | Sault Ste. Marie Greyhounds (OHL) |
| 3 | 70 | Jon Sim | Canada | Sarnia Sting (OHL) |
| 4 | 90 | Mike Hurley | Canada | Tri-City Americans (WHL) |
| 5 | 112 | Ryan Christie | Canada | Owen Sound Platers (OHL) |
| 5 | 113 | Yevgeni Tsybuk | Russia | Yaroslavl Torpedo (Russia) |
| 7 | 166 | Eoin McInerney | Canada | London Knights (OHL) |
| 8 | 194 | Joel Kwiatkowski | Canada | Prince George Cougars (WHL) |
| 9 | 220 | Nick Bootland | Canada | Guelph Storm (OHL) |

== See also ==
- 1996–97 NHL season
