= 1996–97 Tampa Bay Lightning season =

National Hockey League team season

1996–97 Tampa Bay Lightning
- Division: 6th Atlantic
- Conference: 11th Eastern
- 1996–97 record: 32–40–10
- Home record: 15–18–8
- Road record: 17–22–2
- Goals for: 217
- Goals against: 247

Team information
- General manager: Phil Esposito
- Coach: Terry Crisp
- Captain: Paul Ysebaert
- Arena: Ice Palace
- Average attendance: 17,442
- Minor league affiliate: Adirondack Red Wings

Team leaders
- Goals: Dino Ciccarelli (35)
- Assists: John Cullen (37)
- Points: Chris Gratton (62)
- Penalty minutes: Chris Gratton (201)
- Plus/minus: Bill Houlder (+16)
- Wins: Rick Tabaracci (20)
- Goals against average: Rick Tabaracci (2.75)

The 1996–97 Tampa Bay Lightning season was the Lightning's fifth season of operation. The Lightning were unable to qualify for the playoffs for the first time since the 1994–95 season despite making their first playoff appearance the previous year and losing to the Philadelphia Flyers in the first round.

== Regular season ==
=== Final standings ===
Atlantic Division
No.	CR		GP	W	L	T	GF	GA	Pts
1	1	**New Jersey Devils**	82	45	23	14	231	182	104
2	3	**Philadelphia Flyers**	82	45	24	13	274	217	103
3	4	**Florida Panthers**	82	35	28	19	221	201	89
4	5	**New York Rangers**	82	38	34	10	258	231	86
5	9	Washington Capitals	82	33	40	9	214	231	75
6	11	Tampa Bay Lightning	82	32	40	10	217	247	74
7	12	New York Islanders	82	29	41	12	240	250	70

Eastern Conference
R		Div	GP	W	L	T	GF	GA	Pts
**1**	**New Jersey Devils**	**ATL**	**82**	**45**	**23**	**14**	**231**	**182**	**104**
**2**	**Buffalo Sabres**	**NE**	**82**	**40**	**30**	**12**	**237**	**208**	**92**
**3**	**Philadelphia Flyers**	**ATL**	**82**	**45**	**24**	**13**	**274**	**217**	**103**
**4**	**Florida Panthers**	**ATL**	**82**	**35**	**28**	**19**	**221**	**201**	**89**
**5**	**New York Rangers**	**ATL**	**82**	**38**	**34**	**10**	**258**	**231**	**86**
**6**	**Pittsburgh Penguins**	**NE**	**82**	**38**	**36**	**8**	**285**	**280**	**84**
**7**	**Ottawa Senators**	**NE**	**82**	**31**	**36**	**15**	**226**	**234**	**77**
**8**	**Montreal Canadiens**	**NE**	**82**	**31**	**36**	**15**	**249**	**276**	**77**
9	Washington Capitals	ATL	82	33	40	9	214	231	75
10	Hartford Whalers	NE	82	32	39	11	226	256	75
11	Tampa Bay Lightning	ATL	82	32	40	10	217	247	74
12	New York Islanders	ATL	82	29	41	12	240	250	70
13	Boston Bruins	NE	82	26	47	9	234	300	61

Divisions: ATL – Atlantic, NE – Northeast

bold – Qualified for playoffs

== Schedule and results ==
1996–97 regular season
October: 5–4–1 (home: 1–3–1; road: 4–1–0)

Game	Date	Score	Opponent	Record	Recap
1	October 5, 1996	4–3 OT	@ Pittsburgh Penguins (1996–97)	1–0–0	W
2	October 11, 1996	2–6	@ Washington Capitals (1996–97)	1–1–0	L
3	October 12, 1996	7–4	@ Toronto Maple Leafs (1996–97)	2–1–0	W
4	October 15, 1996	4–0	@ Buffalo Sabres (1996–97)	3–1–0	W
5	October 20, 1996	5–2	New York Rangers (1996–97)	4–1–0	W
6	October 22, 1996	6–3	@ New York Islanders (1996–97)	5–1–0	W
7	October 24, 1996	2–5	Ottawa Senators (1996–97)	5–2–0	L
8	October 26, 1996	1–4	New Jersey Devils (1996–97)	5–3–0	L
9	October 29, 1996	2–2 OT	Chicago Blackhawks (1996–97)	5–3–1	T
10	October 31, 1996	3–4	Philadelphia Flyers (1996–97)	5–4–1	L

November: 2–10–1 (home: 1–5–1; road: 1–5–0)

Game	Date	Score	Opponent	Record	Recap
11	November 2, 1996	1–2	@ New Jersey Devils (1996–97)	5–5–1	L
12	November 4, 1996	5–3	@ New York Rangers (1996–97)	6–5–1	W
13	November 6, 1996	1–2	Washington Capitals (1996–97)	6–6–1	L
14	November 8, 1996	5–5 OT	Pittsburgh Penguins (1996–97)	6–6–2	T
15	November 10, 1996	2–4	@ Detroit Red Wings (1996–97)	6–7–2	L
16	November 14, 1996	3–5	@ St. Louis Blues (1996–97)	6–8–2	L
17	November 16, 1996	3–6	@ New Jersey Devils (1996–97)	6–9–2	L
18	November 19, 1996	3–0	Los Angeles Kings (1996–97)	7–9–2	W
19	November 23, 1996	1–2	Philadelphia Flyers (1996–97)	7–10–2	L
20	November 25, 1996	2–4	@ Montreal Canadiens (1996–97)	7–11–2	L
21	November 27, 1996	0–3	Buffalo Sabres (1996–97)	7–12–2	L
22	November 29, 1996	1–2	Dallas Stars (1996–97)	7–13–2	L
23	November 30, 1996	3–6	Hartford Whalers (1996–97)	7–14–2	L

December: 5–5–3 (home: 2–1–3; road: 3–4–0)

Game	Date	Score	Opponent	Record	Recap
24	December 4, 1996	1–3	@ Mighty Ducks of Anaheim (1996–97)	7–15–2	L
25	December 5, 1996	2–1	@ Los Angeles Kings (1996–97)	8–15–2	W
26	December 7, 1996	4–3	@ San Jose Sharks (1996–97)	9–15–2	W
27	December 12, 1996	2–2 OT	Edmonton Oilers (1996–97)	9–15–3	T
28	December 14, 1996	4–1	New York Islanders (1996–97)	10–15–3	W
29	December 16, 1996	4–2	@ Montreal Canadiens (1996–97)	11–15–3	W
30	December 18, 1996	3–5	@ Buffalo Sabres (1996–97)	11–16–3	L
31	December 19, 1996	0–3	@ Boston Bruins (1996–97)	11–17–3	L
32	December 21, 1996	5–6 OT	@ Hartford Whalers (1996–97)	11–18–3	L
33	December 23, 1996	1–3	Washington Capitals (1996–97)	11–19–3	L
34	December 26, 1996	3–3 OT	Florida Panthers (1996–97)	11–19–4	T
35	December 28, 1996	4–4 OT	Montreal Canadiens (1996–97)	11–19–5	T
36	December 31, 1996	4–2	New York Rangers (1996–97)	12–19–5	W

January: 6–5–1 (home: 2–1–1; road: 4–4–0)

Game	Date	Score	Opponent	Record	Recap
37	January 3, 1997	3–2	Mighty Ducks of Anaheim (1996–97)	13–19–5	W
38	January 4, 1997	3–7	@ Pittsburgh Penguins (1996–97)	13–20–5	L
39	January 6, 1997	4–3	@ Ottawa Senators (1996–97)	14–20–5	W
40	January 8, 1997	4–3	@ New York Rangers (1996–97)	15–20–5	W
41	January 9, 1997	3–1	@ Philadelphia Flyers (1996–97)	16–20–5	W
42	January 11, 1997	4–4 OT	New York Islanders (1996–97)	16–20–6	T
43	January 13, 1997	2–0	@ Chicago Blackhawks (1996–97)	17–20–6	W
44	January 15, 1997	2–4	@ Colorado Avalanche (1996–97)	17–21–6	L
45	January 21, 1997	3–2 OT	Colorado Avalanche (1996–97)	18–21–6	W
46	January 25, 1997	2–3	@ Florida Panthers (1996–97)	18–22–6	L
47	January 27, 1997	3–5	@ Ottawa Senators (1996–97)	18–23–6	L
48	January 30, 1997	1–4	Montreal Canadiens (1996–97)	18–24–6	L

February: 6–6–1 (home: 5–2–1; road: 1–4–0)

Game	Date	Score	Opponent	Record	Recap
49	February 1, 1997	0–3	Boston Bruins (1996–97)	18–25–6	L
50	February 4, 1997	2–0	@ Phoenix Coyotes (1996–97)	19–25–6	W
51	February 5, 1997	0–4	@ Dallas Stars (1996–97)	19–26–6	L
52	February 8, 1997	1–3	Buffalo Sabres (1996–97)	19–27–6	L
53	February 12, 1997	2–5	@ Florida Panthers (1996–97)	19–28–6	L
54	February 14, 1997	4–5 OT	@ Washington Capitals (1996–97)	19–29–6	L
55	February 15, 1997	4–1	Washington Capitals (1996–97)	20–29–6	W
56	February 17, 1997	3–3 OT	Detroit Red Wings (1996–97)	20–29–7	T
57	February 20, 1997	5–2	Philadelphia Flyers (1996–97)	21–29–7	W
58	February 22, 1997	3–1	New Jersey Devils (1996–97)	22–29–7	W
59	February 23, 1997	4–3	San Jose Sharks (1996–97)	23–29–7	W
60	February 25, 1997	3–2	St. Louis Blues (1996–97)	24–29–7	W
61	February 27, 1997	2–6	@ Boston Bruins (1996–97)	24–30–7	L

March: 5–8–1 (home: 3–6–0; road: 2–2–1)

Game	Date	Score	Opponent	Record	Recap
62	March 1, 1997	2–0	Florida Panthers (1996–97)	25–30–7	W
63	March 4, 1997	6–3	@ New York Islanders (1996–97)	26–30–7	W
64	March 6, 1997	0–5	Phoenix Coyotes (1996–97)	26–31–7	L
65	March 8, 1997	4–6	Boston Bruins (1996–97)	26–32–7	L
66	March 9, 1997	2–1 OT	Calgary Flames (1996–97)	27–32–7	W
67	March 13, 1997	0–3	New York Islanders (1996–97)	27–33–7	L
68	March 15, 1997	2–5	Vancouver Canucks (1996–97)	27–34–7	L
69	March 16, 1997	1–3	Toronto Maple Leafs (1996–97)	27–35–7	L
70	March 19, 1997	1–3	@ Edmonton Oilers (1996–97)	27–36–7	L
71	March 21, 1997	4–3 OT	@ Calgary Flames (1996–97)	28–36–7	W
72	March 22, 1997	2–3	@ Vancouver Canucks (1996–97)	28–37–7	L
73	March 25, 1997	5–0	Ottawa Senators (1996–97)	29–37–7	W
74	March 27, 1997	2–5	Hartford Whalers (1996–97)	29–38–7	L
75	March 29, 1997	1–1 OT	@ Florida Panthers (1996–97)	29–38–8	T

April: 3–2–2 (home: 1–0–1; road: 2–2–1)

Game	Date	Score	Opponent	Record	Recap
76	April 1, 1997	1–1 OT	@ Philadelphia Flyers (1996–97)	29–38–9	T
77	April 4, 1997	0–3	@ New Jersey Devils (1996–97)	29–39–9	L
78	April 5, 1997	3–2	@ New York Islanders (1996–97)	30–39–9	W
79	April 8, 1997	2–2 OT	New Jersey Devils (1996–97)	30–39–10	T
80	April 10, 1997	4–3	Pittsburgh Penguins (1996–97)	31–39–10	W
81	April 11, 1997	4–2	@ New York Rangers (1996–97)	32–39–10	W
82	April 13, 1997	1–2	@ Hartford Whalers (1996–97)	32–40–10	L

Legend: W Win (2 points) L Loss (0 points) T Tie (1 point)

== Player statistics ==
=== Scoring ===
- Position abbreviations: C = Center; D = Defense; G = Goaltender; LW = Left wing; RW = Right wing
- † = Joined team via a transaction (e.g., trade, waivers, signing) during the season. Stats reflect time with the Lightning only.
- ‡ = Left team via a transaction (e.g., trade, waivers, release) during the season. Stats reflect time with the Lightning only.

No.	Player	Pos	Regular season					
No.	Player	Pos	GP	G	A	Pts	+/-	PIM
77	Chris Gratton	C	82	30	32	62	−28	201
22	Dino Ciccarelli	RW	77	35	25	60	−11	116
12	John Cullen	C	70	18	37	55	−14	95
7	Rob Zamuner	LW	82	17	33	50	3	56
44	Roman Hamrlik	D	79	12	28	40	−29	57
11	Shawn Burr	LW	74	14	21	35	5	106
29	Alex Selivanov	RW	69	15	18	33	−3	61
18	Daymond Langkow	C	79	15	13	28	1	35
28	Patrick Poulin	C	73	12	14	26	−16	56
2	Bill Houlder	D	79	4	21	25	16	30
19	Brian Bradley	C	35	7	17	24	2	16
34	Mikael Andersson	LW	70	5	14	19	1	8
15	Paul Ysebaert	C	39	5	12	17	1	4
55	Drew Bannister‡	D	64	4	13	17	−21	44
24	Jason Wiemer	C	63	9	5	14	−13	134
27	David Shaw	D	57	1	10	11	1	72
9	Jeff Toms	C	34	2	8	10	2	10
4	Cory Cross	D	72	4	5	9	6	95
5	Igor Ulanov	D	59	1	7	8	2	108
20	Rudy Poeschek	RW	60	0	6	6	−3	120
6	Jeff Norton†	D	13	0	5	5	0	16
74	Brantt Myhres	RW	47	3	1	4	1	136
23	Brian Bellows‡	LW	7	1	2	3	−4	0
92	Aaron Gavey‡	C	16	1	2	3	−1	12
17	Brent Peterson	LW	17	2	0	2	−4	4
8	Jamie Huscroft†	D	13	0	1	1	−4	34
32	Corey Schwab	G	31	0	1	1		10
31	Rick Tabaracci†	G	55	0	1	1		12
10	Paul Brousseau	RW	6	0	0	0	−4	0
25	Allan Egeland	C	4	0	0	0	−3	5
93	Daren Puppa	G	6	0	0	0		2
26	Jay Wells	D	21	0	0	0	−3	13
35	Derek Wilkinson	G	5	0	0	0		0
6	Craig Wolanin‡	D	15	0	0	0	−9	8

=== Goaltending ===
- † = Joined team via a transaction (e.g., trade, waivers, signing) during the season. Stats reflect time with the Lightning only.

No.	Player	Regular season									
No.	Player	GP	W	L	T	SA	GA	GAA	SV%	SO	TOI
31	Rick Tabaracci†	55	20	25	6	1415	138	2.75	.902	4	3012
32	Corey Schwab	31	11	12	1	719	74	3.04	.897	2	1462
93	Daren Puppa	6	1	1	2	150	14	2.59	.907	0	325
35	Derek Wilkinson	5	0	2	1	72	12	4.26	.833	0	169

== Awards and records ==
=== Awards ===
Type	Award/honor	Recipient	Ref
League (in-season)	NHL All-Star Game selection	Dino Ciccarelli (Note: Ciccarelli was voted to the starting lineup.)	
League (in-season)	NHL Rookie of the Month	Daymond Langkow (February)	

=== Milestones ===
Milestone	Player	Date	Ref
First game	Brent Peterson	November 2, 1996	

== Draft picks ==
Tampa Bay's draft picks at the 1996 NHL entry draft held at the Kiel Center in St. Louis, Missouri.

Round	#	Player	Nationality	College/Junior/Club team (League)
1	16	Mario Larocque	Canada	Hull Olympiques (QMJHL)
3	69	Curtis Tipler	Canada	Regina Pats (WHL)
5	125	Jason Robinson	Canada	Niagara Falls Thunder (OHL)
6	152	Nikolai Ignatov	Russia	CSKA Moscow (Russia)
6	157	Xavier Delisle	Canada	Granby Predateurs (QMJHL)
7	179	Pavel Kubina	Czech Republic	HC Vitkovice (Czech Republic)

== See also ==
- 1996–97 NHL season
