= 1996–97 San Jose Sharks season =

1996–97 San Jose Sharks
- Division: 7th Pacific
- Conference: 13th Western
- 1996–97 record: 27–47–8
- Home record: 14–23–4
- Road record: 13–24–4
- Goals for: 211
- Goals against: 278

Team information
- General manager: Dean Lombardi
- Coach: Al Sims
- Captain: Todd Gill
- Alternate captains: Tony Granato; Owen Nolan
- Arena: San Jose Arena
- Average attendance: 17,420
- Minor league affiliates: Kentucky Thoroughblades; Louisville RiverFrogs

Team leaders
- Goals: Owen Nolan (31)
- Assists: Jeff Friesen (34)
- Points: Owen Nolan (63)
- Penalty minutes: Andrei Nazarov (222)
- Plus/minus: Tim Hunter (0); Michal Sykora (0)
- Wins: Kelly Hrudey (16)
- Goals against average: Chris Terreri (2.75)

The 1996–97 San Jose Sharks season was the Sharks' sixth season of operation in the National Hockey League. The Sharks again failed to make the playoffs, finishing 13th in the Western Conference.

== Offseason ==
Defenseman Todd Gill was named team captain, following the departure of Jeff Odgers.

== Regular season ==
On October 18, the Sharks scored three short-handed goals in a 4–1 win over the Mighty Ducks of Anaheim.

The Sharks finished the regular season last in scoring (211 goals for) and had the most power-play opportunities against (409).

=== Final standings ===
Pacific Division
No.	CR		GP	W	L	T	GF	GA	Pts
1	1	**Colorado Avalanche**	82	49	24	9	277	205	107
2	4	**Mighty Ducks of Anaheim**	82	36	33	13	243	231	85
3	7	**Edmonton Oilers**	82	36	37	9	252	247	81
4	9	Vancouver Canucks	82	35	40	7	257	273	77
5	10	Calgary Flames	82	32	41	9	214	239	73
6	12	Los Angeles Kings	82	28	43	11	214	268	67
7	13	San Jose Sharks	82	27	47	8	211	278	62

Note: CR = Conference rank; GP = Games played; W = Wins; L = Losses; T = Ties; GF = Goals for; GA = Goals against; Pts = Points
Bolded teams qualified for the playoffs.

Western Conference
R		Div	GP	W	L	T	GF	GA	Pts
**1**	**p – Colorado Avalanche**	**PAC**	**82**	**49**	**24**	**9**	**277**	**205**	**107**
**2**	**Dallas Stars**	**CEN**	**82**	**48**	**26**	**8**	**252**	**198**	**104**
**3**	**Detroit Red Wings**	**CEN**	**82**	**38**	**26**	**18**	**253**	**197**	**94**
**4**	**Mighty Ducks of Anaheim**	**PAC**	**82**	**36**	**33**	**13**	**245**	**233**	**85**
**5**	**Phoenix Coyotes**	**CEN**	**82**	**38**	**37**	**7**	**240**	**243**	**83**
**6**	**St. Louis Blues**	**CEN**	**82**	**36**	**35**	**11**	**236**	**239**	**83**
**7**	**Edmonton Oilers**	**PAC**	**82**	**36**	**37**	**9**	**252**	**247**	**81**
**8**	**Chicago Blackhawks**	**CEN**	**82**	**34**	**35**	**13**	**223**	**210**	**81**
9	Vancouver Canucks	PAC	82	35	40	7	257	273	77
10	Calgary Flames	PAC	82	32	41	9	214	239	73
11	Toronto Maple Leafs	CEN	82	30	44	8	230	273	68
12	Los Angeles Kings	PAC	82	28	43	11	214	268	67
13	San Jose Sharks	PAC	82	27	47	8	211	278	62

Divisions: CEN – Central, PAC – Pacific

bold – Qualified for playoffs; p – Won Presidents' Trophy

== Schedule and results ==
1996–97 regular season
October: 5–5–3 (home: 1–1–2; road: 4–4–1)

Game	Date	Score	Opponent	Record	Recap
1	October 5, 1996	2–2 OT	New York Islanders (1996–97)	0–0–1	T
2	October 6, 1996	7–6 OT	@ Los Angeles Kings (1996–97)	1–0–1	W
3	October 8, 1996	0–6	@ Colorado Avalanche (1996–97)	1–1–1	L
4	October 10, 1996	1–4	@ Phoenix Coyotes (1996–97)	1–2–1	L
5	October 12, 1996	3–5	Boston Bruins (1996–97)	1–3–1	L
6	October 16, 1996	3–3 OT	Florida Panthers (1996–97)	1–3–2	T
7	October 18, 1996	4–1	@ Mighty Ducks of Anaheim (1996–97)	2–3–2	W
8	October 20, 1996	3–2	@ St. Louis Blues (1996–97)	3–3–2	W
9	October 22, 1996	3–4	@ Toronto Maple Leafs (1996–97)	3–4–2	L
10	October 24, 1996	1–3	@ New Jersey Devils (1996–97)	3–5–2	L
11	October 26, 1996	2–2 OT	@ New York Islanders (1996–97)	3–5–3	T
12	October 27, 1996	6–2	@ Chicago Blackhawks (1996–97)	4–5–3	W
13	October 30, 1996	3–1	Calgary Flames (1996–97)	5–5–3	W

November: 3–8–1 (home: 3–5–0; road: 0–3–1)

Game	Date	Score	Opponent	Record	Recap
14	November 1, 1996	3–4	@ Mighty Ducks of Anaheim (1996–97)	5–6–3	L
15	November 2, 1996	4–3 OT	Montreal Canadiens (1996–97)	6–6–3	W
16	November 6, 1996	1–4	Colorado Avalanche (1996–97)	6–7–3	L
17	November 8, 1996	3–1	Dallas Stars (1996–97)	7–7–3	W
18	November 12, 1996	3–4	Hartford Whalers (1996–97)	7–8–3	L
19	November 15, 1996	1–5	@ Detroit Red Wings (1996–97)	7–9–3	L
20	November 16, 1996	2–2 OT	@ Philadelphia Flyers (1996–97)	7–9–4	T
21	November 18, 1996	2–4	@ Boston Bruins (1996–97)	7–10–4	L
22	November 21, 1996	1–6	Detroit Red Wings (1996–97)	7–11–4	L
23	November 23, 1996	0–3	Mighty Ducks of Anaheim (1996–97)	7–12–4	L
24	November 27, 1996	3–2	Chicago Blackhawks (1996–97)	8–12–4	W
25	November 29, 1996	2–4	Edmonton Oilers (1996–97)	8–13–4	L

December: 6–6–0 (home: 2–3–0; road: 4–3–0)

Game	Date	Score	Opponent	Record	Recap
26	December 1, 1996	4–3	@ St. Louis Blues (1996–97)	9–13–4	W
27	December 4, 1996	2–1	@ Dallas Stars (1996–97)	10–13–4	W
28	December 7, 1996	3–4	Tampa Bay Lightning (1996–97)	10–14–4	L
29	December 11, 1996	3–2	Washington Capitals (1996–97)	11–14–4	W
30	December 13, 1996	0–4	Pittsburgh Penguins (1996–97)	11–15–4	L
31	December 17, 1996	3–6	Toronto Maple Leafs (1996–97)	11–16–4	L
32	December 20, 1996	2–3	@ Washington Capitals (1996–97)	11–17–4	L
33	December 21, 1996	1–3	@ Pittsburgh Penguins (1996–97)	11–18–4	L
34	December 23, 1996	2–1	@ Dallas Stars (1996–97)	12–18–4	W
35	December 26, 1996	6–1	Vancouver Canucks (1996–97)	13–18–4	W
36	December 28, 1996	3–5	@ Edmonton Oilers (1996–97)	13–19–4	L
37	December 31, 1996	5–1	@ Calgary Flames (1996–97)	14–19–4	W

January: 4–7–1 (home: 2–4–1; road: 2–3–0)

Game	Date	Score	Opponent	Record	Recap
38	January 2, 1997	1–4	Philadelphia Flyers (1996–97)	14–20–4	L
39	January 4, 1997	3–4	Calgary Flames (1996–97)	14–21–4	L
40	January 7, 1997	1–1 OT	Buffalo Sabres (1996–97)	14–21–5	T
41	January 9, 1997	3–4	St. Louis Blues (1996–97)	14–22–5	L
42	January 11, 1997	2–1	@ Edmonton Oilers (1996–97)	15–22–5	W
43	January 13, 1997	5–4	Phoenix Coyotes (1996–97)	16–22–5	W
44	January 20, 1997	1–6	@ Vancouver Canucks (1996–97)	16–23–5	L
45	January 22, 1997	7–2	Los Angeles Kings (1996–97)	17–23–5	W
46	January 24, 1997	1–3	New Jersey Devils (1996–97)	17–24–5	L
47	January 27, 1997	2–5	@ Vancouver Canucks (1996–97)	17–25–5	L
48	January 29, 1997	1–3	@ Edmonton Oilers (1996–97)	17–26–5	L
49	January 30, 1997	6–3	@ Calgary Flames (1996–97)	18–26–5	W

February: 4–7–2 (home: 3–2–0; road: 1–5–2)

Game	Date	Score	Opponent	Record	Recap
50	February 1, 1997	2–1	Colorado Avalanche (1996–97)	19–26–5	W
51	February 3, 1997	2–4	Chicago Blackhawks (1996–97)	19–27–5	L
52	February 5, 1997	3–2	Los Angeles Kings (1996–97)	20–27–5	W
53	February 8, 1997	3–3 OT	@ Ottawa Senators (1996–97)	20–27–6	T
54	February 10, 1997	2–4	@ Montreal Canadiens (1996–97)	20–28–6	L
55	February 12, 1997	1–7	@ Detroit Red Wings (1996–97)	20–29–6	L
56	February 13, 1997	3–7	@ Chicago Blackhawks (1996–97)	20–30–6	L
57	February 16, 1997	2–6	@ Buffalo Sabres (1996–97)	20–31–6	L
58	February 18, 1997	3–1	Dallas Stars (1996–97)	21–31–6	W
59	February 20, 1997	1–6	Vancouver Canucks (1996–97)	21–32–6	L
60	February 23, 1997	3–4	@ Tampa Bay Lightning (1996–97)	21–33–6	L
61	February 25, 1997	2–2 OT	@ Florida Panthers (1996–97)	21–33–7	T
62	February 28, 1997	3–2	@ Hartford Whalers (1996–97)	22–33–7	W

March: 3–10–0 (home: 2–6–0; road: 1–4–0)

Game	Date	Score	Opponent	Record	Recap
63	March 1, 1997	2–3	@ Toronto Maple Leafs (1996–97)	22–34–7	L
64	March 3, 1997	4–5 OT	@ New York Rangers (1996–97)	22–35–7	L
65	March 6, 1997	2–0	Ottawa Senators (1996–97)	23–35–7	W
66	March 9, 1997	1–2	New York Rangers (1996–97)	23–36–7	L
67	March 11, 1997	3–4	St. Louis Blues (1996–97)	23–37–7	L
68	March 14, 1997	1–4	Phoenix Coyotes (1996–97)	23–38–7	L
69	March 15, 1997	4–7	Detroit Red Wings (1996–97)	23–39–7	L
70	March 19, 1997	2–4	@ Calgary Flames (1996–97)	23–40–7	L
71	March 20, 1997	2–1	@ Vancouver Canucks (1996–97)	24–40–7	W
72	March 22, 1997	1–2	@ Los Angeles Kings (1996–97)	24–41–7	L
73	March 24, 1997	1–5	Edmonton Oilers (1996–97)	24–42–7	L
74	March 26, 1997	1–2	Toronto Maple Leafs (1996–97)	24–43–7	L
75	March 28, 1997	4–3	Edmonton Oilers (1996–97)	25–43–7	W

April: 2–4–1 (home: 1–2–1; road: 1–2–0)

Game	Date	Score	Opponent	Record	Recap
76	April 1, 1997	1–7	@ Phoenix Coyotes (1996–97)	25–44–7	L
77	April 2, 1997	5–5 OT	Mighty Ducks of Anaheim (1996–97)	25–44–8	T
78	April 4, 1997	7–6 OT	Colorado Avalanche (1996–97)	26–44–8	W
79	April 7, 1997	2–3	Vancouver Canucks (1996–97)	26–45–8	L
80	April 9, 1997	4–1	@ Colorado Avalanche (1996–97)	27–45–8	W
81	April 11, 1997	3–4	Mighty Ducks of Anaheim (1996–97)	27–46–8	L
82	April 12, 1997	1–4	@ Los Angeles Kings (1996–97)	27–47–8	L

Legend: W Win (2 points) L Loss (0 points) T Tie (1 point)

== Player statistics ==
=== Scoring ===
- Position abbreviations: C = Center; D = Defense; G = Goaltender; LW = Left wing; RW = Right wing
- † = Joined team via a transaction (e.g., trade, waivers, signing) during the season. Stats reflect time with the Sharks only.
- ‡ = Left team via a transaction (e.g., trade, waivers, release) during the season. Stats reflect time with the Sharks only.

No.	Player	Pos	Regular season					
No.	Player	Pos	GP	G	A	Pts	+/-	PIM
11	Owen Nolan	RW	72	31	32	63	−19	155
39	Jeff Friesen	LW	82	28	34	62	−8	75
9	Bernie Nicholls	C	65	12	33	45	−21	63
25	Viktor Kozlov	C	78	16	25	41	−16	40
21	Tony Granato	RW	76	25	15	40	−7	159
8	Darren Turcotte	C	65	16	21	37	−8	16
62	Andrei Nazarov	LW	60	12	15	27	−4	222
17	Steve Guolla	C	43	13	8	21	−10	14
23	Todd Gill	D	79	0	21	21	−20	101
22	Ulf Dahlen‡	LW	43	8	11	19	−11	8
4	Greg Hawgood	D	63	6	12	18	−22	69
10	Marcus Ragnarsson	D	69	3	14	17	−18	63
33	Marty McSorley	D	57	4	12	16	−6	186
3	Doug Bodger	D	81	1	15	16	−14	64
42	Shean Donovan	RW	73	9	6	15	−18	42
43	Al Iafrate	D	38	6	9	15	−10	91
12	Ron Sutter†	C	78	5	7	12	−8	65
22 (Note: Errey wore number 14 in his first two games.)	Bob Errey†	LW	30	3	6	9	−2	20
44	Vlastimil Kroupa	D	35	2	6	8	−17	12
40	Mike Rathje	D	31	0	8	8	−1	21
38	Michal Sykora‡	D	35	2	5	7	0	59
16	Dody Wood	C	44	3	2	5	−3	193
7	Ville Peltonen	LW	28	2	3	5	−8	0
18	Chris Tancill	C	25	4	0	4	−5	8
19	Tim Hunter	RW	46	0	4	4	0	135
36	Todd Ewen	RW	51	0	2	2	−5	162
14	Ray Whitney	LW	12	0	2	2	−6	4
5	Jason Widmer	D	2	0	1	1	1	0
15	Alexei Yegorov	RW	2	0	1	1	1	0
20 (Note: Belfour wore number 30 in his first game.)	Ed Belfour†	G	13	0	0	0		8
91	Jan Caloun	RW	2	0	0	0	−2	0
31	Wade Flaherty	G	7	0	0	0		0
28	Iain Fraser	C	2	0	0	0	−1	2
32	Kelly Hrudey	G	48	0	0	0		0
26	Chris Lipuma‡†	D	8	0	0	0	−2	22
30	Chris Terreri‡	G	22	0	0	0		0

=== Goaltending ===
No.	Player	Regular season									
No.	Player	GP	W	L	T	SA	GA	GAA	SV%	SO	TOI
32	Kelly Hrudey	48	16	24	5	1263	140	3.19	.889	0	2631
30	Chris Terreri	22	6	10	3	553	55	2.75	.901	0	1200
20	Ed Belfour	13	3	9	0	371	43	3.41	.884	1	757
31	Wade Flaherty	7	2	4	0	202	31	5.18	.847	0	359

== Awards and records ==
=== Awards ===
Type	Award/honor	Recipient	Ref
League (annual)	Bill Masterton Memorial Trophy	Tony Granato	
League (in-season)	NHL All-Star Game selection	Tony Granato (Note: Granato was selected by the commissioner.)	
League (in-season)	NHL All-Star Game selection	Owen Nolan	
Team	Sharks Player of the Year	Jeff Friesen	
Team	Sharks Rookie of the Year	Steve Guolla	

=== Milestones ===
Milestone	Player	Date	Ref
1,000th game played	Bernie Nicholls	October 20, 1996	
First game	Steve Guolla	January 7, 1997	

== Draft picks ==
San Jose's picks at the 1996 NHL entry draft held at the Kiel Center in St. Louis, Missouri.

Round	#	Player	Position	Nationality	College/Junior/Club team
1	2	Andrei Zyuzin	Defense	Russia	Salavat Yulajev
1	21	Marco Sturm	Right wing	Germany	Landshut EV
3	55	Terry Friesen	Goalie	Canada	Swift Current Broncos
4	102	Matt Bradley	Right wing	Canada	Kingston Frontenacs
6	137	Michel Larocque	Goalie	Germany	Boston University
7	164	Jake Deadmarsh	Defense	Canada	Kamloops Blazers
8	191	Cory Cyrenne	Center	Canada	Brandon Wheat Kings
9	217	David Thibeault	Left wing	Canada	Drummondville Voltigeurs

== See also ==
- 1996–97 NHL season
