= 1996–97 Washington Capitals season =

NHL hockey team season

1996–97 Washington Capitals
- Division: 5th Atlantic
- Conference: 9th Eastern
- 1996–97 record: 33–40–9
- Home record: 19–17–5
- Road record: 14–23–4
- Goals for: 214
- Goals against: 231

Team information
- General manager: David Poile
- Coach: Jim Schoenfeld
- Captain: Dale Hunter
- Arena: US Airways Arena
- Average attendance: 15,761
- Minor league affiliates: Portland Pirates; Hampton Roads Admirals

Team leaders
- Goals: Peter Bondra (46)
- Assists: Dale Hunter (32)
- Points: Peter Bondra (77)
- Penalty minutes: Craig Berube (218)
- Plus/minus: Sylvain Cote (+11)
- Wins: Jim Carey (17)
- Goals against average: Olaf Kolzig (2.59)

The 1996–97 Washington Capitals season was the team's 23rd season of play. The Capitals finished fifth in the division, and ninth in the conference, and failed to make the playoffs for the first time since the 1981–82 season. It was their last full season playing at USAir Arena.

== Regular season ==
=== Final standings ===
Atlantic Division
No.	CR		GP	W	L	T	GF	GA	Pts
1	1	**New Jersey Devils**	82	45	23	14	231	182	104
2	3	**Philadelphia Flyers**	82	45	24	13	274	217	103
3	4	**Florida Panthers**	82	35	28	19	221	201	89
4	5	**New York Rangers**	82	38	34	10	258	231	86
5	9	Washington Capitals	82	33	40	9	214	231	75
6	11	Tampa Bay Lightning	82	32	40	10	217	247	74
7	12	New York Islanders	82	29	41	12	240	250	70

Eastern Conference
R		Div	GP	W	L	T	GF	GA	Pts
**1**	**New Jersey Devils**	**ATL**	**82**	**45**	**23**	**14**	**231**	**182**	**104**
**2**	**Buffalo Sabres**	**NE**	**82**	**40**	**30**	**12**	**237**	**208**	**92**
**3**	**Philadelphia Flyers**	**ATL**	**82**	**45**	**24**	**13**	**274**	**217**	**103**
**4**	**Florida Panthers**	**ATL**	**82**	**35**	**28**	**19**	**221**	**201**	**89**
**5**	**New York Rangers**	**ATL**	**82**	**38**	**34**	**10**	**258**	**231**	**86**
**6**	**Pittsburgh Penguins**	**NE**	**82**	**38**	**36**	**8**	**285**	**280**	**84**
**7**	**Ottawa Senators**	**NE**	**82**	**31**	**36**	**15**	**226**	**234**	**77**
**8**	**Montreal Canadiens**	**NE**	**82**	**31**	**36**	**15**	**249**	**276**	**77**
9	Washington Capitals	ATL	82	33	40	9	214	231	75
10	Hartford Whalers	NE	82	32	39	11	226	256	75
11	Tampa Bay Lightning	ATL	82	32	40	10	217	247	74
12	New York Islanders	ATL	82	29	41	12	240	250	70
13	Boston Bruins	NE	82	26	47	9	234	300	61

Divisions: ATL – Atlantic, NE – Northeast

bold – Qualified for playoffs

== Schedule and results ==
1996–97 regular season
October: 4–6–0 (home: 2–3–0; road: 2–3–0)

Game	Date	Score	Opponent	Record	Recap
1	October 5, 1996	2–5	Chicago Blackhawks (1996–97)	0–1–0	L
2	October 8, 1996	3–5	@ Dallas Stars (1996–97)	0–2–0	L
3	October 11, 1996	6–2	Tampa Bay Lightning (1996–97)	1–2–0	W
4	October 12, 1996	3–4	Los Angeles Kings (1996–97)	1–3–0	L
5	October 18, 1996	1–4	Buffalo Sabres (1996–97)	1–4–0	L
6	October 19, 1996	1–2	@ Pittsburgh Penguins (1996–97)	1–5–0	L
7	October 23, 1996	3–2	@ New York Rangers (1996–97)	2–5–0	W
8	October 26, 1996	6–4	@ St. Louis Blues (1996–97)	3–5–0	W
9	October 28, 1996	0–1	@ Colorado Avalanche (1996–97)	3–6–0	L
10	October 30, 1996	4–2	Philadelphia Flyers (1996–97)	4–6–0	W

November: 9–5–1 (home: 4–2–1; road: 5–3–0)

Game	Date	Score	Opponent	Record	Recap
11	November 1, 1996	4–2	Pittsburgh Penguins (1996–97)	5–6–0	W
12	November 2, 1996	1–6	@ New York Islanders (1996–97)	5–7–0	L
13	November 6, 1996	2–1	@ Tampa Bay Lightning (1996–97)	6–7–0	W
14	November 7, 1996	2–4	@ Florida Panthers (1996–97)	6–8–0	L
15	November 9, 1996	3–2	New York Rangers (1996–97)	7–8–0	W
16	November 12, 1996	2–3 OT	@ New Jersey Devils (1996–97)	7–9–0	L
17	November 14, 1996	5–2	@ Philadelphia Flyers (1996–97)	8–9–0	W
18	November 15, 1996	3–1	Montreal Canadiens (1996–97)	9–9–0	W
19	November 18, 1996	4–2	@ Florida Panthers (1996–97)	10–9–0	W
20	November 19, 1996	2–2 OT	Boston Bruins (1996–97)	10–9–1	T
21	November 22, 1996	5–1	@ New Jersey Devils (1996–97)	11–9–1	W
22	November 23, 1996	4–3	New Jersey Devils (1996–97)	12–9–1	W
23	November 27, 1996	1–2	Ottawa Senators (1996–97)	12–10–1	L
24	November 29, 1996	0–2	New York Islanders (1996–97)	12–11–1	L
25	November 30, 1996	2–0	@ Montreal Canadiens (1996–97)	13–11–1	W

December: 2–9–2 (home: 1–2–1; road: 1–7–1)

Game	Date	Score	Opponent	Record	Recap
26	December 4, 1996	0–2	Detroit Red Wings (1996–97)	13–12–1	L
27	December 6, 1996	3–5	Pittsburgh Penguins (1996–97)	13–13–1	L
28	December 7, 1996	0–2	@ New York Islanders (1996–97)	13–14–1	L
29	December 11, 1996	2–3	@ San Jose Sharks (1996–97)	13–15–1	L
30	December 13, 1996	4–5	@ Mighty Ducks of Anaheim (1996–97)	13–16–1	L
31	December 14, 1996	4–4 OT	@ Los Angeles Kings (1996–97)	13–16–2	T
32	December 17, 1996	3–4	@ Phoenix Coyotes (1996–97)	13–17–2	L
33	December 20, 1996	3–2	San Jose Sharks (1996–97)	14–17–2	W
34	December 21, 1996	3–4	@ Boston Bruins (1996–97)	14–18–2	L
35	December 23, 1996	3–1	@ Tampa Bay Lightning (1996–97)	15–18–2	W
36	December 26, 1996	4–5 OT	@ Detroit Red Wings (1996–97)	15–19–2	L
37	December 28, 1996	1–1 OT	Florida Panthers (1996–97)	15–19–3	T
38	December 30, 1996	3–5	@ Pittsburgh Penguins (1996–97)	15–20–3	L

January: 5–5–2 (home: 4–4–0; road: 1–1–2)

Game	Date	Score	Opponent	Record	Recap
39	January 1, 1997	3–2 OT	Hartford Whalers (1996–97)	16–20–3	W
40	January 3, 1997	3–0	Phoenix Coyotes (1996–97)	17–20–3	W
41	January 4, 1997	1–1 OT	@ Hartford Whalers (1996–97)	17–20–4	T
42	January 9, 1997	2–0	New York Rangers (1996–97)	18–20–4	W
43	January 11, 1997	3–3 OT	@ Philadelphia Flyers (1996–97)	18–20–5	T
44	January 13, 1997	6–3	Toronto Maple Leafs (1996–97)	19–20–5	W
45	January 15, 1997	1–5	@ Ottawa Senators (1996–97)	19–21–5	L
46	January 20, 1997	3–2	@ Boston Bruins (1996–97)	20–21–5	W
47	January 22, 1997	3–5	New York Rangers (1996–97)	20–22–5	L
48	January 24, 1997	2–5	Dallas Stars (1996–97)	20–23–5	L
49	January 26, 1997	1–3	Edmonton Oilers (1996–97)	20–24–5	L
50	January 29, 1997	1–2	Philadelphia Flyers (1996–97)	20–25–5	L

February: 4–6–2 (home: 1–2–1; road: 3–4–1)

Game	Date	Score	Opponent	Record	Recap
51	February 1, 1997	3–1	@ Florida Panthers (1996–97)	21–25–5	W
52	February 2, 1997	2–2 OT	@ Buffalo Sabres (1996–97)	21–25–6	T
53	February 7, 1997	2–5	@ Calgary Flames (1996–97)	21–26–6	L
54	February 9, 1997	1–4	@ Edmonton Oilers (1996–97)	21–27–6	L
55	February 11, 1997	5–2	@ Vancouver Canucks (1996–97)	22–27–6	W
56	February 14, 1997	5–4 OT	Tampa Bay Lightning (1996–97)	23–27–6	W
57	February 15, 1997	1–4	@ Tampa Bay Lightning (1996–97)	23–28–6	L
58	February 18, 1997	1–6	Ottawa Senators (1996–97)	23–29–6	L
59	February 22, 1997	0–2	@ Hartford Whalers (1996–97)	23–30–6	L
60	February 24, 1997	3–3 OT	Boston Bruins (1996–97)	23–30–7	T
61	February 26, 1997	3–1	@ Toronto Maple Leafs (1996–97)	24–30–7	W
62	February 28, 1997	1–4	Mighty Ducks of Anaheim (1996–97)	24–31–7	L

March: 6–7–1 (home: 5–3–1; road: 1–4–0)

Game	Date	Score	Opponent	Record	Recap
63	March 2, 1997	0–2	New York Islanders (1996–97)	24–32–7	L
64	March 4, 1997	2–1	Calgary Flames (1996–97)	25–32–7	W
65	March 6, 1997	6–3	Colorado Avalanche (1996–97)	26–32–7	W
66	March 9, 1997	0–5	@ Philadelphia Flyers (1996–97)	26–33–7	L
67	March 11, 1997	4–1	Vancouver Canucks (1996–97)	27–33–7	W
68	March 12, 1997	2–3	@ New York Rangers (1996–97)	27–34–7	L
69	March 15, 1997	2–3	@ New Jersey Devils (1996–97)	27–35–7	L
70	March 16, 1997	5–3	Hartford Whalers (1996–97)	28–35–7	W
71	March 19, 1997	2–2 OT	New Jersey Devils (1996–97)	28–35–8	T
72	March 21, 1997	1–4	Buffalo Sabres (1996–97)	28–36–8	L
73	March 22, 1997	3–1	@ Montreal Canadiens (1996–97)	29–36–8	W
74	March 25, 1997	3–2	St. Louis Blues (1996–97)	30–36–8	W
75	March 26, 1997	3–5	@ Chicago Blackhawks (1996–97)	30–37–8	L
76	March 29, 1997	3–5	Philadelphia Flyers (1996–97)	30–38–8	L

April: 3–2–1 (home: 2–1–1; road: 1–1–0)

Game	Date	Score	Opponent	Record	Recap
77	April 1, 1997	0–1	New Jersey Devils (1996–97)	30–39–8	L
78	April 3, 1997	0–4	@ Ottawa Senators (1996–97)	30–40–8	L
79	April 6, 1997	3–3 OT	Florida Panthers (1996–97)	30–40–9	T
80	April 10, 1997	3–2	Montreal Canadiens (1996–97)	31–40–9	W
81	April 12, 1997	6–2	New York Islanders (1996–97)	32–40–9	W
82	April 13, 1997	8–3	@ Buffalo Sabres (1996–97)	33–40–9	W

Legend: W Win (2 points) L Loss (0 points) T Tie (1 point)

== Player statistics ==
=== Scoring ===
- Position abbreviations: C = Center; D = Defense; G = Goaltender; LW = Left wing; RW = Right wing
- † = Joined team via a transaction (e.g., trade, waivers, signing) during the season. Stats reflect time with the Capitals only.
- ‡ = Left team via a transaction (e.g., trade, waivers, release) during the season. Stats reflect time with the Capitals only.

No.	Player	Pos	Regular season					
No.	Player	Pos	GP	G	A	Pts	+/-	PIM
12	Peter Bondra	RW	77	46	31	77	7	72
32	Dale Hunter	C	82	14	32	46	−2	125
22	Steve Konowalchuk	LW	78	17	25	42	−3	67
90	Joe Juneau	C	58	15	27	42	−11	8
96	Phil Housley	D	77	11	29	40	−10	24
55	Sergei Gonchar	D	57	13	17	30	−11	36
10	Kelly Miller	LW	77	10	14	24	4	33
3	Sylvain Cote	D	57	6	18	24	11	28
20	Michal Pivonka	C	54	7	16	23	−15	22
17	Chris Simon†	LW	42	9	13	22	−1	165
41	Jason Allison‡	C	53	5	17	22	−3	25
13 (Note: Nikolishin wore number 11 in his first game.)	Andrei Nikolishin†	C	59	7	14	21	5	30
6	Calle Johansson	D	65	6	11	17	−2	16
21	Todd Krygier	LW	47	5	11	16	−10	37
77	Adam Oates†	C	17	4	8	12	−2	4
18	Andrew Brunette	LW	23	4	7	11	−3	12
2	Ken Klee	D	80	3	8	11	−5	115
34	Jaroslav Svejkovsky	RW	19	7	3	10	−1	4
92	Rick Tocchet†	RW	13	5	5	10	0	31
29	Joe Reekie	D	65	1	8	9	8	107
24	Mark Tinordi	D	56	2	6	8	3	118
36	Mike Eagles	C/LW	70	1	7	8	−4	42
27	Craig Berube	LW	80	4	3	7	−11	218
33 (Note: Carter wore number 45 in his first ten games.)	Anson Carter‡	RW	19	3	2	5	0	7
19	Brendan Witt	D	44	3	2	5	−20	88
26	Keith Jones‡	RW	11	2	3	5	−2	13
44	Richard Zednik	RW	11	2	1	3	−5	4
23	Kevin Kaminski	C	38	1	2	3	0	130
28	Eric Charron	D	25	1	1	2	1	20
30	Bill Ranford†	G	18	0	1	1		7
45	Patrick Boileau	D	1	0	0	0	0	0
30	Jim Carey‡	G	40	0	0	0		2
37	Olaf Kolzig	G	29	0	0	0		4
9	Curtis Leschyshyn†‡	D	2	0	0	0	0	2
4	Stewart Malgunas	D	6	0	0	0	2	2
14	Pat Peake	C	4	0	0	0	1	4
16	Stefan Ustorf	C	6	0	0	0	−3	2

=== Goaltending ===
- † = Joined team via a transaction (e.g., trade, waivers, signing) during the season. Stats reflect time with the Capitals only.
- ‡ = Left team via a transaction (e.g., trade, waivers, release) during the season. Stats reflect time with the Capitals only.

No.	Player	Regular season									
No.	Player	GP	W	L	T	SA	GA	GAA	SV%	SO	TOI
30	Jim Carey‡	40	17	18	3	984	105	2.75	.893	1	2293
37	Olaf Kolzig	29	8	15	4	758	71	2.59	.906	2	1645
30	Bill Ranford†	18	8	7	2	412	46	2.74	.888	0	1009

== Awards and records ==
=== Awards ===
Type	Award/honor	Recipient	Ref
League (in-season)	NHL All-Star Game selection	Peter Bondra	
League (in-season)	NHL All-Star Game selection	Dale Hunter (Note: Hunter was selected by the commissioner.)	

=== Milestones ===
Milestone	Player	Date	Ref
First game	Anson Carter	October 5, 1996	
First game	Jaroslav Svejkovsky	December 7, 1996	
First game	Patrick Boileau	January 15, 1997	
1,000th game played	Phil Housley	October 30, 1996	

== Draft picks ==
Washington's draft picks at the 1996 NHL entry draft held at the Kiel Center in St. Louis, Missouri.

Round	#	Player	Nationality	College/Junior/Club team (League)
1	4	Alexander Volchkov	Russia	Barrie Colts (OHL)
1	17	Jaroslav Svejkovsky	Czech Republic	Tri-City Americans (WHL)
2	43	Jan Bulis	Czech Republic	Barrie Colts (OHL)
3	58	Sergei Zimakov	Russia	Krylya Sovetov (Russia)
3	74	David Weninger	Canada	Michigan Technological University (WCHA)
3	78	Shawn McNeil	Canada	Kamloops Blazers (WHL)
4	85	Justin Davis	Canada	Kingston Frontenacs (OHL)
5	126	Matt Lahey	Canada	Peterborough Petes (OHL)
6	153	A. J. Van Bruggen	United States	Northern Michigan University (WCHA)
7	180	Michael Anderson	United States	University of Minnesota (WCHA)
8	206	Oleg Orekhovsky	Russia	Dynamo Moscow (Russia)
9	232	Chad Cavanagh	Canada	London Knights (OHL)

== See also ==
- 1996–97 NHL season
