= 1996–97 Vancouver Canucks season =

NHL hockey team season

1996–97 Vancouver Canucks
- Division: 4th Pacific
- Conference: 9th Western
- 1996–97 record: 35–40–7
- Home record: 20–17–4
- Road record: 15–23–3
- Goals for: 257
- Goals against: 273

Team information
- General manager: Pat Quinn
- Coach: Tom Renney
- Captain: Trevor Linden
- Arena: General Motors Place
- Average attendance: 17,320
- Minor league affiliate: Syracuse Crunch

Team leaders
- Goals: Martin Gelinas (35)
- Assists: Alexander Mogilny (42)
- Points: Alexander Mogilny (73)
- Penalty minutes: Gino Odjick (371)
- Plus/minus: David Roberts (+11)
- Wins: Kirk McLean (21)
- Goals against average: Kirk McLean (3.21)

The 1996–97 Vancouver Canucks season was the team's 27th in the National Hockey League (NHL). The Canucks finished fourth in the division, and ninth in the conference, and failed to make the playoffs for the first time since 1990.

== Regular season ==
=== Final standings ===
Pacific Division
| No. | CR | | GP | W | L | T | GF | GA | Pts |
|---|---|---|---|---|---|---|---|---|---|
| 1 | 1 | **Colorado Avalanche** | 82 | 49 | 24 | 9 | 277 | 205 | 107 |
| 2 | 4 | **Mighty Ducks of Anaheim** | 82 | 36 | 33 | 13 | 243 | 231 | 85 |
| 3 | 7 | **Edmonton Oilers** | 82 | 36 | 37 | 9 | 252 | 247 | 81 |
| 4 | 9 | Vancouver Canucks | 82 | 35 | 40 | 7 | 257 | 273 | 77 |
| 5 | 10 | Calgary Flames | 82 | 32 | 41 | 9 | 214 | 239 | 73 |
| 6 | 12 | Los Angeles Kings | 82 | 28 | 43 | 11 | 214 | 268 | 67 |
| 7 | 13 | San Jose Sharks | 82 | 27 | 47 | 8 | 211 | 278 | 62 |

Note: CR = Conference rank; GP = Games played; W = Wins; L = Losses; T = Ties; GF = Goals for; GA = Goals against; Pts = Points
Bolded teams qualified for the playoffs.

Western Conference
| R | | Div | GP | W | L | T | GF | GA | Pts |
|---|---|---|---|---|---|---|---|---|---|
| **1** | **p – Colorado Avalanche** | **PAC** | **82** | **49** | **24** | **9** | **277** | **205** | **107** |
| **2** | **Dallas Stars** | **CEN** | **82** | **48** | **26** | **8** | **252** | **198** | **104** |
| **3** | **Detroit Red Wings** | **CEN** | **82** | **38** | **26** | **18** | **253** | **197** | **94** |
| **4** | **Mighty Ducks of Anaheim** | **PAC** | **82** | **36** | **33** | **13** | **245** | **233** | **85** |
| **5** | **Phoenix Coyotes** | **CEN** | **82** | **38** | **37** | **7** | **240** | **243** | **83** |
| **6** | **St. Louis Blues** | **CEN** | **82** | **36** | **35** | **11** | **236** | **239** | **83** |
| **7** | **Edmonton Oilers** | **PAC** | **82** | **36** | **37** | **9** | **252** | **247** | **81** |
| **8** | **Chicago Blackhawks** | **CEN** | **82** | **34** | **35** | **13** | **223** | **210** | **81** |
| 9 | Vancouver Canucks | PAC | 82 | 35 | 40 | 7 | 257 | 273 | 77 |
| 10 | Calgary Flames | PAC | 82 | 32 | 41 | 9 | 214 | 239 | 73 |
| 11 | Toronto Maple Leafs | CEN | 82 | 30 | 44 | 8 | 230 | 273 | 68 |
| 12 | Los Angeles Kings | PAC | 82 | 28 | 43 | 11 | 214 | 268 | 67 |
| 13 | San Jose Sharks | PAC | 82 | 27 | 47 | 8 | 211 | 278 | 62 |

Divisions: CEN – Central, PAC – Pacific

bold – Qualified for playoffs; p – Won Presidents' Trophy

== Schedule and results ==
1996–97 regular season
October: 5–5–0 (home: 3–3–0; road: 2–2–0)

| Game | Date | Score | Opponent | Record | Recap |
|---|---|---|---|---|---|
| 1 | October 5, 1996 | 3–1 | Calgary Flames (1996–97) | 1–0–0 | W |
| 2 | October 6, 1996 | 0–2 | @ Edmonton Oilers (1996–97) | 1–1–0 | L |
| 3 | October 9, 1996 | 1–2 | Buffalo Sabres (1996–97) | 1–2–0 | L |
| 4 | October 12, 1996 | 5–3 | St. Louis Blues (1996–97) | 2–2–0 | W |
| 5 | October 14, 1996 | 4–5 OT | Boston Bruins (1996–97) | 2–3–0 | L |
| 6 | October 17, 1996 | 6–1 | @ Dallas Stars (1996–97) | 3–3–0 | W |
| 7 | October 19, 1996 | 2–9 | @ Colorado Avalanche (1996–97) | 3–4–0 | L |
| 8 | October 23, 1996 | 1–4 | Colorado Avalanche (1996–97) | 3–5–0 | L |
| 9 | October 26, 1996 | 2–1 | Pittsburgh Penguins (1996–97) | 4–5–0 | W |
| 10 | October 30, 1996 | 6–3 | @ Mighty Ducks of Anaheim (1996–97) | 5–5–0 | W |

November: 8–5–0 (home: 4–1–0; road: 4–4–0)

| Game | Date | Score | Opponent | Record | Recap |
|---|---|---|---|---|---|
| 11 | November 1, 1996 | 5–4 OT | @ Edmonton Oilers (1996–97) | 6–5–0 | W |
| 12 | November 2, 1996 | 4–3 | Calgary Flames (1996–97) | 7–5–0 | W |
| 13 | November 8, 1996 | 2–4 | St. Louis Blues (1996–97) | 7–6–0 | L |
| 14 | November 11, 1996 | 3–2 | @ New York Rangers (1996–97) | 8–6–0 | W |
| 15 | November 13, 1996 | 4–5 OT | @ New York Islanders (1996–97) | 8–7–0 | L |
| 16 | November 14, 1996 | 3–0 | @ New Jersey Devils (1996–97) | 9–7–0 | W |
| 17 | November 16, 1996 | 1–6 | @ Montreal Canadiens (1996–97) | 9–8–0 | L |
| 18 | November 19, 1996 | 2–0 | Dallas Stars (1996–97) | 10–8–0 | W |
| 19 | November 21, 1996 | 2–1 OT | Chicago Blackhawks (1996–97) | 11–8–0 | W |
| 20 | November 23, 1996 | 5–3 | New York Rangers (1996–97) | 12–8–0 | W |
| 21 | November 26, 1996 | 2–3 | @ Toronto Maple Leafs (1996–97) | 12–9–0 | L |
| 22 | November 27, 1996 | 6–2 | @ Hartford Whalers (1996–97) | 13–9–0 | W |
| 23 | November 29, 1996 | 3–7 | @ Boston Bruins (1996–97) | 13–10–0 | L |

December: 3–9–1 (home: 1–5–0; road: 2–4–1)

| Game | Date | Score | Opponent | Record | Recap |
|---|---|---|---|---|---|
| 24 | December 1, 1996 | 3–4 | @ Philadelphia Flyers (1996–97) | 13–11–0 | L |
| 25 | December 3, 1996 | 2–2 OT | @ Detroit Red Wings (1996–97) | 13–11–1 | T |
| 26 | December 4, 1996 | 7–6 OT | @ Buffalo Sabres (1996–97) | 14–11–1 | W |
| 27 | December 7, 1996 | 2–3 | Ottawa Senators (1996–97) | 14–12–1 | L |
| 28 | December 11, 1996 | 1–6 | Colorado Avalanche (1996–97) | 14–13–1 | L |
| 29 | December 13, 1996 | 1–2 | @ Dallas Stars (1996–97) | 14–14–1 | L |
| 30 | December 15, 1996 | 8–0 | @ St. Louis Blues (1996–97) | 15–14–1 | W |
| 31 | December 18, 1996 | 1–2 | New Jersey Devils (1996–97) | 15–15–1 | L |
| 32 | December 20, 1996 | 3–2 | Detroit Red Wings (1996–97) | 16–15–1 | W |
| 33 | December 23, 1996 | 0–7 | Edmonton Oilers (1996–97) | 16–16–1 | L |
| 34 | December 26, 1996 | 1–6 | @ San Jose Sharks (1996–97) | 16–17–1 | L |
| 35 | December 27, 1996 | 4–7 | @ Phoenix Coyotes (1996–97) | 16–18–1 | L |
| 36 | December 31, 1996 | 3–5 | Philadelphia Flyers (1996–97) | 16–19–1 | L |

January: 8–4–1 (home: 6–1–1; road: 2–3–0)

| Game | Date | Score | Opponent | Record | Recap |
|---|---|---|---|---|---|
| 37 | January 2, 1997 | 4–3 | Los Angeles Kings (1996–97) | 17–19–1 | W |
| 38 | January 4, 1997 | 7–3 | Toronto Maple Leafs (1996–97) | 18–19–1 | W |
| 39 | January 6, 1997 | 5–1 | @ Mighty Ducks of Anaheim (1996–97) | 19–19–1 | W |
| 40 | January 7, 1997 | 2–6 | @ Los Angeles Kings (1996–97) | 19–20–1 | L |
| 41 | January 10, 1997 | 5–3 | Hartford Whalers (1996–97) | 20–20–1 | W |
| 42 | January 12, 1997 | 2–3 | Mighty Ducks of Anaheim (1996–97) | 20–21–1 | L |
| 43 | January 14, 1997 | 4–4 OT | Florida Panthers (1996–97) | 20–21–2 | T |
| 44 | January 20, 1997 | 6–1 | San Jose Sharks (1996–97) | 21–21–2 | W |
| 45 | January 22, 1997 | 4–3 OT | @ Chicago Blackhawks (1996–97) | 22–21–2 | W |
| 46 | January 23, 1997 | 3–4 | @ St. Louis Blues (1996–97) | 22–22–2 | L |
| 47 | January 25, 1997 | 0–4 | @ Phoenix Coyotes (1996–97) | 22–23–2 | L |
| 48 | January 27, 1997 | 5–2 | San Jose Sharks (1996–97) | 23–23–2 | W |
| 49 | January 30, 1997 | 2–1 OT | New York Islanders (1996–97) | 24–23–2 | W |

February: 4–9–0 (home: 2–3–0; road: 2–6–0)

| Game | Date | Score | Opponent | Record | Recap |
|---|---|---|---|---|---|
| 50 | February 1, 1997 | 0–3 | @ Calgary Flames (1996–97) | 24–24–2 | L |
| 51 | February 3, 1997 | 4–6 | @ Ottawa Senators (1996–97) | 24–25–2 | L |
| 52 | February 4, 1997 | 4–6 | @ Pittsburgh Penguins (1996–97) | 24–26–2 | L |
| 53 | February 6, 1997 | 7–4 | @ Detroit Red Wings (1996–97) | 25–26–2 | W |
| 54 | February 8, 1997 | 2–4 | @ Toronto Maple Leafs (1996–97) | 25–27–2 | L |
| 55 | February 11, 1997 | 2–5 | Washington Capitals (1996–97) | 25–28–2 | L |
| 56 | February 15, 1997 | 4–2 | Mighty Ducks of Anaheim (1996–97) | 26–28–2 | W |
| 57 | February 18, 1997 | 5–6 | Toronto Maple Leafs (1996–97) | 26–29–2 | L |
| 58 | February 20, 1997 | 6–1 | @ San Jose Sharks (1996–97) | 27–29–2 | W |
| 59 | February 22, 1997 | 0–4 | @ Los Angeles Kings (1996–97) | 27–30–2 | L |
| 60 | February 23, 1997 | 2–5 | @ Mighty Ducks of Anaheim (1996–97) | 27–31–2 | L |
| 61 | February 25, 1997 | 2–4 | Montreal Canadiens (1996–97) | 27–32–2 | L |
| 62 | February 27, 1997 | 6–2 | Phoenix Coyotes (1996–97) | 28–32–2 | W |

March: 4–8–3 (home: 2–4–2; road: 2–4–1)

| Game | Date | Score | Opponent | Record | Recap |
|---|---|---|---|---|---|
| 63 | March 1, 1997 | 0–3 | Los Angeles Kings (1996–97) | 28–33–2 | L |
| 64 | March 3, 1997 | 1–5 | @ Colorado Avalanche (1996–97) | 28–34–2 | L |
| 65 | March 5, 1997 | 1–1 OT | Chicago Blackhawks (1996–97) | 28–34–3 | T |
| 66 | March 8, 1997 | 3–5 | Detroit Red Wings (1996–97) | 28–35–3 | L |
| 67 | March 10, 1997 | 2–2 OT | @ Chicago Blackhawks (1996–97) | 28–35–4 | T |
| 68 | March 11, 1997 | 1–4 | @ Washington Capitals (1996–97) | 28–36–4 | L |
| 69 | March 13, 1997 | 4–5 | @ Florida Panthers (1996–97) | 28–37–4 | L |
| 70 | March 15, 1997 | 5–2 | @ Tampa Bay Lightning (1996–97) | 29–37–4 | W |
| 71 | March 18, 1997 | 2–4 | @ Colorado Avalanche (1996–97) | 29–38–4 | L |
| 72 | March 20, 1997 | 1–2 | San Jose Sharks (1996–97) | 29–39–4 | L |
| 73 | March 22, 1997 | 3–2 | Tampa Bay Lightning (1996–97) | 30–39–4 | W |
| 74 | March 24, 1997 | 2–2 OT | Los Angeles Kings (1996–97) | 30–39–5 | T |
| 75 | March 26, 1997 | 5–3 | Mighty Ducks of Anaheim (1996–97) | 31–39–5 | W |
| 76 | March 29, 1997 | 5–2 | @ Calgary Flames (1996–97) | 32–39–5 | W |
| 77 | March 30, 1997 | 2–3 | Dallas Stars (1996–97) | 32–40–5 | L |

April: 3–0–2 (home: 2–0–1; road: 1–0–1)

| Game | Date | Score | Opponent | Record | Recap |
|---|---|---|---|---|---|
| 78 | April 4, 1997 | 3–3 OT | Calgary Flames (1996–97) | 32–40–6 | T |
| 79 | April 5, 1997 | 2–2 OT | @ Edmonton Oilers (1996–97) | 32–40–7 | T |
| 80 | April 7, 1997 | 3–2 | @ San Jose Sharks (1996–97) | 33–40–7 | W |
| 81 | April 9, 1997 | 6–4 | Phoenix Coyotes (1996–97) | 34–40–7 | W |
| 82 | April 12, 1997 | 5–4 | Edmonton Oilers (1996–97) | 35–40–7 | W |

Legend: W Win (2 points) L Loss (0 points) T Tie (1 point)

== Player statistics ==
=== Scoring ===
- Position abbreviations: C = Centre; D = Defence; G = Goaltender; LW = Left wing; RW = Right wing
- † = Joined team via a transaction (e.g., trade, waivers, signing) during the season. Stats reflect time with the Canucks only.
- ‡ = Left team via a transaction (e.g., trade, waivers, release) during the season. Stats reflect time with the Canucks only.

| No. | Player | Pos | Regular season | | | | | |
| No. | Player | Pos | GP | G | A | Pts | +/- | PIM |
|---|---|---|---|---|---|---|---|---|
| 89 | Alexander Mogilny | LW | 76 | 31 | 42 | 73 | 9 | 18 |
| 23 | Martin Gelinas | LW | 74 | 35 | 33 | 68 | 6 | 42 |
| 96 | Pavel Bure | RW | 63 | 23 | 32 | 55 | −14 | 40 |
| 17 | Mike Ridley | C | 75 | 20 | 32 | 52 | 0 | 42 |
| 19 | Markus Naslund | LW | 78 | 21 | 20 | 41 | −15 | 30 |
| 16 | Trevor Linden | C | 49 | 9 | 31 | 40 | 5 | 27 |
| 26 | Mike Sillinger | C | 78 | 17 | 20 | 37 | −3 | 25 |
| 21 | Jyrki Lumme | D | 66 | 11 | 24 | 35 | 8 | 32 |
| 9 | Russ Courtnall‡ | RW | 47 | 9 | 19 | 28 | 4 | 24 |
| 10 | Esa Tikkanen‡ | C | 62 | 12 | 15 | 27 | −9 | 66 |
| 7 | David Roberts | LW | 58 | 10 | 17 | 27 | 11 | 51 |
| 44 | Dave Babych | D | 78 | 5 | 22 | 27 | −2 | 38 |
| 14 | Lonny Bohonos | RW | 36 | 11 | 11 | 22 | −3 | 10 |
| 6 | Adrian Aucoin | D | 70 | 5 | 16 | 21 | 0 | 63 |
| 3 | Bret Hedican | D | 67 | 4 | 15 | 19 | −3 | 51 |
| 24 | Scott Walker | RW | 64 | 3 | 15 | 18 | 2 | 132 |
| 32 | Chris Joseph | D | 63 | 3 | 13 | 16 | −21 | 62 |
| 8 (Note: Brashear wore number 28 in his first game.) | Donald Brashear† | LW | 59 | 8 | 5 | 13 | −6 | 207 |
| 29 | Gino Odjick | RW | 70 | 5 | 8 | 13 | −5 | 371 |
| 28 | Brian Noonan† | RW | 16 | 4 | 8 | 12 | 2 | 6 |
| 27 | Leif Rohlin | D | 40 | 2 | 8 | 10 | 4 | 8 |
| 4 | Mark Wotton | D | 36 | 3 | 6 | 9 | 8 | 19 |
| 5 | Dana Murzyn | D | 61 | 1 | 7 | 8 | 7 | 118 |
| 25 | Steve Staios† | D | 9 | 0 | 6 | 6 | 2 | 20 |
| 13 | Sergei Nemchinov† | C | 6 | 2 | 3 | 5 | 4 | 4 |
| 20 | Alexander Semak | C | 18 | 2 | 1 | 3 | −2 | 2 |
| 18 | Troy Crowder | RW | 30 | 1 | 2 | 3 | −6 | 52 |
| 22 | Larry Courville | LW | 19 | 0 | 2 | 2 | −4 | 11 |
| 1 | Kirk McLean | G | 44 | 0 | 2 | 2 | | 2 |
| 31 | Corey Hirsch | G | 39 | 0 | 1 | 1 | | 6 |
| 34 | Jassen Cullimore‡ | D | 3 | 0 | 0 | 0 | −2 | 2 |
| 30 | Mike Fountain | G | 6 | 0 | 0 | 0 | | 0 |
| 2 | Frantisek Kucera‡ | D | 2 | 0 | 0 | 0 | 0 | 0 |
| 2 | Evgeny Namestnikov | D | 2 | 0 | 0 | 0 | −1 | 4 |

=== Goaltending ===
| No. | Player | Regular season | | | | | | | | | |
| No. | Player | GP | W | L | T | SA | GA | GAA | SV% | SO | TOI |
|---|---|---|---|---|---|---|---|---|---|---|---|
| 1 | Kirk McLean | 44 | 21 | 18 | 3 | 1247 | 138 | 3.21 | .889 | 0 | 2581 |
| 31 | Corey Hirsch | 39 | 12 | 20 | 4 | 1090 | 116 | 3.27 | .894 | 2 | 2127 |
| 30 | Mike Fountain | 6 | 2 | 2 | 0 | 135 | 14 | 3.43 | .896 | 1 | 245 |

== Awards and records ==
=== Awards ===
| Type | Award/honour | Recipient | Ref |
|---|---|---|---|
| League (annual) | King Clancy Memorial Trophy | Trevor Linden | |
| League (in-season) | NHL All-Star Game selection | Pavel Bure | |
| Team | Babe Pratt Trophy | Jyrki Lumme | |
| Team | Cyclone Taylor Trophy | Martin Gelinas | |
| Team | Cyrus H. McLean Trophy | Alexander Mogilny | |
| Team | Fred J. Hume Award | Mike Sillinger | |
| Team | Molson Cup | Martin Gelinas | |
| Team | Most Exciting Player Award | Martin Gelinas | |

=== Milestones ===
| Milestone | Player | Date | Ref |
|---|---|---|---|
| First game | Mike Fountain | November 14, 1996 | |

== Draft picks ==
Vancouver's draft picks at the 1996 NHL entry draft held at the Kiel Center in St. Louis, Missouri.

| Round | # | Player | Nationality | College/Junior/Club team (League) |
|---|---|---|---|---|
| 1 | 12 | Josh Holden | Canada | Regina Pats (WHL) |
| 3 | 75 | Zenith Komarniski | Canada | Tri-City Americans (WHL) |
| 4 | 93 | Jonas Soling | Sweden | Huddinge IK (Sweden) |
| 5 | 121 | Tyler Prosofsky | Canada | Kelowna Rockets (WHL) |
| 6 | 147 | Nolan McDonald | Canada | University of Vermont (Hockey East) |
| 7 | 175 | Clint Cabana | Canada | Medicine Hat Tigers (WHL) |
| 8 | 201 | Jeff Scissons | Canada | Vernon Vipers (BCJHL) |
| 9 | 227 | Lubomir Vaic | Slovakia | HC Kosice (Slovakia) |

== See also ==
- 1996–97 NHL season
