= 1996–97 Chicago Blackhawks season =

National Hockey League team season

1996–97 Chicago Blackhawks
- Division: 5th Central
- Conference: 8th Western
- 1996–97 record: 34–35–13
- Home record: 16–21–4
- Road record: 18–14–9
- Goals for: 223
- Goals against: 210

Team information
- General manager: Bob Pulford
- Coach: Craig Hartsburg
- Captain: Chris Chelios
- Arena: United Center
- Average attendance: 19,396
- Minor league affiliates: Indianapolis Ice; Columbus Chill

Team leaders
- Goals: Tony Amonte (41)
- Assists: Alexei Zhamnov (42)
- Points: Tony Amonte (77)
- Penalty minutes: Bob Probert (326)
- Plus/minus: Tony Amonte (+35)
- Wins: Jeff Hackett (19)
- Goals against average: Jeff Hackett (2.16)

The 1996–97 Chicago Blackhawks season was the 71st season of operation of the Chicago Blackhawks in the National Hockey League (NHL).

== Regular season ==
=== Final standings ===
Central Division
| No. | CR | | GP | W | L | T | GF | GA | Pts |
|---|---|---|---|---|---|---|---|---|---|
| 1 | 2 | **Dallas Stars** | 82 | 48 | 26 | 8 | 252 | 198 | 104 |
| 2 | 3 | **Detroit Red Wings** | 82 | 38 | 26 | 18 | 253 | 197 | 94 |
| 3 | 5 | **Phoenix Coyotes** | 82 | 38 | 37 | 7 | 240 | 243 | 83 |
| 4 | 6 | **St. Louis Blues** | 82 | 36 | 35 | 11 | 236 | 239 | 83 |
| 5 | 8 | **Chicago Blackhawks** | 82 | 34 | 35 | 13 | 223 | 210 | 81 |
| 6 | 11 | Toronto Maple Leafs | 82 | 30 | 44 | 8 | 230 | 273 | 68 |

Note: CR = Conference rank; GP = Games played; W = Wins; L = Losses; T = Ties; GF = Goals for; GA = Goals against; Pts = Points
Bolded teams qualified for the playoffs.

Western Conference
| R | | Div | GP | W | L | T | GF | GA | Pts |
|---|---|---|---|---|---|---|---|---|---|
| **1** | **p – Colorado Avalanche** | **PAC** | **82** | **49** | **24** | **9** | **277** | **205** | **107** |
| **2** | **Dallas Stars** | **CEN** | **82** | **48** | **26** | **8** | **252** | **198** | **104** |
| **3** | **Detroit Red Wings** | **CEN** | **82** | **38** | **26** | **18** | **253** | **197** | **94** |
| **4** | **Mighty Ducks of Anaheim** | **PAC** | **82** | **36** | **33** | **13** | **245** | **233** | **85** |
| **5** | **Phoenix Coyotes** | **CEN** | **82** | **38** | **37** | **7** | **240** | **243** | **83** |
| **6** | **St. Louis Blues** | **CEN** | **82** | **36** | **35** | **11** | **236** | **239** | **83** |
| **7** | **Edmonton Oilers** | **PAC** | **82** | **36** | **37** | **9** | **252** | **247** | **81** |
| **8** | **Chicago Blackhawks** | **CEN** | **82** | **34** | **35** | **13** | **223** | **210** | **81** |
| 9 | Vancouver Canucks | PAC | 82 | 35 | 40 | 7 | 257 | 273 | 77 |
| 10 | Calgary Flames | PAC | 82 | 32 | 41 | 9 | 214 | 239 | 73 |
| 11 | Toronto Maple Leafs | CEN | 82 | 30 | 44 | 8 | 230 | 273 | 68 |
| 12 | Los Angeles Kings | PAC | 82 | 28 | 43 | 11 | 214 | 268 | 67 |
| 13 | San Jose Sharks | PAC | 82 | 27 | 47 | 8 | 211 | 278 | 62 |

Divisions: CEN – Central, PAC – Pacific

bold – Qualified for playoffs; p – Won Presidents' Trophy

== Playoffs ==
- April 24, 1997: Patrick Roy of the Colorado Avalanche shut out Chicago by a score of 7–0. He earned his 89th postseason victory and became the goalie with the most postseason wins, surpassing the old record set by New York Islanders goalie Billy Smith.

== Schedule and results ==
=== Regular season ===
1996–97 regular season
October: 6–5–2 (home: 3–4–0; road: 3–1–2)

| Game | Date | Score | Opponent | Record | Recap |
|---|---|---|---|---|---|
| 1 | October 5, 1996 | 5–2 | @ Washington Capitals (1996–97) | 1–0–0 | W |
| 2 | October 6, 1996 | 4–1 | @ St. Louis Blues (1996–97) | 2–0–0 | W |
| 3 | October 9, 1996 | 0–2 | Mighty Ducks of Anaheim (1996–97) | 2–1–0 | L |
| 4 | October 11, 1996 | 0–2 | Colorado Avalanche (1996–97) | 2–2–0 | L |
| 5 | October 13, 1996 | 3–5 | Dallas Stars (1996–97) | 2–3–0 | L |
| 6 | October 15, 1996 | 3–1 | @ Toronto Maple Leafs (1996–97) | 3–3–0 | W |
| 7 | October 17, 1996 | 2–1 | Detroit Red Wings (1996–97) | 4–3–0 | W |
| 8 | October 20, 1996 | 2–1 | Los Angeles Kings (1996–97) | 5–3–0 | W |
| 9 | October 24, 1996 | 6–4 | St. Louis Blues (1996–97) | 6–3–0 | W |
| 10 | October 25, 1996 | 2–2 OT | @ Detroit Red Wings (1996–97) | 6–3–1 | T |
| 11 | October 27, 1996 | 2–6 | San Jose Sharks (1996–97) | 6–4–1 | L |
| 12 | October 29, 1996 | 2–2 OT | @ Tampa Bay Lightning (1996–97) | 6–4–2 | T |
| 13 | October 30, 1996 | 2–3 | @ Florida Panthers (1996–97) | 6–5–2 | L |

November: 6–7–1 (home: 2–3–0; road: 4–4–1)

| Game | Date | Score | Opponent | Record | Recap |
|---|---|---|---|---|---|
| 14 | November 1, 1996 | 3–2 OT | @ Dallas Stars (1996–97) | 7–5–2 | W |
| 15 | November 3, 1996 | 4–2 | Edmonton Oilers (1996–97) | 8–5–2 | W |
| 16 | November 7, 1996 | 2–4 | New Jersey Devils (1996–97) | 8–6–2 | L |
| 17 | November 9, 1996 | 4–1 | @ Philadelphia Flyers (1996–97) | 9–6–2 | W |
| 18 | November 10, 1996 | 2–0 | Ottawa Senators (1996–97) | 10–6–2 | W |
| 19 | November 14, 1996 | 1–2 OT | Calgary Flames (1996–97) | 10–7–2 | L |
| 20 | November 15, 1996 | 3–4 | @ Ottawa Senators (1996–97) | 10–8–2 | L |
| 21 | November 17, 1996 | 2–4 | Los Angeles Kings (1996–97) | 10–9–2 | L |
| 22 | November 19, 1996 | 4–4 OT | @ Edmonton Oilers (1996–97) | 10–9–3 | T |
| 23 | November 21, 1996 | 1–2 OT | @ Vancouver Canucks (1996–97) | 10–10–3 | L |
| 24 | November 22, 1996 | 5–2 | @ Calgary Flames (1996–97) | 11–10–3 | W |
| 25 | November 27, 1996 | 2–3 | @ San Jose Sharks (1996–97) | 11–11–3 | L |
| 26 | November 29, 1996 | 0–2 | @ Mighty Ducks of Anaheim (1996–97) | 11–12–3 | L |
| 27 | November 30, 1996 | 5–3 | @ Los Angeles Kings (1996–97) | 12–12–3 | W |

December: 3–8–3 (home: 2–5–2; road: 1–3–1)

| Game | Date | Score | Opponent | Record | Recap |
|---|---|---|---|---|---|
| 28 | December 6, 1996 | 1–3 | Montreal Canadiens (1996–97) | 12–13–3 | L |
| 29 | December 7, 1996 | 2–3 | @ Montreal Canadiens (1996–97) | 12–14–3 | L |
| 30 | December 9, 1996 | 1–3 | Toronto Maple Leafs (1996–97) | 12–15–3 | L |
| 31 | December 12, 1996 | 2–6 | @ Detroit Red Wings (1996–97) | 12–16–3 | L |
| 32 | December 13, 1996 | 4–1 | @ St. Louis Blues (1996–97) | 13–16–3 | W |
| 33 | December 15, 1996 | 2–1 | Pittsburgh Penguins (1996–97) | 14–16–3 | W |
| 34 | December 18, 1996 | 2–3 OT | Dallas Stars (1996–97) | 14–17–3 | L |
| 35 | December 20, 1996 | 1–3 | Florida Panthers (1996–97) | 14–18–3 | L |
| 36 | December 22, 1996 | 2–2 OT | Philadelphia Flyers (1996–97) | 14–18–4 | T |
| 37 | December 23, 1996 | 3–3 OT | @ Boston Bruins (1996–97) | 14–18–5 | T |
| 38 | December 26, 1996 | 4–4 OT | St. Louis Blues (1996–97) | 14–18–6 | T |
| 39 | December 28, 1996 | 4–5 | @ Toronto Maple Leafs (1996–97) | 14–19–6 | L |
| 40 | December 29, 1996 | 4–3 | Hartford Whalers (1996–97) | 15–19–6 | W |
| 41 | December 31, 1996 | 1–4 | Colorado Avalanche (1996–97) | 15–20–6 | L |

January: 3–6–2 (home: 1–4–1; road: 2–2–1)

| Game | Date | Score | Opponent | Record | Recap |
|---|---|---|---|---|---|
| 42 | January 2, 1997 | 2–4 | Phoenix Coyotes (1996–97) | 15–21–6 | L |
| 43 | January 5, 1997 | 5–5 OT | Detroit Red Wings (1996–97) | 15–21–7 | T |
| 44 | January 8, 1997 | 4–1 | Edmonton Oilers (1996–97) | 16–21–7 | W |
| 45 | January 10, 1997 | 3–3 OT | @ New Jersey Devils (1996–97) | 16–21–8 | T |
| 46 | January 11, 1997 | 3–1 | @ Detroit Red Wings (1996–97) | 17–21–8 | W |
| 47 | January 13, 1997 | 0–2 | Tampa Bay Lightning (1996–97) | 17–22–8 | L |
| 48 | January 20, 1997 | 1–2 | @ Buffalo Sabres (1996–97) | 17–23–8 | L |
| 49 | January 22, 1997 | 3–4 OT | Vancouver Canucks (1996–97) | 17–24–8 | L |
| 50 | January 24, 1997 | 1–2 OT | Toronto Maple Leafs (1996–97) | 17–25–8 | L |
| 51 | January 25, 1997 | 2–3 | @ New York Islanders (1996–97) | 17–26–8 | L |
| 52 | January 27, 1997 | 2–1 | @ New York Rangers (1996–97) | 18–26–8 | W |

February: 7–3–1 (home: 3–1–0; road: 4–2–1)

| Game | Date | Score | Opponent | Record | Recap |
|---|---|---|---|---|---|
| 53 | February 1, 1997 | 3–2 | @ Los Angeles Kings (1996–97) | 19–26–8 | W |
| 54 | February 3, 1997 | 4–2 | @ San Jose Sharks (1996–97) | 20–26–8 | W |
| 55 | February 6, 1997 | 2–3 | @ Phoenix Coyotes (1996–97) | 20–27–8 | L |
| 56 | February 8, 1997 | 4–2 | @ Colorado Avalanche (1996–97) | 21–27–8 | W |
| 57 | February 13, 1997 | 7–3 | San Jose Sharks (1996–97) | 22–27–8 | W |
| 58 | February 15, 1997 | 2–0 | New York Rangers (1996–97) | 23–27–8 | W |
| 59 | February 17, 1997 | 2–4 | @ St. Louis Blues (1996–97) | 23–28–8 | L |
| 60 | February 20, 1997 | 5–3 | Boston Bruins (1996–97) | 24–28–8 | W |
| 61 | February 22, 1997 | 5–2 | @ Pittsburgh Penguins (1996–97) | 25–28–8 | W |
| 62 | February 25, 1997 | 0–1 | Dallas Stars (1996–97) | 25–29–8 | L |
| 63 | February 26, 1997 | 2–2 OT | @ Hartford Whalers (1996–97) | 25–29–9 | T |

March: 6–4–3 (home: 4–3–1; road: 2–1–2)

| Game | Date | Score | Opponent | Record | Recap |
|---|---|---|---|---|---|
| 64 | March 1, 1997 | 1–2 | @ Colorado Avalanche (1996–97) | 25–30–9 | L |
| 65 | March 2, 1997 | 4–0 | @ Phoenix Coyotes (1996–97) | 26–30–9 | W |
| 66 | March 5, 1997 | 1–1 OT | @ Vancouver Canucks (1996–97) | 26–30–10 | T |
| 67 | March 8, 1997 | 0–2 | Phoenix Coyotes (1996–97) | 26–31–10 | L |
| 68 | March 10, 1997 | 2–2 OT | Vancouver Canucks (1996–97) | 26–31–11 | T |
| 69 | March 12, 1997 | 3–2 | @ Toronto Maple Leafs (1996–97) | 27–31–11 | W |
| 70 | March 14, 1997 | 4–4 OT | @ Dallas Stars (1996–97) | 27–31–12 | T |
| 71 | March 16, 1997 | 5–4 | New York Islanders (1996–97) | 28–31–12 | W |
| 72 | March 20, 1997 | 2–4 | Phoenix Coyotes (1996–97) | 28–32–12 | L |
| 73 | March 23, 1997 | 5–3 | Detroit Red Wings (1996–97) | 29–32–12 | W |
| 74 | March 26, 1997 | 5–3 | Washington Capitals (1996–97) | 30–32–12 | W |
| 75 | March 28, 1997 | 3–4 | Mighty Ducks of Anaheim (1996–97) | 30–33–12 | L |
| 76 | March 30, 1997 | 3–2 | Buffalo Sabres (1996–97) | 31–33–12 | W |

April: 3–2–1 (home: 1–1–0; road: 2–1–1)

| Game | Date | Score | Opponent | Record | Recap |
|---|---|---|---|---|---|
| 77 | April 1, 1997 | 3–3 OT | @ Mighty Ducks of Anaheim (1996–97) | 31–33–13 | T |
| 78 | April 3, 1997 | 2–4 | @ Edmonton Oilers (1996–97) | 31–34–13 | L |
| 79 | April 6, 1997 | 2–1 | @ Calgary Flames (1996–97) | 32–34–13 | W |
| 80 | April 9, 1997 | 0–1 | St. Louis Blues (1996–97) | 32–35–13 | L |
| 81 | April 11, 1997 | 7–3 | Calgary Flames (1996–97) | 33–35–13 | W |
| 82 | April 13, 1997 | 5–2 | @ Dallas Stars (1996–97) | 34–35–13 | W |

Legend: W Win (2 points) L Loss (0 points) T Tie (1 point)

=== Playoffs ===
1997 Stanley Cup playoffs
Western Conference Quarterfinals vs. (1) Colorado Avalanche – Avalanche win 4–2

| Game | Date | Score | Opponent | Series | Recap |
|---|---|---|---|---|---|
| 1 | April 16, 1997 | 0–6 | @ Colorado Avalanche | Avalanche lead 1–0 | L |
| 2 | April 18, 1997 | 1–3 | @ Colorado Avalanche | Avalanche lead 2–0 | L |
| 3 | April 20, 1997 | 4–3 2OT | Colorado Avalanche | Avalanche lead 2–1 | W |
| 4 | April 22, 1997 | 6–3 | Colorado Avalanche | Series tied 2–2 | W |
| 5 | April 24, 1997 | 0–7 | @ Colorado Avalanche | Avalanche lead 3–2 | L |
| 6 | April 26, 1997 | 3–6 | Colorado Avalanche | Avalanche win 4–2 | L |

Legend: W Win L Loss

== Player statistics ==
=== Scoring ===
- Position abbreviations: C = Center; D = Defense; G = Goaltender; LW = Left wing; RW = Right wing
- † = Joined team via a transaction (e.g., trade, waivers, signing) during the season. Stats reflect time with the Blackhawks only.
- ‡ = Left team via a transaction (e.g., trade, waivers, release) during the season. Stats reflect time with the Blackhawks only.

| No. | Player | Pos | Regular season | | | | | | Playoffs | | | | | |
| No. | Player | Pos | GP | G | A | Pts | +/- | PIM | GP | G | A | Pts | +/- | PIM |
|---|---|---|---|---|---|---|---|---|---|---|---|---|---|---|
| 10 | Tony Amonte | RW | 81 | 41 | 36 | 77 | 35 | 64 | 6 | 4 | 2 | 6 | 2 | 8 |
| 26 | Alexei Zhamnov | C | 74 | 20 | 42 | 62 | 18 | 56 | — | — | — | — | — | — |
| 7 | Chris Chelios | D | 72 | 10 | 38 | 48 | 16 | 112 | 6 | 0 | 1 | 1 | −2 | 8 |
| 55 | Eric Daze | RW | 71 | 22 | 19 | 41 | −4 | 16 | 6 | 2 | 1 | 3 | −1 | 2 |
| 32 | Murray Craven | C | 75 | 8 | 27 | 35 | 0 | 12 | 2 | 0 | 0 | 0 | −4 | 2 |
| 2 | Eric Weinrich | D | 81 | 7 | 25 | 32 | 19 | 62 | 6 | 0 | 1 | 1 | −1 | 4 |
| 19 (Note: Moreau wore number 17 in his first two games.) | Ethan Moreau | LW | 82 | 15 | 16 | 31 | 13 | 123 | 6 | 1 | 0 | 1 | 3 | 9 |
| 16 | Kevin Miller | RW | 69 | 14 | 17 | 31 | −10 | 41 | 6 | 0 | 1 | 1 | 0 | 0 |
| 11 | Jeff Shantz | C | 69 | 9 | 21 | 30 | 11 | 28 | 6 | 0 | 4 | 4 | 4 | 6 |
| 20 | Gary Suter | D | 82 | 7 | 21 | 28 | −4 | 70 | 6 | 1 | 4 | 5 | 1 | 8 |
| 18 | Denis Savard | C | 64 | 9 | 18 | 27 | −10 | 60 | 6 | 0 | 2 | 2 | −3 | 2 |
| 25 | Sergei Krivokrasov | LW | 67 | 13 | 11 | 24 | −1 | 42 | 6 | 1 | 0 | 1 | −2 | 4 |
| 38 | James Black | LW | 64 | 12 | 11 | 23 | 6 | 20 | 5 | 1 | 1 | 2 | 1 | 2 |
| 24 | Bob Probert | LW | 82 | 9 | 14 | 23 | −3 | 326 | 6 | 2 | 1 | 3 | −4 | 41 |
| 4 | Keith Carney | D | 81 | 3 | 15 | 18 | 26 | 62 | 6 | 1 | 1 | 2 | −2 | 2 |
| 12 | Brent Sutter | C | 39 | 7 | 7 | 14 | 10 | 18 | 2 | 0 | 0 | 0 | −2 | 6 |
| 22 | Ulf Dahlen† | LW | 30 | 6 | 8 | 14 | 9 | 10 | 5 | 0 | 1 | 1 | 0 | 0 |
| 15 | Jim Cummins | RW | 65 | 6 | 6 | 12 | 4 | 199 | 6 | 0 | 0 | 0 | −5 | 24 |
| 6 | Michal Sykora† | D | 28 | 1 | 9 | 10 | 4 | 10 | 1 | 0 | 0 | 0 | −2 | 0 |
| 39 | Enrico Ciccone | D | 67 | 2 | 2 | 4 | −1 | 233 | 4 | 0 | 0 | 0 | 0 | 18 |
| 22 | Adam Creighton† | C | 19 | 1 | 2 | 3 | −2 | 13 | — | — | — | — | — | — |
| 8 | Cam Russell | D | 44 | 1 | 1 | 2 | −8 | 65 | 4 | 0 | 0 | 0 | 0 | 4 |
| 46 | Tuomas Gronman | D | 16 | 0 | 1 | 1 | −4 | 13 | — | — | — | — | — | — |
| 31 | Jeff Hackett | G | 41 | 0 | 1 | 1 | | 6 | 6 | 0 | 0 | 0 | | 0 |
| 44 | Christian Laflamme | D | 4 | 0 | 1 | 1 | 3 | 2 | — | — | — | — | — | — |
| 37 | Jean-Yves Leroux | LW | 1 | 0 | 1 | 1 | 1 | 5 | — | — | — | — | — | — |
| 30 | Ed Belfour‡ | G | 33 | 0 | 0 | 0 | | 26 | — | — | — | — | — | — |
| 54 | Dave Chyzowski | LW | 8 | 0 | 0 | 0 | 1 | 6 | — | — | — | — | — | — |
| 14 | Steve Dubinsky | C | 5 | 0 | 0 | 0 | 2 | 0 | 4 | 1 | 0 | 1 | 0 | 4 |
| 17 | Sergei Klimovich | C | 1 | 0 | 0 | 0 | 0 | 2 | — | — | — | — | — | — |
| 17 | Basil McRae†‡ | LW | 8 | 0 | 0 | 0 | −2 | 12 | — | — | — | — | — | — |
| 23 | Mike Prokopec‡ | RW | 6 | 0 | 0 | 0 | −1 | 6 | — | — | — | — | — | — |
| 5 | Steve Smith | D | 21 | 0 | 0 | 0 | 4 | 29 | 3 | 0 | 0 | 0 | 0 | 4 |
| 40 | Chris Terreri† | G | 7 | 0 | 0 | 0 | | 0 | 2 | 0 | 0 | 0 | | 2 |
| 29 | Jimmy Waite | G | 2 | 0 | 0 | 0 | | 0 | — | — | — | — | — | — |

=== Goaltending ===
| No. | Player | Regular season | | | | | | | | | | Playoffs | | | | | | | | |
| No. | Player | GP | W | L | T | SA | GA | GAA | SV% | SO | TOI | GP | W | L | SA | GA | GAA | SV% | SO | TOI |
|---|---|---|---|---|---|---|---|---|---|---|---|---|---|---|---|---|---|---|---|---|
| 31 | Jeff Hackett | 41 | 19 | 18 | 4 | 1212 | 89 | 2.16 | .927 | 2 | 2473 | 6 | 2 | 4 | 190 | 25 | 4.34 | .868 | 0 | 345 |
| 30 | Ed Belfour‡ | 33 | 11 | 15 | 6 | 946 | 88 | 2.69 | .907 | 1 | 1966 | — | — | — | — | — | — | — | — | — |
| 40 | Chris Terreri† | 7 | 4 | 1 | 2 | 192 | 19 | 2.66 | .901 | 0 | 429 | 2 | 0 | 0 | 28 | 3 | 4.11 | .893 | 0 | 44 |
| 29 | Jimmy Waite | 2 | 0 | 1 | 1 | 58 | 7 | 4.00 | .879 | 0 | 105 | — | — | — | — | — | — | — | — | — |

== Awards and records ==
=== Awards ===
| Type | Award/honor | Recipient | Ref |
|---|---|---|---|
| League (annual) | NHL Second All-Star Team | Chris Chelios (Defense) | |
| League (in-season) | NHL All-Star Game selection | Tony Amonte | |
| League (in-season) | NHL All-Star Game selection | Chris Chelios (Note: Chelios was voted to the starting lineup, earning more votes than any other player.) | |

=== Milestones ===
| Milestone | Player | Date | Ref |
|---|---|---|---|
| First game | Tuomas Gronman | October 5, 1996 | |
| First game | Sergei Klimovich | December 9, 1996 | |
| First game | Christian Laflamme | March 12, 1997 | |
| First game | Jean-Yves Leroux | April 13, 1997 | |

== Draft picks ==
Chicago's draft picks at the 1996 NHL entry draft held at the Kiel Center in St. Louis, Missouri.

| Round | # | Player | Nationality | College/Junior/Club team (League) |
|---|---|---|---|---|
| 2 | 31 | Remi Royer | Canada | Saint-Hyacinthe Laser (QMJHL) |
| 2 | 42 | Jeff Paul | Canada | Niagara Falls Thunder (OHL) |
| 2 | 46 | Geoff Peters | Canada | Niagara Falls Thunder (OHL) |
| 5 | 130 | Andy Johnson | Canada | Peterborough Petes (OHL) |
| 7 | 184 | Mike Vellinga | Canada | Guelph Storm (OHL) |
| 8 | 210 | Chris Twerdun | Canada | Moose Jaw Warriors (WHL) |
| 9 | 236 | Andrei Kozyrev | Russia | Severstal Cherepovets (Russia) |

== See also ==
- 1996–97 NHL season
