= Nicholas Vachon =

Canadian former ice hockey player (born 1972)

- Born: July 20, 1972 (age 54) Montreal, Quebec, Canada
- Height: 5 ft 10 in (178 cm)
- Weight: 185 lb (84 kg; 13 st 3 lb)
- Position: Left wing
- Shot: Left
- Played for: New York Islanders
- NHL draft: 241st overall, 1990; Toronto Maple Leafs
- Playing career: 1993–1998

Nicholas "Nick" Vachon (born July 20, 1972) is a Canadian former ice hockey player.

== Biography ==
Born in Montreal, Quebec, Vachon is the son of former NHL goaltender Rogie Vachon.

As a youth, Vachon played in the 1984 Quebec International Pee-Wee Hockey Tournament with a minor ice hockey team from Los Angeles.

He was drafted in the 12th round, 241st overall in 1990 by the Toronto Maple Leafs. In his career, he played one National Hockey League game for the New York Islanders in 1996. He also played the title character in George Plamondon's 2003 short film Clark: The Canadian Hockey Goalie.

== Career statistics ==
			Regular season					Playoffs
Season	Team	League	GP	G	A	Pts	PIM	GP	G	A	Pts	PIM
1990–91	Boston University	NCAA	8	0	1	1	4	—	—	—	—	—
1991–92	Boston University	NCAA	16	6	7	13	10	—	—	—	—	—
1991–92	Portland Winterhawks	WHL	25	9	19	28	46	6	0	3	3	14
1992–93	Portland Winterhawks	WHL	66	33	58	91	100	16	11	7	18	34
1993–94	Atlanta Knights	IHL	3	1	1	2	0	—	—	—	—	—
1993–94	Knoxville Cherokees	ECHL	61	29	57	86	139	3	0	0	0	2
1994–95	Phoenix Roadrunners	IHL	64	13	26	39	137	9	1	2	3	24
1995–96	Phoenix Roadrunners	IHL	73	13	17	30	168	1	0	0	0	2
1996–97	New York Islanders	NHL	1	0	0	0	0	—	—	—	—	—
1996–97	Phoenix Roadrunners	IHL	16	3	3	6	18	—	—	—	—	—
1996–97	Utah Grizzlies	IHL	33	3	5	8	110	—	—	—	—	—
1996–97	Long Beach Ice Dogs	IHL	13	1	2	3	42	18	1	2	3	43
1997–98	Springfield Falcons	AHL	7	0	0	0	16	—	—	—	—	—
1997–98	Long Beach Ice Dogs	IHL	56	3	6	9	113	—	—	—	—	—
NHL totals			1	0	0	0	0	—	—	—	—	—

== See also ==
- List of players who played only one game in the NHL
