= Marc LaBelle =

Canadian ice hockey player

- Born: December 20, 1969 (age 55); Maniwaki, Quebec, Canada
- Height: 6 ft 2 in (188 cm)
- Weight: 215 lb (98 kg; 15 st 5 lb)
- Position: Left wing
- Shot: Left
- Played for: Dallas Stars
- NHL draft: Undrafted
- Playing career: 1990–2000

Marc LaBelle (born December 20, 1969) is a Canadian former professional ice hockey player. He played 9 games in the National Hockey League with the Dallas Stars during the 1996–97 season. The rest of his career, which lasted from 1990 to 2000, was spent in the minor leagues.

== Career ==
LaBelle went undrafted and signed with the Montreal Canadiens in 1991 as a free agent, but played in the minors. He then signed with the Ottawa Senators the next year, again as a free agent, but only played in the minor leagues. LaBelle was then claimed by the Florida Panthers in the 1993 NHL Expansion Draft, spending three seasons in the International Hockey League with the Cincinnati Cyclones and the Milwaukee Admirals, but never played for the Panthers.

He signed with the Dallas Stars in 1996 and played nine regular season games during the 1996–97 season, scoring no points and collecting 46 penalty minutes. He continued to play in the IHL with the Admirals, Cyclones, and Michigan K-Wings. He also played one game in the Quebec Semi-Pro Hockey League for the Lachute Rapids. LaBelle joined the El Paso Buzzards as a player and associate coach, where he spent two seasons, but suffered a hand injury during a game against the New Mexico Scorpions, which eventually led to his retirement. He briefly came out of retirement during the 2006–07 ECHL season playing one more game for the Cincinnati Cyclones.

== Career statistics ==
=== Regular season and playoffs ===
			Regular season					Playoffs
Season	Team	League	GP	G	A	Pts	PIM	GP	G	A	Pts	PIM
1986–87	Hull Olympiques	QMJHL	58	1	4	5	91	7	0	2	2	12
1987–88	Hull Olympiques	QMJHL	11	2	1	3	23	—	—	—	—	—
1987–88	Victoriaville Tigres	QMJHL	52	9	13	22	212	5	2	4	6	20
1988–89	Victoriaville Tigres	QMJHL	62	9	26	35	202	15	6	3	9	30
1989–90	Victoriaville Tigres	QMJHL	56	18	21	39	192	16	4	8	12	42
1990–91	Fredericton Canadiens	AHL	25	1	4	5	95	4	0	2	2	25
1990–91	Richmond Renegades	ECHL	5	1	1	2	37	—	—	—	—	—
1991–92	Fredericton Canadiens	AHL	62	7	10	17	238	3	0	0	0	6
1992–93	San Diego Gulls	IHL	5	0	2	2	5	—	—	—	—	—
1992–93	New Haven Senators	AHL	31	5	4	9	124	—	—	—	—	—
1992–93	Thunder Bay Thunder Hawks	CoHL	9	0	5	5	17	7	0	1	1	11
1993–94	Cincinnati Cyclones	IHL	37	2	1	3	133	4	0	1	1	6
1994–95	Cincinnati Cyclones	IHL	54	3	4	7	173	8	0	0	0	7
1995–96	Cincinnati Cyclones	IHL	57	6	11	17	218	—	—	—	—	—
1995–96	Milwaukee Admirals	IHL	20	5	3	8	50	5	1	1	2	4
1996–97	Dallas Stars	NHL	9	0	0	0	46	—	—	—	—	—
1996–97	Milwaukee Admirals	IHL	14	1	1	2	33	—	—	—	—	—
1996–97	Michigan K-Wings	IHL	46	4	7	11	148	3	0	0	0	6
1997–98	Rapides de Lachute	QSPHL	1	0	0	0	0	—	—	—	—	—
1997–98	Cincinnati Cyclones	IHL	60	2	1	3	160	9	0	1	1	38
1998–99	El Paso Buzzards	WPHL	47	11	25	36	182	3	1	0	1	0
1999–00	El Paso Buzzards	WPHL	39	0	9	9	186	2	0	0	0	7
IHL totals			239	39	65	104	720	43	12	17	29	104
NHL totals			9	0	0	0	46	—	—	—	—	—
