= 1997 National Hockey League All-Star Game =

Professional ice hockey exhibition game

1997 NHL All-Star Game
	1	2	3	Total
East	4	6	1	11
West	2	4	1	7
- Date: January 18, 1997
- Arena: San Jose Arena
- City: San Jose
- MVP: Mark Recchi (Montreal)
- Attendance: 17,422

The 1997 National Hockey League All-Star Game took place on January 18, 1997, at San Jose Arena in San Jose, home of the San Jose Sharks. The final score was Eastern Conference 11, Western Conference 7. This game was originally scheduled for the 1994–95 season, but was cancelled due to the 1994–95 NHL lockout.

== Super Skills Competition ==
The Eastern Conference won the skills competition for the first time since 1992. St. Louis Blues' Al MacInnis won the Hardest Shot event for the third time in his career by slapping the puck at 98.9 mph. Boston Bruins' defenceman Ray Bourque won the Shooting Accuracy event for the fourth time, hitting four targets in seven shots. Florida Panthers' goaltender John Vanbiesbrouck stopped all 10 shots by Mats Sundin and Derian Hatcher in Rapid-Fire Relay to outduel Colorado Avalanche netminder Patrick Roy who made nine saves. In the Power-Play Relay, Vanbiesbrouck allowed only two of six shots to elude him that were taken by Mighty Ducks of Anaheims' Teemu Selanne and Paul Kariya to claim the Goaltenders Competition.

=== Individual event winners ===
- Puck Control Relay - Geoff Sanderson (Hartford Whalers)
- Fastest Skater - Peter Bondra, (Washington Capitals) - 13.610 seconds
- Accuracy Shooting - Ray Bourque, (Boston Bruins) - 4 hits, 7 shots
- Hardest Shot - Al MacInnis, (St. Louis Blues) - 98.9 mph
- Goaltenders Competition - John Vanbiesbrouck, (Florida Panthers) - 2 GA, 16 shots

== The Game ==
Montreal Canadiens' right-winger Mark Recchi had a hat-trick to lead the Eastern Conference to an 11–7 victory and to be named All-Star M.V.P. Mark Recchi would become the fourth Montreal Canadien to receive the award. A record 10 goals was scored in the second period, including two from hometown favorite San Jose Sharks' right-winger Owen Nolan in a record eight seconds. Nolan would complete his hat-trick in the third period as he closed in on a breakaway towards Buffalo Sabres' goaltender Dominik Hasek. Nolan pointed to the top left corner and then fired a shot right off the bar top corner. Mike Emrick called it saying, "here come the chapeaus!". The crowd erupted, throwing hats everywhere.

== Boxscore ==
	Western Conference	Eastern Conference
Final score	7	11
Head coach	(Canada) Ken Hitchcock (Dallas Stars)	(Canada) Doug MacLean (Florida Panthers)
Honorary captain	(Canada) Doug Wilson	(Canada) Andy Bathgate
Assistant coach		
Lineup	Starting Lineup: (United States) 7 - D Chris Chelios (Chicago Blackhawks), Captain; (Latvia) 8 - D Sandis Ozolinsh (Colorado Avalanche); (Canada) 9 - LW Paul Kariya (Mighty Ducks of Anaheim); (United States) 16 - RW Brett Hull (St. Louis Blues); (United States) 21 - LW Tony Granato (San Jose Sharks); (Canada) 33 - G Patrick Roy (Colorado Avalanche); Commissioner's Selection: (United States) 21 - LW Tony Granato (San Jose Sharks); (Russia) 22 - D Viacheslav Fetisov (Detroit Red Wings); Reserves: (Canada) 2 - D Al MacInnis (St. Louis Blues); (United States) 3 - D Derian Hatcher (Dallas Stars); (United States) 10 - RW Tony Amonte (Chicago Blackhawks); (Canada) 11 - RW Owen Nolan (San Jose Sharks); (Sweden) 13 - C Mats Sundin (Toronto Maple Leafs); (Canada) 14 - RW Theoren Fleury (Calgary Flames); (Finland) 17 - RW Teemu Selanne (Mighty Ducks of Anaheim); (Canada) 18 - LW Brendan Shanahan (Detroit Red Wings); (Canada) 19 - C Steve Yzerman (Detroit Red Wings); (Russia) 20 - D Oleg Tverdovsky (Phoenix Coyotes); (United States) 31 - G Guy Hebert (Mighty Ducks of Anaheim); (Canada) 35 - G Andy Moog (Dallas Stars); (Canada) 70 - C Jason Arnott (Edmonton Oilers); (United States) 77 - LW Keith Tkachuk (Phoenix Coyotes); (Ukraine) 80 - LW Dmitri Khristich (Los Angeles Kings); (Russia) 96 - RW Pavel Bure (Vancouver Canucks)	Starting Lineup: (United States) 2 - D Brian Leetch (New York Rangers); (United States) 10 - LW John LeClair (Philadelphia Flyers); (Canada) 22 - RW Dino Ciccarelli (Tampa Bay Lightning); (United States) 34 - G John Vanbiesbrouck (Florida Panthers); (Canada) 77 - D Ray Bourque (Boston Bruins); (Canada) 99 - C Wayne Gretzky (New York Rangers), Captain; Commissioner's Selection: (Canada) 15 - C Dale Hawerchuk (Philadelphia Flyers); (Canada) 32 - C Dale Hunter (Washington Capitals); Reserves: (Canada) 4 - D Scott Stevens (New Jersey Devils); (Canada) 7 - D Paul Coffey (Philadelphia Flyers); (Canada) 8 - RW Mark Recchi (Montreal Canadiens); (Sweden) 9 - RW Daniel Alfredsson (Ottawa Senators); (Canada) 11 - C Mark Messier (New York Rangers); (Slovakia) 12 - LW Peter Bondra (Washington Capitals); (United States) 16 - D Scott Lachance (New York Islanders); (Canada) 18 - LW Geoff Sanderson (Hartford Whalers); (Canada) 21 - C Adam Oates (Boston Bruins); (Slovakia) 24 - D Robert Svehla (Florida Panthers); (Canada) 30 - G Martin Brodeur (New Jersey Devils); (Czech Republic) 39 - G Dominik Hasek (Buffalo Sabres); (United States) 44 - D Kevin Hatcher (Pittsburgh Penguins); (Canada) 66 - C Mario Lemieux (Pittsburgh Penguins); (Canada) 88 - C Eric Lindros (Philadelphia Flyers)
Scoring summary	Bure (Sundin, Amonte) 17:36 1st; Kariya (Bure, Ozolinsh) 18:36 1st; Bure (2) (Selanne, Fetisov) 4:40 2nd; Shanahan (Hull, Ozolinsh) 16:38 2nd (PPG); Nolan (Fleury, Ozolinsh) 18:54 2nd; Nolan (2) (Amonte) 19:02 2nd; Nolan (3) (unassisted) 17:57 3rd	LeClair (Bondra, Stevens) 8:52 1st; Lemieux (Gretzky) 9:49 1st; Recchi (Messier, Alfredsson) 15:32 1st; Hawerchuk (Lindros, Coffey) 16:19 1st; Recchi (2) (Svehla, Messier) 1:56 2nd; Sanderson (Lindros) 3:21 2nd; Lemieux (2) (Svehla, Ciccarelli) 6:09 2nd; Messier (K. Hatcher, Alfredsson) 8:45 2nd (GWG); Recchi (3) (Oates, Lemieux) 10:57 2nd; Hawerchuk (2) (LeClair, Stevens) 17:28 2nd; LeClair (2) (Bondra, Oates) 8:50 3rd
Penalties	none	Coffey, hooking 15:37 2nd; Hatcher, hooking 14:56 3rd
Shots on goal	12–13–21–46	15–15–11–41
Win/loss	L - Andy Moog	W - Martin Brodeur

- Referee: Rob Shick
- Linesmen: Ron Asselstine, Bob Hodges, Leon Stickle
- Television: FOX, CBC, SRC

== See also ==
- 1996–97 NHL season

== Notes ==
- ^1 Jaromir Jagr was voted as a starter, but could not play due to injury. Adam Oates replaced him, and John LeClair replaced him in the starting lineup.
- ^2 Joe Sakic was voted as a starter, but could not play due to injury. Teemu Selanne replaced him, and Tony Granato — who was already selected by the Commissioner — replaced him in the starting lineup.
- ^3 Peter Forsberg was selected, but could not play due to injury. Brendan Shanahan replaced him.
- ^4 Zigmund Palffy was selected, but could not play due to injury. Scott Lachance replaced him.
- ^5 Chris Osgood was selected, but could not play due to injury. Guy Hebert replaced him.
- ^6 Mike Modano was selected, but could not play due to injury. Keith Tkachuk replaced him.
- ^7 Rob Blake was selected, but was could not play due to injury. Dmitri Khristich replaced him.
