= 1995–96 Philadelphia Flyers season =

NHL hockey team season

1995–96 Philadelphia Flyers
- Atlantic Division champions
- Division: 1st Atlantic
- Conference: 1st Eastern
- 1995–96 record: 45–24–13
- Home record: 27–9–5
- Road record: 18–15–8
- Goals for: 282
- Goals against: 208

Team information
- General manager: Bob Clarke
- Coach: Terry Murray
- Captain: Eric Lindros
- Alternate captains: Rod Brind'Amour; Eric Desjardins (Mar.–May); Craig MacTavish (Oct.–Mar.)
- Arena: CoreStates Spectrum
- Average attendance: 17,345
- Minor league affiliates: Hershey Bears; Mobile Mysticks

Team leaders
- Goals: John LeClair (51)
- Assists: Eric Lindros (68)
- Points: Eric Lindros (115)
- Penalty minutes: Shawn Antoski (204)
- Plus/minus: Petr Svoboda (+28)
- Wins: Ron Hextall (31)
- Goals against average: Ron Hextall (2.17)

The 1995–96 Philadelphia Flyers season was the franchise's 29th season in the National Hockey League (NHL). In the Spectrum's final season the Flyers repeated as Atlantic Division champs and clinched the top seed in the Eastern Conference, but the Flyers lost in the conference semifinals to the Florida Panthers in six games.

== Regular season ==
Building on the success of the lockout season, the Flyers began the year with a 7–1 rout in Montreal over the Canadiens. An early 5–0–1 stretch was derailed in a 5–4 loss to Chicago on October 22, in which Dominic Roussel turned in a poor performance in net. It would be one of several in the early going which forced head coach Terry Murray to favor Garth Snow as the backup to Ron Hextall.

Lindros was hurt in early November, and the club limped to a 2–4–1 record in his absence. However, after his return they ripped off eight straight wins as part of a 12–2–2 stretch which put them in contention in the Atlantic Division with the Florida Panthers. However, the momentum switched and the club struggled to a 3–6–7 record thereafter.

A 3–2 home overtime win over Montreal on February 1, in which defenseman Petr Svoboda was elbowed in the head by Marc Bureau, finally lit a fire under the team. In addition, the trade-deadline acquisition of Dale Hawerchuk, who was needed in Mikael Renberg's absence, spurred a 13–3–0 charge at the end of the season. Thanks to a 6–5 Bruins win over the Penguins on the final day, the Flyers gained the top spot in the Eastern Conference following a 3–1 win over Tampa.

Lindros hit the 100-point mark in a 3–0 win over Hartford on March 25, while LeClair netted his 50th goal of the season in a 5–1 win in New Jersey on April 10. In an ironic twist, Avalanche forward Claude Lemieux notched the game-winning goal on a fluke shot in a Colorado 5–3 win in Philly on February 11. With the Devils the previous June, Lemieux hit the net from 50 feet out to give his club a 3–2 win in Game 5 of the conference finals.

On April 2, the Flyers scored three short-handed goals in a 6–2 win over the New York Islanders.

On April 11, the Flyers organization celebrated the final regular-season game in the Spectrum. The home team took care of their end, topping the Canadiens 3–2. After the game, an emotional torch-passing ceremony saw past and present team members skating alongside each other, with a symbolic transference of leadership from Bobby Clarke to Lindros.

=== Season standings ===
Atlantic Division
No.		GP	W	L	T	GF	GA	Pts
1	**Philadelphia Flyers**	82	45	24	13	282	208	103
2	**New York Rangers**	82	41	27	14	272	237	96
3	**Florida Panthers**	82	41	31	10	254	234	92
4	**Washington Capitals**	82	39	32	11	234	204	89
5	**Tampa Bay Lightning**	82	38	32	12	238	248	88
6	New Jersey Devils	82	37	33	12	215	202	86
7	New York Islanders	82	22	50	10	229	315	54

Eastern Conference
R		Div	GP	W	L	T	GF	GA	Pts
**1**	**Philadelphia Flyers**	**ATL**	**82**	**45**	**24**	**13**	**282**	**208**	**103**
**2**	**Pittsburgh Penguins**	**NE**	**82**	**49**	**29**	**4**	**362**	**284**	**102**
**3**	**New York Rangers**	**ATL**	**82**	**41**	**27**	**14**	**272**	**237**	**96**
**4**	**Florida Panthers**	**ATL**	**82**	**41**	**31**	**10**	**254**	**234**	**92**
**5**	**Boston Bruins**	**NE**	**82**	**40**	**31**	**11**	**282**	**269**	**91**
**6**	**Montreal Canadiens**	**NE**	**82**	**40**	**32**	**10**	**265**	**248**	**90**
**7**	**Washington Capitals**	**ATL**	**82**	**39**	**32**	**11**	**234**	**204**	**89**
**8**	**Tampa Bay Lightning**	**ATL**	**82**	**38**	**32**	**12**	**238**	**248**	**88**
9	New Jersey Devils	ATL	82	37	33	12	215	202	86
10	Hartford Whalers	NE	82	34	39	9	237	259	77
11	Buffalo Sabres	NE	82	33	42	7	247	262	73
12	New York Islanders	ATL	82	22	50	10	229	315	54
13	Ottawa Senators	NE	82	18	59	5	191	291	41

Divisions: ATL – Atlantic, NE – Northeast

bold – Qualified for playoffs

== Playoffs ==
With the top spot in the Eastern Conference, the Flyers drew their division rival, the Tampa Bay Lightning, coached by former Flyer Terry Crisp. After a 7–3 Philly home rout in Game 1, Lightning goalie Daren Puppa was spectacular and Brian Bradley notched the OT winner in a 2–1 Game 2 triumph. Former draft pick Alexander Selivanov ended Game 3 in Tampa with an overtime goal. Hawerchuk and LeClair provided leadership and goals in a 4–1 road win in Game 4, then the Flyers won 4–1 in Game 5 at the Spectrum. The Flyers closed out the series with a 6–1 score in Game 6 at the Thunderdome.

Next up in the conference semifinals were the Florida Panthers, a team which relied on goaltender John Vanbiesbrouck and the neutral zone trap for success. Vanbiesbrouck posted a 2–0 shutout in Game 1, and it took until midway through Game 2 for the Flyers to get rolling offensively in a narrow 3–2 win. Game 3 saw Flyers veterans Dan Quinn, Hawerchuk, Desjardins and Hextall set the tone in a 3–1 victory.

The Flyers were defeated in overtime in Game 4 and double-overtime in Game 5. The Panthers ended the Flyers' season in Game 6.

== Schedule and results ==
=== Regular season ===
1995–96 regular season
October: 7–1–3, 17 points (home: 4–0–1; road: 3–1–2)

Game	Date	Score	Opponent	Decision	Record	Points	Recap
1	October 7	7–1	@ Montreal Canadiens	Hextall	1–0–0	2	W
2	October 11	2–1	Washington Capitals	Hextall	2–0–0	4	W
3	October 14	3–0	@ New York Islanders	Roussel	3–0–0	6	W
4	October 15	7–1	Edmonton Oilers	Hextall	4–0–0	8	W
5	October 18	1–1 OT	@ Los Angeles Kings	Roussel	4–0–1	9	T
6	October 20	4–2	@ Mighty Ducks of Anaheim	Hextall	5–0–1	11	W
7	October 22	4–5	@ Chicago Blackhawks	Roussel	5–1–1	11	L
8	October 25	3–1	New York Islanders	Roussel	6–1–1	13	W
9	October 28	5–5 OT	@ New York Islanders	Roussel	6–1–2	14	T
10	October 29	5–2	Ottawa Senators	Snow	7–1–2	16	W
11	October 31	2–2 OT	Tampa Bay Lightning	Snow	7–1–3	17	T

November: 9–5–1, 19 points (home: 7–2–0; road: 2–3–1)

Game	Date	Score	Opponent	Decision	Record	Points	Recap
12	November 2	1–2	Florida Panthers	Roussel	7–2–3	17	L
13	November 4	4–7	@ Pittsburgh Penguins	Snow	7–3–3	17	L
14	November 5	6–1	Hartford Whalers	Snow	8–3–3	19	W
15	November 7	2–4	@ Florida Panthers	Snow	8–4–3	19	L
16	November 9	3–1	Calgary Flames	Hextall	9–4–3	21	W
17	November 11	2–4	@ New Jersey Devils	Roussel	9–5–3	21	L
18	November 12	2–3	New Jersey Devils	Hextall	9–6–3	21	L
19	November 14	2–2 OT	@ Washington Capitals	Hextall	9–6–4	22	T
20	November 16	5–3	Ottawa Senators	Hextall	10–6–4	24	W
21	November 18	4–2	@ Hartford Whalers	Snow	11–6–4	26	W
22	November 19	3–2 OT	Vancouver Canucks	Hextall	12–6–4	28	W
23	November 21	5–2	Los Angeles Kings	Snow	13–6–4	30	W
24	November 24	4–1	Detroit Red Wings	Snow	14–6–4	32	W
25	November 29	2–1 OT	@ Florida Panthers	Hextall	15–6–4	34	W
26	November 30	3–2	Toronto Maple Leafs	Snow	16–6–4	36	W

December: 6–5–2, 14 points (home: 4–2–0; road: 2–3–2)

Game	Date	Score	Opponent	Decision	Record	Points	Recap
27	December 3	6–1	Boston Bruins	Hextall	17–6–4	38	W
28	December 5	3–5	@ Detroit Red Wings	Snow	17–7–4	38	L
29	December 7	7–3	Buffalo Sabres	Hextall	18–7–4	40	W
30	December 10	2–6	New York Islanders	Hextall	18–8–4	40	L
31	December 14	4–0	Tampa Bay Lightning	Hextall	19–8–4	42	W
32	December 16	4–2	@ Montreal Canadiens	Hextall	20–8–4	44	W
33	December 17	6–5	Pittsburgh Penguins	Snow	21–8–4	46	W
34	December 19	4–5 OT	@ New Jersey Devils	Hextall	21–9–4	46	L
35	December 21	1–2	New York Rangers	Hextall	21–10–4	46	L
36	December 23	3–3 OT	@ Hartford Whalers	Snow	21–10–5	47	T
37	December 27	2–3	@ Edmonton Oilers	Hextall	21–11–5	47	L
38	December 29	3–2	@ Calgary Flames	Hextall	22–11–5	49	W
39	December 31	5–5 OT	@ Vancouver Canucks	Hextall	22–11–6	50	T

January: 2–3–5, 9 points (home: 1–1–3; road: 1–2–2)

Game	Date	Score	Opponent	Decision	Record	Points	Recap
40	January 3	3–1	@ San Jose Sharks	Hextall	23–11–6	52	W
41	January 4	2–2 OT	@ Colorado Avalanche	Snow	23–11–7	53	T
42	January 9	2–2 OT	Mighty Ducks of Anaheim	Snow	23–11–8	54	T
43	January 11	4–4 OT	St. Louis Blues	Hextall	23–12–9	55	T
44	January 13	0–4	New York Rangers	Hextall	23–13–9	55	L
45	January 15	6–1	Dallas Stars	Hextall	24–13–9	57	W
46	January 22	1–1 OT	Florida Panthers	Hextall	24–12–10	58	T
47	January 24	4–4 OT	@ New York Rangers	Hextall	24–12–11	59	T
48	January 27	4–7	@ Pittsburgh Penguins	Snow	24–13–11	59	L
49	January 28	2–3 OT	@ Washington Capitals	Hextall	24–14–11	59	L

February: 7–4–1, 15 points (home: 4–2–0; road: 3–2–1)

Game	Date	Score	Opponent	Decision	Record	Points	Recap
50	February 1	3–2 OT	Montreal Canadiens	Hextall	25–14–11	61	W
51	February 3	7–3	@ St. Louis Blues	Hextall	26–14–11	63	W
52	February 8	1–2	Buffalo Sabres	Hextall	26–15–11	63	L
53	February 10	6–2	@ Boston Bruins	Snow	27–15–11	65	W
54	February 11	3–5	Colorado Avalanche	Hextall	27–16–11	65	L
55	February 14	4–2	@ Florida Panthers	Hextall	28–16–11	67	W
56	February 17	2–5	@ Tampa Bay Lightning	Snow	28–17–11	67	L
57	February 19	4–1	New Jersey Devils	Hextall	29–17–11	69	W
58	February 22	5–3	Washington Capitals	Hextall	30–17–11	71	W
59	February 23	2–7	@ Buffalo Sabres	Snow	30–18–11	71	L
60	February 25	3–2	Chicago Blackhawks	Hextall	31–18–11	73	W
61	February 28	4–4 OT	@ Dallas Stars	Hextall	31–18–12	74	T

March: 9–4–1, 19 points (home: 5–1–1; road: 4–3–0)

Game	Date	Score	Opponent	Decision	Record	Points	Recap
62	March 1	3–2	@ Ottawa Senators	Hextall	32–18–12	76	W
63	March 3	0–3	@ Washington Capitals	Hextall	32–19–12	76	L
64	March 9	2–3	@ Boston Bruins	Snow	32–20–12	76	L
65	March 10	2–3 OT	New Jersey Devils	Snow	32–21–12	76	L
66	March 13	1–1 OT	Tampa Bay Lightning	Hextall	32–21–13	77	T
67	March 16	3–0	Winnipeg Jets	Hextall	33–21–13	79	W
68	March 17	8–2	San Jose Sharks	Snow	34–21–13	81	W
69	March 19	4–1	New York Islanders	Hextall	35–21–13	83	W
70	March 22	1–4	@ Winnipeg Jets	Hextall	35–22–13	83	L
71	March 23	4–0	@ Toronto Maple Leafs	Hextall	36–22–13	85	W
72	March 25	3–0	Hartford Whalers	Hextall	37–22–13	87	W
73	March 27	4–2	@ Ottawa Senators	Hextall	38–22–13	89	W
74	March 29	6–5 OT	@ Buffalo Sabres	Snow	39–22–13	91	W
75	March 31	4–1	Pittsburgh Penguins	Hextall	40–22–13	93	W

April: 5–2–0, 10 points (home: 2–1–0; road: 3–1–0)

Game	Date	Score	Opponent	Decision	Record	Points	Recap
76	April 2	6–2	@ New York Islanders	Snow	41–22–13	95	W
77	April 4	4–1	New York Rangers	Hextall	42–22–13	97	W
78	April 5	1–3	@ New York Rangers	Hextall	42–23–13	97	L
79	April 7	2–4	Boston Bruins	Hextall	42–24–13	97	L
80	April 10	5–1	@ New Jersey Devils	Hextall	43–24–13	99	W
81	April 11	3–2	Montreal Canadiens	Hextall	44–24–13	101	W
82	April 14	3–1	@ Tampa Bay Lightning	Snow	45–24–13	103	W

Legend: W Win (2 points) L Loss (0 points) T Tie (1 point)

=== Playoffs ===
1996 Stanley Cup playoffs
Eastern Conference quarterfinals vs. Tampa Bay Lightning – Flyers win 4–2

Game	Date	Score	Opponent	Decision	Attendance	Series	Recap
1	April 16	7–3	Tampa Bay Lightning	Hextall	17,380	Flyers lead 1–0	W
2	April 18	1–2 OT	Tampa Bay Lightning	Hextall	17,380	Series tied 1–1	L
3	April 21	4–5 OT	@ Tampa Bay Lightning	Hextall	25,945	Lightning lead 2–1	L
4	April 23	4–1	@ Tampa Bay Lightning	Hextall	28,183	Series tied 2–2	W
5	April 25	4–1	Tampa Bay Lightning	Hextall	17,380	Flyers lead 3–2	W
6	April 27	6–1	@ Tampa Bay Lightning	Hextall	27,189	Flyers win 4–2	W

Eastern Conference semifinals vs. Florida Panthers – Panthers win 4–2

Game	Date	Score	Opponent	Decision	Attendance	Series	Recap
1	May 2	0–2	Florida Panthers	Hextall	17,380	Panthers lead 1–0	L
2	May 4	3–2	Florida Panthers	Hextall	17,380	Series tied 1–1	W
3	May 7	3–1	@ Florida Panthers	Hextall	14,703	Flyers lead 2–1	W
4	May 9	3–4 OT	@ Florida Panthers	Hextall	14,703	Series tied 2–2	L
5	May 12	1–2 2OT	Florida Panthers	Hextall	17,380	Panthers lead 3–2	L
6	May 14	1–4	@ Florida Panthers	Hextall	14,703	Panthers win 4–2	L

Legend: W Win L Loss

== Player statistics ==
=== Scoring ===
- Position abbreviations: C = Center; D = Defense; G = Goaltender; LW = Left wing; RW = Right wing
- † = Joined team via a transaction (e.g., trade, waivers, signing) during the season. Stats reflect time with the Flyers only.
- ‡ = Left team via a transaction (e.g., trade, waivers, release) during the season. Stats reflect time with the Flyers only.

No.	Player	Pos	Regular season						Playoffs					
No.	Player	Pos	GP	G	A	Pts	+/-	PIM	GP	G	A	Pts	+/-	PIM
88	Eric Lindros	C	73	47	68	115	26	163	12	6	6	12	−1	43
10	John LeClair	LW	82	51	46	97	21	64	11	6	5	11	3	6
17	Rod Brind'Amour	C	82	26	61	87	20	110	12	2	5	7	−2	6
15	Pat Falloon†	RW	62	22	26	48	15	6	12	3	2	5	−2	2
37	Eric Desjardins	D	80	7	40	47	19	45	12	0	6	6	−5	2
19	Mikael Renberg	RW	51	23	20	43	8	45	11	3	6	9	1	14
29	Joel Otto	C	67	12	29	41	11	115	12	3	4	7	4	11
23	Petr Svoboda	D	73	1	28	29	28	105	12	0	6	6	6	22
25	Shjon Podein	LW	79	15	10	25	25	89	12	1	2	3	2	50
6	Chris Therien	D	82	6	17	23	16	89	12	0	0	0	−5	18
11	Dan Quinn†	C	35	7	14	21	2	22	12	1	4	5	−3	6
9	Rob DiMaio	RW	59	6	15	21	0	58	3	0	0	0	−1	0
24	Karl Dykhuis	D	82	5	15	20	12	101	12	2	2	4	6	22
18	Dale Hawerchuk†	RW	16	4	16	20	10	4	12	3	6	9	0	12
44	Anatoli Semenov‡	C	44	3	13	16	3	14	—	—	—	—	—	—
18	Brent Fedyk‡	LW	24	10	5	15	1	24	—	—	—	—	—	—
5	Kevin Haller	D	69	5	9	14	18	92	6	0	1	1	0	8
28	Kjell Samuelsson	D	75	3	11	14	20	81	12	1	0	1	0	24
14	Craig MacTavish‡	C	55	5	8	13	−3	62	—	—	—	—	—	—
20	Trent Klatt†	RW	49	3	8	11	2	21	12	4	1	5	1	0
26	John Druce†	RW	13	4	4	8	6	13	2	0	2	2	1	2
22	Bob Corkum†	C	28	4	3	7	3	8	12	1	2	3	−1	6
12	Patrik Juhlin	RW	14	3	3	6	4	17	—	—	—	—	—	—
8	Shawn Antoski	LW	64	1	3	4	−4	204	7	1	1	2	3	28
42	Russ Romaniuk	LW	17	3	0	3	−2	17	1	0	0	0	−1	0
32 (Note: Montgomery wore number 22 during the regular season.)	Jim Montgomery	C	5	1	2	3	1	9	1	0	0	0	−1	0
18	Yanick Dupre	LW	12	2	0	2	0	28	—	—	—	—	—	—
26 (Note: Crowe wore number 53 in his first ten games.)	Phil Crowe	LW	16	1	1	2	0	28	—	—	—	—	—	—
2	Kerry Huffman†	D	4	1	1	2	0	6	6	0	0	0	0	2
40	Aris Brimanis	D	17	0	2	2	−1	12	—	—	—	—	—	—
11	Kevin Dineen‡	RW	26	0	2	2	−8	50	—	—	—	—	—	—
21	Dan Kordic	LW	9	1	0	1	1	31	—	—	—	—	—	—
45	Gilbert Dionne‡	LW	2	0	1	1	0	0	—	—	—	—	—	—
27	Ron Hextall	G	53	0	1	1		28	12	0	0	0		6
53	Jason Bowen	D	2	0	0	0	0	2	—	—	—	—	—	—
33	Dominic Roussel‡	G	9	0	0	0		0	—	—	—	—	—	—
3	Darren Rumble	D	5	0	0	0	0	4	—	—	—	—	—	—
30	Garth Snow	G	26	0	0	0		18	1	0	0	0		0

=== Goaltending ===
- ‡ = Left team via a transaction (e.g., trade, waivers, release) during the season. Stats reflect time with the Flyers only.

No.	Player	Regular season											Playoffs									
No.	Player	GP	GS	W	L	T	SA	GA	GAA	SV%	SO	TOI	GP	GS	W	L	SA	GA	GAA	SV%	SO	TOI
27	Ron Hextall	53	51	31	13	7	1292	112	2.17	.913	4	3,102	12	12	6	6	319	27	2.13	.915	0	760
30	Garth Snow	26	23	12	8	4	648	69	2.88	.894	0	1,437	1	0	0	0	0	0	0.00	–	0	1
33	Dominic Roussel‡	9	8	2	3	2	178	22	2.89	.876	1	456	—	—	—	—	—	—	—	—	—	—

== Awards and records ==
=== Awards ===
Type	Award/honor	Recipient	Ref
League (annual)	NHL second All-Star team	John LeClair (Left wing)	
League (annual)	NHL second All-Star team	Eric Lindros (Center)	
League (in-season)	NHL All-Star Game selection	Eric Desjardins	
League (in-season)	NHL All-Star Game selection	John LeClair	
League (in-season)	NHL All-Star Game selection	Eric Lindros	
League (in-season)	NHL All-Star Game selection	Craig MacTavish (Note: Selected by the Commissioner)	
League (in-season)	NHL Player of the Month	Eric Lindros (October)	
League (in-season)	NHL Player of the Week	John LeClair (November 11)	
Team	Barry Ashbee Trophy	Eric Desjardins	
Team	Bobby Clarke Trophy	Eric Lindros	
Team	Class Guy Award	Ron Hextall	
Team	Pelle Lindbergh Memorial Trophy	Shjon Podein	
Miscellaneous	Best NHL Player ESPY Award	Eric Lindros	

=== Records ===
Among the team records set during the 1995–96 season was Eric Lindros setting the franchise single game record with 14 shots on goal on March 19. The Flyers tied the team record for most shorthanded goals in a single game (3) on April 2. Lindros’ 1.58 points per game average during the regular season is a franchise high. The team's four overtime losses during the 1996 Stanley Cup playoffs is tied for the NHL record.

=== Milestones ===
Milestone	Player	Date	Ref
1000th game played	Craig MacTavish	December 19, 1995	

== Transactions ==
The Flyers were involved in the following transactions from June 25, 1995, the day after the deciding game of the 1995 Stanley Cup Final, through June 11, 1996, the day of the deciding game of the 1996 Stanley Cup Final.

=== Trades ===
Date	Details		Ref
June 27, 1995	To Philadelphia Flyers: Russ Romaniuk	To Winnipeg Jets: Rights to Jeff Finley	
July 8, 1995	To Philadelphia Flyers: 5th-round pick in 1996	To Toronto Maple Leafs: Rob Zettler	
July 12, 1995	To Philadelphia Flyers: Rights to Garth Snow	To Colorado Avalanche: 3rd-round pick in 1996; 6th-round pick in 1996	
August 30, 1995	To Philadelphia Flyers: 1st-round pick in 1996; 2nd-round pick in 1997; Los Angeles' 4th-round pick in 1996	To Toronto Maple Leafs: Dmitri Yushkevich; 2nd-round pick in 1996	
September 20, 1995	To Philadelphia Flyers: 7th-round pick in 1997	To Winnipeg Jets: Andre Faust	
November 16, 1995	To Philadelphia Flyers: Pat Falloon	To San Jose Sharks: 1st-round pick in 1996 (Note: The Flyers choice of their own first-round pick or the first-round pick acquired from Toronto in the Yushkevich trade. The Flyers ultimately sent their own first-round pick, 24th overall.); 4th-round pick in 1996; Rights to Martin Spanhel	
December 13, 1995	To Philadelphia Flyers: Trent Klatt	To Dallas Stars: Brent Fedyk	
December 28, 1995	To Philadelphia Flyers: Future considerations (Note: The Flyers would receive a draft pick if the Whalers re-signed Dineen for the 1996–97 season. The Flyers ended up receiving the Whalers' 1997 7th-round pick.)	To Hartford Whalers: Kevin Dineen	
January 23, 1996	To Philadelphia Flyers: Dan Quinn	To Ottawa Senators: Future considerations	
February 6, 1996	To Philadelphia Flyers: Bob Corkum	To Anaheim Mighty Ducks: Chris Herperger; Winnipeg's 7th-round pick in 1997	
February 27, 1996	To Philadelphia Flyers: Tim Cheveldae; 3rd-round pick in 1996	To Winnipeg Jets: Dominic Roussel	
March 15, 1996	To Philadelphia Flyers: Dale Hawerchuk	To St. Louis Blues: Craig MacTavish	
March 19, 1996	To Philadelphia Flyers: Kerry Huffman	To Ottawa Senators: 9th-round pick in 1996	
March 19, 1996	To Philadelphia Flyers: Rights to Brian Wesenberg	To Anaheim Mighty Ducks: Anatoli Semenov; Rights to Mike Crowley	
March 19, 1996	To Philadelphia Flyers: John Druce; 7th-round pick in 1997	To Los Angeles Kings: Los Angeles' 4th-round pick in 1996	

=== Players acquired ===
Date	Player	Former team	Term	Via	Ref
July 7, 1995	Kjell Samuelsson	Pittsburgh Penguins	2-year (Note: Club option for third year)	Free agency	
July 20, 1995	Joel Otto	Calgary Flames	3-year	Free agency	
August 2, 1995	Tony Horacek	Chicago Blackhawks		Free agency	
August 2, 1995	Shawn McCosh	New York Rangers		Free agency	
August 2, 1995	Scott Morrow	Calgary Flames		Free agency	
August 2, 1995	Todd Nelson	Washington Capitals		Free agency	
August 2, 1995	Darren Rumble	Ottawa Senators		Free agency	
June 4, 1996	Craig Darby	New York Islanders		Waivers	

=== Players lost ===
Date	Player	New team	Via (Note: In parentheses is the player's free agency group on July 5 if applicable.)	Ref
August 8, 1995	Stewart Malgunas	Winnipeg Jets	Free agency (II)	
August 10, 1995	Dave Brown	San Jose Sharks	Free agency	
August 23, 1995	Al Conroy	Houston Aeros (IHL)	Free agency (UFA)	
N/A	Shawn Anderson	Milwaukee Admirals (IHL)	Free agency (UFA)	
N/A	Norm Foster		Retirement	
November 1995	Gilbert Dionne	Carolina Monarchs (AHL) (Note: Dionne signed with Carolina on November 17, 1995.)	Buyout	

=== Signings ===
Date	Player	Term	Contract type	Ref
June 29, 1995	Brent Fedyk	2-year	Re-signing	
June 30, 1995	Rob DiMaio		Re-signing	
June 30, 1995	Yanick Dupre		Re-signing	
July 7, 1995	Les Kuntar		Re-signing	
July 10, 1995	Kevin Dineen	1-year	Re-signing	
August 1, 1995	Dominic Roussel		Re-signing	
August 3, 1995	Shjon Podein		Re-signing	
August 7, 1995	Shawn Antoski		Re-signing	
August 10, 1995	Gilbert Dionne	1-year	Re-signing	
August 14, 1995	Rod Brind'Amour	3-year	Re-signing	
September 11, 1995	John LeClair	5-year	Re-signing	
October 5, 1995	Eric Desjardins	4-year	Re-signing	
October 6, 1995	Kevin Haller	multi-year	Re-signing	
October 15, 1995	Mikael Renberg	4-year	Re-signing	
May 28, 1996	Andre Payette		Entry-level	
June 5, 1996	Jason Bowen		Re-signing	

== Draft picks ==
Philadelphia's picks at the 1995 NHL entry draft, which was held at Edmonton Coliseum in Edmonton, Alberta, on July 8, 1995. The Flyers traded their third-round pick, 74th overall, and Mark Recchi to the Montreal Canadiens for Eric Desjardins, Gilbert Dionne and John LeClair on February 9, 1995. They also traded their fifth-round pick, 126th overall, to the Detroit Red Wings for Stewart Malgunas on September 9, 1993.

Round	Pick	Player	Position	Nationality	Team (league)	Notes
1	22	Brian Boucher	Goaltender	United States	Tri-City Americans (WHL)	
2	48	Shane Kenny	Defense	Canada	Owen Sound Platers (OHL)	
4	100	Radovan Somik	Left wing	Slovakia	Martimex ZTS Martin (Slovakia)	
6	132	Dmitri Tertyshny	Defense	Russia	Traktor Chelyabinsk (Russia)	(Note: The Flyers traded Tommy Soderstrom to the New York Islanders for Ron Hextall and the Islanders' sixth-round pick, 132nd overall, on September 22, 1994.)
6	135	Jamie Sokolsky	Defense	Canada	Belleville Bulls (OHL)	(Note: The Flyers traded Ryan McGill to the Edmonton Oilers for Brad Zavisha and the Oilers' sixth-round pick, 135th overall, on March 13, 1995.)
6	152	Martin Spanhel	Left wing	Czech Republic	ZPS Zlin Jrs. (CZE)	
7	178	Martin Streit	Forward	Czech Republic	HC Olomouc (CZE)	
8	204	Ruslan Shafikov	Forward	Russia	Salavat Yulaev (Russia)	
9	230	Jeff Lank	Defense	Canada	Prince Albert Raiders (WHL)	

== Farm teams ==
The Flyers were affiliated with the Hershey Bears of the AHL and the Mobile Mysticks of the ECHL.
