= Antti Törmänen =

Finnish ice hockey player and coach

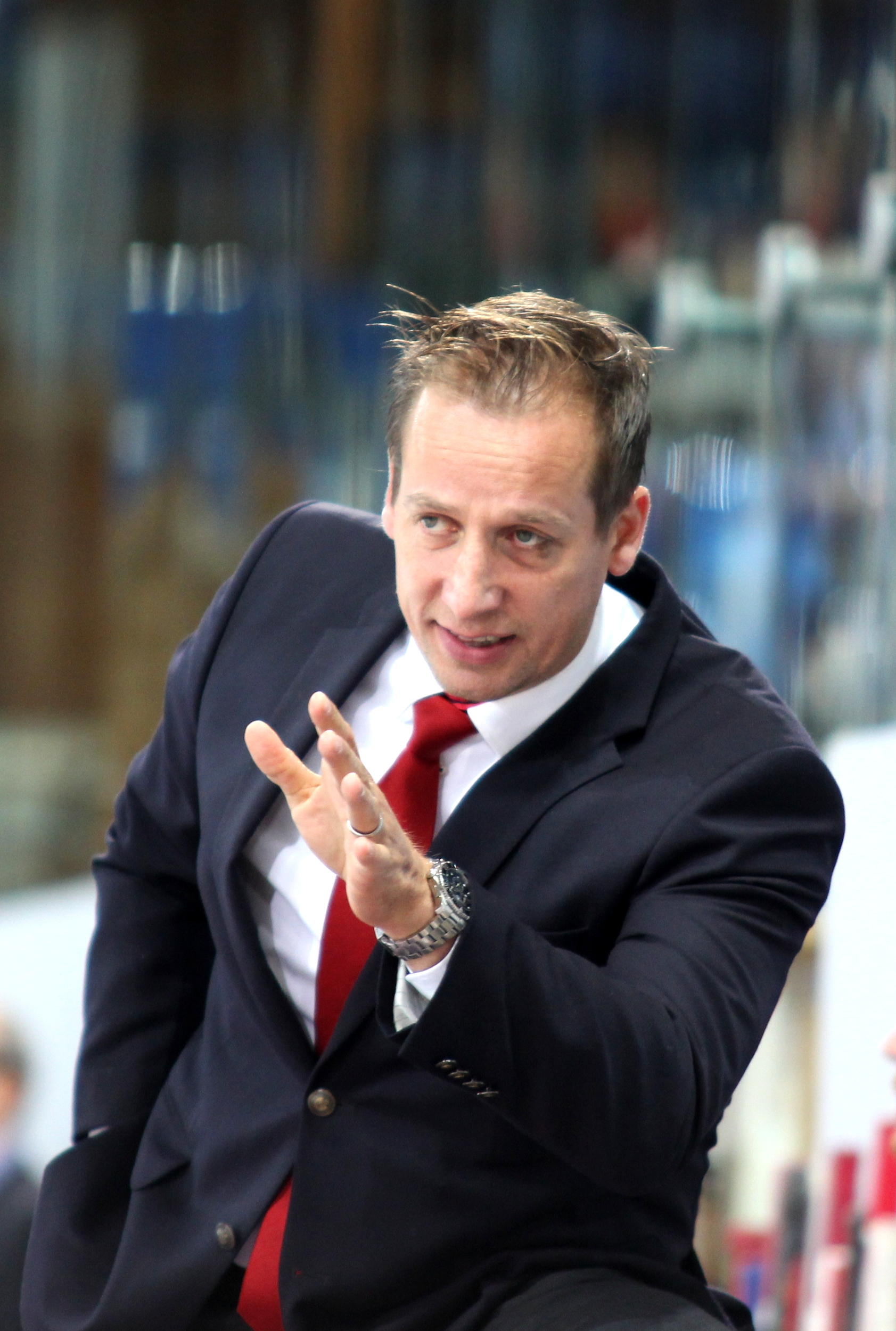
- Törmänen in 2015
- Born: September 19, 1970 (age 55) Espoo, FIN
- Height: 6 ft 1 in (185 cm)
- Weight: 207 lb (94 kg; 14 st 11 lb)
- Position: Left wing
- Shot: Left
- Played for: NHL; Ottawa Senators; SM-liiga; Jokerit Helsinki; SEL; HV71 Jönköping; Södertälje SK
- National team: Finland
- NHL draft: 274th overall, 1994; Ottawa Senators
- Playing career: 1990–2004

Antti Ilari Törmänen (born September 19, 1970) is a retired professional ice hockey player and current head coach of EHC Biel in Switzerland's National League. He played for the Ottawa Senators, Jokerit, HV71 and Södertälje SK over 14 seasons.

== Playing career ==
Törmänen had been playing professionally for Jokerit for four seasons when he was drafted in the 1994 NHL entry draft in the eleventh round, 274th overall by the Ottawa Senators of the NHL. After one more season with Jokerit, he signed with the Senators for the 1995–96 season. Törmänen played in 50 games for the Senators and 22 games with the Prince Edward Island Senators. This was his only season in North America. After the season, he returned to Europe where he returned to Jokerit, and also played for HV71 Jönköping and Södertälje SK until retiring after the 2003–04 season. His best season statistically was 1993–94 with Jokerit where he scored 20 goals and 18 assists in 46 games.

As a player, he was nicknamed "Törminator".

== Coaching career ==
Törmänen coached Espoo Blues U18 and U20 teams, winning U20 title in 2009. He then moved to Jokerit and was assistant coach of the team, before being sacked mid-season along with head coach Hannu Aravirta. In the 2010–11 season, he was the head coach of Sport in Finland's second-tier Mestis, guiding the team to the title, while being named Mestis Coach of the Year.

He joined SC Bern of the Swiss National League A (NLA) as an assistant coach for the 2010–11 season and on October 21, 2011, he was promoted from assistant to head coach, replacing Larry Huras. He led SCB to the NLA title in 2013, but was sacked the following season after a stretch of nine losses in twelve games.

In April 2014, Törmänen agreed to become head coach of the Finnish Liiga side HIFK. He parted ways with the club at the conclusion of the 2016–17 season. On December 11, 2017, he took over the head coaching job at EHC Biel in the Swiss National League.

In July 2020 he was diagnosed with gallbladder cancer.

== Career statistics ==
=== Regular season and playoffs ===
			Regular season					Playoffs
Season	Team	League	GP	G	A	Pts	PIM	GP	G	A	Pts	PIM
1987–88	Kiekko-Espoo	FIN U20	32	21	21	42	18	—	—	—	—	—
1988–89	Kiekko-Espoo	FIN U20	6	4	8	12	8	4	6	6	12	0
1988–89	Kiekko-Espoo	FIN.2	39	11	8	19	27	—	—	—	—	—
1989–90	Kiekko-Espoo	FIN U20	8	7	7	14	8	5	6	6	12	4
1989–90	Kiekko-Espoo	FIN.2	41	13	15	28	16	—	—	—	—	—
1989–90	Urheilukoulu	FIN U20	8	3	5	8	10	—	—	—	—	—
1990–91	Jokerit	FIN U20	3	4	0	4	4	—	—	—	—	—
1990–91	Jokerit	SM-l	44	12	9	21	70	—	—	—	—	—
1991–92	Jokerit	SM-l	40	18	11	29	18	6	0	0	0	0
1992–93	Jokerit	SM-l	21	2	0	2	8	3	0	1	1	0
1992–93	Vantaa HT	FIN.2	6	2	3	5	6	—	—	—	—	—
1993–94	Jokerit	SM-l	46	20	18	38	46	12	4	3	7	14
1994–95	Jokerit	SM-l	50	19	13	32	32	11	7	4	11	20
1995–96	Ottawa Senators	NHL	50	7	8	15	28	—	—	—	—	—
1995–96	PEI Senators	AHL	22	6	11	17	17	5	2	3	5	2
1996–97	Jokerit	SM-l	50	18	14	32	54	9	3	5	8	10
1997–98	Jokerit	SM-l	48	20	14	34	56	8	3	2	5	12
1998–99	HV71	SEL	50	14	22	36	50	—	—	—	—	—
1999–2000	HV71	SEL	50	18	15	33	76	6	2	4	6	20
2000–01	Jokerit	SM-l	56	15	19	34	73	5	0	1	1	2
2001–02	Jokerit	SM-l	55	13	15	28	73	12	0	2	2	4
2002–03	Södertälje SK	SEL	49	12	21	33	46	—	—	—	—	—
2003–04	Södertälje SK	SEL	25	6	3	9	26	—	—	—	—	—
FIN.2 totals			86	27	25	52	49	—	—	—	—	—
SM-l totals			410	137	113	250	430	66	17	18	35	62
SEL totals			174	50	61	111	198	6	2	4	6	20

=== International ===
Year	Team	Event	GP	G	A	Pts	PIM
1988	Finland	EJC	—	1	—	—	—
1995	Finland	WC	5	0	0	0	2
1997	Finland	WC	5	0	1	1	2
1998	Finland	OG	5	0	0	0	0
1998	Finland	WC	10	3	2	5	6
1999	Finland	WC	12	0	0	0	10
Senior totals			37	3	3	6	20
