= 1995–96 Detroit Red Wings season =

Sports season

1995–96 Detroit Red Wings
- Presidents' Trophy winners
- Central Division champions
- Division: 1st Central
- Conference: 1st Western
- 1995–96 record: 62–13–7
- Home record: 36–3–2
- Road record: 26–10–5
- Goals for: 325
- Goals against: 181

Team information
- General manager: Scotty Bowman; Jim Devellano
- Coach: Scotty Bowman
- Captain: Steve Yzerman
- Alternate captains: Paul Coffey; Sergei Fedorov
- Arena: Joe Louis Arena
- Average attendance: 19,923 (100%); Total: 816,850
- Minor league affiliates: Adirondack Red Wings (AHL); Toledo Storm (ECHL); Jacksonville Bullets (SHL)

Team leaders
- Goals: Sergei Fedorov (39)
- Assists: Sergei Fedorov (68)
- Points: Sergei Fedorov (107)
- Penalty minutes: Keith Primeau (168)
- Plus/minus: Vladimir Konstantinov (+60)
- Wins: Chris Osgood (39)
- Goals against average: Chris Osgood (2.17)

The 1995–96 Detroit Red Wings season was the 70th season for the National Hockey League (NHL) franchise that was established on September 25, 1926.

Regarded as one of the greatest regular seasons in NHL history, the Red Wings eclipsed the all-time record of most regular-season wins with 62, a record previously set at 60 by the 1976–77 Montreal Canadiens. This record was later tied by the 2018–19 Tampa Bay Lightning, and broken by the 2022–23 Boston Bruins, with their groundbreaking 65 wins that was set as a new NHL record. During the regular season, they garnered a total of 131 points, marking the highest tally since the Montreal Canadiens amassed 132 points in 1976–77. They surpassed most of that year's NBA season win records except for the Seattle SuperSonics (64–18) and the Chicago Bulls (72–10) being the only teams to win more games. The Red Wings had two winning streaks of nine games and had a 13-game unbeaten streak from March 3, 1996, to March 31, going 12–0–1 during that stretch.

Having the best record in the league, the Red Wings were awarded the Presidents' Trophy. During the 1995–96 regular season, the Red Wings were the only team to score at least one goal in all 82 of its games. While the team is remembered for its record-breaking regular season, it ended in heartbreaking fashion in the playoffs. Detroit lost five games to Winnipeg and St. Louis, both teams that failed to get above 80 points in the regular season, including having to go to a decisive game 7 against St. Louis. They were ultimately upset by the eventual Stanley Cup champion Colorado Avalanche, winning only two of the six games in the series, and failed to reach the Stanley Cup Finals. Throughout the season, the Red Wings achieved a total of 72 victories, which was on par with the 1976-77 Canadiens.

== Off-season ==
In September 1995, the former 1974 draft pick and attorney Bill Evo was appointed president the Detroit Red Wings.

== Regular season ==
- November 28, 1995: The Montreal Canadiens were playing the Red Wings at Joe Louis Arena. The day before the game, Mario Tremblay spoke to Mario Leclerc of Le Journal de Montreal. Tremblay mentioned that he was resentful of current Red Wings head coach Scotty Bowman. He had played under Bowman for the first five years of his NHL career, and Tremblay told Leclerc that Bowman always threatened to send him to the minors. When Leclerc approached Cournoyer, he stated that he did not want to speak about Bowman. The Canadiens lost the game by a score of 3–2. The next day, Le Journal de Montreal had a headline that stated, "Bowman has the last word."
- December 2, 1995: The Red Wings played at the Montreal Forum (their final season for the Habs before they moved to the Bell Centre) and dealt Tremblay's Montreal Canadiens their worst home game in franchise history, with an 11–1 win. The Habs' star goaltender Patrick Roy allowed nine goals on 26 shots (five in the first period, and then another four in the second period), and the crowd jeered him whenever he made an easy save during the second period after the game was already 7–1 in favor of the Red Wings. In response, Roy raised his arms in mock celebration. When Head Coach Mario Tremblay finally pulled Roy in the middle of the second period in favor of Pat Jablonski (who allowed two more goals), Roy stormed past him and told Canadiens President Ronald Corey, "It's my last game in Montreal." Tremblay was roundly criticized for not relieving Roy earlier, violating the unwritten rule that a star goaltender be taken out of the game once it is clear he is having an off-night. Roy was traded to the Colorado Avalanche after that game, and he played a key role in eliminating the Red Wings during the Western Conference Finals, precipitating the Avalanche–Red Wings rivalry.
- Against the Hartford Whalers on March 6, 1996, Chris Osgood became the third goaltender in NHL history to score a goal.
- On March 22, 1996, the Red Wings scored three short-handed goals in a 7–0 win over the Colorado Avalanche, clinching the Presidents' Trophy.

The Red Wings finished first in wins (62), points (131), tied the Washington Capitals for most shutouts (9), allowed the fewest goals (181), the fewest even-strength goals (128), the fewest power-play goals (44) and had the best penalty-kill percentage (88.27%).

=== Season standings ===
Central Division
No.		GP	W	L	T	GF	GA	Pts
1	**Detroit Red Wings**	82	62	13	7	325	181	131
2	**Chicago Blackhawks**	82	40	28	14	273	220	94
3	**Toronto Maple Leafs**	82	34	36	12	247	252	80
4	**St. Louis Blues**	82	32	34	16	219	248	80
5	**Winnipeg Jets**	82	36	40	6	275	291	78
6	Dallas Stars	82	26	42	14	227	280	66

Note: GP = Games played; W = Wins; L = Losses; T = Ties; GF = Goals for; GA = Goals against; Pts = Points
Bolded teams qualified for the playoffs.

Western Conference
R		Div	GP	W	L	T	GF	GA	Pts
**1**	**p – Detroit Red Wings**	**CEN**	**82**	**62**	**13**	**7**	**325**	**181**	**131**
**2**	**Colorado Avalanche**	**PAC**	**82**	**47**	**25**	**10**	**326**	**240**	**104**
**3**	**Chicago Blackhawks**	**CEN**	**82**	**40**	**28**	**14**	**273**	**220**	**94**
**4**	**Toronto Maple Leafs**	**CEN**	**82**	**34**	**36**	**12**	**247**	**252**	**80**
**5**	**St. Louis Blues**	**CEN**	**82**	**32**	**34**	**16**	**219**	**248**	**80**
**6**	**Calgary Flames**	**PAC**	**82**	**34**	**37**	**11**	**241**	**240**	**79**
**7**	**Vancouver Canucks**	**PAC**	**82**	**32**	**35**	**15**	**278**	**278**	**79**
**8**	**Winnipeg Jets**	**CEN**	**82**	**36**	**40**	**6**	**275**	**291**	**78**
9	Mighty Ducks of Anaheim	PAC	82	35	39	8	234	247	78
10	Edmonton Oilers	PAC	82	30	44	8	240	304	68
11	Dallas Stars	CEN	82	26	42	14	227	280	66
12	Los Angeles Kings	PAC	82	24	40	18	256	302	66
13	San Jose Sharks	PAC	82	20	55	7	252	357	47

Divisions: CEN – Central, PAC – Pacific

bold – Qualified for playoffs; p – Won Presidents' Trophy

== Playoffs ==
In the first round of the playoffs, the Red Wings defeated the eighth-seeded Winnipeg Jets marking the Jets' final games in Winnipeg as the franchise relocated to Phoenix following their playoff defeat. The Wings then defeated the fifth-place St. Louis Blues in the second round. In the Western Conference Finals, the Red Wings were ousted in six games by the Colorado Avalanche, who were in the first year after moving from Quebec. These two teams started the Avalanche–Red Wings rivalry, which lasted nearly a decade.

== Schedule and results ==
=== Regular season ===
1995–96 regular season
October: 5–4–2 (home: 2–1–1; road: 3–3–1)

Game	Date	Visitor	Score	Home	OT	Decision	Attendance	Record	Points	Recap
1	October 6	Detroit	2–3	Colorado		Vernon	16,061	0–1–0	0	L
2	October 8	Detroit	3–1	Edmonton		Osgood	13,302	1–1–0	2	W
3	October 9	Detroit	5–3	Vancouver		Vernon	19,024	2–1–0	4	W
4	October 13	Edmonton	0–9	Detroit		Osgood	19,875	3–1–0	6	W
5	October 15	Detroit	5–5	Winnipeg	OT	Vernon	9,399	3–1–1	7	T
6	October 17	Calgary	3–3	Detroit	OT	Osgood	19,638	3–1–2	8	T
7	October 19	Detroit	2–4	New Jersey		Vernon	16,147	3–2–2	8	L
8	October 21	Boston	2–4	Detroit		Osgood	19,875	4–2–2	10	W
9	October 24	Ottawa	2–1	Detroit		Vernon	19,512	4–3–2	10	L
10	October 27	Detroit	3–0	Calgary		Osgood	19,001	5–3–2	12	W
11	October 30	Detroit	2–3	Winnipeg		Osgood	7,905	5–4–2	12	L

November: 9–2–0 (home: 5–0–0; road: 4–2–0)

Game	Date	Visitor	Score	Home	OT	Decision	Attendance	Record	Points	Recap
12	November 1	Detroit	1–2	Buffalo		Osgood	12,653	5–5–2	12	L
13	November 2	Detroit	6–5	Boston	OT	Osgood	17,565	6–5–2	14	W
14	November 4	Dallas	1–5	Detroit		Osgood	19,852	7–5–2	16	W
15	November 7	Edmonton	2–4	Detroit		Osgood	19,776	8–5–2	18	W
16	November 11	Detroit	5–2	San Jose		Vernon	17,190	9–5–2	20	W
17	November 14	Detroit	6–5	Los Angeles		Osgood	14,154	10–5–2	22	W
18	November 17	Detroit	5–4	Edmonton		Vernon	10,803	11–5–2	24	W
19	November 22	San Jose	2–5	Detroit		Osgood	19,983	12–5–2	26	W
20	November 24	Detroit	1–4	Philadelphia		Vernon	17,380	12–6–2	26	L
21	November 25	NY Rangers	0–2	Detroit		Osgood	19,983	13–6–2	28	W
22	November 28	Montreal	2–3	Detroit		Osgood	19,945	14–6–2	30	W

December: 13–1–0 (home: 7–0–0; road: 6–1–0)

Game	Date	Visitor	Score	Home	OT	Decision	Attendance	Record	Points	Recap
23	December 1	Anaheim	2–5	Detroit		Vernon	19,881	15–6–2	32	W
24	December 2	Detroit	11–1	Montreal		Vernon	17,803	16–6–2	34	W
25	December 5	Philadelphia	3–5	Detroit		Osgood	19,918	17–6–2	36	W
26	December 7	Dallas	1–3	Detroit		Vernon	19,640	18–6–2	38	W
27	December 8	Detroit	1–2	NY Rangers	OT	Osgood	18,200	18–7–2	38	L
28	December 12	Detroit	5–2	St. Louis		Vernon	17,965	19–7–2	40	W
29	December 13	Chicago	1–3	Detroit		Osgood	19,983	20–7–2	42	W
30	December 15	New Jersey	1–3	Detroit		Vernon	19,983	21–7–2	44	W
31	December 20	Detroit	6–1	Anaheim		Vernon	17,174	22–7–2	46	W
32	December 22	Detroit	5–1	Calgary		Osgood	17,302	23–7–2	48	W
33	December 23	Detroit	1–0	Vancouver		Vernon	18,422	24–7–2	50	W
34	December 26	St. Louis	2–3	Detroit		Osgood	19,983	25–7–2	52	W
35	December 29	Detroit	2–1	Dallas		Osgood	16,924	26–7–2	54	W
36	December 31	Hartford	2–3	Detroit		Osgood	19,983	27–7–2	56	W

January: 8–2–2 (home: 5–1–1; road: 3–1–1)

Game	Date	Visitor	Score	Home	OT	Decision	Attendance	Record	Points	Recap
37	January 3	Dallas	3–3	Detroit	OT	Osgood	19,944	27–7–3	57	T
38	January 5	Detroit	2–5	Pittsburgh		Osgood	17,181	27–8–3	57	L
39	January 6	Chicago	0–3	Detroit		Hodson	19,983	28–8–3	59	W
40	January 8	Winnipeg	6–4	Detroit		Osgood	19,825	28–9–3	59	L
41	January 10	Detroit	4–0	Dallas		Osgood	15,621	29–9–3	61	W
42	January 12	Los Angeles	2–3	Detroit		Hodson	19,983	30–9–3	63	W
43	January 13	Detroit	4–2	Washington		Osgood	18,130	31–9–3	65	W
44	January 17	Colorado	2–3	Detroit		Osgood	19,983	32–9–3	67	W
45	January 24	San Jose	2–4	Detroit		Osgood	19,946	33–9–3	69	W
46	January 25	Detroit	4–2	Ottawa		Osgood	16,882	34–9–3	71	W
47	January 27	Detroit	5–5	Chicago	OT	Osgood	22,640	34–9–4	72	T
48	January 30	Toronto	2–4	Detroit		Osgood	19,983	35–9–4	74	W

February: 11–2–0 (home: 8–0–0; road: 3–2–0)

Game	Date	Visitor	Score	Home	OT	Decision	Attendance	Record	Points	Recap
49	February 3	Pittsburgh	0–3	Detroit		Osgood	19,983	36–9–4	76	W
50	February 6	Florida	2–4	Detroit		Osgood	19,983	37–9–4	78	W
51	February 8	Detroit	1–3	Florida		Vernon	14,703	37–10–4	78	L
52	February 10	Detroit	3–2	Tampa Bay	OT	Osgood	22,636	38–10–4	80	W
53	February 13	Los Angeles	4–9	Detroit		Vernon	19,983	39–10–4	82	W
54	February 15	Washington	3–4	Detroit		Osgood	19,952	40–10–4	84	W
55	February 16	Detroit	3–4	St. Louis		Vernon	20,156	40–11–4	84	L
56	February 18	Detroit	3–2	Toronto		Osgood	15,746	41–11–4	86	W
57	February 19	Vancouver	3–4	Detroit		Vernon	19,983	42–11–4	88	W
58	February 22	Toronto	3–5	Detroit		Osgood	19,983	43–11–4	90	W
59	February 24	Tampa Bay	0–2	Detroit		Vernon	19,983	44–11–4	92	W
60	February 27	Detroit	6–2	NY Islanders		Osgood	11,762	45–11–4	94	W
61	February 29	NY Islanders	1–5	Detroit		Osgood	19,983	46–11–4	96	W

March: 12–1–1 (home: 7–1–0; road: 5–0–1)

Game	Date	Visitor	Score	Home	OT	Decision	Attendance	Record	Points	Recap
62	March 2	Vancouver	3–2	Detroit		Vernon	19,983	46–12–4	96	L
63	March 3	Detroit	6–2	Chicago		Vernon	22,540	47–12–4	98	W
64	March 6	Detroit	4–2	Hartford		Osgood	11,252	48–12–4	100	W
65	March 8	Detroit	4–2	Colorado		Vernon	16,061	49–12–4	102	W
66	March 10	Detroit	5–2	Winnipeg		Osgood	14,757	50–12–4	104	W
67	March 12	Winnipeg	2–5	Detroit		Vernon	19,983	51–12–4	106	W
68	March 17	Calgary	2–4	Detroit		Osgood	19,983	52–12–4	108	W
69	March 19	Toronto	5–6	Detroit		Vernon	19,983	53–12–4	110	W
70	March 20	Detroit	4–3	Toronto	OT	Osgood	15,746	54–12–4	112	W
71	March 22	Colorado	0–7	Detroit		Vernon	19,983	55–12–4	114	W
72	March 24	Detroit	2–2	St. Louis	OT	Osgood	20,708	55–12–5	115	T
73	March 25	Anaheim	1–5	Detroit		Vernon	19,983	56–12–5	117	W
74	March 27	Buffalo	2–4	Detroit		Osgood	19,983	57–12–5	119	W
75	March 31	St. Louis	1–8	Detroit		Vernon	19,983	58–12–5	121	W

April: 4–1–2 (home: 2–0–0; road: 2–1–2)

Game	Date	Visitor	Score	Home	OT	Decision	Attendance	Record	Points	Recap
76	April 2	Detroit	3–6	San Jose		Osgood	17,190	58–13–5	121	L
77	April 3	Detroit	2–2	Los Angeles	OT	Vernon	14,663	58–13–6	122	T
78	April 5	Detroit	2–2	Anaheim	OT	Osgood	17,174	58–13–7	123	T
79	April 7	Detroit	4–1	Chicago		Vernon	21,986	59–13–7	125	W
80	April 10	Winnipeg	2–5	Detroit		Osgood	19,983	60–13–7	127	W
81	April 12	Chicago	3–5	Detroit		Osgood	19,983	61–13–7	129	W
82	April 14	Detroit	5–1	Dallas		Osgood	16,924	62–13–7	131	W

Legend: W Win (2 points) L Loss (0 points) T Tie (1 point)

=== Playoffs ===
1996 Stanley Cup playoffs
Western Conference Quarterfinals vs. (8) Winnipeg Jets: Detroit won 4–2

Game	Date	Visitor	Score	Home	OT	Decision	Attendance	Series	Recap
1	April 17	Winnipeg	1–4	Detroit		Osgood	19,983	1–0	W
2	April 19	Winnipeg	0–4	Detroit		Osgood	19,983	2–0	W
3	April 21	Detroit	1–4	Winnipeg		Vernon	15,544	2–1	L
4	April 23	Detroit	6–1	Winnipeg		Vernon	15,557	3–1	W
5	April 26	Winnipeg	3–1	Detroit		Osgood	19,983	3–2	L
6	April 28	Detroit	4–1	Winnipeg		Vernon	15,567	4–2	W

Western Conference Semifinals vs. (5) St. Louis Blues: Detroit won 4–3

Game	Date	Visitor	Score	Home	OT	Decision	Attendance	Series	Recap
1	May 3	St. Louis	2–3	Detroit		Osgood	19,983	1–0	W
2	May 5	St. Louis	3–8	Detroit		Osgood	19,983	2–0	W
3	May 8	Detroit	4–5	St. Louis	OT	Vernon	20,796	2–1	L
4	May 10	Detroit	0–1	St. Louis		Osgood	20,796	2–2	L
5	May 12	St. Louis	3–2	Detroit		Osgood	19,983	2–3	L
6	May 14	Detroit	4–2	St. Louis		Osgood	20,796	3–3	W
7	May 16	St. Louis	0–1	Detroit	2OT	Osgood	19,983	4–3	W

Western Conference Finals vs. (2) Colorado Avalanche: Colorado won 4–2

Game	Date	Visitor	Score	Home	OT	Decision	Attendance	Series	Recap
1	May 19	Colorado	3–2	Detroit	OT	Osgood	19,957	0–1	L
2	May 21	Colorado	3–0	Detroit		Osgood	19,983	0–2	L
3	May 23	Detroit	6–4	Colorado		Osgood	16,061	1–2	W
4	May 25	Detroit	2–4	Colorado		Osgood	16,061	1–3	L
5	May 27	Colorado	2–5	Detroit		Osgood	19,983	2–3	W
6	May 29	Detroit	1–4	Colorado		Osgood	16,061	2–4	L

Legend: W Win L Loss

== Player statistics ==
=== Scoring ===
- Position abbreviations: C = Center; D = Defense; G = Goaltender; LW = Left wing; RW = Right wing
- † = Joined team via a transaction (e.g., trade, waivers, signing) during the season. Stats reflect time with the Red Wings only.
- ‡ = Left team via a transaction (e.g., trade, waivers, release) during the season. Stats reflect time with the Red Wings only.

No.	Player	Pos	Regular season						Playoffs					
No.	Player	Pos	GP	G	A	Pts	+/-	PIM	GP	G	A	Pts	+/-	PIM
91	Sergei Fedorov	RW	78	39	68	107	49	48	19	2	18	20	8	10
19	Steve Yzerman	C	80	36	59	95	29	64	18	8	12	20	−1	4
77	Paul Coffey	D	76	14	60	74	19	90	17	5	9	14	−3	30
13	Vyacheslav Kozlov	LW	82	36	37	73	33	70	19	5	7	12	3	10
8	Igor Larionov†	C	69	21	50	71	37	34	19	6	7	13	5	6
5	Nicklas Lidstrom	D	81	17	50	67	29	20	19	5	9	14	2	10
55	Keith Primeau	C	74	27	25	52	19	168	17	1	4	5	−1	28
22	Dino Ciccarelli	RW	64	22	21	43	14	99	17	6	2	8	−6	26
2	Viacheslav Fetisov	D	69	7	35	42	37	96	19	1	4	5	3	34
23	Greg Johnson	LW	60	18	22	40	6	30	13	3	1	4	−3	8
16	Vladimir Konstantinov	D	81	14	20	34	60	139	19	4	5	9	4	28
21	Bob Errey	LW	71	11	21	32	30	66	14	0	4	4	1	8
25	Darren McCarty	RW	63	15	14	29	14	158	19	3	2	5	−2	20
17	Doug Brown	LW	62	12	15	27	11	4	13	3	3	6	0	4
37	Tim Taylor	C	72	11	14	25	11	39	18	0	4	4	0	4
33	Kris Draper	C	52	7	9	16	2	32	18	4	2	6	2	18
11	Mathieu Dandenault	RW	34	5	7	12	6	6	—	—	—	—	—	—
27	Marc Bergevin	D	70	1	9	10	7	33	17	1	0	1	−4	14
20	Martin Lapointe	RW	58	6	3	9	0	93	11	1	2	3	2	12
15	Mike Ramsey	D	47	2	4	6	17	35	14	0	4	4	1	10
3	Bob Rouse	D	58	0	6	6	5	48	7	0	1	1	4	4
26	Ray Sheppard‡	RW	5	2	2	4	0	2	—	—	—	—	—	—
30	Chris Osgood	G	50	1	2	3		4	15	0	0	0		4
18	Kirk Maltby†	RW	6	1	0	1	0	6	8	0	1	1	0	4
32	Stu Grimson	LW	56	0	1	1	−10	128	2	0	0	0	0	0
4	Jamie Pushor	D	5	0	1	1	2	17	—	—	—	—	—	—
34	Anders Eriksson	D	1	0	0	0	1	2	3	0	0	0	2	0
31	Kevin Hodson	G	4	0	0	0		0	—	—	—	—	—	—
29	Mike Vernon	G	32	0	0	0		2	4	0	0	0		2
26	Wes Walz	C	2	0	0	0	0	0	—	—	—	—	—	—

=== Goaltending ===
No.	Player	Regular season											Playoffs									
No.	Player	GP	GS	W	L	T	SA	GA	GAA	SV%	SO	TOI	GP	GS	W	L	SA	GA	GAA	SV%	SO	TOI
30	Chris Osgood	50	47	39	6	5	1,190	106	2.17	.911	5	2,932:59	15	15	8	7	322	33	2.12	.898	2	935:48
29	Mike Vernon	32	22	21	7	2	723	70	2.26	.903	3	1,854:43	4	4	2	2	81	11	2.71	.864	0	243:23
31	Kevin Hodson	4	3	2	0	0	67	3	1.10	.955	1	163:16	—	—	—	—	—	—	—	—	—	—

== Awards and records ==
=== Awards ===
Type	Award/honor	Recipient	Ref
League (annual)	Frank J. Selke Memorial Trophy	Sergei Fedorov	
League (annual)	Jack Adams Trophy	Scotty Bowman	
League (annual)	NHL Second All-Star team	Vladimir Konstantinov (Defense)	
League (annual)	NHL Second All-Star team	Chris Osgood (Goaltender)	
League (annual)	NHL Plus-Minus Award	Vladimir Konstantinov	
League (annual)	William M. Jennings Trophy	Chris Osgood	
League (annual)	William M. Jennings Trophy	Mike Vernon	
League (in-season)	NHL All-Star Game selection	Scotty Bowman (coach)	
League (in-season)	NHL All-Star Game selection	Paul Coffey (Note: Coffey was voted to the starting lineup, earning more votes than any other player.)	
League (in-season)	NHL All-Star Game selection	Sergei Fedorov	
League (in-season)	NHL All-Star Game selection	Nicklas Lidstrom	
League (in-season)	NHL All-Star Game selection	Chris Osgood	

=== Milestones ===
Milestone	Player	Date	Ref
First game	Mathieu Dandenault	October 8, 1995	
First game	Jamie Pushor	October 8, 1995	
First game	Kevin Hodson	January 5, 1996	
First game	Anders Eriksson	April 14, 1996	
500th game played	Mike Vernon	October 9, 1995	

== Transactions ==
=== Trades ===
Date	Details	
August 17, 1995	To Tampa Bay Lightning Shawn Burr; 1996 3rd-round pick (#80 overall)	To Detroit Red Wings Marc Bergevin; Ben Hankinson
October 24, 1995	To San Jose Sharks Ray Sheppard	To Detroit Red Wings Igor Larionov; 1998 conditional pick
March 20, 1996	To Edmonton Oilers Dan McGillis	To Detroit Red Wings Kirk Maltby

=== Free agents ===
Date	Player	Team
June 26, 1995	Mark Major	from Boston Bruins
July 18, 1995	Jeff Daniels	to Hartford Whalers
August 8, 1995	Chris Govedaris	to Winnipeg Jets
August 8, 1995	Terry Carkner	to Florida Panthers
August 29, 1995	Dave Chyzowski	
September 5, 1995	Wes Walz	from Calgary Flames
September 20, 1995	Mike Needham	
October 11, 1995	Sergei Bautin	to San Jose Sharks

=== Signings ===
Date	Player	Contract term
August 28, 1995	Mike Ramsey	1-year
September 7, 1995	Viacheslav Fetisov	1-year

== Draft picks ==
Detroit's draft picks at the 1995 NHL entry draft held at the Edmonton Coliseum in Edmonton, Alberta.

Round	#	Player	Pos	Nationality	College/Junior/Club team (League)
1	26	Maxim Kuznetsov	D	Russia	Dynamo Moscow (Russia)
2	52	Philippe Audet	LW	Canada	Granby Bisons (QMJHL)
3^{1}	58	Darryl Laplante	C	Canada	Moose Jaw Warriors (WHL)
4	104	Anatoli Ustyugov	LW	Russia	Torpedo Yaroslavl (Russia)
5^{2}	125	Chad Wilchynski	D	Canada	Regina Pats (WHL)
5^{3}	126	Dave Arsenault	G	Canada	Drummondville Voltigeurs (QMJHL)
6	156	Tyler Perry	C	Canada	Seattle Thunderbirds (WHL)
7	182	Per Eklund	RW	Sweden	Djurgardens IF (Sweden)
8	208	Andrei Samokhvalov	RW	Kazakhstan	Torpedo Ust-Kamenogorsk (Kazakhstan)
9	234	David Engblom	C	Sweden	Vallentuna (Sweden)

Notes

1. The Red Wings acquired this pick as the result of a trade on May 25, 1994 that sent Sheldon Kennedy to Winnipeg in exchange for this pick.
2. The Red Wings acquired this pick as the result of a trade on January 17, 1994 that sent Vincent Riendeau to Boston in exchange for this pick.
3. The Red Wings acquired this pick as the result of a trade on September 9, 1993 that sent Stewart Malgunas to Philadelphia in exchange for this pick.
- The Red Wings third-round pick went to the New Jersey Devils as the result of a trade on April 3, 1995 that sent Viacheslav Fetisov to Detroit in exchange for this pick (78th overall).
- The Red Wings fifth-round pick went to the San Jose Sharks as the result of a trade on February 27, 1995 that sent Bob Errey to Detroit in exchange for this pick (130th overall).
