= 1995–96 Ottawa Senators season =

NHL hockey team season

1995–96 Ottawa Senators
- Division: 6th Northeast
- Conference: 13th Eastern
- 1995–96 record: 18–59–5
- Home record: 8–28–5
- Road record: 10–31–0
- Goals for: 191
- Goals against: 291

Team information
- General manager: Randy Sexton (Oct.–Dec.); Pierre Gauthier (Dec.–Apr.)
- Coach: Rick Bowness (Oct.–Nov.); Dave Allison (Nov.–Jan.); Jacques Martin (Jan.–Apr.)
- Captain: Randy Cunneyworth
- Alternate captains: Steve Duchesne; Tom Chorske
- Arena: Ottawa Civic Centre (Oct.–Dec.); The Palladium (Note: Renamed during season to Corel Centre.) (Jan.–Apr.)
- Average attendance: 13,252 (2 arenas combined)
- Minor league affiliates: Prince Edward Island Senators; Thunder Bay Senators

Team leaders
- Goals: Daniel Alfredsson (26)
- Assists: Daniel Alfredsson (35)
- Points: Daniel Alfredsson (61)
- Penalty minutes: Dennis Vial (276)
- Plus/minus: Pat Elyniuk (+2)
- Wins: Damian Rhodes (10)
- Goals against average: Damian Rhodes (2.77)

The 1995–96 Ottawa Senators season was the fourth season of the Ottawa Senators of the National Hockey League (NHL). This season was plenty of change for the club. The club changed coaching staffs twice, changed their general manager and moved into the new Palladium arena in Kanata. The team again finished last in the league, even though they knocked the defending Stanley Cup champion New Jersey Devils out of playoff contention in the last game of the season, allowing the Tampa Bay Lightning to clinch the playoff berth at the expense of the Devils.

== Offseason ==
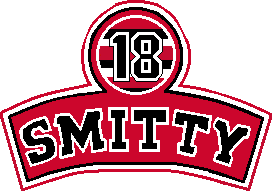
'Smitty' patch worn during the season

Prior to the season, on August 2, 1995, Brian Smith, former NHL hockey player and sportscaster at Ottawa TV station CJOH-TV was killed. He had been the primary reporter on the Senators for the station. The Senators honored him with a patch on their jerseys, with his nickname 'Smitty' and number 18, which they wore on their jerseys for the whole season. The team raised a banner in his memory.

== Regular season ==
Northeast Division teams

The Senators finished last in wins (18), points (41), goals scored (191), even-strength goals scored (132), power-play goals scored (53) and power-play percentage (12.33%). They also tied the New York Rangers and the Tampa Bay Lightning for fewest short-handed goals scored (6).

There were some bright spots during the season, rookie Daniel Alfredsson led the team offensively with 61 points (26 goals-35 assists), while Alexei Yashin was out of the lineup for 36 games. Alfredsson won the Calder Memorial Trophy, awarded to the NHL's rookie of the year.

After getting off to a good start with a 6–5–0 record, the Senators lost their next eight games, which ended up costing head coach Rick Bowness his job, as the club replaced him with Dave Allison, who was previously the head coach of the Senators AHL affiliate, the Prince Edward Island Senators. The Dave Allison era did not last long in Ottawa, as the club won two of 25 games (2–22–1) before he was replaced by Jacques Martin. Under Martin, the Senators was more competitive, going 10–24–4 in his 38 games to finish the year with an 18–59–5, their fourth straight season at the bottom of the NHL standings.

=== Highlights ===
After taking over from the fired Randy Sexton as General Manager, on December 6, 1995, Pierre Gauthier made three moves to strengthen the club. He hired Jacques Martin as head coach, signed hold-out Alexei Yashin to a contract and engineered a blockbuster trade on January 23, 1996, dealing away Don Beaupre, Martin Straka, and Bryan Berard, while acquiring Damian Rhodes and Wade Redden. It was a three-way trade between the Senators, the Toronto Maple Leafs, and the New York Islanders and was necessary because Berard, the Senators' first-round pick, was refusing to report to the Senators.

The Senators left the Ottawa Civic Centre and played their first game in The Palladium on January 17, 1996, against the Montreal Canadiens. The raising of the Senators' Stanley Cup banners failed, leaving the banners obscuring some fans' view of the scoreboard. The Senators lost 3–0 to the Canadiens.

On April 13, 1996, the Senators played the defending Stanley Cup champion New Jersey Devils, who must win to clinch the final playoff spot in the Eastern Conference. The Senators played the role of spoiler, defeating New Jersey 5–2, officially eliminating the Devils from post-season play and giving the Tampa Bay Lightning, the team that entered the league the same year as the Senators, its first playoff berth.

=== Final standings ===
Northeast Division
No.		GP	W	L	T	GF	GA	PTS
1	**Pittsburgh Penguins**	82	49	29	4	362	284	102
2	**Boston Bruins**	82	40	31	11	282	269	91
3	**Montreal Canadiens**	82	40	32	10	265	248	90
4	Hartford Whalers	82	34	39	9	237	259	77
5	Buffalo Sabres	82	33	42	7	247	262	72
6	Ottawa Senators	82	18	59	5	191	291	41

Eastern Conference
R		Div	GP	W	L	T	GF	GA	Pts
**1**	**Philadelphia Flyers**	**ATL**	**82**	**45**	**24**	**13**	**282**	**208**	**103**
**2**	**Pittsburgh Penguins**	**NE**	**82**	**49**	**29**	**4**	**362**	**284**	**102**
**3**	**New York Rangers**	**ATL**	**82**	**41**	**27**	**14**	**272**	**237**	**96**
**4**	**Florida Panthers**	**ATL**	**82**	**41**	**31**	**10**	**254**	**234**	**92**
**5**	**Boston Bruins**	**NE**	**82**	**40**	**31**	**11**	**282**	**269**	**91**
**6**	**Montreal Canadiens**	**NE**	**82**	**40**	**32**	**10**	**265**	**248**	**90**
**7**	**Washington Capitals**	**ATL**	**82**	**39**	**32**	**11**	**234**	**204**	**89**
**8**	**Tampa Bay Lightning**	**ATL**	**82**	**38**	**32**	**12**	**238**	**248**	**88**
9	New Jersey Devils	ATL	82	37	33	12	215	202	86
10	Hartford Whalers	NE	82	34	39	9	237	259	77
11	Buffalo Sabres	NE	82	33	42	7	247	262	73
12	New York Islanders	ATL	82	22	50	10	229	315	54
13	Ottawa Senators	NE	82	18	59	5	191	291	41

Divisions: ATL – Atlantic, NE – Northeast

bold – Qualified for playoffs

== Schedule and results ==
1995–96 regular season
October: 5–5–0 (home: 2–2–0; road: 3–3–0)

Game	Date	Score	Opponent	Record	Attendance	Recap
1	October 7, 1995	1–3	Buffalo Sabres (1995–96)	0–1–0	9,567	L
2	October 13, 1995	2–6	@ Florida Panthers (1995–96)	0–2–0	10,895	L
3	October 15, 1995	7–4	@ Tampa Bay Lightning (1995–96)	1–2–0	13,488	W
4	October 19, 1995	4–2	Calgary Flames (1995–96)	2–2–0	8,424	W
5	October 21, 1995	1–4	@ New Jersey Devils (1995–96)	2–3–0	17,620	L
6	October 22, 1995	4–2	@ New York Rangers (1995–96)	3–3–0	18,200	W
7	October 24, 1995	2–1	@ Detroit Red Wings (1995–96)	4–3–0	19,512	W
8	October 26, 1995	5–4	Los Angeles Kings (1995–96)	5–3–0	10,575	W
9	October 28, 1995	1–4	Florida Panthers (1995–96)	5–4–0	8,660	L
10	October 29, 1995	2–5	@ Philadelphia Flyers (1995–96)	5–5–0	17,328	L

November: 1–11–1 (home: 0–5–1; road: 1–6–0)

Game	Date	Score	Opponent	Record	Attendance	Recap
11	November 2, 1995	5–0	@ Hartford Whalers (1995–96)	6–5–0	10,458	W
12	November 4, 1995	4–5	Hartford Whalers (1995–96)	6–6–0	8,794	L
13	November 8, 1995	1–7	Pittsburgh Penguins (1995–96)	6–7–0	10,137	L
14	November 9, 1995	3–4	@ Boston Bruins (1995–96)	6–8–0	17,261	L
15	November 11, 1995	2–3	Mighty Ducks of Anaheim (1995–96)	6–9–0	8,988	L
16	November 15, 1995	2–3	@ Hartford Whalers (1995–96)	6–10–0	7,641	L
17	November 16, 1995	3–5	@ Philadelphia Flyers (1995–96)	6–11–0	17,220	L
18	November 18, 1995	1–5	@ Montreal Canadiens (1995–96)	6–12–0	17,302	L
19	November 19, 1995	0–6	@ Buffalo Sabres (1995–96)	6–13–0	10,697	L
20	November 22, 1995	1–3	Winnipeg Jets (1995–96)	6–14–0	8,426	L
21	November 25, 1995	3–3 OT	Boston Bruins (1995–96)	6–14–1	9,419	T
22	November 28, 1995	2–7	@ Pittsburgh Penguins (1995–96)	6–15–1	16,162	L
23	November 30, 1995	3–5	New York Islanders (1995–96)	6–16–1	8,167	L

December: 2–12–0 (home: 0–5–0; road: 2–7–0)

Game	Date	Score	Opponent	Record	Attendance	Recap
24	December 2, 1995	2–4	New York Rangers (1995–96)	6–17–1	8,194	L
25	December 5, 1995	1–4	@ Toronto Maple Leafs (1995–96)	6–18–1	15,746	L
26	December 7, 1995	5–2	@ Chicago Blackhawks (1995–96)	7–18–1	17,552	W
27	December 9, 1995	3–7	Colorado Avalanche (1995–96)	7–19–1	9,169	L
28	December 12, 1995	1–2	@ San Jose Sharks (1995–96)	7–20–1	17,190	L
29	December 13, 1995	2–6	@ Los Angeles Kings (1995–96)	7–21–1	11,221	L
30	December 15, 1995	2–4	@ Mighty Ducks of Anaheim (1995–96)	7–22–1	17,174	L
31	December 17, 1995	1–4	@ Vancouver Canucks (1995–96)	7–23–1	16,006	L
32	December 18, 1995	1–3	@ Edmonton Oilers (1995–96)	7–24–1	8,419	L
33	December 23, 1995	2–4	Buffalo Sabres (1995–96)	7–25–1	8,615	L
34	December 26, 1995	4–6	@ New York Rangers (1995–96)	7–26–1	18,200	L
35	December 27, 1995	4–3	@ Buffalo Sabres (1995–96)	8–26–1	12,175	W
36	December 30, 1995	1–4	Montreal Canadiens (1995–96)	8–27–1	10,575	L
37	December 31, 1995	0–3	Tampa Bay Lightning (1995–96)	8–28–1	8,522	L

January: 1–10–1 (home: 1–5–1; road: 0–5–0)

Game	Date	Score	Opponent	Record	Attendance	Recap
38	January 3, 1996	1–4	@ Pittsburgh Penguins (1995–96)	8–29–1	15,632	L
39	January 5, 1996	2–4	@ Hartford Whalers (1995–96)	8–30–1	12,239	L
40	January 6, 1996	4–5	@ New York Islanders (1995–96)	8–31–1	12,175	L
41	January 11, 1996	1–6	@ Washington Capitals (1995–96)	8–32–1	11,511	L
42	January 13, 1996	1–4	@ Tampa Bay Lightning (1995–96)	8–33–1	21,829	L
43	January 17, 1996	0–3	Montreal Canadiens (1995–96)	8–34–1	18,500	L
44	January 22, 1996	3–7	Chicago Blackhawks (1995–96)	8–35–1	13,872	L
45	January 24, 1996	3–4	Pittsburgh Penguins (1995–96)	8–36–1	17,149	L
46	January 25, 1996	2–4	Detroit Red Wings (1995–96)	8–37–1	16,882	L
47	January 27, 1996	2–2 OT	Toronto Maple Leafs (1995–96)	8–37–2	18,500	T
48	January 29, 1996	4–2	St. Louis Blues (1995–96)	9–37–2	13,125	W
49	January 31, 1996	1–3	Boston Bruins (1995–96)	9–38–2	15,795	L

February: 3–8–1 (home: 0–4–1; road: 3–4–0)

Game	Date	Score	Opponent	Record	Attendance	Recap
50	February 1, 1996	2–4	Washington Capitals (1995–96)	9–39–2	12,322	L
51	February 3, 1996	2–3 OT	New Jersey Devils (1995–96)	9–40–2	18,280	L
52	February 6, 1996	1–3	@ Calgary Flames (1995–96)	9–41–2	16,442	L
53	February 8, 1996	2–6	@ Winnipeg Jets (1995–96)	9–42–2	8,673	L
54	February 10, 1996	5–3	@ Montreal Canadiens (1995–96)	10–42–2	17,535	W
55	February 12, 1996	4–1	@ New York Islanders (1995–96)	11–42–2	7,567	W
56	February 15, 1996	2–2 OT	San Jose Sharks (1995–96)	11–42–3	13,556	T
57	February 17, 1996	1–2 OT	New York Rangers (1995–96)	11–43–3	18,500	L
58	February 20, 1996	7–1	@ St. Louis Blues (1995–96)	12–43–3	19,736	W
59	February 22, 1996	2–3	@ Dallas Stars (1995–96)	12–44–3	14,818	L
60	February 25, 1996	2–4	@ Colorado Avalanche (1995–96)	12–45–3	16,061	L
61	February 28, 1996	2–3 OT	Buffalo Sabres (1995–96)	12–46–3	13,419	L

March: 3–10–1 (home: 3–5–1; road: 0–5–0)

Game	Date	Score	Opponent	Record	Attendance	Recap
62	March 1, 1996	2–3	Philadelphia Flyers (1995–96)	12–47–3	18,500	L
63	March 2, 1996	1–4	New Jersey Devils (1995–96)	12–48–3	15,510	L
64	March 7, 1996	1–5	@ Pittsburgh Penguins (1995–96)	12–49–3	13,377	L
65	March 9, 1996	2–3	@ Montreal Canadiens (1995–96)	12–50–3	17,959	L
66	March 13, 1996	4–1	Dallas Stars (1995–96)	13–50–3	13,226	W
67	March 15, 1996	2–0	Vancouver Canucks (1995–96)	14–50–3	17,850	W
68	March 17, 1996	5–0	Tampa Bay Lightning (1995–96)	15–50–3	15,102	W
69	March 19, 1996	2–5	@ Florida Panthers (1995–96)	15–51–3	12,255	L
70	March 21, 1996	1–3	@ Boston Bruins (1995–96)	15–52–3	17,565	L
71	March 22, 1996	1–1 OT	Hartford Whalers (1995–96)	15–52–4	13,596	T
72	March 24, 1996	2–3	Edmonton Oilers (1995–96)	15–53–4	13,188	L
73	March 27, 1996	2–4	Philadelphia Flyers (1995–96)	15–54–4	15,183	L
74	March 29, 1996	0–5	@ Washington Capitals (1995–96)	15–55–4	18,130	L
75	March 30, 1996	1–3	Montreal Canadiens (1995–96)	15–56–4	18,500	L

April: 3–3–1 (home: 2–2–1; road: 1–1–0)

Game	Date	Score	Opponent	Record	Attendance	Recap
76	April 1, 1996	1–1 OT	Boston Bruins (1995–96)	15–56–5	13,335	T
77	April 3, 1996	3–2	Florida Panthers (1995–96)	16–56–5	13,074	W
78	April 5, 1996	4–2	New York Islanders (1995–96)	17–56–5	16,541	W
79	April 6, 1996	3–4	Washington Capitals (1995–96)	17–57–5	15,101	L
80	April 10, 1996	2–5	@ Buffalo Sabres (1995–96)	17–58–5	15,111	L
81	April 11, 1996	3–5	Pittsburgh Penguins (1995–96)	17–59–5	18,500	L
82	April 13, 1996	5–2	@ New Jersey Devils (1995–96)	18–59–5	19,040	W

Legend: W Win (2 points) L Loss (0 points) T Tie (1 point)

== Player statistics ==
=== Scoring ===
- Position abbreviations: C = Centre; D = Defence; G = Goaltender; LW = Left wing; RW = Right wing
- † = Joined team via a transaction (e.g., trade, waivers, signing) during the season. Stats reflect time with the Senators only.
- ‡ = Left team via a transaction (e.g., trade, waivers, release) during the season. Stats reflect time with the Senators only.

No.	Player	Pos	Regular season					
No.	Player	Pos	GP	G	A	Pts	+/-	PIM
11	Daniel Alfredsson	RW	82	26	35	61	−18	28
19	Alexei Yashin	C	46	15	24	39	−15	28
7	Randy Cunneyworth	LW	81	17	19	36	−31	130
28	Steve Duchesne	D	62	12	24	36	−23	42
76	Radek Bonk	C	76	16	19	35	−5	36
17	Tom Chorske	LW	72	15	14	29	−9	21
82	Martin Straka‡	C	43	9	16	25	−14	29
9	Dan Quinn‡	C	28	6	18	24	−8	24
4	Sean Hill	D	80	7	14	21	−26	94
23	Jaroslav Modry‡	D	64	4	14	18	−17	38
78	Pavol Demitra	LW	31	7	10	17	−3	6
91	Alexandre Daigle	C	50	5	12	17	−30	24
13	Ted Drury	C	42	9	7	16	−19	54
22	Antti Tormanen	RW	50	7	8	15	−15	28
5	Kerry Huffman‡	D	43	4	11	15	−18	63
20	Trent McCleary	RW	75	4	10	14	−15	68
10	Rob Gaudreau	RW	52	8	5	13	−19	15
94	Stan Neckar	D	82	3	9	12	−16	54
12	Dave Archibald	C	44	6	4	10	−14	18
49	Michel Picard	LW	17	2	6	8	−1	10
2	Lance Pitlick	D	28	1	6	7	−8	20
36	Troy Mallette	LW	64	2	3	5	−7	171
21	Dennis Vial	D	64	1	4	5	−13	276
3	Frank Musil	D	65	1	3	4	−10	85
25	Pat Elynuik	RW	29	1	2	3	2	16
29	Phil Bourque	LW	13	1	1	2	−3	14
6	Chris Dahlquist	D	24	1	1	2	−7	14
14	Jean-Yves Roy	RW	4	1	1	2	3	2
33	Don Beaupre‡	G	33	0	2	2		17
27	Janne Laukkanen†	D	20	0	2	2	0	14
26	Scott Levins	RW	27	0	2	2	−3	80
1	Damian Rhodes†	G	36	0	2	2		4
16	Dave McLlwain‡	RW	1	0	1	1	0	2
35	Mike Bales	G	20	0	0	0		2
27	Joe Cirella†‡	D	6	0	0	0	−3	4
24	Daniel Laperriere	D	6	0	0	0	2	4
18	Patrick Traverse	D	5	0	0	0	−1	2

=== Goaltending ===
- † = Joined team via a transaction (e.g., trade, waivers, signing) during the season. Stats reflect time with the Senators only.
- ‡ = Left team via a transaction (e.g., trade, waivers, release) during the season. Stats reflect time with the Senators only.

No.	Player	Regular season									
No.	Player	GP	W	L	T	SA	GA	GAA	SV%	SO	TOI
1	Damian Rhodes†	36	10	22	4	1041	98	2.77	.906	2	2123
33	Don Beaupre‡	33	6	23	0	892	110	3.73	.877	1	1770
35	Mike Bales	20	2	14	1	560	72	4.15	.871	0	1040

== Awards and records ==
=== Awards ===
Type	Award/honour	Recipient	Ref
League (annual)	Calder Memorial Trophy	Daniel Alfredsson	
League (annual)	NHL All-Rookie Team	Daniel Alfredsson (Forward)	
League (in-season)	NHL All-Star Game selection	Daniel Alfredsson	
League (in-season)	NHL Rookie of the Month	Daniel Alfredsson (November)	
League (in-season)	NHL Rookie of the Month	Daniel Alfredsson (April)	
Team	Molson Cup	Damian Rhodes	

=== Milestones ===
Milestone	Player	Date	Ref
First game	Daniel Alfredsson	October 7, 1995	
First game	Trent McCleary	October 7, 1995	
First game	Antti Tormanen	October 7, 1995	
First game	Patrick Traverse	December 30, 1995	

== Transactions ==
=== July 1995 ===
July 8	Acquired Jaroslav Modrý from the New Jersey Devils for a 4th round pick in the 1995 NHL entry draft - (Alyn McCauley).
July 31	Lost free agent Darren Rumble to the Philadelphia Flyers to a 1-year, $300,000 contract.

=== August 1995 ===
August 1	Signed free agent Dan Quinn from the Los Angeles Kings to a 2-year, $1.05 mil contract.
August 4	Acquired Steve Duchesne from the St. Louis Blues for a 2nd round pick in the 1996 NHL entry draft - (Cory Sarich).
August 7	Lost free agent Corey Foster to the Pittsburgh Penguins to a 1-year contract.
August 9	Signed free agent Eric Lavigne from the Los Angeles Kings to a 1-year contract.

=== September 1995 ===
September 20	Traded Jean-François Labbé to the Colorado Avalanche for future considerations.

=== October 1995 ===
October 2	Claimed Justin Hocking from the Los Angeles Kings in the 1995 NHL Waiver Draft. Claimed Ted Drury from the Colorado Avalanche in the 1995 NHL Waiver Draft.
October 4	Claimed Tom Chorske off of waivers from the New Jersey Devils.
October 5	Acquired Jean-Yves Roy from the New York Rangers for Steve Larouche. New Jersey Devils received 3rd round draft pick in 1997 NHL entry draft - (Josh Langfeld for waiver draft payment for Tom Chorske.
October 7	Acquired Frank Musil from the Calgary Flames for a 4th round pick in the 1997 NHL entry draft - (Chris St. Croix).
October 10	Signed free agent Joe Cirella from the Florida Panthers to a 1-year, $150,000 (CAD) contract.
October 13	Resigned Frank Musil to a 1-year, $500,000 contract.

=== December 1995 ===
December 1	Released Joe Cirella.
December 31	Re-signed Alexei Yashin to a 5-year, $13.6 million contract.

=== January 1996 ===
January 23	Traded Dan Quinn to the Philadelphia Flyers for cash. Acquired Damian Rhodes from the Toronto Maple Leafs and Wade Redden from the New York Islanders for Martin Straka and Bryan Berard to the New York Islanders and Don Beaupre to the Toronto Maple Leafs as part of three-team trade.
January 25	Acquired Janne Laukkanen from the Colorado Avalanche for the rights to Brad Larsen.

=== March 1996 ===
March 1	Acquired an 8th round pick in the 1996 NHL entry draft - (Erich Goldmann) from the Pittsburgh Penguins for Dave McLlwain.
March 19	Acquired an 9th round pick in the 1996 NHL entry draft - (Sami Salo) from the Philadelphia Flyers for Kerry Huffman.
March 20	Acquired Kevin Brown from the Los Angeles Kings for Jaroslav Modrý and an 8th round pick in the 1996 NHL entry draft - (Steve Valiquette).

== Draft picks ==
Ottawa's draft picks at the 1995 NHL entry draft in Edmonton, Alberta.

Round	#	Player	Nationality	College/Junior/Club team (League)
1	1	Bryan Berard	United States	Detroit Jr. Red Wings (OHL)
2	27	Marc Moro	Canada	Kingston Frontenacs (OHL)
3	53	Brad Larsen	Canada	Swift Current Broncos (WHL)
4	89	Kevin Bolibruck	Canada	Peterborough Petes (OHL)
4	103	Kevin Boyd	Canada	London Knights (OHL)
6	131	David Hruska	Czech Republic	Banik Sokolov (Czech.)
8	183	Kaj Linna	Finland	Boston University (NCAA)
8	184	Ray Schultz	Canada	Tri-City Americans (WHL)
9	231	Erik Kaminski	United States	Northeastern University (Boston) (NCAA)

== Farm teams ==
=== Prince Edward Island Senators ===
Dave Allison began the 1995–96 as head coach of the club, however, he was promoted to Ottawa on November 20, 1995. Assistant coach John Phelan took over head coaching duties in Prince Edward Island. Allison earned a 10–11–2–0 record at the time of the coaching change. Under Phelan, the Senators were 28–22–4–3. Overall, the club finished the season with a 38–33–6–3 record, earning 85 points and first place in the Atlantic Division.

Jean-Yves Roy and Shawn Heaphy co-led the club with 40 goals, while Roy led the club with 95 points. Frédéric Cassivi led the Senators with 20 victories and had a team-best 3.27 GAA.

In the post-season, PEI was upset by the Fredericton Canadiens in the division semi-finals. Michel Picard scored a team-high five goals, while Roy led the team with 13 points. Cassivi had both playoff wins for the team.

=== Thunder Bay Senators ===
Tom Warden was named head coach of the Thunder Bay Senators for the 1995–96 season. The club finished in second place in the West Division with a 36–26–12 record, earning 84 points, and qualifying for the post-season.

Jason Firth led the team with 39 goals, and his 133 points ranked second in the league. Patrick Charbonneau led the club with 16 wins and had a team-best 3.25 GAA.

In the post-season, Thunder Bay defeated the Madison Monsters and Brantford Smoke before falling to the Flint Generals in the Colonial Cup finals. Jean Blouin led Thunder Bay with 23 goals and Firth led the club with 33 points.

== See also ==
- 1995–96 NHL season
