= 1995–96 Florida Panthers season =

National Hockey League season

1995–96 Florida Panthers
- Eastern Conference champions
- Division: 3rd Atlantic
- Conference: 4th Eastern
- 1995–96 record: 41–31–10
- Home record: 25–12–4
- Road record: 16–19–6
- Goals for: 254
- Goals against: 234

Team information
- General manager: Bryan Murray
- Coach: Doug MacLean
- Captain: Brian Skrudland
- Alternate captains: Scott Mellanby; Gord Murphy
- Arena: Miami Arena
- Average attendance: 13,278
- Minor league affiliates: Carolina Monarchs; Tallahassee Tiger Sharks; Detroit Falcons

Team leaders
- Goals: Scott Mellanby (32)
- Assists: Robert Svehla (49)
- Points: Scott Mellanby (70)
- Penalty minutes: Paul Laus (236)
- Plus/minus: Bill Lindsay (+13)
- Wins: John Vanbiesbrouck (26)
- Goals against average: John Vanbiesbrouck (2.68)

The 1995–96 Florida Panthers season was the third season of the franchise that was established in 1993. In their third season in the National Hockey League (NHL), the Panthers qualified for the Stanley Cup playoffs for the first time in franchise history, becoming the Eastern Conference champions. They then played in the 1996 Stanley Cup Final, where Florida lost to the Colorado Avalanche in four games. The Panthers would not win another playoff series until the 2021–22 season. This season was tied for their most successful season ever (also 2022–23) until the 2023–24 season, when the Panthers won the Stanley Cup Final.

== Off-season ==
Head coach Roger Neilson was fired on June 8. Player-development director Doug MacLean was named his replacement on July 24.

== Regular season ==
=== Year of the Rat ===
A very unusual goal celebration developed in Miami. On the night of the Panthers' 1995–96 home opener, a rat scurried across the Florida locker room. Panthers winger Scott Mellanby reacted by "one-timing" the rat against the wall, killing it. That night he scored two goals, which goaltender John Vanbiesbrouck quipped was "a rat trick". Two nights later, as the story found its way into the world, a few fans threw rubber rats on the ice in celebration of a goal. The rubber rat count went from 16 for the third home game to over 2,000 during the playoffs. In an amusing coincidence, 1996 was also year of the Rat according to Chinese astrology.

In the 1996 playoffs, as the fourth seed, the Panthers defeated the Boston Bruins in five games, then upset the top-seeded Philadelphia Flyers in six and the second-seeded Pittsburgh Penguins in seven games to reach the Stanley Cup Final. Their opponents, the Colorado Avalanche, eliminated the Panthers in four games.

=== Final standings ===
Atlantic Division
No.		GP	W	L	T	GF	GA	Pts
1	**Philadelphia Flyers**	82	45	24	13	282	208	103
2	**New York Rangers**	82	41	27	14	272	237	96
3	**Florida Panthers**	82	41	31	10	254	234	92
4	**Washington Capitals**	82	39	32	11	234	204	89
5	**Tampa Bay Lightning**	82	38	32	12	238	248	88
6	New Jersey Devils	82	37	33	12	215	202	86
7	New York Islanders	82	22	50	10	229	315	54

Eastern Conference
R		Div	GP	W	L	T	GF	GA	Pts
**1**	**Philadelphia Flyers**	**ATL**	**82**	**45**	**24**	**13**	**282**	**208**	**103**
**2**	**Pittsburgh Penguins**	**NE**	**82**	**49**	**29**	**4**	**362**	**284**	**102**
**3**	**New York Rangers**	**ATL**	**82**	**41**	**27**	**14**	**272**	**237**	**96**
**4**	**Florida Panthers**	**ATL**	**82**	**41**	**31**	**10**	**254**	**234**	**92**
**5**	**Boston Bruins**	**NE**	**82**	**40**	**31**	**11**	**282**	**269**	**91**
**6**	**Montreal Canadiens**	**NE**	**82**	**40**	**32**	**10**	**265**	**248**	**90**
**7**	**Washington Capitals**	**ATL**	**82**	**39**	**32**	**11**	**234**	**204**	**89**
**8**	**Tampa Bay Lightning**	**ATL**	**82**	**38**	**32**	**12**	**238**	**248**	**88**
9	New Jersey Devils	ATL	82	37	33	12	215	202	86
10	Hartford Whalers	NE	82	34	39	9	237	259	77
11	Buffalo Sabres	NE	82	33	42	7	247	262	73
12	New York Islanders	ATL	82	22	50	10	229	315	54
13	Ottawa Senators	NE	82	18	59	5	191	291	41

Divisions: ATL – Atlantic, NE – Northeast

bold – Qualified for playoffs

== Playoffs ==
=== Eastern Conference Quarterfinals ===
The fifth-seeded Boston Bruins had one of the best offenses in the Eastern Conference, scoring 282 goals led by Cam Neely (26 goals) and Adam Oates (25 goals, 67 assists). The Panthers won their first-ever playoff game 6-3 before a sold out Miami Arena, and soon built a 3–0 lead despite being outshot by the Bruins on all games. The Bruins stepped up to win Game 4 with a 6-2 blowout before the Boston crowd. Game 5 was tied 3-3 when with 4:57 left, Bill Lindsay scored with a dive through the air goal while being tripped by star defenseman Ray Bourque, giving the Panthers their first-ever playoff series victory. This was the last year in a record 29 consecutive seasons in the playoffs for the Bruins, as they missed the 1997 post-season.

=== Eastern Conference Semifinals ===
The Philadelphia Flyers finished atop the Eastern Conference in the regular season with 103 points, led by the high-scoring "Legion of Doom" and the strong goaltending of Garth Snow and Ron Hextall. Philadelphia had just eliminated the other Florida team, the Tampa Bay Lightning, in five games after overcoming a 2–1 series deficit.

Vanbiesbrouck posted a 2–0 shutout in Game 1, and it took until midway through Game 2 for the Flyers to get rolling offensively in a narrow 3–2 win. Game 3 saw Flyers veterans Dan Quinn, Dale Hawerchuk, Eric Desjardins and Hextall set the tone in a 3–1 victory. With young defenseman Ed Jovanovski tightly covering Flyers superstar Eric Lindros, the Panthers reversed the tide, defeating the Flyers in overtime in Game 4 and double-overtime in Game 5, in what would turn out to be the last Flyers game at the Spectrum. Lindros promised to win game 6 to return the series to Philadelphia, but the Panthers won with a 4–1 score. Florida became the third team to reach the conference finals in their third season – following fellow expansion team New York Islanders in 1975 and the Quebec Nordiques in 1982.

=== Eastern Conference Finals ===
The 2-seeded Pittsburgh Penguins were energized by the return of Mario Lemieux, who missed the entire 1994–95 season due to injury, and had the league's best offense, scoring 362 goals, and the most wins in the Eastern conference with 49, finishing just one point behind the Flyers. The Penguins advanced to the third round for the first time since 1992, defeating the Washington Capitals in six games and the New York Rangers in five games.

Despite being outshot 33–25 in game one the Panthers came out on top with an impressive 5–1 win, with 32 saves by Vanbiesbrouck and two goals by forward Tom Fitzgerald. The Penguins wanting to avoid going down two games to none against the Panthers came out with a better effort in game two and won the game 3–2 and evened the series at one game each. In game three the Panthers fired an incredible 61 shots on Penguins goaltender Tom Barrasso and it paid off as the Panthers won 5–2 – two goals by Stu Barnes – to take a 2–1 series lead. The Penguins tied game four on Brad Lauer's goal with 11:03 remaining in regulation, and Bryan Smolinski scored with 3:31 to go to give the Penguins a 2–1 lead, tying the series. In game five the Penguins shut out the Panthers 3–0, with Barrasso stopping 28 shots.

Leading the series three games to two Pittsburgh looked to advance to the Stanley Cup Finals in game six. The Penguins led 2–1 in the second period but the Panthers scored three of the next four goals and edged the Penguins 4–3 to tie the series at 3–3. In game seven Florida got a 1–0 lead on Mike Hough's goal at 13:13 of the first period. After a scoreless second period Pittsburgh tied the game on Petr Nedvěd's power-play goal at 1:23 of the third period. The Panthers regained the lead on Tom Fitzgerald's bizarre 58-foot slapshot at 6:18 and got an insurance goal from Johan Garpenlov at 17:23. Florida hung on to win the game 3–1, with a total of 39 saves by Vanbiesbrouck, and closed the series four games to three.

By reaching the finals in only their third season, the Panthers became the fastest expansion team to do so since the St. Louis Blues reached the Stanley Cup finals in their first three seasons. Many Panthers players were managing their first trips to the finals after long careers, such as Vanbiesbrouck (13 years).

=== Stanley Cup Final ===
In the first Stanley Cup Final where neither team had ever reached the decision before, the Panthers faced the Colorado Avalanche, who were in their inaugural season after relocating from Quebec City. Led by captain Joe Sakic, forward Peter Forsberg and defenceman Adam Foote, the Avalanche got even stronger once goaltender Patrick Roy joined the team in December 1995. The Avalanche finished the season with a 47–25–10 record for 104 points, won the Pacific Division and finished second in the Western Conference. On their way to the Western title, the Avs beat the Vancouver Canucks, the Chicago Blackhawks and Presidents' Trophy winners Detroit Red Wings, all in six games.

The series started in Denver, and the Avs dominated the Panthers at the McNichols Sports Arena. On game 1, Vanbiesbrouck shut out Colorado for half the game, before three goals were scored in a stretch of 3:49 minutes in the second period, leading to a 3–1 victory. The following game was an 8–1 blowout, starting with three power play goals in the first period as Florida incurred in bad penalties that forced Vanbiesbrouck to be pulled out in favor of Mark Fitzpatrick. Returning to Miami, Game 3 was closer, with Florida scoring twice in the first period. But the Avs still came through, taking over the lead with a Joe Sakic goal early in the second period and holding on to a 3–2 victory.

With their backs to the wall, the Panthers played a defensive game four. Vanbiesbrouck and Roy stood out, combining for 118 saves, and the two teams played a marathon game that took until the third overtime period. Uwe Krupp's unassisted goal at 4:31 ended 44 minutes and 31 seconds of overtime and gave the Avalanche a 1–0 win and a four-games-to-none series win. Goaltender Patrick Roy stopped all 63 shots he faced. Colorado outscored Florida 15–4 in the series, and Patrick Roy stopped 147 of 151 shots, for a save percentage of .974. Joe Sakic was awarded the Conn Smythe Trophy as playoff MVP, having led all skaters in goals with 18, and points with 34. For both Patrick Roy and Claude Lemieux, it was their third Stanley Cup win in eleven years.

== Schedule and results ==
=== Regular season ===
1995–96 regular season
October: 7–4–0 (home: 5–2–0; road: 2–2–0)

Game	Date	Score	Opponent	Record	Recap
1	October 7, 1995	0–4	@ New Jersey Devils (1995–96)	0–1–0	L
2	October 8, 1995	4–3	Calgary Flames (1995–96)	1–1–0	W
3	October 11, 1995	6–1	Montreal Canadiens (1995–96)	2–1–0	W
4	October 13, 1995	6–2	Ottawa Senators (1995–96)	3–1–0	W
5	October 15, 1995	5–3	New York Islanders (1995–96)	4–1–0	W
6	October 17, 1995	3–6	Chicago Blackhawks (1995–96)	4–2–0	L
7	October 21, 1995	3–0	Hartford Whalers (1995–96)	5–2–0	W
8	October 24, 1995	6–1	@ Toronto Maple Leafs (1995–96)	6–2–0	W
9	October 25, 1995	2–7	@ Montreal Canadiens (1995–96)	6–3–0	L
10	October 28, 1995	4–1	@ Ottawa Senators (1995–96)	7–3–0	W
11	October 31, 1995	4–5 OT	New York Islanders (1995–96)	7–4–0	L

November: 10–2–1 (home: 7–1–1; road: 3–1–0)

Game	Date	Score	Opponent	Record	Recap
12	November 2, 1995	2–1	@ Philadelphia Flyers (1995–96)	8–4–0	W
13	November 3, 1995	3–2	@ Washington Capitals (1995–96)	9–4–0	W
14	November 5, 1995	4–1	Tampa Bay Lightning (1995–96)	10–4–0	W
15	November 7, 1995	4–2	Philadelphia Flyers (1995–96)	11–4–0	W
16	November 9, 1995	2–1	Edmonton Oilers (1995–96)	12–4–0	W
17	November 11, 1995	4–1	Buffalo Sabres (1995–96)	13–4–0	W
18	November 14, 1995	5–2	Toronto Maple Leafs (1995–96)	14–4–0	W
19	November 16, 1995	2–2 OT	Vancouver Canucks (1995–96)	14–4–1	T
20	November 18, 1995	2–3	@ Los Angeles Kings (1995–96)	14–5–1	L
21	November 19, 1995	4–3	@ Mighty Ducks of Anaheim (1995–96)	15–5–1	W
22	November 21, 1995	4–3	New Jersey Devils (1995–96)	16–5–1	W
23	November 26, 1995	5–1	Los Angeles Kings (1995–96)	17–5–1	W
24	November 29, 1995	1–2 OT	Philadelphia Flyers (1995–96)	17–6–1	L

December: 8–4–1 (home: 3–1–1; road: 5–3–0)

Game	Date	Score	Opponent	Record	Recap
25	December 1, 1995	1–2	@ Pittsburgh Penguins (1995–96)	17–7–1	L
26	December 2, 1995	5–3	@ Hartford Whalers (1995–96)	18–7–1	W
27	December 5, 1995	4–3	@ Washington Capitals (1995–96)	19–7–1	W
28	December 7, 1995	3–3 OT	Mighty Ducks of Anaheim (1995–96)	19–7–2	T
29	December 9, 1995	3–1	Boston Bruins (1995–96)	20–7–2	W
30	December 11, 1995	2–1	@ New Jersey Devils (1995–96)	21–7–2	W
31	December 12, 1995	3–1	@ New York Islanders (1995–96)	22–7–2	W
32	December 14, 1995	4–6	@ Boston Bruins (1995–96)	22–8–2	L
33	December 16, 1995	7–2	@ Tampa Bay Lightning (1995–96)	23–8–2	W
34	December 21, 1995	6–1	Winnipeg Jets (1995–96)	24–8–2	W
35	December 23, 1995	2–1	New Jersey Devils (1995–96)	25–8–2	W
36	December 28, 1995	4–5	Washington Capitals (1995–96)	25–9–2	L
37	December 30, 1995	5–6	@ Pittsburgh Penguins (1995–96)	25–10–2	L

January: 6–4–3 (home: 3–1–0; road: 3–3–3)

Game	Date	Score	Opponent	Record	Recap
38	January 3, 1996	2–7	@ Vancouver Canucks (1995–96)	25–11–2	L
39	January 5, 1996	3–2	@ Edmonton Oilers (1995–96)	26–11–2	W
40	January 6, 1996	0–2	@ Calgary Flames (1995–96)	26–12–2	L
41	January 8, 1996	5–2	@ San Jose Sharks (1995–96)	27–12–2	W
42	January 10, 1996	4–4 OT	@ Colorado Avalanche (1995–96)	27–12–3	T
43	January 12, 1996	6–6 OT	@ Dallas Stars (1995–96)	27–12–4	T
44	January 16, 1996	4–1	San Jose Sharks (1995–96)	28–12–4	W
45	January 22, 1996	1–1 OT	@ Philadelphia Flyers (1995–96)	28–12–5	T
46	January 23, 1996	5–4	@ Washington Capitals (1995–96)	29–12–5	W
47	January 25, 1996	2–6	Montreal Canadiens (1995–96)	29–13–5	L
48	January 27, 1996	6–3	Buffalo Sabres (1995–96)	30–13–5	W
49	January 29, 1996	2–1	Pittsburgh Penguins (1995–96)	31–13–5	W
50	January 31, 1996	1–6	@ Buffalo Sabres (1995–96)	31–14–5	L

February: 4–5–3 (home: 2–3–2; road: 2–2–1)

Game	Date	Score	Opponent	Record	Recap
51	February 1, 1996	2–2 OT	@ Boston Bruins (1995–96)	31–14–6	T
52	February 3, 1996	5–3	@ Tampa Bay Lightning (1995–96)	32–14–6	W
53	February 6, 1996	2–4	@ Detroit Red Wings (1995–96)	32–15–6	L
54	February 8, 1996	3–1	Detroit Red Wings (1995–96)	33–15–6	W
55	February 11, 1996	2–2 OT	St. Louis Blues (1995–96)	33–15–7	T
56	February 14, 1996	2–4	Philadelphia Flyers (1995–96)	33–16–7	L
57	February 16, 1996	4–5 OT	Colorado Avalanche (1995–96)	33–17–7	L
58	February 18, 1996	6–4	Dallas Stars (1995–96)	34–17–7	W
59	February 21, 1996	4–1	@ New Jersey Devils (1995–96)	35–17–7	W
60	February 24, 1996	0–4	New York Rangers (1995–96)	35–18–7	L
61	February 25, 1996	1–6	@ Buffalo Sabres (1995–96)	35–19–7	L
62	February 29, 1996	2–2 OT	Washington Capitals (1995–96)	35–19–8	T

March: 3–9–1 (home: 3–3–0; road: 0–6–1)

Game	Date	Score	Opponent	Record	Recap
63	March 2, 1996	1–7	@ Hartford Whalers (1995–96)	35–20–8	L
64	March 5, 1996	0–2	@ St. Louis Blues (1995–96)	35–21–8	L
65	March 7, 1996	3–5	@ Winnipeg Jets (1995–96)	35–22–8	L
66	March 10, 1996	1–4	Boston Bruins (1995–96)	35–23–8	L
67	March 11, 1996	4–8	@ Chicago Blackhawks (1995–96)	35–24–8	L
68	March 13, 1996	3–3 OT	@ New York Rangers (1995–96)	35–24–9	T
69	March 17, 1996	3–0	New Jersey Devils (1995–96)	36–24–9	W
70	March 19, 1996	5–2	Ottawa Senators (1995–96)	37–24–9	W
71	March 21, 1996	3–2	New York Islanders (1995–96)	38–24–9	W
72	March 23, 1996	2–4	@ Tampa Bay Lightning (1995–96)	38–25–9	L
73	March 27, 1996	0–3	@ New York Rangers (1995–96)	38–26–9	L
74	March 28, 1996	2–3	Pittsburgh Penguins (1995–96)	38–27–9	L
75	March 30, 1996	1–2	Tampa Bay Lightning (1995–96)	38–28–9	L

April: 3–3–1 (home: 2–1–0; road: 1–2–1)

Game	Date	Score	Opponent	Record	Recap
76	April 1, 1996	3–2	Hartford Whalers (1995–96)	39–28–9	W
77	April 3, 1996	2–3	@ Ottawa Senators (1995–96)	39–29–9	L
78	April 6, 1996	1–2	@ Montreal Canadiens (1995–96)	39–30–9	L
79	April 8, 1996	5–3	@ New York Rangers (1995–96)	40–30–9	W
80	April 10, 1996	1–2	Tampa Bay Lightning (1995–96)	40–31–9	L
81	April 12, 1996	1–1 OT	@ New York Islanders (1995–96)	40–31–10	T
82	April 14, 1996	5–1	New York Rangers (1995–96)	41–31–10	W

Legend: W Win (2 points) L Loss (0 points) T Tie (1 point)

=== Playoffs ===
1996 Stanley Cup playoffs
Eastern Conference Quarterfinals vs. (5) Boston Bruins – Panthers win 4–1

Game	Date	Score	Opponent	Attendance	Decision	Series	Recap
1	April 17, 1996	6–3	Boston Bruins	14,703	Vanbiesbrouck	Panthers lead 1–0	W
2	April 22, 1996	6–2	Boston Bruins	14,703	Vanbiesbrouck	Panthers lead 2–0	W
3	April 24, 1996	4–2	@ Boston Bruins	14,922	Vanbiesbrouck	Panthers lead 3–0	W
4	April 25, 1996	2–6	@ Boston Bruins	14,810	Vanbiesbrouck	Panthers lead 3–1	L
5	April 27, 1996	4–3	Boston Bruins	14,703	Vanbiesbrouck	Panthers win 4–1	W

Eastern Conference Semifinals vs. (1) Philadelphia Flyers – Panthers win 4–2

Game	Date	Score	Opponent	Attendance	Decision	Series	Recap
1	May 2, 1996	2–0	@ Philadelphia Flyers	17,380	Vanbiesbrouck	Panthers lead 1–0	W
2	May 4, 1996	0–2	@ Philadelphia Flyers	17,380	Vanbiesbrouck	Series tied 1–1	L
3	May 7, 1996	2–3	Philadelphia Flyers	14,703	Vanbiesbrouck	Flyers lead 2–1	L
4	May 9, 1996	4–3 OT	Philadelphia Flyers	14,703	Vanbiesbrouck	Series tied 2–2	W
5	May 12, 1996	2–1 2OT	@ Philadelphia Flyers	17,380	Vanbiesbrouck	Panthers lead 3–2	W
6	May 14, 1996	4–1	Philadelphia Flyers	14,703	Vanbiesbrouck	Panthers win 4–2	W

Eastern Conference Finals vs. (2) Pittsburgh Penguins – Panthers win 4–3

Game	Date	Score	Opponent	Attendance	Decision	Series	Recap
1	May 18, 1996	5–1	@ Pittsburgh Penguins	17,355	Vanbiesbrouck	Panthers lead 1–0	W
2	May 20, 1996	2–3	@ Pittsburgh Penguins	17,181	Vanbiesbrouck	Series tied 1–1	L
3	May 24, 1996	5–2	Pittsburgh Penguins	14,703	Vanbiesbrouck	Panthers lead 2–1	W
4	May 26, 1996	1–2	Pittsburgh Penguins	14,703	Vanbiesbrouck	Series tied 2–2	L
5	May 28, 1996	0–3	@ Pittsburgh Penguins	17,355	Vanbiesbrouck	Penguins lead 3–2	L
6	May 30, 1996	4–3	Pittsburgh Penguins	14,703	Vanbiesbrouck	Series tied 3–3	W
7	June 1, 1996	3–1	@ Pittsburgh Penguins	17,355	Vanbiesbrouck	Panthers win 4–3	W

Stanley Cup Finals vs. (W2) Colorado Avalanche – Avalanche win 4–0

Game	Date	Score	Opponent	Attendance	Decision	Series	Recap
1	June 4, 1996	1–3	@ Colorado Avalanche	16,061	Vanbiesbrouck	Avalanche lead 1–0	L
2	June 6, 1996	1–8	@ Colorado Avalanche	16,061	Vanbiesbrouck	Avalanche lead 2–0	L
3	June 8, 1996	2–3	Colorado Avalanche	14,703	Vanbiesbrouck	Avalanche lead 3–0	L
4	June 10, 1996	0–1 3OT	Colorado Avalanche	14,703	Vanbiesbrouck	Avalanche win 4–0	L

Legend: W Win L Loss

== Player statistics ==
=== Scoring ===
- Position abbreviations: C = Center; D = Defense; G = Goaltender; LW = Left wing; RW = Right wing
- † = Joined team via a transaction (e.g., trade, waivers, signing) during the season. Stats reflect time with the Panthers only.
- ‡ = Left team via a transaction (e.g., trade, waivers, release) during the season. Stats reflect time with the Panthers only.

No.	Player	Pos	Regular season						Playoffs					
No.	Player	Pos	GP	G	A	Pts	+/-	PIM	GP	G	A	Pts	+/-	PIM
27	Scott Mellanby	RW	79	32	38	70	4	160	22	3	6	9	−10	44
44	Rob Niedermayer	C	82	26	35	61	1	107	22	5	3	8	−8	12
24	Robert Svehla	D	81	8	49	57	−3	94	22	0	6	6	3	32
29	Johan Garpenlov	LW	82	23	28	51	−10	36	20	4	2	6	−2	8
14	Stu Barnes	C	72	19	25	44	−12	46	22	6	10	16	10	4
26	Jesse Belanger‡	C	63	17	21	38	−5	10	—	—	—	—	—	—
12	Jody Hull	RW	78	20	17	37	5	25	14	3	2	5	4	0
21	Tom Fitzgerald	RW	82	13	21	34	−3	75	22	4	4	8	3	34
11	Bill Lindsay	RW	73	12	22	34	13	57	22	5	5	10	6	18
6	Jason Woolley	D	52	6	28	34	−9	32	13	2	6	8	3	14
5	Gord Murphy	D	70	8	22	30	5	30	14	0	4	4	1	6
9	Radek Dvorak	RW	77	13	14	27	5	20	16	1	3	4	2	0
20	Brian Skrudland	C	79	7	20	27	6	129	21	1	3	4	6	18
10	Dave Lowry	LW	63	10	14	24	−2	36	22	10	7	17	8	39
18	Mike Hough	LW	64	7	16	23	4	37	22	4	1	5	5	8
55	Ed Jovanovski	D	70	10	11	21	−3	137	22	1	8	9	2	52
2	Terry Carkner	D	73	3	10	13	10	80	22	0	4	4	8	10
8	Magnus Svensson	D	27	2	9	11	−1	21	—	—	—	—	—	—
26 (Note: Sheppard wore number 16 in his first two games.)	Ray Sheppard†	RW	14	8	2	10	0	4	21	8	8	16	4	4
25	Geoff Smith	D	31	3	7	10	−4	20	1	0	0	0	−1	2
3	Paul Laus	D	78	3	6	9	−2	236	21	2	6	8	3	62
28	Martin Straka†	C	12	2	4	6	1	6	13	2	2	4	−2	2
16	Gilbert Dionne†	LW	5	1	2	3	0	0	—	—	—	—	—	—
15	Brett Harkins	LW	8	0	3	3	−2	6	—	—	—	—	—	—
23 (Note: Warrener wore number 45 in his first eleven games)	Rhett Warrener	D	28	0	3	3	4	46	21	0	1	1	3	0
19	Brad Smyth	RW	7	1	1	2	−3	4	—	—	—	—	—	—
51	David Nemirovsky	RW	9	0	2	2	−1	2	—	—	—	—	—	—
34	John Vanbiesbrouck	G	57	0	2	2		10	22	0	1	1		20
22	Bob Kudelski‡	RW	13	0	1	1	1	0	—	—	—	—	—	—
40	Steve Washburn	C	1	0	1	1	1	0	1	0	1	1	0	0
7	Mike Casselman†	C	3	0	0	0	−1	0	—	—	—	—	—	—
30	Mark Fitzpatrick	G	34	0	0	0		12	2	0	0	0		0

=== Goaltending ===
No.	Player	Regular season										Playoffs								
No.	Player	GP	W	L	T	SA	GA	GAA	SV%	SO	TOI	GP	W	L	SA	GA	GAA	SV%	SO	TOI
34	John Vanbiesbrouck	57	26	20	7	1473	142	2.68	.904	2	3178	22	12	10	735	50	2.25	.932	1	1332
30	Mark Fitzpatrick	34	15	11	3	810	88	2.96	.891	0	1786	2	0	0	30	6	6.00	.800	0	60

== Awards and records ==
=== Awards ===
Type	Award/honor	Recipient	Ref
League (annual)	NHL All-Rookie Team	Ed Jovanovski (Defense)	
League (in-season)	NHL All-Star Game selection	Doug MacLean (coach)	
League (in-season)	NHL All-Star Game selection	Scott Mellanby	
League (in-season)	NHL All-Star Game selection	John Vanbiesbrouck	

=== Milestones ===
Milestone	Player	Date	Ref
First game	Radek Dvorak	October 7, 1995	
First game	Rhett Warrener	October 7, 1995	
First game	David Nemirovsky	October 8, 1995	
First game	Ed Jovanovski	November 2, 1995	
First game	Mike Casselman	February 24, 1996	
First game	Brad Smyth	February 25, 1996	
First game	Steve Washburn	April 14, 1996	

== Transactions ==
=== Trades ===
The Panthers acquired Ray Sheppard from the San Jose Sharks on the trade deadline in 1996.

== Draft picks ==
Florida's draft picks at the 1995 NHL entry draft held at the Edmonton Coliseum in Edmonton, Alberta.

Round	#	Player	Pos	Nationality	College/junior/club team
1	10	Radek Dvorak	RW	Czech Republic	HC České Budějovice (ELH)
2	36	Aaron MacDonald	G	Canada	Swift Current Broncos (WHL)
3	62	Mike O'Grady	D	Canada	Lethbridge Hurricanes (WHL)
4	80	Dave Duerden	LW	Canada	Peterborough Petes (OHL)
4	88	Daniel Tjarnqvist	D	Sweden	Rögle BK (Sweden)
5	114	Francois Cloutier	LW	Canada	Hull Olympiques (QMJHL)
7	166	Peter Worrell	LW	Canada	Hull Olympiques (QMJHL)
8	192	Filip Kuba	D	Czech Republic	HC Vítkovice (ELH)
9	218	David Lemanowicz	G	Canada	Spokane Chiefs (WHL)
