= Kerry Huffman =

Canadian ice hockey player (born 1968)

- Born: January 3, 1968 (age 58) Peterborough, Ontario, Canada
- Height: 6 ft 2 in (188 cm)
- Weight: 200 lb (91 kg; 14 st 4 lb)
- Position: Defence
- Shot: Left
- Played for: Philadelphia Flyers; Quebec Nordiques; Ottawa Senators
- National team: Canada
- NHL draft: 20th overall, 1986; Philadelphia Flyers
- Playing career: 1987–1998

Kerry Huffman (born January 3, 1968) is a Canadian former professional ice hockey defenceman who played for the Philadelphia Flyers, Quebec Nordiques and Ottawa Senators in the National Hockey League (NHL). Huffman is currently employed by the Calgary Flames as a professional scout.

== Biography ==
As a youth, Huffman played in the 1981 Quebec International Pee-Wee Hockey Tournament with a minor ice hockey team from Peterborough, Ontario.

Huffman was drafted in the first-round, 20th overall by the Philadelphia Flyers in the 1986 NHL entry draft and spent six seasons with the team. On June 30, 1992, he was involved in the Eric Lindros trade, involving 1991's first overall pick Eric Lindros. The deal saw Huffman traded to the Quebec Nordiques, along with Peter Forsberg, Mike Ricci, Ron Hextall, Chris Simon, Steve Duchesne, a first-round pick in the 1993 and 1994 Drafts and $15,000,000 for Lindros, who refused to play for the Nordiques. He later played for the Ottawa Senators before returning to Philadelphia in a trade in 1996. In total, Huffman played 401 regular season games, scoring 37 goals and 108 assists for 145 points and collecting 361 penalty minutes.

Since the 2016–17 season, Huffman had served as an assistant coach for the Lehigh Valley Phantoms of the American Hockey League under Scott Gordon. In the 2018–19 season, Huffman was promoted to interim head coach after Gordon departed for the interim head coaching position with the Philadelphia Flyers. Upon Gordon's return to the Phantoms at the end of the season, Huffman resumed his duties as an assistant coach, until Gordon stepped down as head coach on May 18, 2021.

Huffman headed across the state to work with the Pittsburgh Penguins and was relieved of his duties as the Director of Pro Scouting by Pittsburgh Penguins GM Kyle Dubas on June 2, 2023.

Ahead of the 2023 training camp, the Calgary Flames introduced Huffman as a new professional scout.

== Career statistics ==
=== Regular season and playoffs ===
			Regular season					Playoffs
Season	Team	League	GP	G	A	Pts	PIM	GP	G	A	Pts	PIM
1984–85	Peterborough Roadrunners	MetJHL	24	2	5	7	53	—	—	—	—	—
1985–86	Guelph Platers	OHL	56	3	24	27	35	20	1	10	11	10
1986–87	Philadelphia Flyers	NHL	9	0	0	0	2	—	—	—	—	—
1986–87	Guelph Platers	OHL	44	4	31	35	20	5	0	2	2	8
1986–87	Hershey Bears	AHL	3	0	1	1	0	4	0	0	0	0
1987–88	Philadelphia Flyers	NHL	52	6	17	23	34	2	0	0	0	0
1988–89	Philadelphia Flyers	NHL	29	0	11	11	31	—	—	—	—	—
1988–89	Hershey Bears	AHL	29	2	13	15	16	—	—	—	—	—
1989–90	Philadelphia Flyers	NHL	43	1	12	13	34	—	—	—	—	—
1990–91	Hershey Bears	AHL	45	5	29	34	20	7	1	2	3	0
1990–91	Philadelphia Flyers	NHL	10	1	2	3	10	—	—	—	—	—
1991–92	Philadelphia Flyers	NHL	60	14	18	32	41	—	—	—	—	—
1992–93	Quebec Nordiques	NHL	52	4	18	22	54	3	0	0	0	0
1993–94	Quebec Nordiques	NHL	28	0	6	6	28	—	—	—	—	—
1993–94	Ottawa Senators	NHL	34	4	8	12	12	—	—	—	—	—
1994–95	Ottawa Senators	NHL	37	2	4	6	46	—	—	—	—	—
1995–96	Ottawa Senators	NHL	43	4	11	15	63	—	—	—	—	—
1995–96	Philadelphia Flyers	NHL	4	1	1	2	2	6	0	0	0	2
1996–97	Las Vegas Thunder	IHL	44	5	19	24	38	3	0	0	0	2
1997–98	Grand Rapids Griffins	IHL	73	4	23	27	60	3	0	0	0	2
1998–99	Grand Rapids Griffins	IHL	4	0	1	1	6	—	—	—	—	—
NHL totals			401	37	108	145	361	11	0	0	0	2

=== International ===
Year	Team	Event	GP	G	A	Pts	PIM
1987	Canada	WJC	6	0	1	1	4
1992	Canada	WC	6	1	0	1	2
Junior totals			6	0	1	1	4
Senior totals			6	1	0	1	2

=== Head coaching record ===
Team	Year	Regular season							Postseason
Team	Year	G	W	L	T	OTL	Pts	Finish	Result
LHV	2018–19	50	24	21	—	5	53	4th in Atlantic	—
LHV Totals		50	24	21	–	5	53	0 division titles	0 playoff appearances
AHL Totals		50	24	21	–	5	53	0 division titles	0 playoff appearances

Preceded by Glen Seabrooke	Philadelphia Flyers' first-round draft pick 1986	Succeeded by Darren Rumble
