= Stewart Malgunas =

Canadian ice hockey player (born 1970)

- Born: April 21, 1970 (age 56) Prince George, British Columbia, Canada
- Height: 6 ft 0 in (183 cm)
- Weight: 200 lb (91 kg; 14 st 4 lb)
- Position: Defence
- Shot: Left
- Played for: Philadelphia Flyers; Winnipeg Jets; Washington Capitals; Calgary Flames
- NHL draft: 66th overall, 1990; Detroit Red Wings
- Playing career: 1990–2003

Stewart J. Malgunas (born April 21, 1970) is a Canadian former professional ice hockey defenceman who played 129 games in the National Hockey League (NHL) with the Philadelphia Flyers, Winnipeg Jets, Washington Capitals and Calgary Flames.

== Playing career ==
Originally selected in the 1990 NHL entry draft by the Detroit Red Wings, Malgunas was traded to the Philadelphia Flyers and made his NHL debut during the 1993–94 season.

== Career statistics ==
			Regular season					Playoffs
Season	Team	League	GP	G	A	Pts	PIM	GP	G	A	Pts	PIM
1985–86	Prince George Spruce Kings	PCJHL	49	10	25	35	85	—	—	—	—	—
1986–87	Prince George Spruce Kings	PCJHL	50	11	31	42	102	—	—	—	—	—
1987–88	Prince George Spruce Kings	PCJHL	48	12	34	46	99	—	—	—	—	—
1987–88	New Westminster Bruins	WHL	6	0	0	0	0	—	—	—	—	—
1988–89	Seattle Thunderbirds	WHL	72	11	41	52	51	—	—	—	—	—
1989–90	Seattle Thunderbirds	WHL	63	15	48	63	116	13	2	9	11	32
1990–91	Adirondack Red Wings	AHL	78	5	19	24	70	2	0	0	0	4
1991–92	Adirondack Red Wings	AHL	69	4	28	32	82	18	2	6	8	28
1992–93	Adirondack Red Wings	AHL	45	3	5	8	28	11	3	3	6	8
1993–94	Philadelphia Flyers	NHL	67	1	3	4	86	—	—	—	—	—
1994–95	Hershey Bears	AHL	32	3	5	8	28	6	2	1	3	31
1994–95	Philadelphia Flyers	NHL	4	0	0	0	4	—	—	—	—	—
1995–96	Portland Pirates	AHL	16	2	5	7	18	13	1	3	4	19
1995–96	Winnipeg Jets	NHL	29	0	1	1	32	—	—	—	—	—
1995–96	Washington Capitals	NHL	1	0	0	0	0	—	—	—	—	—
1996–97	Portland Pirates	AHL	68	6	12	18	59	5	0	0	0	8
1996–97	Washington Capitals	NHL	6	0	0	0	2	—	—	—	—	—
1997–98	Portland Pirates	AHL	69	14	25	39	73	9	1	1	2	19
1997–98	Washington Capitals	NHL	8	0	0	0	12	—	—	—	—	—
1998–99	Washington Capitals	NHL	10	0	0	0	6	—	—	—	—	—
1998–99	Portland Pirates	AHL	33	2	10	12	49	—	—	—	—	—
1998–99	Detroit Vipers	IHL	9	0	2	2	10	11	0	1	1	21
1999–00	Utah Grizzlies	IHL	34	4	9	13	55	—	—	—	—	—
1999–00	Calgary Flames	NHL	4	0	1	1	2	—	—	—	—	—
2000–01	Hershey Bears	AHL	25	0	2	2	39	11	0	1	1	21
2001–02	Frankfurt Lions	DEL	50	4	11	15	108	—	—	—	—	—
2002–03	Frankfurt Lions	DEL	51	2	13	15	113	—	—	—	—	—
NHL totals			129	1	5	6	144	—	—	—	—	—

== Awards ==
- WHL West First All-Star Team – 1990
