= 1995–96 NHL season =

National Hockey League season

- League: National Hockey League
- Sport: Ice hockey
- Duration: October 6, 1995 – June 10, 1996
- Games: 82
- Teams: 26
- TV partner(s): CBC, TSN, SRC (Canada); ESPN, Fox (United States)

Draft
- Top draft pick: Bryan Berard
- Picked by: Ottawa Senators

Regular season
- Presidents' Trophy: Detroit Red Wings
- Season MVP: Mario Lemieux (Penguins)
- Top scorer: Mario Lemieux (Penguins)

Playoffs
- Playoffs MVP: Joe Sakic (Avalanche)

Stanley Cup
- Champions: Colorado Avalanche
- Runners-up: Florida Panthers

NHL seasons
- 1994–95 1996–97

From 1986-1998 the all volunteer team raised over six million dollars for charities with sell-out crowds in Philadelphia, Boston, Chicago, Detroit and more.

The 1995–96 NHL season was the 79th regular season of the National Hockey League. As part of the league's new collective bargaining agreement (CBA) signed after the 1994–95 NHL lockout, each team began playing 82 games per season. The Quebec Nordiques relocated to Denver, Colorado, becoming the Colorado Avalanche. The Stanley Cup winners were the Avalanche, who swept the Florida Panthers in the finals, in four games.

== League business ==
=== Franchise relocation ===
The 1995–96 season was the first season in Denver for the Avalanche, who had relocated from Quebec City where they were previously known as the Quebec Nordiques. Prior to the season, Colorado was assigned to the Pacific Division of the Western Conference. They played at McNichols Arena from 1976 to 1982 before they were purchased and moved to become the New Jersey Devils. The Avs would play in that building until they moved to the Pepsi Center in 1999.

It was also the final season for the Winnipeg Jets until the 2011–12 season, as the franchise's assets relocated from Manitoba to Arizona and become the Phoenix Coyotes at season's end. The NHL would not return to Manitoba until the Atlanta Thrashers moved there to become the "new" Jets in 2011.

=== Implementation of an 82-game schedule ===
During the 1992–93 and 1993–94 seasons, each team played 84 games (including two neutral site games). The 1994–95 NHL lockout had resulted in a shortened 48-game season and the cancellation of the planned neutral site games. Starting in the 1995–96 season, the neutral site games were eliminated, reducing the regular season to 82 games per team. The NHL would maintain 82-game schedules each season (with the exception of the lockout-cancelled 2004–05 season, the lockout-shortened 2012–13 season, and the COVID-shortened 2019–20 and 2020–21 seasons) until the 2025–26 season, with the league adding two divisional games to increase the schedule back to 84 games per team starting in the 2026–27 season.

=== Implementation of the entry draft lottery ===
This was the first year that the entry drafting order was partially set by a draft lottery system, allowing teams who had missed the playoffs to have a chance to move up in the order. Teams would no longer be guaranteed the first overall pick if they finished with the worst record during the previous regular season, and therefore have less incentive to "tank".

The 1995 NHL entry draft was then held at the Northlands Coliseum in Edmonton, Alberta, on July 8. Bryan Berard was selected first overall by the Ottawa Senators.

== Uniform changes ==
=== Third jersey program ===
Improvements in dye-sublimation printing on modern uniform fabrics, having been featured in recent seasons on uniforms in the National Basketball Association and the Canadian Football League, had caught the interest of the NHL, which decided to allow alternate jerseys that could take advantage of this technology to produce new and unusual designs not possible under traditional jersey-making techniques. Six teams elected to participate in the process, but St. Louis Blues coach and general manager Mike Keenan vetoed the Blues' proposed third jersey, which would have featured blaring trumpets across the front. The five teams that did participate were the Mighty Ducks of Anaheim, Boston Bruins, Los Angeles Kings, Pittsburgh Penguins, and Vancouver Canucks.

The Ducks' and Kings' third jerseys proved unpopular at the time and were retired by the end of the season, while the Canucks underwent a complete rebrand for the 1997–98 season. The Penguins' third jersey was promoted to their primary road jersey for the 1997 Stanley Cup playoffs through the 2001–02 season, and the Bruins retained their third jersey the longest, through the 2005–06 season.

=== Additional uniform changes ===
In addition to the Avalanche, two other teams underwent rebrands prior to the season, albeit only changing their logos and colors. The New York Islanders used the dye-sublimation technique to create new jerseys with wavy stripes as well as a logo bearing a fisherman mascot, which ended up being heavily derided and phased out over the next few seasons. The Washington Capitals abandoned their patriotic red, white, and blue scheme and their 1970s uniform design for a more modern look featuring a less saturated blue, black, and bronze, with the new logo featuring an attacking eagle with stars in its wings. This look would last (with slight changes) through the 2006–07 season.

The arrival of the Avalanche would also see the first new provider of on-ice jerseys in the NHL since 1989, when Nike ended its relationship with the Edmonton Oilers. For the next six seasons, CCM had been the sole provider of NHL jerseys; however, Starter, which had begun providing select NFL teams with their on-field jerseys and had also been selling consumer replica NHL jerseys, were tapped to provide Colorado's initial jerseys. Following the season, Starter would expand its presence in the NHL to nine other teams, while Nike would re-enter the league through the use of its subsidiary, Bauer Hockey.

== Arena changes ==
- The Boston Bruins moved from Boston Garden, where they spend the last 67 seasons, to the FleetCenter, with FleetBoston Financial acquiring the naming rights.
- The Calgary Flames' home arena, Olympic Saddledome, was renamed Canadian Airlines Saddledome as part of a new naming rights agreement with Canadian Airlines.
- The relocated Colorado Avalanche moved from Colisée de Québec in Quebec City, Quebec to McNichols Sports Arena in Denver, Colorado.
- The Edmonton Oilers' home arena, Northlands Coliseum, was renamed Edmonton Coliseum as part of a new leasing agreement between the team and the building's operator, Northlands, to instead reference the city.
- The Montreal Canadiens moved from the Montreal Forum to Molson Centre on March 16, 1996, with Molson Brewery acquiring the naming rights. With the Montreal Forum closed, Toronto's Maple Leaf Gardens became the last remaining arena from the Original Six era.
- The Ottawa Senators moved from Ottawa Civic Centre to the Palladium on January 17, 1996. It was then renamed the Corel Centre after Corel acquired the naming rights one month later.
- The Vancouver Canucks moved from Pacific Coliseum to General Motors Place, with General Motors Canada acquiring the naming rights.

== Regular season ==
=== All-Star Game ===
The All-Star Game was held on January 20, 1996, at the FleetCenter in Boston, home of the Boston Bruins.

=== Highlights ===
The Detroit Red Wings enjoyed a spectacular season, having finished the year as the Western Conference's top seed with 131 points, and at the time second only to the 1976–77 Montreal Canadiens, and setting the NHL record for most wins ever in the regular season (62). Neither mark was eclipsed until 27 years later, when the Boston Bruins achieved a record-breaking 65 wins and 135 points in the 2022–23 season. However, the Wings fell to the future Stanley Cup champion Avalanche in the 1996 Western Conference Finals, the sixth game of which marked the beginning of the heated Detroit-Colorado rivalry, which would last for years to come. The New Jersey Devils became the first team since the 1969–70 Montreal Canadiens to miss the playoffs after winning the Stanley Cup during the previous season.

Four teams allowed 300 or more goals in 1995–96. A total of three would do so from 1996–97 through 2003–04.

=== Final standings ===
==== Eastern Conference ====
Atlantic Division
No.		GP	W	L	T	GF	GA	Pts
1	**Philadelphia Flyers**	82	45	24	13	282	208	103
2	**New York Rangers**	82	41	27	14	272	237	96
3	**Florida Panthers**	82	41	31	10	254	234	92
4	**Washington Capitals**	82	39	32	11	234	204	89
5	**Tampa Bay Lightning**	82	38	32	12	238	248	88
6	New Jersey Devils	82	37	33	12	215	202	86
7	New York Islanders	82	22	50	10	229	315	54

Northeast Division
No.		GP	W	L	T	GF	GA	PTS
1	**Pittsburgh Penguins**	82	49	29	4	362	284	102
2	**Boston Bruins**	82	40	31	11	282	269	91
3	**Montreal Canadiens**	82	40	32	10	265	248	90
4	Hartford Whalers	82	34	39	9	237	259	77
5	Buffalo Sabres	82	33	42	7	247	262	72
6	Ottawa Senators	82	18	59	5	191	291	41

Eastern Conference
R		Div	GP	W	L	T	GF	GA	Pts
**1**	**Philadelphia Flyers**	**ATL**	**82**	**45**	**24**	**13**	**282**	**208**	**103**
**2**	**Pittsburgh Penguins**	**NE**	**82**	**49**	**29**	**4**	**362**	**284**	**102**
**3**	**New York Rangers**	**ATL**	**82**	**41**	**27**	**14**	**272**	**237**	**96**
**4**	**Florida Panthers**	**ATL**	**82**	**41**	**31**	**10**	**254**	**234**	**92**
**5**	**Boston Bruins**	**NE**	**82**	**40**	**31**	**11**	**282**	**269**	**91**
**6**	**Montreal Canadiens**	**NE**	**82**	**40**	**32**	**10**	**265**	**248**	**90**
**7**	**Washington Capitals**	**ATL**	**82**	**39**	**32**	**11**	**234**	**204**	**89**
**8**	**Tampa Bay Lightning**	**ATL**	**82**	**38**	**32**	**12**	**238**	**248**	**88**
9	New Jersey Devils	ATL	82	37	33	12	215	202	86
10	Hartford Whalers	NE	82	34	39	9	237	259	77
11	Buffalo Sabres	NE	82	33	42	7	247	262	73
12	New York Islanders	ATL	82	22	50	10	229	315	54
13	Ottawa Senators	NE	82	18	59	5	191	291	41

Divisions: ATL – Atlantic, NE – Northeast

bold – Qualified for playoffs

==== Western Conference ====
Central Division
No.		GP	W	L	T	GF	GA	Pts
1	**Detroit Red Wings**	82	62	13	7	325	181	131
2	**Chicago Blackhawks**	82	40	28	14	273	220	94
3	**Toronto Maple Leafs**	82	34	36	12	247	252	80
4	**St. Louis Blues**	82	32	34	16	219	248	80
5	**Winnipeg Jets**	82	36	40	6	275	291	78
6	Dallas Stars	82	26	42	14	227	280	66

Pacific Division
No.		GP	W	L	T	GF	GA	Pts
1	**Colorado Avalanche**	82	47	25	10	326	240	104
2	**Calgary Flames**	82	34	37	11	241	240	79
3	**Vancouver Canucks**	82	32	35	15	278	278	79
4	Mighty Ducks of Anaheim	82	35	39	8	234	247	78
5	Edmonton Oilers	82	30	44	8	240	304	68
6	Los Angeles Kings	82	24	40	18	256	302	66
7	San Jose Sharks	82	20	55	7	252	357	47

Western Conference
R		Div	GP	W	L	T	GF	GA	Pts
**1**	**p – Detroit Red Wings**	**CEN**	**82**	**62**	**13**	**7**	**325**	**181**	**131**
**2**	**Colorado Avalanche**	**PAC**	**82**	**47**	**25**	**10**	**326**	**240**	**104**
**3**	**Chicago Blackhawks**	**CEN**	**82**	**40**	**28**	**14**	**273**	**220**	**94**
**4**	**Toronto Maple Leafs**	**CEN**	**82**	**34**	**36**	**12**	**247**	**252**	**80**
**5**	**St. Louis Blues**	**CEN**	**82**	**32**	**34**	**16**	**219**	**248**	**80**
**6**	**Calgary Flames**	**PAC**	**82**	**34**	**37**	**11**	**241**	**240**	**79**
**7**	**Vancouver Canucks**	**PAC**	**82**	**32**	**35**	**15**	**278**	**278**	**79**
**8**	**Winnipeg Jets**	**CEN**	**82**	**36**	**40**	**6**	**275**	**291**	**78**
9	Mighty Ducks of Anaheim	PAC	82	35	39	8	234	247	78
10	Edmonton Oilers	PAC	82	30	44	8	240	304	68
11	Dallas Stars	CEN	82	26	42	14	227	280	66
12	Los Angeles Kings	PAC	82	24	40	18	256	302	66
13	San Jose Sharks	PAC	82	20	55	7	252	357	47

Divisions: CEN – Central, PAC – Pacific

bold – Qualified for playoffs; p – Won Presidents' Trophy

GP = Games Played, W = Wins, L = Losses, T = Ties, Pts = Points, GF = Goals for, GA = Goals against
Teams that qualified for the playoffs are highlighted in bold.

== Playoffs ==
=== Bracket ===
The top eight teams in each conference made the playoffs, with the two division winners seeded 1–2 based on regular season records, and the six remaining teams seeded 3–8. In each round, teams competed in a best-of-seven series (scores in the bracket indicate the number of games won in each best-of-seven series). The NHL used "re-seeding" instead of a fixed bracket playoff system. During the first three rounds, the highest remaining seed in each conference was matched against the lowest remaining seed, the second-highest remaining seed played the second-lowest remaining seed, and so forth. The higher-seeded team was awarded home-ice advantage. The two conference winners then advanced to the Stanley Cup Finals.

Conference quarterfinals	Conference semifinals
1	Philadelphia	4
8	Tampa Bay	2
1	Philadelphia	2
4	Florida	4
2	Pittsburgh	4
7	Washington	2
Eastern Conference
3	NY Rangers	4
6	Montreal	2
2	Pittsburgh	4
3	NY Rangers	1
4	Florida	4
5	Boston	1
1	Detroit	4
8	Winnipeg	2
1	Detroit	4
5	St. Louis	3
2	Colorado	4
7	Vancouver	2
Western Conference
3	Chicago	4
6	Calgary	0
2	Colorado	4
3	Chicago	2
4	Toronto	2
5	St. Louis	4

Conference finals
4	Florida	4
2	Pittsburgh	3
1	Detroit	2
2	Colorado	4

Stanley Cup Final
E4	Florida	0
W2	Colorado	4

== Awards ==
1995–96 NHL awards
Award	Recipient(s)	Runner(s)-up/finalists
Presidents' Trophy (best regular-season record)	Detroit Red Wings	Colorado Avalanche
Prince of Wales Trophy (Eastern Conference playoff champion)	Florida Panthers	Pittsburgh Penguins
Clarence S. Campbell Bowl (Western Conference playoff champion)	Colorado Avalanche	Detroit Red Wings
Alka-Seltzer Plus-Minus Award (best plus-minus statistic)	Vladimir Konstantinov (Detroit Red Wings)	Sergei Fedorov (Detroit Red Wings)
Art Ross Trophy (player with most points)	Mario Lemieux (Pittsburgh Penguins)	Jaromir Jagr (Pittsburgh Penguins)
Bill Masterton Memorial Trophy (perseverance, sportsmanship, and dedication)	Gary Roberts (Calgary Flames)	N/A
Calder Memorial Trophy (best first-year player)	Daniel Alfredsson (Ottawa Senators)	Daniel Alfredsson (Ottawa Senators); Eric Daze (Chicago Blackhawks); Ed Jovanovski (Florida Panthers)
Conn Smythe Trophy (most valuable player, playoffs)	Joe Sakic (Colorado Avalanche)	N/A
Frank J. Selke Trophy (best defensive forward)	Sergei Fedorov (Detroit Red Wings)	Sergei Fedorov (Detroit Red Wings); Ron Francis (Pittsburgh Penguins); Steve Yzerman (Detroit Red Wings)
Hart Memorial Trophy (most valuable player, regular season)	Mario Lemieux (Pittsburgh Penguins)	Mario Lemieux (Pittsburgh Penguins); Eric Lindros (Philadelphia Flyers); Mark Messier (New York Rangers)
Jack Adams Award (best coach)	Scotty Bowman (Detroit Red Wings)	Scotty Bowman (Detroit Red Wings); Terry Crisp (Tampa Bay Lightning); Doug MacLean (Florida Panthers)
James Norris Memorial Trophy (best defenceman)	Chris Chelios (Chicago Blackhawks)	Ray Bourque (Boston Bruins); Chris Chelios (Chicago Blackhawks); Brian Leetch (New York Rangers)
King Clancy Memorial Trophy (leadership and humanitarian contribution)	Kris King (Winnipeg Jets)	N/A
Lady Byng Memorial Trophy (sportsmanship and excellence)	Paul Kariya (Mighty Ducks of Anaheim)	Paul Kariya (Mighty Ducks of Anaheim); Adam Oates (Boston Bruins); Teemu Selanne (Winnipeg Jets/Mighty Ducks of Anaheim)
Lester B. Pearson Award (outstanding player)	Mario Lemieux (Pittsburgh Penguins)	N/A
Vezina Trophy (best goaltender)	Jim Carey (Washington Capitals)	Jim Carey (Washington Capitals); Chris Osgood (Detroit Red Wings); Daren Puppa (Tampa Bay Lightning)
William M. Jennings Trophy (goaltender(s) of team with fewest goals against)	Chris Osgood and Mike Vernon (Detroit Red Wings)	N/A

=== All-Star teams ===
First team	Position	Second team
Jim Carey, Washington Capitals	G	Chris Osgood, Detroit Red Wings
Chris Chelios, Chicago Blackhawks	D	Vladimir Konstantinov, Detroit Red Wings
Ray Bourque, Boston Bruins	D	Brian Leetch, New York Rangers
Mario Lemieux, Pittsburgh Penguins	C	Eric Lindros, Philadelphia Flyers
Jaromir Jagr, Pittsburgh Penguins	RW	Alexander Mogilny, Vancouver Canucks
Paul Kariya, Mighty Ducks of Anaheim	LW	John LeClair, Philadelphia Flyers

== Player statistics ==
=== Scoring leaders ===
Jaromir Jagr of the Pittsburgh Penguins broke the record for assists and points by a right winger in a single season. Mario Lemieux, a teammate of Jagr's, scored 161 points in 70 games, marking the NHL's final season in which a player would surpass the 150 point plateau during the 1990s. This also marked the final season of the 1990s where at least one NHL player would score at least 60 goals (Jagr and Lemieux).

Regular season

Player	Team	GP	G	A	Pts
Mario Lemieux	Pittsburgh	70	69	92	161
Jaromir Jagr	Pittsburgh	82	62	87	149
Joe Sakic	Colorado	82	51	69	120
Ron Francis	Pittsburgh	77	27	92	119
Peter Forsberg	Colorado	82	30	86	116
Eric Lindros	Philadelphia	73	47	68	115
Paul Kariya	Anaheim	82	50	58	108
Teemu Selanne	Winnipeg/ Anaheim	79	40	68	108
Alexander Mogilny	Vancouver	79	55	52	107
Sergei Fedorov	Detroit	78	39	68	107

Source: NHL.

Playoffs

Player	Team	GP	G	A	Pts
Joe Sakic	Colorado	22	18	16	34
Mario Lemieux	Pittsburgh	18	11	16	27
Jaromir Jagr	Pittsburgh	18	11	12	23
Valeri Kamensky	Colorado	22	10	12	22
Peter Forsberg	Colorado	22	10	11	21
Petr Nedved	Pittsburgh	18	10	10	20
Steve Yzerman	Detroit	18	8	12	20
Sergei Fedorov	Detroit	19	2	18	20
Sandis Ozolinsh	Colorado	22	5	14	19
Dave Lowry	Florida	22	10	7	17
Mike Ricci	Colorado	22	6	11	17
Adam Deadmarsh	Colorado	22	5	12	17

Note: GP = Games played, G = Goals, A = Assists, Pts = Points

=== Leading goaltenders ===
Regular season

Player	Team	GP	MIN	GA	SO	GAA	SV%
Ron Hextall	Philadelphia	53	3102	112	4	2.17	.913
Chris Osgood	Detroit	50	2933	106	5	2.17	.911
Jim Carey	Washington	71	4069	153	9	2.26	.906
Mike Vernon	Detroit	32	1855	70	3	2.26	.903
Martin Brodeur	New Jersey	77	4433	173	6	2.34	.911
Jeff Hackett	Chicago	35	2000	80	4	2.40	.916
Daren Puppa	Tampa Bay	57	3189	131	5	2.46	.918
Mike Richter	New York Rangers	41	2396	107	3	2.68	.912
John Vanbiesbrouck	Florida	57	3178	142	2	2.68	.904
Ed Belfour	Chicago	50	2956	135	1	2.74	.902

== Milestones ==
=== Debuts ===
The following is a list of players of note who played their first NHL game in 1995–96 (listed with their first team, asterisk(*) marks debut in playoffs):

- Martin Biron, Buffalo Sabres
- Jarome Iginla*, Calgary Flames
- Jere Lehtinen, Dallas Stars
- Miroslav Satan, Edmonton Oilers
- Ed Jovanovski, Florida Panthers
- Jeff O'Neill, Hartford Whalers
- Jose Theodore, Montreal Canadiens
- Saku Koivu, Montreal Canadiens
- Patrik Elias, New Jersey Devils
- Petr Sykora, New Jersey Devils
- Steve Sullivan, New Jersey Devils
- Bryan McCabe, New York Islanders
- Todd Bertuzzi, New York Islanders
- Daniel Alfredsson, Ottawa Senators
- Daymond Langkow, Tampa Bay Lightning
- Andrew Brunette, Washington Capitals
- Shane Doan, Winnipeg Jets

=== Last games ===
The following is a list of players of note who played their last game in the NHL in 1995–96 (listed with their last team):

- Cam Neely, Boston Bruins
- Troy Murray, Colorado Avalanche
- Bob Kudelski, Florida Panthers
- Jimmy Carson, Hartford Whalers
- Joe Cirella, Ottawa Senators (last active player to have been a member of the Colorado Rockies)
- Glenn Anderson, St. Louis Blues

== Coaches ==
=== Eastern Conference ===
Team	Coach	Comments
Boston Bruins	Steve Kasper	
Buffalo Sabres	Ted Nolan	
Florida Panthers	Doug MacLean	
Hartford Whalers	Paul Holmgren	Replaced midseason by Paul Maurice
Montreal Canadiens	Jacques Demers	Replaced early in the season by Mario Tremblay
New Jersey Devils	Jacques Lemaire	
New York Islanders	Mike Milbury	
New York Rangers	Colin Campbell	
Ottawa Senators	Rick Bowness	Replaced early in the season by Dave Allison, who would be replaced after 25 games by Jacques Martin
Philadelphia Flyers	Terry Murray	
Pittsburgh Penguins	Eddie Johnston	
Tampa Bay Lightning	Terry Crisp	
Washington Capitals	Jim Schoenfeld	

=== Western Conference ===
Team	Coach	Comments
Mighty Ducks of Anaheim	Ron Wilson	
Calgary Flames	Pierre Page	
Chicago Blackhawks	Craig Hartsburg	
Colorado Avalanche	Marc Crawford	
Dallas Stars	Bob Gainey	Replaced midseason by Ken Hitchcock
Detroit Red Wings	Scotty Bowman	
Edmonton Oilers	Ron Low	
Los Angeles Kings	Larry Robinson	
St. Louis Blues	Mike Keenan	
San Jose Sharks	Kevin Constantine	Replaced early in the season by Jim Wiley
Toronto Maple Leafs	Pat Burns	Replaced late in the season by Nick Beverley
Vancouver Canucks	Rick Ley	Replaced late in the season by Pat Quinn
Winnipeg Jets	Terry Simpson	

== Broadcasting ==
=== Canada ===
This was the eighth season that the league's Canadian national broadcast rights were split between TSN and Hockey Night in Canada on CBC. During the regular season, Saturday night games aired on CBC, while TSN primarily had Monday and Thursday night games. Coverage of the Stanley Cup playoffs was primarily on CBC, with TSN airing first round all-U.S. series.

=== United States ===
This was the second season of the league's five-year U.S. national broadcast rights deals with Fox and ESPN. Both ESPN and ESPN2 aired weeknight games throughout the regular season, and Fox had the All-Star Game and weekly regional telecasts on six selected weekend afternoons between January and April. During the first two rounds of the playoffs, ESPN and ESPN2 aired selected games, while Fox had Sunday regional telecasts. Each U.S. team's regional broadcaster produced local coverage of first and second-round games (except for those games on Fox). Fox's Sunday telecasts continued into the Conference Finals, while ESPN had the rest of the third-round games. The Stanley Cup Finals were also split between Fox and ESPN.

== See also ==
- 1995 in sports
- 1995 NHL entry draft
- 1995-96 NHL transactions
- 1996 in sports
- 46th National Hockey League All-Star Game
