= 1995–96 Boston Bruins season =

NHL team season

1995–96 Boston Bruins
- Division: 2nd Northeast
- Conference: 5th Eastern
- 1995–96 record: 40–31–11
- Home record: 22–14–5
- Road record: 18–17–6
- Goals for: 282
- Goals against: 269

Team information
- General manager: Harry Sinden
- Coach: Steve Kasper
- Captain: Ray Bourque
- Arena: Fleet Center
- Average attendance: 17,474 (97.8%); Total: 716,443
- Minor league affiliates: Providence Bruins (AHL); Charlotte Checkers (ECHL)

Team leaders
- Goals: Cam Neely (26)
- Assists: Adam Oates (67)
- Points: Adam Oates (92)
- Penalty minutes: Dean Chynoweth (88)
- Plus/minus: Ray Bourque (+31)
- Wins: Bill Ranford (21)
- Goals against average: Bill Ranford (2.83)

The 1995–96 Boston Bruins season was the team's 72nd season. It was the Bruins' first season at Fleet Center, which replaced Boston Garden as their home venue.

== Regular season ==
During the regular season, the Bruins led the league in shots on goal with 2,838.

=== Final standings ===
Northeast Division
No.		GP	W	L	T	GF	GA	PTS
1	**Pittsburgh Penguins**	82	49	29	4	362	284	102
2	**Boston Bruins**	82	40	31	11	282	269	91
3	**Montreal Canadiens**	82	40	32	10	265	248	90
4	Hartford Whalers	82	34	39	9	237	259	77
5	Buffalo Sabres	82	33	42	7	247	262	72
6	Ottawa Senators	82	18	59	5	191	291	41

Eastern Conference
R		Div	GP	W	L	T	GF	GA	Pts
**1**	**Philadelphia Flyers**	**ATL**	**82**	**45**	**24**	**13**	**282**	**208**	**103**
**2**	**Pittsburgh Penguins**	**NE**	**82**	**49**	**29**	**4**	**362**	**284**	**102**
**3**	**New York Rangers**	**ATL**	**82**	**41**	**27**	**14**	**272**	**237**	**96**
**4**	**Florida Panthers**	**ATL**	**82**	**41**	**31**	**10**	**254**	**234**	**92**
**5**	**Boston Bruins**	**NE**	**82**	**40**	**31**	**11**	**282**	**269**	**91**
**6**	**Montreal Canadiens**	**NE**	**82**	**40**	**32**	**10**	**265**	**248**	**90**
**7**	**Washington Capitals**	**ATL**	**82**	**39**	**32**	**11**	**234**	**204**	**89**
**8**	**Tampa Bay Lightning**	**ATL**	**82**	**38**	**32**	**12**	**238**	**248**	**88**
9	New Jersey Devils	ATL	82	37	33	12	215	202	86
10	Hartford Whalers	NE	82	34	39	9	237	259	77
11	Buffalo Sabres	NE	82	33	42	7	247	262	73
12	New York Islanders	ATL	82	22	50	10	229	315	54
13	Ottawa Senators	NE	82	18	59	5	191	291	41

Divisions: ATL – Atlantic, NE – Northeast

bold – Qualified for playoffs

== Playoffs ==
The Bruins qualified for the playoffs for the 29th consecutive season, an NHL record that still stands (as of the 2022–23 season). The streak ended one season later. The Bruins were seeded 5th in the Eastern Conference and faced the 4th-seeded Florida Panthers in the Eastern Conference Quarterfinals. The Bruins lost the series in five games after falling behind three games to none. The Panthers went on to lose to the Colorado Avalanche in the Stanley Cup Finals.

== Schedule and results ==
=== Regular season ===
1995–96 regular season
October: 3–5–2 (home: 2–2–1; road: 1–3–1)

Game	Date	Score	Opponent	Record	Recap
1	October 7, 1995	4–4 OT	New York Islanders (1995–96)	0–0–1	T
2	October 9, 1995	5–3	Buffalo Sabres (1995–96)	1–0–1	W
3	October 11, 1995	1–3	@ Colorado Avalanche (1995–96)	1–1–1	L
4	October 12, 1995	6–6 OT	@ San Jose Sharks (1995–96)	1–1–2	T
5	October 14, 1995	5–6	@ Dallas Stars (1995–96)	1–2–2	L
6	October 17, 1995	7–4	@ St. Louis Blues (1995–96)	2–2–2	W
7	October 21, 1995	2–4	@ Detroit Red Wings (1995–96)	2–3–2	L
8	October 26, 1995	2–4	Washington Capitals (1995–96)	2–4–2	L
9	October 28, 1995	3–0	Hartford Whalers (1995–96)	3–4–2	W
10	October 31, 1995	1–3	Montreal Canadiens (1995–96)	3–5–2	L

November: 5–5–2 (home: 4–3–1; road: 1–2–1)

Game	Date	Score	Opponent	Record	Recap
11	November 2, 1995	5–6 OT	Detroit Red Wings (1995–96)	3–6–2	L
12	November 4, 1995	1–4	@ Montreal Canadiens (1995–96)	3–7–2	L
13	November 7, 1995	4–3	@ Washington Capitals (1995–96)	4–7–2	W
14	November 9, 1995	4–3	Ottawa Senators (1995–96)	5–7–2	W
15	November 11, 1995	1–3	Toronto Maple Leafs (1995–96)	5–8–2	L
16	November 14, 1995	3–5	@ Tampa Bay Lightning (1995–96)	5–9–2	L
17	November 16, 1995	2–2 OT	New Jersey Devils (1995–96)	5–9–3	T
18	November 18, 1995	5–2	St. Louis Blues (1995–96)	6–9–3	W
19	November 21, 1995	5–4	Winnipeg Jets (1995–96)	7–9–3	W
20	November 24, 1995	2–1	Los Angeles Kings (1995–96)	8–9–3	W
21	November 25, 1995	3–3 OT	@ Ottawa Senators (1995–96)	8–9–4	T
22	November 30, 1995	6–9	Pittsburgh Penguins (1995–96)	8–10–4	L

December: 7–4–1 (home: 5–0–0; road: 2–4–1)

Game	Date	Score	Opponent	Record	Recap
23	December 2, 1995	6–4	Buffalo Sabres (1995–96)	9–10–4	W
24	December 3, 1995	1–6	@ Philadelphia Flyers (1995–96)	9–11–4	L
25	December 5, 1995	6–4	Dallas Stars (1995–96)	10–11–4	W
26	December 8, 1995	1–3	@ Tampa Bay Lightning (1995–96)	10–12–4	L
27	December 9, 1995	1–3	@ Florida Panthers (1995–96)	10–13–4	L
28	December 13, 1995	2–4	@ New York Rangers (1995–96)	10–14–4	L
29	December 14, 1995	6–4	Florida Panthers (1995–96)	11–14–4	W
30	December 16, 1995	6–3	Calgary Flames (1995–96)	12–14–4	W
31	December 22, 1995	3–2 OT	@ Buffalo Sabres (1995–96)	13–14–4	W
32	December 23, 1995	7–5	Tampa Bay Lightning (1995–96)	14–14–4	W
33	December 26, 1995	3–3 OT	@ New York Islanders (1995–96)	14–14–5	T
34	December 31, 1995	5–3	@ Winnipeg Jets (1995–96)	15–14–5	W

January: 6–6–1 (home: 4–4–0; road: 2–2–1)

Game	Date	Score	Opponent	Record	Recap
35	January 2, 1996	2–5	Chicago Blackhawks (1995–96)	15–15–5	L
36	January 3, 1996	4–4 OT	@ Toronto Maple Leafs (1995–96)	15–15–6	T
37	January 6, 1996	5–2	Hartford Whalers (1995–96)	16–15–6	W
38	January 9, 1996	0–3	Colorado Avalanche (1995–96)	16–16–6	L
39	January 11, 1996	7–2	Mighty Ducks of Anaheim (1995–96)	17–16–6	W
40	January 13, 1996	3–2	New Jersey Devils (1995–96)	18–16–6	W
41	January 15, 1996	0–6	Vancouver Canucks (1995–96)	18–17–6	L
42	January 16, 1996	4–2	@ New Jersey Devils (1995–96)	19–17–6	W
43	January 22, 1996	6–7 OT	@ Pittsburgh Penguins (1995–96)	19–18–6	L
44	January 25, 1996	4–3	Tampa Bay Lightning (1995–96)	20–18–6	W
45	January 27, 1996	3–5	New York Rangers (1995–96)	20–19–6	L
46	January 28, 1996	4–5	@ Montreal Canadiens (1995–96)	20–20–6	L
47	January 31, 1996	3–1	@ Ottawa Senators (1995–96)	21–20–6	W

February: 6–6–2 (home: 1–2–1; road: 5–4–1)

Game	Date	Score	Opponent	Record	Recap
48	February 1, 1996	2–2 OT	Florida Panthers (1995–96)	21–20–7	T
49	February 3, 1996	4–2	Buffalo Sabres (1995–96)	22–20–7	W
50	February 6, 1996	5–6	@ Pittsburgh Penguins (1995–96)	22–21–7	L
51	February 7, 1996	1–2 OT	@ Buffalo Sabres (1995–96)	22–22–7	L
52	February 10, 1996	2–6	Philadelphia Flyers (1995–96)	22–23–7	L
53	February 14, 1996	3–0	@ Hartford Whalers (1995–96)	23–23–7	W
54	February 15, 1996	0–3	@ Chicago Blackhawks (1995–96)	23–24–7	L
55	February 17, 1996	4–1	@ Vancouver Canucks (1995–96)	24–24–7	W
56	February 19, 1996	3–3 OT	@ Los Angeles Kings (1995–96)	24–24–8	T
57	February 21, 1996	3–4 OT	@ Mighty Ducks of Anaheim (1995–96)	24–25–8	L
58	February 23, 1996	7–4	@ Edmonton Oilers (1995–96)	25–25–8	W
59	February 24, 1996	2–1	@ Calgary Flames (1995–96)	26–25–8	W
60	February 27, 1996	3–4 OT	Edmonton Oilers (1995–96)	26–26–8	L
61	February 28, 1996	3–1	@ New York Rangers (1995–96)	27–26–8	W

March: 9–4–1 (home: 4–3–1; road: 5–1–0)

Game	Date	Score	Opponent	Record	Recap
62	March 2, 1996	0–2	Washington Capitals (1995–96)	27–27–8	L
63	March 5, 1996	3–5	@ New York Islanders (1995–96)	27–28–8	L
64	March 7, 1996	4–3	New York Islanders (1995–96)	28–28–8	W
65	March 9, 1996	3–2	Philadelphia Flyers (1995–96)	29–28–8	W
66	March 10, 1996	4–1	@ Florida Panthers (1995–96)	30–28–8	W
67	March 14, 1996	4–2	Pittsburgh Penguins (1995–96)	31–28–8	W
68	March 15, 1996	5–2	@ Washington Capitals (1995–96)	32–28–8	W
69	March 18, 1996	3–3 OT	San Jose Sharks (1995–96)	32–28–9	T
70	March 20, 1996	2–1	@ New Jersey Devils (1995–96)	33–28–9	W
71	March 21, 1996	3–1	Ottawa Senators (1995–96)	34–28–9	W
72	March 23, 1996	4–5	New York Rangers (1995–96)	34–29–9	L
73	March 27, 1996	6–5 OT	@ Hartford Whalers (1995–96)	35–29–9	W
74	March 28, 1996	3–4 OT	Montreal Canadiens (1995–96)	35–30–9	L
75	March 31, 1996	6–5	@ Buffalo Sabres (1995–96)	36–30–9	W

April: 4–1–2 (home: 2–0–1; road: 2–1–1)

Game	Date	Score	Opponent	Record	Recap
76	April 1, 1996	1–1 OT	@ Ottawa Senators (1995–96)	36–30–10	T
77	April 3, 1996	4–1	@ Montreal Canadiens (1995–96)	37–30–10	W
78	April 4, 1996	3–3 OT	Montreal Canadiens (1995–96)	37–30–11	T
79	April 7, 1996	4–2	@ Philadelphia Flyers (1995–96)	38–30–11	W
80	April 11, 1996	3–2	Hartford Whalers (1995–96)	39–30–11	W
81	April 13, 1996	0–2	@ Hartford Whalers (1995–96)	39–31–11	L
82	April 14, 1996	6–5	Pittsburgh Penguins (1995–96)	40–31–11	W

Legend: W Win (2 points) L Loss (0 points) T Tie (1 point)

=== Playoffs ===
1996 Stanley Cup playoffs
Eastern Conference Quarterfinals vs. (4) Florida Panthers – Panthers win 4–1

Game	Date	Score	Opponent	Attendance	Series	Recap
1	April 17, 1996	3–6	@ Florida Panthers	14,703	Panthers lead 1–0	L
2	April 22, 1996	2–6	@ Florida Panthers	14,703	Panthers lead 2–0	L
3	April 24, 1996	2–4	Florida Panthers	14,922	Panthers lead 3–0	L
4	April 25, 1996	6–2	Florida Panthers	14,810	Panthers lead 3–1	W
5	April 27, 1996	3–4	@ Florida Panthers	14,703	Panthers win 4–1	L

Legend: W Win L Loss

== Player statistics ==
=== Scoring ===
- Position abbreviations: C = Center; D = Defense; G = Goaltender; LW = Left wing; RW = Right wing
- † = Joined team via a transaction (e.g., trade, waivers, signing) during the season. Stats reflect time with the Bruins only.
- ‡ = Left team via a transaction (e.g., trade, waivers, release) during the season. Stats reflect time with the Bruins only.

No.	Player	Pos	Regular season						Playoffs					
No.	Player	Pos	GP	G	A	Pts	+/-	PIM	GP	G	A	Pts	+/-	PIM
12	Adam Oates	C	70	25	67	92	16	18	5	2	5	7	−3	2
77	Ray Bourque	D	82	20	62	82	31	58	5	1	6	7	−4	2
16 (Note: Stumpel wore number 22 until Tocchet was acquired.)	Jozef Stumpel	C	76	18	36	54	−8	14	5	1	2	3	−2	0
14	Shawn McEachern	LW	82	24	29	53	−5	34	5	2	1	3	−2	8
21	Ted Donato	LW	82	23	26	49	6	46	5	1	2	3	−3	2
8	Cam Neely	RW	49	26	20	46	3	31	—	—	—	—	—	—
20	Todd Elik	LW	59	13	33	46	2	40	4	0	2	2	−1	16
17	Dave Reid	C	63	23	21	44	14	4	5	0	2	2	−3	2
45	Sandy Moger	RW	80	15	14	29	−9	65	5	2	2	4	−1	12
23	Steve Heinze	RW	76	16	12	28	−3	43	5	1	1	2	1	4
32	Don Sweeney	D	77	4	24	28	−4	42	5	0	2	2	−3	6
22	Rick Tocchet†	RW	27	16	8	24	7	64	5	4	0	4	−7	21
25	Kevin Stevens‡	LW	41	10	13	23	1	49	—	—	—	—	—	—
27	Steve Leach‡	RW	59	9	13	22	−4	86	—	—	—	—	—	—
46	Kyle McLaren	D	74	5	12	17	16	73	5	0	0	0	−3	14
42	Tim Sweeney	LW	41	8	8	16	4	14	1	0	0	0	0	2
11	Joe Mullen	RW	37	8	7	15	−2	0	—	—	—	—	—	—
34	Rick Zombo	D	67	4	10	14	−7	53	—	—	—	—	—	—
38	Jon Rohloff	D	79	1	12	13	−8	59	5	1	2	3	−3	2
10	Ron Sutter†	C	18	5	7	12	10	24	5	0	0	0	−2	8
19	Mariusz Czerkawski‡	RW	33	5	6	11	−11	10	—	—	—	—	—	—
28 (Note: Chynoweth wore number 47 in his first two games.)	Dean Chynoweth†	D	35	2	5	7	−1	88	4	0	0	0	−2	24
37	Clayton Beddoes	C	39	1	6	7	−5	44	—	—	—	—	—	—
41	Phil Von Stefenelli	D	27	0	4	4	2	16	—	—	—	—	—	—
30	Bill Ranford†	G	40	0	2	2		0	4	0	0	0		0
6	Alexei Kasatonov	D	19	1	0	1	1	12	—	—	—	—	—	—
39	Scott Bailey	G	11	0	0	0		0	—	—	—	—	—	—
1	Craig Billington	G	27	0	0	0		2	1	0	0	0		2
40	Mark Cornforth	D	6	0	0	0	4	4	—	—	—	—	—	—
36	John Gruden	D	14	0	0	0	−3	4	3	0	1	1	0	0
47	Ryan Hughes	C	3	0	0	0	0	0	—	—	—	—	—	—
31	Blaine Lacher	G	12	0	0	0		4	—	—	—	—	—	—
44	Davis Payne	LW	7	0	0	0	0	7	—	—	—	—	—	—
29	Marc Potvin	RW	27	0	0	0	−2	12	5	0	1	1	−2	18
49	Andre Roy	LW	3	0	0	0	0	0	—	—	—	—	—	—
19	Kevin Sawyer†	LW	2	0	0	0	1	5	—	—	—	—	—	—
48	Steve Staios†	D	12	0	0	0	−5	4	3	0	0	0	−1	0
26	Cam Stewart	C	6	0	0	0	−2	0	5	1	0	1	0	2
35	Robbie Tallas	G	1	0	0	0		0	—	—	—	—	—	—

=== Goaltending ===
- † = Joined team via a transaction (e.g., trade, waivers, signing) during the season. Stats reflect time with the Bruins only.

No.	Player	Regular season											Playoffs									
No.	Player	GP	GS	W	L	T	SA	GA	GAA	SV%	SO	TOI	GP	GS	W	L	SA	GA	GAA	SV%	SO	TOI
30	Bill Ranford†	40	39	21	12	4	1,030	109	2.84	.894	1	2,306:31	4	4	1	3	112	16	4.01	.857	0	239:15
1	Craig Billington	27	24	10	13	3	594	79	3.44	.867	1	1,379:42	1	1	0	1	28	6	6.00	.786	0	60:00
39	Scott Bailey	11	8	5	1	2	264	31	3.26	.883	0	570:57	—	—	—	—	—	—	—	—	—	—
31	Blaine Lacher	12	10	3	5	2	284	44	3.94	.845	0	670:45	—	—	—	—	—	—	—	—	—	—
35	Robbie Tallas	1	1	1	0	0	29	3	3.00	.897	0	60:00	—	—	—	—	—	—	—	—	—	—

== Awards and records ==
=== Awards ===
Type	Award/honor	Recipient	Ref
League (annual)	Lester Patrick Trophy	Milt Schmidt	
League (annual)	NHL All-Rookie Team	Kyle McLaren (Defense)	
League (annual)	NHL First All-Star team	Ray Bourque (Defense)	
League (in-season)	NHL All-Star Game selection	Ray Bourque (Note: Bourque was voted to the starting lineup.)	
League (in-season)	NHL All-Star Game selection	Cam Neely	
Team	Elizabeth C. Dufresne Trophy	Ray Bourque	
Team	Seventh Player Award	Kyle McLaren	
Team	Three Stars Awards	Adam Oates (1st)	
Team	Three Stars Awards	Ray Bourque (2nd)	
Team	Three Stars Awards	Bill Ranford (3rd)	

=== Milestones ===
Milestone	Player	Date	Ref
First game	Kyle McLaren	October 7, 1995	
First game	Phil Von Stefenelli	October 26, 1995	
First game	Ryan Hughes	November 4, 1995	
First game	Mark Cornforth	November 4, 1995	
First game	Scott Bailey	November 16, 1995	
First game	Clayton Beddoes	December 2, 1995	
First game	Andre Roy	February 3, 1996	
First game	Davis Payne	February 7, 1996	
First game	Rob Tallas	March 7, 1996	
First game	Steve Staios	March 21, 1996	
1,000th game played	Joe Mullen	March 5, 1996	
500th game played	Bill Ranford	March 5, 1996	

== Transactions ==
=== Trades ===
Date	Details	
August 1, 1995	To Pittsburgh Penguins Glen Murray; Bryan Smolinski; 1996 3rd-round pick (#72 overall)	To Boston Bruins Shawn McEachern; Kevin Stevens
August 17, 1995	To Tampa Bay Lightning David Shaw	To Boston Bruins 1996 DET 3rd-round pick (#80 overall)
October 2, 1995	To St. Louis Blues Fred Knipscheer	To Boston Bruins Darin Kimble; Rick Zombo
December 9, 1995	To New York Islanders 1996 5th-round pick (#128 overall)	To Boston Bruins Dean Chynoweth
January 11, 1996	To Edmonton Oilers Mariusz Czerkawski; Rights to Sean Brown; 1996 1st-round pick (#19 overall)	To Boston Bruins Bill Ranford
January 25, 1996	To Los Angeles Kings Kevin Stevens	To Boston Bruins Rick Tocchet
March 8, 1996	To St. Louis Blues Stephen Leach	To Boston Bruins Kevin Sawyer; Steve Staios

=== Free agents ===
Date	Player	Team
June 26, 1995	Mark Major	to Detroit Red Wings
July 24, 1995	Brett Harkins	to Florida Panthers
August 5, 1995	Sergei Zholtok	to Las Vegas Thunder (IHL)
August 8, 1995	Todd Elik	from St. Louis Blues
August 9, 1995	Ted Crowley	
August 9, 1995	Jeff Serowik	to Chicago Blackhawks
August 9, 1995	Peter Taglianetti	from Pittsburgh Penguins
August 9, 1995	Tim Sweeney	from Mighty Ducks of Anaheim
August 10, 1995	Peter Allen	to Pittsburgh Penguins
August 22, 1995	Jamie Huscroft	to Calgary Flames
September 6, 1995	Davis Payne	
September 8, 1995	Joe Mullen	from Pittsburgh Penguins
September 13, 1995	Rob Tallas	
October 6, 1995	Mark Cornforth	
October 6, 1995	Ryan Hughes	
December 28, 1995	John Blue	to Buffalo Sabres
March 9, 1996	Ron Sutter	from New York Islanders
June 7, 1996	Kirk Nielsen	

=== Waivers ===
Date	Player	Team
October 2, 1995	Brent Hughes	to Buffalo Sabres in waiver draft

== Draft picks ==
Boston's draft picks at the 1995 NHL entry draft held at the Edmonton Coliseum in Edmonton, Alberta.

Round	#	Player	Position	Nationality	College/junior/club team (league)
1^{1}	9	Kyle McLaren	D	Canada	Tacoma Rockets (WHL)
1	21	Sean Brown	D	Canada	Belleville Bulls (OHL)
2	47	Paxton Schafer	G	Canada	Medicine Hat Tigers (WHL)
3	73	Bill McCauley	D	United States	Detroit Jr. Red Wings (OHL)
4	99	Cameron Mann	RW	Canada	Peterborough Petes (OHL)
6	151	Evgeny Shaldybin	D	Russia	Torpedo Yaroslavl (Russia)
7	177	P. J. Axelsson	LW	Sweden	Frölunda HC (Sweden)
8	203	Sergei Zhukov	D	Russia	Torpedo Yaroslavl (Russia)
9	229	Jonathan Murphy	D	Canada	Peterborough Petes (OHL)

Notes

1. The Bruins acquired this pick as the result of a trade on August 26, 1994 that sent Glen Wesley to Hartford in exchange for first-round picks in 1996, 1997 and this pick.
- The Bruins fifth-round pick went to the Detroit Red Wings as the result of a trade on January 17, 1994 that sent Vincent Riendeau to Boston in exchange for this pick (125th overall).

== See also ==
- 1995–96 NHL season
