= 1995–96 Winnipeg Jets season =

NHL hockey team season

1995–96 Winnipeg Jets
- Division: 5th Central
- Conference: 8th Western
- 1995–96 record: 36–40–6
- Home record: 22–16–3
- Road record: 14–24–3
- Goals for: 275
- Goals against: 291

Team information
- General manager: John Paddock
- Coach: Terry Simpson
- Captain: Kris King
- Arena: Winnipeg Arena
- Average attendance: 11,316
- Minor league affiliate: Springfield Falcons

Team leaders
- Goals: Keith Tkachuk (50)
- Assists: Keith Tkachuk (48); Teemu Selanne (48)
- Points: Keith Tkachuk (98)
- Penalty minutes: Dave Manson (205)
- Plus/minus: Keith Tkachuk (+11)
- Wins: Nikolai Khabibulin (26)
- Goals against average: Nikolai Khabibulin (3.13)

The 1995–96 Winnipeg Jets season was the team's 24th and final season of the original Winnipeg Jets before the franchise's assets were moved to Phoenix, Arizona, and renamed the Phoenix Coyotes.

The Jets managed to qualify for the eighth and final playoff Western Conference playoff berth in their final season in Winnipeg. The Jets were eliminated in the first round in six games by the Presidents' Trophy winners, the Detroit Red Wings.

The NHL returned to Winnipeg following the 2010–11 season, when the Atlanta Thrashers became the "new" Winnipeg Jets. In 2026, the present-day Jets reclaimed the original Jets' records and statistics from 1972 to 1996. As a result, the Jets franchise was retconned as inactive from 1996 to 1999 (as the Thrashers) while the Coyotes were reclassified as an expansion team starting in 1996–97.

== Off-season ==
The interim label was removed from head coach Terry Simpson's title on June 20.

The Jets picked Shane Doan of the Kamloops Blazers as their first-round pick, seventh overall.

Due to contractual disagreements, Keith Tkachuk was replaced as captain by Kris King.

== Regular season ==
Their 36 wins were the highest since the Jets won 40 games during the 1992–93 season.

=== Season standings ===
Central Division
No.		GP	W	L	T	GF	GA	Pts
1	**Detroit Red Wings**	82	62	13	7	325	181	131
2	**Chicago Blackhawks**	82	40	28	14	273	220	94
3	**Toronto Maple Leafs**	82	34	36	12	247	252	80
4	**St. Louis Blues**	82	32	34	16	219	248	80
5	**Winnipeg Jets**	82	36	40	6	275	291	78
6	Dallas Stars	82	26	42	14	227	280	66

Note: GP = Games played; W = Wins; L = Losses; T = Ties; GF = Goals for; GA = Goals against; Pts = Points
Bolded teams qualified for the playoffs.

Western Conference
R		Div	GP	W	L	T	GF	GA	Pts
**1**	**p – Detroit Red Wings**	**CEN**	**82**	**62**	**13**	**7**	**325**	**181**	**131**
**2**	**Colorado Avalanche**	**PAC**	**82**	**47**	**25**	**10**	**326**	**240**	**104**
**3**	**Chicago Blackhawks**	**CEN**	**82**	**40**	**28**	**14**	**273**	**220**	**94**
**4**	**Toronto Maple Leafs**	**CEN**	**82**	**34**	**36**	**12**	**247**	**252**	**80**
**5**	**St. Louis Blues**	**CEN**	**82**	**32**	**34**	**16**	**219**	**248**	**80**
**6**	**Calgary Flames**	**PAC**	**82**	**34**	**37**	**11**	**241**	**240**	**79**
**7**	**Vancouver Canucks**	**PAC**	**82**	**32**	**35**	**15**	**278**	**278**	**79**
**8**	**Winnipeg Jets**	**CEN**	**82**	**36**	**40**	**6**	**275**	**291**	**78**
9	Mighty Ducks of Anaheim	PAC	82	35	39	8	234	247	78
10	Edmonton Oilers	PAC	82	30	44	8	240	304	68
11	Dallas Stars	CEN	82	26	42	14	227	280	66
12	Los Angeles Kings	PAC	82	24	40	18	256	302	66
13	San Jose Sharks	PAC	82	20	55	7	252	357	47

Divisions: CEN – Central, PAC – Pacific

bold – Qualified for playoffs; p – Won Presidents' Trophy

== Playoffs ==
The Jets lost their first round series 4–2 to the Detroit Red Wings. Winnipeg played their last-ever game on April 28, 1996, a home playoff loss to the Red Wings, 4–1. Norm Maciver scored the last goal in original Jets history.

== Schedule and results ==
=== Regular season ===
1995–96 regular season
October: 6–4–2 (home: 4–0–2; road: 2–4–0)

Game	Date	Score	Opponent	Record	Attendance	Recap
1	October 7, 1995	7–5	Dallas Stars (1995–96)	1–0–0	13,914	W
2	October 9, 1995	4–3	Mighty Ducks of Anaheim (1995–96)	2–0–0	7,856	W
3	October 11, 1995	4–6	@ New York Rangers (1995–96)	2–1–0	18,200	L
4	October 12, 1995	1–4	@ New Jersey Devils (1995–96)	2–2–0	10,392	L
5	October 15, 1995	5–5 OT	Detroit Red Wings (1995–96)	2–2–1	9,399	T
6	October 17, 1995	5–2	Tampa Bay Lightning (1995–96)	3–2–1	6,770	W
7	October 19, 1995	3–3 OT	San Jose Sharks (1995–96)	3–2–2	9,001	T
8	October 22, 1995	2–6	@ Mighty Ducks of Anaheim (1995–96)	3–3–2	17,033	L
9	October 25, 1995	6–1	@ San Jose Sharks (1995–96)	4–3–2	17,190	W
10	October 27, 1995	5–7	@ Edmonton Oilers (1995–96)	4–4–2	10,527	L
11	October 28, 1995	4–1	@ Vancouver Canucks (1995–96)	5–4–2	18,184	W
12	October 30, 1995	3–2	Detroit Red Wings (1995–96)	6–4–2	7,905	W

November: 6–6–0 (home: 4–3–0; road: 2–3–0)

Game	Date	Score	Opponent	Record	Attendance	Recap
13	November 1, 1995	2–4	Toronto Maple Leafs (1995–96)	6–5–2	8,219	L
14	November 3, 1995	2–5	Colorado Avalanche (1995–96)	6–6–2	13,111	L
15	November 5, 1995	4–3	@ Buffalo Sabres (1995–96)	7–6–2	10,772	W
16	November 10, 1995	2–3	@ St. Louis Blues (1995–96)	7–7–2	18,303	L
17	November 14, 1995	6–5 OT	Chicago Blackhawks (1995–96)	8–7–2	9,716	W
18	November 17, 1995	6–3	New York Rangers (1995–96)	9–7–2	11,306	W
19	November 18, 1995	1–2	@ Toronto Maple Leafs (1995–96)	9–8–2	15,746	L
20	November 21, 1995	4–5	@ Boston Bruins (1995–96)	9–9–2	17,167	L
21	November 22, 1995	3–1	@ Ottawa Senators (1995–96)	10–9–2	8,426	W
22	November 26, 1995	4–0	Edmonton Oilers (1995–96)	11–9–2	10,070	W
23	November 28, 1995	4–3	Toronto Maple Leafs (1995–96)	12–9–2	9,694	W
24	November 30, 1995	1–4	St. Louis Blues (1995–96)	12–10–2	9,222	L

December: 4–9–1 (home: 4–3–1; road: 0–6–0)

Game	Date	Score	Opponent	Record	Attendance	Recap
25	December 2, 1995	2–2 OT	Chicago Blackhawks (1995–96)	12–10–3	10,770	T
26	December 3, 1995	5–2	Calgary Flames (1995–96)	13–10–3	8,721	W
27	December 6, 1995	3–6	@ Los Angeles Kings (1995–96)	13–11–3	12,105	L
28	December 7, 1995	3–5	@ San Jose Sharks (1995–96)	13–12–3	17,190	L
29	December 10, 1995	1–6	Washington Capitals (1995–96)	13–13–3	8,317	L
30	December 12, 1995	5–6	Montreal Canadiens (1995–96)	13–14–3	14,321	L
31	December 15, 1995	9–4	Edmonton Oilers (1995–96)	14–14–3	8,504	W
32	December 17, 1995	1–3	@ Chicago Blackhawks (1995–96)	14–15–3	18,385	L
33	December 19, 1995	3–6	@ Tampa Bay Lightning (1995–96)	14–16–3	16,581	L
34	December 21, 1995	1–6	@ Florida Panthers (1995–96)	14–17–3	13,601	L
35	December 23, 1995	2–1	St. Louis Blues (1995–96)	15–17–3	9,527	W
36	December 28, 1995	3–4	@ Chicago Blackhawks (1995–96)	15–18–3	21,701	L
37	December 29, 1995	5–3	New Jersey Devils (1995–96)	16–18–3	13,003	W
38	December 31, 1995	3–5	Boston Bruins (1995–96)	16–19–3	15,513	L

January: 5–5–1 (home: 1–3–0; road: 4–2–1)

Game	Date	Score	Opponent	Record	Attendance	Recap
39	January 3, 1996	5–4	@ Los Angeles Kings (1995–96)	17–19–3	12,675	W
40	January 5, 1996	4–5	@ Dallas Stars (1995–96)	17–20–3	15,412	L
41	January 8, 1996	6–4	@ Detroit Red Wings (1995–96)	18–20–3	19,825	W
42	January 10, 1996	4–1	Buffalo Sabres (1995–96)	19–20–3	9,326	W
43	January 12, 1996	2–3	Hartford Whalers (1995–96)	19–21–3	9,709	L
44	January 14, 1996	4–6	Mighty Ducks of Anaheim (1995–96)	19–22–3	10,661	L
45	January 16, 1996	1–1 OT	@ Washington Capitals (1995–96)	19–22–4	10,316	T
46	January 17, 1996	4–2	@ Toronto Maple Leafs (1995–96)	20–22–4	15,746	W
47	January 24, 1996	5–6	St. Louis Blues (1995–96)	20–23–4	12,049	L
48	January 27, 1996	1–4	@ Montreal Canadiens (1995–96)	20–24–4	17,576	L
49	January 29, 1996	2–1	@ Dallas Stars (1995–96)	21–24–4	15,207	W

February: 5–6–0 (home: 4–3–0; road: 1–3–0)

Game	Date	Score	Opponent	Record	Attendance	Recap
50	February 1, 1996	4–6	@ Colorado Avalanche (1995–96)	21–25–4	16,061	L
51	February 4, 1996	2–4	Vancouver Canucks (1995–96)	21–26–4	10,472	L
52	February 8, 1996	6–2	Ottawa Senators (1995–96)	22–26–4	8,673	W
53	February 10, 1996	3–2	@ Calgary Flames (1995–96)	23–26–4	17,556	W
54	February 13, 1996	4–5	@ Vancouver Canucks (1995–96)	23–27–4	16,355	L
55	February 16, 1996	0–1	Pittsburgh Penguins (1995–96)	23–28–4	15,563	L
56	February 18, 1996	0–3	@ St. Louis Blues (1995–96)	23–29–4	20,017	L
57	February 21, 1996	3–5	Vancouver Canucks (1995–96)	23–30–4	8,592	L
58	February 23, 1996	1–0 OT	Chicago Blackhawks (1995–96)	24–30–4	13,741	W
59	February 26, 1996	4–3	Los Angeles Kings (1995–96)	25–30–4	13,107	W
60	February 28, 1996	4–3	Toronto Maple Leafs (1995–96)	26–30–4	13,518	W

March: 7–8–1 (home: 2–4–0; road: 5–4–1)

Game	Date	Score	Opponent	Record	Attendance	Recap
61	March 1, 1996	5–2	@ Hartford Whalers (1995–96)	27–30–4	11,552	W
62	March 3, 1996	7–5	@ New York Islanders (1995–96)	28–30–4	13,107	W
63	March 5, 1996	4–9	@ Pittsburgh Penguins (1995–96)	28–31–4	15,980	L
64	March 7, 1996	5–3	Florida Panthers (1995–96)	29–31–4	11,322	W
65	March 9, 1996	2–4	New York Islanders (1995–96)	29–32–4	12,647	L
66	March 10, 1996	2–5	Detroit Red Wings (1995–96)	29–33–4	14,757	L
67	March 12, 1996	2–5	@ Detroit Red Wings (1995–96)	29–34–4	19,983	L
68	March 13, 1996	3–3 OT	@ Toronto Maple Leafs (1995–96)	29–34–5	15,746	T
69	March 16, 1996	0–3	@ Philadelphia Flyers (1995–96)	29–35–5	17,380	L
70	March 20, 1996	1–7	San Jose Sharks (1995–96)	29–36–5	10,800	L
71	March 22, 1996	4–1	Philadelphia Flyers (1995–96)	30–36–5	15,565	W
72	March 24, 1996	2–5	Colorado Avalanche (1995–96)	30–37–5	15,518	L
73	March 26, 1996	8–2	@ Dallas Stars (1995–96)	31–37–5	16,184	W
74	March 27, 1996	3–1	@ Colorado Avalanche (1995–96)	32–37–5	16,061	W
75	March 29, 1996	2–3	@ Edmonton Oilers (1995–96)	32–38–5	16,437	L
76	March 31, 1996	4–1	@ Calgary Flames (1995–96)	33–38–5	18,155	W

April: 3–2–1 (home: 3–0–0; road: 0–2–1)

Game	Date	Score	Opponent	Record	Attendance	Recap
77	April 3, 1996	3–1	Dallas Stars (1995–96)	34–38–5	11,958	W
78	April 6, 1996	4–3	Calgary Flames (1995–96)	35–38–5	15,557	W
79	April 8, 1996	2–2 OT	@ St. Louis Blues (1995–96)	35–38–6	20,514	T
80	April 10, 1996	2–5	@ Detroit Red Wings (1995–96)	35–39–6	19,983	L
81	April 12, 1996	5–3	Los Angeles Kings (1995–96)	36–39–6	15,567	W
82	April 14, 1996	2–5	@ Mighty Ducks of Anaheim (1995–96)	36–40–6	17,174	L

Legend: W Win (2 points) L Loss (0 points) T Tie (1 point)

=== Playoffs ===
1996 Stanley Cup playoffs
Western Conference Quarterfinals vs. (1) Detroit Red Wings – Red Wings win 4–2

Game	Date	Score	Opponent	Attendance	Series	Recap
1	April 17, 1996	1–4	@ Detroit Red Wings	19,983	Red Wings lead 1–0	L
2	April 19, 1996	0–4	@ Detroit Red Wings	19,983	Red Wings lead 2–0	L
3	April 21, 1996	4–1	Detroit Red Wings	15,544	Red Wings lead 2–1	W
4	April 23, 1996	1–6	Detroit Red Wings	15,557	Red Wings lead 3–1	L
5	April 26, 1996	3–1	@ Detroit Red Wings	19,983	Red Wings lead 3–2	W
6	April 28, 1996	1–4	Detroit Red Wings	15,567	Red Wings win 4–2	L

Legend: W Win L Loss

== Player statistics ==
=== Scoring ===
- Position abbreviations: C = Centre; D = Defence; G = Goaltender; LW = Left wing; RW = Right wing
- † = Joined team via a transaction (e.g., trade, waivers, signing) during the season. Stats reflect time with the Jets only.
- ‡ = Left team via a transaction (e.g., trade, waivers, release) during the season. Stats reflect time with the Jets only.

No.	Player	Pos	Regular season						Playoffs					
No.	Player	Pos	GP	G	A	Pts	+/-	PIM	GP	G	A	Pts	+/-	PIM
7	Keith Tkachuk	LW	76	50	48	98	11	156	6	1	2	3	0	22
8	Teemu Selanne‡	RW	51	24	48	72	3	18	—	—	—	—	—	—
10	Alexei Zhamnov	C	58	22	37	59	−4	65	6	2	1	3	0	8
27	Teppo Numminen	D	74	11	43	54	−4	22	6	0	0	0	−3	2
23	Igor Korolev	C	73	22	29	51	1	42	6	0	3	3	−2	0
16	Ed Olczyk	C	51	27	22	49	0	65	6	1	2	3	0	6
11 (Note: Drake wore number 18 through February 13.)	Dallas Drake	RW	69	19	20	39	−7	36	3	0	0	0	−2	0
89	Darren Turcotte‡	C	59	16	16	32	−3	26	—	—	—	—	—	—
4	Dave Manson	D	82	7	23	30	8	205	6	2	1	3	3	30
44 (Note: Maciver wore number 2 in his first game.)	Norm Maciver†	D	39	5	25	30	−6	26	6	1	0	1	3	2
32	Mike Eastwood	C	80	14	14	28	−14	20	6	0	1	1	−1	2
14	Mike Stapleton	C	58	10	14	24	−4	37	6	0	0	0	−1	21
34	Darrin Shannon	LW	63	5	18	23	−5	28	6	1	0	1	0	6
17	Kris King	LW	81	9	11	20	−7	151	5	0	1	1	1	4
29	Craig Janney†	C	13	7	13	20	2	0	6	1	2	3	0	0
5	Deron Quint	D	51	5	13	18	−2	22	—	—	—	—	—	—
19 (Note: Doan wore number 21 in his first five games.)	Shane Doan	RW	74	7	10	17	−9	101	6	0	0	0	0	6
24	Darryl Shannon‡	D	48	2	7	9	5	72	—	—	—	—	—	—
20 (Note: Tverdovsky wore number 6 in his first eight games.)	Oleg Tverdovsky†	D	31	0	8	8	−7	6	6	0	1	1	−2	0
33	Jim McKenzie	LW	73	4	2	6	−4	202	1	0	0	0	0	2
26	Jeff Finley	D	65	1	5	6	−2	81	6	0	0	0	−4	4
15	Randy Gilhen	C	22	2	3	5	1	12	—	—	—	—	—	—
18 (Note: Kilger wore number 21 in his first three games.)	Chad Kilger†	LW	29	2	3	5	−2	12	4	1	0	1	0	0
2	Neil Wilkinson‡	D	21	1	4	5	0	33	—	—	—	—	—	—
28 (Note: Muni wore number 24 in his first five games.)	Craig Muni†	D	25	1	3	4	6	37	6	0	1	1	−2	2
55 (Note: Doig wore number 52 in his first ten games.)	Jason Doig	D	15	1	1	2	−2	28	—	—	—	—	—	—
39	Iain Fraser†	C	12	1	1	2	1	4	4	0	0	0	0	0
22	Craig Mills	RW	4	0	2	2	0	0	1	0	0	0	0	0
36	Stewart Malgunas‡	D	29	0	1	1	−10	32	—	—	—	—	—	—
3	Brent Thompson	D	10	0	1	1	−2	21	—	—	—	—	—	—
21	Denis Chasse†	RW	15	0	0	0	−4	12	—	—	—	—	—	—
29	Tim Cheveldae‡	G	30	0	0	0		0	—	—	—	—	—	—
37	Tom Draper†	G	1	0	0	0		0	—	—	—	—	—	—
6	Dallas Eakins†	D	2	0	0	0	1	0	—	—	—	—	—	—
75	Michal Grosek‡	LW	1	0	0	0	−1	0	—	—	—	—	—	—
43 (Note: Gusmanov wore number 50 in his first game.)	Ravil Gusmanov‡	LW	4	0	0	0	−3	0	—	—	—	—	—	—
35	Nikolai Khabibulin	G	53	0	0	0		12	6	0	0	0		0
31	Scott Langkow	G	1	0	0	0		0	—	—	—	—	—	—
12	Rob Murray	C	1	0	0	0	−1	2	—	—	—	—	—	—
30	Ed Ronan†	RW	17	0	0	0	−3	16	—	—	—	—	—	—
37	Dominic Roussel†	G	7	0	0	0		2	—	—	—	—	—	—

=== Goaltending ===
- † = Joined team via a transaction (e.g., trade, waivers, signing) during the season. Stats reflect time with the Jets only.
- ‡ = Left team via a transaction (e.g., trade, waivers, release) during the season. Stats reflect time with the Jets only.

No.	Player	Regular season										Playoffs								
No.	Player	GP	W	L	T	SA	GA	GAA	SV%	SO	TOI	GP	W	L	SA	GA	GAA	SV%	SO	TOI
35	Nikolai Khabibulin	53	26	20	3	1656	152	3.13	.908	2	2914	6	2	4	214	19	3.17	.911	0	359
29	Tim Cheveldae‡	30	8	18	3	948	111	3.93	.883	0	1695	—	—	—	—	—	—	—	—	—
37	Dominic Roussel†	7	2	2	0	134	16	3.37	.881	0	285	—	—	—	—	—	—	—	—	—
37	Tom Draper†	1	0	0	0	14	3	5.37	.786	0	34	—	—	—	—	—	—	—	—	—
31	Scott Langkow	1	0	0	0	2	0	0.00	1.000	0	6	—	—	—	—	—	—	—	—	—

== Awards and records ==
=== Awards ===
Type	Award/honour	Recipient	Ref
League (annual)	King Clancy Memorial Trophy	Kris King	
League (in-season)	NHL All-Star Game selection	Teemu Selanne	
Team	Molson Cup	Nikolai Khabibulin	

=== Milestones ===
Milestone	Player	Date	Ref
First game	Shane Doan	October 7, 1995	
First game	Jason Doig	October 7, 1995	
First game	Craig Mills	October 7, 1995	
First game	Deron Quint	October 7, 1995	
First game	Ravil Gusmanov	November 21, 1995	
First game	Scott Langkow	December 7, 1995	

== Transactions ==
=== Trades ===
September 20, 1995	To Philadelphia Flyers 7th round pick in 1997 (Andrew Merrick)	To Winnipeg Jets Andre Faust
October 6, 1995	To Hartford Whalers Nelson Emerson	To Winnipeg Jets Darren Turcotte
December 28, 1995	To Pittsburgh Penguins Neil Wilkinson	To Winnipeg Jets Norm Maciver
February 7, 1996	To Mighty Ducks of Anaheim Teemu Selanne; Marc Chouinard; 4th round pick in 1996 (Kim Staal)	To Winnipeg Jets Chad Kilger; Oleg Tverdovsky; 3rd round pick in 1996 (Per-Anton Lundstrom)
February 15, 1996	To Buffalo Sabres Michal Grosek; Darryl Shannon	To Winnipeg Jets Craig Muni; 1st round pick in 1996 (Daniel Briere)
February 15, 1996	To Washington Capitals Stewart Malgunas	To Winnipeg Jets Denis Chasse
February 27, 1996	To Philadelphia Flyers Tim Cheveldae; 3rd round pick in 1996 (Chester Gallant)	To Winnipeg Jets Dominic Roussel
March 18, 1996	To San Jose Sharks Darren Turcotte; 2nd round pick in 1996 (Remi Royer)	To Winnipeg Jets Craig Janney
March 20, 1996	To Chicago Blackhawks Ravil Gusmanov	To Winnipeg Jets 4th round pick in 1996 (Vladimir Antipov)

=== Waivers ===
October 1, 1995	From New York Islanders Jim McKenzie
March 20, 1996	From St. Louis Blues Dallas Eakins

=== Free agents ===
Player	Former team
Parris Duffus	Undrafted Free Agent
Jason Simon	New York Islanders
Stewart Malgunas	Philadelphia Flyers
Chris Govedaris	Detroit Red Wings
Mike Stapleton	Edmonton Oilers
Iain Fraser	Edmonton Oilers
Ed Ronan	Montreal Canadiens
Tom Draper	New York Islanders

Player	New team
Oleg Mikulchik	Mighty Ducks of Anaheim
Stephane Beauregard	San Francisco Spiders (IHL)

== Draft picks ==
Winnipeg's draft picks at the 1995 NHL entry draft held at the Edmonton Coliseum in Edmonton, Alberta.

Round	#	Player	Position	Nationality	College/Junior/Club team
1	7	Shane Doan	Centre	Canada	Kamloops Blazers (WHL)
2	32	Marc Chouinard	Centre	Canada	Beauport Harfangs (QMJHL)
2	34	Jason Doig	Defence	Canada	Laval Titan College Francais (QMJHL)
3	67	Brad Isbister	Defence	Canada	Portland Winter Hawks (WHL)
4	84	Justin Kurtz	Defence	Canada	Brandon Wheat Kings (WHL)
5	121	Brian Elder	Goaltender	Canada	Brandon Wheat Kings (WHL)
6	137	Sylvain Daigle	Goaltender	Canada	Shawinigan Cataractes (QMJHL)
7	162	Paul Traynor	Defence	Canada	Kitchener Rangers (OHL)
8	188	Jaroslav Obsut	Right wing	Slovakia	Battlefords North Stars (SJHL)
8	189	Fredrik Loven	Defence	Sweden	Djurgardens IF (SEL)
9	214	Rob DeCiantis	Centre	Canada	Kitchener Rangers (OHL)

== Relocation to Phoenix ==
As the National Hockey League (NHL) expanded into the United States, the team operating costs and salaries grew rapidly; this development put a high strain on the League's Canadian teams. As Winnipeg was the League's second-smallest market (eventually becoming the smallest market after the Quebec Nordiques moved to Denver, Colorado, in 1995), the Jets were unable to retain their best players. Various schemes were devised to save the team through a tremendous grassroots effort and government funds, but in the end, the efforts were not enough.

Despite strong fan support, the Winnipeg Jets were at a financial disadvantage with many American franchises. The team was sold to Phoenix businessmen Steven Gluckstern and Richard Burke, and in 1996, the club moved to Arizona and became the Phoenix Coyotes. In the summer that the move took place, the franchise saw the exit of Jets stars like Teemu Selanne and Alexei Zhamnov, while the team added established superstar Jeremy Roenick from the Chicago Blackhawks. Roenick teamed up with power wingers Keith Tkachuk and Rick Tocchet to form a dynamic 1–2–3 offensive punch that led the Coyotes through their first years in Arizona. Also impressive were young players Shane Doan (who was the last remaining original Jet active in the NHL), Oleg Tverdovsky and goaltender Nikolai Khabibulin, whom the fans nicknamed the "Bulin Wall."
