= 1995–96 Pittsburgh Penguins season =

NHL team season

1995–96 Pittsburgh Penguins
- Northeast Division champions
- Division: 1st Northeast
- Conference: 2nd Eastern
- 1995–96 record: 49–29–4
- Home record: 32–9–0
- Road record: 17–20–4
- Goals for: 362
- Goals against: 284

Team information
- General manager: Craig Patrick
- Coach: Eddie Johnston
- Captain: Mario Lemieux
- Alternate captains: Ron Francis; Jaromir Jagr
- Arena: Pittsburgh Civic Arena
- Average attendance: 16,238
- Minor league affiliates: Cleveland Lumberjacks; Hampton Roads Admirals

Team leaders
- Goals: Mario Lemieux (69)
- Assists: Mario Lemieux (92)
- Points: Mario Lemieux (161)
- Penalty minutes: Francois Leroux (161)
- Plus/minus: Petr Nedved (+37)
- Wins: Tom Barrasso (29)
- Goals against average: Ken Wregget (3.24)

The 1995–96 Pittsburgh Penguins season saw the return of Mario Lemieux after missing an entire season due to injuries. The Penguins improved to first in the Northeast Division and second overall in the Eastern Conference. In the 1996 Stanley Cup playoffs, the Penguins progressed to the Conference Finals before losing to the Florida Panthers.

== Regular season ==
Mario Lemieux's return to the NHL after missing the entire 1994–95 season energized the Penguins and re-instituted the team's finesse game for the 1995–96 season. The Penguins finished second in the Eastern Conference with 102 points, leading all League teams in goals (362), even-strength goals (235), power-play goals (109), power-play percentage (25.95%) and shooting percentage while scoring 362 goals on just 2,645 shots (13.7%). Despite missing 12 regular-season games, Lemieux led the NHL in goals (69), assists (92), points (161) power-play goals (31) and shorthanded goals (8). Czech superstar Jaromir Jagr had a career year, scoring 62 goals (second in the League), 87 assists (third in the League) and 149 points (second in the League). The third 100-point scorer on the team was Ron Francis, who tallied 27 goals and 92 assists (tied for first in the NHL with Lemieux) for 119 points. Petr Nedved scored 45 goals and had 54 assists for 99 points in 80 games—he finished second in the NHL in shooting percentage, with 22.1%. Despite missing over a quarter of the season, Tomas Sandstrom also had a strong year, scoring 35 goals and picking up 35 assists for 70 points in 58 games.

Lemieux scored three goals or more in a game six times, and four goals or more in a game twice. On March 26, 1996, he scored five goals in a home game against the St. Louis Blues. Lemieux tallied two even-strength goals, two power-play goals and one short-handed goal in the game, which the Penguins won 8–4.

=== Season standings ===
Northeast Division
No.		GP	W	L	T	GF	GA	PTS
1	**Pittsburgh Penguins**	82	49	29	4	362	284	102
2	**Boston Bruins**	82	40	31	11	282	269	91
3	**Montreal Canadiens**	82	40	32	10	265	248	90
4	Hartford Whalers	82	34	39	9	237	259	77
5	Buffalo Sabres	82	33	42	7	247	262	72
6	Ottawa Senators	82	18	59	5	191	291	41

Eastern Conference
R		Div	GP	W	L	T	GF	GA	Pts
**1**	**Philadelphia Flyers**	**ATL**	**82**	**45**	**24**	**13**	**282**	**208**	**103**
**2**	**Pittsburgh Penguins**	**NE**	**82**	**49**	**29**	**4**	**362**	**284**	**102**
**3**	**New York Rangers**	**ATL**	**82**	**41**	**27**	**14**	**272**	**237**	**96**
**4**	**Florida Panthers**	**ATL**	**82**	**41**	**31**	**10**	**254**	**234**	**92**
**5**	**Boston Bruins**	**NE**	**82**	**40**	**31**	**11**	**282**	**269**	**91**
**6**	**Montreal Canadiens**	**NE**	**82**	**40**	**32**	**10**	**265**	**248**	**90**
**7**	**Washington Capitals**	**ATL**	**82**	**39**	**32**	**11**	**234**	**204**	**89**
**8**	**Tampa Bay Lightning**	**ATL**	**82**	**38**	**32**	**12**	**238**	**248**	**88**
9	New Jersey Devils	ATL	82	37	33	12	215	202	86
10	Hartford Whalers	NE	82	34	39	9	237	259	77
11	Buffalo Sabres	NE	82	33	42	7	247	262	73
12	New York Islanders	ATL	82	22	50	10	229	315	54
13	Ottawa Senators	NE	82	18	59	5	191	291	41

Divisions: ATL – Atlantic, NE – Northeast

bold – Qualified for playoffs

== Playoffs ==
In the 1996 Playoffs, the Penguins advanced to the third round for the first time since 1992, defeating the Washington Capitals in six games and the New York Rangers in five games. In the Eastern Conference finals, the heavily favored Penguins were upset in seven games by the defense-oriented Florida Panthers.

== Schedule and results ==
=== Regular season ===
1995–96 regular season
October: 4–2–2 (home: 2–1–0; road: 2–1–2), 10 points

#	Date	Visitor	Score	Home	Record	Points	Recap
1	Oct 7	Toronto Maple Leafs	3–8	Pittsburgh Penguins	1–0–0	2	W
2	Oct 9	Pittsburgh Penguins	6–6 OT	Colorado Avalanche	1–0–1	3	T
3	Oct 12	Pittsburgh Penguins	1–5	Chicago Blackhawks	1–1–1	3	L
4	Oct 14	Mighty Ducks of Anaheim	2–5	Pittsburgh Penguins	2–1–1	5	W
5	Oct 20	Pittsburgh Penguins	2–2 OT	Hartford Whalers	2–1–2	6	T
6	Oct 21	Los Angeles Kings	3–2 OT	Pittsburgh Penguins	2–2–2	6	L
7	Oct 26	Pittsburgh Penguins	7–5	New York Islanders	3–2–2	8	W
8	Oct 28	Pittsburgh Penguins	5–3	New Jersey Devils	4–2–2	10	W

November: 10–3–1 (home: 6–1–0; road: 4–2–1), 21 points

#	Date	Visitor	Score	Home	Record	Points	Recap
9	Nov 1	Tampa Bay Lightning	0–10	Pittsburgh Penguins	5–2–2	12	W
10	Nov 3	Pittsburgh Penguins	3–3 OT	Buffalo Sabres	5–2–3	13	T
11	Nov 4	Philadelphia Flyers	4–7	Pittsburgh Penguins	6–2–3	15	W
12	Nov 8	Pittsburgh Penguins	7–1	Ottawa Senators	7–2–3	17	W
13	Nov 10	Pittsburgh Penguins	9–1	San Jose Sharks	8–2–3	19	W
14	Nov 11	Pittsburgh Penguins	2–3	Los Angeles Kings	8–3–3	19	L
15	Nov 14	Dallas Stars	2–4	Pittsburgh Penguins	9–3–3	21	W
16	Nov 17	Pittsburgh Penguins	3–2 OT	Washington Capitals	10–3–3	23	W
17	Nov 18	Washington Capitals	0–3	Pittsburgh Penguins	11–3–3	25	W
18	Nov 21	Pittsburgh Penguins	4–9	New York Rangers	11–4–3	25	L
19	Nov 22	New York Rangers	4–3	Pittsburgh Penguins	11–5–3	25	L
20	Nov 25	Buffalo Sabres	3–5	Pittsburgh Penguins	12–5–3	27	W
21	Nov 28	Ottawa Senators	2–7	Pittsburgh Penguins	13–5–3	29	W
22	Nov 30	Pittsburgh Penguins	9–6	Boston Bruins	14–5–3	31	W

December: 10–4–0 (home: 7–1–0; road: 3–3–0), 20 points

#	Date	Visitor	Score	Home	Record	Points	Recap
23	Dec 1	Florida Panthers	1–2	Pittsburgh Penguins	15–5–3	33	W
24	Dec 3	Pittsburgh Penguins	5–4	Tampa Bay Lightning	16–5–3	35	W
25	Dec 5	Pittsburgh Penguins	6–3	New York Islanders	17–5–3	37	W
26	Dec 7	Montreal Canadiens	5–7	Pittsburgh Penguins	18–5–3	39	W
27	Dec 9	Hartford Whalers	0–6	Pittsburgh Penguins	19–5–3	41	W
28	Dec 13	Pittsburgh Penguins	3–6	Mighty Ducks of Anaheim	19–6–3	41	L
29	Dec 15	Pittsburgh Penguins	5–1	Dallas Stars	20–6–3	43	W
30	Dec 17	Pittsburgh Penguins	5–6	Philadelphia Flyers	20–7–3	43	L
31	Dec 19	Calgary Flames	1–7	Pittsburgh Penguins	21–7–3	45	W
32	Dec 22	Montreal Canadiens	4–2	Pittsburgh Penguins	21–8–3	45	L
33	Dec 23	Pittsburgh Penguins	0–1	Montreal Canadiens	21–9–3	45	L
34	Dec 26	Buffalo Sabres	3–6	Pittsburgh Penguins	22–9–3	47	W
35	Dec 28	Hartford Whalers	4–9	Pittsburgh Penguins	23–9–3	49	W
36	Dec 30	Florida Panthers	5–6	Pittsburgh Penguins	24–9–3	51	W

January: 7–7–0 (home: 5–3–0; road: 2–4–0), 14 points

#	Date	Visitor	Score	Home	Record	Points	Recap
37	Jan 1	Pittsburgh Penguins	2–4	Washington Capitals	24–10–3	51	L
38	Jan 3	Ottawa Senators	1–4	Pittsburgh Penguins	25–10–3	53	W
39	Jan 5	Detroit Red Wings	2–5	Pittsburgh Penguins	26–10–3	55	W
40	Jan 6	Pittsburgh Penguins	2–3	St. Louis Blues	26–11–3	55	L
41	Jan 8	Vancouver Canucks	5–8	Pittsburgh Penguins	27–11–3	57	W
42	Jan 12	Montreal Canadiens	6–5	Pittsburgh Penguins	27–12–3	57	L
43	Jan 13	San Jose Sharks	10–8	Pittsburgh Penguins	27–13–3	57	L
44	Jan 16	Colorado Avalanche	5–2	Pittsburgh Penguins	27–14–3	57	L
45	Jan 17	Pittsburgh Penguins	1–0	Buffalo Sabres	28–14–3	59	W
46	Jan 22	Boston Bruins	6–7 OT	Pittsburgh Penguins	29–14–3	61	W
47	Jan 24	Pittsburgh Penguins	4–3	Ottawa Senators	30–14–3	63	W
48	Jan 27	Philadelphia Flyers	4–7	Pittsburgh Penguins	31–14–3	65	W
49	Jan 29	Pittsburgh Penguins	1–2	Florida Panthers	31–15–3	65	L
50	Jan 31	Pittsburgh Penguins	1–4	Tampa Bay Lightning	31–16–3	65	L

February: 6–5–1 (home: 4–0–0; road: 2–5–1), 13 points

#	Date	Visitor	Score	Home	Record	Points	Recap
51	Feb 3	Pittsburgh Penguins	0–3	Detroit Red Wings	31–17–3	65	L
52	Feb 6	Boston Bruins	5–6	Pittsburgh Penguins	32–17–3	67	W
53	Feb 7	Pittsburgh Penguins	1–1 OT	New Jersey Devils	32–17–4	68	T
54	Feb 10	Chicago Blackhawks	3–6	Pittsburgh Penguins	33–17–4	70	W
55	Feb 12	Pittsburgh Penguins	1–4	Toronto Maple Leafs	33–18–4	70	L
56	Feb 16	Pittsburgh Penguins	1–0	Winnipeg Jets	34–18–4	72	W
57	Feb 18	New York Rangers	3–4 OT	Pittsburgh Penguins	35–18–4	74	W
58	Feb 21	Pittsburgh Penguins	3–6	Buffalo Sabres	35–19–4	74	L
59	Feb 23	Hartford Whalers	4–5	Pittsburgh Penguins	36–19–4	76	W
60	Feb 24	Pittsburgh Penguins	3–7	Montreal Canadiens	36–20–4	76	L
61	Feb 27	Pittsburgh Penguins	7–4	Vancouver Canucks	37–20–4	78	W
62	Feb 29	Pittsburgh Penguins	3–7	Calgary Flames	37–21–4	78	L

March: 9–5–0 (home: 6–2–0; road: 3–3–0), 18 points

#	Date	Visitor	Score	Home	Record	Points	Recap
63	Mar 1	Pittsburgh Penguins	5–4	Edmonton Oilers	38–21–4	80	W
64	Mar 5	Winnipeg Jets	4–9	Pittsburgh Penguins	39–21–4	82	W
65	Mar 7	Ottawa Senators	1–5	Pittsburgh Penguins	40–21–4	84	W
66	Mar 9	New Jersey Devils	4–3 OT	Pittsburgh Penguins	40–22–4	84	L
67	Mar 13	Pittsburgh Penguins	2–3	Hartford Whalers	40–23–4	84	L
68	Mar 14	Pittsburgh Penguins	2–4	Boston Bruins	40–24–4	84	L
69	Mar 16	New York Islanders	2–4	Pittsburgh Penguins	41–24–4	86	W
70	Mar 21	Edmonton Oilers	4–5	Pittsburgh Penguins	42–24–4	88	W
71	Mar 23	Buffalo Sabres	7–5	Pittsburgh Penguins	42–25–4	88	L
72	Mar 24	Pittsburgh Penguins	8–2	New York Rangers	43–25–4	90	W
73	Mar 26	St. Louis Blues	4–8	Pittsburgh Penguins	44–25–4	92	W
74	Mar 28	Pittsburgh Penguins	3–2	Florida Panthers	45–25–4	94	W
75	Mar 30	New Jersey Devils	1–2	Pittsburgh Penguins	46–25–4	96	W
76	Mar 31	Pittsburgh Penguins	1–4	Philadelphia Flyers	46–26–4	96	L

April: 3–3–0 (home: 2–1–0; road: 1–2–0), 6 points

#	Date	Visitor	Score	Home	Record	Points	Recap
77	Apr 4	Washington Capitals	2–4	Pittsburgh Penguins	47–26–4	98	W
78	Apr 6	Tampa Bay Lightning	1–2	Pittsburgh Penguins	48–26–4	100	W
79	Apr 8	Pittsburgh Penguins	4–5	Hartford Whalers	48–27–4	100	L
80	Apr 10	New York Islanders	6–2	Pittsburgh Penguins	48–28–4	100	L
81	Apr 11	Pittsburgh Penguins	5–3	Ottawa Senators	49–28–4	102	W
82	Apr 14	Pittsburgh Penguins	5–6	Boston Bruins	49–29–4	102	L

Legend: W Win (2 points) L Loss (0 points) T Tie (1 point)

=== Playoffs ===
1996 Stanley Cup playoffs
Eastern Conference Quarterfinals vs. (7) Washington Capitals – Penguins win 4–2

Game	Date	Visitor	Score	Home	Attendance	Series	Recap
1	Apr 17	Washington Capitals	6–4	Pittsburgh Penguins	16,238	0–1	L
2	Apr 19	Washington Capitals	5–3	Pittsburgh Penguins	17,181	0–2	L
3	Apr 22	Pittsburgh Penguins	4–1	Washington Capitals	18,130	1–2	W
4	Apr 24	Pittsburgh Penguins	3–2 4OT	Washington Capitals	18,130	2–2	W
5	Apr 26	Washington Capitals	1–4	Pittsburgh Penguins	17,215	3–2	W
6	Apr 28	Pittsburgh Penguins	3–2	Washington Capitals	17,256	4–2	W

Eastern Conference Semifinals vs. (3) New York Rangers – Penguins win 4–1

Game	Date	Visitor	Score	Home	Attendance	Series	Recap
1	May 3	New York Rangers	3–4	Pittsburgh Penguins	17,181	1–0	W
2	May 5	New York Rangers	6–3	Pittsburgh Penguins	17,181	0–1	L
3	May 7	Pittsburgh Penguins	3–2	New York Rangers	18,200	2–1	W
4	May 9	Pittsburgh Penguins	4–1	New York Rangers	18,200	3–1	W
5	May 11	New York Rangers	3–7	Pittsburgh Penguins	17,355	4–1	W

Eastern Conference Finals vs. (4) Florida Panthers – Panthers win 4–3

Game	Date	Visitor	Score	Home	Attendance	Series	Recap
1	May 18	Florida Panthers	5–1	Pittsburgh Penguins	17,355	0–1	L
2	May 20	Florida Panthers	2–3	Pittsburgh Penguins	17,181	1–1	W
3	May 24	Pittsburgh Penguins	2–5	Florida Panthers	14,703	1–2	L
4	May 26	Pittsburgh Penguins	2–1	Florida Panthers	14,703	2–2	W
5	May 28	Florida Panthers	0–3	Pittsburgh Penguins	17,355	3–2	W
6	May 30	Pittsburgh Penguins	3–4	Florida Panthers	14,703	3–3	L
7	Jun 1	Florida Panthers	3–1	Pittsburgh Penguins	17,355	3–4	L

Legend: W Win L Loss

== Suspensions ==
Player	Length	Date	Reason
Ron Francis	2 games	February 27, 1996	Checking from behind

== Injuries ==
Player	Injury	Date
Tom Barrasso	Pulled Groin (DTD)	December 7, 1995
Tom Barrasso	Shoulder injury (Out Indefinitely)	February 5, 1996
Stefan Bergkvist	Appendectomy	February 21, 1996

== Player statistics ==
Skaters

Regular season
Player	GP	G	A	Pts	+/−	PIM
Mario Lemieux	70	69	92	161	10	54
Jaromir Jagr	82	62	87	149	31	96
Ron Francis	77	27	92	119	25	56
Petr Nedved	80	45	54	99	37	68
Tomas Sandstrom	58	35	35	70	4	69
Sergei Zubov	64	11	55	66	28	22
Bryan Smolinski	81	24	40	64	6	69
Markus Naslund^{‡}	66	19	33	52	17	36
Dmitri Mironov	72	3	31	34	19	88
Glen Murray	69	14	15	29	4	57
Norm MacIver^{‡}	32	2	21	23	12	32
Chris Joseph	70	5	14	19	6	71
Dave Roche	71	7	7	14	–5	130
Chris Tamer	70	4	10	14	20	153
Neil Wilkinson^{†}	41	2	10	12	12	87
Francois Leroux	66	2	9	11	2	161
Kevin Miller^{†}	13	6	5	11	4	4
Richard Park	56	4	6	10	3	36
Joe Dziedzic	69	5	5	10	–5	68
Jean-Jacques Daigneault^{†}	13	3	3	6	0	23
Dave McLlwain^{†}	18	2	4	6	–5	4
Brad Lauer	21	4	1	5	–5	6
Corey Foster	11	2	2	4	–2	2
Chris Wells	54	2	2	4	–6	59
Rusty Fitzgerald	21	1	2	3	7	12
Ed Patterson	35	0	2	2	–5	38
Ian Moran	51	1	1	2	–1	47
Alek Stojanov^{†}	10	1	0	1	–1	7
Drake Berehowsky	1	0	0	0	1	0
Stefan Bergqvist	2	0	0	0	0	2
Peter Allen	8	0	0	0	2	8
Len Barrie	5	0	0	0	–1	18
Jeff Christian	3	0	0	0	0	2
Greg Andrusak	2	0	0	0	–1	0
Total		362	638	1000	—	1,585

Playoffs
Player	GP	G	A	Pts	+/−	PIM
Mario Lemieux	18	11	16	27	3	33
Jaromir Jagr	18	11	12	23	7	18
Petr Nedved	18	10	10	20	3	16
Sergei Zubov	18	1	14	15	9	26
Jean-Jacques Daigneault	17	1	9	10	4	36
Ron Francis	11	3	6	9	3	4
Dave Roche	16	2	7	9	1	26
Bryan Smolinski	18	5	4	9	–4	10
Glen Murray	18	2	6	8	2	10
Chris Tamer	18	0	7	7	0	24
Tomas Sandstrom	18	4	2	6	–6	30
Kevin Miller	18	3	2	5	–6	8
Joe Dziedzic	16	1	2	3	1	19
Francois Leroux	18	1	1	2	2	20
Brad Lauer	12	1	1	2	0	4
Chris Joseph	15	1	0	1	1	8
Neil Wilkinson	15	0	1	1	–2	14
Dmitri Mironov	15	0	1	1	–6	10
Corey Foster	3	0	0	0	–2	4
Richard Park	1	0	0	0	0	0
Dave McLlwain	6	0	0	0	0	0
Alek Stojanov	9	0	0	0	0	19
Stefan Bergqvist	4	0	0	0	–1	2
Total		57	101	158	—	341

Goaltenders

Regular Season
Player	GP	TOI	W	L	T	GA	GAA	SA	SV%	SO	G	A	PIM
Tom Barrasso	49	2799:01	29	16	2	160	3.43	1626	0.902	2	0	3	18
Ken Wregget	37	2132:15	20	13	2	115	3.24	1205	0.905	3	0	2	8
Total		4931:16	49	29	4	275	3.35	2831	0.903	5	0	5	26

Playoffs
Player	GP	TOI	W	L	T	GA	GAA	SA	SV%	SO	G	A	PIM
Ken Wregget	9	598:47	7	2	0	23	2.30	328	0.93	0	0	1	0
Tom Barrasso	10	557:30	4	5	0	26	2.80	337	0.923	1	0	0	8
Total		1156:17	11	7	0	49	2.54	665	0.926	1	0	1	8

^{†}Denotes player spent time with another team before joining the Penguins. Stats reflect time with the Penguins only.
^{‡}Denotes player was traded mid-season. Stats reflect time with the Penguins only.

== Awards and records ==
- Mario Lemieux became the first person to score 500 goals for the Penguins. He did so with a hat-trick in a 7–5 win over New York on October 3.
- Mario Lemieux became the first person to score 800 assists for the Penguins. He did so in a 8–4 win over St. Louis on March 26.
- Mario Lemieux became the first person to score 1300 points for the Penguins. He did so in a 5–2 win over Detroit on January 5.
- Jaromir Jagr set a new league record for most assists in a season by a winger (87). He broke the previous record of 83 set by Mike Bossy in 1982.
- Jaromir Jagr set a new league record for most points in a season by a winger (149). He broke the previous record of 147 set by Mike Bossy in 1982.
- Jaromir Jagr set a new league record for most points by a player born outside of North America (149). He broke the previous record of 139 set by Peter Stastny in 1982.

=== Awards ===
Type	Award/honor	Recipient	Ref
League (annual)	Art Ross Trophy	Mario Lemieux	
League (annual)	Hart Memorial Trophy	Mario Lemieux	
League (annual)	Lester B. Pearson Award	Mario Lemieux	
League (annual)	NHL First All-Star team	Jaromir Jagr (Right wing)	
League (annual)	NHL First All-Star team	Mario Lemieux (Center)	
League (in-season)	NHL All-Star Game selection	Ron Francis	
League (in-season)	NHL All-Star Game selection	Jaromir Jagr (Note: Jagr and Lemieux were voted to the starting lineup.)	
League (in-season)	NHL All-Star Game selection	Eddie Johnston (coach)	
League (in-season)	NHL All-Star Game selection	Mario Lemieux	
Team	A. T. Caggiano Memorial Booster Club Award	Mario Lemieux	
Team	Aldege "Baz" Bastien Memorial Good Guy Award	Petr Nedved	
Team	Bob Johnson Memorial Badger Bob Award	Jaromir Jagr	
Team	Leading Scorer Award	Mario Lemieux	
Team	Michel Briere Memorial Rookie of the Year Trophy	No winner	
Team	Most Valuable Player Award	Mario Lemieux	
Team	Players' Player Award	Ron Francis	
Team	The Edward J. DeBartolo Community Service Award	Dave Roche	

=== Milestones ===
Milestone	Player	Date	Ref
First game	Joe Dziedzic	October 7, 1995	
First game	Dave Roche	October 7, 1995	
First game	Chris Wells	October 21, 1995	
First game	Peter Allen	November 25, 1995	
First game	Stefan Bergqvist	February 16, 1996	

== Transactions ==
The Penguins have been involved in the following transactions during the 1995–96 season:

=== Trades ===
July 8, 1995	To Toronto Maple Leafs Larry Murphy	To Pittsburgh Penguins Dmitri Mironov; 1996 2nd round pick
August 1, 1995	To Boston Bruins Kevin Stevens; Shawn McEachern	To Pittsburgh Penguins Glen Murray; Bryan Smolinski; 1996 3rd round pick
August 31, 1995	To New York Rangers Luc Robitaille; Ulf Samuelsson	To Pittsburgh Penguins Petr Nedved; Sergei Zubov
December 28, 1995	To Winnipeg Jets Norm MacIver	To Pittsburgh Penguins Neil Wilkinson
March 1, 1996	To Ottawa Senators 1996 8th round pick	To Pittsburgh Penguins Dave McLlwain
March 20, 1996	To Vancouver Canucks Markus Naslund	To Pittsburgh Penguins Alek Stojanov
March 20, 1996	To St. Louis Blues 1996 6th round pick	To Pittsburgh Penguins Jean-Jacques Daigneault
March 20, 1996	To San Jose Sharks 1996 5th round pick	To Pittsburgh Penguins Kevin Miller

=== Free agents ===
Player	Acquired from	Lost to	Date
Troy Murray		Colorado Avalanche	August 7, 1995
Corey Foster	Ottawa Senators		August 7, 1995
Peter Taglianetti		Boston Bruins	August 9, 1995
Peter Allen	Boston Bruins		August 10, 1995
Mike Hudson		Toronto Maple Leafs	August 28, 1995
Joe Mullen		Boston Bruins	September 8, 1995
John Cullen		Tampa Bay Lightning	September 11, 1995
Ladislav Karabin		Buffalo Sabres	September 20, 1995

=== Signings ===
Player	Date
Brad Lauer	August 10, 1995
Evgeny Davydov	August 10, 1995
Troy Crowder	August 10, 1995
Glen Murray	September 8, 1995

=== Other ===
Name	Date	Details
Evgeny Davydov	September 25, 1995	Released
Perry Ganchar	October 15, 1995	Retired

== Draft picks ==
Pittsburgh Penguins' picks at the 1995 NHL entry draft.

Round	#	Player	Pos	Nationality	College/Junior/Club team (League)
1	24	Aleksey Morozov	Right wing	Russia	Krylja Sovetov (Russia)
3	76	Jean-Sebastien Aubin	Goaltender	Canada	Sherbrooke Faucons (QMJHL)
4	102	Oleg Belov	Center	Russia	CSKA Moscow (Russia)
5	128	Jan Hrdina	Center	Czech Republic	Seattle Thunderbirds (WHL)
6	154	Alexei Kolkunov	Center	Russia	Krylja Sovetov (Russia)
7	180	Derrick Pyke	Right wing	Canada	Halifax Mooseheads (QMJHL)
8	206	Sergei Voronov	Defense	Russia	Moscow Dynamo (Russia)
9	232	Frank Ivankovic	Goaltender	Canada	Oshawa Generals (OHL)

Draft notes

- The Pittsburgh Penguins' second-round pick went to the Los Angeles Kings as the result of a July 29, 1994, trade that sent Luc Robitaille to the Penguins in exchange for Rick Tocchet and this pick.

== Farm teams ==
The Hampton Roads Admirals of the East Coast Hockey League finished in fifth place in the East Division, but lost in the first round of the playoffs to the Richmond Renegades.

The Cleveland Lumberjacks of the International Hockey League (IHL) finished in third place in the Central Division, but were swept in the first round of the playoffs by the Michigan K-Wings.
