= 1995–96 Toronto Maple Leafs season =

NHL hockey team season

1995–96 Toronto Maple Leafs
- Division: 3rd Central
- Conference: 4th Western
- 1995–96 record: 34–36–12
- Home record: 19–15–7
- Road record: 15–21–5
- Goals for: 247
- Goals against: 252

Team information
- General manager: Cliff Fletcher
- Coach: Pat Burns (Oct.–Mar.); Nick Beverley (Mar.–Apr.)
- Captain: Doug Gilmour
- Arena: Maple Leaf Gardens
- Average attendance: 15,729
- Minor league affiliate: St. John's Maple Leafs

Team leaders
- Goals: Mike Gartner (35)
- Assists: Mats Sundin (50)
- Points: Mats Sundin (83)
- Penalty minutes: Tie Domi (297)
- Plus/minus: Kenny Jonsson (+12)
- Wins: Felix Potvin (30)
- Goals against average: Damian Rhodes (2.79)

The 1995–96 Toronto Maple Leafs season was Toronto's 79th season in the National Hockey League (NHL). The team would qualify for the playoffs for the fourth consecutive year, losing in the quarterfinals to the St. Louis Blues.

== Regular season ==
The Leafs headed into the 1995–96 regular season with high hopes considering the fact the club reached the playoffs for the last three years. Pat Burns was the head coach until an eight-game losing streak (and a miserable run of 3–16–3 over January and February) led to his termination. General manager Cliff Fletcher felt that Nick Beverley could get the job done for the rest of the season and named him interim coach. The team under Beverley went an impressive 9–6–2 and clinched a playoff spot on the final day of their regular season.

- December 11, 1995: Patrick Roy earned his first victory in net as a member of the Colorado Avalanche. It was a 5–1 victory over the Toronto Maple Leafs.
- December 30, 1995: Mats Sundin scored just 6 seconds into the overtime period to give the Maple Leafs a 4–3 road win over the St. Louis Blues. It would prove to be the fastest regular-season overtime goal ever scored and has been matched twice since.

=== Season standings ===
Central Division
| No. | | GP | W | L | T | GF | GA | Pts |
|---|---|---|---|---|---|---|---|---|
| 1 | **Detroit Red Wings** | 82 | 62 | 13 | 7 | 325 | 181 | 131 |
| 2 | **Chicago Blackhawks** | 82 | 40 | 28 | 14 | 273 | 220 | 94 |
| 3 | **Toronto Maple Leafs** | 82 | 34 | 36 | 12 | 247 | 252 | 80 |
| 4 | **St. Louis Blues** | 82 | 32 | 34 | 16 | 219 | 248 | 80 |
| 5 | **Winnipeg Jets** | 82 | 36 | 40 | 6 | 275 | 291 | 78 |
| 6 | Dallas Stars | 82 | 26 | 42 | 14 | 227 | 280 | 66 |

Note: GP = Games played; W = Wins; L = Losses; T = Ties; GF = Goals for; GA = Goals against; Pts = Points
Bolded teams qualified for the playoffs.

Western Conference
| R | | Div | GP | W | L | T | GF | GA | Pts |
|---|---|---|---|---|---|---|---|---|---|
| **1** | **p – Detroit Red Wings** | **CEN** | **82** | **62** | **13** | **7** | **325** | **181** | **131** |
| **2** | **Colorado Avalanche** | **PAC** | **82** | **47** | **25** | **10** | **326** | **240** | **104** |
| **3** | **Chicago Blackhawks** | **CEN** | **82** | **40** | **28** | **14** | **273** | **220** | **94** |
| **4** | **Toronto Maple Leafs** | **CEN** | **82** | **34** | **36** | **12** | **247** | **252** | **80** |
| **5** | **St. Louis Blues** | **CEN** | **82** | **32** | **34** | **16** | **219** | **248** | **80** |
| **6** | **Calgary Flames** | **PAC** | **82** | **34** | **37** | **11** | **241** | **240** | **79** |
| **7** | **Vancouver Canucks** | **PAC** | **82** | **32** | **35** | **15** | **278** | **278** | **79** |
| **8** | **Winnipeg Jets** | **CEN** | **82** | **36** | **40** | **6** | **275** | **291** | **78** |
| 9 | Mighty Ducks of Anaheim | PAC | 82 | 35 | 39 | 8 | 234 | 247 | 78 |
| 10 | Edmonton Oilers | PAC | 82 | 30 | 44 | 8 | 240 | 304 | 68 |
| 11 | Dallas Stars | CEN | 82 | 26 | 42 | 14 | 227 | 280 | 66 |
| 12 | Los Angeles Kings | PAC | 82 | 24 | 40 | 18 | 256 | 302 | 66 |
| 13 | San Jose Sharks | PAC | 82 | 20 | 55 | 7 | 252 | 357 | 47 |

Divisions: CEN – Central, PAC – Pacific

bold – Qualified for playoffs; p – Won Presidents' Trophy

== Schedule and results ==
=== Regular season ===
1995–96 regular season
October: 4–5–1 (home: 3–2–1; road: 1–3–0)

| Game | Date | Score | Opponent | Record | Recap |
|---|---|---|---|---|---|
| 1 | October 7, 1995 | 3–8 | @ Pittsburgh Penguins (1995–96) | 0–1–0 | L |
| 2 | October 10, 1995 | 7–3 | New York Islanders (1995–96) | 1–1–0 | W |
| 3 | October 14, 1995 | 0–2 | New York Rangers (1995–96) | 1–2–0 | L |
| 4 | October 17, 1995 | 7–2 | San Jose Sharks (1995–96) | 2–2–0 | W |
| 5 | October 20, 1995 | 4–3 OT | Calgary Flames (1995–96) | 3–2–0 | W |
| 6 | October 21, 1995 | 3–4 | @ Montreal Canadiens (1995–96) | 3–3–0 | L |
| 7 | October 24, 1995 | 1–6 | Florida Panthers (1995–96) | 3–4–0 | L |
| 8 | October 26, 1995 | 2–1 | @ Chicago Blackhawks (1995–96) | 4–4–0 | W |
| 9 | October 28, 1995 | 2–2 OT | Los Angeles Kings (1995–96) | 4–4–1 | T |
| 10 | October 29, 1995 | 2–3 | @ New York Rangers (1995–96) | 4–5–1 | L |

November: 7–4–3 (home: 4–1–0; road: 3–3–3)

| Game | Date | Score | Opponent | Record | Recap |
|---|---|---|---|---|---|
| 11 | November 1, 1995 | 4–2 | @ Winnipeg Jets (1995–96) | 5–5–1 | W |
| 12 | November 3, 1995 | 4–4 OT | @ Vancouver Canucks (1995–96) | 5–5–2 | T |
| 13 | November 4, 1995 | 3–3 OT | @ Edmonton Oilers (1995–96) | 5–5–3 | T |
| 14 | November 7, 1995 | 6–3 | Mighty Ducks of Anaheim (1995–96) | 6–5–3 | W |
| 15 | November 10, 1995 | 6–1 | Washington Capitals (1995–96) | 7–5–3 | W |
| 16 | November 11, 1995 | 3–1 | @ Boston Bruins (1995–96) | 8–5–3 | W |
| 17 | November 14, 1995 | 2–5 | @ Florida Panthers (1995–96) | 8–6–3 | L |
| 18 | November 16, 1995 | 5–4 OT | @ Tampa Bay Lightning (1995–96) | 9–6–3 | W |
| 19 | November 18, 1995 | 2–1 | Winnipeg Jets (1995–96) | 10–6–3 | W |
| 20 | November 21, 1995 | 5–2 | St. Louis Blues (1995–96) | 11–6–3 | W |
| 21 | November 24, 1995 | 0–4 | Hartford Whalers (1995–96) | 11–7–3 | L |
| 22 | November 25, 1995 | 2–2 OT | @ St. Louis Blues (1995–96) | 11–7–4 | T |
| 23 | November 28, 1995 | 3–4 | @ Winnipeg Jets (1995–96) | 11–8–4 | L |
| 24 | November 30, 1995 | 2–3 | @ Philadelphia Flyers (1995–96) | 11–9–4 | L |

December: 8–4–2 (home: 3–2–1; road: 5–2–1)

| Game | Date | Score | Opponent | Record | Recap |
|---|---|---|---|---|---|
| 25 | December 2, 1995 | 4–4 OT | Mighty Ducks of Anaheim (1995–96) | 11–9–5 | T |
| 26 | December 5, 1995 | 4–1 | Ottawa Senators (1995–96) | 12–9–5 | W |
| 27 | December 7, 1995 | 2–1 | @ New Jersey Devils (1995–96) | 13–9–5 | W |
| 28 | December 9, 1995 | 3–1 | Dallas Stars (1995–96) | 14–9–5 | W |
| 29 | December 11, 1995 | 1–5 | Colorado Avalanche (1995–96) | 14–10–5 | L |
| 30 | December 14, 1995 | 4–1 | @ San Jose Sharks (1995–96) | 15–10–5 | W |
| 31 | December 16, 1995 | 6–3 | @ Los Angeles Kings (1995–96) | 16–10–5 | W |
| 32 | December 17, 1995 | 3–2 OT | @ Mighty Ducks of Anaheim (1995–96) | 17–10–5 | W |
| 33 | December 20, 1995 | 2–4 | Chicago Blackhawks (1995–96) | 17–11–5 | L |
| 34 | December 21, 1995 | 3–3 OT | @ Chicago Blackhawks (1995–96) | 17–11–6 | T |
| 35 | December 23, 1995 | 6–1 | Edmonton Oilers (1995–96) | 18–11–6 | W |
| 36 | December 27, 1995 | 0–4 | @ Calgary Flames (1995–96) | 18–12–6 | L |
| 37 | December 29, 1995 | 2–3 | @ Colorado Avalanche (1995–96) | 18–13–6 | L |
| 38 | December 30, 1995 | 4–3 OT | @ St. Louis Blues (1995–96) | 19–13–6 | W |

January: 3–6–3 (home: 2–3–2; road: 1–3–1)

| Game | Date | Score | Opponent | Record | Recap |
|---|---|---|---|---|---|
| 39 | January 1, 1996 | 1–0 | @ Dallas Stars (1995–96) | 20–13–6 | W |
| 40 | January 3, 1996 | 4–4 OT | Boston Bruins (1995–96) | 20–13–7 | T |
| 41 | January 5, 1996 | 1–3 | @ Buffalo Sabres (1995–96) | 20–14–7 | L |
| 42 | January 6, 1996 | 5–2 | Colorado Avalanche (1995–96) | 21–14–7 | W |
| 43 | January 10, 1996 | 5–4 | Los Angeles Kings (1995–96) | 22–14–7 | W |
| 44 | January 11, 1996 | 3–4 | @ New York Islanders (1995–96) | 22–15–7 | L |
| 45 | January 13, 1996 | 2–5 | Vancouver Canucks (1995–96) | 22–16–7 | L |
| 46 | January 17, 1996 | 2–4 | Winnipeg Jets (1995–96) | 22–17–7 | L |
| 47 | January 24, 1996 | 2–2 OT | Chicago Blackhawks (1995–96) | 22–17–8 | T |
| 48 | January 27, 1996 | 2–2 OT | @ Ottawa Senators (1995–96) | 22–17–9 | T |
| 49 | January 30, 1996 | 2–4 | @ Detroit Red Wings (1995–96) | 22–18–9 | L |
| 50 | January 31, 1996 | 0–4 | St. Louis Blues (1995–96) | 22–19–9 | L |

February: 3–9–1 (home: 2–4–1; road: 1–5–0)

| Game | Date | Score | Opponent | Record | Recap |
|---|---|---|---|---|---|
| 51 | February 3, 1996 | 1–4 | Montreal Canadiens (1995–96) | 22–20–9 | L |
| 52 | February 5, 1996 | 4–6 | @ San Jose Sharks (1995–96) | 22–21–9 | L |
| 53 | February 7, 1996 | 2–1 | @ Mighty Ducks of Anaheim (1995–96) | 23–21–9 | W |
| 54 | February 8, 1996 | 3–4 | @ Los Angeles Kings (1995–96) | 23–22–9 | L |
| 55 | February 10, 1996 | 2–2 OT | Buffalo Sabres (1995–96) | 23–22–10 | T |
| 56 | February 12, 1996 | 4–1 | Pittsburgh Penguins (1995–96) | 24–22–10 | W |
| 57 | February 14, 1996 | 4–3 | San Jose Sharks (1995–96) | 25–22–10 | W |
| 58 | February 16, 1996 | 3–4 | @ Washington Capitals (1995–96) | 25–23–10 | L |
| 59 | February 18, 1996 | 2–3 | Detroit Red Wings (1995–96) | 25–24–10 | L |
| 60 | February 21, 1996 | 2–3 OT | Tampa Bay Lightning (1995–96) | 25–25–10 | L |
| 61 | February 22, 1996 | 3–5 | @ Detroit Red Wings (1995–96) | 25–26–10 | L |
| 62 | February 24, 1996 | 2–3 | Dallas Stars (1995–96) | 25–27–10 | L |
| 63 | February 28, 1996 | 3–4 | @ Winnipeg Jets (1995–96) | 25–28–10 | L |

March: 6–6–2 (home: 3–2–2; road: 3–4–0)

| Game | Date | Score | Opponent | Record | Recap |
|---|---|---|---|---|---|
| 64 | March 2, 1996 | 1–5 | @ Dallas Stars (1995–96) | 25–29–10 | L |
| 65 | March 3, 1996 | 0–4 | @ Colorado Avalanche (1995–96) | 25–30–10 | L |
| 66 | March 6, 1996 | 2–2 OT | New Jersey Devils (1995–96) | 25–30–11 | T |
| 67 | March 8, 1996 | 4–7 | @ Hartford Whalers (1995–96) | 25–31–11 | L |
| 68 | March 9, 1996 | 4–3 | Calgary Flames (1995–96) | 26–31–11 | W |
| 69 | March 13, 1996 | 3–3 OT | Winnipeg Jets (1995–96) | 26–31–12 | T |
| 70 | March 15, 1996 | 3–0 | Dallas Stars (1995–96) | 27–31–12 | W |
| 71 | March 17, 1996 | 4–2 | Vancouver Canucks (1995–96) | 28–31–12 | W |
| 72 | March 19, 1996 | 5–6 | @ Detroit Red Wings (1995–96) | 28–32–12 | L |
| 73 | March 20, 1996 | 3–4 OT | Detroit Red Wings (1995–96) | 28–33–12 | L |
| 74 | March 23, 1996 | 0–4 | Philadelphia Flyers (1995–96) | 28–34–12 | L |
| 75 | March 25, 1996 | 4–2 | @ Calgary Flames (1995–96) | 29–34–12 | W |
| 76 | March 27, 1996 | 6–2 | @ Vancouver Canucks (1995–96) | 30–34–12 | W |
| 77 | March 30, 1996 | 4–3 | @ Edmonton Oilers (1995–96) | 31–34–12 | W |

April: 3–2–0 (home: 2–1–0; road: 1–1–0)

| Game | Date | Score | Opponent | Record | Recap |
|---|---|---|---|---|---|
| 78 | April 3, 1996 | 2–5 | Chicago Blackhawks (1995–96) | 31–35–12 | L |
| 79 | April 4, 1996 | 3–1 | @ St. Louis Blues (1995–96) | 32–35–12 | W |
| 80 | April 6, 1996 | 5–1 | St. Louis Blues (1995–96) | 33–35–12 | W |
| 81 | April 11, 1996 | 2–5 | @ Chicago Blackhawks (1995–96) | 33–36–12 | L |
| 82 | April 13, 1996 | 6–3 | Edmonton Oilers (1995–96) | 34–36–12 | W |

Legend: W Win (2 points) L Loss (0 points) T Tie (1 point)

=== Playoffs ===
1996 Stanley Cup playoffs
Western Conference Quarterfinals vs. (5) St. Louis Blues: Blues win 4–2

| Game | Date | Score | Opponent | Series | Recap |
|---|---|---|---|---|---|
| 1 | April 16, 1996 | 1–3 | St. Louis Blues | Blues lead 1–0 | L |
| 2 | April 18, 1996 | 5–4 OT | St. Louis Blues | Series tied 1–1 | W |
| 3 | April 21, 1996 | 2–3 OT | @ St. Louis Blues | Blues lead 2–1 | L |
| 4 | April 23, 1996 | 1–5 | @ St. Louis Blues | Blues lead 3–1 | L |
| 5 | April 25, 1996 | 5–4 OT | St. Louis Blues | Blues lead 3–2 | W |
| 6 | April 27, 1996 | 1–2 | @ St. Louis Blues | Blues win 4–2 | L |

Legend: W Win L Loss

== Player statistics ==
=== Scoring ===
- Position abbreviations: C = Centre; D = Defence; G = Goaltender; LW = Left wing; RW = Right wing
- † = Joined team via a transaction (e.g., trade, waivers, signing) during the season. Stats reflect time with the Maple Leafs only.
- ‡ = Left team via a transaction (e.g., trade, waivers, release) during the season. Stats reflect time with the Maple Leafs only.

| No. | Player | Pos | Regular season | | | | | | Playoffs | | | | | |
| No. | Player | Pos | GP | G | A | Pts | +/- | PIM | GP | G | A | Pts | +/- | PIM |
|---|---|---|---|---|---|---|---|---|---|---|---|---|---|---|
| 13 | Mats Sundin | RW | 76 | 33 | 50 | 83 | 8 | 46 | 6 | 3 | 1 | 4 | −8 | 4 |
| 93 | Doug Gilmour | C | 81 | 32 | 40 | 72 | −5 | 77 | 6 | 1 | 7 | 8 | −4 | 12 |
| 55 | Larry Murphy | D | 82 | 12 | 49 | 61 | −2 | 34 | 6 | 0 | 2 | 2 | −8 | 4 |
| 11 | Mike Gartner | RW | 82 | 35 | 19 | 54 | 5 | 52 | 6 | 4 | 1 | 5 | −5 | 4 |
| 14 | Dave Andreychuk‡ | LW | 61 | 20 | 24 | 44 | −11 | 54 | — | — | — | — | — | — |
| 33 | Benoit Hogue‡ | LW | 44 | 12 | 25 | 37 | 6 | 68 | — | — | — | — | — | — |
| 19 | Kenny Jonsson‡ | D | 50 | 4 | 22 | 26 | 12 | 22 | — | — | — | — | — | — |
| 21 | Kirk Muller† | C | 36 | 9 | 16 | 25 | −3 | 42 | 6 | 3 | 2 | 5 | −1 | 0 |
| 23 | Todd Gill | D | 74 | 7 | 18 | 25 | −15 | 116 | 6 | 0 | 0 | 0 | −2 | 24 |
| 15 | Dave Gagner† | LW | 28 | 7 | 15 | 22 | −2 | 59 | 6 | 0 | 2 | 2 | −5 | 6 |
| 4 | Dave Ellett | D | 80 | 3 | 19 | 22 | −10 | 59 | 6 | 0 | 0 | 0 | −5 | 4 |
| 9 | Mike Craig | LW | 70 | 8 | 12 | 20 | −8 | 42 | 6 | 0 | 0 | 0 | 0 | 18 |
| 24 | Randy Wood‡ | LW | 46 | 7 | 9 | 16 | −4 | 36 | — | — | — | — | — | — |
| 17 | Wendel Clark† | LW | 13 | 8 | 7 | 15 | 7 | 16 | 6 | 2 | 2 | 4 | −6 | 2 |
| 7 | Sergio Momesso‡ | LW | 54 | 7 | 8 | 15 | −11 | 112 | — | — | — | — | — | — |
| 8 | Todd Warriner | C | 57 | 7 | 8 | 15 | −11 | 26 | 6 | 1 | 1 | 2 | 0 | 2 |
| 28 | Tie Domi | RW | 72 | 7 | 6 | 13 | −3 | 297 | 6 | 0 | 2 | 2 | 0 | 4 |
| 16 | Darby Hendrickson‡ | LW | 46 | 6 | 6 | 12 | −2 | 47 | — | — | — | — | — | — |
| 26 | Dmitri Yushkevich | D | 69 | 1 | 10 | 11 | −14 | 54 | 4 | 0 | 0 | 0 | 1 | 0 |
| 25 | Paul DiPietro | C | 20 | 4 | 4 | 8 | −3 | 4 | — | — | — | — | — | — |
| 34 | Jamie Macoun | D | 82 | 0 | 8 | 8 | 2 | 87 | 6 | 0 | 2 | 2 | 3 | 8 |
| 12 | Brandon Convery | C | 11 | 5 | 2 | 7 | −7 | 4 | 5 | 0 | 0 | 0 | 0 | 2 |
| 72 | Mathieu Schneider† | D | 13 | 2 | 5 | 7 | −2 | 10 | 6 | 0 | 4 | 4 | −7 | 8 |
| 22 | Ken Baumgartner‡ | LW | 60 | 2 | 3 | 5 | −5 | 152 | — | — | — | — | — | — |
| 37 | Mark Kolesar | RW | 21 | 2 | 2 | 4 | 0 | 14 | 3 | 1 | 0 | 1 | 1 | 2 |
| 18 | Wayne Presley† | RW | 19 | 2 | 2 | 4 | −4 | 14 | 5 | 0 | 0 | 0 | 0 | 2 |
| 15 | Mike Hudson‡ | RW | 27 | 2 | 0 | 2 | −5 | 29 | — | — | — | — | — | — |
| 10 | Bill Berg‡ | LW | 23 | 1 | 1 | 2 | −6 | 33 | — | — | — | — | — | — |
| 32 | Nick Kypreos† | LW | 19 | 1 | 1 | 2 | 0 | 30 | 5 | 0 | 0 | 0 | 0 | 4 |
| 20 | Zdenek Nedved | RW | 7 | 1 | 1 | 2 | −1 | 6 | — | — | — | — | — | — |
| 40 | Kelly Fairchild | C | 1 | 0 | 1 | 1 | 1 | 2 | — | — | — | — | — | — |
| 2 | Rob Zettler | D | 29 | 0 | 1 | 1 | −1 | 48 | 2 | 0 | 0 | 0 | 0 | 0 |
| 33 | Don Beaupre† | G | 8 | 0 | 0 | 0 | | 14 | 2 | 0 | 0 | 0 | | 0 |
| 52 | Sean Haggerty‡ | LW | 1 | 0 | 0 | 0 | 0 | 0 | — | — | — | — | — | — |
| 38 | David Harlock | D | 1 | 0 | 0 | 0 | 0 | 0 | — | — | — | — | — | — |
| 36 | Jamie Heward | D | 5 | 0 | 0 | 0 | −1 | 0 | — | — | — | — | — | — |
| 3 | Matt Martin | D | 13 | 0 | 0 | 0 | −1 | 14 | — | — | — | — | — | — |
| 29 | Felix Potvin | G | 69 | 0 | 0 | 0 | | 4 | 6 | 0 | 0 | 0 | | 2 |
| 1 | Damian Rhodes‡ | G | 11 | 0 | 0 | 0 | | 0 | — | — | — | — | — | — |
| 18 | Peter White† | C | 1 | 0 | 0 | 0 | 0 | 0 | — | — | — | — | — | — |

=== Goaltending ===
- † = Joined team via a transaction (e.g., trade, waivers, signing) during the season. Stats reflect time with the Maple Leafs only.
- ‡ = Left team via a transaction (e.g., trade, waivers, release) during the season. Stats reflect time with the Maple Leafs only.

| No. | Player | Regular season | | | | | | | | | | Playoffs | | | | | | | | |
| No. | Player | GP | W | L | T | SA | GA | GAA | SV% | SO | TOI | GP | W | L | SA | GA | GAA | SV% | SO | TOI |
|---|---|---|---|---|---|---|---|---|---|---|---|---|---|---|---|---|---|---|---|---|
| 29 | Felix Potvin | 69 | 30 | 26 | 11 | 2135 | 192 | 2.87 | .910 | 2 | 4009 | 6 | 2 | 4 | 198 | 19 | 3.26 | .904 | 0 | 350 |
| 1 | Damian Rhodes‡ | 11 | 4 | 5 | 1 | 301 | 29 | 2.79 | .904 | 0 | 624 | — | — | — | — | — | — | — | — | — |
| 33 | Don Beaupre† | 8 | 0 | 5 | 0 | 170 | 26 | 4.64 | .847 | 0 | 336 | 2 | 0 | 0 | 13 | 2 | 5.88 | .846 | 0 | 20 |

== Awards and records ==
=== Awards ===
| Type | Award/honour | Recipient | Ref |
|---|---|---|---|
| League (in-season) | NHL All-Star Game selection | Mike Gartner | |
| League (in-season) | NHL All-Star Game selection | Larry Murphy (Note: Murphy was an injury replacement for Gary Suter of the Chicago Blackhawks.) | |
| League (in-season) | NHL All-Star Game selection | Felix Potvin | |
| League (in-season) | NHL All-Star Game selection | Mats Sundin | |
| Team | Molson Cup | Felix Potvin | |

=== Milestones ===
| Milestone | Player | Date | Ref |
|---|---|---|---|
| First game | Mark Kolesar | October 28, 1995 | |
| First game | Jamie Heward | February 3, 1996 | |
| First game | Sean Haggerty | February 22, 1996 | |
| First game | Brandon Convery | March 2, 1996 | |
| First game | Kelly Fairchild | March 20, 1996 | |
| 1,000th point | Doug Gilmour | December 23, 1995 | |
| 1,000th point | Larry Murphy | March 27, 1996 | |

== Transactions ==
The Maple Leafs have been involved in the following transactions during the 1995-96 season.

=== Trades ===
| August 30, 1995 | To Philadelphia Flyers 1st round pick in 1996 – Dainius Zubrus; 4th round pick in 1996 – Mikael Simons; 2nd round pick in 1997 – Jean-Marc Pelletier | To Toronto Maple Leafs Dmitry Yushkevich; 2nd round pick in 1996 – Francis Larivee |
| October 2, 1995 | To Colorado Avalanche Warren Rychel | To Toronto Maple Leafs 7th round pick in 1997 – Shawn Thornton |
| December 4, 1995 | To Edmonton Oilers Kent Manderville | To Toronto Maple Leafs Peter White; 4th round pick in 1996 – Jason Sessa |
| January 23, 1996 | To New York Islanders Damian Rhodes; Ken Belanger | To Toronto Maple Leafs Don Beaupre; Kirk Muller |
| January 28, 1996 | To Dallas Stars Randy Wood; Benoit Hogue | To Toronto Maple Leafs Dave Gagner; 6th round pick in 1996 – Dmitri Yakushin |
| January 29, 1996 | To Chicago Blackhawks Cash | To Toronto Maple Leafs Mike Pomichter |
| February 29, 1996 | To New York Rangers Sergio Momesso; Bill Berg | To Toronto Maple Leafs Nick Kypreos; Wayne Presley |
| March 13, 1996 | To New Jersey Devils Dave Andreychuk | To Toronto Maple Leafs 2nd round pick in 1996 – Marek Posmyk; 4th round pick in 1998 – Kristian Antila |
| March 13, 1996 | To New York Islanders Darby Hendrickson; Sean Haggerty; Kenny Jonsson; 1st round pick in 1997 – Roberto Luongo | To Toronto Maple Leafs Wendel Clark; Mathieu Schneider; D. J. Smith |
| March 20, 1996 | To Mighty Ducks of Anaheim Ken Baumgartner | To Toronto Maple Leafs 4th round pick in 1996 – Kim Staal |
| June 14, 1996 | To San Jose Sharks Todd Gill | To Toronto Maple Leafs Jamie Baker; 5th round pick in 1996 – Peter Cava |
| June 22, 1996 | To Phoenix Coyotes Mike Gartner | To Toronto Maple Leafs 4th round pick in 1996 – Vladimir Antipov |
| June 22, 1996 | To Calgary Flames Dave Gagner | To Toronto Maple Leafs 3rd round pick in 1996 – Mike Lankshear |

=== Waivers ===
| October 2, 1995 | To St. Louis Blues Pat Jablonski |
| January 4, 1996 | To St. Louis Blues Mike Hudson |

=== Free agents ===
| Player / Former team; Mike Hudson / Pittsburgh Penguins | Player / New team; Grant Jennings / Buffalo Sabres |

== Draft picks ==
Toronto's draft picks at the 1995 NHL entry draft held at the Edmonton Coliseum in Edmonton, Alberta.

| Round | Pick | Player | Nationality | College/junior/club team |
|---|---|---|---|---|
| 1 | 15 | Jeff Ware (D) | Canada | Oshawa Generals (OHL) |
| 3 | 54 | Ryan Pepperall (RW) | Canada | Kitchener Rangers (OHL) |
| 6 | 139 | Doug Bonner (G) | United States | Seattle Thunderbirds (WHL) |
| 6 | 145 | Yannick Tremblay (D) | Canada | Beauport Harfangs (QMJHL) |
| 7 | 171 | Marek Melenovsky (C) | Czech Republic | HC Dukla Jihlava Jr. (Czech Republic) |
| 8 | 197 | Mark Murphy (LW) | United States | Stratford Cullitons (MWJBHL) |
| 9 | 223 | Danny Markov (D) | Russia | Spartak Moscow (Russia) |

== Farm teams ==
- The Maple Leafs farm team was the St. John's Maple Leafs in St. John's, Newfoundland.
