= 1995–96 Montreal Canadiens season =

NHL hockey team season

1995–96 Montreal Canadiens
- Division: 3rd Northeast
- Conference: 6th Eastern
- 1995–96 record: 40–32–10
- Home record: 23–12–6
- Road record: 17–20–4
- Goals for: 265
- Goals against: 248

Team information
- General manager: Serge Savard (Oct.); Rejean Houle (Oct.–Apr.)
- Coach: Jacques Demers (Oct.); Mario Tremblay (Oct.–Apr.)
- Captain: Mike Keane (Oct.–Dec.); Pierre Turgeon (Dec.–Apr.)
- Alternate captains: Vincent Damphousse; Lyle Odelein
- Arena: Montreal Forum and Molson Centre
- Average attendance: 18,233 (85.7%)
- Minor league affiliates: Fredericton Canadiens; Wheeling Thunderbirds

Team leaders
- Goals: Pierre Turgeon and Vincent Damphousse (38)
- Assists: Pierre Turgeon (58)
- Points: Pierre Turgeon (96)
- Penalty minutes: Lyle Odelein (230)
- Plus/minus: Peter Popovic (+21)
- Wins: Jocelyn Thibault (23)
- Goals against average: Jocelyn Thibault (2.83)

The 1995–96 Montreal Canadiens season was the club's 87th season. This season was notable for the trade of star goaltender Patrick Roy, as well as being their final season in the Montreal Forum before moving to the new Molson Centre. The club qualified for the playoffs, but lost in the first round to the New York Rangers.

== Regular season ==
At the beginning of the season, captain Mike Keane was subject to media scrutiny after speaking with Mathias Brunet of La Presse (a French language newspaper). Keane said he didn't know how to speak French; but the journalist misunderstood him, and reported him as refusing to learn how to speak French.

On October 17, 1995: Canadiens president Ronald Corey fired general manager Serge Savard and his assistants Andre Boudrias and Carol Vadnais. Head coach Jacques Demers was also relieved of his duties, while assistant coach Charles Thiffault was reassigned. This came after the Habs surrendered 20 goals in the first 4 games of the season.

October 21, 1995, Corey hired Rejean Houle as the Canadiens' new general manager. Mario Tremblay was hired as the new head coach, and Yvan Cournoyer was hired as an assistant coach. Tremblay had been goaltender Patrick Roy's roommate during his rookie season. On that same day, they beat their chief rival the Toronto Maple Leafs 4–3 in their last appearance at the Forum.

In his first 15 starts with Tremblay as head coach, Roy had 12 wins, 2 losses and 1 tie. The one tie came against the Colorado Avalanche. Despite this hot start, Roy and Tremblay clashed multiple times. While in Edmonton, Tremblay spotted Roy in the hotel bar and told him that he wanted him to leave. A conflict ensued in Montreal when Tremblay told Roy that he was not allowed to visit the trainer's room and speak to teammates unless he was injured.

On November 28, 1995, the day before a game against the Detroit Red Wings, Mario Tremblay spoke to Mario Leclerc of Le Journal de Montreal. Tremblay mentioned that he was resentful of current Red Wings head coach Scotty Bowman. The first five years of Tremblay's career were played under Bowman, and Tremblay told Leclerc that Bowman always threatened to send him to the minors. When Leclerc approached Cournoyer, he stated that he did not want to speak about Bowman. The Canadiens lost the game by a score of 3–2. The next day, the Journal de Montreal had a headline that stated "Bowman has the last word".

On February 5, 1996, Patrick Roy played the Canadiens for the first time since he was traded to the Colorado Avalanche. Roy stopped 37 of 39 shots in a 4–2 win. After the game, Roy took the game puck and flipped it to Mario Tremblay.

=== Patrick Roy's final game ===
On December 2, 1995, head coach Mario Tremblay kept goaltender Patrick Roy in goal as he conceded 9 goals on 26 shots during an 11–1 loss to Scotty Bowman's Detroit Red Wings. This was the last straw for Roy in what was already a contentious relationship with the rookie head coach. Friction between the two dated back to Roy's rookie year, when Tremblay used to needle the young Quebecer on his broken English and was critical of Roy through much of his career. The two had almost come to blows in a Long Island coffee shop before Tremblay was announced as head coach, and Tremblay's first appearance in the dressing room was greeted with snickers from Roy. They almost fought a second time after Tremblay fired a shot at Roy's throat during practice.

After Roy was replaced midway through the second period, he went over to Canadiens president Ronald Corey and stated that he had played his final game with the Canadiens. He later elaborated by saying that he would not play for Montreal as long as Tremblay was coach.

=== Le Trade ===
On December 6, four days after the incident, Roy was traded to Colorado (along with team captain Mike Keane) in exchange for Jocelyn Thibault, Martin Rucinsky and Andrei Kovalenko, a deal known in Montreal as "Le Trade". Roy's relationship with the Canadiens remained strained until 2008, when it was announced that his #33 jersey would be retired. The trade benefited Colorado, as Roy helped the Avalanche win the 1996 Stanley Cup.

=== Final game at the Forum ===
On March 11, 1996, the Canadiens played their last game at the Montreal Forum, defeating the Dallas Stars 4–1 on a Monday night. The game was televised on TSN and TQS in Canada, and on ESPN in the United States. After the game, many previous hockey greats were presented to the crowd. The largest ovation of the night was left at the end for legendary Canadiens star Maurice "Rocket" Richard, at over 16 minutes in length.

=== Season standings ===
Northeast Division
No.		GP	W	L	T	GF	GA	PTS
1	**Pittsburgh Penguins**	82	49	29	4	362	284	102
2	**Boston Bruins**	82	40	31	11	282	269	91
3	**Montreal Canadiens**	82	40	32	10	265	248	90
4	Hartford Whalers	82	34	39	9	237	259	77
5	Buffalo Sabres	82	33	42	7	247	262	72
6	Ottawa Senators	82	18	59	5	191	291	41

Eastern Conference
R		Div	GP	W	L	T	GF	GA	Pts
**1**	**Philadelphia Flyers**	**ATL**	**82**	**45**	**24**	**13**	**282**	**208**	**103**
**2**	**Pittsburgh Penguins**	**NE**	**82**	**49**	**29**	**4**	**362**	**284**	**102**
**3**	**New York Rangers**	**ATL**	**82**	**41**	**27**	**14**	**272**	**237**	**96**
**4**	**Florida Panthers**	**ATL**	**82**	**41**	**31**	**10**	**254**	**234**	**92**
**5**	**Boston Bruins**	**NE**	**82**	**40**	**31**	**11**	**282**	**269**	**91**
**6**	**Montreal Canadiens**	**NE**	**82**	**40**	**32**	**10**	**265**	**248**	**90**
**7**	**Washington Capitals**	**ATL**	**82**	**39**	**32**	**11**	**234**	**204**	**89**
**8**	**Tampa Bay Lightning**	**ATL**	**82**	**38**	**32**	**12**	**238**	**248**	**88**
9	New Jersey Devils	ATL	82	37	33	12	215	202	86
10	Hartford Whalers	NE	82	34	39	9	237	259	77
11	Buffalo Sabres	NE	82	33	42	7	247	262	73
12	New York Islanders	ATL	82	22	50	10	229	315	54
13	Ottawa Senators	NE	82	18	59	5	191	291	41

Divisions: ATL – Atlantic, NE – Northeast

bold – Qualified for playoffs

== Schedule and results ==
=== Regular season ===
1995–96 regular season
October: 6–5–0 (home: 4–2–0; road: 2–3–0)

Game	Date	Score	Opponent	Record	Recap
1	October 7, 1995	1–7	Philadelphia Flyers	0–1–0	L
2	October 11, 1995	1–6	@ Florida Panthers	0–2–0	L
3	October 12, 1995	1–3	@ Tampa Bay Lightning	0–3–0	L
4	October 14, 1995	1–4	New Jersey Devils	0–4–0	L
5	October 20, 1995	0–2	@ New York Islanders	0–5–0	L
6	October 21, 1995	4–3	Toronto Maple Leafs	1–5–0	W
7	October 23, 1995	6–3	Los Angeles Kings	2–5–0	W
8	October 25, 1995	7–2	Florida Panthers	3–5–0	W
9	October 27, 1995	4–1	@ Hartford Whalers	4–5–0	W
10	October 28, 1995	5–3	Chicago Blackhawks	5–5–0	W
11	October 31, 1995	3–1	@ Boston Bruins	6–5–0	W

November: 6–5–1 (home: 3–1–1; road: 3–4–0)

Game	Date	Score	Opponent	Record	Recap
12	November 1, 1995	2–5	@ Washington Capitals	6–6–0	L
13	November 4, 1995	4–1	Boston Bruins	7–6–0	W
14	November 8, 1995	2–3 OT	Mighty Ducks of Anaheim	7–7–0	L
15	November 11, 1995	4–0	@ Calgary Flames	8–7–0	W
16	November 12, 1995	4–2	@ Vancouver Canucks	9–7–0	W
17	November 15, 1995	4–1	@ Edmonton Oilers	10–7–0	W
18	November 18, 1995	5–1	Ottawa Senators	11–7–0	W
19	November 20, 1995	4–3 OT	Hartford Whalers	12–7–0	W
20	November 22, 1995	2–4	@ Hartford Whalers	12–8–0	L
21	November 25, 1995	2–2 OT	Colorado Avalanche	12–8–1	T
22	November 28, 1995	2–3	@ Detroit Red Wings	12–9–1	L
23	November 29, 1995	4–5	@ St. Louis Blues	12–10–1	L

December: 7–6–1 (home: 3–2–1; road: 4–4–0)

Game	Date	Score	Opponent	Record	Recap
24	December 2, 1995	1–11	Detroit Red Wings	12–11–1	L
25	December 6, 1995	4–2	New Jersey Devils	13–11–1	W
26	December 7, 1995	5–7	@ Pittsburgh Penguins	13–12–1	L
27	December 9, 1995	2–2 OT	New York Rangers	13–12–2	T
28	December 12, 1995	6–5	@ Winnipeg Jets	14–12–2	W
29	December 15, 1995	4–1	@ Chicago Blackhawks	15–12–2	W
30	December 16, 1995	2–4	Philadelphia Flyers	15–13–2	L
31	December 18, 1995	3–2	Hartford Whalers	16–13–2	W
32	December 20, 1995	1–2	@ Buffalo Sabres	16–14–2	L
33	December 22, 1995	4–2	@ Pittsburgh Penguins	17–14–2	W
34	December 23, 1995	1–0	Pittsburgh Penguins	18–14–2	W
35	December 26, 1995	0–4	@ Washington Capitals	18–15–2	L
36	December 28, 1995	1–3	@ Tampa Bay Lightning	18–16–2	L
37	December 30, 1995	4–1	@ Ottawa Senators	19–16–2	W

January: 6–3–4 (home: 3–2–3; road: 3–1–1)

Game	Date	Score	Opponent	Record	Recap
38	January 3, 1996	4–7	@ New York Rangers	19–17–2	L
39	January 4, 1996	2–2 OT	@ New York Islanders	19–17–3	T
40	January 6, 1996	6–7	Buffalo Sabres	19–18–3	L
41	January 8, 1996	3–3 OT	Tampa Bay Lightning	19–18–4	T
42	January 10, 1996	2–2 OT	Vancouver Canucks	19–18–5	T
43	January 12, 1996	6–5	@ Pittsburgh Penguins	20–18–5	W
44	January 13, 1996	3–3 OT	St. Louis Blues	20–18–6	T
45	January 17, 1996	3–0	@ Ottawa Senators	21–18–6	W
46	January 22, 1996	1–4	Tampa Bay Lightning	21–19–6	L
47	January 25, 1996	6–2	@ Florida Panthers	22–19–6	W
48	January 27, 1996	4–1	Winnipeg Jets	23–19–6	W
49	January 28, 1996	5–4	Boston Bruins	24–19–6	W
50	January 31, 1996	5–3	Washington Capitals	25–19–6	W

February: 5–7–1 (home: 3–1–0; road: 2–6–1)

Game	Date	Score	Opponent	Record	Recap
51	February 1, 1996	2–3 OT	@ Philadelphia Flyers	25–20–6	L
52	February 3, 1996	4–1	@ Toronto Maple Leafs	26–20–6	W
53	February 5, 1996	2–4	@ Colorado Avalanche	26–21–6	L
54	February 7, 1996	4–2	@ Dallas Stars	27–21–6	W
55	February 10, 1996	3–5	Ottawa Senators	27–22–6	L
56	February 12, 1996	3–0	San Jose Sharks	28–22–6	W
57	February 15, 1996	2–2 OT	@ New York Rangers	28–22–7	T
58	February 17, 1996	5–1	Calgary Flames	29–22–7	W
59	February 21, 1996	3–5	@ Hartford Whalers	29–23–7	L
60	February 23, 1996	5–6	@ New Jersey Devils	29–24–7	L
61	February 24, 1996	7–3	Pittsburgh Penguins	30–24–7	W
62	February 26, 1996	4–7	@ San Jose Sharks	30–25–7	L
63	February 28, 1996	2–5	@ Mighty Ducks of Anaheim	30–26–7	L

March: 9–3–1 (home: 6–2–0; road: 3–1–1)

Game	Date	Score	Opponent	Record	Recap
64	March 2, 1996	4–5	@ Los Angeles Kings	30–27–7	L
65	March 9, 1996	3–2	Ottawa Senators	31–27–7	W
66	March 11, 1996	4–1	Dallas Stars	32–27–7	W
67	March 13, 1996	1–1 OT	@ New Jersey Devils	32–27–8	T
68	March 16, 1996	4–2	New York Rangers	33–27–8	W
69	March 18, 1996	3–2	Buffalo Sabres	34–27–8	W
70	March 20, 1996	3–2	Hartford Whalers	35–27–8	W
71	March 22, 1996	4–1	@ Buffalo Sabres	36–27–8	W
72	March 23, 1996	5–6	Edmonton Oilers	36–28–8	L
73	March 25, 1996	4–1	New York Islanders	37–28–8	W
74	March 27, 1996	0–1 OT	Washington Capitals	37–29–8	L
75	March 28, 1996	4–3 OT	@ Boston Bruins	38–29–8	W
76	March 30, 1996	3–1	@ Ottawa Senators	39–29–8	W

April: 1–3–2 (home: 1–2–1; road: 0–1–1)

Game	Date	Score	Opponent	Record	Recap
77	April 1, 1996	4–6	Buffalo Sabres	39–30–8	L
78	April 3, 1996	1–4	Boston Bruins	39–31–8	L
79	April 4, 1996	3–3 OT	@ Boston Bruins	39–31–9	T
80	April 6, 1996	2–1	Florida Panthers	40–31–9	W
81	April 11, 1996	2–3	@ Philadelphia Flyers	40–32–9	L
82	April 13, 1996	5–5 OT	New York Islanders	40–32–10	T

Legend: W Win (2 points) L Loss (0 points) T Tie (1 point)

=== Playoffs ===
1996 Stanley Cup playoffs
Eastern Conference Quarterfinals vs. (3) New York Rangers – Rangers win 4–2

Game	Date	Score	Opponent	Series	Recap
1	April 16, 1996	3–2 OT	@ New York Rangers	Canadiens lead 1–0	W
2	April 18, 1996	5–3	@ New York Rangers	Canadiens lead 2–0	W
3	April 21, 1996	1–2	New York Rangers	Canadiens lead 2–1	L
4	April 23, 1996	3–4	New York Rangers	Series tied 2–2	L
5	April 26, 1996	2–3	@ New York Rangers	Rangers lead 3–2	L
6	April 28, 1996	3–5	New York Rangers	Rangers win 4–2	L

Legend: W Win L Loss

== Player statistics ==
=== Scoring ===
- Position abbreviations: C = Centre; D = Defence; G = Goaltender; LW = Left wing; RW = Right wing
- † = Joined team via a transaction (e.g., trade, waivers, signing) during the season. Stats reflect time with the Canadiens only.
- ‡ = Left team via a transaction (e.g., trade, waivers, release) during the season. Stats reflect time with the Canadiens only.

No.	Player	Pos	Regular season						Playoffs					
No.	Player	Pos	GP	G	A	Pts	+/-	PIM	GP	G	A	Pts	+/-	PIM
77	Pierre Turgeon	C	80	38	58	96	19	44	6	2	4	6	1	2
25	Vincent Damphousse	C	80	38	56	94	5	158	6	4	4	8	2	0
8	Mark Recchi	RW	82	28	50	78	20	69	6	3	3	6	1	0
26	Martin Rucinsky†	LW	56	25	35	60	8	54	—	—	—	—	—	—
11	Saku Koivu	C	82	20	25	45	−7	40	6	3	1	4	2	8
18	Valeri Bure	RW	77	22	20	42	10	28	6	0	1	1	−1	6
43	Patrice Brisebois	D	69	9	27	36	10	65	6	1	2	3	2	6
51	Andrei Kovalenko†	RW	51	17	17	34	9	33	6	0	0	0	−2	6
49	Brian Savage	LW	75	25	8	33	−8	28	6	0	2	2	2	2
38	Vladimir Malakhov	D	61	5	23	28	7	79	—	—	—	—	—	—
30	Turner Stevenson	RW	80	9	16	25	−2	167	6	0	1	1	−1	2
24	Lyle Odelein	D	79	3	14	17	8	230	6	1	1	2	1	6
5	Stephane Quintal	D	68	2	14	16	−4	117	6	0	1	1	1	6
22	Benoit Brunet	LW	26	7	8	15	−4	17	3	0	2	2	1	0
34	Peter Popovic	D	76	2	12	14	21	69	6	0	2	2	3	4
6	Oleg Petrov	RW	36	4	7	11	−9	23	5	0	1	1	−1	0
28	Marc Bureau	C	65	3	7	10	−3	46	6	1	1	2	2	4
57	Chris Murray	RW	48	3	4	7	5	163	4	0	0	0	0	4
12	Mike Keane‡	RW	18	0	7	7	−6	6	—	—	—	—	—	—
27	David Wilkie	D	24	1	5	6	−10	10	6	1	2	3	1	12
52	Craig Rivet	D	19	1	4	5	4	54	—	—	—	—	—	—
35	Donald Brashear	LW	67	0	4	4	−10	223	6	0	0	0	−1	2
23	Marko Kiprusoff	D	24	0	4	4	−3	8	—	—	—	—	—	—
29	Yves Racine‡	D	25	0	3	3	−7	26	—	—	—	—	—	—
56	Scott Fraser	C	15	2	0	2	−1	4	—	—	—	—	—	—
53	Rory Fitzpatrick	D	42	0	2	2	−7	18	6	1	1	2	−1	0
46	Craig Ferguson‡	C	10	1	0	1	−5	2	—	—	—	—	—	—
48	J. J. Daigneault‡	D	7	0	1	1	0	6	—	—	—	—	—	—
48	Francois Groleau	D	2	0	1	1	2	2	—	—	—	—	—	—
39	Pat Jablonski†	G	23	0	1	1		2	1	0	0	0		0
71	Sebastien Bordeleau	C	4	0	0	0	−1	0	—	—	—	—	—	—
20	Craig Conroy	C	7	0	0	0	−4	2	—	—	—	—	—	—
3	Robert Dirk†	D	3	0	0	0	0	6	—	—	—	—	—	—
31	Patrick Labrecque	G	2	0	0	0		2	—	—	—	—	—	—
17	Mark Lamb	C	1	0	0	0	0	0	—	—	—	—	—	—
33	Patrick Roy‡	G	22	0	0	0		6	—	—	—	—	—	—
26	Yves Sarault‡	LW	14	0	0	0	−7	4	—	—	—	—	—	—
37	Jose Theodore	G	1	0	0	0		0	—	—	—	—	—	—
41	Jocelyn Thibault†	G	40	0	0	0		2	6	0	0	0		0
42	Darcy Tucker	RW	3	0	0	0	−1	0	—	—	—	—	—	—

=== Goaltending ===
- † = Joined team via a transaction (e.g., trade, waivers, signing) during the season. Stats reflect time with the Canadiens only.
- ‡ = Left team via a transaction (e.g., trade, waivers, release) during the season. Stats reflect time with the Canadiens only.

No.	Player	Regular season										Playoffs								
No.	Player	GP	W	L	T	SA	GA	GAA	SV%	SO	TOI	GP	W	L	SA	GA	GAA	SV%	SO	TOI
41	Jocelyn Thibault†	40	23	13	3	1258	110	2.83	.913	3	2334	6	2	4	188	18	3.47	.904	0	311
33	Patrick Roy‡	22	12	9	1	667	62	2.95	.907	1	1260	—	—	—	—	—	—	—	—	—
39	Pat Jablonski†	23	5	9	6	676	62	2.94	.908	0	1264	1	0	0	17	1	1.24	.941	0	49
31	Patrick Labrecque	2	0	1	0	47	7	4.29	.851	0	98	—	—	—	—	—	—	—	—	—
37	Jose Theodore	1	0	0	0	2	1	6.69	.500	0	9	—	—	—	—	—	—	—	—	—

== Awards and records ==
=== Awards ===
Type	Award/honour	Recipient	Ref
League (in-season)	NHL All-Star Game selection	Pierre Turgeon	
Team	Jacques Beauchamp Molson Trophy	Peter Popovic	
Team	Molson Cup	Pierre Turgeon	

=== Milestones ===
Milestone	Player	Date	Ref
First game	Marko Kiprusoff	October 7, 1995	
First game	Saku Koivu	October 7, 1995	
First game	Patrick Labrecque	October 7, 1995	
First game	Scott Fraser	November 28, 1995	
First game	Rory Fitzpatrick	December 15, 1995	
First game	Darcy Tucker	January 13, 1996	
First game	Sebastien Bordeleau	February 5, 1996	
First game	Jose Theodore	February 21, 1996	
First game	Francois Groleau	April 3, 1996	

== Draft picks ==
Montreal's draft picks at the 1995 NHL entry draft held at the Edmonton Coliseum in Edmonton, Alberta.

Round	#	Player	Position	Nationality	College/Junior/Club team
1	8	Terry Ryan	Left wing	Canada	Tri-City Americans (WHL)
3	60	Miloslav Guren	Defence	Czech Republic	HC Zlín (Czech)
3	74	Martin Hohenberger	Left wing	Austria	Prince George Cougars (WHL)
4	86	Jonathan Delisle	Right wing	Canada	Hull Olympiques (QMJHL)
5	112	Niklas Anger	Right wing	Sweden	Djurgårdens IF (Sweden)
6	138	Boyd Olson	Centre	Canada	Tri-City Americans (WHL)
7	164	Stephane Robidas	Defence	Canada	Shawinigan Cataractes (QMJHL)
8	190	Greg Hart	Right wing	Canada	Kamloops Blazers (WHL)
9	216	Eric Houde	Centre	Canada	Halifax Mooseheads (QMJHL)

== See also ==
- 1995–96 NHL season
