= Mark Cornforth =

Canadian ice hockey player (born 1972)

- Born: November 13, 1972 (age 52); Montreal, Quebec, Canada
- Height: 6 ft 1 in (185 cm)
- Weight: 185 lb (84 kg; 13 st 3 lb)
- Position: Defence
- Shot: Left
- Played for: Boston Bruins
- NHL draft: Undrafted
- Playing career: 1994–2000

Mark Cornforth (born November 13, 1972) is a Canadian retired ice hockey defenseman who played six regular season games for the Boston Bruins of the National Hockey League, during the 1995–96 season. He scored no points and collected four penalty minutes.

He later became an educator and coaches high school ice hockey and tennis.

== Biography ==
=== Early life and education ===
Cornforth was born in Montreal, Quebec, Canada on November 13, 1972. He attended Lower Canada College, a private all boys' school in Montreal. He then played in the Canadian Junior Hockey League for two years before attending Merrimack College, where he was captain of both the varsity tennis and ice hockey teams. He also received the Distinguished Scholar Award during his senior year at Merrimack, was recognized as a four-time member of the All-Academic Hockey East Team, and was selected as the Northeast Tennis Player of the Year. He graduated from Merrimack with a degree in Accounting and was on the Dean's List all four years there.

=== Professional ice hockey career ===
After Merrimack, and a two-game stint in the American Hockey League's Syracuse Crunch in 1994–1995, He did not make the NHL out of camp and spent most of the 1995–1996 season with the Providence Bruins, but Cornforth signed a free agent deal with the Boston Bruins in 1995. He played his first NHL exhibition game in his hometown of Montreal in the Montreal Forum. He played six games but was unable to score any points. He returned to the Providence Bruins after that, and stayed in the minors for the rest of his career. He split his time between the American Hockey League and the now-defunct International Hockey League. He played on the Cleveland Lumberjacks 1997–1998, the Grand Rapids Griffins 1998, and the Providence Bruins and Springfield Falcons 1998–1999. In the 1999–2000 season, he played just two games, one for the Lowell Lock Monsters and one for the Springfield Falcons, and retired in 2000.

=== Post-hockey career ===
After retiring from hockey, he attended Olin Graduate School of Business at Babson College. He earned a Master of Business Administration (MBA), and graduated Magna Cum Laude. While studying at Olin, he worked at Citizens Schools, part of Boston Public Schools, teaching Entrepreneurship. He later worked as an accountant with Antiss & Company and as a Finance Project Manager at Fidelity Investments.

In 2015, Cornforth was hired as the new boys' varsity hockey coach by Catholic Memorial School in West Roxbury, Massachusetts, in an "extremely competitive process." He would also be working as the Assistant Director of Admissions. CM President Peter F. Folan commented on the hiring:

"Mark Cornforth is a great educator who believes deeply in the mission of Catholic education. He brings great and diverse talents to the CM community. He has great hockey knowledge and experience at all levels of the game. We are thrilled to have Mark mentor and guide students both on and off of the ice. His professional experience, educational background, and athletic knowledge will have a positive impact on all CM students."

== Career statistics ==
=== Regular season and playoffs ===
			Regular season					Playoffs
Season	Team	League	GP	G	A	Pts	PIM	GP	G	A	Pts	PIM
1988–89	Montreal Bourassa	QAAA	36	4	11	15	16	7	0	8	8	8
1989–90	Pembroke Lumber Kings	CCHL	56	17	25	42	104	4	0	1	1	25
1990–91	Pembroke Lumber Kings	CCHL	17	9	11	20	52	—	—	—	—	—
1990–91	Brockville Braves	CCJL	36	12	23	35	84	—	—	—	—	—
1991–92	Merrimack College	HE	23	1	9	10	40	—	—	—	—	—
1992–93	Merrimack College	HE	36	3	18	21	75	—	—	—	—	—
1993–94	Merrimack College	HE	37	5	13	18	58	—	—	—	—	—
1994–95	Merrimack College	HE	30	8	20	28	93	—	—	—	—	—
1994–95	Syracuse Crunch	AHL	2	0	1	1	2	—	—	—	—	—
1995–96	Boston Bruins	NHL	6	0	0	0	4	—	—	—	—	—
1995–96	Providence Bruins	AHL	65	5	10	15	117	4	0	0	0	4
1996–97	Providence Bruins	AHL	61	8	12	20	47	—	—	—	—	—
1996–97	Cleveland Lumberjacks	IHL	13	1	4	5	25	14	1	3	4	29
1997–98	Cleveland Lumberjacks	IHL	68	5	15	20	146	—	—	—	—	—
1997–98	Grand Rapids Griffins	IHL	8	1	2	3	20	3	0	0	0	17
1998–99	Providence Bruins	AHL	15	1	1	2	16	—	—	—	—	—
1998–99	Springfield Falcons	AHL	5	0	0	0	2	—	—	—	—	—
1999–00	Lowell Lock Monsters	AHL	1	0	0	0	2	—	—	—	—	—
1999–00	Springfield Falcons	AHL	1	0	0	0	2	—	—	—	—	—
AHL totals			150	14	24	38	188	4	0	0	0	4
NHL totals			6	0	0	0	0	—	—	—	—	—

== Personal life ==
Cornforth is married to Stacey and has three children, Ava, Meredith, and Gavin. He is fluent in French.

He is a practicing Roman Catholic and is a member of St. Elizabeth's Parish in Milton, Massachusetts, and a former parishioner of Holy Name Church in West Roxbury.
