= Ron Asselstine =

Canadian ice hockey official

Ron Asselstine (born November 6, 1946) is a retired Canadian ice hockey official who served as a linesman in the National Hockey League and as both a referee and linesman in the World Hockey Association.

Asselstine was born in Toronto, Ontario, and grew up in Guelph, Ontario. He began his NHL officiating career in 1979 following a distinguished tenure in the WHA and continued until his retirement in 1997. Throughout his career, he officiated 2,002 regular-season games across both leagues, 92 NHL playoff games, and three All-Star Games. From the mid-1980s onward, he wore a helmet on the ice and donned uniform number 38 from the 1994–95 season until he stepped away. Known for his commanding presence and firm handling of on-ice altercations, the 6 ft 2 in (1.88 m), 225 lb (102.1 kg) linesman earned the nickname "Bear" for his tough, authoritative style.

On January 28, 1989, at the Boston Garden, a fan ran onto the ice during a game and made his way toward referee Bill McCreary. Linesman Asselstine sprinted after the intruder and body-checked him from behind near the goal line, launching the fan approximately 12 feet (3.7 m) into the end boards. The individual, 22-year-old Frank Barbaro Jr., was then restrained by Boston Police, taken into custody, and charged with trespassing and disorderly conduct.

In 2007, Asselstine received the Caring Canadian Award in recognition of his efforts as the founder of the Guelph Wish Fund for Children, which he established in 1984. The award was presented to him by Governor General Michaëlle Jean.
