= Rob Tallas =

Canadian ice hockey player and coach (born 1973)

- Born: March 20, 1973 (age 53) Edmonton, Alberta, Canada
- Height: 6 ft 0 in (183 cm)
- Weight: 178 lb (81 kg; 12 st 10 lb)
- Position: Goaltender
- Caught: Left
- Played for: Boston Bruins; Chicago Blackhawks
- NHL draft: Undrafted
- Playing career: 1994–2005

Robert Wayne "Robbie" Tallas (born March 20, 1973) is a Canadian former professional ice hockey goaltender. He played in the National Hockey League (NHL) with the Boston Bruins and Chicago Blackhawks between 1996 and 2001.

== Playing career ==
Tallas played in 99 NHL games and compiled a record of 28 wins, 42 losses, and 10 ties. He has been serving as the goaltending coach for the Florida Panthers since August 2009.

He came out of retirement for one game on March 3, 2013, as a backup goalie for the Florida Panthers. Then, exactly two years later, on March 3, 2015, during a game against the Toronto Maple Leafs, both Panthers goaltenders (Roberto Luongo and Al Montoya) were injured during play. Montoya stayed in the game, and Tallas quickly went to the dressing room to dress as his emergency backup. He warmed up in the tunnel, but Luongo was able to re-dress and return to the game, sparing Tallas from action. In both instances, Tallas had suited up, registered on the official team roster, and could have been called on the ice as a replacement but ended up not playing because the originally planned goaltender returned before a replacement was needed.

Tallas was also part of the coaching staff of Italy men's national ice hockey team during the 2019 IIHF World Championship.

Tallas won back-to-back Stanley Cup championships as a goaltending coach with the Panthers in 2024 and 2025.

== Career statistics ==
=== Regular season and playoffs ===
			Regular season									Playoffs
Season	Team	League	GP	W	L	T	MIN	GA	SO	GAA	SV%	GP	W	L	MIN	GA	SO	GAA	SV%
1990–91	Penticton Panthers	BCJHL	37	6	26	0	2,055	196	0	5.72	.860	—	—	—	—	—	—	—	—
1991–92	Seattle Thunderbirds	WHL	14	4	7	0	708	52	0	4.41	.854	—	—	—	—	—	—	—	—
1991–92	Surrey Eagles	BCJHL	19	6	12	0	1,043	112	1	6.44	.844	—	—	—	—	—	—	—	—
1992–93	Seattle Thunderbirds	WHL	58	23	21	3	3,151	194	2	3.69	.893	5	1	4	333	18	0	3.24	.912
1993–94	Seattle Thunderbirds	WHL	51	23	21	3	2,849	188	0	3.96	.885	9	5	4	567	40	0	4.23	.885
1994–95	Providence Bruins	AHL	2	1	0	0	82	4	1	2.90	.867	—	—	—	—	—	—	—	—
1994–95	Charlotte Checkers	ECHL	36	21	9	3	2,011	114	0	3.40	.882	—	—	—	—	—	—	—	—
1995–96	Providence Bruins	AHL	37	12	16	7	2,136	117	1	3.29	.906	2	0	2	135	9	0	4.01	.900
1995–96	Boston Bruins	NHL	1	1	0	0	60	3	0	3.00	.897	—	—	—	—	—	—	—	—
1996–97	Providence Bruins	AHL	24	9	14	1	1,424	83	0	3.50	.900	—	—	—	—	—	—	—	—
1996–97	Boston Bruins	NHL	28	8	12	1	1,244	69	1	3.33	.882	—	—	—	—	—	—	—	—
1997–98	Providence Bruins	AHL	10	1	8	1	575	39	0	4.07	.882	—	—	—	—	—	—	—	—
1997–98	Boston Bruins	NHL	14	6	3	3	788	24	1	1.83	.926	—	—	—	—	—	—	—	—
1998–99	Boston Bruins	NHL	17	7	7	2	987	43	1	2.61	.898	—	—	—	—	—	—	—	—
1999–00	Boston Bruins	NHL	27	4	13	4	1,363	72	0	2.61	.885	—	—	—	—	—	—	—	—
2000–01	Chicago Wolves	IHL	3	0	1	0	87	6	0	4.13	.850	—	—	—	—	—	—	—	—
2000–01	Chicago Blackhawks	NHL	12	2	7	0	627	35	0	3.35	.868	—	—	—	—	—	—	—	—
2000–01	Norfolk Admirals	AHL	6	2	2	2	333	12	0	2.16	.915	—	—	—	—	—	—	—	—
2001–02	Wilkes-Barre/Scranton Penguins	AHL	38	6	25	5	2,183	126	0	3.46	.901	—	—	—	—	—	—	—	—
2002–03	Wilkes-Barre/Scranton Penguins	AHL	33	14	11	3	1,763	99	0	3.37	.898	—	—	—	—	—	—	—	—
2003–04	HPK Hameenlinna	FIN	22	8	8	44	1,326	44	1	1.99	.922	—	—	—	—	—	—	—	—
2004–05	Salzburg EC	AUT	15	1	10	0	640	47	0	4.40	.862	—	—	—	—	—	—	—	—
2012–13	Florida Panthers	NHL	0	—	—	—	—	—	—	—	—	—	—	—	—	—	—	—	—
2014–15	Florida Panthers	NHL	0	—	—	—	—	—	—	—	—	—	—	—	—	—	—	—	—
NHL totals			99	28	42	10	5,069	246	3	2.91	.891	—	—	—	—	—	—	—	—
