= Peter Allen (ice hockey) =

Canadian former ice hockey defenceman

- Born: March 6, 1970 (age 55); Calgary, Alberta, Canada
- Height: 6 ft 2 in (188 cm)
- Weight: 200 lb (91 kg; 14 st 4 lb)
- Position: Defence
- Shot: Right
- Played for: Pittsburgh Penguins; Schwenningen Wild Wings
- National team: Canada
- NHL draft: 1991 NHL Supplemental Draft; Boston Bruins
- Playing career: 1993–2004

Peter Allen
Medal record

Representing Canada

Men's ice hockey

World Championships
Bronze medal – third place	1995 Sweden	Ice hockey

Peter Allen (born March 6, 1970) is a Canadian former ice hockey defenceman. He played 8 games in the National Hockey League with the Pittsburgh Penguins during the 1995–96 season. The rest of his career, which lasted from 1993 to 2004, was mainly spent in the minor leagues and then in Europe.

== Playing career ==
Born in Calgary, Alberta, Allen was taken in the 1991 NHL Supplemental Draft by the Boston Bruins from Yale University. After graduation in 1993, he had a spell with the Canadian National Team before spells in the East Coast Hockey League with the Richmond Renegades and in the American Hockey League for the Prince Edward Island Senators. Another sting with Team Canada followed, including in the 1995 World Championships, winning a bronze medal. Afterwards he signed with the Pittsburgh Penguins as a free agent and played eight games for them during the 1995–96 season but failed to register a point. He spent much of his tenure with the International Hockey League's Cleveland Lumberjacks.

In 1997, Allen signed with the San Jose Sharks, but was assigned to the AHL's Kentucky Thoroughblades and never played for San Jose. Afterwards, Allen played in European leagues, beginning in the Swiss Nationalliga B with EHC Chur. He then played in Germany's Deutsche Eishockey Liga for the Schwenninger Wild Wings and in the German 2nd Bundesliga for EC Bad Nauheim before retiring in 2004.

== Career statistics ==
=== Regular season and playoffs ===
			Regular season					Playoffs
Season	Team	League	GP	G	A	Pts	PIM	GP	G	A	Pts	PIM
1988–89	Calgary Canucks	AJHL	58	7	31	38	80	—	—	—	—	—
1989–90	Yale University	ECAC	26	2	4	6	16	—	—	—	—	—
1990–91	Yale University	ECAC	17	0	6	6	14	—	—	—	—	—
1991–92	Yale University	ECAC	26	6	12	18	26	—	—	—	—	—
1992–93	Yale University	ECAC	30	3	15	18	32	—	—	—	—	—
1993–94	Richmond Renegades	ECHL	52	2	16	18	62	—	—	—	—	—
1993–94	Prince Edward Island Senators	AHL	6	0	1	1	6	—	—	—	—	—
1993–94	Canadian National Team	Intl	14	2	3	5	15	—	—	—	—	—
1994–95	Canadian National Team	Intl	52	5	15	20	36	—	—	—	—	—
1995–96	Pittsburgh Penguins	NHL	8	0	0	0	8	—	—	—	—	—
1995–96	Cleveland Lumberjacks	IHL	65	3	45	48	55	3	0	0	0	2
1996–97	Cleveland Lumberjacks	IHL	14	31	45	75	14	0	6	6	24
1997–98	Kentucky Thoroughblades	AHL	72	0	18	18	73	3	0	1	1	4
1998–99	Kentucky Thoroughblades	AHL	72	3	17	20	48	12	1	1	2	8
1999–00	EHC Chur	NLB	1	0	1	1	12	12	4	4	8	10
1999–00	Canadian National Team	Intl	49	5	20	25	30	—	—	—	—	—
2000–01	Schwenningen Wild Wings	DEL	60	3	21	24	38	—	—	—	—	—
2001–02	Schwenningen Wild Wings	DEL	60	2	11	13	38	—	—	—	—	—
2002–03	EC Bad Nauheim	GER-2	54	9	31	40	69	5	1	3	4	8
2003–04	EC Bad Nauheim	GER-2	45	2	24	26	75	10	1	3	4	8
DEL totals			120	5	32	37	76	7	0	0	0	0
NHL totals			8	0	0	0	8	—	—	—	—	—

=== International ===
Year	Team	Event	GP	G	A	Pts	PIM
1995	Canada	WC	7	0	0	0	4
Senior totals			7	0	0	0	4

== Transactions ==
- On June 2, 1991 the Boston Bruins selected Peter Allen in the first-round (#24 overall) of the 1991 NHL supplemental draft.
- On August 10, 1995 the Pittsburgh Penguins signed free agent Peter Allen.
- On August 15, 1997 the San Jose Sharks signed unrestricted free agent Peter Allen.
- On September 16, 1999 the Vancouver Canucks released Peter Allen.
