= 1996 National Hockey League All-Star Game =

Professional ice hockey exhibition game

1996 NHL All-Star Game
	1	2	3	Total
West	0	3	1	4
East	2	2	1	5
- Date: January 20, 1996
- Arena: FleetCenter
- City: Boston
- MVP: Ray Bourque (Boston)
- Attendance: 17,565

The 1996 National Hockey League All-Star Game took place at the FleetCenter in Boston on January 20, 1996. The 46th game was originally scheduled to take place in 1995, but the lockout of the 1994–95 NHL season led to its postponement.

== Super Skills Competition ==
The Western Conference would win their third-straight Skills Competition on a second round tie-breaking penalty shot goal. In the individual events Sergei Fedorov tied the record for Fastest Skater (13.510s '93 Gartner), only a few races later to have Mike Gartner break his previous record by finishing the event at 13.386 seconds, which stood as the record until Dylan Larkin scored a 13.172 second skate in 2016. Mark Messier would win the Accuracy Shooting event by becoming the second player to hit four targets on four shots.

=== Individual event winners ===
- Puck Control Relay – Pierre Turgeon (Montreal Canadiens)
- Fastest Skater – Mike Gartner (Toronto Maple Leafs) – 13.386 seconds
- Accuracy Shooting – Mark Messier (New York Rangers) – 4 hits, 4 shots
- Hardest Shot – Dave Manson (Winnipeg Jets) – 98.0 mph
- Goaltenders Competition - Dominik Hasek (Buffalo Sabres) - 4 GA, 16 shots

== The game ==
Boston Bruins' defensemen Ray Bourque scored with just 37.3 seconds remaining in regulation to lift the Eastern Conference to a 5–4 victory in front of the home crowd in Boston. For his heroics, the 17-year veteran was named All-Star M.V.P.

The East built a 2–0 lead after the first period as New Jersey Devils' goaltender Martin Brodeur was able to stop all 12 shots. Philadelphia Flyers' Eric Lindros and New York Rangers' Pat Verbeek opened the scoring in the first period. In the second period, Pittsburgh Penguins' Jaromir Jagr would score to increase the East lead to 3–0. However, the Western Conference responded by scoring three of the next four goals in the second period to pull within one, going into the third. Winnipeg Jets' Teemu Selanne tied he game at 4–4 with 3:29 remaining, before Bourque scored the winning goal.

=== Additional information ===
This was also the first game where the FoxTrax was used in the All-Star Game. Jim Kelley revealed on Prime Time Sports that Dominik Hasek, the winning goaltender, was chosen as the game MVP but he overruled the vote because Bourque scored the game winner and the game was in Boston, where Bourque played most of his career. The losing goaltender was the Chicago Blackhawks' Ed Belfour, starting his fourth All-Star Game. The third Eastern Conference goaltender, Jim Carey of the Washington Capitals, would later in the 1995–96 NHL season win the Vezina Trophy as hockey's best goaltender. All three Eastern Conference goalies, and Western Conference goalie Chris Osgood were making their All-Star debuts in Boston.

Beginning with this year's All Star Game, the head coaches were selected by whose team had the best regular season record in his respective conference, during the season up to the All-Star break. Before this, the head coaches of the previous season's Stanley Cup finalist were chosen.

=== Summary ===
	Western Conference	Eastern Conference
Final score	4	5
Scoring summary	Hull (Kariya, Coffey), 5:33 2nd; Coffey (Fedorov, Mogilny), 11:42 2nd; Kariya (Sundin), 17:47 2nd; Selanne (unassisted), 16:31 3rd	Lindros (Leetch, LeClair), 11:05 1st; Verbeek (Lemieux, Schneider), 13:49 1st; Jagr (Lemieux, Francis), 2:07 2nd; Shanahan (Turgeon, Neely), 8:51 2nd; Bourque (Verbeek, Messier), 19:22 3rd (GWG)
Penalties	Western, too many men 4:35, 1st	Eastern, too many men 15:14 2nd
Shots on goal	12–7–13–32	18–15–8–41
Win/loss	L - Felix Potvin	W - Dominik Hasek

- Referee: Mark Faucette
- Linesmen: Ron Asselstine, Brad Lazarowich
- Television: Fox

== Rosters ==
	Western Conference	Eastern Conference
Head coach	(Canada) Scotty Bowman (Detroit Red Wings)	(Canada) Doug MacLean (Florida Panthers)
Honorary captain	(Canada) Glenn Hall	(Canada) Bobby Orr
Assistant coach	(Canada) Marc Crawford (Colorado Avalanche)	(Canada) Eddie Johnston (Pittsburgh Penguins)
Lineup	Starting lineup: (United States) 7 – D Chris Chelios (Chicago Blackhawks), Alternate; (Canada) 9 – LW Paul Kariya (Mighty Ducks of Anaheim); (United States) 16 – RW Brett Hull (St. Louis Blues); (Canada) 30 – G Ed Belfour (Chicago Blackhawks); (Canada) 77 – D Paul Coffey (Detroit Red Wings), Alternate; (Canada) 99 – C Wayne Gretzky (Los Angeles Kings), Captain; Commissioner's selection: (Canada) 18 – C Denis Savard (Chicago Blackhawks); Reserves: (Canada) 2 – D Al MacInnis (St. Louis Blues); (United States) 4 – D Kevin Hatcher (Dallas Stars); (Sweden) 5 – D Nicklas Lidstrom (Detroit Red Wings); (Finland) 8 – RW Teemu Selanne (Winnipeg Jets); (Canada) 11 – RW Owen Nolan (San Jose Sharks); (Sweden) 13 – C Mats Sundin (Toronto Maple Leafs); (Canada) 14 – RW Theoren Fleury (Calgary Flames); (Canada) 19 – C Joe Sakic (Colorado Avalanche); (Sweden) 21 – C Peter Forsberg (Colorado Avalanche); (Canada) 22 – RW Mike Gartner (Toronto Maple Leafs); (Canada) 29 – G Felix Potvin (Toronto Maple Leafs); (Canada) 31 – G Chris Osgood (Detroit Red Wings); (United States) 39 – C Doug Weight (Edmonton Oilers); (Canada) 55 – D Larry Murphy (Toronto Maple Leafs); (Russia) 89 – LW Alexander Mogilny (Vancouver Canucks); (Russia) 91 – C Sergei Fedorov (Detroit Red Wings)	Starting lineup: (Canada) 4 – D Scott Stevens (New Jersey Devils); (Canada) 30 – G Martin Brodeur (New Jersey Devils); (Canada) 66 – C Mario Lemieux (Pittsburgh Penguins), Alternate; (Czech Republic) 68 – RW Jaromir Jagr (Pittsburgh Penguins); (Canada) 77 – D Ray Bourque (Boston Bruins), Captain; (Canada) 94 – LW Brendan Shanahan (Hartford Whalers); Commissioner's selection: (Canada) 14 – C Craig MacTavish (Philadelphia Flyers); Reserves: (United States) 2 – D Brian Leetch (New York Rangers); (Canada) 7 – C Pierre Turgeon (Montreal Canadiens); (Canada) 8 – LW Cam Neely (Boston Bruins); (Canada) 10 – C Ron Francis (Pittsburgh Penguins); (Canada) 11 – C Mark Messier (New York Rangers), Alternate; (Slovakia) 12 – LW Peter Bondra (Washington Capitals); (Sweden) 15 – RW Daniel Alfredsson (Ottawa Senators); (Canada) 16 – RW Pat Verbeek (New York Rangers); (United States) 20 – LW John LeClair (Philadelphia Flyers); (Canada) 27 – RW Scott Mellanby (Florida Panthers); (United States) 34 – G John Vanbiesbrouck (Florida Panthers); (Canada) 37 - D Eric Desjardins (Philadelphia Flyers); (Czech Republic) 39 - G Dominik Hasek (Buffalo Sabres); (Czech Republic) 44 – D Roman Hamrlik (Tampa Bay Lightning); (United States) 72 – D Mathieu Schneider (New York Islanders); (Canada) 88 – C Eric Lindros (Philadelphia Flyers)

== See also ==
- 1995–96 NHL season

== Notes ==
- ^+ Even though he participated in the Super Skills Competition, Dave Manson was not in the Western Conference All-Star roster.
- ^1 Pavel Bure was voted as a starter, but was not able to play due to injury. Paul Kariya was his replacement in the starting lineup.

Murphy replaced Gary Suter, who was injured, in the lineup.
