= 1995–96 San Jose Sharks season =

National Hockey League team season

1995–96 San Jose Sharks
- Division: 7th Pacific
- Conference: 13th Western
- 1995–96 record: 20–55–7
- Home record: 12–26–3
- Road record: 8–29–4
- Goals for: 252
- Goals against: 357

Team information
- General manager: Chuck Grillo (Oct.–Mar.); Dean Lombardi
- Coach: Kevin Constantine (Oct.–Dec.); Jim Wiley (Dec.–Apr.)
- Captain: Jeff Odgers
- Arena: San Jose Arena
- Average attendance: 17,190
- Minor league affiliates: Kansas City Blades; Mobile Mysticks

Team leaders
- Goals: Owen Nolan (29)
- Assists: Craig Janney (49)
- Points: Craig Janney (62)
- Penalty minutes: Jeff Odgers (192)
- Plus/minus: Darren Turcotte (+8)
- Wins: Chris Terreri (13)
- Goals against average: Chris Terreri (3.70)

The 1995–96 San Jose Sharks season was the Sharks' fifth season of operation in the National Hockey League (NHL). The Sharks failed to make the playoffs for the first time since 1993, finishing with the worst record in the NHL that season.

== Regular season ==
On December 2, head coach Kevin Constantine was fired after a 3–18–4 start and replaced by assistant coach Jim Wiley.

On March 6, director of player personnel and effectively co-general manager Chuck Grillo was fired, leaving Dean Lombardi as the sole general manager of the team.

The Sharks allowed the most goals (357), the most even-strength goals (244), the most power-play goals (93), had the lowest penalty-kill percentage (76.57%), the fewest shutouts for (0) and the fewest shots on goal (2,143). On January 13, 1996, Ray Sheppard scored a hat trick as the Sharks defeated the Pittsburgh Penguins 10–8 in Pittsburgh. It was the highest scoring game of the NHL regular season.

=== Final standings ===
Pacific Division
No.		GP	W	L	T	GF	GA	Pts
1	**Colorado Avalanche**	82	47	25	10	326	240	104
2	**Calgary Flames**	82	34	37	11	241	240	79
3	**Vancouver Canucks**	82	32	35	15	278	278	79
4	Mighty Ducks of Anaheim	82	35	39	8	234	247	78
5	Edmonton Oilers	82	30	44	8	240	304	68
6	Los Angeles Kings	82	24	40	18	256	302	66
7	San Jose Sharks	82	20	55	7	252	357	47

Note: GP = Games played; W = Wins; L = Losses; T = Ties; GF = Goals for; GA = Goals against; Pts = Points
Bolded teams qualified for the playoffs.

Western Conference
R		Div	GP	W	L	T	GF	GA	Pts
**1**	**p – Detroit Red Wings**	**CEN**	**82**	**62**	**13**	**7**	**325**	**181**	**131**
**2**	**Colorado Avalanche**	**PAC**	**82**	**47**	**25**	**10**	**326**	**240**	**104**
**3**	**Chicago Blackhawks**	**CEN**	**82**	**40**	**28**	**14**	**273**	**220**	**94**
**4**	**Toronto Maple Leafs**	**CEN**	**82**	**34**	**36**	**12**	**247**	**252**	**80**
**5**	**St. Louis Blues**	**CEN**	**82**	**32**	**34**	**16**	**219**	**248**	**80**
**6**	**Calgary Flames**	**PAC**	**82**	**34**	**37**	**11**	**241**	**240**	**79**
**7**	**Vancouver Canucks**	**PAC**	**82**	**32**	**35**	**15**	**278**	**278**	**79**
**8**	**Winnipeg Jets**	**CEN**	**82**	**36**	**40**	**6**	**275**	**291**	**78**
9	Mighty Ducks of Anaheim	PAC	82	35	39	8	234	247	78
10	Edmonton Oilers	PAC	82	30	44	8	240	304	68
11	Dallas Stars	CEN	82	26	42	14	227	280	66
12	Los Angeles Kings	PAC	82	24	40	18	256	302	66
13	San Jose Sharks	PAC	82	20	55	7	252	357	47

Divisions: CEN – Central, PAC – Pacific

bold – Qualified for playoffs; p – Won Presidents' Trophy

== Schedule and results ==
1995–96 regular season
October: 0–7–3 (home: 0–5–1; road: 0–2–2)

Game	Date	Score	Opponent	Record	Recap
1	October 7, 1995	3–4	Chicago Blackhawks (1995–96)	0–1–0	L
2	October 12, 1995	6–6 OT	Boston Bruins (1995–96)	0–1–1	T
3	October 14, 1995	6–7	Vancouver Canucks (1995–96)	0–2–1	L
4	October 17, 1995	2–7	@ Toronto Maple Leafs (1995–96)	0–3–1	L
5	October 19, 1995	3–3 OT	@ Winnipeg Jets (1995–96)	0–3–2	T
6	October 22, 1995	1–1 OT	@ Edmonton Oilers (1995–96)	0–3–3	T
7	October 25, 1995	1–6	Winnipeg Jets (1995–96)	0–4–3	L
8	October 28, 1995	3–4	Dallas Stars (1995–96)	0–5–3	L
9	October 30, 1995	3–4	@ Vancouver Canucks (1995–96)	0–6–3	L
10	October 31, 1995	3–5	New York Rangers (1995–96)	0–7–3	L

November: 3–10–1 (home: 2–4–1; road: 1–6–0)

Game	Date	Score	Opponent	Record	Recap
11	November 2, 1995	3–3 OT	New Jersey Devils (1995–96)	0–7–4	T
12	November 4, 1995	7–3	St. Louis Blues (1995–96)	1–7–4	W
13	November 7, 1995	3–7	@ Hartford Whalers (1995–96)	1–8–4	L
14	November 8, 1995	2–7	@ Buffalo Sabres (1995–96)	1–9–4	L
15	November 10, 1995	1–9	Pittsburgh Penguins (1995–96)	1–10–4	L
16	November 11, 1995	2–5	Detroit Red Wings (1995–96)	1–11–4	L
17	November 14, 1995	3–5	New York Islanders (1995–96)	1–12–4	L
18	November 16, 1995	1–3	@ St. Louis Blues (1995–96)	1–13–4	L
19	November 17, 1995	1–2	@ Dallas Stars (1995–96)	1–14–4	L
20	November 19, 1995	3–2	@ Chicago Blackhawks (1995–96)	2–14–4	W
21	November 21, 1995	2–3	@ Washington Capitals (1995–96)	2–15–4	L
22	November 22, 1995	2–5	@ Detroit Red Wings (1995–96)	2–16–4	L
23	November 25, 1995	7–2	Vancouver Canucks (1995–96)	3–16–4	W
24	November 29, 1995	3–5	Calgary Flames (1995–96)	3–17–4	L

December: 5–8–0 (home: 4–3–0; road: 1–5–0)

Game	Date	Score	Opponent	Record	Recap
25	December 1, 1995	2–7	@ Vancouver Canucks (1995–96)	3–18–4	L
26	December 2, 1995	5–3	Washington Capitals (1995–96)	4–18–4	W
27	December 5, 1995	2–12	@ Colorado Avalanche (1995–96)	4–19–4	L
28	December 7, 1995	5–3	Winnipeg Jets (1995–96)	5–19–4	W
29	December 9, 1995	2–4	Edmonton Oilers (1995–96)	5–20–4	L
30	December 12, 1995	2–1	Ottawa Senators (1995–96)	6–20–4	W
31	December 14, 1995	1–4	Toronto Maple Leafs (1995–96)	6–21–4	L
32	December 16, 1995	2–3	@ St. Louis Blues (1995–96)	6–22–4	L
33	December 17, 1995	2–4	@ Dallas Stars (1995–96)	6–23–4	L
34	December 19, 1995	7–4	@ Mighty Ducks of Anaheim (1995–96)	7–23–4	W
35	December 22, 1995	4–3	Los Angeles Kings (1995–96)	8–23–4	W
36	December 26, 1995	1–5	Colorado Avalanche (1995–96)	8–24–4	L
37	December 29, 1995	2–4	@ Mighty Ducks of Anaheim (1995–96)	8–25–4	L

January: 3–10–0 (home: 1–4–0; road: 2–6–0)

Game	Date	Score	Opponent	Record	Recap
38	January 3, 1996	1–3	Philadelphia Flyers (1995–96)	8–26–4	L
39	January 5, 1996	2–5	Los Angeles Kings (1995–96)	8–27–4	L
40	January 6, 1996	5–7	@ Los Angeles Kings (1995–96)	8–28–4	L
41	January 8, 1996	2–5	Florida Panthers (1995–96)	8–29–4	L
42	January 10, 1996	4–7	@ New York Rangers (1995–96)	8–30–4	L
43	January 11, 1996	2–1	@ New Jersey Devils (1995–96)	9–30–4	W
44	January 13, 1996	10–8	@ Pittsburgh Penguins (1995–96)	10–30–4	W
45	January 16, 1996	1–4	@ Florida Panthers (1995–96)	10–31–4	L
46	January 17, 1996	4–6	@ Tampa Bay Lightning (1995–96)	10–32–4	L
47	January 24, 1996	2–4	@ Detroit Red Wings (1995–96)	10–33–4	L
48	January 25, 1996	1–2	@ Chicago Blackhawks (1995–96)	10–34–4	L
49	January 27, 1996	3–4 OT	Colorado Avalanche (1995–96)	10–35–4	L
50	January 30, 1996	8–2	Hartford Whalers (1995–96)	11–35–4	W

February: 3–7–2 (home: 2–1–1; road: 1–6–1)

Game	Date	Score	Opponent	Record	Recap
51	February 1, 1996	6–6 OT	Los Angeles Kings (1995–96)	11–35–5	T
52	February 3, 1996	1–4	Chicago Blackhawks (1995–96)	11–36–5	L
53	February 5, 1996	6–4	Toronto Maple Leafs (1995–96)	12–36–5	W
54	February 10, 1996	6–1	@ Los Angeles Kings (1995–96)	13–36–5	W
55	February 12, 1996	0–3	@ Montreal Canadiens (1995–96)	13–37–5	L
56	February 14, 1996	3–4	@ Toronto Maple Leafs (1995–96)	13–38–5	L
57	February 15, 1996	2–2 OT	@ Ottawa Senators (1995–96)	13–38–6	T
58	February 17, 1996	2–4	@ New York Islanders (1995–96)	13–39–6	L
59	February 20, 1996	3–5	@ Calgary Flames (1995–96)	13–40–6	L
60	February 23, 1996	1–3	@ Vancouver Canucks (1995–96)	13–41–6	L
61	February 25, 1996	3–4	@ Mighty Ducks of Anaheim (1995–96)	13–42–6	L
62	February 26, 1996	7–4	Montreal Canadiens (1995–96)	14–42–6	W

March: 4–9–1 (home: 1–7–0; road: 3–2–1)

Game	Date	Score	Opponent	Record	Recap
63	March 1, 1996	3–7	Tampa Bay Lightning (1995–96)	14–43–6	L
64	March 3, 1996	1–5	Calgary Flames (1995–96)	14–44–6	L
65	March 5, 1996	5–3	@ Colorado Avalanche (1995–96)	15–44–6	W
66	March 6, 1996	1–2	Dallas Stars (1995–96)	15–45–6	L
67	March 8, 1996	2–4	@ Edmonton Oilers (1995–96)	15–46–6	L
68	March 10, 1996	6–4	Buffalo Sabres (1995–96)	16–46–6	W
69	March 13, 1996	3–8	Edmonton Oilers (1995–96)	16–47–6	L
70	March 15, 1996	2–4	St. Louis Blues (1995–96)	16–48–6	L
71	March 17, 1996	2–8	@ Philadelphia Flyers (1995–96)	16–49–6	L
72	March 18, 1996	3–3 OT	@ Boston Bruins (1995–96)	16–49–7	T
73	March 20, 1996	7–1	@ Winnipeg Jets (1995–96)	17–49–7	W
74	March 22, 1996	2–1 OT	@ Calgary Flames (1995–96)	18–49–7	W
75	March 28, 1996	3–8	Colorado Avalanche (1995–96)	18–50–7	L
76	March 31, 1996	2–4	Mighty Ducks of Anaheim (1995–96)	18–51–7	L

April: 2–4–0 (home: 2–2–0; road: 0–2–0)

Game	Date	Score	Opponent	Record	Recap
77	April 2, 1996	6–3	Detroit Red Wings (1995–96)	19–51–7	W
78	April 4, 1996	5–3	Edmonton Oilers (1995–96)	20–51–7	W
79	April 6, 1996	1–5	@ Colorado Avalanche (1995–96)	20–52–7	L
80	April 7, 1996	3–5	Mighty Ducks of Anaheim (1995–96)	20–53–7	L
81	April 10, 1996	2–6	@ Los Angeles Kings (1995–96)	20–54–7	L
82	April 12, 1996	0–6	Calgary Flames (1995–96)	20–55–7	L

Legend: W Win (2 points) L Loss (0 points) T Tie (1 point)

== Player statistics ==
=== Scoring ===
- Position abbreviations: C = Center; D = Defense; G = Goaltender; LW = Left wing; RW = Right wing
- † = Joined team via a transaction (e.g., trade, waivers, signing) during the season. Stats reflect time with the Sharks only.
- ‡ = Left team via a transaction (e.g., trade, waivers, release) during the season. Stats reflect time with the Sharks only.

No.	Player	Pos	Regular season					
No.	Player	Pos	GP	G	A	Pts	+/-	PIM
15	Craig Janney‡	C	71	13	49	62	−35	26
11	Owen Nolan†	RW	72	29	32	61	−30	137
26	Ray Sheppard†‡	RW	51	27	19	46	−19	10
19	Jeff Friesen	LW	79	15	31	46	−19	42
8	Kevin Miller‡	C	68	22	20	42	−8	41
14	Ray Whitney	LW	60	17	24	41	−23	16
33	Marcus Ragnarsson	D	71	8	31	39	−24	42
13	Jamie Baker	C	77	16	17	33	−19	79
22	Ulf Dahlen	LW	59	16	12	28	−21	27
18	Chris Tancill	C	45	7	16	23	−12	20
3 (Note: Bodger wore number 5 in his first two games.)	Doug Bodger†	D	57	4	19	23	−18	50
42	Shean Donovan	RW	74	13	8	21	−17	39
38	Michal Sykora	D	79	4	16	20	−14	54
25	Viktor Kozlov	C	62	6	13	19	−15	6
34 (Note: Racine wore number 47 in his first two games.)	Yves Racine†	D	32	1	16	17	−3	28
36	Jeff Odgers	RW	78	12	4	16	−4	192
23	Andrei Nazarov	LW	42	7	7	14	−15	62
37	Ville Peltonen	LW	31	2	11	13	−7	14
43	Jan Caloun	RW	11	8	3	11	4	0
9 (Note: Turcotte wore number 47 in his first game.)	Darren Turcotte†	C	9	6	5	11	8	4
16	Dody Wood	C	32	3	6	9	0	138
4	Jay More	D	74	2	7	9	−32	147
44	Vlastimil Kroupa	D	27	1	7	8	−17	18
2	Jim Kyte	D	57	1	7	8	−12	146
40	Mike Rathje	D	27	0	7	7	−16	14
48	Alexei Yegorov	RW	9	3	2	5	−5	2
41	Tom Pederson	D	60	1	4	5	−9	40
30	Chris Terreri†	G	46	0	5	5		4
21	Dave Brown	RW	37	3	1	4	4	46
6	Sandis Ozolinsh‡	D	7	1	3	4	2	4
17	Pat Falloon‡	RW	9	3	0	3	−1	4
7	Igor Larionov‡	C	4	1	1	2	−6	0
28	Sergei Bautin†	D	1	0	0	0	−1	2
31	Wade Flaherty	G	24	0	0	0		0
32	Arturs Irbe	G	22	0	0	0		4
29	Geoff Sarjeant	G	4	0	0	0		2

=== Goaltending ===
- † = Joined team via a transaction (e.g., trade, waivers, signing) during the season. Stats reflect time with the Sharks only.

No.	Player	Regular season									
No.	Player	GP	W	L	T	SA	GA	GAA	SV%	SO	TOI
30	Chris Terreri†	46	13	29	1	1322	155	3.70	.883	0	2516
32	Arturs Irbe	22	4	12	4	607	85	4.59	.860	0	1112
31	Wade Flaherty	24	3	12	1	689	92	4.85	.866	0	1137
29	Geoff Sarjeant	4	0	2	1	87	14	4.92	.839	0	171

== Awards and records ==
=== Awards ===
Type	Award/honor	Recipient	Ref
League (annual)	Lester Patrick Trophy	George Gund III	
League (in-season)	NHL All-Star Game selection	Owen Nolan	
Team	Sharks Player of the Year	Jamie Baker	
Team	Sharks Rookie of the Year	Marcus Ragnarsson	

=== Milestones ===
Milestone	Player	Date	Ref
First game	Marcus Ragnarsson	October 7, 1995	
First game	Ville Peltonen	October 12, 1995	
First game	Alexei Yegorov	February 10, 1996	
First game	Jan Caloun	March 18, 1996	

== Draft picks ==
San Jose's draft picks at the 1995 NHL entry draft held at the Edmonton Coliseum in Edmonton, Alberta.

Round	#	Player	Position	Nationality	College/Junior/Club team
1	12	Teemu Riihijarvi	Left wing	Finland	K-Espoo Jrs
2	38	Peter Roed	Center	United States	White Bear Lake H.S
3	64	Marko Makinen	Right wing	Finland	TPS Jrs
4	90	Vesa Toskala	Goalie	Finland	Ilves Jr
5	116	Miikka Kiprusoff	Goalie	Finland	TPS Jr
5	130	Michal Bros	Center	Czech Republic	HC Olomouc
6	140	Timo Hakanen	Center	Finland	Assat Jrs
6	142	Jaroslav Kudrna	Left wing	Czech Republic	Penticton Panthers
7	167	Brad Mehalko	Right wing	Canada	Lethbridge Hurricanes
7	168	Robert Jindrich	Defense	Czech Republic	Plzen HC
8	194	Ryan Kraft	Center	United States	U. of Minnesota
9	220	Mikko Markkanen	Right wing	Finland	TPS Jrs

== See also ==
- 1995–96 NHL season
