= 1995–96 Dallas Stars season =

National Hockey League team season

1995–96 Dallas Stars
- Division: 6th Central
- Conference: 11th Western
- 1995–96 record: 26–42–14
- Home record: 14–18–9
- Road record: 12–24–5
- Goals for: 227
- Goals against: 280

Team information
- General manager: Bob Gainey
- Coach: Bob Gainey (Oct.–Jan.); Ken Hitchcock (Jan.–Apr.)
- Captain: Derian Hatcher
- Arena: Reunion Arena
- Average attendance: 15,572
- Minor league affiliates: Michigan K-Wings; Dayton Bombers

Team leaders
- Goals: Mike Modano (36)
- Assists: Mike Modano (45)
- Points: Mike Modano (81)
- Penalty minutes: Bill Huard (176)
- Plus/minus: Jere Lehtinen (+5)
- Wins: Andy Moog (13)
- Goals against average: Andy Moog (2.99)

The 1995–96 Dallas Stars season was the third National Hockey League season in Dallas, Texas (and 29th as a franchise), which would start off badly and finish badly, with a division worst 26-42-14. The Stars failed to qualify for the playoffs for the first time since 1993 when they were known as the Minnesota North Stars.

== Regular season ==
On January 8, 1996, Bob Gainey resigned as head coach and was replaced by Michigan K-Wings head coach Ken Hitchcock. Gainey remained the team's general manager.

On March 11, 1996, the Stars played in the final game at the Montreal Forum.

=== Final standings ===
Central Division
No.		GP	W	L	T	GF	GA	Pts
1	**Detroit Red Wings**	82	62	13	7	325	181	131
2	**Chicago Blackhawks**	82	40	28	14	273	220	94
3	**Toronto Maple Leafs**	82	34	36	12	247	252	80
4	**St. Louis Blues**	82	32	34	16	219	248	80
5	**Winnipeg Jets**	82	36	40	6	275	291	78
6	Dallas Stars	82	26	42	14	227	280	66

Note: GP = Games played; W = Wins; L = Losses; T = Ties; GF = Goals for; GA = Goals against; Pts = Points
Bolded teams qualified for the playoffs.

Western Conference
R		Div	GP	W	L	T	GF	GA	Pts
**1**	**p – Detroit Red Wings**	**CEN**	**82**	**62**	**13**	**7**	**325**	**181**	**131**
**2**	**Colorado Avalanche**	**PAC**	**82**	**47**	**25**	**10**	**326**	**240**	**104**
**3**	**Chicago Blackhawks**	**CEN**	**82**	**40**	**28**	**14**	**273**	**220**	**94**
**4**	**Toronto Maple Leafs**	**CEN**	**82**	**34**	**36**	**12**	**247**	**252**	**80**
**5**	**St. Louis Blues**	**CEN**	**82**	**32**	**34**	**16**	**219**	**248**	**80**
**6**	**Calgary Flames**	**PAC**	**82**	**34**	**37**	**11**	**241**	**240**	**79**
**7**	**Vancouver Canucks**	**PAC**	**82**	**32**	**35**	**15**	**278**	**278**	**79**
**8**	**Winnipeg Jets**	**CEN**	**82**	**36**	**40**	**6**	**275**	**291**	**78**
9	Mighty Ducks of Anaheim	PAC	82	35	39	8	234	247	78
10	Edmonton Oilers	PAC	82	30	44	8	240	304	68
11	Dallas Stars	CEN	82	26	42	14	227	280	66
12	Los Angeles Kings	PAC	82	24	40	18	256	302	66
13	San Jose Sharks	PAC	82	20	55	7	252	357	47

Divisions: CEN – Central, PAC – Pacific

bold – Qualified for playoffs; p – Won Presidents' Trophy

== Schedule and results ==
1995–96 regular season
October: 5–4–2 (home: 4–3–1; road: 1–1–1)

Game	Date	Score	Opponent	Record	Recap
1	October 7, 1995	5–7	@ Winnipeg Jets (1995–96)	0–1–0	L
2	October 10, 1995	7–3	Calgary Flames (1995–96)	1–1–0	W
3	October 12, 1995	1–3	St. Louis Blues (1995–96)	1–2–0	L
4	October 14, 1995	6–5	Boston Bruins (1995–96)	2–2–0	W
5	October 17, 1995	3–4	Washington Capitals (1995–96)	2–3–0	L
6	October 19, 1995	1–1 OT	@ St. Louis Blues (1995–96)	2–3–1	T
7	October 21, 1995	3–3 OT	Tampa Bay Lightning (1995–96)	2–3–2	T
8	October 24, 1995	3–0	Buffalo Sabres (1995–96)	3–3–2	W
9	October 26, 1995	5–2	Mighty Ducks of Anaheim (1995–96)	4–3–2	W
10	October 28, 1995	4–3	@ San Jose Sharks (1995–96)	5–3–2	W
11	October 30, 1995	1–6	Colorado Avalanche (1995–96)	5–4–2	L

November: 3–3–3 (home: 3–0–2; road: 0–3–1)

Game	Date	Score	Opponent	Record	Recap
12	November 1, 1995	1–1 OT	Chicago Blackhawks (1995–96)	5–4–3	T
13	November 4, 1995	1–5	@ Detroit Red Wings (1995–96)	5–5–3	L
14	November 8, 1995	3–3 OT	Los Angeles Kings (1995–96)	5–5–4	T
15	November 9, 1995	1–1 OT	@ Colorado Avalanche (1995–96)	5–5–5	T
16	November 14, 1995	2–4	@ Pittsburgh Penguins (1995–96)	5–6–5	L
17	November 15, 1995	1–2	@ Buffalo Sabres (1995–96)	5–7–5	L
18	November 17, 1995	2–1	San Jose Sharks (1995–96)	6–7–5	W
19	November 22, 1995	4–3	Vancouver Canucks (1995–96)	7–7–5	W
20	November 25, 1995	2–0	New Jersey Devils (1995–96)	8–7–5	W

December: 2–10–2 (home: 1–4–1; road: 1–6–1)

Game	Date	Score	Opponent	Record	Recap
21	December 2, 1995	2–2 OT	@ Los Angeles Kings (1995–96)	8–7–6	T
22	December 3, 1995	7–6	@ Colorado Avalanche (1995–96)	9–7–6	W
23	December 5, 1995	4–6	@ Boston Bruins (1995–96)	9–8–6	L
24	December 7, 1995	1–3	@ Detroit Red Wings (1995–96)	9–9–6	L
25	December 9, 1995	1–3	@ Toronto Maple Leafs (1995–96)	9–10–6	L
26	December 11, 1995	2–3	@ New York Rangers (1995–96)	9–11–6	L
27	December 13, 1995	4–8	Calgary Flames (1995–96)	9–12–6	L
28	December 15, 1995	1–5	Pittsburgh Penguins (1995–96)	9–13–6	L
29	December 17, 1995	4–2	San Jose Sharks (1995–96)	10–13–6	W
30	December 21, 1995	3–3 OT	New York Islanders (1995–96)	10–13–7	T
31	December 23, 1995	0–2	Chicago Blackhawks (1995–96)	10–14–7	L
32	December 26, 1995	3–5	@ Chicago Blackhawks (1995–96)	10–15–7	L
33	December 28, 1995	1–4	@ St. Louis Blues (1995–96)	10–16–7	L
34	December 29, 1995	1–2	Detroit Red Wings (1995–96)	10–17–7	L

January: 4–7–4 (home: 1–4–3; road: 3–3–1)

Game	Date	Score	Opponent	Record	Recap
35	January 1, 1996	0–1	Toronto Maple Leafs (1995–96)	10–18–7	L
36	January 3, 1996	3–3 OT	@ Detroit Red Wings (1995–96)	10–18–8	T
37	January 5, 1996	5–4	Winnipeg Jets (1995–96)	11–18–8	W
38	January 7, 1996	2–5	@ Chicago Blackhawks (1995–96)	11–19–8	L
39	January 8, 1996	4–4 OT	Los Angeles Kings (1995–96)	11–19–9	T
40	January 10, 1996	0–4	Detroit Red Wings (1995–96)	11–20–9	L
41	January 12, 1996	6–6 OT	Florida Panthers (1995–96)	11–20–10	T
42	January 14, 1996	2–7	@ New Jersey Devils (1995–96)	11–21–10	L
43	January 15, 1996	1–6	@ Philadelphia Flyers (1995–96)	11–22–10	L
44	January 17, 1996	3–4	Edmonton Oilers (1995–96)	11–23–10	L
45	January 22, 1996	6–4	@ Vancouver Canucks (1995–96)	12–23–10	W
46	January 24, 1996	5–3	@ Edmonton Oilers (1995–96)	13–23–10	W
47	January 26, 1996	4–2	@ Calgary Flames (1995–96)	14–23–10	W
48	January 29, 1996	1–2	Winnipeg Jets (1995–96)	14–24–10	L
49	January 31, 1996	1–1 OT	New York Rangers (1995–96)	14–24–11	T

February: 5–7–1 (home: 2–4–1; road: 3–3–0)

Game	Date	Score	Opponent	Record	Recap
50	February 2, 1996	4–5	Vancouver Canucks (1995–96)	14–25–11	L
51	February 4, 1996	3–5	@ New York Islanders (1995–96)	14–26–11	L
52	February 6, 1996	5–2	@ St. Louis Blues (1995–96)	15–26–11	W
53	February 7, 1996	2–4	Montreal Canadiens (1995–96)	15–27–11	L
54	February 10, 1996	3–6	St. Louis Blues (1995–96)	15–28–11	L
55	February 11, 1996	3–5	Hartford Whalers (1995–96)	15–29–11	L
56	February 16, 1996	6–1	Edmonton Oilers (1995–96)	16–29–11	W
57	February 18, 1996	4–6	@ Florida Panthers (1995–96)	16–30–11	L
58	February 19, 1996	2–4	@ Tampa Bay Lightning (1995–96)	16–31–11	L
59	February 22, 1996	3–2	Ottawa Senators (1995–96)	17–31–11	W
60	February 24, 1996	3–2	@ Toronto Maple Leafs (1995–96)	18–31–11	W
61	February 25, 1996	6–2	@ Hartford Whalers (1995–96)	19–31–11	W
62	February 28, 1996	4–4 OT	Philadelphia Flyers (1995–96)	19–31–12	T

March: 5–7–1 (home: 3–1–0; road: 2–6–1)

Game	Date	Score	Opponent	Record	Recap
63	March 2, 1996	5–1	Toronto Maple Leafs (1995–96)	20–31–12	W
64	March 5, 1996	3–1	@ Mighty Ducks of Anaheim (1995–96)	21–31–12	W
65	March 6, 1996	2–1	@ San Jose Sharks (1995–96)	22–31–12	W
66	March 11, 1996	1–4	@ Montreal Canadiens (1995–96)	22–32–12	L
67	March 13, 1996	1–4	@ Ottawa Senators (1995–96)	22–33–12	L
68	March 15, 1996	0–3	@ Toronto Maple Leafs (1995–96)	22–34–12	L
69	March 17, 1996	1–2	@ Washington Capitals (1995–96)	22–35–12	L
70	March 20, 1996	2–1	St. Louis Blues (1995–96)	23–35–12	W
71	March 22, 1996	2–5	@ Vancouver Canucks (1995–96)	23–36–12	L
72	March 23, 1996	4–4 OT	@ Los Angeles Kings (1995–96)	23–36–13	T
73	March 26, 1996	2–8	Winnipeg Jets (1995–96)	23–37–13	L
74	March 28, 1996	3–1	Mighty Ducks of Anaheim (1995–96)	24–37–13	W
75	March 31, 1996	3–5	@ Chicago Blackhawks (1995–96)	24–38–13	L

April: 2–4–1 (home: 0–2–1; road: 2–2–0)

Game	Date	Score	Opponent	Record	Recap
76	April 3, 1996	1–3	@ Winnipeg Jets (1995–96)	24–39–13	L
77	April 5, 1996	3–3 OT	Chicago Blackhawks (1995–96)	24–39–14	T
78	April 7, 1996	1–4	Colorado Avalanche (1995–96)	24–40–14	L
79	April 9, 1996	4–3 OT	@ Calgary Flames (1995–96)	25–40–14	W
80	April 10, 1996	4–2	@ Edmonton Oilers (1995–96)	26–40–14	W
81	April 12, 1996	3–5	@ Mighty Ducks of Anaheim (1995–96)	26–41–14	L
82	April 14, 1996	1–5	Detroit Red Wings (1995–96)	26–42–14	L

Legend: W Win (2 points) L Loss (0 points) T Tie (1 point)

== Player statistics ==
=== Scoring ===
- Position abbreviations: C = Center; D = Defense; G = Goaltender; LW = Left wing; RW = Right wing
- † = Joined team via a transaction (e.g., trade, waivers, signing) during the season. Stats reflect time with the Stars only.
- ‡ = Left team via a transaction (e.g., trade, waivers, release) during the season. Stats reflect time with the Stars only.

No.	Player	Pos	Regular season					
No.	Player	Pos	GP	G	A	Pts	+/-	PIM
9	Mike Modano	C	78	36	45	81	−12	63
23	Greg Adams	LW	66	22	21	43	−21	33
41	Brent Gilchrist	LW	77	20	22	42	−11	36
4	Kevin Hatcher	D	74	15	26	41	−24	58
25	Joe Nieuwendyk†	C	52	14	18	32	−17	41
2	Derian Hatcher	D	79	8	23	31	−12	129
10	Todd Harvey	RW	69	9	20	29	−13	136
29	Grant Marshall	RW	70	9	19	28	0	111
26	Jere Lehtinen	RW	57	6	22	28	5	16
15	Dave Gagner‡	C	45	14	13	27	−17	44
33	Benoit Hogue†	C	34	7	20	27	4	36
39	Mike Kennedy	C	61	9	17	26	−7	48
12	Grant Ledyard	D	73	5	19	24	−15	20
21	Guy Carbonneau	C	71	8	15	23	−2	38
24	Richard Matvichuk	D	73	6	16	22	4	71
20	Brent Fedyk†	LW	41	10	9	19	−17	30
17	Bill Huard	LW	51	6	6	12	3	176
22	Trent Klatt‡	RW	22	4	4	8	0	23
6	Darryl Sydor†	D	26	2	6	8	−1	41
27	Shane Churla‡	RW	34	3	4	7	4	168
6	Corey Millen‡	C	13	3	4	7	0	8
11	Mike Donnelly	LW	24	2	5	7	−2	10
5	Doug Zmolek‡	D	42	1	5	6	1	65
44	Randy Wood†	LW	30	1	4	5	−11	26
16	Jamie Langenbrunner	RW	12	2	2	4	−2	6
20	Nikolai Borschevsky‡	RW	12	1	3	4	−7	6
18	Mike Lalor	D	63	1	2	3	−10	31
3	Craig Ludwig	D	65	1	2	3	−17	70
43	Jim Storm	LW	10	1	2	3	−1	17
22	Robert Petrovicky†	C	5	1	1	2	1	0
28	Bob Bassen	C	13	0	1	1	−6	15
38	Mark Lawrence	RW	13	0	1	1	0	17
45	Allan Bester†	G	10	0	0	0		2
37	Zac Boyer	RW	2	0	0	0	0	0
14	Paul Cavallini‡	D	8	0	0	0	−3	6
40	Patrick Cote	LW	2	0	0	0	−2	5
30	Manny Fernandez	G	5	0	0	0		0
25	Dan Kesa‡	RW	3	0	0	0	−1	0
40	Pat MacLeod	D	2	0	0	0	0	0
14	Daniel Marois	RW	3	0	0	0	0	2
35	Andy Moog	G	41	0	0	0		28
32	Travis Richards	D	1	0	0	0	−1	2
34	Darcy Wakaluk	G	37	0	0	0		6
31	Jordan Willis	G	1	0	0	0		0

=== Goaltending ===
- † = Joined team via a transaction (e.g., trade, waivers, signing) during the season. Stats reflect time with the Stars only.

No.	Player	Regular season									
No.	Player	GP	W	L	T	SA	GA	GAA	SV%	SO	TOI
35	Andy Moog	41	13	19	7	1106	111	2.99	.900	1	2228
34	Darcy Wakaluk	37	9	16	5	975	106	3.39	.891	1	1875
45	Allan Bester†	10	4	5	1	297	30	2.99	.899	0	601
30	Manny Fernandez	5	0	1	1	121	19	4.58	.843	0	249
31	Jordan Willis	1	0	1	0	14	1	3.20	.929	0	19

== Awards and records ==
=== Awards ===
Type	Award/honor	Recipient	Ref
League (in-season)	NHL All-Star Game selection	Kevin Hatcher	
League (in-season)	NHL Rookie of the Month	Jere Lehtinen (February)	
Team	Star of the Game Award	Mike Modano	

=== Milestones ===
Milestone	Player	Date	Ref
First game	Jere Lehtinen	October 7, 1995	
First game	Jordan Willis	January 17, 1996	
First game	Patrick Cote	April 12, 1996	
1,000th game played	Guy Carbonneau	February 6, 1996	
1,000th game played	Craig Ludwig	March 2, 1996	

== Draft picks ==
Dallas's draft picks at the 1995 NHL entry draft held at the Edmonton Coliseum in Edmonton, Alberta.

Round	#	Player	Nationality	College/Junior/Club team (League)
1	11	Jarome Iginla	Canada	Kamloops Blazers (WHL)
2	37	Patrick Cote	Canada	Beauport Harfangs (QMJHL)
3	63	Petr Buzek	Czech Republic	Dukla Jihlava (Czech Republic)
3	69	Sergei Gusev	Russia	Mayak Samara (Russia)
5	115	Wade Strand	Canada	Regina Pats (WHL)
6	141	Dominic Marleau	Canada	Victoriaville Tigres (QMJHL)
7	173	Jeff Dewar	Canada	Moose Jaw Warriors (WHL)
8	193	Anatoli Koveshnikov	Ukraine	Sokil Kyiv (Ukraine)
8	202	Sergei Luchinkin	Russia	Dynamo Moscow (Russia)
9	219	Steve Lowe	Canada	Sault Ste. Marie Greyhounds (OHL)
