= 1995–96 Chicago Blackhawks season =

National Hockey League team season

1995–96 Chicago Blackhawks
- Division: 2nd Central
- Conference: 3rd Western
- 1995–96 record: 40–28–14
- Home record: 22–13–6
- Road record: 18–15–8
- Goals for: 273
- Goals against: 220

Team information
- General manager: Bob Pulford
- Coach: Craig Hartsburg
- Captain: Chris Chelios
- Arena: United Center
- Average attendance: 20,390
- Minor league affiliates: Indianapolis Ice; Columbus Chill

Team leaders
- Goals: Jeremy Roenick (32)
- Assists: Chris Chelios (58)
- Points: Chris Chelios (72)
- Penalty minutes: Bob Probert (237)
- Plus/minus: Keith Carney (+31)
- Wins: Ed Belfour (22)
- Goals against average: Jeff Hackett (2.40)

The 1995–96 Chicago Blackhawks season was the 70th season of operation of the Chicago Blackhawks in the National Hockey League (NHL).

== Offseason ==
Captain Dirk Graham retired. Defenseman Chris Chelios was named the new captain.

== Regular season ==
The Blackhawks had the fewest power-play opportunities during the Regular season, with 356.

=== Final standings ===
Central Division
No.		GP	W	L	T	GF	GA	Pts
1	**Detroit Red Wings**	82	62	13	7	325	181	131
2	**Chicago Blackhawks**	82	40	28	14	273	220	94
3	**Toronto Maple Leafs**	82	34	36	12	247	252	80
4	**St. Louis Blues**	82	32	34	16	219	248	80
5	**Winnipeg Jets**	82	36	40	6	275	291	78
6	Dallas Stars	82	26	42	14	227	280	66

Note: GP = Games played; W = Wins; L = Losses; T = Ties; GF = Goals for; GA = Goals against; Pts = Points
Bolded teams qualified for the playoffs.

Western Conference
R		Div	GP	W	L	T	GF	GA	Pts
**1**	**p – Detroit Red Wings**	**CEN**	**82**	**62**	**13**	**7**	**325**	**181**	**131**
**2**	**Colorado Avalanche**	**PAC**	**82**	**47**	**25**	**10**	**326**	**240**	**104**
**3**	**Chicago Blackhawks**	**CEN**	**82**	**40**	**28**	**14**	**273**	**220**	**94**
**4**	**Toronto Maple Leafs**	**CEN**	**82**	**34**	**36**	**12**	**247**	**252**	**80**
**5**	**St. Louis Blues**	**CEN**	**82**	**32**	**34**	**16**	**219**	**248**	**80**
**6**	**Calgary Flames**	**PAC**	**82**	**34**	**37**	**11**	**241**	**240**	**79**
**7**	**Vancouver Canucks**	**PAC**	**82**	**32**	**35**	**15**	**278**	**278**	**79**
**8**	**Winnipeg Jets**	**CEN**	**82**	**36**	**40**	**6**	**275**	**291**	**78**
9	Mighty Ducks of Anaheim	PAC	82	35	39	8	234	247	78
10	Edmonton Oilers	PAC	82	30	44	8	240	304	68
11	Dallas Stars	CEN	82	26	42	14	227	280	66
12	Los Angeles Kings	PAC	82	24	40	18	256	302	66
13	San Jose Sharks	PAC	82	20	55	7	252	357	47

Divisions: CEN – Central, PAC – Pacific

bold – Qualified for playoffs; p – Won Presidents' Trophy

== Schedule and results ==
=== Regular season ===
1995–96 regular season
October: 6–5–1 (home: 3–2–1; road: 3–3–0)

Game	Date	Score	Opponent	Record	Recap
1	October 7, 1995	4–3	@ San Jose Sharks (1995–96)	1–0–0	W
2	October 10, 1995	5–6 OT	@ Los Angeles Kings (1995–96)	1–1–0	L
3	October 12, 1995	5–1	Pittsburgh Penguins (1995–96)	2–1–0	W
4	October 14, 1995	2–3	@ Hartford Whalers (1995–96)	2–2–0	L
5	October 15, 1995	1–1 OT	Calgary Flames (1995–96)	2–2–1	T
6	October 17, 1995	6–3	@ Florida Panthers (1995–96)	3–2–1	W
7	October 19, 1995	1–4	Tampa Bay Lightning (1995–96)	3–3–1	L
8	October 21, 1995	4–1	@ St. Louis Blues (1995–96)	4–3–1	W
9	October 22, 1995	5–4	Philadelphia Flyers (1995–96)	5–3–1	W
10	October 26, 1995	1–2	Toronto Maple Leafs (1995–96)	5–4–1	L
11	October 28, 1995	3–5	@ Montreal Canadiens (1995–96)	5–5–1	L
12	October 29, 1995	6–3	Buffalo Sabres (1995–96)	6–5–1	W

November: 5–4–4 (home: 2–2–1; road: 3–2–3)

Game	Date	Score	Opponent	Record	Recap
13	November 1, 1995	1–1 OT	@ Dallas Stars (1995–96)	6–5–2	T
14	November 5, 1995	3–7	Colorado Avalanche (1995–96)	6–6–2	L
15	November 9, 1995	5–2	Vancouver Canucks (1995–96)	7–6–2	W
16	November 11, 1995	4–1	@ Washington Capitals (1995–96)	8–6–2	W
17	November 12, 1995	4–4 OT	Edmonton Oilers (1995–96)	8–6–3	T
18	November 14, 1995	5–6 OT	@ Winnipeg Jets (1995–96)	8–7–3	L
19	November 16, 1995	3–1	New York Rangers (1995–96)	9–7–3	W
20	November 19, 1995	2–3	San Jose Sharks (1995–96)	9–8–3	L
21	November 22, 1995	2–6	@ Colorado Avalanche (1995–96)	9–9–3	L
22	November 24, 1995	5–4 OT	@ Mighty Ducks of Anaheim (1995–96)	10–9–3	W
23	November 26, 1995	2–2 OT	@ Calgary Flames (1995–96)	10–9–4	T
24	November 28, 1995	5–3	@ Edmonton Oilers (1995–96)	11–9–4	W
25	November 29, 1995	2–2 OT	@ Vancouver Canucks (1995–96)	11–9–5	T

December: 8–3–3 (home: 5–2–1; road: 3–1–2)

Game	Date	Score	Opponent	Record	Recap
26	December 2, 1995	2–2 OT	@ Winnipeg Jets (1995–96)	11–9–6	T
27	December 6, 1995	5–5 OT	@ New York Rangers (1995–96)	11–9–7	T
28	December 7, 1995	2–5	Ottawa Senators (1995–96)	11–10–7	L
29	December 10, 1995	4–1	Hartford Whalers (1995–96)	12–10–7	W
30	December 13, 1995	1–3	@ Detroit Red Wings (1995–96)	12–11–7	L
31	December 15, 1995	1–4	Montreal Canadiens (1995–96)	12–12–7	L
32	December 17, 1995	3–1	Winnipeg Jets (1995–96)	13–12–7	W
33	December 20, 1995	4–2	@ Toronto Maple Leafs (1995–96)	14–12–7	W
34	December 21, 1995	3–3 OT	Toronto Maple Leafs (1995–96)	14–12–8	T
35	December 23, 1995	2–0	@ Dallas Stars (1995–96)	15–12–8	W
36	December 26, 1995	5–3	Dallas Stars (1995–96)	16–12–8	W
37	December 28, 1995	4–3	Winnipeg Jets (1995–96)	17–12–8	W
38	December 29, 1995	5–2	@ Buffalo Sabres (1995–96)	18–12–8	W
39	December 31, 1995	5–0	New Jersey Devils (1995–96)	19–12–8	W

January: 7–3–3 (home: 4–2–1; road: 3–1–2)

Game	Date	Score	Opponent	Record	Recap
40	January 2, 1996	5–2	@ Boston Bruins (1995–96)	20–12–8	W
41	January 4, 1996	1–3	St. Louis Blues (1995–96)	20–13–8	L
42	January 6, 1996	0–3	@ Detroit Red Wings (1995–96)	20–14–8	L
43	January 7, 1996	5–2	Dallas Stars (1995–96)	21–14–8	W
44	January 9, 1996	3–3 OT	@ New York Islanders (1995–96)	21–14–9	T
45	January 12, 1996	3–0	Mighty Ducks of Anaheim (1995–96)	22–14–9	W
46	January 14, 1996	5–2	Los Angeles Kings (1995–96)	23–14–9	W
47	January 17, 1996	2–3	Washington Capitals (1995–96)	23–15–9	L
48	January 22, 1996	7–3	@ Ottawa Senators (1995–96)	24–15–9	W
49	January 24, 1996	2–2 OT	@ Toronto Maple Leafs (1995–96)	24–15–10	T
50	January 25, 1996	2–1	San Jose Sharks (1995–96)	25–15–10	W
51	January 27, 1996	5–5 OT	Detroit Red Wings (1995–96)	25–15–11	T
52	January 31, 1996	4–0	@ Edmonton Oilers (1995–96)	26–15–11	W

February: 7–4–0 (home: 3–1–0; road: 4–3–0)

Game	Date	Score	Opponent	Record	Recap
53	February 3, 1996	4–1	@ San Jose Sharks (1995–96)	27–15–11	W
54	February 4, 1996	4–1	@ Mighty Ducks of Anaheim (1995–96)	28–15–11	W
55	February 6, 1996	5–2	@ Los Angeles Kings (1995–96)	29–15–11	W
56	February 8, 1996	6–1	@ St. Louis Blues (1995–96)	30–15–11	W
57	February 10, 1996	3–6	@ Pittsburgh Penguins (1995–96)	30–16–11	L
58	February 15, 1996	3–0	Boston Bruins (1995–96)	31–16–11	W
59	February 18, 1996	4–1	Edmonton Oilers (1995–96)	32–16–11	W
60	February 22, 1996	3–4 OT	St. Louis Blues (1995–96)	32–17–11	L
61	February 23, 1996	0–1 OT	@ Winnipeg Jets (1995–96)	32–18–11	L
62	February 25, 1996	2–3	@ Philadelphia Flyers (1995–96)	32–19–11	L
63	February 29, 1996	4–3	Colorado Avalanche (1995–96)	33–19–11	W

March: 5–7–1 (home: 4–3–1; road: 1–4–0)

Game	Date	Score	Opponent	Record	Recap
64	March 1, 1996	3–5	@ Colorado Avalanche (1995–96)	33–20–11	L
65	March 3, 1996	2–6	Detroit Red Wings (1995–96)	33–21–11	L
66	March 5, 1996	0–2	@ Tampa Bay Lightning (1995–96)	33–22–11	L
67	March 8, 1996	2–4	Los Angeles Kings (1995–96)	33–23–11	L
68	March 11, 1996	8–4	Florida Panthers (1995–96)	34–23–11	W
69	March 14, 1996	5–1	Vancouver Canucks (1995–96)	35–23–11	W
70	March 17, 1996	5–1	New York Islanders (1995–96)	36–23–11	W
71	March 20, 1996	2–3	Calgary Flames (1995–96)	36–24–11	L
72	March 22, 1996	4–2	@ New Jersey Devils (1995–96)	37–24–11	W
73	March 24, 1996	2–2 OT	Mighty Ducks of Anaheim (1995–96)	37–24–12	T
74	March 27, 1996	0–1	@ Calgary Flames (1995–96)	37–25–12	L
75	March 29, 1996	2–4	@ Vancouver Canucks (1995–96)	37–26–12	L
76	March 31, 1996	5–3	Dallas Stars (1995–96)	38–26–12	W

April: 2–2–2 (home: 1–1–1; road: 1–1–1)

Game	Date	Score	Opponent	Record	Recap
77	April 3, 1996	5–2	@ Toronto Maple Leafs (1995–96)	39–26–12	W
78	April 5, 1996	3–3 OT	@ Dallas Stars (1995–96)	39–26–13	T
79	April 7, 1996	1–4	Detroit Red Wings (1995–96)	39–27–13	L
80	April 11, 1996	5–2	Toronto Maple Leafs (1995–96)	40–27–13	W
81	April 12, 1996	3–5	@ Detroit Red Wings (1995–96)	40–28–13	L
82	April 14, 1996	2–2 OT	St. Louis Blues (1995–96)	40–28–14	T

Legend: W Win (2 points) L Loss (0 points) T Tie (1 point)

=== Playoffs ===
1996 Stanley Cup playoffs
Western Conference Quarterfinals vs. (6) Calgary Flames – Blackhawks win 4–0

Game	Date	Score	Opponent	Series	Recap
1	April 17, 1996	4–1	Calgary Flames	Blackhawks lead 1–0	W
2	April 19, 1996	3–0	Calgary Flames	Blackhawks lead 2–0	W
3	April 21, 1996	7–5	@ Calgary Flames	Blackhawks lead 3–0	W
4	April 23, 1996	2–1 3OT	@ Calgary Flames	Blackhawks win 4–0	W

Western Conference Semifinals vs. (2) Colorado Avalanche – Avalanche win 4–2

Game	Date	Score	Opponent	Series	Recap
1	May 2, 1996	3–2	@ Colorado Avalanche	Blackhawks lead 1–0	W
2	May 4, 1996	1–5	@ Colorado Avalanche	Series tied 1–1	L
3	May 6, 1996	4–3 OT	Colorado Avalanche	Blackhawks lead 2–1	W
4	May 8, 1996	2–3 3OT	Colorado Avalanche	Series tied 2–2	L
5	May 11, 1996	1–4	@ Colorado Avalanche	Avalanche lead 3–2	L
6	May 13, 1996	3–4 2OT	Colorado Avalanche	Avalanche win 4–2	L

Legend: W Win L Loss

== Player statistics ==
=== Scoring ===
- Position abbreviations: C = Center; D = Defense; G = Goaltender; LW = Left wing; RW = Right wing
- † = Joined team via a transaction (e.g., trade, waivers, signing) during the season. Stats reflect time with the Blackhawks only.
- ‡ = Left team via a transaction (e.g., trade, waivers, release) during the season. Stats reflect time with the Blackhawks only.

No.	Player	Pos	Regular season						Playoffs					
No.	Player	Pos	GP	G	A	Pts	+/-	PIM	GP	G	A	Pts	+/-	PIM
7	Chris Chelios	D	81	14	58	72	25	140	9	0	3	3	2	8
27	Jeremy Roenick	LW	66	32	35	67	9	109	10	5	7	12	6	2
20	Gary Suter	D	82	20	47	67	3	80	10	3	3	6	1	8
10	Tony Amonte	RW	81	31	32	63	10	62	7	2	4	6	2	6
92	Bernie Nicholls	C	59	19	41	60	11	60	10	2	7	9	3	4
55	Eric Daze	LW	80	30	23	53	16	18	10	3	5	8	4	0
17	Joe Murphy	RW	70	22	29	51	−3	86	10	6	2	8	1	33
18	Denis Savard	C	69	13	35	48	20	102	10	1	2	3	0	8
32	Murray Craven	LW	66	18	29	47	20	36	9	1	4	5	−1	2
24	Bob Probert	RW	78	19	21	40	15	237	10	0	2	2	−1	23
12	Brent Sutter	C	80	13	27	40	14	56	10	1	1	2	−3	6
11	Jeff Shantz	C	78	6	14	20	12	24	10	2	3	5	−2	6
4	Keith Carney	D	82	5	14	19	31	94	10	0	3	3	−1	4
25	Sergei Krivokrasov	LW	46	6	10	16	10	32	5	1	0	1	−4	2
44	Patrick Poulin‡	LW	38	7	8	15	7	16	—	—	—	—	—	—
2	Eric Weinrich	D	77	5	10	15	14	65	10	1	4	5	2	10
6 (Note: Ulanov wore number 45 through December 10. He first wore number 6 on December 6.)	Igor Ulanov†‡	D	53	1	8	9	12	92	—	—	—	—	—	—
5	Steve Smith	D	37	0	9	9	12	71	6	0	0	0	−2	16
38 (Note: Black wore number 34 in his first game.)	James Black	C	13	3	3	6	1	16	8	1	0	1	−1	2
15	Jim Cummins	RW	52	2	4	6	−1	180	10	0	0	0	−1	2
19	Brent Grieve	LW	28	2	4	6	5	28	—	—	—	—	—	—
22	Steve Dubinsky	C	43	2	3	5	3	14	—	—	—	—	—	—
14	Kip Miller	C	10	1	4	5	1	2	—	—	—	—	—	—
8	Cam Russell	D	61	2	2	4	8	129	6	0	0	0	−1	2
30	Ed Belfour	G	50	0	2	2		36	9	0	0	0		4
39	Enrico Ciccone†	D	11	0	1	1	5	48	9	1	0	1	−1	30
31	Jeff Hackett	G	35	0	1	1		8	1	0	0	0		0
40 (Note: Moreau wore number 23 in his first game.)	Ethan Moreau	LW	8	0	1	1	1	4	—	—	—	—	—	—
19	Danton Cole†	RW	2	0	0	0	0	0	—	—	—	—	—	—
6 (Note: Droppa wore number 3 on April 12.)	Ivan Droppa	D	7	0	0	0	2	2	—	—	—	—	—	—
23	Mike Prokopec	RW	9	0	0	0	−4	5	—	—	—	—	—	—
29	Jimmy Waite	G	1	0	0	0		0	—	—	—	—	—	—
3	Brad Werenka	D	9	0	0	0	−2	8	—	—	—	—	—	—

=== Goaltending ===
No.	Player	Regular season										Playoffs								
No.	Player	GP	W	L	T	SA	GA	GAA	SV%	SO	TOI	GP	W	L	SA	GA	GAA	SV%	SO	TOI
30	Ed Belfour	50	22	17	10	1373	135	2.74	.902	1	2956	9	6	3	323	23	2.07	.929	1	666
31	Jeff Hackett	35	18	11	4	948	80	2.40	.916	4	2000	1	0	1	32	5	5.00	.844	0	60
29	Jimmy Waite	1	0	0	0	8	0	0.00	1.000	0	31	—	—	—	—	—	—	—	—	—

== Awards and records ==
=== Awards ===
Type	Award/honor	Recipient	Ref
League (annual)	James Norris Memorial Trophy	Chris Chelios	
League (annual)	NHL All-Rookie Team	Eric Daze (Forward)	
League (annual)	NHL First All-Star team	Chris Chelios (Defense)	
League (in-season)	NHL All-Star Game selection	Ed Belfour (Note: Belfour and Chelios were voted to the starting lineup.)	
League (in-season)	NHL All-Star Game selection	Chris Chelios	
League (in-season)	NHL All-Star Game selection	Denis Savard (Note: Savard was selected by the commissioner.)	
League (in-season)	NHL All-Star Game selection	Gary Suter (Note: Suter did not play and was replaced by Larry Murphy of the Toronto Maple Leafs.)	
League (in-season)	NHL Rookie of the Month	Eric Daze (January)	

=== Milestones ===
Milestone	Player	Date	Ref
First game	Ethan Moreau	November 11, 1995	
First game	Mike Prokopec	December 10, 1995	
1,000th game played	Brent Sutter	February 23, 1996	

== Draft picks ==
Chicago's draft picks at the 1995 NHL entry draft held at the Edmonton Coliseum in Edmonton, Alberta.

Round	#	Player	Nationality	College/Junior/Club team (League)
1	19	Dmitri Nabokov	Russia	Krylya Sovetov (Russia)
2	45	Christian Laflamme	Canada	Beauport Harfangs (QMJHL)
3	71	Kevin McKay	Canada	Moose Jaw Warriors (WHL)
4	82	Chris Van Dyk	Canada	Windsor Spitfires (OHL)
4	97	Pavel Kriz	Czech Republic	Tri-City Americans (WHL)
6	146	Marc Magliarditi	United States	Des Moines Buccaneers (USHL)
6	149	Marty Wilford	Canada	Oshawa Generals (OHL)
7	175	Steve Tardif	Canada	Drummondville Voltigeurs (QMJHL)
8	201	Casey Hankinson	United States	University of Minnesota (WCHA)
9	227	Michael Pittman	Canada	Guelph Storm (OHL)

== See also ==
- 1995–96 NHL season
