= 1995–96 Buffalo Sabres season =

NHL hockey team season

1995–96 Buffalo Sabres
- Division: 5th Northeast
- Conference: 11th Eastern
- 1995–96 record: 33–42–7
- Home record: 19–17–5
- Road record: 14–25–2
- Goals for: 247
- Goals against: 262

Team information
- General manager: John Muckler
- Coach: Ted Nolan
- Captain: Pat LaFontaine
- Arena: Buffalo Memorial Auditorium
- Average attendance: 13,378
- Minor league affiliates: Rochester Americans; South Carolina Stingrays

Team leaders
- Goals: Pat LaFontaine (40)
- Assists: Pat LaFontaine (51)
- Points: Pat LaFontaine (91)
- Penalty minutes: Matthew Barnaby (335)
- Plus/minus: Mike Wilson (+13)
- Wins: Dominik Hasek (22)
- Goals against average: Dominik Hasek (2.83)

The 1995–96 Buffalo Sabres season was the Sabres' 26th season in the National Hockey League (NHL). This was the team's final season at Buffalo Memorial Auditorium, their home arena since 1970. They moved to Marine Midland Arena, which is now known as KeyBank Center. However, the Sabres failed to qualify for the playoffs for the first time since 1987.

== Regular season ==
The Sabres had the most power-play opportunities during the regular season with 477.

=== Season standings ===
Northeast Division
No.		GP	W	L	T	GF	GA	PTS
1	**Pittsburgh Penguins**	82	49	29	4	362	284	102
2	**Boston Bruins**	82	40	31	11	282	269	91
3	**Montreal Canadiens**	82	40	32	10	265	248	90
4	Hartford Whalers	82	34	39	9	237	259	77
5	Buffalo Sabres	82	33	42	7	247	262	72
6	Ottawa Senators	82	18	59	5	191	291	41

Eastern Conference
R		Div	GP	W	L	T	GF	GA	Pts
**1**	**Philadelphia Flyers**	**ATL**	**82**	**45**	**24**	**13**	**282**	**208**	**103**
**2**	**Pittsburgh Penguins**	**NE**	**82**	**49**	**29**	**4**	**362**	**284**	**102**
**3**	**New York Rangers**	**ATL**	**82**	**41**	**27**	**14**	**272**	**237**	**96**
**4**	**Florida Panthers**	**ATL**	**82**	**41**	**31**	**10**	**254**	**234**	**92**
**5**	**Boston Bruins**	**NE**	**82**	**40**	**31**	**11**	**282**	**269**	**91**
**6**	**Montreal Canadiens**	**NE**	**82**	**40**	**32**	**10**	**265**	**248**	**90**
**7**	**Washington Capitals**	**ATL**	**82**	**39**	**32**	**11**	**234**	**204**	**89**
**8**	**Tampa Bay Lightning**	**ATL**	**82**	**38**	**32**	**12**	**238**	**248**	**88**
9	New Jersey Devils	ATL	82	37	33	12	215	202	86
10	Hartford Whalers	NE	82	34	39	9	237	259	77
11	Buffalo Sabres	NE	82	33	42	7	247	262	73
12	New York Islanders	ATL	82	22	50	10	229	315	54
13	Ottawa Senators	NE	82	18	59	5	191	291	41

Divisions: ATL – Atlantic, NE – Northeast

bold – Qualified for playoffs

== Schedule and results ==
1995–96 regular season
October: 3–7–0 (home: 2–3–0; road: 1–4–0)

Game	Date	Score	Opponent	Record	Recap
1	October 7, 1995	3–1	@ Ottawa Senators (1995–96)	1–0–0	W
2	October 9, 1995	3–5	@ Boston Bruins (1995–96)	1–1–0	L
3	October 13, 1995	1–4	Mighty Ducks of Anaheim (1995–96)	1–2–0	L
4	October 15, 1995	3–4	New Jersey Devils (1995–96)	1–3–0	L
5	October 18, 1995	4–1	Edmonton Oilers (1995–96)	2–3–0	W
6	October 20, 1995	1–3	New York Rangers (1995–96)	2–4–0	L
7	October 22, 1995	5–2	St. Louis Blues (1995–96)	3–4–0	W
8	October 24, 1995	0–3	@ Dallas Stars (1995–96)	3–5–0	L
9	October 27, 1995	4–5	@ Colorado Avalanche (1995–96)	3–6–0	L
10	October 29, 1995	3–6	@ Chicago Blackhawks (1995–96)	3–7–0	L

November: 7–4–2 (home: 4–1–2; road: 3–3–0)

Game	Date	Score	Opponent	Record	Recap
11	November 1, 1995	2–1	Detroit Red Wings (1995–96)	4–7–0	W
12	November 3, 1995	3–3 OT	Pittsburgh Penguins (1995–96)	4–7–1	T
13	November 5, 1995	3–4	Winnipeg Jets (1995–96)	4–8–1	L
14	November 8, 1995	7–2	San Jose Sharks (1995–96)	5–8–1	W
15	November 11, 1995	1–4	@ Florida Panthers (1995–96)	5–9–1	L
16	November 12, 1995	6–4	@ Tampa Bay Lightning (1995–96)	6–9–1	W
17	November 15, 1995	2–1	Dallas Stars (1995–96)	7–9–1	W
18	November 18, 1995	5–4	@ New Jersey Devils (1995–96)	8–9–1	W
19	November 19, 1995	6–0	Ottawa Senators (1995–96)	9–9–1	W
20	November 24, 1995	1–1 OT	New York Islanders (1995–96)	9–9–2	T
21	November 25, 1995	3–5	@ Pittsburgh Penguins (1995–96)	9–10–2	L
22	November 27, 1995	2–0	@ St. Louis Blues (1995–96)	10–10–2	W
23	November 29, 1995	3–5	@ New York Rangers (1995–96)	10–11–2	L

December: 6–8–1 (home: 4–5–1; road: 2–3–0)

Game	Date	Score	Opponent	Record	Recap
24	December 1, 1995	2–1	Hartford Whalers (1995–96)	11–11–2	W
25	December 2, 1995	4–6	@ Boston Bruins (1995–96)	11–12–2	L
26	December 7, 1995	3–7	@ Philadelphia Flyers (1995–96)	11–13–2	L
27	December 8, 1995	2–2 OT	Washington Capitals (1995–96)	11–13–3	T
28	December 11, 1995	1–6	Tampa Bay Lightning (1995–96)	11–14–3	L
29	December 13, 1995	4–3	Colorado Avalanche (1995–96)	12–14–3	W
30	December 15, 1995	5–4	New York Rangers (1995–96)	13–14–3	W
31	December 16, 1995	3–2	@ New Jersey Devils (1995–96)	14–14–3	W
32	December 20, 1995	2–1	Montreal Canadiens (1995–96)	15–14–3	W
33	December 22, 1995	2–3 OT	Boston Bruins (1995–96)	15–15–3	L
34	December 23, 1995	4–2	@ Ottawa Senators (1995–96)	16–15–3	W
35	December 26, 1995	3–6	@ Pittsburgh Penguins (1995–96)	16–16–3	L
36	December 27, 1995	3–4	Ottawa Senators (1995–96)	16–17–3	L
37	December 29, 1995	2–5	Chicago Blackhawks (1995–96)	16–18–3	L
38	December 31, 1995	2–5	New York Islanders (1995–96)	16–19–3	L

January: 4–7–0 (home: 3–1–0; road: 1–6–0)

Game	Date	Score	Opponent	Record	Recap
39	January 5, 1996	3–1	Toronto Maple Leafs (1995–96)	17–19–3	W
40	January 6, 1996	7–6	@ Montreal Canadiens (1995–96)	18–19–3	W
41	January 10, 1996	1–4	@ Winnipeg Jets (1995–96)	18–20–3	L
42	January 12, 1996	1–3	@ Calgary Flames (1995–96)	18–21–3	L
43	January 13, 1996	4–5 OT	@ Edmonton Oilers (1995–96)	18–22–3	L
44	January 17, 1996	0–1	Pittsburgh Penguins (1995–96)	18–23–3	L
45	January 24, 1996	4–2	Hartford Whalers (1995–96)	19–23–3	W
46	January 26, 1996	0–1	@ Washington Capitals (1995–96)	19–24–3	L
47	January 27, 1996	3–6	@ Florida Panthers (1995–96)	19–25–3	L
48	January 30, 1996	4–5 OT	@ New York Islanders (1995–96)	19–26–3	L
49	January 31, 1996	6–1	Florida Panthers (1995–96)	20–26–3	W

February: 6–3–3 (home: 4–1–2; road: 2–2–1)

Game	Date	Score	Opponent	Record	Recap
50	February 3, 1996	2–4	@ Boston Bruins (1995–96)	20–27–3	L
51	February 4, 1996	2–5	Tampa Bay Lightning (1995–96)	20–28–3	L
52	February 7, 1996	2–1 OT	Boston Bruins (1995–96)	21–28–3	W
53	February 8, 1996	2–1	@ Philadelphia Flyers (1995–96)	22–28–3	W
54	February 10, 1996	2–2 OT	@ Toronto Maple Leafs (1995–96)	22–28–4	T
55	February 14, 1996	2–2 OT	Los Angeles Kings (1995–96)	22–28–5	T
56	February 16, 1996	2–2 OT	New Jersey Devils (1995–96)	22–28–6	T
57	February 17, 1996	1–2 OT	@ Hartford Whalers (1995–96)	22–29–6	L
58	February 21, 1996	6–3	Pittsburgh Penguins (1995–96)	23–29–6	W
59	February 23, 1996	7–2	Philadelphia Flyers (1995–96)	24–29–6	W
60	February 25, 1996	6–1	Florida Panthers (1995–96)	25–29–6	W
61	February 28, 1996	3–2 OT	@ Ottawa Senators (1995–96)	26–29–6	W

March: 2–11–1 (home: 0–5–0; road: 2–6–1)

Game	Date	Score	Opponent	Record	Recap
62	March 1, 1996	3–3 OT	@ New York Rangers (1995–96)	26–29–7	T
63	March 3, 1996	0–3	Vancouver Canucks (1995–96)	26–30–7	L
64	March 6, 1996	2–5	@ Vancouver Canucks (1995–96)	26–31–7	L
65	March 8, 1996	2–3 OT	@ Mighty Ducks of Anaheim (1995–96)	26–32–7	L
66	March 10, 1996	4–6	@ San Jose Sharks (1995–96)	26–33–7	L
67	March 13, 1996	6–2	@ Los Angeles Kings (1995–96)	27–33–7	W
68	March 15, 1996	1–3	Calgary Flames (1995–96)	27–34–7	L
69	March 16, 1996	1–2	@ Hartford Whalers (1995–96)	27–35–7	L
70	March 18, 1996	2–3	@ Montreal Canadiens (1995–96)	27–36–7	L
71	March 22, 1996	1–4	Montreal Canadiens (1995–96)	27–37–7	L
72	March 23, 1996	7–5	@ Pittsburgh Penguins (1995–96)	28–37–7	W
73	March 27, 1996	2–4	@ Detroit Red Wings (1995–96)	28–38–7	L
74	March 29, 1996	5–6 OT	Philadelphia Flyers (1995–96)	28–39–7	L
75	March 31, 1996	5–6	Boston Bruins (1995–96)	28–40–7	L

April: 5–2–0 (home: 2–1–0; road: 3–1–0)

Game	Date	Score	Opponent	Record	Recap
76	April 1, 1996	6–4	@ Montreal Canadiens (1995–96)	29–40–7	W
77	April 3, 1996	1–5	Washington Capitals (1995–96)	29–41–7	L
78	April 5, 1996	4–3	@ Tampa Bay Lightning (1995–96)	30–41–7	W
79	April 6, 1996	0–3	@ New York Islanders (1995–96)	30–42–7	L
80	April 10, 1996	5–2	Ottawa Senators (1995–96)	31–42–7	W
81	April 13, 1996	3–2	@ Washington Capitals (1995–96)	32–42–7	W
82	April 14, 1996	4–1	Hartford Whalers (1995–96)	33–42–7	W

Legend: W Win (2 points) L Loss (0 points) T Tie (1 point)

== Player statistics ==
=== Scoring ===
- Position abbreviations: C = Center; D = Defense; G = Goaltender; LW = Left wing; RW = Right wing
- † = Joined team via a transaction (e.g., trade, waivers, signing) during the season. Stats reflect time with the Sabres only.
- ‡ = Left team via a transaction (e.g., trade, waivers, release) during the season. Stats reflect time with the Sabres only.

No.	Player	Pos	Regular season					
No.	Player	Pos	GP	G	A	Pts	+/-	PIM
16	Pat LaFontaine	C	76	40	51	91	−8	36
12	Randy Burridge	LW	74	25	33	58	0	30
26	Derek Plante	C	76	23	33	56	−4	28
3	Garry Galley	D	78	10	44	54	−2	81
43	Jason Dawe	RW	67	25	25	50	−8	33
10	Brad May	LW	79	15	29	44	6	295
44	Alexei Zhitnik	D	80	6	30	36	−25	58
36	Matthew Barnaby	RW	73	15	16	31	−2	335
27	Michael Peca	C	68	11	20	31	−1	67
13	Yuri Khmylev‡	LW	66	8	20	28	−12	40
28	Donald Audette	RW	23	12	13	25	0	18
19	Brian Holzinger	C	58	10	10	20	−21	37
21	Mark Astley	D	60	2	18	20	−12	80
41	Dave Hannan‡	C	57	6	10	16	2	30
17	Brent Hughes	LW	76	5	10	15	−9	148
34	Mike Wilson	D	58	4	8	12	13	41
18	Michal Grosek†	LW	22	6	4	10	0	31
22	Charlie Huddy‡	D	52	5	5	10	−5	59
24	Dane Jackson	RW	22	5	4	9	3	41
32	Rob Ray	RW	71	3	6	9	−8	287
8 (Note: Shannon wore number 29 in his first two games.)	Darryl Shannon†	D	26	2	6	8	10	20
25	Rob Conn	W	28	2	5	7	−9	18
8	Doug Bodger‡	D	16	0	5	5	−6	18
33	Scott Pearson	LW	27	4	0	4	−4	67
15	Dixon Ward	RW	8	2	2	4	1	6
6	Doug Houda	D	38	1	3	4	3	52
5	Craig Muni‡	D	47	0	4	4	−12	69
4	Bob Boughner†	D	31	0	1	1	3	104
39	Dominik Hasek	G	59	0	1	1		6
38	Jay McKee	D	1	0	1	1	1	2
00	Martin Biron	G	3	0	0	0		0
1	John Blue†	G	5	0	0	0		0
37	Curtis Brown	C	4	0	0	0	0	0
4	Grant Jennings	D	6	0	0	0	1	28
37	Barrie Moore	LW	3	0	0	0	0	0
45	Scott Nichol	C	2	0	0	0	0	10
76	Wayne Primeau	C	2	0	0	0	0	0
31	Steve Shields	G	2	0	0	0		2
30	Andrei Trefilov	G	22	0	0	0		4
9	Vaclav Varada†	RW	1	0	0	0	0	0

=== Goaltending ===
- † = Joined team via a transaction (e.g., trade, waivers, signing) during the season. Stats reflect time with the Sabres only.

No.	Player	Regular season									
No.	Player	GP	W	L	T	SA	GA	GAA	SV%	SO	TOI
39	Dominik Hasek	59	22	30	6	2011	161	2.83	.920	2	3417
30	Andrei Trefilov	22	8	8	1	660	64	3.51	.903	0	1094
1	John Blue†	5	2	2	0	137	15	3.52	.891	0	255
31	Steve Shields	2	1	0	0	32	4	3.19	.875	0	75
00	Martin Biron	3	0	2	0	64	10	5.05	.844	0	119

== Awards and records ==
=== Awards ===
Type	Award/honor	Recipient	Ref
League (in-season)	NHL All-Star Game selection	Dominik Hasek	

=== Milestones ===
Milestone	Player	Date	Ref
First game	Mike Wilson	November 18, 1995	
First game	Steve Shields	December 23, 1995	
First game	Martin Biron	December 26, 1995	
First game	Bob Boughner	February 3, 1996	
First game	Barrie Moore	April 5, 1996	
First game	Jay McKee	April 10, 1996	
First game	Scott Nichol	April 13, 1996	
First game	Vaclav Varada	April 14, 1996	
1,000th game played	Charlie Huddy	March 8, 1996	

== Draft picks ==
Buffalo's draft picks at the 1995 NHL entry draft held at the Edmonton Coliseum in Edmonton, Alberta.

Round	#	Player	Nationality	College/Junior/Club team (League)
1	14	Jay McKee	Canada	Niagara Falls Thunder (OHL)
1	16	Martin Biron	Canada	Beauport Harfangs (QMJHL)
2	42	Mark Dutiaume	Canada	Brandon Wheat Kings (WHL)
3	68	Mathieu Sunderland	Canada	Drummondville Voltigeurs (QMJHL)
4	94	Matt Davidson	Canada	Portland Winter Hawks (WHL)
5	111	Marian Menhart	Czech Republic	HC Litvínov (Czech Republic)
5	119	Kevin Popp	Canada	Seattle Thunderbirds (WHL)
5	123	Daniel Bienvenue	Canada	Val-d'Or Foreurs (QMJHL)
7	172	Brian Scott	Canada	Kitchener Rangers (OHL)
8	198	Mike Zanutto	Canada	Oshawa Generals (OHL)
9	224	Rob Skrlac	Canada	Kamloops Blazers (WHL)

== See also ==
- 1995–96 NHL season
