= 1995–96 Washington Capitals season =

NHL hockey team season

1995–96 Washington Capitals
- Division: 4th Atlantic
- Conference: 7th Eastern
- 1995–96 record: 39–32–11
- Home record: 21–15–5
- Road record: 18–17–6
- Goals for: 234
- Goals against: 204

Team information
- General manager: David Poile
- Coach: Jim Schoenfeld
- Captain: Dale Hunter
- Arena: USAir Arena
- Average attendance: 15,155
- Minor league affiliates: Portland Pirates; Hampton Roads Admirals

Team leaders
- Goals: Peter Bondra (52)
- Assists: Michal Pivonka (65)
- Points: Michal Pivonka (81)
- Penalty minutes: Kevin Kaminski (164)
- Plus/minus: Mark Tinordi (+26)
- Wins: Jim Carey (35)
- Goals against average: Jim Carey (2.26)

The 1995–96 Washington Capitals season was the Capitals' 22nd season of play. The Capitals made the playoffs, but lost their opening round series 4–2 to the Pittsburgh Penguins.

== Off-season ==
The Capitals introduced a new logo and color scheme featuring blue, black and bronze.

== Regular season ==
The Capitals tied the Detroit Red Wings for most shutouts for (9) during the regular season.

=== Final standings ===
Atlantic Division
No.		GP	W	L	T	GF	GA	Pts
1	**Philadelphia Flyers**	82	45	24	13	282	208	103
2	**New York Rangers**	82	41	27	14	272	237	96
3	**Florida Panthers**	82	41	31	10	254	234	92
4	**Washington Capitals**	82	39	32	11	234	204	89
5	**Tampa Bay Lightning**	82	38	32	12	238	248	88
6	New Jersey Devils	82	37	33	12	215	202	86
7	New York Islanders	82	22	50	10	229	315	54

Eastern Conference
R		Div	GP	W	L	T	GF	GA	Pts
**1**	**Philadelphia Flyers**	**ATL**	**82**	**45**	**24**	**13**	**282**	**208**	**103**
**2**	**Pittsburgh Penguins**	**NE**	**82**	**49**	**29**	**4**	**362**	**284**	**102**
**3**	**New York Rangers**	**ATL**	**82**	**41**	**27**	**14**	**272**	**237**	**96**
**4**	**Florida Panthers**	**ATL**	**82**	**41**	**31**	**10**	**254**	**234**	**92**
**5**	**Boston Bruins**	**NE**	**82**	**40**	**31**	**11**	**282**	**269**	**91**
**6**	**Montreal Canadiens**	**NE**	**82**	**40**	**32**	**10**	**265**	**248**	**90**
**7**	**Washington Capitals**	**ATL**	**82**	**39**	**32**	**11**	**234**	**204**	**89**
**8**	**Tampa Bay Lightning**	**ATL**	**82**	**38**	**32**	**12**	**238**	**248**	**88**
9	New Jersey Devils	ATL	82	37	33	12	215	202	86
10	Hartford Whalers	NE	82	34	39	9	237	259	77
11	Buffalo Sabres	NE	82	33	42	7	247	262	73
12	New York Islanders	ATL	82	22	50	10	229	315	54
13	Ottawa Senators	NE	82	18	59	5	191	291	41

Divisions: ATL – Atlantic, NE – Northeast

bold – Qualified for playoffs

== Schedule and results ==
=== Regular season ===
1995–96 regular season
October: 7–3–0 (home: 3–1–0; road: 4–2–0)

Game	Date	Score	Opponent	Record	Recap
1	October 7, 1995	4–1	St. Louis Blues (1995–96)	1–0–0	W
2	October 11, 1995	1–2	@ Philadelphia Flyers (1995–96)	1–1–0	L
3	October 13, 1995	3–1	Colorado Avalanche (1995–96)	2–1–0	W
4	October 14, 1995	2–0	Tampa Bay Lightning (1995–96)	3–1–0	W
5	October 17, 1995	4–3	@ Dallas Stars (1995–96)	4–1–0	W
6	October 18, 1995	2–4	@ Colorado Avalanche (1995–96)	4–2–0	L
7	October 20, 1995	4–7	Los Angeles Kings (1995–96)	4–3–0	L
8	October 26, 1995	4–2	@ Boston Bruins (1995–96)	5–3–0	W
9	October 28, 1995	4–2	@ Tampa Bay Lightning (1995–96)	6–3–0	W
10	October 29, 1995	3–1	@ St. Louis Blues (1995–96)	7–3–0	W

November: 4–8–2 (home: 2–5–1; road: 2–3–1)

Game	Date	Score	Opponent	Record	Recap
11	November 1, 1995	5–2	Montreal Canadiens (1995–96)	8–3–0	W
12	November 3, 1995	2–3	Florida Panthers (1995–96)	8–4–0	L
13	November 4, 1995	3–2	@ New York Islanders (1995–96)	9–4–0	W
14	November 7, 1995	3–4	Boston Bruins (1995–96)	9–5–0	L
15	November 10, 1995	1–6	@ Toronto Maple Leafs (1995–96)	9–6–0	L
16	November 11, 1995	1–4	Chicago Blackhawks (1995–96)	9–7–0	L
17	November 14, 1995	2–2 OT	Philadelphia Flyers (1995–96)	9–7–1	T
18	November 17, 1995	2–3 OT	Pittsburgh Penguins (1995–96)	9–8–1	L
19	November 18, 1995	0–3	@ Pittsburgh Penguins (1995–96)	9–9–1	L
20	November 21, 1995	3–2	San Jose Sharks (1995–96)	10–9–1	W
21	November 24, 1995	1–2	Tampa Bay Lightning (1995–96)	10–10–1	L
22	November 25, 1995	4–2	@ Hartford Whalers (1995–96)	11–10–1	W
23	November 29, 1995	2–2 OT	@ Mighty Ducks of Anaheim (1995–96)	11–10–2	T
24	November 30, 1995	2–3	@ Los Angeles Kings (1995–96)	11–11–2	L

December: 7–4–1 (home: 5–1–0; road: 2–3–1)

Game	Date	Score	Opponent	Record	Recap
25	December 2, 1995	3–5	@ San Jose Sharks (1995–96)	11–12–2	L
26	December 5, 1995	3–4	Florida Panthers (1995–96)	11–13–2	L
27	December 8, 1995	2–2 OT	@ Buffalo Sabres (1995–96)	11–13–3	T
28	December 10, 1995	6–1	@ Winnipeg Jets (1995–96)	12–13–3	W
29	December 14, 1995	4–3 OT	New York Islanders (1995–96)	13–13–3	W
30	December 16, 1995	3–2	New York Rangers (1995–96)	14–13–3	W
31	December 18, 1995	0–3	@ New York Rangers (1995–96)	14–14–3	L
32	December 22, 1995	6–3	Edmonton Oilers (1995–96)	15–14–3	W
33	December 23, 1995	1–3	@ New York Islanders (1995–96)	15–15–3	L
34	December 26, 1995	4–0	Montreal Canadiens (1995–96)	16–15–3	W
35	December 28, 1995	5–4	@ Florida Panthers (1995–96)	17–15–3	W
36	December 30, 1995	3–0	Hartford Whalers (1995–96)	18–15–3	W

January: 5–6–2 (home: 4–2–2; road: 1–4–0)

Game	Date	Score	Opponent	Record	Recap
37	January 1, 1996	4–2	Pittsburgh Penguins (1995–96)	19–15–3	W
38	January 3, 1996	0–2	@ Hartford Whalers (1995–96)	19–16–3	L
39	January 5, 1996	4–4 OT	New York Rangers (1995–96)	19–16–4	T
40	January 6, 1996	1–3	@ New Jersey Devils (1995–96)	19–17–4	L
41	January 11, 1996	6–1	Ottawa Senators (1995–96)	20–17–4	W
42	January 13, 1996	2–4	Detroit Red Wings (1995–96)	20–18–4	L
43	January 16, 1996	1–1 OT	Winnipeg Jets (1995–96)	20–18–5	T
44	January 17, 1996	3–2	@ Chicago Blackhawks (1995–96)	21–18–5	W
45	January 23, 1996	4–5	Florida Panthers (1995–96)	21–19–5	L
46	January 25, 1996	1–3	@ New Jersey Devils (1995–96)	21–20–5	L
47	January 26, 1996	1–0	Buffalo Sabres (1995–96)	22–20–5	W
48	January 28, 1996	3–2 OT	Philadelphia Flyers (1995–96)	23–20–5	W
49	January 31, 1996	3–5	@ Montreal Canadiens (1995–96)	23–21–5	L

February: 6–4–3 (home: 3–1–0; road: 3–3–3)

Game	Date	Score	Opponent	Record	Recap
50	February 1, 1996	4–2	@ Ottawa Senators (1995–96)	24–21–5	W
51	February 3, 1996	6–5 OT	New York Islanders (1995–96)	25–21–5	W
52	February 7, 1996	2–1	@ Edmonton Oilers (1995–96)	26–21–5	W
53	February 8, 1996	4–4 OT	@ Calgary Flames (1995–96)	26–21–6	T
54	February 10, 1996	4–4 OT	@ Vancouver Canucks (1995–96)	26–21–7	T
55	February 13, 1996	3–2	Calgary Flames (1995–96)	27–21–7	W
56	February 15, 1996	3–4	@ Detroit Red Wings (1995–96)	27–22–7	L
57	February 16, 1996	4–3	Toronto Maple Leafs (1995–96)	28–22–7	W
58	February 18, 1996	0–3	@ New Jersey Devils (1995–96)	28–23–7	L
59	February 22, 1996	3–5	@ Philadelphia Flyers (1995–96)	28–24–7	L
60	February 24, 1996	1–2	New Jersey Devils (1995–96)	28–25–7	L
61	February 27, 1996	5–3	@ New York Rangers (1995–96)	29–25–7	W
62	February 29, 1996	2–2 OT	@ Florida Panthers (1995–96)	29–25–8	T

March: 7–4–3 (home: 4–3–2; road: 3–1–1)

Game	Date	Score	Opponent	Record	Recap
63	March 2, 1996	2–0	@ Boston Bruins (1995–96)	30–25–8	W
64	March 3, 1996	3–0	Philadelphia Flyers (1995–96)	31–25–8	W
65	March 9, 1996	1–6	New York Rangers (1995–96)	31–26–8	L
66	March 10, 1996	0–1	@ Tampa Bay Lightning (1995–96)	31–27–8	L
67	March 12, 1996	9–0	Vancouver Canucks (1995–96)	32–27–8	W
68	March 15, 1996	2–5	Boston Bruins (1995–96)	32–28–8	L
69	March 17, 1996	2–1	Dallas Stars (1995–96)	33–28–8	W
70	March 19, 1996	1–2	Mighty Ducks of Anaheim (1995–96)	33–29–8	L
71	March 21, 1996	3–3 OT	@ Tampa Bay Lightning (1995–96)	33–29–9	T
72	March 23, 1996	2–2 OT	Hartford Whalers (1995–96)	33–29–10	T
73	March 26, 1996	7–1	@ New York Islanders (1995–96)	34–29–10	W
74	March 27, 1996	1–0 OT	@ Montreal Canadiens (1995–96)	35–29–10	W
75	March 29, 1996	5–0	Ottawa Senators (1995–96)	36–29–10	W
76	March 31, 1996	1–1 OT	Tampa Bay Lightning (1995–96)	36–29–11	T

April: 3–3–0 (home: 0–2–0; road: 3–1–0)

Game	Date	Score	Opponent	Record	Recap
77	April 3, 1996	5–1	@ Buffalo Sabres (1995–96)	37–29–11	W
78	April 4, 1996	2–4	@ Pittsburgh Penguins (1995–96)	37–30–11	L
79	April 6, 1996	4–3	@ Ottawa Senators (1995–96)	38–30–11	W
80	April 10, 1996	4–1	@ New York Rangers (1995–96)	39–30–11	W
81	April 11, 1996	2–3	New Jersey Devils (1995–96)	39–31–11	L
82	April 13, 1996	2–3	Buffalo Sabres (1995–96)	39–32–11	L

Legend: W Win (2 points) L Loss (0 points) T Tie (1 point)

=== Playoffs ===
1996 Stanley Cup playoffs
Eastern Conference Quarterfinals vs. (2) Pittsburgh Penguins – Penguins win 4–2

Game	Date	Score	Opponent	Series	Recap
1	April 17, 1996	6–4	@ Pittsburgh Penguins	Capitals lead 1–0	W
2	April 19, 1996	5–3	@ Pittsburgh Penguins	Capitals lead 2–0	W
3	April 22, 1996	1–4	Pittsburgh Penguins	Capitals lead 2–1	L
4	April 24, 1996	2–3 4OT	Pittsburgh Penguins	Series tied 2–2	L
5	April 26, 1996	1–4	@ Pittsburgh Penguins	Penguins lead 3–2	L
6	April 28, 1996	2–3	Pittsburgh Penguins	Penguins win 4–2	L

Legend: W Win L Loss

== Player statistics ==
=== Scoring ===
- Position abbreviations: C = Center; D = Defense; G = Goaltender; LW = Left wing; RW = Right wing
- † = Joined team via a transaction (e.g., trade, waivers, signing) during the season. Stats reflect time with the Capitals only.
- ‡ = Left team via a transaction (e.g., trade, waivers, release) during the season. Stats reflect time with the Capitals only.

No.	Player	Pos	Regular season						Playoffs					
No.	Player	Pos	GP	G	A	Pts	+/-	PIM	GP	G	A	Pts	+/-	PIM
20	Michal Pivonka	C	73	16	65	81	18	36	6	3	2	5	1	18
12	Peter Bondra	RW	67	52	28	80	18	40	6	3	2	5	0	8
90	Joe Juneau	C	80	14	50	64	−3	30	5	0	7	7	−4	6
22	Steve Konowalchuk	LW	70	23	22	45	13	92	2	0	2	2	1	0
9 (Note: Jones wore number 26 through November 14.)	Keith Jones	RW	68	18	23	41	8	103	2	0	0	0	−1	7
55	Sergei Gonchar	D	78	15	26	41	25	60	6	2	4	6	−1	4
3	Sylvain Cote	D	81	5	33	38	5	40	6	2	0	2	−3	12
32	Dale Hunter	C	82	13	24	37	5	112	6	1	5	6	4	24
14	Pat Peake	C	62	17	19	36	7	46	5	2	1	3	−4	12
6	Calle Johansson	D	78	10	25	35	13	50	—	—	—	—	—	—
10	Kelly Miller	LW	74	7	13	20	7	30	6	0	1	1	−1	4
16	Stefan Ustorf	C	48	7	10	17	8	14	5	0	0	0	−1	0
24	Mark Tinordi	D	71	3	10	13	26	113	6	0	0	0	−2	16
27	Craig Berube	LW	50	2	10	12	1	151	2	0	0	0	−1	19
2	Ken Klee	D	66	8	3	11	−1	60	1	0	0	0	0	0
21	Todd Krygier†	LW	16	6	5	11	8	12	6	2	0	2	−3	12
36	Mike Eagles	C	70	4	7	11	−1	75	6	1	1	2	1	2
29	Joe Reekie	D	78	3	7	10	7	149	—	—	—	—	—	—
11	Jeff Nelson	C	33	0	7	7	3	16	3	0	0	0	0	4
18	Andrew Brunette	LW	11	3	3	6	5	0	6	1	3	4	−5	0
4	Jim Johnson	D	66	2	4	6	−3	34	6	0	0	0	−2	6
19	Brendan Witt	D	48	2	3	5	−4	85	—	—	—	—	—	—
34	Martin Gendron	RW	20	2	1	3	−5	8	—	—	—	—	—	—
23	Kevin Kaminski	C	54	1	2	3	−1	164	3	0	0	0	0	16
41	Jason Allison	C	19	0	3	3	−3	2	—	—	—	—	—	—
15	Steve Poapst	D	3	1	0	1	−1	0	6	0	0	0	0	0
30	Jim Carey	G	71	0	1	1		6	3	0	0	0		0
28	Eric Charron†	D	4	0	1	1	3	4	6	0	0	0	1	8
38	Nolan Baumgartner	D	1	0	0	0	−1	0	1	0	0	0	−1	10
26	Denis Chasse†‡	RW	3	0	0	0	−1	5	—	—	—	—	—	—
37	Olaf Kolzig	G	18	0	0	0		2	5	0	0	0		4
26	Stewart Malgunas†	D	1	0	0	0	0	0	—	—	—	—	—	—
8	Richard Zednik	RW	1	0	0	0	0	0	—	—	—	—	—	—

=== Goaltending ===
No.	Player	Regular season										Playoffs								
No.	Player	GP	W	L	T	SA	GA	GAA	SV%	SO	TOI	GP	W	L	SA	GA	GAA	SV%	SO	TOI
30	Jim Carey	71	35	24	9	1631	153	2.26	.906	9	4069	3	0	1	39	10	6.18	.744	0	97
37	Olaf Kolzig	18	4	8	2	406	46	3.08	.887	0	897	5	2	3	167	11	1.93	.934	0	341

== Awards and records ==
=== Awards ===
Type	Award/honor	Recipient	Ref
League (annual)	Lester Patrick Trophy	Milt Schmidt	
League (annual)	NHL First All-Star team	Jim Carey (Goaltender)	
League (annual)	Vezina Trophy	Jim Carey	
League (in-season)	NHL All-Star Game selection	Peter Bondra	

=== Milestones ===
Milestone	Player	Date	Ref
First game	Stefan Ustorf	October 7, 1995	
First game	Brendan Witt	October 7, 1995	
First game	Nolan Baumgartner	October 18, 1995	
First game	Andrew Brunette	January 17, 1996	
First game	Steve Poapst	April 10, 1996	
First game	Richard Zednik	April 13, 1996	

== Draft picks ==
Washington's draft picks at the 1995 NHL entry draft held at the Edmonton Coliseum in Edmonton, Alberta.

Round	#	Player	Nationality	College/Junior/Club team (League)
1	17	Brad Church	Canada	Prince Albert Raiders (WHL)
1	23	Miika Elomo	Finland	Kiekko-67 Turku (Finland)
2	43	Dwayne Hay	Canada	Guelph Storm (OHL)
4	93	Sebastien Charpentier	Canada	Laval Titan College Francais (QMJHL)
4	95	Joel Theriault	Canada	Beauport Harfangs (QMJHL)
5	105	Benoit Gratton	Canada	Laval Titan College Francais (QMJHL)
5	124	Joel Cort	Canada	Guelph Storm (OHL)
6	147	Frederick Jobin	Canada	Laval Titan College Francais (QMJHL)
8	199	Vasili Turkovsky	Russia	CSKA Moscow (Russia)
9	225	Scott Swanson	United States	Omaha Lancers (USHL)

== See also ==
- 1995–96 NHL season
