= 1995–96 Tampa Bay Lightning season =

National Hockey League team season

1995–96 Tampa Bay Lightning
- Division: 5th Atlantic
- Conference: 8th Eastern
- 1995–96 record: 38–32–12
- Home record: 22–14–5
- Road record: 16–18–7
- Goals for: 238
- Goals against: 248

Team information
- General manager: Phil Esposito
- Coach: Terry Crisp
- Captain: Paul Ysebaert
- Arena: ThunderDome
- Average attendance: 18,880
- Minor league affiliates: Atlanta Knights; Nashville Knights

Team leaders
- Goals: Alexander Selivanov (31)
- Assists: Brian Bradley (56)
- Points: Brian Bradley (79)
- Penalty minutes: Enrico Ciccone (258)
- Plus/minus: Rob Zamuner (+11)
- Wins: Daren Puppa (29)
- Goals against average: Daren Puppa (2.46)

The 1995–96 Tampa Bay Lightning season was the Lightning fourth season of operation in the National Hockey League (NHL). The Lightning finished with a record of 38-32-12 and qualified for the playoffs for the first time in franchise history.

It would also be the Lightning's third and final season in the ThunderDome before moving into their next and current home, the Ice Palace.

== Regular season ==
The Lightning tied the New York Rangers and the Ottawa Senators for fewest short-handed goals scored (6).

=== Final standings ===
Atlantic Division
No.		GP	W	L	T	GF	GA	Pts
1	**Philadelphia Flyers**	82	45	24	13	282	208	103
2	**New York Rangers**	82	41	27	14	272	237	96
3	**Florida Panthers**	82	41	31	10	254	234	92
4	**Washington Capitals**	82	39	32	11	234	204	89
5	**Tampa Bay Lightning**	82	38	32	12	238	248	88
6	New Jersey Devils	82	37	33	12	215	202	86
7	New York Islanders	82	22	50	10	229	315	54

Eastern Conference
R		Div	GP	W	L	T	GF	GA	Pts
**1**	**Philadelphia Flyers**	**ATL**	**82**	**45**	**24**	**13**	**282**	**208**	**103**
**2**	**Pittsburgh Penguins**	**NE**	**82**	**49**	**29**	**4**	**362**	**284**	**102**
**3**	**New York Rangers**	**ATL**	**82**	**41**	**27**	**14**	**272**	**237**	**96**
**4**	**Florida Panthers**	**ATL**	**82**	**41**	**31**	**10**	**254**	**234**	**92**
**5**	**Boston Bruins**	**NE**	**82**	**40**	**31**	**11**	**282**	**269**	**91**
**6**	**Montreal Canadiens**	**NE**	**82**	**40**	**32**	**10**	**265**	**248**	**90**
**7**	**Washington Capitals**	**ATL**	**82**	**39**	**32**	**11**	**234**	**204**	**89**
**8**	**Tampa Bay Lightning**	**ATL**	**82**	**38**	**32**	**12**	**238**	**248**	**88**
9	New Jersey Devils	ATL	82	37	33	12	215	202	86
10	Hartford Whalers	NE	82	34	39	9	237	259	77
11	Buffalo Sabres	NE	82	33	42	7	247	262	73
12	New York Islanders	ATL	82	22	50	10	229	315	54
13	Ottawa Senators	NE	82	18	59	5	191	291	41

Divisions: ATL – Atlantic, NE – Northeast

bold – Qualified for playoffs

== Playoffs ==
=== Eastern Conference Quarterfinals ===
==== (1) Philadelphia Flyers vs. (8) Tampa Bay Lightning ====
The series opened up in Philadelphia. The Flyers won Game 1 7–3, but the Lightning rebounded in Game 2 by a 2–1 overtime win. Games 3 and 4 were in Tampa Bay. The Lightning won again in overtime in Game 3, but this time, by a score of 5–4. However, the series was tied up at 2-2 thanks to Philadelphia's 4–1 win in Game 4. The series shifted back to Philadelphia, where the Flyers won 4-1 again in Game 5. In Game 6, Philadelphia won 6-1 and won the series 4–2.

== Schedule and results ==
=== Regular season ===
1995–96 regular season
October: 2–4–4 (home: 1–2–2; road: 1–2–2)

Game	Date	Score	Opponent	Record	Recap
1	October 7, 1995	3–3 OT	Calgary Flames (1995–96)	0–0–1	T
2	October 12, 1995	3–1	Montreal Canadiens (1995–96)	1–0–1	W
3	October 14, 1995	0–2	@ Washington Capitals (1995–96)	1–1–1	L
4	October 15, 1995	4–7	Ottawa Senators (1995–96)	1–2–1	L
5	October 17, 1995	2–5	@ Winnipeg Jets (1995–96)	1–3–1	L
6	October 19, 1995	4–1	@ Chicago Blackhawks (1995–96)	2–3–1	W
7	October 21, 1995	3–3 OT	@ Dallas Stars (1995–96)	2–3–2	T
8	October 26, 1995	4–4 OT	New York Rangers (1995–96)	2–3–3	T
9	October 28, 1995	2–4	Washington Capitals (1995–96)	2–4–3	L
10	October 31, 1995	2–2 OT	@ Philadelphia Flyers (1995–96)	2–4–4	T

November: 7–6–1 (home: 5–3–1; road: 2–3–0)

Game	Date	Score	Opponent	Record	Recap
11	November 1, 1995	0–10	@ Pittsburgh Penguins (1995–96)	2–5–4	L
12	November 3, 1995	5–3	New York Islanders (1995–96)	3–5–4	W
13	November 5, 1995	1–4	@ Florida Panthers (1995–96)	3–6–4	L
14	November 8, 1995	4–5	@ New York Rangers (1995–96)	3–7–4	L
15	November 10, 1995	3–4 OT	Edmonton Oilers (1995–96)	3–8–4	L
16	November 12, 1995	4–6	Buffalo Sabres (1995–96)	3–9–4	L
17	November 14, 1995	5–3	Boston Bruins (1995–96)	4–9–4	W
18	November 16, 1995	4–5 OT	Toronto Maple Leafs (1995–96)	4–10–4	L
19	November 18, 1995	5–4 OT	Vancouver Canucks (1995–96)	5–10–4	W
20	November 22, 1995	3–1	New Jersey Devils (1995–96)	6–10–4	W
21	November 24, 1995	2–1	@ Washington Capitals (1995–96)	7–10–4	W
22	November 25, 1995	2–1	@ New York Islanders (1995–96)	8–10–4	W
23	November 27, 1995	2–0	Los Angeles Kings (1995–96)	9–10–4	W
24	November 29, 1995	2–2 OT	Hartford Whalers (1995–96)	9–10–5	T

December: 7–5–1 (home: 4–2–1; road: 3–3–0)

Game	Date	Score	Opponent	Record	Recap
25	December 1, 1995	1–5	@ New Jersey Devils (1995–96)	9–11–5	L
26	December 3, 1995	4–5	Pittsburgh Penguins (1995–96)	9–12–5	L
27	December 6, 1995	2–1	Mighty Ducks of Anaheim (1995–96)	10–12–5	W
28	December 8, 1995	3–1	Boston Bruins (1995–96)	11–12–5	W
29	December 11, 1995	6–1	@ Buffalo Sabres (1995–96)	12–12–5	W
30	December 13, 1995	3–2	@ Hartford Whalers (1995–96)	13–12–5	W
31	December 14, 1995	0–4	@ Philadelphia Flyers (1995–96)	13–13–5	L
32	December 16, 1995	2–7	Florida Panthers (1995–96)	13–14–5	L
33	December 19, 1995	6–3	Winnipeg Jets (1995–96)	14–14–5	W
34	December 21, 1995	2–2 OT	New Jersey Devils (1995–96)	14–14–6	T
35	December 23, 1995	5–7	@ Boston Bruins (1995–96)	14–15–6	L
36	December 28, 1995	3–1	Montreal Canadiens (1995–96)	15–15–6	W
37	December 31, 1995	3–0	@ Ottawa Senators (1995–96)	16–15–6	W

January: 5–5–1 (home: 3–0–0; road: 2–5–1)

Game	Date	Score	Opponent	Record	Recap
38	January 2, 1996	0–10	@ Calgary Flames (1995–96)	16–16–6	L
39	January 3, 1996	5–0	@ Edmonton Oilers (1995–96)	17–16–6	W
40	January 6, 1996	2–9	@ Vancouver Canucks (1995–96)	17–17–6	L
41	January 8, 1996	3–3 OT	@ Montreal Canadiens (1995–96)	17–17–7	T
42	January 13, 1996	4–1	Ottawa Senators (1995–96)	18–17–7	W
43	January 15, 1996	2–3	@ New York Islanders (1995–96)	18–18–7	L
44	January 17, 1996	6–4	San Jose Sharks (1995–96)	19–18–7	W
45	January 22, 1996	4–1	@ Montreal Canadiens (1995–96)	20–18–7	W
46	January 25, 1996	3–4	@ Boston Bruins (1995–96)	20–19–7	L
47	January 27, 1996	1–2	@ St. Louis Blues (1995–96)	20–20–7	L
48	January 31, 1996	4–1	Pittsburgh Penguins (1995–96)	21–20–7	W

February: 7–5–1 (home: 3–4–0; road: 4–1–1)

Game	Date	Score	Opponent	Record	Recap
49	February 3, 1996	3–5	Florida Panthers (1995–96)	21–21–7	L
50	February 4, 1996	5–2	@ Buffalo Sabres (1995–96)	22–21–7	W
51	February 7, 1996	4–4 OT	@ Colorado Avalanche (1995–96)	22–21–8	T
52	February 10, 1996	2–3 OT	Detroit Red Wings (1995–96)	22–22–8	L
53	February 11, 1996	2–6	New York Rangers (1995–96)	22–23–8	L
54	February 13, 1996	2–3	St. Louis Blues (1995–96)	22–24–8	L
55	February 15, 1996	4–2	Colorado Avalanche (1995–96)	23–24–8	W
56	February 17, 1996	5–2	Philadelphia Flyers (1995–96)	24–24–8	W
57	February 19, 1996	4–2	Dallas Stars (1995–96)	25–24–8	W
58	February 21, 1996	3–2 OT	@ Toronto Maple Leafs (1995–96)	26–24–8	W
59	February 23, 1996	3–2 OT	@ New York Islanders (1995–96)	27–24–8	W
60	February 24, 1996	0–2	@ Detroit Red Wings (1995–96)	27–25–8	L
61	February 28, 1996	5–1	@ Los Angeles Kings (1995–96)	28–25–8	W

March: 6–4–4 (home: 4–1–1; road: 2–3–3)

Game	Date	Score	Opponent	Record	Recap
62	March 1, 1996	7–3	@ San Jose Sharks (1995–96)	29–25–8	W
63	March 3, 1996	2–2 OT	@ Mighty Ducks of Anaheim (1995–96)	29–25–9	T
64	March 5, 1996	2–0	Chicago Blackhawks (1995–96)	30–25–9	W
65	March 7, 1996	5–2	New York Rangers (1995–96)	31–25–9	W
66	March 10, 1996	1–0	Washington Capitals (1995–96)	32–25–9	W
67	March 13, 1996	1–1 OT	@ Philadelphia Flyers (1995–96)	32–25–10	T
68	March 15, 1996	0–5	@ New Jersey Devils (1995–96)	32–26–10	L
69	March 17, 1996	0–5	@ Ottawa Senators (1995–96)	32–27–10	L
70	March 18, 1996	3–6	@ Hartford Whalers (1995–96)	32–28–10	L
71	March 21, 1996	3–3 OT	Washington Capitals (1995–96)	32–28–11	T
72	March 23, 1996	4–2	Florida Panthers (1995–96)	33–28–11	W
73	March 26, 1996	4–6	New Jersey Devils (1995–96)	33–29–11	L
74	March 30, 1996	2–1	@ Florida Panthers (1995–96)	34–29–11	W
75	March 31, 1996	1–1 OT	@ Washington Capitals (1995–96)	34–29–12	T

April: 4–3–0 (home: 2–2–0; road: 2–1–0)

Game	Date	Score	Opponent	Record	Recap
76	April 3, 1996	4–2	Hartford Whalers (1995–96)	35–29–12	W
77	April 5, 1996	3–4	Buffalo Sabres (1995–96)	35–30–12	L
78	April 6, 1996	1–2	@ Pittsburgh Penguins (1995–96)	35–31–12	L
79	April 8, 1996	4–3	New York Islanders (1995–96)	36–31–12	W
80	April 10, 1996	2–1	@ Florida Panthers (1995–96)	37–31–12	W
81	April 12, 1996	3–2	@ New York Rangers (1995–96)	38–31–12	W
82	April 14, 1996	1–3	Philadelphia Flyers (1995–96)	38–32–12	L

Legend: W Win (2 points) L Loss (0 points) T Tie (1 point)

=== Playoffs ===
1996 Stanley Cup playoffs
Eastern Conference Quarterfinals vs. (1) Philadelphia Flyers – Flyers win 4–2

Game	Date	Score	Opponent	Series	Recap
1	April 16, 1996	3–7	@ Philadelphia Flyers	Flyers lead 1–0	L
2	April 18, 1996	2–1 OT	@ Philadelphia Flyers	Series tied 1–1	W
3	April 21, 1996	5–4 OT	Philadelphia Flyers	Lightning lead 2–1	W
4	April 23, 1996	1–4	Philadelphia Flyers	Series tied 2–2	L
5	April 25, 1996	1–4	@ Philadelphia Flyers	Flyers lead 3–2	L
6	April 27, 1996	1–6	Philadelphia Flyers	Flyers win 4–2	L

Legend: W Win L Loss

== Player statistics ==
=== Scoring ===
- Position abbreviations: C = Center; D = Defense; G = Goaltender; LW = Left wing; RW = Right wing
- † = Joined team via a transaction (e.g., trade, waivers, signing) during the season. Stats reflect time with the Lightning only.
- ‡ = Left team via a transaction (e.g., trade, waivers, release) during the season. Stats reflect time with the Lightning only.

No.	Player	Pos	Regular season						Playoffs					
No.	Player	Pos	GP	G	A	Pts	+/-	PIM	GP	G	A	Pts	+/-	PIM
19	Brian Bradley	C	75	23	56	79	−11	77	5	0	3	3	−5	6
44	Roman Hamrlik	D	82	16	49	65	−24	103	5	0	1	1	−1	4
29	Alex Selivanov	RW	79	31	21	52	3	93	6	2	2	4	2	6
85	Petr Klima	W	67	22	30	52	−25	68	4	2	0	2	0	14
12	John Cullen	C	76	16	34	50	1	65	5	3	3	6	4	0
23	Brian Bellows	LW	79	23	26	49	−14	39	6	2	0	2	−2	4
77	Chris Gratton	C	82	17	21	38	−13	105	6	0	2	2	−3	27
7	Rob Zamuner	LW	72	15	20	35	11	62	6	2	3	5	−1	10
15	Paul Ysebaert	C	55	16	15	31	−19	16	5	0	0	0	−6	0
11	Shawn Burr	LW	81	13	15	28	4	119	6	0	2	2	0	8
2	Bill Houlder	D	61	5	23	28	1	22	6	0	1	1	0	4
34	Mikael Andersson	LW	64	8	11	19	0	2	6	1	1	2	0	0
24	Jason Wiemer	C	66	9	9	18	−9	81	6	1	0	1	−3	28
4	Cory Cross	D	75	2	14	16	4	66	6	0	0	0	−4	22
22	Aaron Gavey	C	73	8	4	12	−6	56	6	0	0	0	−3	4
27	David Shaw	D	66	1	11	12	5	64	6	0	1	1	−4	4
95	Michel Petit†	D	45	4	7	11	−10	108	6	0	0	0	−3	20
14	John Tucker	C	63	3	7	10	−8	18	2	0	0	0	−1	2
39	Enrico Ciccone‡	D	55	2	3	5	−4	258	—	—	—	—	—	—
20	Rudy Poeschek	RW	57	1	3	4	−2	88	3	0	0	0	0	12
5	Igor Ulanov†	D	11	2	1	3	−1	24	5	0	0	0	−1	15
6	Adrien Plavsic	D	7	1	2	3	5	6	—	—	—	—	—	—
5	Drew Bannister	D	13	0	1	1	−1	4	—	—	—	—	—	—
18	Daymond Langkow	C	4	0	1	1	−1	0	—	—	—	—	—	—
28	Patrick Poulin†	C	8	0	1	1	0	0	2	0	0	0	0	0
93	Daren Puppa	G	57	0	1	1		4	4	0	0	0		0
30	Jean-Claude Bergeron	G	12	0	0	0		0	—	—	—	—	—	—
3	Eric Charron‡	D	14	0	0	0	−6	18	—	—	—	—	—	—
25	Allan Egeland	C	5	0	0	0	0	2	—	—	—	—	—	—
28	Steven Finn‡	D	16	0	0	0	−6	24	—	—	—	—	—	—
21	Bob Halkidis‡	D	3	0	0	0	−1	7	—	—	—	—	—	—
26	Chris LiPuma	D	21	0	0	0	−7	13	—	—	—	—	—	—
1	Jeff Reese†	G	19	0	0	0		0	5	0	0	0		0
9	Jeff Toms	C	1	0	0	0	0	0	—	—	—	—	—	—
35	Derek Wilkinson	G	4	0	0	0		2	—	—	—	—	—	—

=== Goaltending ===
- † = Joined team via a transaction (e.g., trade, waivers, signing) during the season. Stats reflect time with the Lightning only.

No.	Player	Regular season										Playoffs								
No.	Player	GP	W	L	T	SA	GA	GAA	SV%	SO	TOI	GP	W	L	SA	GA	GAA	SV%	SO	TOI
93	Daren Puppa	57	29	16	9	1605	131	2.46	.918	5	3189	4	1	3	86	14	4.85	.837	0	173
1	Jeff Reese†	19	7	7	1	464	54	3.26	.884	0	994	5	1	1	100	12	3.64	.880	0	198
30	Jean-Claude Bergeron	12	2	6	2	250	42	4.23	.832	0	595	—	—	—	—	—	—	—	—	—
35	Derek Wilkinson	4	0	3	0	105	15	4.50	.857	0	200	—	—	—	—	—	—	—	—	—

== Awards and records ==
=== Awards ===
Type	Award/honor	Recipient	Ref
League (in-season)	NHL All-Star Game selection	Roman Hamrlik	

=== Records ===
The Tampa Bay Lightning tied its team record worst defeat from 1993, 2–9 against the Vancouver Canucks.

=== Milestones ===
Milestone	Player	Date	Ref
First game	Aaron Gavey	October 7, 1995	
First game	Daymond Langkow	October 7, 1995	
First game	Derek Wilkinson	November 8, 1995	
First game	Drew Bannister	November 12, 1995	
First game	Allan Egeland	January 22, 1996	
First game	Jeff Toms	February 13, 1996	
1,000th game played	Brian Bellows	January 31, 1996	

== Draft picks ==
Tampa Bay's draft picks at the 1995 NHL entry draft held at the Edmonton Coliseum in Edmonton, Alberta.

Round	#	Player	Nationality	College/Junior/Club team (League)
1	5	Daymond Langkow	Canada	Tri-City Americans (WHL)
2	30	Mike McBain	Canada	Red Deer Rebels (WHL)
3	56	Shane Willis	Canada	Prince Albert Raiders (WHL)
5	108	Konstantin Golokhvastov	Russia	Dynamo Moscow (Russia)
6	134	Eduard Pershin	Russia	Moscow Dynamo (Russia)
7	160	Cory Murphy	Canada	Sault Ste. Marie Greyhounds (OHL)
8	186	Joe Cardarelli	Canada	Spokane Chiefs (WHL)
9	212	Zac Bierk	Canada	Peterborough Petes (OHL)

== See also ==
- 1995–96 NHL season
