= Alexei Yegorov (ice hockey, born 1975) =

Russian ice hockey player

- Born: May 21, 1975 Leningrad, Soviet Union
- Died: March 2, 2002 (aged 26) St. Petersburg, Russia
- Height: 5 ft 11 in (180 cm)
- Weight: 185 lb (84 kg; 13 st 3 lb)
- Position: Right Wing
- Shot: Left
- Played for: SKA Saint Petersburg; San Jose Sharks; Lokomotiv Yaroslavl
- NHL draft: 66th overall, 1994; San Jose Sharks
- Playing career: 1992–2002

Alexei Yurievich Yegorov (Russian: Алексей Юрьевич Егоров; May 21, 1975 – March 2, 2002) was a Russian professional ice hockey right winger. He played 11 games in the National Hockey League with the San Jose Sharks between 1995 and 1997.

== Playing career ==
Yegorov played eleven games in the National Hockey League in 1995–96 and 1996–97 for the San Jose Sharks, scoring three goals and three assists for six points. He scored all three of his goals in the same game for a hat trick against the Calgary Flames on February 20, 1996. In addition to the San Jose Sharks, Yegorov also played for the Kansas City Blades and Long Beach Ice Dogs of the IHL, the Kentucky Thoroughblades of the AHL, the Fort Worth Fire of the CHL, HC Dynamo Moscow of the RSL and SKA Saint Petersburg. He last played in the DEL for the Schwenningen Wild Wings.

== Death ==
Yegorov died after escaping an attack by drug dealers on March 2, 2002. He fell to his death during the incident. He was buried in St. Petersburg, Russia on March 8, 2002.

== Career statistics ==
=== Regular season and playoffs ===
			Regular season					Playoffs
Season	Team	League	GP	G	A	Pts	PIM	GP	G	A	Pts	PIM
1990–91	SKA–2 Leningrad	URS.3	12	1	1	2	8	—	—	—	—	—
1991–92	SKA Leningrad	CIS.2	54	6	3	9	26	—	—	—	—	—
1991–92	SKA–2 Leningrad	CIS.3	14	5	3	8	24	—	—	—	—	—
1992–93	SKA Saint Petersburg	RUS	17	1	2	3	10	6	3	1	4	6
1992–93	SKA–2 Saint Petersburg	RUS.2	19	5	9	14	38	—	—	—	—	—
1993–94	SKA Saint Petersburg	RUS	23	5	3	8	18	6	0	0	0	4
1993–94	SKA–2 Saint Petersburg	RUS.3	10	3	3	6	30	—	—	—	—	—
1994–95	SKA Saint Petersburg	RUS	10	2	1	3	10	—	—	—	—	—
1994–95	SKA–2 Saint Petersburg	RUS.2	8	5	9	14	4	—	—	—	—	—
1994–95	Fort Worth Fire	CHL	18	4	10	14	15	—	—	—	—	—
1995–96	San Jose Sharks	NHL	9	3	2	5	2	—	—	—	—	—
1995–96	Kansas City Blades	IHL	65	31	25	56	84	5	2	0	2	8
1996–97	San Jose Sharks	NHL	2	0	1	1	0	—	—	—	—	—
1996–97	Kentucky Thoroughblades	AHL	75	26	32	58	59	4	0	1	1	2
1997–98	Kentucky Thoroughblades	AHL	79	32	52	84	56	3	2	0	2	0
1998–99	Torpedo Yaroslavl	RSL	13	3	1	4	8	—	—	—	—	—
1998–99	SKA Saint Petersburg	RSL	25	8	9	17	30	—	—	—	—	—
1999–2000	Adirondack IceHawks	UHL	41	16	26	42	35	—	—	—	—	—
1999–2000	Long Beach Ice Dogs	IHL	20	4	9	13	8	6	1	0	1	2
2000–01	SERC Wild Wings	DEL	54	9	13	22	18	—	—	—	—	—
RUS & RSL totals			88	19	16	35	76	12	3	1	4	10
NHL totals			11	3	3	6	2	—	—	—	—	—

== See also ==
- List of ice hockey players who died during their playing career
