= 1995–96 New Jersey Devils season =

National Hockey League season

1995–96 New Jersey Devils
- Division: 6th Atlantic
- Conference: 9th Eastern
- 1995–96 record: 37–33–12
- Home record: 22–17–2
- Road record: 15–16–10
- Goals for: 215
- Goals against: 202

Team information
- General manager: Lou Lamoriello
- Coach: Jacques Lemaire
- Captain: Scott Stevens
- Alternate captains: Ken Daneyko; John MacLean
- Arena: Continental Airlines Arena
- Average attendance: 16,219
- Minor league affiliates: Albany River Rats; Raleigh IceCaps

Team leaders
- Goals: Steve Thomas (26)
- Assists: Steve Thomas (35)
- Points: Steve Thomas (61)
- Penalty minutes: Mike Peluso (146)
- Plus/minus: Bobby Holík and Brian Rolston (+9)
- Wins: Martin Brodeur (34)
- Goals against average: Corey Schwab (2.18)

The 1995–96 New Jersey Devils season was the 22nd season for the National Hockey League (NHL) franchise that was established on June 11, 1974, and 14th season since the franchise relocated from Colorado prior to the 1982–83 NHL season. After winning the Stanley Cup in the previous season, and qualifying for the playoffs for six seasons, the team failed to make the playoffs for the first time since 1989, losing their last game of the season with a chance to qualify for the postseason. They became the first defending Stanley Cup champions to fail to make the playoffs since the 1969–70 Montreal Canadiens.

== Regular season ==
The Devils were the least penalized team during the regular season, being shorthanded only 319 times. They also had the lowest shooting percentage in the NHL, scoring only 215 goals on 2,636 shots (8.2%).

=== Final standings ===
Atlantic Division
No.		GP	W	L	T	GF	GA	Pts
1	**Philadelphia Flyers**	82	45	24	13	282	208	103
2	**New York Rangers**	82	41	27	14	272	237	96
3	**Florida Panthers**	82	41	31	10	254	234	92
4	**Washington Capitals**	82	39	32	11	234	204	89
5	**Tampa Bay Lightning**	82	38	32	12	238	248	88
6	New Jersey Devils	82	37	33	12	215	202	86
7	New York Islanders	82	22	50	10	229	315	54

Eastern Conference
R		Div	GP	W	L	T	GF	GA	Pts
**1**	**Philadelphia Flyers**	**ATL**	**82**	**45**	**24**	**13**	**282**	**208**	**103**
**2**	**Pittsburgh Penguins**	**NE**	**82**	**49**	**29**	**4**	**362**	**284**	**102**
**3**	**New York Rangers**	**ATL**	**82**	**41**	**27**	**14**	**272**	**237**	**96**
**4**	**Florida Panthers**	**ATL**	**82**	**41**	**31**	**10**	**254**	**234**	**92**
**5**	**Boston Bruins**	**NE**	**82**	**40**	**31**	**11**	**282**	**269**	**91**
**6**	**Montreal Canadiens**	**NE**	**82**	**40**	**32**	**10**	**265**	**248**	**90**
**7**	**Washington Capitals**	**ATL**	**82**	**39**	**32**	**11**	**234**	**204**	**89**
**8**	**Tampa Bay Lightning**	**ATL**	**82**	**38**	**32**	**12**	**238**	**248**	**88**
9	New Jersey Devils	ATL	82	37	33	12	215	202	86
10	Hartford Whalers	NE	82	34	39	9	237	259	77
11	Buffalo Sabres	NE	82	33	42	7	247	262	73
12	New York Islanders	ATL	82	22	50	10	229	315	54
13	Ottawa Senators	NE	82	18	59	5	191	291	41

Divisions: ATL – Atlantic, NE – Northeast

bold – Qualified for playoffs

== Schedule and results ==
1995–96 regular season
October: 6–4–0 (home: 4–3–0; road: 2–1–0)

Game	Date	Score	Opponent	Record	Recap
1	October 7, 1995	4–0	Florida Panthers	1–0–0	W
2	October 12, 1995	4–1	Winnipeg Jets	2–0–0	W
3	October 14, 1995	4–1	@ Montreal Canadiens	3–0–0	W
4	October 15, 1995	4–3	@ Buffalo Sabres	4–0–0	W
5	October 17, 1995	1–3	Edmonton Oilers	4–1–0	L
6	October 19, 1995	4–2	Detroit Red Wings	5–1–0	W
7	October 21, 1995	4–1	Ottawa Senators	6–1–0	W
8	October 25, 1995	2–4	Vancouver Canucks	6–2–0	L
9	October 28, 1995	3–5	Pittsburgh Penguins	6–3–0	L
10	October 31, 1995	1–2	@ Edmonton Oilers	6–4–0	L

November: 5–6–3 (home: 3–2–0; road: 2–4–3)

Game	Date	Score	Opponent	Record	Recap
11	November 2, 1995	3–3 OT	@ San Jose Sharks	6–4–1	T
12	November 4, 1995	4–2	@ Los Angeles Kings	7–4–1	W
13	November 5, 1995	1–6	@ Mighty Ducks of Anaheim	7–5–1	L
14	November 8, 1995	1–2	Calgary Flames	7–6–1	L
15	November 11, 1995	4–2	Philadelphia Flyers	8–6–1	W
16	November 12, 1995	3–2	@ Philadelphia Flyers	9–6–1	W
17	November 14, 1995	1–0	Hartford Whalers	10–6–1	W
18	November 16, 1995	2–2 OT	@ Boston Bruins	10–6–2	T
19	November 18, 1995	4–5	Buffalo Sabres	10–7–2	L
20	November 21, 1995	3–4	@ Florida Panthers	10–8–2	L
21	November 22, 1995	1–3	@ Tampa Bay Lightning	10–9–2	L
22	November 25, 1995	0–2	@ Dallas Stars	10–10–2	L
23	November 27, 1995	1–1 OT	@ New York Rangers	10–10–3	T
24	November 29, 1995	4–3 OT	Colorado Avalanche	11–10–3	W

December: 4–9–1 (home: 4–3–0; road: 0–6–1)

Game	Date	Score	Opponent	Record	Recap
25	December 1, 1995	5–1	Tampa Bay Lightning	12–10–3	W
26	December 2, 1995	1–4	@ New York Islanders	12–11–3	L
27	December 6, 1995	2–4	@ Montreal Canadiens	12–12–3	L
28	December 7, 1995	1–2	Toronto Maple Leafs	12–13–3	L
29	December 9, 1995	4–2	New York Islanders	13–13–3	W
30	December 11, 1995	1–2	Florida Panthers	13–14–3	L
31	December 15, 1995	1–3	@ Detroit Red Wings	13–15–3	L
32	December 16, 1995	2–3	Buffalo Sabres	13–16–3	L
33	December 19, 1995	5–4 OT	Philadelphia Flyers	14–16–3	W
34	December 21, 1995	2–2 OT	@ Tampa Bay Lightning	14–16–4	T
35	December 23, 1995	1–2	@ Florida Panthers	14–17–4	L
36	December 27, 1995	5–3	New York Islanders	15–17–4	W
37	December 29, 1995	3–5	@ Winnipeg Jets	15–18–4	L
38	December 31, 1995	0–5	@ Chicago Blackhawks	15–19–4	L

January: 7–3–1 (home: 5–2–0; road: 2–1–1)

Game	Date	Score	Opponent	Record	Recap
39	January 3, 1996	1–0	@ Colorado Avalanche	16–19–4	W
40	January 6, 1996	3–1	Washington Capitals	17–19–4	W
41	January 9, 1996	4–2	St. Louis Blues	18–19–4	W
42	January 11, 1996	1–2	San Jose Sharks	18–20–4	L
43	January 13, 1996	2–3	@ Boston Bruins	18–21–4	L
44	January 14, 1996	7–2	Dallas Stars	19–21–4	W
45	January 16, 1996	2–4	Boston Bruins	19–22–4	L
46	January 23, 1996	3–1	Los Angeles Kings	20–22–4	W
47	January 25, 1996	3–1	Washington Capitals	21–22–4	W
48	January 27, 1996	4–4 OT	@ Hartford Whalers	21–22–5	T
49	January 30, 1996	3–2 OT	@ Vancouver Canucks	22–22–5	W

February: 5–3–3 (home: 3–2–1; road: 2–1–2)

Game	Date	Score	Opponent	Record	Recap
50	February 1, 1996	1–1 OT	@ Calgary Flames	22–22–6	T
51	February 3, 1996	3–2 OT	@ Ottawa Senators	23–22–6	W
52	February 7, 1996	1–1 OT	Pittsburgh Penguins	23–22–7	T
53	February 10, 1996	3–0	New York Rangers	24–22–7	W
54	February 11, 1996	2–4	Mighty Ducks of Anaheim	24–23–7	L
55	February 16, 1996	2–2 OT	@ Buffalo Sabres	24–23–8	T
56	February 18, 1996	3–0	Washington Capitals	25–23–8	W
57	February 19, 1996	1–4	@ Philadelphia Flyers	25–24–8	L
58	February 21, 1996	1–4	Florida Panthers	25–25–8	L
59	February 23, 1996	6–5	Montreal Canadiens	26–25–8	W
60	February 24, 1996	2–1	@ Washington Capitals	27–25–8	W

March: 7–4–4 (home: 2–2–1; road: 5–2–3)

Game	Date	Score	Opponent	Record	Recap
61	March 1, 1996	6–2	New York Islanders	28–25–8	W
62	March 2, 1996	4–1	@ Ottawa Senators	29–25–8	W
63	March 4, 1996	2–2 OT	@ New York Rangers	29–25–9	T
64	March 6, 1996	2–2 OT	@ Toronto Maple Leafs	29–25–10	T
65	March 9, 1996	4–3 OT	@ Pittsburgh Penguins	30–25–10	W
66	March 10, 1996	3–2 OT	@ Philadelphia Flyers	31–25–10	W
67	March 13, 1996	1–1 OT	Montreal Canadiens	31–25–11	T
68	March 15, 1996	5–0	Tampa Bay Lightning	32–25–11	W
69	March 17, 1996	0–3	@ Florida Panthers	32–26–11	L
70	March 20, 1996	1–2	Boston Bruins	32–27–11	L
71	March 22, 1996	2–4	Chicago Blackhawks	32–28–11	L
72	March 23, 1996	3–2 OT	@ New York Islanders	33–28–11	W
73	March 26, 1996	6–4	@ Tampa Bay Lightning	34–28–11	W
74	March 28, 1996	4–4 OT	@ St. Louis Blues	34–28–12	T
75	March 30, 1996	1–2	@ Pittsburgh Penguins	34–29–12	L

April: 3–4–0 (home: 1–3–0; road: 2–1–0)

Game	Date	Score	Opponent	Record	Recap
76	April 2, 1996	1–3	@ New York Rangers	34–30–12	L
77	April 4, 1996	0–1	Hartford Whalers	34–31–12	L
78	April 6, 1996	6–3	@ Hartford Whalers	35–31–12	W
79	April 7, 1996	4–2	New York Rangers	36–31–12	W
80	April 10, 1996	1–5	Philadelphia Flyers	36–32–12	L
81	April 11, 1996	3–2	@ Washington Capitals	37–32–12	W
82	April 13, 1996	2–5	Ottawa Senators	37–33–12	L

Legend: W Win (2 points) L Loss (0 points) T Tie (1 point)

== Player statistics ==
=== Scoring ===
- Position abbreviations: C = Center; D = Defense; G = Goaltender; LW = Left wing; RW = Right wing
- † = Joined team via a transaction (e.g., trade, waivers, signing) during the season. Stats reflect time with the Devils only.
- ‡ = Left team via a transaction (e.g., trade, waivers, release) during the season. Stats reflect time with the Devils only.

No.	Player	Pos	Regular season					
No.	Player	Pos	GP	G	A	Pts	+/-	PIM
32	Steve Thomas	LW	81	26	35	61	−2	98
12	Bill Guerin	RW	80	23	30	53	7	116
15	John MacLean	RW	76	20	28	48	3	91
17	Petr Sykora	RW	63	18	24	42	7	32
27	Scott Niedermayer	D	79	8	25	33	5	46
44	Stephane Richer	RW	73	20	12	32	−8	30
16	Bobby Holik	C	63	13	17	30	9	58
4	Scott Stevens	D	82	5	23	28	7	100
14	Brian Rolston	C	58	13	11	24	9	8
9	Neal Broten	C	55	7	16	23	−3	14
29	Shawn Chambers	D	64	2	21	23	1	18
21	Randy McKay	RW	76	11	10	21	7	145
6	Phil Housley†	D	22	1	15	16	−4	8
25	Valeri Zelepukin	LW	61	6	9	15	−10	107
23	Dave Andreychuk†	LW	15	8	5	13	2	10
11	Jim Dowd‡	C	28	4	9	13	−1	17
6	Tommy Albelin‡	D	53	1	12	13	0	14
8	Mike Peluso	LW	57	3	8	11	4	146
19	Bob Carpenter	C	52	5	5	10	−10	14
24	Steve Sullivan	RW	16	5	4	9	3	8
18	Sergei Brylin	LW	50	4	5	9	−2	26
3	Ken Daneyko	D	80	2	4	6	−10	115
33	Reid Simpson	LW	23	1	5	6	2	79
28	Kevin Dean	D	41	0	6	6	4	28
10	Denis Pederson	C	10	3	1	4	−1	0
20	Scott Pellerin	LW	6	2	1	3	1	0
5	Ricard Persson	D	12	2	1	3	5	8
26	Jason Smith	D	64	2	1	3	5	86
10	Esa Tikkanen†‡	LW	9	0	2	2	−6	4
30	Martin Brodeur	G	77	0	1	1		6
11	Jocelyn Lemieux†‡	RW	18	0	1	1	−7	4
24	Patrik Elias	LW	1	0	0	0	−1	0
2	Cale Hulse‡	D	8	0	0	0	−2	15
35	Corey Schwab	G	10	0	0	0		31
31	Chris Terreri‡	G	4	0	0	0		0

=== Goaltending ===
- ‡ = Left team via a transaction (e.g., trade, waivers, release) during the season. Stats reflect time with the Devils only.

No.	Player	Regular season									
No.	Player	GP	W	L	T	SA	GA	GAA	SV%	SO	TOI
30	Martin Brodeur	77	34	30	12	1954	173	2.34	.911	6	4433
35	Chris Terreri‡	4	3	0	0	92	9	2.57	.902	0	210
31	Corey Schwab	10	0	3	0	119	12	2.18	.899	0	331

== Awards and records ==
=== Awards ===
Type	Award/honor	Recipient	Ref
League (annual)	NHL All-Rookie Team	Petr Sykora (Forward)	
League (in-season)	NHL All-Star Game selection	Martin Brodeur (Note: Brodeur and Stevens were voted to the starting lineup.)	
League (in-season)	NHL All-Star Game selection	Scott Stevens	
League (in-season)	NHL Rookie of the Month	Petr Sykora (December)	
Team	Devils' Players' Player	Steve Thomas	
Team	Hugh Delano Unsung Hero	Shawn Chambers	
Team	Most Valuable Devil	Martin Brodeur	
Team	Three-Star Award	Martin Brodeur	

=== Milestones ===
Milestone	Player	Date	Ref
First game	Ricard Persson	October 7, 1995	
First game	Denis Pederson	October 12, 1995	
First game	Petr Sykora	October 28, 1995	
First game	Corey Schwab	November 18, 1995	
First game	Cale Hulse	December 6, 1995	
First game	Patrik Elias	December 7, 1995	
First game	Steve Sullivan	February 23, 1996	
1,000th game played	Scott Stevens	January 9, 1996	
1,000th point	Dave Andreychuk	April 7, 1996	
1,000th game played	Dave Andreychuk	April 11, 1996	

== Draft picks ==
New Jersey's picks at the 1995 NHL entry draft, held in Edmonton, Alberta, Canada, at Edmonton Coliseum.

Rd #	Pick #	Player	Nat	Pos	Team (league)	Notes
1	18	Petr Sykora	Czech Republic	C	Detroit Vipers (IHL)	
2	44	Nathan Perrott	Canada	RW	Oshawa Generals (OHL)	
3	70	Sergei Vyshedkevich	Russia	D	Dynamo Moscow (RSL)	
3	78	David Gosselin	Canada	LW	Sherbrooke Faucons (QMJHL)	(Note: The Devils acquired the 1995 third-round pick from Detroit for Viacheslav Fetisov on April 3, 1995.)
4	79	Alyn McCauley	Canada	C	Ottawa 67's (OHL)	(Note: The Devils acquired the 1995 fourth-round pick from Ottawa for Jaroslav Modry on July 8, 1995. The official Devils transaction page incorrectly lists McCauley's pick as the fifth round.)
4	96	Henrik Rehnberg	Sweden	D	Färjestad BK Jrs. (Elitserien)	
5	122	Chris Mason	Canada	G	Prince George Cougars (WHL)	
6	148	Adam Young	Canada	LW	Windsor Spitfires (OHL)	
7	174	Richard Rochefort	Canada	C	Sudbury Wolves (OHL)	
8	200	Frederic Henry	Canada	G	Granby Bisons (QMJHL)	
9	226	Colin O'Hara	Canada	D	Winnipeg Saints (MJHL)	

== See also ==
- 1995–96 NHL season
