= 1995–96 New York Rangers season =

NHL hockey team season

1995–96 New York Rangers
- Division: 2nd Atlantic
- Conference: 3rd Eastern
- 1995–96 record: 41–27–14
- Home record: 22–10–9
- Road record: 19–17–5
- Goals for: 272
- Goals against: 237

Team information
- General manager: Neil Smith
- Coach: Colin Campbell
- Captain: Mark Messier
- Alternate captains: Adam Graves; Brian Leetch
- Arena: Madison Square Garden
- Average attendance: 18,200
- Minor league affiliate: Binghamton Rangers

Team leaders
- Goals: Mark Messier (47)
- Assists: Brian Leetch (70)
- Points: Mark Messier (99)
- Penalty minutes: Jeff Beukeboom (220)
- Plus/minus: Mark Messier (+29); Pat Verbeek (+29)
- Wins: Mike Richter (24)
- Goals against average: Mike Richter (2.68)

The 1995–96 New York Rangers season was the franchise's 70th season. During the regular season, the Rangers posted a 41–27–14 record, which placed them second in the Atlantic Division and gave them a berth in the 1996 Stanley Cup playoffs. In the first round of the playoffs, New York defeated the Montreal Canadiens in six games to advance to the Eastern Conference Semifinals, where the team lost to the Pittsburgh Penguins in five games.

== Regular season ==
The Rangers were shorthanded a league-high 495 times during the regular season, and tied the Ottawa Senators and Tampa Bay Lightning for fewest short-handed goals scored (6).

=== Final standings ===
Atlantic Division
No.		GP	W	L	T	GF	GA	Pts
1	**Philadelphia Flyers**	82	45	24	13	282	208	103
2	**New York Rangers**	82	41	27	14	272	237	96
3	**Florida Panthers**	82	41	31	10	254	234	92
4	**Washington Capitals**	82	39	32	11	234	204	89
5	**Tampa Bay Lightning**	82	38	32	12	238	248	88
6	New Jersey Devils	82	37	33	12	215	202	86
7	New York Islanders	82	22	50	10	229	315	54

Eastern Conference
R		Div	GP	W	L	T	GF	GA	Pts
**1**	**Philadelphia Flyers**	**ATL**	**82**	**45**	**24**	**13**	**282**	**208**	**103**
**2**	**Pittsburgh Penguins**	**NE**	**82**	**49**	**29**	**4**	**362**	**284**	**102**
**3**	**New York Rangers**	**ATL**	**82**	**41**	**27**	**14**	**272**	**237**	**96**
**4**	**Florida Panthers**	**ATL**	**82**	**41**	**31**	**10**	**254**	**234**	**92**
**5**	**Boston Bruins**	**NE**	**82**	**40**	**31**	**11**	**282**	**269**	**91**
**6**	**Montreal Canadiens**	**NE**	**82**	**40**	**32**	**10**	**265**	**248**	**90**
**7**	**Washington Capitals**	**ATL**	**82**	**39**	**32**	**11**	**234**	**204**	**89**
**8**	**Tampa Bay Lightning**	**ATL**	**82**	**38**	**32**	**12**	**238**	**248**	**88**
9	New Jersey Devils	ATL	82	37	33	12	215	202	86
10	Hartford Whalers	NE	82	34	39	9	237	259	77
11	Buffalo Sabres	NE	82	33	42	7	247	262	73
12	New York Islanders	ATL	82	22	50	10	229	315	54
13	Ottawa Senators	NE	82	18	59	5	191	291	41

Divisions: ATL – Atlantic, NE – Northeast

bold – Qualified for playoffs

== Schedule and results ==
=== Regular season ===
1995–96 regular season
October: 7–3–1 (home: 3–2–0; road: 4–1–1)

Game	Date	Opponent	Score	Record	Recap
1	October 7, 1995	@ Hartford Whalers	2–0	0–1–0	L
2	October 11, 1995	Winnipeg Jets	6–4	1–1–0	W
3	October 14, 1995	@ Toronto Maple Leafs	2–0	2–1–0	W
4	October 16, 1995	Hartford Whalers	7–5	2–2–0	L
5	October 17, 1995	@ New York Islanders	5–1	3–2–0	W
6	October 20, 1995	@ Buffalo Sabres	3–1	4–2–0	W
7	October 22, 1995	Ottawa Senators	4–2	4–3–0	L
8	October 24, 1995	Vancouver Canucks	5–2	5–3–0	W
9	October 26, 1995	@ Tampa Bay Lightning	4–4 OT	5–3–1	T
10	October 29, 1995	Toronto Maple Leafs	3–2	6–3–1	W
11	October 31, 1995	@ San Jose Sharks	5–3	7–3–1	W

November: 7–5–2 (home: 5–0–1; road: 2–5–1)

Game	Date	Opponent	Score	Record	Recap
12	November 2, 1995	@ Los Angeles Kings	5–3	7–4–1	L
13	November 3, 1995	@ Mighty Ducks of Anaheim	7–4	7–5–1	L
14	November 6, 1995	Calgary Flames	4–2	8–5–1	W
15	November 8, 1995	Tampa Bay Lightning	5–4	9–5–1	W
16	November 10, 1995	New York Islanders	4–1	10–5–1	W
17	November 11, 1995	@ Hartford Whalers	4–1	11–5–1	W
18	November 14, 1995	@ St. Louis Blues	1–1 OT	11–5–2	T
19	November 16, 1995	@ Chicago Blackhawks	3–1	11–6–2	L
20	November 17, 1995	@ Winnipeg Jets	6–3	11–7–2	L
21	November 21, 1995	Pittsburgh Penguins	9–4	12–7–2	W
22	November 22, 1995	@ Pittsburgh Penguins	4–3	13–7–2	W
23	November 25, 1995	@ Detroit Red Wings	2–0	13–8–2	L
24	November 27, 1995	New Jersey Devils	1–1 OT	13–8–3	T
25	November 29, 1995	Buffalo Sabres	5–3	14–8–3	W

December: 11–3–3 (home: 7–0–2; road: 4–3–1)

Game	Date	Opponent	Score	Record	Recap
26	December 1, 1995	Colorado Avalanche	5–3	15–8–3	W
27	December 2, 1995	@ Ottawa Senators	4–2	16–8–3	W
28	December 4, 1995	Mighty Ducks of Anaheim	5–1	17–8–3	W
29	December 6, 1995	Chicago Blackhawks	5–5 OT	17–8–4	T
30	December 8, 1995	Detroit Red Wings	2–1 OT	18–8–4	W
31	December 9, 1995	@ Montreal Canadiens	2–2 OT	18–8–5	T
32	December 11, 1995	Dallas Stars	3–2	19–8–5	W
33	December 13, 1995	Boston Bruins	4–2	20–8–5	W
34	December 15, 1995	@ Buffalo Sabres	5–4	20–9–5	L
35	December 16, 1995	@ Washington Capitals	3–2	20–10–5	L
36	December 18, 1995	Washington Capitals	3–0	21–10–5	W
37	December 21, 1995	@ Philadelphia Flyers	2–1	22–10–5	W
38	December 22, 1995	Hartford Whalers	3–3 OT	22–10–6	T
39	December 26, 1995	Ottawa Senators	6–4	23–10–6	W
40	December 28, 1995	@ Vancouver Canucks	3–2	24–10–6	W
41	December 30, 1995	@ Edmonton Oilers	8–3	25–10–6	W
42	December 31, 1995	@ Calgary Flames	3–1	25–11–6	L

January: 5–0–4 (home: 3–0–2; road: 2–0–2)

Game	Date	Opponent	Score	Record	Recap
43	January 3, 1996	Montreal Canadiens	7–4	26–11–6	W
44	January 5, 1996	@ Washington Capitals	4–4 OT	26–11–7	T
45	January 10, 1996	San Jose Sharks	7–4	27–11–7	W
46	January 13, 1996	@ Philadelphia Flyers	4–0	28–11–7	W
47	January 14, 1996	St. Louis Blues	3–3 OT	28–11–8	T
48	January 22, 1996	Los Angeles Kings	3–1	29–11–8	W
49	January 24, 1996	Philadelphia Flyers	4–4 OT	29–11–9	T
50	January 27, 1996	@ Boston Bruins	5–3	30–11–9	W
51	January 31, 1996	@ Dallas Stars	1–1 OT	30–11–10	T

February: 5–6–1 (home: 1–3–1; road: 4–3–0)

Game	Date	Opponent	Score	Record	Recap
52	February 3, 1996	@ Colorado Avalanche	7–1	30–12–10	L
53	February 6, 1996	@ New York Islanders	4–2	31–12–10	W
54	February 8, 1996	New York Islanders	6–2	32–12–10	W
55	February 10, 1996	@ New Jersey Devils	3–0	32–13–10	L
56	February 11, 1996	@ Tampa Bay Lightning	6–2	33–13–10	W
57	February 15, 1996	Montreal Canadiens	2–2 OT	33–13–11	T
58	February 17, 1996	@ Ottawa Senators	2–1 OT	34–13–11	W
59	February 18, 1996	@ Pittsburgh Penguins	4–3 OT	34–14–11	L
60	February 22, 1996	New York Islanders	5–3	34–15–11	L
61	February 24, 1996	@ Florida Panthers	4–0	35–15–11	W
62	February 27, 1996	Washington Capitals	5–3	35–16–11	L
63	February 28, 1996	Boston Bruins	3–1	35–17–11	L

March: 4–4–3 (home: 1–2–3; road: 3–2–0)

Game	Date	Opponent	Score	Record	Recap
64	March 1, 1996	Buffalo Sabres	3–3 OT	35–17–12	T
65	March 4, 1996	New Jersey Devils	2–2 OT	35–17–13	T
66	March 7, 1996	@ Tampa Bay Lightning	5–2	35–18–13	L
67	March 9, 1996	@ Washington Capitals	6–1	36–18–13	W
68	March 13, 1996	Florida Panthers	3–3 OT	36–18–14	T
69	March 16, 1996	@ Montreal Canadiens	4–2	36–19–14	L
70	March 19, 1996	Edmonton Oilers	4–1	36–20–14	L
71	March 23, 1996	@ Boston Bruins	5–4	37–20–14	W
72	March 24, 1996	Pittsburgh Penguins	8–2	37–21–14	L
73	March 27, 1996	Florida Panthers	3–0	38–21–14	W
74	March 31, 1996	@ New York Islanders	4–1	39–21–14	W

April: 2–6–0 (home: 2–3–0; road: 0–3–0)

Game	Date	Opponent	Score	Record	Recap
75	April 2, 1996	New Jersey Devils	3–1	40–21–14	W
76	April 4, 1996	@ Philadelphia Flyers	4–1	40–22–14	L
77	April 5, 1996	Philadelphia Flyers	3–1	41–22–14	W
78	April 7, 1996	@ New Jersey Devils	4–2	41–23–14	L
79	April 8, 1996	Florida Panthers	5–3	41–24–14	L
80	April 10, 1996	Washington Capitals	4–1	41–25–14	L
81	April 12, 1996	Tampa Bay Lightning	3–2	41–26–14	L
82	April 14, 1996	@ Florida Panthers	5–1	41–27–14	L

Legend: W Win (2 points) L Loss (0 points) T Tie (1 point)

=== Playoffs ===
1996 Stanley Cup playoffs
Eastern Conference Quarterfinals vs. (6) Montreal Canadiens – Rangers win 4–2

Game	Date	Opponent	Score	Series	Recap
1	April 16, 1996	Montreal Canadiens	3–2 OT	Canadiens lead 1–0	L
2	April 18, 1996	Montreal Canadiens	5–3	Canadiens lead 2–0	L
3	April 21, 1996	@ Montreal Canadiens	2–1	Canadiens lead 2–1	W
4	April 23, 1996	@ Montreal Canadiens	4–3	Series tied 2–2	W
5	April 26, 1996	Montreal Canadiens	3–2	Rangers lead 3–2	W
6	April 28, 1996	@ Montreal Canadiens	5–3	Rangers win 4–2	W

Eastern Conference Semifinals vs. (2) Pittsburgh Penguins – Penguins win 4–1

Game	Date	Opponent	Score	Series	Recap
1	May 3, 1996	@ Pittsburgh Penguins	4–1	Penguins lead 1–0	L
2	May 5, 1996	@ Pittsburgh Penguins	6–3	Series tied 1–1	W
3	May 7, 1996	Pittsburgh Penguins	3–2	Penguins lead 2–1	L
4	May 9, 1996	Pittsburgh Penguins	4–1	Penguins lead 3–1	L
5	May 11, 1996	@ Pittsburgh Penguins	7–3	Penguins win 4–1	L

Legend: W Win L Loss

== Player statistics ==
=== Scoring ===
- Position abbreviations: C = Center; D = Defense; G = Goaltender; LW = Left wing; RW = Right wing
- † = Joined team via a transaction (e.g., trade, waivers, signing) during the season. Stats reflect time with the Rangers only.
- ‡ = Left team via a transaction (e.g., trade, waivers, release) during the season. Stats reflect time with the Rangers only.

No.	Player	Pos	Regular season						Playoffs					
No.	Player	Pos	GP	G	A	Pts	+/-	PIM	GP	G	A	Pts	+/-	PIM
11	Mark Messier	C	74	47	52	99	29	122	11	4	7	11	−10	16
2	Brian Leetch	D	82	15	70	85	12	30	11	1	6	7	−11	4
16	Pat Verbeek	RW	69	41	41	82	29	129	11	3	6	9	−8	12
20	Luc Robitaille	LW	77	23	46	69	13	80	11	1	5	6	1	8
27	Alexei Kovalev	RW	81	24	34	58	5	98	11	3	4	7	0	14
9	Adam Graves	LW	82	22	36	58	18	100	10	7	1	8	−9	4
21	Ray Ferraro‡	C	65	25	29	54	13	82	—	—	—	—	—	—
33	Bruce Driver	D	66	3	34	37	2	42	11	0	7	7	1	4
13	Sergei Nemchinov	C	78	17	15	32	9	38	6	0	1	1	2	2
24	Niklas Sundstrom	C	82	9	12	21	2	14	11	4	3	7	1	4
5	Ulf Samuelsson	D	74	1	18	19	9	122	11	1	5	6	−1	16
25	Alexander Karpovtsev	D	40	2	16	18	12	26	6	0	1	1	−2	4
6	Doug Lidster	D	59	5	9	14	11	50	7	1	0	1	−4	6
23	Jeff Beukeboom	D	82	3	11	14	19	220	11	0	3	3	−1	6
15	Darren Langdon	LW	64	7	4	11	2	175	2	0	0	0	0	0
18	Wayne Presley‡	RW	61	4	6	10	7	71	—	—	—	—	—	—
32	Sergio Momesso†	LW	19	4	4	8	−2	30	11	3	1	4	0	14
19	Nick Kypreos‡	LW	42	3	4	7	1	77	—	—	—	—	—	—
32	Stephane Matteau‡	LW	32	4	2	6	−4	22	—	—	—	—	—	—
4	Kevin Lowe	D	53	1	5	6	20	76	10	0	4	4	5	4
12	Ken Gernander	RW	10	2	3	5	−3	4	6	0	0	0	0	0
17	Jari Kurri†	RW	14	1	4	5	−4	2	11	3	5	8	−2	2
37	Daniel Lacroix	LW	25	2	2	4	−1	30	—	—	—	—	—	—
18	Bill Berg†	LW	18	2	1	3	0	8	10	1	0	1	−1	0
14	Mattias Norstrom‡	D	25	2	1	3	5	22	—	—	—	—	—	—
26	Joe Kocur‡	RW	38	1	2	3	−4	49	—	—	—	—	—	—
22	Ian Laperriere†‡	C	28	1	2	3	−5	53	—	—	—	—	—	—
55 (Note: McSorley wore number 36 in his first game.)	Marty McSorley†	D	9	0	2	2	−6	21	4	0	0	0	−1	0
14	Chris Ferraro	RW	2	1	0	1	−3	0	—	—	—	—	—	—
21 (Note: Ferraro wore number 17 in his first three games.)	Peter Ferraro	C	5	0	1	1	−5	0	—	—	—	—	—	—
30	Glenn Healy	G	44	0	1	1		8	—	—	—	—	—	—
29	Barry Richter	D	4	0	1	1	2	0	—	—	—	—	—	—
35	Mike Richter	G	41	0	1	1		4	11	0	0	0		0
22	Shane Churla†	RW	10	0	0	0	−3	26	11	2	2	4	−2	14
22	Nathan LaFayette‡	C	5	0	0	0	−1	2	—	—	—	—	—	—
39	Steve Larouche‡	C	1	0	0	0	0	0	—	—	—	—	—	—
34	Jamie Ram	G	1	0	0	0		0	—	—	—	—	—	—

=== Goaltending ===
No.	Player	Regular season										Playoffs								
No.	Player	GP	W	L	T	SA	GA	GAA	SV%	SO	TOI	GP	W	L	SA	GA	GAA	SV%	SO	TOI
35	Mike Richter	41	24	13	3	1221	107	2.68	.912	3	2396	11	5	6	308	36	3.27	.883	0	661
30	Glenn Healy	44	17	14	11	1237	124	2.90	.900	2	2564	—	—	—	—	—	—	—	—	—
34	Jamie Ram	1	0	0	0	9	0	0.00	1.000	0	27	—	—	—	—	—	—	—	—	—

== Awards and records ==
=== Awards ===
Type	Award/honor	Recipient	Ref
League (annual)	NHL Second All-Star team	Brian Leetch (Defense)	
League (in-season)	NHL All-Star Game selection	Brian Leetch	
League (in-season)	NHL All-Star Game selection	Mark Messier	
League (in-season)	NHL All-Star Game selection	Pat Verbeek	
Team	Ceil Saidel Memorial Award	Adam Graves	
Team	Ceil Saidel Memorial Award	Glenn Healy	
Team	"Crumb Bum" Award	Jeff Beukeboom	
Team	Frank Boucher Trophy	Mark Messier	
Team	Good Guy Award	Glenn Healy	
Team	Lars-Erik Sjoberg Award	Niklas Sundstrom	
Team	Players' Player Award	Mark Messier	
Team	Rangers MVP	Mark Messier	
Team	Steven McDonald Extra Effort Award	Mark Messier	

=== Milestones ===
Milestone	Player	Date	Ref
First game	Niklas Sundstrom	October 7, 1995	
First game	Peter Ferraro	October 16, 1995	
First game	Jamie Ram	February 3, 1996	
First game	Ken Gernander	March 9, 1996	
First game	Barry Richter	April 5, 1996	
First game	Chris Ferraro	April 8, 1996	
400th goal	Pat Verbeek	January 10, 1996	

== Transactions ==
- July 31, 1995 – Doug Lidster was traded by the St. Louis Blues to the New York Rangers in exchange for Jay Wells.

== Draft picks ==
New York's picks at the 1995 NHL entry draft in Edmonton, Alberta, at the Edmonton Coliseum.

Round	#	Player	Position	Nationality	College/Junior/Club team (League)
2	39	Christian Dube	RW	Canada	Sherbrooke Faucons (QMJHL)
3	65	Mike Martin	D	Canada	Windsor Spitfires (OHL)
4	91	Marc Savard	C	Canada	Oshawa Generals (OHL)
5	110	Alexei Vasiliev	D	Russia	Yaroslavl Torpedo (Russia)
5	117	Dale Purinton	D	United States	Tacoma Rockets (WHL)
6	143	Peter Slamiar	RW	Slovakia	Zvolen Jrs. (Slovak Extraliga)
7	169	Jeff Heil	G	United States	University of Wisconsin–River Falls (NCAA)
8	195	Ilya Gorokhov	D	Russia	Yaroslavl Torpedo (Russia)
9	221	Bob Maudie	C	Canada	Kamloops Blazers (WHL)

== See also ==
- 1995–96 NHL season
