= 1995–96 Mighty Ducks of Anaheim season =

NHL team season

1995–96 Mighty Ducks of Anaheim
- Division: 4th Pacific
- Conference: 9th Western
- 1995–96 record: 35–39–8
- Home record: 22–15–4
- Road record: 13–24–4
- Goals for: 234
- Goals against: 247

Team information
- General manager: Jack Ferreira
- Coach: Ron Wilson
- Captain: Randy Ladouceur
- Alternate captains: Bobby Dollas; Todd Ewen; Paul Kariya
- Arena: Arrowhead Pond of Anaheim
- Average attendance: 17,154 (99.8%); Total: 703,347
- Minor league affiliates: Baltimore Bandits (AHL); Raleigh IceCaps (ECHL)

Team leaders
- Goals: Paul Kariya (50)
- Assists: Paul Kariya (58)
- Points: Paul Kariya (108)
- Penalty minutes: Todd Ewen (285)
- Plus/minus: Shaun Van Allen (+13)
- Wins: Guy Hebert (28)
- Goals against average: Guy Hebert (2.83)

The 1995–96 Mighty Ducks of Anaheim season was the third season in franchise history. For the third straight year, Anaheim did not qualify for the playoffs.

== Regular season ==
The Mighty Ducks allowed the fewest short-handed goals during the regular season (5).

=== Final standings ===
Pacific Division
No.		GP	W	L	T	GF	GA	Pts
1	**Colorado Avalanche**	82	47	25	10	326	240	104
2	**Calgary Flames**	82	34	37	11	241	240	79
3	**Vancouver Canucks**	82	32	35	15	278	278	79
4	Mighty Ducks of Anaheim	82	35	39	8	234	247	78
5	Edmonton Oilers	82	30	44	8	240	304	68
6	Los Angeles Kings	82	24	40	18	256	302	66
7	San Jose Sharks	82	20	55	7	252	357	47

Note: GP = Games played; W = Wins; L = Losses; T = Ties; GF = Goals for; GA = Goals against; Pts = Points
Bolded teams qualified for the playoffs.

Western Conference
R		Div	GP	W	L	T	GF	GA	Pts
**1**	**p – Detroit Red Wings**	**CEN**	**82**	**62**	**13**	**7**	**325**	**181**	**131**
**2**	**Colorado Avalanche**	**PAC**	**82**	**47**	**25**	**10**	**326**	**240**	**104**
**3**	**Chicago Blackhawks**	**CEN**	**82**	**40**	**28**	**14**	**273**	**220**	**94**
**4**	**Toronto Maple Leafs**	**CEN**	**82**	**34**	**36**	**12**	**247**	**252**	**80**
**5**	**St. Louis Blues**	**CEN**	**82**	**32**	**34**	**16**	**219**	**248**	**80**
**6**	**Calgary Flames**	**PAC**	**82**	**34**	**37**	**11**	**241**	**240**	**79**
**7**	**Vancouver Canucks**	**PAC**	**82**	**32**	**35**	**15**	**278**	**278**	**79**
**8**	**Winnipeg Jets**	**CEN**	**82**	**36**	**40**	**6**	**275**	**291**	**78**
9	Mighty Ducks of Anaheim	PAC	82	35	39	8	234	247	78
10	Edmonton Oilers	PAC	82	30	44	8	240	304	68
11	Dallas Stars	CEN	82	26	42	14	227	280	66
12	Los Angeles Kings	PAC	82	24	40	18	256	302	66
13	San Jose Sharks	PAC	82	20	55	7	252	357	47

Divisions: CEN – Central, PAC – Pacific

bold – Qualified for playoffs; p – Won Presidents' Trophy

== Schedule and results ==
1995–96 regular season
October: 3–8–0 (home: 2–2–0; road: 1–6–0)

Game	Date	Visitor	Score	Home	OT	Decision	Record	Points	Recap
1	October 9	Anaheim	3–4	Winnipeg		Hebert	0–1–0	0	L
2	October 11	Anaheim	2–3	Hartford		Hebert	0–2–0	0	L
3	October 13	Anaheim	4–1	Buffalo		Shtalenkov	1–2–0	2	W
4	October 14	Anaheim	2–5	Pittsburgh		Hebert	1–3–0	2	L
5	October 18	Vancouver	5–1	Anaheim		Shtalenkov	1–4–0	2	L
6	October 20	Philadelphia	4–2	Anaheim		Hebert	1–5–0	2	L
7	October 22	Winnipeg	2–6	Anaheim		Hebert	2–5–0	4	W
8	October 23	Anaheim	1–3	Colorado		Hebert	2–6–0	4	L
9	October 26	Anaheim	2–5	Dallas		Shtalenkov	2–7–0	4	L
10	October 27	Anaheim	2–4	St. Louis		Hebert	2–8–0	4	L
11	October 29	Calgary	2–7	Anaheim		Hebert	3–8–0	6	W

November: 8–5–1 (home: 5–3–1; road: 3–2–0)

Game	Date	Visitor	Score	Home	OT	Decision	Record	Points	Recap
12	November 1	St. Louis	0–3	Anaheim		Hebert	4–8–0	8	W
13	November 3	NY Rangers	4–7	Anaheim		Hebert	5–8–0	10	W
14	November 5	New Jersey	1–6	Anaheim		Hebert	6–8–0	12	W
15	November 7	Anaheim	3–6	Toronto		Hebert	6–9–0	12	L
16	November 8	Anaheim	3–2	Montreal	OT	Hebert	7–9–0	14	W
17	November 11	Anaheim	3–2	Ottawa		Hebert	8–9–0	16	W
18	November 13	Los Angeles	4–2	Anaheim		Hebert	8–10–0	16	L
19	November 15	Colorado	3–7	Anaheim		Shtalenkov	9–10–0	18	W
20	November 17	NY Islanders	1–2	Anaheim	OT	Hebert	10–10–0	20	W
21	November 19	Florida	4–3	Anaheim		Hebert	10–11–0	20	L
22	November 21	Anaheim	3–2	Calgary		Hebert	11–11–0	22	W
23	November 22	Anaheim	0–2	Edmonton		Shtalenkov	11–12–0	22	L
24	November 24	Chicago	5–4	Anaheim	OT	Hebert	11–13–0	22	L
25	November 29	Washington	2–2	Anaheim	OT	Shtalenkov	11–13–1	23	T

December: 3–9–3 (home: 3–5–1; road: 0–4–2)

Game	Date	Visitor	Score	Home	OT	Decision	Record	Points	Recap
26	December 1	Anaheim	2–5	Detroit		Shtalenkov	11–14–1	23	L
27	December 2	Anaheim	4–4	Toronto	OT	Shtalenkov	11–14–2	24	T
28	December 4	Anaheim	1–5	NY Rangers		Shtalenkov	11–15–2	24	L
29	December 6	Anaheim	1–2	Tampa Bay		Hebert	11–16–2	24	L
30	December 7	Anaheim	3–3	Florida	OT	Hebert	11–16–3	25	T
31	December 10	Edmonton	3–1	Anaheim		Shtalenkov	11–17–3	25	L
32	December 13	Pittsburgh	3–6	Anaheim		Shtalenkov	12–17–3	27	W
33	December 15	Ottawa	2–4	Anaheim		Shtalenkov	13–17–3	29	W
34	December 17	Toronto	3–2	Anaheim	OT	Shtalenkov	13–18–3	29	L
35	December 19	San Jose	7–4	Anaheim		Shtalenkov	13–19–3	29	L
36	December 20	Detroit	6–1	Anaheim		Hebert	13–20–3	29	L
37	December 22	Vancouver	6–2	Anaheim		Shtalenkov	13–21–3	29	L
38	December 27	Anaheim	1–7	Los Angeles		Shtalenkov	13–22–3	29	L
39	December 29	San Jose	2–4	Anaheim		Hebert	14–22–3	31	W
40	December 31	Los Angeles	2–2	Anaheim	OT	Hebert	14–22–4	32	T

January: 4–5–1 (home: 1–1–0; road: 3–4–1)

Game	Date	Visitor	Score	Home	OT	Decision	Record	Points	Recap
41	January 5	Anaheim	3–1	Calgary		Hebert	15–22–4	34	W
42	January 7	Anaheim	1–3	Edmonton		Hebert	15–23–4	34	L
43	January 9	Anaheim	2–2	Philadelphia	OT	Hebert	15–23–5	35	T
44	January 11	Anaheim	2–7	Boston		Hebert	15–24–5	35	L
45	January 12	Anaheim	0–3	Chicago		Hebert	15–25–5	35	L
46	January 14	Anaheim	6–4	Winnipeg		Hebert	16–25–5	37	W
47	January 17	Calgary	4–1	Anaheim		Hebert	16–26–5	37	L
48	January 24	Anaheim	2–1	Vancouver	OT	Hebert	17–26–5	39	W
49	January 27	Anaheim	4–5	Los Angeles		Hebert	17–27–5	39	L
50	January 31	Colorado	1–2	Anaheim		Hebert	18–27–5	41	W

February: 5–8–0 (home: 3–3–0; road: 2–5–0)

Game	Date	Visitor	Score	Home	OT	Decision	Record	Points	Recap
51	February 2	Hartford	4–3	Anaheim		Hebert	18–28–5	41	L
52	February 4	Chicago	4–1	Anaheim		Hebert	18–29–5	41	L
53	February 7	Toronto	2–1	Anaheim		Shtalenkov	18–30–5	41	L
54	February 10	Anaheim	3–4	NY Islanders		Shtalenkov	18–31–5	41	L
55	February 11	Anaheim	4–2	New Jersey		Hebert	19–31–5	43	W
56	February 14	Anaheim	2–3	Edmonton		Hebert	19–32–5	43	L
57	February 15	Anaheim	3–5	Vancouver		Shtalenkov	19–33–5	43	L
58	February 17	Anaheim	2–1	Los Angeles	OT	Shtalenkov	20–33–5	45	W
59	February 21	Boston	3–4	Anaheim	OT	Shtalenkov	21–33–5	47	W
60	February 23	Anaheim	2–3	Calgary		Shtalenkov	21–34–5	47	L
61	February 25	San Jose	3–4	Anaheim		Hebert	22–34–5	49	W
62	February 26	Anaheim	2–3	Colorado		Shtalenkov	22–35–5	49	L
63	February 28	Montreal	2–5	Anaheim		Shtalenkov	23–35–5	51	W

March: 7–3–2 (home: 4–1–1; road: 3–2–1)

Game	Date	Visitor	Score	Home	OT	Decision	Record	Points	Recap
64	March 3	Tampa Bay	2–2	Anaheim	OT	Shtalenkov	23–35–6	52	T
65	March 5	Dallas	3–1	Anaheim		Shtalenkov	23–36–6	52	L
66	March 8	Buffalo	2–3	Anaheim	OT	Hebert	24–36–6	54	W
67	March 10	Los Angeles	2–3	Anaheim		Hebert	25–36–6	56	W
68	March 13	Colorado	0–4	Anaheim		Hebert	26–36–6	58	W
69	March 17	St. Louis	1–5	Anaheim		Hebert	27–36–6	60	W
70	March 19	Anaheim	2–1	Washington		Hebert	28–36–6	62	W
71	March 22	Anaheim	6–1	St. Louis		Hebert	29–36–6	64	W
72	March 24	Anaheim	2–2	Chicago		Hebert	29–36–7	65	T
73	March 25	Anaheim	1–5	Detroit		Hebert	29–37–7	65	L
74	March 28	Anaheim	1–3	Dallas		Hebert	29–38–7	65	L
75	March 31	Anaheim	4–2	San Jose		Hebert	30–38–7	67	W

April: 5–1–1 (home: 4–0–1; road: 1–1–0)

Game	Date	Visitor	Score	Home	OT	Decision	Record	Points	Recap
76	April 3	Edmonton	0–1	Anaheim		Hebert	31–38–7	69	W
77	April 5	Detroit	2–2	Anaheim	OT	Hebert	31–38–8	70	T
78	April 7	Anaheim	5–3	San Jose		Hebert	32–38–8	72	W
79	April 8	Vancouver	0–2	Anaheim		Hebert	33–38–8	74	W
80	April 10	Anaheim	3–7	Colorado		Hebert	33–39–8	74	L
81	April 12	Dallas	3–5	Anaheim		Hebert	34–39–8	76	W
82	April 14	Winnipeg	2–5	Anaheim		Hebert	35–39–8	78	W

Legend: W Win (2 points) L Loss (0 points) T Tie (1 point)

== Player statistics ==
=== Scoring ===
- Position abbreviations: C = Center; D = Defense; G = Goaltender; LW = Left wing; RW = Right wing
- † = Joined team via a transaction (e.g., trade, waivers, signing) during the season. Stats reflect time with the Mighty Ducks only.
- ‡ = Left team via a transaction (e.g., trade, waivers, release) during the season. Stats reflect time with the Mighty Ducks only.

No.	Player	Pos	Regular season					
No.	Player	Pos	GP	G	A	Pts	+/-	PIM
9	Paul Kariya	LW	82	50	58	108	9	20
20	Steve Rucchin	C	64	19	25	44	3	12
25	Todd Krygier‡	LW	60	9	28	37	−9	70
8	Teemu Selanne†	RW	28	16	20	36	2	4
26	Mike Sillinger‡	RW	62	13	21	34	−20	32
2	Bobby Dollas	D	82	8	22	30	9	64
14	Joe Sacco	RW	76	13	14	27	1	40
22	Shaun Van Allen	C	49	8	17	25	13	41
18	Garry Valk	LW	79	12	12	24	8	125
3	Jason York	D	79	3	21	24	−7	88
10	Oleg Tverdovsky‡	D	51	7	15	22	0	35
32	Alex Hicks	C	64	10	11	21	11	37
17	Dave Karpa	D	72	3	16	19	−3	270
21	Patrik Carnback	RW	34	6	12	18	3	34
4	Fredrik Olausson†	D	36	2	16	18	7	24
11	Valeri Karpov	LW	37	9	8	17	−1	10
16	Peter Douris	RW	31	8	7	15	−3	9
12	David Sacco	LW	23	4	10	14	1	18
46	Jean-Francois Jomphe	RW	31	2	12	14	7	39
28	Roman Oksiuta†	RW	14	7	5	12	2	18
19	Bob Corkum‡	C	48	5	7	12	0	26
8	Chad Kilger‡	C	45	5	7	12	−2	22
93	Anatoli Semenov†	C	12	1	9	10	−4	10
42	Denny Lambert	LW	33	0	8	8	−2	55
36	Todd Ewen	RW	53	4	3	7	−5	285
21	Jim Campbell†	C	16	2	3	5	0	36
7	Milos Holan	D	16	2	2	4	−12	24
29	Randy Ladouceur	D	63	1	3	4	5	47
5	Robert Dirk‡	D	44	1	2	3	8	42
48	Darren Van Impe	D	16	1	2	3	8	14
24	Steven King	RW	7	2	0	2	−1	15
35	Mikhail Shtalenkov	G	30	0	2	2		2
15	Vyacheslav Butsayev†	C	7	1	0	1	−4	0
24	Ken Baumgartner†	LW	12	0	1	1	0	41
23	Jason Marshall	D	24	0	1	1	3	42
28	Dwayne Norris†	RW	3	0	1	1	0	2
54	Sean Pronger	C	7	0	1	1	0	6
40	Jeremy Stevenson	LW	3	0	1	1	1	12
31	Guy Hebert	G	59	0	0	0		6
27	John Lilley	C	1	0	0	0	−1	0
6	Don McSween	D	4	0	0	0	0	4
44	Oleg Mikulchik	D	8	0	0	0	−2	4

=== Goaltending ===
No.	Player	Regular season										
No.	Player	GP	GS	W	L	T	SA	GA	GAA	SV%	SO	TOI
31	Guy Hebert	59	58	28	23	5	1,820	157	2.83	.914	4	3,325:55
35	Mikhail Shtalenkov	30	24	7	16	3	814	85	3.12	.896	0	1,637:12

== Awards and records ==
=== Awards ===
Type	Award/honor	Recipient	Ref
League (annual)	Lady Byng Memorial Trophy	Paul Kariya	
League (annual)	NHL First All-Star team	Paul Kariya (Left wing)	
League (in-season)	NHL All-Star Game selection	Paul Kariya	

=== Records ===
- Todd Ewen – Most PIM in a season (285)

=== Milestones ===
Milestone	Player	Date	Ref
First game	Chad Kilger	October 9, 1995	
First game	Alex Hicks	November 15, 1995	
First game	Sean Pronger	November 29, 1995	
First game	Jim Campbell	February 4, 1996	
First game	Jean-Francois Jomphe	February 4, 1996	
First game	Jeremy Stevenson	March 13, 1996	

== Transactions ==
=== Trades ===
Date	Details	
July 8, 1995	To St. Louis Blues 1995 STL 6th-round pick (#153 overall)	To Mighty Ducks of Anaheim 1996 6th-round pick (#149 overall)
October 30, 1995	To Calgary Flames Jarrod Skalde	To Mighty Ducks of Anaheim Bobby Marshall
January 21, 1996	To Montreal Canadiens Robert Dirk	To Mighty Ducks of Anaheim Jim Campbell
February 6, 1996	To Philadelphia Flyers Bob Corkum	To Mighty Ducks of Anaheim Chris Herperger; 1997 PHX 7th-round pick (#178 overall)
February 7, 1996	To Winnipeg Jets Chad Kilger; Oleg Tverdovsky; 1996 3rd-round pick (#64 overall)	To Mighty Ducks of Anaheim Teemu Selanne; Marc Chouinard; 1996 4th-round pick (#92 overall)
March 8, 1996	To Washington Capitals Todd Krygier	To Mighty Ducks of Anaheim Mike Torchia
March 15, 1996	To Vancouver Canucks Mike Sillinger	To Mighty Ducks of Anaheim Roman Oksiuta
March 19, 1996	To Philadelphia Flyers Brian Wesenberg	To Mighty Ducks of Anaheim Anatoli Semenov; Rights to Mike Crowley
March 20, 1996	To Toronto Maple Leafs 1996 PHX 4th-round pick (#92 overall)	To Mighty Ducks of Anaheim Ken Baumgartner

=== Free agents ===
Date	Player	Team
July 10, 1995	Allan Bester	to Orlando Solar Bears (IHL)
July 14, 1995	Mike O'Neill	
August 8, 1995	Oleg Mikulchik	from Winnipeg Jets
August 9, 1995	Tim Sweeney	to Boston Bruins
August 17, 1995	Alex Hicks	
August 25, 1995	David Williams	to Hartford Whalers
August 30, 1995	Myles O'Connor	to Houston Aeros (IHL)
October 19, 1995	Vyacheslav Butsayev	
November 3, 1995	Dwayne Norris	
January 22, 1996	Frank Banham	
May 30, 1996	Dan Trebil	

=== Signings ===
Date	Player	Contract term
September 7, 1995	Todd Ewen	1-year
September 20, 1995	Peter Leboutillier	Multi-year

=== Waivers ===
Date	Player	Team
January 16, 1996	Fredrik Olausson	from Edmonton Oilers

== Draft picks ==
Anaheim's draft picks at the 1995 NHL entry draft held at the Northlands Coliseum in Edmonton, Alberta, Canada.

Round	Pick	Player	Position	Nationality	College/junior/club team
1	4	Chad Kilger	LW	Canada	Kingston Frontenacs (OHL)
2	29	Brian Wesenberg	RW	Canada	Guelph Storm (OHL)
3	55	Mike Leclerc	LW	Canada	Brandon Wheat Kings (WHL)
5	107	Igor Nikulin	RW	Russia	Severstal Cherepovets (Russia)
6	133	Peter Leboutillier	RW	Canada	Red Deer Rebels (WHL)
7	159	Mike LaPlante	D	Canada	Calgary Royals (AJHL)
8	185	Igor Karpenko	G	Ukraine	Sokil Kyiv (Ukraine)

Notes

- The Mighty Ducks fourth-round pick went to the Colorado Avalanche (formerly the Quebec Nordiques) as the result of a trade on February 20, 1994 that sent John Tanner to Anaheim in exchange for this pick (81st overall).
- The Mighty Ducks ninth-round pick went to the New York Islanders as the result of a trade on August 31, 1994 that sent Darren Van Impe to Anaheim in exchange for this pick (211th overall).

== See also ==
- 1995–96 NHL season
