= 1995–96 Hartford Whalers season =

National Hockey League team season

1995–96 Hartford Whalers
- Division: 4th Northeast
- Conference: 10th Eastern
- 1995–96 record: 34–39–9
- Home record: 22–15–4
- Road record: 12–24–5
- Goals for: 237
- Goals against: 259

Team information
- General manager: Jim Rutherford
- Coach: Paul Holmgren (Oct.–Nov.); Paul Maurice (Nov.–Apr.)
- Captain: Brendan Shanahan
- Alternate captains: Glen Wesley; Andrew Cassels
- Arena: Hartford Civic Center
- Average attendance: 11,983 (76.6%)
- Minor league affiliates: Springfield Falcons (AHL); Richmond Renegades (ECHL)

Team leaders
- Goals: Brendan Shanahan (44)
- Assists: Andrew Cassels (43)
- Points: Brendan Shanahan (78)
- Penalty minutes: Scott Daniels (254)
- Plus/minus: Brad McCrimmon (+15)
- Wins: Sean Burke (28)
- Goals against average: Jason Muzzatti (2.90)

The 1995–96 Hartford Whalers season was the 24th season of the franchise, 17th season in the NHL. The Whalers missed the playoffs for the fourth consecutive season.

== Off-season ==
On May 31, the Whalers acquired a fourth round draft pick in the 1995 NHL entry draft from the Los Angeles Kings in exchange for Jan Vopat.

The Whalers participated in the 1995 NHL entry draft held at the Edmonton Coliseum in Edmonton, Alberta on July 8. With their first round selection, 13th overall, Hartford selected Jean-Sebastien Giguere from the Halifax Mooseheads of the Quebec Major Junior Hockey League. Giguere had a record of 14-27-5 with a 3.94 GAA and a .889 save percentage with the Mooseheads during the 1994–95 season. In the fourth round, the club selected Sami Kapanen from HIFK of the SM-liiga. In 49 games, Kapanen scored 14 goals and 42 points. Other notable players the Whalers selected in the draft include Ian MacNeil, Byron Ritchie and Mike Rucinski.

Hartford signed free agent Jeff Daniels on July 18. Daniels played in three games with the Florida Panthers during the 1994–95, earning no points. He played a majority of the season with the Detroit Vipers of the IHL, scoring eight goals and 20 points in 25 games.

On July 27, the Whalers and St. Louis Blues were involved in a blockbuster trade. Hartford acquired Brendan Shanahan from the Blues in exchange for Chris Pronger. In 45 games during the 1994–95 season, Shanahan scored 20 goals and 41 points. Shanahan had back-to-back 50+ goal seasons in 1992–93 and 1993–94. Shanahan was named to the NHL First All-Star Team during the 1993–94 season, as he scored 52 goals and 102 points in 81 games, while accumulating 211 penalty minutes.

The Whalers signed free agent Gerald Diduck on August 24. Diduck split the 1994–95 season between the Vancouver Canucks and Chicago Blackhawks. In 35 games, he scored two goals and five points.

On October 6, the Whalers acquired Nelson Emerson in a trade with the Winnipeg Jets in exchange for Darren Turcotte. In 1994–95, Emerson scored 14 goals and 37 points in 48 games with the Jets. During the 1993–94 season, Emerson scored a career high 33 goals and 74 points in 83 games with Winnipeg. Also, on October 6, at the NHL Waiver Draft, the Whalers selected Jason Muzzatti from the Calgary Flames. Muzzatti had a 10-14-4 record with the Saint John Flames during the 1994–95 season.

== Regular season ==
Against the Hartford Whalers on March 6, 1996, Chris Osgood became the third goaltender in NHL history to score a goal.

The Whalers were shutout a league-high 8 times during the regular season.

=== Final standings ===
Northeast Division
No.		GP	W	L	T	GF	GA	PTS
1	**Pittsburgh Penguins**	82	49	29	4	362	284	102
2	**Boston Bruins**	82	40	31	11	282	269	91
3	**Montreal Canadiens**	82	40	32	10	265	248	90
4	Hartford Whalers	82	34	39	9	237	259	77
5	Buffalo Sabres	82	33	42	7	247	262	72
6	Ottawa Senators	82	18	59	5	191	291	41

Eastern Conference
R		Div	GP	W	L	T	GF	GA	Pts
**1**	**Philadelphia Flyers**	**ATL**	**82**	**45**	**24**	**13**	**282**	**208**	**103**
**2**	**Pittsburgh Penguins**	**NE**	**82**	**49**	**29**	**4**	**362**	**284**	**102**
**3**	**New York Rangers**	**ATL**	**82**	**41**	**27**	**14**	**272**	**237**	**96**
**4**	**Florida Panthers**	**ATL**	**82**	**41**	**31**	**10**	**254**	**234**	**92**
**5**	**Boston Bruins**	**NE**	**82**	**40**	**31**	**11**	**282**	**269**	**91**
**6**	**Montreal Canadiens**	**NE**	**82**	**40**	**32**	**10**	**265**	**248**	**90**
**7**	**Washington Capitals**	**ATL**	**82**	**39**	**32**	**11**	**234**	**204**	**89**
**8**	**Tampa Bay Lightning**	**ATL**	**82**	**38**	**32**	**12**	**238**	**248**	**88**
9	New Jersey Devils	ATL	82	37	33	12	215	202	86
10	Hartford Whalers	NE	82	34	39	9	237	259	77
11	Buffalo Sabres	NE	82	33	42	7	247	262	73
12	New York Islanders	ATL	82	22	50	10	229	315	54
13	Ottawa Senators	NE	82	18	59	5	191	291	41

Divisions: ATL – Atlantic, NE – Northeast

bold – Qualified for playoffs

== Schedule and results ==
1995–96 regular season
October: 4–4–1 (home: 3–2–1; road: 1–2–0)

Game	Date	Score	Opponent	Record	Attendance	Recap
1	October 7, 1995	2–0	New York Rangers (1995–96)	1–0–0	15,635	W
2	October 11, 1995	3–2	Mighty Ducks of Anaheim (1995–96)	2–0–0	8,635	W
3	October 14, 1995	3–2	Chicago Blackhawks (1995–96)	3–0–0	15,500	W
4	October 16, 1995	7–5	@ New York Rangers (1995–96)	4–0–0	18,200	W
5	October 20, 1995	2–2 OT	Pittsburgh Penguins (1995–96)	4–0–1	15,635	T
6	October 21, 1995	0–3	@ Florida Panthers (1995–96)	4–1–1	12,503	L
7	October 25, 1995	2–4	St. Louis Blues (1995–96)	4–2–1	10,527	L
8	October 27, 1995	1–4	Montreal Canadiens (1995–96)	4–3–1	11,157	L
9	October 28, 1995	0–3	@ Boston Bruins (1995–96)	4–4–1	17,565	L

November: 5–7–1 (home: 3–4–0; road: 2–3–1)

Game	Date	Score	Opponent	Record	Attendance	Recap
10	November 2, 1995	0–5	Ottawa Senators (1995–96)	4–5–1	10,458	L
11	November 4, 1995	5–4	@ Ottawa Senators (1995–96)	5–5–1	8,794	W
12	November 5, 1995	1–6	@ Philadelphia Flyers (1995–96)	5–6–1	17,218	L
13	November 7, 1995	7–3	San Jose Sharks (1995–96)	6–6–1	8,628	W
14	November 11, 1995	1–4	New York Rangers (1995–96)	6–7–1	15,635	L
15	November 14, 1995	0–1	@ New Jersey Devils (1995–96)	6–8–1	11,916	L
16	November 15, 1995	3–2	Ottawa Senators (1995–96)	7–8–1	7,641	W
17	November 18, 1995	2–4	Philadelphia Flyers (1995–96)	7–9–1	13,910	L
18	November 20, 1995	3–4 OT	@ Montreal Canadiens (1995–96)	7–10–1	16,312	L
19	November 22, 1995	4–2	Montreal Canadiens (1995–96)	8–10–1	11,642	W
20	November 24, 1995	4–0	@ Toronto Maple Leafs (1995–96)	9–10–1	15,726	W
21	November 25, 1995	2–4	Washington Capitals (1995–96)	9–11–1	13,108	L
22	November 29, 1995	2–2 OT	@ Tampa Bay Lightning (1995–96)	9–11–2	15,203	T

December: 2–10–3 (home: 2–3–1; road: 0–7–2)

Game	Date	Score	Opponent	Record	Attendance	Recap
23	December 1, 1995	1–2	@ Buffalo Sabres (1995–96)	9–12–2	12,036	L
24	December 2, 1995	3–5	Florida Panthers (1995–96)	9–13–2	10,092	L
25	December 6, 1995	7–4	New York Islanders (1995–96)	10–13–2	8,760	W
26	December 9, 1995	0–6	@ Pittsburgh Penguins (1995–96)	10–14–2	16,114	L
27	December 10, 1995	1–4	@ Chicago Blackhawks (1995–96)	10–15–2	17,955	L
28	December 13, 1995	2–3	Tampa Bay Lightning (1995–96)	10–16–2	7,547	L
29	December 15, 1995	4–2	Colorado Avalanche (1995–96)	11–16–2	9,826	W
30	December 16, 1995	3–3 OT	@ New York Islanders (1995–96)	11–16–3	8,251	T
31	December 18, 1995	2–3	@ Montreal Canadiens (1995–96)	11–17–3	16,237	L
32	December 20, 1995	2–3	Calgary Flames (1995–96)	11–18–3	6,563	L
33	December 22, 1995	3–3 OT	@ New York Rangers (1995–96)	11–18–4	18,200	T
34	December 23, 1995	3–3 OT	Philadelphia Flyers (1995–96)	11–18–5	12,262	T
35	December 28, 1995	4–9	@ Pittsburgh Penguins (1995–96)	11–19–5	17,181	L
36	December 30, 1995	0–3	@ Washington Capitals (1995–96)	11–20–5	18,130	L
37	December 31, 1995	2–3	@ Detroit Red Wings (1995–96)	11–21–5	19,983	L

January: 8–4–1 (home: 4–0–1; road: 4–4–0)

Game	Date	Score	Opponent	Record	Attendance	Recap
38	January 3, 1996	2–0	Washington Capitals (1995–96)	12–21–5	8,087	W
39	January 5, 1996	4–2	Ottawa Senators (1995–96)	13–21–5	12,239	W
40	January 6, 1996	2–5	@ Boston Bruins (1995–96)	13–22–5	17,565	L
41	January 9, 1996	5–1	@ Edmonton Oilers (1995–96)	14–22–5	9,702	W
42	January 10, 1996	2–3 OT	@ Calgary Flames (1995–96)	14–23–5	16,469	L
43	January 12, 1996	3–2	@ Winnipeg Jets (1995–96)	15–23–5	9,709	W
44	January 16, 1996	3–0	Vancouver Canucks (1995–96)	16–23–5	11,124	W
45	January 17, 1996	6–3	@ New York Islanders (1995–96)	17–23–5	8,544	W
46	January 24, 1996	2–4	@ Buffalo Sabres (1995–96)	17–24–5	12,808	L
47	January 25, 1996	8–2	Los Angeles Kings (1995–96)	18–24–5	13,757	W
48	January 27, 1996	4–4 OT	New Jersey Devils (1995–96)	18–24–6	15,635	T
49	January 30, 1996	2–8	@ San Jose Sharks (1995–96)	18–25–6	17,190	L
50	January 31, 1996	6–4	@ Los Angeles Kings (1995–96)	19–25–6	11,775	W

February: 6–3–1 (home: 2–2–1; road: 4–1–0)

Game	Date	Score	Opponent	Record	Attendance	Recap
51	February 2, 1996	4–3	@ Mighty Ducks of Anaheim (1995–96)	20–25–6	17,174	W
52	February 7, 1996	5–3	@ Vancouver Canucks (1995–96)	21–25–6	16,758	W
53	February 9, 1996	3–2 OT	@ Colorado Avalanche (1995–96)	22–25–6	16,061	W
54	February 11, 1996	5–3	@ Dallas Stars (1995–96)	23–25–6	15,397	W
55	February 14, 1996	0–3	Boston Bruins (1995–96)	23–26–6	15,635	L
56	February 17, 1996	2–1 OT	Buffalo Sabres (1995–96)	24–26–6	15,291	W
57	February 21, 1996	5–3	Montreal Canadiens (1995–96)	25–26–6	14,311	W
58	February 23, 1996	4–5	@ Pittsburgh Penguins (1995–96)	25–27–6	17,235	L
59	February 25, 1996	2–6	Dallas Stars (1995–96)	25–28–6	11,143	L
60	February 28, 1996	4–4 OT	Edmonton Oilers (1995–96)	25–28–7	9,360	T

March: 6–6–2 (home: 6–3–0; road: 0–3–2)

Game	Date	Score	Opponent	Record	Attendance	Recap
61	March 1, 1996	2–5	Winnipeg Jets (1995–96)	25–29–7	11,552	L
62	March 2, 1996	7–1	Florida Panthers (1995–96)	26–29–7	11,935	W
63	March 6, 1996	2–4	Detroit Red Wings (1995–96)	26–30–7	11,252	L
64	March 8, 1996	7–4	Toronto Maple Leafs (1995–96)	27–30–7	10,979	W
65	March 9, 1996	3–6	@ St. Louis Blues (1995–96)	27–31–7	20,803	L
66	March 13, 1996	3–2	Pittsburgh Penguins (1995–96)	28–31–7	11,850	W
67	March 16, 1996	2–1	Buffalo Sabres (1995–96)	29–31–7	13,213	W
68	March 18, 1996	6–3	Tampa Bay Lightning (1995–96)	30–31–7	11,440	W
69	March 20, 1996	2–3	@ Montreal Canadiens (1995–96)	30–32–7	21,255	L
70	March 22, 1996	1–1 OT	@ Ottawa Senators (1995–96)	30–32–8	13,596	T
71	March 23, 1996	2–2 OT	@ Washington Capitals (1995–96)	30–32–9	18,130	T
72	March 25, 1996	0–3	@ Philadelphia Flyers (1995–96)	30–33–9	17,380	L
73	March 27, 1996	5–6 OT	Boston Bruins (1995–96)	30–34–9	13,884	L
74	March 30, 1996	3–1	New York Islanders (1995–96)	31–34–9	13,628	W

April: 3–5–0 (home: 2–1–0; road: 1–4–0)

Game	Date	Score	Opponent	Record	Attendance	Recap
75	April 1, 1996	2–3	@ Florida Panthers (1995–96)	31–35–9	13,159	L
76	April 3, 1996	2–4	@ Tampa Bay Lightning (1995–96)	31–36–9	22,576	L
77	April 4, 1996	1–0	@ New Jersey Devils (1995–96)	32–36–9	17,757	W
78	April 6, 1996	3–6	New Jersey Devils (1995–96)	32–37–9	13,521	L
79	April 8, 1996	5–4	Pittsburgh Penguins (1995–96)	33–37–9	12,683	W
80	April 11, 1996	2–3	@ Boston Bruins (1995–96)	33–38–9	17,565	L
81	April 13, 1996	2–0	Boston Bruins (1995–96)	34–38–9	15,635	W
82	April 14, 1996	1–4	@ Buffalo Sabres (1995–96)	34–39–9	16,230	L

Legend: W Win (2 points) L Loss (0 points) T Tie (1 point)

== Player statistics ==
=== Scoring ===
- Position abbreviations: C = Center; D = Defense; G = Goaltender; LW = Left wing; RW = Right wing
- † = Joined team via a transaction (e.g., trade, waivers, signing) during the season. Stats reflect time with the Whalers only.
- ‡ = Left team via a transaction (e.g., trade, waivers, release) during the season. Stats reflect time with the Whalers only.

No.	Player	Pos	Regular season					
No.	Player	Pos	GP	G	A	Pts	+/-	PIM
94	Brendan Shanahan	LW	74	44	34	78	2	125
8	Geoff Sanderson	LW	81	34	31	65	0	40
21	Andrew Cassels	C	81	20	43	63	8	39
16	Nelson Emerson	RW	81	29	29	58	−7	78
13 (Note: Nikolishin wore number 11 until Dineen was acquired.)	Andrei Nikolishin	C	61	14	37	51	−2	34
18	Robert Kron	LW	77	22	28	50	−1	6
27	Jeff Brown†	D	48	7	31	38	2	38
28	Paul Ranheim	LW	73	10	20	30	−2	14
92	Jeff O'Neill	RW	65	8	19	27	−3	40
20	Glen Wesley	D	68	8	16	24	−9	88
12	Steven Rice	RW	59	10	12	22	−4	47
6	Adam Burt	D	78	4	9	13	−4	121
36	Glen Featherstone	D	68	2	10	12	10	138
4 (Note: Diduck wore number 44 through December 18.)	Gerald Diduck	D	79	1	9	10	7	88
24	Sami Kapanen	RW	35	5	4	9	0	6
10	Brad McCrimmon	D	58	3	6	9	15	62
11	Kevin Dineen†	RW	20	2	7	9	7	67
22	Mark Janssens	C	81	2	7	9	−13	155
4	Frantisek Kucera‡	D	30	2	6	8	−3	10
15	Scott Daniels	LW	53	3	4	7	−4	254
39	Kelly Chase	RW	55	2	4	6	−4	230
1	Sean Burke	G	66	0	6	6		16
32	Steve Martins	C	23	1	3	4	−3	8
7	Brian Glynn	D	54	0	4	4	−15	44
14	Kevin Smyth	LW	21	2	1	3	−5	8
26	Jocelyn Lemieux‡	RW	29	1	2	3	−11	31
33	Jimmy Carson‡	C	11	1	0	1	1	0
5	Alexander Godynyuk	D	3	0	0	0	−1	2
23	Marek Malik	D	7	0	0	0	−3	4
25	Jason McBain	D	3	0	0	0	−1	0
29	Jason Muzzatti	G	22	0	0	0		33
35	Jeff Reese‡	G	7	0	0	0		0

=== Goaltending ===
- ‡ = Left team via a transaction (e.g., trade, waivers, release) during the season. Stats reflect time with the Whalers only.

No.	Player	Regular season									
No.	Player	GP	W	L	T	SA	GA	GAA	SV%	SO	TOI
1	Sean Burke	66	28	28	6	2034	190	3.11	.907	4	3669
29	Jason Muzzatti	22	4	8	3	551	49	2.90	.911	1	1013
35	Jeff Reese‡	7	2	3	0	170	14	3.06	.918	1	275

== Awards and records ==
=== Awards ===
Type	Award/honor	Recipient	Ref
League (in-season)	NHL All-Star Game selection	Brendan Shanahan (Note: Shanahan was voted to the starting lineup.)	
Team	Award of Excellence	Brad McCrimmon	
Team	Booster Club MVP Award	Sean Burke	
Team	Frank Keys Memorial Award	Brad McCrimmon	
Team	Mark Kravitz Award	Sean Burke	
Team	Most Valuable Defenseman	Jeff Brown	
Team	Three Star Award of Excellence	Sean Burke	
Team	Top Gun Award	Brendan Shanahan	
Team	True Grit Award	Nelson Emerson	

=== Milestones ===
Milestone	Player	Date	Ref
First game	Jeff O'Neill	October 7, 1995	
First game	Steve Martins	December 6, 1995	
First game	Sami Kapanen	December 13, 1995	
First game	Jason McBain	April 11, 1996	

== Transactions ==
The Whalers were involved in the following transactions during the 1995–96 season.

=== Trades ===
May 31, 1995	To Los Angeles Kings Jan Vopat	To Hartford Whalers 4th round pick in 1995 - Ian MacNeil
July 27, 1995	To St. Louis Blues Chris Pronger	To Hartford Whalers Brendan Shanahan
October 6, 1995	To Winnipeg Jets Darren Turcotte	To Hartford Whalers Nelson Emerson
November 29, 1995	To Dallas Stars Robert Petrovicky	To Hartford Whalers Dan Kesa
December 1, 1995	To Tampa Bay Lightning Jeff Reese	To Hartford Whalers 9th round pick in 1996 - Askhat Rakhmatulin
December 19, 1995	To New Jersey Devils Jocelyn Lemieux; 2nd round pick in 1998 - John Erskine	To Hartford Whalers Jim Dowd; 2nd round pick in 1997 - Dmitri Kokorev
December 19, 1995	To Vancouver Canucks Jim Dowd; Frantisek Kucera; 2nd round pick in 1997 - Ryan Bonni	To Hartford Whalers Jeff Brown; 3rd round pick in 1998 - Paul Manning
December 28, 1995	To Philadelphia Flyers 3rd round pick in 1997 - Kris Mallette; 7th round pick in 1997 - Andrew Merrick	To Hartford Whalers Kevin Dineen

=== Waivers ===
October 6, 1995	From Calgary Flames Jason Muzzatti

=== Free agents ===
Player	Former team
Jeff Daniels	Detroit Vipers (IHL)
Gerald Diduck	Chicago Blackhawks
David Williams	Anaheim Mighty Ducks

Player	New team
Jeff Bloemberg	Detroit Red Wings
Jim Sandlak	Vancouver Canucks

== Draft picks ==
Hartford's picks at the 1995 NHL entry draft held at the Edmonton Coliseum in Edmonton, Alberta.

Round	#	Player	Position	Nationality	College/Junior/Club team (League)
1	13	Jean-Sebastien Giguere	Goaltender	Canada	Halifax Mooseheads (QMJHL)
2	35	Sergei Fedotov	Defense	Russia	Dynamo Moscow (Russia)
4	85	Ian MacNeil	Center	Canada	Oshawa Generals (OHL)
4	87	Sami Kapanen	Right wing	Finland	HIFK (Finland)
5	113	Hugh Hamilton	Defense	Canada	Spokane Chiefs (WHL)
7	165	Byron Ritchie	Center	Canada	Lethbridge Hurricanes (WHL)
8	191	Milan Kostolny	Right wing	Slovakia	Detroit Junior Red Wings (OHL)
9	217	Mike Rucinski	Defense	United States	Detroit Junior Red Wings (OHL)

== See also ==
- 1995–96 NHL season
