= 1995–96 New York Islanders season =

NHL hockey team season

1995–96 New York Islanders
- Division: 7th Atlantic
- Conference: 12th Eastern
- 1995–96 record: 22–50–10
- Home record: 14–21–6
- Road record: 8–29–4
- Goals for: 229
- Goals against: 315

Team information
- General manager: Don Maloney (Oct.–Dec.); Darcy Regier (Dec.); Mike Milbury (Dec.–Apr.)
- Coach: Mike Milbury
- Captain: Patrick Flatley
- Arena: Nassau Coliseum
- Average attendance: 11,355
- Minor league affiliates: Utah Grizzlies; Tallahassee Tiger Sharks

Team leaders
- Goals: Zigmund Palffy (43)
- Assists: Travis Green (45)
- Points: Zigmund Palffy (87)
- Penalty minutes: Brent Severyn (180)
- Plus/minus: Brent Severyn (+3)
- Wins: Tommy Soderstrom (11)
- Goals against average: Eric Fichaud (3.31)

The 1995–96 New York Islanders season was the 24th season in the franchise's history. This season saw the Islanders finish in last place with a record of 22–50–10 and miss the playoffs for the second straight year. During the season, team management fired General Manager Don Maloney, whom fans blamed for the team's downfall, and gave Mike Milbury total control of hockey operations as both head coach and general manager.

== Offseason ==
Before the 1995–96 season, Don Maloney fired Lorne Henning and named Mike Milbury head coach. The same year, the Isles' attempt at updating their look resulted in the unveiling of the "fisherman" logo. It proved to be such a disaster that the team announced less than a year after unveiling it that they would go back to their original logo as soon as league rules could allow. Rangers fans still mock the Islanders with chants of "we want fishsticks", a reference to the way the logo resembled the Gorton's fisherman.

== Regular season ==
=== Season standings ===
Atlantic Division
No.		GP	W	L	T	GF	GA	Pts
1	**Philadelphia Flyers**	82	45	24	13	282	208	103
2	**New York Rangers**	82	41	27	14	272	237	96
3	**Florida Panthers**	82	41	31	10	254	234	92
4	**Washington Capitals**	82	39	32	11	234	204	89
5	**Tampa Bay Lightning**	82	38	32	12	238	248	88
6	New Jersey Devils	82	37	33	12	215	202	86
7	New York Islanders	82	22	50	10	229	315	54

Eastern Conference
R		Div	GP	W	L	T	GF	GA	Pts
**1**	**Philadelphia Flyers**	**ATL**	**82**	**45**	**24**	**13**	**282**	**208**	**103**
**2**	**Pittsburgh Penguins**	**NE**	**82**	**49**	**29**	**4**	**362**	**284**	**102**
**3**	**New York Rangers**	**ATL**	**82**	**41**	**27**	**14**	**272**	**237**	**96**
**4**	**Florida Panthers**	**ATL**	**82**	**41**	**31**	**10**	**254**	**234**	**92**
**5**	**Boston Bruins**	**NE**	**82**	**40**	**31**	**11**	**282**	**269**	**91**
**6**	**Montreal Canadiens**	**NE**	**82**	**40**	**32**	**10**	**265**	**248**	**90**
**7**	**Washington Capitals**	**ATL**	**82**	**39**	**32**	**11**	**234**	**204**	**89**
**8**	**Tampa Bay Lightning**	**ATL**	**82**	**38**	**32**	**12**	**238**	**248**	**88**
9	New Jersey Devils	ATL	82	37	33	12	215	202	86
10	Hartford Whalers	NE	82	34	39	9	237	259	77
11	Buffalo Sabres	NE	82	33	42	7	247	262	73
12	New York Islanders	ATL	82	22	50	10	229	315	54
13	Ottawa Senators	NE	82	18	59	5	191	291	41

Divisions: ATL – Atlantic, NE – Northeast

bold – Qualified for playoffs

== Schedule and results ==
1995–96 regular season
October: 2–6–2 (home: 1–3–1; road: 1–3–1)

Game	Date	Score	Opponent	Record	Recap
1	October 7, 1995	4–4 OT	@ Boston Bruins (1995–96)	0–0–1	T
2	October 10, 1995	3–7	@ Toronto Maple Leafs (1995–96)	0–1–1	L
3	October 14, 1995	0–3	Philadelphia Flyers (1995–96)	0–2–1	L
4	October 15, 1995	3–5	@ Florida Panthers (1995–96)	0–3–1	L
5	October 17, 1995	1–5	New York Rangers (1995–96)	0–4–1	L
6	October 20, 1995	2–0	Montreal Canadiens (1995–96)	1–4–1	W
7	October 25, 1995	1–3	@ Philadelphia Flyers (1995–96)	1–5–1	L
8	October 26, 1995	5–7	Pittsburgh Penguins (1995–96)	1–6–1	L
9	October 28, 1995	5–5 OT	Philadelphia Flyers (1995–96)	1–6–2	T
10	October 31, 1995	5–4 OT	@ Florida Panthers (1995–96)	2–6–2	W

November: 3–9–1 (home: 1–5–0; road: 2–4–1)

Game	Date	Score	Opponent	Record	Recap
11	November 3, 1995	3–5	@ Tampa Bay Lightning (1995–96)	2–7–2	L
12	November 4, 1995	2–3	Washington Capitals (1995–96)	2–8–2	L
13	November 7, 1995	2–5	Vancouver Canucks (1995–96)	2–9–2	L
14	November 10, 1995	1–4	@ New York Rangers (1995–96)	2–10–2	L
15	November 11, 1995	1–4	St. Louis Blues (1995–96)	2–11–2	L
16	November 14, 1995	5–3	@ San Jose Sharks (1995–96)	3–11–2	W
17	November 16, 1995	2–9	@ Los Angeles Kings (1995–96)	3–12–2	L
18	November 17, 1995	1–2 OT	@ Mighty Ducks of Anaheim (1995–96)	3–13–2	L
19	November 22, 1995	5–2	Los Angeles Kings (1995–96)	4–13–2	W
20	November 24, 1995	1–1 OT	@ Buffalo Sabres (1995–96)	4–13–3	T
21	November 25, 1995	1–2	Tampa Bay Lightning (1995–96)	4–14–3	L
22	November 28, 1995	3–7	Colorado Avalanche (1995–96)	4–15–3	L
23	November 30, 1995	5–3	@ Ottawa Senators (1995–96)	5–15–3	W

December: 4–7–3 (home: 2–2–2; road: 2–5–1)

Game	Date	Score	Opponent	Record	Recap
24	December 2, 1995	4–1	New Jersey Devils (1995–96)	6–15–3	W
25	December 5, 1995	3–6	Pittsburgh Penguins (1995–96)	6–16–3	L
26	December 6, 1995	4–7	@ Hartford Whalers (1995–96)	6–17–3	L
27	December 9, 1995	2–4	@ New Jersey Devils (1995–96)	6–18–3	L
28	December 10, 1995	6–2	@ Philadelphia Flyers (1995–96)	7–18–3	W
29	December 12, 1995	1–3	Florida Panthers (1995–96)	7–19–3	L
30	December 14, 1995	3–4 OT	@ Washington Capitals (1995–96)	7–20–3	L
31	December 16, 1995	3–3 OT	Hartford Whalers (1995–96)	7–20–4	T
32	December 19, 1995	1–4	@ St. Louis Blues (1995–96)	7–21–4	L
33	December 21, 1995	3–3 OT	@ Dallas Stars (1995–96)	7–21–5	T
34	December 23, 1995	3–1	Washington Capitals (1995–96)	8–21–5	W
35	December 26, 1995	3–3 OT	Boston Bruins (1995–96)	8–21–6	T
36	December 27, 1995	3–5	@ New Jersey Devils (1995–96)	8–22–6	L
37	December 31, 1995	5–2	@ Buffalo Sabres (1995–96)	9–22–6	W

January: 4–5–2 (home: 4–1–2; road: 0–4–0)

Game	Date	Score	Opponent	Record	Recap
38	January 4, 1996	2–2 OT	Montreal Canadiens (1995–96)	9–22–7	T
39	January 6, 1996	5–4	Ottawa Senators (1995–96)	10–22–7	W
40	January 9, 1996	3–3 OT	Chicago Blackhawks (1995–96)	10–22–8	T
41	January 11, 1996	4–3	Toronto Maple Leafs (1995–96)	11–22–8	W
42	January 15, 1996	3–2	Tampa Bay Lightning (1995–96)	12–22–8	W
43	January 17, 1996	3–6	Hartford Whalers (1995–96)	12–23–8	L
44	January 22, 1996	3–4	@ Colorado Avalanche (1995–96)	12–24–8	L
45	January 24, 1996	1–4	@ Calgary Flames (1995–96)	12–25–8	L
46	January 26, 1996	1–4	@ Edmonton Oilers (1995–96)	12–26–8	L
47	January 27, 1996	3–6	@ Vancouver Canucks (1995–96)	12–27–8	L
48	January 30, 1996	5–4 OT	Buffalo Sabres (1995–96)	13–27–8	W

February: 5–8–0 (home: 4–5–0; road: 1–3–0)

Game	Date	Score	Opponent	Record	Recap
49	February 3, 1996	5–6 OT	@ Washington Capitals (1995–96)	13–28–8	L
50	February 4, 1996	5–3	Dallas Stars (1995–96)	14–28–8	W
51	February 6, 1996	2–4	New York Rangers (1995–96)	14–29–8	L
52	February 8, 1996	2–6	@ New York Rangers (1995–96)	14–30–8	L
53	February 10, 1996	4–3	Mighty Ducks of Anaheim (1995–96)	15–30–8	W
54	February 12, 1996	1–4	Ottawa Senators (1995–96)	15–31–8	L
55	February 15, 1996	3–6	Calgary Flames (1995–96)	15–32–8	L
56	February 17, 1996	4–2	San Jose Sharks (1995–96)	16–32–8	W
57	February 22, 1996	5–3	@ New York Rangers (1995–96)	17–32–8	W
58	February 23, 1996	2–3 OT	Tampa Bay Lightning (1995–96)	17–33–8	L
59	February 25, 1996	2–0	Edmonton Oilers (1995–96)	18–33–8	W
60	February 27, 1996	2–6	Detroit Red Wings (1995–96)	18–34–8	L
61	February 29, 1996	1–5	@ Detroit Red Wings (1995–96)	18–35–8	L

March: 2–12–0 (home: 1–4–0; road: 1–8–0)

Game	Date	Score	Opponent	Record	Recap
62	March 1, 1996	2–6	@ New Jersey Devils (1995–96)	18–36–8	L
63	March 3, 1996	5–7	Winnipeg Jets (1995–96)	18–37–8	L
64	March 5, 1996	5–3	Boston Bruins (1995–96)	19–37–8	W
65	March 7, 1996	3–4	@ Boston Bruins (1995–96)	19–38–8	L
66	March 9, 1996	4–2	@ Winnipeg Jets (1995–96)	20–38–8	W
67	March 16, 1996	2–4	@ Pittsburgh Penguins (1995–96)	20–39–8	L
68	March 17, 1996	1–5	@ Chicago Blackhawks (1995–96)	20–40–8	L
69	March 19, 1996	1–4	@ Philadelphia Flyers (1995–96)	20–41–8	L
70	March 21, 1996	2–3	@ Florida Panthers (1995–96)	20–42–8	L
71	March 23, 1996	2–3 OT	New Jersey Devils (1995–96)	20–43–8	L
72	March 25, 1996	1–4	@ Montreal Canadiens (1995–96)	20–44–8	L
73	March 26, 1996	1–7	Washington Capitals (1995–96)	20–45–8	L
74	March 30, 1996	1–3	@ Hartford Whalers (1995–96)	20–46–8	L
75	March 31, 1996	1–4	New York Rangers (1995–96)	20–47–8	L

April: 2–3–2 (home: 1–1–1; road: 1–2–1)

Game	Date	Score	Opponent	Record	Recap
76	April 2, 1996	2–6	Philadelphia Flyers (1995–96)	20–48–8	L
77	April 5, 1996	2–4	@ Ottawa Senators (1995–96)	20–49–8	L
78	April 6, 1996	3–0	Buffalo Sabres (1995–96)	21–49–8	W
79	April 8, 1996	3–4	@ Tampa Bay Lightning (1995–96)	21–50–8	L
80	April 10, 1996	6–2	@ Pittsburgh Penguins (1995–96)	22–50–8	W
81	April 12, 1996	1–1 OT	Florida Panthers (1995–96)	22–50–9	T
82	April 13, 1996	5–5 OT	@ Montreal Canadiens (1995–96)	22–50–10	T

Legend: W Win (2 points) L Loss (0 points) T Tie (1 point)

== Player statistics ==
=== Scoring ===
- Position abbreviations: C = Center; D = Defense; G = Goaltender; LW = Left wing; RW = Right wing
- † = Joined team via a transaction (e.g., trade, waivers, signing) during the season. Stats reflect time with the Islanders only.
- ‡ = Left team via a transaction (e.g., trade, waivers, release) during the season. Stats reflect time with the Islanders only.

No.	Player	Pos	Regular season					
No.	Player	Pos	GP	G	A	Pts	+/-	PIM
16 (Note: Palffy wore number 68 in his first eleven games.)	Zigmund Palffy	RW	81	43	44	87	−17	56
39	Travis Green	C	69	25	45	70	−20	42
72	Mathieu Schneider‡	D	65	11	36	47	−18	93
18	Marty McInnis	RW	74	12	34	46	−11	39
17	Wendel Clark‡	LW	58	24	19	43	−12	60
44	Todd Bertuzzi	RW	76	18	21	39	−14	83
28	Alexander Semak	C	69	20	14	34	−4	68
27	Derek King	LW	61	12	20	32	−10	23
32	Niklas Andersson	LW	47	14	12	26	−3	12
4	Bryan McCabe	D	82	7	16	23	−24	156
26	Patrick Flatley	RW	56	8	9	17	−24	21
7	Scott Lachance	D	55	3	10	13	−19	54
20	Bob Sweeney‡	C	66	6	6	12	−23	59
82 (Note: Straka wore number 43 in his first game.)	Martin Straka†‡	C	22	2	10	12	−6	6
6	Chris Luongo	D	74	3	7	10	−23	55
24	Brent Severyn	LW	65	1	8	9	3	180
21	Dan Plante	RW	73	5	3	8	−22	50
11	Darius Kasparaitis	D	46	1	7	8	−12	93
9	Kirk Muller‡	LW	15	4	3	7	−10	15
34 (Note: Vasilyev wore number 14 in his first six games and then number 36 in his next two games.)	Andrei Vasilyev	LW	10	2	5	7	4	2
37	Dennis Vaske	D	19	1	6	7	−13	21
17	Darby Hendrickson†	C	16	1	4	5	−6	33
2	Bob Beers	D	13	0	5	5	−2	10
14	Derek Armstrong	C	19	1	3	4	−6	14
3	Kenny Jonsson†	D	16	0	4	4	−5	10
33	Milan Tichy	D	8	0	4	4	3	8
15	Brad Dalgarno	RW	18	1	2	3	−2	14
75	Brett Lindros	RW	18	1	2	3	−6	47
47	Rich Pilon	D	27	0	3	3	−9	72
25	Pat Conacher†	LW	13	1	1	2	−4	0
12	Mick Vukota	RW	32	1	1	2	−3	106
10	Craig Darby	C	10	0	2	2	−1	0
14 (Note: Cole wore number 10 in his first game.)	Danton Cole‡	RW	10	1	0	1	0	0
36 (Note: Aivazoff wore number 34 in his first game and then number 10 in his next eight games.)	Micah Aivazoff	C	12	0	1	1	−6	6
3	Dean Chynoweth‡	D	14	0	1	1	−4	40
34	Jarrett Deuling	LW	14	0	1	1	−1	11
1	Eric Fichaud	G	24	0	1	1		0
34	Jason Herter	D	1	0	1	1	1	0
38	Andreas Johansson	C	3	0	1	1	1	0
43 (Note: Taylor wore number 14 in his first five games.)	Chris Taylor	C	11	0	1	1	1	2
33	Ken Belanger†	LW	7	0	0	0	−2	27
36 (Note: Halkidis wore number 3 in his first three games.)	Bob Halkidis†	D	5	0	0	0	−3	30
43	Mike MacWilliam	LW	6	0	0	0	−1	14
29	Jamie McLennan	G	13	0	0	0		2
32	Grigori Panteleev	LW	4	0	0	0	−3	0
35	Tommy Salo	G	10	0	0	0		0
30	Tommy Soderstrom	G	51	0	0	0		7
36	Jason Strudwick	D	1	0	0	0	0	7
34	Jason Widmer	D	4	0	0	0	0	7

=== Goaltending ===
No.	Player	Regular season									
No.	Player	GP	W	L	T	SA	GA	GAA	SV%	SO	TOI
30	Tommy Soderstrom	51	11	22	6	1370	167	3.87	.878	2	2590
1	Eric Fichaud	24	7	12	2	659	68	3.31	.897	1	1234
29	Jamie McLennan	13	3	9	1	342	39	3.68	.886	0	636
35	Tommy Salo	10	1	7	1	250	35	4.01	.860	0	523

== Awards and records ==
=== Awards ===
Type	Award/honor	Recipient	Ref
League (annual)	Lester Patrick Trophy	Ken Morrow	
League (in-season)	NHL All-Star Game selection	Mathieu Schneider	
Team	Bob Nystrom Award	Dan Plante	

=== Milestones ===
Milestone	Player	Date	Ref
First game	Todd Bertuzzi	October 7, 1995	
First game	Bryan McCabe	October 7, 1995	
First game	Jason Herter	December 6, 1995	
First game	Eric Fichaud	January 30, 1996	
First game	Jarrett Deuling	February 25, 1996	
First game	Mike MacWilliam	March 17, 1996	
First game	Jason Strudwick	March 30, 1996	
First game	Andreas Johansson	April 5, 1996	

== Draft picks ==
New York's draft picks at the 1995 NHL entry draft held at the Edmonton Coliseum in Edmonton, Alberta.

Round	#	Player	Nationality	College/Junior/Club team (League)
1	2	Wade Redden	Canada	Brandon Wheat Kings (WHL)
2	28	Jan Hlavac	Czech Republic	Sparta Prague (Czech Republic)
2	41	D. J. Smith	Canada	Windsor Spitfires (OHL)
5	106	Vladimir Orszagh	Slovakia	Iskra Banská Bystrica (Slovakia)
7	158	Andrew Taylor	Canada	Detroit Junior Red Wings (OHL)
9	210	David MacDonald	Canada	Sudbury Wolves (OHL)
9	211	Mike Broda	Canada	Moose Jaw Warriors (WHL)
