= 1995–96 St. Louis Blues season =

National Hockey League team season

1995–96 St. Louis Blues
- Division: 4th Central
- Conference: 5th Western
- 1995–96 record: 32–34–16
- Home record: 15–17–9
- Road record: 17–17–7
- Goals for: 219
- Goals against: 248

Team information
- General manager: Mike Keenan
- Coach: Mike Keenan
- Captain: Brett Hull (Oct.); Shayne Corson (Oct.–Feb.); Wayne Gretzky (Feb.–May)
- Alternate captains: Shayne Corson (Oct., Feb.–May); Brett Hull (Dec.–Feb.); Al MacInnis; Jay Wells (Oct.–Dec.)
- Arena: Kiel Center
- Average attendance: 18,805
- Minor league affiliates: Worcester IceCats; Birmingham Bulls

Team leaders
- Goals: Brett Hull (43)
- Assists: Al MacInnis (44)
- Points: Brett Hull (83)
- Penalty minutes: Shayne Corson (192)
- Plus/minus: Mike Hudson (+7)
- Wins: Grant Fuhr (30)
- Goals against average: Grant Fuhr (2.87)

The 1995–96 St. Louis Blues season was the 29th in franchise history. The Blues hired head coach Mike Keenan as general manager. One of Keenan's first moves was trading Brendan Shanahan to the Hartford Whalers for Chris Pronger. Late in the season, Keenan acquired Wayne Gretzky from the Los Angeles Kings, reuniting him with former Oilers such as Glenn Anderson, Charlie Huddy, Craig MacTavish, and Grant Fuhr. Fuhr was hurt in the final game of the regular season and only played 2 games in the playoffs.

The Blues defeated the Toronto Maple Leafs in the Western Conference Quarter-finals in the last playoff series ever played at Maple Leaf Gardens. In the Western Conference Semifinals, the Blues lost to the President's Trophy winners, the Detroit Red Wings, in seven games. The Blues had seven eventual Hockey Hall of Fame members during the season (Gretzky, Hull, MacInnis, Anderson, Fuhr, Hawerchuk and Pronger).

== Regular season ==
=== Wayne Gretzky trade ===
On February 27, the St. Louis Blues acquired Wayne Gretzky from the Los Angeles Kings for Craig Johnson, Patrice Tardif, Roman Vopat and draft picks. In 18 regular season games with the Blues, Gretzky recorded 21 points as the Blues qualified for the playoffs for the 17th straight season with a record of 32–34–16. He scored 14 points in 13 playoff games for the team, and the Blues lost Game 7 of the conference semifinals in overtime. He also served as the team's captain (replacing Corson) during his short tenure with the Blues.

=== Final standings ===
Central Division
No.		GP	W	L	T	GF	GA	Pts
1	**Detroit Red Wings**	82	62	13	7	325	181	131
2	**Chicago Blackhawks**	82	40	28	14	273	220	94
3	**Toronto Maple Leafs**	82	34	36	12	247	252	80
4	**St. Louis Blues**	82	32	34	16	219	248	80
5	**Winnipeg Jets**	82	36	40	6	275	291	78
6	Dallas Stars	82	26	42	14	227	280	66

Note: GP = Games played; W = Wins; L = Losses; T = Ties; GF = Goals for; GA = Goals against; Pts = Points
Bolded teams qualified for the playoffs.

Western Conference
R		Div	GP	W	L	T	GF	GA	Pts
**1**	**p – Detroit Red Wings**	**CEN**	**82**	**62**	**13**	**7**	**325**	**181**	**131**
**2**	**Colorado Avalanche**	**PAC**	**82**	**47**	**25**	**10**	**326**	**240**	**104**
**3**	**Chicago Blackhawks**	**CEN**	**82**	**40**	**28**	**14**	**273**	**220**	**94**
**4**	**Toronto Maple Leafs**	**CEN**	**82**	**34**	**36**	**12**	**247**	**252**	**80**
**5**	**St. Louis Blues**	**CEN**	**82**	**32**	**34**	**16**	**219**	**248**	**80**
**6**	**Calgary Flames**	**PAC**	**82**	**34**	**37**	**11**	**241**	**240**	**79**
**7**	**Vancouver Canucks**	**PAC**	**82**	**32**	**35**	**15**	**278**	**278**	**79**
**8**	**Winnipeg Jets**	**CEN**	**82**	**36**	**40**	**6**	**275**	**291**	**78**
9	Mighty Ducks of Anaheim	PAC	82	35	39	8	234	247	78
10	Edmonton Oilers	PAC	82	30	44	8	240	304	68
11	Dallas Stars	CEN	82	26	42	14	227	280	66
12	Los Angeles Kings	PAC	82	24	40	18	256	302	66
13	San Jose Sharks	PAC	82	20	55	7	252	357	47

Divisions: CEN – Central, PAC – Pacific

bold – Qualified for playoffs; p – Won Presidents' Trophy

== Playoffs ==
In the playoffs, Gretzky would provide a spark as the Blues overcame an injury to goalie Grant Fuhr in Game 1 to beat the Toronto Maple Leafs in 6 games. Backup goalie Jon Casey continued to keep the Blues hopes alive as they jumped out to a 3–2 series lead against the Detroit Red Wings. However, the Wings would rally and win the series in double overtime in Game 7 on Steve Yzerman's goal.

== Schedule and results ==
=== Regular season ===
1995–96 regular season
October: 5–5–1 (home: 3–3–1; road: 2–2–0)

Game	Date	Score	Opponent	Record	Recap
1	October 7, 1995	1–4	@ Washington Capitals (1995–96)	0–1–0	L
2	October 10, 1995	5–3	Edmonton Oilers (1995–96)	1–1–0	W
3	October 12, 1995	3–1	@ Dallas Stars (1995–96)	2–1–0	W
4	October 14, 1995	4–1	Colorado Avalanche (1995–96)	3–1–0	W
5	October 17, 1995	4–7	Boston Bruins (1995–96)	3–2–0	L
6	October 19, 1995	1–1 OT	Dallas Stars (1995–96)	3–2–1	T
7	October 21, 1995	1–4	Chicago Blackhawks (1995–96)	3–3–1	L
8	October 22, 1995	2–5	@ Buffalo Sabres (1995–96)	3–4–1	L
9	October 25, 1995	4–2	@ Hartford Whalers (1995–96)	4–4–1	W
10	October 27, 1995	4–2	Mighty Ducks of Anaheim (1995–96)	5–4–1	W
11	October 29, 1995	1–3	Washington Capitals (1995–96)	5–5–1	L

November: 5–7–2 (home: 3–3–2; road: 2–4–0)

Game	Date	Score	Opponent	Record	Recap
12	November 1, 1995	0–3	@ Mighty Ducks of Anaheim (1995–96)	5–6–1	L
13	November 4, 1995	3–7	@ San Jose Sharks (1995–96)	5–7–1	L
14	November 7, 1995	0–1	Los Angeles Kings (1995–96)	5–8–1	L
15	November 10, 1995	3–2	Winnipeg Jets (1995–96)	6–8–1	W
16	November 11, 1995	4–1	@ New York Islanders (1995–96)	7–8–1	W
17	November 14, 1995	1–1 OT	New York Rangers (1995–96)	7–8–2	T
18	November 16, 1995	3–1	San Jose Sharks (1995–96)	8–8–2	W
19	November 18, 1995	2–5	@ Boston Bruins (1995–96)	8–9–2	L
20	November 21, 1995	2–5	@ Toronto Maple Leafs (1995–96)	8–10–2	L
21	November 23, 1995	2–3	Vancouver Canucks (1995–96)	8–11–2	L
22	November 25, 1995	2–2 OT	Toronto Maple Leafs (1995–96)	8–11–3	T
23	November 27, 1995	0–2	Buffalo Sabres (1995–96)	8–12–3	L
24	November 29, 1995	5–4	Montreal Canadiens (1995–96)	9–12–3	W
25	November 30, 1995	4–1	@ Winnipeg Jets (1995–96)	10–12–3	W

December: 6–5–2 (home: 3–2–1; road: 3–3–1)

Game	Date	Score	Opponent	Record	Recap
26	December 2, 1995	7–3	@ Edmonton Oilers (1995–96)	11–12–3	W
27	December 5, 1995	1–1 OT	@ Calgary Flames (1995–96)	11–12–4	T
28	December 8, 1995	6–3	@ Vancouver Canucks (1995–96)	12–12–4	W
29	December 9, 1995	2–1	@ Los Angeles Kings (1995–96)	13–12–4	W
30	December 12, 1995	2–5	Detroit Red Wings (1995–96)	13–13–4	L
31	December 14, 1995	3–3 OT	Calgary Flames (1995–96)	13–13–5	T
32	December 16, 1995	3–2	San Jose Sharks (1995–96)	14–13–5	W
33	December 19, 1995	4–1	New York Islanders (1995–96)	15–13–5	W
34	December 22, 1995	1–2	@ Colorado Avalanche (1995–96)	15–14–5	L
35	December 23, 1995	1–2	@ Winnipeg Jets (1995–96)	15–15–5	L
36	December 26, 1995	2–3	@ Detroit Red Wings (1995–96)	15–16–5	L
37	December 28, 1995	4–1	Dallas Stars (1995–96)	16–16–5	W
38	December 30, 1995	3–4 OT	Toronto Maple Leafs (1995–96)	16–17–5	L

January: 5–3–3 (home: 2–1–0; road: 3–2–3)

Game	Date	Score	Opponent	Record	Recap
39	January 4, 1996	3–1	@ Chicago Blackhawks (1995–96)	17–17–5	W
40	January 6, 1996	3–2	Pittsburgh Penguins (1995–96)	18–17–5	W
41	January 9, 1996	2–4	@ New Jersey Devils (1995–96)	18–18–5	L
42	January 11, 1996	4–4 OT	@ Philadelphia Flyers (1995–96)	18–18–6	T
43	January 13, 1996	3–3 OT	@ Montreal Canadiens (1995–96)	18–18–7	T
44	January 14, 1996	3–3 OT	@ New York Rangers (1995–96)	18–18–8	T
45	January 16, 1996	1–5	Edmonton Oilers (1995–96)	18–19–8	L
46	January 24, 1996	6–5	@ Winnipeg Jets (1995–96)	19–19–8	W
47	January 27, 1996	2–1	Tampa Bay Lightning (1995–96)	20–19–8	W
48	January 29, 1996	2–4	@ Ottawa Senators (1995–96)	20–20–8	L
49	January 31, 1996	4–0	@ Toronto Maple Leafs (1995–96)	21–20–8	W

February: 5–4–4 (home: 2–4–2; road: 3–0–2)

Game	Date	Score	Opponent	Record	Recap
50	February 1, 1996	2–2 OT	Vancouver Canucks (1995–96)	21–20–9	T
51	February 3, 1996	3–7	Philadelphia Flyers (1995–96)	21–21–9	L
52	February 6, 1996	2–5	Dallas Stars (1995–96)	21–22–9	L
53	February 8, 1996	1–6	Chicago Blackhawks (1995–96)	21–23–9	L
54	February 10, 1996	6–3	@ Dallas Stars (1995–96)	22–23–9	W
55	February 11, 1996	2–2 OT	@ Florida Panthers (1995–96)	22–23–10	T
56	February 13, 1996	3–2	@ Tampa Bay Lightning (1995–96)	23–23–10	W
57	February 16, 1996	4–3	Detroit Red Wings (1995–96)	24–23–10	W
58	February 18, 1996	3–0	Winnipeg Jets (1995–96)	25–23–10	W
59	February 20, 1996	1–7	Ottawa Senators (1995–96)	25–24–10	L
60	February 22, 1996	4–3 OT	@ Chicago Blackhawks (1995–96)	26–24–10	W
61	February 24, 1996	2–2 OT	Los Angeles Kings (1995–96)	26–24–11	T
62	February 29, 1996	2–2 OT	@ Vancouver Canucks (1995–96)	26–24–12	T

March: 5–7–2 (home: 2–2–2; road: 3–5–0)

Game	Date	Score	Opponent	Record	Recap
63	March 3, 1996	4–3	@ Edmonton Oilers (1995–96)	27–24–12	W
64	March 5, 1996	2–0	Florida Panthers (1995–96)	28–24–12	W
65	March 7, 1996	2–4	Calgary Flames (1995–96)	28–25–12	L
66	March 9, 1996	6–3	Hartford Whalers (1995–96)	29–25–12	W
67	March 12, 1996	2–4	@ Calgary Flames (1995–96)	29–26–12	L
68	March 15, 1996	4–2	@ San Jose Sharks (1995–96)	30–26–12	W
69	March 17, 1996	1–5	@ Mighty Ducks of Anaheim (1995–96)	30–27–12	L
70	March 18, 1996	3–1	@ Los Angeles Kings (1995–96)	31–27–12	W
71	March 20, 1996	1–2	@ Dallas Stars (1995–96)	31–28–12	L
72	March 22, 1996	1–6	Mighty Ducks of Anaheim (1995–96)	31–29–12	L
73	March 24, 1996	2–2 OT	Detroit Red Wings (1995–96)	31–29–13	T
74	March 26, 1996	4–8	@ Pittsburgh Penguins (1995–96)	31–30–13	L
75	March 28, 1996	4–4 OT	New Jersey Devils (1995–96)	31–30–14	T
76	March 31, 1996	1–8	@ Detroit Red Wings (1995–96)	31–31–14	L

April: 1–3–2 (home: 0–2–1; road: 1–1–1)

Game	Date	Score	Opponent	Record	Recap
77	April 3, 1996	6–3	@ Colorado Avalanche (1995–96)	32–31–14	W
78	April 4, 1996	1–3	Toronto Maple Leafs (1995–96)	32–32–14	L
79	April 6, 1996	1–5	@ Toronto Maple Leafs (1995–96)	32–33–14	L
80	April 8, 1996	2–2 OT	Winnipeg Jets (1995–96)	32–33–15	T
81	April 11, 1996	2–3	Colorado Avalanche (1995–96)	32–34–15	L
82	April 14, 1996	2–2 OT	@ Chicago Blackhawks (1995–96)	32–34–16	T

Legend: W Win (2 points) L Loss (0 points) T Tie (1 point)

=== Playoffs ===
1996 Stanley Cup playoffs
Western Conference Quarterfinals vs. (4) Toronto Maple Leafs: Blues win 4–2

Game	Date	Score	Opponent	Series	Recap
1	April 16, 1996	3–1	@ Toronto Maple Leafs	Blues lead 1–0	W
2	April 18, 1996	4–5 OT	@ Toronto Maple Leafs	Series tied 1–1	L
3	April 21, 1996	3–2 OT	Toronto Maple Leafs	Blues lead 2–1	W
4	April 23, 1996	5–1	Toronto Maple Leafs	Blues lead 3–1	W
5	April 25, 1996	4–5 OT	@ Toronto Maple Leafs	Blues lead 3–2	L
6	April 27, 1996	2–1	Toronto Maple Leafs	Blues win 4–2	W

Western Conference Semifinals vs. (1) Detroit Red Wings: Red Wings win 4–3

Game	Date	Score	Opponent	Series	Recap
1	May 3, 1996	2–3	@ Detroit Red Wings	Red Wings lead 1–0	L
2	May 5, 1996	3–8	@ Detroit Red Wings	Red Wings lead 2–0	L
3	May 8, 1996	5–4 OT	Detroit Red Wings	Red Wings lead 2–1	W
4	May 10, 1996	1–0	Detroit Red Wings	Series tied 2–2	W
5	May 12, 1996	3–2	@ Detroit Red Wings	Blues lead 3–2	W
6	May 14, 1996	2–4	Detroit Red Wings	Series tied 3–3	L
7	May 16, 1996	0–1 2OT	@ Detroit Red Wings	Red Wings win 4–3	L

Legend: W Win L Loss

== Player statistics ==
=== Scoring ===
- Position abbreviations: C = Center; D = Defense; G = Goaltender; LW = Left wing; RW = Right wing
- † = Joined team via a transaction (e.g., trade, waivers, signing) during the season. Stats reflect time with the Blues only.
- ‡ = Left team via a transaction (e.g., trade, waivers, release) during the season. Stats reflect time with the Blues only.

No.	Player	Pos	Regular season						Playoffs					
No.	Player	Pos	GP	G	A	Pts	+/-	PIM	GP	G	A	Pts	+/-	PIM
16	Brett Hull	RW	70	43	40	83	4	30	13	6	5	11	2	10
2	Al MacInnis	D	82	17	44	61	5	88	13	3	4	7	2	20
9	Shayne Corson	LW	77	18	28	46	3	192	13	8	6	14	−1	22
10 (Note: Hawerchuk wore number 12 in his first twelve games.)	Dale Hawerchuk‡	C	66	13	28	41	5	22	—	—	—	—	—	—
14	Geoff Courtnall	LW	69	24	16	40	−9	101	13	0	3	3	2	14
28	Brian Noonan	RW	81	13	22	35	2	84	13	4	1	5	−5	10
44	Chris Pronger	D	78	7	18	25	−18	110	13	1	5	6	0	16
20	Adam Creighton	C	61	11	10	21	0	78	13	1	1	2	−4	8
99	Wayne Gretzky†	C	18	8	13	21	−6	2	13	2	14	16	2	0
25	Peter Zezel†	C	57	8	13	21	−2	12	10	3	0	3	4	2
32	Stephane Matteau†	LW	46	7	13	20	−4	65	11	0	2	2	−2	8
23	Craig Johnson‡	LW	49	8	7	15	−4	30	—	—	—	—	—	—
15	Mike Hudson†	RW	32	3	12	15	7	26	2	0	1	1	1	4
5	Igor Kravchuk†	D	40	3	12	15	−6	24	10	1	5	6	0	4
5	Jeff Norton‡	D	36	4	7	11	4	26	—	—	—	—	—	—
34	Murray Baron	D	82	2	9	11	3	190	13	1	0	1	4	20
12 (Note: Pearson wore number 27 through March 7.)	Rob Pearson†	RW	27	6	4	10	4	54	2	0	0	0	1	14
35	Christer Olsson	D	26	2	8	10	−6	14	3	0	0	0	−1	0
22	Ian Laperriere‡	RW	33	3	6	9	−4	87	—	—	—	—	—	—
22 (Note: Roberts wore number 15 through December 23.)	David Roberts‡	LW	28	1	6	7	−7	12	—	—	—	—	—	—
27	Steve Leach†	RW	14	2	4	6	−3	22	11	3	2	5	4	10
18	Tony Twist	LW	51	3	2	5	−1	100	10	1	1	2	0	16
37	Roman Vopat‡	C	25	2	3	5	−8	48	—	—	—	—	—	—
10	Esa Tikkanen‡	LW	11	1	4	5	1	18	—	—	—	—	—	—
36	Glenn Anderson†	RW	15	2	2	4	−11	6	11	1	4	5	5	6
36	J. J. Daigneault†‡	D	37	1	3	4	−6	24	—	—	—	—	—	—
27	Denis Chasse‡	RW	42	3	0	3	−9	108	—	—	—	—	—	—
37 (Note: Tardiff wore number 21 in his first five games.)	Patrice Tardif‡	C	23	3	0	3	−2	12	—	—	—	—	—	—
26	Jay Wells	D	76	0	3	3	−8	67	12	0	1	1	0	2
17	Basil McRae	LW	18	1	1	2	−5	40	2	0	0	0	0	0
21	Paul Broten	RW	17	0	1	1	−1	4	—	—	—	—	—	—
4	Dallas Eakins‡	D	16	0	1	1	−2	34	—	—	—	—	—	—
31	Grant Fuhr	G	79	0	1	1		8	2	0	0	0		0
7	Greg Gilbert	LW	17	0	1	1	−1	8	—	—	—	—	—	—
13	Yuri Khmylev†	LW	7	0	1	1	−5	0	6	1	1	2	1	4
23 (Note: MacTavish wore number 22 in his first game.)	Craig MacTavish†	C	13	0	1	1	−6	8	13	0	2	2	0	6
30	Jon Casey	G	9	0	0	0		0	12	0	2	2		8
32	Donald Dufresne‡	D	3	0	0	0	−2	4	—	—	—	—	—	—
22	Charlie Huddy†	D	12	0	0	0	−7	6	13	1	0	1	1	8
1	Pat Jablonski‡	G	1	0	0	0		0	—	—	—	—	—	—
33	Fred Knipscheer	C	1	0	0	0	0	2	—	—	—	—	—	—
29	Bruce Racine	G	11	0	0	0		2	1	0	0	0		0
6	Jamie Rivers	D	3	0	0	0	−1	2	—	—	—	—	—	—
12 (Note: Sawyer wore number 36 in his first three games.)	Kevin Sawyer‡	LW	6	0	0	0	−2	23	—	—	—	—	—	—
33	Ken Sutton†	D	6	0	0	0	−1	4	1	0	0	0	0	0
41	Alexander Vasilevski	RW	1	0	0	0	−1	0	—	—	—	—	—	—

=== Goaltending ===
- ‡ = Left team via a transaction (e.g., trade, waivers, release) during the season. Stats reflect time with the Blues only.

No.	Player	Regular season										Playoffs								
No.	Player	GP	W	L	T	SA	GA	GAA	SV%	SO	TOI	GP	W	L	SA	GA	GAA	SV%	SO	TOI
31	Grant Fuhr	79	30	28	16	2157	209	2.87	.903	3	4365	2	1	0	45	1	0.87	.978	0	69
30	Jon Casey	9	2	3	0	180	25	3.80	.861	0	395	12	6	6	378	36	2.89	.905	1	747
1	Pat Jablonski‡	1	0	0	0	5	1	7.83	.800	0	8	—	—	—	—	—	—	—	—	—
29	Bruce Racine	11	0	3	0	101	12	3.13	.881	0	230	1	0	0	0	0	0.00		0	1

== Awards and records ==
=== Awards ===
Type	Award/honor	Recipient	Ref
League (in-season)	NHL All-Star Game selection	Brett Hull (Note: Hull was voted to the starting lineup.)	
League (in-season)	NHL All-Star Game selection	Al MacInnis	

=== Milestones ===
Milestone	Player	Date	Ref
First game	Jamie Rivers	October 7, 1995	
First game	Roman Vopat	October 7, 1995	
First game	Kevin Sawyer	October 25, 1995	
First game	Bruce Racine	November 18, 1995	
First game	Christer Olsson	January 4, 1996	
First game	Alexander Vasilevski	January 16, 1996	
600th assist	Glenn Anderson	April 8, 1996	

== Transactions ==
- July 28, 1995 – Doug Lidster was traded by the St. Louis Blues to the New York Rangers in exchange for Jay Wells.

== Draft picks ==
The 1995 NHL entry draft was held at Edmonton Coliseum in Edmonton, Canada. The drafting order was now set partially by a lottery system whereby teams would not be guaranteed first pick if they finished last.

Round	Pick	Name	Nationality	College/junior/club team
2	49	Jochen Hecht (LW)	Germany	Adler Mannheim (DEL)
3	75	Scott Roche (G)	Canada	North Bay Centennials (OHL)
4	101	Michal Handzus (C)	Slovakia	Iskra Banská Bystrica (Slovakia)
5	127	Jeffrey Ambrosio (LW)	Canada	Belleville Bulls (OHL)
6	153	Denis Hamel (LW)	Canada	Chicoutimi Saguenéens (QMJHL)
7	179	Jean-Luc Grand-Pierre (D)	Canada	Val-d'Or Foreurs (QMJHL)
8	205	Derek Bekar (C)	Canada	Powell River Paper Kings (BCJHL)
9	209	Libor Zabransky (D)	Czech Republic	HC České Budějovice (Czech Republic)

== See also ==
- 1995–96 NHL season
