= Brian Wesenberg =

Canadian ice hockey player (born 1977)

- Born: May 9, 1977 (age 49) Peterborough, Ontario, Canada
- Height: 6 ft 3 in (191 cm)
- Weight: 187 lb (85 kg; 13 st 5 lb)
- Position: Right wing
- Shot: Right
- Played for: Philadelphia Flyers
- NHL draft: 29th overall, 1995; Mighty Ducks of Anaheim
- Playing career: 1997–2001

Brian Wesenberg (born May 9, 1977) is a retired Canadian professional ice hockey player. He appeared in a single National Hockey League (NHL) game with the Philadelphia Flyers during the 1998–99 season. He hails from Peterborough, Ontario.

== Playing career ==
Wesenberg was selected in the second round of the 1995 NHL entry draft by the Mighty Ducks of Anaheim. In March 1996, Anaheim traded its NHL rights to the Philadelphia Flyers in exchange for Anatoli Semenov and Mike Crowley. He signed with the Flyers that summer and began his pro career with their American Hockey League affiliate, the Philadelphia Phantoms, during the 1997 Calder Cup playoffs. He later helped the Phantoms capture the Calder Cup championship in 1998.

Late in the 1998–99 season, Wesenberg was called up by the Flyers and made his NHL debut on April 10 against the Washington Capitals. In what turned out to be his only NHL appearance, he logged just two shifts for a total of 1 minute and 8 seconds before exiting the game with a mild concussion sustained during a fight with Washington's Trevor Halverson.

Two months into the 1999–2000 season, the Flyers traded Wesenberg to the newly established Atlanta Thrashers in exchange for forward Eric Bertrand. Following the trade, Wesenberg was assigned to Atlanta's minor league system, where he split time between affiliates in the American Hockey League (AHL) and the International Hockey League (IHL). Despite efforts to work his way back to the NHL, he was unable to secure another call-up. After spending the 2000–01 season in the minors and facing ongoing injuries, Wesenberg chose to retire from professional hockey in 2001.

== Awards ==
- 1994–95 – OHL – Second All-Rookie Team

== Career statistics ==
=== Regular season and playoffs ===
| | | | Regular season | | | | | Playoffs |
| Season | Team | League | GP | G | A | Pts | PIM | GP | G | A | Pts | PIM |
|---|---|---|---|---|---|---|---|---|---|---|---|---|
| 1993–94 | Cobourg Cougars | OPJHL | 40 | 14 | 18 | 32 | 81 | — | — | — | — | — |
| 1994–95 | Guelph Storm | OHL | 66 | 17 | 27 | 44 | 81 | 14 | 2 | 3 | 5 | 18 |
| 1995–96 | Guelph Storm | OHL | 66 | 25 | 33 | 58 | 161 | 16 | 4 | 11 | 15 | 34 |
| 1996–97 | Guelph Storm | OHL | 64 | 37 | 43 | 80 | 186 | 18 | 4 | 9 | 13 | 59 |
| 1996–97 | Philadelphia Phantoms | AHL | — | — | — | — | — | 3 | 0 | 0 | 0 | 7 |
| 1997–98 | Philadelphia Phantoms | AHL | 74 | 17 | 22 | 39 | 93 | 19 | 1 | 4 | 5 | 34 |
| 1998–99 | Philadelphia Phantoms | AHL | 71 | 23 | 20 | 43 | 169 | 16 | 5 | 3 | 8 | 28 |
| 1998–99 | Philadelphia Flyers | NHL | 1 | 0 | 0 | 0 | 5 | — | — | — | — | — |
| 1999–00 | Philadelphia Phantoms | AHL | 22 | 3 | 5 | 8 | 44 | — | — | — | — | — |
| 1999–00 | Orlando Solar Bears | IHL | 31 | 9 | 3 | 12 | 50 | 4 | 0 | 0 | 0 | 9 |
| 2000–01 | Orlando Solar Bears | IHL | 12 | 2 | 0 | 2 | 19 | — | — | — | — | — |
| 2000–01 | Greenville Grrrowl | ECHL | 4 | 0 | 0 | 0 | 7 | — | — | — | — | — |
| NHL totals | | | 1 | 0 | 0 | 0 | 5 | — | — | — | — | — |

== See also ==
- List of players who played only one game in the NHL
