= 1995–96 Vancouver Canucks season =

26th season in franchise history

1995–96 Vancouver Canucks
- Division: 3rd Pacific
- Conference: 7th Western
- 1995–96 record: 32–35–15
- Home record: 15–19–7
- Road record: 17–16–8
- Goals for: 278
- Goals against: 278

Team information
- General manager: Pat Quinn
- Coach: Rick Ley (Oct.–Mar.); Pat Quinn (Mar.–Apr.)
- Captain: Trevor Linden
- Alternate captains: Dave Babych; Pavel Bure; Martin Gelinas; Dana Murzyn
- Arena: General Motors Place
- Average attendance: 17,795
- Minor league affiliate: Syracuse Crunch

Team leaders
- Goals: Alexander Mogilny (55)
- Assists: Alexander Mogilny (52)
- Points: Alexander Mogilny (107)
- Penalty minutes: Gino Odjick (181)
- Plus/minus: Russ Courtnall (+25)
- Wins: Corey Hirsch (17)
- Goals against average: Corey Hirsch (2.93)

The 1995–96 Vancouver Canucks season was the Canucks' 26th season in the National Hockey League (NHL). It marked the year they played their first season in General Motors Place, the year future star Markus Naslund joined the team, and Cliff Ronning's final season with the Canucks.

== Regular season ==
On March 28, head coach Rick Ley was fired with six games left in the regular season.

=== Standings ===
Pacific Division
No.		GP	W	L	T	GF	GA	Pts
1	**Colorado Avalanche**	82	47	25	10	326	240	104
2	**Calgary Flames**	82	34	37	11	241	240	79
3	**Vancouver Canucks**	82	32	35	15	278	278	79
4	Mighty Ducks of Anaheim	82	35	39	8	234	247	78
5	Edmonton Oilers	82	30	44	8	240	304	68
6	Los Angeles Kings	82	24	40	18	256	302	66
7	San Jose Sharks	82	20	55	7	252	357	47

Note: GP = Games played; W = Wins; L = Losses; T = Ties; GF = Goals for; GA = Goals against; Pts = Points
Bolded teams qualified for the playoffs.

Western Conference
R		Div	GP	W	L	T	GF	GA	Pts
**1**	**p – Detroit Red Wings**	**CEN**	**82**	**62**	**13**	**7**	**325**	**181**	**131**
**2**	**Colorado Avalanche**	**PAC**	**82**	**47**	**25**	**10**	**326**	**240**	**104**
**3**	**Chicago Blackhawks**	**CEN**	**82**	**40**	**28**	**14**	**273**	**220**	**94**
**4**	**Toronto Maple Leafs**	**CEN**	**82**	**34**	**36**	**12**	**247**	**252**	**80**
**5**	**St. Louis Blues**	**CEN**	**82**	**32**	**34**	**16**	**219**	**248**	**80**
**6**	**Calgary Flames**	**PAC**	**82**	**34**	**37**	**11**	**241**	**240**	**79**
**7**	**Vancouver Canucks**	**PAC**	**82**	**32**	**35**	**15**	**278**	**278**	**79**
**8**	**Winnipeg Jets**	**CEN**	**82**	**36**	**40**	**6**	**275**	**291**	**78**
9	Mighty Ducks of Anaheim	PAC	82	35	39	8	234	247	78
10	Edmonton Oilers	PAC	82	30	44	8	240	304	68
11	Dallas Stars	CEN	82	26	42	14	227	280	66
12	Los Angeles Kings	PAC	82	24	40	18	256	302	66
13	San Jose Sharks	PAC	82	20	55	7	252	357	47

Divisions: CEN – Central, PAC – Pacific

bold – Qualified for playoffs; p – Won Presidents' Trophy

== Schedule and results ==
=== Regular season ===
1995–96 regular season
October: 4–4–2 (home: 1–2–1; road: 3–2–1)

Game	Date	Score	Opponent	Record	Recap
1	October 9, 1995	3–5	Detroit Red Wings (1995–96)	0–1–0	L
2	October 12, 1995	7–7 OT	@ Los Angeles Kings (1995–96)	0–1–1	T
3	October 14, 1995	7–6	@ San Jose Sharks (1995–96)	1–1–1	W
4	October 15, 1995	3–3 OT	Los Angeles Kings (1995–96)	1–1–2	T
5	October 18, 1995	5–1	@ Mighty Ducks of Anaheim (1995–96)	2–1–2	W
6	October 21, 1995	4–6	@ Edmonton Oilers (1995–96)	2–2–2	L
7	October 24, 1995	2–5	@ New York Rangers (1995–96)	2–3–2	L
8	October 25, 1995	4–2	@ New Jersey Devils (1995–96)	3–3–2	W
9	October 28, 1995	1–4	Winnipeg Jets (1995–96)	3–4–2	L
10	October 30, 1995	4–3	San Jose Sharks (1995–96)	4–4–2	W

November: 2–7–5 (home: 0–2–3; road: 2–5–2)

Game	Date	Score	Opponent	Record	Recap
11	November 1, 1995	3–3 OT	Edmonton Oilers (1995–96)	4–4–3	T
12	November 3, 1995	4–4 OT	Toronto Maple Leafs (1995–96)	4–4–4	T
13	November 4, 1995	4–4 OT	@ Calgary Flames (1995–96)	4–4–5	T
14	November 7, 1995	5–2	@ New York Islanders (1995–96)	5–4–5	W
15	November 9, 1995	2–5	@ Chicago Blackhawks (1995–96)	5–5–5	L
16	November 11, 1995	4–8	Colorado Avalanche (1995–96)	5–6–5	L
17	November 12, 1995	2–4	Montreal Canadiens (1995–96)	5–7–5	L
18	November 16, 1995	2–2 OT	@ Florida Panthers (1995–96)	5–7–6	T
19	November 18, 1995	4–5 OT	@ Tampa Bay Lightning (1995–96)	5–8–6	L
20	November 19, 1995	2–3 OT	@ Philadelphia Flyers (1995–96)	5–9–6	L
21	November 22, 1995	3–4	@ Dallas Stars (1995–96)	5–10–6	L
22	November 23, 1995	3–2	@ St. Louis Blues (1995–96)	6–10–6	W
23	November 25, 1995	2–7	@ San Jose Sharks (1995–96)	6–11–6	L
24	November 29, 1995	2–2 OT	Chicago Blackhawks (1995–96)	6–11–7	T

December: 6–4–3 (home: 3–4–1; road: 3–0–2)

Game	Date	Score	Opponent	Record	Recap
25	December 1, 1995	7–2	San Jose Sharks (1995–96)	7–11–7	W
26	December 5, 1995	6–2	Edmonton Oilers (1995–96)	8–11–7	W
27	December 8, 1995	3–6	St. Louis Blues (1995–96)	8–12–7	L
28	December 9, 1995	4–3	@ Calgary Flames (1995–96)	9–12–7	W
29	December 13, 1995	2–2 OT	@ Edmonton Oilers (1995–96)	9–12–8	T
30	December 17, 1995	4–1	Ottawa Senators (1995–96)	10–12–8	W
31	December 18, 1995	4–2	@ Colorado Avalanche (1995–96)	11–12–8	W
32	December 20, 1995	2–2 OT	@ Los Angeles Kings (1995–96)	11–12–9	T
33	December 22, 1995	6–2	@ Mighty Ducks of Anaheim (1995–96)	12–12–9	W
34	December 23, 1995	0–1	Detroit Red Wings (1995–96)	12–13–9	L
35	December 26, 1995	2–4	Calgary Flames (1995–96)	12–14–9	L
36	December 28, 1995	2–3	New York Rangers (1995–96)	12–15–9	L
37	December 31, 1995	5–5 OT	Philadelphia Flyers (1995–96)	12–15–10	T

January: 5–5–2 (home: 3–3–0; road: 2–2–2)

Game	Date	Score	Opponent	Record	Recap
38	January 3, 1996	7–2	Florida Panthers (1995–96)	13–15–10	W
39	January 6, 1996	9–2	Tampa Bay Lightning (1995–96)	14–15–10	W
40	January 8, 1996	5–8	@ Pittsburgh Penguins (1995–96)	14–16–10	L
41	January 10, 1996	2–2 OT	@ Montreal Canadiens (1995–96)	14–16–11	T
42	January 13, 1996	5–2	@ Toronto Maple Leafs (1995–96)	15–16–11	W
43	January 15, 1996	6–0	@ Boston Bruins (1995–96)	16–16–11	W
44	January 16, 1996	0–3	@ Hartford Whalers (1995–96)	16–17–11	L
45	January 22, 1996	4–6	Dallas Stars (1995–96)	16–18–11	L
46	January 24, 1996	1–2 OT	Mighty Ducks of Anaheim (1995–96)	16–19–11	L
47	January 25, 1996	2–2 OT	@ Colorado Avalanche (1995–96)	16–19–12	T
48	January 27, 1996	6–3	New York Islanders (1995–96)	17–19–12	W
49	January 30, 1996	2–3 OT	New Jersey Devils (1995–96)	17–20–12	L

February: 7–4–3 (home: 3–3–2; road: 4–1–1)

Game	Date	Score	Opponent	Record	Recap
50	February 1, 1996	2–2 OT	@ St. Louis Blues (1995–96)	17–20–13	T
51	February 2, 1996	5–4	@ Dallas Stars (1995–96)	18–20–13	W
52	February 4, 1996	4–2	@ Winnipeg Jets (1995–96)	19–20–13	W
53	February 7, 1996	3–5	Hartford Whalers (1995–96)	19–21–13	L
54	February 9, 1996	3–2 OT	@ Edmonton Oilers (1995–96)	20–21–13	W
55	February 10, 1996	4–4 OT	Washington Capitals (1995–96)	20–21–14	T
56	February 13, 1996	5–4	Winnipeg Jets (1995–96)	21–21–14	W
57	February 15, 1996	5–3	Mighty Ducks of Anaheim (1995–96)	22–21–14	W
58	February 17, 1996	1–4	Boston Bruins (1995–96)	22–22–14	L
59	February 19, 1996	3–4	@ Detroit Red Wings (1995–96)	22–23–14	L
60	February 21, 1996	5–3	@ Winnipeg Jets (1995–96)	23–23–14	W
61	February 23, 1996	3–1	San Jose Sharks (1995–96)	24–23–14	W
62	February 27, 1996	4–7	Pittsburgh Penguins (1995–96)	24–24–14	L
63	February 29, 1996	2–2 OT	St. Louis Blues (1995–96)	24–24–15	T

March: 6–8–0 (home: 4–4–0; road: 2–4–0)

Game	Date	Score	Opponent	Record	Recap
64	March 2, 1996	3–2	@ Detroit Red Wings (1995–96)	25–24–15	W
65	March 3, 1996	3–0	@ Buffalo Sabres (1995–96)	26–24–15	W
66	March 6, 1996	5–2	Buffalo Sabres (1995–96)	27–24–15	W
67	March 9, 1996	5–7	Colorado Avalanche (1995–96)	27–25–15	L
68	March 12, 1996	0–9	@ Washington Capitals (1995–96)	27–26–15	L
69	March 14, 1996	1–5	@ Chicago Blackhawks (1995–96)	27–27–15	L
70	March 15, 1996	0–2	@ Ottawa Senators (1995–96)	27–28–15	L
71	March 17, 1996	2–4	@ Toronto Maple Leafs (1995–96)	27–29–15	L
72	March 19, 1996	3–4	Colorado Avalanche (1995–96)	27–30–15	L
73	March 22, 1996	5–2	Dallas Stars (1995–96)	28–30–15	W
74	March 23, 1996	0–4	Calgary Flames (1995–96)	28–31–15	L
75	March 25, 1996	4–1	Los Angeles Kings (1995–96)	29–31–15	W
76	March 27, 1996	2–6	Toronto Maple Leafs (1995–96)	29–32–15	L
77	March 29, 1996	4–2	Chicago Blackhawks (1995–96)	30–32–15	W

April: 2–3–0 (home: 1–1–0; road: 1–2–0)

Game	Date	Score	Opponent	Record	Recap
78	April 1, 1996	2–6	Edmonton Oilers (1995–96)	30–33–15	L
79	April 3, 1996	3–4	@ Calgary Flames (1995–96)	30–34–15	L
80	April 6, 1996	4–2	@ Los Angeles Kings (1995–96)	31–34–15	W
81	April 8, 1996	0–2	@ Mighty Ducks of Anaheim (1995–96)	31–35–15	L
82	April 13, 1996	5–0	Calgary Flames (1995–96)	32–35–15	W

Legend: W Win (2 points) L Loss (0 points) T Tie (1 point)

=== Playoffs ===
1996 Stanley Cup playoffs
Western Conference Quarterfinals vs. (2) Colorado Avalanche – Avalanche win 4–2

Game	Date	Visitor	Score	Home	OT	Decision	Attendance	Series	Recap
1	April 16	Vancouver	2 – 5	Colorado		McLean	16,061	0 – 1	L
2	April 18	Vancouver	5 – 4	Colorado		Hirsch	16,061	1 – 1	W
3	April 20	Colorado	4 – 0	Vancouver		Hirsch	18,422	1 – 2	L
4	April 22	Colorado	3 – 4	Vancouver		Hirsch	18,422	2 – 2	W
5	April 25	Vancouver	4 – 5	Colorado	OT	Hirsch	16,061	2 – 3	L
6	April 27	Colorado	3 – 2	Vancouver		Hirsch	18,422	2 – 4	L

Legend: W Win L Loss

== Player statistics ==
=== Scoring ===
- Position abbreviations: C = Centre; D = Defence; G = Goaltender; LW = Left wing; RW = Right wing
- † = Joined team via a transaction (e.g., trade, waivers, signing) during the season. Stats reflect time with the Canucks only.
- ‡ = Left team via a transaction (e.g., trade, waivers, release) during the season. Stats reflect time with the Canucks only.

No.	Player	Pos	Regular season						Playoffs					
No.	Player	Pos	GP	G	A	Pts	+/-	PIM	GP	G	A	Pts	+/-	PIM
89	Alexander Mogilny	RW	79	55	52	107	14	16	6	1	8	9	−1	8
16	Trevor Linden	C	82	33	47	80	6	42	6	4	4	8	−1	6
7	Cliff Ronning	C	79	22	45	67	16	42	6	0	2	2	0	6
9	Russ Courtnall	RW	81	26	39	65	25	40	6	1	3	4	−4	2
23	Martin Gelinas	LW	81	30	26	56	8	59	6	1	1	2	−1	12
21	Jyrki Lumme	D	80	17	37	54	−9	50	6	1	3	4	−1	2
28	Roman Oksiuta‡	RW	56	16	23	39	2	42	—	—	—	—	—	—
10	Esa Tikkanen†	LW	38	13	24	37	6	14	6	3	2	5	−3	2
3	Bret Hedican	D	77	6	23	29	8	83	6	0	1	1	−2	10
44	Dave Babych	D	53	3	21	24	−5	38	—	—	—	—	—	—
27	Leif Rohlin	D	56	6	16	22	0	32	5	0	0	0	−1	0
17	Mike Ridley	C	37	6	15	21	−3	29	5	0	0	0	−3	2
42	Josef Beranek	LW	61	6	14	20	−11	60	3	2	1	3	0	0
6	Adrian Aucoin	D	49	4	14	18	8	34	6	0	0	0	−5	2
22	Jeff Brown‡	D	28	1	16	17	6	18	—	—	—	—	—	—
96	Pavel Bure	LW	15	6	7	13	−2	8	—	—	—	—	—	—
24	Scott Walker	D	63	4	8	12	−7	137	—	—	—	—	—	—
5	Dana Murzyn	D	69	2	10	12	9	130	6	0	0	0	0	25
29	Gino Odjick	LW	55	3	4	7	−16	181	6	3	1	4	2	6
15	Jim Dowd†	C	38	1	6	7	−8	6	1	0	0	0	−1	0
25	Jim Sandlak	RW	33	4	2	6	−3	6	5	0	0	0	2	2
36	Brian Loney	RW	12	2	3	5	2	6	—	—	—	—	—	—
26	Mike Sillinger†	RW	12	1	3	4	2	6	6	0	0	0	−5	2
14	Jesse Belanger†	C	9	3	0	3	0	4	3	0	2	2	0	2
22	Markus Naslund†	LW	10	3	0	3	3	6	6	1	2	3	−2	8
19	Tim Hunter	RW	60	2	0	2	−8	122	—	—	—	—	—	—
34	Jassen Cullimore	D	27	1	1	2	4	21	—	—	—	—	—	—
31	Corey Hirsch	G	41	0	2	2		2	6	0	0	0		2
32	Dean Malkoc	D	41	0	2	2	−10	136	—	—	—	—	—	—
1	Kirk McLean	G	45	0	2	2		6	1	0	0	0		0
14	Larry Courville	LW	3	1	0	1	1	0	—	—	—	—	—	—
2	Frantisek Kucera†	D	24	1	0	1	5	10	6	0	1	1	−3	0
14	Lonny Bohonos	RW	3	0	1	1	1	0	—	—	—	—	—	—
28	Joe Kocur†	RW	7	0	1	1	−3	19	1	0	0	0	0	0
8	Alek Stojanov‡	RW	58	0	1	1	−12	123	—	—	—	—	—	—
20	Evgeny Namestnikov	D	—	—	—	—	—	—	1	0	0	0	0	0

=== Goaltending ===
No.	Player	Regular season										Playoffs								
No.	Player	GP	W	L	T	SA	GA	GAA	SV%	SO	TOI	GP	W	L	SA	GA	GAA	SV%	SO	TOI
31	Corey Hirsch	41	17	14	6	1173	114	2.93	.903	1	2338	6	2	3	166	21	3.73	.873	0	338
1	Kirk McLean	45	15	21	9	1292	156	3.54	.879	2	2645	1	0	1	12	3	8.62	.750	0	21

== Awards and records ==
=== Awards ===
Type	Award/honour	Recipient	Ref
League (annual)	NHL All-Rookie Team	Corey Hirsch (Goaltender)	
League (annual)	NHL Second All-Star team	Alexander Mogilny (Right wing	
League (in-season)	NHL All-Star Game selection	Pavel Bure (Note: Bure was voted to the starting lineup but did not play.)	
League (in-season)	NHL All-Star Game selection	Alexander Mogilny	
Team	Babe Pratt Trophy	Jyrki Lumme	
Team	Cyclone Taylor Trophy	Trevor Linden	
Team	Cyrus H. McLean Trophy	Alexander Mogilny	
Team	Fred J. Hume Award	Martin Gelinas	
Team	Molson Cup	Trevor Linden	
Team	Most Exciting Player Award	Alexander Mogilny	

=== Milestones ===
Milestone	Player	Date	Ref
First game	Dean Malkoc	October 9, 1995	
First game	Leif Rohlin	October 9, 1995	
First game	Lonny Bohonos	November 11, 1995	
First game	Brian Loney	November 29, 1995	
First game	Larry Courville	December 13, 1995	
1,000th game played	Dave Babych	February 7, 1996	

== Transactions ==
=== Trades ===
July 8, 1995	To Vancouver Canucks Alexander Mogilny; 5th round pick in 1995 (Todd Norman)	To Buffalo Sabres Michael Peca; Mike Wilson; 1st round pick in 1995 (Jay McKee)
July 8, 1995	To Vancouver Canucks Mike Ridley	To Toronto Maple Leafs Sergio Momesso
November 23, 1995	To Vancouver Canucks Esa Tikkanen	To New Jersey Devils 2nd round pick in 1996 (Wesley Mason)
December 19, 1995	To Vancouver Canucks Jim Dowd; Frantisek Kucera; 2nd round pick in 1997 (Ryan Bonni)	To Hartford Whalers Jeff Brown; 3rd round pick in 1998 (Paul Manning)
March 15, 1996	To Vancouver Canucks Mike Sillinger	To Mighty Ducks of Anaheim Roman Oksiuta
March 20, 1996	To Vancouver Canucks Jesse Belanger	To Florida Panthers 3rd round pick in 1996 (Oleg Kvasha); Future considerations
March 20, 1996	To Vancouver Canucks Joe Kocur	To New York Rangers Kay Whitmore
March 20, 1996	To Vancouver Canucks Markus Naslund	To Pittsburgh Penguins Alek Stojanov

== Draft picks ==
Vancouver's picks at the 1995 NHL entry draft in Edmonton, Alberta.

Round	#	Player	Nationality	NHL team	College/Junior/Club team (League)
2	40	Chris McAllister (D)	Canada	Vancouver Canucks	Saskatoon Blades (WHL)
3	61	Larry Courville (LW)	Canada	Vancouver Canucks (from Chicago via Hartford)	Oshawa Generals (OHL)
3	66	Peter Schaefer (LW)	Canada	Vancouver Canucks	Brandon Wheat Kings (WHL)
4	92	Lloyd Shaw (D)	Canada	Vancouver Canucks	Seattle Thunderbirds (WHL)
5	120	Todd Norman (LW)	Canada	Vancouver Canucks (from Buffalo)	Guelph Storm (OHL)
6	144	Brent Sopel (D)	Canada	Vancouver Canucks	Swift Current Broncos (WHL)
7	170	Stu Boedker (C)	Canada	Vancouver Canucks	Colorado College (WCHA)
8	196	Tyler Willis (RW)	Canada	Vancouver Canucks	Swift Current Broncos (WHL)
9	222	Jason Cugnet (G)	Canada	Vancouver Canucks	Kelowna Spartans (BCJHL)
