= Todd Ewen =

Canadian ice hockey player (1966–2015)

- Born: March 22, 1966 Saskatoon, Saskatchewan, Canada
- Died: September 19, 2015 (aged 49) Wildwood, Missouri, U.S.
- Height: 6 ft 3 in (191 cm)
- Weight: 230 lb (104 kg; 16 st 6 lb)
- Position: Right wing
- Shot: Right
- Played for: St. Louis Blues; Montreal Canadiens; Mighty Ducks of Anaheim; San Jose Sharks
- NHL draft: 168th overall, 1984; Edmonton Oilers
- Playing career: 1986–1997

Todd Gordon Ewen (March 22, 1966 – September 19, 2015) was a Canadian professional ice hockey player who played for several teams in the National Hockey League (NHL). A right wing, Ewen was primarily known as an enforcer. He played for the St. Louis Blues, Montreal Canadiens, Mighty Ducks of Anaheim and San Jose Sharks. Ewen retired with 1,914 penalty minutes, putting him 61st for all-time career penalty minutes. He was born in Saskatoon, Saskatchewan, and raised in St. Albert, Alberta. Ewen won the Stanley Cup in 1993 with the Canadiens.

After leaving his professional career, Ewen made several coaching videos with Championship Productions. He also was coaching director for the Chesterfield Hockey Association, Lafayette Varsity head coach and assistant coach for the Saint Louis University Billikens.

In 2015, after allegedly suffering from depression for several years, Ewen killed himself. His family wondered if he might have endured chronic traumatic encephalopathy (CTE) as a result of concussions he had sustained during his playing career, like some other recently deceased NHL enforcers. Although initial tests of his brain came back negative for CTE, subsequent examinations completed by Boston University medical staff did confirm the existence of lesions consistent with stage 2 CTE.

== Junior career ==
As a youth, Ewen played in the 1979 Quebec International Pee-Wee Hockey Tournament with a minor ice hockey team from St. Albert, Alberta.

Ewen started his junior career with the Kamloops Junior Oilers at age 16. He started the season in Kamloops but was traded to the Nanaimo Lakers at the end of the season. That was the last year that the team was in Nanaimo and they then moved back to New Westminster. Ewen played three years for the New Westminster Bruins of the Western Hockey League (WHL), where he was awarded the most improved player by the WHL and served as his team's assistant captain. At New Westminster, Ewen was teammates with future NHL players Mark Recchi, Bill Ranford, Cliff Ronning and Brian Noonan, as well as with his younger brother Dean, who went on to be a career minor league enforcer.

In his last year with the Bruins Ewen had 6 points and over 200 minutes in penalties by Christmas. Oilers head scout Barry Fraser flew in to see Ewen's performance. Ewen ended up with 52 points and 289 minutes in penalties. When the season ended with New Westminster, Ewen was loaned to the Maine Mariners for the playoffs. He centered a line which had Archie Henderson and Mitch Wilson as line mates. He was selected by the Edmonton Oilers in the eighth round, 168th overall, of the 1984 draft.

== Professional career ==
Ewen never played for the Oilers but was called up to the team for the 1985 Stanley Cup playoffs. At the beginning of the next season, Ewen was assigned to the minors in Nova Scotia where he had a run-in with coach Larry Kish. He was later traded to the St. Louis Blues.

He played parts of four years with St. Louis and had one of his most memorable fights, with Bob Probert. In his second fight in the National Hockey League, he knocked out Probert with one punch. This was the first of several battles with Probert. He was traded to the Montreal Canadiens in 1990 in their attempt to add an enforcer to the team for a Stanley Cup run. He played four seasons for Montreal, which culminated in a Stanley Cup championship in 1993. Before the start of the 1994 season, he was traded to the Mighty Ducks of Anaheim after the expansion draft and was the first trade made by the Mighty Ducks of Anaheim along with Patrik Carnback. He spent the two seasons protecting the team's star players, Paul Kariya and Teemu Selänne, along with his partner, Stu Grimson. During this time with the Mighty Ducks, Ewen served as the assistant captain for all three years. The Mighty Ducks achieved a record for the winningest expansion franchise team in NHL history. After three years with the Mighty Ducks, Ewen joined the San Jose Sharks as a free agent in 1996–97, his last season in the NHL. His career ended with double knee surgery. After missing two seasons he attempted a comeback on a training camp tryout with the Phoenix Coyotes, but officially retired after only one day.

== Coaching career ==
Ewen was involved in coaching after his retirement. Having moved back to St. Louis, he became involved in the local Chesterfield Hockey Association and was the coaching director for three years. He also was involved in doing coaching seminars with USA hockey for levels 1-3 along with other St Louis Blues alumni Rob Ramage, Mike Zuke and Rick Zombo. During his tenure with Chesterfield hockey, Ewen was the head coach for every level from mini-mite to midget major central states. The opportunity to get involved in high school hockey was a welcome change and Ewen moved to Lafayette High School for three years.

In 2008, he also began serving as the assistant coach for the Saint Louis University Billikens Men's Ice Hockey Club and took over in 2009 as the head coach. He led the team to a 2011 MACHA Gold championship (the first in club history) and a Central Regional qualifier.

== Death ==
Ewen died suddenly on September 19, 2015, at the age of 49. The next day, numerous media outlets reported Ewen committed suicide via a self-inflicted gunshot wound to the head. Ewen's family would later report that he had allegedly been suffering from depression for several years. On February 10, 2016, it was reported that Ewen's results from a chronic traumatic encephalopathy (CTE) examination performed by Lili-Naz Hazrati, a researcher in Toronto with the Canadian Sports Concussion Project, came back negative and that Ewen's widow had been given the results the month before. However, at the request of Ewen's wife, Boston University's Ann Mckee reexamined Ewen's brain using a more extensive test. CTE was found in the frontal cortex section of Ewen's brain and that "the staging was considered to be consistent with Stage 2 of the disease."

== Awards and achievements ==
- 1993 Stanley Cup Championship (Montreal)
- Anaheim Ducks team record: Most penalty minutes in one season (285 in 1995-96)

== Career statistics ==
			Regular season					Playoffs
Season	Team	League	GP	G	A	Pts	PIM	GP	G	A	Pts	PIM
1982–83	Kamloops Junior Oilers	WHL	3	0	0	0	2	2	0	0	0	0
1982-82	Vernon Lakers	BCJHL	42	14	10	24	178	—	—	—	—	—
1983–84	New Westminster Bruins	WHL	68	11	13	24	176	7	1	2	3	15
1984–85	New Westminster Bruins	WHL	56	11	20	31	304	10	1	8	9	60
1985–86	New Westminster Bruins	WHL	60	28	24	52	289	—	—	—	—	—
1985–86	Maine Mariners	AHL	—	—	—	—	—	3	0	0	0	7
1986–87	Peoria Rivermen	IHL	16	3	3	6	110	—	—	—	—	—
1986–87	St. Louis Blues	NHL	23	2	0	2	84	4	0	0	0	23
1987–88	St. Louis Blues	NHL	64	4	2	6	227	6	0	0	0	21
1988–89	St. Louis Blues	NHL	34	4	5	9	171	2	0	0	0	21
1989–90	Peoria Rivermen	IHL	2	0	0	0	12	—	—	—	—	—
1989–90	St. Louis Blues	NHL	3	0	0	0	11	—	—	—	—	—
1989-90	Montreal Canadiens	NHL	41	4	6	10	158	10	0	0	0	4
1990–91	Montreal Canadiens	NHL	28	3	2	5	128	—	—	—	—	—
1991–92	Montreal Canadiens	NHL	46	1	2	3	130	3	0	0	0	18
1992–93	Montreal Canadiens	NHL	75	5	9	14	193	1	0	0	0	0
1993–94	Mighty Ducks of Anaheim	NHL	79	9	9	18	272	—	—	—	—	—
1994–95	Mighty Ducks of Anaheim	NHL	24	0	0	0	93	—	—	—	—	—
1995–96	Mighty Ducks of Anaheim	NHL	53	4	3	7	285	—	—	—	—	—
1996–97	San Jose Sharks	NHL	51	0	2	2	162	—	—	—	—	—
NHL totals			518	36	40	76	1914	26	0	0	0	87
