= 1995–96 Calgary Flames season =

NHL team season

1995–96 Calgary Flames
- Division: 2nd Pacific
- Conference: 6th Western
- 1995–96 record: 34–37–11
- Home record: 18–18–5
- Road record: 16–19–6
- Goals for: 241
- Goals against: 240

Team information
- General manager: Doug Risebrough (Oct.–Nov.); Al Coates (Nov.–Apr.)
- Coach: Pierre Page
- Captain: Theoren Fleury
- Arena: Canadian Airlines Saddledome
- Average attendance: 18,000
- Minor league affiliate: Saint John Flames

Team leaders
- Goals: Theoren Fleury (46)
- Assists: Theoren Fleury (50)
- Points: Theoren Fleury (96)
- Penalty minutes: Sandy McCarthy (173)
- Plus/minus: Theoren Fleury (+17)
- Wins: Rick Tabaracci (19)
- Goals against average: Trevor Kidd (2.78)

The 1995–96 Calgary Flames season was the 16th National Hockey League season in Calgary. The Flames entered the season with their fifth coach in five seasons, hiring Pierre Page to replace Dave King. Page, who had previously been an assistant coach with the Flames in the 1980s, left his head coaching position with the Quebec Nordiques to move west.

The Flames began the season with a disastrous start, posting a 4–15–5 record through the end of November. The team's poor start was exacerbated by the holdout of Joe Nieuwendyk, who was unable to reach a contract agreement with the Flames. Also, the Flames began the season on a long, seven game road trip while renovations to the Olympic Saddledome were completed. The Flames reached a low point on October 27, 1995, when they set a franchise record for futility, recording just eight shots in a 3–0 loss to the Detroit Red Wings on home ice.

The Nieuwendyk saga finally came to a close when the Flames dealt him to the Dallas Stars for Corey Millen, and Western Hockey League star Jarome Iginla on December 19. Nieuwendyk immediately ended his holdout, signing a five-year, $11 million contract with Dallas.

The Flames began to turn the season around, led by Gary Roberts' comeback from neck injuries that had kept him out most of the 1994–95 season. Roberts' comeback lasted only 35 games before he was again sidelined with bone spurs and nerve damage in his neck. Roberts would score an incredible 22 goals and 42 points during that time, earning him the Bill Masterton Memorial Trophy for perseverance and dedication to hockey.

The Flames recovered from their woeful start to finish second in the Pacific Division, and as the sixth seed in the Western Conference. The Flames were swept, however, by the Chicago Blackhawks in the first round of the playoffs, as the team once again failed to win a playoff series since they won the Stanley Cup in 1989. One notable player made his debut during the playoffs: Jarome Iginla, who would become a star for the Flames for years to come. The Flames would not qualify for the playoffs again until 2004, missing the post season for the next seven years.

Theoren Fleury represented the Flames at the 46th National Hockey League All-Star Game. It was the first since 1986 that the Flames had only one representative.

== Regular season ==
=== Season standings ===
Pacific Division
No.		GP	W	L	T	GF	GA	Pts
1	**Colorado Avalanche**	82	47	25	10	326	240	104
2	**Calgary Flames**	82	34	37	11	241	240	79
3	**Vancouver Canucks**	82	32	35	15	278	278	79
4	Mighty Ducks of Anaheim	82	35	39	8	234	247	78
5	Edmonton Oilers	82	30	44	8	240	304	68
6	Los Angeles Kings	82	24	40	18	256	302	66
7	San Jose Sharks	82	20	55	7	252	357	47

Note: GP = Games played; W = Wins; L = Losses; T = Ties; GF = Goals for; GA = Goals against; Pts = Points
Bolded teams qualified for the playoffs.

Western Conference
R		Div	GP	W	L	T	GF	GA	Pts
**1**	**p – Detroit Red Wings**	**CEN**	**82**	**62**	**13**	**7**	**325**	**181**	**131**
**2**	**Colorado Avalanche**	**PAC**	**82**	**47**	**25**	**10**	**326**	**240**	**104**
**3**	**Chicago Blackhawks**	**CEN**	**82**	**40**	**28**	**14**	**273**	**220**	**94**
**4**	**Toronto Maple Leafs**	**CEN**	**82**	**34**	**36**	**12**	**247**	**252**	**80**
**5**	**St. Louis Blues**	**CEN**	**82**	**32**	**34**	**16**	**219**	**248**	**80**
**6**	**Calgary Flames**	**PAC**	**82**	**34**	**37**	**11**	**241**	**240**	**79**
**7**	**Vancouver Canucks**	**PAC**	**82**	**32**	**35**	**15**	**278**	**278**	**79**
**8**	**Winnipeg Jets**	**CEN**	**82**	**36**	**40**	**6**	**275**	**291**	**78**
9	Mighty Ducks of Anaheim	PAC	82	35	39	8	234	247	78
10	Edmonton Oilers	PAC	82	30	44	8	240	304	68
11	Dallas Stars	CEN	82	26	42	14	227	280	66
12	Los Angeles Kings	PAC	82	24	40	18	256	302	66
13	San Jose Sharks	PAC	82	20	55	7	252	357	47

Divisions: CEN – Central, PAC – Pacific

bold – Qualified for playoffs; p – Won Presidents' Trophy

== Playoffs ==
Despite finishing 2nd in the Pacific Division, the Flames were only the 6th seed in the playoffs. They met the 2nd-place finisher in the Central Division, the Chicago Blackhawks. It was the third time Calgary and Chicago had met in the playoffs, as the Flames had previously defeated the Blackhawks in 1981, and 1989. This time around, Chicago had the better of the Flames, sweeping Calgary out in four straight, and continuing the Flames playoff futility.

Looking for a spark, the Flames signed junior star Jarome Iginla to a contract before the third game, allowing him to make his NHL debut at home. Iginla scored a goal and an assist in his first two games.

This series was the Flames last playoff appearance for eight years, as Calgary did not return to the post season until 2004.

== Schedule and results ==
=== Regular season ===
1995–96 regular season
October: 1–7–3 (home: 0–2–0; road: 1–5–3)

Game	Date	Visitor	Score	Home	OT	Decision	Attendance	Record	Pts	Recap
1	October 7	Calgary	3 – 3	Tampa Bay	OT	Kidd	22,735	0–0–1	1	T
2	October 8	Calgary	3 – 4	Florida		Tabaracci	N/A	0–1–1	1	L
3	October 10	Calgary	3 – 7	Dallas		Kidd	15,702	0–2–1	1	L
4	October 15	Calgary	1 – 1	Chicago	OT	Kidd	17,309	0–2–2	2	T
5	October 17	Calgary	3 – 3	Detroit	OT	Kidd	19,638	0–2–3	3	T
6	October 19	Calgary	2 – 4	Ottawa		Kidd	8,424	0–3–3	3	L
7	October 20	Calgary	3 – 4	Toronto	OT	Tabaracci	15,746	0–4–3	3	L
8	October 25	Colorado	3 – 2	Calgary		Kidd	19,152	0–5–3	3	L
9	October 27	Detroit	3 – 0	Calgary		Kidd	N/A	0–6–3	3	L
10	October 29	Calgary	2 – 7	Anaheim		Kidd	17,060	0–7–3	3	L
11	October 31	Calgary	2 – 1	Los Angeles		Tabaracci	11,241	1–7–3	5	W

November: 3–8–2 (home: 1–4–2; road: 2–4–0)

Game	Date	Visitor	Score	Home	OT	Decision	Attendance	Record	Pts	Recap
12	November 1	Calgary	1 – 6	Colorado		Tabaracci	15,390	1–8–3	5	L
13	November 4	Vancouver	4 – 4	Calgary	OT	Kidd	18,717	1–8–4	6	T
14	November 6	Calgary	2 – 4	NY Rangers		Tabaracci	18,200	1–9–4	6	L
15	November 8	Calgary	2 – 1	New Jersey		Kidd	15,611	2–9–4	8	W
16	November 9	Calgary	1 – 3	Philadelphia		Kidd	17,255	2–10–4	8	L
17	November 11	Montreal	4 – 0	Calgary		Kidd	19,646	2–11–4	8	L
18	November 14	Edmonton	2 – 4	Calgary		Kidd	17,570	3–11–4	10	W
19	November 17	Colorado	5 – 3	Calgary		Kidd	17,928	3–12–4	10	L
20	November 18	Calgary	2 – 5	Colorado		Tabaracci	16,061	3–13–4	10	L
21	November 21	Anaheim	3 – 2	Calgary		Kidd	17,584	3–14–4	10	L
22	November 24	Edmonton	5 – 2	Calgary		Kidd	18,436	3–15–4	10	L
23	November 26	Chicago	2 – 2	Calgary		Tabaracci	17,364	3–15–5	11	T
24	November 29	Calgary	5 – 3	San Jose		Tabaracci	17,190	4–15–5	13	W

December: 7–6–2 (home: 3–3–1; road: 4–3–1)

Game	Date	Visitor	Score	Home	OT	Decision	Attendance	Record	Pts	Recap
25	December 1	Calgary	8 – 2	Edmonton		Tabaracci	14,189	5–15–5	15	W
26	December 3	Calgary	2 – 5	Winnipeg		Tabaracci	8,721	5–16–5	15	L
27	December 5	St. Louis	1 – 1	Calgary	OT	Kidd	16,284	5–16–6	16	T
28	December 9	Vancouver	4 – 3	Calgary		Kidd	17,147	5–17–6	16	L
29	December 11	Los Angeles	2 – 6	Calgary		Tabaracci	17,349	6–17–6	18	W
30	December 13	Calgary	8 – 4	Dallas		Tabaracci	15,184	7–17–6	20	W
31	December 14	Calgary	3 – 3	St. Louis	OT	Tabaracci	17,197	7–17–7	21	T
32	December 16	Calgary	3 – 6	Boston		Kidd	17,392	7–18–7	21	L
33	December 19	Calgary	1 – 7	Pittsburgh		Kidd	7,170	7–19–7	21	L
34	December 20	Calgary	3 – 2	Hartford		Tabaracci	6,563	8–19–7	23	W
35	December 22	Detroit	5 – 1	Calgary		Tabaracci	17,302	8–20–7	23	L
36	December 26	Calgary	4 – 2	Vancouver		Kidd	18,422	9–20–7	25	W
37	December 27	Toronto	0 – 4	Calgary		Kidd	19,810	10–20–7	27	W
38	December 29	Philadelphia	3 – 2	Calgary		Kidd	19,989	10–21–7	27	L
39	December 31	NY Rangers	1 – 3	Calgary		Kidd	19,284	11–21–7	29	W

January: 7–2–2 (home: 6–2–0; road: 1–0–2)

Game	Date	Visitor	Score	Home	OT	Decision	Attendance	Record	Pts	Recap
40	January 2	Tampa Bay	0 – 10	Calgary		Kidd	16,893	12–21–7	31	W
41	January 5	Anaheim	3 – 1	Calgary		Kidd	16,821	12–22–7	31	L
42	January 6	Florida	0 – 2	Calgary		Tabaracci	16,792	13–22–7	33	W
43	January 10	Hartford	2 – 3	Calgary	OT	Tabaracci	16,469	14–22–7	35	W
44	January 12	Buffalo	1 – 3	Calgary		Tabaracci	17,432	15–22–7	37	W
45	January 14	Calgary	4 – 4	Colorado	OT	Kidd	16,061	15–22–8	38	T
46	January 16	Calgary	5 – 5	Los Angeles	OT	Tabaracci	12,235	15–22–9	39	T
47	January 17	Calgary	4 – 1	Anaheim		Kidd	17,174	16–22–9	41	W
48	January 24	NY Islanders	1 – 4	Calgary		Kidd	17,348	17–22–9	43	W
49	January 26	Dallas	4 – 2	Calgary		Tabaracci	18,292	17–23–9	43	L
50	January 30	Edmonton	2 – 3	Calgary	OT	Kidd	17,724	18–23–9	45	W

February: 6–5–2 (home: 5–2–2; road: 1–3–0)

Game	Date	Visitor	Score	Home	OT	Decision	Attendance	Record	Pts	Recap
51	February 1	New Jersey	1 – 1	Calgary	OT	Kidd	16,862	18–23–10	46	T
52	February 3	Los Angeles	1 – 2	Calgary		Kidd	18,923	19–23–10	48	W
53	February 6	Ottawa	1 – 3	Calgary		Kidd	16,442	20–23–10	50	W
54	February 8	Washington	4 – 4	Calgary	OT	Kidd	16,516	20–23–11	51	T
55	February 10	Winnipeg	3 – 2	Calgary		Kidd	N/A	20–24–11	51	L
56	February 11	Calgary	2 – 4	Edmonton		Tabaracci	N/A	20–25–11	51	L
57	February 13	Calgary	2 – 3	Washington		Kidd	9,272	20–26–11	51	L
58	February 15	Calgary	6 – 3	NY Islanders		Tabaracci	7,792	21–26–11	53	W
59	February 17	Calgary	1 – 5	Montreal		Kidd	17,959	21–27–11	53	L
60	February 20	San Jose	3 – 5	Calgary		Tabaracci	16,465	22–27–11	55	W
61	February 23	Anaheim	2 – 3	Calgary		Tabaracci	17,516	23–27–11	57	W
62	February 24	Boston	2 – 1	Calgary		Tabaracci	19,989	23–28–11	57	L
63	February 29	Pittsburgh	3 – 7	Calgary		Tabaracci	19,989	24–28–11	59	W

March: 7–6–0 (home: 2–4–0; road: 5–2–0)

Game	Date	Visitor	Score	Home	OT	Decision	Attendance	Record	Pts	Recap
64	March 3	Calgary	5 – 1	San Jose		Tabaracci	N/A	25–28–11	61	W
65	March 7	Calgary	4 – 2	St. Louis		Tabaracci	20,590	26–28–11	63	W
66	March 9	Calgary	3 – 4	Toronto		Tabaracci	15,706	26–29–11	63	L
67	March 12	St. Louis	2 – 4	Calgary		Kidd	19,989	27–29–11	65	W
68	March 15	Calgary	3 – 1	Buffalo		Tabaracci	15,587	28–29–11	67	W
69	March 17	Calgary	2 – 4	Detroit		Tabaracci	19,983	28–30–11	67	L
70	March 20	Calgary	3 – 2	Chicago		Kidd	20,367	29–30–11	69	W
71	March 22	San Jose	2 – 1	Calgary	OT	Tabaracci	18,267	29–31–11	69	L
72	March 23	Calgary	4 – 0	Vancouver		Kidd	18,422	30–31–11	71	W
73	March 25	Toronto	4 – 2	Calgary		Kidd	19,989	30–32–11	71	L
74	March 27	Chicago	0 – 1	Calgary		Tabaracci	16,668	31–32–11	73	W
75	March 29	Los Angeles	4 – 3	Calgary		Tabaracci	18,280	31–33–11	73	L
76	March 31	Winnipeg	4 – 1	Calgary		Kidd	18,155	31–34–11	73	L

April: 3–3–0 (home: 1–1–0; road: 2–2–0)

Game	Date	Visitor	Score	Home	OT	Decision	Attendance	Record	Pts	Recap
77	April 3	Vancouver	3 – 4	Calgary		Tabaracci	18,300	32–34–11	75	W
78	April 6	Calgary	3 – 4	Winnipeg		Tabaracci	15,557	32–35–11	75	L
79	April 8	Calgary	3 – 2	Edmonton		Kidd	15,869	33–35–11	77	W
80	April 9	Dallas	4 – 3	Calgary	OT	Kidd	17,756	33–36–11	77	L
81	April 12	Calgary	6 – 0	San Jose		Tabaracci	17,190	34–36–11	79	W
82	April 13	Calgary	0 – 5	Vancouver		Tabaracci	18,422	34–37–11	79	L

Legend: W Win (2 points) L Loss (0 points) T Tie (1 point)

=== Playoffs ===
1996 Stanley Cup playoffs
Western Conference Quarterfinals vs. Chicago Blackhawks (3) – Chicago wins 4–0

Game	Date	Visitor	Score	Home	OT	Decision	Attendance	Series	Recap
1	April 17	Calgary	1 – 4	Chicago		Kidd	17,455	Chicago leads 1–0	L
2	April 19	Calgary	0 – 3	Chicago		Tabaracci	19,972	Chicago leads 2–0	L
3	April 21	Chicago	7 – 5	Calgary		Tabaracci	15,229	Chicago leads 3–0	L
4	April 23	Chicago	2 – 1	Calgary	3OT	Tabaracci	16,629	Chicago wins 4–0	L

Legend: W Win L Loss

== Player statistics ==
=== Scoring ===
- Position abbreviations: C = Centre; D = Defence; G = Goaltender; LW = Left wing; RW = Right wing
- † = Joined team via a transaction (e.g., trade, waivers, signing) during the season. Stats reflect time with the Flames only.
- ‡ = Left team via a transaction (e.g., trade, waivers, release) during the season. Stats reflect time with the Flames only.

No.	Player	Pos	Regular season						Playoffs					
No.	Player	Pos	GP	G	A	Pts	+/-	PIM	GP	G	A	Pts	+/-	PIM
14	Theoren Fleury	RW	80	46	50	96	17	112	4	2	1	3	1	14
13	German Titov	LW	82	28	39	67	9	24	4	0	2	2	0	0
92	Michael Nylander	C	73	17	38	55	0	20	4	0	0	0	−4	0
6	Phil Housley‡	D	59	16	36	52	−2	22	—	—	—	—	—	—
10	Gary Roberts	LW	35	22	20	42	15	78	—	—	—	—	—	—
16	Cory Stillman	LW	74	16	19	35	−5	41	2	1	1	2	−2	0
3	James Patrick	D	80	3	32	35	3	30	4	0	0	0	−3	2
21	Steve Chiasson	D	76	8	25	33	3	62	4	2	1	3	0	0
33	Zarley Zalapski	D	80	12	17	29	11	115	4	0	1	1	1	10
32	Mike Sullivan	LW	81	9	12	21	−6	24	4	0	0	0	−1	0
15	Sandy McCarthy	RW	75	9	7	16	−8	173	4	0	0	0	−3	10
18 (Note: Torgayev wore number 35 in his first three games.)	Pavel Torgayev	LW	41	6	10	16	2	14	1	0	0	0	0	0
22	Ronnie Stern	RW	52	10	5	15	2	111	4	0	2	2	2	8
12	Paul Kruse	LW	75	3	12	15	−5	145	3	0	0	0	−1	4
20	Dean Evason	C	67	7	7	14	−6	38	3	0	1	1	−1	0
34	Corey Millen†	C	31	4	10	14	8	10	—	—	—	—	—	—
7	Jamie Huscroft	D	70	3	9	12	14	162	4	0	1	1	−2	4
23	Sheldon Kennedy	RW	41	3	7	10	3	36	3	1	0	1	−2	2
47	Claude Lapointe†	C	32	4	5	9	2	20	2	0	0	0	−2	0
45	Jocelyn Lemieux†	RW	20	4	4	8	−1	10	4	0	0	0	0	0
42	Ed Ward	RW	41	3	5	8	−2	44	—	—	—	—	—	—
28 (Note: Murray wore number 45 in his first seven games.)	Marty Murray	C	15	3	3	6	−4	0	—	—	—	—	—	—
36	Yves Sarault†	LW	11	2	1	3	−2	4	—	—	—	—	—	—
8	Trent Yawney	D	69	0	3	3	−1	88	4	0	0	0	−3	2
4	Kevin Dahl	D	32	1	1	2	−2	26	1	0	0	0	0	0
17	Bob Sweeney†	C	6	1	1	2	3	6	2	0	0	0	−1	0
37	Trevor Kidd	G	47	0	2	2		4	2	0	0	0		0
31	Rick Tabaracci	G	43	0	2	2		8	3	0	0	0		4
46	Ladislav Kohn	RW	5	1	0	1	−1	2	—	—	—	—	—	—
5	Tommy Albelin†	D	20	0	1	1	1	4	4	0	0	0	−2	0
5 (Note: Bouchard wore number 34 in his first game.)	Joel Bouchard	D	4	0	0	0	0	4	—	—	—	—	—	—
11	Pat Conacher†‡	C	7	0	0	0	−1	0	—	—	—	—	—	—
38	Craig Ferguson†‡	C	8	0	0	0	−4	4	—	—	—	—	—	—
17	Todd Hlushko	C	4	0	0	0	0	6	—	—	—	—	—	—
29	Cale Hulse†	D	3	0	0	0	3	5	1	0	0	0	−2	0
39	Dan Keczmer‡	D	13	0	0	0	−6	14	—	—	—	—	—	—
27 (Note: Simpson wore number 40 in his first four games.)	Todd Simpson	D	6	0	0	0	0	32	—	—	—	—	—	—
38	Jarrod Skalde†	C	1	0	0	0	0	0	—	—	—	—	—	—
35	Niklas Sundblad	RW	2	0	0	0	0	0	—	—	—	—	—	—
19	Vesa Viitakoski‡	LW	5	0	0	0	−1	2	—	—	—	—	—	—
24	Jarome Iginla†	C	—	—	—	—	—	—	2	1	1	2	2	0

=== Goaltending ===
No.	Player	Regular season										Playoffs								
No.	Player	GP	W	L	T	SA	GA	GAA	SV%	SO	TOI	GP	W	L	SA	GA	GAA	SV%	SO	TOI
31	Rick Tabaracci	43	19	16	3	1087	117	2.94	.892	3	2391	3	0	3	84	7	2.06	.917	0	204
37	Trevor Kidd	47	15	21	9	1130	119	2.78	.895	3	2570	2	0	1	40	9	6.48	.775	0	83

== Awards and records ==
=== Awards ===
Type	Award/honour	Recipient	Ref
League (annual)	Bill Masterton Memorial Trophy	Gary Roberts	
League (in-season)	NHL All-Star Game selection	Theoren Fleury	
Team	Molson Cup	Theoren Fleury	
Team	Ralph T. Scurfield Humanitarian Award	Gary Roberts	

=== Milestones ===
Milestone	Player	Date	Ref
First game	Marty Murray	October 7, 1995	
First game	Todd Simpson	October 7, 1995	
First game	Ladislav Kohn	October 25, 1995	
First game	Pavel Torgayev	October 25, 1995	
First game	Niklas Sundblad	November 26, 1995	
First game	Jarome Iginla	April 21, 1996	

== Transactions ==
The Flames were involved in the following transactions during the 1995–96 season.

=== Trades ===
November 1, 1995	To Calgary Flames Claude Lapointe	To Colorado Avalanche 7th-round pick in 1997
November 26, 1995	To Calgary Flames Yves Sarault; Craig Ferguson	To Montreal Canadiens 8th-round pick in 1997
December 19, 1995	To Calgary Flames Jarome Iginla; Corey Millen	To Dallas Stars Joe Nieuwendyk
February 26, 1996	To Calgary Flames Tommy Albelin; Cale Hulse; Jocelyn Lemieux	To New Jersey Devils Phil Housley; Dan Keczmer
March 20, 1996	To Calgary Flames Bob Sweeney	To New York Islanders Pat Conacher; 6th-round pick in 1997

=== Free agents ===
Player / Former team	Player / New team

== Draft picks ==
Calgary's picks at the 1995 NHL entry draft, held in Edmonton, Alberta.

Rnd	Pick	Player	Nationality	Position	Team (league)	NHL statistics				
Rnd	Pick	Player	Nationality	Position	Team (league)	GP	G	A	Pts	PIM
1	20	Denis Gauthier	Canada	D	Drummondville Voltigeurs (QMJHL)	554	17	60	77	748
2	46	Pavel Smirnov	Russia	F	Samara CSK VVS (RSL)					
3	72	Rocky Thompson	Canada	RW	Medicine Hat Tigers (WHL)	25	0	0	0	117
4	98	Jan Labraaten	Sweden	RW	Färjestads BK (SEL)					
6	150	Clarke Wilm	Canada	C	Saskatoon Blades (WHL)	455	37	60	97	336
7	176	Ryan Gillis	Canada	D	North Bay Centennials (OHL)					
9	233	Steve Shirreffs	United States	D	N/A					

== Farm teams ==
=== Saint John Flames ===
The Baby Flames finished the 1995–96 American Hockey League season in second place in the Canadian Division with a 35–30–11–4 record. The tied the Prince Edward Island Senators in points, but lost out on the division title by virtue of having three fewer wins. The Flames defeated the St. John's Maple Leafs three games to one, then knocked off the Fredericton Canadiens four games to one before falling to the Portland Pirates in seven games. Ladislav Kohn led the Flames with 28 goals and 73 points. Dwayne Roloson was the starting goaltender, posting a 33–22–11 record with a 2.83 GAA in 67 games.

== See also ==
- 1995–96 NHL season
