= Anatoli Semenov =

- Born: 5 March 1962 (age 64) Moscow, Soviet Union
- Height: 6 ft 2 in (188 cm)
- Weight: 190 lb (86 kg; 13 st 8 lb)
- Position: Centre
- Shot: Left
- Played for: Edmonton Oilers; Tampa Bay Lightning; Vancouver Canucks; Mighty Ducks of Anaheim; Philadelphia Flyers; Buffalo Sabres; HC Dynamo Moscow (Russia)
- National team: Soviet Union and Russia
- NHL draft: 120th overall, 1989; Edmonton Oilers
- Playing career: 1979–1997

Anatoli Anatolievich Semyonov (Анатолий Анатольевич Семёнов; born 5 March 1962) is a Russian former professional ice hockey centre who was a star in the Soviet Union during the 1980s and later spent parts of 8 seasons in the National Hockey League (NHL).

== Playing career ==
=== Soviet Union ===
Semenov broke into the Russian Hockey League in 1979 with Moscow Dynamo and would spend 11 seasons with the club. He was the team's top player for most of the 1980s (succeeding the great Alexander Maltsev, who retired in 1984), as he led them in scoring on three occasions and was named a Russian All-Star in 1985. However, team success would elude him as Moscow Dynamo would traditionally finish runners-up to the powerhouse CSKA Moscow team which was stacked with most of the Soviet Union's top players.

Throughout the 1980s, he also gained attention outside of Russia for his strong performances in international play, often anchoring a secondary scoring unit behind the famed KLM Line. He was particularly strong in the 1984 and 1987 Canada Cup tournaments, finishing 7th in tournament scoring in 1987 against primarily National Hockey League players. He would also help the Soviet Union to a Gold Medal at the 1988 Winter Olympics.

With the impending fall of the Iron Curtain now beginning to allow players to leave Russia, Semenov was drafted in the sixth round, 120th overall, by the Edmonton Oilers in the 1989 NHL entry draft. His last season in Russia would be one of his most successful, as he finally led Moscow Dynamo to the league championship in 1990, their first title since 1954.

=== National Hockey League ===
Following the close of the Soviet season, Semenov joined the Oilers for the 1990 NHL playoffs. He appeared in 2 games as the Oilers marched to their 5th Stanley Cup Championship in 7 years, becoming the second Russian to play for a Cup winner. However, he isn't considered an 'official' member of the Cup-winning team as he failed to meet games-played requirements, and his name is not engraved on the Stanley Cup.

Semenov would endure a hit-and-miss transition to the NHL with the Oilers, producing fairly well when in the lineup but never really establishing himself as a key player. In 1990–91, his 'rookie' season (at age 28), he recorded 15 goals and 16 assists for 31 points in 57 games, and followed it up with a strong playoffs, recording 5 goals and 10 points in 12 games. In 1991–92, he recorded his only 20-goal season in the NHL and added 22 assists for 42 points in 59 games.

Exposed in the 1992 NHL Expansion Draft, Semenov was selected by the Tampa Bay Lightning, and was a member of that team at the outset of their inaugural season. However, he appeared in only 13 games for the Lightning before being dealt to the Vancouver Canucks, who were looking for a Russian center to play with young superstar winger Pavel Bure following the departure of Igor Larionov. Semenov and Bure clicked well early on, setting a torrid scoring pace through the first half of the season, but Semenov faltered after the All-Star break. He was eventually moved off the top line, although he finished with career highs of 37 assists and 49 points.

He would again be exposed in the 1993 NHL Expansion Draft, and was selected this time by the Mighty Ducks of Anaheim. He performed well in 1993–94, recording 11 goals and 30 points in 49 games, and would likely have challenged for the team scoring lead if not for a long absence due to injury.

Dealt to the Philadelphia Flyers in 1995, Semenov would play out his final few NHL seasons primarily as a utility player. He finished the lockout-shortened 1994–95 season with just 4 goals and 10 points in 41 games between Anaheim and Philadelphia, although he added a solid playoff performance with 6 points as the Flyers reached the third round. The Flyers dealt him back to Anaheim midway through the following season, and he closed out his career with a brief stint for the Buffalo Sabres, appearing in 25 games for them in 1996–97 before retiring.

In his NHL career, he appeared in 362 games, scoring 68 goals and adding 126 assists for 194 points. He also appeared in 49 playoff games, scoring 9 goals and recording 13 assists for 22 points.

== Career statistics ==
=== Regular season and playoffs ===
| | | | Regular season | | | | | Playoffs |
| Season | Team | League | GP | G | A | Pts | PIM | GP | G | A | Pts | PIM |
|---|---|---|---|---|---|---|---|---|---|---|---|---|
| 1979–80 | Dynamo Moskva | Soviet | 7 | 3 | 0 | 3 | 2 | — | — | — | — | — |
| 1980–81 | Dynamo Moskva | Soviet | 47 | 18 | 14 | 32 | 18 | — | — | — | — | — |
| 1981–82 | Dynamo Moskva | Soviet | 44 | 12 | 14 | 26 | 28 | — | — | — | — | — |
| 1982–83 | Dynamo Moskva | Soviet | 44 | 22 | 18 | 40 | 26 | — | — | — | — | — |
| 1983–84 | Dynamo Moskva | Soviet | 19 | 10 | 5 | 15 | 14 | — | — | — | — | — |
| 1984–85 | Dynamo Moskva | Soviet | 30 | 17 | 12 | 29 | 32 | — | — | — | — | — |
| 1985–86 | Dynamo Moskva | Soviet | 32 | 18 | 17 | 35 | 19 | — | — | — | — | — |
| 1986–87 | Dynamo Moskva | Soviet | 40 | 15 | 29 | 44 | 32 | — | — | — | — | — |
| 1987–88 | Dynamo Moskva | Soviet | 32 | 17 | 8 | 25 | 22 | — | — | — | — | — |
| 1988–89 | Dynamo Moskva | Soviet | 31 | 9 | 12 | 21 | 24 | — | — | — | — | — |
| 1989–90 | Dynamo Moskva | Soviet | 48 | 13 | 20 | 33 | 16 | — | — | — | — | — |
| 1989–90 | Edmonton Oilers | NHL | — | — | — | — | — | 2 | 0 | 0 | 0 | 0 |
| 1990–91 | Edmonton Oilers | NHL | 57 | 15 | 16 | 31 | 26 | 12 | 5 | 5 | 10 | 6 |
| 1991–92 | Edmonton Oilers | NHL | 59 | 20 | 22 | 42 | 16 | 8 | 1 | 1 | 2 | 6 |
| 1992–93 | Tampa Bay Lightning | NHL | 13 | 2 | 3 | 5 | 4 | — | — | — | — | — |
| 1992–93 | Vancouver Canucks | NHL | 62 | 10 | 34 | 44 | 28 | 12 | 1 | 3 | 4 | 0 |
| 1993–94 | Mighty Ducks of Anaheim | NHL | 49 | 11 | 19 | 30 | 12 | — | — | — | — | — |
| 1994–95 | Mighty Ducks of Anaheim | NHL | 15 | 3 | 4 | 7 | 4 | — | — | — | — | — |
| 1994–95 | Philadelphia Flyers | NHL | 26 | 1 | 2 | 3 | 6 | 15 | 2 | 4 | 6 | 0 |
| 1995–96 | Philadelphia Flyers | NHL | 44 | 3 | 13 | 16 | 14 | — | — | — | — | — |
| 1995–96 | Mighty Ducks of Anaheim | NHL | 12 | 1 | 9 | 10 | 10 | — | — | — | — | — |
| 1996–97 | Buffalo Sabres | NHL | 25 | 2 | 4 | 6 | 2 | — | — | — | — | — |
| 1997–98 | Dinamo-Energija Yekaterinburg | RSL | 8 | 0 | 0 | 0 | 0 | — | — | — | — | — |
| USSR totals | | | 374 | 154 | 149 | 303 | 233 | — | — | — | — | — |
| NHL totals | | | 362 | 68 | 126 | 194 | 122 | 49 | 9 | 13 | 22 | 12 |

=== International ===
| Year | Team | Event | GP | G | A | Pts | PIM |
|---|---|---|---|---|---|---|---|
| 1980 | Soviet Union | EJC | 5 | 1 | 3 | 4 | 6 |
| 1981 | Soviet Union | WJC | 5 | 3 | 2 | 5 | 6 |
| 1982 | Soviet Union | WJC | 7 | 5 | 8 | 13 | 22 |
| 1984 | Soviet Union | CC | 6 | 3 | 1 | 4 | 0 |
| 1987 | Soviet Union | WC | 10 | 2 | 1 | 3 | 16 |
| 1987 | Soviet Union | CC | 9 | 2 | 5 | 7 | 2 |
| 1988 | Soviet Union | OG | 8 | 2 | 4 | 6 | 6 |
| Junior totals | | | 17 | 9 | 13 | 22 | 34 |
| Senior totals | | | 33 | 9 | 11 | 20 | 24 |
