= 1994–95 Winnipeg Jets season =

NHL hockey team season

1994–95 Winnipeg Jets
- Division: 6th Central
- Conference: 10th Western
- 1994–95 record: 16–25–7
- Home record: 10–10–4
- Road record: 6–15–3
- Goals for: 157
- Goals against: 177

Team information
- General manager: John Paddock
- Coach: John Paddock (Oct.–Apr.); Terry Simpson (interim: Apr.–May)
- Captain: Keith Tkachuk
- Arena: Winnipeg Arena
- Average attendance: 13,012
- Minor league affiliate: Springfield Falcons

Team leaders
- Goals: Alexei Zhamnov (30)
- Assists: Alexei Zhamnov (35)
- Points: Alexei Zhamnov (65)
- Penalty minutes: Keith Tkachuk (152)
- Plus/minus: Teppo Numminen (+12)
- Wins: Tim Cheveldae, Nikolai Khabibulin (8)
- Goals against average: Nikolai Khabibulin (3.41)

The 1994–95 Winnipeg Jets season was the team's 23rd season in Winnipeg and their 16th season in the National Hockey League (NHL). Despite missing the playoffs for the second year in a row, the Jets featured the second-best forward line in the NHL that season, as Keith Tkachuk, Teemu Selanne and Alexei Zhamnov scored a collective 74 goals in 48 games. This total was second only to the Philadelphia Flyers' top-line total of 80 (scored collectively by the "Legion of Doom").

== Regular season ==
Two major highlights of the regular season occurred in April. On April 1, 1995, Alexei Zhamnov tied a franchise record by scoring five goals in the Jets' 7–7 tie with Los Angeles Kings. Six days later, the Jets established an NHL record by scoring four short-handed goals in a 7–4 win against the Vancouver Canucks.

General manager John Paddock resigned as head coach on April 5. Assistant coach Terry Simpson was named interim head coach.

=== Season standings ===
Central Division
No.	CR		GP	W	L	T	GF	GA	Pts
1	1	**Detroit Red Wings**	48	33	11	4	180	117	70
2	2	**St. Louis Blues**	48	28	15	5	178	135	61
3	4	**Chicago Blackhawks**	48	24	19	5	156	115	53
4	5	**Toronto Maple Leafs**	48	21	19	8	135	146	50
5	8	**Dallas Stars**	48	17	23	8	136	135	42
6	10	Winnipeg Jets	48	16	25	7	157	177	39

Note: No. = Division rank, CR = Conference rank, W = Wins, L = Losses, T = Ties, GF = Goals For, GA = Goals Against, Pts = Points
Teams that qualified for the playoffs are highlighted in bold.

Western Conference
R		Div	GP	W	L	T	GF	GA	Pts
**1**	**p – Detroit Red Wings**	**CEN**	**48**	**33**	**11**	**4**	**180**	**117**	**70**
**2**	**x – Calgary Flames**	**PAC**	**48**	**24**	**17**	**7**	**163**	**135**	**55**
**3**	**St. Louis Blues**	**CEN**	**48**	**28**	**15**	**5**	**178**	**135**	**61**
**4**	**Chicago Blackhawks**	**CEN**	**48**	**24**	**19**	**5**	**156**	**115**	**53**
**5**	**Toronto Maple Leafs**	**CEN**	**48**	**21**	**19**	**8**	**135**	**146**	**50**
**6**	**Vancouver Canucks**	**PAC**	**48**	**18**	**18**	**12**	**153**	**148**	**48**
**7**	**San Jose Sharks**	**PAC**	**48**	**19**	**25**	**4**	**129**	**161**	**42**
**8**	**Dallas Stars**	**CEN**	**48**	**17**	**23**	**8**	**136**	**135**	**42**
9	Los Angeles Kings	PAC	48	16	23	9	142	174	41
10	Winnipeg Jets	CEN	48	16	25	7	157	177	39
11	Edmonton Oilers	PAC	48	17	27	4	136	183	38
12	Mighty Ducks of Anaheim	PAC	48	16	27	5	125	164	37

Divisions: CEN – Central, PAC – Pacific

bold – Qualified for playoffs; x – Won division; p – Won Presidents' Trophy

== Schedule and results ==
1994–95 regular season
January: 1–4–1 (home: 1–1–1; road: 0–3–0)

Game	Date	Score	Opponent	Record	Attendance	Recap
1	January 20, 1995	3–3 OT	Calgary Flames (1994–95)	0–0–1	13,382	T
2	January 21, 1995	3–4	Mighty Ducks of Anaheim (1994–95)	0–1–1	9,725	L
3	January 23, 1995	5–3	Chicago Blackhawks (1994–95)	1–1–1	8,794	W
4	January 25, 1995	0–4	@ San Jose Sharks (1994–95)	1–2–1	17,190	L
5	January 27, 1995	2–3	@ Mighty Ducks of Anaheim (1994–95)	1–3–1	17,174	L
6	January 28, 1995	2–4	@ Los Angeles Kings (1994–95)	1–4–1	15,115	L

February: 5–6–2 (home: 1–4–1; road: 4–2–1)

Game	Date	Score	Opponent	Record	Attendance	Recap
7	February 2, 1995	4–5 OT	St. Louis Blues (1994–95)	1–5–1	13,611	L
8	February 4, 1995	3–3 OT	San Jose Sharks (1994–95)	1–5–2	13,525	T
9	February 6, 1995	5–4	@ Calgary Flames (1994–95)	2–5–2	17,706	W
10	February 8, 1995	3–3 OT	@ Edmonton Oilers (1994–95)	2–5–3	10,308	T
11	February 9, 1995	1–5	@ Vancouver Canucks (1994–95)	2–6–3	10,630	L
12	February 11, 1995	3–2	@ St. Louis Blues (1994–95)	3–6–3	20,262	W
13	February 13, 1995	7–4	@ Dallas Stars (1994–95)	4–6–3	15,379	W
14	February 15, 1995	1–5	Detroit Red Wings (1994–95)	4–7–3	12,299	L
15	February 17, 1995	3–4	St. Louis Blues (1994–95)	4–8–3	12,770	L
16	February 22, 1995	4–1	@ Vancouver Canucks (1994–95)	5–8–3	16,072	W
17	February 24, 1995	4–2	Mighty Ducks of Anaheim (1994–95)	6–8–3	12,843	W
18	February 25, 1995	2–5	@ Toronto Maple Leafs (1994–95)	6–9–3	15,746	L
19	February 28, 1995	0–4	Dallas Stars (1994–95)	6–10–3	10,573	L

March: 3–8–2 (home: 3–2–2; road: 0–6–0)

Game	Date	Score	Opponent	Record	Attendance	Recap
20	March 2, 1995	1–6	@ Detroit Red Wings (1994–95)	6–11–3	19,875	L
21	March 4, 1995	4–2	San Jose Sharks (1994–95)	7–11–3	11,217	W
22	March 5, 1995	3–2	Calgary Flames (1994–95)	8–11–3	11,197	W
23	March 10, 1995	4–3	Dallas Stars (1994–95)	9–11–3	11,603	W
24	March 11, 1995	2–4	Los Angeles Kings (1994–95)	9–12–3	15,255	L
25	March 14, 1995	3–3 OT	Vancouver Canucks (1994–95)	9–12–4	15,556	T
26	March 17, 1995	4–8	@ Calgary Flames (1994–95)	9–13–4	18,781	L
27	March 19, 1995	2–3	Chicago Blackhawks (1994–95)	9–14–4	12,005	L
28	March 22, 1995	3–6	@ Detroit Red Wings (1994–95)	9–15–4	19,807	L
29	March 24, 1995	2–3	@ Toronto Maple Leafs (1994–95)	9–16–4	15,746	L
30	March 25, 1995	3–3 OT	Toronto Maple Leafs (1994–95)	9–16–5	15,397	T
31	March 28, 1995	5–6 OT	@ San Jose Sharks (1994–95)	9–17–5	17,190	L
32	March 30, 1995	1–3	@ Mighty Ducks of Anaheim (1994–95)	9–18–5	17,174	L

April: 7–5–2 (home: 5–2–0; road: 2–3–2)

Game	Date	Score	Opponent	Record	Attendance	Recap
33	April 1, 1995	7–7 OT	@ Los Angeles Kings (1994–95)	9–18–6	16,005	T
34	April 5, 1995	4–1	Chicago Blackhawks (1994–95)	10–18–6	11,334	W
35	April 7, 1995	7–4	Vancouver Canucks (1994–95)	11–18–6	15,565	W
36	April 8, 1995	3–4	@ Toronto Maple Leafs (1994–95)	11–19–6	15,746	L
37	April 11, 1995	5–7	@ St. Louis Blues (1994–95)	11–20–6	18,969	L
38	April 13, 1995	5–2	St. Louis Blues (1994–95)	12–20–6	13,250	W
39	April 15, 1995	5–1	Toronto Maple Leafs (1994–95)	13–20–6	15,261	W
40	April 17, 1995	5–6	Edmonton Oilers (1994–95)	13–21–6	14,501	L
41	April 19, 1995	5–5 OT	@ Detroit Red Wings (1994–95)	13–21–7	19,875	T
42	April 21, 1995	2–1	@ Chicago Blackhawks (1994–95)	14–21–7	21,213	W
43	April 23, 1995	2–5	@ Dallas Stars (1994–95)	14–22–7	16,924	L
44	April 25, 1995	3–5	Edmonton Oilers (1994–95)	14–23–7	12,994	L
45	April 27, 1995	4–3	Detroit Red Wings (1994–95)	15–23–7	14,081	W
46	April 29, 1995	5–1	@ Edmonton Oilers (1994–95)	16–23–7	15,219	W

May: 0–2–0 (home: 0–1–0; road: 0–1–0)

Game	Date	Score	Opponent	Record	Attendance	Recap
47	May 1, 1995	2–3	@ Chicago Blackhawks (1994–95)	16–24–7	19,403	L
48	May 2, 1995	1–2	Los Angeles Kings (1994–95)	16–25–7	15,562	L

Legend: W Win (2 points) L Loss (0 points) T Tie (1 point)

== Player statistics ==
=== Scoring ===
- Position abbreviations: C = Centre; D = Defence; G = Goaltender; LW = Left wing; RW = Right wing
- † = Joined team via a transaction (e.g., trade, waivers, signing) during the season. Stats reflect time with the Jets only.
- ‡ = Left team via a transaction (e.g., trade, waivers, release) during the season. Stats reflect time with the Jets only.

No.	Player	Pos	Regular season					
No.	Player	Pos	GP	G	A	Pts	+/-	PIM
10	Alexei Zhamnov	C	48	30	35	65	5	20
7	Keith Tkachuk	LW	48	22	29	51	−4	152
8	Teemu Selanne	RW	45	22	26	48	1	2
19	Nelson Emerson	RW	48	14	23	37	−12	26
23	Igor Korolev	C	45	8	22	30	1	10
18	Dallas Drake	RW	43	8	18	26	−6	30
4	Stephane Quintal	D	43	6	17	23	0	78
27	Teppo Numminen	D	42	5	16	21	12	16
3	Dave Manson	D	44	3	15	18	−20	139
25	Thomas Steen	C	31	5	10	15	−13	14
24	Darryl Shannon	D	40	5	9	14	1	48
15	Randy Gilhen	C	44	5	6	11	−17	52
16	Ed Olczyk†	C	13	2	8	10	1	8
32	Mike Eastwood†	C	13	3	6	9	3	4
34	Darrin Shannon	LW	19	5	3	8	−6	14
20	Tie Domi‡	RW	31	4	4	8	−6	128
17	Kris King	LW	48	4	2	6	0	85
2	Neil Wilkinson	D	40	1	4	5	−26	75
75	Michal Grosek	LW	24	2	2	4	−3	21
5	Igor Ulanov‡	D	19	1	3	4	−2	27
36	Mike Eagles‡	C	27	2	1	3	−13	40
36	Greg Brown†	D	9	0	3	3	1	17
42	Oleg Mikulchik	D	25	0	2	2	10	12
12	Rob Murray	C	10	0	2	2	1	2
29	Tim Cheveldae	G	30	0	1	1		2
35	Nikolai Khabibulin	G	26	0	1	1		4
28	Craig Martin	RW	20	0	1	1	−4	19
55	Arto Blomsten‡	D	1	0	0	0	0	2
38	Luciano Borsato	C	4	0	0	0	−1	0
47	Tavis Hansen	RW	1	0	0	0	0	0
37	John LeBlanc	RW	2	0	0	0	0	0
21	Russ Romaniuk	LW	6	0	0	0	−3	0
22	Brent Thompson	D	29	0	0	0	−17	78

=== Goaltending ===
No.	Player	Regular season									
No.	Player	GP	W	L	T	SA	GA	GAA	SV%	SO	TOI
29	Tim Cheveldae	30	8	16	3	818	97	3.70	.881	0	1571
35	Nikolai Khabibulin	26	8	9	4	723	76	3.41	.895	0	1339

== Awards and records ==
=== Awards ===
Type	Award/honour	Recipient	Ref
League (annual)	NHL Second All-Star team	Keith Tkachuk (Left Wing)	
League (annual)	NHL Second All-Star team	Alexei Zhamnov (Centre)	
Team	Molson Cup	Alexei Zhamnov	

=== Milestones ===
Milestone	Player	Date	Ref
First game	Nikolai Khabibulin	January 21, 1995	
First game	Craig Martin	February 24, 1995	
First game	Tavis Hansen	April 7, 1995	

== Transactions ==
=== Trades ===
July 8, 1994	To Buffalo Sabres Kevin McClelland	To Winnipeg Jets Future Considerations
August 8, 1994	To Los Angeles Kings Ruslan Batyrshin; 6th round pick in 1995 (Brian Willsie); 2nd round pick in 1996 (Marian Cisar)	To Winnipeg Jets Brent Thompson; 6th round pick in 1995 (Robert Esche); Cash
March 27, 1995	To Los Angeles Kings Arto Blomsten	To Winnipeg Jets 8th round pick in 1995 (Fredrik Loven)
April 7, 1995	To Washington Capitals Mike Eagles; Igor Ulanov	To Winnipeg Jets 3rd round pick in 1995 (Sergei Gusev); 5th round pick in 1995 (Brian Elder)
April 7, 1995	To New York Rangers 5th round pick in 1995 (Alexei Vasiliev)	To Winnipeg Jets Ed Olczyk
April 7, 1995	To Pittsburgh Penguins Cash	To Winnipeg Jets Greg Brown
April 7, 1995	To Toronto Maple Leafs Tie Domi	To Winnipeg Jets Mike Eastwood; 3rd round pick in 1995 (Brad Isbister)
June 27, 1995	To Philadelphia Flyers Russ Romaniuk	To Winnipeg Jets Jeff Finley
July 8, 1995	To Montreal Canadiens Stephane Quintal	To Winnipeg Jets 2nd round pick in 1995 (Jason Doig)
July 8, 1995	To Dallas Stars 3rd round pick in 1995 (Sergei Gusev)	To Winnipeg Jets 2nd round pick in 1996 (Remi Royer)

=== Waivers ===
January 18, 1995	To Edmonton Oilers Dean Kennedy
January 18, 1995	To Calgary Flames Sheldon Kennedy
January 18, 1995	From St. Louis Blues Igor Korolev
January 20, 1995	From Detroit Red Wings Craig Martin

=== Free agents ===
Player	New Team
Andy Brickley	New York Islanders

== Draft picks ==
Winnipeg's draft picks at the 1994 NHL entry draft held at the Hartford Civic Center in Hartford, Connecticut.

Round	Pick	Player	Nationality	College/junior/club team
2	30	Deron Quint (D)	United States	Seattle Thunderbirds (WHL)
3	56	Dorian Anneck (C)	Canada	Victoria Cougars (WHL)
3	58	Tavis Hansen (RW)	Canada	Tacoma Rockets (WHL)
4	82	Steve Cheredaryk (D)	Canada	Medicine Hat Tigers (WHL)
5	108	Craig Mills (RW)	Canada	Belleville Bulls (OHL)
6	143	Steve Vezina (G)	Canada	Beauport Harfangs (QMJHL)
6	146	Chris Kibermanis (D)	Canada	Red Deer Rebels (MJHL)
8	186	Ramil Saifullin (C)	Russia	Avangard Omsk (Russia)
9	212	Henrik Smangs (G)	Sweden	Leksands IF (Sweden)
10	238	Mike Mader (RW)	United States	Loomis Chaffee School (USHS-MA)
11	264	Jason Issel (LW)	Canada	Prince Albert Raiders (WHL)
S	4	Randy Stevens (RW)	United States	Michigan Technological University (WCHA)
