= 1994–95 Dallas Stars season =

National Hockey League team season

1994–95 Dallas Stars
- Division: 5th Central
- Conference: 8th Western
- 1994–95 record: 17–23–8
- Home record: 9–10–5
- Road record: 8–13–3
- Goals for: 136
- Goals against: 135

Team information
- General manager: Bob Gainey
- Coach: Bob Gainey
- Captain: Neal Broten (Jan.–Feb.); Derian Hatcher (Feb.–May)
- Arena: Reunion Arena
- Average attendance: 16,729
- Minor league affiliates: Kalamazoo Wings; Dayton Bombers

Team leaders
- Goals: Dave Gagner (14)
- Assists: Dave Gagner (28)
- Points: Dave Gagner (42)
- Penalty minutes: Shane Churla (186)
- Plus/minus: Paul Cavallini (+8)
- Wins: Andy Moog (10)
- Goals against average: Andy Moog (2.44)

The 1994–95 Dallas Stars season was the 28th season in franchise history and the second in Dallas, Texas. Injuries to forward Mike Modano caused him to miss 18 games, more than a third of the 48-game regular season, and finished with 29 points (12 goals, 17 assists). As a result, the Stars didn't have the same offensive power they had had in 1993–94, when Modano scored a career-high 50 goals and relied on Dave Gagner to pick up the slack, which he did, leading the team in goals, assists and points. Despite finishing the season on a 4-game losing streak for a 17-23-8 record, Dallas still scored more goals (136) than they allowed (135).

== Regular season ==
The Stars tied the Hartford Whalers and the Toronto Maple Leafs for the lowest shooting percentage during the regular season, with just 135 goals on 1,520 shots (8.9%).

=== Final standings ===
Central Division
| No. | CR | | GP | W | L | T | GF | GA | Pts |
|---|---|---|---|---|---|---|---|---|---|
| 1 | 1 | **Detroit Red Wings** | 48 | 33 | 11 | 4 | 180 | 117 | 70 |
| 2 | 2 | **St. Louis Blues** | 48 | 28 | 15 | 5 | 178 | 135 | 61 |
| 3 | 4 | **Chicago Blackhawks** | 48 | 24 | 19 | 5 | 156 | 115 | 53 |
| 4 | 5 | **Toronto Maple Leafs** | 48 | 21 | 19 | 8 | 135 | 146 | 50 |
| 5 | 8 | **Dallas Stars** | 48 | 17 | 23 | 8 | 136 | 135 | 42 |
| 6 | 10 | Winnipeg Jets | 48 | 16 | 25 | 7 | 157 | 177 | 39 |

Note: No. = Division rank, CR = Conference rank, W = Wins, L = Losses, T = Ties, GF = Goals For, GA = Goals Against, Pts = Points
Teams that qualified for the playoffs are highlighted in bold.

Western Conference
| R | | Div | GP | W | L | T | GF | GA | Pts |
|---|---|---|---|---|---|---|---|---|---|
| **1** | **p – Detroit Red Wings** | **CEN** | **48** | **33** | **11** | **4** | **180** | **117** | **70** |
| **2** | **x – Calgary Flames** | **PAC** | **48** | **24** | **17** | **7** | **163** | **135** | **55** |
| **3** | **St. Louis Blues** | **CEN** | **48** | **28** | **15** | **5** | **178** | **135** | **61** |
| **4** | **Chicago Blackhawks** | **CEN** | **48** | **24** | **19** | **5** | **156** | **115** | **53** |
| **5** | **Toronto Maple Leafs** | **CEN** | **48** | **21** | **19** | **8** | **135** | **146** | **50** |
| **6** | **Vancouver Canucks** | **PAC** | **48** | **18** | **18** | **12** | **153** | **148** | **48** |
| **7** | **San Jose Sharks** | **PAC** | **48** | **19** | **25** | **4** | **129** | **161** | **42** |
| **8** | **Dallas Stars** | **CEN** | **48** | **17** | **23** | **8** | **136** | **135** | **42** |
| 9 | Los Angeles Kings | PAC | 48 | 16 | 23 | 9 | 142 | 174 | 41 |
| 10 | Winnipeg Jets | CEN | 48 | 16 | 25 | 7 | 157 | 177 | 39 |
| 11 | Edmonton Oilers | PAC | 48 | 17 | 27 | 4 | 136 | 183 | 38 |
| 12 | Mighty Ducks of Anaheim | PAC | 48 | 16 | 27 | 5 | 125 | 164 | 37 |

Divisions: CEN – Central, PAC – Pacific

bold – Qualified for playoffs; x – Won division; p – Won Presidents' Trophy

== Playoffs ==
Despite having a 17-23-8 record, the Stars clinched the number eight seed in the Western Conference, thus making the playoffs for the second consecutive year. They lost to Detroit in the first round 4–1.

== Schedule and results ==
=== Regular season ===
1994–95 regular season
January: 2–2–1 (home: 0–1–0; road: 2–1–1)

| Game | Date | Score | Opponent | Record | Recap |
|---|---|---|---|---|---|
| 1 | January 20, 1995 | 1–1 OT | @ Vancouver Canucks (1994–95) | 0–0–1 | T |
| 2 | January 24, 1995 | 4–2 | @ Los Angeles Kings (1994–95) | 1–0–1 | W |
| 3 | January 25, 1995 | 4–1 | @ Mighty Ducks of Anaheim (1994–95) | 2–0–1 | W |
| 4 | January 28, 1995 | 2–3 | @ San Jose Sharks (1994–95) | 2–1–1 | L |
| 5 | January 30, 1995 | 1–2 | Toronto Maple Leafs (1994–95) | 2–2–1 | L |

February: 3–8–2 (home: 1–5–1; road: 2–3–1)

| Game | Date | Score | Opponent | Record | Recap |
|---|---|---|---|---|---|
| 6 | February 1, 1995 | 9–2 | Mighty Ducks of Anaheim (1994–95) | 3–2–1 | W |
| 7 | February 2, 1995 | 1–2 | San Jose Sharks (1994–95) | 3–3–1 | L |
| 8 | February 4, 1995 | 4–7 | @ St. Louis Blues (1994–95) | 3–4–1 | L |
| 9 | February 8, 1995 | 3–3 OT | @ Toronto Maple Leafs (1994–95) | 3–4–2 | T |
| 10 | February 11, 1995 | 0–6 | Calgary Flames (1994–95) | 3–5–2 | L |
| 11 | February 13, 1995 | 4–7 | Winnipeg Jets (1994–95) | 3–6–2 | L |
| 12 | February 15, 1995 | 1–3 | Los Angeles Kings (1994–95) | 3–7–2 | L |
| 13 | February 18, 1995 | 2–3 OT | @ Calgary Flames (1994–95) | 3–8–2 | L |
| 14 | February 20, 1995 | 2–1 | @ Calgary Flames (1994–95) | 4–8–2 | W |
| 15 | February 22, 1995 | 1–2 | @ Edmonton Oilers (1994–95) | 4–9–2 | L |
| 16 | February 24, 1995 | 3–3 OT | Vancouver Canucks (1994–95) | 4–9–3 | T |
| 17 | February 26, 1995 | 1–2 | Chicago Blackhawks (1994–95) | 4–10–3 | L |
| 18 | February 28, 1995 | 4–0 | @ Winnipeg Jets (1994–95) | 5–10–3 | W |

March: 6–5–2 (home: 5–1–2; road: 1–4–0)

| Game | Date | Score | Opponent | Record | Recap |
|---|---|---|---|---|---|
| 19 | March 1, 1995 | 5–3 | @ Edmonton Oilers (1994–95) | 6–10–3 | W |
| 20 | March 3, 1995 | 4–0 | Mighty Ducks of Anaheim (1994–95) | 7–10–3 | W |
| 21 | March 5, 1995 | 2–1 | St. Louis Blues (1994–95) | 8–10–3 | W |
| 22 | March 6, 1995 | 8–2 | Los Angeles Kings (1994–95) | 9–10–3 | W |
| 23 | March 8, 1995 | 2–3 | @ Toronto Maple Leafs (1994–95) | 9–11–3 | L |
| 24 | March 10, 1995 | 3–4 | @ Winnipeg Jets (1994–95) | 9–12–3 | L |
| 25 | March 12, 1995 | 4–4 OT | Calgary Flames (1994–95) | 9–12–4 | T |
| 26 | March 13, 1995 | 4–2 | Chicago Blackhawks (1994–95) | 10–12–4 | W |
| 27 | March 16, 1995 | 4–5 | @ Detroit Red Wings (1994–95) | 10–13–4 | L |
| 28 | March 22, 1995 | 4–4 OT | Edmonton Oilers (1994–95) | 10–13–5 | T |
| 29 | March 23, 1995 | 2–1 | Edmonton Oilers (1994–95) | 11–13–5 | W |
| 30 | March 27, 1995 | 2–3 | St. Louis Blues (1994–95) | 11–14–5 | L |
| 31 | March 30, 1995 | 2–3 | @ Detroit Red Wings (1994–95) | 11–15–5 | L |

April: 6–7–3 (home: 3–3–2; road: 3–4–1)

| Game | Date | Score | Opponent | Record | Recap |
|---|---|---|---|---|---|
| 32 | April 1, 1995 | 2–3 | Detroit Red Wings (1994–95) | 11–16–5 | L |
| 33 | April 2, 1995 | 2–1 | @ Chicago Blackhawks (1994–95) | 12–16–5 | W |
| 34 | April 4, 1995 | 2–2 OT | @ Vancouver Canucks (1994–95) | 12–16–6 | T |
| 35 | April 6, 1995 | 2–3 | @ Los Angeles Kings (1994–95) | 12–17–6 | L |
| 36 | April 7, 1995 | 2–0 | @ Mighty Ducks of Anaheim (1994–95) | 13–17–6 | W |
| 37 | April 9, 1995 | 3–2 | @ St. Louis Blues (1994–95) | 14–17–6 | W |
| 38 | April 11, 1995 | 1–4 | Detroit Red Wings (1994–95) | 14–18–6 | L |
| 39 | April 14, 1995 | 1–2 | @ Toronto Maple Leafs (1994–95) | 14–19–6 | L |
| 40 | April 16, 1995 | 2–0 | Chicago Blackhawks (1994–95) | 15–19–6 | W |
| 41 | April 17, 1995 | 2–2 OT | Vancouver Canucks (1994–95) | 15–19–7 | T |
| 42 | April 19, 1995 | 5–5 OT | San Jose Sharks (1994–95) | 15–19–8 | T |
| 43 | April 22, 1995 | 6–4 | Toronto Maple Leafs (1994–95) | 16–19–8 | W |
| 44 | April 23, 1995 | 5–2 | Winnipeg Jets (1994–95) | 17–19–8 | W |
| 45 | April 25, 1995 | 4–8 | St. Louis Blues (1994–95) | 17–20–8 | L |
| 46 | April 27, 1995 | 1–5 | @ Chicago Blackhawks (1994–95) | 17–21–8 | L |
| 47 | April 29, 1995 | 2–4 | @ Detroit Red Wings (1994–95) | 17–22–8 | L |

May: 0–1–0 (home: 0–0–0; road: 0–1–0)

| Game | Date | Score | Opponent | Record | Recap |
|---|---|---|---|---|---|
| 48 | May 1, 1995 | 1–3 | @ San Jose Sharks (1994–95) | 17–23–8 | L |

Legend: W Win (2 points) L Loss (0 points) T Tie (1 point)

=== Playoffs ===
1995 Stanley Cup playoffs
Western Conference Quarterfinals vs. (1) Detroit Red Wings – Red Wings win 4–1

| Game | Date | Score | Opponent | Series | Recap |
|---|---|---|---|---|---|
| 1 | May 7, 1995 | 3–4 | Detroit Red Wings | Red Wings lead 1–0 | L |
| 2 | May 9, 1995 | 1–4 | Detroit Red Wings | Red Wings lead 2–0 | L |
| 3 | May 11, 1995 | 1–5 | @ Detroit Red Wings | Red Wings lead 3–0 | L |
| 4 | May 14, 1995 | 4–1 | @ Detroit Red Wings | Red Wings lead 3–1 | W |
| 5 | May 15, 1995 | 1–3 | Detroit Red Wings | Red Wings win 4–1 | L |

Legend: W Win L Loss

== Player statistics ==
=== Scoring ===
- Position abbreviations: C = Center; D = Defense; G = Goaltender; LW = Left wing; RW = Right wing
- † = Joined team via a transaction (e.g., trade, waivers, signing) during the season. Stats reflect time with the Stars only.
- ‡ = Left team via a transaction (e.g., trade, waivers, release) during the season. Stats reflect time with the Stars only.

| No. | Player | Pos | Regular season | | | | | | Playoffs | | | | | |
| No. | Player | Pos | GP | G | A | Pts | +/- | PIM | GP | G | A | Pts | +/- | PIM |
|---|---|---|---|---|---|---|---|---|---|---|---|---|---|---|
| 15 | Dave Gagner | C | 48 | 14 | 28 | 42 | 2 | 42 | 5 | 1 | 1 | 2 | 0 | 4 |
| 9 | Mike Modano | C | 30 | 12 | 17 | 29 | 7 | 8 | — | — | — | — | — | — |
| 4 | Kevin Hatcher | D | 47 | 10 | 19 | 29 | −4 | 66 | 5 | 2 | 1 | 3 | −4 | 2 |
| 11 (Note: Donnelly wore number 6 in his first five games.) | Mike Donnelly† | LW | 35 | 11 | 14 | 25 | 3 | 29 | 5 | 0 | 1 | 1 | 0 | 6 |
| 22 | Trent Klatt | RW | 47 | 12 | 10 | 22 | −2 | 26 | 5 | 1 | 0 | 1 | 0 | 0 |
| 10 | Todd Harvey | RW | 40 | 11 | 9 | 20 | −3 | 67 | 5 | 0 | 0 | 0 | −1 | 8 |
| 39 | Mike Kennedy | C | 44 | 6 | 12 | 18 | 4 | 33 | 5 | 0 | 0 | 0 | −1 | 9 |
| 12 | Grant Ledyard | D | 38 | 5 | 13 | 18 | 6 | 20 | 3 | 0 | 0 | 0 | −2 | 2 |
| 6 | Corey Millen† | C | 28 | 3 | 15 | 18 | 4 | 28 | 5 | 1 | 0 | 1 | −1 | 2 |
| 26 | Russ Courtnall‡ | RW | 32 | 7 | 10 | 17 | −8 | 13 | — | — | — | — | — | — |
| 21 | Paul Broten | RW | 47 | 7 | 9 | 16 | −7 | 36 | 5 | 1 | 2 | 3 | −2 | 2 |
| 2 | Derian Hatcher | D | 43 | 5 | 11 | 16 | 3 | 105 | — | — | — | — | — | — |
| 16 | Dean Evason | C | 47 | 8 | 7 | 15 | 3 | 48 | 5 | 1 | 2 | 3 | 1 | 12 |
| 41 | Brent Gilchrist | LW | 32 | 9 | 4 | 13 | −3 | 16 | 5 | 0 | 1 | 1 | −1 | 2 |
| 14 | Paul Cavallini | D | 44 | 1 | 11 | 12 | 8 | 28 | 5 | 0 | 2 | 2 | 2 | 6 |
| 25 | Peter Zezel | C | 30 | 6 | 5 | 11 | −6 | 19 | 3 | 1 | 0 | 1 | 0 | 0 |
| 3 | Craig Ludwig | D | 47 | 2 | 7 | 9 | −6 | 61 | 4 | 0 | 1 | 1 | 5 | 2 |
| 23 | Greg Adams† | LW | 12 | 3 | 3 | 6 | −4 | 4 | 5 | 2 | 0 | 2 | 1 | 0 |
| 5 | Doug Zmolek | D | 42 | 0 | 5 | 5 | −6 | 67 | 5 | 0 | 0 | 0 | −2 | 10 |
| 27 | Shane Churla | RW | 27 | 1 | 3 | 4 | 0 | 186 | 5 | 0 | 0 | 0 | −1 | 20 |
| 7 | Neal Broten‡ | C | 17 | 0 | 4 | 4 | −8 | 4 | — | — | — | — | — | — |
| 23 | Alan May‡ | RW | 27 | 1 | 1 | 2 | 1 | 106 | — | — | — | — | — | — |
| 11 | Jarkko Varvio | RW | 5 | 1 | 1 | 2 | 1 | 0 | — | — | — | — | — | — |
| 24 | Richard Matvichuk | D | 14 | 0 | 2 | 2 | −7 | 14 | 5 | 0 | 2 | 2 | −3 | 4 |
| 43 | Gord Donnelly | D | 16 | 1 | 0 | 1 | 1 | 52 | — | — | — | — | — | — |
| 29 | Grant Marshall | RW | 2 | 0 | 1 | 1 | 1 | 0 | — | — | — | — | — | — |
| 35 | Andy Moog | G | 31 | 0 | 1 | 1 | | 14 | 5 | 0 | 0 | 0 | | 2 |
| 37 | Zac Boyer | RW | 1 | 0 | 0 | 0 | 0 | 0 | 2 | 0 | 0 | 0 | 0 | 0 |
| 30 | Manny Fernandez | G | 1 | 0 | 0 | 0 | | 0 | — | — | — | — | — | — |
| 20 | Iain Fraser†‡ | C | 4 | 0 | 0 | 0 | −3 | 0 | — | — | — | — | — | — |
| 18 | Mike Lalor | D | 12 | 0 | 0 | 0 | 0 | 9 | 3 | 0 | 0 | 0 | 2 | 2 |
| 20 (Note: Langenbrunner wore number 32 in his first game.) | Jamie Langenbrunner | RW | 2 | 0 | 0 | 0 | 0 | 2 | — | — | — | — | — | — |
| 38 | Mark Lawrence | RW | 2 | 0 | 0 | 0 | 0 | 0 | — | — | — | — | — | — |
| 28 | Travis Richards | D | 2 | 0 | 0 | 0 | 0 | 0 | — | — | — | — | — | — |
| 1 | Mike Torchia | G | 6 | 0 | 0 | 0 | | 0 | — | — | — | — | — | — |
| 34 | Darcy Wakaluk | G | 15 | 0 | 0 | 0 | | 4 | 1 | 0 | 0 | 0 | | 0 |

=== Goaltending ===
| No. | Player | Regular season | | | | | | | | | | Playoffs | | | | | | | | |
| No. | Player | GP | W | L | T | SA | GA | GAA | SV% | SO | TOI | GP | W | L | SA | GA | GAA | SV% | SO | TOI |
|---|---|---|---|---|---|---|---|---|---|---|---|---|---|---|---|---|---|---|---|---|
| 35 | Andy Moog | 31 | 10 | 12 | 7 | 846 | 72 | 2.44 | .915 | 2 | 1770 | 5 | 1 | 4 | 169 | 16 | 3.47 | .905 | 0 | 277 |
| 34 | Darcy Wakaluk | 15 | 4 | 8 | 0 | 341 | 40 | 3.18 | .883 | 2 | 754 | 1 | 0 | 0 | 9 | 1 | 3.00 | .889 | 0 | 20 |
| 1 | Mike Torchia | 6 | 3 | 2 | 1 | 172 | 18 | 3.30 | .895 | 0 | 327 | — | — | — | — | — | — | — | — | — |
| 30 | Manny Fernandez | 1 | 0 | 1 | 0 | 27 | 3 | 3.05 | .889 | 0 | 59 | — | — | — | — | — | — | — | — | — |

== Awards and records ==
=== Awards ===
| Type | Award/honor | Recipient | Ref |
|---|---|---|---|
| Team | Star of the Game Award | Andy Moog | |

=== Milestones ===
| Milestone | Player | Date | Ref |
|---|---|---|---|
| First game | Mike Kennedy | January 20, 1995 | |
| First game | Todd Harvey | January 25, 1995 | |
| First game | Mark Lawrence | February 4, 1995 | |
| First game | Travis Richards | February 15, 1995 | |
| First game | Grant Marshall | March 16, 1995 | |
| First game | Manny Fernandez | April 1, 1995 | |
| First game | Mike Torchia | April 2, 1995 | |
| First game | Jamie Langenbrunner | April 9, 1995 | |
| First game | Zac Boyer | April 19, 1995 | |

== Transactions ==
- April 7, 1995: RW Russ Courtnall traded from Dallas to Vancouver for LW Greg Adams and RW Dan Kesa and Vancouver's fifth round pick in 1995 Entry Draft.

== Draft picks ==
Dallas' draft picks at the 1994 NHL entry draft held at the Hartford Civic Center in Hartford, Connecticut.

| Round | Pick | Player | Nationality | College/junior/club team |
|---|---|---|---|---|
| 1 | 20 | Jason Botterill (LW) | Canada | University of Michigan (NCAA) |
| 2 | 46 | Lee Jinman (C) | Canada | North Bay Centennials (OHL) |
| 4 | 98 | Jamie Wright (LW) | Canada | Guelph Storm (OHL) |
| 5 | 124 | Marty Turco (G) | Canada | Cambridge Winterhawks (MWJHL) |
| 6 | 150 | Evgeny Petrochinin (D) | Russia | Spartak Moscow (Russia) |
| 9 | 228 | Marty Flichel (RW) | Canada | Tacoma Rockets (WHL) |
| 10 | 254 | Jimmy Roy (C) | Canada | Thunder Bay Flyers (USHL) |
| 11 | 280 | Chris Szysky (RW) | Canada | Swift Current Broncos (WHL) |
