= 1994–95 Mighty Ducks of Anaheim season =

NHL team season

1994–95 Mighty Ducks of Anaheim
- Division: 6th Pacific
- Conference: 12th Western
- 1994–95 record: 16–27–5
- Home record: 11–9–4
- Road record: 5–18–1
- Goals for: 125
- Goals against: 164

Team information
- General manager: Jack Ferreira
- Coach: Ron Wilson
- Captain: Randy Ladouceur
- Alternate captains: Bob Corkum; Todd Ewen
- Arena: Arrowhead Pond of Anaheim
- Average attendance: 17,174 (100%); Total: 412,176
- Minor league affiliates: San Diego Gulls (IHL); Greensboro Monarchs (ECHL)

Team leaders
- Goals: Paul Kariya (18)
- Assists: Paul Kariya, Shaun Van Allen (21)
- Points: Paul Kariya (39)
- Penalty minutes: Stu Grimson (110)
- Plus/minus: Steve Rucchin (+7)
- Wins: Guy Hebert (12)
- Goals against average: Guy Hebert (3.13)

The 1994–95 Mighty Ducks of Anaheim season was the second season in franchise history. The Ducks missed the playoffs for the second year in a row. Despite a Conference-worst 5–18–1 road record, the team played well at home with an 11–9–4 record. On April 4, the team traded enforcer Stu Grimson, Mark Ferner and the team's sixth-round choice in the 1996 NHL entry draft to the Detroit Red Wings in exchange for Mike Sillinger and Jason York. Twenty-year-old rookie Paul Kariya was a candidate for the Calder Memorial Trophy as the NHL's top rookie, scoring 18 goals and 39 points in 47 games (the award ultimately went to the Quebec Nordiques' Peter Forsberg).

== Off-season ==
Defenseman Randy Ladouceur is named team captain, following the departure of Troy Loney.

== Regular season ==
The Mighty Ducks finished last in power-play percentage (11.39%) and penalty-kill percentage (75.65%) in the NHL. The team was also shut out an NHL-high six times during the regular season.

=== Final standings ===
Pacific Division
No.	CR		GP	W	L	T	GF	GA	Pts
1	2	**Calgary Flames**	48	24	17	7	163	135	55
2	6	**Vancouver Canucks**	48	18	18	12	153	148	48
3	7	**San Jose Sharks**	48	19	25	4	129	161	42
4	9	Los Angeles Kings	48	16	23	9	142	174	41
5	11	Edmonton Oilers	48	17	27	4	136	183	38
6	12	Mighty Ducks of Anaheim	48	16	27	5	125	164	37

Note: No. = Division rank, CR = Conference rank, W = Wins, L = Losses, T = Ties, GF = Goals For, GA = Goals Against, Pts = Points
Teams that qualified for the playoffs are highlighted in bold.

Western Conference
R		Div	GP	W	L	T	GF	GA	Pts
**1**	**p – Detroit Red Wings**	**CEN**	**48**	**33**	**11**	**4**	**180**	**117**	**70**
**2**	**x – Calgary Flames**	**PAC**	**48**	**24**	**17**	**7**	**163**	**135**	**55**
**3**	**St. Louis Blues**	**CEN**	**48**	**28**	**15**	**5**	**178**	**135**	**61**
**4**	**Chicago Blackhawks**	**CEN**	**48**	**24**	**19**	**5**	**156**	**115**	**53**
**5**	**Toronto Maple Leafs**	**CEN**	**48**	**21**	**19**	**8**	**135**	**146**	**50**
**6**	**Vancouver Canucks**	**PAC**	**48**	**18**	**18**	**12**	**153**	**148**	**48**
**7**	**San Jose Sharks**	**PAC**	**48**	**19**	**25**	**4**	**129**	**161**	**42**
**8**	**Dallas Stars**	**CEN**	**48**	**17**	**23**	**8**	**136**	**135**	**42**
9	Los Angeles Kings	PAC	48	16	23	9	142	174	41
10	Winnipeg Jets	CEN	48	16	25	7	157	177	39
11	Edmonton Oilers	PAC	48	17	27	4	136	183	38
12	Mighty Ducks of Anaheim	PAC	48	16	27	5	125	164	37

Divisions: CEN – Central, PAC – Pacific

bold – Qualified for playoffs; x – Won division; p – Won Presidents' Trophy

== Schedule and results ==
1994–95 regular season
January: 3–3–0 (home: 2–1–0; road: 1–2–0)

Game	Date	Visitor	Score	Home	OT	Decision	Record	Points	Recap
1	January 20	Anaheim	1–2	Edmonton		Hebert	0–1–0	0	L
2	January 21	Anaheim	4–3	Winnipeg		Shtalenkov	1–1–0	2	W
3	January 23	Edmonton	4–5	Anaheim	OT	Hebert	2–1–0	4	W
4	January 25	Dallas	4–1	Anaheim		Shtalenkov	2–2–0	4	L
5	January 27	Winnipeg	2–3	Anaheim		Hebert	3–2–0	6	W
6	January 31	Anaheim	2–7	St. Louis		Hebert	3–3–0	6	L

February: 2–8–1 (home: 0–3–1; road: 2–5–0)

Game	Date	Visitor	Score	Home	OT	Decision	Record	Points	Recap
7	February 1	Anaheim	2–9	St. Louis		Shtalenkov	3–4–0	6	L
8	February 3	Detroit	5–2	Anaheim		Hebert	3–5–0	6	L
9	February 5	Anaheim	3–2	Los Angeles		Shtalenkov	4–5–0	8	W
10	February 7	Chicago	3–0	Anaheim		Shtalenkov	4–6–0	8	L
11	February 9	Anaheim	1–5	Calgary		Hebert	4–7–0	8	L
12	February 12	Anaheim	0–2	Edmonton		Hebert	4–8–0	8	L
13	February 17	Vancouver	2–2	Anaheim	OT	Hebert	4–8–1	9	T
14	February 18	Anaheim	6–3	San Jose		Hebert	5–8–1	11	W
15	February 23	Anaheim	1–3	Toronto		Hebert	5–9–1	11	L
16	February 24	Anaheim	2–4	Winnipeg		Shtalenkov	5–10–1	11	L
17	February 26	Calgary	5–3	Anaheim		Hebert	5–11–1	11	L

March: 4–8–3 (home: 2–1–3; road: 2–7–0)

Game	Date	Visitor	Score	Home	OT	Decision	Record	Points	Recap
18	March 1	Chicago	1–3	Anaheim		Hebert	6–11–1	13	W
19	March 3	Anaheim	0–4	Dallas		Hebert	6–12–1	13	L
20	March 5	Anaheim	0–3	Chicago		Hebert	6–13–1	13	L
21	March 7	Anaheim	3–6	St. Louis		Shtalenkov	6–14–1	13	L
22	March 9	Detroit	4–4	Anaheim	OT	Hebert	6–14–2	14	T
23	March 11	Anaheim	3–5	Vancouver		Hebert	6–15–2	14	L
24	March 15	Anaheim	5–0	Calgary		Hebert	7–15–2	16	W
25	March 17	Toronto	3–3	Anaheim	OT	Hebert	7–15–3	17	T
26	March 19	St. Louis	4–2	Anaheim		Hebert	7–16–3	17	L
27	March 21	Los Angeles	3–3	Anaheim	OT	Shtalenkov	7–16–4	18	T
28	March 23	Anaheim	6–3	San Jose		Hebert	8–16–4	20	W
29	March 26	Anaheim	2–5	Chicago		Hebert	8–17–4	20	L
30	March 28	Anaheim	4–6	Detroit		Hebert	8–18–4	20	L
31	March 30	Winnipeg	1–3	Anaheim		Hebert	9–18–4	22	W
32	March 31	Anaheim	1–6	Vancouver		Hebert	9–19–4	22	L

April: 6–7–1 (home: 6–3–0; road: 0–4–1)

Game	Date	Visitor	Score	Home	OT	Decision	Record	Points	Recap
33	April 2	San Jose	4–5	Anaheim		Hebert	10–19–4	24	W
34	April 5	Edmonton	3–4	Anaheim	OT	Shtalenkov	11–19–4	26	W
35	April 7	Dallas	2–0	Anaheim		Hebert	11–20–4	26	L
36	April 9	Los Angeles	1–5	Anaheim		Hebert	12–20–4	28	W
37	April 11	Anaheim	0–5	Vancouver		Hebert	12–21–4	28	L
38	April 13	Calgary	2–4	Anaheim		Hebert	13–21–4	30	W
39	April 15	Vancouver	3–1	Anaheim		Hebert	13–22–4	30	L
40	April 17	San Jose	0–3	Anaheim		Hebert	14–22–4	32	W
41	April 19	Anaheim	2–3	Toronto		Hebert	14–23–4	32	L
42	April 21	Anaheim	5–6	Detroit		Shtalenkov	14–24–4	32	L
43	April 23	Anaheim	2–2	Los Angeles	OT	Hebert	14–24–5	33	T
44	April 24	Calgary	1–2	Anaheim		Hebert	15–24–5	35	W
45	April 26	San Jose	5–2	Anaheim		Hebert	15–25–5	35	L
46	April 30	Anaheim	1–2	Los Angeles		Hebert	15–26–5	35	L

May: 1–1–0 (home: 1–1–0; road: 0–0–0)

Game	Date	Visitor	Score	Home	OT	Decision	Record	Points	Recap
47	May 1	St. Louis	5–3	Anaheim		Shtalenkov	15–27–5	35	L
48	May 3	Toronto	1–6	Anaheim		Shtalenkov	16–27–5	37	W

Legend: W Win (2 points) L Loss (0 points) T Tie (1 point)

== Player statistics ==
=== Scoring ===
- Position abbreviations: C = Center; D = Defense; G = Goaltender; LW = Left wing; RW = Right wing
- † = Joined team via a transaction (e.g., trade, waivers, signing) during the season. Stats reflect time with the Mighty Ducks only.
- ‡ = Left team via a transaction (e.g., trade, waivers, release) during the season. Stats reflect time with the Mighty Ducks only.

No.	Player	Pos	Regular season					
No.	Player	Pos	GP	G	A	Pts	+/-	PIM
9	Paul Kariya	RW	47	18	21	39	−17	4
22	Shaun Van Allen	C	45	8	21	29	−4	32
47	Stephan Lebeau	C	38	8	16	24	6	12
25	Todd Krygier†	LW	35	11	11	22	1	10
16	Peter Douris	LW	46	10	11	21	4	12
21	Patrik Carnback	LW	41	6	15	21	−8	32
2	Bobby Dollas	D	45	7	13	20	−3	12
19 (Note: Corkum wore number 20 through March 7.)	Bob Corkum	RW	44	10	9	19	−7	25
14	Joe Sacco	RW	41	10	8	18	−8	23
20 (Note: Rucchin wore number 15 through March 5.)	Steve Rucchin	C	43	6	11	17	7	23
10	Oleg Tverdovsky	D	36	3	9	12	−6	14
11	Valeri Karpov	RW	30	4	7	11	−4	6
7	Milos Holan†	D	25	2	8	10	4	14
18	Garry Valk	LW	36	3	6	9	−4	34
3	Jason York†	D	15	0	8	8	4	12
24	Tom Kurvers	D	22	4	3	7	−13	6
19	Anatoli Semenov‡	C	15	3	4	7	−10	4
26	Mike Sillinger†	C	15	2	5	7	1	6
29	Randy Ladouceur	D	44	2	4	6	2	36
15	Dave Karpa†	D	26	1	5	6	0	91
27	John Lilley	C	9	2	2	4	2	5
4	David Williams	D	21	2	2	4	−5	26
5	Robert Dirk	D	38	1	3	4	−3	56
42	Denny Lambert	LW	13	1	3	4	3	4
8	Tim Sweeney	LW	13	1	1	2	−3	2
12	David Sacco	LW	8	0	2	2	−3	0
3	Mark Ferner‡	D	14	0	1	1	−4	6
32	Stu Grimson‡	LW	31	0	1	1	−7	110
48	Darren Van Impe	D	1	0	1	1	0	4
36	Todd Ewen	RW	24	0	0	0	−2	90
31	Guy Hebert	G	39	0	0	0		2
23	Jason Marshall	D	1	0	0	0	−2	0
6	Don McSween	D	2	0	0	0	0	0
35	Mikhail Shtalenkov	G	18	0	0	0		2

=== Goaltending ===
No.	Player	Regular season										
No.	Player	GP	GS	W	L	T	SA	GA	GAA	SV%	SO	TOI
31	Guy Hebert	39	35	12	20	4	1,132	109	3.13	.904	2	2,091:52
35	Mikhail Shtalenkov	18	13	4	7	1	448	49	3.63	.891	0	809:32

== Awards and records ==
=== Awards ===
Type	Award/honor	Recipient	Ref
League (annual)	NHL All-Rookie Team	Paul Kariya (Forward)	

=== Milestones ===
Milestone	Player	Date	Ref
First game	Paul Kariya	January 20, 1995	
First game	Valeri Karpov	January 20, 1995	
First game	Steve Rucchin	January 20, 1995	
First game	Oleg Tverdovsky	January 21, 1995	
First game	Denny Lambert	April 5, 1995	
First game	Darren Van Impe	May 3, 1995	

== Transactions ==
=== Trades ===
Date	Details	
June 28, 1994	To Ottawa Senators Sean Hill; 1994 9th-round pick (#210 overall)	To Mighty Ducks of Anaheim 1994 3rd-round pick (#55 overall)
June 29, 1994	To New York Islanders Troy Loney	To Mighty Ducks of Anaheim Tom Kurvers
June 29, 1994	To Tampa Bay Lightning 1994 OTT 3rd-round pick (#55 overall)	To Mighty Ducks of Anaheim 1994 WSH 3rd-round pick (#67 overall); 1995 4th-round pick (#82 overall)
July 12, 1994	To Chicago Blackhawks 1995 TB 4th-round pick (#82 overall)	To Mighty Ducks of Anaheim Robert Dirk
August 29, 1994	To St. Louis Blues Bill Houlder	To Mighty Ducks of Anaheim Jason Marshall
August 31, 1994	To New York Islanders 1995 9th-round pick (#211 overall)	To Mighty Ducks of Anaheim Darren Van Impe
September 28, 1994	To Toronto Maple Leafs Terry Yake	To Mighty Ducks of Anaheim David Sacco
February 2, 1995	To Washington Capitals 1996 4th-round pick (#90 overall)	To Mighty Ducks of Anaheim Todd Krygier
March 8, 1995	To Philadelphia Flyers Anatoli Semenov	To Mighty Ducks of Anaheim Milos Holan
March 9, 1995	To Quebec Nordiques 1997 4th-round pick (#98 overall)	To Mighty Ducks of Anaheim Dave Karpa
April 4, 1995	To Detroit Red Wings Stu Grimson; Mark Ferner; 1996 6th-round pick (#144 overall)	To Mighty Ducks of Anaheim Mike Sillinger; Jason York

=== Signings ===
Date	Player	Contract term
September 1, 1994	Paul Kariya	

=== Free agents ===
Date	Player	Team
July 22, 1994	Robin Bawa	to Dallas Stars
August 1, 1994	Brian Sullivan	
February 14, 1995	Sean Pronger	
May 31, 1995	Jarrod Skalde	

== Draft picks ==
Anaheim's draft picks at the 1994 NHL entry draft held at the Hartford Civic Center in Hartford, Connecticut.

Round	Pick	Player	Position	Nationality	College/junior/club team
1	2	Oleg Tverdovsky	D	Russia	Krylia Sovetov (Russia)
2	28	Johan Davidsson	LW	Sweden	HV71 (Sweden)
3^{1}	67	Craig Reichert	RW	Canada	Red Deer Rebels (WHL)
4	80	Byron Briske	D	Canada	Red Deer Rebels (WHL)
5	106	Pavel Trnka	D	Czech Republic	HC Plzen (Czech Republic)
6	132	Bates Battaglia	LW	United States	Caledon Canadians (OHA-B)
7	158	Rocky Welsing	D	United States	Wisconsin Capitols (USHL)
8	184	Brad Englehart	LW	Canada	Kimball Union High School (USHS–NY)
10	236	Tommi Miettinen	C	Finland	KalPa (Finland)
11	262	Jeremy Stevenson	LW	United States	Sault Ste. Marie Greyhounds (OHL)
S	2	Steve Rucchin	C	Canada	University of Western Ontario (OUAA)

Notes

1. The Mighty Ducks acquired this pick as the result of a trade on June 29, 1994, that sent Ottawa's third-round pick in 1994 (55th overall) to Tampa Bay in exchange for a fourth-round pick in 1995 and this pick.
  Tampa Bay previously acquired this pick as the result of a trade on March 21, 1994, that sent Joe Reekie to Washington in exchange for Enrico Ciccone, Tampa Bay's conditional fifth-round pick in 1995 and this pick.
- The Mighty Ducks third-round pick went to the Montreal Canadiens as the result of a trade on August 10, 1993, that sent Todd Ewen and Patrik Carnback to Anaheim in exchange for this pick (54th overall).
- The Mighty Ducks ninth-round pick went to the Ottawa Senators as the result of a trade on June 28, 1994, that sent a third-round pick in 1994 (55th overall) to Anaheim in exchange for Sean Hill and this pick (210th overall).

== See also ==
- 1994–95 NHL season
