= 1994–95 Chicago Blackhawks season =

National Hockey League team season

1994–95 Chicago Blackhawks
- Division: 3rd Central
- Conference: 4th Western
- 1994–95 record: 24–19–5
- Home record: 11–10–3
- Road record: 13–9–2
- Goals for: 156
- Goals against: 115

Team information
- General manager: Bob Pulford
- Coach: Darryl Sutter
- Captain: Dirk Graham
- Alternate captains: Chris Chelios; Jeremy Roenick
- Arena: United Center
- Average attendance: 20,832
- Minor league affiliates: Indianapolis Ice; Flint Generals

Team leaders
- Goals: Joe Murphy (23)
- Assists: Bernie Nicholls (29)
- Points: Bernie Nicholls (51)
- Penalty minutes: Steve Smith (128)
- Plus/minus: Chris Chelios (+17)
- Wins: Ed Belfour (22)
- Goals against average: Ed Belfour (2.28)

The 1994–95 Chicago Blackhawks season was the Hawks' 69th season. It was the Blackhawks' first season at United Center, which replaced Chicago Stadium as their home venue. The Hawks ended the regular season on a high note, winning their final five games. They tied the Detroit Red Wings for most power play goals (52) and had the best power play in the league (24.53%). They also allowed the fewest goals (115) and the fewest even-strength goals (76) during the regular season. It was an inconsistent season for the team, as they had three 5-game winning streaks (February 1 to 9; March 16 to 26; and April 25 to May 3) and one 13-game winless streak from March 29 to April 23. Within their winless streak, they lost 8 games in a row. Points-leader Bernie Nicholls had 3 hat tricks, including two four-goal games (the first one came on February 5 and the second one came on February 28). Nicholls' three-goal game came on March 21 in a 7-3 Blackhawks' win at San Jose.

== Regular season ==
The Blackhawks were one of only 3 teams in 1994–95 to have a better regular-season record on the road than at home (the other 2 teams were the Florida Panthers and the Los Angeles Kings).

=== Season standings ===
Central Division
No.	CR		GP	W	L	T	GF	GA	Pts
1	1	**Detroit Red Wings**	48	33	11	4	180	117	70
2	2	**St. Louis Blues**	48	28	15	5	178	135	61
3	4	**Chicago Blackhawks**	48	24	19	5	156	115	53
4	5	**Toronto Maple Leafs**	48	21	19	8	135	146	50
5	8	**Dallas Stars**	48	17	23	8	136	135	42
6	10	Winnipeg Jets	48	16	25	7	157	177	39

Note: No. = Division rank, CR = Conference rank, W = Wins, L = Losses, T = Ties, GF = Goals For, GA = Goals Against, Pts = Points
Teams that qualified for the playoffs are highlighted in bold.

Western Conference
R		Div	GP	W	L	T	GF	GA	Pts
**1**	**p – Detroit Red Wings**	**CEN**	**48**	**33**	**11**	**4**	**180**	**117**	**70**
**2**	**x – Calgary Flames**	**PAC**	**48**	**24**	**17**	**7**	**163**	**135**	**55**
**3**	**St. Louis Blues**	**CEN**	**48**	**28**	**15**	**5**	**178**	**135**	**61**
**4**	**Chicago Blackhawks**	**CEN**	**48**	**24**	**19**	**5**	**156**	**115**	**53**
**5**	**Toronto Maple Leafs**	**CEN**	**48**	**21**	**19**	**8**	**135**	**146**	**50**
**6**	**Vancouver Canucks**	**PAC**	**48**	**18**	**18**	**12**	**153**	**148**	**48**
**7**	**San Jose Sharks**	**PAC**	**48**	**19**	**25**	**4**	**129**	**161**	**42**
**8**	**Dallas Stars**	**CEN**	**48**	**17**	**23**	**8**	**136**	**135**	**42**
9	Los Angeles Kings	PAC	48	16	23	9	142	174	41
10	Winnipeg Jets	CEN	48	16	25	7	157	177	39
11	Edmonton Oilers	PAC	48	17	27	4	136	183	38
12	Mighty Ducks of Anaheim	PAC	48	16	27	5	125	164	37

Divisions: CEN – Central, PAC – Pacific

bold – Qualified for playoffs; x – Won division; p – Won Presidents' Trophy

== Playoffs ==
In the Stanley Cup Playoffs, the Blackhawks defeated the Toronto Maple Leafs in a tight 7-game series, swept the Vancouver Canucks, and then lost to the Detroit Red Wings in the Western Conference Finals in 5 games; 3 of those games went into overtime (Detroit won all 3).

== Schedule and results ==
=== Regular season ===
1994–95 regular season
January: 3–3–0 (home: 2–0–0; road: 1–3–0)

Game	Date	Score	Opponent	Record	Recap
1	January 20, 1995	1–4	@ Detroit Red Wings (1994–95)	0–1–0	L
2	January 23, 1995	3–5	@ Winnipeg Jets (1994–95)	0–2–0	L
3	January 25, 1995	5–1	Edmonton Oilers (1994–95)	1–2–0	W
4	January 27, 1995	4–1	Toronto Maple Leafs (1994–95)	2–2–0	W
5	January 29, 1995	6–3	@ Los Angeles Kings (1994–95)	3–2–0	W
6	January 30, 1995	1–2	@ San Jose Sharks (1994–95)	3–3–0	L

February: 9–2–1 (home: 2–1–1; road: 7–1–0)

Game	Date	Score	Opponent	Record	Recap
7	February 1, 1995	7–0	@ Edmonton Oilers (1994–95)	4–3–0	W
8	February 3, 1995	4–3 OT	@ Calgary Flames (1994–95)	5–3–0	W
9	February 5, 1995	9–4	@ Vancouver Canucks (1994–95)	6–3–0	W
10	February 7, 1995	3–0	@ Mighty Ducks of Anaheim (1994–95)	7–3–0	W
11	February 9, 1995	5–0	@ St. Louis Blues (1994–95)	8–3–0	W
12	February 13, 1995	2–4	@ Toronto Maple Leafs (1994–95)	8–4–0	L
13	February 16, 1995	2–2 OT	Calgary Flames (1994–95)	8–4–1	T
14	February 19, 1995	4–1	Edmonton Oilers (1994–95)	9–4–1	W
15	February 20, 1995	3–2	San Jose Sharks (1994–95)	10–4–1	W
16	February 23, 1995	2–4	Detroit Red Wings (1994–95)	10–5–1	L
17	February 26, 1995	2–1	@ Dallas Stars (1994–95)	11–5–1	W
18	February 28, 1995	8–4	@ Los Angeles Kings (1994–95)	12–5–1	W

March: 7–5–2 (home: 3–3–1; road: 4–2–1)

Game	Date	Score	Opponent	Record	Recap
19	March 1, 1995	1–3	@ Mighty Ducks of Anaheim (1994–95)	12–6–1	L
20	March 3, 1995	5–2	@ Edmonton Oilers (1994–95)	13–6–1	W
21	March 5, 1995	3–0	Mighty Ducks of Anaheim (1994–95)	14–6–1	W
22	March 7, 1995	3–6	Calgary Flames (1994–95)	14–7–1	L
23	March 9, 1995	3–4	Los Angeles Kings (1994–95)	14–8–1	L
24	March 11, 1995	2–2 OT	@ Toronto Maple Leafs (1994–95)	14–8–2	T
25	March 13, 1995	2–4	@ Dallas Stars (1994–95)	14–9–2	L
26	March 16, 1995	9–2	Vancouver Canucks (1994–95)	15–9–2	W
27	March 19, 1995	3–2	@ Winnipeg Jets (1994–95)	16–9–2	W
28	March 21, 1995	7–3	@ San Jose Sharks (1994–95)	17–9–2	W
29	March 23, 1995	3–1	@ Vancouver Canucks (1994–95)	18–9–2	W
30	March 26, 1995	5–2	Mighty Ducks of Anaheim (1994–95)	19–9–2	W
31	March 29, 1995	1–3	St. Louis Blues (1994–95)	19–10–2	L
32	March 31, 1995	3–3 OT	Toronto Maple Leafs (1994–95)	19–10–3	T

April: 3–9–2 (home: 2–6–1; road: 1–3–1)

Game	Date	Score	Opponent	Record	Recap
33	April 2, 1995	1–2	Dallas Stars (1994–95)	19–11–3	L
34	April 4, 1995	2–3	@ Calgary Flames (1994–95)	19–12–3	L
35	April 5, 1995	1–4	@ Winnipeg Jets (1994–95)	19–13–3	L
36	April 9, 1995	1–4	Detroit Red Wings (1994–95)	19–14–3	L
37	April 12, 1995	2–3	San Jose Sharks (1994–95)	19–15–3	L
38	April 14, 1995	1–3	Detroit Red Wings (1994–95)	19–16–3	L
39	April 16, 1995	0–2	@ Dallas Stars (1994–95)	19–17–3	L
40	April 17, 1995	1–3	Toronto Maple Leafs (1994–95)	19–18–3	L
41	April 19, 1995	2–2 OT	St. Louis Blues (1994–95)	19–18–4	T
42	April 21, 1995	1–2	Winnipeg Jets (1994–95)	19–19–4	L
43	April 23, 1995	2–2 OT	@ St. Louis Blues (1994–95)	19–19–5	T
44	April 25, 1995	4–3 OT	Vancouver Canucks (1994–95)	20–19–5	W
45	April 27, 1995	5–1	Dallas Stars (1994–95)	21–19–5	W
46	April 30, 1995	4–0	@ Detroit Red Wings (1994–95)	22–19–5	W

May: 2–0–0 (home: 2–0–0; road: 0–0–0)

Game	Date	Score	Opponent	Record	Recap
47	May 1, 1995	3–2	Winnipeg Jets (1994–95)	23–19–5	W
48	May 3, 1995	5–1	Los Angeles Kings (1994–95)	24–19–5	W

Legend: W Win (2 points) L Loss (0 points) T Tie (1 point)

=== Playoffs ===
1995 Stanley Cup playoffs
Western Conference Quarterfinals vs. (5) Toronto Maple Leafs – Blackhawks win 4–3

Game	Date	Score	Opponent	Series	Recap
1	May 7, 1995	3–5	Toronto Maple Leafs	Maple Leafs lead 1–0	L
2	May 9, 1995	0–3	Toronto Maple Leafs	Maple Leafs lead 2–0	L
3	May 11, 1995	3–2	@ Toronto Maple Leafs	Maple Leafs lead 2–1	W
4	May 13, 1995	3–1	@ Toronto Maple Leafs	Series tied 2–2	W
5	May 15, 1995	4–2	Toronto Maple Leafs	Blackhawks lead 3–2	W
6	May 17, 1995	4–5 OT	@ Toronto Maple Leafs	Series tied 3–3	L
7	May 19, 1995	5–2	Toronto Maple Leafs	Blackhawks win 4–3	W

Western Conference Semifinals vs. (6) Vancouver Canucks – Blackhawks win 4–0

Game	Date	Score	Opponent	Series	Recap
1	May 21, 1995	2–1 OT	Vancouver Canucks	Blackhawks lead 1–0	W
2	May 23, 1995	2–0	Vancouver Canucks	Blackhawks lead 2–0	W
3	May 25, 1995	3–2 OT	@ Vancouver Canucks	Blackhawks lead 3–0	W
4	May 27, 1995	4–3 OT	@ Vancouver Canucks	Blackhawks win 4–0	W

Western Conference Finals vs. (1) Detroit Red Wings – Red Wings win 4–1

Game	Date	Score	Opponent	Series	Recap
1	June 1, 1995	1–2 OT	@ Detroit Red Wings	Red Wings lead 1–0	L
2	June 4, 1995	2–3	@ Detroit Red Wings	Red Wings lead 2–0	L
3	June 6, 1995	3–4 2OT	Detroit Red Wings	Red Wings lead 3–0	L
4	June 8, 1995	5–2	Detroit Red Wings	Red Wings lead 3–1	W
5	June 11, 1995	1–2 2OT	@ Detroit Red Wings	Red Wings win 4–1	L

Legend: W Win L Loss

== Player statistics ==
=== Scoring ===
- Position abbreviations: C = Center; D = Defense; G = Goaltender; LW = Left wing; RW = Right wing
- † = Joined team via a transaction (e.g., trade, waivers, signing) during the season. Stats reflect time with the Blackhawks only.
- ‡ = Left team via a transaction (e.g., trade, waivers, release) during the season. Stats reflect time with the Blackhawks only.

No.	Player	Pos	Regular season						Playoffs					
No.	Player	Pos	GP	G	A	Pts	+/-	PIM	GP	G	A	Pts	+/-	PIM
92	Bernie Nicholls	C	48	22	29	51	4	32	16	1	11	12	0	8
17	Joe Murphy	RW	40	23	18	41	7	89	16	9	3	12	−1	29
7	Chris Chelios	D	48	5	33	38	17	72	16	4	7	11	6	12
20	Gary Suter	D	48	10	27	37	14	42	12	2	5	7	−1	10
10	Tony Amonte	RW	48	15	20	35	7	41	16	3	3	6	3	10
27	Jeremy Roenick	C	33	10	24	34	5	14	8	1	2	3	−2	16
44	Patrick Poulin	LW	45	15	15	30	13	53	16	4	1	5	1	8
25	Sergei Krivokrasov	LW	41	12	7	19	9	33	10	0	0	0	0	8
11	Jeff Shantz	LW	45	6	12	18	11	33	16	3	1	4	0	2
12	Brent Sutter	C	47	7	8	15	6	51	16	1	2	3	1	4
33	Dirk Graham	RW	40	4	9	13	2	42	16	2	3	5	6	8
2	Eric Weinrich	D	48	3	10	13	1	33	16	1	5	6	8	4
5	Steve Smith	D	48	1	12	13	6	128	16	0	1	1	2	26
14	Paul Ysebaert‡	LW	15	4	5	9	4	6	—	—	—	—	—	—
18	Denis Savard†	C	12	4	4	8	3	8	16	7	11	18	12	10
32	Murray Craven†	LW	16	4	3	7	2	2	16	5	5	10	2	4
22	Christian Ruuttu‡	LW	20	2	5	7	3	6	—	—	—	—	—	—
19	Brent Grieve	LW	24	1	5	6	2	23	—	—	—	—	—	—
15	Jim Cummins†	RW	27	3	1	4	−3	117	14	1	1	2	3	4
8	Cam Russell	D	33	1	3	4	4	88	16	0	3	3	4	8
30	Ed Belfour	G	42	0	3	3		11	16	0	0	0		6
3	Greg Smyth	D	22	0	3	3	2	33	—	—	—	—	—	—
55	Eric Daze	LW	4	1	1	2	2	2	16	0	1	1	−4	4
4	Keith Carney	D	18	1	0	1	−1	11	4	0	1	1	0	0
6	Gerald Diduck†	D	13	1	0	1	3	48	16	1	3	4	−4	22
26	Roger Johansson	D	11	1	0	1	1	6	—	—	—	—	—	—
34	Tony Horacek	LW	19	0	1	1	−4	25	—	—	—	—	—	—
22 (Note: Dubinsky wore number 32 in his first four games.)	Steve Dubinsky	C	16	0	0	0	−5	8	—	—	—	—	—	—
23	Daniel Gauthier	LW	5	0	0	0	0	0	—	—	—	—	—	—
31	Jeff Hackett	G	7	0	0	0		0	2	0	0	0		0
29	Darin Kimble	RW	14	0	0	0	−5	30	—	—	—	—	—	—
23	Rich Sutter‡	RW	15	0	0	0	1	28	—	—	—	—	—	—
49	Jimmy Waite†	G	2	0	0	0		0	—	—	—	—	—	—

=== Goaltending ===
- † = Joined team via a transaction (e.g., trade, waivers, signing) during the season. Stats reflect time with the Blackhawks only.

No.	Player	Regular season										Playoffs								
No.	Player	GP	W	L	T	SA	GA	GAA	SV%	SO	TOI	GP	W	L	SA	GA	GAA	SV%	SO	TOI
30	Ed Belfour	42	22	15	3	990	93	2.28	.906	5	2450	16	9	7	479	37	2.19	.923	1	1014
49	Jimmy Waite†	2	1	1	0	51	5	2.53	.902	0	119	—	—	—	—	—	—	—	—	—
31	Jeff Hackett	7	1	3	2	150	13	2.38	.913	0	328	2	0	0	11	1	2.28	.909	0	26

== Awards and records ==
=== Awards ===
Type	Award/honor	Recipient	Ref
League (annual)	NHL First All-Star team	Chris Chelios (Defense)	
League (annual)	NHL Second All-Star team	Ed Belfour (Goaltender)	
League (annual)	William M. Jennings Trophy	Ed Belfour	

=== Milestones ===
Milestone	Player	Date	Ref
25th shutout	Ed Belfour	February 7, 1995	
First game	Daniel Gauthier	March 3, 1995	
First game	Eric Daze	April 27, 1995	

== Draft picks ==
Chicago's draft picks at the 1994 NHL entry draft held at the Hartford Civic Center in Hartford, Connecticut.

Round	Pick	Player	Nationality	College/junior/club team
1	14	Ethan Moreau (LW)	Canada	Niagara Falls Thunder (OHL)
2	40	Jean-Yves Leroux (LW)	Canada	Beauport Harfangs (QMJHL)
4	85	Steve McLaren (LW)	Canada	North Bay Centennials (OHL)
5	118	Marc Dupuis (D)	Canada	Belleville Bulls (OHL)
6	144	Jim Ensom (C)	Canada	North Bay Centennials (OHL)
7	170	Tyler Prosofsky (C)	Canada	Tacoma Rockets (WHL)
8	196	Mike Josephson (LW)	Canada	Kamloops Blazers (WHL)
9	222	Lubomir Jandera (D)	Czech Republic	Chemopetrol Litvinov (Czech)
10	248	Lars Weibel (G)	Switzerland	HC Lugano (Switzerland)
11	263	Rob Mara (RW)	United States	Belmont Hill High School (USHS-MA)
