= 1994–95 Detroit Red Wings season =

Sports season

1994–95 Detroit Red Wings
- Presidents' Trophy winners
- Western Conference champions
- Central Division champions
- Division: 1st Central
- Conference: 1st Western
- 1994–95 record: 33–11–4
- Home record: 17–4–3
- Road record: 16–7–1
- Goals for: 180
- Goals against: 117

Team information
- General manager: Scotty Bowman; Jim Devellano
- Coach: Scotty Bowman
- Captain: Steve Yzerman
- Alternate captains: Dino Ciccarelli; Paul Coffey; Sergei Fedorov; Mark Howe; Bob Rouse
- Arena: Joe Louis Arena
- Average attendance: 19,779
- Minor league affiliates: Adirondack Red Wings; Toledo Storm; Detroit Falcons

Team leaders
- Goals: Ray Sheppard (30)
- Assists: Paul Coffey (44)
- Points: Paul Coffey (58)
- Penalty minutes: Vladimir Konstantinov (101)
- Plus/minus: Paul Coffey (+18)
- Wins: Mike Vernon (19)
- Goals against average: Chris Osgood (2.26)

The 1994–95 Detroit Red Wings season was the Red Wings' 63rd season, the franchise's 69th. The Red Wings started the 1994–95 season and finished it equally strong, compiling a record of 33–11–4 for 70 points in 48 games. With the league's best regular-season record, they earned the Presidents' Trophy. They tied the Chicago Blackhawks for most power-play goals with 52 and had the second-best power-play in the league (24.64%). Veteran forward Ray Sheppard netted 30 goals on just 125 shots.

== Regular season ==
=== Season standings ===
Central Division
No.	CR		GP	W	L	T	GF	GA	Pts
1	1	**Detroit Red Wings**	48	33	11	4	180	117	70
2	2	**St. Louis Blues**	48	28	15	5	178	135	61
3	4	**Chicago Blackhawks**	48	24	19	5	156	115	53
4	5	**Toronto Maple Leafs**	48	21	19	8	135	146	50
5	8	**Dallas Stars**	48	17	23	8	136	135	42
6	10	Winnipeg Jets	48	16	25	7	157	177	39

Note: No. = Division rank, CR = Conference rank, W = Wins, L = Losses, T = Ties, GF = Goals For, GA = Goals Against, Pts = Points
Teams that qualified for the playoffs are highlighted in bold.

Western Conference
R		Div	GP	W	L	T	GF	GA	Pts
**1**	**p – Detroit Red Wings**	**CEN**	**48**	**33**	**11**	**4**	**180**	**117**	**70**
**2**	**x – Calgary Flames**	**PAC**	**48**	**24**	**17**	**7**	**163**	**135**	**55**
**3**	**St. Louis Blues**	**CEN**	**48**	**28**	**15**	**5**	**178**	**135**	**61**
**4**	**Chicago Blackhawks**	**CEN**	**48**	**24**	**19**	**5**	**156**	**115**	**53**
**5**	**Toronto Maple Leafs**	**CEN**	**48**	**21**	**19**	**8**	**135**	**146**	**50**
**6**	**Vancouver Canucks**	**PAC**	**48**	**18**	**18**	**12**	**153**	**148**	**48**
**7**	**San Jose Sharks**	**PAC**	**48**	**19**	**25**	**4**	**129**	**161**	**42**
**8**	**Dallas Stars**	**CEN**	**48**	**17**	**23**	**8**	**136**	**135**	**42**
9	Los Angeles Kings	PAC	48	16	23	9	142	174	41
10	Winnipeg Jets	CEN	48	16	25	7	157	177	39
11	Edmonton Oilers	PAC	48	17	27	4	136	183	38
12	Mighty Ducks of Anaheim	PAC	48	16	27	5	125	164	37

Divisions: CEN – Central, PAC – Pacific

bold – Qualified for playoffs; x – Won division; p – Won Presidents' Trophy

== Playoffs ==
The Red Wings dominated the first three rounds of the 1995 NHL playoffs, going 12–2 and outscoring their opponents 54–28 during that span. On Sunday, June 11, the Red Wings advanced to the Stanley Cup Finals for the first time since 1966 with a thrilling 2–1 double-overtime victory against the Chicago Blackhawks in Game 5 of the 1995 Western Conference Finals. Forward Vyacheslav Kozlov scored the game-winner at 2:25 of the second overtime period.

However, the Red Wings were stunned in the 1995 Stanley Cup Finals, suffering a four-game sweep at the hands of the underdog New Jersey Devils, whose neutral-zone trap system held Detroit to just seven goals in the series.

== Schedule and results ==
=== Regular season ===
1994–95 regular season
January: 5–1–0 (home: 4–1–0; road: 1–0–0)

Game	Date	Score	Opponent	Record	Recap
1	January 20, 1995	4–1	Chicago Blackhawks (1994–95)	1–0–0	W
2	January 22, 1995	1–4	Calgary Flames (1994–95)	1–1–0	L
3	January 24, 1995	6–3	Vancouver Canucks (1994–95)	2–1–0	W
4	January 26, 1995	5–1	Calgary Flames (1994–95)	3–1–0	W
5	January 28, 1995	5–2	Edmonton Oilers (1994–95)	4–1–0	W
6	January 30, 1995	4–2	@ Edmonton Oilers (1994–95)	5–1–0	W

February: 7–4–1 (home: 3–2–1; road: 4–2–0)

Game	Date	Score	Opponent	Record	Recap
7	February 1, 1995	1–2	@ Calgary Flames (1994–95)	5–2–0	L
8	February 3, 1995	5–2	@ Mighty Ducks of Anaheim (1994–95)	6–2–0	W
9	February 4, 1995	3–4	@ Los Angeles Kings (1994–95)	6–3–0	L
10	February 7, 1995	6–0	San Jose Sharks (1994–95)	7–3–0	W
11	February 10, 1995	1–2	Toronto Maple Leafs (1994–95)	7–4–0	L
12	February 12, 1995	4–4 OT	Los Angeles Kings (1994–95)	7–4–1	T
13	February 15, 1995	5–1	@ Winnipeg Jets (1994–95)	8–4–1	W
14	February 17, 1995	4–2	Edmonton Oilers (1994–95)	9–4–1	W
15	February 20, 1995	4–2	@ Toronto Maple Leafs (1994–95)	10–4–1	W
16	February 22, 1995	4–1	Toronto Maple Leafs (1994–95)	11–4–1	W
17	February 23, 1995	4–2	@ Chicago Blackhawks (1994–95)	12–4–1	W
18	February 25, 1995	2–3	St. Louis Blues (1994–95)	12–5–1	L

March: 10–2–1 (home: 7–0–0; road: 3–2–1)

Game	Date	Score	Opponent	Record	Recap
19	March 2, 1995	6–1	Winnipeg Jets (1994–95)	13–5–1	W
20	March 5, 1995	2–4	@ Edmonton Oilers (1994–95)	13–6–1	L
21	March 6, 1995	5–2	@ Vancouver Canucks (1994–95)	14–6–1	W
22	March 9, 1995	4–4 OT	@ Mighty Ducks of Anaheim (1994–95)	14–6–2	T
23	March 12, 1995	2–1	@ St. Louis Blues (1994–95)	15–6–2	W
24	March 14, 1995	5–2	Los Angeles Kings (1994–95)	16–6–2	W
25	March 16, 1995	5–4	Dallas Stars (1994–95)	17–6–2	W
26	March 17, 1995	3–1	Vancouver Canucks (1994–95)	18–6–2	W
27	March 22, 1995	6–3	Winnipeg Jets (1994–95)	19–6–2	W
28	March 24, 1995	2–3	@ Calgary Flames (1994–95)	19–7–2	L
29	March 25, 1995	2–1	@ Vancouver Canucks (1994–95)	20–7–2	W
30	March 28, 1995	6–4	Mighty Ducks of Anaheim (1994–95)	21–7–2	W
31	March 30, 1995	3–2	Dallas Stars (1994–95)	22–7–2	W

April: 10–4–2 (home: 3–1–2; road: 7–3–0)

Game	Date	Score	Opponent	Record	Recap
32	April 1, 1995	3–2	@ Dallas Stars (1994–95)	23–7–2	W
33	April 2, 1995	3–3 OT	St. Louis Blues (1994–95)	23–7–3	T
34	April 5, 1995	5–3	@ San Jose Sharks (1994–95)	24–7–3	W
35	April 7, 1995	4–2	@ Toronto Maple Leafs (1994–95)	25–7–3	W
36	April 9, 1995	4–1	@ Chicago Blackhawks (1994–95)	26–7–3	W
37	April 11, 1995	4–1	@ Dallas Stars (1994–95)	27–7–3	W
38	April 13, 1995	3–0	San Jose Sharks (1994–95)	28–7–3	W
39	April 14, 1995	3–1	@ Chicago Blackhawks (1994–95)	29–7–3	W
40	April 16, 1995	5–6	@ St. Louis Blues (1994–95)	29–8–3	L
41	April 19, 1995	5–5 OT	Winnipeg Jets (1994–95)	29–8–4	T
42	April 21, 1995	6–5	Mighty Ducks of Anaheim (1994–95)	30–8–4	W
43	April 23, 1995	5–1	@ San Jose Sharks (1994–95)	31–8–4	W
44	April 25, 1995	1–5	@ Los Angeles Kings (1994–95)	31–9–4	L
45	April 27, 1995	3–4	@ Winnipeg Jets (1994–95)	31–10–4	L
46	April 29, 1995	4–2	Dallas Stars (1994–95)	32–10–4	W
47	April 30, 1995	0–4	Chicago Blackhawks (1994–95)	32–11–4	L

May: 1–0–0 (home: 0–0–0; road: 1–0–0)

Game	Date	Score	Opponent	Record	Recap
48	May 3, 1995	3–2	@ St. Louis Blues (1994–95)	33–11–4	W

Legend: W Win (2 points) L Loss (0 points) T Tie (1 point)

=== Playoffs ===
1995 Stanley Cup playoffs
Western Conference Quarterfinals vs. (8) Dallas Stars: Detroit won 4–1

Game	Date	Score	Opponent	Record	Recap
1	May 7, 1995	4–3	Dallas Stars	Red Wings lead 1–0	W
2	May 9, 1995	4–1	Dallas Stars	Red Wings lead 2–0	W
3	May 11, 1995	5–1	@ Dallas Stars	Red Wings lead 3–0	W
4	May 14, 1995	1–4	@ Dallas Stars	Red Wings lead 3–1	L
5	May 15, 1995	3–1	Dallas Stars	Red Wings win 4–1	W

Western Conference Semifinals vs. (7) San Jose Sharks: Detroit won 4–0

Game	Date	Score	Opponent	Record	Recap
1	May 21, 1995	6–0	San Jose Sharks	Red Wings lead 1–0	W
2	May 23, 1995	6–2	San Jose Sharks	Red Wings lead 2–0	W
3	May 25, 1995	6–2	@ San Jose Sharks	Red Wings lead 3–0	W
4	May 27, 1995	6–2	@ San Jose Sharks	Red Wings win 4–0	W

Western Conference Finals vs. (4) Chicago Blackhawks: Detroit won 4–1

Game	Date	Score	Opponent	Record	Recap
1	June 1, 1995	2–1 OT	Chicago Blackhawks	Red Wings lead 1–0	W
2	June 4, 1995	3–2	Chicago Blackhawks	Red Wings lead 2–0	W
3	June 6, 1995	4–3 2OT	@ Chicago Blackhawks	Red Wings lead 3–0	W
4	June 8, 1995	2–5	@ Chicago Blackhawks	Red Wings lead 3–1	L
5	June 11, 1995	2–1 2OT	Chicago Blackhawks	Red Wings win 4–1	W

Stanley Cup Finals vs. (E5) New Jersey Devils: New Jersey won 4–0

Game	Date	Score	Opponent	Record	Recap
1	June 17, 1995	1–2	New Jersey Devils	Devils lead 1–0	L
2	June 20, 1995	2–4	New Jersey Devils	Devils lead 2–0	L
3	June 22, 1995	2–5	@ New Jersey Devils	Devils lead 3–0	L
4	June 24, 1995	2–5	@ New Jersey Devils	Devils win 4–0	L

Legend: W Win L Loss

== Player statistics ==
=== Scoring ===
- Position abbreviations: C = Center; D = Defense; G = Goaltender; LW = Left wing; RW = Right wing
- † = Joined team via a transaction (e.g., trade, waivers, signing) during the season. Stats reflect time with the Red Wings only.
- ‡ = Left team via a transaction (e.g., trade, waivers, release) during the season. Stats reflect time with the Red Wings only.

No.	Player	Pos	Regular season						Playoffs					
No.	Player	Pos	GP	G	A	Pts	+/-	PIM	GP	G	A	Pts	+/-	PIM
77	Paul Coffey	D	45	14	44	58	18	72	18	6	12	18	4	10
91	Sergei Fedorov	C	42	20	30	50	6	24	17	7	17	24	13	6
22	Dino Ciccarelli	RW	42	16	27	43	12	39	16	9	2	11	−4	22
55	Keith Primeau	C	45	15	27	42	17	99	17	4	5	9	−2	45
26	Ray Sheppard	RW	43	30	10	40	11	17	17	4	3	7	−6	5
19	Steve Yzerman	C	47	12	26	38	6	40	15	4	8	12	−2	0
13	Vyacheslav Kozlov	LW	46	13	20	33	12	45	18	9	7	16	12	10
5	Nicklas Lidstrom	D	43	10	16	26	15	6	18	4	12	16	4	8
17	Doug Brown	RW	45	9	12	21	14	16	18	4	8	12	14	2
21	Bob Errey†	LW	30	6	11	17	9	31	18	1	5	6	0	30
11	Shawn Burr	LW	42	6	8	14	13	60	16	0	2	2	−2	6
44	Viacheslav Fetisov†	D	14	3	11	14	3	2	18	0	8	8	1	14
16	Vladimir Konstantinov	D	47	3	11	14	10	101	18	1	1	2	6	22
25	Darren McCarty	RW	31	5	8	13	5	88	18	3	2	5	3	14
20	Martin Lapointe	RW	39	4	6	10	1	73	2	0	1	1	1	8
23	Greg Johnson	C	22	3	5	8	1	14	1	0	0	0	1	0
33	Kris Draper	C	36	2	6	8	1	22	18	4	1	5	−2	12
12	Mike Sillinger‡	C	13	2	6	8	3	2	—	—	—	—	—	—
3	Bob Rouse	D	48	1	7	8	14	36	18	0	3	3	2	8
4	Mark Howe	D	18	1	5	6	−3	10	3	0	0	0	2	0
18	Mike Krushelnyski	LW	20	2	3	5	3	6	8	0	0	0	1	0
37	Tim Taylor	C	22	0	4	4	3	16	6	0	1	1	−4	12
2	Terry Carkner	D	20	1	2	3	7	21	—	—	—	—	—	—
15	Mike Ramsey	D	33	1	2	3	11	23	15	0	1	1	2	4
27 (Note: York wore number 40 in his first five games.)	Jason York‡	D	10	1	2	3	0	2	—	—	—	—	—	—
21	Bob Halkidis‡	D	4	0	1	1	2	6	—	—	—	—	—	—
8	Aaron Ward	D	1	0	1	1	1	2	—	—	—	—	—	—
27 (Note: Ferner wore number 21 in his first two games.)	Mark Ferner†	D	3	0	0	0	0	0	—	—	—	—	—	—
32	Stu Grimson†	LW	11	0	0	0	−4	37	11	1	0	1	0	26
14	Andrew McKim	C	2	0	0	0	0	2	—	—	—	—	—	—
30	Chris Osgood	G	19	0	0	0		2	2	0	0	0		0
29	Mike Vernon	G	30	0	0	0		8	18	0	0	0		0

=== Goaltending ===
No.	Player	Regular season										Playoffs								
No.	Player	GP	W	L	T	SA	GA	GAA	SV%	SO	TOI	GP	W	L	SA	GA	GAA	SV%	SO	TOI
29	Mike Vernon	30	19	6	4	710	76	2.52	.893	1	1807	18	12	6	370	41	2.31	.889	1	1063
30	Chris Osgood	19	14	5	0	496	41	2.26	.917	1	1087	2	0	0	25	2	1.78	.920	0	68

== Awards and records ==
=== Awards ===
Type	Award/honor	Recipient	Ref
League (annual)	James Norris Memorial Trophy	Paul Coffey	
League (annual)	NHL First All-Star team	Paul Coffey (Defense)	

=== Milestones ===
Milestone	Player	Date	Ref
1,000th game played	Mike Ramsey	February 20, 1995	
1,000th game played	Dino Ciccarelli	March 28, 1995	

== Transactions ==
=== Trades ===
June 29, 1994	To Calgary Flames Steve Chiasson	To Detroit Red Wings Mike Vernon

== Draft picks ==
Detroit's draft picks at the 1994 NHL entry draft held at the Hartford Civic Center in Hartford, Connecticut.

Round	Pick	Player	Nationality	College/junior/club team
1	23	Yan Golubovsky (D)	Russia	CSKA Moscow (Russia)
2	49	Mathieu Dandenault (RW)	Canada	Sherbrooke Faucons (QMJHL)
3	75	Sean Gillam (D)	Canada	Spokane Chiefs (WHL)
5	114	Frederic Deschenes (G)	Canada	Granby Bisons (QMJHL)
5	127	Doug Battaglia (LW)	Canada	Brockville Braves (CJHL)
6	153	Pavel Agarkov (RW)	Russia	Krylya Sovetov (Russia)
8	205	Jason Elliott (G)	Canada	Cornell University (ECAC)
9	231	Jeff Mikesch (C)	United States	Michigan Technological University (WCHA)
10	257	Tomas Holmstrom (LW)	Sweden	Bodens BK (Sweden)
11	283	Toivo Suursoo (RW)	Estonia	Krylya Sovetov (Russia)
