= 1994–95 Calgary Flames season =

NHL team season

1994–95 Calgary Flames
- Pacific Division champions
- Division: 1st Pacific
- Conference: 2nd Western
- 1994–95 record: 24–17–7
- Home record: 15–7–2
- Road record: 9–10–5
- Goals for: 163
- Goals against: 135

Team information
- General manager: Doug Risebrough
- Coach: Dave King
- Captain: Joe Nieuwendyk
- Alternate captains: Theoren Fleury; Joel Otto
- Arena: Olympic Saddledome
- Average attendance: 19,036
- Minor league affiliate: Saint John Flames

Team leaders
- Goals: Theoren Fleury (29)
- Assists: Phil Housley (35)
- Points: Theoren Fleury (58)
- Penalty minutes: Ron Stern (163)
- Plus/minus: Phil Housley (+17)
- Wins: Trevor Kidd (22)
- Goals against average: Trevor Kidd (2.61)

The 1994–95 Calgary Flames season was the 15th National Hockey League season in Calgary. The season was shortened to 48 games by a 104-day lockout that would delay the start of the season until late January. This season saw the continued dismantling of the 1989 championship team, as both Mike Vernon and Al MacInnis were traded prior to the lockout.

The Flames captured their second consecutive Pacific Division title, earning the second seed in the playoffs. The division championship would be the Flames' last until they won the Northwest Division in 2005–06.

Theoren Fleury finished sixth in the league in both goals (29) and points (58). Fleury was also named to the NHL Second All-Star Team following the season.

Joe Nieuwendyk won the King Clancy Memorial Trophy as the player who "best exemplifies leadership qualities on and off the ice." He became the second Flame to win the award, preceded by Lanny McDonald, who won the trophy in its inaugural year of 1987–88.

The playoffs would be a repeat of recent disappointment for the Flames, as they were once again felled by the 7th seeded team in the West in seven games, this time by the San Jose Sharks. The Flames lost the series despite outscoring the Sharks by 9 goals over the 7 games. Fleury was magnificent in the series, scoring 7 goals and adding 7 assists for 14 points.

== Regular season ==
During the regular season, the Flames were shorthanded a league-high 249 times.

=== Season standings ===
Pacific Division
No.	CR		GP	W	L	T	GF	GA	Pts
1	2	**Calgary Flames**	48	24	17	7	163	135	55
2	6	**Vancouver Canucks**	48	18	18	12	153	148	48
3	7	**San Jose Sharks**	48	19	25	4	129	161	42
4	9	Los Angeles Kings	48	16	23	9	142	174	41
5	11	Edmonton Oilers	48	17	27	4	136	183	38
6	12	Mighty Ducks of Anaheim	48	16	27	5	125	164	37

Note: No. = Division rank, CR = Conference rank, W = Wins, L = Losses, T = Ties, GF = Goals For, GA = Goals Against, Pts = Points
Teams that qualified for the playoffs are highlighted in bold.

Western Conference
R		Div	GP	W	L	T	GF	GA	Pts
**1**	**p – Detroit Red Wings**	**CEN**	**48**	**33**	**11**	**4**	**180**	**117**	**70**
**2**	**x – Calgary Flames**	**PAC**	**48**	**24**	**17**	**7**	**163**	**135**	**55**
**3**	**St. Louis Blues**	**CEN**	**48**	**28**	**15**	**5**	**178**	**135**	**61**
**4**	**Chicago Blackhawks**	**CEN**	**48**	**24**	**19**	**5**	**156**	**115**	**53**
**5**	**Toronto Maple Leafs**	**CEN**	**48**	**21**	**19**	**8**	**135**	**146**	**50**
**6**	**Vancouver Canucks**	**PAC**	**48**	**18**	**18**	**12**	**153**	**148**	**48**
**7**	**San Jose Sharks**	**PAC**	**48**	**19**	**25**	**4**	**129**	**161**	**42**
**8**	**Dallas Stars**	**CEN**	**48**	**17**	**23**	**8**	**136**	**135**	**42**
9	Los Angeles Kings	PAC	48	16	23	9	142	174	41
10	Winnipeg Jets	CEN	48	16	25	7	157	177	39
11	Edmonton Oilers	PAC	48	17	27	4	136	183	38
12	Mighty Ducks of Anaheim	PAC	48	16	27	5	125	164	37

Divisions: CEN – Central, PAC – Pacific

bold – Qualified for playoffs; x – Won division; p – Won Presidents' Trophy

== Playoffs ==
The Flames were the second seed in the Western Conference for the second year in a row, however their playoff frustration would continue as they were once again defeated in seven games, this time by the San Jose Sharks. It was a high scoring series, as the Flames set a team record for most goals in a playoff series (35), while the two teams combined for an NHL record for most goals in a seven-game series (61). The Flames tied an NHL record for most shorthanded goals in a series (5), while their nine goals in game three tied a franchise record for goals in a game. Theo Fleury led the team tying a team record for goals in one series (7), while setting a new mark for points (14). Head coach Dave King would end up losing his job over this playoff loss. He was replaced by Pierre Page in the summer.

The Flames game 5 victory would prove to be their last playoff win until 2004 - a span of nine years, as the Flames would lose their next seven playoff games, sandwiched between a stretch of seven straight non-playoff seasons.

== Schedule and results ==
=== Regular season ===
1994–95 regular season
January: 2–2–1 (home: 1–0–0; road: 1–2–1)

Game	Date	Visitor	Score	Home	OT	Record	Pts	Recap
1	January 20	Calgary	3 – 3	Winnipeg	OT	0–0–1	1	T
2	January 22	Calgary	4 – 1	Detroit		1–0–1	3	W
3	January 24	St. Louis	4 – 6	Calgary		2–0–1	5	W
4	January 26	Calgary	1 – 5	Detroit		2–1–1	5	L
5	January 28	Calgary	1 – 2	Toronto		2–2–1	5	L

February: 8–4–2 (home: 5–3–0; road: 3–1–2)

Game	Date	Visitor	Score	Home	OT	Record	Pts	Recap
6	February 1	Detroit	1 – 2	Calgary		3–2–1	7	W
7	February 3	Chicago	4 – 3	Calgary	OT	3–3–1	7	L
8	February 4	Toronto	1 – 4	Calgary		4–3–1	9	W
9	February 6	Winnipeg	5 – 4	Calgary		4–4–1	9	L
10	February 9	Anaheim	5 – 1	Calgary		5–4–1	11	W
11	February 11	Calgary	6 – 0	Dallas		6–4–1	13	W
12	February 13	Calgary	2 – 4	St. Louis		6–5–1	13	L
13	February 16	Calgary	2 – 2	Chicago	OT	6–5–2	14	T
14	February 18	Dallas	2 – 3	Calgary	OT	7–5–2	16	W
15	February 20	Dallas	2 – 1	Calgary		7–6–2	16	L
16	February 23	Calgary	3 – 3	Los Angeles	OT	7–6–3	17	T
17	February 24	Calgary	3 – 0	San Jose		8–6–3	19	W
18	February 26	Calgary	5 – 3	Anaheim		9–6–3	21	W
19	February 28	Edmonton	2 – 5	Calgary		10–6–3	23	W

March: 6–7–2 (home: 4–3–1; road: 2–4–1)

Game	Date	Visitor	Score	Home	OT	Record	Pts	Recap
20	March 2	Vancouver	2 – 2	Calgary	OT	10–6–4	24	T
21	March 4	Calgary	2 – 3	Toronto		10–7–4	24	L
22	March 5	Calgary	2 – 3	Winnipeg		10–8–4	24	L
23	March 7	Calgary	6 – 3	Chicago		11–8–4	26	W
24	March 9	Calgary	1 – 5	St. Louis		11–9–4	26	L
25	March 12	Calgary	4 – 4	Dallas		11–9–5	27	T
26	March 15	Anaheim	5 – 0	Calgary		11–10–5	27	L
27	March 17	Winnipeg	4 – 8	Calgary		12–10–5	29	W
28	March 19	San Jose	5 – 3	Calgary		12–11–5	29	L
29	March 20	Calgary	2 – 5	Edmonton		12–12–5	29	L
30	March 22	St. Louis	3 – 4	Calgary		13–12–5	31	W
31	March 24	Detroit	2 – 3	Calgary		14–12–5	33	W
32	March 26	Vancouver	0 – 2	Calgary		15–12–5	35	W
33	March 28	Los Angeles	5 – 3	Calgary		15–13–5	35	L
34	March 31	Calgary	6 – 2	Edmonton		16–13–5	37	W

April: 7–4–2 (home: 4–1–1; road: 3–3–1)

Game	Date	Visitor	Score	Home	OT	Record	Pts	Recap
35	April 4	Chicago	2 – 3	Calgary		17–13–5	39	W
36	April 7	Los Angeles	4 – 7	Calgary		18–13–5	41	W
37	April 8	Vancouver	4 – 2	Calgary		18–14–5	41	L
38	April 10	San Jose	3 – 8	Calgary		19–14–5	43	W
39	April 12	Calgary	4 – 1	Los Angeles		20–14–5	45	W
40	April 13	Calgary	2 – 4	Anaheim		20–15–5	45	L
41	April 15	Calgary	4 – 2	Edmonton		21–15–5	47	W
42	April 17	Los Angeles	2 – 5	Calgary		22–15–5	49	W
43	April 20	Calgary	2 – 2	Vancouver	OT	22–15–6	50	T
44	April 24	Calgary	1 – 2	Anaheim		22–16–6	50	L
45	April 25	Calgary	3 – 2	San Jose		23–16–6	52	W
46	April 29	Toronto	2 – 2	Calgary	OT	23–16–7	53	T
47	April 30	Calgary	4 – 6	Vancouver		23–17–7	53	L

May: 1–0–0 (home: 1–0–0; road: 0–0–0)

Game	Date	Visitor	Score	Home	OT	Record	Pts	Recap
48	May 3	Edmonton	3 – 5	Calgary		24–17–7	55	W

Legend: W Win (2 points) L Loss (0 points) T Tie (1 point)

=== Playoffs ===
1995 Stanley Cup playoffs
Western Conference Quarterfinals vs. San Jose Sharks (7) – San Jose wins 4–3

Game	Date	Visitor	Score	Home	OT	Attendance	Series	Recap
1	May 7	San Jose	5 – 4	Calgary		15,624	San Jose leads 1–0	L
2	May 9	San Jose	5 – 4	Calgary	OT	16,389	San Jose leads 2–0	L
3	May 11	Calgary	9 – 2	San Jose		17,190	San Jose leads 2–1	W
4	May 13	Calgary	6 – 4	San Jose		17,190	Series tied 2–2	W
5	May 15	San Jose	0 – 5	Calgary		18,298	Calgary leads 3–2	W
6	May 17	Calgary	3 – 5	San Jose		17,190	Series tied 3–3	L
7	May 19	San Jose	5 – 4	Calgary	2OT	20,230	San Jose wins 4–3	L

Legend: W Win L Loss

== Player statistics ==
=== Scoring ===
- Position abbreviations: C = Centre; D = Defence; G = Goaltender; LW = Left wing; RW = Right wing
- † = Joined team via a transaction (e.g., trade, waivers, signing) during the season. Stats reflect time with the Flames only.

No.	Player	Pos	Regular season						Playoffs					
No.	Player	Pos	GP	G	A	Pts	+/-	PIM	GP	G	A	Pts	+/-	PIM
14	Theoren Fleury	RW	47	29	29	58	6	112	7	7	7	14	8	2
25	Joe Nieuwendyk	C	46	21	29	50	11	33	5	4	3	7	0	0
6	Phil Housley	D	43	8	35	43	17	18	7	0	9	9	5	0
26	Robert Reichel	C	48	18	17	35	−2	28	7	2	4	6	1	4
33	Zarley Zalapski	D	48	4	24	28	9	46	7	0	4	4	7	4
21	Steve Chiasson	D	45	2	23	25	10	39	7	1	2	3	9	9
13	German Titov	LW	40	12	12	24	6	16	7	5	3	8	1	10
29	Joel Otto	C	47	8	13	21	8	130	7	0	3	3	2	2
17	Wes Walz	RW	47	6	12	18	7	11	1	0	0	0	0	0
12	Paul Kruse	LW	45	11	5	16	13	141	7	4	2	6	2	10
23	Sheldon Kennedy	RW	30	7	8	15	5	45	7	3	1	4	3	16
22	Ron Stern	RW	39	9	4	13	4	163	7	3	1	4	4	8
4	Kevin Dahl	D	34	4	8	12	8	38	3	0	0	0	−1	0
11	Kelly Kisio	C	12	7	4	11	2	6	7	3	2	5	0	19
32	Mike Sullivan	LW	34	4	7	11	−2	14	7	3	5	8	5	2
5	James Patrick	D	43	0	10	10	−3	14	5	0	1	1	−2	0
15	Sandy McCarthy	RW	37	5	3	8	1	101	6	0	1	1	−2	17
39	Dan Keczmer	D	28	2	3	5	7	10	7	0	1	1	0	2
16	Nikolai Borschevsky†	RW	8	0	5	5	−7	0	—	—	—	—	—	—
3	Frank Musil	D	35	0	5	5	6	61	5	0	1	1	0	0
10	Gary Roberts	LW	8	2	2	4	1	43	—	—	—	—	—	—
41	Alan May†	LW	7	1	2	3	2	13	—	—	—	—	—	—
19	Vesa Viitakoski	LW	10	1	2	3	−1	6	—	—	—	—	—	—
16	Mark Greig	RW	8	1	1	2	1	2	—	—	—	—	—	—
42	Ed Ward†	RW	2	1	1	2	−2	2	—	—	—	—	—	—
20	Cory Stillman	C	10	0	2	2	1	2	—	—	—	—	—	—
18	Trent Yawney	D	37	0	2	2	−4	108	2	0	0	0	−4	2
38	Todd Hlushko	C	2	0	1	1	1	2	1	0	0	0	0	2
37	Trevor Kidd	G	43	0	1	1		2	7	0	0	0		0
92	Michael Nylander	C	6	0	1	1	1	2	6	0	6	6	−3	2
24	Jim Peplinski†	LW	6	0	1	1	−2	11	—	—	—	—	—	—
31	Rick Tabaracci†	G	5	0	1	1		0	1	0	0	0		0
7	Jamie Allison	D	1	0	0	0	0	0	—	—	—	—	—	—
34	Joel Bouchard	D	2	0	0	0	0	0	—	—	—	—	—	—
35	Neil Eisenhut	C	3	0	0	0	0	0	—	—	—	—	—	—
28	Len Esau†	D	1	0	0	0	−2	0	—	—	—	—	—	—
7	Steve Konroyd†	D	1	0	0	0	0	0	—	—	—	—	—	—
27	Scott Morrow	LW	4	0	0	0	0	0	—	—	—	—	—	—
36	Jason Muzzatti	G	1	0	0	0		0	—	—	—	—	—	—
28	Barry Nieckar†	LW	3	0	0	0	0	12	—	—	—	—	—	—
1	Andrei Trefilov	G	6	0	0	0		0	—	—	—	—	—	—

=== Goaltending ===
- † = Joined team via a transaction (e.g., trade, waivers, signing) during the season. Stats reflect time with the Flames only.

No.	Player	Regular season										Playoffs								
No.	Player	GP	W	L	T	SA	GA	GAA	SV%	SO	TOI	GP	W	L	SA	GA	GAA	SV%	SO	TOI
37	Trevor Kidd	43	22	14	6	1170	107	2.61	.909	3	2463	7	3	4	181	26	3.59	.856	1	434
31	Rick Tabaracci†	5	2	0	1	93	5	1.48	.946	0	202	1	0	0	9	0	0.00	1.000	0	19
36	Jason Muzzatti	1	0	0	0	8	0	0.00	1.000	0	10	—	—	—	—	—	—	—	—	—
1	Andrei Trefilov	6	0	3	0	130	16	4.07	.877	0	236	—	—	—	—	—	—	—	—	—

== Awards and records ==
=== Awards ===
Type	Award/honour	Recipient	Ref
League (annual)	King Clancy Memorial Trophy	Joe Nieuwendyk	
League (annual)	NHL First All-Star team	Theoren Fleury (Right Wing)	
Team	Molson Cup	Trevor Kidd	

=== Milestones ===
Milestone	Player	Date	Ref
First game	Jamie Allison	January 26, 1995	
First game	Cory Stillman	February 6, 1995	
First game	Scott Morrow	February 13, 1995	
First game	Joel Bouchard	February 13, 1995	
600th assist	Phil Housley	February 6, 1995	

== Transactions ==
The Flames were involved in the following transactions during the 1994–95 season.

=== Trades ===
June 29, 1994	To Calgary Flames Steve Chiasson	To Detroit Red Wings Mike Vernon
July 4, 1994	To Calgary Flames Phil Housley; 2nd round pick in 1996; 2nd round pick in 1997	To St. Louis Blues Al MacInnis

=== Free agents ===
Player / Former team	Player / New team

== Draft picks ==
Calgary's picks at the 1994 NHL entry draft, held in Hartford, Connecticut.

Rnd	Pick	Player	Nationality	Position	Team (league)	NHL statistics				
Rnd	Pick	Player	Nationality	Position	Team (league)	GP	G	A	Pts	PIM
1	19	Chris Dingman	Canada	LW	Brandon Wheat Kings (WHL)	385	15	19	34	769
2	45	Dmitri Riabykin	Russia	D	N/A					
3	77	Chris Clark	United States	RW	N/A	607	103	111	214	700
4	91	Ryan Duthie	Canada	C	Spokane Chiefs (WHL)					
4	97	Johan Finnstrom	Sweden	F	Rogle Angelholm (SEL)					
5	107	Nils Ekman	Sweden	RW	N/A	264	60	91	151	188
5	123	Frank Appel	Germany	D	Düsseldorfer EG (DEL)					
6	149	Patrik Haltia	Sweden	G	Färjestads BK (SEL)					
7	175	Ladislav Kohn	Czech Republic	RW	Swift Current Broncos (WHL)	186	14	28	42	125
8	201	Keith McCambridge	Canada	D	Swift Current Broncos (WHL)					
9	227	Jorgen Jonsson	Sweden	C	Rogle Angelholm (SEL)	81	12	19	31	16
10	253	Mike Peluso	United States	RW	Omaha Lancers (USHL)	38	4	2	6	19
11	279	Pavel Torgayev	Russia	C	TPS (SM-liiga)	55	6	14	20	20

== Farm teams ==
=== Saint John Flames ===
The 1994–95 American Hockey League season was the second for the Flames' top minor league affiliate. While the Saint John Flames managed only a 27–40–13 record, they still qualified for the playoffs. They fell in the first round to the Prince Edward Island Senators four games to one. Mark Greig led the Flames with 31 goals, while he and Cory Stillman tied for the team lead with 81 points. Dwayne Roloson was the starting goaltender, posting a 16–21–8 record with a 3.42 GAA in 46 games.

== See also ==
- 1994–95 NHL season
