= 1994–95 San Jose Sharks season =

National Hockey League team season

1994–95 San Jose Sharks
- Division: 3rd Pacific
- Conference: 7th Western
- 1994–95 record: 19–25–4
- Home record: 10–13–1
- Road record: 9–12–3
- Goals for: 129
- Goals against: 161

Team information
- General manager: Chuck Grillo; Dean Lombardi
- Coach: Kevin Constantine
- Captain: Bob Errey (Oct.–Feb.); Jeff Odgers (Feb.–May)
- Alternate captains: Ulf Dahlen; Igor Larionov; Jeff Odgers (Oct.–Feb.)
- Arena: San Jose Arena
- Average attendance: 17,190
- Minor league affiliates: Kansas City Blades; Roanoke Express

Team leaders
- Goals: Jeff Friesen (15)
- Assists: Ulf Dahlen (23)
- Points: Ulf Dahlen (34)
- Penalty minutes: Jeff Odgers (117)
- Plus/minus: Jayson More (+7)
- Wins: Arturs Irbe (14)
- Goals against average: Wade Flaherty (3.10)

In the 1994–95 San Jose Sharks season, the Sharks once again qualified for the playoffs and won their first-round series against the Calgary Flames before losing in the second round to the Detroit Red Wings.

== Offseason ==
The Sharks chose Jeff Friesen with their first-round pick, eleventh overall. Friesen would play for the Sharks for nearly seven seasons.

== Regular season ==
The Sharks started their lockout-shortened season by winning 5 of their first 6 games. In their first win of the season on January 21, 1995, 18-year-old rookie Jeff Friesen scored his very first National Hockey League goal, a short-handed game-winner against the Toronto Maple Leafs as the Sharks won 3-2. Their streak soon came to an end, and the team lost 5 straight from February 18 to 26. Although he had 4 shutouts, goaltender Arturs Irbe struggled, going 14-19-3 with a goals against average (GAA) of 3.26 and a save percentage (SV%) of .895. Friesen went on to lead the Sharks in goals with 15. During the season, the team acquired forwards Craig Janney and Kevin Miller in a trade with the St. Louis Blues for forward Todd Elik and defenseman Jeff Norton. Captain Bob Errey is traded to the Detroit Red Wings, and forward Jeff Odgers is named team captain.

The Sharks finished last in shots on goal (1,152) during the regular season.

=== Season standings ===
Pacific Division
No.	CR		GP	W	L	T	GF	GA	Pts
1	2	**Calgary Flames**	48	24	17	7	163	135	55
2	6	**Vancouver Canucks**	48	18	18	12	153	148	48
3	7	**San Jose Sharks**	48	19	25	4	129	161	42
4	9	Los Angeles Kings	48	16	23	9	142	174	41
5	11	Edmonton Oilers	48	17	27	4	136	183	38
6	12	Mighty Ducks of Anaheim	48	16	27	5	125	164	37

Note: No. = Division rank, CR = Conference rank, W = Wins, L = Losses, T = Ties, GF = Goals For, GA = Goals Against, Pts = Points
Teams that qualified for the playoffs are highlighted in bold.

Western Conference
R		Div	GP	W	L	T	GF	GA	Pts
**1**	**p – Detroit Red Wings**	**CEN**	**48**	**33**	**11**	**4**	**180**	**117**	**70**
**2**	**x – Calgary Flames**	**PAC**	**48**	**24**	**17**	**7**	**163**	**135**	**55**
**3**	**St. Louis Blues**	**CEN**	**48**	**28**	**15**	**5**	**178**	**135**	**61**
**4**	**Chicago Blackhawks**	**CEN**	**48**	**24**	**19**	**5**	**156**	**115**	**53**
**5**	**Toronto Maple Leafs**	**CEN**	**48**	**21**	**19**	**8**	**135**	**146**	**50**
**6**	**Vancouver Canucks**	**PAC**	**48**	**18**	**18**	**12**	**153**	**148**	**48**
**7**	**San Jose Sharks**	**PAC**	**48**	**19**	**25**	**4**	**129**	**161**	**42**
**8**	**Dallas Stars**	**CEN**	**48**	**17**	**23**	**8**	**136**	**135**	**42**
9	Los Angeles Kings	PAC	48	16	23	9	142	174	41
10	Winnipeg Jets	CEN	48	16	25	7	157	177	39
11	Edmonton Oilers	PAC	48	17	27	4	136	183	38
12	Mighty Ducks of Anaheim	PAC	48	16	27	5	125	164	37

Divisions: CEN – Central, PAC – Pacific

bold – Qualified for playoffs; x – Won division; p – Won Presidents' Trophy

== Playoffs ==
In the first round of playoffs, the Sharks once again upset the team with the better record, as they edged the Calgary Flames 4 games to 3. The Sharks allowed 5 shorthanded goals and gave up 35 total goals in the series. In the second round, the Sharks faced the Detroit Red Wings, whom they had defeated in 7 games in the first round of the 1994 Stanley Cup Playoffs. This time around, it was no contest, as Detroit blanked San Jose 6–0 in game 1, and won games 2, 3 and 4 by identical scores of 6–2. Detroit forward Vyacheslav Kozlov scored 4 goals and had 5 assists for 9 points in the 4 games. The Red Wings' special teams dominated the Sharks, scoring 7 power-play goals and adding two shorthanded goals. The Sharks were outscored 24–6 in the series, and were outshot 147–61.

== Schedule and results ==
=== Regular season ===
1994–95 regular season
January: 4–1–0 (home: 4–1–0; road: 0–0–0)

Game	Date	Score	Opponent	Record	Recap
1	January 20, 1995	2–5	St. Louis Blues (1994–95)	0–1–0	L
2	January 21, 1995	3–2	Toronto Maple Leafs (1994–95)	1–1–0	W
3	January 25, 1995	4–0	Winnipeg Jets (1994–95)	2–1–0	W
4	January 28, 1995	3–2	Dallas Stars (1994–95)	3–1–0	W
5	January 30, 1995	2–1	Chicago Blackhawks (1994–95)	4–1–0	W

February: 4–8–2 (home: 1–3–0; road: 3–5–2)

Game	Date	Score	Opponent	Record	Recap
6	February 2, 1995	2–1	@ Dallas Stars (1994–95)	5–1–0	W
7	February 4, 1995	3–3 OT	@ Winnipeg Jets (1994–95)	5–1–1	T
8	February 6, 1995	3–7	@ Toronto Maple Leafs (1994–95)	5–2–1	L
9	February 7, 1995	0–6	@ Detroit Red Wings (1994–95)	5–3–1	L
10	February 10, 1995	1–5	@ Edmonton Oilers (1994–95)	5–4–1	L
11	February 11, 1995	1–1 OT	@ Vancouver Canucks (1994–95)	5–4–2	T
12	February 15, 1995	3–1	Vancouver Canucks (1994–95)	6–4–2	W
13	February 17, 1995	2–0	@ Los Angeles Kings (1994–95)	7–4–2	W
14	February 18, 1995	3–6	Mighty Ducks of Anaheim (1994–95)	7–5–2	L
15	February 20, 1995	2–3	@ Chicago Blackhawks (1994–95)	7–6–2	L
16	February 22, 1995	3–4	@ St. Louis Blues (1994–95)	7–7–2	L
17	February 24, 1995	0–3	Calgary Flames (1994–95)	7–8–2	L
18	February 26, 1995	1–5	Vancouver Canucks (1994–95)	7–9–2	L
19	February 28, 1995	4–3	@ Vancouver Canucks (1994–95)	8–9–2	W

March: 4–8–0 (home: 1–5–0; road: 3–3–0)

Game	Date	Score	Opponent	Record	Recap
20	March 2, 1995	4–3	@ Toronto Maple Leafs (1994–95)	9–9–2	W
21	March 4, 1995	2–4	@ Winnipeg Jets (1994–95)	9–10–2	L
22	March 8, 1995	2–5	Edmonton Oilers (1994–95)	9–11–2	L
23	March 15, 1995	1–2	Toronto Maple Leafs (1994–95)	9–12–2	L
24	March 17, 1995	3–5	@ Edmonton Oilers (1994–95)	9–13–2	L
25	March 19, 1995	5–3	@ Calgary Flames (1994–95)	10–13–2	W
26	March 21, 1995	3–7	Chicago Blackhawks (1994–95)	10–14–2	L
27	March 23, 1995	3–6	Mighty Ducks of Anaheim (1994–95)	10–15–2	L
28	March 25, 1995	3–1	@ Los Angeles Kings (1994–95)	11–15–2	W
29	March 26, 1995	3–7	Los Angeles Kings (1994–95)	11–16–2	L
30	March 28, 1995	6–5 OT	Winnipeg Jets (1994–95)	12–16–2	W
31	March 31, 1995	1–4	@ St. Louis Blues (1994–95)	12–17–2	L

April: 6–8–1 (home: 3–4–0; road: 3–4–1)

Game	Date	Score	Opponent	Record	Recap
32	April 2, 1995	4–5	@ Mighty Ducks of Anaheim (1994–95)	12–18–2	L
33	April 5, 1995	3–5	Detroit Red Wings (1994–95)	12–19–2	L
34	April 7, 1995	5–0	Edmonton Oilers (1994–95)	13–19–2	W
35	April 9, 1995	5–2	@ Edmonton Oilers (1994–95)	14–19–2	W
36	April 10, 1995	3–8	@ Calgary Flames (1994–95)	14–20–2	L
37	April 12, 1995	3–2	@ Chicago Blackhawks (1994–95)	15–20–2	W
38	April 13, 1995	0–3	@ Detroit Red Wings (1994–95)	15–21–2	L
39	April 16, 1995	2–0	Los Angeles Kings (1994–95)	16–21–2	W
40	April 17, 1995	0–3	@ Mighty Ducks of Anaheim (1994–95)	16–22–2	L
41	April 19, 1995	5–5 OT	@ Dallas Stars (1994–95)	16–22–3	T
42	April 23, 1995	1–5	Detroit Red Wings (1994–95)	16–23–3	L
43	April 25, 1995	2–3	Calgary Flames (1994–95)	16–24–3	L
44	April 26, 1995	5–2	@ Mighty Ducks of Anaheim (1994–95)	17–24–3	W
45	April 28, 1995	4–0	Los Angeles Kings (1994–95)	18–24–3	W
46	April 30, 1995	3–4	St. Louis Blues (1994–95)	18–25–3	L

May: 1–0–1 (home: 1–0–1; road: 0–0–0)

Game	Date	Score	Opponent	Record	Recap
47	May 1, 1995	3–1	Dallas Stars (1994–95)	19–25–3	W
48	May 3, 1995	3–3 OT	Vancouver Canucks (1994–95)	19–25–4	T

Legend: W Win (2 points) L Loss (0 points) T Tie (1 point)

=== Playoffs ===
1995 Stanley Cup playoffs
Western Conference Quarterfinals vs. (2) Calgary Flames – Sharks win 4–3

Game	Date	Score	Opponent	Series	Recap
1	May 7, 1995	5–4	@ Calgary Flames	Sharks lead 1–0	W
2	May 9, 1995	5–4 OT	@ Calgary Flames	Sharks lead 2–0	W
3	May 11, 1995	2–9	Calgary Flames	Sharks lead 2–1	L
4	May 13, 1995	4–6	Calgary Flames	Series tied 2–2	L
5	May 15, 1995	0–5	@ Calgary Flames	Flames lead 3–2	L
6	May 17, 1995	5–3	Calgary Flames	Series tied 3–3	W
7	May 19, 1995	5–4 2OT	@ Calgary Flames	Sharks win 4–3	W

Western Conference Semifinals vs. (1) Detroit Red Wings – Red Wings win 4–0

Game	Date	Score	Opponent	Series	Recap
1	May 21, 1995	0–6	@ Detroit Red Wings	Red Wings lead 1–0	L
2	May 23, 1995	2–6	@ Detroit Red Wings	Red Wings lead 2–0	L
3	May 25, 1995	2–6	Detroit Red Wings	Red Wings lead 3–0	L
4	May 27, 1995	2–6	Detroit Red Wings	Red Wings win 4–0	L

Legend: W Win L Loss

== Player statistics ==
=== Scoring ===
- Position abbreviations: C = Center; D = Defense; G = Goaltender; LW = Left wing; RW = Right wing
- † = Joined team via a transaction (e.g., trade, waivers, signing) during the season. Stats reflect time with the Sharks only.
- ‡ = Left team via a transaction (e.g., trade, waivers, release) during the season. Stats reflect time with the Sharks only.

No.	Player	Pos	Regular season						Playoffs					
No.	Player	Pos	GP	G	A	Pts	+/-	PIM	GP	G	A	Pts	+/-	PIM
22	Ulf Dahlen	LW	46	11	23	34	−2	11	11	5	4	9	−13	0
39	Jeff Friesen	LW	48	15	10	25	−8	14	11	1	5	6	−9	4
14	Ray Whitney	LW	39	13	12	25	−7	14	11	4	4	8	−3	2
6	Sandis Ozolinsh	D	48	9	16	25	−6	30	11	3	2	5	−13	6
24	Sergei Makarov	RW	43	10	14	24	−4	40	11	3	3	6	−3	4
7	Igor Larionov	C	33	4	20	24	−3	14	11	1	8	9	−4	2
15	Craig Janney†	C	27	5	15	20	−4	10	11	3	4	7	−13	4
17	Pat Falloon	RW	46	12	7	19	−4	25	11	3	1	4	−6	0
27	Todd Elik‡	C	22	7	10	17	3	18	—	—	—	—	—	—
41	Tom Pederson	D	47	5	11	16	−14	31	10	0	5	5	−14	8
18	Chris Tancill	C	26	3	11	14	1	10	11	1	1	2	−7	8
8 (Note: Miller wore number 12 in his first two games.)	Kevin Miller†	C	21	6	7	13	0	13	6	0	0	0	−3	2
13	Jamie Baker	C	43	7	4	11	−7	22	11	2	2	4	−7	12
8	Jeff Norton‡	D	20	1	9	10	1	39	—	—	—	—	—	—
11	Gaetan Duchesne‡	LW	33	2	7	9	−6	16	—	—	—	—	—	—
40	Mike Rathje	D	42	2	7	9	−1	29	11	5	2	7	−15	4
23	Andrei Nazarov	LW	26	3	5	8	−1	94	6	0	0	0	0	9
36	Jeff Odgers	RW	48	4	3	7	−8	117	11	1	1	2	0	23
2	Jim Kyte†	D	18	2	5	7	−7	33	11	0	2	2	−1	14
4	Jay More	D	45	0	6	6	7	71	11	0	4	4	0	6
3	Ilja Byakin	D	13	0	5	5	−9	14	—	—	—	—	—	—
12	Bob Errey‡	LW	13	2	2	4	4	27	—	—	—	—	—	—
38	Michal Sykora	D	16	0	4	4	6	10	—	—	—	—	—	—
9	Vyacheslav Butsayev	C	6	2	0	2	−2	0	—	—	—	—	—	—
47	Viktor Kozlov	C	16	2	0	2	−5	2	—	—	—	—	—	—
10	Johan Garpenlov‡	LW	13	1	1	2	−3	2	—	—	—	—	—	—
16	Dody Wood	C	9	1	1	2	0	29	—	—	—	—	—	—
44	Shawn Cronin	D	29	0	2	2	0	61	9	0	0	0	2	5
26	Vlastimil Kroupa	D	14	0	2	2	−7	16	6	0	0	0	−3	4
31	Wade Flaherty	G	18	0	1	1		0	7	0	0	0		0
42	Shean Donovan	RW	14	0	0	0	−6	6	7	0	1	1	−3	6
32	Arturs Irbe	G	38	0	0	0		4	6	0	0	0		10

=== Goaltending ===
No.	Player	Regular season										Playoffs								
No.	Player	GP	W	L	T	SA	GA	GAA	SV%	SO	TOI	GP	W	L	SA	GA	GAA	SV%	SO	TOI
32	Arturs Irbe	38	14	19	3	1056	111	3.26	.895	4	2043	6	2	4	184	27	5.13	.853	0	316
31	Wade Flaherty	18	5	6	1	455	44	3.10	.903	1	852	7	2	3	221	31	4.93	.860	0	377

== Awards and records ==
=== Awards ===
Type	Award/honor	Recipient	Ref
League (annual)	Lester Patrick Trophy	Brian Mullen	
League (annual)	NHL All-Rookie Team	Jeff Friesen (Forward)	
Team	Sharks Player of the Year	Ulf Dahlen	
Team	Sharks Rookie of the Year	Jeff Friesen	

=== Milestones ===
Milestone	Player	Date	Ref
First game	Jeff Friesen	January 20, 1995	
First game	Shean Donovan	February 6, 1995	
First game	Viktor Kozlov	February 18, 1995	
1,000th game played	Gaetan Duchesne	February 26, 1995	

== Transactions ==
=== Trade Deadline Transactions ===
Traded	Acquired	Acquired From
Gaetan Duchesne	1995 6th round draft pick (FLA)	Florida Panthers

== Draft picks ==
San Jose's draft picks at the 1994 NHL entry draft held at the Hartford Civic Center in Hartford, Connecticut.

Round	#	Player	Position	Nationality	College/Junior/Club team
1	11	Jeff Friesen	Left wing	Canada	Regina Pats (WHL)
2	37	Angel Nikolov	Defense	Czech Republic	Litvinov CHP HC (Czech)
3	66	Alexei Yegorov	Right wing	Russia	St. Petersburg SKA (Russia)
4	89	Vaclav Varada	Left wing	Czech Republic	Vitkovice HC (Czech)
5	115	Brian Swanson	Center	United States	Omaha Lancers (USHL)
6	141	Alexander Korolyuk	Right wing	Russia	Krylja Sovetov (Russia)
7	167	Sergei Gorbachev	Forward	Russia	HC Dynamo Moscow (Russia)
8	193	Eric Landry	Right wing	Canada	Guelph Storm (OHL)
9	219	Evgeni Nabokov	Goalie	Kazakhstan	Kamenogorsk (Russia)
10	240	Tomas Pisa	Left wing	Czech Republic	Pardubice HC (Czech)
10	245	Aniket Dhadphale	Left wing	United States	Notre Dame (NCAA)
11	271	David Beauregard	Left wing	Canada	St. Hyacinthe Lasers (QMJHL)
