= 1994–95 St. Louis Blues season =

National Hockey League team season

1994–95 St. Louis Blues
- Division: 2nd Central
- Conference: 3rd Western
- 1994–95 record: 28–15–5
- Home record: 16–6–2
- Road record: 12–9–3
- Goals for: 178
- Goals against: 135

Team information
- General manager: Mike Keenan
- Coach: Mike Keenan
- Captain: Brett Hull
- Arena: Kiel Center
- Average attendance: 19,469
- Minor league affiliates: Peoria Rivermen; Dayton Bombers

Team leaders
- Goals: Brett Hull (29)
- Assists: Steve Duchesne (26)
- Points: Brett Hull (50)
- Penalty minutes: Brendan Shanahan (136)
- Plus/minus: Steve Duchesne (+29)
- Wins: Curtis Joseph (20)
- Goals against average: Jon Casey (2.75)

The 1994–95 St. Louis Blues season was the 28th in franchise history. The season started with good fortunes for the Blues, as Mike Keenan, who had coached the 1993–94 New York Rangers to the Stanley Cup, signed with the team in the off-season. The Blues also acquired four players from the Cup-winning Rangers: Glenn Anderson, Greg Gilbert, Doug Lidster and Esa Tikkanen. On April 16, 1995, captain Brett Hull had his first-ever four-goal game in a 6–5 win over the Detroit Red Wings.

The Blues played strong all season and finished third in the Conference. They powered their way to fourth place in scoring in the league with 178 goals.

== Off-season ==
The Blues moved from their home in the arena where they had played since their inception to the newly built Kiel Center. The inaugural game was set to be played against their rivals, the Chicago Blackhawks, but the NHL lockout kept this game from being played. The first official game wasn't played until January 1995. The regular season was shortened to 48 games.

== Regular season ==
The Blues scored 135 even-strength goals during the regular season, the most among all 26 NHL teams and tied the Washington Capitals for the fewest short-handed goals allowed (2).

=== Final standings ===
Central Division
No.	CR		GP	W	L	T	GF	GA	Pts
1	1	**Detroit Red Wings**	48	33	11	4	180	117	70
2	2	**St. Louis Blues**	48	28	15	5	178	135	61
3	4	**Chicago Blackhawks**	48	24	19	5	156	115	53
4	5	**Toronto Maple Leafs**	48	21	19	8	135	146	50
5	8	**Dallas Stars**	48	17	23	8	136	135	42
6	10	Winnipeg Jets	48	16	25	7	157	177	39

Note: No. = Division rank, CR = Conference rank, W = Wins, L = Losses, T = Ties, GF = Goals For, GA = Goals Against, Pts = Points
Teams that qualified for the playoffs are highlighted in bold.

Western Conference
R		Div	GP	W	L	T	GF	GA	Pts
**1**	**p – Detroit Red Wings**	**CEN**	**48**	**33**	**11**	**4**	**180**	**117**	**70**
**2**	**x – Calgary Flames**	**PAC**	**48**	**24**	**17**	**7**	**163**	**135**	**55**
**3**	**St. Louis Blues**	**CEN**	**48**	**28**	**15**	**5**	**178**	**135**	**61**
**4**	**Chicago Blackhawks**	**CEN**	**48**	**24**	**19**	**5**	**156**	**115**	**53**
**5**	**Toronto Maple Leafs**	**CEN**	**48**	**21**	**19**	**8**	**135**	**146**	**50**
**6**	**Vancouver Canucks**	**PAC**	**48**	**18**	**18**	**12**	**153**	**148**	**48**
**7**	**San Jose Sharks**	**PAC**	**48**	**19**	**25**	**4**	**129**	**161**	**42**
**8**	**Dallas Stars**	**CEN**	**48**	**17**	**23**	**8**	**136**	**135**	**42**
9	Los Angeles Kings	PAC	48	16	23	9	142	174	41
10	Winnipeg Jets	CEN	48	16	25	7	157	177	39
11	Edmonton Oilers	PAC	48	17	27	4	136	183	38
12	Mighty Ducks of Anaheim	PAC	48	16	27	5	125	164	37

Divisions: CEN – Central, PAC – Pacific

bold – Qualified for playoffs; x – Won division; p – Won Presidents' Trophy

== Playoffs ==
With all its firepower and playoff experience, St. Louis was heavily favored to beat 6th place Vancouver in the first round of the 1995 NHL playoffs. However, after winning game 1, the Blues dropped the next two games and never regained the series lead. After a tough overtime loss in game 5, the Blues fought back in game 6 with an explosive 8–2 victory at the Pacific Coliseum in Vancouver to tie the series at 3–3. In game 7 at the Kiel Center, the Blues outshot the Canucks 44–22, but Vancouver goaltender Kirk McLean was solid in net, making 41 saves; St. Louis goaltender Curtis Joseph struggled, allowing 4 goals on only 21 shots. Pavel Bure added an empty-net goal with 22 seconds remaining in the third period to give the Canucks a 5–3 win and the series 4 games to 3.

== Schedule and results ==
=== Regular season ===
1994–95 regular season
January: 4–2–0 (home: 2–1–0; road: 2–1–0)

Game	Date	Score	Opponent	Record	Recap
1	January 20, 1995	5–2	@ San Jose Sharks (1994–95)	1–0–0	W
2	January 21, 1995	7–1	@ Vancouver Canucks (1994–95)	2–0–0	W
3	January 24, 1995	4–6	@ Calgary Flames (1994–95)	2–1–0	L
4	January 26, 1995	3–1	Los Angeles Kings (1994–95)	3–1–0	W
5	January 28, 1995	1–3	Vancouver Canucks (1994–95)	3–2–0	L
6	January 31, 1995	7–2	Mighty Ducks of Anaheim (1994–95)	4–2–0	W

February: 8–3–1 (home: 5–2–1; road: 3–1–0)

Game	Date	Score	Opponent	Record	Recap
7	February 2, 1995	5–4 OT	@ Winnipeg Jets (1994–95)	5–2–0	W
8	February 4, 1995	7–4	Dallas Stars (1994–95)	6–2–0	W
9	February 7, 1995	5–5 OT	Los Angeles Kings (1994–95)	6–2–1	T
10	February 9, 1995	0–5	Chicago Blackhawks (1994–95)	6–3–1	L
11	February 11, 1995	2–3	Winnipeg Jets (1994–95)	6–4–1	L
12	February 13, 1995	4–2	Calgary Flames (1994–95)	7–4–1	W
13	February 17, 1995	4–3	@ Winnipeg Jets (1994–95)	8–4–1	W
14	February 18, 1995	1–3	@ Toronto Maple Leafs (1994–95)	8–5–1	L
15	February 20, 1995	4–0	Edmonton Oilers (1994–95)	9–5–1	W
16	February 22, 1995	4–3	San Jose Sharks (1994–95)	10–5–1	W
17	February 25, 1995	3–2	@ Detroit Red Wings (1994–95)	11–5–1	W
18	February 27, 1995	3–2	Toronto Maple Leafs (1994–95)	12–5–1	W

March: 7–5–1 (home: 4–1–0; road: 3–4–1)

Game	Date	Score	Opponent	Record	Recap
19	March 5, 1995	1–2	@ Dallas Stars (1994–95)	12–6–1	L
20	March 7, 1995	6–3	Mighty Ducks of Anaheim (1994–95)	13–6–1	W
21	March 9, 1995	5–1	Calgary Flames (1994–95)	14–6–1	W
22	March 12, 1995	1–2	Detroit Red Wings (1994–95)	14–7–1	L
23	March 14, 1995	5–6	@ Edmonton Oilers (1994–95)	14–8–1	L
24	March 16, 1995	2–2 OT	@ Los Angeles Kings (1994–95)	14–8–2	T
25	March 19, 1995	4–2	@ Mighty Ducks of Anaheim (1994–95)	15–8–2	W
26	March 20, 1995	3–5	@ Los Angeles Kings (1994–95)	15–9–2	L
27	March 22, 1995	3–4	@ Calgary Flames (1994–95)	15–10–2	L
28	March 26, 1995	5–1	Edmonton Oilers (1994–95)	16–10–2	W
29	March 27, 1995	3–2	@ Dallas Stars (1994–95)	17–10–2	W
30	March 29, 1995	3–1	@ Chicago Blackhawks (1994–95)	18–10–2	W
31	March 31, 1995	4–1	San Jose Sharks (1994–95)	19–10–2	W

April: 8–4–3 (home: 5–1–1; road: 3–3–2)

Game	Date	Score	Opponent	Record	Recap
32	April 2, 1995	3–3 OT	@ Detroit Red Wings (1994–95)	19–10–3	T
33	April 3, 1995	5–2	Toronto Maple Leafs (1994–95)	20–10–3	W
34	April 5, 1995	6–4	@ Toronto Maple Leafs (1994–95)	21–10–3	W
35	April 9, 1995	2–3	Dallas Stars (1994–95)	21–11–3	L
36	April 11, 1995	7–5	Winnipeg Jets (1994–95)	22–11–3	W
37	April 13, 1995	2–5	@ Winnipeg Jets (1994–95)	22–12–3	L
38	April 16, 1995	6–5	Detroit Red Wings (1994–95)	23–12–3	W
39	April 18, 1995	4–1	Vancouver Canucks (1994–95)	24–12–3	W
40	April 19, 1995	2–2 OT	@ Chicago Blackhawks (1994–95)	24–12–4	T
41	April 21, 1995	3–1	Toronto Maple Leafs (1994–95)	25–12–4	W
42	April 23, 1995	2–2 OT	Chicago Blackhawks (1994–95)	25–12–5	T
43	April 25, 1995	8–4	@ Dallas Stars (1994–95)	26–12–5	W
44	April 27, 1995	2–3 OT	@ Edmonton Oilers (1994–95)	26–13–5	L
45	April 28, 1995	1–3	@ Vancouver Canucks (1994–95)	26–14–5	L
46	April 30, 1995	4–3	@ San Jose Sharks (1994–95)	27–14–5	W

May: 1–1–0 (home: 0–1–0; road: 1–0–0)

Game	Date	Score	Opponent	Record	Recap
47	May 1, 1995	5–3	@ Mighty Ducks of Anaheim (1994–95)	28–14–5	W
48	May 3, 1995	2–3	Detroit Red Wings (1994–95)	28–15–5	L

Legend: W Win (2 points) L Loss (0 points) T Tie (1 point)

=== Playoffs ===
1995 Stanley Cup playoffs
Western Conference Quarterfinals vs. (6) Vancouver Canucks – Canucks win 4–3

Game	Date	Score	Opponent	Series	Recap
1	May 7, 1995	2–1	Vancouver Canucks	Blues lead 1–0	W
2	May 9, 1995	3–5	Vancouver Canucks	Series tied 1–1	L
3	May 11, 1995	1–6	@ Vancouver Canucks	Canucks lead 2–1	L
4	May 13, 1995	5–2	@ Vancouver Canucks	Series tied 2–2	W
5	May 15, 1995	5–6 OT	Vancouver Canucks	Canucks lead 3–2	L
6	May 17, 1995	8–2	@ Vancouver Canucks	Series tied 3–3	W
7	May 19, 1995	3–5	Vancouver Canucks	Canucks win 4–3	L

Legend: W Win L Loss

== Player statistics ==
=== Scoring ===
- Position abbreviations: C = Center; D = Defense; G = Goaltender; LW = Left wing; RW = Right wing
- † = Joined team via a transaction (e.g., trade, waivers, signing) during the season. Stats reflect time with the Blues only.
- ‡ = Left team via a transaction (e.g., trade, waivers, release) during the season. Stats reflect time with the Blues only.

No.	Player	Pos	Regular season						Playoffs					
No.	Player	Pos	GP	G	A	Pts	+/-	PIM	GP	G	A	Pts	+/-	PIM
16	Brett Hull	RW	48	29	21	50	13	10	7	6	2	8	0	0
19	Brendan Shanahan	LW	45	20	21	41	7	136	5	4	5	9	2	14
28	Steve Duchesne	D	47	12	26	38	29	36	7	0	4	4	0	2
10	Esa Tikkanen	LW	43	12	23	35	13	22	7	2	2	4	−1	20
20	Adam Creighton	C	48	14	20	34	17	74	7	2	0	2	−1	16
2	Al MacInnis	D	32	8	20	28	19	43	7	1	5	6	−3	10
22	Ian Laperriere	RW	37	13	14	27	12	85	7	0	4	4	3	21
9 (Note: Anderson wore number 36 through March 29.)	Glenn Anderson†	RW	36	12	14	26	9	37	6	1	1	2	0	49
7	Greg Gilbert	LW	46	11	14	25	22	11	7	0	3	3	0	6
5	Jeff Norton†	D	28	2	18	20	21	33	7	1	1	2	1	11
33	Bill Houlder	D	41	5	13	18	16	20	4	1	1	2	6	0
27	Denis Chasse	RW	47	7	9	16	12	133	7	1	7	8	7	23
21	Guy Carbonneau	C	42	5	11	16	11	16	7	1	2	3	3	6
25 (Note: Tardif wore number 40 through March 22.)	Patrice Tardif	C	27	3	10	13	4	29	—	—	—	—	—	—
15 (Note: Roberts wore number 12 in his first two games and number 37 in his next three games.)	David Roberts	LW	19	6	5	11	2	10	6	0	0	0	−5	4
12	Vitali Karamnov	LW	26	3	7	10	7	14	2	0	0	0	0	2
6	Doug Lidster	D	37	2	7	9	9	12	4	0	0	0	6	2
15	Craig Janney‡	C	8	2	5	7	3	0	—	—	—	—	—	—
14	Kevin Miller‡	C	15	2	5	7	4	0	—	—	—	—	—	—
23	Craig Johnson	LW	15	3	3	6	4	6	1	0	0	0	0	2
14	Todd Elik†	C	13	2	4	6	5	4	7	4	3	7	1	2
4	Rick Zombo	D	23	1	4	5	7	24	3	0	0	0	−1	2
34	Murray Baron	D	39	0	5	5	9	93	7	1	1	2	2	2
17	Basil McRae	LW	21	0	5	5	4	72	7	2	1	3	4	4
18	Tony Twist	LW	28	3	0	3	0	89	1	0	0	0	0	6
32	Donald Dufresne	D	22	0	3	3	2	10	3	0	0	0	−1	4
26	Peter Stastny	C	6	1	1	2	1	0	—	—	—	—	—	—
31	Curtis Joseph	G	36	0	1	1		0	7	0	1	1		0
29	Geoff Sarjeant	G	4	0	1	1		2	—	—	—	—	—	—
37 (Note: Batters wore number 5 in his first six games.)	Jeff Batters	D	10	0	0	0	−5	21	—	—	—	—	—	—
36	Philippe Bozon	LW	1	0	0	0	0	0	—	—	—	—	—	—
30	Jon Casey	G	19	0	0	0		0	2	0	0	0		0
9	Denny Felsner	LW	3	0	0	0	−1	2	—	—	—	—	—	—
44	Terry Hollinger	D	5	0	0	0	−1	2	—	—	—	—	—	—
41	Daniel Laperriere‡	D	4	0	0	0	1	15	—	—	—	—	—	—
25	Vitali Prokhorov	LW	2	0	0	0	1	0	—	—	—	—	—	—

=== Goaltending ===
No.	Player	Regular season										Playoffs								
No.	Player	GP	W	L	T	SA	GA	GAA	SV%	SO	TOI	GP	W	L	SA	GA	GAA	SV%	SO	TOI
31	Curtis Joseph	36	20	10	1	904	89	2.79	.902	1	1914	7	3	3	178	24	3.68	.865	0	392
30	Jon Casey	19	7	5	4	400	40	2.75	.900	0	872	2	0	1	10	2	4.02	.800	0	30
29	Geoff Sarjeant	4	1	0	0	52	6	3.00	.885	0	120	—	—	—	—	—	—	—	—	—

== Awards and records ==
=== Awards ===
Type	Award/honor	Recipient	Ref
League (annual)	Lester Patrick Trophy	Joe Mullen	

=== Milestones ===
Milestone	Player	Date	Ref
First game	Craig Johnson	January 21, 1995	
First game	Patrice Tardif	January 21, 1995	
First game	Geoff Sarjeant	January 28, 1995	

== Transactions ==
- July 24, 1994 – Doug Lidster was traded by the New York Rangers, along with Esa Tikkanen, to the St. Louis Blues in exchange for Petr Nedved.

== Draft picks ==
St. Louis's draft picks at the 1994 NHL entry draft held at the Hartford Civic Center in Hartford, Connecticut.

Round	#	Player	Nationality	College/Junior/Club team (League)
3	68	Stephane Roy	Canada	Val-d'Or Foreurs (QMJHL)
4	94	Tyler Harlton	Canada	Vernon Lakers (BCHL)
5	120	Edvin Frylen	Sweden	VIK Västerås HK (Sweden)
7	172	Roman Vopat	Czech Republic	Chemopetrol Litvínov (Czech Republic)
8	198	Steve Noble	Canada	Stratford Cullitons (MOJHL)
9	224	Marc Stephan	Canada	Tri-City Americans (WHL)
10	250	Kevin Harper	Canada	Wexford Raiders (OJHL)
11	276	Scott Fankhouser	United States	University of Massachusetts (Hockey East)
