= Tavis Hansen =

Canadian ice hockey player (born 1975)

- Born: June 17, 1975 (age 50) Prince Albert, Saskatchewan, Canada
- Height: 6 ft 2.5 in (189 cm)
- Weight: 220 lb (100 kg; 15 st 10 lb)
- Position: Right Wing
- Shot: Right
- Played for: Winnipeg Jets; Phoenix Coyotes
- NHL draft: 58th overall, 1994; Winnipeg Jets
- Playing career: 1995–2007

Tavis Svend Hansen (born June 17, 1975) is a Canadian former professional ice hockey player.

== Career ==
Hansen played two seasons (1993–1994 and 1994–1995) of junior hockey for the Tacoma Rockets of the Western Hockey League.

He was drafted in the 3rd round, 58th overall by the Winnipeg Jets in the 1994 NHL entry draft. Hansen made his NHL debut with the Jets after his second and final season in Tacoma. His NHL rights were transferred to Phoenix Coyotes when the franchise relocated in 1996 and he made his first appearance as a 'Yote in the 1996–1997 season. Hansen was, however, quickly returned to Springfield before being called up again in 1998–1999. He scored his first NHL goal, versus Calgary, in February 1999, during what would be a 20-game stint with the Coyotes that season. He also made his first NHL playoff appearance in 1998.

In 1999–2000, Hansen was named captain of the Springfield Falcons and recorded career highs for points (48) and penalty minutes (164) while still managing to lend his skills to the Coyotes for five games. He returned in 2000–01 for seven games in Phoenix, playing 24 for the Falcons, alongside Danny Briere.

Hansen missed a majority of the 2000–2001 and 2001–2002 seasons recovering from a shoulder injury suffered in a game vs. the Hershey Bears (AHL) on February 3, 2001. Ironically, Hershey later signed him as a free agent and he helped the Bears make a run at playoffs to finish off the 2001–2002 season. He was signed as a free agent by San Jose Sharks on September 5, 2002, and played the next two seasons as captain for the Cleveland Barons (the Sharks' AHL affiliate).

During the 2004–2005 NHL lockout, Hansen made his first move overseas to play for Oji in the Asia League Ice Hockey. He played the next two years for HC TWK Innsbruck (Erste Bank Eishockey Liga-Austria), and captained the Tirolean team his second season.

Tavis Hansen retired from professional hockey in April 2007. He resides in Seattle, Washington, with his family.

== Career statistics ==
			Regular season					Playoffs
Season	Team	League	GP	G	A	Pts	PIM	GP	G	A	Pts	PIM
1993–94	Tacoma Rockets	WHL	71	23	31	54	122	8	1	3	4	17
1994–95	Tacoma Rockets	WHL	71	32	41	73	142	4	1	1	2	8
1994–95	Winnipeg Jets	NHL	1	0	0	0	0	—	—	—	—	—
1995–96	Springfield Falcons	AHL	67	6	16	22	85	5	1	2	3	2
1996–97	Springfield Falcons	AHL	12	3	1	4	23	—	—	—	—	—
1996–97	Phoenix Coyotes	NHL	1	0	0	0	0	—	—	—	—	—
1997–98	Springfield Falcons	AHL	73	20	14	34	70	4	1	2	3	18
1998–99	Springfield Falcons	AHL	63	23	11	34	85	3	0	1	1	5
1998–99	Phoenix Coyotes	NHL	20	2	1	3	12	2	0	0	0	0
1999–00	Springfield Falcons	AHL	59	21	27	48	164	5	2	1	3	4
1999–00	Phoenix Coyotes	NHL	5	0	0	0	0	—	—	—	—	—
2000–01	Springfield Falcons	AHL	24	6	10	16	81	—	—	—	—	—
2000–01	Phoenix Coyotes	NHL	7	0	0	0	4	—	—	—	—	—
2001–02	Hershey Bears	AHL	35	9	6	15	50	8	0	3	3	8
2002–03	Cleveland Barons	AHL	80	23	21	44	81	—	—	—	—	—
2003–04	Cleveland Barons	AHL	77	17	17	34	118	9	5	2	7	13
2004–05	Oji Eagles	Asia League	39	21	18	39	134	4	1	1	2	14
2005–06	HC Innsbruck	EBEL	41	12	14	26	116	7	1	4	5	14
2006–07	HC Innsbruck	EBEL	55	16	14	30	225	—	—	—	—	—
NHL totals			34	2	1	3	16	2	0	0	0	0
AHL totals			490	128	123	251	757	34	9	11	20	50
