= Mark Lawrence (ice hockey) =

Canadian ice hockey player

- Born: January 27, 1972 (age 54) Burlington, Ontario, Canada
- Height: 6 ft 4 in (193 cm)
- Weight: 210 lb (95 kg; 15 st 0 lb)
- Position: Right wing
- Shot: Right
- Played for: Dallas Stars; New York Islanders
- NHL draft: 118th overall, 1991; Minnesota North Stars
- Playing career: 1992–2003

Mark Jay Lawrence (born January 27, 1972) is a Canadian former professional ice hockey winger who played in the National Hockey League for the Dallas Stars and the New York Islanders from 1995 to 2000.

== Early life ==
Lawrence was born in Burlington, Ontario. As a youth, he played in the 1985 Quebec International Pee-Wee Hockey Tournament with a minor ice hockey team from Burlington.

== Career ==
Lawrence was drafted 118th overall by the Minnesota North Stars in the 1991 NHL entry draft. He had a spell in the East Coast Hockey League with the Dayton Bombers and three seasons in the International Hockey League (IHL) with the Kalamazoo Wings.

He made his NHL debut with the Dallas Stars, playing two games during the 1994–95 NHL season. He played 13 more games for the Stars the next season before moving to the New York Islanders in 1997 as a free agent. He received more ice time with the Islanders with his best season coming in 1998–99, scoring 14 goals and 16 assists for 30 points in 60 games. In all, Lawrence played 142 regular season games, scoring 18 goals and 26 assists for 44 points and collected 115 penalty minutes.

In 2001, he returned to the Kalamazoo Wings who were now in the United Hockey League. He joined as a player/assistant coach, but missed a majority of the 2001–02 season due to a knee injury. In February 2002, he became interim head coach of the Wings for the remainder of the 2001–02 season, replacing Dennis Desrosiers, but only won 5 of 22 games as the Wings failed to make the playoffs. He played one more season with the Wings before retiring.

In 2015, he was hired as the head coach of the West Michigan Wolves, a Tier III junior team in the North American 3 Hockey League, after six seasons as a youth coach in West Michigan.

== Career statistics ==
=== Regular season and playoffs ===
			Regular season					Playoffs
Season	Team	League	GP	G	A	Pts	PIM	GP	G	A	Pts	PIM
1987–88	Burlington Cougars	COJHL	40	12	12	24	90	—	—	—	—	—
1988–89	Niagara Falls Thunder	OHL	63	9	27	36	142	—	—	—	—	—
1989–90	Niagara Falls Thunder	OHL	54	15	18	33	123	16	2	5	7	42
1990–91	Detroit Compuware Ambassadors	OHL	66	27	38	65	53	—	—	—	—	—
1991–92	Detroit Compuware Ambassadors	OHL	28	19	26	45	54	—	—	—	—	—
1991–92	North Bay Centennials	OHL	24	13	14	27	21	21	23	12	35	36
1992–93	Kalamazoo Wings	IHL	57	22	13	35	47	—	—	—	—	—
1992–93	Dayton Bombers	ECHL	20	8	14	22	46	—	—	—	—	—
1993–94	Kalamazoo Wings	IHL	64	17	20	37	90	—	—	—	—	—
1994–95	Dallas Stars	NHL	2	0	0	0	0	—	—	—	—	—
1994–95	Kalamazoo Wings	IHL	77	21	29	50	92	16	3	7	10	28
1995–96	Dallas Stars	NHL	13	0	1	1	17	—	—	—	—	—
1995–96	Michigan K-Wings	IHL	55	15	14	29	92	10	3	4	7	30
1996–97	Michigan K-Wings	IHL	68	15	21	36	141	4	0	0	0	18
1997–98	New York Islanders	NHL	2	0	0	0	2	—	—	—	—	—
1997–98	Utah Grizzlies	IHL	80	36	28	64	102	4	1	1	2	4
1998–99	New York Islanders	NHL	60	14	16	30	38	—	—	—	—	—
1998–99	Lowell Lock Monsters	AHL	21	10	6	16	28	—	—	—	—	—
1999–00	New York Islanders	NHL	29	1	5	6	26	—	—	—	—	—
1999–00	Chicago Wolves	IHL	16	4	6	10	32	—	—	—	—	—
1999–00	Lowell Lock Monsters	AHL	18	4	4	8	8	7	2	2	4	10
2000–01	New York Islanders	NHL	36	3	4	7	32	—	—	—	—	—
2000–01	Chicago Wolves	IHL	32	8	6	14	26	2	0	0	0	0
2001–02	Kalamazoo Wings	UHL	38	15	19	34	41	—	—	—	—	—
2002–03	Kalamazoo Wings	UHL	69	10	41	51	89	—	—	—	—	—
IHL totals			449	138	137	275	622	36	7	12	19	80
NHL totals			142	18	26	44	115	—	—	—	—	—
