= 1989–90 NHL transactions =

This list is for 1989–90 NHL transactions within professional ice hockey league of players in North America. The following contains team-to-team transactions that occurred in the National Hockey League during the 1989–90 NHL season. It lists what team each player has been traded to, or claimed by, and for which players or draft picks, if applicable.

== June ==
June 1, 1989	To Buffalo Sabres Scott McCrory	To Washington Capitals Mark Ferner
June 15, 1989	To St. Louis Blues Paul MacLean; Adam Oates	To Detroit Red Wings Bernie Federko; Tony McKegney
June 16, 1989	To Toronto Maple Leafs Rob Ramage	To Calgary Flames 2nd-rd pick - 1989 entry draft (# 24 - Kent Manderville)
June 17, 1989	To New Jersey Devils Sylvain Turgeon	To Hartford Whalers Pat Verbeek
June 17, 1989	To New Jersey Devils 3rd-rd pick - 1990 entry draft (# 56 - Brad Bombardir)	To Winnipeg Jets 3rd-rd pick - 1989 entry draft (# 46 - Jason Cirone)
June 17, 1989	To Buffalo Sabres 6th-rd pick - 1989 entry draft (# 107 - Bill Pye)	To New York Islanders Joe Reekie
June 17, 1989	To Winnipeg Jets Randy Cunneyworth; Dave McLlwain; Rick Tabaracci	To Pittsburgh Penguins Randy Gilhen; Jim Kyte; Andrew McBain
June 17, 1989	To Boston Bruins 3rd-rd pick - 1989 entry draft (# 57 - Wes Walz)	To Edmonton Oilers Tommy Lehmann
June 17, 1989	To New Jersey Devils 1st-rd pick - 1989 entry draft (# 18 - Jason Miller)	To Edmonton Oilers Corey Foster
June 17, 1989	To Quebec Nordiques future considerations	To Washington Capitals Bob Mason
June 17, 1989	To New Jersey Devils Walt Poddubny; 4th-rd pick - 1990 entry draft (# 64 - Mike Bodnarchuk)	To Quebec Nordiques Joe Cirella; Claude Loiselle; 8th-rd pick - 1990 entry draft (# 158 - Alexander Karpovtsev)
June 17, 1989	To Los Angeles Kings 5th-rd pick - 1989 entry draft (# 103 - Tom Newman)	To Washington Capitals Alan May
June 17, 1989	To St. Louis Blues 3rd-rd pick - 1989 entry draft (# 55 - Denny Felsner); 2nd-rd pick - 1991 entry draft (# 27 - Steve Staios)	To Winnipeg Jets Greg Paslawski; 3rd-rd pick - 1989 entry draft (# 62 - Kris Draper)
June 17, 1989	To Boston Bruins Frank Caprice	To Vancouver Canucks 12th-rd pick - 1989 entry draft (# 248 - Jan Bergman)
June 19, 1989	To Minnesota North Stars Gaetan Duchesne	To Quebec Nordiques Kevin Kaminski
June 19, 1989	To New Jersey Devils Peter Sundstrom	To Washington Capitals 10th-rd pick - 1991 entry draft (# 209 - Rob Leask)
June 29, 1989	To Toronto Maple Leafs Lou Franceschetti	To Washington Capitals 5th-rd pick - 1990 entry draft (# 94 - Mark Ouimet)

== July ==
July 21, 1989	To Winnipeg Jets Shawn Cronin	To Philadelphia Flyers future considerations^{1}

1. The future considerations were cancelled in subsequent trade on October 3, 1989, involving Pete Peeters and Keith Acton.

== August ==
August 28, 1989	To Toronto Maple Leafs 7th-rd pick - 1991 entry draft (PHI - # 138 - Andrei Lomakin)^{1}	To Philadelphia Flyers rights to Jiri Latal

1. Philadelphia's seventh-round pick was re-acquired as the result of a trade on September 8, 1989, that sent Mark Laforest to Toronto in exchange for Toronto's sixth-round pick in the 1991 entry draft (later upgraded to a fifth- round) and this pick.

== September ==
September 1, 1989	To Los Angeles Kings Barry Beck	To New York Rangers 4th-rd pick - 1990 entry draft (# 69 - Jeff Nielsen)
September 5, 1989	To Minnesota North Stars Peter Lappin	To Calgary Flames 2nd-rd pick - 1990 entry draft (NJD - # 29 - Chris Gotziaman)^{1}
September 7, 1989	To Detroit Red Wings Chris McRae; 5th-rd pick - 1990 entry draft (# 87 - Tony Burns)	To New York Rangers Kris King
September 8, 1989	To Toronto Maple Leafs Mark Laforest	To Philadelphia Flyers 6th-rd pick - 1991 entry draft^{2} (WIN - # 91 - Juha Ylonen)^{3} 7th-rd pick - 1991 entry draft (# 138 - Andrei Lomakin)
September 14, 1989	To Pittsburgh Penguins future considerations	To New York Rangers Lee Giffin
September 28, 1989	To Buffalo Sabres Steve Ludzik; 5th-rd pick - 1990 entry draft (# 100 - Todd Bojcun)	To Chicago Blackhawks Jacques Cloutier; 6th-rd pick - 1990 entry draft (# 124 - Derek Edgerly)
September 28, 1989	To Edmonton Oilers Pokey Reddick	To Winnipeg Jets future considerations
September 28, 1989	To Winnipeg Jets Keith Acton; Pete Peeters	To Philadelphia Flyers future considerations
September 28, 1989	To Boston Bruins Bobby Gould	To Washington Capitals Alain Cote

1. Calgary's second-round pick went to New Jersey as the result of a trade on June 16, 1990, that sent New Jersey's first-round and second-round picks in the 1990 entry draft to Calgary in exchange for Calgary's first-round, second-round (# 24 overall) picks in the 1990 entry draft and this pick.
2. The sixth-round pick later upgraded to a fifth-round pick in the 1991 entry draft.
3. Philadelphia's fifth-round pick went to Winnipeg as the result of a trade on October 3, 1989, that sent Keith Acton and Pete Peeters to Philadelphia in exchange for future considerations and this pick.

== October ==
October 2, 1989	To Montreal Canadiens cash	To Edmonton Oilers Randy Exelby
October 2, 1989	To Boston Bruins Mike Millar	To Washington Capitals Alfie Turcotte
October 3, 1989	To Winnipeg Jets 5th-rd pick - 1991 entry draft (# 91 - Juha Ylonen) future considerations^{1}	To Philadelphia Flyers Keith Acton; Pete Peeters
October 4, 1989	To Buffalo Sabres Dean Kennedy	To Los Angeles Kings 4th-rd pick - 1991 entry draft (# 79 - Keith Redmond)
October 5, 1989	To Quebec Nordiques Michel Petit	To New York Rangers Randy Moller
October 7, 1989	To Hartford Whalers Mike Berger	To Minnesota North Stars rights to Kevin Sullivan
October 10, 1989	To Hartford Whalers Jim Ennis	To Edmonton Oilers Norm MacIver
October 16, 1989	To New Jersey Devils 1st-rd pick - 1991 entry draft (# 3 - Scott Niedermayer)	To Toronto Maple Leafs Tom Kurvers
October 24, 1989	To Vancouver Canucks Rod Buskas	To Pittsburgh Penguins 6th-rd pick - 1990 entry draft (# 107 - Ian Moran)
October 31, 1989	To New Jersey Devils Jim Thomson	To Hartford Whalers Chris Cichocki

1. This trade also includes the cancellation of future considerations owed to Philadelphia from trade on July 21, 1989 involving Shawn Cronin.

== November ==
November 1, 1989	To Minnesota North Stars Jayson More	To New York Rangers Dave Archibald
November 2, 1989	To Edmonton Oilers Adam Graves; Petr Klima; Joe Murphy; Jeff Sharples	To Detroit Red Wings Jimmy Carson; Kevin McClelland; 5th-rd pick - 1991 entry draft (MTL - # 100 - Brad Layzell)^{1}
November 10, 1989	To Los Angeles Kings Brian Benning	To St. Louis Blues 3rd-rd pick - 1991 entry draft (# 64 - Kyle Reeves)
November 24, 1989	To Buffalo Sabres Dale DeGray future considerations	To Los Angeles Kings Bob Halkidis future considerations
November 24, 1989	To Los Angeles Kings Mikko Makela	To New York Islanders Ken Baumgartner; Hubie McDonough

1. Detroit's fifth-round pick went to Montreal as the result of a trade on June 15, 1990, that sent Rick Green to Detroit in exchange for this pick.

== December ==
December 1, 1989	To Los Angeles Kings Brad Jones	To Winnipeg Jets Phil Sykes
December 4, 1989	To Quebec Nordiques Tony McKegney	To Detroit Red Wings Greg Adams; Robert Picard
December 12, 1989	To Montreal Canadiens Todd Ewen	To St. Louis Blues future considerations (3rd-rd pick - 1991 entry draft # 65 - Nathan LaFayette)^{1}
December 13, 1989	To Hartford Whalers Randy Cunneyworth	To Winnipeg Jets Paul MacDermid
December 13, 1989	To Quebec Nordiques Tony Hrkac; Greg Millen	To St. Louis Blues Jeff Brown
December 13, 1989	To Boston Bruins Dave Christian	To Washington Capitals Bob Joyce
December 20, 1989	To Toronto Maple Leafs Mike Stevens; Gilles Thibaudeau	To New York Islanders Jack Capuano; Paul Gagne; Derek Laxdal
December 21, 1989	To Toronto Maple Leafs 4th-rd pick - 1990 entry draft (# 80 - Greg Walters)	To Edmonton Oilers Vladimir Ruzicka

1. Trade completed on June 22, 1991.

== January ==
January 5, 1990	To Buffalo Sabres future considerations	To Washington Capitals John Tucker
January 5, 1990	To Edmonton Oilers 4th-rd pick - 1990 entry draft (# 67 - Joel Blain)	To Philadelphia Flyers Normand Lacombe
January 5, 1990	To New Jersey Devils Bob Brooke	To Minnesota North Stars Aaron Broten
January 5, 1990	To Montreal Canadiens 3rd-rd pick - 1990 entry draft (# 58 - Charles Poulin)	To Chicago Blackhawks Jocelyn Lemieux
January 8, 1990	To Vancouver Canucks Dave Capuano; Andrew McBain; Dan Quinn	To Pittsburgh Penguins Rod Buskas; Barry Pederson; Tony Tanti
January 16, 1990	To Boston Bruins Dave Poulin	To Philadelphia Flyers Ken Linseman
January 18, 1990	To Edmonton Oilers future considerations	To New York Rangers Todd Charlesworth
January 20, 1990	To Los Angeles Kings Tony Granato; Tomas Sandstrom	To New York Rangers Bernie Nicholls
January 22, 1990	To Minnesota North Stars Daniel Berthiaume	To Winnipeg Jets future considerations
January 22, 1990	To St. Louis Blues Ron Wilson	To Winnipeg Jets Doug Evans

== February ==
February 26, 1990	To Vancouver Canucks cash	To Pittsburgh Penguins Doug Smith

== March ==
- Trading Deadline: March 7, 1990

March 2, 1990	To Boston Bruins Brian Propp	To Philadelphia Flyers 2nd-rd pick - 1990 entry draft (# 42 - Terran Sandwith)
March 3, 1990	To Hartford Whalers Jeff Sirkka	To Boston Bruins Steve Dykstra
March 5, 1990	To Hartford Whalers Yvon Corriveau	To Washington Capitals Mike Liut
March 5, 1990	To Buffalo Sabres Jay Wells; 4th-rd pick - 1991 entry draft (# 72 - Peter Ambroziak)	To Philadelphia Flyers Kevin Maguire; 2nd-rd pick - 1990 entry draft (# 40 - Mikael Renberg)
March 5, 1990	To Quebec Nordiques Mario Doyon; Everett Sanipass; Dan Vincelette	To Chicago Blackhawks Michel Goulet; Greg Millen; 6th-rd pick - 1991 entry draft (# 112 - Kevin St. Jacques)
March 6, 1990	To Hartford Whalers Cam Brauer	To Edmonton Oilers Marc Laforge
March 6, 1990	To Minnesota North Stars Ulf Dahlen; 4th-rd pick - 1990 entry draft (# 70 - Cal McGowan) future considerations (4th-rd pick - 1991 entry draft LAK - # 81 - Alexei Zhitnik)^{1}	To New York Rangers Mike Gartner
March 6, 1990	To Chicago Blackhawks future considerations	To Pittsburgh Penguins Alain Chevrier
March 6, 1990	To Edmonton Oilers future considerations	To Pittsburgh Penguins Brian Wilks
March 6, 1990	To New Jersey Devils Jeff Sharples	To Edmonton Oilers Reijo Ruotsalainen
March 6, 1990	To New Jersey Devils Peter Stastny	To Quebec Nordiques Craig Wolanin future considerations (Randy Velischek)^{2}
March 6, 1990	To Vancouver Canucks Jack Capuano	To New York Islanders Jeff Rohlicek
March 6, 1990	To New Jersey Devils 5th-rd pick - 1990 entry draft (# 104 - Petr Kuchyna)	To Calgary Flames Jim Korn
March 6, 1990	To Vancouver Canucks Adrien Plavsic; 1st-rd pick - 1990 entry draft (# 18 - Shawn Antoski); 2nd-rd pick - 1991 entry draft (MTL - # 43 - Craig Darby)^{3}	To St. Louis Blues Harold Snepsts; Rich Sutter; 2nd-rd pick - 1990 entry draft (# 33 - Craig Johnson)
March 6, 1990	To Montreal Canadiens 2nd-rd pick - 1991 entry draft (# 43 - Craig Darby)	To Vancouver Canucks Jyrki Lumme

1. Minnesota's fourth-round pick went to Los Angeles as the result of a trade on June 22, 1991, that sent Todd Elik to Minnesota in exchange for Randy Gilhen, Charlie Huddy, Jim Thomson and this pick.
2. Trade completed on August 13, 1990.
3. Vancouver's second-round pick went to Montreal as the result of a trade on March 6, 1990, that sent Jyrki Lumme to Vancouver in exchange for this pick.

== See also ==
- 1989-90 NHL season
- 1989 NHL entry draft
- 1989 in sports
- 1990 in sports
