= Hamrlík =

Hamrlík is a Czech surname. Notable people with the surname include:

- Martin Hamrlík (born 1973), Czech ice hockey player
- Roman Hamrlík (born 1974), Czech ice hockey player, brother of Martin
