= Petr Klíma =

Czech ice hockey player (1964–2023)

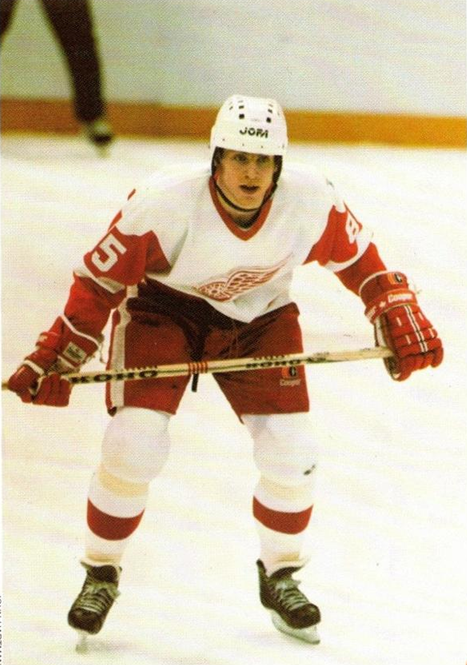
- Born: 23 December 1964 Chomutov, Czechoslovakia
- Died: 4 May 2023 (aged 58) Chomutov, Czech Republic
- Height: 6 ft 0 in (183 cm)
- Weight: 183 lb (83 kg; 13 st 1 lb)
- Position: Winger
- Shot: Right
- Played for: HC Litvínov; HC Dukla Jihlava; Detroit Red Wings; Edmonton Oilers; Tampa Bay Lightning; PSG Berani Zlín; Los Angeles Kings; Pittsburgh Penguins; Krefeld Pinguine
- National team: Czechoslovakia
- NHL draft: 86th overall, 1983; Detroit Red Wings
- Playing career: 1981–2003

Petr Klíma (23 December 1964 – 4 May 2023) was a Czech professional ice hockey forward. He played in the National Hockey League (NHL) for the Detroit Red Wings, Edmonton Oilers, Tampa Bay Lightning, Los Angeles Kings, and the Pittsburgh Penguins between 1985 and 1999. Internationally Klíma played for the Czechoslovak national team at the 1983, winning silver, and 1984 World Junior Championships, winning bronze, and the 1984 Canada Cup. With the Oilers, Klíma won the Stanley Cup in 1990; arguably his most famous goal as a player came in game one when he scored the game-winning goal in triple-overtime (55:13) of what remains the longest Stanley Cup Final game in history.

== Early career and defection ==
Klíma was drafted in the fifth round (86th overall) of the 1983 NHL entry draft by the Detroit Red Wings.

By the time Klíma was 20 years old, officials on his HC Dukla Jihlava team knew that the Detroit Red Wings were eager to bring the young star to the NHL. Rumors were rampant that the Wings were trying to pay off Czechoslovak authorities to get Klíma out of his native country, but despite all the hype that surrounded him, Czechoslovak hockey authorities made no real effort to clamp down and prevent Klíma from traveling in Europe. As a result, Klíma managed to defect to North America during the summer of 1985, making him the first Czech player to defect directly to a U.S.-based team rather than one of the NHL's Canadian teams which had smuggled several Czechs and Slovaks out of Europe in the past.

Klima's bold move was entirely orchestrated by the Red Wings, who knew that Klíma was eager to play in North America. After his defection was planned, Klíma ditched his Czechoslovak national teammates during a team meal at the Czechoslovak training camp in Nußdorf am Inn, West Germany, to join Wings executive vice-president Jim Lites and assistant coach Nick Polano at an undisclosed location on 18 August 1985. Several days were then spent in the effort to bring Klíma to North America, after Lites and Polano, who had flown to Germany on 15 August 1985, kept Klíma under wraps in Nussdorf and other cities to avoid pursuit by Czechoslovak police. Polano stayed with Klíma as Lites and other Wings officials arranged for him to gain refugee status to enter the United States. The Wings were assisted by U.S. Attorney General Edwin Meese and U.S. Deputy Attorney General Lowell Jensen in expediting the political asylum process.

It was later revealed that plans to get Klíma out of Czechoslovakia reached back as far as the 1984 World Junior Championships, held in Sweden, when Detroit scout Alex Davidson secretly met with Klíma in December 1983. Klíma told Davidson he would not consider defecting until he had completed his military duty (so as not to be labeled a deserter) in 1985. Less than a year later, at the 1984 Canada Cup, Klíma began talking to the Wings about the possibility of coming to the NHL after the 1984–85 season. During that time, while in Vancouver with the Czechoslovak team, he even signed a secret multiyear contract with the Red Wings. Klíma, who spoke no English when he finally arrived in Detroit on 22 September 1985, was fortunate that the Red Wings also managed to bring his girlfriend to the U.S. In honor of his successful defection, a grateful and overjoyed Klíma requested sweater number 85 and wore it throughout his NHL career as a reminder of the year in which he gained freedom.

== NHL playing career ==
Klíma played four full seasons with the Wings (from 1985 until 1989) before being traded during the 1989–90 season to the Oilers (along with Joe Murphy, Adam Graves, and Jeff Sharples) for Jimmy Carson, Kevin McClelland, and a fifth round draft pick in the 1991 NHL entry draft. Klima scored the game-winning goal in the longest Stanley Cup Finals game in history, in the third overtime of game one of the 1990 Final against Andy Moog of the Boston Bruins despite having not played at all in the third period, nor the first two OT periods. He played for the Oilers until 1993, winning the Stanley Cup in 1990. In 1993 Klima was acquired by the Tampa Bay Lightning in exchange for future considerations; Klíma remained with the Lightning for three seasons, until 1996. He split the 1996–97 season between the Lumberjacks, Kings, Penguins, and Oilers, and was released in 1997. He played in the DEL in 1997–98, then attempted a comeback with the Red Wings in 1998. He retired from the NHL in 1999, and then played two seasons in years 2001–2003 in the Czech league before retiring for good. He played for Litvinov and captained those 2 years. Asked which jersey number he wanted to wear, Klíma chose the number 85 in recognition of the year of his defection and his first year in the NHL.

== Klíma's disciplinary woes ==
Although he was one of Detroit's bigger stars in the late 1980s, Klíma was also a problem for the Red Wings management. That situation came to a head during training camp on 23 September 1988, when Detroit suspended Klíma indefinitely, along with Bob Probert, for breaking team rules. At the time of the suspension, the Wings said they would trade Klíma, although this never happened. The team also said it would not take Klíma back until he had his drinking under control. As a result, Klíma missed the start of the 1988–89 season before being reinstated on 13 October, and sent to Adirondack (AHL) on 16 October. He finally made his 1988–89 NHL regular season debut during Detroit's 6 November, game versus the Edmonton where he posted an assist. At his first practice with the team, on 5 November, Klíma offered a heartfelt apology to his Wings teammates for his earlier behavior, much of which was alcohol-related. During his months back, Klíma roomed with Probert, who was also trying to cope with his drinking and drug habits. Klíma managed to stay clean, but Probert's substance abuse and subsequent issues would continue for several years.

== Personal life and death ==
Klíma's father Joseph was also a hockey player, who played internationally for Czechoslovakia. Klíma was married, and with his wife Irina had a daughter, Jessi and twin sons, Kelly and Kevin. Both Kelly and Kevin are hockey players, and signed one-year contracts with the Tucson Roadrunners of the American Hockey League in 2018. At the time of Petr's death, Kelly was playing in the Czech Republic.

Klima operated as owner, GM, and head coach of a handful of youth hockey teams in the suburban Detroit region that worked with children that had been imported from the Czech Republic, with Kilma's mission being to help them acclimate to life on and off the ice in North America, stating “Instead of bringing the kids over here when they’re 16 and 17, we want to bring them early so they can learn the language, learn the culture and learn the hockey style. I have seen so many players go back home [to Europe] because they get homesick, they don’t know the language and they’re not confident.”

Klíma died on 4 May 2023, at his home in Chomutov, at the age of 58.

== Career statistics ==
=== Regular season and playoffs ===
			Regular season					Playoffs
Season	Team	League	GP	G	A	Pts	PIM	GP	G	A	Pts	PIM
1981–82	TJ CHZ Litvínov	CSSR	18	7	3	10	8	—	—	—	—	—
1982–83	TJ CHZ Litvínov	CSSR	44	19	17	36	74	—	—	—	—	—
1983–84	ASD Dukla Jihlava	CSSR	41	20	16	36	46	—	—	—	—	—
1984–85	ASD Dukla Jihlava	CSSR	35	23	22	45	76	—	—	—	—	—
1985–86	Detroit Red Wings	NHL	74	32	24	56	16	—	—	—	—	—
1986–87	Detroit Red Wings	NHL	77	30	23	53	42	13	1	2	3	4
1987–88	Detroit Red Wings	NHL	78	37	25	62	46	12	10	8	18	10
1988–89	Adirondack Red Wings	AHL	5	5	1	6	4	—	—	—	—	—
1988–89	Detroit Red Wings	NHL	51	25	16	41	44	6	2	4	6	19
1989–90	Detroit Red Wings	NHL	13	5	5	10	6	—	—	—	—	—
1989–90	Edmonton Oilers	NHL	63	25	28	53	66	21	5	0	5	8
1990–91	Edmonton Oilers	NHL	70	40	28	68	113	18	7	6	13	16
1991–92	Edmonton Oilers	NHL	57	21	13	34	52	15	1	4	5	8
1992–93	Edmonton Oilers	NHL	68	32	16	48	100	—	—	—	—	—
1993–94	Tampa Bay Lightning	NHL	75	28	27	55	76	—	—	—	—	—
1994–95	AC ZPS Zlín	CZE	1	1	0	1	0	—	—	—	—	—
1994–95	EC Wolfsburg	GER.2	12	27	11	38	28	—	—	—	—	—
1994–95	Tampa Bay Lightning	NHL	47	13	13	26	26	—	—	—	—	—
1995–96	Tampa Bay Lightning	NHL	67	22	30	52	68	4	2	0	2	14
1996–97	Cleveland Lumberjacks	IHL	19	7	14	21	6	—	—	—	—	—
1996–97	Los Angeles Kings	NHL	8	0	4	4	2	—	—	—	—	—
1996–97	Pittsburgh Penguins	NHL	9	1	3	4	4	—	—	—	—	—
1996–97	Edmonton Oilers	NHL	16	1	5	6	6	6	0	0	0	4
1997–98	Krefeld Pinguine	DEL	38	7	12	19	18	—	—	—	—	—
1998–99	Adirondack Red Wings	AHL	15	2	6	8	8	—	—	—	—	—
1998–99	Detroit Red Wings	NHL	13	1	0	1	4	—	—	—	—	—
2001–02	HC Chemopetrol	CZE	52	24	10	34	36	—	—	—	—	—
2002–03	HC Chemopetrol	CZE	41	13	6	19	28	—	—	—	—	—
NHL totals			786	313	260	573	671	95	28	24	52	83

=== International ===
Medal record

Representing Czechoslovakia

World Junior Championships
Silver medal – second place	1983 Soviet Union	
Bronze medal – third place	1984 Sweden	

European Junior Championships
Silver medal – second place	1982 Sweden	

Year	Team	Event	GP	G	A	Pts	PIM
1982	Czechoslovakia	EJC	5	7	2	9	12
1983	Czechoslovakia	WJC	7	4	4	8	6
1984	Czechoslovakia	WJC	7	6	4	10	22
1984	Czechoslovakia	CC	5	2	1	3	4
Junior totals			19	17	10	27	40
Senior totals			5	2	1	3	4

== Achievements ==
- Czechoslovak First Ice Hockey League champion – 1983–84, 1984–85
- Stanley Cup champion – 1990 He scored the game winning goal in game one while injured
