= Aris Brimanis =

American ice hockey player (born 1972)

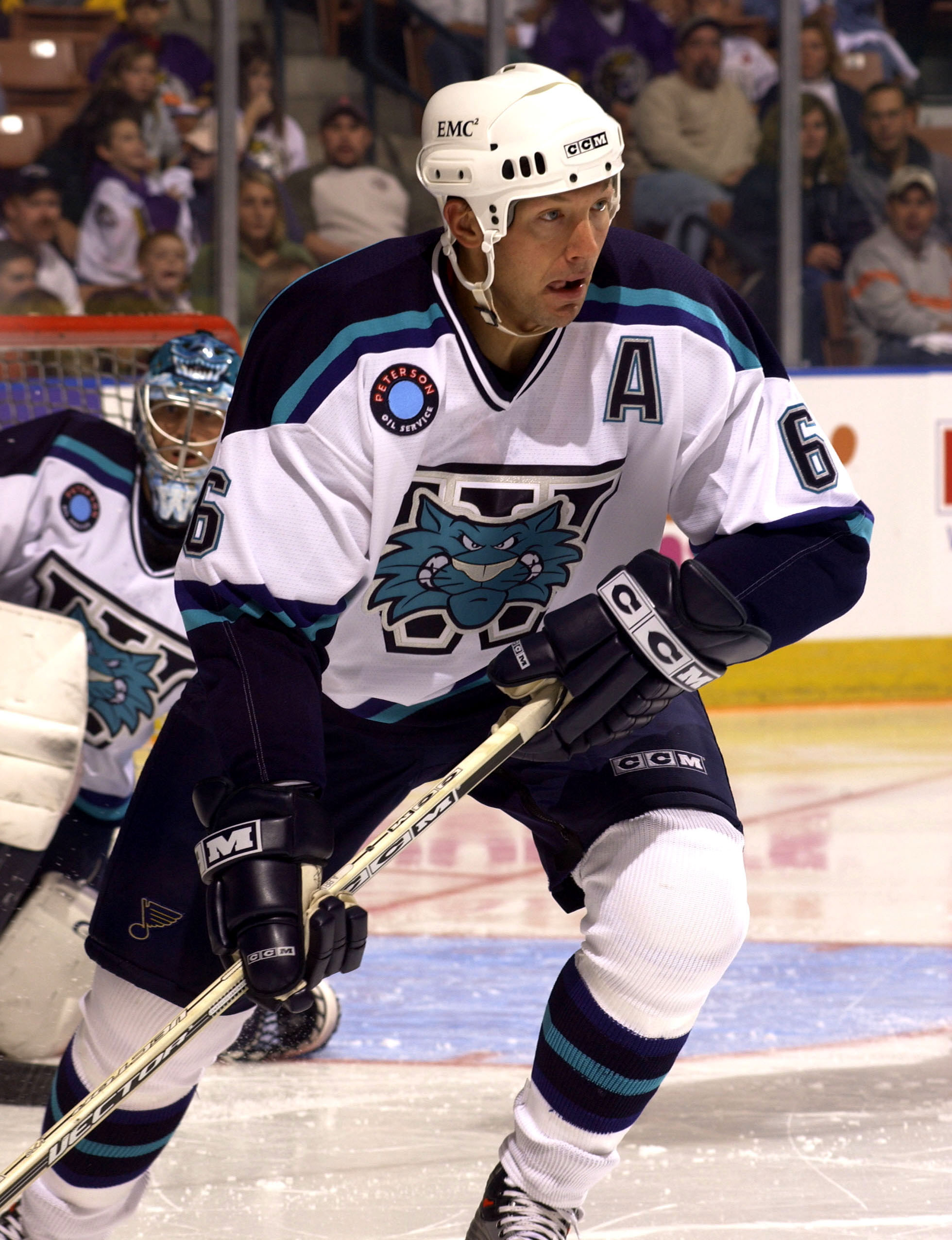
- Brimanis with the Worcester IceCats during the 2004-05 season
- Born: March 14, 1972 (age 54) Cleveland, Ohio, U.S.
- Height: 6 ft 3 in (191 cm)
- Weight: 215 lb (98 kg; 15 st 5 lb)
- Position: Defense
- Shot: Right
- Played for: Philadelphia Flyers; New York Islanders; Mighty Ducks of Anaheim; St. Louis Blues
- National team: United States
- NHL draft: 86th overall, 1991; Philadelphia Flyers
- Playing career: 1993–2012

Āris Aldis Brīmanis (born March 14, 1972) is an American former professional ice hockey defenseman from Shaker Heights, Ohio who played seven seasons in the National Hockey League (NHL). Aris Brimanis was involved in a trade for Jari Kurri.

== Playing career ==
At junior level, Brimanis played for Bowling Green State University and then for the Brandon Wheat Kings of the Western Hockey League. He was drafted 86th overall by the Philadelphia Flyers in the 1991 NHL entry draft. As well as the Flyers, he also played for the New York Islanders, the Mighty Ducks of Anaheim and the St. Louis Blues. He played a total of 113 NHL games, scoring 2 goals and 12 assists for 14 points, collecting 57 penalty minutes. In 2005, Brimanis moved to the Swiss Nationalliga A, joining the Kloten Flyers where he spent 2 seasons before joining Hannover in 2007.

Brimanis spent four seasons with the Hannover Scorpions of the Deutsche Eishockey Liga before leaving as a free agent after the 2010–11 season.

== Career statistics ==
			Regular season					Playoffs
Season	Team	League	GP	G	A	Pts	PIM	GP	G	A	Pts	PIM
1990–91	Bowling Green	CCHA	38	3	6	9	42	—	—	—	—	—
1991–92	Bowling Green	CCHA	32	2	9	11	38	—	—	—	—	—
1992–93	Brandon Wheat Kings	WHL	71	8	50	58	110	4	2	1	3	7
1993–94	Hershey Bears	AHL	75	8	15	23	65	11	2	3	5	12
1993–94	Philadelphia Flyers	NHL	1	0	0	0	0	—	—	—	—	—
1994–95	Hershey Bears	AHL	76	8	17	25	68	6	1	1	2	14
1995–96	Hershey Bears	AHL	54	9	22	31	64	5	1	2	3	4
1995–96	Philadelphia Flyers	NHL	17	0	2	2	12	—	—	—	—	—
1996–97	Philadelphia Phantoms	AHL	65	14	18	32	69	10	2	2	4	13
1996–97	Philadelphia Flyers	NHL	3	0	1	1	0	—	—	—	—	—
1997–98	Michigan K-Wings	IHL	35	3	9	12	24	4	1	0	1	4
1997–98	Philadelphia Phantoms	AHL	30	1	11	12	26	—	—	—	—	—
1998–99	Fredericton Canadiens	AHL	8	2	4	6	6	15	3	10	13	18
1998–99	Grand Rapids Griffins	IHL	66	16	21	37	70	—	—	—	—	—
1999–00	New York Islanders	NHL	18	2	1	3	6	—	—	—	—	—
1999–00	Providence Bruins	AHL	7	0	2	2	2	14	3	4	7	10
1999–00	Kansas City Blades	IHL	46	5	17	22	28	—	—	—	—	—
2000–01	Chicago Wolves	IHL	20	2	2	4	14	16	3	1	4	8
2000–01	New York Islanders	NHL	56	0	8	8	26	—	—	—	—	—
2001–02	Cincinnati Mighty Ducks	AHL	72	2	9	11	44	3	1	0	1	0
2001–02	Mighty Ducks of Anaheim	NHL	5	0	0	0	9	—	—	—	—	—
2002–03	Worcester IceCats	AHL	38	8	13	21	51	3	0	0	0	2
2003–04	Worcester IceCats	AHL	65	4	15	19	56	10	1	0	1	6
2003–04	St. Louis Blues	NHL	13	0	0	0	4	—	—	—	—	—
2004–05	Worcester IceCats	AHL	69	4	13	17	44	—	—	—	—	—
2005–06	Kloten Flyers	NLA	36	2	8	10	56	11	0	4	4	16
2006–07	Kloten Flyers	NLA	44	5	10	15	80	—	—	—	—	—
2007–08	Hannover Scorpions	DEL	53	4	7	11	44	3	0	0	0	0
2008–09	Hannover Scorpions	DEL	49	5	11	16	38	11	0	0	0	8
2009–10	Hannover Scorpions	DEL	56	8	18	26	48	11	1	4	5	4
2010–11	Hannover Scorpions	DEL	52	6	13	19	50	5	3	0	3	2
NHL totals			113	2	12	14	57	—	—	—	—	—
