= Kevin Maguire (ice hockey) =

Canadian ice hockey player and referee

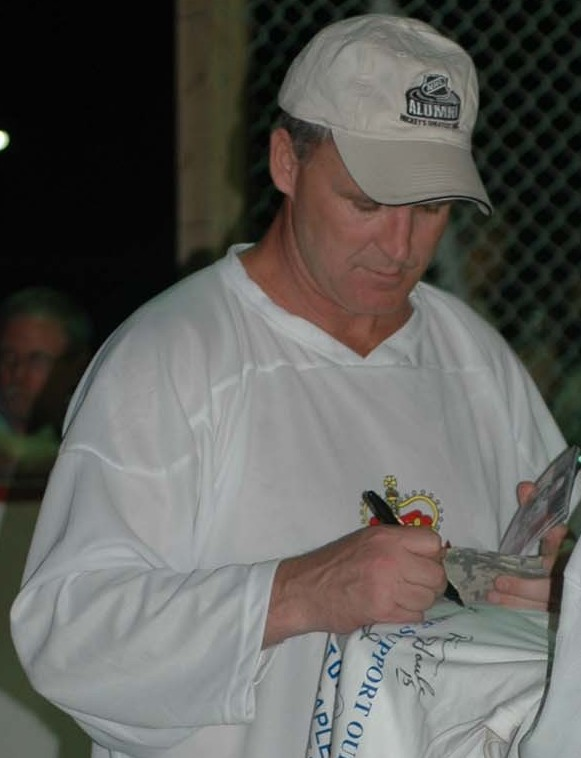
- Maguire at Kandahar Air Field
- Born: January 5, 1963 (age 63) Toronto, Ontario, Canada
- Height: 6 ft 2 in (188 cm)
- Weight: 200 lb (91 kg; 14 st 4 lb)
- Position: Right wing
- Shot: Right
- Played for: Toronto Maple Leafs; Buffalo Sabres; Philadelphia Flyers
- NHL draft: Undrafted
- Playing career: 1984–1993

Kevin Maguire (born January 5, 1963) is a Canadian former professional ice hockey forward and referee. He played in the National Hockey League (NHL) with the Toronto Maple Leafs, Buffalo Sabres, and Philadelphia Flyers.

In his NHL career, Maguire appeared in 260 games. He scored 29 goals and added 30 assists while accumulating 782 penalty minutes. After his playing career, he pursued a career in officiating. He first worked as an NHL referee in 1999–2000.

== Career statistics ==
			Regular season					Playoffs
Season	Team	League	GP	G	A	Pts	PIM	GP	G	A	Pts	PIM
1982–83	Oshawa Generals	OHL	1	0	0	0	0	—	—	—	—	—
1982–83	Orillia Travelways	OJHL	41	18	28	46	139	—	—	—	—	—
1983–84	Orillia Travelways	OJHL	37	31	42	73	137	—	—	—	—	—
1984–85	St. Catharines Saints	AHL	76	10	15	25	112	—	—	—	—	—
1985–86	St. Catharines Saints	AHL	61	6	9	15	161	1	0	0	0	0
1986–87	Newmarket Saints	AHL	51	4	2	6	131	—	—	—	—	—
1986–87	Toronto Maple Leafs	NHL	17	0	0	0	74	1	0	0	0	0
1987–88	Buffalo Sabres	NHL	46	4	6	10	162	5	0	0	0	50
1988–89	Buffalo Sabres	NHL	60	8	10	18	241	5	0	0	0	36
1989–90	Buffalo Sabres	NHL	61	6	9	15	115	—	—	—	—	—
1989–90	Philadelphia Flyers	NHL	5	1	0	1	6	—	—	—	—	—
1990–91	Toronto Maple Leafs	NHL	63	9	5	14	180	—	—	—	—	—
1991–92	St. John's Maple Leafs	AHL	30	11	15	26	112	11	3	7	10	43
1991–92	Toronto Maple Leafs	NHL	8	1	0	1	4	—	—	—	—	—
1993–94	Lee Valley Lions	BHL	2	0	0	0	0	—	—	—	—	—
NHL totals			260	29	30	59	782	11	0	0	0	86

== NHL Transactions ==
- October 10, 1984: Signed as a free agent by the Toronto Maple Leafs.
- October 5, 1987: Claimed by the Buffalo Sabres in the 1987 NHL Waiver Draft.
- March 5, 1990: Traded to the Philadelphia Flyers, along with Buffalo's 2nd round choice in the 1990 draft (Mikael Renberg) in exchange for Jay Wells and Philadelphia's 4th round pick in the 1991 draft (Peter Ambroziak).
- June 16, 1990: Traded to the Toronto Maple Leafs, along with Philadelphia's 8th round choice in the 1991 draft (Dmitri Mironov) in exchange for Toronto's 3rd round pick in the 1990 draft (Al Kinisky).

Transactions via Hockey Reference
