= Darcy Werenka =

Canadian-Austrian ice hockey player

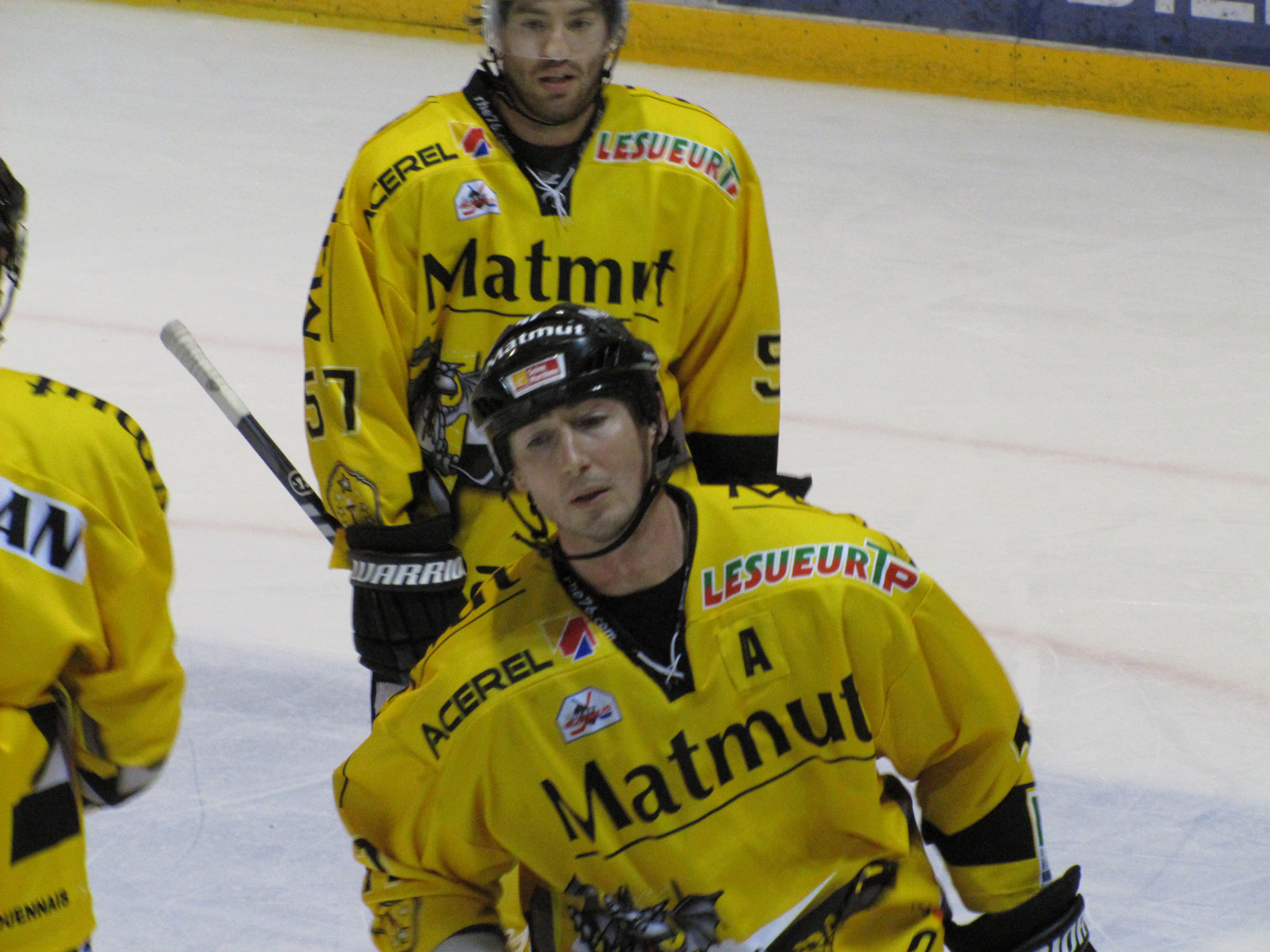
- Born: May 13, 1973 (age 53) Beaumont, Alberta, Canada
- Height: 6 ft 1 in (185 cm)
- Weight: 210 lb (95 kg; 15 st 0 lb)
- Position: Defence
- Shot: Right
- Played for: Binghamton Rangers; Chicago Wolves; Atlanta Knights; Quebec Rafales; Houston Aeros; Wiener EV; Utah Grizzlies; Jokerit; HPK; SERC Wild Wings; Kölner Haie; Vienna Capitals; Graz 99ers Rouen HE 76
- National team: Austria
- NHL draft: 37th overall, 1991; New York Rangers
- Playing career: 1993–2013

Darcy Werenka (born May 13, 1973) is a Canadian-Austrian former professional ice hockey defenceman whose career spanned over 20 years enjoying most success in the European Leagues.

== Playing career ==
Werenka was drafted 37th overall by the New York Rangers in the 1991 NHL entry draft, but never played in the NHL, instead spending three seasons in the American Hockey League with the Binghamton Rangers.

After playing for different IHL teams in two seasons, Werenka moved to Europe and joined Austrian side Vienna Capitals in 1997, spending two seasons with them. After a season back in the IHL with the Utah Grizzlies, Werenka returned to Europe and played in Finland's SM-liiga, splitting the year with Jokerit and HPK. He then played two seasons in the Deutsche Eishockey Liga, playing for the SERC Wild Wings and the Kölner Haie. In 2003, he returned to Vienna and helped guide the team to their first ever Austrian ice hockey championship in 2005.

At the latter stages of his career, he moved on from the EBEL in 2011, to enjoy a single season in the French Ligue Magnus with Rouen HE 76.

== International play ==
In April 2008 he gained Austrian citizenship. Werenka promptly made his debut for the Austrian National Team at the following 2008 IIHF World Championships in Division I. He finished his international career with over 60 appearances.

== Career statistics ==
| | | | Regular season | | | | | Playoffs |
| Season | Team | League | GP | G | A | Pts | PIM | GP | G | A | Pts | PIM |
|---|---|---|---|---|---|---|---|---|---|---|---|---|
| 1988–89 | Sherwood Park Crusaders | AJHL | 37 | 12 | 25 | 37 | 2 | — | — | — | — | — |
| 1989–90 | Lethbridge Hurricanes | WHL | 63 | 1 | 18 | 19 | 16 | 19 | 0 | 2 | 2 | 4 |
| 1990–91 | Lethbridge Hurricanes | WHL | 72 | 13 | 37 | 50 | 39 | 16 | 1 | 7 | 8 | 4 |
| 1991–92 | Lethbridge Hurricanes | WHL | 69 | 17 | 58 | 75 | 56 | 5 | 2 | 1 | 3 | 0 |
| 1992–93 | Lethbridge Hurricanes | WHL | 19 | 4 | 17 | 21 | 12 | — | — | — | — | — |
| 1992–93 | Brandon Wheat Kings | WHL | 36 | 4 | 25 | 29 | 19 | 3 | 0 | 0 | 0 | 2 |
| 1992–93 | Binghamton Rangers | AHL | 3 | 0 | 1 | 1 | 2 | 3 | 0 | 0 | 0 | 0 |
| 1993–94 | Binghamton Rangers | AHL | 53 | 5 | 22 | 27 | 10 | — | — | — | — | — |
| 1994–95 | Binghamton Rangers | AHL | 73 | 18 | 29 | 47 | 12 | 11 | 4 | 3 | 7 | 2 |
| 1995–96 | Chicago Wolves | IHL | 12 | 2 | 5 | 7 | 10 | — | — | — | — | — |
| 1995–96 | Atlanta Knights | IHL | 58 | 6 | 20 | 26 | 22 | 3 | 0 | 2 | 2 | 0 |
| 1996–97 | Quebec Rafales | IHL | 5 | 1 | 1 | 2 | 2 | — | — | — | — | — |
| 1996–97 | Houston Aeros | IHL | 74 | 12 | 20 | 32 | 31 | 13 | 2 | 1 | 3 | 2 |
| 1997–98 | Wiener EV | Austria | 42 | 5 | 15 | 20 | 18 | — | — | — | — | — |
| 1998–99 | Wiener EV | Austria | 47 | 11 | 22 | 33 | 16 | — | — | — | — | — |
| 1999–00 | Utah Grizzlies | IHL | 82 | 15 | 24 | 39 | 34 | 5 | 0 | 0 | 0 | 0 |
| 2000–01 | Jokerit | Liiga | 10 | 1 | 2 | 3 | 8 | — | — | — | — | — |
| 2000–01 | HPK | Liiga | 45 | 6 | 9 | 15 | 34 | — | — | — | — | — |
| 2001–02 | SERC Wild Wings | DEL | 49 | 6 | 23 | 29 | 24 | — | — | — | — | — |
| 2002–03 | Kölner Haie | DEL | 44 | 3 | 9 | 12 | 32 | 9 | 0 | 0 | 0 | 0 |
| 2003–04 | Vienna Capitals | EBEL | 48 | 9 | 15 | 24 | 30 | — | — | — | — | — |
| 2004–05 | Vienna Capitals | EBEL | 48 | 23 | 27 | 50 | 42 | 10 | 3 | 6 | 9 | 6 |
| 2005–06 | Vienna Capitals | EBEL | 47 | 13 | 26 | 39 | 24 | 5 | 0 | 1 | 1 | 4 |
| 2006–07 | Vienna Capitals | EBEL | 56 | 19 | 42 | 61 | 62 | 3 | 1 | 1 | 2 | 4 |
| 2007–08 | Vienna Capitals | EBEL | 46 | 7 | 25 | 32 | 48 | 7 | 1 | 2 | 3 | 6 |
| 2008–09 | Vienna Capitals | EBEL | 38 | 9 | 18 | 27 | 36 | 12 | 1 | 10 | 11 | 20 |
| 2009–10 | Vienna Capitals | EBEL | 37 | 8 | 22 | 30 | 22 | — | — | — | — | — |
| 2010–11 | Graz 99ers | EBEL | 54 | 10 | 20 | 30 | 40 | 4 | 2 | 1 | 3 | 2 |
| 2011–12 | Dragons de Rouen | France | 26 | 4 | 20 | 24 | 18 | 15 | 0 | 7 | 7 | 8 |
| 2012–13 | Kapfenberger SV | Austria3 | 7 | 2 | 7 | 9 | 4 | 7 | 1 | 8 | 9 | 6 |
| AHL totals | | | 129 | 23 | 52 | 75 | 24 | 14 | 4 | 3 | 7 | 2 |
| IHL totals | | | 231 | 36 | 70 | 106 | 99 | 21 | 2 | 3 | 5 | 2 |
| EBEL totals | | | 374 | 98 | 195 | 293 | 304 | 41 | 8 | 21 | 29 | 42 |

== Awards ==
- WHL East Second All-Star Team – 1991
