= Carl LeBlanc (ice hockey) =

Canadian ice hockey player

- Born: June 9, 1971 (age 54) Drummondville, QC, Canada
- Height: 6 ft 0 in (183 cm)
- Weight: 201 lb (91 kg; 14 st 5 lb)
- Position: Defense
- Shot: Left
- Played for: Knoxville Cherokees; Houston Aeros; South Carolina Stingrays; Quad City Mallards; Portland Pirates; Colorado Gold Kings; Long Beach Ice Dogs; Adirondack IceHawks; Knoxville Speed
- NHL draft: 212th overall, 1991; Washington Capitals
- Playing career: 1992–2002

Carl LeBlanc (born June 9, 1971) is a Canadian former professional ice hockey defenceman.

== Career ==
LeBlanc played major junior hockey with the Granby Bisons and Beauport Harfangs of the Quebec Major Junior Hockey League, then went on to play ten seasons in the minor leagues before retiring as a professional player following the 2001–02 season.

== Career statistics ==
| | | | Regular season | | | | | Playoffs |
| Season | Team | League | GP | G | A | Pts | PIM | GP | G | A | Pts | PIM |
|---|---|---|---|---|---|---|---|---|---|---|---|---|
| 1987–88 | Laval Regents | QMAAA | 42 | 9 | 30 | 39 | 76 | — | — | — | — | — |
| 1988–89 | Granby Bisons | QMJHL | 64 | 2 | 14 | 16 | 90 | 4 | 0 | 1 | 1 | 11 |
| 1989–90 | Granby Bisons | QMJHL | 65 | 12 | 26 | 38 | 84 | — | — | — | — | — |
| 1990–91 | Granby Bisons | QMJHL | 57 | 7 | 28 | 35 | 58 | — | — | — | — | — |
| 1991–92 | Granby Bisons | QMJHL | 47 | 6 | 43 | 49 | 123 | — | — | — | — | — |
| 1991–92 | Beauport Harfangs | QMJHL | 16 | 1 | 11 | 12 | 68 | — | — | — | — | — |
| 1992–93 | Knoxville Cherokees | ECHL | 59 | 6 | 16 | 22 | 110 | — | — | — | — | — |
| 1993–94 | Knoxville Cherokees | ECHL | 68 | 15 | 42 | 57 | 157 | 3 | 0 | 1 | 1 | 12 |
| 1994–95 | Knoxville Cherokees | ECHL | 62 | 6 | 47 | 53 | 192 | 4 | 0 | 2 | 2 | 19 |
| 1994–95 | Houston Aeros | IHL | 2 | 0 | 0 | 0 | 5 | — | — | — | — | — |
| 1995–96 | South Carolina Stingrays | ECHL | 61 | 3 | 31 | 34 | 86 | 8 | 0 | 3 | 3 | 32 |
| 1996–97 | Quad City Mallards | CoHL | 72 | 2 | 38 | 40 | 101 | 15 | 0 | 8 | 8 | 14 |
| 1997–98 | Portland Pirates | AHL | 2 | 0 | 0 | 0 | 0 | — | — | — | — | — |
| 1997–98 | Quad City Mallards | UHL | 70 | 8 | 39 | 47 | 180 | 20 | 2 | 7 | 9 | 14 |
| 1998–99 | Quad City Mallards | UHL | 66 | 6 | 46 | 52 | 173 | 12 | 0 | 1 | 1 | 20 |
| 1999–00 | Colorado Gold Kings | WCHL | 66 | 9 | 37 | 46 | 126 | 7 | 2 | 1 | 3 | 8 |
| 2000–01 | Colorado Gold Kings | WCHL | 40 | 5 | 13 | 18 | 105 | — | — | — | — | — |
| 2000–01 | Long Beach Ice Dogs | WCHL | 27 | 4 | 12 | 16 | 73 | 8 | 1 | 7 | 8 | 14 |
| 2001–02 | Adirondack IceHawks | UHL | 27 | 1 | 7 | 8 | 50 | — | — | — | — | — |
| 2001–02 | Knoxville Speed | UHL | 42 | 3 | 23 | 26 | 49 | — | — | — | — | — |
| ECHL totals | | | 250 | 30 | 136 | 166 | 545 | 15 | 0 | 6 | 6 | 63 |
| UHL totals | | | 205 | 18 | 115 | 133 | 452 | 32 | 2 | 8 | 10 | 34 |
