= 1991 NHL entry draft =

1991 North American ice hockey draft

General information
- Date: June 22, 1991
- Location: Memorial Auditorium; Buffalo, New York, U.S.

Overview
- 264 total selections in 12 rounds
- First selection: (Canada) Eric Lindros (Quebec Nordiques)
- Hall of Famers: 3: C Eric Lindros; D Scott Niedermayer; C Peter Forsberg

The 1991 NHL entry draft was the 29th draft for the National Hockey League. It was held on June 22 at the Memorial Auditorium in Buffalo, New York. A total of 264 players were drafted. The worst team in the previous 1990–91 season, the Quebec Nordiques, was given the first overall pick while the expansion San Jose Sharks held the second overall pick.

The draft was famous for the controversy surrounding star first overall draft pick, touted by some observers to be The Next One, Eric Lindros, who was drafted by the Quebec Nordiques but immediately refused to sign a contract. What followed (in 1992) was one of the biggest trades in NHL history, which the Philadelphia Flyers used to acquire Lindros, in the process trading away future superstar Peter Forsberg.

The last active player in the NHL from this draft class was Ray Whitney, who retired after the 2013–14 season.

== Selections by round ==
Club teams in North America unless otherwise noted.

=== Round one ===
= NHL All-Star team ·	= NHL All-Star (Note: Players are identified as an All-Star if they were selected for the All-Star game at any time in their career.) ·	= NHL All-Star and NHL All-Star team ·	= Hall of Famers

#	Player	Nationality	NHL team	College/junior/club team
1	Eric Lindros (C)	Canada	Quebec Nordiques	Oshawa Generals (OHL)
2	Pat Falloon (RW)	Canada	San Jose Sharks	Spokane Chiefs (WHL)
3	Scott Niedermayer (D)	Canada	New Jersey Devils (from Toronto)^{1}	Kamloops Blazers (WHL)
4	Scott Lachance (D)	United States	New York Islanders	Boston University (Hockey East)
5	Aaron Ward (D)	Canada	Winnipeg Jets	University of Michigan (CCHA)
6	Peter Forsberg (C)	Sweden	Philadelphia Flyers	Modo Hockey (Sweden)
7	Alek Stojanov (RW)	Canada	Vancouver Canucks	Hamilton Dukes (OHL)
8	Richard Matvichuk (D)	Canada	Minnesota North Stars	Saskatoon Blades (WHL)
9	Patrick Poulin (LW)	Canada	Hartford Whalers	Saint-Hyacinthe Laser (QMJHL)
10	Martin Lapointe (RW)	Canada	Detroit Red Wings	Laval Titan (QMJHL)
11	Brian Rolston (RW)	United States	New Jersey Devils	Detroit Compuware Ambassadors (NAHL)
12	Tyler Wright (C)	Canada	Edmonton Oilers	Swift Current Broncos (WHL)
13	Philippe Boucher (D)	Canada	Buffalo Sabres	Granby Bisons (QMJHL)
14	Pat Peake (C)	United States	Washington Capitals	Detroit Compuware Ambassadors (OHL)
15	Alexei Kovalev (RW)	Soviet Union	New York Rangers	Dynamo Moscow (USSR)
16	Markus Naslund (LW)	Sweden	Pittsburgh Penguins	Modo Hockey (Sweden)
17	Brent Bilodeau (D)	United States	Montreal Canadiens	Seattle Thunderbirds (WHL)
18	Glen Murray (RW)	Canada	Boston Bruins	Sudbury Wolves (OHL)
19	Niklas Sundblad (RW)	Sweden	Calgary Flames	AIK IF (Sweden)
20	Martin Rucinsky (RW)	Czechoslovakia	Edmonton Oilers (from Los Angeles)^{2}	HC CHZ Litvinov (Czechoslovakia)
21	Trevor Halverson (RW)	Canada	Washington Capitals (from St. Louis)^{3}	North Bay Centennials (OHL)
22	Dean McAmmond (C)	Canada	Chicago Blackhawks	Prince Albert Raiders (WHL)
^{Reference:}

1. Toronto's first-round pick went to New Jersey as the result of a trade on October 16, 1989, that sent Tom Kurvers to Toronto in exchange for this pick.
2. Los Angeles' first-round pick went to Edmonton as the result of a trade on August 9, 1988, that sent Wayne Gretzky, Mike Krushelnyski and Marty McSorley to Los Angeles in exchange for Jimmy Carson, Martin Gelinas, cash, Los Angeles' first-round pick in the 1989 entry draft, first-round pick in the 1993 entry draft and this pick.
3. Washington acquired this pick with first-round picks in the 1992 entry draft, 1993 entry draft, 1994 entry draft and 1995 entry draft as compensation on July 16, 1990, after St. Louis signed free agent Scott Stevens.

=== Round two ===
#	Player	Nationality	NHL team	College/junior/club team
23	Ray Whitney (LW)	Canada	San Jose Sharks	Spokane Chiefs (WHL)
24	Rene Corbet (LW)	Canada	Quebec Nordiques	Drummondville Voltigeurs (QMJHL)
25	Eric Lavigne (D)	Canada	Washington Capitals (from Toronto via Quebec)^{1}	Hull Olympiques (QMJHL)
26	Zigmund Palffy (RW)	Czechoslovakia	New York Islanders	HK Nitra (Czechoslovakia)
27	Steve Staios (D)	Canada	St. Louis Blues (from Winnipeg)^{2}	Niagara Falls Thunder (OHL)
28	Jim Campbell (RW)	United States	Montreal Canadiens (from Philadelphia)^{3}	Northwood School (USHS–NY)
29	Jassen Cullimore (D)	Canada	Vancouver Canucks	Peterborough Petes (OHL)
30	Sandis Ozolinsh (D)	Latvia	San Jose Sharks (from Minnesota)^{4}	Dinamo Riga (USSR)
31	Martin Hamrlik (D)	Czechoslovakia	Hartford Whalers	AC ZPS Zlin (Czechoslovakia)
32	Jamie Pushor (D)	Canada	Detroit Red Wings	Lethbridge Hurricanes (WHL)
33	Donevan Hextall (LW)	Canada	New Jersey Devils	Prince Albert Raiders (WHL)
34	Andrew Verner (G)	Canada	Edmonton Oilers	Peterborough Petes (OHL)
35	Jason Dawe (RW)	Canada	Buffalo Sabres	Peterborough Petes (OHL)
36	Jeff Nelson (C)	Canada	Washington Capitals	Prince Albert Raiders (WHL)
37	Darcy Werenka (D)	Canada	New York Rangers	Lethbridge Hurricanes (WHL)
38	Rusty Fitzgerald (C)	United States	Pittsburgh Penguins	East High School (USHS–MN)
39	Mike Pomichter (C)	United States	Chicago Blackhawks (from Montreal)^{5}	Springfield Olympics (NEJHL)
40	Jozef Stumpel (C)	Czechoslovakia	Boston Bruins	HK Nitra (Czechoslovakia)
41	Francois Groleau (D)	Canada	Calgary Flames	Shawinigan Cataractes (QMJHL)
42	Guy Leveque (C)	Canada	Los Angeles Kings	Cornwall Royals (OHL)
43	Craig Darby (C)	United States	Montreal Canadiens (from St. Louis via Vancouver)^{6}	Albany Academy (USHS–NY)
44	Jamie Matthews (C)	Canada	Chicago Blackhawks	Sudbury Wolves (OHL)
^{Reference:}

1. Quebec's second-round pick went to Washington as the result of a trade on June 22, 1991, that sent Mikhail Tatarinov to Quebec in exchange for this pick.
  Quebec previously acquired this pick as the result of a trade on November 17, 1990, that sent Aaron Broten, Lucien DeBlois and Michel Petit to Toronto in exchange for Scott Pearson, Toronto's second-round pick in the 1992 entry draft and this pick.
2. Winnipeg's' second-round pick went to St. Louis as the result of a trade on June 17, 1989, that sent Greg Paslawski and St. Louis's third-round pick in 1989 entry draft to Winnipeg in exchange for Winnipeg's third-round pick in 1989 entry draft and this pick.
3. Philadelphia's' second-round pick went to Montreal as the result of a trade on March 5, 1991, that sent Mark Pederson to Philadelphia in exchange for this pick.
4. Minnesota's' second-round pick went to San Jose as the result of a trade on May 31, 1991, that sent future considerations (San Jose's promised to Minnesota not to draft Mike Craig in the 1991 NHL dispersal draft) to Minnesota in exchange for Minnesota's first-round pick in the 1992 entry draft and this pick.
5. Montreal's' second-round pick went to Chicago as the result of a trade on June 29, 1990, that sent Denis Savard to Montreal in exchange for Chris Chelios and this pick.
6. Vancouver's second-round pick went to Montreal as the result of a trade on March 6, 1990, that sent Jyrki Lumme to Vancouver in exchange for this pick.
  Vancouver previously acquired this pick as the result of a trade with St. Louis on March 6, 1990, that sent that sent Harold Snepsts, Rich Sutter and Vancouver's second-round pick in the 1990 entry draft to St. Louis in exchange for Adrien Plavsic, St. Louis' first-round pick in the 1990 entry draft and this pick.

=== Round three ===
#	Player	Nationality	NHL team	College/junior/club team
45	Dody Wood (C)	Canada	San Jose Sharks	Seattle Thunderbirds (WHL)
46	Rich Brennan (D)	United States	Quebec Nordiques	Tabor Academy (USHS–MA)
47	Yanic Perreault (C)	Canada	Toronto Maple Leafs	Trois-Rivieres Draveurs (QMJHL)
48	Jamie McLennan (G)	Canada	New York Islanders	Lethbridge Hurricanes (WHL)
49	Dmitri Filimonov (D)	Soviet Union	Winnipeg Jets	Dynamo Moscow (USSR)
50	Yanick Dupre (LW)	Canada	Philadelphia Flyers	Drummondville Voltigeurs (QMJHL)
51	Sean Pronger (C)	Canada	Vancouver Canucks	Bowling Green State University (CCHA)
52	Sandy McCarthy (RW)	Canada	Calgary Flames (from Minnesota)^{1}	Laval Titan (QMJHL)
53	Todd Hall (D)	United States	Hartford Whalers	Hamden High School (USHS–CT)
54	Chris Osgood (G)	Canada	Detroit Red Wings	Medicine Hat Tigers (WHL)
55	Fredrik Bremberg (RW)	Sweden	New Jersey Devils	Djurgardens IF (Sweden)
56	George Breen (RW)	United States	Edmonton Oilers	Cushing Academy (USHS–MA)
57	Jason Young (LW)	Canada	Buffalo Sabres	Sudbury Wolves (OHL)
58	Steve Konowalchuk (LW)	United States	Washington Capitals	Portland Winter Hawks (WHL)
59	Michael Nylander (C)	Sweden	Hartford Whalers (from the Rangers)^{2}	Huddinge IK (Sweden)
60	Shane Peacock (D)	Canada	Pittsburgh Penguins	Lethbridge Hurricanes (WHL)
61	Yves Sarault (LW)	Canada	Montreal Canadiens	Saint-Jean Lynx (QMJHL)
62	Marcel Cousineau (G)	Canada	Boston Bruins	Beauport Harfangs (QMJHL)
63	Brian Caruso (LW)	Canada	Calgary Flames	University of Minnesota Duluth (WCHA)
64	Kyle Reeves (RW)	Canada	St. Louis Blues (from Los Angeles)^{3}	Tri-City Americans (WHL)
65	Nathan LaFayette (C)	Canada	St. Louis Blues (from St. Louis via Montreal)^{4}	Cornwall Royals (OHL)
66	Bobby House (RW)	Canada	Chicago Blackhawks	Brandon Wheat Kings (WHL)
^{Reference:}

1. Minnesota's third-round pick went to Calgary as the result of a trade on March 5, 1991, that sent Marc Bureau to Minnesota in exchange for this pick.
2. The Rangers' third-round pick went to Hartford as the result of a trade on July 7, 1990, that sent Jody Hull to the Rangers in exchange for Carey Wilson and this pick.
3. Los Angeles' third-round pick went to St. Louis as the result of a trade on November 10, 1989, that sent Brian Benning to Los Angeles in exchange for this pick.
4. St. Louis' third-round pick was re-acquired as the result of a trade on December 12, 1989, that sent Todd Ewen to Montreal in exchange for future considerations (this pick).
  Montreal previously acquired this pick as the result of a trade with St. Louis on January 16, 1989, that sent that sent Mike Lalor and Montreal's 1st-rd pick in the 1990 entry draft in exchange for St. Louis' 1st-rd pick - 1990 entry draft and this pick.

=== Round four ===
#	Player	Nationality	NHL team	College/junior/club team
67	Kerry Toporowski (D)	Canada	San Jose Sharks	Spokane Chiefs (WHL)
68	Dave Karpa (D)	Canada	Quebec Nordiques	Ferris State University (NCAA)
69	Terry Chitaroni (C)	Canada	Toronto Maple Leafs	Trois-Rivieres Draveurs (QMJHL)
70	Milan Hnilicka (G)	Czechoslovakia	New York Islanders	Poldi SONP Kladno (Czechoslovakia)
71	Igor Kravchuk (D)	Soviet Union	Chicago Blackhawks (from Winnipeg)^{1}	CSKA Moscow (USSR)
72	Peter Ambroziak (LW)	Canada	Buffalo Sabres (from Philadelphia)^{2}	Ottawa 67's (OHL)
73	Vladimir Vujtek (LW)	Czechoslovakia	Montreal Canadiens (from Vancouver)^{3}	Tri-City Americans (WHL)
74	Mike Torchia (G)	Canada	Minnesota North Stars	Kitchener Rangers (OHL)
75	Jim Storm (LW)	United States	Hartford Whalers	Michigan Technological University (WCHA)
76	Mike Knuble (RW)	United States	Detroit Red Wings	Kalamazoo Wings (IHL)
77	Brad Willner (D)	United States	New Jersey Devils	Richfield High School (USHS–MN)
78	Mario Nobili (LW)	Canada	Edmonton Oilers	Longueuil College Francais (QPJHL)
79	Keith Redmond (LW)	Canada	Los Angeles Kings (from Buffalo)^{4}	Bowling Green University (CCHA)
80	Justin Morrison (C)	Canada	Washington Capitals	Kingston Frontenacs (OHL)
81	Alexei Zhitnik (D)	Soviet Union	Los Angeles Kings (from the Rangers via Minnesota)^{5}	Sokil Kyiv (USSR)
82	Joe Tamminen (C)	United States	Pittsburgh Penguins	Virginia High School (USHS–MN)
83	Sylvain LaPointe (D)	Canada	Montreal Canadiens	Clarkson University (ECAC)
84	Brad Tiley (D)	Canada	Boston Bruins	Sault Ste. Marie Greyhounds (OHL)
85	Steve Magnusson (C)	United States	Calgary Flames	Anoka High School (USHS–MN)
86	Aris Brimanis (D)	United States	Philadelphia Flyers (from Los Angeles)^{6}	Bowling Green University (CCHA)
87	Grayden Reid (C)	Canada	St. Louis Blues	Owen Sound Platers (OHL)
88	Zac Boyer (RW)	Canada	Chicago Blackhawks	Kamloops Blazers (WHL)
^{Reference:}

1. Winnipeg's fourth-round pick went to Chicago as the result of a trade on December 14, 1990, that sent Mike Eagles to Winnipeg in exchange for this pick.
2. Philadelphia's fourth-round pick went to Buffalo as the result of a trade on March 5, 1990, that sent Kevin Maguire and Buffalo's second-round pick in the 1990 entry draft to Philadelphia in exchange for Jay Wells and this pick.
3. Vancouver's fourth-round pick went to Montreal as the result of a trade on January 12, 1990, that sent Gerald Diduck to Vancouver in exchange for this pick.
4. Buffalo's fourth-round pick went to Los Angeles as the result of a trade on October 4, 1989, that sent Dean Kennedy to Buffalo in exchange for this pick.
5. Minnesota's fourth-round pick went to Los Angeles as the result of a trade on June 22, 1991, that sent Todd Elik to Minnesota in exchange for Randy Gilhen, Charlie Huddy, Jim Thomson and this pick.
  Minnesota previously acquired this pick as the result of a trade on March 6, 1990, that sent Mike Gartner to the Rangers in exchange for Ulf Dahlen, the Rangers' fourth-round pick in the 1990 entry draft and future considerations (this pick).
6. Los Angeles' fourth-round pick went to Philadelphia as the result of a trade on May 30, 1991, that sent Jeff Chychrun and Jari Kurri to Los Angeles in exchange for Steve Duchesne, Steve Kasper and this pick.

=== Round five ===
#	Player	Nationality	NHL team	College/junior/club team
89	Dan Ryder (G)	Canada	San Jose Sharks	Sudbury Wolves (OHL)
90	Patrick Labrecque (G)	Canada	Quebec Nordiques	Saint-Jean Lynx (QMJHL)
91	Juha Ylonen (C)	Finland	Winnipeg Jets (from Toronto via Philadelphia)^{1}	Kiekko-Espoo (Finland)
92	Steve Junker (RW)	Canada	New York Islanders	Spokane Chiefs (WHL)
93	Ryan Haggerty (C)	United States	Edmonton Oilers (from Winnipeg)^{2}	Westminster School (USHS–CT)
94	Yanick Degrace (G)	Canada	Philadelphia Flyers	Trois-Rivieres Draveurs (QMJHL)
95	Dan Kesa (RW)	Canada	Vancouver Canucks	Prince Albert Raiders (WHL)
96	Corey Machanic (D)	United States	New York Rangers	University of Vermont (ECAC)
97	Mike Kennedy (C)	Canada	Minnesota North Stars (from Hartford)^{3}	University of British Columbia (CIS)
98	Dmitri Motkov (D)	Soviet Union	Detroit Red Wings	CSKA Moscow (USSR)
99	Yan Kaminsky (LW)	Soviet Union	Winnipeg Jets (from New Jersey)^{4}	Dynamo Moscow (USSR)
100	Brad Layzell (D)	Canada	Montreal Canadiens (from Edmonton via Detroit)^{5}	Rensselaer Polytechnic Institute (ECAC)
101	Steve Shields (G)	Canada	Buffalo Sabres	University of Michigan (CCHA)
102	Alexei Kudashov (C)	Soviet Union	Toronto Maple Leafs (from Washington)^{6}	Krylya Sovetov (USSR)
103	Bill Lindsay (LW)	United States	Quebec Nordiques (from the Rangers)^{7}	Tri-City Americans (WHL)
104	Rob Melanson (D)	Canada	Pittsburgh Penguins	Hull Olympiques (QMJHL)
105	Tony Prpic (RW)	United States	Montreal Canadiens	Culver Military Academy (USHS–IN)
106	Mariusz Czerkawski (RW)	Poland	Boston Bruins	GKS Tychy (Poland)
107	Jerome Butler (G)	United States	Calgary Flames	Roseau High School (USHS–MN)
108	Pauli Jaks (G)	Switzerland	Los Angeles Kings	HC Ambri-Piotta (Switzerland)
109	Jeff Callinan (G)	United States	St. Louis Blues	University of Minnesota (CCHA)
110	Maco Balkovec (D)	Canada	Chicago Blackhawks	Merritt Centennials (BCHL)
^{Reference:}

1. Philadelphia's fifth-round pick went to Winnipeg as the result of a trade on October 3, 1989, that sent Keith Acton and Pete Peeters to Philadelphia in exchange for future considerations and this pick.
  Philadelphia previously acquired this pick as the result of a trade on September 8, 1989, that sent Mark Laforest to Toronto in exchange for Toronto's seventh-round pick in the 1991 Entry Draft and this pick.
2. Winnipeg's fifth-round pick went to Edmonton as the result of a trade on June 12, 1991, that sent John LeBlanc and Edmonton's tenth-round pick in the 1992 entry draft to Winnipeg in exchange for this pick.
3. Hartford's fifth-round pick went to Minnesota as the result of a trade on June 22, 1991, that sent future considerations (rights to Jukka Suomalainen) to Hartford in exchange for this pick.
4. New Jersey's fifth-round pick went to Winnipeg as compensation after a trade on September 6, 1990, that sent Laurie Boschman to New Jersey in exchange for Bob Brooke. However, Bob Brooke refused to report to Winnipeg and retired from hockey. The trade was changed to this pick.
5. Detroit's fifth-round pick went to Montreal as the result of a trade on June 15, 1990, that sent Rick Green to Detroit in exchange for this pick.
  Detroit previously acquired this pick as the result of a trade on November 2, 1989, that sent Adam Graves, Petr Klima, Joe Murphy and Jeff Sharples to Edmonton in exchange for Jimmy Carson, Kevin McClelland and this pick.
6. Washington's fifth-round pick went to Toronto as the result of a trade on January 24, 1991, that sent Paul Fenton and John Kordic to Washington in exchange for this pick.
7. The Rangers' fifth-round pick went to Quebec as the result of a trade on January 17, 1991, that sent Joe Cirella to the Rangers in exchange for Aaron Miller and this pick.

=== Round six ===
#	Player	Nationality	NHL team	College/junior/club team
111	Fredrik Nilsson (C)	Sweden	San Jose Sharks	VIK Vasteras HK (Sweden)
112	Kevin St. Jacques (LW)	Canada	Chicago Blackhawks	Lethbridge Hurricanes (WHL)
113	Jeff Perry (LW)	Canada	Toronto Maple Leafs	Owen Sound Platers (OHL)
114	Rob Valicevic (RW)	United States	New York Islanders	Detroit Compuware Ambassadors (SOJHL)
115	Jeff Sebastian (D)	Canada	Winnipeg Jets	Seattle Thunderbirds (WHL)
116	Clayton Norris (RW)	Canada	Philadelphia Flyers	Medicine Hat Tigers (WHL)
117	Evgeny Namestnikov (D)	Soviet Union	Vancouver Canucks	Torpedo Nizhny Novgorod (Russia)
118	Mark Lawrence (RW)	Canada	Minnesota North Stars	Detroit Junior Red Wings (OHL)
119	Mike Harding (RW)	Canada	Hartford Whalers	Northern Michigan University (WCHA)
120	Alexander Kuzminski (C)	Soviet Union	Toronto Maple Leafs (from Detroit)^{1}	Sokil Kyiv (USSR)
121	Curtis Regnier (D)	Canada	New Jersey Devils	Prince Albert Raiders (WHL)
122	Dmitri Yushkevich (D)	Soviet Union	Philadelphia Flyers (from Edmonton)^{2}	Torpedo Yaroslavl
123	Sean O'Donnell (D)	Canada	Buffalo Sabres	Sudbury Wolves (OHL)
124	Brian Holzinger (C)	United States	Buffalo Sabres (from Washington)^{3}	Detroit Compuware Ambassadors (SOJHL)
125	Fredrik Jax (RW)	Sweden	New York Rangers	Leksands IF (Sweden)
126	Brian Clifford (C)	United States	Pittsburgh Penguins	Nichols School (USHS-NY)
127	Oleg Petrov (RW)	Soviet Union	Montreal Canadiens	CSKA Moscow (USSR)
128	Barry Young (D)	Canada	New York Rangers	Sudbury Wolves (OHL)
129	Bob Marshall (D)	Canada	Calgary Flames	Miami University (CCHA)
130	Brett Seguin (C)	United States	Los Angeles Kings	Ottawa 67's (OHL)
131	Bruce Gardiner (RW)	Canada	St. Louis Blues	Colgate University (ECAC)
132	Jacques Auger (D)	Canada	Chicago Blackhawks	University of Wisconsin (WCHA)
^{Reference:}

1. Detroit's sixth-round pick went to Toronto as the result of a trade on March 5, 1991, that sent Allan Bester to Detroit in exchange for this pick.
2. Edmonton's sixth-round pick went to Philadelphia as the result of a trade on February 7, 1989, that sent Dave Brown to Edmonton in exchange for Keith Acton and this pick.
3. Washington's sixth-round pick went to Buffalo as the result of a trade on March 6, 1989, that sent Calle Johansson and Buffalo's second-round picks in 1989 to Washington in exchange for Grant Ledyard, Clint Malarchuk and this pick.

=== Round seven ===
#	Player	Nationality	NHL team	College/junior/club team
133	Jaroslav Otevrel (C)	Czechoslovakia	San Jose Sharks	AC ZPS Zlin (Czechoslovakia)
134	Mikael Johansson (C)	Sweden	Quebec Nordiques	Djurgardens IF (Sweden)
135	Martin Prochazka (RW)	Czechoslovakia	Toronto Maple Leafs	Poldi SONP Kladno (Czechoslovakia)
136	Andreas Johansson (LW)	Sweden	New York Islanders	Falu IF (Sweden)
137	Geoff Finch (G)	Canada	Minnesota North Stars (from Winnipeg)^{1}	Brown University (ECAC)
138	Andrei Lomakin (LW)	Soviet Union	Philadelphia Flyers (from Philadelphia via Toronto)^{2}	Dynamo Moscow (USSR)
139	Brent Thurston (LW)	Canada	Vancouver Canucks	Spokane Chiefs (WHL)
140	Matt Hoffman (LW)	United States	Calgary Flames (from Minnesota)^{3}	Oshawa Generals (OHL)
141	Brian Mueller (D)	United States	Hartford Whalers	South Kent School (USHS–CT)
142	Igor Malykhin (D)	Soviet Union	Detroit Red Wings	CSKA Moscow (USSR)
143	Dave Craievich (D)	Canada	New Jersey Devils	Oshawa Generals (OHL)
144	David Oliver (RW)	Canada	Edmonton Oilers	University of Michigan (CCHA)
145	Chris Snell (D)	Canada	Buffalo Sabres	Ottawa 67's (OHL)
146	Dave Morissette (LW)	Canada	Washington Capitals	Shawinigan Cataractes (QMJHL)
147	John Rushin (C)	United States	New York Rangers	Bloomington Kennedy High School (USHS–MN)
148	Ed Patterson (RW)	Canada	Pittsburgh Penguins	Kamloops Blazers (WHL)
149	Brady Kramer (C)	United States	Montreal Canadiens	Haverford High School (USHS–PA)
150	Gary Golczewski (LW)	United States	Boston Bruins	Trinity-Pawling School (USHS–NY)
151	Kelly Harper (C)	Canada	Calgary Flames	Michigan State University (CCHA)
152	Kelly Fairchild (C)	United States	Los Angeles Kings	Grand Rapids High School (USHS–MN)
153	Terry Hollinger (D)	Canada	St. Louis Blues	Lethbridge Hurricanes (WHL)
154	Scott Kirton (RW)	Canada	Chicago Blackhawks	Powell River Paper Kings (BCHL)
^{Reference:}

1. Winnipeg's seventh-round pick went to Minnesota as the result of a trade on May 30, 1991, that sent Rob Murray and future considerations to Winnipeg in exchange for this pick.
2. Philadelphia's seventh-round pick was re-acquired as the result of a trade on September 8, 1989, that sent Mark Laforest to Toronto in exchange for Toronto's sixth-round pick in the 1991 Entry Draft (later upgraded to a fifth- round) and this pick.
  Toronto previously acquired this pick as the result of a trade on August 28, 1989, that sent the rights to Jiri Latal to Philadelphia in exchange for this pick.
3. Minnesota's seventh-round pick went to Calgary as the result of a trade on May 30, 1991, that sent Steve Guenette to Minnesota in exchange for this pick.

=== Round eight ===
#	Player	Nationality	NHL team	College/junior/club team
155	Dean Grillo (RW)	United States	San Jose Sharks	Warroad High School (USHS–MN)
156	Janne Laukkanen (D)	Finland	Quebec Nordiques	Hockey Reipas (Finland)
157	Aaron Asp (C)	Canada	Quebec Nordiques	Ferris State University (CCHA)
158	Todd Sparks (LW)	Canada	New York Islanders	Hull Olympiques (QMJHL)
159	Jeff Ricciardi (D)	Canada	Winnipeg Jets	Ottawa 67's (OHL)
160	Dmitri Mironov (D)	Soviet Union	Toronto Maple Leafs (from Philadelphia)^{1}	Krylya Sovetov (USSR)
161	Eric Johnson (RW)	United States	Vancouver Canucks	Robbinsdale Armstrong High School (USHS–MN)
162	Jiri Kuntos (D)	Czechoslovakia	Buffalo Sabres (from Minnesota)^{2}	Dukla Jihlava (Czechoslovakia)
163	Steven Yule (D)	Canada	Hartford Whalers	Kamloops Blazers (WHL)
164	Robb McIntyre (LW)	United States	Toronto Maple Leafs (from Detroit)^{3}	Dubuque Fighting Saints (USHL)
165	Paul Wolanski (D)	Canada	New Jersey Devils	Niagara Falls Thunder (OHL)
166	Gary Kitching (C)	Canada	Edmonton Oilers	Thunder Bay Flyers (USHL)
167	Tomas Kucharcik (C)	Czechoslovakia	Toronto Maple Leafs (from Buffalo)^{4}	Dukla Jihlava (Czechoslovakia)
168	Rick Corriveau (D)	Canada	Washington Capitals	London Knights (OHL)
169	Corey Hirsch (G)	Canada	New York Rangers	Kamloops Blazers (WHL)
170	Peter McLaughlin (D)	United States	Pittsburgh Penguins	Belmont Hill School (USHS–MA)
171	Brian Savage (LW)	Canada	Montreal Canadiens	Miami University (CCHA)
172	Jay Moser (D)	United States	Boston Bruins	Park High School (USHS–MN)
173	David St. Pierre (C)	Canada	Calgary Flames	Longueuil College Francais (QPJHL)
174	Michael Burkett (LW)	Canada	Minnesota North Stars (from Los Angeles)^{5}	Michigan State University (CCHA)
175	Chris Kenady (RW)	United States	St. Louis Blues	St. Paul Vulcans (USHL)
176	Roch Belley (G)	Canada	Chicago Blackhawks	Niagara Falls Thunder (OHL)
^{Reference:}

1. Philadelphia's eighth-round pick went to Toronto as the result of a trade on June 16, 1990, that sent Toronto's third-round pick in the 1990 entry draft to Philadelphia in exchange for Kevin Maguire and this pick.
2. Minnesota's eighth-round pick went to Buffalo as the result of a trade on May 26, 1991, that sent Darcy Wakaluk to Minnesota in exchange for Buffalo's fifth-round pick in the 1992 entry draft and this pick.
3. Detroit's eighth-round pick went to Toronto as the result of a trade on February 4, 1991, that sent Brad Marsh to Detroit in exchange for this pick.
4. Buffalo's eighth-round pick went to Toronto as the result of a trade on December 17, 1990, that sent Brian Curran and Lou Franceschetti to Buffalo in exchange for Mike Foligno and this pick.
5. Los Angeles' eighth-round pick went to Minnesota as the result of a trade on March 5, 1991, that sent Ilkka Sinisalo to Los Angeles in exchange for this pick.

=== Round nine ===
#	Player	Nationality	NHL team	College/junior/club team
177	Corwin Saurdiff (G)	United States	San Jose Sharks	Waterloo Black Hawks (USHL)
178	Adam Bartell (D)	United States	Quebec Nordiques	Niagara Falls Canucks (GHJHL)
179	Guy Lehoux (D)	Canada	Toronto Maple Leafs	Drummondville Voltigeurs (QMJHL)
180	John Johnson (C)	Canada	New York Islanders	Niagara Falls Thunder (OHL)
181	Sean Gauthier (G)	Canada	Winnipeg Jets	Kingston Frontenacs (OHL)
182	Jim Bode (RW)	United States	Philadelphia Flyers	Robbinsdale Armstrong High School (USHS–MN)
183	David Neilson (LW)	United States	Vancouver Canucks	Prince Albert Raiders (WHL)
184	Derek Herlofsky (G)	United States	Minnesota North Stars	St. Paul Vulcans (USHL)
185	Chris Belanger (D)	Canada	Hartford Whalers	Western Michigan University (CCHA)
186	Jim Bermingham (C)	Canada	Detroit Red Wings	Laval Titan (QMJHL)
187	Dan Reimann (D)	United States	New Jersey Devils	Anoka High School (USHS–MN)
188	Brent Brekke (D)	United States	Quebec Nordiques (from Edmonton)^{1}	Western Michigan University (CCHA)
189	Tony Iob (LW)	Canada	Buffalo Sabres	Sault Ste Marie Greyhounds (OHL)
190	Trevor Duhaime (RW)	Canada	Washington Capitals	Saint-Jean Lynx (QMJHL)
191	Vyacheslav Uvayev (D)	Soviet Union	New York Rangers	Spartak Moscow (USSR)
192	Jeff Lembke (G)	United States	Pittsburgh Penguins	Omaha Lancers (USHL)
193	Scott Fraser (RW)	Canada	Montreal Canadiens	Dartmouth College (ECAC)
194	Dan Hodge (D)	United States	Boston Bruins	Merrimack College (Hockey East)
195	David Struch (C)	Canada	Calgary Flames	Saskatoon Blades (WHL)
196	Craig Brown (G)	Canada	Los Angeles Kings	Western Michigan University (CCHA)
197	Jed Fiebelkorn (RW)	United States	St. Louis Blues	Osseo High School (USHS–MN)
198	Scott MacDonald (D)	United States	Chicago Blackhawks	Choate Rosemary Hall (USHS–CT)
^{Reference:}

1. Edmonton's ninth-round pick went to Quebec as the result of a trade on November 10, 1990, that sent Max Middendorf to Edmonton in exchange for this pick.

=== Round ten ===
#	Player	Nationality	NHL team	College/junior/club team
199	Dale Craigwell (C)	Canada	San Jose Sharks	Oshawa Generals (OHL)
200	Paul Koch (D)	United States	Quebec Nordiques	Omaha Lancers (USHL)
201	Gary Miller (D)	Canada	Toronto Maple Leafs	North Bay Centennials (OHL)
202	Rob Canavan (LW)	United States	New York Islanders	Hingham High School (USHS–MA)
203	Igor Ulanov (D)	Soviet Union	Winnipeg Jets	Khimik Voskresensk (USSR)
204	Josh Bartell (D)	United States	Philadelphia Flyers	Rome Free Academy (USHS–NY)
205	Brad Barton (D)	Canada	Vancouver Canucks	Kitchener Rangers (OHL)
206	Tom Nemeth (LW)	Canada	Minnesota North Stars	Cornwall Royals (OHL)
207	Jason Currie (G)	Canada	Hartford Whalers	Clarkson University (ECAC)
208	Jason Firth (C)	Canada	Detroit Red Wings	Kitchener Rangers (OHL)
209	Rob Leask (D)	Canada	Washington Capitals (from New Jersey)^{1}	Hamilton Red Wings (GHJHL)
210	Vegar Barlie (RW)	Norway	Edmonton Oilers	Valerenga (Norway)
211	Spencer Meany (RW)	Canada	Buffalo Sabres	St. Lawrence University (ECAC)
212	Carl LeBlanc (D)	Canada	Washington Capitals	Granby Bisons (QMJHL)
213	Jamie Ram (G)	Canada	New York Rangers	Michigan Technological University (WCHA)
214	Chris Tok (D)	United States	Pittsburgh Penguins	Greenway High School (USHS–MN)
215	Greg MacEachern (D)	Canada	Montreal Canadiens	Laval College Francais (QMJHL)
216	Steve Norton (D)	Canada	Boston Bruins	Michigan State University (CCHA)
217	Sergei Zolotov (LW)	Soviet Union	Calgary Flames	Krylya Sovetov (USSR)
218	Mattias Olsson (D)	Sweden	Los Angeles Kings	Farjestad BK (Sweden)
219	Chris MacKenzie (LW)	Canada	St. Louis Blues	Colgate University (ECAC)
220	Alexander Andrievsky (RW)	Soviet Union	Chicago Blackhawks	Dynamo Moscow (NCAA)
^{Reference:}

1. New Jersey's tenth-round pick went to Washington as the result of a trade on June 19, 1989, that sent Peter Sundstrom to New Jersey in exchange for this pick.

=== Round eleven ===
#	Player	Nationality	NHL team	College/junior/club team
221	Aaron Kriss (D)	United States	San Jose Sharks	Cranbrook School (USHS–MI)
222	Doug Friedman (LW)	United States	Quebec Nordiques	Boston University (Hockey East)
223	Jonathan Kelley (C)	United States	Toronto Maple Leafs	Arlington Catholic High School (USHS–MA)
224	Marcus Thuresson (C)	Sweden	New York Islanders	Leksands IF (Sweden)
225	Jason Jennings (RW)	Canada	Winnipeg Jets	Western Michigan University (CCHA)
226	Neil Little (G)	Canada	Philadelphia Flyers	Rensselaer Polytechnic Institute (ECAC)
227	Jason Fitzsimmons (G)	Canada	Vancouver Canucks	Moose Jaw Warriors (WHL)
228	Shayne Green (RW)	Canada	Minnesota North Stars	Kamloops Blazers (WHL)
229	Mike Santonelli (C)	United States	Hartford Whalers	Matignon High School (USHS–MA)
230	Bart Turner (LW)	United States	Detroit Red Wings	Michigan State University (CCHA)
231	Kevin Riehl (C)	Canada	New Jersey Devils	Medicine Hat Tigers (WHL)
232	Yevgeni Belosheikin (G)	Soviet Union	Edmonton Oilers	CSKA Moscow (USSR)
233	Mikhail Volkov (RW)	Soviet Union	Buffalo Sabres	Krylya Sovetov (USSR)
234	Rob Puchniak (D)	Canada	Washington Capitals	Lethbridge Hurricanes (WHL)
235	Vitali Chinakhov (C)	Soviet Union	New York Rangers	Torpedo Yaroslavl (USSR)
236	Paul Dyck (D)	Canada	Pittsburgh Penguins	Moose Jaw Warriors (WHL)
237	P. J. Lepler (D)	United States	Montreal Canadiens	Rochester Mustangs (USHL)
238	Steve Lombardi (C)	United States	Boston Bruins	Deerfield Academy (USHS–MA)
239	Marko Jantunen (C)	Finland	Calgary Flames	Hockey Reipas (Finland)
240	Andre Boulianne (G)	Canada	Los Angeles Kings	Longueuil College Francais (QPJHL)
241	Kevin Rappana (D)	United States	St. Louis Blues	Duluth East High (USHS–MN)
242	Mike Larkin (D)	United States	Chicago Blackhawks	Rice Memorial High School (USHS–MA)
^{Reference:}

=== Round twelve ===
#	Player	Nationality	NHL team	College/junior/club team
243	Mikhail Kravets (LW)	Soviet Union	San Jose Sharks	SKA Leningrad (USSR)
244	Eric Meloche (RW)	Canada	Quebec Nordiques	Drummondville Voltigeurs (QMJHL)
245	Chris O'Rourke (D)	Canada	Toronto Maple Leafs	University of Alaska-Fairbanks (NCAA Independent)
246	Marty Schriner (C)	United States	New York Islanders	University of North Dakota (WCHA)
247	Sergei Sorokin (D)	Soviet Union	Winnipeg Jets	Dynamo Moscow (USSR)
248	John Parco (C)	Canada	Philadelphia Flyers	Belleville Bulls (OHL)
249	Xavier Majic (C)	Canada	Vancouver Canucks	Rensselaer Polytechnic Institute (ECAC)
250	Jukka Suomalainen (D)	Finland	Minnesota North Stars	Grankulla IFK (Finland)
251	Rob Peters (D)	United States	Hartford Whalers	Ohio State Buckeyes (CCHA)
252	Andrew Miller (RW)	Canada	Detroit Red Wings	Wexford Raiders (OJHL)
253	Jason Hehr (D)	Canada	New Jersey Devils	Kelowna Spartans (BCHL)
254	Juha Riihijarvi (RW)	Finland	Edmonton Oilers	Karpat (Finland)
255	Michael Smith (D)	Canada	Buffalo Sabres	Lake Superior State University (CCHA)
256	Bill Kovacs (LW)	Canada	Washington Capitals	Sudbury Wolves (OHL)
257	Brian Wiseman (C)	Canada	New York Rangers	University of Michigan (CCHA)
258	Pasi Huura (D)	Finland	Pittsburgh Penguins	Ilves (Finland)
259	Dale Hooper (D)	United States	Montreal Canadiens	Springfield Olympics (EJHL)
260	Torsten Kienass (D)	Germany	Boston Bruins	Dynamo Berlin (East Germany)
261	Andrei Trefilov (G)	Soviet Union	Calgary Flames	Dynamo Moscow (USSR)
262	Michael Gaul (D)	Canada	Los Angeles Kings	St. Lawrence University (ECAC)
263	Mike Veisor (G)	United States	St. Louis Blues	Springfield Olympics (EJHL)
264	Scott Dean (D)	United States	Chicago Blackhawks	Lake Forest High School (USHS–IL)
^{Reference:}

== Draftees based on nationality ==
Rank	Country	Amount
	North America	209
1	Canada	142
2	United States	67
	Europe	55
3	Soviet Union	24
4	Sweden	11
5	Czechoslovakia	10
6	Finland	6
7	Germany	1
7	Latvia	1
7	Norway	1
7	Poland	1
7	Switzerland	1

== See also ==
- 1991 NHL supplemental draft
- 1991 NHL dispersal and expansion drafts
- 1991–92 NHL season
- List of NHL players
