= Roman Hamrlík =

Czech ice hockey player (born 1974)

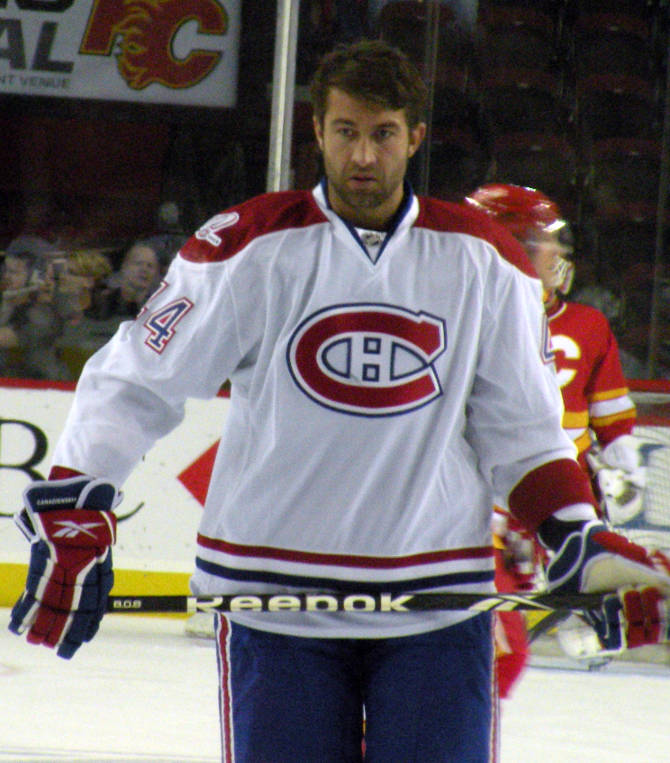
- Hamrlík with the Montreal Canadiens in 2009
- Born: April 12, 1974 (age 52) Gottwaldov, Czechoslovakia
- Height: 6 ft 2 in (188 cm)
- Weight: 223 lb (101 kg; 15 st 13 lb)
- Position: Defence
- Shot: Left
- Played for: ZPS Zlín; Tampa Bay Lightning; Edmonton Oilers; New York Islanders; Calgary Flames; Montreal Canadiens; Washington Capitals; New York Rangers
- National team: Czech Republic
- NHL draft: 1st overall, 1992; Tampa Bay Lightning
- Playing career: 1990–2013

Roman Hamrlík (born April 12, 1974) is a Czech former professional ice hockey defenceman who played 20 seasons in the National Hockey League (NHL). He was originally selected first overall in the 1992 NHL entry draft by the Tampa Bay Lightning, the first-ever selection by the expansion franchise, beginning his career with the team and later playing for the Edmonton Oilers, New York Islanders, Calgary Flames, Montreal Canadiens, Washington Capitals, and New York Rangers. In total, he played 1,395 games during his NHL career and participated in three NHL All-Star Games, in 1996, 1999, and 2003.

Hamrlík also represented the Czech Republic on numerous occasions at the international level, including at the 1998 Winter Olympics, where he was part of the gold medal-winning Czech team. He also played in the 2002 Winter Olympics, as well as two Ice Hockey World Championships, in 1994 and 2004, and two World Cup of Hockey tournaments, in 1996 and 2004 World Cup of Hockey.

== Playing career ==
Drafted first overall by the Tampa Bay Lightning in the 1992 NHL entry draft from ZPS Zlín, Hamrlík played as a defenceman who typically took on an offensive role for his team, especially on the powerplay. His offensive prowess earned him the role of the "powerplay quarterback," as he often led the offense in a powerplay. After his draft, Hamrlík made the immediate leap to North America to play for the Lightning in the 1992–93 season. In 1995–96, he posted career-highs in goals (16), assists (49) and points (65). After five-and-a-half seasons with the organization, Hamrlík was traded to the Edmonton Oilers midway through the 1997–98 season.

Hamrlík was traded to the New York Islanders on June 24, 2000, in exchange for Eric Brewer, Josh Green, and a 2000 second-round pick. During the 2000–01 season, he would match his career-high in goals with 16.

Hamrlík signed as an unrestricted free agent with the Calgary Flames on August 14, 2005, to a two-year, $7 million contract. In 2006–07, he posted a career-high in plus-minus with +22. On July 2, 2007, again as a free agent, Hamrlík signed a four-year, $22 million contract with the Montreal Canadiens.

After four productive seasons with Montreal, Hamrlík signed as a free agent on a two-year, $7 million contract with the Washington Capitals on July 1, 2011. In his second season with Washington during the lockout-shortened 2012–13 season, Hamrlik was limited to just four games as a reserve defenceman before he was ultimately placed on waivers by the team on March 5, 2013. He was claimed by the New York Rangers on March 6, 2013.

Hamrlík announced his retirement from professional ice hockey on October 21, 2013.

Hamrlík was inducted into the Czech Ice Hockey Hall of Fame on January 22, 2019.

== Personal life ==
Hamrlík has an older brother, Martin Hamrlík, who was drafted by the Hartford Whalers in 1991, but never played in the NHL, and who spent the majority of his playing career in Czech Republic before retiring in 2013.

Hamrlík and his wife Cynthia have two children together.

== Career statistics ==
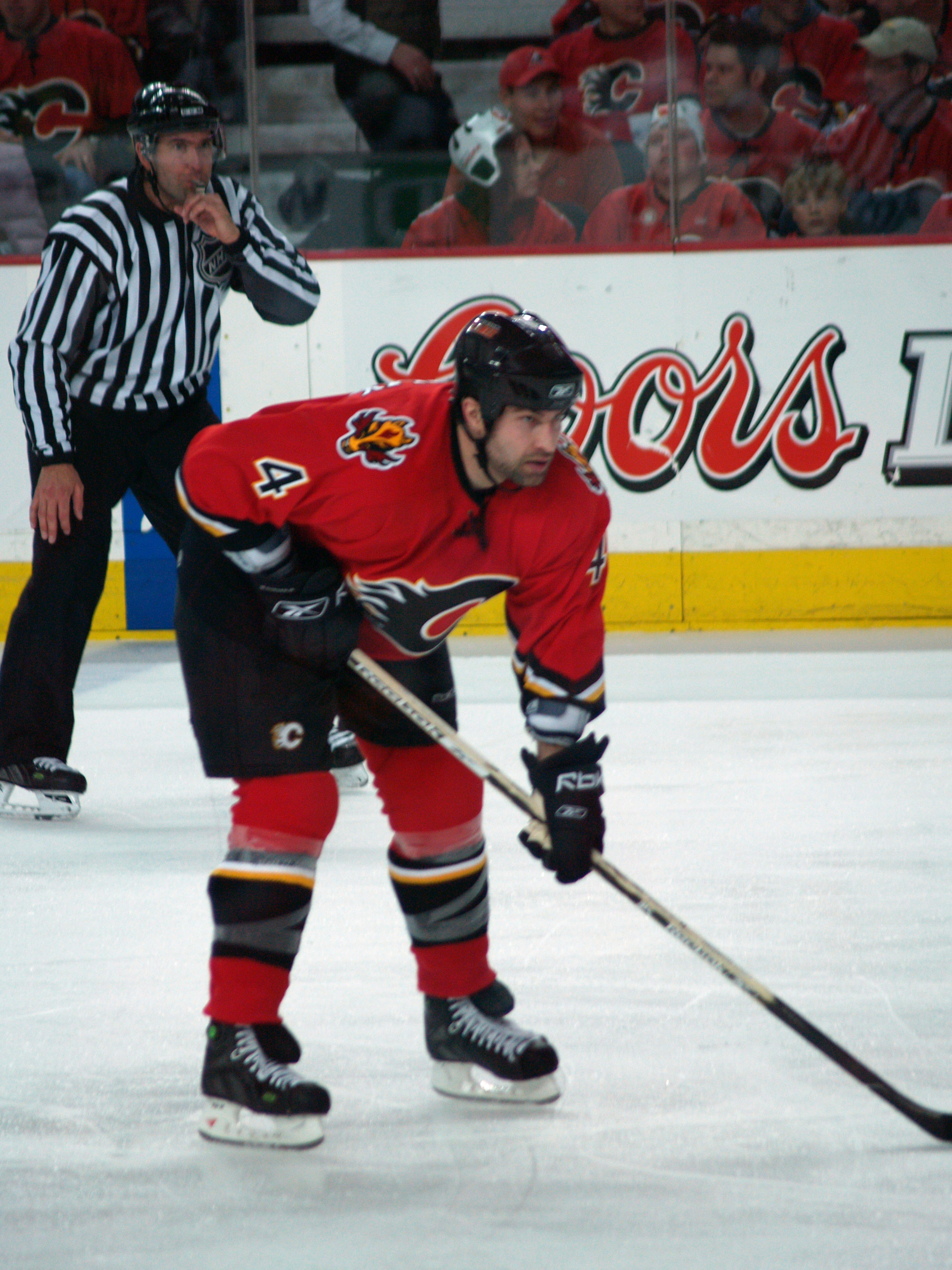
Hamrlík as a member of the Calgary Flames

=== Regular season and playoffs ===
			Regular season					Playoffs
Season	Team	League	GP	G	A	Pts	PIM	GP	G	A	Pts	PIM
1990–91	AC ZPS Zlín	CSSR	15	2	2	4	18	—	—	—	—	—
1991–92	AC ZPS Zlín	CSSR	34	5	5	10	50	—	—	—	—	—
1992–93	Atlanta Knights	IHL	2	1	1	2	2	—	—	—	—	—
1992–93	Tampa Bay Lightning	NHL	67	6	15	21	71	—	—	—	—	—
1993–94	Tampa Bay Lightning	NHL	64	3	18	21	135	—	—	—	—	—
1994–95	AC ZPS Zlín	CZE	2	1	0	1	10	—	—	—	—	—
1994–95	Tampa Bay Lightning	NHL	48	12	11	23	86	—	—	—	—	—
1995–96	Tampa Bay Lightning	NHL	82	16	49	65	103	5	0	1	1	4
1996–97	Tampa Bay Lightning	NHL	79	12	28	40	57	—	—	—	—	—
1997–98	Tampa Bay Lightning	NHL	37	3	12	15	22	—	—	—	—	—
1997–98	Edmonton Oilers	NHL	41	6	20	26	48	12	0	6	6	12
1998–99	Edmonton Oilers	NHL	75	8	24	32	70	3	0	0	0	2
1999–2000	HC Barum Continental Zlín	CZE	6	0	3	3	4	—	—	—	—	—
1999–2000	Edmonton Oilers	NHL	80	8	37	45	68	5	0	1	1	4
2000–01	New York Islanders	NHL	76	16	30	46	92	—	—	—	—	—
2001–02	New York Islanders	NHL	70	11	26	37	78	7	1	6	7	6
2002–03	New York Islanders	NHL	73	9	32	41	87	5	0	2	2	2
2003–04	New York Islanders	NHL	81	7	22	29	68	5	0	1	1	2
2004–05	HC Hamé Zlín	CZE	45	2	14	16	70	17	1	3	4	24
2005–06	Calgary Flames	NHL	51	7	19	26	56	7	0	2	2	2
2006–07	Calgary Flames	NHL	75	7	31	38	88	6	0	1	1	8
2007–08	Montreal Canadiens	NHL	77	5	21	26	38	12	1	2	3	8
2008–09	Montreal Canadiens	NHL	81	6	27	33	62	4	0	0	0	2
2009–10	Montreal Canadiens	NHL	75	6	20	26	56	19	0	9	9	15
2010–11	Montreal Canadiens	NHL	79	5	29	34	81	7	0	3	3	6
2011–12	Washington Capitals	NHL	68	2	11	13	34	14	1	3	4	12
2012–13	Washington Capitals	NHL	4	0	1	1	2	—	—	—	—	—
2012–13	New York Rangers	NHL	12	0	0	0	6	2	0	1	1	2
NHL totals			1,395	155	483	638	1,408	113	3	38	41	87

=== International ===
Medal record

Representing Czech Republic

Men's ice hockey

Olympic Games
Gold medal – first place	1998 Nagano	

Representing Czech Republic

European Junior Championships
Gold medal – first place	1991 Czechoslovakia	
Gold medal – first place	1992 Norway	

Year	Team	Event	GP	G	A	Pts	PIM
1991	Czechoslovakia	EJC	5	0	3	3	2
1992	Czechoslovakia	EJC	6	1	1	2	8
1992	Czechoslovakia	WJC	7	3	0	3	8
1994	Czech Republic	WC	1	0	0	0	2
1996	Czech Republic	WCH	3	0	0	0	4
1998	Czech Republic	OG	6	1	0	1	2
2002	Czech Republic	OG	4	0	1	1	2
2004	Czech Republic	WCH	4	0	2	2	0
2004	Czech Republic	WC	7	0	0	0	0
Junior totals			18	4	4	8	18
Senior totals			25	1	3	4	10

== Awards ==
- NHL All-Star Game – 1996, 1999, 2003

== See also ==
- List of NHL players with 1,000 games played

Preceded by Eric Lindros	NHL first overall draft pick 1992	Succeeded by Alexandre Daigle
Preceded by None	Tampa Bay Lightning first-round draft pick 1992	Succeeded by Chris Gratton
