= Keith Redmond =

Canadian ice hockey player (born 1972)

- Born: October 25, 1972 (age 53) Richmond Hill, Ontario, Canada
- Height: 6 ft 3 in (191 cm)
- Weight: 208 lb (94 kg; 14 st 12 lb)
- Position: Left Wing
- Shot: Left
- Played for: Los Angeles Kings
- NHL draft: 79th overall, 1991; Los Angeles Kings
- Playing career: 1992–1996

Keith Christopher Redmond (born October 25, 1972) is a Canadian former professional ice hockey player, who played 12 games in the National Hockey League with the Los Angeles Kings during the 1993–94 season. The rest of his career, which lasted from 1992 to 1996, was spent in the minor leagues.

== Biography ==
Keith Redmond played college hockey for Bowling Green University during the 1990–91 and 1991–92 seasons. He also spent part of the 1991–92 season in the Ontario Hockey League (OHL) playing for the Belleville Bulls and the Detroit Ambassadors. In addition to his season in the NHL, he spent four seasons with the Phoenix Roadrunners of the International Hockey League. He was a left wing and his playing height and weight were 6 ft 3 in (1.91 m) and 208 pounds (94 kg). He was selected by the Kings in the 1991 NHL entry draft, 79th overall in the fourth round.

== Career statistics ==
=== Regular season and playoffs ===
			Regular season					Playoffs
Season	Team	League	GP	G	A	Pts	PIM	GP	G	A	Pts	PIM
1988–89	Nepean Raiders	CJHL	59	3	12	15	110	—	—	—	—	—
1989–90	Nepean Raiders	CJHL	40	14	10	24	169	—	—	—	—	—
1990–91	Bowling Green State University	CCHA	35	1	3	4	72	—	—	—	—	—
1991–92	Bowling Green State University	CCHA	8	0	0	0	14	—	—	—	—	—
1991–92	Belleville Bulls	OHL	16	1	7	8	52	—	—	—	—	—
1991–92	Detroit Compuware Ambassadors	OHL	25	6	12	18	61	7	1	3	4	49
1992–93	Muskegon Fury	CoHL	4	1	0	1	46	—	—	—	—	—
1992–93	Phoenix Roadrunners	IHL	53	6	10	16	285	—	—	—	—	—
1993–94	Los Angeles Kings	NHL	12	1	0	1	20	—	—	—	—	—
1993–94	Phoenix Roadrunners	IHL	43	8	10	18	196	—	—	—	—	—
1994–95	Phoenix Roadrunners	IHL	20	0	3	3	81	6	2	1	3	29
1995–96	Phoenix Roadrunners	IHL	34	5	3	8	164	1	0	0	0	0
IHL totals			150	19	26	45	726	7	2	1	3	29
NHL totals			12	1	0	1	20	—	—	—	—	—
