= Martin Hamrlík =

Czech ice hockey player

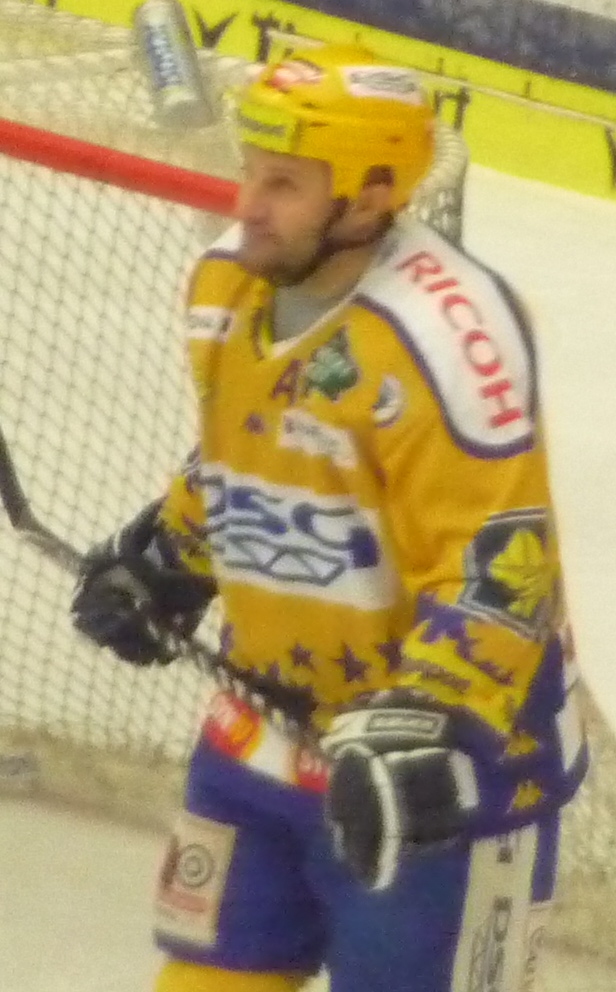
- Born: May 6, 1973 (age 53) Zlín, TCH
- Height: 5 ft 10 in (178 cm)
- Weight: 205 lb (93 kg; 14 st 9 lb)
- Position: Defence
- Shot: Right
- Played for: Zlin ZPS HC; Springfield Indians (AHL); Peoria Rivermen (IHL); Long Beach Ice Dogs (IHL); Orlando Solar Bears (IHL)
- National team: Czech Republic
- NHL draft: 31st overall, 1991; Hartford Whalers
- Playing career: 1989–2013

Martin Hamrlík (born May 6, 1973) is a retired Czech ice hockey player most recently with Zlin ZPS HC of the Czech Extraliga. He was drafted by the Hartford Whalers 31st overall in the 1991 NHL entry draft, but never played in the NHL.

== Playing career ==
Hamrlik began his career at the age of 16 with Zlin. He played with them until he was drafted in 1991. He resumed his playing career with the Ottawa 67's of the OHL. He played one AHL game in 1993-94 with the Springfield Indians. He then played in the IHL for three teams in four years, before returning to Zlin in 1997. He played for Zlin for 18 seasons, from 1989 to 1991, and 1997 to 2013.

His younger brother Roman Hamrlík played 1395 NHL games for seven different NHL teams.
