= Jay Wells =

Canadian ice hockey player and coach

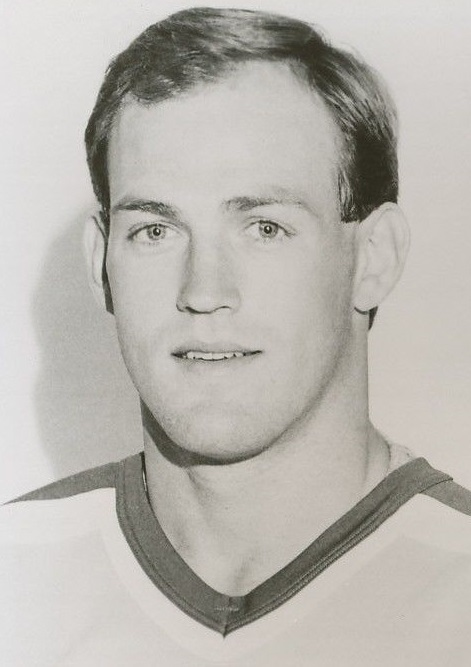
- Wells in 1980
- Born: May 18, 1959 (age 67) Paris, Ontario, Canada
- Height: 6 ft 1 in (185 cm)
- Weight: 205 lb (93 kg; 14 st 9 lb)
- Position: Defence
- Shot: Left
- Played for: Los Angeles Kings; Philadelphia Flyers; Buffalo Sabres; New York Rangers; St. Louis Blues; Tampa Bay Lightning
- National team: Canada
- NHL draft: 16th overall, 1979; Los Angeles Kings
- Playing career: 1979–1997

Gordon Jay Wells (born May 18, 1959) is a Canadian former professional ice hockey player and coach. He was nicknamed "the Hammer" for his tough, physical style of play.

== Playing career ==
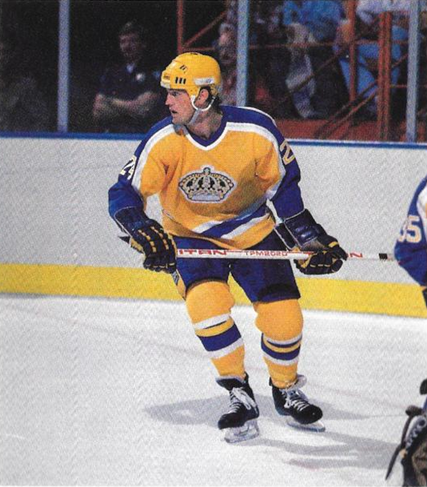
1984 photo of Jay Wells for Los Angeles Kings

Wells played his junior hockey with the Kingston Canadians of the OMJHL from 1976 to 1979, playing in 175 games, and earning 60 points (19 goals-41 assists), along with 385 penalty minutes. He also had 14 points in 30 playoff games. A solid stay-at-home defenceman, Wells was drafted by the Los Angeles Kings in the first round, 16th overall in the 1979 NHL entry draft.

Wells began the 1979–80 season with the Binghamton Dusters of the AHL, getting 6 assists in 28 games, before joining the Kings, where he had no points in 43 games. He also had no points in 4 playoff games. Wells spent the entire 1980–81 season with Los Angeles, where he got 18 points in 72 games, and had no points in 4 playoff games. In 1981–82, he played in 60 games, getting nine points, then added four points in 10 playoff games. Wells' offensive production increased in 1982–83, when he got 15 points in 69 games, and in 1983–84, he set a career high with 21 points in 69 games, but the Kings failed to make the playoffs in both years. Wells then had 11 points in 77 games in 1984–85, helping the Kings return to the playoffs, where he recorded an assist in three games. Wells had the best season of his career in 1985–86, getting 42 points in 79 games, however, Los Angeles failed to make the playoffs. In 1986–87, Wells had 36 points in 77 games, and added three points in five playoff games. Wells then had 25 points in 58 games, and had three points in five playoff games for the Kings in 1987–88. On September 29, 1988, Wells was traded from the Kings to the Philadelphia Flyers for Doug Crossman.

In Wells' first season with the Flyers in 1988–89, he registered 21 points in 67 games, and added two points in 18 playoff games. He began the 1989–90 season with Philadelphia, earning 19 points in 59 games, before being traded to the Buffalo Sabres on March 5, 1990, along with the Flyers fourth-round pick in the 1991 NHL entry draft in exchange for Kevin Maguire and the Sabres second-round choice in the 1990 NHL entry draft.

Wells would play one regular season game with Buffalo in 1989–90, getting an assist in the game before suffering an injury, however, he returned in the playoffs and went pointless in six games. In 1990–91, Wells had three points in 43 games with Buffalo, and in one playoff game, he earned an assist. Wells began the 1991–92 with the Sabres, earning 11 points in 41 games, before being traded to the New York Rangers on March 9, 1992, in exchange for Randy Moller.

Wells played in 11 games for the Rangers at the end of the 1991–92 season, getting no points, and in 13 playoff games, he chipped in with two assists. In 1992–93, Wells had 10 points in 53 games, but the Rangers failed to qualify for the playoffs. He returned to the team in 1993–94, and had nine points in 79 games. Wells played a huge defensive role for the Rangers in the playoffs, as he helped the Rangers win the Stanley Cup for the first time since 1940. He played in 23 playoff games, registering no points. Wells had nine points for the Rangers in 1994–95 in 43 games, and went pointless in 10 playoff games. On July 31, 1995, the Rangers traded Wells to the St. Louis Blues for Doug Lidster.

Wells played in 76 games with the Blues in 1995–96, getting three points, and in 12 play-off games, he earned an assist. He was granted free agency after the season, and on August 3, 1996, Wells signed a contract with the Tampa Bay Lightning. In 1996–97, Wells would go pointless in 21 games with Tampa Bay, and retired from the NHL after the season after an 18-year playing career. In 2007, he was named coach of the Brantford Golden Eagles before signing with the AHL's Manitoba Moose as an assistant coach from 2008 to 2011. In 2011, Wells became an assistant coach with the Barrie Colts of the Ontario Hockey League, and from 2014 to 2016 he was an assistant coach for the Saginaw Spirit.

== Career statistics ==
=== Regular season and playoffs ===
			Regular season					Playoffs
Season	Team	League	GP	G	A	Pts	PIM	GP	G	A	Pts	PIM
1975–76	Preston Raiders	MWJHL	22	2	10	12	—	—	—	—	—	—
1976–77	Kingston Canadians	OMJHL	59	4	7	11	90	14	1	1	2	20
1977–78	Kingston Canadians	OMJHL	68	9	13	22	195	5	1	2	3	6
1978–79	Kingston Canadians	OMJHL	48	6	21	27	100	11	2	7	9	29
1979–80	Los Angeles Kings	NHL	43	0	0	0	113	4	0	0	0	11
1979–80	Binghamton Dusters	AHL	28	0	6	6	48	—	—	—	—	—
1980–81	Los Angeles Kings	NHL	72	5	13	18	155	4	0	0	0	27
1981–82	Los Angeles Kings	NHL	60	1	8	9	145	10	1	3	4	41
1982–83	Los Angeles Kings	NHL	69	3	12	15	167	—	—	—	—	—
1983–84	Los Angeles Kings	NHL	69	3	18	21	141	—	—	—	—	—
1984–85	Los Angeles Kings	NHL	77	2	9	11	185	—	—	—	—	—
1985–86	Los Angeles Kings	NHL	79	11	31	42	226	—	—	—	—	—
1986–87	Los Angeles Kings	NHL	77	7	29	36	155	5	1	2	3	10
1987–88	Los Angeles Kings	NHL	58	2	23	25	159	5	1	2	3	21
1988–89	Philadelphia Flyers	NHL	67	2	19	21	184	18	0	2	2	51
1989–90	Philadelphia Flyers	NHL	59	3	16	19	129	—	—	—	—	—
1989–90	Buffalo Sabres	NHL	1	0	1	1	0	6	0	0	0	12
1990–91	Buffalo Sabres	NHL	43	1	2	3	86	1	0	1	1	0
1991–92	Buffalo Sabres	NHL	41	2	9	11	157	—	—	—	—	—
1991–92	New York Rangers	NHL	11	0	0	0	24	13	0	2	2	10
1992–93	New York Rangers	NHL	53	1	9	10	107	—	—	—	—	—
1993–94	New York Rangers	NHL	79	2	7	9	110	23	0	0	0	20
1994–95	New York Rangers	NHL	43	2	7	9	36	10	0	0	0	8
1995–96	St. Louis Blues	NHL	76	0	3	3	67	12	0	1	1	2
1996–97	Tampa Bay Lightning	NHL	21	0	0	0	13	—	—	—	—	—
NHL totals			1,098	47	216	263	2,359	114	3	14	17	213

=== International ===
Year	Team	Event	GP	G	A	Pts	PIM
1986	Canada	WC	10	0	2	2	16

== Awards and achievements ==
- OMJHL First Team All-Star (1979)
- Stanley Cup Champion (1993–94)

== See also ==
- List of NHL players with 1,000 games played
- List of NHL players with 2,000 career penalty minutes

Preceded by Tim Young	Los Angeles Kings first-round draft pick 1979	Succeeded by Larry Murphy
