= Kevin McClelland =

Canadian ice hockey coach

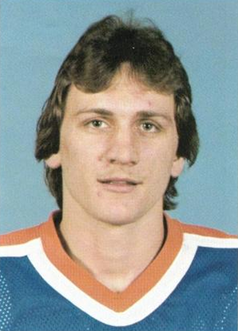
- McClelland in 1984 photo
- Born: July 4, 1962 (age 64) Oshawa, Ontario, Canada
- Height: 6 ft 0 in (183 cm)
- Weight: 190 lb (86 kg; 13 st 8 lb)
- Position: Right wing
- Shot: Right
- Played for: Pittsburgh Penguins; Edmonton Oilers; Detroit Red Wings; Toronto Maple Leafs; Winnipeg Jets
- NHL draft: 71st overall, 1980; Hartford Whalers
- Playing career: 1981–1995

Kevin McClelland (born July 4, 1962) is a Canadian former professional ice hockey player. He was recently the head coach of the Wichita Thunder in the ECHL. Throughout his career, he was known as an enforcer.

== Playing career ==
As a youth, McClelland played in the 1975 Quebec International Pee-Wee Hockey Tournament with a minor ice hockey team from Oshawa.

McClelland was drafted in the fourth round, 71st overall, by the Hartford Whalers during the 1980 NHL entry draft. The majority of his NHL career was served playing center ice with the Edmonton Oilers (1984–1989), with whom he won four Stanley Cups 1984-85-87-88. His most memorable playoff moment came in game one of the 1984 Stanley Cup Final when he scored the game's only goal in a 1-0 win over the New York Islanders. McClelland retired from the NHL following 588 games, recording a total of 68 goals, 112 assists, 180 points, and 1672 penalty minutes.

== Career statistics ==
=== Regular season and playoffs ===
| | | | Regular season | | | | | Playoffs |
| Season | Team | League | GP | G | A | Pts | PIM | GP | G | A | Pts | PIM |
|---|---|---|---|---|---|---|---|---|---|---|---|---|
| 1978–79 | Oshawa Legionaires | MetJHL | 64 | 50 | 74 | 124 | — | — | — | — | — | — |
| 1979–80 | Niagara Falls Flyers | OMJHL | 67 | 14 | 14 | 28 | 71 | 10 | 6 | 3 | 9 | 49 |
| 1980–81 | Niagara Falls Flyers | OHL | 68 | 36 | 72 | 108 | 186 | 12 | 8 | 13 | 21 | 42 |
| 1981–82 | Niagara Falls Flyers | OHL | 46 | 36 | 47 | 83 | 184 | 5 | 5 | 5 | 10 | 14 |
| 1981–82 | Pittsburgh Penguins | NHL | 10 | 1 | 4 | 5 | 4 | 5 | 1 | 1 | 2 | 5 |
| 1982–83 | Pittsburgh Penguins | NHL | 38 | 5 | 4 | 9 | 73 | — | — | — | — | — |
| 1983–84 | Pittsburgh Penguins | NHL | 24 | 2 | 4 | 6 | 62 | — | — | — | — | — |
| 1983–84 | Baltimore Skipjacks | AHL | 3 | 1 | 1 | 2 | 0 | — | — | — | — | — |
| 1983–84 | Edmonton Oilers | NHL | 52 | 8 | 20 | 28 | 127 | 18 | 4 | 6 | 10 | 42 |
| 1984–85 | Edmonton Oilers | NHL | 62 | 8 | 15 | 23 | 205 | 18 | 1 | 3 | 4 | 75 |
| 1985–86 | Edmonton Oilers | NHL | 79 | 11 | 25 | 36 | 266 | 10 | 1 | 0 | 1 | 32 |
| 1986–87 | Edmonton Oilers | NHL | 72 | 12 | 13 | 25 | 238 | 21 | 2 | 3 | 5 | 43 |
| 1987–88 | Edmonton Oilers | NHL | 74 | 10 | 6 | 16 | 281 | 19 | 2 | 3 | 5 | 68 |
| 1988–89 | Edmonton Oilers | NHL | 79 | 6 | 14 | 20 | 161 | 7 | 0 | 2 | 2 | 16 |
| 1989–90 | Edmonton Oilers | NHL | 10 | 1 | 1 | 2 | 13 | — | — | — | — | — |
| 1989–90 | Detroit Red Wings | NHL | 61 | 4 | 5 | 9 | 183 | — | — | — | — | — |
| 1990–91 | Detroit Red Wings | NHL | 3 | 0 | 0 | 0 | 7 | — | — | — | — | — |
| 1990–91 | Adirondack Red Wings | AHL | 27 | 5 | 14 | 19 | 125 | — | — | — | — | — |
| 1991–92 | Toronto Maple Leafs | NHL | 18 | 0 | 1 | 1 | 33 | — | — | — | — | — |
| 1991–92 | St. John's Maple Leafs | AHL | 34 | 7 | 15 | 22 | 199 | 5 | 0 | 1 | 1 | 9 |
| 1992–93 | St. John's Maple Leafs | AHL | 55 | 7 | 20 | 27 | 221 | 1 | 0 | 0 | 0 | 7 |
| 1993–94 | Winnipeg Jets | NHL | 6 | 0 | 0 | 0 | 19 | — | — | — | — | — |
| 1993–94 | Moncton Hawks | AHL | 39 | 3 | 5 | 8 | 233 | 1 | 0 | 0 | 0 | 2 |
| 1994–95 | Rochester Americans | AHL | 22 | 0 | 2 | 2 | 93 | — | — | — | — | — |
| NHL totals | | | 588 | 68 | 112 | 180 | 1672 | 98 | 11 | 18 | 29 | 281 |

== Coaching career ==
He served as the head coach of the Central Hockey League's Mississippi RiverKings for three years until he resigned on June 11, 2008. He also was the head coach of the Colorado Eagles of the Central Hockey League from 2008 to 2010. On April 26, 2010, McClelland was introduced as the head coach of the Wichita Thunder of the Central Hockey League. He would serve as head coach of the Thunder through their transition to the ECHL but after the 2015–16 season, in which the team finished last in the league, his contract would not be renewed.

== Coaching statistics ==
| | | | Regular season | | | | | | | Postseason | | | |
| Year | Team | League | G | W | L | T | OTL | Pts | Finish | G | W | L | Result |
|---|---|---|---|---|---|---|---|---|---|---|---|---|---|
| 1998–99 | Prince Albert Raiders | WHL | 72 | 45 | 22 | 5 | 0 | 95 | 1st East | 14 | 9 | 5 | Lost in Round 3 |
| 1999–00 | Prince Albert Raiders | WHL | 72 | 26 | 33 | 6 | 7 | 65 | 4th East | 6 | 2 | 4 | Lost in Round 1 |
| 2005–06 | Memphis Riverkings | CHL | 64 | 22 | 37 | 0 | 5 | 49 | 4th Northeast | Did not qualify | | | |
| 2006–07 | Memphis Riverkings | CHL | 64 | 39 | 19 | 0 | 6 | 84 | 2nd Northeast | 18 | 9 | 9 | Lost in Round 3 |
| 2007–08 | Mississippi RiverKings | CHL | 64 | 39 | 21 | 0 | 4 | 82 | 3rd Northeast | 3 | 1 | 2 | Lost in Round 1 |
| 2008–09 | Colorado Eagles | CHL | 64 | 45 | 15 | 0 | 4 | 94 | 1st Northwest | 15 | 9 | 6 | Lost in Finals |
| 2009–10 | Colorado Eagles | CHL | 64 | 42 | 15 | 0 | 7 | 91 | 2nd Northern | 4 | 0 | 4 | Lost in Round 2 |
| 2010–11 | Wichita Thunder | CHL | 66 | 34 | 26 | 0 | 6 | 74 | 5th Turner | 5 | 2 | 3 | Lost in Round 1 |
| 2011–12 | Wichita Thunder | CHL | 66 | 44 | 19 | 0 | 3 | 91 | 1st Berry | 16 | 9 | 7 | Lost in Finals |
| 2012–13 | Wichita Thunder | CHL | 66 | 39 | 19 | 0 | 8 | 86 | 2nd Overall | 15 | 11 | 4 | Lost in Finals |
| 2013–14 | Wichita Thunder | CHL | 66 | 27 | 30 | 0 | 9 | 63 | 9th Overall | Did not qualify | | | |
| 2014–15 | Wichita Thunder | ECHL | 72 | 32 | 31 | 2 | 7 | 73 | 5th Central | Did not qualify | | | |
| 2015–16 | Wichita Thunder | ECHL | 72 | 18 | 41 | 7 | 6 | 49 | 4th Central | Did not qualify | | | |

== Awards and achievements ==
- 1983–84 - NHL - Stanley Cup (Edmonton)
- 1984–85 - NHL - Stanley Cup (Edmonton)
- 1986–87 - NHL - Stanley Cup (Edmonton)
- 1987–88 - NHL - Stanley Cup (Edmonton)

== Transactions ==
- June 11, 1980 - Drafted by the Hartford Whalers in the fourth round, 71st overall.
- June 29, 1981 - Traded from Hartford Whalers with Pat Boutette to Pittsburgh Penguins for compensation for signing Greg Millen.

December 5, 1983- Traded from Pittsburgh Penguins with a fourth round pick in 1984 to Edmonton Oilers for Tom Roulston.

- November 2, 1989 - Traded from Edmonton Oilers with Jimmy Carson and round 5 pick in the 1991 draft to Detroit Red Wings for Adam Graves, Petr Klima, Joe Murphy and Jeff Sharples.
- August 12, 1993 Traded from Toronto Maple Leafs to Winnipeg Jets for cash.

Sporting positions
| Preceded by Jason Duda | Wichita Thunder head coach 2010–2016 | Succeeded by Malcolm Cameron |
