= Rob Leask =

Canadian-German ice hockey player

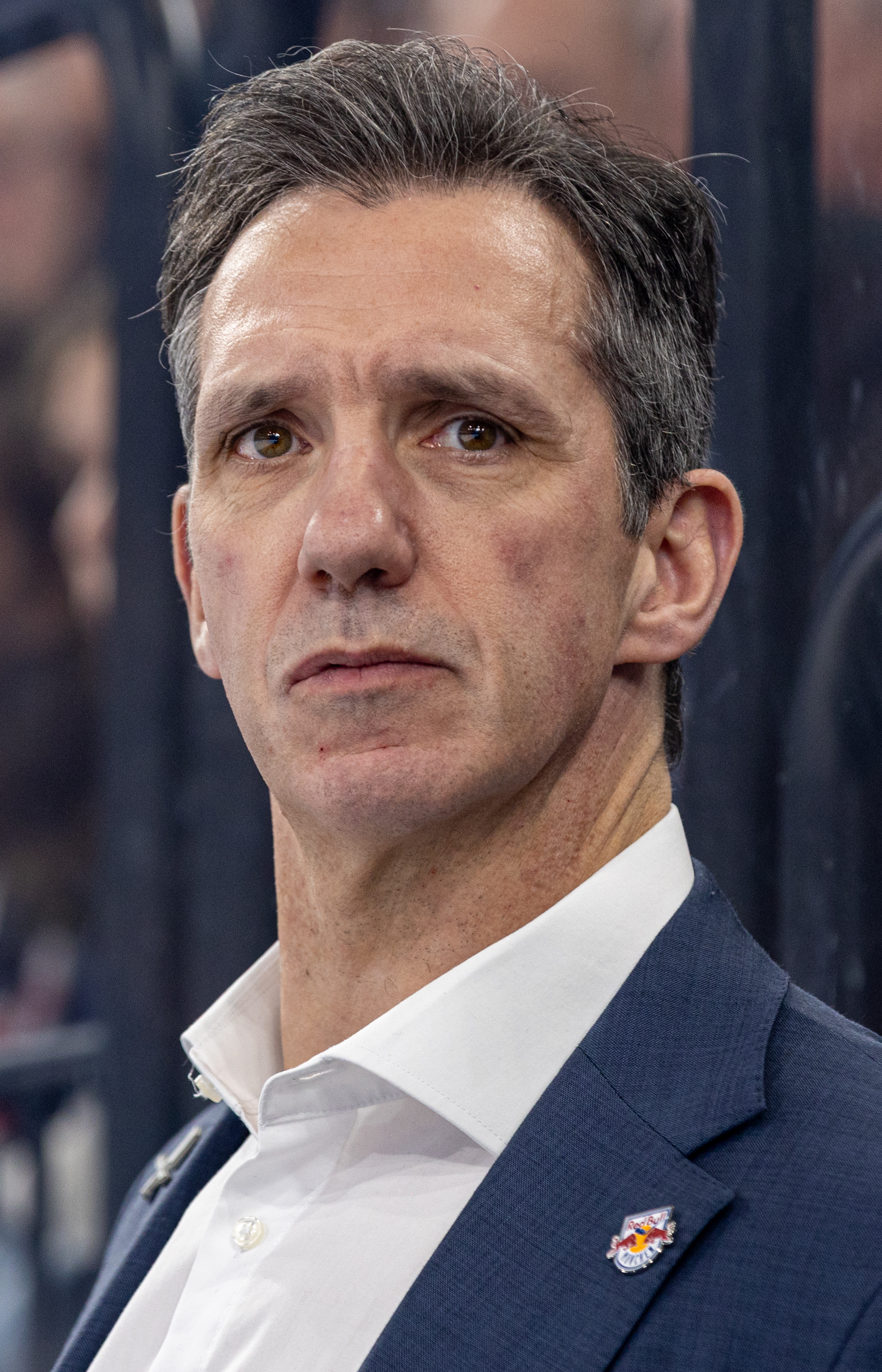
- Leask in 2025
- Born: June 9, 1971 (age 55) North York, Ontario, Canada
- Height: 6 ft 2 in (188 cm)
- Weight: 205 lb (93 kg; 14 st 9 lb)
- Position: Defence
- Shot: Left
- Played for: Baltimore Skipjacks; Hershey Bears; Portland Pirates; Eisbären Berlin; Hamburg Freezers; Thomas Sabo Ice Tigers
- National team: Canada and Germany
- NHL draft: 209th overall, 1991; Washington Capitals
- Playing career: 1992–2013

Robert Leask (born June 9, 1971) is a Canadian-German ice hockey coach and former professional ice hockey defenceman who played primarily in the Deutsche Eishockey Liga. Born in North York, Ontario, Leask was granted German citizenship in 2004.

== Playing career ==
Leask was drafted 209th overall in the 1991 NHL entry draft by the Washington Capitals. He started his professional career with the Baltimore Skipjacks of the AHL in 1992. As a member of the Johnstown Chiefs, Leask was named to the ECHL All-Star Team in 1994 and 1995.

Leask spent the 1995-96 playing for the Canadian National Team. Later in his career, he represented the German National Team, participating in the 2004 and 2006 World Championships and the 2006 Olympic Games in Turin.

Leask played in the Deutsche Eishockey Liga (DEL) since 1996. As a member of Eisbären Berlin, Leask was named to the DEL All-Star Team in both 2004 and 2005 and was a member of the team when Eisbären Berlin won the DEL Championship in 2005 and 2006.

After three seasons with the Hamburg Freezers, Leask was signed as an injury replacement for the Nürnberg Ice Tigers on August 26, 2009. On March 10, 2010, Leask signed an extension with the Ice Tigers. He finished his playing career at the end of the 2012-13 season.

== Coaching career ==
Leask began his coaching career at German Oberliga side EV Regensburg, being appointed head coach of the Regensburg team on May 31, 2013. After being sacked by Regensburg in February 2014 he served as an assistant coach at the EC Kassel Huskies in the DEL2, the second-tier league in Germany, during the 2014-15 campaign. In April 2015, Leask was named assistant coach of the Straubing Tigers, a member of the German top-tier league Deutsche Eishockey Liga.

== Career statistics ==
=== Regular season and playoffs ===
			Regular season					Playoffs
Season	Team	League	GP	G	A	Pts	PIM	GP	G	A	Pts	PIM
1987–88	Toronto Marlboros AAA	GTHL U16
1987–88	Pickering Panthers	MetJHL	3	0	1	1	0	—	—	—	—	—
1988–89	Toronto Marlboros	OHL	64	4	21	25	63	6	0	1	1	4
1989–90	Hamilton Dukes	OHL	43	6	18	24	50	—	—	—	—	—
1990–91	Hamilton Dukes	OHL	62	11	27	38	85	4	1	2	3	2
1991–92	Guelph Storm	OHL	7	0	1	1	15	—	—	—	—	—
1991–92	Oshawa Generals	OHL	49	13	27	40	90	7	1	4	5	4
1991–92	Baltimore Skipjacks	AHL	4	0	0	0	0	—	—	—	—	—
1992–93	Baltimore Skipjacks	AHL	68	4	8	12	76	7	0	1	1	14
1993–94	Johnstown Chiefs	ECHL	52	11	25	36	137	3	1	2	3	14
1993–94	Hershey Bears	AHL	17	0	1	1	17	—	—	—	—	—
1994–95	Johnstown Chiefs	ECHL	60	16	45	61	110	1	0	0	0	0
1994–95	Hershey Bears	AHL	15	0	1	1	6	—	—	—	—	—
1995–96	Canadian National Team	Intl	53	6	12	18	48	—	—	—	—	—
1995–96	Portland Pirates	AHL	3	0	2	2	2	23	0	7	7	21
1996–97	Eisbären Berlin	DEL	50	4	17	21	80	8	2	2	4	14
1997–98	Eisbären Berlin	DEL	32	2	3	5	38	9	2	0	2	37
1998–99	Eisbären Berlin	DEL	39	11	14	25	49	8	0	0	0	30
1999–2000	Eisbären Berlin	DEL	52	5	12	17	46	—	—	—	—	—
2000–01	Eisbären Berlin	DEL	50	1	15	16	143	—	—	—	—	—
2001–02	Eisbären Berlin	DEL	58	1	23	24	114	4	0	0	0	2
2002–03	Eisbären Berlin	DEL	49	4	12	16	112	9	1	1	2	10
2003–04	Eisbären Berlin	DEL	50	11	16	27	107	6	0	0	0	8
2004–05	Eisbären Berlin	DEL	42	3	11	14	70	—	—	—	—	—
2005–06	Eisbären Berlin	DEL	43	3	14	17	40	11	1	2	3	12
2006–07	Hamburg Freezers	DEL	48	4	16	20	79	7	0	1	1	10
2007–08	Hamburg Freezers	DEL	52	3	17	20	115	8	0	3	3	14
2008–09	Hamburg Freezers	DEL	52	0	15	15	88	8	1	0	1	35
2009–10	Thomas Sabo Ice Tigers	DEL	54	2	12	14	89	5	0	2	2	4
2010–11	Thomas Sabo Ice Tigers	DEL	48	2	8	10	56	2	0	1	1	0
2011–12	Thomas Sabo Ice Tigers	DEL	52	1	19	20	54	—	—	—	—	—
2012–13	Thomas Sabo Ice Tigers	DEL	50	0	6	6	66	3	1	0	1	4
AHL totals			107	4	12	16	122	30	0	8	8	35
DEL totals			821	57	230	287	1346	100	9	21	30	188

=== International ===
Year	Team	Event	GP	G	A	Pts	PIM
2004	Germany	WC	6	0	0	0	8
2004	Germany	WCH	4	0	1	1	6
2006	Germany	OG	5	0	0	0	6
Senior totals			15	0	1	1	20

== Awards and honours ==
- Played in ECHL All-Star Game in 1994 and 1995
- Played in DEL All-Star Game in 1998,

2004 and 2005

- DEL Champion in 2005 and 2006 (Eisbären Berlin)
