= Peter Ambroziak =

Canadian ice hockey player, coach, and executive

- Born: September 15, 1971 (age 55) Kanata, Ontario, Canada
- Height: 6 ft 0 in (183 cm)
- Weight: 206 lb (93 kg; 14 st 10 lb)
- Position: Left wing
- Shot: Left
- Played for: Buffalo Sabres
- NHL draft: 72nd overall, 1991; Buffalo Sabres
- Playing career: 1992–2005

Peter A. Ambroziak (born September 15, 1971) is a Canadian former professional ice hockey player, former coach and currently an executive. He played 12 games in the National Hockey League (NHL) with the Buffalo Sabres in 1994–95, and several seasons for minor league professional teams between 1992 and 2005. After his playing career finished, Ambroziak became a coach. Ambroziak is currently an executive in the Ottawa Senators organization, as head of hockey development for the Bell Sensplex hockey facility in Ottawa, Ontario.

== Playing career ==
Ambroziak was drafted in the fourth round, 72nd overall, by the Buffalo Sabres in the 1991 NHL entry draft. Ambroziak played 12 games for the Sabres during the 1994–95 season, earning one assist.

Drafted from the Ontario Hockey League's Ottawa 67's, Ambroziak debuted with Buffalo's American Hockey League affiliates, the Rochester Americans, in the 1991–92 season; however he never fulfilled the potential that the scouts had seen in him. He played with the Americans for parts of four seasons, and made a dozen NHL appearances with the Sabres during the 1994–95 season.

Ambroziak spent the next four seasons between the AHL, the International Hockey League, and the United Hockey League. In his six years in the minor pros Ambroziak never scored more than 29 points in one season. However, in 1999 he joined the New Mexico Scorpions of the Western Professional Hockey League, staying with the franchise through the league's merger with the Central Hockey League. He scored 87 and 78 points in his first two years with the club, and averaged just over 40 points in the next three. His final season with the Scorpions was the 2004–05 season, the team's final season in the city of Albuquerque (the team moved to Rio Rancho, New Mexico beginning with the 2006–2007 season).

Ambroziak was the head coach and director of hockey operations for the New Mexico Renegades of the Western States Hockey League. Ambroziak joined the Senators organization on March 14, 2011.

== Career statistics ==
=== Regular season and playoffs ===
			Regular season					Playoffs
Season	Team	League	GP	G	A	Pts	PIM	GP	G	A	Pts	PIM
1987–88	Ottawa Jr. Senators	CJHL	1	0	0	0	0	—	—	—	—	—
1988–89	Ottawa 67s	OHL	50	8	15	23	11	12	1	2	3	2
1989–90	Ottawa 67s	OHL	60	13	19	32	37	4	0	0	0	2
1990–91	Ottawa 67s	OHL	62	30	32	62	56	17	15	9	24	24
1991–92	Ottawa 67s	OHL	49	32	49	81	50	11	3	7	10	33
1991–92	Rochester Americans	AHL	2	0	1	1	0	—	—	—	—	—
1992–93	Rochester Americans	AHL	50	8	10	18	37	12	4	3	7	16
1993–94	Rochester Americans	AHL	22	3	4	7	53	—	—	—	—	—
1994–95	Buffalo Sabres	NHL	12	0	1	1	0	—	—	—	—	—
1994–95	Rochester Americans	AHL	46	14	11	25	35	4	0	0	0	6
1995–96	Albany River Rats	AHL	8	2	1	3	25	—	—	—	—	—
1995–96	Cornwall Aces	AHL	50	9	15	24	42	8	1	1	2	4
1996–97	Fort Wayne Komets	IHL	57	15	5	20	28	—	—	—	—	—
1997–98	Hershey Bears	AHL	63	7	11	18	61	5	0	1	1	6
1998–99	Flint Generals	UHL	40	19	27	46	90	5	0	2	2	12
1998–99	Detroit Vipers	IHL	33	5	8	13	30	2	0	0	0	0
1999–00	New Mexico Scorpions	WPHL	64	43	44	87	86	9	3	4	7	30
2000–01	New Mexico Scorpions	WPHL	59	39	39	78	107	—	—	—	—	—
2001–02	New Mexico Scorpions	CHL	40	17	21	38	60	—	—	—	—	—
2002–03	New Mexico Scorpions	CHL	52	20	32	52	44	4	2	0	2	4
2003–04	New Mexico Scorpions	CHL	54	26	29	55	66	—	—	—	—	—
2004–05	New Mexico Scorpions	CHL	35	16	18	34	50	—	—	—	—	—
AHL totals			241	43	53	96	253	29	5	5	10	32
NHL totals			12	0	1	1	0	—	—	—	—	—
