= Jeff Sharples =

Canadian ice hockey player (born 1967)

- Born: July 28, 1967 (age 58) Terrace, British Columbia, Canada
- Height: 6 ft 1 in (185 cm)
- Weight: 195 lb (88 kg; 13 st 13 lb)
- Position: Defence
- Shot: Left
- Played for: Detroit Red Wings
- NHL draft: 29th overall, 1985; Detroit Red Wings
- Playing career: 1987–2000

Jeffrey J. Sharples (born July 28, 1967) is a Canadian former professional ice hockey defenceman who played 105 games in the National Hockey League (NHL) with the Detroit Red Wings. He was a second round selection of the Red Wings, 29th overall, at the 1985 NHL entry draft and made his NHL debut late in the 1986–87 NHL season. Sharples was born in Terrace, British Columbia.

Sharples spent the majority of two seasons with the Red Wings until he was traded to the Edmonton Oilers on November 2, 1989. He never appeared in a regular-season game with Edmonton; his only action with the team was in an exhibition game against the Soviet club team, Khimik Voskresensk. Sharples spent most of the 1989–90 AHL season with the Cape Breton Oilers before he was again traded, this time to the New Jersey Devils on March 6, 1990. Sharples played ten more seasons in the minor leagues but never played in the NHL again. He retired in 2000.

== Career statistics ==
			Regular season					Playoffs
Season	Team	League	GP	G	A	Pts	PIM	GP	G	A	Pts	PIM
1983–84	Kelowna Wings	WHL	72	9	24	33	51	—	—	—	—	—
1984–85	Kelowna Wings	WHL	72	12	41	53	90	6	0	1	1	6
1985–86	Spokane Chiefs	WHL	3	0	0	0	4	—	—	—	—	—
1985–86	Portland Winterhawks	WHL	19	2	6	8	44	15	2	6	8	6
1986–87	Portland Winterhawks	WHL	44	25	35	60	92	20	7	15	22	23
1986–87	Detroit Red Wings	NHL	3	0	1	1	2	2	0	0	0	2
1987–88	Adirondack Red Wings	AHL	4	2	1	3	4	—	—	—	—	—
1987–88	Detroit Red Wings	NHL	56	10	25	35	42	4	0	3	3	4
1988–89	Adirondack Red Wings	AHL	10	0	4	4	8	—	—	—	—	—
1988–89	Detroit Red Wings	NHL	46	4	9	13	26	1	0	0	0	0
1989–90	Utica Devils	AHL	13	2	5	7	19	5	1	2	3	15
1989–90	Adirondack Red Wings	AHL	9	2	5	7	6	—	—	—	—	—
1989–90	Cape Breton Oilers	AHL	38	4	13	17	28	—	—	—	—	—
1990–91	Utica Devils	AHL	64	16	29	45	42	—	—	—	—	—
1991–92	Capital District Islanders	AHL	31	3	12	15	18	7	6	5	11	4
1992–93	Kansas City Blades	IHL	39	5	21	26	43	8	0	0	0	6
1993–94	Las Vegas Thunder	IHL	68	18	32	50	68	5	2	1	3	6
1994–95	Las Vegas Thunder	IHL	72	20	33	53	63	10	4	4	8	18
1995–96	Las Vegas Thunder	IHL	41	6	14	20	56	—	—	—	—	—
1995–96	Utah Grizzlies	IHL	31	2	15	17	18	21	3	10	13	16
1996–97	Utah Grizzlies	IHL	49	9	26	35	54	7	0	2	2	10
1997–98	Utah Grizzlies	IHL	76	10	28	38	82	4	1	1	2	6
1998–99	Utah Grizzlies	IHL	78	8	29	37	93	—	—	—	—	—
1999–00	Utah Grizzlies	IHL	33	2	9	11	49	—	—	—	—	—
NHL totals			105	14	35	49	70	7	0	3	3	6
AHL totals			169	29	69	98	125	12	7	7	14	19

== Awards ==
- WHL West Second All-Star Team – 1985
