= 1994–95 NHL transactions =

This list is for 1994–95 NHL transactions within professional ice hockey league of players in North America. The following contains team-to-team transactions that occurred in the National Hockey League during the 1994–95 NHL season. It lists what team each player has been traded to, or claimed by, and for which players or draft picks, if applicable.

== May ==
| Date | | | References |
|---|---|---|---|
| May 25, 1994 | To Detroit Red Wings 3rd-rd pick – 1995 entry draft (# 58 – Darryl Laplante) | To Winnipeg Jets Sheldon Kennedy | |
| May 31, 1994 | To New Jersey Devils 4th-rd pick – 1994 entry draft (CGY - # 91 – Ryan Duthie)^{1} | To Tampa Bay Lightning Jeff Toms | |

1. New Jersey's fourth-round pick went to the Calgary Flames as the result of a trade on June 29, 1994, that sent a third-round pick in the 1994 entry draft to New Jersey in exchange for a third-round and fifth-round picks in the 1994 entry draft and this pick.

== June ==
| Date | | | References |
|---|---|---|---|
| June 3, 1994 | To New Jersey Devils 11th-rd pick – 1994 entry draft (# 269 – Mike Hanson) | To Quebec Nordiques Stephane Yelle; 11th-rd pick – 1994 entry draft (# 285 – Steven Low) | |
| June 3, 1994 | To Chicago Blackhawks 3rd-rd pick – 1995 entry draft (# 71 – Kevin McKay) | To Winnipeg Jets Neil Wilkinson | |
| June 25, 1994 | To Los Angeles Kings 7th-rd pick – 1995 entry draft (# 157 – Benoit Larose) | To Ottawa Senators Jim Paek | |
| June 28, 1994 | To Mighty Ducks of Anaheim 3rd-rd pick - 1994 entry draft (TBL - # 55 – Vadim Epanchintsev)^{1} | To Ottawa Senators Sean Hill; 9th-rd pick - 1994 entry draft (# 210 – Frederic Cassivi) | |
| June 28, 1994 | To Quebec Nordiques Uwe Krupp; 1st-rd pick - 1994 entry draft (# 12 – Wade Belak) | To New York Islanders Ron Sutter; 1st-rd pick - 1994 entry draft (# 9 – Brett Lindros) | |
| June 28, 1994 | To Toronto Maple Leafs Garth Butcher; Mats Sundin; Todd Warriner; 1st-rd pick - 1994 entry draft (WAS - # 54 – Nolan Baumgartner)^{2} | To Quebec Nordiques Wendel Clark; Sylvain Lefebvre; Landon Wilson; 1st-rd pick - 1994 entry draft (# 22 – Jeff Kealty) | |
| June 28, 1994 | To Toronto Maple Leafs Mike Ridley; 1st-rd pick - 1994 entry draft (# 16 – Eric Fichaud) | To Washington Capitals Rob Pearson; 1st-rd pick - 1994 entry draft (# 54 – Nolan Baumgartner) | |
| June 28, 1994 | To Toronto Maple Leafs 3rd-rd pick - 1994 entry draft # 64 – Fredrik Modin) | To New York Islanders 2nd-rd pick - 1995 entry draft # 41 – D.J. Smith) | |
| June 29, 1994 | To Calgary Flames Steve Chiasson | To Detroit Red Wings Mike Vernon | |
| June 29, 1994 | To Mighty Ducks of Anaheim Tom Kurvers | To New York Islanders Troy Loney | |
| June 29, 1994 | To Mighty Ducks of Anaheim 3rd-rd pick - 1994 entry draft (# 67 – Craig Reichert); 4th-rd pick - 1995 entry draft (CHI - # 82 – Chris Van Dyk)^{3} | To Tampa Bay Lightning 3rd-rd pick - 1994 entry draft (# 55 – Vadim Epanchintsev) | |
| June 29, 1994 | To Vancouver Canucks Artur Oktyabrev | To Winnipeg Jets 6th-rd pick – 1994 entry draft (# 143 – Steve Vezina) | |
| June 29, 1994 | To Montreal Canadiens Yves Racine | To Philadelphia Flyers Kevin Haller | |
| June 29, 1994 | To New Jersey Devils 3rd-rd pick - 1994 entry draft (# 71 – Sheldon Souray) | To Calgary Flames 3rd-rd pick - 1994 entry draft (# 77 – Chris Clark); 4th-rd pick - 1994 entry draft (# 91 – Ryan Duthie); 5th-rd pick - 1994 entry draft (# 107 – Nils Ekman) | |

1. Anaheim's third-round pick went to Tampa Bay as the result of a trade on June 29 that sent a third-round pick in the 1994 entry draft and a fourth-round pick in the 1995 entry draft to Anaheim in exchange for this pick.
2. Toronto's first-round pick went to Washington as the result of a trade on June 28 that sent Mike Ridley and a first-round pick in the 1994 entry draft to Toronto in exchange for Rob Pearson and this pick.
3. Anaheim's fourth-round pick went to Chicago as the result of a trade on July 12, 1994, that sent Robert Dirk to Anaheim in exchange for this pick.

== July ==
| Date | | | References |
|---|---|---|---|
| July 4, 1994 | To Calgary Flames Phil Housley; 2nd-rd pick – 1996 entry draft (# 40 – Steve Begin); 2nd-rd pick – 1997 entry draft (# 42 – John Tripp) | To St. Louis Blues Al MacInnis; 4th-rd pick – 1997 entry draft (# 86 – Didier Tremblay) | |
| July 8, 1994 | To Buffalo Sabres Kevin McClelland | To Winnipeg Jets future considerations | |
| July 11, 1994 | To Toronto Maple Leafs 4th-rd pick – 1996 entry draft (LAK - # 84 – Mikael Simons)^{1} | To Los Angeles Kings Yanic Perreault | |
| July 12, 1994 | To Mighty Ducks of Anaheim Robert Dirk | To Chicago Blackhawks 4th-rd pick – 1995 entry draft (# 82 – Chris Van Dyk) | |
| July 24, 1994 | To St. Louis Blues Doug Lidster; Esa Tikkanen | To New York Rangers Petr Nedved | |
| July 26, 1994 | To Buffalo Sabres Doug Houda | To Los Angeles Kings Sean O'Donnell | |
| July 29, 1994 | To Los Angeles Kings Rick Tocchet; 2nd-rd pick – 1995 entry draft (# 50 – Pavel Rosa) | To Pittsburgh Penguins Luc Robitaille | |

1. Los Angeles' fourth-round pick was re-acquired as the result of a trade with Philadelphia on March 19, 1996, that sent John Druce and a seventh-round pick in the 1997 entry draft to Philadelphia in exchange for this pick.
  Toronto's fourth-round pick went to Philadelphia as the result of a trade on August 30, 1995, that sent Dmitry Yushkevich and a second-round pick in the 1996 entry draft to Toronto in exchange for a first-round pick in the 1996 entry draft, a second-round pick in the 1997 entry draft and this pick.

== August ==
| Date | | | References |
|---|---|---|---|
| August 8, 1994 | To Los Angeles Kings rights to Ruslan Batyrshin; 2nd-rd pick – 1996 entry draft - (# 37 – Marian Cisar); Jets' option to swap 6th-rd picks – 1996 entry draft (COL - # 146 – Brian Willsie)^{1} | To Winnipeg Jets Brent Thompson cash Jets' option to swap 6th-rd picks – 1996 entry draft (# 139 – Robert Esche) | |
| August 19, 1994 | To Boston Bruins Daniel Lacroix | To New York Rangers Glen Featherstone | |
| August 19, 1994 | To Montreal Canadiens Jim Montgomery | To St. Louis Blues Guy Carbonneau | |
| August 26, 1994 | To Hartford Whalers Glen Wesley | To Boston Bruins 1st-rd pick – 1995 entry draft (# 9 – Kyle McLaren); 1st-rd pick – 1996 entry draft (# 8 – Jonathan Aitken); 1st-rd pick – 1997 entry draft (# 8 – Sergei Samsonov) | |
| August 29, 1994 | To Mighty Ducks of Anaheim Jason Marshall | To St. Louis Blues Bill Houlder | |
| August 31, 1994 | To Mighty Ducks of Anaheim Darren Van Impe | To New York Islanders 9th-rd pick – 1995 entry draft (# 211 – Mike Broda) | |

1. Los Angeles' sixth-round pick went to Colorado as the result of a trade on December 28, 1995, that sent John Slaney to Los Angeles in exchange for this pick.

== September ==
| Date | | | References |
|---|---|---|---|
| September 6, 1994 | To Tampa Bay Lightning Alex Selivanov | To Philadelphia Flyers 4th-rd pick – 1995 entry draft (# 100 – Radovan Somik) | |
| September 22, 1994 | To Philadelphia Flyers Ron Hextall; 6th-rd pick – 1995 entry draft (# 132 – Dmitri Tertyshny) | To New York Islanders Tommy Soderstrom | |
| September 28, 1994 | To Toronto Maple Leafs Terry Yake | To Mighty Ducks of Anaheim David Sacco | |
| September 29, 1994 | To Calgary Flames 3rd-rd pick – 1996 entry draft (# 73 – Dmitri Vlasenkov); 4th-rd pick – 1997 entry draft (# 100 – Ryan Ready) | To Florida Panthers Robert Svehla; Magnus Svensson | |

== October ==
| Date | | | References |
|---|---|---|---|
| October 3, 1994 | To Toronto Maple Leafs Kelly Fairchild; Guy Leveque; Shayne Toporowski; Dixon Ward | To Los Angeles Kings Eric Lacroix; Chris Snell; 4th-rd pick – 1996 entry draft (# 96 – Eric Belanger) | |
| October 6, 1994 | To St. Louis Blues Adam Creighton | To Tampa Bay Lightning Tom Tilley | |
| October 15, 1994 | To New York Islanders 5th-rd pick – 1996 entry draft (# 109 – Andy Berenzweig) | To Ottawa Senators Jason Zent | |

== January ==
| Date | | | References |
|---|---|---|---|
| January 18, 1995 | To Dallas Stars Kevin Hatcher | To Washington Capitals Rick Mrozik; Mark Tinordi | |
| January 18, 1995 | To Washington Capitals 5th-rd pick – 1995 entry draft (# 105 – Benoit Gratton) | To Ottawa Senators Don Beaupre | |
| January 30, 1995 | To New Jersey Devils Rob Conn | To Chicago Blackhawks Dean Malkoc | |
| January 31, 1995 | To Dallas Stars Iain Fraser | To Quebec Nordiques 7th-rd pick – 1996 entry draft (# 167 – Dan Hinote) | |

== February ==
| Date | | | References |
|---|---|---|---|
| February 2, 1995 | To Mighty Ducks of Anaheim Todd Krygier | To Washington Capitals 6th-rd pick – 1996 entry draft (DAL - # 90 – Mike Hurley)^{1} | |
| February 2, 1995 | To Tampa Bay Lightning Scott LaGrand | To Philadelphia Flyers Mike Greenlay | |
| February 6, 1995 | To San Jose Sharks 4th-rd pick – 1997 entry draft (NYR - # 93 – Tomi Kallarsson)^{2} | To Chicago Blackhawks Jimmy Waite | |
| February 9, 1995 | To Montreal Canadiens Mark Recchi; 3rd-rd pick - 1995 entry draft (# 74 – Martin Hohenberger) | To Philadelphia Flyers Eric Desjardins; Gilbert Dionne; John LeClair | |
| February 10, 1995 | To Los Angeles Kings Randy Burridge | To Washington Capitals Warren Rychel | |
| February 10, 1995 | To Toronto Maple Leafs Warren Rychel | To Washington Capitals 4th-rd pick – 1995 entry draft (# 93 – Sebastien Charpentier) | |
| February 10, 1995 | To Boston Bruins 8th-rd pick – 1995 entry draft (# 184 – Ray Schultz) | To New York Islanders Paul Stanton | |
| February 10, 1995 | To Montreal Canadiens Mark Lamb | To Philadelphia Flyers cash | |
| February 14, 1995 | To Buffalo Sabres Charlie Huddy; Robb Stauber; Alexei Zhitnik; 5th-rd pick – 1995 entry draft (# 111 – Marian Menhart) | To Los Angeles Kings Philippe Boucher; Grant Fuhr; Denis Tsygurov | |
| February 15, 1995 | To Vancouver Canucks Josef Beranek | To Philadelphia Flyers Shawn Antoski | |
| February 16, 1995 | To Tampa Bay Lightning future considerations | To Pittsburgh Penguins Wendell Young | |
| February 16, 1995 | To Chicago Blackhawks Bob Wilkie; 5th-rd pick – 1997 entry draft (# 130 – Kyle Calder) | To Philadelphia Flyers Karl Dykhuis | |
| February 17, 1995 | To Los Angeles Kings 4th-rd pick – 1996 entry draft (WAS - # 85 – Justin Davis) | To Dallas Stars Mike Donnelly; 7th-rd pick – 1996 entry draft (# 166 – Eoin McInerney) | |
| February 22, 1995 | To Chicago Blackhawks Jeff Buchanan; Jim Cummins; Tom Tilley | To Tampa Bay Lightning Rich Sutter; Paul Ysebaert | |
| February 27, 1995 | To New Jersey Devils Neal Broten | To Dallas Stars Corey Millen | |
| February 27, 1995 | To San Jose Sharks 5th-rd pick – 1995 entry draft (# 130 – Michal Bros) | To Detroit Red Wings Bob Errey | |

1. Washington's fourth-round pick went to Dallas as the result of a trade on June 22, 1996, that sent a third-round pick in the 1996 entry draft to Washington in exchange for a third-round pick in the 1996 entry draft and this pick.
2. San Jose's fourth-round pick went to the Rangers as the result of a trade on June 21, 1997, that sent a fourth-round pick in the 1997 entry draft to San Jose in exchange for a sixth-round pick in the 1997 entry draft and this pick.

== March ==
| Date | | | References |
|---|---|---|---|
| March 3, 1995 | To San Jose Sharks conditional pick – 1998 entry draft^{1} (FLA - 5th-rd - # 117 – Jaroslav Spacek)^{2} | To Florida Panthers Johan Garpenlov | |
| March 3, 1995 | To Florida Panthers 4th-rd pick – 1995 entry draft (# 80 – Dave Duerden) | To New York Islanders Brent Severyn | |
| March 6, 1995 | To San Jose Sharks Craig Janney cash | To St. Louis Blues Jeff Norton conditional 5th-rd pick – 1997 entry draft^{3} (COL - # 55 – Rick Berry)^{4} | |
| March 8, 1995 | To Mighty Ducks of Anaheim Milos Holan | To Philadelphia Flyers Anatoli Semenov | |
| March 9, 1995 | To Mighty Ducks of Anaheim Dave Karpa | To Quebec Nordiques 4th-rd pick – 1997 entry draft (STL -# 98 – Jan Horacek)^{5} | |
| March 10, 1995 | To Vancouver Canucks Christian Ruuttu | To Chicago Blackhawks Murray Craven | |
| March 13, 1995 | To Edmonton Oilers Ryan McGill | To Philadelphia Flyers Brad Zavisha; 6th-rd pick – 1995 entry draft (# 135 – Jamie Sokolsky) | |
| March 13, 1995 | To Toronto Maple Leafs Rich Sutter | To Tampa Bay Lightning cash | |
| March 14, 1995 | To New Jersey Devils Shawn Chambers; Danton Cole | To Tampa Bay Lightning Ben Hankinson; Alexander Semak | |
| March 23, 1995 | To Hartford Whalers Glen Featherstone; Michael Stewart; 1st-rd pick – 1995 entry draft (# 13 – Jean-Sebastien Giguere); 4th-rd pick – 1996 entry draft (# 104 – Steve Wasylko) | To New York Rangers Pat Verbeek | |
| March 23, 1995 | To San Jose Sharks Kevin Miller | To New York Islanders Todd Elik | |
| March 23, 1995 | To Quebec Nordiques Francois Groleau | To Calgary Flames Ed Ward | |
| March 23, 1995 | To Vancouver Canucks 5th-rd pick – 1997 entry draft (# 114 – David Darguzas) | To Tampa Bay Lightning Adrien Plavsic | |
| March 27, 1995 | To Los Angeles Kings Arto Blomsten | To Winnipeg Jets 8th-rd pick – 1995 entry draft (# 189 – Fredrik Loven) conditional pick – 1995 entry draft^{6} | |

1. Conditions of this draft pick are unknown.
2. Florida's conditional pick was re-acquired as the result of a trade on November 13, 1997, that sent Dave Lowry and a first-round pick in the 1998 entry draft to San Jose in exchange for Viktor Kozlov and this pick.
3. Conditions of this draft pick are unknown.
4. St. Louis' third-round pick went to Colorado as the result of a trade on May 30, 1997, that sent Brent Johnson to St. Louis in exchange for a conditional third-round picks in the 1998 entry draft and this pick. Conditions of the draft pick are unknown.
5. Quebec's fourth-round pick went to St. Louis as the result of a trade on June 21, 1997, that sent a third-round pick in the 1997 entry draft and a fifth-round pick in the 1998 entry draft to Colorado in exchange for a fourth-round pick in the 1997 entry draft and this pick. Quebec relocated to Denver and became the Colorado Avalanche after the 1994–95 NHL season.
6. Conditions of this draft pick are unknown and no pick was taken.

== April ==
- Trading Deadline: April 7, 1995

| Date | | | References |
|---|---|---|---|
| April 3, 1995 | To New Jersey Devils 3rd-rd pick – 1995 entry draft (# 78 – David Gosselin) | To Detroit Red Wings Vyacheslav Fetisov | |
| April 4, 1995 | To Mighty Ducks of Anaheim Mike Sillinger; Jason York | To Detroit Red Wings Mark Ferner; Stu Grimson; 6th-rd pick – 1996 entry draft (# 144 – Magnus Nilsson) | |
| April 5, 1995 | To Montreal Canadiens Vladimir Malakhov; Pierre Turgeon | To New York Islanders Craig Darby; Kirk Muller; Mathieu Schneider | |
| April 6, 1995 | To Toronto Maple Leafs Paul DiPietro | To Montreal Canadiens conditional pick – 1996 entry draft^{1} (4th-rd - # 92 – Kim Staal) | |
| April 6, 1995 | To Toronto Maple Leafs 6th-rd pick – 1996 entry draft (# 148 – Chris Bogas) | To Calgary Flames Nikolai Borschevsky | |
| April 6, 1995 | To Toronto Maple Leafs Benoit Hogue; 3rd-rd pick - 1995 entry draft (# 54 – Ryan Pepperall); 5th-rd pick - 1996 entry draft # 111 – Brandon Sugden) | To New York Islanders Eric Fichaud | |
| April 6, 1995 | To Chicago Blackhawks Denis Savard | To Tampa Bay Lightning 6th-rd pick – 1996 entry draft (# 157 – Xavier Delisle) | |
| April 7, 1995 | To Toronto Maple Leafs Gord Kruppke | To Detroit Red Wings future considerations | |
| April 7, 1995 | To Dallas Stars Greg Adams; Dan Kesa; 5th-rd pick – 1995 entry draft (LAK - # 118 – Jason Morgan)^{2} | To Vancouver Canucks Russ Courtnall | |
| April 7, 1995 | To Dallas Stars 8th-rd pick – 1995 entry draft (# 202 – Sergei Luchinkin) | To Calgary Flames Alan May | |
| April 7, 1995 | To San Jose Sharks 6th-rd pick – 1995 entry draft (# 140 – Timo Hakanen) | To Florida Panthers Gaetan Duchesne | |
| April 7, 1995 | To St. Louis Blues 9th-rd pick – 1995 entry draft (# 209 – Libor Zabransky) | To Ottawa Senators Daniel Laperriere; 9th-rd pick – 1995 entry draft (# 231 – Erik Kaminski) | |
| April 7, 1995 | To Boston Bruins Craig Billington | To Ottawa Senators 8th-rd pick – 1995 entry draft (# 184 – Ray Schultz) | |
| April 7, 1995 | To Quebec Nordiques Bill Huard | To Ottawa Senators rights to Mika Stromberg; 4th-rd pick – 1995 entry draft (# 103 – Kevin Boyd) | |
| April 7, 1995 | To Pittsburgh Penguins Norm Maciver; Troy Murray | To Ottawa Senators Martin Straka | |
| April 7, 1995 | To Buffalo Sabres Garry Galley | To Philadelphia Flyers Petr Svoboda | |
| April 7, 1995 | To Buffalo Sabres Scott Pearson | To Edmonton Oilers Ken Sutton | |
| April 7, 1995 | To Vancouver Canucks Corey Hirsch | To New York Rangers Nathan LaFayette | |
| April 7, 1995 | To Winnipeg Jets Ed Olczyk | To New York Rangers 5th-rd pick – 1995 entry draft (# 110 – Alexei Vasiliev) | |
| April 7, 1995 | To Winnipeg Jets Greg Brown | To Pittsburgh Penguins cash | |
| April 7, 1995 | To Toronto Maple Leafs Grant Jennings | To Pittsburgh Penguins Drake Berehowsky | |
| April 7, 1995 | To Vancouver Canucks Roman Oksiuta | To Edmonton Oilers Jiri Slegr | |
| April 7, 1995 | To Toronto Maple Leafs Tie Domi | To Winnipeg Jets Mike Eastwood; 3rd-rd pick – 1995 entry draft (# 67 – Brad Isbister) | |
| April 7, 1995 | To Washington Capitals Mike Eagles; Igor Ulanov | To Winnipeg Jets 3rd-rd pick – 1995 entry draft (DAL – # 69 – Sergei Gusev)^{3} 5th-rd pick – 1995 entry draft (# 121 – Brian Elder) | |
| April 7, 1995 | To Calgary Flames Rick Tabaracci | To Washington Capitals 5th-rd pick – 1995 entry draft (# 124 – Joel Cort) | |
| April 7, 1995 | To Vancouver Canucks Bogdan Savenko; 3rd-rd pick – 1995 entry draft (# 61 – Larry Courville) | To Chicago Blackhawks Gerald Diduck | |

1. Conditions of this draft pick are unknown.
2. Dallas' fifth-round pick went to Los Angeles as the result of a trade on June 7, 1995, that sent Jeff Mitchell to Dallas in exchange for this pick.
3. Winnipeg's third-round pick went to Dallas as the result of a trade on July 8, 1995, that sent a second-round pick in the 1995 entry draft to Winnipeg in exchange for this pick.

== See also ==
- 1994 NHL entry draft
- 1994 in sports
- 1995 in sports
