= 1996 NHL entry draft =

1996 North American ice hockey draft

General information
- Date: June 22, 1996
- Location: Kiel Center; St. Louis, Missouri, U.S.

Overview
- 241 total selections in 9 rounds
- First selection: (Canada) Chris Phillips (Ottawa Senators)
- Hall of Famers: 1: D Zdeno Chara

The 1996 NHL entry draft was the 34th draft for the National Hockey League. It was held at the Kiel Center in St. Louis on June 22, 1996.

It is considered one of the weakest NHL entry drafts ever, with just one (Zdeno Chara, seven times) of the 241 players drafted ever being chosen for a year-end NHL All-Star team. Similarly, (as of 2025) Chara is the only player from this draft to be elected to the Hockey Hall of Fame.

The last active player in the NHL from this draft class was Zdeno Chara, who retired after the 2021–22 season.

== Selections by round ==
Club teams are located in North America unless otherwise noted.

=== Round one ===
= NHL All-Star team ·	= NHL All-Star (Note: Players are identified as an All-Star if they were selected for the All-Star game at any time in their career.) ·	= NHL All-Star and NHL All-Star team ·	= Hall of Famers

#	Player	Nationality	NHL team	College/junior/club team
1	Chris Phillips (D)	Canada	Ottawa Senators	Prince Albert Raiders (WHL)
2	Andrei Zyuzin (D)	Russia	San Jose Sharks	Salavat Yulaev Ufa (Russia)
3	Jean-Pierre Dumont (RW)	Canada	New York Islanders	Val-d'Or Foreurs (QMJHL)
4	Alexander Volchkov (LW)	Russia	Washington Capitals (from Los Angeles)^{1}	Barrie Colts (OHL)
5	Ric Jackman (D)	Canada	Dallas Stars	Sault Ste. Marie Greyhounds (OHL)
6	Boyd Devereaux (C)	Canada	Edmonton Oilers	Kitchener Rangers (OHL)
7	Erik Rasmussen (C)	United States	Buffalo Sabres	University of Minnesota (WCHA)
8	Johnathan Aitken (D)	Canada	Boston Bruins (from Hartford)^{2}	Medicine Hat Tigers (WHL)
9	Ruslan Salei (D)	Belarus	Mighty Ducks of Anaheim	Las Vegas Thunder (IHL)
10	Lance Ward (D)	Canada	New Jersey Devils	Red Deer Rebels (WHL)
11	Dan Focht (D)	Canada	Phoenix Coyotes	Tri-City Americans (WHL)
12	Josh Holden (C)	Canada	Vancouver Canucks	Regina Pats (WHL)
13	Derek Morris (D)	Canada	Calgary Flames	Regina Pats (WHL)
14	Marty Reasoner (C)	United States	St. Louis Blues (from St. Louis via Edmonton)^{3}	Boston College (Hockey East)
15	Dainius Zubrus (RW)	Lithuania	Philadelphia Flyers (from Toronto)^{4}	Pembroke Lumber Kings (COJHL)
16	Mario Larocque (D)	Canada	Tampa Bay Lightning	Hull Olympiques (QMJHL)
17	Jaroslav Svejkovsky (RW)	Czech Republic	Washington Capitals	Tri-City Americans (WHL)
18	Matt Higgins (C)	Canada	Montreal Canadiens	Moose Jaw Warriors (WHL)
19	Matthieu Descoteaux (D)	Canada	Edmonton Oilers (from Boston)^{5}	Shawinigan Cataractes (QMJHL)
20	Marcus Nilson (LW)	Sweden	Florida Panthers	Djurgardens IF (Sweden)
21	Marco Sturm (LW)	Germany	San Jose Sharks (from Chicago)^{6}	Landshut EV (Germany)
22	Jeff Brown (D)	Canada	New York Rangers	Sarnia Sting (OHL)
23	Craig Hillier (G)	Canada	Pittsburgh Penguins	Ottawa 67's (OHL)
24	Daniel Briere (C)	Canada	Phoenix Coyotes (from Philadelphia via San Jose and Buffalo)^{7}	Drummondville Voltigeurs (QMJHL)
25	Peter Ratchuk (D)	United States	Colorado Avalanche	Shattuck-Saint Mary's (USHS–MN)
26	Jesse Wallin (D)	Canada	Detroit Red Wings	Red Deer Rebels (WHL)

1. Los Angeles' first-round pick went to Washington as the result of a trade on July 8, 1995 that sent Byron Dafoe and Dmitri Khristich to Los Angeles in exchange for a fourth-round pick in the 1996 Entry Draft and this pick.
2. Hartford's first-round pick went to Boston as the result of a trade on August 26, 1994 that sent Glen Wesley to Hartford in exchange for first-round picks of the 1996 entry draft and the 1997 entry draft along with this pick.
3. St. Louis' first-round pick was re-acquired as the result of a trade with Edmonton on August 4, 1995 that sent Curtis Joseph and the rights to Mike Grier to Edmonton in exchange a first-round pick in the 1997 entry draft and this pick.
  Edmonton previously acquired this pick and a first-round pick in the 1997 entry draft as compensation on July 28, 1995 after St. Louis signed free agent Shayne Corson.
4. Toronto's first-round pick went to Philadelphia as the result of a trade on August 30, 1995 that sent Dmitry Yushkevich and a second-round pick in the 1996 Entry Draft to Toronto in exchange for a fourth-round pick in the 1996 Entry Draft, a second-round pick in the 1997 entry draft and this pick.
5. Boston's first-round pick went to Edmonton as the result of a trade on January 11, 1996 that sent Bill Ranford to Boston in exchange for Mariusz Czerkawski, the rights to Sean Brown and this pick.
6. Chicago's first-round pick went to San Jose as the result of a trade on June 22, 1996 that sent two second-round picks (# 31 and # 46 overall) in the 1996 Entry Draft to Chicago in exchange for this pick.
7. Buffalo's acquired first-round pick went to Winnipeg as the result of a trade on February 15, 1996 that sent Michal Grosek and Darryl Shannon to Buffalo in exchange for Craig Muni and this pick. Winnipeg relocated to Phoenix after the 1995–96 NHL season.
  Buffalo previously acquired this pick as the result of a trade on November 16, 1995 that sent Doug Bodger to San Jose in exchange for Vaclav Varada, a fourth-round pick in the 1996 Entry Draft, rights to Martin Spanhel and this pick.
  San Jose previously acquired this pick as the result of a trade on November 16, 1995 that sent Pat Falloon to Philadelphia in exchange for a fourth-round pick in the 1996 Entry Draft, rights to Martin Spanhel and this pick.

=== Round two ===
#	Player	Nationality	NHL team	College/junior/club team
27	Cory Sarich (D)	Canada	Buffalo Sabres (from Ottawa via St. Louis)^{1}	Saskatoon Blades (WHL)
28	Pavel Skrbek (D)	Czech Republic	Pittsburgh Penguins (from San Jose via New Jersey)^{2}	Poldi Kladno (Czech Republic)
29	Dan LaCouture (LW)	United States	New York Islanders	Enfield Jr. Whalers (EJHL)
30	Josh Green (C)	Canada	Los Angeles Kings	Medicine Hat Tigers (WHL)
31	Remi Royer (D)	Canada	Chicago Blackhawks (from Dallas via Phoenix and San Jose)^{3}	Saint-Hyacinthe Laser (QMJHL)
32	Chris Hajt (D)	Canada	Edmonton Oilers	Guelph Storm (OHL)
33	Darren Van Oene (LW)	Canada	Buffalo Sabres	Brandon Wheat Kings (WHL)
34	Trevor Wasyluk (LW)	Canada	Hartford Whalers	Medicine Hat Tigers (WHL)
35	Matt Cullen (C)	United States	Mighty Ducks of Anaheim	St. Cloud State University (WCHA)
36	Marek Posmyk (D)	Czech Republic	Toronto Maple Leafs (from New Jersey)^{4}	Dukla Jihlava (Czech Republic)
37	Marian Cisar (RW)	Slovakia	Los Angeles Kings (from Phoenix)^{5}	Slovan Bratislava (Slovakia)
38	Wes Mason (LW)	Canada	New Jersey Devils (from Vancouver)^{6}	Sarnia Sting (OHL)
39	Travis Brigley (LW)	Canada	Calgary Flames	Lethbridge Hurricanes (WHL)
40	Steve Begin (C)	Canada	Calgary Flames (from St. Louis)^{7}	Val-d'Or Foreurs (QMJHL)
41	Josh DeWolf (D)	United States	New Jersey Devils (from Toronto via Pittsburgh)^{8}	Twin Cities Vulcans (USHL)
42	Jeff Paul (D)	Canada	Chicago Blackhawks (from Tampa Bay)^{9}	Niagara Falls Thunder (OHL)
43	Jan Bulis (C)	Czech Republic	Washington Capitals	Barrie Colts (OHL)
44	Mathieu Garon (G)	Canada	Montreal Canadiens	Victoriaville Tigres (QMJHL)
45	Henry Kuster (RW)	Canada	Boston Bruins	Medicine Hat Tigers (WHL)
46	Geoff Peters (C)	Canada	Chicago Blackhawks (from Florida via San Jose)^{10}	Niagara Falls Thunder (OHL)
47	Pierre Dagenais (LW)	Canada	New Jersey Devils (from Chicago via Tampa Bay)^{11}	Moncton Alpines (QMJHL)
48	Daniel Goneau (LW)	Canada	New York Rangers	Granby Predateurs (QMJHL)
49	Colin White (D)	Canada	New Jersey Devils (from Pittsburgh)^{12}	Hull Olympiques (QMJHL)
50	Francis Larivee (G)	Canada	Toronto Maple Leafs (from Philadelphia)^{13}	Laval Titan Collège Français (QMJHL)
51	Yuri Babenko (C)	Russia	Colorado Avalanche	Krylya Sovetov (Russia)
52	Aren Miller (G)	Canada	Detroit Red Wings	Spokane Chiefs (WHL)

1. St. Louis' second-round pick went to Buffalo as the result of a trade on March 20, 1996 that sent Yuri Khmylev and an eighth-round pick in the 1996 Entry Draft to St. Louis in exchange for Jean-Luc Grand-Pierre, a third-round pick in the 1997 entry draft and this pick.
  St. Louis previously acquired this pick as the result of a trade on August 4, 1995 that sent Steve Duchesne to Hartford in exchange for this pick.
2. New Jersey'a second-round pick went to Pittsburgh as the result of a trade on June 22, 1996 that sent two second-round picks in the 1996 Entry Draft (# 41 and # 49 overall) to New Jersey in exchange for this pick.
  New Jersey previously acquired this pick as the result of a trade on November 15, 1995 that sent Chris Terreri to San Jose in exchange for this pick.
3. San Jose's second-round pick went to Chicago as the result of a trade on June 22, 1996 that sent a first-round pick in the 1996 Entry Draft to San Jose in exchange for a second-round pick in the 1996 Entry Draft (# 46 overall) and this pick.
  San Jose previously acquired this pick as the result of a trade on March 18, 1996 that sent Craig Janney to Winnipeg in exchange for Darren Turcotte and this pick.
  Winnipeg previously acquired this pick as the result of a trade on July 8, 1995 that sent a third-round pick in the 1995 entry draft to Dallas in exchange for this pick.
4. New Jersey's second-round pick went to Toronto as the result of a trade on March 13, 1996 that sent Dave Andreychuk to New Jersey in exchange for Toronto's option of a fourth-round pick in the 1998 entry draft or third-round pick in the 1999 entry draft and this pick.
5. Phoenix's second-round pick went to Los Angeles as the result of a trade on August 8, 1994 that sent Brent Thompson and cash to Winnipeg in exchange for rights to Ruslan Batyrshin and this pick. Winnipeg also had an option to swap 6th-rd picks in the 1996 Entry Draft. Winnipeg relocated to Phoenix after the 1995–96 NHL season.
6. Vancouver's second-round pick went to New Jersey as the result of a trade on November 23, 1995 that sent Esa Tikkanen to Vancouver in exchange for this pick.
7. St. Louis' second-round pick went to Calgary as the result of a trade on July 4, 1994 that sent Al MacInnis and a fourth-round pick in the 1997 entry draft to St. Louis in exchange for Phil Housley, a second-round pick in the 1997 entry draft and this pick.
8. Pittsburgh's second-round pick went to New Jersey as the result of a trade on June 22, 1996 that sent a second-round pick in the 1996 Entry Draft (# 28 overall) to Pittsburgh in exchange for a second-round pick in the 1996 Entry Draft (# 49 overall) and this pick.
  Pittsburgh previously acquired this pick as the result of a trade on July 8, 1995 that sent Larry Murphy to Toronto in exchange for Dmitri Mironov and this pick.
9. Tampa Bay's second-round pick went to Chicago as the result of a trade on March 20, 1996 that sent Patrick Poulin, Igor Ulanov and a second-round pick in the 1996 Entry Draft (# 47 overall) to Tampa Bay in exchange for Enrico Ciccone and this pick.
10. San Jose's second-round pick went to Chicago as the result of a trade on June 22, 1996 that sent a first-round pick in the 1996 Entry Draft (# 21 overall) to San Jose in exchange for a second-round pick in the 1996 Entry Draft (# 31 overall) and this pick.
  San Jose previously acquired this pick as the result of a trade on March 16, 1996 that sent Ray Sheppard and a fourth-round pick in the a fourth-round pick in the 1996 Entry Draft to Florida in exchange for a fourth-round pick in the 1996 Entry Draft and this pick.
11. Tampa Bay's second-round pick went to New Jersey as the result of a trade on June 22, 1996 that sent Corey Schwab to Tampa Bay in exchange for Jeff Reese, an eighth-round pick in the 1996 Entry Draft and this pick.
  Tampa Bay previously acquired this pick as the result of a trade on March 20, 1996 that sent Enrico Ciccone and a second-round pick in the 1996 Entry Draft (# 42 overall) to Chicago in exchange for Patrick Poulin, Igor Ulanov and this pick.
12. Pittsburgh's second-round pick went to New Jersey as the result of a trade on June 22, 1996 that sent a second-round pick in the 1996 Entry Draft (# 28 overall) to Pittsburgh in exchange for a second-round pick in the 1996 Entry Draft (# 41 overall) and this pick.
13. Philadelphia's second-round pick went to Toronto as the result of a trade on August 30, 1995 that sent a first-round and a fourth-round picks in the 1996 Entry Draft with a second-round pick in the 1997 entry draft to Philadelphia in exchange for Dmitry Yushkevich and this pick.

=== Round three ===
#	Player	Nationality	NHL team	College/junior/club team
53	Eric Naud (LW)	Canada	Boston Bruins (from Ottawa)^{1}	Saint-Hyacinthe Laser (QMJHL)
54	Francois Methot (C)	Canada	Buffalo Sabres (compensatory)^{2}	Saint-Hyacinthe Laser (QMJHL)
55	Terry Friesen (G)	Canada	San Jose Sharks	Swift Current Broncos (WHL)
56	Zdeno Chara (D)	Slovakia	New York Islanders	Dukla Trencin (Slovakia)
57	Greg Phillips (C)	Canada	Los Angeles Kings	Saskatoon Blades (WHL)
58	Sergei Zimakov (D)	Russia	Washington Capitals (from Dallas)^{3}	Krylya Sovetov (Russia)
59	Tom Poti (D)	United States	Edmonton Oilers	Cushing Academy (USHS–MA)
60	Chris Allen (D)	Canada	Florida Panthers (from Buffalo)^{4}	Kingston Frontenacs (OHL)
61	Andrei Petrunin (RW)	Russia	Hartford Whalers	CSKA Moscow (Russia)
62	Per-Anton Lundstrom (D)	Sweden	Phoenix Coyotes (from Anaheim)^{5}	MODO (Sweden)
63	Scott Parker (RW)	United States	New Jersey Devils	Kelowna Rockets (WHL)
64	Chester Gallant (RW)	Canada	Philadelphia Flyers (from Phoenix)^{6}	Niagara-Falls Thunder (OHL)
65	Oleg Kvasha (C)	Russia	Florida Panthers (from Vancouver)^{7}	CSKA Moscow (Russia)
66	Mike Lankshear (D)	Canada	Toronto Maple Leafs (from Calgary)^{8}	Guelph Storm (OHL)
67	Gordie Dwyer (LW)	Canada	St. Louis Blues	Beauport Harfangs (QMJHL)
68	Konstantin Kalmikov (LW)	Ukraine	Toronto Maple Leafs	Detroit Falcons (CoHL)
69	Curtis Tipler (RW)	Canada	Tampa Bay Lightning	Regina Pats (WHL)
70	Jon Sim (LW)	Canada	Dallas Stars (from Washington)^{9}	Sarnia Sting (OHL)
71	Arron Asham (RW)	Canada	Montreal Canadiens	Red Deer Rebels (WHL)
72	Boyd Kane (LW)	Canada	Pittsburgh Penguins (from Boston)^{10}	Regina Pats (WHL)
73	Dmitri Vlasenkov (LW)	Russia	Calgary Flames (from Florida)^{11}	Torpedo Yaroslavl (Russia)
74	David Weninger (G)	Canada	Washington Capitals (from Chicago)^{12}	Michigan Technological University (WCHA)
75	Zenith Komarniski (D)	Canada	Vancouver Canucks (compensatory)^{13}	Tri-City Americans (WHL)
76	Dmitri Subbotin (LW)	Russia	New York Rangers	CSKA Moscow (Russia)
77	Borys Protsenko (RW)	Ukraine	Pittsburgh Penguins	Calgary Hitmen (WHL)
78	Shawn McNeil (C)	Canada	Washington Capitals (from Philadelphia via Colorado)^{14}	Kamloops Blazers (WHL)
79	Mark Parrish (RW)	United States	Colorado Avalanche	St. Cloud State University (WCHA)
80	Jason Doyle (RW)	Canada	Boston Bruins (from Detroit via Tampa Bay)^{15}	Sault Ste. Marie Greyhounds (WHL)

1. Ottawa's third-round pick went to Boston as the result of a trade on June 22, 1996 that sent Shawn McEachern to Boston in exchange for Trent McCleary and this pick.
2. Buffalo acquired this pick as compensation on September 8, 1995 after St. Louis signed free agent Dale Hawerchuk.
3. Dallas's third-round pick went to Washington as the result of a trade on June 22, 1996 that sent a third-round pick (# 70 overall) and a fourth-round pick in the 1996 Entry Draft to Dallas in exchange for this pick.
4. Buffalo's third-round pick went to Florida as the result of a trade on February 1, 1996 that sent Bob Boughner to Buffalo in exchange for this pick.
5. Anaheim's third-round pick went to Phoenix as the result of a trade on February 7, 1996 that sent Teemu Selanne, Marc Chouinard and a third-round pick in the 1996 Entry Draft to Anaheim in exchange for Chad Kilger, Oleg Tverdovsky and this pick. Winnipeg relocated to Phoenix after the 1995–96 NHL season.
6. Phoenix's third-round pick went to Philadelphia as the result of a trade on February 27, 1996 that sent Dominic Roussel to Winnipeg in exchange for Tim Cheveldae and this pick. Winnipeg relocated to Phoenix after the 1995–96 NHL season.
7. Vancouver's third-round pick went to Florida as the result of a trade on March 20, 1996 that sent Jesse Belanger to Vancouver in exchange for this pick.
8. Calgary's third-round pick went to Toronto as the result of a trade on June 22, 1996 that sent Dave Gagner to Calgary in exchange for this pick.
9. Washington's third-round pick went to Dallas as the result of a trade on June 22, 1996 that sent a third-round pick (# 58 overall) in the 1996 Entry Draft to Washington in exchange for fourth-round pick in the 1996 Entry Draft and this pick.
10. Boston's third-round pick went to Pittsburgh as the result of a trade on August 1, 1995 that sent Kevin Stevens and Shawn McEachern to Boston in exchange for Glen Murray, Bryan Smolinski and this pick.
11. Florida's third-round pick went to Calgary as the result of a trade on September 29, 1994 that sent Robert Svehla and Magnus Svensson to Philadelphia in exchange for a fourth-round pick in the 1997 entry draft and this pick.
12. Chicago's third-round pick went to Washington as the result of a trade on October 17, 1995 that sent the rights to Igor Ulanov to Chicago in exchange for this pick.
13. Vancouver acquired this pick as compensation on July 14, 1995 after St. Louis signed free agent Geoff Courtnall.
14. Colorado's third-round pick went to Washington as the result of a trade on July 12, 1995 that sent John Slaney to Colorado in exchange for this pick.
  Colorado's previously acquired this pick as the result of a trade on July 12, 1995 that sent Garth Snow to Philadelphia in exchange for a sixth-round pick in 1996 Entry Draft and this pick.
15. Tampa Bay's third-round pick went to Boston as the result of a trade on August 17, 1995 that sent David Shaw to Tampa Bay in exchange for this pick.
  Tampa Bay previously acquired this pick as the result of a trade on August 17, 1995 that sent Marc Bergevin and Ben Hankinson to Detroit in exchange for Shawn Burr and this pick.

=== Round four ===
#	Player	Nationality	NHL team	College/junior/club team
81	Antti-Jussi Niemi (D)	Finland	Ottawa Senators	Jokerit (Finland)
82	Joey Tetarenko (RW)	Canada	Florida Panthers (from San Jose)^{1}	Portland Winter Hawks (WHL)
83	Tyrone Garner (G)	Canada	New York Islanders	Oshawa Generals (OHL)
84	Mikael Simons (C)	Sweden	Los Angeles Kings (from Los Angeles via Toronto and Philadelphia)^{2}	Mora IK (Sweden)
85	Justin Davis (RW)	Canada	Washington Capitals (from Dallas via Los Angeles)^{3}	Kingston Frontenacs (OHL)
86	Jason Sessa (RW)	United States	Toronto Maple Leafs (from Edmonton)^{4}	Lake Superior State University (CCHA)
87	Kurt Walsh (RW)	Canada	Buffalo Sabres	Owen Sound Platers (OHL)
88	Craig MacDonald (C)	Canada	Hartford Whalers	Harvard University (ECAC)
89	Toni Lydman (D)	Finland	Calgary Flames (compensatory)^{5}	Reipas Lahti (Finland)
90	Mike Hurley (RW)	Canada	Dallas Stars (from Anaheim via Washington)^{6}	Tri-City Americans (WHL)
91	Josef Boumedienne (D)	Sweden	New Jersey Devils	Huddinge IK (Sweden)
92	Kim Staal (LW)	Denmark	Montreal Canadiens (from Phoenix via Anaheim and Toronto)^{7}	Malmö IF (Sweden)
93	Jonas Soling (LW)	Sweden	Vancouver Canucks	Huddinge IK (Sweden)
94	Christian Lefebvre (D)	Canada	Calgary Flames	Granby Predateurs (QMJHL)
95	Jon Zukiwsky (C)	Canada	St. Louis Blues	Red Deer Rebels (WHL)
96	Eric Belanger (C)	Canada	Los Angeles Kings (from Toronto)^{8}	Beauport Harfangs (QMJHL)
97	Andrei Petrakov (LW)	Russia	St. Louis Blues (from Tampa Bay)^{9}	Avtomobilist Yekaterinburg (Russia)
98	Ben Storey (D)	Canada	Colorado Avalanche (from Washington)^{10}	Harvard University (ECAC)
99	Etienne Drapeau (C)	Canada	Montreal Canadiens	Beauport Harfangs (QMJHL)
100	Trent Whitfield (C)	Canada	Boston Bruins	Spokane Chiefs (WHL)
101	Josh MacNevin (D)	Canada	New Jersey Devils (compensatory)^{11}	Vernon Vipers (BCJHL)
102	Matt Bradley (RW)	Canada	San Jose Sharks (from Florida)^{12}	Kingston Frontenacs (OHL)
103	Vladimir Antipov (LW)	Russia	Toronto Maple Leafs (from Chicago via Phoenix)^{13}	Torpedo Yaroslavl (Russia)
104	Steve Wasylko (C)	Canada	Hartford Whalers (from New York Rangers)^{14}	Detroit Whalers (OHL)
105	Michal Rozsival (D)	Czech Republic	Pittsburgh Penguins	Dukla Jihlava (Czech.)
106	Mike Martone (D)	Canada	Buffalo Sabres (from Philadelphia via San Jose)^{15}	Peterborough Petes (OHL)
107	Randy Petruk (G)	Canada	Colorado Avalanche	Kamloops Blazers (WHL)
108	Johan Forsander (LW)	Sweden	Detroit Red Wings	HV71 (Sweden)

1. San Jose's fourth-round pick went to Florida as the result of a trade on March 16, 1996 that sent a second-round and a fourth-round pick (# 102 overall) in the 1996 Entry Draft to San Jose in exchange for Ray Sheppard and this pick.
2. Los Angeles' fourth-round pick was re-acquired as the result of a trade with Philadelphia on March 19, 1996 that sent John Druce and a seventh-round pick in the 1997 entry draft to Philadelphia in exchange for this pick.
  Philadelphia previously acquired this pick as the result of a trade on August 30, 1995 that sent Dmitry Yushkevich and a second-round pick in the 1996 Entry Draft to Toronto in exchange for a first-round pick in the 1996 Entry Draft, a second-round pick in the 1997 entry draft and this pick.
  Toronto previously acquired this pick as the result of a trade on July 11, 1994 that sent Yanic Perreault to Los Angeles in exchange for this pick.
3. Los Angeles' fourth-round pick went to Washington as the result of a trade on July 8, 1995 that sent Byron Dafoe and Dmitri Khristich to Los Angeles in exchange for a first-round pick in the 1996 Entry Draft and this pick.
  Los Angeles' previously acquired this pick as the result of a trade on February 17, 1995 that sent Mike Donnelly and seventh-round pick in 1996 Entry Draft to Dallas in exchange for this pick.
4. Edmonton's fourth-round pick went to Toronto as the result of a trade on December 4, 1995 that sent a third-round pick in the Kent Manderville to Edmonton in exchange for Peter White and this pick.
5. Calgary acquired this pick as compensation on July 31, 1995 after Philadelphia signed free agent Joel Otto.
6. Washington's acquired fourth-round pick went to Dallas as the result of a trade on June 22, 1996 that sent a third-round pick in the 1996 Entry Draft to Washington in exchange for third-round pick in the 1996 Entry Draft and this pick.
  Washington previously acquired this pick as the result of a trade on February 2, 1995 that sent Todd Krygier to Anaheim in exchange for this pick.
7. Toronto's acquired fourth-round pick went to Montreal as the result of a trade on April 6, 1995 that sent Paul DiPietro in exchange for this pick. At the time of the trade, it was for a conditional pick in the 1996 Entry Draft and the conditions of this draft pick are unknown.
  Toronto previously acquired this pick as the result of a trade on March 20, 1996 that sent Ken Baumgartner to Anaheim in exchange for this pick.
  Anaheim previously acquired this pick as the result of a trade on February 7, 1996 that sent Chad Kilger, Oleg Tverdovsky and a third-round pick in the 1996 Entry Draft to Winnipeg in exchange for Teemu Selanne, Marc Chouinard and this pick. Winnipeg relocated to Phoenix after the 1995–96 NHL season.
8. Toronto's' fourth-round pick went to Los Angeles as the result of a trade on October 3, 1994 that sent Kelly Fairchild, Guy Leveque, Shayne Toporowski and Dixon Ward to Toronto in exchange for Eric Lacroix, Chris Snell and this pick.
9. Tampa Bay's' fourth-round pick went to St. Louis as the result of a trade on January 28, 1993 that sent Jason Ruff, a fourth-round pick in 1994 entry draft, a fifth-round pick in 1995 entry draft and a sixth-round pick in 1996 Entry Draft to Tampa Bay in exchange for Doug Crossman, Basil McRae and this pick.
10. Washington's' fourth-round pick went to Colorado as the result of a trade on April 3, 1996 that sent Anson Carter to Washington in exchange for this pick.
11. New Jersey acquired this pick as compensation on September 28, 1995 after the Rangers signed free agent Bruce Driver.
12. Florida's fourth-round pick went to San Jose as the result of a trade on March 16, 1996 that sent Ray Sheppard and a fourth-round pick (# 82 overall) in the 1996 Entry Draft to Florida in exchange for a second-round pick in the 1996 Entry Draft and this pick.
13. Phoenix's' fourth-round pick went to Toronto as the result of a trade on June 22, 1996 that sent Mike Gartner to Phoenix in exchange for this pick.
  Phoenix previously acquired this pick as the result of a trade on March 20, 1996 that sent Ravil Gusmanov to Chicago in exchange for this pick.
14. The Rangers' first-round pick went to Hartford as the result of a trade on March 23, 1995 that sent Pat Verbeek to the Rangers in exchange for Glen Featherstone, Michael Stewart, a first-round in the 1995 entry draft and this pick.
15. San Jose's acquired fourth-round pick went to Buffalo as the result of a trade on November 16, 1995 that sent Doug Bodger to San Jose in exchange for Vaclav Varada, a first-round pick in the 1996 Entry Draft, rights to Martin Spanhel and this pick.
  San Jose previously acquired this pick as the result of a trade on November 16, 1995 that sent Pat Falloon to Philadelphia in exchange for a first-round pick in the 1996 Entry Draft, rights to Martin Spanhel and this pick.

=== Round five ===
#	Player	Nationality	NHL team	College/junior/club team
109	Andrew Berenzweig (D)	United States	New York Islanders (from Ottawa)^{1}	University of Michigan (CCHA)
110	Peter Cava (C)	Canada	Toronto Maple Leafs (from San Jose)^{2}	Sault Ste. Marie Greyhounds (OHL)
111	Brandon Sugden (RW)	Canada	Toronto Maple Leafs (from New York Islanders)^{3}	London Knights (OHL)
112	Ryan Christie (LW)	Canada	Dallas Stars (from Los Angeles)^{4}	Owen Sound Platers (OHL)
113	Yevgeni Tsybuk (D)	Russia	Dallas Stars	Yaroslavl Torpedo (Russia)
114	Brian Urick (RW)	United States	Edmonton Oilers	University of Notre Dame (CCHA)
115	Alexei Tezikov (D)	Russia	Buffalo Sabres	Lada Togliatti (Russia)
116	Mark McMahon (D)	Canada	Hartford Whalers	Kitchener Rangers (OHL)
117	Brendan Buckley (D)	United States	Mighty Ducks of Anaheim	Boston College (Hockey East)
118	Glenn Crawford (C)	Canada	New Jersey Devils	Windsor Spitfires (OHL)
119	Richard Lintner (D)	Slovakia	Phoenix Coyotes	Dukla Trencin Jr. (Slovakia)
120	Jesse Black (D)	Canada	Los Angeles Kings (compensatory)^{5}	Niagara Falls Thunder (OHL)
121	Tyler Prosofsky (C)	Canada	Vancouver Canucks	Kelowna Rockets (WHL)
122	Josef Straka (C)	Czech Republic	Calgary Flames	HC Litvínov (Czech Republic)
123	Peter Hogan (D)	Canada	Los Angeles Kings (from St. Louis)^{6}	Oshawa Generals (OHL)
124	Per-Ragnar Bergkvist (G)	Sweden	Philadelphia Flyers (from Toronto)^{7}	Leksands IF (Sweden)
125	Jason Robinson (D)	Canada	Tampa Bay Lightning	Niagara Falls Thunder (OHL)
126	Matt Lahey (LW)	Canada	Washington Capitals	Peterborough Petes (OHL)
127	Daniel Archambault (D)	Canada	Montreal Canadiens	Val-d'Or Foreurs (QMJHL)
128	Petr Sachl (C)	Czech Republic	New York Islanders (from Boston)^{8}	HC České Budějovice (Czech Republic)
129	Andrew Long (C)	Canada	Florida Panthers	Guelph Storm (OHL)
130	Andy Johnson (D)	Canada	Chicago Blackhawks	Peterborough Petes (OHL)
131	Colin Pepperall (LW)	Canada	New York Rangers	Niagara Falls Thunder (OHL)
132	Elias Abrahamsson (D)	Sweden	Boston Bruins (from Pittsburgh via San Jose)^{9}	Halifax Mooseheads (QMJHL)
133	Jesse Boulerice (RW)	United States	Philadelphia Flyers	Detroit Whalers (OHL)
134	Luke Curtin (LW)	United States	Colorado Avalanche	Kelowna Rockets (WHL)
135	Michal Podolka (G)	Czech Republic	Detroit Red Wings	Sault Ste. Marie Greyhounds (OHL)

1. Ottawa's' fifth-round pick went to the Islanders as the result of a trade on October 15, 1994 that sent Jason Zent to Ottawa in exchange for this pick.
2. San Jose's' fifth-round pick went to Toronto as the result of a trade on June 14, 1996 that sent Todd Gill to San Jose in exchange for Jamie Baker and this pick.
3. The Islanders' fifth-round pick went to Toronto as the result of a trade on April 6, 1995 that sent Eric Fichaud to the Islanders in exchange for Benoit Hogue, a third-round pick in the 1995 entry draft and this pick.
4. Los Angeles' fifth-round pick went to Dallas as the result of a trade on February 17, 1996 that sent Shane Churla and Doug Zmolek to Los Angeles in exchange for Darryl Sydor and this pick.
5. Los Angeles acquired this pick as compensation on July 14, 1995 after St. Louis signed free agent Grant Fuhr.
6. St. Louis' first-round pick went to Los Angeles as the result of a trade on February 27, 1996 that sent Wayne Gretzky to St. Louis in exchange for Craig Johnson, Patrice Tardif, Roman Vopat, a first-round pick of the 1997 entry draft and this pick.
7. Toronto's fifth-round pick went to Philadelphia as the result of a trade on July 8, 1995 that sent Rob Zettler to Toronto in exchange for this pick.
8. Boston's fifth-round pick went to the Islanders as the result of a trade on December 9, 1995 that sent Dean Chynoweth to Boston in exchange for this pick.
9. San Jose's fifth-round pick went to Boston as the result of a trade on June 21, 1996 that sent Al Iafrate to San Jose in exchange for Jeff Odgers and this pick.
  San Jose previously acquired this pick as the result of a trade on March 20, 1996 that sent Kevin Miller to Pittsburgh in exchange for this pick.

=== Round six ===
#	Player	Nationality	NHL team	College/junior/club team
136	Andreas Dackell (RW)	Sweden	Ottawa Senators	Brynas IF (Sweden)
137	Michel Larocque (G)	Germany	San Jose Sharks	Boston University (Hockey East)
138	Todd Miller (C)	Canada	New York Islanders	Sarnia Sting (OHL)
139	Robert Esche (G)	United States	Phoenix Coyotes (from Los Angeles)^{1}	Detroit Whalers (OHL)
140	Dmytro Yakushyn (D)	Ukraine	Toronto Maple Leafs (from Dallas)^{2}	Pembroke (COJHL)
141	Bryan Randall (C)	Canada	Edmonton Oilers	Medicine Hat Tigers (WHL)
142	Ryan Davis (RW)	Canada	Buffalo Sabres	Owen Sound Platers (OHL)
143	Aaron Baker (G)	Canada	Hartford Whalers	Tri-City Americans (WHL)
144	Magnus Nilsson (LW)	Sweden	Detroit Red Wings (from Anaheim)^{3}	IK Vita Hasten (Sweden)
145	Sean Ritchlin (RW)	United States	New Jersey Devils	University of Michigan (CCHA)
146	Brian Willsie (RW)	Canada	Colorado Avalanche (from Phoenix via Los Angeles)^{4}	Guelph Storm (OHL)
147	Nolan McDonald (G)	Canada	Vancouver Canucks	University of Vermont (Hockey East)
148	Chris Bogas (D)	United States	Toronto Maple Leafs (from Calgary)^{5}	Michigan State University (CCHA)
149	Blaine Russell (G)	Canada	Mighty Ducks of Anaheim (from St. Louis)^{6}	Prince Albert Raiders (WHL)
150	Peter Bergman (C)	Canada	Pittsburgh Penguins (compensatory)^{7}	Kamloops Blazers (WHL)
151	Lucio DeMartinis (LW)	Canada	Toronto Maple Leafs	Shawinigan Cataractes (QMJHL)
152	Nikolai Ignatov (D)	Russia	Tampa Bay Lightning (from Tampa Bay via St. Louis)^{8}	CSKA Moscow (Russia)
153	A. J. Van Bruggen (RW)	United States	Washington Capitals	Northern Michigan University (WCHA)
154	Brett Clark (D)	Canada	Montreal Canadiens	University of Maine (Hockey East)
155	Chris Lane (D)	Canada	Boston Bruins	Spokane Chiefs (WHL)
156	Gaetan Poirier (LW)	Canada	Florida Panthers	Merrimack College (Hockey East)
157	Xavier Delisle (C)	Canada	Tampa Bay Lightning (from Chicago)^{9}	Granby Predateurs (QMJHL)
158	Ola Sandberg (D)	Sweden	New York Rangers	Djurgardens IF (Sweden)
159	Stephen Wagner (G)	Canada	St. Louis Blues (from Pittsburgh)^{10}	Olds Grizzlys (AJHL)
160	Kai Fischer (G)	Germany	Colorado Avalanche (from Philadelphia)^{11}	Düsseldorfer EG (Germany)
161	Darren Mortier (C)	Canada	Buffalo Sabres (from Colorado)^{12}	Sarnia Sting (OHL)
162	Alexandre Jacques (C)	Canada	Detroit Red Wings	Shawinigan Cataractes (QMJHL)

1. Los Angeles' sixth-round pick went to Phoenix as the result of a trade on August 8, 1994 that sent rights to Ruslan Batyrshin and fourth-round pick in 1996 Entry Draft to Los Angeles in exchange for Brent Thompson and cash. Winnipeg also had an option to swap 6th-rd picks in the 1996 Entry Draft (this pick). Winnipeg relocated to Phoenix after the 1995–96 NHL season.
2. Dallas' sixth-round pick went to Torontp as the result of a trade on January 28, 1996 that sent Benoit Hogue and Randy Wood to Los Dallas in exchange for Dave Gagner and this pick.
3. Anaheim's sixth-round pick went to Detroit as the result of a trade on April 4, 1995 that sent Mike Sillinger and Jason York to Anaheim in exchange for Mark Ferner, Stu Grimson and this pick.
4. Los Angeles' sixth-round pick went to Colorado as the result of a trade on December 28, 1995 that sent John Slaney to Los Angeles in exchange for this pick.
  Phoenix previously acquired this pick as the result of a trade with Los Angeles on August 8, 1994 that sent Brent Thompson and cash and to Winnipeg in exchange for rights to Ruslan Batyrshin and fourth-round pick in the 1996 Entry Draft. Winnipeg also had an option to swap 6th-rd picks in the 1996 Entry Draft (this pick). Winnipeg relocated to Phoenix after the 1995–96 NHL season.
5. Calgary's sixth-round pick went to Toronto as the result of a trade on April 6, 1995 that sent Nikolai Borschevsky to Calgary in exchange for this pick.
6. St. Louis' sixth-round pick went to Anaheim as the result of a trade on July 8, 1995 that sent a sixth-round pick in the 1995 entry draft to St. Louis in exchange for this pick.
7. Pittsburgh acquired this pick as compensation on September 13, 1995 after Boston signed free agent Joe Mullen.
8. Tampa Bay's sixth-round pick was re-acquired as the result of a trade with St. Louis on January 28, 1993, that sent Basil McRae, Doug Crossman and a fourth-round pick in the 1996 Entry Draft to St. Louis in exchange for Jason Ruff, Tampa Bay's fourth-round pick in 1994 entry draft, fifth-round pick in 1995 entry draft and this pick.
  Tampa Bay previously acquired this pick as the result of a trade with St. Louis on June 19, 1993 that sent Pat Jablonski, Darin Kimble, Rob Robinson and Steve Tuttle to Tampa Bay in exchange for Tampa Bay's fourth-round pick in the 1994 entry draft, fifth-round pick in the 1995 entry draft and this pick.
9. Chicago's sixth-round pick went to Tampa Bay as the result of a trade on April 6, 1995 that sent Denis Savard to Chicago in exchange for this pick.
10. Pittsburgh's sixth-round pick went to St. Louis as the result of a trade on March 20, 1996 that sent Jean-Jacques Daigneault to Colorado in exchange for this pick.
11. Philadelphia's sixth-round pick went to Colorado as the result of a trade on July 12, 1995 that sent Garth Snow to Philadelphia in exchange for a third-round pick in 1996 Entry Draft and this pick.
12. Colorado's sixth-round pick went to Buffalo as the result of a trade on March 20, 1996 that sent Dave Hannan to Colorado in exchange for this pick.

=== Round seven ===
#	Player	Nationality	NHL team	College/junior/club team
163	Francois Hardy (D)	Canada	Ottawa Senators	Val-d'Or Foreurs (QMJHL)
164	Jake Deadmarsh (D)	Canada|	San Jose Sharks	Kamloops Blazers (WHL)
165	J. R. Prestifilippo (G)	United States	New York Islanders	Hotchkiss School (USHS–CT)
166	Eoin McInerney (G)	Canada	Dallas Stars (from Los Angeles)^{1}	London Knights (OHL)
167	Dan Hinote (RW)	United States	Colorado Avalanche (from Dallas)^{2}	United States Military Academy (NCAA Independent)
168	David Bernier (RW)	Canada	Edmonton Oilers	Saint-Hyacinthe Laser (QMJHL)
169	Daniel Corso (C)	Canada	St. Louis Blues (from Buffalo)^{3}	Victoriaville Tigres (QMJHL)
170	Brandon Lafrance (RW)	Canada	Edmonton Oilers (from Pittsburgh; compensatory)^{4}	Ohio State University (CCHA)
171	Greg Kuznik (D)	Canada	Hartford Whalers	Seattle Thunderbirds (WHL)
172	Timo Ahmaoja (D)	Finland	Mighty Ducks of Anaheim	JYP (Finland)
173	Daryl Andrews (D)	Canada	New Jersey Devils	Melfort Mustangs (SJHL)
174	Trevor Letowski (RW)	Canada	Phoenix Coyotes	Sarnia Sting (OHL)
175	Clint Cabana (D)	Canada	Vancouver Canucks	Medicine Hat Tigers (WHL)
176	Samuel Pahlsson (C)	Sweden	Colorado Avalanche (from Calgary)^{5}	MODO (Sweden)
177	Reed Low (RW)	Canada	St. Louis Blues	Moose Jaw Warriors (WHL)
178	Reggie Berg (C)	United States	Toronto Maple Leafs	University of Minnesota (WCHA)
179	Pavel Kubina (D)	Czech Republic	Tampa Bay Lightning	HC Vitkovice (Czech.)
180	Michael Anderson (RW)	United States	Washington Capitals	University of Minnesota (WCHA)
181	Timo Vertala (LW)	Finland	Montreal Canadiens	JYP (Finland)
182	Thomas Brown (D)	Canada	Boston Bruins	Sarnia Sting (OHL)
183	Alexandre Couture (D)	Canada	Florida Panthers	Victoriaville Tigres (QMJHL)
184	Mike Vellinga (D)	Canada	Chicago Blackhawks	Guelph Storm (OHL)
185	Jeff Dessner (D)	United States	New York Rangers	The Taft School (USHS–CT)
186	Eric Meloche (RW)	Canada	Pittsburgh Penguins	Cornwall Colts (COJHL)
187	Roman Malov (LW)	Russia	Philadelphia Flyers	Avangard Omsk (Russia)
188	Roman Pylner (C)	Czech Republic	Colorado Avalanche	HC Litvínov Jr. (Czech Republic)
189	Colin Beardsmore (C)	Canada	Detroit Red Wings	North Bay Centennials (OHL)

1. Los Angeles' seventh-round pick went to Dallas as the result of a trade on February 17, 1995 that sent a fourth-round pick in 1996 Entry Draft to Los Angeles in exchange for Mike Donnelly and this pick.
2. Dallas' seventh-round pick went to Colorado as the result of a trade on January 31, 1995 that sent Iain Fraser to Dallas in exchange for this pick.
3. Buffalo's seventh-round pick went to St. Louis as the result of a trade on March 19, 1996 that sent Denis Hamel to Buffalo in exchange for Charlie Huddy and this pick.
4. Pittsburgh's acquired seventh-round pick went to Edmonton as the result of a trade on June 22, 1996 that sent Tyler Wright to Pittsburgh in exchange for this pick.
  Pittsburgh previously acquired this pick as compensation on August 31, 1995 after Philadelphia signed free agent Kjell Samuelsson.
5. Calgary's seventh-round pick went to Colorado as the result of a trade on November 1, 1995 that sent Claude Lapointe to Calgary in exchange for this pick.

=== Round eight ===
#	Player	Nationality	NHL team	College/junior/club team
190	Steve Valiquette (G)	Canada	Los Angeles Kings (from Ottawa)^{1}	Sudbury Wolves (OHL)
191	Cory Cyrenne (C)	Canada	San Jose Sharks	Brandon Wheat Kings (WHL)
192	Evgeny Korolev (D)	Russia	New York Islanders	Peterborough Petes (OHL)
193	Kai Nurminen (LW)	Finland	Los Angeles Kings	HV71 (Sweden)
194	Joel Kwiatkowski (D)	Canada	Dallas Stars	Prince George Cougars (WHL)
195	Fernando Pisani (RW)	Canada	Edmonton Oilers	St. Albert Saints (AJHL)
196	Andrej Podkonicky (C)	Slovakia	St. Louis Blues (from Buffalo)^{2}	ZTK Zvolen (Slovakia)
197	Kevin Marsh (LW)	Canada	Hartford Whalers	Calgary Hitmen (WHL)
198	Kevin Kellett (D)	Canada	Mighty Ducks of Anaheim	Prince Albert Raiders (WHL)
199	Willie Mitchell (D)	Canada	New Jersey Devils	Melfort Mustangs (SJHL)
200	Nick Lent (RW)	United States	Phoenix Coyotes	Omaha Lancers (USHL)
201	Jeff Scissons (C)	Canada	Vancouver Canucks	Vernon Vipers (BCJHL)
202	Ryan Wade (RW)	Canada	Calgary Flames	Kelowna Rockets (WHL)
203	Anthony Hutchins (C)	United States	St. Louis Blues	Lawrence Academy (USHS–MA)
204	Tomas Kaberle (D)	Czech Republic	Toronto Maple Leafs	Poldi Kladno (Czech.)
205	Jason Bertsch (RW)	Canada	New Jersey Devils (from Tampa Bay)^{3}	Spokane Chiefs (WHL)
206	Oleg Orekhovsky (D)	Russia	Washington Capitals	Dynamo Moscow (Russia)
207	Mattia Baldi (LW)	Switzerland	Montreal Canadiens	HC Ambri-Piotta (Switzerland)
208	Bob Prier (RW)	Canada	Boston Bruins	St. Lawrence University (ECAC)
209	Denis Khlopotnov (G)	Russia	Florida Panthers	CSKA Moscow (Russia)
210	Chris Twerdun (D)	Canada	Chicago Blackhawks	Moose Jaw Warriors (WHL)
211	Ryan McKie (D)	Canada	New York Rangers	London Knights (OHL)
212	Erich Goldmann (D)	Germany	Ottawa Senators (from Pittsburgh)^{4}	Adler Mannheim (Germany)
213	Jeff Milleker (C)	Canada	Philadelphia Flyers	Moose Jaw Warriors (WHL)
214	Matthew Scorsune (D)	United States	Colorado Avalanche	Hotchkiss School (USHS–CT)
215	Craig Stahl (RW)	Canada	Detroit Red Wings	Tri-City Americans (WHL)

1. Ottawa's eighth-round pick went to Los Angeles as the result of a trade on March 20, 1996 that sent Kevin Brown to Ottawa in exchange for Jaroslav Modry and this pick.
2. Buffalo's eight-round pick went to St. Louis as the result of a trade on March 20, 1996 that sent Jean-Luc Grand-Pierre, a second-round pick in the 1996 Entry Draft and a third-round pick in the 1997 entry draft to Buffalo in exchange for Yuri Khmylev and this pick.
3. Tampa Bay's eighth-round pick went to New Jersey as the result of a trade on June 22, 1996 that sent Corey Schwab to Tampa Bay in exchange for Jeff Reese, a second-round pick in the 1996 Entry Draft and this pick.
4. Pittsburgh's eighth-round pick went to Ottawa as the result of a trade on March 1, 1996 that sent Dave McLlwain to Pittsburgh in exchange for this pick.

=== Round nine ===
#	Player	Nationality	NHL team	College/junior/club team
216	Ivan Ciernik (LW)	Slovakia	Ottawa Senators	HK Nitra (Slovakia)
217	David Thibeault (LW)	Canada	San Jose Sharks	Drummondville Voltigeurs (QMJHL)
218	Mike Muzechka (D)	Canada	New York Islanders	Calgary Hitmen (WHL)
219	Sebastien Simard (LW)	Canada	Los Angeles Kings	Drummondville Voltigeurs (QMJHL)
220	Nick Bootland (LW)	Canada	Dallas Stars	Guelph Storm (OHL)
221	John Hultberg (G)	United States	Edmonton Oilers	Kingston Frontenacs (OHL)
222	Scott Buhler (G)	Canada	Buffalo Sabres	Medicine Hat Tigers (WHL)
223	Craig Adams (RW)	Canada	Hartford Whalers	Harvard University (ECAC)
224	Tobias Johansson (LW)	Sweden	Mighty Ducks of Anaheim	Malmo IF (Sweden)
225	Pasi Petrilainen (D)	Finland	New Jersey Devils	Tappara (Finland)
226	Marc-Etienne Hubert (C)	Canada	Phoenix Coyotes	Laval Titan Collège Français (QMJHL)
227	Lubomir Vaic (C)	Slovakia	Vancouver Canucks	HC Kosice (Slovakia)
228	Ronald Petrovicky (RW)	Slovakia	Calgary Flames	Prince George Cougars (WHL)
229	Konstantin Shafranov (RW)	Kazakhstan	St. Louis Blues	Fort Wayne Komets (IHL)
230	Jared Hope (C)	Canada	Toronto Maple Leafs	Spokane Chiefs (WHL)
231	Askhat Rakhmatullin (LW)	Russia	Hartford Whalers (from Tampa Bay)^{1}	Salavat Yulayev Ufa (Russia)
232	Chad Cavanagh (LW)	Canada	Washington Capitals	London Knights (OHL)
233	Michel Tremblay (LW)	Canada	Montreal Canadiens	Shawinigan Cataractes (QMJHL)
234	Anders Soderberg (LW)	Sweden	Boston Bruins	MODO (Sweden)
235	Russell Smith (D)	Canada	Florida Panthers	Hull Olympiques (QMJHL)
236	Andrei Kozyrev (D)	Russia	Chicago Blackhawks	Severstal Cherepovets (Russia)
237	Ronnie Sundin (D)	Sweden	New York Rangers	Vastra Frolunda HC (Sweden)
238	Timo Seikkula (C)	Finland	Pittsburgh Penguins	Junkkarit (Finland)
239	Sami Salo (D)	Finland	Ottawa Senators (from Philadelphia)^{2}	TPS (Finland)
240	Justin Clark (RW)	United States	Colorado Avalanche	University of Michigan (CCHA)
241	Yevgeni Afanasyev (LW)	Russia	Detroit Red Wings	Detroit Little Caesars Midgets (MWEHL)

1. Tampa Bay's ninth-round pick went to Hartford as the result of a trade on December 1, 1995 that sent Jeff Reese to Tampa Bay in exchange for this pick.
2. Philadelphia's ninth-round pick went to Ottawa as the result of a trade on March 19, 1996 that sent Kerry Huffman to Philadelphia in exchange for this pick.

== Draftees based on nationality ==
Rank	Country	Number	Percent
	North America	169	70.1%
1	Canada	140	58.1%
2	United States	29	12.0%
	Europe	72	29.9%
3	Russia	21	8.7%
4	Sweden	15	6.2%
5	Czech Republic	11	4.6%
6	Finland	8	3.3%
7	Slovakia	7	2.9%
8	Germany	3	1.2%
8	Ukraine	3	1.2%
10	Belarus	1	0.4%
10	Lithuania	1	0.4%
10	Switzerland	1	0.4%
10	Denmark	1	0.4%
10	Kazakhstan	1	0.4%

== See also ==
- 1996–97 NHL season
- List of NHL players
