= Magnus Nilsson =

Magnus Nilsson may refer to:

- Magnus the Strong (Magnus Nilsson; 1106–1134), Scandinavian ruler
- Magnus Nilsson (ice hockey) (born 1978), Swedish ice hockey player
- Magnus Nilsson (chef) (born 1983), Swedish chef
- Magnus Nilsson (actor) (born 1947), winner of the 1992 Guldbagge Award for Best Screenplay
- Magnus Nilsson (athlete) (1888–1958), Swedish pole vaulter; see Sweden at the 1912 Summer Olympics
