= Ahmaoja =

Ahmaoja is a Finnish language surname, which derives from two nouns, ahma meaning "wolverine", and oja meaning "brook" or "ditch". The surname is rare, being held by fewer than 100 people in Finland. Notable people with the surname include:

- Timo Ahmaoja (born 1978), Finnish ice hockey player
