= Petr Šachl =

Czech professional ice hockey forward (born 1977)

- Born: December 2, 1977 (age 48) Jindřichův Hradec, Czechoslovakia
- Height: 6 ft 2 in (188 cm)
- Weight: 195 lb (88 kg; 13 st 13 lb)
- Position: Forward
- Shot: Left
- Played for: HDD Olimpija Ljubljana
- NHL draft: 128th overall, 1996; New York Islanders
- Playing career: 1997–2013

Petr Šachl (born December 12, 1977) is a Czech former professional ice hockey forward who last played for HDD Olimpija Ljubljana of the Erste Bank Eishockey Liga.

Šachl was picked 128th overall in the 1996 NHL entry draft by New York Islanders from HC České Budějovice. He then spent a year in the Western Hockey League for the Tri-City Americans before returning to České Budějovice. He moved to North America in 1999-00 and played one game in the West Coast Hockey League for the Tacoma Sabercats and then played three games in the United Hockey League for the Asheville Smoke before playing 55 games of the Fort Wayne Komets in the same league. In 2000, he was traded to Nashville Predators, and spent two seasons playing for the Milwaukee Admirals of the American Hockey League. He then moved to Finland in the Sm-liiga for Ässät and then for SaiPa and then briefly played in Sweden's Elitserien for Brynäs IF before returning to the Czech Extraliga with HC Liberec in 2005. On 9 October 2009, it was announced he had signed for HC Košice of the Slovak Extraliga.

On July 30, 2010, Sachl signed with HDD Olimpija Ljubljana of the Erste Bank Eishockey Liga.

== Career statistics ==
			Regular season					Playoffs
Season	Team	League	GP	G	A	Pts	PIM	GP	G	A	Pts	PIM
1995–96	HC Ceske Budejovice	Czech	—	—	—	—	—	2	0	0	0	2
1996–97	HC Ceske Budejovice	Czech	2	0	0	0	0	—	—	—	—	—
1996–97	Tri-City Americans	WHL	63	13	24	37	32	—	—	—	—	—
1997–98	HC Ceske Budejovice	Czech	20	1	1	2	4	—	—	—	—	—
1998–99	HC Ceske Budejovice	Czech	4	0	1	1	2	—	—	—	—	—
1999–00	Fort Wayne Komets	UHL	55	30	24	54	28	10	4	7	11	8
1999–00	Tacoma Sabercats	WCHL	1	0	0	0	0	—	—	—	—	—
1999–00	Asheville Smoke	UHL	3	0	1	1	4	—	—	—	—	—
2000–01	Milwaukee Admirals	IHL	76	12	17	29	33	5	0	0	0	4
2001–02	Milwaukee Admirals	AHL	79	14	29	43	52	—	—	—	—	—
2002–03	Ässät	Liiga	8	3	3	6	18	—	—	—	—	—
2003–04	SaiPa	Liiga	55	15	22	37	66	—	—	—	—	—
2004–05	SaiPa	Liiga	43	12	15	27	28	—	—	—	—	—
2004–05	Brynäs IF	SHL	10	2	1	3	4	10	6	2	8	8
2005–06	Bili Tygri Liberec	Czech	51	15	20	35	64	5	5	0	5	8
2006–07	Bili Tygri Liberec	Czech	50	10	12	22	30	12	1	0	1	10
2007–08	Bili Tygri Liberec	Czech	35	8	2	10	16	11	2	2	4	12
2008–09	Bili Tygri Liberec	Czech	45	9	14	23	65	3	0	0	0	4
2009–10	HC Kosice	Slovak	35	6	11	17	20	8	3	1	4	14
2009–10	KLH Vajgar Jindřichův Hradec	Czech3	4	2	4	6	0	—	—	—	—	—
2010–11	Olimpija Ljubljana	EBEL	53	22	31	53	60	4	1	0	1	2
2010–11	Olimpija Ljubljana	Slovenia	2	2	1	3	2	4	1	2	3	2
2011–12	Olimpija Ljubljana	EBEL	44	8	15	23	36	4	1	0	1	2
2012–13	SG Pontebba	Italy	30	11	15	26	16	4	1	1	2	4
2012–13	KLH Vajgar Jindřichův Hradec	Czech3	4	3	1	4	2	—	—	—	—	—
2013–14	HC Ceske Budejovice	Czech2	51	10	15	25	48	8	0	2	2	4
2014–15	HC Slavoj Zirovnice	Czech4	18	14	22	36	66	—	—	—	—	—
AHL totals			79	14	29	43	52	—	—	—	—	—
Czech totals			207	43	50	93	181	33	8	2	10	36
