= Sergei Zimakov =

Russian ice hockey player

- Born: January 15, 1978 (age 48) Moscow, USSR
- Height: 6 ft 1 in (185 cm)
- Weight: 203 lb (92 kg; 14 st 7 lb)
- Position: Defence
- Shot: Left
- NHL draft: 58th overall, 1996; Washington Capitals
- Playing career: 2002–2007

Sergei Zimakov (born January 15, 1978) is a Russian former professional ice hockey player. He was selected by Washington Capitals in the 3rd round (58th overall) of the 1996 NHL entry draft.
