= Nolan McDonald =

Canadian ice hockey player

- Born: July 29, 1977 (age 48) Thunder Bay, Ontario, Canada
- Height: 6 ft 2 in (188 cm)
- Weight: 185 lb (84 kg; 13 st 3 lb)
- Position: Goaltender
- Caught: Left
- Played for: ECHL; Raleigh Icecaps; South Carolina Stingrays; Pee Dee Pride; Columbus Cottonmouths; WPHL; Fort Worth Brahmas; Lake Charles Ice Pirates; Victoria Salmon Kings; UHL; Kalamazoo Wings; DEL; Kassel Huskies
- NHL draft: 147th overall, 1996; Vancouver Canucks
- Playing career: 1997–2009

Nolan McDonald (born July 29, 1977) is a Canadian former professional ice hockey goaltender. He was selected by the Vancouver Canucks in the 6th round (147th overall) of the 1996 NHL entry draft.

McDonald spent the majority of his professional career playing in the German 2nd Bundesliga where, in 2003, he was selected as the Goaltender of the Year. Nolan is credited as being the first goaltender in the history of the German Bundesliga to be named his team's captain.

McDonald now owns a film studio in New Brunswick, Canada. He has a credit as an executive producer of the film Decoding Annie Parker, which starred Helen Hunt, Samantha Morton and Aaron Paul.
