= Per-Anton Lundström =

Swedish ice hockey player

Personal information
- Born: September 29, 1977 (age 48)

Sport
- Country: Sweden
- Sport: ice hockey

Per-Anton Lundstrom (born September 29, 1977) is a Swedish former professional ice hockey defenceman.

Lundstrom had an extensive career playing in the Swedish Hockey League.

Lundstrom was indirectly part of the trade of Teemu Selanne from the Winnipeg Jets to the Anaheim Ducks. Lundstrom was the 62nd pick of the 1996 NHL entry draft by the Winnipeg Jets with a pick that was traded from Anaheim to Winnipeg for Selanne (with other assets changing teams as well).
