= Darren Van Oene =

Canadian ice hockey player

- Born: January 18, 1978 (age 48) Edmonton, Alberta, Canada
- Height: 6 ft 4 in (193 cm)
- Weight: 225 lb (102 kg; 16 st 1 lb)
- Position: Left wing
- Shot: Left
- Played for: Rochester Americans; Providence Bruins; Manchester Monarchs; Worcester IceCats
- NHL draft: 33rd overall, 1996; Buffalo Sabres
- Playing career: 1998–2005

Darren Van Oene (born January 18, 1978) is a Canadian former professional ice hockey winger. Picked 33rd overall from the Western Hockey League's Brandon Wheat Kings by the Buffalo Sabres in the second round of the 1996 NHL entry draft, he never played in the National Hockey League, spending his entire career in the minor leagues.

Van Oene debuted with Buffalo's American Hockey League affiliate, the Rochester Americans, in the 1998–1999 season. He played with the Americans for four seasons before the Boston Bruins signed him as a free agent on July 29, 2002, and assigned him to their AHL team, the Providence Bruins. After playing two seasons and part of a third with Providence, Van Oene finished the 2004–05 season by moving between the AHL's Manchester Monarchs and Worcester IceCats, and also spent time in the United Hockey League with the Elmira Jackals.

== Career statistics ==
			Regular season					Playoffs
Season	Team	League	GP	G	A	Pts	PIM	GP	G	A	Pts	PIM
1993–94	Brandon Wheat Kings	WHL	2	0	0	0	7	—	—	—	—	—
1994–95	Brandon Wheat Kings	WHL	59	5	13	18	108	18	1	1	2	34
1995–96	Brandon Wheat Kings	WHL	47	10	18	28	126	18	1	6	7	78
1996–97	Brandon Wheat Kings	WHL	56	21	27	48	139	6	2	3	5	19
1997–98	Brandon Wheat Kings	WHL	51	23	24	47	161	18	6	8	14	51
1998–99	Rochester Americans	AHL	73	11	20	31	143	12	2	4	6	8
1999–00	Rochester Americans	AHL	80	20	18	38	153	21	1	3	4	24
2000–01	Rochester Americans	AHL	64	10	12	22	147	4	1	0	1	4
2001–02	Rochester Americans	AHL	52	8	6	14	73	2	0	0	0	4
2002–03	Providence Bruins	AHL	78	11	17	28	109	4	0	0	0	21
2003–04	Providence Bruins	AHL	72	9	16	25	111	2	0	0	0	0
2004–05	Elmira Jackals	UHL	44	9	15	24	38	—	—	—	—	—
2004–05	Providence Bruins	AHL	4	0	0	0	7	—	—	—	—	—
2004–05	Manchester Monarchs	AHL	4	0	0	0	10	—	—	—	—	—
2004–05	Worcester IceCats	AHL	14	0	0	0	6	—	—	—	—	—
AHL totals			441	69	89	158	759	45	4	7	11	61
