= Brandon Sugden =

Canadian ice hockey player (born 1978)

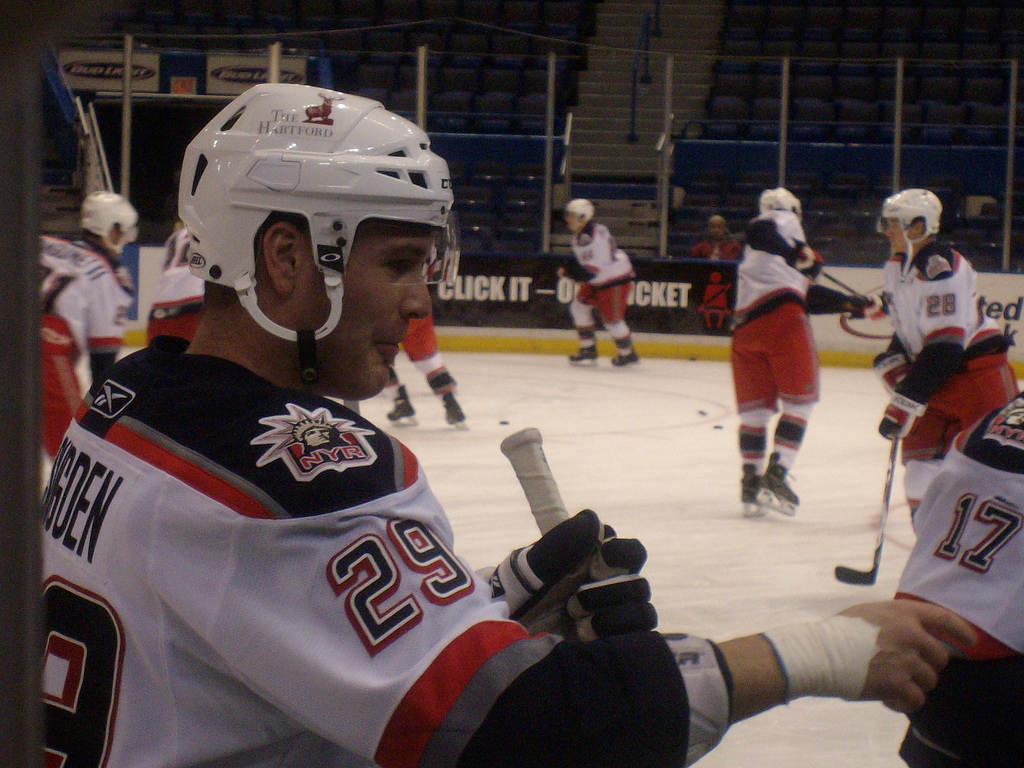
- Sugden with the Hartford Wolf Pack in 2008
- Born: June 23, 1978 (age 47) Toronto, Ontario, Canada
- Height: 6 ft 4 in (193 cm)
- Weight: 245 lb (111 kg; 17 st 7 lb)
- Position: Right wing
- Shot: Right
- Played for: Dayton Bombers; Cincinnati Cyclones; Tallahassee Tiger Sharks; Peoria Rivermen; Worcester IceCats; Verdun Dragons; Syracuse Crunch; Saint-Jean Chiefs; Hartford Wolf Pack; Hershey Bears; Vityaz Chekhov; Tulsa Oilers
- NHL draft: 111th overall, 1996; Toronto Maple Leafs
- Playing career: 1998–2011

Brandon Sugden (born June 23, 1978) is a Canadian former professional ice hockey right winger. He was selected by Toronto Maple Leafs in the fifth round (111th overall) of the 1996 NHL entry draft. Nicknamed "Sugar" during his rookie training camp in Toronto, Sugden played 406 career games from 1998 until 2011.

Sugden retired in 2010 due to post-concussion syndrome.

== Personal life ==
Since his retirement, Sugden runs a high-profile garment embroidery business in his hometown of Toronto.
