= Marián Cisár =

Slovak ice hockey player (born 1978)

- Born: February 25, 1978 (age 48) Bratislava, Czechoslovakia
- Height: 6 ft 0 in (183 cm)
- Weight: 197 lb (89 kg; 14 st 1 lb)
- Position: Right wing
- Shot: Right
- Played for: HC Slovan Bratislava; Nashville Predators; HC Znojemsti Orli; Nürnberg Ice Tigers; Hannover Scorpions
- National team: Slovakia
- NHL draft: 37th overall, 1996; Los Angeles Kings
- Playing career: 1998–2005

Marián Cisár (born February 25, 1978) is a Slovak former professional ice hockey player. He last played for the Hannover Scorpions of the Deutsche Eishockey Liga. He previously played for the Nashville Predators of the National Hockey League (NHL) and Milwaukee Admirals of the American Hockey League (AHL).

== Playing career ==
As a youth, Cisár played in the 1992 Quebec International Pee-Wee Hockey Tournament with a team from Bratislava.

Cisár played junior hockey for the Spokane Chiefs in the Western Hockey League. He was drafted 37th overall by the Los Angeles Kings of the National Hockey League in the 1996 NHL entry draft, but was traded to the Nashville Predators for future considerations without ever having played for the Kings. He was the first player acquired in Predators franchise history, and played in 73 regular season games for Nashville between 1999 and 2002, recording 30 points (13 goals and 17 assists). In 2004, he suffered a concussion playing for the Hannover Scorpions in Germany which ended his season after just 14 games.

He represented the Slovakia national team, and played in 15 games.

== Career statistics ==
			Regular season					Playoffs
Season	Team	League	GP	G	A	Pts	PIM	GP	G	A	Pts	PIM
1995–96	HC Slovan Bratislava	Slovak	13	3	3	6	0	6	3	0	3	0
1996–97	Spokane Chiefs	WHL	70	31	35	66	52	9	6	2	8	4
1997–98	Spokane Chiefs	WHL	52	33	40	73	34	18	8	5	13	8
1998–99	Milwaukee Admirals	IHL	51	11	17	28	31	2	0	0	0	12
1999–00	Nashville Predators	NHL	3	0	0	0	4	—	—	—	—	—
1999–00	Milwaukee Admirals	IHL	78	20	32	52	82	1	0	0	0	0
2000–01	Nashville Predators	NHL	60	12	15	27	45	—	—	—	—	—
2000–01	Milwaukee Admirals	IHL	15	4	7	11	4	—	—	—	—	—
2001–02	Nashville Predators	NHL	10	1	2	3	8	—	—	—	—	—
2001–02	Milwaukee Admirals	AHL	2	1	0	1	2	—	—	—	—	—
2002–03	HC Znojemsti Orli	Czech	9	2	0	2	4	—	—	—	—	—
2002–03	Lukko	Liiga	26	6	8	14	6	—	—	—	—	—
2003–04	Nürnberg Ice Tigers	DEL	43	23	13	36	26	2	0	0	0	2
2004–05	Hannover Scorpions	DEL	14	4	6	10	8	—	—	—	—	—
NHL totals			73	13	17	30	57	—	—	—	—	—
IHL totals			144	35	56	91	117	3	0	0	0	12
