= Timo Ahmaoja =

Finnish ice hockey player (born 1978)

- Born: August 8, 1978 (age 47) Jyväskylä, Finland
- Height: 6 ft 1 in (185 cm)
- Weight: 183 lb (83 kg; 13 st 1 lb)
- Position: Defence
- Shot: Right
- Played for: JYP; Lukko; KalPa; HIFK; SaiPa; Pelicans; HPK; Ässät
- NHL draft: 172nd overall, 1996; Mighty Ducks of Anaheim
- Playing career: 1996–2006

Timo Ahmaoja (born August 8, 1978) is a Finnish former professional ice hockey player. He played in the SM-liiga for JYP, Lukko, KalPa, HIFK, SaiPa, Pelicans, HPK and Ässät. He was drafted 172nd overall by the Mighty Ducks of Anaheim in the 1996 NHL entry draft.
