= Jason York =

Canadian ice hockey player (born 1970)

- Born: May 20, 1970 (age 56) Nepean, Ontario, Canada
- Height: 6 ft 1 in (185 cm)
- Weight: 208 lb (94 kg; 14 st 12 lb)
- Position: Defence
- Shot: Right
- Played for: Detroit Red Wings; Mighty Ducks of Anaheim; Ottawa Senators; Nashville Predators; HC Lugano; Boston Bruins
- National team: Canada
- NHL draft: 129th overall, 1990; Detroit Red Wings
- Playing career: 1991–2007

Jason Andrew York (born May 20, 1970) is a Canadian former professional ice hockey defenseman who played for the Detroit Red Wings, Mighty Ducks of Anaheim, Ottawa Senators, Nashville Predators and the Boston Bruins of the National Hockey League (NHL). He was previously a hockey analyst on Montreal Canadiens' broadcasts on Sportsnet.

== Playing career ==
York was selected in the seventh round (129th overall) of the 1990 NHL entry draft by the Detroit Red Wings. His first NHL game was played during the 1992–93 NHL season when he suited up for the Red Wings December 3, 1992, against the Minnesota North Stars. He scored his first NHL goal on April 10, 1994, against fellow Nepean native Fred Brathwaite of the Edmonton Oilers.

Despite excelling in the minors, York found it difficult to crack a deep Detroit line-up and, after playing only nineteen games over three seasons for the Red Wings, he was traded to the Mighty Ducks of Anaheim April 5, 1995, along with Mike Sillinger in exchange for Stu Grimson, Mark Ferner, and a draft pick. In Anaheim, York was able to establish himself as an NHL regular and turned in a solid season in 1995–96, posting 3 goals and 21 assists for 24 points in 79 games. York was traded to the Ottawa Senators on October 1, 1996, with Shaun Van Allen in exchange for Ted Drury and the rights to Marc Moro. Then-Ottawa general manager (GM) Pierre Gauthier had gained familiarity with York in his previous job as Anaheim's assistant GM.

Playing in his hometown of Ottawa, York established himself as a steady two-way defenseman on an up-and-coming Senators team. In 1998–99, he recorded 35 points to lead all Senators' defensemen in scoring. He spent five steady seasons in Ottawa where the club made the playoffs each year York was there before becoming an unrestricted free agent in 2001.

York returned to Anaheim as a free agent for the 2001–02 campaign, signing a three-year, $6 million contract. He turned in another solid year but was traded at the start of the 2002–03 season to the Nashville Predators. York led the Predators with the top plus minus in his first year with the club and helped Nashville make the playoffs for the first time in franchise history the following year.

Many figured that the 2004–05 NHL lock-out would end his NHL career, as it did for many veteran players; after not playing in 2004–2005 due to 3 major surgeries and the passing of his father, York signed with HC Lugano for the 2005–06 season, where he would win the Swiss League championship. He performed well enough to earn another chance in the NHL, signing with the Boston Bruins for the 2006–07 season and appearing in 49 games with Boston. York suffered 3 knee injuries that season which ended his career. He scored one goal for Boston, on February 20, 2007, in the Bruins' 3-0 win at Toronto. It was his final NHL goal.

In 757 NHL games over 13 seasons, York recorded 42 goals and 187 assists for 229 points, along with 621 penalty minutes. He added 2 goals and 9 points in 34 playoff games, getting as far as the second round once (in 1998, when the Senators were eliminated by the eventual Stanley Cup finalist Washington Capitals).

== Post-retirement ==
York started his broadcasting career in 2008 on Ottawa's all-sports radio station, TSN 1200 after completing the NHLPA life after hockey broadcasting program at Quinnipiac University. From 2008 to 2013 York co-hosted the daily afternoon-drive show The Healthy Scratches and later went on to co-host the mid-morning show, In The Box, both with Steve Lloyd. York also dabbled in writing as well with the Ottawa Sun where he wrote his weekly column, the York State of Mind during his time on Ottawa Sports radio. In 2011, York also began appearing on Sportsnet television broadcasts for Ottawa Senators games, adding commentary with co-host Ian Mendes, and later with Shawn McKenzie. With the move of the Senators to TSN in 2014 York took on a new larger role with Sportsnet as the television colour analyst for the Montreal Canadiens with John Bartlett. York also has begun working on Hockey Night in Canada as a colour analyst.

On July 19, 2017, York as part of an ownership group, purchased the Kemptville 73's of the Central Canada Hockey League, from former NHL goaltender Ron Tugnutt. York was also installed as the team's director of hockey operations.

== Career statistics ==
			Regular season					Playoffs
Season	Team	League	GP	G	A	Pts	PIM	GP	G	A	Pts	PIM
1986–87	Smiths Falls Bears	CJHL	46	6	13	19	86	—	—	—	—	—
1987–88	Hamilton Steelhawks	OHL	58	4	9	13	110	8	0	0	0	8
1988–89	Windsor Compuware Spitfires	OHL	65	19	44	63	105	4	2	1	3	8
1989–90	Windsor Spitfires	OHL	39	9	30	39	38	—	—	—	—	—
1989–90	Kitchener Rangers	OHL	25	11	25	36	17	17	3	19	22	10
1990–91	Windsor Spitfires	OHL	66	13	80	93	40	11	3	10	13	12
1991–92	Adirondack Red Wings	AHL	49	4	20	24	32	5	0	1	1	0
1992–93	Adirondack Red Wings	AHL	77	15	40	55	86	11	0	3	3	18
1992–93	Detroit Red Wings	NHL	2	0	0	0	0	—	—	—	—	—
1993–94	Adirondack Red Wings	AHL	74	10	56	66	98	12	3	11	14	22
1993–94	Detroit Red Wings	NHL	7	1	2	3	2	—	—	—	—	—
1994–95	Adirondack Red Wings	AHL	5	1	3	4	4	—	—	—	—	—
1994–95	Detroit Red Wings	NHL	10	1	2	3	2	—	—	—	—	—
1994–95	Mighty Ducks of Anaheim	NHL	15	0	8	8	12	—	—	—	—	—
1995–96	Mighty Ducks of Anaheim	NHL	79	3	21	24	88	—	—	—	—	—
1996–97	Ottawa Senators	NHL	75	4	17	21	67	7	0	0	0	4
1997–98	Ottawa Senators	NHL	73	3	13	16	62	7	1	1	2	7
1998–99	Ottawa Senators	NHL	79	4	31	35	48	4	1	1	2	4
1999–00	Ottawa Senators	NHL	79	8	22	30	60	6	0	2	2	2
2000–01	Ottawa Senators	NHL	74	6	16	22	72	4	0	0	0	4
2001–02	Mighty Ducks of Anaheim	NHL	74	5	20	25	60	—	—	—	—	—
2002–03	Cincinnati Mighty Ducks	AHL	4	3	2	5	8	—	—	—	—	—
2002–03	Nashville Predators	NHL	74	4	15	19	52	—	—	—	—	—
2003–04	Nashville Predators	NHL	67	2	13	15	64	6	0	3	3	4
2005–06	HC Lugano	NLA	34	3	17	20	122	16	1	3	4	8
2006–07	Boston Bruins	NHL	49	1	7	8	32	—	—	—	—	—
NHL totals			757	42	187	229	621	34	2	7	9	25

== Awards and honours ==
Award	Year
AHL
Calder Cup (Adirondack Red Wings)	1992
First All-Star Team	1994
NL
Champion (HC Lugano)	2006
Spengler Cup All-Star Team	2006
