= Brian Willsie =

Canadian ice hockey player (born 1978)

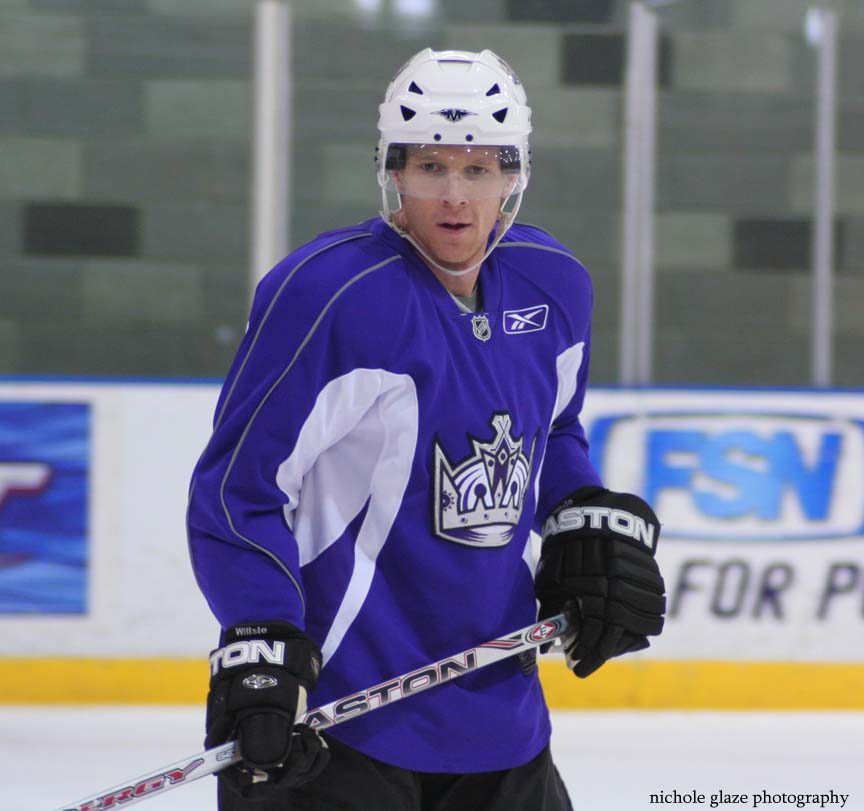
- Born: March 16, 1978 (age 48) London, Ontario, Canada
- Height: 6 ft 1 in (185 cm)
- Weight: 202 lb (92 kg; 14 st 6 lb)
- Position: Right wing
- Shot: Right
- Played for: Colorado Avalanche; Washington Capitals; Los Angeles Kings; TPS; Kloten Flyers; KHL Medveščak Zagreb; Örebro HK
- NHL draft: 146th overall, 1996; Colorado Avalanche
- Playing career: 1998–2015

Brian R. Willsie (born March 16, 1978) is a Canadian former professional ice hockey right winger. Willsie was selected by the Colorado Avalanche in the 6th round (146th overall) of the 1996 NHL entry draft and played almost 400 games in the National Hockey League with the Avalanche, Washington Capitals and Los Angeles Kings. Willsie currently works in a player development role within the Avalanche organization.

== Personal life ==
Willsie's uncle was an international ice hockey referee and his cousin David Willsie is a Paralympic athlete.

== Playing career ==
Willsie grew up in the small southwestern Ontario town of Belmont, Ontario and played minor hockey for the local Belmont MHA teams and eventually one year with the AAA Elgin-Middlesex Chiefs. In 1993–94 he played for the Chiefs Midget AAA team before signing for the 1994–95 season with the St. Thomas Stars Jr.B. club of the Western Ontario Junior B League (OHA). With the Stars Brian teamed up with St Thomas native Joe Thornton to help capture the Western Jr. B. League championship.

Willsie began his junior career with the Guelph Storm of the OHL in the 1995–96 season. At the conclusion of the season, Brian was drafted 146th overall by the Colorado Avalanche in the 1996 NHL entry draft. After starring for the Storm in the following two seasons, Brian was named to the OHL First All-Star team and represented Canada at the 1998 World Junior Championships.

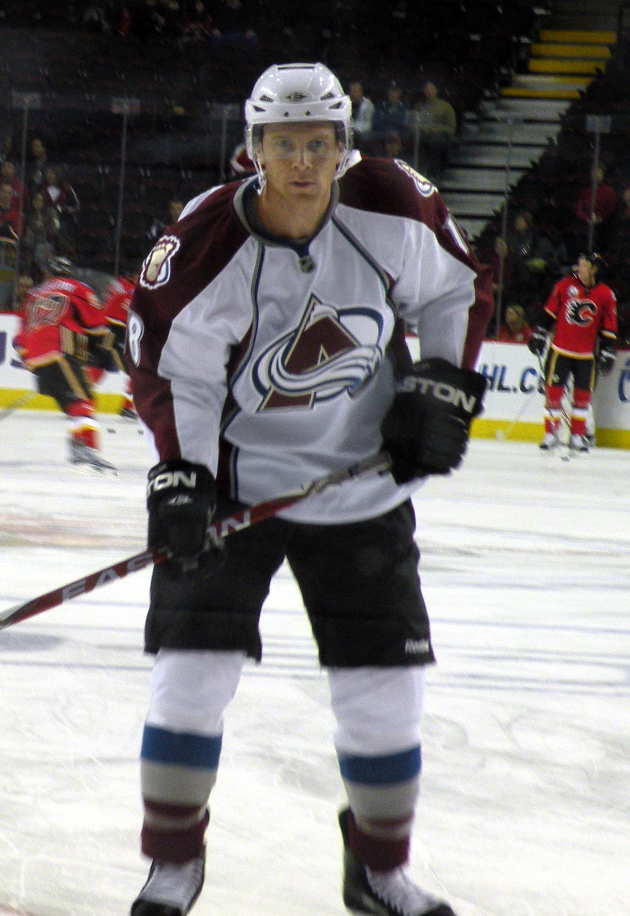
Willsie during his second tenure with the Avalanche in 2009.

Willsie made his professional debut in the 1998–99 season with the Hershey Bears of the AHL, affiliate of the Avalanche. In the 1999–2000 season, Brian made his NHL debut with the Colorado Avalanche, playing in a solitary game on January 9, 2000, against the Chicago Blackhawks. It wasn't until the 2001–02 season that Willsie played his first full season in the NHL appearing in 56 games with the Avalanche.

After spending the majority of his 5-year tenure with Colorado splitting between the AHL and the NHL, Willsie was claimed by the Washington Capitals prior to the 2003–04 season on October 3, 2003. Willsie established himself with the Capitals scoring 15 points in 49 games in a season that was shortened with a concussion

During the 2004–05 NHL lockout, Willsie had a brief stay with Slovenian team HDD Olimpija Ljubljana before he racked up a team-leading 24 goals along with 17 assists (41 points) in just 53 games played for Capitals affiliate, the Portland Pirates, in the AHL. The 2005–06 season was a breakout year for Willsie, as he set career highs with 19 goals, 22 assists, for a total of 41 points with the Capitals.

On July 4, 2006, Brian signed a two-year contract with the Los Angeles Kings. After missing only 1 games with the Kings in the 2006–07 season, Willsie suffered a downturn in production and was often an extra forward in the following season, appearing in only 53 contests.

On July 15, 2008, Willsie signed a one-year deal with the Colorado Avalanche, marking his second stint with the team. Brian now a veteran, was reassigned to captain affiliate the Lake Erie Monsters prior to the 2008–09 season. Only 14 games into the season, Willsie was recalled to the depleted Avalanche where he remained for the season appearing in 42 games and scoring his lone goal for the season on January 21, 2009, against former team the Kings in a 6-5 loss. Willsie re-signed a one-year deal with the Avalanche on July 6, 2009.

Willsie played in four games with the Avalanche early in the 2009–10 season but primarily remained in the AHL to continue as captain of Lake Erie. He set a franchise record and led the team with 26 goals in 75 games.

On July 14, 2010, Willsie signed a one-year two-way contract with the Washington Capitals. Brian was assigned to the Hershey Bears where he spent the entire 2010-2011 season with the exception of a one-game recall to the Washington Capitals. With the Bears, Willsie had a career year and led the team in goals with 30.

On July 7, 2011, Willsie signed a one-year contract with the Montreal Canadiens. Assigned to affiliate, the Hamilton Bulldogs, Willsie was named an alternate captain and concluded the 2011-12 season leading the team in scoring with 44 points in 68 games.

After spending the last four seasons primarily in the AHL, Willsie returned for his second tenure in Europe signing an initial try-out contract with Finnish team, TPS of the SM-liiga, on August 21, 2012. During the 2012–13 season on September 22, 2012, TPS extended his contract for the remainder of the season and named him captain. In leading TPS with 24 goals, good for third in the SM-liiga, Willsie was subsequently signed to a one-year contract extension on February 14, 2013. With his intentions to experience various styles of European hockey from the onset, Willsie was then immediately granted permission by TPS to join Kloten Flyers of the Swiss National League A for the remainder of the season with his extension for the 2014 season with TPS still in effect.

On July 9, 2013, Willsie signed a unique dual contract with Croatian club, KHL Medveščak Zagreb, of the Kontinental Hockey League for the beginning of the 2013–14 KHL season. Under the terms of the contract, Willsie agreed to play with Zagreb from August to October, then honour his Finnish contract with TPS. Willsie was signed with a view to commit to Medveščak Zagreb for the following 2014–15 season. After contributing with 5 points in 13 games, Willsie returned to TPS and compiled 25 points in 33 Liiga games before opting to join a third club prior to the transfer deadline, agreeing to a two-year deal with Örebro HK in the Swedish Hockey League on February 17, 2014.

At the conclusion of the 2014–15 season in Sweden, Willsie opted to end his professional career and returned to work in the Colorado Avalanche organization in a consultancy player development role.

== Career statistics ==
=== Regular season and playoffs ===
			Regular season					Playoffs
Season	Team	League	GP	G	A	Pts	PIM	GP	G	A	Pts	PIM
1993–94	Elgin-Middlesex Chiefs	OMHA	39	29	40	69	32	—	—	—	—	—
1994–95	St. Thomas Stars Jr.B.	WOJHL	45	35	47	82	47	—	—	—	—	—
1995–96	Guelph Storm	OHL	65	13	21	34	18	16	4	2	6	6
1996–97	Guelph Storm	OHL	64	37	31	68	37	18	15	4	19	10
1997–98	Guelph Storm	OHL	57	45	31	76	41	12	9	5	14	18
1998–99	Hershey Bears	AHL	72	19	10	29	28	3	1	0	1	0
1999–00	Hershey Bears	AHL	78	20	39	59	44	12	2	6	8	8
1999–00	Colorado Avalanche	NHL	1	0	0	0	0	—	—	—	—	—
2000–01	Hershey Bears	AHL	48	18	23	41	20	12	7	2	9	14
2001–02	Colorado Avalanche	NHL	56	7	7	14	14	4	0	1	1	2
2002–03	Hershey Bears	AHL	59	29	28	57	49	—	—	—	—	—
2002–03	Colorado Avalanche	NHL	12	0	1	1	15	6	1	0	1	2
2003–04	Washington Capitals	NHL	49	10	5	15	18	—	—	—	—	—
2004–05	HDD Olimpija Ljubljana	SLV	14	7	9	16	38	—	—	—	—	—
2004–05	Portland Pirates	AHL	53	24	17	41	47	—	—	—	—	—
2005–06	Washington Capitals	NHL	82	19	22	41	77	—	—	—	—	—
2006–07	Los Angeles Kings	NHL	81	11	10	21	49	—	—	—	—	—
2007–08	Los Angeles Kings	NHL	53	4	8	12	30	—	—	—	—	—
2008–09	Lake Erie Monsters	AHL	12	8	6	14	8	—	—	—	—	—
2008–09	Colorado Avalanche	NHL	42	1	3	4	14	—	—	—	—	—
2009–10	Lake Erie Monsters	AHL	75	26	31	57	44	—	—	—	—	—
2009–10	Colorado Avalanche	NHL	4	0	0	0	0	—	—	—	—	—
2010–11	Hershey Bears	AHL	76	30	38	68	68	6	2	3	5	6
2010–11	Washington Capitals	NHL	1	0	1	1	0	—	—	—	—	—
2011–12	Hamilton Bulldogs	AHL	68	18	26	44	88	—	—	—	—	—
2012–13	TPS	SM-l	48	24	11	35	105	—	—	—	—	—
2012–13	Kloten Flyers	NLA	6	1	5	6	0	—	—	—	—	—
2013–14	KHL Medveščak Zagreb	KHL	13	2	3	5	10	—	—	—	—	—
2013–14	TPS	Liiga	33	11	14	25	88	—	—	—	—	—
2013–14	Örebro HK	SHL	6	1	0	1	6	—	—	—	—	—
2014–15	Örebro HK	SHL	55	9	12	21	16	6	1	0	1	4
NHL totals			381	52	57	109	217	10	1	1	2	4

=== International ===
Year	Team	Event	Result	GP	G	A	Pts	PIM
1998	Canada	WJC	8th	7	0	2	2	4
Junior totals				7	0	2	2	4

== Awards and honours ==
Award	Year
OHL
First All-Star Team	1998
