= Magnus Nilsson (ice hockey) =

Swedish ice hockey player (born 1978)

- Born: February 1, 1978 (age 48) Finspång, Sweden
- Height: 6 ft 2 in (188 cm)
- Weight: 218 lb (99 kg; 15 st 8 lb)
- Position: Wing
- Shot: Left
- Played for: Malmö Redhawks; Luleå HF; Timrå IK
- NHL draft: 144th overall, 1996; Detroit Red Wings
- Playing career: 1997–2016

Magnus Nilsson (born February 1, 1978) is a Swedish former professional ice hockey forward.

== Playing career ==
Magnus Nilsson was selected on June 22, 1996, by the Detroit Red Wings as their fifth draft choice (144th overall). He was picked in the sixth round of the nine-round 1996 NHL entry draft. He played two seasons for Detroit's ECHL affiliates before returning to Sweden.

Among the teams he represented are Finspångs AIK, Vita Hästen, Luleå, Malmö, Timrå and Hudiksvall. He ended his career in 2016 and became coach of the Söderhamn/Ljusne HC.

== Career statistics ==
			Regular season					Playoffs
Season	Team	League	GP	G	A	Pts	PIM	GP	G	A	Pts	PIM
1995–96	IK Vita Hästen	Division 1	28	3	3	6	16	—	—	—	—	—
1996–97	MIF Redhawks J20	SuperElit	27	13	11	24	—	—	—	—	—	—
1996–97	MIF Redhawks	SHL	12	0	0	0	0	—	—	—	—	—
1997–98	MIF Redhawks	SHL	45	6	1	7	8	—	—	—	—	—
1998–99	MIF Redhawks	SHL	42	0	0	0	10	4	0	0	0	0
1999–00	MIF Redhawks J20	SuperElit	2	0	0	0	6	—	—	—	—	—
1999–00	MIF Redhawks	SHL	44	5	5	10	63	6	0	0	0	25
2000–01	Louisiana IceGators	ECHL	68	13	11	24	66	11	3	2	5	8
2001–02	Toledo Storm	ECHL	57	15	20	35	63	—	—	—	—	—
2002–03	Luleå HF	SHL	47	9	5	14	72	4	0	2	2	2
2003–04	Luleå HF	SHL	49	10	9	19	60	3	0	0	0	27
2004–05	Timrå IK	SHL	46	8	7	15	50	7	1	3	4	8
2005–06	Timrå IK	SHL	44	6	8	14	52	—	—	—	—	—
2006–07	Timrå IK	SHL	40	3	8	11	40	7	1	0	1	6
2007–08	Malmö Redhawks	Allsvenskan	18	0	5	5	45	—	—	—	—	—
2007–08	EfB Ishockey	Denmark	19	7	7	14	26	—	—	—	—	—
2008–09	EfB Ishockey	Denmark	33	13	10	23	40	4	2	2	4	8
2009–10	EfB Ishockey	Denmark	11	2	1	3	12	1	0	0	0	0
2010–11	Hudiksvalls HC	Division 1	32	27	26	53	58	5	1	1	2	25
2011–12	Hudiksvalls HC	Division 1	35	24	22	46	61	3	1	2	3	2
2012–13	Hudiksvalls HC	Division 1	34	25	11	36	32	—	—	—	—	—
2013–14	Hudiksvalls HC	Division 1	35	20	14	34	90	5	2	4	6	4
2014–15	Hudiksvalls HC	Division 1	27	11	6	17	12	—	—	—	—	—
2015–16	Hudiksvalls HC	Division 1	10	6	2	8	6	—	—	—	—	—
ECHL totals			125	28	31	59	129	11	3	2	5	8
SHL totals			369	47	43	90	355	31	2	5	7	68
