= Glen Featherstone =

Canadian ice hockey player (born 1968)

- Born: July 8, 1968 (age 57) Toronto, Ontario, Canada
- Height: 6 ft 4 in (193 cm)
- Weight: 215 lb (98 kg; 15 st 5 lb)
- Position: Defence
- Shot: Left
- Played for: St. Louis Blues; Boston Bruins; New York Rangers; Hartford Whalers; Calgary Flames
- NHL draft: 73rd overall, 1986; St. Louis Blues
- Playing career: 1988–2001

Glen Featherstone (born July 8, 1968) is a Canadian former professional ice hockey defenceman.

== Biography ==
As a youth, Featherstone played in the 1981 Quebec International Pee-Wee Hockey Tournament with the Toronto Young Nationals minor ice hockey team.

Featherstone was drafted 73rd overall by the St. Louis Blues in the 1986 NHL entry draft and made his NHL debut playing for the Blues in 1988. He also played for the Boston Bruins, New York Rangers, Hartford Whalers and the Calgary Flames. In total, Featherstone played 384 regular season games, scoring 19 goals and 61 assists for 80 points and collecting 939 penalty minutes.

He left the NHL after the 1997 season to play in the International Hockey League, playing for the Indianapolis Ice and the Chicago Wolves. After the league folded in 2001, Featherstone retired.

== Career statistics ==
=== Regular season and playoffs ===
			Regular season					Playoffs
Season	Team	League	GP	G	A	Pts	PIM	GP	G	A	Pts	PIM
1984–85	North York Red Wings	OJHL	2	0	0	0	4	—	—	—	—	—
1985–86	Windsor Compuware Spitfires	OHL	49	0	6	6	135	14	1	1	2	23
1986–87	Windsor Compuware Spitfires	OHL	47	6	11	17	154	14	2	6	8	19
1987–88	Windsor Compuware Spitfires	OHL	53	7	27	34	201	12	6	9	15	47
1988–89	St. Louis Blues	NHL	18	0	2	2	22	6	0	0	0	25
1988–89	Peoria Rivermen	IHL	37	5	19	24	97	—	—	—	—	—
1989–90	St. Louis Blues	NHL	58	0	12	12	145	12	0	2	2	47
1989–90	Peoria Rivermen	IHL	15	1	4	5	43	—	—	—	—	—
1990–91	St. Louis Blues	NHL	68	5	15	20	204	9	0	0	0	31
1991–92	Boston Bruins	NHL	7	1	0	1	20	—	—	—	—	—
1992–93	Boston Bruins	NHL	34	5	5	10	102	—	—	—	—	—
1992–93	Providence Bruins	AHL	8	3	4	7	60	—	—	—	—	—
1993–94	Boston Bruins	NHL	58	1	8	9	152	1	0	0	0	0
1994–95	New York Rangers	NHL	6	1	0	1	18	—	—	—	—	—
1994–95	Hartford Whalers	NHL	13	1	1	2	32	—	—	—	—	—
1995–96	Hartford Whalers	NHL	68	2	10	12	138	—	—	—	—	—
1996–97	Hartford Whalers	NHL	41	2	5	7	87	—	—	—	—	—
1996–97	Calgary Flames	NHL	13	1	3	4	19	—	—	—	—	—
1997–98	Indianapolis Ice	IHL	73	10	28	38	187	5	0	3	3	16
1998–99	Chicago Wolves	IHL	62	5	21	26	191	10	0	3	3	26
1999–00	Chicago Wolves	IHL	62	7	12	19	109	16	3	5	8	38
2000–01	Chicago Wolves	IHL	71	6	16	22	152	13	0	2	2	37
NHL totals			384	19	61	80	939	28	0	2	2	103
