= Michael Stewart (ice hockey) =

Canadian-Austrian ice hockey player

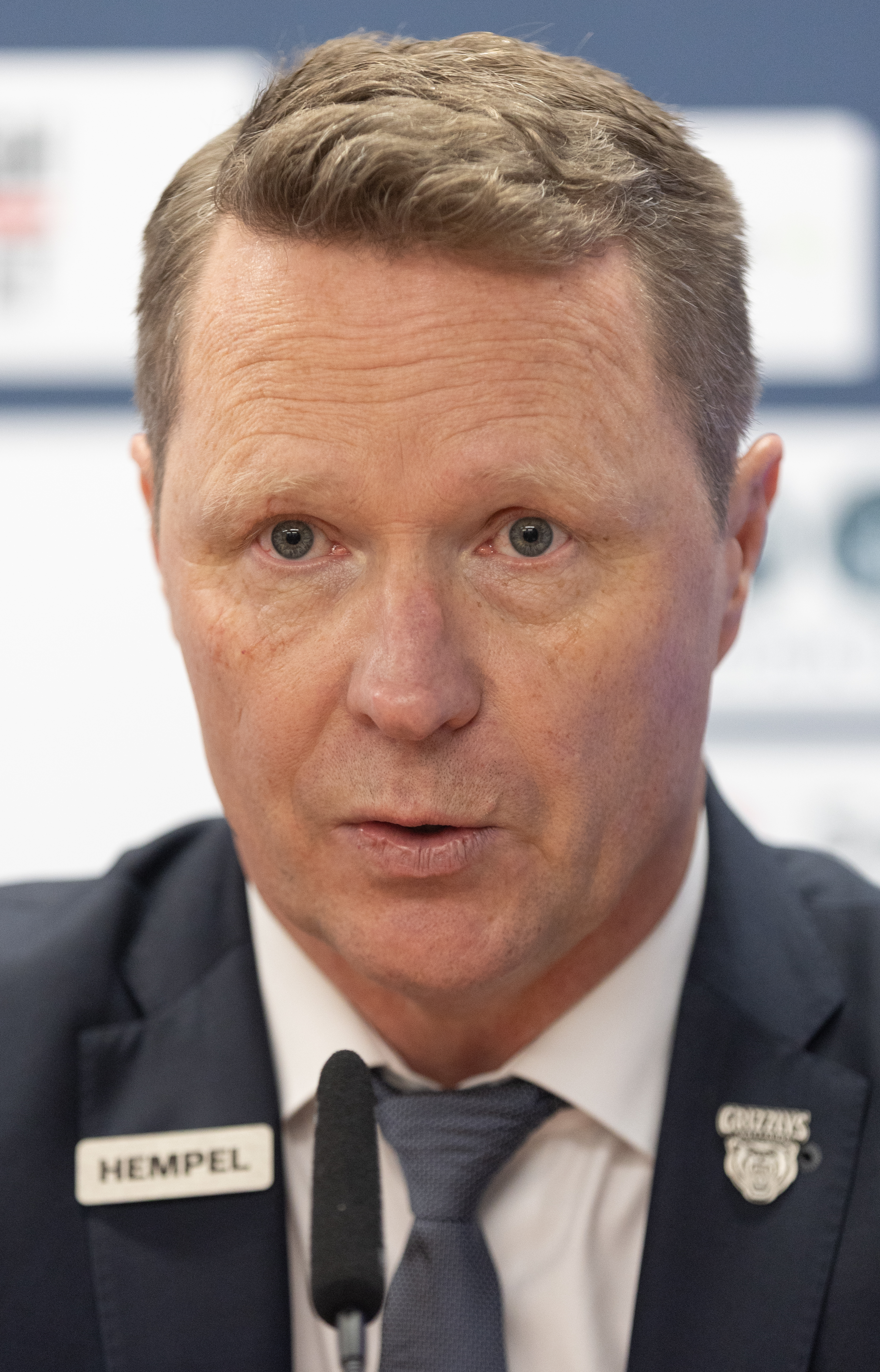
- Born: May 30, 1972 (age 53) Calgary, Alberta, Canada
- Height: 6 ft 2 in (188 cm)
- Weight: 210 lb (95 kg; 15 st 0 lb)
- Position: Defense
- Shot: Left
- Played for: Binghamton Rangers; Detroit Vipers; Springfield Falcons; Rochester Americans; Manitoba Moose; Frankfurt Lions; EC VSV
- National team: Canada and Austria
- NHL draft: 13th overall, 1990; New York Rangers
- Playing career: 1992–2010

Michael Stewart (born May 30, 1972) is a Canadian-Austrian former professional ice hockey defenceman who has become a coach after his playing days. He was drafted in the first round, thirteenth overall, of the 1990 NHL entry draft by the New York Rangers, but never played a game in the NHL.

== Playing career ==
Stewart attended Michigan State University for three seasons before signing with the New York Rangers in 1992. He then played for the Rangers' AHL affiliate Binghamton Rangers for three seasons before being traded to the Hartford Whalers with Glen Featherstone in return for Pat Verbeek. Stewart then played for the Springfield Falcons (AHL) and Detroit Vipers (IHL) before playing with the Canadian National Team in 1996–97. After a three-year stint with the Manitoba Moose of the IHL, Stewart spent the 2000-01 campaign with the Frankfurt Lions of the German DEL, before moving to Austria for the following season. Stewart played for EC VSV from 2001 to 2010, winning the Austrian championship in 2002 and 2006. He also represented the Austrian national team at the 2005, 2006, and 2007 World Championships. After an 18-year playing career Stewart retired as a member of the EC VSV. He is one of four players in the history of EC VSV hockey to have his jersey number retired.

== Coaching career ==
He started his coaching career as assistant coach to Johan Strömwall at EC VSV. In February 2011, he was promoted to head coach after Strömwall had stepped down.

Stewart moved to coach the Fischtown Pinguins of the German DEL2 in May 2012 and guided the team to the 2013-14 DEL2 championship, while being named DEL2 Coach of the Year. At the 2014 and 2016 Deutschland-Cup, he served as assistant coach of the Canadian national team. On April 30, 2015, he accepted an offer to become the head coach of German DEL side Augsburger Panther.

In the 2018–19 season, he guided Augsburg to a playoff-semifinal appearance, before signing with fellow DEL team Kölner Haie in April 2019. Stewart tenure was brief with Kölner Haie unable to see out the 2019–20 season, as he was replaced by Uwe Krupp on February 24, 2020.

== Personal ==
Stewart received Austrian citizenship in March 2005. He has two daughters and a son.

== Career statistics ==
=== Regular season and playoffs ===
			Regular season					Playoffs
Season	Team	League	GP	G	A	Pts	PIM	GP	G	A	Pts	PIM
1989–90	Michigan State University	CCHA	45	2	6	8	45	—	—	—	—	—
1990–91	Michigan State University	CCHA	37	3	12	15	58	—	—	—	—	—
1991–92	Michigan State University	CCHA	8	1	3	4	6	—	—	—	—	—
1992–93	Binghamton Rangers	AHL	68	2	10	12	71	1	0	0	0	0
1993–94	Binghamton Rangers	AHL	79	8	42	50	75	—	—	—	—	—
1994–95	Binghamton Rangers	AHL	68	6	21	27	83	—	—	—	—	—
1994–95	Springfield Falcons	AHL	7	0	3	3	21	—	—	—	—	—
1995–96	Detroit Vipers	IHL	41	6	6	12	95	—	—	—	—	—
1995–96	Springfield Falcons	AHL	29	2	6	8	44	10	1	3	4	22
1996–97	Canada	Intl	60	12	20	32	87	—	—	—	—	—
1996–97	Rochester Americans	AHL	4	0	0	0	0	9	1	3	4	23
1997–98	Manitoba Moose	IHL	69	5	19	24	133	3	0	1	1	8
1998–99	Manitoba Moose	IHL	77	5	10	15	136	5	0	1	1	11
1999–2000	Manitoba Moose	IHL	76	6	11	17	156	2	0	0	0	0
2000–01	Frankfurt Lions	DEL	58	1	9	10	130	—	—	—	—	—
2001–02	EC VSV	AUT	30	6	11	17	105	16	4	11	15	42
2002–03	EC VSV	AUT	41	3	12	15	75	13	1	6	7	50
2003–04	EC VSV	AUT	47	2	16	18	89	8	1	2	3	14
2004–05	EC VSV	AUT	47	5	15	20	109	3	0	0	0	6
2005–06	EC VSV	AUT	47	0	12	12	79	13	3	5	8	22
2006–07	EC VSV	AUT	55	4	15	19	129	7	0	2	2	39
2007–08	EC VSV	AUT	45	5	14	19	154	5	0	1	1	4
2008–09	EC VSV	AUT	45	3	21	24	110	6	0	3	3	2
2009–10	EC VSV	AUT	49	5	11	16	71	5	1	1	2	2
AHL totals			255	18	82	100	294	20	2	6	8	45
IHL totals			263	22	46	68	520	10	0	2	2	19
AUT totals			406	33	127	160	921	76	10	31	41	181

=== International ===
Year	Team	Event	GP	G	A	Pts	PIM
2005	Austria	WC	5	0	0	0	4
2006	Austria	WC D1	5	1	1	2	6
2007	Austria	WC	6	1	1	2	6
Senior totals			11	1	1	2	10

Awards and achievements
Preceded by Steven Rice	New York Rangers first-round draft pick 1990	Succeeded by Alexei Kovalev
