= Brent Thompson =

Canadian ice hockey player and coach (born 1971)

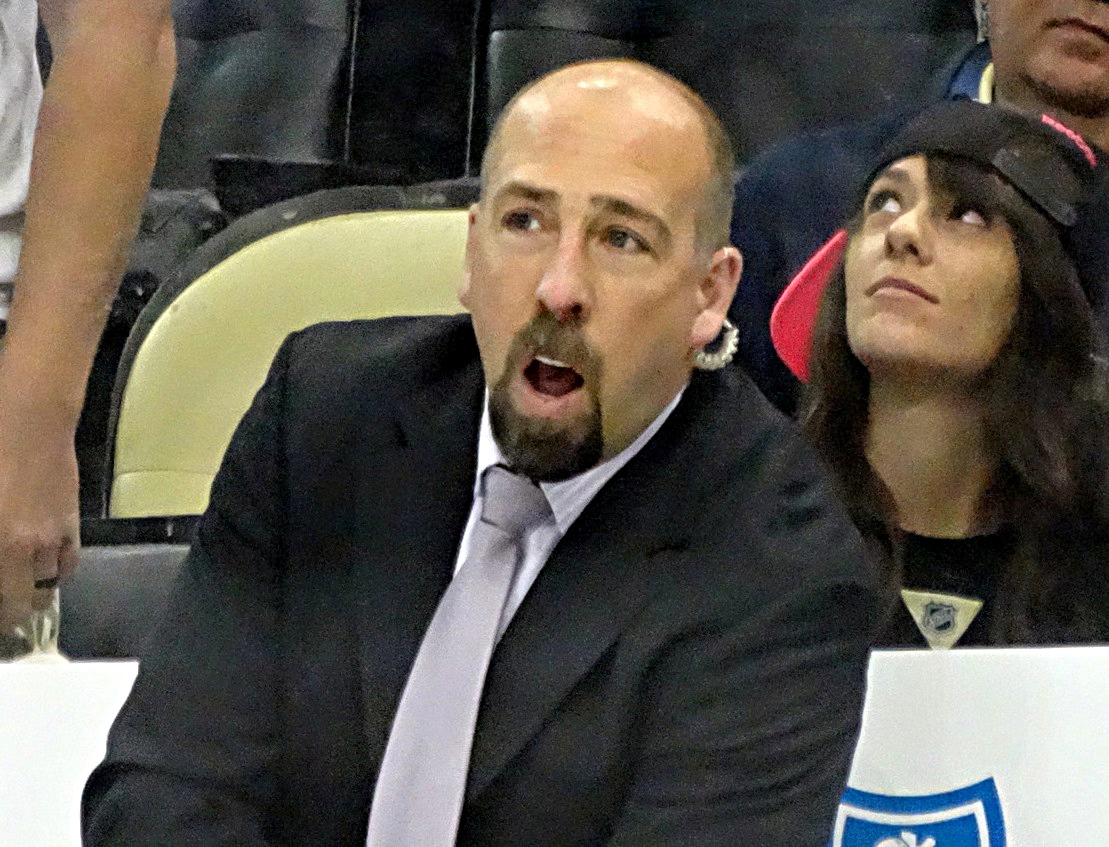
- Thompson with the New York Islanders in 2013
- Born: January 9, 1971 (age 55) Calgary, Alberta, Canada
- Height: 6 ft 2 in (188 cm)
- Weight: 210 lb (95 kg; 15 st 0 lb)
- Position: Defence
- Shot: Left
- Played for: Los Angeles Kings; Winnipeg Jets; Phoenix Coyotes
- NHL draft: 39th overall, 1989; Los Angeles Kings
- Playing career: 1990–2005

Brent Keith Thompson (born January 9, 1971) is a Canadian former professional defenceman who last served as an assistant coach for the Anaheim Ducks of the National Hockey League (NHL). Thompson played 121 games in the National Hockey League with the Winnipeg Jets, Phoenix Coyotes and Los Angeles Kings.

== Coaching career ==
Thompson was formerly the head coach of the Alaska Aces of the ECHL, where he led them to a Kelly Cup Championship in the 2010–11 season. During the 2011–12 season, Thompson was the head coach for the Bridgeport Sound Tigers of the American Hockey League, affiliate of the New York Islanders of the National Hockey League. In June 2012, the Islanders announced that Thompson would be promoted to assistant coach under Islanders head coach Jack Capuano. To start the 2014–2015 season, Thompson was once again named the head coach for the Bridgeport Sound Tigers of the American Hockey League.

== Personal ==
Thompson is married to Kimberly Oliver, a native of Phoenix, Arizona who he met during his stint with the Phoenix Roadrunners of the International Hockey League.

The couple have two sons, Tage and Tyce, who are both professional ice hockey players.

== Career statistics ==
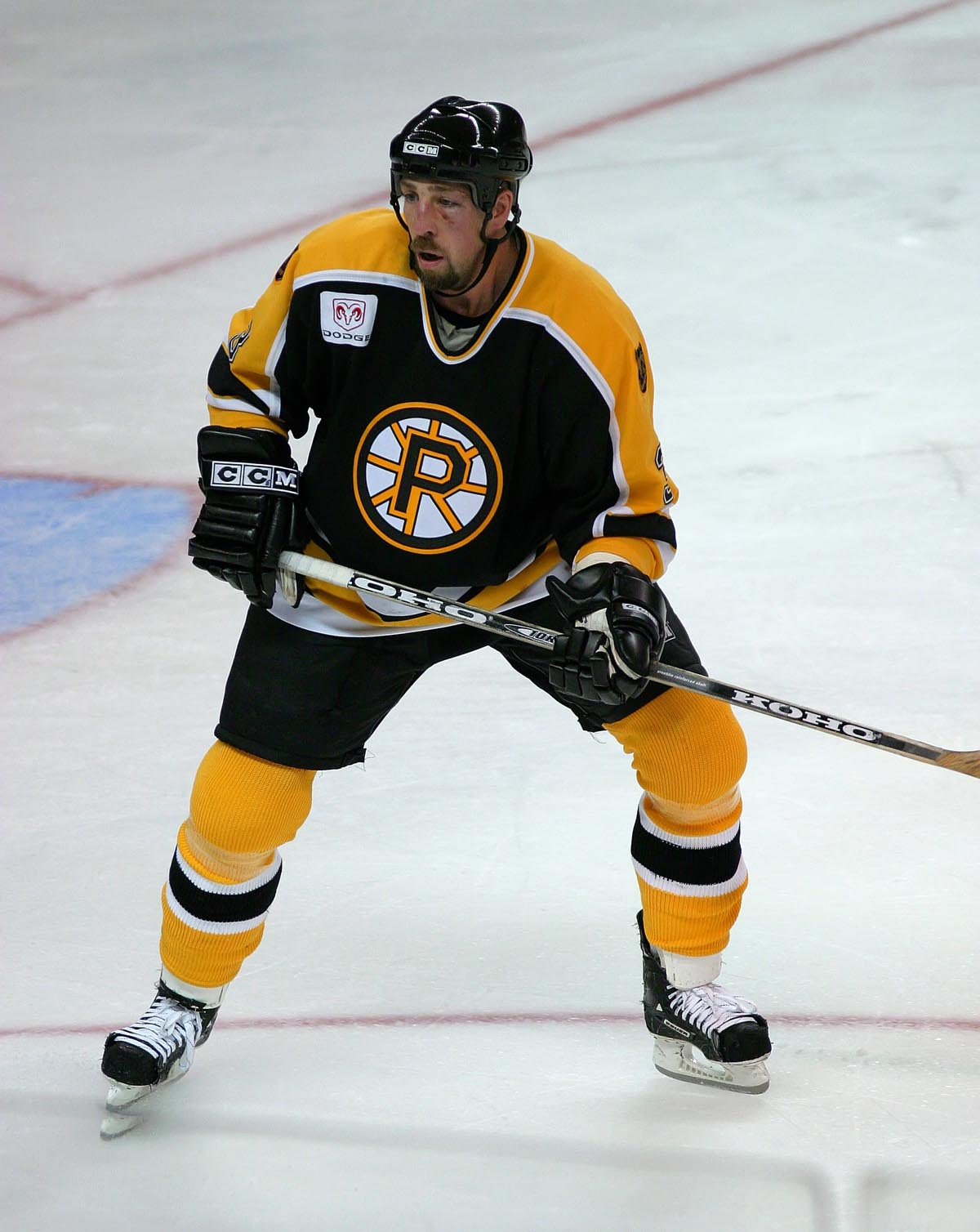
Thompson with the Providence Bruins in 2004

=== Regular season and playoffs ===
			Regular season					Playoffs
Season	Team	League	GP	G	A	Pts	PIM	GP	G	A	Pts	PIM
1987–88	Calgary Northstars U18	AMHL	25	0	13	13	33	—	—	—	—	—
1988–89	Medicine Hat Tigers	WHL	72	3	10	13	160	3	0	0	0	2
1989–90	Medicine Hat Tigers	WHL	68	10	35	45	167	3	0	1	1	14
1990–91	Medicine Hat Tigers	WHL	51	5	40	45	87	12	1	7	8	16
1990–91	Phoenix Roadrunners	IHL	—	—	—	—	—	4	0	1	1	6
1991–92	Phoenix Roadrunners	IHL	42	4	13	17	139	—	—	—	—	—
1991–92	Los Angeles Kings	NHL	27	0	5	5	89	4	0	0	0	4
1992–93	Los Angeles Kings	NHL	30	0	4	4	76	—	—	—	—	—
1992–93	Phoenix Roadrunners	IHL	22	0	5	5	112	—	—	—	—	—
1993–94	Los Angeles Kings	NHL	24	1	0	1	81	—	—	—	—	—
1993–94	Phoenix Roadrunners	IHL	26	1	11	12	118	—	—	—	—	—
1994–95	Winnipeg Jets	NHL	29	0	0	0	78	—	—	—	—	—
1995–96	Winnipeg Jets	NHL	10	0	1	1	21	—	—	—	—	—
1995–96	Springfield Falcons	AHL	58	2	10	12	203	10	1	4	5	55
1996–97	Phoenix Coyotes	NHL	1	0	0	0	7	—	—	—	—	—
1996–97	Phoenix Roadrunners	IHL	12	0	1	1	67	—	—	—	—	—
1996–97	Springfield Falcons	AHL	64	2	15	17	215	17	0	2	2	31
1997–98	Hartford Wolf Pack	AHL	77	4	15	19	308	15	0	4	4	25
1998–99	Hartford Wolf Pack	AHL	76	3	15	18	265	7	0	0	0	23
1999–00	Louisville Panthers	AHL	67	4	22	26	311	3	0	0	0	11
2000–01	Louisville Panthers	AHL	59	1	9	10	170	—	—	—	—	—
2000–01	Hershey Bears	AHL	15	0	1	1	44	12	0	0	0	10
2001–02	Hershey Bears	AHL	79	8	16	24	178	8	0	0	0	21
2002–03	Hershey Bears	AHL	61	2	17	19	134	3	0	0	0	7
2003–04	Colorado Eagles	CHL	61	5	24	29	172	4	0	1	1	10
2004–05	Providence Bruins	AHL	79	3	9	12	256	16	1	2	3	19
AHL totals			635	29	129	158	2084	91	2	12	14	202
NHL totals			121	1	10	11	352	4	0	0	0	4

== Awards and honours ==
Award	Year
WHL
East Second All-Star Team	1991
IHL
All-Star Game	1992
AHL
Yanick Dupre Memorial Award	1999
ECHL
Coach of the Year	2011
