= Ben Hankinson =

American ice hockey player

- Born: May 1, 1969 (age 57) Edina, Minnesota, U.S.
- Height: 6 ft 2 in (188 cm)
- Weight: 210 lb (95 kg; 15 st 0 lb)
- Position: Right Wing
- Shot: Right
- Played for: NHL; New Jersey Devils; Tampa Bay Lightning; IHL; Grand Rapids Griffins; Orlando Solar Bears; AHL; Utica Devils; Albany River Rats; Adirondack Red Wings
- Playing career: 1992–1998

Benjamin John Hankinson (born May 1, 1969) is an American former professional ice hockey right winger.

== Playing career ==
Hankinson played 43 games in the National Hockey League for the New Jersey Devils and Tampa Bay Lightning between 1993 and 1995. He was a First Team All-Star in the Western Collegiate Hockey Association for the University of Minnesota in 1990. He retired from professional hockey in 1998.

== Personal life ==
Ben is currently a certified NHLPA player agent, and is the USA Director of Player Representation for Octagon Hockey. Some of his clients include Dustin Byfuglien, Paul Martin, Jordan Leopold, Mike Lundin, Raitis Ivanans, Tim Jackman, Ryan McDonagh, John Scott, Brock Boeser and Bobby Brink.

== Career statistics ==
=== Regular season and playoffs ===
| | | | Regular season | | | | | Playoffs |
| Season | Team | League | GP | G | A | Pts | PIM | GP | G | A | Pts | PIM |
|---|---|---|---|---|---|---|---|---|---|---|---|---|
| 1987–88 | U. of Minnesota | WCHA | 24 | 4 | 7 | 11 | 36 | — | — | — | — | — |
| 1988–89 | U. of Minnesota | WCHA | 43 | 7 | 11 | 18 | 115 | — | — | — | — | — |
| 1989–90 | U. of Minnesota | WCHA | 45 | 19 | 12 | 31 | 116 | — | — | — | — | — |
| 1990–91 | U. of Minnesota | WCHA | 43 | 19 | 21 | 40 | 133 | — | — | — | — | — |
| 1991–92 | Utica Devils | AHL | 77 | 17 | 16 | 33 | 186 | 4 | 3 | 1 | 4 | 2 |
| 1992–93 | Utica Devils | AHL | 75 | 35 | 27 | 62 | 145 | 5 | 2 | 2 | 4 | 6 |
| 1992–93 | New Jersey Devils | NHL | 4 | 2 | 1 | 3 | 9 | — | — | — | — | — |
| 1993–94 | New Jersey Devils | NHL | 13 | 1 | 0 | 1 | 23 | 2 | 1 | 0 | 1 | 4 |
| 1993–94 | Albany River Rats | AHL | 29 | 9 | 14 | 23 | 80 | 5 | 3 | 1 | 4 | 6 |
| 1994–95 | Albany River Rats | AHL | 1 | 1 | 0 | 1 | 6 | — | — | — | — | — |
| 1994–95 | New Jersey Devils | NHL | 8 | 0 | 0 | 0 | 7 | — | — | — | — | — |
| 1994–95 | Tampa Bay Lightning | NHL | 18 | 0 | 2 | 2 | 6 | — | — | — | — | — |
| 1995–96 | Adirondack Red Wings | AHL | 75 | 25 | 21 | 46 | 210 | 3 | 0 | 0 | 0 | 8 |
| 1996–97 | Grand Rapids Griffins | IHL | 68 | 16 | 13 | 29 | 219 | 5 | 2 | 2 | 4 | 4 |
| 1997–98 | Orlando Solar Bears | IHL | 80 | 15 | 15 | 30 | 221 | 14 | 0 | 4 | 4 | 47 |
| NHL totals | | | 43 | 3 | 3 | 6 | 45 | 2 | 1 | 0 | 1 | 47 |
