= Mark Ferner =

Canadian ice hockey player (born 1965)

- Born: September 5, 1965 (age 60) Regina, Saskatchewan, Canada
- Height: 6 ft 0 in (183 cm)
- Weight: 195 lb (88 kg; 13 st 13 lb)
- Position: Defence
- Shot: Left
- Played for: Buffalo Sabres; Washington Capitals; Mighty Ducks of Anaheim; Detroit Red Wings
- NHL draft: 194th overall, 1983; Buffalo Sabres
- Playing career: 1985–2001

Mark E. Ferner (born September 5, 1965) is a Canadian former professional ice hockey defenceman.

Ferner was born in Regina, Saskatchewan. Selected 194th overall by the Buffalo Sabres in the 1983 NHL entry draft, Ferner also played for the Washington Capitals, Mighty Ducks of Anaheim, and Detroit Red Wings, playing a total of 94 regular season games, scoring 3 goals and 10 assists for 13 points and collecting 51 penalty minutes.

== Career statistics ==
			Regular season					Playoffs
Season	Team	League	GP	G	A	Pts	PIM	GP	G	A	Pts	PIM
1982–83	Kamloops Junior Oilers	WHL	69	6	15	21	81	7	0	0	0	7
1983–84	Kamloops Junior Oilers	WHL	72	9	30	39	169	14	1	8	9	20
1984–85	Kamloops Blazers	WHL	69	15	39	54	91	15	4	9	13	21
1985–86	Rochester Americans	AHL	63	2	13	15	87	—	—	—	—	—
1986–87	Buffalo Sabres	NHL	13	0	3	3	9	—	—	—	—	—
1986–87	Rochester Americans	AHL	54	0	12	12	157	—	—	—	—	—
1987–88	Rochester Americans	AHL	69	1	25	26	165	7	1	4	5	31
1988–89	Buffalo Sabres	NHL	2	0	0	0	2	—	—	—	—	—
1988–89	Rochester Americans	AHL	55	0	18	18	97	—	—	—	—	—
1989–90	Washington Capitals	NHL	2	0	0	0	0	—	—	—	—	—
1989–90	Baltimore Skipjacks	AHL	74	7	28	35	76	11	1	2	3	21
1990–91	Washington Capitals	NHL	7	0	1	1	4	—	—	—	—	—
1990–91	Baltimore Skipjacks	AHL	61	14	40	54	38	6	1	4	5	24
1991–92	Baltimore Skipjacks	AHL	57	7	38	45	67	—	—	—	—	—
1991–92	St. John's Maple Leafs	AHL	15	1	8	9	6	14	2	14	16	38
1992–93	San Diego Gulls	IHL	26	0	15	15	34	11	1	2	3	8
1992–93	New Haven Senators	AHL	34	5	7	12	69	—	—	—	—	—
1993–94	Mighty Ducks of Anaheim	NHL	50	3	5	8	30	—	—	—	—	—
1994–95	Mighty Ducks of Anaheim	NHL	14	0	1	1	6	—	—	—	—	—
1994–95	Detroit Red Wings	NHL	3	0	0	0	0	—	—	—	—	—
1994–95	San Diego Gulls	IHL	46	3	12	15	51	—	—	—	—	—
1994–95	Adirondack Red Wings	AHL	3	0	0	0	2	1	0	0	0	0
1995–96	Orlando Solar Bears	IHL	43	4	18	22	37	23	4	10	14	8
1996–97	Orlando Solar Bears	IHL	61	12	18	30	55	—	—	—	—	—
1996–97	Long Beach Ice Dogs	IHL	17	2	6	8	31	18	3	4	7	6
1997–98	Kassel Huskies	DEL	10	1	1	2	12	—	—	—	—	—
1997–98	Kassel Huskies	Euro HL	3	0	0	0	0	—	—	—	—	—
1997–98	Long Beach Ice Dogs	IHL	65	1	30	31	66	16	2	11	13	10
1998–99	Long Beach Ice Dogs	IHL	59	2	24	26	78	8	1	3	4	14
1999–00	SERC Wild Wings	DEL	21	2	3	5	30	—	—	—	—	—
1999–00	Houston Aeros	IHL	25	2	6	8	20	—	—	—	—	—
2000–01	Long Beach Ice Dogs	WCHL	19	2	13	15	24	7	0	6	6	2
NHL totals			91	3	10	13	51	—	—	—	—	—
AHL totals			485	37	189	226	764	39	5	24	29	114

== Awards ==
- WHL West First All-Star Team – 1985
