= 1994–95 Los Angeles Kings season =

National Hockey League team season

1994–95 Los Angeles Kings
- Division: 4th Pacific
- Conference: 9th Western
- 1994–95 record: 16–23–9
- Home record: 7–11–6
- Road record: 9–12–3
- Goals for: 142
- Goals against: 174

Team information
- General manager: Sam McMaster
- Coach: Barry Melrose (Jan.–Apr.); Rogie Vachon (Apr.–May)
- Captain: Wayne Gretzky
- Alternate captains: Rob Blake; Rick Tocchet
- Arena: Great Western Forum
- Average attendance: 15,397
- Minor league affiliates: Phoenix Roadrunners; Knoxville Cherokees; Muskegon Fury

Team leaders
- Goals: Rick Tocchet (18)
- Assists: Wayne Gretzky (37)
- Points: Wayne Gretzky (48)
- Penalty minutes: Michel Petit (84)
- Plus/minus: Tony Granato (+9)
- Wins: Kelly Hrudey (14)
- Goals against average: Kelly Hrudey (3.14)

The 1994–95 Los Angeles Kings season, was the Kings' 28th season in the National Hockey League (NHL). It saw the Kings finish fifth in the Pacific Division with a record of 16–23–9, for 41 points. Defense proved to be problematic for the Kings, as they allowed a league-high 1,668 shots (34.8 per game) and finished tied for 23rd overall in goals allowed, with 174. Their offense was more reliable, as the Kings averaged nearly three goals scored per game. Despite missing a quarter of the season, Rick Tocchet still led the team in goals with 18.

On May 2, the Dallas Stars were in seventh place in the Western Conference with 42 points while the Kings were tied with the San Jose Sharks for eighth place with 41 points (16–22–9). However, the Kings lost the final game of the season on May 3 to the Chicago Blackhawks by a score of 5–1, finishing in ninth place and therefore missed the playoffs and both San Jose and Dallas clinch playoff berths. After that, the Sharks came from behind to tie the Vancouver Canucks 3–3 in their final game of the season and, in doing so, jumped up to seventh place while the Stars fell to eighth place.

== Regular season ==
On April 21, head coach Barry Melrose was fired after six consecutive losses and replaced by Kings president Rogie Vachon.

=== Final standings ===
Pacific Division
No.	CR		GP	W	L	T	GF	GA	Pts
1	2	**Calgary Flames**	48	24	17	7	163	135	55
2	6	**Vancouver Canucks**	48	18	18	12	153	148	48
3	7	**San Jose Sharks**	48	19	25	4	129	161	42
4	9	Los Angeles Kings	48	16	23	9	142	174	41
5	11	Edmonton Oilers	48	17	27	4	136	183	38
6	12	Mighty Ducks of Anaheim	48	16	27	5	125	164	37

Note: No. = Division rank, CR = Conference rank, W = Wins, L = Losses, T = Ties, GF = Goals For, GA = Goals Against, Pts = Points
Teams that qualified for the playoffs are highlighted in bold.

Western Conference
R		Div	GP	W	L	T	GF	GA	Pts
**1**	**p – Detroit Red Wings**	**CEN**	**48**	**33**	**11**	**4**	**180**	**117**	**70**
**2**	**x – Calgary Flames**	**PAC**	**48**	**24**	**17**	**7**	**163**	**135**	**55**
**3**	**St. Louis Blues**	**CEN**	**48**	**28**	**15**	**5**	**178**	**135**	**61**
**4**	**Chicago Blackhawks**	**CEN**	**48**	**24**	**19**	**5**	**156**	**115**	**53**
**5**	**Toronto Maple Leafs**	**CEN**	**48**	**21**	**19**	**8**	**135**	**146**	**50**
**6**	**Vancouver Canucks**	**PAC**	**48**	**18**	**18**	**12**	**153**	**148**	**48**
**7**	**San Jose Sharks**	**PAC**	**48**	**19**	**25**	**4**	**129**	**161**	**42**
**8**	**Dallas Stars**	**CEN**	**48**	**17**	**23**	**8**	**136**	**135**	**42**
9	Los Angeles Kings	PAC	48	16	23	9	142	174	41
10	Winnipeg Jets	CEN	48	16	25	7	157	177	39
11	Edmonton Oilers	PAC	48	17	27	4	136	183	38
12	Mighty Ducks of Anaheim	PAC	48	16	27	5	125	164	37

Divisions: CEN – Central, PAC – Pacific

bold – Qualified for playoffs; x – Won division; p – Won Presidents' Trophy

== Schedule and results ==
1994–95 regular season
January: 1–4–1 (home: 1–3–1; road: 0–1–0)

Game	Date	Score	Opponent	Record	Recap
1	January 20, 1995	3–3 OT	Toronto Maple Leafs (1994–95)	0–0–1	T
2	January 22, 1995	3–4	Edmonton Oilers (1994–95)	0–1–1	L
3	January 24, 1995	2–4	Dallas Stars (1994–95)	0–2–1	L
4	January 26, 1995	1–3	@ St. Louis Blues (1994–95)	0–3–1	L
5	January 28, 1995	4–2	Winnipeg Jets (1994–95)	1–3–1	W
6	January 29, 1995	3–6	Chicago Blackhawks (1994–95)	1–4–1	L

February: 4–5–3 (home: 1–4–1; road: 3–1–2)

Game	Date	Score	Opponent	Record	Recap
7	February 4, 1995	4–3	Detroit Red Wings (1994–95)	2–4–1	W
8	February 5, 1995	2–3	Mighty Ducks of Anaheim (1994–95)	2–5–1	L
9	February 7, 1995	5–5 OT	@ St. Louis Blues (1994–95)	2–5–2	T
10	February 11, 1995	5–2	@ Toronto Maple Leafs (1994–95)	3–5–2	W
11	February 12, 1995	4–4 OT	@ Detroit Red Wings (1994–95)	3–5–3	T
12	February 15, 1995	3–1	@ Dallas Stars (1994–95)	4–5–3	W
13	February 17, 1995	0–2	San Jose Sharks (1994–95)	4–6–3	L
14	February 18, 1995	2–6	Vancouver Canucks (1994–95)	4–7–3	L
15	February 20, 1995	2–8	@ Vancouver Canucks (1994–95)	4–8–3	L
16	February 23, 1995	3–3 OT	Calgary Flames (1994–95)	4–8–4	T
17	February 25, 1995	4–3	@ Edmonton Oilers (1994–95)	5–8–4	W
18	February 28, 1995	4–8	Chicago Blackhawks (1994–95)	5–9–4	L

March: 6–6–2 (home: 1–3–1; road: 5–3–1)

Game	Date	Score	Opponent	Record	Recap
19	March 4, 1995	4–5	Vancouver Canucks (1994–95)	5–10–4	L
20	March 6, 1995	2–8	@ Dallas Stars (1994–95)	5–11–4	L
21	March 9, 1995	4–3	@ Chicago Blackhawks (1994–95)	6–11–4	W
22	March 11, 1995	4–2	@ Winnipeg Jets (1994–95)	7–11–4	W
23	March 13, 1995	4–1	@ Toronto Maple Leafs (1994–95)	8–11–4	W
24	March 14, 1995	2–5	@ Detroit Red Wings (1994–95)	8–12–4	L
25	March 16, 1995	2–2 OT	St. Louis Blues (1994–95)	8–12–5	T
26	March 18, 1995	3–5	Toronto Maple Leafs (1994–95)	8–13–5	L
27	March 20, 1995	5–3	St. Louis Blues (1994–95)	9–13–5	W
28	March 21, 1995	3–3 OT	@ Mighty Ducks of Anaheim (1994–95)	9–13–6	T
29	March 25, 1995	1–3	San Jose Sharks (1994–95)	9–14–6	L
30	March 26, 1995	7–3	@ San Jose Sharks (1994–95)	10–14–6	W
31	March 28, 1995	5–3	@ Calgary Flames (1994–95)	11–14–6	W
32	March 29, 1995	2–5	@ Vancouver Canucks (1994–95)	11–15–6	L

April: 4–7–3 (home: 4–1–3; road: 0–6–0)

Game	Date	Score	Opponent	Record	Recap
33	April 1, 1995	7–7 OT	Winnipeg Jets (1994–95)	11–15–7	T
34	April 3, 1995	7–2	Edmonton Oilers (1994–95)	12–15–7	W
35	April 6, 1995	3–2	Dallas Stars (1994–95)	13–15–7	W
36	April 7, 1995	4–7	@ Calgary Flames (1994–95)	13–16–7	L
37	April 9, 1995	1–5	@ Mighty Ducks of Anaheim (1994–95)	13–17–7	L
38	April 12, 1995	1–4	Calgary Flames (1994–95)	13–18–7	L
39	April 16, 1995	0–2	@ San Jose Sharks (1994–95)	13–19–7	L
40	April 17, 1995	2–5	@ Calgary Flames (1994–95)	13–20–7	L
41	April 19, 1995	0–2	@ Edmonton Oilers (1994–95)	13–21–7	L
42	April 21, 1995	3–3 OT	Edmonton Oilers (1994–95)	13–21–8	T
43	April 23, 1995	2–2 OT	Mighty Ducks of Anaheim (1994–95)	13–21–9	T
44	April 25, 1995	5–1	Detroit Red Wings (1994–95)	14–21–9	W
45	April 28, 1995	0–4	@ San Jose Sharks (1994–95)	14–22–9	L
46	April 30, 1995	2–1	Mighty Ducks of Anaheim (1994–95)	15–22–9	W

May: 1–1–0 (home: 0–0–0; road: 1–1–0)

Game	Date	Score	Opponent	Record	Recap
47	May 2, 1995	2–1	@ Winnipeg Jets (1994–95)	16–22–9	W
48	May 3, 1995	1–5	@ Chicago Blackhawks (1994–95)	16–23–9	L

Legend: W Win (2 points) L Loss (0 points) T Tie (1 point)

== Player statistics ==
=== Scoring ===
- Position abbreviations: C = Center; D = Defense; G = Goaltender; LW = Left wing; RW = Right wing
- † = Joined team via a transaction (e.g., trade, waivers, signing) during the season. Stats reflect time with the Kings only.
- ‡ = Left team via a transaction (e.g., trade, waivers, release) during the season. Stats reflect time with the Kings only.

No.	Player	Pos	Regular season					
No.	Player	Pos	GP	G	A	Pts	+/-	PIM
99	Wayne Gretzky	C	48	11	37	48	−20	6
22 (Note: Tocchet wore number 92 through March 14.)	Rick Tocchet	RW	36	18	17	35	−8	70
7	Dan Quinn	C	44	14	17	31	−3	32
17	Jari Kurri	RW	38	10	19	29	−17	24
21	Tony Granato	LW	33	13	11	24	9	68
25	Darryl Sydor	D	48	4	19	23	−2	36
33	Marty McSorley	D	41	3	18	21	−14	83
19	John Druce	RW	43	15	5	20	−3	20
44	Randy Burridge†	LW	38	4	15	19	−4	8
24	Michel Petit	D	40	5	12	17	4	84
28	Eric Lacroix	LW	45	9	7	16	2	54
15	Pat Conacher	LW	48	7	9	16	−9	12
13	Robert Lang	C	36	4	8	12	−7	4
4	Rob Blake	D	24	4	7	11	−16	38
12	Kevin Todd	C	33	3	8	11	−5	12
14	Gary Shuchuk	C	22	3	6	9	−2	6
77	Rob Cowie	D	32	2	7	9	−6	20
29	Chris Snell	D	32	2	7	9	−7	22
39	Yanic Perreault	C	26	2	5	7	3	20
2	Alexei Zhitnik‡	D	11	2	5	7	−3	27
8	Kevin Brown	RW	23	2	3	5	−7	18
55	Troy Crowder	RW	29	1	2	3	0	99
11	Mike Donnelly‡	LW	9	1	1	2	−7	4
6	Sean O'Donnell	D	15	0	2	2	−2	49
26	Philippe Boucher†	D	6	1	0	1	−3	4
34	Matt Johnson	LW	14	1	0	1	0	102
10	Jeff Shevalier	LW	1	1	0	1	1	0
35	Arto Blomsten†	D	4	0	1	1	2	0
22	Charlie Huddy‡	D	9	0	1	1	−6	6
9	Rob Brown	RW	2	0	0	0	−2	0
31	Grant Fuhr†	G	14	0	0	0		2
32	Kelly Hrudey	G	35	0	0	0		0
36	Pauli Jaks	G	1	0	0	0		0
38	Eric Lavigne	D	1	0	0	0	−1	0
10	Warren Rychel‡	LW	7	0	0	0	−5	19
35	Robb Stauber‡	G	1	0	0	0		0
31	Jamie Storr	G	5	0	0	0		0
27	Dave Thomlinson	LW	1	0	0	0	−1	0
3	Denis Tsygurov†	D	21	0	0	0	−2	11
5	Tim Watters	D	1	0	0	0	1	0

=== Goaltending ===
- † = Joined team via a transaction (e.g., trade, waivers, signing) during the season. Stats reflect time with the Kings only.
- ‡ = Left team via a transaction (e.g., trade, waivers, release) during the season. Stats reflect time with the Kings only.

No.	Player	Regular season									
No.	Player	GP	W	L	T	SA	GA	GAA	SV%	SO	TOI
32	Kelly Hrudey	35	14	13	5	1099	99	3.14	.910	0	1894
31	Grant Fuhr†	14	1	7	3	379	47	4.04	.876	0	698
31	Jamie Storr	5	1	3	1	152	17	3.87	.888	0	263
36	Pauli Jaks	1	0	0	0	25	2	3.00	.920	0	40
35	Robb Stauber‡	1	0	0	0	6	2	7.33	.667	0	16

== Awards and records ==
=== Awards ===
Type	Award/honor	Recipient	Ref
Team	Best Newcomer	Rick Tocchet	
Team	Bill Libby Memorial Award	Kelly Hrudey	
Team	Defensive Player	Pat Conacher	
Team	Jim Fox Community Service	Tony Granato	
Team	Leading Scorer	Wayne Gretzky	
Team	Most Inspirational	Kelly Hrudey	
Team	Most Popular Player	Kelly Hrudey	
Team	Outstanding Defenseman	Darryl Sydor	
Team	Unsung Hero	Pat Conacher	

=== Milestones ===
Milestone	Player	Date	Ref
First game	Matt Johnson	January 22, 1995	
First game	Sean O'Donnell	January 24, 1995	
First game	Jamie Storr	January 24, 1995	
First game	Kevin Brown	January 28, 1995	
First game	Pauli Jaks	January 29, 1995	
First game	Rob Cowie	February 5, 1995	
First game	Eric Lavigne	February 20, 1995	
First game	Jeff Shevalier	April 7, 1995	
1,000th game played	Jari Kurri	February 11, 1995	

== Transactions ==
The Kings were involved in the following transactions during the 1994–95 season.

=== Trades ===
June 25, 1994	To Los Angeles Kings 7th round pick in 1995 – Benoit Larose	To Ottawa Senators Jim Paek
July 11, 1994	To Los Angeles Kings Yanic Perreault	To Toronto Maple Leafs 4th round pick in 1996 – Mikael Simons
July 26, 1994	To Los Angeles Kings Sean O'Donnell	To Buffalo Sabres Doug Houda
July 29, 1994	To Los Angeles Kings Rick Tocchet; 2nd round pick in 1995 – Pavel Rosa	To Pittsburgh Penguins Luc Robitaille
August 8, 1994	To Los Angeles Kings Ruslan Batyrshin; 2nd round pick in 1996 – Marian Ciser; 6th round pick in 1996 – Brian Willsie	To Winnipeg Jets Brent Thompson; 6th round pick in 1996 – Robert Esche
October 3, 1994	To Los Angeles Kings Eric Lacroix; Chris Snell; 4th round pick in 1996 – Eric Belanger	To Toronto Maple Leafs Dixon Ward; Guy Leveque; Shayne Toporowski; Kelly Fairchild
February 10, 1995	To Los Angeles Kings Randy Burridge	To Washington Capitals Warren Rychel
February 14, 1995	To Los Angeles Kings Philippe Boucher; Denis Tsygurov; Grant Fuhr	To Buffalo Sabres Alexei Zhitnik; Robb Stauber; Charlie Huddy; 5th round pick in 1995 – Marian Menhart
February 17, 1995	To Los Angeles Kings 4th round pick in 1996 – Justin Davis	To Dallas Stars Mike Donnelly; 7th round pick in 1996 – Eoin McInerney
March 27, 1995	To Los Angeles Kings Arto Blomsten	To Winnipeg Jets 8th round pick in 1995 – Fredrik Lovén

=== Free agent signings ===
June 7, 1994	From Moncton Hawks (AHL) Dan Bylsma
June 14, 1994	From Calgary Flames Michel Petit
June 14, 1994	From Dallas Stars Rob Brown
July 7, 1994	From Adirondack Red Wings (AHL) Barry Potomski
July 8, 1994	From New York Islanders Rob Cowie
August 31, 1994	From Detroit Red Wings Troy Crowder
September 3, 1994	From Ottawa Senators Dan Quinn
September 22, 1994	From Montreal Canadiens André Racicot

=== Free agents lost ===
July 20, 1994	To Detroit Vipers (IHL) Bob Jay
September 6, 1994	To Hartford Whalers Bob Wren

=== Waivers ===
January 18, 1995	To St. Louis Blues Donald Dufresne

== Draft picks ==
Los Angeles' draft picks at the 1994 NHL entry draft held at the Hartford Civic Center in Hartford, Connecticut.

Round	Pick	Player	Nationality	College/junior/club team
1	7	Jamie Storr (G)	Canada	Owen Sound Platers (OHL)
2	33	Matt Johnson (LW)	Canada	Peterborough Petes (OHL)
3	59	Vitali Yachmenev (RW)	Russia	North Bay Centennials (OHL)
5	111	Chris Schmidt (C)	Canada	Seattle Thunderbirds (WHL)
7	163	Luc Gagne (RW)	Canada	Sudbury Wolves (OHL)
8	189	Andrew Dale (C)	Canada	Sudbury Wolves (OHL)
9	215	Jan Nemecek (D)	Czech Republic	HC České Budějovice (Czech Republic)
10	241	Sergei Shalamai (LW)	Russia	HC Irkutsk (Russia)
S	7	Quinn Fair (D)	Canada	Kent State University (NCAA)
