= 1994–95 Toronto Maple Leafs season =

NHL hockey team season

1994–95 Toronto Maple Leafs
- Division: 4th Central
- Conference: 5th Western
- 1994–95 record: 21–19–8
- Home record: 15–7–2
- Road record: 6–12–6
- Goals for: 135
- Goals against: 146

Team information
- General manager: Cliff Fletcher
- Coach: Pat Burns
- Captain: Doug Gilmour
- Alternate captains: Dave Andreychuk; Dave Ellett
- Arena: Maple Leaf Gardens
- Average attendance: 15,744
- Minor league affiliate: St. John's Maple Leafs

Team leaders
- Goals: Mats Sundin (23)
- Assists: Mike Ridley (27)
- Points: Mats Sundin (47)
- Penalty minutes: Warren Rychel (101)
- Plus/minus: Randy Wood (+7)
- Wins: Felix Potvin (15)
- Goals against average: Damian Rhodes (2.68)

The 1994–95 Toronto Maple Leafs season was Toronto's 78th season in the National Hockey League (NHL).

Prior to the 1994–95 season, franchise player and fan favourite Wendel Clark was sent to the Quebec Nordiques in a blockbuster trade. Clark, along with defenceman Sylvain Lefebvre and Toronto's second pick in the 1993 NHL entry draft, Landon Wilson, were traded to the Nordiques on June 28, 1994, in exchange for forward Mats Sundin, defenceman Garth Butcher and Quebec's first pick in the 1992 NHL entry draft, Todd Warriner. In Clark's absence, the gritty and dependable veteran forward Doug Gilmour was named team captain.

After finishing fourth in 1992–93 and third in 1993–94, the Maple Leafs fell to fifth place in the Western Conference in 1994–95 and, for the first time in three seasons, they allowed more goals than they scored. Throughout the regular season, Toronto never won more than two games in a row, and finished just two games above .500. In addition, no Toronto player recorded a hat trick. To toughen up their lineup, the Leafs signed Warren Rychel from the Los Angeles Kings midway through the regular season, and on April 7, 1995, they traded center Mike Eastwood and a third-round pick in the 1995 NHL entry draft to the Winnipeg Jets in exchange for right wing Tie Domi.

Toronto was the only Western Conference team to score at least one goal in all 48 of its regular-season games in 1994–95 (the Quebec Nordiques and the Buffalo Sabres were the only Eastern Conference teams to accomplish this feat in 1994–95). The Maple Leafs finished sixth in the league in penalty-killing (84.86%) and allowed the most empty-net goals of any team in the league (8).

The team qualified for the playoffs for the third consecutive year.

== Regular season ==
The Maple Leafs tied the Dallas Stars and the Hartford Whalers for the lowest shooting percentage during the regular season with just 135 goals on 1,520 shots (8.9%).

=== Season standings ===
Central Division
No.	CR		GP	W	L	T	GF	GA	Pts
1	1	**Detroit Red Wings**	48	33	11	4	180	117	70
2	2	**St. Louis Blues**	48	28	15	5	178	135	61
3	4	**Chicago Blackhawks**	48	24	19	5	156	115	53
4	5	**Toronto Maple Leafs**	48	21	19	8	135	146	50
5	8	**Dallas Stars**	48	17	23	8	136	135	42
6	10	Winnipeg Jets	48	16	25	7	157	177	39

Note: No. = Division rank, CR = Conference rank, W = Wins, L = Losses, T = Ties, GF = Goals For, GA = Goals Against, Pts = Points
Teams that qualified for the playoffs are highlighted in bold.

Western Conference
R		Div	GP	W	L	T	GF	GA	Pts
**1**	**p – Detroit Red Wings**	**CEN**	**48**	**33**	**11**	**4**	**180**	**117**	**70**
**2**	**x – Calgary Flames**	**PAC**	**48**	**24**	**17**	**7**	**163**	**135**	**55**
**3**	**St. Louis Blues**	**CEN**	**48**	**28**	**15**	**5**	**178**	**135**	**61**
**4**	**Chicago Blackhawks**	**CEN**	**48**	**24**	**19**	**5**	**156**	**115**	**53**
**5**	**Toronto Maple Leafs**	**CEN**	**48**	**21**	**19**	**8**	**135**	**146**	**50**
**6**	**Vancouver Canucks**	**PAC**	**48**	**18**	**18**	**12**	**153**	**148**	**48**
**7**	**San Jose Sharks**	**PAC**	**48**	**19**	**25**	**4**	**129**	**161**	**42**
**8**	**Dallas Stars**	**CEN**	**48**	**17**	**23**	**8**	**136**	**135**	**42**
9	Los Angeles Kings	PAC	48	16	23	9	142	174	41
10	Winnipeg Jets	CEN	48	16	25	7	157	177	39
11	Edmonton Oilers	PAC	48	17	27	4	136	183	38
12	Mighty Ducks of Anaheim	PAC	48	16	27	5	125	164	37

Divisions: CEN – Central, PAC – Pacific

bold – Qualified for playoffs; x – Won division; p – Won Presidents' Trophy

== Playoffs ==
Although the Maple Leafs were the underdogs against the fourth-place Chicago Blackhawks in the opening round of the 1995 Stanley Cup playoffs, they won the first two games of the series at the United Center and went home to Maple Leaf Gardens for game three with two-games-to-none series lead. However, the Blackhawks played determinedly and won Games 3 and 4 in Toronto to regain home-ice advantage in the series. Chicago then won Game 5, 4–2, and looked to clinch the series in Game 6 back in Toronto. The Maple Leafs played a spirited game, going up 4–1 in the third period. The Blackhawks fought back with three consecutive goals to tie the game. At 10:00 of the first overtime period, Randy Wood scored his second goal of the game to give the Maple Leafs a 5–4 win. The victory tied the series at three games apiece and forced game seven back in Chicago. In Game 7, Joe Murphy scored twice and Ed Belfour made 22 saves as Chicago advanced to the second round for the first time in three years with a 5–2 win.

== Schedule and results ==
=== Regular season ===
1994–95 regular season
January: 3–2–1 (home: 2–0–0; road: 1–2–1)

Game	Date	Score	Opponent	Record	Recap
1	January 20, 1995	3–3 OT	@ Los Angeles Kings (1994–95)	0–0–1	T
2	January 21, 1995	2–3	@ San Jose Sharks (1994–95)	0–1–1	L
3	January 25, 1995	6–2	Vancouver Canucks (1994–95)	1–1–1	W
4	January 27, 1995	1–4	@ Chicago Blackhawks (1994–95)	1–2–1	L
5	January 28, 1995	2–1	Calgary Flames (1994–95)	2–2–1	W
6	January 30, 1995	2–1	@ Dallas Stars (1994–95)	3–2–1	W

February: 6–7–2 (home: 5–3–1; road: 1–4–1)

Game	Date	Score	Opponent	Record	Recap
7	February 1, 1995	4–4 OT	@ Vancouver Canucks (1994–95)	3–2–2	T
8	February 3, 1995	3–5	@ Edmonton Oilers (1994–95)	3–3–2	L
9	February 4, 1995	1–4	@ Calgary Flames (1994–95)	3–4–2	L
10	February 6, 1995	7–3	San Jose Sharks (1994–95)	4–4–2	W
11	February 8, 1995	3–3 OT	Dallas Stars (1994–95)	4–4–3	T
12	February 10, 1995	2–1	@ Detroit Red Wings (1994–95)	5–4–3	W
13	February 11, 1995	2–5	Los Angeles Kings (1994–95)	5–5–3	L
14	February 13, 1995	4–2	Chicago Blackhawks (1994–95)	6–5–3	W
15	February 15, 1995	1–4	Edmonton Oilers (1994–95)	6–6–3	L
16	February 18, 1995	3–1	St. Louis Blues (1994–95)	7–6–3	W
17	February 20, 1995	2–4	Detroit Red Wings (1994–95)	7–7–3	L
18	February 22, 1995	1–4	@ Detroit Red Wings (1994–95)	7–8–3	L
19	February 23, 1995	3–1	Mighty Ducks of Anaheim (1994–95)	8–8–3	W
20	February 25, 1995	5–2	Winnipeg Jets (1994–95)	9–8–3	W
21	February 27, 1995	2–3	@ St. Louis Blues (1994–95)	9–9–3	L

March: 6–3–4 (home: 4–2–1; road: 2–1–3)

Game	Date	Score	Opponent	Record	Recap
22	March 2, 1995	3–4	San Jose Sharks (1994–95)	9–10–3	L
23	March 4, 1995	3–2	Calgary Flames (1994–95)	10–10–3	W
24	March 8, 1995	3–2	Dallas Stars (1994–95)	11–10–3	W
25	March 11, 1995	2–2 OT	Chicago Blackhawks (1994–95)	11–10–4	T
26	March 13, 1995	1–4	Los Angeles Kings (1994–95)	11–11–4	L
27	March 15, 1995	2–1	@ San Jose Sharks (1994–95)	12–11–4	W
28	March 17, 1995	3–3 OT	@ Mighty Ducks of Anaheim (1994–95)	12–11–5	T
29	March 18, 1995	5–3	@ Los Angeles Kings (1994–95)	13–11–5	W
30	March 21, 1995	1–3	@ Vancouver Canucks (1994–95)	13–12–5	L
31	March 24, 1995	3–2	Winnipeg Jets (1994–95)	14–12–5	W
32	March 25, 1995	3–3 OT	@ Winnipeg Jets (1994–95)	14–12–6	T
33	March 27, 1995	4–3	Edmonton Oilers (1994–95)	15–12–6	W
34	March 31, 1995	3–3 OT	@ Chicago Blackhawks (1994–95)	15–12–7	T

April: 5–6–1 (home: 4–2–0; road: 1–4–1)

Game	Date	Score	Opponent	Record	Recap
35	April 3, 1995	2–5	@ St. Louis Blues (1994–95)	15–13–7	L
36	April 5, 1995	4–6	St. Louis Blues (1994–95)	15–14–7	L
37	April 7, 1995	2–4	Detroit Red Wings (1994–95)	15–15–7	L
38	April 8, 1995	4–3	Winnipeg Jets (1994–95)	16–15–7	W
39	April 14, 1995	2–1	Dallas Stars (1994–95)	17–15–7	W
40	April 15, 1995	1–5	@ Winnipeg Jets (1994–95)	17–16–7	L
41	April 17, 1995	3–1	@ Chicago Blackhawks (1994–95)	18–16–7	W
42	April 19, 1995	3–2	Mighty Ducks of Anaheim (1994–95)	19–16–7	W
43	April 21, 1995	1–3	@ St. Louis Blues (1994–95)	19–17–7	L
44	April 22, 1995	4–6	@ Dallas Stars (1994–95)	19–18–7	L
45	April 26, 1995	5–2	Vancouver Canucks (1994–95)	20–18–7	W
46	April 29, 1995	2–2 OT	@ Calgary Flames (1994–95)	20–18–8	T

May: 1–1–0 (home: 0–0–0; road: 1–1–0)

Game	Date	Score	Opponent	Record	Recap
47	May 1, 1995	6–5	@ Edmonton Oilers (1994–95)	21–18–8	W
48	May 3, 1995	1–6	@ Mighty Ducks of Anaheim (1994–95)	21–19–8	L

Legend: W Win (2 points) L Loss (0 points) T Tie (1 point)

=== Playoffs ===
1995 Stanley Cup playoffs
Western Conference Quarterfinals vs. (4) Chicago Blackhawks: Blackhawks win 4–3

Game	Date	Score	Opponent	Series	Recap
1	May 7, 1995	5–3	@ Chicago Blackhawks	Maple Leafs lead 1–0	W
2	May 9, 1995	3–0	@ Chicago Blackhawks	Maple Leafs lead 2–0	W
3	May 11, 1995	2–3	Chicago Blackhawks	Maple Leafs lead 2–1	L
4	May 13, 1995	1–3	Chicago Blackhawks	Series tied 2–2	L
5	May 15, 1995	2–4	@ Chicago Blackhawks	Blackhawks lead 3–2	L
6	May 17, 1995	5–4 OT	Chicago Blackhawks	Series tied 3–3	W
7	May 19, 1995	2–5	@ Chicago Blackhawks	Blackhawks win 4–3	L

Legend: W Win L Loss

== Player statistics ==
=== Scoring ===
- Position abbreviations: C = Centre; D = Defence; G = Goaltender; LW = Left wing; RW = Right wing
- † = Joined team via a transaction (e.g., trade, waivers, signing) during the season. Stats reflect time with the Maple Leafs only.
- ‡ = Left team via a transaction (e.g., trade, waivers, release) during the season. Stats reflect time with the Maple Leafs only.

No.	Player	Pos	Regular season						Playoffs					
No.	Player	Pos	GP	G	A	Pts	+/-	PIM	GP	G	A	Pts	+/-	PIM
13	Mats Sundin	C	47	23	24	47	−5	14	7	5	4	9	−2	4
14	Dave Andreychuk	LW	48	22	16	38	−7	34	7	3	2	5	3	25
7	Mike Ridley	C	48	10	27	37	1	14	7	3	1	4	−3	2
93	Doug Gilmour	C	44	10	23	33	−5	26	7	0	6	6	2	6
23	Todd Gill	D	47	7	25	32	−8	64	7	0	3	3	−4	6
24	Randy Wood	LW	48	13	11	24	7	34	7	2	0	2	−2	6
11	Mike Gartner	RW	38	12	8	20	0	6	5	2	2	4	4	2
15	Dmitri Mironov	D	33	5	12	17	6	28	6	2	1	3	−1	2
4	Dave Ellett	D	33	5	10	15	−6	26	7	0	2	2	−5	0
9	Mike Craig	RW	37	5	5	10	−21	12	2	0	1	1	0	2
32	Mike Eastwood‡	C	36	5	5	10	−12	32	—	—	—	—	—	—
34	Jamie Macoun	D	46	2	8	10	−6	75	7	1	2	3	0	8
19	Kenny Jonsson	D	39	2	7	9	−8	16	4	0	0	0	−2	0
2	Garth Butcher	D	45	1	7	8	−5	59	7	0	0	0	0	8
21	Warren Rychel†	LW	26	1	6	7	1	101	3	0	0	0	−2	0
10	Bill Berg	LW	32	5	1	6	−11	26	7	0	1	1	−3	4
32 (Note: Hogue wore number 28 in his first two games.)	Benoit Hogue†	LW	12	3	3	6	0	0	7	0	0	0	−4	6
25	Terry Yake	RW	19	3	2	5	1	2	—	—	—	—	—	—
16	Nikolai Borschevsky‡	RW	19	0	5	5	3	0	—	—	—	—	—	—
20	Rich Sutter†	RW	18	0	3	3	−7	10	4	0	0	0	−3	2
12	Dixon Ward	RW	22	0	3	3	−4	31	—	—	—	—	—	—
25	Paul DiPietro†	C	12	1	1	2	−6	6	7	1	1	2	−3	0
55	Drake Berehowsky‡	D	25	0	2	2	−10	15	—	—	—	—	—	—
3	Grant Jennings†	D	10	0	2	2	−6	7	4	0	0	0	−3	0
28 (Note: Domi wore number 8 in his first two games.)	Tie Domi†	RW	9	0	1	1	1	31	7	1	0	1	−2	0
16 (Note: Hendrickson wore number 37 in his first six games.)	Darby Hendrickson	C	8	0	1	1	0	4	—	—	—	—	—	—
18	Kent Manderville	LW	36	0	1	1	−2	22	7	0	0	0	−3	6
22	Ken Baumgartner	LW	2	0	0	0	0	5	—	—	—	—	—	—
43	Ken Belanger	LW	3	0	0	0	0	9	—	—	—	—	—	—
28	David Harlock	D	1	0	0	0	−1	0	—	—	—	—	—	—
33	Matt Martin	D	15	0	0	0	2	13	—	—	—	—	—	—
45	Zdenek Nedved	RW	1	0	0	0	0	2	—	—	—	—	—	—
29	Felix Potvin	G	36	0	0	0		4	7	0	0	0		0
1	Damian Rhodes	G	13	0	0	0		4	—	—	—	—	—	—
8	Todd Warriner	LW	5	0	0	0	−3	0	—	—	—	—	—	—

=== Goaltending ===
No.	Player	Regular season										Playoffs								
No.	Player	GP	W	L	T	SA	GA	GAA	SV%	SO	TOI	GP	W	L	SA	GA	GAA	SV%	SO	TOI
29	Felix Potvin	36	15	13	7	1120	104	2.91	.907	0	2144	7	3	4	253	20	2.83	.921	1	424
1	Damian Rhodes	13	6	6	1	404	34	2.69	.916	0	760	—	—	—	—	—	—	—	—	—

== Awards and records ==
=== Awards ===
Type	Award/honour	Recipient	Ref
League (annual)	NHL All-Rookie Team	Kenny Jonsson (Defence)	
Team	Molson Cup	Mats Sundin	

=== Milestones ===
Milestone	Player	Date	Ref
First game	Kenny Jonsson	January 20, 1995	
First game	Zdenek Nedved	February 8, 1995	
First game	Todd Warriner	February 20, 1995	
First game	Ken Belanger	March 4, 1995	

== Transactions ==
The Maple Leafs have been involved in the following transactions during the 1994–95 season.

=== Trades ===
July 11, 1994	To Los Angeles Kings Yanic Perreault	To Toronto Maple Leafs 4th round pick in 1996 (Mikael Simons)
August 10, 1994	To Dallas Stars Peter Zezel; Grant Marshall	To Toronto Maple Leafs Compensation for Mike Craig
September 28, 1994	To Mighty Ducks of Anaheim David Sacco	To Toronto Maple Leafs Terry Yake
October 3, 1994	To Los Angeles Kings Eric Lacroix; Chris Snell; 4th round pick in 1996 (Eric Belanger)	To Toronto Maple Leafs Dixon Ward; Guy Leveque; Shayne Toporowski; Kelly Fairchild
February 10, 1995	To Washington Capitals 4th round pick in 1995 (Sebastien Charpentier)	To Toronto Maple Leafs Warren Rychel
February 17, 1995	To Detroit Red Wings Chris Govedaris	To Toronto Maple Leafs Future considerations
March 13, 1995	To Tampa Bay Lightning Cash	To Toronto Maple Leafs Rich Sutter
April 6, 1995	To Calgary Flames Nikolai Borschevsky	To Toronto Maple Leafs 6th round pick in 1996 (Chris Bogas)
April 6, 1995	To New York Islanders Eric Fichaud	To Toronto Maple Leafs Benoit Hogue; 3rd round pick in 1995 (Ryan Pepperall); 5th round pick in 1996 (Brandon Sugdon)
April 6, 1995	To Montreal Canadiens 4th round pick in 1996 (Kim Staal)	To Toronto Maple Leafs Paul DiPietro
April 7, 1995	To Detroit Red Wings Future considerations	To Toronto Maple Leafs Gord Kruppke
April 7, 1995	To Pittsburgh Penguins Drake Berehowsky	To Toronto Maple Leafs Grant Jennings
April 7, 1995	To Winnipeg Jets Mike Eastwood; 3rd round pick in 1995 (Brad Isbister)	To Toronto Maple Leafs Tie Domi
July 8, 1995	To Pittsburgh Penguins Dmitri Mironov; 2nd round pick in 1996 (Josh DeWolf)	To Toronto Maple Leafs Larry Murphy
July 8, 1995	To Philadelphia Flyers 5th round pick in 1996 (Per-Ragnar Bergquist)	To Toronto Maple Leafs Rob Zettler
July 8, 1995	To Vancouver Canucks Mike Ridley	To Toronto Maple Leafs Sergio Momesso

=== Waivers ===
January 18, 1995	From Buffalo Sabres Randy Wood

=== Free agents ===
Player	Former team
Mike Craig	Dallas Stars
Jamie Heward	Undrafted free agent

Player	New team
Mike Krushelnyski	Detroit Red Wings
John Cullen	Pittsburgh Penguins
Mark Greig	Calgary Flames

== Draft picks ==
Toronto's draft picks at the 1994 NHL entry draft held at the Hartford Civic Center in Hartford, Connecticut.

Round	Pick	Player	Nationality	College/junior/club team
1	16	Eric Fichaud (G)	Canada	Chicoutimi Saguenéens (QMJHL)
2	48	Sean Haggerty (LW)	United States	Detroit Junior Red Wings (OHL)
3	64	Fredrik Modin (LW)	Sweden	Timrå IK (Sweden)
5	126	Mark Deyell (C)	Canada	Saskatoon Blades (WHL)
6	152	Kam White (D)	United States	Newmarket Royals (OHL)
7	178	Tommi Rajamaki (D)	Finland	Ässät (Finland)
8	204	Rob Butler (LW)	Canada	Niagara Falls Canucks (GHJHL)
10	256	Sergei Berezin (LW)	Russia	Khimik Voskresensk (Russia)
11	282	Doug Nolan (LW)	United States	Catholic Memorial High School (USHS–MA)

== Farm teams ==
- The Maple Leafs farm team was the St. John's Maple Leafs in St. John's, Newfoundland.
