= 1994–95 Edmonton Oilers season =

NHL team season

1994–95 Edmonton Oilers
- Division: 5th Pacific
- Conference: 11th Western
- 1994–95 record: 17–27–4
- Home record: 11–12–1
- Road record: 6–15–3
- Goals for: 136
- Goals against: 183

Team information
- General manager: Glen Sather
- Coach: George Burnett (Jan.–Apr.); Ron Low (Apr.–May)
- Captain: Shayne Corson (Jan.–Apr.); Vacant (Apr.–May)
- Alternate captains: Kelly Buchberger; Luke Richardson
- Arena: Northlands Coliseum
- Average attendance: 13,123 (76.7%)
- Minor league affiliates: Cape Breton Oilers (AHL); Wheeling Thunderbirds (ECHL)

Team leaders
- Goals: David Oliver (16)
- Assists: Doug Weight (33)
- Points: Doug Weight (40)
- Penalty minutes: Bryan Marchment (184)
- Plus/minus: Dean Kennedy (+2)
- Wins: Bill Ranford (15)
- Goals against average: Bill Ranford (3.62)

The 1994–95 Edmonton Oilers season was the Oilers' 16th season in the NHL, and they were coming off a tough 1993–94 season, when they finished the year 25–45–14, failing to qualify for the playoffs for the 2nd straight season.

The 1994–95 season was nearly cancelled due to a lockout, however, on January 11, 1995, an agreement was made between the NHL owners and the players, and a shortened 48 game schedule was used for the season.

The Oilers named George Burnett as head coach of the club, as Burnett coached the Oilers AHL affiliate, the Cape Breton Oilers for the previous 2 seasons, including leading the team to the Calder Cup in 1993. Edmonton got off to a solid start, and 27 games into the season, the Oilers sat in 2nd place in the Pacific Division with 26 points, only 3 behind the division leading Calgary Flames. The Oilers then went on a 10-game winless streak, costing Burnett his job, as former Oilers goaltender Ron Low replaced him. It was too little too late, as Edmonton would finish the season 17–27–4, earning 38 points, and missed the playoffs for the 3rd straight season for the first time in franchise history.

Offensively, Doug Weight led the team with 40 points, while David Oliver was the Oilers goal scoring leader with 16. Jason Arnott had another solid season, scoring 15 goals and earning 37 points. Defenseman Igor Kravchuk led the blueline with 18 points in 36 games, while Bryan Marchment had a club high 184 penalty minutes.

In goal, Bill Ranford played in 40 games, winning 15 of them, with a 3.62 GAA and 2 shutouts along the way. However, the Oilers allowed a league-high 183 goals and Oilers goaltenders combined for a league-low .877 save percentage.

The Oilers had the most power-play opportunities during the regular season, with 259. They also allowed the most power-play goals, with 52.

== Regular season ==
=== Season standings ===
Pacific Division
No.	CR		GP	W	L	T	GF	GA	Pts
1	2	**Calgary Flames**	48	24	17	7	163	135	55
2	6	**Vancouver Canucks**	48	18	18	12	153	148	48
3	7	**San Jose Sharks**	48	19	25	4	129	161	42
4	9	Los Angeles Kings	48	16	23	9	142	174	41
5	11	Edmonton Oilers	48	17	27	4	136	183	38
6	12	Mighty Ducks of Anaheim	48	16	27	5	125	164	37

Note: No. = Division rank, CR = Conference rank, W = Wins, L = Losses, T = Ties, GF = Goals For, GA = Goals Against, Pts = Points
Teams that qualified for the playoffs are highlighted in bold.

Western Conference
R		Div	GP	W	L	T	GF	GA	Pts
**1**	**p – Detroit Red Wings**	**CEN**	**48**	**33**	**11**	**4**	**180**	**117**	**70**
**2**	**x – Calgary Flames**	**PAC**	**48**	**24**	**17**	**7**	**163**	**135**	**55**
**3**	**St. Louis Blues**	**CEN**	**48**	**28**	**15**	**5**	**178**	**135**	**61**
**4**	**Chicago Blackhawks**	**CEN**	**48**	**24**	**19**	**5**	**156**	**115**	**53**
**5**	**Toronto Maple Leafs**	**CEN**	**48**	**21**	**19**	**8**	**135**	**146**	**50**
**6**	**Vancouver Canucks**	**PAC**	**48**	**18**	**18**	**12**	**153**	**148**	**48**
**7**	**San Jose Sharks**	**PAC**	**48**	**19**	**25**	**4**	**129**	**161**	**42**
**8**	**Dallas Stars**	**CEN**	**48**	**17**	**23**	**8**	**136**	**135**	**42**
9	Los Angeles Kings	PAC	48	16	23	9	142	174	41
10	Winnipeg Jets	CEN	48	16	25	7	157	177	39
11	Edmonton Oilers	PAC	48	17	27	4	136	183	38
12	Mighty Ducks of Anaheim	PAC	48	16	27	5	125	164	37

Divisions: CEN – Central, PAC – Pacific

bold – Qualified for playoffs; x – Won division; p – Won Presidents' Trophy

== Schedule and results ==
1994–95 regular season
January: 2–4–0 (home: 1–1–0; road: 1–3–0)

Game	Date	Visitor	Score	Home	OT	Decision	Attendance	Record	Pts	Recap
1	January 20	Mighty Ducks of Anaheim	1 – 2	Edmonton Oilers		Ranford	14,967	1–0–0	2	W
2	January 22	Edmonton Oilers	4 – 3	Los Angeles Kings		Ranford	13,160	2–0–0	4	W
3	January 23	Edmonton Oilers	4 – 5	Mighty Ducks of Anaheim	OT	Ranford	17,174	2–1–0	4	L
4	January 25	Edmonton Oilers	1 – 5	Chicago Blackhawks		Ranford	20,536	2–2–0	4	L
5	January 28	Edmonton Oilers	2 – 5	Detroit Red Wings		Brathwaite		2–3–0	4	L
6	January 30	Detroit Red Wings	4 – 2	Edmonton Oilers		Ranford	12,120	2–4–0	4	L

February: 5–6–2 (home: 4–2–1; road: 1–4–1)

Game	Date	Visitor	Score	Home	OT	Decision	Attendance	Record	Pts	Recap
7	February 1	Chicago Blackhawks	7 – 0	Edmonton Oilers		Ranford	10,492	2–5–0	4	L
8	February 3	Toronto Maple Leafs	3 – 5	Edmonton Oilers		Brathwaite	14,307	3–5–0	6	W
9	February 7	Edmonton Oilers	4 – 4	Vancouver Canucks	OT	Ranford	12,347	3–5–1	7	T
10	February 8	Winnipeg Jets	3 – 3	Edmonton Oilers	OT	Ranford	10,308	3–5–2	8	T
11	February 10	San Jose Sharks	1 – 5	Edmonton Oilers		Ranford	11,555	4–5–2	10	W
12	February 12	Mighty Ducks of Anaheim	0 – 2	Edmonton Oilers		Ranford	12,487	5–5–2	12	W
13	February 15	Edmonton Oilers	4 – 1	Toronto Maple Leafs		Ranford	15,746	6–5–2	14	W
14	February 17	Edmonton Oilers	2 – 4	Detroit Red Wings		Ranford	19,875	6–6–2	14	L
15	February 19	Edmonton Oilers	1 – 4	Chicago Blackhawks		Brathwaite	20,536	6–7–2	14	L
16	February 20	Edmonton Oilers	0 – 4	St. Louis Blues		Ranford	17,119	6–8–2	14	L
17	February 22	Dallas Stars	1 – 2	Edmonton Oilers		Ranford	10,242	7–8–2	16	W
18	February 25	Los Angeles Kings	4 – 3	Edmonton Oilers		Ranford	16,945	7–9–2	16	L
19	February 28	Edmonton Oilers	2 – 5	Calgary Flames		Brathwaite	19,127	7–10–2	16	L

March: 5–7–1 (home: 4–4–0; road: 1–3–1)

Game	Date	Visitor	Score	Home	OT	Decision	Attendance	Record	Pts	Recap
20	March 1	Dallas Stars	5 – 3	Edmonton Oilers		Ranford	9,502	7–11–2	16	L
21	March 3	Chicago Blackhawks	5 – 2	Edmonton Oilers		Ranford	12,248	7–12–2	16	L
22	March 5	Detroit Red Wings	2 – 4	Edmonton Oilers		Ranford	12,780	8–12–2	18	W
23	March 8	Edmonton Oilers	5 – 2	San Jose Sharks		Ranford	17,190	9–12–2	20	W
24	March 12	Vancouver Canucks	5 – 2	Edmonton Oilers		Ranford	12,768	9–13–2	20	L
25	March 14	St. Louis Blues	5 – 6	Edmonton Oilers		Ranford	10,707	10–13–2	22	W
26	March 17	San Jose Sharks	3 – 5	Edmonton Oilers		Ranford	12,369	11–13–2	24	W
27	March 20	Calgary Flames	2 – 5	Edmonton Oilers		Ranford	14,060	12–13–2	26	W
28	March 22	Edmonton Oilers	4 – 4	Dallas Stars	OT	Brathwaite	16,494	12–13–3	27	T
29	March 23	Edmonton Oilers	1 – 2	Dallas Stars		Ranford	16,924	12–14–3	27	L
30	March 26	Edmonton Oilers	1 – 5	St. Louis Blues		Ranford	20,185	12–15–3	27	L
31	March 27	Edmonton Oilers	3 – 4	Toronto Maple Leafs		Brathwaite	15,746	12–16–3	27	L
32	March 31	Calgary Flames	6 – 2	Edmonton Oilers		Ranford	17,013	12–17–3	27	L

April: 5–8–1 (home: 2–4–0; road: 3–4–1)

Game	Date	Visitor	Score	Home	OT	Decision	Attendance	Record	Pts	Recap
33	April 1	Vancouver Canucks	5 – 1	Edmonton Oilers		Ranford	14,465	12–18–3	27	L
34	April 3	Edmonton Oilers	2 – 7	Los Angeles Kings		Ranford	16,008	12–19–3	27	L
35	April 5	Edmonton Oilers	3 – 4	Mighty Ducks of Anaheim	OT	Ranford	17,174	12–20–3	27	L
36	April 7	Edmonton Oilers	0 – 5	San Jose Sharks		Ranford	17,190	12–21–3	27	L
37	April 9	San Jose Sharks	5 – 2	Edmonton Oilers		Ranford	12,185	12–22–3	27	L
38	April 13	Edmonton Oilers	6 – 4	Vancouver Canucks		Brathwaite	13,290	13–22–3	29	W
39	April 15	Calgary Flames	4 – 2	Edmonton Oilers		Ranford	16,121	13–23–3	29	L
40	April 17	Edmonton Oilers	6 – 5	Winnipeg Jets		Ranford	14,501	14–23–3	31	W
41	April 19	Los Angeles Kings	0 – 2	Edmonton Oilers		Ranford	15,403	15–23–3	33	W
42	April 21	Edmonton Oilers	3 – 3	Los Angeles Kings	OT	Ranford	15,624	15–23–4	34	T
43	April 22	Edmonton Oilers	1 – 6	Vancouver Canucks		Ranford	14,275	15–24–4	34	L
44	April 25	Edmonton Oilers	5 – 3	Winnipeg Jets		Ranford	12,994	16–24–4	36	W
45	April 27	St. Louis Blues	2 – 3	Edmonton Oilers	OT	Ranford	12,655	17–24–4	38	W
46	April 29	Winnipeg Jets	5 – 1	Edmonton Oilers		Brathwaite	15,219	17–25–4	38	L

May: 0–2–0 (home: 0–1–0; road: 0–1–0)

Game	Date	Visitor	Score	Home	OT	Decision	Attendance	Record	Pts	Recap
47	May 1	Toronto Maple Leafs	6 – 5	Edmonton Oilers		Gage	14,044	17–26–4	38	L
48	May 3	Edmonton Oilers	3 – 5	Calgary Flames		Gage	18,851	17–27–4	38	L

Legend: W Win (2 points) L Loss (0 points) T Tie (1 point)

== Player statistics ==
=== Scoring ===
- Position abbreviations: C = Centre; D = Defence; G = Goaltender; LW = Left wing; RW = Right wing
- † = Joined team via a transaction (e.g., trade, waivers, signing) during the season. Stats reflect time with the Oilers only.
- ‡ = Left team via a transaction (e.g., trade, waivers, release) during the season. Stats reflect time with the Oilers only.

No.	Player	Pos	Regular season					
No.	Player	Pos	GP	G	A	Pts	+/-	PIM
39	Doug Weight	C	48	7	33	40	−17	69
7	Jason Arnott	C	42	15	22	37	−14	128
9	Shayne Corson	LW	48	12	24	36	−17	86
20	David Oliver	RW	44	16	14	30	−11	20
26	Todd Marchant	C	45	13	14	27	−3	32
16	Kelly Buchberger	RW	48	7	17	24	0	82
17	Scott Thornton	LW	47	10	12	22	−4	89
21	Igor Kravchuk	D	36	7	11	18	−15	29
25	Mike Stapleton	RW	46	6	11	17	−12	21
28	Roman Oksiuta‡	RW	26	11	2	13	−14	8
22	Luke Richardson	D	46	3	10	13	−6	40
18	Kirk Maltby	RW	47	8	3	11	−11	49
32	Dean Kennedy	D	40	2	8	10	2	25
15	Fredrik Olausson	D	33	0	10	10	−4	20
2	Boris Mironov	D	29	1	7	8	−9	40
27	Peter White	C	9	2	4	6	1	0
24	Bryan Marchment	D	40	1	5	6	−11	184
28	Jiri Slegr†	D	12	1	5	6	−5	14
34	Len Esau‡	D	14	0	6	6	−8	15
33	Scott Pearson‡	RW	28	1	4	5	−11	54
6 (Note: Sutton wore number 40 in his first game.)	Ken Sutton†	D	12	3	1	4	−1	12
8	Zdeno Ciger	LW	5	2	2	4	−1	0
38	Iain Fraser†	C	9	3	0	3	3	0
29	Louie DeBrusk	LW	34	2	0	2	−4	93
6	Gord Mark	D	18	0	2	2	−9	35
30	Bill Ranford	G	40	0	2	2		2
23	Jason Bonsignore	C	1	1	0	1	−1	0
14	Kent Nilsson†	C	6	1	0	1	−5	0
19	Tyler Wright	C	6	1	0	1	1	14
12	Micah Aivazoff	LW	21	0	1	1	−2	2
1	Joaquin Gage	G	2	0	1	1		0
36	Ralph Intranuovo	C	1	0	1	1	1	0
43	Dennis Bonvie	D	2	0	0	0	0	0
31	Fred Brathwaite	G	14	0	0	0		0
37	Dean McAmmond	LW	6	0	0	0	−1	0
34	Ryan McGill†	D	8	0	0	0	−4	8
10	Ryan Smyth	LW	3	0	0	0	−1	0
33	Marko Tuomainen	RW	4	0	0	0	0	0

=== Goaltending ===
No.	Player	Regular season									
No.	Player	GP	W	L	T	SA	GA	GAA	SV%	SO	TOI
30	Bill Ranford	40	15	20	3	1134	133	3.62	.883	2	2203
31	Fred Brathwaite	14	2	5	1	292	40	4.00	.863	0	601
1	Joaquin Gage	2	0	2	0	40	7	4.25	.825	0	99

== Awards and records ==
=== Awards ===
Type	Award/honour	Recipient	Ref
Team	Community Service Award	Bill Ranford	
Team	Defenceman of the Year	Luke Richardson	
Team	Molson Cup	Bill Ranford	
Team	Most Popular Player	Kirk Maltby	
Team	Top Defensive Forward	Kelly Buchberger	
Team	Top First Year Oiler	Todd Marchant	
Team	Unsung Hero	David Oliver	
Team	Zane Feldman Trophy	Jason Arnott	

=== Milestones ===
Regular Season
Player	Milestone	Reached
David Oliver	1st NHL Game; 1st NHL Goal; 1st NHL Assist; 1st NHL Point	January 20, 1995
Igor Kravchuk	100th NHL Game	January 22, 1995
Ryan Smyth	1st NHL Game	January 22, 1995
Todd Marchant	1st NHL Goal	January 28, 1995
Dean Kennedy	1,100th NHL PIM	January 30, 1995
Shayne Corson	400th NHL Point	February 19, 1995
Bryan Marchment	800th NHL PIM	February 19, 1995
Mike Stapleton	300th NHL Game	February 22, 1995
Jason Arnott	200th NHL PIM	February 25, 1995
Scott Thornton	200th NHL PIM	February 25, 1995
Scott Pearson	500th NHL PIM	February 25, 1995
Dean Kennedy	700th NHL Game	March 8, 1995
Jason Arnott	100th NHL Game	March 12, 1995
Jason Arnott	1st NHL Hat-trick	March 20, 1995
David Oliver	1st NHL Hat-trick	March 22, 1995
Luke Richardson	100th NHL Point	March 22, 1995
Boris Mironov	100th NHL Game	March 23, 1995
Bryan Marchment	900th NHL PIM	March 26, 1995
Ralph Intranuovo	1st NHL Game; 1st NHL Assist; 1st NHL Point	March 27, 1995
Kirk Maltby	100th NHL Game; 100th NHL PIM	April 1, 1995
Kelly Buchberger	1,200th NHL PIM	April 3, 1995
Shayne Corson	600th NHL Game	April 7, 1995
Marko Tuomainen	1st NHL Game	April 19, 1995
Louie DeBrusk	600th NHL PIM	April 15, 1995
Jason Arnott	100th NHL Point	April 17, 1995
Dennis Bonvie	1st NHL Game	April 19, 1995
Bill Ranford	10th NHL Shutout	April 19, 1995
Doug Weight	200th NHL PIM	April 21, 1995
Shayne Corson	1,300th NHL PIM	April 22, 1995
Joaquin Gage	1st NHL Game; 1st NHL Assist; 1st NHL Point	May 1, 1995
Jason Bonsignore	1st NHL Game; 1st NHL Goal; 1st NHL Point	May 3, 1995

== Transactions ==
=== Trades ===
March 13, 1995	To Philadelphia Flyers Brad Zavisha; 6th round pick in 1995	To Edmonton Oilers Ryan McGill
April 7, 1995	To Buffalo Sabres Scott Pearson	To Edmonton Oilers Ken Sutton
April 7, 1995	To Vancouver Canucks Roman Oksiuta	To Edmonton Oilers Jiri Slegr

=== Players acquired ===
Date	Player	Former team
August 25, 1994	Dennis Bonvie	Cape Breton Oilers (AHL)
January 26, 1995	Kent Nilsson	Vålerenga Ishockey (Eliteserien)

=== Players lost ===
Date	Player	New team
May 27, 1994	Jeff Chychrun	Hartford Whalers
July 7, 1994	Brent Grieve	Chicago Blackhawks
July 27, 1994	Shjon Podein	Philadelphia Flyers
August 18, 1994	Steven Rice	Hartford Whalers
August 29, 1994	Bob Beers	New York Islanders
September 18, 1994	Ilya Byakin	San Jose Sharks
November 17, 1994	Tim Tisdale	Fredericton Canadiens (AHL)

=== Waivers ===
Date	Player	Team
January 18, 1995	Micah Aivazoff	from Pittsburgh Penguins
January 18, 1995	Len Esau	from Calgary Flames
January 18, 1995	Dean Kennedy	from Winnipeg Jets
March 3, 1995	Iain Fraser	from Dallas Stars
March 7, 1995	Len Esau	to Calgary Flames

== Draft picks ==
Edmonton's draft picks at the 1994 NHL entry draft held at the Hartford Civic Center in Hartford, Connecticut.

Round	#	Player	Nationality	College/Junior/Club team (League)
1	4	Jason Bonsignore	United States	Niagara Falls Thunder (OHL)
1	6	Ryan Smyth	Canada	Moose Jaw Warriors (WHL)
2	32	Mike Watt	Canada	Stratford Cullitons (MOJHL)
3	53	Corey Neilson	Canada	North Bay Centennials (OHL)
3	60	Brad Symes	Canada	Portland Winter Hawks (WHL)
4	79	Adam Copeland	Canada	Burlington Cougars (OPJHL)
4	95	Jussi Tarvainen	Finland	KalPa (Finland)
5	110	Jon Gaskins	United States	Dubuque Fighting Saints (USHL)
6	136	Terry Marchant	United States	Niagara Scenics (NAJHL)
7	160	Curtis Sheptak	Canada	Olds Grizzlys (AJHL)
7	162	Dmitri Sulga	Belarus	Tivali Minsk (Russia)
7	179	Chris Wickenheiser	Canada	Red Deer Rebels (WHL)
8	185	Rob Guinn	Canada	Newmarket Royals (OHL)
8	188	Jason Reid	Canada	St. Andrew's College (High school)
9	214	Jeremy Jablonski	Canada	Victoria Cougars (WHL)
11	266	Ladislav Benýšek	Czech Republic	Sigma Olomouc (Czech Republic)
S	6	Chad Dameworth	United States	Northern Michigan University (CCHA)
