= Shayne Toporowski =

Canadian ice hockey player and coach

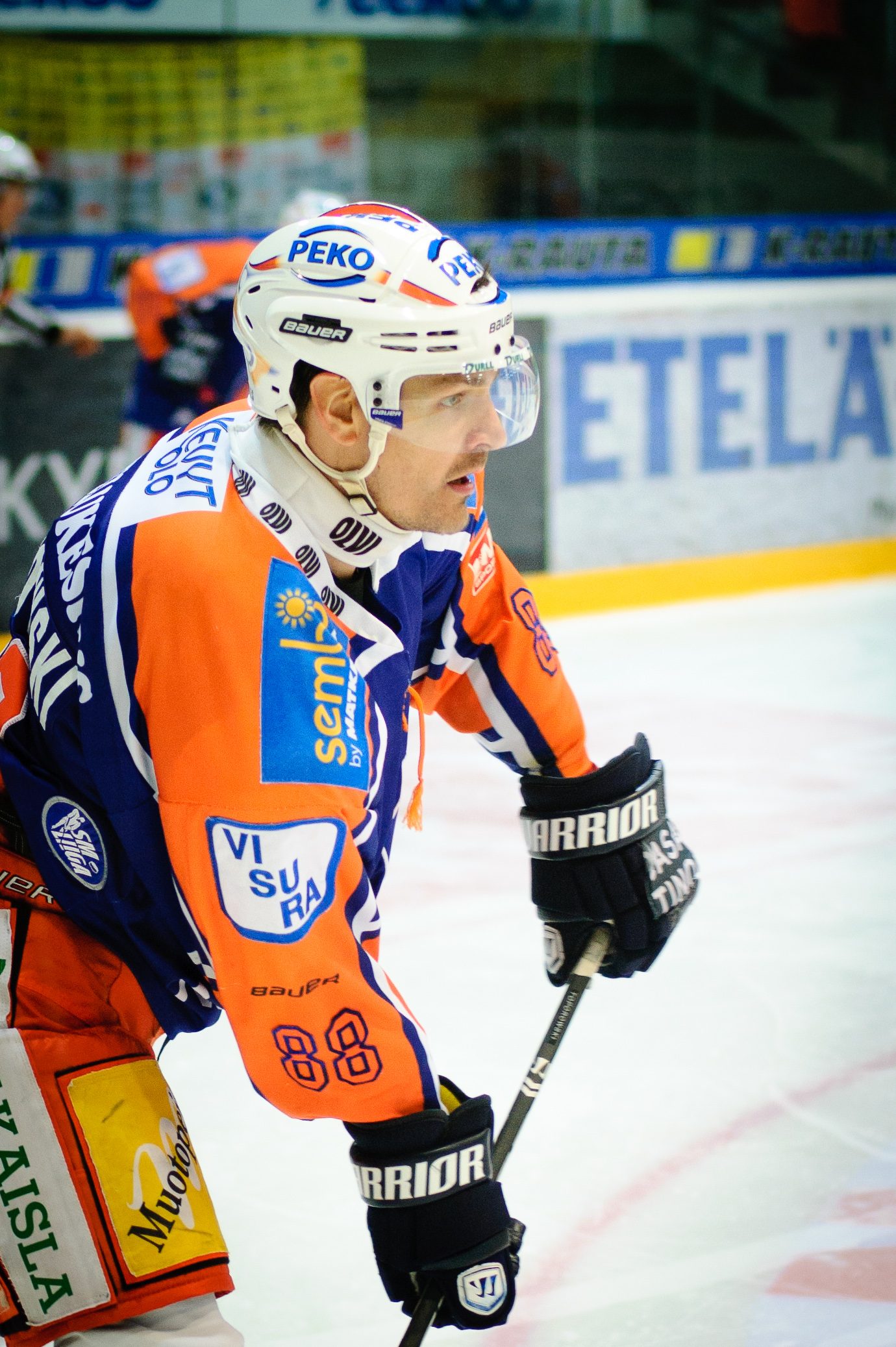
- Born: August 6, 1975 (age 50) Paddockwood, Saskatchewan, Canada
- Height: 6 ft 2 in (188 cm)
- Weight: 216 lb (98 kg; 15 st 6 lb)
- Position: Right wing
- Shot: Right
- Played for: Toronto Maple Leafs; Espoo Blues; Lahti Pelicans; Ilves Tampere; Lukko Rauma; Saimaan Pallo; Tappara Tampere; Belfast Giants; Amur Khabarovsk; Luleå HF; ERC Ingolstadt; EC VSV
- NHL draft: 42nd overall, 1993; Los Angeles Kings
- Playing career: 1995–2013

Shayne Angelo Toporowski (born August 6, 1975) is a Canadian former professional ice hockey right winger and college coach, and current Hockey Coach of the Quad Cities Storm. He was drafted into the National Hockey League (NHL) in the second round, 42nd overall, by the Los Angeles Kings in the 1993 draft. He played 3 games in the NHL with the Toronto Maple Leafs during the 1996–97 season, with the rest of his career spent in Europe.

== Playing career ==
Toporowski was born in Paddockwood, Saskatchewan. After being drafted, Toporowski continued to play junior hockey for the Prince Albert Raiders of the Western Hockey League (WHL). In October 1994, the Kings traded him, Guy Leveque, Dixon Ward, and Kelly Fairchild to the Toronto Maple Leafs in exchange for Eric Lacroix, Chris Snell, and a fourth-round pick in the 1996 draft. The following two seasons, Toporowski played for the Maple Leafs' minor league affiliate, the St. John's Maple Leafs of the American Hockey League (AHL). In the 1996–97 season, Toronto called him up for three NHL games.

The following off-season, he signed a two-year contract with the St. Louis Blues and played for their AHL affiliate, the Worcester IceCats. The year following, he signed a one-year contract with the Phoenix Coyotes and played for their AHL affiliate, the Springfield Falcons.

From 2000 to 2012, he played in various European leagues. He then played his last season of professional hockey with the Quad City Mallards of the Central Hockey League (CHL).

== Post-playing career ==
After retiring, Toporowski served as an assistant coach of the Division I Holy Cross Crusaders in the Atlantic Hockey Association for the 2013–14 season. In 2014 he became head coach of the Division III Worcester State Lancers of the Massachusetts State Collegiate Athletic Conference.

On May 30, 2024, it was announced that we would be the Head Coach for the Quad City Storm.

== Career statistics ==
=== Regular season and playoffs ===
			Regular season					Playoffs
Season	Team	League	GP	G	A	Pts	PIM	GP	G	A	Pts	PIM
1990–91	Prince Albert Midget Mintos	SMAAAHL	30	19	13	32	91	—	—	—	—	—
1991–92	Prince Albert Midget Mintos	SMAAAHL	27	23	29	52	91	—	—	—	—	—
1991–92	Prince Albert Raiders	WHL	6	2	0	2	2	7	2	1	3	6
1992–93	Prince Albert Raiders	WHL	72	25	32	57	235	—	—	—	—	—
1993–94	Prince Albert Raiders	WHL	68	37	45	82	183	—	—	—	—	—
1994–95	Prince Albert Raiders	WHL	72	36	38	74	151	15	10	8	18	25
1995–96	St. John's Maple Leafs	AHL	72	11	26	37	216	4	1	1	2	4
1996–97	St. John's Maple Leafs	AHL	72	20	17	37	210	11	3	2	5	16
1996–97	Toronto Maple Leafs	NHL	3	0	0	0	7	—	—	—	—	—
1997–98	Worcester IceCats	AHL	73	9	21	30	128	11	5	3	8	44
1998–99	Worcester IceCats	AHL	75	18	29	47	124	4	1	0	1	6
1999–00	Springfield Falcons	AHL	80	27	28	55	191	5	0	1	1	10
2000–01	Belfast Giants	BISL	4	2	1	3	6	—	—	—	—	—
2000–01	Espoo Blues	FIN	29	14	11	25	106	—	—	—	—	—
2001–02	Amur Khabarovsk	RSL	3	0	0	0	2	—	—	—	—	—
2001–02	Luleå HF	SEL	30	14	11	25	71	6	3	0	3	18
2002–03	ERC Ingolstadt	DEL	50	11	16	27	142	—	—	—	—	—
2003–04	Lahti Pelicans	FIN	27	3	6	9	30	—	—	—	—	—
2003–04	Ilves Tampere	FIN	21	2	12	14	89	6	3	1	4	0
2004–05	Lukko Rauma	FIN	54	17	18	35	131	8	2	1	3	57
2005–06	Lukko Rauma	FIN	53	12	17	29	135	—	—	—	—	—
2006–07	Lukko Rauma	FIN	55	19	34	53	86	3	2	0	2	26
2007–08	Lukko Rauma	FIN	54	12	22	34	97	3	1	2	3	0
2008–09	Saimaan Pallo	FIN	56	18	28	46	107	3	3	2	5	0
2009–10	Saimaan Pallo	FIN	57	22	20	42	111	—	—	—	—	—
2010–11	Tappara Tampere	FIN	58	16	17	33	46	—	—	—	—	—
2011–12	EC VSV	EBEL	32	8	8	16	88	—	—	—	—	—
2012–13	Quad City Mallards	CHL	61	11	21	32	87	5	1	1	2	10
FIN totals			464	135	185	320	938	23	11	6	17	83
NHL totals			3	0	0	0	7	— !—	—	—	—
