= Kelly Fairchild =

American ice hockey player (born 1973)

- Born: April 9, 1973 (age 53) Hibbing, Minnesota, U.S.
- Height: 5 ft 11 in (180 cm)
- Weight: 197 lb (89 kg; 14 st 1 lb)
- Position: Center
- Shot: Left
- Played for: Toronto Maple Leafs; Dallas Stars; Colorado Avalanche; Eisbären Berlin; Vienna Capitals; Nippon Paper Cranes
- National team: United States
- NHL draft: 152nd overall, 1991; Los Angeles Kings
- Playing career: 1994–2009

Kelly G. Fairchild (born April 9, 1973) is an American former professional ice hockey player. He played in the NHL with the Toronto Maple Leafs, Dallas Stars and the Colorado Avalanche between 1996 and 2002. The rest of his career, which lasted from 1994 to 2009, was spent in various minor leagues, as well as time in Europe and Asia.

== Playing career ==
Fairchild was selected in the 1991 NHL entry draft by the Los Angeles Kings in the 7th round, 152nd overall. He attended Grand Rapids High School and was a standout play-maker before committing to a collegiate career with the University of Wisconsin in 1991. In 1993–94, his junior year with the Badgers, Kelly led the Western Collegiate Hockey Association in scoring with 64 points and was named to the WCHA's First All-Star Team and finished as a runner up in the Hobey Baker Award.

Prior to his first professional season, Fairchild was traded by the Kings, along with Dixon Ward, Guy Leveque and Shayne Toporowski, to the Toronto Maple Leafs for Eric Lacroix, Chris Snell and fourth round pick (Eric Belanger) on October 3, 1994. After two seasons with the Maple Leafs AHL affiliate, St. John's he made his NHL debut appearing in a single game and recording an assist in the 1995–96 season. Over the next couple of seasons, Kelly played in 22 further games with the Maple Leafs, but ultimately assigned to minor league affiliates.

On July 2, 1998, Fairchild signed a two-year contract with the Dallas Stars. Despite contributing largely to the offense of the Michigan K-Wings, he was only able to make a lone Star appearance in 1998–99. Looked upon as an established minor-league veteran, Fairchild was then signed by the Colorado Avalanche in 2000. Fairchild was assigned to AHL affiliate, the Hershey Bears, for the most part of two seasons but played in 10 Avalanche games and scoring his first 2, and only, goals in the 2001–02 season.

After totaling just 34 NHL games, Kelly left North America when he signed with Eisbären Berlin of the German DEL in 2002. After a prolific first season in the DEL with Berlin, Fairchild was unexpectedly chosen to the United States team to participate in the 2003 World Championships in Finland. As an understrength team, Fairchild scored in the upset loss to Denmark. Fairchild finished with 5 goals in 6 games as Team USA finished a disappointing 13th out of 16 teams. Fairchild was then a part of two championships with Berlin in 2005 and 2006 before leaving in 2007 to join the Vienna Capitals in the Austrian Hockey League.

In his last season of professional hockey, Fairchild won the Asia League Ice Hockey Championship with the Nippon Paper Cranes in 2009.

== Career statistics ==
=== Regular season and playoffs ===
			Regular season					Playoffs
Season	Team	League	GP	G	A	Pts	PIM	GP	G	A	Pts	PIM
1988–89	Hibbing/Chisholm High School	HS-MN	22	9	8	17	24	—	—	—	—	—
1989–90	Grand Rapids High School	HS-MN	28	12	17	29	73	—	—	—	—	—
1990–91	Grand Rapids High School	HS-MN	28	28	45	73	25	—	—	—	—	—
1991–92	University of Wisconsin	WCHA	41	11	10	21	45	—	—	—	—	—
1992–93	University of Wisconsin	WCHA	42	25	29	54	54	—	—	—	—	—
1993–94	University of Wisconsin	WCHA	42	20	44	64	81	—	—	—	—	—
1994–95	St. John's Maple Leafs	AHL	53	27	23	50	51	4	0	2	2	4
1995–96	St. John's Maple Leafs	AHL	78	29	49	78	85	2	0	1	1	4
1995–96	Toronto Maple Leafs	NHL	1	0	1	1	2	—	—	—	—	—
1996–97	St. John's Maple Leafs	AHL	29	9	22	31	36	—	—	—	—	—
1996–97	Toronto Maple Leafs	NHL	22	0	2	2	2	—	—	—	—	—
1996–97	Orlando Solar Bears	IHL	25	9	6	15	20	9	6	5	11	16
1997–98	Orlando Solar Bears	IHL	22	2	6	8	20	—	—	—	—	—
1997–98	Milwaukee Admirals	IHL	40	20	24	44	32	10	5	2	7	4
1997–98	St. John's Maple Leafs	AHL	17	5	2	7	24	—	—	—	—	—
1998–99	Dallas Stars	NHL	1	0	0	0	0	—	—	—	—	—
1998–99	Michigan K-Wings	IHL	74	17	33	50	88	5	2	2	4	16
1999–00	Michigan K-Wings	IHL	78	21	41	62	89	—	—	—	—	—
2000–01	Hershey Bears	AHL	70	23	40	63	68	12	2	9	11	10
2001–02	Hershey Bears	AHL	63	22	25	47	92	8	2	1	3	6
2001–02	Colorado Avalanche	NHL	10	2	0	2	2	—	—	—	—	—
2002–03	Eisbären Berlin	DEL	51	20	32	52	74	9	3	3	6	20
2003–04	Eisbären Berlin	DEL	42	20	23	43	86	11	6	7	13	6
2004–05	Eisbären Berlin	DEL	43	17	16	33	54	7	1	5	6	4
2005–06	Eisbären Berlin	DEL	33	15	17	32	22	11	3	5	8	12
2006–07	Eisbären Berlin	DEL	47	13	15	28	60	3	0	0	0	6
2007–08	Vienna Capitals	EBEL	44	7	29	36	58	7	1	3	4	12
2008–09	Nippon Paper Cranes	AL	20	9	14	23	52	—	—	—	—	—
AHL totals			310	112	164	276	356	26	4	13	17	24
NHL totals			34	2	3	5	6	—	—	—	—	—

=== International ===
Year	Team	Event	GP	G	A	Pts	PIM
2003	United States	WC	6	5	0	5	2
Senior totals			6	5	0	5	2

== Awards and honors ==
Award	Year
All-WCHA First Team	1993–94
