= 1994–95 Vancouver Canucks season =

25th season in franchise history

1994–95 Vancouver Canucks
- Division: 2nd Pacific
- Conference: 6th Western
- 1994–95 record: 18–18–12
- Home record: 10–8–6
- Road record: 8–10–6
- Goals for: 153
- Goals against: 148

Team information
- General manager: Pat Quinn
- Coach: Rick Ley
- Captain: Trevor Linden
- Alternate captains: Sergio Momesso; Dana Murzyn
- Arena: Pacific Coliseum
- Average attendance: 13,932
- Minor league affiliates: Syracuse Crunch; South Carolina Stingrays

Team leaders
- Goals: Pavel Bure (20)
- Assists: Pavel Bure (23)
- Points: Pavel Bure (43)
- Penalty minutes: Dana Murzyn (129)
- Plus/minus: Dana Murzyn (+14)
- Wins: Kirk McLean (18)
- Goals against average: Kirk McLean (2.75)

The 1994–95 Vancouver Canucks season was the team's 25th NHL campaign. Goaltender Kirk McLean earned all eighteen of the Canucks' wins during the lockout-shortened, 48–game season. Pavel Bure was not the same offensive dynamo that he had been over the prior two seasons, each of which saw him hit the 60-goal mark, but he did still lead the club in goals (20), assists (23, and tied with Jeff Brown), points (43) and shots (198). A trade with the Dallas Stars on April 7, 1995, saw Russ Courtnall join his brother Geoff on the Canucks. The team finished the season with as many wins as losses, good for 6th place in the Western Conference, and they led the league with 12 ties. This was also the team's final season at the Pacific Coliseum before moving to GM Place, now known as Rogers Arena.

== Regular season ==
Pacific Division
No.	CR		GP	W	L	T	GF	GA	Pts
1	2	**Calgary Flames**	48	24	17	7	163	135	55
2	6	**Vancouver Canucks**	48	18	18	12	153	148	48
3	7	**San Jose Sharks**	48	19	25	4	129	161	42
4	9	Los Angeles Kings	48	16	23	9	142	174	41
5	11	Edmonton Oilers	48	17	27	4	136	183	38
6	12	Mighty Ducks of Anaheim	48	16	27	5	125	164	37

Note: No. = Division rank, CR = Conference rank, W = Wins, L = Losses, T = Ties, GF = Goals For, GA = Goals Against, Pts = Points
Teams that qualified for the playoffs are highlighted in bold.

Western Conference
R		Div	GP	W	L	T	GF	GA	Pts
**1**	**p – Detroit Red Wings**	**CEN**	**48**	**33**	**11**	**4**	**180**	**117**	**70**
**2**	**x – Calgary Flames**	**PAC**	**48**	**24**	**17**	**7**	**163**	**135**	**55**
**3**	**St. Louis Blues**	**CEN**	**48**	**28**	**15**	**5**	**178**	**135**	**61**
**4**	**Chicago Blackhawks**	**CEN**	**48**	**24**	**19**	**5**	**156**	**115**	**53**
**5**	**Toronto Maple Leafs**	**CEN**	**48**	**21**	**19**	**8**	**135**	**146**	**50**
**6**	**Vancouver Canucks**	**PAC**	**48**	**18**	**18**	**12**	**153**	**148**	**48**
**7**	**San Jose Sharks**	**PAC**	**48**	**19**	**25**	**4**	**129**	**161**	**42**
**8**	**Dallas Stars**	**CEN**	**48**	**17**	**23**	**8**	**136**	**135**	**42**
9	Los Angeles Kings	PAC	48	16	23	9	142	174	41
10	Winnipeg Jets	CEN	48	16	25	7	157	177	39
11	Edmonton Oilers	PAC	48	17	27	4	136	183	38
12	Mighty Ducks of Anaheim	PAC	48	16	27	5	125	164	37

Divisions: CEN – Central, PAC – Pacific

bold – Qualified for playoffs; x – Won division; p – Won Presidents' Trophy

== Playoffs ==
In the post-season, Vancouver was the clear underdog against the third-place St. Louis Blues, who had members from the 1994 Stanley-Cup champion Rangers team, as well as their head coach, Mike Keenan. After losing game one at the Kiel Center by a score of 2–1, the Canucks won game two by a score of 5–3 behind Kirk McLean's 33-save performance and Pavel Bure's shorthanded insurance goal in the third period. The shots on goal were 26 for Vancouver and 36 for St. Louis, as they had been in the first game. The Canucks carried over their momentum from their win in game two to the Pacific Coliseum for game three, where they triumphed 6–1. Sergio Momesso scored twice. The Canucks were looking to win game four as well, leading 2–1 after Russ Courtnall's shorthanded goal at 4:41 of the second period. But the Blues got their jump from Brendan Shanahan who scored a natural hat trick to give the Blues a 4–2 lead. Glenn Anderson would add another goal at 13:01 of the third period as St. Louis went on to win 5–2 to square the series at two games apiece. In game five at the Kiel Center, the Canucks scored four times on their first 19 shots, as Curtis Joseph would be pulled in favor of Jon Casey. Trailing Vancouver 5–4 with under 12 minutes to play, Murray Baron tied the game at 8:22 of the third period. The game would go into overtime where Cliff Ronning scored at 1:48 of the first overtime period to give the Canucks a 3–2 lead in the series.

Looking to close out the series at home in game six, the Canucks were dominated by the Blues who won by a score of 8–2. Esa Tikkanen (who would soon become a Canuck himself) picked up four points in the game (2 goals and 2 assists). Kirk McLean allowed six goals on just 17 shots. With the series tied at 3–3, a crucial game seven in St. Louis took place on Friday, May 19. Although the Blues had twice as many shots as the Canucks (44–22), Curtis Joseph allowed 4 goals on 21 shots while Kirk McLean made 41 saves. Call-up rookie Adrian Aucoin began a successful NHL career by blasting a slapshot on the power-play to give the Canucks the lead, and Pavel Bure added an empty-net goal with 22 seconds remaining to seal the game 5–3 and earn the Canucks a 4–3 series win. It was Bure's seventh goal of the playoffs. It was a series with marked offensive output, as each team scored 27 goals over the seven games. The Canucks' special teams dominated throughout, as Vancouver scored 11 power-play goals and six short-handed goals in the series.

In the second round, the Canucks faced the Chicago Blackhawks. Both teams skated to a 1–1 tie before Joe Murphy scored the winner at 9:04 of the first overtime period. Blackhawks goaltender Ed Belfour stopped 26 of 27 Vancouver shots. Game two was also close, as Chicago edged Vancouver 2–0 on goals by Jim Cummins and Patrick Poulin. Down two games to none in the series, the Canucks battled desperately to get a win at home in game three, but relinquished leads of 1–0 and 2–1. Ironically it was ex-Canuck Murray Craven who tied the game at 2–2 with 45 seconds remaining in the third period to send the game to overtime. Chris Chelios scored at 6:22 of the first overtime period as the Hawks took a commanding three-games-to-none series lead. In game four, Vancouver broke a 1–1 tie on two goals by Roman Oksiuta to lead 3–1 in the second period, but Chicago came back again on goals by another ex-Canuck Gerald Diduck and Jeremy Roenick, leaving the score after 60 minutes tied at three goals apiece. Once again, the overtime hero was Chris Chelios, who scored 5:35 into the extra frame to give the Blackhawks a 4–0 sweep over the Canucks, advancing them to the third round for the first time in three years.

== Schedule and results ==
=== Regular season ===
1994–95 regular season
January: 1–3–1 (home: 0–1–1; road: 1–2–0)

Game	Date	Score	Opponent	Record	Recap
1	January 20, 1995	1–1 OT	Dallas Stars (1994–95)	0–0–1	T
2	January 21, 1995	1–7	St. Louis Blues (1994–95)	0–1–1	L
3	January 24, 1995	3–6	@ Detroit Red Wings (1994–95)	0–2–1	L
4	January 25, 1995	2–6	@ Toronto Maple Leafs (1994–95)	0–3–1	L
5	January 28, 1995	3–1	@ St. Louis Blues (1994–95)	1–3–1	W

February: 4–4–5 (home: 2–3–3; road: 2–1–2)

Game	Date	Score	Opponent	Record	Recap
6	February 1, 1995	4–4 OT	Toronto Maple Leafs (1994–95)	1–3–2	T
7	February 5, 1995	4–9	Chicago Blackhawks (1994–95)	1–4–2	L
8	February 7, 1995	4–4 OT	Edmonton Oilers (1994–95)	1–4–3	T
9	February 9, 1995	5–1	Winnipeg Jets (1994–95)	2–4–3	W
10	February 11, 1995	1–1 OT	San Jose Sharks (1994–95)	2–4–4	T
11	February 15, 1995	1–3	@ San Jose Sharks (1994–95)	2–5–4	L
12	February 17, 1995	2–2 OT	@ Mighty Ducks of Anaheim (1994–95)	2–5–5	T
13	February 18, 1995	6–2	@ Los Angeles Kings (1994–95)	3–5–5	W
14	February 20, 1995	8–2	Los Angeles Kings (1994–95)	4–5–5	W
15	February 22, 1995	1–4	Winnipeg Jets (1994–95)	4–6–5	L
16	February 24, 1995	3–3 OT	@ Dallas Stars (1994–95)	4–6–6	T
17	February 26, 1995	5–1	@ San Jose Sharks (1994–95)	5–6–6	W
18	February 28, 1995	3–4	San Jose Sharks (1994–95)	5–7–6	L

March: 6–6–2 (home: 4–3–0; road: 2–3–2)

Game	Date	Score	Opponent	Record	Recap
19	March 2, 1995	2–2 OT	@ Calgary Flames (1994–95)	5–7–7	T
20	March 4, 1995	5–4	@ Los Angeles Kings (1994–95)	6–7–7	W
21	March 6, 1995	2–5	Detroit Red Wings (1994–95)	6–8–7	L
22	March 11, 1995	5–3	Mighty Ducks of Anaheim (1994–95)	7–8–7	W
23	March 12, 1995	5–2	@ Edmonton Oilers (1994–95)	8–8–7	W
24	March 14, 1995	3–3 OT	@ Winnipeg Jets (1994–95)	8–8–8	T
25	March 16, 1995	2–9	@ Chicago Blackhawks (1994–95)	8–9–8	L
26	March 17, 1995	1–3	@ Detroit Red Wings (1994–95)	8–10–8	L
27	March 21, 1995	3–1	Toronto Maple Leafs (1994–95)	9–10–8	W
28	March 23, 1995	1–3	Chicago Blackhawks (1994–95)	9–11–8	L
29	March 25, 1995	1–2	Detroit Red Wings (1994–95)	9–12–8	L
30	March 26, 1995	0–2	@ Calgary Flames (1994–95)	9–13–8	L
31	March 29, 1995	5–2	Los Angeles Kings (1994–95)	10–13–8	W
32	March 31, 1995	6–1	Mighty Ducks of Anaheim (1994–95)	11–13–8	W

April: 7–5–3 (home: 4–1–2; road: 3–4–1)

Game	Date	Score	Opponent	Record	Recap
33	April 1, 1995	5–1	@ Edmonton Oilers (1994–95)	12–13–8	W
34	April 4, 1995	2–2 OT	Dallas Stars (1994–95)	12–13–9	T
35	April 7, 1995	4–7	@ Winnipeg Jets (1994–95)	12–14–9	L
36	April 8, 1995	4–2	@ Calgary Flames (1994–95)	13–14–9	W
37	April 11, 1995	5–0	Mighty Ducks of Anaheim (1994–95)	14–14–9	W
38	April 13, 1995	4–6	Edmonton Oilers (1994–95)	14–15–9	L
39	April 15, 1995	3–1	@ Mighty Ducks of Anaheim (1994–95)	15–15–9	W
40	April 17, 1995	2–2 OT	@ Dallas Stars (1994–95)	15–15–10	T
41	April 18, 1995	1–4	@ St. Louis Blues (1994–95)	15–16–10	L
42	April 20, 1995	2–2 OT	Calgary Flames (1994–95)	15–16–11	T
43	April 22, 1995	6–1	Edmonton Oilers (1994–95)	16–16–11	W
44	April 25, 1995	3–4 OT	@ Chicago Blackhawks (1994–95)	16–17–11	L
45	April 26, 1995	2–5	@ Toronto Maple Leafs (1994–95)	16–18–11	L
46	April 28, 1995	3–1	St. Louis Blues (1994–95)	17–18–11	W
47	April 30, 1995	6–4	Calgary Flames (1994–95)	18–18–11	W

May: 0–0–1 (home: 0–0–0; road: 0–0–1)

Game	Date	Score	Opponent	Record	Recap
48	May 3, 1995	3–3 OT	@ San Jose Sharks (1994–95)	18–18–12	T

Legend: W Win (2 points) L Loss (0 points) T Tie (1 point)

=== Playoffs ===
1995 Stanley Cup playoffs
Western Conference Quarterfinals vs. (3) St. Louis Blues – Canucks win 4–3

Game	Date	Score	Opponent	Series	Recap
1	May 7, 1995	1–2	@ St. Louis Blues	Blues lead 1–0	L
2	May 9, 1995	5–3	@ St. Louis Blues	Series tied 1–1	W
3	May 11, 1995	6–1	St. Louis Blues	Canucks lead 2–1	W
4	May 13, 1995	2–5	St. Louis Blues	Series tied 2–2	L
5	May 15, 1995	6–5 OT	@ St. Louis Blues	Canucks lead 3–2	W
6	May 17, 1995	2–8	St. Louis Blues	Series tied 3–3	L
7	May 19, 1995	5–3	@ St. Louis Blues	Canucks win 4–3	W

Western Conference Semifinals vs. (4) Chicago Blackhawks – Blackhawks win 4–0

Game	Date	Score	Opponent	Series	Recap
1	May 21, 1995	1–2 OT	@ Chicago Blackhawks	Blackhawks lead 1–0	L
2	May 23, 1995	0–2	@ Chicago Blackhawks	Blackhawks lead 2–0	L
3	May 25, 1995	2–3 OT	Chicago Blackhawks	Blackhawks lead 3–0	L
4	May 27, 1995	3–4 OT	Chicago Blackhawks	Blackhawks win 4–0	L

Legend: W Win L Loss

== Player statistics ==
=== Scoring ===
- Position abbreviations: C = Centre; D = Defence; G = Goaltender; LW = Left wing; RW = Right wing
- † = Joined team via a transaction (e.g., trade, waivers, signing) during the season. Stats reflect time with the Canucks only.
- ‡ = Left team via a transaction (e.g., trade, waivers, release) during the season. Stats reflect time with the Canucks only.

No.	Player	Pos	Regular season						Playoffs					
No.	Player	Pos	GP	G	A	Pts	+/-	PIM	GP	G	A	Pts	+/-	PIM
10	Pavel Bure	LW	44	20	23	43	−8	48	11	7	6	13	−1	10
16	Trevor Linden	C	48	18	22	40	−5	40	11	2	6	8	−1	12
14	Geoff Courtnall	LW	45	16	18	34	2	81	11	4	2	6	−8	34
22	Jeff Brown	D	33	8	23	31	−2	16	5	1	3	4	2	2
27	Sergio Momesso	LW	48	10	15	25	−2	65	11	3	1	4	−5	16
7	Cliff Ronning	C	41	6	19	25	−4	27	11	3	5	8	−5	2
23	Martin Gelinas	RW	46	13	10	23	8	36	3	0	1	1	1	0
42	Josef Beranek†	C	37	8	13	21	−10	28	11	1	1	2	−7	12
9	Russ Courtnall†	RW	13	4	14	18	10	4	11	4	8	12	1	21
21	Jyrki Lumme	D	36	5	12	17	4	26	11	2	6	8	0	8
8	Greg Adams‡	LW	31	5	10	15	1	12	—	—	—	—	—	—
44	Dave Babych	D	40	3	11	14	−13	18	11	2	2	4	−8	14
3	Bret Hedican	D	45	2	11	13	−3	34	11	0	2	2	−5	6
33	Michael Peca	C	33	6	6	12	−6	30	5	0	1	1	0	8
20	Christian Ruuttu†	LW	25	5	6	11	11	23	9	1	1	2	−3	0
29	Gino Odjick	LW	23	4	5	9	−3	109	5	0	0	0	−2	47
25	Nathan LaFayette‡	C	27	4	4	8	2	2	—	—	—	—	—	—
5	Dana Murzyn	D	40	0	8	8	14	129	8	0	1	1	−1	22
28	Roman Oksiuta†	RW	12	5	2	7	2	2	10	2	3	5	0	0
24	Jiri Slegr‡	D	19	1	5	6	0	32	—	—	—	—	—	—
19	Tim Hunter	RW	34	3	2	5	1	120	11	0	0	0	−3	22
4	Gerald Diduck‡	D	22	1	3	4	−8	15	—	—	—	—	—	—
15	John McIntyre	C	28	0	4	4	−3	37	—	—	—	—	—	—
34	Jassen Cullimore	D	34	1	2	3	−2	39	11	0	0	0	−4	12
2	Evgeny Namestnikov	D	16	0	3	3	2	4	1	0	0	0	0	2
9	Gary Leeman	RW	10	2	0	2	−3	0	—	—	—	—	—	—
6	Adrian Aucoin	D	1	1	0	1	1	0	4	1	0	1	−1	0
20	Jose Charbonneau	RW	3	1	0	1	0	0	—	—	—	—	—	—
36	Dane Jackson	RW	3	1	0	1	0	4	6	0	0	0	−2	10
1	Kirk McLean	G	40	0	1	1		4	11	0	1	1		0
6	Adrien Plavsic‡	D	3	0	1	1	3	4	—	—	—	—	—	—
24	Scott Walker	D	11	0	1	1	0	33	—	—	—	—	—	—
35	Kay Whitmore	G	11	0	1	1		7	1	0	0	0		0
18	Shawn Antoski‡	LW	7	0	0	0	−4	46	—	—	—	—	—	—
25	Alek Stojanov	RW	4	0	0	0	−2	13	5	0	0	0	0	2
4	Mark Wotton	D	1	0	0	0	1	0	5	0	0	0	0	4

=== Goaltending ===
No.	Player	Regular season										Playoffs								
No.	Player	GP	W	L	T	SA	GA	GAA	SV%	SO	TOI	GP	W	L	SA	GA	GAA	SV%	SO	TOI
1	Kirk McLean	40	18	12	10	1140	109	2.75	.904	1	2374	11	4	7	336	36	3.27	.893	0	660
35	Kay Whitmore	11	0	6	2	279	37	3.98	.867	0	558	1	0	0	18	2	6.00	.889	0	20

== Awards and records ==
=== Awards ===
Type	Award/honour	Recipient	Ref
Team	Babe Pratt Trophy	Jeff Brown	
Team	Cyclone Taylor Trophy	Trevor Linden	
Team	Cyrus H. McLean Trophy	Pavel Bure	
Team	Fred J. Hume Award	Martin Gelinas	
Team	Molson Cup	Kirk McLean	
Team	Most Exciting Player Award	Pavel Bure	

=== Milestones ===
Milestone	Player	Date	Ref
First game	Jassen Cullimore	February 17, 1995	
First game	Scott Walker	April 13, 1995	
First game	Alek Stojanov	April 20, 1995	
First game	Adrian Aucoin	May 3, 1995	
First game	Mark Wotton	May 3, 1995	

== Draft picks ==
Vancouver's draft picks at the 1994 NHL entry draft held at the Hartford Civic Center in Hartford, Connecticut.

Round	#	Player	Nationality	College/Junior/Club team (League)
1	13	Mattias Ohlund	Sweden	Luleå HF (Sweden)
2	39	Robb Gordon	Canada	Powell River Kings (BCHL)
2	42	Dave Scatchard	Canada	Portland Winter Hawks (WHL)
3	65	Chad Allen	Canada	Saskatoon Blades (WHL)
4	92	Mike Dubinsky	Canada	Brandon Wheat Kings (WHL)
5	117	Yanick Dube	Canada	Laval Titan (QMJHL)
7	169	Yuri Kuznetsov	Russia	Avangard Omsk (Russia)
8	195	Rob Trumbley	Canada	Moose Jaw Warriors (WHL)
9	221	Bill Muckalt	Canada	Kelowna Spartans (BCHL)
10	247	Tyson Nash	Canada	Kamloops Blazers (WHL)
11	273	Robert Longpre	Canada	Medicine Hat Tigers (WHL)
