= Dean Kennedy =

Canadian ice hockey player (born 1963)

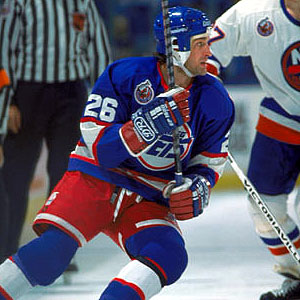
- Kennedy as a member of the original Winnipeg Jets in 1992–93
- Born: January 18, 1963 (age 63) Redvers, Saskatchewan, Canada
- Height: 6 ft 1 in (185 cm)
- Weight: 195 lb (88 kg; 13 st 13 lb)
- Position: Defence
- Shot: Right
- Played for: Los Angeles Kings; New York Rangers; Buffalo Sabres; Winnipeg Jets; Edmonton Oilers
- National team: Canada
- NHL draft: 39th overall, 1981; Los Angeles Kings
- Playing career: 1982–1995

Edward Dean Kennedy (born January 18, 1963) is a Canadian former professional ice hockey player. Kennedy played in the National Hockey League (NHL) from 1982 to 1995 for the Los Angeles Kings, New York Rangers, Buffalo Sabres, Winnipeg Jets and Edmonton Oilers.

== Career statistics ==
			Regular season					Playoffs
Season	Team	League	GP	G	A	Pts	PIM	GP	G	A	Pts	PIM
1979–80	Weyburn Red Wings	SJHL	57	12	20	32	64	—	—	—	—	—
1979–80	Brandon Wheat Kings	WHL	1	0	0	0	0	—	—	—	—	—
1980–81	Brandon Wheat Kings	WHL	71	3	29	32	157	5	0	2	2	7
1981–82	Brandon Wheat Kings	WHL	49	5	38	43	103	—	—	—	—	—
1982–83	Brandon Wheat Kings	WHL	14	2	15	17	22	—	—	—	—	—
1982–83	Los Angeles Kings	NHL	55	0	12	12	97	—	—	—	—	—
1982–83	Saskatoon Blades	WHL	—	—	—	—	—	4	0	3	3	0
1983–84	Los Angeles Kings	NHL	37	1	5	6	50	—	—	—	—	—
1983–84	New Haven Nighthawks	AHL	26	1	7	8	23	—	—	—	—	—
1984–85	New Haven Nighthawks	AHL	76	3	14	17	104	—	—	—	—	—
1985–86	Los Angeles Kings	NHL	78	2	10	12	132	—	—	—	—	—
1986–87	Los Angeles Kings	NHL	66	6	14	20	91	5	0	2	2	10
1987–88	Los Angeles Kings	NHL	58	1	11	12	158	4	0	1	1	10
1988–89	Los Angeles Kings	NHL	51	3	10	13	63	11	0	2	2	8
1988–89	New York Rangers	NHL	16	0	1	1	40	—	—	—	—	—
1989–90	Buffalo Sabres	NHL	80	2	12	14	53	6	1	1	2	12
1990–91	Buffalo Sabres	NHL	64	4	8	12	119	2	0	1	1	17
1991–92	Winnipeg Jets	NHL	18	2	4	6	21	2	0	0	0	0
1992–93	Winnipeg Jets	NHL	78	1	7	8	105	6	0	0	0	2
1993–94	Winnipeg Jets	NHL	76	2	8	10	164	—	—	—	—	—
1994–95	Edmonton Oilers	NHL	40	2	8	10	25	—	—	—	—	—
NHL totals			717	26	110	136	1,118	36	1	7	8	59

Preceded by Troy Murray	Winnipeg Jets captain 1993	Succeeded by Keith Tkachuk
