= Micah Aivazoff =

Canadian ice hockey player (born 1969)

- Born: May 4, 1969 (age 56) Powell River, British Columbia, Canada
- Height: 6 ft 1 in (185 cm)
- Weight: 185 lb (84 kg; 13 st 3 lb)
- Position: Centre
- Shot: Left
- Played for: Detroit Red Wings; Edmonton Oilers; New York Islanders; SERC Wild Wings
- NHL draft: 109th overall, 1988; Los Angeles Kings
- Playing career: 1989–2002

Micah Aivazoff (born May 4, 1969) is a Canadian former professional ice hockey centre. He played 92 games in the National Hockey League with the Detroit Red Wings, Edmonton Oilers, and New York Islanders between 1993 and 1996. The rest of his career, which lasted from 1989 to 2002, was mainly spent in the minor leagues.

== Playing career ==
His junior career was spent with the Victoria Cougars, in the Western Hockey League, and he was selected in the sixth round of the 1988 NHL entry draft, 109th overall, by the Los Angeles Kings. He went on to play with the Detroit Red Wings, Edmonton Oilers, and New York Islanders of the NHL, as well as with various minor league and European teams.

== Career statistics ==
=== Regular season and playoffs ===
			Regular season					Playoffs
Season	Team	League	GP	G	A	Pts	PIM	GP	G	A	Pts	PIM
1985–86	Sidney Capitals	BCHL	33	14	20	34	68	—	—	—	—	—
1985–86	Victoria Cougars	WHL	25	3	4	7	25	—	—	—	—	—
1986–87	Victoria Cougars	WHL	72	18	39	57	112	5	1	0	1	2
1987–88	Victoria Cougars	WHL	69	26	57	83	79	8	3	4	7	14
1988–89	Victoria Cougars	WHL	70	35	65	100	136	8	5	7	12	2
1989–90	New Haven Nighthawks	AHL	77	20	39	59	71	—	—	—	—	—
1990–91	New Haven Nighthawks	AHL	79	11	29	40	84	—	—	—	—	—
1991–92	Adirondack Red Wings	AHL	61	9	20	29	50	19	2	8	10	25
1992–93	Adirondack Red Wings	AHL	79	32	53	85	100	11	8	6	14	10
1993–94	Detroit Red Wings	NHL	59	4	4	8	38	—	—	—	—	—
1994–95	Edmonton Oilers	NHL	21	0	1	1	2	—	—	—	—	—
1995–96	New York Islanders	NHL	12	0	1	1	6	—	—	—	—	—
1995–96	Utah Grizzlies	IHL	59	14	21	35	58	22	3	5	8	33
1996–97	Binghamton Rangers	AHL	75	12	36	48	70	4	1	1	2	0
1997–98	ERC Ingolstadt	GER-2	19	10	19	29	59	—	—	—	—	—
1997–98	San Antonio Dragons	IHL	54	13	33	46	33	—	—	—	—	—
1998–99	Utah Grizzlies	IHL	79	25	22	47	67	—	—	—	—	—
1999–00	Utah Grizzlies	IHL	80	15	31	46	81	5	0	0	0	4
2000–01	SERC Wild Wings	DEL	59	9	15	24	48	—	—	—	—	—
2001–02	SERC Wild Wings	DEL	36	4	10	14	32	—	—	—	—	—
AHL totals			371	84	177	261	375	34	11	15	26	35
NHL totals			92	4	6	10	46	—	—	—	—	—

== Transactions ==
- February 5, 1988: Los Angeles Kings trades the rights to Aivazoff to the Pittsburgh Penguins in exchange for Brian Engblom
- March 18, 1993: Signs with Detroit Red Wings
- August 23, 1993: Signs with the New York Islanders
- January 18, 1995: Pittsburgh Penguins claims Aivazoff in place of cash from the Detroit Red Wings in the NHL Waiver Draft, then the Edmonton Oilers claimed Aivazoff from Pittsburgh
- August 23, 1996: Signs with the New York Rangers
