= Pauli Jaks =

Swiss ice hockey player

- Born: January 25, 1972 (age 54) Schaffhausen, Switzerland
- Height: 6 ft 0 in (183 cm)
- Weight: 185 lb (84 kg; 13 st 3 lb)
- Position: Goaltender
- Caught: Left
- Played for: Genève-Servette HC; SC Langnau; Avangard Omsk; HC Ambrì-Piotta; Los Angeles Kings
- National team: Switzerland
- NHL draft: 108th overall, 1991; Los Angeles Kings
- Playing career: 1989–2006

Pauli Jaks (born January 25, 1972) is a Swiss former professional ice hockey goaltender who played one game in the NHL with the Los Angeles Kings during the 1994–95 season. The rest of his career, which lasted from 1989 to 2006, was mainly spent in the Swiss Nationalliga A. Internationally Jaks played for the Swiss national team at the junior and senior level, including the 1996 World Championship B Pool.

== Biography ==
Jaks played in the 1985 Quebec International Pee-Wee Hockey Tournament with a Swiss-Italian youth team.

Jaks was selected in the 5th round (108th overall) in the 1991 NHL entry draft by the Los Angeles Kings. He played one game for the Kings, on January 29, 1995, against the Chicago Blackhawks. Jaks was the first Swiss-trained player to appear in the NHL.

Jaks also played in the IHL for the Phoenix Roadrunners, but he is best known for his play in the Switzerland National League A.

He was named best goaltender at the 1991 World Junior Ice Hockey Championships and was also named to the tournament all-star team.

== Career statistics ==
=== Regular season and playoffs ===
| | | | Regular season | | | | | | | | | Playoffs |
| Season | Team | League | GP | W | L | T | MIN | GA | SO | GAA | SV% | GP | W | L | MIN | GA | SO | GAA | SV% |
|---|---|---|---|---|---|---|---|---|---|---|---|---|---|---|---|---|---|---|---|
| 1989–90 | HC Ambrì-Piotta | NLA | 8 | — | — | — | 316 | 31 | 0 | 5.89 | — | — | — | — | — | — | — | — | — |
| 1990–91 | HC Ambrì-Piotta | NLA | 22 | — | — | — | 1247 | 100 | 0 | 4.81 | — | 4 | — | — | — | — | — | 6.52 | — |
| 1991–92 | HC Ambrì-Piotta | NLA | 33 | 25 | 7 | 1 | 1890 | 97 | 2 | 2.93 | — | 9 | — | — | — | — | — | 3.78 | — |
| 1992–93 | HC Ambrì-Piotta | NLA | 29 | — | — | — | 1740 | 92 | 0 | 3.17 | — | 9 | — | — | — | — | — | 3.41 | — |
| 1993–94 | Phoenix Roadrunners | IHL | 33 | 16 | 13 | 1 | 1712 | 101 | 0 | 3.54 | .892 | — | — | — | — | — | — | — | — |
| 1994–95 | Los Angeles Kings | NHL | 1 | 0 | 0 | 0 | 40 | 2 | 0 | 3.00 | .920 | — | — | — | — | — | — | — | — |
| 1994–95 | Phoenix Roadrunners | IHL | 15 | 2 | 4 | 4 | 635 | 44 | 0 | 4.15 | .873 | — | — | — | — | — | — | — | — |
| 1995–96 | HC Ambrì-Piotta | NLA | 30 | — | — | — | 1799 | 106 | 0 | 3.53 | — | 6 | — | — | — | — | — | 4.00 | — |
| 1996–97 | HC Ambrì-Piotta | NLA | 42 | — | — | — | 2486 | 143 | 0 | 3.45 | — | — | — | — | — | — | — | — | — |
| 1997–98 | HC Ambrì-Piotta | NLA | 28 | — | — | — | 1645 | 81 | 0 | 2.95 | — | 3 | — | — | 169 | 12 | 0 | 4.26 | — |
| 1998–99 | HC Ambrì-Piotta | NLA | 41 | — | — | — | 2440 | 90 | 0 | 2.21 | — | 15 | — | — | 915 | 30 | 0 | 1.97 | — |
| 1999–00 | HC Ambrì-Piotta | NLA | 39 | — | — | — | 2211 | 92 | 3 | 2.50 | — | 9 | — | — | 485 | 24 | 1 | 2.97 | — |
| 2000–01 | HC Ambrì-Piotta | NLA | 38 | — | — | — | 2245 | 108 | 6 | 2.89 | — | 5 | — | — | 320 | 5 | 3 | 0.94 | — |
| 2001–02 | HC Ambrì-Piotta | NLA | 41 | — | — | — | 2440 | 102 | 4 | 2.51 | — | 6 | — | — | 391 | 16 | 0 | 2.46 | — |
| 2002–03 | HC Ambrì-Piotta | NLA | 36 | — | — | — | 2210 | 106 | 2 | 2.88 | — | 4 | — | — | 240 | 15 | 0 | 3.75 | — |
| 2003–04 | HC Ambrì-Piotta | NLA | 26 | — | — | — | 1484 | 81 | 0 | 3.27 | — | — | — | — | — | — | — | — | — |
| 2004–05 | Avangard Omsk | RSL | 8 | 3 | 3 | 0 | 418 | 16 | 1 | 2.29 | .910 | — | — | — | — | — | — | — | — |
| 2004–05 | Omskie Yastreby | RUS-3 | 1 | — | — | — | 60 | 2 | — | 2.00 | — | — | — | — | — | — | — | — | — |
| 2004–05 | SC Langnau | NLA | 21 | — | — | — | 1268 | 78 | 0 | 3.69 | — | 6 | — | — | 333 | 20 | 1 | 3.60 | — |
| 2005–06 | Genève-Servette HC | NLA | 1 | 0 | 1 | 0 | 29 | 5 | 0 | 10.37 | — | — | — | — | — | — | — | — | — |
| 2005–06 | Forward Morges HC | NLB | 10 | — | — | — | — | — | — | 3.40 | — | — | — | — | — | — | — | — | — |
| NHL totals | | | 1 | 0 | 0 | 0 | 40 | 2 | 0 | 3.00 | .920 | — | — | — | — | — | — | — | — |

=== International ===
| Year | Team | Event | GP | W | L | T | MIN | GA | SO | GAA | SV% |
|---|---|---|---|---|---|---|---|---|---|---|---|
| 1990 | Switzerland | EJC | 4 | — | — | — | — | — | — | 5.77 | .775 |
| 1991 | Switzerland | WJC | 5 | 1 | 4 | 0 | 300 | 30 | 0 | 6.00 | — |
| 1992 | Switzerland | WJC | 5 | 1 | 4 | 0 | 300 | 31 | 0 | 6.20 | .828 |
| 1996 | Switzerland | WC-B | 1 | 1 | 0 | 0 | 60 | 1 | 0 | 1.00 | .944 |
| Junior totals | | | 14 | — | — | — | — | — | — | — | — |
| Senior totals | | | 1 | 1 | 0 | 0 | 60 | 1 | 0 | 1.00 | .944 |

== See also ==
- List of players who played only one game in the NHL
