= Warren Rychel =

Canadian ice hockey player (born 1967)

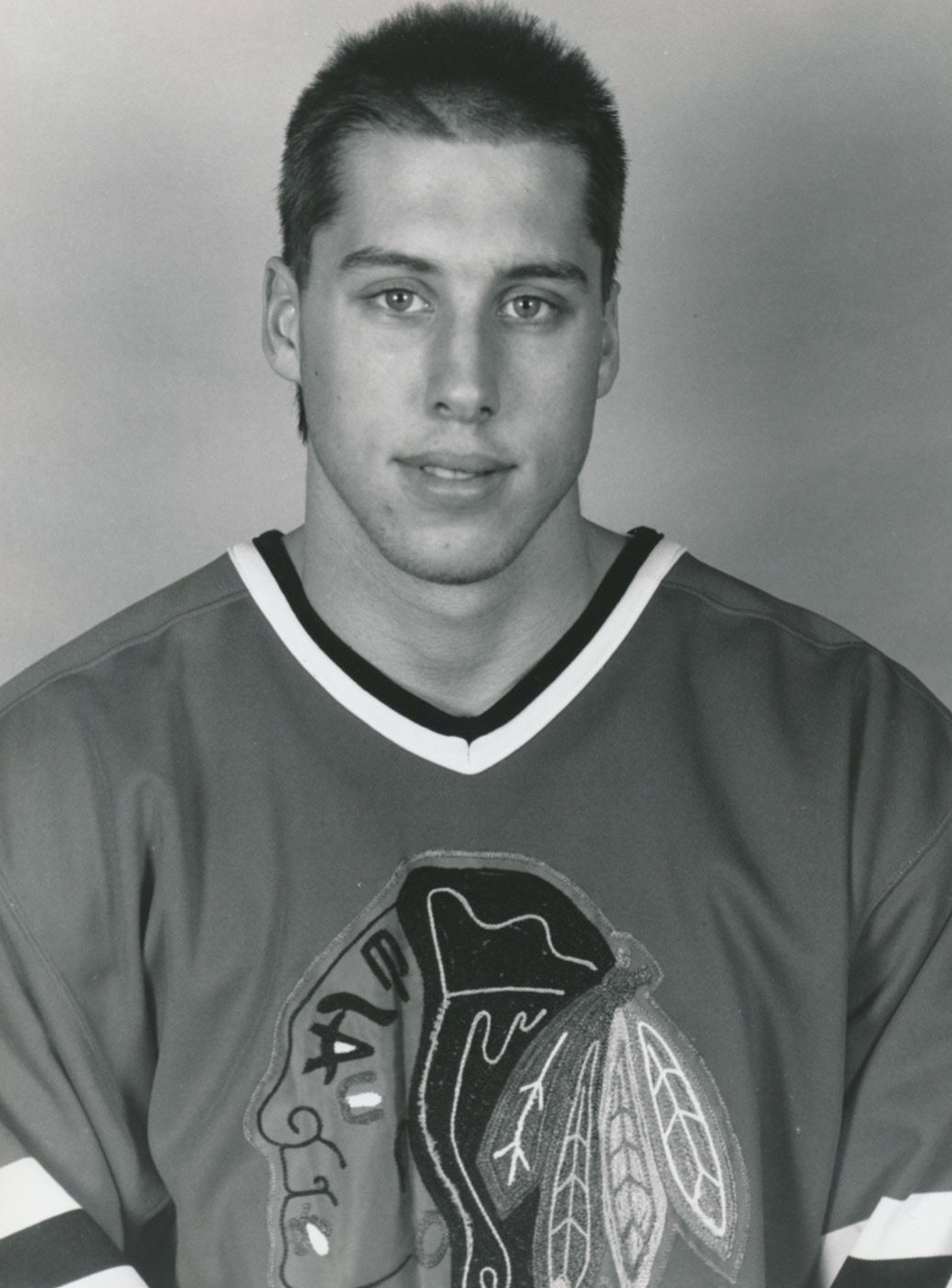
- Rychel with the Chicago Blackhawks in 1987
- Born: May 12, 1967 (age 59) London, Ontario, Canada
- Height: 6 ft 0 in (183 cm)
- Weight: 205 lb (93 kg; 14 st 9 lb)
- Position: Left wing
- Shot: Left
- Played for: Chicago Blackhawks; Los Angeles Kings; Toronto Maple Leafs; Colorado Avalanche; Mighty Ducks of Anaheim
- NHL draft: Undrafted
- Playing career: 1987–1999

Warren Stanley Rychel (born May 12, 1967) is a Canadian former professional ice hockey left winger who played thirteen seasons of Pro hockey including nine seasons in the National Hockey League. Rychel is currently the Pro Scouting Director with the Edmonton Oilers Hockey Club.

== Playing career ==
Rychel was primarily an enforcer drawing 1,422 career penalty minutes. He scored 38 goals and 77 points in his NHL career. However, he did have a few memorable offensive outbursts, especially in the Stanley Cup playoffs.

In the 1991 playoffs, after playing the whole season in the minor leagues, Rychel was called up to play with the Chicago Blackhawks and had only two games of previous NHL experience. He managed to score a goal and four points in only three games. In the 1993 playoffs, Rychel was playing with the Los Angeles Kings, and that season had played his first full season in the NHL. He scored 6 goals and 13 points in 23 playoff games, including two game-winning goals, and once again helped his team to the Stanley Cup Final. However, Rychel did manage to win the Stanley Cup in 1996 when he was playing with the Colorado Avalanche. Rychel retired from the NHL in 1999.

== Hockey executive ==
Rychel was the general manager of the Windsor Spitfires teams that won the 2009 Memorial Cup, 2010 Memorial Cup, and the 2017 Memorial Cup championships. As of 2017, Rychel became one of only three general managers to assemble three Memorial Cup winning teams; the others are Matt Leyden of the Oshawa Generals, and Bob Brown of the Kamloops Blazers.

After spending 13 years with the Spitfires, Rychel announced in July 2019 that he was selling his minority interest in the Ontario Hockey League team and stepping down as general manager.

== Personal life ==
Rychel's son, Kerby was drafted by the Columbus Blue Jackets in the first round of the 2013 NHL entry draft.

== Career statistics ==
=== Regular season and playoffs ===
			Regular season					Playoffs
Season	Team	League	GP	G	A	Pts	PIM	GP	G	A	Pts	PIM
1984–85	Sudbury Wolves	OHL	35	5	8	13	74	—	—	—	—	—
1984–85	Guelph Platers	OHL	29	1	3	4	48	—	—	—	—	—
1985–86	Guelph Platers	OHL	38	14	5	19	119	—	—	—	—	—
1985–86	Ottawa 67's	OHL	29	11	18	29	54	—	—	—	—	—
1986–87	Ottawa 67's	OHL	28	11	7	18	57	—	—	—	—	—
1986–87	Kitchener Rangers	OHL	21	5	5	10	39	4	0	0	0	9
1987–88	Peoria Rivermen	IHL	7	2	1	3	7	—	—	—	—	—
1987–88	Saginaw Hawks	IHL	51	2	7	9	113	1	0	0	0	0
1988–89	Saginaw Hawks	IHL	50	15	14	29	226	6	0	0	0	51
1988–89	Chicago Blackhawks	NHL	2	0	0	0	17	—	—	—	—	—
1989–90	Indianapolis Ice	IHL	77	23	16	39	374	14	1	3	4	64
1990–91	Indianapolis Ice	IHL	68	33	30	63	338	5	2	1	3	30
1990–91	Chicago Blackhawks	NHL	—	—	—	—	—	3	1	3	4	2
1991–92	Kalamazoo Wings	IHL	45	15	20	35	165	8	0	3	3	51
1991–92	Moncton Hawks	AHL	36	14	15	29	211	—	—	—	—	—
1992–93	Los Angeles Kings	NHL	70	6	7	13	314	23	6	7	13	39
1993–94	Los Angeles Kings	NHL	80	10	9	19	322	—	—	—	—	—
1994–95	Los Angeles Kings	NHL	7	0	0	0	19	—	—	—	—	—
1994–95	Toronto Maple Leafs	NHL	26	1	6	7	101	3	0	0	0	0
1995–96	Colorado Avalanche	NHL	52	6	2	8	147	12	1	0	1	23
1996–97	Mighty Ducks of Anaheim	NHL	70	10	7	17	218	11	0	2	2	19
1997–98	Mighty Ducks of Anaheim	NHL	63	5	6	11	198	—	—	—	—	—
1997–98	Colorado Avalanche	NHL	8	0	0	0	23	6	0	0	0	24
1998–99	Colorado Avalanche	NHL	28	0	2	2	63	12	0	1	1	14
NHL totals			406	38	39	77	1422	70	8	13	21	121
IHL totals			334	104	103	207	1223	34	3	7	10	196

== Coaching record ==
=== Ontario Hockey League ===
Team	Year	Regular season						Postseason
Team	Year	G	W	L	OTL	Pts	Finish	Result
BAR	2019–20	41	16	21	4	36	2nd in Central	Replaced on January 20, 2020
OHL totals	2019–2020	41	16	21	4	36		0-0 (0.000)
