= Roman Oksiuta =

Russian ice hockey player

- Born: 21 August 1970 (age 56) Murmansk, Russian SFSR, Soviet Union
- Height: 6 ft 4 in (193 cm)
- Weight: 225 lb (102 kg; 16 st 1 lb)
- Position: Right wing
- Shot: Left
- Played for: Edmonton Oilers; Vancouver Canucks; Mighty Ducks of Anaheim; Pittsburgh Penguins; Khimik Voskresensk
- National team: Soviet Union and Russia
- NHL draft: 202nd overall, 1989; New York Rangers
- Playing career: 1987–2006

Roman Nikolaevich Oksiuta (Russian: Роман Николаевич Оксюта; born 21 August 1970) is a Russian former professional ice hockey player who played in the National Hockey League (NHL) for the Edmonton Oilers, Vancouver Canucks, Mighty Ducks of Anaheim and the Pittsburgh Penguins.

== Playing career ==
Oksiuta played a total of 153 regular season games, scoring 46 goals and 41 assists for 87 points and collecting 100 penalty minutes. Oksiuta was drafted in the 10th round, 202nd overall by the New York Rangers in the 1989 NHL entry draft but was traded to Edmonton for Oilers' captain, Kevin Lowe, while he was still playing in Russia. He also had a spell in Finland's SM-liiga for KalPa and Lukko. He returned to Russia in 1999 and played in the Vysshaya Liga for Khimik Voskresensk where he began his career in 1987. In 2003 the team were promoted to the Russian Super League. He retired in 2006.

Oksiuta represented the Soviet national team and later the Russian national team at the IIHF World Championships; winning gold (1989) and silver (1990) with the Soviet Union.

== Career statistics ==
=== Regular season and playoffs ===
			Regular season					Playoffs
Season	Team	League	GP	G	A	Pts	PIM	GP	G	A	Pts	PIM
1987–88	Khimik Voskresensk	Soviet	11	1	0	1	4	—	—	—	—	—
1988–89	Khimik Voskresensk	Soviet	34	13	3	16	14	—	—	—	—	—
1989–90	Khimik Voskresensk	Soviet	37	13	6	19	16	—	—	—	—	—
1990–91	Khimik Voskresensk	Soviet	41	12	8	20	24	—	—	—	—	—
1991–92	Khimik Voskresensk	CIS	35	22	14	36	20	7	2	6	8	8
1992–93	Khimik Voskresensk	RUS	20	11	2	13	42	—	—	—	—	—
1992–93	Cape Breton Oilers	AHL	43	26	25	51	22	16	9	19	28	12
1993–94	Edmonton Oilers	NHL	10	1	2	3	4	—	—	—	—	—
1993–94	Cape Breton Oilers	AHL	47	31	22	53	90	4	2	2	4	22
1994–95	Edmonton Oilers	NHL	26	11	2	13	8	—	—	—	—	—
1994–95	Cape Breton Oilers	AHL	25	9	7	16	20	—	—	—	—	—
1994–95	Vancouver Canucks	NHL	12	5	2	7	2	10	2	3	5	0
1995–96	Vancouver Canucks	NHL	56	16	23	39	42	—	—	—	—	—
1995–96	Mighty Ducks of Anaheim	NHL	14	7	5	12	18	—	—	—	—	—
1996–97	Mighty Ducks of Anaheim	NHL	28	6	7	13	22	—	—	—	—	—
1996–97	Pittsburgh Penguins	NHL	7	0	0	0	0	—	—	—	—	—
1997–98	Furuset Ishockey	NOR	10	10	7	17	44	—	—	—	—	—
1997–98	Fort Wayne Komets	IHL	19	5	8	13	50	3	0	0	0	12
1998–99	KalPa	SM-l	10	4	2	6	55	—	—	—	—	—
1998–99	Lukko	SM-l	16	0	7	7	79	—	—	—	—	—
1999–2000	Khimik Voskresensk	RUS II	22	17	17	34	92	—	—	—	—	—
2000–01	Khimik Voskresensk	RUS II	39	26	26	52	63	4	1	1	2	14
2001–02	Khimik Voskresensk	RUS II	36	18	30	48	42	8	3	3	6	8
2002–03	Khimik Voskresensk	RUS II	28	19	10	29	35	11	8	7	15	4
2003–04	Khimik Voskresensk	RSL	18	4	1	5	42	—	—	—	—	—
2005–06	Khimik Voskresensk	RUS II	3	0	1	1	0	—	—	—	—	—
Soviet/CIS totals			158	61	31	92	78	7	2	6	8	8
AHL totals			115	66	54	120	132	20	11	21	32	34
NHL totals			153	46	41	87	96	10	2	3	5	0

=== International ===
Year	Team	Event	Place	GP	G	A	Pts	PIM
1988	Soviet Union	EJC	3rd place, bronze medalist(s)	6	5	6	11	4
1989	Soviet Union	WJC	1st place, gold medalist(s)	7	6	3	9	4
1990	Soviet Union	WJC	2nd place, silver medalist(s)	7	7	2	9	4
1996	Russia	WC	4th	8	3	0	3	2
Junior totals				20	18	11	29	12
