= Dixon Ward =

Canadian ice hockey player (born 1968)

- Born: September 23, 1968 (age 57) Leduc, Alberta, Canada
- Height: 6 ft 0 in (183 cm)
- Weight: 200 lb (91 kg; 14 st 4 lb)
- Position: Right Wing
- Shot: Right
- Played for: Vancouver Canucks; Los Angeles Kings; Toronto Maple Leafs; Buffalo Sabres; Boston Bruins; New York Rangers
- NHL draft: 128th overall, 1988; Vancouver Canucks
- Playing career: 1992–2003

Dixon McRae Ward III (born September 23, 1968) is a Canadian former professional ice hockey player. He was drafted in the seventh round, 128th overall, by the Vancouver Canucks in the 1988 NHL entry draft. Ward spent his NHL career with the Canucks, Los Angeles Kings, Toronto Maple Leafs, Buffalo Sabres, Boston Bruins, and New York Rangers. In his NHL career, Ward appeared in 537 games, scoring 95 goals and adding 129 assists.

== Personal life ==
Ward was born on September 23, 1968, in Leduc, Alberta, Canada, to Dixon Ward II. His father was a goaltender with the senior Edmonton Movers and a scout for the Medicine Hat Tigers. Both Dixon and his younger brother Colin played collegiate ice hockey. Ward's son Taylor is also a professional hockey player.

== Career ==
=== Junior ===
As a youth, Ward played two seasons with the Red Deer Rustlers in the Alberta Junior Hockey League. After failing to receive a scholarship offer in his rookie season, Ward focused on improving his skating before the 1987–88 season. By December of his sophomore season, Ward had scored 31 goals through 25 games and ranked third in league scoring. His improvements began to attract the attention of at least six collegiate recruiters. He finished the season with 131 points and was recognised as team MVP. He also received a scholarship to play college hockey for the North Dakota Fighting Sioux at the University of North Dakota (UND). Prior to his freshman season at UND, Ward was drafted in the seventh round of the 1988 NHL entry draft by the Vancouver Canucks.

=== Collegiate ===
Ward spent four seasons with the North Dakota Fighting Sioux at UND while earning a degree in journalism.

While playing the majority of his freshman season with a hand cast, Ward scored eight goals and nine assists through 37 games. He scored his first collegiate goal on November 26, 1988, against the Denver Pioneers. During the opening round of the 1988 Great Lakes Invitational tournament, Ward recorded his first collegiate hat-trick. He finished the season as the team's Most Improved Player. Ward improved drastically in his sophomore season and finished with a career-best 35 goals and 69 points. By November 1989, Ward ranked third in team scoring with seven goals and seven assists.

Ward started his junior season with 10 goals through his first nine games, despite suffering from a shoulder injury.

At the end of his college career, Ward set numerous program records, including becoming the first Sioux player to record 100 goals and 100 assists. He also ranked second all-time in scoring with 219 points, although this record was later surpassed by Greg Johnson.

=== Professional ===
After earning his journalism degree from UND, Ward signed a $150,000 contract with the Canucks for the 1992–93 season. During his rookie season with the Canucks, Ward wrote a column for the Vancouver Sun detailing his first year in the NHL. He made his NHL debut on October 6, 1992, against the Edmonton Oilers and recorded an assist on Greg Adams' goal. Ward wore jersey number 17 in his debut, as his usual jersey number has been retired by the Canucks. He recorded two more points over the Canucks' next two games to help them start the 1992–93 season with a perfect 3-0-0 record. Ward scored his first career NHL goal on October 16 against the Winnipeg Jets to help lead the Canucks to a 6–2 win. He continued to score through October and November and tallied 10 points through his first 10 games. By mid-December, Ward had tallied 10 goals and 12 assists for 22 points through 26 games. George McPhee, the team's director of operations, praised Ward's quick acclimation into the Canucks lineup. Ward continued to rank amongst the rookie league leaders in scoring through March, accumulating 18 goals and 28 assists. He was on pace to best the Canucks' rookie scoring record before suffering an ankle injury on March 14, 1993, during a game against the Calgary Flames. Even once he recovered, Ward struggled to return to the Canucks lineup due to an abundance of qualified players. He finished his rookie season with 22 goals and 30 assists for 52 points.

Following his rookie season, Ward spent the summer in Vancouver training with the Canucks' strength and conditioning coach. He scored five points in Vancouver's four preseason games, but told members of the media he expected to earn a bottom-six role in the 1993–94 season. However, while he spent most of training camp on the left wing, an impromptu signing shifted him into a right wing role. After struggling in this position, Ward was sat out for the third game of the season. Shortly after returning to the Canucks' lineup, Ward was suspended for three games and fined $500 for illegially checking Gary Roberts. Following the suspension, Ward was deployed as a centreman for the Canucks' fourth line to replace an injured player. He was eventually rotated back into a top-six role at the end of October after Pavel Bure suffered a groin injury. Ward's continued struggles in his sophomore season resulted in a mid-season trade to the Los Angeles Kings. Before the start of the 1994–95 season, Ward was traded to the Toronto Maple Leafs.

== Post-playing career ==
As of 2010, Ward is a VP with the Okanagan Hockey School in Penticton, BC.

== Awards and honors ==
| Award | Year | Ref |
|---|---|---|
| All-WCHA Second Team | 1990–91 | |
| All-WCHA Second Team | 1991–92 | |
| Jack A. Butterfield Trophy | 1995–96 | |
| Calder Cup (Rochester Americans) | 1995–96 | |

== Career statistics ==
| | | | Regular season | | | | | Playoffs |
| Season | Team | League | GP | G | A | Pts | PIM | GP | G | A | Pts | PIM |
|---|---|---|---|---|---|---|---|---|---|---|---|---|
| 1986–87 | Red Deer Rustlers | AJHL | 59 | 46 | 40 | 86 | 153 | 20 | 11 | 11 | 22 | 16 |
| 1987–88 | Red Deer Rustlers | AJHL | 51 | 60 | 71 | 131 | 167 | — | — | — | — | — |
| 1988–89 | University of North Dakota | WCHA | 37 | 8 | 9 | 17 | 26 | — | — | — | — | — |
| 1989–90 | University of North Dakota | WCHA | 45 | 35 | 34 | 69 | 44 | — | — | — | — | — |
| 1990–91 | University of North Dakota | WCHA | 43 | 34 | 35 | 69 | 84 | — | — | — | — | — |
| 1991–92 | University of North Dakota | WCHA | 38 | 33 | 31 | 64 | 90 | — | — | — | — | — |
| 1992–93 | Vancouver Canucks | NHL | 70 | 22 | 30 | 52 | 82 | 9 | 2 | 3 | 5 | 0 |
| 1993–94 | Vancouver Canucks | NHL | 33 | 6 | 1 | 7 | 37 | — | — | — | — | — |
| 1993–94 | Los Angeles Kings | NHL | 34 | 6 | 2 | 8 | 45 | — | — | — | — | — |
| 1994–95 | Toronto Maple Leafs | NHL | 22 | 0 | 3 | 3 | 31 | — | — | — | — | — |
| 1994–95 | St. John's Maple Leafs | AHL | 6 | 3 | 3 | 6 | 19 | — | — | — | — | — |
| 1994–95 | Detroit Vipers | IHL | 7 | 3 | 6 | 9 | 7 | 5 | 3 | 0 | 3 | 7 |
| 1995–96 | Buffalo Sabres | NHL | 8 | 2 | 2 | 4 | 6 | — | — | — | — | — |
| 1995–96 | Rochester Americans | AHL | 71 | 38 | 56 | 94 | 74 | 19 | 11 | 24 | 35 | 8 |
| 1996–97 | Buffalo Sabres | NHL | 79 | 13 | 32 | 45 | 36 | 12 | 2 | 3 | 5 | 6 |
| 1997–98 | Buffalo Sabres | NHL | 71 | 10 | 13 | 23 | 42 | 15 | 3 | 8 | 11 | 6 |
| 1998–99 | Buffalo Sabres | NHL | 78 | 20 | 24 | 44 | 44 | 21 | 7 | 5 | 12 | 32 |
| 1999–2000 | Buffalo Sabres | NHL | 71 | 11 | 9 | 20 | 41 | 5 | 0 | 1 | 1 | 2 |
| 2000–01 | Boston Bruins | NHL | 63 | 5 | 13 | 18 | 65 | — | — | — | — | — |
| 2001–02 | SC Langnau | NLA | 23 | 8 | 19 | 27 | 38 | — | — | — | — | — |
| 2002–03 | New York Rangers | NHL | 8 | 0 | 0 | 0 | 2 | — | — | — | — | — |
| 2002–03 | Hartford Wolf Pack | AHL | 67 | 23 | 41 | 64 | 108 | — | — | — | — | — |
| 2003–04 | SC Rapperswil–Jona | NLA | 35 | 22 | 11 | 33 | 44 | — | — | — | — | — |
| NHL totals | | | 537 | 95 | 129 | 224 | 431 | 62 | 14 | 20 | 34 | 46 |

| Preceded by Corey Schwab | Winner of the Jack A. Butterfield Trophy; 1995–96 | Succeeded by Mike McHugh |
