= Eric Lacroix =

Canadian ice hockey player (born 1971)

- Born: July 15, 1971 (age 55) Montreal, Quebec, Canada
- Height: 6 ft 1 in (185 cm)
- Weight: 205 lb (93 kg; 14 st 9 lb)
- Position: Left wing
- Shot: Left
- Played for: Toronto Maple Leafs; Los Angeles Kings; Colorado Avalanche; New York Rangers; Ottawa Senators
- NHL draft: 136th overall, 1990; Toronto Maple Leafs
- Playing career: 1992–2001

Eric Lacroix (born July 15, 1971) is a Canadian former professional ice hockey player. He played eight seasons in the National Hockey League (NHL) for the Toronto Maple Leafs, Los Angeles Kings, Colorado Avalanche, New York Rangers and Ottawa Senators. He is the son of former Colorado Avalanche president Pierre Lacroix, and has worked in various management positions within the Avalanche. He is currently an analyst for the DNVR Avalanche podcast.

== Playing career ==
Lacroix was selected in the 7th round, 136th overall in the 1990 NHL entry draft by the Toronto Maple Leafs. He then played two years of collegiate hockey with St. Lawrence University of the ECAC. He made his professional debut with Maple Leafs American Hockey League affiliate, the St. John's Maple Leafs before appearing in his first NHL game with the Leafs in the 1993–94 season.

Lacroix enjoyed his most successful stint in the NHL with the Colorado Avalanche, posting a career high 18 goals, 18 assists and 36 points in the 1996–97 season, as the Avalanche fell just short of defending their Stanley Cup title.

On February 13, 1999, Lacroix was traded from the Los Angeles Kings to the Rangers for Sean Pronger. On March 1, 2001, he was traded from the Rangers to the Senators for Colin Forbes before ending his professional career at 472 NHL games after the conclusion of the 2000–01 season.

== Management ==
Post-retirement, Lacroix remained involved in hockey and returned to the Avalanche organization, assuming the roles of assistant video coach and director of hockey operations for four seasons. He became the co-owner and governor of the Arizona Sundogs of the Central Hockey League. After three years with the Sundogs, helping claim the Ray Miron President's Cup as champions of the CHL, Lacroix joined the Phoenix Coyotes organization for the 2008–09 season as a professional scout.

On June 3, 2009, Lacroix re-joined his father in Colorado, when he was named Vice President of Hockey Operations for the Avalanche. He served in his role for four consecutive seasons, before leaving after the 2012–13 season.

== Broadcasting ==
It was announced on September 18, 2017, that Lacroix had signed on to be a studio analyst for the Vegas Golden Knights on AT&T SportsNet Rocky Mountain.

== Personal life ==
Lacroix is married to Jill and they have three children, Max, Mia, and Ty. They live in Castle Pines, Colorado.

Max Lacroix, who is a goalie and will play for the Colorado Grit in the NAHL during the 2023–24 season, is committed to Boston University for the 2024–25 season.

== Career statistics ==
			Regular season					Playoffs
Season	Team	League	GP	G	A	Pts	PIM	GP	G	A	Pts	PIM
1989–90	The Governor's Academy	HS-MA	25	23	18	41	—	—	—	—	—	—
1990–91	St. Lawrence University	ECAC	30	12	7	19	35	—	—	—	—	—
1991–92	St. Lawrence University	ECAC	34	11	21	32	40	—	—	—	—	—
1992–93	St. John's Maple Leafs	AHL	76	15	19	34	59	9	5	3	8	4
1993–94	St. John's Maple Leafs	AHL	59	17	22	39	69	11	5	3	8	6
1993–94	Toronto Maple Leafs	NHL	3	0	0	0	2	2	0	0	0	0
1994–95	St. John's Maple Leafs	AHL	1	0	0	0	2	—	—	—	—	—
1994–95	Phoenix Roadrunners	IHL	25	7	1	8	31	—	—	—	—	—
1994–95	Los Angeles Kings	NHL	45	9	7	16	54	—	—	—	—	—
1995–96	Los Angeles Kings	NHL	72	16	16	32	110	—	—	—	—	—
1996–97	Colorado Avalanche	NHL	81	18	18	36	26	17	1	4	5	19
1997–98	Colorado Avalanche	NHL	82	16	15	31	84	7	0	0	0	6
1998–99	Colorado Avalanche	NHL	7	0	0	0	2	—	—	—	—	—
1998–99	Los Angeles Kings	NHL	27	0	1	1	12	—	—	—	—	—
1998–99	New York Rangers	NHL	30	2	1	3	4	—	—	—	—	—
1999–00	New York Rangers	NHL	70	4	8	12	24	—	—	—	—	—
2000–01	New York Rangers	NHL	46	2	3	5	39	—	—	—	—	—
2000–01	Ottawa Senators	NHL	9	0	1	1	4	4	0	1	1	0
NHL totals			472	67	70	137	361	30	1	5	6	25

== Awards and honors ==
Award	Year
All-ECAC Hockey Rookie Team	1990–91

== See also ==
- List of family relations in the National Hockey League
