= Guy Leveque =

Canadian ice hockey player

- Born: 28 December 1972 Kingston, Ontario, Canada
- Died: 27 September 2005 (aged 32) St. Catharines, Ontario, Canada
- Height: 5 ft 11 in (180 cm)
- Weight: 161 lb (73 kg; 11 st 7 lb)
- Position: Center
- Shot: Right
- Played for: Los Angeles Kings
- NHL draft: 42nd overall, 1991; Los Angeles Kings
- Playing career: 1992–1998

Guy Scott Leveque (December 28, 1972 – September 27, 2005) was a Canadian professional ice hockey centre. He played 17 games in the National Hockey League with the Los Angeles Kings during the 1992–93 and 1993–94 seasons.

== Playing career ==
Leveque played for the Cornwall Royals of the Ontario Hockey League from 1989 until 1992. He was drafted 42nd overall in the second round of the 1991 NHL entry draft by the Los Angeles Kings. Leveque split 1992–93 and 1993–94 between the Kings and the IHL's Phoenix Roadrunners. He spent much of 1994–95 with the Canada national men's ice hockey team, but also spent some time with the Roadrunners and the St. John's Maple Leafs of the American Hockey League. He spent the entire 1995–96 season with the Manitoba Moose, the 1996–97 season with the San Antonio Dragons, and 1997–98 with the Phoenix Mustangs of the West Coast Hockey League before finally retiring from professional hockey.

Leveque was a member of the Los Angeles Kings during the 1993 Stanley Cup Playoffs. Led by Wayne Gretzky, the Kings made the final against the Montreal Canadiens. Leveque was forced to sit out the final with an injury.

== Death ==
Leveque was found drowned to death in a pool of water in St. Catharines, Ontario on October 2, 2005. Police estimated his date of death as September 27. Police have remained baffled by the death, but it was known by family that Leveque suffered from an OxyContin addiction that developed through usage for back pain that had plagued him since junior hockey and that he suffered from bouts with depression.

== Career statistics ==
=== Regular season and playoffs ===
			Regular season					Playoffs
Season	Team	League	GP	G	A	Pts	PIM	GP	G	A	Pts	PIM
1988–89	Kingston Lions U18	U18 AAA	47	55	29	84	52	—	—	—	—	—
1989–90	Cornwall Royals	OHL	62	10	15	25	30	3	0	0	0	4
1990–91	Cornwall Royals	OHL	66	41	52	93	34	—	—	—	—	—
1991–92	Cornwall Royals	OHL	37	23	36	59	40	6	3	5	8	2
1992–93	Los Angeles Kings	NHL	12	2	1	3	19	—	—	—	—	—
1992–93	Phoenix Roadrunners	IHL	56	27	30	57	71	—	—	—	—	—
1993–94	Los Angeles Kings	NHL	5	0	1	1	2	—	—	—	—	—
1993–94	Phoenix Roadrunners	IHL	39	10	16	26	47	—	—	—	—	—
1994–95	Phoenix Roadrunners	IHL	2	0	0	0	15	—	—	—	—	—
1994–95	St. John's Maple Leafs	AHL	37	8	14	22	31	3	0	0	0	0
1994–95	Canadian National Team	Intl	31	17	17	34	14	—	—	—	—	—
1995–96	Minnesota Moose	IHL	12	1	4	5	2	—	—	—	—	—
1996–97	San Antonio Dragons	IHL	3	0	1	1	0	—	—	—	—	—
1997–98	Phoenix Mustangs	WCHL	48	24	32	56	41	6	2	3	5	2
IHL totals			112	38	51	89	135	—	—	—	—	—
NHL totals			17	2	2	4	21	—	—	—	—	—
