= Chris Snell =

Canadian ice hockey player and scout

- Born: May 12, 1971 (age 54) Regina, Saskatchewan, Canada
- Height: 5 ft 11 in (180 cm)
- Weight: 184 lb (83 kg; 13 st 2 lb)
- Position: Defence
- Shot: Left
- Played for: Toronto Maple Leafs; Los Angeles Kings
- NHL draft: 145th overall, 1991; Buffalo Sabres
- Playing career: 1991–2003

Chris Snell (born May 12, 1971) is a Canadian former professional ice hockey defenceman and an amateur scout (Ontario Hockey League) of the Winnipeg Jets. He was drafted in the seventh round, 145th overall, by the Buffalo Sabres in the 1991 NHL entry draft.

== Playing career ==
As a youth, he played in the 1984 Quebec International Pee-Wee Hockey Tournament with a minor ice hockey team from Oshawa.

Snell played in the Oshawa Kiwanis Minor Hockey program in the OMHA and was a member of the 1987–88 All-Ontario Midget Championship team.

He was drafted in the 4th round (57th overall) in the 1988 OHL Priority Selection by the Ottawa 67's where he played for legendary coach Brian Kilrea.

He was a member of the Team Canada Under-20 1990 World Junior Championship team that captured a gold medal in 1991.

He played in thirty-four games in the National Hockey League: two with the Toronto Maple Leafs in 1993–94 and thirty-two with the Los Angeles Kings in 1994–95. During the 1994–95 season, he was the only defenceman to score two shorthanded goals.

He finished his playing career spending six seasons in the DEL (Deutsche Eishockey Liga) in Germany from 1997 to 2003. He retired from active playing in the summer of 2003.

== Career statistics ==
=== Regular season and playoffs ===
			Regular season					Playoffs
Season	Team	League	GP	G	A	Pts	PIM	GP	G	A	Pts	PIM
1987–88	Oshawa Kiwanis	Midget	79	21	67	88	113	—	—	—	—	—
1988–89	Ottawa 67's	OHL	66	11	48	59	16	11	3	5	8	0
1989–90	Ottawa 67's	OHL	63	18	62	80	36	3	2	4	6	4
1990–91	Ottawa 67's	OHL	54	23	59	82	58	17	3	14	17	8
1991–92	Rochester Americans	AHL	65	5	27	32	66	10	2	1	3	6
1992–93	Rochester Americans	AHL	76	14	57	71	83	17	5	8	13	39
1993–94	Toronto Maple Leafs	NHL	2	0	0	0	2	—	—	—	—	—
1993–94	St. John's Maple Leafs	AHL	75	22	74	96	92	11	1	15	16	10
1994–95	Phoenix Roadrunners	IHL	57	15	49	64	122	—	—	—	—	—
1994–95	Los Angeles Kings	NHL	32	2	7	9	22	—	—	—	—	—
1995–96	Phoenix Roadrunners	IHL	40	9	22	31	113	—	—	—	—	—
1995–96	Binghamton Rangers	AHL	32	7	25	32	48	4	2	2	4	6
1996–97	Indianapolis Ice	IHL	73	22	45	67	130	2	0	0	0	2
1997–98	Frankfurt Lions	DEL	45	13	26	39	161	7	3	2	5	22
1998–99	Frankfurt Lions	DEL	49	22	29	51	157	8	2	4	6	6
1999–2000	Frankfurt Lions	DEL	50	5	19	24	117	—	—	—	—	—
2000–01	Hannover Scorpions	DEL	50	8	17	25	76	6	0	2	2	14
2001–02	Frankfurt Lions	DEL	54	15	26	41	100	—	—	—	—	—
2002–03	Frankfurt Lions	DEL	46	9	22	31	132	—	—	—	—	—
AHL totals			248	48	183	231	289	42	10	26	36	61
IHL totals			170	46	116	162	365	2	0	0	0	2
DEL totals			294	72	139	211	743	21	5	8	13	42

=== International ===
Year	Team	Event	GP	G	A	Pts	PIM
1991	Canada	WJC	7	0	4	4	0
