= List of career achievements by Wayne Gretzky =

Details of all-time NHL ice hockey record holder

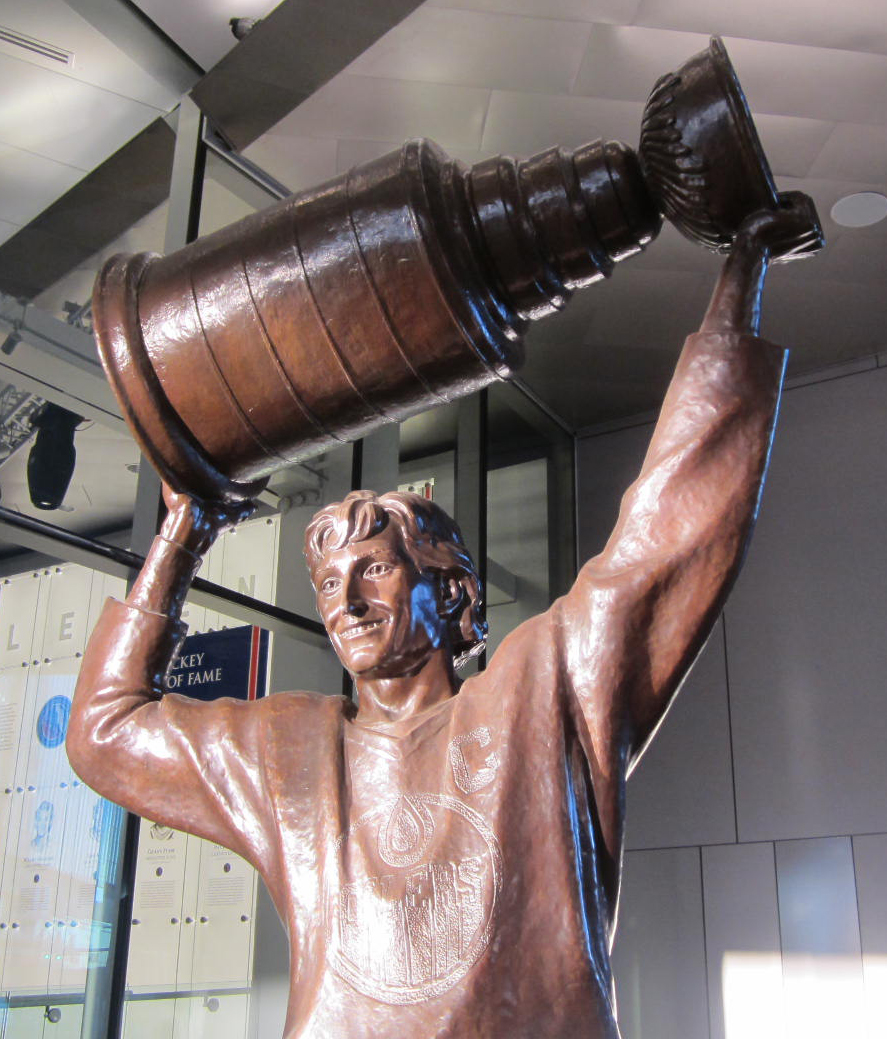
Gretzky's statue at Rogers Place, Edmonton

Upon his retirement on April 18, 1999, Wayne Gretzky was credited by the National Hockey League (NHL) Record Book with holding or sharing 61 NHL records, including 40 regular season, 15 playoff and 6 All-Star records. As of completion of the 2024–25 season, more than a quarter century after retirement, he still holds or shares 55 of those NHL records. His #99 jersey was retired league wide by the NHL on February 6, 2000.

Winning four Stanley Cup titles (1984, 1985, 1987, 1988), Gretzky set records in both regular season and post-season play, including regular season goals (894), assists (1,963), points (2,857), and hat-tricks (50). The next closest player in total points for the regular season is Jaromir Jagr at 1,921, thus Gretzky has more career assists than any other player has total points. On April 6, 2025, 26 years after Gretzky scored his last regular season goal, Alexander Ovechkin broke Gretzky's record for most regular season goals.

Gretzky scored his first 1,000 points faster (424 games) than any other player in NHL history, and scored the second 1,000 faster (433 games) than any player other than himself. His point total including regular season and playoffs stands at an imposing 3,239 (1,016 goals, 2,223 assists).

Gretzky still maintains the record for the most career playoff goals (122), assists (260), points (382), hat-tricks (10) and game-winning goals (24). His 47 playoff points in 1985 are still the most for a single postseason. His record of 31 playoff assists in a single postseason held for 36 years before being broken by Connor McDavid in game four of the 2024 Stanley Cup Final.

== Official record list ==
The following is a list of official records Gretzky held or shared at his retirement on April 18, 1999.

=== Regular season records (40) ===
1. Most goals: 894 in 1,487 games (since broken by Alexander Ovechkin)
2. Most goals, including playoffs: 1,016 in 1,487 regular season games including 122 playoff goals
3. Most goals, one season: 92 in 1981–82, 80-game schedule
4. Most goals, one season, including playoffs: 100 in 1983–84, 87 goals in 74 regular season games and 13 goals in 19 playoff games
5. Most goals, 50 games from start of season: 61 in 1981–82 (October 7 to January 22, 80-game schedule) and 1983–84 (October 5 to January 25), 80-game schedule
6. Most goals, one period: 4 (tied with ten other players) February 18, 1981
7. Most assists: 1,963
8. Most assists, including playoffs: 2,223
9. Most assists, one season: 163 in 1985–86, 80-game schedule
10. Most assists, one season, including playoffs: 174 in 1985–86, 163 assists in 80 regular season games and 11 assists in 10 playoff games
11. Most assists, one game: 7 (tied with Billy "The Kid" Taylor) February 16, 1980; December 11, 1985; February 15, 1986
12. Most assists, one road game: 7 (tied with Billy "The Kid" Taylor) December 11, 1985
13. Most points: 2,857 in 1,487 games (894 goals, 1,963 assists)
14. Most points, including playoffs: 3,239 in 1,487 regular season and 208 playoff games. (1,016 goals, 2,223 assists)
15. Most points, one season: 215 in 1985–86, 80-game schedule (52 goals, 163 assists)
16. Most points, one season, including playoffs: 255 in 1984–85; 208 points in 80 regular season games and 47 points in 18 playoff games
17. Most shorthanded goals, career: 73
18. Most overtime assists, career: 13 (Broken by over 40 players)
19. Most goals by a centre, career: 894
20. Most goals by a centre, one season: 92 in 1981–82, 80-game schedule
21. Most assists by a centre, career: 1,963
22. Most assists by a centre, one season: 163 in 1985–86, 80-game schedule
23. Most points by a centre, career: 2,857
24. Most points by a centre, one season: 215 in 1985–86, 80-game schedule
25. Highest goals-per-game average, one season (among players with 50-or-more goals): 1.18 in 1983–84, 87 goals in 74 games
26. Highest assists-per-game average, career (300 min.): 1.321 -- 1,963 assists in 1,487 games
27. Highest assists-per-game average, one season: 2.04 in 1985–86, 163 assists in 80 games
28. Highest points-per-game average, one season (among players with 50-or-more points): 2.77 in 1983–84, 205 points in 74 games
29. Most 40-or-more goal seasons: 12 in 20 seasons (Broken by Alexander Ovechkin in 2023)
30. Most consecutive 40-or-more goal seasons: 12 from 1979–80 to 1990–91
31. Most 50-or-more goal seasons: 9 (tied with Mike Bossy and Alex Ovechkin)
32. Most 60-or-more goal seasons: 5 (tied with Mike Bossy)
33. Most consecutive 60-or-more goals seasons: 4 from 1981–82 to 1984–85
34. Most 100-or-more point seasons: 15
35. Most consecutive 100-or-more point seasons: 13 from 1979–80 to 1991–92
36. Most three-or-more goal games, career: 50 — 37 three-goal (hat trick) games; nine four-goal games; four five-goal games
37. Most three goal games, one season: 10, in 1981–82 and 1983–84
38. Longest consecutive assist scoring streak: 23 games in 1990–91, 48 assists
39. Longest consecutive point-scoring streak: 51 games in 1983–84 (October 5 to January 28, 61 goals, 92 assists for 153 points)
40. Longest consecutive point-scoring streak from start of season: 51 in 1983–84; 61 goals, 92 assists for 153 points (October 5 to January 28)

=== Playoff records (15) ===
1. Most playoff goals, career: 122
2. Most playoff assists, career: 260
3. Most assists, one playoff year: 31 in 1988 (19 games) (Since broken by Connor McDavid)
4. Most assists in one series: 14 (at the time tied with Rick Middleton and since broken by Leon Draisaitl) in 1985 Conference Finals (six games vs. Chicago)
5. Most assists in final series: 10 in 1988 (four games, plus suspended game vs. Boston)
6. Most assists, one playoff game: 6 (tied with Mikko Leinonen) on April 9, 1987
7. Most assists, one playoff period: 3 — Three assists by one player in one period of a playoff game has been recorded on 70 occasions, five of them by Gretzky
8. Most points, career: 382
9. Most points, one playoff year: 47 in 1985 (17 goals and 30 assists in 18 games)
10. Most points in final series: 13 in 1988 three goals and 10 assists (four games plus suspended game vs. Boston, three goals)
11. Most points, one playoff period: 4 (tied with nine other players)
12. Most short-handed goals, one playoff year: 3 (tied with five other players) 1983
13. Most short-handed goals, one playoff game: 2 (tied with eight other players) April 9, 1983
14. Most game-winning goals in playoffs, career: 24 (tied with Brett Hull)
15. Most three-or-more goals games (hat trick): 10 (eight three-goal games, two four-goal games)

=== All-Star records (6) ===
1. Most All-Star game goals, career: 13 (in 18 games played)
2. Most All-Star game goals, one game: 4 (tied with three players) 1983 Campbell Conference
3. Most All-Star game goals, one period: 4 1983 Campbell Conference, third period
4. Most All-Star game assists, career: 12 (tied with four others)
5. Most All-Star game points, career: 25 (13 goals, 12 assists in 18 games)
6. Most All-Star game points, one period: 4 (tied with Mike Gartner and Adam Oates) 1983 Campbell Conference, third period (four goals)

== Record updates ==
Since Gretzky's retirement, six of his records have been broken, and he has gained one. The current NHL Record Book also now recognizes additional records held by Gretzky.

=== Broken ===
- Gretzky's record of 15 regular season overtime assists has now been surpassed by over 40 players. Regular season overtime was not introduced until his fifth season in the NHL, and was played 5-on-5 during his tenure; after he retired, in a successful effort to increase scoring in overtime, the league changed the rule to 4-on-4, and later to 3-on-3. Patrick Kane is the current record holder at 26 assists in regular season overtime.
- Joe Sakic (16), Mark Messier (14), and Ray Bourque (13) have passed Gretzky's record (12) for most All-Star game assists.
- In the second round of the 2022 Stanley Cup playoffs, Leon Draisaitl recorded 15 assists to break Gretzky's record of 14.
- On March 21, 2023, Alexander Ovechkin broke Gretzky's record for most 40-or-more goal seasons, with his 13th.
- On June 15, 2024, Connor McDavid recorded his 32nd assist in his 22nd game of the 2024 playoffs to break Gretzky's record of 31 assists in a playoff year. McDavid finished the 2024 playoffs with 34 assists in 24 games.
- On April 6, 2025, Alexander Ovechkin scored his 895th career goal to break Gretzky's 31-year-old record of 894.

=== Set ===
Gretzky finished his career with a 1.921 points per game average. At the time, Mario Lemieux held the record at 2.005. After Lemieux returned to the NHL, from 2000 to 2005, his average fell to second place, and Gretzky became the record holder.

=== Retroactively recognized ===
- Most 3-point games, season: 40
- Most 5-point games, season: 15
- Most multi-point games, career: 824
- Most 3-goal games, season: 10
- Most multi-goal games, career: 189
- Most 2-assist games, season: 44
- Most 3-assist games, season: 27
- Most 4-assist games, season: 12
- Most 5-assist games, season: 4
- Most multi-assist games, career: 575

== Unofficial records ==
Along with his numerous official records, Wayne Gretzky also has over 100 "unofficial" ones. These other records — though not recognized by the 1999 NHL Official Guide and Record Book — are still significant.

=== NHL scoring ===
- Youngest player to score 50 goals in a season (19 years, two months)
- Most points by an NHL player in his first year: 137. Because of Gretzky's season played in the WHA, the then-19-year-old was not considered a rookie when he finished his first year, so the rookie record belongs to Teemu Selanne, who had played for two seasons in the top professional league in Finland, achieved 132 NHL points as a 22-year-old.
- Most assists by an NHL player in his first year: 86. The rookie record is held jointly by Peter Stastny and Joe Juneau with 70 assists. Note that the record book gives Gretzky the record for most assists and points in a game as a first year player, but there is no official record for the season totals.
- Most 200-or-more point seasons: 4. In addition to holding the official record for most 100 point seasons, Gretzky is the only player to reach 200 points in a season.
- Most consecutive 200 point seasons: 3
- Most 70-or-more goal seasons: 4. The NHL has a record for most 60 goal seasons, but not 70. Eight players have achieved 70 goals, and Brett Hull did so three times.
- Most consecutive 70 goal seasons: 4
- Most 80-or-more goal seasons: 2
- Most 90-or-more goal seasons: 1. Gretzky is the only player to achieve this.
- Fastest 50 goals from start of season: 50 goals in 39 games. While not an official record, the mark of 50 goals in 50 games is a celebrated and rare event, achieved by only five players. The quickest, 50 goals in 39 games, is often labelled as the most difficult one to break of all of Gretzky's records – official or otherwise. The NHL has an official record for the most goals in first 50 games (held, and later repeated, by Gretzky, with 61 goals), but not the fastest to 50 goals.
- Fastest 100 points: 34 games in 1983–84
- Most seasons averaging at least 1 point per game: 19 (surpassed by Sidney Crosby in the 2024–25 season)
- Most consecutive seasons averaging at least 1 point per game: 19 (surpassed by Sidney Crosby in the 2024–2025 season)
- Most seasons averaging at least 2 points per game: 10
- Most consecutive seasons averaging at least 2 points per game: 9
- Most game-winning goals in the playoffs: 24 (tied with Brett Hull)
- Most game-winning assists in one season: 23
- Most game-winning assists in regular season career: 234
- Most game-winning points in regular season career: 325
- Highest career game-winning points per game average: 0.2185
- Most 100-or-more assist seasons: 11
- Most consecutive 100-or-more assist seasons: 11
- Most seasons leading in even strength goals: 4
- Most career even strength goals: 617
- Most seasons leading in short-handed goals: 5
- Most seasons leading in assists: 16
- Most seasons leading in points: 11
- Most seasons leading in both goals and assists: 5 (this was only achieved 7 other times in history, with Gordie Howe (2) and Mario Lemieux (2) accounting for 4 of those other occurrences).
- Most seasons leading the league in goals, assists and plus/minus: 4 (no other player has done this, although plus/minus was only counted since 1967).
- Most seasons leading in goals created: 7
- Most seasons leading in assists per game: 12
- Most seasons leading in points per game: 11
- Most seasons leading in total goals on-ice for: 8
- Most short-handed regular season career goals: 73
- Most short-handed goals career (regular season and playoffs) : 85
- Most 10+ shorthanded goals in a season : 2
- Most shorthanded assists career (regular season) : 76
- Most shorthanded assists career (playoffs) : 13
- Most shorthanded assists career (regular season and playoffs) : 89
- Most shorthanded points career (regular season) : 149
- Most shorthanded points career (playoffs) : 24
- Most shorthanded points career (regular season and playoffs) : 173
- Most scoring championships (Art Ross Trophy): 10
- Largest margin of victory in the scoring race: 79 (in 1983–84)
- Most seasons where he was his team's leading scorer: 19
- Highest plus/minus in a single playoff year: +28 (1984–85)
- Highest plus/minus by a forward, single season: +100 (1984–85)
- Highest plus/minus by a forward, career: +520
- Highest plus/minus by a centre in playoff career: +67
- Most MVP awards (Hart Memorial Trophy): 9
- Most trophies in career: 31
- Latest goal in a regulation period: 0:01 seconds left
- Longest consecutive assist scoring streak from start of season: 12 (1982–83) — since broken by Connor McDavid in 2026
- Most official NHL records: 61 on retirement, 57 at present (As of September 2024, 24 years after his last game)

=== Major league scoring ===
- Most NHL and WHA regular season assists: 2,027 — Gretzky's 1,384th career assist occurred on November 2, 1990, in Washington's 4–3 win over the Kings, breaking the record held by Gordie Howe.
- Most NHL and WHA regular season points: 2,967 — Gretzky broke the record held by Gordie Howe on March 9, 1992, with an assist on a first period goal by Tony Granato to make the game score Los Angeles 2, Toronto 0 (final was 4–1). It was his 2,359th career point on 1,567 assists and 792 goals.
- Most NHL and WHA goals, regular season (940) and playoff (132): 1,072 (one more than Gordie Howe), with Gretzky's final goal on March 29, 1999, being the game-winner with 2:07 remaining in the Rangers' 3–1 win over the New York Islanders
- Most NHL and WHA regular season and playoff assists: 2,297
- Most NHL and WHA regular season and playoff points: 3,369

=== Milestones ===
Source: Big Mouth Sports

The following are NHL milestone records:

- Only player to reach 2,000 career points
- Only player to reach 3,000 career points, regular season and playoffs combined
- First player to reach 1,000 career goals, regular season and playoffs combined
- Only player to reach 2,000 career assists, regular season and playoffs combined

==== Goals ====
- Youngest to score 100 goals (20 years, 40 days) (March 15, 1981)
- Fastest and youngest to 200 goals (242 games)- modern record, Cy Denneny scored 200 goals in 181 games (21 years, 256 days) (October 9, 1982)
- Fastest and youngest to 300 goals (350 games), (22 years, 321 days) (December 13, 1983)
- Fastest and youngest to 400 goals (436 games), (23 years, 352 days) (January 13, 1985)
- Fastest and youngest to 500 goals (575 games), (25 years, 299 days) (November 22, 1986)
- Fastest and youngest to 600 goals (718 games, one fewer than Mario Lemieux), (27 years, 302 days) (November 23, 1988)
- Fastest and youngest to 700 goals (886 games), (29 years, 342 days) (January 3, 1991)
- Fastest and youngest to 800 goals (1116 games), (33 years, 53 days) (March 20, 1994)

==== Assists ====
- Fastest to 100 assists (92 games) (November 7, 1980)
- Fastest and youngest to 200 assists (165 games), (20 years 264 days) (October 18, 1981)
- Fastest and youngest to 300 assists (229 games), (21 years 43 days) (March 13, 1982)
- Fastest and youngest to 400 assists (290 games), (21 years 362 days) (January 23, 1983)
- Fastest and youngest to 500 assists (352 games), (22 years 325 days) (December 17, 1983)
- Fastest and youngest to 600 assists (416 games), (23 years 307 days) (November 29, 1984)
- Fastest and youngest to 700 assists (478 games), (24 years 267 days) (October 20, 1985)
- Fastest and youngest to 800 assists (527 games), (25 years 11 days) (February 8, 1986)
- Fastest and youngest to 900 assists (584 games), (25 years 320 days) (December 12, 1986)
- Fastest and youngest to 1,000 assists (645 games), (26 years 282 days) (November 4, 1987)
- Fastest and youngest to 1,100 assists (706 games), (27 years 276 days) (October 28, 1988)
- Fastest and youngest to 1,200 assists (774 games), (28 years 65 days) (April 1, 1989)
- Fastest, youngest, and only one to 1,300 assists (846 games), (29 years 50 days) (March 17, 1990)

==== Points ====
- Fastest to 200 points (117 games)
- Fastest and youngest to 300 points (159 games), (20 years, 67 days)
- Fastest and youngest to 400 points (197 games), (20 years, 335 days)
- Fastest and youngest to 500 points (234 games), (21 years, 52 days)
- Fastest and youngest to 600 points (274 games), (21 years, 330 days)
- Fastest and youngest to 700 points (317 games), (22 years, 62 days)
- Fastest and youngest to 800 points (352 games), (22 years, 325 days)
- Fastest and youngest to 900 points (385 games), (23 years, 47 days)
- Fastest and youngest to 1,000 points (424 games), (23 years, 328 days)
- Fastest and youngest to 1,100 points (464 games), (24 years, 50 days)
- Fastest and youngest to 1,200 points (504 games), (24 years, 321 days)
- Fastest and youngest to 1,300 points (539 games), (25 years, 38 days)
- Fastest and youngest to 1,400 points (580 games), (25 years, 313 days)
- Fastest and youngest to 1,500 points (620 games), (26 years, 44 days)
- Fastest and youngest to 1,600 points (667 games), (26 years, 330 days)
- Fastest and youngest to 1,700 points (711 games), (27 years, 285 days)
- Fastest and youngest to 1,800 points (754 games), (28 years, 23 days)
- Fastest and youngest to 1,900 points (803 games), (28 years, 318 days)
- Fastest, youngest, and only one to 2,000 points (857 games), (29 years, 273 days)

== Career statistics ==
Bold denotes career high

			Regular season									Playoffs
Season	Team	League	GP	G	A	Pts	PIM	+/-	PP	SH	GW	GP	G	A	Pts	PIM
1975–76	Toronto Nationals	MetJHL	28	27	33	60	7	—	—	—	—	—	—	—	—	—
1976–77	Seneca Nationals	MetJHL	32	36	36	72	35	—	—	—	—	23	40	35	75	—
1976–77	Peterborough Petes	OMJHL	3	0	3	3	0	—	—	—	—	—	—	—	—	—
1977–78	Sault Ste. Marie Greyhounds	OMJHL	64	70	112	182	14	—	—	—	—	13	6	20	26	0
1978–79	Indianapolis Racers	WHA	8	3	3	6	0	-3	0	—	—	—	—	—	—	—
1978–79	Edmonton Oilers	WHA	72	43	61	104	19	+23	9	—	—	13	10	10	20	2
1979–80	Edmonton Oilers	NHL	79	51	86	137	21	+15	13	1	6	3	2	1	3	0
1980–81	Edmonton Oilers	NHL	80	55	109	164	28	+41	15	4	3	9	7	14	21	4
1981–82	Edmonton Oilers	NHL	80	**92**	120	212	26	+81	18	6	12	5	5	7	12	8
1982–83	Edmonton Oilers	NHL	80	71	125	196	59	+60	18	6	9	16	12	26	38	4
1983–84	Edmonton Oilers	NHL	74	87	118	205	39	+76	20	12	11	19	13	22	35	12
1984–85	Edmonton Oilers	NHL	80	73	135	208	52	+98	8	11	7	18	17	30	**47**	4
1985–86	Edmonton Oilers	NHL	80	52	**163**	**215**	46	+71	11	3	6	10	8	11	19	2
1986–87	Edmonton Oilers	NHL	79	62	121	183	28	+70	13	7	4	21	5	29	34	6
1987–88	Edmonton Oilers	NHL	64	40	109	149	24	+39	9	5	3	19	12	**31**	43	16
1988–89	Los Angeles Kings	NHL	78	54	114	168	26	+15	11	5	5	11	5	17	22	0
1989–90	Los Angeles Kings	NHL	73	40	102	142	42	+8	10	4	4	7	3	7	10	0
1990–91	Los Angeles Kings	NHL	78	41	122	163	16	+30	8	0	5	12	4	11	15	2
1991–92	Los Angeles Kings	NHL	74	31	90	121	34	-12	12	2	2	6	2	5	7	2
1992–93	Los Angeles Kings	NHL	45	16	49	65	6	+6	0	2	1	24	15	25	40	4
1993–94	Los Angeles Kings	NHL	81	38	92	130	20	-25	14	4	0	—	—	—	—	—
1994–95	Los Angeles Kings	NHL	48	11	37	48	6	-20	3	0	1	—	—	—	—	—
1995–96	Los Angeles Kings	NHL	62	15	66	81	32	-7	5	0	2	—	—	—	—	—
1995–96	St. Louis Blues	NHL	18	8	13	21	2	-6	1	1	1	13	2	14	16	0
1996–97	New York Rangers	NHL	82	25	72	97	28	+12	6	0	2	15	10	10	20	2
1997–98	New York Rangers	NHL	82	23	67	90	28	-11	6	0	4	—	—	—	—	—
1998–99	New York Rangers	NHL	70	9	53	62	14	-23	3	0	3	—	—	—	—	—
1 WHA season	Totals	WHA	80	46	64	110	19	+20	9	—	—	13	10	10	20	2
20 NHL seasons	Totals	NHL	1487	894	1963	2857	577	+518	204	73	91	208	122	260	382	66

== Awards ==
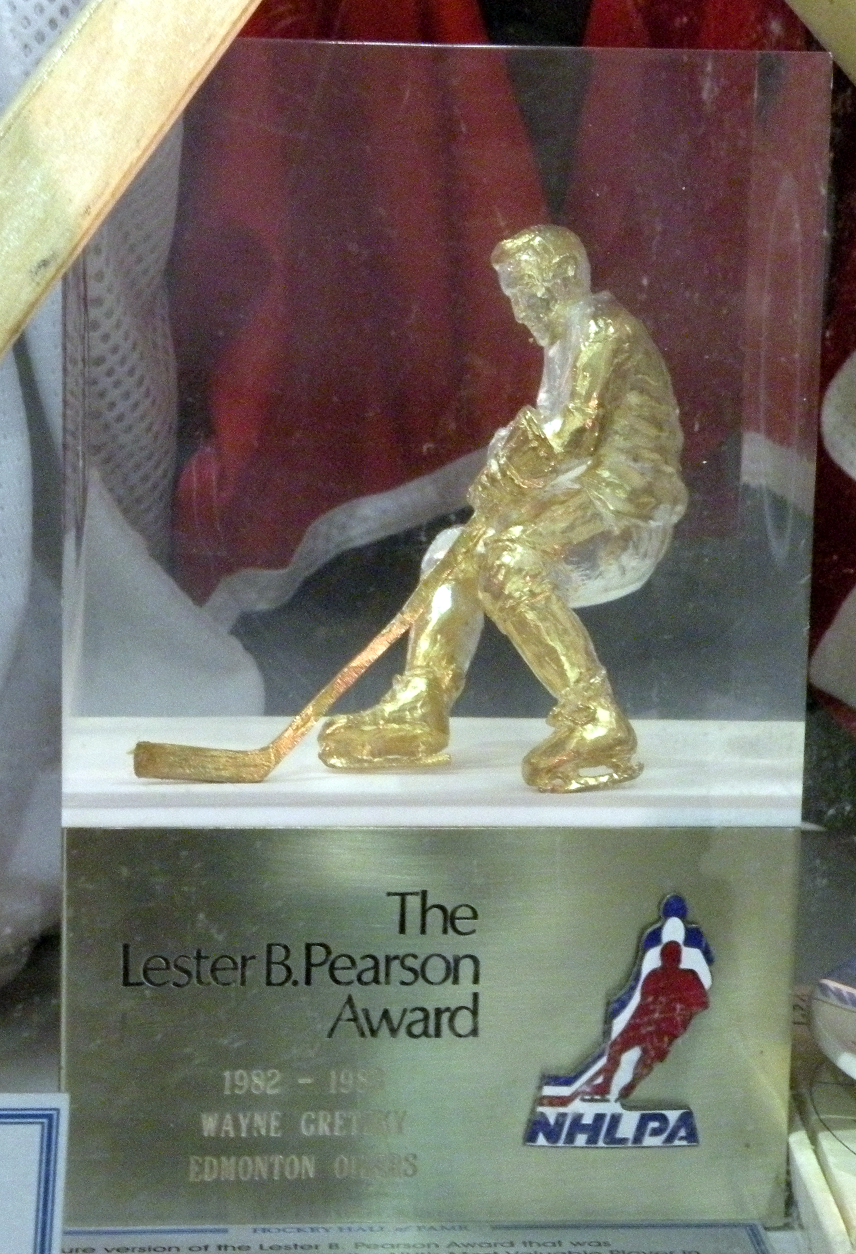
Replica of the Lester B. Pearson Award presented to Gretzky in 1982–83

He won nine Hart Trophies, the NHL's most valuable player award, and eight of these were awarded in consecutive years from 1980 to 1987. Gretzky holds the record for most MVP awards of any player in North American professional sports.

- Lou Kaplan Trophy (WHA rookie of the year) — 1979
- Molson Cup — 1980, 1981, 1982, 1983, 1984, 1985, 1986, 1987, 1988
- Hart Memorial Trophy (most valuable player) — 1980–87, 1989
- Art Ross Trophy (scoring champion) — 1981–87, 1990, 1991, 1994
- Charlie Conacher Humanitarian Award — 1980
- Zane Feldman Trophy — 1981, 1982, 1983, 1984, 1985, 1986, 1987, 1988
- Conn Smythe Trophy (playoff most valuable player) — 1985, 1988
- Lester B. Pearson Award (outstanding player, voted by the players) — 1982–85, 1987
- Lady Byng Memorial Trophy (sportsmanship) — 1980, 1991, 1992, 1994, 1999
- NHL Plus-Minus Award (best plus-minus rating; formerly Emery Edge Trophy) — 1984, 1985, 1987 (league leader in 1982 no award)
- Stanley Cup — 1984, 1985, 1987, 1988
- Canada Cup — 1984, 1987, 1991
- Chrysler-Dodge/NHL Performer of the Year — 1985, 1986, 1987
- Dodge/NHL Performance of the Year Trophy — 1989
- Bill Libby Memorial Award — 1989, 1990, 1991, 1994
- Los Angeles Kings Most Popular Player Award — 1989, 1994
- Los Angeles Kings Leading Scorer Award — 1989, 1990, 1991, 1992, 1994, 1995
- Lester Patrick Trophy (outstanding service to hockey in the United States) — 1994
- Lou Marsh Trophy (Canadian athlete of the year) — 1982, 1983, 1985, 1989
- Lionel Conacher Award (Canadian male athlete of the year) — 1980, 1981, 1982, 1983, 1985, 1989, 1999
- NHL All-Star Game MVP — 1983, 1989, 1999
- NHL MVP — Rendez-vous '87
- Sports Illustrated Sportsman of the Year — 1982
- Associated Press Male Athlete of the Year — 1982
- The Sporting News Sportsman of the Year — 1981
- John Halligan Good Guy Award — 1997
- New York Rangers MVP — 1997–98
- Olympic Gold – Hockey (as Executive Director-Manager) — 2002
- World Cup of Hockey Champion (as Executive Director-Manager) — 2004

== Honours ==
- 8-time All-NHL first team (1981–87, 1991)
- 7-time All-NHL second team (1980, 1988–90, 1994, 1997, 1998)
- All-WHA second team (1979)
- In 1998, he was ranked number 1 on The Hockey News' list of the 100 Greatest Hockey Players
- Inducted into the Hockey Hall of Fame in 1999 (Three-year waiting period post retirement waived)
- His #99 was retired league wide by the NHL on February 6, 2000, during that year's All-Star game.
- Edmonton Oilers Hall of Fame 2022 inductee
- Received a Star on the Brantford Walk of Fame.
- Canada Sports Hall of Fame 1999 inductee
- In October 1999, Edmonton honoured Gretzky by renaming one of Edmonton's busiest freeways, Capilano Drive—which passes by Northlands Coliseum—to Wayne Gretzky Drive.
- Named an Officer of the Order of Canada in 1984, the promoted to Companion of the Order of Canada in 1999.
- Received an Honorary doctorate degree from the University of Alberta in 2000.
- Brantford and Area Sports Hall of Recognition class of 1984.
- First international recipient of the Horatio Alger Award
- Received star on Canada's Walk of Fame
- Associated Press athlete-of-the-decade in the 1980s
- Ranked No. 1 Canadian Athlete of the Century
- Sports Illustrated hockey player-of-the-century
- Ranked No. 5 in both ESPN SportsCentury's and the Associated Press's Top 100 Athletes of the 20th Century Behind Muhammad Ali, Michael Jordan, Babe Ruth, Jim Brown (ESPN) and Jim Thorpe (AP)
- In 2007, he was ranked number 1 in The Hockey News' book The Top 60 Since 1967
- In 2010, he was elected as an inaugural inductee into the World Hockey Association Hall of Fame in the "Legends of the Game" category.
- Awarded The Ambassador Award of Excellence by the LA Sports & Entertainment Commission in 2010.
- Alberta Sports Hall of Fame 2000 inductee.
- In 2002, the LA Kings held a jersey retirement ceremony and erected a life-sized statue of Gretzky outside the Staples Center.
- Named the Alberta Sports Hall of Fame Male Athlete of the (20th) Century.
- His hometown of Brantford, Ontario, renamed Park Road North to "Wayne Gretzky Parkway" as well as renaming the North Park Recreation Centre to The Wayne Gretzky Sports Centre.
- Ontario Sports Hall of Fame 2004 inductee.
- Named as the centre of the IIHF Centennial All-Star Team in 2008, and to the IIHF All-Time Canada Team
- Inducted into the player category of the IIHF Hall of Fame in 1999.
- Named to the inaugural class of the Order of Hockey in Canada in 2012.
- Named one of the 100 Greatest NHL Players in 2017.
- Stan Musial Lifetime Achievement Award for Sportsmanship in 2021
- Named the greatest hockey player of all time by The Athletic in 2023.

== See also ==
- 50 goals in 50 games
- List of NHL statistical leaders
- List of NHL seasons
- List of NHL players with 1,000 points
- List of NHL players with 500 goals
