= Wayne Gretzky =

Canadian ice hockey player and coach (born 1961)

CC Wayne Gretzky
- Hockey Hall of Fame, 1999
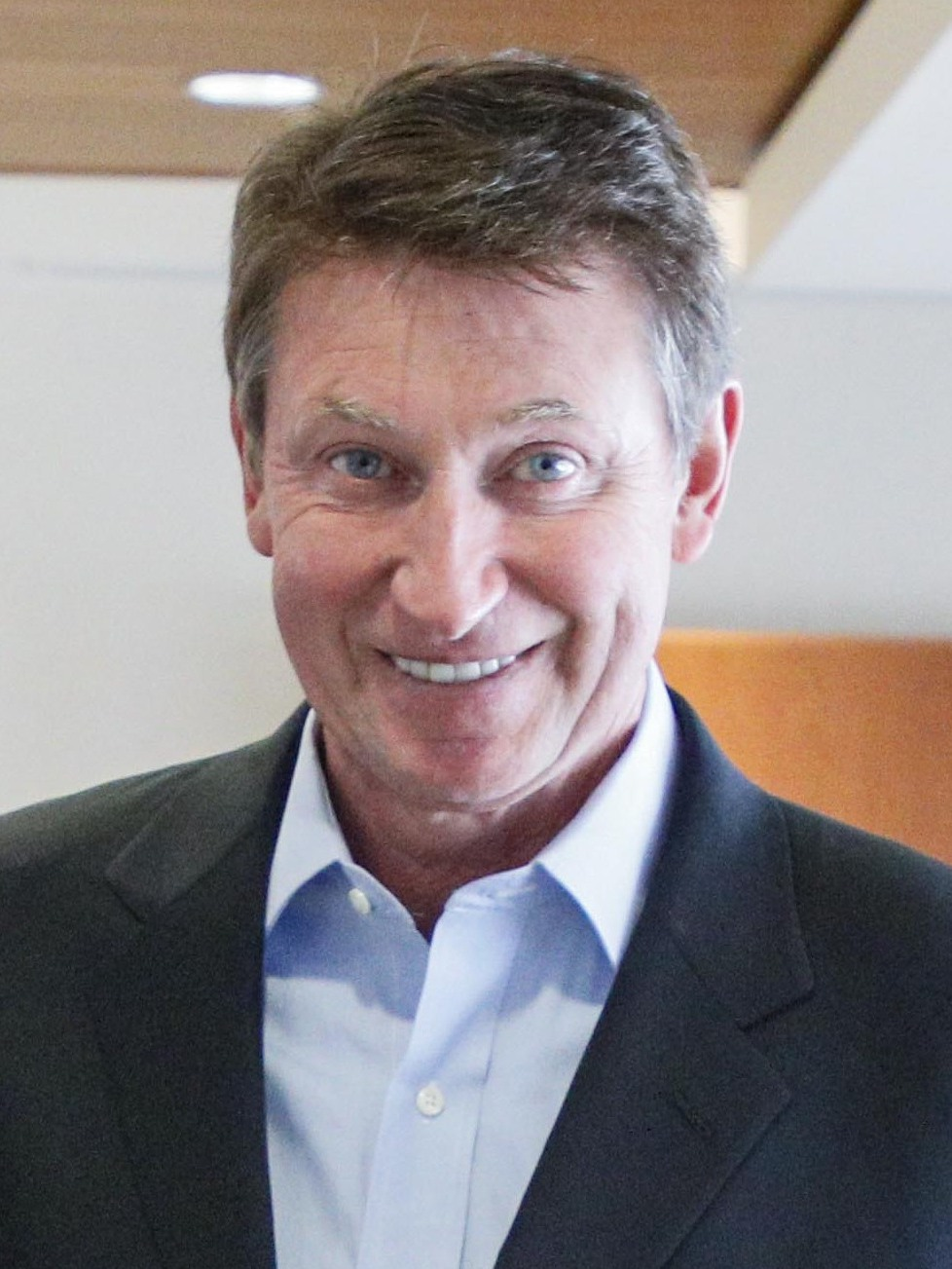
- Gretzky in 2019
- Born: January 26, 1961 (age 65) Brantford, Ontario, Canada
- Height: 6 ft 0 in (183 cm)
- Weight: 185 lb (84 kg; 13 st 3 lb)
- Position: Centre
- Shot: Left
- Played for: Indianapolis Racers; Edmonton Oilers; Los Angeles Kings; St. Louis Blues; New York Rangers
- Coached for: Phoenix Coyotes
- National team: Canada
- Playing career: 1978–1999
- Coaching career: 2005–2009
- Website: Official website

Wayne Douglas Gretzky (/ˈɡrɛtski/ GRET-skee; born January 26, 1961) is a Canadian former professional ice hockey player and head coach. He played 20 seasons in the National Hockey League (NHL) for four teams from 1979 to 1999. Nicknamed "the Great One", he has been called the greatest ice hockey player ever by the NHL based on surveys of hockey writers, ex-players, general managers and coaches. Gretzky is the leading career point scorer and assist producer in NHL history and has more assists than any other player has total career points. He is the only NHL player to total over 200 points in one season, a feat he accomplished four times. In addition, Gretzky scored more than 100 points in 15 professional seasons. At the time of his retirement in 1999, he held 61 NHL records: 40 regular season records, 15 playoff records, and six All-Star records.

Born and raised in Brantford, Ontario, Gretzky honed his skills on a backyard rink and regularly played minor ice hockey at a level far above his peers. Despite his unimpressive size and strength, Gretzky's intelligence, stamina, and reading of the game were unrivaled. He was adept at dodging checks from opposing players, consistently anticipated where the puck was going to be, and executed the right move at the right time. Gretzky became known for setting up behind his opponent's net, an area that was nicknamed "Gretzky's office".

Gretzky was the top scorer in the 1978 World Junior Championships, then signed with the Indianapolis Racers of the World Hockey Association (WHA), where he briefly played before being traded to the Edmonton Oilers. After the NHL-WHA merger, he set many scoring records in ten seasons with the Oilers, and led them to four Stanley Cup championships. Traded to the Los Angeles Kings where he played eight seasons, he led them to the 1993 Stanley Cup Final, and he is credited with popularizing hockey in California. He played briefly for the St. Louis Blues before finishing his career with the New York Rangers. He won nine Hart Trophies as the most valuable player, 10 Art Ross Trophies for most points in a season, two Conn Smythe Trophies as playoff MVP and five Lester B. Pearson Awards as the most outstanding player as judged by his peers. He led the league in goal-scoring five times and assists 16 times. He also won the Lady Byng Memorial Trophy for sportsmanship and performance five times and often spoke against fighting in hockey.

After his retirement in 1999, Gretzky was immediately inducted into the Hockey Hall of Fame, making him the most recent player to have the waiting period waived. The NHL retired his jersey number 99 league-wide. Gretzky was one of six players voted to the International Ice Hockey Federation's (IIHF) Centennial All-Star Team. He was inducted into the IIHF Hall of Fame in 2000, and received the Order of Hockey in Canada in 2012. Gretzky became executive director for the Canadian national men's hockey team during the 2002 Winter Olympics, in which the team won a gold medal. In 2000, he became part-owner of the Phoenix Coyotes, and following the 2004–05 NHL lock-out, he became the team's head coach. In 2004, Gretzky was inducted into the Ontario Sports Hall of Fame. In September 2009, following the Phoenix Coyotes' bankruptcy, Gretzky resigned as head coach and relinquished his ownership share. In October 2016, he returned to the Oilers as a minority partner and vice-chairman of their parent company, Oilers Entertainment Group. He left in 2021 to become an analyst on Turner Sports' NHL coverage.

== Early life ==
Wayne Douglas Gretzky was born on January 26, 1961, in Brantford, Ontario, the son of Phyllis Leone (Hockin) and Walter Gretzky. The couple married in 1960, and lived in an apartment in Brantford, where Walter worked for Bell Telephone Canada. The family moved into a house on Varadi Avenue in Brantford seven months after Wayne was born, chosen partly because its yard was flat enough to make an ice rink. Wayne had a sister, Kim (born 1963), and brothers Keith, Glen and Brent. The family regularly visited the farm of Wayne's grandparents, Tony and Mary, and watched Hockey Night in Canada together. By age two, Wayne was trying to score goals against Mary using a souvenir stick. The farm was where Wayne skated on ice for the first time, aged two years, 10 months.

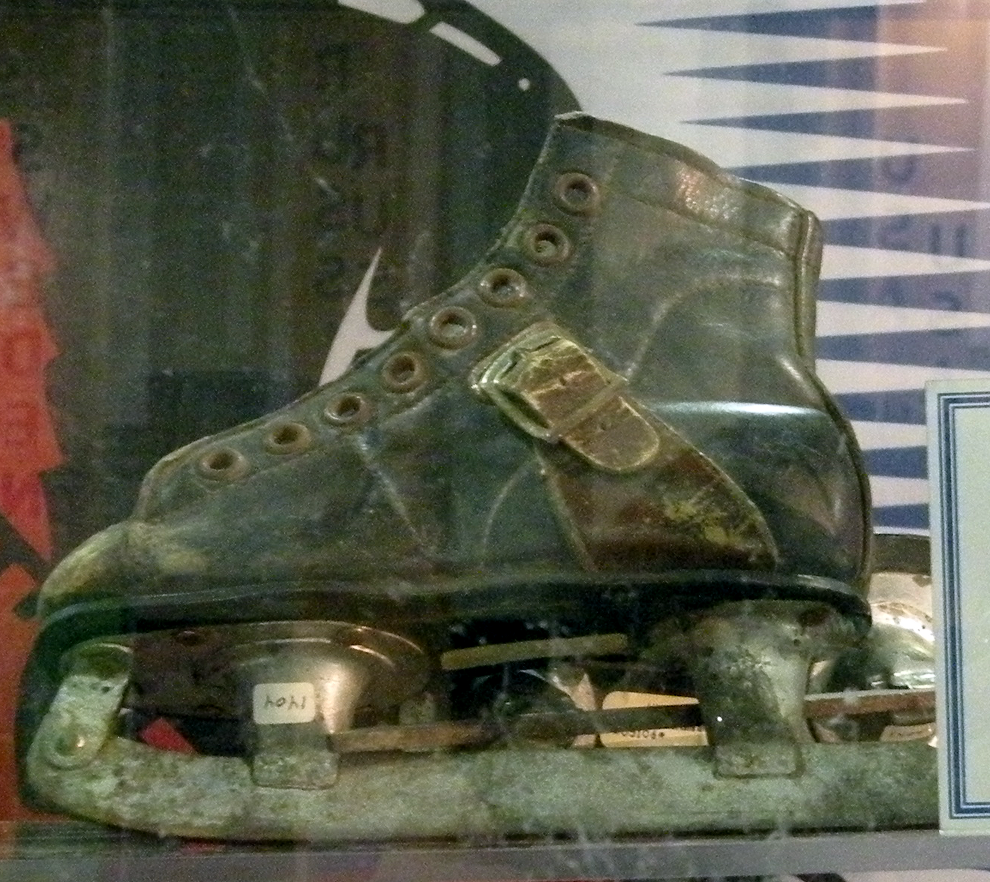
Gretzky's first pair of skates at the Hockey Hall of Fame, worn when he was three years old

Walter taught Wayne, Keith, Brent, Glen, and their friends hockey on a rink he made in the backyard of the family home, nicknamed the "Wally Coliseum". Drills included skating around bleach bottles and tin cans and flipping pucks over scattered hockey sticks to be able to pick up the puck again in full flight. Walter gave the advice to "skate where the puck's going, not where it's been". Wayne was a classic prodigy whose extraordinary skills made him the target of other children's jealous parents.

The team Gretzky played on at age six was otherwise composed of ten-year-olds. His first coach, Dick Martin, remarked that he handled the puck better than the ten-year-olds. According to Martin, "Wayne was so good that you could have a boy of your own who was a tremendous hockey player, and he'd get overlooked because of what the Gretzky kid was doing." The sweaters for ten-year-olds were far too large for Gretzky, who coped by tucking the sweater into his pants on the right side. Gretzky continued doing this throughout his NHL career.

By age ten, Gretzky had scored an astonishing 378 goals and 139 assists in just one season with the Brantford Nadrofsky Steelers. His play attracted media attention beyond Brantford, including a profile by John Iaboni in the Toronto Telegram in October 1971. In the 1974 Quebec International Pee-Wee Hockey Tournament, Gretzky scored 26 points playing for Brantford. By age 13, he had scored over 1,000 goals.

His play attracted considerable negative attention from other players' parents, including those of his teammates, and he was often booed. According to Walter, the "capper" was being booed on "Brantford Day" at Toronto's Maple Leaf Gardens in February 1975. When Gretzky was 14, his family arranged for him to move to and play hockey in Toronto, partly to further his career, and partly to remove him from the uncomfortable pressure. The Gretzkys had to legally challenge the Canadian Amateur Hockey Association to win Wayne the right to play in a different area, which was disallowed at the time. The Gretzkys won, and Wayne played Junior B hockey with the Toronto Nationals, in a league that included 20-year-olds. He earned Rookie of the Year honours in the Metro Junior B Hockey League in 1975–76, with 60 points in 28 games. The following year, as a 15–16-year-old, he had 72 points in 32 games with the same team, renamed the Seneca Nationals. Despite his offensive statistics—scoring 132 points in 60 games in Junior B—two teams bypassed him in the 1977 Ontario Major Junior Hockey League draft of 16-year-olds. The Oshawa Generals picked Tom McCarthy first, and the Niagara Falls Flyers picked Steve Peters second overall. With the third pick, the Sault Ste. Marie Greyhounds selected Gretzky, even though Walter Gretzky had told the team Wayne would not move to Sault Ste. Marie, a northern Ontario city that inflicts a heavy travelling schedule on its junior team. The Gretzkys made an arrangement with a local family they knew and Wayne played for the Greyhounds, at age 16. It was with the Greyhounds that Gretzky first wore the number 99 on his jersey. He originally wanted to wear number 9—for his hockey hero Gordie Howe—but it was already being worn by teammate Brian Gualazzi. At coach Muzz MacPherson's suggestion, Gretzky settled on 99.

== World Hockey Association ==
By 1978, the World Hockey Association, which had competed with the established NHL since 1972, was struggling. The league, which at one point iced fourteen teams, was down to seven surviving franchises. The WHA had long sought to arrange a merger with the NHL but were constantly rebuffed by a group of hardline owners in the older league. With the WHA's long-term survival in doubt, Birmingham Bulls owner John F. Bassett believed the only way to gain meaningful leverage over the NHL was to sign as many young and promising superstars as possible. The NHL did not allow the signing of players under age 20, but the WHA had no such rules. Bassett saw Gretzky as the most promising young prospect. Several WHA teams courted Gretzky, notably the Bulls and the Indianapolis Racers.

Ultimately, it was Racers owner Nelson Skalbania who, on June 12, 1978, signed 17-year-old Gretzky to a seven-year personal services contract worth US$1.75 million. Skalbania opted to have Gretzky sign a personal-services contract rather than a standard player contract in part because by that point it was well known that a majority of NHL owners, if not yet the ¾ required to add new NHL franchises, were willing to absorb at least some WHA teams. While Skalbania knew it was unlikely the Racers would be one of these teams (in part because the WHA insisted that all of its surviving Canadian teams be included), he still hoped to keep the Racers alive long enough to collect compensation from the surviving teams when the WHA dissolved, as well as any funds earned from selling the young star.

Gretzky scored his first professional goal against Dave Dryden of the Edmonton Oilers in his fifth game, and his second goal four seconds later. However, he played only eight games for Indianapolis. The Racers were losing $40,000 per game. Skalbania told Gretzky he would be moved, offering him a choice between the Edmonton Oilers and the Winnipeg Jets. On the advice of his agent, Gretzky picked the Oilers, but the move was not that simple. On November 2, Gretzky, goaltender Eddie Mio, and forward Peter Driscoll were put on a private plane, not knowing where they would land and what team they would be joining. While in the air, Skalbania worked on the deal. Skalbania offered to play a game of backgammon with Winnipeg owner Michael Gobuty, the stakes being if Gobuty won, he would get Gretzky and if he lost, he had to give Skalbania a share of the Jets. Gobuty turned down the proposal and the players landed in Edmonton. Mio paid the $4,000 bill for the flight. Skalbania sold Gretzky, Mio and Driscoll to Oilers owner Peter Pocklington, a former business partner. Although the announced price was $850,000, Pocklington paid $700,000. The money was not enough to keep the Racers alive; they folded that December.

One of the highlights of Gretzky's season was his appearance in the 1979 WHA All-Star Game. The format was a three-game series between the WHA All-Stars and Dynamo Moscow played at Edmonton's Northlands Coliseum. The WHA All-Stars were coached by Jacques Demers, who put Gretzky on a line with his boyhood idol Gordie Howe and Howe's son, Mark. In game one, the line scored seven points, and the WHA All-Stars won by a score of 4–2. In game two, Gretzky and Mark Howe each scored a goal and Gordie Howe picked up an assist as the WHA won 4–2. The line did not score in the final game, but the WHA won by a score of 4–3.

On Gretzky's 18th birthday, January 26, 1979, Pocklington signed him to a ten-year personal services contract (the longest in hockey history at the time) worth CA$3 million, with options for ten more years. Gretzky finished third in the league in scoring at 110 points, behind Robbie Ftorek and Réal Cloutier. Gretzky captured the Lou Kaplan Trophy as rookie of the year, and helped the Oilers to first place in the league.

By the end of the regular season, the signings of Gretzky and other young stars in addition to other factors had compelled enough of the hardline NHL owners to change their positions, and an agreement (recognized as the 1979 expansion by the NHL) was finalized. Under the agreement, the WHA agreed to fold after the 1979 season with the Oilers and three other teams (the Hartford (New England) Whalers, the Quebec Nordiques and the Winnipeg Jets) joining the older league as expansion franchises. The Oilers, like the other three teams, were to be allowed to protect two goaltenders and two skaters from being reclaimed by the established NHL teams in the 1979 NHL Expansion Draft. The NHL also lowered its minimum age, ensuring players such as Gretzky would not need to return to the junior level, albeit with the caveat that such previously underaged players were supposed to be placed into the 1979 NHL entry draft pool. Nevertheless, to avoid any potential for litigation over the validity of Gretzky's personal services contract the Oilers were allowed to keep him on their roster as one of their priority selections. In exchange for agreeing to keep Gretzky off the draft board, the NHL placed Edmonton at the bottom of the draft order.

The WHA completed the playoffs of its final season as planned. The Oilers reached the Avco World Trophy finals (the only WHA championship series appearance for the franchise), where they lost to the Winnipeg Jets in six games.

== NHL career ==
=== Edmonton Oilers (1979–1988) ===
Gretzky's success in the WHA carried over into the NHL, despite some critics suggesting he would struggle in what was considered the bigger, tougher, and more talented league.

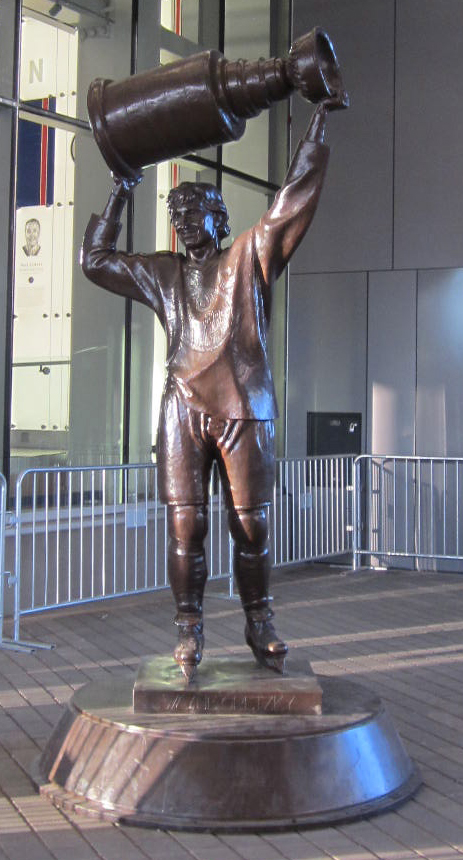
A statue, located outside Rogers Place in Edmonton, of Gretzky hoisting the Stanley Cup, which the Oilers won four times with him. Sculpted by John Weaver.

In his first NHL season, 1979–80, Gretzky was awarded the Hart Memorial Trophy as the NHL's Most Valuable Player (the first of eight in a row) and tied for the scoring lead with Marcel Dionne with 137 points. Although Gretzky played 79 games to Dionne's 80, Dionne was awarded the Art Ross Trophy because he had scored more goals (53 to 51). The season still stands as the highest point total by a first-year player in NHL history. Gretzky became the youngest player to score 50 goals, but was not eligible for the Calder Memorial Trophy, given to the top NHL rookie, because of his previous year of WHA experience. The Calder was instead awarded to Boston Bruins defenceman Ray Bourque.

In his second season, Gretzky won the Art Ross (the first of seven consecutive) with a then-record 164 points, breaking both Bobby Orr's record for assists in a season (102) and Phil Esposito's record for points in a season (152). He won his second straight Hart Trophy, and was named "Sportsman of the Year" by the Sporting News. In the first game of the 1981 Stanley Cup playoffs, against the Montreal Canadiens, Gretzky had five assists, a single game playoff record.

During the 1981–82 season, Gretzky surpassed a record that had stood for 35 years: 50 goals in 50 games, first set by Maurice "Rocket" Richard during the 1944–45 NHL season and tied by Mike Bossy during the 1980–81 NHL season. Gretzky accomplished the feat in only 39 games. His 50th goal of the season came on December 30, 1981, in the final seconds of a 7–5 win against the Philadelphia Flyers and was his fifth of the game. Later that season, Gretzky broke Esposito's record for most goals in a season (76) on February 24, 1982, scoring three to help defeat the Buffalo Sabres 6–3. He ended the 1981–82 season with records of 92 goals, 120 assists, and 212 points in 80 games, becoming the only player in NHL history to break the two hundred-point mark. That year, Gretzky became the first hockey player and first Canadian to be named Associated Press Male Athlete of the Year. He was also named 1982 "Sportsman of the Year" by Sports Illustrated. The Canadian Press also named Gretzky Newsmaker of the Year in 1982.

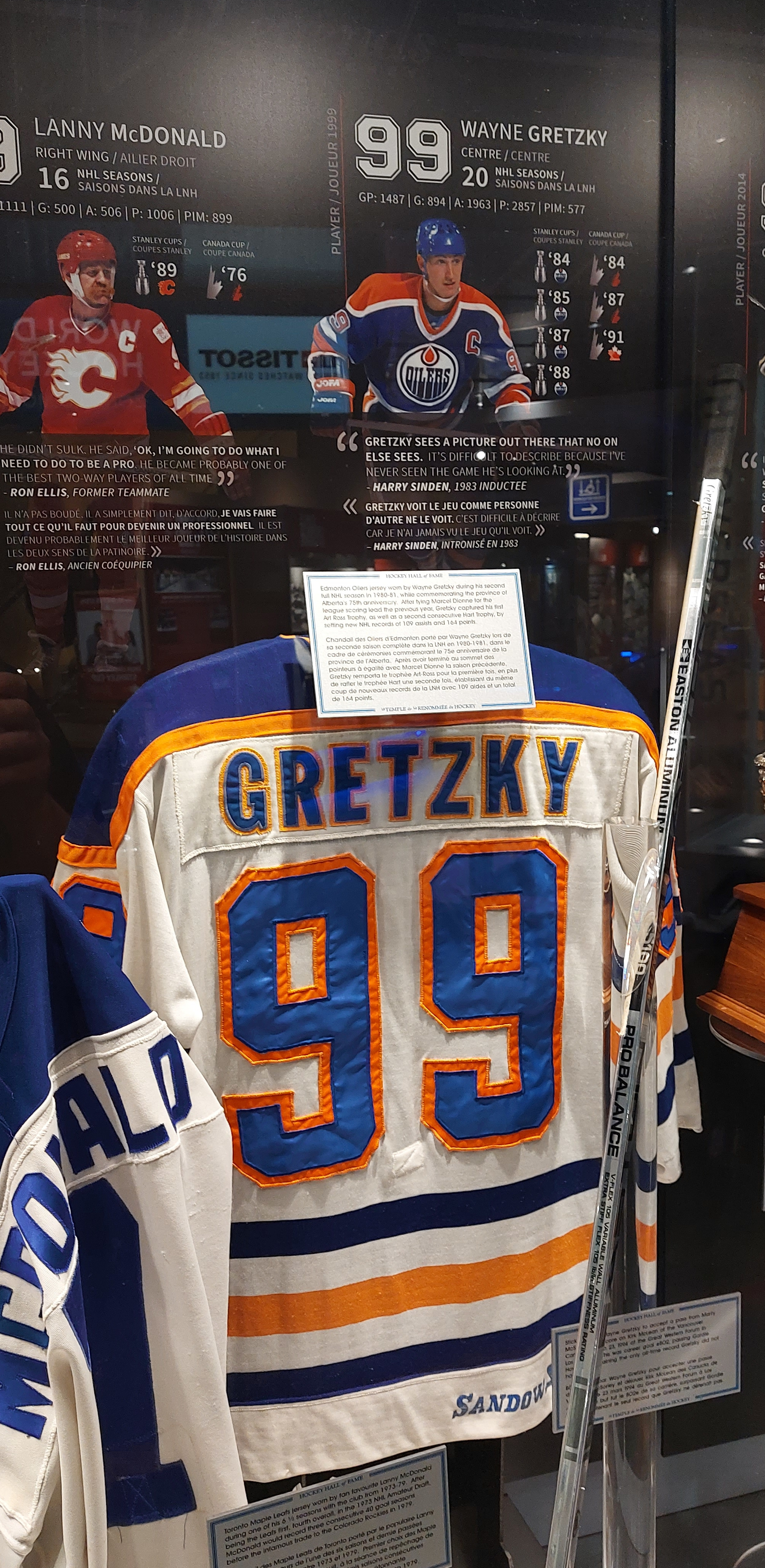
Gretzky's Oilers jersey in the Hockey Hall of Fame

The following seasons saw Gretzky break his assists record three more times (125 in 1982–83, 135 in 1984–85 and 163 in 1985–86); he also bettered that mark (120 assists) in 1986–87 with 121 and 1990–91 with 122, and his point record one more time (215, in 1985–86). By the time he finished playing in Edmonton, he held or shared 49 NHL records.

The Edmonton Oilers finished first overall in their last WHA regular season. The same success was not immediate when they joined the NHL, but within four seasons, the Oilers were competing for the Stanley Cup. The Oilers were a young, strong team featuring, in addition to Gretzky, future Hall of Famers including forwards Mark Messier, Glenn Anderson and Jari Kurri; defenceman Paul Coffey; and goaltender Grant Fuhr. Gretzky was its captain from 1983 to 1988. In 1983, they made it to the Stanley Cup Final, only to be swept by the three-time defending champion New York Islanders. The following season, the Oilers met the Islanders in the Final again, this time winning the Stanley Cup, their first of five in seven years.

Five times between 1981–82 and 1986–87, Gretzky led the NHL in goals scored. The Oilers also won the Stanley Cup with Gretzky three additional times: in 1985, 1987 and 1988.

When the Oilers joined the NHL, Gretzky continued to play under his personal services contract with Oilers owner Peter Pocklington. This arrangement came under increased scrutiny by the mid-1980s, especially following reports that Pocklington had used the contract as collateral to help secure a $31 million loan with the Alberta Treasury Branches. Amid growing concern around the NHL that a financial institution might be able to lay claim to Gretzky's rights in the event the heavily leveraged Pocklington were to declare bankruptcy, as well as growing dissatisfaction on the part of Gretzky and his advisers, in 1987, Gretzky and Pocklington agreed to replace the personal services contract with a standard NHL contract.

==== The Gretzky rule ====
In June 1985, as part of a package of five rule changes to be implemented for the 1985–86 season, the NHL Board of Governors decided to introduce offsetting penalties, where neither team lost a man when coincidental penalties were called. The effect of calling offsetting penalties was felt immediately in the NHL because during the early 1980s, when the Gretzky-era Oilers entered a four-on-four or three-on-three situation with an opponent, they frequently used the space on the ice to score one or more goals. A few days later, during a press conference the day after being awarded the Hart Memorial Trophy, Gretzky criticized the NHL for punishing teams and players who previously benefited. The rule change became known as "the Gretzky rule". The rule was reversed for the 1992–93 season, by which time a majority of the players from the all-time powerhouse Edmonton Oilers (the 1984–85 Oilers team, the one most directly impacted by the June 1985 rule change, was later voted the greatest NHL team ever, as part of the NHL's centennial celebrations) had changed teams or retired from hockey.

==== Strategy and effect on NHL play ====
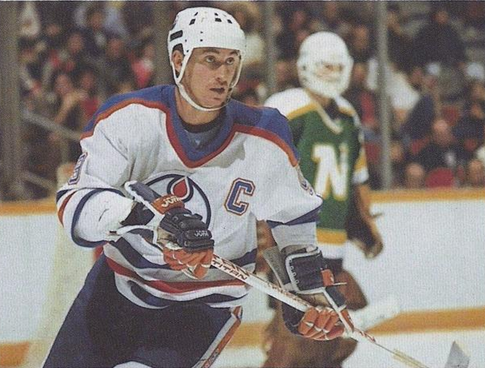
Gretzky in action against the Minnesota North Stars, c. 1985

Gretzky had a major influence on the style of play of the Edmonton Oilers and the NHL as a whole, helping to inspire a more team-based strategy. Using this approach, the Oilers, led by Gretzky, became the highest-scoring team in NHL history.

"He was, I think, the first Canadian forward to play a true team game", said hockey writer and former NHL goaltender Ken Dryden. The focus of the game before Gretzky's arrival, he said, especially among the Canadian teams, was on the player with the puck—getting the puck to a star player who would make the big play.

Gretzky reversed that. He knew he wasn't big enough, strong enough, or even fast enough to do what he wanted to do if others focused on him. Like a magician, he had to direct attention elsewhere, to his four teammates on the ice with him, to create a momentary distraction to move unnoticed into the open ice where size and strength didn't matter. ... Gretzky made his opponents compete with five players, not one, and he made his teammates full partners in the game. He made them skate to his level and pass and finish up to his level or they would be embarrassed.

Between 1982 and 1985, the Edmonton Oilers averaged 423 goals a season, when no previous team had scored 400, and Gretzky on his own had averaged 207 points when no player before had scored more than 152 in one year. Dryden wrote in his book The Game, "In the past, defenders and teams had learned to devise strategies to stop opponents with the puck. To stop them without it, that was interference. But now, if players without the puck skated just as hard as those with it, but faster, and dodged and darted to open ice just as determinedly, but more effectively, how did you shut them down?"

In this, Gretzky added his considerable influence as the preeminent NHL star of his day to that of the Soviets, who had also developed a more team style of play and had successfully used it against the best NHL teams, beginning in the 1972 Summit Series. "The Soviets and Gretzky changed the NHL game", says Dryden. "Gretzky, the kid from Brantford with the Belarusian name, was the acceptable face of Soviet hockey. No Canadian kid wanted to play like Makarov or Larionov. They all wanted to play like Gretzky."

At the same time, Gretzky recognized the contributions of their coach in the success of the Oilers: "Under the guidance of Glen Sather, our Oiler teams became adept at generating speed, developing finesse, and learning a transition game with strong European influences."

Gretzky explains his style of play further:

People think that to be a good player you have to pick the puck up, deke around ninety-three guys, and take this ungodly slap shot. No. Let the puck do all the moving and you get yourself in the right place. I don't care if you're Carl Lewis, you can't out skate that little black thing. Just move the puck: give it up, get it back, give it up. It's like Larry Bird. The hardest work he does is getting open. The jump shot is cake. That's all hockey is open ice. That's my whole strategy: Find Open Ice. Chicago coach Mike Keenan said it best: "There's a spot on the ice that's no-man's land, and all the good goal scorers find it." It's a piece of frozen real estate that's just in between the defense and the forward.

==== "The Trade" ====
Two hours after the Oilers won the Stanley Cup in 1988, Gretzky learned from his father that the Oilers were planning to deal him to another team. Walter Gretzky had known for months after having been tipped off by Skalbania, but kept the news from Wayne so as not to upset him. According to Walter, Wayne was being "shopped" to Los Angeles, Detroit, and Vancouver, and Pocklington needed money as his other business ventures were not doing well. At first, Gretzky did not want to leave Edmonton, but he received a call while on his honeymoon from Los Angeles Kings owner Bruce McNall, who asked permission to meet and discuss the deal. Gretzky informed McNall that his prerequisites for a deal to take place were that Marty McSorley and Mike Krushelnyski join him as teammates in Los Angeles. Both McNall and Pocklington quickly agreed. After the details of the trade were finalized by the two owners, one final condition had to be met: Gretzky had to call Pocklington and request a trade. When Pocklington told Oilers general manager and head coach Sather about his plans to trade Gretzky to Los Angeles, Sather tried to stop the deal, but when he found out that Gretzky had been involved in the negotiations, he changed his attitude and requested Luc Robitaille in exchange. The Kings refused, instead offering Jimmy Carson.

On August 9, 1988, in a move that heralded significant change in the NHL, the Oilers traded Gretzky (along with McSorley and Krushelnyski) to the rival Kings for Carson, Martin Gélinas, $15 million in cash, and the Kings' first-round draft picks in 1989 (later traded to the New Jersey Devils, who used it to select Jason Miller), 1991, (used to select Martin Ručinský), and 1993, (used to select Nick Stajduhar). "The Trade", as it came to be known, upset Canadians to the extent that New Democratic Party House Leader Nelson Riis demanded the government block it, and Pocklington was burned in effigy outside Northlands Coliseum.

In Gretzky's first appearance in Edmonton after the trade, a game nationally televised in Canada, he received a four-minute standing ovation. The arena was sold out, and the attendance of 17,503 was the Oilers' biggest crowd ever to that date. Large cheers erupted for his first shift, his first touch of the puck, his two assists, and Mark Messier's body check of Gretzky into the boards. After the game, Gretzky took the opportunity to confirm his patriotism: "I'm still proud to be a Canadian. I didn't desert my country. I moved because I was traded and that's where my job is. But I'm Canadian to the core. I hope Canadians understand that." After the 1988–89 season, a life-sized bronze statue of Gretzky was erected outside Northlands Coliseum, holding the Stanley Cup over his head.

=== Los Angeles Kings (1988–1996) ===
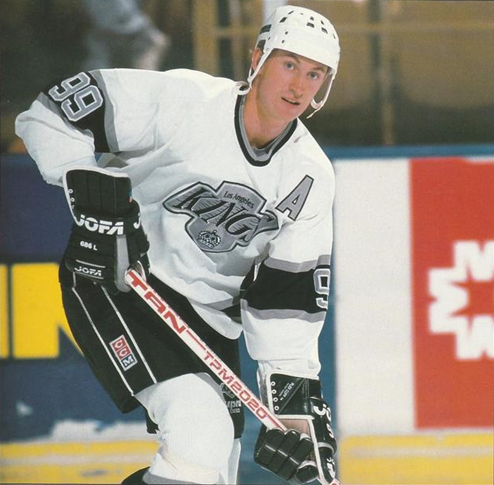
Gretzky with the Los Angeles Kings in 1988

The Kings named Gretzky their alternate captain. He made an immediate impact on the ice, scoring on his first shot on goal in the first regular season game. The Kings got off to their best start ever, winning four straight en route to qualifying for the playoffs. For only the second time in his NHL career, Gretzky finished second in scoring, but narrowly edged the Pittsburgh Penguins' Mario Lemieux (who scored 199 points) for the Hart Trophy as MVP.

Despite being underdogs against the defending Stanley Cup champion Edmonton Oilers in the Smythe Division semifinals, Gretzky led the Kings to a shocking upset of his old squad, spearheading the Kings' return from a 3–1 series deficit to win the series 4–3. He was nervous Edmonton would greet him with boos, but they were eagerly waiting for him. The Kings were then swept by the Calgary Flames, who went on to win their first Stanley Cup.

In 1990, the Associated Press named Gretzky Male Athlete of the Decade. For the second year in a row, the Kings eliminated the defending champions in the first round when they defeated the Flames in six games, but also for the second year in a row their season ended in a second round sweep, this time at the hands of Gretzky's former team. The Oilers went on to win their fifth Cup (and first without Gretzky). In his post-championship interview, Messier (who had replaced Gretzky as Edmonton's captain following the trade) dedicated the Oilers' Cup win to him.

Gretzky's first season in Los Angeles saw a marked increase in attendance and fan interest in a city not previously known for following hockey. The Kings now boasted of numerous sellouts. Many credit Gretzky's arrival with putting non-traditional American hockey markets on "the NHL map"; not only did California receive two more NHL franchises (the Mighty Ducks of Anaheim and San Jose Sharks) during Gretzky's tenure in Los Angeles, but his popularity in Southern California proved to be an impetus in the league establishing teams in other parts of the US Sun Belt.

Gretzky was sidelined for much of the 1992–93 regular season with a back injury (he returned on January 6, 1993, which was also his 1,000th NHL game), and his 65-point output ended a record 13-year streak in which he recorded at least 100 points each season. However, he performed well in the playoffs, notably when he scored a hat trick in game seven of the Campbell Conference Finals against the Toronto Maple Leafs. This victory propelled the Kings into the Stanley Cup Finals for the first time in franchise history, where they faced the Montreal Canadiens. After winning the first game of the series by a score of 4–1, the team lost the next three games in overtime, and then fell 4–1 in the deciding fifth game, where Gretzky failed to get a shot on net.

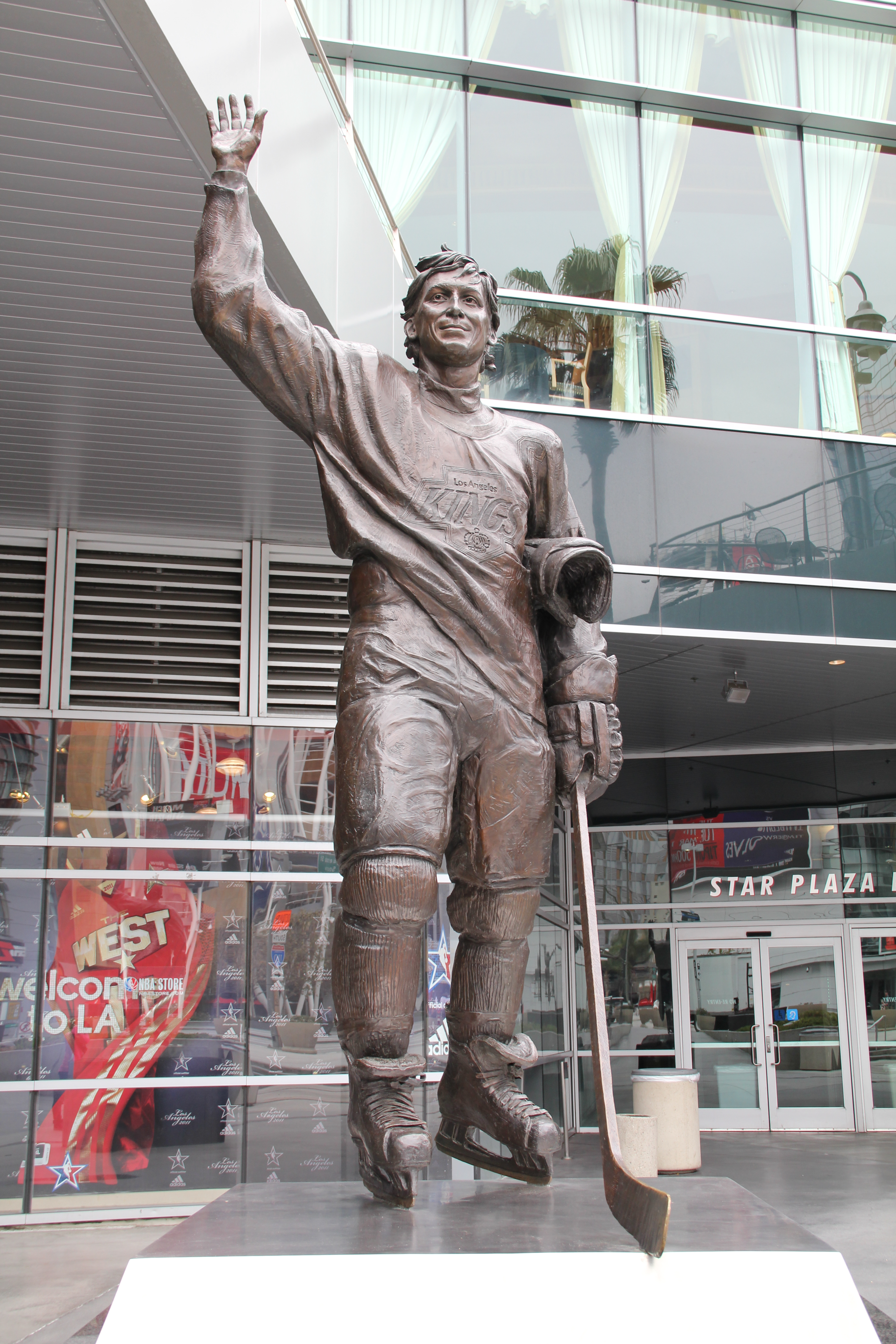
Statue of Gretzky outside Crypto.com Arena, home of the Los Angeles Kings. Gretzky played with the Kings from 1988 to 1996.

The next season, Gretzky broke Howe's career goal-scoring record of 801, and won the scoring title, but the team began a long slide, and despite numerous player and coaching moves, they failed to qualify for the playoffs again until 1998. After the financially troubled McNall was forced to sell the Kings in 1994, Gretzky's relationship with the Kings' new owners grew strained. Under both McNall and the new ownership group, the team was fiscally unstable, to the point that paychecks to players bounced. Finally, in early 1996, Gretzky requested a trade. During the 1994–95 NHL lock-out, Gretzky and some friends (including Mark Messier, Marty McSorley, Brett Hull and Steve Yzerman) formed the Ninety Nine All Stars Tour and played eight exhibition games in various countries.

=== St. Louis Blues (1996) ===
On February 27, 1996, Gretzky joined the St. Louis Blues in a trade for Patrice Tardif, Roman Vopat, Craig Johnson and two draft picks (Peter Hogan and Matt Zultek). He partially orchestrated the trade after reports surfaced that he was unhappy in Los Angeles. At the time of the trade, the Blues and New York Rangers emerged as front-runners, but the Blues met his salary demands. Gretzky was immediately named the team's captain. He scored 37 points in 31 games for the team in the regular season and the playoffs, and the Blues came within one game of the Conference Finals.

However, the chemistry everyone expected with winger Brett Hull never developed. Gretzky was also forced to endure public criticism from his head coach for the first time in his career. Long before either he or Gretzky joined the Blues, Mike Keenan had refused to moderate his coaching style even while coaching Gretzky with Team Canada during international tournaments. Gretzky's professional relationship with Keenan was thus never particularly warm, and the coach's public rebukes effectively ended any realistic prospect of Gretzky remaining in St. Louis once he became a free agent. Gretzky rejected a three-year deal worth $15 million with the Blues, and on July 21, signed with the New York Rangers as a free agent, rejoining longtime Oilers teammate Mark Messier (and former Kings teammate Luc Robitaille) for a two-year, $8 million (plus incentives) contract.

=== New York Rangers (1996–1999) ===
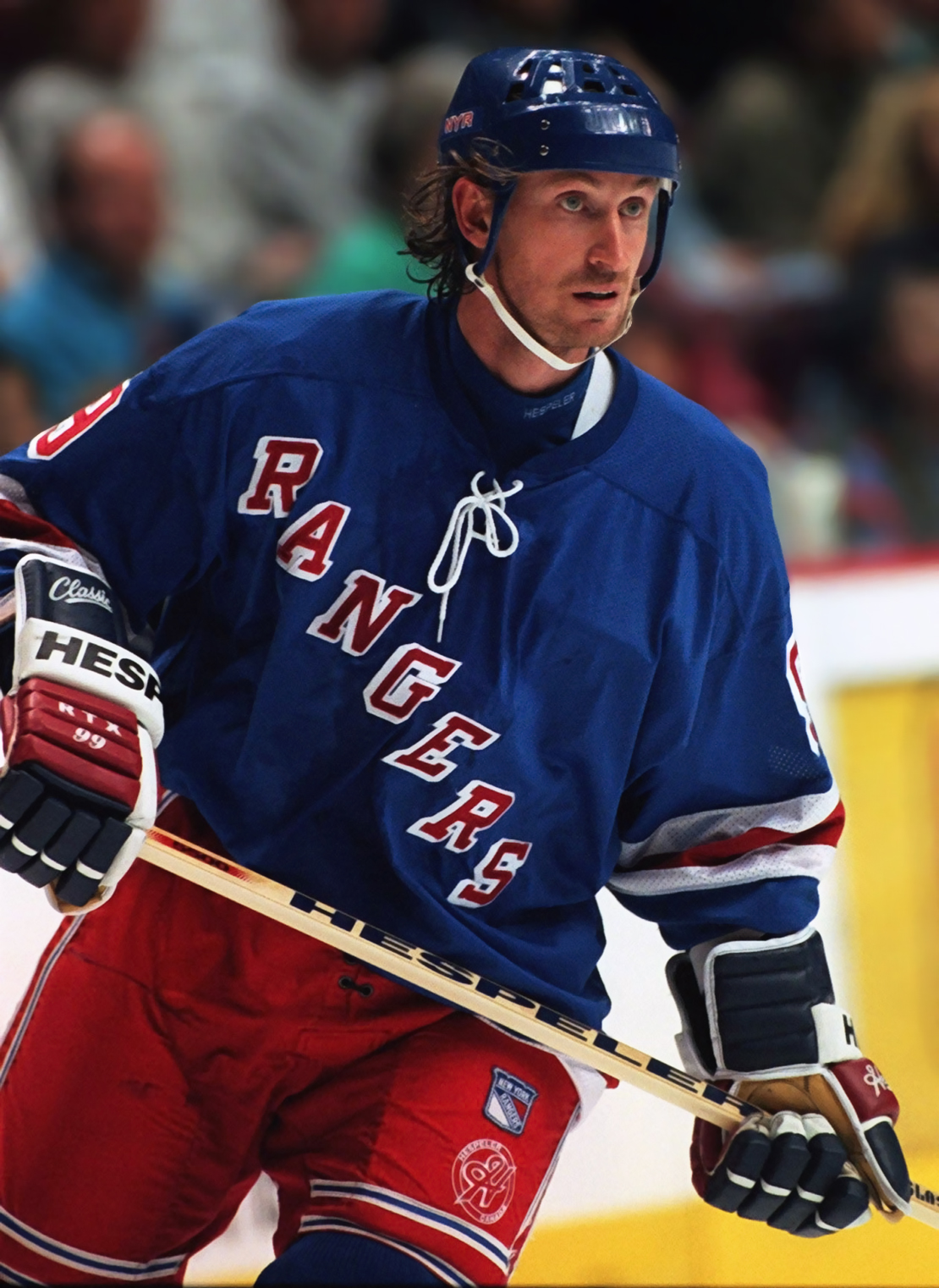
Gretzky with the New York Rangers in 1997

Gretzky was originally going to sign with the Vancouver Canucks after his tenure with the Blues ended during the summer of the 1996 offseason. Canucks president and general manager Pat Quinn and Gretzky had verbally agreed to a contract during the night that they were going to formally sign the next morning, but Stan McCammon, the CEO of Orca Bay Sports & Entertainment (the ownership group of the Canucks) ordered Quinn to call and demand that Gretzky sign that same night; when Quinn called Gretzky and demanded that he sign right now, the deal was called off due to Gretzky not liking the Canucks' new pushiness.

Gretzky ended his professional playing career by signing with the New York Rangers, where he played his final three seasons and helped the team reach the Eastern Conference Finals in 1997. The Rangers were defeated in the Conference Finals in five games by the Philadelphia Flyers, despite Gretzky leading the Rangers in the playoffs with 10 goals and 10 assists. For the first time in his NHL career, Gretzky was not named captain, except for a brief period as acting captain in 1998 when captain Brian Leetch was injured and out of the line-up. After the 1996–97 season, Mark Messier signed a free agent contract with the Vancouver Canucks, ending the brief reunion of Messier and Gretzky after just one season. The 1997 playoff run was Gretzky's last as a player, and the Rangers did not return to the playoffs until 2006, well after Gretzky retired. Along with Jaromir Jagr, he topped the NHL in the 1997–98 season with 67 assists. It was the 16th time in 19 seasons that Gretzky earned at least a share of the league lead in the statistic.

In 1997, before his retirement, The Hockey News named a committee of 50 hockey experts (former NHL players, past and present writers, broadcasters, coaches, and hockey executives) to select and rank the 50 greatest players in NHL history. The experts voted Gretzky number one. Gretzky said he would have voted Bobby Orr or Gordie Howe as the best of all time.

The 1998–99 season was his last as a professional player. He reached one milestone in this last season, breaking the professional total (regular season and playoffs) goal-scoring record of 1,071, which Gordie Howe had held. Gretzky was having difficulty scoring this season and finished with only nine goals, contributing to this being the only season in which he failed to average at least a point per game, but his last goal brought his scoring total for his combined NHL/WHA career to 1,072, one more than Howe. As the season wound down, there was media speculation that Gretzky would retire, but he refused to announce his retirement. His last NHL game in Canada was on April 15, 1999, a 2–2 tie with the Ottawa Senators and the Rangers' second-to-last game of the season. Following the contest, in a departure from the usual three stars announcement, Gretzky was awarded all three stars. Upon returning to New York, Gretzky announced he would retire after the Rangers' last game of the season.

The final game of Gretzky's career was a 2–1 overtime loss to the Pittsburgh Penguins on April 18, 1999, in Madison Square Garden. Although the game involved two American teams, both national anthems were played, with the lyrics slightly adjusted to accommodate Gretzky's departure. In place of the lyrics "O Canada, we stand on guard for thee", Bryan Adams ad-libbed, "We're going to miss you, Wayne Gretzky". "The Star-Spangled Banner", as sung by John Amirante, was altered to include the words "in the land of Wayne Gretzky". Gretzky ended his career with a final point, assisting on the lone New York goal scored by Brian Leetch. At the time of his retirement, Gretzky was the second-to-last WHA player still active in professional hockey. Mark Messier, who attended the game along with other representatives of the Edmonton Oilers dynasty, was the last.

== International play ==
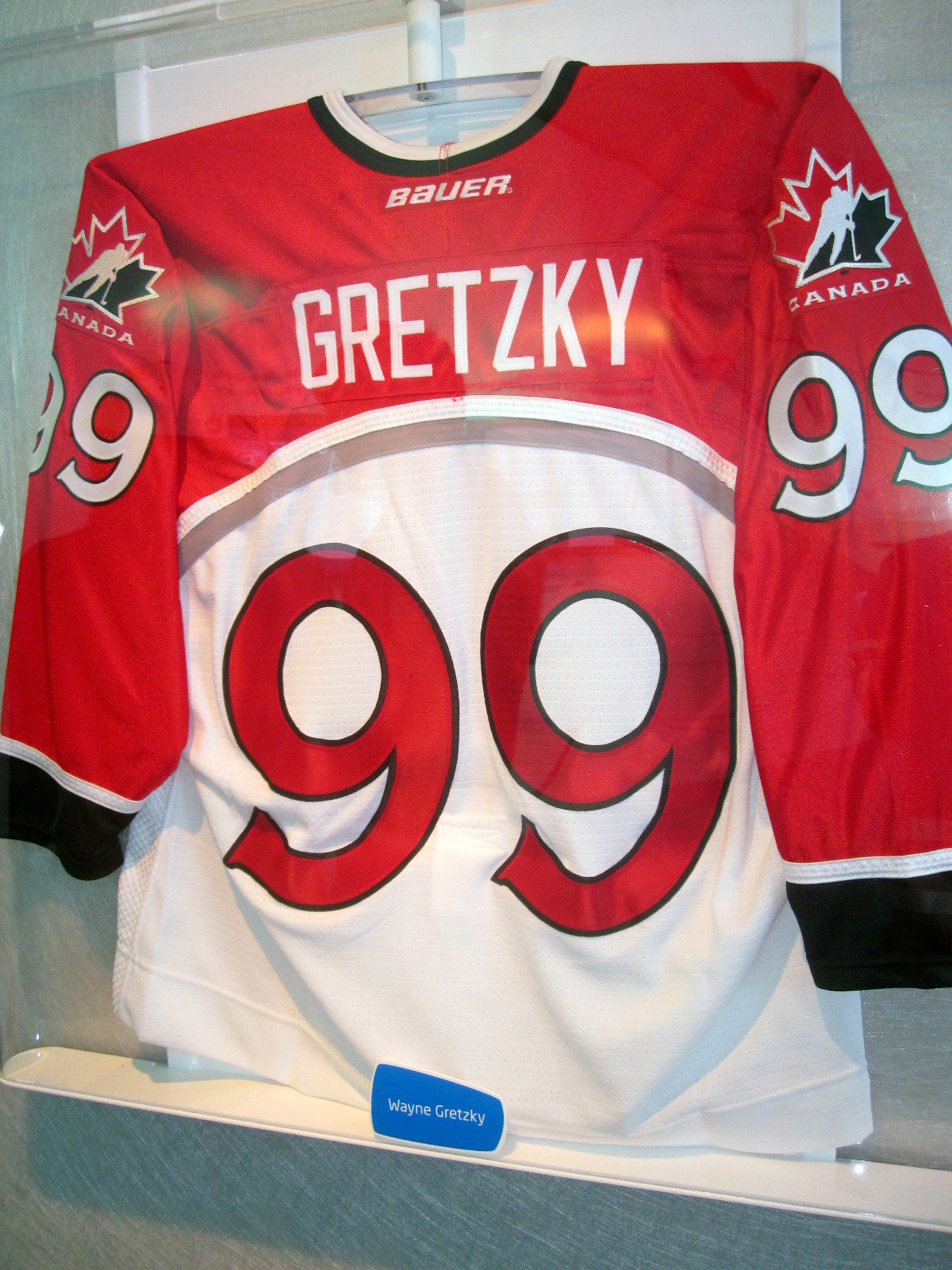
- Team Canada sweater worn by Gretzky during the 1998 Winter Olympics.

Medal record

Representing Canada

Ice hockey

Canada Cup/World Cup
Gold medal – first place	1991 Canada	
Gold medal – first place	1987 Canada	
Gold medal – first place	1984 Canada	
Silver medal – second place	1996 Canada–United States	
Silver medal – second place	1981 Canada	

World Championships
Bronze medal – third place	1982 Finland	

World Junior Championships
Bronze medal – third place	1978 Canada	

Gretzky made his first international appearance as a member of the Canadian national junior team at the 1978 World Junior Championships in Montreal, Quebec. The Canadian coach, Punch McLean, was originally sceptical of Gretzky's ability as he was the youngest player to compete in the tournament at the age of 16. He went on to lead the tournament in scoring with 17 points to earn All-Star Team and Best Forward honours. His 17 points remain the most scored by a 16-year-old in the World Junior Championships. Canada finished with the bronze medal.

Gretzky debuted with the Canadian national team at the 1981 Canada Cup. He led the tournament in scoring with 12 points en route to a second-place finish to the Soviet Union, losing 8–1 in the final. Seven months later, Gretzky joined Team Canada for the 1982 World Championships in Finland. He notched 14 points in 10 games, including a two-goal, two-assist effort in Canada's final game against Sweden to earn the bronze. Gretzky did not win his first international competition until the 1984 Canada Cup, when Canada defeated Sweden in a best-of-three finals. He led the tournament in scoring for the second consecutive time and was named to the All-Star Team.

Gretzky's international career highlight arguably came three years later at the 1987 Canada Cup. Gretzky has called the tournament the best hockey he has played in his life. Playing on a line with Pittsburgh Penguins' superstar Mario Lemieux, he recorded a tournament-best 21 points in nine games. After losing the first game of a best-of-three final series against the Soviets, Gretzky propelled Canada with a five-assist performance in the second game, including the game-winning pass to Lemieux in overtime, to extend the tournament. In the deciding game three, Gretzky and Lemieux once again combined for the game-winner. With the score tied 5–5 and 1:26 minutes to go in regulation, Lemieux one-timed a pass from Gretzky on a 3-on-1 with defenceman Larry Murphy. Lemieux scored to win the tournament for Canada; the play is widely regarded as one of the most memorable plays in Canadian international competition.

The 1991 Canada Cup marked the last time the tournament was played under the "Canada Cup" moniker. Gretzky led the tournament for the fourth and final time with 12 points in seven games. He did not, however, compete in the final against the United States due to a back injury. Canada nevertheless won in two games by scores of 4–1 and 4–2. Five years later, the tournament was revived and renamed the World Cup in 1996. It marked the first time Gretzky did not finish as the tournament's leading scorer; his seven points in eight games placed him fourth overall.

Leading up to the 1998 Winter Olympics in Nagano, Japan, it was announced that NHL players would be eligible to play for the first time. Gretzky was named to the club on November 29, 1997. However, Gretzky was passed over for the captaincy, along with several other Canadian veterans including Steve Yzerman and Ray Bourque in favour of the younger Eric Lindros. Expectations were high for the Canadian team, but the team lost to the Czech Republic in the semi-finals. The game went to a shootout with a 1–1 tie after overtime, but Gretzky was controversially not selected by coach Marc Crawford as one of the five shooters, all of whom failed to score. Team Canada then lost the bronze medal game 3–2 to Finland to finish without a medal. The Olympics marked Gretzky's eighth and final international appearance, finishing with four assists in six games. He retired from international play holding the records for most goals (20), most assists (28), and most overall points (48) in best-on-best hockey.

== Skills and influences ==
=== Style of play ===
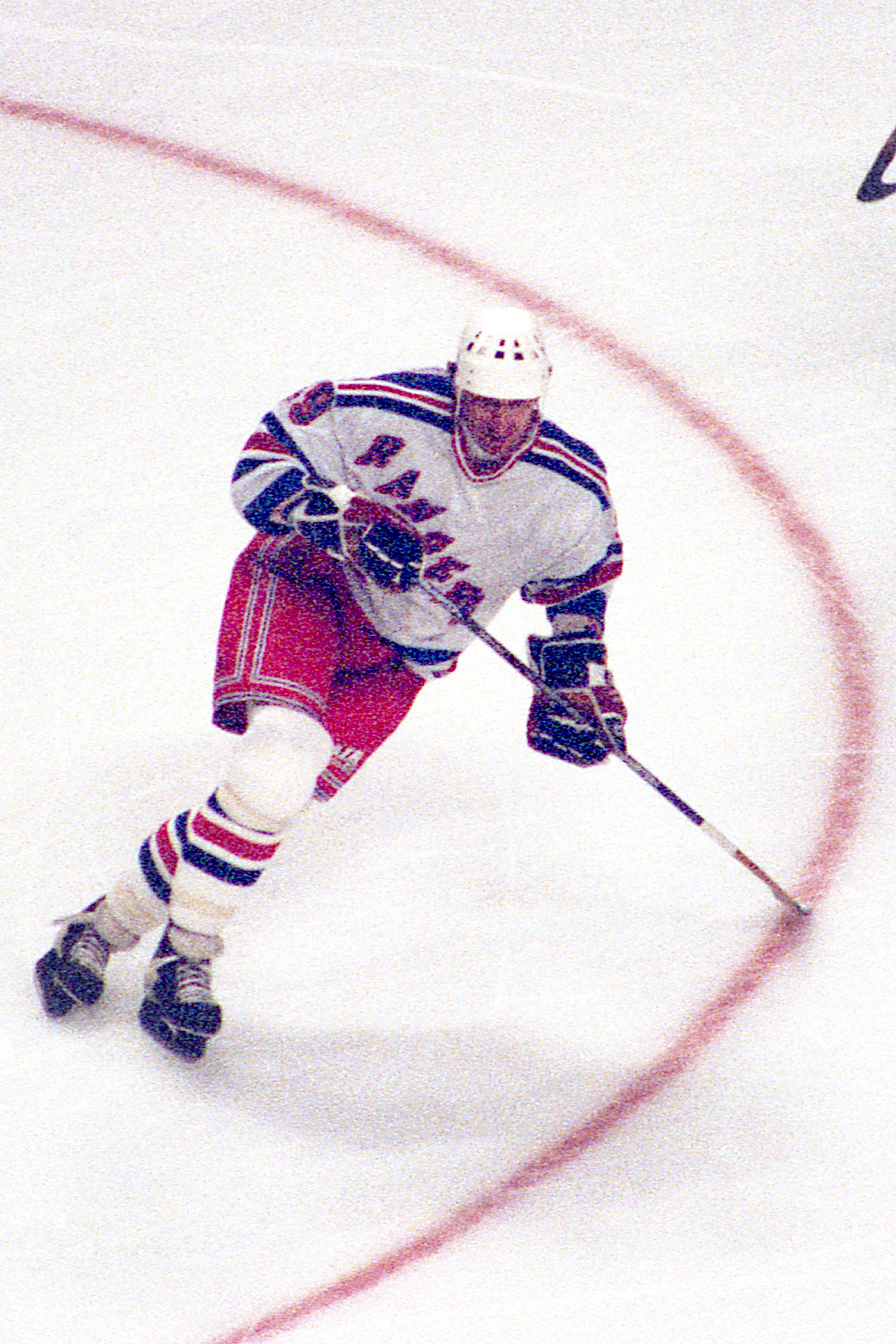
Gretzky in 1997

Gretzky's size and strength were unimpressive—in fact, far below average for the NHL—but he is widely considered the smartest player in the history of the game. His reading of the game and his ability to improvise on the fly were unrivaled, and he could consistently anticipate where the puck was going to be and execute the right move at the right time. His coach at the Edmonton Oilers, Glen Sather, said, "He was so much more intelligent. While they were using all this energy trying to rattle his teeth, he was just skating away, circling, analyzing things."

He was also considered one of the most creative players in hockey. "You never knew what he was going to do", said hockey Hall of Famer Igor Larionov. "He was improvising all the time. Every time he took the ice, there was some spontaneous decision he would make. That's what made him such a phenomenal player." Gretzky's ability to improvise came into the spotlight at the 1998 Olympics in Japan. Then an older player in the sunset of his career, he had been passed over for the captaincy of the team. But as the series continued, his unique skills made him a team leader.

The Canadians had trouble with the big ice. They had trouble with the European patterns and the lateral play and the endless, inventive cycling. ... Slowly, as game after game went by and the concern continued to rise, Wayne Gretzky began climbing through the line-up. He, almost alone among the Canadians, seemed to take to the larger ice surface as if it offered more opportunity instead of obligation ... His playing time soared, as he was being sent on not just for power plays but double shifts and even penalty kills. By the final round ... it was Wayne Gretzky who assumed the leadership both on and off the ice.

He passed and shot with prodigious skill. Hall of Fame defenceman Bobby Orr said of Gretzky, "He passes better than anybody I've ever seen." In his first two seasons in the NHL, his deft passing skills helped earn him a reputation as an ace playmaker, and so opposing defencemen focused their efforts on foiling his attempts to pass the puck to other scorers. In response, Gretzky started shooting on goal himself—and with exceptional effectiveness. He had a fast and accurate shot. "Wayne Gretzky was one of the most accurate scorers in NHL history", said one biography. Statistics support the contention: whereas Phil Esposito, who had set the previous goal-scoring record, needed 550 shots to score 76 goals, Gretzky netted his 76th after only 287 shots—about half as many. He scored his all-time single-season record of 92 goals with just 369 shots. Because he was so light compared to other players, goalies were often surprised by how hard Gretzky's shot was. Goalies called his shots "sneaky fast". He also had a way of never shooting the puck with the same rhythm twice, making his shots harder to time and block.

Veteran Canadian journalist Peter Gzowski wrote that Gretzky seemed to be able to slow down time. "There is an unhurried grace to everything Gretzky does on the ice. Winding up for the slapshot, he will stop for an almost imperceptible moment at the top of his arc, like a golfer with a rhythmic swing." "Gretzky uses this room to insert an extra beat into his actions. In front of the net, eyeball to eyeball with the goaltender ... he will ... hold the puck one ... extra instant, upsetting the anticipated rhythm of the game, extending the moment. ... He distorts time, and not only by slowing it down. Sometimes he will release the puck before he appears to be ready, threading the pass through a maze of players precisely to the blade of a teammate's stick, or finding a chink in a goaltender's armour and slipping the puck into it ... before the goaltender is ready to react."

Commentators have noted Gretzky's uncanny ability to judge the position of the other players on the ice—so much so that many suspected he enjoyed some kind of extrasensory perception, that he played like he had "eyes in the back of his head". Gretzky said he sensed other players more than he saw them. "I get a feeling about where a teammate is going to be", he said. "A lot of times, I can turn and pass without even looking." Gretzky explained that what appeared to be instinct was, in large part, the effect of his relentless study and practice of the game, in co-operation with his coaches. As a result, he developed a deep understanding of its shifting patterns and dynamics. Gzowski said that Gretzky understood the game so well, that he could instantly recognize and capitalize upon emerging patterns of play: "What we take to be creative genius is in fact a reaction to a situation that he has stored in his brain as deeply and firmly as his own phone number." Gretzky agreed with this assessment, saying, "That's a hundred percent right. It's all practice. I got it from my Dad. . . . Nobody would ever say a doctor had learned his profession by instinct; yet in my own way I've put in almost as much time studying hockey as a medical student puts in studying medicine."

=== Physical attributes ===
When he entered the league in 1979, critics opined that Gretzky was "too small, too wiry, and too slow to be a force in the [NHL]". He weighed 160 pounds (73 kg), compared to the NHL average of 189 pounds (86 kg) at that time. But that year, Gretzky tied for first place in scoring, and won the Hart Trophy for the league's most valuable player. In his second year in the league, weighing just 165 pounds, he broke the previous single-season scoring record, racking up 164 points. The next year (1981–82), at 170 pounds—still "a wisp compared to the average NHL player"—he set the all-time goal-scoring record, putting 92 pucks in the net. He weighed "about 170 pounds" for the better part of his career. He consistently scored last in strength tests among the Edmonton Oilers, bench pressing only 140 pounds (64 kg).

Despite his lack of strength, Gretzky had remarkable physical stamina. Like his hero, Gordie Howe, Gretzky possessed "an exceptional capacity to renew his energy resources quickly". In 1980, when an exercise physiologist tested the recuperative abilities of all of the Edmonton Oilers, Gretzky scored so high that the tester said he "thought the machine had broken". His stamina is also indicated by the fact that Gretzky often scored late in the game. In the year he scored his record 92 goals, 22 of them went in the net during the first period, 30 in the second—and 40 in the third.

He also had strong general athletic skills. Growing up, he was a competitive runner and also batted .492 for the Junior Intercounty Baseball League's Brantford CKCP Braves in the summer of 1980. As a result, he was offered a contract by the Toronto Blue Jays. Gretzky also excelled at box lacrosse, which he played during the summer. At age ten, after scoring 196 goals in his hockey league, he scored 158 goals in lacrosse.

According to Gretzky, lacrosse was where he learned how to avoid getting hit and to protect himself from hard checks in the event he did get hit: "In those days you could be hit from behind in lacrosse, as well as cross-checked, so you had to learn how to roll body checks for self-protection." Gretzky applied this technique as a professional player, avoiding checks with such skill that a rumour circulated that there was an unwritten rule not to hit him. This was how Gretzky avoided serious injuries despite being undersized and entering the NHL during its "rough and tumble time"; Gretzky noted that his contemporary Mike Bossy "took a beating to score goals, which consequently led him to retire because his back took a beating". Defencemen found Gretzky a most elusive target. The 205-pound (93 kg) Denis Potvin, a fellow Hall of Famer, compared attempting to hit Gretzky to "wrapping your arms around fog. You saw him but when you reached out to grab him your hands felt nothing, maybe just a chill."

Gretzky received a good deal of cover from burly Oiler enforcers Dave Semenko and Marty McSorley. The latter was traded with Gretzky in 1988 to the Los Angeles Kings, where he played the same policeman role for several more years. But Gretzky discouraged unfair hits in another way. "If a guy ran him, Wayne would embarrass that guy", said former Oiler Lee Fogolin. "He'd score six or seven points on him. I saw him do it night after night."

== Post-retirement ==
Gretzky was named honorary chairman of the Open Ice Summit, held in August 1999 to discuss ways to improve Canadian ice hockey. He stressed the need to play and practice hockey for the love of the game, and felt that skill was more important to develop than talent and that Canada had the potential to be world leaders in skill development.

Gretzky was inducted into the Hockey Hall of Fame on November 22, 1999, becoming the tenth player to bypass the three-year waiting period. The Hall of Fame then announced that he would be the last player to do so. He was inducted into the IIHF Hall of Fame in 2000. In addition, Gretzky's jersey number 99 was retired league-wide at the 2000 NHL All-Star Game, a decision inspired by Major League Baseball's retirement of the number 42 worn by Jackie Robinson. In October 1999, Edmonton honoured Gretzky by renaming one of Edmonton's busiest freeways, Capilano Drive—which passes by Northlands Coliseum—to Wayne Gretzky Drive. Also in Edmonton, the local transit authority assigned a rush-hour bus route numbered No. 99 which also runs on Wayne Gretzky Drive for its commute.

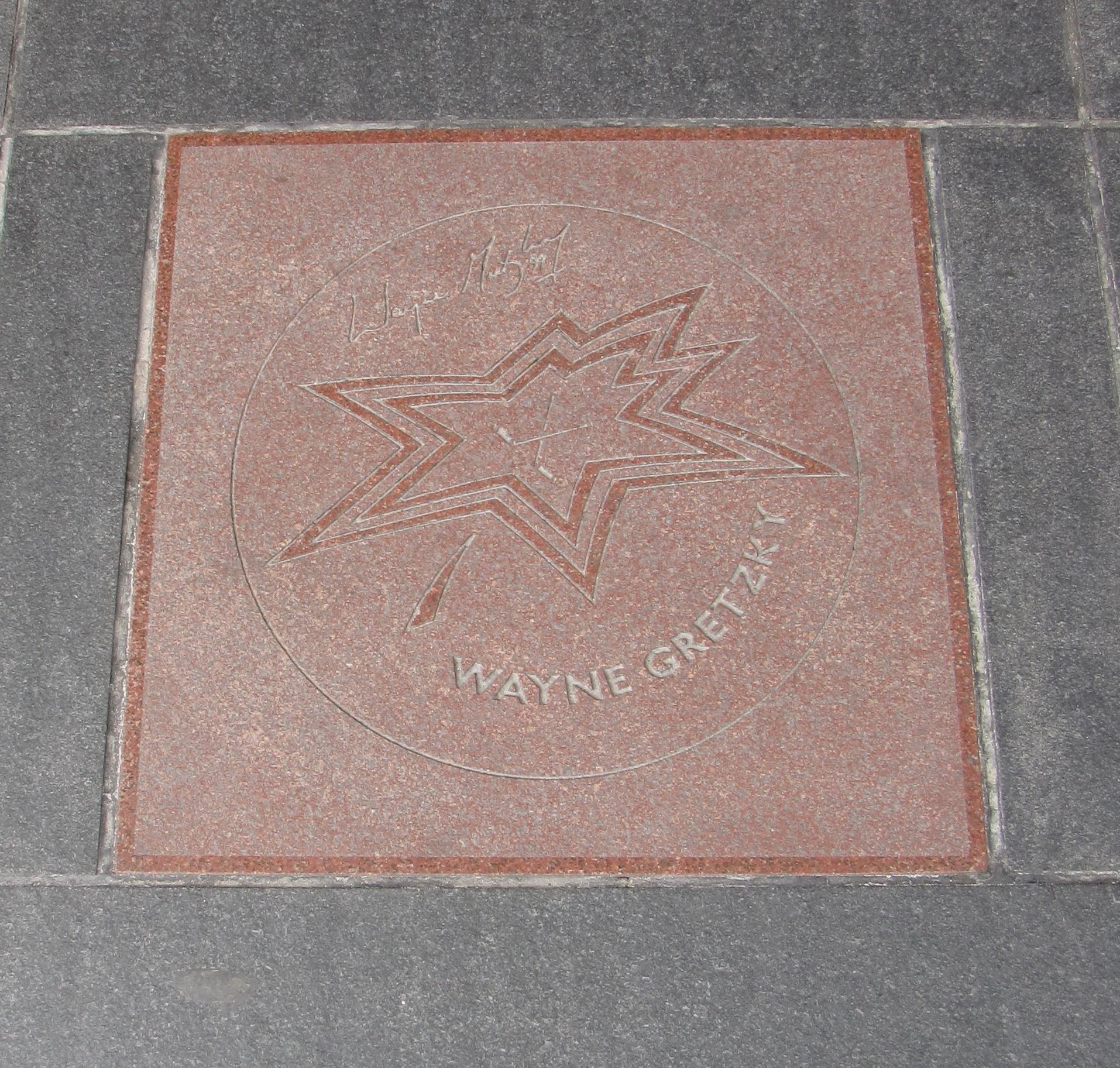
Gretzky's star on Canada's Walk of Fame. He received the honour in 2002.

In 2002, the Kings held a jersey retirement ceremony and erected a life-sized statue of Gretzky outside the Staples Center; the ceremony was delayed until then so that Bruce McNall, who had recently finished a prison sentence, could attend. Also in 2002, Gretzky received a star on Canada's Walk of Fame in Toronto. His hometown of Brantford, Ontario, renamed Park Road North to "Wayne Gretzky Parkway" as well as renaming the North Park Recreation Centre to The Wayne Gretzky Sports Centre. Brantford further inducted Gretzky into its "Walk of Fame" in 2004. On May 10, 2010, he was awarded The Ambassador Award of Excellence by the LA Sports & Entertainment Commission.

=== Phoenix Coyotes ===
Almost immediately after retirement, several NHL teams approached Gretzky about an ownership role. In May 2000, he agreed to buy a 10% stake in the Phoenix Coyotes in a partnership with majority owner Steve Ellman, taking on the roles of alternate governor, managing partner and head of hockey operations. The Coyotes were in the process of being sold and Ellman convinced Gretzky to come on board, averting a potential move to Portland, Oregon. The sale was not completed until the following year, on February 15, 2001, after two missed deadlines while securing financing and partners before Ellman and Gretzky could take over. Trucking magnate and Arizona Diamondbacks part-owner Jerry Moyes was added to the partnership. Gretzky convinced his long-time agent Michael Barnett to join the team as its General Manager.

In 2005, rumours began circulating that Gretzky was about to name himself head coach of the Coyotes, but were denied by Gretzky and the team. Ultimately, Gretzky agreed to become head coach on August 8, 2005. Gretzky made his coaching debut on October 5, and won his first game, on October 8 against the Minnesota Wild. He took an indefinite leave of absence on December 17 to be with his ill mother. Phyllis Gretzky died of lung cancer on December 19. Gretzky resumed his head-coaching duties on December 28. The Coyotes' record at the end of the 2005–06 season was 38–39–5, a 16-win improvement over 2003–04; they were 36–36–5 in games Gretzky coached.

In 2006, Moyes became majority owner of the team. There was uncertainty about Gretzky's role until it was announced on May 31, 2006, that he had agreed to a five-year contract to remain head coach. The Coyotes' performance declined in 2006–07, as the team ended the season 15th in their conference. During Gretzky's coaching tenure, the Coyotes did not reach the postseason, and their best finish in the Western Conference standings was 12th.

On May 5, 2009, the Coyotes' holding company, Dewey Ranch Hockey LLC, filed for Chapter 11 bankruptcy. An ownership dispute involving Research in Motion's Jim Balsillie (to relocate the team to Hamilton, Ontario) and the NHL itself arose, which eventually ended up in court. Gretzky did not attend the Coyotes' training camp, leaving associate head coach Ulf Samuelsson in charge, due to an uncertain contractual status with the club, whose bankruptcy hearings were continuing. Bidders for the club had indicated that Gretzky would no longer be associated with the team after it emerged from bankruptcy, and on September 24, 2009, Gretzky stepped down as head coach and head of hockey operations of the Coyotes. Gretzky's final head coaching record was 143–161–24.

=== Winter Olympics ===
Gretzky was executive director of the Canadian men's hockey team at the 2002 Winter Olympics in Salt Lake City, Utah. On February 18, he lashed out at the media at a press conference, frustrated with media and fan comments regarding his team's uninspiring 1–1–1 start. His temper boiled over after Canada's 3–3 draw versus the Czech Republic, as he launched a tirade against the perceived negative reputation of Team Canada among other national squads, and called rumours of dissent in the dressing room the result of "American propaganda". "They're loving us not doing well", he said, referring to American hockey fans. American fans online began calling Gretzky a "crybaby"; defenders said he was merely borrowing a page from former coach Glen Sather to take the pressure off his players. Gretzky addressed those comments by saying he spoke out to protect the Canadian players, and the tirade was not "staged". The Canadian team won the gold medal, its first in 50 years.

Gretzky again acted as executive director of Canada's men's hockey team at the 2006 Winter Olympics in Turin, Italy, though not with the success of 2002; the team was eliminated in the quarterfinals and failed to win a medal. He was asked to manage Canada's team at the 2005 Ice Hockey World Championships, but declined due to his mother's poor health.

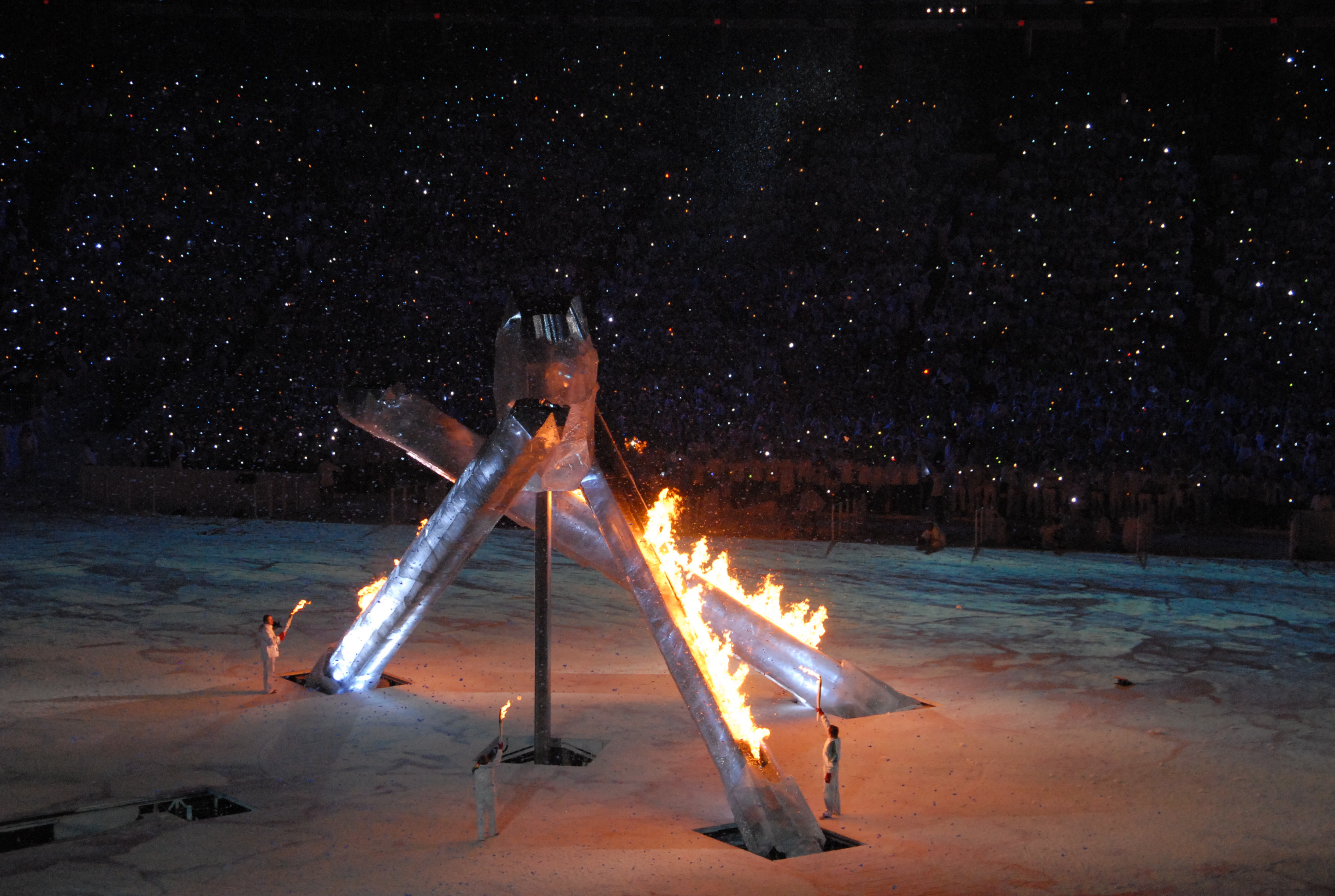
The lighting of an Olympic cauldron inside BC Place Stadium during the opening ceremony of the 2010 Winter Olympics.

Gretzky served as an ambassador to Vancouver's successful bid for the 2010 Winter Olympics, and was named Special Advisor to Canada's men's hockey team at the Games. During the Games' opening ceremony, Gretzky, basketball player Steve Nash, skier Nancy Greene, and speed skater Catriona Le May Doan jointly lit the Olympic cauldron inside the ceremony venue of BC Place. Due to BC Place being an indoor stadium, and Olympic protocols stating that the lighting of the cauldron should be visible to the public, Gretzky was then escorted out of the stadium to light a second, outdoor cauldron outside the Vancouver Convention Centre, making him the de facto final torchbearer.

=== Alumni games ===
Although Gretzky had previously stated he would not participate in any "old-timers exhibition games", on November 22, 2003, he took to the ice to help celebrate the Edmonton Oilers' 25th anniversary as an NHL team. The Heritage Classic, held at Commonwealth Stadium in Edmonton, was the first regular season NHL game to be played outdoors. It was preceded by the Mega Stars game, which featured Gretzky and many of his Oiler Dynasty teammates against a group of retired Montreal Canadiens players (whose likes included Claude Lemieux, Guy Lafleur and others). Despite frigid temperatures, the crowd numbered 57,167, with an additional several million watching the game on television. The Edmonton alumni won the Megastars game 2–0, while Montreal went on to win the regular season game held later that day, 4–3.

Thirteen years later, on December 31, 2016, Gretzky participated in the Winter Classic Alumni Game, which was held between teams of former Chicago Blackhawks and St. Louis Blues players two days before the 2017 Winter Classic. Gretzky represented the Blues in the game, which his team won 8–7.

=== Edmonton Oilers ===
In October 2016, Gretzky returned to the Oilers as a partner and vice-chairman of the team's parent company, Oilers Entertainment Group, to work closely with owner Daryl Katz and Oilers Entertainment Group CEO Bob Nicholson on the business side of the Oilers' operation.

On May 25, 2021, Gretzky announced that he would step down from his role with the Oilers, stating that "The Oilers, their fans, and the city of Edmonton have meant the world to me and my family for over four decades—and that will never end. Given the pandemic and other life changes, I realize I will not be able to dedicate the time nor effort needed to support this world-class organization." It was subsequently reported by various outlets that Gretzky had signed with new US NHL rightsholder Turner Sports to become an analyst. He serves as a studio analyst for NHL broadcasts on TNT and TBS.

== Personal life ==
Gretzky has appeared on television, including as a Dance Fever celebrity judge, and acted in a dramatic role alongside Victor Newman in The Young and the Restless in 1981. In 1984, he travelled to the Soviet Union to film a television program on Russian goaltender Vladislav Tretiak. Gretzky was a guest host of the American late night variety show Saturday Night Live in 1989. A fictional crime-fighting version of him served as one of the main characters in the cartoon ProStars in 1991. In December 2016, Gretzky made a cameo on a Christmas episode of The Simpsons as a winter character. Gretzky also participated in the 2026 FIFA World Cup draw on December 5, 2025.

Gretzky is a dual citizen of Canada and the United States, having become a naturalized citizen of the latter. In 2025, he denied having United States citizenship.

Gretzky is an avid golfer and hosted the Ford Wayne Gretzky Classic from 2008 to 2010. In 2024, Gretzky took part in The Match golf challenge, billed as the Match Superstars, featuring an all-celebrity format at Breakers West Country Club in West Palm Beach, Florida. Teamed with comedian Bill Murray, they reached the final round versus Michael Phelps winning by two holes.

=== Family ===
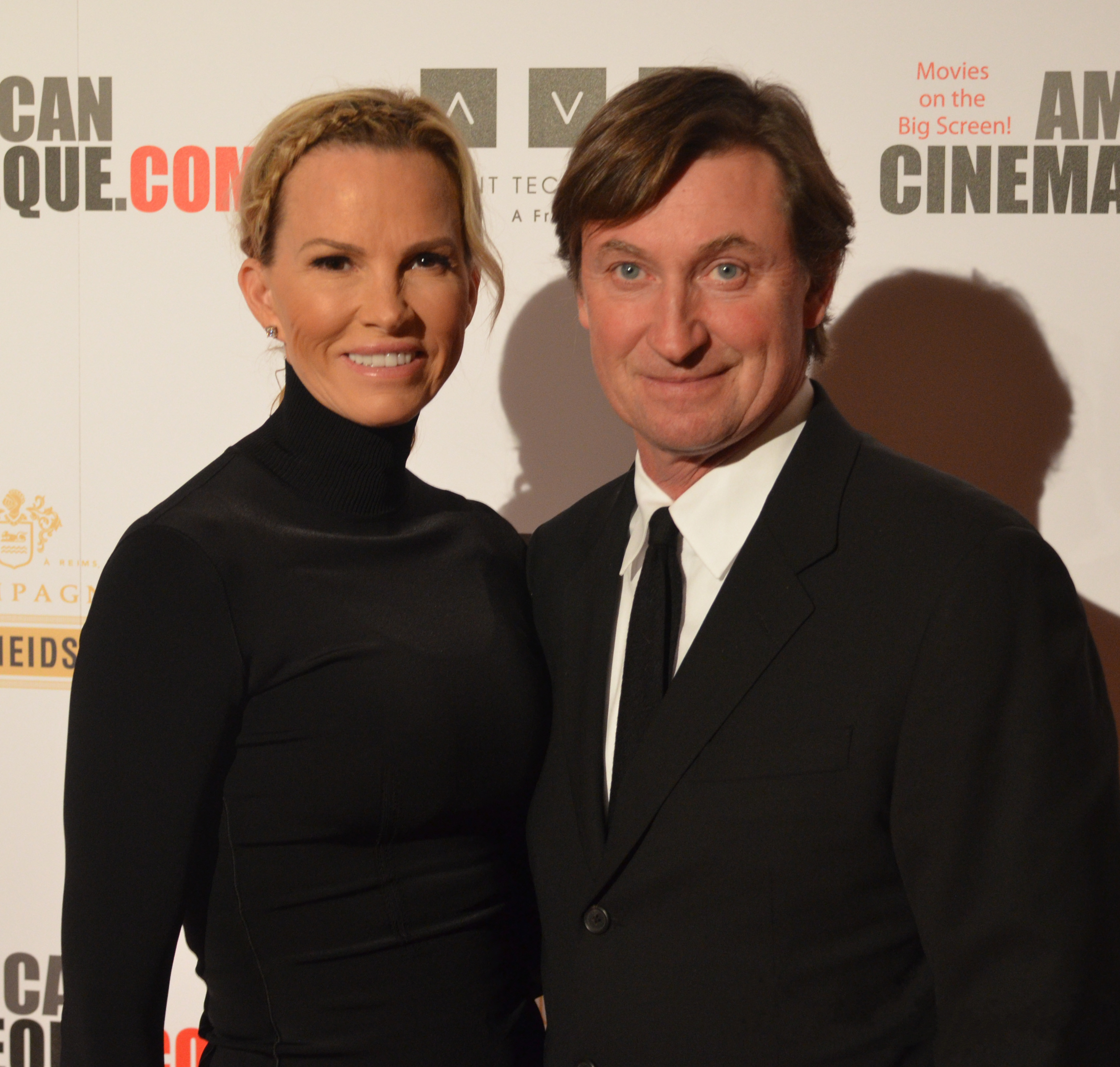
Janet and Wayne Gretzky in December 2013

While serving as a judge on Dance Fever, Gretzky met actress Janet Jones. According to Gretzky, Jones does not recall his being on the show. They met regularly after that, but did not become a couple until 1987 when they ran into each other at a Los Angeles Lakers game. Gretzky proposed in January 1988, and they were married on July 16, 1988, in a lavish ceremony the Canadian press dubbed "The Royal Wedding". Broadcast live throughout Canada from Edmonton's St. Joseph's Basilica, members of the Fire Department acted as ceremonial guards. The event reportedly cost Gretzky over US$1 million.

The couple have five children: Paulina, Ty, Trevor, Tristan, and Emma. Paulina and golfer Dustin Johnson announced their engagement on August 18, 2013, and married on April 23, 2022, in Tennessee. Ty played hockey at Shattuck-Saint Mary's, but quit the sport, and attended Arizona State University. Trevor is a former minor league baseball player.

His father Walter died in 2021 at age 82.

=== Business ventures ===
Gretzky owned or partnered in the ownership of two sports teams before becoming a partner in the Phoenix Coyotes. In 1985, Gretzky bought the Hull Olympiques of the Quebec Major Junior Hockey League for CA$175,000. During his ownership, the team's colours were changed to silver and black, presaging the change in team jersey colours when he played for the Los Angeles Kings. For the first season that Gretzky played in Los Angeles, the Kings had their training camp at the Olympiques' arena. Gretzky sold the team in 1992 for CA$550,000.

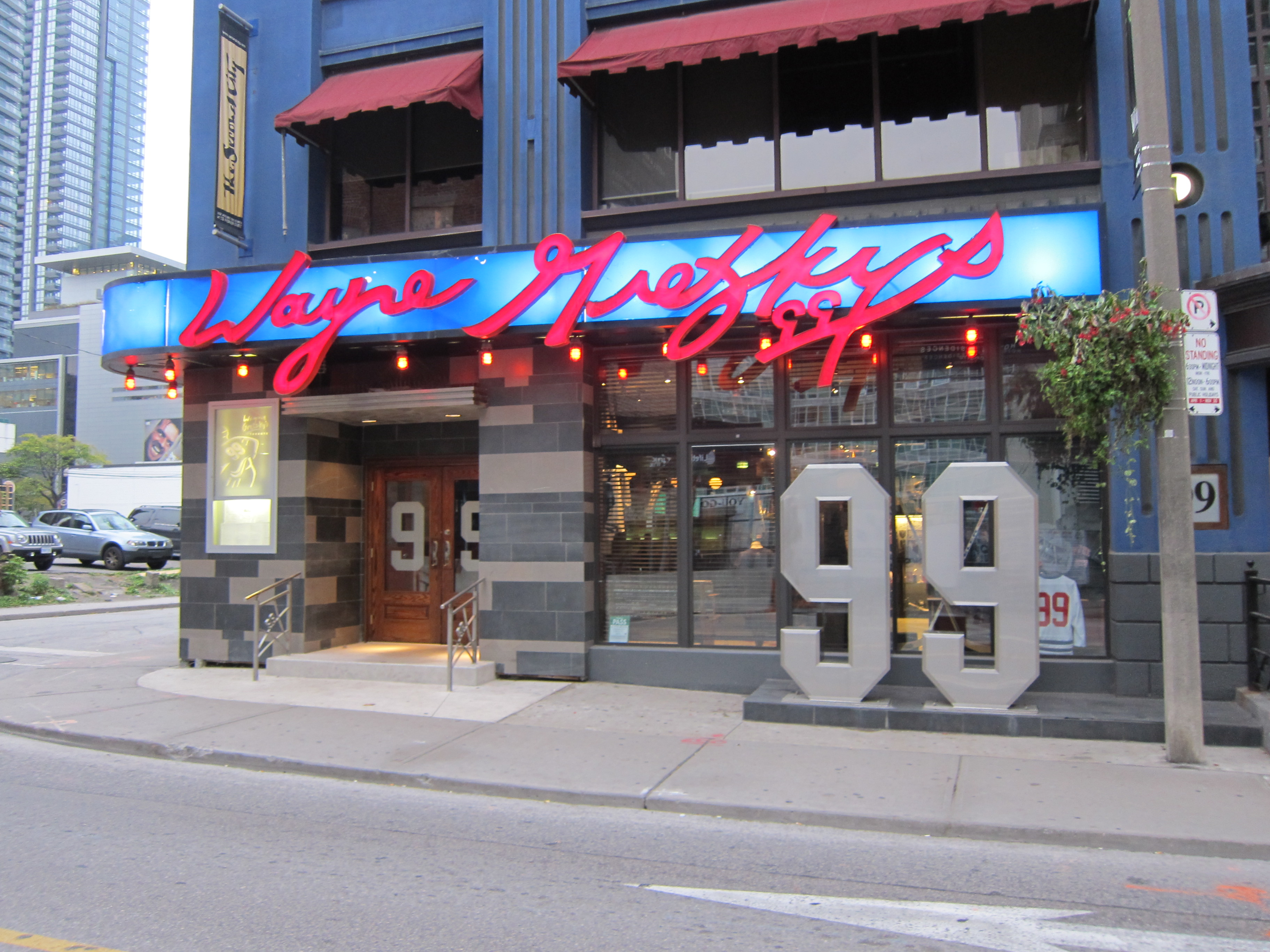
Wayne Gretzky's, downtown Toronto, pictured in 2014

In 1991, McNall purchased the Toronto Argonauts of the Canadian Football League (CFL) with Gretzky and John Candy as minority owners. The club won the Grey Cup championship in the first year of the partnership but struggled in the two following seasons, and the partnership sold the team before the 1994 season. Only McNall's name was engraved on the Grey Cup as team owner, but in November 2007, the CFL corrected the oversight, adding Gretzky's and Candy's names. In 1992, Gretzky and McNall partnered in an investment to buy a rare T206 cigarette card of Honus Wagner for US$451,000, later selling the card. It most recently sold for US$2.8 million. The pair also owned Thoroughbred race horses; one of them, Saumarez, won France's Prix de l'Arc de Triomphe in 1990. Gretzky was a board member and executive officer of the Hespeler Hockey Company.

Gretzky's appeal as a product endorser far surpassed that of other hockey players of his era. By 1995, he was among the five highest-paid athlete endorsers in North America, with deals from The Coca-Cola Company, Domino's Pizza, Sharp Corporation, and Upper Deck Company among others. Forbes estimates that Gretzky made US$93.8 million from 1990 to 1998. He has endorsed and launched a wide variety of products, from pillowcases to insurance. Gretzky is a partner in First Team Sports, a maker of sports equipment and Worldwide Roller Hockey, Inc., an operator of roller hockey rinks. The video game brand EA Sports included Gretzky in its 2010 title NHL Slapshot, and he had previously been an endorser for Page 44 Studios and Sony Computer Entertainment's video games Gretzky NHL 2005 and Gretzky NHL 06.

In 2017, as part-owner with Andrew Peller Ltd., Gretzky opened a winery and distillery named Wayne Gretzky Estates in Niagara-on-the-Lake, Ontario, with products labelled by the trademark No. 99. From 1993 to 2020, Gretzky and a business partner operated the Wayne Gretzky's restaurant near the Rogers Centre in downtown Toronto. Gretzky has other restaurants opened in 2016 at the Edmonton International Airport and named No. 99 Gretzky's Wine & Whisky, and in 2018 called Studio 99 at Rogers Place in Edmonton, Alberta.

=== Philanthropy ===
Gretzky and his wife co-founded the Wayne Gretzky Foundation in 2002, to help underprivileged youth participate in hockey. Gretzky has raised funds for the CNIB Foundation since 1995, and has been involved in the Make-A-Wish Foundation as an ambassador/board member for Ronald McDonald House Charities and Right To Play. In September 2024, he led NHL alumni support of the ALS super fund of former player Mark Kirton.

=== Books ===
Gretzky has written several books, including Gretzky: An Autobiography (1990), with Rick Reilly, and 99: My Life in Pictures (1999), with John Davidson and Dan Diamond. His most recent work, 99: Stories of the Game (2016), with Kirstie McLellan Day, was an in-depth look at the history of hockey. It was the best-selling Canadian book of 2016.

=== Political activity ===
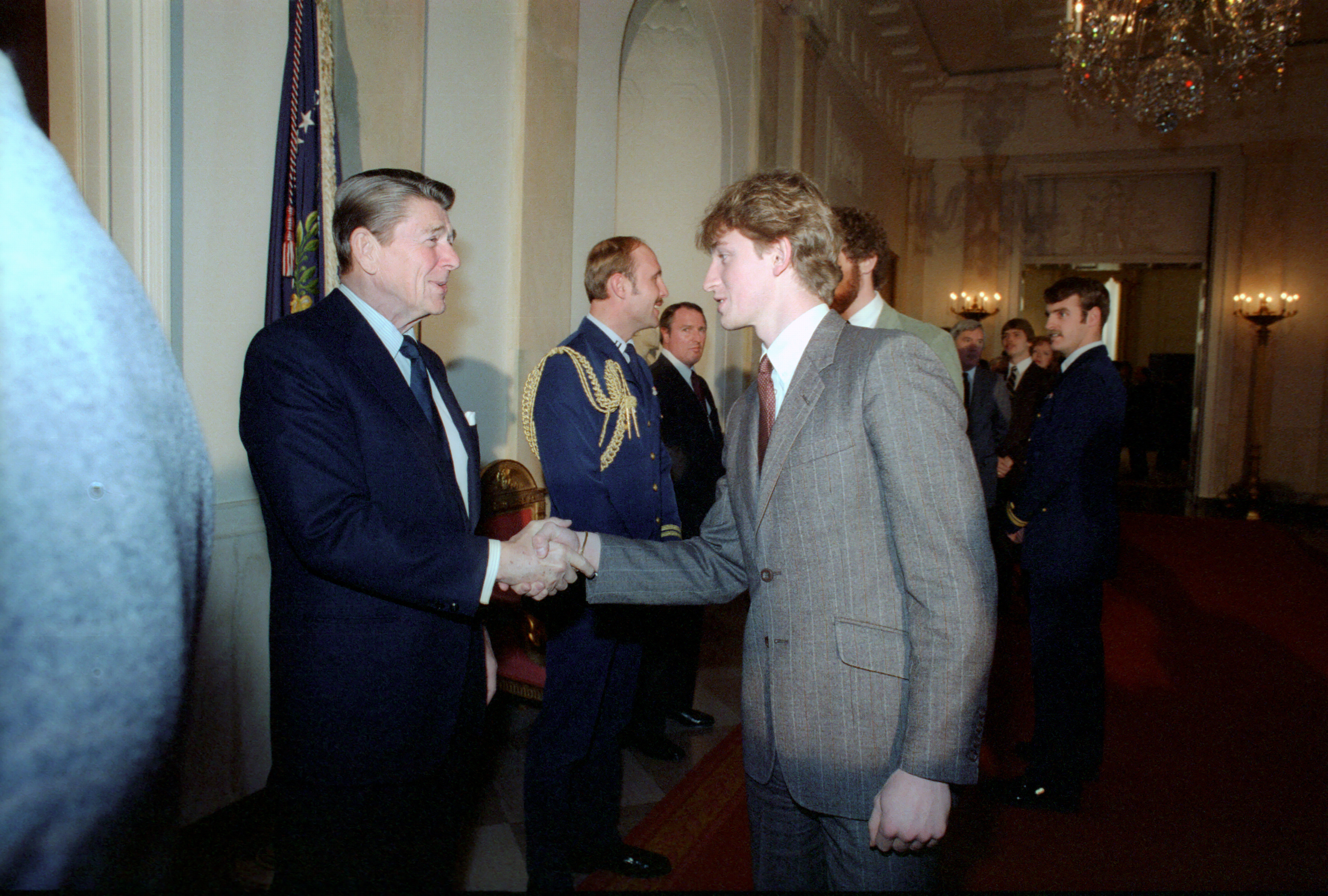
Gretzky with US President Ronald Reagan in 1982

Gretzky has aligned himself with the Conservative Party in Canada and Republican politicians in the United States.

In 2003, while not criticizing Canada for declining to participate in the invasion of Iraq, Gretzky praised US President George W. Bush and handling the conflict, saying: "the President of the United States is a great leader, I happen to think he's a wonderful man and if he believes what he's doing is right, I back him 100 per cent".

During the 2015 Canadian federal election, Gretzky endorsed Prime Minister Stephen Harper, and appeared at a Conservative Party campaign rally praising Harper as "wonderful to the country". As a non-resident, Gretzky came under some criticism for this endorsement. In 2014, Gretzky called Harper "one of the greatest prime ministers ever". In 2015, Gretzky endorsed Patrick Brown who won the leadership of the Progressive Conservative Party of Ontario.

Following the 2022 Russian invasion of Ukraine, Gretzky supported calls to ban Russian teams from international events. The following month, he shared a ceremonial puck-drop with a Ukrainian hockey player.

In 2024, Gretzky attended the victory party for Donald Trump during the 2024 United States presidential election. Trump subsequently suggested Gretzky should be prime minister of Canada. According to Trump, when he suggested Gretzky run for prime minister, Gretzky said "Am I going to run for prime minister or governor, you tell me." Trump replied, "I don't know, let's make it governor. I like it better." Gretzky's position also resulted in adverse reactions from fans when the NHL awarded Gretzky the honorary team captain for Canada at the 4 Nations Face-Off February 2025 finals. Gretzky did not wear a Team Canada jersey in his representation, unlike the American honorary captain, who wore a Team USA jersey. Gretzky also gave a "thumbs up" to the American team as he came on the ice, but did not give any similar gesture to the Canadian team. Following the 4-Nations Face-Off, a petition was started on Change.org calling for the renaming of Wayne Gretzky Drive in Edmonton due to some fans feeling Gretzky betrayed Canada.

== Legacy ==
=== Hockey ===
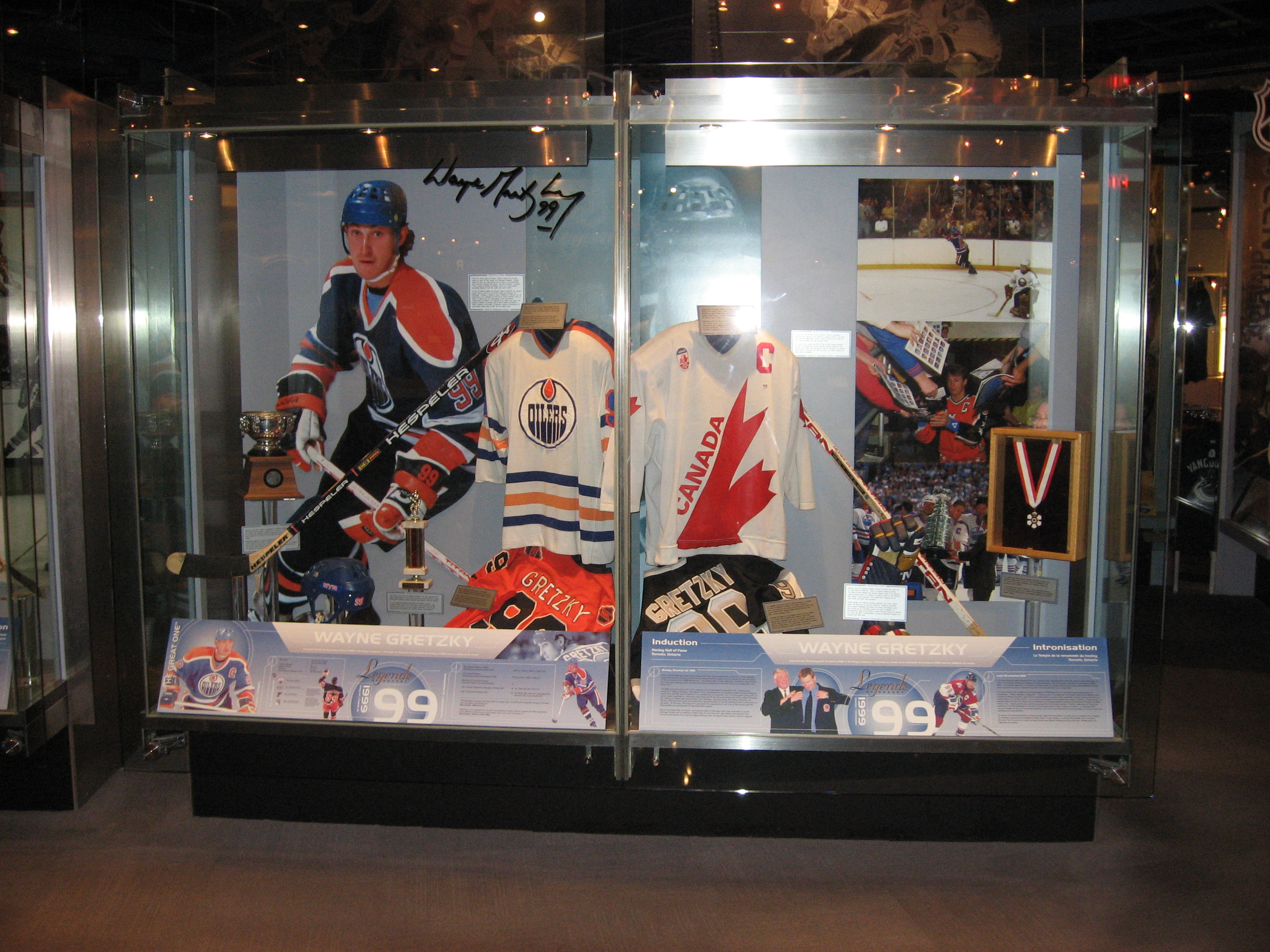
An exhibit on Gretzky at the Hockey Hall of Fame

Gretzky's career achievements include a record nine Hart Trophies as the most valuable player in the NHL. Between 1981 and 1994, he won the Art Ross Trophy, presented to the NHL's season points leader, 10 times. Gretzky was named the MVP of the Stanley Cup playoffs in 1985 and 1988, receiving the Conn Smythe Trophy. In addition, he earned the Lester B. Pearson Award (now Ted Lindsay Award) on five occasions; the award is given to the NHL's "most outstanding player", as determined by National Hockey League Players' Association members. The Lady Byng Trophy, awarded for sportsmanship and performance, was presented to Gretzky five times between 1980 and 1999.

Gretzky was inducted into the Hockey Hall of Fame in 1999, and into the IIHF Hall of Fame in 2000. The NHL retired Gretzky's number 99 across the entire league on February 6, 2000. He was an inaugural recipient of the Order of Hockey in Canada in 2012. Throughout his career Gretzky amassed 894 goals, 1,963 assists, for 2,857 total points in 1,487 regular-season games. His 1,963 assists remain the NHL career record and his 2,857 career points lead all players, with the second closest being Jaromir Jagr's 1,921.

Gretzky is often considered the greatest hockey player of all time. He was named one of the 100 Greatest NHL Players by the league in 2017. He was named the greatest of all time by the Hockey News in 1998, and by the Athletic in 2023.

The Wayne Gretzky International Award is presented by the United States Hockey Hall of Fame to honour international individuals who have made major contributions to the growth and advancement of hockey in the United States. The Wayne Gretzky 99 Award is awarded annually to the Most Valuable Player in the Ontario Hockey League playoffs. The Wayne Gretzky Trophy is awarded annually to the playoff champion of the OHL's Western Conference. The Edmonton Minor Hockey Association also has an award named for Gretzky.

In May 2021, one of his 1979 O-Pee-Chee hockey cards sold for US$3.75 million.

=== Order of Canada ===
In 1984, Gretzky was appointed an Officer of the Order of Canada, the mid-level grade of the order. The citation describes him as:

A superlative athlete who has devoted his life to his sport of hockey. ... His astonishing talent has dazzled fans and players and his gentlemanly conduct and sportsmanship are an inspiration to his teammates, opponents and youngsters learning the game.

The citation also mentions his philanthropy, particularly in support of CNIB Foundation.

Gretzky did not come to Ottawa for the investiture in the Order for fourteen years. When he came, his investiture was conducted in private.

Gretzky was promoted to the highest rank, a Companion of the Order of Canada, in 2009. The citation for the promotion describes him as

... an outstanding example of community engagement and generosity. ... Off the ice, he uses his celebrity status to make a difference in the lives of others through numerous charitable organizations and community initiatives, including a foundation that helps disadvantaged youth play hockey and an after-school program for children with autism. He continues to be a role model for countless young people around the world and is a proud ambassador for Canada.

As of 2025, he has not attended in Ottawa for the investiture as a Companion. His agent stated in 2015 that Gretzky has had trouble fitting one into his schedule. Investitures are held four times a year. Gretzky has been in Canada at various times in the past fifteen years, including for political events.

One of the leading experts on Canada's honours system, Christopher McCreery, has criticized Gretzky for not attending an investiture: "I've probably met 1,000 recipients of the Order of Canada. It's a highlight of their lives—their country saying thank you." McCreery added that not attending the investiture is "insulting to the others who get them. All are supposed to be in the same category, yet they think they are on a plane above everybody else".

A spokesperson for the Governor General's office confirmed in 2015 that the office had made attempts to arrange for an investiture. She also stated that between 1967 and 2015, there had been 467 individuals appointed as Companions. She added: "Of this number, there are five Companions, including Mr. Gretzky, who have not been invested. Two were appointed within the last six months. Two others are deceased."

== Career statistics ==
=== Regular season and playoffs ===
Figures in boldface italics are NHL records.

			Regular season					Playoffs
Season	Team	League	GP	G	A	Pts	PIM	GP	G	A	Pts	PIM
1975–76	Toronto Nationals	MetJHL	28	27	33	60	7	—	—	—	—	—
1976–77	Seneca Nationals	MetJHL	32	36	36	72	35	23	40	35	75	—
1976–77	Peterborough Petes	OMJHL	3	0	3	3	0	—	—	—	—	—
1977–78	Sault Ste. Marie Greyhounds	OMJHL	64	70	112	182	14	13	6	20	26	0
1978–79	Indianapolis Racers	WHA	8	3	3	6	0	—	—	—	—	—
1978–79	Edmonton Oilers	WHA	72	43	61	104	19	13	10	10	20	2
1979–80	Edmonton Oilers	NHL	79	51	86	137	21	3	2	1	3	0
1980–81	Edmonton Oilers	NHL	80	55	109	164	28	9	7	14	21	4
1981–82	Edmonton Oilers	NHL	80	**92**	120	212	26	5	5	7	12	8
1982–83	Edmonton Oilers	NHL	80	71	125	196	59	16	12	26	38	4
1983–84	Edmonton Oilers	NHL	74	87	118	205	39	19	13	22	35	12
1984–85	Edmonton Oilers	NHL	80	73	135	208	52	18	17	30	**47**	4
1985–86	Edmonton Oilers	NHL	80	52	**163**	**215**	46	10	8	11	19	2
1986–87	Edmonton Oilers	NHL	79	62	121	183	28	21	5	29	34	6
1987–88	Edmonton Oilers	NHL	64	40	109	149	24	19	12	31	43	16
1988–89	Los Angeles Kings	NHL	78	54	114	168	26	11	5	17	22	0
1989–90	Los Angeles Kings	NHL	73	40	102	142	42	7	3	7	10	0
1990–91	Los Angeles Kings	NHL	78	41	122	163	16	12	4	11	15	2
1991–92	Los Angeles Kings	NHL	74	31	90	121	34	6	2	5	7	2
1992–93	Los Angeles Kings	NHL	45	16	49	65	6	24	15	25	40	4
1993–94	Los Angeles Kings	NHL	81	38	92	130	20	—	—	—	—	—
1994–95	Los Angeles Kings	NHL	48	11	37	48	6	—	—	—	—	—
1995–96	Los Angeles Kings	NHL	62	15	66	81	32	—	—	—	—	—
1995–96	St. Louis Blues	NHL	18	8	13	21	2	13	2	14	16	0
1996–97	New York Rangers	NHL	82	25	72	97	28	15	10	10	20	2
1997–98	New York Rangers	NHL	82	23	67	90	28	—	—	—	—	—
1998–99	New York Rangers	NHL	70	9	53	62	14	—	—	—	—	—
WHA totals			80	46	64	110	19	13	10	10	20	2
NHL totals			1,487	894	1,963	2,857	577	208	122	260	382	66

=== International ===
Year	Team	Event	GP	G	A	Pts	PIM
1978	Canada	WJC	6	8	9	17	2
1981	Canada	CC	7	5	7	12	2
1982	Canada	WC	10	6	8	14	0
1984	Canada	CC	8	5	7	12	2
1987	Canada	CC	9	3	18	21	2
1991	Canada	CC	7	4	8	12	2
1996	Canada	WCH	8	3	4	7	2
1998	Canada	OLY	6	0	4	4	2
Junior totals			6	8	9	17	2
Senior totals			55	26	56	82	12

=== All-Star games ===
Year	Location	G	A	Pts
1980	Detroit	0	0	0
1981	Inglewood	0	1	1
1982	Landover	1	0	1
1983	Uniondale	4	0	4
1984	East Rutherford	1	0	1
1985	Calgary	1	0	1
1986	Hartford	1	0	1
1988	St. Louis	1	0	1
1989	Edmonton	1	2	3
1990	Pittsburgh	0	0	0
1991	Chicago	1	0	1
1992	Philadelphia	1	2	3
1993	Montreal	0	0	0
1994	New York	0	2	2
1996	Boston	0	0	0
1997	San Jose	0	1	1
1998	Vancouver	0	2	2
1999	Tampa	1	2	3
18 All-Star games		13	12	25

== Head coaching record ==
Team	Year	Regular season						Postseason			
Team	Year	G	W	L	OTL	Pts	Finish	W	L	Win%	Result
PHX	2005–06	82	38	39	5	81	5th in Pacific	—	—	—	Missed playoffs
PHX	2006–07	82	31	46	5	67	5th in Pacific	—	—	—	Missed playoffs
PHX	2007–08	82	38	37	7	83	4th in Pacific	—	—	—	Missed playoffs
PHX	2008–09	82	36	39	7	79	4th in Pacific	—	—	—	Missed playoffs
Total		328	143	161	24						

== See also ==
- List of NHL statistical leaders

== Bibliography ==
- Blevins, Dave (2012). The Sports Hall of Fame Encyclopedia: Baseball, Basketball, Football, Hockey, Soccer, Volume 1. Lanham, Maryland: Scarecrow Press. ISBN 978-0-8108-6130-5.
- Cole, Stephen (2004). The Best of Hockey Night in Canada. Toronto: McArthur & Company. ISBN 978-1-55278-408-2.
- Davis, Reyn (1999). "WHA Teen Sensation". In Dryden, Steve (ed.). Total Gretzky: The Magic, The Legend, The Numbers. Toronto: McClelland & Stewart Inc. pp. 51–52. ISBN 978-0-7710-4177-8.
- Dryden, Ken (2013). The Game. Toronto: HarperCollins. ISBN 978-1443427920.
- Dryden, Steve (1998). "No Higher Level". In Dryden, Steve (ed.). The Top 100 NHL Players of All Time. Toronto, Ontario: McClelland & Stewart. ISBN 978-0-7710-4175-4.
- Duplacey, James (2000). The Official Rules of Hockey: An Anecdotal Look at the Rules of Hockey—and How They Came to Be. New York: Globe Pequot. ISBN 978-1-58574-052-9.
- Gretzky, Walter (2001). On Family, Hockey and Healing. Random House Canada. ISBN 978-0-679-31114-0.
- Gretzky, Wayne (1998). "Foreword". In Dryden, Steve (ed.). The Top 100 NHL Players of All Time. Toronto, Ontario: McClelland & Stewart. ISBN 978-0-7710-4175-4.
- Gretzky, Wayne; Reilly, Rick (1990). Gretzky: An Autobiography. New York: HarperCollins. ISBN 978-0-06-016339-6.
- Gretzky, Wayne; Davidson, John (1999). Diamond, Dan (ed.). 99: My Life in Pictures. Toronto, Ontario: Total Sports Canada. ISBN 978-0-920445-67-9.
- Gzowski, Peter (2001). Barker, Edna (ed.). A Peter Gzowski Reader. Toronto: McClelland & Stewart. ISBN 978-0-7710-3695-8.
- Gzowski, Peter (2004). The game of our lives. Surrey, BC, Canada: Heritage House Publishing Ltd. ISBN 978-1-894384-59-9.
- Hunter, Douglas (1997). Champions: The Illustrated History of Hockey's Greatest Dynasties. Chicago: Triumph Books. ISBN 978-1-57243-213-0.
- Ireland, Joanne (2017). 100 Things Oilers Fans Should Know & Do Before They Die. Chicago: Triumph Books. ISBN 978-1-63319-902-6. (Unpaginated version consulted online via Google Books)
- Jenish, D'Arcy (2009). The Montreal Canadiens: 100 Years of Glory. Doubleday. ISBN 978-0-385-66325-0.
- MacGregor, Roy (1999). "Fortune Smiled Upon Us". In Dryden, Steve (ed.). Total Gretzky: The Magic, The Legend, The Numbers. Toronto, Ontario: McClelland & Stewart Inc. pp. 14–36. ISBN 978-0-7710-4177-8.
- Morrison, Scott (2008). Hockey Night in Canada: My Greatest Day. Toronto: Key Porter Books. ISBN 978-1-55470-086-8.
- Potvin, Denis (1999). "You Can't Hit What You Can't Find". In Dryden, Steve (ed.). Total Gretzky: The Magic, The Legend, The Numbers. Toronto, Ontario: McClelland & Stewart. pp. 89–91. ISBN 978-0-7710-4177-8.
- Redmond, Gerald (1993). Wayne Gretzky: The Great One. Toronto, Ontario: ECW Press. ISBN 978-1-55022-190-9.
- Surgent, Scott (2004). The Complete Historical and Statistical Reference to the World Hockey Association: 1972–1979. Xaler Press. ISBN 978-0-9644774-4-5.
- Taylor, Jim (1994). Wayne Gretzky: The authorized pictorial biography. Vancouver, British Columbia: Opus Productions. ISBN 978-1-55110-263-4.
- Weekes, Don (1999). The Great Gretzky Trivia Book. Vancouver, British Columbia: Greystone Books. ISBN 978-1-55054-752-8.
- Willes, Ed (2004). The Rebel League: The Short and Unruly Life of the World Hockey Association. Toronto, Ontario: McClelland and Stewart. ISBN 978-0-7710-8947-3.
- Willes, Ed (2007). Gretzky to Lemieux: The Story of the 1987 Canada Cup. Toronto: McClelland & Stewart. ISBN 978-0-7710-8942-8.

Sporting positions
Preceded by Rick Bowness	Head coach of the Phoenix Coyotes; 2005–2009	Succeeded by Dave Tippett
Preceded by Shayne Corson	St. Louis Blues captain 1996	Succeeded by Chris Pronger
Preceded by Dave Taylor	Los Angeles Kings captain 1989–1996; Luc Robitaille, 1992–93	Succeeded by Rob Blake
Preceded by Lee Fogolin	Edmonton Oilers captain 1983–1988	Succeeded by Mark Messier
Awards and achievements
Preceded by Marcel Dionne; Mario Lemieux; Mario Lemieux	Winner of the Art Ross Trophy; 1981–1987; 1990, 1991; 1994	Succeeded by Mario Lemieux; Mario Lemieux; Jaromir Jagr
Preceded by Mark Messier; Ron Hextall	Winner of the Conn Smythe Trophy; 1985; 1988	Succeeded by Patrick Roy; Al MacInnis
Preceded by Bryan Trottier; Mario Lemieux	Winner of the Hart Memorial Trophy; 1980–1987; 1989	Succeeded by Mario Lemieux; Mark Messier
Preceded by Bob MacMillan; Brett Hull; Pierre Turgeon; Ron Francis	Winner of the Lady Byng Trophy; 1980; 1991, 1992; 1994; 1999	Succeeded by Rick Kehoe; Pierre Turgeon; Ron Francis; Pavol Demitra
Preceded by Charlie Huddy; Mark Howe	Winner of the NHL Plus/Minus Award; 1984–1985; 1987	Succeeded by Mark Howe; Brad McCrimmon
Olympic Games
Preceded by Li Ning	Final Olympic torchbearer Vancouver 2010; With: Catriona Le May Doan, Steve Nash and Nancy Greene	Succeeded by Callum Airlie, Jordan Duckitt, Desiree Henry, Katie Kirk, Cameron MacRitchie, Aidan Reynolds, and Adelle Tracey
Preceded by Stefania Belmondo	Final Winter Olympic torchbearer Vancouver 2010; With: Catriona Le May Doan, Steve Nash and Nancy Greene	Succeeded by Irina Rodnina and Vladislav Tretiak
