= Statue of Wayne Gretzky =

Sculpture in Los Angeles, California, U.S.

- The sculpture in 2022
- Artist: Erik Blome
- Subject: Wayne Gretzky
- Location: Los Angeles, California, U.S.; 34°2′36.6″N 118°15′58.2″W

A statue of Canadian ice hockey player Wayne Gretzky by Erik Blome is installed outside Los Angeles' Crypto.com Arena, in the U.S. state of California. The bronze sculpture depicts Gretzky wearing his Los Angeles Kings uniform. His statue was unveiled in 2002.
