= Jake Milford =

Canadian ice hockey player and manager (1914–1984)

- Born: July 29, 1914; Charlottetown, Prince Edward Island, Canada
- Died: December 24, 1984 (aged 70); Vancouver, British Columbia, Canada
- Occupations: Former general manager of the Los Angeles Kings (1973–77) and the Vancouver Canucks (1977–84)

John Calverley "Jake" Milford (July 29, 1914 – December 24, 1984) was a general manager in the National Hockey League.

In the early sixties, Milford built the Brandon Wheat Kings of the Manitoba Junior Hockey League into a powerhouse. They won three titles in a row, and four in five years.

Milford was the general manager of the Los Angeles Kings from 1973 to 1977, where he led the Kings to a franchise record of 105 points in a season. After 1977, he went on to manage the Vancouver Canucks, leading them to a Stanley Cup finals appearance in 1982. He was then promoted to Senior Vice-President of the club, a position which he held until his sudden death on Christmas Eve 1984, just a month after his Hall of Fame induction. For the remainder of the 1984–85 season, the Vancouver Canucks wore a "JCM" patch on their sweaters.

The Jake Milford Trophy, the coach of the year award in the Central Hockey League, is named after Milford.

Milford died in 1984 of pancreatic cancer at Shaughnessy Hospital in Vancouver.

== Awards and achievements ==
- Inducted into the Hockey Hall of Fame in 1984
- Honoured Member of the Manitoba Hockey Hall of Fame

| Preceded by Phil Maloney | General Manager of the Vancouver Canucks; 1977–82 | Succeeded by Harry Neale |
| Preceded by Larry Regan | General Manager of the Los Angeles Kings; 1973–77 | Succeeded by George Maguire |
