= List of Los Angeles Kings general managers =

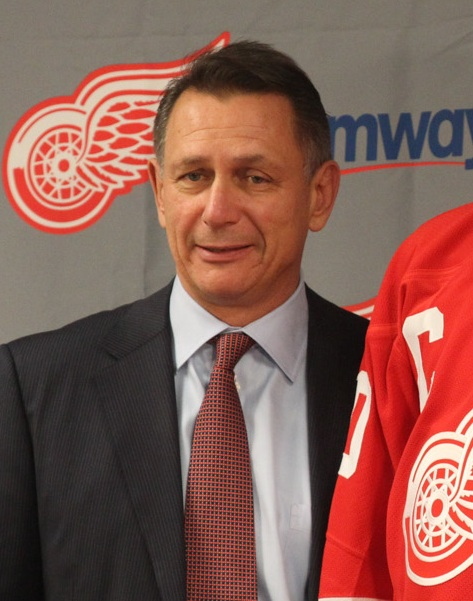
Ken Holland is the current general manager of the Los Angeles Kings.

The Los Angeles Kings are an American professional ice hockey team based in Los Angeles, California. They play in the Pacific Division of the Western Conference in the National Hockey League (NHL). The team joined the NHL in 1967 as an expansion team with five other teams, and won their first Stanley Cup in 2012. Having first played at The Forum, the Kings have played their home games at the Crypto.com Arena (formerly Staples Center) since 1999. The team has had ten general managers since their inception.

== Key ==
Key of terms and definitions
Term	Definition
No.	Number of general managers^{[a]}
Ref(s)	References
–	Does not apply
†	Elected to the Hockey Hall of Fame in the Builder category

== General managers ==
General managers of the Los Angeles Kings
No.	Name	Hired	Fired	Days	Playoff App	Div Titles	Conf Titles	S.C. Finals Wins/App	Ref(s)
1	Larry Regan	June 8, 1967	November 26, 1973	2,363	2	0	0	0	
2	Jake Milford†	December 17, 1973	May 26, 1977	1,256	4	0	0	0	
3	George Maguire	May 26, 1977	January 30, 1984	2,440	5	0	0	0	
4	Rogie Vachon	January 30, 1984	June 25, 1992	3,069	7	1	0	0	
5	Nick Beverley	June 25, 1992	May 18, 1994	692	1	0	1	0/1	
6	Sam McMaster	May 24, 1994	April 22, 1997	1,064	0	0	0	0	
7	Dave Taylor	April 22, 1997	April 18, 2006	3,283	4	0	0	0	
8	Dean Lombardi	April 21, 2006	April 10, 2017	4,007	6	0	2	2/2	
9	Rob Blake	April 10, 2017	May 5, 2025	2,947	5	0	0	0	
10	Ken Holland	May 14, 2025		439	0	0	0	0	

== See also ==
- List of NHL general managers

== Notes ==
- ^{a} A running total of the number of general managers of the franchise. Thus any general manager who has two or more separate terms as general manager is only counted once.
