= Rogie Vachon =

Canadian ice hockey player (born 1945)

- Hockey Hall of Fame, 2016
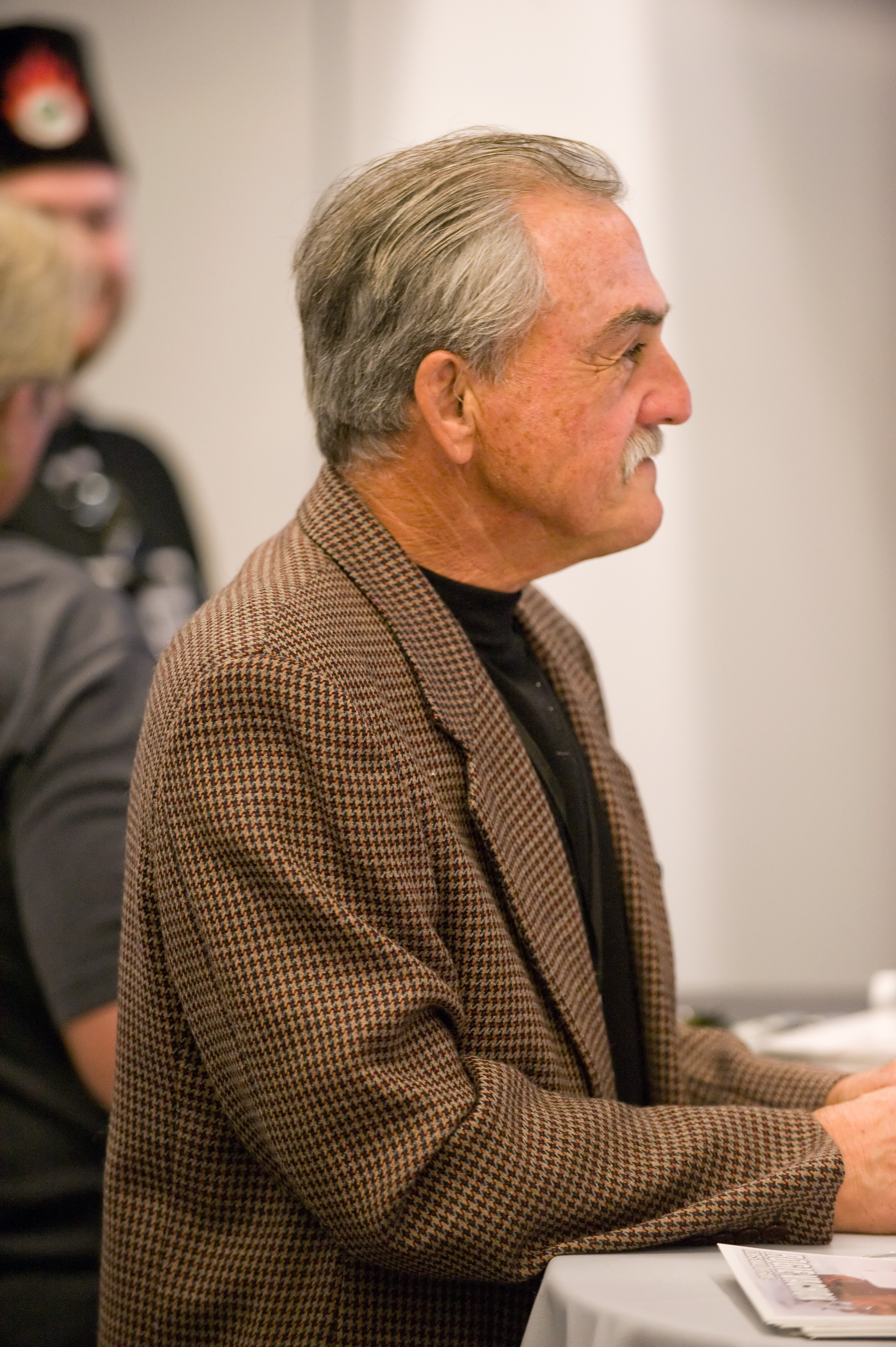
- Vachon in 2008
- Born: September 8, 1945 (age 81) Palmarolle, Quebec, Canada
- Height: 5 ft 8 in (173 cm)
- Weight: 160 lb (73 kg; 11 st 6 lb)
- Position: Goaltender
- Caught: Left
- Played for: Montreal Canadiens; Los Angeles Kings; Detroit Red Wings; Boston Bruins
- National team: Canada
- Playing career: 1965–1982
Medal record
Representing Canada
Men's ice hockey
Canada Cup
Gold medal – first place	1976 Canada	Ice hockey

Rogatien Rosaire Vachon (vah-SHON; born September 8, 1945) is a Canadian former professional ice hockey goaltender. He played 16 seasons for the Montreal Canadiens, Los Angeles Kings, Detroit Red Wings and Boston Bruins in the National Hockey League (NHL) from 1967 to 1982.

Nicknamed "Rogie the Goalie", Vachon was called up to the Canadiens in February of the 1966–67 season, which saw him win 11 of 19 starts. He became the primary starting goaltender for all but one game of the 1967 Stanley Cup playoffs run, which saw the team lose to the Toronto Maple Leafs in the Stanley Cup Final. Sharing the duties with Gump Worsley the following season, which saw the two allow the fewest number of goals for the entire season to win the Vezina Trophy. He started only two playoff games but the team won the Stanley Cup Final for his first championship. The following season saw him inserted as the starting goaltender for the final seven games of the playoff run, only losing once in that run as Vachon won his second championship. He took on the starting duties for the following two seasons but was replaced by Ken Dryden late in the 1970–71 season as the team rolled to the Cup. After one game in the 1971–72 season, he was traded to the Kings.

In seven seasons with the team, he won 171 total games, which included a career-high 33 in the 1976–77 season; he was selected to the NHL All-Star Game three times and the NHL Second All-Star Team twice, all with the Kings. He represented Canada for the only time internationally in the 1976 Canada Cup, which saw him win six of his seven starts as they defeated the Soviet Union in the finals. He departed the Kings as a free agent in the 1978–79 season for the Red Wings, with the one highlight being him winning his 300th game in 1979, becoming the eighth goaltender to reach the milestone in league history. After being traded in the summer of 1980 to Boston, he spent two seasons with the team before announcing his retirement in 1982.

He retired with the fifth-most wins in league history and as one of only two players with twelve 20-win seasons in league history next to Tony Esposito. After his playing career ended, he served as general manager of the Kings from 1984 to 1992; in 1985, his jersey was retired by the Kings, the first player to be given the honor in franchise history. In 2016, he was inducted into the Hockey Hall of Fame.

== Early life ==
Vachon was born in a family with seven siblings and grew up on a dairy farm in Palmarolle, Canada. The kids would sneak water from the well to create a hockey rink, with only cows as the audience. He was persuaded to play senior level hockey at the age of 14 by a coach who was in need of a goaltender.

== Playing career ==
=== Montreal Canadiens ===
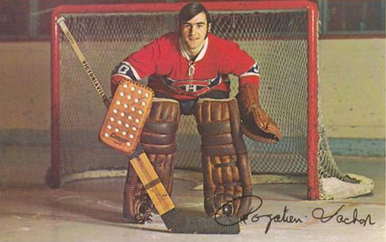
Vachon with the Montreal Canadiens in 1969

Vachon entered the National Hockey League in February of the 1966–67 season with the Montreal Canadiens when Gump Worsley, the starting goaltender, suffered an injury. He played in nineteen games down the stretch for the team, going 11–3–5. Vachon recalled his first game as a goaltender on February 18, 1967:

I didn't know I was going to play that night. Toe just handed me the puck before the warmup and said, 'You're in.' I was sort of in shock, still trying to pull myself together when Gordie broke in alone from the blue line. Luckily I stopped it. And I joked with Gordie that this save probably kept me in the League for years.

He led the Canadiens as the starting goaltender for the 1967 Stanley Cup playoffs, the last one to be played between four teams. He led them to a sweep of the New York Rangers before encountering the Toronto Maple Leafs in the Stanley Cup Final. Punch Imlach, the coach of the Leafs, referred to Vachon as a junior B goaltender in an attempt to rattle him during the series. The two teams split the first four games before game five saw Vachon give up four goals in two periods of play as the Maple Leafs won 4-1. Worsley was inserted for the rest of the game and the subsequent game six, which Toronto won to win the Cup.

Vachon played 39 games in the 1967–68 season and won 23 of them. He and Worsley shared the Vezina Trophy, with a combined 2.26 GAA, the lowest since the 1958-59 season. Montreal won the Stanley Cup that season and in the following 1968–69 season as well. During the 1969–70 season, Worsley was traded to the Minnesota North Stars and Vachon got the starting job, but the Canadiens missed the playoffs.

The emergence of Ken Dryden in the latter end of the 1970–71 led to Vachon requesting a trade, which occurred on November 4, 1971.

=== Los Angeles Kings ===
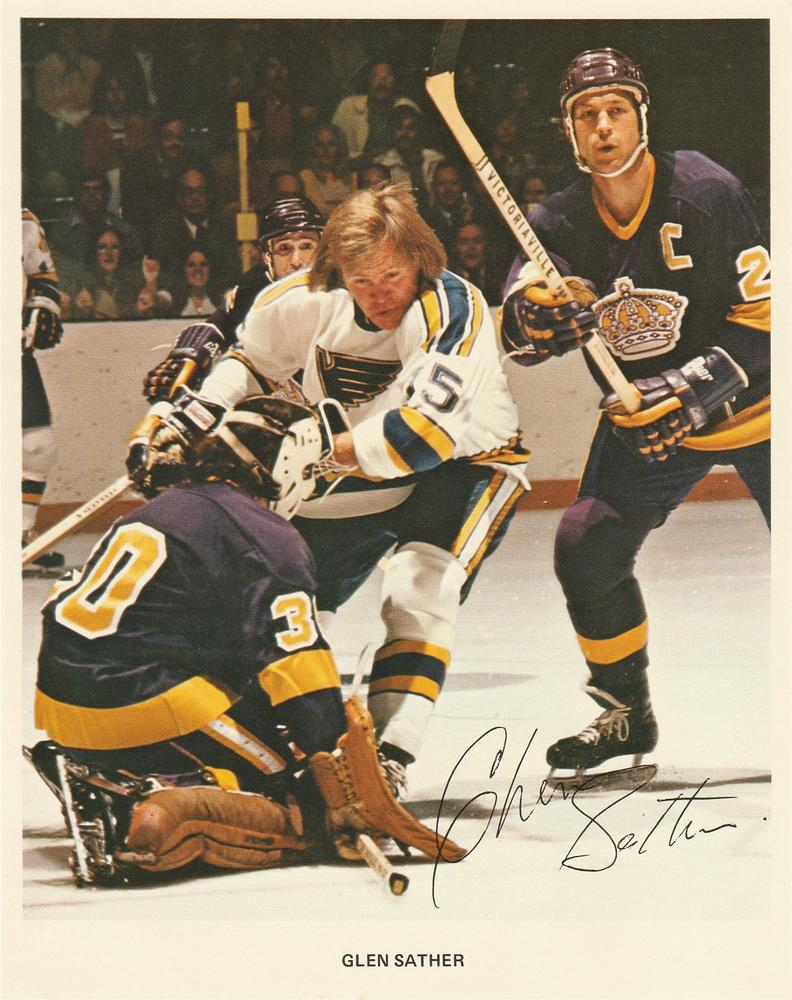
Vachon in net during the 1973–74 season with the Los Angeles Kings. Glen Sather is the opposing player.

After losing the Canadiens' starting job to rookie Ken Dryden early in 1971–72, Vachon requested a trade to a team that needed a starter, which happened on November 4, 1971, when he was sent to the Los Angeles Kings for Denis DeJordy, Dale Hoganson, Noel Price and Doug Robinson.

It was with the Kings that Vachon had the finest moments of his NHL career. He was runner-up for the Vezina Trophy in 1974–75, and he was named to the NHL second All-Star team in 1974-75 and 1976-77. He was named the team MVP four times between 1973 and 1977. In a February 15 game in the 1976–77 season, he was almost the first goaltender to be given credit for scoring a goal when the New York Islanders scored on themselves during a delayed penalty; however, after video review, the goal was credited to Vic Venasky after it was determined that Vachon was the second-to-last Kings player to touch the puck before it went in the net. The 1974–75 Kings team saw Vachon lead the league in save percentage (.927) with a career-best 2.24 goals-against-average (GAA) and finish second in the Hart Memorial Trophy voting for his play to go along with a season of 105 points (a franchise record tied but not surpassed) with only 17 total losses.

Vachon also set many goaltending records in Kings history that still stand. His number 30 was the first number retired by the Kings, in a ceremony on February 14, 1985. He has since served in a variety of executive positions with the Kings organization.

=== Canada Cup ===
In 1976, Vachon was chosen to play for Canada, along with fellow goaltenders Gerry Cheevers and Glenn Resch. He was given the top spot and played in every game of the tournament. He recorded six wins and one loss, two shutouts and a 1.39 goals against average. Canada won the tournament, and Vachon was selected for the All-Star team and named team MVP.

=== Detroit Red Wings ===
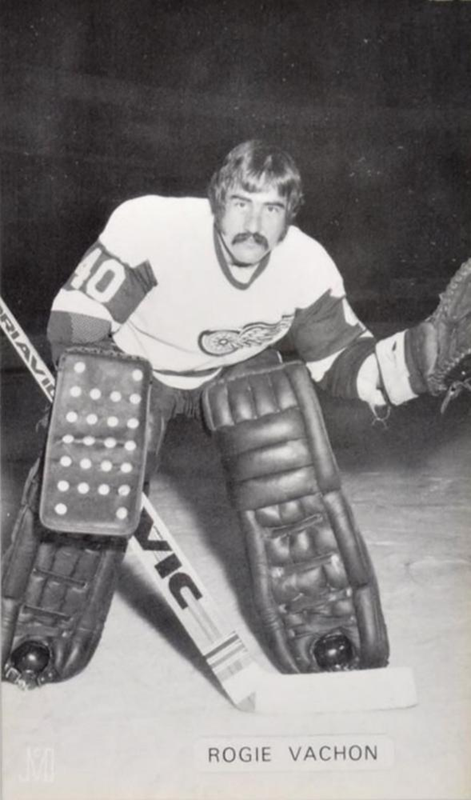
Vachon with the Detroit Red Wings c. 1978

Vachon became a restricted free agent following the 1977–78 season and signed with the Detroit Red Wings. The five-year deal paid Vachon $1.9 million and made him the league's highest paid goaltender. Vachon struggled from the beginning in Detroit. In his first game, he managed just nine saves against 14 shots in a game Detroit lost 5–4. As the year wore on, things did not improve for Vachon. Red Wings coach Bobby Kromm told Sports Illustrated: "When we signed Vachon, we thought we'd improved our club and give ourselves as good a 1-2 goaltending punch as there was in hockey. But it hasn't worked out that way." Further complicating things was the distraction that Vachon's signing created for the hockey club. Because he was a restricted free agent, the Red Wings were required to give compensation to the Los Angeles Kings, Vachon's former club. An arbitrator ruled that young centre Dale McCourt, whom the Red Wings had selected first overall in the 1977 NHL amateur draft, would go to the Kings. McCourt, who had led the Red Wings in scoring as a rookie in the 1977–78 season, refused to report to Los Angeles and sued the league.

In his first season with the Wings, Vachon allowed a goal more per game than he had the previous season, and in his second season he continued to struggle, posting numbers below his career averages. To his credit, he gained the distinction of recording the Red Wings' first victory in their new home, the Joe Louis Arena. He requested a trade after the 1979–80 season ended.

=== Boston Bruins ===
After two disappointing seasons in Detroit, the Red Wings traded Vachon to the Boston Bruins in the summer of 1980 for fellow netminder Gilles Gilbert. In Boston, Vachon served as a mentor to rookie goalies Marco Baron and Jim Craig, who had starred for the US National Team at the 1980 Winter Olympics. Vachon played 53 games for the Bruins and improved his numbers marginally from his time in Detroit; he also won more games than he lost for his first time since leaving Los Angeles. However, in the playoffs, things went poorly as the Bruins were swept in three games by the Minnesota North Stars and surrendered twenty goals in the process. Vachon allowed five goals in the first game, then gave up six in game two before getting pulled. He gave up five more goals in game three and ended the playoffs with a 5.85 goals against average. In the 1981–82 season, Baron took over the starting job from Vachon, who played 38 games as the back-up. Vachon's final NHL appearance came in the 1982 playoffs, when he played one period in relief of starter Mike Moffat in a 7–2 loss to the Quebec Nordiques. He faced just three shots in twenty minutes and allowed a power-play goal to Peter Stastny. Vachon hung up his pads for good six days later.

== Post-playing career ==
In February 1983, Vachon became an assistant coach in charge of goaltenders. Three months later, he signed a deal to become an assistant coach on a full-time basis to replace Brad Selwood.

In the middle of the 1983–84 season, Vachon was approached by Kings owner Jerry Buss with an offer to be general manager. On January 30, 1984, he was formally hired to be the general manager of the Kings, succeeding George Maguire. In his first full season as GM for the 1984–85 campaign, he approached Pat Quinn, a former teammate with him on the Houston Apollos who had just finished his studies at law school; Quinn coached the next three seasons but resigned. It was Vachon that decided to oblige the request of Marcel Dionne to be traded (much to Dionne's surprise, as he did not expect it to go so quickly) in March 1987. The following summer saw him oversee the acquisition of Wayne Gretzky from the Edmonton Oilers. He also served as interim head coach of the Kings on three separate occasions.

In June 1992, he was replaced as GM for assistant Nick Beverley and given a promotion to serve assistant to the chairman under team owner Bruce McNall, although the job effectively became a position dedicated to public relations. He was named team president in 1995 and served for a season. He served as a team ambassador for the team until 2008, although he has made occasional appearances for the team since, such as handing off the Kings Stanley Cup champion banner with Marcel Dionne for the home opener in 2014.

== Legacy ==
Known for his great reflexes and quick glove hand, Vachon was considered one of the premier one-on-one goaltenders of his era. He never allowed a goal on a penalty shot in his entire career. He was considered a "transformative" figure for the Kings as their first star player in a time where only a fraction of the games were broadcast and only on the road. Longtime Kings broadcaster Bob Miller noted his importance to the team:

You see someone who is going to be on the ice the whole game and make some of the acrobatic saves he would make, so he was a huge factor in keeping the team here and keeping attendance fairly good. [The attendance] wasn’t great in those days, but I think he was a factor for most people came to the games. You always felt with Rogie in goal you always had a chance to win the game and even if you were playing a strong team. The Kings weren’t a strong team at that time but you had a chance in those games. It was like putting your best pitcher on the mound in a game seven. You have a chance to win it. I think he had the fastest glove hand I’d seen. He wasn’t huge stature wise like goalies are today. I guess for those years he was a stereotypical type goaltender as far as size and weight but he had great agility and was the first real superstar the Kings had in my opinion.

Twelve of Vachon's sixteen seasons saw him 20 games, which was tied with Tony Esposito for the most in league history at the time he retired.

On June 27, 2016, 34 years after retirement, Vachon was announced for induction into the Hockey Hall of Fame, much to his surprise. He was formally inducted in a ceremony on November 14, 2016.

== Personal life ==
Vachon married Nicole Blanchard on November 30, 1971, and they had three children; Nicholas (who also played professional hockey), Jade and Marie-Joie, as well as three grandchildren; Calvin Vachon, Rogie's grandson, was drafted by the Kamloops Blazers in the 2020 US Prospect Draft. Nicole died from brain cancer in February 2016, after 44 years of marriage.

== Achievements ==
Award	Year(s)
Junior
QJHL First All-Star team	1966
NHL
Stanley Cup champion	1968, 1969, 1971
Vezina Trophy (Note: At the time, the award was given out from the 1946–47 to 1981–82 seasons for the "goaltender(s) of the team allowing the fewest goals during the regular season".); Shared with Gump Worsley	1968
All-Star Game	1973, 1975, 1978
NHL second All-Star team	1975, 1977
International
Canada Cup All-Star team, Team MVP	1976

- Vachon's #30 sweater was retired by the Los Angeles Kings on February 14, 1985
- Named to the Hockey Hall of Fame in the Players category in 2016

== Los Angeles Kings records ==
- Most career ties (66) (shared with Kelly Hrudey).

== Career statistics ==
=== Regular season and playoffs ===
Bold indicates led league

			Regular season									Playoffs
Season	Team	League	GP	W	L	T	MIN	GA	SO	GAA	SV%	GP	W	L	MIN	GA	SO	GAA	SV%
1963–64	Montreal NDG Monarchs	MMJHL	29	—	—	—	1740	71	4	2.45	—	18	12	6	1080	57	1	3.17	—
1963–64	Montreal Junior Canadiens	OHA	7	—	—	—	400	29	0	4.35	—	—	—	—	—	—	—	—	—
1963–64	Montreal NDG Monarchs	M-Cup	—	—	—	—	—	—	—	—	—	10	7	3	600	34	4	3.40	—
1964–65	Thetford Mines Aces	QJHL	13	10	3	0	780	35	0	2.69	—	5	1	4	300	30	0	6.00	—
1964–65	Montreal Junior Canadiens	OHA	14	—	—	—	840	58	0	4.14	—	—	—	—	—	—	—	—	—
1965–66	Thetford Mines Aces	QJHL	39	25	13	1	2340	117	2	3.00	—	11	7	4	659	31	1	2.82	—
1965–66	Quebec Aces	AHL	10	6	4	0	601	30	0	3.00	—	—	—	—	—	—	—	—	—
1966–67	Houston Apollos	CPHL	34	17	12	5	2020	99	2	2.91	—	—	—	—	—	—	—	—	—
1966–67	Montreal Canadiens	NHL	19	11	3	4	1137	47	1	2.48	.915	9	**6**	3	555	22	0	2.38	.926
1967–68	Montreal Canadiens	NHL	39	23	13	2	2227	92	4	2.48	.913	2	1	1	113	4	0	2.12	.933
1968–69	Montreal Canadiens	NHL	36	22	9	3	2051	98	2	2.87	.902	8	7	1	507	12	1	**1.42**	**.953**
1969–70	Montreal Canadiens	NHL	64	31	18	12	3697	162	4	2.63	.917	—	—	—	—	—	—	—	—
1970–71	Montreal Canadiens	NHL	47	23	12	9	2676	118	2	2.64	.914	—	—	—	—	—	—	—	—
1971–72	Montreal Canadiens	NHL	1	0	1	0	20	4	0	12.00	.765	—	—	—	—	—	—	—	—
1971–72	Los Angeles Kings	NHL	28	6	18	3	1586	107	0	4.05	.884	—	—	—	—	—	—	—	—
1972–73	Los Angeles Kings	NHL	52	22	20	10	3120	148	4	2.85	.899	—	—	—	—	—	—	—	—
1973–74	Los Angeles Kings	NHL	65	28	26	10	3751	175	5	2.80	.904	4	0	4	240	7	0	1.75	.927
1974–75	Los Angeles Kings	NHL	54	27	14	13	3239	121	6	2.24	**.926**	3	1	2	199	7	0	2.11	**.929**
1975–76	Los Angeles Kings	NHL	51	26	20	5	3060	160	5	3.14	.891	7	4	3	438	17	1	2.33	.912
1976–77	Los Angeles Kings	NHL	68	33	23	**12**	4059	184	8	2.72	.903	9	4	**5**	520	36	0	4.15	.868
1977–78	Los Angeles Kings	NHL	70	29	27	13	4107	196	4	2.86	.891	2	0	2	120	11	0	5.50	.784
1978–79	Detroit Red Wings	NHL	50	10	27	11	2908	189	0	3.90	.863	—	—	—	—	—	—	—	—
1979–80	Detroit Red Wings	NHL	59	20	**30**	8	3474	**209**	4	3.61	.873	—	—	—	—	—	—	—	—
1980–81	Boston Bruins	NHL	53	25	19	6	3021	168	1	3.34	.863	3	0	2	164	16	0	5.85	.846
1981–82	Boston Bruins	NHL	38	19	11	6	2165	132	1	3.66	.859	1	0	0	20	1	0	3.00	.667
NHL totals			795	355	291	127	46,298	2,310	51	2.99	.896	48	23	23	2,876	133	2	2.77	.907

=== International ===
Year	Team	Event	GP	W	L	T	MIN	GA	SO	GAA	SV%
1976	Canada	CC	7	6	1	0	432	10	2	1.39	.940
Senior totals			7	6	1	0	432	19	2	1.39	.940

"Rogie Vachon's stats". The Goaltender Home Page.

== Coaching record ==
Team	Year	Regular season						Post season
Team	Year	G	W	L	T	Pts	Finish	Result
Los Angeles Kings	1983–84	2	1	0	1	3	5th in Smythe	Interim; returned to GM's role
Los Angeles Kings	1987–88	1	0	1	0	0	4th in Smythe	Interim; returned to GM's role
Los Angeles Kings	1994–95	7	3	2	2	8	4th in Pacific	Missed playoffs
NHL totals		10	4	3	3			

== See also ==
- List of NHL goaltenders with 300 wins

== Notes ==
Preceded by Denis DeJordy and Glenn Hall	Winner of the Vezina Trophy with Gump Worsley; 1968	Succeeded by Glenn Hall and Jacques Plante
Preceded by George Maguire	General manager of the Los Angeles Kings; 1984-92	Succeeded by Nick Beverley
Preceded by Don Perry	Head coach of the Los Angeles Kings; 1984	Succeeded by Roger Neilson
Preceded by Pat Quinn	Head coach of the Los Angeles Kings; 1987	Succeeded by Robbie Ftorek
Preceded by Barry Melrose	Head coach of the Los Angeles Kings; 1995	Succeeded by Larry Robinson
