= Sam McMaster =

Canadian ice hockey manager

- Born: April 15, 1936 (age 90); Vancouver, British Columbia, Canada
- Occupation: Former general manager of the Los Angeles Kings

Sam McMaster (born May 3, 1944) is a former NHL General Manager of the Los Angeles Kings (NHL), whom he managed from 1994 to 1997.

McMaster served as the general manager for both the Sault Ste. Marie Greyhounds and the Sudbury Wolves of the Ontario Hockey League, prior to working with the Kings. McMaster's tenure with the Kings is best remembered for trading Wayne Gretzky to the St. Louis Blues in 1996.

== Early career ==
McMaster began his hockey career as the general manager for the Sault Ste. Marie Greyhounds of the Ontario Hockey League in 1984. After one season, McMaster left the team to become the director of hockey operations for the Washington Capitals, a position he held for three seasons.

McMaster returned to the OHL in 1988, when he was appointed the general manager for the Sudbury Wolves. McMaster assembled a Wolves team that was a perennial playoff contender, but often failed to make a substantial run.

== Los Angeles Kings ==
McMaster was hired by the Los Angeles Kings in May 1994, replacing Nick Beverley as the team's general manager, inheriting a team which was one year removed from its first Stanley Cup Final appearance. McMaster watched the team go into a free fall during the strike-shortened 1994-95 season, which prompted him to fire popular head coach Barry Melrose and assistant coach Cap Raeder with seven games left in the season as the team bottomed out to finish with a 16-23-9 record.

The following season, McMaster hired former Kings defenseman Larry Robinson as head coach. Despite the optimism, the Kings regressed to the bottom of the league's standings. The team was placed in bankruptcy protection during the off-season following the arrest of the team owner Bruce McNall, which forced McMaster to shed salary by trading away the team's veteran players, while faced with having to deal with a disgruntled Wayne Gretzky, who was unhappy with the direction of the team.

Faced with growing frustration from Wayne Gretzky, on 27 February 1996, McMaster traded Gretzky to the St. Louis Blues for three prospects, Craig Johnson, Patrice Tardif and Roman Vopat, along with a 5th round pick in 1996 (Peter Hogan) and a 1st round pick in 1997 (Matt Zultek). The trade wound up being disastrous for both teams. Gretzky played only 31 games for the Blues, while the players McMaster acquired did not amount to anything substantial for the Kings. While Johnson was able to earn a full-time roster spot with the team, both Tardif and Vopat left the league within three years, while Hogan and Zultek failed to make it to the NHL altogether.

Following the Gretzky trade, McMaster traded away the remaining core players from the 1993 Stanley Cup finalist team, save for Rob Blake in an attempt to rebuild the roster. As a result of his efforts, McMaster earned a two-year extension from the Kings on 20 May 1996.

Despite not being able to maximize his returns on trades, McMaster was able to acquire future Kings mainstays Mattias Norstrom and Ian Laperrière. Another noteworthy trade McMaster made was acquiring Stephane Fiset from the Colorado Avalanche in exchange for Eric Lacroix, who was the son of Avalanche general manager Pierre Lacroix.

Due to his performance at the draft table and questionable player acquisitions, McMaster earned the nickname "McMaster the Disaster" from fans and media alike.

McMaster was fired in 1997 after posting a 68-106-38 record over three seasons and was later replaced by former Kings player Dave Taylor.

== After Los Angeles ==
McMaster was hired as a pro scout for the Columbus Blue Jackets in 1999.

Preceded by Nick Beverley	General Manager of the Los Angeles Kings; 1994-97	Succeeded by Dave Taylor
