= Bill Hogaboam =

Canadian ice hockey player

- Born: May 9, 1949 (age 77) Swift Current, Saskatchewan, Canada
- Height: 5 ft 11 in (180 cm)
- Weight: 170 lb (77 kg; 12 st 2 lb)
- Position: Centre
- Shot: Right
- Played for: Atlanta Flames; Detroit Red Wings; Minnesota North Stars
- Playing career: 1970–1983

William Harold "Hogi" Hogaboam (/ˈhoʊɡəbɒm/ HOH-gə-bom; born May 9, 1949) is a Canadian former professional ice hockey centre. His professional career began in 1970–71 as a member of the Central Hockey League's Omaha Knights, as he played in 63 games, scoring 12 goals, 30 points, and 18 assists. The following year in Omaha he greatly improved his offensive output, scoring 30 goals, 82 points, and 52 assists.

In 1972–73, Hogaboam played two games in the National Hockey League (NHL) with the expansion Atlanta Flames, before being traded to the Detroit Red Wings for veteran Leon Rochefort at the end of November. He played four games for Detroit that season, but spent the majority of the season with the Virginia Wings of the American Hockey League (AHL). In 1973–74 he appeared in 47 games for the Red Wings, scoring 18 goals and 23 assists for 41 points, and 60 games the following year, with little increase of production.

Late in the 1975–76 season, Hogaboam was traded to the Minnesota North Stars for Dennis Hextall. Hogaboam was named the team's captain the next year and scored 25 points. After another two years in the North Stars' organization, Hogaboam was sent back to the Red Wings, where most of his playing time was spent in the minors. In 1982–83, Hogaboam played his final pro season with the Adirondack Red Wings of the AHL.

Hogaboam was born in Swift Current, Saskatchewan. He now lives in Kelowna, British Columbia and works at the Kelowna Golf and Country Club.

== Career statistics ==
			Regular season					Playoffs
Season	Team	League	GP	G	A	Pts	PIM	GP	G	A	Pts	PIM
1966–67	Swift Current Broncos	Exhib.	26	30	30	60	—	—	—	—	—	—
1967–68	Swift Current Broncos	WCJHL	40	27	26	53	34	—	—	—	—	—
1968–69	Swift Current Broncos	WCJHL	5	5	4	9	2	—	—	—	—	—
1969–70	Saskatoon Blades	WCJHL	53	27	42	69	8	7	3	2	5	2
1970–71	Omaha Knights	CHL	63	12	18	30	12	11	2	3	5	6
1971–72	Phoenix Roadrunners	WHL	1	0	1	1	2	—	—	—	—	—
1971–72	Omaha Knights	CHL	70	30	52	82	36	4	1	5	6	0
1972–73	Atlanta Flames	NHL	2	0	0	0	0	—	—	—	—	—
1972–73	Detroit Red Wings	NHL	4	1	0	1	2	—	—	—	—	—
1972–73	Virginia Wings	AHL	50	16	28	44	14	13	6	10	16	10
1973–74	Detroit Red Wings	NHL	47	18	23	41	12	—	—	—	—	—
1973–74	Virginia Wings	AHL	23	8	11	19	15	—	—	—	—	—
1974–75	Detroit Red Wings	NHL	60	14	27	41	16	—	—	—	—	—
1975–76	Detroit Red Wings	NHL	50	21	16	37	30	—	—	—	—	—
1975–76	Minnesota North Stars	NHL	18	7	7	14	6	—	—	—	—	—
1976–77	Minnesota North Stars	NHL	73	10	15	25	16	2	0	0	0	0
1977–78	Minnesota North Stars	NHL	8	1	2	3	4	—	—	—	—	—
1977–78	Fort Worth Texans	CHL	60	22	44	66	43	10	0	7	7	6
1978–79	Minnesota North Stars	NHL	10	1	1	2	0	—	—	—	—	—
1978–79	Oklahoma City Stars	CHL	40	21	29	50	18	—	—	—	—	—
1978–79	Detroit Red Wings	NHL	18	4	6	10	4	—	—	—	—	—
1979–80	Detroit Red Wings	NHL	42	3	12	15	10	—	—	—	—	—
1979–80	Adirondack Red Wings	AHL	25	11	15	26	4	—	—	—	—	—
1980–81	Adirondack Red Wings	AHL	73	19	37	56	78	18	0	15	15	4
1981–82	Dallas Black Hawks	CHL	67	20	47	67	24	16	1	9	10	8
1982–83	Adirondack Red Wings	AHL	77	20	38	58	14	6	3	5	8	0
CHL totals			300	105	190	295	133	41	4	24	28	20
NHL totals			332	80	109	189	100	2	0	0	0	0
AHL totals			248	74	129	203	125	37	9	30	39	14

Preceded by Bill Goldsworthy	Minnesota North Stars captain 1976–77	Succeeded by Nick Beverley
