= Nick Beverley =

Canadian ice hockey player and coach

- Born: April 21, 1947 (age 79) Toronto, Ontario, Canada
- Height: 6 ft 2 in (188 cm)
- Weight: 185 lb (84 kg; 13 st 3 lb)
- Position: Defence
- Shot: Right
- Played for: Boston Bruins; Pittsburgh Penguins; New York Rangers; Minnesota North Stars; Los Angeles Kings; Colorado Rockies
- Coached for: Toronto Maple Leafs
- Playing career: 1966–1980

Nicholas Gerald Beverley (born April 21, 1947) is a Canadian former professional ice hockey player and coach. Beverley played over 500 games in the National Hockey League (NHL) and later coached in both the NHL and American Hockey League (AHL).

== Career ==
Beverley played for the Boston Bruins, Pittsburgh Penguins, New York Rangers, Minnesota North Stars, and Colorado Rockies, totalling 18 goals, 94 assists for 112 total points in 501 games played. He scored his first NHL goal as a member of the Boston Bruins in his team's 6-0 victory over the Buffalo Sabres on January 14, 1973 at Boston Garden. It was the only goal Beverley scored as a Bruin. He was traded from the Bruins to the Pittsburgh Penguins for Darryl Edestrand. He was then acquired by the New York Rangers from the Penguins for Vic Hadfield on May 28, 1974.

Following his playing career, he became assistant coach of the Los Angeles Kings in 1981. He later became head coach of the New Haven Nighthawks of the AHL. Beverley spent a total of 14 years with the Kings holding a variety of positions including scout, assistant coach, head coach of minor affiliate, director of player personnel, assistant general manager and general manager. While in the position of general manager he led the Kings to their first Stanley Cup finals. After leaving the Kings, Beverley worked for the Toronto Maple Leafs as director of pro scouting, director of player personnel and as interim head coach when Pat Burns was released. As interim head coach, the Maple Leafs went 9–6–2 to finish the season. They made the playoffs, but lost in six games to the St. Louis Blues.

Following his time with the Leafs, Beverley joined his friend Mike Smith as assistant general manager of the Chicago Black Hawks. Following a big shakeup of the Blackhawks management, Beverley found himself unemployed with few prospects for jobs due to the looming work stoppage in 2004-05. In July 2005 he was signed as a scout for the Nashville Predators.

== Career statistics ==
			Regular Season					Playoffs
Season	Team	League	GP	G	A	Pts	PIM	GP	G	A	Pts	PIM
1963–64	Oshawa Generals	OHA-Jr.	3	0	1	1	0	6	0	0	0	0
1964–65	Oshawa Generals	OHA-Jr.	56	0	10	10	42	6	0	1	1	19
1965–66	Oshawa Generals	OHA-Jr.	47	0	10	10	41	17	1	4	5	18
1965–66	Oshawa Generals	M-Cup	—	—	—	—	—	14	2	5	7	6
1966–67	Boston Bruins	NHL	2	0	0	0	0	—	—	—	—	—
1966–67	Oshawa Generals	OHA-Jr.	48	8	14	22	57	—	—	—	—	—
1967–68	Oklahoma City Blazers	CPHL	70	8	20	28	60	4	0	0	0	17
1968–69	Oklahoma City Blazers	CHL	62	3	22	25	32	12	0	4	4	4
1969–70	Boston Bruins	NHL	2	0	0	0	2	—	—	—	—	—
1969–70	Oklahoma City Blazers	CHL	58	6	24	30	26	—	—	—	—	—
1970–71	Hershey Bears	AHL	70	3	23	26	46	4	0	0	0	2
1971–72	Boston Bruins	NHL	1	0	0	0	0	—	—	—	—	—
1971–72	Boston Braves	AHL	73	9	31	40	36	9	0	5	5	2
1972–73	Boston Bruins	NHL	75	1	10	11	26	4	0	0	0	0
1973–74	Boston Bruins	NHL	1	0	0	0	0	—	—	—	—	—
1973–74	Pittsburgh Penguins	NHL	67	2	14	16	21	—	—	—	—	—
1974–75	New York Rangers	NHL	67	3	15	18	19	3	0	1	1	0
1975–76	New York Rangers	NHL	63	1	8	9	46	—	—	—	—	—
1976–77	New York Rangers	NHL	9	0	0	0	2	—	—	—	—	—
1976–77	Minnesota North Stars	NHL	52	2	17	19	6	—	—	—	—	—
1977–78	Minnesota North Stars	NHL	57	7	14	21	18	—	—	—	—	—
1978–79	Los Angeles Kings	NHL	7	0	3	3	0	—	—	—	—	—
1978–79	Colorado Rockies	NHL	52	2	4	6	6	—	—	—	—	—
1979–80	Fort Worth Texans	CHL	12	0	6	6	4	—	—	—	—	—
1979–80	Colorado Rockies	NHL	46	0	9	9	10	—	—	—	—	—
1983–84	New Haven Nighthawks	AHL	2	0	1	1	0	—	—	—	—	—
NHL totals			501	18	94	112	156	7	0	1	1	0

== NHL coaching record ==
Team	Year	Regular season					Postseason		
Team	Year	Won	Lost	Tied	Win %	Finish	Won	Lost	Result
TOR	1995-96	9	6	2	.600	3rd in Central Division	2	4	Lost In First Round
Total		9	6	2	.600	0 Division; Championships	2	4	0 Stanley Cups

Preceded by Bill Hogaboam	Minnesota North Stars captain 1977–78	Succeeded by J. P. Parise
Preceded by Pat Burns	Head Coach of the Toronto Maple Leafs; 1995–96	Succeeded by Mike Murphy
Preceded by Rogatien Vachon	General Manager of the Los Angeles Kings; 1992-94	Succeeded by Sam McMaster
