= Los Angeles Kings =

National Hockey League team in Los Angeles, California

- 2026–27 Los Angeles Kings season
- Conference: Western
- Division: Pacific
- Founded: 1967
- History: Los Angeles Kings; 1967–present
- Home arena: Crypto.com Arena
- City: Los Angeles, California
- Team colors: Black, silver, white
- Media: Angels Broadcast Television; DAZN; ESPN Radio 710; La Primera 1330
- Owner: Anschutz Entertainment Group
- General manager: Ken Holland
- Head coach: Peter Laviolette
- Captain: Drew Doughty
- Minor league affiliates: Ontario Reign (AHL); Greenville Swamp Rabbits (ECHL)
- Stanley Cups: 2 (2011–12, 2013–14)
- Conference championships: 3 (1992–93, 2011–12, 2013–14)
- Presidents' Trophies: 0
- Division championships: 1 (1990–91)
- Official website: nhl.com/kings

The Los Angeles Kings are a professional ice hockey team based in Los Angeles. The Kings compete in the National Hockey League (NHL) as a member of the Pacific Division in the Western Conference. The team was founded on June 5, 1967, after Jack Kent Cooke was awarded an NHL expansion franchise for Los Angeles on February 9, 1966, becoming one of the six teams that began play as part of the 1967 NHL expansion. The team plays its home games at Crypto.com Arena in downtown Los Angeles (which they share with the Los Angeles Lakers of the NBA), their home since the start of the 1999–2000 season. Prior to that, the Kings played for 32 years at the Forum in Inglewood, California, a suburb of the Greater Los Angeles area.

During the 1970s and early 1980s, the Kings had many years marked by impressive play in the regular season only to be washed out by early playoff exits. Their highlights in those years included the strong goaltending of Rogie Vachon, and the "Triple Crown Line" of Charlie Simmer, Dave Taylor and Hall of Famer Marcel Dionne, who had a famous upset of the rising Edmonton Oilers in a 1982 playoff game known as the Miracle on Manchester. In 1988, the Kings traded with the Oilers to get their captain Wayne Gretzky, leading to a successful phase of the franchise that raised hockey's popularity in Los Angeles, and helped elevate the sport's profile in the American Sun Belt region. Gretzky, fellow Hall of Famer Luc Robitaille, and defenseman Rob Blake led the Kings to the franchise's sole division title in 1990–91, and the Kings' first Stanley Cup Final appearance in 1993, where they lost to the Montreal Canadiens.

After the 1993 Stanley Cup Final, the Kings entered financial problems, with a bankruptcy in 1995, which led to the franchise being acquired by Philip Anschutz (the owner of Anschutz Entertainment Group and the operators of Crypto.com Arena) and Ed Roski Jr.. A period of mediocrity ensued, with the Kings only resurging as they broke a six-year playoff drought in the 2009–10 season, with a team that included goaltender Jonathan Quick, defenseman Drew Doughty, and forwards Dustin Brown, Anže Kopitar, and Justin Williams. Under coach Darryl Sutter, who was hired early in the 2011–12 season, and with the acquisition of Jeff Carter, the Kings won two Stanley Cups in three years: 2012 over the New Jersey Devils, and 2014 over the New York Rangers, while Quick and Williams respectively won the Conn Smythe Trophy. The team has had mixed success since then as they have qualified for the playoffs from 2022 to 2026, but have not advanced past the first round – a feat they have not achieved since winning the Stanley Cup in 2014.

== History ==
=== NHL expansion and the "Forum Blue and Gold" years (1967–1975) ===
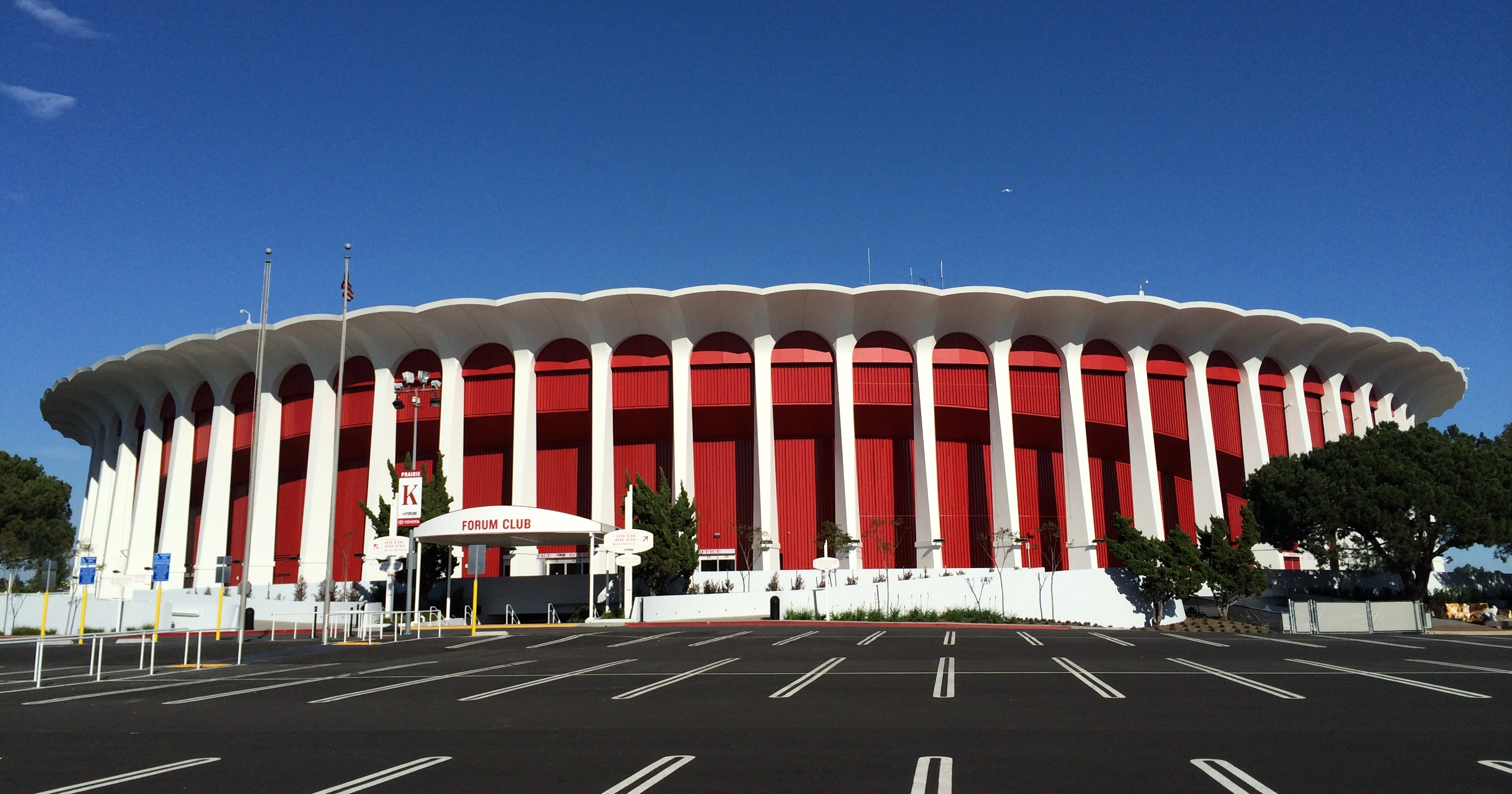
The Forum was the second home of the Kings from 1967 to 1999.

When the NHL decided to expand for the 1967–68 season amid rumblings that the Western Hockey League (WHL) was proposing to turn itself into a major league and compete for the Stanley Cup, Canadian entrepreneur Jack Kent Cooke paid the NHL $2 million to place one of the six expansion teams in Los Angeles. Following a fan contest to name the team, Cooke chose the name Kings because he wanted his club to take on "an air of royalty", and picked the original team colors of purple (or "Forum Blue", as it was later officially called) and gold because they were colors traditionally associated with royalty. This color scheme, first popularized by the NCAA's LSU Tigers and later on the Minnesota Vikings of the National Football League (NFL), was then adopted by the Los Angeles Lakers of the National Basketball Association (NBA), which Cooke also owned. Cooke wanted his new NHL team to play in the Los Angeles Memorial Sports Arena, home of the Lakers, but the Los Angeles Coliseum Commission, which managed the Sports Arena (and still manages the Los Angeles Memorial Coliseum today), had already entered into an agreement with the WHL's Los Angeles Blades (whose owners had also tried to land the NHL expansion franchise in Los Angeles) to play their games at the Sports Arena. Frustrated by his dealings with the Coliseum Commission, Cooke said, "I am going to build my own arena. ... I've had enough of this balderdash."

Construction on Cooke's new arena, the Forum, was not yet complete when the 1967–68 season began, so the Kings opened their first season at the Long Beach Arena in the neighboring city of Long Beach on October 14, 1967, defeating another expansion team, the Philadelphia Flyers, 4–2. The "Fabulous Forum" finally opened its doors on December 30, 1967, with the Kings being shut out by the Flyers, 2–0. While the first two seasons had the Kings qualifying for the playoffs, afterwards poor management led the Kings into hard times. The general managers established a history of trading away first-round draft picks, usually for veteran players, and attendance suffered during this time. Eventually the Kings made a few key acquisitions to resurge as a contender. By acquiring Toronto Maple Leafs winger Bob Pulford, who would later become the Kings' head coach, in 1970, Swedish center Juha Widing in a trade from the New York Rangers, and Montreal Canadiens goaltender Rogie Vachon in 1971, the Kings went from being one of the worst defensive teams in the league to one of the best, and in 1974 they returned to the playoffs.

=== Marcel Dionne and the "Triple Crown Line" (1975–1988) ===
After being eliminated in the first round of the playoffs in both 1973–74 and 1974–75, the Kings moved to significantly upgrade their offense when they acquired center Marcel Dionne from the Detroit Red Wings. Behind Dionne's offensive capabilities, the goaltending of Rogie Vachon, and the speed and scoring touch of forward Butch Goring, the Kings played two of their best seasons yet, with playoff match ups against the then-Atlanta Flames in the first round, and the Boston Bruins in the second round, both times being eliminated by Boston.

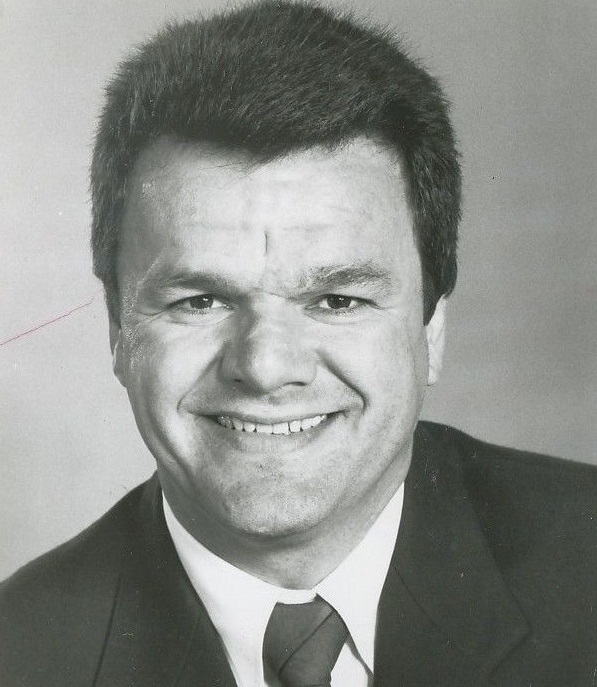
Acquired by the Kings in 1975, Marcel Dionne was paired with Dave Taylor and Charlie Simmer. The line, known as the Triple Crown Line, went on to be one of the highest-scoring line combinations in NHL history.

Bob Pulford left the Kings after the 1976–77 season after constant feuding with then owner Jack Kent Cooke, and General Manager Jake Milford decided to leave as well. This led to struggles in the 1977–78 season, where the Kings finished below .500 and were easily swept out of the first round by the Maple Leafs. Afterwards, Vachon became a free agent and sign with the Red Wings. The following season, Kings coach Bob Berry tried juggling line combinations, and Dionne found himself on a new line with two young, mostly unknown players: second-year right winger Dave Taylor and left winger Charlie Simmer, who had been a career minor-leaguer. Each player benefited from each other, with Simmer being the gritty player who battled along the boards, Taylor being the play maker, and Dionne being the natural goal scorer. This line combination, known as the "Triple Crown Line", would go on to become one of the highest-scoring line combinations in NHL history. During the first three seasons of the Triple Crown Line, a period where Dr. Jerry Buss purchased the Kings, the Lakers, and the Forum for $67.5 million, the Kings were eliminated in the first round. The Kings regressed in 1981–82 finishing 17th overall, but this was nevertheless good enough to make the 1982 Stanley Cup playoffs under the new format put in place that year as they were still fourth in their division with 63 points, the lowest point total of any playoff team but ahead of the Colorado Rockies, the worst team in the league that season. However, Los Angeles managed to upset the second overall Edmonton Oilers, who finished 48 points ahead of them during the season and were led by the young Wayne Gretzky. With two victories in Edmonton and one at the Forum – dubbed "Miracle on Manchester", where the Kings managed to erase a 5–0 deficit in the third period and eventually win in overtime – the Kings upset the vaunted Oilers, but they wound up eliminated by eventual finalists Vancouver Canucks in five games.

The 1982 off-season saw the moribund Rockies move to East Rutherford, New Jersey. To keep the divisions geographically and numerically balanced, the renamed New Jersey Devils were re-aligned to the Patrick Division while the Winnipeg Jets took their place in the Smythe Division. It was immediately apparent that the Kings, now the lone American team in the division, would have a much more difficult time staying out of last place since Winnipeg, after struggling for their first two seasons after moving over from the WHA, had already improved to a .500 record the previous season. Despite Dionne's leadership, the Kings missed the playoffs in the next two seasons.

The Kings managed to record a winning record in 1984–85 under coach Pat Quinn, although it was still only good enough for fourth place. This time, the Kings were quickly swept out of the playoffs by the Oilers on their way to capturing their second-straight Stanley Cup championship. After a losing season in 1985–86, the Kings saw two important departures during 1986–87, as Quinn signed a contract in December to become coach and general manager of the Vancouver Canucks with just months left on his Kings contract – eventually being suspended by NHL President John Ziegler for creating a conflict of interest - and Dionne left the franchise in March in a trade to the New York Rangers. Despite these shocks, a young squad that would lead the Kings into the next decade, including star forwards Bernie Nicholls, Jimmy Carson, Luc Robitaille, and defenseman Steve Duchesne, started to flourish under head coach Mike Murphy, who played 13 seasons with the Kings and was their captain for seven years, and his replacement Robbie Ftorek. The Kings made the playoffs for two seasons, but they were unable to get out of the first round given the playoff structuring forced them to play either the Oilers or the equally powerful Calgary Flames en route to the conference finals. In all, the Kings faced either the Oilers or the Flames in the playoffs four times during the 1980s.

=== The Gretzky era (1988–1995) ===
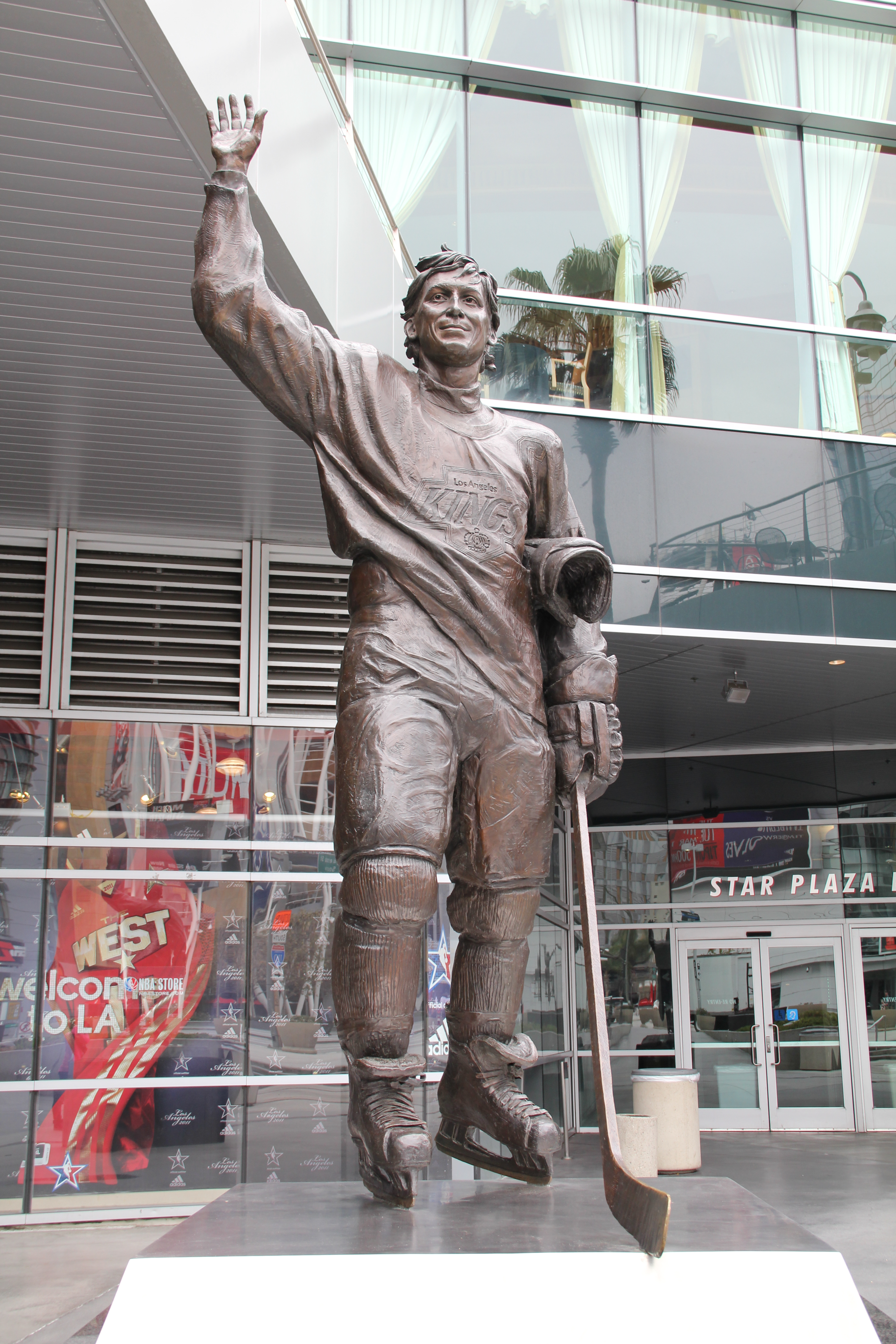
Statue of Wayne Gretzky outside Crypto.com Arena. Gretzky played with the Kings from 1988 to 1996.

In 1987, coin collector Bruce McNall purchased the Kings from Buss and turned the team into a Stanley Cup contender almost overnight. After changing the team colors to silver and black, McNall acquired the league's best player, Wayne Gretzky, in a blockbuster trade with the Edmonton Oilers on August 9, 1988. The trade rocked the hockey world, especially north of the border, where Canadians mourned the loss of a player they considered a national treasure. Gretzky's arrival generated much excitement about hockey and the NHL in Southern California, and the ensuing popularity of the Kings is credited for the arrival of another team in the region (the Mighty Ducks of Anaheim, renamed the Anaheim Ducks in 2006), as well as the arrival of a new team in Northern California (the San Jose Sharks) and the NHL's expanding or moving into other Sun Belt cities such as Dallas, Phoenix (until 2024), Tampa, Miami, Nashville, and Las Vegas.

In Gretzky's first season with the Kings, he led the team in scoring with 168 points on 54 goals and 114 assists and won his ninth Hart Memorial Trophy as the league's Most Valuable Player. The fourth overall Kings eliminated Gretzky's old team, the Oilers, in the first round of the 1989 playoffs before being swept out in the second round by the eventual Stanley Cup champion Flames. Clashes between Gretzky and head coach Robbie Ftorek led to Ftorek's dismissal, and he was replaced by Tom Webster. The next season, where Gretzky became the league's all-time leading scorer, was the inverse of its predecessor, with the Kings eliminating the defending champion Flames before falling to the eventual champion Oilers. Gretzky spearheaded the Kings to their first regular season division title in franchise history in the 1990–91 season, but the heavily favored Kings lost a close series against Edmonton in the second round that saw four games go into overtime. After a third straight elimination by the Oilers in 1992, Webster was fired. General manager Rogie Vachon was moved to a different position in the organization and named Nick Beverley as his successor, and Beverley hired Barry Melrose, then with the American Hockey League's Adirondack Red Wings, as head coach.

Melrose would help the Kings reach new heights in the 1992–93 season, even if Gretzky missed 39 games with a career-threatening herniated thoracic disk. Led by Luc Robitaille, who served as captain in Gretzky's absence, the Kings finished with a 39–35–10 record (88 points), clinching third place in the Smythe Division. Heavily contested series in the 1993 playoffs had the Kings eliminating the Flames, Canucks and Leafs en route to their first berth in the Stanley Cup Final. In the 1993 Stanley Cup Final, the Kings faced the Montreal Canadiens. They won the first game 4–1, but late in game 2, with the Kings leading by a score of 2–1, Canadiens coach Jacques Demers requested a measurement of Kings defenseman Marty McSorley's stick blade. His suspicions proved to be correct, as the curve of blade was too great, and McSorley was penalized. The Canadiens pulled their goaltender, Patrick Roy, giving them a two-man advantage, and Éric Desjardins scored on the resulting power play to tie the game. Montreal went on to win the game in overtime on another goal by Desjardins, and the Kings never recovered. They dropped the next two games in overtime, and lost game 5, 4–1, giving the Canadiens their league-leading 24th Stanley Cup in franchise history.

=== Bankruptcy, move to the Staples Center, and rebuild (1995–2009) ===
The years after the 1993 playoff run were tough for the Kings, as a sluggish start in the 1993–94 season cost them a playoff berth, their first absence from the postseason since 1986. However, Gretzky provided a notable highlight during that year on March 23, 1994, when he scored his 802nd career goal to pass Gordie Howe as the NHL's all-time leading goal-scorer. At the same time, McNall defaulted on a loan from Bank of America, who threatened to force the Kings into bankruptcy unless he sold the team. After the federal government launched an investigation into his financial practices, McNall finally sold the club to IDB Communications founder Jeffrey Sudikoff and former Madison Square Garden president Joseph Cohen. It later emerged that McNall's free-spending ways put the Kings in serious financial trouble; at one point, Cohen and Sudikoff were even unable to meet player payroll, and were ultimately forced into bankruptcy in 1995. They were forced to trade many of their stronger players, and the middling results led to Gretzky demanding a trade to a legitimate Stanley Cup contender. He would be dealt to the St. Louis Blues in 1996.

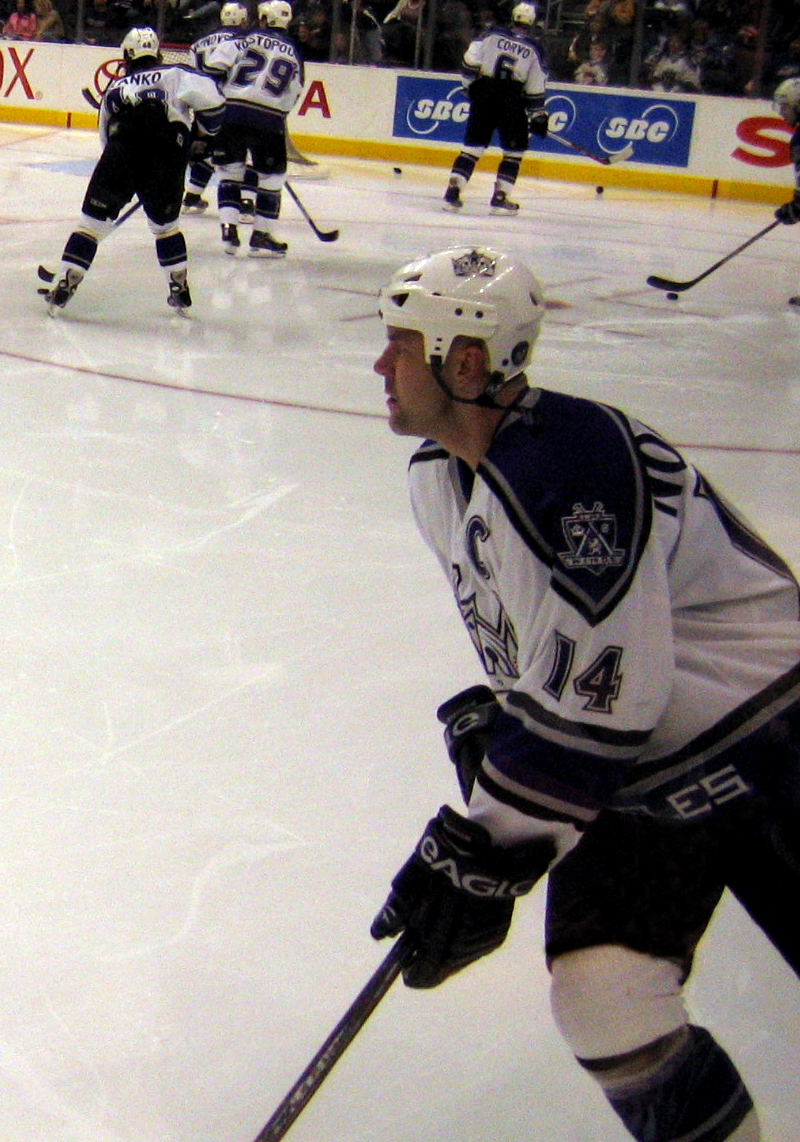
Acquired in a trade with the New York Rangers in 1995, Mattias Norström was named as the team captain in 2001 and maintained the position until he was traded in 2007.

On October 6, 1995, one day before the 1995–96 season opener, a bankruptcy court approved the purchase of the Kings by Philip Anschutz and Edward P. Roski for $113.5 million. The subsequent rebuild saw the Kings only return to the playoffs in 1998, led by captain Rob Blake and players like Jozef Stümpel and Glen Murray, where the highly skilled St. Louis Blues swept the team in four games. The Kings suffered through an injury-plagued season in 1998–99 as they finished last in the Pacific Division and missed the playoffs with a 32–45–5 record, leading to the dismissal of head coach Larry Robinson.

The Kings, along with the Los Angeles Lakers, made an even bigger move in 1999, as they left The Forum after 32 seasons and moved to the Staples Center in downtown Los Angeles, which was built by Anschutz and Roski. Staples Center was a state-of-the-art arena, complete with luxury suites and all modern amenities. With a new home, a new coach (Andy Murray), a potential 50-goal scorer in the fold in Žigmund Pálffy, and players such as Blake, Robitaille, Murray, Stümpel, Donald Audette, Ian Laperrière, and Mattias Norström, the Kings improved dramatically, finishing the season the 1999–2000 season with a 39–31–12–4 record (94 points), good for second place in the Pacific Division. While Audette would struggle under the Kings' system and was unhappy as the number two right wing, most of the new Kings like Bryan Smolinski and Pálffy would find success under Andy Murray. But in the 2000 playoffs, the Kings were once again dispatched in the first round, this time by the Detroit Red Wings in a four-game sweep.

The 2000–01 season was controversial, as fans began to question AEG's commitment to the success of the Kings because they failed to significantly improve the team during the off-season. Adding fuel to the fire was the February 21, 2001, trade of star defenseman and fan favorite Rob Blake to the Colorado Avalanche. Despite this, two players received in the deal, right wing Adam Deadmarsh and defenseman Aaron Miller, became impact players for the Kings, who finished the 2000–01 season with a 38–28–13–3 record (92 points), good for a third-place finish in the Pacific Division and another first-round playoff date with the Detroit Red Wings. The heavily favored Red Wings suffered an upset, losing in six games for the Kings' first playoff series win since 1993. In the second round, the Kings forced seven games in their series against the Avalanche, but lost to the eventual Stanley Cup champions.

Afterwards, during the off-season, Luc Robitaille turned down a one-year deal with a substantial pay cut and ended up signing with Detroit, as the Red Wings represented his best chance at winning the Stanley Cup, and like Tomas Sandström before him in 1997, Robitaille won the Stanley Cup with Detroit in 2002. The Kings started off the season with a sluggish October and November, and then found their game again to finish with 95 points. They in fact were tied in points with the second-place Phoenix Coyotes, and only finished third in the Pacific Division and seventh in the West due to a head-to-head record – the Coyotes won the season series, 3–0–2. In the playoffs they met the Colorado Avalanche once again, this time in the first round. The series would prove to be a carbon copy of their previous meeting, with the Kings behind three games to one and bouncing back to tie the series, only to be dominated in the seventh game and eliminated. The next seasons would be major disappointments as the Kings hit another major decline, missing the postseason up until the 2009–10 season.

During those mediocre seasons, there would be a few bright spots in the form of draft picks that would attribute to future success for the team, beginning with the 2003 NHL entry draft. Players such as Dustin Brown (2003), Anže Kopitar, Jonathan Quick (both 2005), and Drew Doughty (2008) were drafted and would help the Kings reach the playoffs once again.

=== Return to the playoffs (2009–2011) ===
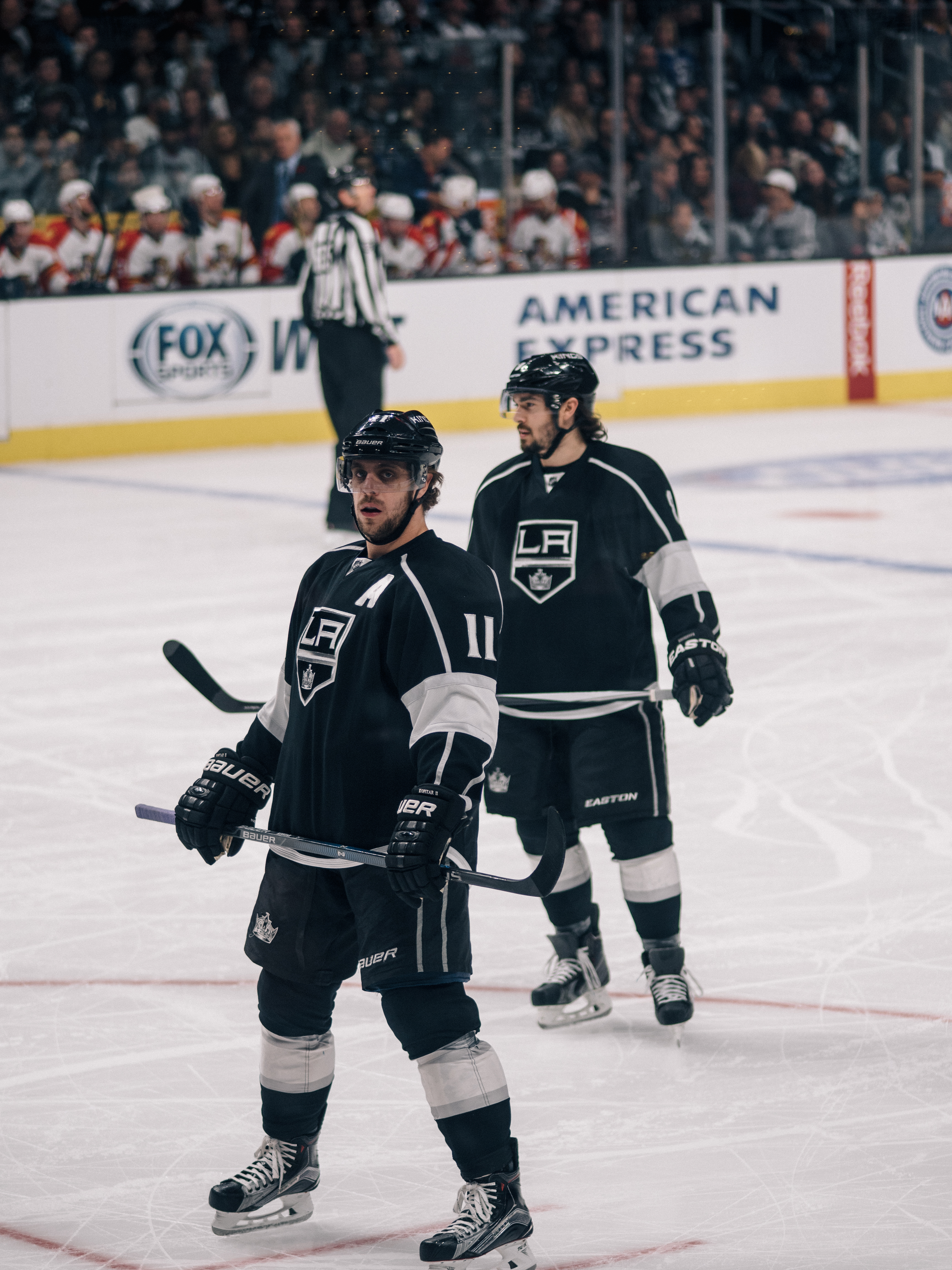
Drafted by the Kings in the late 2000s, Anže Kopitar (left) and Drew Doughty (right) helped the team become playoff contenders in the early 2010s.

During the 2009–10 season, the team had built a consistent roster with goaltender Jonathan Quick, defenseman Drew Doughty, and forwards Dustin Brown, Anže Kopitar and Justin Williams. Finishing sixth overall in the West with 101 points, just the third 100-plus point season in franchise history, and establishing a franchise record with a nine-game unbeaten streak, the Kings returned to the playoffs, where they lost to a highly skilled third-seeded Vancouver Canucks team in six games.

The Kings entered the 2011 playoffs as the seventh seed in the West and played the second-seeded San Jose Sharks in the first round. Despite Anže Kopitar's absence with injury, the Kings pushed the series to six games until an overtime goal by Joe Thornton qualified the Sharks.

=== Stanley Cup championships (2011–2014) ===
A bad start to the 2011–12 season resulted in coach Terry Murray being fired, with Darryl Sutter being chosen as his replacement. The Kings were much improved under Sutter, finishing with the eighth seed after trading for Jeff Carter midseason and having finishing the season with a 40–27–15 record for 95 points. The Kings then headed into the 2012 playoffs against the back-to-back Presidents' Trophy-winning Vancouver Canucks. After playing two games in Vancouver and one in Los Angeles, the Kings were up 3–0 in the series, a franchise first. By winning game 5 in Vancouver in overtime, the Kings advanced to the conference semifinals for the first time since the 2000–01 season, whereupon they swept the second-seeded St. Louis Blues, advancing to the conference finals for only the second time in franchise history. In doing so, the Kings also became the first NHL team to enter the playoffs as the eighth seed and eliminate the first- and second-seeded teams in the conference. They then defeated Phoenix in five games to reach the Stanley Cup Final, culminating in an overtime goal by Dustin Penner in game 5, and thus becoming the second team in NHL history to beat the top three Conference seeds in the playoffs (the Calgary Flames achieved the same feat in 2004, ironically also under Darryl Sutter) and the first eighth seed to accomplish the feat.

Los Angeles faced the New Jersey Devils in the Cup Final, defeating them in six games to win their first Stanley Cup in franchise history. With the game 6 victory occurring on home ice at Staples Center, the Kings became the first team since the 2007 Anaheim Ducks to win the Stanley Cup at home, as well as the second Californian NHL team to do so. The Kings became the first eight seed champion in any of the North American major leagues, the first Stanley Cup champion that finished below fifth in its conference, and the third to finish below second in its division (after the 1993 Canadiens and the 1995 Devils). Goaltender Jonathan Quick was awarded the Conn Smythe Trophy as the most valuable player during the playoffs, and soon after signed a ten-year contract extension on June 28.

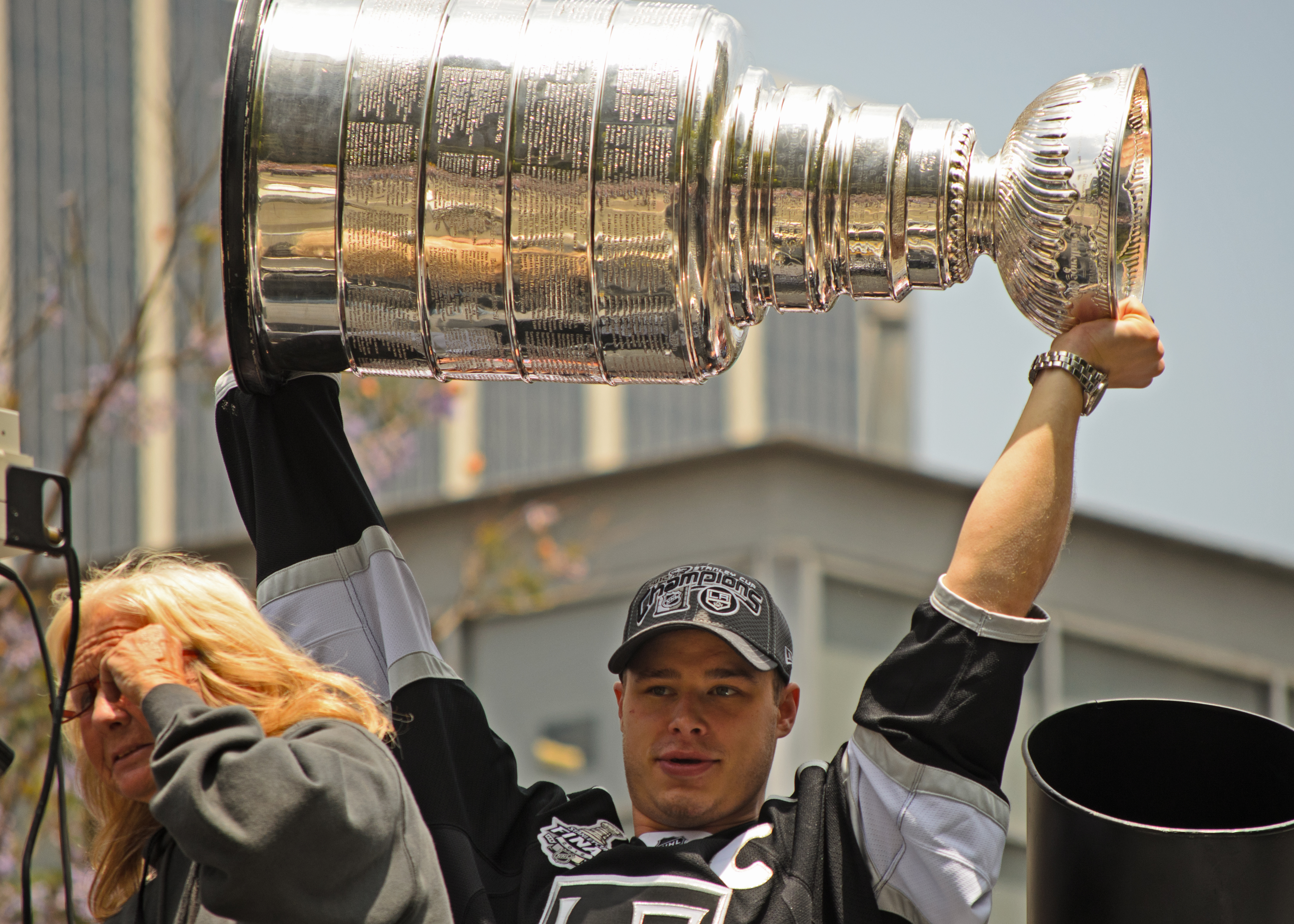
Dustin Brown with the Stanley Cup during the Kings' victory parade, after defeating the New Jersey Devils in the 2012 Stanley Cup Final

Due to the 2012–13 NHL lockout, the 2012–13 NHL season began on January 19, 2013, and was shortened to 48 games. The Kings finished the season as the fifth seed in the West and began the defense of the Cup on the road against the St. Louis Blues, who they swept in the 2012 playoffs. After losing the first two games, the Kings won four in a row to eliminate the Blues in six games. In the second round, they then played a very tough San Jose Sharks team, this time with home-ice advantage. In the first game, Jarret Stoll suffered an injury from the Sharks' Raffi Torres, who ended up being suspended for the rest of the series. The Kings eventually won in seven games. In the conference finals, they faced the number one seed in the West and Presidents' Trophy winning-Chicago Blackhawks. After dropping the first two games, the Kings won game 3 with Jeff Carter suffering an injury from Blackhawks defenseman Duncan Keith, who was suspended for game 4 as a result. After losing game 4, the Kings battled the Blackhawks through two overtime periods in game 5, with Patrick Kane eventually scoring the game-winning goal that won the game and the series, sending the Blackhawks to the 2013 Stanley Cup Final against the Boston Bruins (whom they defeated in six games for their second Stanley Cup in four seasons) and ending the Kings' season.

During the 2013–14 season, the Kings acquired Marián Gáborík, and qualified for their fifth straight playoffs with the sixth-best result of the West. In the first round of the 2014 playoffs, the Kings played their in-state rivals, the San Jose Sharks. After losing the first three games to the Sharks, the Kings became the fourth team in NHL history to win the final four games in a row after initially being down three games to none, beating the Sharks in San Jose in the deciding game 7. In the second round, the Kings played another in-state rival, Anaheim. After starting the series with two wins, the Kings lost three-straight games, trailing the series three games to two. However, for the second time in the first two rounds of the playoffs, the Kings were able to rally back after being down in the series and defeated the Ducks in Anaheim in game 7. In the third round, the Kings jumped out to a three-games-to-one lead against Stanley Cup-defending Chicago, but were unable to close out the series in the fifth and sixth games. On June 1, 2014, the Kings advanced to the Stanley Cup Final for the second time in three years after winning game 7, 4–3, in overtime through a goal from Alec Martinez, clinching their third Western Conference title in franchise history. The Kings became the first team in NHL history to win three game 7s en route to a Stanley Cup Final berth. Not only were the Kings the first team in history to accomplish this feat, but they also managed to win all game sevens on opposing ice. For the third time, the Kings were finalists after finishing third in their division and sixth or lower in their conference.

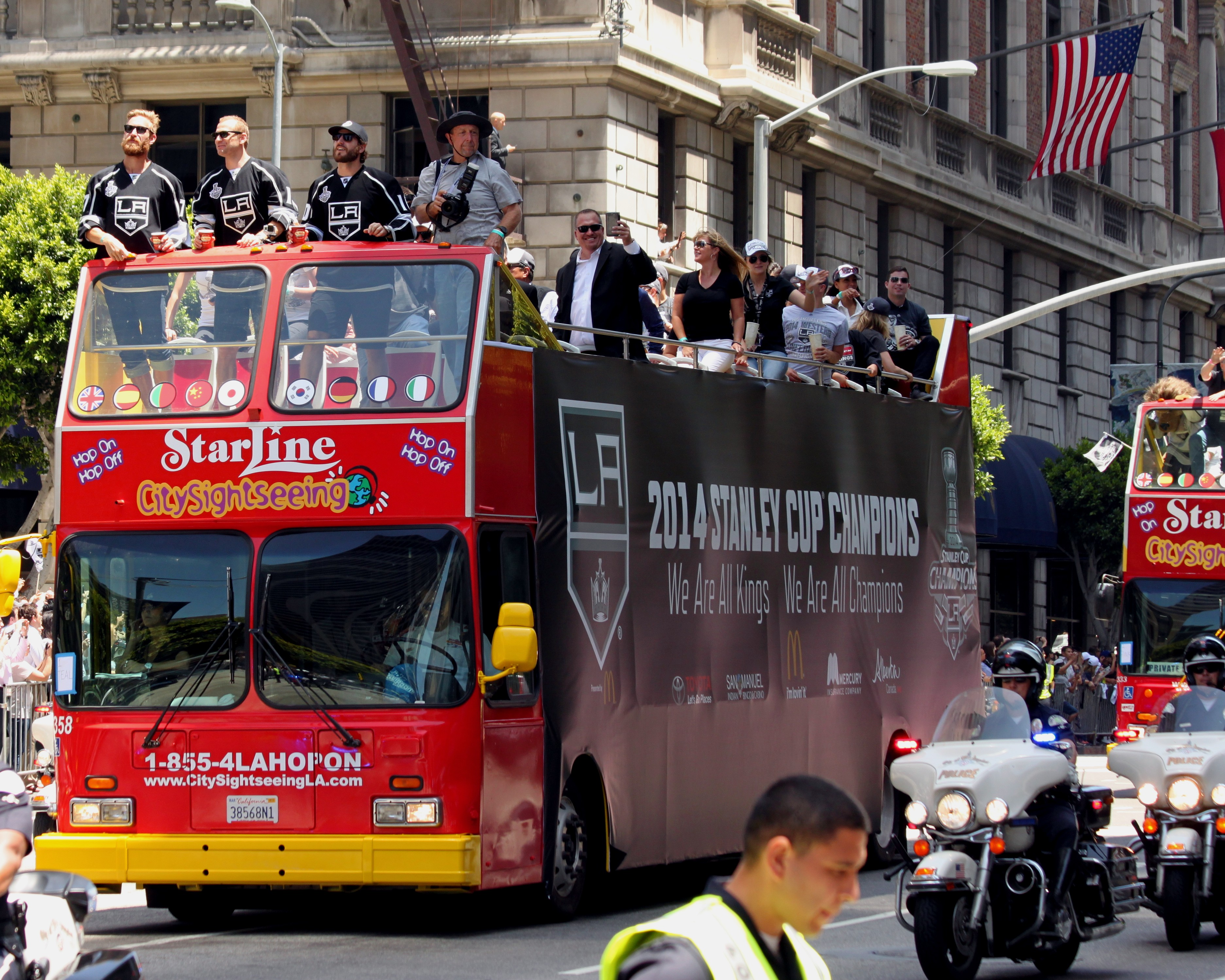
Parade held for the 2013–14 Kings team, shortly after they won their second Stanley Cup

In the Stanley Cup Final, the Kings faced the Eastern Conference-winning New York Rangers, who had defeated the Montreal Canadiens in six games in the conference finals. The Kings won the Stanley Cup in five games, culminating with an Alec Martinez goal in the second overtime of game 5 at Staples Center. The championship run had a record-tying 26 playoff games (the 1986–87 Philadelphia Flyers and 2003–04 Calgary Flames being the others), with the Kings facing elimination a record seven times. With their game 7 victory in the conference finals and wins in the first two games of the Cup Final, they became the first team to win three consecutive playoff games after trailing by more than one goal in each game. Justin Williams, who scored twice in the Cup Final and had points in all three game 7s throughout the playoffs, won the Conn Smythe Trophy as playoff MVP.

=== Post-Stanley Cup titles and continued contention (2014–2021) ===
Having won two Stanley Cup championships in the last three years, the Kings entered the 2014–15 season as the early favorites to retain their title. However, the Kings struggled often, with scoring slumps, defensemen losing games to injury and suspensions and frequent road losses. A defeat to the Calgary Flames in the penultimate game of the season eliminated the Kings from playoff contention, while qualifying Calgary, which coincidentally missed the postseason during the Kings' five-season playoff streak. Despite finishing with a record of 40–27–15, the Kings became the first defending Stanley Cup champion to miss the postseason since the 2006–07 Carolina Hurricanes and only the fourth overall since the 1967 NHL expansion season.

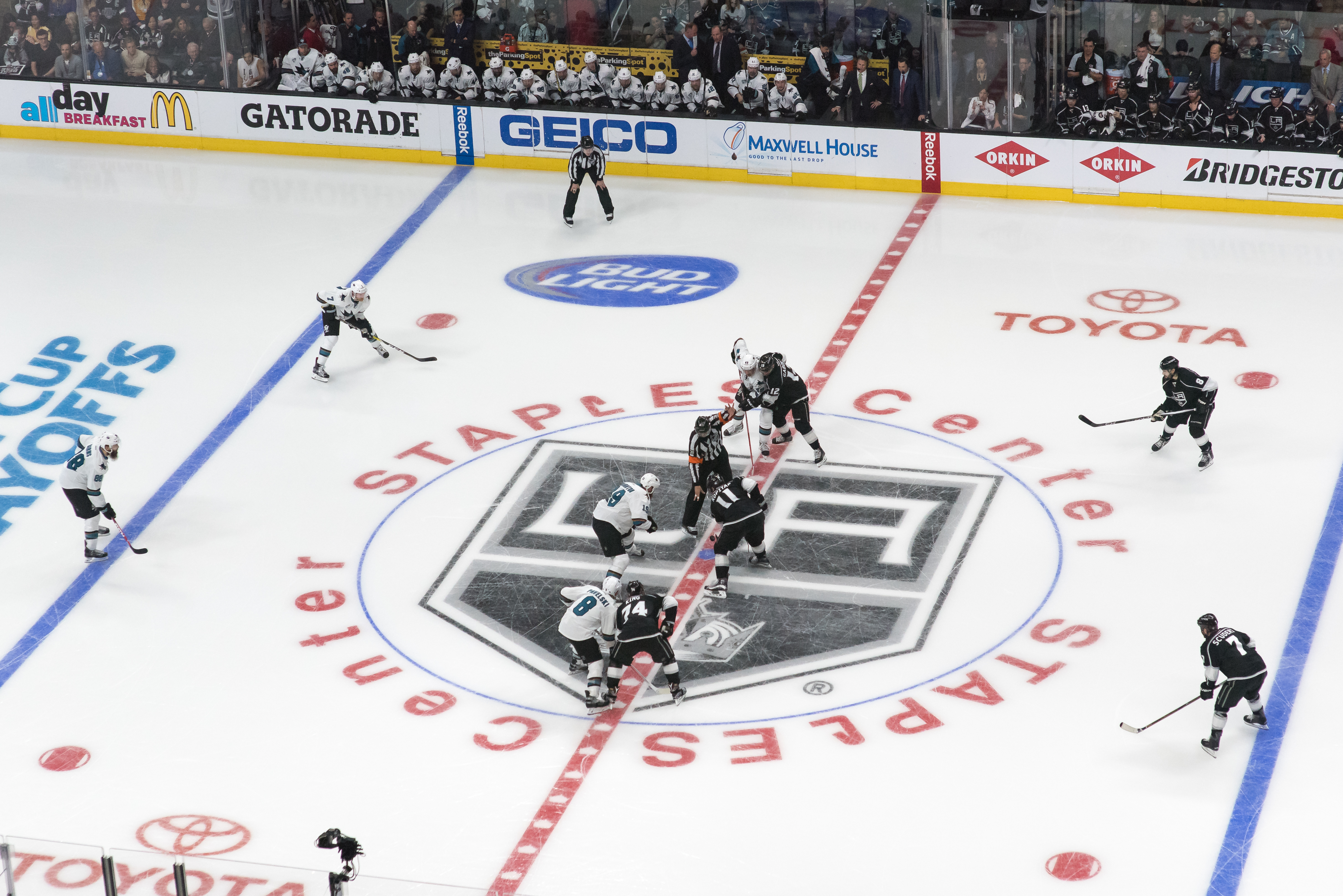
A face-off between the Kings and the San Jose Sharks, during game 5 of the first round in the 2016 Stanley Cup playoffs.

At the start of the 2015–16 season, the Kings were expected to make the playoffs. They entered the playoffs as the fifth seed in their conference and second seed in their division. They faced the San Jose Sharks, but lost to them in five games. On June 16, 2016, the Kings named Anže Kopitar the 14th captain in team history, replacing Dustin Brown, who had led the team for the past eight seasons.

The Kings celebrated their 50th anniversary during the 2016–17 season along with the other still active 1967 expansion teams (the St. Louis Blues, Philadelphia Flyers, and Pittsburgh Penguins), and for the first time since 2002, they hosted the NHL All-Star Game; Jeff Carter and Drew Doughty would represent the Kings at the All-Star Game, with the former leading the team in scoring this season. Goaltender Jonathan Quick suffered an injury on opening night that sidelined him for most of the season, and the Kings struggled without him. Backup Peter Budaj filled the void, earning his first starting duties since his time with the Colorado Avalanche six years earlier, but near the trade deadline, the Kings traded him to Tampa Bay for another goaltender, Ben Bishop who shared the crease with Jonathan Quick down the stretch, the superstar having returned from his injury. Despite the trade, the Kings ultimately missed the playoffs for the second time in three seasons and, in the off-season, fired general manager Dean Lombardi and head coach Darryl Sutter. Assistant general manager Rob Blake was promoted to be the new general manager and John Stevens took over as head coach after serving as associate head coach for the Kings for several seasons. In the 2017 NHL expansion draft, the Vegas Golden Knights drafted defenseman Brayden McNabb, who had been left unprotected by the Kings. In the next season, the Kings clinched the 2018 playoffs as a wild card, but were swept by the expansion Golden Knights.

On November 4, 2018, the Kings fired Stevens as head coach after the team started the 2018–19 season 4–8–1, and replaced him with Willie Desjardins. In Desjardins' debut on November 7, the Kings defeated the Ducks 4–1. The Kings finished the 2018–19 season in last place in both the Pacific Division and Western Conference with 71 points and they missed the playoffs for the third time in five seasons.

The Kings hired Todd McLellan as their next head coach on April 16, 2019. The 2019–20 season was highlighted by several rebuilding moves, as players such as Trevor Lewis, Jack Campbell, Kyle Clifford, Derek Forbort and Alec Martinez would all depart the team, through trades or via free agency. The team notably won the 2020 Stadium Series in a 3–1 win over the Colorado Avalanche, which saw Tyler Toffoli score the league's first hat trick in an outdoor regular season game; Toffoli was traded to the Vancouver Canucks two days after the feat. In their later portion of the season, the Kings called up several prospects including Mikey Anderson, Gabriel Vilardi and Cal Petersen, as the team went on a seven-game win streak, showcasing their deep and talented prospect pool. However, this win streak would mark the end of their season; the NHL would pause its season due to the COVID-19 pandemic, and as part of their plan to return to play, the regular season was officially ended, and the Kings were one of seven teams left out of the playoffs. They were automatically entered into the first phase of the 2020 NHL draft lottery, in which the Kings received the second overall pick.

In the 2020–21 season, the Kings had another rebuilding year as they traded Jeff Carter, extended Alex Iafallo and saw debuts of prospects such as Jaret Anderson-Dolan, Arthur Kaliyev, Tobias Björnfot, Rasmus Kupari and Quinton Byfield. A bright spot saw Anže Kopitar score his 1,000th point near season's end. They finished sixth in the West Division and missed the playoffs again. During the 2021 NHL expansion draft, the Seattle Kraken selected Kurtis MacDermid from the Kings, who was left unprotected.

=== Return to playoffs and first round struggles (2021–present) ===
In the lead-up to the 2021–22 season, the Kings acquired forwards Phillip Danault and Viktor Arvidsson during the off-season. They also signed defenseman Alexander Edler in an effort to bolster their blue line presence. The Kings qualified for the playoffs for the first time in four seasons, despite losing Drew Doughty to injury. This season would also prove to be Dustin Brown's last, as the forward announced on April 28, 2022, that he would retire following the 2022 playoffs. They were defeated by the Edmonton Oilers in seven games in the first round.

During the 2022 off-season, the Kings acquired Kevin Fiala from the Minnesota Wild to replace Brown on the first line. The 2022–23 season would start off well, as Fiala would lead the team in points for much of the season and be elected to the 2023 All-Star Game. Clinching the 2023 playoffs, the Kings once again faced the Edmonton Oilers in the first round, this time losing in six games.

The Kings made a blockbuster move in the 2023 off-season, trading forwards Gabriel Vilardi, Alex Iafallo and Rasmus Kupari to the Winnipeg Jets in exchange for forward Pierre-Luc Dubois, who signed an eight-year, $68 million contract upon being traded.

The 2023–24 season got off to a strong start, as the team began the season with an 11–0–0 record on the road, breaking the NHL record (previously held by the Buffalo Sabres) for the longest unbeaten road streak to start the year. Goaltender Cam Talbot's resurgent play led to him being named to the 2024 NHL All-Star weekend. However, in January 2024, the Kings' season collapsed; despite making no major lineup or personnel changes, the Kings suddenly won just three of their final 17 games before the All-Star break. On February 2, the Kings fired head coach McLellan, with assistant Jim Hiller named interim head coach. Under Hiller, the Kings regained their footing but never fully returned to their stronger form from earlier in the season. They finished third in the Pacific Division and clinched the 2024 playoffs, where they would be eliminated by the Edmonton Oilers for the third year in a row, this time in five games.

Hiller was subsequently promoted to full-time head coach following the season. Much discussion during and after the Kings' season centered around Pierre-Luc Dubois, as his season in Los Angeles was largely underwhelming. Dubois only managed 16 goals and 40 points, and finished with a plus-minus rating of –9, despite the heavy expectations that came with his new deal. His first season with the Kings would be his only one, as he would be traded to the Washington Capitals in exchange for goaltender Darcy Kuemper, who had previously spent time with the Kings.

The 2024–25 season started off well, and the Kings continued to be at a strong run of form after the 4 Nations Face-Off break which saw them finish second in the Pacific Division to clinch the 2025 playoffs. Goaltender Darcy Kuemper's resurgent play saw him named a Vezina Trophy finalist at the end of the season. In the playoffs they would meet their rival Oilers for the fourth consecutive year; this time, the Kings initially took a 2–0 series lead, but in Game 3, with the Kings holding a 4–3 lead in the third period, Evander Kane scored the tying goal, and Jim Hiller controversially challenged the goal for goaltender interference. The unsuccessful challenge resulted in the Oilers scoring the game winning goal on the power play. The challenge proved to be the turning point of the series, as the Kings would end up losing the next four games and being eliminated by Edmonton in the first round for the fourth time in a row.

Following the season, the Kings announced that vice-president and general manager Rob Blake's contract would not be renewed, the Kings subsequently hired former Oilers general manager Ken Holland as his replacement.

On September 18, 2025, captain Anže Kopitar, widely considered to be one of the greatest players to ever suit up for the Kings, announced that the 2025–26 season, his 20th in the NHL, would be his last.

On March 1, 2026, with the team sitting at 24–21–14 overall and 2–5–1 in their past eight games, head coach Hiller was fired by the Kings, with D. J. Smith named his interim replacement. On April 2, the Kings would break the record for the most overtime/shootout losses in NHL history with 19 after a 5–4 shootout loss to the Nashville Predators. The team narrowly qualified for the playoffs, but were swept by the Colorado Avalanche.

On June 9, Peter Laviolette was named head coach. On September 16, star defenseman Drew Doughty was named as team captain.

== Team identity ==
=== Uniforms and logos ===
Original logo, used 1967–1982

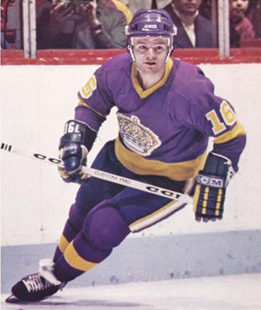
Marcel Dionne in the "forum blue" Kings uniform in 1979; from 1967 to 1988, the Kings wore purple pants, and except for 1970-1979, they wore it for both jerseys

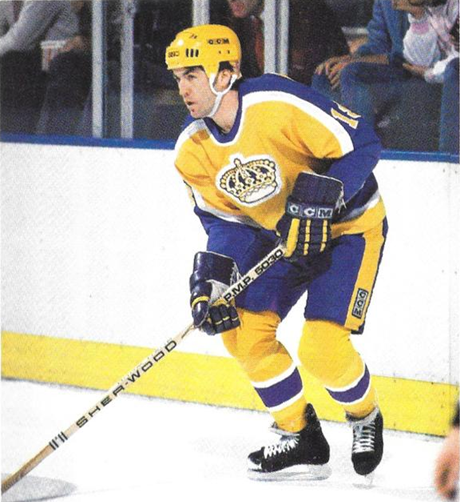
Dave Taylor modeling the gold Kings uniform in 1984, which had neck-to-cuff stripes down to the sleeves from 1980-1988. From 1967 to 1988, the Kings wore gold socks with their gold jersey, with 1970-1979 seeing them wear gold pants with the jerseys as well

The Los Angeles Kings debuted in the NHL wearing purple – officially the shade "Forum blue" – and gold uniforms. The original design was simple and straightforward, featuring monochrome striping on the shoulders and tail, as well as purple pants with white and gold trim. Later on, white trim was added on the numbers, and names were also added, while tail stripes were adjusted. At one point, gold pants were used to pair with the gold uniforms during the 1970s. A variation of the original crown logo, with a contrasting color background, was used with this uniform.

From 1980 to 1988, the Kings modified their uniforms to include a contrasting yoke that extends from sleeve to sleeve. White was also added to the socks, on the tail stripes, and at the bottom of the yoke, but the color was removed from the pants. The names and numbers were also modified to a standard NHL block lettering.

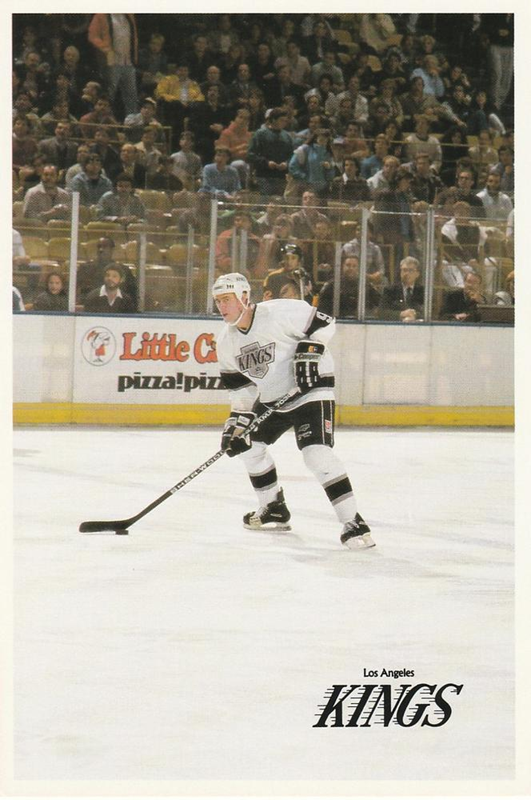
1988 postcard of Bernie Nicholls in the new black and silver jerseys of the Kings.

Just in time for Wayne Gretzky's arrival, the Kings' colors changed to black and silver, mirroring those of the Los Angeles Raiders. The team's banner logo, which previously had been modified with the word "KINGS" enlarged beyond the boundaries of the banner, was now fully enclosed, and rendered in silver and black; the enclosed logo drew comparisons to the Chevrolet bowtie logo. The new uniforms did not deviate much from the prior design, save for the color scheme, the new logo, and a switch from a contrasting yoke color to sleeve stripes containing the sleeve numbers. With minor changes to the text, number font and pant striping, the uniforms were used until the 1997–98 season.

The Kings briefly reintroduced purple and gold to the color scheme upon unveiling an alternate jersey for the 1995–96 season. The uniform featured a gradually fading black splash, medieval-inspired serif text, and a logo of a bearded figure wearing a golden crown. The so-called "Burger King" jersey proved to be unpopular with fans, and was scrapped after only one season.

Primary logo, used 1982–1988

Primary logo, used 1988–1998

For the 1998–99 season, the Kings unveiled new logos, uniforms and a new purple-silver-white color scheme, as black and silver had become associated with gang colors. The shade of purple was a lighter shade than the one used in the "Forum blue and gold" era. The new primary logo was a shield and crest featuring three royal symbols–a sunglass-clad lion, a crown and the Sun. The jerseys featured the shield logo with hints of purple on the yoke, sleeve stripes and tail. By coincidence, this was the same color scheme as the NBA's Sacramento Kings, who had rebranded to the scheme four years before the NHL's Kings did, as well as the Colorado Rockies (not to be confused with the NHL Rockies who became the New Jersey Devils) of Major League Baseball. The bottom of the jerseys read the city name. A purple alternate jersey featuring the updated secondary crown logo was unveiled for the 1999–2000 season. In 2002, the crown logo became the primary while the shield logo was demoted to alternate status. The socks on the black and purple uniforms also switched designations to match their counterparts. Upon moving to the Reebok Edge design in 2007, the jerseys were updated without the tail stripes. The purple-tinged road jerseys were used until the 2010–11 season, while the home jersey was demoted to alternate status in 2011 and remained in use until 2013.

In 2008, the Kings unveiled an alternate jersey inspired by the 1988–1998 Kings motif. The current logo, now in a black and silver banner with the updated crown logo and 'LA' abbreviation on top, made its debut with the jersey. Three years later, the Kings completed the transition back to the classic black and silver by unveiling a new away jersey, which unlike the home jersey, features a black and silver tail stripe. The Kings script from their 1988–98 logo returned on the helmets, and would stay that way until 2013, when they were replaced by the current Kings script.

From the 2010–11 to the 2016–17 seasons, the Kings have also worn their classic purple and gold jerseys from the late 1970s as part of "Legends Night" on select home dates. Minor changes in the uniform include the NHL shield logo on the neck piping, as well as the use of the Reebok Edge design.

Logos used 1998–2024

Shield logo

Crown logo

Banner logo

The shield logo served as the team's primary logo until 2002, when the alternate crown logo was designated as the Kings' primary logo, which became the alternate logo, with modifications, until 2024. The shield logo remained the team's alternate logo until 2013. The third logo, debuted in 2008 on a third jersey, elevated to the primary logo in 2011. It was demoted to a secondary one in 2024.

The Kings wore silver jerseys with white trim, black stripes and shoulder yoke during the 2014 Stadium Series. The uniforms featured a metallic treatment of the alternate crown logo in front. The sleeve numbers were slightly tilted diagonally, while the back numbers were enlarged for visibility purposes. A new 'LA' alternate logo was placed on the left shoulder yoke. For the 2015 Stadium Series, the Kings wore a tricolored jersey featuring the team's silver, black and white colors. Both the sleeve and back numbers are enlarged, while white pants were used with this jersey.

As part of the Kings' 50th anniversary in the 2016–17 season, the team wore commemorative silver alternate jerseys with a black shoulder yoke and striping for every Saturday home game. The logos and lettering were accented with metallic gold, while a purple neckline featured five gold diamonds to symbolize the Kings' original colors. A 50th Anniversary patch was adorned on the right shoulder.

Adidas signed an agreement with the NHL to be the official manufacturer of uniforms and licensed apparel for all teams, starting with the 2017–18 season, replacing Reebok. The home and away uniforms that were debuted in the 2007–08 season remained identical with the exception of the new Adidas ADIZERO template and the new collar. With the new collar, the NHL shield was moved to the front and center on a pentagon with a new "Chrome Flex" style. The waist stripes on the road white jersey became curved instead of being straight across.

In the 2018–19 season, the Kings brought back their silver alternate uniforms last used in the 2016–17 season, minus the metallic gold elements in the logo and numerals. The uniform was retired following the 2020–21 season.

During the 2019–20 season, the Kings brought back the 1992–1998 white uniform (with black letters and silver trim) as a heritage uniform for two games.

The 2020 Stadium Series saw the Kings wear special black and white uniforms with "LA" tilted upward in front, along with chrome helmets. The uniforms took cues from the angular architecture and aircraft of the United States Air Force Academy.

In the 2020–21 season, the Kings unveiled a "Reverse Retro" alternate uniform in collaboration with Adidas. The uniform essentially recreated the design worn from 1988 to 1998, but black and silver were replaced by the team's original purple and gold colors.

Before the 2021–22 season, the Kings replaced their silver alternates with a modernized version of the throwback 1990s white uniforms. The design featured slightly different striping patterns from the originals, and were paired with chrome helmets. In the 2024 Stanley Cup playoffs, the Kings opted to wear these alternates during road games, but replaced the chrome helmets with the primary white helmets.

A second "Reverse Retro" uniform was unveiled in the 2022–23 season, featuring the 1980–88 uniform but with a white base, purple stripes and gold accents.

On June 20, 2024, the Kings unveiled a new primary logo, which is a modernized version of their 1988 logo. The new uniforms were also heavily based on the 1988–1998 uniforms, but the sleeve numbers were no longer placed on the contrasting stripe as they were in the previous uniform.

On October 7, 2025, the Kings released a new alternate uniform, using a black base and silver elements. The crest in front is the team's classic "crown" logo, and the fonts used were based on the wordmark found on the primary logo. The design was highly influenced by the original purple and gold "crown" uniforms the team wore from 1967 to 1980. Like with their previous alternate uniform, these were paired with chrome helmets, though on a few occasions they also wore the black helmets.

The Kings unveiled a "Hometown Remix" uniform on November 2, 2026, featuring a predominantly purple base with black, gold and silver stripes. The design commemorated the 60th anniversary of the Kings franchise by using every color they wore on their uniforms, from the purple and gold of their early years to the current black and silver design.

=== Mascot ===
Since 2007, the mascot of the Kings is Bailey, a lion who wears No. 72 (the average temperature in Los Angeles). He was named in honor of Garnet "Ace" Bailey, who served as Director of Pro Scouting for seven years before dying in the September 11, 2001, terrorist attacks. Bailey is the second mascot, after Kingston the snow leopard in the early 1990s, who now serves as the mascot of the Kings' AHL affiliate, the Ontario Reign.

== Rivalries ==
The Kings have developed strong rivalries with the two other Californian teams of the NHL, the Anaheim Ducks – who also play in the Los Angeles metropolitan area, leading to the rivalry dubbed the "Freeway Face-Off" as both cities are separated by Interstate 5, and the rivalry with the San Jose Sharks – also reflects the animosity between Northern and Southern California. The Kings eliminated both teams during the 2014 Stanley Cup run, and have played outdoor games with them for the NHL Stadium Series, losing to the Ducks at Dodger Stadium in 2014 and beating the Sharks at Levi's Stadium the following year. During the 1980s, the Kings developed a heated rivalry with the Edmonton Oilers, which has rekindled in recent years after meeting and losing for four straight years in the first round of the playoffs against the Oilers between 2022 and 2025.

== Season-by-season record ==
List of the last five seasons completed by the Kings. For the full season-by-season history, see List of Los Angeles Kings seasons

Note: GP = Games played, W = Wins, L = Losses, T = Ties, OTL = Overtime losses/shootout losses, Pts = Points, GF = Goals for, GA = Goals against

Season	GP	W	L	OTL	Pts	GF	GA	Finish	Playoffs
2021–22	82	44	27	11	99	239	236	3rd, Pacific	Lost in first round, 3–4 (Oilers)
2022–23	82	47	25	10	104	280	257	3rd, Pacific	Lost in first round, 2–4 (Oilers)
2023–24	82	44	27	11	99	256	215	3rd, Pacific	Lost in first round, 1–4 (Oilers)
2024–25	82	48	25	9	105	250	206	2nd, Pacific	Lost in first round, 2–4 (Oilers)
2025–26	82	35	27	20	90	225	247	4th, Pacific	Lost in first round, 0–4 (Avalanche)

== Players and personnel ==
=== Current roster ===
Updated November 2, 2026

No.	Nat	Player	Pos	S/G	Age	Acquired	Birthplace
44	(United States)	Mikey Anderson (A)	D	L	27	2017	Fridley, Minnesota
40	(Finland)	Joel Armia	RW	R	33	2025	Pori, Finland
55	(Canada)	Quinton Byfield	C	L	24	2020	Newmarket, Ontario
5	(Canada)	Cody Ceci	D	R	32	2025	Ottawa, Ontario
42	(Slovakia)	Martin Chromiak	RW	R	24	2020	Ilava, Slovakia
92	(Canada)	Brandt Clarke	D	R	23	2021	Nepean, Ontario
8	(Canada)	Drew Doughty (C)	D	R	36	2008	London, Ontario
2	(United States)	Brian Dumoulin	D	L	35	2025	Biddeford, Maine
6	(Canada)	Joel Edmundson	D	L	33	2023	Brandon, Manitoba
22	(Switzerland)	Kevin Fiala	RW	L	30	2022	St. Gallen, Switzerland
31	(Sweden)	Anton Forsberg	G	L	33	2025	Härnösand, Sweden
64	(Sweden)	Erik Gustafsson	D	L	34	2026	Nynäshamn, Sweden
56	(Finland)	Erik Haula	LW	L	35	2026	Pori, Finland
79	(Finland)	Samuel Helenius	C	L	23	2021	Dallas, Texas
9	(Sweden)	Adrian Kempe (A)	LW	L	30	2014	Kramfors, Sweden
35	(Canada)	Darcy Kuemper	G	L	36	2024	Saskatoon, Saskatchewan
14	(United States)	Alex Laferriere	RW	R	25	2020	Chatham, New Jersey
21	(Canada)	Scott Laughton	C	L	32	2026	Oakville, Ontario
47	(Sweden)	Andre Lee	LW	L	26	2019	Karlstad, Sweden
12	(United States)	Trevor Moore	LW	L	31	2020	Thousand Oaks, California
10	(Russia)	Artemi Panarin (A)	LW	R	35	2026	Korkino, Soviet Union
90	(Canada)	Corey Perry	RW	R	41	2026	Peterborough, Ontario
15	(United States)	Alex Turcotte	C	L	25	2019	Elk Grove, Illinois
36	(Norway)	Mats Zuccarello	RW	L	39	2026	Oslo, Norway

=== Team captains ===
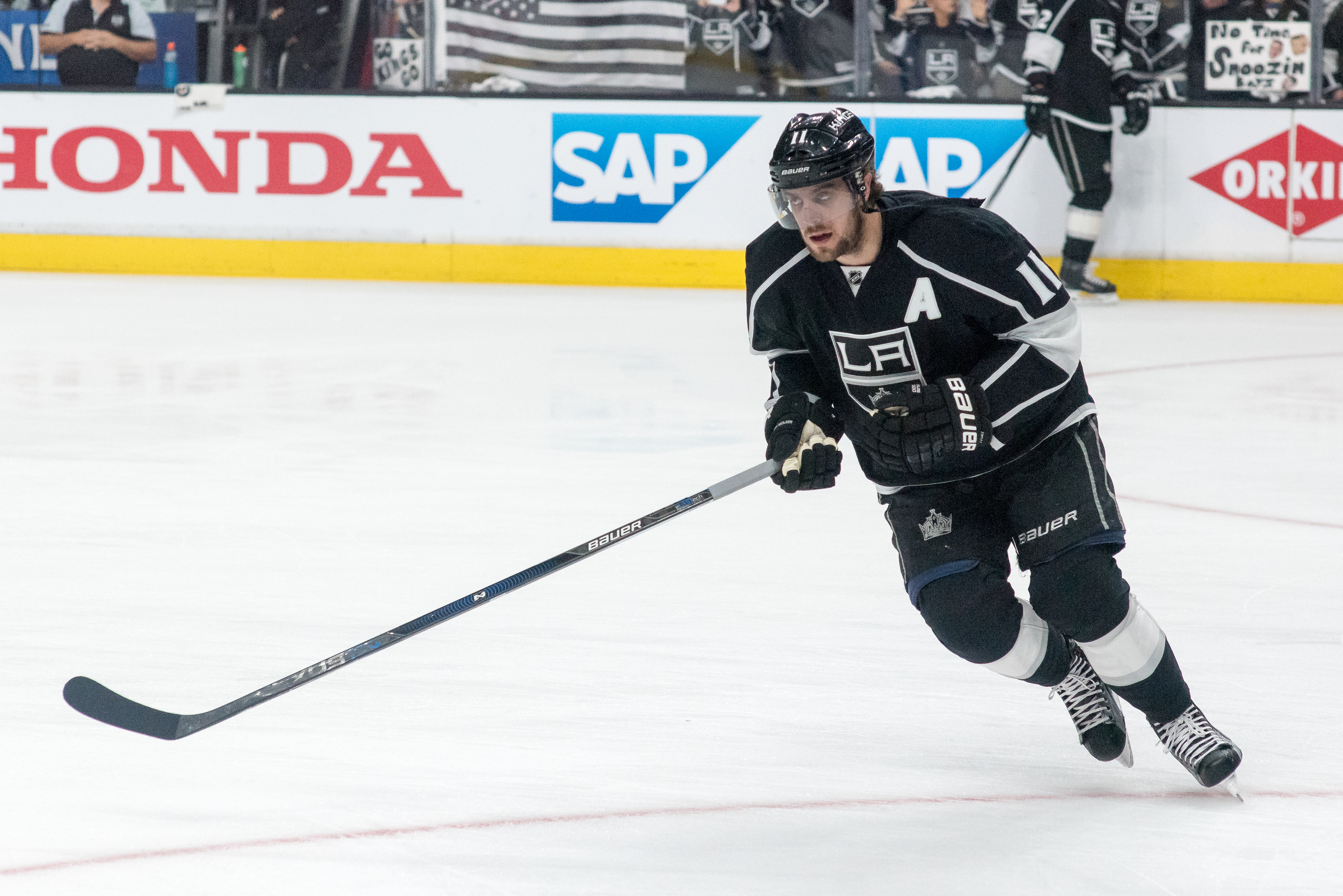
Anže Kopitar served as the team's captain from 2016 to 2026.

- Bob Wall, 1967–1969
- Larry Cahan, 1969–1971
- Bob Pulford, 1971–1973
- Terry Harper, 1973–1975
- Mike Murphy, 1975–1981
- Dave Lewis, 1981–1983
- Terry Ruskowski, 1983–1985
- Dave Taylor, 1985–1989
- Wayne Gretzky, 1989–1996
- Luc Robitaille, 1992–1993, 2006
- Rob Blake, 1996–2001, 2007–2008
- Mattias Norström, 2001–2007
- Dustin Brown, 2008–2016, 2022
- Anže Kopitar, 2016–2026
- Drew Doughty, 2026–present

=== Head coaches ===
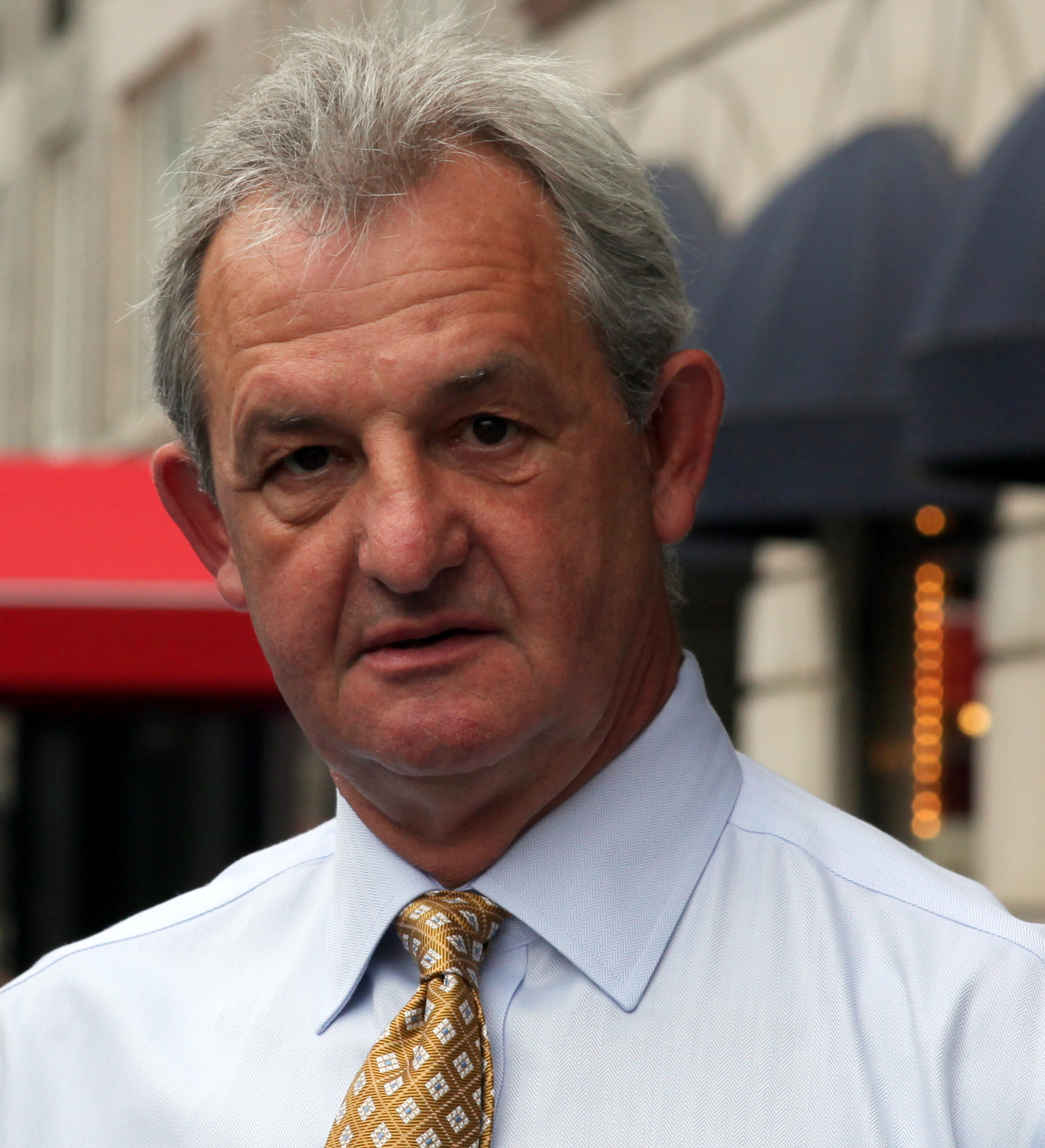
Darryl Sutter was the head coach of the Kings from 2011 to 2017.

- Red Kelly: 1967–1969
- Hal Laycoe: 1969–1970
- Johnny Wilson: 1969–1970
- Larry Regan: 1970–1972
- Fred Glover: 1971–1972
- Bob Pulford: 1972–1977
- Ron Stewart: 1977–1978
- Bob Berry: 1978–1981
- Parker MacDonald: 1981–1982
- Don Perry: 1982–1984
- Rogie Vachon (interim):^{1} 1984, 1988, 1995
- Roger Neilson: 1984
- Pat Quinn: 1984–1987
- Mike Murphy: 1987–1988
- Robbie Ftorek: 1988–1989
- Tom Webster: 1989–1992
- Barry Melrose: 1992–1995
- Larry Robinson: 1995–1999
- Andy Murray: 1999–2006
- John Torchetti (interim):^{2} 2006
- Marc Crawford: 2006–2008
- Terry Murray: 2008–2011
- John Stevens (interim):^{3} 2011, 2017–2018
- Darryl Sutter: 2011–2017
- Willie Desjardins: (interim): 2018–2019
- Todd McLellan: 2019–2024
- Jim Hiller: 2024–2026
- D. J. Smith (interim): 2026
- Peter Laviolette: 2026–present

Notes:

- ^{1} Rogie Vachon took over as interim head coach for the Kings on three occasions, the first for two games in the middle of the 1983–84 season after Don Perry was fired, then replaced by Roger Neilson. The second time was for one game in the middle of 1987–88 season after Mike Murphy was fired, then replaced by Robbie Ftorek. The third occasion was for the final seven games in the 1994–95 lockout-shortened season after Barry Melrose was fired, then replaced by Larry Robinson. In all those times, he returned to his duties in the Kings front office.
- ^{2} John Torchetti took over as interim head coach for the final 12 games of the 2005–06 season after Andy Murray was fired. Torchetti was replaced by Marc Crawford at the end of the 2005–06 season.
- ^{3} John Stevens took over as interim head coach for four games in the middle of the 2011–12 season after Terry Murray was fired. He would return to his duties as assistant coach after Darryl Sutter was hired. Stevens would return again, this time as the permanent replacement for Sutter in 2017.

=== General managers ===
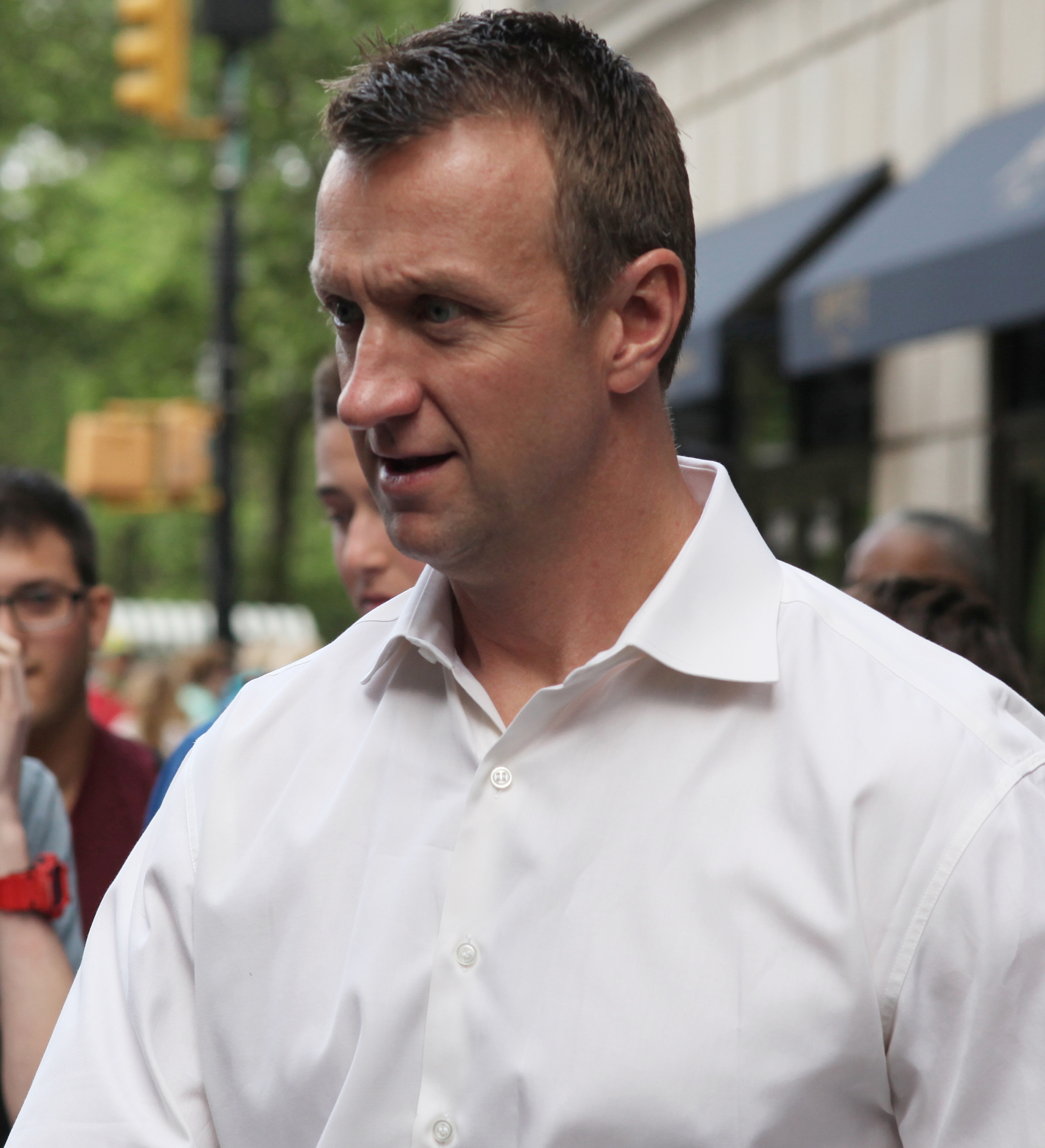
Rob Blake is the most recent general manager for the Kings, serving from 2017 to 2025.

- Larry Regan: 1967–1973
- Jake Milford: 1973–1977
- George Maguire: 1977–1984
- Rogie Vachon: 1984–1992
- Nick Beverley: 1992–1994
- Sam McMaster: 1994–1997
- Dave Taylor: 1997–2006
- Dean Lombardi: 2006–2017
- Rob Blake: 2017–2025
- Ken Holland: 2025–

=== Team owners ===
- Jack Kent Cooke: 1967–1979
- Jerry Buss: 1979–1988
- Bruce McNall: 1988–1994
- Joseph M. Cohen and Jeffery Sudikoff: 1994–1995
- Philip Anschutz and Edward Roski: 1995–present

== Team and league honors ==
=== Retired numbers ===
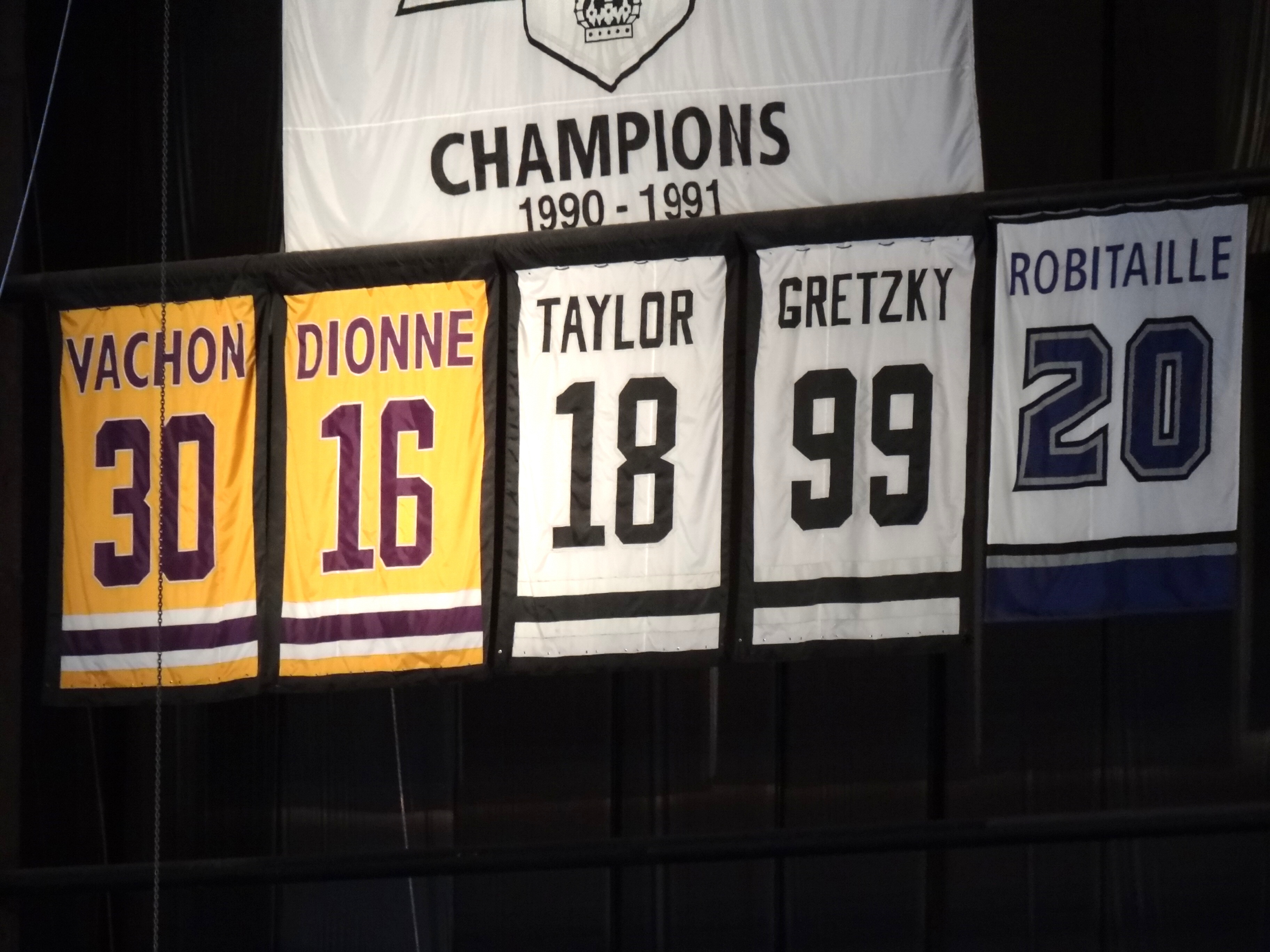
Five of the Kings retired jersey banners hanging from the rafters in 2012

Los Angeles Kings retired numbers
No.	Player	Position	Tenure	No. retirement
4	Rob Blake	D	1990–2001; 2006–2008	January 17, 2015
16	Marcel Dionne	C	1975–1987	November 8, 1990
18	Dave Taylor	RW	1977–1994	April 3, 1995
20	Luc Robitaille	LW	1986–1994; 1997–2001; 2003–2006	January 20, 2007
23	Dustin Brown	RW	2003–2022	February 11, 2023
30	Rogie Vachon	G	1972–1978	February 14, 1985
99 (Note: The NHL retired Gretzky's No. 99 for all its member teams at the 2000 NHL All-Star Game; the Kings held their own personal celebration of the number's retirement in 2002.)	Wayne Gretzky	C	1988–1996	October 9, 2002

Additionally, Anže Kopitar's no. 11 is scheduled to be retired by the Kings on February 24, 2027.

- Bob Miller, broadcaster, 1973–2017, recognized with an honorary banner that hangs from the rafters at Crypto.com Arena

=== Hall of Fame ===
The Los Angeles Kings acknowledge an affiliation with a number of inductees to the Hockey Hall of Fame, including 19 former players (five of whom earned their credentials primarily as Kings) and three builders of the sport. The three individuals recognized as builders by the Hall of Fame includes former Kings head coaches, and general managers. In addition to players and builders, athletic trainers have been inducted into the Hall of Fame through the Professional Hockey Athletic Trainers Society, and the Society of Professional Hockey Equipment Managers. Two athletic trainers from the Kings organization were inducted into the Hall of Fame: Peter Demers in 2007 and Mark O'Neill in 2016.

Three sports broadcasters for the Kings were awarded the Foster Hewitt Memorial Award for their contributions to hockey broadcasting: Jiggs McDonald (1990), Bob Miller (2000), and Nick Nickson (2015). In 2005, Helene Elliott, a sportswriter for the Los Angeles Times was awarded the Elmer Ferguson Memorial Award for her contributions to sports journalism.

Players

- Rob Blake
- Paul Coffey
- Marcel Dionne
- Dick Duff
- Grant Fuhr
- Wayne Gretzky
- Harry Howell
- Jarome Iginla
- Brian Kilrea
- Jari Kurri
- Larry Murphy
- Bob Pulford
- Larry Robinson
- Luc Robitaille
- Jeremy Roenick
- Terry Sawchuk
- Steve Shutt
- Billy Smith
- Rogie Vachon

Builders

- Red Kelly
- Jake Milford
- Roger Neilson

=== Franchise records ===
==== Scoring leaders ====
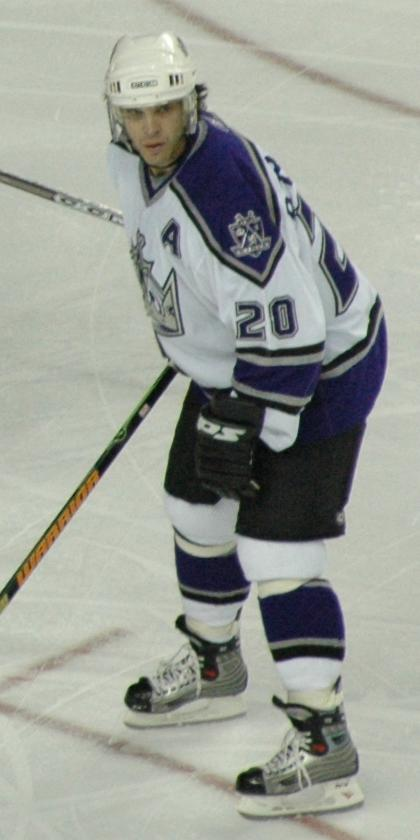
Luc Robitaille is the franchise's all-time leader in goals scored with 557.

These are the top-ten regular season scorers in franchise history. Figures are updated after each completed NHL regular season.

- * – current Kings player

Note: Pos = Position; GP = Games played; G = Goals; A = Assists; Pts = Points; P/G = Points per game

Points
Player	Pos	GP	G	A	Pts	P/G
Anže Kopitar	C	1,521	452	864	1,316	.87
Marcel Dionne	C	921	550	757	1,307	1.42
Luc Robitaille	LW	1,079	557	597	1,154	1.07
Dave Taylor	RW	1,111	431	638	1,069	.96
Wayne Gretzky	C	539	246	672	918	1.70
Bernie Nicholls	C	602	327	431	758	1.26
Dustin Brown	RW	1,296	325	387	712	.55
Drew Doughty*	D	1,279	165	544	709	.55
Butch Goring	C	736	275	384	659	.90
Rob Blake	D	805	161	333	494	.61

Goals
Player	Pos	G
Luc Robitaille	LW	557
Marcel Dionne	C	550
Anže Kopitar	C	452
Dave Taylor	RW	431
Bernie Nicholls	C	327
Dustin Brown	RW	325
Butch Goring	C	275
Wayne Gretzky	C	246
Adrian Kempe*	RW	230
Charlie Simmer	LW	222

Assists
Player	Pos	A
Anže Kopitar	C	864
Marcel Dionne	C	757
Wayne Gretzky	C	672
Dave Taylor	RW	638
Luc Robitaille	LW	597
Drew Doughty*	D	544
Bernie Nicholls	C	431
Dustin Brown	RW	387
Butch Goring	C	384
Rob Blake	D	333

==== Goaltending leaders ====
These are the top-ten goaltenders in franchise history by wins. Figures are updated after each completed NHL regular season.

- * – current Kings player

Note: GP = Games played; W = Wins; L = Losses; T/O = Ties/Overtime losses; GA = Goal against; GAA = Goals against average; SA = Shots against; SV% = Save percentage; SO = Shutouts

Goaltenders
Player	GP	W	L	T/O	GA	GAA	SA	SV%	SO
Jonathan Quick	743	370	275	82	1,772	2.46	19,960	.911	57
Rogie Vachon	389	171	148	66	1,091	2.86	11,058	.901	32
Kelly Hrudey	360	145	135	55	1,185	3.47	11,336	.895	10
Mario Lessard	240	92	97	39	844	3.75	6,714	.874	9
Jamie Storr	205	85	78	21	456	2.52	5,055	.910	16
Stéphane Fiset	200	80	85	22	532	2.83	5,692	.907	10
Felix Potvin	136	61	52	16	308	2.35	3,244	.905	14
Darcy Kuemper*	119	60	26	25	269	2.35	3,017	.911	11
Gary Edwards	155	54	68	22	497	3.39	4,499	.890	7
Cal Petersen	101	44	42	10	284	2.92	2,978	.905	4

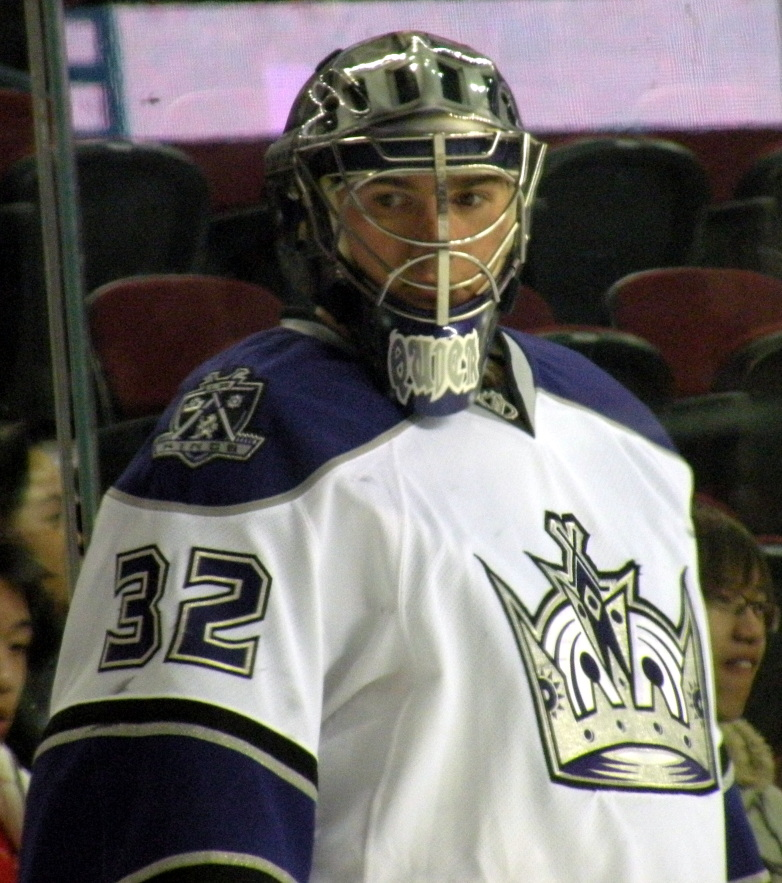
Recording 10 shutouts during the 2011–12 season, Jonathan Quick holds the franchise record for most shutouts in a season.

Regular season records

- Most goals: Bernie Nicholls, 70 (1988–89)
- Most assists: Wayne Gretzky, 122 (1990–91)
- Most points: Wayne Gretzky, 168 (1988–89)
- Most points in a game: Bernie Nicholls, 8 (1988–89)
- Most penalty minutes: Marty McSorley, 399 (1992–93)
- Most points, defenseman: Larry Murphy, 76 (1980–81)
- Most points, rookie: Luc Robitaille, 84 (1986–87)
- Most wins: Jonathan Quick, 40 (2015–16)
- Most shutouts: Jonathan Quick, 10 (2011–12)

Playoff records

- Most goals: Wayne Gretzky, 15 (1992–93)
- Most assists: Wayne Gretzky, 25 (1992–93)
- Most points: Wayne Gretzky, 40 (1992–93)
- Most points in a game: Tomas Sandström, Tony Granato, Wayne Gretzky, 5 (1989–90)
- Most penalty minutes: Jay Miller, 63 (1988–89)
- Most points, defenseman: Drew Doughty, 18 (2013–14)
- Most points, rookie: Tyler Toffoli, 14 (2013–14)
- Most wins: Jonathan Quick, 16 (2011–12, 2013–14)
- Most shutouts: Jonathan Quick, 3 (2011–12, 2012–13)

Team records

- Most points in a season: 105 (1974–75)
- Most wins in a season: 48 (2015–16)
- Longest regular season winning streak: 9 (2009–10)
- Longest playoff winning streak: 8 (2011–12)

== Broadcasters ==
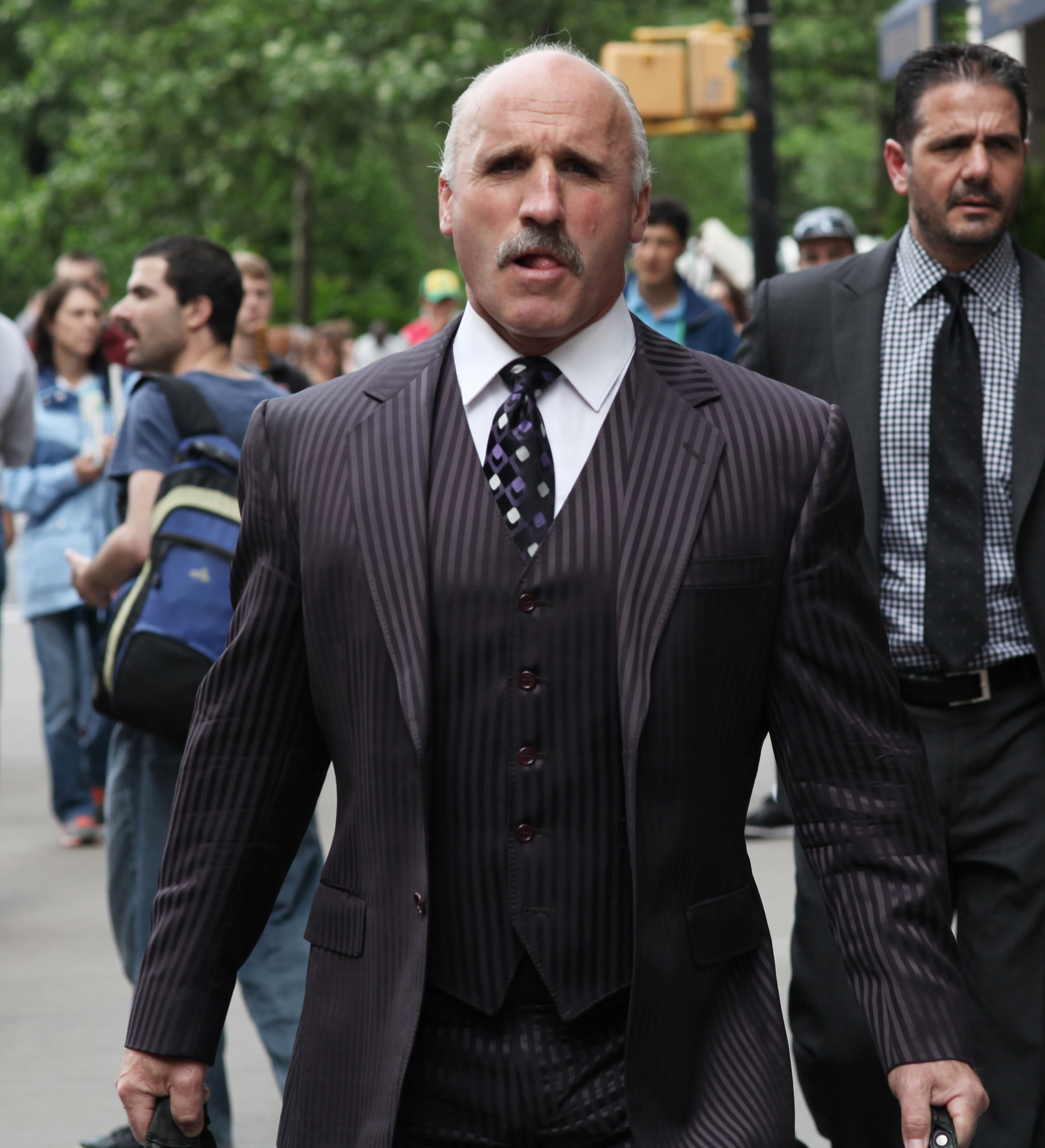
Daryl Evans is the Kings' current radio color commentator.

In 1973, the Kings hired Bob Miller as their play-by-play announcer. Considered to be one of the finest hockey play-by-play announcers, Miller held the post continuously until retirement in 2017, and is often referred to as the Voice of the Kings. He received the Foster Hewitt Memorial Award from the NHL Hockey Broadcasters Association on November 13, 2000, making him a media honoree for the Hockey Hall of Fame, and he also earned a star in the Hollywood Walk of Fame in 2006. Miller has written two books about his experiences with the team, Bob Miller's Tales of the Los Angeles Kings (2006), and Tales From The Los Angeles Kings Locker Room: A Collection Of The Greatest Kings Stories Ever Told (2013). On March 2, 2017, citing health reasons, Miller announced his retirement after 44 years with the team, and finished his career broadcasting the final two games of the 2016–17 Kings season. The Kings named NBCSN announcer Alex Faust as Miller's replacement, play-by-play announcer the team on TV for the 2017–18 season on June 1, 2017.

On September 18, 2018. the team announced that it would cease over-the-air radio broadcasts, and had partnered with iHeartMedia to form the Los Angeles Kings Audio Network, which streams exclusively on the iHeartRadio platform. The deal also includes pre-game shows and other ancillary content streaming on iHeartRadio. Two pre-season games were simulcast by KEIB before the transition was completed.

On June 5, 2023, the Kings parted ways with Alex Faust and planned on returning to a TV/radio simulcast format with Nick Nickson, Jim Fox and Daryl Evans, which they last used in the 1989–90 season.

On September 14, 2023, the Kings announced a new contract with Bally Sports West, airing around 65 games, and KCAL-TV, airing around 6 games.

On June 20, 2024, the Kings announced a new deal with ESPN Radio 710 to stream all games on the ESPN LA app, with 25 games to simulcast on the radio.

Nick Nickson retired after the 2024–25 season, and the Kings reverted to employing separate radio and television announce teams. On September 11, 2025, former St. Louis Blues announcer John Kelly was hired to call games on television, while Josh Schaefer was promoted to lead play-by-play on radio. On games where Kelly was assigned to work nationally for ESPN, Schaefer would take over on television. Additionally, the Kings brought in former players Ray Ferraro, Tony Granato and Jarret Stoll to rotate alongside lead analyst Jim Fox on television.

On March 9, 2026, the Los Angeles Angels announced that they would acquire FanDuel Sports Network West from Main Street Sports Group, amid an expected winddown of the company's operations due to financial issues. The Angels also announced that they would renew the channel's rights to the Kings for the 2026–27 season, In a transitional move, it was announced on March 18 that the remainder of the team's regional games for the season would air on now-former sister channel FanDuel Sports Network SoCal.

On September 18, 2026 the Los Angeles Kings announce that they will be joining Angels Broadcast Television and DAZN for the 2026-27 and the 2027-28 season.

Television: ABTV and DAZN

- John Kelly – lead play-by-play
- Jim Fox – lead analyst
- Alec Martinez – analyst
- Daryl Evans – analyst
- Tony Granato – analyst
- Jarret Stoll – analyst
- Patrick O'Neal (sportscaster) – host
- Carrlyn Bathe - host/reporter

Radio: ESPN Radio 710 and La Primera 1330

- Josh Schaefer – English lead radio play-by-play
- Francisco X. River – Espanol lead radio play-by-play
- Jared Shafan – play-by-play
- Daryl Evans – lead analyst
- Zach Dooley – analyst
- Sam Betesh – Kings Talk co-host

Public address:

- David Courtney 1989–2012
- Dave Joseph 2013–2020
- Trevor Rabone 2021–present

== Affiliate teams ==
The Kings are currently affiliated with the Ontario Reign in the American Hockey League, they also have an affiliation with the Greenville Swamp Rabbits in the ECHL. Previous affiliates included the Manchester Monarchs, Lowell Lock Monsters, Springfield Falcons, New Haven Nighthawks, Binghamton Dusters and Springfield Kings of the AHL; Manchester Monarchs and Reading Royals in the ECHL; Long Beach Ice Dogs, Phoenix Roadrunners and Utah Grizzlies in the International Hockey League; and the Houston Apollos of the Central Hockey League.

== See also ==
- 1967 NHL expansion
- List of NHL players
- List of NHL seasons
- Crypto.com Arena

== Notes ==
Preceded by Boston Bruins	Stanley Cup champions 2011–12	Succeeded by Chicago Blackhawks
Preceded by Chicago Blackhawks	Stanley Cup champions 2013–14	Succeeded by Chicago Blackhawks
