= George Maguire (ice hockey) =

George Maguire (born c. 1922 in Ottawa, Ontario, Canada) was the General Manager of the Los Angeles Kings from May 28, 1977 to January 30, 1984. Before joining the Kings, Maguire spent 17 years as a professional scout for the Boston Bruins, Montreal Canadiens and Minnesota North Stars as well as Chief Scout for the Los Angeles Kings beginning in 1969. Maguire died in 2005.
