= List of Los Angeles Kings award winners =

Los Angeles Kings awards
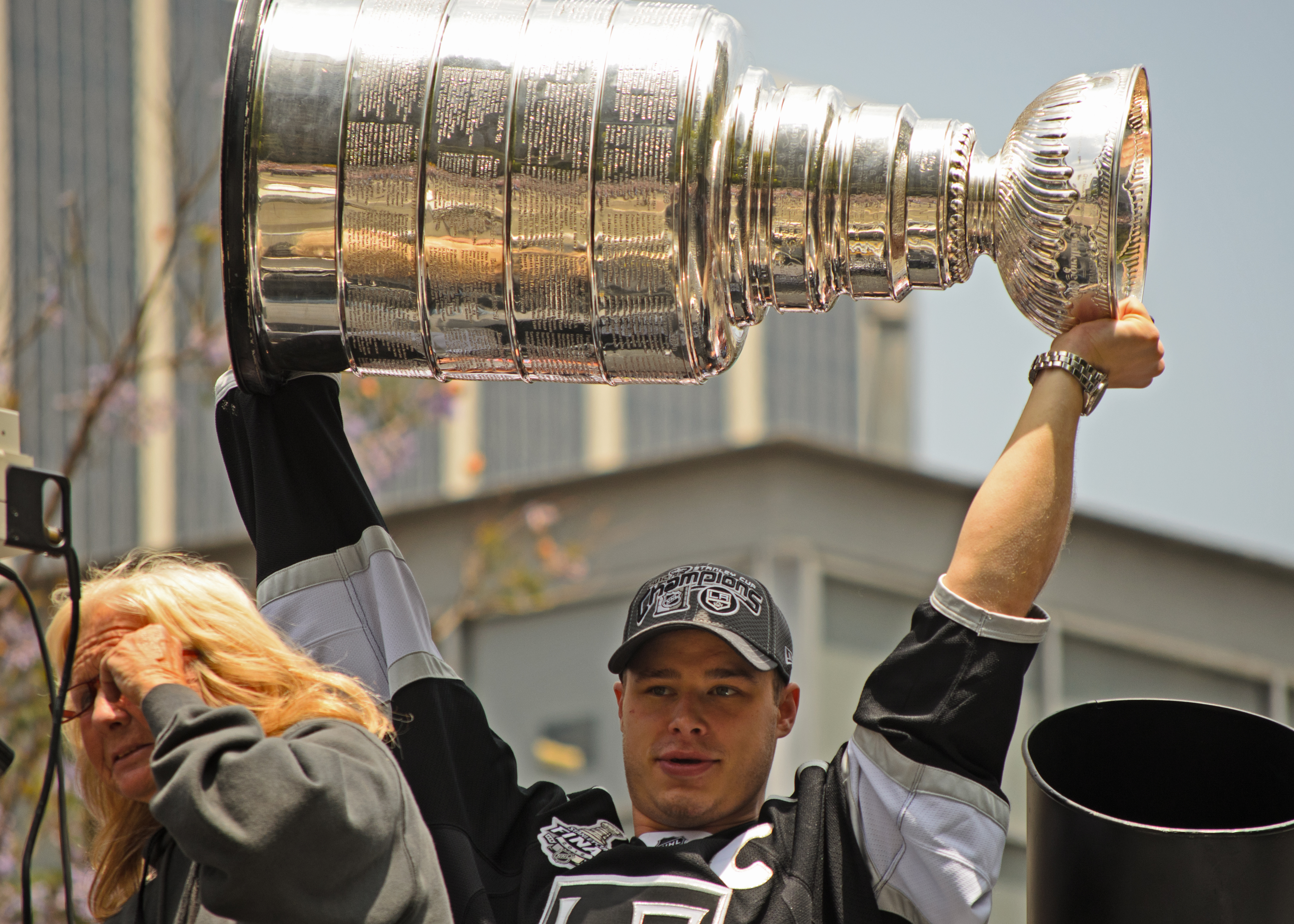
- Dustin Brown with the Stanley Cup in 2012.

Team trophies
- Award*: Wins
- Stanley Cup: 2
- Clarence S. Campbell Bowl: 3

Individual awards
- Award*: Wins
- Art Ross Trophy: 4
- Bill Masterton Memorial Trophy: 3
- Calder Memorial Trophy: 1
- Charlie Conacher Memorial Trophy: 1
- Conn Smythe Trophy: 2
- Frank J. Selke Trophy: 2
- Hart Memorial Trophy: 1
- Jack Adams Award: 1
- James Norris Memorial Trophy: 2
- King Clancy Memorial Trophy: 1
- Lady Byng Memorial Trophy: 8
- Lester Patrick Trophy: 4
- Mark Messier Leadership Award: 2
- NHL Foundation Player Award: 1
- NHL Plus-Minus Award: 1
- Ted Lindsay Award: 2
- William M. Jennings Trophy: 2

Total
- Awards won: 43

The Los Angeles Kings are a professional ice hockey team based in Los Angeles. They are members of the Pacific Division of the Western Conference in the National Hockey League (NHL). The club was founded in 1967 as one of the League's expansion teams.

The Kings have won numerous team and individual awards and honors. They won the Stanley Cup as the League champions in 2012 and again in 2014.

== League awards ==
=== Team trophies ===
The Kings have won the Western (previously the Campbell) Conference three times, in 1992–93, 2011–12 and 2013–14. They won two Stanley Cup championships in 2011–12 and in 2013–14.

Team trophies awarded to the Los Angeles Kings
Award	Description	Times won	Seasons	References
Stanley Cup	NHL championship	2	2011–12, 2013–14	
Clarence S. Campbell Bowl	Western Conference playoff championship	3	1992–93, 2011–12, 2013–14	

=== Individual trophies ===
Individual awards won by Los Angeles Kings players and staff
Award	Description	Winner	Season	References
Art Ross Trophy	Regular season scoring champion	Marcel Dionne	1979–80	
Art Ross Trophy	Regular season scoring champion	Wayne Gretzky	1989–90	
Art Ross Trophy	Regular season scoring champion	Wayne Gretzky	1990–91	
Art Ross Trophy	Regular season scoring champion	Wayne Gretzky	1993–94	
Bill Masterton Memorial Trophy	Perseverance, sportsmanship, and dedication to hockey	Butch Goring	1977–78	
Bill Masterton Memorial Trophy	Perseverance, sportsmanship, and dedication to hockey	Bob Bourne	1987–88	
Bill Masterton Memorial Trophy	Perseverance, sportsmanship, and dedication to hockey	Dave Taylor	1990–91	
Calder Memorial Trophy	Rookie of the year	Luc Robitaille	1986–87	
Conn Smythe Trophy	Most valuable player of the playoffs	Jonathan Quick	2011–12	
Conn Smythe Trophy	Most valuable player of the playoffs	Justin Williams	2013–14	
Frank J. Selke Trophy	Forward who best excels in the defensive aspect of the game	Anze Kopitar	2015–16	
Frank J. Selke Trophy	Forward who best excels in the defensive aspect of the game	Anze Kopitar	2017–18	
Hart Memorial Trophy	Most valuable player to his team during the regular season	Wayne Gretzky	1988–89	
Jack Adams Award	National Hockey League coach "adjudged to have contributed the most to his team's success."	Bob Pulford	1974–75	
James Norris Memorial Trophy	Defense player of the year	Rob Blake	1997–98	
James Norris Memorial Trophy	Defense player of the year	Drew Doughty	2015–16	
Lady Byng Memorial Trophy	Gentlemanly conduct	Marcel Dionne	1976–77	
Lady Byng Memorial Trophy	Gentlemanly conduct	Butch Goring	1977–78	
Lady Byng Memorial Trophy	Gentlemanly conduct	Wayne Gretzky	1990–91	
Lady Byng Memorial Trophy	Gentlemanly conduct	Wayne Gretzky	1991–92	
Lady Byng Memorial Trophy	Gentlemanly conduct	Wayne Gretzky	1993–94	
Lady Byng Memorial Trophy	Gentlemanly conduct	Anze Kopitar	2015–16	
Lady Byng Memorial Trophy	Gentlemanly conduct	Anze Kopitar	2022–23	
Lady Byng Memorial Trophy	Gentlemanly conduct	Anze Kopitar	2024–25	
Mark Messier Leadership Award	Leadership and contributions to society	Dustin Brown	2013–14	
Mark Messier Leadership Award	Leadership and contributions to society	Anze Kopitar	2021–22	
NHL Plus-Minus Award	Best plus/minus	Marty McSorley	1990–91	
NHL Foundation Player Award	Community service	Dustin Brown	2010–11	
Ted Lindsay Award	Most valuable player as chosen by the players	Marcel Dionne	1978–79	
Ted Lindsay Award	Most valuable player as chosen by the players	Marcel Dionne	1979–80	
William M. Jennings Trophy	Fewest goals given up in the regular season	Jonathan Quick	2013–14	
William M. Jennings Trophy	Fewest goals given up in the regular season	Jonathan Quick	2017–18	

== All-Stars ==
=== NHL first and second team All-Stars ===
The NHL first and second team All-Stars are the top players at each position as voted on by the Professional Hockey Writers' Association.

Los Angeles Kings selected to the NHL First and Second Team All-Stars
Player	Position	Selections	Season	Team
Rob Blake	Defense	2	1997–98	1st
Rob Blake	Defense	2	1999–2000	2nd
Marcel Dionne	Center	4	1976–77	1st
Marcel Dionne	Center	4	1978–79	2nd
Marcel Dionne	Center	4	1979–80	1st
Marcel Dionne	Center	4	1980–81	2nd
Drew Doughty	Defense	4	2009–10	2nd
Drew Doughty	Defense	4	2014–15	2nd
Drew Doughty	Defense	4	2015–16	1st
Drew Doughty	Defense	4	2017–18	1st
Wayne Gretzky	Center	4	1988–89	2nd
Wayne Gretzky	Center	4	1989–90	2nd
Wayne Gretzky	Center	4	1990–91	1st
Wayne Gretzky	Center	4	1993–94	2nd
Mario Lessard	Goaltender	1	1980–81	2nd
Jonathan Quick	Goaltender	1	2011–12	2nd
Luc Robitaille	Left wing	8	1986–87	2nd
Luc Robitaille	Left wing	8	1987–88	1st
Luc Robitaille	Left wing	8	1988–89	1st
Luc Robitaille	Left wing	8	1989–90	1st
Luc Robitaille	Left wing	8	1990–91	1st
Luc Robitaille	Left wing	8	1991–92	2nd
Luc Robitaille	Left wing	8	1992–93	1st
Luc Robitaille	Left wing	8	2000–01	2nd
Charlie Simmer	Left wing	2	1979–80	1st
Charlie Simmer	Left wing	2	1980–81	1st
Dave Taylor	Right wing	1	1980–81	2nd
Rogie Vachon	Goaltender	2	1974–75	2nd
Rogie Vachon	Goaltender	2	1976–77	2nd

=== NHL All-Rookie Team ===
The NHL All-Rookie Team consists of the top rookies at each position as voted on by the Professional Hockey Writers' Association.

Los Angeles Kings selected to the NHL All-Rookie Team
Player	Position	Season
Rob Blake	Defense	1990–91
Jimmy Carson	Forward	1986–87
Drew Doughty	Defense	2008–09
Steve Duchesne	Defense	1986–87
Luc Robitaille	Forward	1986–87
Jamie Storr	Goaltender	1997–98
Jamie Storr	Goaltender	1998–99
Lubomir Visnovsky	Defense	2000–01

=== All-Star Game selections ===
The National Hockey League All-Star Game is a mid-season exhibition game held annually between many of the top players of each season. Forty-four All-Star Games have been held since the Kings entered the League in 1967, with at least one player chosen to represent the Kings in each year. The All-Star Game has not been held in various years: 1979 and 1987 due to the 1979 Challenge Cup and Rendez-vous '87 series between the NHL and the Soviet national team, respectively; 1995, 2005 and 2013 as a result of labor stoppages; 2006, 2010, 2014 and 2026 due to the Winter Olympic Games; 2021 as a result of the COVID-19 pandemic; and 2025 when it was replaced by the 2025 4 Nations Face-Off. Los Angeles has hosted three All-Star Games. The 33rd Game took place at The Forum while the 52nd Game and 62nd Game took place at Staples Center.

- † Selected by fan vote
- ‡ Selected by Commissioner
- ↑ All-Star Game Most Valuable Player

Los Angeles Kings players and coaches selected to the All-Star Game
Game	Year	Name	Position
21st	1968	Eddie Joyal (Did not play)	Center
21st	1968	Terry Sawchuk	Goaltender
22nd	1969	Bill White	Center
23rd	1970	Bill White	Center
24th	1971	Bill Flett	Right wing
25th	1972	Ross Lonsberry	Left wing
26th	1973	Bob Berry	Left wing
26th	1973	Terry Harper	Defense
26th	1973	Gilles Marotte	Defense
26th	1973	Rogie Vachon	Goaltender
27th	1974	Bob Berry	Left wing
28th	1975	Terry Harper	Defense
28th	1975	Bob Murdoch	Defense
28th	1975	Rogie Vachon	Goaltender
29th	1976	Marcel Dionne	Center
30th	1977	Peter Demers	Trainer
30th	1977	Marcel Dionne	Center
31st	1978	Marcel Dionne	Center
31st	1978	Rogie Vachon	Goaltender
32nd	1980	Marcel Dionne	Center
32nd	1980	Butch Goring (Subbed for Simmer)	Center
32nd	1980	Mike Murphy (Subbed for Taylor)	Right wing
32nd	1980	Charlie Simmer (Did not play)	Left wing
32nd	1980	Dave Taylor (Did not play)	Right wing
33rd	1981	Peter Demers	Trainer
33rd	1981	Marcel Dionne	Center
33rd	1981	Mario Lessard	Goaltender
33rd	1981	Charlie Simmer	Left wing
33rd	1981	Dave Taylor	Right wing
34th	1982	Dave Taylor	Right wing
35th	1983	Marcel Dionne	Center
36th	1984	Marcel Dionne (Did not play)	Center
36th	1984	Bernie Nicholls (Subbed for Dionne)	Center
36th	1984	Charlie Simmer (Subbed for Jari Kurri)	Left wing
37th	1985	Marcel Dionne	Center
38th	1986	Dave Taylor	Right wing
39th	1988	Luc Robitaille†	Left wing
40th	1989	Steve Duchesne†	Defense
40th	1989	Wayne Gretzky†↑	Center
40th	1989	Bernie Nicholls	Center
40th	1989	Luc Robitaille†	Left wing
41st	1990	Steve Duchesne	Defense
41st	1990	Wayne Gretzky†	Center
41st	1990	Bernie Nicholls	Center
41st	1990	Luc Robitaille†	Left wing
42nd	1991	Wayne Gretzky†	Center
42nd	1991	Luc Robitaille†	Left wing
42nd	1991	Tomas Sandstrom	Right wing
43rd	1992	Wayne Gretzky†	Center
43rd	1992	Larry Robinson‡	Defense
43rd	1992	Luc Robitaille†	Left wing
44th	1993	Peter Demers	Trainer
44th	1993	Wayne Gretzky	Center
44th	1993	Jari Kurri	Right wing
44th	1993	Luc Robitaille	Left wing
45th	1994	Rob Blake	Defense
45th	1994	Wayne Gretzky†	Center
45th	1994	Barry Melrose	Coach
45th	1994	Dave Taylor‡	Right wing
46th	1996	Wayne Gretzky†	Center
47th	1997	Rob Blake (Did not play)	Defense
47th	1997	Dmitri Khristich (Subbed for Blake)	Right wing
48th	1998	No Kings selected	—
49th	1999	Rob Blake	Defense
49th	1999	Mattias Norstrom	Defense
49th	1999	Luc Robitaille	Left wing
50th	2000	Rob Blake†	Defense
51st	2001	Rob Blake	Defense
51st	2001	Zigmund Palffy	Right wing
51st	2001	Luc Robitaille	Left wing
52nd	2002	Peter Demers	Trainer
52nd	2002	Jaroslav Modry	Defense
52nd	2002	Zigmund Palffy	Right wing
53rd	2003	Mathieu Schneider	Defense
54th	2004	Zigmund Palffy (Did not play)	Right wing
54th	2004	Mattias Norstrom (Subbed for Palffy)	Defense
55th	2007	Lubomir Visnovsky	Defense
56th	2008	Anze Kopitar	Center
57th	2009	Dustin Brown	Right wing
58th	2011	Anze Kopitar	Center
59th	2012	Jonathan Quick	Goaltender
60th	2015	Drew Doughty	Defense
60th	2015	Anze Kopitar	Center
60th	2015	Darryl Sutter	Coach
61st	2016	Drew Doughty	Defense
61st	2016	Jonathan Quick	Goaltender
61st	2016	Darryl Sutter	Coach
62nd	2017	Jeff Carter	Center
62nd	2017	Drew Doughty	Defense
63rd	2018	Drew Doughty	Defense
63rd	2018	Anze Kopitar	Center
63rd	2018	Jonathan Quick (Did not play)	Goaltender
64th	2019	Drew Doughty	Defense
65th	2020	Anze Kopitar	Center
66th	2022	Adrian Kempe	Left wing
67th	2023	Kevin Fiala	Left wing
68th	2024	Cam Talbot	Goaltender

=== All-Star Game replacement events ===
Los Angeles Kings players and coaches selected to All-Star Game replacement events
Event	Year	Name	Position
Challenge Cup	1979	Marcel Dionne	Center
Rendez-vous '87	1987	No Kings selected	—
4 Nations Face-Off	2025	Drew Doughty (Canada)	Defense
4 Nations Face-Off	2025	Adrian Kempe (Sweden)	Right wing

== Career achievements ==
=== Hockey Hall of Fame ===
The following is a list of Los Angeles Kings who have been enshrined in the Hockey Hall of Fame.

Los Angeles Kings inducted into the Hockey Hall of Fame
Individual	Category	Year inducted	Years with Kings in category	References
Rob Blake	Player	2014	1990–2001, 2006–2008	
Paul Coffey	Player	2004	1991–1993	
Marcel Dionne	Player	1992	1975–1987	
Dick Duff	Player	2006	1970	
Grant Fuhr	Player	2003	1995	
Wayne Gretzky	Player	1999	1988–1996	
Ken Holland	Builder	2020	2025–present	
Harry Howell	Player	1979	1971–1973	
Jarome Iginla	Player	2020	2017	
Jari Kurri	Player	2001	1991–1996	
Jake Milford	Builder	1984	1973–1977	
Larry Murphy	Player	2004	1980–1984	
Roger Neilson	Builder	2002	1984	
Bob Pulford	Player	1991	1970–1972	
Pat Quinn	Builder	2016	1984–1986	
Larry Robinson	Player	1995	1989–1992	
Luc Robitaille	Player	2009	1986–1994, 1997–2001, 2003–2006	
Jeremy Roenick	Player	2024	2005–2006	
Terry Sawchuk	Player	1971	1967–1968	
Steve Shutt	Player	1993	1984–1985	
Billy Smith	Player	1993	1971–1972	
Rogie Vachon	Player	2016	1971–1978	

=== Foster Hewitt Memorial Award ===
Two members of the Kings organization have been honored with the Foster Hewitt Memorial Award. The award is presented by the Hockey Hall of Fame to members of the radio and television industry who make outstanding contributions to their profession and the game of ice hockey during their broadcasting career.

Members of the Los Angeles Kings honored with the Foster Hewitt Memorial Award
Individual	Year honored	Years with Kings as broadcaster	References
Jiggs McDonald	1990	1967–1973	
Bob Miller	2000	1973–2017	
Nick Nickson	2015	1981–2025	

=== Lester Patrick Trophy ===
The Lester Patrick Trophy has been presented by the National Hockey League and USA Hockey since 1966 to honor a recipient's contribution to ice hockey in the United States. This list includes all personnel who have ever been employed by the Los Angeles Kings in any capacity and have also received the Lester Patrick Trophy.

Members of the Los Angeles Kings honored with the Lester Patrick Trophy
Individual	Year honored	Years with Kings	References
Bob Crocker	2015	2005–present	
Wayne Gretzky	1994	1988–1996	
Bruce McNall	1993	1986–1994	
Terry Sawchuk	1971	1967–1968	

=== United States Hockey Hall of Fame ===
Members of the Los Angeles Kings inducted into the United States Hockey Hall of Fame
Individual	Year inducted	Years with Kings	References
Neal Broten	2000	1996–1997	
Dustin Brown	2023	2003–2022	
Bobby Carpenter	2007	1987–1989	
Dave Langevin	1993	1986–1987	
Jeremy Roenick	2010	2005–2006	
Mathieu Schneider	2015	2000–2003	

=== Retired numbers ===
The Los Angeles Kings have retired six numbers, including Wayne Gretzky's number which was also retired league-wide. The first jersey retired was #30 in honor of Rogie Vachon, who goaltended for the club from 1972 to 1978. In 1985 #16 belonging to Marcel Dionne was retired. Five years later in 1995 the Kings retired former teammate of Dionne, Dave Taylor's #18 after seventeen years with the team. Wayne Gretzky's #99 was retired by the league in 2000 and later by the Kings in 2002. The most recent number retired was #23, for Dustin Brown in 2023.

Los Angeles Kings retired numbers
Number	Player	Position	Years with Kings	Date of retirement ceremony	References
4	Rob Blake	Defense	1990–2001, 2006–2008	January 17, 2015	
16	Marcel Dionne	Center	1975–1987	November 8, 1990	
18	Dave Taylor	Right wing	1977–1994	April 3, 1995	
20	Luc Robitaille	Left wing	1986–1994, 1997–2001, 2003–2006	January 20, 2007	
23	Dustin Brown	Right wing	2003–2022	February 11, 2023	
30	Rogie Vachon	Goaltender	1971–1978	February 14, 1985	
99	Wayne Gretzky	Center	1988–1996	October 9, 2002	
	Bob Miller	Broadcaster	1973–2017	January 13, 2018	

=== Kings Hall of Fame ===
Members of the Los Angeles Kings inducted into the Kings Hall of Fame
Individual	Primary role with Kings	Years with Kings	Year inducted	References
Rob Blake	Player	1990–2001, 2006–2008	2015	
Peter Demers	Trainer	1971–2006	1997	
Marcel Dionne	Player	1975–1987	1997	
Butch Goring	Player	1969–1980	1997	
Wayne Gretzky	Player	1988–1996	2002	
Bob Miller	Broadcaster	1973–present	1997	
Luc Robitaille	Player	1986–1994, 1997–2001, 2003–2006	2007	
Dave Taylor	Player, general manager	1977–1994, 1997–2006	1997	
Rogie Vachon	Player, general manager	1971–1978, 1984–1992	1997	

== Team awards ==
=== Ace Bailey Memorial Award ===
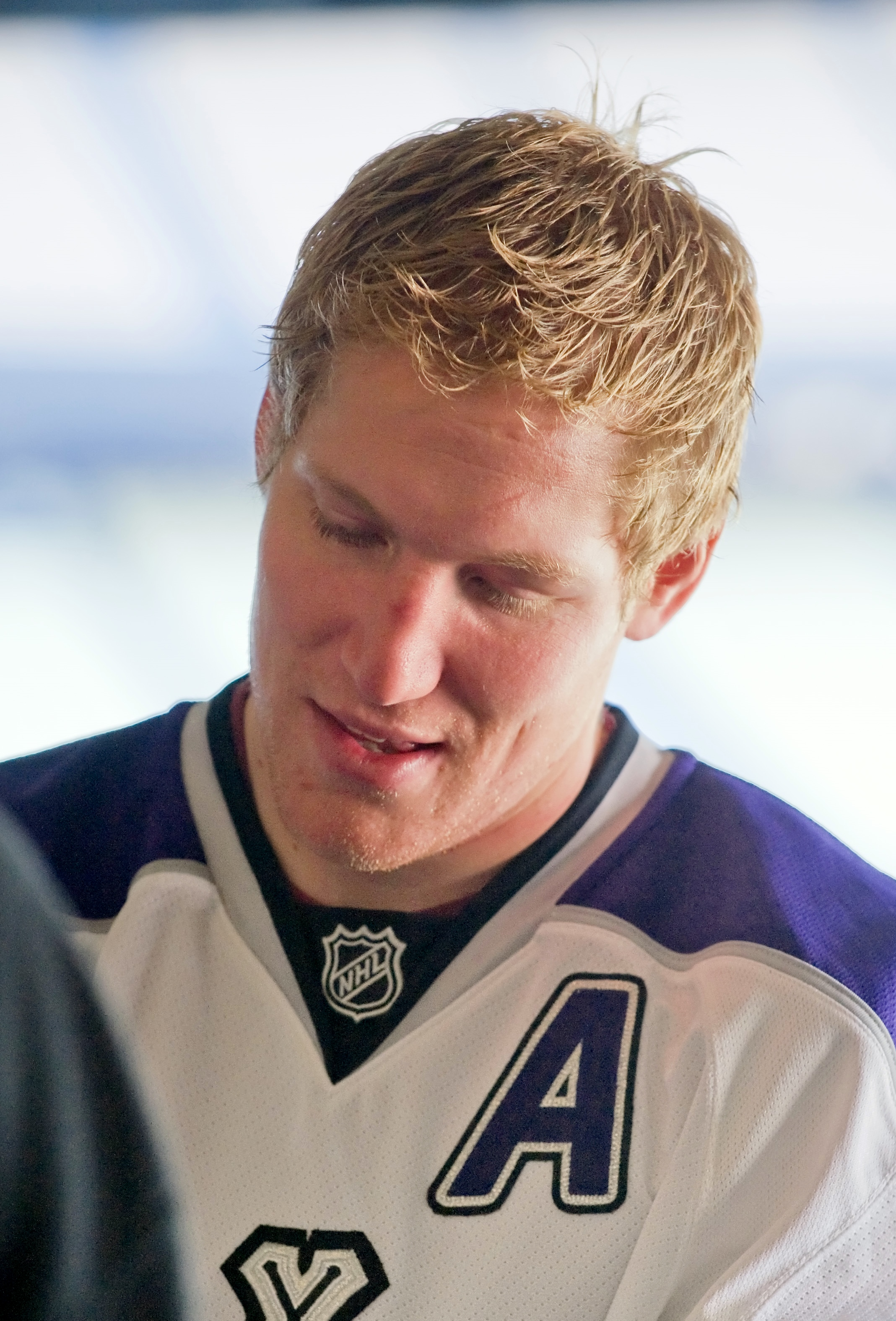
Matt Greene shares the most awards with Dave Taylor.

The Ace Bailey Memorial Award is given annually to the Kings most inspirational player as determined by Kings players. It is named for former Kings Director of Pro Scouting Garnet "Ace" Bailey who died when United Airlines Flight 175 crashed into the World Trade Center in New York City during the September 11 attacks. Dave Taylor and Matt Greene both won the award six times during their Kings career.

Season	Winner
1972–73	Rogie Vachon
1973–74	Terry Harper
1974–75	Bob Nevin
1975–76	Bob Nevin
1976–77	Butch Goring
1977–78	Butch Goring
1978–79	Dave Taylor
1979–80	Charlie Simmer
1980–81	Dave Taylor
1981–82	Dave Taylor
1982–83	Terry Ruskowski
1983–84	Anders Hakansson
1984–85	Dave Taylor
1985–86	Tiger Williams
1986–87	Tiger Williams
1987–88	Dave Taylor

Season	Winner
1988–89	John Tonelli
1989–90	John Tonelli
1990–91	Larry Robinson
1991–92	Tony Granato
1992–93	Dave Taylor
1993–94	Pat Conacher
1994–95	Kelly Hrudey
1995–96	Tony Granato
1996–97	Ian Laperriere
1997–98	Rob Blake
1998–99	Mattias Norstrom
1999–00	Garry Galley
2000–01	Ian Laperriere
2001–02	Zigmund Palffy
2002–03	Ian Laperriere
2003–04	Luc Robitaille

Season	Winner
2005–06	Mattias Norstrom
2006–07	Tom Kostopoulos
2007–08	Dustin Brown
2008–09	Sean O'Donnell
2009–10	Matt Greene
2010–11	Matt Greene
2011–12	Jonathan Quick
2012–13	Matt Greene
2013–14	Matt Greene
2014–15	Matt Greene
2015–16	Vincent Lecavalier
2016–17	Matt Greene
2017–18	Dustin Brown
2018–19	Dustin Brown
2018–19	Kyle Clifford
2019–20	Anze Kopitar

Season	Winner
2020–21	Anze Kopitar
2021–22	Phillip Danault
2022–23	Pheonix Copley
2023–24	Viktor Arvidsson
2024–25	Anze Kopitar
2025–26	Anze Kopitar

=== Bill Libby Memorial Award ===
The Bill Libby Memorial Award is given annually to the Kings player who was the team's most valuable player as determined by the local media. It is named for Bill Libby, a former Los Angeles sportswriter who died on June 16, 1984. Marcel Dionne won the award eight times during his Kings career.

Season	Winner
1967–68	Eddie Joyal
1968–69	Gerry Desjardins
1969–70	Ross Lonsberry
1970–71	Juha Widing
1971–72	Gilles Marotte
1972–73	Rogie Vachon
1973–74	Rogie Vachon
1974–75	Rogie Vachon
1975–76	Marcel Dionne
1976–77	Marcel Dionne
1977–78	Butch Goring
1978–79	Marcel Dionne
1979–80	Marcel Dionne
1980–81	Mario Lessard
1981–82	Marcel Dionne
1981–82	Dave Taylor
1982–83	Marcel Dionne
1983–84	Charlie Simmer

Season	Winner
1984–85	Marcel Dionne
1985–86	Marcel Dionne
1986–87	Roland Melanson
1987–88	Jimmy Carson
1988–89	Wayne Gretzky
1989–90	Wayne Gretzky
1990–91	Wayne Gretzky
1991–92	Kelly Hrudey
1992–93	Luc Robitaille
1993–94	Wayne Gretzky
1994–95	Kelly Hrudey
1995–96	Dmitri Khristich
1996–97	Dmitri Khristich
1997–98	Rob Blake
1998–99	Luc Robitaille
1999–00	Rob Blake
2000–01	Luc Robitaille
2001–02	Jason Allison

Season	Winner
2002–03	Zigmund Palffy
2003–04	Luc Robitaille
2005–06	Lubomir Visnovsky
2006–07	Mike Cammalleri
2007–08	Anze Kopitar
2008–09	Dustin Brown
2009–10	Anze Kopitar
2010–11	Anze Kopitar
2011–12	Jonathan Quick
2012–13	Jeff Carter
2013–14	Anze Kopitar
2014–15	Drew Doughty
2015–16	Anze Kopitar
2016–17	Jeff Carter
2017–18	Anze Kopitar
2018–19	Dustin Brown
2019–20	Anze Kopitar
2020–21	Anze Kopitar

Season	Winner
2021–22	Phillip Danault
2022–23	Anze Kopitar
2023–24	Adrian Kempe
2024–25	Darcy Kuemper
2025–26	Adrian Kempe

=== Jim Fox Community Service ===
The Community Service award is determined by the Kings Care Foundation and given annually to the Kings player who "best exemplifies strong community outreach by actively working with local youth organizations and community groups to increase awareness and raise funds to support the Kings community signature initiatives – education, health-related causes and recreation."

Season	Winner
1988–89	Jim Fox
1989–90	Dave Taylor
1990–91	Dave Taylor
1991–92	Luc Robitaille
1992–93	Tony Granato
1992–93	Marty McSorley
1992–93	Luc Robitaille
1992–93	Dave Taylor
1993–94	Dave Taylor
1994–95	Tony Granato
1995–96	Rob Blake
1995–96	Eric Lacroix
1996–97	Dan Bylsma
1996–97	Byron Dafoe

Season	Winner
1997–98	Luc Robitaille
1998–99	Rob Blake
1998–99	Sean O'Donnell
1999–00	Rob Blake
2000–01	Kelly Buchberger
2000–01	Stu Grimson
2001–02	Jamie Storr
2002–03	Craig Johnson
2002–03	Jamie Storr
2003–04	Ian Laperriere
2005–06	Jeremy Roenick
2006–07	Derek Armstrong
2007–08	Derek Armstrong
2008–09	Dustin Brown

Season	Winner
2009–10	Dustin Brown
2010–11	Dustin Brown
2011–12	Jonathan Bernier
2012–13	Jonathan Quick
2013–14	Jonathan Quick
2014–15	Tyler Toffoli
2015–16	Tyler Toffoli
2016–17	Alec Martinez
2017–18	Drew Doughty
2018–19	Austin Wagner
2019–20	Austin Wagner
2020–21	Not awarded
2021–22	Dustin Brown
2022–23	Kevin Fiala

Season	Winner
2023–24	Kevin Fiala
2024–25	Kevin Fiala
2025–26	Kevin Fiala

=== Daryl Evans Youth Hockey Service ===
The Daryl Evans Youth Hockey Service award is determined by the Kings Hockey Development Department and given annually to the Kings player "determined to continue the club's efforts in growing the game of hockey in our area."

Season	Winner
2014–15	Jarret Stoll
2015–16	Kyle Clifford
2016–17	Tyler Toffoli
2017–18	Tyler Toffoli
2018–19	Tyler Toffoli

Season	Winner
2019–20	Trevor Lewis
2020–21	Not awarded
2021–22	Dustin Brown
2022–23	Quinton Byfield
2023–24	Phillip Danault

Season	Winner
2024–25	Adrian Kempe
2025–26	Jacob Moverare

=== Defensive Player ===
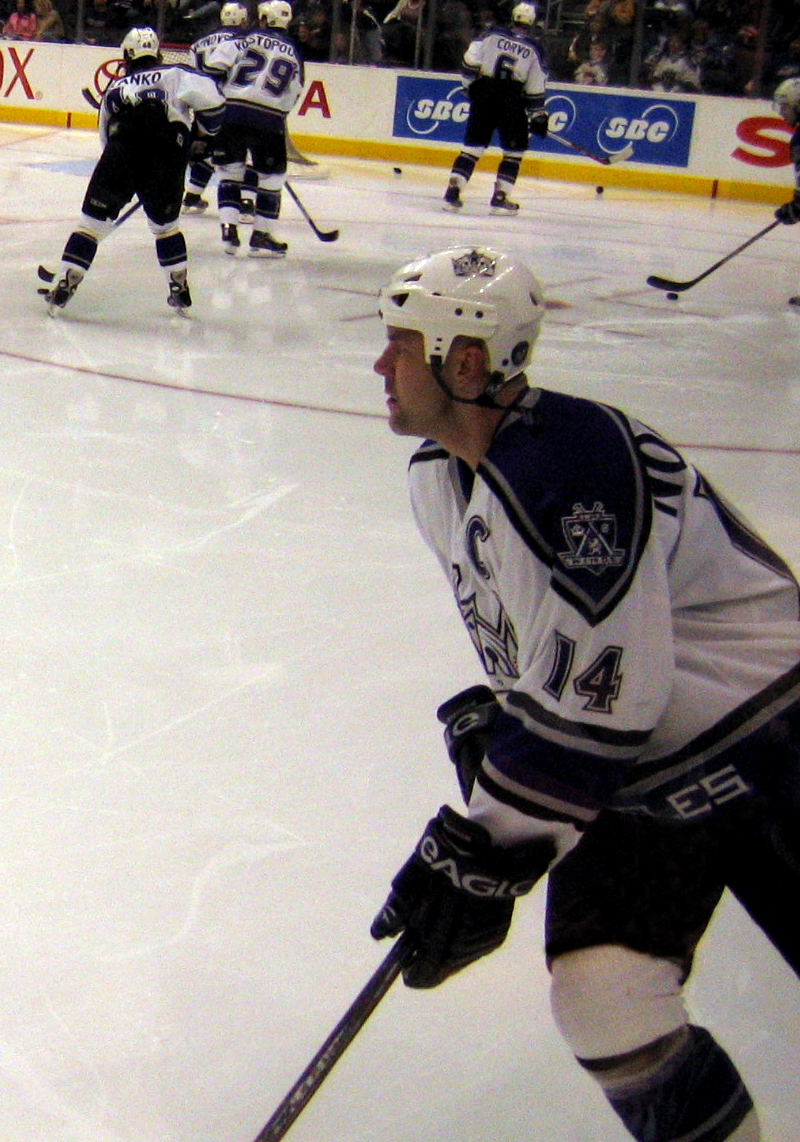
Mattias Norstrom

The Defensive Player award is given annually to the Kings player, regardless of position, who most excels on the defensive end of the ice as determined by the local media. Mattias Norstrom won the award five times during his Kings career.

Season	Winner
1988–89	Tom Laidlaw
1989–90	Steve Kasper
1990–91	Steve Kasper
1991–92	John McIntyre
1992–93	Jari Kurri
1993–94	Jari Kurri
1994–95	Pat Conacher
1995–96	Kevin Todd
1996–97	Ian Laperriere
1997–98	Ian Laperriere
1998–99	Ian Laperriere

Season	Winner
1999–00	Mattias Norstrom
2000–01	Mattias Norstrom
2001–02	Aaron Miller
2002–03	Mattias Norstrom
2003–04	Mattias Norstrom
2005–06	Mattias Norstrom
2006–07	Derek Armstrong
2007–08	Patrick O'Sullivan
2008–09	Michal Handzus
2009–10	Michal Handzus
2010–11	Anze Kopitar

Season	Winner
2011–12	Jonathan Quick
2012–13	Anze Kopitar
2013–14	Anze Kopitar
2014–15	Anze Kopitar
2015–16	Drew Doughty
2015–16	Jonathan Quick
2016–17	Drew Doughty
2017–18	Anze Kopitar
2018–19	Jack Campbell
2019–20	Matt Roy
2020–21	Drew Doughty

Season	Winner
2021–22	Trevor Moore
2022–23	Anze Kopitar
2023–24	Anze Kopitar
2024–25	Darcy Kuemper
2025–26	Anze Kopitar

=== Leading Scorer ===
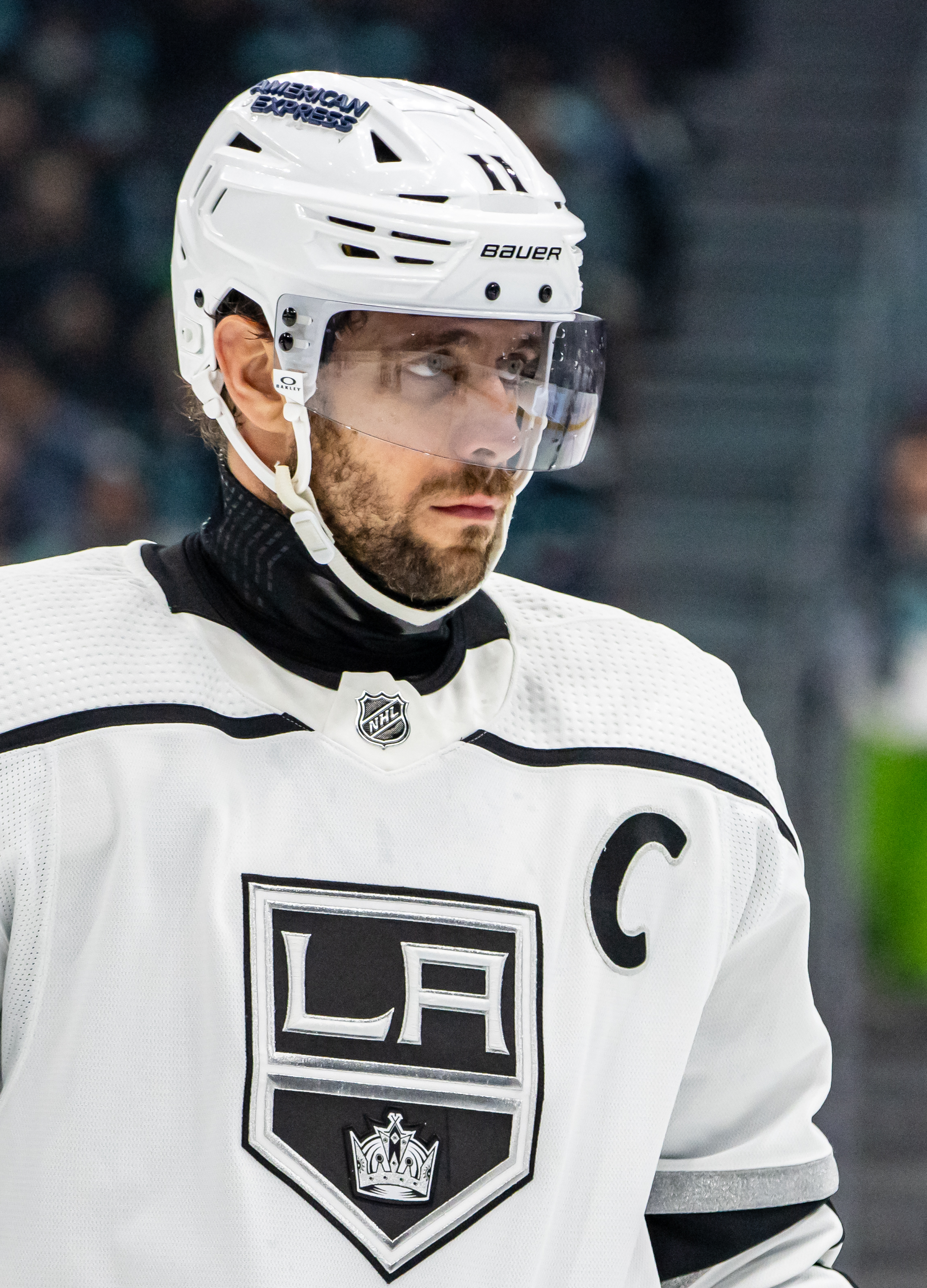
Anze Kopitar has led the team in scoring for the most consecutive seasons.

The Leading Scorer award is given annually to the Kings team leader in points scored. Anze Kopitar has led the team in scoring fifteen times.

Season	Winner
1967–68	Eddie Joyal
1968–69	Eddie Joyal
1969–70	Ross Lonsberry
1970–71	Juha Widing
1971–72	Juha Widing
1972–73	Juha Widing
1973–74	Butch Goring
1974–75	Bob Nevin
1975–76	Marcel Dionne
1976–77	Marcel Dionne
1977–78	Marcel Dionne
1978–79	Marcel Dionne
1979–80	Marcel Dionne
1980–81	Marcel Dionne
1981–82	Marcel Dionne
1982–83	Marcel Dionne
1983–84	Bernie Nicholls

Season	Winner
1984–85	Marcel Dionne
1985–86	Bernie Nicholls
1986–87	Luc Robitaille
1987–88	Luc Robitaille
1988–89	Wayne Gretzky
1989–90	Wayne Gretzky
1990–91	Wayne Gretzky
1991–92	Wayne Gretzky
1992–93	Luc Robitaille
1993–94	Wayne Gretzky
1994–95	Wayne Gretzky
1995–96	Dmitri Khristich
1996–97	Dmitri Khristich
1997–98	Jozef Stumpel
1998–99	Luc Robitaille
1999–00	Luc Robitaille
2000–01	Zigmund Palffy

Season	Winner
2001–02	Jason Allison
2002–03	Zigmund Palffy
2003–04	Luc Robitaille
2005–06	Lubomir Visnovsky
2006–07	Mike Cammalleri
2007–08	Anze Kopitar
2008–09	Anze Kopitar
2009–10	Anze Kopitar
2010–11	Anze Kopitar
2011–12	Anze Kopitar
2012–13	Anze Kopitar
2013–14	Anze Kopitar
2014–15	Anze Kopitar
2015–16	Anze Kopitar
2016–17	Jeff Carter
2017–18	Anze Kopitar
2018–19	Anze Kopitar

Season	Winner
2019–20	Anze Kopitar
2020–21	Anze Kopitar
2021–22	Anze Kopitar
2022–23	Anze Kopitar
2023–24	Adrian Kempe
2024–25	Adrian Kempe
2025–26	Adrian Kempe

=== Mark Bavis Memorial Award ===
The Mark Bavis Memorial Award is given annually to the member of the Kings organization that makes the greatest impact as a newcomer. It is named for former Kings Scout Mark Bavis who died when United Airlines Flight 175 crashed into the World Trade Center in New York City during the September 11 attacks.

Season	Winner
1988–89	Bruce McNall
1989–90	Todd Elik
1990–91	Daniel Berthiaume
1991–92	Corey Millen
1992–93	Darryl Sydor
1992–93	Alexei Zhitnik
1993–94	Robert Lang
1994–95	Rick Tocchet
1995–96	Vitali Yachmenev
1996–97	Stephane Fiset
1997–98	Jozef Stumpel

Season	Winner
1998–99	Donald Audette
1999–00	Zigmund Palffy
2000–01	Lubomir Visnovsky
2001–02	Jason Allison
2002–03	Alexander Frolov
2003–04	Trent Klatt
2005–06	Pavol Demitra
2006–07	Anze Kopitar
2007–08	Jack Johnson
2008–09	Drew Doughty
2009–10	Ryan Smyth

Season	Winner
2010–11	Willie Mitchell
2011–12	Jeff Carter
2012–13	Jake Muzzin
2013–14	Martin Jones
2014–15	Brayden McNabb
2015–16	Milan Lucic
2016–17	Derek Forbort
2017–18	Alex Iafallo
2018–19	Austin Wagner
2019–20	Matt Roy
2020–21	Mikey Anderson

Season	Winner
2021–22	Phillip Danault
2022–23	Kevin Fiala
2023–24	Cam Talbot
2024–25	Warren Foegele
2025–26	Artemi Panarin

=== Most Popular Player ===
The Most Popular Player award is given annually by the Kings Booster Club to the most popular Kings player.

Season	Winner
1968–69	Eddie Joyal
1969–70	Eddie Joyal
1970–71	Gilles Marotte
1971–72	Ralph Backstrom
1972–73	Butch Goring
1973–74	Dan Maloney
1974–75	Butch Goring
1975–76	Butch Goring
1976–77	Rogie Vachon
1977–78	Butch Goring
1978–79	Marcel Dionne
1979–80	Marcel Dionne
1980–81	Charlie Simmer
1981–82	Dave Taylor
1982–83	No vote
1983–84	Bernie Nicholls
1984–85	Marcel Dionne

Season	Winner
1985–86	Marcel Dionne
1986–87	Jimmy Carson
1987–88	Luc Robitaille
1988–89	Wayne Gretzky
1989–90	Marty McSorley
1990–91	Marty McSorley
1991–92	Luc Robitaille
1992–93	Marty McSorley
1993–94	Wayne Gretzky
1994–95	Kelly Hrudey
1995–96	Eric Lacroix
1996–97	Dan Bylsma
1996–97	Ian Laperriere
1997–98	Rob Blake
1998–99	Luc Robitaille
1999–00	Ian Laperriere
2000–01	Ian Laperriere

Season	Winner
2001–02	Adam Deadmarsh
2002–03	Ian Laperriere
2003–04	Alexander Frolov
2005–06	Luc Robitaille
2006–07	Anze Kopitar
2007–08	Dustin Brown
2008–09	Dustin Brown
2009–10	Dustin Brown
2010–11	Anze Kopitar
2011–12	Jonathan Quick
2012–13	Dustin Brown
2013–14	Drew Doughty
2014–15	Jonathan Quick
2015–16	Jonathan Quick
2016–17	Jeff Carter
2017–18	Jonathan Quick
2018–19	Dustin Brown

Season	Winner
2019–20	Blake Lizotte
2020–21	Anze Kopitar
2021–22	Phillip Danault
2022–23	Adrian Kempe
2023–24	Kevin Fiala
2024–25	Quinton Byfield
2025–26	Andrei Kuzmenko

=== Outstanding Defenseman ===
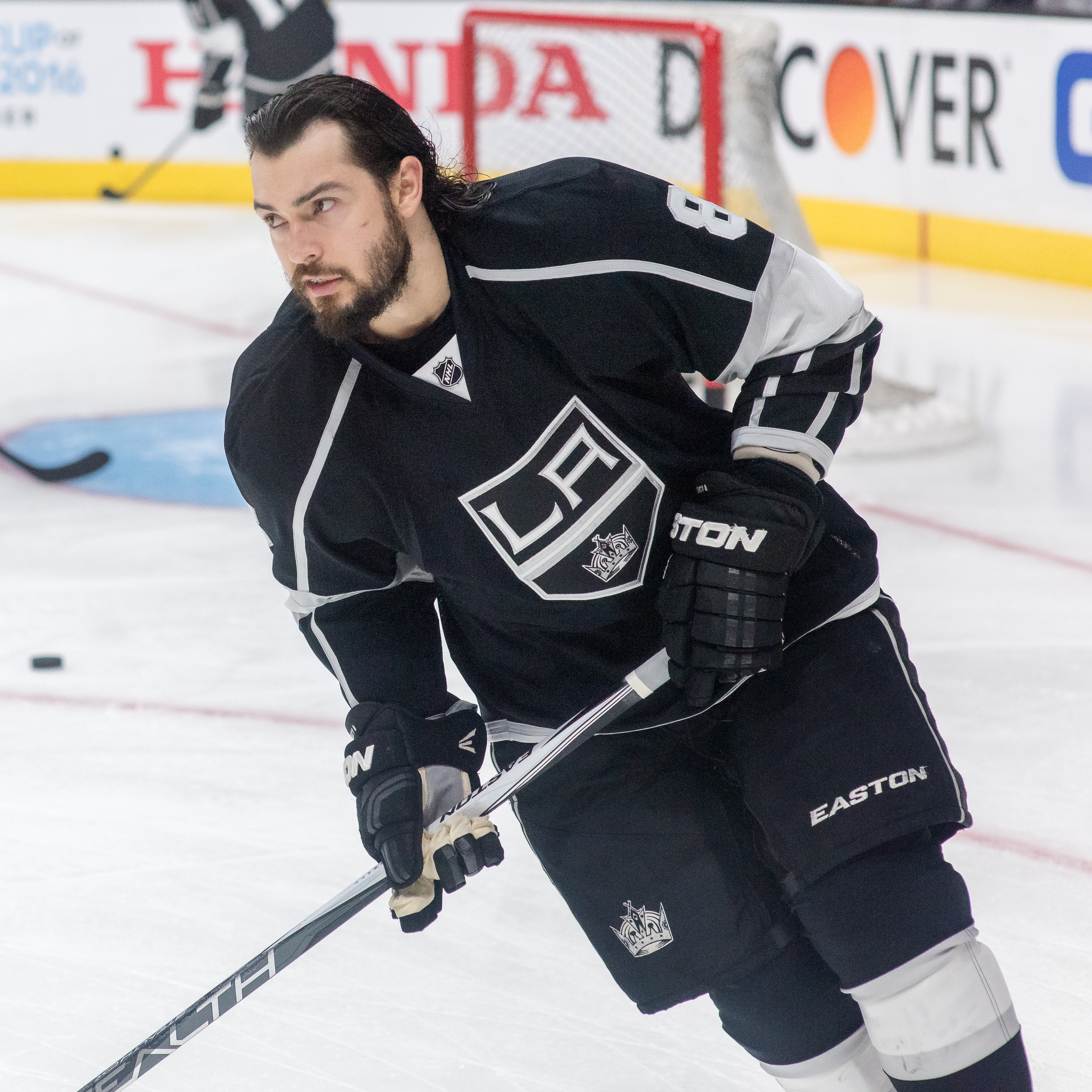
Drew Doughty

The Outstanding Defenseman award is given annually to the Kings most outstanding defenseman as determined by the local media. Drew Doughty has the most wins with 13.

Season	Winner
1976–77	Gary Sargent
1977–78	Randy Manery
1978–79	Randy Manery
1979–80	Doug Halward
1980–81	Dave Lewis
1981–82	Larry Murphy
1982–83	Jay Wells
1983–84	Jay Wells
1984–85	Mark Hardy
1985–86	Jay Wells
1986–87	Mark Hardy
1987–88	Tom Laidlaw
1988–89	Steve Duchesne
1989–90	Tim Watters

Season	Winner
1990–91	Rob Blake
1991–92	Rob Blake
1992–93	Rob Blake
1993–94	Rob Blake
1994–95	Darryl Sydor
1995–96	Steven Finn
1996–97	Mattias Norstrom
1997–98	Rob Blake
1998–99	Mattias Norstrom
1999–00	Rob Blake
2000–01	Mattias Norstrom
2001–02	Aaron Miller
2002–03	Mattias Norstrom
2003–04	Lubomir Visnovsky

Season	Winner
2005–06	Lubomir Visnovsky
2006–07	Lubomir Visnovsky
2007–08	Jack Johnson
2008–09	Drew Doughty
2009–10	Drew Doughty
2010–11	Drew Doughty
2011–12	Willie Mitchell
2012–13	Drew Doughty
2013–14	Drew Doughty
2014–15	Drew Doughty
2015–16	Drew Doughty
2016–17	Drew Doughty
2017–18	Drew Doughty
2018–19	Drew Doughty

Season	Winner
2019–20	Matt Roy
2020–21	Drew Doughty
2021–22	Matt Roy
2022–23	Drew Doughty
2023–24	Drew Doughty
2024–25	Vladislav Gavrikov
2025–26	Brandt Clarke

=== Unsung Hero ===
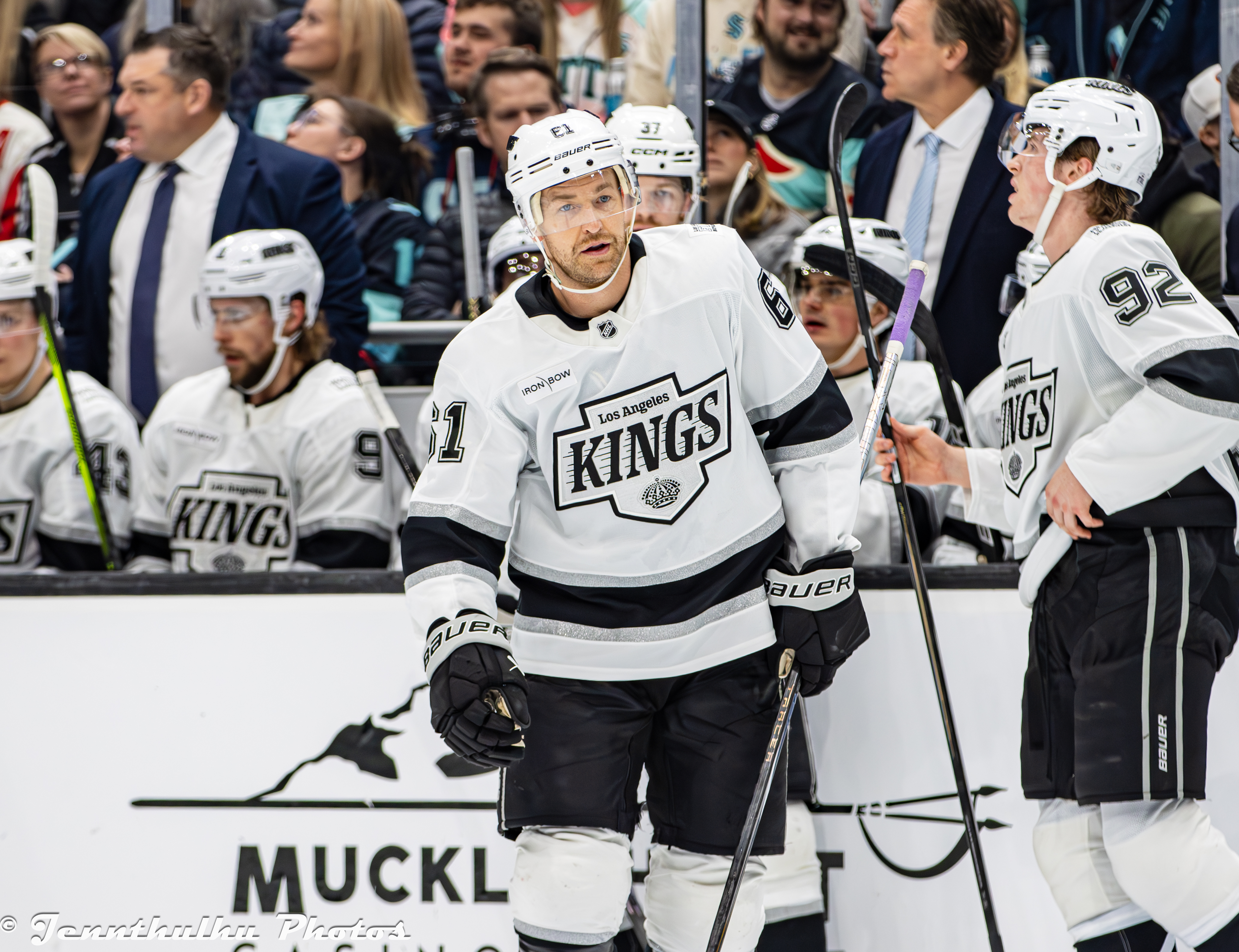
Trevor Lewis

The Unsung Hero award is given annually to the Kings player who contributed the most to the team without receiving proper recognition for his contributions as determined by Kings players. Trevor Lewis has won the awards 7 times.

Season	Winner
1968–69	Brent Hughes
1969–70	Jimmy Peters Jr.
1970–71	Paul Curtis
1971–72	Norm Mackie (trainer)
1972–73	Larry Brown
1973–74	Frank St. Marseille
1974–75	Gary Edwards
1975–76	Neil Komadoski
1976–77	Mike Murphy
1977–78	Pete Stemkowski
1978–79	Rob Palmer
1979–80	Mike Murphy
1980–81	Larry Murphy
1981–82	John-Paul Kelly
1982–83	John-Paul Kelly
1983–84	Anders Hakansson
1984–85	Phil Sykes
1985–86	Bryan Erickson
1985–86	Phil Sykes

Season	Winner
1986–87	Roland Melanson
1987–88	Tom Laidlaw
1988–89	Tim Watters
1989–90	Dave Taylor
1990–91	Dave Taylor
1991–92	Charlie Huddy
1992–93	Pat Conacher
1993–94	Kelly Hrudey
1994–95	Pat Conacher
1995–96	Steven Finn
1996–97	Byron Dafoe
1997–98	Mattias Norstrom
1998–99	Mattias Norstrom
1999–00	Mattias Norstrom
2000–01	Jaroslav Modry
2001–02	Aaron Miller
2002–03	Derek Armstrong
2003–04	Trent Klatt
2005–06	Craig Conroy

Season	Winner
2006–07	Tom Kostopoulos
2007–08	Jeff Giuliano
2008–09	Michal Handzus
2009–10	Michal Handzus
2010–11	Matt Greene
2011–12	Trevor Lewis
2011–12	Rob Scuderi
2012–13	Trevor Lewis
2013–14	Trevor Lewis
2014–15	Trevor Lewis
2014–15	Tyler Toffoli
2015–16	Trevor Lewis
2016–17	Trevor Lewis
2017–18	Trevor Lewis
2018–19	Jack Campbell
2019–20	Matt Roy
2020–21	Trevor Moore
2021–22	Blake Lizotte
2022–23	Matt Roy

Season	Winner
2023–24	Blake Lizotte
2024–25	Warren Foegele
2025–26	Anton Forsberg

== Other awards ==
Los Angeles Kings who have received non-NHL awards
Award	Description	Winner	Season	References
Best NHL Player ESPY Award	Best NHL player of the last calendar year	Jonathan Quick	2012	
Charlie Conacher Humanitarian Award	For humanitarian or community service projects	Jimmy Peters Jr.	1972–73	
Lionel Conacher Award	Canada's male athlete of the year	Wayne Gretzky	1989	
Lou Marsh Trophy	Canada's top athlete	Wayne Gretzky	1989	
Viking Award	Most valuable Swedish player in NHL	Tomas Sandstrom	1990–91	

== See also ==
- List of National Hockey League awards

== Notes ==
^1Shared with Theoren Fleury of the Calgary Flames.
