= 1996–97 Los Angeles Kings season =

National Hockey League team season

1996–97 Los Angeles Kings
- Division: 6th Pacific
- Conference: 12th Western
- 1996–97 record: 28–43–11
- Home record: 18–16–7
- Road record: 10–27–4
- Goals for: 214
- Goals against: 268

Team information
- General manager: Sam McMaster
- Coach: Larry Robinson
- Captain: Rob Blake
- Alternate captains: Kevin Stevens; Ed Olczyk
- Arena: Great Western Forum
- Average attendance: 12,297
- Minor league affiliates: Phoenix Roadrunners; Knoxville Cherokees; Mississippi Sea Wolves

Team leaders
- Goals: Ray Ferraro (25)
- Assists: Dmitri Khristich (37)
- Points: Dmitri Khristich (56)
- Penalty minutes: Matt Johnson (194)
- Plus/minus: Dmitri Khristich (+8); Vladimir Tsyplakov (+8)
- Wins: Byron Dafoe (13); Stephane Fiset (13)
- Goals against average: Byron Dafoe (3.11)

The 1996–97 Los Angeles Kings season, was the Kings' 30th season in the National Hockey League (NHL). The Kings missed the playoffs for the fourth consecutive year.

== Offseason ==
Defenseman Rob Blake was named team captain.

== Regular season ==
=== Final standings ===
Pacific Division
No.	CR		GP	W	L	T	GF	GA	Pts
1	1	**Colorado Avalanche**	82	49	24	9	277	205	107
2	4	**Mighty Ducks of Anaheim**	82	36	33	13	243	231	85
3	7	**Edmonton Oilers**	82	36	37	9	252	247	81
4	9	Vancouver Canucks	82	35	40	7	257	273	77
5	10	Calgary Flames	82	32	41	9	214	239	73
6	12	Los Angeles Kings	82	28	43	11	214	268	67
7	13	San Jose Sharks	82	27	47	8	211	278	62

Note: CR = Conference rank; GP = Games played; W = Wins; L = Losses; T = Ties; GF = Goals for; GA = Goals against; Pts = Points
Bolded teams qualified for the playoffs.

Western Conference
R		Div	GP	W	L	T	GF	GA	Pts
**1**	**p – Colorado Avalanche**	**PAC**	**82**	**49**	**24**	**9**	**277**	**205**	**107**
**2**	**Dallas Stars**	**CEN**	**82**	**48**	**26**	**8**	**252**	**198**	**104**
**3**	**Detroit Red Wings**	**CEN**	**82**	**38**	**26**	**18**	**253**	**197**	**94**
**4**	**Mighty Ducks of Anaheim**	**PAC**	**82**	**36**	**33**	**13**	**245**	**233**	**85**
**5**	**Phoenix Coyotes**	**CEN**	**82**	**38**	**37**	**7**	**240**	**243**	**83**
**6**	**St. Louis Blues**	**CEN**	**82**	**36**	**35**	**11**	**236**	**239**	**83**
**7**	**Edmonton Oilers**	**PAC**	**82**	**36**	**37**	**9**	**252**	**247**	**81**
**8**	**Chicago Blackhawks**	**CEN**	**82**	**34**	**35**	**13**	**223**	**210**	**81**
9	Vancouver Canucks	PAC	82	35	40	7	257	273	77
10	Calgary Flames	PAC	82	32	41	9	214	239	73
11	Toronto Maple Leafs	CEN	82	30	44	8	230	273	68
12	Los Angeles Kings	PAC	82	28	43	11	214	268	67
13	San Jose Sharks	PAC	82	27	47	8	211	278	62

Divisions: CEN – Central, PAC – Pacific

bold – Qualified for playoffs; p – Won Presidents' Trophy

== Schedule and results ==
1996–97 regular season
October: 5–6–2 (home: 3–2–1; road: 2–4–1)

Game	Date	Score	Opponent	Record	Recap
1	October 4, 1996	1–0	New York Islanders (1996–97)	1–0–0	W
2	October 6, 1996	6–7 OT	San Jose Sharks (1996–97)	1–1–0	L
3	October 9, 1996	3–6	@ Montreal Canadiens (1996–97)	1–2–0	L
4	October 10, 1996	4–5 OT	@ Philadelphia Flyers (1996–97)	1–3–0	L
5	October 12, 1996	4–3	@ Washington Capitals (1996–97)	2–3–0	W
6	October 15, 1996	3–2	Philadelphia Flyers (1996–97)	3–3–0	W
7	October 17, 1996	4–2	Boston Bruins (1996–97)	4–3–0	W
8	October 20, 1996	1–2	@ Chicago Blackhawks (1996–97)	4–4–0	L
9	October 21, 1996	0–3	@ Detroit Red Wings (1996–97)	4–5–0	L
10	October 24, 1996	2–8	Edmonton Oilers (1996–97)	4–6–0	L
11	October 26, 1996	0–0 OT	Calgary Flames (1996–97)	4–6–1	T
12	October 29, 1996	5–2	@ Toronto Maple Leafs (1996–97)	5–6–1	W
13	October 30, 1996	2–2 OT	@ Ottawa Senators (1996–97)	5–6–2	T

November: 5–6–1 (home: 2–2–0; road: 3–4–1)

Game	Date	Score	Opponent	Record	Recap
14	November 2, 1996	3–2	@ Hartford Whalers (1996–97)	6–6–2	W
15	November 4, 1996	4–4 OT	@ Boston Bruins (1996–97)	6–6–3	T
16	November 7, 1996	4–1	Montreal Canadiens (1996–97)	7–6–3	W
17	November 8, 1996	4–7	@ Mighty Ducks of Anaheim (1996–97)	7–7–3	L
18	November 14, 1996	4–1	Toronto Maple Leafs (1996–97)	8–7–3	W
19	November 17, 1996	4–2	@ Chicago Blackhawks (1996–97)	9–7–3	W
20	November 19, 1996	0–3	@ Tampa Bay Lightning (1996–97)	9–8–3	L
21	November 20, 1996	1–4	@ Florida Panthers (1996–97)	9–9–3	L
22	November 23, 1996	0–6	Detroit Red Wings (1996–97)	9–10–3	L
23	November 27, 1996	5–1	@ Edmonton Oilers (1996–97)	10–10–3	W
24	November 28, 1996	0–2	@ Calgary Flames (1996–97)	10–11–3	L
25	November 30, 1996	3–5	Chicago Blackhawks (1996–97)	10–12–3	L

December: 3–9–1 (home: 2–4–1; road: 1–5–0)

Game	Date	Score	Opponent	Record	Recap
26	December 3, 1996	4–1	@ Phoenix Coyotes (1996–97)	11–12–3	W
27	December 5, 1996	1–2	Tampa Bay Lightning (1996–97)	11–13–3	L
28	December 7, 1996	4–2	Colorado Avalanche (1996–97)	12–13–3	W
29	December 10, 1996	3–5	Pittsburgh Penguins (1996–97)	12–14–3	L
30	December 12, 1996	1–5	Calgary Flames (1996–97)	12–15–3	L
31	December 14, 1996	4–4 OT	Washington Capitals (1996–97)	12–15–4	T
32	December 17, 1996	3–4	@ New York Islanders (1996–97)	12–16–4	L
33	December 18, 1996	0–4	@ New York Rangers (1996–97)	12–17–4	L
34	December 20, 1996	2–6	@ Buffalo Sabres (1996–97)	12–18–4	L
35	December 22, 1996	4–7	@ St. Louis Blues (1996–97)	12–19–4	L
36	December 26, 1996	5–2	Phoenix Coyotes (1996–97)	13–19–4	W
37	December 28, 1996	2–5	Colorado Avalanche (1996–97)	13–20–4	L
38	December 30, 1996	1–2	@ Edmonton Oilers (1996–97)	13–21–4	L

January: 5–6–2 (home: 4–2–1; road: 1–4–1)

Game	Date	Score	Opponent	Record	Recap
39	January 2, 1997	3–4	@ Vancouver Canucks (1996–97)	13–22–4	L
40	January 4, 1997	0–5	Florida Panthers (1996–97)	13–23–4	L
41	January 7, 1997	6–2	Vancouver Canucks (1996–97)	14–23–4	W
42	January 9, 1997	6–3	Buffalo Sabres (1996–97)	15–23–4	W
43	January 11, 1997	2–1	St. Louis Blues (1996–97)	16–23–4	W
44	January 14, 1997	3–3 OT	@ Detroit Red Wings (1996–97)	16–23–5	T
45	January 15, 1997	3–2	@ Toronto Maple Leafs (1996–97)	17–23–5	W
46	January 21, 1997	1–4	New Jersey Devils (1996–97)	17–24–5	L
47	January 22, 1997	2–7	@ San Jose Sharks (1996–97)	17–25–5	L
48	January 25, 1997	2–2 OT	Mighty Ducks of Anaheim (1996–97)	17–25–6	T
49	January 27, 1997	2–7	@ Dallas Stars (1996–97)	17–26–6	L
50	January 29, 1997	3–6	@ Colorado Avalanche (1996–97)	17–27–6	L
51	January 30, 1997	5–3	Hartford Whalers (1996–97)	18–27–6	W

February: 5–6–2 (home: 4–2–2; road: 1–4–0)

Game	Date	Score	Opponent	Record	Recap
52	February 1, 1997	2–3	Chicago Blackhawks (1996–97)	18–28–6	L
53	February 3, 1997	3–2	@ Calgary Flames (1996–97)	19–28–6	W
54	February 5, 1997	2–3	@ San Jose Sharks (1996–97)	19–29–6	L
55	February 9, 1997	1–2 OT	@ Dallas Stars (1996–97)	19–30–6	L
56	February 11, 1997	1–3	@ Colorado Avalanche (1996–97)	19–31–6	L
57	February 13, 1997	4–4 OT	Toronto Maple Leafs (1996–97)	19–31–7	T
58	February 15, 1997	2–2 OT	Edmonton Oilers (1996–97)	19–31–8	T
59	February 17, 1997	1–2	Dallas Stars (1996–97)	19–32–8	L
60	February 18, 1997	1–6	@ Phoenix Coyotes (1996–97)	19–33–8	L
61	February 20, 1997	3–1	Mighty Ducks of Anaheim (1996–97)	20–33–8	W
62	February 22, 1997	4–0	Vancouver Canucks (1996–97)	21–33–8	W
63	February 25, 1997	3–1	Colorado Avalanche (1996–97)	22–33–8	W
64	February 27, 1997	6–3	Edmonton Oilers (1996–97)	23–33–8	W

March: 3–8–2 (home: 2–3–1; road: 1–5–1)

Game	Date	Score	Opponent	Record	Recap
65	March 1, 1997	3–0	@ Vancouver Canucks (1996–97)	24–33–8	W
66	March 4, 1997	1–4	@ Edmonton Oilers (1996–97)	24–34–8	L
67	March 6, 1997	2–6	New York Rangers (1996–97)	24–35–8	L
68	March 8, 1997	3–1	Ottawa Senators (1996–97)	25–35–8	W
69	March 10, 1997	3–3 OT	Detroit Red Wings (1996–97)	25–35–9	T
70	March 13, 1997	2–4	St. Louis Blues (1996–97)	25–36–9	L
71	March 15, 1997	2–5	Calgary Flames (1996–97)	25–37–9	L
72	March 19, 1997	2–6	@ Mighty Ducks of Anaheim (1996–97)	25–38–9	L
73	March 22, 1997	2–1	San Jose Sharks (1996–97)	26–38–9	W
74	March 24, 1997	2–2 OT	@ Vancouver Canucks (1996–97)	26–38–10	T
75	March 27, 1997	1–2	@ St. Louis Blues (1996–97)	26–39–10	L
76	March 29, 1997	1–4	@ Pittsburgh Penguins (1996–97)	26–40–10	L
77	March 30, 1997	2–5	@ New Jersey Devils (1996–97)	26–41–10	L

April: 2–2–1 (home: 1–1–1; road: 1–1–0)

Game	Date	Score	Opponent	Record	Recap
78	April 3, 1997	4–5	Phoenix Coyotes (1996–97)	26–42–10	L
79	April 5, 1997	3–3 OT	Dallas Stars (1996–97)	26–42–11	T
80	April 9, 1997	1–4	@ Mighty Ducks of Anaheim (1996–97)	26–43–11	L
81	April 12, 1997	4–1	San Jose Sharks (1996–97)	27–43–11	W
82	April 13, 1997	4–2	@ Colorado Avalanche (1996–97)	28–43–11	W

Legend: W Win (2 points) L Loss (0 points) T Tie (1 point)

== Player statistics ==
=== Scoring ===
- Position abbreviations: C = Center; D = Defense; G = Goaltender; LW = Left wing; RW = Right wing
- † = Joined team via a transaction (e.g., trade, waivers, signing) during the season. Stats reflect time with the Kings only.
- ‡ = Left team via a transaction (e.g., trade, waivers, release) during the season. Stats reflect time with the Kings only.

No.	Player	Pos	Regular season					
No.	Player	Pos	GP	G	A	Pts	+/-	PIM
8	Dmitri Khristich	C	75	19	37	56	8	38
20	Ray Ferraro	C	81	25	21	46	−22	112
7	Eddie Olczyk‡	RW	67	21	23	44	−22	45
9	Vladimir Tsyplakov	LW	67	16	23	39	8	12
25	Kevin Stevens	LW	69	14	20	34	−27	96
43	Vitali Yachmenev	LW	65	10	22	32	−9	10
4	Rob Blake	D	62	8	23	31	−28	82
21	Kai Nurminen	RW	67	16	11	27	−3	22
44	Yanic Perreault	C	41	11	14	25	0	20
28	Philippe Boucher	D	60	7	18	25	0	25
22	Ian Laperriere	C	62	8	15	23	−25	102
14	Mattias Norstrom	D	80	1	21	22	−4	84
6	Sean O'Donnell	D	55	5	12	17	−13	144
11	Brad Smyth†	RW	44	8	8	16	−7	74
27	John Slaney	D	32	3	11	14	−10	4
19	Jeff Shevalier	LW	26	4	9	13	−6	6
33	Jan Vopat	D	33	4	5	9	3	22
12	Roman Vopat	C	29	4	5	9	−7	60
42	Dan Bylsma	RW	79	3	6	9	−15	32
27	Glen Murray†	RW	11	5	3	8	−2	8
5	Aki Berg	D	41	2	6	8	−9	24
23	Craig Johnson	LW	31	4	3	7	−7	26
41	Brent Grieve	LW	18	4	2	6	−2	15
15	Jaroslav Modry	D	30	3	3	6	−13	25
40	Barry Potomski	LW	26	3	2	5	−8	93
29	Steven Finn	D	54	2	3	5	−8	84
17	Matt Johnson	LW	52	1	3	4	−4	194
24	Nathan LaFayette	C	15	1	3	4	−8	8
10	Neal Broten†‡	C	19	0	4	4	−9	0
85	Petr Klima‡	RW	8	0	4	4	−7	2
37	Paul DiPietro	C	6	1	0	1	−2	6
2	Doug Zmolek	D	57	1	0	1	−22	116
32	Jean-Claude Bergeron	G	1	0	0	0		0
34	Byron Dafoe	G	40	0	0	0		0
35	Stephane Fiset	G	44	0	0	0		2
26	Chris Marinucci†	C	1	0	0	0	−2	0
7	Steve McKenna	LW	9	0	0	0	1	37
52	Jason Morgan	C	3	0	0	0	−3	0
1	Jamie Storr	G	5	0	0	0		0

=== Goaltending ===
No.	Player	Regular season									
No.	Player	GP	W	L	T	SA	GA	GAA	SV%	SO	TOI
34	Byron Dafoe	40	13	17	5	1178	112	3.11	.905	0	2162
35	Stephane Fiset	44	13	24	5	1410	132	3.19	.906	4	2482
1	Jamie Storr	5	2	1	1	147	11	2.49	.925	0	265
32	Jean-Claude Bergeron	1	0	1	0	35	4	4.30	.886	0	56

== Awards and records ==
=== Awards ===
Type	Award/honor	Recipient	Ref
League (in-season)	NHL All-Star Game selection	Rob Blake (Note: Blake did not play and was replaced by Khristich.)	
League (in-season)	NHL All-Star Game selection	Dmitri Khristich	
Team	Best Newcomer	Stephane Fiset	
Team	Bill Libby Memorial Award	Dmitri Khristich	
Team	Defensive Player	Ian Laperriere	
Team	Jim Fox Community Service	Dan Bylsma	
Team	Jim Fox Community Service	Byron Dafoe	
Team	Leading Scorer	Dmitri Khristich	
Team	Most Inspirational	Ian Laperriere	
Team	Most Popular Player	Dan Bylsma	
Team	Most Popular Player	Ian Laperriere	
Team	Outstanding Defenseman	Mattias Norstrom	
Team	Unsung Hero	Byron Dafoe	

=== Milestones ===
Milestone	Player	Date	Ref
First game	Kai Nurminen	October 4, 1996	
First game	Steve McKenna	March 24, 1997	
First game	Jason Morgan	April 9, 1997	

== Transactions ==
The Kings were involved in the following transactions during the 1996–97 season.

=== Trades ===
June 20, 1996	To Los Angeles Kings Stephane Fiset; 1st round pick in 1998	To Colorado Avalanche Eric Lacroix; 1st round pick in 1998
August 22, 1996	To Los Angeles Kings Petr Klima	To Tampa Bay Lightning 5th round pick in 1997
October 25, 1996	To Los Angeles Kings Future considerations	To Pittsburgh Penguins Petr Klima
November 19, 1996	To Los Angeles Kings Chris Marinucci	To New York Islanders Nicholas Vachon
November 22, 1996	To Los Angeles Kings Neal Broten	To New Jersey Devils Future considerations
November 28, 1996	To Los Angeles Kings Brad Smyth	To Florida Panthers 3rd round pick in 1997
March 18, 1997	To Los Angeles Kings Glen Murray	To Pittsburgh Penguins Eddie Olczyk

=== Free agent signings ===
May 23, 1996	From Merrimack College (HE) Steve McKenna
July 8, 1996	From Winnipeg Jets Eddie Olczyk (2 years, $2.15 million)
July 23, 1996	From Toronto Maple Leafs Paul DiPietro (1 year, $325,000)
August 2, 1996	From Chicago Blackhawks Brent Grieve (1 year, $325,000)
August 28, 1996	From Tampa Bay Lightning Jean-Claude Bergeron (1 year, $300,000)
September 6, 1996	From Buffalo Sabres Mark Astley (1 year, $350,000)
December 13, 1996	From Boston Bruins Rick Zombo (1 year, $724,500)

=== Free agents lost ===
July 10, 1996	To Anaheim Mighty Ducks Kevin Todd (2 years, $1.2 million)
July 24, 1996	To Florida Panthers Craig Ferguson (1 year, $350,000)
August 15, 1996	To San Jose Sharks Tony Granato (3 years, $4.5 million)
September 14, 1996	To Houston Aeros (IHL) Gary Shuchuk
October 4, 1996	To Vancouver Canucks Troy Crowder (1 year, $500,000)

=== Waivers ===
January 28, 1997	To Dallas Stars Neal Broten

== Draft picks ==
Los Angeles's draft picks at the 1996 NHL entry draft held at the Kiel Center in St. Louis, Missouri.

Round	#	Player	Nationality	College/Junior/Club team (League)
2	30	Josh Green	Canada	Medicine Hat Tigers (WHL)
2	37	Marian Cisar	Czech Republic	Slovan Bratislava (Slovakia)
3	57	Greg Phillips	Canada	Saskatoon Blades (WHL)
4	84	Mikael Simons	Sweden	Mora IK (Sweden)
4	96	Eric Belanger	Canada	Beauport Harfangs (QMJHL)
5	120	Jesse Black	Canada	Niagara Falls Thunder (OHL)
5	123	Peter Hogan	Canada	Oshawa Generals (OHL)
8	190	Steve Valiquette	Canada	Sudbury Wolves (OHL)
8	193	Kai Nurminen	Finland	HV71 (Sweden)
9	219	Sebastien Simard	Canada	Drummondville Voltigeurs (QMJHL)

== See also ==
- 1996–97 NHL season
