= Pete Demers =

American athletic trainer

Peter Gilmore Demers (born November 4, 1943) is a retired head athletic trainer for the Los Angeles Kings of the National Hockey League. He is a member of the Professional Hockey Athletic Trainers Society Hall of Fame (2007) and a Hockey Hall of Fame honoree (2007). He successfully advocated for improvements to the trainers' and equipment managers’ benefit packages that took effect in 2006.

He was inducted into the U.S. Hockey Hall of Fame in 2016 and the Los Angeles Kings Hall of Fame in 1997.

He served for three terms as president of the Professional Hockey Athletic Trainers Society (1994–2000) after serving on the board for 20 years. He worked with Olympic athletes and international hockey teams. He retired in 2006 after 2,632 consecutive regular-season NHL games as the team athletic trainer. He has two children, Aimee Demers and Thomas Demers.

== Biography ==
=== A life in hockey ===
Demers was born on November 4, 1943, in Providence, Rhode Island. His parents were Kathleen and Arthur Demers. He grew up near the Rhode Island Auditorium, and became a “rink rat,” earning time on the ice in exchange for cleaning the ice and sweeping the stands. At 12 years old, he became an assistant stick boy for the visiting team at Rhode Island Reds of the American Hockey League. A Vietnam-era veteran, Demers served in 1961–1965, then enrolled at Brown University and the University of Rhode Island to study athletic training and sports medicine. In 1970, he received a certification from the National Athletic Trainers Association.

After three seasons with the Rhode Island Reds (1965–1968), Demers worked as the head athletic trainer with the Columbus Checkers (International Hockey League) for one season before joining the Springfield Kings (1969–1972) as head athletic trainer. The Springfield Kings was a Los Angeles Kings farm team.

=== Los Angeles Kings (1972–2006) ===
In 1972, Demers was appointed head athletic trainer to the Los Angeles Kings. The Kings played at the Forum in Inglewood, California (1967–1999). Demers was a first responder with one assistant who treated injuries, planned players’ off-ice and off-season conditioning programs, did massage therapy, physical therapy, and attended to the team's nutrition needs. He also handled equipment

Demers tended to players’ injuries of all kinds with the Kings, including torn ligaments and muscles, broken bones, concussions, cuts, and bruises. The treatments included traditional ice and ultrasound, along with TENS (transcutaneous electronic stimulation).

In 1988, one of hockey's greatest players joined the Kings, making the team hugely popular. Demers was present when Wayne Gretzky held his first press conference, and considers himself “very lucky to see him play.”

With time, teams focused more on protecting players, and Demers was part of that transition. Over the years, he kept a journal of injuries and illness that allowed him to identify key issues. Demers was the athletic trainers’ liaison to the NHL team physician and on the first NHL injury analysis panel designed to record all hockey injuries.

Demers retired in 2007. He holds the record for the most consecutive games as a hockey athletic trainer - 2,632.

"The camaraderie and sense of family that we have in our game is like no other business," he has said.

== Noteworthy games and tournaments ==
=== Olympics ===
In 1998, he was with Team USA at the XVIII Olympic Winter Games in Nagano, Japan. In 1984, he served as the U.S. Olympic Committee trainer-coordinator for basketball, serving teams from all over the world, and attending 63 games in 10 days.

=== National and international competitions ===
Demers served as trainer during several International Ice Hockey Federation World (IIHF) World Championships

- 1997 (Finland)
- 1996 (Austria)
- 1994 (Italy)
- 1986 (Moscow)

He served as trainer during several National Hockey League All-Star games

- 2002 (L.A.)
- 1993 (Montreal)
- 1981 (L.A.)
- 1977 (Vancouver)

He served as athletic trainer for the U.S. Championship team at the World Cup of Hockey Champions (1996). He was also the athletic trainer for the American Hockey League Calder Cup Champion Springfield Kings (1971).

== Honors, awards, and achievements ==
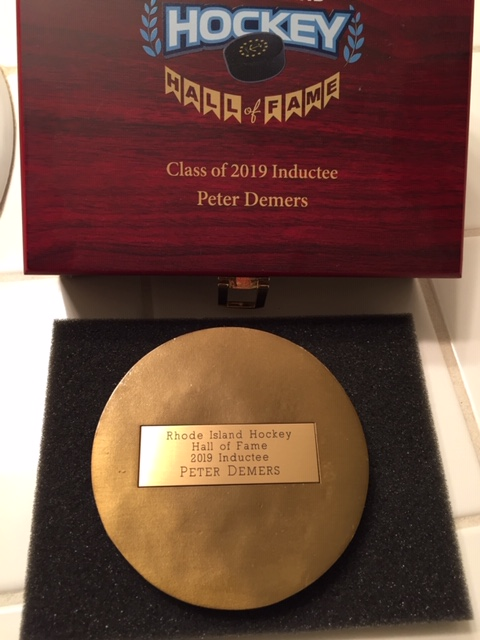
Rhode Island Hockey Hall of Fame induction award, 2019

Demers was inducted into the U.S. Hockey Hall of Fame (2016). He has a ring from the Stanley Cup Championship (2012). He was inducted into the Los Angeles Kings Hall of Fame (1997).

In 2007, Demers was recognized as an honoree in the Hockey Hall of Fame in the trainers category. In 2007, he was also inducted into the Professional Hockey Athletic Trainers Society Hall of Fame.

After serving as president of the Professional Hockey Athletic Trainers Society for three terms, and on the executive board for 20 years, in 2006 the improved trainer benefits he worked for was approved.

He was inducted into the Rhode Island Hockey Hall of Fame in 2019.
