= Charlie Simmer =

Canadian ice hockey player

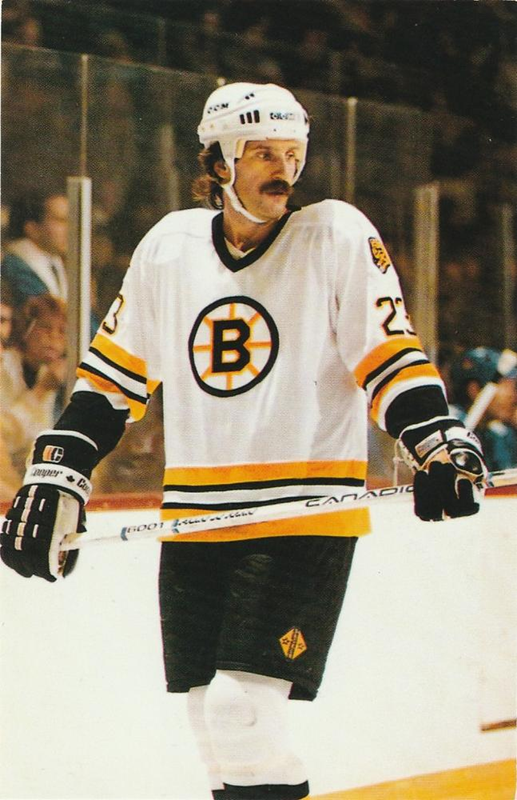
- Simmer with the Boston Bruins in 1984
- Born: March 20, 1954 (age 72) Terrace Bay, Ontario, Canada
- Height: 6 ft 3 in (191 cm)
- Weight: 210 lb (95 kg; 15 st 0 lb)
- Position: Left wing
- Shot: Left
- Played for: California Golden Seals; Cleveland Barons; Los Angeles Kings; Boston Bruins; Pittsburgh Penguins; Eintracht Frankfurt
- National team: Canada
- NHL draft: 39th overall, 1974; California Golden Seals
- WHA draft: 26th overall, 1974; Cleveland Crusaders
- Playing career: 1974–1992

Charles Robert Simmer (born March 20, 1954) is a Canadian former professional ice hockey left winger. He played for 14 seasons in the National Hockey League (NHL) for the California Golden Seals, Cleveland Barons, Los Angeles Kings, Boston Bruins, and Pittsburgh Penguins.

Selected in the third round in the 1974 draft by the Golden Seals, he played a total of 80 games in his first three NHL seasons. Traded to the Los Angeles Kings, he was given significant ice time in the 1978–79 season that saw him score 21 goals in 38 games. He came alive in the following two seasons, scoring 56 goals in both the 1979–80 and 1980–81 seasons while becoming part of a "Triple Crown Line" with Marcel Dionne and Dave Taylor; he shared the NHL goal scoring title in 1980 to become the first (and so far only) Kings player to lead the NHL in goals. A horrific leg injury in March 1981 saw him score just 15 goals in 50 games the following season, but he recorded back-to-back 80-point seasons, even being named to the All-Star Game in 1984. He was traded five games into the 1984–85 season to the Boston Bruins, where he had three straight 60-point seasons. Placed on waivers in 1987 and claimed by Pittsburgh, he recorded 11 goals in 50 games in what ended up being his final NHL season at the age of 34. In 712 games, Simmer recorded 342 goals and 369 assists.

== Playing career ==
After a junior career with the Sault Ste. Marie Greyhounds of the Ontario Hockey Association that saw him score 99 points in his only season (1973–74), Simmer was selected in the third round of the 1974 NHL amateur draft, 39th overall, by the California Golden Seals, where he joined a young field of players such as Larry Patey, Rick Hampton, George Pesut, Al McAdam and Stan Weir. He split his first three professional seasons between the Seals and the Salt Lake Golden Eagles of the CHL, having success in the minors but receiving limited playing time in the NHL. The Seals relocated to Cleveland in 1976, but Simmer did not receive more playing time.

He was traded in 1977 to the Los Angeles Kings, but spent the season with the Springfield Indians of the AHL, winning All-Star accolades. The next season Simmer was promoted halfway through the campaign to the Kings, and scored 21 goals in 39 games.

While with the Kings, he played left wing on the "Triple Crown Line" with Marcel Dionne and Dave Taylor, one of the most potent and famed forward lines of the era. Despite injuries costing him significant playing time, Simmer had back-to-back 56-goal seasons and leading the NHL in goals during the 1979-80 season. Further being named an NHL first team All-Star in 1980 and 1981. In the latter season, Simmer almost accomplished one of hockey's most difficult feats: scoring 50 goals in 50 games. Simmer entered his 50th game with 46 goals and scored three times to finish just shy of the mark; that same night, Mike Bossy became only the second player in NHL history to score 50 in 50. Simmer scored his 50th goal the following night in his 51st game. Simmer's shooting percentage of 32.75 in 1981 was, and remains, an NHL record. Two months later, during a game on March 31 against the Toronto Maple Leafs at Maple Leaf Gardens, Simmer missed a check on defensemen Borje Salming that saw one leg fly in the air while his right skate was caught in the ice, which resulted in a broken right leg. During the 1983-84 season Simmer scored 44 goals and 48 assists leading to him playing in the 1984 NHL all star game and being awarded the Bill Libby Memorial Award as the kings most valuable player.

Simmer was traded at the beginning of the 1985 season to the Boston Bruins, where despite the cumulative effects of several injuries throughout his career, he starred for three more seasons. One season saw him miss games with a broken jaw. In 1986, Simmer won the Bill Masterton Trophy for his perseverance and dedication to hockey; in that season, he missed nearly 20 games with a knee injury before coming back only to be struck in the eye by a stick during a game where he narrowly missed losing sight in. Despite all these injuries Simmer still found a way to be a consistent scorer for the Bruins throughout his tenure tallying 60 plus points in all 3 seasons with 20 goals each time.

Simmer played his final NHL season, for the Pittsburgh Penguins, in 1988. He subsequently played the 1989 season for Eintracht Frankfurt in the German Bundesliga scoring 51 points in 35 games. Then after a season off, he then spent parts of two seasons as a player-coach for the minor league San Diego Gulls before retiring.

== Retirement ==
Simmer finished his NHL career with 711 points (342 goals, 369 assists) in 712 career games. At the time of his retirement, he was the last active player in North American professional hockey to have played for the Seals-Barons franchise (though Dennis Maruk was the last alumnus of the franchise to play in the NHL, upon his retirement in 1989).

In 1994 he was inducted into the Northwestern Ontario sports Hall of Fame.

He was formerly married to one-time Playboy Playmate of the Year Terri Welles; the couple had one daughter. He subsequently remarried in 1995 to Jody and together they had a son and a daughter. Simmer spent years as a color commentator for the Phoenix Coyotes and the Calgary Flames on Sportsnet.

After his career ended, he resided in Calgary for a number of years before moving to Texas along with his wife in the mid-2010s to work with Decca, a consulting company specializing in oil and gas.

In 2023 he was named one of the top 100 Bruins players of all time.

== Career statistics ==
=== Regular season and playoffs ===
			Regular season					Playoffs
Season	Team	League	GP	G	A	Pts	PIM	GP	G	A	Pts	PIM
1971–72	Kenora Muskies	MJHL	45	14	31	45	77	—	—	—	—	—
1972–73	Kenora Muskies	MJHL	48	43	68	111	57	—	—	—	—	—
1973–74	Sault Ste. Marie Greyhounds	OHA	70	45	54	99	137	—	—	—	—	—
1974–75	California Golden Seals	NHL	35	8	13	21	26	—	—	—	—	—
1974–75	Salt Lake Golden Eagles	CHL	47	12	29	41	86	—	—	—	—	—
1975–76	California Golden Seals	NHL	21	1	1	2	22	—	—	—	—	—
1975–76	Salt Lake Golden Eagles	CHL	42	23	16	39	96	—	—	—	—	—
1976–77	Cleveland Barons	NHL	24	2	0	2	16	—	—	—	—	—
1976–77	Salt Lake Golden Eagles	CHL	51	32	30	62	37	—	—	—	—	—
1977–78	Los Angeles Kings	NHL	3	0	0	0	2	—	—	—	—	—
1977–78	Springfield Indians	AHL	75	42	41	83	100	4	0	1	1	5
1978–79	Los Angeles Kings	NHL	37	21	27	48	16	2	1	0	1	2
1978–79	Springfield Indians	AHL	39	13	23	36	33	—	—	—	—	—
1979–80	Los Angeles Kings	NHL	64	56	45	101	65	3	2	0	2	0
1980–81	Los Angeles Kings	NHL	65	56	49	105	62	—	—	—	—	—
1981–82	Los Angeles Kings	NHL	50	15	24	39	42	10	4	7	11	22
1982–83	Los Angeles Kings	NHL	80	29	51	80	51	—	—	—	—	—
1983–84	Los Angeles Kings	NHL	79	44	48	92	78	—	—	—	—	—
1984–85	Los Angeles Kings	NHL	5	1	0	1	4	—	—	—	—	—
1984–85	Boston Bruins	NHL	63	33	30	63	35	5	2	2	4	2
1985–86	Boston Bruins	NHL	55	36	24	60	42	3	0	0	0	4
1986–87	Boston Bruins	NHL	80	29	40	69	59	1	0	0	0	2
1987–88	Pittsburgh Penguins	NHL	50	11	17	28	24	—	—	—	—	—
1988–89	Frankfurt Lions	GER	36	19	32	51	68	4	1	2	3	13
1990–91	San Diego Gulls	IHL	43	16	7	23	63	—	—	—	—	—
1991–92	San Diego Gulls	IHL	1	0	0	0	0	—	—	—	—	—
NHL totals			712	342	369	711	544	24	9	9	18	32

=== International ===
Medal record

Representing Canada

World Championships
Bronze medal – third place	1983 West Germany	

Year	Team	Event	Result	GP	G	A	Pts	PIM
1983	Canada	WC	3rd place, bronze medalist(s)	10	2	3	5	8
Senior totals				10	2	3	5	8

== Awards and achievements ==
- MJHL first All-Star team (1973)
- MJHL Scoring Champion (1973)
- NHL All-Star Game in 1981 and 1984.
- NHL first All-Star team in 1980 and 1981.
- Bill Libby Memorial Award in 1984
- Bill Masterton Trophy in 1986.
- Central Hockey League second All-Star team in 1977.
- American Hockey League second All-Star team in 1978.
- Scored goals in thirteen consecutive games in 1980, the longest such streak since Punch Broadbent's still unbroken record of sixteen in 1922.

Preceded by Anders Hedberg	Bill Masterton Trophy winner 1986	Succeeded by Doug Jarvis
Preceded by Mike Bossy	NHL Goal Leader; 1980 (tied with Danny Gare and Blaine Stoughton)	Succeeded by Mike Bossy
