= Matt Roy (ice hockey) =

American ice hockey player (born 1995)

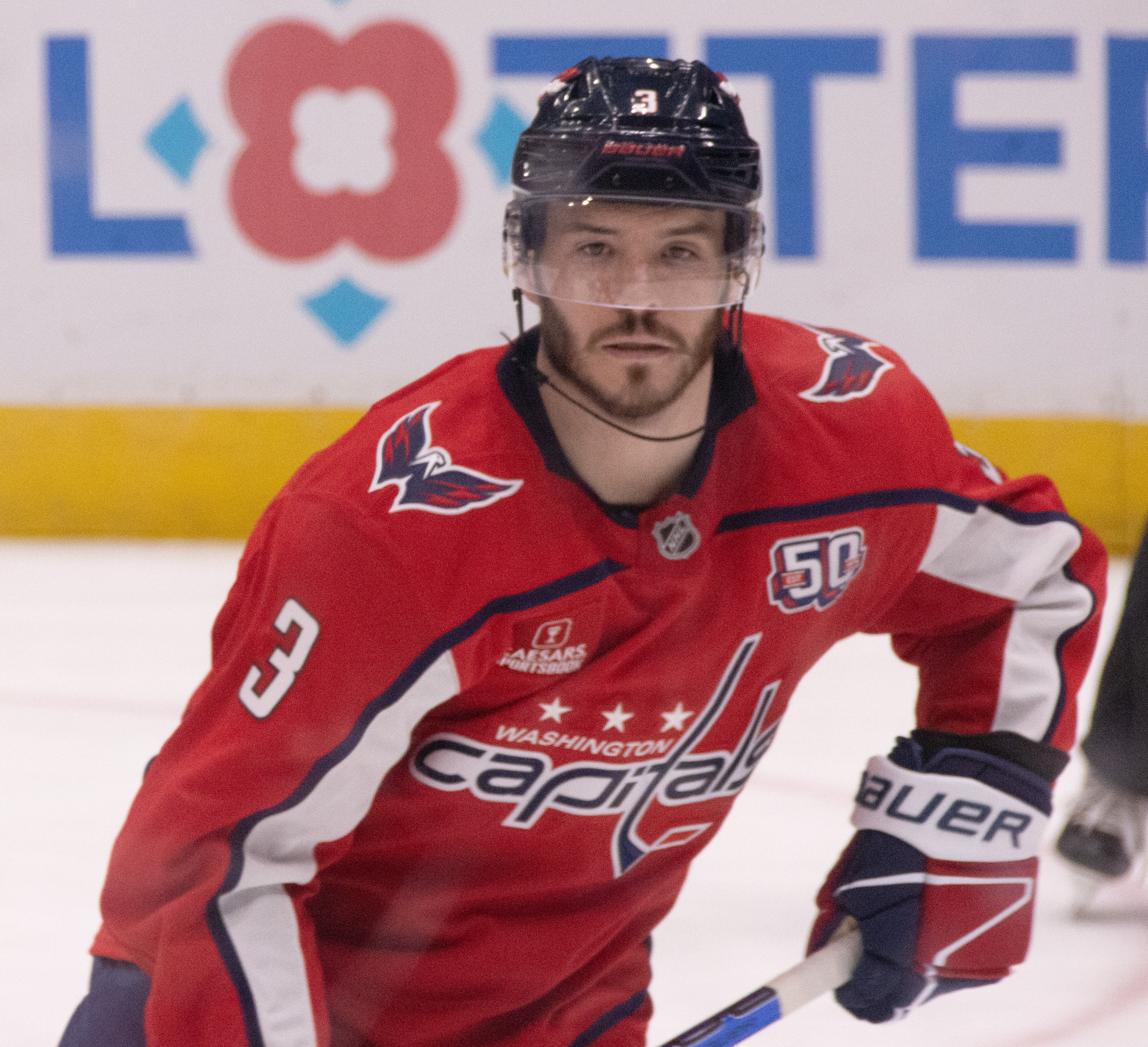
- Roy with the Washington Capitals in 2025
- Born: March 1, 1995 (age 31) Canton, Michigan, U.S.
- Height: 6 ft 1 in (185 cm)
- Weight: 201 lb (91 kg; 14 st 5 lb)
- Position: Defense
- Shoots: Right
- NHL team Former teams: Washington Capitals; Los Angeles Kings
- National team: United States
- NHL draft: 194th overall, 2015; Los Angeles Kings
- Playing career: 2017–present

Matthew Alan Roy (born March 1, 1995) is an American professional ice hockey player who is a defenseman and alternate captain for the Washington Capitals of the National Hockey League (NHL). He was selected in the seventh round, 194th overall, by the Los Angeles Kings in the 2015 NHL entry draft.

== Playing career ==
Roy spent three seasons playing Tier 1 Elite Hockey League hockey with Victory Honda, serving as captain for the U18 team in his last season, before joining the Indiana Ice in the United States Hockey League. He was one of six players on the Indiana Ice from Michigan to win the 2014 Clark Cup. After the Indiana Ice disbanded following the 2013–2014 season, Roy's playing rights were sent to the Dubuque Fighting Saints.

=== Collegiate ===
Roy began his freshman season at Michigan Tech playing in 36 games during the 2014–15 season. His plus-minus rating ranked third amongst freshman in the NCAA as the Huskies ranked second in the conference. After his freshman season, Roy was drafted 194th overall by the Los Angeles Kings in the 2015 NHL entry draft.

In his sophomore season, Roy played in 37 games and recorded a then-career high 20 points. He finished the season ranked third among WCHA defensemen in points and was selected for the All-WCHA Second Team. His junior season was also successful offensively, with Roy putting up a career high 23 points and being named to the All-WCHA First Team. He was also the co-winner of the team's MVP award, the Merv Youngs Award.

=== Professional ===
==== Los Angeles Kings ====
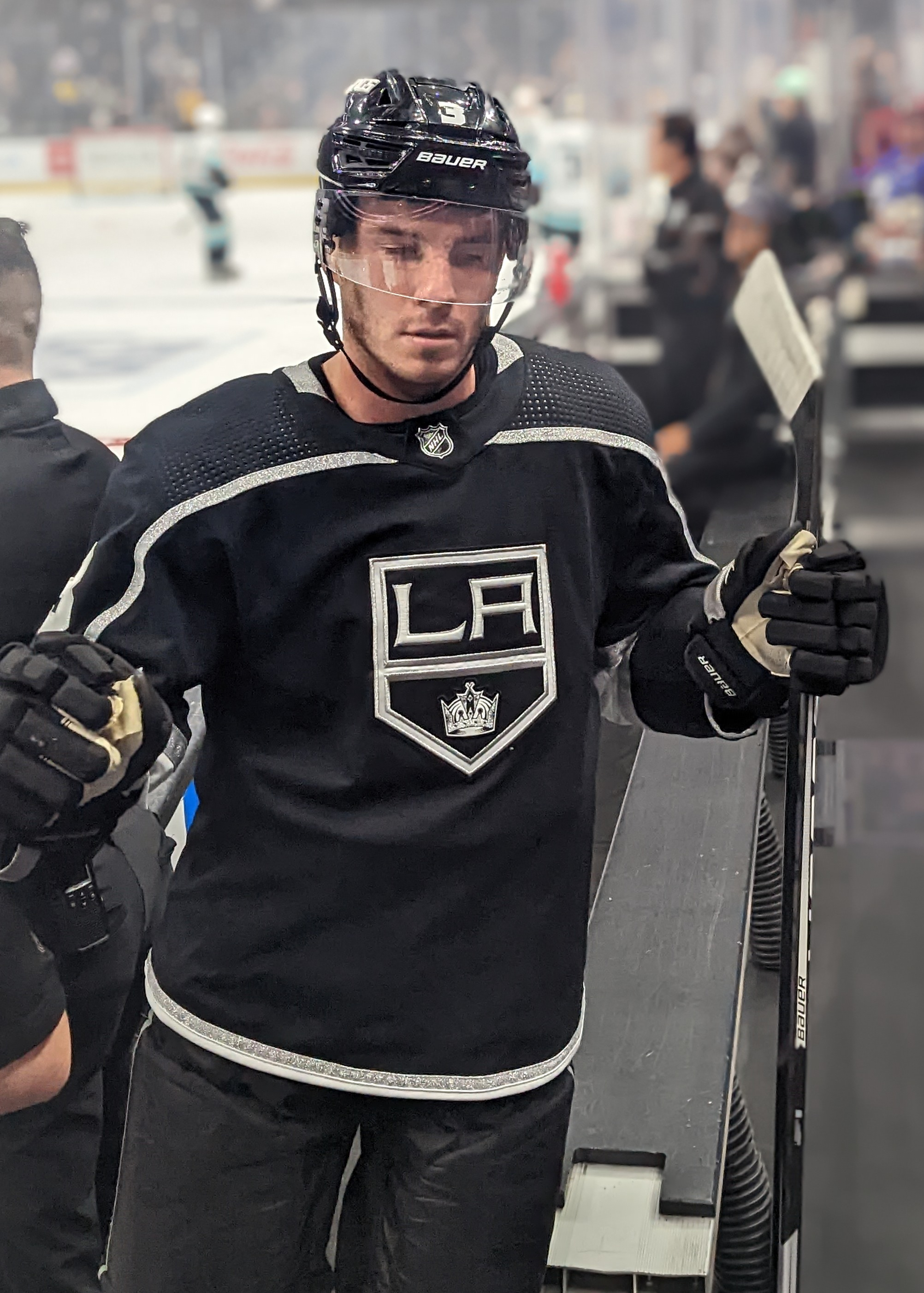
Roy during warmups in October 2022.

After completing his junior season with the Michigan Tech Huskies of the Western Collegiate Hockey Association, Roy was signed to a two-year, entry-level contract with the Kings on March 27, 2017. He immediately joined the Kings' AHL affiliate, the Ontario Reign, on an amateur try-out for the remainder of the 2016–17 season.

After attending the Kings training camp, Roy was reassigned to the Reign for the 2018–19 season. On February 16, 2019, Roy was called up to the NHL after playing in 44 games with the Reign. He made his NHL debut that night in a 4–2 loss to the Boston Bruins. Roy recorded his first career assist on Austin Wagner's goal in a 3–1 loss to the Nashville Predators.

Roy suffered a concussion after he was boarded by Minnesota Wild forward Kevin Fiala on January 28, 2021. Fiala was suspended 3 games for the hit from behind.

On March 21, 2021, Roy signed a three-year, $9.45 million contract extension with the Kings.

==== Washington Capitals ====
Following six seasons in the NHL with the Kings, on July 1, 2024, Roy was signed as a free agent to a six-year, $34.5 million contract with the Washington Capitals, carrying an average annual value of $5.75 million.

== Career statistics ==
=== Regular season and playoffs ===
			Regular season					Playoffs
Season	Team	League	GP	G	A	Pts	PIM	GP	G	A	Pts	PIM
2011–12	Victory Honda 18U AAA	T1EHL	37	1	8	9	28	—	—	—	—	—
2012–13	Victory Honda 18U AAA	T1EHL	41	12	21	33	62	—	—	—	—	—
2012–13	Indiana Ice	USHL	10	1	2	3	4	—	—	—	—	—
2013–14	Indiana Ice	USHL	24	4	5	9	21	12	2	4	6	4
2014–15	Michigan Tech University	WCHA	36	0	9	9	22	—	—	—	—	—
2015–16	Michigan Tech University	WCHA	37	7	13	20	37	—	—	—	—	—
2016–17	Michigan Tech University	WCHA	42	5	21	26	74	—	—	—	—	—
2016–17	Ontario Reign	AHL	8	0	1	1	7	2	0	0	0	2
2017–18	Ontario Reign	AHL	49	4	13	17	23	4	1	1	2	0
2018–19	Ontario Reign	AHL	45	8	21	29	17	—	—	—	—	—
2018–19	Los Angeles Kings	NHL	25	2	4	6	8	—	—	—	—	—
2019–20	Los Angeles Kings	NHL	70	4	14	18	10	—	—	—	—	—
2020–21	Los Angeles Kings	NHL	44	2	8	10	8	—	—	—	—	—
2021–22	Los Angeles Kings	NHL	67	2	19	21	28	7	0	1	1	0
2022–23	Los Angeles Kings	NHL	82	9	17	26	22	6	1	2	3	0
2023–24	Los Angeles Kings	NHL	81	5	20	25	42	5	0	2	2	2
2024–25	Washington Capitals	NHL	69	3	21	24	25	10	0	2	2	2
2025–26	Washington Capitals	NHL	79	2	17	19	12	—	—	—	—	—
NHL totals			517	29	120	149	155	28	1	7	8	4

Medal record

Representing United States

Ice hockey

World Championships
Bronze medal – third place	2021 Latvia	

=== International ===
Year	Team	Event	Result	GP	G	A	Pts	PIM
2021	United States	WC	3rd place, bronze medalist(s)	8	0	1	1	4
Senior totals				8	0	1	1	4

== Awards and honours ==
Award	Year
USHL
Clark Cup (Indiana Ice)	2014
College
WCHA Second All-Star Team	2016
WCHA First All-Star Team	2017
