= Mattias Norström =

Swedish ice hockey player (born 1972)

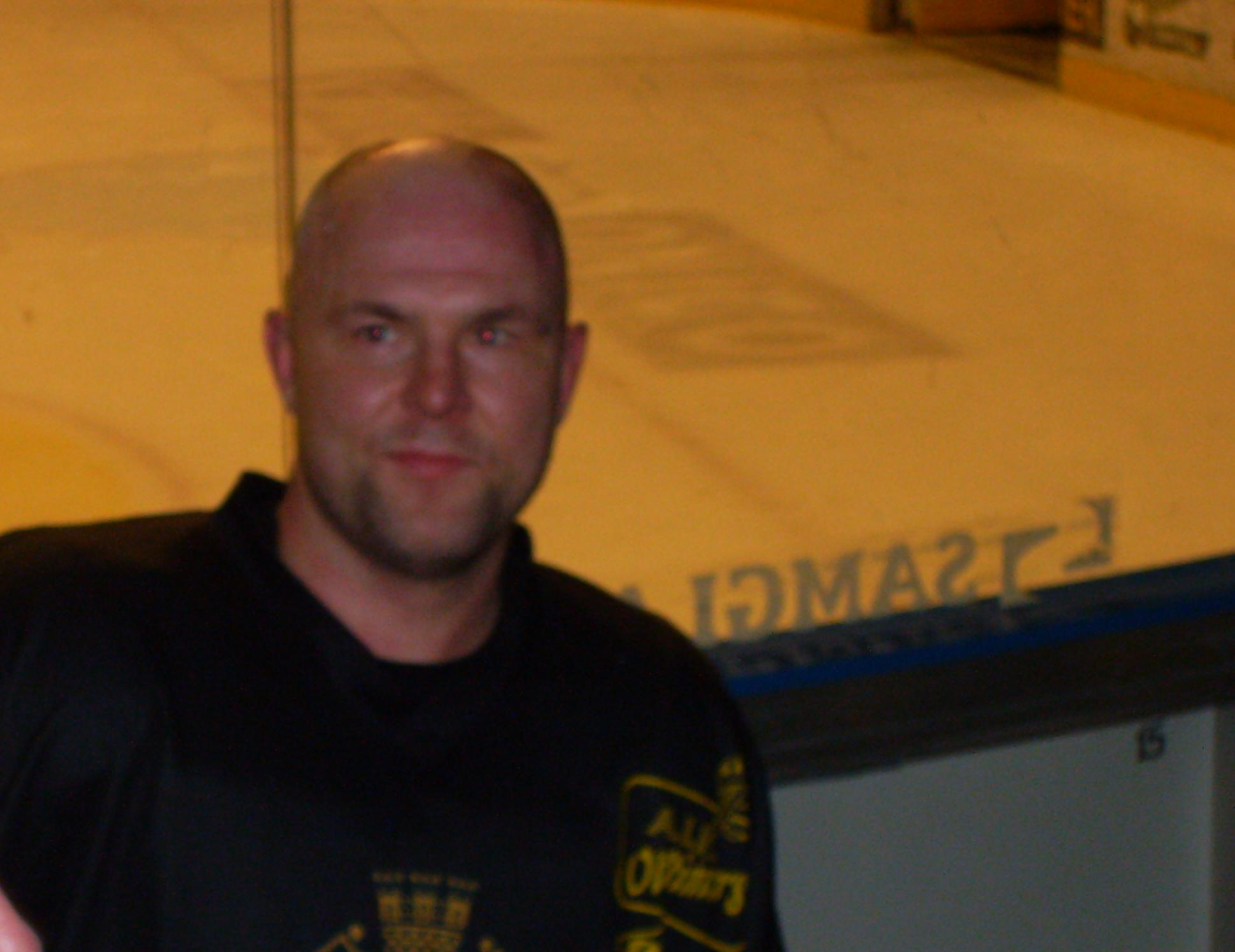
- Norström in 2009
- Born: 2 January 1972 (age 54) Stockholm, Sweden
- Height: 6 ft 2 in (188 cm)
- Weight: 210 lb (95 kg; 15 st 0 lb)
- Position: Defence
- Shot: Left
- Played for: AIK; New York Rangers; Los Angeles Kings; Dallas Stars
- National team: Sweden
- NHL draft: 48th overall, 1992; New York Rangers
- Playing career: 1993–2008
Medal record
Representing Sweden
ice hockey
World Championships
Gold medal – first place	1998 Switzerland
Silver medal – second place	1997 Finland
Silver medal – second place	2003 Finland
World Junior Championships
Silver medal – second place	1992 Germany

Erik Johan Mattias "Notan" Norström (born 2 January 1972) is a Swedish former professional ice hockey defenceman, currently working for the AIK organization. Norström began his National Hockey League (NHL) career with the New York Rangers. However, he is most noted for his ten seasons as a member of the Los Angeles Kings for whom he served as team captain from 2001–2007; he was the team's first non-North American-born captain and would represent the Kings twice in the NHL All Star Game. Norström played the final season of his NHL career for the Dallas Stars.

== Playing career ==
=== AIK ===
As a youngster, he played for several years in the "talent factory" Huddinge IK although this original club was Mälarhöjden/Bredäng Hockey. In his teens he moved from Huddinge to AIK (Stockholm), where he started playing in the senior team from 1991. He was drafted in the second round, 48th overall, by the New York Rangers in the 1992 NHL entry draft and began his NHL career in 1993 with that team.

=== NHL ===
Norström split his time in the Rangers organization between the parent club and their American Hockey League (AHL) affiliate, the Binghamton Rangers. On 14 March 1996, he was traded with Nathan LaFayette, Ian Laperrière, Ray Ferraro and a draft pick to the Los Angeles Kings for Marty McSorley, Jari Kurri and Shane Churla. In Los Angeles he developed into a solid stay-at-home defender and anchor of the Kings' blueline. On 1 October 2001, he was appointed team captain after Rob Blake had been traded to the Colorado Avalanche.

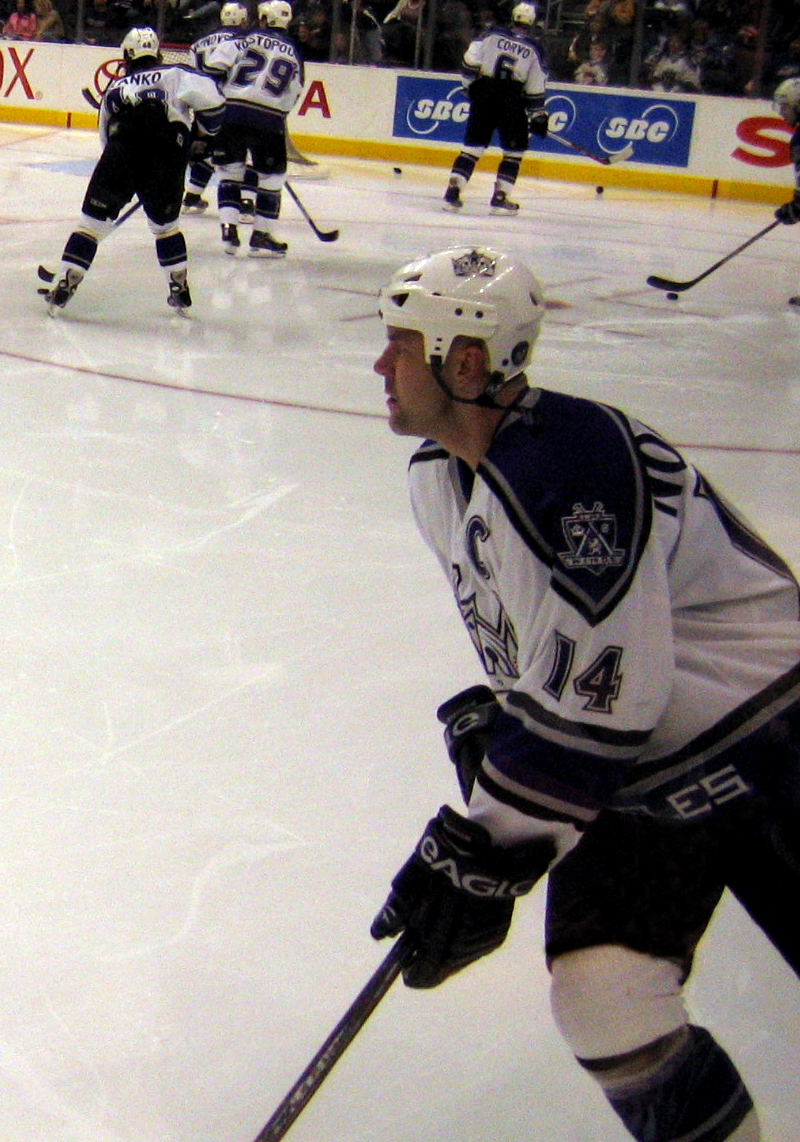
Mattias Norström warms up on 2 January 2006, at the Staples Center.

During the NHL lockout in 2004–05, Norström played with his previous Swedish team, AIK. The team was playing in the third-tier league, struggling to advance, when Norström arrived. He helped lead them through the playoffs, and to secure a spot in the second tier league the following year.

Norström was originally appointed to the Swedish national team for the 2006 Olympic Games in Turin but had to withdraw due to injury.

When Rob Blake returned to the Kings on 1 July 2006, Norström called him and offered the captaincy back. Blake refused at his presentation press conference and told the media that he regarded "Matty" as the obvious captain and the "core and soul" of the Kings.

Norström was acquired by the Dallas Stars through a trade with the Kings on 27 February 2007, which sent defencemen Jaroslav Modrý and Johan Fransson, a 2008 first round draft pick, a 2007 second round draft pick, and a 2007 third round draft pick to Los Angeles in exchange for Norström, forward Konstantin Pushkarev, a 2007 third round pick, and a 2007 fourth round pick.

On 30 April 2008, he scored the game-winning goal (and first NHL playoff goal of his career) in the first overtime against the San Jose Sharks, allowing the Stars to take a 3–0 series lead.

On 10 June 2008, Norström announced his retirement from hockey. On 20 June 2011, Norström joined the AIK organization as a sports manager and sounding board for Anders Gozzi.

== Career achievements ==
- 1992 IIHF – Silver medal World Junior Ice Hockey Championships
- 1997 IIHF – Silver medal Ice Hockey World Championship
- 1998 Winter Olympics
- 1998 IIHF – Gold medal World Championships
- 2002 Winter Olympics
- 2003 IIHF – Silver medal Ice Hockey World Championship
- 2x NHL All-Star (1999 & 2004)
- Los Angeles Kings Quarter-Century 2nd Team

== Career statistics ==
=== Regular season and playoffs ===
			Regular season					Playoffs
Season	Team	League	GP	G	A	Pts	PIM	GP	G	A	Pts	PIM
1990–91	Mora IK	SWE.2	9	1	1	2	6	1	0	0	0	2
1991–92	AIK	SEL	39	4	4	8	28	3	0	2	2	2
1992–93	AIK	SEL	22	0	1	1	16	—	—	—	—	—
1993–94	Binghamton Rangers	AHL	55	1	9	10	70	—	—	—	—	—
1993–94	New York Rangers	NHL	9	0	1	1	6	—	—	—	—	—
1994–95	Binghamton Rangers	AHL	63	9	10	19	91	—	—	—	—	—
1994–95	New York Rangers	NHL	9	0	3	3	2	3	0	0	0	0
1995–96	New York Rangers	NHL	25	2	1	3	22	—	—	—	—	—
1995–96	Los Angeles Kings	NHL	11	0	1	1	18	—	—	—	—	—
1996–97	Los Angeles Kings	NHL	80	1	21	22	84	—	—	—	—	—
1997–98	Los Angeles Kings	NHL	73	1	12	13	90	4	0	0	0	0
1998–99	Los Angeles Kings	NHL	78	2	5	7	36	—	—	—	—	—
1999–2000	Los Angeles Kings	NHL	82	1	13	14	66	4	0	0	0	6
2000–01	Los Angeles Kings	NHL	82	0	18	18	60	13	0	2	2	16
2001–02	Los Angeles Kings	NHL	79	2	9	11	38	7	0	0	0	4
2002–03	Los Angeles Kings	NHL	82	0	6	6	49	—	—	—	—	—
2003–04	Los Angeles Kings	NHL	74	1	13	14	44	—	—	—	—	—
2004–05	AIK	SWE.3	—	—	—	—	—	8	1	0	1	4
2005–06	Los Angeles Kings	NHL	77	4	23	27	58	—	—	—	—	—
2006–07	Los Angeles Kings	NHL	62	2	7	9	40	—	—	—	—	—
2006–07	Dallas Stars	NHL	14	0	2	2	8	7	0	0	0	8
2007–08	Dallas Stars	NHL	66	2	11	13	40	18	2	3	5	16
NHL totals			903	18	146	164	661	56	2	5	7	54

=== International ===
Year	Team	Event	GP	G	A	Pts	PIM
1992	Sweden	WJC	7	0	1	1	10
1996	Sweden	WC	6	0	0	0	6
1996	Sweden	WCH	4	0	1	1	0
1997	Sweden	WC	11	0	2	2	14
1998	Sweden	OG	4	0	1	1	2
1998	Sweden	WC	1	0	0	0	0
2000	Sweden	WC	6	0	1	1	8
2002	Sweden	OG	4	0	0	0	0
2003	Sweden	WC	9	1	2	3	8
2004	Sweden	WCH	4	0	0	0	0
2005	Sweden	WC	9	0	7	7	2
Junior totals			7	0	1	1	10
Senior totals			58	1	14	15	40

Preceded by Rob Blake	Los Angeles Kings captain 2001–07	Succeeded by Rob Blake
