= Dmitri Khristich =

- Born: 23 July 1969 (age 57) Kyiv, Ukrainian SSR, Soviet Union
- Height: 6 ft 1 in (185 cm)
- Weight: 207 lb (94 kg; 14 st 11 lb)
- Position: Right wing
- Shot: Right
- Played for: Metallurg Magnitogorsk; Toronto Maple Leafs; Boston Bruins; Los Angeles Kings; Washington Capitals; Sokil Kyiv; Ukraine men's national ice hockey team Soviet Union men's national ice hockey team
- Coached for: Edinburgh Capitals; Ukraine men's national ice hockey team
- National team: Soviet Union and Ukraine
- NHL draft: 120th overall, 1988; Washington Capitals
- Playing career: 1984–2004
Medal record
Men's ice hockey
Representing Soviet Union
World Championships
Gold medal – first place	1990 Switzerland
Goodwill Games
Gold medal – first place	1990 Seattle
World Junior Championships
Gold medal – first place	1989 United States
European Junior Championships
Bronze medal – third place	1987 Finland

Dmitri Anatoliyovich Khristich (Note: Ukrainian: Дмитро Анатолійович Христич, romanized: Dmytro Anatoliiovych Khrystych; Russian: Дмитрий Анатольевич Христич, romanized: Dmitry Anatolyevich Khristich) (in Ukrainian: Дмитро Анатолійович Христич) (born July 23, 1969) is a former professional ice hockey player and head coach of the national ice hockey team of Ukraine.

Khristich played 811 games in the NHL in his career, for the Washington Capitals, Los Angeles Kings, Boston Bruins, and Toronto Maple Leafs. He was the head coach of EIHL side the Edinburgh Capitals, joining in June 2017 but departing in December of the same year. Since 2023, he is the head coach of the national ice hockey team of Ukraine.

== Achievements ==
Khristich appeared in the 1997 and 1999 NHL All-Star Games. In the 1998–99 season, he had the highest shooting percentage (20.1%) among players with at least 82 shots (an average of at least one shot per scheduled game). He is the all-time scoring leader for players born and trained in Ukraine.

== Transactions ==
- July 8, 1995 – Traded to the Los Angeles Kings with Byron Dafoe for the Kings' 1st round choice (Alexandre Volchkov) and the Dallas Stars' 4th round choice (previously acquired, Washington selected Justin Davis) in the 1996 NHL entry draft.
- August 29, 1997 – Traded to the Boston Bruins with Byron Dafoe for Jozef Stümpel, Sandy Moger, and the Bruins' 4th round choice (later traded to the New Jersey Devils, who selected Pierre Dagenais) in the 1998 NHL entry draft.
- October 20, 1999 – Traded to the Toronto Maple Leafs for the Maple Leafs' 2nd round choice (Ivan Huml) in the 2000 NHL entry draft.
- December 11, 2000 – Traded back to the Washington Capitals for the Tampa Bay Lightning's 3rd round choice (previously acquired, the Maple Leafs selected Brendan Bell) in the 2001 NHL entry draft.

== International play ==
Khristich represented the Soviet Union in the 1990 World Ice Hockey Championships where he won a gold medal. He played for Ukraine at the 2001, 2002 and 2003 World Championships. He also represented Ukraine at the 2002 Winter Olympics. He played two games and scored two goals. The team finished in 10th place.

== Awards ==
- Selected to two NHL All-Star Games: 1997, 1999

== Career statistics ==
=== Regular season and playoffs ===
			Regular season					Playoffs
Season	Team	League	GP	G	A	Pts	PIM	GP	G	A	Pts	PIM
1985–86	Sokil Kyiv	USSR	4	0	0	0	0	—	—	—	—	—
1986–87	Sokil Kyiv	USSR	20	3	0	3	4	—	—	—	—	—
1986–87	ShVSM Kyiv	USSR II	7	1	1	2	6	—	—	—	—	—
1987–88	Sokil Kyiv	USSR	37	9	1	10	18	—	—	—	—	—
1987–88	ShVSM Kyiv	USSR II	4	4	0	4	4	—	—	—	—	—
1988–89	Sokil Kyiv	USSR	42	17	10	27	15	—	—	—	—	—
1989–90	Sokil Kyiv	USSR	47	14	22	36	32	—	—	—	—	—
1990–91	Sokil Kyiv	USSR	28	10	12	22	20	—	—	—	—	—
1990–91	Baltimore Skipjacks	AHL	3	0	0	0	0	—	—	—	—	—
1990–91	Washington Capitals	NHL	40	13	14	27	21	11	1	3	4	6
1991–92	Washington Capitals	NHL	80	36	37	73	35	7	3	2	5	15
1992–93	Washington Capitals	NHL	64	31	35	66	28	6	2	5	7	2
1993–94	Washington Capitals	NHL	83	29	29	58	73	11	2	3	5	10
1994–95	Washington Capitals	NHL	48	12	14	26	41	7	1	4	5	0
1995–96	Los Angeles Kings	NHL	76	27	37	64	44	—	—	—	—	—
1996–97	Los Angeles Kings	NHL	75	19	37	56	38	—	—	—	—	—
1997–98	Boston Bruins	NHL	82	29	37	66	42	6	2	2	4	2
1998–99	Boston Bruins	NHL	79	29	42	71	48	12	3	4	7	6
1999–2000	Toronto Maple Leafs	NHL	53	12	18	30	24	12	1	2	3	0
2000–01	Toronto Maple Leafs	NHL	27	3	6	9	8	—	—	—	—	—
2000–01	Washington Capitals	NHL	43	10	19	29	8	3	0	0	0	0
2001–02	Washington Capitals	NHL	61	9	12	21	12	—	—	—	—	—
2002–03	Metallurg Magnitogorsk	RSL	31	9	12	21	20	3	0	0	0	4
2003–04	Metallurg Magnitogorsk	RSL	38	4	7	11	20	—	—	—	—	—
NHL totals			811	259	337	596	422	75	15	25	40	41
USSR totals			178	53	45	98	89	—	—	—	—	—

=== International ===
Year	Team	Event	GP	G	A	Pts	PIM
1987	Soviet Union	EJC	7	7	0	7	2
1988	Soviet Union	WJC	7	1	1	2	0
1989	Soviet Union	WJC	7	6	2	8	2
1990	Soviet Union	WC	7	2	3	5	4
2001	Ukraine	WC	6	1	2	3	2
2002	Ukraine	OG	2	2	0	2	0
2002	Ukraine	WC	6	0	3	3	6
2003	Ukraine	WC	6	0	1	1	28
Junior totals			21	14	3	17	4
Senior totals			27	5	9	14	40
