= Byron Dafoe =

Canadian ice hockey player (born 1971)

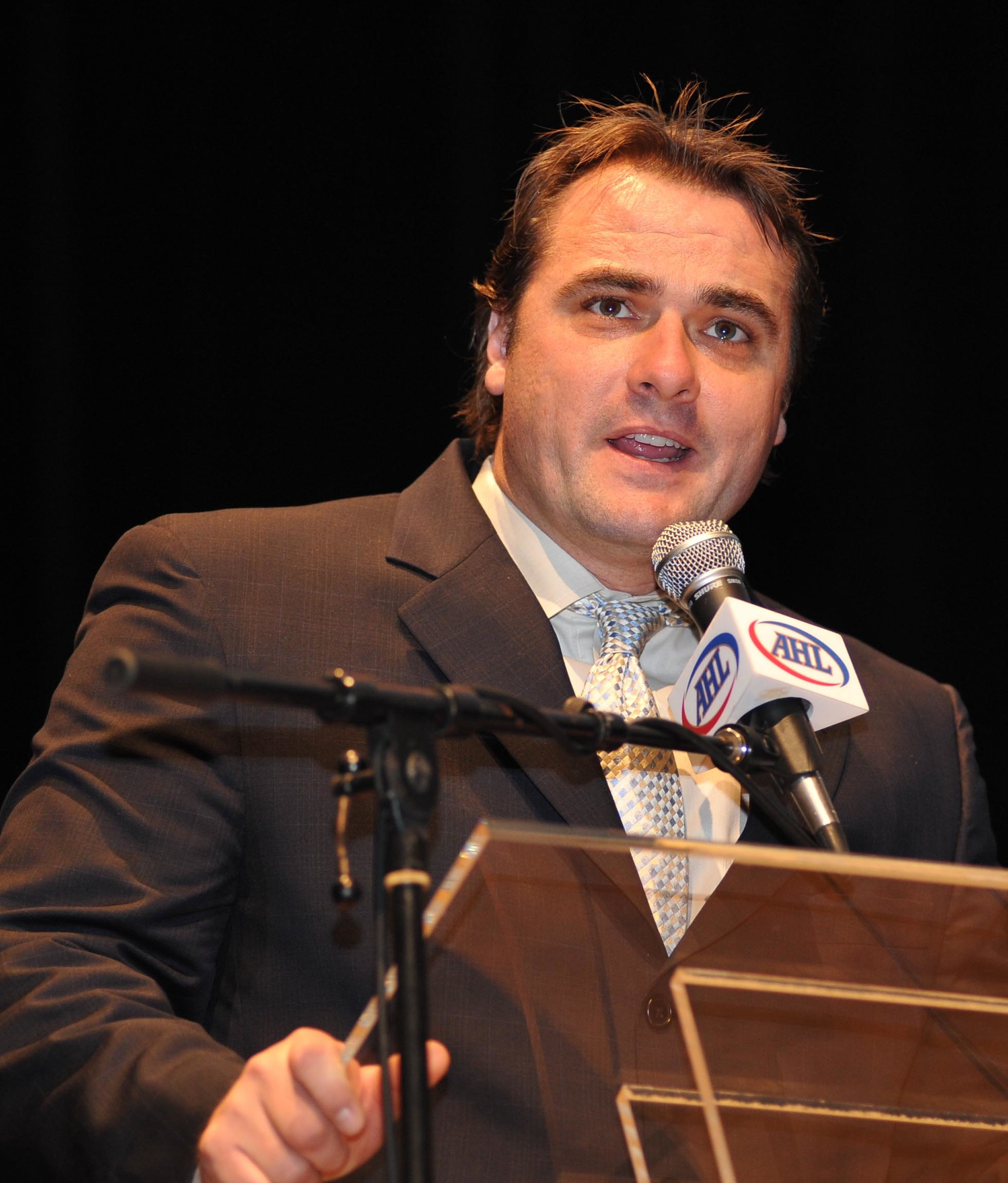
- Dafoe in 2010
- Born: February 25, 1971 (age 55) Worthing, England
- Height: 5 ft 11 in (180 cm)
- Weight: 190 lb (86 kg; 13 st 8 lb)
- Position: Goaltender
- Caught: Left
- Played for: Washington Capitals; Los Angeles Kings; Boston Bruins; Atlanta Thrashers
- NHL draft: 35th overall, 1989; Washington Capitals
- Playing career: 1991–2004

Byron Dafoe (born February 25, 1971) is a Canadian former professional ice hockey goaltender. He was born in Worthing, England, United Kingdom and moved to Comox, British Columbia with his mother at the age of two months. Between 1992 and 2004, he played in the National Hockey League (NHL) for the Washington Capitals, Los Angeles Kings, Boston Bruins and Atlanta Thrashers.

== Playing career ==
=== Junior and minor leagues ===
Dafoe has played for WHL sides Portland Winter Hawks (1986–1990) and Prince Albert Raiders (1990–1991), ECHL side Hampton Roads Admirals, AHL sides Baltimore Skipjacks (1991–1992 and 1992–1993), New Haven Nighthawks (1992) and Portland Pirates (1993–1994 and 1994–1995), and IHL side Phoenix Roadrunners. He was voted a First Team AHL All-Star in 1993-94 and won a Calder Cup championship that season with the Portland Pirates.

During Dafoe's time with the Winter Hawks, he had an on-ice fistfight with Tri-City Americans goaltender Olaf Kölzig, someone with whom he would go on to have a friendly rivalry in the NHL—so friendly that they served as each other's best man when they got married. He and Kolzig also had a "friendly" fight later in their NHL careers on November 21, 1998, when the Boston Bruins took on the Washington Capitals. During the game, a fight broke out that was so violent and all encompassing, the goalies (Dafoe and Kolzig) also got caught up in it. The fight between the goalies was primarily comedic, with both Dafoe and Kolzig laughing as they landed punches.

=== Washington Capitals ===
Dafoe was drafted 35th overall in the second round of the 1989 NHL entry draft by the Washington Capitals, and made his NHL debut in the 1992–93 NHL season. Dafoe was one of two goalies taken by Washington in that draft, as they used their first round pick to select Olaf Kölzig. After appearing in just one game in 1992–93, Dafoe got into five the next season while veterans Don Beaupre and Rick Tabaracci handled the bulk of the work. In the 1994–95 NHL season Dafoe suited up for four games, in part due to the emergence of another second round pick, 1992 selection Jim Carey, who took the NHL by storm as a rookie. The Capitals had an abundance of riches in goal and packaged Dafoe with winger Dmitri Khristich and traded them to the Los Angeles Kings for a first and fourth round draft pick.

=== Los Angeles Kings ===
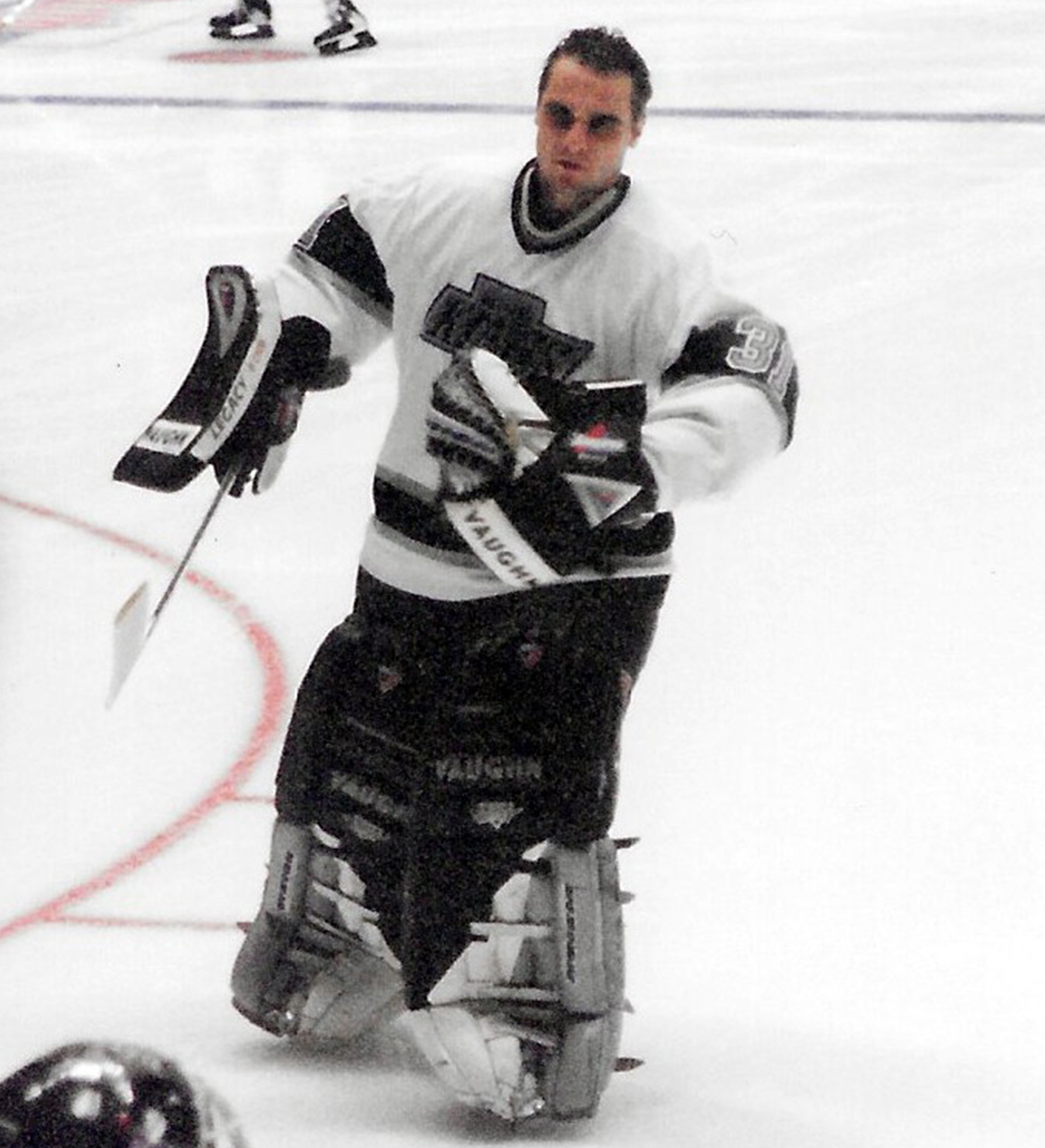
Dafoe with the Los Angeles Kings in 1996

With the Kings, Dafoe not only became an NHL regular but stepped into the starter's role while the previous incumbent, Kelly Hrudey, became his backup. Dafoe played 47 games but won just 14 with a struggling Kings club and posted the worst goals against and save percentage numbers on the team. The following year, Hrudey was with the San Jose Sharks, and Dafoe shared the crease with Stephane Fiset. The duo posted very similar numbers for the club, but in the offseason, the Kings made Fiset their goaltender going forward and Dafoe was again packaged with Dmitri Khristich, and dealt to the Boston Bruins.

=== Boston Bruins ===
With the Bruins, he stepped into the starter's role, pushing aside Jim Carey, who had replaced him back in Washington. Dafoe excelled in Boston, playing 65 games and posting 30 wins with 6 shutouts. The following season, Dafoe helped the Bruins return to the playoffs and win a postseason series. He posted career-best numbers in 1998-99 with a 1.99 goals against average and a .926 save percentage. He finished third in voting for the Vezina Trophy, and was named to the NHL Second All-Star Team, edging out Curtis Joseph in the voting.

Dafoe held out for part of the 1999–2000 season during a contract dispute with Bruins general manager Harry Sinden, and in his return suffered injuries, resulting in a regression from his previous year. He spent three more seasons in Boston, and after playing 41 and 45 games the previous two seasons, in 2002 he played 64 games and won a career-best 35 of them, setting himself up nicely for a new contract. However, when Boston was upset by the Montreal Canadiens in the 2002 post season the Bruins let Dafoe become a free agent.

That summer, the free agent pool included a lot of top netminders including Mike Richter, Ed Belfour and Curtis Joseph, and while the aforementioned earned new contracts, Dafoe remained a free agent as the 2002–03 season began. Nearly two months into the season, Dafoe agreed to a one-year deal with a player's option for a second to join the Atlanta Thrashers.

=== Atlanta Thrashers ===
Thrashers general manager Don Waddell was thrilled to add Dafoe to his club, saying "He's a proven goaltender. His stats prove he's not only a No. 1 goaltender, but one of the top goaltenders in this elite league of the NHL." That optimism proved to be misplaced as Dafoe struggled mightily in Atlanta, posting just five wins in 17 games, and a bloated 4.36 goals against average. He exercised his player option and returned for the 2003–04 season and while his play improved with the goals against cut down dramatically to 3.14, he was an afterthought for the club playing just 18 games and winning only four.

Dafoe retired from professional hockey following the 2004–05 NHL lockout.

== Personal life ==
Along with fellow NHL players Olaf Kölzig and Scott Mellanby, Dafoe is a founder of Athletes Against Autism, as his son has autism. Dafoe has two sons and resides in Kelowna, British Columbia, running a custom home electrical fit-out business.

== Career statistics ==
			Regular season									Playoffs
Season	Team	League	GP	W	L	T	MIN	GA	SO	GAA	SV%	GP	W	L	MIN	GA	SO	GAA	SV%
1988–89	Portland Winter Hawks	WHL	59	29	24	3	3279	291	1	5.32	.861	18	10	8	1091	81	1	4.45	—
1989–90	Portland Winter Hawks	WHL	40	14	21	3	2265	193	0	5.11	.871	—	—	—	—	—	—	—	—
1990–91	Portland Winter Hawks	WHL	8	1	5	1	414	41	0	5.94	.843	—	—	—	—	—	—	—	—
1990–91	Prince Albert Raiders	WHL	32	13	12	4	1839	124	0	4.04	.893	—	—	—	—	—	—	—	—
1991–92	Hampton Roads Admirals	ECHL	10	6	4	0	562	26	0	2.78	.910	—	—	—	—	—	—	—	—
1991–92	Baltimore Skipjacks	AHL	33	12	16	4	1847	119	0	3.86	.885	—	—	—	—	—	—	—	—
1991–92	New Haven Nighthawks	AHL	7	3	2	1	364	22	0	3.63	.898	—	—	—	—	—	—	—	—
1992–93	Washington Capitals	NHL	1	0	0	0	1	0	0	0.00	1.000	—	—	—	—	—	—	—	—
1992–93	Baltimore Skipjacks	AHL	48	16	20	7	2617	191	1	4.38	.865	5	2	3	241	22	0	5.47	.845
1993–94	Washington Capitals	NHL	5	2	2	0	230	13	0	3.39	.871	2	0	2	118	5	0	2.54	.872
1993–94	Portland Pirates	AHL	47	24	16	4	2661	148	1	3.34	.891	1	0	0	8	1	0	7.50	.857
1994–95	Washington Capitals	NHL	4	1	1	1	187	11	0	3.53	.863	1	0	0	20	1	0	3.00	.667
1994–95	Portland Pirates	AHL	6	5	0	0	330	16	0	2.91	.920	7	3	4	417	29	0	4.17	.877
1994–95	Phoenix Roadrunners	IHL	49	25	16	4	2744	169	2	3.70	.889	—	—	—	—	—	—	—	—
1995–96	Los Angeles Kings	NHL	47	14	24	8	2666	172	1	3.87	.888	—	—	—	—	—	—	—	—
1996–97	Los Angeles Kings	NHL	40	13	17	5	2162	112	0	3.11	.905	—	—	—	—	—	—	—	—
1997–98	Boston Bruins	NHL	65	30	25	9	3693	138	6	2.24	.914	6	2	4	422	14	1	1.99	.912
1998–99	Boston Bruins	NHL	68	32	23	11	4001	133	10	1.99	.926	12	6	6	768	26	2	2.03	.921
1999–2000	Boston Bruins	NHL	41	13	16	10	2307	114	3	2.96	.889	—	—	—	—	—	—	—	—
2000–01	Boston Bruins	NHL	45	22	14	7	2536	101	2	2.39	.906	—	—	—	—	—	—	—	—
2001–02	Boston Bruins	NHL	64	35	26	3	3827	141	4	2.21	.907	6	2	4	358	19	0	3.18	.865
2002–03	Atlanta Thrashers	NHL	17	5	11	1	895	65	0	4.36	.862	—	—	—	—	—	—	—	—
2003–04	Atlanta Thrashers	NHL	18	4	11	1	973	51	0	3.14	.898	—	—	—	—	—	—	—	—
NHL totals			415	171	170	56	23,478	1,051	26	2.68	.904	27	10	16	1,686	65	3	2.31	.915

== Awards and honours ==
Award	Year
AHL
First All-Star Team	1994
Hap Holmes Memorial Award	1994
Calder Cup (Portland Pirates)	1994
NHL
Second All-Star Team	1999
Boston Bruins
Bruins Three Stars Awards	1998, 1999, 2002
Seventh Player Award	1999
Elizabeth C. Dufresne Trophy	1999
Named One of Top 100 Best Bruins Players of all Time	2024

== Acting career ==
In 1999, Dafoe played himself in an episode of The Jersey called "Ouch" where Morgan Hudson (played by Courtnee Draper) uses a magical jersey as she jumps into his body in order to get some "real" playing time.

== See also ==
- List of National Hockey League players from the United Kingdom
