= 1995–96 NHL transactions =

This list is for 1995–96 NHL transactions within professional ice hockey league of players in North America. The following contains team-to-team transactions that occurred in the National Hockey League during the 1995–96 NHL season. It lists what team each player has been traded to, or claimed by, and for which players or draft picks, if applicable.

== May ==
Date			References
May 31, 1995	To Hartford Whalers 4th-rd pick – 1995 entry draft (# 85 – Ian MacNeil)	To Los Angeles Kings Jan Vopat	

== June ==
Date			References
June 7, 1995	To Los Angeles Kings 5th-rd pick – 1995 entry draft (# 118 – Jason Morgan)	To Dallas Stars Jeff Mitchell	
June 27, 1995	To Winnipeg Jets Jeff Finley	To Philadelphia Flyers Russ Romaniuk	
June 29, 1995	To Montreal Canadiens Marc Bureau	To Tampa Bay Lightning Brian Bellows	

== July ==
Date			References
July 7, 1995	To Calgary Flames David Ling; 9th-rd pick – 1995 entry draft (# 233 – Steve Shirreffs)	To Colorado Avalanche 9th-rd pick – 1995 entry draft (# 228 – Chris George)	
July 8, 1995	To Buffalo Sabres Michael Peca; Mike Wilson; 1st-rd pick – 1995 entry draft (# 15 – Jay McKee)	To Vancouver Canucks Alexander Mogilny; 5th-rd pick – 1995 entry draft (# 120 – Todd Norman)	
July 8, 1995	To Montreal Canadiens Stephane Quintal	To Winnipeg Jets 2nd-rd pick – 1995 entry draft (# 34 – Jason Doig)	
July 8, 1995	To Dallas Stars 3rd-rd pick – 1995 entry draft (# 69 – Sergei Gusev)	To Winnipeg Jets 2nd-rd pick – 1996 entry draft CHI - (# 31 – Remi Royer)^{1}	
July 8, 1995	To New Jersey Devils 4th-rd pick – 1995 entry draft (# 79 – Alyn McCauley)	To Ottawa Senators Jaroslav Modry	
July 8, 1995	To Mighty Ducks of Anaheim 6th-rd pick – 1996 entry draft (# 149 – Blaine Russell)	To St. Louis Blues 6th-rd pick – 1995 entry draft (# 153 – Denis Hamel)	
July 8, 1995	To Los Angeles Kings Byron Dafoe; Dmitri Khristich	To Washington Capitals 1st-rd pick – 1996 entry draft (# 4 – Alexandre Volchkov); 4th-rd pick – 1996 entry draft (# 85 – Justin Davis)	
July 8, 1995	To Toronto Maple Leafs Larry Murphy	To Pittsburgh Penguins Dmitri Mironov; 2nd-rd pick – 1996 entry draft (NJD - # 41 – Josh DeWolf)^{2}	
July 8, 1995	To Toronto Maple Leafs Rob Zettler	To Philadelphia Flyers 5th-rd pick – 1996 entry draft (# 124 – Per-Ragnar Bergkvist)	
July 8, 1995	To Toronto Maple Leafs Sergio Momesso	To Vancouver Canucks Mike Ridley	
July 12, 1995	To Colorado Avalanche 3rd-rd pick – 1996 entry draft (WAS - # 78 – Shawn McNeil)^{3} 6th-rd pick – 1996 entry draft (# 160 – Kai Fischer)	To Philadelphia Flyers Garth Snow	
July 12, 1995	To Colorado Avalanche John Slaney	To Washington Capitals 3rd-rd pick – 1996 entry draft (# 78 – Shawn McNeil)	
July 14, 1995	To Dallas Stars cash	To Washington Capitals Mike Torchia	
July 27, 1995	To Hartford Whalers Brendan Shanahan	To St. Louis Blues Chris Pronger	
July 28, 1995	To St. Louis Blues Jay Wells	To New York Rangers Doug Lidster	

1. San Jose's second-round pick went to Chicago as the result of a trade on June 22, 1996 that sent a first-round pick in the 1996 entry draft to San Jose in exchange for a second-round pick in the 1996 entry draft (# 46 overall) and this pick.
  San Jose previously acquired this pick as the result of a trade on March 18, 1996 that sent Craig Janney to Winnipeg in exchange for Darren Turcotte and this pick.
2. Pittsburgh's second-round pick went to New Jersey as the result of a trade on June 22, 1996 that sent a second-round pick in the 1996 entry draft (# 28 overall) to Pittsburgh in exchange for a second-round pick in the 1996 entry draft (# 49 overall) and this pick.
3. Colorado's third-round pick went to Washington as the result of a trade on July 12, 1995 that sent John Slaney to Colorado in exchange for this pick.

== August ==
Date			References
August 1, 1995	To Boston Bruins Kevin Stevens; Shawn McEachern	To Pittsburgh Penguins Glen Murray; Bryan Smolinski; 3rd-rd pick – 1996 entry draft (# 72 – Boyd Kane)	
August 4, 1995	To St. Louis Blues 2nd-rd pick – 1996 entry draft (BUF - # 27 – Cory Sarich)^{1}	To Ottawa Senators Steve Duchesne	
August 4, 1995	To Edmonton Oilers Curtis Joseph rights to Mike Grier	To St. Louis Blues 1st-rd pick – 1996 entry draft (# 14 – Marty Reasoner); 1st-rd pick – 1997 entry draft (LAK - # 15 – Matt Zultek)^{2}	
August 17, 1995	To Detroit Red Wings Marc Bergevin; Ben Hankinson	To Tampa Bay Lightning Shawn Burr; 3rd-rd pick – 1996 entry draft (BOS - # 80 – Jason Doyle)^{3}	
August 17, 1995	To Boston Bruins 3rd-rd pick – 1996 entry draft (# 80 – Jason Doyle)	To Tampa Bay Lightning David Shaw	
August 24, 1995	To Vancouver Canucks 6th-rd pick – 1997 entry draft (# 148 – Larry Shapley)	To Edmonton Oilers Brett Hauer	
August 30, 1995	To Toronto Maple Leafs Dmitry Yushkevich; 2nd-rd pick – 1996 entry draft (# 50 – Francis Larivee)	To Philadelphia Flyers 1st-rd pick – 1996 entry draft (# 15 – Dainius Zubrus); 4th-rd pick – 1996 entry draft (LAK -# 84 – Mikael Simons)^{4} 2nd-rd pick – 1997 entry draft (# 30 – Jean-Marc Pelletier)	
August 31, 1995	To Pittsburgh Penguins Petr Nedved; Sergei Zubov	To New York Rangers Luc Robitaille; Ulf Samuelsson	

1. St. Louis' second-round pick went to Buffalo as the result of a trade on March 20, 1996 that sent Yuri Khmylev and an eighth-round pick in the 1996 entry draft to St. Louis in exchange for Jean-Luc Grand-Pierre, a third-round pick in the 1997 entry draft and this pick.
2. St. Louis' first-round pick went to Los Angeles as the result of a trade on February 27, 1996 that sent Wayne Gretzky to St. Louis in exchange for Craig Johnson, Patrice Tardif, Roman Vopat, a fifth-round pick of the 1996 entry draft and this pick.
3. Tampa Bay's third-round pick went to Boston as the result of a trade on August 17, 1995 that sent David Shaw to Tampa Bay in exchange for this pick.
4. Philadelphia's fourth-round pick went to Los Angeles as the result of a trade on March 19, 1996 that sent John Druce and a seventh-round pick in the 1997 entry draft to Philadelphia in exchange for this pick.

== September ==
Date			References
September 14, 1995	To Tampa Bay Lightning 5th-rd pick – 1997 entry draft (# 112 – Karel Betik)	To New York Islanders Alexander Semak	
September 20, 1995	To Colorado Avalanche Jean-Francois Labbe	To Ottawa Senators future considerations	
September 20, 1995	To Winnipeg Jets Andre Faust	To Philadelphia Flyers 7th-rd pick – 1997 entry draft (ANA - # 178 – Tony Mohagen)^{1}	
September 21, 1995	To Dallas Stars cash	To New York Islanders Jason Herter	
September 28, 1995	To St. Louis Blues Dallas Eakins	To Florida Panthers 4th-rd pick – 1997 entry draft (# 95 – Ivan Novoseltsev)	

1. Philadelphia's seventh-round pick went to Anaheim as the result of a trade on February 6, 1996 that sent Bob Corkum to Philadelphia in exchange for Chris Herperger and this pick.

== October ==
Date			References
October 2, 1995	To Toronto Maple Leafs 7th-rd pick – 1997 entry draft (# 190 – Shawn Thornton)	To Colorado Avalanche Warren Rychel	
October 2, 1995	To Dallas Stars Guy Carbonneau	To St. Louis Blues Paul Broten	
October 2, 1995	To Boston Bruins Rick Zombo	To St. Louis Blues Fred Knipscheer	
October 3, 1995	To New Jersey Devils Steve Thomas	To New York Islanders Claude Lemieux	
October 3, 1995	To Colorado Avalanche Claude Lemieux	To New York Islanders Wendel Clark	
October 5, 1995	To New York Rangers Steve Larouche	To Ottawa Senators Jean-Yves Roy	
October 5, 1995	To Colorado Avalanche 4th-rd pick – 1997 entry draft (# 87 – Brad Larsen)	To Tampa Bay Lightning Steven Finn	
October 6, 1995	To Hartford Whalers Nelson Emerson	To Winnipeg Jets Darren Turcotte	
October 7, 1995	To Calgary Flames 4th-rd pick – 1997 entry draft (# 92 – Chris St. Croix)	To Ottawa Senators Frank Musil	
October 17, 1995	To Chicago Blackhawks rights to Igor Ulanov	To Washington Capitals 3rd-rd pick – 1996 entry draft (# 74 – Dave Weninger)	
October 24, 1995	To San Jose Sharks Ray Sheppard	To Detroit Red Wings Igor Larionov	
October 26, 1995	To San Jose Sharks Owen Nolan	To Colorado Avalanche Sandis Ozolinsh	
October 30, 1995	To Mighty Ducks of Anaheim Bobby Marshall	To Calgary Flames Jarrod Skalde	

== November ==
Date			References
November 1, 1995	To Calgary Flames Claude Lapointe	To Colorado Avalanche 7th-rd pick – 1996 entry draft (# 176 – Samuel Pahlsson)	
November 1, 1995	To New Jersey Devils Darin Kimble	To Chicago Blackhawks Bill Armstrong; Mike Vukonich	
November 1, 1995	To New Jersey Devils Esa Tikkanen	To St. Louis Blues 3rd-rd pick – 1997 entry draft (COL - # 78 – Ville Nieminen)^{1}	
November 7, 1995	To Montreal Canadiens Pat Jablonski	To St.Louis Blues Jean-Jacques Daigneault	
November 13, 1995	To Los Angeles Kings Steven Finn	To Tampa Bay Lightning Michel Petit	
November 15, 1995	To New Jersey Devils 2nd-rd pick – 1996 entry draft (PIT - # 28 – Pavel Skrbek)^{2}	To San Jose Sharks Chris Terreri	
November 16, 1995	To San Jose Sharks 1st-rd pick – 1996 entry draft (PHO - # 24 – Daniel Briere)^{3} 4th-rd pick – 1996 entry draft (BUF - # 106 – Mike Martone)^{4} rights to Martin Spanhel	To Philadelphia Flyers Pat Falloon	
November 16, 1995	To Buffalo Sabres Václav Varaďa; 1st-rd pick – 1996 entry draft (PHO - # 24 – Daniel Briere)^{5} 4th-rd pick – 1996 entry draft (# 106 – Mike Martone) rights to Martin Spanhel	To San Jose Sharks Doug Bodger	
November 16, 1995	To Washington Capitals 7th-rd pick – 1997 entry draft (# 170 – Eero Somervuori)	To Tampa Bay Lightning Eric Charron	
November 23, 1995	To New Jersey Devils 2nd-rd pick – 1996 entry draft (# 38 – Wes Mason)	To Vancouver Canucks Esa Tikkanen	
November 25, 1995	To Montreal Canadiens 8th-rd pick – 1997 entry draft (# 197 – Petr Kubos)	To Calgary Flames Craig Ferguson; Yves Sarault	
November 29, 1995	To Hartford Whalers Dan Kesa conditional pick – 1997 entry draft^{6}	To Dallas Stars Robert Petrovicky	

1. St. Louis' third-round pick went to Colorado as the result of a trade on June 21, 1997 that sent two fourth-round picks in the 1996 entry draft (# 98 and # 106 overall) to St. Louis in exchange for a fifth-round pick in the 1998 entry draft and this pick.
2. New Jersey's second-round pick went to Pittsburgh as the result of a trade on June 22, 1996 that sent two second-round picks in the 1996 Entry Draft (# 41 and # 49 overall) to New Jersey in exchange for this pick.
3. Buffalo's acquired first-round pick went to Winnipeg as the result of a trade on February 15, 1996 that sent Michal Grosek and Darryl Shannon to Buffalo in exchange for Craig Muni and this pick. Winnipeg relocated to Arizona after the 1995–96 NHL season.
  Buffalo previously acquired this pick as the result of a trade on November 16, 1995 that sent Doug Bodger to San Jose in exchange for Vaclav Varada, a fourth-round pick in the 1996 entry draft, rights to Martin Spanhel and this pick.
4. San Jose's acquired fourth-round pick went to Buffalo as the result of a trade on November 16, 1995 that sent Doug Bodger to San Jose in exchange for Vaclav Varada, a first-round pick in the 1996 entry draft, rights to Martin Spanhel and this pick.
5. Buffalo's acquired first-round pick went to Winnipeg as the result of a trade on February 15, 1996 that sent Michal Grosek and Darryl Shannon to Buffalo in exchange for Craig Muni and this pick. Winnipeg relocated to Arizona after the 1995–96 NHL season.
6. Conditions of this draft pick are unknown. Hartford made no pick selection belonging to Dallas in the 1997 entry draft.

== December ==
Date			References
December 1, 1995	To Hartford Whalers 9th-rd pick – 1996 entry draft (# 231 – Askhat Rakhmatulin)	To Tampa Bay Lightning Jeff Reese	
December 4, 1995	To Toronto Maple Leafs Peter White; 4th-rd pick – 1996 entry draft (# 86 – Jason Sessa)	To Edmonton Oilers Kent Manderville	
December 6, 1995	To Montreal Canadiens Andrei Kovalenko; Martin Rucinsky; Jocelyn Thibault	To Colorado Avalanche Mike Keane; Patrick Roy	
December 9, 1995	To Boston Bruins Dean Chynoweth	To New York Islanders 5th-rd pick – 1996 entry draft (# 31 – Petr Sachl)	
December 13, 1995	To Dallas Stars Brent Fedyk	To Philadelphia Flyers Trent Klatt	
December 19, 1995	To New Jersey Devils Jocelyn Lemieux; 2nd-rd pick – 1998 entry draft (DAL - # 39 – John Erskine)^{1}	To Hartford Whalers Jim Dowd; 2nd-rd pick – 1997 entry draft (CGY - # 51 – Dmitri Kokorev)^{2}	
December 19, 1995	To Hartford Whalers Jeff Brown; 3rd-rd pick – 1998 entry draft (CGY - # 62 – Paul Manning)^{3}	To Vancouver Canucks Jim Dowd; Frantisek Kucera; 2nd-rd pick – 1997 entry draft (# 34 – Ryan Bonni)	
December 19, 1995	To Dallas Stars Joe Nieuwendyk	To Calgary Flames Jarome Iginla; Corey Millen	
December 28, 1995	To Hartford Whalers Kevin Dineen	To Philadelphia Flyers 7th-rd pick – 1997 entry draft (CAR - # 169 – Andrew Merrick)^{4}	
December 28, 1995	To St. Louis Blues Stephane Matteau	To New York Rangers Ian Laperriere	
December 28, 1995	To Winnipeg Jets Norm MacIver	To Pittsburgh Penguins Neil Wilkinson	
December 28, 1995	To Los Angeles Kings John Slaney	To Colorado Avalanche 6th-rd pick – 1996 entry draft (# 146 – Brian Willsie)	

1. New Jersey's second-round pick went to Dallas as the result of a trade on June 27, 1998 that sent a first-round pick in the 1998 entry draft to New Jersey in exchange for a second-round pick in the 1998 entry draft (# 57 overall) and this pick.
2. Carolina's second-round pick went to Calgary as the result of a trade on March 5, 1997 that sent Steve Chiasson and a third-round pick in the 1997 Entry Draft to Hartford in exchange for Hnat Domenichelli, Glen Featherstone, a third-round pick in the 1998 entry draft and this pick. Hartford relocated to Raleigh to become the Carolina Hurricanes after the 1996–97 NHL season.
3. Carolina's third-round pick went to Calgary as the result of a trade on March 5, 1997 that sent Steve Chiasson and a third-round pick in the 1997 entry draft to Hartford in exchange for Hnat Domenichelli, Glen Featherstone, a second-round pick in the 1998 Entry Draft and this pick. Hartford relocated to Raleigh to become the Carolina Hurricanes after the 1996–97 NHL season.
4. Carolina's seventh-round pick was re-acquired as the result of a trade with Philadelphia on December 15, 1996 that sent Paul Coffey and a third-round pick in the 1997 Entry Draft to Philadelphia in exchange for Kevin Haller, a first-round pick in the 1997 Entry Draft and this pick. (Hartford relocated to Raleigh to become the Carolina Hurricanes after the 1996–97 NHL season.)

== January ==
Date			References
January 4, 1996	To Edmonton Oilers Donald Dufresne; Jeff Norton	To St. Louis Blues Igor Kravchuk; Ken Sutton	
January 11, 1996	To Boston Bruins Bill Ranford	To Edmonton Oilers Mariusz Czerkawski rights to Sean Brown; 1st-rd pick – 1996 entry draft (# 19 – Matthieu Descoteaux)	
January 14, 1996	To Los Angeles Kings Steve Larouche	To New York Rangers Chris Snell	
January 21, 1996	To Montreal Canadiens Robert Dirk	To Mighty Ducks of Anaheim Jim Campbell	
January 23, 1996	To New York Islanders Ken Belanger; Bryan Berard; Martin Straka	To 3 team trade with Ottawa Senators and Toronto Maple Leafs	
January 23, 1996	To Ottawa Senators Wade Redden; Damian Rhodes	To 3 team trade with New York Islanders and Toronto Maple Leafs	
January 23, 1996	To Toronto Maple Leafs Don Beaupre; Kirk Muller	To 3 team trade with New York Islanders and Ottawa Senators	
January 23, 1996	To Philadelphia Flyers Dan Quinn	To Ottawa Senators cash	
January 25, 1996	To Colorado Avalanche rights to Brad Larsen	To Ottawa Senators Janne Laukkanen	
January 25, 1996	To Boston Bruins Rick Tocchet	To Los Angeles Kings Kevin Stevens	
January 28, 1996	To Toronto Maple Leafs Dave Gagner; 6th-rd pick – 1996 entry draft (# 140 – Dmytro Yakushyn)	To Dallas Stars Benoit Hogue; Randy Wood	
January 29, 1996	To Toronto Maple Leafs Mike Pomichter	To Ottawa Senators cash	
January 29, 1996	To St. Louis Blues Rob Pearson	To Washington Capitals Denis Chasse	

== February ==
Date			References
February 1, 1996	To Buffalo Sabres Bob Boughner	To Florida Panthers 3rd-rd pick – 1996 entry draft (# 60 – Chris Allen)	
February 2, 1996	To Chicago Blackhawks Danton Cole	To New York Islanders Bob Halkidis	
February 6, 1996	To Mighty Ducks of Anaheim Chris Herperger; 7th-rd pick – 1997 entry draft (# 178 – Tony Mohagen)	To Philadelphia Flyers Bob Corkum	
February 7, 1996	To Mighty Ducks of Anaheim Marc Chouinard; Teemu Selanne; 4th-rd pick – 1996 entry draft (MTL - # 92 – Kim Staal)^{1}	To Winnipeg Jets Chad Kilger; Oleg Tverdovsky; 3rd-rd pick – 1996 entry draft (# 95 – Per-Anton Lundstrom)	
February 10, 1996	To Los Angeles Kings Craig Ferguson	To Calgary Flames Pat Conacher	
February 15, 1996	To Buffalo Sabres Michal Grosek; Darryl Shannon	To Winnipeg Jets Craig Muni; 1st-rd pick – 1996 entry draft (# 24 – Daniel Briere)	
February 15, 1996	To Washington Capitals Stewart Malgunas	To Winnipeg Jets Denis Chasse	
February 17, 1996	To Los Angeles Kings Shane Churla; Doug Zmolek	To Dallas Stars Darryl Sydor; 5th-rd pick – 1996 entry draft (# 112 – Ryan Christie)	
February 26, 1996	To New Jersey Devils Phil Housley; Dan Keczmer	To Calgary Flames Tommy Albelin; Cale Hulse; Jocelyn Lemieux	
February 27, 1996	To Los Angeles Kings Craig Johnson; Patrice Tardif; Roman Vopat; 5th-rd pick – 1996 entry draft (# 123 – Peter Hogan); 1st-rd pick – 1997 entry draft (# 15 – Matt Zultek)	To St. Louis Blues Wayne Gretzky	
February 27, 1996	To Winnipeg Jets Dominic Roussel	To Philadelphia Flyers Tim Cheveldae; 3rd-rd pick – 1996 entry draft (# 64 – Chester Gallant)	
February 29, 1996	To Toronto Maple Leafs Nick Kypreos	To New York Rangers Bill Berg	
February 29, 1996	To Toronto Maple Leafs Wayne Presley	To New York Rangers Sergio Momesso	

1. Toronto's fourth-round pick went to Montreal as the result of a trade on April 6, 1995 that sent Paul DiPietro in exchange for this pick. At the time of the trade, it was for a conditional pick in the 1996 Entry Draft and the conditions of this draft pick are unknown.
  Toronto previously acquired this pick as the result of a trade on March 20, 1996 that sent Ken Baumgartner to Anaheim in exchange for this pick.

== March ==
- Trading Deadline: March 20, 1996

Date			References
March 1, 1996	To Pittsburgh Penguins Dave McLlwain	To Ottawa Senators 8th-rd pick – 1996 entry draft (# 212 – Erich Goldmann)	
March 8, 1996	To Mighty Ducks of Anaheim Mike Torchia	To Washington Capitals Todd Krygier	
March 8, 1996	To Boston Bruins Kevin Sawyer; Steve Staios	To St. Louis Blues Stephen Leach	
March 13, 1996	To New Jersey Devils Dave Andreychuk	To Toronto Maple Leafs 2nd-rd pick – 1996 entry draft (# 36 – Marek Posmyk); Toronto's option of a 4th-rd pick – 1998 entry draft or 3rd-rd pick – 1999 entry draft (NJD - # 95 – Andre Lakos)^{1}	
March 13, 1996	To Toronto Maple Leafs Wendel Clark; Mathieu Schneider; D.J. Smith	To New York Islanders Sean Haggerty; Darby Hendrickson; Kenny Jonsson; 1st-rd pick – 1997 entry draft (# 4 – Roberto Luongo)	
March 14, 1996	To Los Angeles Kings Ray Ferraro; Nathan LaFayette; Ian Laperriere; Mattias Norstrom; 4th-rd pick – 1997 entry draft (# 99 – Sean Blanchard)	To New York Rangers Shane Churla; Jari Kurri; Marty McSorley	
March 15, 1996	To Mighty Ducks of Anaheim Roman Oksiuta	To Vancouver Canucks Mike Sillinger	
March 15, 1996	To St. Louis Blues Craig MacTavish	To Philadelphia Flyers Dale Hawerchuk	
March 15, 1996	To Montreal Canadiens future considerations	To Washington Capitals Martin Brochu	
March 16, 1996	To San Jose Sharks 2nd-rd pick – 1996 entry draft (CHI - # 78 – Geoff Peters)^{2} 4th-rd pick – 1996 entry draft (# 102 – Matt Bradley)	To Florida Panthers Ray Sheppard; 4th-rd pick – 1996 entry draft (# 82 – Joey Tetarenko)	
March 18, 1996	To San Jose Sharks Darren Turcotte; 2nd-rd pick – 1996 entry draft (CHI - # 31 – Remi Royer)^{3}	To Winnipeg Jets Craig Janney	
March 19, 1996	To Philadelphia Flyers Kerry Huffman	To Ottawa Senators 9th-rd pick – 1996 entry draft (# 239 – Sami Salo)	
March 19, 1996	To Buffalo Sabres Denis Hamel	To St. Louis Blues Charlie Huddy; 7th-rd pick – 1996 entry draft (# 169 – Daniel Corso)	
March 19, 1996	To Mighty Ducks of Anaheim Anatoli Semenov rights to Mike Crowley	To Philadelphia Flyers Brian Wesenberg	
March 19, 1996	To Los Angeles Kings 4th-rd pick – 1996 entry draft (# 84 – Mikael Simons)	To Philadelphia Flyers John Druce; 7th-rd pick – 1997 entry draft (# 164 – Todd Fedoruk)	
March 19, 1996	To Calgary Flames Paxton Schulte	To Colorado Avalanche Vesa Viitakoski	
March 20, 1996	To San Jose Sharks 5th-rd pick – 1996 entry draft (BOS - # 132 – Elias Abrahamsson)^{4}	To Pittsburgh Penguins Kevin Miller	
March 20, 1996	To Los Angeles Kings Jaroslav Modry; 8th-rd pick – 1996 entry draft (# 190 – Stephen Valiquette)	To Ottawa Senators Kevin Brown	
March 20, 1996	To Buffalo Sabres 6th-rd pick – 1996 entry draft (# 161 – Darren Mortier)	To Colorado Avalanche Dave Hannan	
March 20, 1996	To Buffalo Sabres Jean-Luc Grand-Pierre; 2nd-rd pick – 1996 entry draft (# 27 – Cory Sarich); 3rd-rd pick – 1997 entry draft (# 69 – Maxim Afinogenov)	To St. Louis Blues Yuri Khmylev; 8th-rd pick – 1996 entry draft (# 196 – Andrej Podkonicky)	
March 20, 1996	To Edmonton Oilers Dan McGillis	To Detroit Red Wings Kirk Maltby	
March 20, 1996	To Vancouver Canucks Joey Kocur	To New York Rangers Kay Whitmore	
March 20, 1996	To St. Louis Blues 6th-rd pick – 1996 entry draft (# 159 – Stephen Wagner)	To Pittsburgh Penguins Jean-Jacques Daigneault	
March 20, 1996	To Vancouver Canucks Markus Naslund	To Pittsburgh Penguins Alek Stojanov	
March 20, 1996	To Vancouver Canucks Jesse Belanger	To Florida Panthers 3rd-rd pick – 1996 entry draft (# 65 – Oleg Kvasha)	
March 20, 1996	To Toronto Maple Leafs 4th-rd pick – 1996 entry draft (MTL - # 92 – Kim Staal)^{5}	To Mighty Ducks of Anaheim Ken Baumgartner	
March 20, 1996	To Chicago Blackhawks Enrico Ciccone; 2nd-rd pick – 1996 entry draft (# 42 – Jeff Paul)	To Tampa Bay Lightning Patrick Poulin; Igor Ulanov; 2nd-rd pick – 1996 entry draft (NJD - # 47 – Pierre Dagenais)^{6}	
March 20, 1996	To Chicago Blackhawks Ravil Gusmanov	To Winnipeg Jets 4th-rd pick – 1996 entry draft (TOR - # 103 – Vladimir Antipov)^{7}	
March 20, 1996	To Calgary Flames Bob Sweeney	To New York Islanders Pat Conacher; 6th-rd pick – 1997 entry draft (CGY - # 140 – Ilja Demidov)^{7}	

1. New Jersey's fourth-round pick was re-acquired as the result of a trade on February 25, 1997 that sent Jason Smith, Steve Sullivan and the rights to Alyn McCauley to Toronto in exchange Dave Ellett, Doug Gilmour and New Jersey's option of a fourth-round pick in the 1998 entry draft or third-round pick in the 1999 entry draft.
2. San Jose's second-round pick went to Chicago as the result of a trade on June 22, 1996 that sent a first-round pick in the 1996 entry draft to San Jose in exchange for a second-round pick in the 1996 entry draft and this pick.
3. San Jose's second-round pick went to Chicago as the result of a trade on June 22, 1996 that sent a first-round pick in the 1996 entry draft to San Jose in exchange for a second-round pick in the 1996 entry draft and this pick.
4. San Jose's fifth-round pick went to Boston as the result of a trade on June 21, 1996 that sent Al Iafrate to San Jose in exchange for Jeff Odgers and this pick.
5. Toronto's fourth-round pick went to Montreal as the result of a trade on April 6, 1995 that sent Paul DiPietro in exchange for this pick. At the time of the trade, it was for a conditional pick in the 1996 Entry Draft and the conditions of this draft pick are unknown.
6. Tampa Bay's second-round pick went to New Jersey as the result of a trade on June 22, 1996 that sent Corey Schwab to Tampa Bay in exchange for Jeff Reese, an eighth-round pick in the 1996 entry draft and this pick.
7. Arizona's' fourth-round pick went to Toronto as the result of a trade on June 22, 1996 that sent Mike Gartner to Arizona in exchange for this pick.
8. Calgary's sixth-round pick was re-acquired as the result of a trade on March 18, 1997 that sent Robert Reichel to the Islanders in exchange for Tyrone Garner, Marty McInnis and this pick.

== April ==
Date			References
April 3, 1996	To Colorado Avalanche 4th-rd pick – 1996 entry draft (# 98 – Ben Storey)	To Washington Capitals Anson Carter	

== See also ==
- 1995 NHL entry draft
- 1995 in sports
- 1996 in sports
