= 1995–96 Los Angeles Kings season =

National Hockey League team season

1995–96 Los Angeles Kings
- Division: 6th Pacific
- Conference: 12th Western
- 1995–96 record: 24–40–18
- Home record: 16–16–9
- Road record: 8–24–9
- Goals for: 256
- Goals against: 302

Team information
- General manager: Sam McMaster
- Coach: Larry Robinson
- Captain: Wayne Gretzky (Oct.–Feb.); Vacant (Feb.–Apr.)
- Alternate captains: Rob Blake; Jari Kurri (Oct.–Mar.); Rick Tocchet (Oct.–Jan.)
- Arena: Great Western Forum
- Average attendance: 13,551
- Minor league affiliates: Phoenix Roadrunners; Knoxville Cherokees; Richmond Renegades

Team leaders
- Goals: Dmitri Khristich (27)
- Assists: Wayne Gretzky (66)
- Points: Wayne Gretzky (81)
- Penalty minutes: Marty McSorley (148)
- Plus/minus: Kevin Todd (+6)
- Wins: Byron Dafoe (14)
- Goals against average: Jamie Storr (2.75)

The 1995–96 Los Angeles Kings season, was the Kings' 29th season in the National Hockey League (NHL). It involved Wayne Gretzky being traded to the St. Louis Blues. For the third consecutive year, the Kings failed to make the playoffs.

== Regular season ==
- February 27, 1996: Wayne Gretzky was traded from the Los Angeles Kings to the St. Louis Blues for Patrice Tardif, Craig Johnson, Roman Vopat, 1st round pick in the 1997 draft and a 5th round pick in the 1996 draft.

=== Final standings ===
Pacific Division
No.		GP	W	L	T	GF	GA	Pts
1	**Colorado Avalanche**	82	47	25	10	326	240	104
2	**Calgary Flames**	82	34	37	11	241	240	79
3	**Vancouver Canucks**	82	32	35	15	278	278	79
4	Mighty Ducks of Anaheim	82	35	39	8	234	247	78
5	Edmonton Oilers	82	30	44	8	240	304	68
6	Los Angeles Kings	82	24	40	18	256	302	66
7	San Jose Sharks	82	20	55	7	252	357	47

Note: GP = Games played; W = Wins; L = Losses; T = Ties; GF = Goals for; GA = Goals against; Pts = Points
Bolded teams qualified for the playoffs.

Western Conference
R		Div	GP	W	L	T	GF	GA	Pts
**1**	**p – Detroit Red Wings**	**CEN**	**82**	**62**	**13**	**7**	**325**	**181**	**131**
**2**	**Colorado Avalanche**	**PAC**	**82**	**47**	**25**	**10**	**326**	**240**	**104**
**3**	**Chicago Blackhawks**	**CEN**	**82**	**40**	**28**	**14**	**273**	**220**	**94**
**4**	**Toronto Maple Leafs**	**CEN**	**82**	**34**	**36**	**12**	**247**	**252**	**80**
**5**	**St. Louis Blues**	**CEN**	**82**	**32**	**34**	**16**	**219**	**248**	**80**
**6**	**Calgary Flames**	**PAC**	**82**	**34**	**37**	**11**	**241**	**240**	**79**
**7**	**Vancouver Canucks**	**PAC**	**82**	**32**	**35**	**15**	**278**	**278**	**79**
**8**	**Winnipeg Jets**	**CEN**	**82**	**36**	**40**	**6**	**275**	**291**	**78**
9	Mighty Ducks of Anaheim	PAC	82	35	39	8	234	247	78
10	Edmonton Oilers	PAC	82	30	44	8	240	304	68
11	Dallas Stars	CEN	82	26	42	14	227	280	66
12	Los Angeles Kings	PAC	82	24	40	18	256	302	66
13	San Jose Sharks	PAC	82	20	55	7	252	357	47

Divisions: CEN – Central, PAC – Pacific

bold – Qualified for playoffs; p – Won Presidents' Trophy

== Schedule and results ==
1995–96 regular season
October: 4–3–4 (home: 2–1–2; road: 2–2–2)

Game	Date	Score	Opponent	Record	Recap
1	October 7, 1995	4–2	Colorado Avalanche (1995–96)	1–0–0	W
2	October 10, 1995	6–5 OT	Chicago Blackhawks (1995–96)	2–0–0	W
3	October 12, 1995	7–7 OT	Vancouver Canucks (1995–96)	2–0–1	T
4	October 15, 1995	3–3 OT	@ Vancouver Canucks (1995–96)	2–0–2	T
5	October 18, 1995	1–1 OT	Philadelphia Flyers (1995–96)	2–0–3	T
6	October 20, 1995	7–4	@ Washington Capitals (1995–96)	3–0–3	W
7	October 21, 1995	3–2 OT	@ Pittsburgh Penguins (1995–96)	4–0–3	W
8	October 23, 1995	3–6	@ Montreal Canadiens (1995–96)	4–1–3	L
9	October 26, 1995	4–5	@ Ottawa Senators (1995–96)	4–2–3	L
10	October 28, 1995	2–2 OT	@ Toronto Maple Leafs (1995–96)	4–2–4	T
11	October 31, 1995	1–2	Calgary Flames (1995–96)	4–3–4	L

November: 7–7–1 (home: 5–2–0; road: 2–5–1)

Game	Date	Score	Opponent	Record	Recap
12	November 2, 1995	5–3	New York Rangers (1995–96)	5–3–4	W
13	November 4, 1995	2–4	New Jersey Devils (1995–96)	5–4–4	L
14	November 7, 1995	1–0	@ St. Louis Blues (1995–96)	6–4–4	W
15	November 8, 1995	3–3 OT	@ Dallas Stars (1995–96)	6–4–5	T
16	November 11, 1995	3–2	Pittsburgh Penguins (1995–96)	7–4–5	W
17	November 13, 1995	4–2	@ Mighty Ducks of Anaheim (1995–96)	8–4–5	W
18	November 14, 1995	5–6	Detroit Red Wings (1995–96)	8–5–5	L
19	November 16, 1995	9–2	New York Islanders (1995–96)	9–5–5	W
20	November 18, 1995	3–2	Florida Panthers (1995–96)	10–5–5	W
21	November 21, 1995	2–5	@ Philadelphia Flyers (1995–96)	10–6–5	L
22	November 22, 1995	2–5	@ New York Islanders (1995–96)	10–7–5	L
23	November 24, 1995	1–2	@ Boston Bruins (1995–96)	10–8–5	L
24	November 26, 1995	1–5	@ Florida Panthers (1995–96)	10–9–5	L
25	November 27, 1995	0–2	@ Tampa Bay Lightning (1995–96)	10–10–5	L
26	November 30, 1995	3–2	Washington Capitals (1995–96)	11–10–5	W

December: 3–5–4 (home: 3–2–3; road: 0–3–1)

Game	Date	Score	Opponent	Record	Recap
27	December 2, 1995	2–2 OT	Dallas Stars (1995–96)	11–10–6	T
28	December 6, 1995	6–3	Winnipeg Jets (1995–96)	12–10–6	W
29	December 9, 1995	1–2	St. Louis Blues (1995–96)	12–11–6	L
30	December 11, 1995	2–6	@ Calgary Flames (1995–96)	12–12–6	L
31	December 13, 1995	6–2	Ottawa Senators (1995–96)	13–12–6	W
32	December 16, 1995	3–6	Toronto Maple Leafs (1995–96)	13–13–6	L
33	December 20, 1995	2–2 OT	Vancouver Canucks (1995–96)	13–13–7	T
34	December 22, 1995	3–4	@ San Jose Sharks (1995–96)	13–14–7	L
35	December 23, 1995	2–2 OT	Colorado Avalanche (1995–96)	13–14–8	T
36	December 27, 1995	7–1	Mighty Ducks of Anaheim (1995–96)	14–14–8	W
37	December 29, 1995	4–5 OT	@ Edmonton Oilers (1995–96)	14–15–8	L
38	December 31, 1995	2–2 OT	@ Mighty Ducks of Anaheim (1995–96)	14–15–9	T

January: 3–8–2 (home: 2–2–1; road: 1–6–1)

Game	Date	Score	Opponent	Record	Recap
39	January 3, 1996	4–5	Winnipeg Jets (1995–96)	14–16–9	L
40	January 5, 1996	5–2	@ San Jose Sharks (1995–96)	15–16–9	W
41	January 6, 1996	7–5	San Jose Sharks (1995–96)	16–16–9	W
42	January 8, 1996	4–4 OT	@ Dallas Stars (1995–96)	16–16–10	T
43	January 10, 1996	4–5	@ Toronto Maple Leafs (1995–96)	16–17–10	L
44	January 12, 1996	2–3	@ Detroit Red Wings (1995–96)	16–18–10	L
45	January 14, 1996	2–5	@ Chicago Blackhawks (1995–96)	16–19–10	L
46	January 16, 1996	5–5 OT	Calgary Flames (1995–96)	16–19–11	T
47	January 22, 1996	1–3	@ New York Rangers (1995–96)	16–20–11	L
48	January 23, 1996	1–3	@ New Jersey Devils (1995–96)	16–21–11	L
49	January 25, 1996	2–8	@ Hartford Whalers (1995–96)	16–22–11	L
50	January 27, 1996	5–4	Mighty Ducks of Anaheim (1995–96)	17–22–11	W
51	January 31, 1996	4–6	Hartford Whalers (1995–96)	17–23–11	L

February: 1–9–4 (home: 1–4–1; road: 0–5–3)

Game	Date	Score	Opponent	Record	Recap
52	February 1, 1996	6–6 OT	@ San Jose Sharks (1995–96)	17–23–12	T
53	February 3, 1996	1–2	@ Calgary Flames (1995–96)	17–24–12	L
54	February 6, 1996	2–5	Chicago Blackhawks (1995–96)	17–25–12	L
55	February 8, 1996	4–3	Toronto Maple Leafs (1995–96)	18–25–12	W
56	February 10, 1996	1–6	San Jose Sharks (1995–96)	18–26–12	L
57	February 13, 1996	4–9	@ Detroit Red Wings (1995–96)	18–27–12	L
58	February 14, 1996	2–2 OT	@ Buffalo Sabres (1995–96)	18–27–13	T
59	February 17, 1996	1–2 OT	Mighty Ducks of Anaheim (1995–96)	18–28–13	L
60	February 19, 1996	3–3 OT	Boston Bruins (1995–96)	18–28–14	T
61	February 21, 1996	2–7	@ Edmonton Oilers (1995–96)	18–29–14	L
62	February 23, 1996	2–6	@ Colorado Avalanche (1995–96)	18–30–14	L
63	February 24, 1996	2–2 OT	@ St. Louis Blues (1995–96)	18–30–15	T
64	February 26, 1996	3–4	@ Winnipeg Jets (1995–96)	18–31–15	L
65	February 28, 1996	1–5	Tampa Bay Lightning (1995–96)	18–32–15	L

March: 4–6–2 (home: 2–4–1; road: 2–2–1)

Game	Date	Score	Opponent	Record	Recap
66	March 2, 1996	5–4	Montreal Canadiens (1995–96)	19–32–15	W
67	March 6, 1996	3–2	Edmonton Oilers (1995–96)	20–32–15	W
68	March 8, 1996	4–2	@ Chicago Blackhawks (1995–96)	21–32–15	W
69	March 10, 1996	2–3	@ Mighty Ducks of Anaheim (1995–96)	21–33–15	L
70	March 13, 1996	2–6	Buffalo Sabres (1995–96)	21–34–15	L
71	March 16, 1996	2–5	Edmonton Oilers (1995–96)	21–35–15	L
72	March 18, 1996	1–3	St. Louis Blues (1995–96)	21–36–15	L
73	March 20, 1996	2–5	Colorado Avalanche (1995–96)	21–37–15	L
74	March 23, 1996	4–4 OT	Dallas Stars (1995–96)	21–37–16	T
75	March 25, 1996	1–4	@ Vancouver Canucks (1995–96)	21–38–16	L
76	March 27, 1996	3–3 OT	@ Edmonton Oilers (1995–96)	21–38–17	T
77	March 29, 1996	4–3	@ Calgary Flames (1995–96)	22–38–17	W

April: 2–2–1 (home: 1–1–1; road: 1–1–0)

Game	Date	Score	Opponent	Record	Recap
78	April 3, 1996	2–2 OT	Detroit Red Wings (1995–96)	22–38–18	T
79	April 6, 1996	2–4	Vancouver Canucks (1995–96)	22–39–18	L
80	April 10, 1996	6–2	San Jose Sharks (1995–96)	23–39–18	W
81	April 12, 1996	3–5	@ Winnipeg Jets (1995–96)	23–40–18	L
82	April 14, 1996	5–4 OT	@ Colorado Avalanche (1995–96)	24–40–18	W

Legend: W Win (2 points) L Loss (0 points) T Tie (1 point)

== Player statistics ==
=== Scoring ===
- Position abbreviations: C = Center; D = Defense; G = Goaltender; LW = Left wing; RW = Right wing
- † = Joined team via a transaction (e.g., trade, waivers, signing) during the season. Stats reflect time with the Kings only.
- ‡ = Left team via a transaction (e.g., trade, waivers, release) during the season. Stats reflect time with the Kings only.

No.	Player	Pos	Regular season					
No.	Player	Pos	GP	G	A	Pts	+/-	PIM
99	Wayne Gretzky‡	C	62	15	66	81	−7	32
8	Dmitri Khristich	LW	76	27	37	64	0	44
43	Vitali Yachmenev	RW	80	19	34	53	−3	16
44	Yanic Perreault	C	78	25	24	49	−11	16
12	Kevin Todd	C	74	16	27	43	6	38
17	Jari Kurri‡	RW	57	17	23	40	−12	37
22	Rick Tocchet‡	RW	44	13	23	36	3	117
21	Tony Granato	RW	49	17	18	35	−5	46
28	Eric Lacroix	LW	72	16	16	32	−11	110
33	Marty McSorley‡	D	59	10	21	31	−14	148
26	Philippe Boucher	D	53	7	16	23	−26	31
13	Robert Lang	RW	68	6	16	22	−15	10
19	John Druce‡	RW	64	9	12	21	−26	14
27	John Slaney†	D	31	6	11	17	5	10
14	Gary Shuchuk	RW	33	4	10	14	3	12
25	Kevin Stevens†	LW	20	3	10	13	−11	22
2 (Note: Sydor wore number 25 until Stevens was acquired.)	Darryl Sydor‡	D	58	1	11	12	−11	34
77	Rob Cowie	D	46	5	5	10	−16	32
9	Vladimir Tsyplakov	LW	23	5	5	10	1	4
23	Craig Johnson†	RW	11	5	4	9	−4	6
15	Pat Conacher‡	C	35	5	2	7	−8	18
6	Sean O'Donnell	D	71	2	5	7	3	127
5	Aki Berg	D	51	0	7	7	−13	29
20	Ray Ferraro†	C	11	4	2	6	−13	10
24	Nathan LaFayette†	C	12	2	4	6	−3	6
3	Denis Tsygurov	D	18	1	5	6	0	22
29	Steven Finn†	D	50	3	2	5	−6	102
40	Barry Potomski	LW	33	3	2	5	−7	104
22	Ian Laperriere†	C	10	2	3	5	−2	15
3	Jan Vopat	D	11	1	4	5	3	4
4	Rob Blake	D	6	1	2	3	0	8
11 (Note: Churla wore number 72 in his first six games.)	Shane Churla†‡	RW	11	1	2	3	−9	37
20	Steve Larouche†	C	7	1	2	3	0	4
15	Jaroslav Modry†	D	9	0	3	3	−4	6
37	Patrice Tardif†	C	15	1	1	2	−9	37
7	Kevin Brown‡	RW	7	1	0	1	−2	4
55	Troy Crowder	RW	15	1	0	1	−3	42
2 (Note: Zmolek wore number 55 in his first two games.)	Doug Zmolek†	D	16	1	0	1	−6	22
35	Arto Blomsten	D	2	0	1	1	1	0
11	Mattias Norstrom†	D	11	0	1	1	−8	18
24	Michel Petit‡	D	9	0	1	1	−1	27
45	Ruslan Batyrshin	D	2	0	0	0	0	6
42	Dan Bylsma	LW	4	0	0	0	0	0
31	Byron Dafoe	G	47	0	0	0		6
32	Kelly Hrudey	G	36	0	0	0		4
34	Matt Johnson	LW	1	0	0	0	0	5
1	Jamie Storr	G	5	0	0	0		0

=== Goaltending ===
No.	Player	Regular season									
No.	Player	GP	W	L	T	SA	GA	GAA	SV%	SO	TOI
31	Byron Dafoe	47	14	24	8	1539	172	3.87	.888	1	2666
32	Kelly Hrudey	36	7	15	10	1214	113	3.26	.907	0	2077
1	Jamie Storr	5	3	1	0	147	12	2.75	.918	0	262

== Awards and records ==
=== Awards ===
Type	Award/honor	Recipient	Ref
League (in-season)	NHL All-Star Game selection	Wayne Gretzky (Note: Gretzky was voted to the starting lineup.)	
League (in-season)	NHL Rookie of the Month	Vitali Yachmenev (October)	
Team	Best Newcomer	Vitali Yachmenev	
Team	Bill Libby Memorial Award	Dmitri Khristich	
Team	Defensive Player	Kevin Todd	
Team	Jim Fox Community Service	Rob Blake	
Team	Jim Fox Community Service	Eric Lacroix	
Team	Leading Scorer	Dmitri Khristich	
Team	Most Inspirational	Tony Granato	
Team	Most Popular Player	Eric Lacroix	
Team	Outstanding Defenseman	Steven Finn	
Team	Unsung Hero	Steven Finn	

=== Milestones ===
Milestone	Player	Date	Ref
First game	Aki Berg	October 7, 1995	
First game	Vitali Yachmenev	October 7, 1995	
First game	Vladimir Tsyplakov	November 7, 1995	
First game	Dan Bylsma	December 13, 1995	
First game	Barry Potomski	January 6, 1996	
First game	Jan Vopat	March 16, 1996	
First game	Ruslan Batyrshin	April 3, 1996	

== Transactions ==
The Kings were involved in the following transactions during the 1995–96 season.

=== Trades ===
May 31, 1995	To Los Angeles Kings Jan Vopat	To Hartford Whalers 4th round pick in 1995 - Ian MacNeil
June 7, 1995	To Los Angeles Kings 5th round pick in 1995 - Jason Morgan	To Dallas Stars Jeff Mitchell
July 8, 1995	To Los Angeles Kings Byron Dafoe; Dmitri Khristich	To Washington Capitals 1st round pick in 1996 - Alexander Volchov; 4th round pick in 1996 - Justin Davis
November 13, 1995	To Los Angeles Kings Steven Finn	To Tampa Bay Lightning Michel Petit
December 28, 1995	To Los Angeles Kings John Slaney	To Colorado Avalanche 6th round pick in 1996 - Brian Willsie
January 14, 1996	To Los Angeles Kings Steve Larouche	To New York Rangers Chris Snell
January 25, 1996	To Los Angeles Kings Kevin Stevens	To Boston Bruins Rick Tocchet
February 10, 1996	To Los Angeles Kings Craig Ferguson	To Calgary Flames Pat Conacher
February 17, 1996	To Los Angeles Kings Shane Churla; Doug Zmolek	To Dallas Stars Darryl Sydor; 5th round pick in 1996 - Ryan Christie
February 27, 1996	To Los Angeles Kings Craig Johnson; Patrice Tardif; Roman Vopat; 5th round pick in 1996 - Peter Hogan; 1st round pick in 1997 - Matt Zultek	To St. Louis Blues Wayne Gretzky
March 14, 1996	To Los Angeles Kings Mattias Norstrom; Ray Ferraro; Ian Laperriere; Nathan LaFayette; 4th round pick in 1997 - Sean Blanchard	To New York Rangers Marty McSorley; Jari Kurri; Shane Churla
March 19, 1996	To Los Angeles Kings 4th round pick in 1996 - Mikael Simons	To Philadelphia Flyers John Druce; 7th round pick in 1997 - Todd Fedoruk
March 20, 1996	To Los Angeles Kings Jaroslav Modry; 8th round pick in 1996 - Steve Valiquette	To Ottawa Senators Kevin Brown

=== Free agent signings ===
August 30, 1995	From St. John's Maple Leafs (AHL) Steve Bancroft
September 12, 1995	From Phoenix Roadrunners (IHL) Nicholas Vachon

=== Free agents lost ===
July 14, 1995	To St. Louis Blues Grant Fuhr (2 years, $2.1 million)
July 17, 1995	To Chicago Wolves (IHL) Rob Brown
August 1, 1995	To Ottawa Senators Dan Quinn (2 years, $1.05 million)
August 25, 1995	To Chicago Blackhawks Andre Racicot
September 19, 1995	To Edmonton Oilers Rem Murray
October 4, 1995	To Buffalo Sabres Randy Burridge (1 year, $350,000)

=== Waivers ===
October 2, 1995	To Ottawa Senators Justin Hocking

== Draft picks ==
Los Angeles's draft picks at the 1995 NHL entry draft held at the Edmonton Coliseum in Edmonton, Alberta.

Round	#	Player	Nationality	College/Junior/Club team (League)
1	3	Aki Berg	Finland	TPS (Finland)
2	33	Donald MacLean	Canada	Beauport Harfangs (QMJHL)
2	50	Pavel Rosa	Czech Republic	HC Litvinov (Czech Republic)
3	59	Vladimir Tsyplakov	Belarus	Fort Wayne Komets (IHL)
5	118	Jason Morgan	Canada	Kingston Frontenacs (OHL)
6	137	Igor Melyakov	Russia	Torpedo Yaroslavl (Russia)
7	157	Benoit Larose	Canada	Sherbrooke Faucons (QMJHL)
7	163	Juha Vuorivirta	Finland	Tappara (Finland)
9	215	Brian Stewart	Canada	Sault Ste. Marie Greyhounds (OHL)
