= Vopat =

Vopat is a surname. Notable people with the surname include:

- Jan Vopat (born 1973), Czech ice hockey player
- Roman Vopat (born 1976), Czech ice hockey player, brother of Jan
