= Martin Špaňhel =

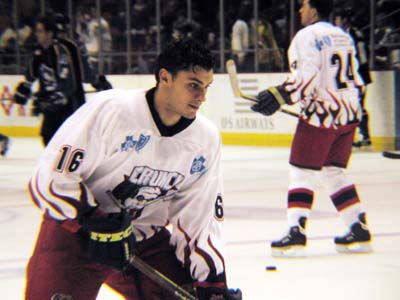
- Špaňhel with the Syracuse Crunch during the 2001–02 season
- Born: July 1, 1977 (age 49) Gottwaldov, Czechoslovakia
- Height: 6 ft 2 in (188 cm)
- Weight: 206 lb (93 kg; 14 st 10 lb)
- Position: Left wing
- Shot: Left
- Played for: HC Zlín; HC Plzeň; Columbus Blue Jackets; HC Sparta Praha; HIFK
- National team: Czech Republic
- NHL draft: 152nd overall, 1995; Philadelphia Flyers
- Playing career: 1995–2012

Martin Špaňhel (born July 1, 1977) is a Czech former professional ice hockey player who played in the National Hockey League (NHL). Credited with the first "unofficial" goal in Columbus Blue Jackets franchise history, scoring in a preseason game in Pittsburgh on September 15, he played 10 regular season games with Columbus during the team's first two seasons. Špaňhel currently is the Commissioner of the Columbus Adult Hockey League.

== Career statistics ==
=== Regular season and playoffs ===
			Regular season					Playoffs
Season	Team	League	GP	G	A	Pts	PIM	GP	G	A	Pts	PIM
1994–95	AC ZPS Zlín	CZE U20	33	25	16	41	—	—	—	—	—	—
1994–95	AC ZPS Zlín	ELH	1	0	0	0	0	—	—	—	—	—
1995–96	Moose Jaw Warriors	WHL	61	4	12	16	33	—	—	—	—	—
1996–97	AC ZPS Zlín	ELH	22	3	6	9	22	—	—	—	—	—
1997–98	HC ZPS–Barum Zlín	ELH	39	7	9	16	65	—	—	—	—	—
1998–99	HC Keramika Plzeň	ELH	49	12	12	24	60	5	2	1	3	8
1999–2000	HC Keramika Plzeň	ELH	52	21	27	48	98	7	1	4	5	12
2000–01	Columbus Blue Jackets	NHL	6	1	0	1	2	—	—	—	—	—
2000–01	Syracuse Crunch	AHL	67	11	13	24	75	2	0	0	0	8
2001–02	Columbus Blue Jackets	NHL	4	1	0	1	2	—	—	—	—	—
2001–02	Syracuse Crunch	AHL	50	7	12	19	43	—	—	—	—	—
2002–03	HC Sparta Praha	ELH	40	5	5	10	46	8	1	0	1	6
2003–04	HIFK	SM-l	36	2	11	13	22	—	—	—	—	—
2003–04	HC Lasselsberger Plzeň	ELH	14	1	2	3	20	12	2	2	4	10
2004–05	Lillehammer IK	NOR	17	9	8	17	56	3	2	1	3	2
2005–06	HC Sparta Praha	ELH	51	2	8	10	42	14	0	0	0	12
2006–07	Frederikshavn White Hawks	DEN	34	10	17	27	91	3	1	1	2	0
2007–08	Frederikshavn White Hawks	DEN	37	6	14	20	42	9	1	5	6	10
2008–09	Frederikshavn White Hawks	DEN	43	11	12	23	66	7	1	3	4	8
2011–12	Cincinnati Cyclones	ECHL	2	0	1	1	0	—	—	—	—	—
ELH totals			268	51	69	120	353	46	6	7	13	48
NHL totals			10	2	0	2	4	—	—	—	—	—
AHL totals			117	18	25	43	118	2	0	0	0	8

=== International ===
Year	Team	Event	GP	G	A	Pts	PIM
1995	Czech Republic	EJC	5	3	1	4	0
1997	Czech Republic	WJC	6	2	0	2	0
2000	Czech Republic	WC	9	1	1	2	10
Junior totals			11	5	1	6	0
Senior totals			9	1	1	2	10

== Transactions ==
- July 8, 1995 - Drafted by the Philadelphia Flyers in the 6th round, 152nd overall.
- November 13, 1995 - Traded with a 1st and 4th round draft pick to the San Jose Sharks for Pat Falloon.
- November 13, 1995 - Traded with Václav Varaďa and a 1st round pick for Doug Bodger.
- May 30, 2000 - Signed by the Columbus Blue Jackets as a free agent.
