= Sven Butenschön =

German-Canadian ice hockey player (born 1976)

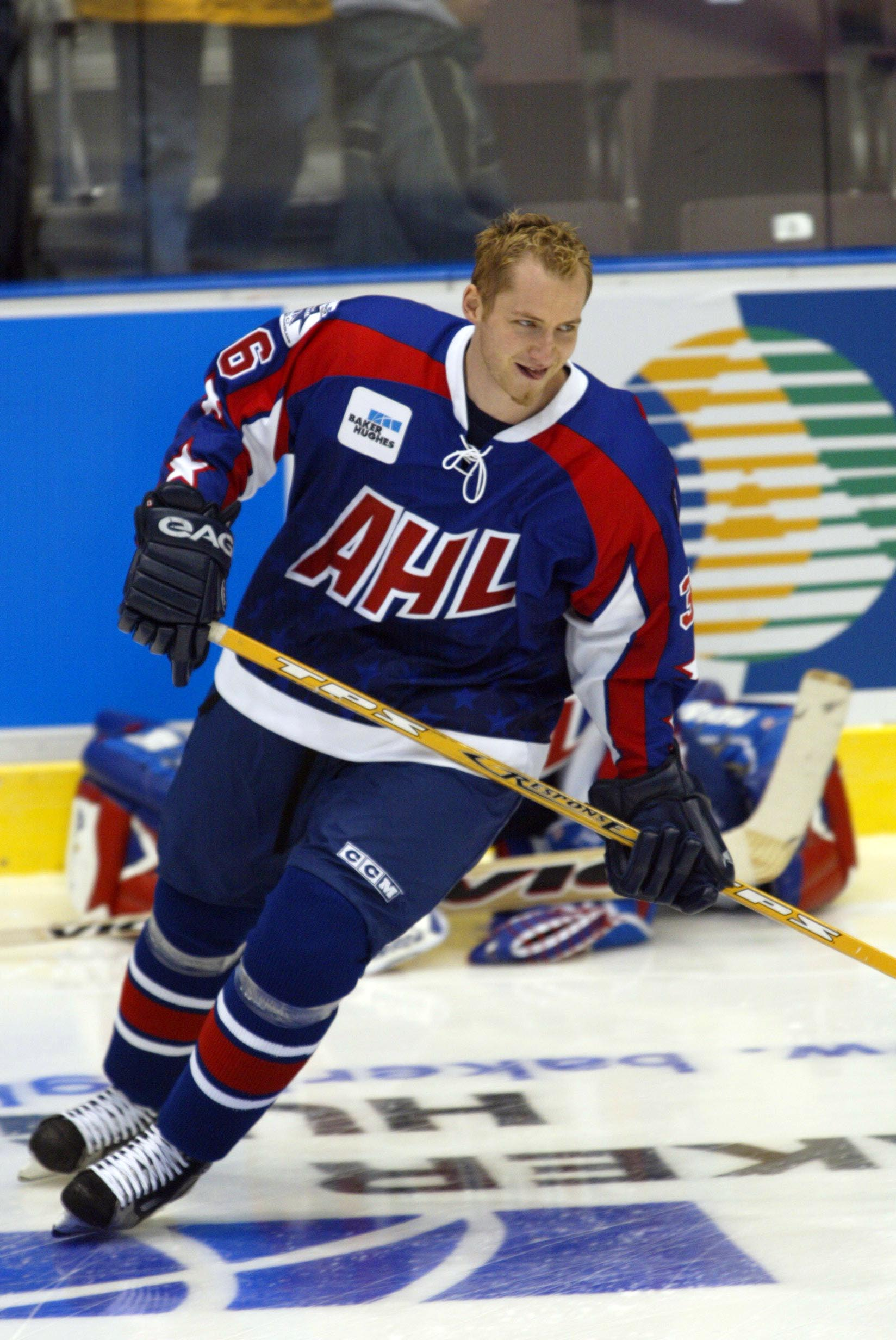
- Butenschön in 2002
- Born: March 22, 1976 (age 50) Itzehoe, West Germany
- Height: 6 ft 4 in (193 cm)
- Weight: 215 lb (98 kg; 15 st 5 lb)
- Position: Defence
- Shot: Left
- Played for: Pittsburgh Penguins; Edmonton Oilers; New York Islanders; Vancouver Canucks; Adler Mannheim; Thomas Sabo Ice Tigers
- National team: Germany
- NHL draft: 57th overall, 1994; Pittsburgh Penguins
- Playing career: 1996–2013

Sven Butenschön (born March 22, 1976) is a German-Canadian ice hockey coach and a former professional ice hockey defenceman who is currently serving as head coach at the University of British Columbia.

Butenschön has spent parts of eight seasons in the National Hockey League. He played several years in Germany and represented the German national team at two World Championships and the 2010 Olympic Games.

== Playing career ==
Born in Itzehoe, West Germany, Butenschön grew up in Winnipeg. His family had left Germany when he was two years of age. He played his junior hockey with the Brandon Wheat Kings of the WHL, and was drafted 57th overall by the Pittsburgh Penguins in the 1994 NHL entry draft. After two more seasons in Brandon, he turned pro in 1996 and spent his entire first professional season in the AHL with the Cleveland Lumberjacks.

Butenschön would spend five seasons in the Penguins organization, during which time he was usually the first callup from the farm when injuries hit, but was never able to establish himself as a regular. He made his NHL debut in 1997–98 campaign, appearing in 8 games for the Penguins without recording a point, and saw action in Pittsburgh in each of the next four seasons, including a high of 17 games in 1998–99. Primarily a defensive defender, he surprised with a big offensive season in the minors in 1999–2000, as he registered 19 goals and 40 points for the Wilkes-Barre/Scranton Penguins.

At the trade deadline near the end of the 2000–01 season, Butenschön was dealt to the Edmonton Oilers, and appeared in 7 games with the Oilers late in the season, recording his first NHL goal. However, he found himself back in the AHL for 2001–02, appearing in just 14 games for the Oilers.

In the summer of 2002, Butenschön was traded to the New York Islanders, where he would have the most successful portion of his career. In 2002–03, he played in a career-high 37 games for the Islanders, recording 4 assists. In 2003–04, he spent virtually the entire season in the NHL as the Islanders' 7th defender, playing in 41 games and recording 1 goal and 6 assists for a career high 7 points.

Butenschön signed with Adler Mannheim in the DEL during the 2004–05 NHL lockout, recording 1 goal and 6 points in 50 games. For 2005–06, he returned to North America, signing a one-year deal with the Vancouver Canucks. He enjoyed another fine season in the AHL, scoring 15 goals and 37 points for the Manitoba Moose, and appeared in 8 games for Vancouver.

Butenschön returned to Adler Mannheim when he became an unrestricted free agent in 2006, and recorded 3 goals and 6 points for the Eagles in 2006–07.

After five seasons in Mannheim, Butenschön signed with another German team, the Thomas Sabo Ice Tigers, on May 16, 2011. He spent two years with the Ice Tigers and retired after the 2012-13 season.

== International play ==
Butenschön made his debut on the German national team in November 2008 and played the 2009 and 2010 World Championships with the team, reaching the semi-final in 2010. He also made four appearances for Germany at the 2010 Olympic Games in Vancouver.

== Coaching career ==
Butenschön worked as lead instructor at Leslie Global Sports from 2013 to 2015.

In 2015, he joined the coaching staff of the University of British Columbia men's ice hockey team as an assistant and was promoted to the general manager and head coaching job in September 2016. He won Canada West Men’s Hockey Coach of the Year honours in 2018, 2024 and 2026.

== Career statistics ==
=== Regular season and playoffs ===
			Regular season					Playoffs
Season	Team	League	GP	G	A	Pts	PIM	GP	G	A	Pts	PIM
1991–92	Eastman Selects AAA	MMHL	36	2	10	12	110	—	—	—	—	—
1992–93	Eastman Selects AAA	MMHL	35	14	22	36	101	—	—	—	—	—
1993–94	Brandon Wheat Kings	WHL	70	3	19	22	51	4	0	0	0	6
1994–95	Brandon Wheat Kings	WHL	21	1	5	6	44	18	1	2	3	11
1995–96	Brandon Wheat Kings	WHL	70	4	37	41	99	19	1	12	13	18
1996–97	Cleveland Lumberjacks	IHL	75	3	12	15	68	10	0	1	1	4
1997–98	Syracuse Crunch	AHL	65	14	23	37	66	5	1	2	3	0
1997–98	Pittsburgh Penguins	NHL	8	0	0	0	6	—	—	—	—	—
1998–99	Pittsburgh Penguins	NHL	17	0	0	0	6	—	—	—	—	—
1998–99	Houston Aeros	IHL	57	1	4	5	81	—	—	—	—	—
1999–2000	Wilkes–Barre/Scranton Penguins	AHL	75	19	21	40	101	—	—	—	—	—
1999–2000	Pittsburgh Penguins	NHL	3	0	0	0	0	—	—	—	—	—
2000–01	Wilkes–Barre/Scranton Penguins	AHL	55	7	28	35	85	—	—	—	—	—
2000–01	Pittsburgh Penguins	NHL	5	0	1	1	2	—	—	—	—	—
2000–01	Edmonton Oilers	NHL	7	1	1	2	2	—	—	—	—	—
2001–02	Hamilton Bulldogs	AHL	61	9	35	44	88	—	—	—	—	—
2001–02	Edmonton Oilers	NHL	14	0	0	0	4	—	—	—	—	—
2002–03	Bridgeport Sound Tigers	AHL	36	3	13	16	58	9	3	6	9	6
2002–03	New York Islanders	NHL	37	0	4	4	26	—	—	—	—	—
2003–04	New York Islanders	NHL	41	1	6	7	30	4	0	0	0	0
2003–04	Bridgeport Sound Tigers	AHL	5	0	1	1	4	—	—	—	—	—
2004–05	Adler Mannheim	DEL	50	1	5	6	54	14	0	1	1	16
2005–06	Manitoba Moose	AHL	60	15	22	37	30	13	0	6	6	12
2005–06	Vancouver Canucks	NHL	8	0	0	0	10	—	—	—	—	—
2006–07	Adler Mannheim	DEL	42	3	3	6	34	11	1	3	4	12
2007–08	Adler Mannheim	DEL	54	0	6	6	42	5	1	1	2	6
2008–09	Adler Mannheim	DEL	49	2	7	9	44	9	1	0	1	32
2009–10	Adler Mannheim	DEL	53	1	12	13	65	2	0	0	0	0
2010–11	Adler Mannheim	DEL	33	1	0	1	22	6	0	2	2	0
2011–12	Thomas Sabo Ice Tigers	DEL	49	6	6	12	26	—	—	—	—	—
2012–13	Thomas Sabo Ice Tigers	DEL	50	2	1	3	64	3	1	0	1	0
AHL totals			354	67	146	213	432	27	4	14	18	18
NHL totals			140	2	12	14	86	4	0	0	0	0
DEL totals			380	16	40	56	351	50	4	7	11	66

=== International ===
Year	Team	Event	Result	GP	G	A	Pts	PIM
2009	Germany	OGQ	Q	3	0	0	0	0
2009	Germany	WC	15th	6	0	2	2	2
2010	Germany	OG	11th	4	0	0	0	2
2010	Germany	WC	4th	7	0	0	0	2
Senior totals				20	0	2	2	6

== Awards and honors ==
Award	Year
IHL
Turner Cup (Houston Aeros)	1999
AHL
All-Star Game	2002, 2006
DEL
Champion (Adler Mannheim)	2007

== Transactions ==
- On June 29, 1994 the Pittsburgh Penguins drafted Butenschön in the third round (#57 overall) of the 1994 NHL draft.
- On March 13, 2001 the Pittsburgh Penguins traded Butenschön to the Edmonton Oilers in exchange for Dan LaCouture.
- On July 9, 2002 the Florida Panthers signed Butenschön as an unrestricted free agent.
- On October 11, 2002 the Florida Panthers traded Butenschön to the New York Islanders in exchange for Juraj Kolnik and a 2003 ninth-round pick (#276-Carter Lee).
- On August 2, 2004 the Adler Mannheim signed Butenschön as a free agent.
- On August 22, 2005 the Vancouver Canucks signed Butenschön as an unrestricted free agent.
- On June 19, 2006 the Adler Mannheim signed Butenschön as a free agent.

== See also ==
- List of German Canadians

Awards and achievements
Preceded by John Slaney; Stephen Leach; Tyler Wright	Captain of the Wilkes-Barre/Scranton Penguins; 2000-01 (shared with); John Slaney	Succeeded by Jason MacDonald
