= Tyler Wright =

Canadian ice hockey player (born 1973)

- Born: April 6, 1973 (age 53) Canora, Saskatchewan, Canada
- Height: 5 ft 11 in (180 cm)
- Weight: 190 lb (86 kg; 13 st 8 lb)
- Position: Centre
- Shot: Right
- Played for: Edmonton Oilers; Pittsburgh Penguins; Columbus Blue Jackets; Mighty Ducks of Anaheim; EHC Basel
- National team: Canada
- NHL draft: 12th overall, 1991; Edmonton Oilers
- Playing career: 1992–2007

Tyler Wright (born April 6, 1973) is a Canadian former professional ice hockey player. He played in 613 NHL games with the Edmonton Oilers, Pittsburgh Penguins, Columbus Blue Jackets, and Mighty Ducks of Anaheim. His most recent job in the NHL was as director of Player Personnel /director of amateur scouting for the Edmonton Oilers. Wright and the Oilers announced they agreed to mutually part ways on August 23, 2023.

Wright was born in Canora, Saskatchewan, but grew up in Kamsack, Saskatchewan.

== Playing career ==
Wright was drafted 12th overall in the 1991 NHL entry draft by the Edmonton Oilers. As a junior with the Swift Current Broncos in 1989-90 he scored 32 points as a rookie. In 1990-91, he improved his offensive production, scoring 41 goals and 92 points in 66 games. In the 1991-92 season, he netted 36 goals and 82 points in 63 games.

After being drafted by the Oilers, Wright played parts of two seasons in Edmonton (1992–93 and 1993–94) but ultimately spent most of his time with their AHL team, Cape Breton Oilers.

On June 22, 1996, Wright was acquired by the Pittsburgh Penguins for a 7th-round draft pick (Brandon Lafrance) and subsequently played 45 games with the Penguins during the 1996-97 season, registering 2 goals and 2 assists. In 1997-98, he joined the NHL ranks full-time and played all 82 games for the Penguins. He helped his team win the Northeast Division title and then made his playoff debut.

In 1998-99, he played 61 regular-season games for the Penguins going scoreless, giving him the NHL record for most games played in a single season without registering a point (since tied by Raitis Ivanans). The following year he dressed for 50 games and scored 12 goals and 22 points. In the 1999 playoffs, he scored four points in eleven games as the Penguins reached the second round. On April 21, he scored his first career playoff goal against the Washington Capitals.

On June 23, 2000, Wright was selected in the 2000 NHL Expansion Draft by the newly formed Columbus Blue Jackets. In his first season with his new team, he scored 16 goals and 32 points and developed into an on ice leader for the Blue Jackets. Since 1987–88, there have been 94 hat tricks scored by a goal (i) at even strength, (ii) on the power play, and (iii) on the penalty kill, by a total of 75 different players. Wright scored two of these 94 hat tricks, with the first coming on March 16, 2001, against the Atlanta Thrashers and his second coming on October 27, 2002, against the Los Angeles Kings.

During the NHL lockout, Wright played with Swiss team EHC Biel in the second Swiss division.

After four seasons in Columbus, Wright was dealt to the Mighty Ducks of Anaheim on November 15, 2005, in a deal that saw Sergei Fedorov join the Blue Jackets. The final year of his contract was bought out by Anaheim in June 2006.

== International play ==
Medal record

Representing Canada

Ice hockey

World Junior Championships
Gold medal – first place	1993 Gävle	

On the international stage, Wright represented Canada at the 1992 and 1993 World Junior Championships. At the 1993 tournament, he was an alternate captain and helped Canada win the gold medal and was a member of Canada's World Championship team in 2002.

== Post-retirement ==
In July 2007, Wright rejoined the Columbus Blue Jackets organization in a front office position when he was named a development coach for the club. His duties included working with prospects and young players throughout the organization, and assisting with the development of prospects within the professional minor leagues, various major junior leagues, and college level.

On July 1, 2013, Wright resigned from the Blue Jackets. On July 10, 2013, he was named the director of amateur scouting for the Detroit Red Wings. On July 11, 2019, it was announced that Wright would depart the Detroit Red Wings and join new GM Ken Holland in Edmonton. The two previously worked together for the last six seasons with the Detroit Red Wings. On August 22, 2023 it was announced the Tyler Wright and the Edmonton Oilers had parted ways.

== Career statistics ==
=== Regular season and playoffs ===
			Regular season					Playoffs
Season	Team	League	GP	G	A	Pts	PIM	GP	G	A	Pts	PIM
1989–90	Swift Current Broncos	WHL	67	14	18	32	119	4	0	0	0	12
1990–91	Swift Current Broncos	WHL	66	41	51	92	157	3	0	0	0	6
1991–92	Swift Current Broncos	WHL	63	36	46	82	295	8	2	5	7	16
1992–93	Swift Current Broncos	WHL	37	24	41	65	76	17	9	17	26	49
1992–93	Edmonton Oilers	NHL	7	1	1	2	19	—	—	—	—	—
1993–94	Cape Breton Oilers	AHL	65	14	27	41	160	5	2	0	2	11
1993–94	Edmonton Oilers	NHL	5	0	0	0	4	—	—	—	—	—
1994–95	Cape Breton Oilers	AHL	70	16	15	31	184	—	—	—	—	—
1994–95	Edmonton Oilers	NHL	6	1	0	1	14	—	—	—	—	—
1995–96	Cape Breton Oilers	AHL	31	6	12	18	158	—	—	—	—	—
1995–96	Edmonton Oilers	NHL	23	1	0	1	33	—	—	—	—	—
1996–97	Cleveland Lumberjacks	IHL	10	4	3	7	34	14	4	2	6	44
1996–97	Pittsburgh Penguins	NHL	45	2	2	4	70	—	—	—	—	—
1997–98	Pittsburgh Penguins	NHL	82	3	4	7	112	6	0	1	1	4
1998–99	Pittsburgh Penguins	NHL	61	0	0	0	90	13	0	0	0	19
1999–00	Wilkes–Barre/Scranton Penguins	AHL	25	5	15	20	86	—	—	—	—	—
1999–00	Pittsburgh Penguins	NHL	50	12	10	22	45	11	3	1	4	17
2000–01	Columbus Blue Jackets	NHL	76	16	16	32	140	—	—	—	—	—
2001–02	Columbus Blue Jackets	NHL	77	13	11	24	100	—	—	—	—	—
2002–03	Columbus Blue Jackets	NHL	70	19	11	30	113	—	—	—	—	—
2003–04	Columbus Blue Jackets	NHL	68	9	9	18	63	—	—	—	—	—
2004–05	EHC Biel	NLB	7	3	4	7	4	12	8	8	16	44
2005–06	Columbus Blue Jackets	NHL	18	0	4	4	20	—	—	—	—	—
2005–06	Mighty Ducks of Anaheim	NHL	25	2	2	4	31	—	—	—	—	—
2006–07	EHC Basel	NLA	4	0	0	0	4	—	—	—	—	—
NHL totals			613	79	70	149	854	41	6	3	9	57

=== International ===
Year	Team	Event	Result	GP	G	A	Pts	PIM
1992	Canada	WJC	6th	7	1	0	1	16
1993	Canada	WJC	1st place, gold medalist(s)	7	3	3	6	6
2002	Canada	WC	6th	7	0	2	2	33
Junior totals				14	4	3	7	22
Senior totals				7	0	2	2	33

Awards and achievements
Preceded by Scott Allison	Edmonton Oilers first-round draft pick 1991 (first of two)	Succeeded by Martin Ručinský
Preceded by Position Created	Captain of the Wilkes-Barre/Scranton Penguins; 1999-00 (shared with); John Slaney; Stephen Leach	Succeeded by John Slaney; Sven Butenschon
