= Václav Varaďa =

Czech ice hockey player

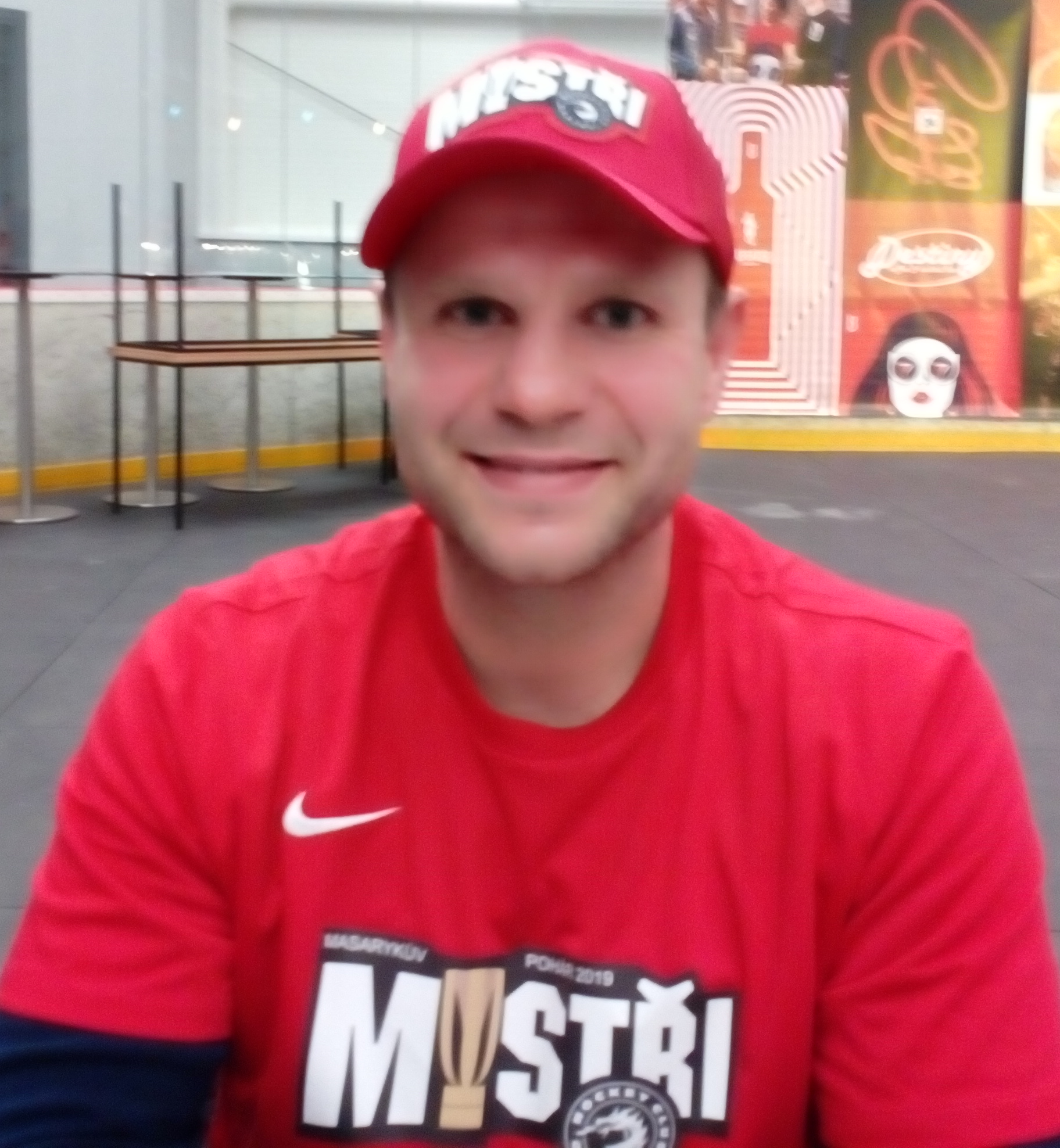
- Václav Varaďa
- Born: April 26, 1976 (age 50) Vsetín, Czechoslovakia
- Height: 6 ft 0 in (183 cm)
- Weight: 208 lb (94 kg; 14 st 12 lb)
- Position: Right wing
- Shot: Left
- Played for: Buffalo Sabres; Ottawa Senators
- National team: Czech Republic
- NHL draft: 89th overall, 1994; San Jose Sharks
- Playing career: 1992–2014

Václav Varaďa (Czech pronunciation: [ˈvaːtslaf ˈvaraɟa]; born April 26, 1976) is a Czech former professional ice hockey player and current coach. He formerly played in the National Hockey League (NHL) in a ten-year span. In his professional career, he has previously played for the Buffalo Sabres and the Ottawa Senators. Varaďa was known for his physicality in a third or fourth line role.

== Playing career ==
Varaďa spent his young years with the Czech League from 1992 to 1994, and that year he became drafted. To get closer to earn a spot in the NHL, Varaďa moved up to the Western Hockey League (WHL), and then the NHL's affiliate, the American Hockey League (AHL). He was traded to the Buffalo Sabres in a deal for Doug Bodger, to Varaďa's original team, the San Jose Sharks. Rotating from the AHL for a few years, he created a reputation as a pest and a solid checking line player.

He played some of his best hockey for the Buffalo Sabres during their trip to the Stanley Cup finals. Despite the large help of Dominik Hašek, the Sabres lost to the Dallas Stars in six games by a controversial goal by winger Brett Hull.

He was later traded to the Ottawa Senators for Jakub Klepiš before the 2003 trade deadline in an attempt by the Senators to become a tougher and gritty team, en route to the Senators' first Eastern Conference championship series against the defensive-minded team, New Jersey Devils. In a dramatic seven game series, New Jersey came out on top to eventually win the Stanley Cup.

After spending his career with the Vítkovice of the Czech League during the 2004–05 NHL lockout, Varaďa spent one more year with the Senators. In a game against the Toronto Maple Leafs, Varaďa was ready to check defenceman Carlo Colaiacovo skating down to the Senators' end. Varaďa collided with him, then Colaiacovo spun into the boards, hard enough for a concussion. After taken off by a stretcher, there were fans complaining about an intent to injure, especially with Colaiacovo's history of serious injuries. However, video has shown Colaiacovo was skating hard enough to actually rebound off Varaďa.

Once the playoffs came for the heavily-favoured Senators, the team fell to the Sabres in a five-game series, with Varaďa only totaling two assists. In August 2006, Varaďa signed with HC Davos of the Swiss National League A (NLA).

== Career statistics ==
=== Regular season and playoffs ===
			Regular season					Playoffs
Season	Team	League	GP	G	A	Pts	PIM	GP	G	A	Pts	PIM
1991–92	HC Kopřivnice	CSSR U18	29	37	10	47	—	—	—	—	—	—
1992–93	TJ Vítkovice	CSSR	1	0	0	0	0	—	—	—	—	—
1993–94	HC Vítkovice	ELH	26	6	8	14	12	3	1	0	1	4
1994–95	Tacoma Rockets	WHL	68	50	38	88	108	4	4	3	7	11
1995–96	Kelowna Rockets	WHL	59	39	46	85	100	6	3	3	6	16
1995–96	Buffalo Sabres	NHL	1	0	0	0	0	—	—	—	—	—
1995–96	Rochester Americans	AHL	5	3	0	3	4	—	—	—	—	—
1996–97	Buffalo Sabres	NHL	5	0	0	0	2	—	—	—	—	—
1996–97	Rochester Americans	AHL	53	23	25	48	81	10	1	6	7	27
1997–98	Buffalo Sabres	NHL	27	5	6	11	15	15	3	4	7	18
1997–98	Rochester Americans	AHL	45	30	26	56	74	—	—	—	—	—
1998–99	Buffalo Sabres	NHL	72	7	24	31	61	21	5	4	9	14
1999–00	HC Vítkovice	ELH	5	2	3	5	12	—	—	—	—	—
1999–00	Buffalo Sabres	NHL	76	10	27	37	62	5	0	0	0	8
2000–01	Buffalo Sabres	NHL	75	10	21	31	81	13	0	4	4	8
2001–02	Buffalo Sabres	NHL	76	7	16	23	82	—	—	—	—	—
2002–03	Buffalo Sabres	NHL	44	7	4	11	23	—	—	—	—	—
2002–03	Ottawa Senators	NHL	11	2	6	8	8	18	2	4	6	18
2003–04	Ottawa Senators	NHL	30	5	5	10	26	7	1	1	2	4
2004–05	HC Vítkovice	ELH	44	8	19	27	83	11	3	3	6	35
2005–06	Ottawa Senators	NHL	76	5	16	21	50	8	0	2	2	12
2006–07	HC Davos	NLA	25	6	4	10	26	—	—	—	—	—
2007–08	SC Langnau	NLA	37	12	20	32	56	—	—	—	—	—
2008–09	HC Vítkovice Steel	ELH	16	5	5	10	22	4	2	2	4	2
2009–10	HC Vítkovice Steel	ELH	19	2	8	10	12	—	—	—	—	—
2009–10	HC Kometa Brno	ELH	14	4	4	8	10	—	—	—	—	—
2010–11	HC Oceláři Třinec	ELH	51	12	25	37	42	18	2	9	11	38
2011–12	HC Oceláři Třinec	ELH	16	6	7	13	20	5	0	2	2	4
2011–12	HC Slovan Ústečtí Lvi	CZE.2	—	—	—	—	—	5	2	0	2	4
2012–13	HC Oceláři Třinec	ELH	51	14	23	37	60	10	3	1	4	10
2013–14	HC Oceláři Třinec	ELH	36	4	5	9	28	1	0	0	0	0
ELH totals			278	63	107	170	301	52	11	17	28	93
NHL totals			493	58	125	183	410	87	11	19	30	82

=== International ===
Year	Team	Event	GP	G	A	Pts	PIM
1994	Czech Republic	EJC	5	3	3	6	6
1995	Czech Republic	WJC	7	6	4	10	25
1996	Czech Republic	WJC	6	5	1	6	8
2000	Czech Republic	WC	9	2	4	6	6
2005	Czech Republic	WC	9	1	0	1	2
Junior totals			18	14	8	22	39
Senior totals			18	3	4	7	8
