= Steve Leach =

American ice hockey player and coach

- Born: January 16, 1966 (age 60) Cambridge, Massachusetts, U.S.
- Height: 5 ft 11 in (180 cm)
- Weight: 197 lb (89 kg; 14 st 1 lb)
- Position: Right wing
- Shot: Right
- Played for: Washington Capitals; Boston Bruins; St. Louis Blues; Carolina Hurricanes; Ottawa Senators; Phoenix Coyotes; Pittsburgh Penguins
- National team: United States
- NHL draft: 34th overall, 1984; Washington Capitals
- Playing career: 1986–2000

Steve Leach
Medal record

Representing United States

Ice hockey

World Junior Championships
Bronze medal – third place	1986 Hamilton, Ontario	

Stephen Morgan Leach (born January 16, 1966) is an American ice hockey coach and former professional ice hockey player. He is currently the head coach of the Valley Jr. Warriors '99 Elite squad. He is the uncle of Jay Leach.

== Playing career ==
As a youth, Leach played in the 1979 Quebec International Pee-Wee Hockey Tournament with the Boston Braves minor ice hockey team.

Leach was raised in Lexington, Massachusetts and played his high school hockey at Matignon High School, where he transferred to as a sophomore. He won three consecutive Massachusetts HS hockey titles from 1982 to 1984. His older brother Chris played D1 hockey at St. Lawrence. Selected by the Washington Capitals in the second round of the 1984 NHL Draft, Leach played for the Capitals for parts of six seasons. It was during his time with the Capitals that he would also be a member of the U.S. Olympic Hockey Team that participated in the 1988 Winter Olympic Games.

Prior to the 1991–92 NHL season Leach was traded to the Boston Bruins in exchange for Randy Burridge. He would also play for the St. Louis Blues, Carolina Hurricanes, Ottawa Senators, Phoenix Coyotes, and Pittsburgh Penguins before retiring in 2000.

== Career statistics ==
=== Regular season and playoffs ===
			Regular season					Playoffs
Season	Team	League	GP	G	A	Pts	PIM	GP	G	A	Pts	PIM
1982–83	Matignon High School	HS-MA	23	17	21	38		—	—	—	—	—
1983–84	Matignon High School	HS-MA	21	27	22	49	49	—	—	—	—	—
1984–85	University of New Hampshire	HE	41	12	25	37	53	—	—	—	—	—
1985–86	University of New Hampshire	HE	25	22	6	28	30	—	—	—	—	—
1985–86	Washington Capitals	NHL	11	1	1	2	2	6	0	1	1	0
1986–87	Binghamton Whalers	AHL	54	18	21	39	39	13	3	1	4	6
1986–87	Washington Capitals	NHL	15	1	0	1	6	—	—	—	—	—
1987–88	United States	Intl	49	26	20	46	30	—	—	—	—	—
1987–88	Washington Capitals	NHL	8	1	1	2	17	9	2	1	3	0
1988–89	Washington Capitals	NHL	74	11	19	30	94	6	1	0	1	12
1989–90	Washington Capitals	NHL	70	18	14	32	104	14	2	2	4	8
1990–91	Washington Capitals	NHL	68	11	19	30	99	9	1	2	3	8
1991–92	Boston Bruins	NHL	78	31	29	60	147	15	4	0	4	10
1992–93	Boston Bruins	NHL	79	26	25	51	126	4	1	1	2	2
1993–94	Boston Bruins	NHL	42	5	10	15	74	5	0	1	1	2
1994–95	Boston Bruins	NHL	35	5	6	11	68	—	—	—	—	—
1995–96	Boston Bruins	NHL	59	9	13	22	86	—	—	—	—	—
1995–96	St. Louis Blues	NHL	14	2	4	6	22	11	3	2	5	10
1996–97	St. Louis Blues	NHL	17	2	1	3	24	6	0	0	0	33
1997–98	Carolina Hurricanes	NHL	45	4	5	9	42	—	—	—	—	—
1998–99	Ottawa Senators	NHL	9	0	2	2	6	—	—	—	—	—
1998–99	Springfield Falcons	AHL	13	5	3	8	10	—	—	—	—	—
1998–99	Phoenix Coyotes	NHL	22	1	1	2	37	7	1	1	2	2
1999–2000	Pittsburgh Penguins	NHL	56	2	3	5	24	—	—	—	—	—
1999–2000	Wilkes–Barre/Scranton Penguins	AHL	4	2	3	5	4	—	—	—	—	—
2000–01	Louisville Panthers	AHL	2	0	1	1	0	—	—	—	—	—
NHL totals			702	130	153	283	978	92	15	11	26	87

=== International ===
Year	Team	Event	GP	G	A	Pts	PIM
1984	United States	WJC	7	2	0	2	4
1985	United States	WJC	7	2	0	2	12
1986	United States	WJC	7	6	5	11	4
1988	United States	OG	6	1	2	3	0
Junior totals			21	10	5	15	20

== Awards and honors ==
Award	Year
All-Hockey East Rookie Team	1984–85

Awards and achievements
Preceded by Position Created	Captain of the Wilkes-Barre/Scranton Penguins; 1999–00 (shared with); John Slaney; Tyler Wright	Succeeded by John Slaney; Sven Butenschon
