= John Slaney =

Canadian ice hockey player

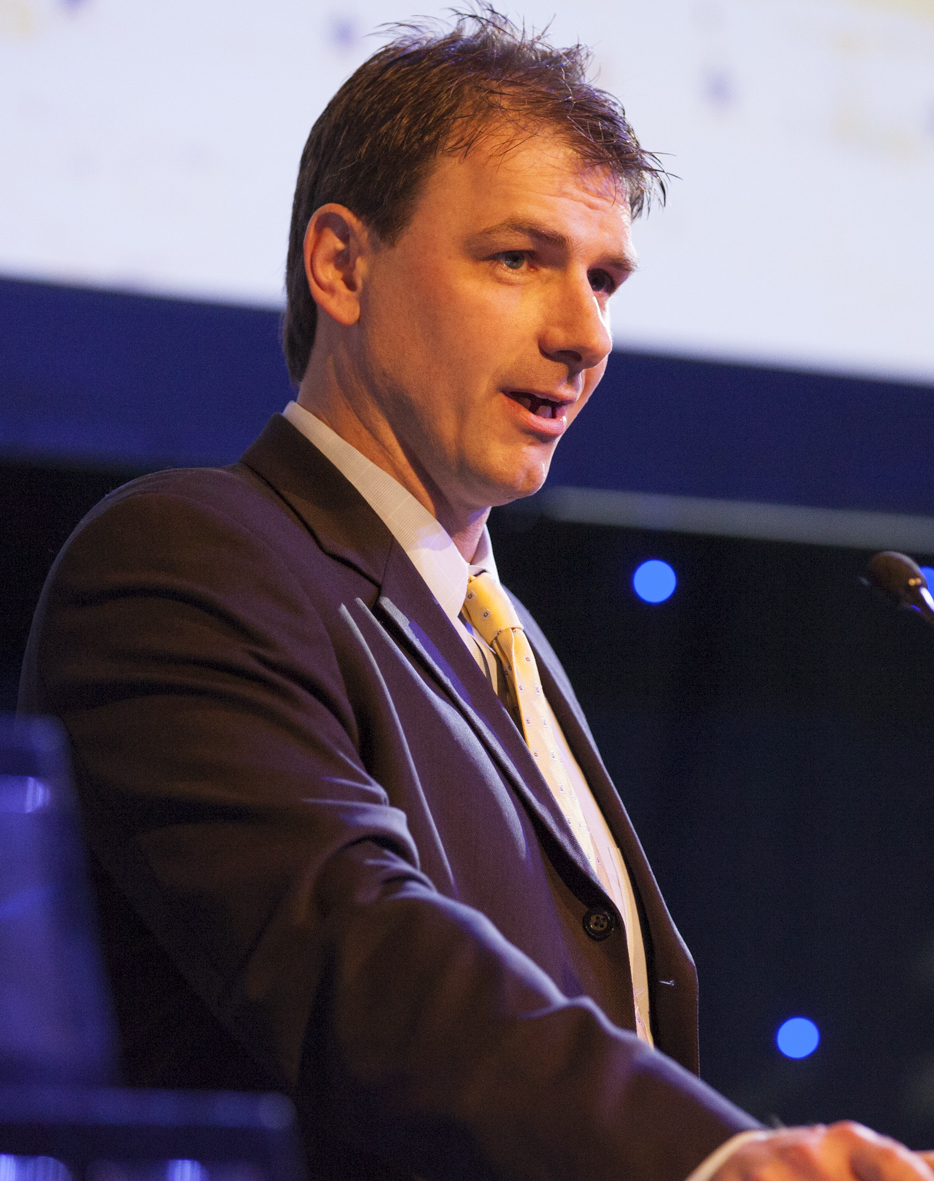
- Slaney in 2014
- Born: February 7, 1972 (age 54) St. John's, Newfoundland, Canada
- Height: 6 ft 0 in (183 cm)
- Weight: 189 lb (86 kg; 13 st 7 lb)
- Position: Defence
- Shot: Left
- Played for: Washington Capitals; Colorado Avalanche; Los Angeles Kings; Phoenix Coyotes; Nashville Predators; Pittsburgh Penguins; Philadelphia Flyers
- NHL draft: 9th overall, 1990; Washington Capitals
- Playing career: 1992–2011

John G. Slaney (born February 7, 1972) is a Canadian former professional ice hockey defenceman. He is currently an assistant coach for the Tucson Roadrunners of the American Hockey League (AHL). He was formerly the assistant coach of the Portland Pirates of the AHL. Slaney was the first player born and raised in Newfoundland and Labrador to be a first-round NHL draft pick.

== Early life ==
Slaney was born on February 7, 1972, in St. John's, Newfoundland and Labrador, Canada, to parents Joe and Helen. His father ran a barber shop while also raising Slaney and his four older siblings.

== Playing career ==
=== Amateur ===
Slaney played midget hockey in St. John's, Newfoundland until 1988 when he was drafted into the Ontario Hockey League (OHL). As a 15-year-old, Slaney scored 41 goals and 69 assists through 61 games with the St. John's Capitals U18 AAA team. His scoring abilities garnered attention from scouts. He was the youngest player chosen for Team Atlantic at the U17 Esso Cup. Slaney was subsequently drafted in the first round of the 1988 OHL draft by the Cornwall Royals. Although it was later revealed that Slaney announced he would only play for the Royals. Slaney quickly earned praise from his Royals teammates and coaches at training camp, despite members of the media raising concerns about his size. Slaney began the 1988–89 season with two goals and six assists through his first seven games. He was also named the Royals' Star of the Game through his first two games with the team, despite them both being losses. By December, Slaney had improved to nine goals and 32 points in 33 games. He finished his rookie season with 16 goals and 43 assists for 59 points and was named the team's Most Sportmanlike Player and Scholastic Player of the Year.

He spent the offseason working with weights and began the Royals' 1989 training camp weighing 186 pounds. As a sophomore, he was expected to replace Mathieu Schneider as the team's best defenseman. In December, Slaney and teammate Owen Nolan tried out for Team Canada's junior team roster to compete at the 1989 World Junior Ice Hockey Championships, but were two of the final cuts. Slaney and Nolan were also selected to represent Team OHL in the annual OHL/QMJHL Challenge Cup. Upon rejoining the Royals, Slaney continued to lead all defencemen in scoring with 18 goals and 44 points. While the NHL Central Scouting Bureau originally ranked him as a second round pick in the 1990 NHL entry draft, Slaney climbed the ranks as the season progressed. He was ranked 23rd overall by the Scouting Bureau in February, but finished the season ranked seventh overall. Slaney was named the recipient of the 1990 Max Kaminsky Trophy as the best defenceman across the OHL at the end of his sophomore campaign. He was then awarded the CHL Defenceman of the Year Award, and selected for the First All-Star Team.

Slaney was eventually drafted 9th overall by the Washington Capitals in the first round of the NHL Entry Draft. While Keith Brown was the first NHL player from Newfoundland to be drafted, Slaney was the first born and raised Newfounder to be an NHL first-rounder. Slaney attended the Capitals 1990 training camp, where he impressed the team's coaching staff and was considered for their final roster. While he was eventually cut, the Capitals gave Slaney a tryout with their American Hockey League (AHL) affiliate, the Baltimore Skipjacks, during their preseason. He played one game with the team before returning to the Royals for the 1990–91 season. On November 30, 1990, Slaney signed a three-year $200,000 entry-level contract with the Capitals. Shortly after signing the contract, Slaney was one of 32 players named to Team Canada's national junior team tryout camp. Despite suffering from an ankle injury, Slaney attended the camp and made the final team.

Slaney scored the game-winning goal for Team Canada at the 1991 World Junior Ice Hockey Championships to lead the team to a gold medal. He injured his ankle while scoring the goal and had to leave the game, but returned to the ice for their post-win celebrations. Slaney returned to the Royals lineup following the tournament but suffered a lower-body injury in his second game back on January 6. While he was originally expected to miss two to three weeks with a charley horse, it became more serious than expected. It was later discovered that he had a blood clot in his right leg. Slaney underwent months of daily physiotherapy to recover, as he was originally unable to bend his leg beyond 20 degrees. He returned to the ice on February 28 after missing two months of game play, and quickly scored 10 points through his first four games. Despite missing significant time during the season, Slaney was named to the OHL's Second All-Star Team.

During the 1991 offseason, Slaney joined the Capitals fitness staff in Maryland and trained an intensive strength-building program under their guidance. He participated in the Capitals' 1991 training camp but was returned to the Royals for the 1991–92 season. Slaney played in two games for the Royals, recording five points, before suffering a shoulder injury in a game against the London Knights. The Royals struggled in his absence and won only one of eight games in November before he returned to the lineup at the end of the month. At the end of February, Slaney scored his 259th and 260th OHL point to pass Mike Stapleton for fourth place on the OHL's all-time scoring list. However, shortly thereafter, he suffered a hamstring injury and missed almost every game in March to recover. He returned to the Royals lineup for their final game of the regular season and played in their playoff series against the Ottawa 67's.

=== Professional ===
Once the Royals were eliminated from playoff contention, Slaney was reassigned to the Baltimore Skipjacks for the remainder of their 1991–92 season. He scored his first professional goal with the Skipjacks on March 28, 1992, in a 3–3 tie with the Hershey Bears.

Slaney participated in the Capitals' 1992 training camp but was reassigned to the Skipjacks for the 1992–93 season. He recorded his first professional multi-goal game on March 1, 1993, against the Moncton Hawks. By the end of the month, Slaney led all AHL defensemen with 18 goals and 45 assists for 63 points.

Upon returning to the AHL for the 1993–94 season, Slaney again led the team in scoring but also voiced frustration over not being called up to the NHL. By mid-November, Slaney ranked second on the team in scoring with 18 points in 21 games. After three teammates were called up instead of him, he said, "they (the organization) keep saying stick with it and you'll get your chance, won't believe it until I put the (Capitals) jersey on." He eventually earned his first NHL call-up on December 8, 1993, and made his NHL debut on December 11, against the Montreal Canadiens. Slaney scored his first NHL goal on December 21 against the Philadelphia Flyers.

Slaney finished the 1994-95 season with three goals and 10 assists in eight games with Portland and three assists through 16 games with the Capitals. Following the 1994-95 season, Slaney was traded to the Colorado Avalanche in exchange for a third-round pick in the 1996 NHL entry draft. After a poor training camp, Slaney skated in seven of the Avalanche's first 37 games. He scored three assists through seven games with the Avalanche before being traded to the Los Angeles Kings in December 1995. Upon joining the Kings, Slaney was reunited with his junior hockey coach Marc Crawford, who was the head coach of the team, and recorded four assists through his first 14 games. He missed 12 games with a broken hand before returning to the Kings' lineup in mid-April.

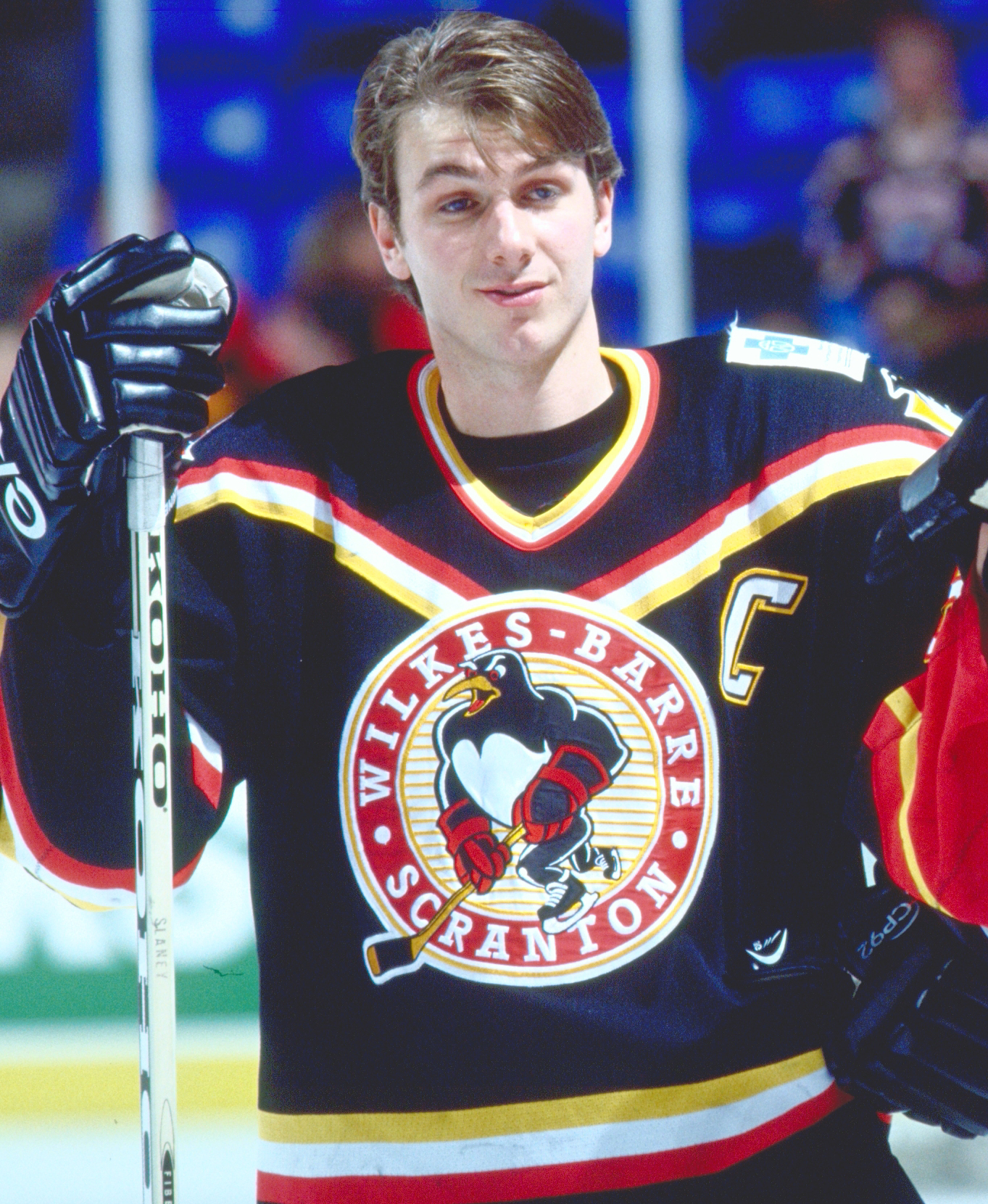
Slaney with the Wilkes-Barre/Scranton Penguins.

Slaney signed a one-year contract with the Phoenix Coyotes before the start of the 1997–98 season. He started the season with the Coyotes AHL affiliate, the Las Vegas Thunder, but was recalled to the NHL level on October 17. Despite suffering from a charley horse in his left thigh, Slaney led all Coyotes defensemen in scoring with one goal and six assists through November 12. As a result, Coyotes General Manager Bobby Smith extended Slaney's three-year contract by another year.

At the end of September 1999, Slaney signed a contract with the Pittsburgh Penguins for the 1999–2000 season. After playing in eight games for the Pittsburgh Penguins, Slaney was reassigned to their AHL affiliate, the Wilkes–Barre/Scranton Penguins. He scored three points in his debut with the team on November 5, 1999, and finished the month with seven goals and five assists. As such, he was named the Wilkes–Barre/Scranton Penguins Player of the Month for November. In December, Slaney was moved from defence to centre by team coach Glenn Patrick and he scored 20 goals and 24 assists. He was recalled to the NHL level numerous times through January and February. Slaney was named the AHL Player of the Week on April 9, 2000, after recording four goals and one assist through four games.

Slaney returned to the Wilkes–Barre/Scranton Penguins for the 2000–01 season as the team's full-time captain. While he started the season with six assists through eight games, his first goal of the season only came at the end of the month on October 28. Slaney continued his scoring streak into November and quickly tied Bobby House for the league lead in scoring with 19 points. He was recognized as the AHL Player of the Week on November 6 after collecting one goal and eight assists through three games. His offensive capabilities helped the Penguins improve their win streak to eight games and gain sole possession of first place in the AHL's Western Conference and MidAtlantic Division. The Penguins continued their unbeaten streak through November before it was broken by the St. John's Maple Leafs at a franchise-record 13 games on November 19. Despite the Pittsburgh Penguins roster being depleted due to injuries during this time, Slaney remained in the AHL. By mid-December, Slaney was tied for second in league scoring among defencemen with six goals and 29 assists. As such, he was one of four Penguins chosen to represent the team at the 2001 AHL All-Star Classic. Despite suffering a hip flexor injury before the tournament, Slaney still competed in the All-Star Game. However, moments before the skills competition was set to begin, it was announced to fans in the arena that Slaney had been traded to the Philadelphia Flyers organization for Kevin Stevens. Slaney had known since that morning, after hearing rumours a few days before. He scored a goal and two assists during the All-Star Game and was named the All-Star Game's MVP. A member of the local media later reported that "in some ways, the 2001 AHL All-Star Game was less about the game than it was a John Slaney farewell tour."

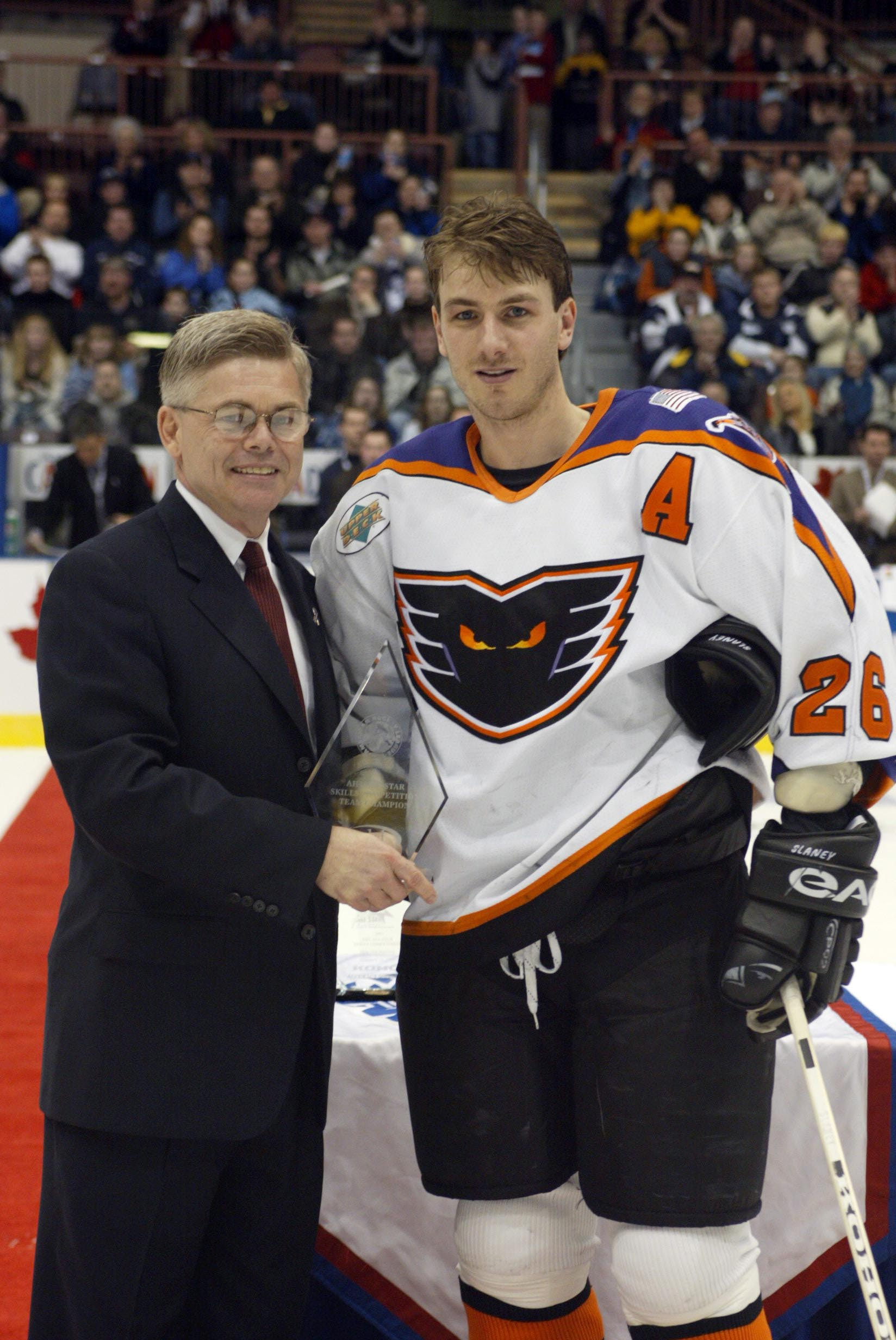
Slaney with the Philadelphia Phantoms in 2002.

Following the All-Star Game, the Philadelphia Phantoms reported that Slaney would not play for the team until he recovered from a hip flexor injury. He underwent double hernia surgery in January and was expected to miss at least three weeks of gameplay to recover. He eventually made his debut for the Phantoms on February 13 against his former team, the Wilkes–Barre/Scranton Penguins. Despite stating he was not back to perfect health, Slaney recorded one assist in the Phantoms' 5–3 win. Slaney finished the regular season ranked second among all AHL defencemen with 18 goals and 47 assists. As such, he received the Eddie Shore Award as the AHL's Defenseman of the Year and was named a First-Team All-Star.

Despite missing more than five weeks due to an injury, Slaney finished the 2001–02 regular season with 20 goals and 39 assists through 62 games. As such, he became the third player in AHL history to win the Eddie Shore Award in two consecutive seasons.

Before the start of the 2005–06 season, Slaney was named the seventh captain in the Philadelphia Phantoms franchise history. On December 30, 2005, Slaney became the all-time leading scorer among defencemen in AHL history with 454 points. He subsequently received the CCM/AHL Milestone of the Month award for December. Slaney recorded his 300th career AHL assist on January 8, 2006, against the Lowell Lock Monsters. Shortly thereafter, he was named a starter for the 2006 AHL All-Star Classic in Winnipeg. Slaney re-signed with the Phantoms at the end of the 2005–06 season.

On January 21, 2007, Slaney became the first defenseman in AHL history to reach 500 points in his AHL career. He scored the milestone point, an assist, during the Phantoms' 4-3 overtime loss to the Norfolk Admirals. He subsequently received the CCM/AHL Milestone of the Month award for January. Slaney then played in hhis 600th career AHL game on February 2, 2007.

== Coaching career ==
Following his retirement, Slaney joined the Portland Pirates as an assistant coach in 2011. During this time, Slaney was inducted into the Newfoundland and Labrador Hockey Hall of Fame in 2014. After spending four years in this role, Slaney was promoted to assistant coach of the Arizona Coyotes in 2015. Slaney was named an assistant coach for the Tucson Roadrunners on July 26, 2017, after serving two seasons as an assistant coach with the Arizona Coyotes.

== Records ==
- Until overtaken in 2011, was the all-time leading scorer among defencemen in AHL history.

== Personal life ==
Slaney and his wife Brenda have two children together.

== Career statistics ==
=== Regular season and playoffs ===
			Regular season					Playoffs
Season	Team	League	GP	G	A	Pts	PIM	GP	G	A	Pts	PIM
1988–89	Cornwall Royals	OHL	66	16	43	59	23	18	8	16	24	10
1989–90	Cornwall Royals	OHL	64	38	59	97	60	6	0	8	8	11
1990–91	Cornwall Royals	OHL	34	21	25	46	28	—	—	—	—	—
1991–92	Cornwall Royals	OHL	34	19	41	60	43	6	3	8	11	0
1991–92	Baltimore Skipjacks	AHL	6	2	4	6	0	—	—	—	—	—
1992–93	Baltimore Skipjacks	AHL	79	20	46	66	60	7	0	7	7	8
1993–94	Washington Capitals	NHL	47	7	9	16	27	11	1	1	2	2
1993–94	Portland Pirates	AHL	29	14	13	27	17	—	—	—	—	—
1994–95	Portland Pirates	AHL	8	3	10	13	4	7	1	3	4	4
1994–95	Washington Capitals	NHL	16	0	3	3	6	—	—	—	—	—
1995–96	Cornwall Aces	AHL	5	0	4	4	2	—	—	—	—	—
1995–96	Colorado Avalanche	NHL	7	0	3	3	4	—	—	—	—	—
1995–96	Los Angeles Kings	NHL	31	6	11	17	10	—	—	—	—	—
1996–97	Phoenix Roadrunners	IHL	35	9	25	34	8	—	—	—	—	—
1996–97	Los Angeles Kings	NHL	32	3	11	14	4	—	—	—	—	—
1997–98	Las Vegas Thunder	IHL	5	2	2	4	10	—	—	—	—	—
1997–98	Phoenix Coyotes	NHL	55	3	14	17	24	—	—	—	—	—
1998–99	Nashville Predators	NHL	46	2	12	14	14	—	—	—	—	—
1998–99	Milwaukee Admirals	IHL	7	0	1	1	0	—	—	—	—	—
1999–2000	Wilkes–Barre/Scranton Penguins	AHL	49	30	30	60	25	—	—	—	—	—
1999–2000	Pittsburgh Penguins	NHL	29	1	4	5	10	2	1	0	1	2
2000–01	Wilkes–Barre/Scranton Penguins	AHL	40	12	38	50	4	—	—	—	—	—
2000–01	Philadelphia Phantoms	AHL	25	6	11	17	10	10	2	6	8	6
2001–02	Philadelphia Phantoms	AHL	64	20	39	59	26	5	2	1	3	0
2001–02	Philadelphia Flyers	NHL	1	0	0	0	0	1	0	0	0	0
2002–03	Philadelphia Phantoms	AHL	55	9	33	42	36	—	—	—	—	—
2003–04	Philadelphia Phantoms	AHL	59	19	29	48	31	12	3	4	7	6
2003–04	Philadelphia Flyers	NHL	4	0	2	2	0	—	—	—	—	—
2004–05	Philadelphia Phantoms	AHL	78	14	30	44	39	21	3	7	10	12
2005–06	Philadelphia Phantoms	AHL	79	8	42	50	60	—	—	—	—	—
2006–07	Philadelphia Phantoms	AHL	55	9	24	33	26	—	—	—	—	—
2007–08	Kölner Haie	DEL	53	6	27	33	40	9	1	5	6	8
2008–09	Frankfurt Lions	DEL	52	11	16	27	44	5	0	2	2	4
2009–10	Frankfurt Lions	DEL	44	4	20	24	18	4	0	1	1	2
2010–11	HC Plzeň 1929	ELH	29	3	8	11	24	4	0	0	0	2
AHL totals			631	166	353	519	340	62	11	28	39	36
NHL totals			268	22	69	91	99	14	2	1	3	4

=== International ===
Medal record

Representing Canada

Ice hockey

World Junior Championships
Gold medal – first place	1991 Saskatchewan	

Year	Team	Event	Result	GP	G	A	Pts	PIM
1991	Canada	WJC	1st place, gold medalist(s)	7	1	2	3	6
1992	Canada	WJC	6th	7	1	3	4	6
Junior totals				14	2	5	7	12

== Awards and honours ==
Award	Year
OHL
First All-Star Team	1989–90
Max Kaminsky Trophy	1989–90
CHL Defenceman of the Year	1989–90
Second All-Star Team	1990–91
AHL
All-Star Game	2000, 2001, 2002, 2003, 2006
First All-Star Team	2000–01, 2001–02
Eddie Shore Award	2000–01, 2001–02
Second All-Star Team	2003–04
Calder Cup (Philadelphia Phantoms)	2005
Hall of Fame	2014
Newfoundland and Labrador
Male Athlete of the Year	1992
Hockey Hall of Fame	2014

Awards and achievements
Preceded by Olaf Kölzig	Washington Capitals first-round draft pick 1990	Succeeded by Pat Peake
Preceded by Position created	Captain of the Wilkes-Barre/Scranton Penguins; 1999-01 (shared with); Stephen Leach (1999-00); Tyler Wright (1999-00); Sven Butenschon (2000–01)	Succeeded by Jason MacDonald
