= Doug Bodger =

Canadian ice hockey player (born 1966)

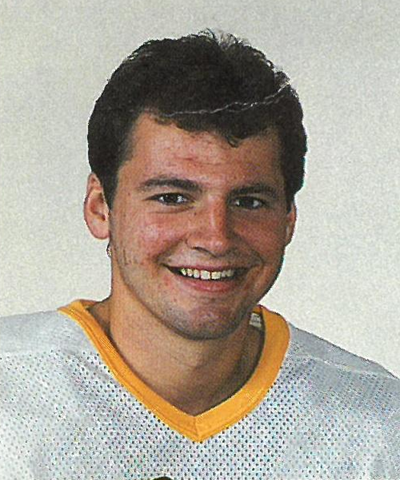
- Born: June 18, 1966 (age 60) Chemainus, British Columbia, Canada
- Height: 6 ft 2 in (188 cm)
- Weight: 215 lb (98 kg; 15 st 5 lb)
- Position: Defence
- Shot: Left
- Played for: Pittsburgh Penguins; Buffalo Sabres; San Jose Sharks; New Jersey Devils; Los Angeles Kings; Vancouver Canucks
- National team: Canada
- NHL draft: 9th overall, 1984; Pittsburgh Penguins
- Playing career: 1984–2000

Douglas Paul Bodger (born June 18, 1966) is a Canadian former professional ice hockey defenceman in the National Hockey League. Selected by the Pittsburgh Penguins ninth overall in the 1984 NHL Draft he would play in over 1,000 games in the NHL, primarily with the Buffalo Sabres, but also had longer tenures with the Penguins and San Jose Sharks, while having short stints with the New Jersey Devils, Los Angeles Kings, and Vancouver Canucks at the end of his professional career.

A standout junior player in the Western Hockey League, Bodger was twice named the best defenceman on the Kamloops Junior Oilers. He was also named a WHL all-star in both his junior seasons. He also represented Canada at three World Championships, winning a silver medal at the 1996 tournament.

== Playing career ==
Bodger played his minor hockey with the Cowichan Midget Capitals before joining the Kamloops Junior Oilers of the Western Hockey League. In his first season with Kamloops, he scored 26 goals and 92 points, being named to the WHL Second All-Star Team. The following season, Bodger scored 21 goals and added 77 assists for 98 points, earning First All-Star Team honours. Both seasons he was named the team's top defenceman. With 190 points in two seasons of junior hockey, Bodger was one of the top prospects going into the 1984 NHL entry draft, being ranked the seventh greatest prospect by the NHL Central Scouting Bureau.

As a top prospect, Bodger was expecting to be selected early in the draft. He had earlier conversations with the Detroit Red Wings, who told Bodger there was a "90 per cent chance" they would pick him at seventh overall, going so far as to ask he wear a red tie to match the team colours. However, the Red Wings instead chose Shawn Burr. Instead, the Pittsburgh Penguins made Bodger their second choice of the draft; they had selected Mario Lemieux, who would become one of the greatest players in NHL history, first overall.

Bodger made his NHL debut alongside Lemieux on October 11, 1984, against the Boston Bruins. A shoulder separation limited his first season to 65 games, in which he had 5 goals and 26 assists. Bodger cited Lemieux, who led the team with 100 points, for helping him earn a lot of assists. The next season, he appeared in 79 games, scoring 37 points.

Starting the 1988–89 season with the Penguins, Bodger was traded along with Darrin Shannon to the Buffalo Sabres on November 12, 1988, for Tom Barrasso and a third-round draft choice in the 1990 draft. He played 61 games with the Sabres that season, scoring 7 goals and 40 assists, to make a total of 8 goals and 44 assists for the entire year. Bodger would become a mainstay in Buffalo and spent the next seven years patrolling the Sabres blue line before a 1995-96 trade sent him to San Jose, during that recording a career high 54 points (9 goals, 45 assists) in 81 games in 1992–93. Bodger played parts of three seasons with the Sharks and was then dealt to the New Jersey Devils. In 1998, he played the final playoff games of his career as a Devil and then got traded to the Los Angeles Kings in the off-season. Following his year as a King, Bodger became a free agent and contemplated retirement but eventually signed as free agent with the Vancouver Canucks; bringing him home to British Columbia. Bodger would play 13-games with the Canucks, recording a single assist before deciding to retire on December 14, 1999, with the Vancouver Canucks as the highest scoring defenceman from British Columbia.

== Off the ice ==
Bodger has a wife, Tracy, and two children, son Ryne and daughter Rachel.

In 2006, he was inducted into the British Columbia Hockey Hall of Fame.

== International play ==
Doug Bodger
Medal record

Representing Canada

Men's ice hockey

World Championships
| Silver medal – second place | 1996 Austria | Ice hockey |

Bodger played for Canada at three World Championships, in 1987, 1996, and 1999. Joining the Canadian national team for the first time in 1987, Bodger played in all ten games, scoring one goal and one assist as Canada finished fourth in the tournament. His next appearance in the World Championships was in 1996. In eight games, Bodger contributed three assists and was named the team's best defenceman as Canada won the silver medal. His third and final appearance for the national team was at the 1999 World Championships, where he scored three assists in ten games for the fourth place Canadians.

== Awards ==
=== WHL ===
| Award | Year |
|---|---|
| WHL Second All-Star Team | 1983 |
| WHL West First All-Star Team | 1984 |

== Career statistics ==
=== Regular season and playoffs ===
| | | | Regular season | | | | | Playoffs |
| Season | Team | League | GP | G | A | Pts | PIM | GP | G | A | Pts | PIM |
|---|---|---|---|---|---|---|---|---|---|---|---|---|
| 1981–82 | Cowichan Valley Capitals | Bantam | — | — | — | — | — | — | — | — | — | — |
| 1982–83 | Kamloops Junior Oilers | WHL | 72 | 26 | 66 | 92 | 98 | 7 | 0 | 5 | 5 | 2 |
| 1983–84 | Kamloops Junior Oilers | WHL | 70 | 21 | 77 | 98 | 90 | 17 | 2 | 15 | 17 | 12 |
| 1983–84 | Kamloops Junior Oilers | MC | — | — | — | — | — | 4 | 0 | 1 | 1 | 2 |
| 1984–85 | Pittsburgh Penguins | NHL | 65 | 5 | 26 | 31 | 67 | — | — | — | — | — |
| 1985–86 | Pittsburgh Penguins | NHL | 79 | 4 | 33 | 37 | 63 | — | — | — | — | — |
| 1986–87 | Pittsburgh Penguins | NHL | 76 | 11 | 38 | 49 | 52 | — | — | — | — | — |
| 1987–88 | Pittsburgh Penguins | NHL | 69 | 14 | 31 | 45 | 103 | — | — | — | — | — |
| 1988–89 | Pittsburgh Penguins | NHL | 10 | 1 | 4 | 5 | 7 | — | — | — | — | — |
| 1988–89 | Buffalo Sabres | NHL | 61 | 7 | 40 | 47 | 52 | 5 | 1 | 1 | 2 | 11 |
| 1989–90 | Buffalo Sabres | NHL | 71 | 12 | 36 | 48 | 64 | 6 | 1 | 5 | 6 | 6 |
| 1990–91 | Buffalo Sabres | NHL | 58 | 5 | 23 | 28 | 54 | 4 | 0 | 1 | 1 | 0 |
| 1991–92 | Buffalo Sabres | NHL | 73 | 11 | 35 | 46 | 108 | 7 | 2 | 1 | 3 | 2 |
| 1992–93 | Buffalo Sabres | NHL | 81 | 9 | 45 | 54 | 87 | 8 | 2 | 3 | 5 | 0 |
| 1993–94 | Buffalo Sabres | NHL | 75 | 7 | 32 | 39 | 76 | 7 | 0 | 3 | 3 | 6 |
| 1994–95 | Buffalo Sabres | NHL | 44 | 3 | 17 | 20 | 47 | 5 | 0 | 4 | 4 | 0 |
| 1995–96 | Buffalo Sabres | NHL | 16 | 0 | 5 | 5 | 18 | — | — | — | — | — |
| 1995–96 | San Jose Sharks | NHL | 57 | 4 | 19 | 23 | 50 | — | — | — | — | — |
| 1996–97 | San Jose Sharks | NHL | 81 | 1 | 15 | 16 | 64 | — | — | — | — | — |
| 1997–98 | San Jose Sharks | NHL | 28 | 4 | 6 | 10 | 32 | — | — | — | — | — |
| 1997–98 | New Jersey Devils | NHL | 49 | 5 | 5 | 10 | 25 | 5 | 0 | 0 | 0 | 0 |
| 1998–99 | Los Angeles Kings | NHL | 65 | 3 | 11 | 14 | 34 | — | — | — | — | — |
| 1999–2000 | Vancouver Canucks | NHL | 13 | 0 | 1 | 1 | 4 | — | — | — | — | — |
| NHL totals | | | 1,071 | 106 | 422 | 528 | 1,007 | 47 | 6 | 18 | 24 | 25 |

=== International ===
| Year | Team | Event | Result | GP | G | A | Pts | PIM |
|---|---|---|---|---|---|---|---|---|
| 1987 | Canada | WC | 4th | 10 | 1 | 1 | 2 | 4 |
| 1996 | Canada | WC | 2nd place, silver medalist(s) | 8 | 0 | 3 | 3 | 0 |
| 1999 | Canada | WC | 4th | 10 | 0 | 2 | 2 | 4 |
| Senior totals | | | | 28 | 1 | 6 | 7 | 8 |

== See also ==
- List of NHL players with 1,000 games played

Awards and achievements
| Preceded by Mario Lemieux | Pittsburgh Penguins first-round draft pick 1984 | Succeeded by Roger Belanger |
