= Jan Vopat =

Czech ice hockey player

- Born: March 22, 1973 (age 53) Most, Czechoslovakia
- Height: 6 ft 0 in (183 cm)
- Weight: 207 lb (94 kg; 14 st 11 lb)
- Position: Defence
- Shot: Left
- Played for: HC Litvínov; Los Angeles Kings; Nashville Predators
- National team: Czech Republic
- NHL draft: 57th overall, 1992; Hartford Whalers
- Playing career: 1990–2000

Jan Vopat (born March 22, 1973) is a Czech former professional ice hockey player who played 126 games in the National Hockey League (NHL) with the Los Angeles Kings and Nashville Predators between 1996 and 1999. He is the older brother of former NHL centre, Roman Vopat. Internationally he played for the Czech national team at several tournaments, including the 1994 Winter Olympics.

== Career statistics ==
=== Regular season and playoffs ===
			Regular season					Playoffs
Season	Team	League	GP	G	A	Pts	PIM	GP	G	A	Pts	PIM
1987–88	TJ CHZ Litvínov	CSSR U16	31	9	7	16	24	—	—	—	—	—
1988–89	TJ CHZ Litvínov	CSSR U16	21	16	15	31	26	—	—	—	—	—
1990–91	HC CHZ Litvínov	CSSR U18
1990–91	HC CHZ Litvínov	CSSR	18	0	3	3	4	7	1	2	2	0
1991–92	HC Chemopetrol Litvínov	CSSR U18	—	—	—	—	—	—	—	—	—	—
1991–92	HC Chemopetrol Litvínov	CSSR	37	1	2	3		9	3	0	3
1992–93	HC Chemopetrol Litvínov	CSSR	45	10	11	21	—	—	—	—	—	—
1993–94	HC Chemopetrol Litvínov	CZE	41	9	18	27	28	4	1	1	2	0
1994–95	HC Litvínov, s.r.o.	CZE	42	7	18	25	29	4	0	2	2	2
1995–96	Los Angeles Kings	NHL	11	1	4	5	4	—	—	—	—	—
1995–96	Phoenix Roadrunners	IHL	47	0	9	9	34	4	0	2	2	4
1996–97	Los Angeles Kings	NHL	33	4	5	9	22	—	—	—	—	—
1996–97	Phoenix Roadrunners	IHL	4	0	6	6	6	—	—	—	—	—
1997–98	Los Angeles Kings	NHL	21	1	5	6	10	2	0	1	1	2
1997–98	Utah Grizzlies	IHL	38	8	13	21	24	—	—	—	—	—
1998–99	Nashville Predators	NHL	55	5	6	11	28	—	—	—	—	—
1999–00	Nashville Predators	NHL	6	0	0	0	6	—	—	—	—	—
1999–00	Milwaukee Admirals	IHL	2	1	0	1	2	—	—	—	—	—
2000–01	EV Landshut	GER-3	32	3	12	15	44	—	—	—	—	—
2001–02	Ilves	FIN	30	4	3	7	92	—	—	—	—	—
2002–03	EHV Schönheide	GER-4	—	—	—	—	—	—	—	—	—	—
CSSR totals			100	11	16	27	—	16	4	2	6	—
NHL totals			126	11	20	31	70	2	0	1	1	2

=== International ===
Year	Team	Event	GP	G	A	Pts	PIM
1990	Czechoslovakia	EJC	6	2	1	3	2
1991	Czechoslovakia	EJC	5	5	0	5	4
1992	Czechoslovakia	WJC	7	0	1	1	2
1993	Czechoslovakia	WJC	7	6	4	10	6
1994	Czech Republic	OLY	8	0	1	1	8
1995	Czech Republic	WC	8	0	1	1	6
Junior totals			25	13	6	19	14
Senior totals			16	0	2	2	14
