= Roman Vopat =

Czech ice hockey player

- Born: April 21, 1976 (age 50) Litvínov, Czechoslovakia
- Height: 6 ft 2 in (188 cm)
- Weight: 220 lb (100 kg; 15 st 10 lb)
- Position: Centre
- Shot: Left
- Played for: HC Litvínov; St. Louis Blues; Los Angeles Kings; Chicago Blackhawks; Philadelphia Flyers; Essen Mosquitoes; Pelicans; Ilves; HIFK; HC Sparta Praha; Jokerit; Leksands IF; Aalborg Pirates
- National team: Czech Republic
- NHL draft: 172nd overall, 1994; St. Louis Blues
- Playing career: 1993–2011

Roman Vopat (born April 21, 1976) is a Czech former professional ice hockey player. He played four seasons in the National Hockey League (NHL) for the St. Louis Blues, Los Angeles Kings, Chicago Blackhawks, and Philadelphia Flyers. He is the younger brother of former NHL defenceman, Jan Vopat.

== Playing career ==
He was drafted by the St. Louis Blues as their seventh-round draft pick, #172 overall, in the 1994 NHL entry draft.

Vopat started his playing career in his native Litvínov, before spending a season in the Western Hockey League with the Moose Jaw Warriors, joining the Blues' IHL affiliate the Peoria Rivermen for their playoff run during the 1994–95 season. He then joined the St. Louis organization the next season but was sent back to Moose Jaw for further development, he later moved to the Prince Albert Raiders.

On February 27, 1996, Vopat, along with Craig Johnson, Patrice Tardif and two draft picks were traded from the St. Louis Blues to the Los Angeles Kings for Wayne Gretzky. After three seasons in LA, he was traded to the Colorado Avalanche for Eric Lacroix, but never played a game for the Avalanche as he was then traded to the Chicago Blackhawks less than a month later. After three games with Chicago he was traded once more to the Philadelphia Flyers for Mike Maneluk.

At the start of the 1999–2000, Vopat was sent to the Flyers' AHL affiliate, the Philadelphia Phantoms, which marked the end of his NHL career. After just 12 games, he spent the rest of the season with the Essen Mosquitoes of the Deutsche Eishockey Liga in Germany. Vopat then played five seasons in Finland's SM-liiga, for Pelicans, Ilves, and HIFK. In 2005, he returned to the Czech Republic with HC Sparta Praha but then returned to Finland, this time signing a contract with Jokerit, HIFK's local archrival. In 2006, he moved to Sweden and signed with Leksands who play in the country second-tier league.

== Career statistics ==
=== Regular season and playoffs ===
			Regular season					Playoffs
Season	Team	League	GP	G	A	Pts	PIM	GP	G	A	Pts	PIM
1991–92	HC Litvínov U16	CSSR U16	31	32	26	58	—	—	—	—	—	—
1992–93	HC Litvínov U18	CSSR U18	—	—	—	—	—	—	—	—	—	—
1993–94	HC Litvínov U18	CZE U18	—	—	—	—	—	—	—	—	—	—
1993–94	Litvínov CPC HC	CZE	7	0	0	0	0	—	—	—	—	—
1994–95	Moose Jaw Warriors	WHL	72	23	20	43	141	10	4	1	5	28
1994–95	Peoria Rivermen	IHL	—	—	—	—	—	6	0	2	2	2
1995–96	Moose Jaw Warriors	WHL	7	0	4	4	34	—	—	—	—	—
1995–96	Prince Albert Raiders	WHL	22	15	5	20	81	18	9	8	17	57
1995–96	Worcester IceCats	AHL	5	2	0	2	4	—	—	—	—	—
1995–96	St. Louis Blues	NHL	25	2	3	5	48	—	—	—	—	—
1996–97	Los Angeles Kings	NHL	29	4	5	9	60	—	—	—	—	—
1996–97	Phoenix Roadrunners	IHL	50	8	8	16	139	—	—	—	—	—
1997–98	Fredericton Canadiens	AHL	29	10	10	20	93	—	—	—	—	—
1997–98	Los Angeles Kings	NHL	25	0	3	3	55	—	—	—	—	—
1998–99	Los Angeles Kings	NHL	3	0	0	0	6	—	—	—	—	—
1998–99	Chicago Blackhawks	NHL	3	0	0	0	4	—	—	—	—	—
1998–99	Philadelphia Flyers	NHL	48	0	3	3	80	—	—	—	—	—
1999–00	Philadelphia Phantoms	AHL	12	1	0	1	12	—	—	—	—	—
1999–00	Essen Mosquitoes	DEL	33	7	9	16	153	—	—	—	—	—
2000–01	Pelicans	SM-l	54	15	13	28	121	3	0	0	0	4
2001–02	Ilves	SM-l	30	4	3	7	92	—	—	—	—	—
2001–02	HIFK	SM-l	21	8	6	14	85	—	—	—	—	—
2002–03	HIFK	SM-l	39	11	12	23	90	4	0	2	2	28
2003–04	HIFK	SM-l	45	10	15	25	118	13	2	0	2	8
2004–05	HIFK	SM-l	39	3	2	5	130	—	—	—	—	—
2005–06	HC Sparta Praha	CZE	27	5	6	11	81	—	—	—	—	—
2005–06	Jokerit	SM-l	23	4	3	7	87	—	—	—	—	—
2006–07	Leksands IF	SWE-2	37	12	11	23	162	7	2	2	4	45
2007–08	Leksands IF	SWE-2	36	6	15	21	171	10	1	2	3	12
2008–09	Aalborg Pirates	DEN	23	8	9	17	89	5	2	0	2	48
2009–10	HC Litvínov	CZE	45	6	9	15	177	5	3	1	4	37
2010–11	HC Litvínov	CZE	43	4	4	8	58	10	2	1	3	46
SM-l totals			253	56	55	111	729	20	2	2	4	40
NHL totals			133	6	14	20	253	—	—	—	—	—

=== International ===
Year	Team	Event	GP	G	A	Pts	PIM
1994	Czech Republic	EJC	5	2	1	3	8
Junior totals			5	2	1	3	8
