= 1991–92 Boston Bruins season =

NHL team season

1991–92 Boston Bruins
- Division: 2nd Adams
- Conference: 6th Wales
- 1991–92 record: 36–32–12
- Home record: 23–11–6
- Road record: 13–21–6
- Goals for: 270
- Goals against: 275

Team information
- General manager: Harry Sinden
- Coach: Rick Bowness
- Captain: Ray Bourque
- Alternate captains: Craig Janney (Oct–Feb); Cam Neely; Dave Poulin (Feb–May); Glen Wesley (Feb–May)
- Arena: Boston Garden

Team leaders
- Goals: Vladimir Ruzicka (39)
- Assists: Ray Bourque (60)
- Points: Ray Bourque (81)
- Penalty minutes: Chris Nilan (186)
- Plus/minus: Ray Bourque (+11)
- Wins: Andy Moog (28)
- Goals against average: Daniel Berthiaume (3.14)

The 1991–92 Boston Bruins season saw the Bruins finish in second place in the Adams Division with a record of 36 wins, 32 losses, and 12 ties for 84 points. They defeated the Buffalo Sabres in seven games in the Division Semi-final and swept the Montreal Canadiens in the Division Finals before being swept themselves in the Wales Conference Finals by the eventual Stanley Cup champion Pittsburgh Penguins. This team holds the current NHL record for most unusual player appearances in a season with 55 total players.

== Regular season ==
=== Final standings ===
Adams Division
	GP	W	L	T	GF	GA	Pts
**Montreal Canadiens**	**80**	**41**	**28**	**11**	**267**	**207**	**93**
**Boston Bruins**	**80**	**36**	**32**	**12**	**270**	**275**	**84**
**Buffalo Sabres**	**80**	**31**	**37**	**12**	**289**	**299**	**74**
**Hartford Whalers**	**80**	**26**	**41**	**13**	**247**	**283**	**65**
Quebec Nordiques	80	20	48	12	255	318	52

Wales Conference
R		Div	GP	W	L	T	GF	GA	Pts
1	**p** – **New York Rangers**	**PAT**	**80**	**50**	**25**	**5**	**321**	**246**	**105**
2	**Washington Capitals**	**PAT**	**80**	**45**	**27**	**8**	**330**	**257**	**98**
3	**Montreal Canadiens**	**ADM**	**80**	**41**	**28**	**11**	**267**	**207**	**93**
4	**Pittsburgh Penguins**	**PAT**	**80**	**39**	**32**	**9**	**343**	**308**	**87**
5	**New Jersey Devils**	**PAT**	**80**	**38**	**31**	**11**	**289**	**259**	**87**
6	**Boston Bruins**	**ADM**	**80**	**36**	**32**	**12**	**270**	**275**	**84**
7	New York Islanders	PAT	80	34	35	11	291	299	79
8	Philadelphia Flyers	PAT	80	32	37	11	252	273	75
9	**Buffalo Sabres**	**ADM**	**80**	**31**	**37**	**12**	**289**	**299**	**74**
10	**Hartford Whalers**	**ADM**	**80**	**26**	**41**	**13**	**247**	**283**	**65**
11	Quebec Nordiques	ADM	80	20	48	12	255	318	52

Divisions: ADM – Adams, PAT – Patrick

p – Clinched Presidents' Trophy
bold – Qualified for playoffs

== Schedule and results ==
1991–92 regular season
October

Game	Result	Date	Score	Opponent	Record
1	W	October 3, 1991	5–3	New York Rangers (1991–92)	1–0–0
2	L	October 5, 1991	3–4	New York Islanders (1991–92)	1–1–0
3	L	October 7, 1991	1–2 OT	@ New York Rangers (1991–92)	1–2–0
4	T	October 9, 1991	4–4 OT	@ Buffalo Sabres (1991–92)	1–2–1
5	L	October 12, 1991	0–6	Montreal Canadiens (1991–92)	1–3–1
6	T	October 17, 1991	3–3 OT	@ Vancouver Canucks (1991–92)	1–3–2
7	W	October 19, 1991	4–1	@ San Jose Sharks (1991–92)	2–3–2
8	L	October 24, 1991	5–6	@ St. Louis Blues (1991–92)	2–4–2
9	L	October 26, 1991	0–4	@ Minnesota North Stars (1991–92)	2–5–2
10	W	October 27, 1991	6–3	@ Chicago Blackhawks (1991–92)	3–5–2
11	L	October 31, 1991	2–4	Los Angeles Kings (1991–92)	3–6–2

November

Game	Result	Date	Score	Opponent	Record
12	W	November 2, 1991	4–1	Detroit Red Wings (1991–92)	4–6–2
13	L	November 4, 1991	4–6	@ New York Islanders (1991–92)	4–7–2
14	T	November 5, 1991	5–5 OT	@ Pittsburgh Penguins (1991–92)	4–7–3
15	T	November 7, 1991	4–4 OT	Calgary Flames (1991–92)	4–7–4
16	W	November 9, 1991	4–0	New Jersey Devils (1991–92)	5–7–4
17	W	November 14, 1991	5–2	Quebec Nordiques (1991–92)	6–7–4
18	W	November 16, 1991	5–4 OT	@ Hartford Whalers (1991–92)	7–7–4
19	L	November 20, 1991	1–3	@ Buffalo Sabres (1991–92)	7–8–4
20	L	November 22, 1991	3–6	@ Washington Capitals (1991–92)	7–9–4
21	W	November 23, 1991	7–4	Buffalo Sabres (1991–92)	8–9–4
22	L	November 25, 1991	3–4	@ Montreal Canadiens (1991–92)	8–10–4
23	W	November 27, 1991	3–2	@ New York Islanders (1991–92)	9–10–4
24	W	November 29, 1991	5–4 OT	Montreal Canadiens (1991–92)	10–10–4

December

Game	Result	Date	Score	Opponent	Record
25	W	December 1, 1991	5–4	Hartford Whalers (1991–92)	11–10–4
26	T	December 5, 1991	2–2 OT	Quebec Nordiques (1991–92)	11–10–5
27	L	December 7, 1991	3–5	Philadelphia Flyers (1991–92)	11–11–5
28	L	December 8, 1991	0–4	@ New York Rangers (1991–92)	11–12–5
29	L	December 10, 1991	2–5	@ Quebec Nordiques (1991–92)	11–13–5
30	W	December 12, 1991	5–2	Montreal Canadiens (1991–92)	12–13–5
31	W	December 14, 1991	4–3	Toronto Maple Leafs (1991–92)	13–13–5
32	L	December 19, 1991	4–6	Pittsburgh Penguins (1991–92)	13–14–5
33	W	December 21, 1991	6–3	Edmonton Oilers (1991–92)	14–14–5
34	L	December 22, 1991	2–3	@ Montreal Canadiens (1991–92)	14–15–5
35	W	December 26, 1991	3–2	Hartford Whalers (1991–92)	15–15–5
36	L	December 27, 1991	1–8	@ Buffalo Sabres (1991–92)	15–16–5
37	W	December 29, 1991	6–3	@ Winnipeg Jets (1991–92)	16–16–5
38	W	December 31, 1991	5–3	@ Detroit Red Wings (1991–92)	17–16–5

January

Game	Result	Date	Score	Opponent	Record
39	L	January 2, 1992	1–3	Winnipeg Jets (1991–92)	17–17–5
40	W	January 4, 1992	4–2	Buffalo Sabres (1991–92)	18–17–5
41	L	January 8, 1992	2–3	@ Montreal Canadiens (1991–92)	18–18–5
42	W	January 9, 1992	5–4	Quebec Nordiques (1991–92)	19–18–5
43	W	January 11, 1992	5–1	Philadelphia Flyers (1991–92)	20–18–5
44	W	January 15, 1992	4–3	@ Hartford Whalers (1991–92)	21–18–5
45	W	January 16, 1992	4–3 OT	Hartford Whalers (1991–92)	22–18–5
46	W	January 22, 1992	5–2	@ Toronto Maple Leafs (1991–92)	23–18–5
47	L	January 23, 1992	1–3	Montreal Canadiens (1991–92)	23–19–5
48	T	January 25, 1992	4–4 OT	@ Hartford Whalers (1991–92)	23–19–6
49	W	January 27, 1992	3–2	Minnesota North Stars (1991–92)	24–19–6
50	W	January 28, 1992	4–2	@ Quebec Nordiques (1991–92)	25–19–6
51	W	January 30, 1992	3–1	Calgary Flames (1991–92)	26–19–6

February

Game	Result	Date	Score	Opponent	Record
52	T	February 1, 1992	2–2 OT	Buffalo Sabres (1991–92)	26–19–7
53	T	February 4, 1992	3–3 OT	@ Winnipeg Jets (1991–92)	26–19–8
54	L	February 6, 1992	1–5	@ Philadelphia Flyers (1991–92)	26–20–8
55	L	February 8, 1992	4–6	New Jersey Devils (1991–92)	26–21–8
56	W	February 9, 1992	6–3	Pittsburgh Penguins (1991–92)	27–21–8
57	L	February 13, 1992	0–4	@ St. Louis Blues (1991–92)	27–22–8
58	L	February 17, 1992	3–6	@ Los Angeles Kings (1991–92)	27–23–8
59	L	February 19, 1992	4–6	@ Calgary Flames (1991–92)	27–24–8
60	W	February 21, 1992	5–3	@ Edmonton Oilers (1991–92)	28–24–8
61	L	February 23, 1992	1–2 OT	@ Vancouver Canucks (1991–92)	28–25–8
62	W	February 27, 1992	4–2	Toronto Maple Leafs (1991–92)	29–25–8
63	T	February 29, 1992	5–5 OT	Washington Capitals (1991–92)	29–25–9

March

Game	Result	Date	Score	Opponent	Record
64	W	March 1, 1992	4–1	@ Washington Capitals (1991–92)	30–25–9
65	L	March 3, 1992	0–4	@ Hartford Whalers (1991–92)	30–26–9
66	T	March 5, 1992	2–2 OT	Vancouver Canucks (1991–92)	30–26–10
67	L	March 7, 1992	1–2	Chicago Blackhawks (1991–92)	30–27–10
68	L	March 8, 1992	0–4	@ Chicago Blackhawks (1991–92)	30–28–10
69	L	March 11, 1992	3–6	@ Buffalo Sabres (1991–92)	30–29–10
70	W	March 14, 1992	5–4 OT	@ Quebec Nordiques (1991–92)	31–29–10
71	W	March 15, 1992	5–1	Los Angeles Kings (1991–92)	32–29–10
72	L	March 19, 1992	1–4	St. Louis Blues (1991–92)	32–30–10
73	L	March 21, 1992	3–4	Edmonton Oilers (1991–92)	32–31–10
74	W	March 23, 1992	7–6	San Jose Sharks (1991–92)	33–31–10
75	L	March 26, 1992	2–4	@ New Jersey Devils (1991–92)	33–32–10
76	W	March 28, 1992	4–3 OT	Buffalo Sabres (1991–92)	34–32–10
77	W	March 31, 1992	5–4 OT	@ Quebec Nordiques (1991–92)	35–32–10

April

Game	Result	Date	Score	Opponent	Record
78	T	April 12, 1992	1–1 OT	Quebec Nordiques (1991–92)	35–32–11
79	W	April 13, 1992	6–3	Hartford Whalers (1991–92)	36–32–11
80	T	April 15, 1992	4–4 OT	@ Montreal Canadiens (1991–92)	36–32–12

Legend: Win (2 points) Loss (0 points) Tie (1 point)

== Playoffs ==
1992 Stanley Cup playoffs
Adams Division Semifinals vs. (A3) Buffalo Sabres – Bruins win 4–3

Game	Date	Visitor	Score	Home	Attendance	Record
1	April 19	Buffalo Sabres	3–2	Boston Bruins	12,681	0–1
2	April 21	Buffalo Sabres	2–3 (OT)	Boston Bruins	12,897	1–1
3	April 23	Boston Bruins	3–2	Buffalo Sabres	14,207	2–1
4	April 25	Boston Bruins	5–4 (OT)	Buffalo Sabres	16,325	3–1
5	April 27	Buffalo Sabres	2–0	Boston Bruins	14,448	3–2
6	April 29	Boston Bruins	3–9	Buffalo Sabres	13,537	3–3
7	May 1	Buffalo Sabres	2–3	Boston Bruins	14,109	4–3

Adams Division Finals vs. (A1) Montreal Canadiens – Bruins win 4–0

Game	Date	Visitor	Score	Home	Attendance	Record
1	May 3	Boston Bruins	6–4	Montreal Canadiens	16,535	1–0
2	May 5	Boston Bruins	3–2 (OT)	Montreal Canadiens	17,033	2–0
3	May 7	Montreal Canadiens	2–3	Boston Bruins	14,448	3–0
4	May 9	Montreal Canadiens	0–2	Boston Bruins	14,448	4–0

Wales Conference Finals vs. (P3) Pittsburgh Penguins – Penguins win 4–0

Game	Date	Visitor	Score	Home	Attendance	Record
1	May 17	Boston Bruins	3–4 (OT)	Pittsburgh Penguins	16,164	0–1
2	May 19	Boston Bruins	2–5	Pittsburgh Penguins	16,164	0–2
3	May 21	Pittsburgh Penguins	5–1	Boston Bruins	14,448	0–3
4	May 23	Pittsburgh Penguins	5–1	Boston Bruins	14,448	0–4

Legend: Win Loss

== Player statistics ==
=== Regular season ===
Scoring

Player	Pos	GP	G	A	Pts	PIM	+/-	PPG	SHG	GWG
Ray Bourque	D	80	21	60	81	56	11	7	1	2
Vladimir Ruzicka	C	77	39	36	75	48	-10	18	0	6
Stephen Leach	RW	78	31	29	60	147	-8	12	0	4
Craig Janney	C	53	12	39	51	20	1	3	0	1
Bobby Carpenter	C	60	25	23	48	46	-3	6	1	6
Glen Wesley	D	78	9	37	46	54	-9	4	0	1
Brent Ashton	LW	61	17	22	39	47	-4	6	1	1
Adam Oates	C	26	10	20	30	10	-5	3	0	1
Andy Brickley	LW/C	23	10	17	27	2	6	5	0	1
Peter Douris	RW	54	10	13	23	10	9	0	0	1
Bob Sweeney	C/RW	63	6	14	20	103	-9	0	1	1
Joe Juneau	C	14	5	14	19	4	6	2	0	0
Ken Hodge Jr.	C/RW	42	6	11	17	10	-8	3	1	3
Dave Reid	LW	43	7	7	14	27	5	2	1	0
Stephane Quintal	D	49	4	10	14	77	-8	0	0	0
Don Sweeney	D	75	3	11	14	74	-9	0	0	1
Garry Galley	D	38	2	12	14	83	-3	1	0	0
Cam Neely	RW	9	9	3	12	16	9	1	0	2
Chris Nilan	RW	39	5	5	10	186	-5	0	0	0
Jeff Lazaro	LW	27	3	6	9	31	4	0	0	0
Nevin Markwart	LW	18	3	6	9	44	2	0	0	0
Gord Murphy	D	42	3	6	9	51	2	0	0	0
Barry Pederson	C	32	3	6	9	8	-5	1	0	0
Jim Wiemer	D	47	1	8	9	84	10	0	0	0
Scott Arniel	LW	29	5	3	8	20	5	0	0	1
Dave Poulin	C	18	4	4	8	18	-2	0	1	1
Steve Heinze	RW	14	3	4	7	6	-1	0	0	2
Bob Beers	D	31	0	5	5	29	-13	0	0	0
Gord Hynes	D	15	0	5	5	6	8	0	0	0
Glen Murray	RW	5	3	1	4	0	2	1	0	0
Chris Winnes	RW	24	1	3	4	6	-6	0	0	0
Lou Crawford	LW	19	2	1	3	9	-6	0	0	0
Ted Donato	LW	10	1	2	3	8	-1	0	0	0
Andy Moog	G	62	0	3	3	52	0	0	0	0
Wes Walz	C	15	0	3	3	12	-3	0	0	0
Lyndon Byers	RW	31	1	1	2	129	-5	0	0	0
Brent Hughes	LW	8	1	1	2	38	1	0	0	1
John Byce	C	3	1	0	1	0	-1	1	0	0
Brian Dobbin	RW	7	1	0	1	22	0	0	0	0
Glen Featherstone	D	7	1	0	1	20	-2	0	0	0
Petri Skriko	RW	9	1	0	1	6	-3	1	0	0
Jozef Stümpel	C	4	1	0	1	0	1	0	0	0
Ralph Barahona	C	3	0	1	1	0	1	0	0	0
Clark Donatelli	LW	10	0	1	1	22	-8	0	0	0
Matt Hervey	D	16	0	1	1	55	-5	0	0	0
Rejean Lemelin	G	8	0	1	1	2	0	0	0	0
Shayne Stevenson	RW	5	0	1	1	2	1	0	0	0
Dave Thomlinson	LW	12	0	1	1	17	-2	0	0	0
Daniel Berthiaume	G	8	0	0	0	0	0	0	0	0
Jack Capuano	D	2	0	0	0	0	-1	0	0	0
Matt DelGuidice	G	10	0	0	0	2	0	0	0	0
Matt Glennon	LW	3	0	0	0	2	0	0	0	0
Petr Prajsler	D	3	0	0	0	2	-1	0	0	0
Alan Stewart	LW	4	0	0	0	17	-1	0	0	0
Jim Vesey	C/RW	4	0	0	0	0	0	0	0	0

Goaltending

Player	MIN	GP	W	L	T	GA	GAA	SO	SA	SV	SV%
Andy Moog	3640	62	28	22	9	196	3.23	1	1727	1531	.887
Rejean Lemelin	407	8	5	1	0	23	3.39	0	210	187	.890
Matt DelGuidice	424	10	2	5	1	28	3.96	0	239	211	.883
Daniel Berthiaume	399	8	1	4	2	21	3.16	0	156	135	.865
Team:	4870	80	36	32	12	268	3.30	1	2332	2064	.885

=== Playoffs ===
Scoring

Player	Pos	GP	G	A	Pts	PIM	+/-	PPG	SHG	GWG
Adam Oates	C	15	5	14	19	4	-6	3	0	2
Joe Juneau	C	15	4	8	12	21	-3	2	0	0
Ray Bourque	D	12	3	6	9	12	-10	2	0	0
Ted Donato	LW	15	3	4	7	4	0	0	0	1
Dave Reid	LW	15	2	5	7	4	2	0	0	1
Glen Murray	RW	15	4	2	6	10	-1	1	0	0
Dave Poulin	C	15	3	3	6	22	2	1	0	1
Glen Wesley	D	15	2	4	6	16	3	0	0	0
Peter Douris	RW	7	2	3	5	0	2	0	0	1
Vladimir Ruzicka	C	13	2	3	5	2	-7	2	0	0
Stephen Leach	RW	15	4	0	4	10	-2	0	0	1
Jim Wiemer	D	15	1	3	4	14	3	0	0	1
Gord Hynes	D	12	1	2	3	6	-3	0	0	0
Steve Heinze	RW	7	0	3	3	17	3	0	0	0
Brent Hughes	LW	10	2	0	2	20	-3	0	0	0
Gord Murphy	D	15	1	0	1	12	-1	0	0	0
Bob Sweeney	C/RW	14	1	0	1	25	-7	0	1	0
Bobby Carpenter	C	8	0	1	1	6	-1	0	0	0
Jeff Lazaro	LW	9	0	1	1	2	0	0	0	0
Andy Moog	G	15	0	1	1	17	0	0	0	0
Bob Beers	D	1	0	0	0	0	0	0	0	0
Lyndon Byers	RW	5	0	0	0	12	-3	0	0	0
Clark Donatelli	LW	2	0	0	0	0	0	0	0	0
Matt Hervey	D	5	0	0	0	6	-1	0	0	0
Rejean Lemelin	G	2	0	0	0	0	0	0	0	0
Don Sweeney	D	15	0	0	0	10	-3	0	0	0

Goaltending

Player	MIN	GP	W	L	GA	GAA	SO	SA	SV	SV%
Andy Moog	866	15	8	7	46	3.19	1	385	339	.881
Rejean Lemelin	54	2	0	0	3	3.33	0	23	20	.870
Team:	920	15	8	7	49	3.20	1	408	359	.880

Note:

Pos = Position;GP = Games played; G = Goals; A = Assists; Pts = Points; PIM = Penalty minutes; +/- = Plus/minus; PPG = Power-play goals; SHG = Short-handed goals; GWG = Game-winning goals
Pos = Position;GP = Games played; Min, TOI = Minutes played; W = Wins; L = Losses; T,T/OT = Ties; OTL = Overtime losses; GA = Goals-against; GAA = Goals-against average; SO = Shutouts; SA = Shots against; SV = Shots saved;SV% = Save percentage;

== Draft picks ==
Boston's draft picks at the 1991 NHL entry draft held at the Buffalo Memorial Auditorium in Buffalo, New York.

Round	#	Player	Nationality	College/Junior/Club team (League)
1	18	Glen Murray	Canada	Sudbury Wolves (OHL)
2	40	Jozef Stumpel	Czechoslovakia	HK Nitra (Czechoslovakia)
3	62	Marcel Cousineau	Canada	Beauport Harfangs (QMJHL)
4	84	Brad Tiley	Canada	Sault Ste. Marie Greyhounds (OHL)
5	106	Mariusz Czerkawski	Poland	GKS Tychy (Poland)
7	150	Gary Golczewski	United States	Trinity-Pawling School (USHS–NY)
8	172	Jay Moser	United States	Park High School (USHS–MN)
9	194	Dan Hodge	United States	Merrimack College (Hockey East)
10	216	Steve Norton	Canada	Michigan State University (CCHA)
11	238	Steve Lombardi	United States	Deerfield Academy (USHS–MA)
12	260	Torsten Kienass	Germany	Dynamo Berlin (East Germany)
S	24	Peter Allen	Canada	Yale University (ECAC)
