= 1991–92 New York Islanders season =

NHL hockey team season

1991–92 New York Islanders
- Division: 5th Patrick
- Conference: 7th Wales
- 1991–92 record: 34–35–11
- Home record: 20–15–5
- Road record: 14–20–6
- Goals for: 291
- Goals against: 299

Team information
- General manager: Bill Torrey
- Coach: Al Arbour
- Captain: Brent Sutter (Oct.); Patrick Flatley (Oct.–Apr.)
- Arena: Nassau Coliseum

Team leaders
- Goals: Ray Ferraro, Derek King (40)
- Assists: Pierre Turgeon (49)
- Points: Pierre Turgeon (87)
- Penalty minutes: Mick Vukota (293)
- Plus/minus: Benoit Hogue (+30)
- Wins: Glenn Healy (14)
- Goals against average: Mark Fitzpatrick (3.20)

The 1991–92 New York Islanders season was the 20th season in the franchise's history. Denis Potvin's number 5 and Mike Bossy's number 22 were retired by the franchise. For the second straight year, the Islanders failed to qualify for the playoffs.

== Regular season ==
Pat LaFontaine, frustrated with his situation on Long Island, turned down a four year, $6 million contract offer and refused to report to the Islanders for the start of the 1991–92 NHL season. Three weeks into the season, on 25 October 1991, LaFontaine was traded, along with teammate Randy Wood, to the Buffalo Sabres for four players, including former first overall pick Pierre Turgeon.

Also in October, Captain Brent Sutter is traded to the Chicago Blackhawks. Forward Patrick Flatley is named team captain.

Although they finished last in the NHL in penalty-killing percentage (76.50%), the Islanders had a good power-play unit, finishing third in the NHL with 22.12% (75 for 339).

=== Season standings ===
Patrick Division
	GP	W	L	T	GF	GA	Pts
**New York Rangers**	**80**	**50**	**25**	**5**	**321**	**246**	**105**
**Washington Capitals**	**80**	**45**	**27**	**8**	**330**	**257**	**98**
**Pittsburgh Penguins**	**80**	**39**	**32**	**9**	**343**	**308**	**87**
**New Jersey Devils**	**80**	**38**	**31**	**11**	**289**	**259**	**87**
New York Islanders	80	34	35	11	291	299	79
Philadelphia Flyers	80	32	37	11	252	273	75

Wales Conference
R		Div	GP	W	L	T	GF	GA	Pts
1	**p** – **New York Rangers**	**PAT**	**80**	**50**	**25**	**5**	**321**	**246**	**105**
2	**Washington Capitals**	**PAT**	**80**	**45**	**27**	**8**	**330**	**257**	**98**
3	**Montreal Canadiens**	**ADM**	**80**	**41**	**28**	**11**	**267**	**207**	**93**
4	**Pittsburgh Penguins**	**PAT**	**80**	**39**	**32**	**9**	**343**	**308**	**87**
5	**New Jersey Devils**	**PAT**	**80**	**38**	**31**	**11**	**289**	**259**	**87**
6	**Boston Bruins**	**ADM**	**80**	**36**	**32**	**12**	**270**	**275**	**84**
7	New York Islanders	PAT	80	34	35	11	291	299	79
8	Philadelphia Flyers	PAT	80	32	37	11	252	273	75
9	**Buffalo Sabres**	**ADM**	**80**	**31**	**37**	**12**	**289**	**299**	**74**
10	**Hartford Whalers**	**ADM**	**80**	**26**	**41**	**13**	**247**	**283**	**65**
11	Quebec Nordiques	ADM	80	20	48	12	255	318	52

Divisions: ADM – Adams, PAT – Patrick

p – Clinched Presidents' Trophy
bold – Qualified for playoffs

== Schedule and results ==
1991–92 regular season
October

Game	Result	Date	Score	Opponent	Record
1	W	October 5, 1991	4–3	@ Boston Bruins (1991–92)	1–0–0
2	L	October 9, 1991	3–5	@ New York Rangers (1991–92)	1–1–0
3	W	October 12, 1991	5–4	Philadelphia Flyers (1991–92)	2–1–0
4	T	October 13, 1991	1–1 OT	@ Quebec Nordiques (1991–92)	2–1–1
5	L	October 15, 1991	6–7 OT	Pittsburgh Penguins (1991–92)	2–2–1
6	L	October 17, 1991	5–8	@ Pittsburgh Penguins (1991–92)	2–3–1
7	L	October 19, 1991	2–4	Edmonton Oilers (1991–92)	2–4–1
8	T	October 22, 1991	1–1 OT	Winnipeg Jets (1991–92)	2–4–2
9	L	October 26, 1991	2–4	Los Angeles Kings (1991–92)	2–5–2
10	W	October 29, 1991	8–4	San Jose Sharks (1991–92)	3–5–2
11	L	October 31, 1991	3–4	@ Chicago Blackhawks (1991–92)	3–6–2

November

Game	Result	Date	Score	Opponent	Record
12	L	November 2, 1991	4–7	Washington Capitals (1991–92)	3–7–2
13	W	November 4, 1991	6–4	Boston Bruins (1991–92)	4–7–2
14	L	November 6, 1991	3–5	@ Edmonton Oilers (1991–92)	4–8–2
15	L	November 9, 1991	3–4	@ San Jose Sharks (1991–92)	4–9–2
16	L	November 10, 1991	0–6	@ Vancouver Canucks (1991–92)	4–10–2
17	W	November 14, 1991	4–3	@ New Jersey Devils (1991–92)	5–10–2
18	W	November 16, 1991	4–2	New York Rangers (1991–92)	6–10–2
19	W	November 19, 1991	7–4	@ Minnesota North Stars (1991–92)	7–10–2
20	L	November 20, 1991	1–3	@ Winnipeg Jets (1991–92)	7–11–2
21	T	November 23, 1991	2–2 OT	@ Pittsburgh Penguins (1991–92)	7–11–3
22	L	November 27, 1991	2–3	Boston Bruins (1991–92)	7–12–3
23	W	November 29, 1991	3–2	@ Washington Capitals (1991–92)	8–12–3
24	W	November 30, 1991	8–1	Washington Capitals (1991–92)	9–12–3

December

Game	Result	Date	Score	Opponent	Record
25	L	December 5, 1991	4–5 OT	Montreal Canadiens (1991–92)	9–13–3
26	L	December 7, 1991	2–5	Chicago Blackhawks (1991–92)	9–14–3
27	T	December 10, 1991	7–7 OT	St. Louis Blues (1991–92)	9–14–4
28	W	December 11, 1991	5–4	@ Toronto Maple Leafs (1991–92)	10–14–4
29	T	December 14, 1991	3–3 OT	New Jersey Devils (1991–92)	10–14–5
30	W	December 17, 1991	4–2	@ Hartford Whalers (1991–92)	11–14–5
31	L	December 19, 1991	2–6	@ Philadelphia Flyers (1991–92)	11–15–5
32	L	December 21, 1991	2–6	@ St. Louis Blues (1991–92)	11–16–5
33	L	December 23, 1991	3–6	Pittsburgh Penguins (1991–92)	11–17–5
34	T	December 26, 1991	5–5 OT	New Jersey Devils (1991–92)	11–17–6
35	W	December 28, 1991	5–4	New York Rangers (1991–92)	12–17–6
36	L	December 29, 1991	4–6	@ Hartford Whalers (1991–92)	12–18–6

January

Game	Result	Date	Score	Opponent	Record
37	L	January 1, 1992	5–8	@ Washington Capitals (1991–92)	12–19–6
38	L	January 3, 1992	2–5	@ Buffalo Sabres (1991–92)	12–20–6
39	W	January 4, 1992	5–2	Quebec Nordiques (1991–92)	13–20–6
40	W	January 7, 1992	5–2	@ Detroit Red Wings (1991–92)	14–20–6
41	W	January 9, 1992	2–1	Hartford Whalers (1991–92)	15–20–6
42	L	January 11, 1992	3–6	St. Louis Blues (1991–92)	15–21–6
43	L	January 12, 1992	3–4	@ Philadelphia Flyers (1991–92)	15–22–6
44	W	January 14, 1992	6–2	Detroit Red Wings (1991–92)	16–22–6
45	W	January 16, 1992	4–3	Philadelphia Flyers (1991–92)	17–22–6
46	L	January 23, 1992	3–4	Toronto Maple Leafs (1991–92)	17–23–6
47	L	January 25, 1992	3–5	Pittsburgh Penguins (1991–92)	17–24–6
48	W	January 30, 1992	8–5	@ Pittsburgh Penguins (1991–92)	18–24–6

February

Game	Result	Date	Score	Opponent	Record
49	T	February 1, 1992	5–5 OT	Philadelphia Flyers (1991–92)	18–24–7
50	W	February 2, 1992	6–3	Calgary Flames (1991–92)	19–24–7
51	W	February 4, 1992	2–1	@ Los Angeles Kings (1991–92)	20–24–7
52	W	February 6, 1992	5–4 OT	@ Vancouver Canucks (1991–92)	21–24–7
53	L	February 7, 1992	2–4	@ Edmonton Oilers (1991–92)	21–25–7
54	W	February 11, 1992	3–1	@ Calgary Flames (1991–92)	22–25–7
55	L	February 14, 1992	2–9	@ New York Rangers (1991–92)	22–26–7
56	W	February 15, 1992	3–1	Vancouver Canucks (1991–92)	23–26–7
57	W	February 17, 1992	5–4 OT	Winnipeg Jets (1991–92)	24–26–7
58	W	February 20, 1992	6–2	New York Rangers (1991–92)	25–26–7
59	W	February 22, 1992	2–1	Minnesota North Stars (1991–92)	26–26–7
60	L	February 23, 1992	1–4	Washington Capitals (1991–92)	26–27–7
61	L	February 25, 1992	1–4	@ Philadelphia Flyers (1991–92)	26–28–7
62	W	February 28, 1992	3–2 OT	@ New Jersey Devils (1991–92)	27–28–7
63	L	February 29, 1992	1–3	New Jersey Devils (1991–92)	27–29–7

March

Game	Result	Date	Score	Opponent	Record
64	L	March 3, 1992	3–4	Montreal Canadiens (1991–92)	27–30–7
65	T	March 5, 1992	4–4 OT	@ Chicago Blackhawks (1991–92)	27–30–8
66	L	March 7, 1992	2–8	@ Montreal Canadiens (1991–92)	27–31–8
67	W	March 8, 1992	6–2	@ Buffalo Sabres (1991–92)	28–31–8
68	W	March 10, 1992	5–2	Philadelphia Flyers (1991–92)	29–31–8
69	L	March 12, 1992	4–6	@ Pittsburgh Penguins (1991–92)	29–32–8
70	W	March 14, 1992	4–1	Buffalo Sabres (1991–92)	30–32–8
71	L	March 15, 1992	2–5	@ Washington Capitals (1991–92)	30–33–8
72	T	March 18, 1992	1–1 OT	@ New York Rangers (1991–92)	30–33–9
73	T	March 21, 1992	2–2 OT	@ New Jersey Devils (1991–92)	30–33–10
74	L	March 24, 1992	2–5	@ Quebec Nordiques (1991–92)	30–34–10
75	W	March 26, 1992	7–4	San Jose Sharks (1991–92)	31–34–10
76	W	March 28, 1992	4–1	New York Rangers (1991–92)	32–34–10
77	L	March 29, 1992	2–6	Detroit Red Wings (1991–92)	32–35–10

April

Game	Result	Date	Score	Opponent	Record
78	W	April 12, 1992	6–2	@ Toronto Maple Leafs (1991–92)	33–35–10
79	T	April 13, 1992	1–1 OT	@ Washington Capitals (1991–92)	33–35–11
80	W	April 15, 1992	7–0	New Jersey Devils (1991–92)	34–35–11

Legend: Win (2 points) Loss (0 points) Tie (1 point)

== Player statistics ==
Regular season
Scoring

Player	Pos	GP	G	A	Pts	PIM	+/-	PPG	SHG	GWG
Pierre Turgeon	C	69	38	49	87	16	8	13	0	6
Ray Ferraro	C	80	40	40	80	92	25	7	0	4
Derek King	LW	80	40	38	78	46	-10	21	0	6
Benoit Hogue	C	72	30	45	75	67	30	8	0	5
Steve Thomas	LW	71	28	42	70	71	11	3	0	2
David Volek	W	74	18	42	60	35	0	4	1	2
Tom Kurvers	D	74	9	47	56	30	-18	6	0	1
Pat Flatley	RW	38	8	28	36	31	14	4	1	0
Uwe Krupp	D	59	6	29	35	43	13	2	0	0
Adam Creighton	C	66	15	9	24	102	-4	2	0	2
Dave McLlwain	C/RW	54	8	15	23	28	-8	1	1	1
Jeff Norton	D	28	1	18	19	18	2	0	1	0
Tom Fitzgerald	RW	45	6	11	17	28	-3	0	2	2
Joe Reekie	D	54	4	12	16	85	15	0	0	0
Bill Berg	LW	47	5	9	14	28	-18	1	0	1
Jeff Finley	D	51	1	10	11	26	-6	0	0	0
Brent Sutter	C	8	4	6	10	6	-5	1	0	1
Hubie McDonough	C	33	7	2	9	15	-4	1	1	0
Marty McInnis	RW	15	3	5	8	0	6	0	0	0
Rob DiMaio	RW	50	5	2	7	43	-23	0	2	0
Daniel Marois	RW	12	2	5	7	18	2	0	0	0
Rich Pilon	D	65	1	6	7	183	-1	0	0	0
Wayne McBean	D	25	2	4	6	18	11	0	1	1
Mick Vukota	RW	74	0	6	6	293	-6	0	0	0
Scott Lachance	D	17	1	4	5	9	13	0	0	0
Randy Wood	LW/C	8	2	2	4	21	-3	0	0	0
Brad Dalgarno	RW	15	2	1	3	12	-8	1	0	0
Graeme Townshend	RW	7	1	2	3	0	6	0	0	0
Dave Chyzowski	LW	12	1	1	2	17	-4	0	0	0
Claude Loiselle	C	11	1	1	2	13	-3	0	0	0
Mark Fitzpatrick	G	30	0	2	2	8	0	0	0	0
Dean Chynoweth	D	11	1	0	1	23	-3	0	0	0
Brad Lauer	LW	8	1	0	1	2	-2	0	1	0
Ken Baumgartner	LW	44	0	1	1	202	-10	0	0	0
Glenn Healy	G	37	0	1	1	18	0	0	0	0
Gary Nylund	D	7	0	1	1	10	-3	0	0	0
Dennis Vaske	D	39	0	1	1	39	5	0	0	0
Rick Green	D	4	0	0	0	0	-1	0	0	0
Randy Hillier	D	8	0	0	0	11	-3	0	0	0
Richard Kromm	LW	1	0	0	0	0	0	0	0	0
Danny Lorenz	G	2	0	0	0	0	0	0	0	0
Greg Parks	C	1	0	0	0	2	0	0	0	0
Brad Turner	D	3	0	0	0	0	1	0	0	0
Steve Weeks	G	23	0	0	0	2	0	0	0	0

Goaltending

Player	MIN	GP	W	L	T	GA	GAA	SO	SA	SV	SV%
Glenn Healy	1960	37	14	16	4	124	3.80	1	1045	921	.881
Mark Fitzpatrick	1743	30	11	13	5	93	3.20	0	949	856	.902
Steve Weeks	1032	23	9	4	2	62	3.60	0	566	504	.890
Danny Lorenz	120	2	0	2	0	10	5.00	0	60	50	.833
Team:	4855	80	34	35	11	289	3.57	1	2620	2331	.890

Note: Pos = Position; GP = Games played; G = Goals; A = Assists; Pts = Points; +/- = plus/minus; PIM = Penalty minutes; PPG = Power-play goals; SHG = Short-handed goals; GWG = Game-winning goals
MIN = Minutes played; W = Wins; L = Losses; T = Ties; GA = Goals-against; GAA = Goals-against average; SO = Shutouts; SA = Shots against; SV = Shots saved; SV% = Save percentage;

== Draft picks ==
New York's draft picks at the 1991 NHL entry draft held at the Buffalo Memorial Auditorium in Buffalo, New York.

Round	#	Player	Nationality	College/Junior/Club team (League)
1	4	Scott Lachance	United States	Boston University (Hockey East)
2	26	Zigmund Palffy	Czechoslovakia	HK Nitra (Czechoslovakia)
3	48	Jamie McLennan	Canada	Lethbridge Hurricanes (WHL)
4	70	Milan Hnilicka	Czechoslovakia	Poldi SONP Kladno (Czechoslovakia)
5	92	Steve Junker	Canada	Spokane Chiefs (WHL)
6	114	Rob Valicevic	United States	Detroit Compuware Ambassadors (SOJHL)
7	136	Andreas Johansson	Sweden	Falu IF (Sweden)
8	158	Todd Sparks	Canada	Hull Olympiques (QMJHL)
9	180	John Johnson	Canada	Niagara Falls Thunder (OHL)
10	202	Rob Canavan	United States	Hingham High School (USHS-MA)
11	224	Marcus Thuresson	Sweden	Leksands IF (Sweden)
12	246	Marty Schriner	United States	University of North Dakota (WCHA)
S	4	Jim Bonner	United States	Michigan Technological University (WCHA)
S	10	Jack Duffy	United States	Yale University (ECAC)

== See also ==
- 1991–92 NHL season
