= 1991–92 Chicago Blackhawks season =

National Hockey League team season

1991–92 Chicago Blackhawks
- Campbell Conference champions
- Division: 2nd Norris
- Conference: 3rd Campbell
- 1991–92 record: 36–29–15
- Home record: 23–9–8
- Road record: 13–20–7
- Goals for: 257
- Goals against: 236

Team information
- General manager: Mike Keenan
- Coach: Mike Keenan
- Captain: Dirk Graham
- Alternate captains: Chris Chelios; Steve Larmer
- Arena: Chicago Stadium

Team leaders
- Goals: Jeremy Roenick (53)
- Assists: Jeremy Roenick (50)
- Points: Jeremy Roenick (103)
- Penalty minutes: Mike Peluso (408)
- Plus/minus: Chris Chelios (+24)
- Wins: Ed Belfour (21)
- Goals against average: Dominik Hasek (2.60)

The 1991–92 Chicago Blackhawks season saw the Blackhawks finish second in the Norris Division with a record of 36 wins, 29 losses, and 15 ties for 87 points. They defeated the St. Louis Blues in six games in the Division Semi-finals and swept the first-place Detroit Red Wings in the Division Finals. After sweeping the Edmonton Oilers in the Campbell Conference Finals, the Blackhawks met the defending Stanley Cup champion Pittsburgh Penguins in the Stanley Cup Finals. However, Chicago's luck ran out against Pittsburgh, as the Penguins swept them in four straight games to capture their second straight Stanley Cup championship.

== Off-season ==
Following the Blackhawks implosion in the first round of the 1991 playoffs, it was no surprise Mike Keenan made some major changes. The off-season saw the Blackhawks make a series of trades that parted ways with Doug Wilson, Troy Murray, Dave Manson, Wayne Presley, Adam Creighton, Steve Thomas and Greg Millen. In return the Hawks added Brent Sutter, Steve Smith, Bryan Marchment and Brad Lauer.

=== NHL draft ===
| Round | # | Player | Position | Nationality | College/Junior/Club team (League) |
|---|---|---|---|---|---|
| 1 | 22 | Dean McAmmond | Center | Canada | Prince Albert Raiders (WHL) |
| 2 | 39 | Mike Pomichter | Center | United States | Springfield Olympics (NEJHL) |
| 2 | 44 | Jamie Matthews | Center | Canada | Sudbury Wolves (OHL) |
| 3 | 66 | Bobby House | Right wing | Canada | Brandon Wheat Kings (WHL) |
| 4 | 71 | Igor Kravchuk | Defense | Soviet Union | CSKA Moscow (USSR) |
| 4 | 88 | Zac Boyer | Right wing | Canada | Kamloops Blazers (WHL) |
| 5 | 110 | Maco Balkovec | Defense | Canada | Merritt Centennials (BCHL) |
| 6 | 112 | Kevin St. Jacques | Left wing | Canada | Lethbridge Hurricanes (WHL) |
| 6 | 132 | Jacques Auger | Defense | Canada | University of Wisconsin (WCHA) |
| 7 | 154 | Scott Kirton | Right wing | Canada | Powell River Paper Kings (BCHL) |
| 8 | 176 | Roch Belley | Goaltender | Canada | Niagara Falls Thunder (OHL) |
| 9 | 198 | Scott MacDonald | Defense | United States | Choate Rosemary Hall (USHS-CT) |
| 10 | 220 | Alexander Andrievsky | Right wing | Soviet Union | Dynamo Moscow (USSR) |
| 11 | 242 | Mike Larkin | Defense | United States | Rice Memorial High School (USHS-MA) |
| 12 | 264 | Scott Dean | Defense | United States | Lake Forest High School (USHS-IL) |
| S | 28 | Dan Gravelle | Left wing | Canada | Merrimack College (Hockey East) |

== Regular season ==
Following their Presidents' Cup level play the prior year, the 1991–92 regular season was disappointing second-place finish with only 87 points (19 less than the prior year). The Blackhawks did, however, make the playoffs for their 23 consecutive season. The Blackhawks had the most power-play opportunities in the NHL, with 467.

Offensively, the Hawks were led by center Jeremy Roenick in goals (53), assists (50) and scoring (103). This was Roenick's first of three straight 100 point seasons. Steve Larmer was second on the team in goals (29) and points (74). Chris Chelios was second on the team in assists (47) and tied with Steve Smith for the lead in goals (9) by a defenseman. Mike Peluso only played in 63 games, but was able to accumulate 408 minutes in the penalty box breaking Dave Manson's record.

Ed Belfour's multiple trophy season the year before virtually continued into the 1991–92 season despite being a contract holdout to begin the season. He also missed a brief spell in the second half of the season for personal reasons. This enabled Dominik Hasek to show flashes of the brilliance that would later define his Hall of Fame career. Hasek earned All-Rookie honors with a 10–4–1 record and a 2.60 GGA, while Belfour was 21–18–10 with a 2.70 GGA. The Hawks tried to get former first-rounder Jimmy Waite going during Belfour's holdout absence, however he could only produce a 4–7–4 record and a 3.69 GGA. Raymond LeBlanc, the ex-Team USA goalie, played one game in net, allowing only one goal in a win versus the San Jose Sharks.

=== Final standings ===
Norris Division
| | GP | W | L | T | GF | GA | Pts |
|---|---|---|---|---|---|---|---|
| **Detroit Red Wings** | **80** | **43** | **25** | **12** | **320** | **256** | **98** |
| **Chicago Blackhawks** | **80** | **36** | **29** | **15** | **257** | **236** | **87** |
| **St. Louis Blues** | **80** | **36** | **33** | **11** | **279** | **266** | **83** |
| **Minnesota North Stars** | **80** | **32** | **42** | **6** | **246** | **278** | **70** |
| Toronto Maple Leafs | 80 | 30 | 43 | 7 | 234 | 294 | 67 |

Campbell Conference
| R | | Div | GP | W | L | T | GF | GA | Pts |
|---|---|---|---|---|---|---|---|---|---|
| 1 | **Detroit Red Wings** | **NRS** | **80** | **43** | **25** | **12** | **320** | **256** | **98** |
| 2 | **Vancouver Canucks** | **SMY** | **80** | **42** | **26** | **12** | **285** | **250** | **96** |
| 3 | **Chicago Blackhawks** | **NRS** | **80** | **36** | **29** | **15** | **257** | **236** | **87** |
| 4 | **Los Angeles Kings** | **SMY** | **80** | **35** | **31** | **14** | **287** | **296** | **84** |
| 5 | **St. Louis Blues** | **NRS** | **80** | **36** | **33** | **11** | **279** | **266** | **83** |
| 6 | **Edmonton Oilers** | **SMY** | **80** | **36** | **34** | **10** | **295** | **297** | **82** |
| 7 | **Winnipeg Jets** | **SMY** | **80** | **33** | **32** | **15** | **251** | **244** | **81** |
| 8 | Calgary Flames | SMY | 80 | 31 | 37 | 12 | 296 | 305 | 74 |
| 9 | **Minnesota North Stars** | **NRS** | **80** | **32** | **42** | **6** | **246** | **278** | **70** |
| 10 | Toronto Maple Leafs | NRS | 80 | 30 | 43 | 7 | 234 | 294 | 67 |
| 11 | San Jose Sharks | SMY | 80 | 17 | 58 | 5 | 219 | 359 | 39 |

Divisions: NRS – Norris, SMY – Smythe
bold – Qualified for playoffs

== Schedule and results ==
1991–92 regular season
October

| Game | Result | Date | Score | Opponent | Record |
|---|---|---|---|---|---|
| 1 | T | October 3, 1991 | 3–3 OT | Detroit Red Wings (1991–92) | 0–0–1 |
| 2 | L | October 5, 1991 | 2–4 | @ Minnesota North Stars (1991–92) | 0–1–1 |
| 3 | L | October 6, 1991 | 2–4 | New Jersey Devils (1991–92) | 0–2–1 |
| 4 | W | October 10, 1991 | 7–6 | Vancouver Canucks (1991–92) | 1–2–1 |
| 5 | W | October 12, 1991 | 7–2 | @ Washington Capitals (1991–92) | 2–2–1 |
| 6 | W | October 13, 1991 | 7–3 | San Jose Sharks (1991–92) | 3–2–1 |
| 7 | W | October 17, 1991 | 4–2 | Edmonton Oilers (1991–92) | 4–2–1 |
| 8 | T | October 19, 1991 | 4–4 OT | @ St. Louis Blues (1991–92) | 4–2–2 |
| 9 | L | October 20, 1991 | 1–4 | St. Louis Blues (1991–92) | 4–3–2 |
| 10 | T | October 22, 1991 | 4–4 OT | @ Pittsburgh Penguins (1991–92) | 4–3–3 |
| 11 | L | October 24, 1991 | 2–5 | Calgary Flames (1991–92) | 4–4–3 |
| 12 | W | October 26, 1991 | 4–2 | @ Hartford Whalers (1991–92) | 5–4–3 |
| 13 | L | October 27, 1991 | 3–6 | Boston Bruins (1991–92) | 5–5–3 |
| 14 | W | October 31, 1991 | 4–3 | New York Islanders (1991–92) | 6–5–3 |

November

| Game | Result | Date | Score | Opponent | Record |
|---|---|---|---|---|---|
| 15 | L | November 2, 1991 | 3–4 | @ Minnesota North Stars (1991–92) | 6–6–3 |
| 16 | T | November 3, 1991 | 4–4 OT | Minnesota North Stars (1991–92) | 6–6–4 |
| 17 | W | November 7, 1991 | 4–2 | Quebec Nordiques (1991–92) | 7–6–4 |
| 18 | L | November 9, 1991 | 2–4 | @ Montreal Canadiens (1991–92) | 7–7–4 |
| 19 | W | November 10, 1991 | 3–0 | Hartford Whalers (1991–92) | 8–7–4 |
| 20 | W | November 14, 1991 | 3–0 | Toronto Maple Leafs (1991–92) | 9–7–4 |
| 21 | T | November 16, 1991 | 2–2 OT | @ Toronto Maple Leafs (1991–92) | 9–7–5 |
| 22 | W | November 17, 1991 | 5–1 | St. Louis Blues (1991–92) | 10–7–5 |
| 23 | L | November 19, 1991 | 1–4 | @ Detroit Red Wings (1991–92) | 10–8–5 |
| 24 | L | November 22, 1991 | 0–2 | @ Buffalo Sabres (1991–92) | 10–9–5 |
| 25 | L | November 27, 1991 | 2–6 | @ Edmonton Oilers (1991–92) | 10–10–5 |
| 26 | L | November 29, 1991 | 2–5 | @ Vancouver Canucks (1991–92) | 10–11–5 |

December

| Game | Result | Date | Score | Opponent | Record |
|---|---|---|---|---|---|
| 27 | L | December 1, 1991 | 2–3 OT | @ Winnipeg Jets (1991–92) | 10–12–5 |
| 28 | W | December 5, 1991 | 6–2 | Los Angeles Kings (1991–92) | 11–12–5 |
| 29 | W | December 7, 1991 | 5–2 | @ New York Islanders (1991–92) | 12–12–5 |
| 30 | W | December 8, 1991 | 7–2 | Minnesota North Stars (1991–92) | 13–12–5 |
| 31 | L | December 10, 1991 | 3–5 | @ Detroit Red Wings (1991–92) | 13–13–5 |
| 32 | T | December 14, 1991 | 1–1 OT | @ Philadelphia Flyers (1991–92) | 13–13–6 |
| 33 | T | December 15, 1991 | 4–4 OT | Philadelphia Flyers (1991–92) | 13–13–7 |
| 34 | W | December 19, 1991 | 6–4 | Montreal Canadiens (1991–92) | 14–13–7 |
| 35 | T | December 21, 1991 | 1–1 OT | @ New Jersey Devils (1991–92) | 14–13–8 |
| 36 | W | December 22, 1991 | 5–2 | St. Louis Blues (1991–92) | 15–13–8 |
| 37 | L | December 26, 1991 | 1–3 | @ St. Louis Blues (1991–92) | 15–14–8 |
| 38 | T | December 27, 1991 | 3–3 OT | Winnipeg Jets (1991–92) | 15–14–9 |
| 39 | L | December 29, 1991 | 4–6 | Detroit Red Wings (1991–92) | 15–15–9 |
| 40 | L | December 31, 1991 | 2–6 | @ Minnesota North Stars (1991–92) | 15–16–9 |

January

| Game | Result | Date | Score | Opponent | Record |
|---|---|---|---|---|---|
| 41 | L | January 2, 1992 | 3–4 | New York Rangers (1991–92) | 15–17–9 |
| 42 | W | January 4, 1992 | 4–2 | @ Toronto Maple Leafs (1991–92) | 16–17–9 |
| 43 | W | January 5, 1992 | 5–2 | Minnesota North Stars (1991–92) | 17–17–9 |
| 44 | W | January 9, 1992 | 2–0 | Toronto Maple Leafs (1991–92) | 18–17–9 |
| 45 | L | January 10, 1992 | 2–6 | @ Winnipeg Jets (1991–92) | 18–18–9 |
| 46 | W | January 12, 1992 | 4–2 | Washington Capitals (1991–92) | 19–18–9 |
| 47 | T | January 14, 1992 | 1–1 OT | @ Philadelphia Flyers (1991–92) | 19–18–10 |
| 48 | W | January 16, 1992 | 4–0 | Toronto Maple Leafs (1991–92) | 20–18–10 |
| 49 | W | January 23, 1992 | 4–2 | Quebec Nordiques (1991–92) | 21–18–10 |
| 50 | W | January 25, 1992 | 2–0 | @ Minnesota North Stars (1991–92) | 22–18–10 |
| 51 | W | January 27, 1992 | 4–3 OT | @ Calgary Flames (1991–92) | 23–18–10 |
| 52 | W | January 29, 1992 | 4–3 | @ Edmonton Oilers (1991–92) | 24–18–10 |
| 53 | L | January 30, 1992 | 1–4 | @ Vancouver Canucks (1991–92) | 24–19–10 |

February

| Game | Result | Date | Score | Opponent | Record |
|---|---|---|---|---|---|
| 54 | L | February 1, 1992 | 0–2 | @ Los Angeles Kings (1991–92) | 24–20–10 |
| 55 | L | February 5, 1992 | 2–5 | @ San Jose Sharks (1991–92) | 24–21–10 |
| 56 | W | February 8, 1992 | 3–1 | @ St. Louis Blues (1991–92) | 25–21–10 |
| 57 | T | February 13, 1992 | 2–2 OT | Los Angeles Kings (1991–92) | 25–21–11 |
| 58 | T | February 16, 1992 | 5–5 OT | Calgary Flames (1991–92) | 25–21–12 |
| 59 | T | February 20, 1992 | 4–4 OT | New Jersey Devils (1991–92) | 25–21–13 |
| 60 | L | February 22, 1992 | 1–2 | @ Detroit Red Wings (1991–92) | 25–22–13 |
| 61 | W | February 23, 1992 | 4–2 | St. Louis Blues (1991–92) | 26–22–13 |
| 62 | L | February 25, 1992 | 1–4 | @ New York Rangers (1991–92) | 26–23–13 |
| 63 | W | February 27, 1992 | 4–2 | Detroit Red Wings (1991–92) | 27–23–13 |
| 64 | L | February 29, 1992 | 5–6 OT | @ Toronto Maple Leafs (1991–92) | 27–24–13 |

March

| Game | Result | Date | Score | Opponent | Record |
|---|---|---|---|---|---|
| 65 | W | March 1, 1992 | 3–1 | @ Buffalo Sabres (1991–92) | 28–24–13 |
| 66 | T | March 5, 1992 | 4–4 OT | New York Islanders (1991–92) | 28–24–14 |
| 67 | W | March 7, 1992 | 2–1 | @ Boston Bruins (1991–92) | 29–24–14 |
| 68 | W | March 8, 1992 | 4–0 | Boston Bruins (1991–92) | 30–24–14 |
| 69 | W | March 10, 1992 | 5–1 | San Jose Sharks (1991–92) | 31–24–14 |
| 70 | L | March 11, 1992 | 1–7 | @ New York Rangers (1991–92) | 31–25–14 |
| 71 | L | March 15, 1992 | 3–4 | Pittsburgh Penguins (1991–92) | 31–26–14 |
| 72 | W | March 19, 1992 | 4–1 | Minnesota North Stars (1991–92) | 32–26–14 |
| 73 | W | March 21, 1992 | 3–1 | @ Toronto Maple Leafs (1991–92) | 33–26–14 |
| 74 | L | March 22, 1992 | 2–6 | Buffalo Sabres (1991–92) | 33–27–14 |
| 75 | W | March 26, 1992 | 5–4 OT | @ Quebec Nordiques (1991–92) | 34–27–14 |
| 76 | W | March 28, 1992 | 3–1 | @ Hartford Whalers (1991–92) | 35–27–14 |
| 77 | W | March 29, 1992 | 5–1 | Toronto Maple Leafs (1991–92) | 36–27–14 |
| 78 | T | March 31, 1992 | 3–3 OT | @ Detroit Red Wings (1991–92) | 36–27–15 |

April

| Game | Result | Date | Score | Opponent | Record |
|---|---|---|---|---|---|
| 79 | L | April 12, 1992 | 1–2 | Detroit Red Wings (1991–92) | 36–28–15 |
| 80 | L | April 14, 1992 | 3–5 | @ St. Louis Blues (1991–92) | 36–29–15 |

Legend: Win (2 points) Loss (0 points) Tie (1 point)

== Player statistics ==
=== Skaters ===
Note: GP = Games played; G = Goals; A = Assists; Pts = Points; +/- = Plus/minus; PIM = Penalty minutes

| Player | GP | G | A | Pts | +/- | PIM |
|---|---|---|---|---|---|---|
| Jeremy Roenick | 80 | 53 | 50 | 103 | +23 | 98 |
| Steve Larmer | 80 | 29 | 45 | 74 | +10 | 65 |
| Michel Goulet | 75 | 22 | 41 | 63 | +20 | 69 |
| Chris Chelios | 80 | 9 | 47 | 56 | +24 | 245 |
| Brent Sutter | 61 | 18 | 32 | 50 | -5 | 30 |
| Dirk Graham | 80 | 17 | 30 | 47 | -5 | 89 |

=== Goaltenders ===
Note: GP = Games played; TOI = Time on ice (minutes); W = Wins; L = Losses; OT = Overtime losses; GA = Goals against; SO = Shutouts; SV% = Save percentage; GAA = Goals against average

| Player | GP | TOI | W | L | OT | GA | SO | SV% | GAA |

== Playoffs ==
The Blackhawks began the playoffs against their rival the St. Louis Blues. After splitting the first two in Chicago, the Hawks would go on the road and lose a thriller in double-OT to find themselves down 1–2. The Blackhawks would win the last three games to close out the Blues in six games, and started a playoff winning streak

Apr 18, 1992 - CHI 3-STL 1

Apr 20, 1992 - CHI 3-STL 5

Apr 22, 1992 - STL 5-CHI 4 (OT)

Apr 24, 1992 - STL 3-CHI 5

Apr 26, 1992 - CHI 6-STL 4

Apr 28, 1992 - STL 1-CHI 2

The Blackhawks then took on the Detroit Red Wings, and kept the winning streak going by sweeping the Red Wings to advance to the Campbell Conference Finals

May 2, 1992 - DET 1-CHI 2

May 4, 1992 - DET 1-CHI 3

May 6, 1992 - CHI 5-DET 4

May 8, 1992 - CHI 1-DET 0

=== Conference finals ===
In the Conference Final, the Blackhawks faced the Edmonton Oilers for the fourth time in ten years. The Oilers had won all three previous matchups in 1983, 1985, and 1990. But this time around, with many of the players from the Oilers dynasty long gone, the Blackhawks kept their playoff winning streak going sweeping Edmonton in four games. The Blackhawks totally dominated the Oilers, outscoring them 21–8. The streak now reached 11 games (all with Belfour in net setting a Hawks playoff record for consecutive playoff wins by a goalie). The Hawks would be in the Stanley Cup Finals for the first time since 1973.

Campbell Conference
Chicago vs. Edmonton
| Date | Away | Home |
|---|---|---|---|
| May 16 | Edmonton 2 | 8 Chicago |
| May 18 | Edmonton 2 | 4 Chicago |
| May 20 | Chicago 4 | 3 Edmonton | OT |
| May 22 | Chicago 5 | 1 Edmonton |
Chicago wins series 4–0 and Clarence S. Campbell Bowl

=== Stanley Cup Finals ===
The Blackhawks were facing Mario Lemieux and the defending champion Pittsburgh Penguins, who also swept their way into the Finals beating the Bruins. Lemieux proved to be too much for the Hawks, sweeping them en route to his second Conn Smythe Trophy.

Pittsburgh vs. Chicago
| Date | Away | Score | Home | Score |
|---|---|---|---|---|
| Tue, May 26 | Chicago | 4 | Pittsburgh | 5 |
| Thu, May 28 | Chicago | 1 | Pittsburgh | 3 |
| Sat, May 30 | Pittsburgh | 1 | Chicago | 0 |
| Mon, June 1 | Pittsburgh | 6 | Chicago | 5 |
Pittsburgh wins series 4–0 and Stanley Cup

==== Impact on the NBA Finals ====
The Chicago Bulls were in the NBA Finals in 1992, but were successful as they repeated as NBA champions, defeating the Portland Trail Blazers in six games. This was the only year that both the Bulls and the Blackhawks reached their respective league's finals in the same year.

== Awards and records ==
- Clarence S. Campbell Bowl
- Dominik Hasek, NHL All-Rookie Team

=== All-Star Game ===
- Ed Belfour, Starter, Clarence Campbell Conference
- Chris Chelios, Starter, Clarence Campbell Conference
- Jeremy Roenick, Reserve, Clarence Campbell Conference
