= 1991–92 St. Louis Blues season =

National Hockey League team season

1991–92 St. Louis Blues
- Division: 3rd Norris
- Conference: 5th Campbell
- 1991–92 record: 36–33–11
- Home record: 25–12–3
- Road record: 11–21–8
- Goals for: 279
- Goals against: 266

Team information
- General manager: Ron Caron
- Coach: Brian Sutter
- Captain: Garth Butcher
- Alternate captains: Brett Hull; Adam Oates (Oct.–Feb.); Ron Sutter (Feb.–Apr.)
- Arena: St. Louis Arena

Team leaders
- Goals: Brett Hull (70)
- Assists: Adam Oates (59)
- Points: Brett Hull (109)
- Penalty minutes: Kelly Chase (264)
- Plus/minus: Lee Norwood (+14)
- Wins: Curtis Joseph (27)
- Goals against average: Guy Hebert (2.93)

The 1991–92 St. Louis Blues season saw the Blues finish in third place in the Norris Division with a record of 36 wins, 33 losses, and 11 ties for 83 points. They lost the Division Semi-finals in six games to the Chicago Blackhawks.

Among the highlights of the season was the trade of Adam Oates and Brett Hull's third consecutive season with 70 goals, which is an NHL record.

== Off-season ==
Team captain Scott Stevens is taken by the New Jersey Devils, via arbitration ruling. Defenceman Garth Butcher is named team captain.

=== NHL draft ===
Round	Pick	Player	Position	School/Club team
2	27	Steve Staios	Defense	Niagara Falls Thunder (OHL)
3	64	Kyle Reeves	Right wing	Tri-City Americans (WHL)
3	65	Nathan LaFayette	Center	Cornwall Royals (OHL)
4	87	Grayden Reid	Center	Owen Sound Platers (OHL)
5	109	Jeff Callinan	Goaltender	University of Minnesota (CCHA)
6	131	Bruce Gardiner	Right wing	Colgate University (ECAC)
7	153	Terry Hollinger	Defense	Lethbridge Hurricanes (WHL)
8	175	Chris Kenady	Right wing	St. Paul Vulcans (USHL)
9	197	Jed Fiebelkorn	Right wing	Osseo High School (USHS-MN)
10	219	Chris MacKenzie	Left wing	Colgate University (ECAC)
11	241	Kevin Rappana	Defense	East High School (Duluth) (USHS-MN)
12	263	Mike Veisor	Goaltender	Springfield Olympics (EJHL)
S	27	Chris McGee	Forward	Babson College (NEWMAC)

== Regular season ==
=== Final standings ===
Norris Division
	GP	W	L	T	GF	GA	Pts
**Detroit Red Wings**	**80**	**43**	**25**	**12**	**320**	**256**	**98**
**Chicago Blackhawks**	**80**	**36**	**29**	**15**	**257**	**236**	**87**
**St. Louis Blues**	**80**	**36**	**33**	**11**	**279**	**266**	**83**
**Minnesota North Stars**	**80**	**32**	**42**	**6**	**246**	**278**	**70**
Toronto Maple Leafs	80	30	43	7	234	294	67

Campbell Conference
R		Div	GP	W	L	T	GF	GA	Pts
1	**Detroit Red Wings**	**NRS**	**80**	**43**	**25**	**12**	**320**	**256**	**98**
2	**Vancouver Canucks**	**SMY**	**80**	**42**	**26**	**12**	**285**	**250**	**96**
3	**Chicago Blackhawks**	**NRS**	**80**	**36**	**29**	**15**	**257**	**236**	**87**
4	**Los Angeles Kings**	**SMY**	**80**	**35**	**31**	**14**	**287**	**296**	**84**
5	**St. Louis Blues**	**NRS**	**80**	**36**	**33**	**11**	**279**	**266**	**83**
6	**Edmonton Oilers**	**SMY**	**80**	**36**	**34**	**10**	**295**	**297**	**82**
7	**Winnipeg Jets**	**SMY**	**80**	**33**	**32**	**15**	**251**	**244**	**81**
8	Calgary Flames	SMY	80	31	37	12	296	305	74
9	**Minnesota North Stars**	**NRS**	**80**	**32**	**42**	**6**	**246**	**278**	**70**
10	Toronto Maple Leafs	NRS	80	30	43	7	234	294	67
11	San Jose Sharks	SMY	80	17	58	5	219	359	39

Divisions: NRS – Norris, SMY – Smythe
bold – Qualified for playoffs

== Schedule and results ==
1991–92 regular season
October

Game	Result	Date	Score	Opponent	Record
1	L	October 5, 1991	2–7	@ New Jersey Devils (1991–92)	0–1–0
2	L	October 7, 1991	0–3	@ Toronto Maple Leafs (1991–92)	0–2–0
3	W	October 10, 1991	3–2 OT	Edmonton Oilers (1991–92)	1–2–0
4	W	October 12, 1991	6–3	San Jose Sharks (1991–92)	2–2–0
5	W	October 15, 1991	5–1	Toronto Maple Leafs (1991–92)	3–2–0
6	L	October 17, 1991	3–6	@ Detroit Red Wings (1991–92)	3–3–0
7	T	October 19, 1991	4–4 OT	Chicago Blackhawks (1991–92)	3–3–1
8	W	October 20, 1991	4–1	@ Chicago Blackhawks (1991–92)	4–3–1
9	W	October 24, 1991	6–5	Boston Bruins (1991–92)	5–3–1
10	T	October 26, 1991	2–2 OT	Calgary Flames (1991–92)	5–3–2
11	T	October 28, 1991	1–1 OT	@ Toronto Maple Leafs (1991–92)	5–3–3
12	T	October 30, 1991	2–2 OT	@ Edmonton Oilers (1991–92)	5–3–4

November

Game	Result	Date	Score	Opponent	Record
13	W	November 1, 1991	3–2	@ Vancouver Canucks (1991–92)	6–3–4
14	T	November 3, 1991	3–3 OT	@ Winnipeg Jets (1991–92)	6–3–5
15	L	November 5, 1991	3–4	Philadelphia Flyers (1991–92)	6–4–5
16	L	November 7, 1991	3–10	@ Detroit Red Wings (1991–92)	6–5–5
17	L	November 9, 1991	3–4	Hartford Whalers (1991–92)	6–6–5
18	L	November 10, 1991	4–6	@ Detroit Red Wings (1991–92)	6–7–5
19	W	November 14, 1991	2–1 OT	Winnipeg Jets (1991–92)	7–7–5
20	W	November 16, 1991	5–3	Minnesota North Stars (1991–92)	8–7–5
21	L	November 17, 1991	1–5	@ Chicago Blackhawks (1991–92)	8–8–5
22	W	November 20, 1991	5–2	Toronto Maple Leafs (1991–92)	9–8–5
23	L	November 23, 1991	0–3	New York Rangers (1991–92)	9–9–5
24	W	November 28, 1991	5–2	Quebec Nordiques (1991–92)	10–9–5
25	W	November 30, 1991	7–3	Detroit Red Wings (1991–92)	11–9–5

December

Game	Result	Date	Score	Opponent	Record
26	T	December 3, 1991	3–3 OT	@ Minnesota North Stars (1991–92)	11–9–6
27	L	December 4, 1991	2–5	@ Minnesota North Stars (1991–92)	11–10–6
28	W	December 7, 1991	6–1	Pittsburgh Penguins (1991–92)	12–10–6
29	T	December 10, 1991	7–7 OT	@ New York Islanders (1991–92)	12–10–7
30	W	December 11, 1991	6–3	@ Buffalo Sabres (1991–92)	13–10–7
31	W	December 14, 1991	4–2	@ Quebec Nordiques (1991–92)	14–10–7
32	L	December 16, 1991	2–4	@ Montreal Canadiens (1991–92)	14–11–7
33	W	December 19, 1991	4–0	San Jose Sharks (1991–92)	15–11–7
34	W	December 21, 1991	6–2	New York Islanders (1991–92)	16–11–7
35	L	December 22, 1991	2–5	@ Chicago Blackhawks (1991–92)	16–12–7
36	W	December 26, 1991	3–1	Chicago Blackhawks (1991–92)	17–12–7
37	L	December 28, 1991	2–5	@ Minnesota North Stars (1991–92)	17–13–7
38	L	December 31, 1991	3–4	@ Buffalo Sabres (1991–92)	17–14–7

January

Game	Result	Date	Score	Opponent	Record
39	W	January 2, 1992	6–1	Minnesota North Stars (1991–92)	18–14–7
40	L	January 4, 1992	2–6	Detroit Red Wings (1991–92)	18–15–7
41	L	January 6, 1992	2–3 OT	@ Toronto Maple Leafs (1991–92)	18–16–7
42	W	January 8, 1992	5–3	@ New York Rangers (1991–92)	19–16–7
43	L	January 9, 1992	3–4	@ New Jersey Devils (1991–92)	19–17–7
44	W	January 11, 1992	6–3	@ New York Islanders (1991–92)	20–17–7
45	L	January 14, 1992	1–6	Washington Capitals (1991–92)	20–18–7
46	T	January 16, 1992	6–6 OT	Montreal Canadiens (1991–92)	20–18–8
47	W	January 21, 1992	5–4	Buffalo Sabres (1991–92)	21–18–8
48	L	January 23, 1992	5–6	Los Angeles Kings (1991–92)	21–19–8
49	L	January 25, 1992	0–1 OT	Vancouver Canucks (1991–92)	21–20–8
50	T	January 28, 1992	3–3 OT	@ Los Angeles Kings (1991–92)	21–20–9
51	W	January 30, 1992	4–2	@ San Jose Sharks (1991–92)	22–20–9

February

Game	Result	Date	Score	Opponent	Record
52	L	February 1, 1992	1–4	@ Pittsburgh Penguins (1991–92)	22–21–9
53	L	February 2, 1992	1–5	@ Philadelphia Flyers (1991–92)	22–22–9
54	W	February 6, 1992	4–1	New Jersey Devils (1991–92)	23–22–9
55	L	February 8, 1992	1–3	Chicago Blackhawks (1991–92)	23–23–9
56	W	February 11, 1992	3–2	Los Angeles Kings (1991–92)	24–23–9
57	W	February 13, 1992	4–0	Boston Bruins (1991–92)	25–23–9
58	W	February 15, 1992	7–2	Calgary Flames (1991–92)	26–23–9
59	L	February 17, 1992	3–5	@ Detroit Red Wings (1991–92)	26–24–9
60	W	February 19, 1992	4–3	@ Winnipeg Jets (1991–92)	27–24–9
61	W	February 22, 1992	4–3	Toronto Maple Leafs (1991–92)	28–24–9
62	L	February 23, 1992	2–4	@ Chicago Blackhawks (1991–92)	28–25–9
63	W	February 25, 1992	5–2	@ Hartford Whalers (1991–92)	29–25–9
64	W	February 27, 1992	7–3	Washington Capitals (1991–92)	30–25–9
65	L	February 29, 1992	2–3	Detroit Red Wings (1991–92)	30–26–9

March

Game	Result	Date	Score	Opponent	Record
66	W	March 2, 1992	5–3	@ Vancouver Canucks (1991–92)	31–26–9
67	L	March 6, 1992	3–5	@ Edmonton Oilers (1991–92)	31–27–9
68	L	March 7, 1992	1–5	@ Calgary Flames (1991–92)	31–28–9
69	W	March 10, 1992	5–2	Minnesota North Stars (1991–92)	32–28–9
70	L	March 12, 1992	4–5	Detroit Red Wings (1991–92)	32–29–9
71	L	March 14, 1992	0–6	New York Rangers (1991–92)	32–30–9
72	L	March 17, 1992	4–6	@ Washington Capitals (1991–92)	32–31–9
73	W	March 19, 1992	4–1	@ Boston Bruins (1991–92)	33–31–9
74	T	March 21, 1992	3–3 OT	@ Montreal Canadiens (1991–92)	33–31–10
75	L	March 23, 1992	2–3	@ Toronto Maple Leafs (1991–92)	33–32–10
76	W	March 26, 1992	7–2	Hartford Whalers (1991–92)	34–32–10
77	L	March 28, 1992	2–3	Toronto Maple Leafs (1991–92)	34–33–10

April

Game	Result	Date	Score	Opponent	Record
78	T	April 12, 1992	1–1 OT	@ Minnesota North Stars (1991–92)	34–33–11
79	W	April 14, 1992	5–3	Chicago Blackhawks (1991–92)	35–33–11
80	W	April 16, 1992	5–3	Minnesota North Stars (1991–92)	36–33–11

Legend: Win (2 points) Loss (0 points) Tie (1 point)

== Player statistics ==
=== Regular season ===
Scoring

Player	Pos	GP	G	A	Pts	PIM	+/-	PPG	SHG	GWG
Brett Hull	RW	73	70	39	109	48	-2	20	5	9
Brendan Shanahan	LW	80	33	36	69	171	-3	13	0	2
Adam Oates	C	54	10	59	69	12	-4	3	0	3
Nelson Emerson	RW	79	23	36	59	66	-5	3	0	2
Jeff Brown	D	80	20	39	59	38	8	10	0	2
Ron Sutter	C	68	19	27	46	91	9	5	4	1
Dave Christian	RW	78	20	24	44	41	2	1	3	3
Craig Janney	C	25	6	30	36	2	5	3	0	1
Paul Cavallini	D	66	10	25	35	95	7	3	1	2
Bob Bassen	C	79	7	25	32	167	12	0	0	1
Ron Wilson	C	64	12	17	29	46	10	5	2	2
Rich Sutter	RW	77	9	16	25	107	7	0	1	3
Dave Lowry	LW	75	7	13	20	77	-11	0	0	1
Garth Butcher	D	68	5	15	20	189	5	0	0	0
Rick Zombo	D	64	3	15	18	46	4	0	0	0
Gino Cavallini	LW	48	9	7	16	40	-8	0	0	2
Michel Mongeau	C	36	3	12	15	6	-2	2	0	0
Lee Norwood	D	44	3	11	14	94	14	1	0	1
Murray Baron	D	67	3	8	11	94	-3	0	0	0
Curtis Joseph	G	60	0	9	9	12	0	0	0	0
Stephane Quintal	D	26	0	6	6	32	-3	0	0	0
Philippe Bozon	LW	9	1	3	4	4	5	0	0	0
Darin Kimble	RW	46	1	3	4	166	-3	0	0	0
Kelly Chase	RW	46	1	2	3	264	-6	0	0	0
Curt Giles	D	13	1	1	2	8	-3	0	0	0
Bret Hedican	D	4	1	0	1	0	1	0	0	0
David Mackey	LW	19	1	0	1	49	-4	0	0	1
Jason Marshall	D	2	1	0	1	4	0	0	0	0
Denny Felsner	LW	3	0	1	1	0	0	0	0	0
Guy Hebert	G	13	0	1	1	0	0	0	0	0
Dominic Lavoie	D	6	0	1	1	10	-3	0	0	0
Mario Marois	D	17	0	1	1	38	-3	0	0	0
Rob Robinson	D	22	0	1	1	8	-4	0	0	0
Ron Hoover	C	1	0	0	0	0	0	0	0	0
Pat Jablonski	G	10	0	0	0	4	0	0	0	0
Vincent Riendeau	G	3	0	0	0	0	0	0	0	0
Randy Skarda	D	1	0	0	0	0	0	0	0	0

Goaltending

Player	MIN	GP	W	L	T	GA	GAA	SO	SA	SV	SV%
Curtis Joseph	3494	60	27	20	10	175	3.01	2	1953	1778	.910
Guy Hebert	738	13	5	5	1	36	2.93	0	393	357	.908
Pat Jablonski	468	10	3	6	0	38	4.87	0	259	221	.853
Vincent Riendeau	157	3	1	2	0	11	4.20	0	96	85	.885
Team:	4857	80	36	33	11	260	3.21	2	2701	2441	.904

=== Playoffs ===
Scoring

Player	Pos	GP	G	A	Pts	PIM	+/-	PPG	SHG	GWG
Brett Hull	RW	6	4	4	8	4	2	1	1	1
Nelson Emerson	RW	6	3	3	6	21	0	2	0	0
Craig Janney	C	6	0	6	6	0	-4	0	0	0
Brendan Shanahan	LW	6	2	3	5	14	0	1	0	0
Ron Sutter	C	6	1	3	4	8	-1	1	0	0
Dave Christian	RW	4	3	0	3	0	-1	0	0	0
Jeff Brown	D	6	2	1	3	2	-3	0	0	1
Garth Butcher	D	5	1	2	3	16	3	0	0	0
Stephane Quintal	D	4	1	2	3	6	0	1	0	0
Curt Giles	D	3	1	1	2	0	-2	1	0	0
Bob Bassen	C	6	0	2	2	4	0	0	0	0
Rick Zombo	D	6	0	2	2	12	-2	0	0	0
Philippe Bozon	LW	6	1	0	1	27	-2	0	0	0
Paul Cavallini	D	4	0	1	1	6	0	0	0	0
Curtis Joseph	G	6	0	1	1	0	0	0	0	0
Dave Lowry	LW	6	0	1	1	20	0	0	0	0
Lee Norwood	D	1	0	1	1	0	0	0	0	0
Ron Wilson	C	6	0	1	1	0	3	0	0	0
Murray Baron	D	2	0	0	0	2	-1	0	0	0
Kelly Chase	RW	1	0	0	0	7	0	0	0	0
Denny Felsner	LW	1	0	0	0	0	0	0	0	0
Bret Hedican	D	5	0	0	0	0	1	0	0	0
Darin Kimble	RW	5	0	0	0	7	-1	0	0	0
David Mackey	LW	1	0	0	0	0	0	0	0	0
Rich Sutter	RW	6	0	0	0	8	-3	0	0	0

Goaltending

Player	MIN	GP	W	L	GA	GAA	SO	SA	SV	SV%
Curtis Joseph	379	6	2	4	23	3.64	0	217	194	.894
Team:	379	6	2	4	23	3.64	0	217	194	.894

Note:

Pos = Position;GP = Games played; G = Goals; A = Assists; Pts = Points; PIM = Penalty minutes; +/- = Plus/minus; PPG = Power-play goals; SHG = Short-handed goals; GWG = Game-winning goals
Pos = Position;GP = Games played; Min, TOI = Minutes played; W = Wins; L = Losses; T,T/OT = Ties; OTL = Overtime losses; GA = Goals-against; GAA = Goals-against average; SO = Shutouts; SA = Shots against; SV = Shots saved;SV% = Save percentage;
