= 1991–92 Los Angeles Kings season =

National Hockey League team season

1991–92 Los Angeles Kings
- Division: 2nd Smythe
- Conference: 4th Campbell
- 1991–92 record: 35–31–14
- Home record: 20–11–9
- Road record: 15–20–5
- Goals for: 287
- Goals against: 296

Team information
- General manager: Rogatien Vachon
- Coach: Tom Webster
- Captain: Wayne Gretzky
- Alternate captains: Larry Robinson; Dave Taylor
- Arena: Great Western Forum

Team leaders
- Goals: Luc Robitaille (44)
- Assists: Wayne Gretzky (90)
- Points: Wayne Gretzky (121)
- Penalty minutes: Marty McSorley (268)
- Plus/minus: Jari Kurri (+24)
- Wins: Kelly Hrudey (26)
- Goals against average: Kelly Hrudey (3.37)

The 1991–92 Los Angeles Kings season, was the Kings' 25th season in the National Hockey League (NHL). It saw the Kings finishing second in the Smythe Division with a record of 35–31–14. However, they were eliminated in the first round of the Stanley Cup Playoffs by the Edmonton Oilers in six games.

== Offseason ==
In the Entry Draft, the Kings first pick, in the second round, was used to choose Guy Leveque from the Cornwall Royals of the Ontario Hockey League. Their first-round pick had been dealt to the Edmonton Oilers in the Wayne Gretzky trade.

== Pre-season ==
On September 27, 1991, the Kings played the New York Rangers in the first ever outdoor NHL game in Las Vegas, Nevada, at Caesars Palace. This was also the first NHL game in Las Vegas since 1968. The crowd on hand was 13,000 with the Kings beating the Rangers 5 to 2.

== Regular season ==
=== Season standings ===
Smythe Division
	GP	W	L	T	GF	GA	Pts
**Vancouver Canucks**	**80**	**42**	**26**	**12**	**285**	**250**	**96**
**Los Angeles Kings**	**80**	**35**	**31**	**14**	**287**	**250**	**84**
**Edmonton Oilers**	**80**	**36**	**34**	**10**	**295**	**297**	**82**
**Winnipeg Jets**	**80**	**33**	**32**	**15**	**251**	**244**	**81**
Calgary Flames	80	31	37	12	296	305	74
San Jose Sharks	80	17	58	5	219	359	39

Campbell Conference
R		Div	GP	W	L	T	GF	GA	Pts
1	**Detroit Red Wings**	**NRS**	**80**	**43**	**25**	**12**	**320**	**256**	**98**
2	**Vancouver Canucks**	**SMY**	**80**	**42**	**26**	**12**	**285**	**250**	**96**
3	**Chicago Blackhawks**	**NRS**	**80**	**36**	**29**	**15**	**257**	**236**	**87**
4	**Los Angeles Kings**	**SMY**	**80**	**35**	**31**	**14**	**287**	**296**	**84**
5	**St. Louis Blues**	**NRS**	**80**	**36**	**33**	**11**	**279**	**266**	**83**
6	**Edmonton Oilers**	**SMY**	**80**	**36**	**34**	**10**	**295**	**297**	**82**
7	**Winnipeg Jets**	**SMY**	**80**	**33**	**32**	**15**	**251**	**244**	**81**
8	Calgary Flames	SMY	80	31	37	12	296	305	74
9	**Minnesota North Stars**	**NRS**	**80**	**32**	**42**	**6**	**246**	**278**	**70**
10	Toronto Maple Leafs	NRS	80	30	43	7	234	294	67
11	San Jose Sharks	SMY	80	17	58	5	219	359	39

Divisions: NRS – Norris, SMY – Smythe
bold – Qualified for playoffs

== Schedule and results ==
1991–92 regular season
October

Game	Result	Date	Score	Opponent	Record
1	W	October 4, 1991	6–3	@ Winnipeg Jets (1991–92)	1–0–0
2	T	October 6, 1991	2–2 OT	@ Edmonton Oilers (1991–92)	1–0–1
3	W	October 8, 1991	6–3	Edmonton Oilers (1991–92)	2–0–1
4	L	October 10, 1991	1–7	Calgary Flames (1991–92)	2–1–1
5	T	October 12, 1991	3–3 OT	Winnipeg Jets (1991–92)	2–1–2
6	W	October 16, 1991	8–5	San Jose Sharks (1991–92)	3–1–2
7	W	October 19, 1991	5–2	Minnesota North Stars (1991–92)	4–1–2
8	L	October 22, 1991	2–5	@ New Jersey Devils (1991–92)	4–2–2
9	L	October 23, 1991	2–7	@ New York Rangers (1991–92)	4–3–2
10	W	October 26, 1991	4–2	@ New York Islanders (1991–92)	5–3–2
11	W	October 28, 1991	4–3	@ Detroit Red Wings (1991–92)	6–3–2
12	T	October 30, 1991	4–4 OT	@ Hartford Whalers (1991–92)	6–3–3
13	W	October 31, 1991	4–2	@ Boston Bruins (1991–92)	7–3–3

November

Game	Result	Date	Score	Opponent	Record
14	W	November 2, 1991	5–2	@ Toronto Maple Leafs (1991–92)	8–3–3
15	L	November 7, 1991	3–4	Vancouver Canucks (1991–92)	8–4–3
16	T	November 9, 1991	4–4 OT	Edmonton Oilers (1991–92)	8–4–4
17	L	November 11, 1991	2–6	@ Winnipeg Jets (1991–92)	8–5–4
18	L	November 12, 1991	2–8	@ Vancouver Canucks (1991–92)	8–6–4
19	T	November 14, 1991	2–2 OT	Buffalo Sabres (1991–92)	8–6–5
20	L	November 16, 1991	3–5	Detroit Red Wings (1991–92)	8–7–5
21	W	November 19, 1991	3–2 OT	@ San Jose Sharks (1991–92)	9–7–5
22	W	November 21, 1991	6–1	New York Rangers (1991–92)	10–7–5
23	W	November 23, 1991	6–4	San Jose Sharks (1991–92)	11–7–5
24	T	November 26, 1991	4–4 OT	Toronto Maple Leafs (1991–92)	11–7–6
25	L	November 28, 1991	3–5	@ Calgary Flames (1991–92)	11–8–6
26	L	November 30, 1991	1–4	New Jersey Devils (1991–92)	11–9–6

December

Game	Result	Date	Score	Opponent	Record
27	L	December 3, 1991	2–3 OT	@ San Jose Sharks (1991–92)	11–10–6
28	L	December 5, 1991	2–6	@ Chicago Blackhawks (1991–92)	11–11–6
29	L	December 7, 1991	5–7	@ Quebec Nordiques (1991–92)	11–12–6
30	W	December 12, 1991	2–1	Winnipeg Jets (1991–92)	12–12–6
31	T	December 14, 1991	4–4 OT	Vancouver Canucks (1991–92)	12–12–7
32	L	December 17, 1991	1–2	Minnesota North Stars (1991–92)	12–13–7
33	L	December 21, 1991	2–5	Detroit Red Wings (1991–92)	12–14–7
34	W	December 26, 1991	5–3	San Jose Sharks (1991–92)	13–14–7
35	W	December 28, 1991	9–4	@ Edmonton Oilers (1991–92)	14–14–7
36	L	December 29, 1991	2–6	@ Calgary Flames (1991–92)	14–15–7
37	L	December 31, 1991	3–5	Vancouver Canucks (1991–92)	14–16–7

January

Game	Result	Date	Score	Opponent	Record
38	W	January 2, 1992	5–3	Edmonton Oilers (1991–92)	15–16–7
39	W	January 4, 1992	7–3	Philadelphia Flyers (1991–92)	16–16–7
40	W	January 7, 1992	5–2	@ Pittsburgh Penguins (1991–92)	17–16–7
41	L	January 9, 1992	2–5	@ Philadelphia Flyers (1991–92)	17–17–7
42	L	January 10, 1992	4–7	@ Washington Capitals (1991–92)	17–18–7
43	L	January 12, 1992	2–5	@ New Jersey Devils (1991–92)	17–19–7
44	T	January 14, 1992	3–3 OT	San Jose Sharks (1991–92)	17–19–8
45	T	January 16, 1992	2–2 OT	Washington Capitals (1991–92)	17–19–9
46	T	January 22, 1992	3–3 OT	@ Minnesota North Stars (1991–92)	17–19–10
47	W	January 23, 1992	6–5	@ St. Louis Blues (1991–92)	18–19–10
48	W	January 25, 1992	4–3	Calgary Flames (1991–92)	19–19–10
49	T	January 28, 1992	3–3 OT	St. Louis Blues (1991–92)	19–19–11
50	L	January 30, 1992	1–4	New York Rangers (1991–92)	19–20–11

February

Game	Result	Date	Score	Opponent	Record
51	W	February 1, 1992	2–0	Chicago Blackhawks (1991–92)	20–20–11
52	L	February 4, 1992	1–2	New York Islanders (1991–92)	20–21–11
53	T	February 6, 1992	5–5 OT	Hartford Whalers (1991–92)	20–21–12
54	W	February 8, 1992	4–3	@ Pittsburgh Penguins (1991–92)	21–21–12
55	W	February 9, 1992	5–4	@ Buffalo Sabres (1991–92)	22–21–12
56	L	February 11, 1992	2–3	@ St. Louis Blues (1991–92)	22–22–12
57	T	February 13, 1992	2–2 OT	@ Chicago Blackhawks (1991–92)	22–22–13
58	W	February 15, 1992	6–3	Washington Capitals (1991–92)	23–22–13
59	W	February 17, 1992	6–3	Boston Bruins (1991–92)	24–22–13
60	L	February 19, 1992	3–4	@ Edmonton Oilers (1991–92)	24–23–13
61	L	February 21, 1992	7–9	@ Calgary Flames (1991–92)	24–24–13
62	W	February 23, 1992	4–2	@ Winnipeg Jets (1991–92)	25–24–13
63	W	February 25, 1992	4–3	@ Vancouver Canucks (1991–92)	26–24–13
64	W	February 27, 1992	4–2	Quebec Nordiques (1991–92)	27–24–13
65	W	February 29, 1992	5–3	Montreal Canadiens (1991–92)	28–24–13

March

Game	Result	Date	Score	Opponent	Record
66	W	March 3, 1992	4–1	Philadelphia Flyers (1991–92)	29–24–13
67	W	March 4, 1992	4–3	@ San Jose Sharks (1991–92)	30–24–13
68	W	March 7, 1992	5–3	Pittsburgh Penguins (1991–92)	31–24–13
69	W	March 9, 1992	4–1	Toronto Maple Leafs (1991–92)	32–24–13
70	L	March 11, 1992	0–4	@ Hartford Whalers (1991–92)	32–25–13
71	L	March 14, 1992	2–5	@ Montreal Canadiens (1991–92)	32–26–13
72	L	March 15, 1992	1–5	@ Boston Bruins (1991–92)	32–27–13
73	W	March 17, 1992	5–4	Winnipeg Jets (1991–92)	33–27–13
74	L	March 19, 1992	2–8	Buffalo Sabres (1991–92)	33–28–13
75	W	March 21, 1992	5–2	Calgary Flames (1991–92)	34–28–13
76	L	March 26, 1992	2–7	@ Calgary Flames (1991–92)	34–29–13
77	L	March 27, 1992	4–6	@ Winnipeg Jets (1991–92)	34–30–13
78	T	March 29, 1992	2–2 OT	@ Edmonton Oilers (1991–92)	34–30–14

April

Game	Result	Date	Score	Opponent	Record
79	W	April 12, 1992	6–1	@ Vancouver Canucks (1991–92)	35–30–14
80	L	April 14, 1992	2–3	Vancouver Canucks (1991–92)	35–31–14

Legend: Win (2 points) Loss (0 points) Tie (1 point)

== Playoffs ==
The Kings lost in the Division Semi-finals to the Edmonton Oilers, four games to two.

April 18	Edmonton Oilers	3–1	Los Angeles Kings	Great Western Forum

April 20	Edmonton Oilers	5–8	Los Angeles Kings	Great Western Forum

April 22	Los Angeles Kings	3–4	Edmonton Oilers	Northlands Coliseum

April 24	Los Angeles Kings	4–3	Edmonton Oilers	Northlands Coliseum

April 26	Edmonton Oilers	5–2	Los Angeles Kings	Great Western Forum

April 28	Los Angeles Kings	0–3	Edmonton Oilers	Northlands Coliseum

Edmonton won series 4–2

== Player statistics ==
=== Forwards ===
Note: GP = Games played; G = Goals; A = Assists; Pts = Points; PIM = Penalties in minutes

Player	GP	G	A	Pts	PIM
Wayne Gretzky	74	31	90	121	34
Luc Robitaille	80	44	63	107	95
Tony Granato	80	39	29	68	187
Jari Kurri	73	23	37	60	24
Mike Donnelly	80	29	16	45	20
Bob Kudelski	80	22	21	43	42
Corey Millen	46	20	21	41	44
Tomas Sandstrom	49	17	22	39	70
Dave Taylor	77	10	19	29	63
John McIntyre	73	5	19	24	100
Jay Miller	67	4	7	11	249
Kyosti Karjalainen	28	1	8	9	12
Randy Gilhen	33	3	6	9	14
Scott Bjugstad	22	2	4	6	10
Sylvain Couturier	14	3	1	4	2
Jim Thomson	45	1	2	3	162
Francois Breault	6	1	0	1	30
Ilkka Sinisalo	3	0	1	1	2
Shawn McCosh	4	0	0	0	4
Sean Whyte	3	0	0	0	0

=== Defensemen ===
Note: GP = Games played; G= Goals; A = Assists; Pts = Points; PIM = Penalty minutes

Player	GP	G	A	Pts	PIM
Brian Benning	53	2	30	32	99
Marty McSorley	71	7	22	29	268
Charlie Huddy	56	4	19	23	43
Rob Blake	57	7	13	20	102
Peter Ahola	71	7	12	19	101
Larry Robinson	56	3	10	13	37
Tim Watters	37	0	7	7	92
Darryl Sydor	18	1	5	6	22
Paul Coffey	10	1	4	5	25
Brent Thompson	27	0	5	5	89
Jeff Chychrun	26	0	3	3	76
Rene Chapdelaine	16	0	1	1	10
Rod Buskas	5	0	0	0	11

=== Goaltending ===
Note: GP = Games played; W = Wins; L = Losses; T = Ties; SO = Shutouts; GAA = Goals against average

Player	GP	W	L	T	SO	GAA
Kelly Hrudey	60	26	17	13	1	3.37
Daniel Berthiaume	19	7	10	1	0	4.04
Steve Weeks	7	1	3	0	0	4.05
David Goverde	2	1	1	0	0	4.50

== Transactions ==
The Kings were involved in the following transactions during the 1991–92 season.

=== Trades ===
May 30, 1991	To Los Angeles Kings Jeff Chychrun; Jari Kurri	To Philadelphia Flyers Steve Duchesne; Steve Kasper; 4th round pick in 1991 - Aris Brimanis
June 22, 1991	To Los Angeles Kings Randy Gilhen; Charlie Huddy; Jim Thomson; 4th round pick in 1991 - Darryl Sydor	To Minnesota North Stars Todd Elik
October 28, 1991	To Los Angeles Kings Chris Norton; Future considerations	To Chicago Blackhawks Rod Buskas
November 29, 1991	To Los Angeles Kings Rick Lanz	To Chicago Blackhawks Cash
January 18, 1992	To Los Angeles Kings Future considerations	To Boston Bruins Daniel Berthiaume
February 18, 1992	To Los Angeles Kings Steve Weeks	To New York Islanders 7th round pick in 1992 - Steve O'Rourke
February 19, 1992	To Los Angeles Kings Paul Coffey	To Pittsburgh Penguins Jeff Chychrun; Brian Benning; 1st round pick in 1992 - Jason Bowen

=== Free agents lost ===
June 30, 1991	To Chicago Blackhawks John Tonelli
July 2, 1991	To Detroit Red Wings Micah Aivazoff
August 2, 1991	To Boston Bruins Dennis Smith
August 9, 1991	To San Jose Sharks Brian Lawton
September 17, 1991	To Montreal Canadiens Stéphane Richer

=== Lost in expansion draft ===
May 30, 1991	To Minnesota North Stars Jim Thomson

== Draft picks ==
Los Angeles's draft picks at the 1991 NHL entry draft held at the Buffalo Memorial Auditorium in Buffalo, New York.

Round	#	Player	Nationality	College/Junior/Club team (League)
2	42	Guy Leveque	Canada	Cornwall Royals (OHL)
4	79	Keith Redmond	Canada	Bowling Green University (CCHA)
4	81	Alexei Zhitnik	Soviet Union	Sokil Kyiv (USSR)
5	108	Pauli Jaks	Switzerland	HC Ambri-Piotta (Switzerland)
6	130	Brett Seguin	United States	Ottawa 67's (OHL)
7	152	Kelly Fairchild	United States	Grand Rapids High School (USHS-MN)
9	196	Craig Brown	Canada	Western Michigan University (CCHA)
10	218	Mattias Olsson	Sweden	Farjestad BK (Sweden)
11	240	Andre Boulianne	Canada	Longueuil College Francais (QPJHL)
12	262	Michael Gaul	Canada	St. Lawrence University (ECAC)
S	26	Brendan Creagh	United States	University of Vermont (Hockey East)

== See also ==
- 1991–92 NHL season
