= 1991–92 Calgary Flames season =

NHL team season

1991–92 Calgary Flames
- Division: 5th Smythe
- Conference: 8th Campbell
- 1991–92 record: 31–37–12
- Home record: 19–14–7
- Road record: 12–23–5
- Goals for: 296
- Goals against: 305

Team information
- General manager: Doug Risebrough
- Coach: Doug Risebrough; Guy Charron (interim)
- Captain: Joe Nieuwendyk
- Alternate captains: Al MacInnis; Joel Otto
- Arena: Olympic Saddledome
- Average attendance: 19,719

Team leaders
- Goals: Gary Roberts (53)
- Assists: Al MacInnis (57)
- Points: Gary Roberts (90)
- Penalty minutes: Ronnie Stern (338)
- Plus/minus: Gary Roberts (+32)
- Wins: Mike Vernon (24)
- Goals against average: Mike Vernon (3.58)

The 1991–92 Calgary Flames season was the 12th National Hockey League season in Calgary, 20th season overall for the franchise which was founded in 1972. This season represented the start of a new era for the Flames, as Cliff Fletcher, the only general manager the franchise had ever known, left the team to take up the same position with the Toronto Maple Leafs. Doug Risebrough, Fletcher's former assistant, took over the reins for the Flames.

Fletcher quickly took advantage of his former team, orchestrating one of the largest trades in NHL history, a ten-player mega deal that saw disgruntled forward Doug Gilmour go to the Leafs, along with Ric Nattress, Jamie Macoun, Rick Wamsley and Kent Manderville for former 50–goal scorer Gary Leeman, Michel Petit, Jeff Reese, Alexander Godynyuk and Craig Berube. The deal is often regarded as one of the most lopsided in NHL history, and helped transform both clubs, as the formerly inept Leafs quickly rose to contention, making two trips to the conference finals in 1993 and 1994. The deal marked the beginning of the Flames' decline, which saw them ultimately bottom out by missing the playoffs for seven straight seasons between 1996 and 2003.

Prior to the season, the Flames lost defenceman Rick Lessard to the San Jose Sharks in the 1991 NHL Dispersal and Expansion Drafts.

The Flames finished fifth in the Smythe Division, seven points behind the fourth-place Winnipeg Jets and out of the playoffs. It was the first time the Flames had missed the playoffs since 1975, when they were known as the Atlanta Flames and their first losing season since 1982–83 This would be the only season that the Flames would miss the playoffs between 1976 and 1996.

Individually, three Flames represented the Campbell Conference at the 1992 All-Star Game: Forwards Gary Roberts and Theoren Fleury, and defenceman Al MacInnis. Roberts' 53 goals tied him for third in the NHL, behind Brett Hull (70) and Kevin Stevens (54).

Fleury and MacInnis also represented Canada at the 1991 Canada Cup, winning the tournament. MacInnis was named a tournament all-star. Joel Otto and Gary Suter suited up for the Americans.

== Regular season ==
On November 4, 1991, the Flames were shut-out 4–0 by the New York Rangers at Madison Square Garden. The Flames had not been shut out in a regular-season game since Sunday, February 26, 1989, when they lost 1–0 on the road to the Winnipeg Jets. Prior to their loss in New York, the Flames had gone 188 consecutive regular season games without being shut-out.

The Flames' penalty-killing struggled during the regular season, as they most power-play goals (107) in the NHL. They were also the most penalized team in the league, being short-handed 489 times.

Following an 11–0 blowout loss to the Vancouver Canucks on March 1, GM Doug Risebrough resigned as head coach and elevated assistant Guy Charron to the role on an interim basis. Unfortunately by that point of the season, it was too late to make the playoffs and the Flames went 6–7–3 following the change.

The Flames finished 5th in the Smythe Division, seven points back of the 4th place Winnipeg Jets. As a result, the Flames missed the playoffs for the first time since their move to Calgary. The last time the franchise had missed the post season was in 1974–75 when the team was still known as the Atlanta Flames

=== Season standings ===
Smythe Division
	GP	W	L	T	GF	GA	Pts
**Vancouver Canucks**	**80**	**42**	**26**	**12**	**285**	**250**	**96**
**Los Angeles Kings**	**80**	**35**	**31**	**14**	**287**	**250**	**84**
**Edmonton Oilers**	**80**	**36**	**34**	**10**	**295**	**297**	**82**
**Winnipeg Jets**	**80**	**33**	**32**	**15**	**251**	**244**	**81**
Calgary Flames	80	31	37	12	296	305	74
San Jose Sharks	80	17	58	5	219	359	39

Campbell Conference
R		Div	GP	W	L	T	GF	GA	Pts
1	**Detroit Red Wings**	**NRS**	**80**	**43**	**25**	**12**	**320**	**256**	**98**
2	**Vancouver Canucks**	**SMY**	**80**	**42**	**26**	**12**	**285**	**250**	**96**
3	**Chicago Blackhawks**	**NRS**	**80**	**36**	**29**	**15**	**257**	**236**	**87**
4	**Los Angeles Kings**	**SMY**	**80**	**35**	**31**	**14**	**287**	**296**	**84**
5	**St. Louis Blues**	**NRS**	**80**	**36**	**33**	**11**	**279**	**266**	**83**
6	**Edmonton Oilers**	**SMY**	**80**	**36**	**34**	**10**	**295**	**297**	**82**
7	**Winnipeg Jets**	**SMY**	**80**	**33**	**32**	**15**	**251**	**244**	**81**
8	Calgary Flames	SMY	80	31	37	12	296	305	74
9	**Minnesota North Stars**	**NRS**	**80**	**32**	**42**	**6**	**246**	**278**	**70**
10	Toronto Maple Leafs	NRS	80	30	43	7	234	294	67
11	San Jose Sharks	SMY	80	17	58	5	219	359	39

Divisions: NRS – Norris, SMY – Smythe
bold – Qualified for playoffs

== Schedule and results ==
1991–92 regular season
October: 6–5–1 (home: 3–1–0; road: 3–4–1)

Game	Date	Visitor	Score	Home	OT	Record	Pts
1	October 4	Edmonton	2 – 9	Calgary		1–0–0	2
2	October 6	Calgary	3 – 5	Winnipeg		1–1–0	2
3	October 8	Calgary	3 – 4	San Jose		1–2–0	2
4	October 10	Calgary	7 – 1	Los Angeles		2–2–0	4
5	October 12	Calgary	1 – 3	Edmonton		2–3–0	4
6	October 15	Minnesota	3 – 6	Calgary		3–3–0	6
7	October 17	Toronto	4 – 6	Calgary		4–3–0	8
8	October 19	Calgary	2 – 5	Vancouver		4–4–0	8
9	October 22	Calgary	4 – 2	Minnesota		5–4–0	10
10	October 24	Calgary	5 – 2	Chicago		6–4–0	12
11	October 26	Calgary	2 – 2	St. Louis	OT	6–4–1	13
12	October 30	New Jersey	5 – 2	Calgary		6–5–1	13

November: 5–5–3 (home: 2–3–2; road: 3–2–1)

Game	Date	Visitor	Score	Home	OT	Record	Pts
13	November 1	Calgary	7 – 6	Winnipeg	OT	7–5–1	15
14	November 4	Calgary	0 – 4	NY Rangers		7–6–1	15
15	November 6	Calgary	3 – 2	Hartford		8–6–1	17
16	November 7	Calgary	4 – 4	Boston	OT	8–6–2	18
17	November 9	Calgary	6 – 1	Toronto		9–6–2	20
18	November 12	Detroit	5 – 4	Calgary	OT	9–7–2	20
19	November 14	Vancouver	2 – 2	Calgary	OT	9–7–3	21
20	November 16	Buffalo	5 – 4	Calgary		9–8–3	21
21	November 21	Vancouver	2 – 3	Calgary		10–8–3	23
22	November 22	Calgary	5 – 6	Vancouver	OT	10–9–3	23
23	November 25	Winnipeg	3 – 3	Calgary	OT	10–9–4	24
24	November 28	Los Angeles	3 – 5	Calgary		11–9–4	26
25	November 30	San Jose	2 – 1	Calgary		11–10–4	26

December: 5–7–1 (home: 4–1–1; road: 1–6–0)

Game	Date	Visitor	Score	Home	OT	Record	Pts
26	December 3	Calgary	2 – 5	Detroit		11–11–4	26
27	December 5	Calgary	3 – 6	New Jersey		11–12–4	26
28	December 7	Calgary	1 – 5	Montreal		11–13–4	26
29	December 8	Calgary	4 – 2	Buffalo		12–13–4	28
30	December 10	Calgary	1 – 4	Washington		12–14–4	28
31	December 14	Detroit	4 – 3	Calgary	OT	12–15–4	28
32	December 17	Winnipeg	4 – 7	Calgary		13–15–4	30
33	December 19	Quebec	5 – 5	Calgary	OT	13–15–5	31
34	December 21	Calgary	2 – 7	Winnipeg		13–16–5	31
35	December 23	Calgary	3 – 5	Edmonton		13–17–5	31
36	December 28	Philadelphia	1 – 5	Calgary		14–17–5	33
37	December 29	Los Angeles	2 – 6	Calgary		15–17–5	35
38	December 31	Montreal	2 – 3	Calgary	OT	16–17–5	37

January: 5–5–2 (home: 2–2–1; road: 3–3–1)

Game	Date	Visitor	Score	Home	OT	Record	Pts
39	January 4	Edmonton	3 – 2	Calgary		16–18–5	37
40	January 5	Calgary	3 – 2	Edmonton		17–18–5	39
41	January 8	San Jose	3 – 10	Calgary		18–18–5	41
42	January 10	Pittsburgh	5 – 7	Calgary		19–18–5	43
43	January 13	Calgary	2 – 2	Montreal	OT	19–18–6	44
44	January 14	Calgary	5 – 3	Quebec		20–18–6	46
45	January 16	Calgary	4 – 6	NY Rangers		20–19–6	46
46	January 22	NY Rangers	4 – 4	Calgary	OT	20–19–7	47
47	January 24	Calgary	3 – 2	San Jose		21–19–7	49
48	January 25	Calgary	3 – 4	Los Angeles		21–20–7	49
49	January 27	Chicago	3 – 4	Calgary	OT	21–21–7	49
50	January 30	Calgary	1 – 3	Boston		21–22–7	49

February: 4–7–2 (home: 3–3–1; road: 1–4–1)

Game	Date	Visitor	Score	Home	OT	Record	Pts
51	February 1	Calgary	2 – 5	Washington		21–23–7	49
52	February 2	Calgary	3 – 6	NY Islanders		21–24–7	49
53	February 5	Quebec	3 – 5	Calgary		22–24–7	51
54	February 7	Calgary	1 – 4	Winnipeg		22–25–7	51
55	February 11	NY Islanders	3 – 1	Calgary		22–26–7	51
56	February 13	Washington	4 – 4	Calgary	OT	22–26–8	52
57	February 15	Calgary	2 – 7	St. Louis		22–27–8	52
58	February 16	Calgary	5 – 5	Chicago	OT	22–27–9	53
59	February 19	Boston	4 – 6	Calgary		23–27–9	55
60	February 21	Los Angeles	7 – 9	Calgary		24–27–9	57
61	February 23	Calgary	4 – 2	San Jose		25–27–9	59
62	February 25	Buffalo	5 – 3	Calgary		25–28–9	59
63	February 27	Philadelphia	3 – 0	Calgary		25–29–9	59

March: 5–7–2 (home: 5–3–2; road: 0–4–0)

Game	Date	Visitor	Score	Home	OT	Record	Pts
64	March 1	Calgary	0 – 11	Vancouver		25–30–9	59
65	March 3	Pittsburgh	6 – 3	Calgary		25–31–9	59
66	March 5	Toronto	5 – 5	Calgary	OT	25–31–10	60
67	March 7	St. Louis	1 – 5	Calgary		26–31–10	62
68	March 10	Calgary	2 – 5	Pittsburgh		26–32–10	62
69	March 12	Calgary	4 – 5	Philadelphia	OT	26–33–10	62
70	March 14	Vancouver	6 – 4	Calgary		26–34–10	62
71	March 16	Hartford	4 – 3	Calgary		26–35–10	62
72	March 19	San Jose	1 – 3	Calgary		27–35–10	64
73	March 21	Calgary	2 – 5	Los Angeles		27–36–10	64
74	March 24	Edmonton	4 – 4	Calgary	OT	27–36–11	65
75	March 26	Los Angeles	2 – 7	Calgary		28–36–11	67
76	March 28	Minnesota	3 – 4	Calgary		29–36–11	69
77	March 31	Edmonton	2 – 5	Calgary		30–36–11	71

April: 1–1–1 (home: 0–1–0; road: 1–0–1)

Game	Date	Visitor	Score	Home	OT	Record	Pts
78	April 12	Winnipeg	4 – 3	Calgary		30–37–11	71
79	April 15	Calgary	4 – 3	San Jose		31–37–11	73
80	April 16	Calgary	4 – 4	Vancouver	OT	31–37–12	74

Legend: Win (2 points) Loss (0 points) Tie (1 point)

== Player statistics ==
=== Skaters ===
Note: GP = Games played; G = Goals; A = Assists; Pts = Points; PIM = Penalty minutes

		Regular season					Playoffs
Player	#	GP	G	A	Pts	PIM	GP	G	A	Pts	PIM
Gary Roberts	10	76	53	37	90	207	-	-	-	-	-
Al MacInnis	2	72	20	57	77	83	-	-	-	-	-
Theoren Fleury	14	80	33	40	73	133	-	-	-	-	-
Sergei Makarov	42	68	22	48	70	60	-	-	-	-	-
Joe Nieuwendyk	25	69	22	34	56	55	-	-	-	-	-
Gary Suter	20	70	12	43	55	128	-	-	-	-	-
Robert Reichel	26	70	20	34	54	32	-	-	-	-	-
Paul Ranheim	28	80	23	20	43	32	-	-	-	-	-
Doug Gilmour^{‡}	39	38	11	27	38	46	-	-	-	-	-
Joel Otto	29	78	13	21	34	161	-	-	-	-	-
Carey Wilson	33	42	11	12	23	37	-	-	-	-	-
Ron Stern	22	72	13	9	22	338	-	-	-	-	-
Marc Habscheid	17	46	7	11	18	42	-	-	-	-	-
Tomas Forslund	27	38	5	9	14	12	-	-	-	-	-
Jamie Macoun^{‡}	34	37	2	12	14	53	-	-	-	-	-
Michel Petit^{†}	7	36	3	10	13	79	-	-	-	-	-
Trent Yawney	18	47	4	9	13	45	-	-	-	-	-
Frank Musil	3	78	4	8	12	103	-	-	-	-	-
Gary Leeman^{†}	11	29	2	7	9	27	-	-	-	-	-
Mark Osiecki	55	50	2	7	9	24	-	-	-	-	-
Chris Lindberg	32	17	2	5	7	17	-	-	-	-	-
Mike Vernon	30	63	0	7	7	8	-	-	-	-	-
Craig Berube^{†}	23/16	36	1	4	5	155	-	-	-	-	-
Ric Nattress^{‡}	6	19	0	5	5	31	-	-	-	-	-
Paul Kruse	12	16	3	1	4	65	-	-	-	-	-
Martin Simard	13	21	1	3	4	119	-	-	-	-	-
Tim Hunter	19	30	1	3	4	167	-	-	-	-	-
Tim Sweeney	7	11	1	2	3	4	-	-	-	-	-
Neil Sheehy	15	35	1	2	3	119	-	-	-	-	-
Nevin Markwart^{†}	23	10	2	1	3	25	-	-	-	-	-
Greg Smyth^{†}	6	7	1	1	2	15	-	-	-	-	-
Stephane Matteau	23	4	1	0	1	19	-	-	-	-	-
Richard Zemlak	21	5	0	1	1	42	-	-	-	-	-
Alexander Godynyuk^{†}	21	6	0	1	1	4	-	-	-	-	-
Jeff Reese^{†}	35	12	0	1	1	12	-	-	-	-	-
Jim Kyte	4	21	0	1	1	107	-	-	-	-	-
Darryl Olsen	32	1	0	0	0	0	-	-	-	-	-
Scott Sharples	1	1	0	0	0	0	-	-	-	-	-
Trevor Kidd	37	2	0	0	0	0	-	-	-	-	-
Kevan Guy	5	3	0	0	0	2	-	-	-	-	-
Todd Harkins	37	5	0	0	0	7	-	-	-	-	-
Rick Wamsley^{‡}	31	9	0	0	0	0	-	-	-	-	-
Rich Chernomaz	16	11	0	0	0	6	-	-	-	-	-

^{†}Denotes player spent time with another team before joining Calgary. Stats reflect time with the Flames only.

=== Goaltenders ===
Note: GP = Games played; TOI = Time on ice (minutes); W = Wins; L = Losses; OT = Overtime/shootout losses; GA = Goals against; SO = Shutouts; GAA = Goals against average

		Regular season								Playoffs
Player	#	GP	TOI	W	L	T	GA	SO	GAA	GP	TOI	W	L	GA	SO	GAA
Mike Vernon	30	63	3640	24	30	9	217	2	3.58	-	-	-	-	-	-	-
Scott Sharples	1	1	65	0	0	1	4	0	3.69	-	-	-	-	-	-	-
Jeff Reese^{†}	35	12	587	3	2	2	37	1	3.78	-	-	-	-	-	-	-
Trevor Kidd	37	2	120	1	1	0	8	0	4.00	-	-	-	-	-	-	-
Rick Wamsley^{‡}	31	9	457	3	4	0	34	0	4.46	-	-	-	-	-	-	-

^{†}Denotes player spent time with another team before joining Calgary. Stats reflect time with the Flames only.
^{‡}Traded mid-season

== Transactions ==
The Flames were involved in the following transactions during the 1991–92 season.

=== Trades ===
August 26, 1991	To Calgary Flames 6th round pick in 1991	To Hartford Whalers Paul Fenton
January 2, 1992	To Calgary Flames Gary Leeman; Alexander Godynyuk; Jeff Reese; Michel Petit; Craig Berube	To Toronto Maple Leafs Doug Gilmour; Jamie Macoun; Ric Nattress; Rick Wamsley; Kent Manderville

=== Free agents ===
Player / Former team	Player / New team

== Draft picks ==
Calgary's picks at the 1991 NHL entry draft, held in Buffalo, New York.

Rnd	Pick	Player	Nationality	Position	Team (league)	NHL statistics				
Rnd	Pick	Player	Nationality	Position	Team (league)	GP	G	A	Pts	PIM
1	19	Niklas Sundblad	Sweden	RW	AIK (SEL)	2	0	0	0	0
2	41	Francois Groleau	Canada	D	Shawinigan Cataractes (QMJHL)	8	0	1	1	6
3	52	Sandy McCarthy	Canada	RW	Laval Titan (QMJHL)	736	72	76	148	1534
3	63	Brian Caruso	Canada	LW	UMD (WCHA)					
4	85	Steve Magnusson	United States	C	Minnesota (WCHA)					
5	107	Jerome Butler	United States	G	UMD (WCHA)					
6	129	Bob Marshall	Canada	D	Miami University (CCHA)					
7	140	Matt Hoffman	United States	C	Oshawa Generals (OHL)					
7	151	Kelly Harper	Canada	RW	Michigan State (CCHA)					
8	173	David St. Pierre	Canada	C	Longueuil (QMJHL)					
9	195	David Struch	Canada	C	Saskatoon Blades (WHL)	4	0	0	0	4
10	217	Sergei Zolotov	Soviet Union	LW	Krylya Sovetov (USSR)					
11	239	Marko Jantunen	Finland	RW	Reipas Lahti (FNL)	3	0	0	0	0
12	261	Andrei Trefilov	Soviet Union	G	HC Dynamo Moscow (USSR)	54	12–25–4, 3.45GAA			
S	25	Dean Larson	Canada	C	N/A					

== See also ==
- 1991–92 NHL season
