= Matt Hervey =

American ice hockey player (born 1966)

- Born: May 16, 1966 (age 59) Whittier, California, U.S.
- Height: 5 ft 11 in (180 cm)
- Weight: 205 lb (93 kg; 14 st 9 lb)
- Position: Defense
- Shot: Right
- Played for: Winnipeg Jets; Boston Bruins; Tampa Bay Lightning
- NHL draft: Undrafted
- Playing career: 1987–1996

Matthew W. Hervey (born May 16, 1966) is an American former professional ice hockey defenseman.

== Early life ==
Hervey was born and raised in Whittier, California. Prior to turning professional, he played with the Langley Eagles, Victoria Cougars, Lethbridge Broncos, and Seattle Thunderbirds.

== Career ==
Hervey played 35 games in the National Hockey League with the Winnipeg Jets, Boston Bruins, and Tampa Bay Lightning. After leaving the NHL, Hervey played for the Atlanta Knights, Milwaukee Admirals, and Los Angeles Ice Dogs.

== Career statistics ==
			Regular season					Playoffs
Season	Team	League	GP	G	A	Pts	PIM	GP	G	A	Pts	PIM
1983–84	Victoria Cougars	WHL	61	4	19	23	89	22	1	3	4	43
1984–85	Victoria Cougars	WHL	14	1	3	4	17	—	—	—	—	—
1984–85	Lethbridge Broncos	WHL	54	3	9	12	88	4	0	1	1	14
1985–86	Lethbridge Broncos	WHL	60	9	17	26	110	10	3	4	7	30
1986–87	Seattle Thunderbirds	WHL	9	4	5	9	59	—	—	—	—	—
1987–88	Moncton Hawks	AHL	69	9	20	29	265	—	—	—	—	—
1988–89	Winnipeg Jets	NHL	2	0	0	0	4	—	—	—	—	—
1988–89	Moncton Hawks	AHL	73	8	28	36	295	10	1	2	3	42
1989–90	Moncton Hawks	AHL	47	3	13	16	168	—	—	—	—	—
1990–91	Moncton Hawks	AHL	71	4	28	32	132	7	0	1	1	23
1991–92	Boston Bruins	NHL	16	0	1	1	55	5	0	0	0	6
1991–92	Maine Mariners	AHL	36	1	7	8	47	—	—	—	—	—
1992–93	Tampa Bay Lightning	NHL	17	0	4	4	38	—	—	—	—	—
1992–93	Atlanta Knights	IHL	49	12	19	31	122	9	0	4	4	19
1993–94	Milwaukee Admirals	IHL	27	6	17	23	51	—	—	—	—	—
1994–95	Detroit Falcons	CoHL	4	1	4	5	15	—	—	—	—	—
1994–95	Milwaukee Admirals	IHL	28	4	5	9	63	14	2	1	3	13
1995–95	Los Angeles Ice Dogs	IHL	58	2	10	12	81	—	—	—	—	—
NHL totals			35	0	5	5	97	5	0	0	0	6
