= Scott Sharples =

Canadian ice hockey player

- Born: March 1, 1968 (age 57); Montreal, Quebec, Canada
- Height: 6 ft 0 in (183 cm)
- Weight: 180 lb (82 kg; 12 st 12 lb)
- Position: Goaltender
- Caught: Left
- Played for: Calgary Flames
- NHL draft: 184th overall, 1986; Calgary Flames
- Playing career: 1989–1993

Warren Scott Sharples (born March 1, 1968) is a Canadian former professional ice hockey goaltender. He played one game in the National Hockey League with the Calgary Flames during the 1991–92 season.

== Playing career ==
Sharples played junior hockey for the Penticton Knights of the BCJHL during the 1985-86 season when the Knights were crowned Centennial Cup Champions. He then played college hockey at the University of Michigan for the Wolverines, earning team MVP honours and top student-athlete twice. After turning professional, he played for the Calgary Flames in the NHL, the Salt Lake Golden Eagles in the IHL, the St. John's Maple Leafs in the AHL, and the Brantford Smoke in the Colonial Hockey League. He appeared in one NHL game, recording 36 saves in a 4–4 tie against the Vancouver Canucks on April 16, 1992.

== Career statistics ==
=== Regular season and playoffs ===
			Regular season									Playoffs
Season	Team	League	GP	W	L	T	MIN	GA	SO	GAA	SV%	GP	W	L	MIN	GA	SO	GAA	SV%
1985–86	Penticton Broncos	BCJHL	28	20	6	0	1522	94	0	3.71	—	—	—	—	—	—	—	—	—
1986–87	University of Michigan	CCHA	32	12	16	1	1728	148	1	5.14	.845	—	—	—	—	—	—	—	—
1987–88	University of Michigan	CCHA	33	18	15	0	1930	132	0	4.10	.877	—	—	—	—	—	—	—	—
1988–89	University of Michigan	CCHA	33	17	11	2	1887	116	0	3.69	.883	—	—	—	—	—	—	—	—
1989–90	University of Michigan	CCHA	39	20	10	6	2165	117	0	3.24	.886	—	—	—	—	—	—	—	—
1989–90	Salt Lake Golden Eagles	IHL	3	0	3	0	178	13	0	4.38	—	—	—	—	—	—	—	—	—
1990–91	Salt Lake Golden Eagles	IHL	37	21	11	1	2097	124	2	3.55	—	4	0	3	188	14	0	4.47	—
1991–92	Calgary Flames	NHL	1	0	0	0	65	4	0	3.69	.900	—	—	—	—	—	—	—	—
1991–92	Salt Lake Golden Eagles	IHL	35	9	18	4	1936	121	2	3.75	—	1	0	1	60	7	0	7.00	—
1992–93	St. John's Maple Leafs	AHL	25	9	8	3	1168	80	0	4.11	.879	1	0	0	7	0	0	0.00	1.000
1992–93	Brantford Smoke	CoHL	7	5	1	0	400	27	0	4.05	.878	—	—	—	—	—	—	—	—
NHL totals			1	0	0	1	65	4	0	4.00	.900	—	—	—	—	—	—	—	—

== See also ==
- List of players who played only one game in the NHL
