= 1991–92 Detroit Red Wings season =

Sports season

1991–92 Detroit Red Wings
- Norris Division champions
- Division: 1st Norris
- Conference: 1st Campbell
- 1991–92 record: 43–25–12
- Home record: 24–12–4
- Road record: 19–13–8
- Goals for: 320
- Goals against: 256

Team information
- General manager: Bryan Murray
- Coach: Bryan Murray
- Captain: Steve Yzerman
- Alternate captains: Gerard Gallant; Brad McCrimmon; Bob Probert
- Arena: Joe Louis Arena

Team leaders
- Goals: Steve Yzerman (45)
- Assists: Steve Yzerman (58)
- Points: Steve Yzerman (103)
- Penalty minutes: Bob Probert (276)
- Plus/minus: Paul Ysebaert (+44)
- Wins: Tim Cheveldae (38)
- Goals against average: Vincent Riendeau (1.38)

The 1991–92 Detroit Red Wings season was the Red Wings' 60th season, the 66th for the franchise. The Wings made it to the second round of the playoffs before losing to the Chicago Blackhawks. The Red Wings, along with the New York Rangers and Pittsburgh Penguins, had five 30-goal scorers. This was also the first season for the now-retired NHL legend Nicklas Lidstrom.

== Offseason ==
In the Entry Draft, the Wings picked Martin Lapointe in the first round, tenth overall. In the third round, the Wings picked their goaltender of the future, Chris Osgood.

== Regular season ==
The Red Wings led the NHL in short-handed goals scored, with 18.

=== Season standings ===
Norris Division
	GP	W	L	T	GF	GA	Pts
**Detroit Red Wings**	**80**	**43**	**25**	**12**	**320**	**256**	**98**
**Chicago Blackhawks**	**80**	**36**	**29**	**15**	**257**	**236**	**87**
**St. Louis Blues**	**80**	**36**	**33**	**11**	**279**	**266**	**83**
**Minnesota North Stars**	**80**	**32**	**42**	**6**	**246**	**278**	**70**
Toronto Maple Leafs	80	30	43	7	234	294	67

Campbell Conference
R		Div	GP	W	L	T	GF	GA	Pts
1	**Detroit Red Wings**	**NRS**	**80**	**43**	**25**	**12**	**320**	**256**	**98**
2	**Vancouver Canucks**	**SMY**	**80**	**42**	**26**	**12**	**285**	**250**	**96**
3	**Chicago Blackhawks**	**NRS**	**80**	**36**	**29**	**15**	**257**	**236**	**87**
4	**Los Angeles Kings**	**SMY**	**80**	**35**	**31**	**14**	**287**	**296**	**84**
5	**St. Louis Blues**	**NRS**	**80**	**36**	**33**	**11**	**279**	**266**	**83**
6	**Edmonton Oilers**	**SMY**	**80**	**36**	**34**	**10**	**295**	**297**	**82**
7	**Winnipeg Jets**	**SMY**	**80**	**33**	**32**	**15**	**251**	**244**	**81**
8	Calgary Flames	SMY	80	31	37	12	296	305	74
9	**Minnesota North Stars**	**NRS**	**80**	**32**	**42**	**6**	**246**	**278**	**70**
10	Toronto Maple Leafs	NRS	80	30	43	7	234	294	67
11	San Jose Sharks	SMY	80	17	58	5	219	359	39

Divisions: NRS – Norris, SMY – Smythe
bold – Qualified for playoffs

== Schedule and results ==
1991–92 regular season
October

Game	Date	Visitor	Score	Home	OT	Record	Points
1	October 3	Detroit	3 – 3	Chicago	*	0–0–1	1
2	October 5	Detroit	5 – 8	Toronto		0–1–1	1
3	October 10	Montreal	4 – 1	Detroit		0–2–1	1
4	October 12	Detroit	2 – 3	Minnesota		0–3–1	1
5	October 15	Edmonton	1 – 3	Detroit		1–3–1	3
6	October 17	St. Louis	3 – 6	Detroit		2–3–1	5
7	October 19	Detroit	6 – 1	Quebec		3–3–1	7
8	October 23	Winnipeg	3 – 2	Detroit		3–4–1	7
9	October 25	Toronto	0 – 4	Detroit		4–4–1	9
10	October 26	Detroit	1 – 6	Toronto		4–5–1	9
11	October 28	Los Angeles	4 – 3	Detroit		4–6–1	9
12	October 30	Buffalo	1 – 3	Detroit		5–6–1	11

November

Game	Date	Visitor	Score	Home	OT	Record	Points
13	November 1	Hartford	5 – 8	Detroit		6–6–1	13
14	November 2	Detroit	1 – 4	Boston		6–7–1	13
15	November 5	Minnesota	3 – 2	Detroit		6–8–1	13
16	November 7	St. Louis	3 – 10	Detroit		7–8–1	15
17	November 8	Detroit	5 – 4	Washington		8–8–1	17
18	November 10	St. Louis	4 – 6	Detroit		9–8–1	19
19	November 12	Detroit	5 – 4	Calgary	*	10–8–1	21
20	November 14	Detroit	3 – 3	San Jose	*	10–8–2	22
21	November 16	Detroit	5 – 3	Los Angeles		11–8–2	24
22	November 19	Chicago	1 – 4	Detroit		12–8–2	26
23	November 22	Minnesota	3 – 4	Detroit		13–8–2	28
24	November 23	Detroit	2 – 2	Minnesota	*	13–8–3	29
25	November 25	Washington	4 – 5	Detroit		14–8–3	31
26	November 30	Detroit	3 – 7	St. Louis		14–9–3	31

December

Game	Date	Visitor	Score	Home	OT	Record	Points
27	December 3	Calgary	2 – 5	Detroit		15–9–3	33
28	December 6	NY Rangers	5 – 6	Detroit	*	16–9–3	35
29	December 7	Detroit	2 – 2	New Jersey	*	16–9–4	36
30	December 10	Chicago	3 – 5	Detroit		17–9–4	38
31	December 12	Quebec	1 – 4	Detroit		18–9–4	40
32	December 14	Detroit	4 – 3	Calgary	*	19–9–4	42
33	December 15	Detroit	4 – 1	Edmonton		20–9–4	44
34	December 17	Detroit	1 – 2	Vancouver		20–10–4	44
35	December 21	Detroit	5 – 2	Los Angeles		21–10–4	46
36	December 28	Detroit	5 – 4	Toronto		22–10–4	48
37	December 29	Detroit	6 – 4	Chicago		23–10–4	50
38	December 31	Boston	5 – 3	Detroit		23–11–4	50

January

Game	Date	Visitor	Score	Home	OT	Record	Points
39	January 3	Toronto	4 – 6	Detroit		24–11–4	52
40	January 4	Detroit	6 – 2	St. Louis		25–11–4	54
41	January 7	NY Islanders	5 – 2	Detroit		25–12–4	54
42	January 9	Minnesota	4 – 9	Detroit		26–12–4	56
43	January 11	Edmonton	5 – 5	Detroit	*	26–12–5	57
44	January 14	Detroit	2 – 6	NY Islanders		26–13–5	57
45	January 16	Pittsburgh	3 – 3	Detroit	*	26–13–6	58
46	January 21	Philadelphia	3 – 7	Detroit		27–13–6	60
47	January 23	Vancouver	3 – 1	Detroit		27–14–6	60
48	January 25	Detroit	7 – 0	New Jersey		28–14–6	62
49	January 29	Buffalo	4 – 4	Detroit	*	28–14–7	63
50	January 31	New Jersey	6 – 3	Detroit		28–15–7	63

February

Game	Date	Visitor	Score	Home	OT	Record	Points
51	February 1	Detroit	3 - 4	Montreal	*	28-16-7	63
52	February 3	Detroit	4 - 4	Pittsburgh	*	28-16-8	64
53	February 5	Washington	1 - 4	Detroit		29-16-8	66
54	February 7	Toronto	4 - 3	Detroit		29-17-8	66
55	February 9	Detroit	5 - 5	NY Rangers	*	29-17-9	67
56	February 11	Detroit	3 - 4	Toronto		29-18-9	67
57	February 12	Detroit	9 - 4	Buffalo		30-18-9	69
58	February 15	San Jose	1 - 11	Detroit		31-18-9	71
59	February 17	St. Louis	3 - 5	Detroit		32-18-9	73
60	February 20	Toronto	2 - 3	Detroit		33-18-9	75
61	February 22	Chicago	1 - 2	Detroit		34-18-9	77
62	February 23	Detroit	4 - 0	Hartford		35-18-9	79
63	February 27	Detroit	2 - 4	Chicago		35-19-9	79
64	February 29	Detroit	3 - 2	St. Louis		36-19-9	81

March

Game	Date	Visitor	Score	Home	OT	Record	Points
65	March 3	Winnipeg	4 - 3	Detroit		36-20-9	81
66	March 5	Minnesota	4 - 2	Detroit		36-21-9	81
67	March 7	Detroit	4 - 4	Quebec	*	36-21-10	82
68	March 8	Detroit	1 - 4	Montreal		36-22-10	82
69	March 12	Detroit	5 - 4	St. Louis		37-22-10	84
70	March 14	Detroit	1 - 4	Minnesota		37-23-10	84
71	March 15	Detroit	1 - 1	Winnipeg	*	37-23-11	85
72	March 17	Detroit	5 - 4	San Jose		38-23-11	87
73	March 20	NY Rangers	4 - 2	Detroit		38-24-11	87
74	March 22	Philadelphia	4 - 3	Detroit		38-25-11	87
75	March 24	Pittsburgh	2 - 4	Detroit		39-25-11	89
76	March 28	Vancouver	1 - 3	Detroit		40-25-11	91
77	March 29	Detroit	6 - 2	Vancouver		41-25-11	93
78	March 31	Chicago	3 - 3	Detroit	*	41-25-12	94

April

Game	Date	Visitor	Score	Home	OT	Record	Points
79	April 12	Detroit	2 - 1	Chicago		42-25-12	96
80	April 14	Detroit	7 - 4	Minnesota		43-25-12	98

Legend: Win (2 points) Loss (0 points) Tie (1 point)

== Playoffs ==
Detroit finished the regular season in first place in the Norris Division for the third time in their history, qualifying for the playoffs. The Wings won the Division Semifinals (4–3) against the Minnesota North Stars but lost the Division Finals (0–4) to the Chicago Blackhawks.

== Player statistics ==
=== Forwards ===
Note: GP = Games played; G = Goals; A = Assists; Pts = Points; PIM = Penalty minutes

Player	GP	G	A	Pts	PIM
Steve Yzerman	79	45	58	103	64
Sergei Fedorov	80	32	54	86	72
Paul Ysebaert	79	35	40	75	55
Jimmy Carson	80	34	35	69	30
Ray Sheppard	74	36	26	62	27
Shawn Burr	79	19	32	51	118
Kevin Miller	80	20	26	46	53
Bob Probert	63	20	24	44	276
Gerard Gallant	69	14	22	36	187
Keith Primeau	35	6	10	16	83

=== Defensemen ===
Note: GP = Games played; G = Goals; A = Assists; Pts = Points; PIM = Penalty minutes

Player	GP	G	A	Pts	PIM
Nicklas Lidstrom	80	11	49	60	22
Steve Chiasson	62	10	24	34	136
Vladimir Konstantinov	79	8	25	33	172
Brad McCrimmon	79	7	22	29	118
Yves Racine	61	2	22	24	94
Doug Crossman	26	0	8	8	14
Brad Marsh	55	3	4	7	53

=== Goaltending ===
Note: GP = Games played; W = Wins; L = Losses; T = Ties; SO = Shutouts; GAA = Goals against average

Player	GP	W	L	T	SO	GAA
Tim Cheveldae	72	38	23	9	2	3.20
Greg Millen	10	3	2	3	0	2.71

== Draft picks ==
Detroit's draft picks at the 1991 NHL entry draft held at the Buffalo Memorial Auditorium in Buffalo, New York.

Round	#	Player	Nationality	College/Junior/Club team
1	10	Martin Lapointe	Canada	Laval Titan (QMJHL)
2	32	Jamie Pushor	Canada	Lethbridge Hurricanes (WHL)
3	54	Chris Osgood	Canada	Medicine Hat Tigers (WHL)
4	76	Mike Knuble	Canada	Kalamazoo Wings (NAHL)
5	98	Dmitri Motkov	Soviet Union	CSKA Moscow (USSR)
7	142	Igor Malykhin	Soviet Union	CSKA Moscow (USSR)
9	186	Jim Bermingham	Canada	Laval Titan (QMJHL)
10	208	Jason Firth	Canada	Kitchener Rangers (OHL)
11	230	Bart Tuner	United States	Michigan State University (CCHA)
12	252	Andrew Miller	Canada	Wexford Raiders (OJHL)
S	16	Kelly Sorensen	Canada	Ferris State University (CCHA)
