= 1991–92 Edmonton Oilers season =

NHL team season

1991–92 Edmonton Oilers
- Division: 3rd Smythe
- Conference: 6th Campbell
- 1991–92 record: 36–34–10
- Home record: 22–13–5
- Road record: 14–21–7
- Goals for: 295
- Goals against: 297

Team information
- General manager: Glen Sather
- Coach: Ted Green
- Captain: Kevin Lowe
- Alternate captains: Craig MacTavish; Esa Tikkanen
- Arena: Northlands Coliseum
- Average attendance: 16,179 (92.4%)
- Minor league affiliates: Cape Breton Oilers (AHL); Winston-Salem Thunderbirds (ECHL)

Team leaders
- Goals: Vincent Damphousse (38)
- Assists: Vincent Damphousse (51)
- Points: Vincent Damphousse (89)
- Penalty minutes: Dave Manson (220)
- Plus/minus: Norm Maciver (+20)
- Wins: Bill Ranford (27)
- Goals against average: Bill Ranford (3.58)

The 1991–92 Edmonton Oilers season was the Oilers' 13th season in the National Hockey League (NHL), and they were coming off a third-round playoff appearance in 1990–91, losing to the Minnesota North Stars in the Campbell Conference finals.

Prior to the season, the Oilers were involved in a couple of blockbuster deals, the first one occurring on September 19, as Edmonton traded Grant Fuhr, Glenn Anderson, and Craig Berube to the Toronto Maple Leafs in exchange for Vincent Damphousse, Peter Ing, Scott Thornton, and Luke Richardson. A little over two weeks later, the Oilers then dealt Mark Messier to the New York Rangers for Bernie Nicholls, Steven Rice, and Louie DeBrusk. Edmonton also named Ted Green as head coach as John Muckler left the Oilers for a job with the Buffalo Sabres.

Vincent Damphousse was the Oilers leader offensively, scoring a team high 38 goals and 51 assists for 89 points. Joe Murphy had a solid season, earning 82 points. Bernie Nicholls missed 31 games due to injury but recorded 49 points in the 49 games he played in. Defensively, Dave Manson anchored the blueline, leading all defensemen with 15 goals and 47 points and led the club in penalty minutes with 220. Fellow blueliner Norm MacIver earned 40 points in 59 games.

In goal, Bill Ranford appeared in 67 of the Oilers 80 games, winning 27 of them, and he posted a GAA of 3.58, and he earned a shutout along the way.

In the playoffs, the Oilers faced against Wayne Gretzky and the Los Angeles Kings, who finished two points ahead of Edmonton in the standings. The teams split the first four games, before Edmonton took control of the series, winning Game 5 in LA and taking the series with a solid 3–0 win in Game 6. The Oilers faced the regular season division champion Vancouver Canucks in the second round, and after splitting the opening two games in Vancouver, the Oilers won the next two games at home to take a 3–1 series lead. The Oilers lost Game 5 in Vancouver but won the series at home in the sixth game, setting up a matchup against the Chicago Blackhawks for the Campbell Conference championship. Chicago proved too much for the Oilers to handle, as Chicago swept the series, outscoring Edmonton 21–8.

This was the Oilers' eighth conference final appearance in 10 years, and their third in a row. However, the Oilers did not advance this far in the playoffs again until 2006.

== Season standings ==
Smythe Division
	GP	W	L	T	GF	GA	Pts
**Vancouver Canucks**	**80**	**42**	**26**	**12**	**285**	**250**	**96**
**Los Angeles Kings**	**80**	**35**	**31**	**14**	**287**	**250**	**84**
**Edmonton Oilers**	**80**	**36**	**34**	**10**	**295**	**297**	**82**
**Winnipeg Jets**	**80**	**33**	**32**	**15**	**251**	**244**	**81**
Calgary Flames	80	31	37	12	296	305	74
San Jose Sharks	80	17	58	5	219	359	39

Campbell Conference
R		Div	GP	W	L	T	GF	GA	Pts
1	**Detroit Red Wings**	**NRS**	**80**	**43**	**25**	**12**	**320**	**256**	**98**
2	**Vancouver Canucks**	**SMY**	**80**	**42**	**26**	**12**	**285**	**250**	**96**
3	**Chicago Blackhawks**	**NRS**	**80**	**36**	**29**	**15**	**257**	**236**	**87**
4	**Los Angeles Kings**	**SMY**	**80**	**35**	**31**	**14**	**287**	**296**	**84**
5	**St. Louis Blues**	**NRS**	**80**	**36**	**33**	**11**	**279**	**266**	**83**
6	**Edmonton Oilers**	**SMY**	**80**	**36**	**34**	**10**	**295**	**297**	**82**
7	**Winnipeg Jets**	**SMY**	**80**	**33**	**32**	**15**	**251**	**244**	**81**
8	Calgary Flames	SMY	80	31	37	12	296	305	74
9	**Minnesota North Stars**	**NRS**	**80**	**32**	**42**	**6**	**246**	**278**	**70**
10	Toronto Maple Leafs	NRS	80	30	43	7	234	294	67
11	San Jose Sharks	SMY	80	17	58	5	219	359	39

Divisions: NRS – Norris, SMY – Smythe
bold – Qualified for playoffs

== Schedule and results ==
1991–92 regular season
October

Game	Date	Visitor	Score	Home	Record	Pts
1	October 4	Edmonton Oilers	2–9	Calgary Flames	0–1–0	0
2	October 6	Los Angeles Kings	2–2	Edmonton Oilers	0–1–1	1
3	October 8	Edmonton Oilers	3–6	Los Angeles Kings	0–2–1	1
4	October 10	Edmonton Oilers	2–3	St. Louis Blues	0–3–1	1
5	October 12	Calgary Flames	1–3	Edmonton Oilers	1–3–1	3
6	October 15	Edmonton Oilers	1–3	Detroit Red Wings	1–4–1	3
7	October 17	Edmonton Oilers	2–4	Chicago Blackhawks	1–5–1	3
8	October 19	Edmonton Oilers	4–2	New York Islanders	2–5–1	5
9	October 20	Edmonton Oilers	4–3	New York Rangers	3–5–1	7
10	October 23	Washington Capitals	6–5	Edmonton Oilers	3–6–1	7
11	October 26	Vancouver Canucks	4–5	Edmonton Oilers	4–6–1	9
12	October 27	Edmonton Oilers	6–3	Vancouver Canucks	5–6–1	11
13	October 30	St. Louis Blues	2–2	Edmonton Oilers	5–6–2	12

November

Game	Date	Visitor	Score	Home	Record	Pts
14	November 1	New Jersey Devils	3–1	Edmonton Oilers	5–7–2	12
15	November 3	Edmonton Oilers	2–7	Vancouver Canucks	5–8–2	12
16	November 6	New York Islanders	3–5	Edmonton Oilers	6–8–2	14
17	November 8	Edmonton Oilers	2–6	San Jose Sharks	6–9–2	14
18	November 9	Edmonton Oilers	4–4	Los Angeles Kings	6–9–3	15
19	November 13	Edmonton Oilers	4–5	Pittsburgh Penguins	6–10–3	15
20	November 14	Edmonton Oilers	1–3	Philadelphia Flyers	6–11–3	15
21	November 16	Edmonton Oilers	6–2	Quebec Nordiques	7–11–3	17
22	November 18	Edmonton Oilers	0–1	Montreal Canadiens	7–12–3	17
23	November 23	Winnipeg Jets	4–0	Edmonton Oilers	7–13–3	17
24	November 27	Chicago Blackhawks	2–6	Edmonton Oilers	8–13–3	19
25	November 29	San Jose Sharks	4–4	Edmonton Oilers	8–13–4	20

December

Game	Date	Visitor	Score	Home	Record	Pts
26	December 1	Vancouver Canucks	0–7	Edmonton Oilers	9–13–4	22
27	December 3	Pittsburgh Penguins	3–5	Edmonton Oilers	10–13–4	24
28	December 6	Edmonton Oilers	4–4	Winnipeg Jets	10–13–5	25
29	December 8	San Jose Sharks	1–3	Edmonton Oilers	11–13–5	27
30	December 10	Edmonton Oilers	7–4	Vancouver Canucks	12–13–5	29
31	December 12	Edmonton Oilers	3–6	San Jose Sharks	12–14–5	29
32	December 14	Winnipeg Jets	5–7	Edmonton Oilers	13–14–5	31
33	December 15	Detroit Red Wings	4–1	Edmonton Oilers	13–15–5	31
34	December 18	Edmonton Oilers	7–5	Toronto Maple Leafs	14–15–5	33
35	December 20	Edmonton Oilers	4–4	Buffalo Sabres	14–15–6	34
36	December 21	Edmonton Oilers	3–6	Boston Bruins	14–16–6	34
37	December 23	Calgary Flames	3–5	Edmonton Oilers	15–16–6	36
38	December 28	Los Angeles Kings	9–4	Edmonton Oilers	15–17–6	36
39	December 29	Montreal Canadiens	3–1	Edmonton Oilers	15–18–6	36

January

Game	Date	Visitor	Score	Home	Record	Pts
40	January 2	Edmonton Oilers	3–5	Los Angeles Kings	15–19–6	36
41	January 4	Edmonton Oilers	3–2	Calgary Flames	16–19–6	38
42	January 5	Calgary Flames	3–2	Edmonton Oilers	16–20–6	38
43	January 8	Edmonton Oilers	2–5	Winnipeg Jets	16–21–6	38
44	January 10	Edmonton Oilers	2–8	Buffalo Sabres	16–22–6	38
45	January 11	Edmonton Oilers	5–5	Detroit Red Wings	16–22–7	39
46	January 13	Edmonton Oilers	7–4	Minnesota North Stars	17–22–7	41
47	January 15	Vancouver Canucks	5–3	Edmonton Oilers	17–23–7	41
48	January 21	San Jose Sharks	2–9	Edmonton Oilers	18–23–7	43
49	January 23	New York Rangers	3–1	Edmonton Oilers	18–24–7	43
50	January 25	Edmonton Oilers	2–5	San Jose Sharks	18–25–7	43
51	January 28	Edmonton Oilers	5–3	Vancouver Canucks	19–25–7	45
52	January 29	Chicago Blackhawks	4–3	Edmonton Oilers	19–26–7	45
53	January 31	Hartford Whalers	1–4	Edmonton Oilers	20–26–7	47

February

Game	Date	Visitor	Score	Home	Record	Pts
54	February 2	Quebec Nordiques	2–8	Edmonton Oilers	21–26–7	49
55	February 5	Montreal Canadiens	1–2	Edmonton Oilers	22–26–7	51
56	February 7	New York Islanders	2–4	Edmonton Oilers	23–26–7	53
57	February 11	Edmonton Oilers	5–4	Minnesota North Stars	24–26–7	55
58	February 13	Edmonton Oilers	3–1	Hartford Whalers	25–26–7	57
59	February 15	Edmonton Oilers	5–8	Philadelphia Flyers	25–27–7	57
60	February 16	Edmonton Oilers	5–7	Toronto Maple Leafs	25–28–7	57
61	February 19	Los Angeles Kings	3–4	Edmonton Oilers	26–28–7	59
62	February 21	Boston Bruins	5–3	Edmonton Oilers	26–29–7	59
63	February 23	Buffalo Sabres	2–5	Edmonton Oilers	27–29–7	61
64	February 26	Winnipeg Jets	1–6	Edmonton Oilers	28–29–7	63
65	February 28	Philadelphia Flyers	2–4	Edmonton Oilers	29–29–7	65

March

Game	Date	Visitor	Score	Home	Record	Pts
66	March 1	Edmonton Oilers	4–2	Winnipeg Jets	30–29–7	67
67	March 4	Toronto Maple Leafs	5–2	Edmonton Oilers	30–30–7	67
68	March 6	St. Louis Blues	3–5	Edmonton Oilers	31–30–7	69
69	March 11	New Jersey Devils	2–2	Edmonton Oilers	31–30–8	70
70	March 14	Hartford Whalers	1–3	Edmonton Oilers	32–30–8	72
71	March 17	Edmonton Oilers	5–6	Pittsburgh Penguins	32–31–8	72
72	March 19	Edmonton Oilers	5–3	New Jersey Devils	33–31–8	74
73	March 21	Edmonton Oilers	4–3	Boston Bruins	34–31–8	76
74	March 22	Edmonton Oilers	2–6	Washington Capitals	34–32–8	76
75	March 24	Edmonton Oilers	4–4	Calgary Flames	34–32–9	77
76	March 27	Minnesota North Stars	3–5	Edmonton Oilers	35–32–9	79
77	March 29	Los Angeles Kings	2–2	Edmonton Oilers	35–32–10	80
78	March 31	Edmonton Oilers	2–5	Calgary Flames	35–33–10	80

April

Game	Date	Visitor	Score	Home	Record	Pts
79	April 12	San Jose Sharks	4–6	Edmonton Oilers	36–33–10	82
80	April 14	Winnipeg Jets	6–2	Edmonton Oilers	36–34–10	82

Legend: Win (2 points) Loss (0 points) Tie (1 point)

== Playoffs ==
1992 Stanley Cup playoffs
Smythe Division Semifinals vs. (S2) Los Angeles Kings – Oilers win 4–2

Game	Date	Visitor	Score	Home	Series
1	April 18	Edmonton Oilers	3–1	Los Angeles Kings	1–0
2	April 20	Edmonton Oilers	5–8	Los Angeles Kings	1–1
3	April 22	Los Angeles Kings	3–4	Edmonton Oilers	2–1
4	April 24	Los Angeles Kings	4–3	Edmonton Oilers	2–2
5	April 26	Edmonton Oilers	5–2	Los Angeles Kings	3–2
6	April 28	Los Angeles Kings	0–3	Edmonton Oilers	4–2

Smythe Division Finals vs. (S1) Vancouver Canucks – Oilers win 4–2

Game	Date	Visitor	Score	Home	Series
1	May 3	Edmonton Oilers	4–3	Vancouver Canucks	1–0
2	May 4	Edmonton Oilers	0–4	Vancouver Canucks	1–1
3	May 6	Vancouver Canucks	2–5	Edmonton Oilers	2–1
4	May 8	Vancouver Canucks	2–3	Edmonton Oilers	3–1
5	May 10	Edmonton Oilers	3–4	Vancouver Canucks	3–2
6	May 12	Vancouver Canucks	0–3	Edmonton Oilers	4–2

Campbell Conference Finals vs. (N2) Chicago Blackhawks – Blackhawks win 4–0

Game	Date	Visitor	Score	Home	Series
1	May 16	Edmonton Oilers	2–8	Chicago Blackhawks	0–1
2	May 18	Edmonton Oilers	2–4	Chicago Blackhawks	0–2
3	May 20	Chicago Blackhawks	4–3	Edmonton Oilers	0–3
4	May 22	Chicago Blackhawks	5–1	Edmonton Oilers	0–4

Legend: Win Loss

== Season stats ==
=== Scoring leaders ===
Player	GP	G	A	Pts	PIM
Vincent Damphousse	80	38	51	89	53
Joe Murphy	80	35	47	82	52
Craig Simpson	79	24	37	61	80
Scott Mellanby	80	23	27	50	197
Bernie Nicholls	49	20	29	49	60

=== Goaltending ===
Player	GP	TOI	W	L	T	GA	SO	Save %	GAA
Norm Foster	10	439	5	3	0	20	0	.891	2.73
Bill Ranford	67	3822	27	26	10	228	1	.884	3.58
Peter Ing	12	463	3	4	0	33	0	.869	4.28
Ron Tugnutt	3	124	1	1	0	10	0	.863	4.84

== Playoff stats ==
=== Scoring leaders ===
Player	GP	G	A	Pts	PIM
Joe Murphy	16	8	16	24	12
Bernie Nicholls	16	8	11	19	25
Vincent Damphousse	16	6	8	14	8
Dave Manson	16	3	9	12	44
Esa Tikkanen	16	5	3	8	8

=== Goaltending ===
Player	GP	TOI	W	L	GA	SO	Save %	GAA
Ron Tugnutt	2	60	0	0	3	0	.912	3.00
Bill Ranford	16	909	8	8	51	2	.895	3.37

== Awards and records ==
=== Records ===
- 1,081: A new Oilers record for most penalty minutes in a career by defenceman by Kevin Lowe on October 8, 1991.

== Transactions ==
=== Trades ===
May 30, 1991	To Philadelphia Flyers Jari Kurri; Dave Brown; Corey Foster	To Edmonton Oilers Scott Mellanby; Craig Berube; Craig Fisher
June 12, 1991	To Winnipeg Jets John LeBlanc; 10th round pick in 1992	To Edmonton Oilers 5th round pick in 1991
September 11, 1991	To Boston Bruins 6th round pick in 1992	To Edmonton Oilers Norm Foster
September 19, 1991	To Toronto Maple Leafs Glenn Anderson; Grant Fuhr; Craig Berube	To Edmonton Oilers Vincent Damphousse; Luke Richardson; Peter Ing; Scott Thornton; Future considerations Cash
October 2, 1991	To Chicago Blackhawks Steve Smith	To Edmonton Oilers Dave Manson; 3rd round pick in 1992
October 4, 1991	To New York Rangers Mark Messier	To Edmonton Oilers Bernie Nicholls; Steven Rice; Louie DeBrusk
October 7, 1991	To Toronto Maple Leafs Ken Linseman	To Edmonton Oilers Cash
November 12, 1991	To New York Rangers Jeff Beukeboom	To Edmonton Oilers David Shaw
January 12, 1992	To New Jersey Devils Troy Mallette	To Edmonton Oilers David Maley
January 21, 1992	To Minnesota North Stars David Shaw	To Edmonton Oilers Brian Glynn
February 22, 1992	To Detroit Red Wings Max Middendorf	To Edmonton Oilers Bill McDougall
March 10, 1992	To Quebec Nordiques Martin Rucinsky	To Edmonton Oilers Ron Tugnutt; Brad Zavisha

=== Free agents ===
Player	Former team
F Dean Antos	Northern Michigan Wildcats (NCAA)

Player	New team
F Brad Aitken	Toronto Maple Leafs
F Adam Graves	New York Rangers

== Draft picks ==
Edmonton's draft picks at the 1991 NHL entry draft, the Oilers had two picks in the first round as part of the Wayne Gretzky trade.

Round	#	Player	Nationality	College/Junior/Club team (League)
1	12	Tyler Wright	Canada	Swift Current Broncos (WHL)
1	20	Martin Rucinsky	Czechoslovakia	Chemopetrol Litvínov (Czechoslovakia)
2	34	Andrew Verner	Canada	Peterborough Petes (OHL)
3	56	George Breen	United States	Cushing Academy (USHS-MA)
4	78	Mario Nobili	Canada	Verdun Collège Français (QMJHL)
5	93	Ryan Haggerty	United States	Westminster High School (USHS-CT)
7	144	David Oliver	Canada	University of Michigan (NCAA)
8	166	Gary Kitching	Canada	Thunder Bay Flyers (USHL)
10	210	Vegar Barlie	Norway	Vålerenga (Norway)
11	232	Evgeny Belosheikin	Soviet Union	CSKA Moscow (Russia)
12	254	Juha Riihijärvi	Finland	Oulun Kärpät (Finland)
S	18	Tom Holdeman	United States	Miami University (CCHA)
