= 1991–92 Hartford Whalers season =

National Hockey League team season

1991–92 Hartford Whalers
- Division: 4th Adams
- Conference: 10th Wales
- 1991–92 record: 26–41–13
- Home record: 13–17–10
- Road record: 13–24–3
- Goals for: 247
- Goals against: 283

Team information
- General manager: Eddie Johnston
- Coach: Jim Roberts
- Captain: Randy Ladouceur
- Alternate captains: John Cullen; Pat Verbeek
- Arena: Hartford Civic Center
- Average attendance: 10,896 (69.7%)
- Minor league affiliates: Springfield Indians (AHL); Louisville IceHawks (ECHL)

Team leaders
- Goals: John Cullen (26)
- Assists: John Cullen (51)
- Points: John Cullen (77)
- Penalty minutes: Pat Verbeek (243)
- Plus/minus: Mikael Andersson (+18)
- Wins: Kay Whitmore (14)
- Goals against average: Peter Sidorkiewicz (3.34)

The 1991–92 Hartford Whalers season saw the Whalers finish in fourth place in the Adams Division with a record of 26 wins, 41 losses, and 13 ties for 65 points. They lost the Adams Division semi-finals in seven games to the Montreal Canadiens, with Russ Courtnall scoring in double overtime of Game 7 at the Montreal Forum to end Hartford's season. This was the last time that the Whalers made the playoffs before moving to Raleigh.

== Off-season ==
On May 29, the Whalers announced that head coach Rick Ley was relieved of his duties as head coach of the team. In two seasons, Ley led Hartford to a 69–71–20 record, earning two playoff berths.

On the following day, May 30, the Whalers lost Dave Babych to the Minnesota North Stars at the 1991 NHL Dispersal and Expansion Drafts. Babych appeared in only eight games with Hartford during the 1990-91 season, earning six assists. In 349 career games with the Whalers, Babych scored 44 goals and earned 240 points since joining the team in the 1985-86 season.

The Whalers announced the hiring of Jimmy Roberts as the new head coach of the club on June 7. Roberts was the head coach of the Springfield Indians from 1988 to 1991, leading the club to two Calder Cup championships in 1989-90 and 1990-91. Roberts had previous NHL head coaching experience with the Buffalo Sabres during the 1982-83 season, as he led the club to a 21–16–8 record in 45 games. As a player, Roberts played in 1006 career games with the Montreal Canadiens and St. Louis Blues in a career that spanned from 1963 to 1978. Roberts won five Stanley Cups as a player.

On June 21, the Whalers selected goaltender Shaun Gravistin from the University of Alaska Anchorage in the 1991 NHL supplemental draft.

The next day, the Whalers participated at the 1991 NHL entry draft held at the Buffalo Memorial Auditorium in Buffalo, New York. With the ninth overall selection in the first round, the club selected Patrick Poulin from the Saint-Hyacinthe Laser of the Quebec Major Junior Hockey League. In 56 games during the 1990-91 season, Poulin scored 32 goals and 70 points. In the third round, with the 59th overall selection, the Whalers selected Michael Nylander from Huddinge IK. In 33 games, Nylander scored 14 goals and 34 points. The only other player from the draft that would eventually play in the NHL was Jim Storm, who the Whalers selected in the fourth round.

On August 26, the Whalers acquired Paul Fenton from the Calgary Flames in exchange for future considerations. The future considerations would be a sixth round draft pick in the 1992 NHL entry draft. Fenton scored 10 goals and 27 points in 61 games as he split the 1990-91 with the Toronto Maple Leafs and Calgary Flames.

The Whalers signed free agent Mario Gosselin on September 4. Gosselin played with the Phoenix Roadrunners of the IHL, posting a 24–15–4 record with a 3.86 GAA during the 1990-91 season. In 218 career NHL games, Gosselin earned a record of 86-94-13 with a 3.69 GAA while playing with the Quebec Nordiques and Los Angeles Kings from 1983 to 1990.

The very next day, on September 5, the club announced the signing of Barry Pederson. Pederson spent the 1990-91 season with the Pittsburgh Penguins, scoring six goals and 14 points in 46 games. In 1982-83, Pederson scored a career high 46 goals while with the Boston Bruins. The next season with the Bruins in 1983-84, Pederson scored a career high 116 points. In 1986, the Bruins traded him to the Vancouver Canucks in exchange for Cam Neely and the Canucks first round selection at the 1987 NHL entry draft, in which Boston selected Glen Wesley.

On September 8, the Whalers traded Sylvain Cote to the Washington Capitals for future considerations. In 382 career games with Hartford, Cote scored 31 goals and 92 points since he broke into the NHL during the 1983-84 season. To complete the trade, the Capitals sent their second round draft pick in the 1992 NHL entry draft.

The Whalers remained busy in September, as on September 17, the club acquired Andrew Cassels from the Montreal Canadiens in exchange for the Whalers second round selection in the 1992 NHL entry draft. Cassels, the Canadiens first round draft pick with the 17th overall selection in the 1987 NHL entry draft, scored six goals and 25 points in 51 games with Montreal during the 1990-91 season.

On October 2, the Whalers acquired Dan Keczmer from the San Jose Sharks in exchange for recently signed free agent Paul Fenton. Keczmer appeared in nine games with the Minnesota North Stars during the 1990-91, earning an assist. In 60 games with the Kalamazoo Wings of the IHL, Keczmer scored four goals and 24 points.

The next day, on October 3, the Whalers traded Todd Krygier to the Washington Capitals in exchange for a fourth round draft pick in the 1993 NHL entry draft. Krygier scored 13 goals and 30 points in 72 games with the Whalers in the 1990-91 season. On the same day, Hartford acquired Lee Norwood from the New Jersey Devils in exchange for the Whalers fifth round draft pick in the 1993 NHL entry draft. Norwood split the 1990-91 season between the Detroit Red Wings and the Devils, as in 49 games, he scored six goals and 15 points.

=== NHL draft ===
Hartford's draft picks at the 1991 NHL entry draft held at the Buffalo Memorial Auditorium in Buffalo, New York.

Round	#	Player	Nationality	College/Junior/Club team (League)
1	9	Patrick Poulin	Canada	Saint-Hyacinthe Laser (QMJHL)
2	31	Martin Hamrlik	Czechoslovakia	AC ZPS Zlín (Czechoslovakia)
3	53	Todd Hall	United States	Hamden High School (USHS-CT)
3	59	Michael Nylander	Sweden	Huddinge IK (Sweden)
4	75	Jim Storm	United States	Michigan Technological University (WCHA)
6	119	Mike Harding	Canada	Northern Michigan University (WCHA)
7	141	Brian Mueller	United States	South Kent School (USHS-CT)
8	163	Steven Yule	Canada	Kamloops Blazers (WHL)
9	185	Chris Belanger	Canada	Western Michigan University (CCHA)
10	207	Jason Currie	Canada	Clarkson University (ECAC)
11	229	Mike Santonelli	United States	Matignon High School (USHS-MA)
12	251	Rob Peters	United States	Ohio State University (CCHA)
S	15	Shaun Gravistin	Canada	University of Alaska Anchorage (WCHA)

== Regular season ==
=== Final standings ===
Adams Division
	GP	W	L	T	GF	GA	Pts
Montreal Canadiens	80	41	28	11	267	207	93
Boston Bruins	80	36	32	12	270	275	84
Buffalo Sabres	80	31	37	12	289	299	74
Hartford Whalers	80	26	41	13	247	283	65
Quebec Nordiques	80	20	48	12	255	318	52

== Schedule and results ==
=== Regular season ===
1991–92 regular season
October: 5–3–2 (home: 3–1–2; road: 2–2–0)

Game	Date	Time (ET)	Opponent	Score	OT	Decision	Location	Attendance	Record	Points	Recap
1	October 5, 1991		@ Quebec	2–4			Quebec Coliseum		0–1–0	0	L1
2	October 8, 1991		Montreal	2–2	OT		Hartford Civic Center		0–1–1	1	T1
3	October 12, 1991		NY Rangers	5–2			Hartford Civic Center		1–1–1	3	W1
4	October 14, 1991		@ Montreal	4–3			Montreal Forum		2–1–1	5	W2
5	October 16, 1991		@ Winnipeg	3–2			Winnipeg Arena		3–1–1	7	W3
6	October 19, 1991		Buffalo	4–1			Hartford Civic Center		4–1–1	9	W4
7	October 23, 1991		San Jose	3–0			Hartford Civic Center		5–1–1	11	W5
8	October 26	7:35 p.m. EDT	Chicago	2–4		Whitmore	Hartford Civic Center	11,038	5–2–1	11	L1
9	October 27, 1991		@ Buffalo	1–5			Buffalo Memorial Auditorium		5–3–1	11	L2
10	October 30, 1991		Los Angeles	4–4	OT		Hartford Civic Center		5–3–2	12	T1

November: 6–7–1 (home: 2–3–1; road: 4–4–0)

Game	Date	Time (ET)	Opponent	Score	OT	Decision	Location	Attendance	Record	Points	Recap
11	November 1, 1991		@ Detroit	5–8			Hartford Civic Center		5–4–2	12	L1
12	November 2	7:35 p.m. EST	@ Pittsburgh	6–5		Sidorkiewicz	Pittsburgh Civic Arena	16,164	6–4–2	14	W1
13	November 6, 1991		Calgary	2–3			Hartford Civic Center		6–5–2	14	L1
14	November 9, 1991		@ St. Louis	4–3			St. Louis Arena		7–5–2	16	W1
15	November 10	8:35 p.m. EST	@ Chicago	0–3		Whitmore	Chicago Stadium	17,687	7–6–2	16	L1
16	November 12, 1991		Quebec	5–4			Hartford Civic Center		8–6–2	18	W1
17	November 14, 1991		Montreal	2–2	OT		Hartford Civic Center		8–6–3	19	T1
18	November 16	7:35 p.m. EST	Boston	4–5	OT	Whitmore	Hartford Civic Center	15,635	8–7–3	19	L1
19	November 17, 1991		@ Toronto	3–1			Maple Leaf Gardens		9–7–3	21	W1
20	November 22, 1991		@ New Jersey	2–8			Brendan Byrne Arena		9–8–3	21	L1
21	November 23, 1991		Washington	2–3			Hartford Civic Center		9–9–3	21	L2
22	November 25, 1991		@ Quebec	2–5			Quebec Coliseum		9–10–3	21	L3
23	November 27, 1991		@ Philadelphia	7–3			The Spectrum		10–10–3	23	W1
24	November 30, 1991		Montreal	3–2			Hartford Civic Center		11–10–3	25	W2

December: 3–8–1 (home: 2–4–1; road: 1–4–0)

Game	Date	Time (ET)	Opponent	Score	OT	Decision	Location	Attendance	Record	Points	Recap
25	December 1	7:05 p.m. EST	@ Boston	4–5		Whitmore	Boston Garden	13,871	11–11–3	25	L1
26	December 4, 1991		Toronto	0–3			Hartford Civic Center		11–12–3	25	L2
27	December 7, 1991		Buffalo	6–6	OT		Hartford Civic Center		11–12–4	26	T1
28	December 13, 1991		@ Buffalo	8–4			Buffalo Memorial Auditorium		12–12–4	28	W1
29	December 14, 1991		NY Rangers	2–6			Hartford Civic Center		12–13–4	28	L1
30	December 17, 1991		NY Islanders	2–4			Hartford Civic Center		12–14–4	28	L2
31	December 19, 1991		New Jersey	1–4			Hartford Civic Center		12–15–4	28	L3
32	December 21, 1991		@ Montreal	2–3	OT		Montreal Forum		12–16–4	28	L4
33	December 23, 1991		Buffalo	4–3			Hartford Civic Center		13–16–4	30	W1
34	December 26	7:35 p.m. EST	@ Boston	2–3		Whitmore	Boston Garden	14,448	13–17–4	30	L1
35	December 28, 1991		@ Quebec	1–4			Quebec Coliseum		13–18–4	30	L2
36	December 29, 1991		NY Islanders	6–4			Hartford Civic Center		14–18–4	32	W1

January: 1–7–3 (home: 1–2–3; road: 0–5–0)

Game	Time (ET)	Date	Opponent	Score	OT	Decision	Location	Attendance	Record	Points	Recap
37	January 2, 1992		Quebec	4–1			Hartford Civic Center		15–18–4	34	W2
38	January 4, 1992		Washington	2–2	OT		Hartford Civic Center		15–18–5	35	T1
39	January 9, 1992		@ NY Islanders	1–2			Nassau Coliseum		15–19–5	35	L1
40	January 11, 1992		@ Montreal	2–3			Montreal Forum		15–20–5	35	L2
41	January 15	7:35 p.m. EST	Boston	3–4		Sidorkiewicz	Hartford Civic Center	13,307	15–21–5	35	L3
42	January 16	7:35 p.m. EST	@ Boston	3–4	OT	Sidorkiewicz	Boston Garden	14,194	15–22–5	35	L4
43rd All-Star Game in Philadelphia, Pennsylvania
43	January 21, 1992		Winnipeg	3–3	OT		Hartford Civic Center		15–22–6	36	T1
44	January 25	1:35 p.m. EST	Boston	4–4	OT	Sidorkiewicz	Hartford Civic Center	15,635	15–22–7	37	T2
45	January 26, 1992		@ Montreal	1–3			Montreal Forum		15–23–7	37	L1
46	January 28, 1992		Minnesota	3–4			Hartford Civic Center		15–24–7	37	L2
47	January 31	9:35 p.m. EST	@ Edmonton	1–4		Sidorkiewicz	Northlands Coliseum	15,581	15–25–7	37	L3

February: 4–6–4 (home: 2–3–2; road: 2–3–2)

Game	Date	Time (ET)	Opponent	Score	OT	Decision	Location	Attendance	Record	Points	Recap
48	February 1, 1992		@ Vancouver	4–4	OT		Pacific Coliseum		15–25–8	38	T1
49	February 4, 1992		@ San Jose	5–6			Cow Palace		15–26–8	38	L1
50	February 6, 1992		@ Los Angeles	5–5	OT		Great Western Forum		15–26–9	39	T1
51	February 9, 1992		Minnesota	4–4	OT		Hartford Civic Center		15–26–10	40	T2
52	February 11, 1992		Buffalo	5–1			Hartford Civic Center		16–26–10	42	W1
53	February 13	7:35 p.m. EST	Edmonton	1–3		Whitmore	Hartford Civic Center	9,303	16–27–10	42	L1
54	February 15, 1992		@ New Jersey	1–4			Hartford Civic Center		16–28–10	44	W1
55	February 16, 1992		@ Buffalo	4–5			Buffalo Memorial Auditorium		16–29–10	44	L1
56	February 19, 1992		Montreal	2–2	OT		Hartford Civic Center		16–29–11	45	T1
57	February 22, 1992		Quebec	4–0			Hartford Civic Center		17–29–11	45	L1
58	February 23, 1992		Detroit	0–4			Hartford Civic Center		17–30–11	45	L2
59	February 25, 1992		St. Louis	2–5			Hartford Civic Center		17–31–11	45	L3
60	February 27	7:35 p.m. EST	@ Pittsburgh	8–4		Sidorkiewicz	Pittsburgh Civic Arena	16,164	18–31–11	47	W1
61	February 29, 1992		@ Minnesota	5–4			Met Center		19–31–11	49	W2

March: 6–9–2 (home: 3–4–1; road: 3–5–1)

Game	Date	Time (ET)	Opponent	Score	OT	Decision	Location	Attendance	Record	Points	Recap
62	March 1, 1992		@ NY Rangers	4–9			Madison Square Garden		19–32–11	49	L1
63	March 3	7:35 p.m. EST	Boston	4–0		Sidorkiewicz	Hartford Civic Center	12,686	20–32–11	51	W1
64	March 5, 1992		Quebec	4–10			Hartford Civic Center		20–33–11	51	L1
65	March 7, 1992		Vancouver	1–5			Hartford Civic Center		20–34–11	51	L2
66	March 9, 1992		@ Quebec	0–2			Quebec Coliseum		20–35–11	51	L3
67	March 11, 1992		Los Angeles	4–0			Hartford Civic Center		21–35–11	53	W1
68	March 13, 1992		@ Winnipeg	1–0			Winnipeg Arena		22–35–11	55	W2
69	March 14	8:05 p.m. EST	@ Edmonton	1–3		Sidorkiewicz	Northlands Coliseum	16,684	22–36–11	55	L1
70	March 16, 1992		@ Calgary	4–3			Olympic Saddledome		23–36–11	57	W1
71	March 18, 1992		@ Vancouver	2–3			Pacific Coliseum		23–37–11	57	L1
72	March 21, 1992		San Jose	4–5			Hartford Civic Center		23–38–11	57	L2
73	March 22	7:05 p.m. EST	Pittsburgh	2–2	OT	Sidorkiewicz	Hartford Civic Center	10,640	23–38–12	58	T1
74	March 24, 1992		@ Washington	8–2			Capital Centre		24–38–12	60	W1
75	March 26, 1992		@ St. Louis	2–7			Hartford Civic Center		24–39–12	60	L1
76	March 28	7:35 p.m. EST	Chicago	1–3		Sidorkiewicz	Hartford Civic Center	11,324	24–40–12	60	L2
77	March 29, 1992		@ Buffalo	2–2	OT		Buffalo Memorial Auditorium		24–40–13	61	T1

April: 2–1–0 (home: 1–0–0; road: 1–1–0)

Game	Date	Time (ET)	Opponent	Score	OT	Decision	Location	Attendance	Record	Points	Recap
78	April 12, 1992		Philadelphia	4–2			Hartford Civic Center		25–40–13	63	W1
79	April 13	7:35 p.m. EDT	@ Boston	3–6		Sidorkiewicz	Boston Garden	12,675	25–41–13	63	L1
80	April 15, 1992		@ Philadelphia	4–3	OT		The Spectrum		26–41–13	65	W1

Legend: Win (2 points) Loss (0 points) Tie (1 point)

=== Playoffs ===
1992 Stanley Cup playoffs
Adams Division Semifinals vs. (A1) Montreal Canadiens – Canadiens win 4–3

Game	Date	Visitor	Score	Home	OT	Decision	Attendance	Series	Recap
1	April 19, 1992	Hartford	0–2	Montreal		Pietrangelo	16,624	0–1	
2	April 21, 1992	Hartford	2–5	Montreal		Pietrangelo	16,627	0–2	
3	April 23, 1992	Montreal	2–5	Hartford		Pietrangelo	6,728	1–2	
4	April 25, 1992	Montreal	1–3	Hartford		Pietrangelo	10,071	2–2	
5	April 27, 1992	Hartford	4–7	Montreal		Pietrangelo	16,693	2–3	
6	April 29, 1992	Montreal	1–2	Hartford	OT	Pietrangelo	8,262	3–3	
7	May 1, 1992	Hartford	2–3	Montreal	2OT	Pietrangelo	17,718	3–4	

Legend: Win Loss

== Player statistics ==
=== Regular season ===
Scoring

Player	Pos	GP	G	A	Pts	PIM	+/-	PPG	SHG	GWG
John Cullen	C	77	26	51	77	141	-28	10	0	4
Pat Verbeek	RW	76	22	35	57	243	-16	10	0	3
Zarley Zalapski	D	79	20	37	57	120	-7	4	0	3
Murray Craven	LW	61	24	30	54	38	-4	8	4	1
Mikael Andersson	LW	74	18	29	47	14	18	1	3	1
Bobby Holik	C	76	21	24	45	44	4	1	0	2
Andrew Cassels	C	67	11	30	41	18	3	2	2	3
Rob Brown	RW	42	16	15	31	39	-14	13	0	2
Geoff Sanderson	LW	64	13	18	31	18	5	2	0	1
Brad Shaw	D	62	3	22	25	44	1	0	0	0
Adam Burt	D	66	9	15	24	93	-16	4	0	1
Marc Bergevin	D	75	7	17	24	64	-13	4	1	1
Mark Hunter	RW	63	10	13	23	159	-8	5	0	0
Yvon Corriveau	LW	38	12	8	20	36	5	3	0	0
Randy Cunneyworth	LW	39	7	10	17	71	-5	0	0	1
Steve Konroyd	D	33	2	10	12	32	-5	1	0	0
James Black	LW	30	4	6	10	10	-4	1	0	1
Randy Ladouceur	D	74	1	9	10	127	-1	0	0	0
Doug Houda	D	56	3	6	9	125	-2	1	0	1
Michel Picard	LW	25	3	5	8	6	-2	1	0	0
Jim McKenzie	LW	67	5	1	6	87	-6	0	0	0
Kevin Dineen	RW	16	4	2	6	23	-6	1	0	1
Mark Greig	RW	17	0	5	5	6	7	0	0	0
Barry Pederson	C	5	2	2	4	0	-2	1	0	0
Ed Kastelic	W	25	1	3	4	61	-4	0	0	0
John Stevens	D	21	0	4	4	19	-4	0	0	0
Paul Cyr	LW	17	0	3	3	19	-4	0	0	0
Joe Day	C	24	0	3	3	10	-2	0	0	0
Daniel Shank	RW	13	2	0	2	18	-4	0	0	0
Terry Yake	C	15	1	1	2	4	-2	0	0	0
Paul Gillis	C	12	0	2	2	48	0	0	0	0
Peter Sidorkiewicz	G	35	0	1	1	2	0	0	0	0
Kay Whitmore	G	45	0	1	1	16	0	0	0	0
Jergus Baca	D	1	0	0	0	0	-1	0	0	0
Dan Keczmer	D	1	0	0	0	0	-1	0	0	0
Lee Norwood	D	6	0	0	0	16	0	0	0	0
Frank Pietrangelo	G	5	0	0	0	0	0	0	0	0
Patrick Poulin	C	1	0	0	0	2	-1	0	0	0
Todd Richards	D	6	0	0	0	2	-2	0	0	0
Chris Tancill	C	10	0	0	0	2	-6	0	0	0
Mike Tomlak	C/LW	6	0	0	0	0	-2	0	0	0

Goaltending

Player	MIN	GP	W	L	T	GA	GAA	SO	SA	SV	SV%
Kay Whitmore	2567	45	14	21	6	155	3.62	3	1292	1137	.880
Peter Sidorkiewicz	1995	35	9	19	6	111	3.34	2	940	829	.882
Frank Pietrangelo	306	5	3	1	1	12	2.35	0	156	144	.923
Team:	4868	80	26	41	13	278	3.43	5	2388	2110	.884

=== Playoffs ===
Scoring

Player	Pos	GP	G	A	Pts	PIM	PPG	SHG	GWG
Murray Craven	LW	7	3	3	6	6	0	1	0
Andrew Cassels	C	7	2	4	6	6	1	0	0
Yvon Corriveau	LW	7	3	2	5	18	2	0	1
Zarley Zalapski	D	7	2	3	5	6	0	0	0
Randy Cunneyworth	LW	7	3	0	3	9	1	1	1
John Cullen	C	7	2	1	3	12	1	0	1
Patrick Poulin	C	7	2	1	3	0	1	0	0
Todd Richards	D	5	0	3	3	4	0	0	0
Mikael Andersson	LW	7	0	2	2	6	0	0	0
Doug Houda	D	6	0	2	2	13	0	0	0
Pat Verbeek	RW	7	0	2	2	12	0	0	0
Geoff Sanderson	LW	7	1	0	1	2	0	0	0
Paul Gillis	C	5	0	1	1	0	0	0	0
Bobby Holik	C	7	0	1	1	6	0	0	0
Steve Konroyd	D	7	0	1	1	2	0	0	0
Randy Ladouceur	D	7	0	1	1	11	0	0	0
Brad Shaw	D	3	0	1	1	4	0	0	0
Marc Bergevin	D	5	0	0	0	2	0	0	0
Adam Burt	D	2	0	0	0	0	0	0	0
Mark Hunter	RW	4	0	0	0	6	0	0	0
Frank Pietrangelo	G	7	0	0	0	0	0	0	0
Daniel Shank	RW	5	0	0	0	22	0	0	0
Kay Whitmore	G	1	0	0	0	0	0	0	0

Goaltending

Player	MIN	GP	W	L	GA	GAA	SO	SA	SV	SV%
Frank Pietrangelo	425	7	3	4	19	2.68	0	244	225	.922
Kay Whitmore	19	1	0	0	1	3.16	0	5	4	.800
Team:	444	7	3	4	20	2.70	0	249	229	.920

Note: GP = Games played; G = Goals; A = Assists; Pts = Points; +/- = Plus-minus PIM = Penalty minutes; PPG = Power-play goals; SHG = Short-handed goals; GWG = Game-winning goals;
MIN = Minutes played; W = Wins; L = Losses; T = Ties; GA = Goals against; GAA = Goals-against average; SO = Shutouts; SA=Shots against; SV=Shots saved; SV% = Save percentage;

== Playoffs ==
=== Canadiens 4, Whalers 3 ===
==== Adams Division Semi-finals ====
===== (1) Montreal Canadiens vs. (4) Hartford Whalers =====
April 19	Hartford Whalers	0 – 2	Montreal Canadiens	Montreal Forum	Recap
No scoring		First period	16:18 - pp - Dionne (1) - (Keane, Savard)
No scoring		Second period	No scoring
No scoring		Third period	15:55 - Dionne (2) - (Savard, Gilchrist)
Pietrangelo (0-1) (28 saves / 30 shots)		Goalie stats	Roy (1-0) (32 saves / 32 shots)

April 21	Hartford Whalers	2 – 5	Montreal Canadiens	Montreal Forum	Recap
Cullen (1) - pp - (Konroyd, Shaw) - 7:16		First period	2:46 - pp - Gilchrist (1) - (Savard, Desjardins)
Cunneyworth (1) - (Gillis) - 15:07		Second period	10:54 - Gilchrist (2) - (Savard, Muller); 12:31 - pp - Muller (1) - (Schneider, Savard); 15:42 - Carbonneau (1) - (Brisebois, Savard)
No scoring		Third period	19:45 - pp - en - Desjardins (1) - (Unassisted)
Pietrangelo (0-2) (23 saves / 27 shots)		Goalie stats	Roy (2-0) (15 saves / 17 shots)

April 23	Montreal Canadiens	2 – 5	Hartford Whalers	Hartford Civic Center	Recap
Brisebois (1) - pp - (Muller, Lebeau) - 17:52		First period	No scoring
No scoring		Second period	4:29 - Zalapski (1) - (Craven, Richards); 10:19 - sh - Craven (1) - (Cassels, Houda); 19:09 - Cullen (2) - (Verbeek)
Lebeau (1) - pp - (Dionne, Corson) - 19:23		Third period	2:38 - Craven (2) - (Cassels); 16:06 - pp - Poulin (1) - (Verbeek, Zalapski)
Roy (2-1) (18 saves / 23 shots)		Goalie stats	Pietrangelo (1-2) (32 saves / 34 shots)

April 25	Montreal Canadiens	1 – 3	Hartford Whalers	Hartford Civic Center	Recap
No scoring		First period	12:18 - pp - Corriveau (1) - (Craven, Cassels)
No scoring		Second period	7:26 - pp - Cunneyworth (2) - (Corriveau)
Muller (2) - (Savard, Gilchrist) - 7:28		Third period	19:41 - en - Craven (3) - (Corriveau, Richards)
Roy (2-2) (33 saves / 35 shots)		Goalie stats	Pietrangelo (2-2) (24 saves / 25 shots)

April 27	Hartford Whalers	4 – 7	Montreal Canadiens	Montreal Forum	Recap
Cunneyworth (3) - sh - (Andersson, Ladouceur) - 4:03; Corriveau (2) - pp - (Cullen, Zalapski) - 12:42		First period	19:47 - Turgeon (1) - (Carbonneau, Brisebois)
Cassels (1) - pp - (Craven, Richards) - 8:33		Second period	15:01 - sh - Muller (3) - (Savard, Desjardins); 15:37 - Skrudland (1) - (Corson, Brisebois); 17:41 - pp - Muller (4) - (Daigneault); 19:55 - Brisebois (2) - (Corson)
Poulin (2) - (Zalapski) - 3:00		Third period	1:24 - LeClair (1) - (Daigneault); 12:19 - Corson (1) - (LeClair)
Pietrangelo (2-3) (23 saves / 29 shots); Whitmore (4 saves / 5 shots)		Goalie stats	Roy (3-2) (19 saves / 23 shots)

April 29	Montreal Canadiens	1 – 2	OT	Hartford Whalers	Hartford Civic Center	Recap
No scoring		First period		No scoring
Savard (1) - (Schneider, Daigenault) - 4:39		Second period		1:48 - Zalapski (2) - (Andersson, Houda)
No scoring		Third period		No scoring
No scoring		First overtime period		0:24 - Corriveau (3) - (Cassels)
Roy (3-3) (24 saves / 26 shots)		Goalie stats		Pietrangelo (3-3) (42 saves / 43 shots)

May 1	Hartford Whalers	2 – 3	2OT	Montreal Canadiens	Montreal Forum	Recap
No scoring		First period		6:08 - pp - Schneider (1) - (Savard, Gilchrist); 11:07 - Dionne (3) - (Lebeau)
Cassels (2) - (Unassisted) - 8:13; Sanderson (1) - (Poulin, Holík) - 15:36		Second period		No scoring
No scoring		Third period		No scoring
No scoring		Second overtime period		5:26 - Courtnall (1) - (Corson, Dionne)
Pietrangelo (3-4) (53 saves / 56 shots)		Goalie stats		Roy (4-3) (39 saves / 41 shots)

Montreal wins series 4 – 3

== Transactions ==
The Whalers were involved in the following transactions during the 1991–92 season.

=== Trades ===
June 22, 1991	To Winnipeg Jets Ray Neufeld	To Hartford Whalers Dave Babych
June 22, 1991	To Minnesota North Stars 5th round pick in 1991 - Mike Kennedy	To Hartford Whalers Future Considerations - Jukka Suomalainen on Nov. 21/91
August 26, 1991	To Calgary Flames 6th round pick in 1992 - Joel Bouchard	To Hartford Whalers Paul Fenton
September 8, 1991	To Washington Capitals Sylvain Cote	To Hartford Whalers 2nd round pick in 1992 - Andrei Nikolishin
September 17, 1991	To Montreal Canadiens 2nd round pick in 1992 - Valeri Bure	To Hartford Whalers Andrew Cassels
October 2, 1991	To San Jose Sharks Dean Evason	To Hartford Whalers Dan Keczmer
October 3, 1991	To New Jersey Devils 5th round pick in 1993 - John Guirestante	To Hartford Whalers Lee Norwood
October 3, 1991	To Washington Capitals Todd Krygier	To Hartford Whalers 4th round pick in 1993 - Jason Smith
October 18, 1991	To San Jose Sharks Paul Fenton	To Hartford Whalers Mike McHugh
November 13, 1991	To St. Louis Blues Lee Norwood	To Hartford Whalers 5th round pick in 1993 - Nolan Pratt
November 13, 1991	To Philadelphia Flyers Kevin Dineen	To Hartford Whalers Murray Craven; 4th round pick in 1992 - Kevin Smyth
November 14, 1991	To Boston Bruins Barry Pederson	To Hartford Whalers Future Considerations
December 18, 1991	To Detroit Red Wings Chris Tancill	To Hartford Whalers Daniel Shank
January 24, 1992	To Chicago Blackhawks Rob Brown	To Hartford Whalers Steve Konroyd
January 27, 1992	To Chicago Blackhawks Paul Gillis	To Hartford Whalers Future Considerations
March 10, 1992	To Pittsburgh Penguins 3rd round pick in 1994 - Sven Butenschon; 7th round pick in 1994 - Serge Aubin	To Hartford Whalers Frank Pietrangelo

=== Free agents ===
Player	Former Team
Shawn Evans	Boston Bruins
Mario Gosselin	Los Angeles Kings
Barry Pederson	Pittsburgh Penguins

Player	New Team
Chris Lindberg	Calgary Flames
