= 1991–92 Minnesota North Stars season =

25th North Stars season held in Minnesota

1991–92 Minnesota North Stars
- Division: 4th Norris
- Conference: 9th Campbell
- 1991–92 record: 32–42–6
- Home record: 20–16–4
- Road record: 12–26–2
- Goals for: 246
- Goals against: 278

Team information
- General manager: Bob Clarke
- Coach: Bob Gainey
- Captain: Mark Tinordi
- Alternate captains: Neal Broten; Stew Gavin
- Arena: Met Center

Team leaders
- Goals: Ulf Dahlen (36)
- Assists: Brian Bellows (45)
- Points: Mike Modano (77)
- Penalty minutes: Shane Churla (278)
- Plus/minus: Bobby Smith (+24)
- Wins: Jon Casey (19)
- Goals against average: Darcy Wakaluk (3.28)

The 1991–92 Minnesota North Stars season was the North Stars' 25th, and penultimate season in the Twin Cities area. A major aspect of the season was that several players were lost to the San Jose Sharks expansion team. To replenish their roster, the North Stars were permitted to select players from the other twenty NHL teams along with the Sharks in an expansion draft.

Minnesota North Stars 25th Anniversary patch, featuring Mike Modano facing off against Bill Goldsworthy.

Despite a diminished roster, the defending Campbell Conference champions still managed to claim the final playoff spot in the Norris Division. The North Stars were eliminated in the first round by the Detroit Red Wings in seven games.

== Offseason ==
The North Stars officially adopted a new logo for the 1991–92 season, retiring their original N logo. The new logo, featuring the word STARS set across the top of a slanted 5-pointed star, with the A forming the outline of the top point, had been introduced as a secondary mark during the prior season. Along with the new logo came new uniforms, with black as the primary color, with green and metallic gold trim. The team experimented with a Crillee typeface for the players' names during the preseason, but determined the names to be illegible, and replaced them with single-color block letters by the start of the season.

Howard Baldwin and Morris Belzberg came into conflict with fellow owner Norman Green over operation of the North Stars during the prior season, leading to Baldwin selling his stake to Green in August, and Belzberg selling to Green in October. The departing owners would then purchase the Pittsburgh Penguins from Edward J. DeBartolo, Sr. in November.

=== NHL draft ===
Minnesota's draft picks at the 1991 NHL entry draft held at the Buffalo Memorial Auditorium in Buffalo, New York.

Round	#	Player	Nationality	College/Junior/Club team (League)
1	8	Richard Matvichuk	Canada	Saskatoon Blades (WHL)
4	74	Mike Torchia	Canada	Kitchener Rangers (OHL)
5	97	Mike Kennedy	Canada	University of British Columbia (CIS)
6	118	Mark Lawrence	Canada	Detroit Junior Red Wings (OHL)
7	137	Geoff Finch	Canada	Brown University (ECAC)
8	174	Michael Burkett	Canada	Michigan State University (CCHA)
9	184	Derek Herlofsky	United States	St. Paul Vulcans (USHL)
10	206	Tom Nemeth	Canada	Cornwall Royals (OHL)
11	228	Shayne Green	Canada	Kamloops Blazers (WHL)
12	250	Jukka Suomalainen	Finland	Grankulla IFK (Finland)
S	14	Dan O'Shea	United States	St. Cloud State University (WCHA)

=== Dispersal Draft results ===
The Sharks selected 24 players from the North Stars.

- The reason for the Dispersal Draft was attributed the fact that a compromise was implemented for the 1990–91 season. The previous owners of the North Stars, the Gund brothers were awarded an expansion team in the Bay Area, that would be called the San Jose Sharks. The Sharks would receive players via a dispersal draft with the North Stars. The 1991–92 Sharks featured 14 former North Stars members.

#	Player
1.	Shane Churla (RW)
2.	Brian Hayward (G)
3.	Neil Wilkinson (D)
4.	Rob Zettler (D)
5.	Ed Courtenay (RW)
6.	Kevin Evans (LW)
7.	Link Gaetz (D)
8.	Dan Keczmer (D)
9.	Dean Kolstad (D)
10.	Peter Lappin (RW)
11.	Pat MacLeod (D)
12.	Mike McHugh (LW)
13.	Jarmo Myllys (G)
14.	J. F. Quintin (LW)
15.	Scott Cashman (G)
16.	Murray Garbutt (C)
17.	Rob Gaudreau (RW)
18.	Arturs Irbe (G)
19.	Shaun Kane (D)
20.	Larry Olimb (D)
21.	Tom Pederson (D)
22.	Bryan Schoen (G)
23.	John Weisbrod (C)
24.	Doug Zmolek (D)

=== Expansion Draft results ===
- After the Expansion Draft, the North Stars traded Kelly Kisio to the Sharks in order to reacquire Shane Churla.

#	Player	Drafted from	Drafted by
2.	Rob Ramage (D)	Toronto Maple Leafs	Minnesota North Stars
4.	Dave Babych (D)	Hartford Whalers	Minnesota North Stars
6.	Allen Pedersen (D)	Boston Bruins	Minnesota North Stars
8.	Charlie Huddy (D)	Edmonton Oilers	Minnesota North Stars
10.	Kelly Kisio (F)	New York Rangers	Minnesota North Stars
12.	Randy Gilhen (C)	Pittsburgh Penguins	Minnesota North Stars
14.	Rob Murray (C)	Washington Capitals	Minnesota North Stars
16.	Tyler Larter (F)	Winnipeg Jets	Minnesota North Stars
18.	Jim Thomson (RW)	Los Angeles Kings	Minnesota North Stars
20.	Guy Lafleur (RW)	Quebec Nordiques	Minnesota North Stars

== Regular season ==
The North Stars allowed the most short-handed goals during the regular season, with 22. This tied an NHL record set by the 1984–85 Pittsburgh Penguins.

=== Final standings ===
Norris Division
	GP	W	L	T	GF	GA	Pts
**Detroit Red Wings**	**80**	**43**	**25**	**12**	**320**	**256**	**98**
**Chicago Blackhawks**	**80**	**36**	**29**	**15**	**257**	**236**	**87**
**St. Louis Blues**	**80**	**36**	**33**	**11**	**279**	**266**	**83**
**Minnesota North Stars**	**80**	**32**	**42**	**6**	**246**	**278**	**70**
Toronto Maple Leafs	80	30	43	7	234	294	67

Campbell Conference
R		Div	GP	W	L	T	GF	GA	Pts
1	**Detroit Red Wings**	**NRS**	**80**	**43**	**25**	**12**	**320**	**256**	**98**
2	**Vancouver Canucks**	**SMY**	**80**	**42**	**26**	**12**	**285**	**250**	**96**
3	**Chicago Blackhawks**	**NRS**	**80**	**36**	**29**	**15**	**257**	**236**	**87**
4	**Los Angeles Kings**	**SMY**	**80**	**35**	**31**	**14**	**287**	**296**	**84**
5	**St. Louis Blues**	**NRS**	**80**	**36**	**33**	**11**	**279**	**266**	**83**
6	**Edmonton Oilers**	**SMY**	**80**	**36**	**34**	**10**	**295**	**297**	**82**
7	**Winnipeg Jets**	**SMY**	**80**	**33**	**32**	**15**	**251**	**244**	**81**
8	Calgary Flames	SMY	80	31	37	12	296	305	74
9	**Minnesota North Stars**	**NRS**	**80**	**32**	**42**	**6**	**246**	**278**	**70**
10	Toronto Maple Leafs	NRS	80	30	43	7	234	294	67
11	San Jose Sharks	SMY	80	17	58	5	219	359	39

Divisions: NRS – Norris, SMY – Smythe
bold – Qualified for playoffs

== Schedule and results ==
1991–92 regular season
October

Game	Result	Date	Score	Opponent	Record
1	W	October 5, 1991	4–2	Chicago Blackhawks (1991–92)	1–0–0
2	W	October 10, 1991	3–2	Quebec Nordiques (1991–92)	2–0–0
3	W	October 12, 1991	3–2	Detroit Red Wings (1991–92)	3–0–0
4	L	October 15, 1991	3–6	@ Calgary Flames (1991–92)	3–1–0
5	W	October 17, 1991	8–2	@ San Jose Sharks (1991–92)	4–1–0
6	L	October 19, 1991	2–5	@ Los Angeles Kings (1991–92)	4–2–0
7	L	October 22, 1991	2–4	Calgary Flames (1991–92)	4–3–0
8	L	October 24, 1991	2–5	Philadelphia Flyers (1991–92)	4–4–0
9	W	October 26, 1991	4–0	Boston Bruins (1991–92)	5–4–0
10	L	October 29, 1991	2–3	@ New York Rangers (1991–92)	5–5–0
11	L	October 31, 1991	1–8	@ Pittsburgh Penguins (1991–92)	5–6–0

November

Game	Result	Date	Score	Opponent	Record
12	W	November 2, 1991	4–3	Chicago Blackhawks (1991–92)	6–6–0
13	T	November 3, 1991	4–4 OT	@ Chicago Blackhawks (1991–92)	6–6–1
14	W	November 5, 1991	3–2	@ Detroit Red Wings (1991–92)	7–6–1
15	L	November 6, 1991	3–4	@ Toronto Maple Leafs (1991–92)	7–7–1
16	L	November 9, 1991	2–3	Pittsburgh Penguins (1991–92)	7–8–1
17	W	November 12, 1991	7–0	Toronto Maple Leafs (1991–92)	8–8–1
18	L	November 16, 1991	3–5	@ St. Louis Blues (1991–92)	8–9–1
19	L	November 19, 1991	4–7	New York Islanders (1991–92)	8–10–1
20	L	November 22, 1991	3–4	@ Detroit Red Wings (1991–92)	8–11–1
21	T	November 23, 1991	2–2 OT	Detroit Red Wings (1991–92)	8–11–2
22	L	November 29, 1991	2–3	Toronto Maple Leafs (1991–92)	8–12–2
23	W	November 30, 1991	4–3	@ Toronto Maple Leafs (1991–92)	9–12–2

December

Game	Result	Date	Score	Opponent	Record
24	T	December 3, 1991	3–3 OT	St. Louis Blues (1991–92)	9–12–3
25	W	December 4, 1991	5–2	St. Louis Blues (1991–92)	10–12–3
26	L	December 7, 1991	2–4	Washington Capitals (1991–92)	10–13–3
27	L	December 8, 1991	2–7	@ Chicago Blackhawks (1991–92)	10–14–3
28	W	December 10, 1991	4–3	New Jersey Devils (1991–92)	11–14–3
29	L	December 12, 1991	5–7	@ Vancouver Canucks (1991–92)	11–15–3
30	W	December 14, 1991	3–2	@ San Jose Sharks (1991–92)	12–15–3
31	W	December 17, 1991	2–1	@ Los Angeles Kings (1991–92)	13–15–3
32	L	December 21, 1991	0–3	Philadelphia Flyers (1991–92)	13–16–3
33	W	December 26, 1991	3–2	@ Winnipeg Jets (1991–92)	14–16–3
34	W	December 28, 1991	5–2	St. Louis Blues (1991–92)	15–16–3
35	W	December 31, 1991	6–2	Chicago Blackhawks (1991–92)	16–16–3

January

Game	Result	Date	Score	Opponent	Record
36	L	January 2, 1992	1–6	@ St. Louis Blues (1991–92)	16–17–3
37	W	January 4, 1992	4–3	Vancouver Canucks (1991–92)	17–17–3
38	L	January 5, 1992	2–5	@ Chicago Blackhawks (1991–92)	17–18–3
39	W	January 7, 1992	5–3	@ Washington Capitals (1991–92)	18–18–3
40	L	January 9, 1992	4–9	@ Detroit Red Wings (1991–92)	18–19–3
41	W	January 11, 1992	7–4	San Jose Sharks (1991–92)	19–19–3
42	L	January 13, 1992	4–7	Edmonton Oilers (1991–92)	19–20–3
43	W	January 15, 1992	5–2	Montreal Canadiens (1991–92)	20–20–3
44	T	January 22, 1992	3–3 OT	Los Angeles Kings (1991–92)	20–20–4
45	L	January 25, 1992	0–2	Chicago Blackhawks (1991–92)	20–21–4
46	L	January 27, 1992	2–3	@ Boston Bruins (1991–92)	20–22–4
47	W	January 28, 1992	4–3	@ Hartford Whalers (1991–92)	21–22–4
48	L	January 30, 1992	3–5	@ Philadelphia Flyers (1991–92)	21–23–4

February

Game	Result	Date	Score	Opponent	Record
49	L	February 1, 1992	1–2	New York Rangers (1991–92)	21–24–4
50	W	February 3, 1992	4–2	Toronto Maple Leafs (1991–92)	22–24–4
51	L	February 5, 1992	2–3 OT	@ Toronto Maple Leafs (1991–92)	22–25–4
52	W	February 7, 1992	2–0	@ Buffalo Sabres (1991–92)	23–25–4
53	T	February 9, 1992	4–4 OT	@ Hartford Whalers (1991–92)	23–25–5
54	L	February 11, 1992	4–5	Edmonton Oilers (1991–92)	23–26–5
55	W	February 13, 1992	6–1	Winnipeg Jets (1991–92)	24–26–5
56	W	February 15, 1992	5–2	Pittsburgh Penguins (1991–92)	25–26–5
57	L	February 17, 1992	0–8	@ Montreal Canadiens (1991–92)	25–27–5
58	L	February 18, 1992	0–4	@ Quebec Nordiques (1991–92)	25–28–5
59	L	February 21, 1992	4–5	@ New York Rangers (1991–92)	25–29–5
60	L	February 22, 1992	1–2	@ New York Islanders (1991–92)	25–30–5
61	W	February 24, 1992	3–1	@ New Jersey Devils (1991–92)	26–30–5
62	L	February 26, 1992	1–4	Montreal Canadiens (1991–92)	26–31–5
63	L	February 29, 1992	4–5 OT	Hartford Whalers (1991–92)	26–32–5

March

Game	Result	Date	Score	Opponent	Record
64	L	March 1, 1992	2–6	@ Toronto Maple Leafs (1991–92)	26–33–5
65	W	March 3, 1992	3–1	@ Washington Capitals (1991–92)	27–33–5
66	W	March 5, 1992	4–2	@ Detroit Red Wings (1991–92)	28–33–5
67	W	March 8, 1992	4–2	Winnipeg Jets (1991–92)	29–33–5
68	L	March 10, 1992	2–5	@ St. Louis Blues (1991–92)	29–34–5
69	L	March 11, 1992	0–3	Toronto Maple Leafs (1991–92)	29–35–5
70	W	March 14, 1992	4–1	Detroit Red Wings (1991–92)	30–35–5
71	W	March 17, 1992	3–1	Buffalo Sabres (1991–92)	31–35–5
72	L	March 19, 1992	1–4	@ Chicago Blackhawks (1991–92)	31–36–5
73	L	March 21, 1992	2–4	@ Quebec Nordiques (1991–92)	31–37–5
74	L	March 24, 1992	2–4	Vancouver Canucks (1991–92)	31–38–5
75	L	March 27, 1992	3–5	@ Edmonton Oilers (1991–92)	31–39–5
76	L	March 28, 1992	3–4	@ Calgary Flames (1991–92)	31–40–5
77	W	March 31, 1992	5–3	Buffalo Sabres (1991–92)	32–40–5

April

Game	Result	Date	Score	Opponent	Record
78	T	April 12, 1992	1–1 OT	St. Louis Blues (1991–92)	32–40–6
79	L	April 14, 1992	4–7	Detroit Red Wings (1991–92)	32–41–6
80	L	April 16, 1992	3–5	@ St. Louis Blues (1991–92)	32–42–6

Legend: Win (2 points) Loss (0 points) Tie (1 point)

== Playoffs ==
Detroit vs. Minnesota
Date	Away	Home	
April 18	Minnesota 4	3 Detroit	
April 20	Minnesota 4	2 Detroit	
April 22	Detroit 5	4 Minnesota	OT
April 24	Detroit 4	5 Minnesota	
April 26	Minnesota 0	3 Detroit	
April 28	Detroit 1	0 Minnesota	OT
April 30	Minnesota 2	5 Detroit	
Detroit wins series 4–3
