= 1991–92 Washington Capitals season =

NHL hockey team season

1991–92 Washington Capitals
- Division: 2nd Patrick
- Conference: 2nd Wales
- 1991–92 record: 45–27–8
- Home record: 25–12–3
- Road record: 20–15–5
- Goals for: 330
- Goals against: 275

Team information
- General manager: David Poile
- Coach: Terry Murray
- Captain: Rod Langway
- Alternate captains: Kevin Hatcher; Dale Hunter; Kelly Miller
- Arena: Capital Centre

Team leaders
- Goals: Dino Ciccarelli (38)
- Assists: Michal Pivonka (57)
- Points: Michal Pivonka (80)
- Penalty minutes: Alan May (221)
- Plus/minus: Dmitri Khristich (+24)
- Wins: Don Beaupre (29)
- Goals against average: Don Beaupre (3.20)

The 1991–92 Washington Capitals season was the Washington Capitals 18th season in the National Hockey League (NHL). They were not shut out in any of their regular-season games and playoff games.

== Regular season ==
The Capitals tied the Montreal Canadiens and the New York Rangers for fewest power-play goals allowed, with just 60.

=== Final standings ===
Patrick Division
	GP	W	L	T	GF	GA	Pts
**New York Rangers**	**80**	**50**	**25**	**5**	**321**	**246**	**105**
**Washington Capitals**	**80**	**45**	**27**	**8**	**330**	**257**	**98**
**Pittsburgh Penguins**	**80**	**39**	**32**	**9**	**343**	**308**	**87**
**New Jersey Devils**	**80**	**38**	**31**	**11**	**289**	**259**	**87**
New York Islanders	80	34	35	11	291	299	79
Philadelphia Flyers	80	32	37	11	252	273	75

Wales Conference
R		Div	GP	W	L	T	GF	GA	Pts
1	**p** – **New York Rangers**	**PAT**	**80**	**50**	**25**	**5**	**321**	**246**	**105**
2	**Washington Capitals**	**PAT**	**80**	**45**	**27**	**8**	**330**	**257**	**98**
3	**Montreal Canadiens**	**ADM**	**80**	**41**	**28**	**11**	**267**	**207**	**93**
4	**Pittsburgh Penguins**	**PAT**	**80**	**39**	**32**	**9**	**343**	**308**	**87**
5	**New Jersey Devils**	**PAT**	**80**	**38**	**31**	**11**	**289**	**259**	**87**
6	**Boston Bruins**	**ADM**	**80**	**36**	**32**	**12**	**270**	**275**	**84**
7	New York Islanders	PAT	80	34	35	11	291	299	79
8	Philadelphia Flyers	PAT	80	32	37	11	252	273	75
9	**Buffalo Sabres**	**ADM**	**80**	**31**	**37**	**12**	**289**	**299**	**74**
10	**Hartford Whalers**	**ADM**	**80**	**26**	**41**	**13**	**247**	**283**	**65**
11	Quebec Nordiques	ADM	80	20	48	12	255	318	52

Divisions: ADM – Adams, PAT – Patrick

p – Clinched Presidents' Trophy
bold – Qualified for playoffs

== Schedule and results ==
1991–92 regular season
October

Game	Result	Date	Score	Opponent	Record
1	W	October 4, 1991	5–2	Philadelphia Flyers (1991–92)	1–0–0
2	W	October 5, 1991	3–1	Buffalo Sabres (1991–92)	2–0–0
3	W	October 9, 1991	5–4	@ Toronto Maple Leafs (1991–92)	3–0–0
4	W	October 11, 1991	5–1	New York Rangers (1991–92)	4–0–0
5	L	October 12, 1991	2–7	Chicago Blackhawks (1991–92)	4–1–0
6	W	October 14, 1991	5–3	@ New York Rangers (1991–92)	5–1–0
7	W	October 18, 1991	6–5	New Jersey Devils (1991–92)	6–1–0
8	W	October 19, 1991	5–1	@ New Jersey Devils (1991–92)	7–1–0
9	W	October 23, 1991	6–5	@ Edmonton Oilers (1991–92)	8–1–0
10	L	October 24, 1991	1–3	@ Vancouver Canucks (1991–92)	8–2–0
11	L	October 27, 1991	5–6	@ Winnipeg Jets (1991–92)	8–3–0
12	W	October 29, 1991	8–0	@ Pittsburgh Penguins (1991–92)	9–3–0

November

Game	Result	Date	Score	Opponent	Record
13	W	November 1, 1991	4–0	Toronto Maple Leafs (1991–92)	10–3–0
14	W	November 2, 1991	7–4	@ New York Islanders (1991–92)	11–3–0
15	L	November 8, 1991	4–5	Detroit Red Wings (1991–92)	11–4–0
16	W	November 10, 1991	10–3	@ Quebec Nordiques (1991–92)	12–4–0
17	W	November 11, 1991	4–2	@ Montreal Canadiens (1991–92)	13–4–0
18	W	November 13, 1991	5–3	@ New York Rangers (1991–92)	14–4–0
19	W	November 15, 1991	6–2	Pittsburgh Penguins (1991–92)	15–4–0
20	L	November 20, 1991	5–6 OT	@ New Jersey Devils (1991–92)	15–5–0
21	W	November 22, 1991	6–3	Boston Bruins (1991–92)	16–5–0
22	W	November 23, 1991	3–2	@ Hartford Whalers (1991–92)	17–5–0
23	L	November 25, 1991	4–5	@ Detroit Red Wings (1991–92)	17–6–0
24	W	November 27, 1991	3–1	Montreal Canadiens (1991–92)	18–6–0
25	L	November 29, 1991	2–3	New York Islanders (1991–92)	18–7–0
26	L	November 30, 1991	1–8	@ New York Islanders (1991–92)	18–8–0

December

Game	Result	Date	Score	Opponent	Record
27	W	December 5, 1991	6–3	@ Philadelphia Flyers (1991–92)	19–8–0
28	W	December 7, 1991	4–2	@ Minnesota North Stars (1991–92)	20–8–0
29	L	December 8, 1991	3–4	@ Winnipeg Jets (1991–92)	20–9–0
30	W	December 10, 1991	4–1	Calgary Flames (1991–92)	21–9–0
31	L	December 13, 1991	3–5	New York Rangers (1991–92)	21–10–0
32	W	December 14, 1991	7–2	@ Pittsburgh Penguins (1991–92)	22–10–0
33	W	December 17, 1991	3–1	Quebec Nordiques (1991–92)	23–10–0
34	T	December 18, 1991	2–2 OT	@ Buffalo Sabres (1991–92)	23–10–1
35	W	December 20, 1991	4–3	Toronto Maple Leafs (1991–92)	24–10–1
36	L	December 22, 1991	3–4 OT	@ Philadelphia Flyers (1991–92)	24–11–1
37	L	December 26, 1991	6–8	New York Rangers (1991–92)	24–12–1
38	L	December 28, 1991	2–6	Pittsburgh Penguins (1991–92)	24–13–1
39	W	December 29, 1991	4–3	@ New Jersey Devils (1991–92)	25–13–1

January

Game	Result	Date	Score	Opponent	Record
40	W	January 1, 1992	8–5	New York Islanders (1991–92)	26–13–1
41	T	January 3, 1992	3–3 OT	Vancouver Canucks (1991–92)	26–13–2
42	T	January 4, 1992	2–2 OT	@ Hartford Whalers (1991–92)	26–13–3
43	L	January 7, 1992	3–5	Minnesota North Stars (1991–92)	26–14–3
44	W	January 10, 1992	7–4	Los Angeles Kings (1991–92)	27–14–3
45	L	January 12, 1992	2–4	@ Chicago Blackhawks (1991–92)	27–15–3
46	W	January 14, 1992	6–1	@ St. Louis Blues (1991–92)	28–15–3
47	T	January 16, 1992	2–2 OT	@ Los Angeles Kings (1991–92)	28–15–4
48	L	January 24, 1992	2–5	New Jersey Devils (1991–92)	28–16–4
49	W	January 26, 1992	6–4	Pittsburgh Penguins (1991–92)	29–16–4
50	L	January 28, 1992	2–3	@ Philadelphia Flyers (1991–92)	29–17–4

February

Game	Result	Date	Score	Opponent	Record
51	W	February 1, 1992	5–2	Calgary Flames (1991–92)	30–17–4
52	L	February 4, 1992	3–7	@ Buffalo Sabres (1991–92)	30–18–4
53	L	February 5, 1992	1–4	@ Detroit Red Wings (1991–92)	30–19–4
54	W	February 7, 1992	6–2	New York Rangers (1991–92)	31–19–4
55	W	February 9, 1992	6–2	San Jose Sharks (1991–92)	32–19–4
56	W	February 11, 1992	4–3	@ Quebec Nordiques (1991–92)	33–19–4
57	T	February 13, 1992	4–4 OT	@ Calgary Flames (1991–92)	33–19–5
58	L	February 15, 1992	3–6	@ Los Angeles Kings (1991–92)	33–20–5
59	W	February 18, 1992	4–2	@ San Jose Sharks (1991–92)	34–20–5
60	W	February 22, 1992	7–5	Philadelphia Flyers (1991–92)	35–20–5
61	W	February 23, 1992	4–1	@ New York Islanders (1991–92)	36–20–5
62	W	February 25, 1992	5–3	Pittsburgh Penguins (1991–92)	37–20–5
63	L	February 27, 1992	3–7	@ St. Louis Blues (1991–92)	37–21–5
64	T	February 29, 1992	5–5 OT	@ Boston Bruins (1991–92)	37–21–6

March

Game	Result	Date	Score	Opponent	Record
65	L	March 1, 1992	1–4	Boston Bruins (1991–92)	37–22–6
66	L	March 3, 1992	1–3	Minnesota North Stars (1991–92)	37–23–6
67	T	March 6, 1992	3–3 OT	Winnipeg Jets (1991–92)	37–23–7
68	W	March 7, 1992	3–2 OT	New Jersey Devils (1991–92)	38–23–7
69	W	March 9, 1992	5–2	@ New York Rangers (1991–92)	39–23–7
70	L	March 14, 1992	1–3	@ Philadelphia Flyers (1991–92)	39–24–7
71	W	March 15, 1992	5–2	New York Islanders (1991–92)	40–24–7
72	W	March 17, 1992	6–4	St. Louis Blues (1991–92)	41–24–7
73	L	March 20, 1992	6–7	Philadelphia Flyers (1991–92)	41–25–7
74	W	March 22, 1992	6–2	Edmonton Oilers (1991–92)	42–25–7
75	L	March 24, 1992	2–8	Hartford Whalers (1991–92)	42–26–7
76	W	March 27, 1992	4–3	Montreal Canadiens (1991–92)	43–26–7
77	W	March 29, 1992	7–4	Vancouver Canucks (1991–92)	44–26–7

April

Game	Result	Date	Score	Opponent	Record
78	W	April 12, 1992	4–3 OT	@ New Jersey Devils (1991–92)	45–26–7
79	T	April 13, 1992	1–1 OT	New York Islanders (1991–92)	45–26–8
80	L	April 15, 1992	1–4	@ Pittsburgh Penguins (1991–92)	45–27–8

Legend: Win (2 points) Loss (0 points) Tie (1 point)

== Playoffs ==
Lost Division Semifinals vs. Pittsburgh Penguins, 3–4

Series results: April 19–at Washington: Capitals, 3–1
April 21–at Washington: Capitals, 6–2
April 23–at Pittsburgh: Penguins, 6–4
April 25–at Pittsburgh: Capitals, 7–2
April 27–at Washington: Penguins, 5–2
April 29–at Pittsburgh: Penguins, 6–4
May 1–at Washington: Penguins, 3–1

== Player statistics ==
=== Regular season ===
Scoring

Player	Pos	GP	G	A	Pts	PIM	+/-	PPG	SHG	GWG
Michal Pivonka	C	80	23	57	80	47	10	7	4	2
Dale Hunter	C	80	28	50	78	205	-2	13	0	4
Dino Ciccarelli	RW	78	38	38	76	78	-10	13	0	7
Dmitri Khristich	LW/C	80	36	37	73	35	24	14	1	7
Mike Ridley	C	80	29	40	69	38	3	5	5	3
Randy Burridge	LW	66	23	44	67	50	-4	9	0	3
Peter Bondra	RW	71	28	28	56	42	16	4	0	3
Calle Johansson	D	80	14	42	56	49	2	5	2	2
Kevin Hatcher	D	79	17	37	54	105	18	8	1	2
Kelly Miller	LW	78	14	38	52	49	20	0	1	3
Al Iafrate	D	78	17	34	51	180	1	6	0	1
Sylvain Cote	D	78	11	29	40	31	7	6	0	2
John Druce	RW	67	19	18	37	39	14	1	0	3
Todd Krygier	LW	67	13	17	30	107	-1	1	0	1
Alan May	RW	75	6	9	15	221	-7	0	0	1
Rod Langway	D	64	0	13	13	22	11	0	0	0
Mike Lalor	D	64	5	7	12	64	14	0	0	1
Dave Tippett	LW	30	2	10	12	16	2	0	0	0
Nick Kypreos	LW	65	4	6	10	206	-3	0	0	0
Paul MacDermid	RW	15	2	5	7	43	2	0	0	0
Tim Bergland	RW	22	1	4	5	2	-3	0	0	0
Jeff Greenlaw	LW	5	0	1	1	34	-1	0	0	0
Mike Liut	G	21	0	1	1	2	0	0	0	0
Brad Schlegel	D	15	0	1	1	0	-4	0	0	0
Don Beaupre	G	54	0	0	0	30	0	0	0	0
Shawn Chambers	D	2	0	0	0	2	-3	0	0	0
Jim Hrivnak	G	12	0	0	0	0	0	0	0	0
Steve Konowalchuk	LW	1	0	0	0	0	0	0	0	0
Ken Sabourin	D	19	0	0	0	48	-5	0	0	0
Jason Woolley	D	1	0	0	0	0	1	0	0	0

Goaltending

Player	MIN	GP	W	L	T	GA	GAA	SO	SA	SV	SV%
Don Beaupre	3108	54	29	17	6	166	3.20	1	1435	1269	.884
Mike Liut	1123	21	10	7	2	70	3.74	1	558	488	.875
Jim Hrivnak	605	12	6	3	0	35	3.47	0	274	239	.872
Team:	4836	80	45	27	8	271	3.36	2	2267	1996	.880

=== Playoffs ===
Scoring

Player	Pos	GP	G	A	Pts	PIM	PPG	SHG	GWG
Mike Ridley	C	7	0	11	11	0	0	0	0
Dino Ciccarelli	RW	7	5	4	9	14	1	0	0
Peter Bondra	RW	7	6	2	8	4	1	0	0
Al Iafrate	D	7	4	2	6	14	1	0	0
Kevin Hatcher	D	7	2	4	6	19	0	1	0
Michal Pivonka	C	7	1	5	6	13	1	0	1
Dmitri Khristich	LW/C	7	3	2	5	15	3	0	1
Dale Hunter	C	7	1	4	5	16	0	0	0
Calle Johansson	D	7	0	5	5	4	0	0	0
Todd Krygier	LW	5	2	1	3	4	0	0	0
Sylvain Cote	D	7	1	2	3	4	0	0	0
Kelly Miller	LW	7	1	2	3	4	0	0	0
John Druce	RW	7	1	0	1	2	0	0	1
Randy Burridge	LW	2	0	1	1	0	0	0	0
Rod Langway	D	7	0	1	1	2	0	0	0
Paul MacDermid	RW	7	0	1	1	22	0	0	0
Brad Schlegel	D	7	0	1	1	2	0	0	0
Dave Tippett	LW	7	0	1	1	0	0	0	0
Don Beaupre	G	7	0	0	0	0	0	0	0
Alan May	RW	7	0	0	0	0	0	0	0

Goaltending

Player	MIN	GP	W	L	GA	GAA	SO	SA	SV	SV%
Don Beaupre	419	7	3	4	22	3.15	0	212	190	.896
Team:	419	7	3	4	22	3.15	0	212	190	.896

Note: GP = Games played; G = Goals; A = Assists; Pts = Points; +/- = Plus/minus; PIM = Penalty minutes; PPG=Power-play goals; SHG=Short-handed goals; GWG=Game-winning goals
MIN=Minutes played; W = Wins; L = Losses; T = Ties; GA = Goals against; GAA = Goals against average; SO = Shutouts; SA=Shots against; SV=Shots saved; SV% = Save percentage;

== Draft picks ==
Washington's draft picks at the 1991 NHL entry draft held at the Buffalo Memorial Auditorium in Buffalo, New York.

Round	#	Player	Nationality	College/Junior/Club team (League)
1	14	Pat Peake	United States	Detroit Compuware Ambassadors (OHL)
1	21	Trevor Halverson	Canada	North Bay Centennials (OHL)
2	25	Eric Lavigne	Canada	Hull Olympiques (QMJHL)
2	36	Jeff Nelson	Canada	Prince Albert Raiders (WHL)
3	58	Steve Konowalchuk	United States	Portland Winter Hawks (WHL)
4	80	Justin Morrison	Canada	Kingston Frontenacs (OHL)
7	146	Dave Morissette	Canada	Shawinigan Cataractes (QMJHL)
8	168	Rick Corriveau	Canada	London Knights (OHL)
9	190	Trevor Duhaime	Canada	Saint-Jean Lynx (QMJHL)
10	209	Rob Leask	Canada	Hamilton Red Wings (GHJHL)
10	212	Carl LeBlanc	Canada	Granby Bisons (QMJHL)
11	234	Rob Puchniak	Canada	Lethbridge Hurricanes (WHL)
12	256	Bill Kovacs	Canada	Sudbury Wolves (OHL)
S	20	Mike Brewer	Canada	Brown University (ECAC)

== See also ==
- 1991–92 NHL season
