= Kay Whitmore =

Canadian ice hockey player (born 1967)

- Born: April 10, 1967 (age 59) Sudbury, Ontario, Canada
- Height: 5 ft 11 in (180 cm)
- Weight: 175 lb (79 kg; 12 st 7 lb)
- Position: Goaltender
- Caught: Left
- Played for: Hartford Whalers; Vancouver Canucks; Boston Bruins; Calgary Flames
- NHL draft: 26th overall, 1985; Hartford Whalers
- Playing career: 1987–2002

Kay Whitmore, Jr. (born April 10, 1967) is a Canadian former ice hockey goaltender. He played for the Hartford Whalers, Vancouver Canucks, Boston Bruins, and Calgary Flames during his career, as well as several teams in the minor American Hockey League and International Hockey League, from 1987 until 2002.

== Hockey career ==
As a youth, Whitmore played in the 1979 Quebec International Pee-Wee Hockey Tournament with a minor ice hockey team from Greater Sudbury.

In 1983-84, Whitmore joined the OHL's Peterborough Petes and went 17-8-0 as a major junior rookie. The following season, he paced the league with 53 games by a goalie and 35 wins. In the playoffs, he went 10-4. In 1985-86, he went 27-12-2 with a league-best three shutouts and 2.77 GAA. At year's end, he was named an OHL First Team All-Star.

Whitmore was drafted 26th overall in the 1985 Entry Draft by the Hartford Whalers. He played most of his first four professional seasons for Hartford's minor league teams in Binghamton and Springfield, with some spot duty for the Whalers in 1989, 1990 and 1991. In the 1991 American Hockey League season, Whitmore led the Springfield Indians to the franchise's seventh and final Calder Cup, and was named the winner of the Jack A. Butterfield Trophy as playoff MVP.

The following season, Whitmore stuck in the NHL, platooning with Peter Sidorkiewicz in the Whalers' nets but losing his job to Frank Pietrangelo at season's end and in the playoffs.

In the 1992 offseason, he was traded to the Vancouver Canucks for Corrie D'Alessio and cash. That season, he played 31 games behind Kirk McLean and helped the Canucks win the Smythe Division season title, going 18-8-4 with a 3.10 GAA. In 1994, he played 32 games and posted an 18-14-0 record. In the playoffs, he helped his team win the Clarence Campbell Bowl in the Western Conference finals before losing to the New York Rangers in the Stanley Cup finals. In the shortened 1994-95 season, Kay played eleven games for the Canucks.

His contract expiring thereafter, Whitmore spent the next five seasons in the minor leagues, his most successful season being 1998, when he led the Long Beach Ice Dogs of the International Hockey League into the league semi-finals, as well as winning First Team All-Star accolades.

Being traded to the Boston Bruins in 1999 for future considerations, he was recalled from Boston's Providence farm team in the 2000-01 season when Bruins goaltenders Byron Dafoe and John Grahame were both injured. Whitmore, getting his first NHL start in over six years, posted a 5–4 win over the Chicago Blackhawks on November 2, 2000. In five games with the Bruins, Whitmore's save percentage stood at .809, and he was sent back down to the minors. The following season Whitmore signed as a free agent with the Calgary Flames, but only played in one game for them, seeing most of his action for their American Hockey League farm team, the Saint John Flames. He retired from professional hockey thereafter, save for a three-game playoff stint for the Nuremberg Ice Tigers of the Deutsche Eishockey Liga in 2005.

== Post-playing career ==
Following his hockey career, Whitmore was the goaltending coach for the Peterborough Petes from 2002-2004. From 2005-2006, Whitmore worked as a studio analyst on the NHL Network program On the Fly, as well as a guest studio analyst on The NHL on OLN Post Game Report. Whitmore was also a guest analyst on the Versus Network. Currently, Whitmore is serving as a goaltending supervisor for the NHL.

== Career statistics ==
=== Regular season and playoffs ===
			Regular season									Playoffs
Season	Team	League	GP	W	L	T/OT	MIN	GA	SO	GAA	SV%	GP	W	L	MIN	GA	SO	GAA	SV%
1982–83	Sudbury Legionnaires	NOHA	43	—	—	—	2580	108	4	2.51	—	—	—	—	—	—	—	—	—
1983–84	Peterborough Petes	OHL	29	17	8	0	1471	110	0	4.49	.858	—	—	—	—	—	—	—	—
1984–85	Peterborough Petes	OHL	53	35	16	2	3077	172	2	3.35	.901	17	10	4	1020	58	0	3.41	—
1985–86	Peterborough Petes	OHL	41	27	12	2	2467	114	3	2.77	.901	14	8	5	837	40	0	2.87	—
1986–87	Peterborough Petes	OHL	36	14	17	5	2159	118	1	3.28	—	7	3	3	366	17	1	2.79	—
1987–88	Binghamton Whalers	AHL	38	17	15	4	2137	121	3	3.40	.885	2	0	2	118	10	0	5.08	.873
1988–89	Hartford Whalers	NHL	3	2	1	0	180	10	0	3.33	.896	2	0	2	135	10	0	4.44	.863
1988–89	Binghamton Whalers	AHL	56	21	29	4	3200	241	1	4.52	.864	—	—	—	—	—	—	—	—
1989–90	Hartford Whalers	NHL	9	4	2	1	442	26	0	3.53	.858	—	—	—	—	—	—	—	—
1989–90	Binghamton Whalers	AHL	24	3	19	2	1386	109	0	4.72	.858	—	—	—	—	—	—	—	—
1990–91	Hartford Whalers	NHL	18	3	9	3	850	52	0	3.67	.863	—	—	—	—	—	—	—	—
1990–91	Springfield Indians	AHL	33	22	9	1	1916	98	1	3.07	.892	15	11	4	926	37	0	2.40	—
1991–92	Hartford Whalers	NHL	45	14	21	6	2567	155	3	3.62	.880	1	0	0	19	1	0	3.23	.800
1992–93	Vancouver Canucks	NHL	31	18	8	4	1817	94	1	3.10	.890	—	—	—	—	—	—	—	—
1993–94	Vancouver Canucks	NHL	32	18	14	0	1921	113	0	3.53	.867	—	—	—	—	—	—	—	—
1994–95	Vancouver Canucks	NHL	11	0	6	2	558	37	0	3.98	.867	1	0	0	20	2	0	6.00	.889
1995–96	Detroit Vipers	IHL	10	3	5	0	501	33	0	3.95	.860	—	—	—	—	—	—	—	—
1995–96	Los Angeles Ice Dogs	IHL	30	10	9	7	1563	99	1	3.80	.891	—	—	—	—	—	—	—	—
1995–96	Syracuse Crunch	AHL	11	6	4	1	663	37	0	3.35	.896	—	—	—	—	—	—	—	—
1995–96	Binghamton Rangers	AHL	—	—	—	—	—	—	—	—	—	2	0	2	127	9	0	4.27	.868
1996–97	Södertälje SK	SWE	25	—	—	—	1320	85	0	3.86	.858	—	—	—	—	—	—	—	—
1997–98	Long Beach Ice Dogs	IHL	46	28	12	3	2516	109	3	2.60	.898	14	9	5	838	43	0	3.08	—
1998–99	Hartford Wolf Pack	AHL	18	8	8	2	1080	47	0	2.61	.903	—	—	—	—	—	—	—	—
1998–99	Milwaukee Admirals	IHL	23	10	6	4	1304	64	2	2.95	.904	—	—	—	—	—	—	—	—
1999–00	Providence Bruins	AHL	43	17	19	3	2393	127	1	3.18	.899	1	0	1	59	2	0	2.04	.939
2000–01	Boston Bruins	NHL	5	1	2	0	203	18	0	5.33	.809	—	—	—	—	—	—	—	—
2000–01	Providence Bruins	AHL	26	13	8	2	1460	65	2	2.67	.917	—	—	—	—	—	—	—	—
2001–02	Calgary Flames	NHL	1	0	1	0	58	3	0	3.08	.857	—	—	—	—	—	—	—	—
2001–02	Saint John Flames	AHL	36	10	16	8	2001	83	0	2.49	.908	—	—	—	—	—	—	—	—
2004–05	Nürnberg Ice Tigers	DEL	—	—	—	—	—	—	—	—	—	3	—	—	—	—	—	—	—
NHL totals			155	60	64	16	8597	508	4	3.55	.875	4	0	2	174	13	0	4.49	.865
