= 1991–92 Buffalo Sabres season =

NHL hockey team season

1991–92 Buffalo Sabres
- Division: 3rd Adams
- Conference: 7th Wales
- 1991–92 record: 31–37–12
- Home record: 22–13–5
- Road record: 9–24–7
- Goals for: 289
- Goals against: 299

Team information
- General manager: Gerry Meehan
- Coach: John Muckler
- Captain: Mike Ramsey
- Alternate captains: Dave Andreychuk; Dale Hawerchuk
- Arena: Buffalo Memorial Auditorium

Team leaders
- Goals: Pat LaFontaine (46)
- Assists: Dale Hawerchuk (75)
- Points: Dale Hawerchuk (98)
- Penalty minutes: Rob Ray (354)
- Plus/minus: Pat LaFontaine (+10)
- Wins: Daren Puppa (11)
- Goals against average: Tom Draper (3.21)

The 1991–92 Buffalo Sabres season was the 22nd season for the National Hockey League (NHL) franchise that was established on May 22, 1970. The season saw the Sabres finish in third place in the Adams Division with a record of 31 wins, 37 losses, and 12 ties for 74 points. They lost the Adams Division Semi-final to the Boston Bruins in seven games.

== Offseason ==
=== NHL draft ===
Round	#	Player	Nationality	College/Junior/Club team
1	13	Philippe Boucher	Canada	Granby Bisons (QMJHL)
2	35	Jason Dawe	Canada	Peterborough Petes (OHL)
3	57	Jason Young	Canada	Sudbury Wolves (OHL)
4	72	Peter Ambroziak	Canada	Ottawa 67's (OHL)
5	101	Steve Shields	Canada	University of Michigan (CCHA)
6	123	Sean O'Donnell	Canada	Sudbury Wolves (OHL)
6	124	Brian Holzinger	United States	Detroit Compuware Ambassadors (SOJHL)
7	145	Chris Snell	Canada	Ottawa 67's (OHL)
8	162	Jiri Kuntos	Czechoslovakia	Dukla Jihlava (Czechoslovakia)
9	189	Tony Iob	Canada	Sault Ste. Marie Greyhounds (OHL)
10	211	Spencer Meany	Canada	St. Lawrence University (ECAC)
11	233	Mikhail Volkov	Soviet Union	Krylya Sovetov (WHL)
12	255	Michael Smith	Canada	Lake Superior State University (CCHA)
S	19	Jamie Steer	Canada	Michigan Technological University (WCHA)

== Regular season ==
Pat LaFontaine, frustrated with his situation on Long Island, turned down a four-year, $6 million contract offer and refused to report to the Islanders for the start of the 1991–92 NHL season. Three weeks into the season, on October 25, 1991, LaFontaine was traded, along with teammate Randy Wood, to the Buffalo Sabres for four players, including former first overall pick Pierre Turgeon.

The Sabres ended the regular season with the most power-play goals scored, with 105, and the best power-play percentage, with 22.53%.

=== Season standings ===
Adams Division
	GP	W	L	T	GF	GA	Pts
Montreal Canadiens	80	41	28	11	267	207	93
Boston Bruins	80	36	32	12	270	275	84
Buffalo Sabres	80	31	37	12	289	299	74
Hartford Whalers	80	26	41	13	247	283	65
Quebec Nordiques	80	20	48	12	255	318	52

== Schedule and results ==
1991–92 regular season
October

Game	Result	Date	Score	Opponent	Record
1	L	October 4, 1991	4–5	Pittsburgh Penguins (1991–92)	0–1–0
2	L	October 5, 1991	1–3	@ Washington Capitals (1991–92)	0-2-0
3	T	October 9, 1991	4–4	Boston Bruins (1991–92)	0-2–1
4	W	October 12, 1991	5–4	@ Quebec Nordiques (1991–92)	1–2–1
5	L	October 13, 1991	1–3	Vancouver Canucks (1991–92)	1–3–1
6	L	October 16, 1991	1–5	@ Montreal Canadiens (1991–92)	1–4–1
7	W	October 18, 1991	3–1	Montreal Canadiens (1991–92)	2–4–1
8	L	October 19, 1991	1–4	@ Hartford Whalers (1991–92)	2–5–1
9	W	October 25, 1991	3–1	San Jose Sharks (1991–92)	3–5–1
10	W	October 27, 1991	5–1	Hartford Whalers (1991–92)	4–5–1
11	L	October 30, 1991	1–3	@ Detroit Red Wings (1991–92)	4–6–1

November

Game	Result	Date	Score	Opponent	Record
12	L	November 1, 1991	1–5	Montreal Canadiens (1991–92)	4–7–1
13	L	November 2, 1991	0–5	@ Montreal Canadiens (1991–92)	4–8–1
14	L	November 7, 1991	2–5	@ Philadelphia Flyers (1991–92)	4–9–1
15	W	November 8, 1991	4–3 OT	Philadelphia Flyers (1991–92)	5–9–1
16	W	November 12, 1991	7–1	@ San Jose Sharks (1991–92)	6–9–1
17	T	November 14, 1991	2–2 OT	@ Los Angeles Kings (1991–92)	6–9–2
18	W	November 16, 1991	5–4	@ Calgary Flames (1991–92)	7–9–2
19	W	November 20, 1991	3–1	Boston Bruins (1991–92)	8–9–2
20	W	November 22, 1991	2–0	Chicago Blackhawks (1991–92)	9–9–2
21	L	November 23, 1991	4–7	@ Boston Bruins (1991–92)	9–10–2
22	T	November 27, 1991	4–4 OT	Quebec Nordiques (1991–92)	9–10–3
23	L	November 29, 1991	4–5 OT	New York Rangers (1991–92)	9–11–3
24	L	November 30, 1991	3–4	@ Quebec Nordiques (1991–92)	9–12–3

December

Game	Result	Date	Score	Opponent	Record
25	L	December 4, 1991	4–5	@ Winnipeg Jets (1991–92)	9–13–3
26	T	December 7, 1991	6–6 OT	@ Hartford Whalers (1991–92)	9–13–4
27	L	December 8, 1991	2–4	Calgary Flames (1991–92)	9–14–4
28	L	December 11, 1991	3–6	St. Louis Blues (1991–92)	9–15–4
29	L	December 13, 1991	4–8	Hartford Whalers (1991–92)	9–16–4
30	L	December 14, 1991	2–4	@ Montreal Canadiens (1991–92)	9–17–4
31	T	December 18, 1991	2–2 OT	Washington Capitals (1991–92)	9–17–5
32	T	December 20, 1991	4–4 OT	Edmonton Oilers (1991–92)	9–17–6
33	W	December 21, 1991	4–1	@ Toronto Maple Leafs (1991–92)	10–17–6
34	L	December 23, 1991	3–4	@ Hartford Whalers (1991–92)	10–18–6
35	W	December 27, 1991	8–1	Boston Bruins (1991–92)	11–18–6
36	L	December 28, 1991	0–3	@ New Jersey Devils (1991–92)	11–19–6
37	W	December 31, 1991	4–3	St. Louis Blues (1991–92)	12–19–6

January

Game	Result	Date	Score	Opponent	Record
38	W	January 3, 1992	5–2	New York Islanders (1991–92)	13–19–6
39	L	January 4, 1992	2–4	@ Boston Bruins (1991–92)	13–20–6
40	T	January 7, 1992	5–5 OT	@ Philadelphia Flyers (1991–92)	13–20–7
41	W	January 8, 1992	4–2	Quebec Nordiques (1991–92)	14–20–7
42	W	January 10, 1992	8–2	Edmonton Oilers (1991–92)	15–20–7
43	W	January 12, 1992	6–3	New York Rangers (1991–92)	16–20–7
44	L	January 14, 1992	2–6	@ New York Rangers (1991–92)	16–21–7
45	T	January 15, 1992	8–8 OT	@ New Jersey Devils (1991–92)	16–21–8
46	L	January 21, 1992	4–5	@ St. Louis Blues (1991–92)	16–22–8
47	W	January 23, 1992	5–4 OT	@ Pittsburgh Penguins (1991–92)	17–22–8
48	W	January 25, 1992	4–3	@ Montreal Canadiens (1991–92)	18–22–8
49	W	January 26, 1992	5–2	Winnipeg Jets (1991–92)	19–22–8
50	T	January 29, 1992	4–4 OT	@ Detroit Red Wings (1991–92)	19–22–9
51	W	January 31, 1992	5–3	Montreal Canadiens (1991–92)	20–22–9

February

Game	Result	Date	Score	Opponent	Record
52	T	February 1, 1992	2–2 OT	@ Boston Bruins (1991–92)	20–22–10
53	W	February 4, 1992	7–3	Washington Capitals (1991–92)	21–22–10
54	L	February 7, 1992	0–2	Minnesota North Stars (1991–92)	21–23–10
55	L	February 9, 1992	4–5	Los Angeles Kings (1991–92)	21–24–10
56	L	February 11, 1992	1–5	@ Hartford Whalers (1991–92)	21–25–10
57	L	February 12, 1992	4–9	Detroit Red Wings (1991–92)	21–26–10
58	W	February 14, 1992	7–6	San Jose Sharks (1991–92)	22–26–10
59	W	February 16, 1992	5–4	Hartford Whalers (1991–92)	23–26–10
60	L	February 19, 1992	5–6	@ Vancouver Canucks (1991–92)	23–27–10
61	L	February 23, 1992	2–5	@ Edmonton Oilers (1991–92)	23–28–10
62	W	February 25, 1992	5–3	@ Calgary Flames (1991–92)	24–28–10
63	L	February 29, 1992	2–5	@ Pittsburgh Penguins (1991–92)	24–29–10

March

Game	Result	Date	Score	Opponent	Record
64	L	March 1, 1992	1–3	Chicago Blackhawks (1991–92)	24–30–10
65	T	March 3, 1992	4–4 OT	@ Quebec Nordiques (1991–92)	24–30–11
66	W	March 6, 1992	5–4	New Jersey Devils (1991–92)	25–30–11
67	L	March 8, 1992	2–6	New York Islanders (1991–92)	25–31–11
68	W	March 11, 1992	6–3	Boston Bruins (1991–92)	26–31–11
69	L	March 14, 1992	1–4	@ New York Islanders (1991–92)	26–32–11
70	W	March 15, 1992	6–4	Quebec Nordiques (1991–92)	27–32–11
71	L	March 17, 1992	1–3	@ Minnesota North Stars (1991–92)	27–33–11
72	W	March 19, 1992	8–2	@ Los Angeles Kings (1991–92)	28–33–11
73	W	March 22, 1992	6–2	@ Chicago Blackhawks (1991–92)	29–33–11
74	W	March 25, 1992	5–2	Toronto Maple Leafs (1991–92)	30–33–11
75	L	March 28, 1992	3–4 OT	@ Boston Bruins (1991–92)	30–34–11
76	T	March 29, 1992	2–2 OT	Hartford Whalers (1991–92)	30–34–12
77	L	March 31, 1992	3–5	@ Minnesota North Stars (1991–92)	30–35–12

April

Game	Result	Date	Score	Opponent	Record
78	W	April 12, 1992	3–1	Montreal Canadiens (1991–92)	31–35–12
79	L	April 14, 1992	3–7	@ Quebec Nordiques (1991–92)	31–36–12
80	L	April 15, 1992	3–4	Quebec Nordiques (1991–92)	31–37–12

Legend: Win (2 points) Loss (0 points) Tie (1 point)

== Playoffs ==
1992 Stanley Cup playoffs

Boston vs. Buffalo
Date	Away	Home
April 19	Buffalo 3	2 Boston
April 21	Buffalo 2	3 Boston	OT
April 23	Boston 3	2 Buffalo
April 25	Boston 5	4 Buffalo	OT
April 27	Buffalo 2	0 Boston
April 29	Boston 3	9 Buffalo
May 1	Buffalo 2	3 Boston
Boston wins series 4–3

== Awards and records ==
Led by Rob Ray's 354 penalty minutes, the Buffalo Sabres set an NHL record for team penalty minutes in a season, with 2713.
