= 1991–92 Montreal Canadiens season =

NHL hockey team season

1991–92 Montreal Canadiens
- Adams Division champions
- Division: 1st Adams
- Conference: 2nd Wales
- 1991–92 record: 41–28–11
- Home record: 27–8–5
- Road record: 14–20–6
- Goals for: 267
- Goals against: 207

Team information
- General manager: Serge Savard
- Coach: Pat Burns
- Captain: Guy Carbonneau
- Alternate captains: Mike McPhee; Brian Skrudland
- Arena: Montreal Forum

Team leaders
- Goals: Kirk Muller (36)
- Assists: Denis Savard (42)
- Points: Kirk Muller (77)
- Penalty minutes: Lyle Odelein (212)
- Plus/minus: Brent Gilchrist (+29)
- Wins: Patrick Roy (36)
- Goals against average: Patrick Roy (2.36)

The 1991–92 Montreal Canadiens season was the team's 83rd season. The season saw the Canadiens won the Adams Division and make it to the second round of the playoffs, losing to the Boston Bruins in the Adams Division final. After the sweep, head coach Pat Burns resigned.

== Pre-season ==
The Canadiens changed their personnel in the off-season. Andrew Cassels, Tom Chorske, Stephane Richer and Ryan Walter were traded. The Canadiens picked up Kirk Muller and Roland Melanson.

== Regular season ==
The team started well, losing just three times in October. At New Year's, the team led the league overall standings with 54 points. In February, the Canadiens reacquired Chris Nilan three years after he left Montreal. In the last 17 games of his NHL career, the veteran enforcer adds 74 penalty minutes to raise his overall total with the Canadiens to 2,248 minutes, the most in team history. In March, the team traded Petr Svoboda to Buffalo in return for Kevin Haller.

March was dismal for the team, winning only four of 11 games. On April 1, the league's players went on a ten-day strike. The regular season resumed and the Canadiens continued to struggle, slipping to fifth-place overall, but finished first in the Adams Division. The team played well defensively, winning the William M. Jennings Trophy, Patrick Roy winning the Vezina Trophy and Guy Carbonneau winning the Frank J. Selke Trophy and finished +60 in goals.

The Canadiens finished first in the NHL in goaltending, allowing only 207 goals. Furthermore, they tied the Winnipeg Jets for most shutouts, with 7, and they tied the New York Rangers and Washington Capitals for fewest power-play goals allowed, with just 60. The Canadiens were the most disciplined team during the regular season, being short-handed only 320 times. Although the Canadiens scored the fewest short-handed goals during the regular season (4), they tied the Toronto Maple Leafs for the fewest short-handed goals allowed (5).

=== Final standings ===
Adams Division
	GP	W	L	T	GF	GA	Pts
**Montreal Canadiens**	**80**	**41**	**28**	**11**	**267**	**207**	**93**
**Boston Bruins**	**80**	**36**	**32**	**12**	**270**	**275**	**84**
**Buffalo Sabres**	**80**	**31**	**37**	**12**	**289**	**299**	**74**
**Hartford Whalers**	**80**	**26**	**41**	**13**	**247**	**283**	**65**
Quebec Nordiques	80	20	48	12	255	318	52

Wales Conference
R		Div	GP	W	L	T	GF	GA	Pts
1	**p** – **New York Rangers**	**PAT**	**80**	**50**	**25**	**5**	**321**	**246**	**105**
2	**Washington Capitals**	**PAT**	**80**	**45**	**27**	**8**	**330**	**257**	**98**
3	**Montreal Canadiens**	**ADM**	**80**	**41**	**28**	**11**	**267**	**207**	**93**
4	**Pittsburgh Penguins**	**PAT**	**80**	**39**	**32**	**9**	**343**	**308**	**87**
5	**New Jersey Devils**	**PAT**	**80**	**38**	**31**	**11**	**289**	**259**	**87**
6	**Boston Bruins**	**ADM**	**80**	**36**	**32**	**12**	**270**	**275**	**84**
7	New York Islanders	PAT	80	34	35	11	291	299	79
8	Philadelphia Flyers	PAT	80	32	37	11	252	273	75
9	**Buffalo Sabres**	**ADM**	**80**	**31**	**37**	**12**	**289**	**299**	**74**
10	**Hartford Whalers**	**ADM**	**80**	**26**	**41**	**13**	**247**	**283**	**65**
11	Quebec Nordiques	ADM	80	20	48	12	255	318	52

Divisions: ADM – Adams, PAT – Patrick

p – Clinched Presidents' Trophy
bold – Qualified for playoffs

== Schedule and results ==
1991–92 regular season
October

Game	Result	Date	Score	Opponent	Record
1	W	October 3, 1991	4–3	Toronto Maple Leafs	1–0–0
2	L	October 5, 1991	1–2 OT	New York Rangers	1–1–0
3	T	October 8, 1991	2–2 OT	@ Hartford Whalers	1–1–1
4	W	October 10, 1991	4–1	@ Detroit Red Wings	2–1–1
5	W	October 12, 1991	6–0	@ Boston Bruins	3–1–1
6	L	October 14, 1991	3–4	Hartford Whalers	3–2–1
7	W	October 16, 1991	5–1	Buffalo Sabres	4–2–1
8	L	October 18, 1991	1–3	@ Buffalo Sabres	4–3–1
9	W	October 19, 1991	1–0	@ Philadelphia Flyers	5–3–1
10	W	October 23, 1991	3–2 OT	Quebec Nordiques	6–3–1
11	W	October 24, 1991	5–0	@ Quebec Nordiques	7–3–1
12	W	October 26, 1991	4–1	Pittsburgh Penguins	8–3–1
13	W	October 30, 1991	6–1	Winnipeg Jets	9–3–1

November

Game	Result	Date	Score	Opponent	Record
14	W	November 1, 1991	5–1	@ Buffalo Sabres	10–3–1
15	W	November 2, 1991	5–0	Buffalo Sabres	11–3–1
16	W	November 4, 1991	3–2 OT	New Jersey Devils	12–3–1
17	W	November 6, 1991	4–1	@ New York Rangers	13–3–1
18	L	November 8, 1991	2–3	@ New Jersey Devils	13–4–1
19	W	November 9, 1991	4–2	Chicago Blackhawks	14–4–1
20	L	November 11, 1991	2–4	Washington Capitals	14–5–1
21	T	November 14, 1991	2–2 OT	@ Hartford Whalers	14–5–2
22	L	November 16, 1991	1–3	Philadelphia Flyers	14–6–2
23	W	November 18, 1991	1–0	Edmonton Oilers	15–6–2
24	L	November 21, 1991	2–5	@ Quebec Nordiques	15–7–2
25	W	November 23, 1991	5–3	Quebec Nordiques	16–7–2
26	W	November 25, 1991	4–3	Boston Bruins	17–7–2
27	L	November 27, 1991	1–3	@ Washington Capitals	17–8–2
28	L	November 29, 1991	4–5 OT	@ Boston Bruins	17–9–2
29	L	November 30, 1991	2–3	@ Hartford Whalers	17–10–2

December

Game	Result	Date	Score	Opponent	Record
30	L	December 4, 1991	0–3	Vancouver Canucks	17–11–2
31	W	December 5, 1991	5–4 OT	@ New York Islanders	18–11–2
32	W	December 7, 1991	5–1	Calgary Flames	19–11–2
33	W	December 9, 1991	4–1	@ Toronto Maple Leafs	20–11–2
34	L	December 12, 1991	2–5	@ Boston Bruins	20–12–2
35	W	December 14, 1991	4–2	Buffalo Sabres	21–12–2
36	W	December 16, 1991	4–2	St. Louis Blues	22–12–2
37	L	December 19, 1991	4–6	@ Chicago Blackhawks	22–13–2
38	W	December 21, 1991	3–2 OT	Hartford Whalers	23–13–2
39	W	December 22, 1991	3–2	Boston Bruins	24–13–2
40	W	December 26, 1991	4–1	@ Quebec Nordiques	25–13–2
41	W	December 29, 1991	3–1	@ Edmonton Oilers	26–13–2
42	L	December 31, 1991	2–3 OT	@ Calgary Flames	26–14–2

January

Game	Result	Date	Score	Opponent	Record
43	W	January 4, 1992	1–0 OT	@ San Jose Sharks	27–14–2
44	W	January 8, 1992	3–2	Boston Bruins	28–14–2
45	W	January 11, 1992	3–2	Hartford Whalers	29–14–2
46	T	January 13, 1992	2–2 OT	Calgary Flames	29–14–3
47	L	January 15, 1992	2–5	@ Minnesota North Stars	29–15–3
48	T	January 16, 1992	6–6 OT	@ St. Louis Blues	29–15–4
49	W	January 23, 1992	3–1	@ Boston Bruins	30–15–4
50	L	January 25, 1992	3–4	Buffalo Sabres	30–16–4
51	W	January 26, 1992	3–1	Hartford Whalers	31–16–4
52	L	January 29, 1992	3–4	New Jersey Devils	31–17–4
53	L	January 31, 1992	3–5	@ Buffalo Sabres	31–18–4

February

Game	Result	Date	Score	Opponent	Record
54	W	February 1, 1992	4–3 OT	Detroit Red Wings	32–18–4
55	L	February 4, 1992	3–5	@ Vancouver Canucks	32–19–4
56	L	February 5, 1992	1–2	@ Edmonton Oilers	32–20–4
57	L	February 8, 1992	4–6	@ Toronto Maple Leafs	32–21–4
58	W	February 10, 1992	8–3	Vancouver Canucks	33–21–4
59	W	February 12, 1992	6–1	San Jose Sharks	34–21–4
60	T	February 15, 1992	4–4 OT	Quebec Nordiques	34–21–5
61	W	February 17, 1992	8–0	Minnesota North Stars	35–21–5
62	T	February 19, 1992	2–2 OT	@ Hartford Whalers	35–21–6
63	W	February 22, 1992	2–1	Pittsburgh Penguins	36–21–6
64	T	February 23, 1992	3–3 OT	Quebec Nordiques	36–21–7
65	W	February 26, 1992	4–1	@ Minnesota North Stars	37–21–7
66	T	February 28, 1992	3–3 OT	@ San Jose Sharks	37–21–8
67	L	February 29, 1992	3–5	@ Los Angeles Kings	37–22–8

March

Game	Result	Date	Score	Opponent	Record
68	W	March 3, 1992	4–3	@ New York Islanders	38–22–8
69	W	March 7, 1992	8–2	New York Islanders	39–22–8
70	W	March 8, 1992	4–1	Detroit Red Wings	40–22–8
71	L	March 11, 1992	4–5	@ Quebec Nordiques	40–23–8
72	W	March 14, 1992	5–2	Los Angeles Kings	41–23–8
73	L	March 16, 1992	1–4	@ New York Rangers	41–24–8
74	L	March 18, 1992	3–4	Philadelphia Flyers	41–25–8
75	T	March 21, 1992	3–3 OT	St. Louis Blues	41–25–9
76	T	March 25, 1992	2–2 OT	@ Winnipeg Jets	41–25–10
77	L	March 27, 1992	3–4	@ Washington Capitals	41–26–10
78	L	March 28, 1992	3–6	@ Pittsburgh Penguins	41–27–10

April

Game	Result	Date	Score	Opponent	Record
79	L	April 12, 1992	1–3	@ Buffalo Sabres	41–28–10
80	T	April 15, 1992	4–4 OT	Boston Bruins	41–28–11

Legend: Win (2 points) Loss (0 points) Tie (1 point)

== Playoffs ==
The Canadiens placed first in the division, and played the fourth-place Whalers in the first round. The Canadiens won the series 4–3 to advance to the second round. In the second round, the Bruins defeated the Canadiens 4–0 to eliminate the Canadiens. Coach Pat Burns, who was increasingly criticized in the media, resigned after the season.

== Player statistics ==
=== Regular season ===
==== Scoring ====
Player	Pos	GP	G	A	Pts	PIM	+/-	PPG	SHG	GWG
Kirk Muller	LW	78	36	41	77	86	15	15	1	7
Denis Savard	C	77	28	42	70	73	6	12	1	5
Stephan Lebeau	C	77	27	31	58	14	18	13	0	5
Shayne Corson	LW	64	17	36	53	118	15	3	0	2
Brent Gilchrist	LW	79	23	27	50	57	29	2	0	3
Mike Keane	RW	67	11	30	41	64	16	2	0	2
Guy Carbonneau	C	72	18	21	39	39	2	1	1	4
Eric Desjardins	D	77	6	32	38	50	17	4	0	2
Gilbert Dionne	LW	39	21	13	34	10	7	7	0	2
Mathieu Schneider	D	78	8	24	32	72	10	2	0	1
Mike McPhee	LW	78	16	15	31	63	6	0	0	1
Russ Courtnall	RW	27	7	14	21	6	6	0	1	1
Petr Svoboda	D	58	5	16	21	94	9	1	0	3
Sylvain Turgeon	LW	56	9	11	20	39	-4	6	0	1
John LeClair	LW	59	8	11	19	14	5	3	0	0
J. J. Daigneault	D	79	4	14	18	36	16	2	0	0
Sylvain Lefebvre	D	69	3	14	17	91	9	0	0	0
Benoit Brunet	LW	18	4	6	10	14	4	0	0	0
Paul DiPietro	C	33	4	6	10	25	5	0	0	0
Patrice Brisebois	D	26	2	8	10	20	9	0	0	1
Lyle Odelein	D	71	1	7	8	212	15	0	0	0
Brian Skrudland	C	42	3	3	6	36	-4	0	0	1
Patrick Roy	G	67	0	5	5	4	0	0	0	0
Kevin Haller	D	8	2	2	4	17	4	1	0	0
Chris Nilan	RW	17	1	3	4	74	-1	0	0	0
Mario Roberge	LW	20	2	1	3	62	3	0	0	0
Todd Ewen	RW	46	1	2	3	130	3	0	0	0
Alain Cote	D	13	0	3	3	22	7	0	0	0
Jesse Belanger	C	4	0	0	0	0	-1	0	0	0
Donald Dufresne	D	3	0	0	0	2	2	0	0	0
Roland Melanson	G	9	0	0	0	0	0	0	0	0
Andre Racicot	G	9	0	0	0	0	0	0	0	0
Ed Ronan	RW	3	0	0	0	0	0	0	0	0
Vladimir Vujtek	LW	2	0	0	0	0	-1	0	0	0

==== Goaltending ====
Player	MIN	GP	W	L	T	GA	GAA	SO	SA	SV	SV%
Patrick Roy	3935	67	36	22	8	155	2.36	5	1806	1651	.914
Roland Melanson	492	9	5	3	0	22	2.68	2	195	173	.887
Andre Racicot	436	9	0	3	3	23	3.17	0	219	196	.895
Team:	4863	80	41	28	11	200	2.47	7	2220	2020	.910

=== Playoffs ===
==== Scoring ====
Player	Pos	GP	G	A	Pts	PIM	PPG	SHG	GWG
Denis Savard	C	11	3	9	12	8	1	0	0
Kirk Muller	LW	11	4	3	7	31	2	1	1
Gilbert Dionne	LW	11	3	4	7	10	1	0	1
Shayne Corson	LW	10	2	5	7	15	0	0	0
Eric Desjardins	D	11	3	3	6	4	1	0	0
Patrice Brisebois	D	11	2	4	6	6	1	0	1
Brent Gilchrist	LW	11	2	4	6	6	1	0	0
Mathieu Schneider	D	10	1	4	5	6	1	0	0
Stephan Lebeau	C	8	1	3	4	4	1	0	0
J. J. Daigneault	D	11	0	3	3	4	0	0	0
Guy Carbonneau	C	11	1	1	2	6	0	0	0
Russ Courtnall	RW	10	1	1	2	4	0	0	1
Mike Keane	RW	8	1	1	2	16	0	0	0
John LeClair	LW	8	1	1	2	4	0	0	0
Mike McPhee	LW	8	1	1	2	4	0	0	0
Brian Skrudland	C	11	1	1	2	20	0	0	0
Sean Hill	D	4	1	0	1	2	0	0	0
Sylvain Turgeon	LW	5	1	0	1	4	0	0	0
Chris Nilan	RW	7	0	1	1	15	0	0	0
Todd Ewen	RW	3	0	0	0	18	0	0	0
Kevin Haller	D	9	0	0	0	6	0	0	0
Sylvain Lefebvre	D	2	0	0	0	2	0	0	0
Lyle Odelein	D	7	0	0	0	11	0	0	0
Andre Racicot	G	1	0	0	0	0	0	0	0
Patrick Roy	G	11	0	0	0	2	0	0	0

==== Goaltending ====
Player	MIN	GP	W	L	GA	GAA	SO	SA	SV	SV%
Patrick Roy	686	11	4	7	30	2.62	1	312	282	.904
Andre Racicot	1	1	0	0	0	0.00	0	1	1	1.000
Team:	687	11	4	7	30	2.62	1	313	283	.904

Note:

Pos = Position;GP = Games played; G = Goals; A = Assists; Pts = Points; PIM = Penalty minutes; +/- = Plus/minus; PPG = Power-play goals; SHG = Short-handed goals; GWG = Game-winning goals
Pos = Position;GP = Games played; Min, TOI = Minutes played; W = Wins; L = Losses; T,T/OT = Ties; OTL = Overtime losses; GA = Goals-against; GAA = Goals-against average; SO = Shutouts; SA = Shots against; SV = Shots saved;SV% = Save percentage;

== Awards and records ==
- Patrick Roy, Vezina Trophy, William M. Jennings Trophy
- Guy Carbonneau, Frank J. Selke Trophy

== Draft picks ==
Round	#	Player	Position	Nationality	College/junior/club team (league)
1	17	Brent Bilodeau	D	United States	Seattle Thunderbirds (WHL)
2	28	Jim Campbell	RW	United States	N.Y. Northwood Prep (USHS-NY)
2	43	Craig Darby	C	United States	The Albany Academy (USHS-NY)
3	61	Yves Sarault	LW	Canada	Saint-Jean Lynx (QMJHL)
4	73	Vladimir Vujtek	LW	Czechoslovakia	Tri-City Americans (WHL)
4	81	Sylvain Lapointe	D	Canada	Clarkson University (ECAC)
5	100	Brad Layzell	D	Canada	Rensselaer Polytechnic Institute (ECAC)
5	105	Tony Prpic	F	United States	Culver Military Academy (USHS-IN)
6	127	Oleg Petrov	RW	Soviet Union	CSKA Moscow (Soviet Union)
7	149	Brady Kramer	C	United States	Haverford High School (USHS-PN)
8	171	Brian Savage	LW	Canada	Miami University (CCHA)
9	193	Scott Fraser	RW	Canada	Dartmouth College (ECAC)
10	215	Greg MacEachern	D	Canada	Laval Titan (QMJHL)
11	237	Paul Lepler	D	United States	Rochester Mustangs (USHL)
12	259	Dale Hooper	D	United States	Springfield Olympics (NEJHL)
S	23	Jeff Torrey	RW	United States	Clarkson University (ECAC)

== See also ==
- 1991–92 NHL season
- 1991 NHL entry draft
- 1992 Stanley Cup playoffs
- 1992 NHL All-Star Game
