= Yvon Corriveau =

Canadian ice hockey player (born 1967)

- Born: February 8, 1967 (age 59) Welland, Ontario, Canada
- Height: 6 ft 1 in (185 cm)
- Weight: 195 lb (88 kg; 13 st 13 lb)
- Position: Left wing
- Shot: Left
- Played for: Washington Capitals; Hartford Whalers; San Jose Sharks
- NHL draft: 19th overall, 1985; Washington Capitals
- Playing career: 1987–2005

Yvon Rene Corriveau (born February 8, 1967) is a Canadian former professional ice hockey left winger.

Corriveau was born in Welland, Ontario. Selected by the Washington Capitals in the 1985 NHL entry draft, Corriveau also played for the Hartford Whalers and San Jose Sharks. He retired from active professional play in 2005. Yvon is now the head coach of multiple teams in the Connecticut Chiefs Hockey Organization.

== Career statistics ==
			Regular season					Playoffs
Season	Team	League	GP	G	A	Pts	PIM	GP	G	A	Pts	PIM
1983–84	Welland Cougars	GHL	36	16	21	37	51	—	—	—	—	—
1984–85	Toronto Marlboros	OHL	59	23	28	51	65	3	0	0	0	5
1985–86	Washington Capitals	NHL	2	0	0	0	0	4	0	3	3	2
1985–86	Toronto Marlboros	OHL	59	54	36	90	75	4	1	1	2	0
1986–87	Washington Capitals	NHL	17	1	1	2	24	—	—	—	—	—
1986–87	Toronto Marlboros	OHL	23	14	19	33	23	—	—	—	—	—
1986–87	Binghamton Whalers	AHL	7	0	0	0	2	8	0	1	1	0
1987–88	Washington Capitals	NHL	44	10	9	19	84	13	1	2	3	30
1987–88	Binghamton Whalers	AHL	35	15	14	29	64	—	—	—	—	—
1988–89	Washington Capitals	NHL	33	3	2	5	62	1	0	0	0	0
1988–89	Baltimore Skipjacks	AHL	33	16	23	39	65	—	—	—	—	—
1989–90	Washington Capitals	NHL	50	9	6	15	50	—	—	—	—	—
1989–90	Hartford Whalers	NHL	13	4	1	5	22	4	1	0	1	0
1990–91	Hartford Whalers	NHL	23	1	1	2	18	—	—	—	—	—
1990–91	Springfield Indians	AHL	44	17	25	42	10	18	10	6	16	31
1991–92	Hartford Whalers	NHL	38	12	8	20	36	7	3	2	5	18
1991–92	Springfield Indians	AHL	39	26	15	41	40	—	—	—	—	—
1992–93	San Jose Sharks	NHL	20	3	7	10	0	—	—	—	—	—
1992–93	Hartford Whalers	NHL	37	5	5	10	14	—	—	—	—	—
1993–94	Hartford Whalers	NHL	3	0	0	0	0	—	—	—	—	—
1993–94	Springfield Indians	AHL	71	42	39	81	53	6	7	3	10	20
1994–95	Minnesota Moose	IHL	62	18	24	42	26	3	1	1	2	0
1995–96	Minnesota Moose	IHL	60	21	22	43	40	—	—	—	—	—
1995–96	Detroit Vipers	IHL	14	5	6	11	12	4	0	1	1	6
1996–97	Detroit Vipers	IHL	52	9	9	18	85	21	2	1	3	34
1997–98	Eisbären Berlin	DEL	47	12	14	26	58	9	1	0	1	30
1998–99	Eisbären Berlin	DEL	49	16	13	29	157	8	4	1	5	24
1999–2000	Eisbären Berlin	DEL	52	12	12	24	129	—	—	—	—	—
2000–01	Berlin Capitals	DEL	48	15	14	29	208	4	0	1	1	30
2001–02	Berlin Capitals	DEL	54	25	17	42	90	—	—	—	—	—
2002–03	Eisbären Berlin	DEL	47	16	26	42	46	9	1	2	3	12
2003–04	Eisbären Berlin	DEL	42	6	9	15	112	11	1	6	7	34
2004–05	Berliner SC Preussen	DEU.3	46	12	28	40	181	5	0	0	0	28
NHL totals			280	48	40	88	310	29	5	7	12	50
AHL totals			229	116	116	232	234	32	17	10	27	51
DEL totals			339	102	105	207	800	41	7	10	17	130

Preceded by Kevin Hatcher	Washington Capitals first-round draft pick 1985	Succeeded by Jeff Greenlaw
