= Jim Storm (ice hockey) =

American ice hockey player (born 1971)

- Born: February 5, 1971 (age 54); Milford, Michigan, U.S.
- Height: 6 ft 2 in (188 cm)
- Weight: 201 lb (91 kg; 14 st 5 lb)
- Position: Left wing
- Shot: Left
- Played for: Dallas Stars; Hartford Whalers
- National team: United States
- NHL draft: 75th overall, 1991; Hartford Whalers
- Playing career: 1993–1998

James David Storm (born February 5, 1971) is an American former professional ice hockey player.

== Early life ==
Storm was born in Milford, Michigan. As a youth, he played in the 1984 Quebec International Pee-Wee Hockey Tournament with the Detroit Little Caesars minor ice hockey team.

== Career ==
Storm played 84 games in the National Hockey League for the Dallas Stars and Hartford Whalers.

== Career statistics ==
=== Regular season and playoffs ===
			Regular season					Playoffs
Season	Team	League	GP	G	A	Pts	PIM	GP	G	A	Pts	PIM
1988–89	Detroit Compuware Ambassadors	NAHL	60	30	45	75	50	—	—	—	—	—
1989–90	Detroit Compuware Ambassadors	NAHL	55	38	73	111	58	—	—	—	—	—
1990–91	Michigan Technological University	WCHA	36	16	18	34	46	—	—	—	—	—
1991–92	Michigan Technological University	WCHA	39	25	33	58	12	—	—	—	—	—
1992–93	Michigan Technological University	WCHA	33	22	32	54	30	—	—	—	—	—
1993–94	Hartford Whalers	NHL	68	6	10	16	27	—	—	—	—	—
1993–94	United States National Team	Intl	28	8	12	20	14	—	—	—	—	—
1994–95	Hartford Whalers	NHL	6	0	3	3	0	—	—	—	—	—
1994–95	Springfield Falcons	AHL	33	11	11	22	29	—	—	—	—	—
1995–96	Dallas Stars	NHL	10	1	2	3	17	—	—	—	—	—
1995–96	Michigan K-Wings	IHL	60	18	33	51	27	10	4	8	12	2
1996–97	Michigan K-Wings	IHL	75	25	24	49	27	4	0	1	1	4
1997–98	Utah Grizzlies	IHL	5	0	0	0	0	—	—	—	—	—
IHL totals			140	43	57	100	56	14	4	9	13	6
NHL totals			84	7	15	22	44	—	—	—	—	—

=== International ===
Year	Team	Event	GP	G	A	Pts	PIM
1991	United States	WJC	7	3	4	7	0
Junior totals			7	3	4	7	0
