= Jeff Greenlaw =

Canadian ice hockey player (born 1968)

- Born: February 28, 1968 (age 58) Aylmer, Ontario, Canada
- Height: 6 ft 1 in (185 cm)
- Weight: 230 lb (104 kg; 16 st 6 lb)
- Position: Left wing
- Shot: Left
- Played for: Washington Capitals; Florida Panthers
- National team: Canada
- NHL draft: 19th overall, 1986; Washington Capitals
- Playing career: 1986–2003

Jeff Carl Greenlaw (born February 28, 1968) is a former Canadian ice hockey player. He played 57 games in the National Hockey League with the Washington Capitals and Florida Panthers between 1986 and 1994. Greenlaw was born in Aylmer, Ontario.

== Playing career ==
A former member of the Canadian National Team, Greenlaw was selected by the Washington Capitals in the 1986 NHL entry draft, but spent most of his time in the minors. In 1993, Greenlaw signed as a free agent with the expansion Florida Panthers, but again spent most of his time in the minors with the Cincinnati Cyclones.

After several years with the Cyclones, he signed with the Austin Ice Bats of the Central Hockey League, where upon his retirement from active play he would become head coach of the team for a time.

== Career statistics ==
=== Regular season and playoffs ===
			Regular season					Playoffs
Season	Team	League	GP	G	A	Pts	PIM	GP	G	A	Pts	PIM
1983–84	St. Catharines Falcons	GHL	40	28	27	55	94	—	—	—	—	—
1984–85	St. Catharines Falcons	GHL	33	21	29	50	141	—	—	—	—	—
1985–86	Canadian National Team	Intl	57	3	16	19	81	—	—	—	—	—
1986–87	Washington Capitals	NHL	22	0	3	3	44	—	—	—	—	—
1986–87	Binghamton Whalers	AHL	4	0	2	2	0	—	—	—	—	—
1987–88	Binghamton Whalers	AHL	56	8	7	15	142	1	0	0	0	2
1987–88	Washington Capitals	NHL	—	—	—	—	—	1	0	0	0	19
1988–89	Baltimore Skipjacks	AHL	55	12	15	27	115	—	—	—	—	—
1989–90	Baltimore Skipjacks	AHL	10	3	2	5	26	7	1	0	1	13
1990–91	Washington Capitals	NHL	10	2	0	2	10	1	0	0	0	2
1990–91	Baltimore Skipjacks	AHL	50	17	17	34	93	3	1	1	2	2
1991–92	Washington Capitals	NHL	5	0	1	1	34	—	—	—	—	—
1991–92	Baltimore Skipjacks	AHL	37	6	8	14	57	—	—	—	—	—
1992–93	Washington Capitals	NHL	16	1	1	2	18	—	—	—	—	—
1992–93	Baltimore Skipjacks	AHL	49	12	14	26	66	7	3	1	4	0
1993–94	Florida Panthers	NHL	4	0	1	1	2	—	—	—	—	—
1993–94	Cincinnati Cyclones	IHL	55	14	15	29	85	11	2	2	4	28
1994–95	Cincinnati Cyclones	IHL	67	10	21	31	117	10	2	0	2	22
1995–96	Cincinnati Cyclones	IHL	64	17	15	32	112	17	2	4	6	36
1996–97	Cincinnati Cyclones	IHL	27	6	6	12	70	1	0	1	1	2
1997–98	Cincinnati Cyclones	IHL	70	6	9	15	130	9	0	2	2	36
1998–99	Austin Ice Bats	WPHL	52	25	15	40	183	—	—	—	—	—
1999–00	Austin Ice Bats	WPHL	52	19	23	42	150	10	2	3	5	12
2000–01	Austin Ice Bats	WPHL	49	10	21	31	109	4	1	0	1	12
2001–02	Austin Ice Bats	CHL	50	10	18	28	72	15	4	1	5	56
2002–03	Austin Ice Bats	CHL	49	4	6	10	88	15	0	2	2	26
AHL totals			261	58	65	123	499	18	5	2	7	17
IHL totals			283	53	66	119	514	48	6	9	15	24
NHL totals			57	3	6	9	108	2	0	0	0	21

=== International ===
Year	Team	Event	GP	G	A	Pts	PIM
1986	Canada	WJC	7	3	1	4	4
Junior totals			7	3	1	4	4

Preceded by Yvon Corriveau	Washington Capitals first-round draft pick 1986	Succeeded by Reggie Savage
