= Doug Houda =

Canadian ice hockey player (born 1966)

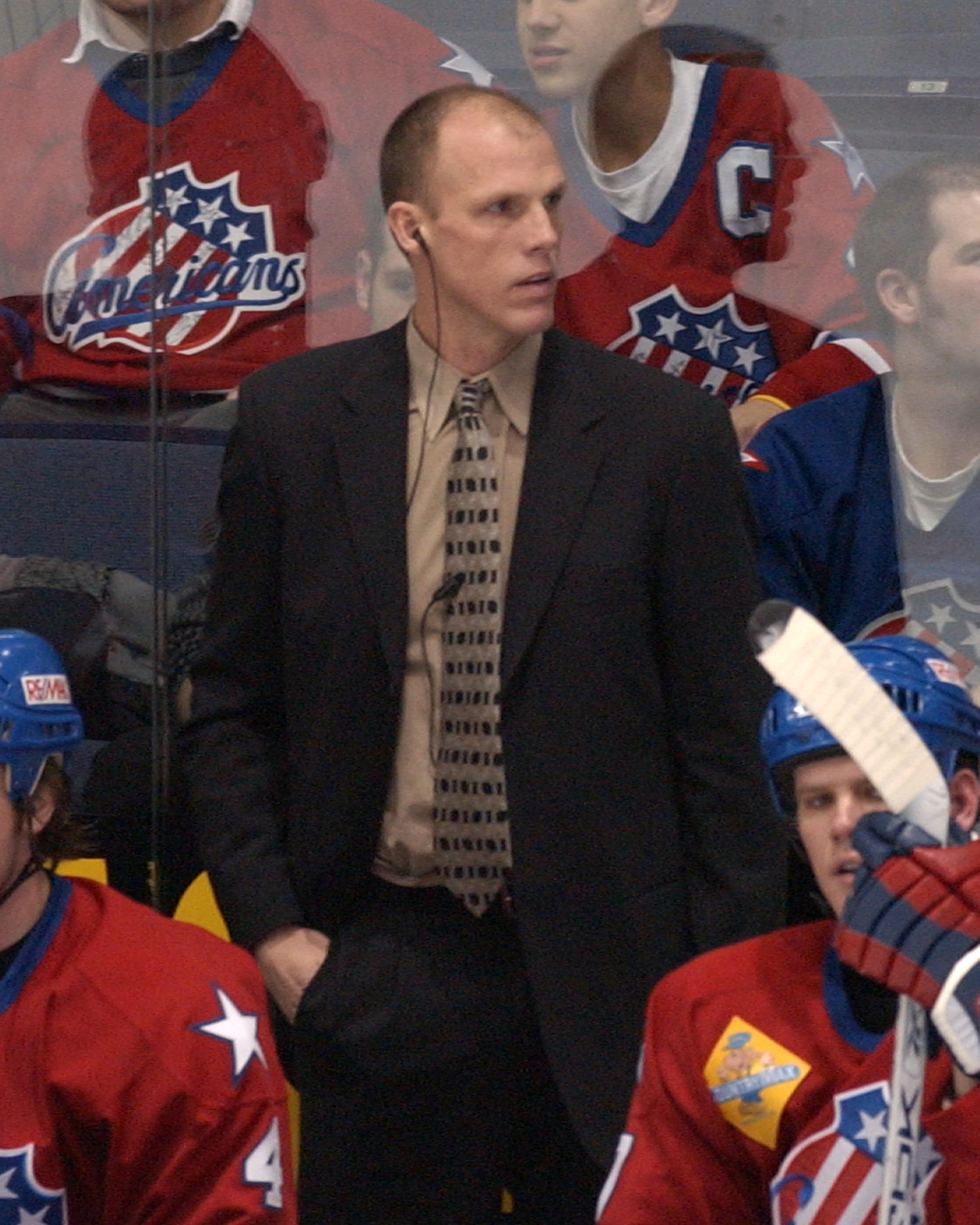
- Houda in 2004
- Born: June 3, 1966 (age 60) Blairmore, Alberta, Canada
- Height: 6 ft 2 in (188 cm)
- Weight: 209 lb (95 kg; 14 st 13 lb)
- Position: Defence
- Shot: Right
- Played for: Detroit Red Wings; Hartford Whalers; Los Angeles Kings; Buffalo Sabres; New York Islanders; Mighty Ducks of Anaheim
- NHL draft: 28th overall, 1984; Detroit Red Wings
- Playing career: 1986–2003
- Coaching career: 2004–present

Douglas Harold Houda (born June 3, 1966) is a Canadian former National Hockey League (NHL) defenceman and coach who is currently an assistant coach for the San Jose Sharks. He has served as an assistant coach for the Boston Bruins, Detroit Red Wings, and New York Islanders. He was drafted in the second round, 28th overall, by the Red Wings in the 1984 NHL Entry Draft.

== Playing career ==
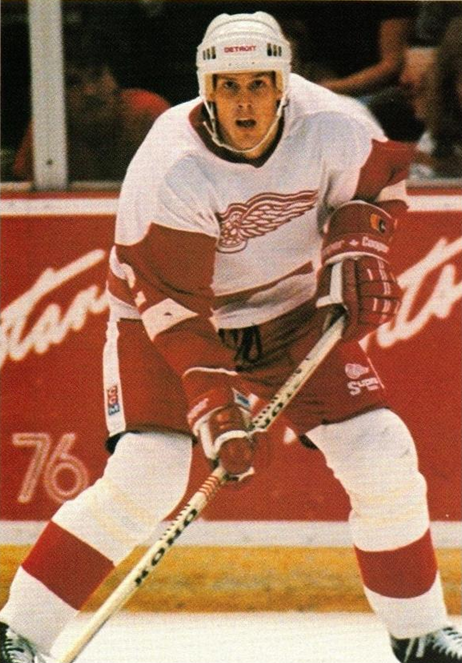
1987 card of Houda for Detroit Red Wings

After playing five seasons with the Western Hockey League's Calgary Wranglers and Medicine Hat Tigers, Houda made his NHL debut with the Red Wings near the end of the 1985–86 season.

Houda was a journeyman throughout his career, playing for the Red Wings, Hartford Whalers, Los Angeles Kings, Buffalo Sabres, New York Islanders, and Mighty Ducks of Anaheim in his NHL travels. He also spent a great deal of time in the minor leagues playing for the Kalamazoo Wings and Utah Grizzlies in the IHL, and the Adirondack Red Wings and Rochester Americans with whom he won the Calder Cup in 1996 in the AHL. After returning to Rochester in 1999 and serving as the Amerks captain in his final season, Houda retired after the 2002–03 season and immediately became an assistant coach under Randy Cunneyworth in Rochester.

== Coaching career ==
On July 25, 2006, Houda was named an assistant coach for the Boston Bruins. He won a Stanley Cup with the team in 2011. He was relieved of his duties following the 2015–16 season, after 10 seasons with the Bruins. During Houda's 10 seasons with the club, the Bruins compiled a 428–264–94 record, seventh-best in the NHL over that span. Boston's 57 playoff wins over the same duration are fourth-most in the league, trailing only Chicago (76), Detroit (66) and Pittsburgh (66). Houda also spent three seasons as an assistant coach in the American Hockey League with the Rochester Americans from 2003–06. The Amerks compiled a 125–86–16–13 record in the span and held the league's best record in 2004–05 at 51–19–4–6 (112 points).

On May 10, 2016, Houda was named an assistant coach for the Detroit Red Wings He was relieved of his position following the conclusion of the 2021-2022 season. He spent six years with the Red Wings.

On July 5, 2022, the New York Islanders announced that Doug Houda and Brian Wiseman have been brought on as assistant coaches under Lane Lambert.

On June 29, 2024, the Islanders announced they fired Houda as assistant coach. Houda was named an assistant coach for the San Jose Sharks on July 3, 2024.

== Career statistics ==
=== Regular season and playoffs ===
			Regular season					Playoffs
Season	Team	League	GP	G	A	Pts	PIM	GP	G	A	Pts	PIM
1981–82	Calgary Canucks	AMHL	—	—	—	—	—	—	—	—	—	—
1981–82	Calgary Wranglers	WHL	3	0	0	0	2	—	—	—	—	—
1982–83	Calgary Wranglers	WHL	71	5	23	28	99	16	1	3	4	44
1983–84	Calgary Wranglers	WHL	69	6	30	36	195	4	0	0	0	7
1984–85	Calgary Wranglers	WHL	65	20	54	74	182	8	3	4	7	29
1984–85	Kalamazoo Wings	IHL	—	—	—	—	—	7	0	2	2	10
1985–86	Detroit Red Wings	NHL	6	0	0	0	4	—	—	—	—	—
1985–86	Calgary Wranglers	WHL	16	4	10	14	60	—	—	—	—	—
1985–86	Medicine Hat Tigers	WHL	35	9	23	32	80	25	4	19	23	64
1986–87	Adirondack Red Wings	AHL	77	6	23	29	142	11	1	8	9	50
1987–88	Detroit Red Wings	NHL	11	1	1	2	10	—	—	—	—	—
1987–88	Adirondack Red Wings	AHL	71	10	32	42	169	11	0	3	3	44
1988–89	Detroit Red Wings	NHL	57	2	11	13	67	6	0	1	1	0
1988–89	Adirondack Red Wings	AHL	7	0	3	3	8	—	—	—	—	—
1989–90	Detroit Red Wings	NHL	73	2	9	11	127	—	—	—	—	—
1990–91	Detroit Red Wings	NHL	22	0	4	4	43	—	—	—	—	—
1990–91	Adirondack Red Wings	AHL	38	9	17	26	67	—	—	—	—	—
1990–91	Hartford Whalers	NHL	19	1	2	3	41	6	0	0	0	8
1991–92	Hartford Whalers	NHL	56	3	6	9	125	6	0	2	2	13
1992–93	Hartford Whalers	NHL	60	2	6	8	167	—	—	—	—	—
1993–94	Hartford Whalers	NHL	7	0	0	0	23	—	—	—	—	—
1993–94	Los Angeles Kings	NHL	54	2	6	8	165	—	—	—	—	—
1994–95	Buffalo Sabres	NHL	28	1	2	3	68	—	—	—	—	—
1995–96	Buffalo Sabres	NHL	38	1	3	4	52	—	—	—	—	—
1995–96	Rochester Americans	AHL	21	1	6	7	41	19	3	5	8	30
1996–97	New York Islanders	NHL	70	2	8	10	99	—	—	—	—	—
1996–97	Utah Grizzlies	IHL	3	0	0	0	7	—	—	—	—	—
1997–98	New York Islanders	NHL	31	1	2	3	47	—	—	—	—	—
1997–98	Mighty Ducks of Anaheim	NHL	24	1	2	3	52	—	—	—	—	—
1998–99	Detroit Red Wings	NHL	3	0	1	1	0	—	—	—	—	—
1998–99	Adirondack Red Wings	AHL	73	7	21	28	122	3	0	1	1	4
1999–00	Buffalo Sabres	NHL	1	0	0	0	12	—	—	—	—	—
1999–00	Rochester Americans	AHL	79	7	17	24	175	21	1	8	9	39
2000–01	Rochester Americans	AHL	43	6	20	26	106	4	0	0	0	4
2001–02	Rochester Americans	AHL	64	6	22	28	170	2	0	0	0	4
2002–03	Buffalo Sabres	NHL	1	0	0	0	2	—	—	—	—	—
2002–03	Rochester Americans	AHL	77	3	22	25	191	3	0	2	2	22
NHL totals			561	19	63	82	1104	18	0	3	3	21

== Awards ==
- WHL East Second All-Star Team – 1985
- Stanley Cup – 2011
