= 1991–92 New Jersey Devils season =

National Hockey League season

1991–92 New Jersey Devils
- Division: 4th Patrick
- Conference: 5th Wales
- 1991–92 record: 38–31–11
- Home record: 24–12–4
- Road record: 14–19–7
- Goals for: 289
- Goals against: 259

Team information
- General manager: Lou Lamoriello
- Coach: Tom McVie
- Captain: Bruce Driver
- Alternate captains: Scott Stevens; Laurie Boschman
- Arena: Brendan Byrne Arena

Team leaders
- Goals: Claude Lemieux (41)
- Assists: Scott Stevens and Kevin Todd (42)
- Points: Claude Lemieux (68)
- Penalty minutes: Randy McKay (246)
- Plus/minus: Claude Vilgrain (+27)
- Wins: Chris Terreri (22)
- Goals against average: Craig Billington (3.04)

The 1991–92 New Jersey Devils season was the 18th season for the National Hockey League (NHL) franchise that was established on June 11, 1974, and 10th season since the franchise relocated from Colorado prior to the 1982–83 NHL season. For the third consecutive season, the Devils qualified for the playoffs, this time losing in the division semi-finals to the New York Rangers.

== Regular season ==
Goaltender Martin Brodeur made his debut with the Devils. Though he would only play four games during this season, he who would go on to become the franchise goaltender of the Devils.

The Devils scored the fewest power-play goals (59) and had the fewest power-play opportunities in the NHL (338).

=== Season standings ===
Patrick Division
	GP	W	L	T	GF	GA	Pts
**New York Rangers**	**80**	**50**	**25**	**5**	**321**	**246**	**105**
**Washington Capitals**	**80**	**45**	**27**	**8**	**330**	**257**	**98**
**Pittsburgh Penguins**	**80**	**39**	**32**	**9**	**343**	**308**	**87**
**New Jersey Devils**	**80**	**38**	**31**	**11**	**289**	**259**	**87**
New York Islanders	80	34	35	11	291	299	79
Philadelphia Flyers	80	32	37	11	252	273	75

Wales Conference
R		Div	GP	W	L	T	GF	GA	Pts
1	**p** – **New York Rangers**	**PAT**	**80**	**50**	**25**	**5**	**321**	**246**	**105**
2	**Washington Capitals**	**PAT**	**80**	**45**	**27**	**8**	**330**	**257**	**98**
3	**Montreal Canadiens**	**ADM**	**80**	**41**	**28**	**11**	**267**	**207**	**93**
4	**Pittsburgh Penguins**	**PAT**	**80**	**39**	**32**	**9**	**343**	**308**	**87**
5	**New Jersey Devils**	**PAT**	**80**	**38**	**31**	**11**	**289**	**259**	**87**
6	**Boston Bruins**	**ADM**	**80**	**36**	**32**	**12**	**270**	**275**	**84**
7	New York Islanders	PAT	80	34	35	11	291	299	79
8	Philadelphia Flyers	PAT	80	32	37	11	252	273	75
9	**Buffalo Sabres**	**ADM**	**80**	**31**	**37**	**12**	**289**	**299**	**74**
10	**Hartford Whalers**	**ADM**	**80**	**26**	**41**	**13**	**247**	**283**	**65**
11	Quebec Nordiques	ADM	80	20	48	12	255	318	52

Divisions: ADM – Adams, PAT – Patrick

p – Clinched Presidents' Trophy
bold – Qualified for playoffs

== Schedule and results ==
1991–92 regular season
October

Game	Result	Date	Score	Opponent	Record
1	W	October 5, 1991	7–2	St. Louis Blues	1–0–0
2	W	October 6, 1991	4–2	@ Chicago Blackhawks	2–0–0
3	W	October 8, 1991	6–5	Quebec Nordiques	3–0–0
4	W	October 12, 1991	4–1	Pittsburgh Penguins	4–0–0
5	L	October 13, 1991	2–4	@ Philadelphia Flyers	4–1–0
6	L	October 16, 1991	2–4	@ New York Rangers	4–2–0
7	L	October 18, 1991	5–6	@ Washington Capitals	4–3–0
8	L	October 19, 1991	1–5	Washington Capitals	4–4–0
9	W	October 22, 1991	5–2	Los Angeles Kings	5–4–0
10	W	October 24, 1991	4–2	@ Pittsburgh Penguins	6–4–0
11	W	October 26, 1991	9–0	San Jose Sharks	7–4–0
12	L	October 29, 1991	3–4	@ Vancouver Canucks	7–5–0
13	W	October 30, 1991	5–2	@ Calgary Flames	8–5–0

November

Game	Result	Date	Score	Opponent	Record
14	W	November 1, 1991	3–1	@ Edmonton Oilers	9–5–0
15	L	November 4, 1991	2–3 OT	@ Montreal Canadiens	9–6–0
16	W	November 8, 1991	3–2	Montreal Canadiens	10–6–0
17	L	November 9, 1991	0–4	@ Boston Bruins	10–7–0
18	W	November 12, 1991	5–2	Philadelphia Flyers	11–7–0
19	L	November 14, 1991	3–4	New York Islanders	11–8–0
20	L	November 16, 1991	0–1	Winnipeg Jets	11–9–0
21	W	November 20, 1991	6–5 OT	Washington Capitals	12–9–0
22	W	November 22, 1991	8–2	Hartford Whalers	13–9–0
23	T	November 23, 1991	5–5 OT	@ Philadelphia Flyers	13–9–1
24	L	November 27, 1991	4–8	@ Pittsburgh Penguins	13–10–1
25	W	November 30, 1991	4–1	@ Los Angeles Kings	14–10–1

December

Game	Result	Date	Score	Opponent	Record
26	W	December 5, 1991	6–3	Calgary Flames	15–10–1
27	T	December 7, 1991	2–2 OT	Detroit Red Wings	15–10–2
28	T	December 8, 1991	2–2 OT	@ Philadelphia Flyers	15–10–3
29	L	December 10, 1991	3–4	@ Minnesota North Stars	15–11–3
30	L	December 13, 1991	3–4	Pittsburgh Penguins	15–12–3
31	T	December 14, 1991	3–3 OT	@ New York Islanders	15–12–4
32	W	December 19, 1991	4–1	@ Hartford Whalers	16–12–4
33	T	December 21, 1991	1–1 OT	Chicago Blackhawks	16–12–5
34	L	December 23, 1991	0–3	@ New York Rangers	16–13–5
35	T	December 26, 1991	5–5 OT	@ New York Islanders	16–13–6
36	W	December 28, 1991	3–0	Buffalo Sabres	17–13–6
37	L	December 29, 1991	3–4	Washington Capitals	17–14–6
38	W	December 31, 1991	7–4	@ Pittsburgh Penguins	18–14–6

January

Game	Result	Date	Score	Opponent	Record
39	W	January 2, 1992	4–0	Pittsburgh Penguins	19–14–6
40	W	January 4, 1992	6–4	New York Rangers	20–14–6
41	W	January 9, 1992	4–3	St. Louis Blues	21–14–6
42	L	January 11, 1992	3–4	Toronto Maple Leafs	21–15–6
43	W	January 12, 1992	5–2	Los Angeles Kings	22–15–6
44	T	January 15, 1992	8–8 OT	Buffalo Sabres	22–15–7
45	W	January 24, 1992	5–2	@ Washington Capitals	23–15–7
46	L	January 25, 1992	0–7	Detroit Red Wings	23–16–7
47	W	January 29, 1992	4–3	@ Montreal Canadiens	24–16–7
48	W	January 31, 1992	6–3	@ Detroit Red Wings	25–16–7

February

Game	Result	Date	Score	Opponent	Record
49	L	February 1, 1992	4–6	@ Toronto Maple Leafs	25–17–7
50	W	February 4, 1992	3–1	Philadelphia Flyers	26–17–7
51	L	February 6, 1992	1–4	@ St. Louis Blues	26–18–7
52	W	February 8, 1992	6–4	@ Boston Bruins	27–18–7
53	W	February 9, 1992	2–1	@ Quebec Nordiques	28–18–7
54	W	February 13, 1992	5–3	Vancouver Canucks	29–18–7
55	W	February 15, 1992	4–1	Hartford Whalers	30–18–7
56	W	February 16, 1992	4–2	New York Rangers	31–18–7
57	W	February 18, 1992	4–3 OT	Philadelphia Flyers	32–18–7
58	T	February 20, 1992	4–4 OT	@ Chicago Blackhawks	32–18–8
59	L	February 21, 1992	4–6	@ Winnipeg Jets	32–19–8
60	L	February 24, 1992	1–3	Minnesota North Stars	32–20–8
61	T	February 25, 1992	5–5 OT	@ Toronto Maple Leafs	32–20–9
62	L	February 28, 1992	2–3 OT	New York Islanders	32–21–9
63	W	February 29, 1992	3–1	@ New York Islanders	33–21–9

March

Game	Result	Date	Score	Opponent	Record
64	L	March 2, 1992	1–7	New York Rangers	33–22–9
65	W	March 4, 1992	5–4	@ New York Rangers	34–22–9
66	L	March 6, 1992	4–5	@ Buffalo Sabres	34–23–9
67	L	March 7, 1992	2–3 OT	@ Washington Capitals	34–24–9
68	T	March 11, 1992	2–2 OT	@ Edmonton Oilers	34–24–10
69	L	March 12, 1992	1–2	@ Vancouver Canucks	34–25–10
70	L	March 14, 1992	2–3	@ San Jose Sharks	34–26–10
71	L	March 19, 1992	3–5	Edmonton Oilers	34–27–10
72	T	March 21, 1992	2–2 OT	New York Islanders	34–27–11
73	L	March 22, 1992	3–6	@ New York Rangers	34–28–11
74	W	March 24, 1992	4–3	San Jose Sharks	35–28–11
75	W	March 26, 1992	4–2	Boston Bruins	36–28–11
76	W	March 28, 1992	5–2	Quebec Nordiques	37–28–11
77	L	March 29, 1992	4–5	@ Philadelphia Flyers	37–29–11

April

Game	Result	Date	Score	Opponent	Record
78	L	April 12, 1992	3–4 OT	Washington Capitals	37–30–11
79	W	April 13, 1992	5–1	Pittsburgh Penguins	38–30–11
80	L	April 15, 1992	0–7	@ New York Islanders	38–31–11

Legend: Win (2 points) Loss (0 points) Tie (1 point)

== Playoffs ==
=== Patrick Division Semifinals ===
==== (P4) New Jersey Devils vs. (P1) New York Rangers ====
The series opened at Madison Square Garden. The Rangers won game 1 4–2, but the Devils tied up the series in game 2 with a 7-3 drubbing over New York. Games 3 and 4 were at the Meadowlands in New Jersey. In game 3, the Devils were victorious by a score of 3–1. But in game 4, the Rangers blanked the Devils 3–0. Game 5 shifted back to New York, where the Rangers took a commanding 3–2 series lead by defeating the Devils 8–5. Game 6 was at the Meadowlands and the Devils won 5–3 tying up the series at 3 games apiece. Game 7 shifted back to Madison Square Garden where the Rangers won 8–4 over New Jersey and won the series 4–3.

== Player statistics ==
=== Regular season ===
Scoring

Player	Pos	GP	G	A	Pts	PIM	+/-	PPG	SHG	GWG
Claude Lemieux	RW	74	41	27	68	109	9	13	1	8
Stephane Richer	RW	74	29	35	64	25	-1	5	1	6
Kevin Todd	C	80	21	42	63	69	8	2	0	2
Peter Stastny	C	66	24	38	62	42	6	10	1	3
Scott Stevens	D	68	17	42	59	124	24	7	1	2
Claude Vilgrain	RW	71	19	27	46	74	27	1	1	1
Bruce Driver	D	78	7	35	42	66	5	3	1	1
Alexei Kasatonov	D	76	12	28	40	70	14	3	2	1
Tom Chorske	LW	76	19	17	36	32	8	0	3	2
Randy McKay	RW	80	17	16	33	246	6	2	0	1
Eric Weinrich	D	76	7	25	32	55	10	5	0	0
Valeri Zelepukin	LW	44	13	18	31	28	11	3	0	3
Doug Brown	RW	71	11	17	28	27	17	1	2	1
Laurie Boschman	C	75	8	20	28	121	9	0	0	2
Viacheslav Fetisov	D	70	3	23	26	108	11	0	0	1
David Maley	LW	37	7	11	18	58	0	1	0	0
Dave Barr	RW	41	6	12	18	32	9	0	1	0
Zdeno Ciger	LW	20	6	5	11	10	-2	1	0	0
Alexander Semak	C	25	5	6	11	0	5	0	0	1
Pat Conacher	LW	44	7	3	10	16	0	0	1	1
Ken Daneyko	D	80	1	7	8	170	7	0	0	0
Troy Mallette	LW	17	3	4	7	43	7	0	0	0
Jarrod Skalde	C	15	2	4	6	4	-1	0	0	2
Patrik Sundstrom	C	17	1	3	4	8	-5	1	0	0
Tommy Albelin	D	19	0	4	4	4	7	0	0	0
Jon Morris	C	7	1	2	3	6	-6	1	0	0
Walt Poddubny	LW	7	1	2	3	6	-1	0	0	0
Myles O'Connor	D	9	0	2	2	13	-2	0	0	0
Neil Brady	C	7	1	0	1	4	1	0	0	0
Craig Billington	G	26	0	1	1	2	0	0	0	0
Bill Guerin	RW	5	0	1	1	9	1	0	0	0
Scott Niedermayer	D	4	0	1	1	2	1	0	0	0
Chris Terreri	G	54	0	1	1	13	0	0	0	0
Martin Brodeur	G	4	0	0	0	0	0	0	0	0
Jeff Christian	LW	2	0	0	0	2	0	0	0	0
Jim Dowd	C	1	0	0	0	0	0	0	0	0
Chad Erickson	G	2	0	0	0	0	0	0	0	0
Jason Miller	LW	3	0	0	0	0	0	0	0	0
Allan Stewart	LW	1	0	0	0	5	0	0	0	0

Goaltending

Player	MIN	GP	W	L	T	GA	GAA	SO	SA	SV	SV%
Chris Terreri	3186	54	22	22	10	169	3.18	1	1511	1342	.888
Craig Billington	1363	26	13	7	1	69	3.04	2	637	568	.892
Martin Brodeur	179	4	2	1	0	10	3.35	0	85	75	.882
Chad Erickson	120	2	1	1	0	9	4.50	0	55	46	.836
Team:	4848	80	38	31	11	257	3.18	3	2288	2031	.888

=== Playoffs ===
Scoring

Player	Pos	GP	G	A	Pts	PIM	PPG	SHG	GWG
Peter Stastny	C	7	3	7	10	19	0	0	0
Claude Lemieux	RW	7	4	3	7	26	1	0	0
Zdeno Ciger	LW	7	2	4	6	0	0	0	1
Kevin Todd	C	7	3	2	5	8	1	0	0
Randy McKay	RW	7	1	3	4	10	1	0	0
Bruce Driver	D	7	0	4	4	2	0	0	0
Bill Guerin	RW	6	3	0	3	4	0	0	0
Scott Stevens	D	7	2	1	3	29	2	0	1
Stephane Richer	RW	7	1	2	3	0	0	0	0
Tom Chorske	LW	7	0	3	3	4	0	0	0
Ken Daneyko	D	7	0	3	3	16	0	0	0
Viacheslav Fetisov	D	6	0	3	3	8	0	0	0
Tommy Albelin	D	1	1	1	2	0	0	0	0
Pat Conacher	LW	7	1	1	2	4	0	1	0
Alexei Kasatonov	D	7	1	1	2	12	0	0	0
Claude Vilgrain	RW	7	1	1	2	17	0	0	0
Valeri Zelepukin	LW	4	1	1	2	2	0	0	0
Janne Ojanen	C	3	0	2	2	0	0	0	0
Eric Weinrich	D	7	0	2	2	4	0	0	0
Laurie Boschman	C	7	1	0	1	8	0	0	1
Martin Brodeur	G	1	0	0	0	0	0	0	0
Alexander Semak	C	1	0	0	0	0	0	0	0
Chris Terreri	G	7	0	0	0	0	0	0	0

Goaltending

Player	MIN	GP	W	L	GA	GAA	SO	SA	SV	SV%
Chris Terreri	386	7	3	3	23	3.58	0	203	180	.887
Martin Brodeur	32	1	0	1	3	5.63	0	15	12	.800
Team:	418	7	3	4	26	3.73	0	218	192	.881

Note: GP = Games played; G = Goals; A = Assists; Pts = Points; +/- = Plus/minus; PIM = Penalty minutes; PPG = Power-play goals; SHG = Short-handed goals; GWG = Game-winning goals
MIN = Minutes played; W = Wins; L = Losses; T = Ties; GA = Goals against; GAA = Goals against average; SO = Shutouts; SA = Shots against; SV = Shots saved; SV% = Save percentage;

== Awards and records ==
=== Awards ===
Regular Season
Player	Award	Awarded
Kevin Todd	NHL All-Rookie Team – Forward	End of regular season

== Draft picks ==
The Devils' draft picks at the 1991 NHL entry draft.

Rd #	Pick #	Player	Nat	Pos	Team (League)	Notes
1	3	Scott Niedermayer	Canada	D	Kamloops Blazers (WHL)	(Note: The Devils acquired the 1991 first-round pick from Toronto for Tom Kurvers on October 16, 1989.)
1	11	Brian Rolston	United States	LW	Detroit Compuware (NAHL)	
2	33	Donevan Hextall	Canada	C	Prince Albert Raiders (WHL)	
3	55	Fredrik Bremberg	Sweden	RW	Djurgårdens IF (Elitserien)	
4	77	Brad Willner	United States	D	Richfield H.S. (Minnesota)	
5	99	No fifth-round pick				(Note: The Devils traded their 1991 fifth-round pick (used on Yan Kaminsky) to Winnipeg for Laurie Boschman on September 6, 1990.)
6	121	Curtis Regnier	Canada	LW	Prince Albert Raiders (WHL)	
7	143	Dave Craievich	Canada	D	Oshawa Generals (OHL)	
8	165	Paul Wolanski	Canada	D	Niagara Falls Thunder (OHL)	
9	187	Dan Reimann	United States	D	Anoka H.S. (Minnesota)	
10	209	No tenth-round pick				(Note: The Devils traded their 1991 tenth-round pick (used on Rob Leask) to Washington for Peter Sundstrom on June 19, 1989.)
11	231	Kevin Riehl	Canada	C	Medicine Hat Tigers (WHL)	
12	253	Jason Hehr	Canada	D	Kelowna Spartans (BCJHL)	
S	17	Rob Kruhlak	Canada	G	Northern Michigan University (CCHA)	
