= Frank Pietrangelo =

Canadian ice hockey player

- Born: December 17, 1964 (age 61) Niagara Falls, Ontario, Canada
- Height: 5 ft 10 in (178 cm)
- Weight: 185 lb (84 kg; 13 st 3 lb)
- Position: Goaltender
- Caught: Left
- Played for: Pittsburgh Penguins; Hartford Whalers; HC Bolzano; Kaufbeurer Adler; Asiago HC; Manchester Storm
- NHL draft: 67th overall, 1983; Pittsburgh Penguins
- Playing career: 1986–2001

Frank Pietrangelo (born December 17, 1964) is a Canadian former professional ice hockey goaltender. He played 141 games in the National Hockey League with the Pittsburgh Penguins and Hartford Whalers between 1987 and 1994. He won the Stanley Cup with the Penguins in 1991. After his playing career he became involved in leadership and ownership of the Niagara Falls Canucks, a junior hockey club which previously competed in the Greater Ontario Junior Hockey League, then in 2023 joined the Ontario Junior Hockey League.

== Playing career ==
Born in Niagara Falls, Ontario, Pietrangelo played for the University of Minnesota between 1982 and 1986. He started his National Hockey League career with the Pittsburgh Penguins in 1988, winning the Stanley Cup in 1991. He also played for the Hartford Whalers. He left the NHL after the 1994 season. He played several more years in the IHL with the Minnesota Moose, Italy with HC Bolzano and Asiago Hockey AS, Germany in the DEL with Kaufbeurer Adler, and England in the BISL with the Manchester Storm before retiring after the 2001 season. He was named the Sekonda Face to Watch while playing for Manchester in December 1998.

Pietrangelo played in the 1991 Stanley Cup playoffs in place of injured Penguins' starting goaltender Tom Barrasso. In game six of the opening round against the New Jersey Devils, he helped the Penguins stave off elimination with one of the most significant stops in Stanley Cup history, a glove save against Peter Stastny, who was shooting at a mostly-open net at point-blank range. He helped the Penguins win the game and keep them alive in the series. He then shut the Devils out in game seven to allow the team to advance to the next round, Barrasso to heal, and the Penguins to go on to win the Stanley Cup for the first time, beating the Minnesota North Stars.

Pietrangelo is cousin once-removed to NHL defenceman Alex Pietrangelo.

== Career statistics ==
=== Regular season and playoffs ===
			Regular season									Playoffs
Season	Team	League	GP	W	L	T	MIN	GA	SO	GAA	SV%	GP	W	L	MIN	GA	SO	GAA	SV%
1979–80	Niagara Falls Canucks	GHL	12	—	—	—	452	40	0	5.31	—	—	—	—	—	—	—	—	—
1980–81	Brampton Warriors	OPJAHL	28	—	—	—	1650	159	0	5.78	—	—	—	—	—	—	—	—	—
1981–82	Brampton Warriors	OPJAHL	36	30	4	1	2129	112	1	3.09	—	—	—	—	—	—	—	—	—
1982–83	University of Minnesota	WCHA	25	16	6	1	1348	80	1	3.56	.885	—	—	—	—	—	—	—	—
1983–84	University of Minnesota	WCHA	20	13	7	0	1141	66	0	3.47	.887	—	—	—	—	—	—	—	—
1984–85	University of Minnesota	WCHA	17	8	3	3	912	52	0	3.42	.873	—	—	—	—	—	—	—	—
1985–86	University of Minnesota	WCHA	23	15	7	0	1284	76	0	3.55	.880	—	—	—	—	—	—	—	—
1986–87	Muskegon Lumberjacks	IHL	35	23	11	0	2090	119	2	3.42	—	15	10	4	923	46	0	2.99	—
1987–88	Pittsburgh Penguins	NHL	21	9	11	0	1203	80	1	3.99	.866	—	—	—	—	—	—	—	—
1987–88	Muskegon Lumberjacks	IHL	15	11	3	1	868	43	2	2.97	—	—	—	—	—	—	—	—	—
1988–89	Pittsburgh Penguins	NHL	15	5	3	0	670	45	0	4.03	.890	—	—	—	—	—	—	—	—
1988–89	Muskegon Lumberjacks	IHL	13	10	1	0	760	38	1	3.00	—	9	8	1	566	29	0	3.07	—
1989–90	Pittsburgh Penguins	NHL	21	8	6	2	1067	77	0	4.33	.867	—	—	—	—	—	—	—	—
1989–90	Muskegon Lumberjacks	IHL	12	9	2	1	691	38	0	3.30	—	—	—	—	—	—	—	—	—
1990–91	Pittsburgh Penguins	NHL	23	10	11	1	1311	86	0	3.94	.880	5	4	1	288	15	1	3.13	.899
1991–92	Pittsburgh Penguins	NHL	5	2	1	0	226	20	0	5.33	.846	—	—	—	—	—	—	—	—
1991–92	Hartford Whalers	NHL	5	3	1	1	307	12	0	2.35	.923	7	3	4	426	19	0	2.68	.922
1992–93	Hartford Whalers	NHL	30	4	15	1	1373	111	0	4.85	.858	—	—	—	—	—	—	—	—
1993–94	Hartford Whalers	NHL	19	5	11	1	985	59	0	3.60	.875	—	—	—	—	—	—	—	—
1993–94	Springfield Indians	AHL	23	9	10	2	1314	73	0	3.33	.881	6	2	4	324	23	0	4.26	.842
1994–95	Minnesota Moose	IHL	15	3	8	1	756	52	0	4.12	.870	—	—	—	—	—	—	—	—
1996–97	HC Bolzano	ITA	39	—	—	—	2340	145	0	3.73	.874	—	—	—	—	—	—	—	—
1997–98	Adler Kaufbeuren	DEL	14	—	—	—	840	45	0	3.21	.927	—	—	—	—	—	—	—	—
1998–99	Manchester Storm	BISL	38	—	—	—	—	—	—	1.92	.931	6	—	—	—	—	—	1.83	.941
1999–00	Manchester Storm	BISL	19	—	—	—	—	—	—	3.89	.866	—	—	—	—	—	—	—	—
2000–01	Manchester Storm	BISL	9	—	—	—	—	—	—	3.82	.882	—	—	—	—	—	—	—	—
NHL totals			141	46	59	6	7138	490	1	4.12	.872	12	7	5	714	34	1	2.86	.913
