= 1991–92 San Jose Sharks season =

National Hockey League team season

1991–92 San Jose Sharks
- Division: 6th Smythe
- Conference: 11th Campbell
- 1991–92 record: 17–58–5
- Home record: 14–23–3
- Road record: 3–35–2
- Goals for: 219
- Goals against: 359

Team information
- General manager: Jack Ferreira
- Coach: George Kingston
- Captain: Doug Wilson
- Alternate captains: Kelly Kisio; Neil Wilkinson
- Arena: Cow Palace
- Average attendance: 10,888
- Minor league affiliate: Kansas City Blades

Team leaders
- Goals: Pat Falloon (25)
- Assists: Pat Falloon (34)
- Points: Pat Falloon (59)
- Penalty minutes: Link Gaetz (326)
- Plus/minus: J. F. Quintin (+2)
- Wins: Jeff Hackett (11)
- Goals against average: Jeff Hackett (3.84)

The 1991–92 San Jose Sharks season was the Sharks' inaugural season. They finished in sixth place in the Smythe Division with a record of 17 wins, 58 losses, and 5 ties for 39 points. Goaltender Jeff Hackett was named team MVP.

The last remaining active member of the 1991–92 San Jose Sharks was Ray Whitney, who retired after the 2013–14 season.

== Offseason ==
=== Connection to Minnesota ===
The Gund family had been partners in the Oakland Seals franchise which was moved to Cleveland to become the NHL Cleveland Barons. This franchise was merged with the North Stars franchise and the Gunds became partners in the North Stars' franchise. The Gund family had long wanted to bring hockey back to the Bay Area, and asked the NHL for permission to move the North Stars there in the late 1980s, but were vetoed by the league. Meanwhile, a group led by former Hartford Whalers owner Howard Baldwin was pushing the NHL to bring a team to San Jose, where a new arena was being built. Eventually a compromise was struck by the league, where the Gunds would sell their share of the North Stars to Baldwin's group, with the Gunds receiving an expansion team in the Bay Area to begin play in the 1991–92 NHL season. In return, the North Stars would be allowed to participate as an equal partner in an expansion draft with the new Bay Area team. Neither team retains the history of the Seals/Barons franchise.

On May 5, 1990, the Gunds officially sold their share of the North Stars to Baldwin and were awarded a new team in the Bay Area, based in San Jose. Over 5000 potential names were submitted by mail for the new team. While the first-place finisher was "Blades", the Gunds were concerned about the name's negative connotations (weapons, etc.) and went with the runner-up, "Sharks". The name was said to have been inspired by the large number of sharks living in the Pacific Ocean. Seven different varieties live there, and one area of water near the Bay Area is known as the "red triangle" because of its shark population. The team's first marketing head, Matt Levine, said of the new name, "Sharks are relentless, determined, swift, agile, bright and fearless. We plan to build an organization that has all those qualities."

=== Drafting ===
On top of the normal expansion process, the Sharks participated in a draft to select players from the North Stars. The Sharks and Stars then participated in an expansion draft. Both teams selected in the NHL Entry Draft. The Sharks selected second-overall in the first round, and then first-overall in the following rounds. The Sharks selected Pat Falloon with their first pick, regarded widely as a draft bust.

=== Captain ===
Defenseman Doug Wilson was acquired from the Chicago Blackhawks. He was named the franchise's first team captain.

== Regular season ==
The Sharks played their first ever game on October 4, 1991, against the Vancouver Canucks at Pacific Coliseum in Vancouver, losing 4–3 to the Canucks. Craig Coxe scored the first goal in team history. The next night, on October 5, the Sharks played their first ever home game at the Cow Palace, losing 5–2 to Vancouver. The club earned their first victory during their third game, on October 8, as Kelly Kisio scored the game-winning goal at 16:45 of the third period, leading the Sharks to a 4–3 win over the Calgary Flames. Goaltender Brian Hayward made 36 saves to earn the victory.

After recording their first win, the Sharks lost their next 13 games, falling to 1–15–0, before putting together back-to-back wins over the Edmonton Oilers and New York Islanders. The team earned their first ever tie against the Detroit Red Wings on November 14, as the teams skated to a 3–3 score. On November 29, after losing their first 13 road games, the Sharks earned their first ever point on the road, as San Jose tied the Edmonton Oilers, 4–4, at Northlands Coliseum in Edmonton, Alberta. The next night, on November 30, the Sharks held off the Calgary Flames for a 2–1 victory at the Saddledome in Calgary, Alberta, earning their first ever road victory.

Throughout the season, the Sharks allowed 10 or more goals in a game three times, which included a club-record 11 goals allowed against the Detroit Red Wings on February 15, 1992, as Detroit defeated the Sharks, 11–1. The team did not earn any shutouts during the season. The most goals San Jose scored in a game was on February 26, as the Sharks defeated the Quebec Nordiques, 7–4. The team was shut out nine times, the first one being on October 23, losing 3–0 to the Hartford Whalers.

Overall, San Jose finished the season with a 17–58–5 record, earning 39 points, and sixth place in the Smythe Division, 35 points behind the fifth-place Calgary Flames, and 42 points behind the Winnipeg Jets for the final playoff position in the division.

Rookie Pat Falloon led the club with 25 goals, 34 assists and 59 points in 79 games. David Bruce was the only other Shark to score 20 or more goals, as he had 22 goals and 38 points in 60 games. Brian Mullen scored 18 goals and 46 points in 72 games. On defense, Doug Wilson had nine goals and 28 points in an injury-shortened 44 games to lead the blueline. Link Gaetz provided the team toughness, earning 326 penalty minutes in only 48 games, while chipping in with six goals and 12 points.

In goal, Jeff Hackett earned the most playing time, going 11–27–1 with a 3.82 GAA and .892 save percentage in 42 games.

The Sharks finished the season 22nd in both scoring (219 goals for) and goaltending (359 goals against).

=== Season standings ===
Smythe Division
| | GP | W | L | T | GF | GA | Pts |
|---|---|---|---|---|---|---|---|
| **Vancouver Canucks** | **80** | **42** | **26** | **12** | **285** | **250** | **96** |
| **Los Angeles Kings** | **80** | **35** | **31** | **14** | **287** | **250** | **84** |
| **Edmonton Oilers** | **80** | **36** | **34** | **10** | **295** | **297** | **82** |
| **Winnipeg Jets** | **80** | **33** | **32** | **15** | **251** | **244** | **81** |
| Calgary Flames | 80 | 31 | 37 | 12 | 296 | 305 | 74 |
| San Jose Sharks | 80 | 17 | 58 | 5 | 219 | 359 | 39 |

Campbell Conference
| R | | Div | GP | W | L | T | GF | GA | Pts |
|---|---|---|---|---|---|---|---|---|---|
| 1 | **Detroit Red Wings** | **NRS** | **80** | **43** | **25** | **12** | **320** | **256** | **98** |
| 2 | **Vancouver Canucks** | **SMY** | **80** | **42** | **26** | **12** | **285** | **250** | **96** |
| 3 | **Chicago Blackhawks** | **NRS** | **80** | **36** | **29** | **15** | **257** | **236** | **87** |
| 4 | **Los Angeles Kings** | **SMY** | **80** | **35** | **31** | **14** | **287** | **296** | **84** |
| 5 | **St. Louis Blues** | **NRS** | **80** | **36** | **33** | **11** | **279** | **266** | **83** |
| 6 | **Edmonton Oilers** | **SMY** | **80** | **36** | **34** | **10** | **295** | **297** | **82** |
| 7 | **Winnipeg Jets** | **SMY** | **80** | **33** | **32** | **15** | **251** | **244** | **81** |
| 8 | Calgary Flames | SMY | 80 | 31 | 37 | 12 | 296 | 305 | 74 |
| 9 | **Minnesota North Stars** | **NRS** | **80** | **32** | **42** | **6** | **246** | **278** | **70** |
| 10 | Toronto Maple Leafs | NRS | 80 | 30 | 43 | 7 | 234 | 294 | 67 |
| 11 | San Jose Sharks | SMY | 80 | 17 | 58 | 5 | 219 | 359 | 39 |

Divisions: NRS – Norris, SMY – Smythe
bold – Qualified for playoffs

== Schedule and results ==
1991–92 regular season
October: 1–13–0 (home: 1–4–0; road: 0–9–0)

| Game | Date | Opponent | Score | OT | Arena | Record | Points |
|---|---|---|---|---|---|---|---|
| 1 | October 4 | @ Vancouver | 3–4 | | Pacific Coliseum | 0–1–0 | 0 |
| 2 | October 5 | Vancouver | 2–5 | | Cow Palace | 0–2–0 | 0 |
| 3 | October 8 | Calgary | 4–3 | | Cow Palace | 1–2–0 | 2 |
| 4 | October 10 | Winnipeg | 4–5 | | Cow Palace | 1–3–0 | 2 |
| 5 | October 12 | @ St. Louis | 3–6 | | St. Louis Arena | 1–4–0 | 2 |
| 6 | October 13 | @ Chicago | 3–7 | | Chicago Stadium | 1–5–0 | 2 |
| 7 | October 16 | @ Los Angeles | 5–8 | | Great Western Forum | 1–6–0 | 2 |
| 8 | October 17 | Minnesota | 2–8 | | Cow Palace | 1–7–0 | 2 |
| 9 | October 19 | Boston | 1–4 | | Cow Palace | 1–8–0 | 2 |
| 10 | October 23 | @ Hartford | 0–3 | | Hartford Civic Center | 1–9–0 | 2 |
| 11 | October 25 | @ Buffalo | 1–3 | | Buffalo Memorial Auditorium | 1–10–0 | 2 |
| 12 | October 26 | @ New Jersey | 0–9 | | Brendan Byrne Arena | 1–11–0 | 2 |
| 13 | October 29 | @ NY Islanders | 4–8 | | Nassau Coliseum | 1–12–0 | 2 |
| 14 | October 31 | @ Philadelphia | 2–5 | | Spectrum | 1–13–0 | 2 |

November: 4–7–2 (home: 3–3–1; road: 1–4–1)

| Game | Date | Opponent | Score | OT | Arena | Record | Points |
|---|---|---|---|---|---|---|---|
| 15 | November 2 | @ Quebec | 3–6 | | Colisée de Québec | 1–14–0 | 2 |
| 16 | November 4 | @ Toronto | 1–4 | | Maple Leaf Gardens | 1–15–0 | 2 |
| 17 | November 8 | Edmonton | 6–2 | | Cow Palace | 2–15–0 | 4 |
| 18 | November 9 | NY Islanders | 4–3 | | Cow Palace | 3–15–0 | 6 |
| 19 | November 12 | Buffalo | 1–7 | | Cow Palace | 3–16–0 | 6 |
| 20 | November 14 | Detroit | 3–3 | OT | Cow Palace | 3–16–1 | 7 |
| 21 | November 16 | @ Vancouver | 0–1 | | Pacific Coliseum | 3–17–1 | 7 |
| 22 | November 19 | Los Angeles | 2–3 | OT | Cow Palace | 3–18–1 | 7 |
| 23 | November 22 | Toronto | 1–3 | | Cow Palace | 3–19–1 | 7 |
| 24 | November 23 | @ Los Angeles | 4–6 | | Great Western Forum | 3–20–1 | 7 |
| 25 | November 26 | Vancouver | 4–1 | | Cow Palace | 4–20–1 | 9 |
| 26 | November 29 | @ Edmonton | 4–4 | OT | Northlands Coliseum | 4–20–2 | 10 |
| 27 | November 30 | @ Calgary | 2–1 | | Olympic Saddledome | 5–20–2 | 12 |

December: 3–8–1 (home: 3–3–1; road: 0–5–0)

| Game | Date | Opponent | Score | OT | Arena | Record | Points |
|---|---|---|---|---|---|---|---|
| 28 | December 3 | Los Angeles | 3–2 | OT | Cow Palace | 6–20–2 | 14 |
| 29 | December 5 | Pittsburgh | 0–8 | | Cow Palace | 6–21–2 | 14 |
| 30 | December 8 | @ Edmonton | 1–3 | | Northlands Coliseum | 6–22–2 | 14 |
| 31 | December 10 | Winnipeg | 3–3 | OT | Cow Palace | 6–22–3 | 15 |
| 32 | December 12 | Edmonton | 6–3 | | Cow Palace | 7–22–3 | 17 |
| 33 | December 14 | Minnesota | 2–3 | | Cow Palace | 7–23–3 | 17 |
| 34 | December 16 | @ NY Rangers | 3–4 | OT | Madison Square Garden | 7–24–3 | 17 |
| 35 | December 17 | @ Pittsburgh | 2–10 | | Civic Arena | 7–25–3 | 17 |
| 36 | December 19 | @ St. Louis | 0–4 | | St. Louis Arena | 7–26–3 | 17 |
| 37 | December 21 | Quebec | 4–1 | | Cow Palace | 8–26–3 | 19 |
| 38 | December 26 | @ Los Angeles | 3–5 | | Great Western Forum | 8–27–3 | 19 |
| 39 | December 28 | Vancouver | 2–3 | | Cow Palace | 8–28–3 | 19 |

January: 3–8–1 (home: 2–4–0; road: 1–4–1)

| Game | Date | Opponent | Score | OT | Arena | Record | Points |
|---|---|---|---|---|---|---|---|
| 40 | January 3 | Philadelphia | 3–1 | | Cow Palace | 9–28–3 | 21 |
| 41 | January 4 | Montreal | 0–1 | OT | Cow Palace | 9–29–3 | 21 |
| 42 | January 7 | @ Vancouver | 1–4 | | Pacific Coliseum | 9–30–3 | 21 |
| 43 | January 8 | @ Calgary | 3–10 | | Olympic Saddledome | 9–31–3 | 21 |
| 44 | January 11 | @ Minnesota | 4–7 | | Met Center | 9–32–3 | 21 |
| 45 | January 12 | @ Winnipeg | 4–3 | | Winnipeg Arena | 10–32–3 | 23 |
| 46 | January 14 | @ Los Angeles | 3–3 | OT | Great Western Forum | 10–32–4 | 24 |
| 47 | January 21 | @ Edmonton | 2–9 | | Northlands Coliseum | 10–33–4 | 24 |
| 48 | January 24 | Calgary | 2–3 | | Cow Palace | 10–34–4 | 24 |
| 49 | January 25 | Edmonton | 5–2 | | Cow Palace | 11–34–4 | 26 |
| 50 | January 28 | NY Rangers | 2–4 | | Cow Palace | 11–35–4 | 26 |
| 51 | January 30 | St. Louis | 2–4 | | Cow Palace | 11–36–4 | 26 |

February: 3–8–1 (home: 3–3–1; road: 0–5–0)

| Game | Date | Opponent | Score | OT | Arena | Record | Points |
|---|---|---|---|---|---|---|---|
| 52 | February 2 | @ Winnipeg | 0–6 | | Winnipeg Arena | 11–37–4 | 26 |
| 53 | February 4 | Hartford | 6–5 | | Cow Palace | 12–37–4 | 28 |
| 54 | February 5 | Chicago | 5–2 | | Cow Palace | 13–37–4 | 30 |
| 55 | February 9 | @ Washington | 2–6 | | Capital Centre | 13–38–4 | 30 |
| 56 | February 12 | @ Montreal | 1–6 | | Montreal Forum | 13–39–4 | 30 |
| 57 | February 14 | @ Buffalo | 6–7 | | Buffalo Memorial Auditorium | 13–40–4 | 30 |
| 58 | February 15 | @ Detroit | 1–11 | | Joe Louis Arena | 13–41–4 | 30 |
| 59 | February 18 | Washington | 2–4 | | Cow Palace | 13–42–4 | 30 |
| 60 | February 21 | Vancouver | 3–5 | | Cow Palace | 13–43–4 | 30 |
| 61 | February 23 | Calgary | 2–4 | | Cow Palace | 13–44–4 | 30 |
| 62 | February 26 | Quebec | 7–4 | | Cow Palace | 14–44–4 | 32 |
| 63 | February 28 | Montreal | 3–3 | OT | Cow Palace | 14–44–5 | 33 |

March: 3–11–0 (home: 2–4–0; road: 1–7–0)

| Game | Date | Opponent | Score | OT | Arena | Record | Points |
|---|---|---|---|---|---|---|---|
| 64 | March 1 | Philadelphia | 0–1 | | Cow Palace | 14–45–5 | 33 |
| 65 | March 4 | Los Angeles | 3–4 | | Cow Palace | 14–46–5 | 33 |
| 66 | March 6 | Pittsburgh | 3–7 | | Cow Palace | 14–47–5 | 33 |
| 67 | March 8 | Toronto | 4–1 | | Cow Palace | 15–47–5 | 35 |
| 68 | March 10 | @ Chicago | 1–5 | | Chicago Stadium | 15–48–5 | 35 |
| 69 | March 11 | @ Winnipeg | 0–3 | | Winnipeg Arena | 15–49–5 | 35 |
| 70 | March 14 | New Jersey | 3–2 | | Cow Palace | 16–49–5 | 37 |
| 71 | March 17 | Detroit | 4–5 | | Cow Palace | 16–50–5 | 37 |
| 72 | March 19 | @ Calgary | 1–3 | | Olympic Saddledome | 16–51–5 | 37 |
| 73 | March 21 | @ Hartford | 5–4 | | Hartford Civic Center | 17–51–5 | 39 |
| 74 | March 23 | @ Boston | 6–7 | | Boston Garden | 17–52–5 | 39 |
| 75 | March 24 | @ New Jersey | 3–4 | | Brendan Byrne Arena | 17–53–5 | 39 |
| 76 | March 26 | @ NY Islanders | 4–7 | | Nassau Coliseum | 17–54–5 | 39 |
| 77 | March 29 | @ Winnipeg | 5–6 | | Winnipeg Arena | 17–55–5 | 39 |

April: 0–3–0 (home: 0–2–0; road: 0–1–0)

| Game | Date | Opponent | Score | OT | Arena | Record | Points |
|---|---|---|---|---|---|---|---|
| 78 | April 12 | @ Edmonton | 4–6 | | Northlands Coliseum | 17–56–6 | 39 |
| 79 | April 15 | Calgary | 3–4 | | Cow Palace | 17–57–5 | 39 |
| 80 | April 16 | Winnipeg | 3–5 | | Cow Palace | 17–58–5 | 39 |

Legend: Win (2 points) Loss (0 points) Tie (1 point)

== Player statistics ==
=== Forwards ===
Note: GP= Games played; G= Goals; AST= Assists; PTS = Points; PIM = Points

| Player | GP | G | AST | PTS | PIM |
|---|---|---|---|---|---|
| Pat Falloon | 79 | 25 | 34 | 59 | 16 |
| Brian Mullen | 72 | 18 | 28 | 46 | 66 |
| David Bruce | 60 | 22 | 16 | 38 | 46 |
| Brian Lawton | 59 | 15 | 22 | 37 | 42 |
| Kelly Kisio | 48 | 11 | 26 | 37 | 54 |
| Dean Evason | 74 | 11 | 15 | 26 | 99 |
| Wayne Presley | 47 | 8 | 14 | 22 | 76 |
| Perry Berezan | 66 | 12 | 7 | 19 | 30 |
| Mike Sullivan | 64 | 8 | 11 | 19 | 15 |
| Steve Bozek | 58 | 8 | 8 | 16 | 27 |
| Dale Craigwell | 32 | 5 | 11 | 16 | 8 |
| Pat MacLeod | 37 | 5 | 11 | 16 | 4 |
| Paul Fenton | 60 | 11 | 4 | 15 | 33 |
| Ken Hammond | 46 | 5 | 10 | 15 | 82 |
| Perry Anderson | 48 | 4 | 8 | 12 | 143 |
| Tony Hrkac | 22 | 2 | 10 | 12 | 4 |
| Jeff Odgers | 61 | 7 | 4 | 11 | 217 |
| Johan Garpenlov | 12 | 5 | 6 | 11 | 4 |
| Don Barber | 12 | 1 | 3 | 4 | 2 |
| J. F. Quintin | 8 | 3 | 0 | 3 | 0 |
| Ray Whitney | 2 | 0 | 3 | 3 | 0 |
| Craig Coxe | 10 | 2 | 0 | 2 | 19 |
| Mike McHugh | 8 | 1 | 0 | 1 | 14 |
| Mark Pavelich | 2 | 0 | 1 | 1 | 4 |
| Kevin Evans | 5 | 0 | 1 | 1 | 25 |
| Dave Snuggerud | 11 | 0 | 1 | 1 | 4 |
| Mikhail Kravets | 1 | 0 | 0 | 0 | 0 |
| Peter Lappin | 1 | 0 | 0 | 0 | 0 |
| John Carter | 4 | 0 | 0 | 0 | 0 |
| Ed Courtenay | 4 | 0 | 0 | 0 | 0 |

=== Defensemen ===
Note: GP= Games played; G= Goals; AST= Assists; PTS = Points; PIM = Points

| Player | GP | G | AST | PTS | PIM |
|---|---|---|---|---|---|
| Doug Wilson | 44 | 9 | 19 | 28 | 26 |
| David Williams | 56 | 3 | 25 | 28 | 40 |
| Neil Wilkinson | 60 | 4 | 15 | 19 | 107 |
| Jay More | 46 | 4 | 13 | 17 | 85 |
| Link Gaetz | 48 | 6 | 6 | 12 | 326 |
| Rob Zettler | 74 | 1 | 8 | 9 | 99 |
| Bob McGill | 62 | 3 | 1 | 4 | 70 |
| Rick Lessard | 8 | 0 | 2 | 2 | 16 |
| Mike Colman | 15 | 0 | 1 | 1 | 32 |
| Claudio Scremin | 13 | 0 | 0 | 0 | 25 |

=== Goaltending ===
Note: GP= Games played; W= Wins; L= Losses; T = Ties; SO = Shutouts; GAA = Goals Against

| Player | GP | MIN | W | L | T | SO | GAA |
|---|---|---|---|---|---|---|---|
| Wade Flaherty | 3 | 645 | 0 | 3 | 0 | 0 | 4.38 |
| Jeff Hackett | 42 | 2314 | 11 | 27 | 1 | 0 | 3.84 |
| Brian Hayward | 7 | 305 | 1 | 4 | 0 | 0 | 4.92 |
| Arturs Irbe | 13 | 645 | 2 | 6 | 3 | 0 | 4.47 |
| Jarmo Myllys | 27 | 1374 | 3 | 18 | 1 | 0 | 5.02 |

== Transactions ==
=== Trades ===
| May 30, 1991 | To Quebec Nordiques Greg Paslawski | To San Jose Sharks Tony Hrkac |
| May 30, 1991 | To New York Rangers Tim Kerr | To San Jose Sharks Brian Mullen; Future Considerations |
| May 31, 1991 | To Minnesota North Stars Sharks agreed not to select Mike Craig in dispersal draft | To San Jose Sharks 2nd-round pick in 1991; 1st-round pick in 1992 |
| June 3, 1991 | To Minnesota North Stars Shane Churla | To San Jose Sharks Kelly Kisio |
| September 6, 1991 | To Chicago Blackhawks Kerry Toporowski; 2nd-round pick in 1992 | To San Jose Sharks Doug Wilson |
| September 20, 1991 | To Chicago Blackhawks 3rd-round pick in 1993 | To San Jose Sharks Wayne Presley |
| October 2, 1991 | To Hartford Whalers Dan Keczmer | To San Jose Sharks Dean Evason |
| October 18, 1991 | To Hartford Whalers Mike McHugh | To San Jose Sharks Paul Fenton |
| February 7, 1992 | To Chicago Blackhawks Tony Hrkac | To San Jose Sharks conditional pick in 1993 |
| March 7, 1992 | To Quebec Nordiques Murray Garbutt | To San Jose Sharks Don Barber |
| March 9, 1992 | To Vancouver Canucks Ken Hammond | To San Jose Sharks 8th-round pick in 1992 |
| March 9, 1992 | To Detroit Red Wings Bob McGill; 8th-round pick in 1992 | To San Jose Sharks Johan Garpenlov |
| March 9, 1992 | To Buffalo Sabres Wayne Presley | To San Jose Sharks Dave Snuggerud |

=== Free agency ===
| Date | Player | Previous team |
|---|---|---|
| July 8, 1991 | Perry Anderson | New Jersey Devils |
| August 9, 1991 | Steve Bozek | Vancouver Canucks |
| August 9, 1991 | Ken Hammond | Boston Bruins |
| August 9, 1991 | Brian Lawton | Phoenix Roadrunners (IHL) |
| August 9, 1991 | Mark Pavelich | |
| August 9, 1991 | Mike Sullivan | San Diego Gulls (IHL) |
| August 9, 1991 | David Williams | Knoxville Cherokees (ECHL) |
| August 22, 1991 | John Carter | Boston Bruins |
| August 30, 1991 | Larry DePalma | Minnesota North Stars |
| September 3, 1991 | Mike Colman | Kansas City Blades (IHL) |
| September 3, 1991 | Wade Flaherty | Kansas City Blades (IHL) |
| September 3, 1991 | Jeff Odgers | Kansas City Blades (IHL) |
| September 3, 1991 | Claudio Scremin | Kansas City Blades (IHL) |
| October 10, 1991 | Perry Berezan | Minnesota North Stars |

| Date | Player | New team |
|---|---|---|
| October 8, 1991 | Mark Pavelich | |

== Draft picks ==
=== NHL entry draft ===
| Round | # | Player | Position | Nationality | College/Junior/Club team |
|---|---|---|---|---|---|
| 1 | 2 | Pat Falloon | Right wing | Canada | Spokane Chiefs (WHL) |
| 2 | 23 | Ray Whitney | Left wing | Canada | Spokane Chiefs (WHL) |
| 2 | 30 | Sandis Ozolinsh | Defense | Latvia | Dynamo Riga (Russia) |
| 3 | 45 | Dody Wood | Left wing | Canada | Seattle Thunderbirds (WHL) |
| 4 | 67 | Kerry Toporowski | Defense | Canada | Spokane Chiefs (WHL) |
| 5 | 89 | Dan Ryder | Goalie | Canada | Sudbury Wolves (OHL) |
| 6 | 111 | Fredrik Nilsson | Left wing | Sweden | Vasteras IK (SEL) |
| 7 | 133 | Jaroslav Otevrel | Left wing | Czechoslovakia | Zlin ZPS AC (Czech) |
| 8 | 155 | Dean Grillo | Center | United States | Waterloo Black Hawks (USHL) |
| 9 | 177 | Corwin Saurdiff | Goalie | United States | Waterloo Black Hawks (USHL) |
| 10 | 199 | Dale Craigwell | Center | Canada | Oshawa Generals (OHL) |
| 11 | 221 | Aaron Kriss | Defense | United States | UMass Lowell (NCAA) |
| 12 | 243 | Mikhail Kravets | Right wing | Soviet Union | Leningrad SKA (Russia) |

=== NHL supplemental draft ===
| Round | # | Player | Position | Nationality | College/Junior/Club team |
|---|---|---|---|---|---|
| 1 | 1 | Jeff McLean | Center | Canada | University of North Dakota (WCHA) |
| 1 | 7 | Mark Beaufait | Center | United States | Northern Michigan University (CCHA) |

=== Dispersal Draft results ===
The Sharks selected 24 players from the North Stars.

| # | Player |
|---|---|
| 1. | Shane Churla (RW) |
| 2. | Brian Hayward (G) |
| 3. | Neil Wilkinson (D) |
| 4. | Rob Zettler (D) |
| 5. | Ed Courtenay (RW) |
| 6. | Kevin Evans (LW) |
| 7. | Link Gaetz (D) |
| 8. | Dan Keczmer (D) |
| 9. | Dean Kolstad (D) |
| 10. | Peter Lappin (RW) |
| 11. | Pat MacLeod (D) |
| 12. | Mike McHugh (LW) |
| 13. | Jarmo Myllys (G) |
| 14. | J. F. Quintin (LW) |
| 15. | Scott Cashman (G) |
| 16. | Murray Garbutt (C) |
| 17. | Rob Gaudreau (RW) |
| 18. | Arturs Irbe (G) |
| 19. | Shaun Kane (D) |
| 20. | Larry Olimb (D) |
| 21. | Tom Pederson (D) |
| 22. | Bryan Schoen (G) |
| 23. | John Weisbrod (C) |
| 24. | Doug Zmolek (D) |

=== Expansion Draft results ===
| # | Player | Drafted From |
|---|---|---|
| 1. | Jeff Hackett (G) | New York Islanders |
| 3. | Jay More (D) | Montreal Canadiens |
| 5. | Rick Lessard (D) | Calgary Flames |
| 7. | Bob McGill (D) | Chicago Blackhawks |
| 9. | Tim Kerr (F) | Philadelphia Flyers |
| 11. | Jeff Madill (RW) | New Jersey Devils |
| 13. | David Bruce (LW) | St. Louis Blues |
| 15. | Greg Paslawski (RW) | Buffalo Sabres |
| 17. | Bengt Gustafsson (F) | Detroit Red Wings |
| 19. | Craig Coxe (C) | Vancouver Canucks |
