= 1991 NHL dispersal and expansion drafts =

Player selection draft

General information
- Date: May 30, 1991

Overview
- League: National Hockey League
- Expansion teams: San Jose Sharks
- Expansion season: 1991–92
- Merging teams: Minnesota North Stars

The 1991 NHL dispersal and expansion drafts were held via telephone conference call on May 30, 1991. The dispersal draft took place to fill the roster of the league's expansion team for the 1991–92 season, the San Jose Sharks, first from the Minnesota North Stars pool of players, and then from the rest of the NHL pool of players (to re-stock the North Stars' roster and to fill out the Sharks' roster).

== Background ==
In 1990, as a result of slipping attendance, George and Gordon Gund, the owners of the Minnesota North Stars, petitioned the NHL for permission to relocate their team to the San Francisco Bay Area. The NHL denied their request, with other owners wishing for the market to be used to draw a lucrative expansion fee. As a compromise, the league agreed to award the Gund brothers a new NHL expansion franchise to be located in the Bay Area, which would become the San Jose Sharks. The Gunds would sell the North Stars to an NHL-approved purchaser. One of the conditions of sale and expansion deal was that the Sharks would have the right to draft players from the North Stars organization. After that draft, the North Stars' roster would be replenished by the expansion draft as well.

The Gunds paid $50 million for the Sharks franchise. They sold the North Stars to a consortium consisting of Howard Baldwin, Morris Belzberg, and Norman Green for $31.5 million. A series of disputes led to the team being completely controlled by Green, who eventually moved the team to Dallas after the 1992–93 season.

George and Gordon Gund had previously owned the California Golden Seals/Cleveland Barons franchise, before merging that team with (and ultimately assuming ownership of) the North Stars in 1978. By spinning off the Sharks from the North Stars, it effectively undid the 13-year merger between the two franchises.

== Rules ==
Dispersal draft: before the draft, the North Stars protected 14 skaters and two goaltenders who had played at least 50 NHL games by the end of the 1989–90 season. From the unprotected North Stars players (but excluding 1990 draft picks), the Sharks selected 14 skaters and two goaltenders. Up to three Shark selections could have been unsigned North Stars draft choices, while another three could have been players signed between May 2 and June 15, 1990.

After San Jose had chosen 14 skaters and two goaltenders from Minnesota, the teams would take turns choosing from the pool of unclaimed players until the Sharks roster reached thirty players.

Expansion draft: the other 20 teams in the league were allowed to protect two goaltenders and 16 skaters. The Sharks and North Stars would take turns selecting from the pool of unprotected players until each had chosen ten players. 20 total players would be selected, one from each franchise.

== Dispersal draft results ==
The Sharks selected 24 players from the North Stars.

#	Player	1990–91 team	League
1.	Shane Churla (RW)	Minnesota North Stars	NHL
2.	Brian Hayward (G)	Minnesota North Stars	NHL
3.	Neil Wilkinson (D)	Minnesota North Stars	NHL
4.	Rob Zettler (D)	Minnesota North Stars	NHL
5.	Ed Courtenay (RW)	Kalamazoo Wings	IHL
6.	Kevin Evans (LW)	Kalamazoo Wings	IHL
7.	Link Gaetz (D)	Kalamazoo Wings	IHL
8.	Dan Keczmer (D)	Kalamazoo Wings	IHL
9.	Dean Kolstad (D)	Kalamazoo Wings	IHL
10.	Peter Lappin (RW)	Kalamazoo Wings	IHL
11.	Pat MacLeod (D)	Kalamazoo Wings	IHL
12.	Mike McHugh (LW)	Kalamazoo Wings	IHL
13.	Jarmo Myllys (G)	Kalamazoo Wings	IHL
14.	J. F. Quintin (LW)	Kalamazoo Wings	IHL
15.	Scott Cashman (G)	Boston University	Hockey East
16.	Murray Garbutt (C)	Spokane	WHL
17.	Rob Gaudreau (RW)	Providence College	Hockey East
18.	Arturs Irbe (G)	Dynamo Riga	Soviet
19.	Shaun Kane (D)	Providence College	Hockey East
20.	Larry Olimb (D)	University of Minnesota	WCHA
21.	Tom Pederson (D)	University of Minnesota	WCHA
22.	Bryan Schoen (G)	University of Denver	WCHA
23.	John Weisbrod (C)	Harvard	ECAC
24.	Doug Zmolek (D)	University of Minnesota	WCHA

== Expansion draft results ==
#	Player	Drafted from	Drafted by
1.	Jeff Hackett (G)	New York Islanders	San Jose Sharks
2.	Rob Ramage (D)	Toronto Maple Leafs	Minnesota North Stars
3.	Jayson More (D)	Montreal Canadiens	San Jose Sharks
4.	Dave Babych (D)	Hartford Whalers	Minnesota North Stars
5.	Rick Lessard (D)	Calgary Flames	San Jose Sharks
6.	Allen Pedersen (D)	Boston Bruins	Minnesota North Stars
7.	Bob McGill (D)	Chicago Blackhawks	San Jose Sharks
8.	Charlie Huddy (D)	Edmonton Oilers	Minnesota North Stars
9.	Tim Kerr (F)	Philadelphia Flyers	San Jose Sharks
10.	Kelly Kisio (F)	New York Rangers	Minnesota North Stars
11.	Jeff Madill (RW)	New Jersey Devils	San Jose Sharks
12.	Randy Gilhen (C)	Pittsburgh Penguins	Minnesota North Stars
13.	David Bruce (LW)	St. Louis Blues	San Jose Sharks
14.	Rob Murray (C)	Washington Capitals	Minnesota North Stars
15.	Greg Paslawski (RW)	Buffalo Sabres	San Jose Sharks
16.	Tyler Larter (F)	Winnipeg Jets	Minnesota North Stars
17.	Bengt-Ake Gustafsson (F)	Detroit Red Wings	San Jose Sharks
18.	Jim Thomson (RW)	Los Angeles Kings	Minnesota North Stars
19.	Craig Coxe (C)	Vancouver Canucks	San Jose Sharks
20.	Guy Lafleur (RW)	Quebec Nordiques	Minnesota North Stars

== Post-draft ==
Not all of the players selected by the Sharks and North Stars in these drafts stayed with their new teams for long. Among players moved before the start of the 1991–92 season were the following:

- Tim Kerr, selected by San Jose in the expansion draft, was traded to the New York Rangers for Brian Mullen and future considerations on May 30, 1991,
- Rob Murray, selected by Minnesota in the expansion draft, was traded to Winnipeg for a seventh-round pick in the 1991 NHL entry draft on May 31, 1991,
- Greg Paslawski, selected by San Jose in the expansion draft, was traded to Quebec for Tony Hrkac on May 31, 1991,
- Shane Churla, selected by San Jose in the dispersal draft, was traded back to Minnesota for Kelly Kisio, whom the North Stars had selected in the expansion draft, on June 3, 1991,
- Dave Babych, selected by Minnesota in the expansion draft, was traded to Vancouver for Tom Kurvers on June 22, 1991,
- Charlie Huddy, Randy Gilhen and Jim Thomson, all drafted by Minnesota in the expansion draft, were traded along with a fourth-round pick in the 1991 NHL entry draft to Los Angeles for Todd Elik on June 22, 1991,
- Dan Keczmer, selected by San Jose in the dispersal draft, was traded to Hartford for Dean Evason on October 2, 1991,
- Guy Lafleur, selected by Minnesota in the expansion draft, was traded back to Quebec for Alan Haworth; Lafleur retired before the 1991–92 season began.

The majority of the players selected did not have lengthy NHL careers; many of them ended up in the minor leagues. San Jose's original minor league affiliate was the Kansas City Blades of the International Hockey League. The Blades won the IHL Championship, the Turner Cup, in 1992, and a majority of their players were under contract to San Jose. In fact, many of those players were under contract with the North Stars the previous year and played for a rival IHL team, the Kalamazoo Wings.

== See also ==
- 1991 NHL entry draft
- 1991 NHL supplemental draft
- 1991–92 NHL season
