= 1991–92 Winnipeg Jets season =

NHL hockey team season

1991–92 Winnipeg Jets
- Division: 4th Smythe
- Conference: 7th Campbell
- 1991–92 record: 33–32–15
- Home record: 20–14–6
- Road record: 13–18–9
- Goals for: 251
- Goals against: 244

Team information
- General manager: Mike Smith
- Coach: John Paddock
- Captain: Troy Murray
- Alternate captains: Thomas Steen; Randy Carlyle
- Arena: Winnipeg Arena

Team leaders
- Goals: Eddie Olczyk (32)
- Assists: Phil Housley (63)
- Points: Phil Housley (86)
- Penalty minutes: Shawn Cronin (271)
- Plus/minus: Teppo Numminen (+15)
- Wins: Bob Essensa (21)
- Goals against average: Bob Essensa (2.88)

The 1991–92 Winnipeg Jets season was the Jets' 20th season, their 13th in the National Hockey League (NHL). The Jets placed fourth in the Smythe Division and qualified for the 1992 Stanley Cup playoffs, where they lost the Division Semi-final to the Vancouver Canucks, four games to three.

== Offseason ==
On June 17, 1991, the Jets introduced John Paddock as the new head coach of the team, as Bob Murdoch was not brought back after Winnipeg failed to qualify for the 1991 Stanley Cup playoffs. This would be Paddock's first head coaching job in the NHL, although he had six years of head coaching experience in the American Hockey League (AHL) and had led the Hershey Bears to the 1988 Calder Cup. Paddock was the head coach of the Binghamton Rangers in the 1990–91 season, leading the team to a 44–30–6 record.

With the fifth overall pick at the 1991 NHL entry draft held on June 22, 1991, the Jets selected defenceman Aaron Ward from the University of Michigan. In 46 games, Ward had 8 goals and 19 points. Some other notable picks that Winnipeg made were Juha Ylonen in the fifth round and Igor Ulanov in the tenth round.

On July 22, 1991, the Jets acquired Troy Murray and Warren Rychel from the Chicago Blackhawks in exchange for Bryan Marchment and Chris Norton. Murray was coming off a 14-goal, 37-point season in 75 games with the Blackhawks in 1990–91, and would be named the captain of the Jets for 1991–92. Rychel spent the 1990–91 season with the Indianapolis Ice of the AHL, recording 33 goals and 63 points in 68 games, as well as 338 penalty minutes.

The Smythe Division added a sixth team for the 1991–92 season, as the expansion team San Jose Sharks joined the division.

Troy Murray was named captain, replacing Randy Carlyle and Thomas Steen.

== Regular season ==
The Jets finished the regular season third in goaltending, allowing only 244 goals. They also tied the Montreal Canadiens for the most shutouts, with 7.

=== Final standings ===
Smythe Division
	GP	W	L	T	GF	GA	Pts
**Vancouver Canucks**	**80**	**42**	**26**	**12**	**285**	**250**	**96**
**Los Angeles Kings**	**80**	**35**	**31**	**14**	**287**	**250**	**84**
**Edmonton Oilers**	**80**	**36**	**34**	**10**	**295**	**297**	**82**
**Winnipeg Jets**	**80**	**33**	**32**	**15**	**251**	**244**	**81**
Calgary Flames	80	31	37	12	296	305	74
San Jose Sharks	80	17	58	5	219	359	39

Campbell Conference
R		Div	GP	W	L	T	GF	GA	Pts
1	**Detroit Red Wings**	**NRS**	**80**	**43**	**25**	**12**	**320**	**256**	**98**
2	**Vancouver Canucks**	**SMY**	**80**	**42**	**26**	**12**	**285**	**250**	**96**
3	**Chicago Blackhawks**	**NRS**	**80**	**36**	**29**	**15**	**257**	**236**	**87**
4	**Los Angeles Kings**	**SMY**	**80**	**35**	**31**	**14**	**287**	**296**	**84**
5	**St. Louis Blues**	**NRS**	**80**	**36**	**33**	**11**	**279**	**266**	**83**
6	**Edmonton Oilers**	**SMY**	**80**	**36**	**34**	**10**	**295**	**297**	**82**
7	**Winnipeg Jets**	**SMY**	**80**	**33**	**32**	**15**	**251**	**244**	**81**
8	Calgary Flames	SMY	80	31	37	12	296	305	74
9	**Minnesota North Stars**	**NRS**	**80**	**32**	**42**	**6**	**246**	**278**	**70**
10	Toronto Maple Leafs	NRS	80	30	43	7	234	294	67
11	San Jose Sharks	SMY	80	17	58	5	219	359	39

Divisions: NRS – Norris, SMY – Smythe
bold – Qualified for playoffs

== Schedule and results ==
1991–92 regular season
October

Game	Result	Date	Score	Opponent	Record
1	L	October 4, 1991	3–6	Los Angeles Kings (1991–92)	0–1–0
2	W	October 6, 1991	5–3	Calgary Flames (1991–92)	1–1–0
3	L	October 8, 1991	2–3 OT	Vancouver Canucks (1991–92)	1–2–0
4	W	October 10, 1991	5–4	@ San Jose Sharks (1991–92)	2–2–0
5	T	October 12, 1991	3–3 OT	@ Los Angeles Kings (1991–92)	2–2–1
6	L	October 16, 1991	2–3	Hartford Whalers (1991–92)	2–3–1
7	W	October 19, 1991	4–2	Toronto Maple Leafs (1991–92)	3–3–1
8	T	October 22, 1991	1–1 OT	@ New York Islanders (1991–92)	3–3–2
9	W	October 23, 1991	3–2	@ Detroit Red Wings (1991–92)	4–3–2
10	W	October 25, 1991	2–0	Philadelphia Flyers (1991–92)	5–3–2
11	W	October 27, 1991	6–5	Washington Capitals (1991–92)	6–3–2
12	L	October 29, 1991	2–7	@ Quebec Nordiques (1991–92)	6–4–2
13	L	October 30, 1991	1–6	@ Montreal Canadiens (1991–92)	6–5–2

November

Game	Result	Date	Score	Opponent	Record
14	L	November 1, 1991	6–7 OT	Calgary Flames (1991–92)	6–6–2
15	T	November 3, 1991	3–3 OT	St. Louis Blues (1991–92)	6–6–3
16	T	November 5, 1991	2–2 OT	@ Vancouver Canucks (1991–92)	6–6–4
17	L	November 8, 1991	1–3	Pittsburgh Penguins (1991–92)	6–7–4
18	W	November 11, 1991	6–2	Los Angeles Kings (1991–92)	7–7–4
19	L	November 14, 1991	1–2 OT	@ St. Louis Blues (1991–92)	7–8–4
20	W	November 16, 1991	1–0	@ New Jersey Devils (1991–92)	8–8–4
21	W	November 17, 1991	2–1	@ Philadelphia Flyers (1991–92)	9–8–4
22	W	November 20, 1991	3–1	New York Islanders (1991–92)	10–8–4
23	W	November 23, 1991	4–0	@ Edmonton Oilers (1991–92)	11–8–4
24	T	November 25, 1991	3–3 OT	@ Calgary Flames (1991–92)	11–8–5
25	W	November 27, 1991	3–2	New York Rangers (1991–92)	12–8–5

December

Game	Result	Date	Score	Opponent	Record
26	W	December 1, 1991	3–2 OT	Chicago Blackhawks (1991–92)	13–8–5
27	W	December 4, 1991	5–4	Buffalo Sabres (1991–92)	14–8–5
28	T	December 6, 1991	4–4 OT	Edmonton Oilers (1991–92)	14–8–6
29	W	December 8, 1991	4–3	Washington Capitals (1991–92)	15–8–6
30	T	December 10, 1991	3–3 OT	@ San Jose Sharks (1991–92)	15–8–7
31	L	December 12, 1991	1–2	@ Los Angeles Kings (1991–92)	15–9–7
32	L	December 14, 1991	5–7	@ Edmonton Oilers (1991–92)	15–10–7
33	L	December 17, 1991	4–7	@ Calgary Flames (1991–92)	15–11–7
34	L	December 19, 1991	1–3	@ Vancouver Canucks (1991–92)	15–12–7
35	W	December 21, 1991	7–2	Calgary Flames (1991–92)	16–12–7
36	L	December 23, 1991	1–3	@ Toronto Maple Leafs (1991–92)	16–13–7
37	L	December 26, 1991	2–3	Minnesota North Stars (1991–92)	16–14–7
38	T	December 27, 1991	3–3 OT	@ Chicago Blackhawks (1991–92)	16–14–8
39	L	December 29, 1991	3–6	Boston Bruins (1991–92)	16–15–8
40	L	December 31, 1991	2–5	New York Rangers (1991–92)	16–16–8

January

Game	Result	Date	Score	Opponent	Record
41	W	January 2, 1992	3–1	@ Boston Bruins (1991–92)	17–16–8
42	L	January 4, 1992	2–3	@ Pittsburgh Penguins (1991–92)	17–17–8
43	L	January 6, 1992	2–4	@ New York Rangers (1991–92)	17–18–8
44	W	January 8, 1992	5–2	Edmonton Oilers (1991–92)	18–18–8
45	W	January 10, 1992	6–2	Chicago Blackhawks (1991–92)	19–18–8
46	L	January 12, 1992	3–4	San Jose Sharks (1991–92)	19–19–8
47	L	January 14, 1992	2–4	Vancouver Canucks (1991–92)	19–20–8
48	T	January 21, 1992	3–3 OT	@ Hartford Whalers (1991–92)	19–20–9
49	W	January 23, 1992	1–0	@ Philadelphia Flyers (1991–92)	20–20–9
50	L	January 25, 1992	1–2	@ Quebec Nordiques (1991–92)	20–21–9
51	L	January 26, 1992	2–5	@ Buffalo Sabres (1991–92)	20–22–9
52	W	January 28, 1992	4–0	@ Pittsburgh Penguins (1991–92)	21–22–9
53	T	January 31, 1992	4–4 OT	Quebec Nordiques (1991–92)	21–22–10

February

Game	Result	Date	Score	Opponent	Record
54	W	February 2, 1992	6–0	San Jose Sharks (1991–92)	22–22–10
55	T	February 4, 1992	3–3 OT	Boston Bruins (1991–92)	22–22–11
56	W	February 7, 1992	4–1	Calgary Flames (1991–92)	23–22–11
57	L	February 13, 1992	1–6	@ Minnesota North Stars (1991–92)	23–23–11
58	W	February 15, 1992	3–1	@ Toronto Maple Leafs (1991–92)	24–23–11
59	L	February 17, 1992	4–5 OT	@ New York Islanders (1991–92)	24–24–11
60	L	February 19, 1992	3–4	St. Louis Blues (1991–92)	24–25–11
61	W	February 21, 1992	6–4	New Jersey Devils (1991–92)	25–25–11
62	L	February 23, 1992	2–4	Los Angeles Kings (1991–92)	25–26–11
63	L	February 26, 1992	1–6	@ Edmonton Oilers (1991–92)	25–27–11
64	L	February 28, 1992	3–5	@ Vancouver Canucks (1991–92)	25–28–11

March

Game	Result	Date	Score	Opponent	Record
65	L	March 1, 1992	2–4	Edmonton Oilers (1991–92)	25–29–11
66	W	March 3, 1992	4–3	@ Detroit Red Wings (1991–92)	26–29–11
67	T	March 6, 1992	3–3 OT	@ Washington Capitals (1991–92)	26–29–12
68	L	March 8, 1992	2–4	@ Minnesota North Stars (1991–92)	26–30–12
69	W	March 11, 1992	3–0	San Jose Sharks (1991–92)	27–30–12
70	L	March 13, 1992	0–1	Hartford Whalers (1991–92)	27–31–12
71	T	March 15, 1992	1–1 OT	Detroit Red Wings (1991–92)	27–31–13
72	L	March 17, 1992	4–5	@ Los Angeles Kings (1991–92)	27–32–13
73	T	March 20, 1992	2–2 OT	@ Vancouver Canucks (1991–92)	27–32–14
74	W	March 22, 1992	5–1	Vancouver Canucks (1991–92)	28–32–14
75	T	March 25, 1992	2–2 OT	Montreal Canadiens (1991–92)	28–32–15
76	W	March 27, 1992	6–4	Los Angeles Kings (1991–92)	29–32–15
77	W	March 29, 1992	6–5	San Jose Sharks (1991–92)	30–32–15

April

Game	Result	Date	Score	Opponent	Record
78	W	April 12, 1992	4–3	@ Calgary Flames (1991–92)	31–32–15
79	W	April 14, 1992	6–2	@ Edmonton Oilers (1991–92)	32–32–15
80	W	April 16, 1992	5–3	@ San Jose Sharks (1991–92)	33–32–15

Legend: Win (2 points) Loss (0 points) Tie (1 point)

== Playoffs ==
The Jets lost to the Vancouver Canucks in seven games, in the Division semi-finals.

== Player statistics ==
=== Regular season ===
Scoring

Player	Pos	GP	G	A	Pts	PIM	+/-	PPG	SHG	GWG
Phil Housley	D	74	23	63	86	92	-5	11	0	4
Eddie Olczyk	C	64	32	33	65	67	11	12	0	7
Fredrik Olausson	D	77	20	42	62	34	-31	13	1	2
Pat Elynuik	RW	60	25	25	50	65	-2	9	0	1
Troy Murray	C	74	17	30	47	69	-13	5	2	1
Darrin Shannon	LW	68	13	26	39	41	5	3	0	3
Teppo Numminen	D	80	5	34	39	32	15	4	0	1
Thomas Steen	C	38	13	25	38	29	5	10	0	0
Luciano Borsato	C	56	15	21	36	45	-6	5	0	1
Paul MacDermid	RW	59	10	11	21	151	-8	2	0	2
Stu Barnes	C	46	8	9	17	26	-2	4	0	0
Mike Eagles	C/LW	65	7	10	17	118	-17	0	1	0
Mark Osborne	LW	43	4	12	16	65	-8	0	0	0
Doug Evans	LW	30	7	7	14	68	2	1	0	0
Danton Cole	C/RW	52	7	5	12	32	-15	1	2	0
Igor Ulanov	D	27	2	9	11	67	5	0	0	0
Randy Carlyle	D	66	1	9	10	54	4	0	0	0
Aaron Broten	LW/C	25	4	5	9	14	2	0	0	3
Mike Hartman	LW	75	4	4	8	264	-10	0	0	1
Russell Romaniuk	LW	27	3	5	8	18	2	2	0	1
Keith Tkachuk	LW	17	3	5	8	28	0	2	0	0
John LeBlanc	RW	16	6	1	7	6	-6	5	0	1
Evgeny Davydov	LW	12	4	3	7	8	7	2	0	0
Phil Sykes	LW	52	4	2	6	72	-12	0	0	2
Bryan Erickson	RW	10	2	4	6	0	9	0	0	1
Dean Kennedy	D	18	2	4	6	21	2	0	0	1
Mike Lalor	D	15	2	3	5	14	11	0	0	0
Petri Skriko	RW	15	2	3	5	4	-1	0	0	0
Mario Marois	D	34	1	3	4	34	-8	0	1	0
Shawn Cronin	D	65	0	4	4	271	-11	0	0	0
Moe Mantha	D	12	0	4	4	6	0	0	0	0
Lucien DeBlois	C	11	1	2	3	2	1	0	0	1
Don Barber	W	11	0	3	3	4	2	0	0	0
Kris Draper	C	10	2	0	2	2	0	0	0	0
Dave McLlwain	C/RW	3	1	1	2	2	1	0	0	0
Bob Essensa	G	47	0	2	2	2	0	0	0	0
Brent Ashton	LW	7	1	0	1	4	-3	0	0	0
Rob Murray	C	9	0	1	1	18	-2	0	0	0
Rick Tabaracci	G	18	0	1	1	4	0	0	0	0
Stephane Beauregard	G	26	0	0	0	0	0	0	0	0
Jason Cirone	C	3	0	0	0	2	0	0	0	0
Gord Donnelly	D	4	0	0	0	11	-5	0	0	0
Bob Joyce	LW	1	0	0	0	0	0	0	0	0
Mike O'Neill	G	1	0	0	0	0	0	0	0	0
Kent Paynter	D	5	0	0	0	4	-1	0	0	0
Rudy Poeschek	RW/D	4	0	0	0	17	-5	0	0	0

Goaltending

Player	MIN	GP	W	L	T	GA	GAA	SO	SA	SV	SV%
Bob Essensa	2627	47	21	17	6	126	2.88	5	1407	1281	.910
Stephane Beauregard	1267	26	6	8	6	61	2.89	2	611	550	.900
Rick Tabaracci	966	18	6	7	3	52	3.23	0	470	418	.889
Mike O'Neill	13	1	0	0	0	1	4.62	0	7	6	.857
Team:	4873	80	33	32	15	240	2.96	7	2495	2255	.904

=== Playoffs ===
Scoring

Player	Pos	GP	G	A	Pts	PIM	PPG	SHG	GWG
Thomas Steen	C	7	2	4	6	2	2	0	0
Fredrik Olausson	D	7	1	5	6	4	1	0	0
Phil Housley	D	7	1	4	5	0	1	0	1
Aaron Broten	LW/C	7	2	2	4	12	0	0	0
Evgeny Davydov	LW	7	2	2	4	2	1	0	0
Pat Elynuik	RW	7	2	2	4	4	2	0	0
Keith Tkachuk	LW	7	3	0	3	30	0	0	0
Eddie Olczyk	C	6	2	1	3	4	0	0	1
Randy Carlyle	D	5	1	0	1	6	0	0	0
Lucien DeBlois	C	5	1	0	1	2	0	0	1
Darrin Shannon	LW	7	0	1	1	10	0	0	0
Phil Sykes	LW	7	0	1	1	9	0	0	0
Luciano Borsato	C	1	0	0	0	0	0	0	0
Shawn Cronin	D	4	0	0	0	6	0	0	0
Kris Draper	C	2	0	0	0	0	0	0	0
Mike Eagles	C/LW	7	0	0	0	8	0	0	0
Bob Essensa	G	1	0	0	0	0	0	0	0
Doug Evans	LW	1	0	0	0	2	0	0	0
Mike Hartman	LW	2	0	0	0	2	0	0	0
Dean Kennedy	D	2	0	0	0	0	0	0	0
Mike Lalor	D	7	0	0	0	19	0	0	0
Troy Murray	C	7	0	0	0	2	0	0	0
Teppo Numminen	D	7	0	0	0	0	0	0	0
Rick Tabaracci	G	7	0	0	0	0	0	0	0
Igor Ulanov	D	7	0	0	0	39	0	0	0

Goaltending

Player	MIN	GP	W	L	GA	GAA	SO	SA	SV	SV%
Rick Tabaracci	387	7	3	4	26	4.03	0	212	186	.877
Bob Essensa	33	1	0	0	3	5.45	0	17	14	.824
Team:	420	7	3	4	29	4.14	0	229	200	.873

Note:

Pos = Position;GP = Games played; G = Goals; A = Assists; Pts = Points; PIM = Penalty minutes; +/- = Plus/minus; PPG = Power-play goals; SHG = Short-handed goals; GWG = Game-winning goals
Pos = Position;GP = Games played; Min, TOI = Minutes played; W = Wins; L = Losses; T,T/OT = Ties; OTL = Overtime losses; GA = Goals-against; GAA = Goals-against average; SO = Shutouts; SA = Shots against; SV = Shots saved;SV% = Save percentage;

== Transactions ==
=== Trades ===
July 22, 1991	To Chicago Blackhawks Bryan Marchment; Jeff Norton	To Winnipeg Jets Troy Murray; Warren Rychel
October 11, 1991	To Buffalo Sabres Dave McLlwain; Gord Donnelly; 5th round pick in 1992 (Yuri Khmylev); Future Considerations	To Winnipeg Jets Darrin Shannon; Dean Kennedy; Mike Hartman
October 15, 1991	To Minnesota North Stars Tony Joseph	To Winnipeg Jets Tyler Larter
October 22, 1991	To Quebec Nordiques Sergei Kharin	To Winnipeg Jets Shawn Anderson
October 23, 1991	To Washington Capitals Shawn Anderson	To Winnipeg Jets Future Considerations
October 29, 1991	To Boston Bruins Brent Ashton	To Winnipeg Jets Petri Skriko
November 22, 1991	To Boston Bruins Scott Arniel	To Winnipeg Jets Future Considerations
November 26, 1991	To St. Louis Blues 8th round pick in 1992 (Igor Boldin)	To Winnipeg Jets Mario Marois
December 30, 1991	To Minnesota North Stars Warren Rychel	To Winnipeg Jets Tony Joseph; Future Considerations
February 27, 1992	To Philadelphia Flyers Moe Mantha	To Winnipeg Jets Future Considerations
March 2, 1992	To Washington Capitals Paul MacDermid	To Winnipeg Jets Mike Lalor
March 10, 1992	To Toronto Maple Leafs Mark Osborne	To Winnipeg Jets Lucien DeBlois
June 10, 1992	To Boston Bruins Doug Evans	To Winnipeg Jets Daniel Berthiaume
June 15, 1992	To Buffalo Sabres Stephane Beauregard	To Winnipeg Jets Christian Ruuttu; Future Considerations
June 19, 1992	To Tampa Bay Lightning Danton Cole	To Winnipeg Jets Future Considerations
June 20, 1992	To St. Louis Blues 11th round pick in 1993 (Christer Olsson)	To Winnipeg Jets 11th round pick in 1992 (Ivan Vologjaninov)
June 20, 1992	To Chicago Blackhawks 1st round pick in 1992 (Sergei Krivokrasov); 2nd round pick in 1992 (Jeff Shantz)	To Winnipeg Jets 1st round pick in 1992 (Sergei Bautin); 2nd round pick in 1992 (Boris Mironov)

=== Waivers ===
November 12, 1991	To Quebec Nordiques Don Barber

=== Free agents ===
Player	Former team
Anatoli Fedotov	Undrafted Free Agent
Rob Cowie	Undrafted Free Agent
Aaron Broten	Toronto Maple Leafs

Player	Former team
Matt Hervey	Boston Bruins

== Draft picks ==
Winnipeg's draft picks at the 1991 NHL entry draft held at the Buffalo Memorial Auditorium in Buffalo, New York.

Round	#	Player	Nationality	College/Junior/Club team (League)
1	5	Aaron Ward	Canada	University of Michigan (CCHA)
3	49	Dmitri Filimonov	Soviet Union	Dynamo Moscow (Soviet Union)
4	91	Juha Ylonen	Finland	Kiekko-Espoo (Finland)
5	99	Yan Kaminsky	Soviet Union	Dynamo Moscow (Soviet Union)
6	115	Jeff Sebastian	Canada	Seattle Thunderbirds (WHL)
8	159	Jeff Ricciardi	Canada	Ottawa 67's (OHL)
9	181	Sean Gauthier	Canada	Kingston Frontenacs (OHL)
10	203	Igor Ulanov	Soviet Union	Khimik Voskresensk (Soviet Union)
11	225	Jason Jennings	Canada	Western Michigan University (CCHA)
12	247	Sergei Sorokin	Soviet Union	Dynamo Moscow (Soviet Union)
S	5	Brad Mullahy	United States	Providence College (Hockey East)
S	11	Jeff Jestadt	United States	Ferris State University (CCHA)

== See also ==
- 1991–92 NHL season
