= 1991–92 Vancouver Canucks season =

22nd season in franchise history

1991–92 Vancouver Canucks
- Smythe Division champions
- Division: 1st Smythe
- Conference: 2nd Campbell
- 1991–92 record: 42–26–12
- Home record: 23–10–7
- Road record: 19–16–5
- Goals for: 285
- Goals against: 250

Team information
- General manager: Pat Quinn
- Coach: Pat Quinn
- Captain: Trevor Linden
- Alternate captains: Doug Lidster; Ryan Walter
- Arena: Pacific Coliseum
- Average attendance: 15,768

Team leaders
- Goals: Pavel Bure (34)
- Assists: Cliff Ronning (47)
- Points: Trevor Linden (75)
- Penalty minutes: Gino Odjick (348)
- Plus/minus: Jyrki Lumme (+25)
- Wins: Kirk McLean (38)
- Goals against average: Kirk McLean (2.74)

The 1991–92 Vancouver Canucks season was the Canucks' 22nd NHL season.

== Off-season ==
In the off-season, the Canucks fourth round draft pick in 1989 was finally validated and the Canucks now officially held the NHL rights to Pavel Bure. There was still a problem, though. His release from the Central Red Army still needed to be negotiated and there was no guarantee that he would play for the Canucks in the upcoming season. Director of Hockey Operations Brian Burke accepted the job as general manager of the Hartford Whalers and took Milwaukee Admirals Head Coach, Rick Ley to coach his team. George McPhee filled the vacant front-office post and Jack McIlhargey became the new coach on the farm. Ron Wilson became an assistant coach, as did Stan Smyl, who tearfully resigned from active playing. "The Steamer" retired as the team's all-time leader in games (896), goals (262), assists (411), and points (673). Pat Quinn elected to retain all three titles (President, General Manager, and Head Coach) instead of hiring a new coach. Craig Coxe was chosen by the San Jose Sharks in the expansion draft, and Steve Bozek signed with the same club as a free agent. To fill the void, 13-year veteran and Burnaby-native C Ryan Walter was signed away from Montreal.

Forward Trevor Linden is named sole team captain. Defenceman Doug Lidster (who shared the captaincy last season with Linden) is returned to his previous role of an alternate captain. Newly signed forward Ryan Walter, is named the other alternate captain.

== Regular season ==
The team season opened with a home-and-home series against the expansion San Jose Sharks and the Canucks swept. Pavel Bure, staying in California with his father and brother, watched the game at the Cow Palace from the press box. They managed to roll up a 7–1–1 record, the last being a 3–1 victory over the Washington Capitals on October 24 which leap-frogged the Canucks past Washington into first place in the NHL standings. On November 3, the Canucks paid tribute to their long-time captain and all-time leading scorer turned assistant coach (Smyl) with a special pre-game ceremony. He was presented with a Harley Davidson motorcycle, among other gifts, and had his number 12 raised to the rafters at Pacific Coliseum. In the game to follow, Igor Larionov broke out of a long drought by scoring his first three goals of the season in a 7–2 rout of Edmonton. The Pavel Bure debacle was being settled during that time and two nights later he made his NHL debut before a packed Coliseum against the Winnipeg Jets. The "Russian Rocket", as he became known, dazzled the crowd with three spectacular rushes but failed to score in a 3–3 tie. Three games later, Bure scored his first two NHL goals in an 8–2 romp of the Los Angeles Kings. Playing with Larionov and Greg Adams, Bure completed the "BIG Line", which became, arguably, the most dangerous offensive unit in Canucks history. Though all of the experts were predicting otherwise, the Canucks remained among the NHL's elite throughout the season, hitting a high point with an 11–0 shellacking of the Calgary Flames on March 1. Bure rolled to 34 goals, many of the highlight-reel variety, breaking Ivan Hlinka's club rookie record in only 65 games. His 60 points equaled Hlinka's total from 1981 to 1982. Trevor Linden's 75 points led the team in scoring for the second straight year, Cliff Ronning was second with 71 points and Larionov finished third with 65. Kirk McLean rebounded to have a terrific season in goal, winning a club-record 38 games and recording a 2.74 goals-against average with five shutouts earning him team MVP honors. Gino Odjick broke Dave Williams' 11-year-old single-season penalty minutes record with 348 and, what's more, he did it in only 65 games. Overall, the team racked up club record totals of 42 wins and 96 points and won the Smythe Division by 12 points over Los Angeles. The only threat to their division crown was a 10-day strike in early April that threatened to wipe out the playoffs. Finally, the streak of losing seasons had been halted at 16 years and, for the first time since 1982, the Canucks would open up a playoff series at home.

=== Standings ===
Smythe Division
	GP	W	L	T	GF	GA	Pts
**Vancouver Canucks**	**80**	**42**	**26**	**12**	**285**	**250**	**96**
**Los Angeles Kings**	**80**	**35**	**31**	**14**	**287**	**250**	**84**
**Edmonton Oilers**	**80**	**36**	**34**	**10**	**295**	**297**	**82**
**Winnipeg Jets**	**80**	**33**	**32**	**15**	**251**	**244**	**81**
Calgary Flames	80	31	37	12	296	305	74
San Jose Sharks	80	17	58	5	219	359	39

Campbell Conference
R		Div	GP	W	L	T	GF	GA	Pts
1	**Detroit Red Wings**	**NRS**	**80**	**43**	**25**	**12**	**320**	**256**	**98**
2	**Vancouver Canucks**	**SMY**	**80**	**42**	**26**	**12**	**285**	**250**	**96**
3	**Chicago Blackhawks**	**NRS**	**80**	**36**	**29**	**15**	**257**	**236**	**87**
4	**Los Angeles Kings**	**SMY**	**80**	**35**	**31**	**14**	**287**	**296**	**84**
5	**St. Louis Blues**	**NRS**	**80**	**36**	**33**	**11**	**279**	**266**	**83**
6	**Edmonton Oilers**	**SMY**	**80**	**36**	**34**	**10**	**295**	**297**	**82**
7	**Winnipeg Jets**	**SMY**	**80**	**33**	**32**	**15**	**251**	**244**	**81**
8	Calgary Flames	SMY	80	31	37	12	296	305	74
9	**Minnesota North Stars**	**NRS**	**80**	**32**	**42**	**6**	**246**	**278**	**70**
10	Toronto Maple Leafs	NRS	80	30	43	7	234	294	67
11	San Jose Sharks	SMY	80	17	58	5	219	359	39

Divisions: NRS – Norris, SMY – Smythe
bold – Qualified for playoffs

== Playoffs ==
The Canucks would eventually win the first round against the Winnipeg Jets, in seven games, after trailing the series 3–1 for the first playoff series victory since reaching the Stanley Cup Finals in 1982. However, the Canucks would not get past the Edmonton Oilers and lost the series in six games.

== Schedule and results ==
=== Regular season ===
1991–92 regular season
October: 9–3–1 (home: 5–1–1; road: 4–2–0)

Game	Date	Visitor	Score	Home	OT	Decision	Attendance	Record	Points
1	October 4	San Jose	3 – 4	Vancouver		McLean	16,123	1–0–0	2
2	October 5	Vancouver	5 – 2	San Jose		McLean	10,888	2–0–0	4
3	October 8	Vancouver	3 – 2	Winnipeg	OT	McLean	8,689	3–0–0	6
4	October 10	Vancouver	6 – 7	Chicago		Gamble	17,322	3–1–0	6
5	October 12	Vancouver	2 – 1	Toronto		McLean	15,759	4–1–0	8
6	October 13	Vancouver	3 – 1	Buffalo		McLean	14,403	5–1–0	10
7	October 17	Boston	3 – 3	Vancouver	OT	McLean	15,986	5–1–1	11
8	October 19	Calgary	2 – 5	Vancouver		McLean	15,226	6–1–1	13
9	October 21	Toronto	1 – 4	Vancouver		McLean	13,108	7–1–1	15
10	October 24	Washington	1 – 3	Vancouver		McLean	16,104	8–1–1	17
11	October 26	Vancouver	4 – 5	Edmonton		McLean	16,446	8–2–1	17
12	October 27	Edmonton	6 – 3	Vancouver		McLean	14,646	8–3–1	17
13	October 29	New Jersey	3 – 4	Vancouver		McLean	12,196	9–3–1	19

November: 7–4–2 (home: 6–2–1; road: 1–2–1)

Game	Date	Visitor	Score	Home	OT	Decision	Attendance	Record	Points
14	November 1	St. Louis	3 – 2	Vancouver		McLean	16,123	9–4–1	19
15	November 3	Edmonton	2 – 7	Vancouver		McLean	15,651	10–4–1	21
16	November 5	Winnipeg	2 – 2	Vancouver	OT	McLean	16,123	10–4–2	22
17	November 7	Vancouver	4 – 3	Los Angeles		McLean	16,005	11–4–2	24
18	November 10	NY Islanders	0 – 6	Vancouver		McLean	16,123	12–4–2	26
19	November 12	Los Angeles	2 – 8	Vancouver		McLean	16,123	13–4–2	28
20	November 14	Vancouver	2 – 2	Calgary	OT	McLean	19,688	13–4–3	29
21	November 16	San Jose	0 – 1	Vancouver		McLean	15,950	14–4–3	31
22	November 19	NY Rangers	4 – 3	Vancouver		McLean	16,077	14–5–3	31
23	November 21	Vancouver	2 – 3	Calgary		McLean	20,055	14–6–3	31
24	November 22	Calgary	5 – 6	Vancouver	OT	McLean	16,123	15–6–3	33
25	November 26	Vancouver	1 – 4	San Jose		Gamble	10,888	15–7–3	33
26	November 29	Chicago	2 – 5	Vancouver		McLean	16,123	16–7–3	35

December: 6–4–3 (home: 3–1–2; road: 3–3–1)

Game	Date	Visitor	Score	Home	OT	Decision	Attendance	Record	Points
27	December 1	Vancouver	0 – 7	Edmonton		McLean	15,502	16–8–3	35
28	December 3	Vancouver	0 – 3	Quebec		McLean	13,033	16–9–3	35
29	December 4	Vancouver	3 – 0	Montreal		McLean	16,573	17–9–3	37
30	December 7	Vancouver	3 – 6	Toronto		Gamble	15,781	17–10–3	37
31	December 10	Edmonton	7 – 4	Vancouver		McLean	14,974	17–11–3	37
32	December 12	Minnesota	5 – 7	Vancouver		Gamble	14,803	18–11–3	39
33	December 14	Vancouver	4 – 4	Los Angeles	OT	McLean	16,005	18–11–4	40
34	December 17	Detroit	1 – 2	Vancouver		McLean	15,609	19–11–4	42
35	December 19	Winnipeg	1 – 3	Vancouver		McLean	16,123	20–11–4	44
36	December 22	Quebec	6 – 6	Vancouver	OT	McLean	16,123	20–11–5	45
37	December 27	Philadelphia	1 – 1	Vancouver	OT	McLean	16,123	20–11–6	46
38	December 28	Vancouver	3 – 2	San Jose		McLean	10,888	21–11–6	48
39	December 31	Vancouver	5 – 3	Los Angeles		McLean	16,005	22–11–6	50

January: 7–3–1 (home: 2–2–0; road: 5–1–1)

Game	Date	Visitor	Score	Home	OT	Decision	Attendance	Record	Points
40	January 3	Vancouver	3 – 3	Washington	OT	McLean	16,789	22–11–7	51
41	January 4	Vancouver	3 – 4	Minnesota		Gamble	15,204	22–12–7	51
42	January 7	San Jose	1 – 4	Vancouver		McLean	15,816	23–12–7	53
43	January 12	Pittsburgh	4 – 3	Vancouver		McLean	16,123	23–13–7	53
44	January 14	Vancouver	4 – 2	Winnipeg		McLean	14,737	24–13–7	55
45	January 15	Vancouver	5 – 3	Edmonton		McLean	15,176	25–13–7	57
46	January 21	Vancouver	5 – 3	Quebec		Gamble	13,634	26–13–7	59
47	January 23	Vancouver	3 – 1	Detroit		McLean	19,816	27–13–7	61
48	January 25	Vancouver	1 – 0	St. Louis	OT	McLean	18,215	28–13–7	63
49	January 28	Edmonton	5 – 3	Vancouver		McLean	16,123	28–14–7	63
50	January 30	Chicago	1 – 4	Vancouver		McLean	16,123	29–14–7	65

February: 5–6–2 (home: 3–2–1; road: 2–4–1)

Game	Date	Visitor	Score	Home	OT	Decision	Attendance	Record	Points
51	February 1	Hartford	4 – 4	Vancouver	OT	McLean	16,123	29–14–8	66
52	February 4	Montreal	3 – 5	Vancouver		McLean	16,123	30–14–8	68
53	February 6	NY Islanders	5 – 4	Vancouver	OT	Gamble	15,689	30–15–8	68
54	February 10	Vancouver	3 – 8	Montreal		McLean	16,838	30–16–8	68
55	February 12	Vancouver	2 – 5	NY Rangers		McLean	16,002	30–17–8	68
56	February 13	Vancouver	3 – 5	New Jersey		Gamble	12,702	30–18–8	68
57	February 15	Vancouver	1 – 3	NY Islanders		McLean	9,911	30–19–8	68
58	February 17	Vancouver	3 – 3	NY Rangers	OT	McLean	18,200	30–19–9	69
59	February 19	Buffalo	5 – 6	Vancouver		McLean	16,123	31–19–9	71
60	February 21	Vancouver	5 – 3	San Jose		McLean	10,888	32–19–9	73
61	February 23	Boston	1 – 2	Vancouver	OT	McLean	16,123	33–19–9	75
62	February 25	Los Angeles	4 – 3	Vancouver		McLean	16,123	33–20–9	75
63	February 28	Winnipeg	3 – 5	Vancouver		McLean	16,123	34–20–9	77

March: 7–5–2 (home: 3–1–1; road: 4–4–1)

Game	Date	Visitor	Score	Home	OT	Decision	Attendance	Record	Points
64	March 1	Calgary	0 – 11	Vancouver		McLean		35–20–9	79
65	March 2	St. Louis	5 – 3	Vancouver		McLean		35–21–9	79
66	March 5	Vancouver	2 – 2	Boston	OT	Gamble		35–21–10	80
67	March 7	Vancouver	5 – 1	Hartford		Gamble		36–21–10	82
68	March 8	Vancouver	7 – 3	Philadelphia		McLean		37–21–10	84
69	March 12	New Jersey	1 – 2	Vancouver		McLean		38–21–10	86
70	March 14	Vancouver	6 – 4	Calgary		McLean		39–21–10	88
71	March 18	Hartford	1 – 3	Vancouver		Gamble		40–21–10	90
72	March 20	Winnipeg	2 – 2	Vancouver	OT	Gamble		40–21–11	91
73	March 22	Vancouver	1 – 5	Winnipeg		Gamble		40–22–11	91
74	March 24	Vancouver	4 – 2	Minnesota		McLean		41–22–11	93
75	March 26	Vancouver	3 – 7	Pittsburgh		Gamble		41–23–11	93
76	March 28	Vancouver	1 – 3	Detroit		McLean		41–24–11	93
77	March 29	Vancouver	4 – 7	Washington		McLean		41–25–11	93

April: 1–1–1 (home: 1–0–1; road: 1–0–0)

Game	Date	Visitor	Score	Home	OT	Decision	Attendance	Record	Points
78	April 12	Los Angeles	6 – 1	Vancouver		Gamble	16,123	41–26–11	93
79	April 14	Vancouver	3 – 2	Los Angeles		McLean	16,005	42–26–11	95
80	April 16	Calgary	4 – 4	Vancouver	OT	Gamble	15,843	42–26–12	96

Legend: Win (2 points) Loss (0 points) Tie (1 point)

=== Playoffs ===
1992 Stanley Cup playoffs
Smythe Division Semifinals vs. (S4) Winnipeg Jets – Canucks win 4–3

Game	Date	Visitor	Score	Home	OT	Decision	Attendance	Series
1	April 18	Winnipeg	3 – 2	Vancouver		McLean		0 – 1
2	April 20	Winnipeg	2 – 3	Vancouver		McLean		1 – 1
3	April 22	Vancouver	2 – 4	Winnipeg		McLean		1 – 2
4	April 24	Vancouver	1 – 3	Winnipeg		McLean		1 – 3
5	April 26	Winnipeg	2 – 8	Vancouver		McLean		2 – 3
6	April 28	Vancouver	8 – 3	Winnipeg		McLean		3 – 3
7	April 30	Winnipeg	0 – 5	Vancouver		McLean		4 – 3

Smythe Division Finals vs. (S3) Edmonton Oilers – Oilers win 4–2

Game	Date	Visitor	Score	Home	OT	Decision	Attendance	Series
1	May 3	Edmonton	4 – 3	Vancouver	OT	McLean		0 – 1
2	May 4	Edmonton	0 – 4	Vancouver		McLean		1 – 1
3	May 6	Vancouver	2 – 5	Edmonton		McLean		1 – 2
4	May 8	Vancouver	2 – 3	Edmonton		McLean		1 – 3
5	May 10	Edmonton	3 – 4	Vancouver		McLean		2 – 3
6	May 12	Vancouver	0 – 3	Edmonton		McLean		2 – 4

Legend: Win Loss

== Player statistics ==
=== Scoring leaders ===
Note: GP = Games played; G = Goals; A = Assists; Pts = Points; +/- = Plus/minus; PIM = Penalty minutes

Player	GP	G	A	Pts
Trevor Linden	80	31	44	75
Cliff Ronning	80	24	47	71
Igor Larionov	72	21	44	65
Pavel Bure	65	34	26	60
Greg Adams	76	30	27	57

=== Goaltending ===
Note: GP = Games played; TOI = Time on ice (minutes); W = Wins; L = Losses; T = Ties; GA = Goals against; SO = Shutouts; Sv% = Save percentage; GAA = Goals against average

Player	GP	TOI	W	L	T	GA	SO	Sv%	GAA
Kirk McLean	65	3,852	38	17	9	176	5	.901	2.74
Troy Gamble	19	1,009	4	9	3	73	0	.859	4.34

=== Playoffs ===
==== Scoring leaders ====
Note: GP = Games played; G = Goals; A = Assists; Pts = Points; +/- = Plus/minus; PIM = Penalty minutes

Player	GP	G	A	Pts	PIM
Geoff Courtnall	12	6	8	14	20
Cliff Ronning	13	8	5	13	6
Greg Adams	12	7	6	13	6
Trevor Linden	13	4	8	12	6
Pavel Bure	13	6	4	10	14
Jim Sandlak	13	4	6	10	22

==== Goaltending ====
Note: GP = Games played; TOI = Time on ice (minutes); W = Wins; L = Losses; GA = Goals against; SO = Shutouts; Sv% = Save percentage; GAA = Goals against average

Player	GP	TOI	W	L	GA	SO	Sv%	GAA
Kirk McLean	13	785	6	7	33	2	.909	2.52

== Awards and records ==
=== Awards ===
If it was any consolation, the Canucks were pretty successful in post-season hardware. They didn't win the Stanley Cup, but Pavel Bure won the Calder Memorial Trophy as Rookie of the year, Pat Quinn won the Jack Adams Award as Coach of the Year, and Ryan Walter won the Bud Light NHL Man of the Year for his work in the community. As well, Kirk McLean is runner-up for the Vezina Trophy (top goaltender) and is named to the NHL's Second All-Star Team.

==== 1992 Canuck Awards Winners ====
- Molson Cup - Pavel Bure
- President's Trophy - Kirk McLean
- Ram Tough Award - Gerald Diduck
- Cyclone Taylor Trophy - Kirk McLean
- Cyrus H. McLean Trophy - Trevor Linden
- Babe Pratt Trophy - Jyrki Lumme
- Fred J. Hume Award - Garry Valk
- Most Exciting Player - Pavel Bure

===== Kirk McLean =====
- Named NHL Player-of-the-Month for October after posting a 9–2–1 record and a 2.37 GAA. He became the first Canuck to achieve the honor on November 1, 1991.
- Records his 20th victory in a 3–2 win at San Jose on December 22, 1991. Becoming the fastest Canuck goaltender to reach the 20-win mark.
- Selected to represent the Campbell Conference at the 43rd NHL All-Star Game in Philadelphia on January 18, 1992.
- Played in his 250th career NHL game on March 8, 1992, at Philadelphia and recorded his 33rd win of the season to set a single season franchise record for most wins.
- Recorded 100th career NHL win on March 14, 1992, at Calgary.
- Tied for NHL lead with most wins in the 1991–92 NHL season with 38.
- Tied for the NHL lead for most shutouts in the 1991–92 NHL season with 5.
- Named on the NHL Second All-Star Team on June 16, 1992.
- Named on the Sporting News All-Star Second Team on June 16, 1992.
- Nominated for the Vezina Trophy, but lost to Patrick Roy on June 16, 1992.

===== Pavel Bure =====
- Scored his first two NHL goals in an 8–2 victory vs. Los Angeles on November 12, 1991.
- Scored 34 goals to break Ivan Hlinka's franchise rookie goal-scoring record from the 1981–82 season.
- Tied with Ivan Hlinka for the franchise rookie points record with 60.
- Named NHL Rookie-of-the-Month for March/April on April 18, 1992.
- Won the Calder Memorial Trophy as Rookie of the Year on June 16, 1992.

===== Geoff Courtnall =====
- Recorded his 200th career NHL assist on November 1, 1991, vs. St. Louis.
- Recorded his 400th career NHL point on November 3, 1991, vs. Edmonton.
- Scored his 200th career NHL goal on November 5, 1991, vs. Winnipeg.
- Had a 9-game point streak scoring 7 goals and recorded 7 assists for 14 points from October 27-November 16.
- Scored 2 goals and recorded 3 assists for 5 points on December 22, 1991, at Quebec.
- Set a club record with 281 shots on goal.

===== Trevor Linden =====
- Recorded his 200th career NHL and Canuck point on November 5 vs. Winnipeg.
- Selected to represent the Campbell Conference at the 43rd NHL All-Star Game in Philadelphia on January 18, 1992. Linden recorded a goal and an assist at the game.
- Played in his 300th career NHL and Canuck game on March 7, 1992, at Hartford.
- Led the team in scoring for the second-straight season.
- Had an 8-game point streak scoring 2 goals and recorded 11 assists for 13 points.

===== Cliff Ronning =====
- Played 200th career NHL game on October 21, 1991, vs. Toronto.
- Had a 9-game point streak scoring 5 goals and recorded 8 assists for 13 points from October 17-November 5.
- Recorded his 100th career NHL assist on December 7, 1991, at Toronto.
- Recorded his 200th career NHL point on March 8, 1992, at Philadelphia.
- Molson Cup Player of the Month for October and December.

===== Pat Quinn =====
- Sets club record with 42 wins in a single-season.
- Sets club record with 96 points in a single-season.
- Won the Jack Adams Award for Coach of the Year on June 16, 1992.
- Received Coach of the Year honors by the Sporting News on June 16, 1992.

===== Petr Nedved =====
- Scored first multiple goal game on January 7, 1992, vs. San Jose.
- Played in his 100th career NHL and Canuck game on January 7, 1992, vs. San Jose.
- Had 6 multiple point games.

===== Jyrki Lumme =====
- Scored career high 4 points (1–3–4) vs. Minnesota on December 12, 1991.
- Three game goal streak and 3 game point streak (3–4–7) from December 7–12.
- Played in his 200th career NHL game on December 31, 1991, vs. Los Angeles.

===== Greg Adams =====
- Played in his 500th career NHL game on February 13, 1992, at New Jersey.
- Recorded his 400th career NHL point on March 14, 1992, at Calgary.

===== Igor Larionov =====
- Played in his 200th career NHL and Canuck game.
- Recorded his 100th career NHL and Canuck point.

===== Dave Babych =====
- Scored his 1st career hat-trick including the game winner on November 22, 1991, vs. Calgary.
- Played in his 800th career NHL game on March 5, 1992, at Boston.

===== Gerald Diduck =====
- Played his 400th career NHL game on November 21, 1991, at Calgary.
- Recorded his 100th career NHL assist on February 28, 1992, vs. Winnipeg.

===== Gino Odjick =====
- Broke Dave "Tiger" Williams single-season penalty minutes record with 348 doing it in only 65 games on March 2, 1992, vs. St. Louis.
- Played in his 100th career NHL game on March 14, 1992, at Calgary.

===== Others =====
- Ryan Walter won the Bud Light NHL Man of the Year for his work in the community on May 27, 1992.
- Sergio Momesso had a 5-game point streak scoring 2 goals and recorded 3 assists for 5 points.
- Dana Murzyn played his 400th career NHL game on October 19, 1991, vs Calgary.

== Transactions ==
=== Trades ===
June 22, 1991	To Vancouver Canucks Dave Babych	To Minnesota North Stars Tom Kurvers
August 1, 1991	To Vancouver Canucks Robin Bawa	To Washington Capitals Cash
December 19, 1991	To Vancouver Canucks Tom Fergus	To Toronto Maple Leafs Cash
March 9, 1992	To Vancouver Canucks Ken Hammond	To San Jose Sharks 8th round pick in 1992 (C.J. Denomme)

==== Free agents acquired ====
Player	Former team
C Ryan Walter	Montreal Canadiens
D Randy Gregg	Edmonton Oilers

==== Free agents lost ====
Player	New team
LW Steve Bozek	San Jose Sharks
D Jack Capuano	Boston Bruins

==== Expansion draft ====
Vancouver's losses at the 1991 NHL Dispersal and Expansion Drafts in Buffalo, New York.

Round	#	Player	Nationality	Drafted by	Drafted from
1	19	Craig Coxe (C)	United States	San Jose Sharks	Vancouver Canucks

== Draft picks ==
Vancouver's picks at the 1991 NHL entry draft in Buffalo, New York.

Round	#	Player	Nationality	College/Junior/Club team (League)
1	7	Alek Stojanov (RW)	Canada	Hamilton Dukes (OHL)
2	29	Jassen Cullimore (D)	Canada	Peterborough Petes (OHL)
3	51	Sean Pronger (C)	Canada	Bowling Green State University (NCAA)
5	95	Dan Kesa (RW)	Canada	Prince Albert Raiders (WHL)
6	117	Evgeny Namestnikov (D)	Soviet Union	Nizhny Novgorod Torpedo (USSR)
7	139	Brent Thurston (LW)	Canada	Spokane Chiefs (WHL)
8	161	Eric Johnson (RW)	United States	St. Cloud State University (NCAA)
9	183	David Neilson (LW)	United States	Prince Albert Raiders (WHL)
10	205	Brad Barton (RW)	Canada	Kitchener Rangers (OHL)
11	227	Jason Fitzsimmons (G)	Canada	Moose Jaw Warriors (WHL)
12	249	Xavier Majic (C)	Canada	Rensselaer Polytechnic Institute (NCAA)
S	13	Scott Meehan (D)	United States	University of Massachusetts Lowell (Hockey East)

== Farm teams ==
=== Milwaukee Admirals ===
Vancouver Canucks IHL affiliate that play in Milwaukee, Wisconsin and their home arena is the Bradley Center.

=== Columbus Chill ===
Vancouver Canucks ECHL affiliate that play in Columbus, Ohio and their home arena is the Ohio State Fairgrounds Coliseum.

== See also ==
- 1991–92 NHL season
