= 1991–92 Toronto Maple Leafs season =

NHL hockey team season

1991–92 Toronto Maple Leafs
- Division: 5th Norris
- Conference: 10th Campbell
- 1991–92 record: 30–43–7
- Home record: 21–16–3
- Road record: 9–27–4
- Goals for: 234
- Goals against: 294

Team information
- General manager: Cliff Fletcher
- Coach: Tom Watt
- Captain: Wendel Clark
- Alternate captains: Todd Gill; Gary Leeman (Oct.-Jan.); Bob Rouse
- Arena: Maple Leaf Gardens

Team leaders
- Goals: Glenn Anderson (24)
- Assists: Doug Gilmour (34)
- Points: Glenn Anderson (57)
- Penalty minutes: Bob Halkidis (145)
- Plus/minus: Doug Gilmour (+13)
- Wins: Grant Fuhr (25)
- Goals against average: Felix Potvin (2.29)

The 1991–92 Toronto Maple Leafs season was Toronto's 75th season in the National Hockey League (NHL). The Maple Leafs missed the playoffs for the second consecutive year for the first time since the 1983–84 and 1984–85 seasons.

== Off-season ==
Forward Wendel Clark is named team captain, following the departure of defenceman Rob Ramage to the Minnesota North Stars.

=== NHL draft ===
Round	#	Player	Nationality	College/junior/club team
3	47	Yanic Perreault	Canada	Trois-Rivières Draveurs (QMJHL)
4	69	Terry Chitaroni	Canada	Trois-Rivières Draveurs (QMJHL)
5	102	Alexei Kudashov	Soviet Union	Krylya Sovetov (USSR)
6	113	Jeff Perry	Canada	Owen Sound Platers (OHL)
6	120	Alexander Kuzminski	Soviet Union	Sokil Kiev (USSR)
7	135	Martin Prochazka	Czechoslovakia	Poldi SONP Kladno (Czechoslovakia)
8	160	Dmitri Mironov	Soviet Union	Krylya Sovetov (USSR)
8	164	Robb McIntyre	United States	Dubuque Fighting Saints (USHL)
8	167	Tomas Kucharcik	Czechoslovakia	Dukla Jihlava (Czechoslovakia)
9	179	Guy Lehoux	Canada	Drummondville Voltigeurs (QMJHL)
10	201	Gary Miller	Canada	North Bay Centennials (OHL)
11	223	Jonathan Kelley	United States	Arlington Catholic High School (USHS-MA)
12	245	Chris O'Rourke	Canada	University of Alaska Fairbanks (NCAA Independent)
S	3	Patrick McGarry	Canada	Dalhousie University (CIAU)
S	9	Joe McCarthy	United States	University of Vermont (Hockey East)

- Grant Fuhr was traded by Oilers with RW/LW Glenn Anderson and LW Craig Berube to the Toronto Maple Leafs for LW Vincent Damphousse, D Luke Richardson, G Peter Ing, C Scott Thornton and future considerations, September 19, 1991.

== Regular season ==
After starting the season with a 2–1 record, a loss to the Washington Capitals on October 9 began what would become a seven-game losing streak. As the losses piled up, two intrepid Leafs fans from Wilfrid Laurier University went so far as to camp out on their Waterloo rooftop in hopes of inspiring the team to finally win. Enduring poor weather and the scorn of non-Leafs fans across their campus, Brian Gear and Fab Antonelli became minor media celebrities during their quixotic quest. After a disheartening loss to the Detroit Red Wings on October 25, the weary pair were finally able to return to their own beds when the Leafs defeated the Red Wings 6–1 on October 26.

On February 5, 1992, the Leafs scored just 18 seconds into the overtime period to win by a score of 3–2 over the Minnesota North Stars. It would prove to be the fastest overtime goal scored during the 1991–92 regular season.

The Maple Leafs were still in the playoff race with the Minnesota North Stars by mid March, but a 3–5–0 finish to the season ended any playoff hopes. Despite finishing with fewer wins than Toronto, the North Stars clinched the final playoff spot over the Leafs, costing head coach Tom Watt his job.

During the regular season, the Maple Leafs tied the Montreal Canadiens for the fewest short-handed goals allowed, with just five.

=== The Doug Gilmour trade ===
Several months after the Maple Leafs hired Cliff Fletcher to be their new general manager, Fletcher made a blockbuster trade with the Calgary Flames (where he had previously been general manager). On January 2, 1992, the Maple Leafs acquired Doug Gilmour, along with Jamie Macoun, Ric Nattress, Kent Manderville and Rick Wamsley, in exchange for Gary Leeman, Alexander Godynyuk, Jeff Reese, Michel Petit and Craig Berube. The ten-player trade was the largest in NHL history and, statistically speaking, one of the most lopsided.

=== Season standings ===
Norris Division
	GP	W	L	T	GF	GA	Pts
**Detroit Red Wings**	**80**	**43**	**25**	**12**	**320**	**256**	**98**
**Chicago Blackhawks**	**80**	**36**	**29**	**15**	**257**	**236**	**87**
**St. Louis Blues**	**80**	**36**	**33**	**11**	**279**	**266**	**83**
**Minnesota North Stars**	**80**	**32**	**42**	**6**	**246**	**278**	**70**
Toronto Maple Leafs	80	30	43	7	234	294	67

Campbell Conference
R		Div	GP	W	L	T	GF	GA	Pts
1	**Detroit Red Wings**	**NRS**	**80**	**43**	**25**	**12**	**320**	**256**	**98**
2	**Vancouver Canucks**	**SMY**	**80**	**42**	**26**	**12**	**285**	**250**	**96**
3	**Chicago Blackhawks**	**NRS**	**80**	**36**	**29**	**15**	**257**	**236**	**87**
4	**Los Angeles Kings**	**SMY**	**80**	**35**	**31**	**14**	**287**	**296**	**84**
5	**St. Louis Blues**	**NRS**	**80**	**36**	**33**	**11**	**279**	**266**	**83**
6	**Edmonton Oilers**	**SMY**	**80**	**36**	**34**	**10**	**295**	**297**	**82**
7	**Winnipeg Jets**	**SMY**	**80**	**33**	**32**	**15**	**251**	**244**	**81**
8	Calgary Flames	SMY	80	31	37	12	296	305	74
9	**Minnesota North Stars**	**NRS**	**80**	**32**	**42**	**6**	**246**	**278**	**70**
10	Toronto Maple Leafs	NRS	80	30	43	7	234	294	67
11	San Jose Sharks	SMY	80	17	58	5	219	359	39

Divisions: NRS – Norris, SMY – Smythe
bold – Qualified for playoffs

== Schedule and results ==
1991–92 regular season
October

Game	Result	Date	Score	Opponent	Record
1	L	October 3, 1991	3–4	@ Montreal Canadiens (1991–92)	0–1–0
2	W	October 5, 1991	8–5	Detroit Red Wings (1991–92)	1–1–0
3	W	October 7, 1991	3–0	St. Louis Blues (1991–92)	2–1–0
4	L	October 9, 1991	4–5	Washington Capitals (1991–92)	2–2–0
5	L	October 12, 1991	1–2	Vancouver Canucks (1991–92)	2–3–0
6	L	October 15, 1991	1–5	@ St. Louis Blues (1991–92)	2–4–0
7	L	October 17, 1991	4–6	@ Calgary Flames (1991–92)	2–5–0
8	L	October 19, 1991	2–4	@ Winnipeg Jets (1991–92)	2–6–0
9	L	October 21, 1991	1–4	@ Vancouver Canucks (1991–92)	2–7–0
10	L	October 25, 1991	0–4	@ Detroit Red Wings (1991–92)	2–8–0
11	W	October 26, 1991	6–1	Detroit Red Wings (1991–92)	3–8–0
12	T	October 28, 1991	1–1 OT	St. Louis Blues (1991–92)	3–8–1

November

Game	Result	Date	Score	Opponent	Record
13	L	November 1, 1991	0–4	@ Washington Capitals (1991–92)	3–9–1
14	L	November 2, 1991	2–5	Los Angeles Kings (1991–92)	3–10–1
15	W	November 4, 1991	4–1	San Jose Sharks (1991–92)	4–10–1
16	W	November 6, 1991	4–3	Minnesota North Stars (1991–92)	5–10–1
17	T	November 8, 1991	3–3 OT	@ New York Rangers (1991–92)	5–10–2
18	L	November 9, 1991	1–6	Calgary Flames (1991–92)	5–11–2
19	L	November 12, 1991	0–7	@ Minnesota North Stars (1991–92)	5–12–2
20	L	November 14, 1991	0–3	@ Chicago Blackhawks (1991–92)	5–13–2
21	T	November 16, 1991	2–2 OT	Chicago Blackhawks (1991–92)	5–13–3
22	L	November 17, 1991	1–3	Hartford Whalers (1991–92)	5–14–3
23	L	November 20, 1991	2–5	@ St. Louis Blues (1991–92)	5–15–3
24	W	November 22, 1991	3–1	@ San Jose Sharks (1991–92)	6–15–3
25	T	November 26, 1991	4–4 OT	@ Los Angeles Kings (1991–92)	6–15–4
26	W	November 29, 1991	3–2	@ Minnesota North Stars (1991–92)	7–15–4
27	L	November 30, 1991	3–4	Minnesota North Stars (1991–92)	7–16–4

December

Game	Result	Date	Score	Opponent	Record
28	W	December 4, 1991	3–0	@ Hartford Whalers (1991–92)	8–16–4
29	W	December 7, 1991	6–3	Vancouver Canucks (1991–92)	9–16–4
30	L	December 9, 1991	1–4	Montreal Canadiens (1991–92)	9–17–4
31	L	December 11, 1991	4–5	New York Islanders (1991–92)	9–18–4
32	T	December 12, 1991	1–1 OT	@ Philadelphia Flyers (1991–92)	9–18–5
33	L	December 14, 1991	3–4	@ Boston Bruins (1991–92)	9–19–5
34	L	December 18, 1991	5–7	Edmonton Oilers (1991–92)	9–20–5
35	L	December 20, 1991	3–4	@ Washington Capitals (1991–92)	9–21–5
36	L	December 21, 1991	1–4	Buffalo Sabres (1991–92)	9–22–5
37	W	December 23, 1991	3–1	Winnipeg Jets (1991–92)	10–22–5
38	L	December 26, 1991	1–12	@ Pittsburgh Penguins (1991–92)	10–23–5
39	L	December 28, 1991	4–5	Detroit Red Wings (1991–92)	10–24–5
40	L	December 30, 1991	2–5	@ Quebec Nordiques (1991–92)	10–25–5

January

Game	Result	Date	Score	Opponent	Record
41	L	January 3, 1992	4–6	@ Detroit Red Wings (1991–92)	10–26–5
42	L	January 4, 1992	2–4	Chicago Blackhawks (1991–92)	10–27–5
43	W	January 6, 1992	3–2 OT	St. Louis Blues (1991–92)	11–27–5
44	L	January 9, 1992	0–2	@ Chicago Blackhawks (1991–92)	11–28–5
45	W	January 11, 1992	4–3	@ New Jersey Devils (1991–92)	12–28–5
46	L	January 16, 1992	0–4	@ Chicago Blackhawks (1991–92)	12–29–5
47	L	January 22, 1992	2–5	Boston Bruins (1991–92)	12–30–5
48	W	January 23, 1992	4–3	@ New York Islanders (1991–92)	13–30–5
49	W	January 25, 1992	6–4	Philadelphia Flyers (1991–92)	14–30–5
50	W	January 29, 1992	5–2	Quebec Nordiques (1991–92)	15–30–5

February

Game	Result	Date	Score	Opponent	Record
51	W	February 1, 1992	6–4	New Jersey Devils (1991–92)	16–30–5
52	L	February 3, 1992	2–4	@ Minnesota North Stars (1991–92)	16–31–5
53	W	February 5, 1992	3–2 OT	Minnesota North Stars (1991–92)	17–31–5
54	W	February 7, 1992	4–3	@ Detroit Red Wings (1991–92)	18–31–5
55	W	February 8, 1992	6–4	Montreal Canadiens (1991–92)	19–31–5
56	W	February 11, 1992	4–3	Detroit Red Wings (1991–92)	20–31–5
57	L	February 15, 1992	1–3	Winnipeg Jets (1991–92)	20–32–5
58	W	February 16, 1992	7–5	Edmonton Oilers (1991–92)	21–32–5
59	L	February 18, 1992	1–7	@ Pittsburgh Penguins (1991–92)	21–33–5
60	L	February 20, 1992	2–3	@ Detroit Red Wings (1991–92)	21–34–5
61	L	February 22, 1992	3–4	@ St. Louis Blues (1991–92)	21–35–5
62	T	February 25, 1992	5–5 OT	New Jersey Devils (1991–92)	21–35–6
63	L	February 27, 1992	2–4	@ Boston Bruins (1991–92)	21–36–6
64	W	February 29, 1992	6–5 OT	Chicago Blackhawks (1991–92)	22–36–6

March

Game	Result	Date	Score	Opponent	Record
65	W	March 1, 1992	6–2	Minnesota North Stars (1991–92)	23–36–6
66	W	March 4, 1992	5–2	@ Edmonton Oilers (1991–92)	24–36–6
67	T	March 5, 1992	5–5 OT	@ Calgary Flames (1991–92)	24–36–7
68	L	March 8, 1992	1–4	@ San Jose Sharks (1991–92)	24–37–7
69	L	March 9, 1992	1–4	@ Los Angeles Kings (1991–92)	24–38–7
70	W	March 11, 1992	3–0	@ Minnesota North Stars (1991–92)	25–38–7
71	W	March 14, 1992	6–3	Pittsburgh Penguins (1991–92)	26–38–7
72	W	March 17, 1992	4–3 OT	Quebec Nordiques (1991–92)	27–38–7
73	L	March 21, 1992	1–3	Chicago Blackhawks (1991–92)	27–39–7
74	W	March 23, 1992	3–2	St. Louis Blues (1991–92)	28–39–7
75	L	March 25, 1992	2–5	@ Buffalo Sabres (1991–92)	28–40–7
76	W	March 28, 1992	3–2	@ St. Louis Blues (1991–92)	29–40–7
77	L	March 29, 1992	1–5	@ Chicago Blackhawks (1991–92)	29–41–7

April

Game	Result	Date	Score	Opponent	Record
78	L	April 12, 1992	2–6	New York Islanders (1991–92)	29–42–7
79	L	April 13, 1992	2–6	@ Philadelphia Flyers (1991–92)	29–43–7
80	W	April 15, 1992	4–2	New York Rangers (1991–92)	30–43–7

Legend: Win (2 points) Loss (0 points) Tie (1 point)

== Player statistics ==
=== Forwards ===
Note: GP= Games played; G= Goals; A= Assists; Pts = Points; PIM = Penalties in minutes

Player	GP	G	A	Pts	PIM
Glenn Anderson	72	24	33	57	100
Doug Gilmour	40	15	34	49	32
Peter Zezel	64	16	33	49	26
Wendel Clark	43	19	21	40	123
Brian Bradley	59	10	21	31	48
Mike Bullard	65	14	14	28	40
Daniel Marois	63	15	11	26	76
Mike Krushelnyski	72	9	15	24	72
Rob Pearson	47	14	10	24	58
Gary Leeman	34	7	13	20	44
Lucien DeBlois	54	8	11	19	39
Claude Loiselle	64	6	9	15	102
Mike Foligno	33	6	8	14	50

=== Defencemen ===
Note: GP= Games played; G= Goals; A= Assists; Pts = Points; PIM = Penalties in minutes

Player	GP	G	A	Pts	PIM
Dave Ellett	79	18	33	51	95
Bob Rouse	79	3	19	22	97
Todd Gill	74	2	15	17	91
Ric Nattress	36	2	14	16	32
Jamie Macoun	39	3	13	16	18
Michel Petit	34	1	13	14	85
Darryl Shannon	48	2	8	10	23
Alexander Godynyuk	31	3	6	9	59
Bob Halkidis	46	3	3	6	145
Dmitri Mironov	7	1	0	1	0
Drake Berehowsky	1	0	0	0	0
Len Esau	2	0	0	0	0

=== Goaltending ===
Note: GP= Games played; W= Wins; L= Losses; T = Ties; SO = Shutouts; GAA = Goals Against Average

Player	GP	W	L	T	SO	GAA
Grant Fuhr	66	25	33	5	2	2.66

== Awards and records ==
- Grant Fuhr, Molson Cup (Most game star selections for Toronto Maple Leafs)

== Transactions ==
The Maple Leafs have been involved in the following transactions during the 1991–92 season.

=== Trades ===
July 26, 1991	To Philadelphia Flyers 3rd round pick in 1993 (Vaclav Prospal)	To Toronto Maple Leafs Mike Bullard
September 19, 1991	To Edmonton Oilers Vincent Damphousse; Peter Ing; Scott Thornton; Luke Richardson; Cash	To Toronto Maple Leafs Glenn Anderson; Grant Fuhr; Craig Berube
October 7, 1991	To Edmonton Oilers Cash	To Toronto Maple Leafs Ken Linseman
December 18, 1991	To Vancouver Canucks Tom Fergus	To Toronto Maple Leafs Cash
December 26, 1991	To New York Rangers Mike Stevens	To Toronto Maple Leafs Guy Larose
January 2, 1992	To Calgary Flames Craig Berube; Alexander Godynyuk; Gary Leeman; Michel Petit; Jeff Reese	To Toronto Maple Leafs Doug Gilmour; Jamie Macoun; Ric Nattress; Rick Wamsley; Kent Manderville
February 27, 1992	To Washington Capitals Cash	To Toronto Maple Leafs Mark Ferner
March 10, 1992	To Buffalo Sabres Dave Hannan	To Toronto Maple Leafs 5th round pick in 1992 (Chris DeRuiter)
March 10, 1992	To New York Islanders Daniel Marois; Claude Loiselle	To Toronto Maple Leafs Ken Baumgartner; Dave McLlwain
March 10, 1992	To Winnipeg Jets Lucien DeBlois	To Toronto Maple Leafs Mark Osborne
June 2, 1992	To Calgary Flames Todd Gillingham	To Toronto Maple Leafs Cash
June 5, 1992	To Detroit Red Wings Future Considerations	To Toronto Maple Leafs Brad Marsh
June 15, 1992	To San Jose Sharks Cash	To Toronto Maple Leafs Jarmo Myllys
June 20, 1992	To New York Islanders 1st round pick in 1992 (Darius Kasparaitis)	To Toronto Maple Leafs 1st round pick in 1992 (Brandon Convery); 2nd round pick in 1992 (Jim Carey)
June 20, 1992	To Washington Capitals 2nd round pick in 1992 (Jim Carey); 3rd round pick in 1992 (Stefan Ustorf); 4th round pick in 1993 (John Jakopin)	To Toronto Maple Leafs 1st round pick in 1992 (Grant Marshall); 4th round pick in 1992 (Mike Raitar)

=== Expansion draft ===
June 18, 1992	To Tampa Bay Lightning Brian Bradley
June 18, 1992	To Tampa Bay Lightning; Keith Osborne

=== Free agents ===
Player	Former team
Bob Halkidis	Los Angeles Kings
Brad Aitken	Edmonton Oilers
Mike MacWilliam	Undrafted Free Agent
Kevin McClelland	Detroit Red Wings
Andrew McKim	Calgary Flames

Player	New team
Aaron Broten	Winnipeg Jets
Dave Reid	Boston Bruins

== Farm teams ==
- The Toronto Maple Leafs farm team was based in the American Hockey League. The farm team relocated from Newmarket, Ontario to St. John's, Newfoundland. The St. John's Maple Leafs were coached by Marc Crawford and qualified for the 1992 Calder Cup Finals. The St. John's team played the Adirondack Red Wings in the finals. Said finals lasted seven games and each game was won by the home team. Adirondack prevailed in the finals and were led by former Toronto Maple Leafs goalie Allan Bester, who would go on to win the Jack A. Butterfield Trophy.
