= Rick Lessard =

- Born: January 9, 1968 (age 58) Timmins, Ontario, Canada
- Height: 6 ft 2 in (188 cm)
- Weight: 200 lb (91 kg; 14 st 4 lb)
- Position: Defence
- Shot: Left
- Played for: Calgary Flames; San Jose Sharks
- NHL draft: 142nd overall, 1986; Calgary Flames
- Playing career: 1988–1994

Rick Lessard (born January 9, 1968) is a Canadian former professional ice hockey player who played 15 games in the National Hockey League (NHL) for the Calgary Flames and San Jose Sharks. He was a seventh round selection by Calgary, 142nd overall, at the 1986 NHL entry draft. Lessard's six-year professional career was spent primarily in the minor leagues; he was a member of the Kansas City Blades' Turner Cup championship team in 1991–92.

== Playing career ==
A native of Timmins, Ontario, Lessard played four seasons of junior hockey with the Ottawa 67's of the Ontario Hockey League (OHL) between 1984 and 1988. A rugged defenceman who was willing to fight, he scored only 13 goals in his 248-game junior career, but recorded 757 penalty minutes. In his final OHL season, 1987–88, Lessard served as team captain as the 67's reached the OHL final.

The Calgary Flames selected Lessard with their seventh round selection, 142nd overall, at the 1986 NHL entry draft. When he turned professional in 1988–89, the Flames assigned him to their International Hockey League (IHL) affiliate, the Salt Lake Golden Eagles. Lessard played the majority of the season with Salt Lake where, as was one of the IHL's leading defensive scorers, he earned a brief call-up to Calgary. He played his first six NHL contests, recording one assist, and was named to the IHL First All-Star Team after scoring 10 goals and 52 points in 76 games with the Golden Eagles.

Lessard played the following two seasons with Salt Lake, though he appeared in NHL one game with Calgary in 1989–90. His rights were transferred to the newly formed San Jose Sharks in 1991 after they selected him with the fifth overall pick in the 1991 NHL Expansion Draft. Lessard appeared in eight games with the Sharks in 1991–92 but spent the majority of the season with the IHL's Kansas City Blades. He recorded 19 points in 41 games for the Blades who won the Turner Cup championship.

The following two seasons had Lessard take on a nomadic existence as he played for several minor league teams. He began the 1992–93 season in Kansas City before the Sharks loaned him to the Boston Bruins, who assigned him to the Providence Bruins, their American Hockey League (AHL) affiliate. After six games with Providence, Lessard was transferred to the Hamilton Canucks after the Sharks dealt him to the Vancouver Canucks organization in exchange for Robin Bawa on December 15, 1992. He returned to Salt Lake City in the summer of 1993 to play with the Utah Rollerbees of Roller Hockey International, He parlayed that into a return to the Salt Lake Golden Eagles to begin the 1993–94 season. Lessard also played with the South Carolina Stingrays of the East Coast Hockey League and the AHL's Rochester Americans that season before retiring after six professional seasons.

== Career statistics ==
| | | | Regular season | | | | | Playoffs |
| Season | Team | League | GP | G | A | Pts | PIM | GP | G | A | Pts | PIM |
|---|---|---|---|---|---|---|---|---|---|---|---|---|
| 1984–85 | Ottawa 67's | OHL | 60 | 2 | 13 | 15 | 128 | 5 | 1 | 4 | 5 | 10 |
| 1985–86 | Ottawa 67's | OHL | 64 | 1 | 20 | 21 | 231 | — | — | — | — | — |
| 1986–87 | Ottawa 67's | OHL | 66 | 5 | 36 | 41 | 188 | 11 | 1 | 7 | 8 | 30 |
| 1987–88 | Ottawa 67's | OHL | 58 | 5 | 34 | 39 | 210 | 16 | 1 | 10 | 11 | 31 |
| 1988–89 | Salt Lake Golden Eagles | IHL | 76 | 10 | 42 | 52 | 239 | 14 | 1 | 6 | 7 | 35 |
| 1988–89 | Calgary Flames | NHL | 6 | 0 | 1 | 1 | 2 | — | — | — | — | — |
| 1989–90 | Salt Lake Golden Eagles | IHL | 66 | 3 | 18 | 21 | 169 | 10 | 1 | 2 | 3 | 64 |
| 1990–91 | Salt Lake Golden Eagles | IHL | 80 | 8 | 27 | 35 | 272 | 4 | 0 | 1 | 1 | 12 |
| 1990–91 | Calgary Flames | NHL | 1 | 0 | 1 | 1 | 0 | — | — | — | — | — |
| 1991–92 | San Jose Sharks | NHL | 8 | 0 | 2 | 2 | 16 | — | — | — | — | — |
| 1991–92 | Kansas City Blades | IHL | 46 | 3 | 16 | 19 | 117 | 3 | 0 | 0 | 0 | 2 |
| 1992–93 | Hamilton Canucks | AHL | 52 | 0 | 17 | 17 | 51 | — | — | — | — | — |
| 1992–93 | Providence Bruins | AHL | 6 | 0 | 0 | 0 | 6 | — | — | — | — | — |
| 1992–93 | Kansas City Blades | IHL | 1 | 0 | 0 | 0 | 0 | — | — | — | — | — |
| 1993–94 | Rochester Americans | AHL | 8 | 1 | 2 | 3 | 2 | 4 | 0 | 0 | 0 | 2 |
| 1993–94 | Salt Lake Golden Eagles | IHL | 31 | 1 | 2 | 3 | 110 | — | — | — | — | — |
| 1993–94 | South Carolina Stingrays | ECHL | 5 | 1 | 0 | 1 | 10 | 3 | 0 | 2 | 2 | 14 |
| IHL totals | | | 300 | 25 | 105 | 130 | 907 | 31 | 2 | 9 | 11 | 113 |
| NHL totals | | | 15 | 0 | 4 | 4 | 18 | — | — | — | — | — |
