= Mike Colman =

American ice hockey player

- Born: August 4, 1968 Stoneham, Massachusetts, U.S.
- Died: April 5, 1995 (aged 26) Kansas City, Missouri, U.S.
- Height: 6 ft 3 in (191 cm)
- Weight: 218 lb (99 kg; 15 st 8 lb)
- Position: Defense
- Shot: Right
- Played for: Kansas City Blades; San Jose Sharks; Ferris State Bulldogs; Humboldt Broncos
- NHL draft: Undrafted
- Playing career: 1990–1994

Michael Anthony Colman (August 4, 1968 – April 5, 1995) was an American ice hockey defenseman who played fifteen games for the San Jose Sharks in the 1991–92 NHL season. He was born in Stoneham, Massachusetts.

Colman died as a result of injuries suffered in a car accident in Kansas City on April 5, 1995, while playing for the Kansas City Blades of the International Hockey League.

== Career statistics ==
			Regular season					Playoffs
Season	Team	League	GP	G	A	Pts	PIM	GP	G	A	Pts	PIM
1987–88	Humboldt Broncos	SJHL	55	3	7	10	188	—	—	—	—	—
1988–89	Humboldt Broncos	SJHL	44	3	17	20	161	—	—	—	—	—
1989–90	Ferris State University	NCAA	23	0	4	4	62	—	—	—	—	—
1990–91	Kansas City Blades	IHL	66	1	6	7	115	—	—	—	—	—
1991–92	San Jose Sharks	NHL	15	0	1	1	32	—	—	—	—	—
1991–92	Kansas City Blades	IHL	59	0	4	4	130	3	0	0	0	4
1992–93	Kansas City Blades	IHL	80	1	5	6	191	12	1	0	1	34
1993–94	Kansas City Blades	IHL	77	4	7	11	215	—	—	—	—	—
NHL totals			15	0	1	1	32	—	—	—	—	—

== See also ==
- List of ice hockey players who died during their playing career
