= Dale Craigwell =

Canadian ice hockey player (born 1971)

- Born: April 24, 1971 (age 55) Toronto, Ontario, Canada
- Height: 5 ft 11 in (180 cm)
- Weight: 175 lb (79 kg; 12 st 7 lb)
- Position: Centre
- Shot: Left
- Played for: San Jose Sharks
- NHL draft: 199th overall, 1991; San Jose Sharks
- Playing career: 1991–2001

Dale A. Craigwell (born April 24, 1971) is a Canadian former professional hockey player who played professionally for 9 years and played parts of 3 years with the San Jose Sharks in the NHL. He played centre and shot left-handed.

== Biography ==
Craigwell was born in Toronto, Ontario. As a youth, he played in the 1984 Quebec International Pee-Wee Hockey Tournament with a minor ice hockey team from Oshawa.

Craigwell was drafted by the Sharks in the 10th round, 199th overall in the 1991 NHL Entry Draft. He was the 11th player ever drafted by the Sharks. Prior to being drafted he played in the Ontario Hockey League with the Oshawa Generals for 3 years, scoring 95 points in 56 games his final year there.

During the 1991–1992 NHL season, the first for the Sharks, Craigwell was called up in the middle of the season and skated in 32 games, scoring 16 points. The 1993–1994 season was the first for Craigwell to play full-time for the Sharks, but the results were dismal, as he was regulated to a defensive role and scored only 9 points the whole year. The following year he suffered an ankle injury and missed the entire 1994–1995 season.

Craigwell then played for the Kansas City Blades in the now defunct IHL for 3 years, followed by 3 more years playing in Europe, one in Germany and two in England before retiring after the 2000–2001 season.

== Career statistics ==
=== Regular season and playoffs ===
| | | | Regular season | | | | | Playoffs |
| Season | Team | League | GP | G | A | Pts | PIM | GP | G | A | Pts | PIM |
|---|---|---|---|---|---|---|---|---|---|---|---|---|
| 1988–89 | Oshawa Generals | OHL | 55 | 9 | 14 | 23 | 15 | 6 | 0 | 0 | 0 | 0 |
| 1989–90 | Oshawa Generals | OHL | 64 | 22 | 41 | 63 | 39 | 17 | 7 | 7 | 14 | 11 |
| 1990–91 | Oshawa Generals | OHL | 56 | 27 | 68 | 95 | 34 | 16 | 7 | 16 | 23 | 9 |
| 1991–92 | Kansas City Blades | IHL | 48 | 6 | 19 | 25 | 29 | 12 | 4 | 7 | 11 | 4 |
| 1991–92 | San Jose Sharks | NHL | 32 | 5 | 11 | 16 | 8 | — | — | — | — | — |
| 1992–93 | Kansas City Blades | IHL | 60 | 15 | 38 | 53 | 24 | 12 | 7 | 5 | 12 | 2 |
| 1992–93 | San Jose Sharks | NHL | 8 | 3 | 1 | 4 | 4 | — | — | — | — | — |
| 1993–94 | Kansas City Blades | IHL | 5 | 3 | 1 | 4 | 0 | — | — | — | — | — |
| 1993–94 | San Jose Sharks | NHL | 58 | 3 | 6 | 9 | 16 | — | — | — | — | — |
| 1995–96 | San Francisco Spiders | IHL | 75 | 11 | 49 | 60 | 38 | 4 | 2 | 0 | 2 | 0 |
| 1996–97 | Kansas City Blades | IHL | 82 | 17 | 51 | 68 | 34 | 3 | 1 | 0 | 1 | 0 |
| 1997–98 | Kansas City Blades | IHL | 81 | 13 | 42 | 55 | 12 | 11 | 2 | 9 | 11 | 2 |
| 1998–99 | Kansas City Blades | IHL | 61 | 11 | 28 | 39 | 14 | 3 | 0 | 2 | 2 | 2 |
| 1998–99 | Augsburger Panther | DEL | 17 | 1 | 4 | 5 | 4 | — | — | — | — | — |
| 1999–00 | Sheffield Steelers | BISL | 25 | 7 | 18 | 25 | 0 | 7 | 0 | 6 | 6 | 2 |
| 2000–01 | Sheffield Steelers | BISL | 38 | 7 | 18 | 25 | 22 | 8 | 4 | 2 | 6 | 2 |
| IHL totals | | | 412 | 76 | 228 | 304 | 141 | 45 | 16 | 23 | 39 | 10 |
| NHL totals | | | 98 | 11 | 18 | 29 | 28 | — | — | — | — | — |

=== International ===
| Year | Team | Event | GP | G | A | Pts | PIM |
|---|---|---|---|---|---|---|---|
| 1991 | Canada | WJC | 7 | 1 | 2 | 3 | 0 |
| Junior totals | | | 7 | 1 | 2 | 3 | 0 |
