= David Bruce (ice hockey) =

Canadian ice hockey player (born 1964)

- Born: October 7, 1964 (age 61) Thunder Bay, Ontario, Canada
- Height: 5 ft 11 in (180 cm)
- Weight: 190 lb (86 kg; 13 st 8 lb)
- Position: Left wing
- Shot: Right
- Played for: San Jose Sharks; St. Louis Blues; Vancouver Canucks
- NHL draft: 30th overall, 1983; Vancouver Canucks
- Playing career: 1984–1999

David Bruce (born October 7, 1964) is a Canadian former professional ice hockey player who played for the Vancouver Canucks, St. Louis Blues, and San Jose Sharks of the NHL.

== Early life ==
Born in Thunder Bay, Ontario, Bruce played junior hockey for the Kitchener Rangers from 1982 to 1984.

== Career ==
Bruce was drafted by the Vancouver Canucks in the 1983 NHL entry draft. He turned professional in 1984 with the Fredericton Express AHL affiliate of Vancouver. Bruce made his NHL debut in the 1985–86 season with the Canucks. Bruce played in the Canucks' organization until 1990, when he signed as a free agent with the St. Louis Blues.

Bruce played one season in the Blues' organization before being chosen in the 1991 NHL Expansion Draft by the new San Jose Sharks. Bruce played the 1991–92 season with the Sharks, his last full season in the NHL. He remained in the Sharks' organization until 1998, when he joined EV Landshut of the German League. He retired after the season.

== Career statistics ==
=== Regular season and playoffs ===
			Regular season					Playoffs
Season	Team	League	GP	G	A	Pts	PIM	GP	G	A	Pts	PIM
1982–83	Kitchener Rangers	OHL	67	36	35	71	199	12	7	9	16	27
1983–84	Kitchener Rangers	OHL	62	52	40	92	203	10	5	8	13	20
1984–85	Fredericton Express	AHL	56	14	11	25	104	5	0	0	0	37
1985–86	Fredericton Express	AHL	66	25	16	41	151	2	0	1	1	12
1985–86	Vancouver Canucks	NHL	12	0	1	1	14	1	0	0	0	0
1986–87	Fredericton Express	AHL	17	7	6	13	73	—	—	—	—	—
1986–87	Vancouver Canucks	NHL	50	9	7	16	109	—	—	—	—	—
1987–88	Fredericton Express	AHL	30	27	18	45	115	—	—	—	—	—
1987–88	Vancouver Canucks	NHL	28	7	3	10	57	—	—	—	—	—
1988–89	Vancouver Canucks	NHL	53	7	7	14	65	—	—	—	—	—
1989–90	Milwaukee Admirals	IHL	68	40	35	75	148	6	5	3	8	0
1990–91	Peoria Rivermen	IHL	60	64	52	116	78	18	18	11	29	40
1990–91	St. Louis Blues	NHL	12	1	2	3	14	2	0	0	0	2
1991–92	Kansas City Blades	IHL	7	5	5	10	6	—	—	—	—	—
1991–92	San Jose Sharks	NHL	60	22	16	38	46	—	—	—	—	—
1992–93	San Jose Sharks	NHL	17	2	3	5	33	—	—	—	—	—
1993–94	Kansas City Blades	IHL	72	40	24	64	115	—	—	—	—	—
1993–94	San Jose Sharks	NHL	2	0	0	0	0	—	—	—	—	—
1994–95	Kansas City Blades	IHL	63	33	25	58	80	—	—	—	—	—
1995–96	Kansas City Blades	IHL	62	27	26	53	84	1	0	0	0	8
1996–97	Kansas City Blades	IHL	79	45	24	69	90	3	0	0	0	2
1997–98	Kansas City Blades	IHL	54	20	12	32	58	11	3	2	5	21
1998–99	EV Landshut	DEL	44	4	9	13	20	—	—	—	—	—
IHL totals			465	274	203	477	659	39	26	16	42	71
NHL totals			234	48	39	87	338	3	0	0	0	2
