= Pat MacLeod =

Canadian ice hockey player

- Born: June 15, 1969 (age 56) Melfort, Saskatchewan, Canada
- Height: 5 ft 11 in (180 cm)
- Weight: 190 lb (86 kg; 13 st 8 lb)
- Position: Defence
- Shot: Left
- Played for: Minnesota North Stars; San Jose Sharks; Dallas Stars
- NHL draft: 87th overall, 1989; Minnesota North Stars
- Playing career: 1989–2000

Patrick Lee MacLeod (born June 15, 1969) is a Canadian former professional ice hockey defenceman who played in the National Hockey League for the Minnesota North Stars, San Jose Sharks and Dallas Stars during the 1990s.

MacLeod was drafted 87th overall by the Minnesota North Stars in the 1989 NHL entry draft. He participated in 53 games throughout his NHL career, tallying 5 goals and 13 assists for a total of 18 points. Notably, he scored two goals in the Sharks' first NHL game after being chosen by the team from Minnesota in the 1991 expansion draft.

== Career statistics ==
			Regular season					Playoffs
Season	Team	League	GP	G	A	Pts	PIM	GP	G	A	Pts	PIM
1986–87	Fort Saskatchewan Traders	AJHL	59	12	40	52	29	—	—	—	—	—
1987–88	Kamloops Blazers	WHL	50	13	33	46	27	18	2	7	9	6
1988–89	Kamloops Blazers	WHL	37	11	34	45	14	15	8	20	28	8
1989–90	Kalamazoo Wings	IHL	82	9	38	47	27	10	1	6	7	2
1990–91	Minnesota North Stars	NHL	1	0	1	1	0	—	—	—	—	—
1990–91	Kalamazoo Wings	IHL	59	10	30	40	16	11	1	2	3	5
1991–92	San Jose Sharks	NHL	37	5	11	16	4	—	—	—	—	—
1991–92	Kansas City Blades	IHL	45	9	21	30	19	11	1	4	5	4
1992–93	San Jose Sharks	NHL	13	0	1	1	10	—	—	—	—	—
1992–93	Kansas City Blades	IHL	18	8	8	16	14	10	2	4	6	7
1993–94	Milwaukee Admirals	IHL	73	21	52	73	18	3	1	2	3	0
1994–95	Milwaukee Admirals	IHL	69	11	36	47	16	15	3	6	9	8
1995–96	Dallas Stars	NHL	2	0	0	0	0	—	—	—	—	—
1995–96	Michigan K-Wings	IHL	50	3	23	26	18	7	0	3	3	0
1996–97	Färjestad BK	SHL	12	1	2	3	4	—	—	—	—	—
1996–97	Cincinnati Cyclones	IHL	41	5	8	13	8	3	2	0	2	0
1997–98	Cincinnati Cyclones	IHL	78	16	39	55	51	9	0	6	6	8
1998–99	Cincinnati Cyclones	IHL	18	5	5	10	4	3	0	2	2	4
1999–00	Florida Everblades	ECHL	3	0	2	2	4	—	—	—	—	—
1999–00	Cincinnati Cyclones	IHL	62	1	18	19	29	7	0	1	1	0
NHL totals			53	5	13	18	14	—	—	—	—	—
IHL totals			595	98	278	376	220	89	11	36	47	38

== Awards ==
- WHL West Second All-Star Team – 1989
