= John Weisbrod =

American ice hockey player and executive

- Born: October 8, 1968 (age 57) Syosset, New York, U.S.
- Height: 6 ft 3 in (191 cm)
- Weight: 215 lb (98 kg; 15 st 5 lb)
- Position: Centre
- Shot: Right
- Played for: Kansas City Blades
- NHL draft: 73rd overall, 1987; Minnesota North Stars
- Playing career: 1991–1993

John Weisbrod (born October 8, 1968) is an American former professional ice hockey player, who previously served as assistant general manager for the Vancouver Canucks until December 5, 2021.

== Early life and playing career ==
Weisbrod played for Harvard from 1987 to 1991, highlighted by an NCAA Championship in 1989. Weisbrod was drafted by the Minnesota North Stars in round 4, #73 overall in the 1987 NHL Entry Draft and then was acquired and signed by San Jose in 1991. Weisbrod retired following a shoulder injury in 1993.

== Early Front-Office Work ==
Weisbrod was general manager and director of operations for the Albany River Rats from 1993 to 1997, winning the Calder Cup in 1995. From 1997 to 2000, Weisbrod served as VP and GM of the RDV Sports IHL Orlando Solar Bears.

== NBA Executive ==
=== Orlando Magic ===
In April 2000, Weisbrod was named chief operating officer of RDV Sports, putting him in charge of the business operations of all of the RDV entities (Orlando Magic NBA, Orlando Solar Bears IHL, Orlando Miracle WNBA, and the RDV Sportsplex). He was still the general manager of the Solar Bears where he guided the team to the IHL Turner Cup Championship in 2001 and remained in that position until the IHL disbanded in June 2001. In 2004, he was named general manager of the Orlando Magic, a title he held while remaining COO of RDV Sports. On May 23, 2005, Weisbrod resigned from his position of general manager and chief operating officer of the Orlando Magic, citing an opportunity to return to an executive position in the National Hockey League.

== NHL Executive ==
=== Dallas Stars ===
On July 14, 2005, the Dallas Stars of the NHL announced that Weisbrod had joined the team as a scout for the New England region.

=== Boston Bruins ===
After a season with the Stars, Weisbrod joined the scouting staff of the Boston Bruins on September 14, 2006, as a pro scout based out of Tampa, Florida. After two seasons scouting the professional leagues, Weisbrod became the Bruins' Director of Collegiate Scouting.

=== Calgary Flames ===
On June 27, 2011, Weisbrod was named the assistant general manager of player personnel of the Calgary Flames after winning a Stanley Cup ring with the Bruins. On December 12, 2013, he was relieved of his duties.

=== Vancouver Canucks ===
On July 7, 2014, Weisbrod was named vice president of player personnel for the Canucks. On August 4, 2015, he was promoted to assistant general manager. On December 5, 2021, the general manager, head coach, and Weisbrod were all fired due to the team's dismal record.

== Athletic Director ==
=== Ave Maria ===
On May 27, 2025, Weisbrod was named director of athletics for Ave Maria University.
