= Jeff Hackett =

Canadian ice hockey player

- Born: June 1, 1968 (age 58) London, Ontario, Canada
- Height: 6 ft 1 in (185 cm)
- Weight: 200 lb (91 kg; 14 st 4 lb)
- Position: Goaltender
- Caught: Left
- Played for: New York Islanders; San Jose Sharks; Chicago Blackhawks; Montreal Canadiens; Boston Bruins; Philadelphia Flyers
- National team: Canada
- NHL draft: 34th overall, 1987; New York Islanders
- Playing career: 1988–2004

Jeffrey David Hackett (born June 1, 1968) is a Canadian former professional ice hockey goaltender who played 15 seasons in the National Hockey League (NHL) with the New York Islanders, San Jose Sharks, Chicago Blackhawks, Montreal Canadiens, Boston Bruins and Philadelphia Flyers. He served as the Colorado Avalanche's goaltending coach for three seasons following his playing career.

== Playing career ==
Hackett grew up studying Tony Esposito and patterned his game after him. He was drafted by the New York Islanders in the second round of the 1987 NHL entry draft after playing in junior for the London Diamonds and the Oshawa Generals. Behind Billy Smith and Kelly Hrudey on the Islanders' goaltending depth chart, Hackett split his first two seasons with New York and the Springfield Indians of the American Hockey League (AHL). He led Springfield to a Calder Cup win in 1990 and was awarded the Jack A. Butterfield Trophy, annually given to the most valuable player of the playoffs.

The San Jose Sharks claimed him in the 1991 NHL Expansion Draft. During his first season in San Jose, Hackett was named team MVP for his play. However, after winning only two games in 1992-93, one of them a Sharks' record 57-save effort against the Kings, Hackett was dealt to the Chicago Blackhawks prior to 1993–94 and he backed up Ed Belfour for several seasons. His excellent play in 1996–97 allowed the Blackhawks to trade Belfour to San Jose mid-season on January 25, 1997. He signed a three year extension with Chicago on January 25, and in his only full season as Chicago's top goaltender was highlighted by a career-high eight shutouts.

A month into the season, Hackett was involved in a six-player trade which sent him to the Montreal Canadiens. He quickly became a fan favorite in Montreal as he recorded career highs in games played (63) and wins (26). After another solid season in 1999–2000, Hackett was limited to fifteen games in 2000–01 and eighteen games in 2001–02 due to a shoulder injury and lost the starter's job to 2002 Vezina Trophy winner José Théodore in the process. This signaled the end of his stint with Montreal as midway through 2002–03 he was involved in a three-way trade which sent him back to San Jose temporarily and then on to the Boston Bruins.

The Bruins, who had been looking for a number one goaltender, threw Hackett into that role. After shutting out Philadelphia in his Boston debut, Hackett played well until a broken finger caused him to miss time including the start of the Bruins' playoff series with New Jersey, forcing Boston to go with Steve Shields.

During the off-season, Hackett signed a two-year contract with the Philadelphia Flyers on the first day of free agency. He started his Flyers career by posting shutouts in his first two games, and accumulated a record of nine wins, two losses and six ties in his first seventeen games. However, in December, he lost six starts in a row and following a win in early January, lost his next two starts. He was diagnosed with positional vertigo and after a one-game rehab stint with the AHL's Philadelphia Phantoms on February 6, Hackett retired on February 9, 2004. Hackett finished his career after appearing in 500 NHL regular season games.

== Post-playing career ==
On July 12, 2006, Hackett was hired as the goaltending coach for the Colorado Avalanche. After three seasons in that role, Hackett was fired on June 3, 2009. Hackett resides in his hometown of London, Ontario and has turned his attention to minor hockey. His nephew is former NHL goaltender Matt Hackett.

== Awards ==
- 1986–87 - F. W. "Dinty" Moore Trophy (OHL)
- 1986–87 - Dave Pinkney Trophy (OHL)
- 1989–90 - Jack A. Butterfield Trophy (AHL)

== Career statistics ==
=== Regular season and playoffs ===
			Regular season									Playoffs
Season	Team	League	GP	W	L	T	MIN	GA	SO	GAA	SV%	GP	W	L	MIN	GA	SO	GAA	SV%
1984–85	London Diamonds	WOHL	18	—	—	—	1078	73	1	4.06	—	—	—	—	—	—	—	—	—
1985–86	London Diamonds	WOHL	19	—	—	—	1150	66	0	3.44	—	—	—	—	—	—	—	—	—
1986–87	Oshawa Generals	OHL	31	18	9	2	1672	85	2	3.05	—	15	8	7	895	40	0	2.68	—
1986–87	Oshawa Generals	MC	—	—	—	—	—	—	—	—	—	3	2	1	180	12	0	4.00	—
1987–88	Oshawa Generals	OHL	53	30	21	2	3165	205	0	3.89	—	7	3	4	438	31	0	4.24	—
1988–89	Springfield Indians	AHL	29	12	14	2	1677	116	0	4.15	.872	—	—	—	—	—	—	—	—
1988–89	New York Islanders	NHL	13	4	7	0	662	39	0	3.53	.881	—	—	—	—	—	—	—	—
1989–90	Springfield Indians	AHL	54	24	25	3	3045	187	1	3.68	.887	17	10	5	934	60	0	3.85	—
1990–91	New York Islanders	NHL	30	5	18	1	1508	91	0	3.62	.877	—	—	—	—	—	—	—	—
1991–92	San Jose Sharks	NHL	42	11	27	1	2314	148	0	3.84	.892	—	—	—	—	—	—	—	—
1992–93	San Jose Sharks	NHL	36	2	30	1	2000	176	0	5.28	.856	—	—	—	—	—	—	—	—
1993–94	Chicago Blackhawks	NHL	22	2	12	3	1084	62	0	3.43	.890	—	—	—	—	—	—	—	—
1994–95	Chicago Blackhawks	NHL	7	1	3	2	328	13	0	2.38	.913	2	0	0	26	1	0	2.30	.917
1995–96	Chicago Blackhawks	NHL	35	18	11	4	2000	80	4	2.40	.916	1	0	1	60	5	0	5.00	.865
1996–97	Chicago Blackhawks	NHL	41	19	18	4	2473	89	2	2.16	.927	6	2	4	345	25	0	4.34	.884
1997–98	Chicago Blackhawks	NHL	58	21	25	11	3441	126	8	2.20	.917	—	—	—	—	—	—	—	—
1998–99	Chicago Blackhawks	NHL	10	2	6	1	524	33	0	3.78	.871	—	—	—	—	—	—	—	—
1998–99	Montreal Canadiens	NHL	53	24	20	9	3091	117	5	2.27	.914	—	—	—	—	—	—	—	—
1999–00	Montreal Canadiens	NHL	56	23	25	7	3301	132	3	2.40	.914	—	—	—	—	—	—	—	—
2000–01	Montreal Canadiens	NHL	19	4	10	2	998	54	0	3.25	.887	—	—	—	—	—	—	—	—
2001–02	Montreal Canadiens	NHL	15	5	5	2	717	38	0	3.18	.904	—	—	—	—	—	—	—	—
2002–03	Montreal Canadiens	NHL	18	7	8	2	1063	45	0	2.54	.926	—	—	—	—	—	—	—	—
2002–03	Boston Bruins	NHL	18	8	9	0	991	53	1	3.21	.894	3	1	2	179	5	0	1.67	.934
2003–04	Philadelphia Flyers	NHL	27	10	10	6	1630	65	3	2.39	.905	—	—	—	—	—	—	—	—
2003–04	Philadelphia Phantoms	AHL	1	1	0	0	60	2	0	2.00	.889	—	—	—	—	—	—	—	—
NHL totals			500	166	244	56	28,125	1361	26	2.90	.902	12	3	7	610	36	0	3.54	.894

=== International ===
Year	Team	Event	GP	W	L	T	MIN	GA	SO	GAA	SV%
1988	Canada	WJC	DNP	—	—	—	—	—	—	—	—
1998	Canada	WC	2	0	1	1	120	9	0	4.50	.827
