= Don Barber =

Canadian ice hockey player

- Born: December 2, 1964 (age 61) Victoria, British Columbia, Canada
- Height: 6 ft 0 in (183 cm)
- Weight: 205 lb (93 kg; 14 st 9 lb)
- Position: Right wing
- Shot: Left
- Played for: Minnesota North Stars; Quebec Nordiques; Winnipeg Jets; San Jose Sharks
- NHL draft: 120th overall, 1983; Edmonton Oilers
- Playing career: 1982–1993

Donald Frederick Barber (born December 2, 1964) is a Canadian former professional National Hockey League forward. He played in 115 games with the Minnesota North Stars, Winnipeg Jets, Quebec Nordiques, and San Jose Sharks. He scored 25 goals and 32 assists. His son, Riley Barber, was drafted by the Washington Capitals in the 2012 NHL entry draft.

== Career statistics ==
			Regular season					Playoffs
Season	Team	League	GP	G	A	Pts	PIM	GP	G	A	Pts	PIM
1982–83	Kelowna Buckaroos	BCJHL	35	26	31	57	54	—	—	—	—	—
1983–84	St. Albert Saints	AJHL	53	42	38	80	74	—	—	—	—	—
1984–85	Bowling Green University	NCAA	39	15	12	27	44	—	—	—	—	—
1985–86	Bowling Green University	NCAA	35	21	22	43	64	—	—	—	—	—
1986–87	Bowling Green University	NCAA	43	29	34	63	107	—	—	—	—	—
1987–88	Bowling Green University	NCAA	38	18	47	65	60	—	—	—	—	—
1988–89	Minnesota North Stars	NHL	23	8	5	13	8	4	1	1	2	2
1988–89	Kalamazoo Wings	IHL	39	14	17	31	23	—	—	—	—	—
1989–90	Minnesota North Stars	NHL	44	15	19	34	32	7	3	3	6	8
1989–90	Kalamazoo Wings	IHL	10	4	4	8	38	—	—	—	—	—
1990–91	Minnesota North Stars	NHL	7	0	0	0	4	—	—	—	—	—
1990–91	Winnipeg Jets	NHL	16	1	2	3	14	—	—	—	—	—
1990–91	Moncton Hawks	AHL	38	17	21	38	32	9	4	6	10	8
1991–92	Winnipeg Jets	NHL	11	0	3	3	4	—	—	—	—	—
1991–92	Quebec Nordiques	NHL	2	0	0	0	0	—	—	—	—	—
1991–92	Halifax Citadels	AHL	25	12	10	22	8	—	—	—	—	—
1991–92	San Jose Sharks	NHL	12	1	3	4	2	—	—	—	—	—
1992–93	Kansas City Blades	IHL	9	3	1	4	4	—	—	—	—	—
NHL totals			115	25	32	57	64	11	4	4	8	10

== Awards and honours ==
Award	Year
CCHA All-Tournament Team	1988
