= J. F. Quintin =

Canadian ice hockey player

- Born: May 28, 1969 (age 56) Saint-Jean-sur-Richelieu, Quebec, Canada
- Height: 6 ft 1 in (185 cm)
- Weight: 180 lb (82 kg; 12 st 12 lb)
- Position: Left wing
- Shot: Left
- Played for: San Jose Sharks
- NHL draft: 75th overall, 1989; Minnesota North Stars
- Playing career: 1989–2003

Jean-François Quintin (born May 28, 1969) is a Canadian former professional ice hockey player. Quintin played for the San Jose Sharks of the National Hockey League between 1991 and 1993 and several minor league teams during his career, which lasted from 1989 to 2003.

== Playing career ==
Quintin was born in Saint-Jean-sur-Richelieu, Quebec. As a youth, he played in the 1981 Quebec International Pee-Wee Hockey Tournament with a minor ice hockey team from Saint-Jean-sur-Richelieu.

Quintin was drafted in the 1989 NHL entry draft, fourth round, 75th overall, by the Minnesota North Stars. His NHL career was brief, playing for the San Jose Sharks in only eight games in 1991–92 and 14 more in 1992–93. In those 22 games, he scored 5 goals and added 5 assists for 10 points.

== Career statistics ==
=== Regular season and playoffs ===
			Regular season					Playoffs
Season	Team	League	GP	G	A	Pts	PIM	GP	G	A	Pts	PIM
1984–85	Richelieu Riverains	QMAAA	3	0	0	0	0	6	4	3	7	0
1985–86	Richelieu Riverains	QMAAA	38	34	46	80	46	7	4	7	11	2
1986–87	Shawinigan Cataractes	QMJHL	42	1	9	10	17	10	0	2	2	2
1987–88	Shawinigan Cataractes	QMJHL	70	28	70	98	143	11	5	8	13	26
1988–89	Shawinigan Cataractes	QMJHL	69	52	100	152	105	10	9	15	24	16
1989–90	Kalamazoo Wings	IHL	68	20	18	38	38	10	8	4	12	14
1990–91	Kalamazoo Wings	IHL	78	31	43	74	64	9	1	5	6	11
1991–92	San Jose Sharks	NHL	8	3	0	3	0	—	—	—	—	—
1991–92	Kansas City Blades	IHL	21	4	6	10	29	13	2	10	12	29
1992–93	San Jose Sharks	NHL	14	2	5	7	4	—	—	—	—	—
1992–93	Kansas City Blades	IHL	64	20	29	49	169	11	2	1	3	16
1993–94	Kansas City Blades	IHL	41	14	19	33	117	—	—	—	—	—
1994–95	Kansas City Blades	IHL	63	23	35	58	130	19	2	9	11	57
1995–96	Kansas City Blades	IHL	77	26	35	61	158	5	0	3	3	20
1996–97	Kansas City Blades	IHL	21	3	5	8	49	2	0	0	0	2
1997–98	Kansas City Blades	IHL	79	22	37	59	126	11	3	6	9	34
1998–99	HDD Olimpija Ljubljana	SLO	19	14	16	30	—	—	—	—	—	—
1999–00	Star Bulls Rosenheim	DEL	55	13	35	48	197	—	—	—	—	—
2000–01	Moskitos Essen	DEL	54	15	32	47	217	—	—	—	—	—
2001–02	DEG Metro Stars	DEL	38	8	6	14	69	—	—	—	—	—
2002–03	DEG Metro Stars	DEL	47	12	20	32	94	5	1	1	2	26
IHL totals			512	163	227	390	880	80	18	38	56	183
NHL totals			22	5	5	10	4	—	—	—	—	—
