= Tyler Larter =

Canadian ice hockey player (born 1968)

- Born: March 12, 1968 (age 58) Charlottetown, PEI, Canada
- Height: 5 ft 10 in (178 cm)
- Weight: 185 lb (84 kg; 13 st 3 lb)
- Position: Centre
- Shot: Left
- Played for: Washington Capitals; VEU Feldkirch; HC Gherdëina; Durham Wasps; Whitley Warriors
- NHL draft: 78th overall, 1987; Washington Capitals
- Playing career: 1988–1994

Tyler Larter (born March 12, 1968) is a Canadian former professional ice hockey centre. He played one game in the National Hockey League (NHL) for the Washington Capitals during the 1989–90 season. The rest of his career, which lasted from 1988 to 1994, was spent in the minor leagues and then in Europe. Larter's one NHL game was on February 2, 1990 against the New York Islanders. He failed to register a point and went -1 in the game, taking two shots on goal. He was born in Charlottetown, Prince Edward Island.

== Career statistics ==
=== Regular season and playoffs ===
| | | | Regular season | | | | | Playoffs |
| Season | Team | League | GP | G | A | Pts | PIM | GP | G | A | Pts | PIM |
|---|---|---|---|---|---|---|---|---|---|---|---|---|
| 1983–84 | Charlottetown Tigers | MJrHL | 26 | 24 | 32 | 56 | — | — | — | — | — | — |
| 1984–85 | Sault Ste. Marie Greyhounds | OHL | 64 | 14 | 26 | 40 | 48 | 16 | 3 | 9 | 12 | 12 |
| 1985–86 | Sault Ste. Marie Greyhounds | OHL | 60 | 15 | 40 | 55 | 137 | — | — | — | — | — |
| 1986–87 | Sault Ste. Marie Greyhounds | OHL | 59 | 34 | 59 | 93 | 122 | 4 | 0 | 2 | 2 | 8 |
| 1987–88 | Sault Ste. Marie Greyhounds | OHL | 65 | 44 | 65 | 109 | 155 | 4 | 3 | 9 | 12 | 8 |
| 1988–89 | Baltimore Skipjacks | AHL | 71 | 9 | 19 | 28 | 189 | — | — | — | — | — |
| 1989–90 | Washington Capitals | NHL | 1 | 0 | 0 | 0 | 0 | — | — | — | — | — |
| 1989–90 | Baltimore Skipjacks | AHL | 79 | 31 | 36 | 67 | 104 | 12 | 5 | 6 | 11 | 57 |
| 1990–91 | Baltimore Skipjacks | AHL | 62 | 21 | 21 | 42 | 84 | 6 | 1 | 0 | 1 | 13 |
| 1991–92 | Moncton Hawks | AHL | 68 | 25 | 51 | 76 | 156 | 10 | 5 | 5 | 10 | 33 |
| 1991–92 | Kalamazoo Wings | IHL | 3 | 0 | 2 | 2 | 4 | — | — | — | — | — |
| 1992–93 | VEU Feldkirch | AUT | 39 | 16 | 25 | 41 | 135 | — | — | — | — | — |
| 1992–93 | HC Gherdëina | ITA | 3 | 2 | 2 | 4 | 2 | — | — | — | — | — |
| 1993–94 | Durham Wasps | BHL | 2 | 2 | 1 | 3 | 8 | — | — | — | — | — |
| 1993–94 | Whitley Warriors | BHL | 32 | 32 | 30 | 62 | 38 | 5 | 9 | 3 | 12 | 8 |
| AHL totals | | | 280 | 86 | 127 | 213 | 533 | 28 | 11 | 11 | 22 | 103 |
| NHL totals | | | 1 | 0 | 0 | 0 | 0 | — | — | — | — | — |

== See also ==
- List of players who played only one game in the NHL
