= Kansas City Blades =

Ice hockey team

- City: Kansas City, Missouri
- League: IHL
- Operated: 1990-2001
- Home arena: Kemper Arena
- Colors: Red, white, silver, black
- Owners: Russ and Diane Parker (1990-1996); Richard DeVos (1996-2001)

Franchise history
- 1974–1986: Toledo Goaldiggers
- 1990–2001: Kansas City Blades

The Kansas City Blades were a professional ice hockey team in the International Hockey League (IHL) from 1990 until 2001, when the league folded. The Blades were based in Kansas City, Missouri, at Kemper Arena.

== Team history ==
Russ and Diane Parker bought the dormant Toledo Goaldiggers franchise and moved it to Kansas City in 1990. Russ Parker conducted a contest to name the team and fans chose the name "Jazz". However, because the NBA's Utah Jazz were already using that name, Parker decided to use the second most popular name, "Blades." George Brett was one of a number of local residents that had submitted the name "Blades" during the naming contest.

Blades Logo 1998-2001

For the 1990-91 season, the Blades had partial NHL affiliations with the Edmonton Oilers and Hartford Whalers. From 1991 to 1996, they were the primary affiliate of the San Jose Sharks (coincidentally, the Blades moniker was the first-place finisher for the Sharks' "name the team" contest, but the ownership feared negative connotations and went with Sharks instead). In the team's second season, they won the Turner Cup, the only cup win of their history. However, the team would make it to the Turner Cup Finals again in 1995.

In the spring of 1996, the Parkers sold the team to Richard DeVos, who also owned stakes in the Grand Rapids Griffins and the Orlando Solar Bears. Under the DeVos ownership, the team would make many controversial changes on and off the ice. This coincided with a sharp decline in attendance.

The Sharks and Blades ended their association in the summer of 1996, leaving the Blades as an independent team again. During this period, many NHL teams severed ties with their IHL affiliates over concerns that the IHL was trying to challenge the NHL as the premier hockey league.

On July 9, 1998, the team unveiled a new logo and jersey design, keeping the same color scheme. The new logo was created by Sean Michael Edwards Design (SME) of New York City.

In 1999, DeVos attempted to move the team to Oklahoma City. A "Save the Blades" rally was held at a City Council meeting, and eventually Kansas City and DeVos signed a new contract to keep the team at Kemper Arena.

For the 2000-01 season, the Blades were the primary farm team of the Vancouver Canucks.

In June 2001, the IHL ceased operations. Many IHL teams moved to the American Hockey League. However, the Blades could not join the AHL because the league forebode a single owner from controlling multiple teams (unlike the IHL). Owner Dan DeVos chose to move the Grand Rapids Griffins to the AHL, ending the Blades and Orlando Solar Bears.

== Head coaches ==
- Doug Soetaert, 1990-91
- Kevin Constantine, 1991-93
- Jim Wiley, 1993-95
- Vasily Tikhonov, 1995-96
- Don Jackson, 1996-97
- Paul MacLean, 1997-2000
- Stan Smyl, 2000-01

== Mascots ==
From 1992-1997, the team's mascot was a chipmunk named Chilly. From 1997-2001, the mascot was a fierce red animal named Scrapper. Chilly would make occasional appearances at games after being replaced by Scrapper.

== Legacy ==
The Kansas City Outlaws of the United Hockey League played in the Kemper Arena for the 2004-2005 season before they folded. Since 2009, The Kansas City Mavericks of the ECHL play in nearby Independence, Missouri.

Several NHL exhibition games have also been held in Kansas City since the demise of the Blades. The St. Louis Blues have played six exhibition games in Kansas City, including games at Kemper arena in 2003 and 2005, games at Sprint Center (now T-Mobile Center) in 2008, 2014 and 2016, & 2021 and 2022 at Cable Dahmer Arena.

In 2018, the San Jose Barracuda, affiliate of the Blades' former partners the San Jose Sharks, held a Blades tribute night. The team wore Blades jerseys and changed their name/logo on social media to the Blades.

In 2021, the Kansas City Mavericks held a Blades Tribute Night. Festivities included the team wearing Blades-style jerseys and logos, appearances by former Blades GM Doug Soetart and Blades captain Gary Emmons, and displaying the Blades 1991 Turner Cup champions banner.

== Notable alumni ==
- Jan Čaloun
- Jon Casey
- Shean Donovan
- Gary Emmons
- Wade Flaherty
- Bryan Fogarty
- Arturs Irbe
- Claude Julien
- Viktor Kozlov
- Jim Kyte
- Patrick Lalime
- Jeff Odgers
- Sandis Ozolinsh
- Michal Pivonka
- Brent Sopel
- Dean Sylvester
- Ray Whitney
