= 1991–92 Pittsburgh Penguins season =

NHL team season (won Cup)

1991–92 Pittsburgh Penguins
- Stanley Cup champions
- Wales Conference champions
- Division: 3rd Patrick
- Conference: 4th Wales
- 1991–92 record: 39–32–9
- Home record: 21–13–6
- Road record: 18–19–3
- Goals for: 343
- Goals against: 308

Team information
- General manager: Craig Patrick
- Coach: Scotty Bowman
- Captain: Mario Lemieux
- Alternate captains: Bob Errey; Kevin Stevens; Bryan Trottier
- Arena: Civic Arena
- Average attendance: 15,993

Team leaders
- Goals: Kevin Stevens (54)
- Assists: Mario Lemieux (87)
- Points: Mario Lemieux (131)
- Penalty minutes: Kevin Stevens (252)
- Plus/minus: Larry Murphy (+33)
- Wins: Tom Barrasso (25)
- Goals against average: Tom Barrasso (3.53)

The 1991–92 Pittsburgh Penguins season was the Penguins' 25th season in the National Hockey League (NHL). The team was coming off of its first-ever Stanley Cup victory in 1990–91, as they defeated the Chicago Black Hawks in the Final in six games. The Penguins, along with the Detroit Red Wings and New York Rangers, had five 30-goal scorers. Seven players and three off-ice staff members from the 1991–92 team's year-end roster have been elected to the Hockey Hall of Fame.

== Off-season ==
In the off-season, Head Coach Bob Johnson was diagnosed with brain cancer, forcing him to step down, where the Penguins brought in former St. Louis Blues, Montreal Canadiens, and Buffalo Sabres head coach Scotty Bowman to replace Johnson. Bowman had previously led the Canadiens to five Stanley Cup championships in the 1970s. Johnson lost his battle to cancer on November 26, 1991, and the Penguins honored him by wearing a patch on the left sleeve of their jersey with his nickname "Badger" written on it along with his birth year and death year.

== Regular season ==
Pittsburgh started the season off very well, and through their first 38 games, they had a record of 22–12–4, earning 48 points and fighting with the Washington Capitals and New York Rangers for first in the Division. The team, along with Mario Lemieux, who missed time due to a back injury, would slump in their next 24 games, going 5–15–4 to slide down to .500 and battling with the New York Islanders and Philadelphia Flyers for the final playoff position in the Division. The Penguins, facing losing defenseman Paul Coffey as a free agent after the season, would deal him to the Los Angeles Kings in a move that looked like they were giving up for the season, however, they would make a move to bring some more grit to the team, acquiring Rick Tocchet, Kjell Samuelsson, Ken Wregget, and a 1993 conditional third-round pick from Philadelphia for Mark Recchi, Brian Benning, and a 1992 first-round pick. Pittsburgh had a 12–5–1 record to close out the season, finishing in third place in the Division and making the playoffs for the second-straight season.

Mario Lemieux led the club offensively, despite missing 16 games to injuries, as he earned an NHL-high 131 points from 44 goals and 87 assists to win the Art Ross Trophy. Kevin Stevens led the team with 54 goals and finished second in League scoring behind Lemieux with 123 points. Joe Mullen also had a solid season, as he scored 42 goals and earned 87 points, while Jaromír Jágr continued to develop, as he recorded 69 points in 70 games. Larry Murphy put up a defense-high 77 points in his first full season with the Penguins.

In goal, Tom Barrasso played the majority of the games, earning a team high 25 victories, along with a team best 3.53 goals against average (GAA), while earning a shutout for the club.

Offensively, the Penguins led the NHL in scoring, with 343 goals for.

On October 29, 1991, the Penguins were shut out at home 8–0 by the Washington Capitals. It was the first time the Penguins had been shut-out in a regular season game since January 2, 1989, when they coincidentally lost 8–0 on the road also to the Capitals. Prior to their home loss against the Caps, the Penguins had gone 211 consecutive regular season games without being shut-out.

=== Sale to Baldwin and Belzberg ===
Although owner Edward DeBartolo, Sr. had enjoyed his team winning the Stanley Cup, the elder DeBartolo sought to sell the Penguins, but did not have a deal in place prior to the start of the season. Minnesota North Stars co-owners Howard Baldwin and Morris Belzberg had sold their stakes in that team to fellow co-owner Norman Green following a dispute between the owners, with Baldwin having sold his interest in August and Belzberg selling off in October. Baldwin and Belzberg partnered together to purchase the Penguins, and the NHL approved the deal on November 18, 1991.

=== Season standings ===
Patrick Division
	GP	W	L	T	GF	GA	Pts
**New York Rangers**	**80**	**50**	**25**	**5**	**321**	**246**	**105**
**Washington Capitals**	**80**	**45**	**27**	**8**	**330**	**257**	**98**
**Pittsburgh Penguins**	**80**	**39**	**32**	**9**	**343**	**308**	**87**
**New Jersey Devils**	**80**	**38**	**31**	**11**	**289**	**259**	**87**
New York Islanders	80	34	35	11	291	299	79
Philadelphia Flyers	80	32	37	11	252	273	75

Wales Conference
R		Div	GP	W	L	T	GF	GA	Pts
1	**p** – **New York Rangers**	**PAT**	**80**	**50**	**25**	**5**	**321**	**246**	**105**
2	**Washington Capitals**	**PAT**	**80**	**45**	**27**	**8**	**330**	**257**	**98**
3	**Montreal Canadiens**	**ADM**	**80**	**41**	**28**	**11**	**267**	**207**	**93**
4	**Pittsburgh Penguins**	**PAT**	**80**	**39**	**32**	**9**	**343**	**308**	**87**
5	**New Jersey Devils**	**PAT**	**80**	**38**	**31**	**11**	**289**	**259**	**87**
6	**Boston Bruins**	**ADM**	**80**	**36**	**32**	**12**	**270**	**275**	**84**
7	New York Islanders	PAT	80	34	35	11	291	299	79
8	Philadelphia Flyers	PAT	80	32	37	11	252	273	75
9	**Buffalo Sabres**	**ADM**	**80**	**31**	**37**	**12**	**289**	**299**	**74**
10	**Hartford Whalers**	**ADM**	**80**	**26**	**41**	**13**	**247**	**283**	**65**
11	Quebec Nordiques	ADM	80	20	48	12	255	318	52

Divisions: ADM – Adams, PAT – Patrick

p – Clinched Presidents' Trophy
bold – Qualified for playoffs

== Schedule and results ==
1991–92 regular season
October: 5–5–2 (home: 2–3–2; road: 3–2–0), 12 points

#	Oct	Time (ET)	Visitor	Score	Home	Location	Record	Points
1	4	7:35 PM	Pittsburgh Penguins	5–4	Buffalo Sabres	Buffalo Memorial Auditorium	1–0–0	2
2	6	7:35 PM	Philadelphia Flyers	2–2 OT	Pittsburgh Penguins	Civic Arena	1–0–1	3
3	10	7:35 PM	Pittsburgh Penguins	6–3	Philadelphia Flyers	The Spectrum	2–0–1	5
4	12	7:45 PM	Pittsburgh Penguins	1–4	New Jersey Devils	Brendan Byrne Arena	2–1–1	5
5	15	7:35 PM	Pittsburgh Penguins	7–6 OT	New York Islanders	Nassau Veterans Memorial Coliseum	3–1–1	7
6	17	7:35 PM	New York Islanders	5–8	Pittsburgh Penguins	Civic Arena	4–1–1	9
7	19	7:35 PM	New York Rangers	5–4	Pittsburgh Penguins	Civic Arena	4–2–1	9
8	22	7:35 PM	Chicago Blackhawks	4–4 OT	Pittsburgh Penguins	Civic Arena	4–2–2	10
9	24	7:35 PM	New Jersey Devils	4–2	Pittsburgh Penguins	Civic Arena	4–3–2	10
10	26	8:05 PM	Pittsburgh Penguins	1–4	Montreal Canadiens	Montreal Forum	4–4–2	10
11	29	7:35 PM	Washington Capitals	8–0	Pittsburgh Penguins	Civic Arena	4–5–2	10
12	31	7:35 PM	Minnesota North Stars	1–8	Pittsburgh Penguins	Civic Arena	5–5–2	12

November: 8–3–2 (home: 4–1–2; road: 4–2–0), 18 points

#	Nov	Time (ET)	Visitor	Score	Home	Location	Record	Points
13	2	7:35 PM	Hartford Whalers	6–5	Pittsburgh Penguins	Civic Arena	5–6–2	12
14	5	7:35 PM	Boston Bruins	5–5 OT	Pittsburgh Penguins	Civic Arena	5–6–3	13
15	8	8:35 PM	Pittsburgh Penguins	3–1	Winnipeg Jets	Winnipeg Arena	6–6–3	15
16	9	8:05 PM	Pittsburgh Penguins	3–2	Minnesota North Stars	Met Center	7–6–3	17
17	11	7:35 PM	Pittsburgh Penguins	1–3	New York Rangers	Madison Square Garden (IV)	7–7–3	17
18	13	7:35 PM	Edmonton Oilers	4–5 OT	Pittsburgh Penguins	Civic Arena	8–7–3	19
19	15	8:05 PM	Pittsburgh Penguins	2–6	Washington Capitals	Capital Centre	8–8–3	19
20	18	7:35 PM	Pittsburgh Penguins	7–3	Quebec Nordiques	Colisée de Québec	9–8–3	21
21	20	7:35 PM	Philadelphia Flyers	2–5	Pittsburgh Penguins	Civic Arena	10–8–3	23
22	23	7:35 PM	New York Islanders	2–2 OT	Pittsburgh Penguins	Civic Arena	10–8–4	24
23	27	7:35 PM	New Jersey Devils	4–8	Pittsburgh Penguins	Civic Arena	11–8–4	26
24	29	1:05 PM	Pittsburgh Penguins	9–3	Philadelphia Flyers	The Spectrum	12–8–4	28
25	30	7:35 PM	Philadelphia Flyers	1–5	Pittsburgh Penguins	Civic Arena	13–8–4	30

December: 9–5–0 (home: 3–3–0; road: 6–2–0), 18 points

#	Dec	Time (ET)	Visitor	Score	Home	Location	Record	Points
26	3	9:35 PM	Pittsburgh Penguins	3–5	Edmonton Oilers	Northlands Coliseum	13–9–4	30
27	5	10:35 PM	Pittsburgh Penguins	8–0	San Jose Sharks	Cow Palace	14–9–4	32
28	7	8:35 PM	Pittsburgh Penguins	1–6	St. Louis Blues	St. Louis Arena	14–10–4	32
29	10	7:35 PM	New York Rangers	3–5	Pittsburgh Penguins	Civic Arena	15–10–4	34
30	13	7:45 PM	Pittsburgh Penguins	4–3	New Jersey Devils	Brendan Byrne Arena	16–10–4	36
31	14	7:35 PM	Washington Capitals	7–2	Pittsburgh Penguins	Civic Arena	16–11–4	36
32	17	7:35 PM	San Jose Sharks	2–10	Pittsburgh Penguins	Civic Arena	17–11–4	38
33	19	7:35 PM	Pittsburgh Penguins	6–4	Boston Bruins	Boston Garden	18–11–4	40
34	21	7:35 PM	New York Rangers	7–5	Pittsburgh Penguins	Civic Arena	18–12–4	40
35	23	7:35 PM	Pittsburgh Penguins	6–3	New York Islanders	Nassau Veterans Memorial Coliseum	19–12–4	42
36	26	7:35 PM	Toronto Maple Leafs	1–12	Pittsburgh Penguins	Civic Arena	20–12–4	44
37	28	7:35 PM	Pittsburgh Penguins	6–2	Washington Capitals	Capital Centre	21–12–4	46
38	29	7:35 PM	Pittsburgh Penguins	6–3	New York Rangers	Madison Square Garden (IV)	22–12–4	48
39	31	6:05 PM	New Jersey Devils	7–4	Pittsburgh Penguins	Civic Arena	22–13–4	48

January: 3–7–1 (home: 1–4–0; road: 2–3–0), 7 points

#	Jan	Time (ET)	Visitor	Score	Home	Location	Record	Points
40	2	7:45 PM	Pittsburgh Penguins	0–4	New Jersey Devils	Brendan Byrne Arena	22–14–4	48
41	4	1:35 PM	Winnipeg Jets	2–3	Pittsburgh Penguins	Civic Arena	23–14–4	50
42	7	7:35 PM	Los Angeles Kings	5–2	Pittsburgh Penguins	Civic Arena	23–15–4	50
43	10	9:35 PM	Pittsburgh Penguins	5–7	Calgary Flames	Olympic Saddledome	23–16–4	50
44	12	5:05 PM	Pittsburgh Penguins	4–3	Vancouver Canucks	Pacific Coliseum	24–16–4	52
45	16	7:35 PM	Pittsburgh Penguins	3–3 OT	Detroit Red Wings	Joe Louis Arena	24–16–5	53
46	23	7:35 PM	Buffalo Sabres	5–4 OT	Pittsburgh Penguins	Civic Arena	24–17–5	53
47	25	2:05 PM	Pittsburgh Penguins	5–3	New York Islanders	Nassau Veterans Memorial Coliseum	25–17–5	55
48	26	12:05 PM	Pittsburgh Penguins	4–6	Washington Capitals	Capital Centre	25–18–5	55
49	28	7:35 PM	Winnipeg Jets	4–0	Pittsburgh Penguins	Civic Arena	25–19–5	55
50	30	7:35 PM	New York Islanders	8–5	Pittsburgh Penguins	Civic Arena	25–20–5	55

February: 3–7–3 (home: 3–2–2; road: 0–5–1), 9 points

#	Feb	Time (ET)	Visitor	Score	Home	Location	Record	Points
51	1	1:35 PM	St. Louis Blues	1–4	Pittsburgh Penguins	Civic Arena	26–20–5	57
52	3	7:35 PM	Detroit Red Wings	4–4 OT	Pittsburgh Penguins	Civic Arena	26–20–6	58
53	5	7:35 PM	Pittsburgh Penguins	3–4	New York Rangers	Madison Square Garden (IV)	26–21–6	58
54	8	2:05 PM	Los Angeles Kings	4–3	Pittsburgh Penguins	Civic Arena	26–22–6	58
55	9	1:35 PM	Pittsburgh Penguins	3–6	Boston Bruins	Boston Garden	26–23–6	58
56	15	8:05 PM	Pittsburgh Penguins	2–5	Minnesota North Stars	Met Center	26–24–6	58
57	16	7:05 PM	Pittsburgh Penguins	3–3 OT	Philadelphia Flyers	The Spectrum	26–24–7	59
58	18	7:35 PM	Toronto Maple Leafs	1–7	Pittsburgh Penguins	Civic Arena	27–24–7	61
59	20	7:35 PM	Quebec Nordiques	4–4 OT	Pittsburgh Penguins	Civic Arena	27–24–8	62
60	22	8:05 PM	Pittsburgh Penguins	1–2	Montreal Canadiens	Montreal Forum	27–25–8	62
61	25	7:35 PM	Pittsburgh Penguins	3–5	Washington Capitals	Capital Centre	27–26–8	62
62	27	7:35 PM	Hartford Whalers	8–4	Pittsburgh Penguins	Civic Arena	27–27–8	62
63	29	1:35 PM	Buffalo Sabres	2–5	Pittsburgh Penguins	Civic Arena	28–27–8	64

March: 10–3–1 (home: 7–0–0; road: 3–3–1), 21 points

#	Mar	Time (ET)	Visitor	Score	Home	Location	Record	Points
64	3	9:35 PM	Pittsburgh Penguins	6–3	Calgary Flames	Olympic Saddledome	29–27–8	66
65	6	10:35 PM	Pittsburgh Penguins	7–3	San Jose Sharks	Cow Palace	30–27–8	68
66	7	10:35 PM	Pittsburgh Penguins	3–5	Los Angeles Kings	Great Western Forum	30–28–8	68
67	10	7:35 PM	Calgary Flames	2–5	Pittsburgh Penguins	Civic Arena	31–28–8	70
68	12	7:35 PM	New York Islanders	4–6	Pittsburgh Penguins	Civic Arena	32–28–8	72
69	14	8:05 PM	Pittsburgh Penguins	3–6	Toronto Maple Leafs	Maple Leaf Gardens	32–29–8	72
70	15	8:35 PM	Pittsburgh Penguins	4–3	Chicago Blackhawks	Chicago Stadium	33–29–8	74
71	17	7:35 PM	Edmonton Oilers	5–6	Pittsburgh Penguins	Civic Arena	34–29–8	76
72	19	7:35 PM	Quebec Nordiques	3–6	Pittsburgh Penguins	Civic Arena	35–29–8	78
73	22	7:05 PM	Pittsburgh Penguins	2–2 OT	Hartford Whalers	Hartford Civic Center	35–29–9	79
74	24	7:35 PM	Pittsburgh Penguins	3–4	Detroit Red Wings	Joe Louis Arena	35–30–9	79
75	26	7:35 PM	Vancouver Canucks	3–7	Pittsburgh Penguins	Civic Arena	36–30–9	81
76	28	8:05 PM	Montreal Canadiens	3–6	Pittsburgh Penguins	Civic Arena	37–30–9	83
77	31	7:35 PM	Philadelphia Flyers	5–6	Pittsburgh Penguins	Civic Arena	38–30–9	85

April: 1–2–0 (home: 1–0–0; road: 0–2–0), 2 points

#	Apr	Time (ET)	Visitor	Score	Home	Location	Record	Points
78	13	7:45 PM	Pittsburgh Penguins	1–5	New Jersey Devils	Brendan Byrne Arena	38–31–9	85
79	15	7:35 PM	Washington Capitals	1–4	Pittsburgh Penguins	Civic Arena	39–31–9	87
80	16	7:35 PM	Pittsburgh Penguins	1–7	New York Rangers	Madison Square Garden (IV)	39–32–9	87

Legend: Win (2 points) Loss (0 points) Tie (1 point)

== Playoffs ==
=== Division Semifinals ===
In the playoffs, the Penguins would open up against the Washington Capitals, who they defeated in the second round in the previous season en route to the Stanley Cup championship. The Capitals finished the season 11 points ahead of Pittsburgh, and had home ice for the series. Washington would open the series up with two solid victories at home, however, Pittsburgh responded with a game three victory to cut the Caps series lead in half. Washington would demolish the Penguins in the fourth game, going up 3–1 in the series, and returning home in hopes of closing it out. Pittsburgh had no trouble beating the Capitals in game five, winning 5–2, and evened the series up at home in game six with a 6–4 win. In the seventh and deciding game of the series, Tom Barrasso would step up, allowing only one goal as Pittsburgh won the final game by a 3–1 scoreline to upset the favored Capitals and complete the series comeback.

=== Division Finals ===
Up next was the Patrick Division-winning New York Rangers, who had 18 more points than Pittsburgh during the regular season. Pittsburgh would surprise the Rangers with a 4–2 victory in the opening game, however, New York tied the series up in the second game. The Rangers took a 2–1 series lead with 6–5 overtime victory. The Penguins would tie the series up with their own overtime win in the fourth game, as the series returned to New York for the fifth game. Pittsburgh would hang on for a 3–2 victory in the fifth game, and close out the series at home with a 5–1 win, to upset the Rangers, and return to the Conference Finals.

=== Conference Finals ===
The Penguins next opponent was the Boston Bruins, who they defeated in the playoffs the previous year in six games. The Bruins had 84 points during the regular season, three less than the Penguins, giving Pittsburgh home ice advantage. The Pens opened up the series with a 4–3 overtime win, then went up 2–0 in the series with a 5–2 win, as the series would shift to Boston. The Penguins stayed hot, winning Games 3 and 4 by identical 5–1 scorelines, to sweep the Bruins, and reach the Stanley Cup Final for the second-straight season.

=== Stanley Cup Final ===
Pittsburgh had to defeat the Chicago Blackhawks in hopes of a second-straight Stanley Cup. The Hawks finished the season with 87 points, the same amount as the Penguins, but since the Pens had more wins than the Hawks (39 to 36), Pittsburgh would have home ice in the Finals. Chicago had defeated the St. Louis Blues, Detroit Red Wings and Edmonton Oilers en route to the Finals, entering the series with an NHL playoff record 11-game winning streak. The Penguins, however, were on their own seven-game winning streak, as they won the last three games of the Rangers series and four in the Boston series. Pittsburgh stayed hot, with a 5–4 victory in game one, and then defeated Chicago 3–1 in game two to go up 2–0 as the series would move to Chicago Stadium. The Penguins would then shut-out Chicago 1–0 in the third game to win their tenth in a row, with Pittsburgh finishing off the sweep after a 6–5 game four win, tying the Blackhawks' NHL playoff record with their own 11th-straight win as they would become the first team since the 1986–87 and 1987–88 Edmonton Oilers to win back-to-back Stanley Cups. Mario Lemieux won the Conn Smythe Trophy for the second straight year, as he recorded a League-high 34 points in just 15 playoff games.

=== Playoff log ===
1992 Stanley Cup playoffs
Patrick Division semifinals vs No. 2 Washington Capitals: 4–3 (home: 2–1; road: 2–2)

#	Date	Visitor	Score	Home	OT	PIT goals	WSH goals	Decision	Attendance	Series	Recap
1	April 19	Pittsburgh	1–3	Washington		Loney	Bondra, Druce, Bondra	Barrasso (0–1)	16,689	0–1	
2	April 21	Pittsburgh	2–6	Washington		Murphy, Stevens	Khristich, Bondra, Pivonka, Cote, Ciccarelli, Miller	Barrasso (0–2)	17,453	0–2	
3	April 23	Washington	4–6	Pittsburgh		Bourque, Mullen, Jagr, Lemieux (2), Lemieux (en)	Hatcher, Khristich, Iafrate, Hatcher	Barrasso (1–2)	16,164	1–2	
4	April 25	Washington	7–2	Pittsburgh		Lemieux, Trottier	Krygier, Ciccarelli, Kristich, Ciccarelli, Bondra, Ciccarelli	Barrasso (1–3)	16,164	1–3	
5	April 27	Pittsburgh	5–2	Washington		Trottier, Errey, Murphy, Jagr, Errey (en)	Krygier, Iafrate	Barrasso (2–3)	17,621	2–3	
6	April 29	Washington	4–6	Pittsburgh		Stevens (2), Mullen, Bourque, Lemieux (2)	Hunter, Bondra (2), Iafrate	Barrasso (3–3)	16,164	3–3	
7	May 1	Pittsburgh	3–1	Washington		Lemieux, Jagr, Mullen (en)	Iafrate	Barrasso (4–3)	17,783	4–3	

Patrick Division finals vs No. 1 New York Rangers: 4–2 (home: 2–1; road: 2–1)

#	Date	Visitor	Score	Home	OT	PIT goals	NYR goals	Decision	Attendance	Series	Recap
1	May 3	Pittsburgh	4–2	N.Y. Rangers		Loney, Murphy, Stevens, Francis	King, Amonte	Barrasso (5–3)	17,744	1–0	
2	May 5	Pittsburgh	2–4	N.Y. Rangers		Stevens, Murphy	Leetch, Beukeboom, King, Beukeboom (en)	Barrasso (5–4)	18,200	1–1	
3	May 7	N.Y. Rangers	6–5	Pittsburgh	1:29	Stevens, Francis (2), Murphy, Stevens	Graves, Kerr, Nemchinov, Gartner, Erixon, King	Barrasso (5–5)	16,164	1–2	
4	May 9	N.Y. Rangers	4–5	Pittsburgh	2:47	Needham, Francis (2), Loney, Francis	Gilhen, Amonte, Messier (2)	Barrasso (6–5)	16,164	2–2	
5	May 11	Pittsburgh	3–2	N.Y. Rangers		Tocchet, Jagr (2)	Turcotte, Gartner	Barrasso (7–5)	18,200	3–2	
6	May 13	N.Y. Rangers	1–5	Pittsburgh		Tocchet, Jagr, McEachern, Tocchet (en), Francis (en)	Weight	Barrasso (8–5)	16,164	4–2	

Wales Conference finals vs No. 2 Boston Bruins: 4–0 (home: 2–0; road: 2–0)

#	Date	Visitor	Score	Home	OT	PIT goals	BOS goals	Decision	Attendance	Series	Recap
1	May 17	Boston	3–4	Pittsburgh	9:44	Trottier, Callander, McEachern, Jagr	Sweeney, Donato, Wesley	Barrasso (9–5)	16,164	1–0	
2	May 19	Boston	2–5	Pittsburgh		Loney, Jagr, Tocchet, Lemieux, Lemieux (en)	Murray, Oates	Barrasso (10–5)	16,164	2–0	
3	May 21	Pittsburgh	5–1	Boston		Stevens (3),, Trottier, Stevens	Juneau	Barrasso (11–5)	14,448	3–0	
4	May 23	Pittsburgh	5–1	Boston		Jagr, Lemieux, Stanton, Lemieux, Michayluk	Leach	Barrasso (12–5)	14,448	4–0	

Stanley Cup Finals vs No. 2 Chicago Blackhawks: 4–0 (home: 2–0; road: 2–0)

#	Date	Visitor	Score	Home	OT	PIT goals	CHI goals	Decision	Attendance	Series	Recap
1	May 26	Chicago	4–5	Pittsburgh		Bourque, Tocchet, Lemieux, Jagr, Lemieux	Chelios, Goulet, Graham, Sutter	Barrasso (13–5)	16,164	1–0	
2	May 28	Chicago	1–3	Pittsburgh		Errey, Lemieux (2)	Marchment	Barrasso (14–5)	16,164	2–0	
3	May 30	Pittsburgh	1–0	Chicago		Stevens		Barrasso (15–5)	18,472	3–0	
4	June 1	Pittsburgh	6–5	Chicago		Jagr, Stevens, Lemieux, Tocchet, Murphy, Francis	Graham (3), Roenick (2)	Barrasso (16–5)	18,472	4–0	

Legend: Win Loss

- Scorer of game-winning goal in italics

== Player statistics ==
Skaters

Regular season
Player	GP	G	A	Pts	+/−	PIM
Mario Lemieux	64	44	87	131	27	94
Kevin Stevens	80	54	69	123	8	254
Joe Mullen	77	42	45	87	12	30
Larry Murphy	77	21	56	77	33	48
Mark Recchi^{‡}	58	33	37	70	–16	78
Jaromir Jagr	70	32	37	69	12	34
Paul Coffey^{‡}	54	10	54	64	4	62
Ron Francis	70	21	33	54	–7	30
Bob Errey	78	19	16	35	1	119
Rick Tocchet^{†}	19	14	16	30	12	49
Bryan Trottier	63	11	18	29	–11	54
Troy Loney	76	10	16	26	–5	127
Phil Bourque	58	10	16	26	–6	58
Gordie Roberts	73	2	22	24	19	87
Jiri Hrdina	56	3	13	16	4	16
Ulf Samuelsson	62	1	14	15	2	206
Ken Priestlay	49	2	8	10	5	4
Paul Stanton	54	2	8	10	–8	62
Grant Jennings	53	4	5	9	–1	104
Jamie Leach	38	5	4	9	–2	8
Jim Paek	49	1	7	8	0	36
Peter Taglianetti	44	1	3	4	7	57
Shawn McEachern	15	0	4	4	1	0
Kjell Samuelsson^{†}	20	1	2	3	0	34
Jeff Chychrun^{†}	17	0	1	1	–8	35
Gord Dineen	1	0	0	0	–2	0
Glenn Mulvenna	1	0	0	0	–1	2
Jay Caufield	50	0	0	0	–6	175
Jeff Daniels	2	0	0	0	0	0
Todd Nelson	1	0	0	0	0	0
Total		343	591	934	—	1,863

Playoffs
Player	GP	G	A	Pts	+/−	PIM
Mario Lemieux	15	16	18	34	6	2
Kevin Stevens	21	13	15	28	2	28
Ron Francis	21	8	19	27	8	6
Jaromir Jagr	21	11	13	24	4	6
Rick Tocchet	14	6	13	19	0	24
Larry Murphy	21	6	10	16	–4	19
Shawn McEachern	19	2	7	9	6	4
Troy Loney	21	4	5	9	1	32
Paul Stanton	21	1	7	8	6	42
Bryan Trottier	21	4	3	7	0	8
Phil Bourque	21	3	4	7	–1	25
Joe Mullen	9	3	1	4	–4	4
Jim Paek	19	0	4	4	10	6
Jock Callander	12	1	3	4	0	2
Kjell Samuelsson	15	0	3	3	6	12
Bob Errey	14	3	0	3	0	10
Jiri Hrdina	20	0	2	2	–6	16
Ulf Samuelsson	21	0	2	2	7	39
Gordie Roberts	19	0	2	2	–1	32
Dave Michayluk	7	1	1	2	1	0
Mike Needham	5	1	0	1	0	2
Grant Jennings	10	0	0	0	–9	12
Jay Caufield	5	0	0	0	0	2
Total		83	132	215	—	333

Goaltenders

Regular Season
Player	GP	TOI	W	L	T	GA	GAA	SA	SV%	SO	G	A	PIM
Tom Barrasso	57	3329:29	25	22	9	196	3.53	1702	0.885	1	0	4	30
Wendell Young	18	837:40	7	6	0	53	3.80	476	0.889	0	0	0	0
Ken Wregget^{†}	9	448:10	5	3	0	31	4.15	202	0.847	0	0	0	2
Frank Pietrangelo^{‡}	5	225:19	2	1	0	20	5.33	130	0.846	0	0	0	0
Total		4840:38	39	32	9	300	3.72	2510	0.880	1	0	4	32

Playoffs
Player	GP	TOI	W	L	T	GA	GAA	SA	SV%	SO	G	A	PIM
Tom Barrasso	21	1232:59	16	5	0	58	3.00	622	0.907	1	0	2	4
Ken Wregget	1	40:00	0	0	0	4	1.55	16	0.750	0	0	0	0
Total		1272:59	16	5	0	62	2.92	638	0.903	1	0	2	4

^{†}Denotes player spent time with another team before joining the Penguins. Stats reflect time with the Penguins only.
^{‡}Denotes player was traded mid-season. Stats reflect time with the Penguins only.

== Awards and records ==
- Mario Lemieux became the first person to score 900 points for the Penguins. He did so in a 5–6 loss to Hartford on November 2.
- Mario Lemieux became the first person to score 400 goals for the Penguins. He did so in a 3–6 loss to Toronto on March 14.
- Mario Lemieux became the first person to score 1000 points for the Penguins. He did so in a 3–4 loss to Detroit on March 24.
- Mario Lemieux became the first person to score 600 assists for the Penguins. He did so in a 7–3 win over Vancouver on March 26.
- Paul Coffey established franchise records for goals (108) assists (332) and points (440) by a defenseman. He had set record for each category within the previous two seasons.

=== Awards ===
Player	Award
Phil Bourque	Edward J. DeBartolo Community Service Award
Mario Lemieux	Bowser Pontiac Leading Point Scorer Award; Booster Club Award; Foodland Most Valuable Player Award; Art Ross Trophy; NHL Second All-Star Team; Conn Smythe Trophy
Troy Loney	Edward J. DeBartolo Community Service Award
Joe Mullen	Unsung Hero Award; Pittsburgh Penguins Masterton Nominee; Murray Hill Jewelers Player's Player Award
Larry Murphy	Baz Bastien Memorial "Good Guy" Award
Jim Paek	Michel Briere Memorial Rookie of the Year Award
Kevin Stevens	NHL First All-Star Team

== Transactions ==
The Penguins were involved in the following transactions during the 1991–92 season:

=== Trades ===
February 19, 1992	To Los Angeles Kings Paul Coffey	To Pittsburgh Penguins Brian Benning; Jeff Chychrun; 1992 1st round pick
February 19, 1992	To Philadelphia Flyers Brian Benning; Mark Recchi; 1992 1st round pick	To Pittsburgh Penguins Kjell Samuelsson; Rick Tocchet; Ken Wregget; 1993 conditional 3rd round pick
March 10, 1992	To Quebec Nordiques rights to Scott Young	To Pittsburgh Penguins Bryan Fogarty
March 10, 1992	To Hartford Whalers Frank Pietrangelo	To Pittsburgh Penguins 1994 3rd round pick 1994 7th round pick

=== Free agents ===
Player	Acquired from	Lost to	Date
Kim Issel		Vancouver Canucks	August 1, 1991
Barry Pederson		Hartford Whalers	September 5, 1991

=== Signings ===
Player	Date	Contract terms
Bryan Trottier	August 19, 1991	1-year contract
Ron Francis	October 25, 1991	Multi-year contract

=== Other ===
Name	Date	Details
Bob Johnson	October 1, 1991	Replaced as head coach due to medical condition
Pierre McGuire	October 1, 1991	Hired as assistant coach
Scotty Bowman	October 1, 1991	Hired as interim head coach
Howard Baldwin	November 19, 1991	Transfer of ownership
Morris Belzberg	November 19, 1991	Transfer of ownership
Tom Ruta	November 19, 1991	Transfer of ownership
Craig Patrick	January 30, 1992	Re-signed as GM and VP to a 5-year contract
Peter Taglianetti	June 18, 1992	Lost in expansion draft to Tampa Bay Lightning
Wendell Young	June 18, 1992	Lost in expansion draft to Tampa Bay Lightning

== Draft picks ==
Pittsburgh's draft picks at the 1991 NHL entry draft.

Round	#	Player	Pos	Nationality	College/Junior/Club team (League)
1	16	Markus Naslund	Left wing	Sweden	Modo Hockey Ornskoldsvik (SEL)
2	38	Rusty Fitzgerald	Center	United States	Duluth East H.S. (Minn.)
3	60	Shane Peacock	Defense	Canada	Lethbridge Hurricanes (WHL)
4	82	Joe Tamminen	Center	United States	Virginia H.S. (Minn.)
5	104	Robert Melanson	Defense	Canada	Hull Olympiques (QMJHL)
6	126	Brian Clifford	Center	United States	Nichols (N.Y. H.S.)
7	148	Ed Patterson	Right wing	Canada	Kamloops Blazers (WHL)
8	170	Peter McLaughlin	Defense	United States	Belmont Hill H.S. (Massachusetts)
9	192	Jeff Lembke	Goaltender	United States	Omaha Lancers (USHL)
10	214	Chris Tok	Defense	United States	Greenway (Minn H.S.)
11	236	Paul Dyck	Defense	Canada	Moose Jaw Warriors (WHL)
12	258	Pasi Huura	Defense	Finland	Ilves Tampere (FNL)
S	22	Greg Carvel	Center	United States	St. Lawrence University (ECAC)

== Farm teams ==
The IHL's Muskegon Lumberjacks finished second in the East Division with a 41-28-13 record. They defeated the Milwaukee Admirals and Kalamazoo Wings before being swept by the Kansas City Blades in the Turner Cup Finals. This finals loss came as a result of the Penguins recalling Jock Callander, Mike Needham, and Dave Michayluk to fill open spots left by injuries to both Mario Lemieux and Joe Mullen. Michayluk still won the Ironman Award by the IHL for playing in all of his team's games while displaying outstanding offensive and defensive abilities.

The East Coast Hockey League's Knoxville Cherokees finished last overall in the standings with a record of 20–36–8.

== Media affiliates ==
Radio

Flagship station	Play-by-play	Color commentator	Studio host
KDKA AM 1020 (main); WDVE-FM 102.5 (backup)	Mike Lange	Paul Steigerwald	

Some of the games broadcast on WDVE because of KDKA's broadcast conflict with the Pittsburgh Pirates.

Television

Local TV	Play-by-play	Color commentator
KDKA-TV 2 KBL	Mike Lange	Paul Steigerwald

== See also ==
- 1991–92 NHL season
