= 1991–92 Philadelphia Flyers season =

NHL hockey team season

1991–92 Philadelphia Flyers
- Division: 6th Patrick
- Conference: 8th Wales
- 1991–92 record: 32–37–11
- Home record: 22–11–7
- Road record: 10–26–4
- Goals for: 252 (17th)
- Goals against: 273 (9th)

Team information
- General manager: Russ Farwell
- Coach: Paul Holmgren (Oct.–Dec.); Bill Dineen (Dec.–Apr.)
- Captain: Rick Tocchet (Oct.–Feb.); Vacant (Feb.–Apr.)
- Alternate captains: Terry Carkner; Kevin Dineen; Unknown (Feb.–Apr)
- Arena: Spectrum
- Average attendance: 17,140
- Minor league affiliate: Hershey Bears

Team leaders
- Goals: Rod Brind'Amour (33)
- Assists: Rod Brind'Amour (44)
- Points: Rod Brind'Amour (77)
- Penalty minutes: Terry Carkner (195)
- Plus/minus: Mark Howe (+18)
- Wins: Ron Hextall (16)
- Goals against average: Dominic Roussel (2.60)

The 1991–92 Philadelphia Flyers season was the franchise's 25th season in the National Hockey League (NHL). The Flyers hosted the 43rd NHL All-Star Game. They missed the Stanley Cup playoffs for the third consecutive season.

== Regular season ==
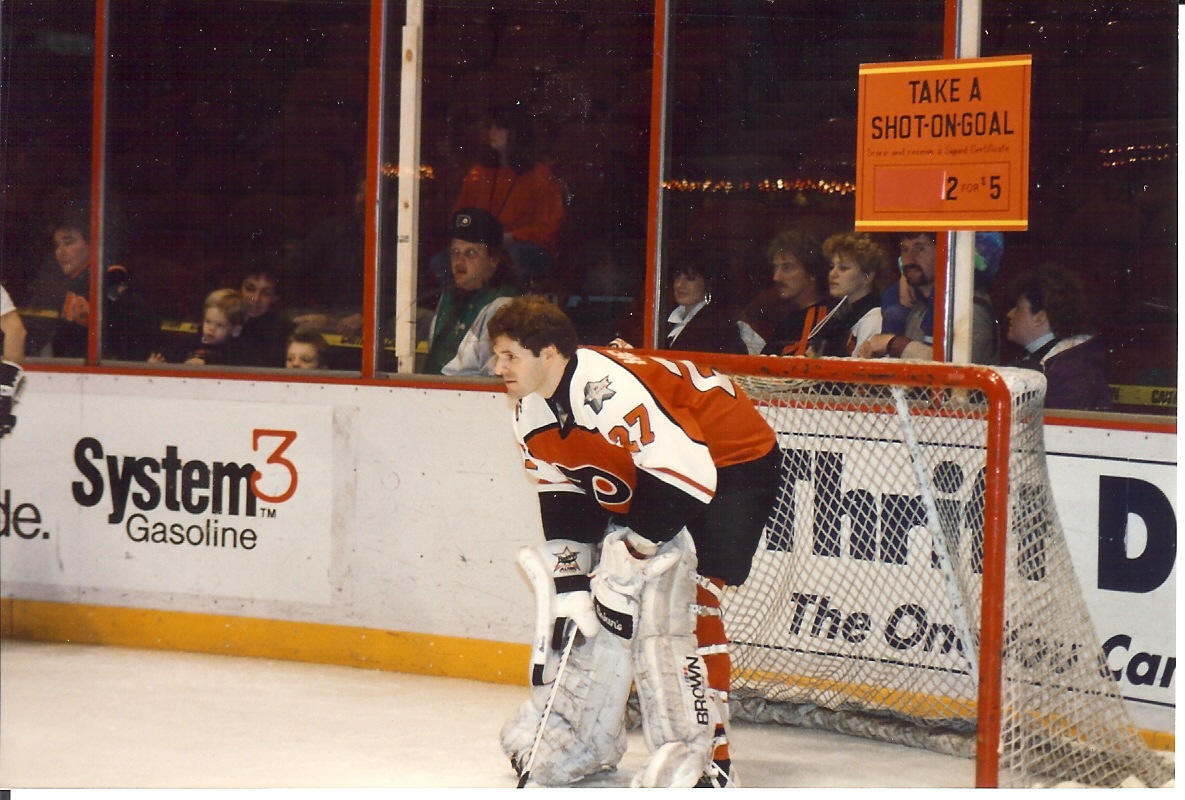
Ron Hextall at the 1992 Flyers Wives Carnival.

Prior to the 1991–92 season, the Flyers acquired Rod Brind'Amour and Dan Quinn from the St. Louis Blues in exchange for Murray Baron and Flyers captain Ron Sutter. Brind'Amour led the Flyers in goals (33), assists (44) and points (77) in his first season with the club. Rick Tocchet was named team captain to replace Sutter. As the Flyers continued to flounder, Paul Holmgren was fired in December and replaced by Bill Dineen, father of Flyer Kevin Dineen. On February 19, the Flyers and the Pittsburgh Penguins made a major five-player deal which featured Tocchet – who never grew comfortably into the role of captain – heading to Pittsburgh and Mark Recchi coming to Philadelphia. Recchi recorded 27 points in his first 22 games as a Flyer, but the team missed the playoffs for the third consecutive year, due in large part to an awful road record (10–26–4).

With Brind'Amour and Quinn in the fold to create more offense, plus a healthy Hextall in net, the Flyers still got off to an 0–3–1 start. After a 4–2 win over New Jersey, the club awakened, trading roughly two wins for every loss and climbing to 8–8–1 following back-to-back 3–1 wins over the Edmonton Oilers and Montreal Canadiens in mid-November.

From there, injuries and poor play from regulars began to doom Paul Holmgren's tenure behind the bench. An eight-game winless streak (0–7–1) effectively put an end to his tenure. Murray Craven was traded to the Hartford Whalers in exchange for the younger Dineen during the run, which included blow-out home losses to the Whalers (7–3 on November 27) and the Penguins (9–3 on November 29). In both home games, the Spectrum crowd loudly chanted "Paul Must Go" during multiple stoppages in play. Flyers fans received their wish on December 4, with the Flyers at 8–14–2, as Bill Dineen took the helm.

The team began his tenure at 4–1–5, but still slipped into last place by late January. A 7–1–2 string brought the club within striking distance of a playoff spot by mid-February, but an inability to win on the road within the division sabotaged their comeback effort. After the three-way deal between the Flyers, Penguins and Kings was completed, the club had an infusion of scoring with Recchi, but it was too late to make up ground in the standings.

A five-game win streak from March 12–22 yielded a 7–6 comeback win over the Capitals in Landover, in which the Flyers scored four times in the third period - but the momentum didn't last as a 2–5–0 finish, compounded by a 12-day National Hockey League Players' Association strike, sent the club into the Patrick Division basement for the second time in three years.

The Flyers struggled on the power play in the regular season, finishing 22nd in power play percentage with 16.55% (68 for 411).

=== Season standings ===
Patrick Division
	GP	W	L	T	GF	GA	Pts
**New York Rangers**	**80**	**50**	**25**	**5**	**321**	**246**	**105**
**Washington Capitals**	**80**	**45**	**27**	**8**	**330**	**257**	**98**
**Pittsburgh Penguins**	**80**	**39**	**32**	**9**	**343**	**308**	**87**
**New Jersey Devils**	**80**	**38**	**31**	**11**	**289**	**259**	**87**
New York Islanders	80	34	35	11	291	299	79
Philadelphia Flyers	80	32	37	11	252	273	75

Wales Conference
R		Div	GP	W	L	T	GF	GA	Pts
1	**p** – **New York Rangers**	**PAT**	**80**	**50**	**25**	**5**	**321**	**246**	**105**
2	**Washington Capitals**	**PAT**	**80**	**45**	**27**	**8**	**330**	**257**	**98**
3	**Montreal Canadiens**	**ADM**	**80**	**41**	**28**	**11**	**267**	**207**	**93**
4	**Pittsburgh Penguins**	**PAT**	**80**	**39**	**32**	**9**	**343**	**308**	**87**
5	**New Jersey Devils**	**PAT**	**80**	**38**	**31**	**11**	**289**	**259**	**87**
6	**Boston Bruins**	**ADM**	**80**	**36**	**32**	**12**	**270**	**275**	**84**
7	New York Islanders	PAT	80	34	35	11	291	299	79
8	Philadelphia Flyers	PAT	80	32	37	11	252	273	75
9	**Buffalo Sabres**	**ADM**	**80**	**31**	**37**	**12**	**289**	**299**	**74**
10	**Hartford Whalers**	**ADM**	**80**	**26**	**41**	**13**	**247**	**283**	**65**
11	Quebec Nordiques	ADM	80	20	48	12	255	318	52

Divisions: ADM – Adams, PAT – Patrick

p – Clinched Presidents' Trophy
bold – Qualified for playoffs

== Schedule and results ==
1991–92 regular season
October: 4–5–1, 9 points (home: 3–2–0; road: 1–3–1)

Game	Date	Score	Opponent	Decision	Record	Points	Recap
1	October 4	2–5	@ Washington Capitals	Hextall	0–1–0	0	L
2	October 6	2–2 OT	@ Pittsburgh Penguins	Hextall	0–1–1	1	T
3	October 10	3–6	Pittsburgh Penguins	Wregget	0–2–1	1	L
4	October 12	4–5	@ New York Islanders	Wregget	0–3–1	1	L
5	October 13	4–2	New Jersey Devils	Wregget	1–3–1	3	W
6	October 17	5–3	Quebec Nordiques	Roussel	2–3–1	5	W
7	October 19	0–1	Montreal Canadiens	Roussel	2–4–1	5	L
8	October 24	5–2	@ Minnesota North Stars	Roussel	3–4–1	7	W
9	October 25	0–2	@ Winnipeg Jets	Roussel	3–5–1	7	L
10	October 31	5–2	San Jose Sharks	Hextall	4–5–1	9	W

November: 4–8–1, 9 points (home: 2–4–1; road: 2–4–0)

Game	Date	Score	Opponent	Decision	Record	Points	Recap
11	November 2	2–4	New York Rangers	Hextall	4–6–1	9	L
12	November 5	4–3	@ St. Louis Blues	Hextall	5–6–1	11	W
13	November 7	5–2	Buffalo Sabres	Hextall	6–6–1	13	W
14	November 8	3–4 OT	@ Buffalo Sabres	Hextall	6–7–1	13	L
15	November 12	2–5	@ New Jersey Devils	Hextall	6–8–1	13	L
16	November 14	3–1	Edmonton Oilers	Wregget	7–8–1	15	W
17	November 16	3–1	@ Montreal Canadiens	Wregget	8–8–1	17	W
18	November 17	1–2	Winnipeg Jets	Wregget	8–9–1	17	L
19	November 20	2–5	@ Pittsburgh Penguins	Hextall	8–10–1	17	L
20	November 23	5–5 OT	New Jersey Devils	Wregget	8–10–2	18	T
21	November 27	3–7	Hartford Whalers	Hextall	8–11–2	18	L
22	November 29	3–9	Pittsburgh Penguins	Roussel	8–12–2	18	L
23	November 30	1–5	@ Pittsburgh Penguins	Wregget	8–13–2	18	L

December: 4–4–5, 13 points (home: 2–1–3; road: 2–3–2)

Game	Date	Score	Opponent	Decision	Record	Points	Recap
24	December 2	2–4	@ New York Rangers	Wregget	8–14–2	18	L
25	December 5	3–6	Washington Capitals	Wregget	8–15–2	18	L
26	December 7	5–3	@ Boston Bruins	Wregget	9–15–2	20	W
27	December 8	2–2 OT	New Jersey Devils	Roussel	9–15–3	21	T
28	December 12	1–1 OT	Toronto Maple Leafs	Wregget	9–15–4	22	T
29	December 14	1–1 OT	Chicago Blackhawks	Roussel	9–15–5	23	T
30	December 15	4–4 OT	@ Chicago Blackhawks	Wregget	9–15–6	24	T
31	December 18	3–6	@ New York Rangers	Roussel	9–16–6	24	L
32	December 19	6–2	New York Islanders	Wregget	10–16–6	26	W
33	December 21	3–0	@ Minnesota North Stars	Hextall	11–16–6	28	W
34	December 22	4–3 OT	Washington Capitals	Wregget	12–16–6	30	W
35	December 27	1–1 OT	@ Vancouver Canucks	Hextall	12–16–7	31	T
36	December 28	1–5	@ Calgary Flames	Wregget	12–17–7	31	L

January: 4–7–2, 10 points (home: 4–1–2; road: 0–6–0)

Game	Date	Score	Opponent	Decision	Record	Points	Recap
37	January 3	1–3	@ San Jose Sharks	Hextall	12–18–7	31	L
38	January 4	3–7	@ Los Angeles Kings	Wregget	12–19–7	31	L
39	January 7	5–5 OT	Buffalo Sabres	Hextall	12–19–8	32	T
40	January 9	5–2	Los Angeles Kings	Hextall	13–19–8	34	W
41	January 11	1–5	@ Boston Bruins	Hextall	13–20–8	34	L
42	January 12	4–3	New York Islanders	Wregget	14–20–8	36	W
43	January 14	1–1 OT	Chicago Blackhawks	Hextall	14–20–9	37	T
44	January 16	3–4	@ New York Islanders	Hextall	14–21–9	37	L
45	January 21	3–7	@ Detroit Red Wings	Hextall	14–22–9	37	L
46	January 23	0–1	Winnipeg Jets	Hextall	14–23–9	37	L
47	January 25	4–6	@ Toronto Maple Leafs	Hextall	14–24–9	37	L
48	January 28	3–2	Washington Capitals	Hextall	15–24–9	39	W
49	January 30	5–3	Minnesota North Stars	Hextall	16–24–9	41	W

February: 7–5–2, 16 points (home: 5–0–1; road: 2–5–1)

Game	Date	Score	Opponent	Decision	Record	Points	Recap
50	February 1	5–5 OT	@ New York Islanders	Hextall	16–24–10	42	T
51	February 2	5–1	St. Louis Blues	Wregget	17–24–10	44	W
52	February 4	1–3	@ New Jersey Devils	Hextall	17–25–10	44	L
53	February 6	5–1	Boston Bruins	Wregget	18–25–10	46	W
54	February 8	3–0	@ Quebec Nordiques	Hextall	19–25–10	48	W
55	February 13	3–2	Quebec Nordiques	Hextall	20–25–10	50	W
56	February 15	8–5	Edmonton Oilers	Hextall	21–25–10	52	W
57	February 16	3–3 OT	Pittsburgh Penguins	Hextall	21–25–11	53	T
58	February 18	3–4 OT	@ New Jersey Devils	Hextall	21–26–11	53	L
59	February 22	5–7	@ Washington Capitals	Hextall	21–27–11	53	L
60	February 23	1–2 OT	@ New York Rangers	Roussel	21–28–11	53	L
61	February 25	4–1	New York Islanders	Roussel	22–28–11	55	W
62	February 27	3–0	@ Calgary Flames	Roussel	23–28–11	57	W
63	February 28	2–4	@ Edmonton Oilers	Hextall	23–29–11	57	L

March: 8–6–0, 16 points (home: 5–2–0; road: 3–4–0)

Game	Date	Score	Opponent	Decision	Record	Points	Recap
64	March 1	1–0	@ San Jose Sharks	Hextall	24–29–11	59	W
65	March 3	1–4	@ Los Angeles Kings	Roussel	24–30–11	59	L
66	March 7	5–4	New York Rangers	Hextall	25–30–11	61	W
67	March 8	3–7	Vancouver Canucks	Hextall	25–31–11	61	L
68	March 10	2–5	@ New York Islanders	Roussel	25–32–11	61	L
69	March 12	5–4 OT	Calgary Flames	Hextall	26–32–11	63	W
70	March 14	3–1	Washington Capitals	Hextall	27–32–11	65	W
71	March 18	4–3	@ Montreal Canadiens	Hextall	28–32–11	67	W
72	March 20	7–6	@ Washington Capitals	Hextall	29–32–11	69	W
73	March 22	4–3	Detroit Red Wings	Roussel	30–32–11	71	W
74	March 24	3–4	New York Rangers	Hextall	30–33–11	71	L
75	March 25	1–4	@ New York Rangers	Hextall	30–34–11	71	L
76	March 29	5–4	New Jersey Devils	Roussel	31–34–11	73	W
77	March 31	5–6	@ Pittsburgh Penguins	Hextall	31–35–11	73	L

April: 1–2–0, 2 points (home: 1–1–0; road: 0–1–0)

Game	Date	Score	Opponent	Decision	Record	Points	Recap
78	April 12	2–4	@ Hartford Whalers	Hextall	31–36–11	73	L
79	April 13	6–2	Toronto Maple Leafs	Roussel	32–36–11	75	W
80	April 15	3–4 OT	Hartford Whalers	Roussel	32–37–11	75	L

Legend: W Win (2 points) L Loss (0 points) T Tie (1 point)

== Player statistics ==
=== Scoring ===
- Position abbreviations: C = Center; D = Defense; G = Goaltender; LW = Left wing; RW = Right wing
- † = Joined team via a transaction (e.g., trade, waivers, signing) during the season. Stats reflect time with the Flyers only.
- ‡ = Left team via a transaction (e.g., trade, waivers, release) during the season. Stats reflect time with the Flyers only.

No.	Player	Pos	Regular season					
No.	Player	Pos	GP	G	A	Pts	+/-	PIM
17	Rod Brind'Amour	C	80	33	44	77	−3	100
20	Kevin Dineen†	RW	64	26	30	56	1	130
18	Mike Ricci	C	78	20	36	56	−10	93
28 (Note: Duchesne originally wore number 19 until Samuelsson was traded.)	Steve Duchesne	D	78	18	38	56	−7	86
14 (Note: Pederson originally wore number 41 and changed numbers after the February 19 trade with Pittsburgh.)	Mark Pederson	LW	58	15	25	40	14	22
10 (Note: Quinn wore number 14 in his first eight games.)	Dan Quinn	C	67	11	26	37	−13	26
5	Kerry Huffman	D	60	14	18	32	1	41
23	Andrei Lomakin	RW	57	14	16	30	−6	26
22	Rick Tocchet‡	RW	42	13	16	29	3	102
8	Mark Recchi†	RW	22	10	17	27	−5	18
2	Mark Howe	D	42	7	18	25	18	18
9	Pelle Eklund	LW	51	7	16	23	0	4
40	Claude Boivin	LW	58	5	13	18	−2	187
3	Garry Galley†	D	39	3	15	18	1	34
25	Keith Acton	C	50	7	10	17	−4	98
47	Brad Jones	LW	48	7	10	17	−2	44
29	Terry Carkner	D	73	4	12	16	−14	195
19	Brian Benning†	D	22	2	12	14	−9	35
37	Mark Freer	LW	50	6	7	13	−1	18
28	Kjell Samuelsson‡	D	54	4	9	13	1	76
46	Al Conroy	C	31	2	9	11	1	74
3	Gord Murphy‡	D	31	2	8	10	−4	33
44	Corey Foster	D	25	3	4	7	−14	20
21	Dave Brown	RW	70	4	2	6	−11	81
32	Murray Craven‡	C	12	3	3	6	2	8
15	Steve Kasper	C	16	3	2	5	−3	10
15 (Note: Kushner wore number 8 in his first ten games.)	Dale Kushner	LW	19	3	2	5	−5	18
43	Tony Horacek‡	LW	34	1	3	4	−9	51
6	Dan Kordic	D	46	1	3	4	1	126
11	Jiri Latal‡	D	10	1	2	3	1	4
27	Ron Hextall	G	45	0	3	3		35
14 (Note: Daniels wore number 46 in his first 18 games.)	Kimbi Daniels	C	25	1	1	2	−4	4
35	Ken Wregget‡	G	23	0	2	2		0
24	Pat Murray	LW	9	1	0	1	3	0
36	Wes Walz†	C	2	1	0	1	1	0
26	Martin Hostak	C	5	0	1	1	−1	2
33	Dominic Roussel	G	17	0	1	1		2
24	Rod Dallman	LW	2	0	0	0	0	5
66	Yanick Dupre	LW	1	0	0	0	0	0
14	Chris Jensen	RW	2	0	0	0	−1	0
42	Moe Mantha†	D	5	0	0	0	0	2
48	Reid Simpson	LW	1	0	0	0	0	0

=== Goaltending ===
- ‡ = Left team via a transaction (e.g., trade, waivers, release) during the season. Stats reflect time with the Flyers only.

No.	Player	Regular season										
No.	Player	GP	GS	W	L	T	SA	GA	GAA	SV%	SO	TOI
27	Ron Hextall	45	43	16	21	6	1294	151	3.40	.883	3	2,668
35	Ken Wregget‡	23	23	9	8	3	557	75	3.57	.865	0	1,259
33	Dominic Roussel	17	14	7	8	2	437	40	2.60	.908	1	922

== Awards and records ==
=== Awards ===
Type	Award/honor	Recipient	Ref
League (annual)	NHL second All-Star team	Mark Recchi (Right wing)	
League (in-season)	NHL All-Star Game selection	Rod Brind'Amour	
Team	Barry Ashbee Trophy	Steve Duchesne	
Team	Bobby Clarke Trophy	Rod Brind'Amour	
Team	Class Guy Award	Kevin Dineen	

=== Records ===
Among the team records set during the 1991–92 season was a four-game tie streak from December 8 to December 15, tying a team record dating back to the 1968–69 season. The Flyers 26 road losses is a single season franchise high.

The 1991–92 season was Mark Howe’s tenth and final season with the Flyers. Howe holds the regular season career marks among Flyers defensemen for goals (138), assists (342), and points (480). He also holds the same playoff marks for assists (45) and points (53).

=== Milestones ===
Milestone	Player	Date	Ref
First game	Dan Kordic	October 4, 1991	
First game	Yanick Dupre	October 6, 1991	
First game	Andrei Lomakin	October 6, 1991	
First game	Dominic Roussel	October 17, 1991	
First game	Claude Boivin	November 30, 1991	
First game	Al Conroy	January 25, 1992	
First game	Reid Simpson	April 12, 1992	

== Transactions ==
The Flyers were involved in the following transactions from May 26, 1991, the day after the deciding game of the 1991 Stanley Cup Final, through June 1, 1992, the day of the deciding game of the 1992 Stanley Cup Final.

=== Trades ===
Date	Details		Ref
May 30, 1991	To Philadelphia Flyers: Dave Brown; Corey Foster; Rights to Jari Kurri	To Edmonton Oilers: Craig Berube; Craig Fisher; Scott Mellanby	
May 30, 1991	To Philadelphia Flyers: Steve Duchesne; Steve Kasper; 4th-round pick in 1991	To Los Angeles Kings: Jeff Chychrun; Rights to Jari Kurri	
July 29, 1991	To Philadelphia Flyers: Choice of a 1992 or 1993 draft pick (Note: The Flyers had the choice of receiving Toronto's 1992 fourth-round pick or Toronto's 1993 third-round pick. The Flyers chose the 1993 third-round pick.)	To Toronto Maple Leafs: Rights to Mike Bullard	
August 5, 1991	To Philadelphia Flyers: Future considerations	To New York Rangers: Shaun Sabol	
August 8, 1991	To Philadelphia Flyers: Future considerations	To New York Rangers: Don Biggs	
September 22, 1991	To Philadelphia Flyers: Rod Brind'Amour; Dan Quinn	To St. Louis Blues: Murray Baron; Ron Sutter	
November 13, 1991	To Philadelphia Flyers: Kevin Dineen	To Hartford Whalers: Murray Craven; 4th-round pick in 1992	
January 2, 1992	To Philadelphia Flyers: Garry Galley; Wes Walz; 3rd-round pick in 1993	To Boston Bruins: Brian Dobbin; Gord Murphy; 3rd-round pick in 1992; 4th round pick in 1993	
February 7, 1992	To Philadelphia Flyers: Ryan McGill	To Chicago Blackhawks: Tony Horacek	
February 19, 1992	To Philadelphia Flyers: Brian Benning; Mark Recchi; Los Angeles' 1st-round pick in 1992	To Pittsburgh Penguins: Kjell Samuelsson; Rick Tocchet; Ken Wregget; Conditional 3rd-round pick in 1993 (Note: Condition met.)	
February 27, 1992	To Philadelphia Flyers: Moe Mantha	To Winnipeg Jets: Future considerations	

=== Players acquired ===
Date	Player	Former team	Term	Via	Ref
August 6, 1991	Brad Jones	Los Angeles Kings	2-year	Free agency	
August 21, 1991	Al Conroy	Detroit Red Wings		Free agency	

=== Players lost ===
Date	Player	New team	Via	Ref
May 30, 1991	Tim Kerr	San Jose Sharks	Expansion draft	
August 12, 1991	Scott Sandelin	Minnesota North Stars	Free agency	
September 26, 1991	Pete Peeters (Note: Peeters retired.)		Buyout	
October 3, 1991	Normand Lacombe	Canadian National Team (Note: Lacombe briefly played for the Canadian national team before retiring.)	Buyout	
October 26, 1991	Derrick Smith	Minnesota North Stars	Waivers	
February 3, 1992	Jiri Latal	Vålerenga Ishockey (Norway) (Note: Latal played the remainder of the 1991–92 season for Valerenga.)	Buyout	

=== Signings ===
Date	Player	Term	Ref
August 7, 1991	Jamie Cooke		
August 7, 1991	Kimbi Daniels		
September 25, 1991	Yanick Dupre		
October 3, 1991	Andrei Lomakin		
November 1991	Ken Wregget	1-year (Note: Option for second year)	

== Draft picks ==
=== NHL entry draft ===
Philadelphia's picks at the 1991 NHL entry draft, which was held at the Buffalo Memorial Auditorium in Buffalo, New York, on June 22, 1991. The Flyers traded their second-round pick, 28th overall, to the Montreal Canadiens for Mark Pederson on March 5, 1991. They also traded their fourth-round pick, 72nd overall, and Jay Wells to the Buffalo Sabres for Kevin Maguire and the Sabres' 1990 second-round pick on March 5, 1990, and their eight-round pick, 160th overall, and Kevin Maguire to the Toronto Maple Leafs for the Maple Leafs' 1990 third-round pick on June 16, 1990.

Round	Pick	Player	Position	Nationality	Team (league)	Notes
1	6	Peter Forsberg	Center	Sweden	Modo Hockey (Elitserien)	
3	50	Yanick Dupre	Left wing	Canada	Drummondville Voltigeurs (QMJHL)	
4	86	Aris Brimanis	Defense	United States	Bowling Green State University (CCHA)	(Note: The Flyers traded Jeff Chychrun and the rights to Jari Kurri to the Los Angeles Kings for Steve Duchesne, Steve Kasper and the Kings' fourth-round pick, 86th overall, on May 30, 1991.)
5	94	Yanick Degrace	Goaltender	Canada	Trois-Rivières Draveurs (QMJHL)	
6	116	Clayton Norris	Right wing	Canada	Medicine Hat Tigers (WHL)	
6	122	Dmitri Yushkevich	Defense	Soviet Union	Torpedo Yaroslavl (Soviet Union)	(Note: The Flyers traded Dave Brown to the Edmonton Oilers for Keith Acton and the Oilers' sixth-round pick, 122nd overall, on February 7, 1989.)
7	138	Andrei Lomakin	Left wing	Soviet Union	Dynamo Moscow (Soviet Union)	
9	182	Jim Bode	Left wing	United States	Robbinsdale Armstrong High School (USHS-MN)	
10	204	Josh Bartell	Defense	United States	Rome Free Academy (USHS-NY)	
11	226	Neil Little	Goaltender	Canada	Rensselaer Polytechnic Institute (ECAC)	
12	248	John Parco	Center	Canada	Belleville Bulls (OHL)	

=== NHL supplemental draft ===
Philadelphia's picks at the 1991 NHL supplemental draft.

Round	Pick	Player	Position	Nationality	Team (league)
1	6	Angelo Libertucci	Goaltender	Canada	Bowling Green State University (CCHA)
2	12	Brendan Locke	Right wing	United States	Merrimack College (Hockey East)

== Farm teams ==
The Flyers were affiliated with the Hershey Bears of the American Hockey League.
