= 1991–92 New York Rangers season =

National Hockey League team season

1991–92 New York Rangers
- Presidents' Trophy winners
- Patrick Division champions
- Division: 1st Patrick
- Conference: 1st Wales
- 1991–92 record: 50–25–5
- Home record: 28–8–4
- Road record: 22–17–1
- Goals for: 321
- Goals against: 246

Team information
- General manager: Neil Smith
- Coach: Roger Neilson
- Captain: Mark Messier
- Alternate captains: Mike Gartner; Brian Leetch
- Arena: Madison Square Garden

Team leaders
- Goals: Mike Gartner (40)
- Assists: Brian Leetch (80)
- Points: Mark Messier (107)
- Penalty minutes: Tie Domi (246)
- Plus/minus: James Patrick (+34)
- Wins: John Vanbiesbrouck (27)
- Goals against average: John Vanbiesbrouck (2.85)

The 1991–92 New York Rangers season was the franchise's 66th season. The season saw the Rangers finish in first place in the Patrick Division with a record of 50 wins, 25 losses, and 5 ties for 105 points. This was the highest points total in the league that season, netting the Rangers the Presidents' Trophy. This season marked the first time since the 1941–42 NHL season that the Rangers were the top team in the NHL. In the playoffs, they defeated their cross-river rivals, the New Jersey Devils, in seven games in the Division Semi-finals before falling to the eventual Stanley Cup champion Pittsburgh Penguins in six games in the Division Finals.

The 1991–92 season was Mark Messier's first in New York, having arrived from the Edmonton Oilers via trade on October 5, 1991. He scored 35 goals and 72 assists for 107 points, winning his second Hart Memorial Trophy as the league's Most Valuable Player. Rangers defenceman Brian Leetch had a spectacular season, leading all rearguards in the NHL in scoring (22 goals and 80 assists for 102 points) and receiving the James Norris Memorial Trophy as the league's top defenceman. The Rangers, along with the Detroit Red Wings and Pittsburgh Penguins, had five 30-goal scorers. New York was not shut out in any of their 80 regular-season games.

== Pre-season ==
On September 27, 1991, the Rangers played the Los Angeles Kings in the first ever outdoor NHL game in Las Vegas, Nevada, at Caesars Palace. This was also the first NHL game in Las Vegas since 1968. The crowd on hand was 13,000 with the Kings beating the Rangers 5–2.

== Regular season ==
Towards the end of the regular season, the NHL went on a 10-day strike, causing the league to shut down from April 1–April 12. The games that were originally scheduled to be played during that 10-day period were made up once the strike was over.

The Rangers had an effective penalty-killing unit, as they tied the Montreal Canadiens and the Washington Capitals for the fewest power-play goals allowed during the regular season, with just 60. The Rangers also led the NHL in penalty-killing percentage (84.81%).

=== Season standings ===
Patrick Division
	GP	W	L	T	GF	GA	Pts
**New York Rangers**	**80**	**50**	**25**	**5**	**321**	**246**	**105**
**Washington Capitals**	**80**	**45**	**27**	**8**	**330**	**257**	**98**
**Pittsburgh Penguins**	**80**	**39**	**32**	**9**	**343**	**308**	**87**
**New Jersey Devils**	**80**	**38**	**31**	**11**	**289**	**259**	**87**
New York Islanders	80	34	35	11	291	299	79
Philadelphia Flyers	80	32	37	11	252	273	75

Wales Conference
R		Div	GP	W	L	T	GF	GA	Pts
1	**p** – **New York Rangers**	**PAT**	**80**	**50**	**25**	**5**	**321**	**246**	**105**
2	**Washington Capitals**	**PAT**	**80**	**45**	**27**	**8**	**330**	**257**	**98**
3	**Montreal Canadiens**	**ADM**	**80**	**41**	**28**	**11**	**267**	**207**	**93**
4	**Pittsburgh Penguins**	**PAT**	**80**	**39**	**32**	**9**	**343**	**308**	**87**
5	**New Jersey Devils**	**PAT**	**80**	**38**	**31**	**11**	**289**	**259**	**87**
6	**Boston Bruins**	**ADM**	**80**	**36**	**32**	**12**	**270**	**275**	**84**
7	New York Islanders	PAT	80	34	35	11	291	299	79
8	Philadelphia Flyers	PAT	80	32	37	11	252	273	75
9	**Buffalo Sabres**	**ADM**	**80**	**31**	**37**	**12**	**289**	**299**	**74**
10	**Hartford Whalers**	**ADM**	**80**	**26**	**41**	**13**	**247**	**283**	**65**
11	Quebec Nordiques	ADM	80	20	48	12	255	318	52

Divisions: ADM – Adams, PAT – Patrick

p – Clinched Presidents' Trophy
bold – Qualified for playoffs

== Schedule and results ==
1991–92 regular season
October: 9–5–0 (home: 6–2–0; road: 3–3–0)

Game	October	Opponent	Score	Record
1	3	@ Boston Bruins	5 – 3	0–1–0
2	5	@ Montreal Canadiens	2 – 1 OT	1–1–0
3	7	Boston Bruins	2 – 1 OT	2–1–0
4	9	New York Islanders	5 – 3	3–1–0
5	11	@ Washington Capitals	5 – 1	3–2–0
6	12	@ Hartford Whalers	5 – 2	3–3–0
7	14	Washington Capitals	5 – 3	3–4–0
8	16	New Jersey Devils	4 – 2	4–4–0
9	19	@ Pittsburgh Penguins	5 – 4	5–4–0
10	20	Edmonton Oilers	4 – 3	5–5–0
11	23	Los Angeles Kings	7 – 2	6–5–0
12	26	@ Quebec Nordiques	5 – 3	7–5–0
13	29	Minnesota North Stars	3 – 2	8–5–0
14	31	Quebec Nordiques	5 – 4	9–5–0

November: 6–5–1 (home: 2–2–1; road: 4–3–0)

Game	November	Opponent	Score	Record
15	2	@ Philadelphia Flyers	4 – 2	10–5–0
16	4	Calgary Flames	4 – 0	11–5–0
17	6	Montreal Canadiens	4 – 1	11–6–0
18	8	Toronto Maple Leafs	3 – 3 OT	11–6–1
19	11	Pittsburgh Penguins	3 – 1	12–6–1
20	13	Washington Capitals	5 – 3	12–7–1
21	16	@ New York Islanders	4 – 2	12–8–1
22	19	@ Vancouver Canucks	4 – 3	13–8–1
23	21	@ Los Angeles Kings	6 – 1	13–9–1
24	23	@ St. Louis Blues	3 – 0	14–9–1
25	27	@ Winnipeg Jets	3 – 2	14–10–1
26	29	@ Buffalo Sabres	5 – 4 OT	15–10–1

December: 10–4–0 (home: 5–1–0; road: 5–3–0)

Game	December	Opponent	Score	Record
27	2	Philadelphia Flyers	4 – 2	16–10–1
28	6	@ Detroit Red Wings	6 – 5 OT	16–11–1
29	8	Boston Bruins	4 – 0	17–11–1
30	10	@ Pittsburgh Penguins	5 – 3	17–12–1
31	13	@ Washington Capitals	5 – 3	18–12–1
32	14	@ Hartford Whalers	6 – 2	19–12–1
33	16	San Jose Sharks	4 – 3 OT	20–12–1
34	18	Philadelphia Flyers	6 – 3	21–12–1
35	21	@ Pittsburgh Penguins	7 – 5	22–12–1
36	23	New Jersey Devils	3 – 0	23–12–1
37	26	@ Washington Capitals	8 – 6	24–12–1
38	28	@ New York Islanders	5 – 4	24–13–1
39	29	Pittsburgh Penguins	6 – 3	24–14–1
40	31	@ Winnipeg Jets	5 – 2	25–14–1

January: 8–3–1 (home: 3–1–0; road: 5–2–1)

Game	January	Opponent	Score	Record
41	2	@ Chicago Blackhawks	4 – 3	26–14–1
42	4	@ New Jersey Devils	6 – 4	26–15–1
43	6	Winnipeg Jets	4 – 2	27–15–1
44	8	St. Louis Blues	5 – 3	27–16–1
45	11	@ Quebec Nordiques	7 – 2	28–16–1
46	12	@ Buffalo Sabres	6 – 3	28–17–1
47	14	Buffalo Sabres	6 – 2	29–17–1
48	16	Calgary Flames	6 – 4	30–17–1
49	22	@ Calgary Flames	4 – 4 OT	30–17–2
50	23	@ Edmonton Oilers	3 – 1	31–17–2
51	28	@ San Jose Sharks	4 – 2	32–17–2
52	30	@ Los Angeles Kings	4 – 1	33–17–2

February: 7–3–2 (home: 6–0–2; road: 1–3–0)

Game	February	Opponent	Score	Record
53	1	@ Minnesota North Stars	2 – 1	34–17–2
54	5	Pittsburgh Penguins	4 – 3	35–17–2
55	7	@ Washington Capitals	6 – 2	35–18–2
56	9	Detroit Red Wings	5 – 5 OT	35–18–3
57	12	Vancouver Canucks	5 – 2	36–18–3
58	14	New York Islanders	9 – 2	37–18–3
59	16	@ New Jersey Devils	4 – 2	37–19–3
60	17	Vancouver Canucks	3 – 3 OT	37–19–4
61	20	@ New York Islanders	6 – 2	37–20–4
62	21	Minnesota North Stars	5 – 4	38–20–4
63	23	Philadelphia Flyers	2 – 1 OT	39–20–4
64	25	Chicago Blackhawks	4 – 1	40–20–4

March: 9–4–1 (home: 5–2–1; road: 4–2–0)

Game	March	Opponent	Score	Record
65	1	Hartford Whalers	9 – 4	41–20–4
66	2	@ New Jersey Devils	7 – 1	42–20–4
67	4	New Jersey Devils	5 – 4	42–21–4
68	7	@ Philadelphia Flyers	5 – 4	42–22–4
69	9	Washington Capitals	5 – 2	42–23–4
70	11	Chicago Blackhawks	7 – 1	43–23–4
71	14	@ St. Louis Blues	6 – 0	44–23–4
72	16	Montreal Canadiens	4 – 1	45–23–4
73	18	New York Islanders	1 – 1 OT	45–23–5
74	20	@ Detroit Red Wings	4 – 2	46–23–5
75	22	New Jersey Devils	6 – 3	47–23–5
76	24	@ Philadelphia Flyers	4 – 3	48–23–5
77	25	Philadelphia Flyers	4 – 1	49–23–5
78	28	@ New York Islanders	4 – 1	49–24–5

April: 1–1–0 (home: 1–0–0; road: 0–1–0)

Game	April	Opponent	Score	Record
79	15	@ Toronto Maple Leafs	4 – 2	49–25–5
80	16	Pittsburgh Penguins	7 – 1	50–25–5

Legend: Win (2 points) Loss (0 points) Tie (1 point)

== Playoffs ==
1992 Stanley Cup playoffs
Division semifinals vs. (P4) New Jersey Devils – Rangers win 4–3

Game	Date	Visitor	Score	Home	OT	Attendance	Series
1	April 19	New Jersey Devils	1 – 2	New York Rangers		18,200	New York Rangers lead series 1–0
2	April 21	New Jersey Devils	7 – 3	New York Rangers		18,200	Series tied 1–1
3	April 23	New York Rangers	1 – 3	New Jersey Devils		19,040	New Jersey leads series 2–1
4	April 25	New York Rangers	3 – 0	New Jersey Devils		19,040	Series tied 2–2
5	April 27	New Jersey Devils	5 – 8	New York Rangers		18,200	New York Rangers lead series 3–2
6	April 29	New York Rangers	3 – 5	New Jersey Devils		19,040	Series tied 3–3
7	May 1	New Jersey Devils	4 – 8	New York Rangers		18,200	New York Rangers win series 4–3

Division Finals vs. (P3) Pittsburgh Penguins – Penguins win 4–2

Game	Date	Visitor	Score	Home	OT	Attendance	Series
1	May 3	Pittsburgh Penguins	4 – 2	New York Rangers		17,744	Pittsburgh leads series 1–0
2	May 5	Pittsburgh Penguins	2 – 4	New York Rangers		18,200	Series tied 1–1
3	May 7	New York Rangers	6 – 5	Pittsburgh Penguins	OT	16,164	New York Rangers lead series 2–1
4	May 9	New York Rangers	4 – 5	Pittsburgh Penguins	OT	16,164	Series tied 2–2
5	May 11	Pittsburgh Penguins	3 – 2	New York Rangers		18,200	Pittsburgh leads series 3–2
6	May 13	New York Rangers	1 – 5	Pittsburgh Penguins		16,164	Pittsburgh wins series 4–2

Legend: Win Loss

== Player statistics ==
Skaters

Regular season
Player	GP	G	A	Pts	+/-	PIM
Mark Messier	79	35	72	107	31	76
Brian Leetch	80	22	80	102	25	26
Mike Gartner	76	40	41	81	11	55
James Patrick	80	14	57	71	34	54
Tony Amonte	79	35	34	69	12	55
Adam Graves	80	26	33	59	19	139
Sergei Nemchinov	73	30	28	58	19	15
Darren Turcotte	71	30	23	53	11	57
John Ogrodnick	55	17	13	30	6	22
Doug Weight	53	8	22	30	-3	23
Paul Broten	74	13	15	28	14	102
Kris King	79	10	9	19	13	224
Par Djoos	50	1	18	19	7	40
Tim Kerr	32	7	11	18	-5	12
Jan Erixon	46	8	9	17	13	4
Joe Cirella	67	3	12	15	11	121
Randy Gilhen^{†}	40	7	7	14	5	14
Joey Kocur	51	7	4	11	-4	121
Jeff Beukeboom^{†}	56	1	10	11	19	122
Randy Moller^{‡}	43	2	7	9	-15	78
Mark Hardy	52	1	8	9	33	65
Tie Domi	42	2	4	6	-4	246
Corey Millen^{‡}	11	1	4	5	-1	10
Rob Zamuner	9	1	2	3	0	2
Normand Rochefort	26	0	2	2	-10	31
Rick Bennett	3	0	1	1	0	2
Jeff Bloemberg	3	0	1	1	1	0
David Shaw^{‡}	10	0	1	1	1	15
Peter Fiorentino	1	0	0	0	0	0
Bernie Nicholls^{‡}	1	0	0	0	-1	0
Jody Hull	3	0	0	0	-4	2
Mark Janssens^{‡}	4	0	0	0	-1	5
Jay Wells^{†}	11	0	0	0	2	24

Playoffs
Player	GP	G	A	Pts	PIM
Mike Gartner	13	8	8	16	4
Brian Leetch	13	4	11	15	4
Mark Messier	11	7	7	14	6
Tony Amonte	13	3	6	9	2
Adam Graves	10	5	3	8	22
James Patrick	13	0	7	7	12
Jeff Beukeboom	13	2	3	5	47
Jan Erixon	13	2	3	5	2
Kris King	13	4	1	5	14
Sergei Nemchinov	13	1	4	5	8
Joe Cirella	13	0	4	4	23
Doug Weight	7	2	2	4	0
Darren Turcotte	8	4	0	4	6
Mark Hardy	13	0	3	3	31
Randy Gilhen	13	1	2	3	2
Paul Broten	13	1	2	3	10
Jay Wells	13	0	2	2	10
Tie Domi	6	1	1	2	32
Joe Kocur	12	1	1	2	38
Tim Kerr	8	1	0	1	0
John Ogrodnick	3	0	0	0	0

Goaltenders

Regular season
Player	GP	TOI	W	L	T	GA	GAA	SA	SV%	SO
John Vanbiesbrouck	45	2526	27	13	3	120	2.85	1331	.910	2
Mike Richter	41	2298	23	12	2	119	3.11	1205	.901	3

Playoffs
Player	GP	TOI	W	L	GA	GAA	SA	SV%	SO
Mike Richter	7	412	4	2	24	3.50	226	.894	1
John Vanbiesbrouck	7	368	2	5	23	3.75	179	.872	0

^{†}Denotes player spent time with another team before joining Rangers. Stats reflect time with Rangers only.
^{‡}Traded mid-season. Stats reflect time with Rangers only.

Note:

Pos = Position;GP = Games played; G = Goals; A = Assists; Pts = Points; PIM = Penalty minutes; +/- = Plus/minus; PPG = Power-play goals; SHG = Short-handed goals; GWG = Game-winning goals
Pos = Position;GP = Games played; Min, TOI = Minutes played; W = Wins; L = Losses; T,T/OT = Ties; OTL = Overtime losses; GA = Goals-against; GAA = Goals-against average; SO = Shutouts; SA = Shots against; SV = Shots saved;SV% = Save percentage;

== Awards and records ==
- Presidents' Trophy: New York Rangers
- Hart Memorial Trophy: Mark Messier
- James Norris Memorial Trophy: Brian Leetch
- Lester B. Pearson Award: Mark Messier
- Most assists, season – Brian Leetch (1991–92) – 80
- Most points by defenseman, season – Brian Leetch (1991–92) – 102

== Transactions ==
=== Trades ===
October 4, 1991	To Edmonton Oilers Bernie Nicholls; Steven Rice; Louie DeBrusk	To New York Rangers Mark Messier

== Draft picks ==
New York's picks at the 1991 NHL entry draft in Buffalo, New York at the Memorial Auditorium.

Round	#	Player	Position	Nationality	College/Junior/Club team (League)
1	15	Alexei Kovalev	RW	Soviet Union	Dynamo Moscow (Russia)
2	37	Darcy Werenka	D	Canada	Lethbridge Hurricanes (WHL)
5	96	Corey Machanic	D	United States	University of Vermont (ECAC)
6	125	Fredrik Jax	RW	Sweden	Leksands IF (Elitserien)
6	128	Barry Young	D	United Kingdom	Sudbury Wolves (OHL)
7	147	John Rushin	C	United States	Edina Kennedy High School (USHS-MN)
8	169	Corey Hirsch	G	Canada	Kamloops Blazers (WHL)
9	191	Vyacheslav Uvayev	D	Soviet Union	Spartak Moscow (Russia)
10	213	Jamie Ram	G	Canada	Michigan Technological University (WCHA)
11	235	Vitali Chinakhov	C	Soviet Union	Torpedo Yaroslavl (Russia)
12	257	Brian Wiseman	C	Canada	University of Michigan (CCHA)

=== Supplemental Draft ===
New York's picks at the 1991 NHL supplemental draft.

Player	Position	Nationality	College/Junior/Club team (League)
Steven King	RW	United States	Brown University (ECAC)
