= Chychrun =

Chychrun is a surname. Notable people with the surname include:

- Jakob Chychrun (born 1998), Canadian-American ice hockey player, son of Jeff
- Jeff Chychrun (born 1966), Canadian ice hockey player
