= Morris Belzberg =

Canadian born businessman (1929–2020)

Morris Belzberg (b. September 25, 1929 - d. May 2, 2020) was a Canadian-born businessman, who lived in the United States from approximately 1966. He was the owner of the Pittsburgh Penguins of the National Hockey League. He won the Stanley Cup with the team in 1992.

== Background ==
Belzberg was the chairman of Budget Rent a Car Corp from approximately 1968 to 1989. In 1965, he became Budget's first franchisee in Canada, before joining Budget's Canadian operation. In 1969, he moved to Chicago.

After leaving Budget in 1989, Belzberg acquired shares in the Minnesota North Stars. In 1991, he acquired 50 percent of the Pittsburgh Penguins. He sold his interest in the Penguins in 1997.

== Personal life ==
Belzberg had a winter home in Palm Springs, California. His wife, Cynthia Belzberg, died on December 31, 2004.
