= Yanick Dupré =

Canadian ice hockey player

- Born: November 20, 1972 Montreal, Quebec, Canada
- Died: August 16, 1997 (aged 24) Montreal, Quebec, Canada
- Height: 6 ft 0 in (183 cm)
- Weight: 189 lb (86 kg; 13 st 7 lb)
- Position: Left wing
- Shot: Left
- Played for: Philadelphia Flyers
- NHL draft: 50th overall, 1991; Philadelphia Flyers
- Playing career: 1992–1996

Joseph Jacques Yanick Dupré (November 20, 1972 – August 16, 1997) was a Canadian professional ice hockey left winger who played 35 games over parts of three seasons in the National Hockey League (NHL) for the Philadelphia Flyers. He died at the age of 24 after a 16-month battle with leukemia.

The Yanick Dupre Memorial Class Guy Award was named after him to honour his memory and is given to the Flyer who best illustrates character, dignity, and respect for the sport both on and off the ice. A similarly named award is also presented by the American Hockey League in recognition of a player's community service.

== Career statistics ==
| | | | Regular season | | | | | Playoffs |
| Season | Team | League | GP | G | A | Pts | PIM | GP | G | A | Pts | PIM |
|---|---|---|---|---|---|---|---|---|---|---|---|---|
| 1988–89 | Laval-Laurentides | QAAA | 37 | 13 | 21 | 34 | 39 | 2 | 0 | 2 | 2 | 2 |
| 1989–90 | Chicoutimi Saguenéens | QMJHL | 24 | 5 | 9 | 14 | 27 | — | — | — | — | — |
| 1989–90 | Drummondville Voltigeurs | QMJHL | 29 | 10 | 10 | 20 | 42 | — | — | — | — | — |
| 1990–91 | Drummondville Voltigeurs | QMJHL | 58 | 29 | 38 | 67 | 87 | 11 | 8 | 5 | 13 | 33 |
| 1991–92 | Philadelphia Flyers | NHL | 1 | 0 | 0 | 0 | 0 | — | — | — | — | — |
| 1991–92 | Drummondville Voltigeurs | QMJHL | 28 | 19 | 17 | 36 | 48 | — | — | — | — | — |
| 1991–92 | Verdun Collège Français | QMJHL | 12 | 7 | 14 | 21 | 21 | 19 | 9 | 9 | 18 | 20 |
| 1992–93 | Hershey Bears | AHL | 63 | 13 | 24 | 37 | 22 | — | — | — | — | — |
| 1993–94 | Hershey Bears | AHL | 51 | 22 | 20 | 42 | 42 | 8 | 1 | 3 | 4 | 2 |
| 1994–95 | Hershey Bears | AHL | 41 | 15 | 19 | 34 | 35 | — | — | — | — | — |
| 1994–95 | Philadelphia Flyers | NHL | 22 | 0 | 0 | 0 | 8 | — | — | — | — | — |
| 1995–96 | Hershey Bears | AHL | 52 | 20 | 36 | 56 | 81 | — | — | — | — | — |
| 1995–96 | Philadelphia Flyers | NHL | 12 | 2 | 0 | 2 | 8 | — | — | — | — | — |
| NHL totals | | | 35 | 2 | 0 | 2 | 16 | — | — | — | — | — |

== See also ==
- List of ice hockey players who died during their playing career
