= Dave Brown (ice hockey) =

Canadian ice hockey player (born 1962)

- Born: October 12, 1962 (age 64) Saskatoon, Saskatchewan, Canada
- Height: 6 ft 5 in (196 cm)
- Weight: 225 lb (102 kg; 16 st 1 lb)
- Position: Right wing
- Shot: Right
- Played for: Philadelphia Flyers; Edmonton Oilers; San Jose Sharks
- NHL draft: 140th overall, 1982; Philadelphia Flyers
- Playing career: 1982–1996

David James Brown (born October 12, 1962) is a Canadian former professional ice hockey right winger who played 14 seasons in the National Hockey League (NHL) for the Philadelphia Flyers, Edmonton Oilers and San Jose Sharks. He was primarily known as an enforcer throughout his career. He is currently the Flyers' head of pro scouting.

== Playing career ==
Brown was suspended for 15 games for cross-checking New York Rangers forward Tomas Sandström, breaking his jaw and causing a concussion. At that time, it was among the stiffest penalties in NHL history. Brown's name was engraved on the Stanley Cup in 1990 with Edmonton. He is known to be one of the greatest enforcers and fighters in NHL history, ranked at #2 only behind Bob Probert.

== Awards ==
- 1989–90 - NHL - Stanley Cup (Edmonton)

== Career statistics ==
			Regular season					Playoffs
Season	Team	League	GP	G	A	Pts	PIM	GP	G	A	Pts	PIM
1980–81	Spokane Flyers	WHL	9	2	2	4	21	—	—	—	—	—
1981–82	Saskatoon Blades	WHL	62	11	33	44	344	5	1	0	1	4
1982–83	Maine Mariners	AHL	71	8	6	14	418	16	0	0	0	107
1982–83	Philadelphia Flyers	NHL	2	0	0	0	5	—	—	—	—	—
1983–84	Springfield Indians	AHL	59	17	14	31	150	—	—	—	—	—
1983–84	Philadelphia Flyers	NHL	19	1	5	6	98	2	0	0	0	12
1984–85	Philadelphia Flyers	NHL	57	3	6	9	165	11	0	0	0	59
1985–86	Philadelphia Flyers	NHL	76	10	7	17	277	5	0	0	0	16
1986–87	Philadelphia Flyers	NHL	62	7	3	10	274	26	1	2	3	59
1987–88	Philadelphia Flyers	NHL	47	12	5	17	114	7	1	0	1	27
1988–89	Philadelphia Flyers	NHL	50	0	3	3	100	—	—	—	—	—
1988–89	Edmonton Oilers	NHL	22	0	2	2	56	7	0	0	0	6
1989–90	Edmonton Oilers	NHL	60	0	6	6	145	3	0	0	0	0
1990–91	Edmonton Oilers	NHL	58	3	4	7	160	16	0	1	1	30
1991–92	Philadelphia Flyers	NHL	70	4	2	6	81	—	—	—	—	—
1992–93	Philadelphia Flyers	NHL	70	0	2	2	78	—	—	—	—	—
1993–94	Philadelphia Flyers	NHL	71	1	4	5	137	—	—	—	—	—
1994–95	Philadelphia Flyers	NHL	28	1	2	3	53	3	0	0	0	0
1995–96	San Jose Sharks	NHL	37	3	1	4	46	—	—	—	—	—
NHL totals			729	45	52	97	1789	80	2	3	5	209
