= Ken Wregget =

Canadian ice hockey player (born 1964)

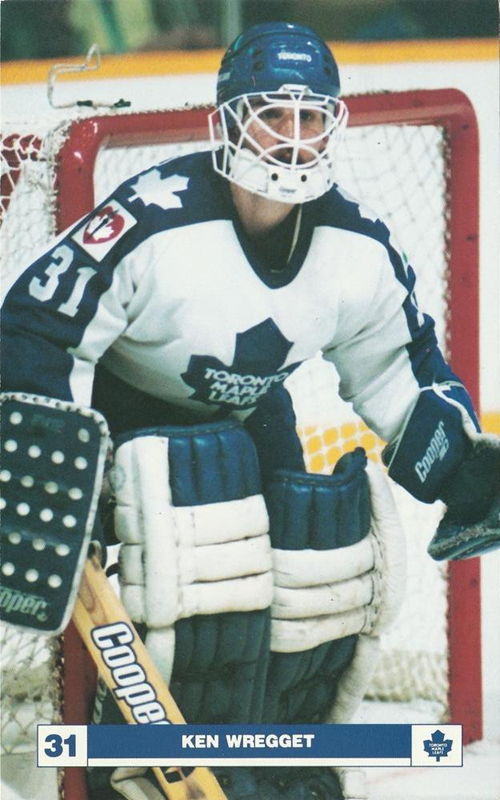
- Wregget for 1987 postcard
- Born: March 25, 1964 (age 62) Brandon, Manitoba, Canada
- Height: 6 ft 1 in (185 cm)
- Weight: 205 lb (93 kg; 14 st 9 lb)
- Position: Goaltender
- Caught: Left
- Played for: Toronto Maple Leafs; Philadelphia Flyers; Pittsburgh Penguins; Calgary Flames; Detroit Red Wings
- National team: Canada
- NHL draft: 45th overall, 1982; Toronto Maple Leafs
- Playing career: 1984–2001

Kenneth Lee Wregget (born March 25, 1964) is a Canadian former professional ice hockey goaltender.

His professional hockey career spans nearly 20 years, playing in the National Hockey League (NHL) for the Toronto Maple Leafs, Philadelphia Flyers, Pittsburgh Penguins, Calgary Flames, and Detroit Red Wings.

He won the Stanley Cup in 1992 while with the Pittsburgh Penguins, serving as backup to Tom Barrasso.

== Playing career ==
Wregget played for three seasons with the Lethbridge Broncos of the Western Hockey League (WHL) and won the WHL Top Goaltender Award in 1984. In 1983, he joined the St. Catharines Saints, the American Hockey League affiliate of the Toronto Maple Leafs, after the Maple Leafs selected him in the third round of the 1982 NHL entry draft, 45th overall. He split time for two seasons between St. Catharines and the Maple Leafs.

=== Toronto Maple Leafs ===
He made his NHL debut during the 1983-84 season while still playing junior with the Lethbridge Hurricanes suiting up for three games for the Maple Leafs. He turned a lot of heads during his first game in the league posting a jaw-dropping 48-save performance against the Hartford Whalers to record his first NHL victory. He then split time the next two seasons between St. Catharines and the Maple Leafs. In 1984–85 he played 23 games for the Leafs while Tim Bernhardt handled the bulk of the work. He then got into 30 games the next year as part of a three-netminder carousel that also featured Bernhardt and veteran Don Edwards. The 1986–87 season was his first full year in the NHL with Wregget taking over the starting duties for the Maple Leafs with another youngster, Allan Bester, completing the tandem. The following year the Leafs used the same pair for the bulk of the work with Wregget appearing in 56 games for the second consecutive season. In 1988–89, Bester, like he had the year before, posted better numbers than him, and the Maple Leafs decided to go with Bester. Wregget was traded to the Philadelphia Flyers in exchange for a pair of first round draft picks in the 1989 NHL entry draft, and he joined incumbent Ron Hextall in the Philadelphia crease.

=== Philadelphia Flyers ===
During Wregget's first full year with the team, starting goaltender Ron Hextall battled a series of injuries and was limited to just eight games, pushing Wregget into carrying the load. Wregget played 51 games for Philadelphia before resuming the back up role the following season when Hextall returned to health. In 1991–92, with youngster Dominic Roussel impressing during an extended look from the Flyers, Wregget was shipped to the cross-state rival Pittsburgh Penguins as part of a blockbuster transaction, along with Kjell Samuelsson and Rick Tocchet in exchange for Mark Recchi.

=== Pittsburgh Penguins ===
Wregget was generally backup to Penguins goaltender Tom Barrasso, although Wregget was regarded as a solid goaltender in his own right and played well in long stretches over the next few years when the oft injured Barrasso missed time. Wregget won his only career Stanley Cup as a member of the 1992 Penguins.

Wregget's best season came in 1994–95 when he played in 38 games and compiled a 25–9–2 record with a 3.21 goals against average and a .903 save percentage while also leading the NHL in wins. In 1996, he faced the first penalty shot ever awarded during an overtime period in NHL playoff history. He stopped Washington Capitals star Joé Juneau, extending what was the third-longest game in NHL history, the longest game since 1936. The Penguins finally won 3–2 in the fourth overtime period.

Wregget also shared a majority of the work for the Penguins during the 1996–97 season with Barrasso again injured, going 17-17-6 and getting all five playoff starts for the Penguins that season. In 1997–98 with Barrasso healthy (and having a career year himself) and the emergence of Peter Skudra and Jean-Sébastien Aubin as legitimate back-up options, Wregget was made expendable and thus traded to the Calgary Flames after the 1998 season ended with Dave Roche for German Titov and Todd Hlushko. Despite generally being the back-up in Pittsburgh, he still as of 2015 ranks fourth in Penguins' history in games played 212 (behind Marc-André Fleury, Barrasso, and Denis Herron), third in wins with 104 (behind Fleury and Barrasso), and tied for fifth in shutouts with 6 (behind Fleury, Barrasso, Les Binkley, Johan Hedberg, and tied with Aubin).

=== Calgary Flames ===
In Calgary, Wregget provided veteran leadership in goal during a season of transition. The 34-year old Wregget was one of six netminders to suit up for the Flames that year with many of them getting their first taste of NHL action including young Jean-Sébastien Giguère, who would go on to have a sixteen-year career in the NHL. Wregget played 27 games for the Flames – one off the team lead – and posted 10 wins for the club. His 2.53 goals against average represented the best mark of his career. At season's end, he was a free agent and left the club to take one more shot at the Stanley Cup.

=== Detroit Red Wings ===
As an unrestricted free agent for the first time in his career, Wregget signed a two-year deal with the powerful Detroit Red Wings where he backed-up Chris Osgood. Wregget won 14 games for the Wings and posted a 2.66 goals against average. However, in 2000 he lost the backup job to Manny Legace, and so he and the Red Wings reached a deal to send him to the IHL.

=== Manitoba Moose ===
Wregget, who was born in Brandon, Manitoba, played his final season of professional hockey with the Manitoba Moose of the International Hockey League after the Red Wings loaned the veteran netminder to the club. With the Moose Wregget shared the goaltending duties with Johan Hedberg who would jump to the NHL and join Wregget's former club, the Pittsburgh Penguins for a surprising playoff run. Wregget won 11 games for Manitoba and posted a team-best two shutouts before hanging up his pads for good at seasons end.

In 2009, he was inducted into the Manitoba Hockey Hall of Fame.

== Personal life ==
Wregget lived in Cold Lake, Alberta, for a period of time while growing up and attended Grand Centre High School.

He and his ex-wife have a daughter, Courtney, and a son, Matthew.

He is the owner of "31" Bar and Grille in Collier Township, Pennsylvania.

== Career statistics ==
=== Regular season and playoffs ===
			Regular season									Playoffs
Season	Team	League	GP	W	L	T	MIN	GA	SO	GAA	SV%	GP	W	L	MIN	GA	SO	GAA	SV%
1981–82	Lethbridge Broncos	WHL	36	19	12	0	1713	118	1	4.13	—	3	2	0	84	3	0	2.14	—
1982–83	Lethbridge Broncos	WHL	48	26	17	1	2696	157	1	3.49	—	20	14	5	1154	58	1	3.02	—
1983–84	Lethbridge Broncos	WHL	53	32	20	0	3053	161	0	3.16	—	4	1	3	210	18	0	5.14	—
1983–84	Toronto Maple Leafs	NHL	3	1	1	1	165	14	0	5.09	.891	—	—	—	—	—	—	—	—
1984–85	Toronto Maple Leafs	NHL	23	2	15	3	1278	103	0	4.84	.863	—	—	—	—	—	—	—	—
1984–85	St. Catharines Saints	AHL	12	2	8	1	688	48	0	4.19	.865	—	—	—	—	—	—	—	—
1985–86	St. Catharines Saints	AHL	18	8	9	0	1058	78	1	4.42	.863	—	—	—	—	—	—	—	—
1985–86	Toronto Maple Leafs	NHL	30	9	13	4	1566	113	0	4.33	.875	10	6	4	607	32	1	3.16	.901
1986–87	Toronto Maple Leafs	NHL	56	22	28	3	3026	200	0	3.97	.875	13	7	6	761	29	1	2.29	.921
1987–88	Toronto Maple Leafs	NHL	56	12	35	4	3000	222	2	4.44	.870	2	0	1	108	11	0	6.11	.823
1988–89	Toronto Maple Leafs	NHL	32	9	20	2	1888	139	0	4.42	.866	—	—	—	—	—	—	—	—
1988–89	Philadelphia Flyers	NHL	3	1	1	0	130	13	0	6.00	.822	5	2	2	268	10	0	2.24	.928
1989–90	Philadelphia Flyers	NHL	51	22	24	3	2961	169	0	3.42	.892	—	—	—	—	—	—	—	—
1990–91	Philadelphia Flyers	NHL	30	10	14	3	1484	88	0	3.56	.867	—	—	—	—	—	—	—	—
1991–92	Philadelphia Flyers	NHL	23	9	8	3	1259	75	0	3.57	.865	—	—	—	—	—	—	—	—
1991–92	Pittsburgh Penguins	NHL	9	5	3	0	448	31	0	4.15	.847	1	0	0	40	4	0	6.00	.750
1992–93	Pittsburgh Penguins	NHL	25	13	7	2	1368	78	0	3.42	.887	—	—	—	—	—	—	—	—
1993–94	Pittsburgh Penguins	NHL	42	21	12	7	2456	138	1	3.37	.893	—	—	—	—	—	—	—	—
1994–95	Pittsburgh Penguins	NHL	38	25	9	2	2208	118	0	3.21	.903	11	5	6	661	33	1	3.00	.905
1995–96	Pittsburgh Penguins	NHL	37	20	13	2	2132	115	3	3.24	.905	9	7	2	598	23	0	2.31	.930
1996–97	Pittsburgh Penguins	NHL	46	17	17	6	2514	136	2	3.25	.902	5	1	4	297	18	0	3.64	.915
1997–98	Pittsburgh Penguins	NHL	15	3	6	2	611	28	0	2.75	.904	—	—	—	—	—	—	—	—
1998–99	Calgary Flames	NHL	27	10	12	4	1590	67	1	2.53	.906	—	—	—	—	—	—	—	—
1999–00	Detroit Red Wings	NHL	29	14	10	2	1579	70	0	2.66	.900	—	—	—	—	—	—	—	—
2000–01	Manitoba Moose	IHL	30	11	13	4	1602	72	2	2.70	.900	12	6	5	774	30	0	2.33	.915
NHL totals			575	225	248	53	31,663	1917	9	3.63	.885	56	28	25	3340	160	3	2.87	.911

== Awards ==
- WHL East First All-Star Team – 1984
- WHL Top Goaltender Award – 1984
- Stanley Cup Champion - 1992
