= Jakob Chychrun =

Canadian ice hockey player (born 1998)

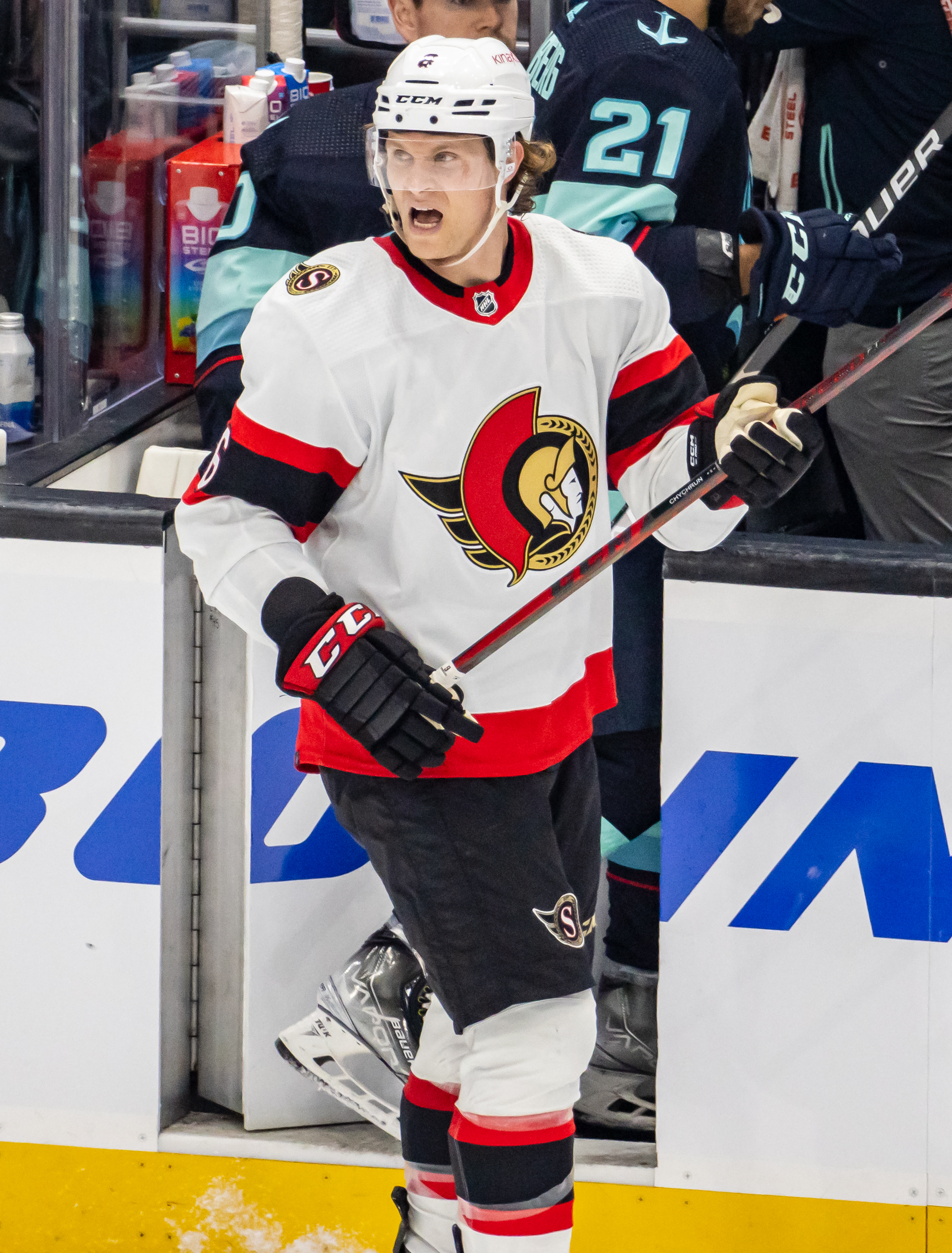
- Chychrun with the Ottawa Senators in 2023
- Born: March 31, 1998 (age 28) Boca Raton, Florida, U.S.
- Height: 6 ft 2 in (188 cm)
- Weight: 215 lb (98 kg; 15 st 5 lb)
- Position: Defense
- Shoots: Left
- NHL team Former teams: Washington Capitals; Arizona Coyotes; Ottawa Senators
- NHL draft: 16th overall, 2016; Arizona Coyotes
- Playing career: 2016–present

Jakob Chychrun (/ˈtʃɪkrən/ CHIK-rən; born March 31, 1998) is a Canadian–American professional ice hockey player who is a defenseman for the Washington Capitals of the National Hockey League (NHL). He was drafted 16th overall by the Arizona Coyotes at the 2016 NHL entry draft. He has also played for the Ottawa Senators.

== Early and personal life ==
Chychrun was born and raised in Boca Raton, Florida. His father, Jeff, is a former defenseman who played for eight seasons in the NHL. He is also the nephew of Luke Richardson, a former NHL defenseman and former head coach of the Chicago Blackhawks. His mother is Nancy Chychrun, and he has a sister, Taylor. He is a dual American–Canadian citizen. His surname is from his Ukrainian ancestry. His father is Catholic and his mother is Jewish. Chychrun identifies as a passionate Christian and regularly attends a Bible study he started in 2024 with Capitals teammates.

He attended American Heritage School in Delray Beach from Pre-kindergarten to ninth grade. After his cousin Daron died by suicide, Chychrun got involved in the 'Do It For Daron' movement to raise awareness and spark conversations about suicide and youth mental health.

Chychrun is outspoken on eating an "ancestral diet," which involves raw meat and milk, as well as eating foods seasonally. In August 2024, Chychrun donated $326.00 to Robert F. Kennedy Jr.’s 2024 campaign for president.

== Playing career ==
=== Amateur ===
==== Minor hockey ====
Chychrun started playing hockey in his home state of Florida with the Junior Everblades and the Florida Jr. Panthers organizations. When Chychrun was 13, he joined the Little Caesars hockey organization in Detroit, Michigan, where he played very well during his major bantam season. At the time, he continued living and practising in Florida, travelling to Michigan on the weekends to play. The following season he remained with Little Caesars, playing for their U16 team.

In 2013, Chychrun was drafted by the Youngstown Phantoms in the USHL draft. USA Hockey implemented a rule requiring 15-year-old players to receive a special exemption to play junior hockey. Chychrun applied for one but was denied. As a result, Chychrun played his minor midget season for the Toronto Jr. Canadiens in the Greater Toronto Hockey League.

==== Major junior ====
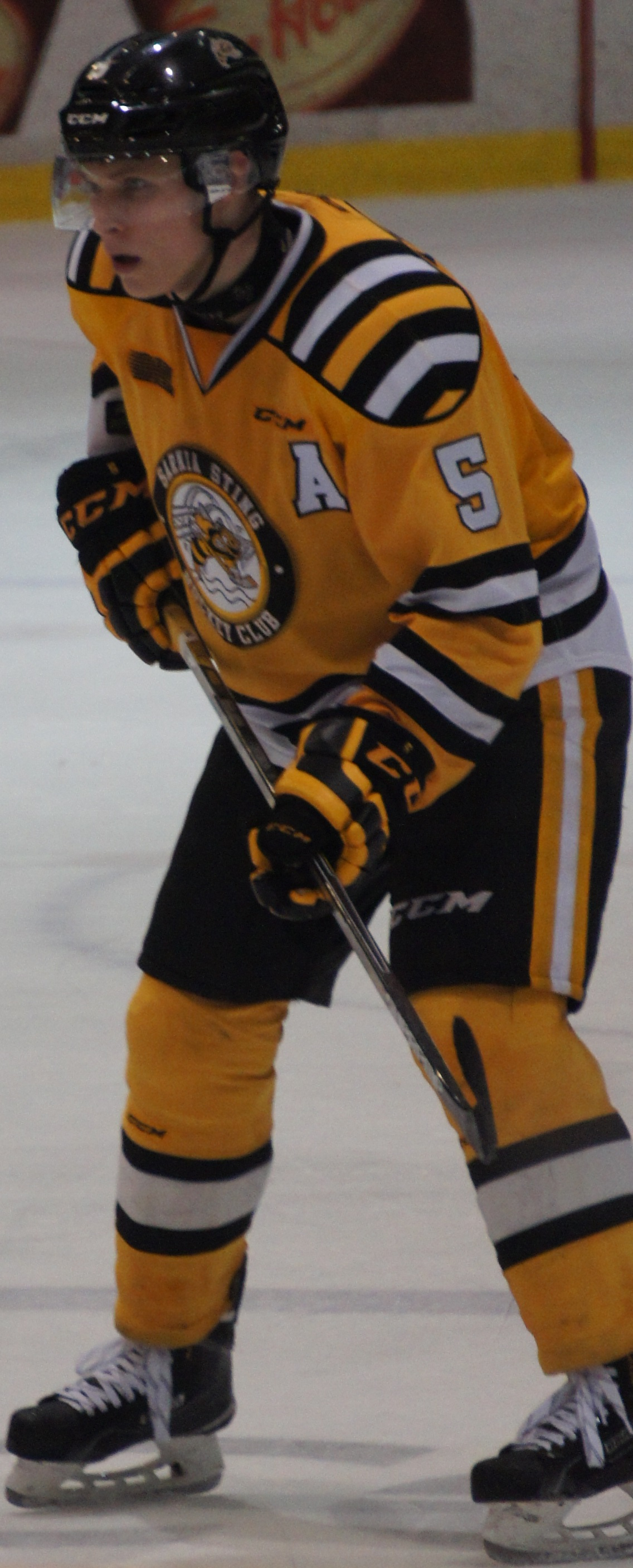
Chychrun during his tenure with the Sarnia Sting.

Following his outstanding GTHL season, Chychrun was selected first overall by the Sarnia Sting in the 2014 OHL Priority Selection. He played 12 games with the Sting during the 2014–15 season before suffering a shoulder injury. He subsequently missed eight weeks, including the 2014 World Under-17 Hockey Challenge, before returning to the lineup on December 19. As a member of the Sting, Chychrun attended Northern Collegiate Institute and Vocational School and was recognized as the West Division Academic Player of the Month for November 2014. Upon returning from his injury, Chychrun tallied five goals and ten points through his first eight games. In January, Chychrun was named an alternate captain alongside Stephen Pierog and Daniel Nikandrov. Despite missing 22 games, Chychrun quickly tallied 22 points in 26 games played to rank in the 13 in OHL rookie scoring by February 3. He finished the season with 16 goals and 33 points through 42 games to earn nominations for the Emms Family Award, the Max Kaminsky Trophy, and the Red Tilson Trophy. He was also voted onto the 2014–15 OHL All-Rookie First Team. He earned these honours despite missing the final 26 games of the regular season and the OHL 2015 playoffs because of an upper-body injury.

Chychrun returned to the Sting for the 2015–16 season as an alternate captain. By October 21, Chychrun had registered one goal, five assists, and a plus-6 rating through his first 10 games and was selected to participate in the 2015 CHL Canada-Russia Series. In his first year as a draft-eligible player, Chychrun received an A rating from NHL Central Scouting Bureau in November and was expected to be one of the top three players picked at the 2016 NHL entry draft. He was eventually drafted by the Arizona Coyotes in the first round, sixteenth overall. This was far lower than expected; prior to the start of the 2015–16 season, Chychrun was regarded as a top three selection.

=== Professional ===
==== Arizona Coyotes ====
On July 30, 2016, Chychrun concluded his OHL career and signed a three-year, NHL entry-level contract with the Coyotes. Following the signing, he was one of 29 prospects who participated in the Coyotes 2016–17 Rookie Camp at Gila River Arena. After impressing at the rookie camp, he participated in the Coyotes preseason. During his first two preseason games, he averaged 22 minutes of ice time and played a physical game while also tallying points. Due to his impressive play, Chychrun subsequently became the youngest player in Coyotes history to make his NHL debut with the team at 18 years and 198 days. As a result of his age, Chychrun would not be eligible to play in the American Hockey League (AHL) for the 2016–17 season if the Coyotes wished to move him. On October 15, 2016, Chychrun became the third-youngest player to skate in a game for the Coyotes/Winnipeg Jets franchise. He tallied his first career NHL point, an assist, in his debut game to lift the Coyotes to a 4–3 win over the Philadelphia Flyers. After playing 12:09 in the season opener, he was a healthy scratch for the second game. Chychrun later scored his first NHL goal on October 20, 2016, against Carey Price of the Montreal Canadiens. He finished the month of October with one goal and two assists through his first seven NHL games. After a month with the Coyotes, the Coyotes announced Chychrun would remain with the team for the rest of the season. Chychrun often played on the third defense pair with Luke Schenn. In December, Chychrun missed one game due to an upper-body injury but played 17:23 in his return to the lineup on December 27. Chychrun continued to be made a healthy scratch throughout the season and he sat out four consecutive games in early to mid-February. Following these scratches, he improved offensively and notched a goal and two assists for his first three-point game on March 11. This increased his points tally to six goals in 54 games and ranked him second among first-year defensemen. He later scored his seventh goal of the season on March 16 to extend the Coyotes points streak to five games. Chychrun finished his rookie season tied for second among first-year NHL defensemen with seven goals and seventh for points with 20. He subsequently became the first Coyotes rookie defenseman since 2005–06 to score this many points, which was also the third highest by a rookie defenseman in team history. He also ranked fifth on the team with 99 blocked shots.

During the 2017 off-season, Chychrun underwent knee surgery after suffering an injury during off-season training. Following the surgery, he went to Philadelphia for rehabbing and returned to skating and full practice in mid-October. Despite this, he was assigned to the Coyotes' AHL affiliate, the Tucson Roadrunners for conditioning purposes on November 28. He did not play a game for the Roadrunners before being recalled to the NHL level on December 3. He made his NHL season debut that night, scoring a goal in 22:40 minutes of ice time in a 3–2 loss to the Vegas Golden Knights. Chychrun subsequently tallied four goals and ten assists through 50 games while averaging 20:15 of ice time. His season was cut short again after he was ruled out for the remainder of the season on April 4 after suffering a torn ACL.

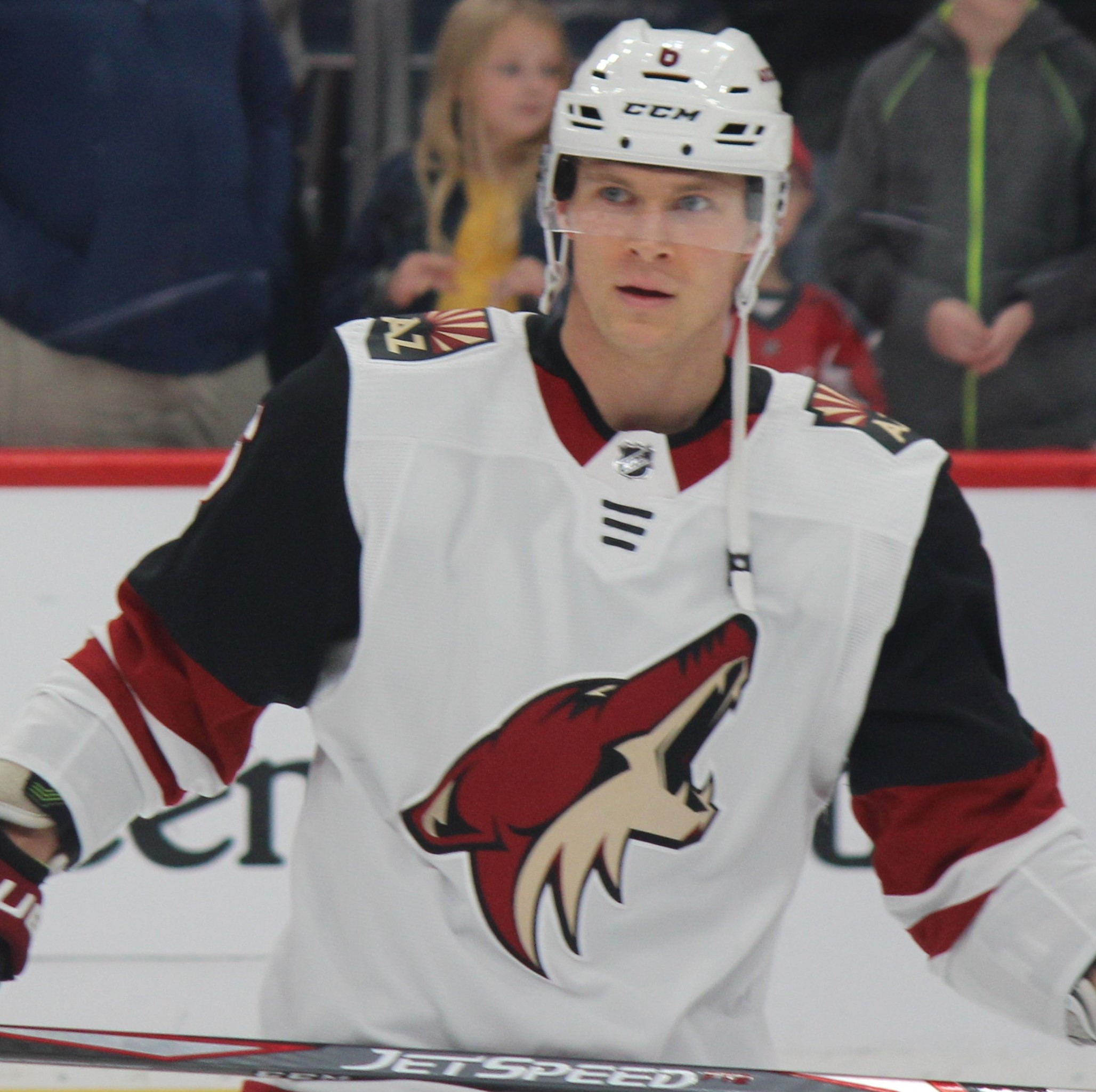
Chychrun with the Arizona Coyotes in 2019

Chychrun underwent surgery to repair his torn ACL in the 2018 off-season but was ruled eligible to play for the 2018–19 season. Prior to his season debut on November 13, the Coyotes signed Chychrun to a six-year contract extension. He returned to the lineup that night but failed to help his team beat the Detroit Red Wings. Following the game, the Coyotes maintained an 8–8–1 record after beginning the season with five straight wins. However, his return was short-lived as he suffered another upper-body injury before his second game of the season. Chychrun scored an assist in his return to the lineup on November 21 as the Coyotes fell to the Golden Knights in overtime. He also missed four more games in late January and early February due to a lower-body injury. Despite missing 22 games, Chychrun ranked fourth among Arizona defensemen with 11 points by February 9. As the season continued, Chychrun served as a healthy scratch for numerous games. He finished the season tying his career high with 20 points through 53 games as the Coyotes failed to qualify for the 2019 Stanley Cup playoffs.

During the 2019 off-season, Chychrun spent one month in Florida and then the rest of the summer at a cottage just outside of Ottawa. As he was battling tendinitis in his knee, he took off a month to let it recover before starting training. For the second time in his NHL career, Chychrun was named to the Coyotes' opening night roster for the 2019–20 season. He played in his 200th career NHL game in a 4–2 win over the Columbus Blue Jackets on December 3. The team continued to improve and they climbed to the top of the Pacific Division in early December with 38 points. By February 11, Chychrun had maintained a career-best four game point streak and tied for fifth on the team in goals scored. He also ranked eighth among NHL defenseman in goals scored with 12 and tied for second in power play goals scored with five. This quickly accumulated into seven points through eight games in February before he suffered a lower-body injury on February 20. He subsequently missed seven games before the NHL paused play due to the COVID-19 pandemic. At the time of the pause, Chychrun had tallied a career-high 12 goals and 26 points through 63 games. When the season resumed, Chychrun was healthy enough to join the Coyotes for the 2020 Stanley Cup Qualifiers against the Nashville Predators. Prior to the start of the Qualifiers, Coyotes general manager and president of hockey operations John Chayka quit and was replaced by his assistant, Steve Sullivan. Chychrun made his NHL postseason debut in Game 1 as the Coyotes beat the Predators 4–3. The Coyotes swept the Predators in four games to advance to the Western Conference Quarterfinals against the Colorado Avalanche. The Coyotes were eventually eliminated by the Avalanche in five games.

Due to the COVID-19 pandemic, the 2020–21 NHL season was shortened and it started in January. For the second straight season, Chychrun was named to the Coyotes opening night roster as a healthy player. Chychrun began the season strong, registering four multi-point games by February 22 to rank second in scoring among West Division defensemen with 13 points. By March 9, he had tallied his seventh goal of the season to rank third among NHL defensemen across the league. Later that month, he became the second youngest defenseman in Coyotes history to record 100 points with the team. On April 4, Chychrun scored his first career hat trick in a 3–2 overtime victory against the Anaheim Ducks. He thus became the third defenseman in NHL history to score all three of his team's goals with the third coming in overtime. After adding two assists the following game, Chychrun set a new single season, career-high in points with 27. Later in April, he led all NHL defensemen with 14 goals, one more than Darnell Nurse of the Edmonton Oilers. Chychrun finished the season leading all defensemen with 18 goals and tied for 10th in points in 56 games. He finished 10th in the James Norris Memorial Trophy voting, an award given to the league’s best defenseman.

==== Ottawa Senators ====
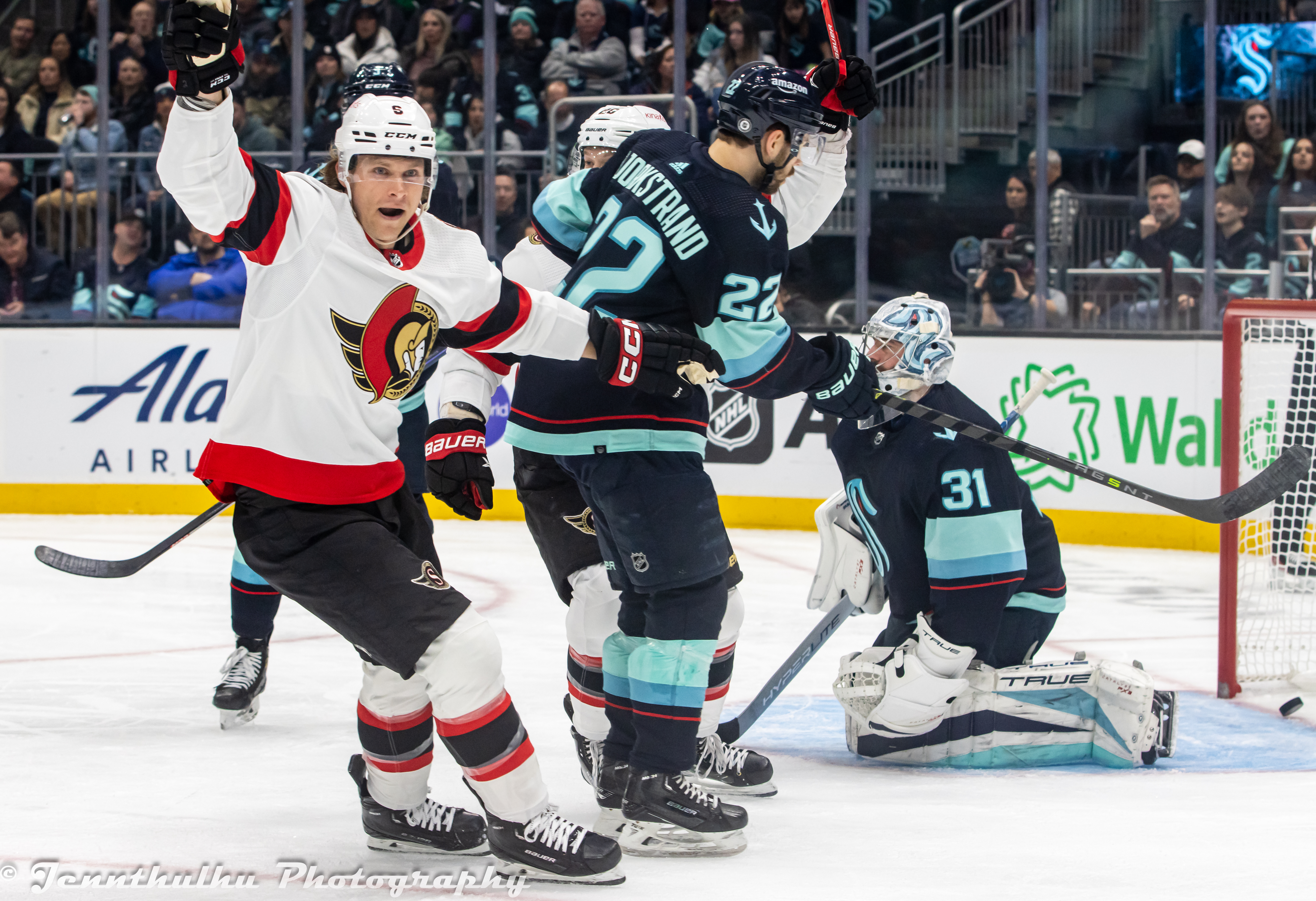
Chychrun with the Ottawa Senators scoring on Philipp Grubauer of the Seattle Kraken in 2023

On March 1, 2023, the Coyotes traded Chychrun to the Ottawa Senators in exchange for a conditional first-round pick in the 2023 NHL entry draft, a conditional second-round pick in the 2024 NHL entry draft, and a second-round pick in the 2026 NHL entry draft. On March 25 in a game against the Tampa Bay Lightning, Chychrun was injured falling into the boards. Initially, it was thought he would miss only a couple of weeks, but ended up missing the rest of the season. In his first full year with the Senators, Chychrun scored 14 goals and 41 points, matching his career high. He played in all 82 games for Ottawa, leading all of the Senators' defensemen in scoring.

==== Washington Capitals ====
On July 1, 2024, the Senators traded Chychrun to the Washington Capitals in exchange for defenseman Nick Jensen and a third-round pick in the 2026 NHL entry draft. Chychrun made his debut in the season opening game on October 12 against the New Jersey Devils, which they lost 5–3. He scored his first goal in a Capitals uniform in the following game, a 4–2 victory over the Vegas Golden Knights on October 15. He missed time at the end of October and early November after suffering an upper body injury in a game versus the New York Rangers on October 29. He was placed on injured reserve on November 2. He returned on November 9 and recorded a three-point game on November 25 in a 4–1 win over the Florida Panthers, scoring the game-winning goal and adding two assists. On March 25, 2025, Chychrun agreed to an eight-year, $72 million contract extension with the Capitals, carrying an average annual value of $9 million.

On November 5, 2025, Chychrun recorded the only assist on Alexander Ovechkin's 900th career goal, helping him become the first player in NHL history to reach that milestone.

== International play ==
Chychrun competed with Team Ontario at the 2014 World U-17 Hockey Challenge where he scored four points in five games. He was the first minor midget player to play for Team Ontario at the tournament.

== Career statistics ==
=== Regular season and playoffs ===
| | | | Regular season | | | | | Playoffs |
| Season | Team | League | GP | G | A | Pts | PIM | GP | G | A | Pts | PIM |
|---|---|---|---|---|---|---|---|---|---|---|---|---|
| 2013–14 | Toronto Jr. Canadiens | GTHL | 29 | 16 | 27 | 43 | 28 | 14 | 5 | 8 | 13 | 16 |
| 2014–15 | Sarnia Sting | OHL | 42 | 16 | 17 | 33 | 37 | — | — | — | — | — |
| 2015–16 | Sarnia Sting | OHL | 62 | 11 | 38 | 49 | 51 | 7 | 2 | 6 | 8 | 8 |
| 2016–17 | Arizona Coyotes | NHL | 68 | 7 | 13 | 20 | 47 | — | — | — | — | — |
| 2017–18 | Arizona Coyotes | NHL | 50 | 4 | 10 | 14 | 16 | — | — | — | — | — |
| 2018–19 | Arizona Coyotes | NHL | 53 | 5 | 15 | 20 | 28 | — | — | — | — | — |
| 2019–20 | Arizona Coyotes | NHL | 63 | 12 | 14 | 26 | 38 | 9 | 1 | 0 | 1 | 8 |
| 2020–21 | Arizona Coyotes | NHL | 56 | 18 | 23 | 41 | 42 | — | — | — | — | — |
| 2021–22 | Arizona Coyotes | NHL | 47 | 7 | 14 | 21 | 47 | — | — | — | — | — |
| 2022–23 | Arizona Coyotes | NHL | 36 | 7 | 21 | 28 | 22 | — | — | — | — | — |
| 2022–23 | Ottawa Senators | NHL | 12 | 2 | 3 | 5 | 8 | — | — | — | — | — |
| 2023–24 | Ottawa Senators | NHL | 82 | 14 | 27 | 41 | 60 | — | — | — | — | — |
| 2024–25 | Washington Capitals | NHL | 74 | 20 | 27 | 47 | 52 | 10 | 3 | 2 | 5 | 6 |
| 2025–26 | Washington Capitals | NHL | 80 | 26 | 34 | 60 | 62 | — | — | — | — | — |
| NHL totals | | | 621 | 122 | 201 | 323 | 422 | 19 | 4 | 2 | 6 | 14 |

=== International ===
| Year | Team | Event | Result | GP | G | A | Pts | PIM |
|---|---|---|---|---|---|---|---|---|
| 2014 | Canada Ontario | U17 | 5th | 5 | 1 | 3 | 4 | 4 |
| 2016 | Canada | WJC18 | 4th | 7 | 1 | 3 | 4 | 8 |
| Junior totals | | | | 12 | 2 | 6 | 8 | 12 |

== Awards and honors ==
| Honors | Year | Ref |
|---|---|---|
| Jack Ferguson Award | 2014 | |

== See also ==
- List of select Jewish ice hockey players

Awards and achievements
| Preceded by Travis Konecny | Jack Ferguson Award; 2014 | Succeeded by David Levin |
| Preceded by Clayton Keller | Arizona Coyotes first-round draft pick 2016 | Succeeded by Pierre-Olivier Joseph |
