= Kris King =

Canadian ice hockey player (born 1966)

- Born: February 18, 1966 (age 60) Bracebridge, Ontario, Canada
- Height: 5 ft 11 in (180 cm)
- Weight: 202 lb (92 kg; 14 st 6 lb)
- Position: Left wing
- Shot: Left
- Played for: Detroit Red Wings; New York Rangers; Winnipeg Jets; Phoenix Coyotes; Toronto Maple Leafs; Chicago Blackhawks
- NHL draft: 80th overall, 1984; Washington Capitals
- Playing career: 1987–2000

Kristopher King (born February 18, 1966) is a Canadian former professional ice hockey forward who played 14 seasons in the National Hockey League (NHL) for the Detroit Red Wings, New York Rangers, Winnipeg Jets, Phoenix Coyotes, Toronto Maple Leafs, and the Chicago Blackhawks. He won the King Clancy Memorial Trophy in 1996. He also started the Kris King Hockey School summer camp in Gravenhurst, Ontario in 1987. He announced his retirement on December 3, 2000.

King now works for the National Hockey League as senior vice president of hockey operations for the NHL's central office in Toronto.

== Career statistics ==
			Regular season					Playoffs
Season	Team	League	GP	G	A	Pts	PIM	GP	G	A	Pts	PIM
1982–83	Gravenhurst Indians	GMOJHL	32	72	53	125	115	—	—	—	—	—
1983–84	Peterborough Petes	OHL	62	13	18	31	168	8	3	3	6	14
1984–85	Peterborough Petes	OHL	61	18	35	53	222	16	2	8	10	28
1985–86	Peterborough Petes	OHL	58	19	40	59	254	8	4	0	4	21
1986–87	Peterborough Petes	OHL	46	23	33	56	160	12	5	8	13	41
1986–87	Binghamton Whalers	AHL	7	0	0	0	18	—	—	—	—	—
1987–88	Detroit Red Wings	NHL	3	1	0	1	2	—	—	—	—	—
1987–88	Adirondack Red Wings	AHL	76	21	32	53	337	10	4	4	8	53
1988–89	Detroit Red Wings	NHL	55	2	3	5	168	2	0	0	0	2
1989–90	New York Rangers	NHL	68	6	7	13	286	10	0	1	1	38
1990–91	New York Rangers	NHL	72	11	14	25	154	6	2	0	2	36
1991–92	New York Rangers	NHL	79	10	9	19	224	13	4	1	5	14
1992–93	New York Rangers	NHL	30	0	3	3	67	—	—	—	—	—
1992–93	Winnipeg Jets	NHL	48	8	8	16	136	6	1	1	2	4
1993–94	Winnipeg Jets	NHL	83	4	8	12	205	—	—	—	—	—
1994–95	Winnipeg Jets	NHL	48	4	2	6	85	—	—	—	—	—
1995–96	Winnipeg Jets	NHL	81	9	11	20	151	5	0	1	1	4
1996–97	Phoenix Coyotes	NHL	81	3	11	14	185	7	0	0	0	17
1997–98	Toronto Maple Leafs	NHL	82	3	3	6	199	—	—	—	—	—
1998–99	Toronto Maple Leafs	NHL	67	2	2	4	105	17	1	1	2	25
1999–2000	Toronto Maple Leafs	NHL	39	2	4	6	55	1	0	0	0	2
1999–2000	Chicago Wolves	IHL	15	2	4	6	19	—	—	—	—	—
2000–01	Chicago Blackhawks	NHL	13	1	0	1	8	—	—	—	—	—
NHL totals			849	66	85	151	2,030	67	8	5	13	142

== See also ==
- List of NHL players with 2000 career penalty minutes

Preceded by Keith Tkachuk	Winnipeg Jets captain 1995–96	Succeeded by Atlanta Thrashers captains Kelly Buchberger
Preceded by Joe Nieuwendyk	Winner of the King Clancy Memorial Trophy; 1996	Succeeded by Trevor Linden
