= Randy Gilhen =

German-born Canadian ice hockey player

- Born: June 13, 1963 (age 63) Zweibrücken, West Germany
- Height: 5 ft 11 in (180 cm)
- Weight: 190 lb (86 kg; 13 st 8 lb)
- Position: Left wing
- Shot: Left
- Played for: Hartford Whalers; Winnipeg Jets; Pittsburgh Penguins; Los Angeles Kings; New York Rangers; Tampa Bay Lightning; Florida Panthers
- NHL draft: 109th overall, 1982; Hartford Whalers
- Playing career: 1979–1998

Randy Gilhen (born June 13, 1963) is a German-born Canadian former ice hockey forward. Gilhen played 457 games in the National Hockey League (NHL). As a member of the 1991 Pittsburgh Penguins, Gilhen was the first German-born player to win the Stanley Cup.

== Playing career ==
Gilhen started his National Hockey League career with the Hartford Whalers in 1982. He also played for the Winnipeg Jets, Pittsburgh Penguins, Los Angeles Kings, New York Rangers, Tampa Bay Lightning, and Florida Panthers. His last NHL season was the 1996 season, after which he played two seasons with the Manitoba Moose before retiring in 1998.

== Personal life ==
Born in Zweibrücken, West Germany, Gilhen grew up in Winnipeg, Manitoba.

== Career statistics ==
			Regular Season					Playoffs
Season	Team	League	GP	G	A	Pts	PIM	GP	G	A	Pts	PIM
1979–80	Saskatoon Blades	WHL	9	2	2	4	20	—	—	—	—	—
1980–81	Saskatoon Blades	WHL	68	10	5	15	154	—	—	—	—	—
1981–82	Saskatoon Blades	WHL	25	15	9	24	45	—	—	—	—	—
1981–82	Winnipeg Warriors	WHL	36	26	28	54	42	—	—	—	—	—
1982–83	Winnipeg Warriors	WHL	71	57	44	101	84	3	2	2	4	0
1982–83	Hartford Whalers	NHL	2	0	1	1	0	—	—	—	—	—
1982–83	Binghamton Whalers	AHL	—	—	—	—	—	5	2	0	2	2
1983–84	Binghamton Whalers	AHL	73	8	12	20	72	—	—	—	—	—
1984–85	Binghamton Whalers	AHL	18	3	3	6	9	8	4	1	5	16
1984–85	Salt Lake Golden Eagles	IHL	57	20	20	40	28	—	—	—	—	—
1985–86	Fort Wayne Komets	IHL	82	44	40	84	48	15	10	8	18	6
1986–87	Sherbrooke Canadiens	AHL	75	36	29	65	44	17	7	13	20	10
1986–87	Winnipeg Jets	NHL	2	0	0	0	0	—	—	—	—	—
1987–88	Moncton Hawks	AHL	68	40	47	87	51	—	—	—	—	—
1987–88	Winnipeg Jets	NHL	13	3	2	5	15	4	1	0	1	10
1988–89	Winnipeg Jets	NHL	64	5	3	8	38	—	—	—	—	—
1989–90	Pittsburgh Penguins	NHL	61	5	11	16	54	—	—	—	—	—
1990–91	Pittsburgh Penguins	NHL	72	15	10	25	51	16	1	0	1	14
1991–92	Los Angeles Kings	NHL	33	3	6	9	14	—	—	—	—	—
1991–92	New York Rangers	NHL	40	7	7	14	14	13	1	2	3	2
1992–93	New York Rangers	NHL	33	3	2	5	8	—	—	—	—	—
1992–93	Tampa Bay Lightning	NHL	11	0	2	2	6	—	—	—	—	—
1993–94	Winnipeg Jets	NHL	40	3	3	6	34	—	—	—	—	—
1993–94	Florida Panthers	NHL	20	4	4	8	16	—	—	—	—	—
1994–95	Winnipeg Jets	NHL	44	5	6	11	52	—	—	—	—	—
1995–96	Winnipeg Jets	NHL	22	2	3	5	12	—	—	—	—	—
1996–97	Manitoba Moose	IHL	79	21	24	45	101	—	—	—	—	—
1997–98	Manitoba Moose	IHL	22	4	2	6	14	—	—	—	—	—
NHL totals			457	55	60	115	314	33	3	2	5	26

== Awards and achievements ==
- Stanley Cup Championship (1991)
- "Honoured Member" of the Manitoba Hockey Hall of Fame
