= Jeff Chychrun =

Canadian ice hockey player (born 1966)

- Born: May 3, 1966 (age 59) LaSalle, Quebec, Canada
- Height: 6 ft 5 in (196 cm)
- Weight: 185 lb (84 kg; 13 st 3 lb)
- Position: Defence
- Shot: Right
- Played for: Philadelphia Flyers; Los Angeles Kings; Pittsburgh Penguins; Edmonton Oilers
- NHL draft: 37th overall, 1984; Philadelphia Flyers
- Playing career: 1986–1994

Jeff Chychrun (born May 3, 1966) is a Canadian former professional ice hockey defenceman who played eight seasons in the National Hockey League (NHL) with the Philadelphia Flyers, Los Angeles Kings, Pittsburgh Penguins and Edmonton Oilers.

== Playing career ==
Born in LaSalle, Quebec, Chychrun was drafted 37th overall in the 1984 NHL entry draft by the Philadelphia Flyers. He made his NHL debut in the 1986–87 season with the Flyers, and stayed with them until the 1990–91 season. He also spent time in the NHL with the Los Angeles Kings, Pittsburgh Penguins and Edmonton Oilers.

During the early 1990s, Chychrun was twice involved in blockbuster trades that saw the Los Angeles Kings acquire key members of the former Edmonton Oilers dynasty to play with Wayne Gretzky. In the 1991 off-season, Chychrun was traded along with Hall of Fame winger Jari Kurri to the Los Angeles Kings in exchange for Steve Duchesne, Steve Kasper and a 4th round draft pick. During the 1991-92 season, Chychrun was dealt again, this time to the Pittsburgh Penguins, along with defensemen Brian Benning and a 1st round draft pick in exchange for Paul Coffey.

He played 262 games over his NHL career. His name was engraved on the Stanley Cup in 1992 as a member of the Pittsburgh Penguins as he played the necessary number of games to get his name on the Cup despite not suiting up for them during their post-season run to the Cup.

== Personal life ==
Chychrun and his wife have two children and live in Boca Raton. Their son, Jakob, also plays in the NHL.

== Career statistics ==
			Regular season					Playoffs
Season	Team	League	GP	G	A	Pts	PIM	GP	G	A	Pts	PIM
1982–83	Nepean Raiders	CJHL	44	3	10	13	59	—	—	—	—	—
1983–84	Kingston Canadians	OHL	63	1	13	14	137	—	—	—	—	—
1984–85	Kingston Canadians	OHL	58	4	10	14	206	—	—	—	—	—
1985–86	Kingston Canadians	OHL	61	4	21	25	127	10	2	1	3	17
1985–86	Hershey Bears	AHL	—	—	—	—	—	4	0	1	1	9
1985–86	Kalamazoo Wings	IHL	—	—	—	—	—	3	1	0	1	0
1986–87	Hershey Bears	AHL	74	1	17	18	239	4	0	0	0	10
1986–87	Philadelphia Flyers	NHL	1	0	0	0	4	—	—	—	—	—
1987–88	Hershey Bears	AHL	55	0	5	5	210	12	0	2	2	44
1987–88	Philadelphia Flyers	NHL	3	0	0	0	4	—	—	—	—	—
1988–89	Philadelphia Flyers	NHL	80	1	4	5	245	19	0	2	2	65
1989–90	Philadelphia Flyers	NHL	79	2	7	9	248	—	—	—	—	—
1990–91	Philadelphia Flyers	NHL	36	0	6	6	105	—	—	—	—	—
1991–92	Los Angeles Kings	NHL	26	0	3	3	76	—	—	—	—	—
1991–92	Pittsburgh Penguins	NHL	17	0	1	1	35	—	—	—	—	—
1991–92	Phoenix Roadrunners	IHL	3	0	0	0	6	—	—	—	—	—
1992–93	Pittsburgh Penguins	NHL	1	0	0	0	2	—	—	—	—	—
1992–93	Phoenix Roadrunners	IHL	11	2	0	2	44	—	—	—	—	—
1992–93	Los Angeles Kings	NHL	17	0	1	1	23	—	—	—	—	—
1993–94	Edmonton Oilers	NHL	2	0	0	0	0	—	—	—	—	—
1993–94	Cape Breton Oilers	AHL	41	2	16	18	111	—	—	—	—	—
NHL totals			262	3	22	25	742	19	0	2	2	65
