= Kjell Samuelsson =

Swedish ice hockey player

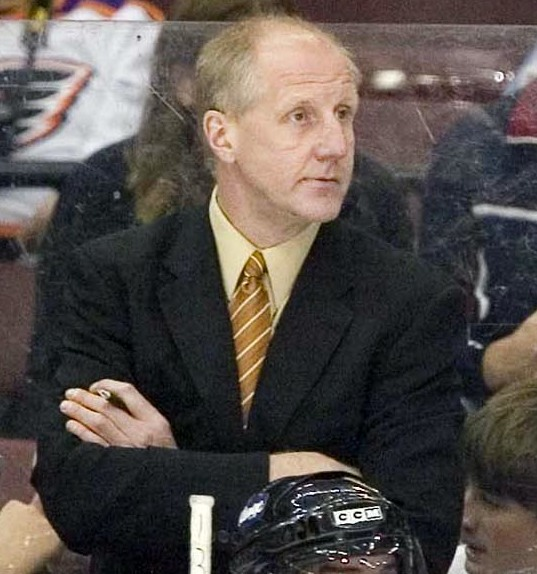
- Samuelsson in 2006
- Born: 18 October 1958 (age 68) Tingsryd, Sweden
- Height: 6 ft 6 in (198 cm)
- Weight: 235 lb (107 kg; 16 st 11 lb)
- Position: Defence
- Shot: Right
- Played for: Leksands IF; New York Rangers; Philadelphia Flyers; Pittsburgh Penguins; VEU Feldkirch; Tampa Bay Lightning
- National team: Sweden
- NHL draft: 119th overall, 1984; New York Rangers
- Playing career: 1976–1999

Kjell William Alf Samuelsson (born 18 October 1958) is a Swedish former professional ice hockey defenseman who played 14 seasons in the National Hockey League (NHL) with the New York Rangers, Philadelphia Flyers, Pittsburgh Penguins, and Tampa Bay Lightning between 1985 and 1999. On December 17, 2018 he was named interim assistant coach of the Lehigh Valley Phantoms of the AHL. He was then the Flyers' director of player development for ten years, before being fired on June 1, 2023.

== Playing career ==
Samuelsson was well into his professional career in his native Sweden when he was chosen 119th overall by the New York Rangers in the 1984 NHL entry draft. At age 26 he made the move to North America and spent the bulk of his first season with the Rangers organization with their American Hockey League affiliate in New Haven but did manage to get into nine NHL games. The following year he was a full-time NHLer but found himself on the move when New York traded him to the Philadelphia Flyers in exchange for netminder Bob Froese. With the Flyers, Samuelsson settled in and became a reliable defender and earned a spot on the All-Star team during the 1987-88 season. He won two Barry Ashbee Trophies (awarded to the Flyers top defensemen) before a deal late in the 1991-92 season sent him out of Philadelphia. The trade was a five-player blockbuster that landed him in Pittsburgh just in time to contribute to the second of back-to-back Stanley Cup Championships. The towering blueliner became an unrestricted free agent following the 1994-95 campaign and signed back with the Philadelphia Flyers. He spent the next three seasons with the Flyers but was only healthy for the first one and when his contract expired, the Flyers opted not to resign him. Samuelsson signed as a free agent with the Tampa Bay Lightning for the final season of his career then retired following the 1998–99 season. He was the last active NHL player to have been born in the 1950s.

Samuelsson played 813 career NHL games, scoring 48 goals and 138 assists for 186 points, as well as compiling 1,225 penalty minutes. Despite his surname and reputation as a physical defenseman, he is not related to former teammate Ulf Samuelsson.

== Coaching career ==
Upon his retirement, Samuelsson started his coaching career as an assistant with the ECHL's Trenton Titans in 1999-2000 before taking a similar role with the Flyers' AHL affiliate, the Philadelphia Phantoms, the following season. He served in that role for six seasons, winning the Calder Cup in 2005. On October 23, 2006, Samuelsson became the head coach of the Phantoms on a day where the Flyers released head coach Ken Hitchcock, promoted Flyers assistant (and former Phantoms head coach) John Stevens to head coach of the Flyers, and brought then-Phantoms coach Craig Berube to the Flyers as an assistant. Samuelsson returned to an assistant's role the following season when Berube returned to the Phantoms' head coaching position, and continued that for six more seasons - including four after the Phantoms relocated to Glens Falls, New York. In 2013, Samuelsson transitioned into a development coach for the Flyers, overseeing the team's drafted prospects at the amateur levels. On December 17, 2018 he was named interim assistant coach of the AHL Lehigh Valley Phantoms due to Scott Gordon being named interim head coach of the Philadelphia Flyers.

== Personal life ==
Samuelsson and his wife Vicki have four children. Both of his sons, Lukas and Mattias, played hockey for Western Michigan University. Mattias now plays for the Buffalo Sabres of the NHL, where he was drafted 32nd overall in the 2018 NHL entry draft. His daughter Allie is a game operations coordinator for the Philadelphia Flyers.

== Career statistics ==
=== Regular season and playoffs ===
			Regular season					Playoffs
Season	Team	League	GP	G	A	Pts	PIM	GP	G	A	Pts	PIM
1976–77	Tingsryds AIF	SWE-2	22	1	2	3	—	3	0	0	0	0
1977–78	Tingsryds AIF	SWE-2	20	3	0	3	41	4	1	0	1	4
1978–79	Tingsryds AIF	SWE-2	24	3	4	7	67	—	—	—	—	—
1979–80	Tingsryds AIF	SWE-2	26	5	4	9	45	—	—	—	—	—
1980–81	Tingsryds AIF	SWE-2	35	6	7	13	61	2	0	1	1	14
1981–82	Tingsryds AIF	SWE-2	33	11	14	25	68	3	0	2	2	2
1982–83	Tingsryds AIF	SWE-2	32	11	6	17	57	—	—	—	—	—
1983–84	Leksands IF	SWE	36	6	6	12	59	—	—	—	—	—
1984–85	Leksands IF	SWE	35	9	5	14	34	—	—	—	—	—
1985–86	New Haven Nighthawks	AHL	56	6	21	27	87	3	0	0	0	10
1985–86	New York Rangers	NHL	9	0	0	0	10	9	0	1	1	8
1986–87	New York Rangers	NHL	30	2	6	8	50	—	—	—	—	—
1986–87	Philadelphia Flyers	NHL	46	1	6	7	86	26	0	4	4	25
1987–88	Philadelphia Flyers	NHL	74	6	24	30	184	7	2	5	7	23
1988–89	Philadelphia Flyers	NHL	69	3	14	17	140	19	1	3	4	24
1989–90	Philadelphia Flyers	NHL	66	5	17	22	91	—	—	—	—	—
1990–91	Philadelphia Flyers	NHL	78	9	19	28	82	—	—	—	—	—
1991–92	Philadelphia Flyers	NHL	54	4	9	13	76	—	—	—	—	—
1991–92	Pittsburgh Penguins	NHL	20	1	2	3	34	15	0	3	3	12
1992–93	Pittsburgh Penguins	NHL	63	3	6	9	106	12	0	3	3	2
1993–94	Pittsburgh Penguins	NHL	59	5	8	13	118	6	0	0	0	26
1994–95	Pittsburgh Penguins	NHL	41	1	6	7	54	11	0	1	1	32
1995–96	Philadelphia Flyers	NHL	75	3	11	14	81	12	1	0	1	24
1996–97	Philadelphia Flyers	NHL	34	4	3	7	47	5	0	0	0	2
1997–98	Philadelphia Flyers	NHL	49	0	3	3	28	1	0	0	0	0
1998–99	Tampa Bay Lightning	NHL	46	1	4	5	38	—	—	—	—	—
1998–99	VEU Feldkirch	AUT	6	1	1	2	4	—	—	—	—	—
NHL totals			813	48	138	186	1225	123	4	20	24	178

=== International ===
Year	Team	Event	Results	GP	G	A	Pts	PIM
1991	Sweden	WC	1st place, gold medalist(s)	10	2	2	4	12
1991	Sweden	CC	SF	6	1	0	1	16
Senior totals				16	3	2	5	28
