= 1988–89 NHL transactions =

The following is a list of all team-to-team transactions that have occurred in the National Hockey League during the 1988–89 NHL season. It lists what team each player has been traded to, signed by, or claimed by, and for which player(s) or draft pick(s), if applicable.

== Trades between teams ==
=== May ===
May 20, 1988	To Minnesota North Stars rights to Igor Liba	To Calgary Flames 5th-rd pick - 1988 entry draft (# 85 - Tomas Forslund)

=== June ===
June 10, 1988	To Toronto Maple Leafs Darren Veitch	To Detroit Red Wings Miroslav Frycer
June 13, 1988	To Detroit Red Wings Paul MacLean	To Winnipeg Jets Brent Ashton
June 13, 1988	To Minnesota North Stars Mark Hardy	To New York Rangers future considerations (3rd-rd pick - 1989 entry draft - # 49 - Louie DeBrusk)^{1}
June 21, 1988	To Toronto Maple Leafs Bill Root	To Philadelphia Flyers Mike Stothers

1. Trade completed on June 17, 1989

=== July ===
July 5, 1988	To Quebec Nordiques Bob Mason	To Chicago Blackhawks Mike Eagles
July 6, 1988	To Hartford Whalers Grant Jennings; Ed Kastelic	To Washington Capitals Mike Millar; Neil Sheehy
July 19, 1988	To New Jersey Devils Steve Rooney; 3rd-rd pick - 1990 entry draft (# 56 - Brad Bombardir)	To Winnipeg Jets Alain Chevrier; 7th-rd pick - 1989 entry draft (# 131 - Doug Evans)
July 22, 1988	To Edmonton Oilers Greg Adams	To Washington Capitals rights to Geoff Courtnall
July 25, 1988	To Quebec Nordiques Greg Smyth; 3rd-rd pick - 1989 entry draft (# 54 - John Tanner)	To Philadelphia Flyers Terry Carkner
July 29, 1988	To Quebec Nordiques Joel Baillargeon	To Winnipeg Jets future considerations

=== August ===
August 1, 1988	To Quebec Nordiques Bruce Bell; Jari Gronstrand; Walt Poddubny; 4th-rd pick - 1989 entry draft (# 76 - Eric Dubois)	To New York Rangers Jason Lafreniere; Normand Rochefort
August 9, 1988	To Los Angeles Kings Wayne Gretzky; Mike Krushelnyski; Marty McSorley	To Edmonton Oilers Jimmy Carson; Martin Gelinas; 1st-rd pick - 1989 entry draft (NJ - # 18 - Jason Miller)^{1} 1st-rd pick - 1991 entry draft (# 20 - Martin Rucinsky); 1st-rd pick - 1993 entry draft (# 16 - Nick Stajduhar) cash
August 9, 1988	To Montreal Canadiens Jocelyn Lemieux; Darrell May; 3rd-rd pick - 1990 entry draft (# 30 - Patrice Brisebois)	To St. Louis Blues Sergio Momesso; Vincent Riendeau
August 10, 1988	To Los Angeles Kings John Miner	To Edmonton Oilers Craig Redmond

1. Edmonton's first-round pick went to New Jersey as the result of a trade on June 17, 1989, that sent Corey Foster to Edmonton in exchange for this pick.

=== September ===
September 1, 1988	To Pittsburgh Penguins Wendell Young; 7th-rd pick - 1990 entry draft (# 130 - Mika Valila)	To Philadelphia Flyers 3rd-rd pick - 1990 entry draft (# 47 - Chris Therien)
September 6, 1988	To Vancouver Canucks Robert Nordmark; 2nd-rd pick - 1991 entry draft (MTL - # 43 - Craig Darby)^{1}	To St. Louis Blues Dave Richter
September 6, 1988	To Calgary Flames Steve Bozek; Mike Dark; Doug Gilmour; Mark Hunter	To St. Louis Blues Mike Bullard; Tim Corkery; Craig Coxe
September 6, 1988	To Vancouver Canucks Steve Bozek; Paul Reinhart	To Calgary Flames 3rd-rd pick - 1989 entry draft (# 50 - Veli-Pekka Kautonen)
September 28, 1988	To Philadelphia Flyers Chris Jensen	To New York Rangers Michael Boyce
September 29, 1988	To Los Angeles Kings Doug Crossman	To Philadelphia Flyers Jay Wells
September 30, 1987	To St. Louis Blues Peter Douris	To Winnipeg Jets Kent Carlson; 12th-rd pick - 1989 entry draft (# 240 - Sergei Kharin); 4th-rd pick - 1990 entry draft (# 75 - Scott Levins)
September 30, 1987	To Vancouver Canucks Ernie Vargas	To St. Louis Blues Dave Lowry

1. Vancouver's second-round pick went to Montreal as the result of a trade on March 6, 1990, that sent Jyrki Lumme to Vancouver in exchange for this pick.

=== October ===
October 3, 1988	To Buffalo Sabres Wayne Van Dorp	To Pittsburgh Penguins 7th-rd pick - 1990 entry draft (# 145 - Patrick Neaton)
October 6, 1988	To Hartford Whalers Mark LaVarre	To Chicago Blackhawks future considerations
October 11, 1988	To Minnesota North Stars Paul Jerrard; Mike Sullivan; Mark Tinordi rights to Bret Barnett; 3rd-rd pick - 1989 entry draft (# 60 - Murray Garbutt)	To New York Rangers Brian Lawton; Igor Liba rights to Rick Bennett
October 12, 1988	To Washington Capitals Kent Carlson	To Winnipeg Jets future considerations
October 19, 1988	To St. Louis Blues 6th-rd pick - 1989 entry draft (# 124 - Derek Frenette)^{1}	To Washington Capitals Rob Whistle
October 21, 1988	To Buffalo Sabres Larry Playfair	To Los Angeles Kings Bob Logan; 9th-rd pick - 1989 entry draft (# 182 - Jim Giacin)
October 27, 1988	To Edmonton Oilers Jeff Crossman	To New York Rangers Ron Shudra

1. The trade was for a conditional pick in 1989 entry draft. The condition – St. Louis receives a 5th-rd pick if Whistle played in 20 games or more in the 1988-89 or a 6th-rd pick if played in less than 20 goals - was not converted as he did not play in the NHL that season.

=== November ===
November 1, 1988	To Minnesota North Stars rights to Rob Gaudreau	To Pittsburgh Penguins Richard Zemlak
November 1, 1988	To Minnesota North Stars rights to Claudio Scremin	To Washington Capitals Don Beaupre
November 3, 1988	To Boston Bruins Paul Guay	To Los Angeles Kings rights to Dave Pasin
November 7, 1988	To Toronto Maple Leafs John Kordic; 6th-rd pick - 1989 entry draft (# 125 - Mike Doers)	To Montreal Canadiens Russ Courtnall
November 7, 1988	To Montreal Canadiens Jean-Jacques Daigneault	To Philadelphia Flyers Scott Sandelin
November 12, 1988	To Buffalo Sabres Doug Bodger; Darrin Shannon	To Pittsburgh Penguins Tom Barrasso; 3rd-rd pick - 1990 entry draft (# 61 - Joe Dziedzic)
November 25, 1988	To Los Angeles Kings Gilles Hamel	To Winnipeg Jets Paul Fenton
November 25, 1988	To Chicago Blackhawks Bob Bassen; Steve Konroyd	To New York Islanders Marc Bergevin; Gary Nylund
November 28, 1988	To St. Louis Blues Peter Zezel	To Philadelphia Flyers Mike Bullard

=== December ===
December 6, 1988	To Quebec Nordiques Mario Marois	To Winnipeg Jets Gord Donnelly
December 8, 1988	To Minnesota North Stars 5th-rd pick - 1989 entry draft (# 87 - Pat MacLeod)	To Philadelphia Flyers Moe Mantha Jr.
December 9, 1988	To Minnesota North Stars Larry Bernard; 5th-rd pick - 1989 entry draft (# 97 - Rhys Hollyman)	To New York Rangers Mark Hardy
December 9, 1988	To New Jersey Devils Jean-Marc Lanthier	To Boston Bruins Dan Dorion
December 10, 1988	To Winnipeg Jets future considerations	To Philadelphia Flyers Steven Fletcher
December 12, 1988	To Los Angeles Kings Michael Boyce; Todd Elik; Igor Liba future considerations	To New York Rangers Dean Kennedy; Denis Larocque
December 12, 1988	To New Jersey Devils Tommy Albelin	To Quebec Nordiques 4th-rd pick - 1989 entry draft (# 68 - Niklas Andersson)
December 13, 1988	To New Jersey Devils Lyle Phair	To Los Angeles Kings cash
December 15, 1988	To Minnesota North Stars future considerations	To Quebec Nordiques Stephane Roy
December 17, 1988	To Minnesota North Stars Steve Gotaas; Ville Siren	To Pittsburgh Penguins Scott Bjugstad; Gord Dineen
December 26, 1988	To Hartford Whalers Brian Lawton; Norm Maciver; Don Maloney	To New York Rangers Carey Wilson; 5th-rd pick - 1990 entry draft # 99 - Lubos Rob)
December 26, 1988	To Buffalo Sabres Rick Vaive	To Chicago Blackhawks Adam Creighton
December 30, 1988	To Boston Bruins Ray Neufeld	To Winnipeg Jets Moe Lemay

=== January ===
January 3, 1989	To Edmonton Oilers Miroslav Frycer	To Detroit Red Wings 10th-rd pick - 1989 entry draft (# 204 - Rick Judson)
January 9, 1989	To Calgary Flames Steve Guenette	To Pittsburgh Penguins 6th-rd pick - 1989 entry draft (# 126 - Mike Needham)
January 16, 1989	To Montreal Canadiens 1st-rd pick - 1990 entry draft (# 12 - Turner Stevenson); 3rd-rd pick - 1991 entry draft (STL - # 65 - Nathan LaFayette)^{1}	To St. Louis Blues Mike Lalor; 1st-rd pick - 1990 entry draft (VAN - # 18 - Shawn Antoski)^{2}
January 19, 1989	To Chicago Blackhawks Alain Chevrier	To Winnipeg Jets 4th-rd pick - 1989 entry draft (# 69 - Allain Roy)
January 22, 1989	To Boston Bruins future considerations (Steve Kasper)^{3}	To Los Angeles Kings Jay Miller future considerations (Bobby Carpenter)^{3}
January 23, 1989	To Edmonton Oilers Doug Halward	To Detroit Red Wings 12th-rd pick - 1989 entry draft (# 246 - Jason Glickman)
January 24, 1989	To Montreal Canadiens Dan Woodley	To Vancouver Canucks Jose Charbonneau

1. St. Louis' third-round pick was re-acquired as the result of a trade on December 12, 1989 that sent Todd Ewen to Montreal in exchange for future considerations (this pick).
2. St. Louis' first-round pick went to Vancouver as the result of a trade on March 6, 1990 that sent Harold Snepsts, Rich Sutter and Vancouver's second-round pick in the 1990 entry draft to St. Louis in exchange for Adrien Plavsic, St. Louis' second-round pick in the 1991 entry draft and this pick.
3. Trade completed on January 23, 1989.

=== February ===
February 3, 1989	To Los Angeles Kings Dean Kennedy	To New York Rangers 4th-rd pick - 1990 entry draft (MIN - # 70 - Cal McGowan)^{1}
February 3, 1989	To Boston Bruins Scott Harlow	To St. Louis Blues Phil DeGaetano
February 7, 1989	To Edmonton Oilers Dave Brown	To Philadelphia Flyers Keith Acton; 6th-rd pick - 1991 entry draft (# 122 - Dmitri Yushkevich)
February 7, 1989	To Toronto Maple Leafs 5th-rd pick - 1989 entry draft (# 96 - Keith Carney)	To Philadelphia Flyers Al Secord
February 9, 1989	To Vancouver Canucks Jamie Husgen	To Winnipeg Jets future considerations
February 13, 1989	To Boston Bruins Ron Flockhart	To St. Louis Blues future considerations
February 15, 1989	To Edmonton Oilers Tomas Jonsson	To New York Islanders future considerations (5th-rd pick - 1989 entry draft - # 99 - Kevin O'Sullivan)^{2}
February 16, 1989	To Buffalo Sabres 7th-rd pick - 1990 entry draft (# 142 - Viktor Gordiuk)	To Chicago Blackhawks Wayne Van Dorp
February 21, 1989	To Toronto Maple Leafs Ken Hammond	To New York Rangers Chris McRae
February 22, 1989	To Los Angeles Kings Kelly Hrudey	To New York Islanders Mark Fitzpatrick; Wayne McBean future considerations (Doug Crossman)^{3}
February 25, 1989	To Toronto Maple Leafs Paul Lawless	To Vancouver Canucks rights to Peter DeBoer

1. The Rangers' fourth-round pick then went to Minnesota as the result of a trade on March 6, 1990 that sent Mike Gartner to the Rangers in exchange for Ulf Dahlen, the Rangers' fourth-round pick in the 1991 entry draft and this pick.
2. Trade completed on June 17, 1989.
3. Trade completed on May 23, 1989.

=== March ===
- Trading Deadline: March 7, 1989

March 4, 1989	To Minnesota North Stars Perry Berezan; Shane Churla	To Calgary Flames Brian MacLellan; 4th-rd pick - 1989 entry draft (# 70 - Robert Reichel)
March 6, 1989	To Hartford Whalers Jim Thomson	To Washington Capitals Scot Kleinendorst
March 6, 1989	To Buffalo Sabres Grant Ledyard; Clint Malarchuk; 6th-rd pick - 1991 entry draft (# 124 - Brian Holzinger)	To Washington Capitals Calle Johansson; 2nd-rd pick - 1989 entry draft (# 35 - Byron Dafoe)
March 6, 1989	To Los Angeles Kings Pat Mayer	To Pittsburgh Penguins Tim Tookey
March 6, 1989	To Toronto Maple Leafs 1st-rd pick - 1989 entry draft (# 12 - Rob Pearson); 1st-rd pick - 1989 entry draft (# 21 - Steve Bancroft )	To Philadelphia Flyers Ken Wregget
March 7, 1989	To Hartford Whalers Jim Pavese	To Detroit Red Wings Torrie Robertson
March 7, 1989	To Buffalo Sabres 5th-rd pick - 1990 entry draft (# 97 - Richard Smehlik)	To New York Rangers Lindy Ruff
March 7, 1989	To Vancouver Canucks Greg Adams; Doug Smith	To Edmonton Oilers John LeBlanc; 5th-rd pick - 1989 entry draft (# 92 - Peter White)
March 7, 1989	To Los Angeles Kings Alan May; Jim Wiemer	To Edmonton Oilers John English; Brian Wilks
March 7, 1989	To Minnesota North Stars Mike Gartner; Larry Murphy	To Washington Capitals Dino Ciccarelli; Bob Rouse
March 7, 1989	To Minnesota North Stars Reed Larson	To New York Islanders future considerations (Mike Kelfer)^{1}
March 7, 1989	To Chicago Blackhawks Greg Gilbert	To New York Islanders 5th-rd pick - 1989 entry draft (# 90 - Steve Young)
March 7, 1989	To New Jersey Devils Claude Vilgrain	To Vancouver Canucks Tim Lenardon

1. Trade completed on May 12, 1989.

== Additional sources ==
- hockeydb.com - search for player and select "show trades"
- "NHL trades for 1988-1989". NHL Trade Tracker.
