= 1987 Canada Cup rosters =

Below are the national team rosters for three of the six teams that competed at the 1987 Canada Cup ice hockey tournament.

== Canada ==
Head coach: Mike Keenan

Assistant coach: John Muckler, Jean Perron, Tom Watt

No.	Pos.	Name	Height	Weight	Birthdate	1987-88 Team
31	G	Grant Fuhr	5 ft 11 in (180 cm)	183 lb (83 kg)	September 28, 1962 (aged 24)	(Canada) Edmonton Oilers
27	G	Ron Hextall	6 ft 3 in (191 cm)	201 lb (91 kg)	May 3, 1964 (aged 23)	(United States) Philadelphia Flyers
30	G	Kelly Hrudey	5 ft 11 in (180 cm)	190 lb (86 kg)	January 13, 1961 (aged 26)	(United States) New York Islanders
7	D	Ray Bourque	5 ft 11 in (180 cm)	216 lb (98 kg)	December 28, 1960 (aged 26)	(United States) Boston Bruins
77	D	Paul Coffey	6 ft 0 in (183 cm)	201 lb (91 kg)	June 1, 1961 (aged 26)	(United States) Pittsburgh Penguins
2	D	Doug Crossman	6 ft 2 in (188 cm)	190 lb (86 kg)	June 13, 1960 (aged 27)	(United States) Philadelphia Flyers
4	D	Craig Hartsburg	6 ft 1 in (185 cm)	203 lb (92 kg)	June 29, 1959 (aged 28)	(United States) Minnesota North Stars
8	D	Larry Murphy	6 ft 2 in (188 cm)	209 lb (95 kg)	March 8, 1961 (aged 26)	(United States) Washington Capitals
3	D	James Patrick	6 ft 2 in (188 cm)	201 lb (91 kg)	June 14, 1963 (aged 24)	(United States) New York Rangers
5	D	Normand Rochefort	6 ft 2 in (188 cm)	220 lb (100 kg)	January 28, 1961 (aged 26)	(Canada) Quebec Nordiques
9	F	Glenn Anderson	6 ft 1 in (185 cm)	190 lb (86 kg)	October 2, 1960 (aged 26)	(Canada) Edmonton Oilers
14	F	Kevin Dineen	5 ft 11 in (180 cm)	190 lb (86 kg)	October 28, 1963 (aged 23)	(United States) Hartford Whalers
12	F	Mike Gartner	6 ft 1 in (185 cm)	190 lb (86 kg)	October 29, 1959 (aged 27)	(United States) Washington Capitals
28	F	Doug Gilmour	5 ft 10 in (178 cm)	176 lb (80 kg)	June 25, 1963 (aged 24)	(United States) St. Louis Blues
16	F	Michel Goulet	6 ft 1 in (185 cm)	185 lb (84 kg)	April 21, 1960 (aged 27)	(Canada) Quebec Nordiques
99	F	Wayne Gretzky (C)	6 ft 0 in (183 cm)	185 lb (84 kg)	January 26, 1961 (aged 26)	(Canada) Edmonton Oilers
10	F	Dale Hawerchuk	5 ft 11 in (180 cm)	185 lb (84 kg)	April 4, 1963 (aged 24)	(Canada) Winnipeg Jets
32	F	Claude Lemieux	6 ft 1 in (185 cm)	216 lb (98 kg)	July 16, 1965 (aged 22)	(Canada) Montreal Canadiens
66	F	Mario Lemieux	6 ft 4 in (193 cm)	231 lb (105 kg)	October 5, 1965 (aged 21)	(United States) Pittsburgh Penguins
11	F	Mark Messier	6 ft 1 in (185 cm)	205 lb (93 kg)	January 18, 1961 (aged 26)	(Canada) Edmonton Oilers
26	F	Brian Propp	5 ft 9 in (175 cm)	190 lb (86 kg)	February 15, 1959 (aged 28)	(United States) Philadelphia Flyers
21	F	Brent Sutter	6 ft 0 in (183 cm)	187 lb (85 kg)	June 10, 1962 (aged 25)	(United States) New York Islanders
22	F	Rick Tocchet	6 ft 0 in (183 cm)	214 lb (97 kg)	April 9, 1964 (aged 23)	(United States) Philadelphia Flyers

== Czechoslovakia ==
Head coach: Ján Starší

No.	Pos.	Name	Height	Weight	Birthdate	1987-88 Team
1	G	Petr Bříza	6 ft 0 in (183 cm)	181 lb (82 kg)	December 9, 1964 (aged 22)	(Czechoslovakia) TJ Motor Česke Budějovice
2	G	Dominik Hašek	6 ft 0 in (183 cm)	165 lb (75 kg)	January 29, 1965 (aged 22)	(Czechoslovakia) TJ Pardubice
29	G	Jaromír Šindel	6 ft 1 in (185 cm)	190 lb (86 kg)	November 30, 1959 (aged 27)	(Czechoslovakia) TJ Sparta Praha
9	D	Jaroslav Benák	6 ft 0 in (183 cm)	187 lb (85 kg)	April 3, 1962 (aged 25)	(Czechoslovakia) ASD Dukla Jihlava
28	D	Mojmír Božík	5 ft 9 in (175 cm)	185 lb (84 kg)	February 26, 1962 (aged 25)	(Czechoslovakia) HC Košice
6	D	Luděk Čajka	6 ft 3 in (191 cm)	196 lb (89 kg)	November 3, 1963 (aged 23)	(Czechoslovakia) TJ Gottwaldov
4	D	Miloslav Hořava	5 ft 11 in (180 cm)	192 lb (87 kg)	August 14, 1961 (aged 26)	(Czechoslovakia) TJ Kladno
5	D	Drahomír Kadlec	5 ft 11 in (180 cm)	190 lb (86 kg)	November 29, 1965 (aged 21)	(Czechoslovakia) ASD Dukla Jihlava
7	D	Bedřich Ščerban	5 ft 8 in (173 cm)	176 lb (80 kg)	May 31, 1964 (aged 23)	(Czechoslovakia) ASD Dukla Jihlava
16	D	Antonín Stavjaňa	6 ft 0 in (183 cm)	198 lb (90 kg)	February 10, 1963 (aged 24)	(Czechoslovakia) TJ Gottwaldov
15	F	Jiří Doležal	5 ft 9 in (175 cm)	185 lb (84 kg)	September 22, 1963 (aged 23)	(Czechoslovakia) TJ Sparta Praha
24	F	Jiří Hrdina	6 ft 0 in (183 cm)	194 lb (88 kg)	January 5, 1958 (aged 29)	(Czechoslovakia) TJ Sparta Praha
12	F	Ján Jaško	6 ft 2 in (188 cm)	201 lb (91 kg)	June 20, 1959 (aged 28)	(Czechoslovakia) HC Slovan Bratislava
14	F	Jiři Kučera	6 ft 0 in (183 cm)	181 lb (82 kg)	March 28, 1966 (aged 21)	(Czechoslovakia) TJ Plzeň
11	F	Igor Liba	6 ft 0 in (183 cm)	198 lb (90 kg)	November 4, 1960 (aged 26)	(Czechoslovakia) HC Košice
18	F	Ladislav Lubina	6 ft 1 in (185 cm)	201 lb (91 kg)	February 11, 1967 (aged 20)	(Czechoslovakia) ASD Dukla Jihlava
21	F	Dušan Pašek (C)	6 ft 1 in (185 cm)	201 lb (91 kg)	July 9, 1960 (aged 27)	(Czechoslovakia) HC Slovan Bratislava
10	F	Petr Rosol	5 ft 10 in (178 cm)	170 lb (77 kg)	June 20, 1964 (aged 22)	(Czechoslovakia) TJ Litvínov
17	F	Vladimír Růžička	6 ft 3 in (191 cm)	216 lb (98 kg)	January 6, 1963 (aged 24)	(Czechoslovakia) HK Dukla Trenčin
22	F	Jiří Šejba	5 ft 10 in (178 cm)	185 lb (84 kg)	July 22, 1962 (aged 25)	(Czechoslovakia) TJ Pardubice
27	F	Rostislav Vlach	6 ft 0 in (183 cm)	203 lb (92 kg)	July 3, 1962 (aged 25)	(Czechoslovakia) TJ Gottwaldov
20	F	Petr Vlk	6 ft 2 in (188 cm)	194 lb (88 kg)	January 7, 1964 (aged 23)	(Czechoslovakia) ASD Dukla Jihlava
19	F	David Volek	6 ft 0 in (183 cm)	185 lb (84 kg)	June 18, 1966 (aged 21)	(Czechoslovakia) TJ Sparta Praha

== Finland ==
Head coach: Rauno Korpi

Assistant coach: Juhani Tamminen

No.	Pos.	Name	Height	Weight	Birthdate	1987-88 Team
19	G	Jarmo Myllys	5 ft 9 in (175 cm)	172 lb (78 kg)	December 29, 1965 (aged 21)	(Finland) Lukko
1	G	Kari Takko	6 ft 2 in (188 cm)	192 lb (87 kg)	June 23, 1962 (aged 25)	(United States) Minnesota North Stars
30	G	Jukka Tammi	5 ft 11 in (180 cm)	172 lb (78 kg)	April 10, 1962 (aged 25)	(Finland) Ilves
3	D	Timo Blomqvist	5 ft 11 in (180 cm)	201 lb (91 kg)	January 23, 1961 (aged 26)	(Sweden) MoDo Hockey
6	D	Jari Grönstrand	6 ft 3 in (191 cm)	203 lb (92 kg)	November 14, 1962 (aged 24)	(United States) New York Rangers
7	D	Timo Jutila	5 ft 10 in (178 cm)	187 lb (85 kg)	December 24, 1963 (aged 23)	(Finland) Tappara
4	D	Jouko Narvanmaa	6 ft 1 in (185 cm)	201 lb (91 kg)	September 10, 1962 (aged 25)	(Sweden) MoDo Hockey
2	D	Teppo Numminen	6 ft 1 in (185 cm)	198 lb (90 kg)	July 3, 1968 (aged 19)	(Finland) Tappara
29	D	Reijo Ruotsalainen	5 ft 8 in (173 cm)	165 lb (75 kg)	April 1, 1960 (aged 27)	(Sweden) HV71
8	D	Ville Sirén	6 ft 2 in (188 cm)	196 lb (89 kg)	February 11, 1964 (aged 23)	(United States) Pittsburgh Penguins
23	D	Hannu Virta	5 ft 11 in (180 cm)	181 lb (82 kg)	March 22, 1963 (aged 24)	(Finland) TPS
20	F	Matti Hagman	6 ft 0 in (183 cm)	183 lb (83 kg)	September 21, 1965 (aged 21)	(Finland) HIFK
18	F	Raimo Helminen	6 ft 0 in (183 cm)	194 lb (88 kg)	March 11, 1964 (aged 23)	(Finland) Ilves
15	F	Iiro Järvi	6 ft 2 in (188 cm)	201 lb (91 kg)	March 23, 1965 (aged 22)	(Finland) HIFK
17	F	Jari Kurri (C)	6 ft 0 in (183 cm)	198 lb (90 kg)	May 18, 1960 (aged 27)	(Canada) Edmonton Oilers
12	F	Markku Kyllönen	6 ft 3 in (191 cm)	198 lb (90 kg)	February 15, 1962 (aged 25)	(Finland) Kärpät
24	F	Mikko Mäkelä	6 ft 2 in (188 cm)	194 lb (88 kg)	February 26, 1965 (aged 22)	(United States) New York Islanders
22	F	Janne Ojanen	6 ft 2 in (188 cm)	203 lb (92 kg)	April 9, 1968 (aged 19)	(Finland) Tappara
21	F	Christian Ruuttu	6 ft 0 in (183 cm)	201 lb (91 kg)	February 24, 1964 (aged 23)	(United States) Buffalo Sabres
14	F	Jukka Seppo	6 ft 2 in (188 cm)	207 lb (94 kg)	January 22, 1968 (aged 19)	(Finland) Sport
26	F	Petri Skriko	5 ft 10 in (178 cm)	172 lb (78 kg)	March 13, 1962 (aged 25)	(Canada) Vancouver Canucks
25	F	Raimo Summanen	5 ft 11 in (180 cm)	196 lb (89 kg)	March 2, 1962 (aged 25)	(Canada) Vancouver Canucks (Note: Played 20 games for the Fredericton Express and 7 games for the Flint Spirits, Vancouver's respective AHL and IHL affiliates)
10	F	Esa Tikkanen	6 ft 1 in (185 cm)	209 lb (95 kg)	January 25, 1965 (aged 22)	(Canada) Edmonton Oilers

== Sweden ==
Head coach: Tommy Sandlin

Assistant coach: Curt Lindström

No.	Pos.	Name	Height	Weight	Birthdate	1987-88 Team
30	G	Anders Bergman	5 ft 10 in (178 cm)	165 lb (75 kg)	August 6, 1963 (aged 24)	(Sweden) MoDo Hockey
31	G	Åke Lilljebjörn	6 ft 1 in (185 cm)	194 lb (88 kg)	September 23, 1962 (aged 24)	(Sweden) AIK
1	G	Peter Lindmark	5 ft 11 in (180 cm)	179 lb (81 kg)	November 8, 1966 (aged 20)	(Sweden) Färjestad BK
3	D	Tommy Albelin	6 ft 1 in (185 cm)	194 lb (88 kg)	May 21, 1964 (aged 23)	(Canada) Quebec Nordiques
19	D	Peter Andersson	6 ft 0 in (183 cm)	181 lb (82 kg)	March 2, 1962 (aged 25)	(Sweden) IF Björklöven
2	D	Anders Eldebrink	6 ft 0 in (183 cm)	190 lb (86 kg)	December 11, 1960 (aged 26)	(Sweden) Södertälje SK
8	D	Tomas Jonsson	5 ft 11 in (180 cm)	183 lb (83 kg)	April 12, 1960 (aged 27)	(United States) New York Islanders
6	D	Lars Karlsson	5 ft 10 in (178 cm)	176 lb (80 kg)	June 28, 1960 (aged 27)	(Sweden) IF Björklöven
7	D	Tommy Samuelsson	5 ft 10 in (178 cm)	165 lb (75 kg)	January 12, 1960 (aged 27)	(Sweden) Färjestad BK
27	D	Michael Thelvén	6 ft 0 in (183 cm)	179 lb (81 kg)	January 7, 1961 (aged 26)	(United States) Boston Bruins
12	F	Mikael Andersson	6 ft 2 in (188 cm)	194 lb (88 kg)	July 6, 1959 (aged 28)	(Sweden) IF Björklöven
18	F	Jonas Bergqvist	6 ft 0 in (183 cm)	203 lb (92 kg)	September 26, 1962 (aged 24)	(Sweden) Leksands IF
20	F	Anders Carlsson	5 ft 11 in (180 cm)	194 lb (88 kg)	November 25, 1960 (aged 26)	(United States) Utica Devils (Note: Played 9 games for the New Jersey Devils, Utica's NHL affiliate)
4	F	Thom Eklund	6 ft 0 in (183 cm)	185 lb (84 kg)	October 28, 1958 (aged 25)	(Sweden) Södertälje SK
23	F	Peter Eriksson	6 ft 5 in (196 cm)	225 lb (102 kg)	July 12, 1965 (aged 22)	(Sweden) HV71
16	F	Bengt-Åke Gustafsson	6 ft 0 in (183 cm)	198 lb (90 kg)	March 23, 1958 (aged 29)	(United States) Washington Capitals
15	F	Kent Nilsson	6 ft 0 in (183 cm)	187 lb (85 kg)	August 31, 1956 (aged 31)	(Italy) HC Bolzano (Note: Played two games with HC Lugano)
26	F	Mats Näslund	5 ft 7 in (170 cm)	161 lb (73 kg)	October 31, 1959 (aged 27)	(Canada) Montreal Canadiens
21	F	Lars-Gunnar Pettersson	6 ft 0 in (183 cm)	185 lb (84 kg)	April 8, 1960 (aged 27)	(Sweden) Luleå HF
24	F	Magnus Roupé	6 ft 0 in (183 cm)	212 lb (96 kg)	March 23, 1963 (aged 24)	(United States) Philadelphia Flyers (Note: Played 23 games with the Hershey Bears, Philadelphia's AHL affiliate)
9	F	Thomas Rundqvist	6 ft 3 in (191 cm)	196 lb (89 kg)	May 4, 1960 (aged 27)	(Sweden) Färjestad BK
17	F	Peter Sundström	6 ft 0 in (183 cm)	181 lb (82 kg)	December 14, 1961 (aged 25)	(United States) Washington Capitals
22	F	Håkan Södergren	5 ft 9 in (175 cm)	176 lb (80 kg)	June 14, 1959 (aged 28)	(Sweden) Djurgårdens IF

== United States ==
Head coach: Bob Johnson

Assistant coach: Ted Sator

No.	Pos.	Name	Height	Weight	Birthdate	1987-88 Team
1	G	Tom Barasso	6 ft 3 in (191 cm)	209 lb (95 kg)	March 31, 1965 (aged 22)	(United States) Buffalo Sabres
31	G	Bob Mason	6 ft 1 in (185 cm)	181 lb (82 kg)	April 22, 1961 (aged 26)	(United States) Chicago Blackhawks
34	G	John Vanbiesbrouck	5 ft 8 in (173 cm)	176 lb (80 kg)	September 4, 1963 (aged 24)	(United States) New York Rangers
24	D	Chris Chelios	6 ft 0 in (183 cm)	192 lb (87 kg)	January 25, 1962 (aged 25)	(Canada) Montreal Canadiens
2	D	Dave Ellett	6 ft 2 in (188 cm)	205 lb (93 kg)	March 30, 1964 (aged 23)	(Canada) Winnipeg Jets
4	D	Kevin Hatcher	6 ft 3 in (191 cm)	231 lb (105 kg)	September 9, 1966 (aged 21)	(United States) Washington Capitals
6	D	Phil Housley	5 ft 10 in (178 cm)	179 lb (81 kg)	March 9, 1964 (aged 23)	(United States) Buffalo Sabres
5	D	Rod Langway (C)	6 ft 3 in (191 cm)	218 lb (99 kg)	May 3, 1957 (aged 30)	(United States) Washington Capitals
3	D	Mike Ramsey	6 ft 3 in (191 cm)	212 lb (96 kg)	December 3, 1960 (aged 26)	(United States) Buffalo Sabres
20	D	Gary Suter	6 ft 0 in (183 cm)	205 lb (93 kg)	June 24, 1964 (aged 23)	(Canada) Calgary Flames
13	F	Bob Brooke	5 ft 11 in (180 cm)	194 lb (88 kg)	December 18, 1960 (aged 26)	(United States) Minnesota North Stars
10	F	Aaron Broten	5 ft 10 in (178 cm)	174 lb (79 kg)	November 14, 1960 (aged 26)	(United States) New Jersey Devils
21	F	Bobby Carpenter	6 ft 0 in (183 cm)	201 lb (91 kg)	July 13, 1963 (aged 24)	(United States) Los Angeles Kings
8	F	Curt Fraser	6 ft 0 in (183 cm)	201 lb (91 kg)	January 12, 1958 (aged 29)	(United States) Chicago Blackhawks (Note: Traded to the Minnesota North Stars on January 2, 1988)
12	F	Mark Johnson	5 ft 9 in (175 cm)	161 lb (73 kg)	September 22, 1957 (aged 29)	(United States) New Jersey Devils
16	F	Pat LaFontaine	5 ft 10 in (178 cm)	181 lb (82 kg)	February 22, 1965 (aged 22)	(United States) New York Islanders
9	F	Corey Millen	5 ft 6 in (168 cm)	190 lb (86 kg)	March 30, 1964 (aged 23)	(Switzerland) HC Ambrì-Piotta
11	F	Kelly Miller	5 ft 11 in (180 cm)	198 lb (90 kg)	March 3, 1963 (aged 24)	(United States) Washington Capitals
7	F	Joe Mullen	5 ft 10 in (178 cm)	183 lb (83 kg)	February 26, 1957 (aged 30)	(Canada) Calgary Flames
30	F	Chris Nilan	6 ft 0 in (183 cm)	205 lb (93 kg)	February 9, 1958 (aged 29)	(Canada) Montreal Canadiens (Note: Traded to the New York Rangers on January 27, 1988)
11	F	Eddie Olczyk	6 ft 1 in (185 cm)	201 lb (91 kg)	August 16, 1966 (aged 21)	(Canada) Toronto Maple Leafs
29	F	Joel Otto	6 ft 4 in (193 cm)	220 lb (100 kg)	October 29, 1961 (aged 25)	(Canada) Calgary Flames
14	F	Wayne Presley	5 ft 11 in (180 cm)	181 lb (82 kg)	March 23, 1965 (aged 22)	(United States) Chicago Blackhawks

== USSR ==
Head coach: Viktor Tikhonov

Assistant coaches: Igor Dmitriyev, Vladimir Yurzinov

No.	Pos.	Name	Height	Weight	Birthdate	1987-88 Team
20	G	Yevgeni Belosheikin	5 ft 10 in (178 cm)	179 lb (81 kg)	April 17, 1966 (aged 21)	(Soviet Union) CSKA Moskva
1	G	Sergei Mylnikov	5 ft 10 in (178 cm)	172 lb (78 kg)	October 6, 1958 (aged 28)	(Soviet Union) Traktor Chelyabinsk
30	G	Vitālijs Samoilovs	5 ft 11 in (180 cm)	174 lb (79 kg)	April 19, 1962 (aged 25)	(Soviet Union) Dinamo Riga
14	D	Anatoli Fedotov	6 ft 0 in (183 cm)	179 lb (81 kg)	May 11, 1966 (aged 21)	(Soviet Union) Dynamo Moskva
2	D	Viacheslav Fetisov (C)	6 ft 0 in (183 cm)	218 lb (99 kg)	April 20, 1958 (aged 29)	(Soviet Union) CSKA Moskva
3	D	Alexei Gusarov	6 ft 1 in (185 cm)	198 lb (90 kg)	July 8, 1964 (aged 23)	(Soviet Union) CSKA Moskva
7	D	Alexei Kasatonov	6 ft 1 in (185 cm)	196 lb (89 kg)	October 14, 1959 (aged 27)	(Soviet Union) CSKA Moskva
29	D	Igor Kravchuk	6 ft 1 in (185 cm)	205 lb (93 kg)	September 13, 1966 (aged 21)	(Soviet Union) CSKA Moskva
5	D	Vasili Pervukhin	5 ft 11 in (180 cm)	203 lb (92 kg)	January 1, 1955 (aged 32)	(Soviet Union) Dynamo Moskva
4	D	Igor Stelnov	6 ft 0 in (183 cm)	209 lb (95 kg)	February 12, 1963 (aged 24)	(Soviet Union) CSKA Moskva
27	F	Vyacheslav Bykov	5 ft 8 in (173 cm)	203 lb (92 kg)	July 24, 1960 (aged 27)	(Soviet Union) CSKA Moskva
13	F	Valeri Kamensky	6 ft 1 in (185 cm)	196 lb (89 kg)	April 18, 1966 (aged 21)	(Soviet Union) CSKA Moskva
8	F	Yuri Khmylyov	6 ft 1 in (185 cm)	190 lb (86 kg)	August 9, 1964 (aged 23)	(Soviet Union) Krylya Sovetov Moskva
15	F	Andrei Khomutov	5 ft 10 in (178 cm)	181 lb (82 kg)	April 21, 1961 (aged 26)	(Soviet Union) CSKA Moskva
9	F	Vladimir Krutov	5 ft 9 in (175 cm)	194 lb (88 kg)	June 1, 1960 (aged 27)	(Soviet Union) CSKA Moskva
11	F	Igor Larionov	5 ft 9 in (175 cm)	172 lb (78 kg)	December 3, 1960 (aged 26)	(Soviet Union) CSKA Moskva
23	F	Andrei Lomakin	5 ft 9 in (175 cm)	174 lb (79 kg)	April 4, 1964 (aged 23)	(Soviet Union) Dynamo Moskva
24	F	Sergei Makarov	5 ft 11 in (180 cm)	183 lb (83 kg)	June 19, 1958 (aged 29)	(Soviet Union) CSKA Moskva
12	F	Sergei Nemchinov	5 ft 11 in (180 cm)	198 lb (90 kg)	January 14, 1964 (aged 23)	(Soviet Union) Krylya Sovetov Moskva
22	F	Sergei Pryakhin	6 ft 4 in (193 cm)	209 lb (95 kg)	December 7, 1963 (aged 23)	(Soviet Union) Krylya Sovetov Moskva
18	F	Alexander Semak	5 ft 9 in (175 cm)	183 lb (83 kg)	February 11, 1966 (aged 21)	(Soviet Union) Dynamo Moskva
30	F	Anatoli Semenov	6 ft 2 in (188 cm)	190 lb (86 kg)	March 5, 1962 (aged 25)	(Soviet Union) Dynamo Moskva
16	F	Sergei Svetlov	6 ft 2 in (188 cm)	194 lb (88 kg)	January 17, 1961 (aged 26)	(Soviet Union) Dynamo Moskva
