= 1989 NHL entry draft =

1989 North American ice hockey draft

General information
- Date: June 17, 1989
- Location: Met Center; Bloomington, Minnesota, U.S.

Overview
- 252 total selections in 12 rounds
- First selection: (Sweden) Mats Sundin (Quebec Nordiques)
- Hall of Famers: 4: C Mats Sundin; D Nicklas Lidstrom; C Sergei Fedorov; RW Pavel Bure

The 1989 NHL entry draft was the 27th draft for the National Hockey League. It was held on June 17 at the Met Center in Bloomington, Minnesota. The Detroit Red Wings' 1989 draft has been noted as exceptionally successful, with 5,955 total NHL games played by the players selected.

The last active player in the NHL from this draft class was Nicklas Lidstrom, who retired after the 2011–12 season.

== Selections by round ==
Below are the selections in the 1989 NHL entry draft. Club teams are located in North America unless otherwise noted.

=== Round one ===
= NHL All-Star team ·	= NHL All-Star (Note: Players are identified as an All-Star if they were selected for the All-Star game at any time in their career.) ·	= NHL All-Star and NHL All-Star team ·	= Hall of Famers

#	Player	Nationality	NHL team	College/junior/club team
1	Mats Sundin (C)	Sweden	Quebec Nordiques	Nacka HK (Sweden)
2	Dave Chyzowski (LW)	Canada	New York Islanders	Kamloops Blazers (WHL)
3	Scott Thornton (C)	Canada	Toronto Maple Leafs	Belleville Bulls (OHL)
4	Stu Barnes (C)	Canada	Winnipeg Jets	Tri-City Americans (WHL)
5	Bill Guerin (RW)	United States	New Jersey Devils	Springfield Olympics (NEJHL)
6	Adam Bennett (D)	Canada	Chicago Blackhawks	Sudbury Wolves (OHL)
7	Doug Zmolek (D)	United States	Minnesota North Stars	Rochester John Marshall High School (USHS–MN)
8	Jason Herter (D)	Canada	Vancouver Canucks	University of North Dakota (WCHA)
9	Jason Marshall (D)	Canada	St. Louis Blues	Vernon Lakers (BCJHL)
10	Bobby Holik (C)	Czechoslovakia	Hartford Whalers	Dukla Jihlava (Czechoslovakia)
11	Mike Sillinger (C)	Canada	Detroit Red Wings	Regina Pats (WHL)
12	Rob Pearson (RW)	Canada	Toronto Maple Leafs (from Philadelphia)^{1}	Belleville Bulls (OHL)
13	Lindsay Vallis (RW)	Canada	Montreal Canadiens (from New York)^{2}	Seattle Thunderbirds (WHL)
14	Kevin Haller (D)	Canada	Buffalo Sabres	Regina Pats (WHL)
15	Jason Soules (D)	Canada	Edmonton Oilers	Niagara Falls Thunder (OHL)
16	Jamie Heward (D)	Canada	Pittsburgh Penguins	Regina Pats (WHL)
17	Shayne Stevenson (C)	Canada	Boston Bruins	Kitchener Rangers (OHL)
18	Jason Miller (C)	Canada	New Jersey Devils (from Los Angeles via Edmonton)^{3}	Medicine Hat Tigers (WHL)
19	Olaf Kolzig (G)	West Germany	Washington Capitals	Tri-City Americans (WHL)
20	Steven Rice (RW)	Canada	New York Rangers (from Montreal)^{4}	Kitchener Rangers (OHL)
21	Steve Bancroft (D)	Canada	Toronto Maple Leafs (from Calgary via Philadelphia)^{5}	Belleville Bulls (OHL)
^{Reference:}

1. Philadelphia's first-round pick went to Toronto as the result of a trade on March 6, 1989, that sent Ken Wregget to Philadelphia in exchange for Philadelphia's first-round pick (# 21 overall) in 1989 Entry Draft and this pick.
2. The Rangers' first-round pick went to Montreal as the result of a trade on January 27, 1988, that had Montreal's option to swap first-round picks with the Rangers in exchange for Chris Nilan.
3. Montreal's first-round pick went to the Rangers as the result of a trade on January 27, 1988, that sent Chris Nilan to the Rangers in exchange for Montreal's option to swap first-round picks with the Rangers.
4. Edmonton's first-round pick went to New Jersey as the result of a trade on June 17, 1989, that sent Corey Foster to Edmonton in exchange for this pick.
  Edmonton previously acquired this pick as the result of a trade on August 9, 1988, that sent Wayne Gretzky, Mike Krushelnyski and Marty McSorley to Los Angeles in exchange for Jimmy Carson, Martin Gelinas, cash, Los Angeles' first-round pick in the 1991 entry draft, first-round pick in the 1993 entry draft and this pick.
5. Philadelphia's first-round pick went to Toronto as the result of a trade on March 6, 1989, that sent Ken Wregget to Philadelphia in exchange for Philadelphia's first-round pick (# 12 overall) in 1989 Entry Draft and this pick.
  Philadelphia previously acquired this pick as the result of a trade on March 9, 1987, that sent Brad McCrimmon to Calgary in exchange for Calgary's third-round pick in the 1988 entry draft and this pick.

=== Round two ===
#	Player	Nationality	NHL team	College/junior/club team
22	Adam Foote (D)	Canada	Quebec Nordiques	Sault Ste. Marie Greyhounds (OHL)
23	Travis Green (C)	Canada	New York Islanders	Spokane Chiefs (WHL)
24	Kent Manderville (LW)	Canada	Calgary Flames (from Toronto)^{1}	Notre Dame Hounds (SJHL)
25	Dan Ratushny (D)	Canada	Winnipeg Jets	Cornell University (ECAC)
26	Jarrod Skalde (C)	Canada	New Jersey Devils	Oshawa Generals (OHL)
27	Mike Speer (D)	Canada	Chicago Blackhawks	Guelph Platers (OHL)
28	Mike Craig (RW)	Canada	Minnesota North Stars	Oshawa Generals (OHL)
29	Rob Woodward (LW)	United States	Vancouver Canucks	Deerfield Academy (USHS–MA)
30	Patrice Brisebois (D)	Canada	Montreal Canadiens (from St. Louis)^{2}	Laval Titan (QMJHL)
31	Rick Corriveau (D)	Canada	St. Louis Blues (from Hartford)^{3}	London Knights (OHL)
32	Bob Boughner (D)	Canada	Detroit Red Wings	Sault Ste. Marie Greyhounds (OHL)
33	Greg Johnson (C)	Canada	Philadelphia Flyers	Thunder Bay Flyers (USHL)
34	Patrik Juhlin (LW)	Sweden	Philadelphia Flyers (from the Rangers)^{4}	VIK Vasteras IK (Sweden)
35	Byron Dafoe (G)	Canada	Washington Capitals (from Buffalo)^{5}	Portland Winter Hawks (WHL)
36	Richard Borgo (RW)	Canada	Edmonton Oilers	Kitchener Rangers (OHL)
37	Paul Laus (D)	Canada	Pittsburgh Penguins	Niagara Falls Thunder (OHL)
38	Mike Parson (G)	Canada	Boston Bruins	Guelph Platers (OHL)
39	Brent Thompson (D)	Canada	Los Angeles Kings	Medicine Hat Tigers (WHL)
40	Jason Prosofsky (RW)	Canada	New York Rangers (from Washington)^{6}	Medicine Hat Tigers (WHL)
41	Steve Larouche (C)	Canada	Montreal Canadiens	Trois-Rivieres Draveurs (QMJHL)
42	Ted Drury (C)	United States	Calgary Flames	Fairfield College Preparatory School (USHS–CT)
^{Reference:}

1. Toronto's second-round pick went to Calgary as the result of a trade on June 16, 1989, that sent Rob Ramage to Toronto in exchange for this pick.
2. St. Louis' second-round pick went to Montreal as the result of a trade on August 9, 1988, that sent Sergio Momesso and Vincent Riendeau to St. Louis in exchange for Jocelyn Lemieux, Darrell May and this pick.
3. Hartford's second-round pick went to St. Louis as the result of a trade on March 8, 1988, that sent Charlie Bourgeois and St. Louis' third-round pick in the 1989 Entry Draft to Hartford in exchange for this pick.
4. The Rangers' second-round pick went to Philadelphia as the result of a trade on December 18, 1986, that sent Bob Froese to the Rangers in exchange for Kjell Samuelsson and this pick.
5. Buffalo's second-round pick went to Washington as the result of a trade on March 6, 1989, that sent Grant Ledyard, Clint Malarchuk and Washington's sixth-round pick in the 1991 entry draft to Buffalo in exchange for Calle Johansson and this pick.
6. Washington's second-round pick went to the Rangers as the result of a trade on January 1, 1987, that sent Bob Crawford, Kelly Miller and Mike Ridley to Washington in exchange for Bobby Carpenter and this pick.

=== Round three ===
#	Player	Nationality	NHL team	College/junior/club team
43	Stephane Morin (C)	Canada	Quebec Nordiques	Chicoutimi Sagueneens (QMJHL)
44	Jason Zent (LW)	United States	New York Islanders	Nichols School (USHS–NY)
45	Rob Zamuner (LW)	Canada	New York Rangers (from Toronto)^{1}	Guelph Platers (OHL)
46	Jason Cirone (C)	Canada	Winnipeg Jets (from New Jersey)^{2}	Cornwall Royals (OHL)
47	Scott Pellerin (LW)	Canada	New Jersey Devils	University of Maine (Hockey East)
48	Bob Kellogg (D)	United States	Chicago Blackhawks	Springfield Olympics (EJHL)
49	Louie DeBrusk (LW)	Canada	New York Rangers (from Minnesota)^{3}	London Knights (OHL)
50	Veli-Pekka Kautonen (D)	Finland	Calgary Flames (from Vancouver)^{4}	HIFK (Finland)
51	Pierre Sevigny (LW)	Canada	Montreal Canadiens (from St. Louis)^{5}	Verdun Junior Canadiens (QMJHL)
52	Blair Atcheynum (RW)	Canada	Hartford Whalers (from Hartford via St. Louis)^{6}	Moose Jaw Warriors (WHL)
53	Nicklas Lidstrom (D)	Sweden	Detroit Red Wings	VIK Vasteras IK (Sweden)
54	John Tanner (G)	Canada	Quebec Nordiques (from Philadelphia)^{7}	Peterborough Petes (OHL)
55	Denny Felsner (LW)	United States	St. Louis Blues (from the Rangers via Winnipeg)^{8}	University of Michigan (CCHA)
56	Scott Thomas (RW)	United States	Buffalo Sabres	Nichols School (USHS–NY)
57	Wes Walz (C)	Canada	Boston Bruins (from Edmonton)^{9}	Lethbridge Hurricanes (WHL)
58	John Brill (LW/RW)	United States	Pittsburgh Penguins	Grand Rapids High School (USHS–MN)
59	Jim Mathieson (D)	Canada	Washington Capitals	Regina Pats (WHL)
60	Murray Garbutt (C)	Canada	Minnesota North Stars (from Los Angeles via the Rangers)^{10}	Medicine Hat Tigers (WHL)
61	Jason Woolley (D)	Canada	Washington Capitals	Michigan State University (CCHA)
62	Kris Draper (C)	Canada	Winnipeg Jets (from Montreal via St. Louis)^{11}	Canadian National team
63	Corey Lyons (RW)	Canada	Calgary Flames	Lethbridge Hurricanes (WHL)
^{Reference:}

1. Toronto's third-round pick went to Montreal as the result of a trade on March 5, 1987, that sent Mark Osborne to Toronto in exchange for Jeff Jackson and this pick.
2. New Jersey's third-round pick went to Winnipeg as the result of a trade on June 17, 1989, that sent Winnipeg's third-round pick in the 1990 entry draft to New Jersey in exchange for this pick.
3. Minnesota's third-round pick went to the Rangers as the result of a trade on June 13, 1988, that sent Mark Hardy to MInnesota in exchange for future considerations (this pick).
4. Vancouver's third-round pick went to Calgary as the result of a trade on September 6, 1988, that sent Steve Bozek and Paul Reinhart to Vancouver in exchange for this pick.
5. St. Louis' third-round pick went to Montreal as the result of a trade on October 13, 1987, that sent Gaston Gingras and Montreal's third-round pick in the 1989 Entry Draft to St. Louis in exchange for Larry Trader and this pick.
6. Hartford's third-round pick was re-acquired as the result of a trade on March 8, 1988, that sent Hartford's second-round pick in the 1989 Entry Draft in exchange for Charlie Bourgeois and this pick.
  St. Louis previously acquired this pick as the result of a trade with Hartford on October 5, 1987, that sent that sent Mark Reeds to Hartford in exchange for this pick.
7. Philadelphia's' third-round pick went to Quebec as the result of a trade on July 25, 1988, that sent Terry Carkner to Philadelphia in exchange for Greg Smyth and this pick.
8. Winnipeg's' third-round pick went to St. Louis as the result of a trade on June 17, 1989, that sent Greg Paslawski and St. Louis's third-round pick in 1989 Entry Draft to Winnipeg in exchange for Winnipeg's second-round pick in 1991 entry draft and this pick.
  Winnipeg previously acquired this pick as the result of a trade with the Rangers on June 8, 1987, that sent that sent Brian Mullen and Winnipeg's tenth-round pick in 1987 entry draft to the Ranger's in exchange for the Rangers' fifth-round pick in the 1988 entry draft and this pick.
9. Edmonton's third-round pick went to Boston as the result of a trade on June 17, 1989, that sent Tommy Lehmann to Edmonton in exchange for this pick.
10. The Rangers' third-round pick went to Minnesota as the result of a trade on October 11, 1988, that sent Brian Lawton, Igor Liba and the rights to Rick Bennett to the Rangers in exchange for Paul Jerrard, Mark Tinordi, the rights to Mike Sullivan, the rights to Bret Barnett and this pick.
  The Rangers previously acquired this pick as the result of a trade with Los Angeles on March 10, 1987, that sent that sent Bobby Carpenter and Tom Laidlaw to Los Angeles in exchange for Jeff Crossman, Marcel Dionne and this pick.
11. St. Louis' third-round pick went to Winnipeg as the result of a trade on June 17, 1989, that sent Winnipeg's third-round pick in 1989 Entry Draft and second-round pick in 1991 entry draft in exchange for Greg Paslawski and this pick.
  St. Louis previously acquired this pick as the result of a trade with Los Montreal on October 13, 1987, that sent that sent Larry Trader and St. Louis' third-round pick in 1989 Entry Draft to Montreal in exchange for Gaston Gingras and this pick.

=== Round four ===
#	Player	Nationality	NHL team	College/junior/club team
64	Mark Brownschidle (D)	United States	Winnipeg Jets (from Quebec)^{1}	Boston University (Hockey East)
65	Brent Grieve (LW)	Canada	New York Islanders	Oshawa Generals (OHL)
66	Matt Martin (D)	United States	Toronto Maple Leafs	Avon Old Farms (USHS–CT)
67	Jim Cummins (RW)	United States	New York Rangers (from Winnipeg)^{2}	Michigan State University (CCHA)
68	Niklas Andersson (LW)	Sweden	Quebec Nordiques (from New Jersey)^{3}	Vastra Frolunda HC (Sweden)
69	Allain Roy (G)	Canada	Winnipeg Jets (from Chicago)^{4}	Harvard University (ECAC)
70	Robert Reichel (C)	Czechoslovakia	Calgary Flames (from Minnesota)^{5}	HC CHZ Litvinov (Czechoslovakia)
71	Brett Hauer (D)	United States	Vancouver Canucks	Richfield High School (USHS–MN)
72	Reid Simpson (LW)	Canada	Philadelphia Flyers (from St. Louis)^{6}	Prince Albert Raiders (WHL)
73	Jim McKenzie (LW)	Canada	Hartford Whalers	Victoria Cougars (WHL)
74	Sergei Fedorov (C)	Soviet Union	Detroit Red Wings	CSKA Moscow (USSR)
75	J. F. Quintin (LW)	Canada	Minnesota North Stars (from Philadelphia)^{7}	Shawinigan Cataractes (QMJHL)
76	Eric Dubois (D)	Canada	Quebec Nordiques (from the Rangers)^{8}	Laval Titan (QMJHL)
77	Doug MacDonald (C)	Canada	Buffalo Sabres	University of Wisconsin (NCAA)
78	Josef Beranek (C)	Czechoslovakia	Edmonton Oilers	HC CHZ Litvinov (Czechoslovakia)
79	Todd Nelson (D)	Canada	Pittsburgh Penguins	Prince Albert Raiders (WHL)
80	Jackson Penney (RW)	Canada	Boston Bruins	Victoria Cougars (WHL)
81	Jim Maher (D)	United States	Los Angeles Kings	University of Illinois at Chicago (CCHA)
82	Trent Klatt (RW)	United States	Washington Capitals	Osseo Senior High School (USHS–MN)
83	Andre Racicot (G)	Canada	Montreal Canadiens	Granby Bisons (QMJHL)
84	Ryan O'Leary (C)	United States	Calgary Flames	Hermantown Senior School (USHS–MN)
^{Reference:}

1. Quebec's fourth-round pick went to Winnipeg as the result of a trade on January 5, 1987, that sent Bill Derlago to Quebec in exchange for this pick.
2. Winnipeg's fourth-round pick went to the Rangers as the result of a trade on September 30, 1987, that sent George McPhee to Winnipeg in exchange for this pick.
3. New Jersey's fourth-round pick went to Quebec as the result of a trade on December 12, 1988, that sent Tommy Albelin to New Jersey in exchange for this pick.
4. Chicago's fourth-round pick went to Winnipeg as the result of a trade on January 19, 1989, that sent Alain Chevrier to Chicago in exchange for this pick.
5. Minnesota's fourth-round pick went to Calgary as the result of a trade on March 4, 1989, that sent Perry Berezan and Shane Churla to Minnesota in exchange for Brian MacLellan and this pick.
6. St. Louis fourth-round pick went to Philadelphia as the result of a trade on March 8, 1988, that sent Gordie Roberts to St. Louis in exchange for this pick.
7. Philadelphia's fourth-round pick went to Minnesota as the result of a trade on February 9, 1988, that sent Gordie Roberts to Philadelphia in exchange for this pick.
8. The Rangers' fourth-round pick went to Quebec as the result of a trade on August 1, 1988, that sent Jason Lafreniere and Normand Rochefort to the Rangers in exchange for Bruce Bell, Jari Gronstrand, Walt Poddubny and this pick.

=== Round five ===
#	Player	Nationality	NHL team	College/junior/club team
85	Kevin Kaiser (LW)	Canada	Quebec Nordiques	University of Minnesota Duluth (WCHA)
86	Jace Reed (D)	United States	New York Islanders	Grand Rapids High School (USHS–MN)
87	Pat MacLeod (D)	Canada	Minnesota North Stars (from Toronto via Philadelphia)^{1}	Kamloops Blazers (WHL)
88	Aaron Miller (D)	United States	New York Rangers (from Winnipeg)^{2}	Niagara Falls Canucks (GHJHL)
89	Mike Heinke (G)	United States	New Jersey Devils	Avon Old Farms (USHS–CT)
90	Steve Young (RW)	Canada	New York Islanders (from Chicago)^{3}	Moose Jaw Warriors (WHL)
91	Bryan Schoen (G)	United States	Minnesota North Stars	Minnetonka High School (USHS–MN)
92	Peter White (C)	Canada	Edmonton Oilers (from Vancouver via Philadelphia and Vancouver)^{4}	Michigan State University (CCHA)
93	Daniel Laperriere (D)	Canada	St. Louis Blues	St. Lawrence University (ECAC)
94	James Black (D)	Canada	Hartford Whalers	Portland Winter Hawks (WHL)
95	Shawn McCosh (C)	Canada	Detroit Red Wings	Niagara Falls Thunder (OHL)
96	Keith Carney (D)	United States	Toronto Maple Leafs (from Philadelphia)^{5}	Mount Saint Charles Academy (USHS–RI)
97	Rhys Hollyman (D)	Canada	Minnesota North Stars (from the Rangers)^{6}	Miami University (CCHA)
98	Ken Sutton (D)	Canada	Buffalo Sabres	Saskatoon Blades (WHL)
99	Kevin O'Sullivan (D)	United States	New York Islanders (from Edmonton)^{7}	Catholic Memorial School (USHS–MA)
100	Tom Nevers (C)	United States	Pittsburgh Penguins	Edina High School (USHS–MN)
101	Mark Montanari (C)	Canada	Boston Bruins	Kitchener Rangers (OHL)
102	Eric Ricard (D)	Canada	Los Angeles Kings	Granby Bisons (QMJHL)
103	Tom Newman (G)	United States	Los Angeles Kings (from Washington)^{8}	Blaine High School (USHS–MN)
104	Marc Deschamps (D)	Canada	Montreal Canadiens	Cornell University (ECAC)
105	Francis Kearney (LW)	United States	Calgary Flames	Hermantown Senior School (USHS–MN)
^{Reference:}

1. Philadelphia's fifth-round pick went to Minnesota as the result of a trade on December 8, 1988, that sent Moe Mantha Jr. to Philadelphia in exchange for this pick.
  Philadelphia previously acquired this pick as the result of a trade on December 4, 1987, that sent Mike Stothers to Toronto in exchange for future considerations. The consideration became this pick but the completion date of the trade is unknown.
2. Winnipeg's fifth-round pick went to the Rangers as the result of a trade on December 16, 1987, that sent Paul Boutilier to Winnipeg in exchange for this pick future considerations. The consideration became this pick but the completion date of the trade is unknown.
3. Chicago's fifth-round pick went to the Islanders as the result of a trade on March 7, 1989, that sent Greg Gilbert to Chicago in exchange for this pick.
4. Vancouver's fifth-round pick then went to Edmonton as the result of a trade on March 7, 1989, that sent Greg Adams and Doug Smith to Vancouver in exchange for John LeBlanc and this pick.
  Vancouver's fifth-round pick was re-acquired as the result of a trade on March 1, 1988, that sent Willie Huber to Philadelphia in exchange for Paul Lawless and this pick.
  Vancouver's fifth-round pick went to Philadelphia as the result of a trade on June 13, 1987, that sent Philadelphia's fifth-round pick in the 1987 entry draft in exchange for this pick.
5. Philadelphia's fifth-round pick then went to Toronto as the result of a trade on February 7, 1989, that sent Al Secord to Philadelphia in exchange for this pick.
6. The Rangers' fifth-round pick then went to Minnesota as the result of a trade on December 9, 1988, that sent Mark Hardy to the Rangers in exchange for Larry Bernard and this pick.
7. Edmonton's fifth-round pick then went to the Islanders as the result of a trade on February 15, 1989, that sent Tomas Jonsson to Edmonton in exchange for future considerations (this pick).
8. Washington's fifth-round pick then went to Los Angeles as the result of a trade on June 17, 1989, that sent Alan May to Washington in exchange for this pick.

=== Round six ===
#	Player	Nationality	NHL team	College/junior/club team
106	Dan Lambert (D)	Canada	Quebec Nordiques	Swift Current Broncos (WHL)
107	Bill Pye (G)	United States	Buffalo Sabres (from the Islanders)^{1}	Northern Michigan University (WCHA)
108	Dave Burke (D)	United States	Toronto Maple Leafs	Cornell University (ECAC)
109	Dan Bylsma (RW)	United States	Winnipeg Jets	Bowling Green State University (CCHA)
110	David Emma (RW)	United States	New Jersey Devils	Boston College (NCAA)
111	Tommi Pullola (LW)	Finland	Chicago Blackhawks	Sport (Finland)
112	Scott Cashman (G)	Canada	Minnesota North Stars	Kanata (COJHL)
113	Pavel Bure (RW)	Soviet Union	Vancouver Canucks	CSKA Moscow (USSR)
114	David Roberts (LW)	United States	St. Louis Blues	Avon Old Farms (USHS–CT)
115	Jerome Bechard (LW)	Canada	Hartford Whalers	Moose Jaw Warriors (WHL)
116	Dallas Drake (RW)	Canada	Detroit Red Wings	Northern Michigan University (NCAA)
117	Niklas Eriksson (RW)	Sweden	Philadelphia Flyers	Leksands IF (Sweden)
118	Joby Messier (D)	Canada	New York Rangers	Michigan State University (CCHA)
119	Mike Barkley (C)	Canada	Buffalo Sabres	University of Maine (Hockey East)
120	Anatoli Semenov (C)	Soviet Union	Edmonton Oilers	Dynamo Moscow (USSR)
121	Mike Markovich (D)	United States	Pittsburgh Penguins	University of Denver (WCHA)
122	Steven Foster (D)	United States	Boston Bruins	Catholic Memorial School (USHS–MA)
123	Daniel Rydmark (C)	Sweden	Los Angeles Kings	Farjestad BK (Sweden)
124	Derek Frenette (LW)	Canada	St. Louis Blues (from Washington)^{2}	Ferris State University (CCHA)
125	Mike Doers (RW)	United States	Toronto Maple Leafs (from Montreal)^{3}	Northwood School (USHS–NY)
126	Mike Needham (RW)	Canada	Pittsburgh Penguins (from Calgary)^{4}	Kamloops Blazers (WHL)
^{Reference:}

1. The Islanders' sixth-round pick went to Buffalo as the result of a trade on June 17, 1989, that sent Joe Reekie to the Islanders in exchange for this pick.
2. Washington's sixth-round pick went to St. Louis as the result of a trade on October 19, 1988, that sent Rob Whistle to Washington in exchange for this pick. The trade was for a conditional pick in 1989 Entry Draft. The condition – St. Louis receives a 5th-rd pick if Whistle played in 20 games or more in the 1988-89 or a 6th-rd pick if played in less than 20 goals - was not converted as he did not play in the NHL that season.
3. Montreal's sixth-round pick went to Toronto as the result of a trade on November 7, 1988, that sent Russ Courtnall to Montreal in exchange for John Kordic and this pick.
4. Calgary's sixth-round pick went to Pittsburgh as the result of a trade on January 9, 1989, that sent Steve Guenette to Calgary in exchange for this pick.

=== Round seven ===
#	Player	Nationality	NHL team	College/junior/club team
127	Sergei Mylnikov (G)	Soviet Union	Quebec Nordiques	Traktor Chelyabinsk (USSR)
128	Jon Larson (D)	United States	New York Islanders	Roseau High School (USHS–MN)
129	Keith Merkler (LW)	United States	Toronto Maple Leafs	Portledge School (USHS–NY)
130	Pekka Peltola (RW)	Finland	Winnipeg Jets	HPK (Finland)
131	Doug Evans (D)	United States	Winnipeg Jets (from New Jersey)^{1}	University of Michigan (CCHA)
132	Tracy Egeland (RW)	Canada	Chicago Blackhawks	Prince Alberta Raiders (WHL)
133	Brett Harkins (LW)	United States	New York Islanders (from Minnesota)^{2}	Detroit Compuware Ambassadors (NAHL)
134	Jim Revenberg (RW)	Canada	Vancouver Canucks	Windsor Spitfires (OHL)
135	Jeff Batters (D)	Canada	St. Louis Blues	University of Alaska Anchorage (NCAA Independent)
136	Scott Daniels (LW)	Canada	Hartford Whalers	Regina Pats (WHL)
137	Scott Zygulski (D)	United States	Detroit Red Wings	Culver Military Academy (USHS–IN)
138	Jack Callahan (C)	United States	Philadelphia Flyers	Belmont Hill School (USHS–MA)
139	Greg Leahy (C)	United States	New York Rangers	Portland Winter Hawks (WHL)
140	Davis Payne (RW)	Canada	Edmonton Oilers (from Buffalo)^{3}	Michigan Technological University (WCHA)
141	Sergei Yashin (LW)	Soviet Union	Edmonton Oilers	Dinamo Riga (USSR)
142	Pat Schafhauser (D)	United States	Pittsburgh Penguins	Hill-Murray School (USHS–MN)
143	Otto Hascak (C)	Czechoslovakia	Boston Bruins	Dukla Trencin (Czechoslovakia)
144	Ted Kramer (RW)	United States	Los Angeles Kings	University of Michigan (CCHA)
145	Dave Lorentz (LW)	Canada	Washington Capitals	Peterborough Petes (OHL)
146	Craig Ferguson (C)	United States	Montreal Canadiens	Yale University (ECAC)
147	Alex Nikolic (LW)	Canada	Calgary Flames	Cornell University (ECAC)
^{Reference:}

1. New Jersey's seventh-round pick went to Winnipeg as the result of a trade on July 19, 1988, that sent Steve Rooney and Winnipeg's third-round pick in the 1990 entry draft to New Jersey in exchange for Alain Chevrier and this pick.
2. Buffalo's seventh-round pick went to Edmonton as the result of a trade on February 11, 1988, that sent Scott Metcalfe and Edmonton's ninth-round pick in the 1989 Entry Draft to Buffalo in exchange for Steve Dykstra and this pick.
3. Minnesota's seventh-round pick went to the Islanders as the result of a trade on March 8, 1988, that sent Gord Dineen to Minnesota in exchange for Chris Pryor and this pick.

=== Round eight ===
#	Player	Nationality	NHL team	College/junior/club team
148	Paul Krake (G)	Canada	Quebec Nordiques	University of Alaska Anchorage (NCAA Independent)
149	Phil Huber (C)	Canada	New York Islanders	Kamloops Blazers (WHL)
150	Derek Langille (D)	Canada	Toronto Maple Leafs	North Bay Centennials (OHL)
151	Jim Solly (LW)	Canada	Winnipeg Jets	Bowling Green State University (CCHA)
152	Sergei Starikov (D)	Soviet Union	New Jersey Devils	CSKA Moscow (USSR)
153	Milan Tichy (D)	Czechoslovakia	Chicago Blackhawks	Plzeň (Czechoslovakia)
154	Jon Pratt (LW)	United States	Minnesota North Stars	Pingree High School (USHS–MA)
155	Rob Sangster (LW)	Canada	Vancouver Canucks	Kitchener Rangers (OHL)
156	Kevin Plager (RW)	United States	St. Louis Blues	Parkway North High School (USHS–MO)
157	Raymond Saumier (RW)	Canada	Hartford Whalers	Trois-Rivieres Draveurs (QMJHL)
158	Andy Suhy (D)	United States	Detroit Red Wings	Western Michigan University (CCHA)
159	Sverre Sears (D)	United States	Philadelphia Flyers	Princeton University (ECAC)
160	Greg Spenrath (D)	Canada	New York Rangers	Tri-City Americans (WHL)
161	Derek Plante (C)	United States	Buffalo Sabres	Cloquet High School (USHS–MN)
162	Darcy Martini (D)	Canada	Edmonton Oilers	Michigan Technological University (NCAA)
163	David Shute (LW)	United States	Pittsburgh Penguins	Victoria Cougars (WHL)
164	Rick Allain (D)	Canada	Boston Bruins	Kitchener Rangers (OHL)
165	Sean Whyte (RW)	Canada	Los Angeles Kings	Guelph Platers (OHL)
166	Dean Holoien (RW)	Canada	Washington Capitals	Saskatoon Blades (WHL)
167	Patrick Lebeau (LW)	Canada	Montreal Canadiens	Saint-Jean Lynx (QMJHL)
168	Kevin Wortman (D)	United States	Calgary Flames	American International College (ECAC East)
^{Reference:}

=== Round nine ===
#	Player	Nationality	NHL team	College/junior/club team
169	Vyacheslav Bykov (C)	Soviet Union	Quebec Nordiques	CSKA Moscow (USSR)
170	Matthew Robbins (C)	United States	New York Islanders	New Hampton School (USHS–NH)
171	Jeffrey St. Laurent (RW)	United States	Toronto Maple Leafs	Berwick Academy (USHS–ME)
172	Stephane Gauvin (LW)	Canada	Winnipeg Jets	Cornell University (ECAC)
173	Andre Faust (C)	Canada	New Jersey Devils	Princeton University (ECAC)
174	Jason Greyerbiehl (LW)	Canada	Chicago Blackhawks	Colgate University (ECAC)
175	Kenneth Blum (C)	United States	Minnesota North Stars	St. Joseph Central High School (USHS–MA)
176	Sandy Moger (C)	Canada	Vancouver Canucks	Lake Superior State University (CCHA)
177	John Roderick (D)	United States	St. Louis Blues	Cambridge Rindge and Latin School (USHS–MA)
178	Michel Picard (LW)	Canada	Hartford Whalers	Trois-Rivieres Draveurs (QMJHL)
179	Bob Jones (LW)	Canada	Detroit Red Wings	Sault Ste. Marie Greyhounds (OHL)
180	Glen Wisser (RW)	United States	Philadelphia Flyers	Philadelphia Junior Flyers (MetJHL)
181	Mark Bavis (C)	United States	New York Rangers	Cushing Academy (USHS–MA)
182	Jim Giacin (C)	United States	Los Angeles Kings (from Buffalo)^{1}	Culver Military Academy (USHS–IN)
183	Donald Audette (RW)	Canada	Buffalo Sabres (from Edmonton)^{2}	Laval Titan (QMJHL)
184	Andrew Wolf (D)	Canada	Pittsburgh Penguins	Victoria Cougars (WHL)
185	James Lavish (RW)	United States	Boston Bruins	Deerfield Academy (USHS–MA)
186	Martin Maskarinec (D)	Czechoslovakia	Los Angeles Kings	Sparta Prague (Czechoslovakia)
187	Victor Gervais (C)	Canada	Washington Capitals	Seattle Thunderbirds (WHL)
188	Roy Mitchell (D)	Canada	Montreal Canadiens	Portland Winter Hawks (WHL)
189	Sergey Gomolyako (C)	Soviet Union	Calgary Flames	Traktor Chelyabinsk (USSR)
^{Reference:}

1. Buffalo's ninth-round pick went to Los Angeles as the result of a trade on October 21, 1988, that sent Larry Playfair to Buffalo in exchange for Bob Logan and this pick.
2. Edmonton's ninth-round pick went to Buffalo as the result of a trade on February 11, 1988, that sent Steve Dykstra and Edmonton's seventh-round pick in the 1989 Entry Draft to Buffalo in exchange for Scott Metcalfe and this pick.

=== Round ten ===
#	Player	Nationality	NHL team	College/junior/club team
190	Andrei Khomutov (RW)	Soviet Union	Quebec Nordiques	CSKA Moscow (USSR)
191	Vladimir Malakhov (D)	Soviet Union	New York Islanders	CSKA Moscow (USSR)
192	Justin Tomberlin (C)	United States	Toronto Maple Leafs	Greenway High School (USHS–MN)
193	Joe Larson (C)	United States	Winnipeg Jets	Minnetonka High School (USHS–MN)
194	Mark Astley (D)	Canada	Buffalo Sabres (from New Jersey)^{1}	Lake Superior State University (CCHA)
195	Matt Saunders (LW)	Canada	Chicago Blackhawks	Northeastern University (Hockey East)
196	Arturs Irbe (G)	Soviet Union	Minnesota North Stars	Dinamo Riga (USSR)
197	Gus Morschauser (G)	Canada	Vancouver Canucks	Kitchener Rangers (OHL)
198	John Valo (D)	United States	St. Louis Blues	Detroit Compuware Ambassadors (NAHL)
199	Trevor Buchanan (LW)	Canada	Hartford Whalers	Kamloops Blazers (WHL)
200	Greg Bignell (D)	Canada	Detroit Red Wings	Belleville Bulls (OHL)
201	Al Kummu (D)	Canada	Philadelphia Flyers	Humboldt Broncos (SJHL)
202	Roman Oksiuta (RW)	Soviet Union	New York Rangers	Khimik Voskresensk (USSR)
203	John Nelson (C)	Canada	Buffalo Sabres	Toronto Marlboros (OHL)
204	Rick Judson (LW)	United States	Detroit Red Wings (from Edmonton)^{2}	University of Illinois at Chicago (CCHA)
205	Greg Hagen (RW)	United States	Pittsburgh Penguins	Hill-Murray High School (USHS–MN)
206	Geoff Simpson (D)	Canada	Boston Bruins	Estevan Bruins (SJHL)
207	Jim Hiller (RW)	Canada	Los Angeles Kings	Melville Millionaires (SJHL)
208	Jiri Vykoukal (D)	Czechoslovakia	Washington Capitals	TJ DS Olomouc (Czechoslovakia)
209	Ed Henrich (D)	United States	Montreal Canadiens	Nichols School (USHS–NY)
210	Dan Sawyer (D)	United States	Calgary Flames	Ramapo High School (USHS–NJ)

1. New Jersey's tenth-round pick went to Buffalo as the result of a trade on June 13, 1987, that sent Tom Kurvers to New Jersey in exchange for New Jersey's third-round pick in 1987 entry draft and this pick.
2. Edmonton's tenth-round pick went to Detroit as the result of a trade on January 3, 1989, that sent Miroslav Frycer to Edmonton in exchange for this pick.

=== Round eleven ===
#	Player	Nationality	NHL team	College/junior/club team
211	Byron Witkowski (LW)	Canada	Quebec Nordiques	Nipawin Hawks (SJHL)
212	Kelly Ens (C)	Canada	New York Islanders	Lethbridge Hurricanes (WHL)
213	Mike Jackson (RW)	Canada	Toronto Maple Leafs	Toronto Marlboros (OHL)
214	Bradley Podiak (LW)	United States	Winnipeg Jets	Wayzata High School (USHS–MN)
215	Jason Simon (LW)	Canada	New Jersey Devils	Windsor Spitfires (OHL)
216	Mike Kozak (RW)	Canada	Chicago Blackhawks	Clarkson University (ECAC)
217	Tom Pederson (D)	United States	Minnesota North Stars	University of Minnesota (WCHA)
218	Hayden O'Rear (D)	United States	Vancouver Canucks	Lathrop High School (USHS–AK)
219	Brian Lukowski (G)	United States	St. Louis Blues	Niagara Falls Canucks (GHJHL)
220	John Battice (D)	Canada	Hartford Whalers	London Knights (OHL)
221	Vladimir Konstantinov (D)	Soviet Union	Detroit Red Wings	CSKA Moscow (USSR)
222	Matt Brait (D)	Canada	Philadelphia Flyers	St. Michael's Buzzers (MetJHL)
223	Steve Locke (LW)	Canada	New York Rangers	Niagara Falls Thunder (OHL)
224	Todd Henderson (G)	Canada	Buffalo Sabres	Thunder Bay Flyers (USHL)
225	Roman Bozek (RW)	Czechoslovakia	Edmonton Oilers	Motor Ceske Budejovice (Czechoslovakia)
226	Scott Farrell (D)	Canada	Pittsburgh Penguins	Spokane Chiefs (WHL)
227	David Franzosa (LW)	United States	Boston Bruins	Boston College (Hockey East)
228	Steve Jaques (D)	Canada	Los Angeles Kings	Tri-City Americans (WHL)
229	Andrei Sidorov (LW)	Soviet Union	Washington Capitals	Dynamo Kharkov (USSR)
230	Justin Duberman (RW)	United States	Montreal Canadiens	University of North Dakota (WCHA)
231	Alexander Yudin (D)	Soviet Union	Calgary Flames	Dynamo Moscow (USSR)

=== Round twelve ===
#	Player	Nationality	NHL team	College/junior/club team
232	Noel Rahn (C)	United States	Quebec Nordiques	Edina High School (USHS–MN)
233	Iain Fraser (C)	Canada	New York Islanders	Oshawa Generals (OHL)
234	Steve Chartrand (LW)	Canada	Toronto Maple Leafs	Drummondville Voliguers (QMJHL)
235	Evgeny Davydov (LW)	Soviet Union	Winnipeg Jets	CSKA Moscow (USSR)
236	Peter Larsson (C)	Sweden	New Jersey Devils	Sodertalje SK (Sweden)
237	Mike Doneghey (G)	United States	Chicago Blackhawks	Catholic Memorial School (USHS–MA)
238	Helmuts Balderis (RW)	Soviet Union	Minnesota North Stars	Dinamo Riga (USSR)
239	Darcy Cahill (C)	Canada	Vancouver Canucks	Cornwall Royals (OHL)
240	Sergei Kharin (LW)	Soviet Union	Winnipeg Jets (from St. Louis)^{1}	Krylya Sovetov (USSR)
241	Peter Kasowski (C)	Canada	Hartford Whalers	Swift Current Broncos (WHL)
242	Joe Frederick (RW)	United States	Detroit Red Wings	Madison Capitols (USHL)
243	James Pollio (LW)	United States	Philadelphia Flyers	Vermont Academy (USHS–VT)
244	Ken MacDermid (LW)	Canada	New York Rangers	Hull Olympiques (QMJHL)
245	Mike Bavis (RW)	United States	Buffalo Sabres	Cushing Academy (USHS–MA)
246	Jason Glickman (G)	United States	Detroit Red Wings (from Edmonton)^{2}	Hull Olympiques (QMJHL)
247	Jason Smart (C)	Canada	Pittsburgh Penguins	Saskatoon Blades (WHL)
248	Jan Bergman (D)	Sweden	Vancouver Canucks (from Boston)^{3}	Sodertalje SK (Sweden)
249	Kevin Sneddon (D)	Canada	Los Angeles Kings	Harvard University (ECAC)
250	Ken House (C)	Canada	Washington Capitals	Miami University (CCHA)
251	Steve Cadieux (C)	Canada	Montreal Canadiens	Shawinigan Cataractes (QMJHL)
252	Kenneth Kennholt (D)	Sweden	Calgary Flames	Djurgardens IF (Sweden)
^{Reference:}

1. St. Louis' twelfth-round pick went to Winnipeg as the result of a trade on September 29, 1988, that sent Peter Douris to St. Louis in exchange for Kent Carlson, St. Louis's fourth-round pick in the 1990 entry draft and this pick.
2. Edmonton's twelfth-round pick went to Detroit as the result of a trade on January 23, 1989, that sent Doug Halward to Edmonton in exchange for this pick.
3. Boston's twelfth-round pick went to Vancouver as the result of a trade on June 17, 1989, that sent Frank Caprice to Boston in exchange for this pick.

== Draftees based on nationality ==
Rank	Country	Amount
	North America	212
1	Canada	134
2	United States	77
	Europe	40
3	Soviet Union	18
4	Czechoslovakia	9
5	Sweden	9
6	Finland	3
7	West Germany	1

== See also ==
- 1989 NHL supplemental draft
- 1989–90 NHL season
- List of NHL players
