= Walt Poddubny =

Canadian ice hockey player (1960–2009)

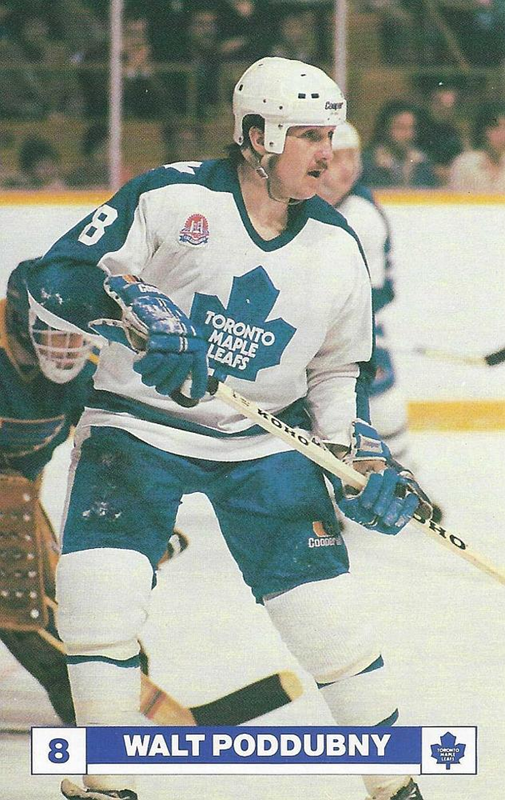
- Poddubny in 1985 postcard
- Born: February 14, 1960 Thunder Bay, Ontario, Canada
- Died: March 21, 2009 (aged 49) Thunder Bay, Ontario, Canada
- Height: 6 ft 1 in (185 cm)
- Weight: 210 lb (95 kg; 15 st 0 lb)
- Position: Left wing
- Shot: Left
- Played for: Edmonton Oilers; Toronto Maple Leafs; New York Rangers; Quebec Nordiques; New Jersey Devils
- NHL draft: 90th overall, 1980; Edmonton Oilers
- Playing career: 1980–1995

Walter Michael Poddubny (February 14, 1960 – March 21, 2009) was a Canadian professional ice hockey left winger and coach who played eleven seasons in the National Hockey League (NHL) from 1981–82 until 1991–92. He played 468 career NHL games, scoring 184 goals and 238 assists for 422 points.

== Career ==
Poddubny was drafted 90th overall by the Edmonton Oilers in the 1980 NHL entry draft. He spent most of the 1981–82 season with the Wichita Wind where he had 35 goals and 46 assists in 60 games. He was traded along with Phil Drouillard from the Oilers to the Toronto Maple Leafs for Laurie Boschman on March 8, 1982.

He was acquired by the New York Rangers from the Maple Leafs for Mike Allison on August 18, 1986, in a trade considered to be Phil Esposito's best during his three years as the team's general manager. Poddubny was the leading scorer in each of his only two Rangers campaigns, with 87 points (40 goals, 47 assists) in 1986–87 and 88 (38 goals, 50 assists) the following season. He was the recipient of the New York Rangers Fan Club's Frank Boucher Trophy for the most popular player on and off the ice in both years, and the team's Most Valuable Player Award from the Professional Hockey Writers Association in 1987.

Despite coming off a season as the Rangers' top scorer, he was traded along with Jari Grönstrand, Bruce Bell and a fourth-round selection in the 1989 NHL entry draft (76th overall–Éric Dubois) to the Quebec Nordiques for Normand Rochefort and Jason Lafreniere on August 1, 1988. Esposito felt the team needed to improve its defense after losing 17 games by one goal and missing the playoffs. He was also disappointed with Poddubny's failure to win face-offs, while head coach Michel Bergeron expressed displeasure with the quality of his checking game. Following a productive season in 1988–89 with the Nordiques that saw Poddubny score 38 goals in 72 games played, his playing career began to decline from damaged knees.

After his lone season with the Nordiques, Poddubny was sent to the New Jersey Devils for Claude Loiselle and Joe Cirella on June 17, 1989.

After his career in the NHL, Poddubny coached several hockey teams including six seasons as head coach of the Anchorage Aces. Life after the NHL wasn't easy for him, and he once said, "People think if you played in the NHL, you're set for life. It's not like that for everyone."

Poddubny died of a heart attack at the age of 49, after collapsing at his sister's house in Thunder Bay.

== Career statistics ==
=== Ice hockey ===
			Regular season					Playoffs
Season	Team	League	GP	G	A	Pts	PIM	GP	G	A	Pts	PIM
1978–79	Brandon Wheat Kings	WHL	20	11	11	22	12	—	—	—	—	—
1979–80	Kitchener Rangers	OMJHL	19	3	9	12	35	—	—	—	—	—
1979–80	Kingston Canadians	OMJHL	43	30	17	47	36	3	0	2	2	0
1980–81	Milwaukee Admirals	IHL	5	4	2	6	4	—	—	—	—	—
1980–81	Wichita Wind	CHL	70	21	29	50	207	11	1	6	7	26
1981–82	Wichita Wind	CHL	60	35	46	81	79	—	—	—	—	—
1981–82	Edmonton Oilers	NHL	4	0	0	0	0	—	—	—	—	—
1981–82	Toronto Maple Leafs	NHL	11	3	4	7	8	—	—	—	—	—
1982–83	Toronto Maple Leafs	NHL	72	28	31	59	71	4	3	1	4	0
1983–84	Toronto Maple Leafs	NHL	38	11	14	25	48	—	—	—	—	—
1984–85	St. Catharines Saints	AHL	8	5	7	12	10	—	—	—	—	—
1984–85	Toronto Maple Leafs	NHL	32	5	15	20	26	—	—	—	—	—
1985–86	St. Catharines Saints	AHL	37	28	27	55	52	—	—	—	—	—
1985–86	Toronto Maple Leafs	NHL	33	12	22	34	25	9	4	1	5	4
1986–87	New York Rangers	NHL	75	40	47	87	49	6	0	0	0	8
1987–88	New York Rangers	NHL	77	38	50	88	76	—	—	—	—	—
1988–89	Quebec Nordiques	NHL	72	38	37	75	107	—	—	—	—	—
1989–90	Utica Devils	AHL	2	1	2	3	0	—	—	—	—	—
1989–90	New Jersey Devils	NHL	33	4	10	14	28	—	—	—	—	—
1990–91	New Jersey Devils	NHL	14	4	6	10	10	—	—	—	—	—
1991–92	New Jersey Devils	NHL	7	1	2	3	6	—	—	—	—	—
1992–93	EC Bad Nauheim	DEU II	44	35	41	76	149	9	5	15	20	15
1993–94	HC Fassa	ITA	9	2	3	5	19	—	—	—	—	—
1993–94	EC Bad Nauheim	DEU III	37	40	46	86	115	—	—	—	—	—
1994–95	Worcester IceCats	AHL	34	7	6	13	62	—	—	—	—	—
NHL totals			468	184	238	422	454	19	7	2	9	12

=== Roller hockey ===
			Regular season					Playoffs
Season	Team	League	GP	G	A	Pts	PIM	GP	G	A	Pts	PIM
1994	Las Vegas Flash	RHI	19	21	26	47	32
1995	Orlando Rollergators	RHI	10	7	10	17	12
RHI totals			29	28	36	64	44

=== Coaching ===
Season	Team	League	Type	GP	W	L	T	OTL	Pct	Result
1994–95	Orlando Rollergators	RHI	Head Coach	23	7	16	0	0	0.304
1995–96	Daytona Beach Breakers	SHL	Head Coach	60	33	20	7	0	0.608	Lost in round 1
1996–97	Anchorage Aces	WCHL	Head Coach	64	41	18	0	5	0.68	Lost in finals
1997–98	Anchorage Aces	WCHL	Head Coach	64	36	20	0	8	0.625	Lost in round 2
1998–99	Anchorage Aces	WCHL	Head Coach	71	46	22	0	3	0.669	Lost in round 2
1999–00	Anchorage Aces	WCHL	Head Coach‡	56	30	21	0	5	0.58
2000–01	Anchorage Aces	WCHL	Head Coach	72	27	41	0	4	0.403
2001–02	Anchorage Aces	WCHL	Head Coach‡	40	9	26	0	5	0.287	Lost in round 1

‡ - Midseason Replacement
