= Justin Duberman =

American ice hockey player (born 1970)

- Born: March 23, 1970 (age 55) New Haven, Connecticut, U.S.
- Height: 6 ft 1 in (185 cm)
- Weight: 185 lb (84 kg; 13 st 3 lb)
- Position: Right wing
- Shot: Right
- Played for: Pittsburgh Penguins
- NHL draft: 230th overall, 1989; Montreal Canadiens
- Playing career: 1992–1998

Justin Craig Duberman (born March 23, 1970) is an American former professional ice hockey right winger.

Duberman was born in New Haven, Connecticut, but grew up in Highland Park, Illinois. As a youth, he played in the 1983 Quebec International Pee-Wee Hockey Tournament with a minor ice hockey team from Chicago.

He played in the National Hockey League for the Pittsburgh Penguins.

== Career statistics ==
			Regular Season					Playoffs
Season	Team	League	GP	G	A	Pts	PIM	GP	G	A	Pts	PIM
1988–89	University of North Dakota	WCHA	36	3	2	5	36	—	—	—	—	—
1989–90	University of North Dakota	WCHA	42	10	9	19	50	—	—	—	—	—
1990–91	University of North Dakota	WCHA	42	19	18	37	68	—	—	—	—	—
1991–92	University of North Dakota	WCHA	39	17	27	44	90	—	—	—	—	—
1992–93	Cleveland Lumberjacks	IHL	77	29	42	71	69	4	0	0	0	12
1993–94	Pittsburgh Penguins	NHL	4	0	0	0	0	—	—	—	—	—
1993–94	Cleveland Lumberjacks	IHL	59	9	13	22	63	—	—	—	—	—
1994–95	Johnstown Chiefs	ECHL	24	13	14	27	30	5	0	7	7	20
1994–95	Chicago Wolves	IHL	13	1	3	4	39	—	—	—	—	—
1994–95	JyP HT Jyvaskyla	SM-liiga	2	0	0	0	4	—	—	—	—	—
1995–96	South Carolina Stingrays	ECHL	47	24	24	48	119	—	—	—	—	—
1995–96	Cornwall Aces	AHL	1	0	0	0	0	—	—	—	—	—
1995–96	Portland Pirates	AHL	15	6	5	11	23	10	1	2	3	8
1996–97	Newcastle Cobras	BISL	30	20	18	38	106	—	—	—	—	—
1997–98	Newcastle Cobras	BISL	37	8	10	18	28	—	—	—	—	—
1995	Oakland Skates	RHI	21	21	19	40	43	—	—	—	—	—
1996	Oakland Skates	RHI	19	10	17	27	32	—	—	—	—	—
NHL totals			4	0	0	0	0	—	—	—	—	—

== See also ==
- List of select Jewish ice hockey players
