= Jason Lafreniere =

Canadian ice hockey player (1966–2026)

- Born: December 6, 1966 St. Catharines, Ontario, Canada
- Died: January 13, 2026 (aged 59) Vancouver, British Columbia, Canada
- Height: 5 ft 11 in (180 cm)
- Weight: 192 lb (87 kg; 13 st 10 lb)
- Position: Centre
- Shot: Right
- Played for: Quebec Nordiques; New York Rangers; Tampa Bay Lightning; Sheffield Steelers
- NHL draft: 36th overall, 1985; Quebec Nordiques
- Playing career: 1986–2005

Jason Lafrenière (December 6, 1966 – January 13, 2026) was a Canadian professional ice hockey player who played 146 games in the National Hockey League (NHL). He played with the Tampa Bay Lightning, New York Rangers, and Quebec Nordiques between 1986 and 1994.

== Biography ==
Born in St. Catharines, Ontario, Lafreniere was the son of the NHL hockey player, Roger Lafreniere.

Prior to turning professional, Lafreniere played major junior in the Ontario Hockey League, where he was named to the First All-Star Team in the 1985–86 season after recording 132 points in 62 games. He was traded along with Normand Rochefort from the Nordiques to the Rangers for Walt Poddubny, Jari Grönstrand, Bruce Bell and a fourth-round selection in the 1989 NHL entry draft (76th overall–Éric Dubois) on August 1, 1988.

Lafreniere died in Vancouver in January 2026, at the age of 59.

== Career statistics ==
=== Regular season and playoffs ===
			Regular season					Playoffs
Season	Team	League	GP	G	A	Pts	PIM	GP	G	A	Pts	PIM
1983–84	Brantford Alexanders	OHL	70	24	57	81	4	6	2	4	6	2
1984–85	Hamilton Steelhawks	OHL	59	26	69	95	10	17	12	16	28	0
1985–86	Hamilton Steelhawks	OHL	14	12	10	22	2	—	—	—	—	—
1985–86	Belleville Bulls	OHL	48	37	73	110	2	23	10	22	32	6
1986–87	Fredericton Express	AHL	11	3	11	14	0	—	—	—	—	—
1986–87	Quebec Nordiques	NHL	56	13	15	28	8	12	1	5	6	2
1987–88	Fredericton Express	AHL	32	12	19	31	38	—	—	—	—	—
1987–88	Quebec Nordiques	NHL	40	10	19	29	4	—	—	—	—	—
1988–89	Denver Rangers	IHL	24	10	19	29	17	—	—	—	—	—
1988–89	New York Rangers	NHL	38	8	16	24	6	3	0	0	0	17
1989–90	Flint Spirits	IHL	41	9	25	34	13	—	—	—	—	—
1989–90	Phoenix Roadrunners	IHL	14	4	9	13	0	—	—	—	—	—
1990–91	Canadian National Team	Intl	59	26	33	59	50	—	—	—	—	—
1991–92	Landshut EV	GER	23	7	22	29	16	—	—	—	—	—
1991–92	San Diego Gulls	IHL	5	1	2	3	2	—	—	—	—	—
1991–92	Canadian National Team	Intl	8	3	4	7	6	—	—	—	—	—
1992–93	Atlanta Knights	IHL	63	23	47	70	34	9	3	4	7	22
1992–93	Tampa Bay Lightning	NHL	11	3	3	6	4	—	—	—	—	—
1993–94	Tampa Bay Lightning	NHL	1	0	0	0	0	—	—	—	—	—
1993–94	Milwaukee Admirals	IHL	52	14	47	61	16	—	—	—	—	—
1994–95	Courmaosta HC	ITA	41	25	47	72	24	—	—	—	—	—
1995–96	Villach VSV	AUT	34	30	26	56	42	—	—	—	—	—
1996–97	Kalamazoo Wings	IHL	17	2	4	6	18	—	—	—	—	—
1996–97	Sheffield Steelers	BISL	22	11	18	29	18	—	—	—	—	—
1996–97	Olimpija Ljubljana	SLV	4	3	4	7	0	—	—	—	—	—
1997–98	Hannover Scorpions	DEL	49	15	45	60	62	—	—	—	—	—
1998–99	Hannover Scorpions	DEL	47	7	31	38	20	—	—	—	—	—
1999–00	Topeka ScareCrows	CHL	3	3	1	4	2	—	—	—	—	—
1999–00	Hamburg Crocodiles	DEL	8	1	5	6	4	—	—	—	—	—
1999–00	FC Barcelona	ESP	1	3	0	3	0	—	—	—	—	—
1999–00	Bakersfield Condors	WCHL	10	3	4	7	0	4	0	1	1	10
2000–01	HC Merano	ITA	24	5	18	23	8	—	—	—	—	—
2001–02	Edinburgh Capitals	BNL	44	38	50	88	32	6	3	2	5	6
2002–03	Guildford Flames	BNL	36	19	37	56	67	—	—	—	—	—
2003–04	Tilburg Trappers	NED	21	13	22	35	44	10	2	9	11	4
2004–05	Podhale Nowy Targ	POL	2	0	1	1	2	—	—	—	—	—
NHL totals			146	34	53	87	22	15	1	5	6	19
