= Roy Mitchell (ice hockey) =

Canadian ice hockey player

- Born: March 14, 1969 (age 56) Edmonton, Alberta, Canada
- Height: 6 ft 2 in (188 cm)
- Weight: 200 lb (91 kg; 14 st 4 lb)
- Position: Defence
- Shot: Right
- Played for: Minnesota North Stars
- NHL draft: 188th overall, 1989; Montreal Canadiens
- Playing career: 1989–2001

Roy Mitchell (born March 14, 1969) is a Canadian former professional ice hockey player who played three games in the National Hockey League for the Minnesota North Stars.

== Career statistics ==
			Regular season					Playoffs
Season	Team	League	GP	G	A	Pts	PIM	GP	G	A	Pts	PIM
1985–86	St. Albert Saints	AJHL	39	2	18	20	32	—	—	—	—	—
1986–87	Portland Winterhawks	WHL	68	7	32	39	103	20	0	3	3	23
1987–88	Portland Winterhawks	WHL	72	5	42	47	219	—	—	—	—	—
1988–89	Portland Winterhawks	WHL	72	9	34	43	177	19	1	8	9	38
1989–90	Sherbrooke Canadiens	AHL	77	5	12	17	98	12	0	2	2	31
1990–91	Fredericton Canadiens	AHL	71	2	15	17	137	9	0	1	1	11
1991–92	Kalamazoo Wings	IHL	69	3	26	29	102	11	1	4	5	18
1992–93	Minnesota North Stars	NHL	3	0	0	0	0	—	—	—	—	—
1992–93	Kalamazoo Wings	IHL	79	7	25	32	119	—	—	—	—	—
1993–94	Kalamazoo Wings	IHL	13	0	4	4	21	—	—	—	—	—
1993–94	Binghamton Rangers	AHL	11	1	3	4	18	—	—	—	—	—
1993–94	Albany River Rats	AHL	42	3	12	15	43	3	0	0	0	0
1994–95	Worcester IceCats	AHL	80	5	25	30	97	—	—	—	—	—
1995–96	Worcester IceCats	AHL	52	1	3	4	62	4	0	0	0	2
1996–97	Central Texas Stampede	WPHL	20	1	8	9	12	11	2	7	9	10
1997–98	Newcastle Cobras	BISL	41	3	13	16	32	6	0	0	0	0
1998–99	Nottingham Panthers	BISL	42	3	4	7	28	8	0	1	1	8
1993–94	Idaho Steelheads	WCHL	47	1	17	18	47	3	0	1	1	8
2000–01	Idaho Steelheads	WCHL	55	0	9	9	45	—	—	—	—	—
NHL totals			3	0	0	0	0	—	—	—	—	—
AHL totals			333	17	70	87	455	28	0	3	3	44
