= Bruce Bell =

Canadian ice hockey player (born 1965)

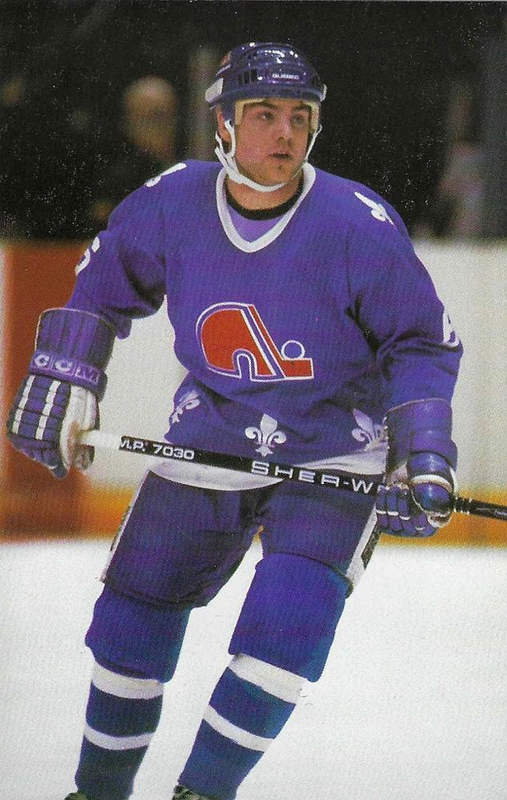
- Bell in 1984 photo
- Born: February 15, 1965 (age 61) Toronto, Ontario, Canada
- Height: 6 ft 0 in (183 cm)
- Weight: 180 lb (82 kg; 12 st 12 lb)
- Position: Defence
- Shot: Left
- Played for: Quebec Nordiques; St. Louis Blues; New York Rangers; Edmonton Oilers
- NHL draft: 52nd overall, 1983; Quebec Nordiques
- Playing career: 1984–1998

Bruce William Bell (born February 15, 1965) is a Canadian former professional ice hockey defenceman.

Bell started his National Hockey League (NHL) career with the Quebec Nordiques in 1984. He also played with the St. Louis Blues, New York Rangers and Edmonton Oilers. He was named to the NHL All-Rookie Team in 1985.

As a youth, he played in the 1978 Quebec International Pee-Wee Hockey Tournament with a minor ice hockey team from Toronto.

Bell returned to the Nordiques when he was traded along with Walt Poddubny, Jari Grönstrand and a fourth-round selection in the 1989 NHL entry draft (76th overall–Éric Dubois) from the Rangers for Normand Rochefort and Jason Lafreniere on August 1, 1988.

During the 1990–91 season, Bell was traded to the Minnesota North Stars in exchange for Kari Takko, making it the "Takko Bell Trade", as a play on the fast food restaurant chain. After retiring from hockey he turned to coaching and opened his hockey school.

== Career statistics ==
			Regular season					Playoffs
Season	Team	League	GP	G	A	Pts	PIM	GP	G	A	Pts	PIM
1981–82	Sault Ste. Marie Greyhounds	OHL	67	11	18	29	63	12	0	2	2	24
1982–83	Sault Ste. Marie Greyhounds	OHL	5	0	2	2	2	—	—	—	—	—
1982–83	Windsor Spitfires	OHL	61	10	35	45	39	3	0	4	4	0
1983–84	Brantford Alexanders	OHL	63	7	41	48	55	6	0	3	3	16
1984–85	Quebec Nordiques	NHL	75	6	31	37	44	16	2	2	4	21
1985–86	St. Louis Blues	NHL	75	2	18	20	43	14	0	2	2	13
1986–87	St. Louis Blues	NHL	45	3	13	16	18	4	1	1	2	7
1987–88	New York Rangers	NHL	13	1	2	3	8	—	—	—	—	—
1987–88	Colorado Rangers	IHL	65	11	34	45	107	4	2	3	5	0
1988–89	Halifax Citadels	AHL	12	0	6	6	0	—	—	—	—	—
1988–89	SC Rapperswil-Jona	CHE.2	14	4	7	11	18	—	—	—	—	—
1988–89	HC Bolzano	ITA	11	6	7	13	6	5	1	3	4	2
1988–89	Adirondack Red Wings	AHL	9	1	4	5	4	2	0	1	1	2
1989–90	Edmonton Oilers	NHL	1	0	0	0	0	—	—	—	—	—
1989–90	Cape Breton Oilers	AHL	52	8	26	34	64	6	3	4	7	2
1990–91	Cape Breton Oilers	AHL	14	2	5	7	7	—	—	—	—	—
1990–91	Kalamazoo Wings	IHL	48	5	21	26	32	3	0	0	0	8
1991–92	St. John's Maple Leafs	AHL	45	5	16	21	70	10	4	7	11	8
1992–93	Milwaukee Admirals	IHL	70	10	28	38	120	6	0	2	2	6
1993–94	Brantford Smoke	CoHL	51	10	38	48	22	—	—	—	—	—
1993–94	Binghamton Rangers	AHL	13	1	5	6	16	—	—	—	—	—
1994–95	Fort Worth Fire	CHL	48	12	50	62	77	—	—	—	—	—
1995–96	Durham Wasps	GBR	17	5	12	17	30	—	—	—	—	—
1995–96	Humberside Hawks	GBR	11	3	5	8	76	5	0	0	0	0
1996–97	Villacher SV	AL	42	5	30	35	76	—	—	—	—	—
1996–97	Villacher SV	AUT	6	1	4	5	36	—	—	—	—	—
1997–98	Phoenix Mustangs	WCHL	9	1	2	3	8	—	—	—	—	—
1997–98	Reno Rage	WCHL	24	4	11	15	14	—	—	—	—	—
1997–98	Houston Aeros	IHL	2	0	0	0	2	—	—	—	—	—
1997–98	Chicago Wolves	IHL	8	0	0	0	16	—	—	—	—	—
NHL totals			209	12	64	76	113	34	3	5	8	41
IHL totals			193	26	83	109	277	13	2	5	7	14
AHL totals			145	17	62	79	161	18	7	12	19	12
