= Sergei Kharin =

Russian ice hockey player (born 1963)

- Born: February 20, 1963 (age 62) Moscow, Russian SFSR, Soviet Union
- Height: 5 ft 10 in (178 cm)
- Weight: 180 lb (82 kg; 12 st 12 lb)
- Position: Right wing
- Shot: Left
- Played for: Krylya Sovetov Moscow; Winnipeg Jets; Cincinnati Cyclones
- NHL draft: 240th overall, 1989; Winnipeg Jets
- Playing career: 1980–2001

Sergei Anatolievich Kharin (Russian: Сергей Анатольевич Харин; born February 20, 1963) is a Russian former professional ice hockey player.

== Playing career ==
Kharin played 11 seasons in his native Russia for Krylya Sovetov (Soviet Wings) before being selected as a 26-year-old in the 12th round, 240th overall, of the NHL Entry Draft by the Winnipeg Jets. He played briefly in the National Hockey League for the Winnipeg Jets and Krylia Sovetov Moscow. He was the first Soviet-born player to play a regular-season game for the Jets. He also played on the Soviet Union's 1987 Canada Cup team, as well as for the Muskegon Fury in the United Hockey League.

Internationally, Kharin was a member of the Soviet national team. He appeared in two World Junior Championships and won a gold medal in 1983.

== Coaching career ==
On January 22, 2016, Kharin was named the Director of Hockey Operations for the Flint Firebirds of the Ontario Hockey League (OHL). Following the firing of former head coach John Gruden on February 17, 2016, Kharin was named the interim head coach of the Firebirds. The next day, OHL commissioner David Branch suspended the Firebirds' owner Rolf Nilsen and his appointees on the management and coaching staff, including Kharin, from hockey operations until further notice.

== Personal ==
Sergei's son Anton played for three years at Rochester Institute of Technology before joining the Muskegon Lumberjacks of the International Hockey League in 2009. Sergei, who played for the Muskegon team when it was known as the Fury, came out of retirement to play one more game on April 10, 2009, sharing a forward line with his son on the Lumberjacks. They became the first father and son to skate together in the IHL.

== Career statistics ==
=== Regular season and playoffs ===
			Regular season					Playoffs
Season	Team	League	GP	G	A	Pts	PIM	GP	G	A	Pts	PIM
1979–80	Krylya Sovetov Moscow	USSR	2	0	0	0	0	—	—	—	—	—
1980–81	Krylya Sovetov Moscow	USSR	—	—	—	—	—	—	—	—	—	—
1981–82	Kyrlya Sovetov Moscow	USSR	34	4	3	7	10	—	—	—	—	—
1982–83	Krylya Sovetov Moscow	USSR	49	5	5	10	20	—	—	—	—	—
1983–84	Krylya Sovetov Moscow	USSR	33	5	3	8	18	—	—	—	—	—
1984–85	Krylya Sovetov Moscow	USSR	34	12	8	20	6	—	—	—	—	—
1985–86	Krylya Sovetov Moscow	USSR	38	15	14	29	19	—	—	—	—	—
1986–87	Krylya Sovetov Moscow	USSR	40	16	11	27	14	—	—	—	—	—
1987–88	Krylya Sovetov Moscow	USSR	45	17	13	30	20	—	—	—	—	—
1988–89	Krylya Sovetov Moscow	USSR	44	15	9	24	14	—	—	—	—	—
1989–90	Krylya Sovetov Moscow	USSR	47	12	5	17	28	—	—	—	—	—
1990–91	Moncton Hawks	AHL	66	22	18	40	38	5	1	0	1	2
1990–91	Winnipeg Jets	NHL	7	2	3	5	2	—	—	—	—	—
1991–92	Halifax Citadels	AHL	40	10	12	22	15	—	—	—	—	—
1992–93	Birmingham Bulls	ECHL	2	0	3	3	0	—	—	—	—	—
1992–93	Cincinnati Cyclones	IHL	60	13	18	31	25	—	—	—	—	—
1993–94	Dayton Bombers	ECHL	59	30	59	89	56	3	2	0	2	4
1994–95	Cincinnati Cyclones	IHL	56	14	29	43	24	1	0	0	0	0
1995–96	Dayton Bombers	ECHL	25	7	9	16	25	—	—	—	—	—
1995–96	Worcester IceCats	AHL	28	7	12	19	10	3	1	1	2	2
1996–97	Port Huron Border Cats	CoHL	49	20	24	44	20	—	—	—	—	—
1996–97	Muskegon Fury	CoHL	19	12	16	28	12	3	0	2	2	0
1997–98	Muskegon Fury	UHL	74	36	86	122	38	11	4	15	19	0
1998–99	Muskegon Fury	UHL	70	37	63	100	77	18	7	17	24	10
1999–00	Muskegon Fury	UHL	59	11	50	61	13	—	—	—	—	—
2000–01	Muskegon Fury	UHL	66	8	30	38	46	4	1	0	1	0
NHL totals			7	2	3	5	2	—	—	—	—	—
USSR totals			366	101	71	172	149	51	18	5	14	13

=== International ===
Year	Team	Event	GP	G	A	Pts	PIM
1981	Soviet Union	EJC	5	6	6	12	2
1983	Soviet Union	WJC	7	8	2	10	2
Junior totals			12	14	8	22	4
