= John Tanner (ice hockey) =

Canadian ice hockey player

- Born: March 17, 1971 (age 54); Cambridge, Ontario, Canada
- Height: 6 ft 3 in (191 cm)
- Weight: 182 lb (83 kg; 13 st 0 lb)
- Position: Goaltender
- Caught: Left
- Played for: Quebec Nordiques
- NHL draft: 54th overall, 1989; Quebec Nordiques
- Playing career: 1990–1997

John P. Tanner (born March 17, 1971) is a Canadian former professional ice hockey goaltender who played 21 games in the National Hockey League with the Quebec Nordiques from 1989 to 1992. The rest of his career, which lasted from 1990 to 1997, was spent in the minor leagues.

== Career statistics ==
=== Regular season and playoffs ===
			Regular season									Playoffs
Season	Team	League	GP	W	L	T	MIN	GA	SO	GAA	SV%	GP	W	L	MIN	GA	SO	GAA	SV%
1986–87	New Hamburg Spirit 83's	NDJCHL	15	—	—	—	889	83	0	5.60	—	—	—	—	—	—	—	—	—
1987–88	Peterborough Petes	OHL	26	18	4	3	1532	88	0	3.45	—	2	1	0	98	3	0	1.84	—
1988–89	Peterborough Petes	OHL	34	22	10	0	1923	107	2	3.34	—	8	4	3	369	23	0	3.74	—
1988–89	Peterborough Petes	M-Cup	—	—	—	—	—	—	—	—	—	1	0	1	59	5	0	5.08	—
1989–90	Quebec Nordiques	NHL	1	0	1	0	60	3	0	3.03	.900	—	—	—	—	—	—	—	—
1989–90	Peterborough Petes	OHL	18	6	8	2	1037	70	0	4.05	.879	—	—	—	—	—	—	—	—
1989–90	London Knights	OHL	19	12	5	1	1097	53	1	2.90	.907	6	2	4	341	24	0	4.22	—
1990–91	Quebec Nordiques	NHL	6	1	3	1	229	16	0	4.21	.880	—	—	—	—	—	—	—	—
1990–91	London Knights	OHL	7	3	3	1	427	29	0	4.07	.865	—	—	—	—	—	—	—	—
1990–91	Sudbury Wolves	OHL	19	10	8	0	1043	60	0	3.45	.889	5	1	4	274	21	0	4.60	—
1991–92	Quebec Nordiques	NHL	14	1	7	4	797	46	1	3.47	.883	—	—	—	—	—	—	—	—
1991–92	New Haven Nighthawks	AHL	19	7	6	2	908	57	0	3.77	—	—	—	—	—	—	—	—	—
1991–92	Halifax Citadels	AHL	12	6	5	1	672	29	2	2.59	—	—	—	—	—	—	—	—	—
1992–93	Halifax Citadels	AHL	51	20	18	7	2852	199	0	4.19	.881	—	—	—	—	—	—	—	—
1993–94	Cornwall Aces	AHL	38	14	15	4	2035	123	1	3.63	—	—	—	—	—	—	—	—	—
1993–94	San Diego Gulls	IHL	13	5	3	2	629	37	0	3.53	.899	3	0	1	118	5	0	2.53	.917
1994–95	Greensboro Monarchs	ECHL	6	0	4	1	342	27	0	4.73	.833	—	—	—	—	—	—	—	—
1994–95	San Diego Gulls	IHL	8	1	3	1	344	28	0	4.87	.868	—	—	—	—	—	—	—	—
1995–96	Detroit Falcons	CoHL	2	1	0	0	112	8	0	4.27	.852	—	—	—	—	—	—	—	—
1995–96	Muskegon Fury	CoHL	2	0	2	0	89	8	0	5.38	.871	—	—	—	—	—	—	—	—
1995–96	Rochester Americans	AHL	10	3	6	1	579	38	0	3.94	.869	—	—	—	—	—	—	—	—
1996–97	Wheeling Nailers	ECHL	19	7	10	1	940	59	0	3.76	.889	—	—	—	—	—	—	—	—
NHL totals			21	2	11	5	1084	65	1	3.60	.883	—	—	—	—	—	—	—	—
