= Jason Miller (ice hockey) =

Canadian ice hockey player (born 1971)

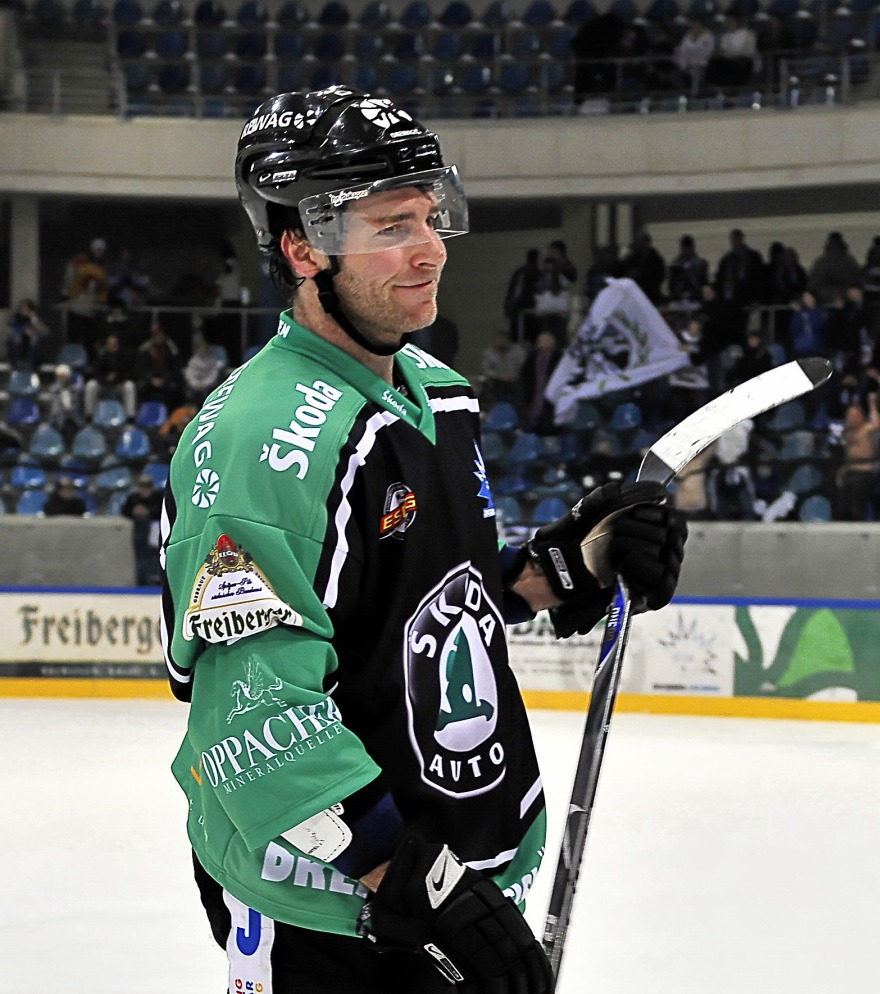
- Born: March 1, 1971 (age 55) Edmonton, Alberta, Canada
- Height: 6 ft 1 in (185 cm)
- Weight: 190 lb (86 kg; 13 st 8 lb)
- Position: Left wing
- Shot: Left
- Played for: New Jersey Devils; Kaufbeurer Adler; Düsseldorfer EG; Nürnberg Ice Tigers; Hamburg Freezers; HPK Hameenlinna
- NHL draft: 18th overall, 1989; New Jersey Devils
- Playing career: 1990–2010

Jason Miller (born March 1, 1971) is a Canadian former professional ice hockey left winger who played six games in the National Hockey League for the New Jersey Devils.

== Playing career ==
Born in Edmonton, Alberta, Miller was drafted 18th overall by the New Jersey Devils in the 1989 NHL entry draft.

Miller was also an indirect participant in one of the most important trades in NHL history. Almost a year prior to the 1989 NHL Entry Draft, the Edmonton Oilers traded "The Great One" Wayne Gretzky, along with Marty McSorley and Mike Krushelnyski, to the Los Angeles Kings for Jimmy Carson, Martin Gelinas, $15 million in cash, and the Kings' first-round draft picks in 1989, 1991, and 1993. The Oilers later traded their 1989 first-round draft pick to the New Jersey Devils who drafted Miller 18th-overall in the 1989 NHL Entry Draft.

He was assigned to the American Hockey League for the Utica Devils and then the Albany River Rats. In three seasons, Miller played just six NHL games for New Jersey and failed to register a point. After a season with the Adirondack Red Wings, Miller moved to Europe with a spell in Finland's SM-liiga with HPK and in Germany's Deutsche Eishockey Liga with Kaufbeurer Adler before returning to the United States in the International Hockey League with the Peoria Rivermen and the San Antonio Dragons.

In 1996, Miller returned to Germany, spending one season with Düsseldorfer EG before moving to the Nürnberg Ice Tigers where he spent four seasons. He spent one more season in the DEL with the Hamburg Freezers before dropping down to the 2nd Bundesliga and signing with the SERC Wild Wings. He then spent four seasons with Eisbären Regensburg before joining Dresdner Eislöwen in 2008. after Regensburg withdrew from the league due to financial difficulties. During his second season with Dresdner, with the team slumping and in need for injury replacements, Miller was released from his contract on January 25, 2010.

== Career statistics ==
			Regular season					Playoffs
Season	Team	League	GP	G	A	Pts	PIM	GP	G	A	Pts	PIM
1987–88	Medicine Hat Tigers	WHL	71	11	18	29	28	15	0	1	1	2
1988–89	Medicine Hat Tigers	WHL	72	51	55	106	44	3	1	2	3	2
1989–90	Medicine Hat Tigers	WHL	66	43	56	99	40	3	3	2	5	0
1990–91	Medicine Hat Tigers	WHL	66	60	76	136	31	12	9	10	19	8
1990–91	New Jersey Devils	NHL	1	0	0	0	0	—	—	—	—	—
1991–92	Utica Devils	AHL	71	23	32	55	31	4	1	3	4	0
1991–92	New Jersey Devils	NHL	3	0	0	0	0	—	—	—	—	—
1992–93	Utica Devils	AHL	72	28	42	70	43	5	4	4	8	2
1992–93	New Jersey Devils	NHL	2	0	0	0	0	—	—	—	—	—
1993–94	Albany River Rats	AHL	77	22	53	75	65	5	1	1	2	4
1994–95	Adirondack Red Wings	AHL	77	32	33	65	39	4	1	0	1	0
1995–96	HPK	SM-l	22	4	6	10	10	—	—	—	—	—
1995–96	Kaufbeurer Adler	DEL	3	1	1	2	0	—	—	—	—	—
1995–96	Peoria Rivermen	IHL	39	16	22	38	6	11	1	2	3	4
1996–97	San Antonio Dragons	IHL	76	26	43	69	43	9	1	4	5	6
1997–98	Düsseldorfer EG	DEL	49	16	21	37	26	3	1	2	3	0
1998–99	Nürnberg Ice Tigers	DEL	51	30	31	61	56	13	5	6	11	8
1999–2000	Nürnberg Ice Tigers	DEL	54	22	20	42	34	—	—	—	—	—
2000–01	Nürnberg Ice Tigers	DEL	56	21	36	57	44	2	0	2	2	2
2001–02	Nürnberg Ice Tigers	DEL	50	10	23	33	75	4	0	1	1	6
2002–03	Hamburg Freezers	DEL	47	5	5	10	14	2	0	0	0	0
2003–04	SERC Wild Wings	DEU.2	47	11	38	49	61	3	1	1	2	0
2004–05	Eisbären Regensburg	DEU.2	51	37	37	74	77	10	5	9	14	12
2005–06	Eisbären Regensburg	DEU.2	50	25	40	65	95	5	1	2	3	8
2006–07	Eisbären Regensburg	DEU.2	44	24	26	50	88	4	0	2	2	0
2007–08	Eisbären Regensburg	DEU.2	47	18	21	39	64	—	—	—	—	—
2008–09	Dresdner Eislöwen	DEU.2	29	17	12	29	10	—	—	—	—	—
2009–10	Dresdner Eislöwen	DEU.2	38	7	22	29	32	—	—	—	—	—
NHL totals			6	0	0	0	0	—	—	—	—	—
AHL totals			297	105	160	265	178	18	7	8	15	6
DEL totals			310	105	137	242	249	24	6	11	17	16

== Awards ==
- WHL East Second All-Star Team – 1991

Preceded by Bill Guerin	New Jersey Devils first-round draft pick 1989	Succeeded by Martin Brodeur
