= Jari Grönstrand =

Finnish ice hockey player

- Born: November 14, 1962 (age 63) Tampere, Finland
- Height: 6 ft 3 in (191 cm)
- Weight: 203 lb (92 kg; 14 st 7 lb)
- Position: Defense
- Shot: Left
- Played for: Tappara; Minnesota North Stars; New York Rangers; Quebec Nordiques; New York Islanders; ESG Füchse Sachsen; Chamonix HC; HC Reims
- National team: Finland
- NHL draft: 96th overall, 1986; Minnesota North Stars
- Playing career: 1982–1999

Jari Grönstrand (born November 14, 1962) is a Finnish former professional ice hockey player who played in the National Hockey League (NHL) between 1986 and 1991, and in the SM-liiga between 1982 and 1986, and again from 1991 to 1994. He played for Tappara, Minnesota North Stars, New York Rangers, New York Islanders, and Quebec Nordiques. Internationally he played for the Finnish national team at the 1986 World Championships and the 1987 Canada Cup. He was traded along with Walt Poddubny, Bruce Bell and a fourth-round selection in the 1989 NHL entry draft (76th overall–Éric Dubois) from the Rangers to the Nordiques for Normand Rochefort and Jason Lafreniere on August 1, 1988.

== Career statistics ==
=== Regular season and playoffs ===
			Regular season					Playoffs
Season	Team	League	GP	G	A	Pts	PIM	GP	G	A	Pts	PIM
1979–80	Tappara U20	Jr. A SM-sarja	1	0	0	0	2	—	—	—	—	—
1980–81	Tappara U20	Jr. A SM-sarja	32	5	12	17	20	—	—	—	—	—
1981–82	Tappara U20	Jr. A SM-sarja	24	5	9	14	22	—	—	—	—	—
1982–83	Tappara U20	Jr. A SM-sarja	11	1	2	3	18	2	1	0	1	2
1982–83	Tappara	SM-l	35	2	2	4	18	8	0	0	0	4
1983–84	Tappara	SM-l	32	2	4	6	14	9	0	2	2	4
1984–85	Tappara	SM-l	36	1	9	10	29	—	—	—	—	—
1985–86	Tappara	SM-l	36	9	5	14	26	8	1	2	3	4
1986–87	Minnesota North Stars	NHL	47	1	6	7	27	—	—	—	—	—
1987–88	New York Rangers	NHL	62	3	11	14	63	—	—	—	—	—
1988–89	Quebec Nordiques	NHL	25	1	3	4	14	—	—	—	—	—
1988–89	Halifax Citadels	AHL	8	0	1	1	6	—	—	—	—	—
1989–90	Quebec Nordiques	NHL	7	0	1	1	2	—	—	—	—	—
1989–90	Halifax Citadels	AHL	2	0	0	0	0	—	—	—	—	—
1989–90	New York Islanders	NHL	41	3	4	7	27	3	0	0	0	4
1989–90	Springfield Indians	AHL	1	0	1	1	0	—	—	—	—	—
1990–91	New York Islanders	NHL	3	0	1	1	2	—	—	—	—	—
1990–91	Capital District Islanders	AHL	63	13	22	35	40	—	—	—	—	—
1991–92	Tappara	SM-l	38	3	7	10	52	—	—	—	—	—
1992–93	Tappara	SM-l	46	5	5	10	76	—	—	—	—	—
1993–94	Tappara	SM-l	48	5	6	11	34	10	0	0	0	12
1994–95	ESG Füchse Sachsen	DEL	39	3	7	10	65	2	0	1	1	14
1995–96	Chamonix HC	FRA	27	5	13	18	38	9	6	5	11	10
1996–97	Hockey Club de Reims	FRA	27	4	8	12	30	3	0	0	0	0
1997–98	Hockey Club de Reims	FRa	40	7	22	29	42	—	—	—	—	—
1998–99	Hockey Club de Reims	FRA	46	7	12	19	94	—	—	—	—	—
NHL totals			185	8	26	34	135	3	0	0	0	4
SM-l totals			271	27	38	65	249	38	2	6	8	51

=== International ===
Year	Team	Event	GP	G	A	Pts	PIM
1986	Finland	WC	9	0	2	2	8
1987	Finland	CC	4	0	0	0	0
Senior totals			13	0	2	2	8
