= Rob Pearson =

Canadian ice hockey player (born 1971)

- Born: August 3, 1971 (age 55) Oshawa, Ontario, Canada
- Height: 6 ft 1 in (185 cm)
- Weight: 198 lb (90 kg; 14 st 2 lb)
- Position: Right wing
- Shot: Right
- Played for: Toronto Maple Leafs; Washington Capitals; St. Louis Blues
- NHL draft: 12th overall, 1989; Toronto Maple Leafs
- Playing career: 1990–2002

Robert Gordon Pearson (born August 3, 1971) is a Canadian former professional ice hockey right winger who played in the National Hockey League (NHL). He is now general manager and head coach of Pickering Panthers of the Ontario Junior Hockey League.

== Biography ==
Pearson was born in Oshawa, Ontario. As a youth, he played in the 1984 Quebec International Pee-Wee Hockey Tournament with a minor ice hockey team from Oshawa.

Pearson was drafted 12th overall by the Toronto Maple Leafs in the 1989 NHL entry draft. He played in 269 career NHL games, scoring 56 goals and 54 assists for 110 points. Pearson also played for the St. Louis Blues and the Washington Capitals.

On April 24, 2006, Pearson signed on as an assistant coach for the University of Ontario Institute of Technology Ridgebacks in Oshawa, Ontario, but later resigned from that position. In 2017, he was named the new head coach of Whitby Fury.

== Career statistics ==
			Regular season					Playoffs
Season	Team	League	GP	G	A	Pts	PIM	GP	G	A	Pts	PIM
1987–88	Oshawa Kiwanis AAA	Midget	72	68	65	133	188	—	—	—	—	—
1988–89	Belleville Bulls	OHL	26	8	12	20	51	—	—	—	—	—
1989–90	Belleville Bulls	OHL	58	48	40	88	174	11	5	5	10	26
1990–91	Belleville Bulls	OHL	10	6	3	9	27	—	—	—	—	—
1990–91	Oshawa Generals	OHL	41	57	52	109	76	16	16	17	33	39
1990–91	Newmarket Saints	AHL	3	0	0	0	29	—	—	—	—	—
1991–92	Toronto Maple Leafs	NHL	47	14	10	24	58	—	—	—	—	—
1991–92	St. John's Maple Leafs	AHL	27	15	14	29	107	13	5	4	9	40
1992–93	Toronto Maple Leafs	NHL	78	23	14	37	211	14	2	2	4	31
1993–94	Toronto Maple Leafs	NHL	67	12	18	30	189	14	1	0	1	32
1994–95	Washington Capitals	NHL	32	0	6	6	96	3	1	0	1	17
1995–96	Portland Pirates	AHL	44	18	24	42	143	—	—	—	—	—
1995–96	St. Louis Blues	NHL	27	6	4	10	54	2	0	0	0	14
1996–97	St. Louis Blues	NHL	18	1	2	3	37	—	—	—	—	—
1996–97	Worcester IceCats	AHL	46	11	16	27	199	5	3	0	3	16
1997–98	Cleveland Lumberjacks	IHL	46	17	14	31	118	10	6	4	10	43
1998–99	Cleveland Lumberjacks	IHL	20	3	10	13	27	—	—	—	—	—
1998–99	Orlando Solar Bears	IHL	11	6	2	8	41	17	8	6	14	24
1999–2000	Long Beach Ice Dogs	IHL	60	17	23	40	145	4	0	0	0	8
2001–02	Frankfurt Lions	DEL	33	5	16	21	125	—	—	—	—	—
AHL totals			120	44	54	98	478	18	8	4	12	56
NHL totals			269	56	54	110	645	33	4	2	6	94

Preceded by Scott Thornton	Toronto Maple Leafs first-round draft pick 1989	Succeeded by Steve Bancroft
