= Derek Frenette =

Canadian ice hockey player

- Born: July 13, 1971 (age 54) Dollard-des-Ormeaux, Quebec, Canada
- Height: 6 ft 1 in (185 cm)
- Weight: 185 lb (84 kg; 13 st 3 lb)
- Position: Left wing
- Shot: Left
- Played for: Peoria Rivermen (IHL); Detroit Falcons (CoHL)
- NHL draft: 124th overall, 1989; St. Louis Blues
- Playing career: 1991–1994

Derek Frenette (born July 13, 1971) is a Canadian former professional ice hockey left winger.

Frenette spent two seasons with Ferris State University of the Central Collegiate Hockey Association (CCHA) before playing one season with the Hull Olympiques of the QMJHL. Drafted in the sixth round, 124th overall in the 1989 NHL entry draft by the St. Louis Blues, Frenette spent parts of five professional ice hockey seasons with the Peoria Rivermen of the International Hockey League (IHL) and the Detroit Falcons of the Colonial Hockey League (CoHL).

== Career statistics ==
			Regular Season					Playoffs
Season	Team	League	GP	G	A	Pts	PIM	GP	G	A	Pts	PIM
1988–89	Ferris State University	CCHA	27	3	4	7	17	—	—	—	—	—
1989–90	Ferris State University	CCHA	29	1	4	5	48	—	—	—	—	—
1990–91	Hull Olympiques	QMJHL	66	27	42	69	72	6	4	3	7	12
1990–91	Peoria Rivermen	IHL	—	—	—	—	—	6	0	0	0	0
1991–92	Peoria Rivermen	IHL	46	2	11	13	51	10	0	3	3	4
1992–93	Peoria Rivermen	IHL	73	18	19	37	44	4	1	2	3	2
1993–94	Peoria Rivermen	IHL	55	5	7	12	35	3	1	2	3	6
1994–95	Detroit Falcons	CoHL	3	0	2	2	0	—	—	—	—	—
IHL totals			174	25	37	62	130	23	2	7	9	12
