= Normand Rochefort =

Canadian ice hockey player

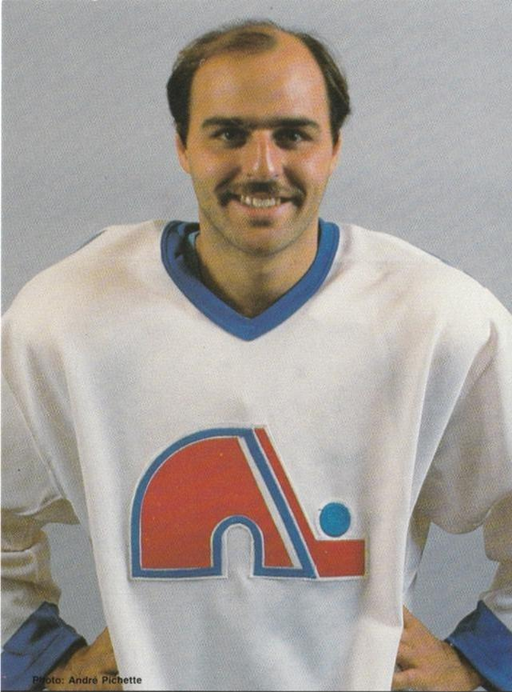
- Born: January 28, 1961 (age 65) Trois-Rivières, Quebec, Canada
- Height: 6 ft 1 in (185 cm)
- Weight: 215 lb (98 kg; 15 st 5 lb)
- Position: Defence
- Shot: Left
- Played for: Quebec Nordiques; New York Rangers; Tampa Bay Lightning
- National team: Canada
- NHL draft: 24th overall, 1980; Quebec Nordiques
- Playing career: 1980–2005

Normand Rochefort (born January 28, 1961) is a Canadian former professional ice hockey defenceman.

== Biography ==
Rochefort was born in Trois-Rivières, Quebec. As a youth, he played in the 1974 Quebec International Pee-Wee Hockey Tournament with a minor ice hockey team from Trois-Rivières. He played eight seasons with the Quebec Nordiques who had selected him 24th overall in the second round of the 1980 NHL entry draft. He was reunited with head coach Michel Bergeron after being traded along with Jason Lafreniere from the Nordiques to the New York Rangers for Walt Poddubny, Jari Grönstrand, Bruce Bell and a fourth-round selection in the 1989 NHL entry draft (76th overall–Éric Dubois) on August 1, 1988. Rochefort was the key player going to the Rangers which needed to improve its defense after losing 17 games by one goal and failing to qualify for the postseason.

He was a member of Team Canada in the 1987 Canada Cup. He finished out his NHL career with a short stint with the Tampa Bay Lightning in 1993. He then agreed to assist coaching the Acadie-Bathurst Titans. In 2002, he came out of retirement to play minor league hockey with his son Billy Rochefort.

== Awards and achievements ==
- QMJHL Rookie of the Year (Shared award with Denis Savard) (1978)
- Memorial Cup Tournament All-Star Team (1979)
- QMJHL Second All-Star Team (1980)

== Career statistics ==
=== Regular season and playoffs ===
			Regular season					Playoffs
Season	Team	League	GP	G	A	Pts	PIM	GP	G	A	Pts	PIM
1977–78	Trois-Rivières Draveurs	QMJHL	72	9	37	46	36	13	3	8	11	36
1977–78	Trois-Rivières Draveurs	MC	—	—	—	—	—	3	0	1	1	2
1978–79	Trois-Rivières Draveurs	QMJHL	72	17	57	74	30	13	3	11	14	17
1978–79	Trois-Rivières Draveurs	MC	—	—	—	—	—	4	0	2	2	6
1979–80	Trois-Rivières Draveurs	QMJHL	20	5	25	30	22	—	—	—	—	—
1979–80	Quebec Remparts	QMJHL	52	8	39	47	68	5	1	3	4	8
1980–81	Quebec Remparts	QMJHL	9	2	6	8	14	—	—	—	—	—
1980–81	Quebec Nordiques	NHL	56	3	7	10	51	5	0	0	0	4
1981–82	Quebec Nordiques	NHL	72	4	14	18	115	16	0	2	2	10
1982–83	Quebec Nordiques	NHL	62	6	17	23	40	1	0	0	0	2
1983–84	Quebec Nordiques	NHL	75	2	22	24	47	6	1	0	1	6
1984–85	Quebec Nordiques	NHL	73	3	21	24	74	18	2	1	3	8
1985–86	Quebec Nordiques	NHL	26	5	4	9	30	—	—	—	—	—
1986–87	Quebec Nordiques	NHL	70	6	9	15	46	13	2	1	3	26
1987–88	Quebec Nordiques	NHL	46	3	10	13	49	—	—	—	—	—
1988–89	New York Rangers	NHL	11	1	5	6	18	—	—	—	—	—
1989–90	New York Rangers	NHL	31	3	1	4	24	10	2	1	3	26
1989–90	Flint Spirits	IHL	7	3	2	5	4	—	—	—	—	—
1990–91	New York Rangers	NHL	44	3	7	10	35	—	—	—	—	—
1991–92	New York Rangers	NHL	26	0	2	2	31	—	—	—	—	—
1992–93	EHC Eisbären Berlin	1.GBun	17	4	2	6	21	—	—	—	—	—
1993–94	Tampa Bay Lightning	NHL	6	0	0	0	10	—	—	—	—	—
1993–94	Atlanta Knights	IHL	65	5	7	12	43	13	0	2	2	6
1994–95	Denver Grizzlies	IHL	77	4	13	17	46	17	1	4	5	12
1995–96	San Francisco Spiders	IHL	77	3	12	15	45	4	0	0	0	2
1996–97	Kansas City Blades	IHL	77	7	14	21	28	3	1	0	1	2
1997–98	Kansas City Blades	IHL	52	1	3	4	48	11	1	2	3	8
NHL totals			598	39	119	158	570	69	7	5	12	82
IHL totals			355	23	51	74	214	48	3	8	11	30

=== International ===
Year	Team	Event	GP	G	A	Pts	PIM
1987	NHL All-Stars	RV-87	1	0	0	0	0
1987	Canada	CC	9	1	2	3	8
Senior totals			10	1	2	3	8
