= Rick Judson =

American ice hockey player (born 1969)

- Born: August 13, 1969 (age 56) Toledo, Ohio, U.S.
- Height: 5 ft 10 in (178 cm)
- Weight: 198 lb (90 kg; 14 st 2 lb)
- Position: Left wing
- Shot: Left
- Played for: Toledo Storm; Adirondack Red Wings; Las Vegas Thunder; Utah Grizzlies; Michigan K-Wings; Minnesota Moose; Manchester Storm; Greenville Grrrowl; Port Huron Border Cats; Fort Wayne Komets
- NHL draft: 210th overall, 1989; Detroit Red Wings
- Playing career: 1991–2006

Rick Judson (born August 13, 1969) is an American former professional ice hockey player.

Judson played college hockey at the University of Illinois at Chicago, then went on to play for and additional fifteen seasons in the minor leagues before retiring as a professional player in 2006.

== Career statistics ==
| | | | Regular season | | | | | Playoffs |
| Season | Team | League | GP | G | A | Pts | PIM | GP | G | A | Pts | PIM |
|---|---|---|---|---|---|---|---|---|---|---|---|---|
| 1988–89 | University of Illinois at Chicago | NCAA | 42 | 14 | 20 | 34 | 20 | — | — | — | — | — |
| 1989–90 | University of Illinois at Chicago | NCAA | 38 | 19 | 22 | 41 | 18 | — | — | — | — | — |
| 1990–91 | University of Illinois at Chicago | NCAA | 38 | 24 | 26 | 50 | 12 | — | — | — | — | — |
| 1991–92 | University of Illinois at Chicago | NCAA | 36 | 17 | 19 | 36 | 26 | — | — | — | — | — |
| 1991–92 | Toledo Storm | ECHL | 2 | 1 | 0 | 1 | 2 | — | — | — | — | — |
| 1992–93 | Toledo Storm | ECHL | 56 | 23 | 28 | 51 | 39 | 16 | 7 | 16 | 23 | 10 |
| 1992–93 | Adirondack Red Wings | AHL | 7 | 3 | 0 | 3 | 0 | — | — | — | — | — |
| 1993–94 | Toledo Storm | ECHL | 61 | 39 | 49 | 88 | 16 | 14 | 5 | 13 | 18 | 6 |
| 1993–94 | Adirondack Red Wings | AHL | 2 | 1 | 0 | 1 | 0 | — | — | — | — | — |
| 1994–95 | Toledo Storm | ECHL | 54 | 27 | 41 | 68 | 29 | 4 | 2 | 4 | 6 | 0 |
| 1994–95 | Las Vegas Thunder | IHL | 2 | 0 | 1 | 1 | 0 | — | — | — | — | — |
| 1995–96 | Toledo Storm | ECHL | 59 | 43 | 38 | 81 | 38 | 11 | 9 | 9 | 18 | 2 |
| 1995–96 | Utah Grizzlies | IHL | 1 | 0 | 0 | 0 | 0 | — | — | — | — | — |
| 1995–96 | Michigan K-Wings | IHL | 2 | 0 | 1 | 1 | 0 | — | — | — | — | — |
| 1995–96 | Minnesota Moose | IHL | 5 | 0 | 1 | 1 | 0 | — | — | — | — | — |
| 1996–97 | Toledo Storm | ECHL | 54 | 30 | 43 | 73 | 22 | 5 | 3 | 2 | 5 | 0 |
| 1996–97 | Las Vegas Thunder | IHL | 17 | 5 | 2 | 7 | 0 | 2 | 0 | 0 | 0 | 0 |
| 1997–98 | Manchester Storm | BISL | 12 | 4 | 5 | 9 | 0 | — | — | — | — | — |
| 1997–98 | Toledo Storm | ECHL | 32 | 7 | 17 | 24 | 14 | 7 | 0 | 2 | 2 | 4 |
| 1998–99 | Greenville Grrrowl | ECHL | 70 | 16 | 32 | 48 | 22 | — | — | — | — | — |
| 1999–00 | Port Huron Border Cats | UHL | 67 | 32 | 30 | 62 | 18 | 6 | 2 | 4 | 6 | 2 |
| 2000–01 | Fort Wayne Komets | UHL | 53 | 16 | 28 | 44 | 8 | 6 | 0 | 4 | 4 | 2 |
| 2001–02 | Port Huron Border Cats | UHL | 53 | 20 | 12 | 32 | 20 | — | — | — | — | — |
| 2003–04 | Toledo Storm | ECHL | 70 | 11 | 16 | 27 | 22 | — | — | — | — | — |
| 2004–05 | Toledo Storm | ECHL | 64 | 16 | 12 | 28 | 26 | 4 | 0 | 0 | 0 | 0 |
| 2005–06 | Toledo Storm | ECHL | 3 | 0 | 0 | 0 | 2 | — | — | — | — | — |
| AHL totals | | | 9 | 4 | 0 | 4 | 0 | — | — | — | — | — |
| ECHL totals | | | 525 | 213 | 276 | 489 | 232 | 61 | 26 | 46 | 72 | 22 |
| IHL totals | | | 27 | 5 | 5 | 10 | 0 | 2 | 0 | 0 | 0 | 0 |
