= Bob Logan (ice hockey) =

Canadian ice hockey player

- Born: February 22, 1964 (age 62) Montreal, Quebec, Canada
- Height: 6 ft 0 in (183 cm)
- Weight: 190 lb (86 kg; 13 st 8 lb)
- Position: Left wing
- Shot: Left
- Played for: Buffalo Sabres; Los Angeles Kings; HC Ambri-Piotta
- NHL draft: 100th overall, 1982; Buffalo Sabres
- Playing career: 1986–1990

Robert Logan (born February 22, 1964) is a Canadian former professional ice hockey player.

== Career ==
Logan played 42 games in the National Hockey League, thirty-eight with the Sabres and four with the Los Angeles Kings between 1986 and 1988. He scored ten goals and added five assists in his NHL career. He was drafted in the fifth round, 100th overall, by the Buffalo Sabres in the 1982 NHL entry draft.

== Personal life ==
Logan has two daughters.

== Career statistics ==
=== Regular season and playoffs ===
			Regular season					Playoffs
Season	Team	League	GP	G	A	Pts	PIM	GP	G	A	Pts	PIM
1979–80	Lac St-Louis Lions	QMAAA	5	1	3	4	0	—	—	—	—	—
1980–81	Lac St-Louis Lions	QMAAA	42	32	34	66	42	6	4	6	10	4
1981–82	Montreal West Island	QJAHL	—	—	—	—	—	—	—	—	—	—
1982–83	Yale University	ECAC	26	13	12	25	6	—	—	—	—	—
1983–84	Yale University	ECAC	22	9	13	22	25	—	—	—	—	—
1984–85	Yale University	ECAC	32	19	12	31	18	—	—	—	—	—
1985–86	Yale University	ECAC	31	21	23	44	22	—	—	—	—	—
1986–87	Rochester Americans	AHL	56	30	14	44	27	18	5	10	15	4
1986–87	Buffalo Sabres	NHL	22	7	3	10	0	—	—	—	—	—
1987–88	Buffalo Sabres	NHL	16	3	2	5	0	—	—	—	—	—
1987–88	Rochester Americans	AHL	45	23	15	38	35	—	—	—	—	—
1988–89	New Haven Nighthawks	AHL	66	21	32	53	27	13	2	3	5	9
1988–89	Los Angeles Kings	NHL	4	0	0	0	0	—	—	—	—	—
1989–90	HC Ambri-Piotta	NLA	6	4	1	5	0	—	—	—	—	—
1989–90	New Haven Nighthawks	AHL	11	2	4	6	4	—	—	—	—	—
AHL totals			178	76	65	141	93	31	7	13	20	13
NHL totals			42	10	5	15	0	—	—	—	—	—

== Awards and honors ==
Award	Year
All-ECAC Hockey Second team	1985–86
