= Kent Carlson =

American ice hockey player (born 1962)

- Born: January 11, 1962 (age 63); Concord, New Hampshire, U.S.A.
- Height: 6 ft 3 in (191 cm)
- Weight: 210 lb (95 kg; 15 st 0 lb)
- Position: Defense
- Shot: Left
- Played for: Montreal Canadiens; St. Louis Blues; Washington Capitals
- NHL draft: 32nd overall, 1982; Montreal Canadiens
- Playing career: 1983–1989

Kent Berger Carlson (born January 11, 1962) is an American former ice hockey defenseman. Drafted in 1982 by the Montreal Canadiens, Carlson, also played for the St. Louis Blues, and Washington Capitals between 1983 and 1988. In 2005, Carlson participated in the Hockey Enforcers (hockey fighting) event that was shown on pay-per-view from Prince George, British Columbia, Canada.

== Career statistics ==
=== Regular season and playoffs ===
			Regular season					Playoffs
Season	Team	League	GP	G	A	Pts	PIM	GP	G	A	Pts	PIM
1976–77	Concord High School	HS-NH	—	—	—	—	—	—	—	—	—	—
1977–78	Concord High School	HS-NH	—	—	—	—	—	—	—	—	—	—
1978–79	Concord High School	HS-NH	—	—	—	—	—	—	—	—	—	—
1979–80	New Hampton School	HS-NH	—	—	—	—	—	—	—	—	—	—
1980–81	New Hampton School	HS-NH	—	—	—	—	—	—	—	—	—	—
1981–82	St. Lawrence University	ECAC	28	8	14	22	24	—	—	—	—	—
1982–83	St. Lawrence University	ECAC	36	10	23	33	56	—	—	—	—	—
1983–84	Montreal Canadiens	NHL	65	3	7	10	73	—	—	—	—	—
1984–85	Montreal Canadiens	NHL	18	1	1	2	33	—	—	—	—	—
1984–85	Sherbrooke Canadiens	AHL	13	1	4	5	7	2	1	1	2	0
1985–86	Sherbrooke Canadiens	AHL	35	11	15	26	79	—	—	—	—	—
1985–86	Montreal Canadiens	NHL	2	0	0	0	0	—	—	—	—	—
1985–86	St. Louis Blues	NHL	26	2	3	5	42	5	0	0	0	11
1987–88	Peoria Rivermen	IHL	52	5	16	21	88	—	—	—	—	—
1987–88	St. Louis Blues	NHL	—	—	—	—	—	3	0	0	0	2
1988–89	Washington Capitals	NHL	2	1	0	1	0	—	—	—	—	—
1988–89	Baltimore Skipjacks	AHL	28	2	8	10	69	—	—	—	—	—
NHL totals			113	7	11	18	148	8	0	0	0	13

== Awards and honors ==
Award	Year
All-ECAC Hockey Second Team	1982–83
