= Éric Dubois =

Former Canadian ice hockey player

- Dubois in 2026
- Born: May 10, 1970 (age 56) Moncton, New Brunswick, Canada
- Height: 6 ft 2 in (188 cm)
- Weight: 200 lb (91 kg; 14 st 4 lb)
- Position: Defence
- Shot: Right
- Played for: New Haven Nighthawks
- NHL draft: 76th overall, 1989; Quebec Nordiques
- Playing career: 1991–2003

Éric Dubois (born May 10, 1970) is a Canadian former professional ice hockey player who played over 500 career games in the American Hockey League (AHL), International Hockey League (IHL) and the Deutsche Eishockey Liga (DEL). He is currently the head coach of the Eisbären Berlin.

== Playing career ==
Dubois played his entire junior career with the Laval Titan of the Quebec Major Junior Hockey League (QMJHL) from 1986 to 1991, during which the Titan captured two league titles (1988–89 and 1990–91). Over five full seasons, he amassed 222 points in 321 regular season games and earned QMJHL First Team All-Star honours in 1988–89.

After being drafted by the Quebec Nordiques of the National Hockey League (NHL) in the fourth round of the 1989 Entry Draft, Dubois went on to play seven seasons in the minor leagues from 1991 to 1997, primarily with the IHL's Atlanta Knights, Chicago Wolves, and Manitoba Moose. This included a Turner Cup championship with the Knights in 1994. He also played another five seasons in Europe, including three in the DEL and two more in the British Ice Hockey Superleague. He retired from full-time professional hockey in 2002, but played one season for the semi-professional Sorel Royaux before retiring for good.

== Coaching career ==
After the end of his playing career, Dubois spent eleven seasons coaching in the QMJHL, including five full seasons as a head coach, with the Baie-Comeau Drakkar, Acadie-Bathurst Titan, and Rimouski Océanic. He was hired as an assistant coach by the Manitoba Moose, now the AHL affiliate of the NHL's Winnipeg Jets, prior to the 2016–17 season.

Since July 2026, he is head coach of the 11-time Deutsche Eishockey Liga champions Eisbären Berlin.

== Personal life ==
Dubois and his wife, Jill, currently make their home in Winnipeg, Manitoba. They have two children, one of whom is Washington Capitals player Pierre-Luc Dubois.

== Career statistics ==
=== Regular season and playoffs ===
			Regular season					Playoffs
Season	Team	League	GP	G	A	Pts	PIM	GP	G	A	Pts	PIM
1986–87	Laval Titan	QMJHL	61	1	17	18	29	14	0	4	4	6
1987–88	Laval Titan	QMJHL	69	8	32	40	132	14	1	7	8	12
1988–89	Laval Titan	QMJHL	68	15	44	59	126	17	1	11	12	55
1989–90	Laval Titan	QMJHL	66	9	36	45	153	13	3	8	11	29
1990–91	Laval Titan	QMJHL	57	15	45	60	122	13	3	5	8	29
1991–92	Greensboro Monarchs	ECHL	36	7	17	24	62	11	4	4	8	40
1991–92	New Haven Nighthawks	AHL	1	0	0	0	2	—	—	—	—	—
1991–92	Halifax Citadels	AHL	14	0	0	0	8	—	—	—	—	—
1992–93	Oklahoma City Blazers	CHL	25	5	20	25	70	—	—	—	—	—
1992–93	Atlanta Knights	IHL	43	3	9	12	44	9	0	0	0	10
1993–94	Atlanta Knights	IHL	80	13	26	39	174	14	0	7	7	48
1994–95	Atlanta Knights	IHL	56	3	25	28	56	5	0	3	3	24
1995–96	Atlanta Knights	IHL	20	1	5	6	40	—	—	—	—	—
1995–96	Chicago Wolves	IHL	45	2	8	10	110	—	—	—	—	—
1996–97	Manitoba Moose	IHL	80	8	17	25	60	—	—	—	—	—
1997–98	Revierlöwen Oberhausen	DEL	46	2	8	10	110	—	—	—	—	—
1998–99	Nottingham Panthers	BISL	41	1	15	16	28	—	—	—	—	—
1999–00	Newcastle Riverkings	BISL	35	5	8	13	42	8	0	4	4	2
2000–01	Schwenningen Wild Wings	DEL	60	4	20	24	52	—	—	—	—	—
2001–02	Schwenningen Wild Wings	DEL	59	2	13	15	119	—	—	—	—	—
2002–03	Sorel Royaux	QSPHL	50	7	28	35	48	4	0	2	2	22
AHL totals			15	0	0	0	10	—	—	—	—	—
IHL totals			324	30	90	120	413	28	0	10	10	82
DEL totals			165	8	41	49	281	—	—	—	—	—

== Awards and honours ==
Award	Year
QMJHL
First All-Star Team	1989

Award	Year
IHL
Turner Cup champion	1994
