= List of Quebec Nordiques head coaches =

The Quebec Nordiques were an ice hockey team who played in both the National Hockey League (NHL) and the World Hockey Association (WHA). This is a list of the head coaches they had during their existence. The franchise moved to Denver, Colorado, in 1995, and became the Colorado Avalanche.

Michel Bergeron coached the most games and won the most points all-time with the Nordiques, with 634 games and 616 points. Maurice Filion and Michel Bergeron were the only coaches to have three terms with the Nordiques. Marc Crawford was the only Nordiques coach to win the Jack Adams Award.

== Key ==
#	Number of coaches^{[a]}
GC	Games coached
W	Wins
L	Losses
T	Ties
Pts	Points
*	Spent entire NHL coaching career with the Nordiques

== WHA coaches ==
#	Name	Term	Regular season					Playoffs			Results
#	Name	Term	GC	W	L	T	Pts	GC	W	L	Results
1	Maurice Richard	1972	2	1	1	0	2	—	—	—	Resigned after 2 games
2	Maurice Filion	1972–1973	76	32	39	5	69	—	—	—	Missed playoffs
3	Jacques Plante	1973–1974	78	38	36	4	80	—	—	—	Missed playoffs
4	Jean-Guy Gendron	1974–1976	159	96	59	4	196	20	12	8	Lost 1975 Avco Cup Finals to Winnipeg
5	Marc Boileau	1976–1978	140	74	61	5	153	17	12	5	Avco World Trophy (1977); Fired midway through the 1977 season
–	Maurice Filion	1977–1978	21	13	7	1	27	11	5	6	Interim coach
6	Jacques Demers	1978–1979	80	41	34	5	87	4	0	4	Lost in First Round

== NHL coaches ==
#	Name	Term	Regular season					Playoffs			Awards won	Reference
#	Name	Term	GC	W	L	T	Pts	GC	W	L	Awards won	Reference
1	Jacques Demers	1979–1980	80	25	44	11	61	—	—	—		
2	Maurice Filion*^{[b]}	1980	6	1	3	2	4	—	—	—		
3	Michel Bergeron	1980–1987	554	253	222	79	585	68	31	37		
4	Andre Savard*	1987	24	10	13	1	21	—	—	—		
5	Ron Lapointe*	1987–1989	89	33	50	6	72	—	—	—		
6	Jean Perron	1989	47	16	26	5	37	—	—	—		
–	Michel Bergeron	1989–1990	80	12	61	7	31	—	—	—		
7	Dave Chambers*	1990–1991	98	19	64	15	53	—	—	—		
8	Pierre Page	1991–1994	230	98	103	30	225	6	2	4		
9	Marc Crawford	1994–1995	48	30	13	5	65	6	2	4	1995 Jack Adams Award winner	

== See also ==
- List of NHL head coaches
- Head Coaches of the Colorado Avalanche

== Notes ==
- ^{a} A running total of the number of coaches of the Nordiques. Thus any coach who has two or more separate terms as head coach is only counted once.
- ^{b} Maurice Filion started the season as Nordiques' coach but resigned six games into the 1980–81 season in favour of Michel Bergeron.
