= Pierre Pagé =

Canadian ice hockey player, coach and executive

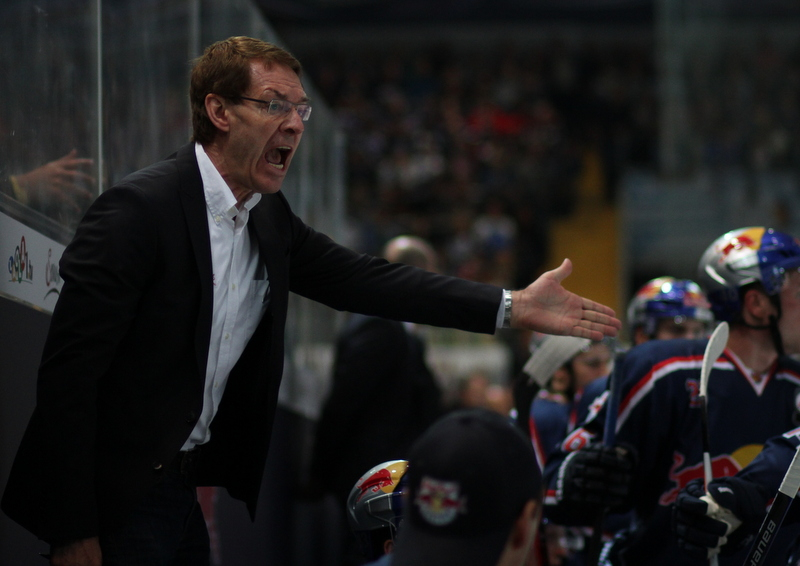
- Pagé in 2013
- Born: April 30, 1948 (age 78) St. Hermas, Quebec, Canada
- Position: Forward
- Coached for: Minnesota North Stars; Quebec Nordiques; Calgary Flames; Mighty Ducks of Anaheim; HC Ambrì-Piotta; Eisbären Berlin; EC Red Bull Salzburg; EHC Red Bull München
- Coaching career: 1972–2014

Pierre Pagé (pronounced [paʒe], sometimes erroneously spelled Pierre Page; born April 30, 1948) is a Canadian former ice hockey coach and executive. He only played briefly while attending college at St. Francis Xavier University in 1970-71, then turned to coaching.

== Coaching career ==
=== Calgary Flames (1980–1988) ===
Pagé started coaching at the age of 24 with Dalhousie University as an assistant coach. He became the head coach the following year, a position he held for seven years.

Page received his first job in the National Hockey League as an assistant coach with the Calgary Flames, working under head coach Al MacNeil. In 1980–81, his first season in the NHL and the Flames first in Calgary following their relocation from Atlanta in the summer of 1980, the club finished the season with a 39–27–14 record, earning 92 points and third place in the Patrick Division. In the postseason, the Flames swept the Chicago Black Hawks to win their first-ever playoff series in team history. Calgary then defeated the Philadelphia Flyers in seven games, however, they lost to the Minnesota North Stars in six games in the division semifinals.

The Flames struggled in the 1981–82 season, as their record fell to 29–34–17, earning 75 points. The club did finish in third place in the Smythe Division, qualifying for the postseason. In the first round, Calgary was swept by the Vancouver Canucks. Following the season, the Page was named as head coach of the Flames newly created CHL affiliate, the Colorado Flames.

In 1982–83, the Colorado Flames finished with the second best record in the six team league with a record of 41–36–3, earning 85 points. In the postseason, Colorado lost to the Birmingham South Stars in six games in the CHL semifinals.

Page remained with Colorado for the 1983–84 season, as the club finished with the best record in the league, going 48–25–3, earning 99 points. In the postseason, Colorado was upset by the Indianapolis Checkers in six games. Following the season, the CHL folded.

Page was named head coach of the Moncton Golden Flames of the American Hockey League for the 1984–85 season. The Golden Flames struggled to a 32–40–8 record, earning 72 points and finishing in last place in the North Division, failing to qualify for the postseason.

Page returned to the Calgary Flames as an assistant coach in 1985–86, working under head coach Bob Johnson. Calgary finished the regular season in second place in the Smythe Division, earning a record of 40–31–9 for 89 points. In the postseason, the Flames swept the Winnipeg Jets in the division semifinals. In the division finals, the Flames upset the two-time defending Stanley Cup champions, the Edmonton Oilers, in a thrilling seven game series. Calgary won another seven game series in the Campbell Conference finals, defeating the St. Louis Blues, earning a berth into the 1986 Stanley Cup Final against the Montreal Canadiens. The Flames lost the final round in five games.

Calgary had another excellent regular season in 1986–87, as the club improved to 95 points, earning a record of 46–31–3. In the playoffs, the Flames were upset by the Winnipeg Jets in the division semifinals, losing in six games.

The Flames took another step forward in 1987–88, as the team finished with the best record in the National Hockey League, winning the Presidents' Trophy with a record of 48–23–9, earning 105 points. Calgary quickly defeated the Los Angeles Kings in the division semifinals in five games, however, the team lost to the defending Stanley Cup champion Edmonton Oilers in four games in the division finals to end their season.

Following the season, Page left the Flames and was named head coach of the Minnesota North Stars.

=== Minnesota North Stars (1988–1990) ===
Pagé took over the Minnesota North Stars as head coach for the 1988–89 season, taking over the worst team in the National Hockey League, as the North Stars had a record of 19–48–13 in the 1987–88 season.

On October 6, 1988, Pagé coached his first career game, losing to the St. Louis Blues by a score of 8–3. After a 0–4–0 start to the season, Page won his first career game, defeating the Boston Bruins on October 15 by a score of 5–1.

Under Pagé, the North Stars saw an improvement of 18 points, as the team finished his first season with a 27–37–16 record, earning 70 points and third place in the Norris Division. In the postseason, Minnesota lost to the St. Louis Blues in five games in the division semifinals.

Minnesota saw some more improvement during the 1989–90, as the club improved by six points, registering a record of 36–40–4, earning 76 points. Despite the improvement, the North Stars dropped to fourth place in the Norris Division. In the playoffs, Minnesota nearly pulled off the upset against the top ranked Chicago Blackhawks in the division semifinals, however, the club lost in seven games.

Following the season, Pagé resigned as head coach of the North Stars to become the general manager of the Quebec Nordiques.

=== Quebec Nordiques (1990–1994) ===
The Quebec Nordiques hired Pagé as general manager of the club on May 5, 1990. The Nordiques were the worst team in the NHL during the 1989–90 season, as they had a record of 12–61–7, earning 31 points. One of Pagé's first decisions was to not bring back head coach Michel Bergeron. Pagé hired Dave Chambers, who had been one of his assistant coaches with the Minnesota North Stars, to be the Nordiques' head coach.

At the 1990 NHL entry draft, the Nordiques held the first overall selection, in which Pagé selected Owen Nolan from the Cornwall Royals of the Ontario Hockey League (OHL).

During the 1990–91 season, Pagé traded Michel Petit, Lucien DeBlois and Aaron Broten to the Toronto Maple Leafs in exchange for Scott Pearson and two second round draft picks, as the Nordiques continued their rebuild. Quebec finished the season with an improvement of 15 points from the previous season; however, Quebec's record of 16–50–14, earning 46 points, was still the worst in the league.

The Nordiques selected first overall at the 1991 NHL entry draft, as they picked Eric Lindros from the Oshawa Generals of the OHL. The Nordiques and Lindros could not come to a contract agreement, as Lindros opted to return to the Generals for the 1991–92 season.

Following a disappointing 3–14–1 start to the season, Pagé fired head coach Chambers and named himself as the replacement, while retaining his general manager duties. In his first game as head coach of the Nordiques on November 18, 1991, Quebec lost 7–3 to the Pittsburgh Penguins. In his second game as head coach, the Nordiques defeated the Montreal Canadiens 5–2 for his first career win as head coach of the Nordiques. As the club continued to rebuild, Page traded away Ron Tugnutt and Brad Zavisha to the Edmonton Oilers for Martin Ručinský and he traded Bryan Fogarty to the Pittsburgh Penguins for Scott Young at the trade deadline.

Quebec finished the 1991–92 season with a 20–48–12 record, earning 52 points, as the Nordiques once again failed to qualify for the playoffs. Pagé's head coaching record was 17–34–11 in 62 games.

On June 20, 1992, after not being to sign Eric Lindros, Page traded him to the Philadelphia Flyers for Steve Duchesne, Ron Hextall, Kerry Huffman, Mike Ricci, Chris Simon, the rights to Peter Forsberg, a first-round draft pick in both 1993 and 1994, and $15 million. The Nordiques had been negotiating with both the New York Rangers and the Flyers, and had separately come to an agreement with both teams, creating confusion as to which of the two offers was valid. The NHL had to appoint an arbitrator to rule between the two competing claims, and he came out in favor of the Flyers. Lindros became a superstar, as widely expected, in Philadelphia, but the bounty received by the Nordiques turned the team's on-ice fortunes completely around.

With many new players in the lineup, the Nordiques improved dramatically in the 1992–93, as Quebec finished with a record of 47–27–10, earning 104 points, and saw an NHL record 52 point improvement over the previous season. The Nordiques finished in second place in the Adams Division and qualified for the postseason. In their first round match-up against their provincial rivals, the Montreal Canadiens, Quebec took an early 2–0 series lead. The Canadiens stormed back and won the next four games, eliminating Quebec, and eventually going on to win the Stanley Cup.

The Nordiques had high expectations for the 1993–94 season. A holdout by Steve Duchesne, their top offensive defenseman the year before, and injuries to key players including Nolan plagued Quebec throughout the season, and the team struggled to a 34–42–8 record, earning 76 points, and missing the playoffs. Following the season, Pagé was fired by the team. Still, he had managed to put together the core of the team that would go on to win the Stanley Cup as the Colorado Avalanche two years later.

=== Calgary Flames (1995–1997) ===
Pagé returned to the Calgary Flames, as he was hired as head coach of the team on July 18, 1995.

In his first game as head coach of the team, the Flames tied the Tampa Bay Lightning 3–3 on October 7, 1995. Following a very disappointing 0–7–3 start to the 1995–96 season, Pagé finally won his first game with Calgary on October 31, as the Flames defeated the Los Angeles Kings 2–1. Calgary continued to struggle throughout November, as the team had a record of 3–15–5 through their first 23 games. Pagé and the Flames turned their season around, as Calgary was able to finish in second place in the Pacific Division with a 34–37–11 record, earning 79 points, and a berth into the postseason. In the postseason, the Flames were swept by the Chicago Blackhawks in four games.

In his second season with Calgary in 1996–97, Pagé and the Flames struggled to a 32–41–9 record, earning 73 points and fifth place in the Pacific Division as Calgary failed to qualify for the postseason. Following the season, Page resigned as head coach of the Flames.

=== Anaheim Mighty Ducks (1997–1998) ===
Pagé was hired as head coach of the Mighty Ducks of Anaheim for the 1997–98 season. In his first game as head coach, the Ducks lost to the Vancouver Canucks 3–2 in a neutral site game held in Tokyo, Japan on October 3. The next night, Pagé earned his first win, as Anaheim defeated Vancouver 3–2 in their second game held in Japan. The Mighty Ducks struggled during the season, finishing with a 26–43–13 record and sixth place in the Pacific Division, failing to qualify for the postseason.

On June 16, 1998, the Mighty Ducks fired Pagé as head coach.

=== Later career ===
After being dismissed by the Mighty Ducks, and out of hockey for one season, he continued his coaching career in Europe where he has coached in Switzerland (HC Ambrì-Piotta), Germany (Eisbären Berlin). In Berlin, he led the club to its first two championships.

He was the sporting director and head coach of EC Red Bull Salzburg in the Erste Bank Hockey League (EBEL) in Austria. With Pagé behind the bench, Red Bull won the championship in 2008 and 2010 and finished second in 2009 in a close series against EC KAC. 2010 was the most successful year in the history of the EC Red Bull Salzburg. The team won their international pre-season tournament (Red Bull Salute), the IIHF Continental Cup, and the Austrian championship. Pagé spearheaded the IIDM (International Ice Hockey Development Model) in Salzburg with Red Bull, which aimed to develop world class athletes with the help of the training facilities provided at the Thalgau training center.

== Career positions ==
- 1972–1973 – Dalhousie University (CIAU) – assistant coach
- 1973–1980 – Dalhousie University (CIAU) – Head coach
- 1980–1982 – Calgary Flames (NHL) – assistant coach
- 1982–1984 – Colorado Flames (CHL) – head coach
- 1984–1985 – Moncton Golden Flames (AHL) – head coach
- 1985–1988 – Calgary Flames (NHL) – assistant coach
- 1988–1990 – Minnesota North Stars (NHL) – head coach
- 1990–1994 – Quebec Nordiques (NHL) – general manager
- 1991–1994 – Quebec Nordiques (NHL) – head coach
- 1995–1997 – Calgary Flames (NHL) – head coach
- 1997–1998 – Mighty Ducks of Anaheim (NHL) – head coach
- 2000–2001 – HC Ambrì-Piotta (NLA) – head coach
- 2002–2007 – Eisbären Berlin (DEL) – head coach
- 2007–2013 – EC Red Bull Salzburg (EBEL) – head coach
- 2013–2014 – EHC Red Bull München (DEL) – head coach

== NHL coaching record ==
| Team | Year | Regular season | | | | | | Postseason | | | |
| Team | Year | G | W | L | T | Pts | Finish | W | L | Win% | Result |
|---|---|---|---|---|---|---|---|---|---|---|---|
| MNS | 1988–89 | 80 | 27 | 37 | 16 | 70 | 3rd in Norris | 1 | 4 | .200 | Lost in Division semifinals (STL) |
| MNS | 1989–90 | 80 | 36 | 40 | 4 | 76 | 4th in Norris | 3 | 4 | .429 | Lost in Division semifinals (CHI) |
| QUE | 1991–92 | 62 | 17 | 34 | 11 | 45 | 5th in Adams | — | — | — | Missed playoffs |
| QUE | 1992–93 | 84 | 47 | 27 | 10 | 104 | 2nd in Adams | 2 | 4 | .333 | Lost in Division semifinals (MTL) |
| QUE | 1993–94 | 84 | 34 | 42 | 8 | 76 | 5th in Northeast | — | — | — | Missed playoffs |
| CGY | 1995–96 | 82 | 34 | 37 | 11 | 79 | 2nd in Pacific | 0 | 4 | .000 | Lost in Conference quarterfinals (CHI) |
| CGY | 1996–97 | 82 | 32 | 41 | 9 | 73 | 5th in Pacific | — | — | — | Missed playoffs |
| MDA | 1997–98 | 82 | 26 | 43 | 13 | 65 | 6th in Pacific | — | — | — | Missed playoffs |
| QUE total | | 230 | 98 | 103 | 29 | 225 | | 2 | 4 | .333 | 1 playoff appearance |
| CGY total | | 164 | 66 | 78 | 20 | 152 | | 0 | 4 | .000 | 1 playoff appearance |
| MIN total | | 160 | 63 | 77 | 20 | 146 | | 4 | 8 | .333 | 2 playoff appearances |
| MDA total | | 82 | 26 | 43 | 13 | 65 | | — | — | — | 0 playoff appearances |
| NHL total | | 636 | 253 | 301 | 81 | 587 | | 6 | 16 | .273 | 4 playoff appearances |

| Preceded by Maurice Filion | General manager of the Quebec Nordiques; 1990–1994 | Succeeded by Pierre Lacroix |
| Preceded by Herb Brooks | Head coach of the Minnesota North Stars; 1988–1990 | Succeeded by Bob Gainey |
| Preceded by Dave Chambers | Head coach of the Quebec Nordiques; 1991–1994 | Succeeded by Marc Crawford |
| Preceded by Dave King | Head coach of the Calgary Flames; 1995–1997 | Succeeded by Brian Sutter |
| Preceded by Ron Wilson | Head coach of the Anaheim Ducks; 1997–1998 | Succeeded by Craig Hartsburg |
