= Maurice Filion =

Canadian ice hockey coach

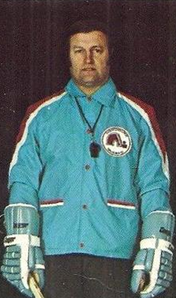
- Filion in 1972 card
- Born: February 12, 1932; Montreal, Quebec, Canada
- Died: July 28, 2017 (aged 85)
- Occupation: Former general manager of the Quebec Nordiques

Maurice Filion (February 12, 1932 – July 28, 2017) was a Canadian ice hockey coach and general manager. He served as general manager for the Quebec Nordiques throughout most of their time in the World Hockey Association (WHA), and briefly served as coach on three occasions. His tenure as general manager ended in 1988 when he was promoted to an executive role and was replaced by Martin Madden, but he served as interim general manager for a few months in 1990 when Madden was fired.

== Career ==
Filion spent two successful seasons at the helm of the Quebec Remparts of the QMJHL. During his rookie campaign, he won the Memorial Cup with a team led by numerous future NHL stars, including Guy Lafleur. His squad earned another Memorial Cup appearance the following season but lost in the finals.

Filion was hired by the Quebec Nordiques during their inaugural season in 1972-73. He was initially slated to serve as director of scouting, but after legendary former NHL star and initial Quebec head coach Maurice Richard resigned due to health problems, Fillion took over as head coach. The interim tag was removed after a successful 5-2 start to his WHA career. After the season, Filion moved to a role as the team's general manager.

Filion served as the team's GM until 1988, when he was replaced by Martin Madden; Filion then moved to the role of vice president of hockey operations, but he returned as GM in an interim capacity in 1990. He also served as head coach during the 1977-78 WHA season and 1980–81 NHL season. Six games into the 1980–81 season, with the Nordiques having won one game, lost three and tied two, Filion resigned as coach and gave the position to his newly hired assistant coach, Michel Bergeron.

== Coaching record ==
=== Professional hockey ===
Team	Year	Regular Season							Post Season
Team	Year	G	W	L	T	OTL	Pts	Finish	Result
Quebec Nordiques	1972–73	76	32	39	5	—	69	5th in East	Missed playoffs
Quebec Nordiques	1977–78	21	13	7	1	—	(83)	4th in WHA	Won in quarter-finals (4-2 vs. HOU); Lost in semi-finals (1-4 vs. NE)
Quebec Nordiques	1980–81	6	1	3	2	—	(78)	4th in Adams	Missed playoffs
NHL Totals		6	1	3	2	—	4		0 Stanley Cups (0-0, 0.000)
WHA Totals		97	45	46	6	—	96		0 Avco Cups (5-6, 0.455)

=== Junior hockey ===
Team	Year	Regular Season							Post Season
Team	Year	G	W	L	T	OTL	Pts	Finish	Result
Quebec Remparts	1970–71	62	54	7	1	—	109	1st in QMJHL	Won in quarter-finals (9-1 vs. VER); Won in semi-finals (8-0 vs. TR); Won President's Cup (8-2 vs. SHA); Won in Memorial Cup semi-finals (3-2 vs. STC); Won Memorial Cup (2-0 vs. EDM)
Quebec Remparts	1971–72	62	39	21	2	—	80	3rd in QMJHL	Won in quarter-finals (8-0 vs. SHE); Won in semi-finals (8-0 vs. DRU); Lost President's Cup finals (5-8 vs. COR)
QMJHL Totals		124	93	28	3	—	189	1 Jean Rougeau Trophy	1 President's Cup (22-5-2, 0.793) 1 Memorial Cup (5-2, 0.714)

Preceded by Jacques Plante; Martin Madden	General Manager of the Quebec Nordiques; 1974–88; 1990	Succeeded by Martin Madden; Pierre Page
Preceded by Maurice Richard; Marc Boileau; Jacques Demers	Head coach of the Quebec Nordiques; 1972–73; 1978; 1980–81	Succeeded by Jacques Plante; Jacques Demers; Michel Bergeron
