= John Purves (ice hockey) =

Canadian ice hockey player

- Born: February 12, 1968 (age 58) Toronto, Ontario, Canada
- Height: 6 ft 1 in (185 cm)
- Weight: 209 lb (95 kg; 14 st 13 lb)
- Position: Right wing
- Shot: Right
- Played for: Washington Capitals; ESV Kaufbeuren; Nottingham Panthers
- NHL draft: 103rd overall, 1986; Washington Capitals
- Playing career: 1983–2003

John Purves (born February 12, 1968) is a Canadian former professional ice hockey player. He played seven games in the National Hockey League for the Washington Capitals during the 1990–91 season. The rest of his career, which lasted from 1989 to 2003, was mainly spent in the minor leagues.

== Early life ==
Born in Toronto, Ontario, Purves played junior hockey in the Ontario Hockey League before joining the Capitals organization in 1989.

== Career ==
Purves was selected by the Capitals, 103rd overall, in the 1986 NHL entry draft. He mostly played in the American Hockey League for the Baltimore Skipjacks but managed to play seven regular season games for Washington during the 1990–91 season, scoring one goal.

After playing in the Eishockey-Bundesliga in Germany for ESV Kaufbeuren, Purves spent the next eight seasons in the International Hockey League, remaining in the league until its closure in 2001. He played for the Fort Wayne Komets, San Francisco Spiders, Kansas City Blades, San Antonio Dragons and the Utah Grizzlies.

After the IHL's demise, Purves followed Utah to the AHL who were one of six IHL teams to join the league for the 2001–02 AHL season. In 2002, he moved to the United Kingdom and signed for the Nottingham Panthers of the Ice Hockey Superleague in his final season before retiring.

== Career statistics ==
=== Regular season and playoffs ===
			Regular season					Playoffs
Season	Team	League	GP	G	A	Pts	PIM	GP	G	A	Pts	PIM
1983–84	North York Rangers	OJHL	40	24	35	59	58	—	—	—	—	—
1984–85	Belleville Bulls	OHL	55	15	14	29	39	12	0	3	3	2
1985–86	Belleville Bulls	OHL	16	3	9	12	6	—	—	—	—	—
1985–86	Hamilton Steelhawks	OHL	36	13	28	41	36	—	—	—	—	—
1986–87	Hamilton Steelhawks	OHL	28	12	11	23	37	9	2	0	2	12
1987–88	Hamilton Steelhawks	OHL	64	39	44	83	65	14	7	18	25	4
1988–89	Niagara Falls Thunder	OHL	5	5	11	16	2	—	—	—	—	—
1988–89	North Bay Centennials	OHL	42	34	52	86	38	12	14	12	26	16
1989–90	Baltimore Skipjacks	AHL	75	29	35	64	12	9	5	7	12	4
1990–91	Baltimore Skipjacks	AHL	53	22	29	51	27	6	2	3	5	0
1990–91	Washington Capitals	NHL	7	1	0	1	0	—	—	—	—	—
1991–92	Baltimore Skipjacks	AHL	78	43	46	89	47	—	—	—	—	—
1992–93	ESV Kaufbeuren	GER	43	15	17	32	34	—	—	—	—	—
1993–94	Fort Wayne Komets	IHL	69	38	48	86	29	18	10	14	24	12
1994–95	Fort Wayne Komets	IHL	60	30	33	63	16	4	4	1	5	6
1995–96	San Francisco Spiders	IHL	75	56	49	105	32	4	0	3	3	0
1996–97	Kansas City Blades	IHL	66	25	47	72	17	3	0	0	0	0
1997–98	Kansas City Blades	IHL	21	6	10	16	9	—	—	—	—	—
1997–98	San Antonio Dragons	IHL	59	22	21	43	12	—	—	—	—	—
1998–99	Utah Grizzlies	IHL	80	24	39	63	24	—	—	—	—	—
1999–00	Utah Grizzlies	IHL	78	36	27	63	40	5	1	0	1	2
2000–01	Utah Grizzlies	IHL	78	22	36	58	32	—	—	—	—	—
2001–02	Utah Grizzlies	AHL	57	14	18	32	28	5	2	0	2	0
2002–03	Nottingham Panthers	BISL	27	9	11	20	82	17	8	5	13	6
IHL totals			586	259	310	569	211	34	15	18	33	20
NHL totals			7	1	0	1	0	—	—	—	—	—
