= André Savard =

Canadian ice hockey player (born 1953)

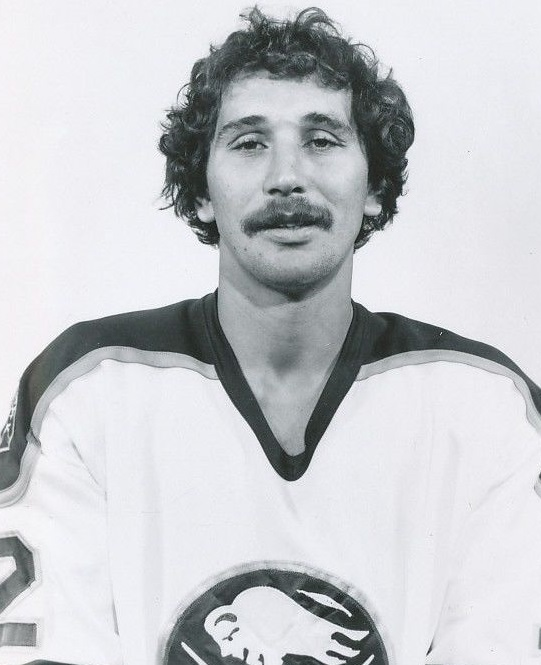
- Savard in 1980
- Born: February 9, 1953 (age 73) Témiscaming, Quebec, Canada
- Height: 6 ft 1 in (185 cm)
- Weight: 185 lb (84 kg; 13 st 3 lb)
- Position: Centre
- Shot: Left
- Played for: Boston Bruins; Buffalo Sabres; Quebec Nordiques
- NHL draft: 6th overall, 1973; Boston Bruins
- WHA draft: 3rd overall, 1973; Quebec Nordiques
- Playing career: 1973–1985

Joseph André Denis Savard (born February 9, 1953) is a Canadian former professional ice hockey center. He featured in the 1974 Stanley Cup Finals with the Boston Bruins.

== Playing career ==
Savard played 790 National Hockey League (NHL) games for Boston Bruins, Buffalo Sabres and Quebec Nordiques. He was drafted sixth overall in the 1973 NHL Amateur Draft by the Boston Bruins. He tallied 482 points (211 goals, 271 assists) during his career.

He served as head coach of the Quebec Nordiques. Savard was also a scout for the Ottawa Senators from 1994–1999 before being named an assistant coach for Ottawa. He was the general manager of the Montreal Canadiens from November 20, 2000, until the end of the 2002–2003 regular season when he stepped aside to allow Bob Gainey to become general manager. He then spent the following three years as Montreal's assistant GM. He was hired as an assistant coach for the Pittsburgh Penguins on July 3, 2006, working under head coach Michel Therrien, whom he had fired while GM of Montreal.

== Career statistics ==
			Regular season					Playoffs
Season	Team	League	GP	G	A	Pts	PIM	GP	G	A	Pts	PIM
1969–70	Quebec Remparts	QMJHL	53	23	60	83	126	14	9	13	22	30
1969–70	Quebec Remparts	M-Cup	—	—	—	—	—	12	8	9	17	37
1970–71	Quebec Remparts	QMJHL	61	50	89	139	150	14	9	17	26	56
1970–71	Quebec Remparts	M-Cup	—	—	—	—	—	6	2	7	9	9
1971–72	Quebec Remparts	QMJHL	33	32	46	78	103	—	—	—	—	—
1972–73	Quebec Remparts	QMJHL	56	67	84	151	147	15	18	24	42	33
1972–73	Quebec Remparts	M-Cup	—	—	—	—	—	3	2	3	5	18
1973–74	Boston Bruins	NHL	72	16	14	30	39	16	3	2	5	24
1974–75	Boston Bruins	NHL	77	19	25	44	45	3	1	1	2	2
1975–76	Boston Bruins	NHL	79	17	23	40	60	12	1	4	5	9
1976–77	Buffalo Sabres	NHL	80	25	35	60	30	6	0	1	1	2
1977–78	Buffalo Sabres	NHL	80	19	20	39	40	6	0	0	0	4
1978–79	Buffalo Sabres	NHL	65	18	22	40	20	3	0	2	2	2
1979–80	Buffalo Sabres	NHL	33	3	10	13	16	8	1	1	2	2
1979–80	Rochester Americans	AHL	25	11	17	28	4	—	—	—	—	—
1980–81	Buffalo Sabres	NHL	79	31	43	74	63	8	4	2	6	17
1981–82	Buffalo Sabres	NHL	62	18	20	38	24	4	0	1	1	5
1982–83	Buffalo Sabres	NHL	68	16	25	41	28	10	0	4	4	8
1983–84	Quebec Nordiques	NHL	60	20	24	44	38	9	3	0	3	2
1984–85	Quebec Nordiques	NHL	35	9	10	19	8	—	—	—	—	—
NHL totals			790	211	271	482	411	85	13	18	31	77

== NHL Coaching statistics ==
Team	Year	Regular season						Postseason
Team	Year	G	W	L	T	Pts	Finish	Result
Quebec Nordiques	1987-88	24	10	13	1	21	5th in Adams	(Fired)

== Personal ==
Savard and his wife, Marie-France, have two sons, Patrick and Dany.

Preceded by None	Quebec Nordiques first-round draft pick 1973	Succeeded by Real Cloutier
Preceded by Mike Bloom	Boston Bruins first-round draft pick 1973	Succeeded by Don Larway
Preceded by Michel Bergeron	Head coach of the Quebec Nordiques; 1987	Succeeded by Ron Lapointe
Preceded by Rejean Houle	General Manager of the Montreal Canadiens; 2000–03	Succeeded by Bob Gainey
