= San Francisco Spiders =

- City: Daly City, California
- League: IHL
- Division: South
- Founded: 1995
- Operated: 1995–96
- Home arena: Cow Palace
- Colors: Black, red, and silver
- Owner: Dave Pasant
- General manager: Jean Perron
- Head coach: Jean Perron
- Media: SportsChannel Bay Area
- Affiliates: Richmond Renegades (ECHL)

Franchise history
- 1995–1996: San Francisco Spiders

The San Francisco Spiders were a professional ice hockey team based in Daly City, California. They were members of the South Division of the former International Hockey League (IHL). Playing at the Cow Palace, the Spiders competed for one season, folding at the close of the 1995–96 IHL season.

== History ==
On November 22, 1994, the IHL announced an expansion franchise had been awarded to the Bay Area to begin play for the 1995–96 season at the Cow Palace. The former president and chief executive officer of the Jackson National Life Insurance Company Dave Pasant was the owner and paid the $6 million franchise fee to the IHL in becoming the league's 18th team. The Spiders nickname and logo were unveiled on December 15. Spiders was selected over Seals, Quakes, Fog and Rush and at the time of its establishment was the lone professional sports team with the Spiders nickname. Jean Perron served as both the general manager and head coach and was assisted by Bruce Boudreau, until the latter was fired three games into the season due to a power struggle with Perron (Boudreau would later become a head coach in the NHL with the Washington Capitals, Anaheim Ducks, Minnesota Wild and Vancouver Canucks). The inaugural game was a 5–1 loss to the Los Angeles Ice Dogs before 11,415 fans on September 29, 1995.

For the one season, the Spiders roster took on a familiar look to the Cow Palace's previous hockey tenant, the San Jose Sharks. Dale Craigwell, Link Gaetz, Robin Bawa, David Maley, Ed Courtenay and Mike Lalor all played for the IHL expansion team. The most notable NHL player who played briefly for the Spiders was Sandis Ozolinsh. Ozolinsh, who was holding out for a new contract from the Sharks, played two games with the Spiders. He scored one goal, the first goal in team history, shortly before the NHL's San Jose Sharks traded him to the Colorado Avalanche.

The team finished in third place in the South division, winning 40 games and losing 32. The Spiders lost 3–1 in the first round of the playoffs to the Chicago Wolves. Goalie Stephane Beauregard won the James Gatschene Memorial Trophy as league MVP for the season. John Purves led the team in scoring with 105 points.

The Spiders' mascot, Spinner, was widely known as "the hardest working mascot in sports." Spinner was often lowered from the arena rafters by a rope, once being unable to free himself and covering by dancing in place until arena staff freed him.

Poor attendance and difficulties with the arena caused the team to suspend operations. On weekends, attendance tended to be respectable, around the 7–8,000 mark, but on weekdays, the Spiders often struggled to draw more than 2,500 in averaging 5,024 fans for each home game. The team filed for Chapter 11 bankruptcy in May 1996 in citing losses of $6 million for the season, and would officially cease operations on June 24, 1996. Most of the players were traded away to other IHL teams for "future considerations." The Kansas City Blades received eight players from the Spiders. Pasant tried from 1996 to 1999 to move the team to Victoria, British Columbia, onto a proposed 12,500 seat arena to be built on public land, but that never went through due to concerns about the financial viability of the proposal. In 2000 the team was scheduled to move to Victoria, but this move never happened due to failure to replace the aging Victoria Memorial Arena. The IHL itself folded in 2001.

== Season-by-season results ==
Last five seasons: Note: GP = Games played, W = Wins, L = Losses, T = Ties, OTL = Overtime Losses, Pts = Points, GF = Goals for, GA = Goals against, PIM = Penalties in minutes

| Season | GP | W | L | OTL | Pts | GF | GA | PIM | Finish | Playoffs |
|---|---|---|---|---|---|---|---|---|---|---|
| 1995–96 | 82 | 40 | 32 | 10 | 90 | 278 | 283 | 1,835 | 3rd, South | Lost in Round 1, 1–3 (Wolves) |
