= Quebec Nordiques =

Former hockey team of the National Hockey League and World Hockey Association

Quebec Nordiques Nordiques de Québec
- Founded: 1972
- History: Quebec Nordiques; 1972–1979 (WHA); 1979–1995 (NHL); Colorado Avalanche; 1995–present
- Home arena: Colisée de Québec
- City: Quebec City, Quebec
- Team colours: Blue, red, white
- Stanley Cups: 0
- Avco World Trophies: 1 (1976–77)
- Conference championships: 0
- Presidents' Trophies: 0
- Division championships: 4 (1974–75, 1976–77, 1985–86, 1994–95)

The Quebec Nordiques (French: Nordiques de Québec, pronounced [nɔʁdzɪk] in Quebec French, /nɔːrˈdiːks/ nor-DEEKS in Canadian English; translated "Northmen" or "Northerners") were a professional ice hockey team based in Quebec City. The Nordiques played in the World Hockey Association (1972–1979) and the National Hockey League (1979–1995). The franchise was relocated to Denver in May 1995 and renamed the Colorado Avalanche. They played their home games at the Colisée de Québec from 1972 to 1995.

The Nordiques were the only major professional sports team based in Quebec City in the modern era, and one of two ever; the other, the Quebec Bulldogs, played in the National Hockey Association (NHA) from 1910 to 1917 and one season in the NHL in 1919–20.

== History ==
=== Beginnings in the WHA ===
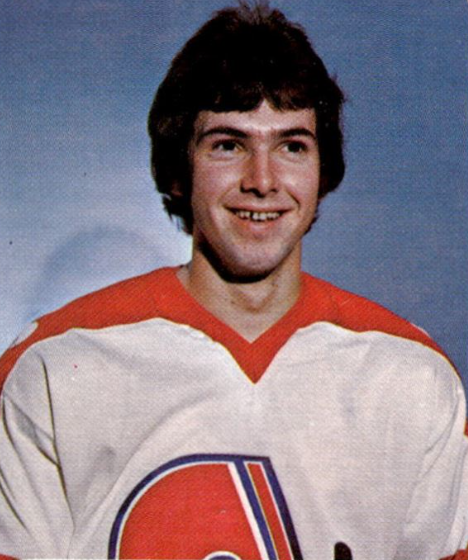
Réal Cloutier was one of the stars that arose for the Nordiques in their WHA days.

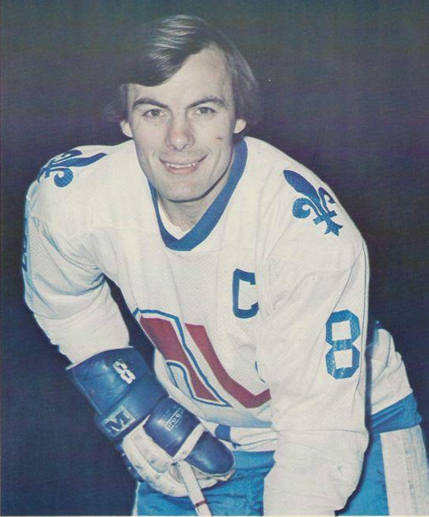
Marc Tardif (pictured in 1979) was the all-time leading scorer in the WHA and won multiple MVP awards with Quebec

The Nordiques formed as one of the original World Hockey Association (WHA) teams in 1972–73. The franchise was originally awarded to a group in San Francisco and sold to a consortium of Quebec City-based businessmen who owned the Quebec Remparts of the Quebec Major Junior Hockey League (QMJHL). They bought the team after the Quebec Aces of the American Hockey League (AHL), relocated to Richmond, Virginia.

On March 29, 1972, the name of the team was announced, and the team name "Les Nordiques" would be used in English. The team was named the Quebec Nordiques because they were one of the northernmost teams in professional sports in North America. Quebec City is located at 47 degrees north latitude; Nordiques translated from French to English means "Northerners" or "Northmen". The only WHA teams located farther north were the Alberta Oilers, who changed their name to the Edmonton Oilers after one season, Calgary Cowboys, Vancouver Blazers, and Winnipeg Jets. They picked a color scheme of powder blue and red for the logo (as designed by Roger Gingras), rejecting a previous rendition in powder and dark blue.

The Nordiques' first head coach was the legendary Maurice "Rocket" Richard but he only lasted two games – a 2–0 loss to the Cleveland Crusaders and a 6–0 win against the Alberta Oilers. Richard decided coaching was not his forte and stepped down.

The Nordiques' first star was two-way defenceman J. C. Tremblay, who led the WHA in assists in the league's first season and was named a league All-Star for his first four years in Quebec. The next season team was joined by Serge Bernier and Rejean Houle. In 1974–75 season, the Nordiques finally made the playoffs with the help of the high-scoring Marc Tardif (acquired in a trade in December 1975). The year also saw the debut of Réal Cloutier, who would rocket to WHA stardom at a young age. They beat the Phoenix Roadrunners and the Minnesota Fighting Saints to reach the finals, where they were swept in four games by the Gordie Howe-led Houston Aeros.

The 1975–76 season saw the squad become a high-flying offensive juggernaut, becoming the only team in major professional history to have five players break 100 points (Tardif, Cloutier, Chris Bordeleau, Bernier and Houle). The season ended in disappointment as the Nordiques lost to the Calgary Cowboys in the first round of the playoffs, after losing Marc Tardif to injury after a controversial hit by the Cowboys' Rick Jodzio.

Despite injuries to Tardif and an aging Tremblay, the Nordiques finally captured the Avco World Trophy in 1976–77 as they took out the New England Whalers and the Indianapolis Racers in five games before beating the Winnipeg Jets in seven games, behind Bernier's record 36 points in 17 playoff games. They represented Canada at the 1977 Izvestia Trophy in Moscow, finishing last with a 0–3–1 record.

By 1978, the WHA was in crisis, and Marcel Aubut, by then the team's president under ownership of the Carling O'Keefe brewer, began checking on interest in the NHL. The Nordiques were unable to defend their title and fell in the 1978 playoffs to the New England Whalers. The 1978–79 season would be the final one for the WHA and for J. C. Tremblay, who retired at the end of the season and had his no. 3 jersey retired.

In January 1979, it was reported that Premier René Lévesque and Parti Québécois would provide $5 million toward the cost of expansion for the Nordiques to get admitted into the NHL, with Lévesque describing the team as "the only truly French team".

=== 1980s ===
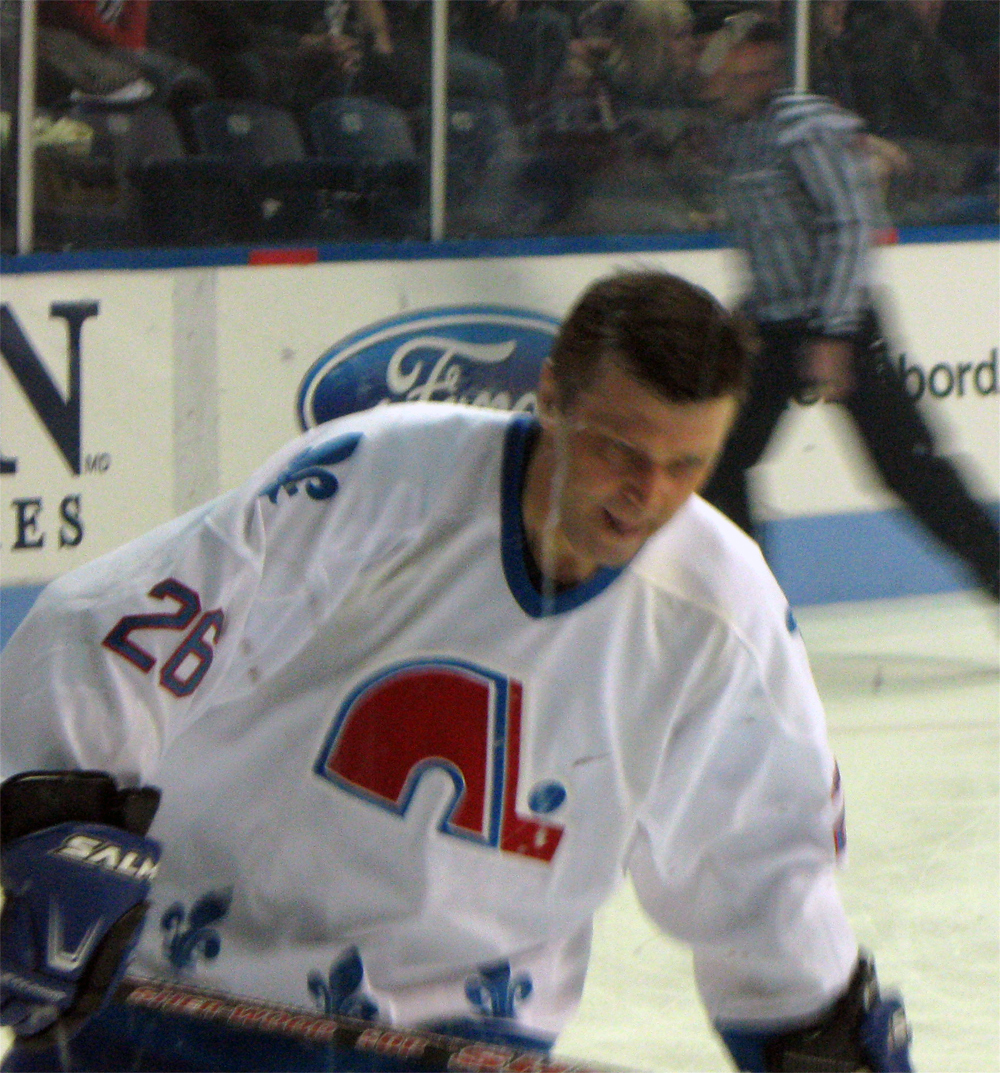
Peter Stastny became the first main star of the Nordiques in the NHL.

As early as 1977, the WHA and NHL had discussions of an NHL–WHA merger that would include all of its surviving Canadian teams, including the Nordiques. When it finally occurred at the end of the 1978-79 season, the Nordiques entered the NHL along with the Whalers, Oilers, and Jets. The Nordiques were placed in the Adams Division of the Prince of Wales Conference, albeit at a high price.

Forced to let all but three players go in a 1979 dispersal draft, the Nordiques sank to the bottom of the standings. They finished the 1979–80 NHL season with the second-worst record in the league despite the play of promising rookie left winger Michel Goulet. An early highlight to the otherwise dreary season came when Réal Cloutier became the second NHL player, following Alex Smart, ever to score a hat trick in his first NHL game.

On August 26, 1980, newly-defected brothers Peter and Anton Stastny, members of the Czechoslovak national team, were signed by the Nordiques as part of a lengthy process, which required the work of the Austrian and Canadian governments. Previously, the team drafted Anton in the 1979 entry draft. Their brother, Marian, would follow and sign with Quebec in the summer of 1981. The following season, led by Peter Stastny's 109-point Calder Memorial Trophy-winning performance, the Nordiques made the Stanley Cup playoffs for the first time, but fell in the best-of-five preliminary round in five games to the Philadelphia Flyers.

Led by Goulet and Peter Stastny, the Nordiques made the playoffs seven years in a row. However, due to the playoff structure during most of the 1980s, the Nordiques faced the near-certainty of having to get past either the Montreal Canadiens or Boston Bruins – or both – to make it to the conference finals. In 1981–82, despite notching only 82 points in the regular season, they defeated the Canadiens and Bruins, both in winner-take-all games on the road. Their Cinderella run ended when they were swept by the defending champion New York Islanders in the conference finals.

The intraprovincial rivalry with the Canadiens intensified during the 1983–84 NHL season culminating in the infamous Good Friday Massacre (French: la bataille du Vendredi Saint) during the 1984 playoffs. The Canadiens scored five unanswered goals in the third period of game 6 at Montreal Forum to eliminate the Nordiques. It is best known for a massive brawl at the tail end of the second period, followed by another brawl as the teams were warning up for the third period. The Habs' scoring outburst came after Peter Stastny and Dale Hunter were ejected in the brawl.

In 1984–85, Montreal and Quebec battled for the Adams Division title. The Nordiques finished with 91 points, at the time their highest point total as an NHL team. However, the Canadiens won the division by three points, including a 7–1 Canadiens' win in Montreal Forum in the final week of the regular season. This was still enough, however, for the Nordiques to garner home-ice advantage for the first time ever as an NHL team. After being pushed to five games by the Buffalo Sabres, they exacted revenge on the Canadiens in the division finals by ousting them in seven games. Peter Stastny clinched the series with an overtime goal in game 7 at the Forum. They then took the powerful Philadelphia Flyers, who had the league's best record, to six games. It would be the franchise's deepest NHL playoff run in Quebec.

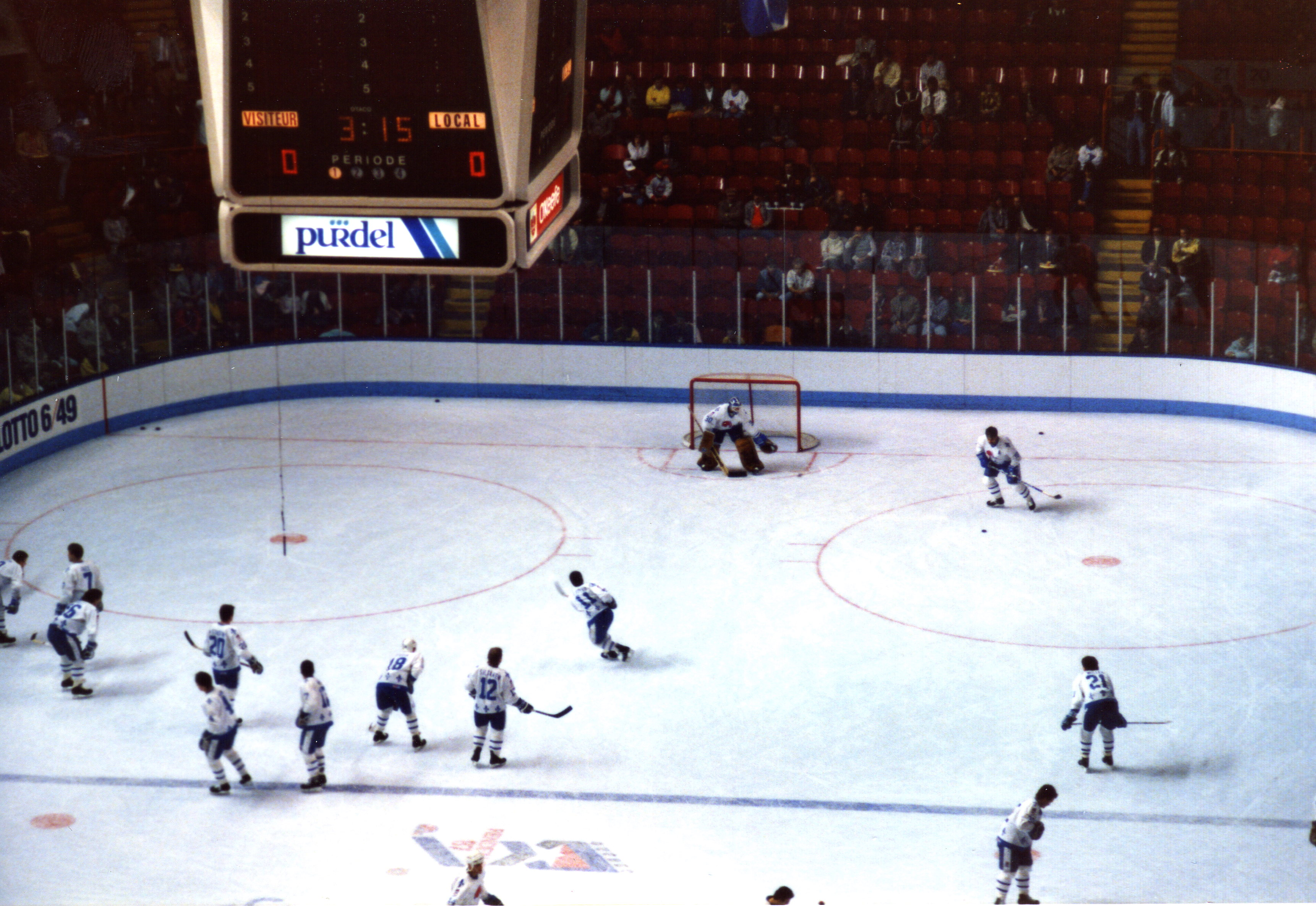
The Nordiques warming up before a game in 1986.

The Nordiques won their first NHL division title in 1985–86, but a defensive collapse in the 1986 playoffs allowed the Hartford Whalers to sweep the Nordiques in three games.

The next season the Nordiques met the Whalers in the division semifinals of the 1987 playoffs for the second straight season, this time Quebec got their revenge beating Hartford in six games. The next round saw more of the Nordiques–Canadiens rivalry as the playoff series went to seven games, with the Canadiens coming out on top. In that same season, when Quebec hosted Rendez-vous '87, an alteration of the NHL All-Star Game to include the Soviet national team, a costumed mascot, Badaboum – a fuzzy, roly-poly blue creature – began entertaining fans at the Colisée de Québec with his bizarre dance routines. Badaboum was created just for Rendez-vous '87, but generated such a following that the Nordiques made him a permanent fixture at home games.

Decline began the following season when the Nordiques finished last in their division – the first of five straight years of finishing at the bottom of the Adams Division – and missed the playoffs for the first time in eight years. In 1988–89 the Nordiques had league-worst 27–46–7 record.

The 1989–90 season saw the return of head coach Michel Bergeron, who had coached the team from 1980 to 1987. The season was also highlighted by the arrival of Hall of Famer Guy Lafleur, who turned down a lucrative offer from the Los Angeles Kings and chose instead to finish his career in his home province. It soon became clear Lafleur's best years were far behind him as he managed only 24 goals in 98 games with Quebec over two seasons. The Nordiques once again finished the season in last place with an abysmal 12–61–7 record.

In March 1990, the Nordiques traded Goulet to the Chicago Blackhawks, while Peter Stastny was sent to the New Jersey Devils respectively. Despite the stellar play of young forward Joe Sakic, the Nordiques struggled throughout the late 1980s and early 1990s. However, in the 1989 NHL entry draft they drafted Swedish prospect Mats Sundin, making him the first European to be selected first overall in an NHL entry draft. In the following draft Quebec chose first again, this time taking Owen Nolan.

=== 1990s ===
==== Lindros draft and trade ====
In the 1991 draft, the Nordiques once again had the first overall pick. They picked junior star Eric Lindros, even though he had let it be known well in advance that he would never play for Quebec. Among the reasons, Lindros cited distance, lack of marketing potential, and having to speak French. After the Nordiques selected him anyway, Lindros then refused to wear the team jersey on draft day and only held it for press photographs. Lindros, on advice of his mother Bonnie, refused to sign with the team and began a holdout that lasted over a year. The Nordiques president publicly announced that they would make Lindros the centrepiece of their franchise turnaround, and refused to trade Lindros, saying that he would not have a career in the NHL as long as he held out. Some of the Nordiques wanted to move on without Lindros, as Joe Sakic commented, "We only want players here who have the passion to play the game. I'm tired of hearing that name. He's not here and there are a lot of others in this locker room who really care about the game." Meanwhile, the Nordiques finished with another dreadful season in 1991–92, missing the 70-point barrier for the fifth year in a row. For the first time since 1988, the Nordiques did not finish with the NHL's worst record, as they finished ahead of the expansion San Jose Sharks in the overall standings.

On June 30, 1992, after confusion over whether Quebec had traded Lindros' rights to the Philadelphia Flyers or New York Rangers was settled by an arbitrator, the Nordiques sent Lindros to the Flyers in exchange for forwards Peter Forsberg and Mike Ricci, goaltender Ron Hextall, defenseman Steve Duchesne and Kerry Huffman, and future considerations, which eventually became enforcer Chris Simon, two first-round picks and US$15 million. One of the draft picks was used by the Nordiques to select goaltender Jocelyn Thibault, the other was traded twice and ultimately used by the Washington Capitals to select Nolan Baumgartner.

After the trade, Lindros said that his refusal to play for the Nordiques had nothing to do with the language question, and more to do with what he saw as a "lack of winning spirit" in the Nordiques organization. However, in 2016, Lindros said that he simply did not want to play for a team owned by Aubut.

The deal transformed the Nordiques from league doormats to a legitimate Stanley Cup contender almost overnight. Forsberg won the Calder Memorial Trophy in 1994–95, his first season with the Nordiques, and would be one of the cornerstones of the Nordiques/Avalanche franchise for almost a decade with his playmaking and physical presence (albeit being out with injury for periods of time like Lindros), winning the Hart Memorial Trophy and Art Ross Trophy in 2002–03. Ricci would give six useful seasons to the franchise before being traded on November 21, 1997. Hextall was moved after a single season to the New York Islanders, and in return the Nordiques got Mark Fitzpatrick (who would go on to be left unprotected in the 1993 NHL expansion draft in which he was claimed by the Florida Panthers) and a first round pick, which the Nordiques used to select Adam Deadmarsh, who would be a key member of the Avalanche Cup-winning teams. Thibault was part of a trade for Montreal goaltender Patrick Roy in December 1995, after the franchise moved to Denver.

==== 1992–1994 ====
During the 1992–93 NHL season, these new players, along with Sakic – now a bona fide NHL All-Star – and the rapidly developing Sundin and Nolan, led Quebec to the biggest single-season turnaround in NHL history. They leaped from 52 points in the previous season to 104 – in the process, going from the second-worst record in the league to the fourth-best (behind only Pittsburgh, Boston and Chicago), as well as notching the franchise's first 100-point season as an NHL team. They made the Stanley Cup playoffs for the first time in six seasons, and also garnered home-ice advantage in the first round for only the third time ever as an NHL team. However, they fell to the eventual Stanley Cup champion Canadiens in the first round, winning the first two games but then losing the next four due to inspired goaltending from Montreal's Patrick Roy. Sakic and Sundin both scored over 100 points each, and head coach Pierre Page was a finalist for the Jack Adams Award.

In 1993–94, the NHL renamed their conferences and divisions to better reflect geography; the Nordiques would be situated in the Northeast Division of the Eastern Conference for their last two seasons of play in Quebec. The Nordiques missed the playoffs in 1993–94 as they struggled with injuries. After the season, Sundin was traded to the Toronto Maple Leafs in return for Wendel Clark. This trade was controversial for both teams, as Sundin was one of the Nordiques' rising talents, while Clark was the Maple Leafs captain and fan favourite. While Clark performed respectably, he then became embroiled in a contract dispute after the season ended and was sent to the New York Islanders.

==== Final season and move to Colorado ====
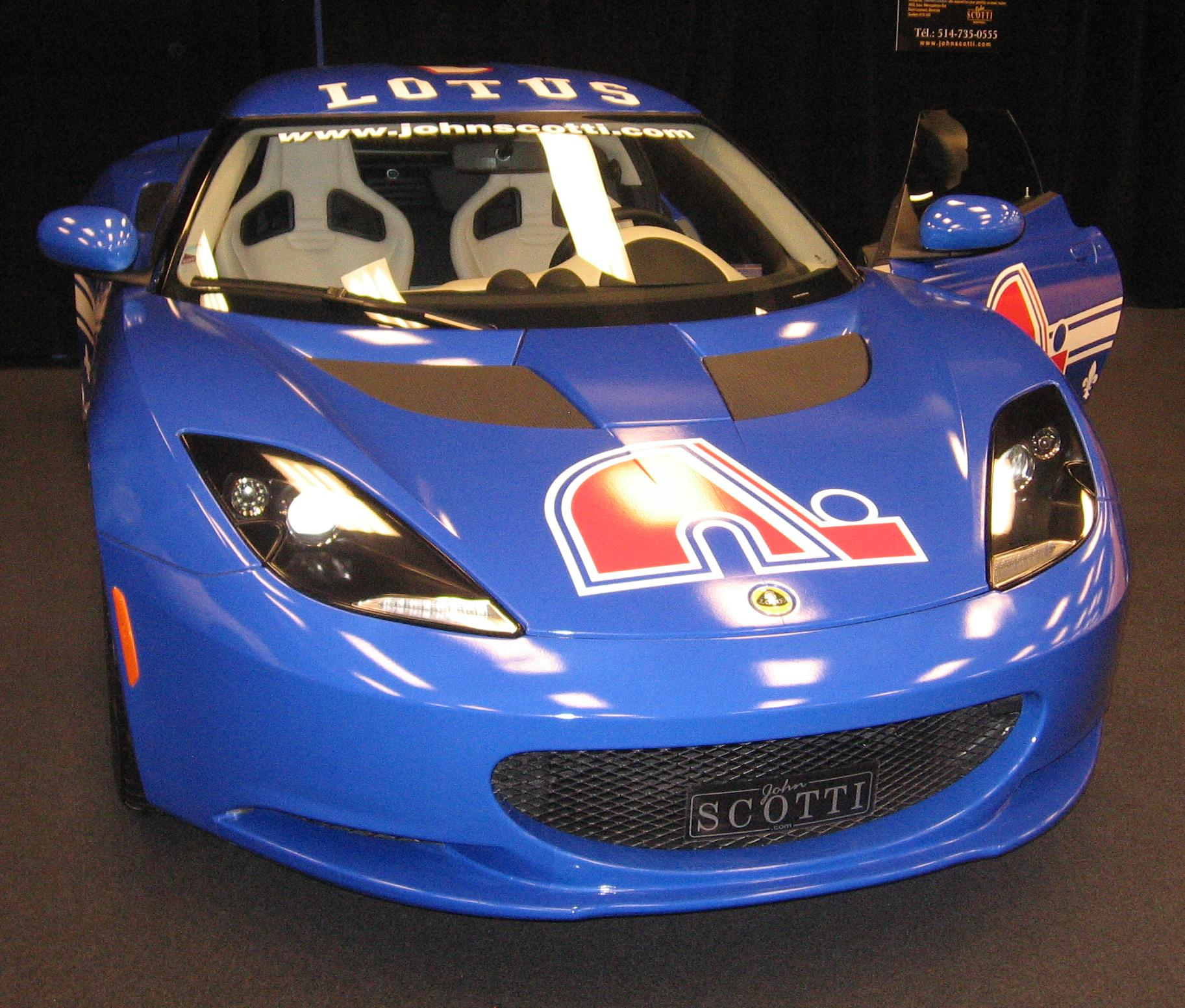
Quebec Nordiques' logo on a Lotus Evora at the 2011 Montreal International Auto Show.

For the 1994–95 season, Marc Crawford was hired as the new head coach, and Forsberg was deemed ready to finally join the team, but first there was the problem of a lockout. In the shortened 48-game season, the Nordiques finished with the best record in the Eastern Conference. However, the team faltered in the 1995 playoffs and was eliminated in the first round by the defending Stanley Cup champion New York Rangers in six games.

The playoff loss proved to be the Nordiques' swan song as the team's financial troubles increasingly took centre stage, even in the face of renewed fan support over the previous three years. The league's Canadian teams found it difficult to compete in a new age of rising player salaries and a weakening Canadian dollar. Quebec City was by far the smallest market in the NHL; it was also the second-smallest major-league city in North America, behind only Green Bay, Wisconsin, home of the National Football League's Green Bay Packers. However, the Packers had long drawn support from the nearby major market of Milwaukee, a luxury the Nordiques did not have.

The Nordiques also faced a unique disadvantage due to Quebec City's status as a virtually monolingual francophone city. There were no privately owned anglophone radio stations and only one privately owned anglophone television station, CKMI. The only anglophone newspaper, the Quebec Chronicle-Telegraph, was a weekly. The near-total lack of English-language media limited the Nordiques' marketability even in their best years, and made many non-French-speaking players wary of playing for them.

While Aubut never lost money on the Nordiques, he feared unsustainable losses without a bailout from Quebec's provincial government. However, Premier Jacques Parizeau turned the request down, as few in Quebec were willing to be seen as subsidizing a hockey club that paid multimillion-dollar salaries. Finally in May 1995, shortly after the Nordiques were eliminated from the playoffs, Aubut announced the acceptance of an offer from COMSAT Entertainment Group, owner of the National Basketball Association's Denver Nuggets, to move the team to Denver, where it was renamed the Colorado Avalanche.

Maintaining their momentum from their successful last season as the Nordiques, the Avalanche won the Stanley Cup in their first season after the move, added another in 2000–01, and then won in 2021–22. They would also win their division every year in their first eight years in Denver for a total of nine consecutive division titles, the second-most in the expansion era.

The last active NHL player who played for the Nordiques was Adam Foote, who announced his retirement after the 2010–11 season. The last active player in any league was Martin Rucinsky, who announced his retirement after the 2014–15 season while playing in the Czech Extraliga. The last active Nordiques draft pick was David Ling, who was drafted 179th overall in the 1993 NHL entry draft and played 93 games in the NHL from 1997 until 2003. Ling finished his professional career with the LNAH's Jonquiere Marquis in 2018.

== Team identity, culture and supporters ==
Les Nordiques' branding revolved around the Flag of Quebec, and both the team and the flag became symbols of Québécois nationalism.

The Nordiques and their supporters were deeply entrenched in Québécois nationalism. From their founding in 1972 as part of the World Hockey Association (WHA), the Quebec Nordiques came to symbolize not only regional pride but also a distinct cultural identity rooted in Francophone heritage and aspirations for political autonomy. Right from their founding, the team leaned into Québécois identity by using a French-language name. Unlike other Canadian teams who sang the Canadian national anthem in English, The Nordiques sang the anthem exclusively in French, which was also the predominant language of the locker room. Throughout their tenure, Francophones dominated the Nordiques' rosters. For most of their tenure, the Nordiques organization operated almost entirely in French, unlike the other NHL teams with large francophone fanbases, the Canadiens and Senators. For example, public address announcements were only given in French.

By the late 1970s and throughout the 1980s, the Nordiques increasingly became associated with Quebec's rising sovereignty movement. The team's logo, uniforms, and branding prominently featured the fleur-de-lis, a long-standing emblem of Quebecois identity and the provincial flag. This visual symbolism resonated with supporters of the Parti Québécois and other pro-independence factions, who viewed the team as an unofficial ambassador for their cultural and political ideals. During games, it was not uncommon to see fans waving Quebec flags or chanting slogans associated with provincial pride.

The team's rivalry with the Montreal Canadiens took on a significance that extended well beyond sport. The Canadiens, based in the province's metropolis and backed by English-speaking ownership (Molson Brewery), were long seen as the traditional power within French-Canadian hockey. By contrast, the Nordiques were owned by the Carling O'Keefe brewing company, a corporate rival to Molson, further reinforcing the cultural and economic dualism between the two sides. While Nordiques supporters identified with Quebec nationalism and Parti Québécois, Canadiens and their supporters came to be seen as supporters of confederation and the Quebec Liberal Party. This rivalry reached its peak during the mid-1980s, particularly in the "Battle of Quebec" playoff series between 1982 and 1987, which featured intense physical confrontations and large-scale fan fervour across political lines.

The Nordiques' success on the ice was interpreted by many as symbolic of Quebec's capability to thrive independently from the rest of Canada. Even mainstream newspapers such as Le Soleil characterized the team in nationalist terms, framing matches against the Canadiens as contests of cultural legitimacy.

By the early 1990s, however, the political edge of the Nordiques' identity began to soften. While the rivalry with Montreal remained intense, it lost much of its earlier ideological sharpness. A new generation of players and fans, along with the economic decline of the region and eventual relocation of the franchise to Colorado in 1995, contributed to a depoliticisation of the club's public image. Nonetheless, in the collective memory of many Quebecers, the Nordiques remain a potent symbol of a unique moment when sport, culture, and nationalism intersected on ice.

Since the departure of the Nordiques, political leaders in Quebec have repeatedly championed the return of teams, framing the team as more than a sports franchise but as a cultural emblem of Francophone pride and regional distinctiveness. Premiers such as Jean Charest and François Legault have publicly supported efforts to build or renovate arenas in Quebec City, arguing that reviving the Nordiques would reaffirm the province's identity on the North American stage. These campaigns often invoke the team's historical role as a symbol of Quebecois nationalism and as a unifying force for pro-sovereignty sentiment during the height of the separatist movement.

== Uniforms ==
The corresponding home (bottom) and away (top) uniforms, which reflected the new logo and colour scheme the team would have adopted.

Throughout their history, the Nordiques were famous for their iconic powder blue and white uniforms. But for their first WHA season, the Nordiques' uniforms featured splashes of red on the shoulders, waist and numbers. From 1973 to 1975, the blue on the Nordiques uniforms briefly reverted to a dark royal blue shade. Contrasting nameplates were used in 1973–74, then the fleur-de-lis symbol was added to the shoulders the following season which was modeled after the flag of Quebec.

Prior to the 1975–76 season, the Nordiques unveiled what was now their standard look, returning to a powder blue base and adding three fleur-de-lis symbols on the waist. Red was only used on the logo. For the first season, the Nordiques wore red pants, but switched to powder blue pants afterwards. This look would be carried over upon joining the NHL in 1979, and other than some minor trim changes on the logo and numbers, remained basically the same until the relocation.

The Colorado Avalanche unveiled the "Reverse Retro" design based on the Nordiques uniforms on November 16, 2020, honouring the legacy of the franchise. On October 21, 2025, the Avalanche unveiled a Nordiques throwback uniform which the team wore for eight (originally seven) games, including two against the Carolina Hurricanes who wore white Hartford Whalers throwback uniforms in honor of both franchises' storied history in the Adams Division; along with two games against ex-provincial rival Montreal Canadiens (the game at Montreal was not included in the original plan, but was approved by the NHL later on).

=== Uniform change ===
Aubut intended to change the team's entire look had he won enough financing to keep the Nordiques in Quebec City for the 1995–96 season. The Nordiques would have abandoned the blue, white, and red palette they had worn throughout their history in favour of a teal, black, and navy scheme. The team would also have abandoned the "igloo holding a hockey stick" logo they had used for their entire existence in favour of a fierce looking Siberian Husky, with "NORDIQUES" in grey block letters below it and the "I" in the team's name fashioned to look like an icicle. These designs were published in local papers before the team ultimately decided to move. Due to the team missing an NHL deadline, the logo and uniforms would not have taken effect until the 1996–97 season.

== Players and personnel ==
=== Team captains ===
This list includes WHA and NHL captains

- Jean-Claude Tremblay, 1972–1975
- Michel Parizeau, 1975–1976
- Marc Tardif, 1975–1981
- Robbie Ftorek, 1981
- Andre Dupont, 1981–1982
- Mario Marois, 1983–1985
- Peter Stastny, 1985–1990
- Steven Finn and Joe Sakic 1990–1991 (co-captains)
- Mike Hough 1991–1992
- Joe Sakic 1992–1995

=== Head coaches ===
This list includes WHA and NHL head coaches

- Maurice Richard, 1972
- Maurice Filion, 1972–1973
- Jacques Plante, 1973–1974
- Jean-Guy Gendron, 1974–1976
- Marc Boileau, 1976–1978
- Maurice Filion, 1977–1978
- Jacques Demers, 1978–1980
- Maurice Filion, 1980
- Michel Bergeron, 1980–1987
- Andre Savard, 1987
- Ron Lapointe, 1987–1989
- Jean Perron, 1989
- Michel Bergeron, 1989–1990
- Dave Chambers, 1990–1991
- Pierre Page, 1991–1994
- Marc Crawford, 1994–1995

=== Hall of Famers ===
- Peter Forsberg, C, 1994–95, inducted in 2014
- Michel Goulet, LW, 1979–1990, inducted in 1998
- Pierre Lacroix, general manager, 1994–1995, inducted in 2023
- Guy Lafleur, RW, 1989–1991, inducted in 1988
- Joe Sakic, C, 1988–1995, inducted in 2012
- Peter Stastny, C, 1980–1990, inducted in 1998
- Mats Sundin, C, 1990–1994, inducted in 2012

Forsberg, Goulet, Lacroix, Sakic, and Stastny earned their Hall of Fame credentials primarily with the Nordiques or their successors, the Avalanche.

=== Retired numbers ===
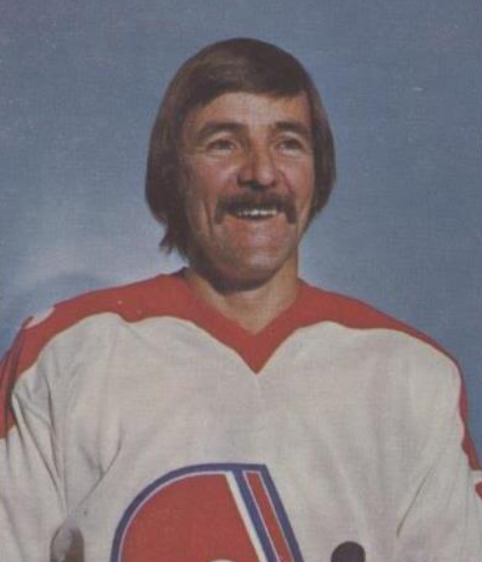
J. C. Tremblay with the Nordiques, c. 1975. He was the first Nordique to have his jersey retired and was one of very few players to have their number retired by an NHL team despite never playing in the NHL with them.

Quebec Nordiques retired numbers
No.	Player	Position	Career	Date of retirement
3	J. C. Tremblay	D	1972–1979	October 28, 1979
8	Marc Tardif	LW	1974–1983	November 1, 1983
16	Michel Goulet	LW	1979–1990	March 16, 1995
26	Peter Stastny	C	1980–1990	February 4, 1996

After the move to Denver, the Avalanche returned all four of these numbers to circulation.

=== First-round draft picks ===
Note: This list does not include selections from the WHA.

- 1979: Michel Goulet (20th overall)
- 1981: Randy Moller (11th overall)
- 1982: David Shaw (13th overall)
- 1984: Trevor Stienburg (15th overall)
- 1985: David Latta (15th overall)
- 1986: Ken McRae (18th overall)
- 1987: Bryan Fogarty (9th overall) and Joe Sakic (15th overall)
- 1988: Curtis Leschyshyn (3rd overall) and Daniel Dore (5th overall)
- 1989: Mats Sundin (1st overall)
- 1990: Owen Nolan (1st overall)
- 1991: Eric Lindros (1st overall)
- 1992: Todd Warriner (4th overall)
- 1993: Jocelyn Thibault (10th overall) and Adam Deadmarsh (14th overall)
- 1994: Wade Belak (12th overall) and Jeff Kealty (22nd overall)

=== Franchise scoring leaders ===
These are the top-ten point-scorers in Quebec Nordiques history, combining NHL and WHA totals.

Legend: Pos = Position; GP = Games played; G = Goals; A = Assists; Pts = Points; P/G = Points per game

Points
Player	Pos	GP	G	A	Pts	P/G
Peter Stastny	C	737	380	668	1,048	1.42
Michel Goulet	LW	813	456	490	946	1.16
Real Cloutier	RW	605	405	445	850	1.40
Marc Tardif	LW	620	380	443	823	1.33
Anton Stastny	LW	650	252	384	636	.98
Joe Sakic	C	508	234	392	626	1.23
Serge Bernier	RW	495	240	358	598	1.21
Dale Hunter	C	523	140	318	458	.88
J. C. Tremblay	D	454	66	358	424	.93
Mats Sundin	C	324	135	199	334	1.03

== Broadcasters ==
The Nordiques were unique in that they were the only Canadian or American team in the four major sports to never broadcast any matches locally in English. This was due to the Quebec City region having a tiny percentage of anglophones (about 1.4% of the local population, according to the 2021 census).

=== Radio ===
==== Stations ====
WHA

- CJRP – 1972–1973, 1973–1974 (home matches only)
- CKCV – 1973–1974 (away matches only), 1974–1979

NHL

- CKCV – 1979–1984
- CHRC – 1984–1990, 1994–1995 (following merger with CJRP)
- CJRP – 1990–1994

==== Play-by-play ====
- Claude Bedard – 1972–1973, 1975–1978
- Unknown – 1973–1974
- Jean Pouliot – 1974–1975
- Andre Cote – 1978–1995

==== Colour commentators ====
- Guy Lemieux – 1972–1973
- Unknown – 1973–1974
- Paddy Pedneault – 1974–1975
- Marc Simoneau – 1975–1978
- Michel Villeneuve – 1978–1984
- Andre Belisle – 1984–1988
- Michel Carrier – 1988–1990
- Jacques Demers – 1990–1992
- Jean Perron – 1992–1994
- Mario Marois – 1994–1995

=== Television ===
The Nordiques' NHL games were televised locally by CFAP 2 from 1987 to 1994. The WHA games were broadcast by CFCM from 1972 to 1976, with no local television from 1976 to 1978, except the Super Series '76-77 match versus CSKA Moscow which was on Ici Radio-Canada Télé, local station CBVT-DT, and some Avco Cup final matches against Winnipeg, same outlet.

==== Play-by-play ====
- Jacques Moreau – 1972–1976
- Claude Bedard – 1978–1984
- Andre Cote – 1984–1995

==== Colour commentators ====
- Guy Lemieux – 1972–1973
- Claude Bedard – 1973–1976
- Jean-Guy Gendron – 1978–1979
- Claude Thiffault – 1979–1980
- Francois Lacombe – 1980–1983
- Pierre Bouchard – 1983–1984
- Claude Bedard – 1984–1995
- Mike Bossy – 1988–1991

== See also ==
- Potential National Hockey League expansion
- Videotron Centre
