= Marc Boileau =

Canadian ice hockey player and coach

- Born: September 3, 1933 Pointe Claire, Quebec, Canada
- Died: December 27, 2000 (aged 68)
- Height: 5 ft 11 in (180 cm)
- Weight: 170 lb (77 kg; 12 st 2 lb)
- Position: Centre
- Shot: Left
- Played for: Detroit Red Wings
- Playing career: 1953–1973

Marc Claude Boileau (September 3, 1932 – December 27, 2000) was a Canadian ice hockey player and coach. He played 55 games in the National Hockey League with the Detroit Red Wings during the 1961–62 season. The rest of his career, which lasted from 1953 to 1973, was spent in the minor leagues, mainly in the Western Hockey League. After his playing career Boileau worked as a coach, and coached the Pittsburgh Penguins of the NHL from 1974 to 1976, and then the Quebec Nordiques of the World Hockey Association (WHA) from 1976 to 1978.

== Life and career ==
Boileau was born in Pointe Claire, Quebec and went on to a successful ice-hockey career as both player and coach. Boileau is the son of Rose-Berthe Pilon and former NHL player René Boileau, who played for the New York Americans in the 1925–26 season.

Boileau began his playing career with Verdun Lasalle in 1950–51 before moving on to the St. Jerome Eagles the following year. At the age of 20 he moved up to Major Junior Hockey and spent half the 1952-53 season playing for the Montreal Junior Canadiens of the QJHLs. The second half of that season he finished with the Kitchener Greenshirts.

He signed his first professional contract in 1953 and played with the Cincinnati Mohawks for the 1953–54 season. He played with an assortment of minor-league teams for eight years before finally getting the chance to perform in the NHL.

Known for his determined work ethic but also for his temper, Boileau was an established minor league fixture, playing with the Indianapolis Chiefs, Seattle Totems, Hershey Bears, Los Angeles Blades, and Fort Wayne Komets. He retired from playing in 1973 at age 40 with over 1000 games of minor league experience.

Boileau played one season in the National Hockey League. It was in 1961–62 when Boileau played 55 games with the Detroit Red Wings. He was told to concentrate primarily on his defensive duties. He also scored five goals and eleven points. Despite a relatively strong on-ice performance, the Red Wings were unable to find a roster spot for him beyond that season and he never played in the NHL again.

He continued his career as a head coach, beginning with the Fort Wayne Komets, winning the Turner Cup in the 1972–73 season. Boileau went on to become head coach of the NHL's Pittsburgh Penguins from 1973 to 1976. He won the Avco Cup as head coach of the Quebec Nordiques in the World Hockey Association in 1977. He finished his U.S. coaching career with the Flint Generals from 1978 to 1981. Marc went on to coach in The Netherlands (Kemphanen Eindhoven and Tilburg Trappers) and France (Amiens Gothiques) to finish his career.

== Personal life ==
Boileau was married to Yolande Therese Bastien from 1953 until her death in 1989. They had 5 children, Maryse Juliette, Claude Marc, Jean, Pierre Bernard, and Luc Dalton.

Boileau died of an apparent heart attack on December 27, 2000.

== Career statistics ==
=== Regular season and playoffs ===
			Regular season					Playoffs
Season	Team	League	GP	G	A	Pts	PIM	GP	G	A	Pts	PIM
1950–51	Verdun LaSalle	QJHL	45	5	8	13	6	3	0	1	1	0
1951–52	Sainte-Jerome Aigles	QJHL	36	17	17	34	16	—	—	—	—	—
1952–53	Kitchener Greenshirts	OHA	29	10	19	29	0	—	—	—	—	—
1953–54	Cincinnati Mohawks	IHL	38	12	21	33	13	11	1	1	2	0
1955–56	Saint John Beavers	ACSHL	63	22	43	65	66	15	5	3	8	9
1955–56	Saint John Beavers	Al-Cup	—	—	—	—	—	5	1	0	1	9
1956–57	Indianapolis Chiefs	IHL	60	25	32	57	50	5	2	3	5	2
1957–58	Indianapolis Chiefs	IHL	63	26	61	87	64	11	8	5	13	7
1958–59	Seattle Totems	WHL	67	17	30	47	52	12	10	7	17	10
1959–60	Seattle Totems	WHL	68	32	45	77	54	4	0	0	0	5
1960–61	Seattle Totems	WHL	70	42	31	73	49	11	5	4	9	14
1961–62	Detroit Red Wings	NHL	55	5	6	11	8	—	—	—	—	—
1961–62	Hershey Bears	AHL	14	7	8	15	6	—	—	—	—	—
1962–63	Los Angeles Blades	WHL	66	17	45	62	77	3	0	3	3	2
1963–64	Los Angeles Blades	WHL	69	12	32	44	35	12	3	3	6	33
1964–65	Los Angeles Blades	WHL	60	12	23	35	62	—	—	—	—	—
1965–66	Los Angeles Blades	WHL	72	10	29	39	48	—	—	—	—	—
1967–68	Seattle Totems	WHL	66	6	31	37	41	9	3	2	5	4
1968–69	Seattle Totems	WHL	73	14	30	44	42	2	0	0	0	0
1969–70	Seattle Totems	WHL	73	16	28	44	65	6	1	0	1	8
1970–71	Fort Wayne Komets	IHL	67	19	40	59	35	2	0	1	1	0
1971–72	Fort Wayne Komets	IHL	66	11	44	55	27	6	0	6	6	4
1972–73	Fort Wayne Komets	IHL	2	0	0	0	0	—	—	—	—	—
WHL totals			684	178	324	502	525	59	22	19	41	76
NHL totals			55	5	6	11	8	—	—	—	—	—

== Coaching record ==
Team	Year	Regular season						Postseason			
Team	Year	G	W	L	OTL	Pts	Finish	W	L	Win%	Result
Pittsburgh Penguins	1973–74	28	14	10	4	32	5th in West	—	—	—	—
Pittsburgh Penguins	1974–75	80	37	28	15	89	3rd in Norris	5	4	.556	Lost in Quarterfinals (NYI)
Pittsburgh Penguins	1975–76	43	15	23	5	35	Fired	—	—	—	—
Quebec Nordiques	1976–77	81	47	31	3	97	1st in East	12	5	.706	Won Avco Cup (WPG)
Quebec Nordiques	1977–78	80	40	37	3	83	4th in WHA	5	6	.455	Lost in Semifinals (NEW)
NHL totals		151	66	61	24			5	4	.556	
WHA totals		161	87	68	6			17	11	.607	
Total		312	153	129	30			22	15	.595	

Preceded by Ken Schinkel	Head coach of the Pittsburgh Penguins; 1974–76	Succeeded by Ken Schinkel
Preceded by Jean-Guy Gendron	Head coach of the Quebec Nordiques; 1976–78	Succeeded by Maurice Filion
