= Jacques Plante =

Canadian ice hockey player (1929–1986)

- Hockey Hall of Fame, 1978
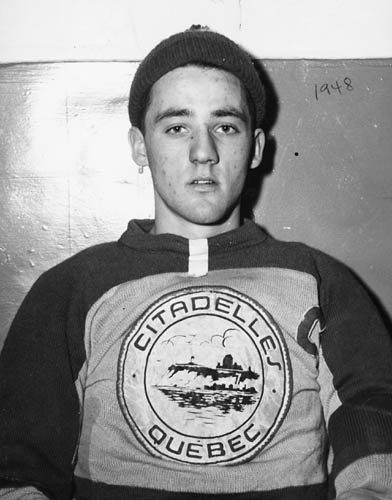
- Plante with the Quebec Citadelles in 1948
- Born: January 17, 1929 Notre-Dame-du-Mont-Carmel, Quebec, Canada
- Died: February 27, 1986 (aged 57) Geneva, Switzerland
- Height: 6 ft 0 in (183 cm)
- Weight: 175 lb (79 kg; 12 st 7 lb)
- Position: Goaltender
- Caught: Left
- Played for: Montreal Canadiens; New York Rangers; St. Louis Blues; Toronto Maple Leafs; Boston Bruins; Edmonton Oilers
- Playing career: 1947–1965: 1968–1973; 1974–1975

Joseph Jacques Omer Plante (French pronunciation: [ʒɑk plɑ̃t]; January 17, 1929 – February 27, 1986) was a Canadian professional ice hockey player. During a career as a goaltender lasting from 1947 to 1975, he was considered to be one of the most important innovators in hockey. He played for the Montreal Canadiens from 1953 to 1963; during his tenure, the team won the Stanley Cup six times, including five consecutive wins. In 2017 Plante was named one of the "100 Greatest NHL Players" in history.

Plante retired in 1965 but was persuaded to return to the National Hockey League to play for the expansion St. Louis Blues in 1968. He was later traded to the Toronto Maple Leafs in 1970 and to the Boston Bruins in 1973. He joined the World Hockey Association as a coach and general manager for the Quebec Nordiques in 1973–74. He then played goal for the Edmonton Oilers in 1974–75, ending his professional career with that team.

Plante was the first NHL goaltender to wear a goaltender mask in regulation play on a regular basis. He developed and tested many versions of the mask (including the forerunner of today's mask/helmet combination) with the assistance of other experts. Plante was the first NHL goaltender to regularly play the puck outside his crease in support of his team's defencemen, and he often instructed his teammates from behind the play. Plante was inducted into the Hockey Hall of Fame in 1978, was chosen as the goaltender of the Canadiens' "dream team" in 1985, and was inducted into the Quebec Sports Pantheon in 1994. The Montreal Canadiens retired Plante's jersey, #1, the following year. Plante ranks seventh among NHL goalies for all-time career wins with 437.

== Early life ==
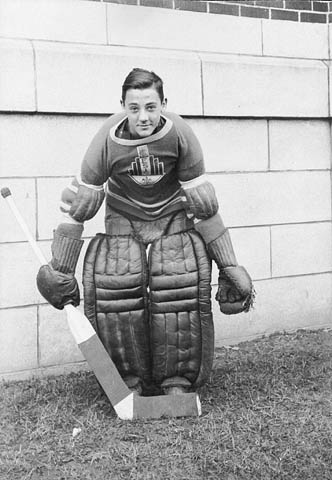
Jacques Plante in the 1944–45 season, aged 15 or 16

Plante was born on a farm near Notre-Dame-du-Mont-Carmel, in Mauricie, Quebec, on January 17, 1929, the first of 11 children born to Palma and Xavier Plante. The family moved to Shawinigan Falls, where his father worked in one of the local factories. In 1932, Plante began to play hockey, skateless and with a tennis ball, using a goaltender's hockey stick his father had carved from a tree root. When he was five years old, Plante fell off a ladder and broke his hand. The fracture failed to heal properly and affected his playing style during his early hockey career; he underwent successful corrective surgery as an adult.

Plante suffered from asthma starting in early childhood. This prevented him from skating for extended periods, so he gravitated to playing goaltender. As his playing progressed, Jacques received his first regulation goaltender's stick for Christmas of 1936. His father made Plante's first pads by stuffing potato sacks and reinforcing them with wooden panels. As a child, Plante played hockey outdoors in the bitterly cold Quebec winters. His mother taught him how to knit his own tuques to protect him from the cold. Plante continued knitting and embroidering throughout his life and wore his hand-knitted tuques while playing and practicing until entering the National Hockey League (NHL).

Plante's first foray into organized hockey came at age 12. He was watching his school's team practice when the coach ordered the goaltender off the ice after a heated argument over his play, and Plante asked to replace him. The coach permitted him to play since there was no other available goaltender; it was quickly apparent that Plante could hold his own, despite the other players being many years older than he was. He impressed the coach and stayed on as the team's number-one goaltender.

Two years later, Plante was playing for five different teams—the local factory team, and teams in the midget, juvenile, junior, and intermediate categories. Plante demanded a salary from the factory team's coach after his father told him that the other players were being paid because they were company employees. The coach paid Plante 50 cents per game to retain him and maintain the team's popularity. Afterwards, Plante began to receive various offers from other teams; he was offered $80 per week—a considerable sum in those days—to play for a team in England, and a similar offer to play for the Providence Reds of the American Hockey League. Plante passed them up because his parents wanted him to finish high school. He graduated with top honours in 1947. Upon graduation, he took a job as a clerk in a Shawinigan factory. A few weeks later, the Quebec Citadels offered Plante $85 per week to play for them; he accepted, marking the beginning of his professional career.

In 1949, he married Jacqueline Gagné; they had two sons, Michel and Richard.

== Playing career ==
=== Minor leagues ===
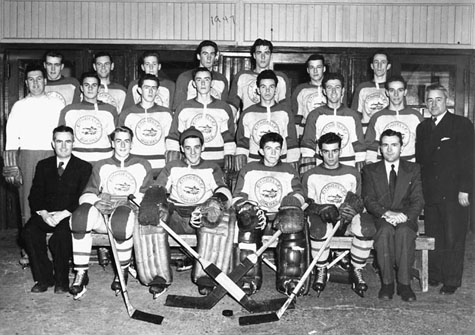
Plante, seated in front in tuque, with the Quebec Citadelles

Jacques joined the Quebec Citadelles in 1947. While playing for Quebec, Plante started to play the puck outside his crease, a technique he developed when he recognized that the team's defense was performing poorly. Fans found Plante's unconventional playing style to be exciting, but it angered his managers, who believed that a goaltender should stay in the net and let his players recover the puck. Plante had concluded that as long as he was in control of the puck, the opponents could not shoot it at him – this is now standard practice for goaltenders. The same season, the Citadelles beat the Montreal Junior Canadiens in the league finals, with Plante being named the most valuable player on his team. The Montreal Canadiens' general manager, Frank J. Selke, became interested in acquiring Plante as a member of the team. In 1948, Plante received an invitation to the Canadiens' training camp. On August 17, 1949, Selke offered Plante a contract. Plante played for Montreal's affiliate Royal Montreal Hockey Club, earning $4,500 for the season, and an extra $500 for practicing with the Canadiens.

In January 1953, Plante was called up to play for the Canadiens. Bill Durnan, the goaltender who played for Montreal when Plante first began, had retired in 1950, and Gerry McNeil, their top goaltender, had fractured his jaw. Plante played three games, but in that short time, he generated controversy. Coach Dick Irvin Sr. did not wish his players to stand out by any addition to their regular uniforms. Plante always wore one of his tuques while playing hockey, and after an argument with Irvin, all of Plante's tuques had vanished from the Montreal locker room. Even without his good luck charm, Plante gave up only four goals in the three games he played, all of them wins.

Later during the 1952–53 NHL season, Plante played in the playoffs against the Chicago Black Hawks. He won his first playoff game with a shutout. Montreal won that series and eventually, the Stanley Cup, and Plante's name was engraved on the Cup for the first time.

At the beginning of 1953, McNeil was still the starting goaltender for the Canadiens. Selke assigned Plante to the Buffalo Bisons of the American Hockey League so fans in the United States would get to know him. Plante was instantly successful; Fred Hunt, the general manager of the Bisons, told Kenny Reardon, Montreal's recruiting manager, "he's [Plante] the biggest attraction since the good old days of Terry Sawchuk."

=== Montreal Canadiens ===
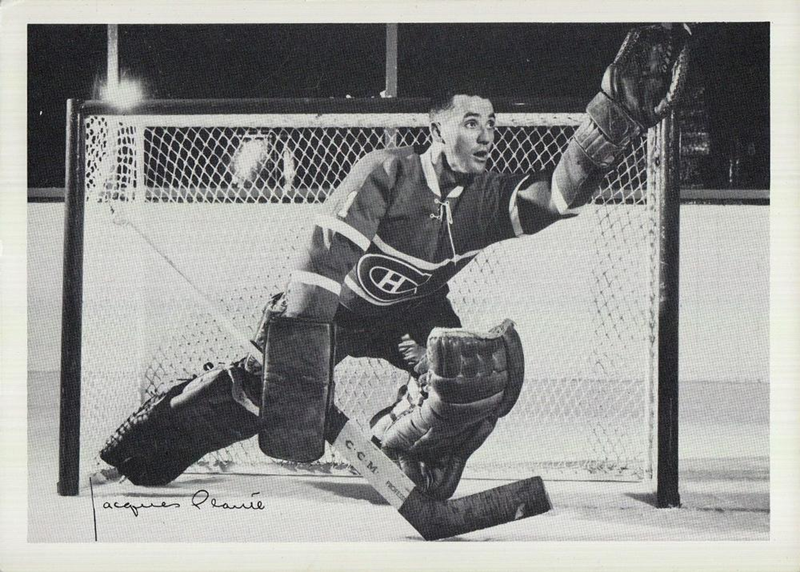
1960–61 card of Plante for the Montreal Canadiens

By the end of the 1953–54 season, Plante was well-entrenched within the NHL. In the spring of 1954, he underwent surgery to correct his left hand, which he had broken in his childhood. He could not move his hand well enough to catch high shots and compensated by using the rest of his body. The operation was successful.

On February 12, 1954, Plante was called up to the Canadiens and established himself as their starting goaltender – he did not return to the minor leagues for many years. Plante was the Canadiens' number one goaltender at the beginning of the 1954–55 NHL season. On March 13, 1955, with only four games left in the season, an on-ice brawl resulted in the suspension of Montreal's leading scorer, Maurice Richard, for the rest of the season and the playoffs. Four nights later, playing in Montreal in front of an angry crowd, Plante was witness to the riot that followed. The Canadiens subsequently lost to the Detroit Red Wings in the finals.

For the 1955–56 season, Plante was the unchallenged starting goaltender of the Canadiens; Gerry McNeil had not played the previous season and was sent to the Montreal Royals. Charlie Hodge, Plante's backup the previous season, was sent to the Seattle Americans, a Canadiens' farm team.

Later that season, Montreal won the Stanley Cup, the first of what would be five consecutive Stanley Cup championship seasons. For his part, Plante won the first of five consecutive Vezina Trophies. The next season, Plante missed most of November because of chronic bronchitis, a consequence of asthma that had affected him since childhood. During the 1957–58 NHL season, the Canadiens won their third straight Stanley Cup despite injuries to Plante and other members of the team. Plante's asthma was getting worse. He sustained a concussion with just a few weeks left in the season and missed three games of the playoffs. In the sixth game of the Stanley Cup finals, Plante's asthma was making him dizzy, and he was having difficulty concentrating; he collapsed at the end of the game after teammate Doug Harvey scored the series-winning goal. The Canadiens went on to win the Stanley Cup again at the close of the 1958–59 season.

==== Goalie mask ====
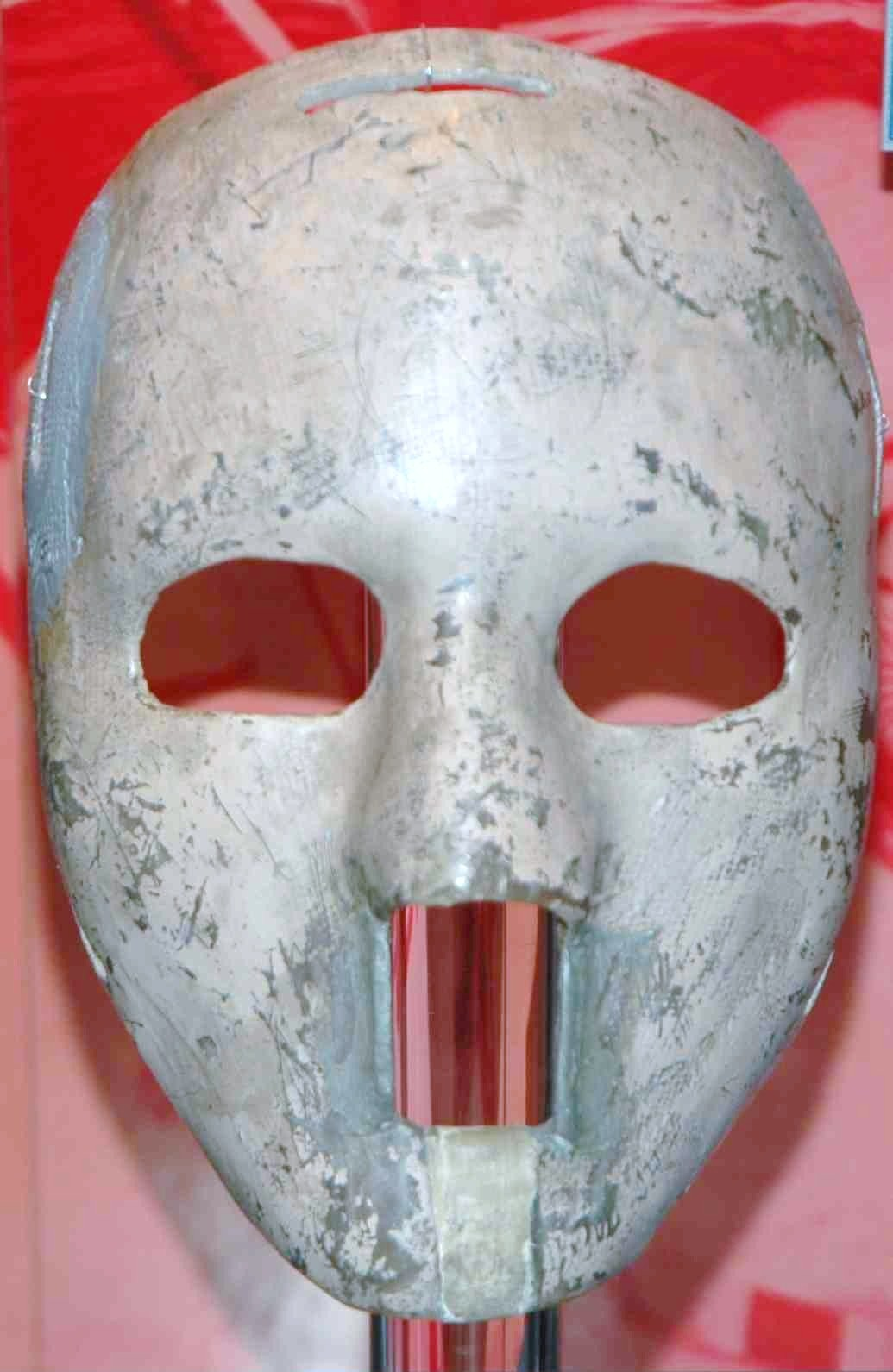
Plante's original fibreglass mask

During the 1959–60 season, Plante wore a goaltender mask for the first time in a regular season game. Although Plante had used his mask in practice since 1956 after missing 13 games because of a sinusitis operation, head coach Toe Blake was afraid it would impair his vision and would not permit him to wear it during regulation play. However, on November 1, 1959, Plante's nose was broken when he was hit by a shot fired by Andy Bathgate three minutes into a game against the New York Rangers, and he was taken to the dressing room for stitches. When he returned, he was wearing the crude homemade goaltender mask that he had been using in practices. Blake was livid, but he had no other goaltender to call upon and Plante refused to return to the goal unless he wore the mask. Blake agreed on the condition that Plante discard the mask when the cut healed. The Canadiens won the game 3–1. During the following days, Plante refused to discard the mask, and as the Canadiens continued to win, Blake was less vocal about it. The unbeaten streak stretched to 18 games. Plante did not wear the mask, at Blake's request, against Detroit on March 8, 1960; the Canadiens lost 3–0, and the mask returned permanently the next night. That year, the Canadiens won their fifth straight Stanley Cup, which was Plante's last.

Plante subsequently designed his own and other goaltenders' masks. He was not the first NHL goaltender known to wear a face mask. Montreal Maroons' Clint Benedict wore a crude leather version in 1930 to protect a broken nose, but Plante introduced the mask as everyday equipment, and it is now mandatory equipment for goaltenders.

=== Trade to New York and first retirement ===
Hampered by terrible pain in his left knee during the 1960–61 NHL season, Plante was sent down to the minor league Montreal Royals. Torn cartilage was found in his knee, and the knee was surgically repaired during the summer of 1961. The next season, Plante became the fourth goaltender to win the Hart Memorial Trophy, while winning the Vezina Trophy for the sixth time. The 1962–63 season was unsettling for Plante. His asthma had worsened, and he missed most of the early season. His relationship with his coach, Toe Blake, continued to deteriorate because of Plante's persistent health problems. Later, Plante was at the centre of a major controversy when he claimed that net sizes in the NHL were not uniform, thus giving a statistical advantage to goaltenders playing for the Chicago Black Hawks, Boston Bruins, and New York Rangers. His claim was later confirmed as the result of a manufacturing error.

After the Canadiens were eliminated for the third straight year in the first playoff round during the spring of 1963, there was mounting pressure for change from their fans and media. Growing tension between Plante and Blake because of Plante's inconsistent work ethic and demeanor caused Blake to declare that for the 1963–64 season either he or Plante must go. On June 4, 1963, Plante was traded to the New York Rangers, with Phil Goyette and Don Marshall in exchange for Gump Worsley, Dave Balon, Leon Rochefort, and Len Ronson. Plante played for the Rangers for one full season and part of a second. He retired in 1965 while playing for the Rangers' AHL affiliate, the Baltimore Clippers. His wife was ill at the time, and he required surgery on his right knee.

Upon retirement, Plante took a job with Molson as a sales representative but remained active in the NHL. In 1965, Scotty Bowman asked Plante to play for the Montreal Jr. Canadiens in a game against the Soviet National Team. Honoured to represent his country, Plante agreed, and after receiving permission from both the Rangers (who owned his rights) and Molson, he began practising. The Canadiens won 2–1, and Plante was named first star of the game.

=== Comeback to professional hockey ===
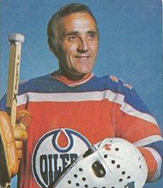
Plante with the Edmonton Oilers in 1974

At the beginning of the 1967–68 NHL season, Plante received a call from his ex-teammate Bert Olmstead seeking some help coaching the expansion Oakland Seals. Plante coached mainly by example, and after the three-week training camp, he returned home to Montreal. Plante also played an exhibition game with the Seals. Rumours swirled that Plante was planning a comeback.

In June 1968, Plante was selected in an intraleague draft by the St. Louis Blues and signed for $35,000 for the 1968–69 season. In his first season with the Blues, Plante split the goaltending duties with Glenn Hall. He won the Vezina Trophy that season for the seventh time, surpassing Bill Durnan's record. While playing for the Blues in the 1969–70 playoffs against the Boston Bruins, a shot fired by Fred Stanfield and redirected by Phil Esposito hit Plante in the forehead, knocking him out and breaking his fibreglass mask. The first thing Plante said after he regained consciousness at the hospital was that the mask saved his life. That game proved to be his last for the Blues, and he was traded in the summer of 1970 to the Toronto Maple Leafs. He led the NHL with the lowest goals against average (GAA) during his first season with the Maple Leafs. That season, he also tied a Leafs franchise record, winning 9 straight games. At season's end, he was named to the NHL's second All-Star team, his seventh such honour. Late in the 1972–73 season, Plante was traded to the Boston Bruins. While he had two shutouts in eight regular season games, Plante struggled in the playoffs, and after conceding 10 goals in two games, he was replaced as the starter.

Plante accepted a $1 million, 10-year contract to become coach and general manager of the Quebec Nordiques of the World Hockey Association in 1973. He was highly dissatisfied with his and the team's performance and resigned at the end of the 1973–74 season. Coming out of retirement once more, Plante played 31 games for the Edmonton Oilers of the WHA in the 1974–75 season. Plante retired during the Oilers' training camp in 1975–76 after receiving news that his youngest son had died.

== Hockey analysis and coaching ==
Plante had a well-earned reputation for his ability to analyse the game of hockey. He began shouting directions to his teammates during games in his first stint in the minor leagues (the goaltender usually has the best view of the game). He kept extensive notes on opposing players and teams throughout his career. He made his debut in the broadcasting booth during his first retirement in the 1960s as a colour commentator for broadcasts of Quebec Junior League games alongside Danny Gallivan of Hockey Night in Canada fame. Radio Canada, the French language branch of the Canadian Broadcasting Corporation, brought Plante aboard as an on-air analyst for its television broadcasts of the 1972 Summit Series between the national team of the Soviet Union and a Canadian team made up of professional players from the NHL. Plante was one of the few North American analysts who dissented from the widely held belief in the superiority of the Canadian team.

Plante also wrote extensively on hockey. He wrote hockey columns starting early in his career and was published in La Voix de Shawinigan, Le Samedi, and Sport Magazine. He alienated local reporters by writing a column for the local paper during his time as coach of the Quebec Nordiques. His seminal work, On Goaltending, was published in 1972 in English, with the French edition (entitled Devant le filet) published in 1973. In his book, Plante outlined a program of goaltender development that included off-ice exercises, choice of equipment, styles of play, and game-day preparation. He also advised on best coaching methods for both young and advanced goaltenders. His book remained popular with coaches and players and was reprinted in both French and English in 1997, 25 years after it was first published.

Starting in 1967, Plante was one of the instructors at École moderne de hockey, a summer hockey school for young players. His reputation as a teacher spread, and he traveled to Sweden in 1972 at the invitation of the Swedish Hockey Federation, teaching the top goaltenders in the country and their coaches and trainers. During his first and second retirements, Plante also coached goaltenders and consulted for several NHL teams, including the Oakland Seals, Philadelphia Flyers, Montreal Canadiens and St. Louis Blues.

== Retirement and death ==
Plante finally retired from hockey in 1975, after the death of his youngest son. He moved to Switzerland with his second wife, Raymonde Udrisard, but remained active on the North American hockey scene as an analyst, adviser, and goaltender trainer. He was inducted into the Hockey Hall of Fame in 1978. In the fall of 1985, Plante was diagnosed with terminal stomach cancer. He died in a Geneva hospital in February 1986 and was buried in Sierre, Switzerland. When his coffin was carried from the church following the funeral mass, it passed under an arch of hockey sticks held high by a team of young hockey players from Quebec, visiting Switzerland for a tournament.

== Legacy ==
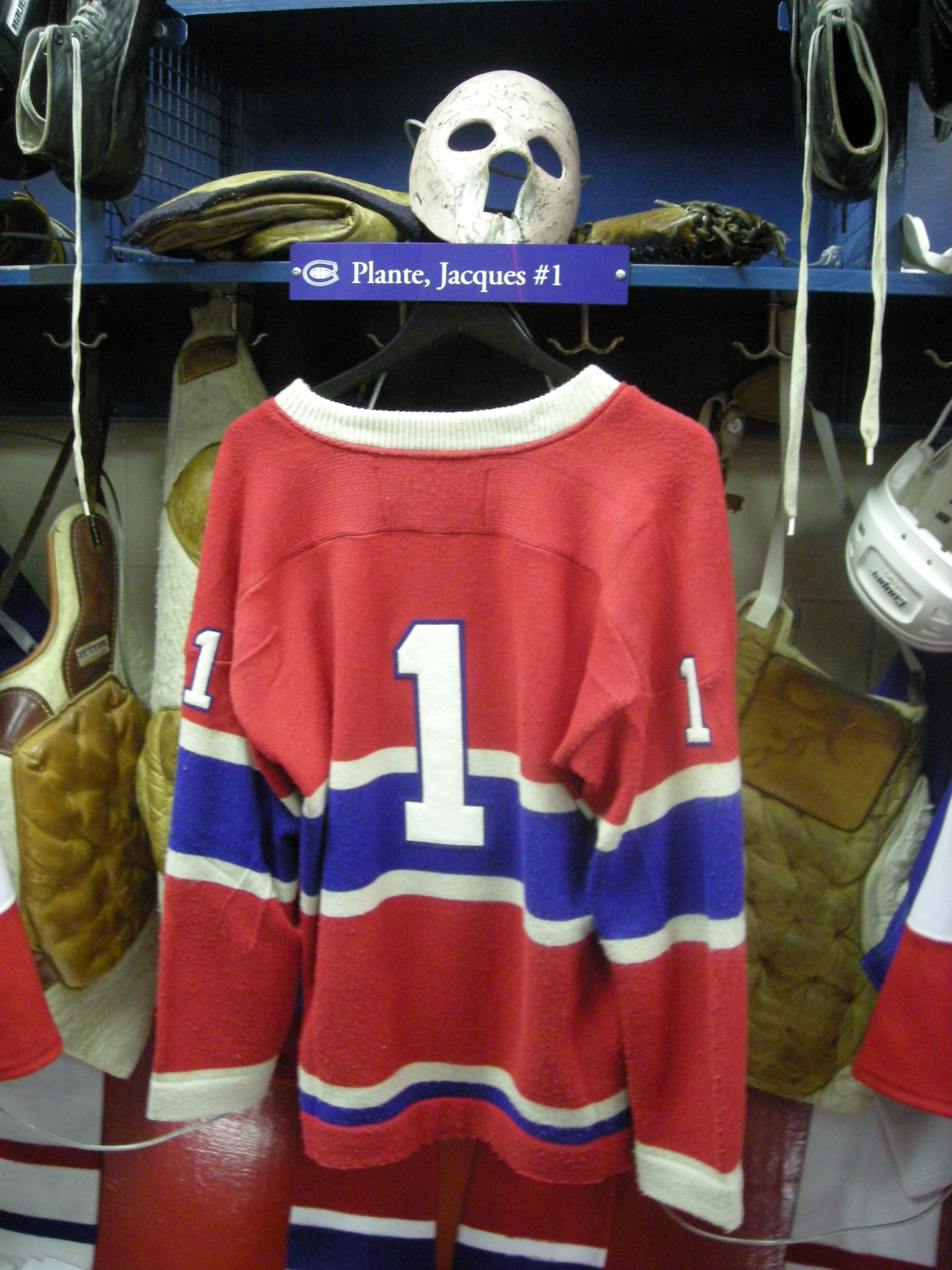
Plante's #1 jersey exhibited at the Hockey Hall of Fame in 2010

Plante was one of the first goaltenders to skate behind the net to stop the puck. He also was one of the first to raise his arm on an icing call to let his defencemen know what was happening. He perfected a stand-up, positional style, cutting down the angles; he became one of the first goaltenders to write a how-to book about the position. He was a pioneer of stickhandling the puck; before that time, goaltenders passively stood in the net and simply deflected pucks to defencemen or backchecking forwards.

Plante was inducted into the Hockey Hall of Fame in 1978, Canada's Sports Hall of Fame in 1981, and into the Quebec Sports Pantheon in 1994. His no. 1 jersey was retired in 1995 by the Montreal Canadiens. The Jacques Plante Memorial Trophy was established in his honour as an award to the top goaltender in the Quebec Major Junior Hockey League. The Jacques Plante Trophy was established in Switzerland after Plante's death; it is given out annually to the top Swiss goaltender. The former arena in Shawinigan, where Plante grew up and played his first organized games, was renamed to Aréna Jacques Plante.

His injury and subsequent donning of a mask were depicted in an installment of Canada's Heritage Minute series. as well as in a children’s book “That’s Not Hockey” written by Andre Poulin and illustrated by Felix Girard, published in 2018 by Annick Press (U.S.) Ltd.

== Career statistics ==
=== Regular season and playoffs ===
			Regular season									Playoffs
Season	Team	League	GP	W	L	T	MIN	GA	SO	GAA	SV%	GP	W	L	MIN	GA	SO	GAA	SV%
1947–48	Montreal Royals	QSHL	2	0	0	2	120	5	0	2.50	—	—	—	—	—	—	—	—	—
1947–48	Quebec Citadelles	QSHL	31	18	11	1	1840	87	2	2.84	—	9	4	5	545	28	2	3.08	—
1948–49	Quebec Citadelles	QSHL	64	42	12	10	3840	119	7	1.86	—	13	7	6	790	43	0	3.27	—
1949–50	Montreal Royals	QSHL	58	27	22	9	3480	180	0	3.10	—	6	2	4	360	20	0	3.00	—
1950–51	Montreal Royals	QSHL	60	28	29	3	3670	201	4	3.29	—	7	2	5	420	26	1	3.71	—
1951–52	Montreal Royals	QSHL	60	30	24	6	3560	201	4	3.39	—	7	3	4	420	21	1	3.00	—
1952–53	Montreal Royals	QSHL	29	20	8	1	1760	61	4	2.08	—	—	—	—	—	—	—	—	—
1952–53	Montreal Canadiens	NHL	3	2	0	1	180	4	0	1.33	—	4	3	1	240	7	1	1.75	—
1952–53	Buffalo Bisons	AHL	33	13	19	1	2000	114	2	3.42	—	—	—	—	—	—	—	—	—
1953–54	Buffalo Bisons	AHL	55	32	17	6	3370	148	3	2.64	—	—	—	—	—	—	—	—	—
1953–54	Montreal Canadiens	NHL	17	7	5	5	1020	27	5	1.59	—	8	5	3	480	15	2	1.88	—
1954–55	Montreal Canadiens	NHL	52	33	12	7	3079	109	5	2.12	—	12	6	3	640	29	0	2.72	.914
1955–56	Montreal Canadiens	NHL	64	42	12	10	3840	119	7	1.86	.930	10	8	2	600	18	2	1.80	.923
1956–57	Montreal Canadiens	NHL	61	31	18	12	3658	122	9	2.00	.920	10	8	2	614	17	1	1.66	936
1957–58	Montreal Canadiens	NHL	57	34	14	8	3386	119	9	2.11	.924	10	8	2	618	20	1	1.94	.936
1958–59	Montreal Canadiens	NHL	67	38	16	13	4000	144	9	2.16	.925	11	8	3	669	26	0	2.33	.908
1959–60	Montreal Canadiens	NHL	69	40	17	12	4140	175	3	2.54	.915	8	8	0	489	11	3	1.35	.950
1960–61	Montreal Royals	EPHL	8	3	4	1	480	24	0	3.00	—	—	—	—	—	—	—	—	—
1960–61	Montreal Canadiens	NHL	40	23	11	6	2400	112	2	2.80	.904	6	2	4	412	16	0	2.33	.910
1961–62	Montreal Canadiens	NHL	70	42	14	14	4200	166	4	2.37	.923	6	2	4	360	19	0	3.17	.904
1962–63	Montreal Canadiens	NHL	56	22	14	19	3320	138	5	2.49	.912	5	1	4	300	14	0	2.80	.899
1963–64	New York Rangers	NHL	65	22	36	7	3898	220	3	3.39	.910	—	—	—	—	—	—	—	—
1964–65	New York Rangers	NHL	33	10	17	5	1938	109	2	3.37	.902	—	—	—	—	—	—	—	—
1964–65	Baltimore Clippers	AHL	17	6	9	1	1018	51	1	3.01	—	5	2	3	315	14	1	2.67	—
1968–69	St. Louis Blues	NHL	37	18	12	6	2138	70	5	1.96	.940	10	8	2	589	14	3	1.43	.950
1969–70	St. Louis Blues	NHL	32	18	9	5	1838	67	5	2.19	.918	6	4	1	323	8	1	1.49	.936
1970–71	Toronto Maple Leafs	NHL	40	24	11	4	2323	73	4	1.89	.944	3	0	2	133	7	0	3.16	.901
1971–72	Toronto Maple Leafs	NHL	34	16	13	5	1962	86	2	2.63	.917	1	0	1	60	5	0	5.00	.828
1972–73	Toronto Maple Leafs	NHL	32	8	14	6	1713	87	1	3.05	.907	—	—	—	—	—	—	—	—
1972–73	Boston Bruins	NHL	8	7	1	0	480	16	2	2.00	.927	2	0	2	120	10	0	5.00	.841
1974–75	Edmonton Oilers	WHA	31	15	14	1	1592	88	1	3.32	.890	—	—	—	—	—	—	—	—
WHA totals			31	15	14	1	1592	88	1	3.32	.890	—	—	—	—	—	—	—	—
NHL totals			837	437	246	145	49,514	1,960	82	2.38	—	112	71	36	6,646	235	14	2.12	—

== Head coaching statistics ==
Team	Season	Regular season						Postseason
Team	Season	G	W	L	T	Pts	Finish	Result
QUE	1973–74	78	38	36	4	80	5th in WHA East	Did not qualify

== Awards and honours ==
Award	Year
NHL
Stanley Cup champion	1953, 1956, 1957, 1958, 1959, 1960
NHL All-Star Game	1956, 1957, 1958, 1959, 1960, 1962, 1969, 1970
NHL First All-Star Team	1956, 1959, 1962
Vezina Trophy	1956, 1957, 1958, 1959, 1960, 1962, 1969^{†}
NHL Second All-Star Team	1957, 1958, 1960, 1971
Hart Memorial Trophy	1962

^{†}Shared with Glenn Hall.

Award	Year
Other
Hockey Hall of Fame	1978
Canada Sports Hall of Fame	1981
World Hockey Association Hall of Fame	2010

== See also ==
- Goaltender mask
- History of the National Hockey League (1942–1967)
- History of the Montreal Canadiens
- List of NHL goaltenders with 300 wins

== Bibliography ==
- O'Brien, Andy with Plante, Jacques (1973) The Jacques Plante Story. Toronto: McGraw Hill. ISBN 0-07-092991-2.
- Denault, Todd (2009) Jacques Plante: The Man Who Changed the Face of Hockey. Toronto: McClelland & Stewart. ISBN 978-0-7710-2633-1
- Plante, Jacques (1972). On goaltending: Fundamentals of hockey netminding by the master of the game. Toronto: Collier MacMillan Canada. ISBN 0-02-081120-9.

- Published 1972 in French as Devant le filet. Toronto: Collier MacMillan Canada. ISBN 0-02-973410-X .
- Both editions reprinted 1997. Montreal: Multimedia Robert Davies. ISBN 1-55207-003-4 (English) and ISBN 2-89462-026-8 (French).

Preceded by Bernie Geoffrion	Winner of the Hart Memorial Trophy; 1962	Succeeded by Gordie Howe
Preceded by Terry Sawchuk; Johnny Bower; Rogatien Vachon and Gump Worsley	Winner of the Vezina Trophy; 1956, 1957, 1958, 1959, 1960; 1962; 1969 with Glenn Hall	Succeeded by Johnny Bower; Glenn Hall; Tony Esposito
Preceded by Position created	General manager of the Quebec Nordiques; 1973–74	Succeeded by Maurice Filion
Preceded by Maurice Filion	Head coach of the Quebec Nordiques; 1973–74	Succeeded by Jean-Guy Gendron
