= Jean Perron =

Canadian ice hockey coach

- Born: October 5, 1946 (age 79); Saint-Isidore-d'Auckland, Quebec, Canada
- Occupations: Ice hockey coach Sports commentator

Jean Perron (born October 5, 1946) is a Canadian ice hockey coach and sports commentator, best known for being the 16th head coach of the Montreal Canadiens, serving from 1985 to 1988. Perron has more recently served as the head coach for Israel's men's national teams.

== Coaching career ==
Perron was born in Saint-Isidore-d'Auckland, now called Saint-Isidore-de-Clifton, Quebec. He was an assistant coach with the National Hockey League's Montreal Canadiens under Jacques Lemaire for one season before being named head coach in 1985. Perron and the Canadiens won the Stanley Cup in his first season in charge, with rookie goaltender Patrick Roy winning the Conn Smythe Trophy as the playoff MVP. After two more successful seasons that included a Prince of Wales Conference Final appearance and an Adams Division title, Perron resigned from the Canadiens on May 17, 1988, with team GM Serge Savard saying Perron told him the pressures of the job were "quite difficult" for his family. The next year, he was hired by the Quebec Nordiques in December 1988 as a temporary midseason replacement after Ron Lapointe was fired. He also served as an assistant coach for Canada at the 1987 Canada Cup.

In 1995, Perron became the head coach and general manager of the International Hockey League's San Francisco Spiders for their only season of existence, followed by a 50-game stint with the Manitoba Moose during the 1996-97 season.

Perron's tough, authoritarian coaching style resulted in tumultuous relationships with several of his players and staff, including a long-standing public feud with former Canadiens player Chris Nilan.

== Post career ==
After his professional coaching career, Perron became a hockey analyst for different media outlets in Quebec and has appeared regularly on TQS's sports talk show 110%. His usage of strange idioms was noted in the media, once being quoted as saying, “We’re finally starting to see the train at the end of the tunnel."

In 2004, Perron was named the coach of the Israel's Under-18 and senior men's national teams. He led both teams to new heights with Israel being promoted to Division I for one year. He left after two seasons but returned in 2011 and led the Under-18 team to an IIHF World U-18 Division II Group B championship in 2013.

== Coaching record ==
=== NHL ===
Team	Year	Regular season						Postseason			
Team	Year	G	W	L	T	Pts	Finish	W	L	Win %	Result
MTL	1985–86	80	40	33	7	87	2nd in Adams	15	5	.750	Won Stanley Cup (CGY)
MTL	1986–87	80	41	29	10	92	2nd in Adams	10	7	.588	Lost in Conference Final (PHI)
MTL	1987–88	80	45	22	13	103	1st in Adams	5	6	.455	Lost in Division finals (BOS)
QUE	1988–89	46	16	25	5	37	5th in Adams	—	—	—	Did not qualify
MTL total	1985–1988	240	126	84	30	282	1 division title	30	18	.625	3 playoff appearances 1 Stanley Cup title
QUE total	1988–1989	46	16	25	5	37	0 division titles	—	—	—	—
NHL totals	1985–1989	286	142	109	35	319	1 division title	30	18	.625	3 playoff appearances 1 Stanley Cup title

=== IHL ===
Team	Year	Regular season						Postseason
Team	Year	G	W	L	OTL	Pts	Finish	Result
San Francisco Spiders	1995–96	82	40	32	10	90	3rd in South	Lost in conference quarter-finals (1-3 vs. CHI)
Manitoba Moose	1996–97	50	16	26	8	40	5th in Midwest	Fired during season
SF totals	1995–1996	82	40	32	8	88	0 division titles	1-3 (0.250)
MB totals	1996–1997	50	16	26	8	40	0 division titles	0-0 (0.000)
IHL totals	1995–1997	132	56	58	16	128	0 division titles	1-3 (0.250)

Sporting positions
Preceded by Jacques Lemaire	Head coach of the Montreal Canadiens; 1985–88	Succeeded by Pat Burns
Preceded by Ron Lapointe	Head coach of the Quebec Nordiques; 1989	Succeeded by Michel Bergeron
Preceded by Frank Serratore (Minnesota Moose)	Head coach of the Manitoba Moose; 1994–1996	Succeeded by Randy Carlyle
