= Ron Lapointe =

Canadian ice hockey coach

Ron Lapointe (November 12, 1949 – March 23, 1992) was a Canadian ice hockey coach.

Lapointe grew up in Verdun, Quebec. He was a product of the junior ice hockey league QMJHL and served as a head coach of the Shawinigan Cataractes. He later worked as an assistant on the staffs of the New York Islanders and Washington Capitals. Lapointe also led the Fredericton Express of the American Hockey League.

He was named interim head coach of the Quebec Nordiques halfway through the 1987–88 NHL season. After an 11–20–2 start in the 1988–89 season, Lapointe was forced to resign because of a kidney tumor. Lapointe then spent two seasons as the coach of the minor league Milwaukee Admirals before health problems forced him to resign. He later took a job as a scout with the Vancouver Canucks.

His total NHL coaching record was 33–50–6. He died at age 42 on March 23, 1992, after a three-year battle with kidney cancer. The Ron Lapointe Trophy is named in his honour, and awarded to the Quebec Major Junior Hockey League's Coach of the Year.

== Coaching record ==
| Team | Year | Regular season | | | | | | Postseason |
| Team | Year | G | W | L | T | Pts | Finish | Result |
|---|---|---|---|---|---|---|---|---|
| Quebec Nordiques | 1987–88 | 56 | 22 | 30 | 4 | 48 | 5th in Adams | Interim head coach |
| Quebec Nordiques | 1988–89 | 34 | 11 | 20 | 2 | 24 | 5th in Adams | Resigned |
| Total | | 90 | 33 | 50 | 6 | 72 | | 0 Stanley Cups (0-0, 0.000) |

| Preceded by André Savard | Head coach of the Quebec Nordiques; 1987–89 | Succeeded by Jean Perron |
