= Dave Chambers =

Canadian ice hockey coach (born 1940)

Biographical details
- Born: May 7, 1940 (age 86); Leaside, Ontario, Canada

Coaching career (HC unless noted)
- 1969–1970: Saskatchewan
- 1970–1972: Ohio State
- 1972–1977: York
- 1977–1978: HC Gherdëina
- 1978–1979: Toronto Marlboros (Assistant)
- 1979–1980: Toronto Marlboros
- 1980–1982: SC Bern
- 1981–1983: Team Italy
- 1984–1987: York
- 1987: Team Italy
- 1988: Canada U20
- 1989–1990: Minnesota North Stars (Assistant)
- 1990–1991: Quebec Nordiques
- 2000–2003: ZSC Lions (Assistant)
- 2003–2005: SC Langnau (Assistant)
- 2006–2008: ZSC Lions (Assistant)
- 2008–2009: SC Rapperswil-Jona Lakers (Assistant)
- 2008–2009: SC Rapperswil-Jona Lakers
- 2010–2011: SC Langenthal (Sr. Advisor)
- 2012–2013: HC Lugano (Assistant)
- 2013–2015: Schwenninger Wild Wings (Assistant)

Head coaching record
- Overall: 44-14-0 (.759) [College]

Dave Chambers (born May 7, 1940) is a Canadian former ice hockey coach. Chambers coached the Quebec Nordiques of the National Hockey League (NHL) from 1990 until 1991.

Born in Leaside, Ontario, Chambers played junior hockey in the Ontario Hockey Association with the Guelph Biltmores and Toronto St. Michael's Majors, university hockey with the University of Toronto and University of British Columbia, and senior hockey before moving on to coaching.

With the early development of the Canadian National team, Chambers coached at the University of Saskatchewan and the University of Guelph before landing a coaching job at Ohio State University for two seasons from 1970 to 1972. He left Ohio State to coach at York University in his native Toronto. He is the winningest coach in Ohio State history by winning percentage and won the CCHA championship in 1972. At York University, his teams won three division championships, three Ontario Championships, and one Canadian championship. His university coaching record over 14 years was 334 wins, 110 losses for a winning percentage of .750 and it included three coach of the year awards. He later took a position behind the bench of the junior league Toronto Marlboros and won the OHL Matt Leyden Trophy coach of the year award in 1980. He was coach of the gold medal-winning Canadian team at the 1988 World Junior Ice Hockey Championships in Moscow. Chambers served as an assistant coach with the Minnesota North Stars and then was the head coach of the Quebec Nordiques from 1990 to 1991 in the NHL.

Chambers was inducted into the Sports Hall of Fame at York University in 2006 and the University of British Columbia in 2012. He has also authored six books and numerous articles on ice hockey, training methods, and coaching. Two of these books, The Hockey Drill Book published by Human Kinetics Pub. and Coaching: the Art and Science published by Firefly Books, have been translated and published by the Russian Sport Federation.

== Head coaching record ==
=== NHL ===
Team	Year	Regular season							Postseason
Team	Year	G	W	L	T	OTL	Pts	Finish	Result
Quebec Nordiques	1990–91	80	16	50	14	-	46	5th in Adams	Missed playoffs
Quebec Nordiques	1991–92	18	3	14	1	-	(52)	5th in Adams	(fired)
Total		98	19	64	15	-	53	0 division titles	(0-0, 0.000) - 0 Stanley Cups

=== OHL ===
Team	Year	Regular season							Postseason
Team	Year	G	W	L	T	OTL	Pts	Finish	Result
Toronto Marlboros	1979–80	68	33	32	3	-	69	2nd in Emms	Lost in division semi-finals (0-4 vs. BFD)

=== College ===
Record table
Season	Team	Overall	Conference	Standing	Postseason
Ohio State Buckeyes Independent (1970–1971)
1970–71	Ohio State	20-9-0			
Ohio State Buckeyes (CCHA) (1971–1972)
1971–72	Ohio State	24-5-0	8-4-0	1st	CCHA Champion
Total:		44-14-0	8-4-0		
National champion Postseason invitational champion Conference regular season champion Conference regular season and conference tournament champion Division regular season champion Division regular season and conference tournament champion Conference tournament champion

Sporting positions
Preceded by Michel Bergeron	Head coach of the Quebec Nordiques; 1990–91	Succeeded by Pierre Pagé
