= Michel Bergeron =

Canadian former ice hockey coach

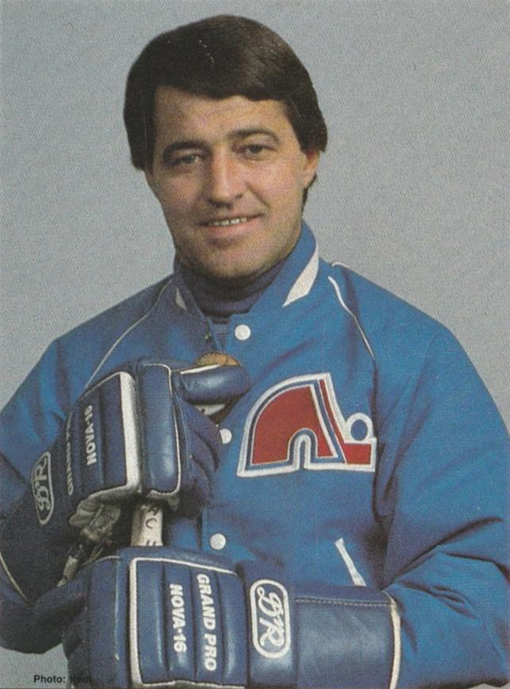
- Born: June 12, 1946 (age 79); Montreal, Quebec
- Occupation: Ice hockey coach

Michel Bergeron (born June 12, 1946) is a Canadian former ice hockey coach.

== Coaching career ==
Bergeron began his coaching career behind the bench of a midget team from Rosemont, Quebec. During his second season, he led the team to a national championship. He then took over for the Trois-Rivieres Draveurs of the QMJHL, leading the team to two Memorial Cup appearances.

In 1980, Bergeron became an assistant coach for the Quebec Nordiques. Six games into the season, with the Nordiques sputtering to a 1-3-2 start, general manager and head coach Maurice Filion dropped his head coach's title and named Bergeron his successor. Bergeron remained head coach until 1987. His teams gained a reputation for playing a high scoring, quick paced game. As coach, Bergeron also devoted significant time to pursuing European players, adding the Stastny brothers after their defection from Czechoslovakia. His teams reached the postseason in each of seven years behind the Quebec bench, including two trips to the Wales Conference Finals.

Just before the 1987 draft, Bergeron was traded to the New York Rangers for a first-round draft pick and $75,000, which was the first time a coach was traded in NHL history. In spite of on-ice achievements, Bergeron's relationship with the Nordiques front office had become rather strained in recent years. Nonetheless, his reputation as a strong motivator enticed the Rangers, who were seeking coaching stability. Bergeron was the franchise's 13th head coach in 12 years.

Bergeron's first season in New York saw the Rangers in a battle with the upstart and rival, New Jersey Devils, for the final playoff spot in the Patrick Division. A tie with the Winnipeg Jets in the second-to-last game of the season left the Rangers and Devils tied with 80 points each. However, the Devils had one more win, meaning that if both teams won their final game, the Devils would advance on the total wins tiebreaker. On the final day of the season, the Rangers easily defeated Bergeron's old team, the Nordiques, 3–0. Hours later, the Devils defeated the Chicago Blackhawks in overtime, 4–3. The Devils went to the playoffs, and the Rangers went home.

With two games remaining in the 1988–89 NHL season, general manager Phil Esposito fired Bergeron and named himself head coach for the remainder of the season. Even though the Rangers had secured a playoff spot, Bergeron had drawn the ire of Esposito by vocally requesting a contract extension; Esposito stating that the firing was rooted in "philosophical differences."

Bergeron returned to Quebec during the 1989–90 NHL season, presiding over a ghastly 12-win season that is still the worst in Nordiques/Avalanche franchise history (both NHL and WHA). He was fired after the season. His 265 wins over two stints were the most in franchise history until current Avs coach Jared Bednar passed him in 2023. Due in part to the 1989-90 debacle, he still owns the most career losses in franchise history.

In December 1990, he was treated for a mild heart attack.

== Legacy ==
Bergeron earned the nicknames of "Le Tigre" ("The Tiger") and "Napoleon", in reference to his fiery temper, small stature, and French lineage. Bergeron reportedly even got under the nerves of Cuban leader Fidel Castro; in 1964, Bergeron was the catcher on a travelling Canadian baseball team, and, despite the tradition of visiting teams showing deference to the Cuban executive during his appearances in games, Bergeron cut down Castro as he attempted to score.

== Broadcasting career ==
Bergeron served as panelist on the popular French talkshow "l'antichambre" which is broadcast on RDS. He spent 6 years with RDS and he was nicknamed "le capitaine" on the talkshow. Bergeron quit RDS for TVA Sports on December 19, 2013. He is a panelist before and during games when TVA broadcasts NHL hockey. TVA Sports recently acquired the rights to broadcast 20 regular season Montreal Canadiens games in French.

In 2021 he was a competitor on Chanteurs masqués, the Quebec adaptation of the Masked Singer franchise. He sang Frank Sinatra's "New York, New York" in costume as a whitecoat seal, but was the first person eliminated from the competition.

== Coaching record ==
=== NHL ===
Team	Year	Regular season							Postseason		
Team	Year	G	W	L	T	Pts	Finish	W	L	Win%	Result
QUE	1980–81	74	29	29	16	(78)	4th in Adams	2	3	.400	Lost in Preliminary round (PHI)
QUE	1981–82	80	33	31	16	82	4th in Adams	7	9	.438	Lost in Conference finals (NYI)
QUE	1982–83	80	34	34	12	80	4th in Adams	1	3	.250	Lost in Division semifinals (BOS)
QUE	1983–84	80	42	28	10	94	3rd in Adams	5	4	.556	Lost in Division finals (MTL)
QUE	1984–85	80	41	30	9	91	2nd in Adams	9	9	.500	Lost in Conference finals (PHI)
QUE	1985–86	80	43	31	6	92	1st in Adams	0	3	.000	Lost in Division semifinals (HFD)
QUE	1986–87	80	31	39	10	72	4th in Adams	7	6	.538	Lost in Division finals (MTL)
NYR	1987–88	80	36	34	10	82	5th in Patrick	—	—	—	Missed playoffs
NYR	1988–89	78	37	33	8	(82)	(fired)	—	—	—	—
QUE	1989–90	80	12	61	7	31	5th in Adams	—	—	—	Missed playoffs
QUE Total		634	265	283	86	616	1 Divisional Title	31	37	.456	
NYR Total		158	73	67	18	164	0 Divisional Titles				
Total		792	338	350	104	780	1 Divisional Title				

=== QMJHL ===
Team	Year	Regular season							Post season
Team	Year	G	W	L	T	OTL	Pts	Finish	Result
Trois-Rivières Draveurs	1975–76	72	36	31	5	—	77	2nd in East	Won in quarter-finals (4–1 vs. CHI); Lost in semi-finals (1–4 vs. SHE)
Trois-Rivières Draveurs	1976–77	72	38	24	10	—	86	3rd in Dilio	Lost in quarter-finals (2–4 vs. COR)
Trois-Rivières Draveurs	1977–78	72	47	18	7	—	101	1st in Dilio	Won in quarter-finals (4–0 vs. QUE); Won in semi-finals (4–1 vs. SHE); Won President's Cup (4–0 vs. MTL); Finished in 3rd at Memorial Cup (1–3)
Trois-Rivières Draveurs	1978–79	72	58	8	6	—	122	1st in Dilio	Won in quarter-finals (4–0 vs. SHA); Won in semi-finals (4–1 vs. MTL); Won President's Cup (4–0 vs. SHE); Finished in 3rd at Memorial Cup (2–2)
Trois-Rivières Draveurs	1979–80	72	36	27	9	—	81	4th in Dilio	Lost in quarter-finals (3–4 vs. CHI)
Total		360	215	108	37	—	467	2 Divisional titles	2 President's Cups - 34–15 (0.694) 0 Memorial Cups - 3–5 (0.375)

Preceded by Maurice Filion; Jean Perron	Head coach of the Quebec Nordiques; 1980–87; 1989–90	Succeeded by Andre Savard; Dave Chambers
Preceded by Phil Esposito	Head coach of the New York Rangers; 1987–89	Succeeded by Phil Esposito
