= 1988–89 NHL season =

National Hockey League season

- League: National Hockey League
- Sport: Ice hockey
- Duration: October 6, 1988 – May 25, 1989
- Games: 80
- Teams: 21
- TV partner(s): CBC, TSN, SRC (Canada); SportsChannel America (United States)

Draft
- Top draft pick: Mike Modano
- Picked by: Minnesota North Stars

Regular season
- Presidents' Trophy: Calgary Flames
- Season MVP: Wayne Gretzky (Kings)
- Top scorer: Mario Lemieux (Penguins)

Playoffs
- Playoffs MVP: Al MacInnis (Flames)

Stanley Cup
- Champions: Calgary Flames
- Runners-up: Montreal Canadiens

NHL seasons
- 1987–88 1989–90

The 1988–89 NHL season was the 72nd season of the National Hockey League. Calgary Flames won an all-Canadian Stanley Cup Final against Montreal Canadiens four games to two. This remains the last time two Canadian teams faced each other for the Stanley Cup.

== Entry draft ==
The 1988 NHL entry draft was held on June 11, at the Montreal Forum in Montreal, Quebec. Mike Modano was selected first overall by the Minnesota North Stars.

== Arena changes ==
The Los Angeles Kings' home arena, The Forum, became the first NHL arena to sell its naming rights, becoming the Great Western Forum as part of a deal with Great Western Savings & Loan that the team announced on December 5, 1988. Although the St. Louis Blues' home arena was named the Checkerdome from 1977 to 1983, Ralston Purina owned both the Blues and their arena during that time.

== Regular season ==
This year saw the start of Wayne Gretzky's tenure with the Los Angeles Kings, having been traded in the off-season after leading the Edmonton Oilers to the 1988 Stanley Cup. Coinciding with Gretzky's acquisition, the team also changed its uniforms and colours for 1988–89, scrapping the purple and gold associated with its co-tenant at the Great Western Forum, the NBA's Los Angeles Lakers, in favour of black and silver. Gretzky's presence signaled a dramatic on-ice turnaround for the Kings. Prior to his arrival via trade with the Edmonton Oilers on August 9, 1988, Los Angeles had the fourth-worst record in the NHL at 30 wins, 42 losses, and 8 ties. After Gretzky's first season with the Kings, however, they moved all the way up to fourth-best in the NHL, with a record of 42 wins, 31 losses, and 7 ties for 91 points. They also managed to defeat Gretzky's former team, the Oilers, in seven games in the Smythe Division semifinals before falling victim to a four-game sweep at the hands of the eventual Cup champion Flames in the division finals.

Four years after Andy Van Hellemond became the first on-ice official to wear a helmet, the NHL also made helmets mandatory for its officials like it did with its players in 1979; like the ruling for players, any official that was not wearing a helmet before the ruling could also go helmetless if they so desired.

Mario Lemieux of the Pittsburgh Penguins won the Art Ross Trophy for the second consecutive season, leading the league with 199 points and recording all three of his eight point games in his career, with one of them happening during the playoffs. Lemieux remains the only player other than Gretzky to approach the 200 point plateau (Gretzky surpassed the 200 point mark four times in five years during the 1980s). This was the only season that there were four players that scored 150 or more points; Gretzky tallied 168, while Steve Yzerman and Bernie Nicholls totalled 155 and 150 points, respectively. This was also the only time that two teammates, Gretzky and Nicholls of the Los Angeles Kings, had hit the 150 point mark. Narrowly edging out Lemieux, Gretzky won his ninth Hart Memorial Trophy as the league's MVP, while Yzerman finished third in the balloting. Yzerman was voted by his fellow players as the NHLPA MVP, taking the Lester B. Pearson Award.

New York Rangers rookie Brian Leetch broke the record for goals by a rookie defenceman with 23. He finished that season with 71 points and easily captured the Calder Memorial Trophy.

On March 22, an incident took place in Buffalo during a game between the Buffalo Sabres and the St. Louis Blues. During a goalmouth collision between the Blues' Steve Tuttle and the Sabres' Uwe Krupp, Tuttle's skate blade slashed the throat of Buffalo goaltender Clint Malarchuk, severing the latter's jugular vein. Thanks to some timely action by Sabres trainer and former US Army Vietnam War veteran Jim Pizzutelli, Malarchuk quickly received treatment and was released from the hospital the next day. He returned to action 10 days later.

This was the first season that every NHL arena had full rink board advertisements.

=== Final standings ===
Note: W = Wins, L = Losses, T = Ties, GF= Goals For, GA = Goals Against, Pts = Points

==== Prince of Wales Conference ====
Adams Division
	GP	W	L	T	GF	GA	Pts
Montreal Canadiens	80	53	18	9	315	218	115
Boston Bruins	80	37	29	14	289	256	88
Buffalo Sabres	80	38	35	7	291	299	83
Hartford Whalers	80	37	38	5	299	290	79
Quebec Nordiques	80	27	46	7	269	342	61

Patrick Division
	GP	W	L	T	GF	GA	Pts
Washington Capitals	80	41	29	10	305	259	92
Pittsburgh Penguins	80	40	33	7	347	349	87
New York Rangers	80	37	35	8	310	307	82
Philadelphia Flyers	80	36	36	8	307	285	80
New Jersey Devils	80	27	41	12	281	325	66
New York Islanders	80	28	47	5	265	325	61

==== Clarence Campbell Conference ====
Norris Division
	GP	W	L	T	GF	GA	Pts
Detroit Red Wings	80	34	34	12	313	316	80
St. Louis Blues	80	33	35	12	275	285	78
Minnesota North Stars	80	27	37	16	258	278	70
Chicago Blackhawks	80	27	41	12	297	335	66
Toronto Maple Leafs	80	28	46	6	259	342	62

Smythe Division
	GP	W	L	T	GF	GA	Pts
Calgary Flames	80	54	17	9	354	226	117
Los Angeles Kings	80	42	31	7	376	335	91
Edmonton Oilers	80	38	34	8	325	306	84
Vancouver Canucks	80	33	39	8	251	253	74
Winnipeg Jets	80	26	42	12	300	355	64

== Playoffs ==
=== Bracket ===
The top four teams in each division qualified for the playoffs. In each round, teams competed in a best-of-seven series (scores in the bracket indicate the number of games won in each best-of-seven series). In the division semifinals, the fourth seeded team in each division played against the division winner from their division. The other series matched the second and third place teams from the divisions. The two winning teams from each division's semifinals then met in the division finals. The two division winners of each conference then played in the conference finals. The two conference winners then advanced to the Stanley Cup Final.

Division semifinals	Division finals
A1	Montreal	4
A4	Hartford	0
A1	Montreal	4
A2	Boston	1
A2	Boston	4
A3	Buffalo	1
Prince of Wales Conference
P1	Washington	2
P4	Philadelphia	4
P4	Philadelphia	4
P2	Pittsburgh	3
P2	Pittsburgh	4
P3	NY Rangers	0
N1	Detroit	2
N4	Chicago	4
N4	Chicago	4
N2	St. Louis	1
N2	St. Louis	4
N3	Minnesota	1
Clarence Campbell Conference
S1	Calgary	4
S4	Vancouver	3
S1	Calgary	4
S2	Los Angeles	0
S2	Los Angeles	4
S3	Edmonton	3

Conference finals
A1	Montreal	4
P4	Philadelphia	2
N4	Chicago	1
S1	Calgary	4

Stanley Cup Final
A1	Montreal	2
S1	Calgary	4

== Awards ==
Presidents' Trophy:	Calgary Flames
Prince of Wales Trophy: (Wales Conference playoff champion)	Montreal Canadiens
Clarence S. Campbell Bowl: (Campbell Conference playoff champion)	Calgary Flames
Art Ross Trophy:	Mario Lemieux, Pittsburgh Penguins
Bill Masterton Memorial Trophy:	Tim Kerr, Philadelphia Flyers
Calder Memorial Trophy:	Brian Leetch, New York Rangers
Conn Smythe Trophy:	Al MacInnis, Calgary Flames
Frank J. Selke Trophy:	Guy Carbonneau, Montreal Canadiens
Hart Memorial Trophy:	Wayne Gretzky, Los Angeles Kings
Jack Adams Award:	Pat Burns, Montreal Canadiens
James Norris Memorial Trophy:	Chris Chelios, Montreal Canadiens
King Clancy Memorial Trophy:	Bryan Trottier, New York Islanders
Lady Byng Memorial Trophy:	Joe Mullen, Calgary Flames
Lester B. Pearson Award:	Steve Yzerman, Detroit Red Wings
NHL Plus/Minus Award:	Joe Mullen, Calgary Flames,
William M. Jennings Trophy:	Patrick Roy/Brian Hayward, Montreal Canadiens
Vezina Trophy:	Patrick Roy, Montreal Canadiens

=== All-Star teams ===
First team	Position	Second team
Patrick Roy, Montreal Canadiens	G	Mike Vernon, Calgary Flames
Chris Chelios, Montreal Canadiens	D	Al MacInnis, Calgary Flames
Paul Coffey, Pittsburgh Penguins	D	Ray Bourque, Boston Bruins
Mario Lemieux, Pittsburgh Penguins	C	Wayne Gretzky, Los Angeles Kings
Joe Mullen, Calgary Flames	RW	Jari Kurri, Edmonton Oilers
Luc Robitaille, Los Angeles Kings	LW	Gerard Gallant, Detroit Red Wings

== Player statistics ==
=== Scoring leaders ===
Note: GP = Games played; G = Goals; A = Assists; Pts = Points, PIM = Penalties in minutes, PPG = Powerplay Goals, SHG = Shorthanded Goals, GWG = Game Winning Goals

Player	Team	GP	G	A	Pts	PIM	+/-	PPG	SHG	GWG
Mario Lemieux	Pittsburgh Penguins	76	85	114	199	100	+41	31	13	8
Wayne Gretzky	Los Angeles Kings	78	54	114	168	26	+15	11	5	5
Steve Yzerman	Detroit Red Wings	80	65	90	155	61	+17	17	3	7
Bernie Nicholls	Los Angeles Kings	79	70	80	150	96	+30	21	8	6
Rob Brown	Pittsburgh Penguins	68	49	66	115	118	+27	24	0	6
Paul Coffey	Pittsburgh Penguins	75	30	83	113	195	−10	11	0	2
Joe Mullen	Calgary Flames	79	51	59	110	16	+51	13	1	7
Jari Kurri	Edmonton Oilers	76	44	58	102	69	+19	10	5	8
Jimmy Carson	Edmonton Oilers	80	49	51	100	36	+3	19	0	5
Luc Robitaille	Los Angeles Kings	78	46	52	98	65	+5	10	0	4

Source: NHL.

=== Leading goaltenders ===
GP = Games played; Min = Minutes played; W = Wins; L = Losses; T = Ties; SO = Shutouts; GAA = Goals against average; Sv% = Save percentage

Player	Team	GP	Min	W	L	T	SO	GAA	Sv%
Patrick Roy	Montreal Canadiens	48	2743	33	5	6	4	2.47	.908
Mike Vernon	Calgary Flames	52	2938	37	6	5	0	2.65	.897
Reggie Lemelin	Boston Bruins	40	2392	19	15	6	0	3.01	.887
Peter Sidorkiewicz	Hartford Whalers	44	2635	22	18	4	4	3.03	.890
Jon Casey	Minnesota North Stars	55	2961	18	17	12	1	3.06	.900
Kirk McLean	Vancouver Canucks	42	2477	20	17	3	4	3.08	.891
Andy Moog	Boston Bruins	41	2482	18	14	8	1	3.22	.877
Ron Hextall	Philadelphia Flyers	64	3756	30	28	6	0	3.23	.891
Clint Malarchuk	Washington Capitals/Buffalo Sabres	49	2754	19	19	8	2	3.36	.880
Greg Millen	St. Louis Blues	52	3019	22	20	7	6	3.38	.880

Source: Quanthockey.com.

== Coaches ==
=== Patrick Division ===
- New Jersey Devils: Jim Schoenfeld
- New York Islanders: Al Arbour
- New York Rangers: Michel Bergeron and Phil Esposito
- Philadelphia Flyers: Paul Holmgren
- Pittsburgh Penguins: Gene Ubriaco
- Washington Capitals: Bryan Murray

=== Adams Division ===
- Boston Bruins: Terry O'Reilly
- Buffalo Sabres: Ted Sator
- Hartford Whalers: Larry Pleau
- Montreal Canadiens: Pat Burns
- Quebec Nordiques: Ron Lapointe and Jean Perron

=== Norris Division ===
- Chicago Blackhawks: Mike Keenan
- Detroit Red Wings: Jacques Demers
- Minnesota North Stars: Pierre Page
- St. Louis Blues: Brian Sutter
- Toronto Maple Leafs: John Brophy and George Armstrong

=== Smythe Division ===
- Calgary Flames: Terry Crisp
- Edmonton Oilers: Glen Sather
- Los Angeles Kings: Robbie Ftorek
- Vancouver Canucks: Bob McCammon
- Winnipeg Jets: Dan Maloney

== Milestones ==
=== Debuts ===
The following is a list of players of note who played their first NHL game in 1988–89 (listed with their first team, asterisk(*) marks debut in playoffs):

- Don Sweeney, Boston Bruins
- Stephane Quintal, Boston Bruins
- Sergei Pryakhin, Calgary Flames
- Paul Ranheim, Calgary Flames
- Theoren Fleury, Calgary Flames
- Ed Belfour, Chicago Blackhawks
- Jeremy Roenick, Chicago Blackhawks
- Randy McKay, Detroit Red Wings
- Tim Cheveldae, Detroit Red Wings
- Martin Gelinas, Edmonton Oilers
- Mike Modano*, Minnesota North Stars
- Eric Desjardins, Montreal Canadiens
- Jyrki Lumme, Montreal Canadiens
- Mike Keane, Montreal Canadiens
- Eric Weinrich, New Jersey Devils
- Paul Ysebaert, New Jersey Devils
- Tom Fitzgerald, New York Islanders
- Tony Granato, New York Rangers
- Mike Richter*, New York Rangers
- John Cullen, Pittsburgh Penguins
- Mark Recchi, Pittsburgh Penguins
- Curtis Leschyshyn, Quebec Nordiques
- Joe Sakic, Quebec Nordiques
- Rod Brind'Amour*, St. Louis Blues
- Trevor Linden, Vancouver Canucks
- Bob Essensa, Winnipeg Jets

=== Last games ===
The following is a list of players of note that played their last game in the NHL in 1988–89 (listed with their last team):

- Mark Napier, Buffalo Sabres
- Hakan Loob, Calgary Flames
- Lanny McDonald, Calgary Flames
- Doug Halward, Edmonton Oilers
- Tomas Jonsson, Edmonton Oilers
- John Anderson, Hartford Whalers
- Ron Duguay, Los Angeles Kings
- Craig Hartsburg, Minnesota North Stars
- Dennis Maruk, Minnesota North Stars (The last active player to have been a member of the California Golden Seals/Cleveland Barons franchise.)
- Bob Gainey, Montreal Canadiens
- Billy Smith, New York Islanders
- Marcel Dionne, New York Rangers
- Anton Stastny, Quebec Nordiques
- Mel Bridgman, Vancouver Canucks
- Bengt Gustafsson, Washington Capitals

=== Firsts ===
Ron Hextall, Philadelphia Flyers, First goaltender to score a goal in post-season.

== Broadcasting ==
This was the first season of the league's new Canadian national broadcast rights deals with TSN and Hockey Night in Canada on CBC. Saturday night regular season games continued to air on CBC, while TSN televised selected weeknight games. Coverage of the Stanley Cup playoffs was primarily on CBC, with TSN airing first round all-U.S. series.

This was also the first season of the league's new U.S. national broadcast rights deal SportsChannel America. While SportsChannel America agreed to pay more than double what previous rightsholder ESPN paid for the previous three years, SportsChannel America was only available in a few major markets. Notably absent though were the Detroit, Pittsburgh, and St. Louis markets. In this first year of the deal alone, SportsChannel America was available in only 7 million homes when compared to ESPN's reach of 50 million. Whereas the previous deal with ESPN called for up to 33 games per regular season and only one nationally televised game a week, SportsChannel America televised 80–100 games and up to three nights a week.

== See also ==
- List of Stanley Cup champions
- 1988 NHL entry draft
- 1988 NHL supplemental draft
- 1988–89 NHL transactions
- 40th National Hockey League All-Star Game
- National Hockey League All-Star Game
- NHL All-Rookie Team
- 1988 in sports
- 1989 in sports
