= 1991–92 Quebec Nordiques season =

National Hockey League team season

1991–92 Quebec Nordiques
- Division: 5th Adams
- Conference: 11th Wales
- 1991–92 record: 20–48–12
- Home record: 18–19–3
- Road record: 2–29–9
- Goals for: 255
- Goals against: 318

Team information
- General manager: Pierre Page
- Coach: Dave Chambers; Pierre Page
- Captain: Mike Hough
- Alternate captains: Steven Finn; Joe Sakic
- Arena: Colisée de Québec

Team leaders
- Goals: Owen Nolan (42)
- Assists: Joe Sakic (65)
- Points: Joe Sakic (94)
- Penalty minutes: Steven Finn (194)
- Plus/minus: Mikhail Tatarinov (+8)
- Wins: Stephane Fiset (7)
- Goals against average: John Tanner (3.47)

The 1991–92 Quebec Nordiques season was the Nordiques 13th season in the National Hockey League (NHL).

== Off-season ==
Quebec once again had the first overall draft pick heading into the 1991 NHL entry draft, as this marked the third consecutive season the Nordiques had the first overall selection. With the pick, Quebec selected Eric Lindros of the Oshawa Generals. Lindros scored 71 goals and 149 points with the Generals during the 1990–91 season, however, he let the Nordiques know that he was not interested in playing for Quebec. Despite this, the Nordiques drafted him, however, the club was unable to sign Lindros. Rather than playing for Quebec for the 1991–92 season, Lindros played for the Canadian national men's hockey team, and then returned to the Generals for the rest of the season.

The Nordiques did make a big signing, as they signed Russian hockey player Valeri Kamensky to a four-year contract to bring him to North America. Kamensky had played with CSKA Moscow since 1985, and had represented the Soviet Union at the 1988 Winter Olympics, winning a gold medal. In 1990–91 with CSKA, Kamensky 20 goals and 46 points in 46 games.

Quebec made a couple of free agent signings, as Doug Smail joined the team from the Minnesota North Stars. Smail split the 1990–91 season between the North Stars and Winnipeg Jets, scoring eight goals and 23 points in 72 games. The Nordiques also signed tough guy John Kordic from the Washington Capitals. Kordic appeared in only ten games during the 1990–91 season, splitting time between the Capitals and Toronto Maple Leafs, as he had no points, however, he recorded 110 penalty minutes.

The team named Mike Hough the captain, replacing Steven Finn and Joe Sakic who were co-captains of the club in the 1990–91 season.

== Regular season ==
After winning their season opener against the Hartford Whalers, Quebec would endure a nine-game winless streak, and quickly fell into last place in the Adams Division with a 1–8–1 record. The team would eventually fall to 3–14–1, and head coach Dave Chambers was relieved of his duties, as general manager Pierre Page took over the coaching duties.

Under Page, the losses would continue to pile up, however, the team did have a five-game unbeaten streak in early December, as they went 4–0–1 during that span. However, the team did go through some very bad losing streaks, as the club went 1–16–2 during a nineteen-game span in January and February, and fell out of the playoff race. The club finished the year with a 20–48–12 record, earning 52 points, which was a six-point improvement from the previous season. The 52 points was the highest total by Quebec since they had 61 points in the 1988–89 season. Also, for the first time since 1987–88, the Nordiques did not finish in last place in the overall standings, as they had 13 more points than the expansion San Jose Sharks.

Joe Sakic had another impressive season, scoring 29 goals and 94 points in 69 games, to lead the team in points. Owen Nolan had a breakout season, scoring a team high 42 goals, while earning 73 points. Mats Sundin also saw improvement in point totals, finishing with 33 goals and 76 points in his second NHL season. Greg Paslawski had a surprising season, scoring 28 goals and 45 points for the team.

On defence, Mikhail Tatarinov, who came over to the Nordiques from the Washington Capitals in the off-season, led the team with 11 goals and 38 points. Alexei Gusarov was steady on the blueline, earning 23 points, while Curtis Leschyshyn had 17 points despite missing 38 games due to injuries.

In goal, Ron Tugnutt played the most, as he appeared in 30 games, earning six wins with a GAA of 4.02. Stephane Fiset led the club with seven victories, and had a 3.76 GAA. Jacques Cloutier had six wins and a 3.93 GAA, while John Tanner had a club best 3.47 GAA, however, he had only one victory in fourteen games.

=== Final standings ===
Adams Division
	GP	W	L	T	GF	GA	Pts
Montreal Canadiens	80	41	28	11	267	207	93
Boston Bruins	80	36	32	12	270	275	84
Buffalo Sabres	80	31	37	12	289	299	74
Hartford Whalers	80	26	41	13	247	283	65
Quebec Nordiques	80	20	48	12	255	318	52

== Schedule and results ==
1991–92 regular season
October

Game	Result	Date	Score	Opponent	Record
1	W	October 5, 1991	4–2	Hartford Whalers (1991–92)	1–0–0
2	L	October 8, 1991	5–6	@ New Jersey Devils (1991–92)	1–1–0
3	L	October 10, 1991	2–3	@ Minnesota North Stars (1991–92)	1–2–0
4	L	October 12, 1991	4–5	Buffalo Sabres (1991–92)	1–3–0
5	T	October 13, 1991	1–1 OT	New York Islanders (1991–92)	1–3–1
6	L	October 17, 1991	3–5	@ Philadelphia Flyers (1991–92)	1–4–1
7	L	October 19, 1991	1–6	Detroit Red Wings (1991–92)	1–5–1
8	L	October 23, 1991	2–3 OT	@ Montreal Canadiens (1991–92)	1–6–1
9	L	October 24, 1991	0–5	Montreal Canadiens (1991–92)	1–7–1
10	L	October 26, 1991	3–5	New York Rangers (1991–92)	1–8–1
11	W	October 29, 1991	7–2	Winnipeg Jets (1991–92)	2–8–1
12	L	October 31, 1991	4–5	@ New York Rangers (1991–92)	2–9–1

November

Game	Result	Date	Score	Opponent	Record
13	W	November 2, 1991	6–3	San Jose Sharks (1991–92)	3–9–1
14	L	November 7, 1991	2–4	@ Chicago Blackhawks (1991–92)	3–10–1
15	L	November 10, 1991	3–10	Washington Capitals (1991–92)	3–11–1
16	L	November 12, 1991	4–5	@ Hartford Whalers (1991–92)	3–12–1
17	L	November 14, 1991	2–5	@ Boston Bruins (1991–92)	3–13–1
18	L	November 16, 1991	2–6	Edmonton Oilers (1991–92)	3–14–1
19	L	November 18, 1991	3–7	Pittsburgh Penguins (1991–92)	3–15–1
20	W	November 21, 1991	5–2	Montreal Canadiens (1991–92)	4–15–1
21	L	November 23, 1991	3–5	@ Montreal Canadiens (1991–92)	4–16–1
22	W	November 25, 1991	5–2	Hartford Whalers (1991–92)	5–16–1
23	T	November 27, 1991	4–4 OT	@ Buffalo Sabres (1991–92)	5–16–2
24	L	November 28, 1991	2–5	@ St. Louis Blues (1991–92)	5–17–2
25	W	November 30, 1991	4–3	Buffalo Sabres (1991–92)	6–17–2

December

Game	Result	Date	Score	Opponent	Record
26	W	December 3, 1991	3–0	Vancouver Canucks (1991–92)	7–17–2
27	T	December 5, 1991	2–2 OT	@ Boston Bruins (1991–92)	7–17–3
28	W	December 7, 1991	7–5	Los Angeles Kings (1991–92)	8–17–3
29	W	December 10, 1991	5–2	Boston Bruins (1991–92)	9–17–3
30	L	December 12, 1991	1–4	@ Detroit Red Wings (1991–92)	9–18–3
31	L	December 14, 1991	2–4	St. Louis Blues (1991–92)	9–19–3
32	L	December 17, 1991	1–3	@ Washington Capitals (1991–92)	9–20–3
33	T	December 19, 1991	5–5 OT	@ Calgary Flames (1991–92)	9–20–4
34	L	December 21, 1991	1–4	@ San Jose Sharks (1991–92)	9–21–4
35	T	December 22, 1991	6–6 OT	@ Vancouver Canucks (1991–92)	9–21–5
36	L	December 26, 1991	1–4	Montreal Canadiens (1991–92)	9–22–5
37	W	December 28, 1991	4–1	Hartford Whalers (1991–92)	10–22–5
38	W	December 30, 1991	5–2	Toronto Maple Leafs (1991–92)	11–22–5

January

Game	Result	Date	Score	Opponent	Record
39	L	January 2, 1992	1–4	@ Hartford Whalers (1991–92)	11–23–5
40	L	January 4, 1992	2–5	@ New York Islanders (1991–92)	11–24–5
41	L	January 8, 1992	2–4	@ Buffalo Sabres (1991–92)	11–25–5
42	L	January 9, 1992	4–5	@ Boston Bruins (1991–92)	11–26–5
43	L	January 11, 1992	2–7	New York Rangers (1991–92)	11–27–5
44	L	January 14, 1992	3–5	Calgary Flames (1991–92)	11–28–5
45	L	January 21, 1992	3–5	Vancouver Canucks (1991–92)	11–29–5
46	L	January 23, 1992	2–4	@ Chicago Blackhawks (1991–92)	11–30–5
47	W	January 25, 1992	2–1	Winnipeg Jets (1991–92)	12–30–5
48	L	January 28, 1992	2–4	Boston Bruins (1991–92)	12–31–5
49	L	January 29, 1992	2–5	@ Toronto Maple Leafs (1991–92)	12–32–5
50	T	January 31, 1992	4–4 OT	@ Winnipeg Jets (1991–92)	12–32–6

February

Game	Result	Date	Score	Opponent	Record
51	L	February 2, 1992	2–8	@ Edmonton Oilers (1991–92)	12–33–6
52	L	February 5, 1992	3–5	@ Calgary Flames (1991–92)	12–34–6
53	L	February 8, 1992	0–3	Philadelphia Flyers (1991–92)	12–35–6
54	L	February 9, 1992	1–2	New Jersey Devils (1991–92)	12–36–6
55	L	February 11, 1992	3–4	Washington Capitals (1991–92)	12–37–6
56	L	February 13, 1992	2–3	@ Philadelphia Flyers (1991–92)	12–38–6
57	T	February 15, 1992	4–4 OT	@ Montreal Canadiens (1991–92)	12–38–7
58	W	February 18, 1992	4–0	Minnesota North Stars (1991–92)	13–38–7
59	T	February 20, 1992	4–4 OT	@ Pittsburgh Penguins (1991–92)	13–38–8
60	L	February 22, 1992	0–4	@ Hartford Whalers (1991–92)	13–39–8
61	T	February 23, 1992	3–3 OT	@ Montreal Canadiens (1991–92)	13–39–9
62	L	February 26, 1992	4–7	@ San Jose Sharks (1991–92)	13–40–9
63	L	February 27, 1992	2–4	@ Los Angeles Kings (1991–92)	13–41–9

March

Game	Result	Date	Score	Opponent	Record
64	T	March 3, 1992	4–4 OT	Buffalo Sabres (1991–92)	13–41–10
65	W	March 5, 1992	10–4	@ Hartford Whalers (1991–92)	14–41–10
66	T	March 7, 1992	4–4 OT	Detroit Red Wings (1991–92)	14–41–11
67	W	March 9, 1992	2–0	Hartford Whalers (1991–92)	15–41–11
68	W	March 11, 1992	5–4	Montreal Canadiens (1991–92)	16–41–11
69	L	March 14, 1992	4–5 OT	Boston Bruins (1991–92)	16–42–11
70	L	March 15, 1992	4–6	@ Buffalo Sabres (1991–92)	16–43–11
71	L	March 17, 1992	3–4 OT	@ Toronto Maple Leafs (1991–92)	16–44–11
72	L	March 19, 1992	3–6	@ Pittsburgh Penguins (1991–92)	16–45–11
73	W	March 21, 1992	4–2	Minnesota North Stars (1991–92)	17–45–11
74	W	March 24, 1992	5–2	New York Islanders (1991–92)	18–45–11
75	L	March 26, 1992	4–5 OT	Chicago Blackhawks (1991–92)	18–46–11
76	L	March 28, 1992	2–5	@ New Jersey Devils (1991–92)	18–47–11
77	L	March 31, 1992	4–5 OT	Boston Bruins (1991–92)	18–48–11

April

Game	Result	Date	Score	Opponent	Record
78	T	April 12, 1992	1–1 OT	@ Boston Bruins (1991–92)	18–48–12
79	W	April 14, 1992	7–3	Buffalo Sabres (1991–92)	19–48–12
80	W	April 15, 1992	4–3	@ Buffalo Sabres (1991–92)	20–48–12

Legend: Win (2 points) Loss (0 points) Tie (1 point)

== Player statistics ==
Regular season
Scoring

Player	Pos	GP	G	A	Pts	PIM	+/-	PPG	SHG	GWG
Joe Sakic	C	69	29	65	94	20	5	6	3	1
Mats Sundin	C	80	33	43	76	103	-19	8	2	2
Owen Nolan	RW	75	42	31	73	183	-9	17	0	0
Greg Paslawski	RW	80	28	17	45	18	-12	5	1	4
Mike Hough	LW	61	16	22	38	77	-1	6	2	1
Mikhail Tatarinov	D	66	11	27	38	72	8	5	0	1
Claude Lapointe	LW/C	78	13	20	33	86	-8	0	2	2
Doug Smail	LW	46	10	18	28	47	-11	0	1	1
Alexei Gusarov	D	68	5	18	23	22	-9	3	0	1
Valeri Kamensky	LW	23	7	14	21	14	-1	2	0	1
Herb Raglan	RW	62	6	14	20	120	-5	0	0	0
Jamie Baker	C	52	7	10	17	32	-5	3	0	1
Curtis Leschyshyn	D	42	5	12	17	42	-28	3	0	1
Dan Lambert	D	28	6	9	15	22	-5	2	0	0
Kip Miller	C	36	5	10	15	12	-21	1	0	2
Bryan Fogarty	D	20	3	12	15	16	-15	0	0	0
Marc Fortier	C	39	5	9	14	33	-7	2	0	1
Craig Wolanin	D	69	2	11	13	80	-12	0	0	0
Steven Finn	D	65	4	7	11	194	-9	0	0	0
Stephane Morin	C	30	2	8	10	14	-2	0	0	0
Wayne Van Dorp	LW	24	3	5	8	109	5	0	0	0
Gino Cavallini	LW	18	1	7	8	4	-1	0	0	0
Adam Foote	D	46	2	5	7	44	-4	0	0	0
Bill Lindsay	RW	23	2	4	6	14	-6	0	0	1
John Tonelli	LW	19	2	4	6	14	-7	2	0	0
Randy Velischek	D	38	2	3	5	22	-3	0	0	0
Mike McNeill	RW	26	1	4	5	8	-8	1	0	0
Scott Pearson	LW	10	1	2	3	14	-5	0	0	0
Martin Rucinsky	LW	4	1	1	2	2	1	0	0	0
John Kordic	RW	18	0	2	2	115	-3	0	0	0
Greg Smyth	D	29	0	2	2	138	-10	0	0	0
Mark Vermette	RW	10	1	0	1	8	-6	0	0	0
Jon Klemm	D	4	0	1	1	0	2	0	0	0
Ken McRae	C	10	0	1	1	31	-5	0	0	0
Tony Twist	LW	44	0	1	1	164	-3	0	0	0
Don Barber	W	2	0	0	0	0	-1	0	0	0
Stephane Charbonneau	RW	2	0	0	0	0	-2	0	0	0
Jacques Cloutier	G	26	0	0	0	6	0	0	0	0
Stephane Fiset	G	23	0	0	0	6	0	0	0	0
Kevin Kaminski	C	5	0	0	0	45	-2	0	0	0
Dave Karpa	D	4	0	0	0	14	2	0	0	0
Dave Marcinyshyn	D	5	0	0	0	26	-1	0	0	0
Andy Rymsha	D	6	0	0	0	23	-3	0	0	0
John Tanner	G	14	0	0	0	4	0	0	0	0
Ron Tugnutt	G	30	0	0	0	0	0	0	0	0

Goaltending

Player	MIN	GP	W	L	T	GA	GAA	SO	SA	SV	SV%
Stephane Fiset	1133	23	7	10	2	71	3.76	1	646	575	.890
Jacques Cloutier	1345	26	6	14	3	88	3.93	0	712	624	.876
Ron Tugnutt	1583	30	6	17	3	106	4.02	1	782	676	.864
John Tanner	796	14	1	7	4	46	3.47	1	394	348	.883
Team:	4857	80	20	48	12	311	3.84	3	2534	2223	.877

Note:

Pos = Position;GP = Games played; G = Goals; A = Assists; Pts = Points; PIM = Penalty minutes; +/- = Plus/minus; PPG = Power-play goals; SHG = Short-handed goals; GWG = Game-winning goals
Pos = Position;GP = Games played; Min, TOI = Minutes played; W = Wins; L = Losses; T,T/OT = Ties; OTL = Overtime losses; GA = Goals-against; GAA = Goals-against average; SO = Shutouts; SA = Shots against; SV = Shots saved;SV% = Save percentage;

== Transactions ==
The Nordiques were involved in the following transactions during the 1991–92 season.

=== Trades ===
September 3, 1991	To New York Rangers Cash	To Quebec Nordiques Stephane Guerard
September 25, 1991	To Chicago Blackhawks Ryan McGill	To Quebec Nordiques Mike Dagenais
October 22, 1991	To Winnipeg Jets Shawn Anderson	To Quebec Nordiques Sergei Kharin
February 18, 1992	To Chicago Blackhawks Future Considerations	To Quebec Nordiques John Tonelli
March 7, 1992	To San Jose Sharks Don Barber	To Quebec Nordiques Murray Garbutt
March 8, 1992	To Minnesota North Stars Kip Miller	To Quebec Nordiques Steve Maltais
March 10, 1992	To Edmonton Oilers Ron Tugnutt; Brad Zavisha	To Quebec Nordiques Martin Rucinsky
March 10, 1992	To Calgary Flames Greg Smyth	To Quebec Nordiques Martin Simard
March 10, 1992	To Pittsburgh Penguins Bryan Fogarty	To Quebec Nordiques Scott Young
June 15, 1992	To Detroit Red Wings Cash	To Quebec Nordiques Doug Crossman; Dennis Vial
June 19, 1992	To Tampa Bay Lightning Martin Simard	To Quebec Nordiques Tim Hunter

=== Waivers ===
November 12, 1991	From Winnipeg Jets Don Barber
February 27, 1992	From St. Louis Blues Gino Cavallini

=== Expansion Draft ===
June 18, 1992	To Tampa Bay Lightning Doug Crossman
June 18, 1992	To Tampa Bay Lightning Steve Maltais

=== Free agents ===
Player	Former team
Doug Smail	Minnesota North Stars
John Kordic	Washington Capitals

Player	New team
Ken Quinney	Detroit Red Wings
Jeff Jackson	Chicago Blackhawks

== Draft picks ==
Quebec's draft picks from the 1991 NHL entry draft which was held at the Buffalo Memorial Auditorium in Buffalo, New York.

Round	#	Player	Nationality	College/junior/club team (league)
1	1	Eric Lindros	Canada	Oshawa Generals (OHL)
2	23	Rene Corbet	Canada	Drummondville Voltigeurs (QMJHL)
3	46	Rich Brennan	United States	Tabor Academy (USHS-MA)
4	68	Dave Karpa	Canada	Ferris State University (WCHA)
5	90	Patrick Labrecque	Canada	Saint-Jean Lynx (QMJHL)
5	103	Bill Lindsay	Canada	Tri-City Americans (WHL)
7	134	Mikael Johansson	Sweden	Djurgårdens IF (Sweden)
8	156	Janne Laukkanen	Finland	Lahti (Finland)
8	157	Aaron Asp	Canada	Ferris State University (WCHA)
9	178	Adam Bartell	Canada	Niagara Scenic (NAJHL)
9	188	Brent Brekke	United States	Western Michigan University (CCHA)
10	200	Paul Koch	United States	Omaha Lancers (USHL)
11	222	Doug Friedman	United States	Boston University (Hockey East)
12	244	Eric Meloche	Canada	Drummondville Voltigeurs (QMJHL)
S	2	Dave Trombley	Canada	Clarkson University (ECAC)
S	8	Chris Hynnes	Canada	Colorado College (WCHA)

== Farm teams ==
- Halifax Citadels – American Hockey League
