= 1990–91 Quebec Nordiques season =

National Hockey League team season

1990–91 Quebec Nordiques
- Division: 5th Adams
- Conference: 11th Wales
- 1990–91 record: 16–50–14
- Home record: 9–23–8
- Road record: 7–27–6
- Goals for: 236
- Goals against: 354

Team information
- General manager: Pierre Page
- Coach: Dave Chambers
- Captain: Steven Finn and Joe Sakic
- Arena: Colisée de Québec

Team leaders
- Goals: Joe Sakic (48)
- Assists: Joe Sakic (61)
- Points: Joe Sakic (109)
- Penalty minutes: Steven Finn (228)
- Wins: Ron Tugnutt (12)
- Goals against average: Stephane Fiset (3.87)

The 1990–91 Quebec Nordiques season was the Nordiques 12th season in the National Hockey League (NHL).

== Offseason ==
After finishing in last place in the NHL in 1989–90 with only 31 points, Quebec hired Pierre Page to become the general manager, as Maurice Filion finished the previous season on an interim basis. Page had spent the previous two seasons as head coach of the Minnesota North Stars, helping them to the playoffs in each season with the team.

Page then fired head coach Michel Bergeron, and named his assistant coach from the North Stars, Dave Chambers, to be his head coach in Quebec. This would be Chambers first time as a head coach at the NHL level.

The Nordiques had the first overall pick in the 1990 NHL entry draft, and the club drafted Owen Nolan from the Cornwall Royals of the OHL. Nolan had 51 goals and 110 points with the Royals in 59 games, as well as recording 240 penalty minutes. The team also signed Mats Sundin, their first overall pick from the 1989 NHL entry draft, and would have him on the club for the 1990–91 season.

== Regular season ==
Quebec began the season with a 3-3-3 record in their first nine games, however, the rebuilding team hit a rough patch, and would fall into last place in the Adams Division as they went on a 17-game winless streak. The Nordiques began to make some trades, as Michel Petit, Aaron Broten and Lucien DeBlois were traded to the Toronto Maple Leafs for Scott Pearson, the Leafs second round pick in the 1991 NHL entry draft, and the Leafs second rounder in the 1992 NHL entry draft.

As the season continued on, the losses continued to pile up, and more trades were made. Joe Cirella was traded to the New York Rangers for Aaron Miller and the Rangers fifth round draft pick in the 1991 NHL entry draft, Tony McKegney was sent to the Chicago Blackhawks for Jacques Cloutier, Darin Kimble was traded to the St. Louis Blues for Herb Raglan, Tony Twist and Andy Rymsha, and Paul Gillis and Dan Vincelette were traded to the Chicago Blackhawks for Ryan McGill and Mike McNeill.

The Nordiques finished the season in last place once again, however, there was moderate improvement, as the club had a 16-50-14 record, earning 46 points, which was a 15-point improvement over the 1989–90 season.

Leading the team offensively was Joe Sakic, as he had 48 goals and 61 assists for 109 points in 80 games to lead the club in those categories. Rookie Mats Sundin had a very successful season, scoring 23 goals and 59 points while playing in all 80 games. Guy Lafleur had 12 goals and 28 points in 59 games in his last season, as he announced his retirement.

On defence, Bryan Fogarty rebounded from a poor rookie season, and led the Nordiques blueline with 31 points in only 45 games. Steven Finn had 19 points, while Craig Wolanin had 18 points from the Quebec defence.

In goal, Ron Tugnutt was the starter, earning a team high 12 wins and a team best 4.05 GAA. In a game against the Boston Bruins on March 21, 1991, Tugnutt made a club record 70 saves on 73 shots, as Quebec tied the Bruins 3-3.

The Nordiques finished the regular season having allowed the most goals of all 21 teams, with 354. They also tied the New York Islanders for the fewest power-play goals scored (51), had the lowest power-play percentage (15.55%), allowed the most power-play goals (98) and had the lowest penalty-killing percentage (73.37%).

=== Final standings ===
Adams Division
	GP	W	L	T	GF	GA	Pts
**Boston Bruins**	80	44	24	12	299	264	100
**Montreal Canadiens**	80	39	30	11	273	249	89
**Buffalo Sabres**	80	31	30	19	292	278	81
**Hartford Whalers**	80	31	38	11	238	276	73
Quebec Nordiques	80	16	50	14	236	354	46

Note: GP = Games played, W = Wins, L = Losses, T = Ties, Pts = Points, GF = Goals for, GA = Goals against
Note: Teams that qualified for the playoffs are highlighted in bold.

Wales Conference
R		Div	GP	W	L	T	GF	GA	Pts
**1**	**Boston Bruins**	**ADM**	**80**	**44**	**24**	**12**	**299**	**264**	**100**
**2**	**Montreal Canadiens**	**ADM**	**80**	**39**	**30**	**11**	**273**	**249**	**89**
**3**	**Pittsburgh Penguins**	**PTK**	**80**	**41**	**33**	**6**	**342**	**305**	**88**
**4**	**New York Rangers**	**PTK**	**80**	**36**	**31**	**13**	**297**	**265**	**85**
**5**	**Washington Capitals**	**PTK**	**80**	**37**	**36**	**7**	**258**	**258**	**81**
**6**	**Buffalo Sabres**	**ADM**	**80**	**31**	**30**	**19**	**292**	**278**	**81**
**7**	**New Jersey Devils**	**PTK**	**80**	**32**	**33**	**15**	**272**	**264**	**79**
8	Philadelphia Flyers	PTK	80	33	37	10	252	267	76
**9**	**Hartford Whalers**	**ADM**	**80**	**31**	**38**	**11**	**238**	**276**	**73**
10	New York Islanders	PTK	80	25	45	10	223	290	60
11	Quebec Nordiques	ADM	80	16	50	14	236	354	46

Divisions: PTK – Patrick, ADM – Adams

bold – Qualified for playoffs

== Schedule and results ==
1990–91 regular season
October

Game	Result	Date	Score	Opponent	Record	Attendance
1	T	October 4, 1990	3–3	@ Hartford Whalers (1990–91)	0–0–1	11,573
2	L	October 6, 1990	1–7	@ Boston Bruins (1990–91)	0–1–1	14,225
3	L	October 7, 1990	2–5	Boston Bruins (1990–91)	0–2–1	14,560
4	W	October 10, 1990	8–5	@ Toronto Maple Leafs (1990–91)	1–2–1	16,382
5	W	October 12, 1990	4–2	@ Buffalo Sabres (1990–91)	2–2–1	14,958
6	T	October 13, 1990	4–4 OT	Buffalo Sabres (1990–91)	2–2–2	13,715
7	T	October 16, 1990	1–1 OT	Hartford Whalers (1990–91)	2–2–3	13,940
8	L	October 18, 1990	4–5	@ Philadelphia Flyers (1990–91)	2–3–3	16,995
9	W	October 20, 1990	5–3	Detroit Red Wings (1990–91)	3–3–3	13,106
10	L	October 21, 1990	2–3	Vancouver Canucks (1990–91)	3–4–3	14,094
11	L	October 25, 1990	3–6	@ Pittsburgh Penguins (1990–91)	3–5–3	15,132
12	L	October 27, 1990	1–4	New York Rangers (1990–91)	3–6–3	13,470
13	L	October 29, 1990	0–5	@ New York Rangers (1990–91)	3–7–3	14,571

November

Game	Result	Date	Score	Opponent	Record	Attendance
14	L	November 1, 1990	2–6	@ Chicago Blackhawks (1990–91)	3–8–3	17,379
15	L	November 3, 1990	0–2	Minnesota North Stars (1990–91)	3–9–3	13,795
16	L	November 6, 1990	1–4	Washington Capitals (1990–91)	3–10–3	13,027
17	L	November 8, 1990	2–3	@ Minnesota North Stars (1990–91)	3–11–3	5,286
18	L	November 10, 1990	2–5	Philadelphia Flyers (1990–91)	3–12–3	14,426
19	L	November 11, 1990	4–5 OT	@ Montreal Canadiens (1990–91)	3–13–3	16,896
20	L	November 13, 1990	2–4	@ St. Louis Blues (1990–91)	3–14–3	14,304
21	L	November 15, 1990	0–6	@ Boston Bruins (1990–91)	3–15–3	14,002
22	L	November 17, 1990	2–7	Chicago Blackhawks (1990–91)	3–16–3	14,333
23	L	November 19, 1990	2–5	Montreal Canadiens (1990–91)	3–17–3	15,399
24	T	November 21, 1990	4–4 OT	@ Hartford Whalers (1990–91)	3–17–4	11,395
25	L	November 24, 1990	4–11	Winnipeg Jets (1990–91)	3–18–4	13,881
26	T	November 25, 1990	4–4 OT	Los Angeles Kings (1990–91)	3–18–5	14,739
27	W	November 28, 1990	4–3	@ Hartford Whalers (1990–91)	4–18–5	10,682

December

Game	Result	Date	Score	Opponent	Record	Attendance
28	W	December 1, 1990	4–2	Buffalo Sabres (1990–91)	5–18–5	13,324
29	T	December 2, 1990	5–5 OT	Calgary Flames (1990–91)	5–18–6	13,682
30	L	December 5, 1990	2–3	@ Edmonton Oilers (1990–91)	5–19–6	15,300
31	W	December 7, 1990	5–3	@ Calgary Flames (1990–91)	6–19–6	19,790
32	W	December 10, 1990	3–2 OT	@ Vancouver Canucks (1990–91)	7–19–6	14,132
33	L	December 13, 1990	2–5	@ Detroit Red Wings (1990–91)	7–20–6	19,290
34	L	December 15, 1990	2–7	New York Islanders (1990–91)	7–21–6	13,534
35	W	December 18, 1990	6–4	Montreal Canadiens (1990–91)	8–21–6	15,346
36	T	December 19, 1990	1–1 OT	@ Montreal Canadiens (1990–91)	8–21–7	16,832
37	L	December 22, 1990	1–4	New Jersey Devils (1990–91)	8–22–7	14,124
38	L	December 23, 1990	3–10	@ Buffalo Sabres (1990–91)	8–23–7	14,404
39	L	December 26, 1990	1–4	Hartford Whalers (1990–91)	8–24–7	13,083
40	W	December 29, 1990	4–3	Washington Capitals (1990–91)	9–24–7	13,769
41	L	December 31, 1990	3–6	@ New York Islanders (1990–91)	9–25–7	11,189

January

Game	Result	Date	Score	Opponent	Record	Attendance
42	L	January 3, 1991	7–8	@ St. Louis Blues (1990–91)	9–26–7	17,241
43	L	January 5, 1991	0–3	@ Montreal Canadiens (1990–91)	9–27–7	17,561
44	W	January 8, 1991	4–2	Boston Bruins (1990–91)	10–27–7	14,348
45	L	January 10, 1991	3–5	@ Boston Bruins (1990–91)	10–28–7	14,013
46	T	January 12, 1991	4–4 OT	St. Louis Blues (1990–91)	10–28–8	14,079
47	L	January 13, 1991	3–4	New York Islanders (1990–91)	10–29–8	12,359
48	L	January 17, 1991	1–5	@ Philadelphia Flyers (1990–91)	10–30–8	17,287
49	T	January 22, 1991	4–4 OT	Toronto Maple Leafs (1990–91)	10–30–9	10,861
50	L	January 24, 1991	1–6	@ New Jersey Devils (1990–91)	10–31–9	10,191
51	L	January 26, 1991	5–6	Pittsburgh Penguins (1990–91)	10–32–9	13,834
52	L	January 29, 1991	2–5	Winnipeg Jets (1990–91)	10–33–9	13,140
53	W	January 31, 1991	4–1	@ Buffalo Sabres (1990–91)	11–33–9	14,814

February

Game	Result	Date	Score	Opponent	Record	Attendance
54	L	February 2, 1991	4–6	Minnesota North Stars (1990–91)	11–34–9	14,306
55	L	February 7, 1991	1–5	Montreal Canadiens (1990–91)	11–35–9	15,399
56	W	February 9, 1991	3–1	New Jersey Devils (1990–91)	12–35–9	15,057
57	L	February 10, 1991	4–7	Boston Bruins (1990–91)	12–36–9	15,275
58	T	February 12, 1991	4–4 OT	Buffalo Sabres (1990–91)	12–36–10	13,196
59	L	February 14, 1991	1–2 OT	@ Chicago Blackhawks (1990–91)	12–37–10	17,347
60	L	February 17, 1991	0–6	@ Winnipeg Jets (1990–91)	12–38–10	12,798
61	T	February 18, 1991	3–3 OT	@ Vancouver Canucks (1990–91)	12–38–11	14,024
62	L	February 20, 1991	1–6	@ Los Angeles Kings (1990–91)	12–39–11	16,005
63	L	February 23, 1991	8–10	@ Calgary Flames (1990–91)	12–40–11	20,132
64	L	February 24, 1991	3–6	@ Edmonton Oilers (1990–91)	12–41–11	16,375
65	L	February 28, 1991	1–5	Buffalo Sabres (1990–91)	12–42–11	15,060

March

Game	Result	Date	Score	Opponent	Record	Attendance
66	T	March 2, 1991	3–3 OT	Hartford Whalers (1990–91)	12–42–12	N/A
67	L	March 5, 1991	3–6	@ Detroit Red Wings (1990–91)	12–43–12	19,501
68	W	March 7, 1991	4–2	New York Rangers (1990–91)	13–43–12	15,055
69	L	March 9, 1991	0–3	Los Angeles Kings (1990–91)	13–44–12	15,399
70	W	March 10, 1991	2–1	@ Hartford Whalers (1990–91)	14–44–12	11,508
71	L	March 12, 1991	3–4	Toronto Maple Leafs (1990–91)	14–45–12	15,269
72	L	March 14, 1991	3–5	@ Washington Capitals (1990–91)	14–46–12	15,492
73	L	March 16, 1991	3–6	@ Pittsburgh Penguins (1990–91)	14–47–12	16,164
74	L	March 19, 1991	6–7 OT	Edmonton Oilers (1990–91)	14–48–12	15,194
75	T	March 21, 1991	3–3 OT	@ Boston Bruins (1990–91)	14–48–13	14,448
76	W	March 23, 1991	7–3	Hartford Whalers (1990–91)	15–48–13	15,293
77	L	March 26, 1991	4–7	Boston Bruins (1990–91)	15–49–13	15,375
78	T	March 28, 1991	4–4 OT	@ Buffalo Sabres (1990–91)	15–49–14	15,324
79	L	March 30, 1991	3–4	@ Montreal Canadiens (1990–91)	15–50–14	17,664
80	W	March 31, 1991	4–1	Montreal Canadiens (1990–91)	16–50–14	15,399

Legend: Win (2 points) Loss (0 points) Tie (1 point)

== Player statistics ==
Regular season
Scoring

Player	Pos	GP	G	A	Pts	PIM	+/-	PPG	SHG	GWG
Joe Sakic	C	80	48	61	109	24	-26	12	3	7
Mats Sundin	C	80	23	36	59	58	-24	4	0	0
Tony Hrkac	C	70	16	32	48	16	-22	6	0	0
Stephane Morin	C	48	13	27	40	30	6	3	1	2
Tony McKegney	LW	50	17	16	33	44	-25	7	0	2
Mike Hough	LW	63	13	20	33	111	-7	1	1	1
Bryan Fogarty	D	45	9	22	31	24	-11	3	0	2
Guy Lafleur	RW	59	12	16	28	2	-10	3	0	0
Steven Finn	D	71	6	13	19	228	-26	0	0	0
Craig Wolanin	D	80	5	13	18	89	-13	0	1	0
Scott Pearson	LW	35	11	4	15	86	-4	0	0	0
Claude Loiselle	C	59	5	10	15	86	-20	0	2	0
Shawn Anderson	D	31	3	10	13	21	2	2	0	0
Owen Nolan	RW	59	3	10	13	109	-19	0	0	0
Alexei Gusarov	D	36	3	9	12	12	-4	1	0	0
Joe Cirella	D	39	2	10	12	59	-28	0	0	0
Randy Velischek	D	79	2	10	12	42	-19	0	0	0
Michel Petit	D	19	4	7	11	47	-15	3	0	0
Paul Gillis	C	49	3	8	11	91	-19	0	1	0
Everett Sanipass	LW	29	5	5	10	41	-15	1	0	0
Curtis Leschyshyn	D	55	3	7	10	49	-19	2	0	1
Aaron Broten	LW/C	20	5	4	9	6	-3	1	0	0
Kip Miller	C	13	4	3	7	7	-1	0	0	0
Ken Quinney	RW	19	3	4	7	2	-2	1	0	0
Mark Vermette	RW	34	3	4	7	10	-15	0	0	0
Darin Kimble	RW	35	2	5	7	114	-5	0	0	0
Mike McNeill	RW	14	2	5	7	4	5	1	0	0
Jeff Jackson	LW	10	3	1	4	4	3	0	0	0
Lucien DeBlois	C	14	2	2	4	13	1	0	0	1
Claude Lapointe	LW/C	13	2	2	4	4	3	0	0	0
Herb Raglan	RW	15	1	3	4	30	1	0	0	0
Marc Fortier	C	14	0	4	4	6	-3	0	0	0
Jamie Baker	C	18	2	0	2	8	-4	0	1	0
Wayne Van Dorp	LW	4	1	0	1	30	1	0	0	0
Dan Vincelette	LW	16	0	1	1	38	-10	0	0	0
Jacques Cloutier	G	15	0	0	0	4	0	0	0	0
Daniel Dore	RW	1	0	0	0	0	1	0	0	0
Mario Doyon	D	12	0	0	0	4	-3	0	0	0
Stephane Fiset	G	3	0	0	0	0	0	0	0	0
Scott Gordon	G	13	0	0	0	0	0	0	0	0
Dan Lambert	D	1	0	0	0	0	0	0	0	0
David Latta	LW	1	0	0	0	0	0	0	0	0
Bruce Major	C	4	0	0	0	0	-1	0	0	0
Ken McRae	C	12	0	0	0	36	-7	0	0	0
Serge Roberge	RW	9	0	0	0	24	0	0	0	0
Greg Smyth	D	1	0	0	0	0	0	0	0	0
John Tanner	G	6	0	0	0	2	0	0	0	0
Ron Tugnutt	G	56	0	0	0	0	0	0	0	0
Tony Twist	LW	24	0	0	0	104	-4	0	0	0

Goaltending

Player	MIN	GP	W	L	T	GA	GAA	SO	SA	SV	SV%
Ron Tugnutt	3144	56	12	29	10	212	4.05	0	1851	1639	.885
Jacques Cloutier	829	15	3	8	2	61	4.41	0	526	465	.884
John Tanner	228	6	1	3	1	16	4.21	0	133	117	.880
Stephane Fiset	186	3	0	2	1	12	3.87	0	123	111	.902
Scott Gordon	485	13	0	8	0	48	5.94	0	225	177	.787
Team:	4872	80	16	50	14	349	4.30	0	2858	2509	.878

Note:

Pos = Position;GP = Games played; G = Goals; A = Assists; Pts = Points; PIM = Penalty minutes; +/- = Plus/minus; PPG = Power-play goals; SHG = Short-handed goals; GWG = Game-winning goals
Pos = Position;GP = Games played; Min, TOI = Minutes played; W = Wins; L = Losses; T,T/OT = Ties; OTL = Overtime losses; GA = Goals-against; GAA = Goals-against average; SO = Shutouts; SA = Shots against; SV = Shots saved;SV% = Save percentage;

== Transactions ==
The Nordiques were involved in the following transactions during the 1990–91 season.

=== Trades ===
November 10, 1990	To Edmonton Oilers Max Middendorf	To Quebec Nordiques 9th round pick in 1991 - Brent Brekke
November 17, 1990	To Toronto Maple Leafs Michel Petit; Lucien DeBlois; Aaron Broten	To Quebec Nordiques Scott Pearson; 2nd round pick in 1991 - Eric Lavigne; 2nd round pick in 1992 - Tuomas Gronman
January 17, 1991	To New York Rangers Joe Cirella	To Quebec Nordiques Aaron Miller; 5th round pick in 1991 - Bill Lindsay
January 29, 1991	To Chicago Blackhawks Tony McKegney	To Quebec Nordiques Jacques Cloutier
February 4, 1991	To St. Louis Blues Darin Kimble	To Quebec Nordiques Herb Raglan; Tony Twist; Andy Rymsha
March 5, 1991	To Chicago Blackhawks Paul Gillis; Dan Vincelette	To Quebec Nordiques Ryan McGill; Mike McNeill
May 25, 1991	To New York Rangers Stephane Guerard	To Quebec Nordiques Miloslav Horava
May 31, 1991	To Minnesota North Stars Alan Haworth	To Quebec Nordiques Guy Lafleur
June 3, 1991	To New Jersey Devils Brent Severyn	To Quebec Nordiques Dave Marcinyshyn
June 22, 1991	To Washington Capitals 2nd round pick in 1991 - Eric Lavigne	To Quebec Nordiques Mikhail Tatarinov

=== Waivers ===
October 1, 1990	From Minnesota North Stars Aaron Broten
October 1, 1990	From Washington Capitals Shawn Anderson
October 1, 1990	From Chicago Blackhawks Wayne Van Dorp
October 3, 1990	To St. Louis Blues Mario Marois
March 5, 1991	To Toronto Maple Leafs Claude Loiselle

=== Expansion Draft ===
May 30, 1991	To Minnesota North Stars Guy Lafleur

=== Free agents ===
Player	Former team
Serge Roberge	Montreal Canadiens
Stephane Charbonneau	Chicoutimi Saguenéens (QMJHL)
Denis Chasse	Drummondville Voltigeurs (QMJHL)
Jon Klemm	Spokane Chiefs (WHL)

Player	New team
Bobby Dollas	Detroit Red Wings

== Draft picks ==
Quebec's draft picks from the 1990 NHL entry draft which was held at BC Place Stadium in Vancouver, British Columbia.

Round	#	Player	Nationality	College/junior/club team (league)
1	1	Owen Nolan	Canada	Cornwall Royals (OHL)
2	22	Ryan Hughes	Canada	Cornell Big Red (NCAA)
3	43	Brad Zavisha	Canada	Seattle Thunderbirds (WHL)
6	106	Jeff Parrott	Canada	Minnesota Duluth Bulldogs (NCAA)
7	127	Dwayne Norris	Canada	Michigan State Spartans (NCAA)
8	148	Andrei Kovalenko	Soviet Union	CSKA Moscow (Soviet Union)
8	158	Alexander Karpovtsev	Soviet Union	Dynamo Moscow (Soviet Union)
9	169	Pat Mazzoli	Canada	Humboldt Broncos (SJHL)
10	190	Scott Davis	Canada	Manitoba Bisons (CWUAA)
11	211	Mika Stromberg	Finland	Jokerit (Finland)
12	232	Wade Klippenstein	Canada	Alaska Nanooks (NCAA)
S	1	Mike McKee	Canada	Princeton University (ECAC)
S	6	Darryl Noren	United States	University of Illinois Chicago (CCHA)

== Farm Teams ==
- Halifax Citadels - AHL
