= 2005 IIHF World Championship final =

Ice hockey match

	1	2	3	Total
Czech Republic	1	0	2	3
Canada	0	0	0	0
- Date: 15 May 2005
- Arena: Wiener Stadthalle
- City: Vienna
- Attendance: 7,999

The 2005 IIHF World Championship final was an ice hockey match that took place on 15 May 2005 at the Wiener Stadthalle in Vienna, Austria, to determine the winner of the 2005 IIHF World Championship. The Czech Republic defeated Canada 3–0 to win its fifth championship.

== Background ==
The game marked the second time that Canada and the Czech Republic would meet in the World Championship finals. The previous time was in the 1996 tournament, also in Vienna, Austria. In that game the Czech Republic defeated Canada by a score of 4–2 on 5 May 1996. The Czech Republic were finalists for the first time since 2001, the end of their dominance of the late 1990s and early 2000s, where they won 4 World Championships in the span of 6 years (1996–2001). Canada, however, had a more recent hot streak and were clear favorites, as they were looking for their third consecutive title after winning in 2003 and 2004.

== Venue ==
The Wiener Stadthalle in Vienna was determined to host the final of the championship. Previously at the tournament, the venue hosted both semifinals, as well as the bronze medal match. In the final, the attendance was 7,999.

== The match ==
=== Summary ===
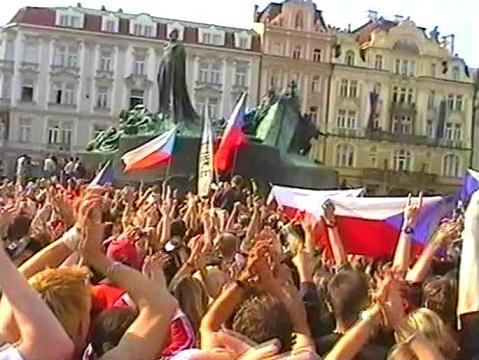
Czech fans celebrating in Old Town Square in Prague.

Václav Prospal opened the scoring for the Czech Republic at 4:13 minutes into the game, assisted by Martin Ručinský and Jaromír Jágr. This ended up to be the game winning goal, the fastest in IIHF finals history.

A deadlock second period saw Canada go on the powerplay twice and outshoot the Czechs 11–7. Czech goaltender Tomáš Vokoun displayed a dominant performance however, facing some of Canada's stars such as Dany Heatly, Rick Nash and Ryan Smyth. Vokoun, who entered the tournament in the shadow of the legendary Czech goalie Dominik Hašek, ended with a stellar performance and a shutout in the final, the first time this was achieved in a single game final.

3:12 into the third period, Martin Ručinský received a fast saucer pass from Jágr, off of Petr Čajánek, while rushing the offensive zone and fired a wrist shot which beat Martin Brodeur low on the glove side. With less than a minute remaining in the match, Josef Vašíček scored an empty net goal, which brought the final score to 3–0 for the Czech republic.

The Czechs were overall more agile and had more speed, more than likely because of the 2004–05 NHL lockout, which left 12 players of Canada's without a club team in close to a calendar year, while almost every member of the Czech roster was playing in the Czech Extraliga, or other European leagues.

=== Details ===
15 May 2005; 20:15	Czech Republic	3–0 (1–0, 0–0, 2–0)	Canada	Wiener Stadthalle, Vienna; Attendance: 7,999

Game reference

Tomáš Vokoun
Goalies
Martin Brodeur
Referee:
(Sweden) T. Andersson

Prospal (Ručinský, Jágr) – 4:13	1–0
Ručinský (Jágr, Čajánek) – 43:12	2–0
Vašíček – 59:07	3–0

20 min
Penalties
30 min
27
Shots
29

== See also ==
- 2005 IIHF World Championship
- Canada men's national ice hockey team
- Czech Republic men's national ice hockey team
