= 1999 IIHF World Championship =

1999 edition of the IIHF World Championship

Tournament details
- Host country: Norway
- Venues: 3 (in 3 host cities)
- Dates: 1–16 May
- Opened by: Harald V
- Teams: 16

Final positions
- Champions: Czech Republic (2nd title)
- Runners-up: Finland
- Third place: Sweden
- Fourth place: Canada

Tournament statistics
- Games played: 49
- Goals scored: 302 (6.16 per game)
- Attendance: 180,394 (3,682 per game)
- Scoring leader: (Finland) Saku Koivu (16 pts)

Awards
- MVP: (Finland) Teemu Selänne

The 1999 IIHF World Championship was held in Oslo, Hamar and Lillehammer in Norway from 1 to 16 May. It was the top tier of the men's championships for that year.

== Venues ==
| 1999 IIHF World Championship is located in Southwest Scandinavia | Lillehammer | Oslo | Hamar |
| 1999 IIHF World Championship is located in Southwest Scandinavia | Håkons Hall; Capacity: 11,500 | Jordal Amfi; Capacity: 4,500 | Hamar Olympic Amphitheatre; Capacity: 6,000 |

== World Championship Group A ==
=== Qualifying round ===
Three qualifying tournaments were played to establish the last five entrants to the World Championship. Two groups of four played in Europe, first and second place from each advanced, while the others were relegated to Group B. The winner of the "Far East" tournament advanced to the World Championship, while the losers played in Group C.

==== Group 1 (Austria) ====
Played 5–8 November 1998 in Klagenfurt.

| Pos | Team | Pld | W | D | L | GF | GA | GD | Pts |
|---|---|---|---|---|---|---|---|---|---|
| 1 | United States | 3 | 3 | 0 | 0 | 12 | 1 | +11 | 6 |
| 2 | Austria | 3 | 2 | 0 | 1 | 12 | 6 | +6 | 4 |
| 3 | Kazakhstan | 3 | 1 | 0 | 2 | 10 | 9 | +1 | 2 |
| 4 | Estonia | 3 | 0 | 0 | 3 | 3 | 21 | −18 | 0 |

The United States and Austria advanced to the World Championship.

| 5 November 1998 | United States | 3-0 | Kazakhstan |

| 5 November 1998 | Austria | 6-2 | Estonia |

| 7 November 1998 | United States | 7-1 | Estonia |

| 7 November 1998 | Austria | 6-2 | Kazakhstan |

| 8 November 1998 | Kazakhstan | 8-0 | Estonia |

| 8 November 1998 | Austria | 0-2 | United States |

==== Group 2 (Slovenia) ====
Played 5–8 November 1998 in Ljubljana.

| Pos | Team | Pld | W | D | L | GF | GA | GD | Pts |
|---|---|---|---|---|---|---|---|---|---|
| 1 | Ukraine | 3 | 2 | 1 | 0 | 8 | 4 | +4 | 5 |
| 2 | France | 3 | 2 | 0 | 1 | 9 | 7 | +2 | 4 |
| 3 | Slovenia | 3 | 0 | 2 | 1 | 5 | 8 | −3 | 2 |
| 4 | Germany | 3 | 0 | 1 | 2 | 3 | 6 | −3 | 1 |

Ukraine and France advanced to the World Championship.

| 5 November 1998 | Slovenia | 1-1 | Germany |

| 5 November 1998 | Ukraine | 4-1 | France |

| 7 November 1998 | Germany | 1-2 | Ukraine |

| 7 November 1998 | Slovenia | 2-5 | France |

| 8 November 1998 | France | 3-1 | Germany |

| 8 November 1998 | Slovenia | 2-2 | Ukraine |

==== Far East (Japan) ====
Played 4–6 September 1998 in Tokyo.

| Pos | Team | Pld | W | D | L | GF | GA | GD | Pts |
|---|---|---|---|---|---|---|---|---|---|
| 1 | Japan | 2 | 2 | 0 | 0 | 24 | 4 | +20 | 4 |
| 2 | South Korea | 2 | 1 | 0 | 1 | 3 | 9 | −6 | 2 |
| 3 | China | 2 | 0 | 0 | 2 | 2 | 16 | −14 | 0 |

Japan advanced to the World Championship.

| 4 September 1998 | Japan | 15-2 | China |

| 5 September 1998 | South Korea | 1-0 | China |

| 6 September 1998 | Japan | 9-2 | South Korea |

=== First round ===
In each group, the top two nations advanced to the next round. Third place teams played a final round against each other to determine who escaped having to qualify for next year's tournament. Fourth place teams did not play further, they were automatically entered in qualifiers for next year's tournament.

==== Group 1 ====
| Team | Pld | W | D | L | GF | GA | GD | Pts |
|---|---|---|---|---|---|---|---|---|
| Canada | 3 | 3 | 0 | 0 | 12 | 6 | +6 | 6 |
| Slovakia | 3 | 2 | 0 | 1 | 17 | 9 | +8 | 4 |
| Norway | 3 | 1 | 0 | 2 | 9 | 14 | −5 | 2 |
| Italy | 3 | 0 | 0 | 3 | 8 | 17 | −9 | 0 |

Italy was relegated to the qualifiers for the 2000 IIHF World Championship.

| 1 May | Canada | 3-2 | Slovakia |

| 1 May | Norway | 5-2 | Italy |

| 3 May | Slovakia | 7-4 | Italy |

| 3 May | Norway | 2-4 | Canada |

| 5 May | Canada | 5-2 | Italy |

| 5 May | Norway | 2-8 | Slovakia |

==== Group 2 ====
| Team | Pld | W | D | L | GF | GA | GD | Pts |
|---|---|---|---|---|---|---|---|---|
| Sweden | 3 | 3 | 0 | 0 | 14 | 5 | +9 | 6 |
| Switzerland | 3 | 2 | 0 | 1 | 12 | 9 | +3 | 4 |
| Latvia | 3 | 1 | 0 | 2 | 14 | 14 | 0 | 2 |
| France | 3 | 0 | 0 | 3 | 6 | 18 | −12 | 0 |

France was relegated to the qualifiers for the 2000 IIHF World Championship.

| 1 May | Switzerland | 5-3 | Latvia |

| 1 May | Sweden | 4-1 | France |

| 3 May | Latvia | 8-5 | France |

| 3 May | Sweden | 6-1 | Switzerland |

| 5 May | Switzerland | 6-0 | France |

| 5 May | Sweden | 4-3 | Latvia |

==== Group 3 ====
| Team | Pld | W | D | L | GF | GA | GD | Pts |
|---|---|---|---|---|---|---|---|---|
| Czech Republic | 3 | 3 | 0 | 0 | 23 | 5 | +18 | 6 |
| United States | 3 | 2 | 0 | 1 | 15 | 7 | +8 | 4 |
| Austria | 3 | 1 | 0 | 2 | 6 | 14 | −8 | 2 |
| Japan | 3 | 0 | 0 | 3 | 5 | 23 | −18 | 0 |

Japan was relegated to the qualifiers for the 2000 IIHF World Championship.

| 2 May | Czech Republic | 7-0 | Austria |

| 2 May | United States | 7-1 | Japan |

| 4 May | Czech Republic | 12-2 | Japan |

| 4 May | United States | 5-2 | Austria |

| 6 May | Czech Republic | 4-3 | United States |

| 6 May | Austria | 4-2 | Japan |

==== Group 4 ====
| Team | Pld | W | D | L | GF | GA | GD | Pts |
|---|---|---|---|---|---|---|---|---|
| Finland | 3 | 2 | 1 | 0 | 10 | 5 | +5 | 5 |
| Russia | 3 | 1 | 2 | 0 | 9 | 6 | +3 | 4 |
| Belarus | 3 | 1 | 1 | 1 | 9 | 7 | +2 | 3 |
| Ukraine | 3 | 0 | 0 | 3 | 3 | 13 | −10 | 0 |

Ukraine was relegated to the qualifiers for the 2000 IIHF World Championship.

| 2 May | Russia | 2-2 | Belarus |

| 2 May | Finland | 3-1 | Ukraine |

| 4 May | Russia | 4-1 | Ukraine |

| 4 May | Belarus | 1-4 | Finland |

| 6 May | Belarus | 6-1 | Ukraine |

| 6 May | Russia | 3-3 | Finland |

=== Second round ===
==== Group 5 ====
| Team | Pld | W | D | L | GF | GA | GD | Pts |
|---|---|---|---|---|---|---|---|---|
| Finland | 3 | 3 | 0 | 0 | 13 | 6 | +7 | 6 |
| Canada | 3 | 2 | 0 | 1 | 14 | 7 | +7 | 4 |
| United States | 3 | 1 | 0 | 2 | 7 | 8 | −1 | 2 |
| Switzerland | 3 | 0 | 0 | 3 | 3 | 16 | −13 | 0 |

| 7 May | Canada | 8-2 | Switzerland |

| 7 May | Finland | 4-3 | United States |

| 8 May | Canada | 4-1 | United States |

| 8 May | Finland | 5-1 | Switzerland |

| 10 May | Finland | 4-2 | Canada |

| 10 May | United States | 3-0 | Switzerland |

==== Group 6 ====
| Team | Pld | W | D | L | GF | GA | GD | Pts |
|---|---|---|---|---|---|---|---|---|
| Czech Republic | 3 | 2 | 0 | 1 | 11 | 8 | +3 | 4 |
| Sweden | 3 | 2 | 0 | 1 | 6 | 4 | +2 | 4 |
| Russia | 3 | 1 | 1 | 1 | 9 | 7 | +2 | 3 |
| Slovakia | 3 | 0 | 1 | 2 | 5 | 12 | −7 | 1 |

| 7 May | Russia | 6-1 | Czech Republic |

| 7 May | Sweden | 2-1 | Slovakia |

| 8 May | Czech Republic | 8-2 | Slovakia |

| 8 May | Sweden | 4-1 | Russia |

| 10 May | Russia | 2-2 | Slovakia |

| 10 May | Sweden | 0-2 | Czech Republic |

=== Final round ===
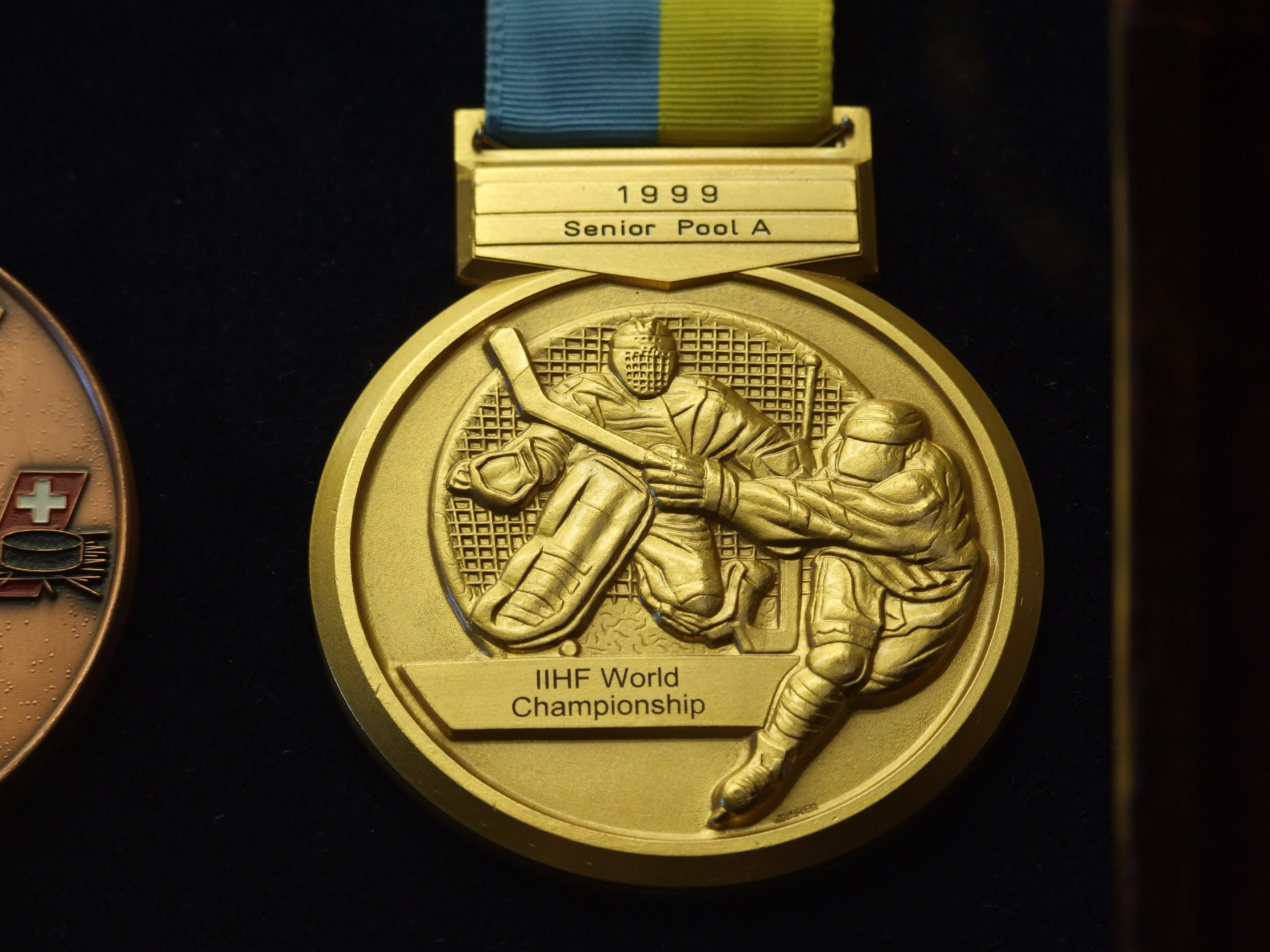
Medal of the tournament

Each playoff match up consisted of a two-game series. If tied, the two teams would play an overtime-style mini game (10 minutes in duration for the semi-finals and 20 minutes in the final) to determine the winner, and then a shoot-out if no scoring occurred. The only mini-game to go to a shoot-out was the Czech versus Canada tiebreaker, with a 4 to 3 Czech victory. Note that the mini-games show up as a game played in the players statistics. The exception was for the bronze medal game which was just one game.

Semifinals
12 and 13 May – Lillehammer
Finland (OT) | 3 | 1 | 1 (1)
Sweden | 1 | 2 | 1 (0)
12 and 13 May – Lillehammer
Czech Republic (SO) | 1 | 6 | 1 (4)
Canada | 2 | 4 | 1 (3)

Finals
15 and 16 May – Lillehammer
Finland | 1 | 4 | 1 (0)
Czech Republic (OT) | 3 | 1 | 1 (1)
Bronze medal game
15 May – Lillehammer
Sweden | 3
Canada | 2

=== Semifinals ===
| 12 May | Finland | 3–1 (0–0, 2–1, 1–0) | Sweden | Lillehammer; Attendance: 6,353 |

Ari Sulander
Goalies
Tommy Salo

| Marko Tuomainen − 23:38 | 1–0 |
| Raimo Helminen − 29:09 | 2–0 |
| | 2–1 | 33:38 − Niklas Sundström |
| Jere Karalahti − 50:17 | 3–1 |

| 12 May | Czech Republic | 1–2 (0–1, 0–1, 1–0) | Canada | Lillehammer; Attendance: 6,100 |

| | 0–1 | 04:01 − Wade Redden |
| | 0–2 | 35:35 − Cory Stillman |
| Pavel Kubina − 53:54 | 1–2 |

| 13 May | Sweden | 2–1 (0–1 OT) (0–0, 1–0, 1–1) | Finland | Lillehammer; Attendance: 7,379 |

Tommy Salo
Goalies
Ari Sulander

| Jörgen Jönsson − 26:37 | 1–0 |
| | 1–1 | 51:58 − Juha Lind |
| Jörgen Jönsson − 53:04 | 2–1 |

| 0–1 | 06:26 − Marko Tuomainen ot. |

| 13 May | Canada | 4–6 (3–4 GWS) (1–2, 1–1, 2–3) | Czech Republic | Lillehammer; Attendance: 6,579 |

=== Match for third place ===
| 15 May | Sweden | 3–2 (2–0, 1–0, 0–2) | Canada | Lillehammer; Attendance: 8,811 |

Tommy Salo
Goalies
Ron Tugnutt
Referee:
Rami Savolainen (Finland)
Linesmen:
Panu Bruun (Finland)
Hirokazu Takahashi (Japan)

| Markus Näslund − 12:14 | 1–0 |
| Christer Olsson − 14:53 | 2–0 |
| Jörgen Jönsson − 37:57 | 3–0 |
| | 3–1 | 41:18 − Brian Savage |
| | 3–2 | 48:49 − Adam Graves |

=== Final ===
| 15 May | Finland | 1–3 (0–1, 0–1, 1–1) | Czech Republic | Lillehammer; Attendance: 8,949 |

Ari Sulander
Goalies
Milan Hnilička
Referee:
Danny Kurmann (Switzerland)
Linesmen:
Nadir Mandioni (Switzerland)
Kent Thudén (Sweden)

| | 0–1 | 10:53 − František Kaberle |
| | 0–2 | 37:20 − Martin Ručinský |
| Juha Lind − 54:42 | 1–2 |
| | 1–3 | 59:29 − Radek Dvořák |

| 16 May | Czech Republic | 1–4 (1–0 OT) (0–2, 1–1, 0–1) | Finland | Lillehammer; Attendance: 9,187 |

Milan Hnilička
Goalies
Miikka Kiprusoff
Referee:
Danny Kurmann (Switzerland)
Linesmen:
Nadir Mandioni (Switzerland)
Kent Thudén (Sweden)

| | 0–1 | 01:41 − Antti-Jussi Niemi |
| | 0–2 | 05:35 − Juha Lind |
| | 0–3 | 21:51 − Marko Tuomainen |
| Viktor Ujčík − 30:47 | 1–3 |
| | 1–4 | 46:52 − Ville Peltonen |

| ot. Jan Hlaváč − 16:32 | 1–0 |

=== Consolation round 9–12 place ===
| Team | Pld | W | D | L | GF | GA | GD | Pts |
|---|---|---|---|---|---|---|---|---|
| Belarus | 3 | 3 | 0 | 0 | 7 | 3 | +4 | 6 |
| Austria | 3 | 2 | 0 | 1 | 10 | 5 | +5 | 4 |
| Latvia | 3 | 1 | 0 | 2 | 10 | 8 | +2 | 2 |
| Norway | 3 | 0 | 0 | 3 | 1 | 12 | −11 | 0 |

Latvia and Norway were relegated to the qualifiers for the 2000 IIHF World Championship.

| 8 May | Austria | 5-2 | Latvia |

| 8 May | Norway | 0-2 | Belarus |

| 9 May | Belarus | 3-2 | Austria |

| 9 May | Norway | 1-7 | Latvia |

| 11 May | Latvia | 1-2 | Belarus |

| 11 May | Norway | 0-3 | Austria |

== Ranking and statistics ==
1999 IIHF World Championship winners

Czech Republic
2nd/8th title

=== Tournament awards ===
- Best players selected by the directorate:
  - Best Goaltender: (Sweden) Tommy Salo
  - Best Defenceman: (Czech Republic) František Kučera
  - Best Forward: (Finland) Saku Koivu
  - Most Valuable Player: (Finland) Teemu Selänne
- Media All-Star Team:
  - Goaltender: (Sweden) Tommy Salo
  - Defence: (Finland) Jere Karalahti, (Czech Republic) Pavel Kubina
  - Forwards: (Finland) Saku Koivu, (Czech Republic) Martin Ručinský, (Finland) Teemu Selänne

=== Final standings ===
The final standings of the tournament according to IIHF:

| 1st place, gold medalist(s) | Czech Republic |
| 2nd place, silver medalist(s) | Finland |
| 3rd place, bronze medalist(s) | Sweden |
| 4 | Canada |
| 5 | Russia |
| 6 | United States |
| 7 | Slovakia |
| 8 | Switzerland |
| 9 | Belarus |
| 10 | Austria |
| 11 | Latvia |
| 12 | Norway |
| 13 | Italy |
| 14 | Ukraine |
| 15 | France |
| 16 | Japan |

Places eleven through sixteen had to play in qualifying tournaments for entry into the 2000 tournament.

=== Scoring leaders ===
List shows the top skaters sorted by points, then goals.

| Player | GP | G | A | Pts | +/− | PIM | POS |
|---|---|---|---|---|---|---|---|
| (Finland) Saku Koivu | 10 | 4 | 12 | 16 | +8 | 4 | F |
| (Finland) Teemu Selänne | 11 | 3 | 8 | 11 | +6 | 16 | F |
| (Sweden) Markus Näslund | 10 | 6 | 4 | 10 | +7 | 0 | F |
| (Slovakia) Žigmund Pálffy | 6 | 5 | 5 | 10 | 0 | 6 | F |
| (Czech Republic) Jan Hlaváč | 10 | 5 | 5 | 10 | +4 | 7 | F |
| (Czech Republic) Martin Ručinský | 10 | 4 | 6 | 10 | +6 | 16 | F |
| (Russia) Alexei Yashin | 6 | 8 | 1 | 9 | +4 | 6 | F |
| (Sweden) Daniel Alfredsson | 10 | 4 | 5 | 9 | +5 | 8 | F |
| (Czech Republic) Viktor Ujčík | 10 | 6 | 2 | 8 | +3 | 12 | F |
| (Finland) Jere Karalahti | 12 | 5 | 3 | 8 | +5 | 2 | D |

=== Leading goaltenders ===
Only the top five goaltenders, based on save percentage, who have played 40% of their team's minutes are included in this list.

| Player | MIP | GA | GAA | SVS% | SO |
|---|---|---|---|---|---|
| (United States) Parris Duffus | 258 | 7 | 1.63 | .939 | 1 |
| (Belarus) Andrei Mezin | 360 | 10 | 1.67 | .931 | 1 |
| (Sweden) Tommy Salo | 424 | 13 | 1.84 | .921 | 0 |
| (Finland) Ari Sulander | 464 | 15 | 1.94 | .921 | 0 |
| (Canada) Ron Tugnutt | 328 | 11 | 2.01 | .915 | 0 |

== IIHF honors and awards ==
The 1999 IIHF Hall of Fame induction ceremony has held in Lillehammer during the World Championships. Roman Neumayer of Germany was given the Paul Loicq Award for outstanding contributions to international ice hockey.

IIHF Hall of Fame inductees

- Austria: Sepp Puschnig
- Canada: Roger Bourbonnais, Derek Holmes, Fran Huck, Barry MacKenzie, Jackie McLeod
- Czech Republic: Jiří Holík, Oldřich Machač, František Pospíšil
- Finland: Harry Lindblad, Lasse Oksanen, Jorma Valtonen
- Germany: Joachim Ziesche
- Italy: Enrico Calcaterra
- Japan: Yoshiaki Tsutsumi
- Norway: Tore Johannessen
- Russia: Arkady Chernyshev, Alexander Maltsev, Boris Mayorov
- Slovakia: Ján Starší
- Sweden: Sven Bergqvist, Rudolf Eklöw, Leif Holmqvist, Roland Stoltz
- United States: Herb Brooks, Jim Craig, Mike Curran, Mark Johnson, Hal Trumble

== See also ==
- 1999 World Junior Ice Hockey Championships
- 1999 IIHF Women's World Championship
