= Darin Kimble =

Canadian ice hockey player

- Born: November 22, 1968 (age 56); Lucky Lake, Saskatchewan, Canada
- Height: 6 ft 2 in (188 cm)
- Weight: 209 lb (95 kg; 14 st 13 lb)
- Position: Right wing
- Shot: Right
- Played for: Quebec Nordiques; St. Louis Blues; Boston Bruins; Chicago Blackhawks
- National team: Canada
- NHL draft: 66th overall, 1988; Quebec Nordiques
- Playing career: 1984–2002

Darin Kimble (born November 22, 1968) is a Canadian former ice hockey forward.

Kimble started his National Hockey League career with the Quebec Nordiques in 1989. He also played for the Chicago Blackhawks, St. Louis Blues, and Boston Bruins. He left the NHL after the 1995 season. Kimble amassed 1,082 penalty minutes in 311 NHL games.

Kimble currently resides in Granite City, Illinois, where he coaches a youth hockey program and is involved with player development.

== Career statistics ==
=== Regular season and playoffs ===
| | | | Regular season | | | | | Playoffs |
| Season | Team | League | GP | G | A | Pts | PIM | GP | G | A | Pts | PIM |
|---|---|---|---|---|---|---|---|---|---|---|---|---|
| 1984–85 | Swift Current Indians | SJHL | 59 | 28 | 32 | 60 | 264 | — | — | — | — | — |
| 1984–85 | Calgary Wranglers | WHL | — | — | — | — | — | 1 | 0 | 0 | 0 | 0 |
| 1985–86 | Calgary Wranglers | WHL | 37 | 14 | 8 | 22 | 93 | — | — | — | — | — |
| 1985–86 | New Westminster Bruins | WHL | 11 | 1 | 1 | 2 | 22 | — | — | — | — | — |
| 1985–86 | Brandon Wheat Kings | WHL | 15 | 1 | 6 | 7 | 39 | — | — | — | — | — |
| 1986–87 | Prince Albert Raiders | WHL | 68 | 17 | 13 | 30 | 190 | 8 | 1 | 5 | 6 | 22 |
| 1987–88 | Prince Albert Raiders | WHL | 67 | 35 | 36 | 71 | 307 | 8 | 2 | 2 | 4 | 32 |
| 1988–89 | Quebec Nordiques | NHL | 26 | 3 | 1 | 4 | 149 | — | — | — | — | — |
| 1988–89 | Halifax Citadels | AHL | 39 | 8 | 6 | 14 | 188 | — | — | — | — | — |
| 1989–90 | Quebec Nordiques | NHL | 44 | 5 | 5 | 10 | 185 | — | — | — | — | — |
| 1989–90 | Halifax Citadels | AHL | 18 | 6 | 6 | 12 | 37 | 6 | 1 | 1 | 2 | 61 |
| 1990–91 | Quebec Nordiques | NHL | 35 | 2 | 5 | 7 | 114 | — | — | — | — | — |
| 1990–91 | Halifax Citadels | AHL | 7 | 1 | 4 | 5 | 20 | — | — | — | — | — |
| 1990–91 | St. Louis Blues | NHL | 26 | 1 | 1 | 2 | 128 | 13 | 0 | 0 | 0 | 40 |
| 1991–92 | St. Louis Blues | NHL | 46 | 1 | 3 | 4 | 166 | 5 | 0 | 0 | 0 | 7 |
| 1992–93 | Boston Bruins | NHL | 55 | 7 | 3 | 10 | 177 | 4 | 0 | 0 | 0 | 2 |
| 1992–93 | Providence Bruins | AHL | 12 | 1 | 4 | 5 | 34 | — | — | — | — | — |
| 1993–94 | Chicago Blackhawks | NHL | 65 | 4 | 2 | 6 | 133 | 1 | 0 | 0 | 0 | 5 |
| 1994–95 | Chicago Blackhawks | NHL | 14 | 0 | 0 | 0 | 30 | — | — | — | — | — |
| 1995–96 | Indianapolis Ice | IHL | 9 | 1 | 0 | 1 | 15 | — | — | — | — | — |
| 1995–96 | Albany River Rats | AHL | 60 | 4 | 15 | 19 | 144 | 3 | 0 | 0 | 0 | 2 |
| 1996–97 | Manitoba Moose | IHL | 39 | 3 | 4 | 7 | 115 | — | — | — | — | — |
| 1996–97 | Kansas City Blades | IHL | 33 | 9 | 9 | 18 | 106 | 2 | 0 | 0 | 0 | 0 |
| 1997–98 | Kansas City Blades | IHL | 16 | 1 | 3 | 4 | 60 | — | — | — | — | — |
| 1997–98 | San Antonio Dragons | IHL | 56 | 6 | 14 | 20 | 143 | — | — | — | — | — |
| 1998–99 | Shreveport Mudbugs | WPHL | 9 | 1 | 2 | 3 | 13 | — | — | — | — | — |
| 1998–99 | Arkansas GlacierCats | WPHL | 51 | 9 | 17 | 26 | 133 | 3 | 0 | 0 | 0 | 8 |
| 1999–00 | Peoria Rivermen | ECHL | 10 | 0 | 0 | 0 | 21 | — | — | — | — | — |
| 1999–00 | Missouri River Otters | UHL | 24 | 10 | 13 | 23 | 49 | 3 | 1 | 0 | 1 | 4 |
| 2000–01 | Missouri River Otters | UHL | 62 | 29 | 22 | 51 | 114 | 4 | 0 | 3 | 3 | 4 |
| 2001–02 | Missouri River Otters | UHL | 56 | 13 | 22 | 35 | 95 | 4 | 1 | 1 | 2 | 8 |
| NHL totals | | | 311 | 23 | 20 | 43 | 1,082 | 23 | 0 | 0 | 0 | 54 |
