= Owen Nolan =

Canadian ice hockey player (born 1972)

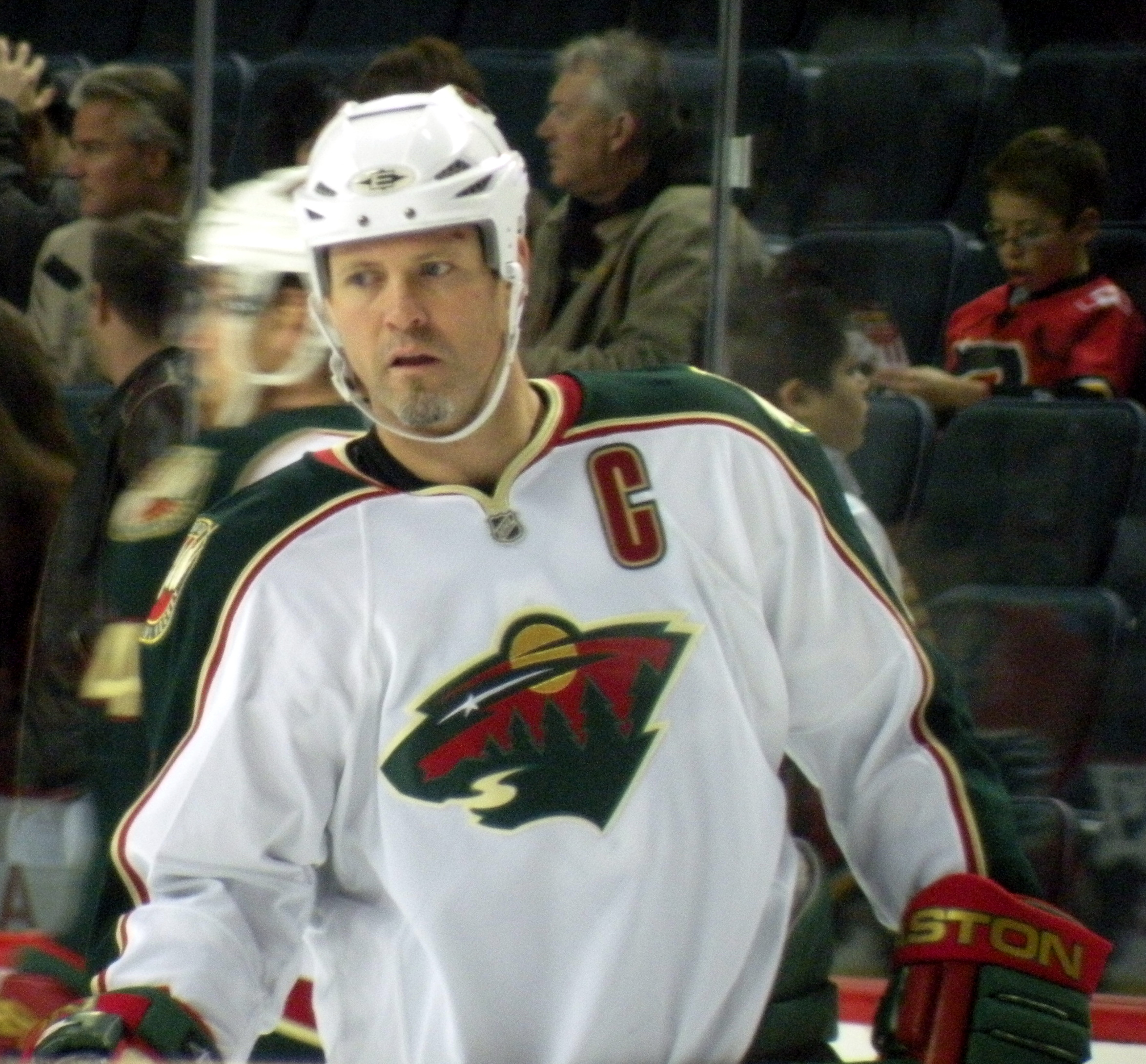
- Nolan with the Minnesota Wild in 2009
- Born: 12 February 1972 (age 54) Belfast, Northern Ireland
- Height: 6 ft 1 in (185 cm)
- Weight: 214 lb (97 kg; 15 st 4 lb)
- Position: Right wing
- Shot: Right
- Played for: Quebec Nordiques; Colorado Avalanche; San Jose Sharks; Toronto Maple Leafs; Phoenix Coyotes; Calgary Flames; Minnesota Wild; ZSC Lions
- National team: Canada
- NHL draft: 1st overall, 1990; Quebec Nordiques
- Playing career: 1990–2011

Owen Liam Nolan (born 12 February 1972) is a Canadian former professional ice hockey player. He was drafted first overall by the Quebec Nordiques in the 1990 NHL entry draft. During his 18-year National Hockey League (NHL) career, he played for the Nordiques, Colorado Avalanche, San Jose Sharks, Toronto Maple Leafs, Phoenix Coyotes, Calgary Flames, Minnesota Wild, as well as playing a season with the ZSC Lions of National League A. Born in Belfast, he was raised in Thorold, Ontario and played for Canada internationally. A five-time NHL All-Star, Nolan is widely known as a power forward.

== Playing career ==
=== Minor hockey ===
Nolan grew up in Thorold, Ontario playing minor ice hockey for Thorold in the OMHA. After playing A hockey for the Thorold bantam A's Nolan was selected in the second round of the 1988 OHL Priority Selection by the Cornwall Royals of the Ontario Hockey League.

=== Quebec Nordiques and San Jose Sharks ===
Nolan was drafted first overall by the Quebec Nordiques in the 1990 NHL entry draft. After a difficult rookie season at age 18 in 1990-91, when he tallied only 13 points, he burst out the next year with 42 goals and 73 points in 75 games. He was part of the franchise's transfer to Denver where the Nordiques were rebranded as the Colorado Avalanche. He began the 1995–96 season with four goals and four assists in nine games for the Avalanche before being traded to the San Jose Sharks for Sandis Ozoliņš on 26 October 1995. During his tenure with the Sharks he was named captain, and registered his best career year in 1999–2000, finishing with 84 points, and tied for second in the NHL with 44 goals. During the 2000 Stanley Cup playoffs, the eighth-seeded Sharks took out the first-seeded St. Louis Blues in seven games with Nolan leading the way with six goals. In game seven, Nolan scored with 10 seconds left in the first period from just past centre ice, beating goaltender Roman Turek to give the Sharks a 2–0 lead. The goal propelled them to a 3–1, game seven victory and first-round upset of the Blues.

=== Toronto Maple Leafs ===
Nolan was traded to the Toronto Maple Leafs just before the NHL trade deadline on 5 March 2003, for players Alyn McCauley and Brad Boyes, and Toronto's first-round pick in the 2003 NHL entry draft. However his performance in Toronto was disappointing, he suffered from a series of injuries and never played at the same level as he had in San Jose.

Nolan broke new ground in contract negotiations, having a clause put in that stated if the 2004–05 NHL season was cancelled, then he would gain a player option for an additional year in 2005–06. However, with the NHL Collective Bargaining Agreement in place, this option became a topic of debate. With the new NHL salary cap, the Maple Leafs deemed Nolan's salary too high, and refused to recognize Nolan as under contract. Nolan argued that the option was valid, that he would play, and be paid, for the Maple Leafs, and that he deserved to be paid during the 2004–05 NHL lockout due to injury. The Maple Leafs, who deemed Nolan as healthy just after the lockout, claimed that the injury was incurred off the ice and refused to pay Nolan's desired US$12 million. The case went to an arbitrator. This case was settled in 2006, however, the terms of the agreement by Leafs management and Nolan were not disclosed. In 2005–06, Nolan took time off for his injured knees to heal, training in San Jose. Before the push for the 2006 Stanley Cup playoffs, Nolan indicated that several teams (including San Jose) wanted to sign him, but he decided not to play because he wanted to be at 100 percent, both because he did not want to become re-injured and because he felt he owed his team that.

=== 2006–2011 ===
In August 2006, during free agency, Nolan contemplated joining many teams before signing a one-year, US$1 million contract with the Phoenix Coyotes. He scored 16 goals to go with 24 assists during his only year in Phoenix before becoming a free agent once again.

On 2 July 2007, Nolan signed with the Calgary Flames. On 22 October, Nolan played his 1,000th NHL game. On 30 January 2008, Nolan had his 11th career hat trick and first hat trick since 1999 in a 5–4 victory over former team, the San Jose Sharks. He was honoured as the game's first star as his hat trick included a short-handed goal and the game-winner, and Nolan also had a decisive victory in a second-period fight with Mike Grier. On 13 April, Nolan scored the game-winning goal in game three of the first round series of the 2008 Stanley Cup playoffs against his former team San Jose Sharks. It was his first playoff goal since 2002, when he was a member of the Sharks, and the 19th playoff goal of his 18-year career. He later scored a goal in Game 7 of that series, though it was part of a 5-3 loss.

On 6 July 2008, Nolan signed a two-year, $5.5 million contract with the Minnesota Wild. On 10 March 2009, Nolan scored his 400th (and 401st) goal of his NHL career with the Wild against the San Jose Sharks.

A free agent before the 2010–11 season, and intending to continue his NHL career, Nolan was unable to secure an NHL contract. With the beginning of the season underway, to garner interest and keep in game condition, Nolan signed a one-month contract with the Swiss team, ZSC Lions of the National League A, on 21 October 2010. He then signed an extension with ZSC Lions until 23 January 2011.

On 4 August 2011, Nolan signed a tryout contract with the Vancouver Canucks, returning to the NHL after a year in Switzerland. He was then released by the Canucks on 25 September 2011, admittedly due to issues with his family.

=== Retirement ===
On 7 February 2012, Nolan announced his retirement, at a press conference in San Jose five days before his 40th birthday. He was then chosen for a ceremonial puck drop in a game against the Calgary Flames on 8 February.

=== All-Star appearances ===
Nolan has played in the NHL All-Star Game in 1992, 1996, 1997, 2000 and 2002. He was the runner-up to Mark Recchi for the All-Star Game MVP in 1997, during which he performed a memorable 'called shot', pointing to the top corner of the net on a breakaway and promptly scoring there against Dominik Hašek to complete a hat trick.

== Personal life ==
Nolan is one of six players in NHL history to be born on the island of Ireland (Sid Finney, Bobby Kirk, Jim McFadden, Sammy McManus and Jack Riley are the others). Nolan's Catholic family lived on the Falls Road but moved to Thorold, Ontario, when he was seven months old to avoid religious persecution during the Troubles. He grew up playing baseball and soccer; it was not until he was nine that he began skating. He attended Denis Morris Catholic High School in St. Catharines, Ontario.

Nolan owns two restaurants called Britannia Arms in San Jose, California. He and his wife have two children.

== Career statistics ==
=== Regular season and playoffs ===
			Regular season					Playoffs
Season	Team	League	GP	G	A	Pts	PIM	GP	G	A	Pts	PIM
1987–88	Thorold Black Hawks	Bantam	28	53	32	85	24	—	—	—	—	—
1988–89	Cornwall Royals	OHL	62	34	25	59	213	18	5	11	16	41
1989–90	Cornwall Royals	OHL	58	51	60	111	240	6	7	5	12	26
1990–91	Halifax Citadels	AHL	6	4	4	8	11	—	—	—	—	—
1990–91	Quebec Nordiques	NHL	59	3	10	13	109	—	—	—	—	—
1991–92	Quebec Nordiques	NHL	75	42	31	73	183	—	—	—	—	—
1992–93	Quebec Nordiques	NHL	73	36	41	77	185	5	1	0	1	2
1993–94	Quebec Nordiques	NHL	6	2	2	4	8	—	—	—	—	—
1994–95	Quebec Nordiques	NHL	46	30	19	49	46	6	2	3	5	6
1995–96	Colorado Avalanche	NHL	9	4	4	8	9	—	—	—	—	—
1995–96	San Jose Sharks	NHL	72	29	32	61	137	—	—	—	—	—
1996–97	San Jose Sharks	NHL	72	31	32	63	155	—	—	—	—	—
1997–98	San Jose Sharks	NHL	75	14	27	41	144	6	2	2	4	26
1998–99	San Jose Sharks	NHL	78	19	26	45	129	6	1	0	1	6
1999–00	San Jose Sharks	NHL	78	44	40	84	110	10	8	2	10	6
2000–01	San Jose Sharks	NHL	57	24	25	49	75	6	1	1	2	8
2001–02	San Jose Sharks	NHL	75	23	43	66	93	12	3	6	9	8
2002–03	San Jose Sharks	NHL	61	22	20	42	91	—	—	—	—	—
2002–03	Toronto Maple Leafs	NHL	14	7	5	12	16	7	0	2	2	2
2003–04	Toronto Maple Leafs	NHL	65	19	29	48	110	—	—	—	—	—
2006–07	Phoenix Coyotes	NHL	76	16	24	40	56	—	—	—	—	—
2007–08	Calgary Flames	NHL	77	16	16	32	71	7	3	2	5	2
2008–09	Minnesota Wild	NHL	59	25	20	45	26	—	—	—	—	—
2009–10	Minnesota Wild	NHL	73	16	17	33	40	—	—	—	—	—
2010–11	ZSC Lions	NLA	24	7	19	26	53	5	2	2	4	2
NHL totals			1,200	422	463	885	1,793	65	21	18	39	66

=== International ===
Medal record

Ice hockey

Representing Canada

Olympic Games
Gold medal – first place	2002 Salt Lake City	

World Championships
Gold medal – first place	1997 Helsinki	

Year	Team	Event	Result	GP	G	A	Pts	PIM
1997	Canada	WC	1st place, gold medalist(s)	10	4	3	7	31
2002	Canada	OG	1st place, gold medalist(s)	6	0	3	3	2
Senior totals				16	4	6	10	33

== Awards and honours ==
Award	Year
OHL
Emms Family Award	1989
First All-Star Team	1990
Jim Mahon Memorial Trophy	1990
NHL
All-Star Game	1992, 1996, 1997, 2000, 2002

=== Other ===
- Bay Area Sports Hall of Fame inductee (2014)

== See also ==
- List of NHL players with 1,000 games played
- List of National Hockey League players born in the United Kingdom

Preceded by Mats Sundin	NHL first overall draft pick 1990	Succeeded by Eric Lindros
Preceded by Mats Sundin	Quebec Nordiques first-round draft pick 1990	Succeeded by Eric Lindros
Preceded by Todd Gill	San Jose Sharks captain 1998–2003	Succeeded by Rotating captains Mike Ricci
