= Stéphane Guérard =

Canadian ice hockey player

- Born: April 12, 1968 (age 58) Sainte-Élisabeth, Quebec, Canada
- Height: 6 ft 2 in (188 cm)
- Weight: 198 lb (90 kg; 14 st 2 lb)
- Position: Defence
- Shot: Left
- Played for: Quebec Nordiques
- NHL draft: 41st overall, 1986; Quebec Nordiques
- Playing career: 1987–1990

Stéphane Guérard (born April 12, 1968) is a Canadian former professional ice hockey defenceman who played 34 games in the National Hockey League for the Quebec Nordiques between 1987 and 1989. Guérard was born in Sainte-Élisabeth, Quebec.

== Career statistics ==
=== Regular season and playoffs ===
| | | | Regular season | | | | | Playoffs |
| Season | Team | League | GP | G | A | Pts | PIM | GP | G | A | Pts | PIM |
|---|---|---|---|---|---|---|---|---|---|---|---|---|
| 1984–85 | Laurentides-Lanaudiere Pionniers | QMAAA | 36 | 6 | 12 | 18 | 140 | — | — | — | — | — |
| 1985–86 | Shawinigan Cataractes | QMJHL | 59 | 4 | 16 | 20 | 167 | 3 | 1 | 1 | 2 | 0 |
| 1986–87 | Shawinigan Cataractes | QMJHL | 31 | 5 | 16 | 21 | 57 | 12 | 2 | 9 | 11 | 36 |
| 1987–88 | Quebec Nordiques | NHL | 30 | 0 | 0 | 0 | 34 | — | — | — | — | — |
| 1988–89 | Halifax Citadels | AHL | 37 | 1 | 9 | 10 | 140 | 4 | 0 | 0 | 0 | 8 |
| 1989–90 | Quebec Nordiques | NHL | 4 | 0 | 0 | 0 | 6 | — | — | — | — | — |
| 1989–90 | Halifax Citadels | AHL | 1 | 0 | 0 | 0 | 5 | — | — | — | — | — |
| 1996–97 | Voyageurs de Vanier | QSPHL | 1 | 0 | 0 | 0 | 0 | — | — | — | — | — |
| AHL totals | | | 38 | 1 | 9 | 10 | 145 | 4 | 0 | 0 | 0 | 8 |
| NHL totals | | | 34 | 0 | 0 | 0 | 40 | — | — | — | — | — |
