= Andy Rymsha =

Canadian ice hockey player

- Born: December 10, 1968 (age 56); St. Catharines, Ontario, Canada
- Height: 6 ft 3 in (191 cm)
- Weight: 210 lb (95 kg; 15 st 0 lb)
- Position: Right wing
- Shot: Left
- Played for: Quebec Nordiques; Bracknell Bees; CE Wien; HC Asiago; Kaufbeurer Adler; Starbulls Rosenheim; Sterzing/Vipiteno; SERC Wild Wings; Krefeld Pinguine
- NHL draft: 82nd overall, 1987; St. Louis Blues
- Playing career: 1990–2005

Andrew Anthony Rymsha (born December 10, 1968) is a Canadian former professional ice hockey player who played six games with the Quebec Nordiques of the National Hockey League during the 1991–92 season. The rest of his career, which lasted from 1990 to 2005, was spent in various minor leagues and Europe.

== Career statistics ==
=== Regular season and playoffs ===
			Regular season					Playoffs
Season	Team	League	GP	G	A	Pts	PIM	GP	G	A	Pts	PIM
1985–86	St. Catharines Falcons	GHL	39	6	13	19	170	—	—	—	—	—
1986–87	Western Michigan University	CCHA	41	7	12	19	170	—	—	—	—	—
1987–88	Western Michigan University	CCHA	42	5	6	11	114	—	—	—	—	—
1988–89	Western Michigan University	CCHA	35	3	4	7	139	—	—	—	—	—
1989–90	Western Michigan University	CCHA	37	1	10	11	108	—	—	—	—	—
1990–91	Halifax Citadels	AHL	12	1	2	3	22	—	—	—	—	—
1990–91	Peoria Rivermen	IHL	45	2	9	11	64	—	—	—	—	—
1991–92	Quebec Nordiques	NHL	6	0	0	0	23	—	—	—	—	—
1991–92	Halifax Citadels	AHL	44	4	7	11	54	—	—	—	—	—
1991–92	New Haven Nighthawks	AHL	16	0	5	5	20	—	—	—	—	—
1992–93	Halifax Citadels	AHL	43	4	6	10	62	—	—	—	—	—
1992–93	Canadian National Team	Intl	6	8	2	10	16	—	—	—	—	—
1993–94	Detroit Falcons	CoHL	48	24	38	62	48	—	—	—	—	—
1993–94	Bracknell Bees	BHL	14	16	13	29	40	—	—	—	—	—
1994–95	CE Wien	AUT	32	24	21	45	—	—	—	—	—	—
1994–95	HC Asiago	ITA	8	4	7	11	18	—	—	—	—	—
1995–96	San Francisco Spiders	IHL	76	33	37	70	84	4	0	2	2	8
1996–97	Kaufbeurer Adler	DEL	26	8	12	20	68	—	—	—	—	—
1996–97	HC Ajoie	NLB	13	6	6	12	58	—	—	—	—	—
1997–98	Starbulls Rosenheim	DEL	43	16	17	33	116	—	—	—	—	—
1997–98	Sterzing/Vipiteno	ITA	12	7	8	15	40	—	—	—	—	—
1998–99	SERC Wild Wings	DEL	50	23	16	39	245	—	—	—	—	—
1999–00	Krefeld Pinguine	DEL	49	11	9	20	192	3	1	0	1	50
2004–05	Flint Generals	UHL	6	0	0	0	10	—	—	—	—	—
DEL totals			168	58	54	112	621	3	1	0	1	50
NHL totals			6	0	0	0	23	—	—	—	—	—
