= Shawn Anderson =

Canadian ice hockey player (born 1968)

- Born: February 7, 1968 (age 58) Montreal, Quebec, Canada
- Height: 6 ft 1 in (185 cm)
- Weight: 200 lb (91 kg; 14 st 4 lb)
- Position: Defence
- Shot: Left
- Played for: Buffalo Sabres; Quebec Nordiques; Washington Capitals; Philadelphia Flyers
- National team: Canada
- NHL draft: 5th overall, 1986; Buffalo Sabres
- Playing career: 1986–2004

Shawn Stephen Anderson (born February 7, 1968) is a Canadian former professional ice hockey defenceman who played eight seasons in the National Hockey League (NHL) for the Buffalo Sabres, Quebec Nordiques, Washington Capitals and Philadelphia Flyers.

As a youth, he played in the 1980 and 1981 Quebec International Pee-Wee Hockey Tournaments with a minor ice hockey team from LaSalle, Quebec.

== Career statistics ==
			Regular season					Playoffs
Season	Team	League	GP	G	A	Pts	PIM	GP	G	A	Pts	PIM
1983–84	Lac St-Louis Lions	QMAAA	42	25	23	48	73	11	2	3	5	28
1984–85	Lac St-Louis Lions	QMAAA	42	23	42	65	100	11	9	11	20	16
1985–86	Canada	Intl	33	2	6	8	16	—	—	—	—	—
1985–86	University of Maine	HE	16	5	8	13	22	—	—	—	—	—
1986–87	Buffalo Sabres	NHL	41	2	11	13	23	—	—	—	—	—
1986–87	Rochester Americans	AHL	15	2	5	7	11	—	—	—	—	—
1987–88	Buffalo Sabres	NHL	23	1	2	3	17	—	—	—	—	—
1987–88	Rochester Americans	AHL	22	5	16	21	19	6	0	0	0	0
1988–89	Rochester Americans	AHL	31	5	14	19	24	—	—	—	—	—
1988–89	Buffalo Sabres	NHL	33	2	10	12	18	5	0	1	1	4
1989–90	Buffalo Sabres	NHL	16	1	3	4	8	—	—	—	—	—
1989–90	Rochester Americans	AHL	39	2	16	18	41	9	1	0	1	8
1990–91	Quebec Nordiques	NHL	31	3	10	13	21	—	—	—	—	—
1990–91	Halifax Citadels	AHL	4	0	1	1	2	—	—	—	—	—
1991–92	ES Weißwasser	DEU.2	38	7	15	22	83	—	—	—	—	—
1992–93	Baltimore Skipjacks	AHL	10	1	5	6	8	—	—	—	—	—
1992–93	Washington Capitals	NHL	60	2	6	8	18	6	0	0	0	0
1993–94	Washington Capitals	NHL	50	0	9	9	12	8	1	0	1	12
1994–95	Hershey Bears	AHL	31	9	21	30	18	6	2	3	5	19
1994–95	Philadelphia Flyers	NHL	1	0	0	0	0	—	—	—	—	—
1995–96	Milwaukee Admirals	IHL	79	22	39	61	68	5	0	7	7	0
1996–97	Utah Grizzlies	IHL	31	2	12	14	21	—	—	—	—	—
1996–97	Manitoba Moose	IHL	17	2	7	9	5	—	—	—	—	—
1996–97	Wedemark Scorpions	DEL	8	1	4	5	4	—	—	—	—	—
1997–98	Revierlöwen Oberhausen	DEL	30	5	12	17	43	3	0	2	2	4
1998–99	Klagenfurt AC	AUT	54	20	14	34	44	—	—	—	—	—
1999–2000	Augsburger Panther	DEL	34	3	11	14	14	2	1	0	1	2
1999–2000	Michigan K-Wings	IHL	6	0	2	2	2	—	—	—	—	—
2000–01	Iserlohn Roosters	DEL	56	12	33	45	52	—	—	—	—	—
2001–02	Nürnberg Ice Tigers	DEL	48	4	18	22	30	4	0	0	0	2
2002–03	Nürnberg Ice Tigers	DEL	48	9	15	24	38	5	0	3	3	8
2003–04	Augsburger Panther	DEL	27	2	6	8	18	—	—	—	—	—
NHL totals			255	11	51	62	117	19	1	1	2	16
AHL totals			152	24	78	102	123	21	3	3	6	27
DEL totals			251	36	99	135	199	14	1	5	6	16

Preceded by Calle Johansson	Buffalo Sabres first-round draft pick 1986	Succeeded by Pierre Turgeon
