= Mike Hough =

Canadian ice hockey player (born 1963)

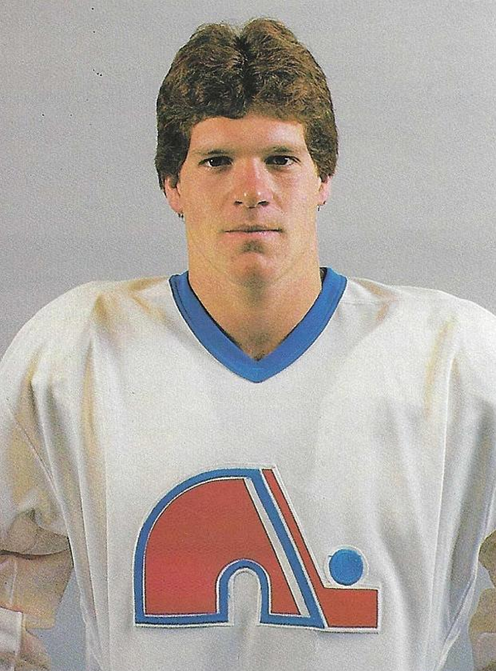
- Hough in 1985 photo
- Born: February 6, 1963 (age 63) Montreal, Quebec, Canada
- Height: 6 ft 1 in (185 cm)
- Weight: 192 lb (87 kg; 13 st 10 lb)
- Position: Left wing
- Shot: Left
- Played for: Quebec Nordiques; Florida Panthers; New York Islanders
- NHL draft: 181st overall, 1982; Quebec Nordiques
- Playing career: 1983–1999

Michael Lloyd Hough (/ˈhʌf/ HUF) (born February 6, 1963) is a Canadian former professional ice hockey player who played thirteen seasons in the National Hockey League from 1986 until 1999.

== Biography ==
Hough was born in Montreal, Quebec. As a youth, he played in the 1976 Quebec International Pee-Wee Hockey Tournament with a minor ice hockey team from Toronto.

Hough was drafted 181st overall by the Quebec Nordiques in the 1982 NHL entry draft. He played 707 career NHL games, scoring 100 goals and 156 assists for 256 points. He had his best season in 1991–92 with 16 goals and 22 assists for 38 points, despite being sidelined for a month with a broken thumb. He was also the Nordiques' captain during that season.

Quebec traded Hough to the Washington Capitals in exchange for Reggie Savage and Paul MacDermid on June 20, 1993. Four days later, Washington left Hough unprotected for the 1993 NHL Expansion Draft, and he was claimed by the Florida Panthers, with whom he played four seasons. He scored the last goal in the Spectrum, in double overtime of the fifth game of the Panthers' semifinals series against the Philadelphia Flyers in 1996. He ended his NHL career with the New York Islanders in 1999 after signing with them as a free agent on July 2, 1997.

== Career statistics ==
			Regular season					Playoffs
Season	Team	League	GP	G	A	Pts	PIM	GP	G	A	Pts	PIM
1979–80	Toronto Marlboros	MTHL	44	20	50	70	—	—	—	—	—	—
1980–81	Dixie Beehives	OPJHL	24	15	20	35	84	—	—	—	—	—
1981–82	Kitchener Rangers	OHL	58	14	34	48	172	14	4	1	5	16
1981–82	Kitchener Rangers	M-Cup	—	—	—	—	—	5	1	1	2	11
1982–83	Kitchener Rangers	OHL	61	17	27	44	156	12	5	4	9	30
1983–84	Fredericton Express	AHL	69	11	16	27	142	1	0	0	0	7
1984–85	Fredericton Express	AHL	76	21	27	48	49	6	1	1	2	2
1984–85	Quebec Nordiques	NHL	—	—	—	—	—	2	0	0	0	0
1985–86	Fredericton Express	AHL	74	21	33	54	68	6	0	3	3	8
1986–87	Quebec Nordiques	NHL	56	6	8	14	79	9	0	3	3	26
1986–87	Fredericton Express	AHL	10	1	3	4	20	—	—	—	—	—
1987–88	Quebec Nordiques	NHL	17	3	2	5	2	—	—	—	—	—
1987–88	Fredericton Express	AHL	46	16	25	41	133	15	4	8	12	55
1988–89	Quebec Nordiques	NHL	46	9	10	19	39	—	—	—	—	—
1988–89	Halifax Citadels	AHL	22	11	10	21	87	—	—	—	—	—
1989–90	Quebec Nordiques	NHL	43	13	13	26	84	—	—	—	—	—
1990–91	Quebec Nordiques	NHL	63	13	20	33	111	—	—	—	—	—
1991–92	Quebec Nordiques	NHL	61	16	22	38	77	—	—	—	—	—
1992–93	Quebec Nordiques	NHL	77	8	22	30	69	6	0	1	1	2
1993–94	Florida Panthers	NHL	78	6	23	29	62	—	—	—	—	—
1994–95	Florida Panthers	NHL	48	6	7	13	38	—	—	—	—	—
1995–96	Florida Panthers	NHL	64	7	16	23	37	22	4	1	5	8
1996–97	Florida Panthers	NHL	69	8	6	14	48	5	1	0	1	2
1997–98	New York Islanders	NHL	74	5	7	12	27	—	—	—	—	—
1998–99	Utah Grizzlies	IHL	26	5	7	12	8	—	—	—	—	—
1998–99	New York Islanders	NHL	11	0	0	0	2	—	—	—	—	—
1998–99	Lowell Lock Monsters	AHL	11	0	3	3	21	—	—	—	—	—
NHL totals			707	100	156	256	675	44	5	5	10	38

Preceded by Steven Finn; Joe Sakic	Quebec Nordiques captain 1991–92	Succeeded by Joe Sakic
