= Stéphane Charbonneau =

Canadian ice hockey player

- Born: June 27, 1970 (age 55) Sainte-Adèle, Quebec, Canada
- Height: 6 ft 2 in (188 cm)
- Weight: 195 lb (88 kg; 13 st 13 lb)
- Position: Right wing
- Shot: Right
- Played for: Quebec Nordiques
- NHL draft: Undrafted
- Playing career: 1991–1997

Stéphane Charbonneau (born June 27, 1970) is a Canadian former professional ice hockey right winger. He played 2 games in the National Hockey League during the 1991–92 season. The rest of his career, which lasted from 1991 to 1997, was spent in the minor leagues.

== Early life ==
Charbonneau was born in Sainte-Adèle, Quebec. He played junior hockey with the Hull Olympiques, Shawinigan Cataractes, and Chicoutimi Saguenéens.

== Career ==
During his career, Charbonneau played for the Quebec Nordiques of the National Hockey League (NHL). After retiring, he worked as the head varsity ice hockey coach at Garnet Valley High School.

== Career statistics ==
=== Regular season and playoffs ===
			Regular season					Playoffs
Season	Team	League	GP	G	A	Pts	PIM	GP	G	A	Pts	PIM
1986–87	Laval-Laurentides-Lanaudière Régents	QMAAA	42	17	26	43	24	8	4	5	9	2
1987–88	Hull Olympiques	QMJHL	51	10	20	30	70	11	5	8	13	12
1988–89	Hull Olympiques	QMJHL	64	23	29	52	142	9	2	2	4	22
1989–90	Shawinigan Cataractes	QMJHL	62	37	58	95	154	6	4	2	6	11
1990–91	Shawinigan Cataractes	QMJHL	6	4	3	7	2	—	—	—	—	—
1990–91	Chicoutimi Sagueneens	QMJHL	55	37	30	67	109	17	13	9	22	43
1990–91	Chicoutimi Sagueneens	M-Cup	—	—	—	—	—	4	2	3	5	8
1991–92	Quebec Nordiques	NHL	2	0	0	0	0	—	—	—	—	—
1991–92	Halifax Citadels	AHL	64	22	25	47	183	—	—	—	—	—
1992–93	Halifax Citadels	AHL	56	18	20	38	125	—	—	—	—	—
1993–94	Erie Panthers	ECHL	23	22	8	30	130	—	—	—	—	—
1993–94	Phoenix Roadrunners	IHL	32	7	6	13	43	—	—	—	—	—
1994–95	Cornwall Aces	AHL	1	0	1	1	0	—	—	—	—	—
1994–95	Fort Wayne Komets	IHL	4	0	0	0	8	—	—	—	—	—
1994–95	Portland Pirates	AHL	7	3	5	8	0	—	—	—	—	—
1994–95	Erie Panthers	ECHL	64	50	41	91	129	—	—	—	—	—
1995–96	Portland Pirates	AHL	25	5	3	8	23	1	0	0	0	0
1995–96	Flint Generals	CoHL	1	1	0	1	0	—	—	—	—	—
1996–97	Portland Pirates	AHL	9	1	0	1	2	—	—	—	—	—
1996–97	Baton Rouge Kingfish	ECHL	43	19	24	43	63	—	—	—	—	—
1996–97	Mississippi Sea Wolves	ECHL	13	8	6	14	14	3	2	0	2	18
AHL totals			160	49	54	103	333	1	0	0	0	0
ECHL totals			143	99	79	178	336	3	2	0	2	18
NHL totals			2	0	0	0	0	—	—	—	—	—
