= Martin Ručinský =

Czech ice hockey player (born 1971)

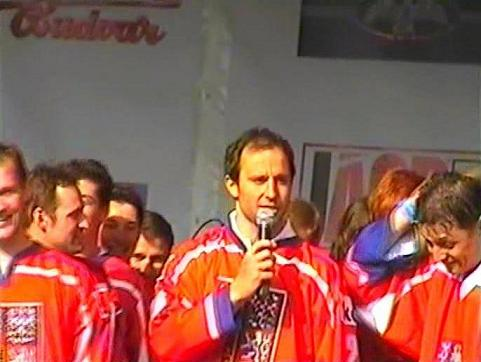
- Martin Ručinský, 2005
- Born: 11 March 1971 (age 55) Most, Czechoslovakia
- Height: 6 ft 1 in (185 cm)
- Weight: 205 lb (93 kg; 14 st 9 lb)
- Position: Left wing
- Shot: Left
- Played for: HC Litvínov; Edmonton Oilers; Quebec Nordiques; HC Vsetín; Colorado Avalanche; Montreal Canadiens; Dallas Stars; New York Rangers; St. Louis Blues; Vancouver Canucks; HC Sparta Praha
- National team: Czechoslovakia and Czech Republic
- NHL draft: 20th overall, 1991; Edmonton Oilers
- Playing career: 1988–2015

Martin Ručinský (Czech pronunciation: [ˈmarcɪn ˈrutʃiːnskiː]; born 11 March 1971) is a Czech former professional ice hockey player who played 16 seasons in the National Hockey League (NHL). Ručínský was drafted by the Edmonton Oilers in the first round as the 20th overall selection in the 1991 NHL entry draft on 22 June 1991.

Ručinský led the Montreal Canadiens in 1998–99 with 17 goals. It was the first time since the 1940–41 season, that the Canadiens did not have at least one twenty-goal scorer. He was the last player for the Quebec Nordiques still active in professional hockey prior to his retirement in 2015.

Ručinský was inducted into the Czech Ice Hockey Hall of Fame on 22 January 2019.

== Transactions ==
- 22 June 1991 – Edmonton Oilers' first-round draft choice (20th overall - from the Los Angeles Kings) in the 1991 NHL entry draft.
- 10 March 1992 – Traded by the Edmonton Oilers to the Quebec Nordiques in exchange for Ron Tugnutt and Brad Zavisha.
- 21 June 1995 – Rights transferred to the Colorado Avalanche after Quebec relocated.
- 6 December 1995 – Traded by the Colorado Avalanche, along with Andrei Kovalenko and Jocelyn Thibault, to the Montreal Canadiens in exchange for Patrick Roy and Mike Keane.
- 21 November 2001 – Traded by the Montreal Canadiens, along with Benoît Brunet, to the Dallas Stars in exchange for Donald Audette and Shaun Van Allen.
- 12 March 2002 – Traded by the Dallas Stars, along with Roman Lyashenko to the New York Rangers in exchange for Manny Malhotra and Barrett Heisten.
- 30 October 2002 – Signed as a free agent with the St. Louis Blues.
- 28 August 2003 – Signed as a free agent with the New York Rangers.
- 9 March 2004 – Traded by the New York Rangers to the Vancouver Canucks in exchange for R. J. Umberger and Martin Grenier.
- 3 August 2005 – Signed as a free agent with the New York Rangers.
- 2 August 2006 – Signed as a free agent with the St. Louis Blues.
- 23 July 2008 - Signed as a free agent with Sparta Prague of the Czech Extraliga.
- 16 July 2015 - Announced his retirement from professional hockey.

== Career statistics ==
=== Regular season and playoffs ===
			Regular season					Playoffs
Season	Team	League	GP	G	A	Pts	PIM	GP	G	A	Pts	PIM
1988–89	TJ CHZ Litvínov	TCH	3	1	0	1	2	—	—	—	—	—
1989–90	TJ CHZ Litvínov	TCH	39	12	6	18	—	8	5	3	8	—
1990–91	HC CHZ Litvínov	TCH	49	23	18	41	69	7	1	3	4	10
1991–92	Edmonton Oilers	NHL	2	0	0	0	0	—	—	—	—	—
1991–92	Cape Breton Oilers	AHL	35	11	12	23	34	—	—	—	—	—
1991–92	Quebec Nordiques	NHL	4	1	1	2	2	—	—	—	—	—
1991–92	Halifax Citadels	AHL	7	1	1	2	6	—	—	—	—	—
1992–93	Quebec Nordiques	NHL	77	18	30	48	51	6	1	1	2	4
1993–94	Quebec Nordiques	NHL	60	9	23	32	58	—	—	—	—	—
1994–95	HC Litvínov, s.r.o.	ELH	13	12	10	22	54	—	—	—	—	—
1994–95	Quebec Nordiques	NHL	20	3	6	9	14	—	—	—	—	—
1995–96	HC Dadák Vsetín	ELH	1	1	1	2	0	—	—	—	—	—
1995–96	Colorado Avalanche	NHL	22	4	11	15	14	—	—	—	—	—
1995–96	Montreal Canadiens	NHL	56	25	35	60	54	—	—	—	—	—
1996–97	Montreal Canadiens	NHL	70	28	27	55	62	5	0	0	0	4
1997–98	Montreal Canadiens	NHL	78	21	32	53	84	10	3	0	3	4
1998–99	HC Litvínov, a.s.	ELH	3	2	2	4	0	—	—	—	—	—
1998–99	Montreal Canadiens	NHL	73	17	17	34	50	—	—	—	—	—
1999–2000	Montreal Canadiens	NHL	80	25	24	49	70	—	—	—	—	—
2000–01	Montreal Canadiens	NHL	57	16	22	38	66	—	—	—	—	—
2001–02	Montreal Canadiens	NHL	18	2	6	8	12	—	—	—	—	—
2001–02	Dallas Stars	NHL	42	6	11	17	24	—	—	—	—	—
2001–02	New York Rangers	NHL	15	3	10	13	6	—	—	—	—	—
2002–03	HC Chemopetrol, a.s.	ELH	2	1	0	1	2	—	—	—	—	—
2002–03	St. Louis Blues	NHL	61	16	14	30	38	7	4	2	6	4
2003–04	New York Rangers	NHL	69	13	29	42	62	—	—	—	—	—
2003–04	Vancouver Canucks	NHL	13	1	2	3	10	7	1	1	2	6
2004–05	HC Chemopetrol, a.s.	ELH	38	15	26	41	87	—	—	—	—	—
2005–06	New York Rangers	NHL	52	16	39	55	56	2	0	1	1	2
2006–07	St. Louis Blues	NHL	52	12	21	33	48	—	—	—	—	—
2007–08	St. Louis Blues	NHL	40	5	11	16	40	—	—	—	—	—
2008–09	HC Sparta Praha	ELH	19	5	4	9	26	—	—	—	—	—
2009–10	HC Sparta Praha	ELH	52	12	10	22	82	7	2	3	5	8
2010–11	HC Sparta Praha	ELH	9	0	2	2	6	—	—	—	—	—
2010–11	HC Verva Litvínov	ELH	23	9	11	20	36	—	—	—	—	—
2011–12	HC Verva Litvínov	ELH	45	16	9	25	94	—	—	—	—	—
2012–13	HC Verva Litvínov	ELH	33	13	14	27	42	7	1	3	4	12
2013–14	HC Verva Litvínov	ELH	45	12	15	27	44	—	—	—	—	—
2014–15	HC Verva Litvínov	ELH	51	19	35	54	64	17	3	8	11	10
NHL totals			961	241	371	612	821	37	9	5	14	24
ELH totals			334	117	139	256	537	45	7	19	26	56

=== International ===
Medal record

Ice hockey

Representing Czech Republic

Olympic Games
Gold medal – first place	1998 Nagano	
Bronze medal – third place	2006 Torino	

World Championships
Gold medal – first place	1999 Oslo	
Gold medal – first place	2001 Nuremberg	
Gold medal – first place	2005 Vienna	

Representing Czechoslovakia

World Junior Championships
Bronze medal – third place	1991 Saskatchewan	

Year	Team	Event	Result	GP	G	A	Pts	PIM
1991	Czechoslovakia	WJC	3rd place, bronze medalist(s)	7	9	5	14	2
1991	Czechoslovakia	CC	6th	4	0	2	2	4
1994	Czech Republic	WC	7th	6	2	2	4	8
1996	Czech Republic	WCH	8th	3	0	0	0	2
1998	Czech Republic	OG	1st place, gold medalist(s)	6	3	1	4	4
1999	Czech Republic	WC	1st place, gold medalist(s)	12	4	6	10	16
2001	Czech Republic	WC	1st place, gold medalist(s)	9	2	4	6	30
2002	Czech Republic	OG	7th	4	0	3	3	2
2004	Czech Republic	WC	5th	7	5	4	9	6
2004	Czech Republic	WCH	3rd place, bronze medalist(s)	4	1	1	2	10
2005	Czech Republic	WC	1st place, gold medalist(s)	9	2	4	6	22
2006	Czech Republic	OG	3rd place, bronze medalist(s)	8	1	3	4	0
Junior totals				7	9	5	14	2
Senior totals				70	20	30	50	102

Awards and achievements
Preceded by Tyler Wright	Edmonton Oilers first-round draft pick 1991 (second of two)	Succeeded by Joe Hulbig
