= Ron Tugnutt =

Canadian ice hockey player (born 1967)

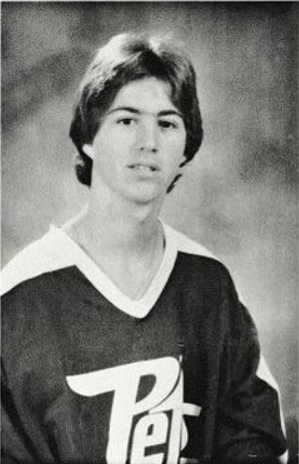
- Tugnutt with the Peterborough Petes in 1984
- Born: October 22, 1967 (age 59) Scarborough, Ontario, Canada
- Height: 5 ft 11 in (180 cm)
- Weight: 165 lb (75 kg; 11 st 11 lb)
- Position: Goaltender
- Caught: Left
- Played for: Quebec Nordiques; Edmonton Oilers; Mighty Ducks of Anaheim; Montreal Canadiens; Ottawa Senators; Pittsburgh Penguins; Columbus Blue Jackets; Dallas Stars
- National team: Canada
- NHL draft: 81st overall, 1986; Quebec Nordiques
- Playing career: 1987–2004

Ronald Frederick Bradley Tugnutt (born October 22, 1967) is a Canadian former professional ice hockey goaltender. Tugnutt played several seasons in the National Hockey League (NHL) with the Quebec Nordiques, Edmonton Oilers, Mighty Ducks of Anaheim, Montreal Canadiens, Ottawa Senators, Pittsburgh Penguins, Columbus Blue Jackets, and Dallas Stars. While a member of the Nordiques on March 21, 1991, Tugnutt set a modern-day NHL record for most saves in a regular-season game when he stopped 70 of 73 shots in a 3–3 tie with the Boston Bruins.

After retiring as a player, Tugnutt served as the president, governor, and coach of the Central Canada Hockey League's Kemptville 73's.

== Career ==
=== Early years ===
Tugnutt was born in Scarborough, Ontario. As a youth, he played in the 1980 Quebec International Pee-Wee Hockey Tournament with a minor ice hockey team from Toronto.

Tugnutt played three seasons with the Peterborough Petes in the Ontario Hockey League, and won the F. W. "Dinty" Moore Trophy for the rookie with the best goals against average, followed by the Dave Pinkney Trophy for Top Team Goaltending, and was named to the OHL All Star team in 1987.

=== NHL beginnings ===
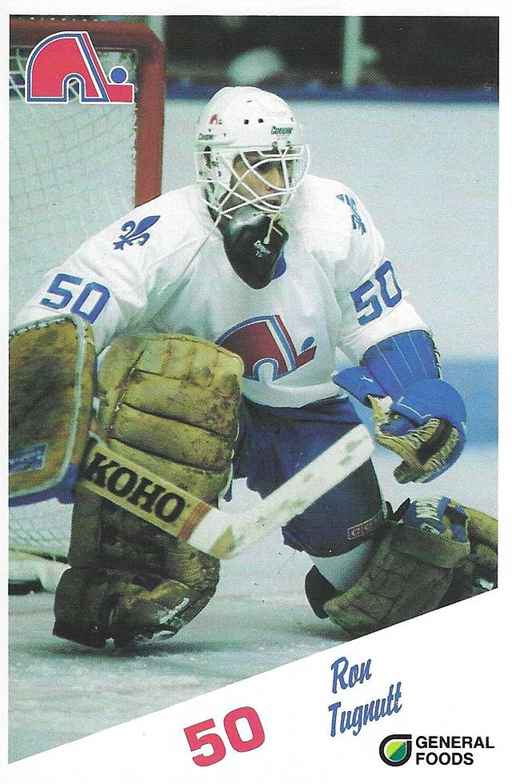
1987-88 card of Tugnutt for Quebec Nordiques

He was drafted by the Quebec Nordiques in the fourth round (81st overall) of the 1986 NHL entry draft. He was primarily used as a backup during his first three pro seasons, bouncing up and down between the Halifax Citadels of the American Hockey League (AHL) and the parent club in Quebec City. During 1990–91 NHL season, Tugnutt played what would be a career-high 56 games for Quebec and established himself as a quality NHL starter despite playing for what was then the worst team in the league.

On March 21, 1991, Tugnutt stopped 70 of 73 shots to earn his team a 3–3 tie against the Boston Bruins, the highest number of saves made in a regular season game in NHL history. His performance evoked such respect that after it was over, several Bruins players skated over to congratulate Tugnutt while the Boston fans gave him a standing ovation.

In the midst of an inconsistent 1991–92 NHL season, and with the emergence of Stéphane Fiset as the Nordiques' number one goaltender, Tugnutt was demoted to the Nordiques' AHL affiliate. In exchange for Martin Ručinský, he was soon traded to the Edmonton Oilers to serve as Bill Ranford's backup. Tugnutt remained in this role until he was selected by the Mighty Ducks of Anaheim in the 1993 expansion draft. In Anaheim, he split goaltending duties with Guy Hebert.

Anaheim quickly settled on Hebert as their future starter, and the Montreal Canadiens decided that André Racicot and Les Kuntar were not adequately serving as Patrick Roy's backup, so Tugnutt was acquired by the Canadiens in exchange for Stéphan Lebeau. Tugnutt's performance suffered; for Anaheim he had posted a .908 save percentage in 28 games, but for Montreal, he posted an .860 save percentage in eight games during the 1993–94 season.

During the 1994 Stanley Cup playoffs against the Bruins, Tugnutt started a game as Patrick Roy was recuperating from an appendectomy, but he did not return to the Canadiens for the 1995–96 season, and was replaced by Patrick Labrecque. These experiences caused Tugnutt to ponder retirement.

=== Career breakthrough ===
In 1995, Tugnutt signed a one-year deal with the Washington Capitals, and subsequently spent the entire 1995–96 season with their AHL affiliate, the Portland Pirates. He was productive in Portland, helping lead the Pirates to the Calder Cup Finals.

This strong performance caught the attention of the Ottawa Senators. Goaltending coach Phil Myre helped Tugnutt work on fundamentals, and gained confidence and improved his game each season. While in Ottawa, he went from fighting for the backup position with Mike Bales to splitting duties with starter Damian Rhodes the next two seasons, and became the team's undisputed starting goaltender by 1999.

On April 12, 1997, Tugnutt shutout the Buffalo Sabres in the final game of the regular season. Tugnutt's father had just died and immediately following the win Tugnutt pointed to the rafters to signify the win was for his father, in what became an iconic image of Tugnutt. This win propelled the Senators to their first playoff berth.

In 1998–99, Tugnutt had the best season of his career, and one of the best by an NHL goaltender in the current era. He posted a league-best goals against average of 1.79, placed second in the league in save percentage at .925, had a career high in wins, and tied a career high in shutouts. This outstanding play, and an injury to Curtis Joseph, gave Tugnutt the opportunity to play in the 1999 NHL All-Star Game.

The next season, Rhodes was shipped to the expansion Atlanta Thrashers, giving Tugnutt sole possession of the starting job. However, he was unable to match his previous season and Ottawa traded him to the Pittsburgh Penguins for an experienced playoff goaltender, Tom Barrasso.

After arriving in Pittsburgh, Tugnutt took over the starting job from Jean-Sébastien Aubin and helped lead Pittsburgh deep into the playoffs. Tugnutt was in goal for the May 4, 2000, playoff game against the Philadelphia Flyers in which he made 70 saves on 72 shots. The 72nd shot was a goal scored by Keith Primeau of the Flyers at 12:01 of the fifth overtime, winning the game for Philadelphia 2–1, the longest NHL game since the 1930s.

Following his performance with Pittsburgh, Tugnutt became one of the most sought-after free agent goaltenders on the market. Both Ottawa and Pittsburgh attempted to re-sign Tugnutt but were unable to match the lucrative contract offered by the expansion Columbus Blue Jackets.

During Columbus' inaugural season, Tugnutt was considered their backbone. Tugnutt's 22 wins broke another NHL record for most wins on an expansion team, and his .917 save percentage was among the best in the league.

The team's second season was not as impressive as the first. Tugnutt battled injuries and ended up sharing time with young netminder Marc Denis. General Manager Doug MacLean gave Denis the opportunity to be the sole starter on the club, and traded Tugnutt to the Dallas Stars.

In 2002–03 Tugnutt was the backup to Marty Turco. In January 2003, Turco suffered an ankle injury that allowed Tugnutt to start almost 20 straight games, and he posted back to back shutouts during that stretch. For the season, he played 31 games and posted a 15-10-5 record including four shutouts.

The 2003–04 season was possibly Tugnutt's toughest in the NHL, as by January he only received three starts. He was sent down to the minors for the first time in almost ten years to get some playing time with the Utah Grizzlies. Just five games in, Tugnutt pulled his groin and was out until after the All Star break. Soon after, he was recalled to the Dallas Stars. After two solid starts, one of which was a shutout, Tugnutt received a break when Turco received a four-game suspension. He retired following the 2003–04 season.

=== Post-retirement ===
After the lockout, Tugnutt joined CBC as a color commentator for Hockey Night in Canada. From 2008–09 to 2009–10, Tugnutt served as the goaltending coach for the OHL's Oshawa Generals and was a goaltending consultant for the 2010 Canadian World Junior team. Tugnutt's contract with the Generals was not renewed after a major front office shakeup in May 2010. Tugnutt joined the Peterborough Petes coaching staff for the 2010–11 season. Tugnutt was a consultant with Hockey Canada until 2013 when that relationship ended.

Tugnutt then purchased the Kemptville 73's, a Junior "A" ice hockey team, where he served as head coach, president and governor. Tugnutt sold the team in 2017 and cut his ties with the team. Tugnutt sold the team to an ownership group led by former teammate Jason York.

== Off the ice ==
Tugnutt is married to Lisa, and the couple have two sons, Jacob and Matthew. The family resides on Stoney Lake near Peterborough, Ontario.

Tugnutt enjoys boating and traveling. In the summer of 1998, Tugnutt was involved in a severe boating accident, and it was suspected that he might miss out on training camp. Tugnutt healed and had the best season of his career, breaking the modern-day NHL record for lowest G.A.A. and coming second in the league in save percentage.

== Honours and records ==
- Modern-day record holder for most saves in a regular season game non-loss (stopped 70 of 73 shots in a 3–3 tie with the Boston Bruins; March 21, 1991).
- Holds Mighty Ducks of Anaheim record for most saves in a regular season game with 46, set against the Edmonton Oilers on November 21, 1993).
- Tied with Dominik Hašek for Ottawa Senators highest regular season save percentage.
- Leader in save percentage for the 1999–2000 Playoffs.
- Holds Pittsburgh Penguins record for highest save percentage in the playoffs.
- Holds NHL record for being the only goaltender to have the first ever wins for 2 expansion teams - Columbus and Anaheim.

== International play ==
After a disappointing four-game sweep in the NHL playoffs, Tugnutt was more than excited to play for Team Canada in the 1999 World Hockey Championships. The semi-final game was against the Czech Republic in which Canada lost after the game went undecided in overtime, ending in a shootout. This was Tugnutt's second appearance on Team Canada, also playing for them in 1993.

== Career statistics ==
=== Regular season and playoffs ===
			Regular season									Playoffs
Season	Team	League	GP	W	L	T	MIN	GA	SO	GAA	SV%	GP	W	L	MIN	GA	SO	GAA	SV%
1983–84	Toronto Red Wings	MTHL	34	—	—	—	1690	75	3	2.67	—	—	—	—	—	—	—	—	—
1983–84	Weston Dukes	MetJHL	1	—	—	—	20	2	0	6.00	—	—	—	—	—	—	—	—	—
1984–85	Peterborough Petes	OHL	18	7	4	2	938	59	0	3.77	—	—	—	—	—	—	—	—	—
1985–86	Peterborough Petes	OHL	26	18	7	0	1543	74	1	2.88	—	3	2	0	133	6	0	2.70	—
1986–87	Peterborough Petes	OHL	31	21	7	2	1891	88	2	2.79	—	6	3	3	374	21	1	3.36	—
1987–88	Fredericton Express	AHL	34	20	9	4	1964	118	1	3.60	.890	4	1	2	204	11	0	3.23	—
1987–88	Quebec Nordiques	NHL	6	2	3	0	284	16	0	3.38	.870	—	—	—	—	—	—	—	—
1988–89	Halifax Citadels	AHL	24	14	7	2	1368	79	1	3.46	.897	—	—	—	—	—	—	—	—
1988–89	Quebec Nordiques	NHL	26	10	10	3	1367	82	0	3.60	.892	—	—	—	—	—	—	—	—
1989–90	Halifax Citadels	AHL	6	1	5	0	366	23	0	3.77	.900	—	—	—	—	—	—	—	—
1989–90	Quebec Nordiques	NHL	35	5	24	3	1978	152	0	4.61	.859	—	—	—	—	—	—	—	—
1990–91	Halifax Citadels	AHL	2	0	1	0	100	8	0	4.80	.814	—	—	—	—	—	—	—	—
1990–91	Quebec Nordiques	NHL	56	12	29	10	3144	212	0	4.04	.886	—	—	—	—	—	—	—	—
1991–92	Halifax Citadels	AHL	8	3	3	1	447	30	0	4.03	.894	—	—	—	—	—	—	—	—
1991–92	Quebec Nordiques	NHL	30	6	17	3	1583	106	1	4.02	.864	—	—	—	—	—	—	—	—
1991–92	Edmonton Oilers	NHL	3	1	1	0	124	10	0	4.84	.863	2	0	0	60	3	0	3.00	.919
1992–93	Edmonton Oilers	NHL	26	9	12	2	1338	93	0	4.17	.879	—	—	—	—	—	—	—	—
1993–94	Mighty Ducks of Anaheim	NHL	28	10	15	1	1520	76	1	3.00	.908	—	—	—	—	—	—	—	—
1993–94	Montreal Canadiens	NHL	8	2	3	1	378	24	0	3.81	.860	1	0	1	59	5	0	5.08	.833
1994–95	Montreal Canadiens	NHL	7	1	3	1	346	18	0	3.12	.895	—	—	—	—	—	—	—	—
1995–96	Portland Pirates	AHL	58	21	23	6	3068	171	2	3.34	.898	13	7	6	782	36	1	2.76	—
1996–97	Ottawa Senators	NHL	37	17	15	1	1991	93	3	2.80	.895	7	3	4	425	14	1	1.97	.923
1997–98	Ottawa Senators	NHL	42	15	14	8	2236	84	3	2.25	.905	2	0	1	74	6	0	4.86	.806
1998–99	Ottawa Senators	NHL	43	22	10	8	2508	75	3	1.79	.925	2	0	2	118	6	0	3.05	.872
1999–2000	Ottawa Senators	NHL	44	18	12	8	2435	103	4	2.54	.899	-	-	-	-	-	-	-	-
1999–2000	Pittsburgh Penguins	NHL	7	4	2	0	374	15	0	2.40	.924	11	6	5	746	22	2	1.76	.945
2000–01	Columbus Blue Jackets	NHL	53	22	25	5	3129	127	4	2.44	.917	—	—	—	—	—	—	—	—
2001–02	Columbus Blue Jackets	NHL	44	12	27	3	2502	119	2	2.85	.900	—	—	—	—	—	—	—	—
2002–03	Dallas Stars	NHL	31	15	10	5	1701	70	4	2.47	.896	—	—	—	—	—	—	—	—
2003–04	Dallas Stars	NHL	11	3	7	0	548	22	1	2.41	.900	—	—	—	—	—	—	—	—
2003–04	Utah Grizzlies	AHL	5	1	3	1	281	14	0	2.99	.894	—	—	—	—	—	—	—	—
NHL totals			537	186	239	62	29,486	1497	26	3.05	.895	25	9	13	1482	56	3	2.26	.923

=== International ===
Year	Team	Event	GP	W	L	T	MIN	GA	SO	GAA	SV%
1993	Canada	WC	4				125	6		2.87
1999	Canada	WC	7	4	3	0	328	11	0	2.01	.915
Senior totals			11	—	—	—	453	17	—	2.25	—

== Trade history ==
- Traded (with forward Brad Zavisha) to the Edmonton Oilers, for LW Martin Ručinský, March 10, 1992.
- Selected by the Mighty Ducks of Anaheim in the 1993 NHL Expansion Draft, June 24, 1993.
- Traded to the Montreal Canadiens for forward Stéphan Lebeau, February 20, 1994.
- Signed as a free agent by the Washington Capitals, September 25, 1995.
- Signed as a free agent by the Ottawa Senators, August 14, 1996.
- Traded to the Pittsburgh Penguins, along with Janne Laukkanen, for goaltender Tom Barrasso, March 14, 2000.
- Signed as a free agent by the Columbus Blue Jackets, July 4, 2000.
- Traded (with Columbus' 2nd round choice (János Vas) in 2002 Entry Draft) to Dallas for New Jersey's 1st round choice (previously acquired, later traded to Buffalo - Buffalo selected Dan Paille) in 2002 Entry Draft, June 18, 2002.

Preceded by Scott Mosey and Marty Abrams	Winner of the Dave Pinkney Trophy; 1986	Succeeded by Jeff Hackett and Sean Evoy
Preceded by Gerry Iuliano	Winner of the F. W. "Dinty" Moore Trophy; 1985	Succeeded by Paul Henriques
