= Ken Quinney =

Canadian ice hockey player

- Born: May 23, 1965 (age 60); New Westminster, British Columbia, Canada
- Height: 5 ft 10 in (178 cm)
- Weight: 190 lb (86 kg; 13 st 8 lb)
- Position: Left wing
- Shot: Right
- Played for: Calgary Wranglers (WHL); Fredericton Express; Quebec Nordiques; Halifax Citadels; Adirondack Red Wings; Las Vegas Thunder; Frankfurt Lions
- NHL draft: 203rd overall, 1984; Quebec Nordiques
- Playing career: 1985–2001

Ken Quinney (born May 23, 1965) is a Canadian former professional ice hockey player. He played parts of three seasons for the Quebec Nordiques from 1986 to 1991, scoring 7 goals and 13 assists in 59 games. Most of his career, which lasted from 1985 to 2001 was spent in the American Hockey League, International Hockey League, and the Deutsche Eishockey Liga.

Quinney was a WHL all-star with the Calgary Wranglers, notching 311 points in 261 games. His minor league career saw him produce nearly a point per game. He scored 435 points in 453 games during his 8-year stint in the AHL and notably won the Calder Cup with the Adirondack Red Wings in 1992. He was also a star forward for the Las Vegas Thunder in the International Hockey League where he scored a franchise-record 189 goals over five seasons. After playing three years in Germany, he retired from the sport and returned to Las Vegas, where he became a firefighter and raised his sons who became hockey players themselves.

== Personal life ==
His son, Gage Quinney, played 3 games with the Vegas Golden Knights during the 2019-2020 season, making him the first Nevadan native to play in the NHL.

== Career statistics ==
=== Regular season and playoffs ===
			Regular season					Playoffs
Season	Team	League	GP	G	A	Pts	PIM	GP	G	A	Pts	PIM
1981–82	Calgary Wranglers	WHL	63	11	17	28	55	2	0	0	0	15
1982–83	Calgary Wranglers	WHL	71	26	25	51	71	16	6	1	7	46
1983–84	Calgary Wranglers	WHL	71	64	54	118	38	4	5	2	7	0
1984–85	Calgary Wranglers	WHL	56	47	67	114	65	7	6	4	10	15
1985–86	Fredericton Express	AHL	61	11	26	37	34	6	2	2	4	9
1986–87	Quebec Nordiques	NHL	25	2	7	9	16	—	—	—	—	—
1986–87	Fredericton Express	AHL	48	14	27	41	20	—	—	—	—	—
1987–88	Quebec Nordiques	NHL	15	2	2	4	5	—	—	—	—	—
1987–88	Fredericton Express	AHL	58	37	39	76	39	13	3	5	8	35
1988–89	Halifax Citadels	AHL	72	41	49	90	65	4	3	0	3	0
1989–90	Halifax Citadels	AHL	44	9	16	25	63	2	0	0	0	2
1990–91	Quebec Nordiques	NHL	19	3	4	7	2	—	—	—	—	—
1990–91	Halifax Citadels	AHL	44	20	20	40	76	—	—	—	—	—
1991–92	Adirondack Red Wings	AHL	63	31	29	60	33	19	7	12	19	9
1992–93	Adirondack Red Wings	AHL	63	32	34	66	15	10	2	9	11	9
1993–94	Las Vegas Thunder	IHL	79	55	53	108	52	5	3	3	6	2
1994–95	Las Vegas Thunder	IHL	78	40	42	82	40	10	3	2	5	9
1995–96	Las Vegas Thunder	IHL	66	33	36	69	59	9	2	5	7	15
1996–97	Las Vegas Thunder	IHL	71	27	36	63	39	2	0	0	0	0
1997–98	Las Vegas Thunder	IHL	82	34	57	91	19	4	1	2	3	2
1998–99	Frankfurt Lions	DEL	36	12	17	29	26	8	2	3	5	27
1999–00	Frankfurt Lions	DEL	56	17	16	33	51	5	0	2	2	4
2000–01	Frankfurt Lions	DEL	60	21	24	45	12	—	—	—	—	—
AHL totals			453	195	240	435	345	54	17	28	45	64
NHL totals			59	7	13	20	23	—	—	—	—	—

== Awards ==
- WHL East First All-Star Team – 1985
- AHL Calder Cup Champion – 1992
- IHL First All-Star Team – 1993-1994
- IHL Second All-Star Team – 1997-1998
