= Tony Twist =

Canadian ice hockey player

- Born: May 9, 1968 (age 58) Sherwood Park, Alberta, Canada
- Height: 6 ft 1 in (185 cm)
- Weight: 265 lb (120 kg; 18 st 13 lb)
- Position: Left wing
- Shot: Left
- Played for: Quebec Nordiques; St. Louis Blues
- NHL draft: 177th overall, 1988; St. Louis Blues
- Playing career: 1989–1999

Anthony Rory Twist (born May 9, 1968) is a Canadian former professional ice hockey player. He played left wing in the NHL for the St. Louis Blues and Quebec Nordiques between 1989 and 1999, and was a feared enforcer. Twist penned a foreword to the Ross Bernstein book The Code: The Unwritten Rules Of Fighting And Retaliation In The NHL. He also owned a chain of bars named Twister's Iron Bar Saloon, with locations in St. Charles and Imperial Missouri. Twist was co-host of the Smash and Twist show on 590 the Fan in St. Louis. Currently he owns and operates Missouri Windshield Repair and Replacement

== Playing career ==
Twist was selected by the St. Louis Blues in the ninth round of the 1988 NHL entry draft, No. 177 overall. After skating with the Blues for the 1989–1990 season, he played four seasons with the Quebec Nordiques (later relocated to Colorado). Twist became a free agent in 1994 and returned to the Blues, playing there until July 1999, when he broke his pelvis in a motorcycle accident in St. Louis and was unable to resume his NHL career. Known for his devastating punches, he battered many of the league's top enforcers during his career.

== Lawsuit against Todd McFarlane ==
In the Spawn comic book series, Todd McFarlane created a mob enforcer character named Antonio "Tony Twist" Twistelli, whom McFarlane acknowledged was named after Tony Twist. Twist learned about the character through his mother in British Columbia, who had a group of boys arrive to her house with Tony Twist-related Spawn items in 1997. After this incident, Twist viewed the Spawn animated series that had earlier aired on HBO from May to June 1997, he subsequently remarked "I'm in pink thong underwear, smoking a cigar, ordering the kidnapping of a child while two women are naked on the couch making love to each other. I obviously didn't want any part of that. Even if I was a good guy I wouldn’t have participated. You’ve got kids being kidnapped, you’ve got nudity, you’ve got police raping women. It’s nothing I want to be affiliated with." On October 31, 1997, Twist filed an anonymous John Doe lawsuit against Todd McFarlane Productions, and related parties such as HBO, for appropriation of his name without permission. The lawsuit was filed anonymously in order to keep publicity surrounding it to a minimum.

He was initially awarded $24.5 million by a St. Louis, Missouri judge in 2000. Sean Phillips, a former executive of a sports nutrition company, testified for Twist, stating that he withdrew a $100,000 endorsement deal, only after learning about the despicable nature of the Tony Twist character. However, the $24.5 million ruling would be reversed in November 2000, with McFarlane joking to journalists "He's got to return that yacht now." The trial continued, and Twist later won $15 million in 2004 when a St. Louis jury found Todd McFarlane Productions had profited from Twist's likeness. The verdict was upheld after two appeals in June 2006. In 2007, Twist and McFarlane settled the lawsuit out of court for $5 million.

Twist reflected on the lawsuit in a 2020 interview, saying "I did not despise Todd in any way shape or form. Not at all. He thought this was a first amendment issue where he had the right to do whatever."

== Career statistics ==
=== Regular season and playoffs ===
| | | | Regular season | | | | | Playoffs |
| Season | Team | League | GP | G | A | Pts | PIM | GP | G | A | Pts | PIM |
|---|---|---|---|---|---|---|---|---|---|---|---|---|
| 1983–84 | Prince George Spruce Kings | PCJHL | 54 | 30 | 35 | 65 | 110 | — | — | — | — | — |
| 1984–85 | Prince George Spruce Kings | PCJHL | — | — | — | — | — | — | — | — | — | — |
| 1985–86 | Prince George Spruce Kings | PCJHL | 42 | 32 | 20 | 52 | 162 | — | — | — | — | — |
| 1986–87 | Saskatoon Blades | WHL | 64 | 0 | 8 | 8 | 181 | — | — | — | — | — |
| 1987–88 | Saskatoon Blades | WHL | 55 | 1 | 8 | 9 | 226 | 10 | 1 | 1 | 2 | 6 |
| 1988–89 | Peoria Rivermen | IHL | 67 | 3 | 8 | 11 | 312 | — | — | — | — | — |
| 1989–90 | St. Louis Blues | NHL | 28 | 0 | 0 | 0 | 124 | — | — | — | — | — |
| 1989–90 | Peoria Rivermen | IHL | 36 | 1 | 5 | 6 | 200 | 5 | 0 | 2 | 2 | 8 |
| 1990–91 | Quebec Nordiques | NHL | 24 | 0 | 0 | 0 | 104 | — | — | — | — | — |
| 1990–91 | Peoria Rivermen | IHL | 38 | 2 | 10 | 12 | 244 | — | — | — | — | — |
| 1991–92 | Quebec Nordiques | NHL | 44 | 0 | 1 | 1 | 164 | — | — | — | — | — |
| 1992–93 | Quebec Nordiques | NHL | 34 | 0 | 2 | 2 | 64 | — | — | — | — | — |
| 1993–94 | Quebec Nordiques | NHL | 49 | 0 | 4 | 4 | 101 | — | — | — | — | — |
| 1994–95 | St. Louis Blues | NHL | 28 | 3 | 0 | 3 | 89 | 1 | 0 | 0 | 0 | 6 |
| 1995–96 | St. Louis Blues | NHL | 51 | 3 | 2 | 5 | 100 | 10 | 1 | 1 | 2 | 16 |
| 1996–97 | St. Louis Blues | NHL | 64 | 1 | 2 | 3 | 121 | 6 | 0 | 0 | 0 | 0 |
| 1997–98 | St. Louis Blues | NHL | 60 | 1 | 1 | 2 | 105 | — | — | — | — | — |
| 1998–99 | St. Louis Blues | NHL | 63 | 2 | 6 | 8 | 149 | 1 | 0 | 0 | 0 | 0 |
| NHL totals | | | 445 | 10 | 18 | 28 | 1121 | 18 | 1 | 1 | 2 | 22 |
| IHL totals | | | 334 | 6 | 23 | 29 | 756 | 5 | 0 | 1 | 1 | 38 |
