= Steven Finn (ice hockey) =

Canadian ice hockey player

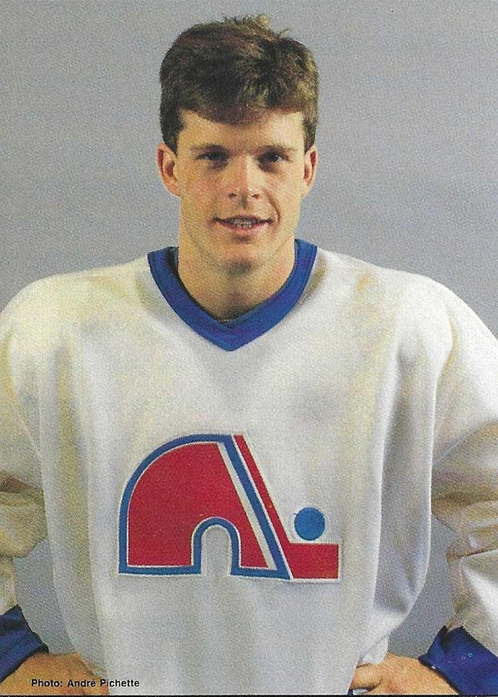
- Born: August 20, 1966 (age 59) Laval, Quebec, Canada
- Height: 6 ft 1 in (185 cm)
- Weight: 198 lb (90 kg; 14 st 2 lb)
- Position: Defence
- Shot: Left
- Played for: Quebec Nordiques; Tampa Bay Lightning; Los Angeles Kings
- NHL draft: 57th overall, 1984; Quebec Nordiques
- Playing career: 1984–1998

Steven Finn (born August 20, 1966) is a Canadian former professional ice hockey player who played 13 seasons in the National Hockey League from 1985–86 until 1996–97. He is currently a junior hockey analyst for TVA Sports. As of 2024, Finn currently ranks second in penalty minutes in Nordiques/Avalanche history only behind Dale Hunter and ahead of Cody McLeod.

== Playing career ==
A defenceman, Finn was drafted 57th overall by the Quebec Nordiques in the 1984 NHL entry draft. He played 725 career NHL games, scoring 34 goals and 78 assists for 112 points. During the 1990–91 season he served as Quebec Nordiques team co-captain with Joe Sakic.

Finn played most of his career with the Nordiques, but towards the end of his career split parts of three seasons with the Tampa Bay Lightning and Los Angeles Kings.

== Career statistics ==
			Regular season					Playoffs
Season	Team	League	GP	G	A	Pts	PIM	GP	G	A	Pts	PIM
1982–83	Laval Voisins	QMJHL	69	7	30	37	108	6	0	2	2	6
1983–84	Laval Voisins	QMJHL	68	7	39	46	164	14	1	6	7	27
1984–85	Laval Voisins	QMJHL	61	20	33	53	169	—	—	—	—	—
1984–85	Fredericton Express	AHL	4	0	0	0	14	6	1	1	2	4
1985–86	Quebec Nordiques	NHL	17	0	1	1	28	—	—	—	—	—
1985–86	Laval Titan	QMJHL	29	4	15	19	111	14	6	16	22	57
1986–87	Quebec Nordiques	NHL	36	2	5	7	40	13	0	2	2	29
1986–87	Fredericton Express	AHL	38	7	19	26	73	—	—	—	—	—
1987–88	Quebec Nordiques	NHL	75	3	7	10	198	—	—	—	—	—
1988–89	Quebec Nordiques	NHL	77	2	6	8	235	—	—	—	—	—
1989–90	Quebec Nordiques	NHL	64	3	9	12	208	—	—	—	—	—
1990–91	Quebec Nordiques	NHL	71	6	13	19	228	—	—	—	—	—
1991–92	Quebec Nordiques	NHL	65	4	7	11	194	—	—	—	—	—
1992–93	Quebec Nordiques	NHL	80	5	9	14	160	6	0	1	1	8
1993–94	Quebec Nordiques	NHL	80	4	13	17	159	—	—	—	—	—
1994–95	Quebec Nordiques	NHL	40	0	3	3	64	4	0	1	1	2
1995–96	Tampa Bay Lightning	NHL	16	0	0	0	24	—	—	—	—	—
1995–96	Los Angeles Kings	NHL	50	3	2	5	102	—	—	—	—	—
1996–97	Los Angeles Kings	NHL	54	2	3	5	84	—	—	—	—	—
1997–98	Long Beach Ice Dogs	IHL	75	6	14	20	134	17	1	4	5	148
NHL totals			725	34	78	112	1724	23	0	4	4	39

Preceded by Peter Stastny	Quebec Nordiques captain 1990–91 with Joe Sakic	Succeeded by Mike Hough
