= Halifax Citadels =

Former American Hockey League team based in Halifax, Nova Scotia, Canada

- City: Halifax, Nova Scotia
- League: American Hockey League
- Operated: 1988–1993
- Home arena: Halifax Metro Centre
- Colours: Blue, white, red
- Affiliates: Quebec Nordiques

Franchise history
- 1981–1988: Fredericton Express
- 1988–1993: Halifax Citadels
- 1993–1996: Cornwall Aces
- 1999–present: Wilkes-Barre/Scranton Penguins

The Halifax Citadels were a professional ice hockey team based in Halifax, Nova Scotia. They played in the American Hockey League between 1988 and 1993. They were created by the relocation of the Fredericton Express and filled a void left by the relocation of the Nova Scotia Oilers to Cape Breton.

The Citadels, named after the Halifax Citadel military fort, were affiliated with the Quebec Nordiques National Hockey League team. Home games were played at the Halifax Metro Centre, located at the base of Citadel Hill.

The franchise was moved to Cornwall, Ontario in 1993, where they were known as the Cornwall Aces. One year later, the Halifax Mooseheads of the QMJHL filled the void in the market.

On August 26, 2021, the Halifax Mooseheads announced on their 2021–22 schedule that on November 27, 2021, they would be wearing Halifax Citadels throwback jerseys in their game against the Blainville-Boisbriand Armada for "90's Night".

== Season-by-season results ==
=== Regular season ===
Season	Games	Won	Lost	Tied	Points	Goals for	Goals against	Standing
1988–89	80	42	30	8	92	345	300	2nd, North
1989–90	80	37	37	6	80	317	300	4th, North
1990–91	80	33	35	12	78	338	340	6th, North
1991–92	80	25	38	17	67	280	324	5th, Atlantic
1992–93	80	33	37	10	76	312	348	5th, Atlantic

=== Playoffs ===
Season	1st round	2nd round	3rd round	Finals
1988–89	L, 0-4, Moncton	—	—	—
1989–90	L, 2-4 Sherbrooke	—	—	—
1990–91	Out of playoffs			
1991–92	Out of playoffs			
1992–93	Out of playoffs			

Career leaders

Goals: 121 (Mark Vermette, 1988–93)

Assists: 110 (Mark Vermette, 1988–93)

Points: 231 (Mark Vermette, 1988–93)

PIM: 920 (Greg Smyth, 1988–92)

== See also ==
- List of ice hockey teams in Nova Scotia
- Sports teams in Halifax, Nova Scotia
