= Mats Sundin =

Swedish ice hockey player (born 1971)

- Hockey Hall of Fame, 2012
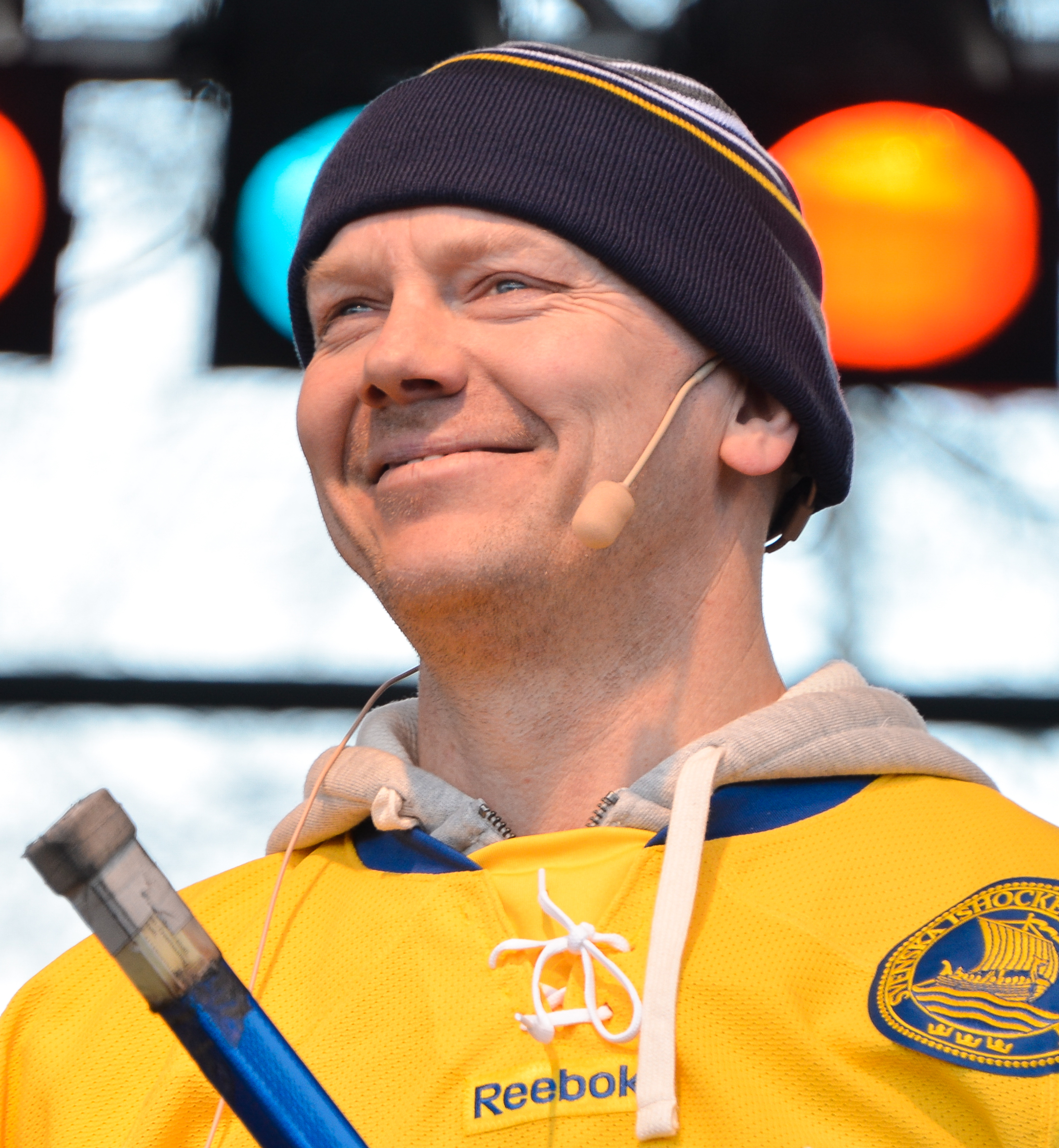
- Sundin in 2015
- Born: 13 February 1971 (age 55) Bromma, Sweden
- Height: 6 ft 5 in (196 cm)
- Weight: 240 lb (109 kg; 17 st 2 lb)
- Position: Centre
- Shot: Right
- Played for: Djurgårdens IF; Quebec Nordiques; Toronto Maple Leafs; Vancouver Canucks
- National team: Sweden
- NHL draft: 1st overall, 1989; Quebec Nordiques
- Playing career: 1989–2009
Medal record
Representing Sweden
Men's ice hockey
Olympic Games
Gold medal – first place	2006 Turin
World Championships
Gold medal – first place	1991 Finland
Gold medal – first place	1992 Czechoslovakia
Gold medal – first place	1998 Switzerland
Silver medal – second place	1990 Switzerland
Silver medal – second place	2003 Finland
Bronze medal – third place	1994 Italy
Bronze medal – third place	2001 Germany

Mats Johan Sundin (Swedish: [ˈmatːs sɵnˈdiːn]; born 13 February 1971) is a Swedish ice hockey executive and former professional player who is currently the Senior Executive Advisor of Hockey Operations for the Toronto Maple Leafs of the National Hockey League (NHL). Sundin played as a centre for 18 seasons in the NHL for the Quebec Nordiques, Toronto Maple Leafs, and Vancouver Canucks from 1990 to 2009.

Originally drafted first overall in 1989, Sundin played his first four seasons in the NHL with the Quebec Nordiques, which saw him break out in scoring during the 1992–93 season with thirty straight games with a point; no player has recorded a 30-game points streak since Sundin. He was then traded to the Toronto Maple Leafs in 1994, where he played the majority of his career, serving as team captain for 11 seasons. At the end of the 2007–08 season, Sundin was the longest-serving non-North American-born captain in NHL history. Sundin last played for the Vancouver Canucks in the 2008–09 season before announcing his retirement on 30 September 2009. He appeared in the Stanley Cup playoffs in 10 of his 18 seasons.

Known for his great size, strength, and skill, Sundin remained consistent throughout his career in scoring. He recorded at least 70 points in every full season of his career—excluding his rookie year, the shortened 1994–95 lockout season, and his half-season with Vancouver. He also played at least 70 games in every full season and led the Maple Leafs in scoring for all but one season during his tenure with the team. On 14 October 2006, Sundin became the first Swedish player to score 500 goals. He is the Maple Leafs' franchise all-time leader in points (987). Over his career, Sundin averaged just over a point per game with 1,349 points in 1,346 NHL games. He recorded seventeen consecutive 20-goal seasons, with only his final season seeing him record less than twenty goals.

Internationally, Sundin won three gold medals with Sweden at the World Championships and was the team captain for Sweden's gold medal at the 2006 Winter Olympics in Turin.

Sundin was elected to the Hockey Hall of Fame on 26 June 2012, in his first year of eligibility. He became the second Swede, following Börje Salming (another long-time Maple Leafs player), to be chosen to the Hall of Fame. Sundin was also inducted into the IIHF Hall of Fame in 2013. In 2017 Sundin was named one of the '100 Greatest NHL Players' in history. He returned to the Maple Leafs as Senior Executive Advisor, Hockey Operations in May 2026, his first executive position.

== Playing career ==
=== Quebec Nordiques ===
Sundin was drafted by the Quebec Nordiques with the first overall pick in the 1989 NHL entry draft, becoming the first European-born player drafted first overall in NHL history. At the time, Sundin was playing in the Swedish second-tier Allsvenskan for Nacka HK. He played the following season in Sweden's Elitserien for Djurgårdens IF, helping the club to the Le Mat Trophy as league champions.

Sundin made his NHL debut with Quebec during the 1990–91 season, finishing second on the team behind Joe Sakic with 59 points. He scored his first career NHL goal against the Hartford Whalers in his first NHL game on 4 October 1990. After improving to 76 points in his second NHL season, he led the Nordiques with a career-high 114 points in the 1992–93 season, emerging as one of the league's premier young players.

In the final game of the 1991–92 season, Sundin had recorded two points. The 1992–93 season saw him go on a scoring tear that saw him emerge as one of the league's premier young players, which saw him record a point in each of the first thirty games of the season before the streak ended after the December 10 game; in 31 total games with a point, he had 21 goals and 27 assists for 48 points. For streaks spread out over multiple seasons, his 31-game streak ranks as the sixth best in league history while his 30-game streak for a single season is tied for fourth best. As of 2026, Sundin is the last player to have recorded a 30-game point streak. He played one more season with the Nordiques, recording 85 points in 84 games, before being dealt to the Toronto Maple Leafs at the 1994 Draft.

=== Toronto Maple Leafs ===
The Maple Leafs acquired Sundin in a trade on 28 June 1994. The Nordiques sent Sundin, Garth Butcher, Todd Warriner and a 1994 first-round draft pick (acquired through the 1992 Eric Lindros deal, traded to the Washington Capitals, used to pick Nolan Baumgartner) to Toronto in exchange for Wendel Clark, Sylvain Lefebvre, Landon Wilson and a 1994 first-round draft pick (used to pick Jeff Kealty). However, as a result of the 1994–95 lockout, Sundin's Toronto debut was delayed and he returned to Sweden to play again for Djurgårdens IF. When NHL play resumed later that season, Sundin made an immediate impact, leading the Leafs in scoring at a point-per-game pace with 47 points.

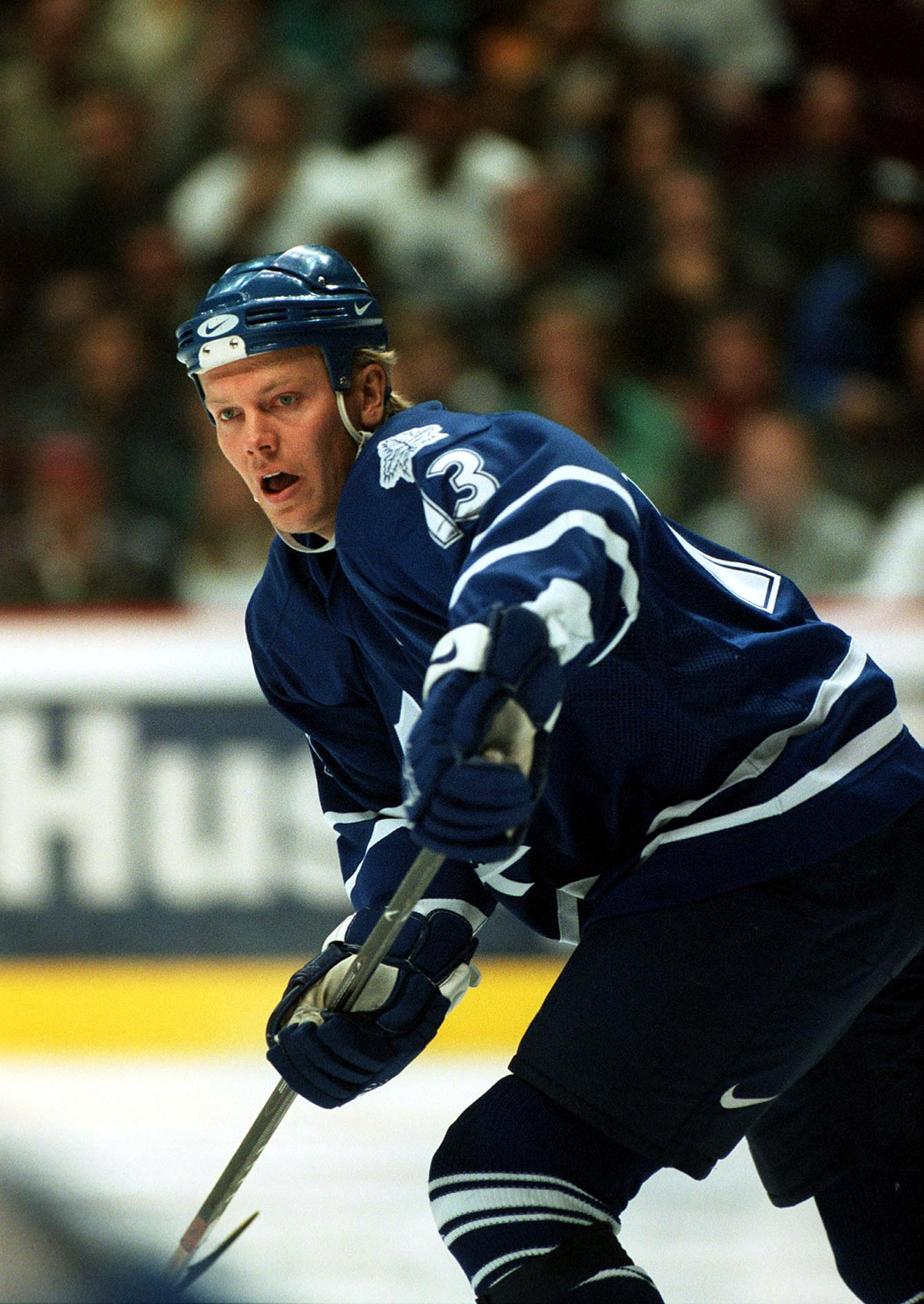
Sundin with the Toronto Maple Leafs during the 1997–98 season.

In his third season with the Maple Leafs, Sundin recorded a 41-goal, 94-point season, the second-highest of his career and the most prolific during his tenure in Toronto. With the departure of team captain Doug Gilmour to the New Jersey Devils during the 1996–97 season, Sundin was named Gilmour's successor, becoming the 16th Maple Leafs captain and first European captain in team history.

After an 83-point campaign in 1998–99, Sundin led the Maple Leafs into the 1999 Stanley Cup playoffs as the fourth seed in Eastern Conference. Bolstered by the acquisitions of forward Steve Thomas and goaltender Curtis Joseph in the previous off-season, the Leafs made it to the Conference Finals against the seventh-seeded Buffalo Sabres, but were defeated in five games. Sundin finished with a career-playoff-high 16 points in 17 playoff contests. In 2002, Sundin signed a six-year contract extension with Toronto for $52.5 million. Sundin made another appearance in the Eastern Conference Finals with the Maple Leafs again in 2001–02, but lost to the Carolina Hurricanes in six games.

In 2002–03, after eight consecutive years as the Maple Leafs' leading scorer in the regular season, Sundin was succeeded by Alexander Mogilny, who topped Sundin's 72 points with 79. The following season, Mogilny suffered a serious hip injury that required him to miss 12 weeks, allowing Sundin to reclaim his spot as top scorer for the Maple Leafs that season.

During the 2003–04 campaign, however, Sundin was the subject of League controversy with his infamous stick-throwing incident on 8 January 2004, against the Nashville Predators. Breaking his stick on an attempted shot, Sundin threw it aside in disgust. Instead of hitting the glass, the stick inadvertently entered the crowd. Deemed a reckless act by the NHL, Sundin was subsequently assigned a one-game suspension. After the game, as an apology, he gave a brand new autographed stick to the fan that had caught the broken stick.

As a result of the ensuing 2004–05 NHL lockout, Sundin spent the next season inactive, opting not to play in Sweden like many of his countrymen. When NHL play resumed for 2005–06, Sundin was sidelined in the first game of the season when he was struck in the face with a puck, narrowly missing his eye, but breaking his orbital bone. He returned to the lineup after a month to lead the team in scoring with 78 points. However, Toronto did not meet the same success and missed the playoffs for the first time in seven years in 2006. It would also mark the first of Sundin's last three years with the Leafs without a post-season appearance.

Near the beginning of the 2006–07 season, Sundin became just the 35th player in NHL history to reach the 500-goal mark. He achieved the milestone on 14 October 2006, with a hat-trick effort against Miikka Kiprusoff of the Calgary Flames. He scored the 500th goal with his third mark of the game, shorthanded, over Kiprusoff's blocker in overtime to defeat the Flames 5–4. Later in the season, on 20 March 2007, Sundin reached 900 points as a Maple Leaf with a two-assist effort in a 2–1 win against the New Jersey Devils.

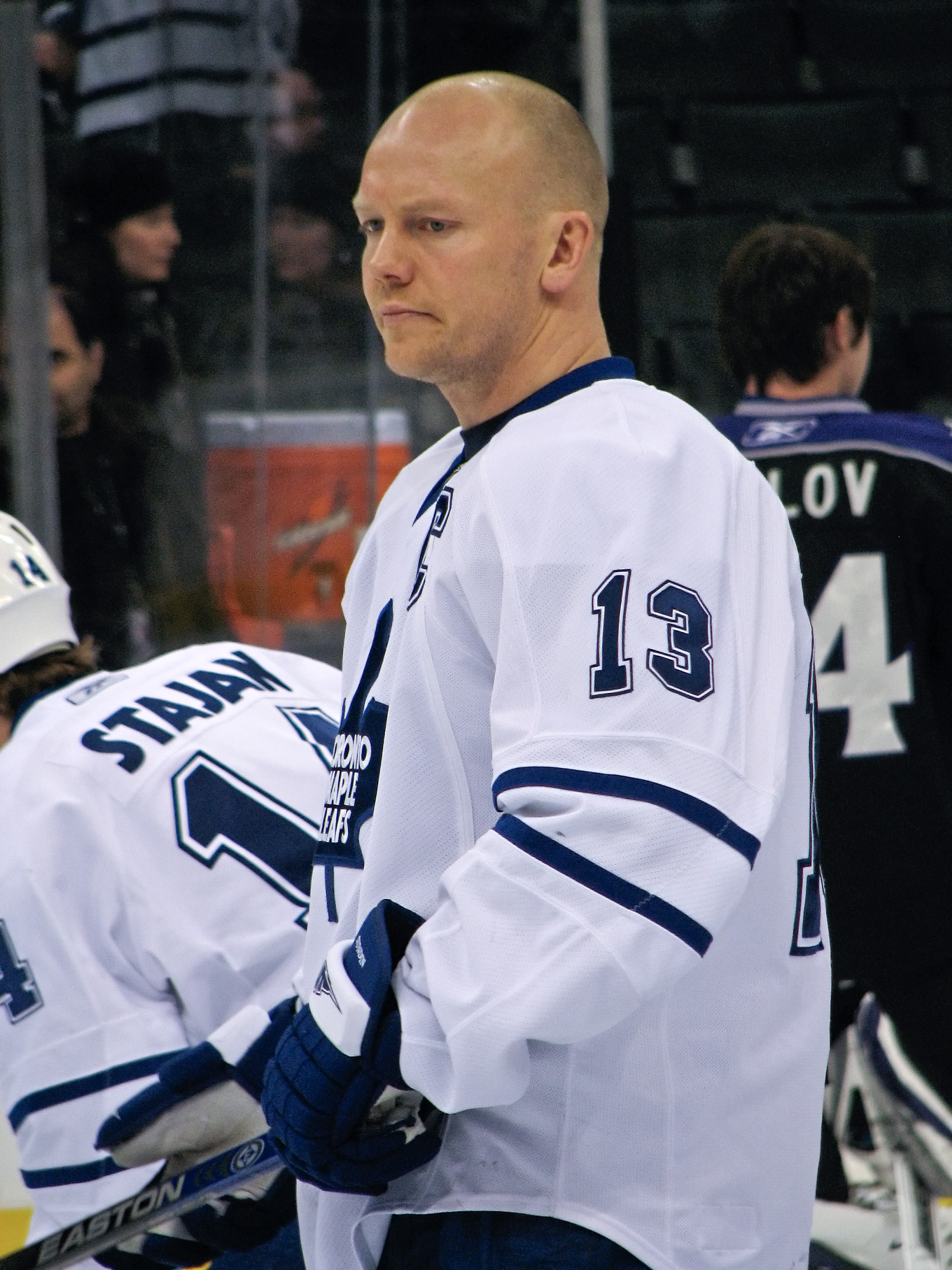
Sundin with the Maple Leafs during the 2007–08 season, his last with the team.

The following season, in 2007–08, Sundin began approaching several team records as a Maple Leaf. In the second game of the season, on 4 October 2007, against the Ottawa Senators, Sundin scored his 389th goal with the club, tying Darryl Sittler's team record. In Toronto's fifth game of the season, on 11 October, versus the New York Islanders, Sundin scored his 917th point as a Maple Leaf, breaking Sittler's franchise record. In the same game, he also scored his 390th goal in the third period, taking sole possession of the all-time goal-scoring lead. At the end of the game, he was ceremoniously elected the first, second, and third star of the game. On 27 November, in a game against the Montreal Canadiens, Sundin became the first player to score 400 goals as a Leaf. Several days later, on 1 December, in a game against the Pittsburgh Penguins, he broke Babe Dye's 83-year-old Toronto record when he extended his home game point streak to 15 games.

With the Leafs falling out of playoff contention once more towards the end of the season and Sundin's contract set to expire, Sundin was the focus of numerous trade rumors as the NHL trade deadline approached. Maple Leafs management requested that Sundin waive his no-trade clause in order for the team to acquire potential young talent and/or draft picks to secure the team's future. However, one day before the trade deadline, he stated that he would not waive his no-trade clause, claiming that he did not believe in being a "rental player" and that if he won the Stanley Cup, he wanted to do it over the course of an entire season. He remained with the club and, with 78 points, marked the fourth consecutive year and 12 of 13 years as the Maple Leafs' leading scorer.

=== Vancouver Canucks ===
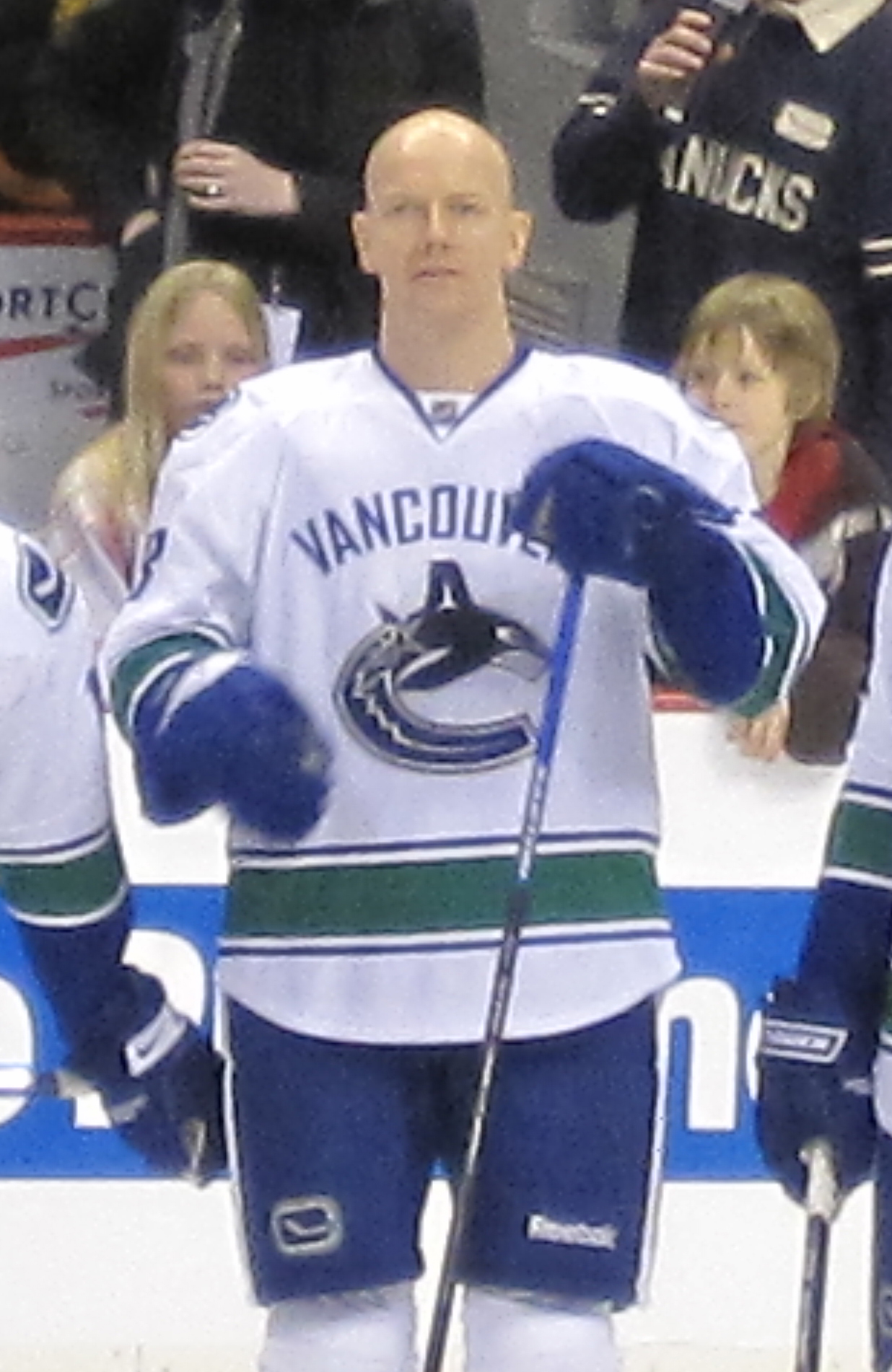
Sundin with the Vancouver Canucks in February 2009, a month after making his debut with the team.

Sundin became a free agent on 1 July 2008, although the Maple Leafs had previously given the Montreal Canadiens special rights to negotiate with him until then. On the day of free agency, newly appointed Vancouver Canucks General Manager Mike Gillis offered Sundin a lucrative two-year, $20 million contract which, if signed, would have made him the highest paid player in the NHL. Attempting to entice him to sign with the Canucks, numerous Vancouver businesses extended Swedish-centred special offers, such as a Volvo and IKEA products. The New York Rangers, Canadiens and Leafs also made contract offers; however, Sundin chose to hold out for the beginning of the season, contemplating retirement. After announcing that he would, in fact, return to the NHL and sign with a team, he narrowed his prospects down to the Rangers and Canucks. On 18 December 2008 the Canucks announced that Sundin had signed with the club to a one-year, $8.6 million contract. Pro-rated for the remainder of the season, Sundin's salary worked out to $5 million. Taking a $1.4 million pay cut from the Canucks' original yearly offer, Sundin reportedly decreased his contract willingly to give the Canucks added salary cap space to potentially bolster their lineup before the end of the season.

Sundin made his Canucks debut on 7 January 2009, in a 4–2 victory over the Edmonton Oilers, and scored his first goal with the club two games later, on 10 January, a powerplay goal in a 4–2 loss to the San Jose Sharks. Sundin returned to Toronto on 21 February 2009 to play his first game against the Maple Leafs. The return to the Air Canada Centre became highly emotional when a video tribute was paid to the Leafs' franchise leader during a break in the first period, followed by a standing ovation. The game was decided by a shootout with Sundin scoring the winning goal against his former team resulting in a 3–2 win for Vancouver. Having established himself as a point-per-game player throughout his career, Sundin was criticized for his regular-season play, managing just 28 points in 41 games while playing mostly on the second line with Pavol Demitra and Ryan Kesler, Sundin returned to point-per-game form in the 2009 playoffs, however, as the Canucks entered the post-season as the Northwest Division champions. He missed the final two games of the Canucks' first-round sweep against the St. Louis Blues with a suspected hip injury after falling awkwardly behind the net in Game 2, but returned in time for the second round against the Chicago Blackhawks. As the Canucks were eliminated in six games, Sundin finished the playoffs with eight points in eight games.

== Post-playing career ==
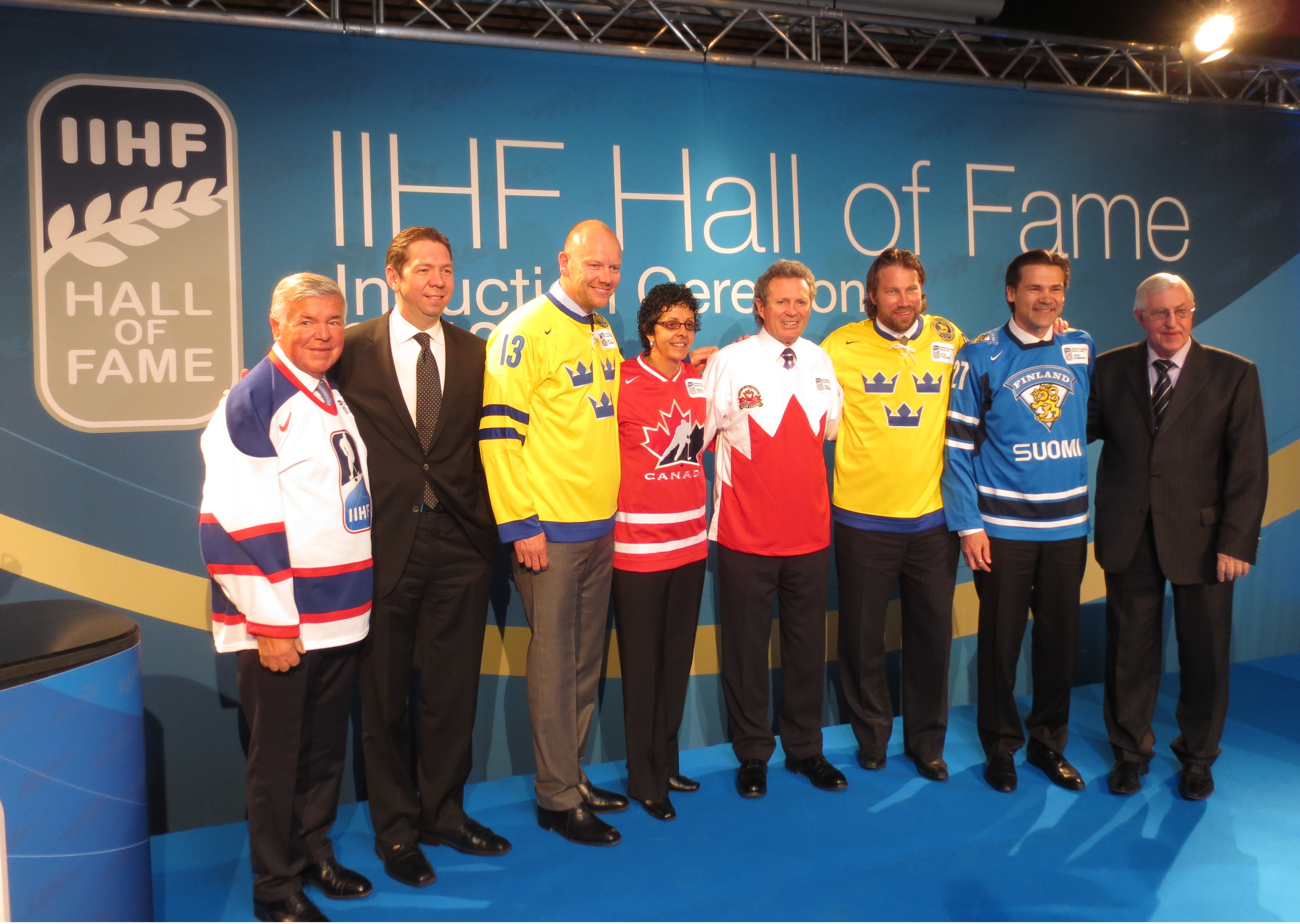
Sundin (third-left) at the IIHF Hall of Fame induction ceremony in 2013.

On 30 September 2009, Sundin announced his retirement at a press conference in Stockholm.

Sundin was honoured on 29 October 2011, more than two years after his retirement, at a Toronto Maple Leafs home game against the Pittsburgh Penguins. His number 13 jersey was honoured by the organization in a ceremony prior to a home game against the Montreal Canadiens on 11 February 2012.

On 12 November 2012, Sundin was inducted into the Hockey Hall of Fame alongside Joe Sakic, Adam Oates and Pavel Bure. In November 2013, Sundin was named as an inductee into the IIHF Hall of Fame, alongside Peter Forsberg, Danielle Goyette, Paul Henderson, Teppo Numminen.

On 10 September 2015, it was announced that Mats Sundin would be added to "Legends Row", a statue outside the Air Canada Centre consisting of 12 of the best players in the franchise's history.

On 15 October 2016, Sundin's number 13 jersey was officially retired by the Toronto Maple Leafs in a ceremony prior to their centenary season home opening game against Boston. A few months later, Sundin was named one of the 100 greatest players in league history by the NHL itself.

On May 3, 2026, Sundin was hired by the Maple Leafs as Senior Executive Advisor of Hockey Operations.

== International play ==
Sundin represented Sweden at various international competitions, including the World Cup and the Olympic Games, and held the position of team captain for the national squad for the nearly ten years. Sundin was widely recognized as one of the top players in the world in these international competitions, and added a highly impressive list of accomplishments to his credentials as a result of his outstanding performance in the 2002 Winter Olympics and 2004 World Cup. Sundin won three IIHF World Championships with Sweden in 1991, 1992 and 1998. Sundin finally clinched an Olympic gold medal with Sweden in 2006 in Turin.

A picture of his "fighting face" when Sweden turned a 5–1 deficit into a 6–5 win over Finland during a World Championship game has become iconic. Sundin was the captain of the Swedish national team in the 2006 Winter Olympics, leading them to a gold medal with a 3–2 victory over Finland in the final.

Sundin played for Sweden in:

- 1989 European Junior Championships
- 1990 European Junior Championships
- 1990 World Junior Championships (silver medal)
- 1991 Canada Cup
- 1991 World Championships (gold medal)
- 1992 World Championships (gold medal)
- 1994 World Championships (bronze medal)
- 1996 World Cup of Hockey
- 1998 World Championships (gold medal)
- 1998 Winter Olympics
- 2001 World Championships
- 2002 Winter Olympics
- 2003 World Championships (silver medal)
- 2004 World Cup of Hockey
- 2006 Winter Olympics (gold medal)

== Personal life ==
The city of Toronto is home to an intense hockey media, and since Sundin is a private individual, he was arguably the most scrutinized athlete in the city. He regularly deflected any probes into his personal life, and rarely spoke negatively of his teammates in public. In May 2006, Sundin put his four-bedroom house in Forest Hill up for sale for a price of $6.499 million, which led to a flurry of media speculation that he was unhappy with the Leafs and sought to move (and play) somewhere else. However, Sundin and his longtime girlfriend Tina Fagerström had parted ways, and Maple Leaf Sports & Entertainment CEO Richard Peddie simply commented that the real estate market was very hot, and that Sundin's house was "an awfully big house for a single guy." Sundin played with the Leafs the following NHL season. On 30 April 2008, Sundin was receiving a leadership award at Our Lady of Lourdes Catholic High School in Guelph, Ontario, when he announced that he and his girlfriend Josephine Johansson were engaged to be married. The two had been dating for about a year.

In September 2008, Sundin announced an endorsement deal with PokerStars. He plays under the username "MatsSundin" and will donate any earnings to charity.

On 29 August 2009, Sundin married fiancée Josephine Johansson. The guest list exceeded 200 people and included several current and former teammates. He and Josephine are the parents of daughter Bonnie, and two sons, Nathanael and Julian.

Sundin was also a Goodwill Ambassador for the Adopt-A-Minefield Campaign; an organization that raises awareness and funds to end the human and economic suffering caused by anti-personnel landmines.

Sundin was a partner in a Standardbred harness racing horse named Rotation, which in 2003 won the prestigious Maple Leaf Trot at Mohawk Racetrack.

== Records ==
=== NHL ===
- Tied-26th in career goals (564, shared with Joe Nieuwendyk)
- 41st in career assists (785)
- 32nd all-time in career points (1,349)
- First European-born and trained player to be drafted first overall in the NHL entry draft (1989 by the Quebec Nordiques)
- Only Swedish player to reach the 500-goal milestone
- Most career points and goals by a Swedish hockey player (1349, 564)
- First Swedish player to reach 1,000 points
- One of four players (Marcel Dionne, Jaromír Jágr, Alexander Ovechkin) to record at least 20 goals in each of his first 17 NHL seasons

=== Toronto Maple Leafs ===
- Assists by a forward (567)
- Points (987)
- Assists in a period (3, tied with Morgan Rielly, Darcy Tucker, Matt Stajan and Clarke MacArthur)

== Awards and achievements ==
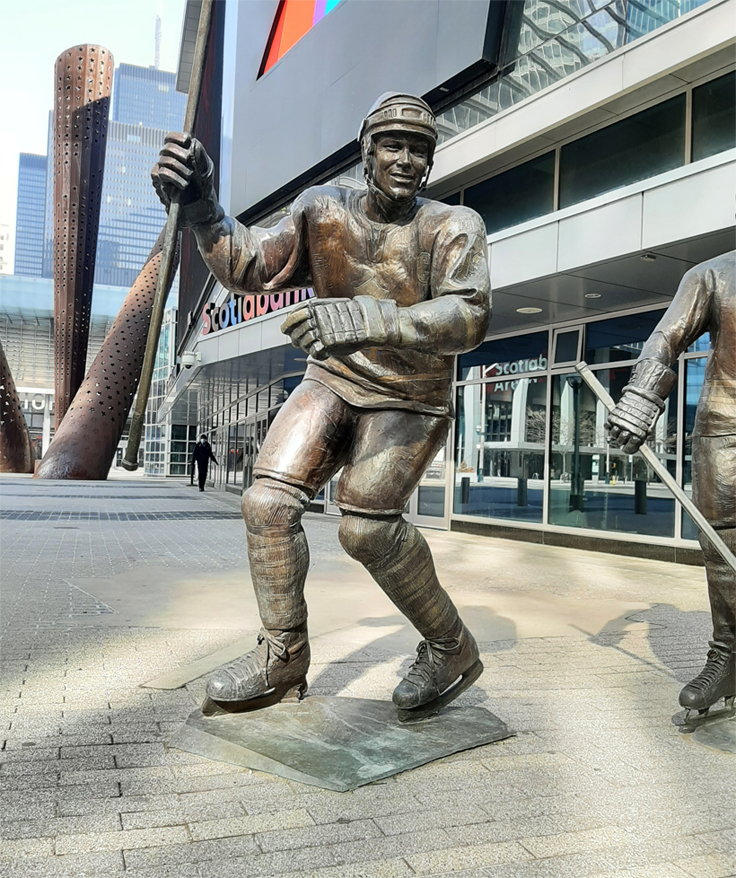
Sundin is immortalized with a statue at Legends Row in front of Scotiabank Arena.

- NHL 2K cover athlete in 2006
- TV-pucken Champion as part of Team Stockholm 1986.
- Swedish Champion in 1990.
- First European-born player to be drafted first overall in the NHL entry draft. (1989)
- Named to the Elitserien World All-Star Team in 1991, 1992, 1994, 1997, 1998 and 2002.
- Recipient of the Viking Award in 1993, 1994, 1997 and 2002.
- Named to the World Championships All-Star Team in 1992 and 2003.
- World Championships' Best Forward in 1992, 1998 and 2003.
- Named to the Canada Cup All-Star Team in 1991.
- Named to the World Cup of Hockey All-Star Team in 1996.
- Played in the NHL All-Star Game in 1996, 1997, 1998, 1999, 2000, 2001, 2002, 2003 (injured) and 2004.
- Named to the NHL Second All-Star Team in 2002 and 2004.
- Named to the Olympic Tournament All-Star Team in 2002.
- Achieved 500 goal plateau on 14 October 2006, with a short-handed, hat trick, overtime winner.
- Achieved 1,300 points on 7 February 2008 against the Montreal Canadiens.
- Awarded the "Mark Messier Leadership Award" in 2008.
- Enshrined in the Hockey Hall of Fame in the class of 2012, his first year of eligibility.
- Inducted into the IIHF Hall of Fame in 2013.
- Number (13) Retired by the Toronto Maple Leafs.
- Named one of the 100 Greatest Players in league history by the NHL.

== Career statistics ==
=== Regular season and playoffs ===
			Regular season					Playoffs
Season	Team	League	GP	G	A	Pts	PIM	GP	G	A	Pts	PIM
1988–89	Nacka HK	SWE-2	25	10	8	18	18	—	—	—	—	—
1989–90	Djurgårdens IF	SEL	34	10	8	18	16	8	7	7	4
1990–91	Quebec Nordiques	NHL	80	23	36	59	58	—	—	—	—	—
1991–92	Quebec Nordiques	NHL	80	33	43	76	103	—	—	—	—	—
1992–93	Quebec Nordiques	NHL	80	47	67	114	96	6	3	1	4	6
1993–94	Quebec Nordiques	NHL	84	32	53	85	60	—	—	—	—	—
1994–95	Djurgårdens IF	SEL	12	7	2	9	14	—	—	—	—	—
1994–95	Toronto Maple Leafs	NHL	47	23	24	47	14	7	5	4	9	4
1995–96	Toronto Maple Leafs	NHL	76	33	50	83	46	6	3	1	4	4
1996–97	Toronto Maple Leafs	NHL	82	41	53	94	59	—	—	—	—	—
1997–98	Toronto Maple Leafs	NHL	82	33	41	74	49	—	—	—	—	—
1998–99	Toronto Maple Leafs	NHL	82	31	52	83	58	17	8	8	16	16
1999–00	Toronto Maple Leafs	NHL	73	32	41	73	46	12	3	5	8	10
2000–01	Toronto Maple Leafs	NHL	82	28	46	74	76	11	6	7	13	14
2001–02	Toronto Maple Leafs	NHL	82	41	39	80	94	8	2	5	7	4
2002–03	Toronto Maple Leafs	NHL	75	37	35	72	58	7	1	3	4	6
2003–04	Toronto Maple Leafs	NHL	81	31	44	75	52	9	4	5	9	8
2005–06	Toronto Maple Leafs	NHL	70	31	47	78	58	—	—	—	—	—
2006–07	Toronto Maple Leafs	NHL	75	27	49	76	62	—	—	—	—	—
2007–08	Toronto Maple Leafs	NHL	74	32	46	78	76	—	—	—	—	—
2008–09	Vancouver Canucks	NHL	41	9	19	28	28	8	3	5	8	2
NHL totals			1,346	564	785	1,349	1,093	91	38	44	82	74

=== International ===
Year	Team	Event	GP	G	A	Pts	PIM
1989	Sweden	EJC	6	5	4	9	8
1990	Sweden	EJC	6	6	2	8	14
1990	Sweden	WJC	7	5	2	7	6
1990	Sweden	WC	4	0	0	0	0
1991	Sweden	WC	10	7	5	12	12
1991	Sweden	CC	6	2	4	6	16
1992	Sweden	WC	8	2	6	8	8
1994	Sweden	WC	8	5	9	14	4
1996	Sweden	WCH	4	4	3	7	4
1998	Sweden	OLY	4	3	0	3	4
1998	Sweden	WC	10	5	6	11	6
2001	Sweden	WC	2	0	1	1	2
2002	Sweden	OLY	4	5	4	9	10
2003	Sweden	WC	7	6	4	10	10
2004	Sweden	WCH	4	1	4	5	0
2006	Sweden	OLY	8	3	5	8	4
Junior totals			19	16	8	24	26
Senior totals			79	43	51	94	80

== See also ==
- List of Swedes in sports
- List of NHL players with 500 goals
- List of NHL players with 1,000 points
- List of NHL players with 1,000 games played
- List of NHL players with 100 point seasons
- List of NHL statistical leaders
- List of players with five or more goals in an NHL game

Awards and achievements
Preceded by Mike Modano	NHL first overall draft pick 1989	Succeeded by Owen Nolan
Preceded by Daniel Dore	Quebec Nordiques first-round draft pick 1989	Succeeded by Owen Nolan
Preceded by Calle Johansson; Peter Forsberg; Markus Näslund	Winner of the Viking Award; 1993–1994; 1997; 2002	Succeeded by Mikael Renberg; Peter Forsberg; Markus Näslund
Sporting positions
Preceded by Doug Gilmour	Toronto Maple Leafs captain 1997–2008	Succeeded by Dion Phaneuf
