= Daniel Doré =

Canadian ice hockey player (born 1970)

- Born: April 9, 1970 (age 56) Ferme-Neuve, Quebec, Canada
- Height: 6 ft 3 in (191 cm)
- Weight: 202 lb (92 kg; 14 st 6 lb)
- Position: Right wing
- Shot: Right
- Played for: Quebec Nordiques
- NHL draft: 5th overall, 1988; Quebec Nordiques
- Playing career: 1989–1994

Daniel Doré (born April 9, 1970) is a Canadian former professional ice hockey right winger. He was drafted in the first round, fifth overall, by the Quebec Nordiques in the 1988 NHL entry draft. He played just 17 games in the National Hockey League (NHL), all with the Nordiques: 16 in the 1989–90 season and one more the next season.

After his professional career, Doré played three seasons in the Roller Hockey International (RHI) before retiring in 1996. From there, he served as a scout for the Boston Bruins for 11 years until he was fired in June 2007.

Doré is currently an Amateur Scout for the New York Rangers.

== Career statistics ==
			Regular season					Playoffs
Season	Team	League	GP	G	A	Pts	PIM	GP	G	A	Pts	PIM
1985–86	Outaouais Frontalliers	QMAAA	41	8	12	20	60	—	—	—	—	—
1986–87	Drummondville Voltigeurs	QMJHL	68	23	41	64	229	8	0	1	1	18
1987–88	Drummondville Voltigeurs	QMJHL	64	24	39	63	223	17	7	11	18	42
1988–89	Drummondville Voltigeurs	QMJHL	62	33	58	91	236	4	2	3	5	14
1989–90	Quebec Nordiques	NHL	16	2	3	5	59	—	—	—	—	—
1989–90	Chicoutimi Saguenéens	QMJHL	24	6	23	29	112	6	0	3	3	27
1990–91	Halifax Citadels	AHL	50	7	10	17	139	—	—	—	—	—
1990–91	Quebec Nordiques	NHL	1	0	0	0	0	—	—	—	—	—
1991–92	Halifax Citadels	AHL	29	4	1	5	45	—	—	—	—	—
1991–92	Greensboro Monarchs	ECHL	6	1	0	1	34	—	—	—	—	—
1992–93	Hershey Bears	AHL	65	12	10	22	192	—	—	—	—	—
1993–94	Chatham Wheels	CoHL	4	1	2	3	13	—	—	—	—	—
NHL totals			17	2	3	5	59	—	—	—	—	—
AHL totals			144	23	21	44	376	—	—	—	—	—

Preceded by Curtis Leschyshyn	Quebec Nordiques first-round draft pick 1988	Succeeded by Mats Sundin
