= Wade Belak =

Canadian ice hockey player (1976–2011)

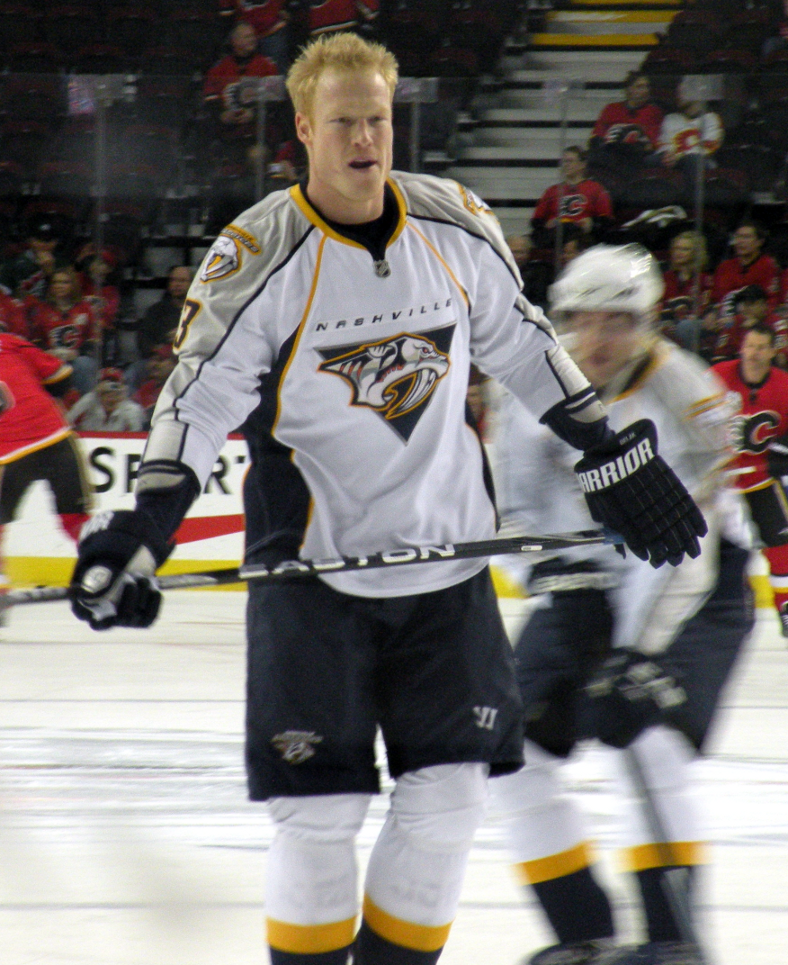
- Belak with the Nashville Predators in 2009
- Born: July 3, 1976 Saskatoon, Saskatchewan, Canada
- Died: August 31, 2011 (aged 35) Toronto, Ontario, Canada
- Height: 6 ft 5 in (196 cm)
- Weight: 222 lb (101 kg; 15 st 12 lb)
- Position: Right wing/Defenceman
- Shot: Right
- Played for: Colorado Avalanche; Calgary Flames; Toronto Maple Leafs; Coventry Blaze; Florida Panthers; Nashville Predators
- NHL draft: 12th overall, 1994; Quebec Nordiques
- Playing career: 1996–2011

Wade William Belak (né Aadland; July 3, 1976 – August 31, 2011) was a Canadian professional ice hockey forward and defenceman. He was drafted 12th overall by the Quebec Nordiques in the 1994 NHL entry draft. He played for the Colorado Avalanche, Calgary Flames, Toronto Maple Leafs, Florida Panthers, and the Nashville Predators in the National Hockey League (NHL). Belak was best known for his role as an enforcer.

== Playing career ==
=== Saskatoon Blades ===
Belak made his WHL debut with the Saskatoon Blades as a 16-year-old during the 1992–93 season, getting no points in seven games, along with 23 PIM. In seven playoff games, Belak had no points. He made the Blades as a full-time player in 1993–94, scoring four goals and 17 points in 69 games, while recording a team high 226 PIM. In 16 playoff games, Belak had two goals, four points and 43 PIM. After the season, Belak was drafted in the first round, 12th overall by the Quebec Nordiques in the 1994 NHL entry draft.

In 1994–95, Belak appeared in all 72 games, scoring four goals and 18 points, while finished fourth in the league with 290 PIM. In the playoffs, Belak had no points in nine games, while recording 36 PIM. He returned to the Blades for the 1995–96 season, scoring three goals and 18 points in 63 games, while getting a team high 207 PIM. In four playoff games, Belak had no points and nine penalty minutes.

=== Quebec Nordiques/Colorado Avalanche ===
Belak made his professional debut during the 1994–95 AHL playoffs, when the Quebec Nordiques assigned Belak to the Cornwall Aces. In 11 playoff games, Belak had a goal and three points, while getting 40 PIM. During the 1995 off-season, the Nordiques relocated to Denver, Colorado, and became the Colorado Avalanche. In the 1995–96 season, Belak appeared in five regular season games with the Aces, getting no points, followed by two playoff games, where he also had no points.

Belak spent most of the 1996–97 season with the Hershey Bears, where in 65 games, Belak had a goal and eight points, as well as a team high 320 PIM. In 16 playoff games, Belak had an assist and 61 PIM. He made his NHL debut during the 1996–97 season with the Colorado Avalanche on December 21, 1996, getting no points in a 6–2 loss to the Toronto Maple Leafs. Overall, Belak appeared in five games with Colorado, going pointless with 11 PIM. Belak began the 1997–98 with the Avalanche, and on October 22, 1997, Belak had a goal and assist against Olaf Kolzig of the Washington Capitals to record his first NHL points in a 4–3 win. Belak had an injury plagued season, appearing in eight games with Colorado, getting two points and 27 PIM, while in 11 games with Hershey, Belak had no points and 30 PIM.

He began the 1998–99 in Colorado, and in 22 games with the Avalanche, Belak had no points and 71 PIM. He also appeared in 17 games with Hershey, getting an assist and 49 PIM. On February 28, 1999, the Avalanche traded Belak, Rene Corbet, Robyn Regehr, and the Avalanche's second round draft pick at the 2000 NHL entry draft to the Calgary Flames for Theoren Fleury and Chris Dingman.

=== Calgary Flames ===
Belak began his Calgary Flames career with the teams AHL affiliate, the Saint John Flames in the 1998–99 season, appearing in 12 games with Saint John, getting two assists and 43 PIM. He made his Calgary debut on March 27, 1999, as Belak had no points in a 2–1 loss to the Phoenix Coyotes. Belak earned his first point as a Flame on April 1, 1999, getting an assist in a 4–1 loss to the Coyotes, that being his only point in nine games with Calgary. At the conclusion of the regular season, Belak was sent back to Saint John for the playoffs, where he had an assist in six games, along with 23 PIM.

Belak spent the entire 1999–2000 season in the NHL, where he appeared in 40 games with Calgary, recording two assists and a team high 122 PIM. He suffered a shoulder injury on February 10, 2000 against the Colorado Avalanche that caused him to miss six weeks of action. He began the 2000–01 season with the Flames, where in 23 games, Belak had no points and 79 PIM. On February 16, 2001, the Toronto Maple Leafs claimed Belak off waivers.

=== Toronto Maple Leafs ===
Belak made his Toronto Maple Leafs debut on February 17, 2001, getting no points in a 5–5 tie against the Colorado Avalanche. He scored his first goal and point as a Maple Leaf on February 25, 2001, scoring against Jocelyn Thibault in a 6–4 loss to the Chicago Blackhawks. It was Belak's first goal since October 22, 1997, when he was a member of the Avalanche. He finished the season appearing in 16 games with Toronto, scoring a goal and an assist, as well as 31 PIM.

Belak played in 63 games with Toronto during the 2001–02 season, scoring a goal and four points, while recording 142 PIM, which was second to Tie Domi on the team. Belak made his playoff debut on April 18, 2002, getting no points in a 3–1 win over the New York Islanders. He scored his first playoff goal and point on April 28, 2002, scoring against Chris Osgood in a 5–3 loss to the Islanders. Belak appeared in 16 playoff games for Toronto, getting one goal and 18 PIM. He had his most productive season during 2002–03, as Belak had three goals and nine points in 55 games, as well as a team high 196 PIM. In the playoffs, Belak appeared in two games, getting no points and four penalty minutes.

Belak had an injury plagued 2003–04 season, as he suffered an abdominal injury on November 20, 2003 against the Edmonton Oilers and a knee injury on January 6, 2004 against the Nashville Predators. He appeared in 39 games, getting a goal and two points, along with 110 PIM. In four playoff games, Belak had no points and 14 PIM.

During the 2004-05 NHL lock-out, Belak signed with the Coventry Blaze of the EIHL. In 42 games with the Blaze, Belak had seven goals and 17 points and 178 PIM. In the playoffs, Belak had a goal and two points in eight games. After the season, Belak was named to the EIHL Second All-Star Team. Belak returned to the Maple Leafs for the 2005–06 season, as in 55 games, he had three assists and 109 PIM, second highest on the team. In 2006–07, Belak appeared in 65 games with Toronto, getting three assists and 110 PIM, again finishing with the second highest penalty minute total on the Leafs.

Belak began the 2007–08 with the Maple Leafs, and on December 4, 2007, Belak ended his 143-game scoreless drought, as he scored against Chris Mason of the Predators in a 3–1 Maple Leafs win. He played in 30 games with Toronto, scoring the lone goal, while getting 66 PIM. On February 26, 2008, the Maple Leafs traded Belak to the Florida Panthers for the Panthers fifth round draft pick in the 2008 NHL entry draft.

=== Florida Panthers ===
Belak finished the 2007–08 with the Florida Panthers, playing in 17 games, getting no points and 12 PIM. His first game as a Panther was on February 27, 2008 against his former team, the Toronto Maple Leafs. He began the 2008–09 season with Florida, where in 15 games, he had no points 25 PIM. On November 27, 2008, the Panthers traded Belak to the Nashville Predators for Nick Tarnasky.

=== Nashville Predators ===
Belak made his Predators debut during the 2008–09 season, as on November 28, 2008, he suited up against the Atlanta Thrashers, earning no points. He recorded his first point as a Predator on December 4, 2008, getting an assist in a 3–2 win over the Colorado Avalanche. Belak finished the season appearing in 38 games with Nashville, recording two assists, and 54 PIM. In 2009–10, Belak returned to the Predators, getting two assists in 39 games, as well as 58 PIM.

Belak played his last season in the NHL in 2010–11, going pointless in 15 games with the Predators. On February 25, 2011, the Predators placed Belak on waivers, however, he went unclaimed. The club then assigned Belak to the Milwaukee Admirals of the AHL, however, on March 8, 2011, Belak retired, due to arthritis in the pelvis, Belak remained with the Predators in an organizational role.

== Personal life ==
Belak was born in St. Paul's Hospital in Saskatoon, Saskatchewan, to Lorraine and Lionel Aadland. His mother, Lorraine, married Barry Belak when Wade was four years old and they took his surname. When he was six years old, his family moved to Battleford where he attended St Vital's Catholic School, Battleford Junior High, and North Battleford Comprehensive High School. By age 14, he was aiming to become a certified lifeguard. His younger brother, Graham, played in several lower-tier leagues and was drafted by the Colorado Avalanche, 53rd overall, in the 1997 NHL entry draft, although he never played in the NHL.

On July 20, 2002, Belak married Jennifer Jordan Russell in Banff, Alberta. The couple had two daughters, both born in Toronto, one in 2004 and the other in 2006.

== Death ==
At approximately 1:33 p.m. on August 31, 2011, Belak was found dead in a condo at the One King Street West hotel in Toronto. Police did not confirm a cause of his death, but Toronto Police treated it as a suicide. He was 35 years old, and had been preparing to take part in the upcoming season of Battle of the Blades. His death was the third in a series of NHL players found dead in a four-month span, following Derek Boogaard and Rick Rypien. His mother stated that he had been suffering from depression. Canadian sports journalist Michael Landsberg reported that he had spoken with Belak one week before his death about their mutual depression, and that Belak admitted having been on "happy pills" for the previous four to five years. Landsberg stated that Belak was amenable to appearing in a documentary on celebrity depression that Landsberg was working on and going public about his condition.

On September 2, 2011, P. J. Stock suggested that Belak's death might not be suicide. "Let's just call it an accidental death right now. But he did die of strangulation" said Stock. On September 21, 2011, Stock expressed regret for making those comments, explained that he did not have any information about Belak's death that was not public, and said "I just wanted to protect Wade, protect his family and his role in the game." Belak's family members have stated that they believe his death was accidental.

Belak's funeral was held in Nashville, with friends, family, and former teammates in attendance.

Following his death, he was diagnosed with chronic traumatic encephalopathy (CTE), a neurodegenerative disease linked to repeated head trauma. Boogaard and Rypien were also enforcers who died with CTE.

== Career statistics ==
			Regular season					Playoffs
Season	Team	League	GP	G	A	Pts	PIM	GP	G	A	Pts	PIM
1992–93	Battlefords North Stars	SJHL	50	5	15	20	146	—	—	—	—	—
1992–93	Saskatoon Blades	WHL	7	0	0	0	23	7	0	0	0	0
1993–94	Saskatoon Blades	WHL	69	4	13	17	226	16	2	2	4	43
1994–95	Saskatoon Blades	WHL	72	4	14	18	290	9	0	0	0	36
1994–95	Cornwall Aces	AHL	—	—	—	—	—	11	1	2	3	40
1995–96	Saskatoon Blades	WHL	63	3	15	18	207	4	0	0	0	9
1995–96	Cornwall Aces	AHL	5	0	0	0	18	2	0	0	0	2
1996–97	Colorado Avalanche	NHL	5	0	0	0	11	—	—	—	—	—
1996–97	Hershey Bears	AHL	65	1	7	8	320	16	0	1	1	61
1997–98	Hershey Bears	AHL	11	0	0	0	30	—	—	—	—	—
1997–98	Colorado Avalanche	NHL	8	1	1	2	27	—	—	—	—	—
1998–99	Hershey Bears	AHL	17	0	1	1	49	—	—	—	—	—
1998–99	Colorado Avalanche	NHL	22	0	0	0	71	—	—	—	—	—
1998–99	Saint John Flames	AHL	12	0	2	2	43	6	0	1	1	23
1998–99	Calgary Flames	NHL	9	0	1	1	23	—	—	—	—	—
1999–2000	Calgary Flames	NHL	40	0	2	2	122	—	—	—	—	—
2000–01	Calgary Flames	NHL	23	0	0	0	79	—	—	—	—	—
2000–01	Toronto Maple Leafs	NHL	16	1	1	2	31	—	—	—	—	—
2001–02	Toronto Maple Leafs	NHL	63	1	3	4	142	16	1	0	1	18
2002–03	Toronto Maple Leafs	NHL	55	3	6	9	196	2	0	0	0	4
2003–04	Toronto Maple Leafs	NHL	34	1	1	2	109	4	0	0	0	14
2004–05	Coventry Blaze	EIHL	42	7	10	17	178	—	—	—	—	—
2005–06	Toronto Maple Leafs	NHL	55	0	3	3	109	—	—	—	—	—
2006–07	Toronto Maple Leafs	NHL	65	0	3	3	110	—	—	—	—	—
2007–08	Toronto Maple Leafs	NHL	30	1	0	1	66	—	—	—	—	—
2007–08	Florida Panthers	NHL	17	0	0	0	12	—	—	—	—	—
2008–09	Florida Panthers	NHL	15	0	0	0	25	—	—	—	—	—
2008–09	Nashville Predators	NHL	38	0	2	2	54	—	—	—	—	—
2009–10	Nashville Predators	NHL	39	0	2	2	58	—	—	—	—	—
2010–11	Nashville Predators	NHL	15	0	0	0	18	—	—	—	—	—
NHL totals			549	8	25	33	1263	22	1	0	1	36

Awards and achievements
Preceded by Adam Deadmarsh	Quebec Nordiques first-round draft pick 1994	Succeeded by Jeff Kealty
