= Curtis Leschyshyn =

Canadian ice hockey player (born 1969)

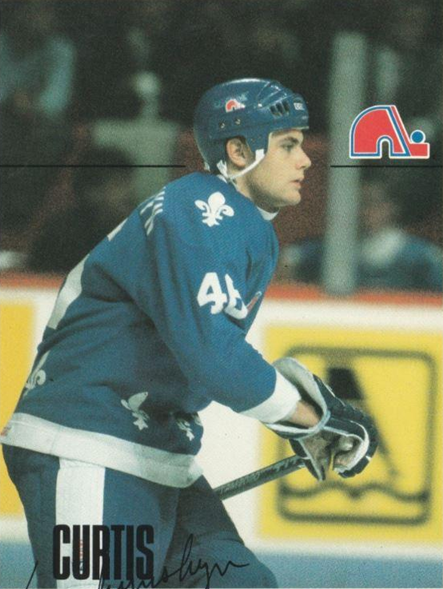
- Born: September 21, 1969 (age 56) Thompson, Manitoba, Canada
- Height: 6 ft 1 in (185 cm)
- Weight: 205 lb (93 kg; 14 st 9 lb)
- Position: Defence
- Shot: Left
- Played for: Quebec Nordiques; Colorado Avalanche; Washington Capitals; Hartford Whalers; Carolina Hurricanes; Minnesota Wild; Ottawa Senators
- National team: Canada
- NHL draft: 3rd overall, 1988; Quebec Nordiques
- Playing career: 1988–2004

Curtis Michael Leschyshyn (/lɛˈsɪʃʌn/ leh-SIH-shuhn; born September 21, 1969) is a Canadian former professional ice hockey player. Leschyshyn played 1,033 games in the National Hockey League. He is the only NHL player to have played for two relocated franchises, both before and after relocation, the Nordiques/Avalanche and the Whalers/Hurricanes. Since he was drafted and played for the Wild in their inaugural season, he is the only NHL player to have played for three new teams in their inaugural season in the league (2 relocated teams and 1 expansion team). In addition, he also played for the two national capital city franchises in the NHL, the Capitals and the Senators.

== Playing career ==
=== Junior hockey ===
==== Saskatoon Blades (1985–1988) ====
Leschyshyn appeared in only one game with the Saskatoon Blades of the Western Hockey League during the 1985–86 season, earning no points.

He earned a regular spot on the roster of the Blades during the 1986–87 season, in which Leschyshyn scored 14 goals and 40 points in 70 games, leading all defensemen in goals and second in points. In 11 postseason games, Leschyshyn scored a goal and six points.

Leschyshyn had a very strong season with the Blades in 1987–88 as he scored 14 goals and 55 points in 56 games, helping the club finish with the best record in the WHL. In the postseason, Leschyshyn scored two goals and seven points in 10 games. Following the season, he was named to the WHL East First All-Star Team.

=== Professional career ===
==== Quebec Nordiques/Colorado Avalanche (1988–1996) ====
Leschyshyn was drafted by the Quebec Nordiques in the first round, third overall, in the 1988 NHL entry draft held at the Montreal Forum in Montreal, Quebec.

Leschyshyn played in his first career NHL game on October 6, 1988, earning no points in a 5–2 victory over the Hartford Whalers. On October 20, Leschyshyn earned his first career NHL point, as he assisted on a goal scored by Gord Donnelly in a 5–2 loss to the Philadelphia Flyers. He scored his first career NHL goal against Rick Wamsley of the Calgary Flames on December 6, as the Nordiques lost to the Flames 3–2. Overall, in his rookie season in 1988–89, Leschyshyn scored four goals and 13 points in 71 games.

In 1989–90, Leschyshyn appeared in 68 games with Quebec, scoring two goals and eight points, while finishing the season with a -41 rating, as the rebuilding Nordiques finished in last place in the NHL standings.

Leschyshyn earned his first multi-point game of his career on December 7, 1990, as he scored a goal and earned an assist in 5–3 win over the Calgary Flames. In a season shortened to 55 games due to injuries, Leschyshyn scored three goals and 10 points during the 1990–91 season.

The 1991–92 was another season in which Leschyshyn was hampered due to injuries, however, in 42 games, he scored five goals and 17 points. On March 31, Leschyshyn had his first multi-goal game, as he scored two goals against Andy Moog of the Boston Bruins, and added an assist for his first career three point game, as the Nordiques lost to Boston 5–4. Leschyshyn also appeared in six games with the Halifax Citadels of the American Hockey League during 1991–92, earning two assists.

Leschyshyn broke out offensively during the 1992–93, as he scored a career high nine goals and 32 points in 82 games with the Nordiques, helping the club reach the postseason for the first time in his career. On April 18, Leschyshyn played in his first career playoff game, earning no points in a 3–2 win over the Montreal Canadiens. Two days later, on April 20, Leschyshyn scored his first career playoff goal against Patrick Roy, as the Nordiques defeated the Canadiens 4–1. In six playoff games, Leschyshyn had a goal and two points.

In 1993–94, Leschyshyn saw his offensive production drop to five goals and 22 points in 72 games, as the Nordiques struggled and failed to qualify for the postseason. On October 28, Leschyshyn earned two assists and had a +5 rating in a 7–3 win over the Pittsburgh Penguins.

During the lockout shortened 1994–95 season, Leschyshyn scored two goals and 15 points in 44 games, while earning a +29 rating, as the Nordiques finished with the best record in the Eastern Conference. In the postseason, Leschyshyn was limited to three games, where he earned an assist.

The Nordiques franchise relocated to Denver, Colorado and were renamed as the Colorado Avalanche for the 1995–96. On October 6, 1995, the Avalanche played their first game, as Leschyshyn was held without a point in a 3–2 win over the Detroit Red Wings. In 77 games, Leschyshyn scored four goals and 19 points, while earning a career high rating of +32. In 17 playoff games, Leschyshyn scored a goal and three points, as the Avalanche won the Stanley Cup, defeating the Florida Panthers in four games in the final round.

Leschyshyn began the 1996–97 season with the Avalanche, as in 11 games, he earned five assists. On October 30, in what would be his last game with Colorado, Leschyshyn earned two assists in a 6–3 win over the St. Louis Blues.

On November 2, 1996, Leschyshyn and Chris Simon were traded to the Washington Capitals in exchange for Keith Jones, the Capitals first round selection in the 1998 NHL entry draft, and the Capitals fourth round pick in the 1998 NHL entry draft.

==== Washington Capitals (1996) ====
On November 6, 1996, Leschyshyn skated in his first game with the Washington Capitals, earning no points in a 2–1 win over the Tampa Bay Lightning. Overall, he appeared in two games with Washington in 1996–97, earning no points.

On November 9, just one week after being acquired by the team, Washington traded Leschyshyn to the Hartford Whalers for Andrei Nikolishin.

==== Hartford Whalers/Carolina Hurricanes (1996–2000) ====
Leschyshyn joined the Hartford Whalers on November 9, 1996, and in his first game with the club on the same date, he made an immediate impact, as Leschyshyn scored the overtime winning goal for the Whalers against Dominik Hašek of the Buffalo Sabres in a 4–3 victory. In his second game with the Whalers three nights later, Leschyshyn scored the opening goal in a 4–3 win over the San Jose Sharks. In 64 games with the Whalers in the 1996–97, he scored four goals and 17 points.

Leschyshyn remained with the club during their relocation from Hartford to Carolina in the summer of 1997, as the team was renamed to the Carolina Hurricanes. After starting the season injured, Leschyshyn played in his first game with the Hurricanes on October 10, 1997, as he was held without a point in a 2–1 win over the New Jersey Devils. In 73 games in 1997–98, Leschyshyn scored two goals and 12 points.

In 1998–99, Leschyshyn appeared in 65 games with Carolina, scoring two goals and nine points, helping the team reach the postseason. On April 22, 1999, he played in his first playoff game with the Hurricanes, earning no points in 2–0 loss to the Boston Bruins. In five playoff games, Leschyshyn had no points.

Leschyshyn struggled offensively during the 1999–00 season, as he scored no goals and had two assists in 53 games. Following the season, the Hurricanes left Leschyshyn unprotected for the upcoming expansion draft.

On June 23, 2000, the Minnesota Wild selected Leschyshyn in the 2000 NHL Expansion Draft.

==== Minnesota Wild (2000–2001) ====
Leschyshyn began the 2000–01 on the newly formed Minnesota Wild. On October 6, 2000, Leschyshyn played in the first ever game for the Wild, as he had no points in a 3–1 loss to the Mighty Ducks of Anaheim. On November 24, he earned his first point as a member of the Wild, an assist on a goal scored by Peter Bartos, in a 2–0 win over the Chicago Blackhawks. On January 3, Leschyshyn scored his first goal on Minnesota, as he scored against Damian Rhodes of the Atlanta Thrashers in a 1–1 tie. In 54 games with the Wild, Leschyshyn scored two goals and five points in 2000–01.

On March 13, 2001, Leschyshyn was traded to the Ottawa Senators for a third round pick in the 2001 NHL entry draft and future considerations.

==== Ottawa Senators (2001–2004) ====
Leschyshyn joined the Ottawa Senators as a trade deadline acquisition to bolster their defense. On March 14, 2001, Leschyshyn played in his first game with the Senators, earning an assist on a goal scored by Mike Sillinger in an 8–1 victory over the Atlanta Thrashers. In 11 games with Ottawa in 2000–01, Leschyshyn earned four assists. On April 13, Leschyshyn played in his first playoff game with the Senators, as he was held with no points in a 1–0 loss to the Toronto Maple Leafs. In four postseason games, Leschyshyn was held off the score sheet.

Leschyshyn remained with the Senators for the 2001–02 season after he signed a three-year, $6 million contract with the club on July 3, 2001. On December 8, Leschyshyn earned three assists in a 5–2 win over the Tampa Bay Lightning. On March 16, Leschyshyn scored his first goal as a Senator, as he scored against Chris Osgood of the New York Islanders in a 4–3 victory. In 79 games in the 2001–02 season, Leschyshyn scored a goal and 10 points. In the postseason, Leschyshyn earned his first playoff point with Ottawa with an assist on a goal scored by Mike Fisher in a 3–2 loss to the Toronto Maple Leafs on May 4. In 12 playoff games, Leschyshyn earned an assist.

In 2002–03, Leschyshyn played in 55 games with the Senators, scoring a goal and seven points, as he helped the team win the Presidents' Trophy as the top regular season team in the NHL. In 18 playoff games, Leschyshyn earned an assist.

On January 1, 2004, Leschyshyn played in his 1000th career NHL game, as Ottawa shutout the New York Islanders 1–0. In 56 games with the Senators in 2003–04, Leschyshyn played in 56 games, scoring a goal and five points. In two playoff games, he was held without a point.

Following the season, Leschyshyn was granted free agency.

==== Colorado Avalanche (2005) ====
On August 17, 2005, Leschyshyn signed with the Colorado Avalanche, returning to the franchise he played with from 1988 until 1996. His stay with Colorado was short-lived, as Leschyshyn retired prior to the 2005–06 season.

== Post-playing career ==
In retirement, Leschyshyn was a member of the Avalanche radio broadcast team providing color commentary. However, he stepped down prior to the 2007–08 season to spend more time with his family. Leschyshyn and his wife, Laura, reside in Saskatoon, Saskatchewan with their three children, son Jake, who is also a professional hockey player, and daughters Anna and Kate. He was an assistant coach with the Saskatoon Blades of the Western Hockey League before remaining to coach at the lower junior minor league level.

Leschyshyn returned to the Avalanche organization as a professional scout prior to the 2018–19 season.

Leschyshyn is an avid cyclist and cycles 40–50 miles a day. He has been a participant on Battle of the Blades.

== Career statistics ==
=== Regular season and playoffs ===
			Regular season					Playoffs
Season	Team	League	GP	G	A	Pts	PIM	GP	G	A	Pts	PIM
1985–86	Saskatoon Blazers AAA	SMHL	34	9	34	43	52	—	—	—	—	—
1985–86	Saskatoon Blades	WHL	1	0	0	0	0	—	—	—	—	—
1986–87	Saskatoon Blades	WHL	70	14	26	40	107	11	1	5	6	14
1987–88	Saskatoon Blades	WHL	56	14	41	55	86	10	2	5	7	16
1988–89	Quebec Nordiques	NHL	71	4	9	13	71	—	—	—	—	—
1989–90	Quebec Nordiques	NHL	68	2	6	8	44	—	—	—	—	—
1990–91	Quebec Nordiques	NHL	55	3	7	10	49	—	—	—	—	—
1991–92	Halifax Citadels	AHL	6	0	2	2	4	—	—	—	—	—
1991–92	Quebec Nordiques	NHL	42	5	12	17	42	—	—	—	—	—
1992–93	Quebec Nordiques	NHL	82	9	23	32	61	6	1	1	2	6
1993–94	Quebec Nordiques	NHL	72	5	17	22	65	—	—	—	—	—
1994–95	Quebec Nordiques	NHL	44	2	13	15	20	3	0	1	1	4
1995–96	Colorado Avalanche	NHL	77	4	15	19	73	17	1	2	3	8
1996–97	Colorado Avalanche	NHL	11	0	5	5	6	—	—	—	—	—
1996–97	Washington Capitals	NHL	2	0	0	0	2	—	—	—	—	—
1996–97	Hartford Whalers	NHL	64	4	13	17	30	—	—	—	—	—
1997–98	Carolina Hurricanes	NHL	73	2	10	12	45	—	—	—	—	—
1998–99	Carolina Hurricanes	NHL	65	2	7	9	50	6	0	0	0	6
1999–2000	Carolina Hurricanes	NHL	53	0	2	2	14	—	—	—	—	—
2000–01	Minnesota Wild	NHL	54	2	3	5	19	—	—	—	—	—
2000–01	Ottawa Senators	NHL	11	0	4	4	0	4	0	0	0	0
2001–02	Ottawa Senators	NHL	79	1	9	10	44	12	0	1	1	0
2002–03	Ottawa Senators	NHL	54	1	6	7	18	18	0	1	1	10
2003–04	Ottawa Senators	NHL	56	1	4	5	16	2	0	0	0	0
NHL totals			1,033	47	165	212	669	68	2	6	8	34

=== International ===
Year	Team	Event	Result	GP	G	A	Pts	PIM
1990	Canada	WC	4th	9	0	0	0	4
Senior totals				9	0	0	0	4

== Awards and honours ==
Award	Year
WHL East First Team All-Star	1987–88
NHL
Stanley Cup (Colorado Avalanche)	1996

== See also ==
- List of NHL players with 1,000 games played

Awards and achievements
Preceded by Joe Sakic	Quebec Nordiques first-round draft pick 1988	Succeeded by Daniel Dore
