= List of Quebec Nordiques draft picks =

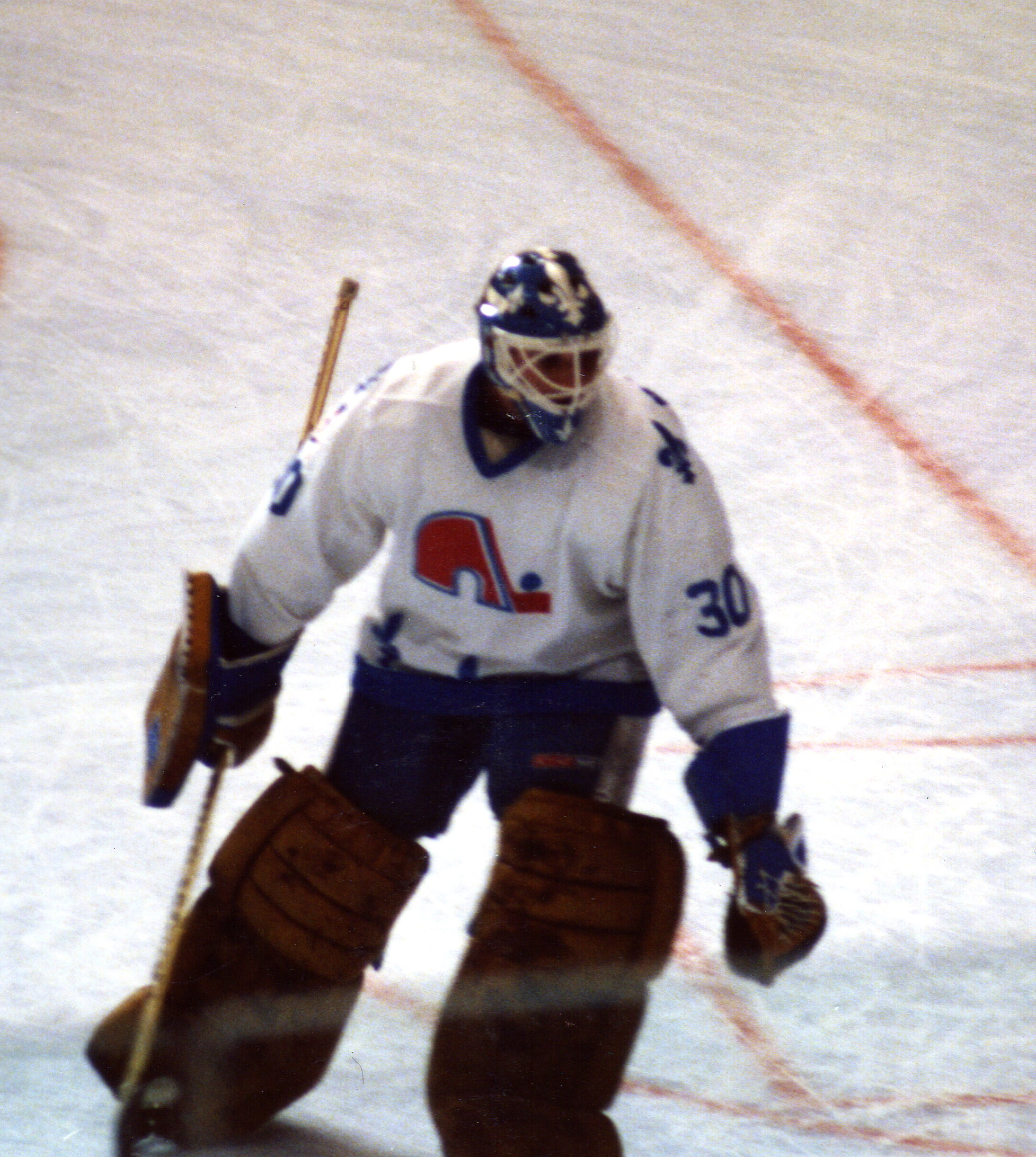
The Nordiques selected Clint Malarchuk 74th overall in the 1981 NHL entry draft.

This is a complete list of ice hockey players who were drafted in the National Hockey League Entry Draft by the Quebec Nordiques franchise. It includes every player who was drafted, regardless of whether they played for the team.

== Key ==
# Played at least one game with the Nordiques
↑ Spent entire NHL career with the Nordiques
(†) Inducted into the Hockey Hall of Fame
(‡) Number retired by the Nordiques

General terms and abbreviations
Term or abbreviation	Definition
Draft	The year that the player was selected
Round	The round of the draft in which the player was selected
Pick	The overall position in the draft at which the player was selected
S	Supplemental draft selection

Position abbreviations
Abbreviation	Definition
G	Goaltender
D	Defence
LW	Left wing
C	Centre
RW	Right wing
F	Forward

Abbreviations for statistical columns
Abbreviation	Definition
Pos	Position
GP	Games played
G	Goals
A	Assists
Pts	Points
PIM	Penalties in minutes
W	Wins
L	Losses
T	Ties
OT	Overtime/shootout losses
GAA	Goals against average
—	Does not apply

== Draft picks ==
=== WHA ===
Statistics show each player's career regular season totals in the WHA.

Draft	Round	Pick	Player	Nationality	Pos	GP	G	A	Pts	PIM	W	L	T	GAA
1973	1	3	Andre Savard	Canada	C	—	—	—	—	—	—	—	—	—
1973	2	14	Blaine Stoughton	Canada	F	219	89	90	179	121	—	—	—	—
1973	2	17	Morris Titanic	Canada	LW	—	—	—	—	—	—	—	—	—
1973	3	29	Eric Vail	Canada	F	—	—	—	—	—	—	—	—	—
1973	4	42	Jean Landry	Canada	D	—	—	—	—	—	—	—	—	—
1973	5	55	Denis Patry↑	Canada	F	3	1	2	3	2	—	—	—	—
1973	6	68	Dale Cook	Canada	F	—	—	—	—	—	—	—	—	—
1973	7	81	Andre Deschamps	Canada	F	9	1	2	3	19	—	—	—	—
1973	8	94	Bob Stumpf	Canada	D	—	—	—	—	—	—	—	—	—
1973	9	105	Guy Ross	Canada	D	—	—	—	—	—	—	—	—	—
1973	10	116	Michel Belisle	Canada	F	—	—	—	—	—	—	—	—	—
1974	1	9	Real Cloutier	Canada	F	369	283	283	566	169	—	—	—	—
1974	2	24	Charles Constantin#	Canada	LW	192	28	35	63	229	—	—	—	—
1974	4	54	Jean Bernier↑	Canada	D	260	17	84	101	50	—	—	—	—
1974	5	68	Dave Logan	Canada	D	—	—	—	—	—	—	—	—	—
1974	6	83	Michel Bergeron	Canada	RW	—	—	—	—	—	—	—	—	—
1974	7	98	Denis Carufel	Canada	LW	—	—	—	—	—	—	—	—	—
1974	8	113	Claude Dupuis	Canada	LW	—	—	—	—	—	—	—	—	—
1974	9	128	Mario Lessard	Canada	G	—	—	—	—	—	—	—	—	—
1974	10	141	Claude Arvisais	Canada	C	—	—	—	—	—	—	—	—	—
1974	1	12	Alain Daigle	Canada	F	—	—	—	—	—	—	—	—	—
1975	1	14	Pierre Mondou	Canada	F	—	—	—	—	—	—	—	—	—
1975	2	29	Doug Halward	Canada	D	—	—	—	—	—	—	—	—	—
1975	3	44	Pierre Giroux	Canada	LW	—	—	—	—	—	—	—	—	—
1975	4	59	Ted Bulley	Canada	LW	—	—	—	—	—	—	—	—	—
1975	5	73	Andre LePage	Canada	G	—	—	—	—	—	—	—	—	—
1975	6	87	Jean Trottier	Canada	C	—	—	—	—	—	—	—	—	—
1975	7	100	Mike Backman	Canada	RW	—	—	—	—	—	—	—	—	—
1975	8	112	Michel Brisebois	Canada	C	—	—	—	—	—	—	—	—	—
1975	9	124	Michel Hamel	Canada	C	—	—	—	—	—	—	—	—	—
1975	10	137	Florent Fortier↑	Canada	F	4	1	1	2	0	—	—	—	—
1976	1	10	Rick Green	Canada	D	—	—	—	—	—	—	—	—	—
1976	2	19	Bob Manno	Canada	F	—	—	—	—	—	—	—	—	—
1976	3	32	Al Glendinning	Canada	D	—	—	—	—	—	—	—	—	—
1976	4	44	Maurice Barrette	Canada	G	—	—	—	—	—	—	—	—	—
1976	5	56	Garth MacGuigan	Canada	C	—	—	—	—	—	—	—	—	—
1976	6	68	Claude Periard	Canada	LW	—	—	—	—	—	—	—	—	—
1976	7	80	Denis Charbonneau	Canada	G	—	—	—	—	—	—	—	—	—
1976	10	114	Pierre Brassard	Canada	F	—	—	—	—	—	—	—	—	—
1977	1	9	Lucien DeBlois	Canada	F	—	—	—	—	—	—	—	—	—
1977	2	14	John Anderson	Canada	LW	—	—	—	—	—	—	—	—	—
1977	2	20	Benoit Gosselin	Canada	LW	—	—	—	—	—	—	—	—	—
1977	3	29	Tom Roulston	Canada	RW	—	—	—	—	—	—	—	—	—
1977	4	38	Robert Picard	Canada	D	—	—	—	—	—	—	—	—	—
1977	5	47	Alain Cote↑	Canada	LW	106	17	18	35	31	—	—	—	—
1977	6	56	Yves Guillemette	Canada	G	—	—	—	—	—	—	—	—	—
1977	7	65	Eddy Godin	Canada	RW	—	—	—	—	—	—	—	—	—
1977	8	73	Pierre Lagace↑	Canada	C	38	2	5	7	14	—	—	—	—
1977	9	81	Dan Chicoine	Canada	RW	—	—	—	—	—	—	—	—	—
1977	10	89	Roland Cloutier	Canada	C	—	—	—	—	—	—	—	—	—

=== NHL ===
Year	Round	Pick	Player	Nationality	Pos	GP	G	A	Pts	PIM	W	L	T	OT	GAA
1979	1	20	Michel Goulet#†‡	Canada	F	1089	548	604	1152	825	—	—	—	—	—
1979	2	41	Dale Hunter#	Canada	C	1407	323	697	1020	3563	—	—	—	—	—
1979	3	62	Lee Norwood#	United States	D	503	58	153	211	1099	—	—	—	—	—
1979	4	83	Anton Stastny↑	Slovakia	F	650	252	384	636	150	—	—	—	—	—
1979	5	104	Pierre Lacroix#	Canada	LW	274	24	107	131	197	—	—	—	—	—
1979	6	125	Scott McGeown	Canada	D	—	—	—	—	—	—	—	—	—	—
1980	2	24	Normand Rochefort#	Canada	D	598	39	119	158	570	—	—	—	—	—
1980	4	66	Jay Miller	United States	LW	446	40	44	84	1723	—	—	—	—	—
1980	5	87	Basil McRae#	Canada	LW	576	53	83	136	2453	—	—	—	—	—
1980	6	108	Mark Kumpel#	United States	F	288	38	46	84	113	—	—	—	—	—
1980	7	129	Gaston Therrien↑	Canada	D	22	0	8	8	12	—	—	—	—	—
1980	8	150	Michel Bolduc↑	Canada	D	10	0	0	0	6	—	—	—	—	—
1980	9	171	Christian Tanguay↑	Canada	F	2	0	0	0	0	—	—	—	—	—
1980	10	192	Bill Robinson	Canada	D	—	—	—	—	—	—	—	—	—	—
1981	1	11	Randy Moller#	Canada	D	815	45	180	225	1692	—	—	—	—	—
1981	3	53	Jean-Marc Gaulin↑	Canada	RW	26	4	3	7	8	—	—	—	—	—
1981	4	74	Clint Malarchuk#	Canada	G	338	0	14	14	134	141	130	45	—	3.47
1981	5	95	Ed Lee↑	United States	W	2	0	0	0	5	—	—	—	—	—
1981	6	116	Mike Eagles#	Canada	LW	853	74	122	196	928	—	—	—	—	—
1981	8	158	Andre Cote	Canada	F	—	—	—	—	—	—	—	—	—	—
1981	9	179	Marc Brisebois	Canada	F	—	—	—	—	—	—	—	—	—	—
1981	10	200	Kari Takko	Finland	G	142	0	2	2	30	37	71	14	—	3.90
1982	1	13	David Shaw#	Canada	D	769	41	153	194	906	—	—	—	—	—
1982	2	34	Paul Gillis#	Canada	C	624	88	154	242	1498	—	—	—	—	—
1982	3	55	Mario Gosselin#	Canada	G	242	0	9	9	42	91	107	14	—	3.74
1982	4	76	Jiri Lala	Czech Republic	F	—	—	—	—	—	—	—	—	—	—
1982	5	97	Phil Stanger	Canada	D	—	—	—	—	—	—	—	—	—	—
1982	7	131	Daniel Poudrier↑	Canada	D	25	1	5	6	10	—	—	—	—	—
1982	9	181	Mike Hough#	Canada	RW	707	100	156	256	675	—	—	—	—	—
1982	10	202	Vincent Lukac	Czech Republic	F	—	—	—	—	—	—	—	—	—	—
1982	11	223	Andre Martin	Canada	D	—	—	—	—	—	—	—	—	—	—
1982	12	244	Jozef Lukac	Czech Republic	F	—	—	—	—	—	—	—	—	—	—
1982	12	248	Jan Jasko	Slovakia	F	—	—	—	—	—	—	—	—	—	—
1983	2	32	Yves Heroux↑	Canada	RW	1	0	0	0	0	—	—	—	—	—
1983	3	52	Bruce Bell#	Canada	D	209	12	64	76	113	—	—	—	—	—
1983	3	54	Iiro Jarvi↑	Finland	F	116	18	43	61	58	—	—	—	—	—
1983	5	92	Luc Guenette	Canada	G	—	—	—	—	—	—	—	—	—	—
1983	6	112	Brad Walcot	Canada	D	—	—	—	—	—	—	—	—	—	—
1983	7	132	Craig Mack	United States	D	—	—	—	—	—	—	—	—	—	—
1983	8	152	Tommy Albelin#	Sweden	D	952	44	211	255	417	—	—	—	—	—
1983	9	172	Wayne Groulx↑	Canada	C	1	0	0	0	0	—	—	—	—	—
1983	10	192	Scott Shaunessy↑	United States	D	7	0	0	0	23	—	—	—	—	—
1983	12	232	Bo Berglund#	Sweden	F	130	28	39	67	40	—	—	—	—	—
1983	12	239	Jindrich Kokrment	Czech Republic	F	—	—	—	—	—	—	—	—	—	—
1984	1	15	Trevor Stienburg↑	Canada	RW	71	8	4	12	161	—	—	—	—	—
1984	2	36	Jeff Brown#	Canada	D	747	154	431	585	498	—	—	—	—	—
1984	3	57	Steven Finn#	Canada	D	725	34	78	112	1724	—	—	—	—	—
1984	4	78	Terry Perkins	Canada	RW	—	—	—	—	—	—	—	—	—	—
1984	6	120	Darren Cota	Canada	RW	—	—	—	—	—	—	—	—	—	—
1984	7	141	Henrik Cedergren	Sweden	F	—	—	—	—	—	—	—	—	—	—
1984	8	162	Jyrki Maki	Finland	D	—	—	—	—	—	—	—	—	—	—
1984	9	183	Guy Ouellette	Canada	F	—	—	—	—	—	—	—	—	—	—
1984	10	203	Ken Quinney↑	Canada	LW	59	7	13	20	23	—	—	—	—	—
1984	12	244	Peter Loob↑	Sweden	D	8	1	2	3	0	—	—	—	—	—
1985	1	15	David Latta↑	Canada	LW	36	4	8	12	4	—	—	—	—	—
1985	2	36	Jason Lafreniere#	Canada	C	146	34	53	87	22	—	—	—	—	—
1985	3	57	Max Middendorf#	United States	C	13	2	4	6	6	—	—	—	—	—
1985	4	65	Peter Massey	United States	D	—	—	—	—	—	—	—	—	—	—
1985	4	78	David Espe	United States	D	—	—	—	—	—	—	—	—	—	—
1985	5	99	Bruce Major↑	Canada	C	4	0	0	0	0	—	—	—	—	—
1985	6	120	Andy Akervik	United States	C	—	—	—	—	—	—	—	—	—	—
1985	7	141	Mike Oliverio	Canada	F	—	—	—	—	—	—	—	—	—	—
1985	8	162	Mario Brunetta↑	Canada	G	40	0	0	0	16	12	17	1	—	3.90
1985	9	183	Brit Peer	Canada	RW	—	—	—	—	—	—	—	—	—	—
1985	10	204	Tom Sasso	United States	C	—	—	—	—	—	—	—	—	—	—
1985	11	225	Gary Murphy	United States	F	—	—	—	—	—	—	—	—	—	—
1985	12	246	Jean Bois	Canada	F	—	—	—	—	—	—	—	—	—	—
1986	1	18	Ken McRae#	Canada	RW	137	14	21	35	364	—	—	—	—	—
1986	2	39	Jean-Marc Routhier↑	Canada	RW	8	0	0	0	9	—	—	—	—	—
1986	2	41	Stephane Guerard↑	Canada	D	34	0	0	0	40	—	—	—	—	—
1986	4	81	Ron Tugnutt#	Canada	G	538	0	7	7	12	186	239	62	—	3.05
1986	5	102	Gerald Bzdel	Canada	D	—	—	—	—	—	—	—	—	—	—
1986	6	117	Scott White	Canada	D	—	—	—	—	—	—	—	—	—	—
1986	6	123	Morgan Samuelsson	Sweden	F	—	—	—	—	—	—	—	—	—	—
1986	7	134	Mark Vermette↑	Canada	RW	67	5	13	18	33	—	—	—	—	—
1986	7	144	Jean-Francois Nault	Canada	F	—	—	—	—	—	—	—	—	—	—
1986	8	165	Keith Miller	Canada	LW	—	—	—	—	—	—	—	—	—	—
1986	9	186	Pierre Miller	Canada	F	—	—	—	—	—	—	—	—	—	—
1986	10	207	Chris Lappin	United States	D	—	—	—	—	—	—	—	—	—	—
1986	11	228	Martin Latreille	Canada	D	—	—	—	—	—	—	—	—	—	—
1986	12	249	Sean Boudreault	United States	D	—	—	—	—	—	—	—	—	—	—
1986	S	21	Mike Natyshak↑	Canada	F	4	0	0	0	0	—	—	—	—	—
1987	1	9	Bryan Fogarty#	Canada	D	156	22	52	74	119	—	—	—	—	—
1987	1	15	Joe Sakic#†	Canada	C	1378	625	1016	1641	614	—	—	—	—	—
1987	3	51	Jim Sprott	Canada	D	—	—	—	—	—	—	—	—	—	—
1987	4	72	Kip Miller#	United States	C	449	74	165	239	105	—	—	—	—	—
1987	5	93	Rob Mendel	United States	D	—	—	—	—	—	—	—	—	—	—
1987	6	114	Garth Snow#	United States	G	368	0	5	5	190	135	147	43	1	2.80
1987	7	135	Tim Hanus	United States	F	—	—	—	—	—	—	—	—	—	—
1987	8	156	Jake Enebak	United States	D	—	—	—	—	—	—	—	—	—	—
1987	9	177	Jaroslav Sevcik↑	Czech Republic	LW	13	0	2	2	2	—	—	—	—	—
1987	9	183	Ladislav Tresl	Czech Republic	C	—	—	—	—	—	—	—	—	—	—
1987	10	198	Darren Nauss	Canada	W	—	—	—	—	—	—	—	—	—	—
1987	11	219	Mike Williams	United States	G	—	—	—	—	—	—	—	—	—	—
1987	S	11	Mike Hiltner	United States	D	—	—	—	—	—	—	—	—	—	—
1988	1	3	Curtis Leschyshyn#	Canada	D	1033	47	165	212	669	—	—	—	—	—
1988	1	5	Daniel Dore↑	Canada	RW	17	2	3	5	59	—	—	—	—	—
1988	2	24	Stephane Fiset#	Canada	G	390	0	12	12	38	164	153	44	—	3.07
1988	3	45	Petri Aaltonen	Finland	RW	—	—	—	—	—	—	—	—	—	—
1988	4	66	Darin Kimble#	Canada	C	311	23	20	43	1082	—	—	—	—	—
1988	5	87	Stephane Venne	Canada	D	—	—	—	—	—	—	—	—	—	—
1988	6	108	Ed Ward#	Canada	RW	278	23	26	49	354	—	—	—	—	—
1988	7	129	Valeri Kamensky#	Russia	LW	637	200	301	501	383	—	—	—	—	—
1988	8	150	Sakari Lindfors	Finland	G	—	—	—	—	—	—	—	—	—	—
1988	9	171	Dan Wiebe	Canada	LW	—	—	—	—	—	—	—	—	—	—
1988	11	213	Alexei Gusarov#	Russia	D	607	39	128	167	313	—	—	—	—	—
1988	12	234	Claude Lapointe#	Canada	C	879	127	178	305	721	—	—	—	—	—
1988	S	3	Phil Berger	United States	RW	—	—	—	—	—	—	—	—	—	—
1988	S	8	Jamie Baker#	Canada	C	404	71	79	150	271	—	—	—	—	—
1989	1	1	Mats Sundin#†	Sweden	C	1346	564	785	1349	1093	—	—	—	—	—
1989	2	22	Adam Foote#	Canada	D	1154	66	242	308	1534	—	—	—	—	—
1989	3	43	Stephane Morin#	Canada	C	90	16	39	55	52	—	—	—	—	—
1989	3	54	John Tanner↑	Canada	G	21	0	0	0	6	2	11	5	—	3.60
1989	4	68	Niklas Andersson#	Sweden	LW	164	29	53	82	85	—	—	—	—	—
1989	4	76	Eric Dubois	Canada	D	—	—	—	—	—	—	—	—	—	—
1989	5	85	Kevin Kaiser	Canada	LW	—	—	—	—	—	—	—	—	—	—
1989	6	106	Dan Lambert↑	Canada	D	29	6	9	15	22	—	—	—	—	—
1989	7	127	Sergei Mylnikov↑	Russia	G	10	0	0	0	0	1	7	2	—	4.96
1989	8	148	Paul Krake	Canada	G	—	—	—	—	—	—	—	—	—	—
1989	9	169	Vyacheslav Bykov	Russia	C	—	—	—	—	—	—	—	—	—	—
1989	10	190	Andrei Khomutov	Russia	RW	—	—	—	—	—	—	—	—	—	—
1989	11	211	Byron Witkowski	Canada	LW	—	—	—	—	—	—	—	—	—	—
1989	12	232	Noel Rahn	United States	F	—	—	—	—	—	—	—	—	—	—
1989	S	1	Dave DePinto	United States	G	—	—	—	—	—	—	—	—	—	—
1989	S	6	Rick Berens	United States	F	—	—	—	—	—	—	—	—	—	—
1990	1	1	Owen Nolan#	Canada	RW	1200	422	463	885	1793	—	—	—	—	—
1990	2	22	Ryan Hughes	Canada	C	3	0	0	0	0	—	—	—	—	—
1990	3	43	Brad Zavisha	Canada	LW	2	0	0	0	0	—	—	—	—	—
1990	6	106	Jeff Parrott	Canada	D	—	—	—	—	—	—	—	—	—	—
1990	7	127	Dwayne Norris#	Canada	RW	20	2	4	6	8	—	—	—	—	—
1990	8	148	Andrei Kovalenko#	Russia	RW	620	173	206	379	389	—	—	—	—	—
1990	8	158	Alexander Karpovtsev	Russia	D	596	34	154	188	430	—	—	—	—	—
1990	9	169	Pat Mazzoli	Canada	G	—	—	—	—	—	—	—	—	—	—
1990	10	190	Scott Davis	Canada	D	—	—	—	—	—	—	—	—	—	—
1990	11	211	Mika Stromberg	Finland	D	—	—	—	—	—	—	—	—	—	—
1990	12	232	Wade Klippenstein	Canada	LW	—	—	—	—	—	—	—	—	—	—
1990	S	1	Mike McKee↑	Canada	D	48	3	12	15	41	—	—	—	—	—
1990	S	6	Darryl Noren	United States	C	—	—	—	—	—	—	—	—	—	—
1991	1	1	Eric Lindros†	Canada	C	760	372	493	865	1398	—	—	—	—	—
1991	2	24	Rene Corbet#	Canada	LW	362	58	74	132	420	—	—	—	—	—
1991	3	46	Rich Brennan	United States	D	50	2	6	8	33	—	—	—	—	—
1991	4	68	Dave Karpa#	Canada	D	557	18	80	98	1374	—	—	—	—	—
1991	5	90	Patrick Labrecque	Canada	G	2	0	0	0	2	0	1	0	—	4.29
1991	5	103	Bill Lindsay#	Canada	W	777	83	141	224	922	—	—	—	—	—
1991	7	134	Mikael Johansson	Sweden	C	—	—	—	—	—	—	—	—	—	—
1991	8	156	Janne Laukkanen#	Finland	D	407	22	99	121	335	—	—	—	—	—
1991	8	157	Aaron Asp	Canada	C	—	—	—	—	—	—	—	—	—	—
1991	9	178	Adam Bartell	United States	F	—	—	—	—	—	—	—	—	—	—
1991	9	188	Brent Brekke	United States	D	—	—	—	—	—	—	—	—	—	—
1991	10	200	Paul Koch	United States	D	—	—	—	—	—	—	—	—	—	—
1991	11	222	Doug Friedman	United States	LW	18	0	1	1	34	—	—	—	—	—
1991	12	244	Eric Meloche	Canada	RW	—	—	—	—	—	—	—	—	—	—
1991	S	2	Dave Trombley	United States	F	—	—	—	—	—	—	—	—	—	—
1991	S	8	Chris Hynnes	Canada	D	—	—	—	—	—	—	—	—	—	—
1992	1	4	Todd Warriner	Canada	LW	453	65	89	154	249	—	—	—	—	—
1992	2	28	Paul Brousseau	Canada	RW	26	1	3	4	29	—	—	—	—	—
1992	2	29	Tuomas Gronman	Finland	D	38	1	3	4	38	—	—	—	—	—
1992	3	52	Manny Fernandez	Canada	G	325	0	6	6	40	143	123	24	11	2.50
1992	4	76	Ian McIntyre	Canada	LW	—	—	—	—	—	—	—	—	—	—
1992	5	100	Charles Wasley	United States	D	—	—	—	—	—	—	—	—	—	—
1992	6	124	Paxton Schulte#	Canada	LW	2	0	0	0	4	—	—	—	—	—
1992	7	148	Martin LePage	Canada	D	—	—	—	—	—	—	—	—	—	—
1992	8	172	Mike Jickling	Canada	C	—	—	—	—	—	—	—	—	—	—
1992	9	196	Steve Passmore	Canada	G	93	0	2	2	21	23	44	12	—	2.79
1992	10	220	Anson Carter	Canada	C	674	202	219	421	229	—	—	—	—	—
1992	11	244	Aaron Ellis	United States	G	—	—	—	—	—	—	—	—	—	—
1992	S	4	Richard Shulmistra	Canada	G	2	0	0	0	0	1	1	0	—	1.48
1993	1	10	Jocelyn Thibault#	Canada	G	586	0	6	6	18	238	238	68	7	2.75
1993	1	14	Adam Deadmarsh#	United States	RW	567	184	189	373	819	—	—	—	—	—
1993	2	49	Ashley Buckberger	Canada	RW	—	—	—	—	—	—	—	—	—	—
1993	3	75	Billy Pierce	United States	F	—	—	—	—	—	—	—	—	—	—
1993	4	101	Ryan Tocher	Canada	D	—	—	—	—	—	—	—	—	—	—
1993	5	127	Anders Myrvold	Norway	D	33	0	5	5	12	—	—	—	—	—
1993	6	137	Nick Checco	United States	LW	—	—	—	—	—	—	—	—	—	—
1993	6	153	Christian Matte	Canada	RW	25	2	3	5	12	—	—	—	—	—
1993	7	179	David Ling	Canada	W	93	4	4	8	191	—	—	—	—	—
1993	8	205	Petr Franek	Czech Republic	G	—	—	—	—	—	—	—	—	—	—
1993	9	231	Vincent Auger	Canada	F	—	—	—	—	—	—	—	—	—	—
1993	10	257	Mark Pivetz	Canada	D	—	—	—	—	—	—	—	—	—	—
1993	11	283	John Hillman	United States	F	—	—	—	—	—	—	—	—	—	—
1994	1	12	Wade Belak	Canada	F/D	549	8	25	32	1263	—	—	—	—	—
1994	1	22	Jeff Kealty	United States	D	—	—	—	—	—	—	—	—	—	—
1994	2	35	Josef Marha	Czech Republic	C	159	21	32	53	32	—	—	—	—	—
1994	3	61	Sebastien Bety	Canada	D	—	—	—	—	—	—	—	—	—	—
1994	3	72	Chris Drury	United States	C	892	255	360	615	468	—	—	—	—	—
1994	4	87	Milan Hejduk	Czech Republic	RW	1020	375	430	805	316	—	—	—	—	—
1994	5	113	Tony Tuzzolino	United States	C	9	0	0	0	7	—	—	—	—	—
1994	6	139	Nicholas Windsor	United States	D	—	—	—	—	—	—	—	—	—	—
1994	7	165	Calvin Elfring	Canada	D	—	—	—	—	—	—	—	—	—	—
1994	8	191	Jay Bertsch	Canada	D	—	—	—	—	—	—	—	—	—	—
1994	9	217	Tim Thomas	United States	G	426	0	7	7	43	214	145	0	49	2.52
1994	10	243	Chris Pittman	Canada	C	—	—	—	—	—	—	—	—	—	—
1994	11	285	Steven Low	Canada	D	—	—	—	—	—	—	—	—	—	—
1994	S	9	Reid Simonton	Canada	D	—	—	—	—	—	—	—	—	—	—

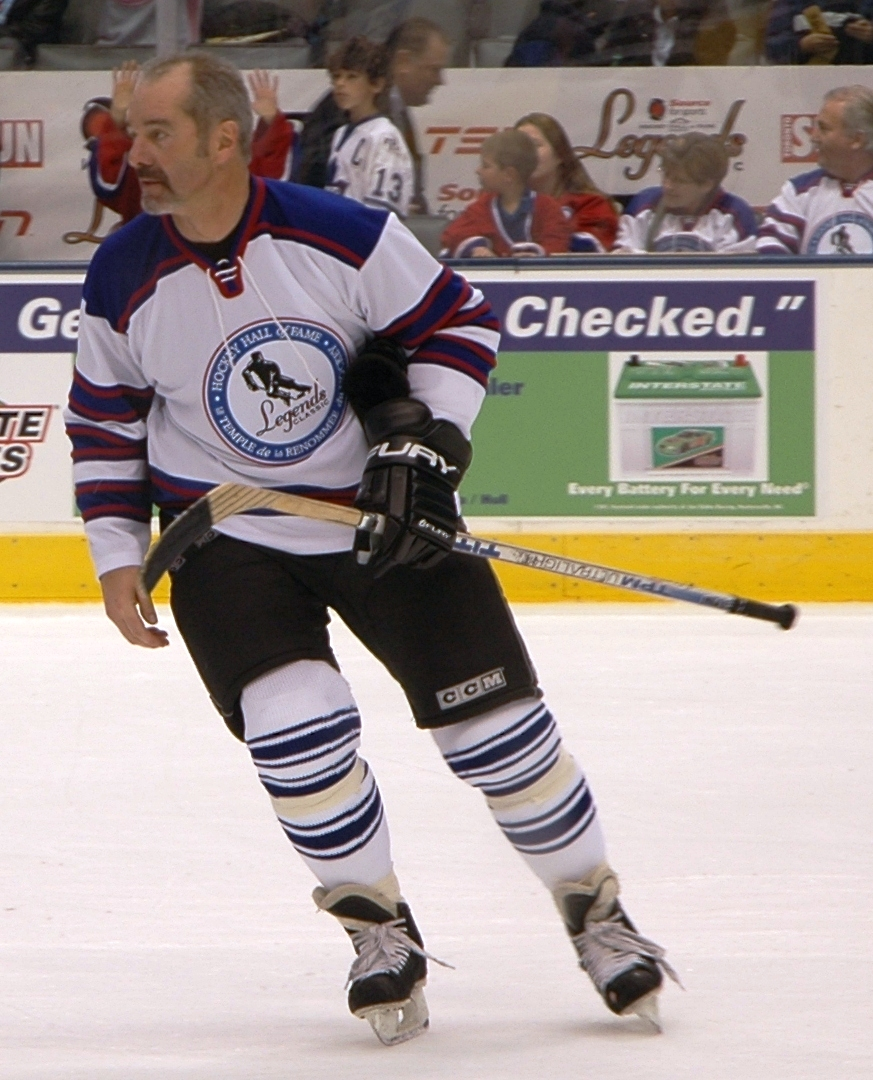
The Nordiques selected Michel Goulet 20th overall in the 1979 NHL entry draft.

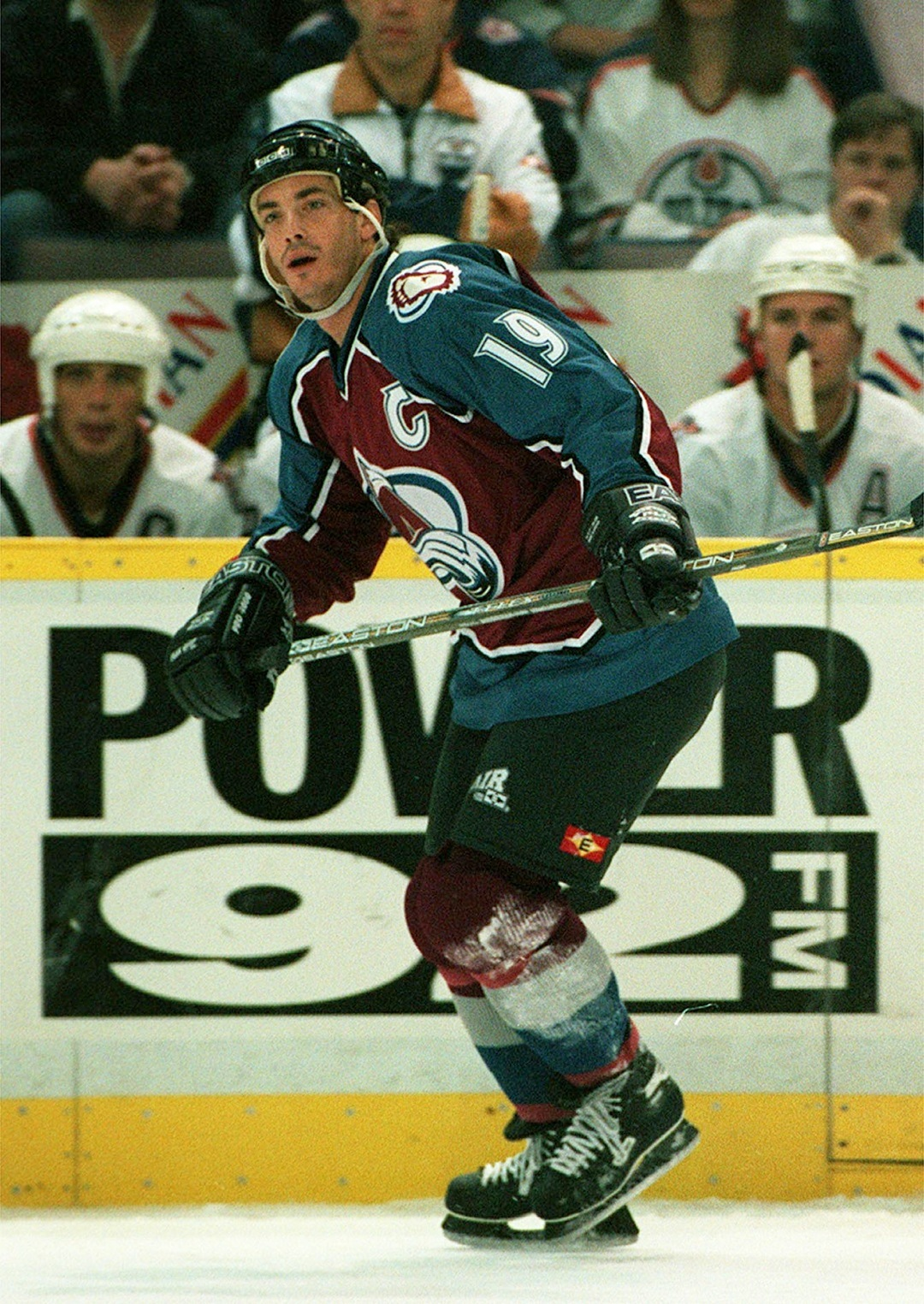
The Nordiques selected Joe Sakic 15th overall in the 1987 NHL entry draft.

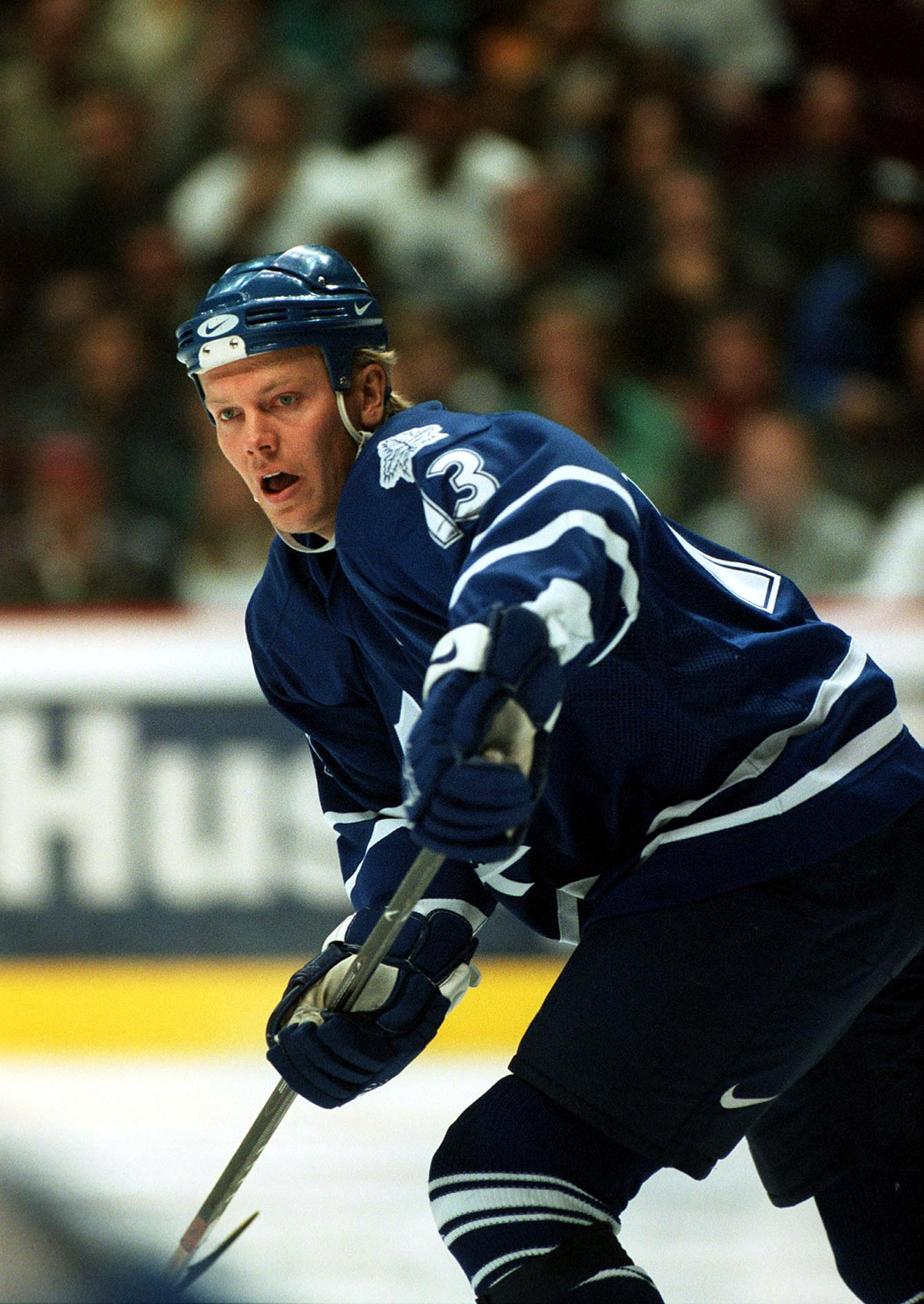
The Nordiques selected Mats Sundin 1st overall in the 1989 NHL entry draft.

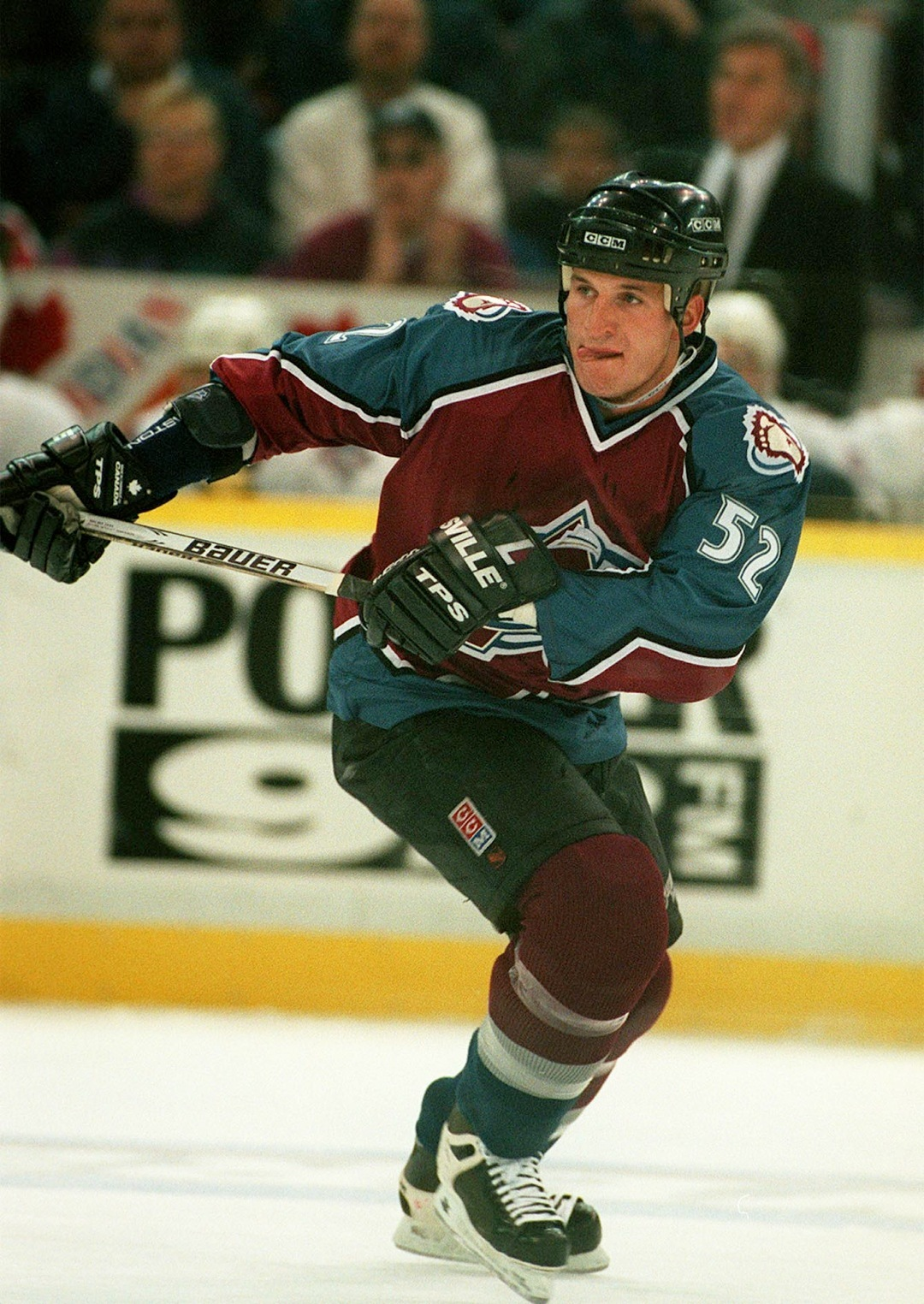
The Nordiques selected Adam Foote 22nd overall in the 1989 NHL Entry Draft.

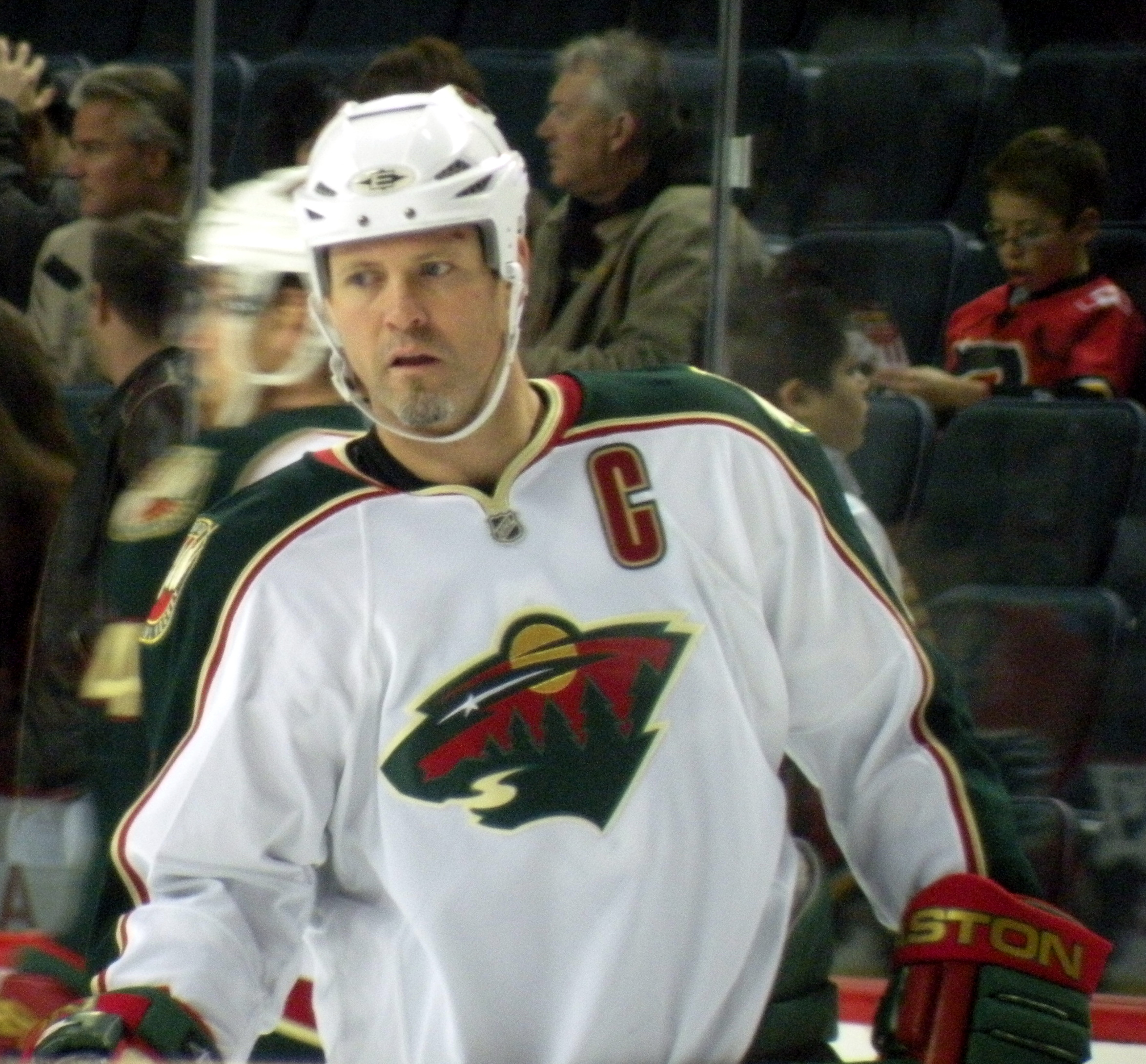
The Nordiques selected Owen Nolan 1st overall in the 1990 NHL entry draft.

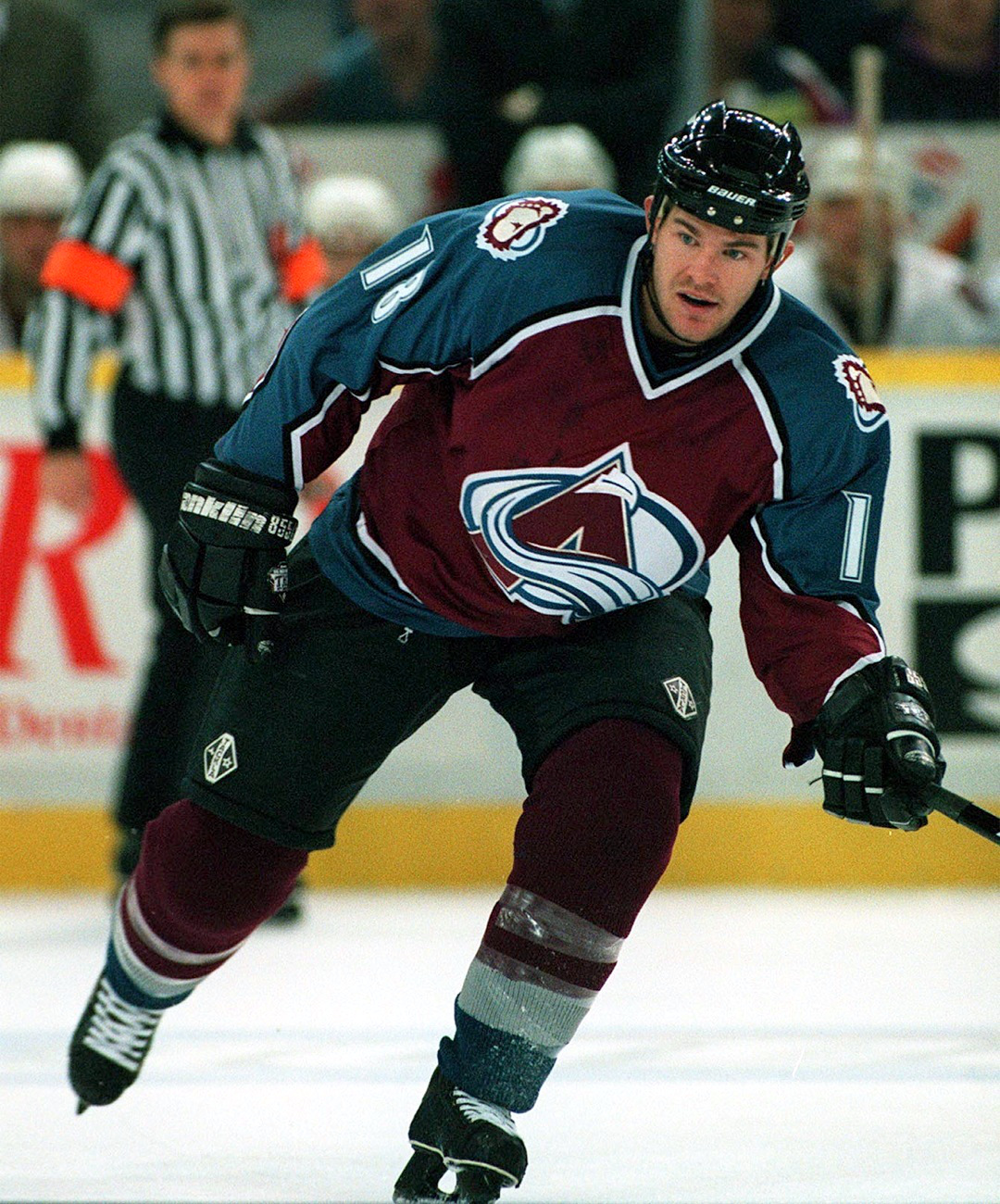
The Nordiques selected Adam Deadmarsh 14th overall in the 1993 NHL entry draft.

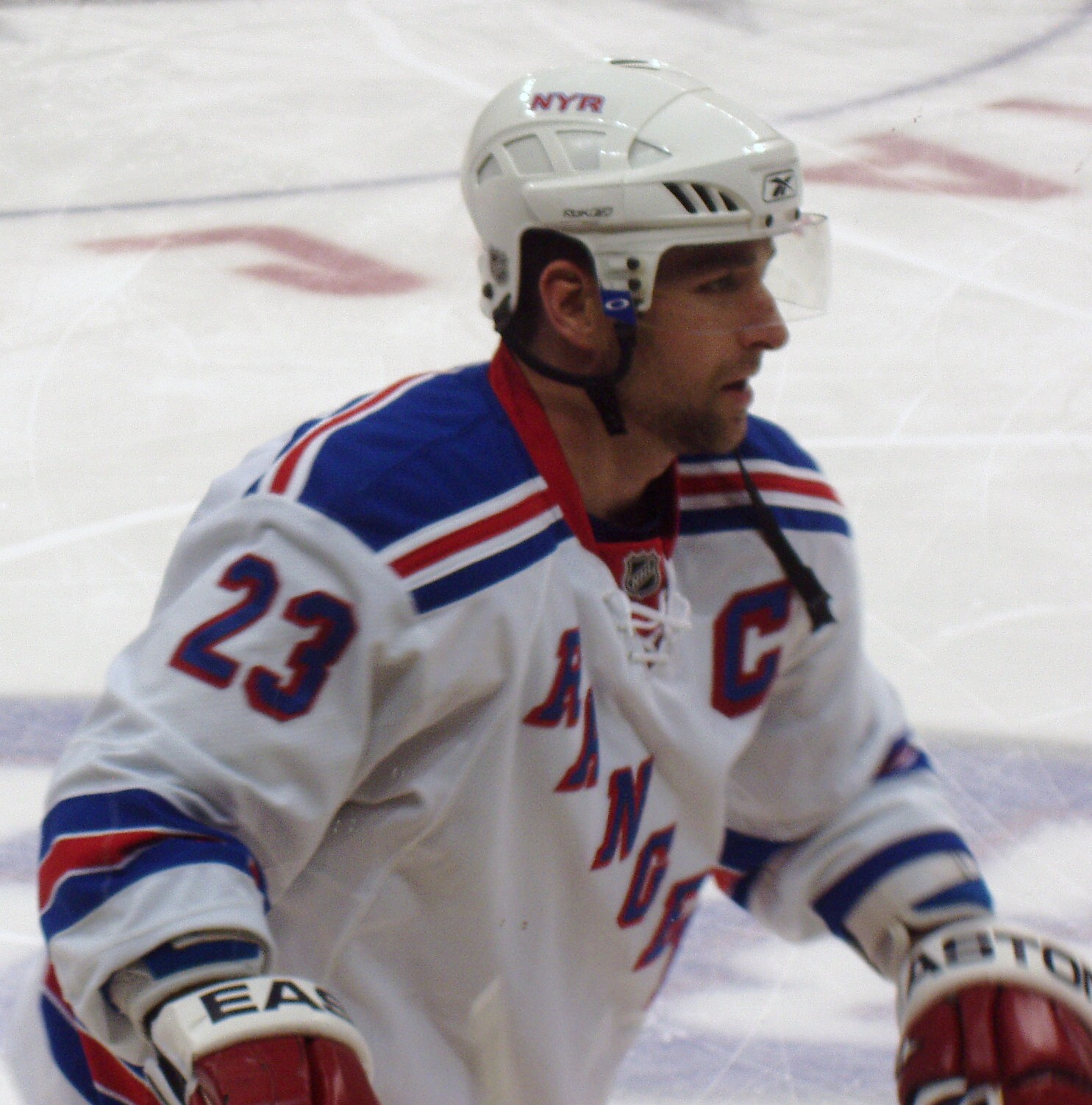
The Nordiques selected Chris Drury 72nd overall in the 1994 NHL entry draft.

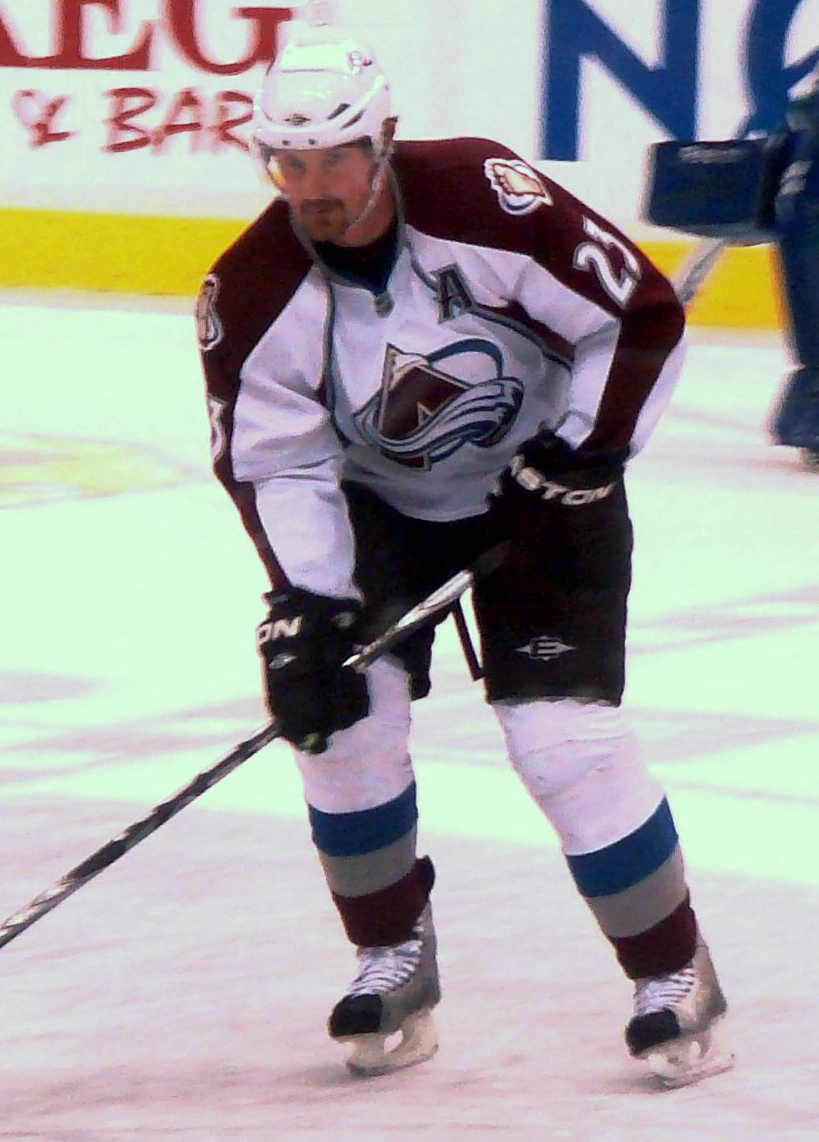
The Nordiques selected Milan Hejduk 87th overall in the 1994 NHL Entry Draft.

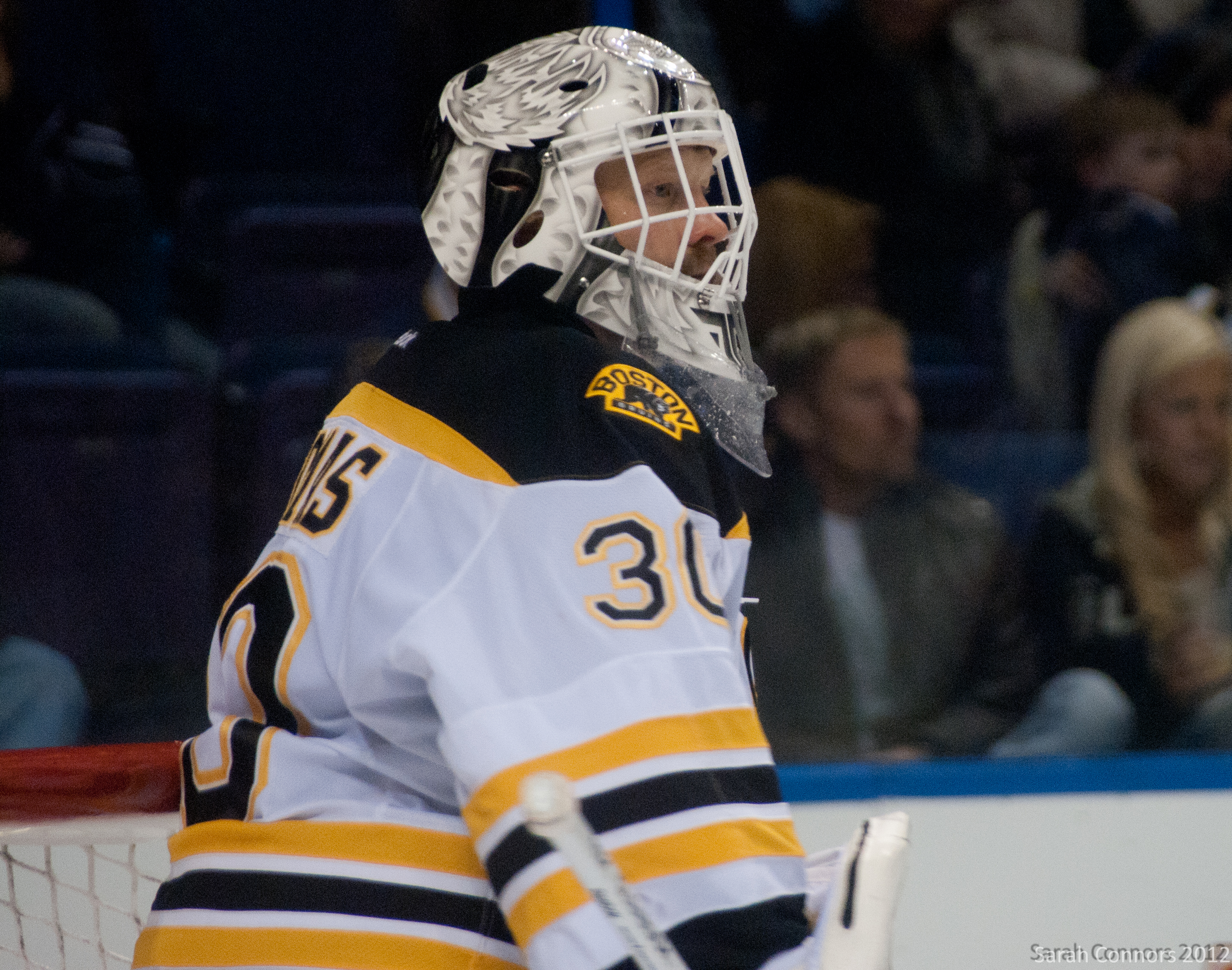
The Nordiques selected Tim Thomas 217th overall in the 1994 NHL Entry Draft.

== See also ==
- List of Quebec Nordiques players
- 1979 NHL Expansion Draft
- List of Colorado Avalanche draft picks
