= Jeff Kealty =

American ice hockey player (born 1976)

- Born: April 9, 1976 (age 50) Newton, Massachusetts, U.S.
- Height: 6 ft 4 in (193 cm)
- Weight: 210 lb (95 kg; 15 st 0 lb)
- Position: Defense
- Shot: Left
- Played for: Milwaukee Admirals (IHL)
- NHL draft: 22nd overall, 1994; Quebec Nordiques
- Playing career: 1998–2000

Jeff Kealty (born April 9, 1976) is an American former professional ice hockey defenseman and current assistant general manager of the San Jose Sharks of the National Hockey League (NHL). He was drafted in the first round, 22nd overall, by the Quebec Nordiques in the 1994 NHL entry draft. However, he never played in the National Hockey League, retiring after playing just 71 games with the Milwaukee Admirals of the International Hockey League.

After retiring from playing, Kealty became a scout for the Nashville Predators organization. On July 25, 2007, Kealty was named the team's chief Amateur Scout. On December 1, 2017, Nashville Predators president of hockey operations and general manager David Poile announced that Kealty had been promoted to director of player personnel, assisting Poile on all player personnel decisions, in addition to the duties he was already responsible for as chief amateur scout. On July 17, 2026, Kealty left the Nashville Predators and joined the San Jose Sharks as an assistant general manager, overseeing the team's scouting staff and working with General Manager Mike Grier on all aspects of hockey operations.

== Career statistics ==
=== Regular season and playoffs ===
			Regular season					Playoffs
Season	Team	League	GP	G	A	Pts	PIM	GP	G	A	Pts	PIM
1992–93	Catholic Memorial School	HS-MA
1993–94	Catholic Memorial School	HS-MA
1994–95	Boston University	HE	25	0	5	5	29	—	—	—	—	—
1995–96	Boston University	HE	34	4	15	19	38	—	—	—	—	—
1996–97	Boston University	HE	40	4	9	13	42	—	—	—	—	—
1997–98	Boston University	HE	38	11	15	26	53	—	—	—	—	—
1998–99	Milwaukee Admirals	IHL	70	8	14	22	134	2	0	1	1	4
1999–2000	Milwaukee Admirals	IHL	1	0	0	0	2	—	—	—	—	—
HE totals			137	19	44	63	162	—	—	—	—	—
IHL totals			71	8	14	22	136	2	0	1	1	4

=== International ===
Year	Team	Event	GP	G	A	Pts	PIM
1996	United States	WJC	6	0	1	1	6

Preceded by Wade Belak	Quebec Nordiques first-round draft pick 1994	Succeeded by Marc Denis
