= 1998 Stanley Cup playoffs =

Playoffs with the Detroit Red Wings winning against the Washington Capitals

Tournament details
- Dates: April 22–June 16, 1998
- Teams: 16
- Defending champions: Detroit Red Wings

Final positions
- Champions: Detroit Red Wings
- Runners-up: Washington Capitals

Tournament statistics
- Scoring leader(s): Steve Yzerman (Red Wings) (24 points)

Awards
- MVP: Steve Yzerman (Red Wings)

The 1998 Stanley Cup playoffs, the playoff tournament of the National Hockey League (NHL), began on April 22, 1998 following the 1997–98 regular season. The sixteen teams that qualified, eight from each conference, played best-of-7 series for conference quarterfinals, semifinals and championships, and then the conference champions played a best-of-7 series for the Stanley Cup.

The playoffs concluded on June 16 with the Detroit Red Wings defeating the Washington Capitals in a four-game sweep to win their second Stanley Cup championship in a row. Red Wings captain Steve Yzerman was named playoff MVP, and awarded the Conn Smythe Trophy. The 1997–98 Detroit Red Wings were the last team to defend their Stanley Cup title until the Pittsburgh Penguins successfully defended their Stanley Cup title in 2017.

In the Eastern Semis, the Buffalo Sabres made history as they became the first team in NHL history to complete a four-game sweep of the Montreal Canadiens on Montreal ice.

For the first time since 1969, the Chicago Blackhawks missed the playoffs, ending the second-longest active playoff appearance streak in NHL history at 28 seasons. The longest active appearanced streak moved to the St. Louis Blues at 19 consecutive seasons. Also, both the Islanders and Rangers missed the playoffs in the same season for the first time.

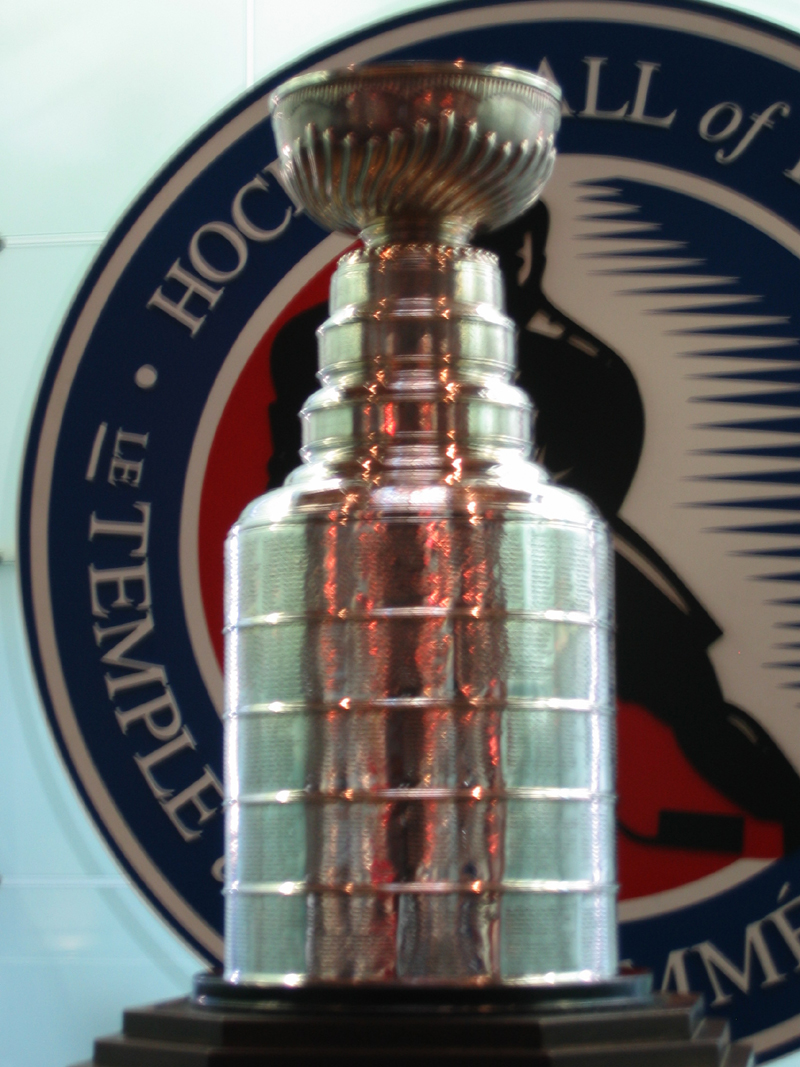
The Stanley Cup, awarded to the champion of the NHL.

== Playoff seeds ==
The top eight teams in each conference qualified for the playoffs. The top two seeds in each conference were awarded to the division winners; while the six remaining spots were awarded to the highest finishers in their respective conferences.

The following teams qualified for the playoffs:

=== Eastern Conference ===
1. New Jersey Devils, Atlantic Division champions, Eastern Conference regular season champions – 107 points
2. Pittsburgh Penguins, Northeast Division champions – 98 points
3. Philadelphia Flyers – 95 points
4. Washington Capitals – 92 points
5. Boston Bruins – 91 points
6. Buffalo Sabres – 89 points
7. Montreal Canadiens – 87 points
8. Ottawa Senators – 83 points

=== Western Conference ===
1. Dallas Stars, Central Division champions, Western Conference regular season champions, Presidents' Trophy winners – 109 points
2. Colorado Avalanche, Pacific Division champions – 95 points
3. Detroit Red Wings – 103 points
4. St. Louis Blues – 98 points
5. Los Angeles Kings – 87 points
6. Phoenix Coyotes – 82 points
7. Edmonton Oilers – 80 points
8. San Jose Sharks – 78 points

== Playoff bracket ==
In each round, teams competed in a best-of-seven series, following a 2–2–1–1–1 format (scores in the bracket indicate the number of games won in each best-of-seven series). The team with home ice advantage played at home for games one and two (and games five and seven, if necessary), and the other team played at home for games three and four (and game six, if necessary). For any series played between Central and Pacific Division teams, the team with home ice advantage had the option of using a 2–3–2 format to reduce travel, with the sites for games five and six switched; if the 2–3–2 format was chosen, the team with home ice advantage then had the additional option to start the series on the road instead of at home. The top eight teams in each conference made the playoffs, with the two division winners seeded 1–2 based on regular season record, and the six remaining teams seeded 3–8.

The NHL used "re-seeding" instead of a fixed bracket playoff system. During the first three rounds, the highest remaining seed in each conference was matched against the lowest remaining seed, the second-highest remaining seed played the second-lowest remaining seed, and so forth. The higher-seeded team was awarded home ice advantage. The two conference winners then advanced to the Stanley Cup Finals, where home ice advantage was awarded to the team that had the better regular season record.

Conference quarterfinals | Conference semifinals
1 | New Jersey | 2
8 | Ottawa | 4
4 | Washington | 4
8 | Ottawa | 1
2 | Pittsburgh | 2
7 | Montreal | 4
Eastern Conference
3 | Philadelphia | 1
6 | Buffalo | 4
6 | Buffalo | 4
7 | Montreal | 0
4 | Washington | 4
5 | Boston | 2
1 | Dallas | 4
8 | San Jose | 2
1 | Dallas | 4
7 | Edmonton | 1
2 | Colorado | 3
7 | Edmonton | 4
Western Conference
3 | Detroit | 4
6 | Phoenix | 2
3 | Detroit | 4
4 | St. Louis | 2
4 | St. Louis | 4
5 | Los Angeles | 0

Conference finals
4 | Washington | 4
6 | Buffalo | 2
1 | Dallas | 2
3 | Detroit | 4

Stanley Cup Finals
E4 | Washington | 0
W3 | Detroit | 4

== Conference quarterfinals ==
=== Eastern Conference quarterfinals ===
==== (1) New Jersey Devils vs. (8) Ottawa Senators ====
This was the first playoff meeting between these two teams.

| April 22 | Ottawa Senators | 2–1 | OT | New Jersey Devils | Continental Airlines Arena | Recap |
| No scoring | | First period | | No scoring |
| Alexei Yashin (1) – 18:48 | | Second period | | No scoring |
| No scoring | | Third period | | 16:36 – Doug Gilmour (1) |
| Bruce Gardiner (1) – 05:58 | | First overtime period | | No scoring |
| Damian Rhodes 28 saves / 29 shots | | Goalie stats | | Martin Brodeur 30 saves / 32 shots |

| April 24 | Ottawa Senators | 1–3 | New Jersey Devils | Continental Airlines Arena | Recap |
| Chris Murray (1) – 03:38 | | First period | 09:19 – pp – Dave Andreychuk (1) |
| No scoring | | Second period | 18:58 – Doug Gilmour (2) |
| No scoring | | Third period | 19:19 – en – Doug Gilmour (3) |
| Damian Rhodes 29 saves / 31 shots | | Goalie stats | Martin Brodeur 27 saves / 28 shots |

| April 26 | New Jersey Devils | 1–2 | OT | Ottawa Senators | Corel Centre | Recap |
| No scoring | | First period | | No scoring |
| Bobby Carpenter (1) – 00:36 | | Second period | | 04:56 – pp – Janne Laukkanen (1) |
| No scoring | | Third period | | No scoring |
| No scoring | | First overtime period | | 02:47 – pp – Alexei Yashin (2) |
| Martin Brodeur 21 saves / 23 shots | | Goalie stats | | Damian Rhodes 30 saves / 31 shots |

| April 28 | New Jersey Devils | 3–4 | Ottawa Senators | Corel Centre | Recap |
| Denis Pederson (1) – sh – 06:33 | | First period | 16:20 – Daniel Alfredsson (1) |
| No scoring | | Second period | 06:50 – Daniel Alfredsson (2); 16:24 – pp – Jason York (1) |
| Scott Stevens (1) – 14:04; Doug Gilmour (4) – pp – 18:41 | | Third period | 05:00 – Daniel Alfredsson (3) |
| Martin Brodeur 24 saves / 28 shots | | Goalie stats | Damian Rhodes 31 saves / 34 shots |

| April 30 | Ottawa Senators | 1–3 | New Jersey Devils | Continental Airlines Arena | Recap |
| No scoring | | First period | 11:04 – sh – Brian Rolston (1) |
| No scoring | | Second period | 08:33 – pp – Lyle Odelein (1) |
| Igor Kravchuk (1) – 10:38 | | Third period | 11:52 – Doug Gilmour (5) |
| Damian Rhodes 23 saves / 26 shots | | Goalie stats | Martin Brodeur 22 saves / 23 shots |

| May 2 | New Jersey Devils | 1–3 | Ottawa Senators | Corel Centre | Recap |
| No scoring | | First period | 08:28 – pp – Alexei Yashin (3) |
| Kevin Dean (1) – 05:24 | | Second period | 10:30 – Janne Laukkanen (2) |
| No scoring | | Third period | 19:10 – en – Igor Kravchuk (2) |
| Martin Brodeur 28 saves / 30 shots | | Goalie stats | Damian Rhodes 21 saves / 22 shots |

| Ottawa won series 4–2 |

==== (2) Pittsburgh Penguins vs. (7) Montreal Canadiens ====
This was the first playoff meeting between these two teams.

| April 23 | Montreal Canadiens | 3–2 | OT | Pittsburgh Penguins | Civic Arena | Recap |
| Martin Rucinsky (1) – pp – 12:15 | | First period | | No scoring |
| Peter Popovic (1) – 16:44 | | Second period | | 07:21 – sh – Brad Werenka (1) |
| No scoring | | Third period | | 18:22 – Stu Barnes (1) |
| Benoit Brunet (1) – 18:43 | | First overtime period | | No scoring |
| Andy Moog 34 saves / 36 shots | | Goalie stats | | Tom Barrasso 37 saves / 40 shots |

| April 25 | Montreal Canadiens | 1–4 | Pittsburgh Penguins | Civic Arena | Recap |
| Vincent Damphousse (1) – pp – 18:29 | | First period | 11:13 – pp – Eddie Olczyk (1) |
| No scoring | | Second period | 10:42 – Stu Barnes (2) |
| No scoring | | Third period | 01:12 – Stu Barnes (3); 19:03 – en – Ron Francis (1) |
| Andy Moog 24 saves / 27 shots | | Goalie stats | Tom Barrasso 27 saves / 28 shots |

| April 27 | Pittsburgh Penguins | 1–3 | Montreal Canadiens | Molson Centre | Recap |
| Jaromir Jagr (1) – 17:10 | | First period | 05:33 – Martin Rucinsky (2) |
| No scoring | | Second period | 04:47 – pp – Shayne Corson (1) |
| No scoring | | Third period | 09:56 – Shayne Corson (2) |
| Tom Barrasso 19 saves / 22 shots | | Goalie stats | Andy Moog 19 saves / 20 shots |

| April 29 | Pittsburgh Penguins | 6–3 | Montreal Canadiens | Molson Centre | Recap |
| Rob Brown (1) – pp – 03:19; Kevin Hatcher (1) – pp – 04:43; Jaromir Jagr (2) – pp – 16:53; Eddie Olczyk (2) – sh – 19:25 | | First period | 06:25 – pp – Vladimir Malakhov (1) |
| Martin Straka (1) – sh – 02:59 | | Second period | No scoring |
| Jaromir Jagr (3) – en – 19:48 | | Third period | 01:48 – Marc Bureau (1); 17:30 – Jonas Hoglund (1) |
| Tom Barrasso 27 saves / 30 shots | | Goalie stats | Andy Moog 4 saves / 9 shots Jose Theodore 10 saves / 10 shots |

| May 1 | Montreal Canadiens | 5–2 | Pittsburgh Penguins | Civic Arena | Recap |
| No scoring | | First period | No scoring |
| Patrice Brisebois (1) – 10:33; Shayne Corson (3) – 12:02 | | Second period | No scoring |
| Mark Recchi (1) – 01:01; Vincent Damphousse (2) – 18:53; Mark Recchi (2) – en – 19:19 | | Third period | 05:45 – Martin Straka (2); 13:30 – Jaromir Jagr (4) |
| Andy Moog 32 saves / 34 shots | | Goalie stats | Tom Barrasso 24 saves / 28 shots |

| May 3 | Pittsburgh Penguins | 0–3 | Montreal Canadiens | Molson Centre | Recap |
| No scoring | | First period | No scoring |
| No scoring | | Second period | 09:27 – Mark Recchi (3); 14:36 – Jonas Hoglund (2) |
| No scoring | | Third period | 06:52 – pp – Saku Koivu (1) |
| Tom Barrasso 20 saves / 23 shots | | Goalie stats | Andy Moog 21 saves / 21 shots |

| Montreal won series 4–2 |

==== (3) Philadelphia Flyers vs. (6) Buffalo Sabres ====
This was the second consecutive and fifth overall playoff meeting between these two teams; with Philadelphia winning all four previous series. Philadelphia won last year's Eastern Conference Semifinals in five games.

| April 22 | Buffalo Sabres | 3–2 | Philadelphia Flyers | CoreStates Center | Recap |
| Michal Grosek (1) – 16:50 | | First period | No scoring |
| Wayne Primeau (1) – 18:18 | | Second period | No scoring |
| Donald Audette (1) – 11:43 | | Third period | 08:29 – Rod Brind'Amour (1); 08:48 – Chris Gratton (1) |
| Dominik Hasek 22 saves / 24 shots | | Goalie stats | Sean Burke 22 saves / 25 shots |

| April 24 | Buffalo Sabres | 2–3 | Philadelphia Flyers | CoreStates Center | Recap |
| No scoring | | First period | 05:24 – Eric Lindros (1) |
| No scoring | | Second period | 04:07 – Chris Gratton (2) |
| Michal Grosek (2) – pp – 02:33; Dixon Ward (1) – 09:22 | | Third period | 16:28 – pp – John LeClair (1) |
| Dominik Hasek 35 saves / 38 shots | | Goalie stats | Sean Burke 25 saves / 27 shots |

| April 27 | Philadelphia Flyers | 1–6 | Buffalo Sabres | Marine Midland Arena | Recap |
| No scoring | | First period | 02:20 – pp – Miroslav Satan (1) |
| No scoring | | Second period | 09:37 – Michal Grosek (3); 11:29 – pp – Miroslav Satan (2); 14:20 – sh – Darryl Shannon (1); 15:05 – sh – Brian Holzinger (1) |
| Dan McGillis (1) – pp – 13:51 | | Third period | 19:23 – Vaclav Varada (1) |
| Sean Burke 15 saves / 20 shots Ron Hextall 7 saves / 8 shots | | Goalie stats | Dominik Hasek 31 saves / 32 shots |

| April 29 | Philadelphia Flyers | 1–4 | Buffalo Sabres | Marine Midland Arena | Recap |
| No scoring | | First period | 17:37 – Dixon Ward (2); 19:05 – pp – Miroslav Satan (3) |
| No scoring | | Second period | 01:38 – pp – Matthew Barnaby (1); 05:16 – pp – Brian Holzinger (2) |
| Rod Brind'Amour (2) – pp – 05:16 | | Third period | No scoring |
| Sean Burke 16 saves / 20 shots | | Goalie stats | Dominik Hasek 44 saves / 45 shots |

| May 1 | Buffalo Sabres | 3–2 | OT | Philadelphia Flyers | CoreStates Center | Recap |
| Jason Woolley (1) – pp – 02:29 | | First period | | No scoring |
| No scoring | | Second period | | 01:49 – Mike Sillinger (1) |
| Donald Audette (2) – pp – 08:26 | | Third period | | 13:08 – pp – Dave Babych (1) |
| Michal Grosek (4) – pp – 05:40 | | First overtime period | | No scoring |
| Dominik Hasek 35 saves / 37 shots | | Goalie stats | | Sean Burke 26 saves / 29 shots |

| Buffalo won series 4–1 |

==== (4) Washington Capitals vs. (5) Boston Bruins ====
This was the second playoff meeting between these two teams. Their only previous meeting was in the 1990 Wales Conference Final, where Boston won in a four-game sweep.

| April 22 | Boston Bruins | 1–3 | Washington Capitals | MCI Center | Recap |
| No scoring | | First period | 16:40 – Brian Bellows (1) |
| Dmitri Khristich (1) – pp – 06:53 | | Second period | 02:49 – Sergei Gonchar (1) |
| No scoring | | Third period | 19:38 – en – Esa Tikkanen (1) |
| Byron Dafoe 25 saves / 27 shots | | Goalie stats | Olaf Kolzig 27 saves / 28 shots |

| April 24 | Boston Bruins | 4–3 | 2OT | Washington Capitals | MCI Center | Recap |
| No scoring | | First period | | 04:45 – pp – Esa Tikkanen (2) |
| No scoring | | Second period | | 03:24 – Calle Johansson (1) |
| Jason Allison (1) – 00:54; P. J. Axelsson (1) – 06:10; Darren Van Impe (1) – pp – 17:03 | | Third period | | 19:23 – Sergei Gonchar (2) |
| Darren Van Impe (2) – 00:54 | | Second overtime period | | No scoring |
| Byron Dafoe 25 saves / 28 shots | | Goalie stats | | Olaf Kolzig 36 saves / 40 shots |

| April 26 | Washington Capitals | 3–2 | 2OT | Boston Bruins | Fleet Center | Recap |
| Sergei Gonchar (3) – pp – 18:30 | | First period | | No scoring |
| Sergei Gonchar (4) – 14:15 | | Second period | | 19:00 – pp – Kyle McLaren (1) |
| No scoring | | Third period | | 10:59 – pp – Dmitri Khristich (2) |
| Joe Juneau (1) – 06:31 | | Second overtime period | | No scoring |
| Olaf Kolzig 52 saves / 54 shots | | Goalie stats | | Byron Dafoe 24 saves / 27 shots |

| April 28 | Washington Capitals | 3–0 | Boston Bruins | Fleet Center | Recap |
| Adam Oates (1) – 16:10 | | First period | No scoring |
| Adam Oates (2) – pp – 02:42 | | Second period | No scoring |
| Ken Klee (1) – 09:14 | | Third period | No scoring |
| Olaf Kolzig 38 saves / 38 shots | | Goalie stats | Byron Dafoe 15 saves / 18 shots |

| May 1 | Boston Bruins | 4–0 | Washington Capitals | MCI Center | Recap |
| No scoring | | First period | No scoring |
| Sergei Samsonov (1) – 02:20; Jason Allison (2) – pp – 08:54; Rob DiMaio (1) – 18:00 | | Second period | No scoring |
| Ray Bourque (1) – pp – 15:10 | | Third period | No scoring |
| Byron Dafoe 26 saves / 26 shots | | Goalie stats | Olaf Kolzig 26 saves / 30 shots |

| May 3 | Washington Capitals | 3–2 | OT | Boston Bruins | Fleet Center | Recap |
| Richard Zednik (1) – 06:54 | | First period | | No scoring |
| Adam Oates (3) – 06:04 | | Second period | | 05:26 – Sergei Samsonov (2) |
| No scoring | | Third period | | 09:13 – Anson Carter (1) |
| Brian Bellows (2) – 15:24 | | First overtime period | | No scoring |
| Olaf Kolzig 47 saves / 49 shots | | Goalie stats | | Byron Dafoe 30 saves / 33 shots |

| Washington won series 4–2 |

=== Western Conference quarterfinals ===
==== (1) Dallas Stars vs. (8) San Jose Sharks ====
This was the first playoff meeting between these two teams.

| April 22 | San Jose Sharks | 1–4 | Dallas Stars | Reunion Arena | Recap |
| Owen Nolan (1) – pp – 12:40 | | First period | 02:22 – Joe Nieuwendyk (1); 02:59 – Juha Lind (1) |
| No scoring | | Second period | 03:30 – pp – Derian Hatcher (1) |
| No scoring | | Third period | 19:58 – en – Mike Modano (1) |
| Mike Vernon 27 saves / 30 shots | | Goalie stats | Ed Belfour 21 saves / 22 shots |

| April 24 | San Jose Sharks | 2–5 | Dallas Stars | Reunion Arena | Recap |
| No scoring | | First period | 01:25 – pp – Jere Lehtinen (1); 19:31 – Derian Hatcher (2) |
| No scoring | | Second period | 16:29 – pp – Pat Verbeek (1); 18:26 – pp – Benoit Hogue (1) |
| Bill Houlder (1) – 07:46; Murray Craven (1) – 19:02 | | Third period | 17:05 – pp – Pat Verbeek (2) |
| Mike Vernon 10 saves / 14 shots Kelly Hrudey 5 saves / 6 shots | | Goalie stats | Ed Belfour 18 saves / 20 shots |

| April 26 | Dallas Stars | 1–4 | San Jose Sharks | San Jose Arena | Recap |
| Sergei Zubov (1) – pp – 04:16 | | First period | No scoring |
| No scoring | | Second period | 05:06 – John MacLean (1); 06:13 – pp – Owen Nolan (2) |
| No scoring | | Third period | 01:04 – pp – Al Iafrate (1); 16:55 – pp – Mike Rathje (1) |
| Ed Belfour 21 saves / 25 shots | | Goalie stats | Mike Vernon 13 saves / 14 shots |

| April 28 | Dallas Stars | 0–1 | OT | San Jose Sharks | San Jose Arena | Recap |
| No scoring | | First period | | No scoring |
| No scoring | | Second period | | No scoring |
| No scoring | | Third period | | No scoring |
| No scoring | | First overtime period | | 06:31 – Andrei Zyuzin (1) |
| Ed Belfour 22 saves / 23 shots | | Goalie stats | | Mike Vernon 26 saves / 26 shots |

| April 30 | San Jose Sharks | 2–3 | Dallas Stars | Reunion Arena | Recap |
| No scoring | | First period | 19:57 – pp – Mike Modano (2) |
| John MacLean (2) – pp – 11:26; Ron Sutter (1) – 11:34 | | Second period | 16:29 – Juha Lind (2) |
| No scoring | | Third period | 11:08 – Mike Modano (3) |
| Mike Vernon 23 saves / 26 shots | | Goalie stats | Ed Belfour 18 saves / 20 shots |

| May 2 | Dallas Stars | 3–2 | OT | San Jose Sharks | San Jose Arena | Recap |
| No scoring | | First period | | 16:25 – pp – Joe Murphy (1) |
| Richard Matvichuk (1) – 10:59; Mike Keane (1) – sh – 16:04 | | Second period | | 07:51 – Mike Ricci (1) |
| No scoring | | Third period | | No scoring |
| Mike Keane (2) – 03:43 | | First overtime period | | No scoring |
| Ed Belfour 19 saves / 21 shots | | Goalie stats | | Mike Vernon 25 saves / 28 shots |

| Dallas won series 4–2 |

==== (2) Colorado Avalanche vs. (7) Edmonton Oilers ====
This was the second consecutive playoff meeting and second postseason match-up between these two teams. Colorado won last year's Western Conference Semifinals in five games.

| April 22 | Edmonton Oilers | 3–2 | Colorado Avalanche | McNichols Sports Arena | Recap |
| No scoring | | First period | No scoring |
| No scoring | | Second period | 15:31 – pp – Peter Forsberg (1) |
| Bill Guerin (1) – pp – 11:02; Dean McAmmond (1) – 12:22; Boris Mironov (1) – 14:51 | | Third period | 00:17 – Peter Forsberg (2) |
| Curtis Joseph 25 saves / 27 shots | | Goalie stats | Patrick Roy 31 saves / 34 shots |

| April 24 | Edmonton Oilers | 2–5 | Colorado Avalanche | McNichols Sports Arena | Recap |
| No scoring | | First period | 01:22 – pp – Valeri Kamensky (1); 02:54 – Peter Forsberg (3) |
| Bill Guerin (2) – pp – 10:53 | | Second period | 11:28 – sh – Joe Sakic (1); 13:23 – pp – Peter Forsberg (4) |
| Bill Guerin (3) – pp – 15:27 | | Third period | 00:30 – Valeri Kamensky (2) |
| Curtis Joseph 17 saves / 21 shots Bob Essensa 10 saves / 11 shots | | Goalie stats | Patrick Roy 25 saves / 27 shots |

| April 26 | Colorado Avalanche | 5–4 | OT | Edmonton Oilers | Edmonton Coliseum | Recap |
| Adam Deadmarsh (1) – 03:50; Claude Lemieux (1) – pp – 14:19 | | First period | | No scoring |
| Adam Deadmarsh (2) – pp – 09:51 | | Second period | | 06:50 – Boris Mironov (2); 16:44 – pp – Doug Weight (1) |
| Claude Lemieux (2) – 02:14 | | Third period | | 11:11 – Bill Guerin (4); 12:32 – Kelly Buchberger (1) |
| Joe Sakic (2) – 15:25 | | First overtime period | | No scoring |
| Patrick Roy 27 saves / 31 shots | | Goalie stats | | Curtis Joseph 30 saves / 35 shots |

| April 28 | Colorado Avalanche | 3–1 | Edmonton Oilers | Edmonton Coliseum | Recap |
| Peter Forsberg (5) – 18:09 | | First period | 17:52 – pp – Ryan Smyth (1) |
| No scoring | | Second period | No scoring |
| Claude Lemieux (3) – 10:59; Peter Forsberg (6) – en – 19:35 | | Third period | No scoring |
| Patrick Roy 26 saves / 27 shots | | Goalie stats | Curtis Joseph 22 saves / 24 shots |

| April 30 | Edmonton Oilers | 3–1 | Colorado Avalanche | McNichols Sports Arena | Recap |
| No scoring | | First period | 16:20 – Stephane Yelle (1) |
| No scoring | | Second period | No scoring |
| Bill Guerin (5) – pp – 04:25; Mike Grier (1) – 13:11; Mike Grier (2) – en – 19:05 | | Third period | No scoring |
| Curtis Joseph 30 saves / 31 shots | | Goalie stats | Patrick Roy 30 saves / 32 shots |

| May 2 | Colorado Avalanche | 0–2 | Edmonton Oilers | Edmonton Coliseum | Recap |
| No scoring | | First period | 03:10 – Drake Berehowsky (1) |
| No scoring | | Second period | No scoring |
| No scoring | | Third period | 10:21 – pp – Boris Mironov (3) |
| Patrick Roy 21 saves / 23 shots | | Goalie stats | Curtis Joseph 31 saves / 31 shots |

| May 4 | Edmonton Oilers | 4–0 | Colorado Avalanche | McNichols Sports Arena | Recap |
| Janne Niinimaa (1) – 04:22; Bill Guerin (6) – 19:22 | | First period | No scoring |
| Todd Marchant (1) – 08:54 | | Second period | No scoring |
| Mats Lindgren (1) – 01:45 | | Third period | No scoring |
| Curtis Joseph 31 saves / 31 shots | | Goalie stats | Patrick Roy 13 saves / 17 shots |

| Edmonton won series 4–3 |

==== (3) Detroit Red Wings vs. (6) Phoenix Coyotes ====
This was the first playoff meeting between these two teams.

| April 22 | Phoenix Coyotes | 3–6 | Detroit Red Wings | Joe Louis Arena | Recap |
| Rick Tocchet (1) – 11:27 | | First period | 05:31 – pp – Nicklas Lidstrom (1); 10:36 – Joey Kocur (1); 12:59 – Sergei Fedorov (1) |
| No scoring | | Second period | 13:26 – Darren McCarty (1); 16:11 – Joey Kocur (2); 19:50 – Kirk Maltby (1) |
| Cliff Ronning (1) – 05:15; Bob Corkum (1) – 11:00 | | Third period | No scoring |
| Nikolai Khabibulin 17 saves / 22 shots Jimmy Waite 12 saves / 13 shots | | Goalie stats | Chris Osgood 17 saves / 20 shots |

| April 24 | Phoenix Coyotes | 7–4 | Detroit Red Wings | Joe Louis Arena | Recap |
| Mike Gartner (1) – pp – 02:34; Keith Tkachuk (1) – 11:00 | | First period | 11:13 – Igor Larionov (1) |
| Rick Tocchet (2) – 04:39; Jeremy Roenick (1) – sh – 07:13; Jeremy Roenick (2) – sh – 13:24; Keith Tkachuk (2) – 13:51 | | Second period | 13:32 – pp – Mathieu Dandenault (1); 15:10 – Sergei Fedorov (2) |
| Rick Tocchet (3) – 01:45 | | Third period | 04:05 – Sergei Fedorov (3) |
| Nikolai Khabibulin 34 saves / 38 shots | | Goalie stats | Chris Osgood 21 saves / 28 shots |

| April 26 | Detroit Red Wings | 2–3 | Phoenix Coyotes | America West Arena | Recap |
| Sergei Fedorov (4) – 00:30; Brendan Shanahan (1) – 01:01 | | First period | No scoring |
| No scoring | | Second period | No scoring |
| No scoring | | Third period | 00:58 – pp – Rick Tocchet (4); 02:19 – pp – Jeremy Roenick (3); 12:47 – Jeremy Roenick (4) |
| Chris Osgood 29 saves / 32 shots | | Goalie stats | Nikolai Khabibulin 25 saves / 27 shots |

| April 28 | Detroit Red Wings | 4–2 | Phoenix Coyotes | America West Arena | Recap |
| No scoring | | First period | 10:07 – pp – Rick Tocchet (5) |
| Igor Larionov (1) – 03:22; Vyacheslav Kozlov (1) – 06:25; Jamie Macoun (1) – 19:59 | | Second period | No scoring |
| Nicklas Lidstrom (2) – 13:59 | | Third period | 18:31 – Shane Doan (1) |
| Chris Osgood 32 saves / 34 shots | | Goalie stats | Nikolai Khabibulin 17 saves / 19 shots Jimmy Waite 18 saves / 20 shots |

| April 30 | Phoenix Coyotes | 1–3 | Detroit Red Wings | Joe Louis Arena | Recap |
| Rick Tocchet (6) – pp – 13:18 | | First period | 08:54 – Tomas Holmstrom (1); 17:26 – Vyacheslav Kozlov (2) |
| No scoring | | Second period | 01:07 – Sergei Fedorov (5) |
| No scoring | | Third period | No scoring |
| Jimmy Waite 24 saves / 27 shots | | Goalie stats | Chris Osgood 17 saves / 18 shots |

| May 3 | Detroit Red Wings | 5–2 | Phoenix Coyotes | America West Arena | Recap |
| Steve Yzerman (1) – pp – 15:28 | | First period | 07:03 – pp – Jeremy Roenick (5) |
| Brendan Shanahan (2) – pp – 03:45; Brendan Shanahan – pp – 14:10; Sergei Fedorov (6) – pp – 18:23 | | Second period | 02:02 – Keith Tkachuk (3) |
| Brent Gilchrist (1) – 12:20 | | Third period | No scoring |
| Chris Osgood 22 saves / 24 shots | | Goalie stats | Jimmy Waite 32 saves / 37 shots |

| Detroit won series 4–2 |

==== (4) St. Louis Blues vs. (5) Los Angeles Kings ====
This was the second playoff meeting between these two teams. Their only previous meeting was in the 1969 Stanley Cup Semifinals, where St. Louis won in a four-game sweep. This was also the first time since 1981 that Los Angeles faced a U.S.-based opponent in the playoffs.

Game four was the last playoff game at the Great Western Forum.

| April 23 | Los Angeles Kings | 3–8 | St. Louis Blues | Kiel Center | Recap |
| Craig Johnson (1) – 05:00 | | First period | 01:42 – Pavol Demitra (1); 04:42 – pp – Geoff Courtnall (1) |
| No scoring | | Second period | 05:46 – pp – Pierre Turgeon (1); 09:17 – Jim Campbell (1); 13:41 – pp – Jim Campbell (2); 15:12 – Pierre Turgeon (2) |
| Glen Murray (1) – 03:19; Luc Robitaille (1) – 07:05 | | Third period | 00:16 – Brett Hull (1); 01:08 – Pavol Demitra (2) |
| Stephane Fiset 22 saves / 27 shots Jamie Storr 10 saves / 13 shots | | Goalie stats | Grant Fuhr 24 saves / 27 shots |

| April 25 | Los Angeles Kings | 1–2 | St. Louis Blues | Kiel Center | Recap |
| No scoring | | First period | No scoring |
| Glen Murray (2) – 07:49 | | Second period | 01:43 – Chris Pronger (1) |
| No scoring | | Third period | 11:37 – pp – Jim Campbell (3) |
| Jamie Storr 25 saves / 27 shots | | Goalie stats | Grant Fuhr 26 saves / 27 shots |

| April 27 | St. Louis Blues | 4–3 | Los Angeles Kings | Great Western Forum | Recap |
| No scoring | | First period | 11:01 – Ian Laperriere (1); 19:51 – pp – Yanic Perreault (1) |
| No scoring | | Second period | 11:03 – Sean O'Donnell (1) |
| Pascal Rheaume (1) – pp – 09:59; Brett Hull (2) – pp – 11:03; Pierre Turgeon (3) – pp – 11:59; Terry Yake (1) – pp – 13:06 | | Third period | No scoring |
| Grant Fuhr 25 saves / 28 shots | | Goalie stats | Jamie Storr 33 saves / 37 shots |

| April 29 | St. Louis Blues | 2–1 | Los Angeles Kings | Great Western Forum | Recap |
| No scoring | | First period | No scoring |
| Pavol Demitra (3) – 08:05 | | Second period | No scoring |
| Craig Conroy (1) – 03:22 | | Third period | 08:00 – Jozef Stumpel (1) |
| Grant Fuhr 29 saves / 30 shots | | Goalie stats | Stephane Fiset 32 saves / 34 shots |

| St. Louis won series 4–0 |

== Conference semifinals ==
=== Eastern Conference semifinals ===
==== (4) Washington Capitals vs. (8) Ottawa Senators ====
This was the first playoff meeting between these two teams.

| May 7 | Ottawa Senators | 2–4 | Washington Capitals | MCI Center | Recap |
| Daniel Alfredsson (4) – sh – 12:21 | | First period | 13:17 – Richard Zednik (2) |
| No scoring | | Second period | 04:03 – Adam Oates (4) |
| Andreas Dackell (1) – pp – 07:12 | | Third period | 02:39 – Peter Bondra (1); 04:25 – Brian Bellows (3) |
| Damian Rhodes 12 saves / 16 shots Ron Tugnutt 7 saves / 7 shots | | Goalie stats | Olaf Kolzig 36 saves / 38 shots |

| May 9 | Ottawa Senators | 1–6 | Washington Capitals | MCI Center | Recap |
| No scoring | | First period | No scoring |
| Alexei Yashin (4) – 10:50 | | Second period | 09:46 – Brendan Witt (1); 11:14 – Joe Juneau (2); 14:59 – Joe Reekie (1); 18:58 – Richard Zednik (3) |
| No scoring | | Third period | 04:43 – pp – Brian Bellows (4); 15:18 – sh – Adam Oates (5) |
| Ron Tugnutt 12 saves / 18 shots | | Goalie stats | Olaf Kolzig 30 saves / 31 shots |

| May 11 | Washington Capitals | 3–4 | Ottawa Senators | Corel Centre | Recap |
| Sergei Gonchar (5) – pp – 10:41 | | First period | 5:24 – pp – Daniel Alfredsson (5); 08:17 – Daniel Alfredsson (6); 16:58 – Daniel Alfredsson (7) |
| Peter Bondra (2) – pp – 01:08; Richard Zednik (4) – 13:49 | | Second period | 10:54 – pp – Alexei Yashin (5) |
| No scoring | | Third period | No scoring |
| Olaf Kolzig 30 saves / 34 shots | | Goalie stats | Damian Rhodes 14 saves / 17 shots |

| May 13 | Washington Capitals | 2–0 | Ottawa Senators | Corel Centre | Recap |
| Sergei Gonchar (6) – sh – 18:30 | | First period | No scoring |
| No scoring | | Second period | No scoring |
| Mark Tinordi (1) – en – 19:55 | | Third period | No scoring |
| Olaf Kolzig 36 saves / 36 shots | | Goalie stats | Damian Rhodes 9 saves / 10 shots |

| May 15 | Ottawa Senators | 0–3 | Washington Capitals | MCI Center | Recap |
| No scoring | | First period | No scoring |
| No scoring | | Second period | 02:39 – Joe Juneau (3) |
| No scoring | | Third period | 18:34 – pp – Sergei Gonchar (7); 19:42 – en – Calle Johansson (2) |
| Damian Rhodes 18 saves / 20 shots | | Goalie stats | Olaf Kolzig 29 saves / 29 shots |

| Washington won series 4–1 |

==== (6) Buffalo Sabres vs. (7) Montreal Canadiens ====
This was the seventh playoff meeting between these two teams; with Montreal winning four of the six previous series. They last met in the 1993 Adams Division Finals, where Montreal won in a four-game sweep.

| May 8 | Montreal Canadiens | 2–3 | OT | Buffalo Sabres | Marine Midland Arena | Recap |
| No scoring | | First period | | 02:52 – Brian Holzinger (3); 09:02 – pp – Geoff Sanderson (1) |
| No scoinrg | | Second period | | No scoring |
| Turner Stevenson (1) – 14:16; Vincent Damphousse (3) – 14:26 | | Third period | | No scoring |
| No scoring | | First overtime period | | 02:37 – Geoff Sanderson (2) |
| Andy Moog 22 saves / 25 shots | | Goalie stats | | Dominik Hasek 46 saves / 48 shots |

| May 10 | Montreal Canadiens | 3–6 | Buffalo Sabres | Marine Midland Arena | Recap |
| Igor Ulanov (1) – 07:18 | | First period | 08:38 – Michal Grosek (5) |
| Vladimir Malakhov (2) – pp – 04:19; Mark Recchi (4) – 14:44 | | Second period | 02:24 – pp – Donald Audette (3); 15:12 – Dixon Ward (3); 18:27 – Matthew Barnaby (2) |
| No scoring | | Third period | 00:13 – Matthew Barnaby (3); 19:11 – en – Matthew Barnaby (4) |
| Andy Moog 16 saves / 21 shots Jocelyn Thibault 3 saves / 3 shots | | Goalie stats | Dominik Hasek 23 saves / 26 shots |

| May 12 | Buffalo Sabres | 5–4 | 2OT | Montreal Canadiens | Molson Centre | Recap |
| Curtis Brown (1) – pp – 04:46; Michael Peca (1) – 11:22; Vaclav Varada (2) – 19:12 | | First period | | 04:23 – Turner Stevenson (2); 12:16 – Turner Stevenson (3) |
| Geoff Sanderson (3) – 04:42 | | Second period | | 04:21 – Saku Koivu (2); 16:30 – Vladimir Malakhov (3) |
| No scoring | | Third period | | No scoring |
| Michael Peca (2) – 01:24 | | Second overtime period | | No scoring |
| Dominik Hasek 42 saves / 46 shots | | Goalie stats | | Jocelyn Thibault 9 saves / 13 shots Jose Theodore 17 saves / 18 shots |

| May 14 | Buffalo Sabres | 3–1 | Montreal Canadiens | Molson Centre | Recap |
| Matthew Barnaby (5) – pp – 04:53 | | First period | No scoring |
| Donald Audette (4) – 08:41; Miroslav Satan (4) – pp – 10:31 | | Second period | 13:31 – pp – Martin Rucinsky (4) |
| No scoring | | Third period | No scoring |
| Dominik Hasek 37 saves / 38 shots | | Goalie stats | Andy Moog 8 saves / 11 shots Jose Theodore 7 saves / 7 shots |

| Buffalo won series 4–0 |

=== Western Conference semifinals ===
==== (1) Dallas Stars vs. (7) Edmonton Oilers ====
This was the second consecutive playoff meeting and the fourth overall playoff match-up between these two teams; with Edmonton winning two of the three previous series. Edmonton won last year's Western Conference Quarterfinals in seven games.

| May 7 | Edmonton Oilers | 1–3 | Dallas Stars | Reunion Arena | Recap |
| No scoring | | First period | 03:14 – pp – Sergei Zubov (2); 08:22 – Sergei Zubov (3) |
| Valeri Zelepukin (1) – 10:34 | | Second period | No scoring |
| No scoring | | Third period | 03:32 – Mike Keane (3) |
| Curtis Joseph 11 saves / 14 shots | | Goalie stats | Ed Belfour 31 saves / 32 shots |

| May 9 | Edmonton Oilers | 2–0 | Dallas Stars | Reunion Arena | Recap |
| No scoring | | First period | No scoring |
| Doug Weight (2) – pp – 16:06 | | Second period | No scoring |
| Rem Murray (1) – en – 19:49 | | Third period | No scoring |
| Curtis Joseph 15 saves / 15 shots | | Goalie stats | Ed Belfour 19 saves / 20 shots |

| May 11 | Dallas Stars | 1–0 | OT | Edmonton Oilers | Edmonton Coliseum | Recap |
| No scoring | | First period | | No scoring |
| No scoring | | Second period | | No scoring |
| No scoring | | Third period | | No scoring |
| Benoit Hogue (2) – 13:07 | | First overtime period | | No scoring |
| Ed Belfour 28 saves / 28 shots | | Goalie stats | | Curtis Joseph 27 saves / 28 shots |

| May 13 | Dallas Stars | 3–1 | Edmonton Oilers | Edmonton Coliseum | Recap |
| Guy Carbonneau (1) – 08:36 | | First period | 10:13 – Scott Fraser (1) |
| Benoit Hogue (3) – 13:52 | | Second period | No scoring |
| Benoit Hogue (4) – 11:45 | | Third period | No scoring |
| Ed Belfour 23 saves / 24 shots | | Goalie stats | Curtis Joseph 33 saves / 36 shots |

| May 16 | Edmonton Oilers | 1–2 | Dallas Stars | Reunion Arena | Recap |
| No scoring | | First period | 19:55 – pp – Derian Hatcher (3) |
| No scoring | | Second period | No scoring |
| Bill Guerin (7) – 19:31 | | Third period | 17:34 – Greg Adams (1) |
| Curtis Joseph 24 saves / 25 shots | | Goalie stats | Ed Belfour 18 saves / 19 shots |

| Dallas won series 4–1 |

==== (3) Detroit Red Wings vs. (4) St. Louis Blues ====
This was the third consecutive playoff meeting and the sixth overall playoff match-up between these two teams; with Detroit winning three of the five previous series. Detroit won last year's Western Conference Quarterfinals in six games.

| May 8 | St. Louis Blues | 4–2 | Detroit Red Wings | Joe Louis Arena | Recap |
| Todd Gill (1) – sh – 03:55 | | First period | No scoring |
| No scoring | | Second period | 14:33 – Martin Lapointe (1) |
| Jim Campbell (4) – pp – 00:18; Brett Hull (3) – 03:48; Jim Campbell (5) – 10:28 | | Third period | 16:46 – pp – Tomas Holmstrom (2) |
| Grant Fuhr 27 saves / 29 shots | | Goalie stats | Chris Osgood 25 saves / 29 shots |

| May 10 | St. Louis Blues | 1–6 | Detroit Red Wings | Joe Louis Arena | Recap |
| Terry Yake – pp – 09:29 | | First period | 17:13 – pp – Martin Lapointe (2) |
| No scoring | | Second period | 09:01 – Nicklas Lidstrom (3); 12:29 – Tomas Holmstrom (3); 18:47 – Steve Yzerman (2) |
| No scoring | | Third period | 18:51 – sh-en – Larry Murphy (1); 19:33 – Kirk Maltby (2) |
| Grant Fuhr 28 saves / 33 shots | | Goalie stats | Chris Osgood 24 saves / 25 shots |

| May 12 | Detroit Red Wings | 3–2 | 2OT | St. Louis Blues | Kiel Center | Recap |
| Darren McCarty (2) – 03:10 | | First period | | 09:15 – pp – Al MacInnis (1) |
| Tomas Holmstrom (4) – 01:36 | | Second period | | No scoring |
| No scoring | | Third period | | 19:05 – Al MacInnis (2) |
| Brendan Shanahan (4) – 11:12 | | Second overtime period | | No scoring |
| Chris Osgood 33 saves / 35 shots | | Goalie stats | | Grant Fuhr 42 saves / 45 shots |

| May 14 | Detroit Red Wings | 5–2 | St. Louis Blues | Kiel Center | Recap |
| Brendan Shanahan (5) – pp – 09:20 | | First period | No scoring |
| Joey Kocur (3) – 00:54 | | Second period | 01:16 – Jim Campbell (6); 19:53 – Pierre Turgeon (4) |
| Vyacheslav Kozlov (3) – 01:12; Sergei Fedorov (7) – sh – 08:05; Sergei Fedorov (8) – 19:14 | | Third period | No scoring |
| Grant Fuhr 19 saves / 23 shots | | Goalie stats | Chris Osgood 26 saves / 28 shots |

| May 17 | St. Louis Blues | 3–1 | Detroit Red Wings | Joe Louis Arena | Recap |
| No scoring | | First period | No scoring |
| Geoff Courtnall (2) – 01:44; Mike Eastwood (1) – 02:58; Todd Gill (2) – pp – 09:21 | | Second period | 11:03 – sh – Martin Lapointe (3) |
| No scoring | | Third period | No scoring |
| Grant Fuhr 29 saves / 30 shots | | Goalie stats | Chris Osgood 20 saves / 23 shots Kevin Hodson 0 saves / 0 shots |

| May 19 | Detroit Red Wings | 6–1 | St. Louis Blues | Kiel Center | Recap |
| Darren McCarty (3) – 12:08; Doug Brown (1) – pp – 14:29 | | First period | No scoring |
| Martin Lapointe (4) – pp – 05:03; Martin Lapointe (5) – 07:56 | | Second period | No scoring |
| Tomas Holmstrom (5) – 05:53; Steve Yzerman (3) – pp – 09:40 | | Third period | 14:35 – pp – Jim Campbell (7) |
| Chris Osgood 30 saves / 31 shots | | Goalie stats | Grant Fuhr 20 saves / 25 shots Jamie McLennan 3 saves / 4 shots |

| Detroit won series 4–2 |

== Conference finals ==
=== Eastern Conference final ===
==== (4) Washington Capitals vs. (6) Buffalo Sabres ====
This was the first playoff meeting between these two teams. Washington made their second Conference Finals appearance; they last made it to the Conference Finals in 1990 where they lost to the Boston Bruins in a four-game sweep. This was the first conference final for Buffalo since the playoffs went to a conference format starting in 1982. Buffalo last played a semifinal series in 1980 where they lost to the New York Islanders in six games. These teams split their four-game regular season series.

| May 23 | Buffalo Sabres | 2–0 | Washington Capitals | MCI Center | Recap |
| No scoring | | First period | No scoring |
| Michal Grosek (6) – 00:31; Miroslav Satan (5) – 01:55 | | Second period | No scoring |
| No scoring | | Third period | No scoring |
| Dominik Hasek 19 saves / 19 shots | | Goalie stats | Olaf Kolzig 18 saves / 20 shots |

| May 25 | Buffalo Sabres | 2–3 | OT | Washington Capitals | MCI Center | Recap |
| Vaclav Varada (3) – 19:02 | | First period | | No scoring |
| No scoring | | Second period | | 19:55 – pp – Peter Bondra (3) |
| Matthew Barnaby (6) – pp – 19:03 | | Third period | | 14:06 – Joe Juneau (4) |
| No scoring | | First overtime period | | 03:01 – Todd Krygier (1) |
| Dominik Hasek 36 saves / 39 shots | | Goalie stats | | Olaf Kolzig 31 saves / 33 shots |

| May 28 | Washington Capitals | 4–3 | OT | Buffalo Sabres | Marine Midland Arena | Recap |
| Peter Bondra (4) – 04:57; Richard Zednik (5) – pp – 10:27 | | First period | | 14:59 – pp – Donald Audette (5) |
| Richard Zednik (6) – pp – 16:17 | | Second period | | 02:08 – Matthew Barnaby (7); 12:12 – Brian Holzinger (4) |
| No scoring | | Third period | | No scoring |
| Peter Bondra (5) – 09:37 | | First overtime period | | No scoring |
| Olaf Kolzig 27 saves / 30 shots | | Goalie stats | | Dominik Hasek 26 saves / 30 shots |

| May 30 | Washington Capitals | 2–0 | Buffalo Sabres | Marine Midland Arena | Recap |
| No scoring | | First period | No scoring |
| No scoring | | Second period | No scoring |
| Craig Berube (1) – 02:34; Joe Juneau (5) – sh – 13:38 | | Third period | No scoring |
| Olaf Kolzig 30 saves / 30 shots | | Goalie stats | Dominik Hasek 17 saves / 19 shots |

| June 2 | Buffalo Sabres | 2–1 | Washington Capitals | MCI Center | Recap |
| Darryl Shannon (2) – 06:33 | | First period | 16:29 – pp – Andrei Nikolishin (1) |
| No scoring | | Second period | No scoring |
| Jason Woolley (2) – 15:34 | | Third period | No scoring |
| Dominik Hasek 34 saves / 35 shots | | Goalie stats | Olaf Kolzig 14 saves / 16 shots |

| June 4 | Washington Capitals | 3–2 | OT | Buffalo Sabres | Marine Midland Arena | Recap |
| No scoring | | First period | | No scoring |
| Esa Tikkanen (3) – 13:26 | | Second period | | 13:04 – Michael Peca (3) |
| Peter Bondra (6) – pp – 14:01 | | Third period | | 07:40 – Paul Kruse (1) |
| Joe Juneau (6) – 06:24 | | First overtime period | | No scoring |
| Olaf Kolzig 39 saves / 41 shots | | Goalie stats | | Dominik Hasek 35 saves / 38 shots |

| Washington won series 4–2 |

=== Western Conference final ===
==== (1) Dallas Stars vs. (3) Detroit Red Wings ====
This was the third playoff meeting between these two teams; with Detroit winning both previous series. They last met in the 1995 Western Conference Quarterfinals, where Detroit won in five games. Dallas made their third appearance in the Conference Finals. They last made it to the Conference Finals in 1991, where the Minnesota North Stars defeated the Edmonton Oilers in five games. Detroit made their fourth consecutive and sixth overall appearance in the Conference Finals; they defeated the Colorado Avalanche in the previous year in six games. Detroit won this year's five-game regular season series earning eight of ten points.

| May 24 | Detroit Red Wings | 2–0 | Dallas Stars | Reunion Arena | Recap |
| No scoring | | First period | No scoring |
| Vyacheslav Kozlov (4) – pp – 00:57; Martin Lapointe (6) – 13:38 | | Second period | No scoring |
| No scoring | | Third period | No scoring |
| Chris Osgood 14 saves / 14 shots | | Goalie stats | Ed Belfour 21 saves / 23 shots |

| May 26 | Detroit Red Wings | 1–3 | Dallas Stars | Reunion Arena | Recap |
| No scoring | | First period | 05:56 – Bob Bassen (1) |
| Vyacheslav Kozlov (5) – 12:59 | | Second period | 11:12 – Greg Adams (2) |
| No scoring | | Third period | 19:50 – en – Guy Carbonneau (2) |
| Chris Osgood 20 saves / 22 shots | | Goalie stats | Ed Belfour 27 saves / 28 shots |

| May 29 | Dallas Stars | 3–5 | Detroit Red Wings | Joe Louis Arena | Recap |
| No scoring | | First period | 05:50 – Brent Gilchrist (2); 12:43 – pp – Nicklas Lidstrom (4) |
| Jere Lehtinen (2) – 13:13 | | Second period | 04:13 – Nicklas Lidstrom (5); 05:33 – Jamie Macoun (2) |
| Jere Lehtinen (3) – 04:39; Mike Modano (4) – 07:34 | | Third period | 15:55 – Martin Lapointe (7) |
| Ed Belfour 15 saves / 20 shots | | Goalie stats | Chris Osgood 31 saves / 34 shots |

| May 31 | Dallas Stars | 2–3 | Detroit Red Wings | Joe Louis Arena | Recap |
| No scoring | | First period | 07:02 – sh – Kirk Maltby (3); 12:10 – pp – Steve Yzerman (4) |
| Pat Verbeek (3) – 14:31 | | Second period | No scoring |
| Sergei Zubov (4) – pp – 00:55 | | Third period | 11:30 – Vyacheslav Kozlov (6) |
| Ed Belfour 20 saves / 23 shots | | Goalie stats | Chris Osgood 28 saves / 30 shots |

| June 3 | Detroit Red Wings | 2–3 | OT | Dallas Stars | Reunion Arena | Recap |
| Tomas Holmstrom (6) – pp – 19:17 | | First period | | 14:16 – Mike Keane (4) |
| Igor Larionov (3) – 03:40 | | Second period | | No scoring |
| No scoring | | Third period | | 18:35 – Guy Carbonneau (3) |
| No scoring | | First overtime period | | 00:46 – Jamie Langenbrunner (1) |
| Chris Osgood 33 saves / 36 shots | | Goalie stats | | Ed Belfour 18 saves / 20 shots |

| June 5 | Dallas Stars | 0–2 | Detroit Red Wings | Joe Louis Arena | Recap |
| No scoring | | First period | 06:20 – sh – Larry Murphy (2) |
| No scoring | | Second period | 01:48 – Sergei Fedorov (9) |
| No scoring | | Third period | No scoring |
| Ed Belfour 29 saves / 31 shots | | Goalie stats | Chris Osgood 26 saves / 26 shots |

| Detroit won series 4–2 |

== Stanley Cup Finals ==
This was the first and to date only playoff meeting between these two teams. Detroit made their twenty-first and second consecutive Finals appearance, while Washington made their first Finals appearance in their twenty-fourth season. Until 2017, this was the last time that the Stanley Cup was successfully defended by the previous year's champion. The Red Wings swept the Capitals to repeat as Stanley Cup champions. The Red Wings became the fourth franchise to win the Stanley Cup in back-to-back sweeps, joining the Toronto Maple Leafs, Montreal Canadiens, and New York Islanders, and remain the most recent team to accomplish this feat.

As of 2026, this remains the last Stanley Cup Final to end in a sweep.

| June 9 | Washington Capitals | 1–2 | Detroit Red Wings | Joe Louis Arena | Recap |
| No scoring | | First period | 14:04 – Joe Kocur (4); 16:18 – Nicklas Lidstrom (6) |
| Richard Zednik (7) – 15:57 | | Second period | No scoring |
| No scoring | | Third period | No scoring |
| Olaf Kolzig 29 saves / 31 shots | | Goalie stats | Chris Osgood 16 saves / 17 shots |

| June 11 | Washington Capitals | 4–5 | OT | Detroit Red Wings | Joe Louis Arena | Recap |
| No scoring | | First period | | 07:49 – Steve Yzerman (5) |
| Peter Bondra (7) – 01:51; Chris Simon (1) – 06:11; Adam Oates (6) – 11:03 | | Second period | | No scoring |
| Joe Juneau (7) – pp – 07:05 | | Third period | | 06:37 – sh – Steve Yzerman (6); 08:08 – Martin Lapointe (8); 15:46 – Doug Brown (2) |
| No scoring | | First overtime period | | 15:24 – Kris Draper (1) |
| Olaf Kolzig 55 saves / 60 shots | | Goalie stats | | Chris Osgood 29 saves / 33 shots |

| June 13 | Detroit Red Wings | 2–1 | Washington Capitals | MCI Center | Recap |
| Tomas Holmstrom (7) – 00:35 | | First period | No scoring |
| No scoring | | Second period | No scoring |
| Sergei Fedorov (10) – 15:09 | | Third period | 10:35 – pp – Brian Bellows (5) |
| Chris Osgood 17 saves / 18 shots | | Goalie stats | Olaf Kolzig 32 saves / 34 shots |

| June 16 | Detroit Red Wings | 4–1 | Washington Capitals | MCI Center | Recap |
| Doug Brown (3) – pp – 10:30 | | First period | No scoring |
| Martin Lapointe (9) – 02:26; Larry Murphy (3) – pp – 11:46 | | Second period | 07:49 – Brian Bellows (6) |
| Doug Brown (4) – pp – 01:32 | | Third period | No scoring |
| Chris Osgood 30 saves / 31 shots | | Goalie stats | Olaf Kolzig 34 saves / 38 shots |

| Detroit won series 4–0 |

== Playoff statistics ==
=== Skaters ===
These are the top ten skaters based on points.

| Player | Team | GP | G | A | Pts | +/– | PIM |
|---|---|---|---|---|---|---|---|
| Steve Yzerman | Detroit Red Wings | 22 | 6 | 18 | 24 | +10 | 22 |
| Sergei Fedorov | Detroit Red Wings | 22 | 10 | 10 | 20 | 0 | 12 |
| Tomas Holmstrom | Detroit Red Wings | 22 | 7 | 12 | 19 | +9 | 16 |
| Nicklas Lidstrom | Detroit Red Wings | 22 | 6 | 13 | 19 | +12 | 8 |
| Joe Juneau | Washington Capitals | 21 | 7 | 10 | 17 | +6 | 8 |
| Adam Oates | Washington Capitals | 21 | 6 | 11 | 17 | +8 | 8 |
| Martin Lapointe | Detroit Red Wings | 21 | 9 | 6 | 15 | +6 | 20 |
| Larry Murphy | Detroit Red Wings | 22 | 3 | 12 | 15 | +12 | 2 |
| Vyacheslav Kozlov | Detroit Red Wings | 22 | 6 | 8 | 14 | +4 | 10 |
| Mike Modano | Dallas Stars | 17 | 4 | 10 | 14 | +4 | 12 |

=== Goaltenders ===
This is a combined table of the top five goaltenders based on goals against average and the top five goaltenders based on save percentage, with at least 420 minutes played. The table is sorted by GAA, and the criteria for inclusion are bolded.

| Player | Team | GP | W | L | SA | GA | GAA | SV% | SO | TOI |
|---|---|---|---|---|---|---|---|---|---|---|
| Ed Belfour | Dallas Stars | 17 | 10 | 7 | 399 | 31 | **1.79** | **.922** | 1 | 1039:02 |
| Curtis Joseph | Edmonton Oilers | 12 | 5 | 7 | 319 | 23 | **1.93** | **.928** | 3 | 715:52 |
| Olaf Kolzig | Washington Capitals | 21 | 12 | 9 | 740 | 44 | **1.95** | **.941** | 4 | 1351:04 |
| Byron Dafoe | Boston Bruins | 6 | 2 | 4 | 159 | 14 | **1.99** | .912 | 1 | 421:59 |
| Dominik Hasek | Buffalo Sabres | 15 | 10 | 5 | 514 | 32 | **2.03** | **.938** | 1 | 947:55 |

== See also ==
- 1997–98 NHL season

| Preceded by 1997 Stanley Cup playoffs | Stanley Cup playoffs | Succeeded by 1999 Stanley Cup playoffs |
