= 1997 Stanley Cup playoffs =

National Hockey League playoffs

Tournament details
- Dates: April 16–June 7, 1997
- Teams: 16
- Defending champions: Colorado Avalanche

Final positions
- Champions: Detroit Red Wings
- Runners-up: Philadelphia Flyers

Tournament statistics
- Scoring leader(s): Eric Lindros (Flyers) (26 points)

Awards
- MVP: Mike Vernon (Red Wings)

The 1997 Stanley Cup playoffs, the playoff tournament of the National Hockey League (NHL), began on April 16, 1997, following the completion of the 1996–97 NHL season. The sixteen teams that qualified, eight from each conference, played best-of-seven series for conference quarterfinals, semifinals and championships, and then the conference champions played a best-of-seven series for the Stanley Cup.

The playoffs ended on June 7, with the Detroit Red Wings defeating the Philadelphia Flyers in a four-game sweep to win their eighth Stanley Cup championship in their history, and their first since 1955, ending what was the longest championship drought in the league at the time. Red Wings goaltender Mike Vernon was awarded the Conn Smythe Trophy as the playoff's Most Valuable Player. This was the only time Ray Bourque missed the playoffs in his career. His team, the Boston Bruins, missed the playoffs for the first time since 1967, ending their 29-year consecutive playoffs appearances record. The longest active appearance streak moved to the Chicago Blackhawks at 28 consecutive seasons.

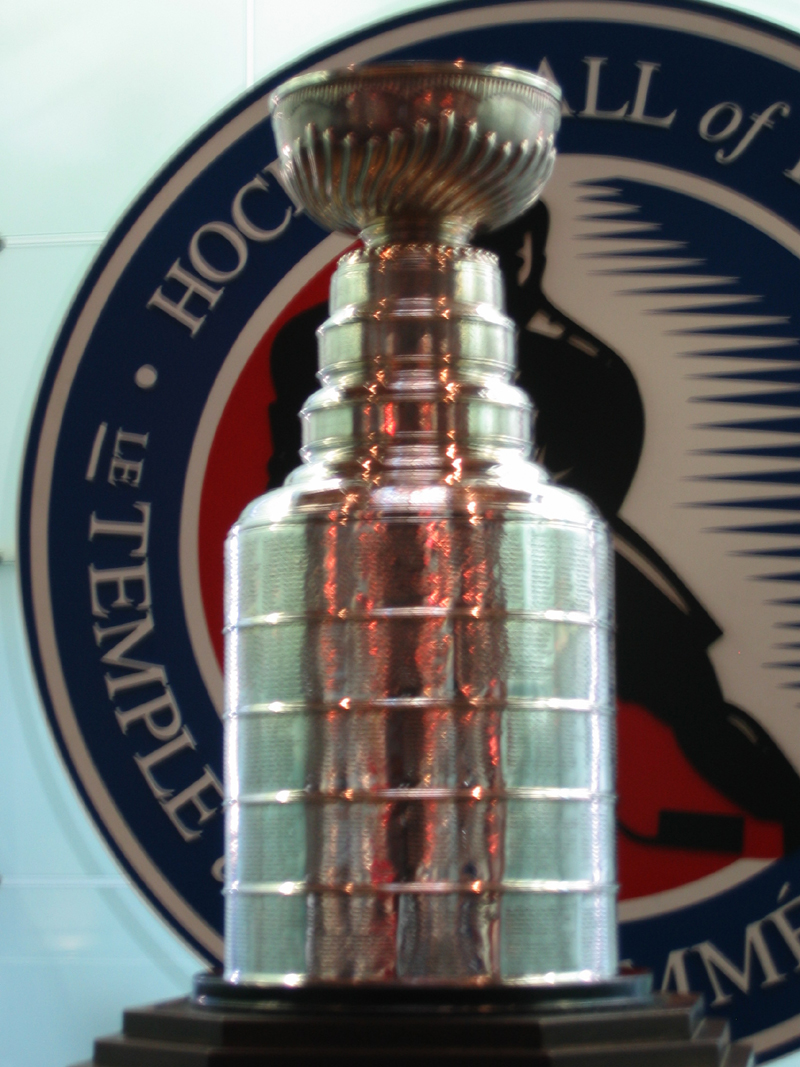
The Stanley Cup, awarded to the champion of the NHL.

== Playoff seeds ==
The top eight teams in each conference qualified for the playoffs. The top two seeds in each conference were awarded to the division winners; while the six remaining spots were awarded to the highest finishers in their respective conferences.

The following teams qualified for the playoffs:

=== Eastern Conference ===
1. New Jersey Devils, Atlantic Division champions, Eastern Conference regular season champions – 104 points
2. Buffalo Sabres, Northeast Division champions – 92 points
3. Philadelphia Flyers – 103 points
4. Florida Panthers – 89 points
5. New York Rangers – 86 points
6. Pittsburgh Penguins – 84 points
7. Ottawa Senators – 77 points (31 wins, 8 points head-to-head vs. Montreal)
8. Montreal Canadiens – 77 points (31 wins, 2 points head-to-head vs. Ottawa)

=== Western Conference ===
1. Colorado Avalanche, Pacific Division champions, Western Conference regular season champions, Presidents' Trophy winners – 107 points
2. Dallas Stars, Central Division champions – 104 points
3. Detroit Red Wings – 94 points
4. Mighty Ducks of Anaheim – 85 points
5. Phoenix Coyotes – 83 points (38 wins)
6. St. Louis Blues – 83 points (36 wins)
7. Edmonton Oilers – 81 points (36 wins)
8. Chicago Blackhawks – 81 points (34 wins)

== Playoff bracket ==
In each round, teams competed in a best-of-seven series, following a 2–2–1–1–1 format (scores in the bracket indicate the number of games won in each best-of-seven series). The team with home ice advantage played at home for games one and two (and games five and seven, if necessary), and the other team played at home for games three and four (and game six, if necessary). For any series played between Central and Pacific Division teams, the team with home ice advantage had the option of using a 2–3–2 format to reduce travel, with the sites for games five and six switched; if the 2–3–2 format was chosen, the team with home ice advantage then had the additional option to start the series on the road instead of at home. The top eight teams in each conference made the playoffs, with the two division winners seeded 1–2 based on regular season record, and the six remaining teams seeded 3–8.

The NHL used "re-seeding" instead of a fixed bracket playoff system. During the first three rounds, the highest remaining seed in each conference was matched against the lowest remaining seed, the second-highest remaining seed played the second-lowest remaining seed, and so forth. The higher-seeded team was awarded home ice advantage. The two conference winners then advanced to the Stanley Cup Final, where home ice advantage was awarded to the team that had the better regular season record.

Conference quarterfinals	Conference semifinals
1	New Jersey	4
8	Montreal	1
1	New Jersey	1
5	NY Rangers	4
2	Buffalo	4
7	Ottawa	3
Eastern Conference
3	Philadelphia	4
6	Pittsburgh	1
2	Buffalo	1
3	Philadelphia	4
4	Florida	1
5	NY Rangers	4
1	Colorado	4
8	Chicago	2
1	Colorado	4
7	Edmonton	1
2	Dallas	3
7	Edmonton	4
Western Conference
3	Detroit	4
6	St. Louis	2
3	Detroit	4
4	Anaheim	0
4	Anaheim	4
5	Phoenix	3

Conference finals
5	NY Rangers	1
3	Philadelphia	4
1	Colorado	2
3	Detroit	4

Stanley Cup Final
E3	Philadelphia	0
W3	Detroit	4

== Conference quarterfinals ==
=== Eastern Conference quarterfinals ===
==== (1) New Jersey Devils vs. (8) Montreal Canadiens ====
This was the first playoff meeting between these two teams.

Martin Brodeur became the fourth goaltender in league history to score a goal in game one, marking the second time in NHL history that a goaltender had scored a goal in the Stanley Cup playoffs, and the fifth time overall.

April 17	Montreal Canadiens	2–5	New Jersey Devils	Continental Airlines Arena	Recap
No scoring		First period	04:28 – Brian Rolston (1); 08:07 – pp – Shawn Chambers (1)
Shayne Corson – sh – 05:40; Benoit Brunet (1) – sh – 17:17		Second period	No scoring
No scoring		Third period	05:19 – Bill Guerin (1); 11:59 – sh – Brian Rolston (2); 19:15 – en – Martin Brodeur (1)
Jocelyn Thibault 30 saves / 34 shots		Goalie stats	Martin Brodeur 28 saves / 30 shots

April 19	Montreal Canadiens	1–4	New Jersey Devils	Continental Airlines Arena	Recap
No scoring		First period	05:56 – pp – John MacLean (1)
No scoring		Second period	11:29 – pp – John MacLean (2); 15:49 – pp – Bill Guerin (2)
Brian Savage (1) – 14:33		Third period	04:58 – Bobby Carpenter (1)
Jocelyn Thibault 37 saves / 41 shots		Goalie stats	Martin Brodeur 21 saves / 22 shots

April 22	New Jersey Devils	6–4	Montreal Canadiens	Molson Centre	Recap
Patrik Elias (1) – pp – 14:02; Bobby Holik (1) – 19:35		First period	00:34 – Mark Recchi (1); 17:06 – Scott Thornton (1)
Valeri Zelepukin (1) – 04:58; Valeri Zelepukin (2) – 07:15		Second period	02:39 – Mark Recchi (2)
Valeri Zelepukin (3) – pp – 07:50; Brian Rolston (3) – sh-en – 19:01		Third period	04:37 – Saku Koivu (1)
Martin Brodeur 21 saves / 25 shots		Goalie stats	Jocelyn Thibault 21 saves / 26 shots

April 24	New Jersey Devils	3–4	3OT	Montreal Canadiens	Molson Centre	Recap
Scott Niedermayer (1) – pp – 03:11; Patrik Elias (2) – 11:53		First period		No scoring
No scoring		Second period		07:42 – Mark Recchi (3)
Lyle Odelein (1) – 18:24		Third period		02:41 – Turner Stevenson (1); 05:03 – Mark Recchi (4)
No scoring		Third overtime period		07:37 – Patrice Brisebois (1)
Martin Brodeur 37 saves / 41 shots		Goalie stats		Jose Theodore 56 saves / 59 shots

April 26	Montreal Canadiens	0–4	New Jersey Devils	Continental Airlines Arena	Recap
No scoring		First period	17:32 – Kevin Dean (1)
No scoring		Second period	14:17 – pp – Bobby Holik (2)
No scoring		Third period	08:01 – sh – John MacLean (3); 11:08 – pp – Lyle Odelein (2)
Jose Theodore 45 saves / 49 shots		Goalie stats	Martin Brodeur 24 saves / 24 shots

New Jersey won series 4–1

==== (2) Buffalo Sabres vs. (7) Ottawa Senators ====
This was the first playoff meeting between these two teams. This series marked the first appearance of a team representing Ottawa in the Stanley Cup playoffs in 67 years. The most recent team to represent Ottawa prior to this was the original Ottawa Senators, who lost in the Quarterfinal round in 1930.

April 17	Ottawa Senators	1–3	Buffalo Sabres	Marine Midland Arena	Recap
No scoring		First period	No scoring
No scoring		Second period	14:30 – sh – Brian Holzinger (1)
Daniel Alfredsson (1) – pp – 03:57		Third period	05:08 – Derek Plante (1); 14:09 – pp – Randy Burridge (1)
Ron Tugnutt 23 saves / 26 shots		Goalie stats	Dominik Hasek 22 saves / 23 shots

April 19	Ottawa Senators	3–1	Buffalo Sabres	Marine Midland Arena	Recap
Andreas Dackell (1) – 02:48		First period	No scoring
Steve Duchesne (1) – pp – 08:37		Second period	09:34 – Randy Burridge (2)
Daniel Alfredsson (2) – pp – 00:18		Third period	No scoring
Ron Tugnutt 23 saves / 24 shots		Goalie stats	Dominik Hasek 26 saves / 29 shots

April 21	Buffalo Sabres	3–2	Ottawa Senators	Corel Centre	Recap
No scoring		First period	No scoring
Randy Burridge (3) – 13:27		Second period	15:31 – pp – Sergei Zholtok (1); 17:41 – pp – Alexei Yashin (1)
Darryl Shannon (1) – 11:51; Dixon Ward (1) – 19:40		Third period	No scoring
Dominik Hasek 15 saves / 16 shots Steve Shields 11 saves / 12 shots		Goalie stats	Ron Tugnutt 22 saves / 25 shots

April 23	Buffalo Sabres	0–1	OT	Ottawa Senators	Corel Centre	Recap
No scoring		First period		No scoring
No scoring		Second period		No scoring
No scoring		Third period		No scoring
No scoring		First overtime period		02:34 – Daniel Alfredsson (3)
Steve Shields 35 saves / 36 shots		Goalie stats		Ron Tugnutt 17 saves / 17 shots

April 25	Ottawa Senators	4–1	Buffalo Sabres	Marine Midland Arena	Recap
Shawn McEachern (1) – 16:14		First period	No scoring
Daniel Alfredsson (4) – 01:00		Second period	No scoring
Daniel Alfredsson (5) – sh – 00:28; Randy Cunneyworth (1) – 13:56		Third period	01:19 – Donald Audette (1)
Ron Tugnutt 24 saves / 25 shots		Goalie stats	Steve Shields 22 saves / 26 shots Andrei Trefilov 4 saves / 4 shots

April 27	Buffalo Sabres	3–0	Ottawa Senators	Corel Centre	Recap
Brian Holzinger (2) – 03:25		First period	No scoring
Alexei Zhitnik (1) – 07:46		Second period	No scoring
Jason Dawe (1) – 15:44		Third period	No scoring
Steve Shields 31 saves / 31 shots		Goalie stats	Ron Tugnutt 18 saves / 21 shots

April 29	Ottawa Senators	2–3	OT	Buffalo Sabres	Marine Midland Arena	Recap
Shawn McEachern (2) – pp – 10:50		First period		No scoring
No scoring		Second period		16:03 – pp – Donald Audette (2)
Wade Redden (1) – 00:45		Third period		06:29 – Derek Plante (2)
No scoring		First overtime period		05:24 – Derek Plante (3)
Ron Tugnutt 28 saves / 31 shots		Goalie stats		Steve Shields 25 saves / 27 shots

Buffalo won series 4–3

==== (3) Philadelphia Flyers vs. (6) Pittsburgh Penguins ====
This was the second playoff meeting between these two teams; with Philadelphia winning the only previous series in the 1989 Patrick Division Finals in seven games.

April 17	Pittsburgh Penguins	1–5	Philadelphia Flyers	CoreStates Center	Recap
No scoring		First period	07:45 – Pat Falloon (1)
No scoring		Second period	00:39 – John LeClair (1); 19:28 – pp – Rod Brind'Amour (1)
Jaromir Jagr (1) – 05:00		Third period	08:51 – pp – Eric Lindros (1); 18:17 – Pat Falloon (2)
Ken Wregget 33 saves / 38 shots		Goalie stats	Garth Snow 27 saves / 28 shots

April 19	Pittsburgh Penguins	2–3	Philadelphia Flyers	CoreStates Center	Recap
Mario Lemieux (1) – 10:59		First period	No scoring
No scoring		Second period	No scoring
Jaromir Jagr (2) – 04:44		Third period	03:23 – Joel Otto (1); 05:52 – John LeClair (2); 13:40 – Trent Klatt (1)
Ken Wregget 36 saves / 39 shots		Goalie stats	Garth Snow 28 saves /30 shots

April 21	Philadelphia Flyers	5–3	Pittsburgh Penguins	Civic Arena	Recap
Mikael Renberg (1) – 07:54		First period	07:19 – pp – Jaromir Jagr (3); 16:29 – pp – Jaromir Jagr (4)
Pat Falloon (3) – pp – 10:33; Eric Lindros (2) – 13:46; John LeClair (3) – pp – 19:48		Second period	No scoring
Dainius Zubrus (1) – 18:28		Third period	19:44 – Greg Johnson (1)
Garth Snow 35 saves / 38 shots		Goalie stats	Ken Wregget 48 saves / 52 shots

April 23	Philadelphia Flyers	1–4	Pittsburgh Penguins	Civic Arena	Recap
Shjon Podein (1) – 01:45		First period	01:09 – Ian Moran (1); 13:22 – sh – Eddie Olczyk (1); 18:28 – sh – Petr Nedved (1)
No scoring		Second period	No scoring
No scoring		Third period	18:56 – Mario Lemieux (2)
Garth Snow 21 saves / 25 shots		Goalie stats	Ken Wregget 37 saves /38 shots

April 26	Pittsburgh Penguins	3–6	Philadelphia Flyers	CoreStates Center	Recap
Kevin Hatcher (1) – pp – 05:37; Mario Lemieux (3) – 15:34		First period	00:14 – Eric Lindros (3); 17:38 – sh – Rod Brind'Amour (2); 18:32 – sh – Rod Brind'Amour (3)
Ron Francis (1) – pp – 02:37		Second period	07:30 – John LeClair (4); 10:28 – Trent Klatt (2)
No scoring		Third period	19:55 – en – Vinny Prospal (1)
Ken Wregget 39 saves / 44 shots		Goalie stats	Garth Snow 15 saves / 18 shots

Philadelphia won series 4–1

==== (4) Florida Panthers vs. (5) New York Rangers ====
This was the first playoff meeting between these two teams. Game 5 was the final playoff game played at Miami Arena.

April 17	New York Rangers	0–3	Florida Panthers	Miami Arena	Recap
No scoring		First period	No scoring
No scoring		Second period	06:06 – pp – Johan Garpenlov (1); 13:13 – pp – Kirk Muller (1); 15:07 – Rob Niedermayer (1)
No scoring		Third period	No scoring
Mike Richter 25 saves /28 shots		Goalie stats	John Vanbiesbrouck 34 saves /34 shots

April 20	New York Rangers	3–0	Florida Panthers	Miami Arena	Recap
No scoring		First period	No scoring
Wayne Gretzky (1) – 13:15; Esa Tikkanen (1) – pp – 14:58		Second period	No scoring
Luc Robitaille (1) – 03:29		Third period	No scoring
Mike Richter 31 saves / 31 shots		Goalie stats	John Vanbiesbrouck 41 saves / 44 shots

April 22	Florida Panthers	3–4	OT	New York Rangers	Madison Square Garden	Recap
No scoring		First period		13:12 – Mike Eastwood (1); 17:09 – Luc Robitaille (2)
Johan Garpenlov (2) – pp – 01:16; Ray Sheppard (1) – 02:58; Robert Svehla (1) – pp – 16:32		Second period		No scoring
No scoring		Third period		19:41 – Luc Robitaille (3)
No scoring		First overtime period		16:29 – Esa Tikkanen (2)
John Vanbiesbrouck 41 saves / 45 shots		Goalie stats		Mike Richter 36 saves / 39 shots

April 23	Florida Panthers	2–3	New York Rangers	Madison Square Garden	Recap
Rob Niedermayer (2) – pp – 13:23		First period	No scoring
No scoring		Second period	03:07 – pp – Wayne Gretzky (2); 06:46 – Wayne Gretzky (3); 09:30 – Wayne Gretzky (4)
David Nemirovsky (1) – 01:40		Third period	No scoring
John Vanbiesbrouck 25 saves / 28 shots		Goalie stats	Mike Richter 21 saves / 23 shots

April 25	New York Rangers	3–2	OT	Florida Panthers	Miami Arena	Recap
Mark Messier (1) – 00:39		First period		14:17 – Mike Hough (1)
Mark Messier (2) – 19:44		Second period		No scoring
No scoring		Third period		12:37 – pp – Ray Sheppard (2)
Esa Tikkanen (3) – 12:02		First overtime period		No scoring
Mike Richter 38 saves /40 shots		Goalie stats		John Vanbiesbrouck 30 saves / 33 shots

New York won series 4–1

=== Western Conference quarterfinals ===
==== (1) Colorado Avalanche vs. (8) Chicago Blackhawks ====
This was the second consecutive and second overall playoff meeting between these two teams; with Colorado winning last year's series in six games.

April 16	Chicago Blackhawks	0–6	Colorado Avalanche	McNichols Sports Arena	Recap
No scoring		First period	05:54 – Mike Keane (1); 09:23 – pp – Sandis Ozolinsh (1); 12:48 – pp – Peter Forsberg (1); 19:00 – Peter Forsberg (2)
No scoring		Second period	16:14 – Mike Ricci (1)
No scoring		Third period	05:31 – Claude Lemieux (1)
Jeff Hackett 19 saves / 24 shots Chris Terreri 13 saves / 14 shots		Goalie stats	Patrick Roy 22 saves / 22 shots

April 18	Chicago Blackhawks	1–3	Colorado Avalanche	McNichols Sports Arena	Recap
James Black (1) – 17:53		First period	03:53 – Mike Keane (1); 05:06 – Sandis Ozolinsh (2)
No scoring		Second period	07:30 – Claude Lemieux (2)
No scoring		Third period	No scoring
Jeff Hackett 30 saves / 33 shots		Goalie stats	Patrick Roy 24 saves / 25 shots

April 20	Colorado Avalanche	3–4	2OT	Chicago Blackhawks	United Center	Recap
No scoring		First period		09:38 – Eric Daze (1)
Keith Jones (1) – 10:59		Second period		13:51 – Tony Amonte (1)
Rene Corbet (1) – 15:25; Claude Lemieux (3) – 17:28		Third period		04:00 – Eric Daze (2)
No scoring		Second overtime period		Sergei Krivokrasov (1) – 11:03
Patrick Roy 53 saves / 57 shots		Goalie stats		Jeff Hackett 48 saves / 51 shots

April 22	Colorado Avalanche	3–6	Chicago Blackhawks	United Center	Recap
Keith Jones (2) – 09:31; Joe Sakic (1) – 14:17		First period	03:34 – Tony Amonte (2)
No scoring		Second period	05:53 – Bob Probert (1); 06:57 – Ethan Moreau (1); 10:16 – pp – Bob Probert (2); 17:53 – Steve Dubinsky (1)
Aaron Miller (1) – 16:00		Third period	14:28 – sh-en – Tony Amonte (3)
Patrick Roy 25 saves / 30 shots		Goalie stats	Jeff Hackett 29 saves / 32 shots

April 24	Chicago Blackhawks	0–7	Colorado Avalanche	McNichols Sports Arena	Recap
No scoring		First period	02:53 – pp – Claude Lemieux (4); 09:14 – Mike Keane (3); 16:49 – pp – Valeri Kamensky (1)
No scoring		Second period	14:12 – pp – Valeri Kamensky (2); 16:44 – Jon Klemm (1)
No scoring		Third period	08:01 – pp – Valeri Kamensky (3); 15:13 – pp – Keith Jones (3)
Jeff Hackett 16 saves / 21 shots Chris Terreri 12 saves / 14 shots		Goalie stats	Patrick Roy 25 saves / 25 shots

April 26	Colorado Avalanche	6–3	Chicago Blackhawks	United Center	Recap
Joe Sakic (2) – pp – 18:37		First period	02:46 – Keith Carney (1); 10:18 – Gary Suter (1); 17:28 – sh – Tony Amonte (4)
Valeri Kamensky (4) – 00:28; Joe Sakic (3) – 15:10		Second period	No scoring
Valeri Kamensky (5) – pp – 08:00; Claude Lemieux (5) – pp – 09:25; Adam Deadmarsh (1) – 17:00		Third period	No scoring
Patrick Roy 21 saves / 24 shots		Goalie stats	Jeff Hackett 23 saves / 29 shots

Colorado won series 4–2

==== (2) Dallas Stars vs. (7) Edmonton Oilers ====
This was the third playoff meeting between these two teams; with the teams splitting the two previous series. They last met in the 1991 Clarence Campbell Conference Final where the Minnesota North Stars defeated Edmonton in five games. This was the Oilers' last playoff series victory against the Stars until 2024 as they lost the next five series against Dallas.

April 16	Edmonton Oilers	3–5	Dallas Stars	Reunion Arena	Recap
Todd Marchant (1) – sh – 03:16; Kelly Buchberger (1) – 14:58		First period	12:24 – Joe Nieuwendyk (1); 12:54 – Jere Lehtinen (1)
No scoring		Second period	No scoring
Doug Weight (1) – 06:52		Third period	02:42 – Bob Bassen (1); 17:29 – Mike Modano (1); 18:57 – en – Brent Gilchrist (1)
Curtis Joseph 24 saves / 28 shots		Goalie stats	Andy Moog 20 saves / 23 shots

April 18	Edmonton Oilers	4–0	Dallas Stars	Reunion Arena	Recap
Mike Grier (1) – pp – 14:51		First period	No scoring
Mariusz Czerkawski (1) – 00:43		Second period	No scoring
Boris Mironov (1) – pp – 02:50; Ryan Smyth (1) – 07:07		Third period	No scoring
Curtis Joseph 25 saves / 25 shots		Goalie stats	Andy Moog 17 saves / 21 shots Arturs Irbe 4 saves / 4 shots

April 20	Dallas Stars	3–4	OT	Edmonton Oilers	Edmonton Coliseum	Recap
Mike Modano (2) – sh – 04:53; Benoit Hogue (1) – pp – 18:53		First period		No scoring
Joe Nieuwendyk (1) – 08:07		Second period		No scoring
No scoring		Third period		16:00 – Doug Weight (2); 17:44 – pp – Andrei Kovalenko (1); 17:56 – Mike Grier (2)
No scoring		First overtime period		09:15 – Kelly Buchberger (2)
Andy Moog 37 saves / 41 shots		Goalie stats		Curtis Joseph 39 saves / 42 shots

April 22	Dallas Stars	4–3	Edmonton Oilers	Edmonton Coliseum	Recap
Mike Modano (1) – pp – 13:15		First period	10:13 – pp –Andrei Kovalenko (1)
Dave Reid (1) – 02:20		Second period	08:23 – pp – Jason Arnott (1)
Brent Gilchrist (2) – 01:53; Jamie Langenbrunner (1) – 05:31		Third period	18:47 – Ryan Smyth (2)
Andy Moog 30 saves / 33 shots		Goalie stats	Curtis Joseph 26 saves / 30 shots

April 25	Edmonton Oilers	1–0	2OT	Dallas Stars	Reunion Arena	Recap
No scoring		First period		No scoring
No scoring		Second period		No scoring
No scoring		Third period		No scoring
Ryan Smyth (3) – 00:22		Second overtime period		No scoring
Curtis Joseph 43 saves / 43 shots		Goalie stats		Andy Moog 27 saves / 28 shots

April 27	Dallas Stars	3–2	Edmonton Oilers	Edmonton Coliseum	Recap
Jere Lehtinen (2) – 03:49		First period	13:25 – Mike Grier (3)
Bob Bassen (2) – 14:43		Second period	19:42 – Mariusz Czerkawski (2)
Mike Modano (4) – 14:42		Third period	No scoring
Andy Moog 33 saves / 35 shots		Goalie stats	Curtis Joseph 38 saves / 41 shots

April 29	Edmonton Oilers	4–3	OT	Dallas Stars	Reunion Arena	Recap
Rem Murray (1) – 01:45		First period		01:38 – Benoit Hogue (2)
Boris Mironov (2) – pp – 07:24; Andrei Kovalenko (3) – 19:40		Second period		11:22 – pp – Pat Verbeek (1); 13:27 – Bob Bassen (3)
No scoring		Third period		No scoring
Todd Marchant (2) – 12:26		First overtime period		No scoring
Curtis Joseph 38 saves / 41 shots		Goalie stats		Andy Moog 29 saves / 33 shots

Edmonton won series 4–3

==== (3) Detroit Red Wings vs. (6) St. Louis Blues ====
This was the second consecutive and fifth overall playoff meeting between these two teams; with the teams splitting the four previous series. Detroit won last year's Western Conference Semifinals in seven games. Game three was Craig McTavish's final game and the last NHL game ever with a helmetless player.

April 16	St. Louis Blues	2–0	Detroit Red Wings	Joe Louis Arena	Recap
Geoff Courtnall (1) – 12:44; Pierre Turgeon (1) – pp – 19:22		First period	No scoring
No scoring		Second period	No scoring
No scoring		Third period	No scoring
Grant Fuhr 30 saves / 30 shots		Goalie stats	Mike Vernon 25 saves / 27 shots

April 18	St. Louis Blues	1–2	Detroit Red Wings	Joe Louis Arena	Recap
Marc Bergevin (1) – 04:24		First period	No scoring
No scoring		Second period	No scoring
No scoring		Third period	04:05 – sh – Kris Draper (1); 07:09 – Larry Murphy (1)
Grant Fuhr 31 saves / 33 shots		Goalie stats	Mike Vernon 22 saves / 23 shots

April 20	Detroit Red Wings	3–2	St. Louis Blues	Kiel Center	Recap
Kris Draper (2) – 02:40		First period	17:09 – Brett Hull (1)
Brendan Shanahan (1) – pp – 00:39; Steve Yzerman (1) – pp – 15:22		Second period	06:36 – pp – Joe Murphy (1)
No scoring		Third period	No scoring
Mike Vernon 24 saves / 26 shots		Goalie stats	Grant Fuhr 26 saves / 29 shots

April 22	Detroit Red Wings	0–4	St. Louis Blues	Kiel Center	Recap
No scoring		First period	05:50 – Geoff Courtnall (2); 18:51 – Pavol Demitra (1)
No scoring		Second period	No scoring
No scoring		Third period	01:10 – pp – Geoff Courtnall (3); 09:23 – Chris Pronger (1)
Mike Vernon 19 saves / 23 shots Chris Osgood 4 saves / 4 shots		Goalie stats	Grant Fuhr 28 saves / 28 shots

April 25	St. Louis Blues	2–5	Detroit Red Wings	Joe Louis Arena	Recap
Al MacInnis (1) – pp – 11:02		First period	03:22 – Steve Yzerman (2)
Jim Campbell (1) – pp – 12:14		Second period	05:02 – pp – Vyacheslav Kozlov (1); 07:58 – Darren McCarty (1); 13:15 – Brendan Shanahan (2)
No scoring		Third period	06:32 – pp – Larry Murphy (2)
Grant Fuhr 28 saves / 33 shots		Goalie stats	Mike Vernon 19 saves / 21 shots

April 27	Detroit Red Wings	3–1	St. Louis Blues	Kiel Center	Recap
Vyacheslav Kozlov (2) – pp – 08:45		First period	02:12 – Brett Hull (2)
Brendan Shanahan (3) – pp – 01:07		Second period	No scoring
Kirk Maltby (1) – 08:24		Third period	No scoring
Mike Vernon 24 saves / 25 shots		Goalie stats	Grant Fuhr 27 saves / 30 shots

Detroit won series 4–2

==== (4) Mighty Ducks of Anaheim vs. (5) Phoenix Coyotes ====
This was the first and to date only playoff series between these two teams. This was the first time the cities of Anaheim and Phoenix were represented in the Stanley Cup playoffs.

April 16	Phoenix Coyotes	2–4	Mighty Ducks of Anaheim	Arrowhead Pond of Anaheim	Recap
No scoring		First period	08:57 – pp – Teemu Selanne (1); 16:01 – Paul Kariya (1)
Jeremy Roenick (1) – 03:27; Keith Tkachuk (1) – pp – 16:48		Second period	14:15 – Teemu Selanne (2)
No scoring		Third period	19:13 – en – Paul Kariya (2)
Nikolai Khabibulin 25 saves / 28 shots		Goalie stats	Guy Hebert 29 saves / 31 shots

April 18	Phoenix Coyotes	2–4	Mighty Ducks of Anaheim	Arrowhead Pond of Anaheim	Recap
Teppo Numminen (1) – pp – 09:23		First period	10:46 – pp – Dmitri Mironov (1)
No scoring		Second period	07:03 – pp – J. J. Daigneault (1)
Keith Tkachuk (2) – 03:55		Third period	13:26 – J. J. Daigneault (2); 19:53 – en – Teemu Selanne (3)
Nikolai Khabibulin 31 saves / 35 shots		Goalie stats	Guy Hebert 36 saves / 38 shots

April 20	Mighty Ducks of Anaheim	1–4	Phoenix Coyotes	America West Arena	Recap
Paul Kariya (3) – pp – 18:49		First period	01:18 – Darrin Shannon (1); 08:50 – Darrin Shannon; 14:01 – Keith Tkachuk (3)
No scoring		Second period	No scoring
No scoring		Third period	15:28 – Mike Gartner (1)
Guy Hebert 22 saves / 26 shots		Goalie stats	Nikolai Khabibulin 30 saves / 31 shots

April 22	Mighty Ducks of Anaheim	0–2	Phoenix Coyotes	America West Arena	Recap
No scoring		First period	No scoring
No scoring		Second period	No scoring
No scoring		Third period	12:45 – Bob Corkum (1); 19:54 – en – Teppo Numminen (2)
Guy Hebert 23 saves / 24 shots		Goalie stats	Nikolai Khabibulin 32 saves / 32 shots

April 24	Phoenix Coyotes	5–2	Mighty Ducks of Anaheim	Arrowhead Pond of Anaheim	Recap
Keith Tkachuk (4) – 14:46		First period	17:37 – Teemu Selanne (4)
Jeremy Roenick (2) – 07:17; Teppo Numminen (3) – 09:12		Second period	No scoring
Bob Corkum (2) – 14:10; Keith Tkachuk (5) – en – 19:39		Third period	06:52 – pp – Teemu Selanne (5)
Nikolai Khabibulin 30 saves / 32 shots		Goalie stats	Guy Hebert 19 saves / 23 shots

April 27	Mighty Ducks of Anaheim	3–2	OT	Phoenix Coyotes	America West Arena	Recap
No scoring		First period		No scoring
Paul Kariya (4) – pp – 06:12; Brian Bellows (1) – 19:01		Second period		No scoring
No scoring		Third period		09:00 – Darrin Shannon (3); 17:44 – pp – Keith Tkachuk (6)
Paul Kariya (5) – 07:29		First overtime period		No scoring
Guy Hebert 19 saves / 21 shots		Goalie stats		Nikolai Khabibulin 36 saves / 39 shots

April 29	Phoenix Coyotes	0–3	Mighty Ducks of Anaheim	Arrowhead Pond of Anaheim	Recap
No scoring		First period	03:11 – Dave Karpa (1)
No scoring		Second period	03:12 – Steve Rucchin (1); 08:19 – Joe Sacco (1)
No scoring		Third period	No scoring
Nikolai Khabibulin 23 saves / 26 shots		Goalie stats	Guy Hebert 31 saves / 31 shots

Anaheim won series 4–3

== Conference semifinals ==
=== Eastern Conference semifinals ===
==== (1) New Jersey Devils vs. (5) New York Rangers ====
This was the third playoff meeting between these two teams; with New York winning both previous series. They last met in the 1994 Eastern Conference Finals, where New York won in seven games.

May 2	New York Rangers	0–2	New Jersey Devils	Continental Airlines Arena	Recap
No scoring		First period	No scoring
No scoring		Second period	13:45 – pp – Scott Niedermayer (2)
No scoring		Third period	19:56 – en – John MacLean (4)
Mike Richter 32 saves / 33 shots		Goalie stats	Martin Brodeur 21 saves / 21 shots

May 4	New York Rangers	2–0	New Jersey Devils	Continental Airlines Arena	Recap
Brian Leetch (1) – pp – 18:21		First period	No scoring
No scoring		Second period	No scoring
Russ Courtnall (1) – en – 19:15		Third period	No scoring
Mike Richter 32 saves / 32 shots		Goalie stats	Martin Brodeur 20 saves / 21 shots

May 6	New Jersey Devils	2–3	New York Rangers	Madison Square Garden	Recap
Randy McKay (1) – 06:04		First period	03:57 – Wayne Gretzky (5); 05:24 – Esa Tikkanen (4)
Steve Thomas (1) – 07:26		Second period	06:41 – pp – Esa Tikkanen (5)
No scoring		Third period	No scoring
Martin Brodeur 23 saves / 26 shots		Goalie stats	Mike Richter 33 saves / 35 shots

May 8	New Jersey Devils	0–3	New York Rangers	Madison Square Garden	Recap
No scoring		First period	05:49 – pp – Adam Graves (1)
No scoring		Second period	14:36 – Wayne Gretzky (6)
No scoring		Third period	19:02 – en – Esa Tikkanen (6)
Martin Brodeur 25 saves / 27 shots		Goalie stats	Mike Richter 35 saves / 35 shots

May 11	New York Rangers	2–1	OT	New Jersey Devils	Continental Airlines Arena	Recap
Esa Tikkanen (7) – 07:53		First period		No scoring
No scoring		Second period		12:02 – pp – Brian Rolston (4)
No scoring		Third period		No scoring
Adam Graves (2) – 14:08		First overtime period		No scoring
Mike Richter 46 saves / 47 shots		Goalie stats		Martin Brodeur 29 saves / 31 shots

New York won series 4–1

==== (2) Buffalo Sabres vs. (3) Philadelphia Flyers ====
This was the fourth playoff meeting between these two teams; with Philadelphia winning all three previous series. They last met in the 1995 Eastern Conference Quarterfinals, where Philadelphia won in five games.

May 3	Philadelphia Flyers	5–3	Buffalo Sabres	Marine Midland Arena	Recap
No scoring		First period	No scoring
Dan Kordic (1) – 11:23; Mikael Renberg (2) – pp – 19:59		Second period	05:10 – Michal Grosek (1); 06:00 – Brad May (1); 17:26 – pp – Donald Audette (3)
Rod Brind'Amour (4) – 10:00; Shjon Podein (2) – 19:12; Rod Brind'Amour (5) – en – 19:54		Third period	No scoring
Garth Snow 29 saves / 32 shots		Goalie stats	Steve Shields 42 saves / 46 shots

May 5	Philadelphia Flyers	2–1	Buffalo Sabres	Marine Midland Arena	Recap
Mikael Renberg (3) – 04:47; Chris Therien (1) – 16:49		First period	No scoring
No scoring		Second period	18:18 – Jason Dawe (2)
No scoring		Third period	No scoring
Garth Snow 29 saves / 30 shots		Goalie stats	Steve Shields 35 saves / 37 shots

May 7	Buffalo Sabres	1–4	Philadelphia Flyers	CoreStates Center	Recap
Darryl Shannon (2) – pp – 14:55		First period	08:18 – pp – Eric Lindros (4); 11:51 – pp – Dale Hawerchuk (1); 18:57 – Rod Brind'Amour (6)
No scoring		Second period	No scoring
No scoring		Third period	19:48 – en – Eric Desjardins (1)
Steve Shields 34 saves / 37 shots		Goalie stats	Garth Snow 15 saves / 16 shots

May 9	Buffalo Sabres	5–4	OT	Philadelphia Flyers	CoreStates Center	Recap
Donald Audette (2) – pp – 04:27		First period		10:15 – pp – Dainius Zubrus (2)
No scoring		Second period		01:03 – Dale Hawerchuk (2)
Derek Plante (4) – pp – 03:34; Michal Grosek (2) – 04:28; Dixon Ward (2) – sh – 11:53		Third period		05:28 – Trent Klatt (3); 13:26 – Mikael Renberg (4)
Ed Ronan (1) – 06:24		First overtime period		No scoring
Steve Shields 39 saves / 43 shots		Goalie stats		Garth Snow 20 saves / 25 shots

May 11	Philadelphia Flyers	6–3	Buffalo Sabres	Marine Midland Arena	Recap
No scoring		First period	No scoring
John LeClair (5) – 05:27; Eric Lindros (5) – 08:32; Eric Lindros (6) – 09:13; Dainius Zubrus (3) – 14:51		Second period	10:07 – Michal Grosek (3); 14:19 – pp – Randy Burridge (4); 19:59 – pp – Randy Burridge (5)
Shjon Podein (3) – 06:00; Dainius Zubrus (4) – en – 19:48		Third period	No scoring
Ron Hextall 21 saves / 24 shots		Goalie stats	Steve Shields 34 saves / 39 shots

Philadelphia won series 4–1

=== Western Conference semifinals ===
==== (1) Colorado Avalanche vs. (7) Edmonton Oilers ====
This was the first playoff meeting between the Avalanche and Oilers. The Avalanche defeated the Oilers in five games to return to the Western Conference Finals for the second year in a row.

May 2	Edmonton Oilers	1–5	Colorado Avalanche	McNichols Sports Arena	Recap
No scoring		First period	03:10 – Eric Lacroix (1); 09:08 – Claude Lemieux (6)
Kelly Buchberger (3) – 04:00		Second period	12:28 – Peter Forsberg (3); 16:16 – Sandis Ozolinsh (3)
No scoring		Third period	06:39 – pp – Peter Forsberg (4)
Curtis Joseph 32 saves / 37 shots		Goalie stats	Patrick Roy 35 saves / 36 shots

May 4	Edmonton Oilers	1–4	Colorado Avalanche	McNichols Sports Arena	Recap
No scoring		First period	13:52 – pp – Scott Young (1)
Doug Weight (3) – 04:19		Second period	06:39 – Valeri Kamensky (6); 11:35 – pp – Claude Lemieux (7)
No scoring		Third period	09:51 – Rene Corbet (2)
Curtis Joseph 20 saves / 24 shots		Goalie stats	Patrick Roy 42 saves / 43 shots

May 7	Colorado Avalanche	3–4	Edmonton Oilers	Edmonton Coliseum	Recap
Peter Forsberg (5) – 02:25		First period	03:20 – Kelly Buchberger (4); 19:48 – Jason Arnott (2)
Valeri Kamensky (7) – pp – 07:29; Claude Lemieux (8) – 11:24		Second period	No scoring
No scoring		Third period	13:57 – Kelly Buchberger (5); 16:15 – Ryan Smyth (4)
Patrick Roy 34 saves / 38 shots		Goalie stats	Curtis Joseph 21 saves / 24 shots

May 9	Colorado Avalanche	3–2	OT	Edmonton Oilers	Edmonton Coliseum	Recap
Valeri Kamensky (8) – 03:06		First period		No scoring
Sandis Ozolinsh (4) – pp – 18:40		Second period		07:08 – sh – Todd Marchant (3); 12:47 – pp – Ryan Smyth (5)
No scoring		Third period		No scoring
Claude Lemieux (9) – 08:35		First overtime period		No scoring
Patrick Roy 27 saves / 29 shots		Goalie stats		Curtis Joseph 38 saves / 41 shots

May 11	Edmonton Oilers	3–4	Colorado Avalanche	McNichols Sports Arena	Recap
No scoring		First period	13:56 – Joe Sakic (4)
Todd Marchant (4) – sh – 09:38; Jason Arnott (3) – 17:52		Second period	04:56 – Adam Deadmarsh (2)
Andrei Kovalenko (4) – pp – 13:49		Third period	00:35 – Claude Lemieux (10); 18:52 – pp – Adam Deadmarsh (3)
Curtis Joseph 25 saves / 29 shots		Goalie stats	Patrick Roy 26 saves / 29 shots

Colorado won series 4–1

==== (3) Detroit Red Wings vs. (4) Mighty Ducks of Anaheim ====
This was the first playoff meeting between the Red Wings and Ducks. The Red Wings swept the Ducks to return to the Western Conference Finals for the third year in a row.

Despite ending in a sweep, three of the four games played required at least one overtime period, the longest being Game 2 which went into triple overtime.

May 2	Mighty Ducks of Anaheim	1–2	OT	Detroit Red Wings	Joe Louis Arena	Recap
No scoring		First period		No scoring
Paul Kariya (6) – pp – 19:00		Second period		No scoring
No scoring		Third period		11:01 – Sergei Fedorov (1)
No scoring		First overtime period		00:59 – Martin Lapointe (1)
Guy Hebert 28 saves / 30 shots		Goalie stats		Mike Vernon 19 saves / 20 shots

May 4	Mighty Ducks of Anaheim	2–3	3OT	Detroit Red Wings	Joe Louis Arena	Recap
No scoring		First period		No scoring
No scoring		Second period		04:34 – Steve Yzerman (3)
Jari Kurri (1) – 04:18; Teemu Selanne (6) – 16:53		Third period		12:14 – Doug Brown (1)
No scoring		Third overtime period		01:31 – pp – Vyacheslav Kozlov (3)
Guy Hebert 30 saves / 31 shots Mikhail Shtalenkov 38 saves / 40 shots		Goalie stats		Mike Vernon 49 saves / 51 shots

May 6	Detroit Red Wings	5–3	Mighty Ducks of Anaheim	Arrowhead Pond of Anaheim	Recap
Vyacheslav Kozlov (4) – pp – 15:47		First period	11:19 – pp – Paul Kariya (7); 12:09 – pp – Teemu Selanne (7)
Igor Larionov (1) – pp – 13:03; Doug Brown (2) – 16:28		Second period	05:12 – Ted Drury (1)
Sergei Fedorov (2) – 03:34; Vyacheslav Kozlov (5) – 03:58		Third period	No scoring
Mike Vernon 20 saves / 23 shots		Goalie stats	Mikhail Shtalenkov 44 saves / 49 shots

May 8	Detroit Red Wings	3–2	2OT	Mighty Ducks of Anaheim	Arrowhead Pond of Anaheim	Recap
Doug Brown (3) – 18:25		First period		03:01 – Joe Sacco (2)
No scoring		Second period		15:23 – pp – Brian Bellows (2)
Nicklas Lidstrom (1) – 09:09		Third period		No scoring
Brendan Shanahan (4) – 17:03		Second overtime period		No scoring
Mike Vernon 35 saves / 37 shots		Goalie stats		Mikhail Shtalenkov 70 saves / 73 shots

Detroit won series 4–0

== Conference finals ==
=== Eastern Conference final ===
==== (3) Philadelphia Flyers vs. (5) New York Rangers ====
This was the tenth playoff meeting between these two teams, with Philadelphia having won five of the nine previous series. Their most recent meeting was in the 1995 Eastern Conference Semifinals, which Philadelphia won in four games. The Rangers made their fourth semifinal/conference final appearance since the league began using a 16-team or greater playoff format in 1980 and first since defeating New Jersey in seven games in 1994. Philadelphia made their sixth semifinal/conference final appearance in that same time and first since losing to New Jersey in six games in 1995.

New York outshot Philadelphia in Game 1 25–21, but the Flyers ended up winning 3–1. Wayne Gretzky had his second hat trick of the playoffs in Game 2 as the Rangers edged the Flyers 5–4. With the series tied at 1–1, the two teams moved to Madison Square Garden in New York for Games 3 and 4. This time, it was the Flyers' Eric Lindros who scored a hat-trick as Philadelphia won 6–3. In Game 4, Lindros broke a 2–2 tie with just seven seconds remaining in regulation, and the Flyers won 3–2. The Rangers scored twice in 26 seconds in the first period to take a 2–1 lead. The Flyers scored three unanswered goals and won the game 4–2 and the series 4–1. This was the last playoff game for both Gretzky and Mark Messier, as neither of the players' teams made the post-season for the rest of their careers.

May 16	New York Rangers	1–3	Philadelphia Flyers	CoreStates Center	Recap
No scoring		First period	02:28 – Dainius Zubrus (5); 04:39 – pp – Janne Niinimaa (1)
No scoring		Second period	No scoring
Luc Robitaille (4) – 19:50		Third period	08:34 – Eric Lindros (6)
Mike Richter 18 saves / 21 shots		Goalie stats	Garth Snow 24 saves / 25 shots

May 18	New York Rangers	5–4	Philadelphia Flyers	CoreStates Center	Recap
Doug Lidster (1) – 05:09; Wayne Gretzky (7) – pp – 07:35; Wayne Gretzky (8) – pp – 09:34		First period	04:11 – pp – John LeClair (6)
Wayne Gretzky (9) – 09:30; Mark Messier (3) – 13:45		Second period	06:45 – Paul Coffey (1); 07:34 – Rod Brind'Amour (7); 15:11 – Shjon Podein (4)
No scoring		Third period	No scoring
Mike Richter 25 saves / 29 shots		Goalie stats	Garth Snow 5 saves / 10 shots Ron Hextall 12 saves / 12 shots

May 20	Philadelphia Flyers	6–3	New York Rangers	Madison Square Garden	Recap
Eric Lindros (7) – 07:33; Petr Svoboda (1) – 12:03		First period	No scoring
No scoring		Second period	No scoring
Eric Lindros (8) – 06:35; Trent Klatt (4) – 14:59; Rod Brind'Amour (8) – 16:52; Eric Lindros (9) – en – 19:22		Third period	00:43 – pp – Russ Courtnall (2); 04:02 – Russ Courtnall (3); 14:21 – Wayne Gretzky (10)
Ron Hextall 25 saves / 28 shots		Goalie stats	Mike Richter 19 saves / 24 shots

May 23	Philadelphia Flyers	3–2	New York Rangers	Madison Square Garden	Recap
Mikael Renberg (5) – pp – 07:08		First period	No scoring
No scoring		Second period	No scoring
John Druce (1) – sh – 16:47; Eric Lindros (10) – pp – 19:53		Third period	01:41 – sh – Esa Tikkanen (8); 17:52 – Brian Leetch (2)
Ron Hextall 31 saves / 33 shots		Goalie stats	Mike Richter 39 saves / 42 shots

May 25	New York Rangers	2–4	Philadelphia Flyers	CoreStates Center	Recap
Alexander Karpovtsev (1) – pp – 12:30; Esa Tikkanen (9) – pp – 12:56		First period	05:18 – pp – Eric Lindros (11); 15:53 – pp – John LeClair (7); 19:06 – Rod Brind'Amour (9)
No scoring		Second period	No scoring
No scoring		Third period	06:43 – Rod Brind'Amour (10)
Mike Richter 25 saves / 29 shots		Goalie stats	Ron Hextall 17 saves / 19 shots

Philadelphia won series 4–1

=== Western Conference final ===
==== (1) Colorado Avalanche vs. (3) Detroit Red Wings ====
This was the second playoff meeting between these two teams, with Colorado winning the only previous series. This was a rematch of the previous season's Western Conference Final, which Colorado won in six games. This was Detroit's third straight and fifth overall Conference Finals appearance, while it was Colorado's fourth trip to the Conference Finals. The rivalry between the two teams was as heated as ever after the events of a brawl during a game on March 26 still fresh.

The Red Wings played a determined Game 1 as Brendan Shanahan broke a scoreless tie at 1:13 of the third period to give Detroit a 1–0 lead. Joe Sakic scored just 27 seconds later and Mike Ricci added another at 6:13 gave Colorado a 2–1 lead that they would not relinquish. In Game 2, Colorado led 2–0 but Detroit pulled to within one on a power-play goal by Igor Larionov at 16:51 of the second period. The Red Wings then went on to score three times in the third period to win 4–2 and tie the series at one game apiece. In Game 3, the Red Wings got two goals from Vyacheslav Kozlov and went on to win 2–1. Detroit also won Game 4, 6–0. Red Wings goaltender Mike Vernon made 19 saves in the shutout and Igor Larionov and Kirk Maltby both scored twice. Detroit now led the series three games to one. Embarrassed and frustrated after such a lopsided loss in Game 4, Colorado came right back in Game 5 with a 6–0 win of their own, with Patrick Roy stopping all 32 shots he faced. Claude Lemieux and Joe Sakic both scored two goals in the victory. In Game 6, the Red Wings looked to close out the series. Sergei Fedorov's goal at 6:11 of the third period gave Detroit a 2–0 lead. Scott Young pulled Colorado to within one on a goal at 14:48, but the Avalanche could not score the equalizer, and Brendan Shanahan sealed the game and series for Detroit with an empty net goal at 19:30.

May 15	Detroit Red Wings	1–2	Colorado Avalanche	McNichols Sports Arena	Recap
No scoring		First period	No scoring
No scoring		Second period	No scoring
Brendan Shanahan (5) – 01:13		Third period	01:40 – Joe Sakic (5); 06:13 – Mike Ricci (2)
Mike Vernon 17 saves / 19 shots		Goalie stats	Patrick Roy 34 saves / 35 shots

May 17	Detroit Red Wings	4–2	Colorado Avalanche	McNichols Sports Arena	Recap
No scoring		First period	18:37 – pp – Scott Young (2)
Igor Larionov (2) – pp – 16:51		Second period	16:09 – Claude Lemieux (11)
Sergei Fedorov (3) – pp – 02:10; Steve Yzerman (4) – 16:00; Darren McCarty (2) – 18:43		Third period	No scoring
Mike Vernon 15 saves / 17 shots		Goalie stats	Patrick Roy 36 saves / 40 shots

May 19	Colorado Avalanche	1–2	Detroit Red Wings	Joe Louis Arena	Recap
No scoring		First period	01:12 – Vyacheslav Kozlov (6)
Joe Sakic (6) – pp – 14:47		Second period	No scoring
No scoring		Third period	08:20 – Vyacheslav Kozlov (7)
Patrick Roy 26 saves / 28 shots		Goalie stats	Mike Vernon 27 saves / 28 shots

May 22	Colorado Avalanche	0–6	Detroit Red Wings	Joe Louis Arena	Recap
No scoring		First period	01:52 – pp – Igor Larionov (3); 07:15 – Igor Larionov (4)
No scoring		Second period	12:24 – Vyacheslav Kozlov (8); 16:54 – pp – Sergei Fedorov (4); 19:13 – Kirk Maltby (2)
No scoring		Third period	05:25 – Kirk Maltby (3)
Patrick Roy 20 saves / 25 shots Craig Billington 12 saves / 13 shots		Goalie stats	Mike Vernon 19 saves / 19 shots

May 24	Detroit Red Wings	0–6	Colorado Avalanche	McNichols Sports Arena	Recap
No scoring		First period	06:46 – Claude Lemieux (12); 11:04 – Claude Lemieux (13); 15:34 – Joe Sakic (7)
No scoring		Second period	02:23 – Stephane Yelle (1); 10:57 – Joe Sakic (8); 18:04 – Scott Young (3)
No scoring		Third period	No scoring
Mike Vernon 7 saves / 11 shots Chris Osgood 15 saves / 17 shots		Goalie stats	Patrick Roy 32 saves / 32 shots

May 26	Colorado Avalanche	1–3	Detroit Red Wings	Joe Louis Arena	Recap
No scoring		First period	No scoring
No scoring		Second period	03:29 – Martin Lapointe (2)
Scott Young (4) – 14:48		Third period	06:11 – Sergei Fedorov (5); 19:30 – en – Brendan Shanahan (6)
Patrick Roy 39 saves / 41 shots		Goalie stats	Mike Vernon 15 saves / 16 shots

Detroit won series 4–2

== Stanley Cup Final ==
This was the first and to date only playoff series between these two teams. Detroit made their twentieth appearance in the Finals and second in the past three years. Their last appearance was in 1995, where they were upset by the New Jersey Devils in a sweep. Philadelphia made their seventh appearance in the Finals and first since 1987 when they lost to the Edmonton Oilers in seven games. Detroit last won the Stanley Cup in 1955, while Philadelphia last won the Stanley Cup in 1975. The Red Wings swept the Flyers to win their first Stanley Cup since 1955 and eighth overall, ending what was the longest Stanley Cup title drought in the league at that time.

With the loss, the Flyers' record in the Stanley Cup Final fell to 2-5. The Red Wings would win the Stanley Cup three more times after this in 1998, 2002, and 2008. The 1997 Stanley Cup Final began a streak of playoff success for Detroit-based teams over their Philadelphia counterparts. After the Red Wings' victory, the NBA's Detroit Pistons would defeat the Philadelphia 76ers in the NBA playoffs in 2003, 2005, and 2008.

May 31	Detroit Red Wings	4–2	Philadelphia Flyers	CoreStates Center	Recap
Kirk Maltby (4) – sh – 06:38; Joe Kocur (1) – 15:56		First period	07:37 – pp – Rod Brind'Amour (11)
Sergei Fedorov (6) – 11:41		Second period	17:11 – John LeClair (8)
Steve Yzerman (5) – 00:56		Third period	No scoring
Mike Vernon 26 saves / 28 shots		Goalie stats	Ron Hextall 26 saves / 30 shots

June 3	Detroit Red Wings	4–2	Philadelphia Flyers	CoreStates Center	Recap
Brendan Shanahan (7) – 01:37; Steve Yzerman (6) – pp – 09:22		First period	17:42 – pp – Rod Brind'Amour (12); 18:58 – pp – Rod Brind'Amour (13)
Kirk Maltby (5) – 02:39		Second period	No scoring
Brendan Shanahan (8) – 09:56		Third period	No scoring
Mike Vernon 29 saves / 31 shots		Goalie stats	Garth Snow 24 saves / 28 shots

June 5	Philadelphia Flyers	1–6	Detroit Red Wings	Joe Louis Arena	Recap
John LeClair (9) – pp – 07:03		First period	09:03 – pp – Steve Yzerman (7); 11:05 – Sergei Fedorov (7); 19:00 – Martin Lapointe (3)
No scoring		Second period	03:12 – pp – Sergei Fedorov (8); 19:17 – Brendan Shanahan (9)
No scoring		Third period	01:08 – pp – Martin Lapointe (4)
Ron Hextall 23 saves / 29 shots		Goalie stats	Mike Vernon 21 saves / 22 shots

June 7	Philadelphia Flyers	1–2	Detroit Red Wings	Joe Louis Arena	Recap
No scoring		First period	19:27 – Nicklas Lidstrom (2)
No scoring		Second period	13:02 – Darren McCarty (3)
Eric Lindros (12) – 19:45		Third period	No scoring
Ron Hextall 26 saves / 28 shots		Goalie stats	Mike Vernon 26 saves / 27 shots

Detroit won series 4–0

== Playoff statistics ==
=== Skaters ===
These are the top ten skaters based on points.

Player	Team	GP	G	A	Pts	+/–	PIM
Eric Lindros	Philadelphia Flyers	19	12	14	26	+7	40
Joe Sakic	Colorado Avalanche	17	8	17	25	+5	14
Claude Lemieux	Colorado Avalanche	17	13	10	23	+7	32
Valeri Kamensky	Colorado Avalanche	17	8	14	22	-1	16
Rod Brind'Amour	Philadelphia Flyers	19	13	8	21	+9	10
John LeClair	Philadelphia Flyers	19	9	12	21	+5	10
Wayne Gretzky	New York Rangers	15	10	10	20	+5	2
Sergei Fedorov	Detroit Red Wings	20	8	12	20	+5	12
Brendan Shanahan	Detroit Red Wings	20	9	8	17	+8	43
Peter Forsberg	Colorado Avalanche	14	5	12	17	-6	10

=== Goaltenders ===
This is a combined table of the top five goaltenders based on goals against average and the top five goaltenders based on save percentage, with at least 420 minutes played. The table is sorted by GAA, and the criteria for inclusion are bolded.

Player	Team	GP	W	L	SA	GA	GAA	SV%	SO	TOI
Martin Brodeur	New Jersey Devils	10	5	5	268	19	**1.73**	**.929**	2	658:48
Mike Vernon	Detroit Red Wings	20	16	4	494	36	**1.76**	.927	1	1229:12
Ron Tugnutt	Ottawa Senators	7	3	4	169	14	**1.98**	.917	1	424:37
Guy Hebert	Mighty Ducks of Anaheim	9	4	4	255	18	**2.02**	**.929**	1	533:31
Mike Richter	New York Rangers	15	9	6	488	33	**2.11**	**.932**	3	938:39

== See also ==
- List of Stanley Cup champions
- 1996 NHL entry draft
- 47th National Hockey League All-Star Game
- NHL All-Star Game
- NHL All-Rookie Team
- 1997 in sports
- 1996–97 NHL season

Preceded by 1996 Stanley Cup playoffs	Stanley Cup playoffs	Succeeded by 1998 Stanley Cup playoffs
