= Joé Juneau =

Canadian ice hockey player (born 1968)

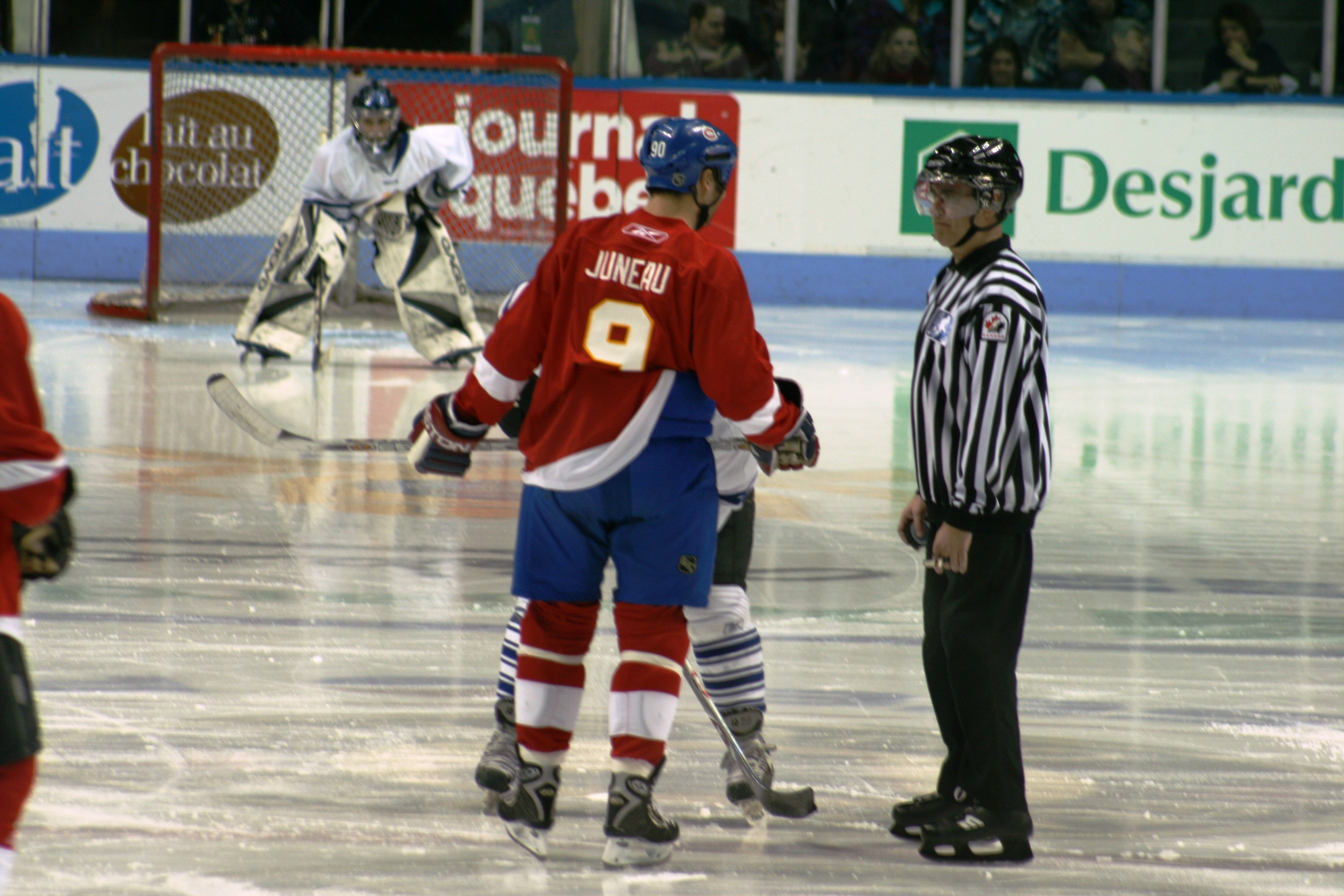
- Juneau in 2009
- Born: January 5, 1968 (age 58) Pont-Rouge, Quebec, Canada
- Height: 6 ft 0 in (183 cm)
- Weight: 195 lb (88 kg; 13 st 13 lb)
- Position: Centre
- Shot: Left
- Played for: Boston Bruins; Washington Capitals; Buffalo Sabres; Ottawa Senators; Phoenix Coyotes; Montreal Canadiens
- National team: Canada
- NHL draft: 81st overall, 1988; Boston Bruins
- Playing career: 1991–2004
Medal record
Men's Ice hockey
Silver medal – second place	1992 Albertville	Ice hockey

Joseph Juneau (French pronunciation: [ʒoe ʒyno]) (born January 5, 1968) is a Canadian former professional hockey player born in Pont-Rouge, Quebec. He played in the National Hockey League for the Boston Bruins, Washington Capitals, Buffalo Sabres, Ottawa Senators, Phoenix Coyotes and the Montreal Canadiens.

== Early life ==
Juneau, according to his mother, was on skates when he was one year old. His father built a small sheet of ice behind their home in Pont-Rouge, a small village near Quebec City.

As a youth, Juneau played in the 1979, 1980 and 1981 Quebec International Pee-Wee Hockey Tournaments with a minor ice hockey team from Pont-Rouge. Juneau was a star college hockey player at Rensselaer Polytechnic Institute, where he scored 71 goals in four regular seasons and was a two-time All-American selection. He was well known for having a 4.0 grade point average and earning a degree in just three years in aeronautical engineering. He was inducted into the Athletic Hall of Fame in 2005.

== Professional career ==
Juneau was drafted by the Bruins in the fourth round of the 1988 NHL entry draft. However, he got into a dispute with the team over his contract. The sticking point was Juneau's insistence on being paid full salary even if he was sent to the minors, a demand Boston refused. As such, Juneau spent a year with the Canadian Olympic team while disputing his contract offer from the Bruins. He led Canada to a silver medal at the 1992 Albertville Games and was the tournament's leading scorer with six goals and nine assists for 15 points.

Juneau would eventually sign with Boston on the team's terms. Juneau joined the Bruins' NHL roster right after the Olympics, and never spent a day in the minor leagues during his career. Juneau played the last fourteen games of the 1991–92 season, recording his five goals and 14 assists. In the Stanley Cup playoffs that year, Juneau had four goals and eight assists as the Bruins lost in the third round to Pittsburgh. His best season was his rookie year of the 1992–93 season with the Bruins, when, as the left winger on a powerful line with Adam Oates and Cam Neely, he had 32 goals and 102 points and set the NHL record for assists in a season by a left wing with 70, a mark Juneau held until 2022, when it was passed by Jonathan Huberdeau of the Florida Panthers. He was only the fourth rookie to record 100 points in a season. He was named to the NHL All-Rookie team for his efforts.

In the middle of the 1993–94 season on March 21, 1994, the Bruins traded Juneau to the Capitals for Al Iafrate in a move that Capitals GM David Poile stated was a move for wanting to go for offense, while the Bruins could not resist in pairing Iafrate and his slapshot with Ray Bourque for the backline (as it turned out, Iafrate played in twelve games for Boston along with the playoffs before injuries knocked him out for the next two years). In Game 4 of the 1996 Eastern Conference quarterfinals against Pittsburgh, he became the first player ever to be awarded a penalty shot in overtime in a Stanley Cup playoff game during the second overtime. Juneau's shot against goaltender Ken Wregget missed and the game ultimately ended in the fourth overtime with Pittsburgh prevailing. Juneau proved to be a key part of the Capitals run in the 1998 Stanley Cup playoffs, which saw him score seventeen points in 21 playoff games, with the biggest goal coming in Game 6 of the Eastern Conference Finals against the Buffalo Sabres in overtime to send the Capitals to their first ever Stanley Cup Final.

The following year, with the Capitals out of contention and Juneau set to become a free agent, he requested a trade to a contender, and the Capitals found a willing trade partner with the Buffalo Sabres, who desired offense. They traded Alexei Tezikov and future considerations to get Juneau (alongside a third-round pick in the 1999 draft). He recorded one goal for the Sabres in the regular season before suffering a concussion that knocked him out for the first game of the playoffs. He recorded 11 points in the playoffs as the Sabres reached the Stanley Cup Final, where they lost in six games.

On October 25, 1999, Juneau signed a one-year contract with the Ottawa Senators (with options for a second year), who signed him largely to fill the offensive gap created when Alexei Yashin was engaged in a hold-out and Daniel Alfredsson suffered a torn MCL injury.

Juneau's offensive numbers steadily declined, largely due to chronic injuries. He became a journeyman, playing for five teams in four seasons before settling with the Montreal Canadiens as a third-liner for the final three seasons of his career. He announced his retirement on May 1, 2004, two days after the 2004 Stanley Cup playoffs ended for the Canadiens. Juneau finished with 156 goals and 416 assists for 572 points over thirteen seasons.

== Post-retirement ==
After his playing career, Juneau became a partner and account manager at Quebec City-based Harfan Technologies. Rensselaer awarded Juneau an honorary degree at the school's 2005 commencement ceremonies, then named him as the second inductee into the Rensselaer "Ring of Honor" in November. Between 2005 and 2007, Juneau moved to Fairbanks, Alaska, where he helped promote hockey to the youth in the area before moving to Kuujjuaq, Quebec, on a permanent basis. He established the Northern Youth Hockey Development Program, that offered itself to Inuit youth in northern Quebec. His involvement with the Nunavik hockey program ended in 2017.

== Career statistics ==
=== Regular season and playoffs ===
			Regular season					Playoffs
Season	Team	League	GP	G	A	Pts	PIM	GP	G	A	Pts	PIM
1985–86	Cégep de Lévis-Lauzon	CEGEP	—	21	47	68	—	—	—	—	—	—
1986–87	Cégep de Lévis-Lauzon	CEGEP	38	27	57	84	—	—	—	—	—	—
1987–88	R.P.I. Engineers	ECAC	31	16	29	45	18	—	—	—	—	—
1988–89	R.P.I. Engineers	ECAC	30	12	23	35	40	—	—	—	—	—
1989–90	R.P.I. Engineers	ECAC	34	18	52	70	31	—	—	—	—	—
1989–90	Canada	Intl	3	0	2	2	4	—	—	—	—	—
1990–91	R.P.I. Engineers	ECAC	29	23	40	63	68	—	—	—	—	—
1990–91	Canada	Intl	7	2	3	5	0	—	—	—	—	—
1991–92	Canada	Intl	60	20	49	69	35	—	—	—	—	—
1991–92	Boston Bruins	NHL	14	5	14	19	4	15	4	8	12	21
1992–93	Boston Bruins	NHL	84	32	70	102	33	4	2	4	6	6
1993–94	Boston Bruins	NHL	63	14	58	72	35	—	—	—	—	—
1993–94	Washington Capitals	NHL	11	5	8	13	6	11	4	5	9	6
1994–95	Washington Capitals	NHL	44	5	38	43	8	7	2	6	8	2
1995–96	Washington Capitals	NHL	80	14	50	64	30	5	0	7	7	6
1996–97	Washington Capitals	NHL	58	15	27	42	8	—	—	—	—	—
1997–98	Washington Capitals	NHL	56	9	22	31	26	21	7	10	17	8
1998–99	Washington Capitals	NHL	63	14	27	41	20	—	—	—	—	—
1998–99	Buffalo Sabres	NHL	9	1	1	2	2	20	3	8	11	10
1999–2000	Ottawa Senators	NHL	65	13	24	37	22	6	2	1	3	0
2000–01	Phoenix Coyotes	NHL	69	10	23	33	28	—	—	—	—	—
2001–02	Montreal Canadiens	NHL	70	8	28	36	10	12	1	4	5	6
2002–03	Montreal Canadiens	NHL	72	6	16	22	20	—	—	—	—	—
2003–04	Montreal Canadiens	NHL	70	5	10	15	20	11	0	1	1	4
NHL totals			828	156	416	572	272	112	25	54	79	69

=== International ===
Year	Team	Event	GP	G	A	Pts	PIM
1992	Canada	OG	8	6	9	15	4
Senior totals			8	6	9	15	4

== See also ==
- List of NHL players with 100-point seasons

== Awards and honors ==
Award	Year
All-ECAC Hockey Rookie Team	1987–88
All-ECAC Hockey First Team	1989–90
AHCA East First-Team All-American	1989–90
All-ECAC Hockey Second Team	1990–91
AHCA East Second-Team All-American	1990–91
Knight of the National Order of Quebec	2014
NCAA Silver Anniversary Award	2016
