= Bob Corkum =

American ice hockey player and coach

Robert Corkum
- Born: December 18, 1967 (age 58) Salisbury, Massachusetts, U.S.
- Height: 6 ft 2 in (188 cm)
- Weight: 230 lb (104 kg; 16 st 6 lb)
- Position: Center
- Shot: Right
- Played for: Buffalo Sabres; Mighty Ducks of Anaheim; Philadelphia Flyers; Phoenix Coyotes; Los Angeles Kings; New Jersey Devils; Atlanta Thrashers
- NHL draft: 47th overall, 1986; Buffalo Sabres
- Playing career: 1989–2002

Robert Freeman Corkum (born December 18, 1967) is an American professional ice hockey coach and former ice hockey center. He was drafted in the third round, 47th overall, by the Buffalo Sabres in the 1986 NHL entry draft.

== Playing career ==
Corkum represented the United States at the 1987 World Junior Ice Hockey Championships. After playing four seasons for the University of Maine, Corkum debuted with Buffalo's American Hockey League affiliate, the Rochester Americans, in the 1989–90 season. He also appeared in eight regular season games and five playoff games with the Sabres during the 1989–90 season. After playing for the Americans and Sabres for the next three seasons, Corkum was chosen by the Mighty Ducks of Anaheim in the 1993 NHL Expansion Draft.

After the Mighty Ducks, Corkum made stops with the Philadelphia Flyers, Phoenix Coyotes, Los Angeles Kings, New Jersey Devils, and Atlanta Thrashers. The Thrashers traded him back to the Sabres at the trade deadline of the 2001–02 season. After finishing the season with the Sabres, Corkum retired. In his NHL career, Corkum played in 720 games. He recorded 97 goals and 103 assists, for 200 total points. His best season came in 1993–94 with Anaheim, when he scored 23 goals and added 28 assists.

== Coaching career ==
On August 22, 2008, it was announced that Corkum would be returning to his alma mater to become the associate head coach at the University of Maine. He spent the majority of the previous four seasons coaching junior hockey in the EJHL, and prior to that at Newburyport High in Massachusetts.

On April 30, 2013, USA Hockey named Corkum the head coach of Team USA for the 2013 Ivan Hlinka Memorial Tournament to be held in Slovakia during August 2013.

== Career statistics ==
=== Regular season and playoffs ===
			Regular season					Playoffs
Season	Team	League	GP	G	A	Pts	PIM	GP	G	A	Pts	PIM
1984–85	Triton Regional High School	HS-MA	18	35	36	71	54	—	—	—	—	—
1985–86	University of Maine	HE	39	7	26	33	53	—	—	—	—	—
1986–87	University of Maine	HE	35	18	11	29	24	—	—	—	—	—
1987–88	University of Maine	HE	40	14	18	32	64	—	—	—	—	—
1988–89	University of Maine	HE	45	17	31	48	64	—	—	—	—	—
1989–90	Rochester Americans	AHL	43	8	11	19	45	12	2	5	7	16
1989–90	Buffalo Sabres	NHL	8	2	0	2	4	5	1	0	1	4
1990–91	Rochester Americans	AHL	69	13	21	34	77	15	4	4	8	4
1991–92	Rochester Americans	AHL	52	16	12	28	47	8	0	6	6	8
1991–92	Buffalo Sabres	NHL	20	2	4	6	21	4	1	0	1	0
1992–93	Buffalo Sabres	NHL	68	6	4	10	38	5	0	0	0	2
1993–94	Mighty Ducks of Anaheim	NHL	76	23	28	51	18	—	—	—	—	—
1994–95	Mighty Ducks of Anaheim	NHL	44	10	9	19	25	—	—	—	—	—
1995–96	Mighty Ducks of Anaheim	NHL	48	5	7	12	26	—	—	—	—	—
1995–96	Philadelphia Flyers	NHL	28	4	3	7	8	12	1	2	3	6
1996–97	Phoenix Coyotes	NHL	80	9	11	20	40	7	2	2	4	4
1997–98	Phoenix Coyotes	NHL	76	12	9	21	28	6	1	0	1	4
1998–99	Phoenix Coyotes	NHL	77	9	10	19	17	7	0	1	1	4
1999–2000	Los Angeles Kings	NHL	45	5	6	11	14	4	0	0	0	0
2000–01	Los Angeles Kings	NHL	58	4	6	10	18	—	—	—	—	—
2000–01	New Jersey Devils	NHL	17	3	1	4	4	12	1	2	3	0
2001–02	Atlanta Thrashers	NHL	65	3	4	7	16	—	—	—	—	—
2001–02	Buffalo Sabres	NHL	10	0	1	1	4	—	—	—	—	—
NHL totals			720	97	103	200	281	62	7	7	14	24

=== International ===
Year	Team	Event	Result	GP	G	A	Pts	PIM
1987	United States	WJC	4th	7	4	0	4	6
Junior totals				7	4	0	4	6
