= Michal Grošek =

Czech ice hockey player

- Born: June 1, 1975 (age 50) Vyškov, Czechoslovakia
- Height: 6 ft 2 in (188 cm)
- Weight: 216 lb (98 kg; 15 st 6 lb)
- Position: Right wing
- Shot: Right
- Played for: Winnipeg Jets; Buffalo Sabres; Chicago Blackhawks; New York Rangers; Boston Bruins; Genève-Servette HC; SKA Saint Petersburg; EV Zug; Leksands IF
- NHL draft: 145th overall, 1993; Winnipeg Jets
- Playing career: 1992–2008

Michal Grošek (born June 1, 1975) is a Czech former professional ice hockey right winger. He played in the National Hockey League for 11 seasons, from 1993 to 2004.

== Career ==
Grošek was drafted 145th overall by the Winnipeg Jets in the 1993 NHL entry draft. Upon suiting up for the Jets, he made history by becoming the first Czech born player to play for the club. In total, he played in 526 career NHL games, scoring 84 goals and 137 assists for 221 points. Grošek's best offensive season was the 1998–99 season, when he was playing with the Buffalo Sabres. Grošek registered career highs in goals (20), assists (30), points (50), penalty minutes (102), and shots (140) during that season. In 2000, he requested a trade and was thus traded to the Chicago Blackhawks for Doug Gilmour and J.P. Dumont. After Chicago, Grošek played for the New York Rangers and the Boston Bruins but was never able to recapture his form shown in 1998-99. Grošek has since expressed regret over the trade, calling it "my big mistake" and stating he should have stayed in Buffalo.

After departing from the NHL, Grošek moved to Switzerland, suiting up for Nationalliga A side Genève-Servette HC, where he was the team's top goal scorer with 15 goals. He then moved to the Russian Super League, playing for SKA Saint Petersburg, where he scored just 3 goals in 13 games before returning to Servette, where he managed 9 goals in 17 games. In 2006, he moved to EV Zug, staying for two seasons before moving to Leksands IF in HockeyAllsvenskan.

In September 2008, Grošek was named head coach of Swiss lower league team CP Meyrin, ending his playing career.

== Career statistics ==
			Regular season					Playoffs
Season	Team	League	GP	G	A	Pts	PIM	GP	G	A	Pts	PIM
1992–93	AC ZPS Zlín	TCH	18	1	3	4		—	—	—	—	—
1993–94	Tacoma Rockets	WHL	30	25	20	45	106	7	2	2	4	30
1993–94	Winnipeg Jets	NHL	3	1	0	1	0	—	—	—	—	—
1993–94	Moncton Hawks	AHL	20	1	2	3	47	2	0	0	0	0
1994–95	Springfield Falcons	AHL	45	10	22	32	98	—	—	—	—	—
1994–95	Winnipeg Jets	NHL	24	2	2	4	21	—	—	—	—	—
1995–96	Winnipeg Jets	NHL	1	0	0	0	0	—	—	—	—	—
1995–96	Springfield Falcons	AHL	39	16	19	35	68	—	—	—	—	—
1995–96	Buffalo Sabres	NHL	22	6	4	10	31	—	—	—	—	—
1996–97	Buffalo Sabres	NHL	82	15	21	36	71	12	3	3	6	8
1997–98	Buffalo Sabres	NHL	67	10	20	30	60	15	6	4	10	28
1998–99	Buffalo Sabres	NHL	76	20	30	50	102	13	0	4	4	28
1999–2000	Buffalo Sabres	NHL	61	11	23	34	35	—	—	—	—	—
1999–2000	Chicago Blackhawks	NHL	14	2	4	6	12	—	—	—	—	—
2000–01	New York Rangers	NHL	65	9	11	20	61	—	—	—	—	—
2000–01	Hartford Wolf Pack	AHL	12	8	7	15	12	—	—	—	—	—
2001–02	New York Rangers	NHL	15	3	2	5	12	—	—	—	—	—
2001–02	Hartford Wolf Pack	AHL	48	14	30	44	167	—	—	—	—	—
2002–03	Boston Bruins	NHL	63	2	18	20	71	5	0	0	0	13
2003–04	Boston Bruins	NHL	33	3	2	5	33	—	—	—	—	—
2004–05	Genève–Servette HC	NLA	41	15	21	36	141	—	—	—	—	—
2005–06	Genève–Servette HC	NLA	17	9	3	12	99	—	—	—	—	—
2005–06	SKA St. Petersburg	RSL	13	3	0	3	36	—	—	—	—	—
2006–07	Genève–Servette HC	NLA	1	0	0	0	2	—	—	—	—	—
2006–07	HC Fribourg–Gottéron	NLA	5	1	3	4	16	—	—	—	—	—
2006–07	EV Zug	NLA	24	13	17	30	50	11	0	2	2	46
2007–08	EV Zug	NLA	39	12	12	24	60	—	—	—	—	—
2007–08	Leksands IF	SWE.2	10	3	6	9	37	7	1	3	4	10
NHL totals			526	84	137	221	509	45	9	11	20	77
AHL totals			164	49	80	129	392	2	0	0	0	0
NLA totals			127	50	56	106	368	11	0	2	2	46
