= Donald Audette =

Canadian ice hockey player (born 1969)

- Born: September 23, 1969 (age 56) Laval, Quebec, Canada
- Height: 5 ft 8 in (173 cm)
- Weight: 192 lb (87 kg; 13 st 10 lb)
- Position: Right wing
- Shot: Right
- Played for: Buffalo Sabres; Los Angeles Kings; Atlanta Thrashers; Dallas Stars; Montreal Canadiens; Florida Panthers
- NHL draft: 183rd overall, 1989; Buffalo Sabres
- Playing career: 1989–2004

Donald Daniel Audette (born September 23, 1969) is a Canadian former professional ice hockey forward who played fourteen seasons in the National Hockey League (NHL) for the Buffalo Sabres, Los Angeles Kings, Atlanta Thrashers, Dallas Stars, Montreal Canadiens and Florida Panthers.

== Playing career ==
He was selected in the ninth round of the 1989 NHL entry draft (183rd overall) by the Buffalo Sabres. Prior to playing in the National Hockey League (NHL), Audette won the Dudley "Red" Garrett Memorial Award as the top rookie in the American Hockey League (AHL), while playing for the Rochester Americans.

Despite his small stature, Audette became known for his gritty, feisty style of play and quickly endeared himself to Buffalo hockey fans with a 31-goal rookie campaign. However, his approach to the game often led to lengthy trips to the injury reserve, including several knee injuries that cut short his 1990–91, 1992–93 and 1995–96 seasons respectively.

In 1998, Audette was traded to the Los Angeles Kings. Two years later, as a member of the Atlanta Thrashers, he reached his career high in goals (34) and assists (45) and was chosen as participant in that season's NHL All-Star game.

Audette would be traded back to the Sabres in March 2001, and signed a multimillion-dollar contract with the Dallas Stars later that summer. In the midst of the 2001–02 season, Audette was again traded, this time to the Montreal Canadiens. In a game against the New York Rangers on December 1, 2001, Audette had the tendons of his forearm severed by an opponent's skate and required life-saving surgery to repair the extensive damage, but still managed to recover in time for the playoffs.

After being placed on unconditional waivers by the Canadiens in January 2004, Audette signed with the Florida Panthers for the latter half of the 2003–04 season. Following this, he announced his retirement from professional play.

== Personal life ==
Audette's son Daniel (b. 1996) was the first pick of the 2012 Quebec Major Junior Hockey League (QMJHL) Draft and was selected by the Montreal Canadiens in the 2014 NHL entry draft.

Currently, Audette works an amateur scout with the Canadiens organization.

== Career statistics ==
			Regular season					Playoffs
Season	Team	League	GP	G	A	Pts	PIM	GP	G	A	Pts	PIM
1985–86	Laval Régents	QMAAA	41	32	38	70	51	8	5	9	14	10
1986–87	Laval Titan	QMJHL	66	17	22	39	36	14	2	6	8	10
1987–88	Laval Titan	QMJHL	63	48	61	109	56	14	7	12	19	20
1988–89	Laval Titan	QMJHL	70	76	85	161	123	17	17	12	29	43
1989–90	Rochester Americans	AHL	70	42	46	88	78	15	9	8	17	29
1989–90	Buffalo Sabres	NHL	—	—	—	—	—	2	0	0	0	0
1990–91	Rochester Americans	AHL	5	4	0	4	2	—	—	—	—	—
1990–91	Buffalo Sabres	NHL	8	4	3	7	4	—	—	—	—	—
1991–92	Buffalo Sabres	NHL	63	31	17	48	75	—	—	—	—	—
1992–93	Rochester Americans	AHL	6	8	4	12	10	—	—	—	—	—
1992–93	Buffalo Sabres	NHL	44	12	7	19	51	8	2	2	4	6
1993–94	Buffalo Sabres	NHL	77	29	30	59	41	7	0	1	1	6
1994–95	Buffalo Sabres	NHL	46	24	13	37	27	5	1	1	2	4
1995–96	Buffalo Sabres	NHL	23	12	13	25	18	—	—	—	—	—
1996–97	Buffalo Sabres	NHL	73	28	22	50	48	11	4	5	9	6
1997–98	Buffalo Sabres	NHL	75	24	20	44	59	15	5	8	13	10
1998–99	Los Angeles Kings	NHL	49	18	18	36	51	—	—	—	—	—
1999–2000	Los Angeles Kings	NHL	49	12	20	32	45	—	—	—	—	—
1999–2000	Atlanta Thrashers	NHL	14	7	4	11	12	—	—	—	—	—
2000–01	Atlanta Thrashers	NHL	64	32	39	71	64	—	—	—	—	—
2000–01	Buffalo Sabres	NHL	12	2	6	8	12	13	3	6	9	4
2001–02	Dallas Stars	NHL	20	4	8	12	12	—	—	—	—	—
2001–02	Montreal Canadiens	NHL	13	1	5	6	8	12	6	4	10	10
2002–03	Montreal Canadiens	NHL	54	11	12	23	19	—	—	—	—	—
2002–03	Hamilton Bulldogs	AHL	11	5	5	10	8	—	—	—	—	—
2003–04	Montreal Canadiens	NHL	23	3	5	8	16	—	—	—	—	—
2003–04	Florida Panthers	NHL	28	6	7	13	22	—	—	—	—	—
NHL totals			735	260	249	509	584	73	21	27	48	46

== Awards and honours ==
Award	Year
QMJHL
First All-Star Team	1989
Guy Lafleur Trophy	1989
AHL
Dudley "Red" Garrett Memorial Award	1990
First All-Star Team	1990
NHL
NHL All-Star Game	2001
