= Bob Bassen =

Canadian ice hockey player

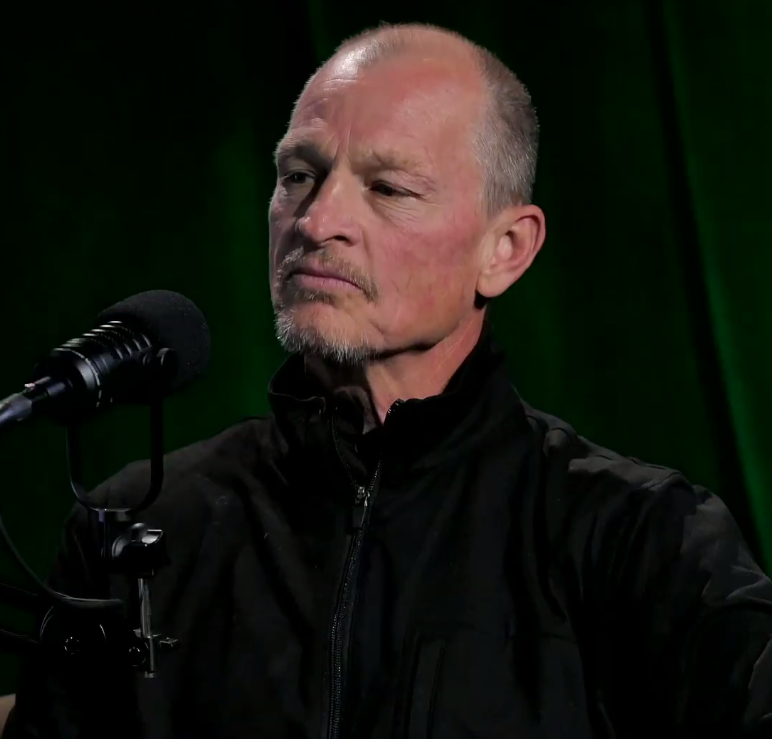
- Bassen in 2023
- Born: May 6, 1965 (age 60) Calgary, Alberta, Canada
- Height: 5 ft 10 in (178 cm)
- Weight: 180 lb (82 kg; 12 st 12 lb)
- Position: Centre
- Shot: Left
- Played for: New York Islanders; Chicago Blackhawks; St. Louis Blues; Quebec Nordiques; Dallas Stars; Calgary Flames; Frankfurt Lions
- National team: Canada
- NHL draft: Undrafted
- Playing career: 1985–2000

Robert Paul "Bob" Bassen (born May 6, 1965) is a Canadian former professional ice hockey centre. He played in the National Hockey League between 1985 and 2000. Internationally Bassen played for the Canadian national team at the 1985 World Junior Championships, where he won a gold medal, and the 1992 World Championships.

== Hockey career ==
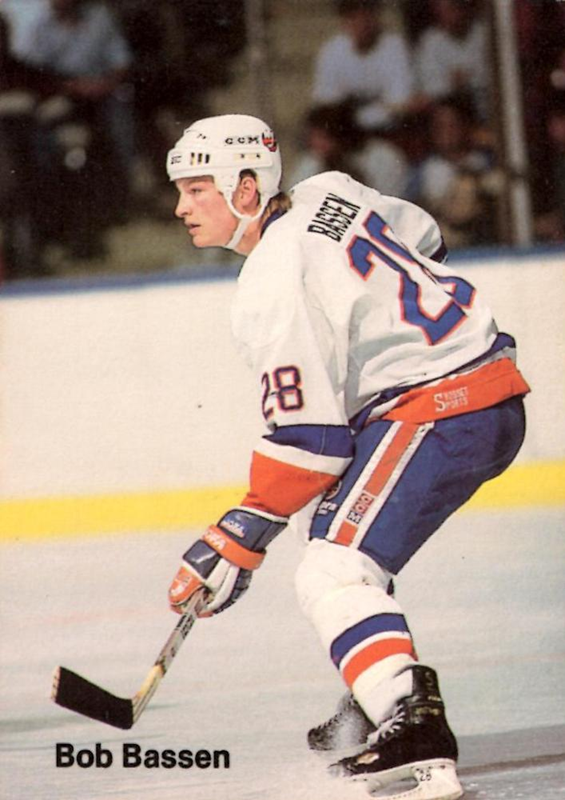
1987 card of Bassen for New York Islanders

Medal record

Representing Canada

World Junior Championships
Gold medal – first place	1985 Finland	

As a youth, Bassen played in the 1977 Quebec International Pee-Wee Hockey Tournament with a minor ice hockey team from Varsity Acres.

Bassen began his career in the National Hockey League in 1984 when he was signed as a free agent by the New York Islanders. After several seasons with the Islanders, Bassen was traded early in the 1988–89 NHL season to the Chicago Blackhawks. He remained in the Blackhawks organization for two seasons before he was claimed by the St. Louis Blues in the waiver draft prior to the start of the 1990–91 NHL season. After spending parts of four seasons with the Blues, he was traded to the Quebec Nordiques. Bassen signed with the Dallas Stars as a free agent in 1995. He played for the Calgary Flames and a second tour with the Blues before ending his NHL career.

After his retirement, Bassen was an assistant coach with the Utah Grizzlies for three years. He currently serves as the director of alumni relations for the Dallas Stars.

== Career statistics ==
=== Regular season and playoffs ===
			Regular season					Playoffs
Season	Team	League	GP	G	A	Pts	PIM	GP	G	A	Pts	PIM
1982–83	Calgary Spurs	AJHL	45	27	23	50	129	—	—	—	—	—
1982–83	Medicine Hat Tigers	WHL	4	3	2	5	0	3	0	0	0	4
1983–84	Medicine Hat Tigers	WHL	72	29	29	58	93	14	5	11	16	12
1984–85	Medicine Hat Tigers	WHL	65	32	50	82	143	10	2	8	10	39
1985–86	New York Islanders	NHL	11	2	1	3	6	3	0	1	1	0
1985–86	Springfield Indians	AHL	54	13	21	34	111	—	—	—	—	—
1986–87	New York Islanders	NHL	77	7	10	17	89	14	1	2	3	21
1987–88	New York Islanders	NHL	77	6	16	22	99	6	0	1	1	23
1988–89	New York Islanders	NHL	19	1	4	5	21	—	—	—	—	—
1988–89	Chicago Blackhawks	NHL	49	4	12	16	62	10	1	1	2	34
1989–90	Chicago Blackhawks	NHL	6	1	1	2	8	1	0	0	0	0
1989–90	Indianapolis Ice	IHL	73	22	32	54	179	12	3	8	11	33
1990–91	St. Louis Blues	NHL	79	16	18	34	183	13	1	3	4	24
1991–92	St. Louis Blues	NHL	79	7	25	32	167	6	0	2	2	4
1992–93	St. Louis Blues	NHL	53	9	10	19	63	11	0	0	0	10
1993–94	St. Louis Blues	NHL	46	2	7	9	44	—	—	—	—	—
1993–94	Quebec Nordiques	NHL	37	11	8	19	55	—	—	—	—	—
1994–95	Quebec Nordiques	NHL	47	12	15	27	33	5	2	4	6	0
1995–96	Dallas Stars	NHL	13	0	1	1	15	—	—	—	—	—
1995–96	Michigan K-Wings	IHL	1	0	0	0	4	—	—	—	—	—
1996–97	Dallas Stars	NHL	46	5	7	12	41	7	3	1	4	4
1997–98	Dallas Stars	NHL	58	3	4	7	57	17	1	0	1	12
1998–99	Calgary Flames	NHL	41	1	2	3	35	—	—	—	—	—
1999–00	Frankfurt Lions	DEL	14	2	9	11	6	—	—	—	—	—
1999–00	St. Louis Blues	NHL	27	1	3	4	26	—	—	—	—	—
NHL totals			765	88	144	232	1004	93	9	15	24	134

=== International ===
Year	Team	Event	GP	G	A	Pts	PIM
1985	Canada	WJC	7	2	0	2	8
1992	Canada	WC	3	1	1	2	0
Junior totals			7	2	0	2	8
Senior totals			3	1	1	2	0

== Awards ==
- WHL East First All-Star Team – 1985
