= Avalanche–Red Wings rivalry =

National Hockey League rivalry

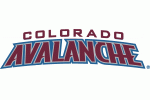
- Colorado Avalanche Detroit Red Wings
- First meeting: October 6, 1995 (Note: This does not include the Avalanche's 21–20–4–0 record against Detroit as the Quebec Nordiques.)
- Latest meeting: November 7, 2026
- Next meeting: December 3, 2026

Statistics
- Total meetings: 126
- All-time series: 65–51–1–10 (DET)
- Regular season series: 48–34–1–10 (DET)
- Postseason results: 17–17
- Largest victory: DET 7–0 COL; March 22, 1996; May 31, 2002
- Longest win streak: COL W10
- Current win streak: COL W1

Postseason history
- 1996 conference finals: Avalanche won, 4–2; 1997 conference finals: Red Wings won, 4–2; 1999 conference semifinals: Avalanche won, 4–2; 2000 conference semifinals: Avalanche won, 4–1; 2002 conference finals: Red Wings won, 4–3; 2008 conference semifinals: Red Wings won, 4–0

The Avalanche–Red Wings rivalry is a National Hockey League (NHL) rivalry between the Colorado Avalanche and Detroit Red Wings. The rivalry gained notoriety during the mid-1990s and early 2000s, with the peak of the rivalry occurring from 1996 to 2002 during which stretch the two teams met in the postseason five times and combined to win five Stanley Cups, with the Red Wings winning three and the Avalanche winning two during that stretch. The epicenter of the rivalry was during a March 26, 1997 game at Joe Louis Arena that featured 18 fighting majors, and 148 penalty minutes.

== History ==
=== 1996 Western Conference finals ===
The two teams first played each other in the playoffs in the 1996 Western Conference finals. The Detroit Red Wings won an NHL record 62 games during the regular season and won the Presidents' Trophy and were heavy favorites to win the Stanley Cup and end their four-decade Stanley Cup drought. However, the Colorado Avalanche won the first two games in Detroit to take a 2–0 series lead heading home for game three. In the first period of game three, Avalanche defenseman Adam Foote moved in on Red Wings winger Vyacheslav Kozlov from behind to close down a play in the corner. Kozlov then hit and slammed Foote's face into the glass, opening a huge gash on his forehead. Foote returned to the game and scored a goal with 16 seconds left to cut the deficit to 5–3. Kozlov was not penalized for his hit on Foote, which angered the Avalanche, especially forward Claude Lemieux. Late in the game, Lemieux purposefully sucker punched Kozlov. The Red Wings won game three 6–4.

Lemieux, who was once ranked by TSN as the second most-hated player in the NHL (behind Sean Avery), was fined $1,000 and was suspended for game four of the Western Conference finals. The Avalanche won 4–2 in game four before the Red Wings would win game five in Detroit 5–2 to send the series back to Denver for game six. With the Avalanche up 1–0 with 5:53 left in the first period, Red Wings center Kris Draper collected the puck in front of the Avalanche bench. After dumping the puck against the Avalanche, Draper continued to move backward along the boards. Just as Draper turned toward the Red Wings bench, Lemieux barreled into Draper at full speed. Draper's face was driven directly into the dasher on top of the boards with no time or space to react. The hit sent Draper out of the game and into the hospital with a broken jaw, shattered cheek and orbital bone which required reconstructive surgery involving his jaw being wired shut and numerous stitches. The Red Wings lost 4–1 in game six and were eliminated from the playoffs.

When the Red Wings found out the full extent of Draper's injuries, Red Wings forward Dino Ciccarelli said "I can't believe I shook [Lemieux's] freakin' hand right after the game. That pisses me right off." While Draper is unconscious in the Red Wings training room, Red Wings owner Mike Ilitch demanded photos of Draper's injury for the league hearing and a possible criminal prosecution against Lemieux. Draper was cleared to fly home with the team on Red Bird One, with the pilots kept on constant alert in case Draper required an emergency landing. Lemieux was suspended for the first two games of the 1996 Stanley Cup Final, but the Avalanche would sweep the Florida Panthers to win their first Stanley Cup in franchise history in their first season in Denver. Lemieux never apologized for his hit on Draper.

That season, prior to the Avalanche–Red Wings meeting in the conference finals, longtime Montreal Canadiens starting goaltender Patrick Roy demanded a trade from the Canadiens after he felt humiliated for being left in a game after surrendering nine goals during an 11–1 loss against the eventual Presidents' Trophy-winning Red Wings on December 9. On December 6, 1995, the Avalanche had received Roy and Mike Keane from the Canadiens for Jocelyn Thibault, Martin Ručínský, and Andrei Kovalenko. Keane was the former captain of the Canadiens, and Roy was a six-time NHL All-Star, four-time William M. Jennings Trophy winner, three-time Vezina Trophy winner, and two-time Conn Smythe Trophy winner (1986 and 1993). Roy's acquisition would prove pivotal for the Avalanche as he started 38 games, going 22–15–1 with a .909 save percentage and 2.68 goals against average (GAA). During the 1996 playoffs, Roy started all 22 games, going 16–6 with a .921 save percentage, 2.10 GAA, and three shutouts, including the upset of the Red Wings in the conference finals, and followed by the Stanley Cup-deciding triple overtime win in game four of the 1996 Stanley Cup Final.

=== Fight Night at the Joe ===
The Avalanche and the Red Wings faced each other four times during the 1996–97 NHL season. Lemieux did not play in the first two games due to an abdominal injury and the Avalanche seemed to purposefully limit the amount of time Lemieux and Red Wings forward Darren McCarty spend on the ice together. The Avalanche won each of the first three games heading into the final matchup of the regular season between the two teams on March 26, 1997, at Joe Louis Arena.

Heading into the game, the Red Wings accused the Avalanche of shortening their bench in Denver. The Avalanche never ate anything in Detroit that wasn't prepared by their own chefs, and always had issues at Joe Louis Arena from lack of hot water, noxious paint in the locker room, to pre-game meals that didn't show up.

Prior to the game, Red Wings coach Scotty Bowman used Lemieux's hit on Draper and his lack of remorse as a rallying cry in order to get his team to add a physical edge to their game. On the day of the game, The Detroit News printed a "wanted" poster of Lemieux with a prison number under his photo under the headline "A Time For Revenge", and compared Lemieux to a carjacker.

Four minutes and 45 seconds into the first period, Avalanche defenseman Brent Severyn battled Red Wings defenseman Jamie Pushor. A few minutes later, Red Wings forward Kirk Maltby dropped Avalanche forward René Corbet. Just before the end of the first period, Avalanche forward Peter Forsberg knocked Red Wings center Igor Larionov onto his backside away from the play in front of the Red Wings bench. Near center ice, Red Wings forward Brendan Shanahan helped McCarty spin out of Foote's grip and then McCarty punched Lemieux at his right temple, and Lemieux crumbled down to the ice. With the crowd on their feet and the referees tied up elsewhere, McCarthy continued to beat up Lemieux, who was already bleeding badly. Avalanche goaltender Patrick Roy then went to help rescue Lemieux, which led to a fight between Roy and Shanahan followed by a fight between Roy and Red Wings goaltender Mike Vernon. While the fight between Roy and Vernon winded down, McCarty dragged Lemieux's body to where Draper was standing on the Red Wings bench. The blood pouring from Lemieux turned into a three-foot section of ice crimson. While one ref desperately tried to scrape the blood caused by Lemieux's injury off the ice with his skates, the players retrieved their gear and Roy, Forsberg, and Lemieux had their wounds dressed. McCarty only received a double minor for his actions. While the Avalanche got a four-minute power play, McCarty was allowed to return to the game, along with Roy and Vernon. Vernon was so convinced that he was ejected that he went to his locker stall only to have an official race in to tell Vernon to put his gear back on and get back in net.

The brawls continued into the second period as the second period featured five fights, 78 penalty minutes, and two game misconduct penalties. The Red Wings trailed 5–3 early in the third period. Midway into the third period, the Red Wings scored two goals in 24 seconds to tie the game on a wrap-around goal that Shanahan bounced off the back of Roy's left skate. In the first minute of overtime, Shanahan forced a turnover by Lemieux in the neutral zone. Larionov picked up the puck along the boards and weaved through three defenders to get into the Avalanche's defensive zone. Larionov drove the puck through the net to set up for McCarty's game-winning goal to give the Red Wings a 6–5 win over the Avalanche.

=== Afterward ===
The Red Wings and the Avalanche met again in the 1997 Western Conference finals where Marc Crawford screamed at Bowman across the glass separating the two benches in game four at Joe Louis Arena on May 22. Bowman then told Crawford, "I knew your father before you did, and I don't think he'd be very proud of how you're acting." Crawford was fined $10,000 for the tirade. The Red Wings got their revenge by winning that game 6–0 and won the series in six games, en route to eventually sweeping the Philadelphia Flyers in the 1997 Stanley Cup Final for their first Stanley Cup in 42 years. Draper skated right past Lemieux in the handshake line following the Western Conference finals. Draper and Lemieux finally shook hands at the 2014 NHL entry draft but Lemieux never apologized to Draper.

In a November 11, 1997 match between the two teams, McCarty and Lemieux began to throw punches seconds after the opening faceoff, much to the delight of the Joe Louis Arena crowd. On April Fools' Day in 1998, Roy fought Red Wings goaltender Chris Osgood at center ice. The referees called more severe penalties this time, as Roy and Osgood both received minor, major, misconduct, and game misconduct penalties. The Red Wings won 2–0 in a game that the two teams combined for 46 penalties totaling 228 minutes.

The two teams met again in the 1999 Western Conference semifinals and after the Red Wings won the first two games in Denver, the Avalanche came back to win the series in six games.

The two teams met again in the 2000 Western Conference semifinals and the Avalanche won in five games.

In the 2001 Stanley Cup playoffs, the Red Wings were eliminated in the first round by the Los Angeles Kings thanks to ex-Avalanche player Adam Deadmarsh, who had been traded away mid-season for Rob Blake.

A game between the Red Wings and Avalanche at the Pepsi Center on March 23, 2002, broke into a brawl (much smaller than the previous two) when Kirk Maltby came into Patrick Roy's net and Roy took exception. The brawl continued when Red Wings goaltender Dominik Hasek skated down the length of the ice to confront Roy but tripped on a discarded stick, causing him to crash into and knock over Roy. Infuriated, Roy threw off his gloves and mask to fight as Hasek did the same, but the two were restrained by the officials, thus preventing Roy from fighting a third Red Wing goaltender since 1997. The Red Wings would also go on to win this game 2–0. The two teams would meet in the Western Conference finals where the Red Wings won the series in seven games, highlighted by a 7–0 win in game seven en route to winning the Stanley Cup against the Carolina Hurricanes in five games.

As players began to leave each team through free agency, trades or retirements, the rivalry began to die down. The two teams would only meet in the playoffs one more time, which came in the 2008 Western Conference semifinals where the Red Wings swept the Avalanche en route to winning the Stanley Cup. Detroit has since moved to the Eastern conference in the 2013–14 season, making the only way the two teams can meet in the playoffs is if both reach the Stanley Cup Final.

The two teams played each other in the 2016 NHL Stadium Series where the Red Wings won 5–3 with Brad Richards scoring the game-winning goal with 1 minute left to put the Red Wings ahead 4-3 followed by Darren Helm scoring an empty net goal 40 seconds later to put the Red Wings ahead 5–3. The Avalanche won the alumni game 5–2 the day before led by Roy. Avalanche general manager Joe Sakic, who was the captain for the Avalanche during the Fight Night at the Joe, keeps a picture on his wall of the alumni game.

Sakic won his third Stanley Cup with the Avalanche as vice president and general manager at the conclusion of the 2021–22 season. Former Detroit Red Wing Darren Helm was signed to the Avalanche prior to the season and scored the second round series-clinching goal with 5.6 seconds left in game six against the St. Louis Blues. He then became the only player to win the Stanley Cup with Detroit and Colorado. Cale Makar became only the third player in NHL history to win the James Norris Memorial Trophy and Conn Smythe Trophy in the same season, the last player to accomplish this was Detroit's Nicklas Lidström (2001–02).

In June 2022, ESPN released an E:60 documentary titled Unrivaled, detailing the history of the rivalry.
