= 1996 Stanley Cup playoffs =

Tournament details
- Dates: April 16–June 10, 1996
- Teams: 16
- Defending champions: New Jersey Devils (did not qualify)

Final positions
- Champions: Colorado Avalanche
- Runners-up: Florida Panthers

Tournament statistics
- Scoring leader(s): Joe Sakic (Avalanche) (34 points)

Awards
- MVP: Joe Sakic (Avalanche)

The 1996 Stanley Cup playoffs, the playoff tournament of the National Hockey League (NHL), began on April 16, 1996. The playoffs ended on June 10, 1996, with the Colorado Avalanche sweeping the Florida Panthers to win their first Stanley Cup in franchise history in both teams' first Finals appearance. Colorado became the first relocated team to win the Stanley Cup in their inaugural season after relocating from Quebec City prior to the start of the regular season.

The New Jersey Devils became the first defending champion to fail to qualify for the playoffs since the Montreal Canadiens in 1970. Five Canadian teams qualified for the playoffs and all of them were eliminated during the opening round. This was the first time that both Florida teams (the Florida Panthers and Tampa Bay Lightning) made it to the playoffs, each in their inaugural appearance. For the second time in three years and the last time until 2013, all of the Original Six teams reached the playoffs. This was also the last time all three California-based teams missed the playoffs in the same year until 2020.

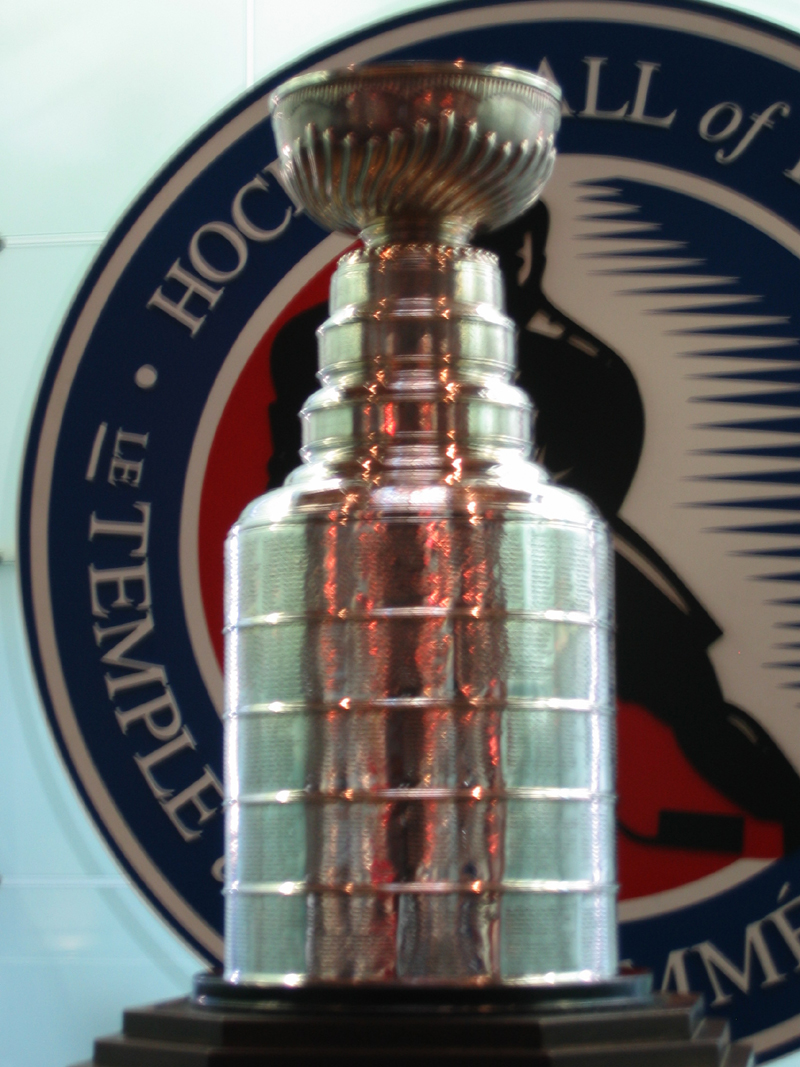
The Stanley Cup, awarded to the champion of the NHL

== Playoff seeds ==
The top eight teams in each conference qualified for the playoffs. The top two seeds in each conference were awarded to the division winners; while the six remaining spots were awarded to the highest finishers in their respective conferences.

The following teams qualified for the playoffs:

=== Eastern Conference ===
1. Philadelphia Flyers, Atlantic Division champions, Eastern Conference regular season champions – 103 points
2. Pittsburgh Penguins, Northeast Division champions – 102 points
3. New York Rangers – 96 points
4. Florida Panthers – 92 points
5. Boston Bruins – 91 points
6. Montreal Canadiens – 90 points
7. Washington Capitals – 89 points
8. Tampa Bay Lightning – 88 points

=== Western Conference ===
1. Detroit Red Wings, Central Division champions, Western Conference regular season champions, Presidents' Trophy winners – 131 points
2. Colorado Avalanche, Pacific Division champions – 104 points
3. Chicago Blackhawks – 94 points
4. Toronto Maple Leafs – 80 points (34 wins)
5. St. Louis Blues – 80 points (32 wins)
6. Calgary Flames – 79 points (34 wins)
7. Vancouver Canucks – 79 points (32 wins)
8. Winnipeg Jets – 78 points

== Playoff bracket ==
In each round, teams competed in a best-of-seven series, following a 2–2–1–1–1 format (scores in the bracket indicate the number of games won in each best-of-seven series). The team with home ice advantage played at home for games one and two (and games five and seven, if necessary), and the other team played at home for games three and four (and game six, if necessary). For any series played between Central and Pacific Division teams, the team with home ice advantage had the option of using a 2–3–2 format to reduce travel, with the sites for games five and six switched; if the 2–3–2 format was chosen, the team with home ice advantage then had the additional option to start the series on the road instead of at home. The top eight teams in each conference made the playoffs, with the two division winners seeded 1–2 based on regular season record, and the six remaining teams seeded 3–8.

The NHL used "re-seeding" instead of a fixed bracket playoff system. During the first three rounds, the highest remaining seed in each conference was matched against the lowest remaining seed, the second-highest remaining seed played the second-lowest remaining seed, and so forth. The higher-seeded team was awarded home ice advantage. The two conference winners then advanced to the Stanley Cup Final, where home ice advantage was awarded to the team that had the better regular season record.

Conference quarterfinals	Conference semifinals
1	Philadelphia	4
8	Tampa Bay	2
1	Philadelphia	2
4	Florida	4
2	Pittsburgh	4
7	Washington	2
Eastern Conference
3	NY Rangers	4
6	Montreal	2
2	Pittsburgh	4
3	NY Rangers	1
4	Florida	4
5	Boston	1
1	Detroit	4
8	Winnipeg	2
1	Detroit	4
5	St. Louis	3
2	Colorado	4
7	Vancouver	2
Western Conference
3	Chicago	4
6	Calgary	0
2	Colorado	4
3	Chicago	2
4	Toronto	2
5	St. Louis	4

Conference finals
4	Florida	4
2	Pittsburgh	3
1	Detroit	2
2	Colorado	4

Stanley Cup Final
E4	Florida	0
W2	Colorado	4

== Conference quarterfinals ==
=== Eastern Conference quarterfinals ===
==== (1) Philadelphia Flyers vs. (8) Tampa Bay Lightning ====
This was the first playoff meeting between these two teams. This was the first time that the Tampa Bay area was represented in the Stanley Cup playoffs. Game four set an NHL attendance record with 28,183 fans, and game six was the final game they ever played at the Thunderdome.

April 16	Tampa Bay Lightning	3–7	Philadelphia Flyers	CoreStates Spectrum	Recap
No scoring		First period	00:55 – Dale Hawerchuk (1); 05:56 – pp – Joel Otto (1); 06:27 – Trent Klatt (1)
Jason Wiemer (1) – pp – 15:08; Mikael Andersson (1) – 16:26		Second period	03:41 – John LeClair (1); 07:32 – pp – Eric Lindros (1); 12:01 – Pat Falloon (1)
John Cullen (1) – 04:01		Third period	12:27 – Rod Brind'Amour (1)
Daren Puppa 10 saves / 14 shots Jeff Reese 15 saves / 18 shots		Goalie stats	Ron Hextall 14 saves / 17 shots

April 18	Tampa Bay Lightning	2–1	OT	Philadelphia Flyers	CoreStates Spectrum	Recap
No scoring		First period		01:48 – pp – Dale Hawerchuk (2)
No scoring		Second period		No scoring
Alexander Selivanov (1) – 04:02		Third period		No scoring
Brian Bellows (1) – 09:05		First overtime period		No scoring
Daren Puppa 26 saves / 27 shots		Goalie stats		Ron Hextall 25 saves / 27 shots

April 21	Philadelphia Flyers	4–5	OT	Tampa Bay Lightning	Thunderdome	Recap
Joel Otto (2) – 10:30; Trent Klatt (2) – 18:33		First period		02:52 – pp – Petr Klima (1)
Pat Falloon (2) – pp – 00:39		Second period		02:56 – sh – Rob Zamuner (1); 14:43 – Rob Zamuner (2)
Eric Lindros (2) – 03:20		Third period		18:41 – Brian Bellows (2)
No scoring		First overtime period		02:04 – Alexander Selivanov (2)
Ron Hextall 27 saves / 32 shots		Goalie stats		Jeff Reese 38 saves / 42 shots

April 23	Philadelphia Flyers	4–1	Tampa Bay Lightning	Thunderdome	Recap
John LeClair (2) – pp – 07:56; Joel Otto (3) – 12:43		First period	No scoring
Dale Hawerchuk (3) – 16:55		Second period	09:24 – pp – Petr Klima (2)
John LeClair (3) – pp – 10:17		Third period	No scoring
Ron Hextall 21 saves / 22 shots		Goalie stats	Jeff Reese 29 saves / 33 shots

April 25	Tampa Bay Lightning	1–4	Philadelphia Flyers	CoreStates Spectrum	Recap
No scoring		First period	11:13 – pp – Mikael Renberg (1)
No scoring		Second period	01:50 – Shjon Podein (1)
John Cullen (2) – sh – 17:59		Third period	01:21 – pp – Pat Falloon (3); 02:43 – pp – John LeClair (4)
Daren Puppa 20 saves / 24 shots Jeff Reese 3 saves / 3 shots		Goalie stats	Ron Hextall 23 saves / 24 shots

April 27	Philadelphia Flyers	6–1	Tampa Bay Lightning	Thunderdome	Recap
Karl Dykhuis (1) – pp – 05:45; Shawn Antoski (1) – 06:40; Trent Klatt (3) – 14:53		First period	09:27 – John Cullen (3)
Bob Corkum (1) – 12:12; Eric Lindros (3) – 12:59		Second period	No scoring
Kjell Samuelsson (1) – 05:49		Third period	No scoring
Ron Hextall 27 saves / 28 shots		Goalie stats	Daren Puppa 16 saves / 21 shots Jeff Reese 3 saves / 4 shots

Philadelphia won series 4–2

==== (2) Pittsburgh Penguins vs. (7) Washington Capitals ====
This was the third consecutive and fifth overall playoff meeting between these two teams; with Pittsburgh winning three of the four previous series. Pittsburgh won last year's playoff meeting in seven games. Game four of this series is the seventh longest game in NHL history. Game six was the last playoff game at USAir Arena.

April 17	Washington Capitals	6–4	Pittsburgh Penguins	Civic Arena	Recap
Peter Bondra (1) – 19:23		First period	02:53 – Petr Nedved (1); 03:04 – Petr Nedved (2)
Sylvain Cote (1) – 16:12; Todd Krygier (1) – 19:26		Second period	05:47 – pp – Ron Francis (1); 11:09 – Tomas Sandstrom (1)
Sergei Gonchar (1) – pp – 07:58; Todd Krygier (2) – 12:26; Michal Pivonka (1) – en – 19:55		Third period	No scoring
Jim Carey 12 saves / 16 shots Olaf Kolzig 12 saves / 12 shots		Goalie stats	Tom Barrasso 29 saves / 34 shots

April 19	Washington Capitals	5–3	Pittsburgh Penguins	Civic Arena	Recap
No scoring		First period	03:03 – pp – Petr Nedved (2); 03:39 – Chris Joseph (1)
Pat Peake (1) – pp – 03:48; Pat Peake (2) – pp – 12:33; Mike Eagles (1) – 14:55		Second period	13:54 – Petr Nedved (3)
Peter Bondra (2) – pp – 11:43; Michal Pivonka (2) – en – 19:08		Third period	No scoring
Olaf Kolzig 33 saves / 36 shots		Goalie stats	Tom Barrasso 29 saves / 33 shots

April 22	Pittsburgh Penguins	4–1	Washington Capitals	USAir Arena	Recap
Ron Francis (2) – pp – 08:29; Glen Murray (1) – 17:52		First period	No scoring
Dave Roche (1) – 12:33; Kevin Miller (1) – 16:00		Second period	No scoring
No scoring		Third period	12:29 – pp – Sylvain Cote (2)
Tom Barrasso 38 saves / 39 shots		Goalie stats	Jim Carey 15 saves / 19 shots

April 24	Pittsburgh Penguins	3–2	4OT	Washington Capitals	USAir Arena	Recap
No scoring		First period		13:50 – pp – Michal Pivonka (3)
Jaromir Jagr (1) – sh – 18:42		Second period		07:36 – pp – Peter Bondra (3)
Petr Nedved (5) – pp – 08:00		Third period		No scoring
Petr Nedved (6) – 19:15		Fourth overtime period		No scoring
Tom Barrasso 8 saves / 9 shots Ken Wregget 53 saves / 54 shots		Goalie stats		Olaf Kolzig 62 saves / 65 shots

April 26	Washington Capitals	1–4	Pittsburgh Penguins	Civic Arena	Recap
No scoring		First period	08:36 – Mario Lemieux (1)
Andrew Brunette (1) – 14:51		Second period	10:14 – Francois Leroux (1); 13:15 – Bryan Smolinski (1)
No scoring		Third period	16:13 – Jaromir Jagr (2)
Olaf Kolzig 28 saves / 32 shots		Goalie stats	Ken Wregget 39 saves / 40 shots

April 28	Pittsburgh Penguins	3–2	Washington Capitals	USAir Arena	Recap
Mario Lemieux (2) – pp – 01:57; Jaromir Jagr (3) – pp – 06:03; Ron Francis (3) – 12:24		First period	No scoring
No scoring		Second period	01:43 – Dale Hunter (1)
No scoring		Third period	00:50 – Sergei Gonchar (2)
Ken Wregget 35 saves / 37 shots		Goalie stats	Jim Carey 2 saves / 4 shots Olaf Kolzig 21 saves / 22 shots

Pittsburgh won series 4–2

==== (3) New York Rangers vs. (6) Montreal Canadiens ====
This was the fourteenth playoff meeting between these two teams; with Montreal winning seven of the thirteen previous series. They last met in the 1986 Prince of Wales Conference final, which Montreal won in five games.

April 16	Montreal Canadiens	3–2	OT	New York Rangers	Madison Square Garden	Recap
Saku Koivu (1) – 19:50		First period		07:17 – pp – Adam Graves (1)
No scoring		Second period		No scoring
Vincent Damphousse (1) – 06:44		Third period		05:58 – Niklas Sundstrom (1)
Vincent Damphousse (2) – 05:04		First overtime period		No scoring
Jocelyn Thibault 43 saves / 45 shots		Goalie stats		Mike Richter 29 saves / 32 shots

April 18	Montreal Canadiens	5–3	New York Rangers	Madison Square Garden	Recap
Vincent Damphousse (3) – sh – 07:14; Mark Recchi (1) – pp – 18:29		First period	No scoring
Lyle Odelein (1) – 05:43		Second period	16:01 – Sergio Momesso (1)
Vincent Damphousse (4) – 16:34; Marc Bureau (1) – 19:54		Third period	07:12 – Sergio Momesso (2); 12:17 – Ulf Samuelsson (1)
Jocelyn Thibault 35 saves / 38 shots		Goalie stats	Mike Richter 24 saves / 28 shots

April 21	New York Rangers	2–1	Montreal Canadiens	Centre Molson	Recap
Adam Graves (2) – pp – 15:30; Adam Graves (3) – pp –17:50		First period	19:00 – pp – Mark Recchi (2)
No scoring		Second period	No scoring
No scoring		Third period	No scoring
Mike Richter 16 saves / 17 shots		Goalie stats	Jocelyn Thibault 33 saves / 35 shots

April 23	New York Rangers	4–3	Montreal Canadiens	Centre Molson	Recap
Mark Messier (1) – pp – 12:56		First period	17:11 – David Wilkie (1)
Shane Churla (1) – 06:00; Adam Graves (4) – pp – 09:04; Adam Graves (5) – 13:43		Second period	No scoring
No scoring		Third period	09:38 – Saku Koivu (2); 16:16 – Pierre Turgeon (1)
Mike Richter 28 saves / 31 shots		Goalie stats	Jocelyn Thibault 15 saves / 19 shots

April 26	Montreal Canadiens	2–3	New York Rangers	Madison Square Garden	Recap
No scoring		First period	18:31 – sh – Jari Kurri (1)
No scoring		Second period	No scoring
Saku Koivu (3) – 06:09; Rory Fitzpatrick (1) – 16:22		Third period	00:13 – pp – Brian Leetch (1); 03:03 – Alexei Kovalev (1)
Jocelyn Thibault 39 saves / 42 shots		Goalie stats	Mike Richter 25 saves / 27 shots

April 28	New York Rangers	5–3	Montreal Canadiens	Centre Molson	Recap
Pat Verbeek (1) – 06:24; Adam Graves (6) – pp – 09:16; Alexei Kovalev (2) – 09:43; Jari Kurri (2) – 10:18		First period	12:41 – pp – Mark Recchi (3)
Doug Lidster (1) – pp – 11:33		Second period	02:11 – Pierre Turgeon (2)
No scoring		Third period	00:56 – Patrice Brisebois (1)
Mike Richter 27 saves / 30 shots		Goalie stats	Jocelyn Thibault 5 saves / 9 shots Pat Jablonski 16 saves / 17 shots

New York won series 4–2

==== (4) Florida Panthers vs. (5) Boston Bruins ====
This was the first playoff meeting between these two teams. This was the first time that Miami was represented in the Stanley Cup playoffs.

April 17	Boston Bruins	3–6	Florida Panthers	Miami Arena	Recap
Rick Tocchet (1) – pp – 15:04		First period	07:37 – Ray Sheppard (1); 08:02 – Mike Hough (1); 08:54 – Jody Hull (1)
Rick Tocchet (2) – pp – 03:16		Second period	05:08 – pp – Jason Woolley (1); 09:02 – pp – Ray Sheppard (2)
Sandy Moger (1) – 19:27		Third period	18:34 – Johan Garpenlov (1)
Bill Ranford 24 saves / 30 shots		Goalie stats	John Vanbiesbrouck 42 saves / 45 shots

April 22	Boston Bruins	2–6	Florida Panthers	Miami Arena	Recap
No scoring		First period	06:15 – Ed Jovanovski (2)
Ray Bourque (1) – pp – 07:49; Steve Heinze (1) – pp – 18:39		Second period	04:15 – pp – Ray Sheppard (3); 08:31 – Dave Lowry (1); 11:40 – Dave Lowry (2)
No scoring		Third period	14:41 – Jason Woolley (2); 15:34 – Johan Garpenlov (2)
Craig Billington 22 saves / 28 shots		Goalie stats	John Vanbiesbrouck 37 saves / 39 shots

April 24	Florida Panthers	4–2	Boston Bruins	Fleet Center	Recap
Jody Hull (2) – 00:30; Scott Mellanby (1) – pp – 10:29; Mike Hough (2) – 12:19		First period	No scoring
Jody Hull (3) – 15:16		Second period	18:40 – Shawn McEachern (1)
No scoring		Third period	19:02 – pp – Rick Tocchet (3)
John Vanbiesbrouck 40 saves / 42 shots		Goalie stats	Bill Ranford 22 saves / 26 shots

April 25	Florida Panthers	2–6	Boston Bruins	Fleet Center	Recap
No scoring		First period	04:48 – Adam Oates (1)
Bill Lindsay (1) – 02:49		Second period	05:07 – Jon Rohloff (1); 05:49 – Rick Tocchet (4); 10:54 – Cam Stewart (1)
Ray Sheppard (4) – 01:58		Third period	05:35 – sh – Adam Oates (2); 16:26 – Shawn McEachern (2)
John Vanbiesbrouck 18 saves / 22 shots Mark Fitzpatrick 9 saves / 11 shots		Goalie stats	Bill Ranford 18 saves / 20 shots

April 27	Boston Bruins	3–4	Florida Panthers	Miami Arena	Recap
Ted Donato (1) – pp – 16:31		First period	03:03 – Brian Skrudland (1); 08:11 – Paul Laus (1)
Jozef Stumpel (1) – 09:33		Second period	16:42 – pp – Dave Lowry (3)
Sandy Moger (2) – pp – 12:29		Third period	15:03 – Bill Lindsay (2)
Bill Ranford 32 saves / 36 shots		Goalie stats	John Vanbiesbrouck 26 saves / 29 shots

Florida won series 4–1

=== Western Conference quarterfinals ===
==== (1) Detroit Red Wings vs. (8) Winnipeg Jets ====
This was the first playoff meeting between these two teams. This was the final playoff series for the Winnipeg Jets until 2015. Game six was the final NHL game played at the Winnipeg Arena.

April 17	Winnipeg Jets	1–4	Detroit Red Wings	Joe Louis Arena	Recap
Alexei Zhamnov (1) – 10:06		First period	No scoring
No scoring		Second period	No scoring
No scoring		Third period	02:27 – Kris Draper (1); 04:06 – Viacheslav Fetisov (1); 04:48 – Greg Johnson (1); 08:07 – pp – Paul Coffey (1)
Nikolai Khabibulin 30 saves / 34 shots		Goalie stats	Chris Osgood 13 saves / 14 shots

April 19	Winnipeg Jets	0–4	Detroit Red Wings	Joe Louis Arena	Recap
No scoring		First period	06:35 – sh – Paul Coffey (2)
No scoring		Second period	04:56 – sh – Doug Brown (1); 12:26 – Kris Draper (2); 14:49 – pp – Igor Larionov (1)
No scoring		Third period	No scoring
Nikolai Khabibulin 30 saves / 34 shots		Goalie stats	Chris Osgood 16 saves / 16 shots

April 21	Detroit Red Wings	1–4	Winnipeg Jets	Winnipeg Arena	Recap
No scoring		First period	16:03 – Keith Tkachuk (1)
No scoring		Second period	No scoring
Igor Larionov (1) – 02:39		Third period	11:40 – Chad Kilger (1); 15:25 – Eddie Olczyk (1); 18:03 – Dave Manson (1)
Mike Vernon 21 saves / 25 shots		Goalie stats	Nikolai Khabibulin 32 saves / 33 shots

April 23	Detroit Red Wings	6–1	Winnipeg Jets	Winnipeg Arena	Recap
Vladimir Konstantinov (1) – 01:22		First period	No scoring
Igor Larionov (3) – pp – 05:39; Vyacheslav Kozlov (1) – pp – 07:22; Dino Ciccarelli (1) – pp – 19:05		Second period	04:09 – Craig Janney (1)
Greg Johnson (2) – 05:42; Steve Yzerman (1) – pp – 10:42		Third period	No scoring
Mike Vernon 19 saves / 20 shots		Goalie stats	Nikolai Khabibulin 29 saves / 35 shots

April 26	Winnipeg Jets	3–1	Detroit Red Wings	Joe Louis Arena	Recap
No scoring		First period	No scoring
Darrin Shannon (1) – 04:09		Second period	08:57 – pp – Dino Ciccarelli (2)
Dave Manson (2) – 06:52; Alexei Zhamnov (2) – en – 19:19		Third period	No scoring
Nikolai Khabibulin 51 saves / 52 shots		Goalie stats	Chris Osgood 16 saves / 18 shots

April 28	Detroit Red Wings	4–1	Winnipeg Jets	Winnipeg Arena	Recap
Vyacheslav Kozlov (2) – 03:46; Vyacheslav Kozlov (3) – pp – 14:54; Steve Yzerman (2) – 16:31		First period	No scoring
No scoring		Second period	No scoring
Keith Primeau (1) – en – 19:45		Third period	08:22 – Norm Maciver (1)
Mike Vernon 12 saves / 13 shots		Goalie stats	Nikolai Khabibulin 23 saves / 26 shots

Detroit won series 4–2

==== (2) Colorado Avalanche vs. (7) Vancouver Canucks ====
This was the first playoff meeting between these two teams. This series marked the first appearance of a team representing Colorado in the Stanley Cup playoffs in 18 years. The most recent team to represent Colorado prior to this was the Colorado Rockies who lost in the preliminary round in 1978.

April 16	Vancouver Canucks	2–5	Colorado Avalanche	McNichols Sports Arena	Recap
Russ Courtnall (1) – 11:30		First period	16:52 – Peter Forsberg (1)
Esa Tikkanen (1) – 13:03		Second period	00:28 – Joe Sakic (1); 00:53 – Valeri Kamensky (1); 10:32 – pp – Sandis Ozolinsh (1); 16:47 – Peter Forsberg (2)
No scoring		Third period	No scoring
Kirk McLean 9 saves / 12 shots Corey Hirsch 13 saves / 15 shots		Goalie stats	Patrick Roy 29 saves / 31 shots

April 18	Vancouver Canucks	5–4	Colorado Avalanche	McNichols Sports Arena	Recap
Gino Odjick (1) – 03:00; Alexander Mogilny (1) – 06:09		First period	00:59 – Peter Forsberg (3); 04:52 – Mike Ricci (1); 09:57 – pp – Sandis Ozolinsh (2)
Trevor Linden (1) – 04:08; Martin Gelinas (1) – 10:41		Second period	No scoring
Gino Odjick (2) – 02:20		Third period	10:06 – Joe Sakic (2)
Corey Hirsch 28 saves / 32 shots		Goalie stats	Patrick Roy 24 saves / 29 shots

April 20	Colorado Avalanche	4–0	Vancouver Canucks	General Motors Place	Recap
Peter Forsberg (3) – pp – 11:49		First period	No scoring
Valeri Kamensky (2) – pp – 04:19; Claude Lemieux (1) – pp – 08:27		Second period	No scoring
Scott Young (1) – 11:58		Third period	No scoring
Patrick Roy 28 saves / 28 shots		Goalie stats	Corey Hirsch 27 saves / 31 shots

April 22	Colorado Avalanche	3–4	Vancouver Canucks	General Motors Place	Recap
Mike Keane (1) – 14:43		First period	16:39 – pp – Esa Tikkanen (2)
Adam Deadmarsh (1) – 03:46		Second period	08:30 – pp – Jyrki Lumme (1); 13:18 – Josef Beranek (1); 19:40 – Gino Odjick (3)
Joe Sakic (3) – 06:36		Third period	No scoring
Patrick Roy 22 saves / 26 shots		Goalie stats	Corey Hirsch 30 saves / 33 shots

April 25	Vancouver Canucks	4–5	OT	Colorado Avalanche	McNichols Sports Arena	Recap
Josef Beranek (2) – 15:15		First period		09:07 – pp – Joe Sakic (4)
Trevor Linden (2) – pp – 14:29; Trevor Linden (3) – pp – 15:56		Second period		08:17 – Valeri Kamensky (3)
Trevor Linden (4) – 10:08		Third period		09:12 – Rene Corbet (1); 14:07 – pp – Joe Sakic (5)
No scoring		First overtime period		00:51 – Joe Sakic (6)
Corey Hirsch 28 saves / 33 saves		Goalie stats		Patrick Roy 16 saves / 20 shots Stephane Fiset 0 saves / 0 shots

April 27	Colorado Avalanche	3–2	Vancouver Canucks	General Motors Place	Recap
No scoring		First period	No scoring
Curtis Leschyshyn (1) – 04:29; Claude Lemieux (2) – pp – 12:06		Second period	03:43 – pp – Markus Naslund (1); 10:45 – pp – Esa Tikkanen (3)
Joe Sakic (7) – 17:18		Third period	No scoring
Patrick Roy 20 saves / 22 shots		Goalie stats	Corey Hirsch 19 saves / 22 shots

Colorado won series 4–2

==== (3) Chicago Blackhawks vs. (6) Calgary Flames ====
This was the third playoff meeting between these two teams; with Calgary winning both previous series. They last met in the 1989 Clarence Campbell Conference final, which Calgary won in five games.

April 17	Calgary Flames	1–4	Chicago Blackhawks	United Center	Recap
Sheldon Kennedy (1) – 03:23		First period	04:33 – pp – Bernie Nicholls (1); 15:34 – Joe Murphy (1)
No scoring		Second period	07:05 – Joe Murphy (2)
No scoring		Third period	00:31 – Eric Daze (1)
Trevor Kidd 22 saves / 26 shots		Goalie stats	Ed Belfour 19 saves / 20 shots

April 19	Calgary Flames	0–3	Chicago Blackhawks	United Center	Recap
No scoring		First period	18:09 – pp – Gary Suter (1)
No scoring		Second period	13:50 – Jeremy Roenick (1); 17:00 – Jeff Shantz (1)
No scoring		Third period	No scoring
Rick Tabaracci 29 saves / 32 shots		Goalie stats	Ed Belfour 33 saves / 33 shots

April 21	Chicago Blackhawks	7–5	Calgary Flames	Canadian Airlines Saddledome	Recap
James Black (1) – 07:15; Eric Daze (2) – 19:03		First period	No scoring
Tony Amonte (1) – pp – 01:52; Eric Weinrich (1) – pp – 02:29; Brent Sutter (1) – 03:17		Second period	12:24 – Theoren Fleury (1)
Eric Daze (3) – 13:12; Joe Murphy (3) – 13:40		Third period	01:27 – Theoren Fleury (2); 03:07 – Steve Chiasson (1); 05:51 – Cory Stillman (1); 18:50 – Steve Chiasson (2)
Ed Belfour 28 saves / 33 shots		Goalie stats	Trevor Kidd 9 saves / 14 shots Rick Tabaracci 7 saves / 9 shots

April 23	Chicago Blackhawks	2–1	3OT	Calgary Flames	Canadian Airlines Saddledome	Recap
No scoring		First period		No scoring
No scoring		Second period		05:53 – Jarome Iginla (1)
Jeremy Roenick (2) – 19:51		Third period		No scoring
Joe Murphy (4) – 10:02		Third overtime period		No scoring
Ed Belfour 55 saves / 56 shots		Goalie stats		Rick Tabaracci 41 saves / 43 shots

Chicago won series 4–0

==== (4) Toronto Maple Leafs vs. (5) St. Louis Blues ====
This was the fifth playoff meeting between these two teams: with the teams splitting the four previous playoff series. They last met in the 1993 Norris Division Finals, which Toronto won in seven games. Game five was the last playoff game at Maple Leaf Gardens.

April 16	St. Louis Blues	3–1	Toronto Maple Leafs	Maple Leaf Gardens	Recap
Shayne Corson (1) – pp – 15:13		First period	09:49 – pp – Mats Sundin (1)
No scoring		Second period	No scoring
Brett Hull (1) – 11:13; Stephen Leach (1) – 12:32		Third period	No scoring
Grant Fuhr 33 saves / 34 shots		Goalie stats	Felix Potvin 26 saves / 29 shots

April 18	St. Louis Blues	4–5	OT	Toronto Maple Leafs	Maple Leaf Gardens	Recap
Shayne Corson – pp – 16:51		First period		10:24 – Mike Gartner (1); 14:42 – Wendel Clark (1); 18:40 – Mats Sundin (2)
Charlie Huddy (1) – 03:50; Murray Baron (1) – sh – 18:26		Second period		No scoring
Brett Hull (2) – pp – 10:44		Third period		14:10 – pp – Kirk Muller (1)
No scoring		First overtime period		04:02 – pp – Mats Sundin (3)
Jon Casey 23 saves / 28 shots Grant Fuhr 11 saves / 11 shots		Goalie stats		Felix Potvin 30 saves / 34 shots

April 21	Toronto Maple Leafs	2–3	OT	St. Louis Blues	Kiel Center	Recap
Kirk Muller (2) – pp – 16:04		First period		No scoring
Mark Kolesar (1) – sh – 03:53		Second period		10:28 – Brian Noonan (1); 12:31 – pp – Peter Zezel (1)
No scoring		Third period		No scoring
No scoring		First overtime period		01:24 – Glenn Anderson (1)
Felix Potvin 37 saves / 40 shots Don Beaupre 0 saves / 0 shots		Goalie stats		Jon Casey 19 saves / 21 shots

April 23	Toronto Maple Leafs	1–5	St. Louis Blues	Kiel Center	Recap
No scoring		First period	08:42 – sh – Shayne Corson (3)
No scoring		Second period	00:45 – Shayne Corson (4); 19:54 – sh – Brett Hull (3)
Kirk Muller (3) – 17:32		Third period	07:02 – Brian Noonan (2); 16:11 – Brain Noonan (3)
Felix Potvin 18 saves / 21 shots Don Beaupre 11 saves / 13 shots		Goalie stats	Jon Casey 41 saves / 42 shots

April 25	St. Louis Blues	4–5	OT	Toronto Maple Leafs	Maple Leaf Gardens	Recap
Shayne Corson (5) – pp – 02:31; Chris Pronger (1) – 06:42		First period		10:42 – pp – Mike Gartner (2); 11:55 – pp – Doug Gilmour (1); 14:42 – Todd Warriner (1)
Peter Zezel (2) – 02:33		Second period		18:04 – Mike Gartner (3)
Al MacInnis (1) – pp – 19:47		Third period		No scoring
No scoring		First overtime period		07:31 – pp – Mike Gartner (4)
Jon Casey 35 saves / 40 shots		Goalie stats		Felix Potvin 35 saves / 39 shots

April 27	Toronto Maple Leafs	1–2	St. Louis Blues	Kiel Center	Recap
No scoring		First period	No scoring
Wendel Clark (2) – pp – 07:55		Second period	No scoring
No scoring		Third period	Al MacInnis (2) – 01:40; Stephen Leach (2) – 14:03
Felix Potvin 33 saves / 35 shots		Goalie stats	Jon Casey 23 saves / 24 shots

St. Louis won series 4–2

== Conference semifinals ==
=== Eastern Conference semifinals ===
==== (1) Philadelphia Flyers vs. (4) Florida Panthers ====
This was the first playoff meeting between these two teams. Game five was the last game played at the CoreStates Spectrum.

May 2	Florida Panthers	2–0	Philadelphia Flyers	CoreStates Spectrum	Recap
No scoring		First period	No scoring
Stu Barnes (1) – 05:56		Second period	No scoring
Dave Lowry (4) – pp – 15:50		Third period	No scoring
John Vanbiesbrouck 18 saves / 18 shots		Goalie stats	Ron Hextall 13 saves / 15 shots

May 4	Florida Panthers	2–3	Philadelphia Flyers	CoreStates Spectrum	Recap
Ray Sheppard (5) – 19:37		First period	No scoring
No scoring		Second period	04:47 – Karl Dykhuis (2); 15:39 – pp – John LeClair (5)
Dave Lowry (5) – pp – 04:36		Third period	09:11 – Eric Lindros (4)
John Vanbiesbrouck 44 saves / 47 shots		Goalie stats	Ron Hextall 24 saves / 26 shots

May 7	Philadelphia Flyers	3–1	Florida Panthers	Miami Arena	Recap
Dan Quinn (1) – pp – 16:19; Eric Lindros (5) – pp – 17:13		First period	No scoring
No scoring		Second period	07:34 – Paul Laus (2)
Trent Klatt (4) – 06:36		Third period	No scoring
Ron Hextall 24 saves / 25 shots		Goalie stats	John Vanbiesbrouck 31 saves / 34 shots

May 9	Philadelphia Flyers	3–4	OT	Florida Panthers	Miami Arena	Recap
No scoring		First period		01:02 – Rob Niedermayer (1); 08:23 – pp – Rob Niedermayer (2)
Mikael Renberg (2) – 16:18; Rod Brind'Amour (2) – pp – 17:36		Second period		19:54 – Stu Barnes (2)
Mikael Renberg (3) – 18:53		Third period		No scoring
No scoring		First overtime period		04:06 – Dave Lowry (6)
Ron Hextall 28 saves / 32 shots		Goalie stats		John Vanbiesbrouck 43 saves / 46 shots

May 12	Florida Panthers	2–1	2OT	Philadelphia Flyers	CoreStates Spectrum	Recap
No scoring		First period		No scoring
No scoring		Second period		07:02 – pp – Eric Lindros (6)
Stu Barnes (3) – 02:39		Third period		No scoring
Mike Hough (3) – 08:05		Second overtime period		No scoring
John Vanbiesbrouck 34 saves / 35 shots		Goalie stats		Ron Hextall 40 saves / 42 shots

May 14	Philadelphia Flyers	1–4	Florida Panthers	Miami Arena	Recap
No scoring		First period	14:54 – sh – Bill Lindsay (3)
No scoring		Second period	No scoring
John LeClair (6) – 15:43		Third period	02:55 – pp – Rob Niedermayer (3); 11:12 – Dave Lowry (7); 18:35 – en – Johan Garpenlov (3)
Ron Hextall 26 saves / 29 shots Garth Snow 0 saves / 0 shots		Goalie stats	John Vanbiesbrouck 34 saves / 35 shots

Florida won series 4–2

==== (2) Pittsburgh Penguins vs. (3) New York Rangers ====
This was the third playoff meeting between these two teams; with Pittsburgh winning both previous series. They last met in the 1992 Patrick Division Finals, which Pittsburgh won in six games.

May 3	New York Rangers	3–4	Pittsburgh Penguins	Civic Arena	Recap
No scoring		First period	No scoring
Niklas Sundstrom (2) – 13:52		Second period	05:41 – pp – Jaromir Jagr (4); 16:32 – Jaromir Jagr (5)
Pat Verbeek (2) – 03:22; Mark Messier (2) – 06:44		Third period	07:44 – Dave Roche (2); 12:43 – Mario Lemieux (3)
Mike Richter 25 saves / 29 shots		Goalie stats	Ken Wregget 26 saves / 29 shots

May 5	New York Rangers	6–3	Pittsburgh Penguins	Civic Arena	Recap
Luc Robitaille (1) – 05:10; Bill Berg (1) – 17:26		First period	No scoring
Alexei Kovalev (3) – 01:25; Mark Messier (3) – 06:33; Pat Verbeek (3) – pp – 15:17		Second period	06:21 – pp – Mario Lemieux (4)
Jari Kurri (3) – en – 19:20		Third period	06:27 – Bryan Smolinski (2); 14:19 – pp – Jaromir Jagr (6)
Mike Richter 25 saves / 28 shots		Goalie stats	Ken Wregget 26 saves / 31 shots

May 7	Pittsburgh Penguins	3–2	New York Rangers	Madison Square Garden	Recap
Mario Lemieux (5) – 06:33; Mario Lemieux (6) – 10:18; Tomas Sandstrom (2) – 15:25		First period	No scoring
No scoring		Second period	03:02 – Shane Churla (2); 03:36 – Niklas Sundstrom (3)
No scoring		Third period	No scoring
Ken Wregget 37 saves / 39 shots		Goalie stats	Mike Richter 29 saves / 32 shots

May 9	Pittsburgh Penguins	4–1	New York Rangers	Madison Square Garden	Recap
Jaromir Jagr (7) – 04:35		First period	No scoring
Petr Nedved (7) – 01:27		Second period	06:28 – pp – Adam Graves (7)
Glen Murray (2) – 12:19; Mario Lemieux (7) – en – 19:31		Third period	No scoring
Ken Wregget 40 saves / 41 shots		Goalie stats	Mike Richter 27 saves / 30 shots

May 11	New York Rangers	3–7	Pittsburgh Penguins	Civic Arena	Recap
No scoring		First period	11:49 – sh – Mario Lemieux (8)
Mark Messier (4) – pp – 05:50; Sergio Momesso (3) – 10:39; Niklas Sundstrom (4) – pp – 13:26		Second period	02:35 – pp – Jaromir Jagr (8); 09:53 – pp – Mario Lemieux (9); 15:04 – Jaromir Jagr (9); 19:47 – Jaromir Jagr (10)
No scoring		Third period	07:23 – Bryan Smolinski (3); 15:14 – Mario Lemieux (10)
Mike Richter 17 saves / 24 shots		Goalie stats	Ken Wregget 29 saves / 32 shots

Pittsburgh won series 4–1

=== Western Conference semifinals ===
==== (1) Detroit Red Wings vs. (5) St. Louis Blues ====
This was the fourth playoff meeting between these two teams; with St. Louis winning two of the three previous series. They last met in the 1991 Norris Division Semifinals, which St. Louis won in seven games.

May 3	St. Louis Blues	2–3	Detroit Red Wings	Joe Louis Arena	Recap
No scoring		First period	15:17 – pp – Dino Ciccarelli (3)
Shayne Corson (6) – pp – 11:03		Second period	18:21 – Darren McCarty (1)
Brett Hull (4) – pp – 02:19		Third period	17:54 – Sergei Fedorov (1)
Jon Casey 25 saves / 28 shots		Goalie stats	Chris Osgood 31 saves / 33 shots

May 5	St. Louis Blues	3–8	Detroit Red Wings	Joe Louis Arena	Recap
Shayne Corson (7) – pp – 13:37		First period	03:40 – Steve Yzerman (3); 04:45 – Vladimir Konstantinov (2); 07:02 – Nicklas Lidstrom (1); 11:41 – Darren McCarty (2); 15:40 – Martin Lapointe (1)
Peter Zezel (3) – 02:48		Second period	No scoring
Adam Creighton (1) – 08:03		Third period	06:19 – pp – Nicklas Lidstrom (2); 17:56 – pp – Steve Yzerman (4); 19:35 – pp – Marc Bergevin (1)
Jon Casey 23 saves / 31 shots Bruce Racine 0 saves / 0 shots		Goalie stats	Chris Osgood 18 saves / 21 shots

May 8	Detroit Red Wings	4–5	OT	St. Louis Blues	Kiel Center	Recap
Vladimir Konstantinov (3) – 01:34		First period		04:43 – Al MacInnis (3); 05:05 – Brian Noonan (4); 07:58 – pp – Shayne Corson (8)
Steve Yzerman (5) – pp – 02:57; Steve Yzerman (6) – 08:56		Second period		No scoring
Steve Yzerman (7) – pp – 03:08		Third period		08:46 – Tony Twist (1)
No scoring		First overtime period		3:23 – Igor Kravchuk (1)
Mike Vernon 18 saves / 23 shots		Goalie stats		Jon Casey 30 saves / 34 shots

May 10	Detroit Red Wings	0–1	St. Louis Blues	Kiel Center	Recap
No scoring		First period	No scoring
No scoring		Second period	04:40 – pp – Wayne Gretzky (1)
No scoring		Third period	No scoring
Chris Osgood 14 saves / 15 shots		Goalie stats	Jon Casey 29 saves / 29 shots

May 12	St. Louis Blues	3–2	Detroit Red Wings	Joe Louis Arena	Recap
Brett Hull (5) – 05:15		First period	No scoring
Wayne Gretzky (2) – 18:46		Second period	03:05 – Kris Draper (3)
Yuri Khmylev (1) – 09:11		Third period	10:23 – Vyacheslav Kozlov (4)
Jon Casey 37 saves / 39 shots		Goalie stats	Chris Osgood 18 saves / 21 shots

May 14	Detroit Red Wings	4–2	St. Louis Blues	Kiel Center	Recap
Igor Larionov (4) – 10:17; Kris Draper (4) – sh – 14:05		First period	No scoring
No scoring		Second period	No scoring
Dino Ciccarelli (4) – pp – 09:15; Nicklas Lidstrom (3) – 19:31		Third period	15:13 – pp – Stephen Leach (3); 16:12 – Brett Hull (6)
Chris Osgood 18 saves / 20 shots		Goalie stats	Jon Casey 18 saves / 22 shots

May 16	St. Louis Blues	0–1	2OT	Detroit Red Wings	Joe Louis Arena	Recap
No scoring		First period		No scoring
No scoring		Second period		No scoring
No scoring		Third period		No scoring
No scoring		Second overtime period		01:15 – Steve Yzerman (8)
Jon Casey 39 saves / 40 shots		Goalie stats		Chris Osgood 29 saves / 29 shots

Detroit won series 4–3

==== (2) Colorado Avalanche vs. (3) Chicago Blackhawks ====
This was the first playoff meeting between these two teams.

May 2	Chicago Blackhawks	3–2	OT	Colorado Avalanche	McNichols Sports Arena	Recap
Enrico Ciccone (1) – 02:02		First period		No scoring
No scoring		Second period		03:10 – Claude Lemieux (3); 04:25 – Joe Sakic (8)
Murray Craven (1) – pp – 01:58		Third period		No scoring
Jeremy Roenick (3) – pp – 06:29		First overtime period		No scoring
Ed Belfour 28 saves / 30 shots		Goalie stats		Patrick Roy 23 saves / 26 shots

May 4	Chicago Blackhawks	1–5	Colorado Avalanche	McNichols Sports Arena	Recap
Tony Amonte (2) – 04:28		First period	11:38 – pp – Valeri Kamensky (4); 12:48 – Craig Wolanin (1); 13:41 – Joe Sakic (9); 16:22 – Uwe Krupp (1)
No scoring		Second period	15:14 – pp – Adam Deadmarsh (2)
No scoring		Third period	No scoring
Jeff Hackett 27 saves / 32 shots		Goalie stats	Patrick Roy 30 saves / 31 shots

May 6	Colorado Avalanche	3–4	OT	Chicago Blackhawks	United Center	Recap
No scoring		First period		10:39 – pp – Gary Suter (2)
Peter Forsberg (5) – 04:31; Mike Ricci (2) – 12:53; Joe Sakic (10) – pp – 18:37		Second period		19:23 – Joe Murphy (5)
No scoring		Third period		06:48 – Jeremy Roenick (4)
No scoring		First overtime period		00:46 – Sergei Krivokrasov (1)
Patrick Roy 21 saves / 25 shots		Goalie stats		Ed Belfour 18 saves / 21 shots

May 8	Colorado Avalanche	3–2	3OT	Chicago Blackhawks	United Center	Recap
No scoring		First period		No scoring
Joe Sakic (11) – 01:41		Second period		04:40 – Gary Suter (3)
Valeri Kamensky (5) – pp – 03:49		Third period		06:15 – Jeff Shantz (2)
Joe Sakic (12) – 04:33		Third overtime period		No scoring
Patrick Roy 32 saves / 34 shots		Goalie stats		Ed Belfour 54 saves / 57 shots

May 11	Chicago Blackhawks	1–4	Colorado Avalanche	McNichols Sports Arena	Recap
No scoring		First period	14:33 – Chris Simon (1)
No scoring		Second period	12:37 – Valeri Kamensky (6)
Jeremy Roenick (5) – 14:42		Third period	05:19 – Scott Young (2); 16:43 – Valeri Kamensky (7)
Ed Belfour 24 saves / 28 shots		Goalie stats	Patrick Roy 22 saves / 23 shots

May 13	Colorado Avalanche	4–3	2OT	Chicago Blackhawks	United Center	Recap
Valeri Kamensky (8) – 04:55		First period		12:10 – Denis Savard (1)
No scoring		Second period		19:36 – Bernie Nicholls (2)
Joe Sakic (13) – pp – 01:29; Valeri Kamensky (9) – 07:02		Third period		19:00 – Joe Murphy (6)
Sandis Ozolinsh (3) – 05:18		Second overtime period		No scoring
Patrick Roy 31 saves / 34 shots		Goalie stats		Ed Belfour 41 saves / 45 shots

Colorado won series 4–2

== Conference finals ==
=== Eastern Conference final ===
==== (2) Pittsburgh Penguins vs. (4) Florida Panthers ====
This was the first playoff meeting between these two teams. This was Pittsburgh's third Conference Final appearance. They last made the Conference Final in 1992, where they defeated the Boston Bruins in four games. This was Florida's first Conference Final appearance in their third season since entering the league as an expansion team in 1993.

Despite being outshot 33–25 in game one, the Panthers came out on top with an impressive 5–1 win. Florida goaltender John Vanbiesbrouck made 32 saves and Florida forward Tom Fitzgerald scored twice. The Penguins wanting to avoid going down two games to none against the Panthers came out with a better effort in game two and won the game 3–2 and evened the series at one game each. In game three, the Panthers fired an incredible 61 shots on Penguins goaltender Tom Barrasso and it paid off as the Panthers won 5–2 to take a 2–1 series lead, with Florida forward Stu Barnes scoring twice. Going into the third period of game four, the Penguins trailed 1–0. Pittsburgh tied the score on Brad Lauer's goal with 11:03 remaining in regulation, then Bryan Smolinski scored the go ahead goal with 3:31 to go to give the Penguins a 2–1 lead. Pittsburgh hung on to win the game 2–1 and tie the series at two games apiece. In game five, the Penguins shut-out the Panthers 3–0, with Tom Barrasso stopping all 28 Florida shots he faced.

Leading the series three games to two, Pittsburgh looked to advance to the Stanley Cup Final in game six. The Penguins led 2–1 in the second period, but the Panthers scored three of the next four goals and edged the Penguins 4–3 to tie the series at 3–3. In game seven, Florida took a 1–0 lead on Mike Hough's goal at 13:13 of the first period. After a scoreless second period, Pittsburgh tied the game on Petr Nedved's power-play goal at 1:23 of the third period. The Panthers regained the lead on Tom Fitzgerald's bizarre 58-foot slapshot at 6:18 and got an insurance goal from Johan Garpenlov at 17:23. Florida hung on to win the game 3–1 and the series four games to three, John Vanbiesbrouck making 39 saves in the victory. This was the last playoff series victory for the Panthers until 2022 when they beat the Washington Capitals in six games, and was their last appearance in the Conference Finals until 2023.

May 18	Florida Panthers	5–1	Pittsburgh Penguins	Civic Arena	Recap
Dave Lowry (8) – pp – 01:52; Tom Fitzgerald (1) – 16:11		First period	No scoring
Tom Fitzgerald (2) – 07:12		Second period	No scoring
Dave Lowry (9) – 15:41; Scott Mellanby (2) – pp – 18:48		Third period	07:03 – Kevin Miller (2)
John Vanbiesbrouck 32 saves / 33 shots		Goalie stats	Ken Wregget 20 saves / 25 shots

May 20	Florida Panthers	2–3	Pittsburgh Penguins	Civic Arena	Recap
No scoring		First period	No scoring
No scoring		Second period	07:31 – pp – Sergei Zubov (1); 13:57 – pp – Jaromir Jagr (11)
Ray Sheppard (6) – 00:29; Bill Lindsay (4) – 12:19		Third period	08:12 – Mario Lemieux (11)
John Vanbiesbrouck 35 saves / 38 shots		Goalie stats	Tom Barrasso 30 saves / 32 shots

May 24	Pittsburgh Penguins	2–5	Florida Panthers	Miami Arena	Recap
Bryan Smolinski (4) – 16:02		First period	01:46 – Ray Sheppard (7)
Petr Nedved (8) – 00:27		Second period	03:51 – Radek Dvorak (1)
No scoring		Third period	00:55 – pp – Stu Barnes (4); 04:55 – Stu Barnes (5); 07:37 – Martin Straka (1)
Tom Barrasso 56 saves / 61 shots		Goalie stats	John Vanbiesbrouck 26 saves / 28 shots

May 26	Pittsburgh Penguins	2–1	Florida Panthers	Miami Arena	Recap
No scoring		First period	No scoring
No scoring		Second period	12:50 – Dave Lowry (10)
Brad Lauer (1) – 08:57; Bryan Smolinski (5) – 16:29		Third period	No scoring
Tom Barrasso 32 saves / 33 shots		Goalie stats	John Vanbiesbrouck 22 saves / 24 shots

May 28	Florida Panthers	0–3	Pittsburgh Penguins	Civic Arena	Recap
No scoring		First period	08:48 – pp – J. J. Daigneault (1)
No scoring		Second period	18:27 – Petr Nedved (9)
No scoring		Third period	18:42 – en – Tomas Sandstrom (3)
John Vanbiesbrouck 36 saves / 38 shots		Goalie stats	Tom Barrasso 28 saves / 28 shots

May 30	Pittsburgh Penguins	3–4	Florida Panthers	Miami Arena	Recap
No scoring		First period	07:45 – Scott Mellanby (3)
Kevin Miller (3) – 01:55; Joe Dziedzic (1) – 10:16		Second period	14:56 – Bill Lindsay (5)
Tomas Sandstrom (4) – 12:17		Third period	09:35 – Martin Straka (2); 13:58 – Rob Niedermayer (4)
Tom Barrasso 36 saves / 40 shots		Goalie stats	John Vanbiesbrouck 20 saves / 23 shots

June 1	Florida Panthers	3–1	Pittsburgh Penguins	Civic Arena	Recap
Mike Hough (4) – 13:13		First period	No scoring
No scoring		Second period	No scoring
Tom Fitzgerald (3) – 06:18; Johan Garpenlov (4) – 17:23		Third period	01:23 – pp – Petr Nedved (10)
John Vanbiesbrouck 39 saves / 40 shots		Goalie stats	Tom Barrasso 25 saves / 28 shots

Florida won series 4–3

=== Western Conference final ===
==== (1) Detroit Red Wings vs. (2) Colorado Avalanche ====
This was the first playoff meeting between these two teams. This was Detroit's second consecutive and fourth overall Conference Final appearance. They defeated the Chicago Blackhawks in the previous year in five games. This was Colorado's third Conference Final appearance in franchise history and first since relocating to Colorado. They last went to the Conference Final in 1985, which they lost to the Philadelphia Flyers in six games when the team was known as the Quebec Nordiques.

Game 1 was a hard-fought battle. The score was tied at two in the first overtime period when Mike Keane scored at 17:31 to give Colorado a 3–2 win. The Avalanche won Game 2, 3–0, with Colorado goaltender Patrick Roy stopping all 35 shots faced. Down two games to none, the Red Wings played solidly in Game 3. Detroit defencemen Nicklas Lidstrom and Vladimir Konstantinov combined to score three goals (including a shorthanded goal by Konstantinov) and Detroit won 6–4. In game four the Red Wings outshot the Avalanche 31–17 but lost the game 4–2 thanks to 29 saves made by Patrick Roy.

Detroit played with desperation and determination in game five. Inspired by Vladimir Konstantinov's big body check on Avalanche forward Claude Lemieux, the Red Wings went on to win 5–2. The Red Wings victory forced a Game 6 back in Colorado. Game 6 became famous in the history of the Red Wings-Avalanche rivalry. At 14:07 of the first period, Detroit forward Kris Draper was down along the half-boards at centre ice when Colorado forward Claude Lemieux checked Draper's head from behind into the edge of the bench. The hit sent Draper to the hospital with a broken jaw and a shattered cheek and orbital bone, which required surgery and stitches. Draper did not return to play until the middle of the 1996–97 season. While Lemieux was assessed a five-minute major penalty and a game misconduct match penalty for the hit, the Avalanche went on to win the game 4–1 and completed the upset. The controversial hit on Draper by Lemieux was a catalyst (along with a rough hit by Kozlov on Foote in Game 3) for the Detroit–Colorado rivalry that endured for a decade. In a 2021 Documentary, Lemieux and Draper moved past the incident and are now friends.

May 19	Colorado Avalanche	3–2	OT	Detroit Red Wings	Joe Louis Arena	Recap
No scoring		First period		06:00 – pp – Paul Coffey (3)
Stephane Yelle (1) – sh – 00:44		Second period		No scoring
Adam Deadmarsh (3) – 01:34		Third period		05:33 – sh – Paul Coffey (4)
Mike Keane (2) – 17:31		First overtime period		No scoring
Patrick Roy 29 saves / 31 shots		Goalie stats		Chris Osgood 27 saves / 30 shots

May 21	Colorado Avalanche	3–0	Detroit Red Wings	Joe Louis Arena	Recap
Joe Sakic (14) – pp – 11:36		First period	No scoring
Warren Rychel (1) – 05:45; Sandis Ozolinsh (4) – 08:03		Second period	No scoring
No scoring		Third period	No scoring
Patrick Roy 35 saves / 35 shots		Goalie stats	Chris Osgood 17 saves / 20 shots

May 23	Detroit Red Wings	6–4	Colorado Avalanche	McNichols Sports Arena	Recap
Darren McCarty (3) – 09:22; Nicklas Lidstrom (4) – 10:31		First period	15:37 – pp – Claude Lemieux (4)
Dino Ciccarelli (5) – pp – 05:36; Vladimir Konstantinov (4) – sh – 15:34; Igor Larionov (5) – pp – 17:41		Second period	05:56 – Sandis Ozolinsh (5); 19:44 – Adam Foote (1); 19:51 – Adam Deadmarsh (4)
Nicklas Lidstrom (5) – 00:32		Third period	No scoring
Chris Osgood 15 saves / 19 shots		Goalie stats	Patrick Roy 16 saves / 22 shots

May 25	Detroit Red Wings	2–4	Colorado Avalanche	McNichols Sports Arena	Recap
No scoring		First period	16:23 – Adam Deadmarsh (5)
Dino Ciccarelli (6) – pp – 04:17		Second period	07:20 – Joe Sakic (15)
Doug Brown (2) – 14:02		Third period	03:25 – pp – Uwe Krupp (2); 19:58 – en – Peter Forsberg (6)
Chris Osgood 13 saves / 16 shots		Goalie stats	Patrick Roy 29 saves / 31 shots

May 27	Colorado Avalanche	2–5	Detroit Red Wings	Joe Louis Arena	Recap
No scoring		First period	11:35 – Vyacheslav Kozlov (5); 12:39 – Igor Larionov (6)
Mike Ricci (3) – pp – 02:10; Mike Ricci (4) – pp – 08:00		Second period	04:18 – Sergei Fedorov (2); 12:15 – Doug Brown (3); 19:28 – Greg Johnson (3)
No scoring		Third period	No scoring
Patrick Roy 21 saves / 26 shots		Goalie stats	Chris Osgood 26 saves / 28 shots

May 29	Detroit Red Wings	1–4	Colorado Avalanche	McNichols Sports Arena	Recap
Paul Coffey (5) – pp – 15:36		First period	11:57 – Joe Sakic (16)
No scoring		Second period	05:55 – pp – Joe Sakic (17); 07:51 – pp – Mike Ricci (5); 16:44 – Peter Forsberg (7)
No scoring		Third period	No scoring
Chris Osgood 18 saves / 22 shots		Goalie stats	Patrick Roy 23 saves / 24 shots

Colorado won series 4–2

== Stanley Cup Final ==
Since the formation of the NHL in 1917 this was the only time to date that both teams competing in the Stanley Cup Final made their first appearance.

This was the first and to date only playoff series between these two teams. This was also the first Stanley Cup Final ever played in a Southern state. Colorado made their first Finals appearance in their first season in Denver, this was the franchise's seventeenth season in the league, while Florida made their first Finals appearance in just their third season of existence. Colorado became the third NHL team to win the Stanley Cup following a relocation, and the first to do so in their inaugural season after relocation. This was the Panthers' last Finals appearance until 2023. The Avalanche swept the Panthers to win not just their first Stanley Cup title in franchise history, but also the first major professional sports championship for the city of Denver.

June 4	Florida Panthers	1–3	Colorado Avalanche	McNichols Sports Arena	Recap
Tom Fitzgerald (4) – 16:51		First period	No scoring
No scoring		Second period	10:32 – Scott Young (3); 12:21 – Mike Ricci (6); 14:21 – Uwe Krupp (3)
No scoring		Third period	No scoring
John Vanbiesbrouck 27 saves / 30 shots		Goalie stats	Patrick Roy 25 saves / 26 shots

June 6	Florida Panthers	1–8	Colorado Avalanche	McNichols Sports Arena	Recap
Stu Barnes (6) – pp – 07:52		First period	04:11 – Peter Forsberg (8); 10:43 – pp – Rene Corbet (2); 13:46 – pp – Peter Forsberg (9); 15:05 – pp – Peter Forsberg (10)
No scoring		Second period	04:37 – Rene Corbet (3); 05:08 – Valeri Kamensky (10); 10:03 – Jon Klemm (1)
No scoring		Third period	17:28 – pp – Jon Klemm (2)
John Vanbiesbrouck 7 saves / 11 shots Mark Fitzpatrick 15 saves / 19 shots		Goalie stats	Patrick Roy 27 saves / 28 shots

June 8	Colorado Avalanche	3–2	Florida Panthers	Miami Arena	Recap
Claude Lemieux (5) – 02:44		First period	09:14 – pp – Ray Sheppard (8); 11:19 – Rob Niedermayer (5)
Mike Keane (3) – 01:38; Joe Sakic (18) – 03:00		Second period	No scoring
No scoring		Third period	No scoring
Patrick Roy 32 saves / 34 shots		Goalie stats	John Vanbiesbrouck 19 saves / 22 shots

June 10	Colorado Avalanche	1–0	3OT	Florida Panthers	Miami Arena	Recap
No scoring		First period		No scoring
No scoring		Second period		No scoring
No scoring		Third period		No scoring
Uwe Krupp (4) – 04:31		Third overtime period		No scoring
Patrick Roy 63 saves / 63 shots		Goalie stats		John Vanbiesbrouck 55 saves / 56 shots

Colorado won series 4–0

== Playoff statistics ==
=== Skaters ===
These are the top ten skaters based on points.

Player	Team	GP	G	A	Pts	+/–	PIM
Joe Sakic	Colorado Avalanche	22	18	16	34	+10	14
Mario Lemieux	Pittsburgh Penguins	18	11	16	27	+3	33
Jaromir Jagr	Pittsburgh Penguins	18	11	12	23	+7	18
Valeri Kamensky	Colorado Avalanche	22	10	12	22	+11	28
Peter Forsberg	Colorado Avalanche	22	10	11	21	+10	18
Petr Nedved	Pittsburgh Penguins	18	10	10	20	+3	16
Steve Yzerman	Detroit Red Wings	18	8	12	20	-1	4
Sergei Fedorov	Detroit Red Wings	19	2	18	20	+8	10
Sandis Ozolinsh	Colorado Avalanche	22	5	14	19	+5	16
Dave Lowry	Florida Panthers	22	10	7	17	+8	39

=== Goaltenders ===
This is a combined table of the top five goaltenders based on goals against average and the top five goaltenders based on save percentage, with at least 420 minutes played. The table is sorted by GAA, and the criteria for inclusion are bolded.

Player	Team	GP	W	L	SA	GA	GAA	SV%	SO	TOI
Ed Belfour	Chicago Blackhawks	9	6	3	323	23	**2.07**	**.929**	1	665:54
Patrick Roy	Colorado Avalanche	22	16	6	649	51	**2.10**	**.921**	3	1453:53
Chris Osgood	Detroit Red Wings	15	8	7	322	33	**2.12**	.898	2	935:48
Ron Hextall	Philadelphia Flyers	12	6	6	319	27	**2.13**	.915	0	759:41
John Vanbiesbrouck	Florida Panthers	22	12	10	735	50	**2.25**	**.932**	1	1331:31

== See also ==
- 1995–96 NHL season
- Red Wings-Avalanche brawl 1997

Preceded by 1995 Stanley Cup playoffs	Stanley Cup Champions	Succeeded by 1997 Stanley Cup playoffs
