= Colorado Avalanche–Detroit Red Wings brawl =

1997 NHL ice hockey melee

Avalanche–Red Wings brawl
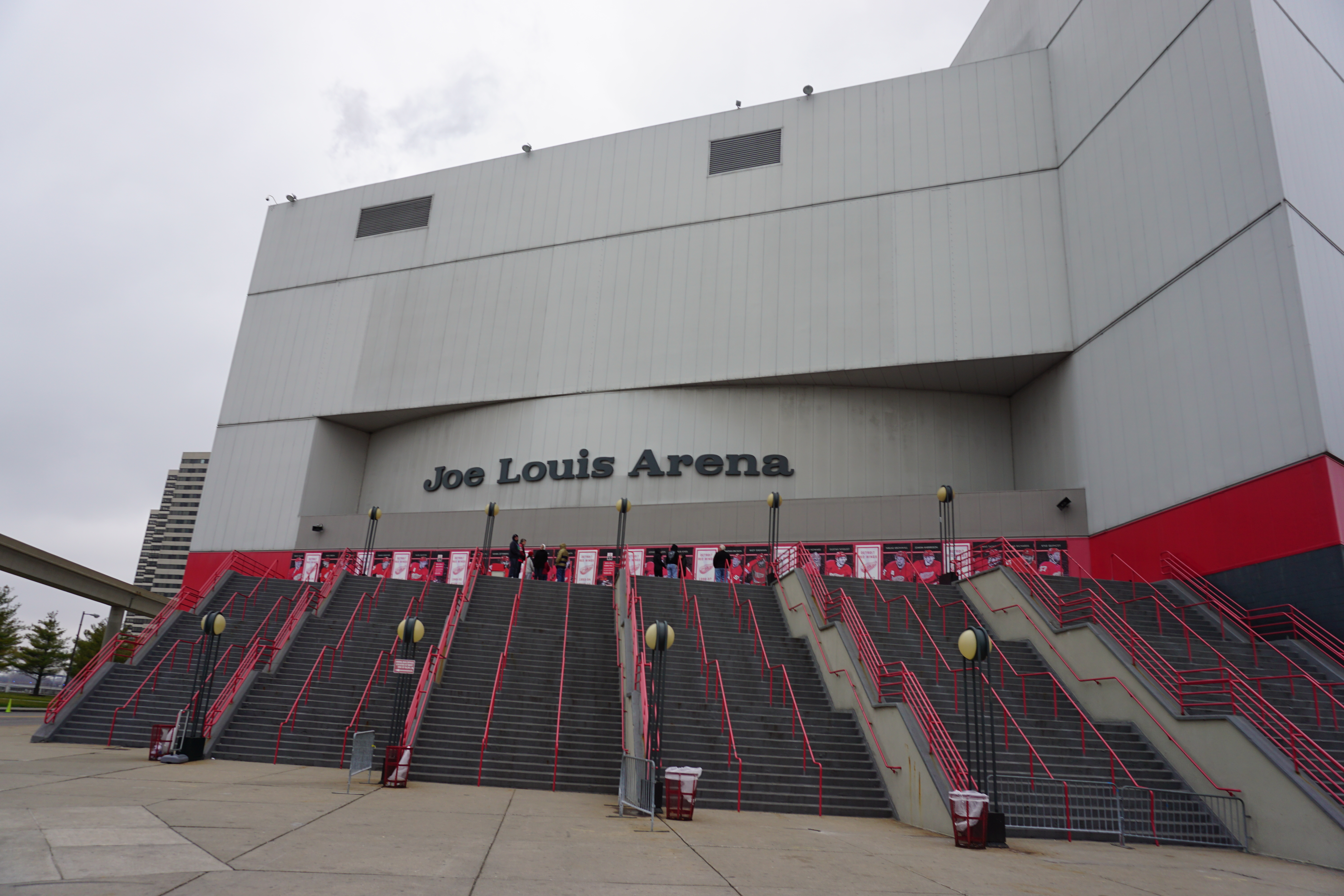
- Joe Louis Arena in Detroit, where the game took place.
	1	2	3	OT	Total
Colorado Avalanche	1	3	1	0	5
Detroit Red Wings	0	3	2	1	6
- Date: March 26, 1997
- Arena: Joe Louis Arena
- City: Detroit
- Attendance: 19,983

The Avalanche–Red Wings brawl was a large-scale on-ice melee that occurred on March 26, 1997, at Joe Louis Arena in Detroit, between two National Hockey League (NHL) rivals: the Colorado Avalanche and Detroit Red Wings. The brawl, which has been nicknamed Bloody Wednesday, Fight Night at the Joe and the Brawl in Hockeytown, stemmed from a previous on-ice incident between the two teams during the 1996 Western Conference Finals. The game featured 18 fighting major penalties and 144 minutes in penalties. Both the game and brawl are considered a defining moment in modern hockey history.

== Previous incident ==
In Game 6 of the 1996 Western Conference Finals, Avalanche right winger Claude Lemieux checked Red Wings center Kris Draper from behind, driving Draper's face into the boards. While not a specific retaliation, earlier in Game 3 of the series, Avalanche defenceman Adam Foote had been hit from behind into the glass by Red Wings winger Vyacheslav Kozlov, resulting in Foote receiving a gash on his forehead. The Avalanche were enraged Kozlov had not been penalized. Lemieux later sucker punched Kozlov, which resulted in him being fined and suspended for the following game.

Lemieux's hit on Draper in Game 6 sent Draper out of the game and into the hospital with a concussion, broken nose, broken jaw, shattered cheek and orbital bone which required reconstructive surgery involving his jaw being wired shut and numerous stitches. The Avalanche went on to upset the Red Wings in six games, eventually winning the Stanley Cup. After the traditional handshakes that take place after a playoff series, former Red Wings winger Dino Ciccarelli said of Lemieux, "I can't believe I shook this guy's friggin' hand after the game, that pisses me right off." Lemieux was fined and suspended for the first two games of the Stanley Cup Finals.

== Brawls ==
In the next regular season, although the two teams had played each other three times without serious incident, their fourth meeting on the night of March 26 was different.

Prior to the game, Red Wings head coach Scotty Bowman used Lemieux's hit on Draper and his lack of remorse as a rallying cry in order to get his team to add a physical edge to their game. On the day of the game, The Detroit News printed a "wanted" poster of Lemieux with a prison number under his photo under the headline "A Time for Revenge", and compared Lemieux to a carjacker.

As tensions mounted early in the first period, defencemen and enforcer Brent Severyn (Avalanche) and Jamie Pushor (Red Wings) fought at 4:45 of the first period, followed by a fight between forwards Kirk Maltby (Red Wings) and René Corbet (Avalanche) at 10:14 where Maltby dropped Corbet.

The major melee ensued at the 18:22 mark, leading to the third fight. Shortly after a collision between Red Wings center Igor Larionov and Avalanche forward Peter Forsberg where Forsberg knocked Larionov onto his backside away from the play in front of the Red Wings bench, Red Wings enforcer Darren McCarty seized the chance to avenge his Grind Line teammate by escaping from the grasps of Adam Foote and a linesman and turning to cold-cock Lemieux. McCarty laid many blows on Lemieux, who fell to the ice and covered his head; McCarty managed to land a few more punches, drag Lemieux to the boards and knee him in the head before the two were separated by officials.

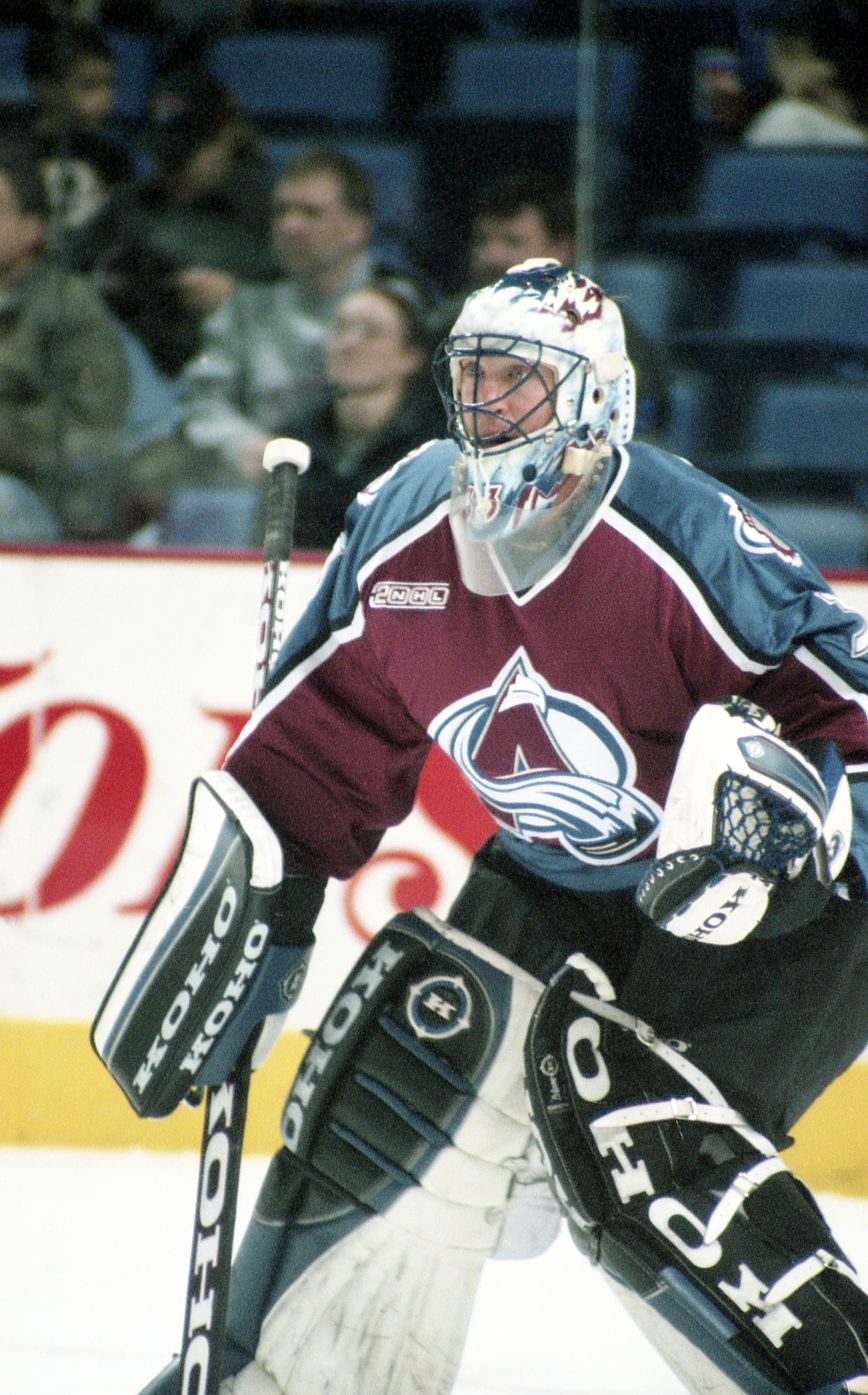
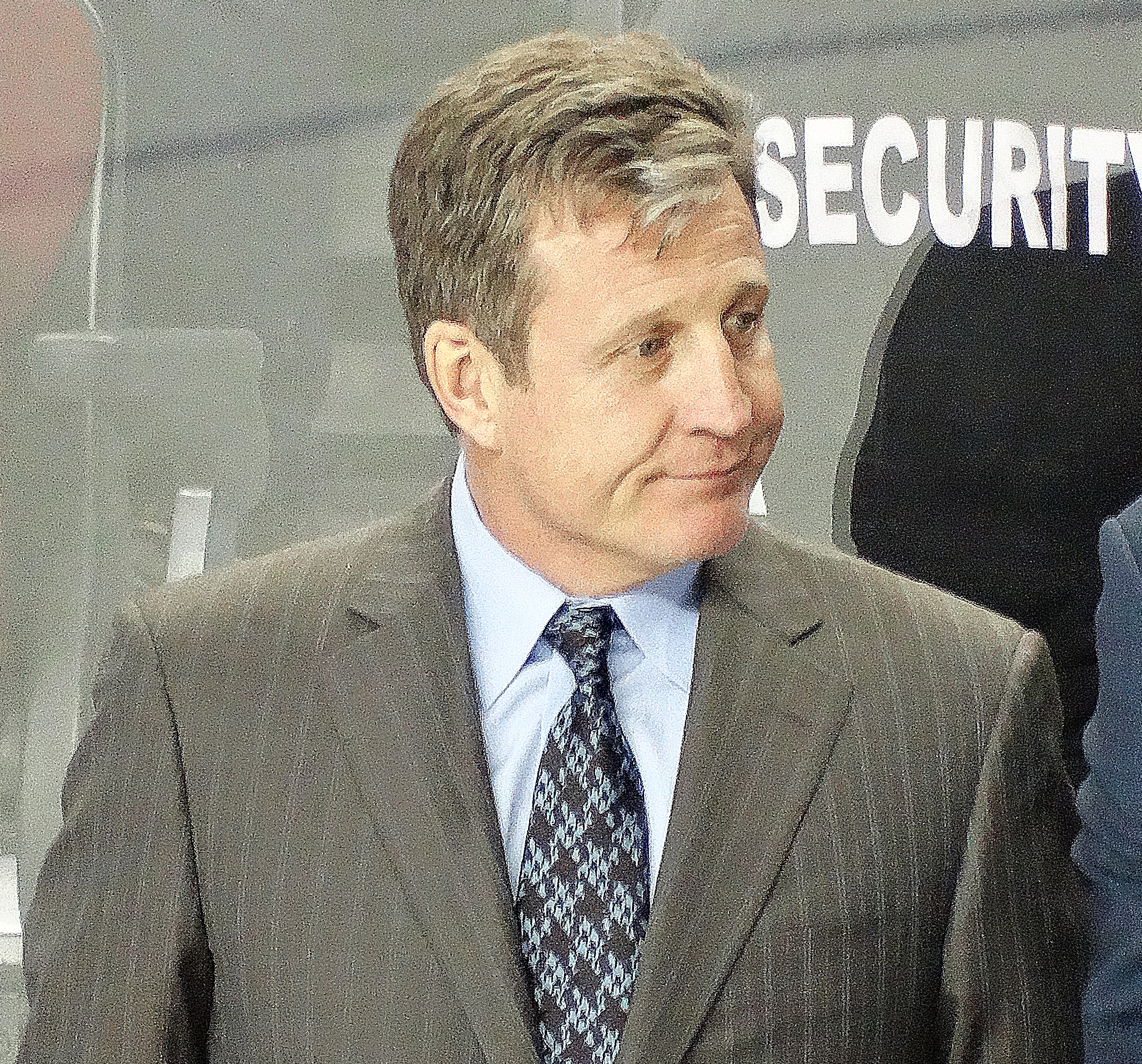
Patrick Roy (left) and Mike Vernon (right) engaged in what has been called one of the best "goalie fights" ever seen.

Seeing what McCarty was doing to Lemieux, Avalanche goaltender Patrick Roy skated out of his net to defend his teammate, but was intercepted by Red Wings forward Brendan Shanahan, who hit Roy with a vicious body check that sent him sprawling to the ice. While Shanahan and defenceman Adam Foote tangled, Red Wings goaltender Mike Vernon went out to center ice to try to grab Foote off of Shanahan. Roy saw this and got Vernon's attention by pulling him off his teammate, which ended up escalating to a fight when Vernon and Roy dropped their masks, gloves, and blockers. While the fight between Roy and Vernon wound down, McCarty dragged Lemieux's body to where Draper was standing on the Red Wings bench.

After the smoke cleared, Forsberg and Larionov each received matching minor penalties for roughing; Roy and Vernon were each assessed matching minor penalties for leaving the crease, in addition to major penalties for fighting. McCarty escaped being assessed a major penalty and only received a double-minor for roughing, which gave Colorado a power play. Vernon was so convinced that he was ejected that he went to his locker stall only to have a team official race in to tell Vernon to put his gear back on and get back in net. Forsberg did not return due to an injury he sustained during the scrum, and the McCarty/Lemieux incident left patches of blood on the ice. There was even more blood when Roy sustained a cut on his eyebrow.

Fifteen seconds after the Roy/Vernon fight, Avalanche winger Adam Deadmarsh and Red Wings defenceman Vladimir Konstantinov dropped the gloves in another fight for the final fight in the first period.

There were more fights (and four stoppages) in the second period: a fight between Shanahan and Foote four seconds into the second period, simultaneous fights between Avalanche winger Mike Keane and Red Wings winger Tomas Holmström, which occurred for the most part on the ice, and between Severyn and Red Wings defenceman Aaron Ward at 3:34 in (Severyn and Ward were ejected for a secondary fight), McCarty and Deadmarsh at 7:24 (McCarty also received a roughing), and between Pushor and Avalanche defenceman Uwe Krupp at 11:26.

When the third period ended, the score was tied 5–5. Incidentally, it was McCarty who scored the winner against Roy 39 seconds into overtime, assisted by Shanahan and Larionov.

== Aftermath ==
Mike Vernon, who won his 300th career game, believed the brawl-filled game "brought the Red Wings together" in time for the playoffs. Red Wings broadcaster Ken Kal surmised that the game was a turning point as far as the team's success went. Avalanche head coach Marc Crawford, meanwhile, wondered why McCarty did not receive a game misconduct for his largely one-sided instigation and subsequent fight with Lemieux, while Avalanche general manager Pierre Lacroix immediately protested the game to NHL officials. Avalanche right winger Mike Keane criticized the Red Wings for not settling the issue when both teams played in Denver.

A similar free-for-all between the teams took place on May 22, during Game 4 of the Western Conference Finals at Joe Louis Arena, when during a penalty-filled game, Marc Crawford was seen screaming obscenities at Scotty Bowman across the glass separating the two benches. Bowman then told Crawford, "I knew your father before you did, and I don't think he'd be very proud of how you're acting." The Wings won that game 6–0 and went on to win the series in six games, en route to capturing the Stanley Cup. Crawford was fined $10,000 for the tirade.

The next season during a game between the two teams on November 11, 1997, McCarty and Lemieux began to throw punches seconds after the opening faceoff, much to the delight of the Joe Louis Arena crowd.

On April 1, 1998, Joe Louis Arena was the site of another brawl. This time Patrick Roy challenged and then squared off with Red Wings goaltender Chris Osgood at center ice. The referees called more severe penalties this time, as Roy and Osgood both received game misconducts. The two teams had a combined 218 penalty minutes. The Red Wings won the game 2–0, and would go on to win its second consecutive Stanley Cup.

A game between the Red Wings and Avalanche at the Pepsi Center on March 23, 2002, broke into a much smaller scrum when Red Wings winger Kirk Maltby crashed into Patrick Roy. Roy took exception and began retaliating. The scrum continued when Red Wings goaltender Dominik Hašek skated down the length of the ice to confront Roy but he slipped, which caused him to trip Roy. Infuriated, Roy threw off his glove and mask, but the two were restrained by the officials, thus preventing Roy from fighting a third Red Wings goaltender. The Red Wings won this game 2–0, and eventually the Stanley Cup.

On March 26, 2022, 25 years after the brawl, McCarty and Lemieux met again at a local bar in Michigan to rewatch this game.

ESPN released an E:60 documentary, Unrivaled, about the rivalry, specifically about this game, on June 26, 2022.

== Game summary ==
March 26, 1997	Colorado Avalanche	5–6	OT	Detroit Red Wings	Joe Louis Arena	Recap

Scoring summary
Period	Team	Goal	Assist(s)	Time	Score
1st	COL	Valeri Kamensky (24)	Peter Forsberg (54)	03:29	1–0 COL
2nd	DET	Sergei Fedorov (29)	Larry Murphy (33) and Steve Yzerman (60)	00:35	1–1
2nd	COL	Valeri Kamensky (25) – pp	Keith Jones (22) and Sandis Ozoliņš (40)	01:12	2–1 COL
2nd	DET	Martin Lapointe (13)	Vyacheslav Kozlov (21)	03:08	2–2
2nd	COL	René Corbet (10)	Stephane Yelle (15)	06:20	3–2 COL
2nd	COL	Adam Deadmarsh (32)	Sylvain Lefebvre (11) and Eric Lacroix (17)	13:34	4–2 COL
2nd	DET	Nicklas Lidström (15) – pp	Steve Yzerman (61)	19:40	4–3 COL
3rd	COL	Valeri Kamensky (26)	Stephane Yelle (16) and Claude Lemieux (16)	01:11	5–3 COL
3rd	DET	Martin Lapointe (14)	Sergei Fedorov (29) and Larry Murphy (34)	08:27	5–4 COL
3rd	DET	Brendan Shanahan (46)	Igor Larionov (40) and Jamie Pushor (7)	09:03	5–5
OT	DET	Darren McCarty (19)	Brendan Shanahan (39) and Igor Larionov (41)	00:39	6–5 DET
Penalty summary
Period	Team	Player	Penalty	Time	PIM
1st	COL	Scott Young	Interference	01:20	2:00
1st	COL	Brent Severyn	Fighting – major	04:45	5:00
1st	DET	Jamie Pushor	Fighting – major	04:45	5:00
1st	COL	Joe Sakic	Interference	05:12	2:00
1st	COL	René Corbet	Fighting – major	10:14	5:00
1st	DET	Kris Draper	Fighting – major	10:14	5:00
1st	DET	Kirk Maltby	Fighting – major	10:14	5:00
1st	COL	Patrick Roy	Leaving the crease	18:22	2:00
1st	COL	Patrick Roy	Fighting – major	18:22	5:00
1st	COL	Peter Forsberg	Roughing	18:22	2:00
1st	DET	Igor Larionov	Roughing	18:22	2:00
1st	DET	Mike Vernon	Leaving the crease	18:22	2:00
1st	DET	Mike Vernon	Fighting – major	18:22	5:00
1st	DET	Darren McCarty	Roughing – double minor	18:22	4:00
1st	COL	Adam Deadmarsh	Cross-checking	18:37	2:00
1st	COL	Adam Deadmarsh	Fighting – major	18:37	5:00
1st	DET	Vladimir Konstantinov	Fighting – major	18:37	5:00
2nd	COL	Adam Foote	Fighting – major	00:04	5:00
2nd	DET	Brendan Shanahan	Fighting – major	00:04	5:00
2nd	DET	Martin Lapointe	Roughing	00:56	2:00
2nd	COL	Mike Keane	Fighting – major	03:34	5:00
2nd	COL	Brent Severyn	Fighting – major	03:34	5:00
2nd	COL	Brent Severyn	Game misconduct	03:34	10:00
2nd	DET	Aaron Ward	Fighting – major	03:34	5:00
2nd	DET	Aaron Ward	Game misconduct	03:34	10:00
2nd	DET	Tomas Holmström	Fighting – major	03:34	5:00
2nd	COL	Adam Deadmarsh	Fighting – major	07:24	5:00
2nd	DET	Darren McCarty	Roughing	07:24	2:00
2nd	DET	Darren McCarty	Fighting – major	07:24	5:00
2nd	COL	Uwe Krupp	Fighting – major	11:26	5:00
2nd	DET	Jamie Pushor	Fighting – major	11:26	5:00
2nd	COL	Adam Deadmarsh	Interference	14:47	2:00
2nd	COL	Scott Young	Hooking	18:38	2:00
3rd	COL	Sandis Ozoliņš	Cross-checking	06:26	2:00
3rd	COL	Sandis Ozoliņš	Roughing	06:26	2:00
3rd	DET	Kirk Maltby	Roughing	06:26	2:00
3rd	COL	Jamie Pushor	Holding	14:40	2:00
3rd	COL	Sandis Ozoliņš	Tripping	16:07	2:00
OT	None				

Shots by period
Team	1	2	3	OT	Total
Detroit	8	23	15	1	47
Colorado	6	7	6	0	19

Power play opportunities
Team	Goals/Opportunities
Colorado	1/6
Detroit	1/6
