= Claude Lemieux =

Canadian ice hockey player (1965–2026)

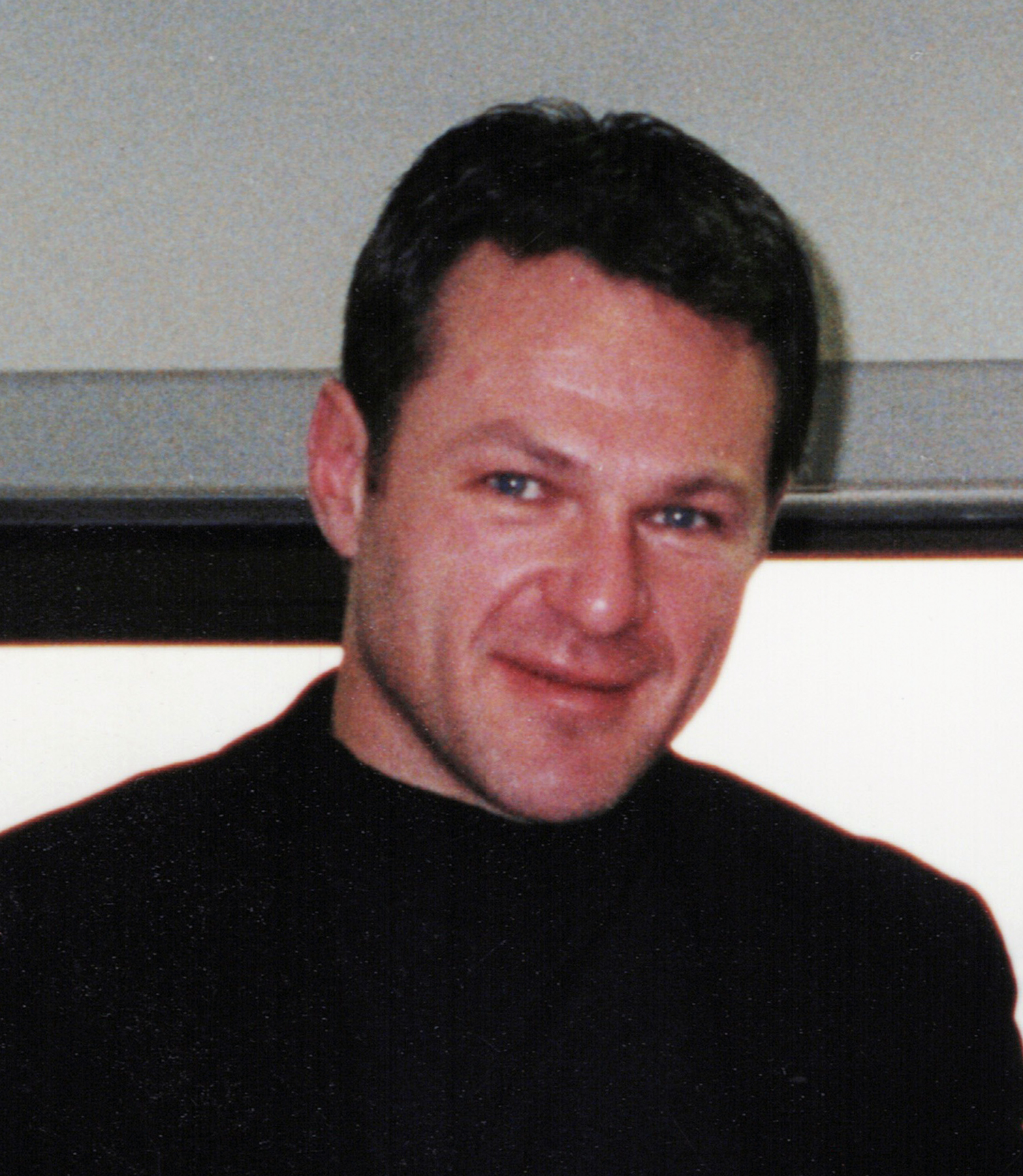
- Lemieux c. 1999–2000
- Born: July 16, 1965 Buckingham, Quebec, Canada
- Died: May 28, 2026 (aged 60) Lake Park, Florida, U.S.
- Height: 6 ft 1 in (185 cm)
- Weight: 215 lb (98 kg; 15 st 5 lb)
- Position: Right wing
- Shot: Right
- Played for: Montreal Canadiens; New Jersey Devils; Colorado Avalanche; Phoenix Coyotes; Dallas Stars; EV Zug; China Sharks; San Jose Sharks
- National team: Canada
- NHL draft: 26th overall, 1983; Montreal Canadiens
- Playing career: 1983–2004; 2008–2009

Claude Percy Lemieux (July 16, 1965 – May 28, 2026) was a Canadian professional ice hockey player. He played as a right winger for 21 seasons in the National Hockey League (NHL) with six teams between 1983 and 2009. Lemieux won four Stanley Cup championships during his career, including two with the New Jersey Devils, with whom he won the Conn Smythe Trophy during the team's victory in the 1995 Stanley Cup Final. He was one of 11 players to win a Stanley Cup championship with at least three different teams. One of the greatest playoff performers, he scored 80 playoff goals, ranking as the ninth most in NHL history. He was also known throughout his career as an aggressor, agitator, and enforcer.

Lemieux was born in Buckingham, Quebec, and grew up in Mont-Laurier. He was drafted in the second round of the 1983 NHL entry draft by the Montreal Canadiens and played with them from 1983 to 1990, winning his first Stanley Cup with the team in 1986. In 1990, he was traded to the Devils, with whom he played five seasons and won a second Stanley Cup. He was traded to the Colorado Avalanche in 1995 and won his third Stanley Cup during the 1996 Cup Final. During the playoffs that season, Lemieux hit Kris Draper of the Detroit Red Wings from behind, breaking Draper's orbital, cheek, and jaw bones, and sparking a vicious rivalry between the Avalanche and Red Wings. In 1999, Lemieux was traded back to the Devils and won a fourth Stanley Cup with them in the 2000 Cup Final. Over the next few seasons, he played for the Phoenix Coyotes and Dallas Stars. Lemieux left the NHL in 2003 and briefly joined EV Zug of the Swiss Nationalliga A before retiring as a player. In 2005, he was named president of the ECHL's Phoenix Roadrunners, a position he held for two years. Lemieux returned to the NHL with the San Jose Sharks for the 2008–09 season, but retired again after that year. Following his retirement, Lemieux became a sports agent, serving in the role until his death.

His son, Brendan Lemieux, is also a former NHL player, who plays for HC Davos of the National League in Switzerland.

== Playing career ==
=== NHL ===
Lemieux was drafted in the second round of the 1983 NHL entry draft by the Montreal Canadiens. The 6-foot-1-inch (185 cm), 215-pound (98 kg) right winger scored 379 goals and made 407 assists for a career point total of 786. He played with the Canadiens from 1983 to 1990. He played nine games in his first two seasons before making it for good with the Canadiens with the 1985–86 season. He scored one goal in ten games for the regular season before coming alive in the playoffs. In 20 games, he had a team-leading ten goals, with four being game-winners that saw him score the series-clinching goal in the Division Finals and in Game 3 of the Conference Finals. Ultimately, Montreal won the Stanley Cup Final for Lemieux's first championship. In the following season, he had 27 goals, and the next two seasons saw him record 31 and 29 goals each to become the sixth Canadiens player to start their career with three straight 20-goal seasons.

In September 1990, the Canadiens traded Lemieux to the New Jersey Devils in exchange for Sylvain Turgeon. He recorded 30 goals in his first season with the team along with 105 penalty minutes. He peaked in goals for a season in the 1991–92 season with 41 and had his peak in points with 81 (on 30 goals and 51 assists) the following year. In the strike-shortened 1994–95 season, he played in 45 of 48 total games and had six goals with 13 assists. In the Stanley Cup playoffs, he scored 13 goals (which led all skaters) in the postseason, with three of them being game-winning goals; his thirteen even-strength goals was tied for third most for a player in a single postseason and his six goals in the Conference Semifinals set a franchise record for most goals in a series that still stands. New Jersey defeated the heavily favoured Detroit Red Wings to win their first Cup and Lemieux's second as a player. Lemieux won the Conn Smythe Trophy that year as the playoff MVP. He remarked on the honor shortly after being awarded the Conn Smythe Trophy:

I think it's just unbelievable. I look at some of the names on this trophy and on the Stanley Cup, it's incredible. To be a part of the team that won the first Stanley Cup for the New Jersey Devils, who would have thought it? I played well. It's very special. The Stanley Cup is what we play for. To be the most hated man in hockey and have your name on the Conn Smythe Trophy, it's special.

Shortly before the beginning of the 1995–96 season, Lemieux was traded to the Colorado Avalanche in a three-team deal that also involved Wendel Clark and Steve Thomas. He scored 39 goals that season to go along with 32 assists. When the Avalanche won the Stanley Cup in 1996, Lemieux became the 10th player to win the Stanley Cup in back-to-back years with different teams.

In November 1999, Lemieux was traded back to New Jersey in a deal that sent Brian Rolston to Colorado. As a result of the trade, he played in 83 total games that year, recording 20 goals and 27 assists. He won his fourth and final Stanley Cup title with the Devils in 2000. In that off-season, Lemieux signed as a free agent with the Phoenix Coyotes. In January 2001, he signed an extension with the Coyotes.

In January 2003, the Coyotes traded him to the Dallas Stars for Scott Pellerin and a conditional draft pick. Lemieux initially played his final NHL season with Dallas in the 2002–03 season, although he never formally announced his retirement. He played briefly the following season for EV Zug of the Swiss Nationalliga A.

=== Retirement ===
In 2005, Lemieux became president of the ECHL incarnation of the Phoenix RoadRunners.

In 2007, Lemieux took part in the second season of the Spike TV television show Pros vs. Joes. In October 2009, Lemieux began competing as a pairs figure skater on the CBC Television reality show Battle of the Blades with Shae-Lynn Bourne. For one of their routines, the pair skated to Lemieux's recorded version of Leonard Cohen's Hallelujah, which he sang as a duet with Kathryn Rose.

=== 2008 comeback ===
In September 2008, on RDS, Lemieux expressed an interest in making a comeback to the NHL. He began the season with the China Sharks of the Asia League Ice Hockey before signing a contract with the Worcester Sharks on November 25. After scoring two goals and six points in 14 games with Worcester, Lemieux signed a two-way contract with the San Jose Sharks on December 29, 2008. The following day, he cleared waivers and continued to play for Worcester. On January 19, 2009, the San Jose Sharks recalled Lemieux to the NHL; on February 19, he recorded the first (and only) NHL point of his comeback, assisting on Milan Michálek's second-period goal against the Los Angeles Kings. That same year, the Sharks won the Presidents' Trophy. Lemieux retired for the second time after the 2008–09 season.

== International play ==
Medal record

Men's ice hockey

Representing Canada

World Cup
Silver medal – second place	1996 Canada	

Canada Cup
Gold medal – first place	1987 Canada	

World Junior Championships
Gold medal – first place	1985 Canada	

Lemieux represented Canada three times in international competitions. He made his first international appearance as a member of the Canadian junior team at the 1985 World Junior Championships in Helsinki, Finland. Lemieux finished the tournament with three goals and two assists in six games to help Canada win its second World Juniors gold medal. Lemieux was also a member of the 1987 Canada Cup-winning team, tallying two points in six games. His final appearance in international play came when he was selected to Canada's roster for the 1996 World Cup of Hockey. Lemieux picked up 19 penalty minutes in the eight games as Canada finished second.

== Playing style ==
Throughout his career, Lemieux was noted for playing his best games during the postseason. Once Lemieux was called up to the NHL for good during the 1985–86 season, he played in 15 consecutive postseasons. In his career, starting with the 1986 playoffs, he played in the postseason 18 different years, missing only the 2001 playoffs while with the Phoenix Coyotes. Lemieux played in 234 playoff games, which is fifth all-time in the NHL. On three occasions, he scored more goals during the playoffs than during the regular season (1985–86 with Montreal, 1994–95 with New Jersey, and 1996–97 with Colorado). Lemieux retired with 80 career playoff goals, ninth all-time in the NHL.

Lemieux was also notorious for being among the league's most hated and dirtiest players; as late as 2018, Bleacher Report labelled him as the third most hated player of all-time behind Sean Avery and Matt Cooke. While playing for Montreal in the 1986 Stanley Cup Final against the Calgary Flames, Lemieux bit Calgary's Jim Peplinski on the finger during a scuffle, prompting the Calgary winger to say, "I didn't know they allowed cannibalism in the NHL."

=== Hit on Kris Draper ===
Lemieux's reputation for playing dirty was solidified in a 1996 incident with the Avalanche when Lemieux checked Kris Draper of the Detroit Red Wings into the boards from behind during Game 6 of the Western Conference Finals. Draper suffered a concussion, broken jaw, broken nose, and broken cheekbone, all of which led to Draper having reconstructive surgery on his face and his jaw wired shut for several weeks. This incident sparked a bitter rivalry between the two teams. The NHL suspended him for two games, which caused an outcry from some fans who felt he deserved a harsher penalty. Red Wings player Dino Ciccarelli said after the series, "I can't believe I shook this guy's friggin' hand after the game. That pisses me right off."

Tensions between the two teams reached a breaking point the next season. The March 26, 1997 game, referred to as "Fight Night at the Joe", saw Detroit's forward Darren McCarty engage Lemieux shortly after a fight started by Peter Forsberg with Igor Larionov had stopped play. McCarty threw one punch to Lemieux, who fell down on the ice and was badly beaten before the officials could remove McCarty from him. Several fights erupted around the two, as both teams, including the goalies, fought. In the next regular-season game between the teams in Detroit the following year, McCarty and Lemieux fought each other again; in later years, the two would work together for public events, which raised money for charity.

== Post-retirement ==
After retiring from the NHL, Lemieux was often a guest on The Sports Network's Off the Record with Michael Landsberg, sharing insights on his playing days in the NHL. At the time of his death, he was President of the sports agency 4sports Hockey, representing 16 clients, including Timo Meier, Moritz Seider, Rickard Rakell, Hampus Lindholm, and Frederik Andersen.

== Personal life and death ==
Lemieux was born in Buckingham, Quebec, on July 16, 1965. After he retired, he resided in Huntington Beach, California. He became a United States citizen through naturalization on June 26, 2009.

He was the older brother of former NHL forward Jocelyn Lemieux.

Lemieux had four children between two marriages – three sons and a daughter. His son Brendan was a left winger in the NHL, playing for five NHL teams over seven seasons. They are the only father–son duo to both be punished by the NHL for biting other players.

Lemieux died by suicide on May 28, 2026, at the age of 60. He was found by one of his sons on the property of a furniture store Lemieux owned in Lake Park, Florida. His final public appearance was at game 3 of the Eastern Conference finals on May 25, 2026, where he was a torch-bearer for the Montreal Canadiens. Lemieux's family announced his brain would be donated to the Boston University CTE Center and Brain Bank for research on the impact of repeated head injuries.

== Career statistics ==
=== Regular season and playoffs ===
			Regular season					Playoffs
Season	Team	League	GP	G	A	Pts	PIM	GP	G	A	Pts	PIM
1981–82	Richelieu Éclaireurs	QMAAA	48	24	48	72	96	8	10	13	23	14
1982–83	Trois-Rivières Draveurs	QMJHL	62	28	38	66	187	4	1	0	1	30
1983–84	Montreal Canadiens	NHL	8	1	1	2	12	—	—	—	—	—
1983–84	Verdun Juniors	QMJHL	51	41	45	86	225	9	8	12	20	63
1983–84	Nova Scotia Voyageurs	AHL	—	—	—	—	—	2	1	0	1	6
1983–84	Verdun Juniors	MC	—	—	—	—	—	3	1	3	4	2
1984–85	Montreal Canadiens	NHL	1	0	1	1	7	—	—	—	—	—
1984–85	Verdun Junior Canadiens	QMJHL	52	58	66	124	152	14	23	17	40	38
1985–86	Sherbrooke Canadiens	AHL	58	21	32	53	145	—	—	—	—	—
1985–86	Montreal Canadiens	NHL	10	1	2	3	22	20	10	6	16	68
1986–87	Montreal Canadiens	NHL	76	27	26	53	156	17	4	9	13	41
1987–88	Montreal Canadiens	NHL	78	31	30	61	137	11	3	2	5	20
1988–89	Montreal Canadiens	NHL	69	29	22	51	136	18	4	3	7	58
1989–90	Montreal Canadiens	NHL	39	8	10	18	106	11	1	3	4	38
1990–91	New Jersey Devils	NHL	78	30	17	47	105	7	4	0	4	34
1991–92	New Jersey Devils	NHL	74	41	27	68	109	7	4	3	7	26
1992–93	New Jersey Devils	NHL	77	30	51	81	155	5	2	0	2	19
1993–94	New Jersey Devils	NHL	79	18	26	44	86	20	7	11	18	44
1994–95	New Jersey Devils	NHL	45	6	13	19	86	20	13	3	16	20
1995–96	Colorado Avalanche	NHL	79	39	32	71	117	19	5	7	12	55
1996–97	Colorado Avalanche	NHL	45	11	17	28	43	17	13	10	23	32
1997–98	Colorado Avalanche	NHL	78	26	27	53	115	7	3	3	6	8
1998–99	Colorado Avalanche	NHL	82	27	24	51	102	19	3	11	14	26
1999–2000	Colorado Avalanche	NHL	13	3	6	9	4	—	—	—	—	—
1999–2000	New Jersey Devils	NHL	70	17	21	38	86	23	4	6	10	28
2000–01	Phoenix Coyotes	NHL	46	10	16	26	58	—	—	—	—	—
2001–02	Phoenix Coyotes	NHL	82	16	25	41	70	5	0	0	0	2
2002–03	Phoenix Coyotes	NHL	36	6	8	14	30	—	—	—	—	—
2002–03	Dallas Stars	NHL	32	2	4	6	14	7	0	1	1	10
2003–04	EV Zug	NLA	7	2	3	5	4	5	1	3	4	8
2008–09	China Sharks	ALH	2	0	1	1	4	—	—	—	—	—
2008–09	Worcester Sharks	AHL	23	3	8	11	24	—	—	—	—	—
2008–09	San Jose Sharks	NHL	18	0	1	1	21	1	0	0	0	0
NHL totals			1,215	379	407	786	1,777	234	80	78	158	529

=== International ===
Year	Team	Event	GP	G	A	Pts	PIM
1985	Canada	WJC	6	3	2	5	6
1987	Canada	CC	6	1	1	2	4
1996	Canada	WCH	8	1	1	2	19
Junior totals			6	3	2	5	6
Senior totals			14	2	2	4	23

== Awards and achievements ==
- QMJHL Second All-Star Team – 1984
- QMJHL Playoff MVP – 1985
- QMJHL First All-Star Team – 1985
- Guy Lafleur Trophy – 1985
- Conn Smythe Trophy winner – 1995
- 4x Stanley Cup champion – 1986, 1995, 1996, 2000
- Inducted into Quebec Major Junior Hockey League Hall of Fame – 2005
- 9th all-time in Stanley Cup playoff goals (80)

== See also ==
- Notable families in the NHL

Awards and achievements
Preceded by Brian Leetch	Winner of the Conn Smythe Trophy; 1995	Succeeded by Joe Sakic
