= Jocelyn Thibault =

Canadian ice hockey player (born 1975)

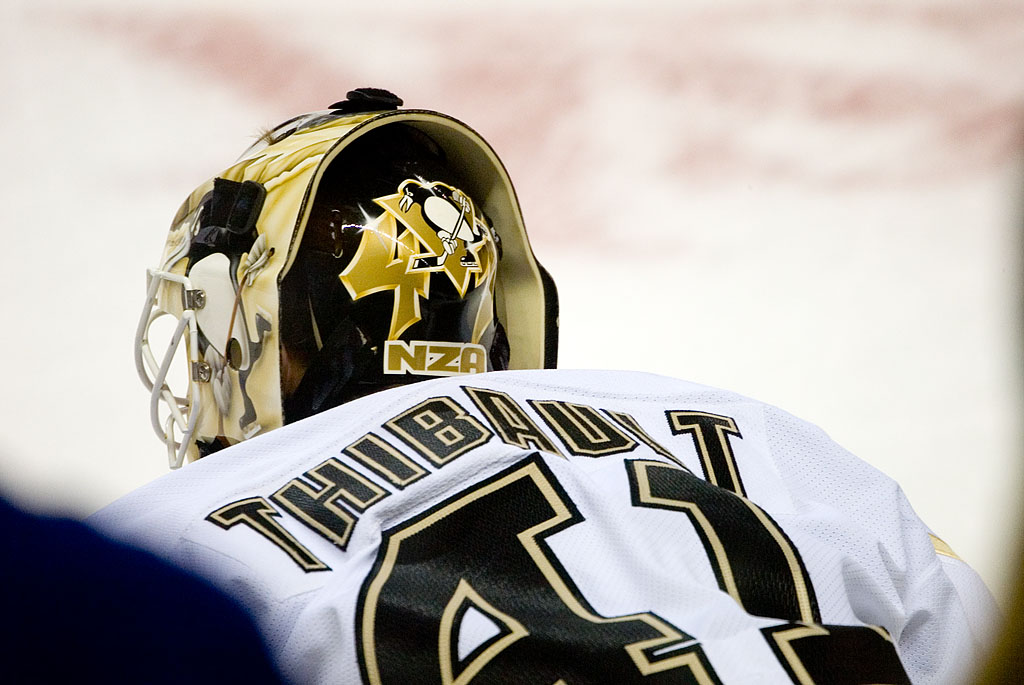
- Thibault with the Pittsburgh Penguins in November 2006
- Born: January 12, 1975 (age 51) Montreal, Quebec, Canada
- Height: 5 ft 11 in (180 cm)
- Weight: 170 lb (77 kg; 12 st 2 lb)
- Position: Goaltender
- Caught: Left
- Played for: Quebec Nordiques; Colorado Avalanche; Montreal Canadiens; Chicago Blackhawks; Pittsburgh Penguins; Buffalo Sabres
- NHL draft: 10th overall, 1993; Quebec Nordiques
- Playing career: 1993–2008

Joseph Régis Jocelyn Thibault (born January 12, 1975) is a Canadian former professional ice hockey goaltender who played 14 seasons in the National Hockey League (NHL) for the Quebec Nordiques, Colorado Avalanche, Montreal Canadiens, Chicago Blackhawks, Pittsburgh Penguins, and Buffalo Sabres. Thibault was born in Montreal, Quebec, and grew up in nearby Laval.

He led a group out of Sherbrooke, Quebec to create an expansion team in the QMJHL. The new team, Sherbrooke Phoenix, started playing in the 2012–13 season. In 2021, Thibault left the Phoenix to become the new executive director of Hockey Quebec.

== Playing career ==
As a youth, Thibault played in the 1988 Quebec International Pee-Wee Hockey Tournament with a minor ice hockey team from Laval, Quebec. He played in the Quebec Major Junior Hockey League as part of the Trois-Rivières Draveurs and Sherbrooke Faucons.

Thibault was drafted by the Quebec Nordiques 10th overall in the 1993 NHL entry draft. He went on to play for the Nordiques, staying for a short time after they moved to Denver and became the Colorado Avalanche. In 1995, midway through the Avalanche's first season in Denver, he was sent to the Montreal Canadiens in a trade that moved Patrick Roy to the Avalanche. Thibault played three seasons with the Canadiens before being traded to the Chicago Blackhawks in November 1998.

Thibault played longer with the Blackhawks than with any other team—five seasons. His best season was the 2002–03 season when he recorded eight shutouts and made an appearance in the 2003 NHL All-Star Game. He recorded his career best GAA of 2.37 and a save percentage of .915. The following season had him suffer a torn labrum in November, requiring surgery and having Michael Leighton replace him.

After the lockout, Thibault was acquired by the Pittsburgh Penguins in August 2005, for a fourth round pick in the 2006 NHL entry draft on a two-year contract worth $3 million. However, a hip injury contributed to a bad beginning, with the veteran losing 12 of 13 starts. He was replaced as the starter by Marc-André Fleury in late November and put on waivers. In January 2006, he underwent surgery to repair torn cartilage in his left hip.

Thibault was signed as an unrestricted free agent on July 5, 2007, by the Buffalo Sabres. He played one season with Buffalo as the backup to Ryan Miller and was not re-signed.

Thibault has the distinction of being the winning goaltender of the last game at the Montreal Forum, Maple Leaf Gardens, and the Capital Centre. He also played in the last game at Colisee de Quebec.

== Personal life ==
Thibault and his wife Melanie have three daughters. The family resides in Sherbrooke, Quebec.

Thibault is the godfather of Samuel Poulin, who was drafted 21st overall by the Pittsburgh Penguins in the 2019 NHL entry draft.

== Career statistics ==
=== Regular season and playoffs ===
			Regular season										Playoffs
Season	Team	League	GP	W	L	T	OTL	MIN	GA	SO	GAA	SV%	GP	W	L	MIN	GA	SO	GAA	SV%
1990–91	Laval Régents	QMAAA	20	14	5	0	—	1178	78	1	3.94		5	1	4	300	20	0	4.00
1991–92	Trois-Rivières Draveurs	QMJHL	30	14	7	1	—	1496	77	0	3.94	.898	3	1	1	110	4	0	2.19	.911
1992–93	Sherbrooke Faucons	QMJHL	56	34	14	5	—	1497	159	3	2.99	.899	15	9	6	882	57	0	3.87	.862
1993–94	Cornwall Aces	AHL	4	4	0	0	—	240	9	1	2.25	.930	—	—	—	—	—	—	—	—
1993–94	Quebec Nordiques	NHL	29	8	13	3	—	1504	83	0	3.31	.892	—	—	—	—	—	—	—	—
1994–95	Sherbrooke Faucons	QMJHL	13	6	6	1	—	776	38	1	2.94	.903	—	—	—	—	—	—	—	—
1994–95	Quebec Nordiques	NHL	18	12	2	2	—	898	35	1	2.34	.917	3	1	2	148	8	0	3.24	.895
1995–96	Colorado Avalanche	NHL	10	3	4	2	—	558	28	0	3.01	.874	—	—	—	—	—	—	—	—
1995–96	Montreal Canadiens	NHL	40	23	13	3	—	2334	110	3	2.83	.913	6	2	4	310	18	0	3.47	.904
1996–97	Montreal Canadiens	NHL	61	22	24	11	—	3397	164	1	2.90	.910	3	0	3	179	13	0	4.36	.871
1997–98	Montreal Canadiens	NHL	47	19	15	8	—	2652	109	2	2.47	.902	2	0	0	43	4	0	5.53	.750
1998–99	Montreal Canadiens	NHL	10	3	4	2	—	529	23	1	2.61	.908	—	—	—	—	—	—	—	—
1998–99	Chicago Blackhawks	NHL	52	21	26	5	—	3015	136	4	2.69	.905	—	—	—	—	—	—	—	—
1999–00	Chicago Blackhawks	NHL	60	25	26	7	—	3438	158	3	2.76	.906	—	—	—	—	—	—	—	—
2000–01	Chicago Blackhawks	NHL	66	27	32	7	—	3844	180	6	2.81	.895	—	—	—	—	—	—	—	—
2001–02	Chicago Blackhawks	NHL	67	33	23	9	—	3838	159	6	2.49	.902	3	1	2	158	7	0	2.65	.909
2002–03	Chicago Blackhawks	NHL	62	26	28	7	—	3650	144	8	2.37	.915	—	—	—	—	—	—	—	—
2003–04	Chicago Blackhawks	NHL	14	5	7	2	—	821	39	1	2.85	.913	—	—	—	—	—	—	—	—
2005–06	Pittsburgh Penguins	NHL	16	1	9	—	3	807	60	0	4.46	.876	—	—	—	—	—	—	—	—
2006–07	Pittsburgh Penguins	NHL	22	7	8	—	2	1101	52	1	2.83	.909	1	0	0	8	0	0	0.00	1.000
2007–08	Buffalo Sabres	NHL	12	3	4	—	2	507	28	2	3.31	.869	—	—	—	—	—	—	—	—
NHL totals			586	238	238	68	7	32,893	1,508	39	2.75	.904	18	4	11	847	50	0	3.54	.891

== Transactions ==
- June 26, 1993 – Drafted by the Quebec Nordiques in the first round (10th overall) in 1993 draft.
- June 21, 1995 – Rights transferred to the Colorado Avalanche after the Nordiques franchise relocated.
- December 6, 1995 – Montreal Canadiens traded Patrick Roy and Mike Keane to the Avalanche for Andrei Kovalenko, Martin Ručinský, and Thibault.
- November 16, 1998 – Chicago Blackhawks traded Jeff Hackett, Eric Weinrich, Alain Nasreddine, and fourth-round selection (previously acquired from the Tampa Bay Lightning – Chris Dyment) in 1999 draft to the Canadiens for Thibault, Dave Manson, and Brad Brown.
- August 10, 2005 – Traded to the Pittsburgh Penguins for a fourth-round selection in 2006 draft.
- July 5, 2007 – Signed as an unrestricted free agent by the Buffalo Sabres.

Awards and achievements
Preceded by Todd Warriner	Quebec Nordiques first-round draft pick 1993	Succeeded by Adam Deadmarsh
