= Adam Deadmarsh =

Canadian-American ice hockey player (born 1975)

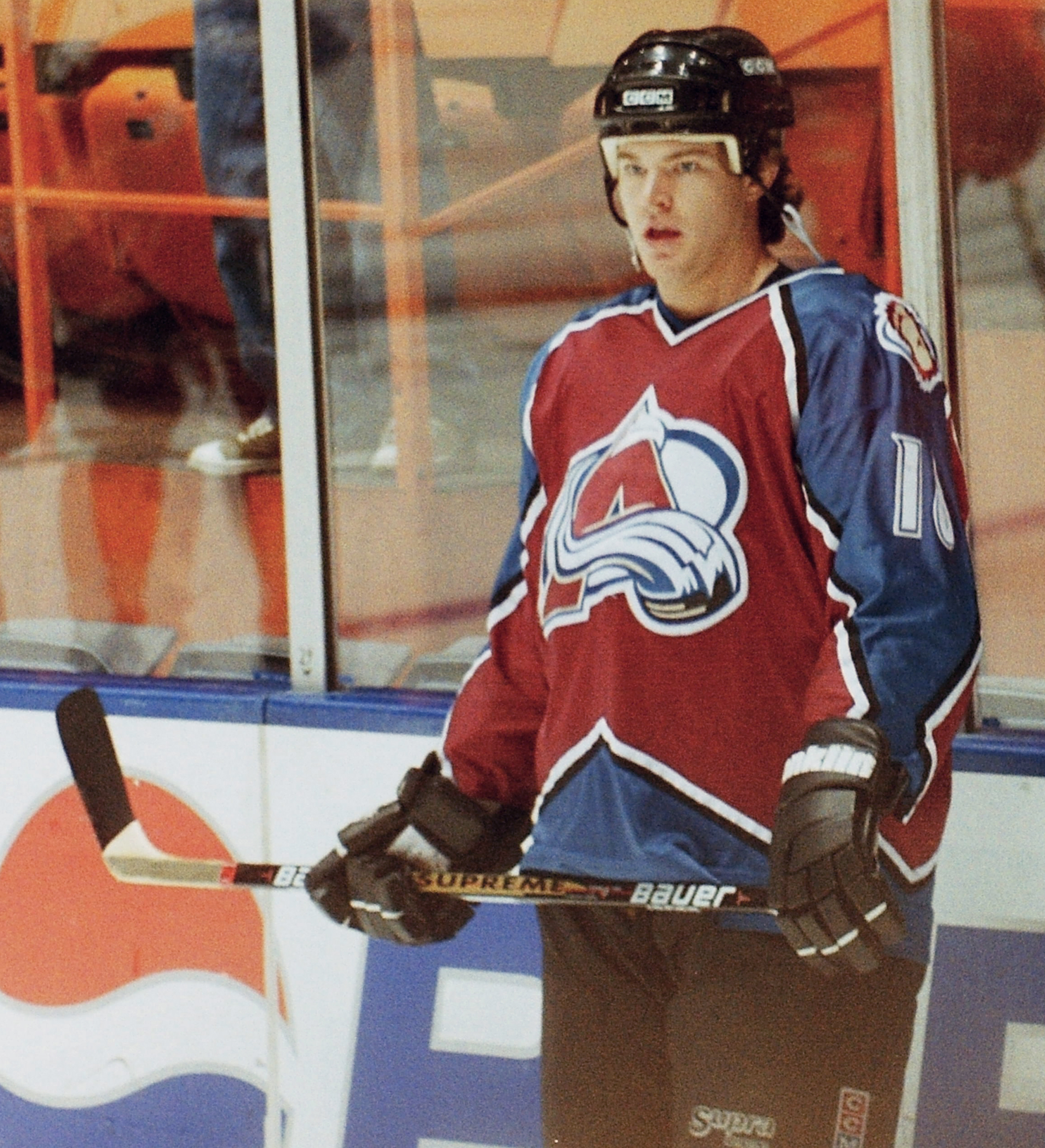
- Deadmarsh with the Colorado Avalanche in 1997
- Born: May 10, 1975 (age 51) Trail, British Columbia, Canada
- Height: 6 ft 0 in (183 cm)
- Weight: 205 lb (93 kg; 14 st 9 lb)
- Position: Right wing
- Shot: Right
- Played for: Quebec Nordiques; Colorado Avalanche; Los Angeles Kings
- Coached for: Colorado Avalanche (Assistant); Spokane Chiefs (Assistant)
- National team: United States
- NHL draft: 14th overall, 1993; Quebec Nordiques
- Playing career: 1994–2003
- Coaching career: 2009–2020

Adam Richard Deadmarsh (born May 10, 1975) is a Canadian-born American former professional ice hockey player who played in the NHL with the Quebec Nordiques, Colorado Avalanche, and Los Angeles Kings. Deadmarsh was later a video coordinator and assistant coach with the Avalanche, before concussion issues forced him to step down after the 2011–12 season, nine years after his playing career ended for the same reason.

Deadmarsh won the Stanley Cup in 1996 with the Colorado Avalanche — however his name was misspelled on the Cup as "Deadmarch". It was later corrected, marking the first correction on the Cup.

== Playing career ==
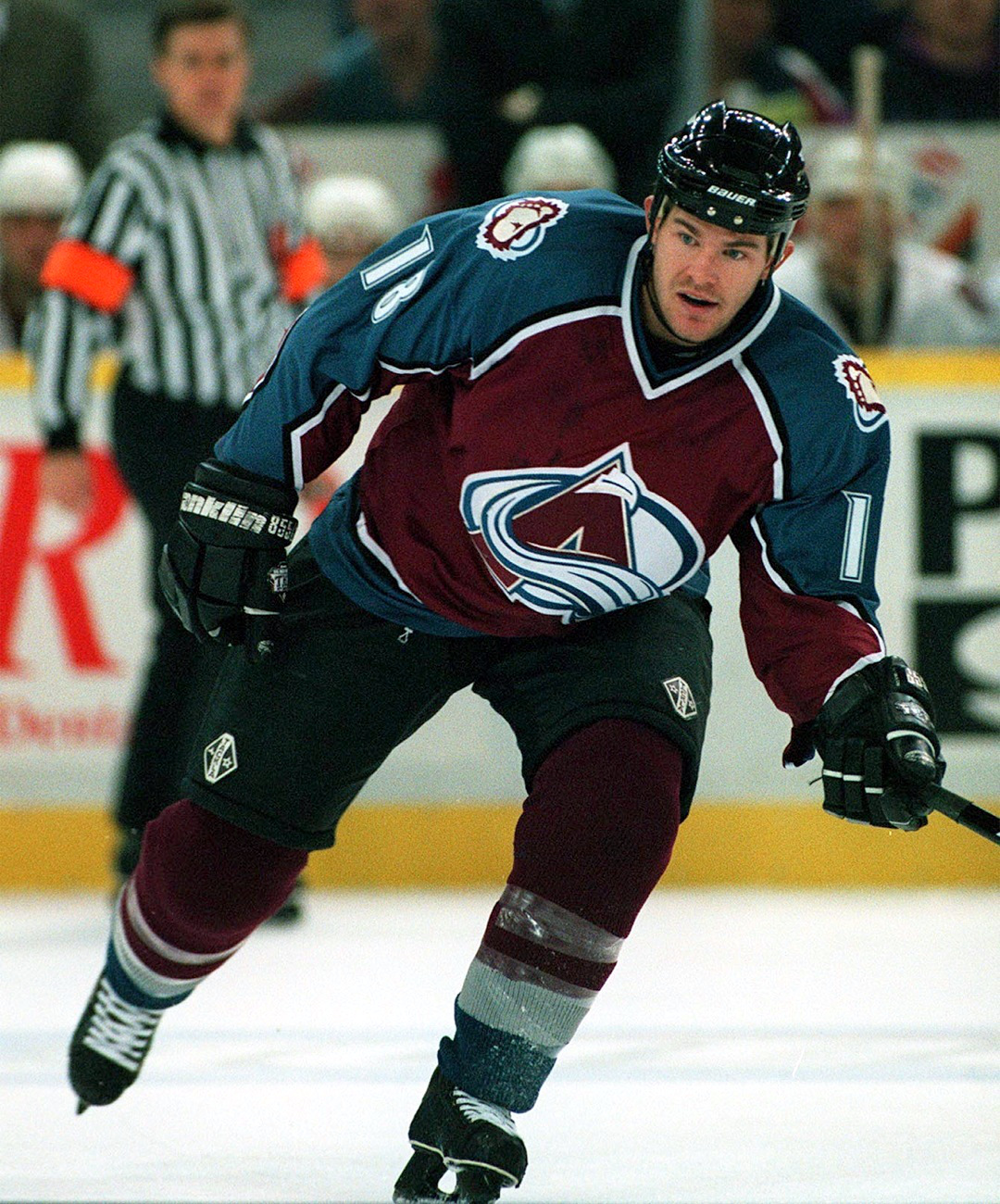
Deadmarsh with the Colorado Avalanche

Deadmarsh was drafted by the Quebec Nordiques in the 1993 NHL entry draft, first round, 14th overall, from the Portland Winterhawks of the Western Hockey League. After the lock-out shortened 1994-95 season, the Nordiques relocated to Denver and became the Colorado Avalanche. Deadmarsh helped the Avalanche upset the heavily-favored Detroit Red Wings in the Western Conference Finals, and then won the Stanley Cup over the Florida Panthers in 1996. His name was initially misspelled "Deadmarch" on the Cup, but was later corrected; it was the first time a misspelling on the Stanley Cup had ever been corrected.

Deadmarsh was traded to the Los Angeles Kings on February 21, 2001, along with Aaron Miller, a player to be named later (Jared Aulin), and Colorado's first round pick in the 2001 NHL entry draft (Dave Steckel) for Rob Blake and Steve Reinprecht. While the Avalanche were doing well at the time, they leapt at the chance to land Blake who was a star defenseman; the Kings were forced to deal Blake who was a pending unrestricted free agent and had declined to sign a contract extension. The Kings had not won a postseason series since 1993, but the addition of Deadmarsh and Miller with their considerable postseason experience made the Kings competitive in the playoffs. Deadmarsh became a playoff hero for vaulting the Kings past the heavily favored Detroit Red Wings in round one of the 2001 Stanley Cup Playoffs, after trailing late in Game 4 by three goals while his team was already down two games to one. Red Wings captain Steve Yzerman has attributed his team's playoff eliminations to Deadmarsh, who was among the Red Wings' most frequent opponents from 1996-2001 while a member of the Avalanche. Los Angeles went on to lose in the conference semifinals to Deadmarsh's former team, the Avalanche, in seven games; the Avalanche would eventually win their second Stanley Cup.

A U.S. citizen by virtue of having an American mother, Deadmarsh played for Team USA in the 1996 World Cup of Hockey, the 1998 Winter Olympics, and the 2002 Winter Olympics, winning a gold medal in 1996 and a silver medal in 2002.

After missing most of the 2002–03 NHL season and the entire 2003–04 NHL season due to two concussions (and the next season due to the NHL lockout), Deadmarsh (unofficially) announced his retirement on September 22, 2005, citing the previous concussion as an inability to play further. He was honored on March 20, 2006, before a game between the Avalanche and Kings at Staples Center in downtown Los Angeles, California, for his dedication to both teams.

He had previously played junior hockey for the Portland Winter Hawks in the Western Hockey League and was a 3 time member of the U.S. National Junior Team, where he shares the all-time U.S. record of 21 games played at the World Junior Ice Hockey Championships. He resides in Idaho with his wife and twin daughters.

Adam is a second cousin of former NHL player Butch Deadmarsh.

== International play ==
Medal record

Representing United States

Ice hockey

Winter Olympics
Silver medal – second place	2002 Salt Lake City	

World Cup
Gold medal – first place	1996 Canada	

Deadmarsh was born in Canada but had dual US-Canadian citizenship, and could represent either country in International play. A U.S. citizen by virtue of having an American mother, Deadmarsh chose to play for Team USA in the 1993 World Junior Ice Hockey Championships and the 1994 World Junior Ice Hockey Championships where he failed to register any points in both tournaments. He again represented the USA at the 1995 World Junior Ice Hockey Championships where he ranked seventh in the tournament scoring with six goals and four assists. In 1996, Deadmarsh won a gold medal at the innagural 1996 World Cup of Hockey tournament.

He was selected for both the 1998 Winter Olympics, and the 2002 Winter Olympics teams, winning a silver medal at home at Salt Lake City in 2002.

== Post-playing career ==
After seven years away from hockey, the Colorado Avalanche hired Adam Deadmarsh as their Video/Development Coach On June 19, 2009, where he served in that role from 2009 to 2011. After spending 2 seasons as Video/Development Coach with the Colorado Avalanche, Deadmarsh was promoted to be an Assistant Coach for the team on June 16, 2011. After only serving 1 season as an Assistant Coach with Colorado, Adam ultimately resigned from his position behind the bench due to concussion issues on June 7, 2012, and took on a new role with the organization working in their player development office.

On August 22, 2017, it was announced that the Spokane Chiefs (WHL) had hired Deadmarsh as an assistant coach with their club, where he served from 2017 to 2020.

== Career statistics ==
=== Regular season and playoffs ===
			Regular season					Playoffs
Season	Team	League	GP	G	A	Pts	PIM	GP	G	A	Pts	PIM
1990–91	Beaver Valley Nitehawks	KIJHL	35	28	44	72	95	—	—	—	—	—
1991–92	Portland Winter Hawks	WHL	68	30	30	60	111	6	3	3	6	13
1992–93	Portland Winter Hawks	WHL	58	33	36	69	126	16	7	8	15	29
1993–94	Portland Winter Hawks	WHL	65	43	56	99	212	10	9	8	17	33
1994–95	Portland Winter Hawks	WHL	29	28	20	48	129	—	—	—	—	—
1994–95	Quebec Nordiques	NHL	48	9	8	17	56	6	0	1	1	0
1995–96	Colorado Avalanche	NHL	78	21	27	48	142	22	5	12	17	25
1996–97	Colorado Avalanche	NHL	78	33	27	60	136	17	3	6	9	24
1997–98	Colorado Avalanche	NHL	73	22	21	43	125	7	2	0	2	4
1998–99	Colorado Avalanche	NHL	66	22	27	49	99	19	8	4	12	20
1999–2000	Colorado Avalanche	NHL	71	18	27	45	106	17	4	11	15	21
2000–01	Colorado Avalanche	NHL	39	13	13	26	59	—	—	—	—	—
2000–01	Los Angeles Kings	NHL	18	4	2	6	4	13	3	3	6	4
2001–02	Los Angeles Kings	NHL	76	29	33	62	71	4	1	3	4	2
2002–03	Los Angeles Kings	NHL	20	13	4	17	21	—	—	—	—	—
NHL totals			567	184	189	373	819	105	26	40	66	100

=== International ===
Medal record

Representing United States

Ice hockey

Winter Olympics
Silver medal – second place	2002 Salt Lake City	

World Cup
Gold medal – first place	1996 Canada	

Year	Team	Event	Result	GP	G	A	Pts	PIM
1993	United States	WJC	4th	7	0	0	0	10
1994	United States	WJC	6th	7	0	0	0	8
1995	United States	WJC	5th	7	6	4	10	10
1996	United States	WCH	1st place, gold medalist(s)	7	2	2	4	8
1998	United States	OG	6th	4	1	0	1	2
2002	United States	OG	2nd place, silver medalist(s)	6	1	1	2	2
Junior totals				21	6	4	10	28
Senior totals				17	4	3	7	12

== Awards and honors ==
Award	Year
NHL
Stanley Cup (Colorado Avalanche)	1996

Awards and achievements
Preceded by Jocelyn Thibault	Quebec Nordiques first-round draft pick 1993	Succeeded by Wade Belak
