= René Corbet =

Canadian ice hockey player (born 1973)

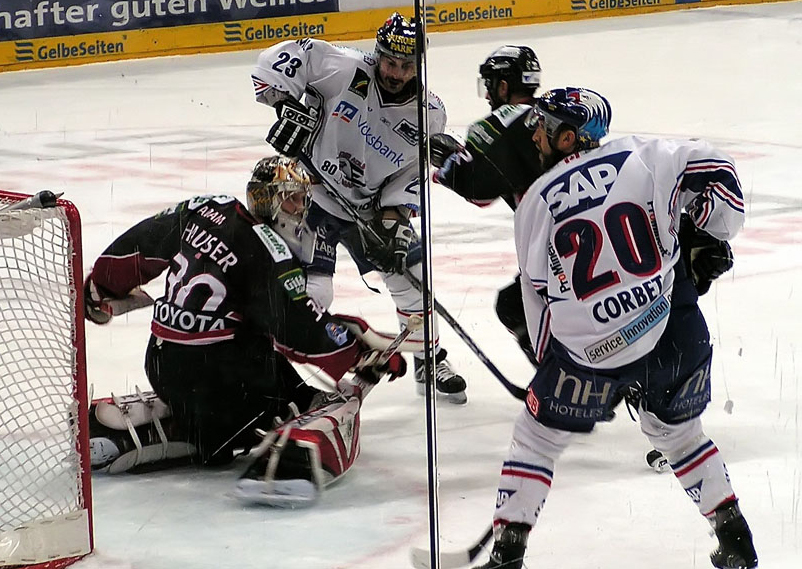
- Born: June 25, 1973 (age 53) Victoriaville, Quebec, Canada
- Height: 6 ft 0 in (183 cm)
- Weight: 198 lb (90 kg; 14 st 2 lb)
- Position: Left wing
- Shot: Left
- Played for: Quebec Nordiques; Colorado Avalanche; Calgary Flames; Pittsburgh Penguins; Adler Mannheim; Frisk Tigers
- NHL draft: 24th overall, 1991; Quebec Nordiques
- Playing career: 1993–2011

René Corbet (born June 25, 1973) is a Canadian former professional ice hockey player who played in the National Hockey League (NHL) with the Quebec Nordiques, Colorado Avalanche, Calgary Flames, and the Pittsburgh Penguins.

== Playing career ==
As a youth, Corbet played in the 1986 and 1987 Quebec International Pee-Wee Hockey Tournaments with the Longueuil Chevaliers Selects minor ice hockey team.

Corbet was drafted in the second round (24th overall) of the 1991 NHL entry draft by the Quebec Nordiques. Corbet was a prolific scorer in the Quebec Major Junior Hockey League (QMJHL) with the Drummondville Voltigeurs, winning the Jean Béliveau Trophy in his final season in 1992–93.

Corbet made his professional debut in the 1993–94 NHL season and played nine games with the Nordiques, scoring a goal and an assist. Corbet played primarily for the Nordiques' American Hockey League (AHL) affiliate, the Cornwall Aces, and won the Dudley "Red" Garrett Memorial Award but played a further eight games with Quebec in its final season.

Following the franchise's relocation to Denver, Corbet won the Stanley Cup with the Colorado Avalanche in its inaugural season in 1995-96. Corbet established himself the following season with the Presidents' Trophy-winning Avalanche in 1996-97 posting 27 points in 76 games. During his fourth season with the Avalanche in 1998–99 Corbet was traded, along with Wade Belak and Robyn Regehr, to the Calgary Flames for Theoren Fleury and Chris Dingman on February 28, 1999. Corbet recorded a career-high 31 points to finish the season with the Flames.

Unable to replicate the scoring pace from his junior career, Corbet settled into a checking line role and after only 48 games with the Flames in the 1999–2000 season, he was again traded, along with Tyler Moss to the Pittsburgh Penguins for Brad Werenka on March 14, 2000.

Corbet re-signed a one-year deal with the Penguins for the 2000–01 season. Corbet was besieged with injuries, missing half the year but returned to help the Pittsburgh to the Conference finals before moving to Germany in 2001 to join Adler Mannheim of the Deutsche Eishockey Liga (DEL). Corbet played with Mannheim for the next eight years, leaving the team as the franchise leader in goals (130) and captaining the team to the German Championship in 2007 and two cups.

On October 26, 2009, he signed with Norwegian team Frisk Tigers of the GET-ligaen for the 2009–10 season. He signed a one-year extension prior to the 2010-11 season and announced his retirement at the conclusion of the year.

== Career statistics ==
			Regular season					Playoffs
Season	Team	League	GP	G	A	Pts	PIM	GP	G	A	Pts	PIM
1988–89	Richelieu Riverains	QMAAA	3	0	1	1	2	—	—	—	—	—
1989–90	Richelieu Riverains	QMAAA	42	53	63	116	34	4	4	3	7	4
1990–91	Drummondville Voltigeurs	QMJHL	45	25	40	65	34	14	11	6	17	15
1990–91	Drummondville Voltigeurs	MC	—	—	—	—	—	4	1	2	3	0
1991–92	Drummondville Voltigeurs	QMJHL	56	46	50	96	90	4	1	2	3	17
1992–93	Drummondville Voltigeurs	QMJHL	63	79	69	148	143	10	7	13	20	16
1993–94	Cornwall Aces	AHL	68	37	40	77	56	13	7	2	9	18
1993–94	Quebec Nordiques	NHL	9	1	1	2	0	—	—	—	—	—
1994–95	Cornwall Aces	AHL	65	33	24	57	79	12	2	8	10	27
1994–95	Quebec Nordiques	NHL	8	0	3	3	2	2	0	1	1	0
1995–96	Cornwall Aces	AHL	9	5	6	11	10	—	—	—	—	—
1995–96	Colorado Avalanche	NHL	33	3	6	9	33	8	3	2	5	2
1996–97	Colorado Avalanche	NHL	76	12	15	27	67	17	2	2	4	27
1997–98	Colorado Avalanche	NHL	68	16	12	28	133	2	0	0	0	2
1998–99	Colorado Avalanche	NHL	53	8	14	22	58	—	—	—	—	—
1998–99	Calgary Flames	NHL	20	5	4	9	10	—	—	—	—	—
1999–00	Calgary Flames	NHL	48	4	10	14	60	—	—	—	—	—
1999–00	Pittsburgh Penguins	NHL	4	1	0	1	0	7	1	1	2	9
2000–01	Pittsburgh Penguins	NHL	43	8	9	17	57	17	1	0	1	12
2001–02	Adler Mannheim	DEL	32	17	9	26	32	2	0	2	2	0
2002–03	Alder Mannheim	DEL	29	4	8	12	49	8	2	1	3	30
2003–04	Adler Mannheim	DEL	44	22	17	39	78	6	1	2	3	24
2004–05	Adler Mannheim	DEL	48	19	19	38	121	14	11	3	14	22
2005–06	Adler Mannheim	DEL	21	11	10	21	48	—	—	—	—	—
2006–07	Adler Mannheim	DEL	51	25	17	42	80	11	4	6	10	32
2007–08	Adler Mannheim	DEL	43	15	20	35	118	5	0	1	1	10
2008–09	Adler Mannheim	DEL	46	17	15	32	96	9	2	5	7	8
2009–10	Frisk Tigers	GET	34	16	24	40	53	—	—	—	—	—
2010–11	Frisk Tigers	GET	38	25	18	43	95	5	2	3	5	2
NHL totals			362	58	74	132	420	53	7	6	13	52
DEL totals			314	130	115	245	622	55	20	20	40	126

== Awards and achievements ==
Award	Year
QMJHL
All-Rookie Team	1990–91
Michel Bergeron Trophy	1990–91
First All-Star Team	1992–93
Jean Béliveau Trophy	1992–93
CHL First All-Star Team	1992–93
AHL
Dudley "Red" Garrett Memorial Award	1993–94
NHL
Stanley Cup (Colorado Avalanche)	1995–96
DEL
All-Star Game	2004, 2007
Champion (Adler Mannheim)	2007
