= 1998 Stanley Cup Final =

1998 ice hockey championship series

	1	2	3	4	Total
Detroit Red Wings	2	5*	2	4	4
Washington Capitals	1	4*	1	1	0
- * – Denotes overtime period(s)
- Location(s): Detroit: Joe Louis Arena (1, 2); Washington: MCI Center (3, 4)
- Coaches: Detroit: Scotty Bowman; Washington: Ron Wilson
- Captains: Detroit: Steve Yzerman; Washington: Dale Hunter
- National anthems: Detroit: Karen Newman; Washington: Robert "Bob" McDonald
- Referees: Bill McCreary (1, 4); Don Koharski (2); Terry Gregson (3)
- Dates: June 9–16, 1998
- MVP: Steve Yzerman (Red Wings)
- Series-winning goal: Martin Lapointe (2:26, second)
- Hall of Famers: Red Wings: Sergei Fedorov (2015); Viacheslav Fetisov (2001); Igor Larionov (2008); Nicklas Lidstrom (2015); Larry Murphy (2004); Brendan Shanahan (2013); Steve Yzerman (2009); Capitals: Phil Housley (2015); Adam Oates (2012); Coaches: Scotty Bowman (1991); Officials: Bill McCreary (2014); Ray Scapinello (2008)
- Networks: Canada: (English): CBC (French): SRC; United States: (English): Fox (1), ESPN (2–4)
- Announcers: (CBC) Bob Cole and Harry Neale (SRC) Claude Quenneville and Gilles Tremblay (Fox) Mike Emrick and John Davidson (ESPN) Gary Thorne and Bill Clement

The 1998 Stanley Cup Final was the championship series of the National Hockey League's (NHL) 1997–98 season, and the culmination of the 1998 Stanley Cup playoffs. It was contested by the Western Conference champion and defending Stanley Cup champion Detroit Red Wings and the Eastern Conference champion Washington Capitals. It was the 105th year of the Stanley Cup being contested. The series was the Capitals' first Stanley Cup Final appearance in franchise history. The Red Wings swept the Capitals to repeat as Stanley Cup champions, capturing their ninth Stanley Cup in team history. This marked the fourth consecutive, and most recent, Stanley Cup Final to end in a sweep.

The Red Wings became the fourth franchise to win the Stanley Cup in back-to-back sweeps, joining the Toronto Maple Leafs, Montreal Canadiens, and New York Islanders, and remain the most recent team to accomplish this feat.

Detroit coach Scotty Bowman won his eighth Stanley Cup in that capacity (having previously done so with the Montreal Canadiens in 1973, 1976, 1977, 1978, and 1979, the Pittsburgh Penguins in 1992, and the Wings the previous year), tying him with former Canadiens coach Toe Blake for the record of most Cups won by a coach (which he would break when he helped the Red Wings win the 2002 Cup).

== Motivation to win a second straight title ==
Just six days after sweeping the Philadelphia Flyers in the 1997 Finals, Red Wings defenceman Vladimir Konstantinov and masseur Sergei Mnatsakanov sustained serious brain injuries when the limousine in which they were riding crashed. Viacheslav Fetisov was also in the limousine but was not seriously injured. The Red Wings subsequently dedicated their 1997–98 season to the two injured members and wore a patch on their jerseys bearing the players' initials. When the Red Wings were presented with the Stanley Cup, they wheeled Konstantinov onto the ice and placed the Cup in his lap. They also took him for a victory lap around the rink.

== Paths to the Finals ==
=== Detroit Red Wings ===
Detroit advanced to the Finals by defeating the Phoenix Coyotes, St. Louis Blues, and Dallas Stars in six games each.

=== Washington Capitals ===
Washington defeated the Boston Bruins 4–2, the Ottawa Senators 4–1, and the Buffalo Sabres 4–2.

== Game summaries ==
In this series, Capitals head coach Ron Wilson became the first person to head coach in both an Olympics and a Stanley Cup Final in the same year, having coached team USA at the Nagano Olympics. Peter Laviolette would join him in this feat in 2006 while with the Carolina Hurricanes during their championship season, having coached the American ice hockey team during the Torino Olympics.

=== Game one ===
June 9	Washington Capitals	1–2	Detroit Red Wings	Joe Louis Arena	Recap

At home, Detroit took an early lead in the first period and scored two goals within two minutes and 14 seconds of each other. The Red Wings were able to hold off a Washington assault and take the first game of the series with a score of 2–1.

Scoring summary
Period	Team	Goal	Assist(s)	Time	Score
1st	DET	Joe Kocur (4)	Doug Brown (1) and Tomas Holmstrom (9)	14:04	1–0 DET
1st	DET	Nicklas Lidstrom (6)	Steve Yzerman (17) and Tomas Holmstrom (10)	16:18	2–0 DET
2nd	WSH	Richard Zednik (7)	Andrei Nikolishin (12) and Peter Bondra (5)	15:57	2–1 DET
3rd	None				
Penalty summary
Period	Team	Player	Penalty	Time	PIM
1st	DET	Martin Lapointe	Tripping	04:21	2:00
1st	WSH	Mark Tinordi	Interference	17:22	2:00
2nd	DET	Bench (served by Vyacheslav Kozlov)	Too many men on the ice	05:48	2:00
2nd	DET	Steve Yzerman	Slashing	08:51	2:00
2nd	WSH	Chris Simon	Roughing	18:06	2:00
3rd	WSH	Andrei Nikolishin	Interference	00:38	2:00
3rd	DET	Joe Kocur	Roughing	04:19	2:00

Shots by period
Team	1	2	3	Total
WSH	6	4	7	17
DET	10	9	12	31

=== Game two ===
June 11	Washington Capitals	4–5	OT	Detroit Red Wings	Joe Louis Arena	Recap

It looked as if the Capitals were to tie the series with a 4–2 lead in the third period, but after a Detroit goal to make it 4–3, Capitals forward Esa Tikkanen had a scoring opportunity midway through the third period that would have likely put Detroit away before the venue changed back to Washington's MCI Center, and also would have changed the entire dynamic of the series, but he missed the open net shot. Detroit then rallied late in the third period to tie the game and send it into overtime. Kris Draper scored with four minutes left in the first overtime to give the Red Wings a 5–4 victory and a 2–0 lead in the series.

Scoring summary
Period	Team	Goal	Assist(s)	Time	Score
1st	DET	Steve Yzerman (5)	Tomas Holmstrom (11) and Nicklas Lidstrom (13)	07:49	1–0 DET
2nd	WSH	Peter Bondra (7)	Andrei Nikolishin (13) and Jeff Brown (1)	01:51	1–1
2nd	WSH	Chris Simon (1)	Jeff Brown (2) and Dale Hunter (4)	06:11	2–1 WSH
2nd	WSH	Adam Oates (6)	Joe Juneau (8) and Calle Johansson (8)	11:03	3–1 WSH
3rd	DET	Steve Yzerman (6) – sh	Viacheslav Fetisov (1) and Darren McCarty (7)	06:37	3–2 WSH
3rd	WSH	Joe Juneau (7) – pp	Sergei Gonchar (4) and Brian Bellows (7)	07:05	4–2 WSH
3rd	DET	Martin Lapointe (8)	Igor Larionov (9) and Viacheslav Fetisov (2)	08:08	4–3 WSH
3rd	DET	Doug Brown (2)	Unassisted	15:46	4–4
OT	DET	Kris Draper (1)	Martin Lapointe (6) and Brendan Shanahan (4)	15:24	5–4 DET
Penalty summary
Period	Team	Player	Penalty	Time	PIM
1st	WSH	Joe Reekie	Holding – Obstruction	13:05	2:00
1st	WSH	Peter Bondra	Hooking – Obstruction	15:22	2:00
2nd	DET	Kirk Maltby	High-sticking	03:09	2:00
2nd	WSH	Richard Zednik	Hooking – Obstruction	07:12	2:00
2nd	DET	Chris Osgood	Unsportsmanlike conduct	14:11	2:00
2nd	WSH	Chris Simon	Roughing	14:11	2:00
2nd	DET	Kirk Maltby	Slashing	16:20	2:00
3rd	DET	Nicklas Lidstrom	Interference	06:23	2:00
3rd	WSH	Richard Zednik	Cross checking	10:18	2:00
3rd	DET	Martin Lapointe	Interference	11:40	2:00
OT	DET	Joe Kocur	Roughing	05:24	2:00
OT	WSH	Esa Tikkanen	Roughing	05:24	2:00

Shots by period
Team	1	2	3	OT	Total
WSH	8	15	7	3	33
DET	14	14	20	12	60

=== Game three ===
June 13	Detroit Red Wings	2–1	Washington Capitals	MCI Center	Recap

Detroit scored in the first 35 seconds to take an early lead which held up until the third period. The Capitals tied the game midway through the third period, but Sergei Fedorov scored to give the Wings a three games to none lead in the series.

Scoring summary
Period	Team	Goal	Assist(s)	Time	Score
1st	DET	Tomas Holmstrom (7)	Steve Yzerman (18) and Darren McCarty (8)	00:35	1–0 DET
2nd	None				
3rd	WSH	Brian Bellows (5) – pp	Adam Oates (10) and Joe Juneau (9)	10:35	1–1
3rd	DET	Sergei Fedorov (10)	Doug Brown (2) and Viacheslav Fetisov (3)	15:09	2–1 DET
Penalty summary
Period	Team	Player	Penalty	Time	PIM
1st	WSH	Chris Simon	Slashing	02:48	2:00
1st	WSH	Dale Hunter	Charging	08:10	2:00
1st	WSH	Phil Housley	Elbowing	12:29	2:00
1st	DET	Tomas Holmstrom	Goaltender interference	13:11	2:00
1st	DET	Martin Lapointe	Interference	17:01	2:00
2nd	WSH	Todd Krygier	Roughing	02:05	2:00
2nd	DET	Anders Eriksson	Holding – Obstruction	07:29	2:00
2nd	DET	Igor Larionov	Tripping – Obstruction	10:17	2:00
2nd	DET	Kris Draper	Roughing	15:23	2:00
2nd	WSH	Sergei Gonchar	Roughing	15:23	2:00
3rd	WSH	Sergei Gonchar	Roughing	05:50	2:00
3rd	DET	Darren McCarty	Tripping	09:22	2:00

Shots by period
Team	1	2	3	Total
DET	13	11	10	34
WSH	1	12	5	18

=== Game four ===
June 16	Detroit Red Wings	4–1	Washington Capitals	MCI Center	Recap

In game four, Detroit was dominant throughout to win the game by a score of 4–1 and sweep the series. Steve Yzerman was awarded the Conn Smythe Trophy as the most valuable player in the playoffs. When the Cup was awarded, Vladimir Konstantinov was brought onto the ice in his wheelchair and joined the celebration with his team.

Scoring summary
Period	Team	Goal	Assist(s)	Time	Score
1st	DET	Doug Brown (3) – pp	Sergei Fedorov (9) and Larry Murphy (12)	10:30	1–0 DET
2nd	DET	Martin Lapointe (9)	Igor Larionov (10) and Bob Rouse (3)	02:26	2–0 DET
2nd	WSH	Brian Bellows (6)	Adam Oates (11) and Joe Juneau (10)	07:49	2–1 DET
2nd	DET	Larry Murphy (3) – pp	Tomas Holmstrom (12) and Sergei Fedorov (10)	11:46	3–1 DET
3rd	DET	Doug Brown (4) – pp	Vyacheslav Kozlov (8) and Anders Eriksson (5)	01:32	4–1 DET
Penalty summary
Period	Team	Player	Penalty	Time	PIM
1st	DET	Anders Eriksson	Interference	07:17	2:00
1st	WSH	Peter Bondra	Interference	09:12	2:00
1st	WSH	Calle Johansson	Roughing	11:01	2:00
2nd	DET	Kris Draper	Roughing	09:13	2:00
2nd	WSH	Mark Tinordi	Roughing	09:13	2:00
2nd	WSH	Esa Tikkanen	Goaltender interference	11:02	2:00
2nd	DET	Igor Larionov	Hooking	12:41	2:00
2nd	DET	Bob Rouse	High-sticking	16:07	2:00
2nd	WSH	Mark Tinordi	Slashing	19:53	2:00
3rd	DET	Viacheslav Fetisov	Roughing	13:08	2:00

Shots by period
Team	1	2	3	Total
DET	14	12	12	38
WSH	6	14	11	31

== Team rosters ==
Bolded years under Finals appearance indicates year won Stanley Cup.

=== Detroit Red Wings ===
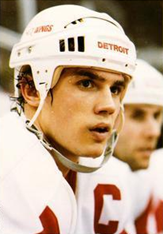
Steve Yzerman captained the Red Wings to the Final for the third time in four seasons.

#	Nat	Player	Position	Hand	Acquired	Place of birth	Finals appearance
30	(Canada)	Chris Osgood	G	L	1991	Peace River, Alberta	third (1995, **1997**)
31	(Canada)	Kevin Hodson	G	L	1993–94	Winnipeg, Manitoba	second (**1997**)
2	(Russia)	Viacheslav Fetisov	D	L	1994–95	Moscow, Soviet Union	third (1995, **1997**)
3	(Canada)	Bob Rouse	D	R	1994–95	Surrey, British Columbia	third (1995, **1997**)
5	(Sweden)	Nicklas Lidstrom – **A**	D	L	1989	Krylbo, Sweden	third (1995, **1997**)
15	(Russia)	Dmitri Mironov	D	R	1997–98	Moscow, Soviet Union	first (did not play)
16	(Russia)	Vladimir Konstantinov	D	R	1989	Murmansk, Soviet Union	third (1995, **1997**) (did not play)
27	(Canada)	Aaron Ward	D	R	1993–94	Windsor, Ontario	second (**1997**) (did not play)
34	(Canada)	Jamie Macoun	D	L	1997–98	Newmarket, Ontario	third (1986, **1989**)
44	(Sweden)	Anders Eriksson	D	L	1993	Bollnäs, Sweden	first
55	(Canada)	Larry Murphy	D	R	1996–97	Scarborough, Ontario	fourth (**1991**, **1992**, **1997**)
8	(Russia)	Igor Larionov	C	L	1995–96	Voskresensk, Soviet Union	second (**1997**)
11	(Canada)	Mathieu Dandenault	LW	R	1994	Sherbrooke, Quebec	second (**1997**) (did not play)
13	(Russia)	Vyacheslav Kozlov	LW	L	1990	Voskresensk, Soviet Union	third (1995, **1997**)
14	(Canada)	Brendan Shanahan – **A**	LW	R	1996–97	Etobicoke, Ontario	second (**1997**)
17	(United States)	Doug Brown	RW	R	1994–95	Southborough, Massachusetts	third (1995, **1997**)
18	(Canada)	Kirk Maltby	RW	R	1995–96	Guelph, Ontario	second (**1997**)
19	(Canada)	Steve Yzerman – **C**	C	R	1983	Burnaby, British Columbia	third (1995, **1997**)
20	(Canada)	Martin Lapointe	RW	R	1991	Ville St. Pierre, Quebec	third (1995, **1997**)
22	(United States)	Mike Knuble	RW	R	1991	Toronto, Ontario	first (did not play)
25	(Canada)	Darren McCarty	RW	R	1992	Burnaby, British Columbia	third (1995, **1997**)
26	(Canada)	Joe Kocur	RW	R	1996–97	Kelvington, Saskatchewan	third (**1994**, **1997**)
33	(Canada)	Kris Draper	C	L	1993–94	Toronto, Ontario	third (1995, **1997**)
41	(Canada)	Brent Gilchrist	C	L	1997–98	Moose Jaw, Saskatchewan	second (1989) (did not play)
91	(Russia)	Sergei Fedorov	C	L	1989	Pskov, Soviet Union	third (1995, **1997**)
96	(Sweden)	Tomas Holmstrom	LW	L	1994	Piteå, Sweden	second (**1997**)

=== Washington Capitals ===
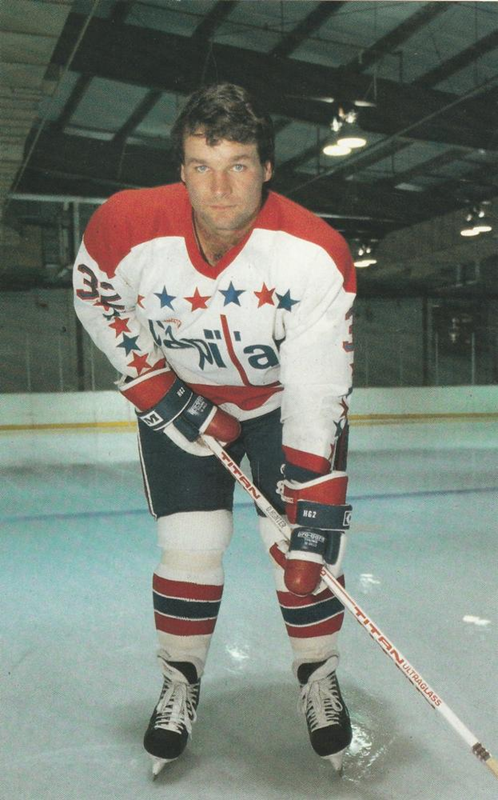
Dale Hunter (pictured in 1987) captained the Capitals to their first Stanley Cup Final appearance in history.

#	Nat	Player	Position	Hand	Acquired	Place of birth	Finals appearance
30	(Canada)	Bill Ranford	G	L	1996–97	Brandon, Manitoba	third (**1988**, **1990**) (did not play)
37	(Germany)	Olaf Kolzig	G	L	1989	Johannesburg, South Africa	first
2	(United States)	Ken Klee	D	R	1990	Indianapolis, Indiana	first
6	(Sweden)	Calle Johansson – **A**	D	L	1988–89	Gothenburg, Sweden	first
19	(Canada)	Brendan Witt	D	L	1993	Humboldt, Saskatchewan	first (did not play)
24	(Canada)	Mark Tinordi	D	L	1994–95	Red Deer, Alberta	second (1991)
28	(Canada)	Jeff Brown	D	R	1997–98	Ottawa, Ontario	second (1994)
29	(Canada)	Joe Reekie	D	L	1993–94	Victoria, British Columbia	first
55	(Russia)	Sergei Gonchar	D	L	1992	Chelyabinsk, Soviet Union	first
96	(United States)	Phil Housley	D	L	1996–97	Saint Paul, Minnesota	first
9	(United States)	Todd Krygier	LW	L	1995–96	Chicago Heights, Illinois	first
10	(United States)	Kelly Miller	LW	L	1986–87	Lansing, Michigan	first
11	(Finland)	Esa Tikkanen	LW	L	1997–98	Helsinki, Finland	sixth (**1985**, **1987**, **1988**, **1990**, **1994**)
12	(Slovakia)	Peter Bondra	RW	L	1990	Bakovtsi, Soviet Union	first
13	(Russia)	Andrei Nikolishin	C	L	1996–97	Vorkuta, Soviet Union	first
17	(Canada)	Chris Simon	LW	L	1996–97	Wawa, Ontario	second (**1996**)
20	(Czech Republic)	Michal Pivonka	C	L	1984	Kladno, Czechoslovakia	first (did not play)
21	(Canada)	Jeff Toms	C	L	1997–98	Swift Current, Saskatchewan	first
22	(United States)	Steve Konowalchuk	LW	L	1991	Salt Lake City, Utah	first (did not play)
23	(Canada)	Brian Bellows	RW	R	1997–98	St. Catharines, Ontario	third (1991, **1993**)
27	(Canada)	Craig Berube	LW	L	1993–94	Calahoo, Alberta	first
32	(Canada)	Dale Hunter – **C**	C	L	1987–88	Petrolia, Ontario	first
36	(Canada)	Mike Eagles	C/RW	L	1993–94	Sussex, New Brunswick	first
44	(Slovakia)	Richard Zednik	RW	L	1994	Banská Bystrica, Czechoslovakia	first
77	(Canada)	Adam Oates – **A**	C	R	1996–97	Weston, Ontario	first
90	(Canada)	Joe Juneau	C	L	1993–94	Pont-Rouge, Quebec	first

== Stanley Cup engraving ==
The 1998 Stanley Cup was presented to Red Wings captain Steve Yzerman by NHL Commissioner Gary Bettman following the Red Wings 4–1 win over the Capitals in game four

The following Red Wings players and staff had their names engraved on the Stanley Cup

1997–98 Detroit Red Wings

=== Players ===
Centres

- 8 Igor Larionov
- 19 Steve Yzerman (Captain)
- 33 Kris Draper
- 41 Brent Gilchrist*
- 91 Sergei Fedorov

Wingers

- 11 Mathieu Dandenault*
- 17 Doug Brown
- 14 Brendan Shanahan (A)
- 18 Kirk Maltby
- 20 Martin Lapointe
- 22 Mike Knuble*
- 25 Darren McCarty
- 26 Joe Kocur
- 13 Vyacheslav Kozlov
- 96 Tomas Holmstrom

Defencemen

- 3 Bob Rouse
- 5 Nicklas Lidstrom (A)
- 2 Viacheslav Fetisov
- 15 Dmitri Mironov †
- 16 Vladimir Konstantinov †
- 27 Aaron Ward*
- 34 Jamie Macoun
- 44 Anders Eriksson
- 55 Larry Murphy

Goaltenders

- 30 Chris Osgood
- 31 Kevin Hodson
- * Did not play or dress in the Final.
- † Exemption granted to engrave the name of a player who did not automatically qualify. (Note: Automatic qualification for a player's name to be engraved on the Stanley Cup: Playing in (for a goaltender, dressing for) at least one Stanley Cup Final game or at least half of regular season games for the Stanley Cup winning team.)

=== Coaching and administrative staff ===
- Mike Ilitch Sr. (Owner/President/Governor), Marian Ilitch (Owner/Secretary-Treasurer), Atanas Ilitch (Vice President/minority Owner)
- Christopher Ilitch (Vice President/minority owner), Denise Ilitch Lites, Ronald Ilitch (Minority Owners)
- Michael Ititch Jr., Lisa Ilitch Murray, Carole Ilitch Trepeck (Minority Owners)
- Jim Devellano (Sr. Vice President), Ken Holland (General Manager), Don Waddell (Assistant General Manager), William Scotty Bowman (Head Coach/Director of Player Personnel)
- Barry Smith (Associate Coach), Dave Lewis (Associate Coach), Jim Nill (Director of Player Development/Director of Amateur Scouting), Dan Belise (Pro Scout), Mark Howe (Pro Scout)
- Jim Bedard (Goaltending Consultant), Hakan Andersson (Director of European Scouting), Mark Leach (Scout), Joe McDonnell (Scout)
- Bruce Haralson (Scout), John Wharton (Athletic Trainer), Paul Boyer (Equipment Manager), Tim Abbott (Asst. Equipment Manager)
- Bob Huddleston (Massage Therapist), Sergei Mnatsakanov (Masseur), Wally Crossman (Dressing Room Assistant)

=== Engraving notes ===
- Detroit successfully requested an exemption to engrave the names of two players who did not automatically qualify.
  - #16 Vladimir Konstantinov (D) – career ended in a car accident. The Red Wings still recognized him as part of the team and got permission from the league to have his name engraved.
  - #15 Dmitri Mironov (D) – played 66 regular season games for Anaheim before joining Detroit. Played 11 regular season games and 7 playoff games (none in the Finals) for Detroit.
- Wally Crossman was the oldest person engraved on the Stanley Cup at age 87.
- Detroit wanted to include a record 55 names on the Stanley Cup in 1997–98. Following that request, the NHL decided to limit the number of names to 52 to make sure all names fit on the Cup. No player who officially qualifies may be left off to include more non-players.
- #34 Norm Maracle (G – 4 regular season games) and #21 Darryl Laplante (D – 2 regular season games) were on the roster during the Final, but left off the Stanley Cup engraving due to not qualifying. None played in the playoffs. Detroit did not request an exemption to engrave their names. All were included in the team picture.
- Art Mnatsusakanov, Johnny Remejes, and Mike Vella (Dressing Room Asst.); were left off the Stanley Cup engraving, but included in the team picture.

== Broadcasting ==
In Canada, the series was televised on CBC. In the United States, Fox broadcast game one while ESPN televised games two through four. Had the series extended, games five and seven would have been broadcast on Fox, and ESPN would have aired game six.

== See also ==
- 1997–98 NHL season
- List of Stanley Cup champions

== Notes ==
Preceded by Detroit Red Wings; 1997	Detroit Red Wings; Stanley Cup champions 1998	Succeeded by Dallas Stars; 1999
