= 1997 Stanley Cup Final =

1997 ice hockey championship series

	1	2	3	4	Total
Detroit Red Wings	4	4	6	2	4
Philadelphia Flyers	2	2	1	1	0
- Location(s): Detroit: Joe Louis Arena (3, 4); Philadelphia: CoreStates Center (1, 2)
- Coaches: Detroit: Scotty Bowman; Philadelphia: Terry Murray
- Captains: Detroit: Steve Yzerman; Philadelphia: Eric Lindros
- National anthems: Detroit: Karen Newman; Philadelphia: Lauren Hart
- Referees: Bill McCreary (1, 4); Terry Gregson (2); Kerry Fraser (3)
- Dates: May 31 – June 7, 1997
- MVP: Mike Vernon (Red Wings)
- Series-winning goal: Darren McCarty (13:02, second)
- Hall of Famers: Red Wings: Sergei Fedorov (2015); Viacheslav Fetisov (2001); Igor Larionov (2008); Nicklas Lidstrom (2015); Larry Murphy (2004); Brendan Shanahan (2013); Mike Vernon (2023); Steve Yzerman (2009); Flyers: Paul Coffey (2004); Dale Hawerchuk (2001); Eric Lindros (2016); Coaches: Scotty Bowman (1991); Officials: Bill McCreary (2014)
- Networks: Canada: (English): CBC (French): SRC; United States: (English): Fox (1), ESPN (2–4)
- Announcers: (CBC) Bob Cole and Harry Neale (SRC) Claude Quenneville and Gilles Tremblay (Fox) Mike Emrick and John Davidson (ESPN) Gary Thorne and Bill Clement

The 1997 Stanley Cup Final was the championship series of the National Hockey League's (NHL) 1996–97 season, and the culmination of the 1997 Stanley Cup playoffs. It was contested by the Detroit Red Wings and the Philadelphia Flyers. The Red Wings made the Finals for the second time in three years, while the Flyers were making their first appearance in a decade. The Red Wings swept the Flyers to win the Stanley Cup for the eighth time in franchise history and for the first time since 1955, ending what was the longest Stanley Cup drought in the league at that time.

The Red Wings were the last team to win the Cup without home ice advantage in the Finals and with fewer than 100 points earned during the regular season until 2009.

== Paths to the Final ==
=== Philadelphia Flyers ===
Philadelphia rose to the top on the back of a 17-game unbeaten streak in December and January, and, despite losing the Atlantic Division title to New Jersey, were successful with the Pittsburgh Penguins and Buffalo Sabres in the first two rounds. The Flyers arrived into the Stanley Cup Final having beaten their rivals, the New York Rangers, in a five-game Eastern Conference finals series. Eric Lindros and Wayne Gretzky each recorded a hat trick in the set, but the size, strength and discipline of Philadelphia (particularly the Legion of Doom line) trumped the veteran savvy of the Blueshirts.

=== Detroit Red Wings ===
For Detroit there was the departure of several players whom head coach Scotty Bowman blamed for their loss to Colorado a year prior, including trading away Paul Coffey to get star Brendan Shanahan. Detroit won 38 games in the regular season, in contrast to the record-setting 62 win season the previous year, making them the dark horse in the Western Conference as the third seed behind the Dallas Stars and the Presidents' Trophy winner Colorado Avalanche. In the playoffs, the Wings dispatched a fractured St. Louis Blues team in six games, and a surprising Mighty Ducks of Anaheim in a sweep to reach the Western Conference finals for the third straight season. In a rematch of last year's Western finals, the Red Wings upset the defending Stanley Cup champion Avalanche in six brutal games to earn their second trip to the Stanley Cup Final in three years.

This is the first time that these two teams met in the postseason.

== Game summaries ==
=== Game one ===
May 31	Detroit Red Wings	4–2	Philadelphia Flyers	CoreStates Center	Recap

Game one in Philadelphia took place exactly ten years to the day after the Flyers' emotional seventh-game loss to the Edmonton Oilers in the 1987 Final. Detroit never trailed in the game: they led 2–1 after the first period, 3–2 after the second, and Steve Yzerman scored the fourth goal 56 seconds into the third period. Sergei Fedorov scored the winner and was named the game's first star.

Scoring summary
Period	Team	Goal	Assist(s)	Time	Score
1st	DET	Kirk Maltby (4) – sh	Kris Draper (4)	06:38	1–0 DET
1st	PHI	Rod Brind'Amour (11) – pp	Eric Lindros (13) and Janne Niinimaa (10)	07:37	1–1
1st	DET	Joe Kocur (1)	Unassisted	15:56	2–1 DET
2nd	DET	Sergei Fedorov (6)	Larry Murphy (7) and Darren McCarty (3)	11:41	3–1 DET
2nd	PHI	John LeClair (8)	Mikael Renberg (6) and Eric Lindros (14)	17:11	3–2 DET
3rd	DET	Steve Yzerman (5)	Larry Murphy (8)	00:56	4–2 DET
Penalty summary
Period	Team	Player	Penalty	Time	PIM
1st	DET	Tomas Sandstrom	High-sticking	05:50	2:00
1st	DET	Viacheslav Fetisov	Interference	11:26	2:00
1st	PHI	Trent Klatt	Interference	17:09	2:00
1st	DET	Joe Kocur	Interference	19:42	2:00
2nd	PHI	Daniel Lacroix	Interference	05:48	2:00
2nd	DET	Sergei Fedorov	Tripping	07:08	2:00
2nd	DET	Viacheslav Fetisov	Interference	15:07	2:00
2nd	PHI	Trent Klatt	Charging	17:45	2:00
3rd	PHI	Petr Svoboda	Cross-checking	06:27	2:00
3rd	PHI	Eric Lindros	Roughing	17:48	2:00

Shots by period
Team	1	2	3	Total
DET	8	12	10	30
PHI	10	9	9	28

=== Game two ===
June 3	Detroit Red Wings	4–2	Philadelphia Flyers	CoreStates Center	Recap

Brendan Shanahan scored an unassisted goal 1:37 into the game and Steve Yzerman scored a power-play goal at 9:22 of the first period to give the Red Wings a 2–0 lead before Rod Brind'Amour scored a pair of power-play goals late in the first period to tie the score. In the second, Kirk Maltby scored the game-winning goal at 2:39 and Shanahan scored his second goal of the game at 9:56 of the third and the Red Wings won a second consecutive 4–2 victory and a 2–0 series lead heading back to Joe Louis Arena.

Scoring summary
Period	Team	Goal	Assist(s)	Time	Score
1st	DET	Brendan Shanahan (7)	Unassisted	01:37	1–0 DET
1st	DET	Steve Yzerman (6) – pp	Larry Murphy (9) and Viacheslav Fetisov (3)	09:22	2–0 DET
1st	PHI	Rod Brind'Amour (12) – pp	Janne Niinimaa (11)	17:42	2–1 DET
1st	PHI	Rod Brind'Amour (13) – pp	Janne Niinimaa (12) and John LeClair (12)	18:51	2–2
2nd	DET	Kirk Maltby (5)	Joe Kocur (3)	02:39	3–2 DET
3rd	DET	Brendan Shanahan (8)	Martin Lapointe (8) and Sergei Fedorov (10)	09:56	4–2 DET
Penalty summary
Period	Team	Player	Penalty	Time	PIM
1st	PHI	Paul Coffey	Holding	04:29	2:00
1st	PHI	Paul Coffey	Hooking	07:24	2:00
1st	DET	Martin Lapointe	Charging	10:21	2:00
1st	DET	Viacheslav Fetisov	High-sticking	17:09	2:00
1st	DET	Igor Larionov	Hooking	18:37	2:00
2nd	DET	Kirk Maltby	Roughing	06:54	2:00
2nd	PHI	Paul Coffey	Roughing	06:54	2:00
2nd	DET	Bench (Served by Doug Brown)	Too many men on the ice	09:03	2:00
2nd	PHI	John LeClair	Elbowing	12:13	2:00
3rd	DET	Martin Lapointe	Roughing	10:27	2:00
3rd	PHI	Karl Dykhuis	Roughing	10:27	2:00

Shots by period
Team	1	2	3	Total
DET	14	9	5	28
PHI	14	9	8	31

=== Game three ===
June 5	Philadelphia Flyers	1–6	Detroit Red Wings	Joe Louis Arena	Recap

John LeClair scored at 7:03 of the first period to give the Flyers their first lead of the series. Two minutes later, Yzerman scored on the power-play to tie the score. Fedorov scored two minutes later to put Detroit ahead for good in the game. Martin Lapointe scored later in the first to give the Wings a 3–1 advantage. The Wings tacked on two more in the second and added one in the third for a decisive 6–1 win and a three-games-to-none series advantage. For his four-point night, Fedorov was named the game's first star.

In his post-game comments, Flyers head coach Terry Murray was quoted as saying the team was "basically in a choking situation," which many observers interpreted as Murray having called out his own players as chokers. The manner in which they played compounded by the insurmountable series deficit along with the Wings' seeming dominance in stretches of the first two games as well as most of game three lent credence to the claim.

Scoring summary
Period	Team	Goal	Assist(s)	Time	Score
1st	PHI	John LeClair (9) – pp	Eric Desjardins (7) and John LeClair (8)	07:03	1–0 PHI
1st	DET	Steve Yzerman (7) – pp	Vyacheslav Kozlov (4)	09:03	1–1
1st	DET	Sergei Fedorov (7)	Unassisted	11:05	2–1 DET
1st	DET	Martin Lapointe (3)	Doug Brown (3) and Sergei Fedorov (11)	19:00	3–1 DET
2nd	DET	Sergei Fedorov (8) – pp	Vyacheslav Kozlov (5) and Brendan Shanahan (8)	03:12	4–1 DET
2nd	DET	Brendan Shanahan (9)	Darren McCarty (4) and Viacheslav Fetisov (4)	19:17	5–1 DET
3rd	DET	Martin Lapointe (4) – pp	Sergei Fedorov (12) and Mike Vernon (1)	01:08	6–1 DET
Penalty summary
Period	Team	Player	Penalty	Time	PIM
1st	DET	Darren McCarty	Interference – Obstruction	06:10	2:00
1st	PHI	Eric Desjardins	Holding – Obstruction	08:44	2:00
1st	DET	Viacheslav Fetisov	Interference – Obstruction	12:14	2:00
1st	DET	Tomas Sandstrom	Holding – Obstruction	12:54	2:00
1st	DET	Martin Lapointe	Tripping	16:43	2:00
2nd	PHI	Trent Klatt	Hooking – Obstruction	02:24	2:00
2nd	PHI	Michel Petit	Holding	10:14	2:00
3rd	PHI	Eric Lindros	Cross-checking	00:46	2:00
3rd	PHI	Eric Lindros	Elbowing	08:12	2:00
3rd	DET	Darren McCarty	Interference – Obstruction	08:39	2:00
3rd	DET	Viacheslav Fetisov	Slashing	13:02	2:00
3rd	DET	Doug Brown	Slashing	19:41	2:00

Shots by period
Team	1	2	3	Total
PHI	8	7	7	22
DET	10	12	7	29

=== Game four ===
June 7	Philadelphia Flyers	1–2	Detroit Red Wings	Joe Louis Arena	Recap

The Red Wings controlled the game from the get-go, forging ahead 1–0 after one period and employing the left-wing lock to keep the Flyers' mix of big and speedy forwards at bay. Darren McCarty's second-period tally effectively sealed the deal. The burly checker faked out Flyers rookie defenceman Janne Niinimaa inside the blue line, swooped around him, then did a quick cutback in front of Hextall in his crease to slip the puck into the net. Eric Lindros would score his lone goal of the series with 15 seconds to play. The 2–1 win brought Detroit its eighth Stanley Cup, and its first in 42 seasons, ending what was the longest Stanley Cup drought in the league at that time.

Sergei Fedorov led the Wings in playoff scoring with 20 points. Detroit goaltender Mike Vernon, who had been in net for the whole of the Wings' failed 1995 playoff run, and relegated to the bench the year before, earned vindication and his first Conn Smythe Trophy as playoff MVP by holding Philadelphia to six goals in four games.

Scoring summary
Period	Team	Goal	Assist(s)	Time	Score
1st	DET	Nicklas Lidstrom (2)	Kirk Maltby (2)	19:27	1–0 DET
2nd	DET	Darren McCarty (3)	Tomas Sandstrom (4) and Steve Yzerman (6)	13:02	2–0 DET
3rd	PHI	Eric Lindros (12)	Eric Desjardins (8)	19:45	2–1 DET
Penalty summary
Period	Team	Player	Penalty	Time	PIM
1st	PHI	John LeClair	Holding – Obstruction	03:23	2:00
1st	DET	Igor Larionov	Interference – Obstruction	04:31	2:00
1st	PHI	Eric Lindros	Interference – Obstruction	09:22	2:00
1st	PHI	Pat Falloon	Holding the stick	13:21	2:00
2nd	DET	Vladimir Konstantinov	Interference – Obstruction	09:27	2:00
3rd	PHI	Kjell Samuelsson	High-sticking	01:32	2:00
3rd	PHI	Shjon Podein	High-sticking	11:54	2:00
3rd	DET	Kris Draper	Slashing	14:39	2:00

Shots by period
Team	1	2	3	Total
PHI	8	12	7	27
DET	9	10	9	28

== Team rosters ==
Bolded years under Finals appearance indicates year won Stanley Cup.

=== Detroit Red Wings ===
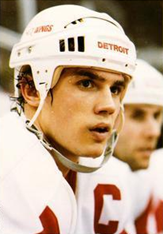
Steve Yzerman captained the Red Wings to their second Final appearance in a span of three seasons, having previously done so in 1995.

#	Nat	Player	Position	Hand	Acquired	Place of birth	Finals appearance
30	(Canada)	Chris Osgood	G	L	1991	Peace River, Alberta	second (1995) (did not play)
29	(Canada)	Mike Vernon	G	L	1994–95	Calgary, Alberta	fourth (1986, **1989**, 1995)
31	(Canada)	Kevin Hodson	G	L	1993–94	Winnipeg, Manitoba	first (did not play)
2	(Russia)	Viacheslav Fetisov	D	L	1994–95	Moscow, Soviet Union	second (1995)
3	(Canada)	Bob Rouse	D	R	1994–95	Surrey, British Columbia	second (1995)
4	(Canada)	Jamie Pushor	D	R	1991	Lethbridge, Alberta	first (did not play)
5	(Sweden)	Nicklas Lidstrom	D	L	1989	Krylbo, Sweden	second (1995)
11	(Canada)	Mathieu Dandenault	D	R	1994	Sherbrooke, Quebec	first (did not play)
16	(Russia)	Vladimir Konstantinov	D	R	1989	Murmansk, Soviet Union	second (1995)
27	(Canada)	Aaron Ward	D	R	1993–94	Windsor, Ontario	first
55	(Canada)	Larry Murphy	D	R	1996–97	Scarborough, Ontario	third (**1991**, **1992**)
8	(Russia)	Igor Larionov	C	L	1995–96	Voskresensk, Soviet Union	first
13	(Russia)	Vyacheslav Kozlov	LW	L	1990	Voskresensk, Soviet Union	second (1995)
14	(Canada)	Brendan Shanahan – **A**	LW	R	1996–97	Etobicoke, Ontario	first
15	(Sweden)	Tomas Holmstrom	LW	L	1994	Piteå, Sweden	first (did not play)
17	(United States)	Doug Brown	RW	R	1994–95	Southborough, Massachusetts	second (1995)
18	(Canada)	Kirk Maltby	RW	R	1995–96	Guelph, Ontario	first
19	(Canada)	Steve Yzerman – **C**	C	R	1983	Burnaby, British Columbia	second (1995)
20	(Canada)	Martin Lapointe	RW	R	1991	Ville St. Pierre, Quebec	second (1995)
25	(Canada)	Darren McCarty	RW	R	1992	Burnaby, British Columbia	second (1995)
26	(Canada)	Joe Kocur	RW	R	1996–97	Kelvington, Saskatchewan	second (**1994**)
28	(Sweden)	Tomas Sandstrom	LW	L	1996–97	Jakobstad, Finland	second (1993)
33	(Canada)	Kris Draper	C	L	1993–94	Toronto, Ontario	second (1995)
37	(Canada)	Tim Taylor	C	L	1993–94	Stratford, Ontario	second (1995) (did not play)
91	(Russia)	Sergei Fedorov – **A**	C	L	1989	Pskov, Soviet Union	second (1995)

=== Philadelphia Flyers ===
#	Nat	Player	Position	Hand	Acquired	Place of birth	Finals appearance
27	(Canada)	Ron Hextall	G	L	1994–95	Brandon, Manitoba	second (1987)
30	(United States)	Garth Snow	G	L	1995–96	Wrentham, Massachusetts	first
6	(Canada)	Chris Therien	D	L	1990	Ottawa, Ontario	first
8	(Canada)	Michel Petit	D	R	1996–97	Saint-Malo, Quebec	first
23	(Czech Republic)	Petr Svoboda	D	L	1994–95	Most, Czechoslovakia	third (**1986**, 1989)
24	(Canada)	Karl Dykhuis	D	L	1994–95	Sept-Îles, Quebec	first
28	(Sweden)	Kjell Samuelsson	D	R	1995–96	Tingsryd, Sweden	third (1987, **1992**)
37	(Canada)	Eric Desjardins – **A**	D	R	1994–95	Rouyn, Quebec	third (1989, **1993**)
44	(Finland)	Janne Niinimaa	D	L	1993	Raahe, Finland	first
77	(Canada)	Paul Coffey	D	L	1996–97	Weston, Ontario	seventh (1983, **1984**, **1985**, **1987**, **1991**, 1995)
9	(Lithuania)	Dainius Zubrus	LW	L	1996	Elektrėnai, Soviet Union	first
10	(United States)	John LeClair	LW	L	1994–95	St. Albans, Vermont	second (**1993**)
15	(Canada)	Pat Falloon	RW	R	1995–96	Foxwarren, Manitoba	first
17	(Canada)	Rod Brind'Amour – **A**	C	L	1991–92	Ottawa, Ontario	first
18	(Canada)	Dale Hawerchuk	C	L	1995–96	Toronto, Ontario	first
19	(Sweden)	Mikael Renberg	RW	L	1990	Piteå, Sweden	first
20	(United States)	Trent Klatt	RW	R	1995–96	Robbinsdale, Minnesota	first
21	(Canada)	Dan Kordic	LW	L	1990	Edmonton, Alberta	first
25	(United States)	Shjon Podein	LW	L	1994–95	Rochester, Minnesota	first
26	(Canada)	John Druce	RW	R	1995–96	Peterborough, Ontario	first
29	(United States)	Joel Otto	C	R	1995–96	Elk River, Minnesota	third (1986, **1989**)
32	(Canada)	Daniel Lacroix	LW	L	1996–97	Montreal, Quebec	first
45	(Czech Republic)	Vaclav Prospal	C	L	1993	České Budějovice, Czechoslovakia	first (did not play)
48	(Canada)	Colin Forbes	C	L	1994	New Westminster, British Columbia	first
88	(Canada)	Eric Lindros – **C**	C	R	1992–93	Toronto, Ontario	first

== Stanley Cup engraving ==
The 1997 Stanley Cup was presented to Red Wings captain Steve Yzerman by NHL Commissioner Gary Bettman following the Red Wings 2–1 win over the Flyers in game four

The following Red Wings players and staff had their names engraved on the Stanley Cup

1996–97 Detroit Red Wings

=== Players ===
Centres

- 19 Steve Yzerman (Captain)
- 8 Igor Larionov
- 33 Kris Draper
- 37 Tim Taylor*
- 91 Sergei Fedorov (A)

Wingers

- 13 Vyacheslav Kozlov
- 14 Brendan Shanahan (A)
- 15 Tomas Holmstrom*
- 17 Doug Brown
- 18 Kirk Maltby
- 20 Martin Lapointe
- 25 Darren McCarty
- 26 Joey Kocur
- 28 Tomas Sandstrom

Defencemen

- 2 Viacheslav Fetisov
- 3 Bob Rouse
- 4 Jamie Pushor*
- 5 Nicklas Lidstrom
- 11 Mathieu Dandenault*
- 16 Vladimir Konstantinov
- 27 Aaron Ward
- 55 Larry Murphy

Goaltenders

- 29 Mike Vernon
- 30 Chris Osgood
- 31 Kevin Hodson †
- * Did not play or dress in the Final.
- † Exemption granted to engrave the name of a player who did not automatically qualify. (Note: Automatic qualification for a player's name to be engraved on the Stanley Cup: Playing in (for a goaltender, dressing for) at least one Stanley Cup Final game or at least half of regular season games for the Stanley Cup winning team.)

=== Coaching and administrative staff ===
- Mike Ilitch Sr. (Owner/President/Governor), Marian Ilitch (Owner/Secretary-Treasurer), Atanas Ilitch (Vice President/Minority Owner)
- Christopher Ilitch (Vice President/Minority Owner), Denise Ilitch Lites, Ronald Ilitch (Minority Owners)
- Michael Ititch Jr., Lisa Ilitch Murray, Carole Ilitch Trepeck (Minority Owners)
- Jim Devellano (Sr. Vice President-of Hockey Operations), William Scotty Bowman (Head Coach/Director of Player Personnel), Ken Holland (Asst. General Manager/Goaltending Coach), Barry Smith (Associate Coach)
- Dave Lewis (Associate Coach), Mike Krushelnyski (Asst. Coach), Jim Nill (Director of Player Development/Director of Scouting), Dan Belise (Scout), Bruce Haralson (Scout)
- Mark Howe (Scout), Hakan Andersson (Scouts), John Wharton (Athletic Trainer), Wally Crossman (Dressing Room Asst.), Mark Leach (Scout)
- Paul Boyer (Equipment Manager), Tim Abbott (Asst. Equipment Manager), Sergei Mnatsakanov (Massage Therapist), Joe McDonnell (Scout)

=== Engraving notes ===
- #31 Kevin Hodson (G) – played in 6 regular season games (dressed for 23), but was a healthy scratch for the entire playoffs. As he did not automatically qualify, Detroit successfully requested an exemption to engrave his name.
- #22 Mike Knuble (RW) – played in 9 regular season games, but none in the playoffs. He was on the roster during the Finals, but left off the Stanley Cup engraving due to not qualifying by playing in 41 regular season games or 1 Finals game for Detroit. Detroit did not request an exemption to engrave his name. He was included in the team picture.
- Johnny Remejes (Dressing Room Asst.), Mike Vella (Dressing Room Asst). Each of the three members and many other members were left off the Stanley Cup engraving, but included in the team picture.

== Broadcasting ==
In Canada, the series was televised on CBC. In the United States, Fox broadcast game one while ESPN televised games two through four. Had the series extended, games five and seven would have been broadcast on Fox, and ESPN would have aired game six.

== See also ==
- 1996–97 NHL season

== Notes ==
Preceded by Colorado Avalanche; 1996	Detroit Red Wings; Stanley Cup champions 1997	Succeeded by Detroit Red Wings; 1998
