= Kris Draper =

Canadian ice hockey player (born 1971)

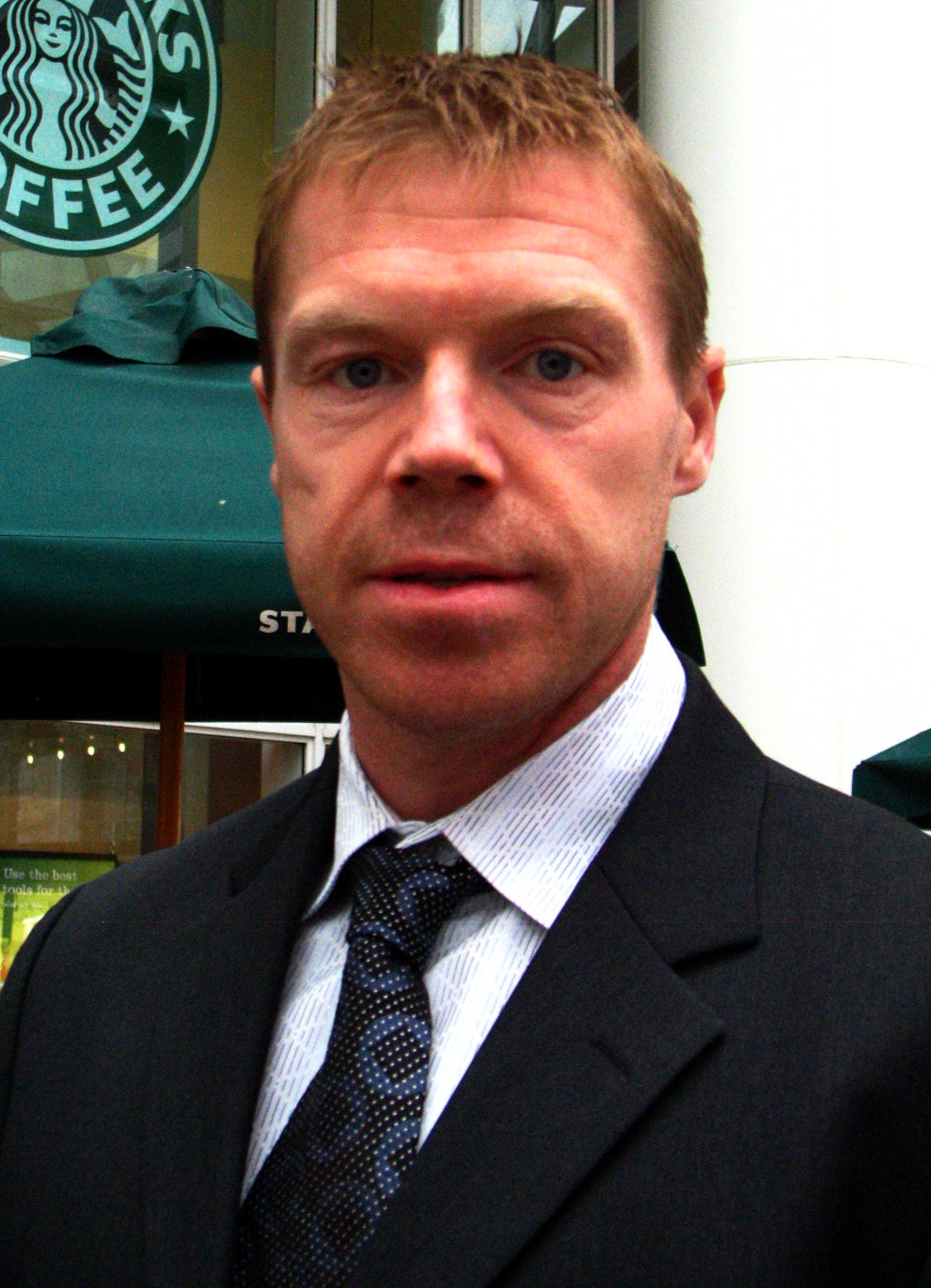
- Draper in 2007
- Born: May 24, 1971 (age 55) Toronto, Ontario, Canada
- Height: 5 ft 10 in (178 cm)
- Weight: 188 lb (85 kg; 13 st 6 lb)
- Position: Centre
- Shot: Left
- Played for: Winnipeg Jets; Detroit Red Wings
- National team: Canada
- NHL draft: 62nd overall, 1989; Winnipeg Jets
- Playing career: 1989–2011

Kristopher Bruce "Kris" Draper (born May 24, 1971) is a Canadian former professional ice hockey player and current director of amateur scouting and assistant general manager for the Detroit Red Wings, the team which he played 17 seasons for during his 20-year National Hockey League (NHL) playing career.

Draper is a four-time Stanley Cup champion (all with Detroit), a Frank J. Selke Trophy winner and has scored over 100 goals in his NHL career with the Red Wings. Draper was a member of the famous "Grind Line" in Detroit, consisting of himself, Kirk Maltby and either Joe Kocur or Darren McCarty. His 222 playoff games ranked him tenth of most career playoff games played.

== Playing career ==
Draper grew up in West Hill, Ontario, a neighbourhood in the east end of Toronto, where he played minor ice hockey for the Don Mills Flyers of the MTHL. He played in the 1983 Quebec International Pee-Wee Hockey Tournament with the Don Mills team, and in the 1984 tournament with the Toronto Young Nationals.

After attending De La Salle College in Toronto, he was selected by the Ontario Hockey League (OHL)'s Windsor Spitfires in the fourth round of the 1988 OHL Priority Selection. Instead of reporting to Windsor, Draper elected to play for Team Canada.

Drafted 62nd overall in the 1989 NHL entry draft by the original Winnipeg Jets, Draper did not see much NHL action in his early years. He is a rarity in that he played in the American Hockey League (AHL) and NHL before playing junior in the OHL. After playing just 20 NHL games for the Jets in four seasons after being drafted, he was traded to the Detroit Red Wings in 1993 in exchange for $1. Doug MacLean, the general manager of the Adirondack Red Wings at the time and a former Detroit Red Wings assistant, was responsible for the trade. Draper would quickly become a valuable fixture for Detroit, and he began his reputation as the "One Dollar Man," eventually becoming one of only seven players (four others were longtime teammates) to play over 1,000 games in a Red Wings uniform.

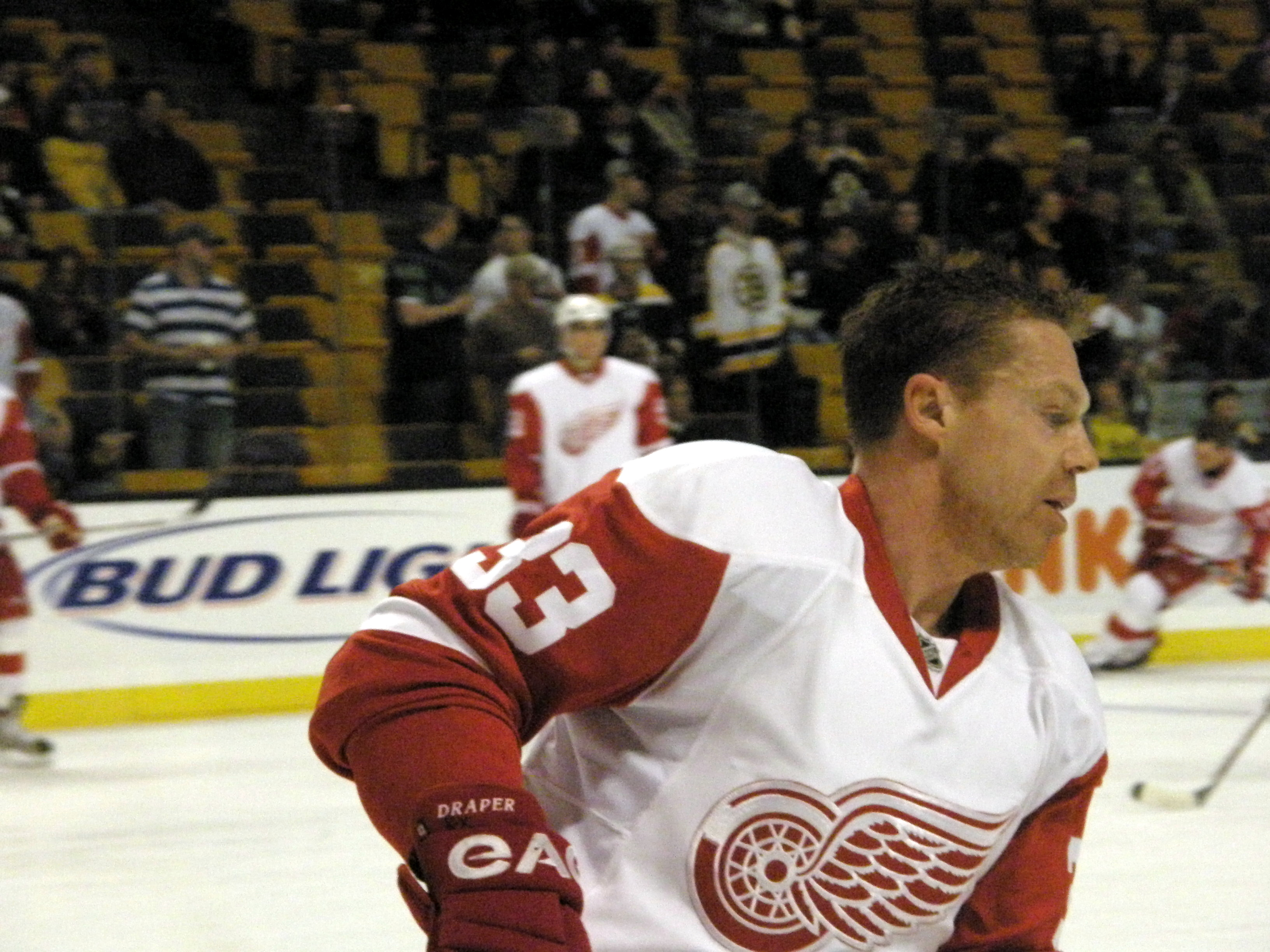
Draper warming up before a 2008 game against the Boston Bruins.

On May 29, 1996, during game six of the Western Conference Finals of the 1996 Stanley Cup playoffs, Draper was checked from behind into the boards at the end of the players bench by Colorado Avalanche player Claude Lemieux. The hit forced Draper face-first into the dasher (the top edge of the boards), causing him to suffer a broken jaw, broken nose, broken cheekbone, and a concussion. After the game, when interviewed about the hit and the handshake line, Draper's teammate Dino Ciccarelli reacted and coldly remarked, "I can't believe I shook this guy's friggin' hand after the game! That pisses me right off!" When the Wings and Avalanche met again on March 26, 1997, play was very physical between the two teams, and the existing animosity over the hit on Draper set off a massive brawl ("Brawl in Hockeytown") between the two teams. According to ESPN’s E60 special “Unrivaled,” Draper has not yet forgiven Lemieux for the hit, nor did Lemieux ever reach out to apologize.

Draper did not have a breakout offensive season until the 2003–04 season, when he scored 24 goals and 40 points, helping Detroit win the Presidents' Trophy as the team with the highest regular season point total. In addition to his offensive contributions, Draper also won the Frank J. Selke Trophy at season's end as the NHL's top defensive forward.

Draper was selected to play for Team Canada at the 2006 Winter Olympics in Turin, Italy. Despite the personal achievement, Canada disappointed in the tournament, losing 2–0 to Russia in the quarter-finals and failing to medal.

During the 2006–07 season, Draper was named an alternate captain of the Red Wings. On October 25, 2007, he signed a three-year, $4.75 million contract extension with the team. He earned $1.85 million in 2008–09, $1.65 million in 2009–10, and $1.25 million in the 2010–11 season, for an annual salary cap hit of $1.58 million.

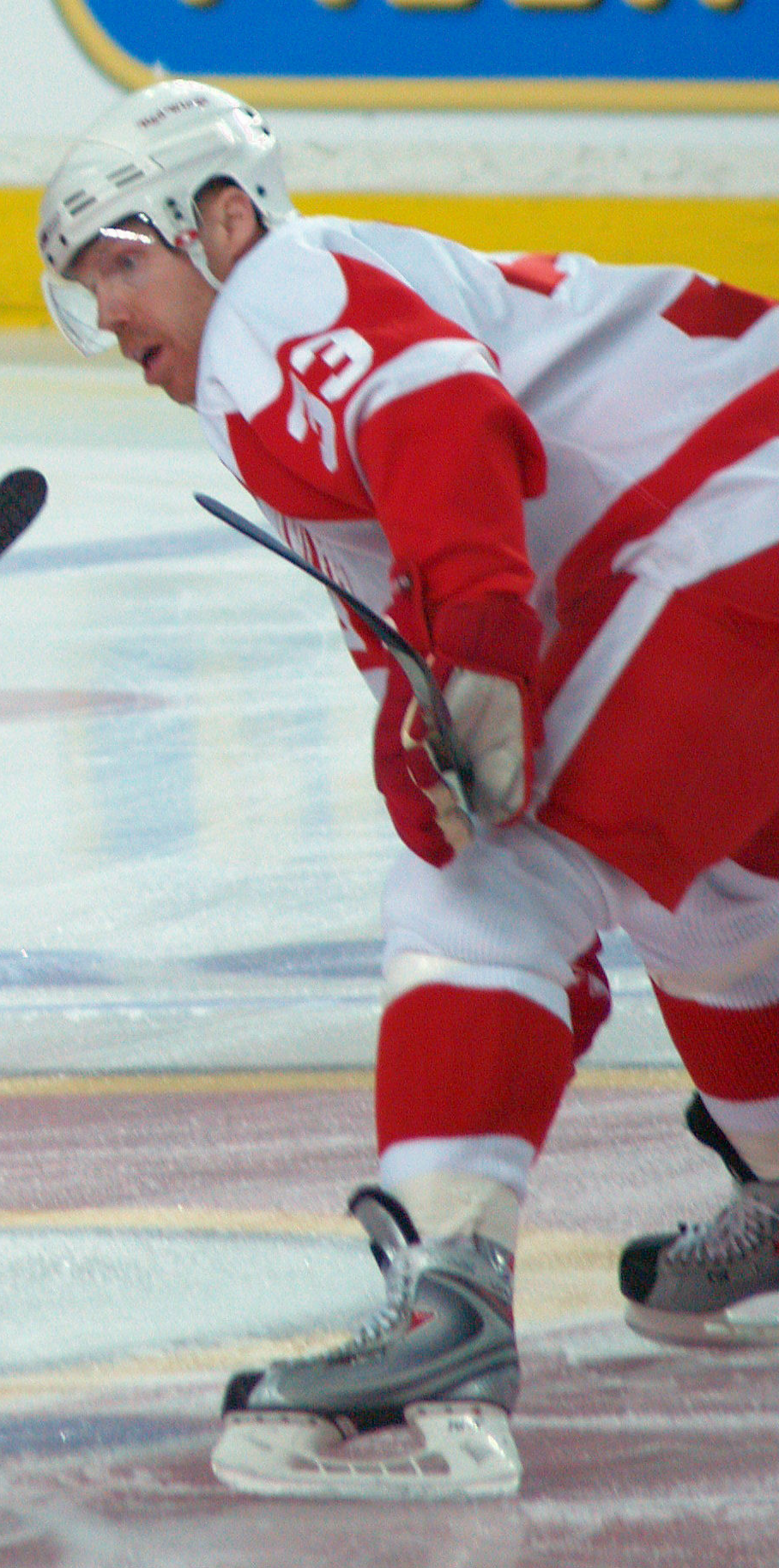
Draper prior to a faceoff against the Calgary Flames.

On March 17, 2009, Draper became the fifth player to play 1,000 games in a Red Wings uniform, a feat accomplished only by Gordie Howe, Alex Delvecchio, Steve Yzerman, Nicklas Lidström, and Tomas Holmström. All of the aforementioned players, except Holmström, are enshrined in the Hockey Hall of Fame, and all have had their numbers retired by the Red Wings, except Holmström. In Draper's case, his 1,000th game in a Red Wings uniform was his 1,020th NHL game overall (passing the 1,000 NHL game milestone on February 2, 2009).

Draper, discussing his accomplishment, said:

"Anytime you can join a group like that or there's a sentence and Draper slides in with them, it's a huge honor. I know I've been fortunate. I've been able to stay relatively healthy throughout my career and just been given a tremendous opportunity to remain a Red Wing as long as I have. A thousand games in a Red Wings uniform is something that I'm really proud of. I never imagined we'd be sitting here talking about something like that."

On July 25, 2011, the Detroit Red Wings prematurely announced the retirement of Draper, which was to be formally announced the next day at a press conference in Detroit at Joe Louis Arena. The news of the retirement was leaked through a photo album the organization posted on their official website. The album, titled "Kris Draper in Photographs," contained 71 pictures. The 68th picture was accompanied by a caption that read, "After 1,157 games and four Stanley Cup championships, Kris Draper announced his retirement during a press conference on July 26, 2011." It was reported that Draper desired to play another season; however, the team did not have a roster spot for him, and he refused to sign a two-way deal or attend training camp to try out for a roster spot. Draper retired on July 26, 2011.

Draper returned to the ice on December 31, 2016, playing for the Red Wings in their Centennial Classic alumni game against the Toronto Maple Leafs. During the game, Draper was involved in a physical exchange with Gary Roberts, an uncommon occurrence in alumni games.

== Post-playing career ==
Immediately following Draper's retirement from hockey, he was added to the Red Wings' front office staff as the special assistant to the general manager, Ken Holland. In this position, Draper "work[s] closely with Detroit’s management team, assisting in player evaluation at both the professional and amateur levels. He will be asked to provide input regarding potential trades and free agent signings, as well as providing insight into potential selections at the annual NHL Entry Draft."

On July 11, 2019, Draper was promoted to director of amateur scouting by new general manager and former teammate Steve Yzerman, following the departure of Tyler Wright to Edmonton. On July 5, 2023, he was promoted to assistant general manager for the Red Wings.

== Personal life ==
Draper and his wife, Julie, have two daughters, Kennedi and Kamryn, and a son, Kienan. Kienan was drafted by the Saginaw Spirit in the eighth round of the 2018 Ontario Hockey League (OHL) draft. He played for the Chilliwack Chiefs of the British Columbia Hockey League during the 2020–2021 season, and currently plays for the Michigan Wolverines. Kienan was drafted in the seventh round, 187th overall, by the Detroit Red Wings in the 2020 NHL entry draft. Draper also plays competitive pickleball including Grand Rapid's Beer City Open.

== International play ==
Medal record

Representing Canada

Men's ice hockey

World Championships
Gold medal – first place	2003 Finland	
Silver medal – second place	2005 Austria	

World Cup of Hockey
Gold medal – first place	2004 Canada	

World Junior Championships
Gold medal – first place	1991 Canada	
Gold medal – first place	1990 Finland	

Draper participated in eight international tournaments for Canada:

- 1990 World Junior Ice Hockey Championships
- 1991 World Junior Ice Hockey Championships
- 2000 IIHF World Championship
- 2001 IIHF World Championship
- 2003 IIHF World Championship
- 2004 World Cup of Hockey
- 2005 IIHF World Championship
- 2006 Winter Olympics

== Career statistics ==
=== Regular season and playoffs ===
			Regular season					Playoffs
Season	Team	League	GP	G	A	Pts	PIM	GP	G	A	Pts	PIM
1987–88	Don Mills Flyers Midget AAA	MTHL	40	35	32	67	46	—	—	—	—	—
1988–89	Canadian National Team	Intl	60	11	15	26	16	—	—	—	—	—
1989–90	Canadian National Team	Intl	62	12	22	34	44	—	—	—	—	—
1990–91	Ottawa 67's	OHL	39	19	42	61	35	17	8	11	19	20
1990–91	Moncton Hawks	AHL	7	2	1	3	2	—	—	—	—	—
1990–91	Winnipeg Jets	NHL	3	1	0	1	5	—	—	—	—	—
1991–92	Moncton Hawks	AHL	61	11	18	29	113	4	0	1	1	6
1991–92	Winnipeg Jets	NHL	10	2	0	2	2	2	0	0	0	0
1992–93	Moncton Hawks	AHL	67	12	23	35	40	5	2	2	4	18
1992–93	Winnipeg Jets	NHL	7	0	0	0	2	—	—	—	—	—
1993–94	Adirondack Red Wings	AHL	46	20	23	43	49	—	—	—	—	—
1993–94	Detroit Red Wings	NHL	39	5	8	13	31	7	2	2	4	4
1994–95	Detroit Red Wings	NHL	36	2	6	8	22	18	4	1	5	12
1995–96	Detroit Red Wings	NHL	52	7	9	16	32	18	4	2	6	18
1996–97	Detroit Red Wings	NHL	76	8	5	13	73	20	2	4	6	12
1997–98	Detroit Red Wings	NHL	64	13	10	23	45	19	1	3	4	12
1998–99	Detroit Red Wings	NHL	80	4	14	18	79	10	0	1	1	6
1999–00	Detroit Red Wings	NHL	51	5	7	12	28	9	2	0	2	6
2000–01	Detroit Red Wings	NHL	75	8	17	25	38	6	0	1	1	2
2001–02	Detroit Red Wings	NHL	82	15	15	30	56	23	2	3	5	20
2002–03	Detroit Red Wings	NHL	82	14	21	35	82	4	0	0	0	4
2003–04	Detroit Red Wings	NHL	67	24	16	40	31	12	1	3	4	6
2005–06	Detroit Red Wings	NHL	80	10	22	32	58	6	0	0	0	6
2006–07	Detroit Red Wings	NHL	81	14	15	29	58	18	2	0	2	24
2007–08	Detroit Red Wings	NHL	65	9	8	17	68	22	3	1	4	10
2008–09	Detroit Red Wings	NHL	79	7	10	17	40	8	1	0	1	0
2009–10	Detroit Red Wings	NHL	81	7	15	22	28	12	0	0	0	16
2010–11	Detroit Red Wings	NHL	47	6	5	11	12	8	0	1	1	2
NHL totals			1,157	161	203	364	790	222	24	22	46	160

=== International ===
Year	Team	Event	Result	GP	G	A	Pts	PIM
1990	Canada	WJC	1st place, gold medalist(s)	7	0	2	2	4
1991	Canada	WJC	1st place, gold medalist(s)	7	1	3	4	0
2000	Canada	WC	4th	3	1	0	1	0
2001	Canada	WC	5th	7	1	2	3	0
2003	Canada	WC	1st place, gold medalist(s)	9	0	3	3	10
2004	Canada	WCH	1st place, gold medalist(s)	5	2	2	4	2
2005	Canada	WC	2nd place, silver medalist(s)	9	0	2	2	6
2006	Canada	OG	7th	6	0	0	0	0
Junior totals				14	1	5	6	4
Senior totals				39	4	9	13	18

== Awards and honours ==
Award	Year
NHL
Stanley Cup	1997, 1998, 2002, 2008
Frank J. Selke Trophy	2004

== See also ==
- List of NHL players with 1,000 games played

Preceded by Jere Lehtinen	Winner of the Frank J. Selke Trophy; 2004	Succeeded by Rod Brind'Amour
