= Grind Line =

Hockey forward line of the Detroit Red Wings

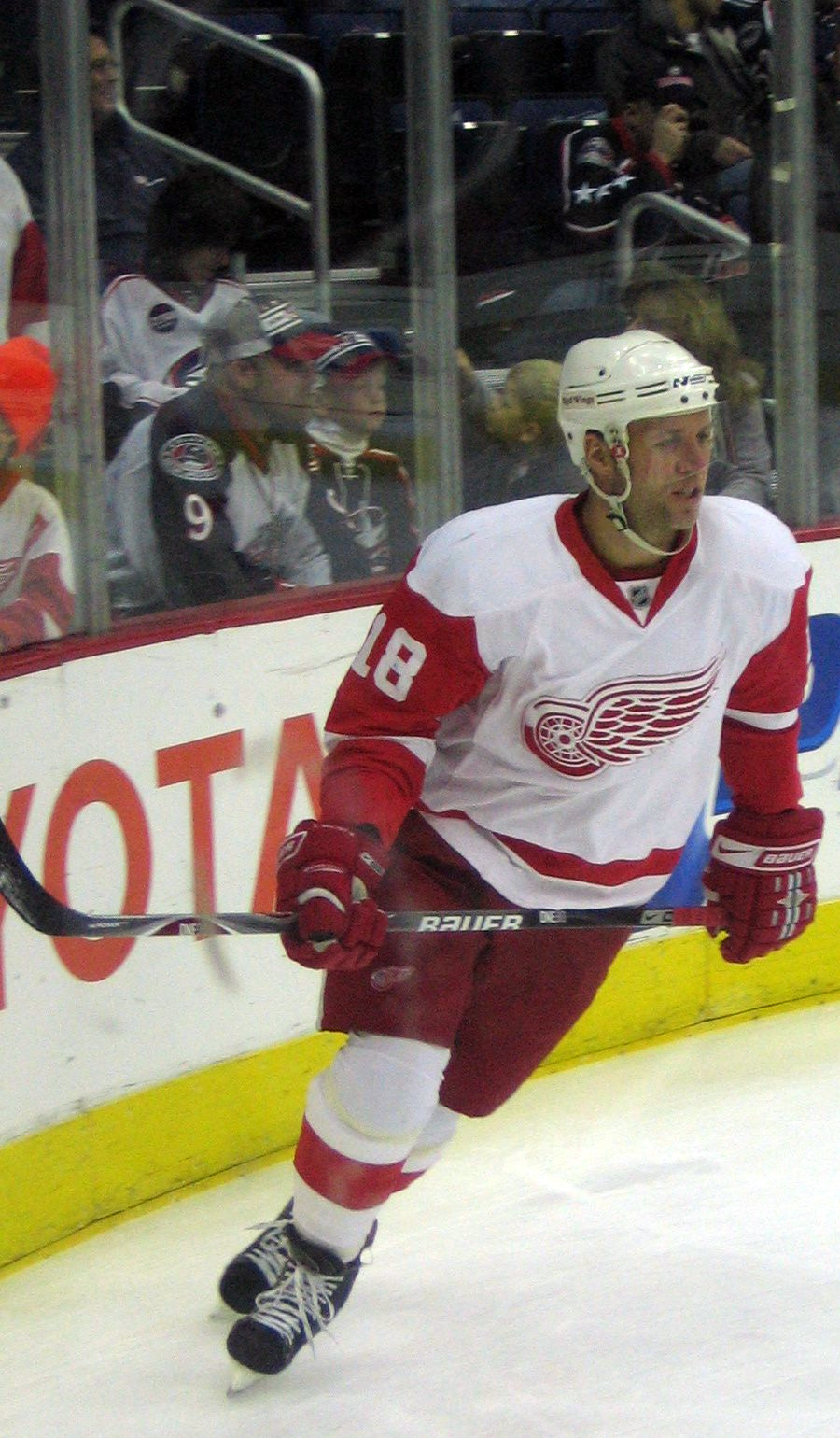
Kirk Maltby, winger on the Grind Line

The Grind Line refers to a former forward line for the National Hockey League's Detroit Red Wings. Red Wings head coach Scotty Bowman modeled it after the Crash Line of the 1995 Stanley Cup champion New Jersey Devils.

== History ==
The original Grind Line in Detroit consisted of Kris Draper, Joe Kocur, and Kirk Maltby, during the Red Wings' heyday in the late-1990s. Draper played the centre position and was known for his speed and ability to win face-offs. Maltby played left-wing and served as a checking forward and agitator in the Wings' left-wing lock defensive scheme. Kocur played right wing and served as a physical presence and team enforcer.

During the 1997 Stanley Cup Finals, the line was effective against the Philadelphia Flyers' "Legion of Doom" line that featured Eric Lindros, John LeClair, and Mikael Renberg. After the 1998 season, Darren McCarty replaced Joe Kocur as the third linemate. The line was effective at "grinding" and wearing down the opposition's top-scoring line by providing an enforcing presence, helping the team win four Stanley Cups.

After the 2004–05 NHL lockout in 2005, McCarty's contract was bought out by the team to make them compliant with the new salary cap. This broke up one of the most famous lines in Detroit Red Wings' history.

In the 2007–2008 season, the Red Wings re-signed McCarty, and after a brief stint with the Grand Rapids Griffins, he rejoined the Detroit Red Wings for the end of the regular season and the playoffs. In his first game back on March 29, 2008, versus the St. Louis Blues, head coach Mike Babcock sent out his starting line of McCarty, Draper, and Maltby, reuniting the "Grind Line".

== See also ==
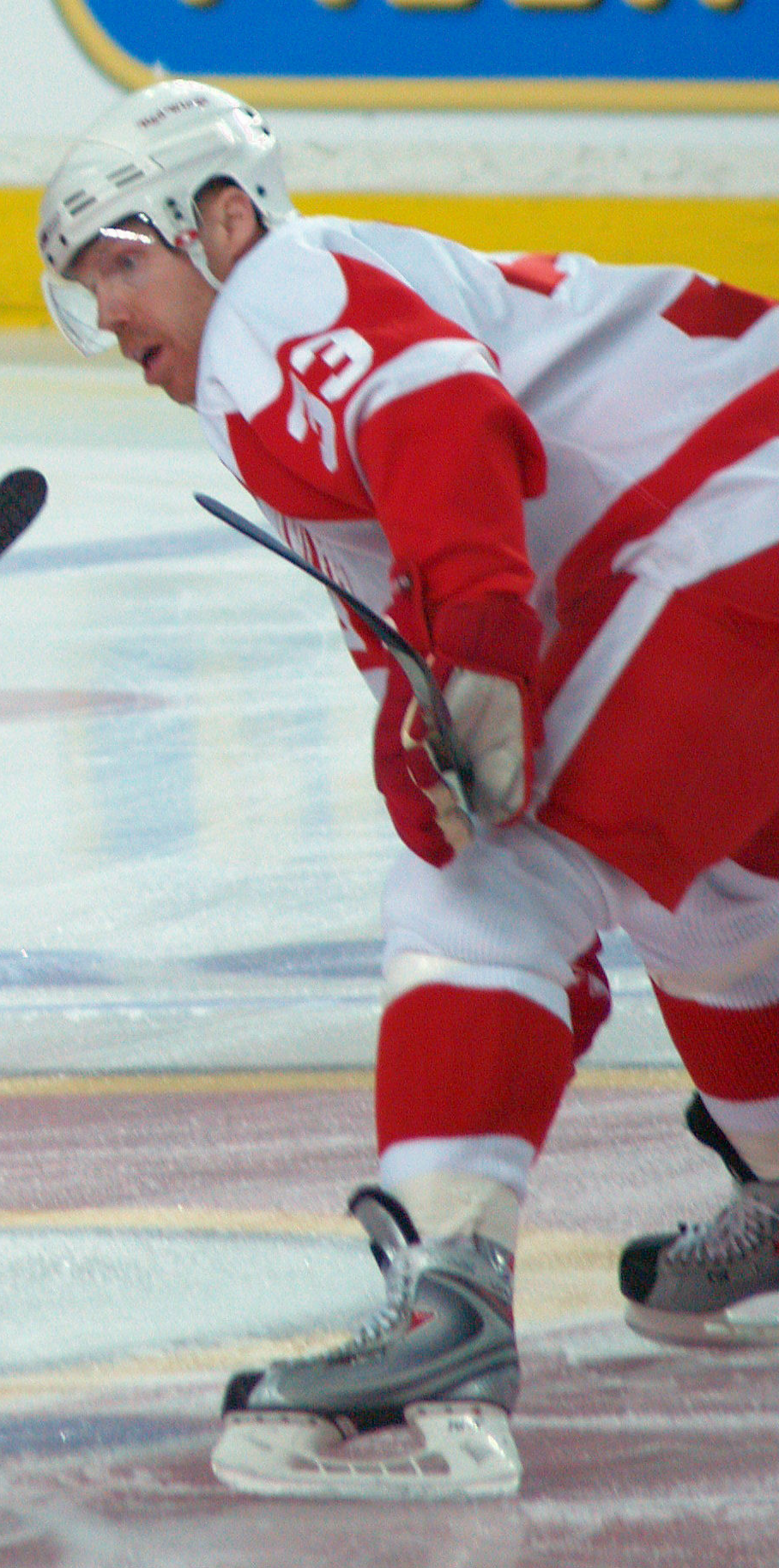
Kris Draper, center on the Grind Line

- List of ice hockey line nicknames
