= Aaron Ward (ice hockey) =

Canadian ice hockey player (born 1973)

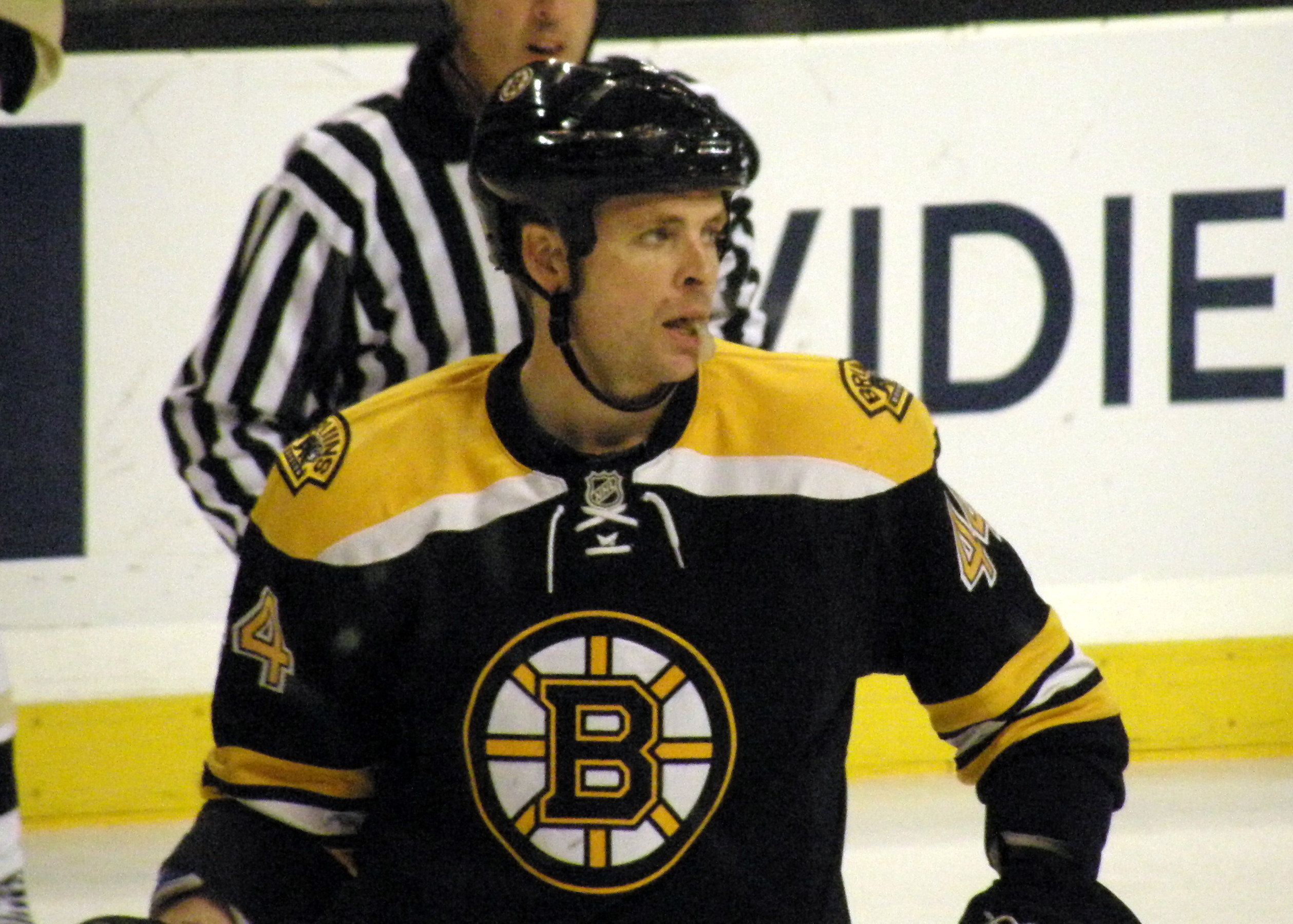
- Ward with the Boston Bruins in 2008
- Born: January 17, 1973 (age 53) Windsor, Ontario, Canada
- Height: 6 ft 2 in (188 cm)
- Weight: 208.2 lb (94 kg; 14 st 12 lb)
- Position: Defence
- Shot: Right
- Played for: Detroit Red Wings; Carolina Hurricanes; ERC Ingolstadt; New York Rangers; Boston Bruins; Anaheim Ducks
- NHL draft: 5th overall, 1991; Winnipeg Jets
- Playing career: 1993–2010

Aaron Christian Ward (born January 17, 1973) is a Canadian former professional ice hockey defenceman who played more than 800 games over a span of 13 seasons in the National Hockey League (NHL) for the Detroit Red Wings, Carolina Hurricanes, New York Rangers, Boston Bruins and Anaheim Ducks. He is a three-time Stanley Cup champion, having won twice with Detroit in 1997 and 1998 and once with Carolina in 2006.

== Playing career ==
Born in Windsor, Ontario, Ward moved with his family to Blackburn Hamlet, Ontario, a suburb of Ottawa, as a youth where he attended Emily Carr Middle School. He played in the 1987 Quebec International Pee-Wee Hockey Tournament with a minor ice hockey team from Gloucester, Ontario.

Ward played junior hockey for the Nepean Raiders of the Central Junior A Hockey League before accepting a scholarship to attend the University of Michigan. After one season playing for the Wolverines ice hockey team, he was drafted fifth overall by the Winnipeg Jets in the 1991 NHL entry draft.

Before his playing days at Michigan were over, he was traded to the Detroit Red Wings, signing with the club in 1993. He was then assigned to the Red Wings' affiliate Adirondack Red Wings for the 1993–94 season, where he spent the bulk of the next three seasons. He later made his NHL debut in 1993–94 and scored his first career NHL goal at the Arrowhead Pond on October 8, 1993. Ward became a regular NHLer during the 1996–97 season.

Ward has played over 600 career NHL games and been a member of three Stanley Cup championship teams, two while playing for the Red Wings in 1997, 1998 and one with the Carolina Hurricanes in 2006. In 2006, Ward scored the first goal in game seven of the Stanley Cup Final to help his team win the Cup. After the 2006 season, Ward became an unrestricted free agent, whereupon he signed with the New York Rangers, joining fellow free agent and 2006 Cup-winning teammate Matt Cullen in New York. Ward's tenure as a Ranger, however, was short-lived, as during the 2006–07 season, among rumours of tension between him and then-Rangers captain Jaromír Jágr, Ward found himself traded to the Boston Bruins in exchange for defenceman Paul Mara. With Boston, Ward added solid defence and much-needed veteran leadership to the team, and was often paired with Zdeno Chára on Boston's top defensive line.

Prior to the 2009–10 season, on July 24, 2009, Ward was re-acquired by Carolina in exchange for forward Patrick Eaves and a fourth-round draft pick in 2010. Ward struggled in his return with the Hurricanes, however, and on March 3, 2010, he was traded to the Anaheim Ducks in exchange for goaltender Justin Pogge and a fourth-round draft pick. During the subsequent off-season, on August 24, Ward announced his retirement from professional hockey after 13 NHL seasons.

== Broadcasting career ==
In the spring of 2007 and 2010, Ward was the NHL on Versus analyst for the Stanley Cup playoffs and since then joined the Big Ten Network as the hockey analyst. Ward previously worked as a hockey analyst on TSN Hockey until 2015. In April 2019, he was hired by a local ABC affiliate station as an analyst to cover the Hurricanes' playoff run.

== Personal life ==
In March 2008, Ward, in conjunction with the Toucher and Rich radio program (WBCN 104.1) created a head-shaving charity event called 'Cuts for a Cause'. Seven players from the Boston Bruins shaved their heads to raise money to benefit the MassGeneral Hospital for Children. Patrice Bergeron, Phil Kessel, Andrew Alberts, Milan Lucic, Mark Stuart and Dennis Wideman joined Ward in helping raise $25,000. A second 'Cuts for a Cause' event took place in April 2009 with the group raising $32,000 for the Boston Bruins Foundation and MassGeneral Hospital for Children's Pediatric Oncology Unit.

On October 9, 2015, Ward was arrested at his home in Cary, North Carolina and charged with assault on a female and interfering with emergency communication. According to the warrant, he and his wife had an argument during which he took away his wife's phone. This incident led to his indefinite suspension from his job as an analyst on TSN Hockey. The charges were dismissed and the record expunged by the Wake County District Attorney's Office in February 2016, stating that “After review of this case and discussions with the victim, it appears that further prosecution is not warranted.”

== Career statistics ==
			Regular season					Playoffs
Season	Team	League	GP	G	A	Pts	PIM	GP	G	A	Pts	PIM
1988–89	Nepean Raiders	CJHL	54	1	14	15	40	—	—	—	—	—
1989–90	Nepean Raiders	CJHL	52	6	33	39	85	—	—	—	—	—
1990–91	University of Michigan	CCHA	46	8	11	19	126	—	—	—	—	—
1991–92	University of Michigan	CCHA	42	7	12	19	64	—	—	—	—	—
1992–93	University of Michigan	CCHA	30	5	8	13	73	—	—	—	—	—
1992–93	Canada	Intl	4	0	0	0	8	—	—	—	—	—
1993–94	Adirondack Red Wings	AHL	58	4	12	16	87	9	2	6	8	6
1993–94	Detroit Red Wings	NHL	5	1	0	1	4	—	—	—	—	—
1994–95	Adirondack Red Wings	AHL	76	11	24	35	87	4	0	1	1	0
1994–95	Detroit Red Wings	NHL	1	0	1	1	2	—	—	—	—	—
1995–96	Adirondack Red Wings	AHL	74	5	10	15	133	3	0	0	0	6
1996–97	Detroit Red Wings	NHL	49	2	5	7	52	19	0	0	0	17
1997–98	Detroit Red Wings	NHL	52	5	5	10	47	—	—	—	—	—
1998–99	Detroit Red Wings	NHL	60	3	8	11	52	8	0	1	1	8
1999–2000	Detroit Red Wings	NHL	36	1	3	4	24	3	0	0	0	0
2000–01	Detroit Red Wings	NHL	73	4	5	9	57	—	—	—	—	—
2001–02	Carolina Hurricanes	NHL	79	3	11	14	74	23	1	1	2	22
2002–03	Carolina Hurricanes	NHL	77	3	6	9	90	—	—	—	—	—
2003–04	Carolina Hurricanes	NHL	49	3	5	8	37	—	—	—	—	—
2004–05	ERC Ingolstadt	DEL	8	0	3	3	16	11	1	1	2	16
2005–06	Carolina Hurricanes	NHL	71	6	19	25	62	25	2	3	5	18
2006–07	New York Rangers	NHL	60	3	10	13	57	—	—	—	—	—
2006–07	Boston Bruins	NHL	20	1	2	3	18	—	—	—	—	—
2007–08	Boston Bruins	NHL	65	5	8	13	54	6	0	1	1	6
2008–09	Boston Bruins	NHL	65	3	7	10	44	11	1	0	1	2
2009–10	Carolina Hurricanes	NHL	60	1	10	11	54	—	—	—	—	—
2009–10	Anaheim Ducks	NHL	17	0	2	2	8	—	—	—	—	—
NHL totals			839	44	107	151	736	95	4	6	10	73

== Awards and honours ==
Award	Year
College
All-CCHA Rookie Team	1990–91
CCHA All-Tournament Team	1991
NHL
Stanley Cup (Detroit Red Wings)	1997, 1998
Stanley Cup (Carolina Hurricanes)	2006

== Trades and transactions ==
- June 9, 1991, Drafted by the Winnipeg Jets in the first round (fifth overall) in 1991.
- June 11, 1993, Traded by the Winnipeg Jets along with a fourth-round selection to the Detroit Red Wings for Paul Ysebaert.
- July 9, 2001, Traded by the Detroit Red Wings to the Carolina Hurricanes for a future second-round selection.
- July 3, 2006, Signed with the New York Rangers as a free agent.
- February 27, 2007, Traded by the New York Rangers to the Boston Bruins for Paul Mara.
- May 22, 2008, Signed a two-year contract with the Boston Bruins.
- July 24, 2009, Traded by the Boston Bruins to the Carolina Hurricanes for winger Patrick Eaves and a fourth-round pick in the 2010 draft.
- December 14, 2009, waived by the Carolina Hurricanes.
- March 3, 2010, traded by the Carolina Hurricanes to the Anaheim Ducks for Justin Pogge and a 2010 fourth-round pick.

Sporting positions
Preceded by Keith Tkachuk	Winnipeg Jets first-round draft pick 1991	Succeeded by Sergei Bautin
