= Darren McCarty =

Canadian ice hockey player (born 1972)

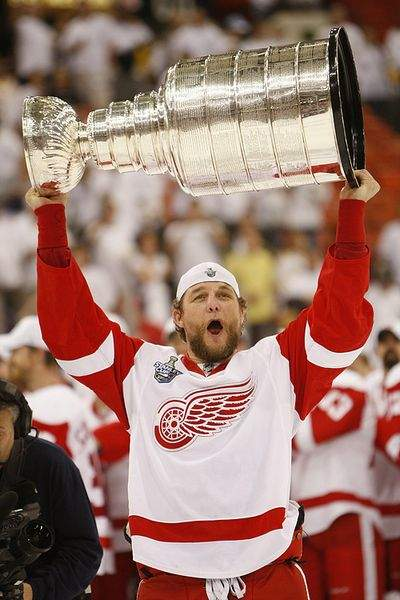
- McCarty with the Stanley Cup in 2008
- Born: April 1, 1972 (age 54) Burnaby, British Columbia, Canada
- Height: 6 ft 1 in (185 cm)
- Weight: 219 lb (99 kg; 15 st 9 lb)
- Position: Right Wing
- Shot: Right
- Played for: Detroit Red Wings; Calgary Flames
- NHL draft: 46th overall, 1992; Detroit Red Wings
- Playing career: 1992–2009

Darren Douglas McCarty (born April 1, 1972) is a Canadian former professional ice hockey forward and professional wrestler, best known for his years playing with the Detroit Red Wings of the National Hockey League (NHL). McCarty has been known for taking on the role of the Red Wings enforcer most of his career, a role in which he played in five Stanley Cup Finals and won the Stanley Cup four times in 1997, 1998, 2002, and 2008, the last of which after resurrecting his career in the Red Wings minor league system.

McCarty spent much of his childhood in the small town of Leamington, Ontario, playing for the Southpoint Capitals (OMHA) minor teams.

== Playing career ==
=== Belleville Bulls ===
McCarty played for the Belleville Bulls of the Ontario Hockey League from 1989 through 1992. As captain of the team during the 1991-92 season, McCarty recorded 55 goals and 72 assists for 127 points in 65 games. He was awarded the Jim Mahon Memorial Trophy as the top scoring right winger.

=== Detroit Red Wings ===
Drafted by the Red Wings in the 1992 NHL entry draft in the 2nd round, 49th overall, McCarty scored 26 points in his rookie season to help the team win the Central Division title. The Red Wings managed to make it to the 1995 Stanley Cup Final in his second season, McCarty's first overall, against the New Jersey Devils, where the team and the hockey world were stunned to be swept.

During the 1996–97 NHL season, arguably McCarty's most eventful, he managed to score a career-best 19 goals and 42 points. One of McCarty's most infamous moments, or 'famous moment' for Red Wings fans at least, was in the famous "Fight Night at the Joe" on March 26, 1997, where a massive brawl broke out between the Colorado Avalanche and Red Wings. McCarty stunned Avalanche right winger Claude Lemieux with a blistering punch and continued punching Lemieux while Lemieux "turtled" his body to avoid damage. The fight was revenge for a hit that Lemieux inflicted on Kris Draper in the previous years playoffs, that caused significant injuries to Draper, and which also happened in front of McCarty while he was sitting on the bench. McCarty, who managed to stay in the game, ended his eventful night with scoring the overtime goal against Patrick Roy. The fight was considered what brought the team together in time for the playoffs, and helped break the Stanley Cup drought curse over the franchise. The Red Wings managed to make it back to the Cup Final, McCarty's second Final appearance, and the Red Wings swept the Philadelphia Flyers for their first Stanley Cup in 42 years. In game two, McCarty knocked out Flyers defensemen Paul Coffey with a clean check; Coffey (who had played for the Red Wings for three and a half seasons before being banished by Scotty Bowman) suffered a concussion and didn't return for the rest of the series. In game four, McCarty scored the most famous goal of his career, some comparing the move with a Mario Lemieux play, which also turned out to be the game winning and Cup-clinching goal, on Ron Hextall.

The next season, the team made it back the Stanley Cup Final, its second consecutive appearance, and McCarty's third overall, against the Washington Capitals, managing to sweep them as well for their second consecutive, and McCarty's second, Stanley Cup. This season was primarily dedicated to former Red Wings defenceman Vladimir Konstantinov, who, mere days after winning the Cup the previous year, suffered career ending and life altering injuries in a limousine accident.

From the 1997–98 season until his departure from the Red Wings in 2005, but following his return in 2008, McCarty was part of Detroit's famous Grind Line with center Kris Draper and winger Kirk Maltby, which was often matched up against the opponent's top offensive line.

In the 2002 Stanley Cup Playoffs, McCarty registered his first hat-trick in Game One of the Western Conference Final against the Colorado Avalanche's Patrick Roy. McCarty scored four goals in the series, a career best. Meeting the Carolina Hurricanes in the 2002 Stanley Cup Final, McCarty's fourth final appearance overall, Detroit won the series and their third Stanley Cup in six years, making it McCarty's third Stanley Cup championship.

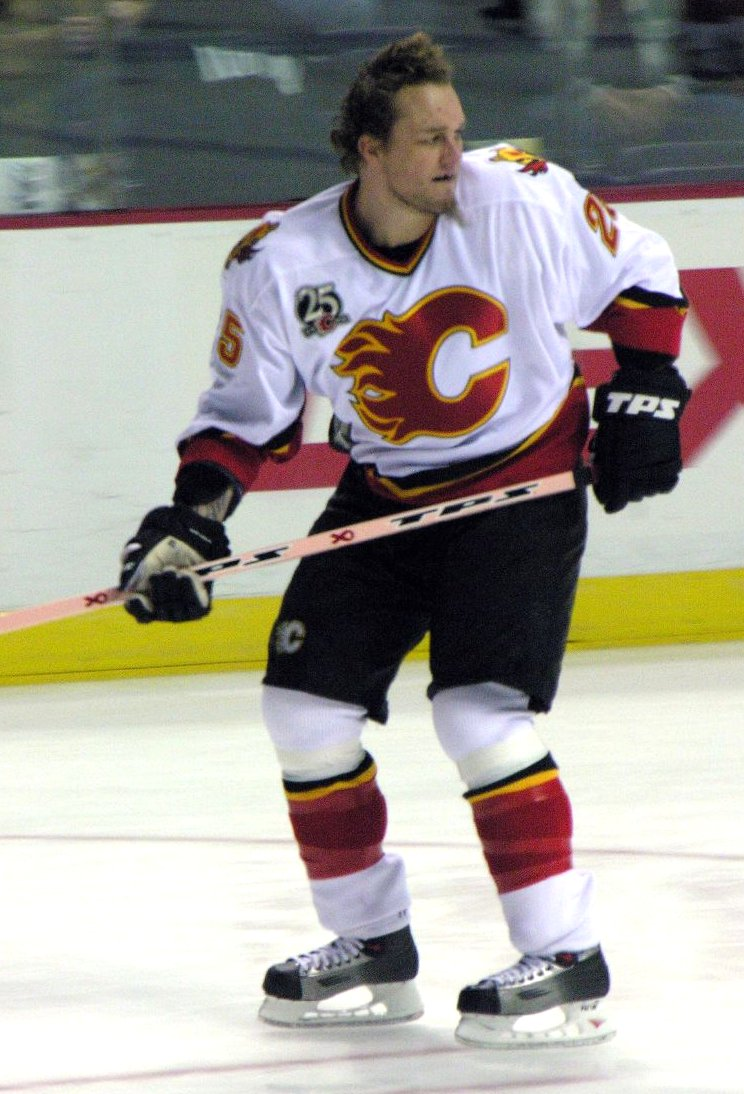
McCarty with the Flames in March 2006

=== Calgary Flames ===
After 11 seasons with the Red Wings, McCarty and the team parted ways as the lockout cancelled the 2004–05 NHL season. McCarty's contract was bought out by the Red Wings as a result of the newly implemented salary cap. He then signed as a free agent with the Calgary Flames on August 2, 2005. He scored seven goals for the Flames during the regular season. He scored the overtime winning goal in game one of the Flames first round series against the Mighty Ducks of Anaheim, a series Calgary would eventually lose in seven games. In the 2006–07 season, McCarty appeared in only 32 games and for the first time in his career, failed to register a point.

=== Flint Generals ===
On December 31, 2007, the Flint Generals of the International Hockey League announced that McCarty had signed with the team. The Generals are co-owned by McCarty's former Grind Line linemate Kris Draper, who encouraged McCarty to make a comeback to professional hockey after his career seemed over after falling into alcohol. McCarty made his home debut for the Generals on January 12, 2008, and recorded one assist in the 4–3 victory. In ten games with the Generals, McCarty had three goals, two assists, and thirty penalty minutes.

=== Grand Rapids Griffins and return to the Red Wings ===
On January 30, 2008, The Grand Rapids Press reported that McCarty would sign a professional tryout contract with the Grand Rapids Griffins. On February 4, 2008, this was made official. On his Griffins debut at Van Andel Arena, he tallied a hat trick and added an assist to power Grand Rapids to a 6–3 win over the Lake Erie Monsters.

On February 25, McCarty signed a one-year contract with the Red Wings and was called up on March 7. Facing Nashville in the opening round of the 2008 playoffs, McCarty scored the opening goal in Game Two, a 4-2 Detroit win. Making the 2008 Stanley Cup Final with the team against the Pittsburgh Penguins, the Red Wings eventually won the Stanley Cup in six games, which was McCarty's fifth Finals appearance overall, and his fourth championship all together. This made him, along with teammates Nicklas Lidstrom, Tomas Holmstrom, Kris Draper, and Kirk Maltby the only five players who won all four championships the franchise achieved between 1997 and 2008. McCarty was re-signed to a one-year contract with the Red Wings in the offseason.

Playing just 13 games in the 2008-09 season, he scored his first regular season goal since his comeback but which also turned out to be the last of his career at home against Pittsburgh Penguins goaltender Marc-Andre Fleury on November 11, 2008, and racked up 25 penalty minutes. On November 18, the Red Wings placed McCarty on waivers, knowing he would not be claimed. McCarty cleared waivers and remained with the team. After being sent to the Griffins for just one game, McCarty was recalled. McCarty later suffered a groin strain, which landed him on injured reserve in late November. On February 24, 2009, the Detroit Red Wings reassigned McCarty to the Griffins after being activated from the injured reserve list. There, he played in 19 games for the Griffins, scoring 5 goals and 6 assists while also collecting 21 penalty minutes. During the Griffins' playoff run, McCarty scored 3 goals, 1 assist, and 8 penalty minutes in 10 games. After the Griffins were eliminated in the playoffs by the Manitoba Moose, McCarty was recalled by the Red Wings along with several other Griffins players on May 10.

On July 1, 2009, McCarty became an unrestricted free agent. One week later, Red Wings' general manager Ken Holland stated that the team would likely move on from McCarty in order to help promote and give more ice time to their rookies and prospects.

== Retirement ==
On December 7, 2009, McCarty officially retired and had already accepted a job as a color analyst for Versus. A fifteen-season veteran and fan favorite in Detroit, McCarty thanked the Red Wings and Flames organizations as well as the fans for helping him to realize his dream.

== Broadcasting ==
On November 23, 2009, McCarty made his debut as an NHL Analyst for Versus. McCarty made occasional appearances on the Versus post game show, Hockey Central. McCarty served as a fill-in co-host on WXYT-FM (97.1 The Ticket) in Detroit.

McCarty appeared on the January 24, 2012 episode of the truTV reality series Hardcore Pawn, where he appeared with a friend who was trying to sell an alligator hide. Later, American Jewelry and Loan owners Les and Seth Gold and truTV hired McCarty to do some cameo appearances on the show.

McCarty started his weekly podcast, Grind Time with Darren McCarty, in December 2018. He broadcast weekly from Radio for One Studios featuring guests to discuss topics ranging from hockey to music to life's journey to legalization of cannabis. The "Grind Time with Darren McCarty" team consists of his co-host Perry Vellucci and executive producer / business manager, Nick Antonucci, which has joined Woodward Sports Network in Birmingham, MI as of January 2021.

== Professional wrestling career ==
McCarty now occasionally appears and wrestles for pro wrestling company ICW No Holds Barred. He was brought in to feud with wrestlers Brandon Kirk and Kasey Kirk.

On March 24, 2023, he was a guest at IMPACT Wrestling's monthly special Sacrifice. After being confronted by Bully Ray, it led to a fight in the ring between the two. The Good Hands (John Skyler and Jason Hoch) and Bully Ray triple powerbombed McCarty through a table. He returned to IMPACT to team with Tommy Dreamer and Yuya Uemura in a six-man tag team match against Bully Ray and the Good Hands on a post-Sactifice edition of IMPACT. The April 6 edition of IMPACT saw McCarty, Dreamer, and Uemura get the win with McCarty getting the pinfall. On the June 29 edition of IMPACT, it was announced that McCarty would be returning at the Slammiversary pay-per-view (PPV). He was announced as the special guest enforcer for Bully Ray and Steve Maclin vs. PCO and Scott D'Amore tag team match.

== Personal life ==
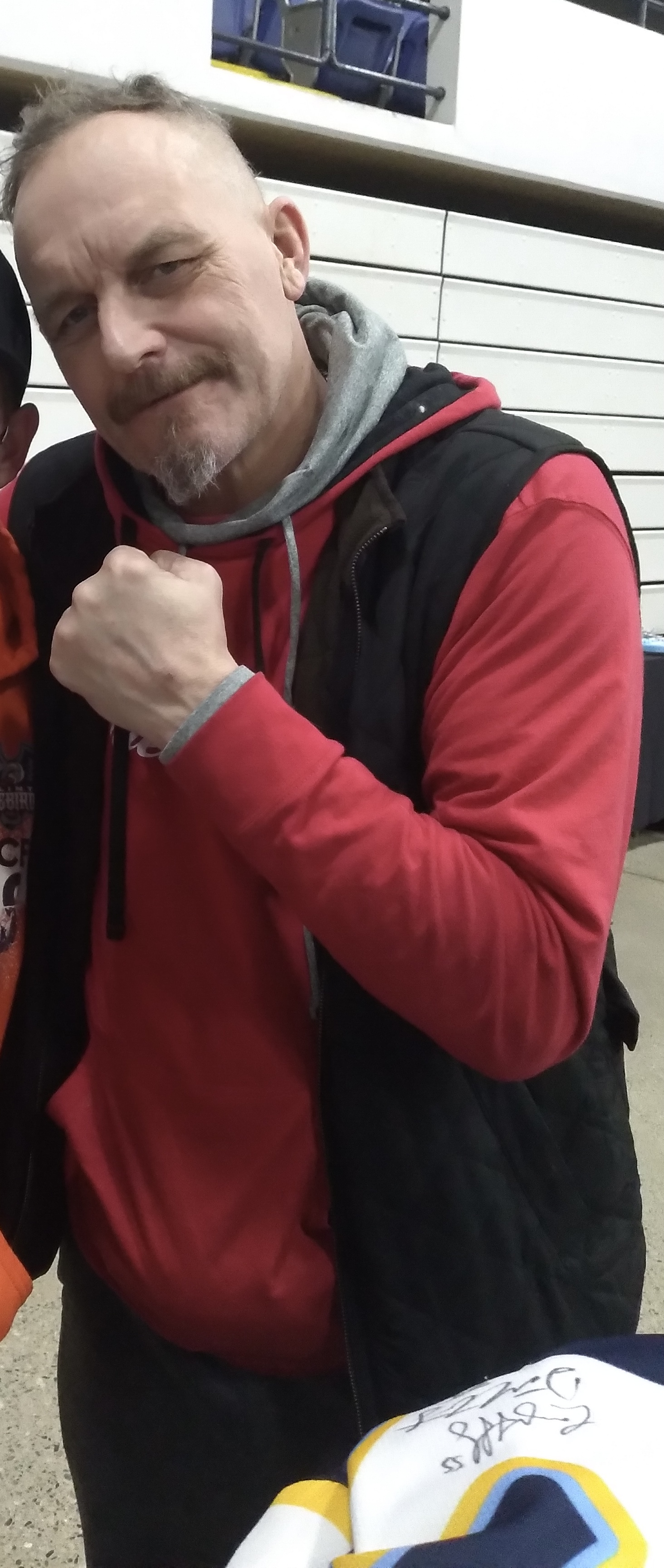

McCarty's father, Craig, was diagnosed with multiple myeloma, an incurable cancer of the bone marrow and blood, in 1995. In 1997, Darren McCarty established the McCarty Cancer Foundation to raise funds to finance research for a cure of this type of cancer.

During the early 2000s he was part of an investigative journalism piece for Rob Wolchek of WJBK-TV Fox 2 News in Detroit, Michigan, in which a self-proclaimed masseuse fabricated family ties to McCarty in an attempt to further garner clientele from the local area while practicing without any certifications.

During the offseason, McCarty is the lead singer for the hard rock band "Grinder," which has been in hiatus with the sudden passing of their bass player and friend, James B. Anders from cardiomyopathy.

McCarty appeared on the 2005 ESPN game show Teammates with his teammate on the Red Wings at the time Brendan Shanahan.

McCarty has four kids with first wife, Cheryl: Griffin, Emerson, Avery, and Gracyn.

In 2012, McCarty wed long-time girlfriend Sheryl Sirmons. He lives in Clawson, Michigan.

McCarty's autobiography, 'My Last Fight: The True Story of a Hockey Rock Star', was released on December 1, 2013, by Triumph Books.

McCarty is a proponent for the legalization of cannabis. He credits cannabis with helping him overcome his alcohol addiction.

== Awards ==
- 1992: Ontario Hockey League First All-Star Team
- 1992: Jim Mahon Memorial Trophy
- 1997, 1998, 2002, 2008: Won the Stanley Cup with the Red Wings
- 1998: ESPY Award NHL Play of the Year
- 2003 Named the winner of the NHL Foundation Player Award

== Career statistics ==
			Regular season					Playoffs
Season	Team	League	GP	G	A	Pts	PIM	GP	G	A	Pts	PIM
1988–89	Peterborough Roadrunners	MetJHL	33	11	14	25	103	—	—	—	—	—
1989–90	Belleville Bulls	OHL	63	12	15	27	142	11	1	1	2	21
1990–91	Belleville Bulls	OHL	60	30	37	67	151	6	2	2	4	13
1991–92	Belleville Bulls	OHL	65	55	72	127	177	5	1	4	5	13
1992–93	Adirondack Red Wings	AHL	73	17	19	36	278	11	0	1	1	33
1993–94	Detroit Red Wings	NHL	67	9	17	26	181	7	2	2	4	8
1994–95	Detroit Red Wings	NHL	31	5	8	13	88	18	3	2	5	14
1995–96	Detroit Red Wings	NHL	63	15	14	29	158	19	3	2	5	20
1996–97	Detroit Red Wings	NHL	68	19	30	49	126	20	3	4	7	34
1997–98	Detroit Red Wings	NHL	71	15	22	37	157	22	3	8	11	34
1998–99	Detroit Red Wings	NHL	69	14	26	40	108	10	1	1	2	23
1999–2000	Detroit Red Wings	NHL	24	6	6	12	48	9	0	1	1	12
2000–01	Detroit Red Wings	NHL	72	12	10	22	123	6	1	0	1	2
2001–02	Detroit Red Wings	NHL	62	5	7	12	98	23	4	4	8	34
2002–03	Detroit Red Wings	NHL	73	13	9	22	138	4	0	0	0	6
2003–04	Detroit Red Wings	NHL	43	6	5	11	50	12	0	1	1	7
2005–06	Calgary Flames	NHL	67	7	6	13	117	7	2	0	2	15
2006–07	Calgary Flames	NHL	32	0	0	0	58	—	—	—	—	—
2007–08	Flint Generals	IHL	11	3	3	6	30	—	—	—	—	—
2007–08	Grand Rapids Griffins	AHL	13	5	5	10	21	—	—	—	—	—
2007–08	Detroit Red Wings	NHL	3	0	1	1	2	17	1	1	2	19
2008–09	Grand Rapids Griffins	AHL	19	5	6	11	21	10	3	1	4	8
2008–09	Detroit Red Wings	NHL	13	1	0	1	25	—	—	—	—	—
NHL totals			758	127	161	288	1477	174	23	26	49	228
