= Mathieu Dandenault =

Canadian ice hockey player (born 1976)

- Born: February 3, 1976 (age 50) Sherbrooke, Quebec, Canada
- Height: 6 ft 0 in (183 cm)
- Weight: 208 lb (94 kg; 14 st 12 lb)
- Position: Defence
- Shot: Right
- Played for: Detroit Red Wings; Montreal Canadiens
- National team: Canada
- NHL draft: 49th overall, 1994; Detroit Red Wings
- Playing career: 1995–2010

Mathieu Alexandre Dandenault (born February 3, 1976) is a Canadian former professional ice hockey defenceman. He played for the Detroit Red Wings and the Montreal Canadiens in the National Hockey League (NHL).

He was a member of the 1997, 1998, and 2002 Stanley Cup winning teams with the Red Wings.

== Playing career ==
Dandenault was originally drafted as a right wing, but was converted into a defenceman during the 2001–02 season. After nine seasons with the Red Wings, who drafted him forty-ninth overall in the second round of the 1994 amateur draft, he played for HC Asiago in Italy in 2004–05 (due to the lockout) and upon his return to North America, he signed a 4-year contract with the Canadiens, his hometown team.

He has won the Stanley Cup three times (1997, 1998 and 2002), all with the Detroit Red Wings.

A free agent before the 2009–10 season, Dandenault was invited to the San Jose Sharks training camp. However, Dandenault was among the final cuts as the Sharks decided to release him on September 27, 2009. On October 21, 2009, the Hartford Wolf Pack, American Hockey League affiliate of the New York Rangers, signed Dandeneault to a Professional Tryout Agreement. On March 4, 2010, the Hartford Wolfpack released Dandenault from his Professional Tryout Agreement.

== Personal life ==
Dandenault grew up in Gloucester, a suburb of Ottawa, Canada. He married Marie-Christine Lavoie in 2003. They were divorced in 2014. Dandenault has one daughter, Amélia. Dandenault has two brothers: Louis-Philippe Dandenault and Alexandre Dandenault

== International play ==
Medal record

Representing Canada

World Championships
Gold medal – first place	2003 Helsinki	

Dandenault represented Canada at the 2003 Men's World Ice Hockey Championships, where he won a gold medal. Dandenault recorded two goals and three assists in nine games.

== Achievements ==
- Won the Stanley Cup in 1997, 1998, and 2002 (Detroit Red Wings)
- Won the 1991 Canadian Tire Cup All-Ontario Bantam AAA Championship as a 15-year-old with the Gloucester Rangers ('75s).

== Career statistics ==
=== Regular season and playoffs ===
			Regular season					Playoffs
Season	Team	League	GP	G	A	Pts	PIM	GP	G	A	Pts	PIM
1991–92	Vanier Voyageurs	EOJHL	33	27	31	58	20	—	—	—	—	—
1991–92	Gloucester Rangers	CJHL	6	3	4	7	0	—	—	—	—	—
1992–93	Gloucester Rangers	CJHL	55	11	26	37	64	—	—	—	—	—
1993–94	Sherbrooke Faucons	QMJHL	67	17	36	53	67	12	4	10	14	12
1994–95	Sherbrooke Faucons	QMJHL	67	37	70	107	76	7	1	7	8	10
1995–96	Sherbrooke Faucons	QMJHL	1	1	2	3	0	—	—	—	—	—
1995–96	Adirondack Red Wings	AHL	4	0	0	0	0	—	—	—	—	—
1995–96	Detroit Red Wings	NHL	34	5	7	12	6	—	—	—	—	—
1996–97	Detroit Red Wings	NHL	65	3	9	12	28	—	—	—	—	—
1997–98	Detroit Red Wings	NHL	68	5	12	17	43	3	1	0	1	0
1998–99	Detroit Red Wings	NHL	75	4	10	14	59	10	0	1	1	0
1999–2000	Detroit Red Wings	NHL	81	6	12	18	20	6	0	0	0	2
2000–01	Detroit Red Wings	NHL	73	10	15	25	38	6	0	1	1	0
2001–02	Detroit Red Wings	NHL	81	8	12	20	44	23	1	2	3	8
2002–03	Detroit Red Wings	NHL	74	4	15	19	64	4	0	0	0	2
2003–04	Detroit Red Wings	NHL	65	3	9	12	40	12	1	1	2	6
2004–05	HC Asiago	ITA	10	0	2	2	2	9	1	5	6	4
2005–06	Montreal Canadiens	NHL	82	5	15	20	83	6	0	3	3	4
2006–07	Montreal Canadiens	NHL	68	2	6	8	40	—	—	—	—	—
2007–08	Montreal Canadiens	NHL	61	9	5	14	34	9	0	0	0	2
2008–09	Montreal Canadiens	NHL	41	4	8	12	17	4	0	0	0	0
2009–10	Hartford Wolf Pack	AHL	19	1	1	2	10	—	—	—	—	—
NHL totals			868	68	135	203	516	83	3	8	11	24

=== International ===
Year	Team	Event	Result	GP	G	A	Pts	PIM
2003	Canada	WC	1st place, gold medalist(s)	9	2	3	5	12
Senior totals				9	2	3	5	12
