= Doug Brown (ice hockey) =

American ice hockey player

- Born: June 12, 1964 (age 61) Southborough, Massachusetts, U.S.
- Height: 5 ft 10 in (178 cm)
- Weight: 185 lb (84 kg; 13 st 3 lb)
- Position: Right wing
- Shot: Right
- Played for: New Jersey Devils; Pittsburgh Penguins; Detroit Red Wings
- National team: United States
- NHL draft: Undrafted
- Playing career: 1986–2001

Douglas Allen Brown (born June 12, 1964) is an American former professional ice hockey right winger. He played in the National Hockey League with the New Jersey Devils, Pittsburgh Penguins, and Detroit Red Wings between 1987 and 2001. With Detroit he won the Stanley Cup twice, in 1997 and 1998. Internationally he played for the American national team at four World Championships and the 1991 Canada Cup.

== Playing career ==
After playing four seasons with Boston College, Brown was signed as an undrafted free agent by the New Jersey Devils on August 6, 1986. Before playing hockey at Boston College, Brown played on St. Mark's School's varsity hockey team and was a member of the class of 1982. St. Mark's is a private school located in Southborough, Massachusetts.

Brown made his professional debut with the American Hockey League's Maine Mariners in the 1986–87 season. He also appeared in four NHL games with the Devils that same season. After six seasons with the Devils, Brown joined the Pittsburgh Penguins for the 1993–94 season. He then joined the Detroit Red Wings in 1994–95. Brown is a two-time Stanley Cup winner, having won the Cup in consecutive years with the Red Wings in 1997 and 1998.

The Nashville Predators selected Brown in the 1998 NHL Expansion Draft, but traded him back to Detroit three weeks later for Petr Sykora, a draft pick, and future considerations. Brown played three more seasons with the Red Wings before retiring after the 2000–01 season.

Brown appeared in 854 games in his NHL career, scoring 160 goals and adding 216 assists. He also played in 109 Stanley Cup playoff games, scoring 23 goals and recording 23 assists. He was a member of the Detroit Red Wings for their Stanley Cup victories in the 1996–97 and 1997–98 seasons. Brown also represented the American national team in several international competitions.

== Post-playing career ==
Since retiring from the National Hockey League in 2001, Brown has been involved in a variety of venture capital and private equity projects which include technology, oil & gas, real estate and manufactured housing markets, sporting goods, and sports teams.

Brown is the founder and managing partner of Trinity Global Partners, LLC. Trinity is a financial and technology management consulting firm. Its clients include Authentic4D and Titan Advisors, a $4.5 billion fund of hedge funds.

== Personal life ==
Brown's brother Greg also played in the NHL with the Buffalo Sabres, Pittsburgh Penguins and Winnipeg Jets. He attended and played for Boston College, and is currently the head coach of the Boston College Eagles.

Brown's son Patrick is a player for the Boston Bruins, having played four seasons at Boston College from 2010 to 2014. Patrick was coached by his uncle Greg for all four years, including his senior season when he was captain. Doug's son Christopher played for Boston College, and was drafted in 2014 by the Buffalo Sabres.

Wellington Mara, NFL Hall of Famer and former owner of the New York Giants, was Brown's father-in-law. Through marriage, Brown is the uncle of actresses Rooney and Kate Mara.

== Career statistics ==
=== Regular season and playoffs ===
			Regular season					Playoffs
Season	Team	League	GP	G	A	Pts	PIM	GP	G	A	Pts	PIM
1980–81	St. Mark's School	HS-MA	—	—	—	—	—	—	—	—	—	—
1981–82	St. Mark's School	HS-MA	—	—	—	—	—	—	—	—	—	—
1982–83	Boston College	ECAC	22	9	8	17	0	—	—	—	—	—
1983–84	Boston College	ECAC	38	11	10	21	6	—	—	—	—	—
1984–85	Boston College	ECAC	35	37	31	68	20	—	—	—	—	—
1985–86	Boston College	ECAC	38	16	40	56	16	—	—	—	—	—
1986–87	Maine Mariners	AHL	73	24	34	58	15	—	—	—	—	—
1986–87	New Jersey Devils	NHL	4	0	1	1	0	—	—	—	—	—
1987–88	Utica Devils	AHL	2	0	2	2	2	—	—	—	—	—
1987–88	New Jersey Devils	NHL	70	14	11	25	20	19	5	1	6	6
1988–89	Utica Devils	AHL	4	1	4	5	0	—	—	—	—	—
1988–89	New Jersey Devils	NHL	63	15	10	25	15	—	—	—	—	—
1989–90	New Jersey Devils	NHL	69	14	20	34	16	6	0	1	1	2
1990–91	New Jersey Devils	NHL	58	14	16	30	4	7	2	2	4	2
1991–92	New Jersey Devils	NHL	71	11	17	28	27	—	—	—	—	—
1992–93	Utica Devils	AHL	25	11	17	28	8	—	—	—	—	—
1992–93	New Jersey Devils	NHL	15	0	5	5	2	—	—	—	—	—
1993–94	Pittsburgh Penguins	NHL	77	18	37	55	18	6	0	0	0	2
1994–95	Detroit Red Wings	NHL	45	9	12	21	16	18	4	8	12	2
1995–96	Detroit Red Wings	NHL	62	12	15	27	4	13	3	3	6	4
1996–97	Detroit Red Wings	NHL	49	6	7	13	8	14	3	3	6	2
1997–98	Detroit Red Wings	NHL	80	19	23	42	12	9	4	2	6	0
1998–99	Detroit Red Wings	NHL	80	9	19	28	42	10	2	2	4	4
1999–00	Detroit Red Wings	NHL	51	10	8	18	12	3	0	1	1	0
2000–01	Detroit Red Wings	NHL	60	9	13	22	14	4	0	0	0	2
NHL totals			854	160	214	374	210	109	23	23	46	26

=== International ===
Year	Team	Event	GP	G	A	Pts	PIM
1986	United States	WC	10	2	1	3	2
1989	United States	WC	10	1	2	3	0
1991	United States	WC	10	0	1	1	0
1991	United States	CC	8	1	2	3	0
2001	United States	WC	8	1	3	4	4
Senior totals			46	5	9	14	6

== Transactions ==
- August 6, 1986 signed as a free agent by the New Jersey Devils.
- September 28, 1993 signed as a free agent by the Pittsburgh Penguins.
- January 18, 1995 claimed in the waiver draft by the Detroit Red Wings.
- January 7, 1998 signed a 3-year contract extension with the Detroit Red Wings.
- June 26, 1998 claimed by the Nashville Predators in the expansion draft.
- July 14, 1998 traded by the Nashville Predators to the Detroit Red Wings in exchange for Petr Sýkora, 1999 third round pick (#91-Mike Comrie), 1999 conditional fourth round pick (#124-Alexander Krevsun) or future considerations.

== Awards and honors ==
Award	Year
All-Hockey East Second Team	1984–85
AHCA East Second-Team All-American	1984–85
Hockey East All-Tournament Team	1985
All-Hockey East Second Team	1985–86
AHCA East Second-Team All-American	1985–86
2x NHL Stanley Cup champion	1997 and 1998

Brown currently sits on the board of directors at the Michigan Sports Hall of Fame, and is an inductee of the Boston College and St. Mark's Hall of Fame.
