= Joe Kocur =

Canadian ice hockey player (born 1964)

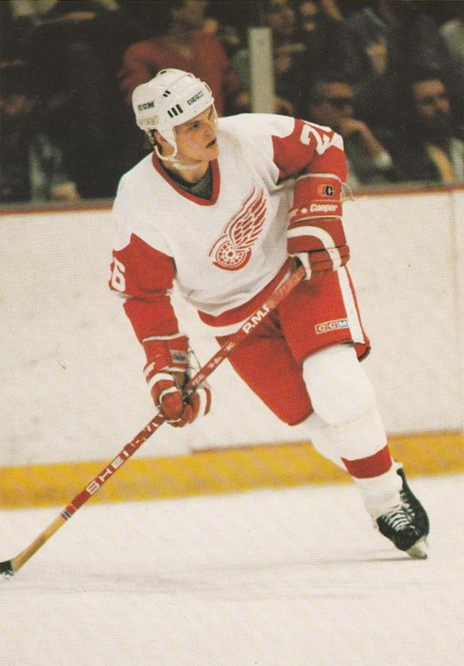
- Born: December 21, 1964 (age 61) Kelvington, Saskatchewan, Canada
- Height: 6 ft 0 in (183 cm)
- Weight: 223 lb (101 kg; 15 st 13 lb)
- Position: Right wing
- Shot: Right
- Played for: Detroit Red Wings; New York Rangers; Vancouver Canucks
- NHL draft: 88th overall, 1983; Detroit Red Wings
- Playing career: 1983–1999

Gregory Joseph "Joey" Kocur (born December 21, 1964) is a Canadian former professional ice hockey player. He is best known for his activities as a fighter and enforcer, as well as being one half of the "Bruise Brothers" with then- Detroit Red Wings teammate Bob Probert, during the late 1980s and early 1990s.

== Career ==
Known for his physical play, Kocur was one of the most penalized players in NHL history, amassing a career total of 2,519 penalty minutes in stints with the Detroit Red Wings, the New York Rangers and the Vancouver Canucks. Kocur officially retired at the end of the 1998–1999 season. He served as a video coach to Scotty Bowman from the 2001 season until Bowman's retirement following the 2002 season. Under head coach Dave Lewis, Kocur served as an associate coach along with Barry Smith; he was not asked to return after the hiring of coach Mike Babcock.

Kocur was best known for his devastating right-hand punch; he so frequently hit players with his right hand, often landing blows on their helmets or teeth, his right hand was often in poor condition.

In an interview, Donald Brashear described how Kocur cracked his helmet with his punches; though his helmet absorbed most of the blow, he still felt serious pain in his gums even on the other side of his face, leaving him unable to eat for a day or so. Kocur's punches often seriously injured players, such as Brad Dalgarno of the New York Islanders, whose orbital bone, cheek bone, and jaw were fractured by Kocur.

Kocur left the NHL following the 1996 season and was playing in the International Hockey League when the Red Wings brought him back during the 1996–97 season after captain Steve Yzerman recommended him to head coach Scotty Bowman. Although he did not fight as much as in his younger days, Kocur brought an element of toughness to the Wings that had been lost with the departures of Probert and Stu Grimson. Kocur scored goals in the 1997 and 1998 Stanley Cup finals series, helping the Wings win the Stanley Cup both times. Kocur had previously won a Stanley Cup ring as a member of the 1993-94 New York Rangers.

=== Post-hockey career ===
Kocur is president of the Detroit Red Wings Alumni Association and is active in its efforts to raise money for children's charities in Metro Detroit. In 2010, he created Kocur Enterprises and is a manufacturer's representative of specialty products serving commercial, industrial and municipal markets in several states. In 2012, he started his own charity called The Joe Kocur Foundation for Children. The foundation holds an annual charity softball game in Highland Township Michigan every August.

== Family ==
Kocur lives in Michigan with his wife Kristen, son Liam, and daughter Kendall. Kocur is a cousin of former NHL player Wendel Clark and former NHL player and coach Barry Melrose.

== In media ==
Along with former teammate Bob Probert, Kocur is featured in a book entitled Bruise Brothers by Bob Duff.

Kocur makes occasional cameo appearances playing adult league hockey in Waterford, Michigan. On December 31, 2013, Kocur appeared in the second game of the NHL Alumni Showdown at Comerica Park in Detroit, part of the Hockeytown Winter Festival leading up to the 2014 NHL Winter Classic. Kocur, who wore the number 26 sweater during his playing days, honored his deceased Bruise Brother, Bob Probert, by wearing Probert's number 24 sweater. Kocur and his Grind Line Detroit Red Wings teammates were honored in the Fall of 2021 by the Michigan Sports Hall of Fame in Detroit.

== Career statistics ==
Bold indicates led league

			Regular season					Playoffs
Season	Team	League	GP	G	A	Pts	PIM	GP	G	A	Pts	PIM
1980–81	Yorkton Terriers	SJHL	48	6	9	15	307	—	—	—	—	—
1981–82	Yorkton Terriers	SJHL	47	20	21	41	199	—	—	—	—	—
1982–83	Saskatoon Blades	WHL	62	23	17	40	289	6	2	3	5	25
1983–84	Saskatoon Blades	WHL	69	40	41	81	258	—	—	—	—	—
1983–84	Adirondack Red Wings	AHL	—	—	—	—	—	5	0	0	0	20
1984–85	Adirondack Red Wings	AHL	47	12	7	19	171	—	—	—	—	—
1984–85	Detroit Red Wings	NHL	17	1	0	1	64	3	1	0	1	5
1985–86	Adirondack Red Wings	AHL	9	6	2	8	34	—	—	—	—	—
1985–86	Detroit Red Wings	NHL	59	9	6	15	**377**	—	—	—	—	—
1986–87	Detroit Red Wings	NHL	77	9	9	18	276	16	2	3	5	71
1987–88	Detroit Red Wings	NHL	63	7	7	14	263	10	0	1	1	13
1988–89	Detroit Red Wings	NHL	60	9	9	18	213	3	0	1	1	6
1989–90	Detroit Red Wings	NHL	71	16	20	36	268	—	—	—	—	—
1990–91	Detroit Red Wings	NHL	52	5	4	9	253	—	—	—	—	—
1990–91	New York Rangers	NHL	5	0	0	0	36	6	0	2	2	21
1991–92	New York Rangers	NHL	51	7	4	11	121	12	1	1	2	38
1992–93	New York Rangers	NHL	65	3	6	9	131	—	—	—	—	—
1993–94	New York Rangers	NHL	71	2	1	3	129	20	1	1	2	17
1994–95	New York Rangers	NHL	48	1	2	3	71	10	0	0	0	8
1995–96	New York Rangers	NHL	38	1	2	3	49	—	—	—	—	—
1995–96	Vancouver Canucks	NHL	7	0	1	1	19	1	0	0	0	0
1996–97	San Antonio Dragons	IHL	5	1	1	2	24	—	—	—	—	—
1996–97	Detroit Red Wings	NHL	34	2	1	3	70	19	1	3	4	22
1997–98	Detroit Red Wings	NHL	63	6	5	11	92	18	4	0	4	30
1998–99	Detroit Red Wings	NHL	39	2	5	7	87	—	—	—	—	—
NHL totals			820	80	82	162	2,519	118	10	12	22	231

== Achievements ==
- 1994 Stanley Cup Champion (NYR)
- 1997 Stanley Cup Champion (Detroit)
- 1998 Stanley Cup Champion (Detroit)
- 2002 Stanley Cup Champion (Detroit as video coach)
- 2016 National Polish-American Sports Hall of Fame

== See also ==
- List of NHL players with 2,000 career penalty minutes
