= Kirk Maltby =

Canadian ice hockey player (born 1972)

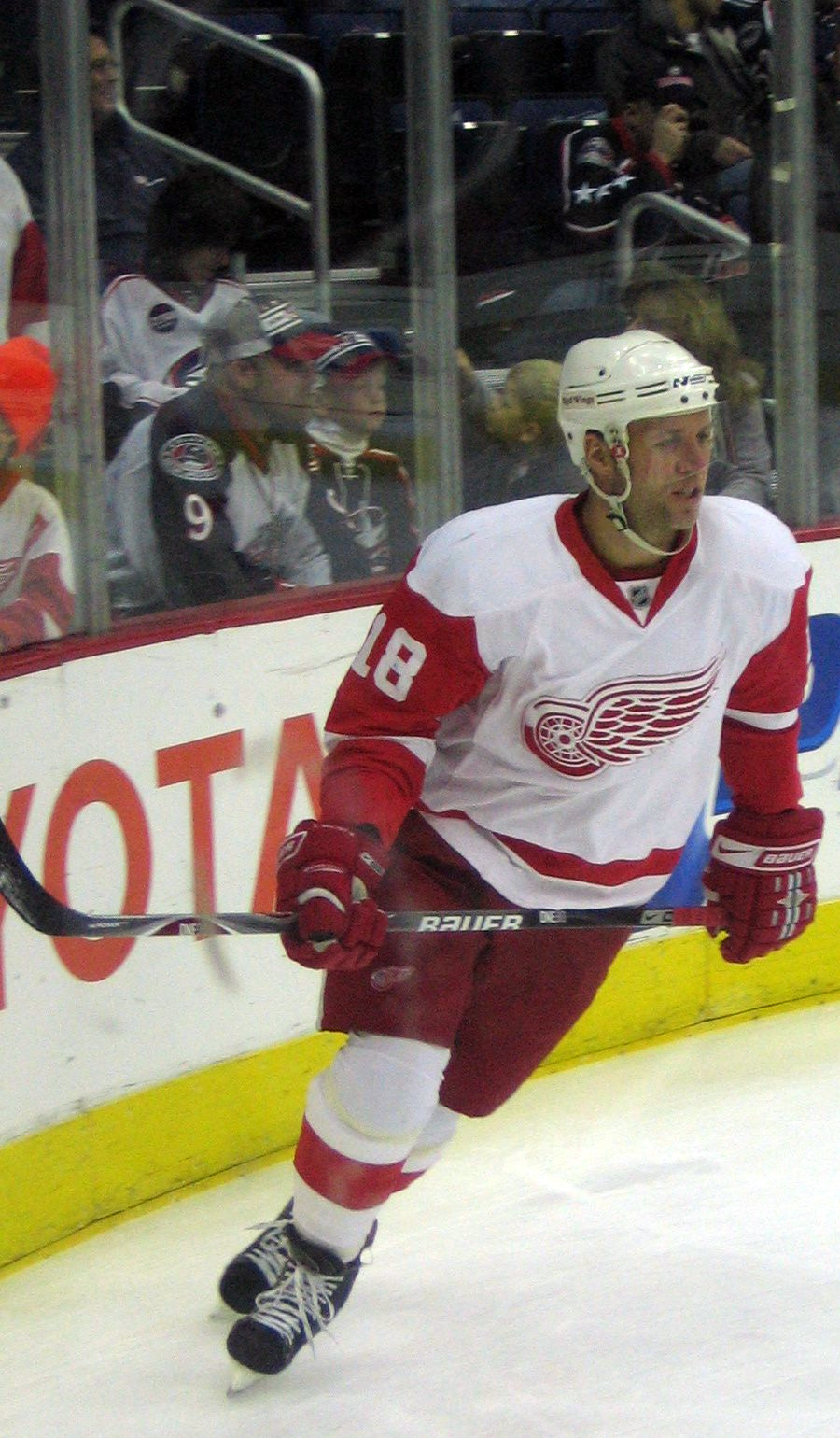
- Maltby with the Detroit Red Wings in 2007
- Born: December 22, 1972 (age 53) Guelph, Ontario, Canada
- Height: 6 ft 0 in (183 cm)
- Weight: 195 lb (88 kg; 13 st 13 lb)
- Position: Left wing
- Shot: Right
- Played for: Edmonton Oilers; Detroit Red Wings; Cambridge Winterhawks Hespeler Shamrocks A
- National team: Canada
- NHL draft: 65th overall, 1992; Edmonton Oilers
- Playing career: 1992–2010

Kirk Frederick Maltby (born December 22, 1972) is a Canadian former professional ice hockey winger who played 16 seasons in the National Hockey League (NHL) for the Edmonton Oilers and Detroit Red Wings, the latter with whom he won the Stanley Cup four times.

He is currently employed as a professional scout by the Red Wings.

== Playing career ==
Maltby grew up in the town of Hespeler, Ontario and played most of his minor hockey for the Hespeler Shamrocks A club of the OMHA. As a Midget-aged player, Maltby suited up for the Cambridge Winterhawks Jr.B. club of the OHA in 1988-89.

After that season, Maltby was a fourth round selection of the Owen Sound Platers in the 1989 OHL Priority Selection. While in Owen Sound, he played with future NHL'ers Andrew Brunette, Scott Walker, Kevin Weekes and Jamie Storr.

Having spent his junior years with the Owen Sound Platers of the OHL, Maltby was selected in the third round, 65th overall by the Edmonton Oilers in the 1992 Draft. Maltby spent his entire rookie year at the Cape Breton Oilers of the AHL and played his first NHL season in 1993 playing 68 games and scoring 11 goals and 8 assists for 19 points and 74 penalty minutes. He played for the Oilers another 2 seasons before moving to the Detroit Red Wings during the 1995–96 NHL season, in which he was traded on March 20 by the Oilers to the Red Wings in exchange for defenceman Dan McGillis.

Maltby spent 14 seasons with the Red Wings, helping them win 4 Stanley Cup titles (1997, 1998, 2002, 2008). He played on the "Grind Line" with teammates Kris Draper and Darren McCarty and Joe Kocur for a number of years.

Although Maltby was a rather prolific scorer in the Canadian junior leagues, he never netted a 20-goal season nor did he reach 40 points in a season. Instead, he gained a reputation around the NHL as a solid checking forward and agitator who is able to instigate his opponents into taking a cheap penalty. As a result, he was named to the Canadian National Team for the 2005 World Championships. His best statistical season was 2002–03, when he set career highs in goals (14), assists (23), points (37), and penalty minutes (91).

On February 27, 2009, Maltby played in his 1000th career game, in which the Red Wings defeated the Los Angeles Kings 2–1 at Joe Louis Arena in Detroit. Maltby's most recent contract with the Red Wings expired following the 2009–2010 season.

On October 12, 2010, Maltby officially announced his retirement from the NHL. The same day he also announced he will take a job as a pro scout with the Detroit Red Wings.

== International play ==
Medal record

Representing Canada

Men's ice hockey

World Cup of Hockey
Gold medal – first place	2004 Canada	

World Championships
Gold medal – first place	2003 Finland	
Silver medal – second place	2005 Austria	

Maltby has participated in three international tournaments for Canada:

- 2003 IIHF World Championship
- 2004 World Cup of Hockey
- 2005 IIHF World Championship

== Personal life ==
Kirk Maltby resides in the Grosse Pointe, Michigan area during the season and splits his off-season between his Michigan home and his Hespeler, Ontario residence. He and his wife Wendy have a daughter named Ella, born March 22, 2004 and fraternal twins: son Landon and daughter Leighton, born July 17, 2008.

== Career statistics ==
=== Regular season and playoffs ===
			Regular season					Playoffs
Season	Team	League	GP	G	A	Pts	PIM	GP	G	A	Pts	PIM
1988–89	Cambridge Winterhawks	MWJHL	48	28	18	46	138	—	—	—	—	—
1989–90	Owen Sound Platers	OHL	61	12	15	27	90	12	1	6	7	15
1990–91	Owen Sound Platers	OHL	66	34	32	66	100	—	—	—	—	—
1991–92	Owen Sound Platers	OHL	64	50	41	91	99	5	3	3	6	18
1992–93	Cape Breton Oilers	AHL	73	22	23	45	130	16	3	3	6	45
1993–94	Edmonton Oilers	NHL	68	11	8	19	74	—	—	—	—	—
1994–95	Edmonton Oilers	NHL	47	8	3	11	49	—	—	—	—	—
1995–96	Cape Breton Oilers	AHL	4	1	2	3	6	—	—	—	—	—
1995–96	Edmonton Oilers	NHL	49	2	6	8	61	—	—	—	—	—
1995–96	Detroit Red Wings	NHL	6	1	0	1	6	8	0	1	1	4
1996–97	Detroit Red Wings	NHL	66	3	5	8	75	20	5	2	7	24
1997–98	Detroit Red Wings	NHL	65	14	9	23	89	22	3	1	4	30
1998–99	Detroit Red Wings	NHL	53	8	6	14	34	10	1	0	1	8
1999–00	Detroit Red Wings	NHL	41	6	8	14	24	8	0	1	1	4
2000–01	Detroit Red Wings	NHL	79	12	7	19	22	6	0	0	0	6
2001–02	Detroit Red Wings	NHL	82	9	15	24	40	23	3	3	6	32
2002–03	Detroit Red Wings	NHL	82	14	23	37	91	4	0	0	0	4
2003–04	Detroit Red Wings	NHL	79	14	19	33	80	12	1	3	4	11
2005–06	Detroit Red Wings	NHL	82	5	6	11	80	6	2	1	3	4
2006–07	Detroit Red Wings	NHL	82	6	5	11	50	18	1	1	2	10
2007–08	Detroit Red Wings	NHL	61	6	4	10	32	12	0	1	1	10
2008–09	Detroit Red Wings	NHL	78	5	6	11	28	20	0	1	1	2
2009–10	Detroit Red Wings	NHL	52	4	2	6	32	—	—	—	—	—
NHL totals			1,072	128	132	260	867	169	16	15	31	149

=== International ===
Year	Team	Event	Result	GP	G	A	Pts	PIM
2003	Canada	WC	1st place, gold medalist(s)	9	2	2	4	8
2004	Canada	WCH	1st place, gold medalist(s)	DNP	—	—	—	—
2005	Canada	WC	2nd place, silver medalist(s)	9	1	1	2	8
Senior totals				18	3	3	6	16
