= Martin Lapointe =

Canadian ice hockey player (born 1973)

- Born: September 12, 1973 (age 53) Ville St. Pierre, Quebec, Canada
- Height: 5 ft 11 in (180 cm)
- Weight: 215 lb (98 kg; 15 st 5 lb)
- Position: Right wing
- Shot: Right
- Played for: Detroit Red Wings; Boston Bruins; Chicago Blackhawks; Ottawa Senators
- National team: Canada
- NHL draft: 10th overall, 1991; Detroit Red Wings
- Playing career: 1992–2008

Martin T. Lapointe (born September 12, 1973) is a Canadian former professional ice hockey player. He played in the National Hockey League (NHL) for the Detroit Red Wings, Boston Bruins, Chicago Blackhawks, and Ottawa Senators. He won the Stanley Cup as a member of the Red Wings in both 1997 and 1998. As of 2025, he is the director of player development for the Montreal Canadiens.

== Playing career ==
Lapointe was selected 10th overall by the Detroit Red Wings in the 1991 NHL entry draft. He has played in 991 career NHL games as of the 2007–08 NHL season, scoring 181 goals and 200 assists for 381 points. He also compiled 1,143 career penalty minutes. He won two Stanley Cup championships as a member of the Red Wings, in 1997 and 1998.

In the summer of 2001, he signed a 4-year free agent contract with the Boston Bruins. After the NHL lockout wiped out the entire 2004–05 season, he signed a 3-year free agent deal with Chicago in August 2005. He later served as Blackhawks' captain for the latter portion of the 2005–06 season due to an injury to Adrian Aucoin.

Lapointe had played in 209 consecutive games with Chicago and 254 straight overall before he sat out Jan. 16 against St. Louis with what was believed to be the flu. Prior to that, his last absence had been Dec. 29, 2003, with Boston. On February 26, 2008, Lapointe was traded by the Chicago Blackhawks to the Ottawa Senators for a sixth round draft pick. After the season, Lapointe was not re-signed by the Senators and became an unrestricted free agent.

== Post-retirement ==
On December 5, 2009, the Blackhawks hired Lapointe as a pro scout. On June 13, 2012, Montreal Canadiens General Manager Marc Bergevin named Lapointe Director of Player Development for the Canadiens. In 2021, he was appointed the director of amateur scouting for the Canadiens.

== Personal life ==
A hockey rink in Lachine, Quebec, is named in Lapointe's honor. He and his wife have three sons and a daughter. His oldest son Guyot played for the D3 ACHA team at the University of Michigan, graduating in 2019. His son, Philippe, currently plays ice hockey for the Michigan Wolverines men's ice hockey team.

== Career statistics ==
=== Regular season and playoffs ===
			Regular season					Playoffs
Season	Team	League	GP	G	A	Pts	PIM	GP	G	A	Pts	PIM
1988–89	Lac St-Louis Lions	QMAAA	42	39	45	84	46	3	6	2	8	4
1989–90	Laval Titan	QMJHL	65	42	54	96	77	14	8	17	25	54
1989–90	Laval Titan	M-Cup	—	—	—	—	—	4	1	1	2	4
1990–91	Laval Titan	QMJHL	64	44	54	98	66	13	7	14	21	26
1991–92	Detroit Red Wings	NHL	4	0	1	1	5	3	0	1	1	4
1991–92	Laval Titan	QMJHL	31	25	30	55	84	10	4	10	14	34
1991–92	Adirondack Red Wings	AHL	—	—	—	—	—	8	2	2	4	4
1992–93	Laval Titan	QMJHL	35	38	51	89	41	13	13	17	30	20
1992–93	Laval Titan	M-Cup	—	—	—	—	—	5	1	8	9	11
1992–93	Adirondack Red Wings	AHL	8	1	2	3	9	—	—	—	—	—
1992–93	Detroit Red Wings	NHL	3	0	0	0	0	—	—	—	—	—
1993–94	Adirondack Red Wings	AHL	28	25	21	46	47	4	1	1	2	8
1993–94	Detroit Red Wings	NHL	50	8	8	16	55	4	0	0	0	6
1994–95	Adirondack Red Wings	AHL	39	29	16	45	80	—	—	—	—	—
1994–95	Detroit Red Wings	NHL	39	4	6	10	73	2	0	1	1	8
1995–96	Detroit Red Wings	NHL	58	6	3	9	93	11	1	2	3	12
1996–97	Detroit Red Wings	NHL	78	16	17	33	167	20	4	8	12	60
1997–98	Detroit Red Wings	NHL	79	15	19	34	106	21	9	6	15	20
1998–99	Detroit Red Wings	NHL	77	16	13	29	141	10	0	2	2	20
1999–00	Detroit Red Wings	NHL	82	16	25	41	121	9	3	1	4	20
2000–01	Detroit Red Wings	NHL	82	27	30	57	127	6	0	1	1	8
2001–02	Boston Bruins	NHL	68	17	23	40	101	6	1	2	3	12
2002–03	Boston Bruins	NHL	59	8	10	18	87	5	1	0	1	14
2003–04	Boston Bruins	NHL	78	15	10	25	67	7	0	0	0	14
2005–06	Chicago Blackhawks	NHL	82	14	17	31	106	—	—	—	—	—
2006–07	Chicago Blackhawks	NHL	82	13	11	24	98	—	—	—	—	—
2007–08	Chicago Blackhawks	NHL	52	3	4	7	47	—	—	—	—	—
2007–08	Ottawa Senators	NHL	18	3	3	6	23	4	0	0	0	4
NHL totals			991	181	200	381	1,417	108	19	24	43	202

=== International ===
Year	Team	Event	GP	G	A	Pts	PIM
1991	Canada	WJC	7	0	3	3	2
1992	Canada	WJC	7	4	1	5	10
1993	Canada	WJC	7	5	4	9	6
2000	Canada	WC	3	0	0	0	4
Junior totals			21	9	8	17	18
Senior totals			3	0	0	0	4

== See also ==
- Captain (ice hockey)

Preceded by Keith Primeau	Detroit Red Wings first-round draft pick 1991	Succeeded by Curtis Bowen
Preceded by Adrian Aucoin	Chicago Blackhawks captain 2006; While Aucoin was injured	Succeeded by Adrian Aucoin
