= Barry Smith (ice hockey, born 1952) =

American ice hockey coach

- Born: 21 August 1952 (age 74) Buffalo, New York, U.S.
- Playing career: 1975–present

Barry Smith (born August 21, 1952) is an American ice hockey coach.

== Career ==
Smith began his coaching career in 1975 with Elmira College. In 1986, he began a long career as an assistant and associate coach in the National Hockey League, working with the Buffalo Sabres, Pittsburgh Penguins, Detroit Red Wings, and Phoenix Coyotes, winning seven Stanley Cups along the way. Smith also coached five games for the Red Wings in 1998 after head coach Scotty Bowman was unable to start the season behind the bench due to knee surgery. In 2008, he became head coach of SKA St. Petersburg of the Kontinental Hockey League. After being a pro scout for the Chicago Blackhawks, he was the head coach of HC Lugano in Switzerland's NLA. In 2021, he became the head coach of Djurgårdens IF Hockey a Swedish team in the Swedish Hockey League contract lasting for one year with possibility of extension. In October 2021, Djurgårdens IF Hockey announced Smith's departure, following a poor run of form at the beginning of the season.

== Coaching record ==
Team	Year	Regular season						Postseason
Team	Year	G	W	L	T	Pts	Finish	Result
Detroit Red Wings	1998–99	5	4	1	0	8	1st in Central	(returned to assistant coaching role)

== Awards and achievements ==
Assistant coach

- 1991 Stanley Cup Championship (Pittsburgh)
- 1992 Stanley Cup Championship (Pittsburgh)
- 1997 Stanley Cup Championship (Detroit)
- 1998 Stanley Cup Championship (Detroit)
- 2002 Stanley Cup Championship (Detroit)
- 2013 Stanley Cup Championship (Chicago Blackhawks)
- 2015 Stanley Cup Championship (Chicago Blackhawks)
