= 2014 NHL Winter Classic =

Outdoor National Hockey League game in Ann Arbor, Michigan

	1	2	3	OT	SO	Total
Toronto Maple Leafs	0	1	1	0	1 (2/3)	3
Detroit Red Wings	0	1	1	0	0 (1/3)	2
- Date: January 1, 2014
- Venue: Michigan Stadium
- City: Ann Arbor
- Attendance: 105,491

The 2014 NHL Winter Classic was an outdoor ice hockey game played in the National Hockey League (NHL) on January 1, 2014, at Michigan Stadium in Ann Arbor, Michigan. The sixth edition of the Winter Classic, it matched the Toronto Maple Leafs against the Detroit Red Wings; the Maple Leafs defeated the Red Wings, 3–2, in a shootout to move past the Red Wings in the Atlantic Division. The game was televised nationally in Canada on CBC and nationally in the United States on NBC. The game set an NHL attendance record of 105,491, surpassing the previous record set during the 2008 NHL Winter Classic.

The game was originally planned to be played on January 1, 2013, as the 2013 NHL Winter Classic, but was postponed until the following year due to the 2012–13 NHL lockout. The 2014 Winter Classic was one of six outdoor games held during the 2013–14 NHL season, which included the new 2014 NHL Stadium Series of four games and the 2014 Heritage Classic. These six games served as the NHL's premiere showcase games for the season as there was no All Star Game due to the 2014 Winter Olympics.

The event was the first Winter Classic to be held at a stadium dedicated solely to college football. It was also the first whose festivities were split between two locations, as the NHL Alumni Showdown and other side events were held on a second rink constructed at Comerica Park in downtown Detroit.

== Background ==
=== Initial announcement ===
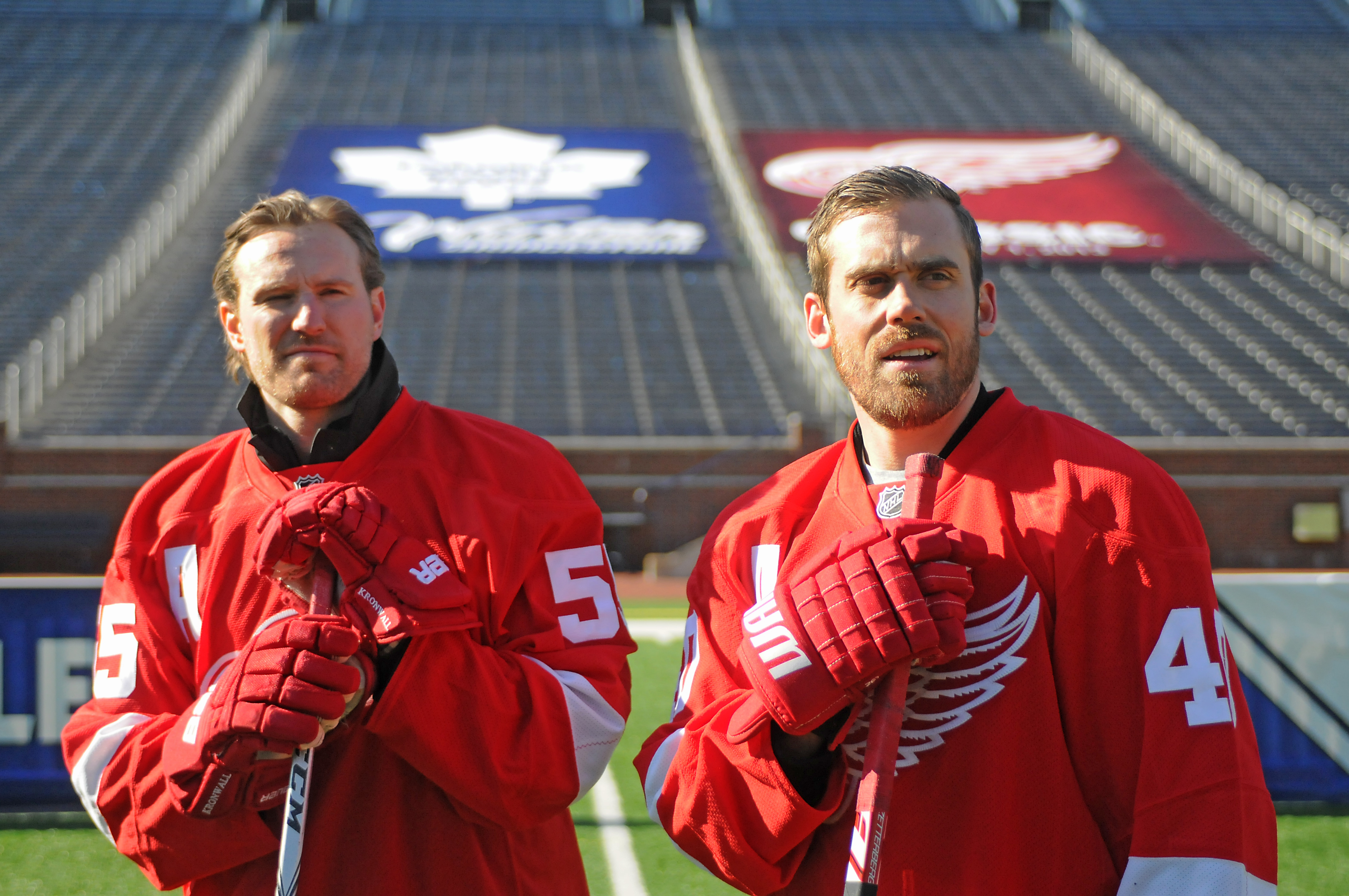
Niklas Kronwall and Henrik Zetterberg at Comerica Park during the announcement for the Winter Classic, February 2012

After the success of "The Big Chill at the Big House" at Michigan Stadium on December 11, 2010, where Michigan's hockey team defeated Michigan State University, 5–0, outdoors in front of 104,173 spectators, interest began in also holding an NHL Winter Classic game there. On February 8, 2012, the University of Michigan Board of Regents authorized athletic director Dave Brandon to negotiate a contract with the NHL regarding the Winter Classic. On February 9, 2012, the NHL announced at Comerica Park that the 2013 Classic would take place at Michigan Stadium, while the Great Lakes Invitational would take place at Comerica Park. Some OHL and AHL games were also slated to be played at Comerica Park.

The NHL Alumni Showdown coaches were named on July 26, 2012. Former Red Wings coach Scotty Bowman along with assistant Barry Smith were to coach the Red Wings' alumni team. The pair of Bowman and Smith coached three Stanley Cup wins in Detroit. Former Maple Leaf coach Pat Quinn was to coach the Maple Leafs' alumni team, along with Red Kelly, Hall of Fame player and former Maple Leafs' coach.

The Red Wings-Maple Leafs matchup, an Original Six era rivalry, was the first time a United States city's team and a Canadian city's team faced each other in an outdoor NHL game. U.S. teams had not competed in the outdoor Heritage Classic games since their inception in 2003, and Canadian teams had not played in the Winter Classic, which the Heritage Classic spawned in 2009. The unexpectedly high television viewership from the 2011 Stanley Cup Finals (which featured the Vancouver Canucks against the Boston Bruins) prompted the league and NBC to reconsider the conventional wisdom that a contest featuring a Canadian team would not draw as well as two U.S. teams in the United States. (NBC ratings do not count the network's millions of Canadian viewers.) It was this reconsideration that prompted an Ontario-Michigan Winter Classic.

=== Cancellation and postponement ===
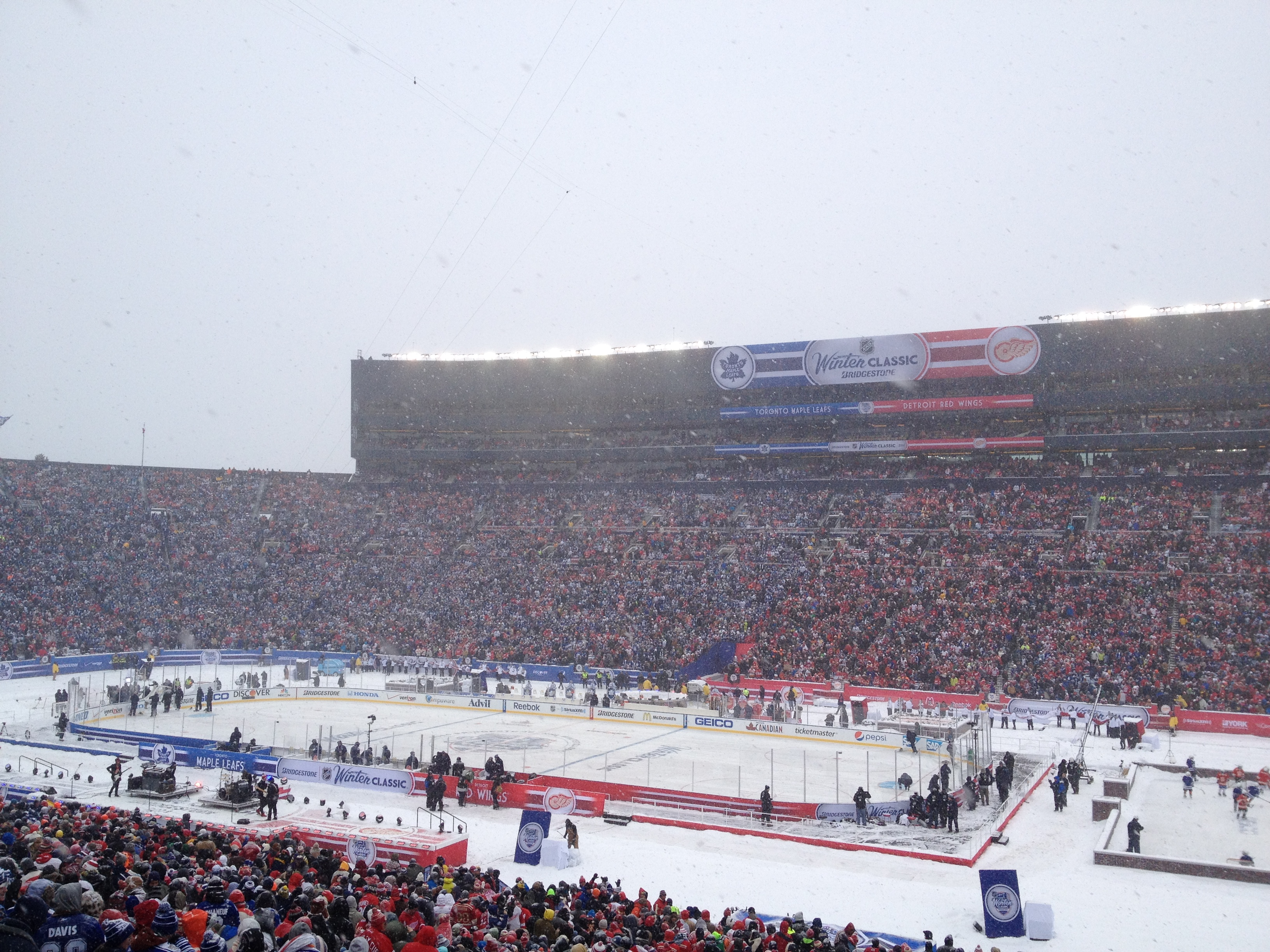
The 2014 NHL Winter Classic before the opening face-off

On November 2, 2012, the NHL cancelled the game due to the 2012–13 NHL lockout. The date for the cancellation came as a result of a deadline in the league's contract with Michigan Stadium, in which the league would have incurred additional expenses if they cancelled after November 2. During the announcement, NHL Deputy Commissioner Bill Daly stated that the 2014 Winter Classic and associated events would be awarded to Ann Arbor and Detroit and would also feature the Maple Leafs and Red Wings. The NHL then officially announced the game on April 7, 2013.

A divisional re-alignment that occurred the preceding offseason also made the Red Wings and Maple Leafs divisional rivals in the new Atlantic Division, which was renamed from the Northeast Division (the old Atlantic Division became the Metropolitan Division). Had the Winter Classic been played in 2013, it would have been the only meeting between the teams, as both were in separate conferences at the time (as division rivals, they can meet 4-5 times a year, ultimately playing 30 times over a seven-year period).

== Game summary ==
January 1, 2014	Toronto Maple Leafs	3–2	SO	Detroit Red Wings	Michigan Stadium	Recap

The game remained scoreless until Daniel Alfredsson scored for the Red Wings at 13:14 of the second period. James van Riemsdyk tied the game for the Leafs with 37 seconds left in the second period. Early in the third, Tyler Bozak gave Toronto the lead. Justin Abdelkader then tied the game with 5:22 in regulation. The game eventually went into a shootout, where Bozak's goal proved to be the difference.

Scoring summary
Period	Team	Goal	Assist(s)	Time	Score
1st	None				
2nd	DET	Daniel Alfredsson (11)	Henrik Zetterberg (22) and Brendan Smith (7)	13:14	1–0 DET
2nd	TOR	James van Riemsdyk (15)	Phil Kessel (18) and Dion Phaneuf (12)	19:23	1–1
3rd	TOR	Tyler Bozak (5)	Dion Phaneuf (13)	4:41	2–1 TOR
3rd	DET	Justin Abdelkader (5)	Brendan Smith (8)	14:28	2–2
OT	None				
Shootout	Team	Shooter	Goaltender	Result	SO Score
Shootout	DET	Daniel Alfredsson	Jonathan Bernier	miss	
Shootout	TOR	James van Riemsdyk	Jimmy Howard	save	
Shootout	DET	Pavel Datsyuk	Jonathan Bernier	goal	1–0 DET
Shootout	TOR	Joffrey Lupul	Jimmy Howard	goal	1–1
Shootout	DET	Tomas Tatar	Jonathan Bernier	save	1–1
Shootout	TOR	Tyler Bozak	Jimmy Howard	goal	2–1 TOR

Number in parentheses represents the player's total in goals or assists to that point of the season

Penalty summary
Period	Team	Player	Penalty	Time	PIM
1st	DET	Justin Abdelkader	Cross-checking	6:39	2:00
1st	TOR	Joffrey Lupul	Cross-checking	11:04	2:00
1st	TOR	Dion Phaneuf	Holding	16:21	2:00
2nd	TOR	Jay McClement	High-sticking	11:04	2:00
2nd	DET	Jakub Kindl	Closing hand on puck	17:23	2:00
3rd	TOR	James van Riemsdyk	Hooking	11:45	2:00
Overtime	None				

Shots by period
Team	1	2	3	OT	Total
Toronto	5	13	6	2	26
Detroit	13	14	14	2	43

Power play opportunities
Team	Goals/Opportunities
Toronto	0/2
Detroit	0/4

Three star selections
	Team	Player	Statistics
1st	TOR	Jonathan Bernier	41 Saves (.953)
2nd	DET	Jimmy Howard	24 Saves (.923)
3rd	TOR	Tyler Bozak	1 Goal

== Team rosters ==
Toronto Maple Leafs
#		Player	Position
45	(Canada)	Jonathan Bernier	G
42	(Canada)	Tyler Bozak	C
71	(Canada)	David Clarkson	RW
29	(United States)	Jerry D'Amigo	LW
4	(Canada)	Cody Franson	D
51	(United States)	Jake Gardiner	D
36	(Sweden)	Carl Gunnarsson (A)	D
24	(Canada)	Peter Holland	C
43	(Canada)	Nazem Kadri	C
81	(United States)	Phil Kessel	RW
41	(Russia)	Nikolai Kulemin	LW
19	(Canada)	Joffrey Lupul (A)	LW
11	(Canada)	Jay McClement (A)	C
28	(Canada)	Colton Orr	RW
3	(Canada)	Dion Phaneuf (C)	D
15	(Canada)	Paul Ranger	D
12	(Canada)	Mason Raymond	LW
34	(Canada)	James Reimer	G
44	(Canada)	Morgan Rielly	D
21	(United States)	James van Riemsdyk	LW
Head coach: (Canada) Randy Carlyle

Detroit Red Wings
#		Player	Position
8	(United States)	Justin Abdelkader	LW
11	(Sweden)	Daniel Alfredsson	RW
18	(Sweden)	Joakim Andersson	C
44	(Canada)	Todd Bertuzzi	RW
71	(Canada)	Danny Cleary	RW
13	(Russia)	Pavel Datsyuk (A)	C
65	(United States)	Danny DeKeyser	D
17	(United States)	Patrick Eaves	RW
41	(United States)	Luke Glendening	RW
35	(United States)	Jimmy Howard	G
4	(Czech Republic)	Jakub Kindl	D
55	(Sweden)	Niklas Kronwall (A)	D
23	(United States)	Brian Lashoff	D
20	(United States)	Drew Miller	LW
34	(Czech Republic)	Petr Mrazek	G
14	(Sweden)	Gustav Nyquist	LW
27	(Canada)	Kyle Quincey	D
2	(Canada)	Brendan Smith	D
21	(Slovakia)	Tomas Tatar	LW
40	(Sweden)	Henrik Zetterberg (C)	LW
Head coach: (Canada) Mike Babcock

James Reimer and Petr Mrazek dressed as the back-up goaltenders. Neither entered the game.

=== Scratches ===
- Toronto Maple Leafs: Mark Fraser, John-Michael Liles, Frazer McLaren
- Detroit Red Wings: Mikael Samuelsson, Jonas Gustavsson, Darren Helm

=== Officials ===
- Referees — Dan O'Halloran, Brian Pochmara
- Linesmen — Scott Driscoll, Mark Shewchyk

=== Liles trade ===
Despite taking the warmup and initially being pencilled in as a healthy scratch, John-Michael Liles found out early in the game that he had in fact been traded to the Carolina Hurricanes, alongside Dennis Robertson, for Tim Gleason. Gleason made his Leafs debut on January 7, 2014. Liles scored against his former team two days after Gleason's debut in a 6-1 Carolina win.

== Television ratings ==
The combined average television viewership for the 2014 NHL Winter Classic on NBC in the U.S., and CBC and RDS in Canada was 8.234 million viewers in North America, becoming the most watched regular season game ever. The previous highest combined average television viewership was 6.6 million viewers for the 2011 NHL Winter Classic. The 4.404 million average viewers for NBC's broadcast in the U.S. was the second-largest audience for an NHL regular season game since 1975. The 3.57 million average viewers for CBC's broadcast in Canada was the largest audience ever for an NHL regular season game in Canadian broadcast history. The game garnered a 2.5 rating, tying the 2009 NHL Winter Classic as the highest-rated NHL regular season game since 1975. The rating and viewership for the game were up 19% and 18%, respectively, compared to the 2012 NHL Winter Classic.

== Entertainment ==
Musical guests for the 2014 Winter Classic included The Zac Brown Band and Mayer Hawthorne.

== Hockeytown Winter Festival ==
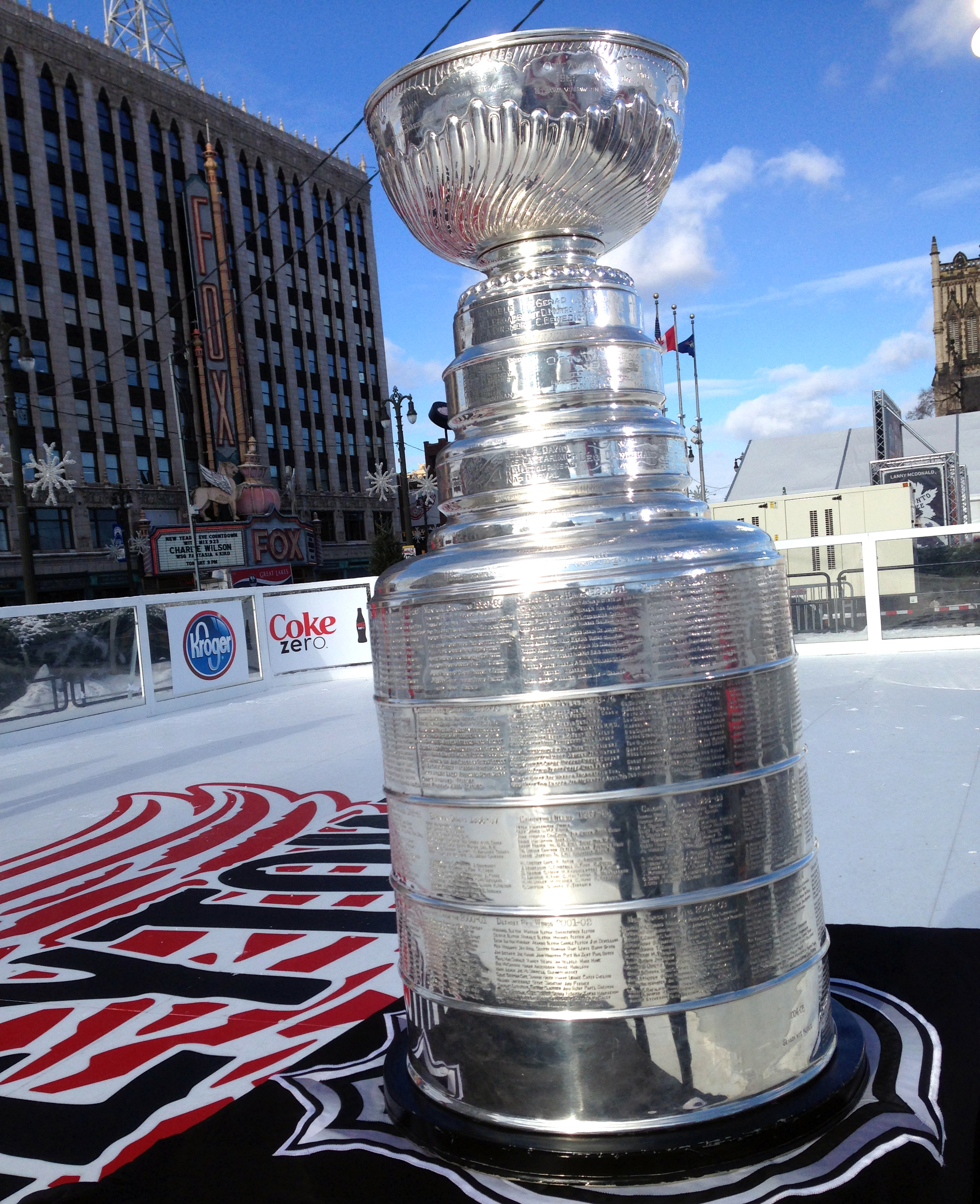
Stanley Cup on display during the Hockeytown Winter Festival, December 2013.

Comerica Park served as the venue for the 2013 Hockeytown Winter Festival, a two-week event that took place in Detroit leading up to the 2014 NHL Winter Classic. As part of this event, on December 27–28, the 2013 Great Lakes Invitational four-game tournament was held, with Western Michigan emerging as champion over in-state rival Michigan Tech. On December 29, two OHL games were played, the first between the Windsor Spitfires and the Saginaw Spirit, and the second between the London Knights and the Plymouth Whalers. These were the first outdoor regular season games for the OHL. The Spitfires won the first game 6–5, while a shootout was required for the second game, with the Whalers getting the 2–1 win. On December 30, in front of 20,337 fans, the AHL affiliates of the Detroit Red Wings and the Toronto Maples Leafs, the Grand Rapids Griffins and the Toronto Marlies played to a shootout, with the Marlies holding the 4–3 edge. This was the seventh outdoor AHL game.

Date	Away team	Score	Home team	Attendance
December 16, 2013	Western Mustangs	5–2	Windsor Lancers	1,000
December 27, 2013	Michigan State Spartans	2–3 (SO)	Michigan Tech Huskies	
December 27, 2013	Western Michigan Broncos	3–2 (OT)	Michigan Wolverines	25,449
December 28, 2013	Michigan State Spartans	3–0	Michigan Wolverines	26,052
December 28, 2013	Michigan Tech Huskies	0–1 (OT)	Western Michigan Broncos	26,052
December 29, 2013	Windsor Spitfires	6–5	Saginaw Spirit	25,749
December 29, 2013	London Knights	1–2 (SO)	Plymouth Whalers	26,384
December 30, 2013	Toronto Marlies	4–3 (SO)	Grand Rapids Griffins	20,337
December 31, 2013	Toronto Maple Leafs Alumni	4–5	Detroit Red Wings Alumni	33,425
December 31, 2013	Toronto Maple Leafs Alumni	5–6 (SO)	Detroit Red Wings Alumni	33,425

== Alumni Showdown ==
As part of the Hockeytown Winter Festival, two consecutive alumni games were played between former players of the Red Wings and the Maple Leafs on December 31. The Detroit Red Wings swept the doubleheader, winning the first alumni game 5–4, and the second alumni game 6–5, following a shootout, in front of 33,425 in attendance at Comerica Park.

In the first alumni game of the doubleheader, Jiri Fischer scored the first goal of the game on a pass from Jason Woolley just 1 minute, 20 seconds into the game. Less than one minute later, Kevin Miller's goal gave the Red Wings a 2–0 lead. The Leafs then got goals from Stew Gavin and Todd Warriner, to tie the game at 2–2. Petr Klima then gave the Red Wings a one-goal lead when he scored on a pass from Martin Lapointe with 4:04 left in the first period.

In the second period, Pat Verbeek's goal from Miller and Mathieu Schneider gave the Red Wings a 4–2 lead with 15:40 left in the second. Aaron Ward scored the eventual game-winner from Fischer and Jimmy Carson with 11:50 left before the Maple Leafs mounted a comeback on goals by Brad May, and Tom Fergus who made it a one-goal game with 2:31 remaining in the second period. The Leafs pulled their goalie for the extra attacker with a minute left. Then, Red Wings coach Scotty Bowman sent 74-year-old Red Berenson, Michigan's head coach, to take the face off with 14.3 seconds left. Berenson was one of two players who participated in the Alumni Showdown who actually started his NHL career in the Original Six era. The other was 68-year-old center Mike Walton, who began his career with the Leafs in 1965.

Prior to the second alumni game of the doubleheader, former linemates Gordie Howe and Ted Lindsay dropped the first puck in a ceremonial faceoff between former captains Steve Yzerman of the Red Wings and Darryl Sittler of the Maple Leafs. Vladimir Konstantinov was then helped onto the ice for a rare Russian Five reunion with his former teammates, Sergei Fedorov, Viacheslav Fetisov, Vyacheslav Kozlov and Igor Larionov. Joe Kocur honored his late Bruise Brother by wearing Bob Probert's number 24 in the second alumni game.

In the second alumni game, goals by Doug Brown, Chris Chelios, Sergei Fedorov, Nicklas Lidstrom and Brendan Shanahan gave the Red Wings a 5–1 lead early in the second period. Three straight unanswered goals from Shayne Corson, Tie Domi and Steve Thomas cut the Red Wings' lead to one goal. Bryan McCabe then scored with two seconds left in regulation, to send the game to a shootout. During the shootout, Tomas Holmstrom scored Detroit's lone goal, to give them the 6–5 victory.

=== Alumni showdown rosters ===
==== Game 1 ====
Toronto Maple Leafs
Coaches: Red Kelly and Pat Quinn

#		Player	Position
24	(Canada)	Dan Daoust	C
12	(Canada)	Mark Osborne	LW
19	(Canada)	Bill Derlago	C
9	(Canada)	Stewart Gavin	LW
15	(Canada)	Pat Boutette	C
12	(Canada)	Rob Pearson	RW
15	(Canada)	Claude Loiselle	C
10	(Canada)	Brad May	LW
27	(Canada)	Shayne Corson	C
19	(United States)	Tom Fergus	C
26	(Canada)	Mike Krushelnyski	C
7	(Canada)	Dave McLlwain	C
20	(Canada)	Mike Johnson	RW
8	(Canada)	Todd Warriner	LW
14	(Canada)	Dave Reid	RW
16	(Russia)	Nikolai Borschevsky	RW
15	(Canada)	Lou Franceschetti	RW
4	(Canada)	Mike Pelyk	D
34	(Canada)	Jamie Macoun	D
33	(United States)	Matt Martin	D
3	(Canada)	Brad Marsh	D
4	(Canada)	Greg Hotham	D
4	(Canada)	Cory Cross	D
1	(Canada)	Mark Laforest	G
2	(Canada)	Peter Ing	G
33	(Canada)	Doug Favell	G

Detroit Red Wings
Coaches: Scotty Bowman and Barry Smith.
Ambassadors: Gordie Howe, Ted Lindsay and Vladimir Konstantinov.

#		Player	Position
25	(Canada)	John Ogrodnick	LW
17	(Canada)	Dallas Drake	RW
10	(United States)	Jimmy Carson	C
20	(Canada)	Martin Lapointe	RW
85	(Czech Republic)	Petr Klima	RW
8	(Canada)	Dennis Polonich	C
7	(Canada)	Red Berenson	C
7	(Canada)	Garry Unger	C
23	(United States)	Kevin Miller	RW
15	(Canada)	Pat Verbeek	RW
21	(Canada)	Paul Ysebaert	LW
14	(Canada)	Brent Fedyk	LW
22	(Canada)	Mike Knuble	RW
12	(Canada)	Mike Sillinger	C
15	(Canada)	Jason Woolley	D
27	(Canada)	Aaron Ward	D
11	(Canada)	Mathieu Dandenault	D
2	(Czech Republic)	Jiri Fischer	D
23	(United States)	Mathieu Schneider	D
28	(Canada)	Steve Duchesne	D
31	(Canada)	Kevin Hodson	G
41	(Canada)	Eddie Mio	G

==== Game 2 ====
Toronto Maple Leafs
Coaches: Red Kelly, Johnny Bower and Pat Quinn

#		Player	Position
27	(Canada)	Darryl Sittler	C
22	(Canada)	Rick Vaive	RW
17	(Canada)	Wendel Clark	LW
93	(Canada)	Doug Gilmour	C
14	(Canada)	Dave Andreychuk	LW
16	(Canada)	Darcy Tucker	RW
18	(Canada)	Kevin Maguire	RW
4	(Canada)	Gary Leeman	RW
9	(Canada)	Russ Courtnall	RW
7	(Canada)	Gary Roberts	LW
7	(Canada)	Lanny McDonald	RW
22	(Canada)	Tiger Williams	LW
16	(Canada)	Mike Walton	C
28	(Canada)	Tie Domi	RW
11	(Canada)	Mike Gartner	RW
25	(Canada)	Joe Nieuwendyk	C
32	(Canada)	Steve Thomas	RW
4	(Canada)	David Ellett	D
24	(Canada)	Bryan McCabe	D
4	(Canada)	Bob McGill	D
33	(United States)	Al Iafrate	D
34	(United States)	Bryan Berard	D
31	(Canada)	Curtis Joseph	G
29	(Canada)	Felix Potvin	G
29	(Canada)	Mike Palmateer	G

Detroit Red Wings
Coaches: Scotty Bowman and Barry Smith.
Ambassadors: Gordie Howe, Ted Lindsay and Vladimir Konstantinov.

#		Player	Position
19	(Canada)	Steve Yzerman	C
14	(Canada)	Brendan Shanahan	RW
8	(Russia)	Igor Larionov	C
20	(Canada)	Mickey Redmond	RW
96	(Sweden)	Tomas Holmstrom	LW
33	(Canada)	Kris Draper	C
18	(Canada)	Kirk Maltby	LW
25	(Canada)	Darren McCarty	RW
26	(Canada)	Joe Kocur	RW
22	(Canada)	Dino Ciccarelli	RW
13	(Russia)	Vyacheslav Kozlov	LW
91	(Russia)	Sergei Fedorov	C
17	(United States)	Doug Brown	RW
5	(Sweden)	Nicklas Lidstrom	D
24	(United States)	Chris Chelios	D
4	(United States)	Mark Howe	D
77	(Canada)	Paul Coffey	D
55	(Canada)	Larry Murphy	D
2	(Russia)	Viacheslav Fetisov	D
28	(United States)	Brian Rafalski	D
30	(Canada)	Chris Osgood	G
34	(Canada)	Manny Legace	G

== See also ==
- NHL Centennial Classic, a 2017 re-match of the game at BMO Field in Toronto.
- List of outdoor ice hockey games
