= NHL Centennial Classic =

Outdoor National Hockey League game

	1	2	3	OT	Total
Detroit Red Wings	0	1	3	0	4
Toronto Maple Leafs	0	0	4	1	5
- Date: January 1, 2017
- Venue: BMO Field
- City: Toronto
- Attendance: 40,148

The NHL Centennial Classic (branded as the Scotiabank NHL Centennial Classic for sponsorship reasons) was a regular season outdoor National Hockey League (NHL) game that was held on January 1, 2017. The game featured the Toronto Maple Leafs taking on the Detroit Red Wings at BMO Field in Toronto. This was the first time an NHL outdoor game was played in Toronto.

Announced on March 9, 2016, the game served as a celebration of the centennial season of the Maple Leafs, and the beginning of the NHL's centennial year. It was one of four outdoor regular season games during the 2016–17 NHL season, the others being the 2016 Heritage Classic, 2017 NHL Winter Classic (held on the following day) and the 2017 NHL Stadium Series game. The hosting Maple Leafs pulled out to a 4–1 lead in the third period, only to have the Red Wings score the tying goal with one second remaining in regulation; in overtime, first overall draft pick Auston Matthews scored the game-winning goal, securing a 5–4 victory for the Leafs.

== Background ==
Toronto and Detroit previously faced each other in the 2014 NHL Winter Classic. The NHL had originally considered having the Maple Leafs host the 2017 edition against the New York Rangers at BMO Field, home of Major League Soccer's Toronto FC and the Canadian Football League's Toronto Argonauts. However, in the wake of the record-low ratings of the 2016 edition (which included the Montreal Canadiens), president of NBC Sports programming Jon Miller argued that the presence of a Canadian team can affect U.S. ratings, as American teams guarantee local audiences.

Despite the presence of the Leafs, NBC's overnight ratings for the 2014 Winter Classic were tied with the 2009 edition as the most-watched Winter Classic. The game was also CBC's most-watched regular season Hockey Night in Canada broadcast in history, and had a combined average viewership of 8.234 million in the U.S. and Canada. The decision to include a Canadian team in the 2014 Winter Classic was influenced by the unexpectedly high ratings performance of the 2011 Stanley Cup Finals (which featured the Boston Bruins and the Vancouver Canucks), which led NBC and the NHL to reconsider the conventional wisdom that a game involving a Canadian opponent would not rate as highly as an all-U.S. matchup.

The 2017 Winter Classic was ultimately awarded to Busch Stadium, and would feature the St. Louis Blues and the Chicago Blackhawks. As January 1, 2017, fell on a Sunday, the NHL followed the precedent of the 2012 Winter Classic and college football bowl games by scheduling the game Monday, January 2, instead of its traditional New Year's Day scheduling. This decision also opened the January 1 date for a special outdoor game awarded to Toronto, known as the Centennial Classic. The event honoured the centennial season of the Maple Leafs, and also kicked off a year-long celebration of the NHL's centennial year of operation.

On November 8, 2016, the NHL announced that Scotiabank would be the title sponsor of the game. Because the naming rights of BMO Field were held by the Bank of Montreal (BMO), a direct competitor to Scotiabank, the league subsequently referred to the stadium as "Exhibition Stadium", the name of the previous venue which occupied BMO Field's site. The game was played with the venue boasting a temporarily expanded capacity. The extra seats had originally been installed for the 2016 Grey Cup, and were also used for the 2016 Major League Soccer Eastern Conference Final and 2016 MLS Cup after Toronto FC earned the right to host those games. Announced attendance of 40,148 broke facility records that had only been recently set by the aforementioned games.

During a pre-game ceremony, the NHL unveiled the first 33 members of its list of the '100 Greatest NHL Players', focusing on players active prior to 1966. The remainder was unveiled during a gala at the 2017 NHL All-Star Game.

== Television ==
In Canada, the game was broadcast in English on Sportsnet and in French on TVA Sports. In the United States, the game was broadcast by NBC. Epix would produce a documentary series, Road to the NHL Outdoor Classics, focusing on team preparations for the Centennial Classic and the 2017 NHL Winter Classic.

An average of 1.077 million viewers watched the U.S. broadcast, although peaking at 1.577 million by the third period.

== Game summary ==
January 1, 2017	Detroit Red Wings	4–5 (OT)	Toronto Maple Leafs	BMO Field	Recap

After a scoreless first period, Anthony Mantha scored in the second to give Detroit a 1–0 lead. Then in the third, goals by Leo Komarov, Mitch Marner, Connor Brown and Auston Matthews put Toronto ahead 4–1 with 7:55 left in regulation. Goals by Jonathan Ericsson and Dylan Larkin for the Red Wings made the score 4–3. Mantha then tied the game with 1.1 seconds remaining. The game-tying goal was reviewed to determine whether it beat the clock or there was goaltender interference, but it was upheld. Matthews then scored with 1:20 left in overtime to win the game.

Scoring summary
Period	Team	Goal	Assist(s)	Time	Score
1st	No scoring plays				
2nd	DET	Anthony Mantha (8)	Henrik Zetterberg (19), Tomas Tatar (8)	05:33	1–0 DET
3rd	TOR	Leo Komarov (6)	Jake Gardiner (13), William Nylander (17)	01:23	1–1
3rd	TOR	Mitch Marner (9)	Morgan Rielly (16), James van Riemsdyk (13)	08:23	2–1 TOR
3rd	TOR	Connor Brown (7)	Zach Hyman (10), Connor Carrick (3)	09:34	3–1 TOR
3rd	TOR	Auston Matthews (19)	Connor Brown (8), Zach Hyman (11)	12:05	4–1 TOR
3rd	DET	Jonathan Ericsson (1)	Anthony Mantha (7), Xavier Ouellet (4)	13:54	4–2 TOR
3rd	DET	Dylan Larkin (11)	Henrik Zetterberg (20), Tomas Tatar (9)	18:14	4–3 TOR
3rd	DET	Anthony Mantha (9)	Henrik Zetterberg (21), Thomas Vanek (14)	19:58	4–4
Overtime	TOR	Auston Matthews (20)	Jake Gardiner (14), Connor Brown (9)	03:40	5–4 TOR

Number in parentheses represents the player's total in goals or assists to that point of the season

Penalty summary
Period	Team	Player	Penalty	Time	PIM
1st	DET	Brendan Smith	Tripping	00:49	2:00
2nd	TOR	William Nylander	Holding the stick	01:26	2:00
2nd	TOR	Connor Brown	Hooking	05:51	2:00
2nd	DET	Nick Jensen	Holding	10:15	2:00
2nd	TOR	Team (served by Mitch Marner)	Too Many Men on Ice	11:35	2:00
3rd	DET	Steve Ott	Fighting	03:25	5:00
3rd	TOR	Matt Martin	Fighting	03:25	5:00
Overtime	No penalties				

Shots by period
Team	1	2	3	OT	Total
Detroit	9	9	17	2	37
Toronto	10	7	7	4	28

Power play opportunities
Team	Goals/Opportunities
Detroit	0/3
Toronto	0/2

Three star selections
	Team	Player	Statistics
1st	TOR	Auston Matthews	2 goals
2nd	TOR	Connor Brown	1 goal, 2 assists
3rd	DET	Anthony Mantha	2 goals, 1 assist

== Team rosters ==
Detroit Red Wings
#		Player	Position
2	(Canada)	Brendan Smith	D
3	(United States)	Nick Jensen	D
14	(Sweden)	Gustav Nyquist	C
15	(Canada)	Riley Sheahan	C
20	(United States)	Drew Miller	LW
21	(Slovakia)	Tomas Tatar	C
29	(Canada)	Steve Ott	C
31	(Canada)	Jared Coreau	G
34	(Czech Republic)	Petr Mrazek	G
39	(Canada)	Anthony Mantha	RW
40	(Sweden)	Henrik Zetterberg (C)	LW
41	(Canada)	Luke Glendening	C
51	(Denmark)	Frans Nielsen	C
52	(Sweden)	Jonathan Ericsson	D
55	(Sweden)	Niklas Kronwall (A)	D
61	(Canada)	Xavier Ouellet	D
62	(Austria)	Thomas Vanek	LW
65	(United States)	Danny DeKeyser	D
71	(United States)	Dylan Larkin	C
72	(Canada)	Andreas Athanasiou	C
Head coach: (United States) Jeff Blashill

Toronto Maple Leafs
#		Player	Position
2	(United States)	Matt Hunwick	D
8	(United States)	Connor Carrick	D
11	(Canada)	Zach Hyman	C
12	(Canada)	Connor Brown	RW
15	(Canada)	Matt Martin	LW
16	(Canada)	Mitch Marner	C
22	(Russia)	Nikita Zaitsev	D
25	(United States)	James van Riemsdyk	LW
26	(Russia)	Nikita Soshnikov	RW
29	(Sweden)	William Nylander	C
30	(Canada)	Antoine Bibeau	G
31	(Denmark)	Frederik Andersen	G
33	(Canada)	Frederick Gauthier	C
34	(United States)	Auston Matthews	C
42	(Canada)	Tyler Bozak (A)	C
43	(Canada)	Nazem Kadri	C
44	(Canada)	Morgan Rielly (A)	D
46	(Czech Republic)	Roman Polak	D
47	(Finland)	Leo Komarov (A)	C
51	(United States)	Jake Gardiner	D
Head coach: (Canada) Mike Babcock

Petr Mrazek and Antoine Bibeau dressed as the back-up goaltenders. Neither entered the game.

=== Scratches ===
- Detroit Red Wings: Tomas Jurco, Ryan Sproul
- Toronto Maple Leafs: Frank Corrado, Josh Leivo, Byron Froese

== Alumni game ==
The Rogers NHL Centennial Classic Alumni Game was held on December 31, and played between veteran players from both teams. The Red Wings Alumni defeated the Maple Leafs Alumni 4–3.

Toronto Maple Leafs anthem singer Martina Ortiz-Luis performed the national anthems. In the first period, goalie Mike Palmateer stopped Tomas Holmström on a penalty shot and left the game, playing just over two minutes of the game. The Red Wings Alumni lead the game 3–0 to almost the halfway point, with goals from Darren McCarty, Igor Larionov and Brendan Shanahan, but the Maple Leafs Alumni rallied to tie the game, with goals from Wendel Clark, Darcy Tucker and Tie Domi. As the intensity picked up near the end of the game, Gary Roberts and Kris Draper were noted to be somewhat aggressive with one another, despite the friendly atmosphere of the Alumni Game. Draper went on to score the winning goal controversially, with just over a minute left in regulation. The goal was disputed by the Leafs Alumni because the puck was tapped in by Draper on a rebound off a slapshot by Dino Ciccarelli. (Slapshots are customarily not taken in the Alumni Game.)

== Entertainment ==
During the first period intermission, Bryan Adams performed "Cuts Like a Knife", "You Belong to Me" and "Summer of '69". The Voice season 11 runner-up Billy Gilman performed the American national anthem while Canadian country singer Dean Brody performed the Canadian national anthem.

== See also ==
- List of outdoor ice hockey games
- Maple Leafs–Red Wings rivalry
