= 100 Greatest Hockey Players =

100 Greatest Hockey Players may refer to:

- The Hockey News#All-time NHL player rankings, a 1997 list published by The Hockey News and later expanded
- 100 Greatest NHL Players, a 2017 list published by the NHL to commemorate 100 years
