= Maple Leafs–Red Wings rivalry =

National Hockey League rivalry

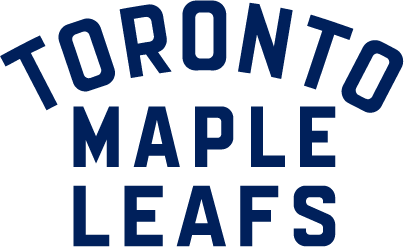
- Toronto Maple Leafs Detroit Red Wings
- First meeting: January 4, 1927
- Latest meeting: January 21, 2026
- Next meeting: December 22, 2026

Statistics
- Total meetings: 808
- All-time series: 361–346–93–8 (TOR)
- Regular season series: 303–287–93–8 (TOR)
- Postseason results: 59–58 (DET)
- Largest victory: 13–0 (TOR); January 2, 1971
- Longest win streak: TOR W9
- Current win streak: DET W4

Postseason history
- 1929 quarterfinals: Maple Leafs won, 2–0; 1934 semifinals: Red Wings won, 3–2; 1936 Stanley Cup Final: Red Wings won, 3–1; 1939 semifinals: Maple Leafs won, 2–1; 1940 semifinals: Maple Leafs won, 2–0; 1942 Stanley Cup Final: Maple Leafs won, 4–3; 1943 semifinals: Red Wings won, 4–2; 1945 Stanley Cup Final: Maple Leafs won, 4–3; 1947 semifinals: Maple Leafs won, 4–1; 1948 Stanley Cup Final: Maple Leafs won, 4–0; 1949 Stanley Cup Final: Maple Leafs won, 4–0; 1950 semifinals: Red Wings won, 4–3; 1952 semifinals: Red Wings won, 4–0; 1954 semifinals: Red Wings won, 4–1; 1955 semifinals: Red Wings won, 4–0; 1956 semifinals: Red Wings won, 4–1; 1960 semifinals: Maple Leafs won, 4–2; 1961 semifinals: Red Wings won, 4–1; 1963 Stanley Cup Final: Maple Leafs won, 4–1; 1964 Stanley Cup Final: Maple Leafs won, 4–3; 1987 division finals: Red Wings won, 4–3; 1988 division semifinals: Red Wings won, 4–2; 1993 division semifinals: Maple Leafs won, 4–3

The Maple Leafs–Red Wings rivalry is a National Hockey League (NHL) rivalry between the Toronto Maple Leafs and the Detroit Red Wings. The rivalry is largely bolstered because of the proximity between the two teams, with Toronto and Detroit approximately 370 kilometres (230 mi) apart, connected by Ontario Highway 401, and a number of shared fans in between the two cities (particularly in markets such as London, Sarnia, and Windsor).

Both teams are Original Six teams, with their first game played in Detroit's inaugural season in 1926–27. From 1929 to 1993, the two teams met each other in 16 playoff series and seven Stanley Cup Final series for a combined 23 times in the postseason. Toronto has won 12 of these series. Only the Bruins and Canadiens have played more postseason series with one another.

== Foundation: 1927–42 ==
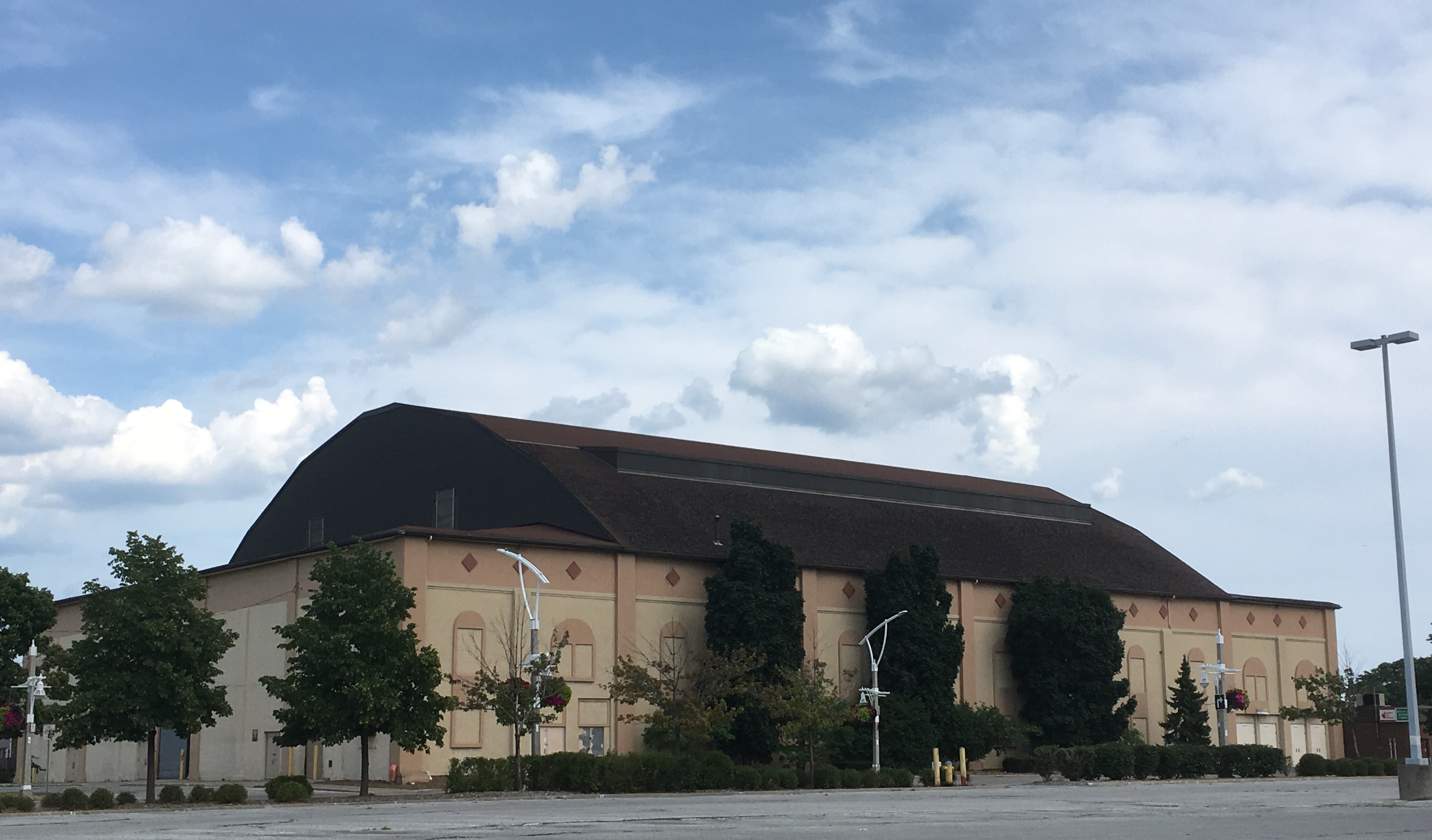
The Windsor Arena (formerly Border City Arena) hosted the first game between Detroit and Toronto, as Detroit's home arena was still under construction.

The series began on January 4, 1927, when the Toronto St. Patricks (renamed Maple Leafs the next month) met the Detroit Cougars (renamed Red Wings in 1932) for the first time. In the matchup, the St. Patricks earned a 2–1 victory against the Cougars at the Border Cities Arena (later renamed Windsor Arena) in Windsor Ontario. The Cougars played their home games in Windsor for the 1926–27 NHL season while their home arena, Olympia Stadium, was under construction.

The Cougars played their first Stanley Cup playoff series against the Maple Leafs following the 1928–29 NHL season. The Maple Leafs won the series 2–0. The club scored in double digits for the first time in its history against the Maple Leafs, in a 10–1 rout at Olympia Stadium on December 25, 1930. The Maple Leafs recorded their own franchise record shutout on January 2, 1971, when the Maple Leafs shut out the Red Wings 13–0 at Maple Leaf Gardens. Both games would be the largest goal differential each team recorded on each other.

The Red Wings won their first Stanley Cup in 1936, after defeating the Maple Leafs at Maple Leaf Gardens. However, the Maple Leafs won the next six Cup Final played between the two teams.

=== 1940 Stanley Cup playoff brawl ===
The 1940 semifinals between the Maple Leafs and Red Wings was especially notable with the second game evolving into a brawl. The tone of the game was set early when Maple Leafs' defenceman, Rudolph Kampman, injured Red Wings' forward Cecil Dillon who became unable to play the rest of the night. In the second period, Maple Leafs' Red Horner and Red Wings' Alex Motter fought on the ice and continued to do so in the penalty box with local police called in to break it up. Later in the same frame, Red Wings' Don Grosso lifted Maple Leafs' Hank Goldup over the boards, dropping him on the cement floor. Goldup had to be assisted off the ice.

Near the end of the third period, Sid Abel scored for the Red Wings to narrow the Maple Leafs' lead to 3–1. However, a melee erupted when Abel and Maple Leafs' Gus Marker engaged one another. Within an instant, every player on the ice engaged an opponent in a fight, with players from both benches going over the boards to join them. The brawl lasted for more than 10 minutes with the last two engaged players being Jimmy Orlando and Horner. When peace was restored, the referee assessed majors and misconducts to Gus Marker and Abel, a major to Orlando, and a misconduct to Horner, who left the penalty box to join the altercation. At the games conclusion, Red Wings' coach Jack Adams had his own altercation. As the Red Wings headed toward their own dressing room, a fan attempted to assault Adams before he punched the fan himself.

== Original Six era: 1942–67 ==
The rivalry between the Maple Leafs and Red Wings was at its height during the Original Six-era (1942–67), with the majority of Maple Leafs and Red Wings postseason meetings occurring in this period. The Maple Leafs and Red Wings met in the postseason six times during the 1940s, including four Stanley Cup Final. The Maple Leafs beat the Red Wings in five of their six meetings, except in the 1943 semifinals. In the 1950s, the Maple Leafs and Red Wings met one another in six Stanley Cup semifinals; the Red Wings beat the Maple Leafs in five of their six meetings, excluding the 1960 semifinals. From 1961 to 1967, the two teams met one another in three playoff series, including two Stanley Cup Final. Within those 25 years, the Maple Leafs and Red Wings played a total of 15 postseason series including six Cup Final; the Maple Leafs beat the Red Wings in all six Cup Final.

=== 1942 Stanley Cup Final ===
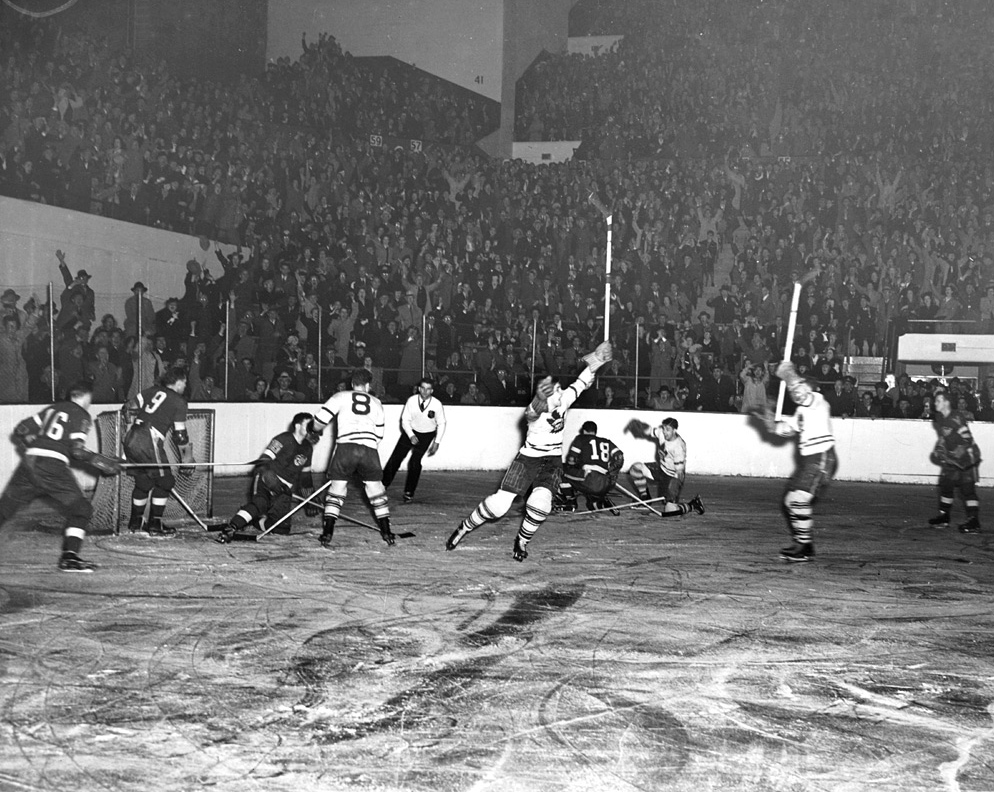
Maple Leafs score on the Red Wings during the 1942 Stanley Cup Final.

The rivalry intensified in the 1942 Stanley Cup Final. After losing the first three games, the Maple Leafs won the next four to win the series 4–3, winning their fourth Stanley Cup. It was the first Cup Final in history to go seven games, and the only time in North American sports that a team won a best-of-seven championship series, after losing the first three games. There were several tense moments throughout the series.

In the fourth game, held in Detroit, the Maple Leafs staved off elimination with a 4–3 victory. The game ended in a near-riot when in the final minute, Red Wings' Eddie Wares drew a misconduct penalty and then a $50 fine for arguing and refusing to leave the ice. Referee Mel Harwood dropped the puck for the faceoff while Wares was still on the ice and he promptly called a too-many-men penalty on Don Grosso. Grosso threw down his stick and gloves and was fined $25 by Harwood. At the end of the game, Red Wings' coach Jack Adams attacked Harwood, punching him in the face following a profanity-laced outburst. The fans booed the officiating, littering the ice with paper, peanuts, and even a woman's shoe. NHL president Frank Calder and referee Harwood were escorted out of the rink under police protection. Calder immediately suspended Adams indefinitely and imposed $100 fines on Grosso and Wares.

Game seven of the series was the first time a crowd of over 16,000 attended a hockey game in Canada. 16,218 fans squeezed into Maple Leaf Gardens and remained an hour after the game waiting for the Leafs to reappear from the dressing room. Coach Hap Day, who played for the Leafs in their last Stanley Cup win in 1932, deadpanned "We won it the hard way." He was asked if he had any doubts during the series, and replied "I had my doubts right up until that final bell rang." Rookie Gaye Stewart, who joined the club for the fifth game of the final, became the youngest player to win the Stanley Cup at the age of 18 years, and nine months. (Note: Larry Hillman later became the youngest player to win a Stanley Cup, winning the 1955 Stanley Cup Final with the Detroit Red Wings at the age of 18 years, and 2 months.)

=== 1945 Stanley Cup Final ===
The Maple Leafs and Red Wings met in their third Cup Final series in 1945. This series was the first Cup Final in NHL history where both teams started rookie goaltenders. In the first three games, Maple Leafs goaltender, Frank McCool did not allow the Red Wings to score a single goal. This was the first time one team shut out the other for the first three games in Stanley Cup Final history. In addition, the Maple Leafs now stood one win away from sweeping the Red Wings, as the Red Wings' Mud Bruneteau noted after game three. However, the series played out similarly to the last time the two teams met in the Final, in 1942, when the Maple Leafs, down 0–3 forced a seventh game, this time with Detroit winning the next three games to force a seventh game.

In game four, the Maple Leafs had a chance to win the Cup at home, but the Red Wings got on the board for the first time in the series when Flash Hollett opened the scoring 8:35 into the game, ending McCool's shutout streak at 193:09 (dating back to the semifinals against Montreal). Four other Red Wings players, including rookie Ted Lindsay (who scored what transpired to be the game-winner at 3:20 of the third period), scored to overcome Ted Kennedy's hat trick. Games five and six were Harry Lumley's time to shine, shutting out the Leafs, including an overtime shutout in the sixth game, and extending the Final. The series returned to Detroit for a seventh game, with the Red Wings hoping to avenge their "choking" against the Leafs in 1942.

Maple Leafs' coach Hap Day almost had to eat his words of a few years back when he said of the Leafs' 1942 comeback from being down 3–0 in games, "There will never be another experience like this." Babe Pratt, however, scored the winning goal in a 2–1 victory that saved the Maple Leafs from being victim of another comeback win by the Red Wings. Lumley left the ice almost immediately after the end of the game, but a Detroit Olympia crowd chant of "We want Lumley!" brought him back. This is the first time in the history of game sevens of the Stanley Cup Final that the home team did not win. The home team did not lose a game seven final again until the Montreal Canadiens beat the Chicago Black Hawks in 1971.

=== 1950s and 1960s ===
By 1950, the two teams met one another 11 times in the postseason. The rivalry heightened to a fever pitch due to an incident in the 1950 playoffs when the Red Wings' young star, Gordie Howe, mistimed a check on Maple Leafs' Ted Kennedy and fell head-first into the boards, suffering severe injuries and needing emergency surgery to save his life. While Kennedy was exonerated by the NHL, Red Wings' management and fans accused him of deliberately injuring Howe. The result was a violent playoff series won by the Red Wings and increased animosity between the teams.

Toronto had won the Cup in 1947, 1948, and 1949 but in the 1950 playoffs, the Red Wings and Maple Leafs battled into a second overtime in game four tied 1–1. Then Leo Reise Jr. fired a shot towards the Maple Leafs net only 38 seconds into the period. Reise's shot glanced off Toronto defenceman Gus Mortson and past Turk Broda for the game-winning goal. The series was tied 2–2. Once again, in game seven, the Red Wings and Maple Leafs battled into overtime. After eight minutes of heart-throbbing action in overtime, the puck skimmed into the Maple Leafs end, eventually finding its way to Reise's stick at the blue line. His shot was not particularly hard, but it had eyes, passing one player after another. Broda never saw the screened shot until it hit the net and bounced out between his feet. The chance of a fourth straight Cup win was lost. The most unlikely of Stanley Cup playoff heroes, defenceman Reise, had done it again, and the Red Wings advanced to win the Cup. The rivalry grew so fierce that when the New York Rangers reached the 1950 Stanley Cup Final to face the Red Wings, but could not play in their home rink, Madison Square Garden, because the Ringling Bros. and Barnum & Bailey Circus were using the arena, New York arranged to play home games in Toronto, whose fans held a deep enmity against the Red Wings.

In the 1956 semifinals series between the Maple Leafs and the Red Wings, an anonymous caller to a Toronto newspaper claimed he would shoot Red Wings' stars Howe and Lindsay when they took the ice at Maple Leaf Gardens for game three. Howe and Lindsay combined for three goals in Detroit's 5–4 win, with Lindsay turning his stick like a rifle, pointing it at the Toronto crowd, circling the rink while making machine gun noises. The Red Wings would win the semifinals series 4–1.

The rivalry further intensified in the 1950s when relations between Red Wings star Red Kelly and Red Wings General Manager Jack Adams had deteriorated. Angered over a magazine article where Kelly had suggested the Red Wings forced him to play with a broken ankle in the 1958–59 NHL season, Adams traded the all-star to the Maple Leafs. When the Maple Leafs eliminated the Red Wings in the 1960 playoffs, Kelly couldn't resist another jab at Adams, telling the Ottawa Journal "it's nice to be with a winner."

The teams met in two Cup Final in 1963 and 1964. The 1964 Cup Final became well known because of the heroics of Leafs defenceman Bobby Baun. In game six, he was taken off the ice with an injury that later would be diagnosed as a broken leg. Baun eventually returned to the game and scored the overtime winner to even the series at 3–3. The Leafs went on to win game seven and win the Cup, part in thanks to Baun's unlikely heroics earlier in the series.

== Expansion era: 1968–1998 ==
On March 27, 1973, Mickey Redmond scored two goals on Maple Leafs goaltender Ron Low in a span of 18 seconds to become the Red Wings' first ever 50-goal scorer in an 8–1 victory. On November 5, 1975, in one of the most horrifying incidents to ever take place at Maple Leaf Gardens, Red Wings forward, Dan Maloney, repeatedly beat Maple Leafs defenceman Brian Glennie's head off the ice until he went limp. Maloney was charged with assault causing bodily harm, part of a crackdown on hockey violence by Ontario attorney general Roy McMurtry. A plea bargain left Maloney performing community service work while being banned from playing in Toronto for two years. Ironically, Maloney subsequently played for the Maple Leafs from 1977 to 1982, then served as their head coach from 1984 to 1986.

On January 13, 1986, the Maple Leafs and Red Wings played a regular season game that involved a brawl lasting nearly 20 minutes. After the Leafs scored their sixth goal, the Red Wings' head coach, Brad Park, sent his players over the boards, and Leafs head coach Dan Maloney followed suit. During the brawl Maple Leafs assistant coach John Brophy attempted to engage Park, although he was held back by the usher. By the games conclusion, the Maple Leafs won 7–4, and over 281 minutes in penalties was assessed, with 171 minutes from the third-period brawl alone. Red Wings enforcer, Bob Probert, was issued a four-game suspension for head-butting, while Lane Lambert was given a three-game suspension for being the first Red Wing to leave the bench and instigate the brawl.

Since the end of the Original Six-era, the Maple Leafs and Red Wings have met other only three times in the postseason. In those three series, the Red Wings beat the Maple Leafs twice, in the 1987 Norris Division finals and 1988 Norris Division semifinals. The Maple Leafs beat the Red Wings in the most recent series they played one another, the 1993 Norris Division semifinals. In the seventh game of the 1993 Norris Division semifinals, Maple Leafs' Nikolai Borschevsky's shot the game-winner in overtime past Red Wings goaltender Tim Cheveldae hushing the fans inside Joe Louis Arena. The goal gave the underdog Leafs a shocking first-round series victory over Steve Yzerman's heavily favoured Red Wings. Borschevsky's game seven overtime goal gave Toronto the series and made them the sixth club to eliminate a team with a better regular season record in the first round of the playoffs. This was also the Maple Leafs' first playoff series win against the Red Wings since the 1964 Cup Final.

== Stagnation and the modern era: 1998–present ==
The rivalry stagnated during the mid-1990s and 2000s, when the Maple Leafs moved from the Western Conference (formerly the Clarence Campbell Conference), to the Eastern Conference (formerly the Prince of Wales Conference) to begin the 1998–99 NHL season, leaving the Maple Leafs and Red Wings in separate conferences for 15 years. Because of NHL scheduling for interconference play, the Maple Leafs and Red Wings played one another as little as once a year. The two teams returned to the same division prior to the 2013–14 NHL season with the Red Wings moving to the Eastern Conference and being placed in the new Atlantic Division of which the Maple Leafs were located.

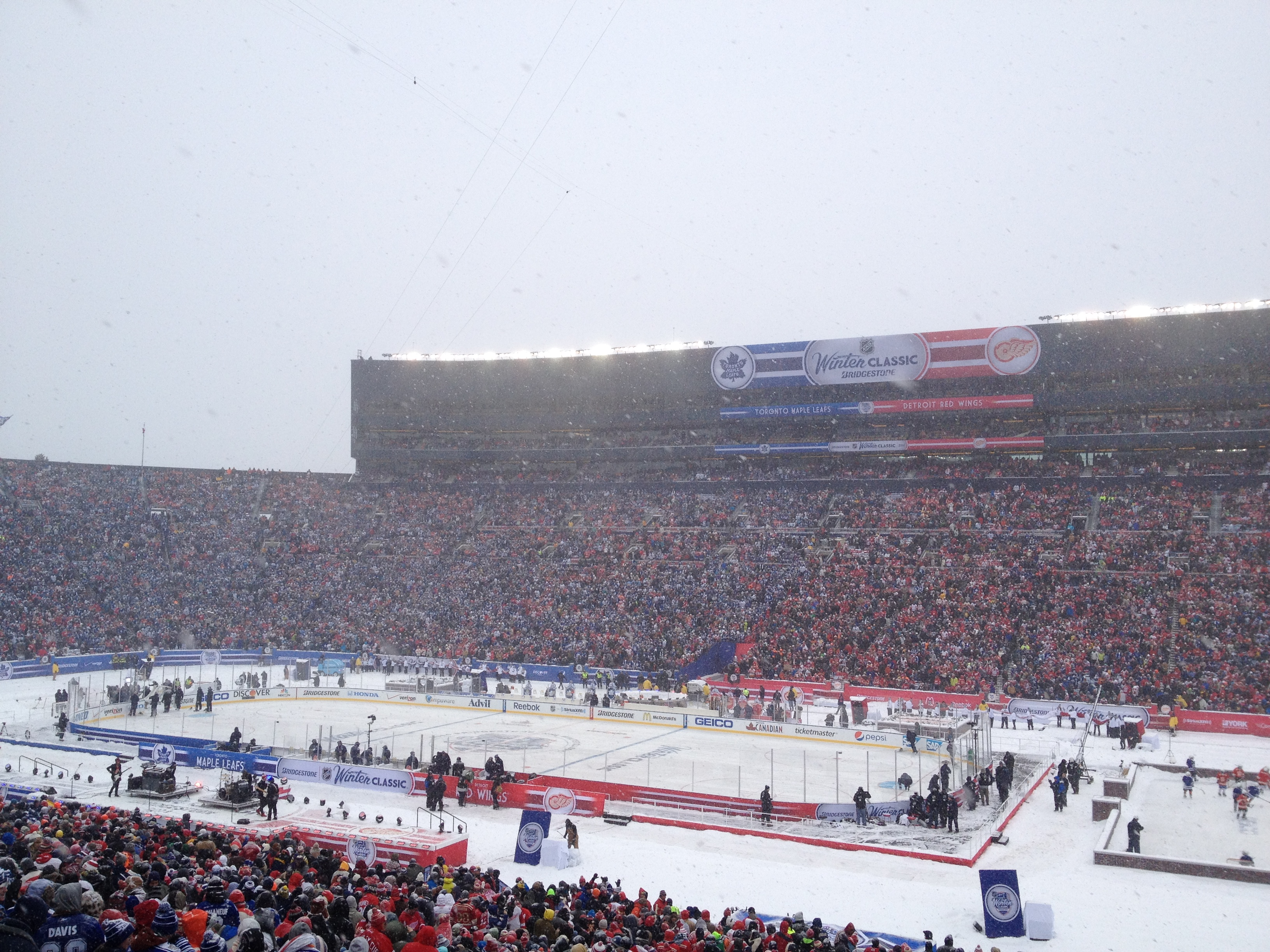
The Maple Leafs and Red Wings played each other in the 2014 NHL Winter Classic.

Playing in the same division for the first time since 1998, the Red Wings hosted the Maple Leafs for the 2014 NHL Winter Classic at Michigan Stadium in Ann Arbor. In front of an NHL record crowd of 105,491, and the largest Canadian and American television audiences for a regular season game in NHL history, the Maple Leafs beat the Red Wings 3–2 in a shootout.

A rematch of the 2014 NHL Winter Classic was held on January 1, 2017, the NHL Centennial Classic at BMO Field in Toronto to commemorate the Maple Leafs' and the NHL's 100th season. Once again, the Maple Leafs beat the Red Wings, winning 5–4 after an overtime goal by Auston Matthews.

Due to COVID-19 cross-border travel restrictions imposed by the Government of Canada, the NHL temporarily realigned its divisions for the 2020–21 season, restricting its regular season games between teams from the same division. As the realignment placed the Maple Leafs and Red Wings in different divisions, the two teams did not play one another that season.

== See also ==
- List of NHL rivalries
