= Bruins–Maple Leafs rivalry =

National Hockey League rivalry

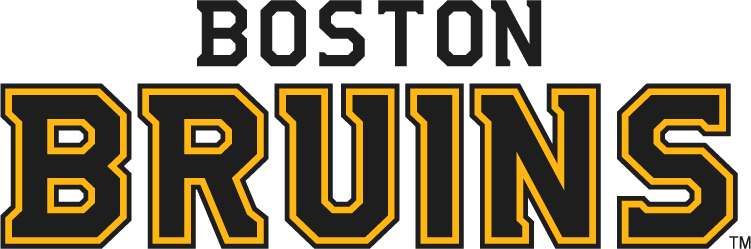
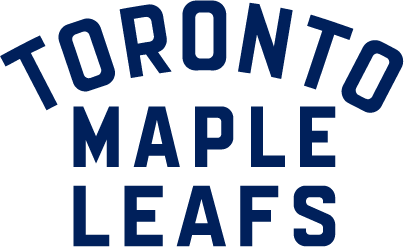
- Boston Bruins Toronto Maple Leafs
- First meeting: December 3, 1924
- Latest meeting: March 24, 2026
- Next meeting: November 27, 2026

Statistics
- Total meetings: 785
- All-time series: 357–315–99–14 (BOS)
- Regular season series: 311–272–98–14 (BOS)
- Postseason results: 46–43–1 (BOS)
- Largest victory: 11–0 (BOS); January 18, 1964
- Longest win streak: BOS W8
- Current win streak: TOR W1

Postseason history
- 1933 semifinals: Maple Leafs won, 3–2; 1935 semifinals: Maple Leafs won, 3–1; 1936 quarterfinals: Maple Leafs won, 1–1 (8–6 aggregate goals); 1938 semifinals: Maple Leafs won, 3–0; 1939 Stanley Cup Final: Bruins won, 4–1; 1941 semifinals: Bruins won, 4–3; 1948 semifinals: Maple Leafs won, 4–1; 1949 semifinals: Maple Leafs won, 4–1; 1951 semifinals: Maple Leafs won, 4–1–1; 1959 semifinals: Maple Leafs won, 4–3; 1969 quarterfinals: Bruins won, 4–0; 1972 quarterfinals: Bruins won, 4–1; 1974 quarterfinals: Bruins won, 4–0; 2013 conference quarterfinals: Bruins won, 4–3; 2018 first round: Bruins won, 4–3; 2019 first round: Bruins won, 4–3; 2024 first round: Bruins won, 4–3

The Bruins–Maple Leafs rivalry is a National Hockey League (NHL) rivalry between the Boston Bruins and the Toronto Maple Leafs. Both teams compete in the Atlantic Division and with current NHL scheduling, they meet four times per season.

Both teams are Original Six teams, with their first game played in Boston's inaugural season in 1924. Boston has won nine of 17 postseason series against Toronto, having won all seven playoff meetings that occurred since NHL's 1967 expansion.

Toronto and Boston are also division rivals in the other two professional leagues in which both cities have teams (Major League Baseball and the National Basketball Association). No other pair of Canadian and U.S. cities has three division rivalries.

== Foundation ==
The series began on December 3, 1924, when the Toronto St. Patricks (renamed Maple Leafs in 1927) met the Boston Bruins for the first time. In the match-up, the St. Patricks earned a 5–3 victory against the Bruins at Mutual Street Arena. The Bruins played their first Stanley Cup playoff series against the Maple Leafs following the 1932–33 NHL season. The Maple Leafs won the series 3–2.

On December 12, 1933, Maple Leaf Ace Bailey's career came to an abrupt end when he was hit from behind by Eddie Shore of the Bruins, and hit his head on the ice, fracturing his skull; he convulsed on the ice of the Boston Garden. This occurred after Maple Leafs teammate King Clancy upended Shore with a hard check as the later player rushed up the ice. Angry, dazed, and thinking he was going after Clancy, Shore rushed at Bailey intent on revenge. Another teammate, Red Horner knocked Shore out cold with one punch after the incident. It was feared that Bailey would not survive after severely injuring his head. He came out of a coma for the second time 10 days later, making a full recovery, but did not play professionally again. When he was assured that Bailey would survive, league president Frank Calder suspended Shore for 16 games. An all-star benefit game was held at Maple Leaf Gardens on February 14, 1934, which raised $20,909 for Bailey and his family. Bailey and Shore shook hands and embraced at centre ice before the game began. Thirteen years later, the NHL introduced an annual all-star game.

== 1960s, 70s and 80s ==
On January 18, 1964, the defending Stanley Cup champion Maple Leafs lost in Toronto to the last-place Bruins by an 11–0 margin—the largest win of the rivalry and still the most lopsided shutout ever recorded against the Leafs.

The 1969 playoffs saw a four-game sweep by the Bruins. Game one at the Boston Garden was a 10–0 blowout, where Maple Leafs defenceman Pat Quinn bodychecked the Bruins' Bobby Orr in open-ice, knocking him out and leading to a bench-clearing brawl. The Maple Leafs Forbes Kennedy set records for most penalties in a game (eight), most penalty minutes (38, since bettered), most penalties in a period (six) and most penalty minutes in a period (34).

On February 7, 1976 in a game between Toronto and Boston at Maple Leaf Gardens, Maple Leafs centre Darryl Sittler set an NHL record that still stands by tallying 10 points (6 goals and 4 assists). All his points were scored against rookie goalie Dave Reece in an 11–4 Maple Leafs victory.

On December 30, 1989, the Maple Leafs staged their largest comeback for a win in their team history. The Maple Leafs were down 6–1 to the Bruins, coming back with six unanswered goals to defeat the Bruins 7–6 in overtime. After Mark Osborne had scored the early Leafs goal, the six-goal run was led by two from Eddie Olczyk and a goal each from Vincent Damphousse, Luke Richardson and Gary Leeman, and the overtime winner by Wendel Clark.

== 2000s and 2010s ==
The Maple Leafs had drafted goaltender Tuukka Rask in the first round, 21st overall, in the 2005 NHL entry draft. However, before playing a regular season game for Toronto, he was traded to the Bruins in exchange for former Calder Memorial Trophy-winning goaltender Andrew Raycroft. Toronto management had deemed Justin Pogge their potential goaltender of the future, rendering Rask expendable. It was later revealed the Bruins intended to release Raycroft, which would have made him available to Toronto without having to give up Rask. The trade has since been examined as one of the worst trades in Maple Leafs franchise history; Rask experienced many seasons of success with the Bruins, eventually winning the Stanley Cup and Vezina Trophy, while Raycroft only played two seasons for Toronto, recording disappointing statistics in the process, and Pogge would only ever play seven regular season games for the Maple Leafs, totaling one win and five losses with a save percentage of 0.895% in the 2008-–09 season.

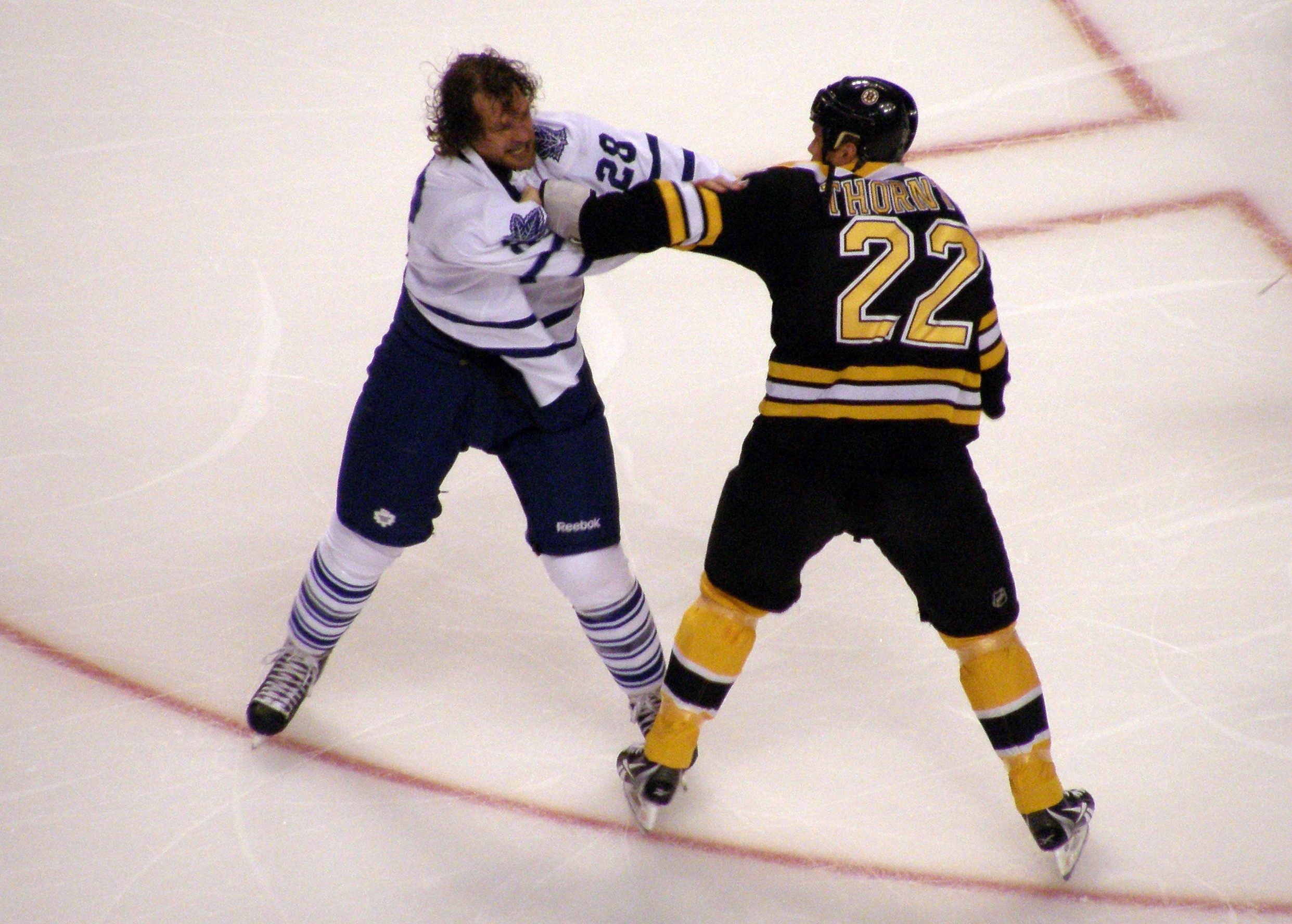
Maple Leafs' Colton Orr and Bruins' Shawn Thornton fight during a game between the two teams in October 2011

The rivalry was renewed in the 2013 Stanley Cup playoffs. On May 13, 2013, game seven was played at TD Garden. The Bruins rallied from a 4–1 third period deficit to defeat the Maple Leafs in overtime, 5–4, and advance to the second round. Boston jumped to a 3–1 lead in the series before Toronto won two straight games to force game seven. David Krejčí led Boston to a 4–1 victory in game one with a goal and two assists. Joffrey Lupul then scored two goals to lead the Maple Leafs to a 4–2 victory in game two. The Bruins then took game three, 5–2, aided by goalie Tuukka Rask's 45 saves out of 47 shots. Krejčí's goal at 13:06 of overtime then gave Boston the win in game four, 4–3. But the Leafs bounced back in game five with a 2–1 victory, behind James Reimer's 43 saves. Reimer then stopped 29 of 30 shots in Toronto's 2–1 win in game six. In game seven, the Maple Leafs jumped to a 4–1 lead in the third period, aided by two goals by Cody Franson. However, the Bruins began their comeback with Nathan Horton's goal at 09:18. Then, after pulling goalie Rask to add an extra attacker, Boston scored twice within the last two minutes of regulation to tie the game, first with Milan Lucic's score at 18:38, and then Patrice Bergeron's goal at 19:09. Bergeron then scored at 6:05 in overtime to give the Bruins the 5–4 win and the series, en route to the Stanley Cup Final. It was the first game seven in NHL playoff history in which a team trailing by three goals in the third period won the game and, therefore, the series.

In the 2018 Stanley Cup playoffs, the Bruins again defeated the Maple Leafs in seven games. Rask made 26 saves for the Bruins in game one, winning the game 5–1. During the game, Maple Leafs forward Nazem Kadri was given a five-minute major penalty and game misconduct for charging Tommy Wingels; he was later suspended for three games. David Pastrňák had a hat trick and three assists in a 7–3 victory for the Bruins in game two, becoming the first player since Claude Giroux in 2012 to score a hat trick and three assists. In game three, Patrick Marleau scored twice for the Maple Leafs in a 4–2 victory. Pastrňák assisted twice on two goals in a 3–1 triumph for the Bruins, taking a 3–1 series lead in the process. In game five, Toronto prevented a come-back by Boston, fending off the Bruins 4–3 as Frederik Andersen made 42 saves for the Maple Leafs. Nikita Zaitsev assisted twice in a 3–1 Maple Leafs victory, forcing a deciding game seven on April 25. In game seven, Bruins forward Patrice Bergeron scored a goal and recorded two assists in a 7–4 victory to advance his team to the second round.

In 2019, for the third time in the span of six years, the Bruins again defeated Maple Leafs in seven games. Mitch Marner scored twice in Toronto's game one victory, who outscored Boston 4–1. Game two saw controversy in officiating with Bruins players becoming more physical including to the point where Boston forward Jake DeBrusk collided with Toronto forward Nazem Kadri, who was skating hard out of the penalty box, resulting in a knee-on-knee collision injuring the Maple Leafs forward. No penalty was called on the play. Kadri returned to the game but retaliated against DeBrusk later cross-checking the forward in the head, resulting in a major penalty and game misconduct for the Toronto forward. Kadri was later suspended for the remainder of the series. The Bruins ended the game 4–1. In game three, both Auston Matthews and Andreas Johnsson scored a goal and notched an assist, leading the Maple Leafs to a 3–2 victory. In game four, the Bruins held onto a 6–4 victory keeping the Maple Leafs from tying in the dying minutes after leading by three goals in the third period. The Maple Leafs scored twice in the third period of game five and held onto a one-goal lead late in the game to give Toronto a 2–1 victory and a 3–2 series lead. In game six, Brad Marchand had two goals and an assist in a 4–2 Bruins victory to push the series to a seventh game. In the seventh game, Rask made 32 saves to defeat the Maple Leafs 5–1 and advance to the second round, en route to the Stanley Cup Final.

== 2020s ==
Due to COVID-19 cross-border travel restrictions imposed by the Government of Canada, the NHL temporarily realigned its divisions for the 2020–21 season, restricting its regular season games between teams from the same division. As the realignment placed the Maple Leafs and Bruins in different divisions, the two teams were not scheduled to play one another for that season.

The two teams met again in the first round of the 2024 playoffs, and the Bruins won the series in seven games.
