= Original Six =

Group of National Hockey League teams

Map of the Original Six cities.

The Original Six (French: six équipes originales) are the teams that composed the National Hockey League (NHL) between 1942 and 1967. The six teams are the Boston Bruins, Chicago Black Hawks, (Note: The Chicago team used the two words "Black Hawks" throughout the Original Six period, changing it to "Blackhawks" after the 1985–86 season.) Detroit Red Wings, Montreal Canadiens, New York Rangers, and Toronto Maple Leafs. After serving as the league's only teams for 25 seasons, they were joined by six new franchises in the 1967 NHL expansion.

Despite the moniker, the Six are not the original teams of the NHL. The Canadiens and Maple Leafs are the two members of this group that are charter members (1917–18 season) of the NHL. However, in addition to the 25 seasons as the only teams, the Original Six all date back to the league's first decade. They are thus the NHL's oldest active franchises by a margin of at least 41 seasons versus any other team.

The Original Six have the most combined Stanley Cup titles among NHL franchises; the Canadiens hold the most wins at 24. The Maple Leafs, who won the last Stanley Cup of the Original Six era, are the only Original Six franchise to have not returned to the Stanley Cup Final, let alone win the Cup, since the 1967 expansion. As of completion of the 2026 Stanley Cup Final, the other five Original Six teams have won 21 of the 58 Stanley Cup championships since the 1967 expansion.

== Teams ==
Team name	Location	Founded	Stanley Cups (1942–1967)	Stanley Cups (total)
Montreal Canadiens	Montreal, Quebec	1909 (joined NHL in 1917)	10	24
Toronto Maple Leafs	Toronto, Ontario	1917	9	13
Boston Bruins	Boston, Massachusetts	1924	0	6
Chicago Black Hawks	Chicago, Illinois	1926	1	6
Detroit Red Wings	Detroit, Michigan	1926	5	11
New York Rangers	New York City, New York	1926	0	4

== Background ==
The NHL consisted of 10 teams during the 1920s, but the league experienced a period of retrenchment during the Great Depression, losing the Pittsburgh Pirates/Philadelphia Quakers, Ottawa Senators/St. Louis Eagles, and Montreal Maroons in succession to financial pressures. The New York/Brooklyn Americans, one of the league's original expansion franchises, along with the Bruins and Maroons, lasted longer but played as wards of the league from 1936 onward. World War II and its own economic strains severely depleted the league's Canadian player base since Canada entered the war in September 1939, and many players left for military service. The Americans suspended operations in the fall of 1942, which left the NHL with just six teams.

Despite various outside efforts to initiate expansion after the war, including attempted revivals of the Maroons and Americans franchises, the league's membership remained at six teams for the next 25 seasons. This was the longest static period without expansion, team moves or contraction in the history of the league, and also featured the longest period without any team changing arenas. The next longest streak, from the 2000 expansion to Saint Paul, Minnesota, and Columbus, Ohio, to the 2011 move of the Atlanta Thrashers to Winnipeg, is not even half as long; only two other periods (1982–1991 and 2011–2017) lasted longer than five seasons. The 25 seasons is also the second-longest period without expansion, team moves or contraction in North American sports history, behind only Major League Baseball (MLB). In 1903, the original Baltimore Orioles disbanded, and the New York Highlanders (now Yankees) took their place. No other MLB teams moved or disbanded until the Boston Braves moved to Milwaukee in 1953, a span of 50 seasons with only stadium changes or rebrands.

== Criticisms ==
The Original Six era has been criticized for having a playoff format that was too easy, since the top four teams in the regular season advanced to the playoffs. At least, the playoff system was too easy for the three strongest teams of the era: Montreal, Toronto, and Detroit. The standings were very static. Montreal missed the playoffs only once between 1943 and 1967 (in 1948), while Detroit missed three times and Toronto missed four times. Usually, this left the Black Hawks, Bruins, and Rangers to compete for the final playoff berth. Montreal won 10 of the 25 Stanley Cup titles awarded during the Original Six era, Toronto won nine, and Detroit won five. The only other Original Six member to win the Cup during that era was Chicago (in 1961).

It was not a coincidence that two of the dominant teams were based in Canada, and the third, Detroit, borders Canada. The league had a rule that gave each team exclusive rights to negotiate contracts with promising local players within 50 miles (80 kilometres) of its home ice. A player who was not within the 50-mile limit was free to field offers from any team. Once a player agreed to an NHL sponsorship-level contract, the NHL club could assign him to its sponsored junior squad, its "sponsorship list."

Since the Toronto and the Montreal metropolitan areas contained abundant ice hockey prospects, that put them at a major recruiting advantage over Boston, New York, and Chicago, which had very few such prospects in their territories. Detroit claimed the less-populated Southwestern Ontario as part of its territory and so did not have the major advantage of the Canadian teams. However, it was better positioned than the other American ones.

In practice, all six teams recruited players from Canada by sponsoring minor league, junior, and amateur teams. As a result, the league was almost entirely composed of Canadians, who had come up through the junior and minor professional leagues. The league boasted a small amount of good American players during the 1940s including the All-Star goalkeepers Frank Brimsek and Mike Karakas, defenceman John Mariucci, and forward Cully Dahlstrom. At the beginning of the Original Six era, the Chicago Black Hawks were owned by Major Frederic McLaughlin, a fiercely patriotic man who tried to stock his roster with as many American players as possible. However, he died in 1944, and his estate sold the team to a group controlled by the Norris family, which also owned the Red Wings. After that time, the Black Hawks had only a few American-born players just like the other American-based teams, while the Canadian teams had very few. The only American-born Maple Leafs player during the entire era was Gerry Foley, who was born in Ware, Massachusetts, but grew up in Garson, Ontario, and played just four games for Toronto, although he played two full seasons for the New York Rangers. The Canadiens' only American-born skater was Norm Dussault, a forward who was born in Springfield, Massachusetts, but grew up in Sherbrooke, Quebec. An American goaltender, John Aiken, also played exactly half a game for Montreal on March 13, 1958; he was a Boston Bruins team employee who filled in for his team's opponent as an emergency replacement when Jacques Plante was injured during the second period of a game at the Boston Garden. The family of the Detroit-born Charlie Burns moved to Toronto when he was a child; he was a four-year regular with Detroit and Boston from 1958 to 1963.

Very few American-developed NHL players emerged in the 1950s and 1960s. Tommy Williams was the only U.S. citizen to play regularly. Both Williams and Mariucci complained about anti-American bias, and U.S. Olympic team stars John Mayasich and Bill Cleary turned down offers from NHL teams. Although there were several European-born players (such as the Slovak-born Hall of Famer Stan Mikita), who immigrated to Canada as children, the only European-born and trained player of the era was Sweden's Ulf Sterner, who briefly played for the Rangers in 1965. The league's first black player, Willie O'Ree, came up during that era; he played for the Bruins between 1958 and 1961 but turned out to be the only black player until the 1970s.

After World War II, all six NHL owners consistently rejected any bids for expansion, namely a bid for the American Hockey League's Cleveland Barons team in 1952. In the eyes of many observers, the criteria for entry were changed every time with a desire to defeat any such bid. The owners also reneged on promises to allow the extant but dormant Maroons and Americans franchises to reactivate.

Those phenomena had the impact of limiting player movement, and as a result, the Original Six rosters were very static. Until the lengthening of careers in the 1980s, only one 20-year player in NHL history, Larry Robinson, started his career after 1964, and it is generally accepted that the weakest Calder Trophy winners (rookies of the year) of all time were selected in the 1950s and the 1960s.

== Corruption ==
The league tolerated monopolistic practices by the owners. At one point, for instance, Red Wings owner James E. Norris effectively owned the Black Hawks as well and was also the largest stockholder in the Rangers. He also had significant influence over the Bruins by way of mortgages extended to the team to help keep it afloat during the Great Depression, which led some critics to joke that NHL stood for "Norris House League."

The control of owners over their teams was absolute, with poor labour conditions for the players. Whenever players were sent to the minors, they had their salaries cut, and their relocation costs were not covered. Players were signed by a team as early as 16, and they were then owned by that team for their entire careers, which then directed their development.

A player pension plan had been formed in 1946, but the financials were kept a secret from the players, who had to accept whatever pension payments the owners unilaterally decided. The stark labor conditions led to several players' disputes, including a 1957 antitrust action and attempted union formation; the owners' control was further visible when four-time Stanley Cup champion and Red Wings forward Ted Lindsay, a main force agitating for a players' union in 1957, was sent to the last-place Black Hawks. Subsequent actions in the early 1960s by Toronto players Bob Baun and Carl Brewer finally led to the 1967 formation of the National Hockey League Players' Association (NHLPA), though inaugural NHLPA executive director Alan Eagleson continued to obfuscate the pension's financials while he skimmed money from the plan, exposed only in 1989.

== End of era ==
As the more conservative owners left the NHL, a younger guard that was more receptive to expansion entered the league. By 1963, when Rangers governor William M. Jennings first introduced to his peers the idea of expanding the NHL, Major League Baseball (MLB) and the National Football League (NFL) were adding teams, and the American Football League (AFL) was becoming an attractive alternative to the NFL. Jennings proposed the NHL add two new teams on the American West Coast for the 1964–65 season, and based his argument on concerns that the Western Hockey League (WHL) intended to operate as a major league in the near future and possibly compete against the NHL for talent. He also hoped that a West Coast presence would make the NHL truly national and improve the league's chances of returning to national television in the United States (its broadcast deal with CBS had expired in 1960). While the governors did not agree to Jennings' proposal, the topic of expansion arose every time that the owners met from then on. In 1965, the league decided to double in size by adding six teams, and in February 1966, expansion franchises were awarded to Los Angeles, Minnesota, Philadelphia, Pittsburgh, St. Louis, and the San Francisco–Oakland area. The six new clubs would begin play in the 1967–68 season. Thus, with Toronto's six-game victory over Montreal in the 1967 Stanley Cup Final, the Original Six era came to a close.

The first dozen seasons (1967–68 to 1978–79) of the expansion era saw the continued dominance by Original Six teams, including the Bobby Orr-led Bruins in the early 1970s and the Canadiens' dynasty at the end of that decade. The expansion teams, by comparison, were not as dominant during that same time period. During those dozen seasons, only one expansion team hoisted the Cup, the Philadelphia Flyers (in 1974 and 1975), and only one Stanley Cup Final series featured two expansion teams (the Flyers' 1975 win over the Buffalo Sabres). By the early 1980s, after further expansion, a merger with the World Hockey Association (WHA), and changes in conference/division alignment and playoff structure, expansion teams began reaching clear parity with the Original Six. Indeed, the 1979 Stanley Cup Final between the Canadiens and Rangers would be the last Finals featuring any Original Six team until 1986, when the Canadiens claimed the Cup, as well as the last all-Original Six Final until Chicago's win over Boston in 2013 (that playoff season featured all of the Original Six teams for the first time since 1995–96).

With the exception of Toronto, since the dawn of the expansion era every Original Six team has played in the Stanley Cup Final at least four times and won the Cup at least once (the Maple Leafs have not competed in a finals series since winning in 1967, the longest active NHL championship drought). The Montreal Canadiens have twice won the Cup by defeating other Original Six clubs in every series of the playoffs – in 1978 (beating Detroit, Toronto, and Boston) and 1979 (beating Toronto, Boston, and New York). Also, the 1991–92 Pittsburgh Penguins are the only team to also win the Cup after beating three of the Original Six (New York and Boston in the Wales Conference playoffs, and Chicago in the finals). Twice, the Eastern Conference champion beat two Original Six teams before being defeated by another in the Stanley Cup Final – the Carolina Hurricanes in 2002 (beat Montreal and Toronto, lost to Detroit) and the Philadelphia Flyers in 2010 (beat Boston and Montreal, lost to Chicago). In the 2013–14 season, the League moved the Red Wings to the Eastern Conference, leaving Chicago as the only Original Six team in the Western Conference. In the 2015 playoffs, the Tampa Bay Lightning became the first team to face only Original Six franchises in the four-round playoff era, beating Detroit, Montreal, and New York in the Eastern playoffs before falling in the Stanley Cup Final to Chicago.

The last active player from the Original Six era was Wayne Cashman, who retired with the Boston Bruins in 1983. The final active player and official in any on-ice capacity for the league was linesman John D'Amico, who retired at the end of the 1986–87 season.

According to Forbes in 2015, five of the Original Six teams were the top five most valuable NHL clubs – the Rangers at approximately $1.2 billion, the Canadiens at $1.18 billion, the Maple Leafs at $1.15 billion, the Blackhawks at $925 million, and the Bruins at $750 million. The Red Wings ranked eighth at $600 million.

== Head-to-head records ==
Records current as of the end of the 2026 Stanley Cup Final.

=== Boston Bruins ===
Opponent	Regular season					Playoffs						
Opponent	Games played	Wins	Losses	Ties	OT/SO losses	Series played	Wins	Losses	Games played	Wins	Losses	Ties
Chicago Black Hawks	602	277	241	79	5	7	5	2	28	18	9	1
Detroit Red Wings	625	263	262	95	5	8	5	3	38	23	15	0
Montreal Canadiens (see Bruins–Canadiens rivalry)	768	298	355	103	12	34	9	25	177	71	106	0
New York Rangers	675	307	257	97	14	10	7	3	47	26	19	2
Toronto Maple Leafs (see Bruins–Maple Leafs rivalry)	695	311	272	98	14	17	9	8	90	46	43	1

=== Chicago Black Hawks ===
Opponent	Regular season					Playoffs						
Opponent	Games played	Wins	Losses	Ties	OT/SO losses	Series played	Wins	Losses	Games played	Wins	Losses	Ties
Boston Bruins	602	246	272	79	5	7	2	5	28	9	18	1
Detroit Red Wings (see Black Hawks–Red Wings rivalry)	757	295	366	84	12	16	9	7	81	43	38	0
Montreal Canadiens	578	164	306	103	5	17	5	12	81	29	50	2
New York Rangers	602	254	246	98	4	5	4	1	24	14	10	0
Toronto Maple Leafs	663	272	291	96	4	9	3	6	38	15	22	1

=== Detroit Red Wings ===
Opponent	Regular season					Playoffs						
Opponent	Games played	Wins	Losses	Ties	OT/SO losses	Series played	Wins	Losses	Games played	Wins	Losses	Ties
Boston Bruins	625	267	256	95	7	8	3	5	38	15	23	0
Chicago Black Hawks (see Black Hawks–Red Wings rivalry)	757	378	278	84	17	16	7	9	81	38	43	0
Montreal Canadiens	615	221	292	96	6	12	7	5	62	29	33	0
New York Rangers	608	274	227	103	7	5	4	1	23	13	10	0
Toronto Maple Leafs (see Maple Leafs–Red Wings rivalry)	691	295	296	93	7	23	11	12	117	59	58	0

=== Montreal Canadiens ===
Opponent	Regular season					Playoffs						
Opponent	Games played	Wins	Losses	Ties	OT/SO losses	Series played	Wins	Losses	Games played	Wins	Losses	Ties
Boston Bruins (see Bruins–Canadiens rivalry)	768	367	286	103	12	34	25	9	177	106	71	0
Chicago Black Hawks	578	311	161	103	3	17	12	5	81	50	29	2
Detroit Red Wings	615	298	212	96	9	12	5	7	62	33	29	0
New York Rangers	647	345	203	94	5	16	7	9	73	38	33	2
Toronto Maple Leafs (see Canadiens–Maple Leafs rivalry)	775	370	304	88	13	16	9	7	78	46	32	0

=== New York Rangers ===
Opponent	Regular season					Playoffs						
Opponent	Games played	Wins	Losses	Ties	OT/SO losses	Series played	Wins	Losses	Games played	Wins	Losses	Ties
Boston Bruins	675	271	303	97	4	10	3	7	47	19	26	2
Chicago Black Hawks	602	250	252	98	2	5	1	4	24	10	14	0
Detroit Red Wings	611	234	265	103	9	5	1	4	23	10	13	0
Montreal Canadiens	647	208	339	94	6	16	9	7	73	33	38	2
Toronto Maple Leafs	632	240	288	95	9	8	5	3	35	19	16	0

=== Toronto Maple Leafs ===
Opponent	Regular season					Playoffs						
Opponent	Games played	Wins	Losses	Ties	OT/SO losses	Series played	Wins	Losses	Games played	Wins	Losses	Ties
Boston Bruins (see Bruins–Maple Leafs rivalry)	695	286	297	98	14	17	8	9	90	43	46	1
Chicago Black Hawks	663	295	268	96	4	9	6	3	38	22	15	1
Detroit Red Wings (see Maple Leafs–Red Wings rivalry)	691	303	287	93	8	23	12	11	117	58	59	0
Montreal Canadiens (see Canadiens–Maple Leafs rivalry)	775	316	351	88	20	16	7	9	78	32	46	0
New York Rangers	632	297	228	95	12	8	3	5	35	16	19	0

== See also ==
- History of the National Hockey League
- History of the National Hockey League (1942–1967)

=== Rivalries involving pairs of Original Six teams ===
- Blackhawks–Red Wings
- Bruins–Canadiens
- Bruins–Maple Leafs
- Canadiens–Maple Leafs
- Maple Leafs–Red Wings
