= Holding the stick =

Penalty in ice hockey

In ice hockey, holding the stick is a penalty called when a player intentionally holds an opposing player's stick in his hands and between any part of his body (i.e. under arms or between legs) to restrict the opposing player's ability to play the puck. The referee will call a minor penalty for this infraction.
