= Atlantic Division (NHL) =

Division of the National Hockey League

- Formerly: Patrick Division, Adams Division, Norris Division
- Conference: Eastern Conference
- League: National Hockey League
- Sport: Ice hockey
- Founded: 1993; Suspended in 2020–21; 2021 (reactivated)
- No. of teams: 8
- Most recent champion: Buffalo Sabres (1st title) (2025–26)
- Most titles: New Jersey Devils (9 titles)

Atlantic Division teams location

The Atlantic Division is a name used by the National Hockey League to describe a division of teams in the Eastern Conference.

The original Atlantic Division, the predecessor of which was the Patrick Division, was formed in 1993 as part of the Eastern Conference in a league realignment.

As part of a 2013 realignment, the entirety of the former Atlantic Division was realigned into the Metropolitan Division. The Atlantic Division name was assigned to a new division comprising the former Northeast Division plus the Florida Panthers and the Tampa Bay Lightning (coincidentally, both were members of the original Atlantic Division until 1998) from the now-defunct Southeast Division, and the Detroit Red Wings, who moved from the Central Division of the Western Conference.

This division features a number of classic and modern NHL rivalries, including Bruins–Canadiens, Bruins–Maple Leafs, Canadiens–Maple Leafs, Maple Leafs–Red Wings, Maple Leafs–Senators, and Lightning–Panthers. Games between the division's three Canadian teams, plus the Bruins and Red Wings, were traditionally featured on Hockey Night in Canada as its main attraction.

== Division lineups ==
=== 1993–1998 ===
1993–1998 Atlantic Division teams
- Florida Panthers
- New Jersey Devils
- New York Islanders
- New York Rangers
- Philadelphia Flyers
- Tampa Bay Lightning
- Washington Capitals

==== Changes from the 1992–93 season ====
- The Atlantic Division is formed as a result of NHL realignment
- The New Jersey Devils, New York Islanders, New York Rangers, Philadelphia Flyers, and Washington Capitals come from the Patrick Division
- The Tampa Bay Lightning come from the Norris Division
- The Florida Panthers are added as an expansion team

=== 1998–2013 ===
1998–2013 Atlantic Division teams
- New Jersey Devils
- New York Islanders
- New York Rangers
- Philadelphia Flyers
- Pittsburgh Penguins

==== Changes from the 1997–98 season ====
- The Florida Panthers, Tampa Bay Lightning, and Washington Capitals move to the Southeast Division
- The Pittsburgh Penguins come from the Northeast Division

=== 2013–2020 ===
2013–2020 Atlantic Division teams
- Boston Bruins
- Buffalo Sabres
- Detroit Red Wings
- Florida Panthers
- Montreal Canadiens
- Ottawa Senators
- Tampa Bay Lightning
- Toronto Maple Leafs

==== Changes from the 2012–13 season ====
- The Northeast and Southeast Divisions are dissolved due to NHL realignment
- The New Jersey Devils, New York Islanders, New York Rangers, Philadelphia Flyers, and Pittsburgh Penguins move to the Metropolitan Division
- The Boston Bruins, Buffalo Sabres, Montreal Canadiens, Ottawa Senators, and Toronto Maple Leafs come from the Northeast Division
- The Florida Panthers and Tampa Bay Lightning come from the Southeast Division
- The Detroit Red Wings come from the Central Division

=== 2020–2021 ===
- Division not used for the 2020–21 NHL season

==== Changes from the 2019–20 season ====
- Due to COVID-19 restrictions the NHL realigned into four divisions with no conferences for the 2020–21 season
- The Boston Bruins and Buffalo Sabres move to the East Division
- The Detroit Red Wings, Florida Panthers and Tampa Bay Lightning move to the Central Division
- The Montreal Canadiens, Ottawa Senators and Toronto Maple Leafs move to the North Division

=== 2021–present ===
2021–present Atlantic Division teams
- Boston Bruins
- Buffalo Sabres
- Detroit Red Wings
- Florida Panthers
- Montreal Canadiens
- Ottawa Senators
- Tampa Bay Lightning
- Toronto Maple Leafs

==== Changes from the 2020–21 season ====
- The league returned to using a four division and two conference alignment
- The Boston Bruins and Buffalo Sabres come from the East Division
- The Detroit Red Wings, Florida Panthers and Tampa Bay Lightning come from the Central Division
- The Montreal Canadiens, Ottawa Senators and Toronto Maple Leafs come from the North Division

== Season results ==
^{(#)}	Denotes team that won the Stanley Cup
^{(#)}	Denotes team that won the Prince of Wales Trophy, but lost Stanley Cup Final
^{(#)}	Denotes team that qualified for the Stanley Cup playoffs
‡	Denotes winner of the Presidents' Trophy

Season	1st	2nd	3rd	4th	5th	6th	7th	8th
1993–94	^{(2)} NY Rangers (112)^{‡}	^{(3)} New Jersey (106)	^{(7)} Washington (88)	^{(8)} NY Islanders (84)	Florida (83)	Philadelphia (80)	Tampa Bay (71)	
1994–95^{[a]}	^{(2)} Philadelphia (60)	^{(5)} New Jersey (52)	^{(6)} Washington (52)	^{(8)}NY Rangers (47)	Florida (46)	Tampa Bay (37)	NY Islanders (35)	
1995–96	^{(1)} Philadelphia (103)	^{(3)} NY Rangers (96)	^{(4)} Florida (92)	^{(7)} Washington (89)	^{(8)} Tampa Bay (88)	New Jersey (86)	NY Islanders (54)	
1996–97	^{(1)} New Jersey (104)	^{(3)} Philadelphia (103)	^{(4)} Florida (89)	^{(5)} NY Rangers (86)	Washington (75)	Tampa Bay (74)	NY Islanders (70)	
1997–98	^{(1)} New Jersey (107)	^{(3)} Philadelphia (95)	^{(4)} Washington (92)	NY Islanders (71)	NY Rangers (68)	Florida (63)	Tampa Bay (44)	
1998–99	^{(1)} New Jersey (105)	^{(5)} Philadelphia (93)	^{(8)} Pittsburgh (90)	NY Rangers (77)	NY Islanders (58)			
1999–2000	^{(1)} Philadelphia (105)	^{(4)} New Jersey (103)	^{(7)} Pittsburgh (88)	NY Rangers (73)	NY Islanders (58)			
2000–01	^{(1)} New Jersey (111)	^{(4)} Philadelphia (100)	^{(6)} Pittsburgh (96)	NY Rangers (72)	NY Islanders (52)			
2001–02	^{(2)} Philadelphia (97)	^{(5)} NY Islanders (96)	^{(6)} New Jersey (95)	NY Rangers (80)	Pittsburgh (69)			
2002–03	^{(2)} New Jersey (108)	^{(4)} Philadelphia (107)	^{(8)} NY Islanders (83)	NY Rangers (78)	Pittsburgh (65)			
2003–04	^{(3)} Philadelphia (101)	^{(6)} New Jersey (100)	^{(8)} NY Islanders (91)	NY Rangers (69)	Pittsburgh (58)			
2004–05	No season due to 2004–05 NHL lockout							
2005–06	^{(3)} New Jersey (101)	^{(5)} Philadelphia (101)	^{(6)} NY Rangers (100)	NY Islanders (78)	Pittsburgh (58)			
2006–07	^{(2)} New Jersey (107)	^{(5)} Pittsburgh (105)	^{(6)} NY Rangers (94)	^{(8)} NY Islanders (92)	Philadelphia (56)			
2007–08	^{(2)} Pittsburgh (102)	^{(4)} New Jersey (99)	^{(5)} NY Rangers (97)	^{(6)} Philadelphia (95)	NY Islanders (79)			
2008–09	^{(3)} New Jersey (106)	^{(4)} Pittsburgh (99)	^{(5)} Philadelphia (99)	^{(7)} NY Rangers (95)	NY Islanders (61)			
2009–10	^{(2)} New Jersey (103)	^{(4)} Pittsburgh (101)	^{(7)} Philadelphia (88)	NY Rangers (87)	NY Islanders (79)			
2010–11	^{(2)} Philadelphia (106)	^{(4)} Pittsburgh (106)	^{(8)} NY Rangers (93)	New Jersey (81)	NY Islanders (73)			
2011–12	^{(1)} NY Rangers (109)	^{(4)} Pittsburgh (108)	^{(5)} Philadelphia (103)	^{(6)} New Jersey (102)	NY Islanders (79)			
2012–13^{[b]}	^{(1)} Pittsburgh (72)	^{(6)} NY Rangers (56)	^{(8)} NY Islanders (55)	Philadelphia (49)	New Jersey (48)			
Realignment
2013–14	^{(1)} Boston (117)^{‡}	^{(2)} Tampa Bay (101)	^{(3)} Montreal (100)	^{(WC2)} Detroit (93)	Ottawa (88)	Toronto (84)	Florida (66)	Buffalo (52)
2014–15	^{(1)} Montreal (110)	^{(2)} Tampa Bay (108)	^{(3)} Detroit (100)	^{(WC1)} Ottawa (99)	Boston (96)	Florida (91)	Toronto (68)	Buffalo (54)
2015–16	^{(1)} Florida (103)	^{(2)} Tampa Bay (97)	^{(3)} Detroit (93)	Boston (93)	Ottawa (85)	Montreal (82)	Buffalo (81)	Toronto (69)
2016–17	^{(1)} Montreal (103)	^{(2)} Ottawa (98)	^{(3)} Boston (95)	^{(WC2)} Toronto (95)	Tampa Bay (94)	Florida (81)	Detroit (79)	Buffalo (78)
2017–18	^{(1)} Tampa Bay (113)	^{(2)} Boston (112)	^{(3)} Toronto (105)	Florida (96)	Detroit (73)	Montreal (71)	Ottawa (67)	Buffalo (62)
2018–19	^{(1)} Tampa Bay (128)^{‡}	^{(2)}Boston (107)	^{(3)} Toronto (100)	Montreal (96)	Florida (86)	Buffalo (76)	Detroit (74)	Ottawa (64)
2019–20^{[c]}	^{(1)} Boston (70 gp 100 pts..714 ppct.)^{‡}	^{(2)} Tampa Bay (70 gp 92 pts..657 ppct.)	^{(8)} Toronto (70 gp 81 pts..579 ppct.)	^{(10)} Florida (69 gp 78 pts..565 ppct.)	^{(12)} Montreal (71 gp 71 pts..500 ppct.)	Buffalo (69 gp 68 pts..493 ppct.)	Ottawa (71 gp 62 pts..437 ppct.)	Detroit (71 gp 39 pts..275 ppct.)
2020–21	Division suspended for season; temporary realignment							
2021–22	^{(1)} Florida (122)^{‡}	^{(2)} Toronto (115)	^{(3)} Tampa Bay (110)	^{(WC1)} Boston (107)	Buffalo (75)	Detroit (74)	Ottawa (73)	Montreal (55)
2022–23	^{(1)} Boston (135)^{‡}	^{(2)} Toronto (111)	^{(3)} Tampa Bay (98)	^{(WC2)} Florida (92)	Buffalo (91)	Ottawa (86)	Detroit (80)	Montreal (68)
2023–24	^{(1)} Florida (110)	^{(2)} Boston (109)	^{(3)} Toronto (102)	^{(WC1)} Tampa Bay (98)	Detroit (91)	Buffalo (84)	Ottawa (78)	Montreal (76)
2024–25	^{(1)} Toronto (108)	^{(2)} Tampa Bay (102)	^{(3)} Florida (98)	^{(WC1)} Ottawa (97)	^{(WC2)} Montreal (91)	Detroit (86)	Buffalo (79)	Boston (76)
2025–26	^{(1)} Buffalo (109)	^{(2)} Tampa Bay (106)	^{(3)} Montreal (106)	^{(WC1)} Boston (100)	^{(WC2)} Ottawa (99)	Detroit (92)	Florida (84)	Toronto (78)

Notes

- ^{a} The 1994–95 NHL season was shortened to 48 games due to the lockout.
- ^{b} The 2012–13 NHL season was shortened to 48 games due to the lockout.
- ^{c} The 2019–20 NHL season was cut short due to the COVID-19 pandemic. Due to the imbalance in the number of games played among teams, the regular season standings were determined by points percentage.

== Atlantic Division titles won by team ==
Teams in bold are currently in the division.

Team	Wins	Last win
New Jersey Devils	9	2010
Philadelphia Flyers	6	2011
**Boston Bruins**	3	2023
**Florida Panthers**	3	2024
**Montreal Canadiens**	2	2017
New York Rangers	2	2012
Pittsburgh Penguins	2	2013
**Tampa Bay Lightning**	2	2019
**Buffalo Sabres**	1	2026
**Toronto Maple Leafs**	1	2025
**Detroit Red Wings**	0	—
**Ottawa Senators**	0	—
New York Islanders	0	—
Washington Capitals	0	—
