= 1992 Stanley Cup Final =

1992 ice hockey championship series

	1	2	3	4	Total
Pittsburgh Penguins	5	3	1	6	4
Chicago Blackhawks	4	1	0	5	0
- Location(s): Pittsburgh: Civic Arena (1, 2); Chicago: Chicago Stadium (3, 4)
- Coaches: Pittsburgh: Scotty Bowman; Chicago: Mike Keenan
- Captains: Pittsburgh: Mario Lemieux; Chicago: Dirk Graham
- National anthems: Pittsburgh: Christina Aguilera; Chicago: Wayne Messmer
- Referees: Terry Gregson, Don Koharski, Andy Van Hellemond
- Dates: May 26 – June 1, 1992
- MVP: Mario Lemieux (Penguins)
- Series-winning goal: Ron Francis (7:59, third)
- Hall of Famers: Penguins: Tom Barrasso (2023); Ron Francis (2007); Mario Lemieux (1997); Joe Mullen (2000; did not play); Larry Murphy (2004); Bryan Trottier (1997); Blackhawks: Ed Belfour (2011); Chris Chelios (2013); Michel Goulet (1998); Dominik Hasek (2014); Jeremy Roenick (2024); Coaches: Scotty Bowman (1991); Officials: Andy Van Hellemond (1999)
- Networks: Canada: (English): CBC (French): SRC; United States: (National): SportsChannel America (Pittsburgh area): KBL (1–2), KDKA (3–4) (Chicago area): SportsChannel Chicago (1–2), Hawkvision (3–4)
- Announcers: (CBC) Bob Cole, Harry Neale, and Dick Irvin Jr. (SRC) Claude Quenneville and Gilles Tremblay (SportsChannel America) Jiggs McDonald and Bill Clement (KBL/KDKA) Mike Lange and Paul Steigerwald (SportsChannel Chicago/Hawkvision) Pat Foley and Dale Tallon

The 1992 Stanley Cup Final was the championship series of the National Hockey League's (NHL) 1991–92 season, and the culmination of the 1992 Stanley Cup playoffs. It was contested by the Prince of Wales Conference and defending Stanley Cup champion Pittsburgh Penguins and the Clarence Campbell Conference champion Chicago Blackhawks. The Blackhawks were appearing in their first Final since 1973. After the Blackhawks jumped to an early 4–1 lead in the first game of the series, Mario Lemieux and the Penguins came back to win the game, sweep the series in four games, and win their second consecutive and second overall Stanley Cup. The fourth and final game of this series was the first time a Stanley Cup playoff game was played in the month of June and at the time it was the latest finishing date for an NHL season. This was also the last Final to be played at Chicago Stadium as it closed in 1994.

== Paths to the Final ==
Pittsburgh defeated the Washington Capitals 4–3 in the Patrick Division Semifinals, the Presidents' Trophy winning New York Rangers 4–2 in the Patrick Division Finals, and the Adams Division champion Boston Bruins 4–0 in the Prince of Wales Conference Finals to reach the Stanley Cup Final.

For Chicago to reach the Stanley Cup Final, it had to get past two of its fiercest rivals. First, the Blackhawks defeated the St. Louis Blues 4–2 in the Norris Division Semifinals, then their long-time Original Six rivals, the Detroit Red Wings, 4–0 in the Norris Division Finals. Finally, Chicago swept the Smythe Division champion Edmonton Oilers 4–0 in the Clarence Campbell Conference Finals to reach the Cup Final.

With their co-tenants at Chicago Stadium, the Bulls, coached by Phil Jackson and led by Michael Jordan, playing in (and winning) the NBA Finals, it was an opportunity for both the Blackhawks and the Bulls to help the city of Chicago become the first city to have both NHL and NBA championships in the same year. Two years later, New York City would also have this opportunity, when the NBA's Knicks and NHL's Rangers made the finals in their respective sports. However, the result was the same, albeit a reversal of Chicago's ending, as the Rangers won their first Stanley Cup since 1940 while the Knicks lost, with both series going the full seven games.

Chicago set an NHL playoff record in winning 11 games in a row to reach the Cup Final. Ed Belfour had set a new record for consecutive wins by a goaltender with eleven while Barrasso had won seven in a row.

Pittsburgh had won seven in a row entering the finals and swept Chicago in four games to tie Chicago's record. Pittsburgh then extended the playoff winning streak record to 14 with wins in the first three games against the New Jersey Devils in the following season's first playoff round.

Both teams finished the regular season with 87 points. The Penguins earned home-ice advantage by virtue of having 39 wins to the Blackhawks' 36.

== Game summaries ==
The Penguins were led by captain Mario Lemieux, coach Scotty Bowman, and goaltender Tom Barrasso. The Blackhawks were led by captain Dirk Graham, head coach Mike Keenan and goaltender Ed Belfour. They also made history in having the first Russian-born player to have a chance to get their name on the Stanley Cup in Igor Kravchuk.

Mario Lemieux won the Conn Smythe Trophy as playoff MVP for the second consecutive year, becoming only the second player in NHL history to do so: Bernie Parent had won it when the Philadelphia Flyers won the Cup in the consecutive years of 1974 and 1975.

=== Game one ===
May 26	Chicago Blackhawks	4–5	Pittsburgh Penguins	Civic Arena	Recap

In the opening game of the 1992 Stanley Cup Final, the Penguins overcame deficits of 3–0 in the first period and 4–1 halfway through the second period to win by a score of 5–4. This was the first victory from a three-goal deficit in the Final since 1944

Six minutes into the game, the Blackhawks' forecheck drew a penalty against Pittsburgh. Right off the subsequent face-off, Chris Chelios scored the first goal of the Stanley Cup Final on a wrist shot. After surviving a Pittsburgh powerplay, the Blackhawks' aggressive offensive-zone strategy would lead to two more Blackhawks goals within a 26-second window. First, Michel Goulet converted a takeaway on the boards in the Penguins' zone to make it 2–0, then Dirk Graham scored on a rebound with the shot by Chelios. Pittsburgh got on the board after Igor Kravchuk got penalized for holding and Phil Bourque scored on a wraparound after Blackhawks goalkeeper Ed Belfour lost his stick. Chicago subsequently extended their lead to 4–1 via a two-on-one breakaway from Steve Larmer to Brent Sutter, who beat Tom Barrasso under his left leg. Just as their powerplay from Chicago's too-many-men penalty expired, Rick Tocchet deflected a shot from Paul Stanton into the Chicago net. Then, on the Penguins' next rush, Kevin Stevens drew several Blackhawks on him, which gave Mario Lemieux room to bank the puck off the Ed Belfour's leg, decreasing the deficit to 4–3. After fifteen minutes in the third, the Penguins would equalize the score. Aided by a pick on a Pittsburgh defender by Shawn McEachern, Jaromír Jágr deked around three Blackhawks, charging into the crease starting from the boards, and beat Belfour on a backhand shot to tie the game at 4–4 with 4:55 remaining in the third period. After both Mike Hudson for the Blackhawks and Lemieux for the Penguins drew penalties while charging the offensive zone against two opposing defenders, almost exactly two minutes apart, the game seemed poised to go into overtime with Pittsburgh playing with a one-man advantage. However, on an offensive-zone face-off to start the Pittsburgh powerplay, Mario Lemieux charged the Blackhawks' net from the weak side and put a rebound off a shot by Larry Murphy past Belfour to deliver the game-winning goal; in total, Pittsburgh had the lead for all of thirteen seconds and won the game.

Scoring summary
Period	Team	Goal	Assist(s)	Time	Score
1st	CHI	Chris Chelios (6) – pp	Brent Sutter (5)	06:34	1–0 CHI
1st	CHI	Michel Goulet (3)	Unassisted	13:17	2–0 CHI
1st	CHI	Dirk Graham (4)	Chris Chelios (12)	13:43	3-0 CHI
1st	PIT	Phil Bourque (3) – pp	Rick Tocchet (8) and Ron Francis (18)	17:26	3–1 CHI
2nd	CHI	Brent Sutter (3)	Steve Larmer (7) and Chris Chelios (13)	11:36	4–1 CHI
2nd	PIT	Rick Tocchet (5)	Paul Stanton (7) and Shawn McEachern (6)	15:24	4–2 CHI
2nd	PIT	Mario Lemieux (12)	Kevin Stevens (13)	16:23	4–3 CHI
3rd	PIT	Jaromír Jágr (10)	Unassisted	15:05	4–4
3rd	PIT	Mario Lemieux (13) – pp	Larry Murphy (9) and Ron Francis (19)	19:47	5–4 PIT
Penalty summary
1st	CHI	Mike Hudson	Interference	02:07	2:00
1st	PIT	Gordie Roberts	Holding	06:27	2:00
1st	CHI	Mike Peluso	Hooking	09:34	2:00
1st	CHI	Igor Kravchuk	Holding	15:44	2:00
1st	PIT	Bryan Trottier	Interference	18:39	2:00
2nd	CHI	Rob Brown	Elbowing	02:17	2:00
2nd	CHI	Bench (served by Jocelyn Lemieux)	Too many men on the ice	13:21	2:00
3rd	PIT	Paul Stanton	Hooking	01:24	2:00
3rd	PIT	Larry Murphy	Hooking	17:39	2:00
3rd	CHI	Steve Smith	Hooking	19:42	2:00

Shots by period
Team	1	2	3	Total
Chicago	11	11	12	34
Pittsburgh	15	10	14	39

=== Game two ===
May 28	Chicago Blackhawks	1–3	Pittsburgh Penguins	Civic Arena	Recap

In game two, nearly ten minutes into the game, Bob Errey scored the first goal for Pittsburgh shorthanded. In the second period, after denying Lemieux his scoring chance, Bryan Marchment trailed the subsequent play into the Pittsburgh zone and then won a physical battle against Larry Murphy. On a seemingly broken play he put the puck past Tom Barrasso into the Pittsburgh goal to tie the game at 1–1. However, Marchment was called for an elbow check and Mario Lemieux scored on a one timer set up by Rick Tocchet, 43 seconds into the ensuing powerplay. Two-and-a-half minutes later, Brian Marchment, who had been the catalyst for Chicago's lone goal, was beaten on the boards by Rick Tocchet. Tocchet again fed Lemieux in the slot, and another one timer extended the Pittsburgh lead to 3–1. The Penguins then limited the Blackhawks shots to four in the third period to take Game 2 3–1.

Scoring summary
Period	Team	Goal	Assist(s)	Time	Score
1st	PIT	Bob Errey (3) – sh	Jim Paek (2)	09:52	1–0 PIT
2nd	CHI	Bryan Marchment (1)	Brian Noonan (7) and Greg Gilbert (2)	10:24	1–1
2nd	PIT	Mario Lemieux (14) – pp	Rick Tocchet (9)	12:55	2–1 PIT
2nd	PIT	Mario Lemieux (15)	Rick Tocchet (10) and Kjell Samuelsson (3)	15:23	3–1 PIT
3rd	None				
Penalty summary
1st	CHI	Mike Peluso	Roughing	02:07	2:00
1st	PIT	Paul Stanton	Delay of game	07:38	2:00
1st	PIT	Paul Stanton	Tripping	07:38	2:00
1st	CHI	Steve Smith	Interference	11:05	2:00
1st	CHI	Brian Noonan	Cross-checking	18:36	2:00
2nd	CHI	Bryan Marchment	Elbowing	12:12	2:00
2nd	CHI	Bench (served by Dirk Graham)	Too many men on the ice	19:43	2:00
3rd	PIT	Gordie Roberts	Holding	02:07	2:00

Shots by period
Team	1	2	3	Total
Chicago	11	4	4	19
Pittsburgh	8	11	6	25

=== Game three ===
May 30	Pittsburgh Penguins	1–0	Chicago Blackhawks	Chicago Stadium	Recap

In game three, the Blackhawks put up more offensive pressure on the Penguins. Pittsburgh instead shut out the Blackhawks, with Tom Barrasso stopping all 27 shots in the three periods. The lone goal came from Kevin Stevens putting his team into a 3–0 series lead. With 31 seconds remaining in the game, Penguins defenseman Larry Murphy struck Blackhawks defenseman Chris Chelios in the face. In response, Chelios threw down his gloves and stick and began punching Murphy multiple times in the head. As a result, Chelios was given a major penalty and was ejected from the game.

Scoring summary
Period	Team	Goal	Assist(s)	Time	Score
1st	PIT	Kevin Stevens (12)	Jim Paek (3) and Rick Tocchet (11)	15:26	1–0 PIT
2nd	None				
3rd	None				
Penalty summary
1st	PIT	Kjell Samuelsson	High-sticking	05:43	2:00
1st	PIT	Gordie Roberts	Tripping	11:50	2:00
1st	CHI	Michel Goulet	Holding	16:47	2:00
1st	PIT	Jaromír Jágr	Holding	19:14	2:00
2nd	CHI	Steve Larmer	Cross-checking	04:38	2:00
2nd	PIT	Paul Stanton	Holding	07:04	2:00
2nd	CHI	Chris Chelios	Slashing	10:56	2:00
3rd	PIT	Jim Paek	Interference	10:05	2:00
3rd	CHI	Chris Chelios	Fighting – major	19:29	5:00
3rd	CHI	Chris Chelios	Game misconduct	19:29	10:00

Shots by period
Team	1	2	3	Total
Pittsburgh	6	8	6	20
Chicago	13	6	8	27

=== Game four ===
June 1	Pittsburgh Penguins	6–5	Chicago Blackhawks	Chicago Stadium	Recap

After the series saw a total of just one goal over the course of 86 minutes of hockey spanning from the second period of game two to the early moments of game four, the two teams erupted for an eleven-goal outburst in game four, which was the first NHL game played in the month of June. There were four goals scored in the first seven minutes of the game, and five in the first eleven, with the first period ending with a score of 3–3. The lasting image of the opening stanza was perhaps the sea of hats on the ice after Blackhawks captain Dirk Graham recorded a hat trick by accounting for all three of Chicago's goals. Pittsburgh's goals were scored by Jaromír Jágr after Ed Belfour turned over the puck behind his goal; by Kevin Stevens on a one-handed backhand wrist shot that was deemed "stoppable" by TV analyst Bill Clement (and sparked the change in goal); and by Mario Lemieux on a rebound off a shot from Larry Murphy, which had been set up by Lemieux. Graham scored his hat trick to answer each of these I goals on a rebound off his own backhand shot and two one-timers after he was left alone at the Pittsburgh crease in both instances. There were two goals scored in the second period – one on each side – to make the score 4–4. Pittsburgh's tally came just 58 seconds into the period, when Rick Tocchet was left alone after the Blackhawks neglected to defend the area near the crease. With less than five minutes to go in the second period, the Blackhawks immediately scored a goal to tie the game for the fourth time, when Jeremy Roenick deflected a shot by Brian Noonan off Murphy's leg. The proverbial floodgates would, however, open almost exactly five minutes into the final period, when the Penguins scored twice in just over three minutes. At first, a shoulder check by Mario Lemieux against Chris Chelios behind the Chicago goal set up a wrist shot by Larry Murphy through traffic, which went past Hasek for a 5–4 Pittsburgh lead. Then Ron Francis converted a slapshot in a two-on-one situation to give Pittsburgh its first two-goal lead of the game. Chicago would come closer once more, when Jeremy Roenick scored at the 11:18 mark to make it 6–5 Pittsburgh after Larry Murphy tripped behind his own goal, just over three minutes after the second Pittsburgh goal of the period. Just a minute later, Chris Chelios hit the goal post, and the Roenick-Chelios pair would also sustain pressure in the final minute of the game with Chicago playing with an empty net. Overall however, Pittsburgh still controlled most stretches of these final eight minutes, as they didn't have trouble getting out of their zone. Pittsburgh finished the game 6–5 earning their second Stanley Cup. Mario Lemieux was given the Conn Smythe Trophy as the MVP of the playoffs.

Scoring summary
Period	Team	Goal	Assist(s)	Time	Score
1st	PIT	Jaromír Jágr (11)	Troy Loney (5)	01:37	1–0 PIT
1st	CHI	Dirk Graham (5)	Stephane Matteau (6) and Chris Chelios (14)	06:21	1–1
1st	PIT	Kevin Stevens (13)	Mario Lemieux (17) and Rick Tocchet (12)	06:33	2–1 PIT
1st	CHI	Dirk Graham (6)	Chris Chelios (15)	06:51	2–2
1st	PIT	Mario Lemieux (16) – pp	Larry Murphy (10) and Kevin Stevens (14)	10:13	3–2 PIT
1st	CHI	Dirk Graham (7)	Jocelyn Lemieux (1) and Brian Noonan (8)	16:18	3–3
2nd	PIT	Rick Tocchet (6)	Mario Lemieux (18) and Kevin Stevens (15)	00:58	4–3 PIT
2nd	CHI	Jeremy Roenick (11)	Brian Noonan (9) and Greg Gilbert (3)	15:40	4–4
3rd	PIT	Larry Murphy (6)	Rick Tocchet (13)	04:51	5–4 PIT
3rd	PIT	Ron Francis (8)	Shawn McEachern (7) and Jim Paek (4)	07:59	6–4 PIT
3rd	CHI	Jeremy Roenick (12)	Stu Grimson (1) and Rod Buskas (1)	11:18	6–5 PIT
Penalty summary
1st	CHI	Greg Gilbert	Misconduct	07:28	10:00
1st	PIT	Ulf Samuelsson	Interference	07:28	2:00
1st	PIT	Paul Stanton	Misconduct	07:28	10:00
1st	CHI	Chris Chelios	Elbowing	08:17	2:00
1st	PIT	Gordie Roberts	Roughing	12:44	2:00
2nd	PIT	Paul Stanton	Hooking	02:21	2:00
2nd	PIT	Rick Tocchet	Holding	05:41	2:00
3rd	None				

Shots by period
Team	1	2	3	Total
Pittsburgh	12	9	8	29
Chicago	8	14	7	29

== Broadcasting ==
In Canada, the series was televised in English on the CBC and in French on SRC.

In the United States, this was the last Stanley Cup Final to air nationally on SportsChannel America. ESPN would pick up the national U.S. contract for the next season.

SportsChannel America's national coverage was blacked out in the Chicago and Pittsburgh areas due to the local rights to Blackhawks and Penguins games in those respective TV markets. SportsChannel Chicago/Hawkvision aired the games in Chicago. In Pittsburgh, KBL televised games one and two while KDKA aired games three and four.

== Team rosters ==
Years indicated in boldface under the "Cup Final appearance" column signify that the player won the Stanley Cup in the given year.

=== Chicago Blackhawks ===
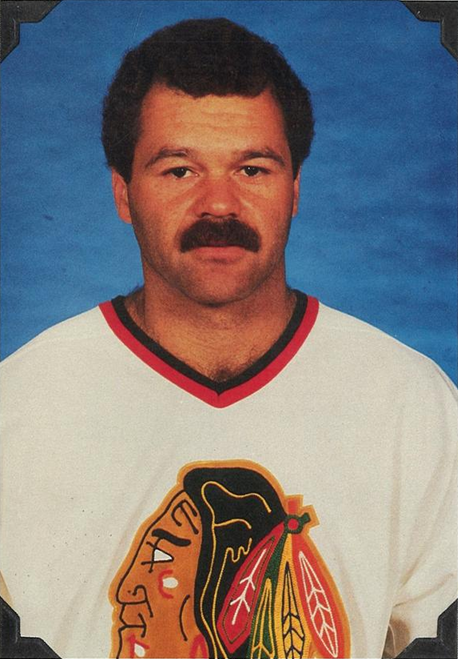
Dirk Graham captained the Blackhawks to their first Stanley Cup Final appearance since 1973.

#	Nat	Player	Position	Hand	Acquired	Place of birth	Finals appearance
30	(Canada)	Ed Belfour	G	L	1988–89	Carman, Manitoba	first
4	(Canada)	Keith Brown	D	R	1979	Corner Brook, Newfoundland and Labrador	first
22	(Canada)	Rob Brown	RW	L	1991–92	Kingston, Ontario	first
25	(Canada)	Rod Buskas	D	R	1991–92	Wetaskiwin, Alberta	first
7	(United States)	Chris Chelios – **A**	D	R	1990–91	Chicago, Illinois	third **(1986**, 1989)
14	(Canada)	Greg Gilbert	LW	L	1988–89	Mississauga, Ontario	fourth (**1982**, **1983**, 1984)
16	(Canada)	Michel Goulet	LW	L	1989–90	Péribonka, Quebec	first
33	(Canada)	Dirk Graham – **C**	RW	R	1987–88	Regina, Saskatchewan	first
23	(Canada)	Stu Grimson	LW	L	1990–91	Vancouver, British Columbia	first
31	(Czechoslovakia)	Dominik Hasek	G	L	1983	Pardubice, Czechoslovakia	first
34	(Canada)	Tony Horacek	LW	L	1991–92	Vancouver, British Columbia	first (did not play)
11	(Canada)	Tony Hrkac	C	L	1991–92	Thunder Bay, Ontario	first (did not play)
20	(Canada)	Mike Hudson	C	L	1986	Guelph, Ontario	first
3	(Russia)	Igor Kravchuk	D	L	1991	Ufa, Soviet Union	first
6	(Czechoslovakia)	Frantisek Kucera	D	L	1983	Prague, Czechoslovakia	first
28	(Canada)	Steve Larmer – **A**	RW	L	1980	Peterborough, Ontario	first
15	(Canada)	Brad Lauer	LW	L	1991–92	Humboldt, Saskatchewan	first (did not play)
26	(Canada)	Jocelyn Lemieux	RW	L	1989–90	Mont-Laurier, Quebec	first
2	(Canada)	Bryan Marchment	D	L	1991–92	Scarborough, Ontario	first
32	(Canada)	Stephane Matteau	LW	L	1991–92	Rouyn-Noranda, Quebec	first
19	(Canada)	Dean McAmmond	C	L	1991	Grande Cache, Alberta	first (did not play)
19	(United States)	Brian Noonan	RW	R	1983	Boston, Massachusetts	first
44	(United States)	Mike Peluso	LW	L	1990–91	Pengilly, Minnesota	first
27	(United States)	Jeremy Roenick	C	R	1988	Boston, Massachusetts	first
8	(Canada)	Cam Russell	D	L	1987	Halifax, Nova Scotia	first
5	(Canada)	Steve Smith	D	L	1991–92	Glasgow, Scotland	fourth (**1987**, **1988**, **1990**)
12	(Canada)	Brent Sutter	C	R	1991–92	Viking, Alberta	fifth (**1981**, **1982**, **1983**, 1984)

=== Pittsburgh Penguins ===
#	Nat	Player	Position	Hand	Acquired	Place of birth	Finals appearance
35	(United States)	Tom Barrasso	G	R	1988–89	Boston, Massachusetts	second **(1991**)
29	(United States)	Phil Bourque	LW	L	1983–84	Chelmsford, Massachusetts	second **(1991**)
14	(Canada)	Jock Callander	RW/C	R	1987–88	Regina, Saskatchewan	first
16	(United States)	Jay Caufield	RW	R	1988–89	Philadelphia, Pennsylvania	second (**1991**) (did not play)
6	(Canada)	Jeff Chychrun	D	R	1991–92	LaSalle, Quebec	first (did not play)
43	(Canada)	Jeff Daniels	LW	L	1990–91	Oshawa, Ontario	first (did not play)
12	(Canada)	Bob Errey – **A**	LW	L	1983	Montreal, Quebec	second **(1991**)
10	(Canada)	Ron Francis	C	L	1990–91	Sault Ste. Marie, Ontario	second **(1991**)
38	(Czechoslovakia)	Jiri Hrdina	C	L	1990–91	Prague, Czechoslovakia	third (**1989**, **1991**)
68	(Czechoslovakia)	Jaromir Jágr	RW	L	1990	Kladno, Czechoslovakia	second **(1991**)
3	(Canada)	Grant Jennings	D	L	1990–91	Hudson Bay, Saskatchewan	second **(1991**)
20	(United States)	Jamie Leach	RW	R	1991–92	Winnipeg, Manitoba	first (did not play)
66	(Canada)	Mario Lemieux – **C**	C	R	1984	Montreal, Quebec	second **(1991**)
24	(Canada)	Troy Loney	LW	L	1982	Bow Island, Alberta	second **(1991**)
15	(United States)	Shawn McEachern	LW	L	1987	Waltham, Massachusetts	first
34	(Canada)	Dave Michayluk	RW	L	1991–92	Wakaw, Saskatchewan	first
7	(United States)	Joe Mullen	RW	R	1990–91	New York, New York	fourth (1986, **1989**, **1991**)
55	(Canada)	Larry Murphy	D	R	1989–90	Scarborough, Ontario	second **(1991**)
45	(Canada)	Mike Needham	RW	R	1991–92	Calgary, Alberta	first (did not play)
2	(Canada)	Jim Paek	D	L	1985	Seoul, South Korea	second **(1991**)
18	(Canada)	Ken Priestlay	C	L	1990–91	Vancouver, British Columbia	first (did not play)
28	(United States)	Gordie Roberts	D	L	1990–91	Detroit, Michigan	third (1981, **1991)**
23	(Sweden)	Kjell Samuelsson	D	R	1991–92	Tingsryd, Sweden	second (1987)
5	(Sweden)	Ulf Samuelsson	D	L	1990–91	Fagersta, Sweden	second **(1991**)
22	(United States)	Paul Stanton	D	R	1985	Boston, Massachusetts	second **(1991**)
25	(United States)	Kevin Stevens	LW	L	1983–84	Brockton, Massachusetts	second **(1991**)
32	(United States)	Peter Taglianetti	D	L	1990–91	Framingham, Massachusetts	second (**1991**) (did not play)
92	(Canada)	Rick Tocchet	RW	R	1991–92	Scarborough, Ontario	third (1985, 1987)
19	(Canada)	Bryan Trottier – **A**	C	L	1990–91	Val Marie, Saskatchewan	seventh (**1980**, **1981**, **1982**, **1983**, 1984, **1991**)
31	(Canada)	Ken Wregget	G	L	1991–92	Brandon, Manitoba	first
1	(Canada)	Wendell Young	G	L	1988–89	Halifax, Nova Scotia	second (**1991**) (did not dress)

== Stanley Cup engraving ==
The 1992 Stanley Cup was presented to Penguins captain Mario Lemieux by NHL President John Ziegler following the Penguins 6–5 win over the Blackhawks in game four. It was the last of 15 Stanley Cup presentations presided over by Ziegler; this duty passed to Commissioner Gary Bettman the next season.

The following Penguins players and staff had their names engraved on the Stanley Cup

1991–92 Pittsburgh Penguins

=== Players ===
Centres

- 10 Ron Francis
- 18 Ken Priestlay †
- 19 Bryan Trottier (A)
- 38 Jiri Hrdina
- 66 Mario Lemieux (Captain)

Wingers

- 7 Joe Mullen
- 12 Bob Errey (A)
- 14 Jock Callander*
- 15 Shawn McEachern
- 16 Jay Caufield †
- 20 Jamie Leach †
- 24 Troy Loney
- 25 Kevin Stevens
- 29 Phil Bourque
- 34 Dave Michayluk
- 43 Jeff Daniels ‡
- 45 Mike Needham ‡
- 68 Jaromír Jágr
- 92 Rick Tocchet

Defencemen

- 2 Jim Paek
- 3 Grant Jennings
- 5 Ulf Samuelsson
- 6 Jeff Chychrun †
- 22 Paul Stanton
- 23 Kjell Samuelsson
- 28 Gordie Roberts
- 32 Peter Taglianetti †
- 55 Larry Murphy

Goaltenders

- 1 Wendell Young †
- 31 Ken Wregget
- 35 Tom Barrasso
- * Played both centre and wing.
- † Did not play or dress in the Final.
- ‡ Did not officially qualify, (Note: Automatic qualification for a player's name to be engraved on the Stanley Cup: Playing in (for a goaltender, dressing for) at least one Stanley Cup Final game or at least half of regular season games for the Stanley Cup winning team.) but name was still engraved on the Stanley Cup.

=== Coaching and administrative staff ===
- Morris Belzberg (Owner), Howard Baldwin Sr. (Owner/President), Thomas Ruta (Owner)
- Donn Patton (Vice President-Chief Financial Officer), J. Paul Martha (Vice President-General Council), Craig Patrick (Vice President/General Manager)
- Bob Johnson (Coach), William Scotty Bowman (Head Coach/Director of Player Development-Recruitment), Barry Smith (Asst. Coach), Rick Kehoe (Asst. Coach)
- Pierre McGuire (Asst. Coach), Gilles Meloche (Goaltending Coach/Scout), Rick Paterson (Asst. Coach)
- Steve Latin (Equipment Manager), Charles "Skip" Thayer (Trainer), John Welday (Strength-Conditioning Coach), Greg Malone (Head Scout)
- Les Binkley (Scout), Charlie Hodge (Scout), John Gill (Scout), Ralph Cox (Scout)

=== Engraving notes ===
- #18 Ken Priestlay (C) played in 49 regular season games and was sent to the minors at the trade deadline, but rejoined the team late in the playoffs. His name was included on the Stanley Cup engraving despite rejoining the roster during the playoffs.
- #45 Mike Needham (RW) did not play in any regular season games (played in the minors), but played in 5 playoff games (one playoff game in the conference finals, but not in the Final). #43 Jeff Daniels (LW) played in 2 regular season games for Pittsburgh, spent the rest of the regular season in the minors, but was recalled during the playoffs. Their names were included on the Stanley Cup engraving despite not officially qualifying.
- Pittsburgh included a record 31 players on the Stanley Cup in 1992.
- Bob Johnson, head coach of the Penguins in the 1990–91 season and for their 1991 championship, died on November 26, 1991, of cancer. The NHL allowed the 1991–92 Penguins to have his name engraved on the Cup.
- Pittsburgh included all 52 names with full first and last name. For the first time since engraving became an annual event in 1923-24 none of non-playing members were included on with a position. The only position listed was Mario Lemieux Capt.
- Team Doctor Charles Burke won cups with Pittsburgh in 1991 and 1992, but his name was left off the Stanley Cup.
- 1992 Pittsburgh Penguins filled the last spot on the shoulder of the Stanley Cup. No winning team name since has been added to the Stanley Cup shoulder.
- Since the last larger ring was filled in 1991. The NHL decided to remove the top ring with winning teams from 1927–28 to 1939–40 and retire it to the Hockey Hall of Fame. A new blank ring was added at the bottom to include the 1992 Pittsburgh Penguins team members. NHL decided to keep the Stanley Cup the same size and shape 34 1/2 inches tall and 35 1/2 pounds. This way the cup does not get too big, and it remains the same size/shape that hockey fans are used to. It also encourages more fans to go to Toronto and see all the names on the retired rings at the Hockey Hall of Fame.

== See also ==
- 1991–92 NHL season
- List of Stanley Cup champions
- 1991–92 Chicago Blackhawks season
- 1991–92 Pittsburgh Penguins season

== Notes ==
Preceded by Pittsburgh Penguins; 1991	Pittsburgh Penguins; Stanley Cup champions 1992	Succeeded by Montreal Canadiens; 1993
