= 1992 Stanley Cup playoffs =

1992 hockey playoffs

Tournament details
- Dates: April 18–June 1, 1992
- Teams: 16
- Defending champions: Pittsburgh Penguins

Final positions
- Champions: Pittsburgh Penguins
- Runners-up: Chicago Blackhawks

Tournament statistics
- Scoring leader(s): Mario Lemieux (Penguins) (34 points)

Awards
- MVP: Mario Lemieux (Penguins)

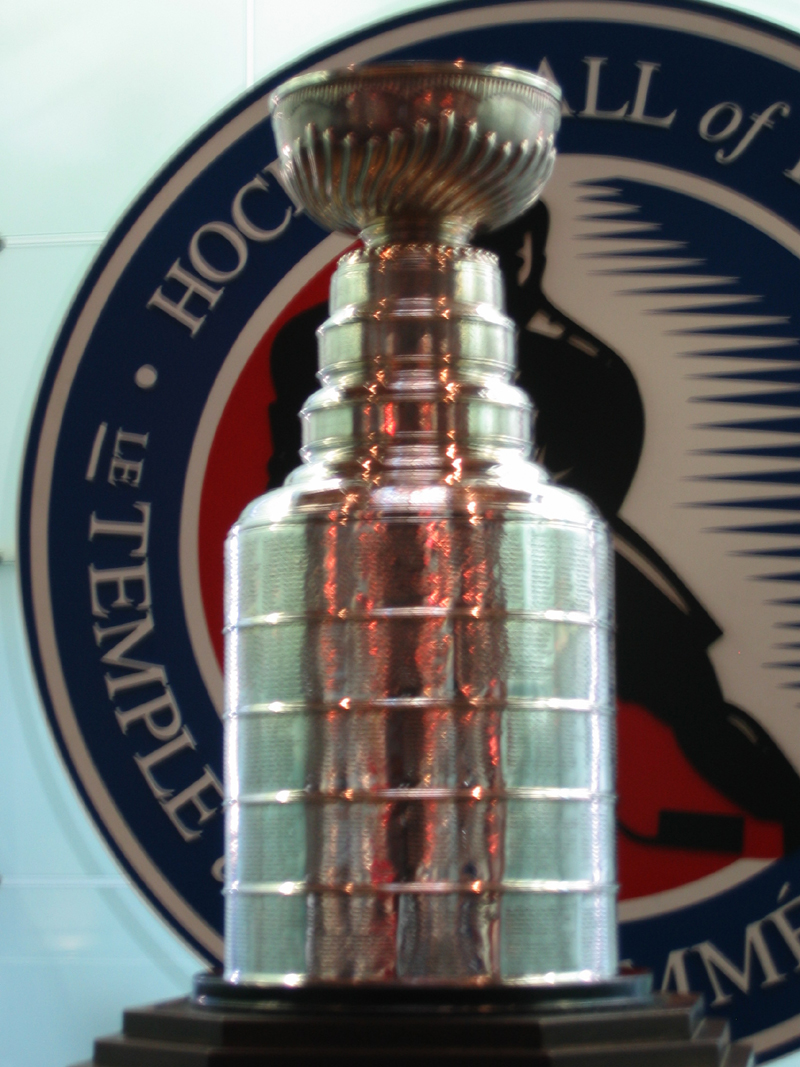
The Stanley Cup

The 1992 Stanley Cup playoffs, the playoff tournament of the National Hockey League (NHL) began on April 18, after the conclusion of the 1991–92 NHL season. The playoffs concluded with the Pittsburgh Penguins defeating the Chicago Blackhawks in a four-game sweep to win their second consecutive Stanley Cup, and second overall in franchise history.

The 1992 playoffs saw history being made, as for the first time ever, all four division winners were eliminated in the same round. In the division finals, the Norris Division champion Detroit Red Wings were swept by the Chicago Blackhawks in four straight games, and the Montreal Canadiens, who had won the Adams Division, suffered the same fate at the hands of the Boston Bruins. The Pittsburgh Penguins eliminated the Patrick Division titlists, the New York Rangers, in six games, while the Vancouver Canucks, the Smythe Division toppers, fell to the Edmonton Oilers, also in six games.

A record 54 games were played in the first round, with six of the eight series going the full seven games, and the other two going six games (the Oilers' win over the Kings and the Blackhawks' win over the Blues). Three of the eight series featured teams coming back from 3–1 series deficits (Detroit against Minnesota, Pittsburgh against Washington, and Vancouver against Winnipeg), the most in a single playoff year; this record was equaled in 2003. Conversely, five series ended in sweeps, the most in a single playoffs since the modern format of four rounds of best-of-7 series was introduced in 1987.

This was the last year the Hartford Whalers and Minnesota North Stars qualified for the playoffs. The franchises would not reach the post-season again until 1999 and 1994 respectively. By the time each franchise reached the playoffs again, they were known as the Carolina Hurricanes and the Dallas Stars, respectively.

Video replay was used to decide a playoff game for the first time in game six of the Detroit–Minnesota division semifinal. Sergei Fedorov of the Red Wings appeared to hit the crossbar behind Minnesota goalie Jon Casey during the first overtime, but after the North Stars iced the puck immediately afterward, referee Rob Shick called for a video review, which determined that the puck had entered the goal just below the crossbar and caromed off the frame at the back of the net. Fedorov was awarded the goal, giving the Red Wings a series-tying victory.

== Playoff seeds ==
The top four teams in each division qualified for the playoffs, as follows:

=== Prince of Wales Conference ===
==== Adams Division ====
1. Montreal Canadiens, Adams Division champions – 93 points
2. Boston Bruins – 84 points
3. Buffalo Sabres – 74 points
4. Hartford Whalers – 65 points

==== Patrick Division ====
1. New York Rangers, Patrick Division champions, Prince of Wales Conference regular season champions, Presidents' Trophy winners – 105 points
2. Washington Capitals – 98 points
3. Pittsburgh Penguins – 87 points (39 wins)
4. New Jersey Devils – 87 points (38 wins)

=== Clarence Campbell Conference ===
==== Norris Division ====
1. Detroit Red Wings, Norris Division champions, Clarence Campbell Conference regular season champions – 98 points
2. Chicago Blackhawks – 87 points
3. St. Louis Blues – 83 points
4. Minnesota North Stars – 70 points

==== Smythe Division ====
1. Vancouver Canucks, Smythe Division champions – 96 points
2. Los Angeles Kings – 84 points
3. Edmonton Oilers – 82 points
4. Winnipeg Jets – 81 points

== Playoff bracket ==
In the division semifinals, the fourth seeded team in each division played against the division winner from their division. The other series matched the second and third place teams from the divisions. The two winning teams from each division's semifinals then met in the division finals. The two division winners of each conference then played in the conference finals. The two conference winners then advanced to the Stanley Cup Final.

In each round, teams competed in a best-of-seven series following a 2–2–1–1–1 format (scores in the bracket indicate the number of games won in each best-of-seven series). Home ice advantage was awarded to the team that had the better regular season record, and played at home for games one and two (and games five and seven, if necessary); the other team then played at home for games three and four (and game six, if necessary).

Division semifinals	Division finals
A1	Montreal	4
A4	Hartford	3
A1	Montreal	0
A2	Boston	4
A2	Boston	4
A3	Buffalo	3
Prince of Wales Conference
P1	NY Rangers	4
P4	New Jersey	3
P1	NY Rangers	2
P3	Pittsburgh	4
P2	Washington	3
P3	Pittsburgh	4
N1	Detroit	4
N4	Minnesota	3
N1	Detroit	0
N2	Chicago	4
N2	Chicago	4
N3	St. Louis	2
Clarence Campbell Conference
S1	Vancouver	4
S4	Winnipeg	3
S1	Vancouver	2
S3	Edmonton	4
S2	Los Angeles	2
S3	Edmonton	4

Conference finals
A2	Boston	0
P3	Pittsburgh	4
N2	Chicago	4
S3	Edmonton	0

Stanley Cup Final
P3	Pittsburgh	4
N2	Chicago	0

== Division semifinals ==
=== Prince of Wales Conference ===
==== (A1) Montreal Canadiens vs. (A4) Hartford Whalers ====
This was the fifth playoff series meeting between these two teams. Montreal won all four prior playoff meetings, including their most recent meeting in the 1989 Adams Division Semifinals in a four-game sweep. This was the final time that the Hartford Whalers qualified for the playoffs; the next time that this franchise made the playoffs was in 1999 as the Carolina Hurricanes. Game six was the final playoff game played at the Hartford Civic Center.

April 19	Hartford Whalers	0–2	Montreal Canadiens	Montreal Forum	Recap
No scoring		First period	16:18 – pp – Gilbert Dionne (1)
No scoring		Second period	No scoring
No scoring		Third period	15:55 – Gilbert Dionne (2)
Frank Pietrangelo 28 saves / 30 shots		Goalie stats	Patrick Roy 32 saves / 32 shots

April 21	Hartford Whalers	2–5	Montreal Canadiens	Montreal Forum	Recap
John Cullen (1) – pp – 07:16		First period	02:46 – pp – Brent Gilchrist (1)
Randy Cunneyworth (1) – 15:07		Second period	10:54 – Brent Gilchrist (2); 12:31 – pp – Kirk Muller (1); 15:42 – Guy Carbonneau (1)
No scoring		Third period	19:45 – pp – en – Eric Desjardins (1)
Frank Pietrangelo 23 saves / 27 shots		Goalie stats	Patrick Roy 15 saves / 17 shots

April 23	Montreal Canadiens	2–5	Hartford Whalers	Hartford Civic Center	Recap
Patrice Brisebois (1) – pp – 17:52		First period	No scoring
No scoring		Second period	04:29 – Zarley Zalapski (1); 10:19 – sh – Murray Craven (1); 19:09 – John Cullen (2)
Stephan Lebeau (1) – pp – 19:23		Third period	02:38 – Murray Craven (2); 16:06 – pp – Patrick Poulin (1)
Patrick Roy 28 saves / 33 shots		Goalie stats	Frank Pietrangelo 32 saves / 34 shots

April 25	Montreal Canadiens	1–3	Hartford Whalers	Hartford Civic Center	Recap
No scoring		First period	12:18 – pp – Yvon Corriveau (1)
No scoring		Second period	07:26 – pp – Randy Cunneyworth (2)
Kirk Muller (2) – 07:28		Third period	19:41 – en – Murray Craven (3)
Patrick Roy 33 saves / 35 shots		Goalie stats	Frank Pietrangelo 24 saves / 25 shots

April 27	Hartford Whalers	4–7	Montreal Canadiens	Montreal Forum	Recap
Randy Cunneyworth (3) – sh – 04:03; Yvon Corriveau (2) – pp – 12:42		First period	19:47 – Sylvain Turgeon (1)
Andrew Cassels (1) – pp – 08:33		Second period	15:01 – sh – Kirk Muller (3); 15:37 – Brian Skrudland (1); 17:41 – pp – Kirk Muller (4); 19:55 – Patrice Brisebois (2)
Patrick Poulin (2) – 03:00		Third period	01:24 – John LeClair (1); 12:19 – Shayne Corson (1)
Frank Pietrangelo 23 saves / 29 shots Kay Whitmore 4 saves / 5 shots		Goalie stats	Patrick Roy 19 saves / 23 shots

April 29	Montreal Canadiens	1–2	OT	Hartford Whalers	Hartford Civic Center	Recap
No scoring		First period		No scoring
Denis Savard (1) – 04:39		Second period		01:48 – Zarley Zalapski (2)
No scoring		Third period		No scoring
No scoring		First overtime period		00:24 – Yvon Corriveau (3)
Patrick Roy 24 saves / 26 shots		Goalie stats		Frank Pietrangelo 42 saves / 43 shots

May 1	Hartford Whalers	2–3	2OT	Montreal Canadiens	Montreal Forum	Recap
No scoring		First period		06:08 – pp – Mathieu Schneider (1); 11:07 – Gilbert Dionne (3)
Andrew Cassels (2) – 08:13; Geoff Sanderson (1) – 15:36		Second period		No scoring
No scoring		Third period		No scoring
No scoring		Second overtime period		05:26 – Russ Courtnall (1)
Frank Pietrangelo 53 saves / 56 shots		Goalie stats		Patrick Roy 39 saves / 41 shots

Montreal won series 4–3

==== (A2) Boston Bruins vs. (A3) Buffalo Sabres ====
This was the fifth playoff series meeting between these two teams. Boston won all four prior playoff meetings, including their most recent meeting in the 1989 Adams Division Semifinals in five games.

In game seven, Dave Reid scored the game-winning goal with eight-and-a-half minutes left to send the Bruins to the next round.

April 19	Buffalo Sabres	3–2	Boston Bruins	Boston Garden	Recap
Petr Svoboda (1) – sh – 14:46		First period	No scoring
Pat LaFontaine (1) – pp – 02:28; Doug Bodger (1) – pp – 07:02		Second period	No scoring
No scoring		Third period	01:44 – Adam Oates (1); 05:10 – pp – Vladimir Ruzicka (1)
Tom Draper 36 saves / 38 shots		Goalie stats	Andy Moog 27 saves / 30 shots

April 21	Buffalo Sabres	2–3	OT	Boston Bruins	Boston Garden	Recap
No scoring		First period		07:00 – pp – Joe Juneau (1); 13:22 – Dave Reid (1)
Pat LaFontaine (2) – pp – 09:12		Second period		No scoring
Wayne Presley (1) – 08:32		Third period		No scoring
No scoring		First overtime period		11:14 – Adam Oates (2)
Tom Draper 39 saves / 42 shots		Goalie stats		Andy Moog 19 saves / 21 shots

April 23	Boston Bruins	3–2	Buffalo Sabres	Buffalo Memorial Auditorium	Recap
Ted Donato (1) – 03:30; Ray Bourque (1) – pp – 11:13		First period	No scoring
Adam Oates (3) – pp – 19:21		Second period	03:05 – Randy Wood (1); 15:00 – pp – Pat LaFontaine (3)
No scoring		Third period	No scoring
Andy Moog 21 saves / 23 shots		Goalie stats	Tom Draper 28 saves / 31 shots

April 25	Boston Bruins	5–4	OT	Buffalo Sabres	Buffalo Memorial Auditorium	Recap
Glen Wesley (1) – 03:30; Adam Oates (4) – pp – 11:44; Gord Murphy (1) – 13:59		First period		04:10 – Dale Hawerchuk (1); 06:22 – pp – Pat LaFontaine (4)
Joe Juneau (2) – 02:38		Second period		14:46 – Dave Andreychuk (1)
No scoring		Third period		00:55 – Wayne Presley (2)
Ted Donato (2) – 02:08		First overtime period		No scoring
Andy Moog 27 saves / 31 shots		Goalie stats		Tom Draper 14 saves / 19 shots

April 27	Buffalo Sabres	2–0	Boston Bruins	Boston Garden	Recap
Pat LaFontaine (5) – 11:48		First period	No scoring
Dave Hannan (1) – pp – 14:54		Second period	No scoring
No scoring		Third period	No scoring
Tom Draper 28 saves / 28 shots		Goalie stats	Andy Moog 20 saves / 22 shots Rejean Lemelin 10 saves / 10 shots

April 29	Boston Bruins	3–9	Buffalo Sabres	Buffalo Memorial Auditorium	Recap
No scoring		First period	05:28 – Wayne Presley (3); 11:01 – pp – Doug Bodger (2)
Brent Hughes (1) – 08:05		Second period	03:39 – Pat LaFontaine (6); 05:32 – Brad May (1); 07:19 – Colin Patterson (1); 10:17 – pp – Pat LaFontaine (7)
Ray Bourque (2) – pp – 07:22; Brent Hughes (2) – 12:22		Third period	18:00 – en – Randy Wood (2); 19:27 – pp – Dave Hannan (2); 19:48 – pp – Bob Corkum (1)
Rejean Lemelin 10 saves / 13 shots Andy Moog 16 saves / 21 shots		Goalie stats	Tom Draper 18 saves / 21 shots

May 1	Buffalo Sabres	2–3	Boston Bruins	Boston Garden	Recap
No scoring		First period	17:20 – Glen Murray (1)
Pat LaFontaine (8) – sh – 02:07		Second period	No scoring
Dale Hawerchuk (2) – 04:38		Third period	02:55 – Stephen Leach (1); 11:40 – Dave Reid (2)
Tom Draper 19 saves / 22 shots		Goalie stats	Andy Moog 27 saves / 29 shots

Boston won series 4–3

==== (P1) New York Rangers vs. (P4) New Jersey Devils ====
This was the first playoff series meeting between these two teams.

April 19	New Jersey Devils	1–2	New York Rangers	Madison Square Garden	Recap
No scoring		First period	02:06 – Darren Turcotte (1)
No scoring		Second period	No scoring
Zdeno Ciger (1) – 12:31		Third period	05:12 – Mike Gartner (1)
Chris Terreri 36 saves / 38 shots		Goalie stats	John Vanbiesbrouck 26 saves / 27 shots

April 21	New Jersey Devils	7–3	New York Rangers	Madison Square Garden	Recap
Kevin Todd (1) – 16:37		First period	09:04 – sh – Mark Messier (1)
Peter Stastny (1) – 01:22; Claude Lemieux (1) – 17:54; Laurie Boschman (1) – 18:50		Second period	04:18 – Brian Leetch (1)
Bill Guerin (1) – 00:32; Claude Lemieux (2) – pp – 11:32; Randy McKay (1) – pp – 13:59		Third period	10:59 – sh – Mark Messier (2)
Chris Terreri 26 saves / 29 shots		Goalie stats	John Vanbiesbrouck 22 saves / 29 shots

April 23	New York Rangers	1–3	New Jersey Devils	Brendan Byrne Arena	Recap
Mark Messier (3) – pp – 13:18		First period	08:50 – Stephane Richer (1); 16:14 – pp – Scott Stevens (1)
No scoring		Second period	01:25 – Claude Vilgrain (1)
No scoring		Third period	No scoring
Mike Richter 15 saves / 18 shots		Goalie stats	Chris Terreri 34 saves / 35 shots

April 25	New York Rangers	3–0	New Jersey Devils	Brendan Byrne Arena	Recap
No scoring		First period	No scoring
No scoring		Second period	No scoring
Jan Erixon (1) – 04:14; Paul Broten (1) – 08:39; Mike Gartner (2) – en – 18:51		Third period	No scoring
Mike Richter 33 saves / 33 shots		Goalie stats	Chris Terreri 25 saves / 27 shots

April 27	New Jersey Devils	5–8	New York Rangers	Madison Square Garden	Recap
No scoring		First period	10:41 – Mike Gartner (3); 18:41 – pp – Mike Gartner (4)
Kevin Todd (2) – 12:03; Alexei Kasatonov (1) – 14:59		Second period	02:57 – Joey Kocur (1); 07:14 – pp – Mike Gartner (5); 07:56 – pp – Doug Weight (1)
Scott Stevens (2) – pp – 02:46; Valeri Zelepukin (1) – 03:38; Bill Guerin (2) – 07:57		Third period	07:30 – Kris King (1); 13:22 – Adam Graves (1); 15:49 – Adam Graves (2)
Chris Terreri 10 saves / 15 shots Martin Brodeur 12 saves / 15 shots		Goalie stats	Mike Richter 43 saves / 48 shots

April 29	New York Rangers	3–5	New Jersey Devils	Brendan Byrne Arena	Recap
Tony Amonte (1) – pp – 17:37		First period	03:57 – Peter Stastny (2)
Tie Domi (1) – 04:09; Brian Leetch (2) – pp – 15:03		Second period	08:49 – Claude Lemieux (3); 11:10 – pp – Kevin Todd (3); 15:43 – Zdeno Ciger (2)
No scoring		Third period	13:32 – Peter Stastny (3)
Mike Richter 21 saves / 26 shots		Goalie stats	Chris Terreri 27 saves / 30 shots

May 1	New Jersey Devils	4–8	New York Rangers	Madison Square Garden	Recap
Tommy Albelin (1) – 03:58		First period	02:30 – sh – Darren Turcotte (2); 09:38 – pp – Mike Gartner (6); 12:33 – pp – Adam Graves (3)
Bill Guerin (3) – 18:49		Second period	01:40 – Mark Messier (4); 02:38 – Adam Graves (4); 13:34 – sh – Brian Leetch (3)
Claude Lemieux (4) – 07:55; Pat Conacher (1) – sh – 10:10		Third period	14:36 – pp – Darren Turcotte (3); 18:11 – en – Mark Messier (5)
Chris Terreri 22 saves / 29 shots		Goalie stats	John Vanbiesbrouck 33 saves / 37 shots

New York won series 4–3

==== (P2) Washington Capitals vs. (P3) Pittsburgh Penguins ====
This was the second overall playoff meeting in as many years between these two teams. Pittsburgh won last year's Patrick Division Finals in five games.

April 19	Pittsburgh Penguins	1–3	Washington Capitals	Capital Centre	Recap
No scoring		First period	No scoring
Troy Loney (1) – 03:41		Second period	03:03 – Peter Bondra (1); 13:42 – John Druce (1)
No scoring		Third period	17:52 – Peter Bondra (2)
Tom Barrasso 28 saves / 31 shots		Goalie stats	Don Beaupre 32 saves / 33 shots

April 21	Pittsburgh Penguins	2–6	Washington Capitals	Capital Centre	Recap
Larry Murphy (1) – pp – 05:16; Kevin Stevens (1) – pp – 07:08		First period	10:04 – pp – Dmitri Khristich (1); 13:42 – Peter Bondra (3); 19:39 – pp – Michal Pivonka (1)
No scoring		Second period	02:49 – Sylvain Cote (1); 09:47 – pp – Dino Ciccarelli (1)
No scoring		Third period	06:13 – Kelly Miller (1)
Tom Barrasso 25 saves / 31 shots		Goalie stats	Don Beaupre 33 saves / 35 shots

April 23	Washington Capitals	4–6	Pittsburgh Penguins	Civic Arena	Recap
Kevin Hatcher (1) – sh – 01:33; Dmitri Khristich (2) – pp – 17:47		First period	06:27 – Phil Bourque (1)
No scoring		Second period	01:46 – pp – Joe Mullen (1); 07:35 – pp – Jaromir Jagr (1); 17:18 – Mario Lemieux (1); 19:07 – pp – Mario Lemieux (2)
Al Iafrate (1) – pp – 13:57; Kevin Hatcher (2) – 17:48		Third period	19:09 – en – Mario Lemieux (3)
Don Beaupre 23 saves / 28 shots		Goalie stats	Tom Barrasso 30 saves / 34 shots

April 25	Washington Capitals	7–2	Pittsburgh Penguins	Civic Arena	Recap
Todd Krygier (1) – 04:39; Dino Ciccarelli (2) – 07:22; Dmitri Khristich (3) – pp – 19:29		First period	No scoring
No scoring		Second period	No scoring
Dino Ciccarelli (3) – 01:35; Dino Ciccarelli (4) – 06:17; Peter Bondra (4) – 06:34; Dino Ciccarelli (5) – 19:16		Third period	05:25 – Mario Lemieux (4); 12:45 – Bryan Trottier (1)
Don Beaupre 31 saves / 33 shots		Goalie stats	Tom Barrasso 16 saves / 19 shots Ken Wregget 12 saves / 16 shots

April 27	Pittsburgh Penguins	5–2	Washington Capitals	Capital Centre	Recap
Bryan Trottier (2) – 02:43		First period	12:36 – Todd Krygier (2)
Bob Errey (1) – 10:16; Larry Murphy (2) – pp – 17:32		Second period	07:53 – Al Iafrate (2)
Jaromir Jagr (2) – 06:59; Bob Errey (2) – en – 19:10		Third period	No scoring
Tom Barrasso 21 saves / 23 shots		Goalie stats	Don Beaupre 20 saves / 24 shots

April 29	Washington Capitals	4–6	Pittsburgh Penguins	Civic Arena	Recap
Dale Hunter (1) – 12:30; Peter Bondra (5) – 15:19; Peter Bondra (6) – pp – 18:19		First period	02:48 – Kevin Stevens (2); 05:05 – pp – Kevin Stevens (3)
Al Iafrate (3) – 03:55		Second period	09:10 – Joe Mullen (2); 11:01 – pp – Phil Bourque (2); 18:19 – pp – Mario Lemieux (5)
No scoring		Third period	14:41 – pp – Mario Lemieux (6)
Don Beaupre 33 saves / 39 shots		Goalie stats	Tom Barrasso 25 saves / 29 shots

May 1	Pittsburgh Penguins	3–1	Washington Capitals	Capital Centre	Recap
Mario Lemieux (7) – sh – 14:01		First period	No scoring
Jaromir Jagr (3) – pp – 09:40		Second period	00:24 – Al Iafrate (4)
Joe Mullen (3) – en – 19:27		Third period	No scoring
Tom Barrasso 18 saves / 19 shots		Goalie stats	Don Beaupre 18 saves / 20 shots

Pittsburgh won series 4–3

=== Clarence Campbell Conference ===
==== (N1) Detroit Red Wings vs. (N4) Minnesota North Stars ====
This was the first playoff meeting between these two teams.

This was the final playoff series played by the Minnesota North Stars. The next time that the Stars franchise made the playoffs was in 1994 when they were known as the Dallas Stars. Game six was the final playoff game played at the Met Center.

April 18	Minnesota North Stars	4–3	Detroit Red Wings	Joe Louis Arena	Recap
David Shaw (1) – pp – 14:32		First period	12:50 – sh – Sergei Fedorov (1)
Bobby Smith (1) – pp – 12:30		Second period	18:02 – Sergei Fedorov (2); 19:45 – Steve Yzerman (1)
Jim Johnson (1) – 03:57; Brian Bellows (1) – 13:45		Third period	No scoring
Jon Casey 23 saves / 26 shots		Goalie stats	Tim Cheveldae 25 saves / 29 shots

April 20	Minnesota North Stars	4–2	Detroit Red Wings	Joe Louis Arena	Recap
Mike Modano (1) – pp – 03:49; Dave Gagner (1) – pp – 18:35		First period	15:13 – Paul Ysebaert (1)
Derrick Smith (1) – 07:30		Second period	No scoring
Gaetan Duchesne (1) – en – 19:52		Third period	00:41 – Alan Kerr (1)
Jon Casey 29 saves / 31 shots		Goalie stats	Tim Cheveldae 16 saves / 19 shots

April 22	Detroit Red Wings	5–4	OT	Minnesota North Stars	Met Center	Recap
Sergei Fedorov (3) – sh – 15:06; Nicklas Lidstrom (1) – pp – 18:14		First period		01:11 – Mike Modano (2); 09:14 – pp – Dave Gagner (2)
Jimmy Carson (1) – 11:58		Second period		05:39 – Neal Broten (1); 08:04 – Brian Bellows (2)
Ray Sheppard (1) – pp – 16:28		Third period		No scoring
Yves Racine (1) – 01:15		First overtime period		No scoring
Tim Cheveldae 14 saves / 18 shots Vincent Riendeau 7 saves / 7 shots		Goalie stats		Jon Casey 35 saves / 40 shots

April 24	Detroit Red Wings	4–5	Minnesota North Stars	Met Center	Recap
Ray Sheppard (2) – pp – 03:48; Ray Sheppard (3) – 10:25; Steve Chiasson (1) – pp – 16:38		First period	07:05 – Mark Tinordi (1)
Ray Sheppard (4) – 15:08		Second period	11:51 – Mike Modano (3); 16:50 – David Shaw (2); 18:43 – pp – Brian Bellows (3)
No scoring		Third period	11:27 – Todd Elik (1)
Vincent Riendeau 19 saves / 23 shots Tim Cheveldae 5 saves / 6 shots		Goalie stats	Jon Casey 36 saves / 40 shots

April 26	Minnesota North Stars	0–3	Detroit Red Wings	Joe Louis Arena	Recap
No scoring		First period	13:33 – sh – Steve Yzerman (2)
No scoring		Second period	No scoring
No scoring		Third period	13:42 – Mike Sillinger (1); 18:51 – en – Jimmy Carson (2)
Jon Casey 21 saves / 23 shots		Goalie stats	Tim Cheveldae 22 saves / 22 shots

April 28	Detroit Red Wings	1–0	OT	Minnesota North Stars	Met Center	Recap
No scoring		First period		No scoring
No scoring		Second period		No scoring
No scoring		Third period		No scoring
Sergei Fedorov (4) – 16:13		First overtime period		No scoring
Tim Cheveldae 34 saves / 34 shots		Goalie stats		Jon Casey 33 saves / 34 shots

April 30	Minnesota North Stars	2–5	Detroit Red Wings	Joe Louis Arena	Recap
No scoring		First period	No scoring
No scoring		Second period	11:04 – pp – Sergei Fedorov (5); 14:07 – Alan Kerr (2); 17:57 – Gerard Gallant (1)
Brian Bellows (4) – pp – 03:50; Mike Craig (1) – 19:09		Third period	07:35 – Bob Probert (1); 16:53 – Shawn Burr (1)
Jon Casey 26 saves / 31 shots		Goalie stats	Tim Cheveldae 29 saves / 31 shots

Detroit won series 4–3

==== (N2) Chicago Blackhawks vs. (N3) St. Louis Blues ====
This was the eighth playoff series meeting between these two teams. Chicago won six of the previous seven series, including their most recent meeting in the 1990 Norris Division Finals in seven games.

April 18	St. Louis Blues	1–3	Chicago Blackhawks	Chicago Stadium	Recap
Dave Christian (1) – 03:24		First period	No scoring
No scoring		Second period	15:08 – Brian Noonan (1); 19:23 – Jocelyn Lemieux (1)
No scoring		Third period	00:30 – pp – Brian Noonan (2)
Curtis Joseph 32 saves / 35 shots		Goalie stats	Ed Belfour 33 saves / 34 shots

April 20	St. Louis Blues	5–3	Chicago Blackhawks	Chicago Stadium	Recap
Stephane Quintal (1) – pp – 02:06; Ron Sutter (1) – pp – 07:48		First period	04:03 – pp – Chris Chelios (1); 05:29 – pp – Chris Chelios (2); 16:37 – Tony Horacek (1)
Brett Hull (1) – sh – 05:23; Jeff Brown (1) – 16:42		Second period	No scoring
Dave Christian (2) – en – 19:39		Third period	No scoring
Curtis Joseph 31 saves / 34 shots		Goalie stats	Ed Belfour 7 saves / 11 shots Dominik Hasek 7 saves / 7 shots

April 22	Chicago Blackhawks	4–5	2OT	St. Louis Blues	St. Louis Arena	Recap
Jeremy Roenick (1) – pp – 12:42; Mike Hudson (1) – 14:14; Igor Kravchuk (1) – pp – 19:38		First period		01:41 – pp – Nelson Emerson (1); 09:17 – pp – Nelson Emerson (2)
Dirk Graham (1) – 00:42		Second period		19:20 – Dave Christian (3)
No scoring		Third period		13:03 – Garth Butcher (1)
No scoring		Second overtime period		03:33 – Brett Hull (2)
Ed Belfour 2 saves / 3 shots Dominik Hasek 34 saves / 38 shots		Goalie stats		Curtis Joseph 43 saves / 47 shots

April 24	Chicago Blackhawks	5–3	St. Louis Blues	St. Louis Arena	Recap
Jeremy Roenick (2) – pp – 11:29; Brent Sutter (1) – pp – 16:09		First period	07:44 – pp – Brett Hull (3)
Stephane Matteau (1) – sh – 01:27		Second period	14:57 – pp – Curt Giles (1); 16:57 – pp – Brendan Shanahan (1)
Brian Noonan (3) – 05:04; Mike Hudson (2) – 15:15		Third period	No scoring
Ed Belfour 16 saves / 19 shots		Goalie stats	Curtis Joseph 32 saves / 37 shots

April 26	St. Louis Blues	4–6	Chicago Blackhawks	Chicago Stadium	Recap
Philippe Bozon (1) – 01:57		First period	10:07 – Stephane Matteau (2); 17:12 – Steve Larmer (1)
Brett Hull (4) – 00:36; Brendan Shanahan (2) – 02:05		Second period	10:54 – pp – Steve Larmer (2); 14:45 – Brad Lauer (1)
Jeff Brown (2) – 15:56		Third period	02:29 – Chris Chelios (3); 15:11 – Jocelyn Lemieux (2)
Curtis Joseph 34 saves / 40 shots		Goalie stats	Ed Belfour 20 saves / 24 shots

April 28	Chicago Blackhawks	2–1	St. Louis Blues	St. Louis Arena	Recap
Jeremy Roenick (3) – pp – 08:22		First period	No scoring
Jeremy Roenick (4) – 07:54		Second period	12:35 – Nelson Emerson (3)
No scoring		Third period	No scoring
Ed Belfour 38 saves / 39 shots		Goalie stats	Curtis Joseph 22 saves / 24 shots

Chicago won series 4–2

==== (S1) Vancouver Canucks vs. (S4) Winnipeg Jets ====
This was the first playoff series between these two teams.

April 18	Winnipeg Jets	3–2	Vancouver Canucks	Pacific Coliseum	Recap
Fredrik Olausson (1) – pp – 12:15		First period	10:35 – Igor Larionov (1)
No scoring		Second period	17:13 – Pavel Bure (1)
Evgeny Davydov (1) – pp – 00:18; Eddie Olczyk (1) – 03:15		Third period	No scoring
Rick Tabaracci 17 saves / 19 shots		Goalie stats	Kirk McLean 19 saves / 22 shots

April 20	Winnipeg Jets	2–3	Vancouver Canucks	Pacific Coliseum	Recap
No scoring		First period	08:54 – Tom Fergus (1)
Keith Tkachuk (1) – 01:39		Second period	10:52 – pp – Trevor Linden (1)
Aaron Broten (1) – 02:53		Third period	08:47 – Jyrki Lumme (1)
Rick Tabaracci 38 saves / 41 shots		Goalie stats	Kirk McLean 26 saves / 28 shots

April 22	Vancouver Canucks	2–4	Winnipeg Jets	Winnipeg Arena	Recap
No scoring		First period	07:39 – Randy Carlyle (1); 19:46 – pp – Pat Elynuik (1)
No scoring		Second period	10:12 – Lucien DeBlois (1)
Robert Kron (1) – sh – 07:26; Jim Sandlak (1) – 12:39		Third period	01:01 – pp – Thomas Steen (1)
Kirk McLean 33 saves / 37 shots		Goalie stats	Rick Tabaracci 24 saves / 26 shots

April 24	Vancouver Canucks	1–3	Winnipeg Jets	Winnipeg Arena	Recap
No scoring		First period	08:52 – Evgeny Davydov (2)
No scoring		Second period	06:28 – pp – Phil Housley (1)
Tom Fergus (2) – 08:47		Third period	00:37 – pp – Thomas Steen (2)
Kirk McLean 23 saves / 26 shots		Goalie stats	Rick Tabaracci 30 saves / 31 shots

April 26	Winnipeg Jets	2–8	Vancouver Canucks	Pacific Coliseum	Recap
No scoring		First period	17:30 – Pavel Bure (2); 19:56 – pp – Jim Sandlak (2)
Eddie Olczyk (2) – 16:24; Aaron Broten (2) – 17:21		Second period	00:35 – Dave Babych (1); 02:28 – pp – Jyrki Lumme (2); 07:20 – Petr Nedved (1); 08:59 – Doug Lidster (1)
No scoring		Third period	01:49 – Jim Sandlak (3); 10:22 – Geoff Courtnall (1)
Rick Tabaracci 21 saves / 26 shots Bob Essensa 14 saves / 17 shots		Goalie stats	Kirk McLean 24 saves / 26 shots

April 28	Vancouver Canucks	8–3	Winnipeg Jets	Winnipeg Arena	Recap
Cliff Ronning (1) – 05:35; Pavel Bure (3) – 08:42		First period	05:03 – Keith Tkachuk (2)
Cliff Ronning (2) – 00:34; Trevor Linden (2) – pp – 10:27; Tom Fergus (3) – 11:27		Second period	19:31 – pp – Pat Elynuik (2)
Pavel Bure (4) – 02:50; Tom Fergus (4) – 10:23; Pavel Bure (5) – 11:02		Third period	00:17 – Keith Tkachuk (3)
Kirk McLean 23 saves / 26 shots		Goalie stats	Rick Tabaracci 28 saves / 36 shots

April 30	Winnipeg Jets	0–5	Vancouver Canucks	Pacific Coliseum	Recap
No scoring		First period	09:25 – Tom Fergus (5)
No scoring		Second period	11:40 – Trevor Linden (3); 17:09 – pp – Geoff Courtnall (2)
No scoring		Third period	01:25 – Geoff Courtnall (3); 19:20 – Geoff Courtnall (4)
Rick Tabaracci 28 saves / 33 shots		Goalie stats	Kirk McLean 33 saves / 33 shots

Vancouver won series 4–3

==== (S2) Los Angeles Kings vs. (S3) Edmonton Oilers ====
This was the seventh playoff meeting between these two teams and were meeting for the fourth straight year. Edmonton won four of the previous six meetings, including last year's Smythe Division Finals in six games. The Kings and the Oilers did not meet again in the playoffs until 2022.

April 18	Edmonton Oilers	3–1	Los Angeles Kings	Great Western Forum	Recap
Vincent Damphousse (1) – pp – 04:14; Brian Glynn (1) – 15:45		First period	No scoring
Brian Glynn (2) – pp – 09:44		Second period	18:15 – Rob Blake (1)
No scoring		Third period	No scoring
Bill Ranford 24 saves / 25 shots		Goalie stats	Kelly Hrudey 24 saves / 27 shots

April 20	Edmonton Oilers	5–8	Los Angeles Kings	Great Western Forum	Recap
Bernie Nicholls (1) – pp – 06:35; David Maley (1) – 06:59		First period	00:46 – pp – Paul Coffey (1); 11:23 – Tony Granato (1); 14:53 – pp – Paul Coffey (2)
Bernie Nicholls (2) – pp – 08:04; Joe Murphy (1) – 09:26		Second period	11:53 – Marty McSorley (1); 12:55 – Rob Blake (2); 19:13 – Charlie Huddy (1)
Josef Beranek (1) – pp – 12:54		Third period	04:41 – pp – Jari Kurri (1); 07:00 – Mike Donnelly (1)
Bill Ranford 23 saves / 29 shots Ron Tugnutt 8 saves / 10 shots		Goalie stats	Kelly Hrudey 36 saves / 41 shots

April 22	Los Angeles Kings	3–4	Edmonton Oilers	Northlands Coliseum	Recap
Dave Taylor (1) – 03:29; Jay Miller (1) – 12:46		First period	14:53 – pp – Bernie Nicholls (3)
Luc Robitaille (1) – 13:37		Second period	03:51 – Vincent Damphousse (2)
No scoring		Third period	01:23 – pp – Joe Murphy (2); 12:37 – pp – Bernie Nicholls (4)
Kelly Hrudey 36 saves / 40 shots		Goalie stats	Bill Ranford 23 saves / 26 shots

April 24	Los Angeles Kings	4–3	Edmonton Oilers	Northlands Coliseum	Recap
Luc Robitaille (2) – pp – 19:00		First period	13:02 – pp – Scott Mellanby (1)
No scoring		Second period	01:02 – Dave Manson (1)
Paul Coffey (3) – 11:12; Paul Coffey (4) – pp – 13:02; Luc Robitaille (3) – 13:53		Third period	16:13 – Vincent Damphousse (3)
Kelly Hrudey 20 saves / 23 shots		Goalie stats	Bill Ranford 28 saves / 32 shots

April 26	Edmonton Oilers	5–2	Los Angeles Kings	Great Western Forum	Recap
No scoring		First period	No scoring
Esa Tikkanen (1) – 00:47		Second period	04:02 – Wayne Gretzky (1); 18:23 – pp – Wayne Gretzky (2)
Vincent Damphousse (4) – 02:55; Esa Tikkanen (2) – pp – 13:37; Esa Tikkanen (3) – 18:45; Bernie Nicholls (5) – en – 19:48		Third period	No scoring
Bill Ranford 42 saves / 44 shots		Goalie stats	Kelly Hrudey 20 saves / 24 shots

April 28	Los Angeles Kings	0–3	Edmonton Oilers	Northlands Coliseum	Recap
No scoring		First period	01:39 – Josef Beranek (2); 17:15 – Joe Murphy (3)
No scoring		Second period	02:41 – Martin Gelinas (1)
No scoring		Third period	No scoring
Kelly Hrudey 21 saves / 24 shots		Goalie stats	Bill Ranford 26 saves / 26 shots

Edmonton won series 4–2

== Division finals ==
=== Prince of Wales Conference ===
==== (A1) Montreal Canadiens vs. (A2) Boston Bruins ====
This was the 27th playoff series meeting between these two teams. Montreal lead the all-time playoff meetings 21–5 against Boston. This was also the ninth consecutive year Boston and Montreal had met in the playoffs, an NHL record that still stands. Boston won last year's Adams Division Finals in seven games.

May 3	Boston Bruins	6–4	Montreal Canadiens	Montreal Forum	Recap
Gord Hynes (1) – 04:09; Stephen Leach (2) – 14:25		First period	16:15 – Sean Hill (1)
Dave Poulin (1) – 06:10; Joe Juneau (3) – pp – 10:38; Stephen Leach (3) – 18:59		Second period	05:36 – Eric Desjardins (2); 18:16 – Denis Savard (2)
Ray Bourque (3) – 18:46		Third period	05:40 – Mike McPhee (1)
Andy Moog 24 saves / 28 shots		Goalie stats	Patrick Roy 21 saves / 27 shots Andre Racicot 1 save / 1 shots

May 5	Boston Bruins	3–2	OT	Montreal Canadiens	Montreal Forum	Recap
No scoring		First period		08:43 – Eric Desjardins (3)
Glen Murray (2) – pp – 19:02		Second period		No scoring
Dave Poulin (2) – 14:05		Third period		04:53 – Shayne Corson (2)
Peter Douris (1) – 03:12		First overtime period		No scoring
Andy Moog 20 saves / 22 shots		Goalie stats		Patrick Roy 21 saves / 24 shots

May 7	Montreal Canadiens	2–3	Boston Bruins	Boston Garden	Recap
Mike Keane (1) – 01:32		First period	09:10 – Glen Murray (3); 19:55 – pp – Vladimir Ruzicka (2)
No scoring		Second period	01:35 – Jim Wiemer (1)
Denis Savard (3) – pp – 11:18		Third period	No scoring
Patrick Roy 21 saves / 24 shots		Goalie stats	Andy Moog 24 saves / 26 shots

May 9	Montreal Canadiens	0–2	Boston Bruins	Boston Garden	Recap
No scoring		First period	No scoring
No scoring		Second period	12:08 – pp – Dave Poulin (3)
No scoring		Third period	19:15 – en – Peter Douris (2)
Patrick Roy 29 saves / 30 shots		Goalie stats	Andy Moog 26 saves / 26 shots

Boston won series 4–0

==== (P1) New York Rangers vs. (P3) Pittsburgh Penguins ====
This was the second playoff meeting between these two teams. Pittsburgh won the only previous meeting in a four-game sweep in the 1989 Patrick Division Semifinals.

May 3	Pittsburgh Penguins	4–2	New York Rangers	Madison Square Garden	Recap
Troy Loney (2) – 13:56; Larry Murphy (3) – 15:22		First period	No scoring
Kevin Stevens (4) – pp – 02:00; Ron Francis (1) – 12:08		Second period	03:02 – Kris King (2); 10:24 – pp – Tony Amonte (2)
No scoring		Third period	No scoring
Tom Barrasso 35 saves / 37 shots		Goalie stats	John Vanbiesbrouck 22 saves / 26 shots

May 5	Pittsburgh Penguins	2–4	New York Rangers	Madison Square Garden	Recap
Kevin Stevens (5) – 01:29		First period	No scoring
Larry Murphy (4) – 16:13		Second period	13:53 – Brian Leetch (4)
No scoring		Third period	12:36 – Jeff Beukeboom (1); 14:36 – Kris King (3); 19:57 – en – Jeff Beukeboom (2)
Tom Barrasso 35 saves / 38 shots		Goalie stats	Mike Richter 24 saves / 26 shots

May 7	New York Rangers	6–5	OT	Pittsburgh Penguins	Civic Arena	Recap
Adam Graves (5) – 03:45; Tim Kerr (1) – pp – 04:36; Sergei Nemchinov (1) – 17:14		First period		11:00 – Kevin Stevens (6)
Mike Gartner (7) – 06:24		Second period		01:09 – Ron Francis (2); 13:06 – Ron Francis (3); 17:29 – pp – Larry Murphy (5)
Jan Erixon (2) – sh – 05:24		Third period		10:13 – Kevin Stevens (7)
Kris King (4) – 01:29		First overtime period		No scoring
Mike Richter 45 saves / 50 shots		Goalie stats		Tom Barrasso 26 saves / 32 shots

May 9	New York Rangers	4–5	OT	Pittsburgh Penguins	Civic Arena	Recap
Randy Gilhen (1) – 04:56; Tony Amonte (3) – 13:04		First period		13:28 – Mike Needham (1)
Mark Messier (6) – pp – 10:49		Second period		19:54 – pp – Ron Francis (4)
Mark Messier (7) – 00:46		Third period		10:37 – Ron Francis (5); 11:52 – Troy Loney (3)
No scoring		First overtime period		02:47 – pp – Ron Francis (6)
Mike Richter 21 saves / 25 shots John Vanbiesbrouck 10 saves / 11 shots		Goalie stats		Tom Barrasso 26 saves / 30 shots

May 11	Pittsburgh Penguins	3–2	New York Rangers	Madison Square Garden	Recap
Rick Tocchet (1) – pp – 01:15; Jaromir Jagr (4) – 07:04		First period	No scoring
No scoring		Second period	06:59 – pp – Darren Turcotte (4)
Jaromir Jagr (5) – 14:27		Third period	01:51 – Mike Gartner (8)
Tom Barrasso 32 saves / 34 shots		Goalie stats	John Vanbiesbrouck 21 saves / 24 shots

May 13	New York Rangers	1–5	Pittsburgh Penguins	Civic Arena	Recap
No scoring		First period	No scoring
Doug Weight (2) – 07:42		Second period	05:57 – pp – Rick Tocchet (2); 11:22 – Jaromir Jagr (6); 13:43 – Shawn McEachern (1)
No scoring		Third period	18:11 – en – Rick Tocchet (3); 19:19 – en – Ron Francis (7)
John Vanbiesbrouck 22 saves / 25 shots		Goalie stats	Tom Barrasso 33 saves / 34 shots

Pittsburgh won series 4–2

=== Clarence Campbell Conference ===
==== (N1) Detroit Red Wings vs. (N2) Chicago Blackhawks ====
This was the 13th playoff series meeting between these two teams. Entering the series, Chicago led the all-time meetings 7–5. Their most recent meeting was won by Chicago in six games in the 1989 Norris Division Semifinals.

May 2	Chicago Blackhawks	2–1	Detroit Red Wings	Joe Louis Arena	Recap
No scoring		First period	No scoring
Stephane Matteau (3) – pp – 05:30		Second period	16:24 – pp – Yves Racine (2)
Jocelyn Lemieux (3) – 13:33		Third period	No scoring
Ed Belfour 23 saves / 24 shots		Goalie stats	Tim Cheveldae 27 saves / 29 shots

May 4	Chicago Blackhawks	3–1	Detroit Red Wings	Joe Louis Arena	Recap
Jeremy Roenick (5) – 01:07; Greg Gilbert (1) – 14:13		First period	No scoring
Steve Larmer (3) – 09:22		Second period	No scoring
No scoring		Third period	04:08 – Steve Yzerman (3)
Ed Belfour 24 saves / 25 shots		Goalie stats	Tim Cheveldae 25 saves / 28 shots

May 6	Detroit Red Wings	4–5	Chicago Blackhawks	Chicago Stadium	Recap
No scoring		First period	08:01 – Jeremy Roenick (6); 08:31 – Dirk Graham (2)
Mike Sillinger (2) – 08:14; Ray Sheppard (5) – pp – 14:29		Second period	15:31 – Chris Chelios (4); 17:14 – pp – Steve Larmer (4)
Gerard Gallant (2) – 00:51; Ray Sheppard (6) – 02:09		Third period	15:13 – Dirk Graham (3)
Tim Cheveldae 23 saves / 28 shots		Goalie stats	Ed Belfour 20 saves / 24 shots

May 8	Detroit Red Wings	0–1	Chicago Blackhawks	Chicago Stadium	Recap
No scoring		First period	No scoring
No scoring		Second period	No scoring
No scoring		Third period	18:26 – Brent Sutter (2)
Tim Cheveldae 32 saves / 33 shots		Goalie stats	Ed Belfour 29 saves / 29 shots

Chicago won series 4–0

==== (S1) Vancouver Canucks vs. (S3) Edmonton Oilers ====
This was the second playoff series meeting between these two teams. Edmonton won the only previous meeting in a three-game sweep in the 1986 Smythe Division Semifinals. The Canucks and the Oilers did not meet again in the playoffs until 2024.

May 3	Edmonton Oilers	4–3	OT	Vancouver Canucks	Pacific Coliseum	Recap
No scoring		First period		14:33 – Geoff Courtnall (5)
Norm MacIver (1) – 10:55; Bernie Nicholls (6) – 15:28		Second period		05:59 – pp – Jim Sandlak (4)
Vincent Damphousse (5) – 14:55		Third period		12:45 – Pavel Bure (6)
Joe Murphy (4) – 08:36		First overtime period		No scoring
Bill Ranford 40 saves / 43 shots		Goalie stats		Kirk McLean 28 saves / 32 shots

May 4	Edmonton Oilers	0–4	Vancouver Canucks	Pacific Coliseum	Recap
No scoring		First period	12:30 – pp – Geoff Courtnall (6); 14:00 – pp – Igor Larionov (2); 17:43 – pp – Cliff Ronning (3)
No scoring		Second period	02:34 – Cliff Ronning (4)
No scoring		Third period	No scoring
Bill Ranford 12 saves / 15 shots Ron Tugnutt 23 saves / 24 shots		Goalie stats	Kirk McLean 14 saves / 14 shots

May 6	Vancouver Canucks	2–5	Edmonton Oilers	Northlands Coliseum	Recap
No scoring		First period	15:33 – Chris Joseph (1)
No scoring		Second period	04:27 – pp – Joe Murphy (5)
Cliff Ronning (5) – 03:37; Cliff Ronning (6) – en – 19:05		Third period	04:35 – Joe Murphy (6); 18:35 – pp – Joe Murphy (7); 19:40 – Brian Glynn (3)
Kirk McLean 27 saves / 31 shots		Goalie stats	Bill Ranford 20 saves / 22 shots

May 8	Vancouver Canucks	2–3	Edmonton Oilers	Northlands Coliseum	Recap
Adrien Plavsic (1) – 15:58		First period	14:11 – Petr Klima (1); 19:53 – Esa Tikkanen (4)
Dave Babych (2) – pp – 08:51		Second period	19:04 – Scott Mellanby (2)
No scoring		Third period	No scoring
Kirk McLean 30 saves / 33 shots		Goalie stats	Bill Ranford 30 saves / 32 shots

May 10	Edmonton Oilers	3–4	Vancouver Canucks	Pacific Coliseum	Recap
No scoring		First period	04:40 – Cliff Ronning (7); 13:34 – Trevor Linden (4)
Joe Murphy (8) – pp – 02:20; Dave Manson (2) – pp – 17:09; Mark Lamb (1) – 19:27		Second period	00:49 – Igor Larionov (3); 01:23 – Cliff Ronning (8)
No scoring		Third period	No scoring
Bill Ranford 29 saves / 33 shots		Goalie stats	Kirk McLean 22 saves / 25 shots

May 12	Vancouver Canucks	0–3	Edmonton Oilers	Northlands Coliseum	Recap
No scoring		First period	08:58 – sh – Craig MacTavish (1); 16:29 – Vincent Damphousse (6)
No scoring		Second period	No scoring
No scoring		Third period	18:58 – en – Esa Tikkanen (5)
Kirk McLean 29 saves / 31 shots		Goalie stats	Bill Ranford 26 saves / 26 shots

Edmonton won series 4–2

== Conference finals ==
=== Prince of Wales Conference final ===
==== (P3) Pittsburgh Penguins vs. (A2) Boston Bruins ====
This was the third playoff series meeting between these two teams. Boston won two of the previous three meetings. This was a rematch of last year's Prince of Wales Conference Final, which Pittsburgh won in six games.

May 17	Boston Bruins	3–4	OT	Pittsburgh Penguins	Civic Arena	Recap
Bob Sweeney (1) – sh – 05:40; Ted Donato (3) – 13:35		First period		03:26 – Bryan Trottier (3); 14:22 – Jock Callander (1)
Glen Wesley (2) – 19:16		Second period		No scoring
No scoring		Third period		12:27 – Shawn McEachern (2)
No scoring		First overtime period		09:44 – Jaromir Jagr (7)
Andy Moog 27 saves / 31 shots		Goalie stats		Tom Barrasso 38 saves / 41 shots

May 19	Boston Bruins	2–5	Pittsburgh Penguins	Civic Arena	Recap
Glen Murray (4) – 00:59		First period	06:02 – Troy Loney (4); 17:07 – Jaromir Jagr (8)
No scoring		Second period	11:35 – pp – Rick Tocchet (4)
Adam Oates (5) – pp – 09:43		Third period	12:47 – pp – Mario Lemieux (8); 19:59 – pp – en – Mario Lemieux (9)
Andy Moog 18 saves / 22 shots		Goalie stats	Tom Barrasso 18 saves / 20 shots

May 21	Pittsburgh Penguins	5–1	Boston Bruins	Boston Garden	Recap
Kevin Stevens (8) – 09:08; Kevin Stevens (9) – pp – 12:42; Kevin Stevens (10) – 15:03		First period	No scoring
Bryan Trottier (4) – 08:26		Second period	No scoring
Kevin Stevens (11) – 14:31		Third period	08:11 – Joe Juneau (4)
Tom Barrasso 30 saves / 31 shots		Goalie stats	Andy Moog 23 saves / 28 shots

May 23	Pittsburgh Penguins	5–1	Boston Bruins	Boston Garden	Recap
Jaromir Jagr (9) – 04:51; Mario Lemieux (10) – sh – 13:09		First period	No scoring
Paul Stanton (1) – 05:27; Mario Lemieux (11) – 13:58		Second period	No scoring
Dave Michayluk (1) – 19:49		Third period	05:53 – Stephen Leach (4)
Tom Barrasso 29 saves / 30 shots		Goalie stats	Andy Moog 20 saves / 25 shots

Pittsburgh won series 4–0

=== Clarence Campbell Conference final ===
==== (N2) Chicago Blackhawks vs. (S3) Edmonton Oilers ====
This was the fourth playoff series meeting between these two teams. Edmonton won all three previous meetings, the most recent of which they won in six games in the 1990 Clarence Campbell Conference Final.

May 16	Edmonton Oilers	2–8	Chicago Blackhawks	Chicago Stadium	Recap
Dave Manson (3) – 04:05; Craig MacTavish (2) – 17:24		First period	00:47 – Steve Larmer (5); 16:57 – Jeremy Roenick (7)
No scoring		Second period	02:51 – Mike Peluso (1); 03:20 – Jeremy Roenick (8); 04:17 – pp – Steve Smith (1)
No scoring		Third period	04:37 – Michel Goulet (1); 08:24 – Igor Kravchuk (2); 12:32 – Steve Larmer (6)
Bill Ranford 18 saves / 26 shots		Goalie stats	Ed Belfour 17 saves / 19 shots

May 18	Edmonton Oilers	2–4	Chicago Blackhawks	Chicago Stadium	Recap
Anatoli Semenov (1) – 08:04; Bernie Nicholls (7) – 11:30		First period	16:35 – pp – Steve Larmer (7)
No scoring		Second period	No scoring
No scoring		Third period	05:59 – Steve Larmer (8); 16:19 – Michel Goulet (2); 17:04 – Stephane Matteau (4)
Bill Ranford 41 saves / 45 shots		Goalie stats	Ed Belfour 12 saves / 14 shots

May 20	Chicago Blackhawks	4–3	OT	Edmonton Oilers	Northlands Coliseum	Recap
No scoring		First period		02:08 – Bernie Nicholls (8); 13:00 – Craig MacTavish (3)
Brian Noonan (4) – pp – 06:36; Rob Brown (1) – pp – 13:31; Chris Chelios (5) – 18:49		Second period		No scoring
No scoring		Third period		07:13 – Brian Glynn (4)
Jeremy Roenick (9) – 02:45		First overtime period		No scoring
Ed Belfour 21 saves / 24 shots		Goalie stats		Bill Ranford 25 saves / 29 shots

May 22	Chicago Blackhawks	5–1	Edmonton Oilers	Northlands Coliseum	Recap
Rob Brown (2) – 09:35		First period	No scoring
Jeremy Roenick (10) – pp – 04:59; Brian Noonan (5) – pp – 07:35; Mike Hudson (3) – 08:46; Brian Noonan (6) – 10:37		Second period	No scoring
No scoring		Third period	01:23 – Kelly Buchberger (1)
Ed Belfour 20 saves / 21 shots		Goalie stats	Bill Ranford 26 saves / 31 shots

Chicago won series 4–0

== Stanley Cup Final ==
This was the second playoff series meeting between these two teams. Chicago won the only previous meeting in a four-game sweep in the 1972 Stanley Cup Quarterfinals.

May 26	Chicago Blackhawks	4–5	Pittsburgh Penguins	Civic Arena	Recap
Chris Chelios (6) – pp – 06:34; Michel Goulet (3) – 13:17; Dirk Graham (4) – 13:43		First period	17:26 – pp – Phil Bourque (3)
Brent Sutter (3) – 11:36		Second period	15:24 – Rick Tocchet (5); 16:23 – Mario Lemieux (12)
No scoring		Third period	15:05 – Jaromir Jagr (10); 19:47 – pp – Mario Lemieux (13)
Ed Belfour 34 saves / 39 shots		Goalie stats	Tom Barrasso 30 saves / 34 shots

May 28	Chicago Blackhawks	1–3	Pittsburgh Penguins	Civic Arena	Recap
No scoring		First period	09:52 – pp – Bob Errey (3)
Bryan Marchment (1) – 10:24		Second period	12:55 – pp – Mario Lemieux (14); 15:23 – Mario Lemieux (15)
No scoring		Third period	No scoring
Ed Belfour 22 saves / 25 shots		Goalie stats	Tom Barrasso 18 saves / 19 shots

May 30	Pittsburgh Penguins	1–0	Chicago Blackhawks	Chicago Stadium	Recap
Kevin Stevens (12) – 15:26		First period	No scoring
No scoring		Second period	No scoring
No scoring		Third period	No scoring
Tom Barrasso 27 saves / 27 shots		Goalie stats	Ed Belfour 19 saves / 20 shots

June 1	Pittsburgh Penguins	6–5	Chicago Blackhawks	Chicago Stadium	Recap
Jaromir Jagr (11) – 01:37; Kevin Stevens (13) – 06:33; Mario Lemieux (16) – pp – 10:13		First period	06:21 – Dirk Graham (5); 06:51 – Dirk Graham (6); 16:18 – Dirk Graham (7)
Rick Tocchet (6) – 00:58		Second period	15:40 – Jeremy Roenick (11)
Larry Murphy (6) – 04:51; Ron Francis (8) – 07:59		Third period	11:18 – Jeremy Roenick (12)
Tom Barrasso 24 saves / 29 shots		Goalie stats	Ed Belfour 2 saves / 4 shots Dominik Hasek 21 saves / 25 shots

Pittsburgh won series 4–0

== Playoff statistics ==
=== Skaters ===
These are the top ten skaters based on points.

Player	Team	GP	G	A	Pts	+/–	PIM
Mario Lemieux	Pittsburgh Penguins	15	16	18	34	+6	2
Kevin Stevens	Pittsburgh Penguins	21	13	15	28	+2	28
Ron Francis	Pittsburgh Penguins	21	8	19	27	+8	6
Jaromir Jagr	Pittsburgh Penguins	21	11	13	24	+4	6
Joe Murphy	Edmonton Oilers	16	8	16	24	+2	12
Jeremy Roenick	Chicago Blackhawks	18	12	10	22	+11	12
Chris Chelios	Chicago Blackhawks	18	6	15	21	+19	37
Bernie Nicholls	Edmonton Oilers	16	8	11	19	+2	25
Rick Tocchet	Pittsburgh Penguins	14	6	13	19	0	24
Adam Oates	Boston Bruins	15	5	14	19	-6	4

=== Goaltenders ===
This is a combined table of the top five goaltenders based on goals against average and the top five goaltenders based on save percentage, with at least 420 minutes played. The table is sorted by GAA, and the criteria for inclusion are bolded.

Player	Team	GP	W	L	SA	GA	GAA	SV%	SO	TOI
Ed Belfour	Chicago Blackhawks	18	12	4	398	39	**2.47**	.902	1	948:47
Tim Cheveldae	Detroit Red Wings	11	3	7	277	25	**2.51**	**.910**	2	597:18
Kirk McLean	Vancouver Canucks	13	6	7	364	33	**2.52**	**.909**	2	784:35
Patrick Roy	Montreal Canadiens	11	4	7	312	30	**2.63**	.904	1	685:31
Tom Draper	Buffalo Sabres	7	3	4	201	19	**2.63**	**.905**	1	433:22

== See also ==
- List of Stanley Cup champions

Preceded by 1991 Stanley Cup playoffs	Stanley Cup playoffs	Succeeded by 1993 Stanley Cup playoffs
