= Rod Buskas =

Canadian ice hockey player (born 1961)

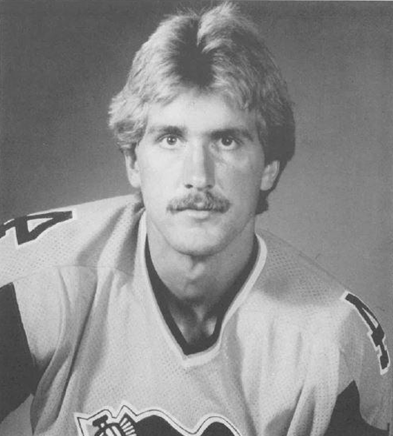
- Buskas in 1983 photo
- Born: January 7, 1961 (age 65) Wetaskiwin, Alberta, Canada
- Height: 6 ft 1 in (185 cm)
- Weight: 206 lb (93 kg; 14 st 10 lb)
- Position: Defence
- Shot: Right
- Played for: Pittsburgh Penguins; Vancouver Canucks; Los Angeles Kings; Chicago Blackhawks
- NHL draft: 112th overall, 1981; Pittsburgh Penguins
- Playing career: 1981–1995

Rod Dale Buskas (born January 7, 1961) is a Canadian former professional ice hockey defenceman who spent 11 seasons in the National Hockey League. A hard-nosed physical defender, Buskas is best known for his time with the Pittsburgh Penguins, where he was the club's all-time leader in penalty minutes at the time of his departure in 1990.

== Early life ==
Buskas was born on January 7, 1961, in Wetaskiwin, Alberta, and was raised in Medicine Hat, Alberta.

== Playing career ==
Buskas was selected in the 6th round (112th overall) of the 1981 NHL entry draft by the Penguins after a solid junior career with the Medicine Hat Tigers. After some seasoning in the minors, he made his NHL debut near the start of the 1982–83 season, and finished the year with 4 points and 102 penalty minutes in 41 games.

After another season split between Pittsburgh and the minors, Buskas established himself as a regular for the Penguins in 1984–85, and was a fixture on the club's blueline for the next five seasons. In 1986–87, he had his best offensive season, finishing the year with 3 goals and 15 assists for 18 points. In 1987–88, he led the Penguins with a career-high 206 penalty minutes, and midway through the 1988–89 season he broke Bryan Watson's club record of 872 penalty minutes. While the Penguins finished consistently near the bottom of the league for most of the 1980s, the maturing of superstar Mario Lemieux finally saw the team reach the playoffs in 1989, and Buskas appeared in the first 10 NHL playoff games of his career.

At the start of the 1989–90 campaign, Buskas was dealt to the Vancouver Canucks for a draft pick. However, he appeared in only 17 games for the Canucks before breaking his ankle, requiring surgery. While recovering, he was traded back to Pittsburgh, and he appeared in 6 more games for the Penguins late in the season. He would leave Pittsburgh for good at the start of the 1990–91 season, when he was selected by the Los Angeles Kings in the NHL Waiver Draft. At the time, he was Pittsburgh's all-time leader in penalty minutes with 959, although that record would later be broken by Troy Loney and is now held by Kevin Stevens.

Buskas spent a year in Los Angeles, recording 3 goals and 11 points along with 182 penalty minutes in 57 games, before being dealt to the Chicago Blackhawks early in the 1991–92 season. Now a sparingly-used depth defender, he finished the year with 4 assists in 47 games between Los Angeles and Chicago. That season's playoffs would prove to be one of the highlights of his career, as Chicago reached the Stanley Cup finals before losing to his former team, the Pittsburgh Penguins.

Buskas saw his NHL career come to a close in 1992–93, as he was assigned to the minors for the first time since 1984 and appeared in only 4 games for the Blackhawks. Released at the end of the season, he spent two more seasons in the IHL with the Las Vegas Thunder before retiring in 1995. Buskas finished his career with totals of 19 goals and 63 assists for 82 points in 556 career NHL games, along with 1294 penalty minutes.

Following his retirement Buskas, who has obtained a pilot's license during his playing career, remained in the Las Vegas area and ran a flight school in Henderson, Nevada. He would also later serve for a time as an assistant coach with the Las Vegas Thunder.

Buskas is currently a captain with Hawaiian Airlines. He currently lives in Las Vegas and has two children: Paulina and Blake.

== Career statistics ==
			Regular season					Playoffs
Season	Team	League	GP	G	A	Pts	PIM	GP	G	A	Pts	PIM
1977–78	Red Deer Rustlers	AJHL	60	5	2	7	36	—	—	—	—	—
1978–79	Red Deer Rustlers	AJHL	37	13	22	35	63	—	—	—	—	—
1978–79	Billings Bighorns	WHL	1	0	0	0	0	—	—	—	—	—
1978–79	Medicine Hat Tigers	WHL	34	1	12	13	60	—	—	—	—	—
1979–80	Medicine Hat Tigers	WHL	72	7	40	47	284	16	1	6	7	31
1980–81	Medicine Hat Tigers	WHL	72	14	46	60	164	5	1	1	2	8
1981–82	Erie Blades	AHL	69	1	18	19	78	—	—	—	—	—
1982–83	Baltimore Skipjacks	AHL	31	2	8	10	45	—	—	—	—	—
1982–83	Pittsburgh Penguins	NHL	41	2	2	4	102	—	—	—	—	—
1982–83	Muskegon Mohawks	IHL	1	0	0	0	9	—	—	—	—	—
1983–84	Baltimore Skipjacks	AHL	33	2	12	14	100	10	1	3	4	22
1983–84	Pittsburgh Penguins	NHL	47	2	4	6	60	—	—	—	—	—
1984–85	Pittsburgh Penguins	NHL	69	2	7	9	191	—	—	—	—	—
1985–86	Pittsburgh Penguins	NHL	72	2	7	9	159	—	—	—	—	—
1986–87	Pittsburgh Penguins	NHL	68	3	15	18	123	—	—	—	—	—
1987–88	Pittsburgh Penguins	NHL	76	4	8	12	206	—	—	—	—	—
1988–89	Pittsburgh Penguins	NHL	52	1	5	6	105	10	0	0	0	23
1989–90	Vancouver Canucks	NHL	17	0	3	3	36	—	—	—	—	—
1989–90	Pittsburgh Penguins	NHL	6	0	0	0	13	—	—	—	—	—
1990–91	Los Angeles Kings	NHL	57	3	8	11	182	2	0	2	2	22
1991–92	Los Angeles Kings	NHL	5	0	0	0	11	—	—	—	—	—
1991–92	Chicago Blackhawks	NHL	42	0	4	4	80	6	0	1	1	0
1992–93	Chicago Blackhawks	NHL	4	0	0	0	26	—	—	—	—	—
1992–93	Indianapolis Ice	IHL	15	0	3	3	40	—	—	—	—	—
1992–93	Salt Lake Golden Eagles	IHL	31	0	2	2	52	—	—	—	—	—
1993–94	Las Vegas Thunder	IHL	69	2	9	11	131	5	0	2	2	2
1994–95	Las Vegas Thunder	IHL	27	2	3	5	53	10	1	0	1	19
AHL totals			113	5	38	43	223	10	1	3	4	22
NHL totals			556	19	63	82	1294	18	0	3	3	45
IHL totals			143	4	17	21	285	15	1	2	3	21

== Transactions ==
- On June 10, 1981 the Pittsburgh Penguins drafted Rod Buskas in the sixth-round (#112 overall) of the 1981 NHL draft.
- On October 24, 1989 the Pittsburgh Penguins traded Rod Buskas to the Vancouver Canucks in exchange for a 1990 sixth-round pick (#107-Ian Moran).
- On January 8, 1990 the Vancouver Canucks traded Rod Buskas, Tony Tanti and Barry Pederson to the Pittsburgh Penguins in exchange for Dan Quinn, Andrew McBain and Dave Capuano.
- On October 1, 1990 the Los Angeles Kings claimed Rod Buskas from the Pittsburgh Penguins in waiver draft.
- On October 28, 1991 the Los Angeles Kings traded Rod Buskas to the Chicago Blackhawks in exchange for Chris Norton and future considerations.
