= Brian Noonan =

American ice hockey player (born 1965)

- Born: May 29, 1965 (age 61) Boston, Massachusetts, U.S.
- Height: 6 ft 1 in (185 cm)
- Weight: 180 lb (82 kg; 12 st 12 lb)
- Position: Right wing
- Shot: Right
- Played for: Chicago Blackhawks; New York Rangers; St. Louis Blues; Vancouver Canucks; Phoenix Coyotes
- NHL draft: 179th overall, 1983; Chicago Blackhawks
- Playing career: 1987–1999

Brian Noonan (born May 29, 1965) is an American former ice hockey right-winger. He played for the Chicago Blackhawks, New York Rangers, Vancouver Canucks, St. Louis Blues and Phoenix Coyotes.

Originally selected in the 1983 NHL entry draft by the Chicago Blackhawks, Noonan played parts of seven seasons in Chicago, although during the middle part of his career with the Blackhawks he mainly saw playing time in the minors with the Indianapolis Ice. Noonan would eventually regain a roster spot with the Blackhawks, especially after Mike Keenan became head coach. His play contributed to the team reaching the Final in 1992.

Noonan would play for Keenan again when he was traded to the New York Rangers at the trading deadline during the 1993–94 NHL season, and his play contributed to the Rangers reaching their first Stanley Cup in 54 years. Despite being credited to Mark Messier, the game-winning goal of game seven of the 1994 Stanley Cup Final was later shown to be scored by Noonan.

After playing two seasons with the Chicago Wolves, Noonan retired from professional play following the 2000–01 season.

Noonan played for head coach Mike Keenan on four occasions; with the Blackhawks, Rangers, Blues, and Canucks.

Noonan currently coaches hockey in Illinois. He is married and has two daughters.

== Career statistics ==
			Regular season					Playoffs
Season	Team	League	GP	G	A	Pts	PIM	GP	G	A	Pts	PIM
1982–83	Archbishop Williams High School	HS-MA	21	26	17	43		—	—	—	—	—
1983–84	Archbishop Williams High School	HS-MA	17	14	23	37		—	—	—	—	—
1984–85	New Westminster Bruins	WHL	72	50	66	116	76	11	8	7	15	4
1985–86	Saginaw Generals	IHL	76	39	39	78	69	11	6	3	9	8
1985–86	Nova Scotia Oilers	AHL	2	0	0	0	0	—	—	—	—	—
1986–87	Nova Scotia Oilers	AHL	70	25	26	51	30	5	3	1	4	4
1987–88	Chicago Blackhawks	NHL	77	10	20	30	44	3	0	0	0	4
1988–89	Chicago Blackhawks	NHL	45	4	12	16	28	1	0	0	0	0
1988–89	Saginaw Hawks	IHL	19	18	13	31	36	1	0	0	0	0
1989–90	Chicago Blackhawks	NHL	8	0	2	2	6	—	—	—	—	—
1989–90	Indianapolis Ice	IHL	56	40	36	76	85	14	6	9	15	20
1990–91	Chicago Blackhawks	NHL	7	0	4	4	2	—	—	—	—	—
1990–91	Indianapolis Ice	IHL	59	38	53	91	67	7	6	4	10	18
1991–92	Chicago Blackhawks	NHL	65	19	12	31	81	18	6	9	15	30
1992–93	Chicago Blackhawks	NHL	63	16	14	30	81	4	3	0	3	4
1993–94	Chicago Blackhawks	NHL	64	14	21	35	57	—	—	—	—	—
1993–94	New York Rangers	NHL	12	4	2	6	12	22	4	7	11	17
1994–95	New York Rangers	NHL	45	14	13	27	26	5	0	0	0	8
1995–96	St. Louis Blues	NHL	81	13	22	35	84	13	4	1	5	10
1996–97	St. Louis Blues	NHL	13	2	5	7	0	—	—	—	—	—
1996–97	New York Rangers	NHL	44	6	9	15	28	—	—	—	—	—
1996–97	Vancouver Canucks	NHL	16	4	8	12	6	—	—	—	—	—
1997–98	Vancouver Canucks	NHL	82	10	15	25	62	—	—	—	—	—
1998–99	Indianapolis Ice	IHL	65	19	44	63	128	—	—	—	—	—
1998–99	Phoenix Coyotes	NHL	7	0	0	0	0	5	0	2	2	4
1999–2000	Chicago Wolves	IHL	80	30	32	62	80	16	4	7	11	10
2000–01	Chicago Wolves	IHL	82	21	32	53	103	16	1	6	7	38
IHL totals			437	205	249	454	568	65	23	29	52	94
NHL totals			629	116	159	275	517	71	17	19	36	77

== Transactions ==
- March 21, 1994- Traded by the Chicago Blackhawks, along with Stéphane Matteau, to the New York Rangers in exchange for Tony Amonte and Matt Oates.
- July 24, 1995- Signed as a free agent with the St. Louis Blues.
- November 13, 1996- Traded by the St. Louis Blues to the New York Rangers in exchange for Sergio Momesso.
- March 8, 1997- Traded by the New York Rangers, along with Sergei Nemchinov, to the Vancouver Canucks in exchange for Esa Tikkanen and Russ Courtnall.
- March 17, 1999- Signed as a free agent with the Phoenix Coyotes.
