= Mike Needham =

Canadian ice hockey player

- Born: April 4, 1970 (age 55) Calgary, Alberta, Canada
- Height: 5 ft 10 in (178 cm)
- Weight: 185 lb (84 kg; 13 st 3 lb)
- Position: Right wing
- Shot: Right
- Played for: Pittsburgh Penguins; Dallas Stars
- NHL draft: 126th overall, 1989; Pittsburgh Penguins
- Playing career: 1990–1996

Michael Lawrence Needham (born April 4, 1970) is a Canadian former professional ice hockey player. He played 86 games in the National Hockey League with the Pittsburgh Penguins and Dallas Stars between 1992 and 1994. Needham was born in Calgary, Alberta, but grew up in Fort Saskatchewan, Alberta.

== Playing career ==
He played in parts of two NHL seasons with the Pittsburgh Penguins and Dallas Stars from 1992 to 1994. He also appeared in five games during the 1992 Stanley Cup Playoffs, for which he earned a Stanley Cup ring as a member of the Penguins.

== Coaching career ==
In 2014, Needham was named the new assistant coach of the Kamloops Blazers in the WHL. He stayed with the organization until 2018, when the Blazers chose not to renew his contract.

== Career statistics ==
=== Regular season and playoffs ===
			Regular season					Playoffs
Season	Team	League	GP	G	A	Pts	PIM	GP	G	A	Pts	PIM
1985–86	Fort Saskatchewan Traders	AJHL	49	19	26	45	97	—	—	—	—	—
1986–87	Fort Saskatchewan Traders	AJHL	53	30	28	58	127	—	—	—	—	—
1986–87	Kamloops Blazers	WHL	3	1	2	3	0	11	2	1	3	5
1987–88	Kamloops Blazers	WHL	64	31	33	64	93	5	0	1	1	5
1988–89	Kamloops Blazers	WHL	49	24	27	51	55	16	2	9	11	13
1989–90	Kamloops Blazers	WHL	60	59	66	125	75	17	11	13	24	10
1989–90	Kamloops Blazers	M-Cup	—	—	—	—	—	3	1	2	3	2
1990–91	Muskegon Lumberjacks	IHL	65	14	32	46	17	5	2	2	4	5
1991–92	Muskegon Lumberjacks	IHL	80	41	37	78	83	8	4	4	8	6
1991–92	Pittsburgh Penguins	NHL	—	—	—	—	—	5	1	0	1	2
1992–93	Pittsburgh Penguins	NHL	56	8	5	13	14	9	1	0	1	2
1992–93	Cleveland Lumberjacks	IHL	1	2	0	2	0	—	—	—	—	—
1993–94	Pittsburgh Penguins	NHL	25	1	0	1	2	—	—	—	—	—
1993–94	Dallas Stars	NHL	5	0	0	0	0	—	—	—	—	—
1993–94	Cleveland Lumberjacks	IHL	6	4	3	7	7	—	—	—	—	—
1994–95	Kalamazoo Wings	IHL	37	9	9	18	31	14	5	5	10	11
1995–96	Adirondack Red Wings	AHL	16	5	10	15	12	—	—	—	—	—
IHL totals			189	70	80	150	138	27	11	11	22	22
NHL totals			86	9	5	14	16	14	2	0	2	4

=== International ===
Year	Team	Event	GP	G	A	Pts	PIM
1990	Canada	WJC	7	3	4	7	2
Junior totals			7	3	4	7	2

== Awards and achievements ==
- 1990 - WHL West First All-Star Team
- 1990 – Played in Memorial Cup (Kamloops)
- 1990 World Junior Ice Hockey Championships gold medal (Canada)
- 1992 Stanley Cup Championship (Pittsburgh)

== Transactions ==
- March 21, 1994 – Traded to the Dallas Stars by Pittsburgh for Jim McKenzie.
