= Jocelyn Lemieux =

Canadian ice hockey player (born 1967)

- Born: November 18, 1967 (age 58) Mont-Laurier, Quebec, Canada
- Height: 5 ft 11 in (180 cm)
- Weight: 220 lb (100 kg; 15 st 10 lb)
- Position: Right wing
- Shot: Left
- Played for: St. Louis Blues; Montreal Canadiens; Chicago Blackhawks; Hartford Whalers; New Jersey Devils; Calgary Flames; Phoenix Coyotes
- NHL draft: 10th overall, 1986; St. Louis Blues
- Playing career: 1986–1999

Jocelyn Jean-Marc Lemieux (born November 18, 1967) is a Canadian former professional ice hockey player and television analyst. A right winger, he played 597 regular-season games in the National Hockey League (NHL) over 13 seasons between 1986 and 1998, appearing for the St. Louis Blues, Montreal Canadiens, Chicago Blackhawks, Hartford Whalers, New Jersey Devils, Calgary Flames and Phoenix Coyotes. He concluded his professional playing career with the Long Beach Ice Dogs of the International Hockey League (IHL).

Selected tenth overall by the St. Louis Blues in the 1986 NHL Entry Draft, Lemieux made his NHL debut during the 1986–87 season. Over the course of his career, he recorded 80 goals and 84 assists for 164 points in the regular season, while adding 15 points (five goals and 10 assists) in 60 Stanley Cup playoff games. He was a member of the Chicago Blackhawks team that reached the 1992 Stanley Cup Final and recorded two regular-season hat tricks during his NHL career.

Lemieux is the younger brother of four-time Stanley Cup champion Claude Lemieux. Following his retirement from professional hockey, he became a television analyst for Le Hockey des Sénateurs on RDS until 2026.

== Awards and accomplishments ==
- 1985-86, QMJHL First All-Star Team

== Career statistics ==
			Regular season					Playoffs
Season	Team	League	GP	G	A	Pts	PIM	GP	G	A	Pts	PIM
1983–84	Montreal-Concordia	QMAAA	40	15	36	51	104	14	4	11	15	34
1984–85	Laval Voisins	QMJHL	68	13	19	32	88	—	—	—	—	—
1985–86	Laval Titan	QMJHL	71	57	68	125	131	14	9	15	24	37
1986–87	St. Louis Blues	NHL	53	10	8	18	94	5	0	1	1	6
1987–88	St. Louis Blues	NHL	23	1	0	1	42	5	0	0	0	15
1987–88	Peoria Rivermen	IHL	8	0	5	5	35	—	—	—	—	—
1988–89	Montreal Canadiens	NHL	1	0	1	1	0	—	—	—	—	—
1988–89	Sherbrooke Canadiens	AHL	73	25	28	53	134	4	3	1	4	6
1989–90	Montreal Canadiens	NHL	34	4	2	6	61	—	—	—	—	—
1989–90	Chicago Blackhawks	NHL	39	10	11	21	47	18	1	8	9	28
1990–91	Chicago Blackhawks	NHL	67	6	7	13	119	4	0	0	0	0
1991–92	Chicago Blackhawks	NHL	78	6	10	16	80	18	3	1	4	33
1992–93	Chicago Blackhawks	NHL	80	10	21	31	111	4	1	0	1	2
1993–94	Chicago Blackhawks	NHL	66	12	8	20	63	—	—	—	—	—
1993–94	Hartford Whalers	NHL	16	6	1	7	19	—	—	—	—	—
1994–95	Hartford Whalers	NHL	41	6	5	11	32	—	—	—	—	—
1995–96	Hartford Whalers	NHL	29	1	2	3	31	—	—	—	—	—
1995–96	New Jersey Devils	NHL	18	0	1	1	4	—	—	—	—	—
1995–96	Calgary Flames	NHL	20	4	4	8	10	4	0	0	0	0
1996–97	Phoenix Coyotes	NHL	2	1	0	1	0	2	0	0	0	4
1996–97	Long Beach Ice Dogs	IHL	28	4	10	14	54	—	—	—	—	—
1997–98	Phoenix Coyotes	NHL	30	3	3	6	27	—	—	—	—	—
1997–98	Long Beach Ice Dogs	IHL	10	3	5	8	24	—	—	—	—	—
1997–98	Springfield Falcons	AHL	6	3	1	4	0	4	2	2	4	2
1998–99	Long Beach Ice Dogs	IHL	17	4	4	8	16	8	0	2	2	15
NHL totals			597	80	84	164	740	60	5	10	15	88

== Personal ==
Jocelyn is the brother of four-time Stanley Cup champion Claude Lemieux, who played twenty seasons in the National Hockey League and the uncle of Brendan Lemieux. Despite his surname, he is not related to hockey great Mario Lemieux.

Awards and achievements
Preceded by Marty Ruff	St. Louis Blues first-round draft pick 1986	Succeeded by Keith Osborne
