= Dave Michayluk =

Canadian ice hockey player (born 1962)

- Born: May 18, 1962 (age 64) Wakaw, Saskatchewan, Canada
- Height: 5 ft 11 in (180 cm)
- Weight: 185 lb (84 kg; 13 st 3 lb)
- Position: Right wing
- Shot: Left
- Played for: Philadelphia Flyers; Pittsburgh Penguins
- NHL draft: 65th overall, 1981; Philadelphia Flyers
- Playing career: 1982–1997

David Michayluk (born May 18, 1962) is a Canadian former professional ice hockey right winger. He was selected in the fourth round, 64th overall, by the Philadelphia Flyers in the 1981 NHL entry draft. Michayluk also played for the Pittsburgh Penguins.

== Early life ==
Michayluk was born in Wakaw, Saskatchewan. He played junior hockey with the Prince Albert Raiders and Regina Pats.

== Career ==
Michayluk played 21 regular season games in the National Hockey League (NHL) with the Philadelphia Flyers during the 1981–82 and 1982–83 seasons and seven playoff games with the Pittsburgh Penguins during the 1992 Stanley Cup playoffs, winning the Stanley Cup. The rest of his career, which lasted from 1981 to 1997, was spent in the minor leagues.

== Career statistics ==
=== Regular season and playoffs ===
			Regular season					Playoffs
Season	Team	League	GP	G	A	Pts	PIM	GP	G	A	Pts	PIM
1979–80	Prince Albert Raiders	SJHL	60	46	67	113	49	—	—	—	—	—
1979–80	Regina Pats	WHL	1	0	1	1	0	—	—	—	—	—
1980–81	Regina Pats	WHL	72	62	71	133	39	11	5	12	17	8
1981–82	Philadelphia Flyers	NHL	1	0	0	0	0	—	—	—	—	—
1981–82	Regina Pats	WHL	72	62	111	173	128	20	16	24	40	23
1982–83	Maine Mariners	AHL	69	32	40	72	16	8	0	2	2	0
1982–83	Philadelphia Flyers	NHL	13	2	6	8	8	—	—	—	—	—
1983–84	Springfield Indians	AHL	79	18	44	62	37	4	0	0	0	2
1984–85	Hershey Bears	AHL	3	0	2	2	2	—	—	—	—	—
1984–85	Kalamazoo Wings	IHL	82	66	33	99	49	11	7	7	14	0
1985–86	Muskegon Lumberjacks	IHL	77	52	52	104	73	14	6	9	15	12
1985–86	Nova Scotia Oilers	AHL	3	0	1	1	0	—	—	—	—	—
1986–87	Muskegon Lumberjacks	IHL	82	47	53	100	69	15	2	14	16	8
1987–88	Muskegon Lumberjacks	IHL	81	56	81	137	46	6	2	0	2	18
1988–89	Muskegon Lumberjacks	IHL	80	50	72	122	84	13	9	12	21	24
1989–90	Muskegon Lumberjacks	IHL	79	51	51	102	80	15	8	14	22	10
1990–91	Muskegon Lumberjacks	IHL	83	40	62	102	116	5	2	2	4	4
1991–92	Muskegon Lumberjacks	IHL	82	39	63	102	154	13	9	8	17	4
1991–92	Pittsburgh Penguins	NHL	—	—	—	—	—	7	1	1	2	0
1992–93	Cleveland Lumberjacks	IHL	82	47	65	112	104	4	1	2	3	4
1993–94	Cleveland Lumberjacks	IHL	81	48	51	99	92	—	—	—	—	—
1994–95	Cleveland Lumberjacks	IHL	60	19	17	36	22	1	0	0	0	0
1995–96	Cleveland Lumberjacks	IHL	53	22	21	43	27	3	1	0	1	4
1996–97	Cleveland Lumberjacks	IHL	46	10	15	25	18	—	—	—	—	—
NHL totals			14	2	6	8	8	7	1	1	2	0

== Awards ==
- WHL Rookie of the Year (1981)
- WHL Second All-Star Team (1981 & 1982)
- IHL Second All-Star Team (1985, 1992, 1993)
- IHL First All-Star Team (1987, 1988, 1989, 1990)
- Leo P. Lamoureux Memorial Trophy (Leading Scorer - IHL) (1989)
- James Gatschene Memorial Trophy (MVP - IHL) (1989)
- Norman R. "Bud" Poile Trophy (Playoff MVP - IHL) (1989)
- 1992 Stanley Cup Championship (Pittsburgh)
- Ironman Award (Played every game - IHL) (1992, 1993)
- #27 retired by the Cleveland Monsters
