= Jeff Daniels (ice hockey) =

Canadian ice hockey player (born 1968)

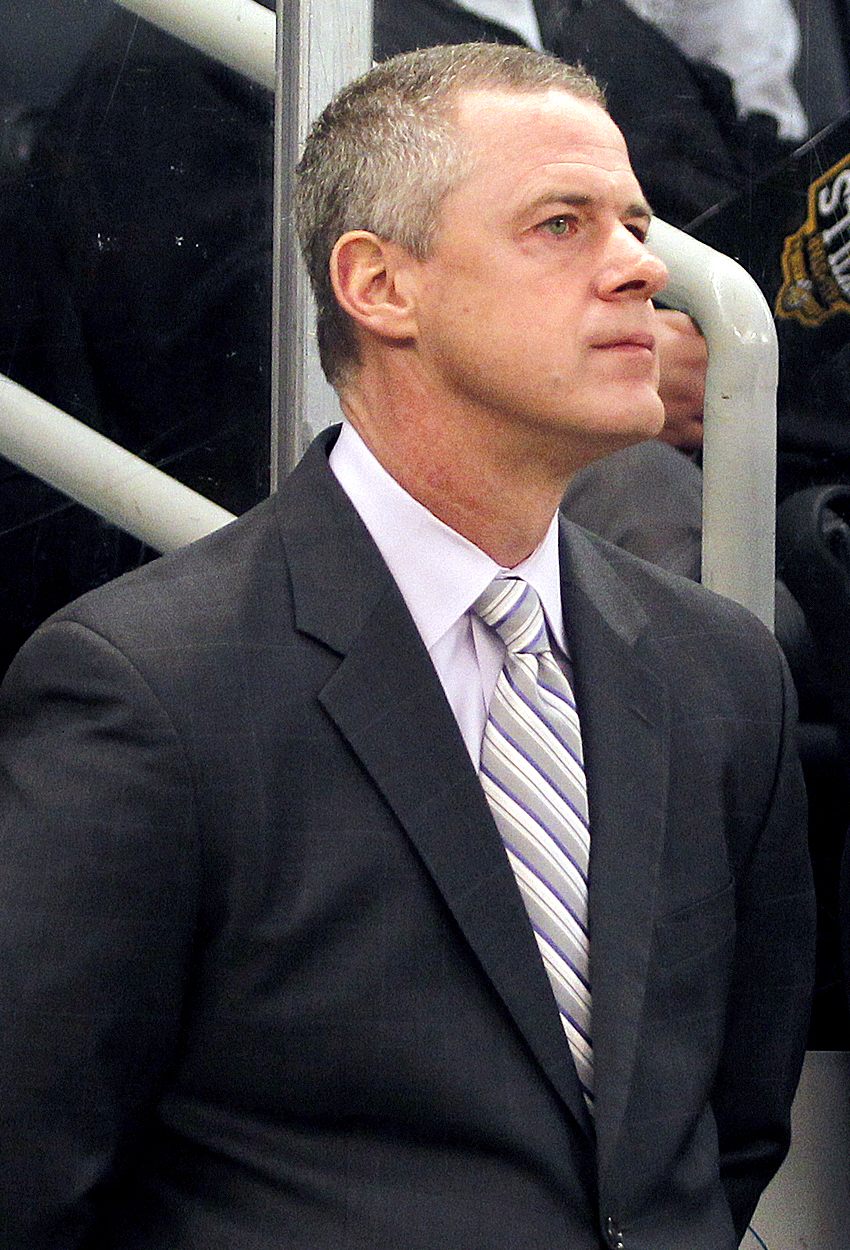
- Daniels in 2013
- Born: June 24, 1968 (age 58) Oshawa, Ontario, Canada
- Height: 6 ft 1 in (185 cm)
- Weight: 200 lb (91 kg; 14 st 4 lb)
- Position: Left wing
- Shot: Left
- Played for: Pittsburgh Penguins; Florida Panthers; Hartford Whalers; Carolina Hurricanes; Nashville Predators
- NHL draft: 109th overall, 1986; Pittsburgh Penguins
- Playing career: 1988–2003

Jeffrey Dwayne Daniels (born June 24, 1968) is a Canadian former professional ice hockey player and current assistant coach to the Carolina Hurricanes.

Prior to his current role, Daniels was an assistant coach for the Hurricanes from 2003–2008 and head coach and general manager of the Hurricanes’ American Hockey League affiliate teams from 2008–2015. He was also a member and subsequently manager of the Hurricanes pro scouting staff from 2015–2018.

Daniels played for two Stanley Cup-winning teams as a player for the Pittsburgh Penguins and has won two Cups as an assistant coach for the Hurricanes.

== Playing career ==
As a youth, he played in the 1981 Quebec International Pee-Wee Hockey Tournament with a minor ice hockey team from Oshawa. He later played junior ice hockey with his hometown Oshawa Generals.

Daniels was selected by the Pittsburgh Penguins in the sixth round, 109th overall in the 1986 NHL entry draft. He played for two Stanley Cup-winning teams with the Pittsburgh Penguins in 1991 and 1992. Daniels' name was engraved on the Cup in 1992 even though he only played two regular season games and thus did not automatically qualify to be on the Stanley Cup. In his 15-year professional playing career as a forward, Daniels spent time with the Pittsburgh, Florida, Nashville and Carolina organizations. He played in 425 NHL regular-season and 41 NHL playoff games, including a third trip to the Stanley Cup Final in 2002 with the Hurricanes. Daniels retired as a player on November 17, 2003.

== Coaching career ==
After briefly serving in a player development role after his retirement, in December 2003 Daniels was hired as an assistant coach on new Hurricanes head coach Peter Laviolette’s coaching staff following the firing of previous Hurricanes head coach Paul Maurice. Daniels spent the next three and a half seasons with the Hurricanes as an assistant coach, helping guide the Hurricanes to the 2006 Stanley Cup championship.

On June 9, 2008, Daniels was named the head coach and general manager for the Albany River Rats. In 2010–11, after the River Rats franchise was relocated and renamed during the prior offseason, Daniels led the Charlotte Checkers to 44 wins and 94 points during the regular-season, the best totals for a Carolina affiliate since 2004–05. Daniels then guided the Checkers to the AHL Eastern Conference Final, at the time the deepest Calder Cup playoff run for Carolina’s AHL team since the 1996–97 Springfield Falcons. Daniels coached the Hurricanes' AHL affiliate through 2015, ending with a record of 268-225-51.

After his time coaching the Checkers, he was a member and subsequently manager of the Hurricanes pro scouting staff. On June 11, 2018, he was named as the final member of new Hurricanes head coach Rod Brind’Amour’s coaching staff. In this role, he again won the Stanley Cup in 2026, earning his second Cup win as a Hurricanes assistant coach.

== Career statistics ==
			Regular season					Playoffs
Season	Team	League	GP	G	A	Pts	PIM	GP	G	A	Pts	PIM
1984–85	Oshawa Generals	OHL	59	7	11	18	16	5	0	0	0	0
1985–86	Oshawa Generals	OHL	62	13	19	32	23	—	—	—	—	—
1986–87	Oshawa Generals	OHL	54	14	9	23	22	15	3	2	5	5
1987–88	Oshawa Generals	OHL	64	29	39	68	59	4	2	3	5	0
1988–89	Muskegon Lumberjacks	IHL	58	21	21	42	58	11	3	5	8	11
1989–90	Muskegon Lumberjacks	IHL	80	30	47	77	39	6	1	1	2	7
1990–91	Muskegon Lumberjacks	IHL	62	23	29	52	18	5	1	3	4	2
1990–91	Pittsburgh Penguins	NHL	11	0	2	2	2	—	—	—	—	—
1991–92	Muskegon Lumberjacks	IHL	44	19	16	35	38	10	5	4	9	9
1991–92	Pittsburgh Penguins	NHL	2	0	0	0	0	—	—	—	—	—
1992–93	Cleveland Lumberjacks	IHL	3	2	1	3	0	—	—	—	—	—
1992–93	Pittsburgh Penguins	NHL	58	5	4	9	14	12	3	2	5	0
1993–94	Pittsburgh Penguins	NHL	63	3	5	8	20	—	—	—	—	—
1993–94	Florida Panthers	NHL	7	0	0	0	0	—	—	—	—	—
1994–95	Detroit Vipers	IHL	25	8	12	20	6	5	1	0	1	0
1994–95	Florida Panthers	NHL	3	0	0	0	0	—	—	—	—	—
1995–96	Springfield Falcons	AHL	72	22	20	42	32	10	3	0	3	2
1996–97	Hartford Whalers	NHL	10	0	2	2	0	—	—	—	—	—
1996–97	Springfield Falcons	AHL	38	18	14	32	19	16	7	3	10	4
1997–98	Carolina Hurricanes	NHL	2	0	0	0	0	—	—	—	—	—
1997–98	Beast of New Haven	AHL	71	24	27	51	34	3	0	1	1	0
1998–99	Nashville Predators	NHL	9	1	3	4	2	—	—	—	—	—
1998–99	Milwaukee Admirals	IHL	62	12	31	43	19	2	1	1	2	0
1999–00	Carolina Hurricanes	NHL	69	3	4	7	10	—	—	—	—	—
2000–01	Carolina Hurricanes	NHL	67	1	1	2	15	6	0	2	2	2
2001–02	Carolina Hurricanes	NHL	65	4	1	5	12	23	0	1	1	0
2002–03	Carolina Hurricanes	NHL	59	0	4	4	8	—	—	—	—	—
NHL totals			425	17	26	43	83	41	3	5	8	2
