= Dirk Graham =

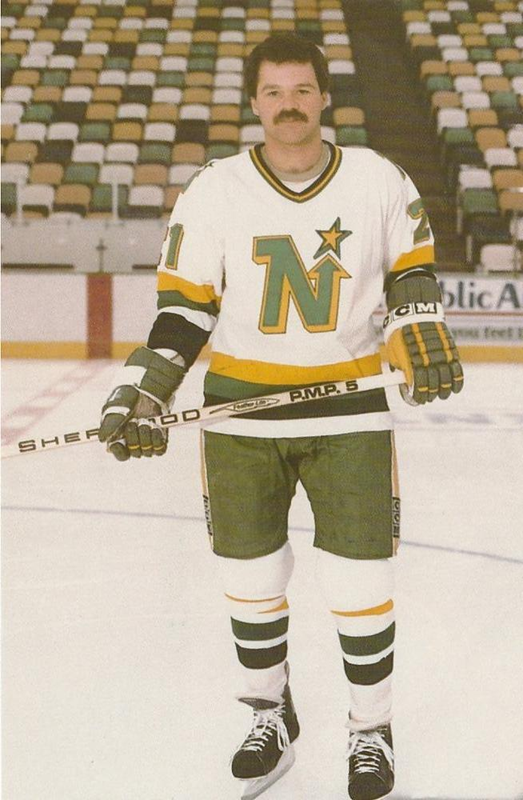
- Born: July 29, 1959 (age 67) Regina, Saskatchewan, Canada
- Height: 5 ft 11 in (180 cm)
- Weight: 190 lb (86 kg; 13 st 8 lb)
- Position: Right wing
- Shot: Right
- Played for: Minnesota North Stars; Chicago Blackhawks
- National team: Canada
- NHL draft: 89th overall, 1979; Vancouver Canucks
- Playing career: 1979–1995

Dirk Milton Graham (born July 29, 1959) is a Canadian former professional ice hockey forward who played for the Chicago Blackhawks and Minnesota North Stars in the National Hockey League (NHL). He was honored in 1991 as the Frank J. Selke Trophy winner for outstanding defensive play by a forward. Graham served as head coach of the Blackhawks for the first 59 games of the 1998–99 season. Graham was both the first NHL captain and head coach of African descent.

== Playing career ==
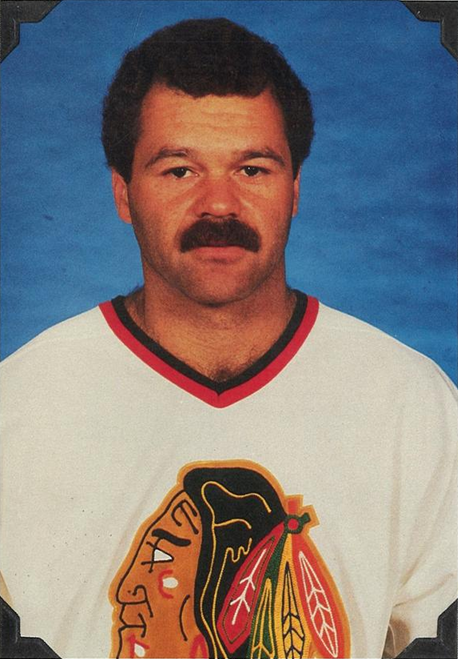
Dirk Graham in 1989 photo for Chicago Blackhawks

Graham was selected 89th overall by the Vancouver Canucks in the 1979 NHL entry draft after spending four years with the Regina Pats in the Western Hockey League. Graham spent four years in the minor leagues, which included the International Hockey League and the Central Hockey League. In 1980–81, Graham scored 40 goals with the Toledo Goaldiggers of the IHL, and he was named to the second all-star team. In 1982–83, he scored 70 goals with the Goaldiggers and was named to the first all-star team. This caught the attention of some, and he was signed as a free agent by the Minnesota North Stars after never playing a game with the Canucks. Graham spent two more years developing in the American Hockey League and Central Hockey League. He was selected to the CHL First All-Star Team in 1983–84. In 1985–86, Graham was playing full-time with the North Stars. He recorded consecutive 20 goal seasons in Minnesota and was chosen to represent Team Canada in the 1987 World Ice Hockey Championships. On January 2, 1988, Graham was traded to the Chicago Blackhawks for Curt Fraser.

Graham played his best hockey in Chicago. In his first full season with the Blackhawks (1988–89), Graham topped the 30 goal mark for the first time in his career and finished with a career high 78 points (A stunning 10 of his 33 goals were short-handed; thus he joins Wayne Gretzky, Mario Lemieux, and Marcel Dionne as one of only four players to achieve ten or more short-handed goals in a season). He scored 20 goals or more four times with the Blackhawks.

In 1990–91, he won the Frank J. Selke Trophy for best defensive forward in the league and represented Team Canada in the Canada Cup tournament. Canada would beat the United States to take first place. Late in 1988–89, Graham was named team captain (replacing Denis Savard), the first player of African descent to become team captain in the National Hockey League. He captained the team all the way to the Stanley Cup Final in 1991–92, where they were swept by the Pittsburgh Penguins. Graham retired in 1995 after the lockout shortened season.

== Post-playing career ==
Shortly after retiring, Graham served as assistant coach for Craig Hartsburg with the Chicago Blackhawks. Graham took a year off, then returned as a scout for the Chicago Blackhawks. He served briefly as a head coach in 1998–99 until he was replaced by Lorne Molleken. He is currently a scout for the San Jose Sharks.

== Awards and achievements ==
Dirk Graham
Medal record

Representing Canada

Ice hockey

Canada Cup
Gold medal – first place	1991 Canada	Ice Hockey

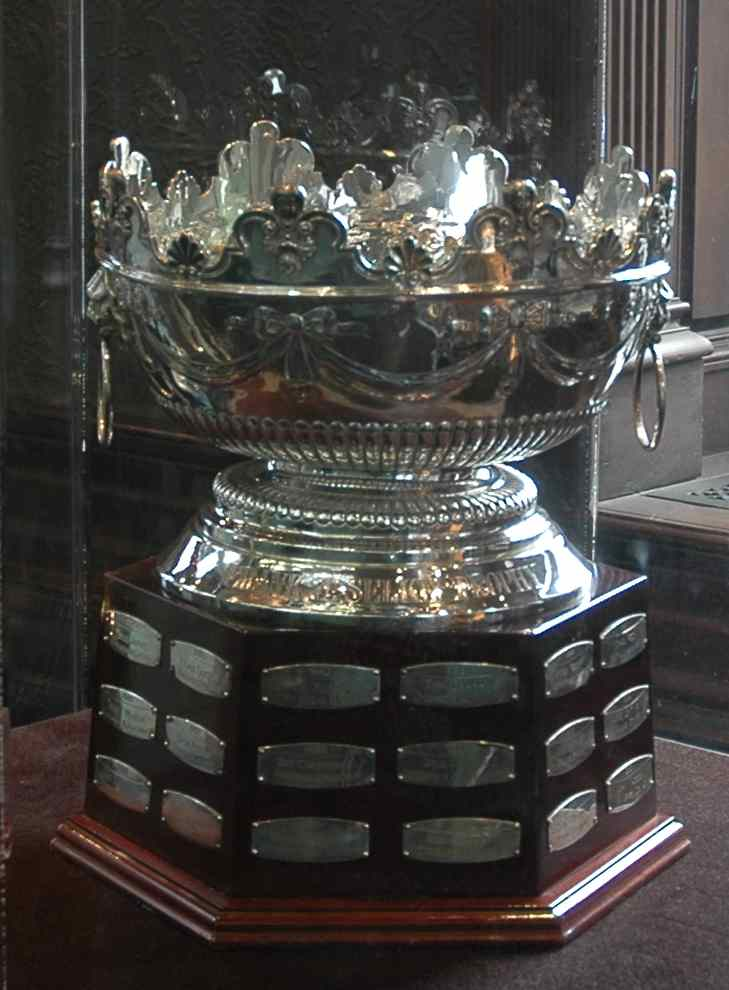
Dirk Graham won the Frank Selke Trophy

- WHL Second All-Star Team – 1979
- Selected to the IHL Second All-Star Team in 1981.
- Selected to the IHL First All-Star Team in 1983.
- Selected to the CHL First All-Star Team in 1984.
- Frank J. Selke Trophy winner in 1991.
- First player of African descent to be named team captain in the NHL.
- First person of African descent to be named head coach in the NHL.

== Career statistics ==
=== Regular season and playoffs ===
			Regular season					Playoffs
Season	Team	League	GP	G	A	Pts	PIM	GP	G	A	Pts	PIM
1975–76	Regina Blues	SJHL	54	36	32	68	82	—	—	—	—	—
1975–76	Regina Pats	WCHL	2	0	0	0	0	6	1	1	2	5
1976–77	Regina Pats	WCHL	65	37	28	65	66	—	—	—	—	—
1977–78	Regina Pats	WCHL	72	49	61	110	87	13	15	19	34	37
1978–79	Regina Pats	WHL	71	48	60	108	252	—	—	—	—	—
1979–80	Dallas Black Hawks	CHL	62	17	15	32	96	—	—	—	—	—
1980–81	Fort Wayne Komets	IHL	6	1	2	3	12	—	—	—	—	—
1980–81	Toledo Goaldiggers	IHL	61	40	45	85	88	—	—	—	—	—
1981–82	Toledo Goaldiggers	IHL	72	49	65	105	68	13	10	11	21	8
1982–83	Toledo Goaldiggers	IHL	78	70	55	125	88	11	13	7	20	30
1983–84	Minnesota North Stars	NHL	6	1	1	2	0	1	0	0	0	2
1983–84	Salt Lake Golden Eagles	CHL	57	37	57	94	72	5	3	8	11	2
1984–85	Minnesota North Stars	NHL	36	12	11	23	23	9	0	4	4	7
1984–85	Springfield Indians	AHL	37	20	28	48	41	—	—	—	—	—
1985–86	Minnesota North Stars	NHL	80	22	33	55	87	5	3	1	4	2
1987–88	Minnesota North Stars	NHL	28	7	5	12	39	—	—	—	—	—
1987–88	Chicago Blackhawks	NHL	42	17	19	36	32	4	1	2	3	4
1988–89	Chicago Blackhawks	NHL	80	33	45	78	91	16	2	4	6	38
1989–90	Chicago Blackhawks	NHL	73	22	32	54	102	5	1	5	6	2
1990–91	Chicago Blackhawks	NHL	80	24	21	45	88	6	1	2	3	19
1991–92	Chicago Blackhawks	NHL	80	17	30	47	89	18	7	5	12	8
1992–93	Chicago Blackhawks	NHL	84	20	17	37	139	4	0	0	0	0
1993–94	Chicago Blackhawks	NHL	67	15	18	33	45	6	0	1	1	4
1994–95	Chicago Blackhawks	NHL	40	4	9	13	42	16	2	3	5	8
NHL totals			772	219	270	489	919	90	17	27	44	94

=== International ===
Year	Team	Event	GP	G	A	Pts	PIM
1987	Canada	WC	9	0	3	3	9
1991	Canada	CC	8	3	1	4	0
Senior totals			17	3	4	7	9

== Coaching record ==
Team	Year	Regular season						Postseason
Team	Year	G	W	L	T	Pts	Division rank	Result
Chicago Blackhawks	1998–99	59	16	35	8	40	3rd in Central	Fired
NHL totals		59	16	35	8	40		

Preceded by Denis Savard	Chicago Blackhawks captain 1989–95	Succeeded by Chris Chelios
Preceded by Rick Meagher	Frank J. Selke Trophy winner 1991	Succeeded by Guy Carbonneau
Preceded by Craig Hartsburg	Head coach of the Chicago Blackhawks; 1998–99	Succeeded by Lorne Molleken
