= Paul Stanton (ice hockey) =

American ice hockey player (born 1967)

- Born: June 22, 1967 (age 59) Boston, Massachusetts, U.S.
- Height: 6 ft 1 in (185 cm)
- Weight: 195 lb (88 kg; 13 st 13 lb)
- Position: Defense
- Shot: Right
- Played for: Pittsburgh Penguins; Boston Bruins; New York Islanders; Adler Mannheim; Nürnberg Ice Tigers; Frankfurt Lions; IF Redhawks Malmö
- National team: United States
- NHL draft: 149th overall, 1985; Pittsburgh Penguins
- Playing career: 1989–2005

Paul Frederick Stanton (born June 22, 1967) is an American former professional ice hockey player.

Graduated from Catholic Memorial High-school, West Roxbury MA. Class of 1985

== Career ==
Drafted by the Pittsburgh Penguins in 1985 as a high school senior, Paul chose to play for the University of Wisconsin–Madison, and was named an NCAA West All-American in 1988.

He played his first NHL game in the 1991 season for the Penguins, and was a member of the Stanley Cup winning team in 1991 and 1992. He was later traded to the Boston Bruins and then to the New York Islanders, playing parts of those seasons with each team's respective minor league teams.

In 1995 and 1996 he played 13 matches for Team USA at the Ice Hockey World Championships, winning the bronze medal.

In 1996 he left the NHL for Europe, playing in the DEL for the Adler Mannheim. With Mannheim he won the German championships in 1997, 1998 and 1999. Prior to the 2000–01 season, he became a member of the Nürnberg Ice Tigers until 2002, when he started for the Frankfurt Lions. He won another German championship as team captain of the heavy underdog Lions in 2004, after Frankfurt had eliminated three higher ranked clubs (Cologne Sharks, Hamburg Freezers and Berlin Polar Bears) in the DEL playoffs.

His most recent team has been IF Redhawks Malmö of the Swedish Elitserien.

Paul Stanton currently resides in Naples, Florida and now serves as an assistant coach for the Florida Gulf Coast University Hockey Team.

== Career statistics ==
			Regular season					Playoffs
Season	Team	League	GP	G	A	Pts	PIM	GP	G	A	Pts	PIM
1985–86	University of Wisconsin	NCAA	36	4	6	10	16	—	—	—	—	—
1986–87	University of Wisconsin	NCAA	41	5	17	22	70	—	—	—	—	—
1987–88	University of Wisconsin	NCAA	45	9	38	47	98	—	—	—	—	—
1988–89	University of Wisconsin	NCAA	45	7	29	36	126	—	—	—	—	—
1989–90	Muskegon Fury	IHL	77	5	27	32	61	15	2	4	6	21
1990–91	Pittsburgh Penguins	NHL	75	5	18	23	40	22	1	2	3	24
1991–92	Pittsburgh Penguins	NHL	54	2	8	10	62	21	1	7	8	42
1992–93	Pittsburgh Penguins	NHL	77	4	12	16	97	1	0	1	1	0
1993–94	Boston Bruins	NHL	71	3	7	10	54	—	—	—	—	—
1994–95	Denver Grizzlies	IHL	11	2	6	8	15	—	—	—	—	—
1994–95	Providence Bruins	AHL	8	4	4	8	4	—	—	—	—	—
1994–95	New York Islanders	NHL	18	0	4	4	9	—	—	—	—	—
1995–96	Adler Mannheim	DEL	47	13	24	37	88	8	2	5	7	8
1996–97	Adler Mannheim	DEL	50	5	26	31	64	9	2	4	6	26
1997–98	Adler Mannheim	DEL	48	11	27	38	72	10	4	6	10	22
1998–99	Adler Mannheim	DEL	38	6	16	22	50	12	2	7	9	22
1999–00	Adler Mannheim	DEL	56	2	19	21	77	4	0	1	1	37
2000–01	Nuremberg Ice Tigers	DEL	49	11	19	30	104	4	1	1	2	26
2001–02	Nuremberg Ice Tigers	DEL	57	7	29	37	94	4	1	1	2	8
2002–03	Frankfurt Lions	DEL	49	10	22	32	167	—	—	—	—	—
2003–04	Frankfurt Lions	DEL	52	8	30	38	104	15	1	9	10	36
2004–05	Malmö Redhawks	SHL	6	0	1	1	27	—	—	—	—	—
NHL totals			295	14	49	63	262	44	2	10	12	66
DEL totals			446	73	212	286	820	72	13	37	50	201

== Awards and honors ==
Award	Year
All-WCHA Second Team	1987–88
AHCA West First-Team All-American	1987–88
WCHA All-Tournament Team	1988
All-WCHA First Team	1988–89
