= Mike Hudson =

Canadian ice hockey player

- Born: February 6, 1967 (age 58) Guelph, Ontario, Canada
- Height: 6 ft 03 in (191 cm)
- Weight: 205 lb (93 kg; 14 st 9 lb)
- Position: Centre
- Shot: Left
- Played for: Chicago Blackhawks; Edmonton Oilers; New York Rangers; Pittsburgh Penguins; Toronto Maple Leafs; St. Louis Blues; Phoenix Coyotes; Augsburger Panther; Adler Mannheim
- NHL draft: 140th overall, 1986; Chicago Blackhawks
- Playing career: 1987–1999

Michael Hudson (born February 6, 1967) is a Canadian former professional ice hockey centre, who played in the National Hockey League between 1988 and 1997.

== Playing career ==
Hudson grew up playing hockey in his hometown of Guelph, Ontario before advancing to Major Junior Hockey with the Hamilton Steelhawks and Sudbury Wolves. Hudson played for seven NHL teams. At the age of 30 Hudson traveled overseas to play in the Deutsche Eishockey Liga for the Adler Mannheim settling there for two years before retiring in 1999. In 416 NHL games Hudson recorded 49 goals and 87 assists for 136 career points. He won a Stanley Cup championship in 1994 with the New York Rangers.

== Career statistics ==
=== Regular season and playoffs ===
			Regular season					Playoffs
Season	Team	League	GP	G	A	Pts	PIM	GP	G	A	Pts	PIM
1984–85	Hamilton Steelhawks	OHL	50	10	12	22	13	8	0	1	1	0
1985–86	Hamilton Steelhawks	OHL	7	3	2	5	4	—	—	—	—	—
1985–86	Sudbury Wolves	OHL	59	35	42	77	20	4	2	5	7	7
1986–87	Sudbury Wolves	OHL	63	40	57	97	18	—	—	—	—	—
1987-88	Saginaw Hawks	IHL	75	18	30	48	44	10	2	3	5	20
1988-89	Saginaw Hawks	IHL	30	15	17	32	10	—	—	—	—	—
1988–89	Chicago Blackhawks	NHL	41	7	16	23	20	10	1	2	3	18
1989–90	Chicago Blackhawks	NHL	49	9	12	21	56	4	0	0	0	2
1990-91	Indianapolis Ice	IHL	3	1	2	3	0	—	—	—	—	—
1990–91	Chicago Blackhawks	NHL	55	7	9	16	62	6	0	2	2	8
1991–92	Chicago Blackhawks	NHL	76	14	15	29	92	16	3	5	8	26
1992–93	Chicago Blackhawks	NHL	36	1	6	7	44	—	—	—	—	—
1992–93	Edmonton Oilers	NHL	5	0	1	1	2	—	—	—	—	—
1993–94	New York Rangers	NHL	48	4	7	11	47	—	—	—	—	—
1994–95	Pittsburgh Penguins	NHL	40	2	9	11	34	11	0	0	0	6
1995–96	Toronto Maple Leafs	NHL	27	2	0	2	29	—	—	—	—	—
1995–96	St. Louis Blues	NHL	32	3	12	15	26	2	0	1	1	4
1996-97	Phoenix Roadrunners	IHL	33	6	9	15	10	—	—	—	—	—
1996–97	Phoenix Coyotes	NHL	7	0	0	0	2	—	—	—	—	—
1997–98	Augsburger Panther	DEL	15	1	5	6	16	—	—	—	—	—
1997–98	Adler Mannheim	DEL	14	4	3	7	2	10	2	5	7	12
1998–99	Adler Mannheim	DEL	45	6	18	24	44	12	0	3	3	14
NHL totals			416	49	87	136	414	49	4	10	14	64
DEL totals			74	11	26	37	62	22	2	8	10	26
