= Troy Loney =

Canadian ice hockey player (born 1963)

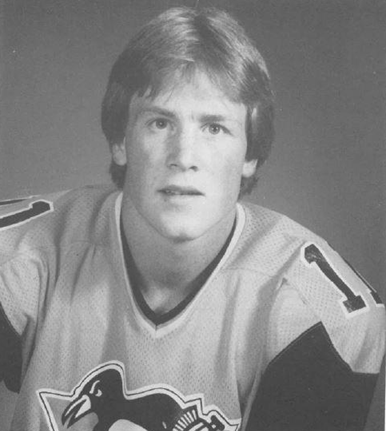
- Loney in 1983 photo
- Born: September 21, 1963 (age 63) Bow Island, Alberta, Canada
- Height: 6 ft 3 in (191 cm)
- Weight: 209 lb (95 kg; 14 st 13 lb)
- Position: Left wing
- Shot: Left
- Played for: Pittsburgh Penguins; Mighty Ducks of Anaheim; New York Rangers; New York Islanders
- NHL draft: 52nd overall, 1982; Pittsburgh Penguins
- Playing career: 1983–1995

Troy Ayne Loney (born September 21, 1963) is a Canadian former professional ice hockey left winger. He was part owner of the Youngstown Phantoms of the USHL before selling it to Black Bear Sports Group Inc. in June 2018.

== Career ==
Loney was born in Bow Island, Alberta. He was a member of the 1991 and 1992 Pittsburgh Penguin Stanley Cup champions. He was claimed by the Mighty Ducks of Anaheim at the Expansion Draft in June 1993 and was named the team's first captain. He retired following the lockout-shortened 1995 season, which he split between the Rangers and Islanders. In 624 NHL games Loney recorded 87 goals, 110 assists, 197 points, and 1091 penalty minutes.

== Career statistics ==
			Regular Season					Playoffs
Season	Team	League	GP	G	A	Pts	PIM	GP	G	A	Pts	PIM
1980–81	Lethbridge Broncos	WHL	71	18	13	31	100	9	2	3	5	14
1981–82	Lethbridge Broncos	WHL	71	26	31	57	152	12	3	3	6	10
1982–83	Lethbridge Broncos	WHL	72	33	34	67	156	20	10	7	17	43
1982–83	Lethbridge Broncos	MC	—	—	—	—	—	3	1	1	2	8
1983–84	Baltimore Skipjacks	AHL	63	18	13	31	147	10	0	2	2	19
1983–84	Pittsburgh Penguins	NHL	13	0	0	0	9	—	—	—	—	—
1984–85	Baltimore Skipjacks	AHL	15	4	2	6	25	—	—	—	—	—
1984–85	Pittsburgh Penguins	NHL	46	10	8	18	59	—	—	—	—	—
1985–86	Baltimore Skipjacks	AHL	33	12	11	23	84	—	—	—	—	—
1985–86	Pittsburgh Penguins	NHL	47	3	9	12	95	—	—	—	—	—
1986–87	Baltimore Skipjacks	AHL	40	13	14	27	134	—	—	—	—	—
1986–87	Pittsburgh Penguins	NHL	23	8	7	15	22	—	—	—	—	—
1987–88	Pittsburgh Penguins	NHL	65	5	13	18	151	—	—	—	—	—
1988–89	Pittsburgh Penguins	NHL	69	10	6	16	165	11	1	3	4	24
1989–90	Pittsburgh Penguins	NHL	67	11	16	27	168	—	—	—	—	—
1990–91	Pittsburgh Penguins	NHL	44	7	9	16	85	24	2	2	4	41
1990–91	Muskegon Lumberjacks	IHL	2	0	0	0	5	—	—	—	—	—
1991–92	Pittsburgh Penguins	NHL	76	10	16	26	127	21	4	5	9	32
1992–93	Pittsburgh Penguins	NHL	82	5	16	21	99	10	1	4	5	0
1993–94	Mighty Ducks of Anaheim	NHL	62	13	6	19	88	—	—	—	—	—
1994–95	New York Islanders	NHL	26	5	4	9	23	—	—	—	—	—
1994–95	New York Rangers	NHL	4	0	0	0	0	1	0	0	0	0
NHL totals			624	87	110	197	1091	67	8	14	22	97

Preceded by Position created	Mighty Ducks of Anaheim captain 1993–94	Succeeded by Randy Ladouceur
