= 1995 Stanley Cup playoffs =

Tournament details
- Dates: May 6–June 24, 1995
- Teams: 16
- Defending champions: New York Rangers

Final positions
- Champions: New Jersey Devils
- Runners-up: Detroit Red Wings

Tournament statistics
- Scoring leader(s): Sergei Fedorov (Red Wings) (24 points)

Awards
- MVP: Claude Lemieux (Devils)

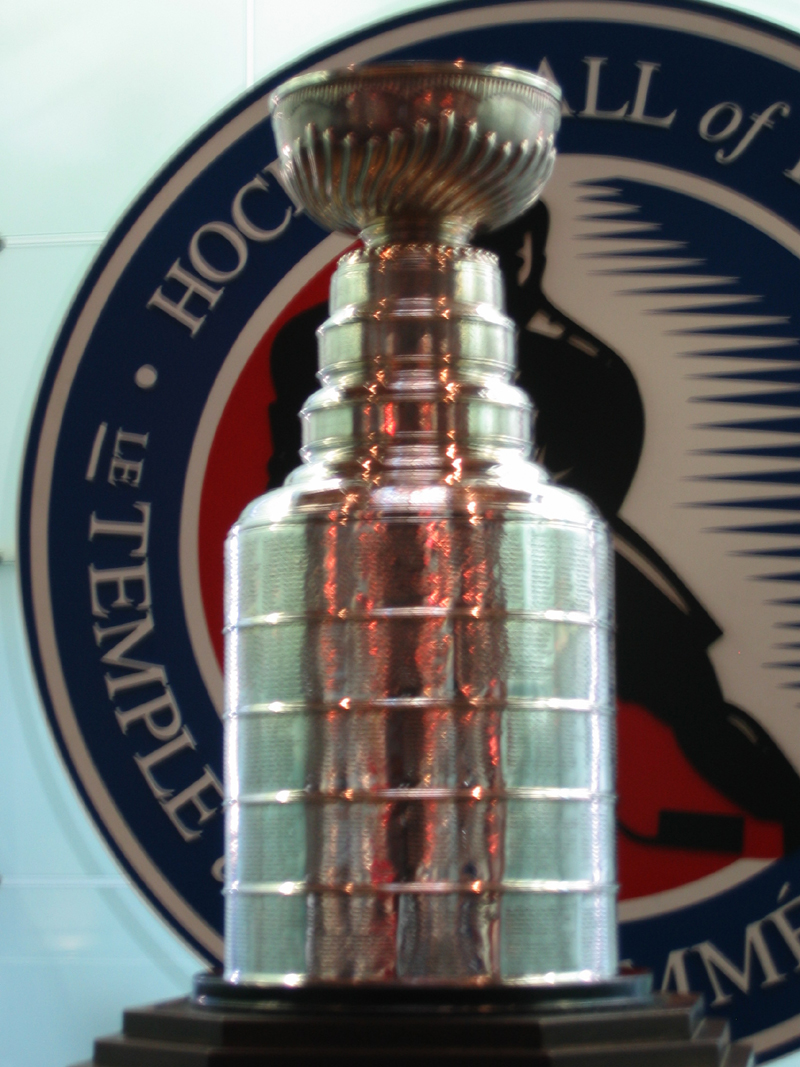
The Stanley Cup, awarded to the champions of the NHL.

The 1995 Stanley Cup playoffs, the playoff tournament of the National Hockey League was played between May 6 and June 24, 1995. The 1994–95 NHL regular season was shortened to 48 games, and the playoffs pushed to a later date, due to a lockout. The sixteen teams that qualified, eight from each conference, played best-of-seven series for the conference quarterfinals, semifinals and championships, and then the conference champions played a best-of-seven series for the Stanley Cup. In the Finals, the New Jersey Devils swept the favored Detroit Red Wings in four games to win their first championship.

This was the only time Patrick Roy missed the playoffs in his career. His team, the Montreal Canadiens, missed the playoffs for the first time since 1970. The Canadiens and the Ottawa Senators missed the playoffs this year. Montreal and Ottawa did not miss the playoffs in the same year again until 2016, when all Canadian teams missed the playoffs. The Quebec Nordiques played their last playoff series during this time. They would move to Denver, Colorado during the summer. For the first time since 1980, no league semifinal/conference final games were played in Canada.

== Playoff seeds ==
The top eight teams in each conference qualified for the playoffs. The top two seeds in each conference were awarded to the division winners; while the six remaining spots were awarded to the highest finishers in their respective conferences.

The following teams qualified for the playoffs:

=== Eastern Conference ===
1. Quebec Nordiques, Northeast Division champions, Eastern Conference regular season champions – 65 points
2. Philadelphia Flyers, Atlantic Division champions – 60 points
3. Pittsburgh Penguins – 61 points
4. Boston Bruins – 57 points
5. New Jersey Devils – 52 points (22 wins, 7 points head-to-head vs. Washington)
6. Washington Capitals – 52 points (22 wins, 1 point head-to-head vs. New Jersey)
7. Buffalo Sabres – 51 points
8. New York Rangers – 47 points

=== Western Conference ===
1. Detroit Red Wings, Central Division champions, Western Conference regular season champions, Presidents' Trophy winners – 70 points
2. Calgary Flames, Pacific Division champions – 55 points
3. St. Louis Blues – 61 points
4. Chicago Blackhawks – 53 points
5. Toronto Maple Leafs – 50 points
6. Vancouver Canucks – 48 points
7. San Jose Sharks – 42 points (19 wins)
8. Dallas Stars – 42 points (17 wins)

== Playoff bracket ==
In each round, teams competed in a best-of-seven series, following a 2–2–1–1–1 format (scores in the bracket indicate the number of games won in each best-of-seven series). The team with home ice advantage played at home for games one and two (and games five and seven, if necessary), and the other team played at home for games three and four (and game six, if necessary). For any series played between Central and Pacific Division teams, the team with home ice advantage had the option of using a 2–3–2 format to reduce travel, with the sites for games five and six switched; if the 2–3–2 format was chosen, the team with home ice advantage then had the additional option to start the series on the road instead of at home. The top eight teams in each conference made the playoffs, with the two division winners seeded 1–2 based on regular season record, and the six remaining teams seeded 3–8.

The NHL used "re-seeding" instead of a fixed bracket playoff system. During the first three rounds, the highest remaining seed in each conference was matched against the lowest remaining seed, the second-highest remaining seed played the second-lowest remaining seed, and so forth. The higher-seeded team was awarded home ice advantage. The two conference winners then advanced to the Stanley Cup Finals, where home ice advantage was awarded to the team that had the better regular season record.

Conference quarterfinals	Conference semifinals
1	Quebec	2
8	NY Rangers	4
2	Philadelphia	4
8	NY Rangers	0
2	Philadelphia	4
7	Buffalo	1
Eastern Conference
3	Pittsburgh	4
6	Washington	3
3	Pittsburgh	1
5	New Jersey	4
4	Boston	1
5	New Jersey	4
1	Detroit	4
8	Dallas	1
1	Detroit	4
7	San Jose	0
2	Calgary	3
7	San Jose	4
Western Conference
3	St. Louis	3
6	Vancouver	4
4	Chicago	4
6	Vancouver	0
4	Chicago	4
5	Toronto	3

Conference finals
2	Philadelphia	2
5	New Jersey	4
1	Detroit	4
4	Chicago	1

Stanley Cup Finals
E5	New Jersey	4
W1	Detroit	0

== Conference quarterfinals ==
=== Eastern Conference quarterfinals ===
==== (1) Quebec Nordiques vs. (8) New York Rangers ====
This was the first playoff meeting between these two teams. This was the final playoff series played by the Quebec Nordiques, as they relocated to Denver, Colorado to become the Colorado Avalanche the next season. The defending Stanley Cup champion Rangers upset the Nordiques in 6 games, becoming the second eighth-seeded team in NHL history to knock off a number one seed.

Game 5 was the final NHL game played at the Quebec Coliseum.

May 6	New York Rangers	4–5	Quebec Nordiques	Colisée de Québec	Recap
Adam Graves (1) – pp – 04:34		First period	17:03 – sh – Scott Young (1); 19:41 – pp – Joe Sakic (1)
Adam Graves (2) – pp – 05:08; Alexander Karpovtsev (1) – 09:27; Alex Kovalev (1) – 18:51		Second period	No scoring
No scoring		Third period	09:44 – Joe Sakic (2); 14:07 – Bob Bassen (1); 19:41 – Joe Sakic (3)
Mike Richter 28 saves / 33 shots		Goalie stats	Stephane Fiset 28 saves / 32 shots

May 8	New York Rangers	8–3	Quebec Nordiques	Colisée de Québec	Recap
Steve Larmer (1) – sh – 12:48		First period	No scoring
Adam Graves (3) – 05:37; Sergei Nemchinov (1) – 06:10; Mark Messier (1) – pp – 12:41		Second period	Bob Bassen (2) – 02:38; Janne Laukkanen (1) - 13:37
Sergei Zubov (1) – 05:35; Petr Nedved (1) – pp – 08:33; Sergei Nemchinov (2) – 11:09; Petr Nedved (2) – 18:31		Third period	16:10 – Valeri Kamensky (1)
Glenn Healy 19 saves / 22 shots		Goalie stats	Stephane Fiset 21 saves / 28 shots Garth Snow 2 saves / 3 shots

May 10	Quebec Nordiques	3–4	New York Rangers	Madison Square Garden	Recap
Scott Young (2) – 01:54		First period	08:50 – Adam Graves (4); 10:58 – Sergei Zubov (2)
Peter Forsberg (1) – 17:14		Second period	14:19 – Sergei Nemchinov (3)
Owen Nolan (1) – 08:00		Third period	12:42 – Brian Leetch (1)
Stephane Fiset 28 saves / 32 shots		Goalie stats	Glenn Healy 17 saves / 20 shots

May 12	Quebec Nordiques	2–3	OT	New York Rangers	Madison Square Garden	Recap
Craig Wolanin (1) – 03:50; Owen Nolan (2) – 09:40		First period		No scoring
No scoring		Second period		04:28 – Brian Leetch (2)
No scoring		Third period		02:03 – Alex Kovalev (2)
No scoring		First overtime period		08:09 – Steve Larmer (2)
Jocelyn Thibault 31 saves / 34 shots		Goalie stats		Glenn Healy 8 saves / 10 shots Mike Richter 21 saves / 21 shots

May 14	New York Rangers	2–4	Quebec Nordiques	Colisée de Québec	Recap
Mark Messier (2) – pp – 06:51; Pat Verbeek (1) – pp – 17:34		First period	04:53 – Mike Ricci (1); 11:09 – Wendel Clark (1); 11:40 – Chris Simon (1)
No scoring		Second period	No scoring
No scoring		Third period	19:27 – en – Scott Young (3)
Mike Richter 25 saves / 28 shots		Goalie stats	Jocelyn Thibault 24 saves / 26 shots

May 16	Quebec Nordiques	2–4	New York Rangers	Madison Square Garden	Recap
No scoring		First period	02:11 – pp – Pat Verbeek (2); 08:26 – Alex Kovalev (3); 19:57 – Sergei Nemchinov (4)
Joe Sakic (4) – sh – 15:56		Second period	10:18 – Alex Kovalev (4)
Peter Forsberg (2) – pp – 05:34		Third period	No scoring
Stephane Fiset 22 saves / 23 shots Jocelyn Thibault 13 saves / 16 shots		Goalie stats	Mike Richter 26 saves / 28 shots

New York won series 4–2

==== (2) Philadelphia Flyers vs. (7) Buffalo Sabres ====
This was the third playoff meeting between these two teams; with Philadelphia winning both previous series. They last met in the 1978 Stanley Cup Quarterfinals, which Philadelphia won in five games. Game four was the last playoff game at Buffalo Memorial Auditorium.

May 7	Buffalo Sabres	3–4	OT	Philadelphia Flyers	CoreStates Spectrum	Recap
Jason Dawe (1) – 01:47		First period		10:18 – Rob DiMaio (1)
Pat LaFontaine (1) – pp – 03:15		Second period		16:51 – Brent Fedyk (1); 18:19 – Kevin Haller (1)
Jason Dawe (2) – 12:33		Third period		No scoring
No scoring		First overtime period		10:06 – Karl Dykhuis (1)
Dominik Hasek 27 saves / 31 shots		Goalie stats		Ron Hextall 26 saves / 29 shots

May 8	Buffalo Sabres	1–3	Philadelphia Flyers	CoreStates Spectrum	Recap
No scoring		First period	03:04 – Rod Brind'Amour (1)
Brian Holzinger (1) – 12:34		Second period	11:43 – sh – Rob DiMaio (2); 18:39 – Anatoli Semenov (1)
No scoring		Third period	No scoring
Dominik Hasek 21 saves / 24 shots		Goalie stats	Ron Hextall 29 saves / 30 shots

May 10	Philadelphia Flyers	1–3	Buffalo Sabres	Buffalo Memorial Auditorium	Recap
Karl Dykhuis (2) – pp – 05:18		First period	12:43 – pp – Donald Audette (1); 14:13 – Wayne Presley (1)
No scoring		Second period	No scoring
No scoring		Third period	19:00 – Alexander Mogilny (1)
Ron Hextall 30 saves / 32 shots		Goalie stats	Dominik Hasek 18 saves / 19 shots

May 12	Philadelphia Flyers	4–2	Buffalo Sabres	Buffalo Memorial Auditorium	Recap
Rod Brind'Amour (2) – 17:51		First period	No scoring
Brent Fedyk (2) – 02:08; Eric Desjardins (1) – pp – 17:14; John LeClair (1) – 18:56		Second period	No scoring
No scoring		Third period	07:18 – Alexander Mogilny (2); 07:55 – Pat LaFontaine (2)
Ron Hextall 25 saves / 27 shots		Goalie stats	Dominik Hasek 23 saves / 27 shots

May 14	Buffalo Sabres	4–6	Philadelphia Flyers	CoreStates Spectrum	Recap
No scoring		First period	04:30 – pp – Rod Brind'Amour (3); 14:19 – Kevin Haller (2); 17:45 – Eric Lindros (1); 18:04 – Patrik Juhlin (1)
Wayne Presley (2) – 12:59; Wayne Presley (3) – sh – 19:51		Second period	04:56 – John LeClair (2)
Alexander Mogilny (3) – 13:00; Brian Holzinger (2) – pp – 19:53		Third period	15:40 – Kevin Dineen (1)
Dominik Hasek 24 saves / 30 shots		Goalie stats	Ron Hextall 24 saves / 28 shots

Philadelphia won series 4–1

==== (3) Pittsburgh Penguins vs. (6) Washington Capitals ====
This was the second consecutive and fourth overall playoff meeting between these two teams; with Pittsburgh winning two of the three previous series. Washington won last year's playoff meeting in six games.

With their win in game seven, the Pens became the first team to have two 3–1 comebacks in a playoff series against the same team.

May 6	Washington Capitals	5–4	Pittsburgh Penguins	Pittsburgh Civic Arena	Recap
Dale Hunter (1) – 10:25		First period	01:37 – pp – Len Barrie (1)
Sergei Gonchar (1) – 03:57; Steve Konowalchuk (1) – sh – 10:59		Second period	00:41 – pp – Kevin Stevens (1); 01:38 – pp – Tomas Sandstrom (1)
Dale Hunter (2) – 00:29; Sergei Gonchar (2) – 02:17		Third period	14:42 – Jaromir Jagr (1)
Olaf Kolzig 15 saves / 16 shots Jim Carey 8 saves / 11 shots		Goalie stats	Ken Wregget 29 saves / 34 shots

May 8	Washington Capitals	3–5	Pittsburgh Penguins	Pittsburgh Civic Arena	Recap
Sylvain Cote (1) – 04:12; Peter Bondra (1) – pp – 09:50; Keith Jones (1) – 12:43		First period	03:35 – pp – Larry Murphy (1)
No scoring		Second period	No scoring
No scoring		Third period	01:06 – Luc Robitaille (1); 01:35 – Jaromir Jagr (2); 04:20 – pp – Kevin Stevens (2); 19:19 – en – Luc Robitaille (2)
Jim Carey 28 saves / 32 shots		Goalie stats	Ken Wregget 19 saves / 22 shots

May 10	Pittsburgh Penguins	2–6	Washington Capitals	USAir Arena	Recap
No scoring		First period	03:01 – Calle Johansson (1)
No scoring		Second period	06:58 – Keith Jones (2); 09:59 – pp – Peter Bondra (2); 14:27 – pp – Keith Jones (3)
Ron Francis (1) – pp – 07:20; Luc Robitaille (3) – 08:06		Third period	01:37 – Joe Juneau (1); 13:07 – pp – Calle Johansson (2)
Ken Wregget 14 saves / 18 shots Tom Barrasso 8 saves / 10 shots		Goalie stats	Jim Carey 23 saves / 25 shots

May 12	Pittsburgh Penguins	2–6	Washington Capitals	USAir Arena	Recap
Larry Murphy (2) – 10:58; Jaromir Jagr (3) – 16:39		First period	00:40 – Steve Konowalchuk (2); 12:51 – Michal Pivonka (1)
No scoring		Second period	12:38 – Robert Pearson (1)
No scoring		Third period	01:50 – Dmitri Khristich (1); 06:03 – Joe Juneau (2); 06:38 – Peter Bondra (3)
Tom Barrasso 25 saves / 31 shots		Goalie stats	Jim Carey 20 saves / 22 shots

May 14	Washington Capitals	5–6	OT	Pittsburgh Penguins	Pittsburgh Civic Arena	Recap
Dale Hunter (3) – pp – 11:19; Calle Johansson (3) – 15:36		First period		17:30 – sh – Jaromir Jagr (4)
Dale Hunter (4) – pp – 09:27		Second period		05:57 – pp – Kevin Stevens (3); 15:42 – Ron Francis (2)
Peter Bondra (4) – 07:14; Peter Bondra (5) – 08:49		Third period		08:23 – Jaromir Jagr (5); 11:41 – Kevin Stevens (4)
No scoring		First overtime period		04:30 – Luc Robitaille (4)
Jim Carey 25 saves / 31 shots		Goalie stats		Ken Wregget 23 saves / 28 shots

May 16	Pittsburgh Penguins	7–1	Washington Capitals	USAir Arena	Recap
Luc Robitaille (5) – 00:42; Jaromir Jagr (6) – 03:37; Jaromir Jagr (7) – pp – 09:31; Luc Robitaille (6) – 12:02		First period	No scoring
Troy Murray (1) – 15:27; Tomas Sandstrom (2) – 18:48		Second period	No scoring
Tomas Sandstrom (3) – pp – 00:27		Third period	18:33 – Keith Jones (4)
Ken Wregget 30 saves / 31 shots		Goalie stats	Jim Carey 7 saves / 13 shots Olaf Kolzig 5 saves / 5 shots Byron Dafoe 2 saves / 3 shots

May 18	Washington Capitals	0–3	Pittsburgh Penguins	Pittsburgh Civic Arena	Recap
No scoring		First period	01:37 – Norm MacIver (1); 15:40 – pp – Ron Francis (3)
No scoring		Second period	No scoring
No scoring		Third period	19:56 – en – Troy Murray (2)
Jim Carey 15 saves / 17 shots		Goalie stats	Ken Wregget 33 saves / 33 shots

Pittsburgh won series 4–3

==== (4) Boston Bruins vs. (5) New Jersey Devils ====
This was the second consecutive and third overall playoff meeting between these two teams; with the teams splitting the two previous series. New Jersey won last year's playoff meeting in six games.

Game five was the last game played in the Boston Garden.

May 7	New Jersey Devils	5–0	Boston Bruins	Boston Garden	Recap
Stephane Richer (1) – pp – 06:55; Claude Lemieux (1) – 16:04; Claude Lemieux (2) – 19:12		First period	No Scoring
Tommy Albelin (1) – 14:59		Second period	No Scoring
Randy McKay (1) – pp – 05:01		Third period	No Scoring
Martin Brodeur 23 saves / 23 shots		Goalie stats	Blaine Lacher 13 saves / 17 shots Craig Billington 9 saves / 10 shots

May 8	New Jersey Devils	3–0	Boston Bruins	Boston Garden	Recap
Stephane Richer (2) – sh – 14:10		First period	No Scoring
No Scoring		Second period	No Scoring
Neal Broten (1) – 18:30; Tom Chorske (1) – en – 19:29		Third period	No Scoring
Martin Brodeur 23 saves / 23 shots		Goalie stats	Blaine Lacher 28 saves / 30 shots

May 10	Boston Bruins	3–2	New Jersey Devils	Brendan Byrne Arena	Recap
No Scoring		First period	No Scoring
Mats Naslund (1) – 09:51; Mariusz Czerkawski (1) – 11:56; Cam Neely (1) – pp – 18:50		Second period	04:07 – Jim Dowd (1)
No Scoring		Third period	04:34 – pp – Scott Niedermayer (1)
Blaine Lacher 31 saves / 33 shots		Goalie stats	Martin Brodeur 14 saves / 17 shots

May 12	Boston Bruins	0–1	OT	New Jersey Devils	Brendan Byrne Arena	Recap
No Scoring		First period		No Scoring
No Scoring		Second period		No Scoring
No Scoring		Third period		No Scoring
No Scoring		First overtime period		08:51 – Randy McKay (2)
Blaine Lacher 24 saves / 25 shots		Goalie stats		Martin Brodeur 38 saves / 38 shots

May 14	New Jersey Devils	3–2	Boston Bruins	Boston Garden	Recap
Bill Guerin (1) – pp – 09:00		First period	No Scoring
Shawn Chambers (1) – pp – 13:54		Second period	00:35 – Cam Neely (2)
Valeri Zelepukin (1) – 04:50		Third period	15:19 – pp – Adam Oates (1)
Martin Brodeur 28 saves / 30 shots		Goalie stats	Blaine Lacher 17 saves / 20 shots

New Jersey won series 4–1

=== Western Conference quarterfinals ===
==== (1) Detroit Red Wings vs. (8) Dallas Stars ====
This was the second playoff meeting between these two teams; with Detroit winning the only previous series. They last met in the 1992 Norris Division Semifinals, which Detroit won in seven games against the Minnesota North Stars.

May 7	Dallas Stars	3–4	Detroit Red Wings	Joe Louis Arena	Recap
No scoring		First period	07:05 – pp – Ray Sheppard (1)
Dean Evason (1) – sh – 00:45		Second period	00:57 – pp – Steve Yzerman (1)
Paul Broten (1) – 03:52; Trent Klatt (1) – pp – 07:50		Third period	00:42 – pp – Nicklas Lidstrom (1); 10:15 – Vyacheslav Kozlov (1)
Andy Moog 33 saves / 37 shots		Goalie stats	Mike Vernon 17 saves / 20 shots

May 9	Dallas Stars	1–4	Detroit Red Wings	Joe Louis Arena	Recap
Peter Zezel (1) – 08:10		First period	03:44 – Paul Coffey (1); 04:27 – pp – Nicklas Lidstrom (2); 17:39 – pp – Nicklas Lidstrom (3)
No scoring		Second period	08:33 – Keith Primeau (1)
No scoring		Third period	No scoring
Andy Moog 25 saves / 29 shots		Goalie stats	Mike Vernon 20 saves / 21 shots

May 11	Detroit Red Wings	5–1	Dallas Stars	Reunion Arena	Recap
Dino Ciccarelli (1) – pp – 03:17; Vyacheslav Kozlov (2) – 10:32		First period	13:49 – pp – Dave Gagner (1)
Keith Primeau (2) – pp – 03:08; Dino Ciccarelli (2) – pp – 15:37		Second period	No scoring
Dino Ciccarelli (3) – pp – 10:22		Third period	No scoring
Mike Vernon 23 saves / 24 shots		Goalie stats	Andy Moog 24 saves / 28 shots Darcy Wakaluk 8 saves / 9 shots

May 14	Detroit Red Wings	1–4	Dallas Stars	Reunion Arena	Recap
No scoring		First period	10:52 – Greg Adams (1); 14:00 – pp – Kevin Hatcher (1)
No scoring		Second period	No scoring
Kris Draper (1) – 14:58		Third period	14:39 – Corey Millen (1); 15:19 – Greg Adams (2)
Mike Vernon 20 saves / 24 shots		Goalie stats	Andy Moog 34 saves / 35 shots

May 15	Dallas Stars	1–3	Detroit Red Wings	Joe Louis Arena	Recap
No scoring		First period	17:35 – Darren McCarty (1)
Kevin Hatcher (2) – 02:12		Second period	19:17 – Dino Ciccarelli (4)
No scoring		Third period	06:08 – Vyacheslav Kozlov (3)
Andy Moog 37 saves / 40 shots		Goalie stats	Mike Vernon 24 saves / 25 shots

Detroit won series 4–1

==== (2) Calgary Flames vs. (7) San Jose Sharks ====
This was the first playoff meeting between these two teams. Calgary set an NHL record by scoring 35 goals, the most by any team in a seven-game series. The 35 goals is also the highest number of goals ever scored by a team that lost a series in NHL history. A total of 61 goals were scored in the series, the highest total between both teams in a seven-game series in NHL history.

May 7	San Jose Sharks	5–4	Calgary Flames	Olympic Saddledome	Recap
Sergei Makarov (1) – 04:44; Mike Rathje (1) – pp – 14:46; Ulf Dahlen (1) – 17:15		First period	02:26 – Paul Kruse (1)
Jamie Baker (1) – 02:58; Jamie Baker (2) – 19:42		Second period	18:19 – sh – Theoren Fleury (1)
No scoring		Third period	03:53 – pp – Steve Chiasson (1); 19:54 – German Titov (1)
Arturs Irbe 35 saves / 39 shots		Goalie stats	Trevor Kidd 11 saves / 16 shots Rick Tabaracci 9 saves / 9 shots

May 9	San Jose Sharks	5–4	OT	Calgary Flames	Olympic Saddledome	Recap
Sandis Ozolinsh (1) – pp – 19:29		First period		07:26 – German Titov (2); 13:49 – sh – Sheldon Kennedy (1)
Chris Tancill (1) – 05:09; Pat Falloon (1) – 13:29		Second period		No scoring
Sandis Ozolinsh (2) – 08:42		Third period		05:58 – Kelly Kisio (1); 19:13 – Robert Reichel (1)
Ulf Dahlen (2) – pp – 12:21		First overtime period		No scoring
Arturs Irbe 30 saves / 34 shots		Goalie stats		Trevor Kidd 32 saves / 37 shots

May 11	Calgary Flames	9–2	San Jose Sharks	San Jose Arena	Recap
Paul Kruse (2) – 00:43; Mike Sullivan (1) – 01:20; Mike Sullivan (2) – sh – 05:17; Ronnie Stern (1) – sh – 07:15		First period	05:42 – pp – Ulf Dahlen (3)
Kelly Kisio (2) – pp – 01:28; Joe Nieuwendyk (1) – 03:18		Second period	10:48 – pp – Mike Rathje (2)
Mike Sullivan (3) – 01:02; Joe Nieuwendyk (2) – 02:00; Kelly Kisio (3) – 17:19		Third period	No scoring
Trevor Kidd 22 saves / 24 shots		Goalie stats	Arturs Irbe 1 save / 5 shots Wade Flaherty 21 saves / 26 shots

May 13	Calgary Flames	6–4	San Jose Sharks	San Jose Arena	Recap
Theoren Fleury (2) – pp – 09:08		First period	No scoring
Theoren Fleury (3) – 01:19; Theoren Fleury (4) – 03:25; Ronnie Stern (2) – 18:01		Second period	05:45 – Jeff Friesen (1); 10:35 – pp – Mike Rathje (3)
Robert Reichel (2) – 09:55; Theoren Fleury (5) – en – 19:58		Third period	14:34 – Sergei Makarov (2); 19:51 – en – Ulf Dahlen (4)
Trevor Kidd 25 saves / 29 shots		Goalie stats	Arturs Irbe 30 saves / 35 shots

May 15	San Jose Sharks	0–5	Calgary Flames	Olympic Saddledome	Recap
No scoring		First period	06:07 – pp – Joe Nieuwendyk (3); 10:12 – Theoren Fleury (6); 18:44 – pp – Theoren Fleury (7)
No scoring		Second period	No scoring
No scoring		Third period	08:54 – sh – German Titov (3); 19:51 – pp – Ronnie Stern (3)
Arturs Irbe 21 saves / 25 shots Wade Flaherty 0 saves / 1 shot		Goalie stats	Trevor Kidd 25 saves / 25 shots

May 17	Calgary Flames	3–5	San Jose Sharks	San Jose Arena	Recap
German Titov (4) – 06:44; Sheldon Kennedy (2) – 18:11		First period	03:15 – Sandis Ozolinsh (3)
No scoring		Second period	01:56 – Craig Janney (1); 13:17 – Jeff Odgers (1); 19:23 – Craig Janney (2)
Paul Kruse (3) – sh – 17:45		Third period	08:38 – Ray Whitney (1)
Trevor Kidd 15 saves / 20 shots		Goalie stats	Wade Flaherty 30 saves / 33 shots

May 19	San Jose Sharks	5–4	2OT	Calgary Flames	Olympic Saddledome	Recap
Pat Falloon (2) – 06:50		First period		No scoring
Igor Larionov (1) – 09:30		Second period		19:19 – Paul Kruse (4)
Pat Falloon (3) – 00:19; Craig Janney (3) – 11:33		Third period		04:14 – Sheldon Kennedy (3); 13:22 – pp – Joe Nieuwendyk (4); 14:04 – German Titov (5)
Ray Whitney (2) – 01:54		Second overtime period		No scoring
Wade Flaherty 56 saves / 60 shots		Goalie stats		Trevor Kidd 25 saves / 30 shots

San Jose won series 4–3

==== (3) St. Louis Blues vs. (6) Vancouver Canucks ====
This was first playoff meeting between these two teams.

May 7	Vancouver Canucks	1–2	St. Louis Blues	Kiel Center	Recap
No scoring		First period	18:18 – pp – Brett Hull (1)
Pavel Bure (1) – 10:32		Second period	01:16 – pp – Adam Creighton (1)
No scoring		Third period	No scoring
Kirk McLean 34 saves / 36 shots		Goalie stats	Curtis Joseph 25 saves / 26 shots

May 9	Vancouver Canucks	5–3	St. Louis Blues	Kiel Center	Recap
Sergio Momesso (1) – 19:21		First period	07:42 – pp – Todd Elik (1); 16:57 – Todd Elik (2)
Dave Babych (1) – pp – 02:14; Jyrki Lumme (1) – 15:15		Second period	10:27 – Al MacInnis (1)
Russ Courtnall (1) – 08:11; Pavel Bure (2) – sh – 10:18		Third period	No scoring
Kirk McLean 33 saves / 36 shots		Goalie stats	Curtis Joseph 20 saves / 25 shots Jon Casey 1 save / 1 shot

May 11	St. Louis Blues	1–6	Vancouver Canucks	Pacific Coliseum	Recap
Brett Hull (2) – 00:20		First period	01:18 – pp – Jyrki Lumme (2); 04:30 – pp – Geoff Courtnall (1); 10:53 – sh – Dave Babych (2)
No scoring		Second period	05:16 – Sergio Momesso (2); 18:34 – pp – Sergio Momesso (3)
No scoring		Third period	06:48 – pp – Trevor Linden (1)
Curtis Joseph 30 saves / 36 shots		Goalie stats	Kirk McLean 24 saves / 25 shots

May 13	St. Louis Blues	5–2	Vancouver Canucks	Pacific Coliseum	Recap
Jeff Norton (1) – 07:37		First period	05:53 – pp – Pavel Bure (3)
Brendan Shanahan (1) – 08:26; Brendan Shanahan (2) – 11:17; Brendan Shanahan (3) – pp – 12:42		Second period	04:41 – sh – Russ Courtnall (2)
Glenn Anderson (1) – 13:01		Third period	No scoring
Curtis Joseph 24 saves / 26 shots		Goalie stats	Kirk McLean 32 saves / 37 shots

May 15	Vancouver Canucks	6–5	OT	St. Louis Blues	Kiel Center	Recap
Pavel Bure (4) – 04:55		First period		12:10 – pp – Brett Hull (3)
Christian Ruuttu (1) – sh – 04:31; Geoff Courtnall (2) – sh – 04:48		Second period		10:13 – Todd Elik (3); 16:56 – Bill Houlder (1)
Josef Beranek (1) – 01:37; Cliff Ronning (1) – pp – 05:56		Third period		02:32 – Brendan Shanahan (4); 08:22 – Murray Baron (1)
Cliff Ronning (2) – 01:48		First overtime period		No scoring
Kirk McLean 33 saves / 38 shots		Goalie stats		Curtis Joseph 15 saves / 19 shots Jon Casey 7 saves / 9 shots

May 17	St. Louis Blues	8–2	Vancouver Canucks	Pacific Coliseum	Recap
Brett Hull (4) – 05:56; Brett Hull (5) – 19:51		First period	No scoring
Esa Tikkanen (1) – 08:59; Adam Creighton (2) – 11:54; Basil McRae (1) – 12:35; Todd Elik (4) – sh – 16:53		Second period	11:14 – pp – Geoff Courtnall (3); 17:19 – pp – Pavel Bure (5)
Esa Tikkanen (2) – pp – 08:34; Guy Carbonneau (1) – 11:24		Third period	No scoring
Curtis Joseph 23 saves / 25 shots		Goalie stats	Kirk McLean 11 saves / 17 shots Kay Whitmore 16 saves / 18 shots

May 19	Vancouver Canucks	5–3	St. Louis Blues	Kiel Center	Recap
Adrian Aucoin (1) – pp – 08:35; Pavel Bure (6) – sh – 12:33; Geoff Courtnall (4) – pp – 18:27		First period	13:36 – Basil McRae (2)
Cliff Ronning (3) – 02:05		Second period	07:55 – Denis Chasse (1)
Pavel Bure (7) – en – 19:38		Third period	15:25 – Brett Hull (6)
Kirk McLean 41 saves / 44 shots		Goalie stats	Curtis Joseph 17 saves / 21 shots

Vancouver won series 4–3

==== (4) Chicago Blackhawks vs. (5) Toronto Maple Leafs ====
This was the second consecutive and ninth overall playoff meeting between these two teams; with Toronto winning six of the eight previous series. Toronto won last year's playoff meeting in six games. It was Chicago's first win against Toronto since 1938.

May 7	Toronto Maple Leafs	5–3	Chicago Blackhawks	United Center	Recap
Mats Sundin (1) – pp – 04:05		First period	No scoring
Paul DiPietro (1) – 19:26		Second period	12:33 – Patrick Poulin (1); 14:01 – Tony Amonte (1)
Mike Gartner (1) – 01:25; Mats Sundin (2) – 10:50; Dave Andreychuk (1) – 11:04		Third period	13:28 – Jeff Shantz (1)
Felix Potvin 27 saves / 30 shots		Goalie stats	Ed Belfour 28 saves / 33 shots Jeff Hackett 1 save / 1 shot

May 9	Toronto Maple Leafs	3–0	Chicago Blackhawks	United Center	Recap
No scoring		First period	No scoring
Mike Ridley (1) – 19:53		Second period	No scoring
Mats Sundin (3) – pp – 09:18; Mike Gartner (2) – en – 19:43		Third period	No scoring
Felix Potvin 42 saves / 42 shots		Goalie stats	Ed Belfour 14 saves / 16 shots

May 11	Chicago Blackhawks	3–2	Toronto Maple Leafs	Maple Leaf Gardens	Recap
Gary Suter (1) – pp – 18:43		First period	15:16 – pp – Mike Ridley (2)
Gary Suter (2) – 03:44		Second period	No scoring
Chris Chelios (1) – sh – 13:02		Third period	19:02 – Mats Sundin (4)
Ed Belfour 34 saves / 36 shots		Goalie stats	Felix Potvin 34 saves / 37 shots

May 13	Chicago Blackhawks	3–1	Toronto Maple Leafs	Maple Leaf Gardens	Recap
Joe Murphy (1) – 13:28		First period	No scoring
Murray Craven (1) – 08:22		Second period	No scoring
Jeff Shantz (2) – en – 19:14		Third period	01:57 – Jamie Macoun (1)
Ed Belfour 31 saves / 32 shots		Goalie stats	Felix Potvin 27 saves / 29 shots

May 15	Toronto Maple Leafs	2–4	Chicago Blackhawks	United Center	Recap
No scoring		First period	10:22 – Murray Craven (2)
Mats Sundin (5) – 19:11		Second period	09:53 – Tony Amonte (2)
Dave Andreychuk (2) – pp – 02:52		Third period	05:30 – Joe Murphy (2); 14:41 – Murray Craven (3)
Felix Potvin 29 saves / 33 shots		Goalie stats	Ed Belfour 23 saves / 25 shots

May 17	Chicago Blackhawks	4–5	OT	Toronto Maple Leafs	Maple Leaf Gardens	Recap
Dirk Graham (1) – 17:12		First period		No scoring
No scoring		Second period		05:17 – pp – Dmitri Mironov (1); 12:14 – Tie Domi (1); 14:36 – Mike Ridley (3)
Denis Savard (1) – pp – 02:48; Joe Murphy (3) – 12:49; Brent Sutter (1) – 15:23		Third period		00:55 – pp – Randy Wood (1)
No scoring		First overtime period		10:00 – Randy Wood (2)
Ed Belfour 23 saves / 27 shots Jeff Hackett 9 saves / 10 shots		Goalie stats		Felix Potvin 46 saves / 50 shots

May 19	Toronto Maple Leafs	2–5	Chicago Blackhawks	United Center	Recap
Dave Andreychuk (3) – pp – 17:03		First period	13:41 – Denis Savard (2)
No scoring		Second period	17:51 – Eric Weinrich (1)
Dmitri Mironov (2) – 16:47		Third period	11:53 – Joe Murphy (4); 12:19 – Patrick Poulin (2); 19:50 – en – Joe Murphy (5)
Felix Potvin 28 saves / 32 shots		Goalie stats	Ed Belfour 22 saves / 24 shots

Chicago won series 4–3

== Conference semifinals ==
=== Eastern Conference semifinals ===
==== (2) Philadelphia Flyers vs. (8) New York Rangers ====
This was the ninth playoff meeting between these two teams; with the teams splitting the eight previous series. They last met in the 1987 Patrick Division Semifinals, which Philadelphia won in six games.

May 21	New York Rangers	4–5	OT	Philadelphia Flyers	CoreStates Spectrum	Recap
Brian Leetch (3) – pp – 03:08; Petr Nedved (3) – pp – 19:45		First period		No scoring
Pat Verbeek (3) – pp – 15:17		Second period		02:57 – pp – John LeClair (3); 16:52 – John LeClair (4)
Pat Verbeek (4) – 19:40		Third period		12:50 – John LeClair (5); 15:11 – Eric Desjardins (2)
No scoring		First overtime period		07:03 – Eric Desjardins (3)
Mike Richter 25 saves / 30 shots		Goalie stats		Ron Hextall 22 saves / 26 shots

May 22	New York Rangers	3–4	OT	Philadelphia Flyers	CoreStates Spectrum	Recap
Brian Leetch (4) – pp – 07:35; Brian Leetch (5) – pp – 12:46		First period		No scoring
No scoring		Second period		06:15 – Eric Lindros (2); 16:36 – Dmitry Yushkevich (1)
Brian Leetch (6) – 11:19		Third period		00:25 – Mikael Renberg (1)
No scoring		First overtime period		00:25 – Kevin Haller (3)
Mike Richter 22 saves / 26 shots		Goalie stats		Ron Hextall 24 saves / 27 shots

May 24	Philadelphia Flyers	5–2	New York Rangers	Madison Square Garden	Recap
Kevin Dineen (2) – 02:54; Mikael Renberg (2) – 19:44		First period	No scoring
Kevin Dineen (3) – 03:07; Rod Brind'Amour (4) – pp – 10:23; Kevin Haller (4) – sh – 16:59		Second period	13:00 – Mark Messier (3)
No scoring		Third period	13:00 – pp – Sergei Zubov (3)
Ron Hextall 32 saves / 34 shots		Goalie stats	Mike Richter 19 saves / 23 shots Glenn Healy 10 saves / 11 shots

May 26	Philadelphia Flyers	4–1	New York Rangers	Madison Square Garden	Recap
Karl Dykhuis (3) – 12:37; Karl Dykhuis (4) – pp – 17:08		First period	No scoring
Mikael Renberg (3) – 12:29; Anatoli Semenov (2) – 14:22		Second period	19:21 – Mark Osborne (1)
No scoring		Third period	No scoring
Ron Hextall 31 saves / 32 shots		Goalie stats	Glenn Healy 26 saves / 30 shots

Philadelphia won series 4–0

==== (3) Pittsburgh Penguins vs. (5) New Jersey Devils ====
This was the third playoff meeting between these two teams; with Pittsburgh winning both previous series. They last met in the 1993 Patrick Division Semifinals, which Pittsburgh won in five games.

May 20	New Jersey Devils	2–3	Pittsburgh Penguins	Pittsburgh Civic Arena	Recap
Stephane Richer (3) – 11:39		First period	No scoring
No scoring		Second period	08:12 – Ron Francis (4)
Claude Lemieux (3) – 11:01		Third period	01:16 – pp – Jaromir Jagr (8); 18:44 – Luc Robitaille (7)
Martin Brodeur 20 saves / 23 shots		Goalie stats	Ken Wregget 27 saves / 29 shots

May 22	New Jersey Devils	4–2	Pittsburgh Penguins	Pittsburgh Civic Arena	Recap
John MacLean (1) – pp – 06:53		First period	16:34 – Jaromir Jagr (9)
No scoring		Second period	No scoring
Claude Lemieux (4) – 07:49; Scott Stevens (1) – 19:31; Claude Lemieux (5) – en – 19:59		Third period	18:45 – Jaromir Jagr (10)
Martin Brodeur 26 saves / 28 shots		Goalie stats	Ken Wregget 34 saves / 37 shots

May 24	Pittsburgh Penguins	1–5	New Jersey Devils	Brendan Byrne Arena	Recap
No scoring		First period	No scoring
Ron Francis (5) – 10:40		Second period	00:58 – John MacLean (2); 04:03 – Bobby Holik (1); 17:48 – Randy McKay (3)
No scoring		Third period	16:17 – Claude Lemieux (6); 18:51 – pp – Scott Niedermayer (2)
Ken Wregget 40 saves / 45 shots		Goalie stats	Martin Brodeur 21 saves / 22 shots

May 26	Pittsburgh Penguins	1–2	OT	New Jersey Devils	Brendan Byrne Arena	Recap
No scoring		First period		No scoring
No scoring		Second period		No scoring
Ron Francis (6) – 08:57		Third period		00:40 – Neal Broten (2)
No scoring		First overtime period		18:36 – Neal Broten (3)
Ken Wregget 49 saves / 51 shots		Goalie stats		Martin Brodeur 34 saves / 35 shots

May 28	New Jersey Devils	4–1	Pittsburgh Penguins	Pittsburgh Civic Arena	Recap
Bobby Holik (2) – pp – 16:31		First period	09:10 – Chris Joseph (1)
Claude Lemieux (7) – 15:43		Second period	No scoring
Shawn Chambers (2) – pp – 06:27; Claude Lemieux (8) – en – 19:42		Third period	No scoring
Martin Brodeur 31 saves / 32 shots		Goalie stats	Ken Wregget 18 saves / 21 shots

New Jersey won series 4–1

=== Western Conference semifinals ===
==== (1) Detroit Red Wings vs. (7) San Jose Sharks ====
This was the second consecutive and second overall playoff meeting between these two teams. San Jose won last year's playoff meeting in seven games. The Red Wings got revenge on the Sharks in a sweep, scoring 6 goals in all four games.

May 21	San Jose Sharks	0–6	Detroit Red Wings	Joe Louis Arena	Recap
No scoring		First period	No scoring
No scoring		Second period	09:56 – pp – Dino Ciccarelli (5); 15:33 – pp – Paul Coffey (2)
No scoring		Third period	04:01 – Doug Brown (1); 10:08 – pp – Ray Sheppard (2); 15:07 – Sergei Fedorov (1); 19:00 – Kris Draper (2)
Wade Flaherty 27 saves / 33 shots		Goalie stats	Mike Vernon 15 saves / 15 shots

May 23	San Jose Sharks	2–6	Detroit Red Wings	Joe Louis Arena	Recap
No scoring		First period	01:37 – Paul Coffey (3); 09:38 – pp – Sergei Fedorov (2); 12:07 – Steve Yzerman (2); 14:47 – Dino Ciccarelli (6)
No scoring		Second period	14:01 – pp – Sergei Fedorov (3); 19:45 – sh – Doug Brown (2)
Mike Rathje (4) – pp – 06:01; Ulf Dahlen (5) – pp – 10:19		Third period	No scoring
Arturs Irbe 40 saves / 46 shots		Goalie stats	Mike Vernon 15 saves / 17 shots

May 25	Detroit Red Wings	6–2	San Jose Sharks	San Jose Arena	Recap
Ray Sheppard (3) – 15:08; Vyacheslav Kozlov (4) – 15:51		First period	No scoring
Vyacheslav Kozlov (5) – 15:49		Second period	No scoring
Sergei Fedorov (4) – 00:19; Darren McCarty (2) – 01:38; Dino Ciccarelli (7) – 18:57		Third period	09:03 – Ray Whitney (3); 11:44 – Sergei Makarov (3)
Mike Vernon 10 saves / 12 shots		Goalie stats	Wade Flaherty 30 saves / 36 shots

May 27	Detroit Red Wings	6–2	San Jose Sharks	San Jose Arena	Recap
Paul Coffey (4) – 06:01; Vyacheslav Kozlov (6) – 06:29; Doug Brown (3) – 09:56; Vyacheslav Kozlov (7) – 10:34		First period	No scoring
Bob Errey (1) – pp – 14:39		Second period	01:15 – Ray Whitney (4); 09:16 – pp – Mike Rathje (5)
Darren McCarty (3) – 07:44		Third period	No scoring
Mike Vernon 15 saves / 17 shots		Goalie stats	Wade Flaherty 26 saves / 32 shots

Detroit won series 4–0

==== (4) Chicago Blackhawks vs. (6) Vancouver Canucks ====
This was the second playoff meeting between these two teams; with Vancouver winning the only previous series. They last met in the 1982 Clarence Campbell Conference final, which Vancouver won in five games.

Game four was the last game played in the Pacific Coliseum.

May 21	Vancouver Canucks	1–2	OT	Chicago Blackhawks	United Center	Recap
No scoring		First period		No scoring
Trevor Linden (2) – 19:41		Second period		No scoring
No scoring		Third period		10:02 – Denis Savard (3)
No scoring		First overtime period		09:04 – pp – Joe Murphy (6)
Kirk McLean 28 saves / 30 shots		Goalie stats		Ed Belfour 26 saves / 27 shots

May 23	Vancouver Canucks	0–2	Chicago Blackhawks	United Center	Recap
No scoring		First period	13:56 – Jim Cummins (1)
No scoring		Second period	No scoring
No scoring		Third period	05:48 – Patrick Poulin (3)
Kirk McLean 18 saves / 20 shots		Goalie stats	Ed Belfour 17 saves / 17 shots

May 25	Chicago Blackhawks	3–2	OT	Vancouver Canucks	Pacific Coliseum	Recap
Patrick Poulin (4) – pp – 18:31		First period		18:16 – sh – Russ Courtnall (3)
No scoring		Second period		No scoring
Murray Craven (4) – 19:15		Third period		12:34 – Russ Courtnall (4)
Chris Chelios (2) – 06:22		First overtime period		No scoring
Ed Belfour 32 saves / 34 shots		Goalie stats		Kirk McLean 23 saves / 26 shots

May 27	Chicago Blackhawks	4–3	OT	Vancouver Canucks	Pacific Coliseum	Recap
No scoring		First period		No scoring
Murray Craven (5) – 04:13; Gerald Diduck (1) – 19:12		Second period		04:01 – Jeff Brown (1); 09:11 – pp – Roman Oksiuta (1); 17:29 – Roman Oksiuta (2)
Jeremy Roenick (1) – 10:49		Third period		No scoring
Chris Chelios (3) – 05:35		First overtime period		No scoring
Ed Belfour 22 saves / 25 shots		Goalie stats		Kirk McLean 23 saves / 27 shots

Chicago won series 4–0

== Conference finals ==
=== Eastern Conference final ===
==== (2) Philadelphia Flyers vs. (5) New Jersey Devils ====
This was the second playoff series between these two teams, with Philadelphia winning the only previous meeting in two games. They last met in the 1978 Preliminary Round where Philadelphia swept the Colorado Rockies. This was the third Conference Final appearance for New Jersey and the second consecutive appearance after losing to the New York Rangers in seven games the year before. Philadelphia made their fifth semifinal/conference final appearance since the league began using a 16-team or greater playoff format in 1980 and first since losing to Montreal in six games in 1989.

New Jersey handed Philadelphia their first two playoff home losses of the season winning 4–1 in game one and 5–2 in game two and they outshot the Flyers 28–21 and 24–20 respectively. In game three Philadelphia played with a sense of urgency. Trailing 2–1 the Flyers tied the game on Rod Brind'Amour's goal with 6:03 to go in regulation. They went on to win the game 3–2 on captain Eric Lindros' goal at 4:19 of the first overtime period. Playing with their newfound confidence the Flyers won game four by a score of 4–2 despite being outshot 34–19, Flyers goaltender Ron Hextall made 32 saves. In game five the Devils took a 2–1 lead into the second period which ended up scoreless. The Flyers tied the game on Kevin Dineen's second goal of the game at 3:13 of the third period. The Devils almost regained the lead on Stephane Richer's breakaway shot that hit the crossbar with less than four minutes to go in regulation. Then with less than a minute remaining Devils forward Claude Lemieux picked up the puck on a backcheck in the New Jersey zone and skated up the ice, once over the Flyers' blue line Lemieux fired a slap shot that beat Hextall on his blocker side. The goal silenced the Spectrum crowd and gave New Jersey a 3–2 lead with just 44.2 seconds to play. The Devils hung on to win the game 3–2.

In game six Philadelphia opened the scoring on Jim Montgomery's goal at 4:05 of the first period. The Devils calmly utilized the neutral-zone trap to shut down the Flyers' offense while their forwards took advantage. Stephane Richer tied the game with a power play goal at 10:25 and Brian Rolston put the Devils up 2–1 with a goal at 18:15. The scored remained 2–1 for New Jersey until midway through the second period. After a blocked shot by Devils defenceman Shawn Chambers led to a three on one rush for New Jersey, Randy McKay scored his seventh goal of the postseason. The Devils made it 4–1 at 10:11 of the third period when Bobby Carpenter passed the puck past Flyers defenceman Karl Dykhuis up to Claude Lemieux at center ice who went in on a breakaway and scored his league leading eleventh goal of the playoffs. The Flyers fought back as Mikael Renberg scored on the power play at 16:29 to cut the Devils' lead to 4–2 but New Jersey held on to the lead and went on to win the game and series, advancing to the Stanley Cup Finals for the first time in team history.

June 3	New Jersey Devils	4–1	Philadelphia Flyers	CoreStates Spectrum	Recap
Bill Guerin (2) – 15:06; Scott Niedermayer (3) – 18:34		First period	No scoring
Randy McKay (4) – 15:02		Second period	No scoring
Bill Guerin (3) – 02:04		Third period	18:06 – Craig MacTavish (1)
Martin Brodeur 20 saves / 21 shots		Goalie stats	Ron Hextall 24 saves / 28 shots

June 5	New Jersey Devils	5–2	Philadelphia Flyers	CoreStates Spectrum	Recap
Randy McKay (5) – pp – 12:32; John MacLean (3) – pp – 19:48		First period	07:08 – Eric Lindros (3); 13:54 – pp – Mikael Renberg (4)
Neal Broten (4) – pp – 03:51; Bobby Holik (3) – 04:59; Ken Daneyko (1) – 17:02		Second period	No scoring
No scoring		Third period	No scoring
Martin Brodeur 18 saves / 20 shots		Goalie stats	Ron Hextall 11 saves / 16 shots Dominic Roussel 8 saves / 8 shots

June 7	Philadelphia Flyers	3–2	OT	New Jersey Devils	Brendan Byrne Arena	Recap
Kevin Dineen (4) – 04:34		First period		01:32 – Claude Lemieux (9)
No scoring		Second period		02:53 – Randy McKay (6)
Rod Brind'Amour (5) – 13:57		Third period		No scoring
Eric Lindros (4) – 04:19		First overtime period		No scoring
Ron Hextall 31 saves / 33 shots		Goalie stats		Martin Brodeur 22 saves / 25 shots

June 10	Philadelphia Flyers	4–2	New Jersey Devils	Brendan Byrne Arena	Recap
Shjon Podein (1) – 18:09		First period	14:44 – pp – Brian Rolston (1)
Mikael Renberg (5) – 17:50		Second period	No scoring
Rod Brind'Amour (6) – sh – 04:53; Eric Desjardins (4) – 11:47		Third period	13:31 – Mike Peluso (1)
Ron Hextall 32 saves / 34 shots		Goalie stats	Martin Brodeur 13 saves / 17 shots Chris Terreri 2 saves / 2 shots

June 11	New Jersey Devils	3–2	Philadelphia Flyers	CoreStates Spectrum	Recap
John MacLean (4) – 03:42; Bobby Carpenter (1) – pp – 17:17		First period	07:28 – pp – Kevin Dineen (5)
No scoring		Second period	No scoring
Claude Lemieux (10) – 19:15		Third period	03:13 – Kevin Dineen (6)
Martin Brodeur 16 saves / 18 shots		Goalie stats	Ron Hextall 29 saves / 32 shots

June 13	Philadelphia Flyers	2–4	New Jersey Devils	Brendan Byrne Arena	Recap
Jim Montgomery (1) – 04:05		First period	10:25 – pp – Stephane Richer (4); 18:15 – Brian Rolston (2)
No scoring		Second period	11:58 – Randy McKay (7)
Mikael Renberg (6) – pp – 16:29		Third period	10:11 – Claude Lemieux (11)
Ron Hextall 25 saves / 29 shots		Goalie stats	Martin Brodeur 14 saves / 16 shots

New Jersey won series 4–2

=== Western Conference final ===
==== (1) Detroit Red Wings vs. (4) Chicago Blackhawks ====
This was the 14th playoff series between these two teams, with Chicago winning eight of the thirteen previous series. They last met in the 1992 Norris Division Final where Chicago swept Detroit in four games. This was the seventh conference final appearance for Chicago and first since 1992 where the Blackhawks swept Edmonton in four games. Detroit made their third conference final appearance and first since losing to Edmonton in five games in 1988. The Red Wings defeated the Blackhawks in five games to return to the Stanley Cup Finals for the first time since 1966.

Game one of the series at the Joe Louis Arena in Detroit saw a goaltending battle between Ed Belfour and Mike Vernon. The two teams skated to a 1–1 tie after regulation before Nicklas Lidstrom scored the game-winning goal for Detroit at 1:01 of the first overtime period. It was the first overtime playoff game that Detroit had won at home since 1960. In game two Chicago led by a score of 2–1 after two periods on goals by Chris Chelios and Tony Amonte. In the third period, Detroit kept pressing and eventually tied the game on Doug Brown's goal. Kris Draper scored the winner for Detroit with just 1:45 remaining in regulation. In game three of the series at the United Center, Detroit led 3–2 going into the third period. Jeff Shantz scored at 8:33 to tie the game for Chicago. The game went to double overtime where Vladimir Konstantinov scored the game-winner for Detroit at 9:25. The win gave the Red Wings a commanding 3–0 series lead. The Blackhawks responded to the urgency and came out flying in game four as Denis Savard and Joe Murphy both scored twice and captain Dirk Graham had a goal to give Chicago a dominating 5–0 lead after 40 minutes. Detroit scored twice in the third period on goals by Kris Draper and Ray Sheppard as the Blackhawks went on to win the game 5–2. In game five Chicago jumped out to a 1–0 lead on Denis Savard's power play goal at 10:18 of the first period. Detroit then tied the game on captain Steve Yzerman's goal at 11:36 of the second. After a scoreless third period the game went into double overtime where Vyacheslav Kozlov scored at 2:25 to give the Red Wings a 2–1 win and a series clinching victory.

June 1	Chicago Blackhawks	1–2	OT	Detroit Red Wings	Joe Louis Arena	Recap
Joe Murphy (7) – pp – 15:19		First period		No scoring
No scoring		Second period		02:26 – Keith Primeau (3)
No scoring		Third period		No scoring
No scoring		First overtime period		01:01 – Nicklas Lidstrom (4)
Ed Belfour 22 saves / 24 shots		Goalie stats		Mike Vernon 13 saves / 14 shots

June 4	Chicago Blackhawks	2–3	Detroit Red Wings	Joe Louis Arena	Recap
Chris Chelios (4) – 07:59		First period	16:43 – pp – Dino Ciccarelli (8)
Tony Amonte (3) – 11:07		Second period	No scoring
No scoring		Third period	07:57 – Doug Brown (4); 18:15 – Kris Draper (3)
Ed Belfour 35 saves / 38 shots		Goalie stats	Mike Vernon 18 saves / 20 shots

June 6	Detroit Red Wings	4–3	2OT	Chicago Blackhawks	United Center	Recap
Keith Primeau (4) – pp – 18:31		First period		07:23 – pp – Denis Savard (4)
Stu Grimson (1) – 05:32; Paul Coffey (5) – pp – 13:20		Second period		03:02 – pp – Bernie Nicholls (1)
No scoring		Third period		08:33 – Jeff Shantz (3)
Vladimir Konstantinov (1) – 09:25		Second overtime period		No scoring
Mike Vernon 26 saves / 29 shots		Goalie stats		Ed Belfour 47 saves / 51 shots

June 8	Detroit Red Wings	2–5	Chicago Blackhawks	United Center	Recap
No scoring		First period	07:07 – Denis Savard (5); 11:18 – Joe Murphy (8); 16:41 – Dirk Graham (2)
No scoring		Second period	04:08 – Denis Savard (6); 18:03 – pp – Joe Murphy (9)
Kris Draper (4) – 04:49; Ray Sheppard (4) – 10:25		Third period	No scoring
Mike Vernon 6 saves / 10 shots Chris Osgood 13 saves / 14 shots		Goalie stats	Ed Belfour 21 saves / 23 shots

June 11	Chicago Blackhawks	1–2	2OT	Detroit Red Wings	Joe Louis Arena	Recap
Denis Savard (7) – pp – 10:18		First period		No scoring
No scoring		Second period		11:36 – Steve Yzerman (3)
No scoring		Third period		No scoring
No scoring		Second overtime period		02:25 – Vyacheslav Kozlov (8)
Ed Belfour 45 saves / 47 shots		Goalie stats		Mike Vernon 25 saves / 26 shots

Detroit won series 4–1

== Stanley Cup Final ==
This was the first playoff meeting between these two teams. Detroit made their nineteenth appearance in the Final, and first since 1966 where they lost to the Montreal Canadiens in six games. New Jersey made their first Final appearance in their twenty-first season after entering the league in 1974 as the Kansas City Scouts. Detroit last won the Stanley Cup in 1955. In a significant upset given their regular season point differential, the fifth-seeded Devils swept the Presidents' Trophy-winning Red Wings to win the Stanley Cup for the first time in franchise history.

June 17	New Jersey Devils	2–1	Detroit Red Wings	Joe Louis Arena	Recap
No scoring		First period	No scoring
Stephane Richer (5) – pp – 09:41		Second period	13:08 – pp – Dino Ciccarelli (9)
Claude Lemieux (12) – 03:17		Third period	No scoring
Martin Brodeur 16 saves / 17 shots		Goalie stats	Mike Vernon 26 saves / 28 shots

June 20	New Jersey Devils	4–2	Detroit Red Wings	Joe Louis Arena	Recap
No scoring		First period	No scoring
John MacLean (5) – 09:40		Second period	07:17 – pp – Vyacheslav Kozlov (9)
Scott Niedermayer (4) – 09:47; Jim Dowd (2) – 18:36; Stephane Richer (6) – en – 19:39		Third period	01:36 – Sergei Federov (5)
Martin Brodeur 16 saves / 18 shots		Goalie stats	Mike Vernon 19 saves / 22 shots

June 22	Detroit Red Wings	2–5	New Jersey Devils	Brendan Byrne Arena	Recap
No scoring		First period	10:30 – pp – Bruce Driver (1); 16:52 – Claude Lemieux (13)
No scoring		Second period	06:59 – Neal Broten (5); 08:20 – Randy McKay (8)
Sergei Fedorov (6) – pp – 16:57; Steve Yzerman (4) – pp – 18:27		Third period	08:14 – pp – Bobby Holik (4)
Mike Vernon 16 saves / 20 shots Chris Osgood 10 saves / 11 shots		Goalie stats	Martin Brodeur 22 saves / 24 shots

June 24	Detroit Red Wings	2–5	New Jersey Devils	Brendan Byrne Arena	Recap
Sergei Federov (7) – 02:03; Paul Coffey (6) – sh – 13:01		First period	01:08 – Neal Broten (6); 17:45 – Shawn Chambers (3)
No scoring		Second period	07:56 – Neal Broten (7)
No scoring		Third period	07:46 – Sergei Brylin (1); 12:32 – Shawn Chambers (4)
Mike Vernon 21 saves / 26 shots		Goalie stats	Martin Brodeur 14 saves / 16 shots

New Jersey won series 4–0

== Playoff statistics ==
=== Skaters ===
These are the top ten skaters based on points.

Player	Team	GP	G	A	Pts	+/–	PIM
Sergei Fedorov	Detroit Red Wings	17	7	17	24	+13	6
Stephane Richer	New Jersey Devils	19	6	15	21	+9	2
Neal Broten	New Jersey Devils	20	7	12	19	+13	6
Ron Francis	Pittsburgh Penguins	12	6	13	19	+3	4
Denis Savard	Chicago Blackhawks	16	7	11	18	+12	10
Paul Coffey	Detroit Red Wings	18	6	12	18	+4	10
John MacLean	New Jersey Devils	20	5	13	18	+8	14
Claude Lemieux	New Jersey Devils	20	13	3	16	+12	20
Vyacheslav Kozlov	Detroit Red Wings	18	9	7	16	+12	10
Nicklas Lidstrom	Detroit Red Wings	18	4	12	16	+4	8

=== Goaltenders ===
This is a combined table of the top five goaltenders based on goals against average and the top five goaltenders based on save percentage, with at least 420 minutes played. The table is sorted by GAA, and the criteria for inclusion are bolded.

Player	Team	GP	W	L	SA	GA	GAA	SV%	SO	TOI
Martin Brodeur	New Jersey Devils	20	16	4	463	34	**1.67**	**.927**	3	1221:58
Ed Belfour	Chicago Blackhawks	16	9	7	479	37	**2.19**	**.923**	1	1013:38
Mike Vernon	Detroit Red Wings	18	12	6	370	41	**2.31**	.889	1	1063:17
Ron Hextall	Philadelphia Flyers	15	10	5	437	42	**2.81**	**.904**	0	896:41
Felix Potvin	Toronto Maple Leafs	7	3	4	253	20	**2.83**	**.921**	1	423:41

== See also ==
- 1994–95 NHL season
- List of NHL seasons

Preceded by 1994 Stanley Cup playoffs	Stanley Cup playoffs 1995	Succeeded by 1996 Stanley Cup playoffs
