= 1994 Stanley Cup Final =

1994 ice hockey championship series

	1	2	3	4	5	6	7	Total
New York Rangers	2*	3	5	4	3	1	3	4
Vancouver Canucks	3*	1	1	2	6	4	2	3
- * – Denotes overtime period(s)
- Location(s): New York City: Madison Square Garden (1, 2, 5, 7); Vancouver: Pacific Coliseum (3, 4, 6)
- Coaches: New York: Mike Keenan; Vancouver: Pat Quinn
- Captains: New York: Mark Messier; Vancouver: Trevor Linden
- National anthems: New York: John Amirante; Vancouver: Richard Loney (3); John Reynolds (4, 6)
- Referees: Terry Gregson (1, 4, 7); Bill McCreary (2, 6); Andy Van Hellemond (3, 5)
- Dates: May 31 – June 14, 1994
- MVP: Brian Leetch (Rangers)
- Series-winning goal: Mark Messier (13:29, second)
- Hall of Famers: Rangers: Glenn Anderson (2008); Brian Leetch (2009); Kevin Lowe (2020); Mark Messier (2007); Sergei Zubov (2019); Canucks: Pavel Bure (2012); Coaches: Pat Quinn (2016); Officials: Bill McCreary (2014); Ray Scapinello (2008); Andy Van Hellemond (1999)
- Networks: Canada: (English): CBC (French): SRC; United States: (National): ESPN (New York City area): MSG Network (1–3, 6–7), MSG II (4–5)
- Announcers: (CBC) Bob Cole, Harry Neale, and Dick Irvin Jr. (SRC) Claude Quenneville and Gilles Tremblay (ESPN) Gary Thorne and Bill Clement (MSG/MSGII) Sam Rosen and John Davidson

The 1994 Stanley Cup Final was the championship series of the National Hockey League's (NHL) 1993–94 season, and the culmination of the 1994 Stanley Cup playoffs. It was contested between the Eastern Conference champion New York Rangers and Western Conference champion Vancouver Canucks. The Canucks were making the club's second Finals appearance, their first coming during their Cinderella run of 1982, and the Rangers were making their tenth appearance, their first since 1979. The Rangers, despite losing a 3–1 series lead, ended their then record 54-year championship drought with a victory in Game 7 to claim the long-awaited Stanley Cup. It was their fourth championship in franchise history.

The Hockey Night in Canada broadcast of the deciding game seven attracted an average Canadian audience of 4.957 million viewers, making it the most watched CBC Sports program in history to that time. The next Stanley Cup Final with games played in Canada was in 2004, and the next to go the full seven games was in 2001.

The Rangers' victory marked the start of what is currently 32 consecutive Stanley Cup championships for American-based teams, as the most recent Canadian team to win the Stanley Cup is the Montreal Canadiens, who did so in 1993.

== Paths to the Finals ==
=== Vancouver Canucks ===
The Canucks entered the playoffs seeded seventh in the Western Conference, and overcame a three-games-to-one deficit against the second-seeded Calgary Flames, winning the final three games in overtime with Game 7 ending in double overtime as Pavel Bure scored the winning goal on a breakaway to upset the Flames. They then upset the fourth-seeded Dallas Stars in the second round in five games. In the Conference Finals, the Canucks upset the third-seeded Toronto Maple Leafs in five games to capture their second Western Conference title. This was the Canucks’ first appearance in the Stanley Cup Final since 1982, where they were previously swept by the Rangers’ cross-town rivals in the New York Islanders.

=== New York Rangers ===
The Rangers entered the playoffs with the league's best record, then swept their New York-area rival New York Islanders and then beat the Washington Capitals in five games, before falling behind three games to two in the Eastern Conference Finals against their Hudson River rivals, New Jersey Devils. They then won Game 6 by a 4–2 score after team captain Mark Messier publicly guaranteed a victory and then scored a third-period hat trick. The Rangers then won Game 7 by a 2–1 score on Stéphane Matteau's goal in double overtime, prompting the call of "Matteau, Matteau, Matteau!" by Rangers radio announcer Howie Rose. It was Matteau's second double overtime goal of the series.

== Game summaries ==
This series brought together two assistant coaches who were teammates on the other Canucks team to reach the Finals: Rangers assistant coach Colin Campbell and Canucks assistant coach Stan Smyl, who served as team captain then, as Kevin McCarthy was injured.

It was the second straight Finals that featured a former Edmonton Oilers captain trying to become the first person to win a Stanley Cup as captain on two different teams. The previous year, Wayne Gretzky, who captained the Oilers to the first four of their five Stanley Cups in the 1980s, captained the Los Angeles Kings to the finals, which they lost to the Montreal Canadiens. Here, it was Mark Messier of the Rangers, who captained the Oilers to the last of their five, in 1990.

The Rangers players had a decided edge in Finals experience, with seven players from the 1990 Oilers, including Messier, Glenn Anderson, Jeff Beukeboom, Adam Graves, Kevin Lowe, Craig MacTavish, and Esa Tikkanen. One 1990 Oiler, Martin Gelinas, was playing for the Canucks. Overall, the Rangers had eleven players with previous Finals appearances, compared to the Canucks' five. In addition, three of the Rangers (Messier, Anderson, and Lowe) were each making their seventh appearance in the Stanley Cup Final (each having made their first six with Edmonton).

With the Rangers having 112 points in the regular-season standing and the Canucks 85, the 27-point difference was the largest point differential between two teams in the Stanley Cup Final since 1982, when there was a 41-point difference between the New York Islanders (118) and the Canucks (77).

=== Game one ===
May 31	Vancouver Canucks	3–2	OT	New York Rangers	Madison Square Garden	Recap

The Rangers scored early and led 2–1 late in the third period before Martin Gélinas tied the game with 1:00 to play in regulation time. It was the third time in eight games that the Rangers had surrendered a last-minute tying goal. The Rangers were all over the Canucks in overtime, but goaltender Kirk McLean made 52 saves on the night. In the last minute of the first overtime, Brian Leetch hit the crossbar at one end, and the Canucks went down to score the winner at the other on an odd-man rush by Greg Adams, as the Rangers, once again, lost a series opener at home in overtime.

Scoring summary
Period	Team	Goal	Assist(s)	Time	Score
1st	NYR	Steve Larmer (6)	Alexei Kovalev (10) and Brian Leetch (18)	03:32	1–0 NYR
2nd	None				
3rd	VAN	Bret Hedican (1)	Greg Adams (7) and Jyrki Lumme (8)	05:45	1–1
3rd	NYR	Alexei Kovalev (6)	Brian Leetch (19) and Sergei Zubov (10)	08:29	2–1 NYR
3rd	VAN	Martin Gelinas (5)	Cliff Ronning (5) and Sergio Momesso (4)	19:00	2–2
OT	VAN	Greg Adams (6)	Cliff Ronning (6) and Pavel Bure (11)	19:26	3–2 VAN
Penalty summary
Period	Team	Player	Penalty	Time	PIM
1st	NYR	Jay Wells	Cross-checking	01:47	2:00
1st	VAN	Trevor Linden	Tripping	02:27	2:00
1st	VAN	John McIntyre	Roughing	08:50	2:00
1st	VAN	Murray Craven	Slashing	10:35	2:00
1st	NYR	Jeff Beukeboom	Interference	15:54	2:00
2nd	NYR	Mark Messier	Hooking	00:20	2:00
2nd	NYR	Doug Lidster	Tripping	08:49	2:00
2nd	NYR	Kevin Lowe	Roughing	08:50	2:00
2nd	VAN	Geoff Courtnall	Interference	13:18	2:00
2nd	VAN	Sergio Momesso	Goaltender interference	16:15	2:00
2nd	NYR	Jeff Beukeboom	High-sticking	19:34	2:00
3rd	None				
OT	NYR	Greg Gilbert	Roughing	09:31	2:00
OT	VAN	Sergio Momesso	Roughing	09:31	2:00

Shots by period
Team	1	2	3	OT	Total
Vancouver	10	5	7	9	31
New York	15	9	13	17	54

=== Game two ===
June 2	Vancouver Canucks	1–3	New York Rangers	Madison Square Garden	Recap

The Rangers evened the series with a 3–1 victory before the series shifted west.

Scoring summary
Period	Team	Goal	Assist(s)	Time	Score
1st	NYR	Doug Lidster (1)	Unassisted	06:22	1–0 NYR
1st	VAN	Sergio Momesso (3)	Cliff Ronning (7) and Bret Hedican (4)	14:04	1–1
2nd	NYR	Glenn Anderson (2)	Mark Messier (14)	11:42	2–1 NYR
3rd	NYR	Brian Leetch (7)	Unassisted	19:55	3–1 NYR
Penalty summary
Period	Team	Player	Penalty	Time	PIM
1st	VAN	Murray Craven	Tripping	02:03	2:00
1st	NYR	Doug Lidster	Interference	07:44	2:00
1st	VAN	Tim Hunter	Roughing	10:21	2:00
1st	VAN	Tim Hunter	Misconduct	15:26	10:00
1st	NYR	Glenn Anderson	Interference	16:55	2:00
2nd	VAN	Jeff Brown	Hooking	00:20	2:00
2nd	NYR	Stephane Matteau	Holding	06:12	2:00
2nd	NYR	Adam Graves	Tripping	10:35	2:00
2nd	VAN	Shawn Antoski	Roughing	13:58	2:00
2nd	NYR	Esa Tikkanen	Goaltender interference	17:08	2:00
3rd	NYR	Doug Lidster	Interference	01:43	2:00
3rd	NYR	Alexei Kovalev	High-sticking	04:32	2:00
3rd	VAN	Gerald Diduck	High-sticking	04:32	2:00
3rd	NYR	Stephane Matteau	Roughing	15:29	2:00
3rd	VAN	Jeff Brown	Roughing	15:29	2:00

Shots by period
Team	1	2	3	Total
Vancouver	10	6	13	29
New York	14	13	13	40

=== Game three ===
June 4	New York Rangers	5–1	Vancouver Canucks	Pacific Coliseum	Recap

The Canucks came storming out in front of their home fans and Pavel Bure scored on his first shift to give them the early lead. But late in the period, with the score tied 1–1, Bure hit Jay Wells in the face with his stick and cut him, leading to a major penalty and Bure's expulsion from the game. Alexei Kovalev scored a breakaway shorthanded goal, which was featured on the cover of NHL 95. Glenn Anderson scored on the ensuing power-play and the Rangers then cruised to a 5–1 victory.

Scoring summary
Period	Team	Goal	Assist(s)	Time	Score
1st	VAN	Pavel Bure (14)	Trevor Linden (12) and Greg Adams (8)	01:03	1–0 VAN
1st	NYR	Brian Leetch (8)	Unassisted	13:39	1–1
1st	NYR	Glenn Anderson (3)	Sergei Nemchinov (4) and Jeff Beukeboom (5)	19:19	2–1 NYR
2nd	NYR	Brian Leetch (9)	Esa Tikkanen (4) and Jeff Beukeboom (6)	18:32	3–1 NYR
3rd	NYR	Steve Larmer (7)	Unassisted	00:25	4–1 NYR
3rd	NYR	Alexei Kovalev (7) – pp	Adam Graves (5) and Mark Messier (15)	13:03	5–1 NYR
Penalty summary
Period	Team	Player	Penalty	Time	PIM
1st	NYR	Jay Wells	Cross-checking	02:54	2:00
1st	NYR	Glenn Anderson	Roughing	05:42	2:00
1st	VAN	Tim Hunter	Charging	05:42	2:00
1st	VAN	Jyrki Lumme	Holding	09:57	2:00
1st	NYR	Craig MacTavish	Holding	15:04	2:00
1st	NYR	Brian Leetch	Tripping	17:56	2:00
1st	NYR	Kevin Lowe	High-sticking	18:12	2:00
1st	NYR	Mark Messier	Roughing	18:12	2:00
1st	VAN	Sergio Momesso	Roughing	18:12	2:00
1st	VAN	Cliff Ronning	High-sticking	18:12	2:00
1st	VAN	Pavel Bure	High-sticking – major	18:12	5:00
1st	VAN	Pavel Bure	Game misconduct	18:12	10:00
2nd	NYR	Kevin Lowe	Roughing	05:34	2:00
2nd	NYR	Mark Messier	Roughing	16:28	2:00
2nd	VAN	Shawn Antoski	Roughing	16:28	2:00
3rd	NYR	Esa Tikkanen	Hooking	03:13	2:00
3rd	VAN	Bret Hedican	Holding	05:34	2:00
3rd	VAN	John McIntyre	Holding	07:58	2:00
3rd	NYR	Craig MacTavish	Holding	09:46	2:00
3rd	VAN	Sergio Momesso	Cross-checking	11:42	2:00
3rd	VAN	Martin Gelinas	Roughing	16:35	2:00
3rd	VAN	Shawn Antoski	Cross-checking	19:19	2:00
3rd	VAN	Shawn Antoski	Roughing	19:19	2:00

Shots by period
Team	1	2	3	Total
New York	11	5	9	25
Vancouver	9	10	6	25

=== Game four ===
June 7	New York Rangers	4–2	Vancouver Canucks	Pacific Coliseum	Recap

In the fourth game, the Canucks again jumped out to an early lead, this time 2–0, before Mike Richter and Brian Leetch took over the game. Richter made some key saves to keep the game within reach, including one on a penalty shot against Pavel Bure, and Leetch picked up a goal and three assists as the Rangers won 4–2 to take a commanding 3–1 series lead.

Scoring summary
Period	Team	Goal	Assist(s)	Time	Score
1st	VAN	Trevor Linden (10) - pp	Jyrki Lumme (9) and Jeff Brown (9)	13:25	1–0 VAN
1st	VAN	Cliff Ronning (5)	Pavel Bure (12) and Murray Craven (8)	16:19	2–0 VAN
2nd	NYR	Brian Leetch (10)	Craig MacTavish (4) and Greg Gilbert (3)	04:03	2–1 VAN
2nd	NYR	Sergei Zubov (5) – pp	Mark Messier (16) and Brian Leetch (20)	19:44	2–2
3rd	NYR	Alexei Kovalev (8) – pp	Brian Leetch (21) and Sergei Zubov (11)	15:05	3–2 NYR
3rd	NYR	Steve Larmer (8)	Sergei Zubov (12) and Brian Leetch (22)	17:56	4–2 NYR
Penalty summary
Period	Team	Player	Penalty	Time	PIM
1st	VAN	Geoff Courtnall	Elbowing	03:11	2:00
1st	NYR	Jeff Beukeboom	High-sticking	06:35	2:00
1st	NYR	Adam Graves	Holding	13:02	2:00
1st	NYR	Mark Messier	Boarding – major	14:17	5:00
1st	VAN	Trevor Linden	Holding the stick	15:07	2:00
1st	VAN	Geoff Courtnall	Interference	17:54	2:00
1st	NYR	Esa Tikkanen	Roughing	18:45	2:00
2nd	NYR	Doug Lidster	Holding	01:13	2:00
2nd	NYR	Brian Leetch	Tripping	06:31	Penalty shot
2nd	VAN	Jeff Brown	Tripping	07:19	2:00
2nd	NYR	Doug Lidster	Holding	16:58	2:00
2nd	VAN	Greg Adams	Boarding	18:55	2:00
3rd	NYR	Bench (served by Joe Kocur)	Too many men on the ice	03:53	2:00
3rd	VAN	Jyrki Lumme	Holding	04:48	2:00
3rd	NYR	Esa Tikkanen	Roughing	10:42	2:00
3rd	VAN	Gerald Diduck	Roughing	10:42	2:00
3rd	NYR	Mark Messier	Slashing	11:29	2:00
3rd	VAN	Martin Gelinas	Roughing	14:31	2:00

Shots by period
Team	1	2	3	Total
New York	8	8	11	27
Vancouver	8	12	10	30

=== Game five ===
June 9	Vancouver Canucks	6–3	New York Rangers	Madison Square Garden	Recap

Most who entered Madison Square Garden for the fifth game thought they were going to see the Rangers win the Cup that night. New York had already set the date for a victory parade. However, the celebration plans got ahead of the work at hand. After a scoreless first period, Jeff Brown opened the scoring eight minutes into the second period. Vancouver added onto their lead to make with goals in the first two minutes of the third period before the Rangers responded with three goals of their own to lend hope with eleven minutes to play. However, the tie lasted all of 29 seconds before Dave Babych gave Vancouver the lead again to start a run of three unanswered goals for the Canucks to send the series back to Vancouver.

Scoring summary
Period	Team	Goal	Assist(s)	Time	Score
1st	None				
2nd	VAN	Jeff Brown (4)	Cliff Ronning (8) and Shawn Antoski (1)	08:10	1–0 VAN
3rd	VAN	Geoff Courtnall (6)	Nathan LaFayette (5) and Bret Hedican (5)	00:26	2–0 VAN
3rd	VAN	Pavel Bure (15)	Murray Craven (9)	02:48	3–0 VAN
3rd	NYR	Doug Lidster (2)	Alexei Kovalev (11)	03:27	3–1 VAN
3rd	NYR	Steve Larmer (9)	Stephane Matteau (3) and Sergei Nemchinov (5)	06:20	3–2 VAN
3rd	NYR	Mark Messier (11)	Glenn Anderson (3) and Adam Graves (6)	09:02	3–3
3rd	VAN	Dave Babych (3)	Pavel Bure (13)	09:31	4–3 VAN
3rd	VAN	Geoff Courtnall (7)	Nathan LaFayette (6) and Jyrki Lumme (10)	12:20	5–3 VAN
3rd	VAN	Pavel Bure (16)	Cliff Ronning (9) and Bret Hedican (6)	13:04	6–3 VAN
Penalty summary
Period	Team	Player	Penalty	Time	PIM
1st	VAN	Tim Hunter	Elbowing	00:49	2:00
1st	NYR	Jeff Beukeboom	Instigator	10:06	2:00
1st	NYR	Jeff Beukeboom	Fighting – major	10:06	5:00
1st	NYR	Jeff Beukeboom	Game misconduct	10:06	10:00
1st	NYR	Stephane Matteau	Roughing	10:06	2:00
1st	NYR	Jay Wells	High-sticking	10:06	2:00
1st	VAN	Sergio Momesso	Slashing	10:06	2:00
1st	VAN	Sergio Momesso	Fighting – major	10:06	5:00
1st	VAN	Cliff Ronning	Roughing	10:06	2:00
1st	NYR	Jay Wells	Roughing	13:20	2:00
1st	VAN	Tim Hunter	Roughing	13:20	2:00
1st	NYR	Steve Larmer	Holding	17:20	2:00
1st	VAN	Cliff Ronning	Holding	17:20	2:00
1st	NYR	Sergei Nemchinov	Elbowing	19:32	2:00
2nd	VAN	Geoff Courtnall	Elbowing – major	10:13	5:00
2nd	NYR	Mark Messier	Hooking	18:19	2:00
3rd	NYR	Joey Kocur	Slashing	18:41	2:00

Shots by period
Team	1	2	3	Total
Vancouver	12	8	17	37
New York	10	13	15	38

=== Game six ===
June 11	New York Rangers	1–4	Vancouver Canucks	Pacific Coliseum	Recap

The Canucks fired 14 shots at Mike Richter in the first period and led 1–0 on a Jeff Brown bullet from the point. The score was 2–1 after two periods before another Brown goal gave the Canucks a 3–1 third-period lead. The Rangers had a Glenn Anderson goal be overturned on video replay. Late in the third, Geoff Courtnall appeared to score for the Canucks, but the play continued and the Rangers scored to temporarily make the score 3–2. But, in the ensuing video review, it was confirmed that Courtnall had indeed scored his second goal of the game to clinch the game for the Canucks and force a seventh game, the first in the finals since 1987.

Scoring summary
Period	Team	Goal	Assist(s)	Time	Score
1st	VAN	Jeff Brown (5) – pp	Trevor Linden (13)	09:42	1–0 VAN
2nd	VAN	Geoff Courtnall (8)	Jyrki Lumme (11) and Pavel Bure (14)	12:29	2–0 VAN
2nd	NYR	Alexei Kovalev (9) – pp	Mark Messier (17) and Brian Leetch (23)	14:42	2–1 VAN
3rd	VAN	Jeff Brown (6)	Unassisted	08:35	3–1 VAN
3rd	VAN	Geoff Courtnall (9)	Nathan LaFayette (7) and Gerald Diduck (7)	18:28	4–1 VAN
Penalty summary
Period	Team	Player	Penalty	Time	PIM
1st	NYR	Jeff Beukeboom	Elbowing	03:02	2:00
1st	NYR	Brian Leetch	Interference	09:39	2:00
2nd	VAN	Sergio Momesso	Interference	02:26	2:00
2nd	VAN	Gerald Diduck	Tripping	07:27	2:00
2nd	VAN	John McIntyre	Interference	13:23	2:00
3rd	None				

Shots by period
Team	1	2	3	Total
New York	7	12	10	29
Vancouver	16	8	7	31

=== Game seven ===
June 14	Vancouver Canucks	2–3	New York Rangers	Madison Square Garden	Recap

For the second time since 1971 and the tenth time overall, the Finals went to seven games. Rangers coach Mike Keenan became the first person to be a head coach in game sevens of the Stanley Cup Final for two different teams. Keenan had coached the Philadelphia Flyers in 1987 when they lost to the Edmonton Oilers. Mike Babcock would join him in this feat in 2009 while with the Detroit Red Wings, having been with the Mighty Ducks of Anaheim when they lost to the New Jersey Devils in 2003 (the home team won all seven games of the series).

The game at Madison Square Garden was an "electric affair" with the Rangers jumping to an early 2–0 lead at the 15-minute mark after scoring twice within four minutes on goals by Brian Leetch and Adam Graves. However, Canucks captain Trevor Linden silenced the home crowd with a short-handed goal early in the second period to make it 2–1. Mark Messier restored order for the home crowd with a power play goal, only to have Linden make it close again. After that, it was "hectic, jittery hockey," Nathan LaFayette "frightened all Manhattan wobbling a loose puck" off the post behind Mike Richter with six minutes left. There were three face-offs in the Rangers' zone in the final 37 seconds, the last coming with 1.6 seconds on the clock.

Mark Messier featured in two of the most memorable and iconic images of the Final: first, leaping in excitement as ticker tape fell at the end of the game, and then showing incredible emotion as he accepted the Stanley Cup from NHL Commissioner Gary Bettman, as he became the first and only player to captain two different teams to the Stanley Cup. At the time Messier was credited for the game-winning goal earning him the tongue-in-cheek nickname of "Mr. June"; however, Messier admitted in 2017 that the game-winning goal was likely scored by Brian Noonan.

Scoring summary
Period	Team	Goal	Assist(s)	Time	Score
1st	NYR	Brian Leetch (11)	Sergei Zubov (13) and Mark Messier (18)	11:02	1–0 NYR
1st	NYR	Adam Graves (10) – pp	Alexei Kovalev (12) and Sergei Zubov (14)	14:45	2–0 NYR
2nd	VAN	Trevor Linden (11) – sh	Brian Glynn (3) and Pavel Bure (15)	05:21	2–1 NYR
2nd	NYR	Mark Messier (12) – pp	Adam Graves (7) and Brian Noonan (7)	13:29	3–1 NYR
3rd	VAN	Trevor Linden (12) – pp	Geoff Courtnall (10) and Cliff Ronning (10)	04:50	3–2 NYR
Penalty summary
Period	Team	Player	Penalty	Time	PIM
1st	VAN	Jyrki Lumme	Cross-checking	14:03	2:00
1st	VAN	Bret Hedican	Roughing	18:50	2:00
1st	NYR	Esa Tikkanen	Roughing	18:50	2:00
2nd	VAN	Jeff Brown	Interference	04:38	2:00
2nd	VAN	Dave Babych	Tripping	12:46	2:00
2nd	NYR	Mark Messier	Hooking	16:39	2:00
3rd	NYR	Esa Tikkanen	Hooking	04:16	2:00
3rd	NYR	Craig MacTavish	Roughing	10:55	2:00
3rd	VAN	Trevor Linden	Roughing	10:55	2:00

Shots by period
Team	1	2	3	Total
Vancouver	9	12	9	30
New York	12	14	9	35

== Television ==
In Canada, the series was televised in English on the CBC and in French on SRC. In the United States, the series was broadcast on ESPN outside of the New York City market. The local rightsholder, MSG Network broadcast games one, two, three, six, and seven on its main channel, and games four and five on its secondary MSG 2 channel, due to conflicts with the Yankees schedule.

This was the last Cup Finals in which the regional rights holders of the participating U.S. teams produced local telecasts of their respective games. This was also the last Cup Finals to air exclusively on a cable network until 2023, when TNT aired the Finals for the first time ever. Under the American TV contracts that would take effect beginning next season, there would be exclusive national coverage of the Cup Finals, split between Fox Sports and ESPN.

ESPN also sent its broadcasts to a record 120 countries, for a potential audience of 285 million. MSG Network broadcaster Al Trautwig said that the Rangers themselves contributed to those numbers in putting the first Russian names on the Stanley Cup: Alexander Karpovtsev, Alexei Kovalev, Sergei Nemchinov, and Sergei Zubov, giving a huge European audience, including those watching on the brand-new television screens across the former Soviet Union, a Stanley Cup story to remember.

=== Ratings ===
In the United States, game seven was the highest-rated hockey game on cable. ESPN's broadcast drew a 5.2 rating. However, in New York, the ESPN blackout meant MSG Network's broadcast drew 16.2 rating, a record for the network. The two networks combined yielded a 6.9 rating.

With an average Canadian audience of 4.957 million viewers, game seven was the most watched CBC Sports program until the 10.6 million viewers for the men's ice hockey gold medal game between Canada and the United States at the 2002 Winter Olympics, when Canada won its first Olympic ice hockey gold medal since the 1952 Winter Olympics. Bob Cole, who called both games, said that game seven was one of his most memorable TV games.

== Team rosters ==
Bolded years under Finals appearance indicates a year the player won the Stanley Cup.

=== New York Rangers ===
#	Nat	Player	Position	Hand	Acquired	Place of birth	Finals appearance
30	(Canada)	Glenn Healy	G	L	1992–93	Pickering, Ontario	first (did not play)
35	(United States)	Mike Richter	G	L	1985	Abington, Pennsylvania	first
2	(United States)	Brian Leetch – **A**	D	L	1986	Corpus Christi, Texas	first
4	(Canada)	Kevin Lowe – **A**	D	L	1992–93	Lachute, Quebec	seventh (1983, **1984**, **1985**, **1987**, **1988**, **1990**)
6	(Canada)	Doug Lidster	D	R	1993–94	Kamloops, British Columbia	first
21	(Russia)	Sergei Zubov	D	R	1990	Moscow, Soviet Union	first
23	(Canada)	Jeff Beukeboom	D	R	1991–92	Ajax, Ontario	fourth (**1987**, **1988**, **1990**)
24	(Canada)	Jay Wells	D	L	1992–93	Paris, Ontario	first
25	(Russia)	Alexander Karpovtsev	D	R	1993–94	Moscow, Soviet Union	first
9	(Canada)	Adam Graves – **A**	LW	L	1991–92	Toronto, Ontario	second (**1990**)
10	(Finland)	Esa Tikkanen	RW	L	1993–94	Helsinki, Finland	fifth (**1985**, **1987**, **1988**, **1990**)
11	(Canada)	Mark Messier – **C**	C	L	1991–92	Edmonton, Alberta	seventh (1983, **1984**, **1985**, **1987**, **1988**, **1990**)
12	(United States)	Eddie Olczyk	C	L	1992–93	Chicago, Illinois	first (did not play)
13	(Russia)	Sergei Nemchinov	C	L	1990	Moscow, Soviet Union	first
14	(Canada)	Craig MacTavish	C	L	1993–94	London, Ontario	fourth (**1987**, **1988**, **1990**)
15	(Canada)	Mike Hudson	C	L	1993–94	Guelph, Ontario	second (1992)
16	(United States)	Brian Noonan	RW	R	1993–94	Boston, Massachusetts	second (1992)
17	(Canada)	Greg Gilbert	LW	L	1993–94	Mississauga, Ontario	fifth (**1982**, **1983**, 1984, 1992)
18	(United States)	Mike Hartman	LW	L	1992–93	Detroit, Michigan	first (did not play)
19	(Canada)	Nick Kypreos	LW	L	1993–94	Toronto, Ontario	first
26	(Canada)	Joe Kocur	RW	L	1990–91	Kelvington, Saskatchewan	first
27	(Russia)	Alexei Kovalev	RW	L	1991	Tolyatti, Soviet Union	first
28	(Canada)	Steve Larmer – **A**	RW	L	1993–94	Peterborough, Ontario	second (1992)
32	(Canada)	Stephane Matteau	LW	L	1993–94	Rouyn-Noranda, Quebec	second (1992)
36	(Canada)	Glenn Anderson	RW/LW	L	1993–94	Vancouver, British Columbia	seventh (1983, **1984**, **1985**, **1987**, **1988**, **1990**)

=== Vancouver Canucks ===
#	Nat	Player	Position	Hand	Acquired	Place of birth	Finals appearance
1	(Canada)	Kirk McLean	G	L	1987–88	North York, Ontario	first
35	(Canada)	Kay Whitmore	G	L	1992–93	Sudbury, Ontario	first (did not play)
3	(United States)	Bret Hedican	D	L	1993–94	Saint Paul, Minnesota	first
4	(Canada)	Gerald Diduck	D	L	1990–91	Edmonton, Alberta	first
5	(Canada)	Dana Murzyn – **A**	D	L	1990–91	Calgary, Alberta	second (**1989**, did not play)
6	(Canada)	Adrien Plavsic	D	L	1989–90	Montreal, Quebec	first (did not play)
21	(Finland)	Jyrki Lumme	D	L	1989–90	Tampere, Finland	first
22	(Canada)	Jeff Brown	D	R	1993–94	Ottawa, Ontario	first
24	(Czech Republic)	Jiri Slegr	D	L	1990	Jihlava, Czechoslovakia	first (did not play)
28	(Canada)	Brian Glynn	D	R	1993–94	Iserlohn, West Germany	first
44	(Canada)	Dave Babych	D	L	1991–92	Edmonton, Alberta	first
7	(Canada)	Cliff Ronning	C	L	1990–91	Burnaby, British Columbia	first
8	(Canada)	Greg Adams	LW	L	1987–88	Nelson, British Columbia	first
10	(Russia)	Pavel Bure	RW	L	1989	Moscow, Soviet Union	first
14	(Canada)	Geoff Courtnall	LW	L	1990–91	Victoria, British Columbia	second (**1988**)
15	(Canada)	John McIntyre	C	L	1993–94	Ravenswood, Ontario	first
16	(Canada)	Trevor Linden – **C**	C	R	1988	Medicine Hat, Alberta	first
17	(United States)	Jimmy Carson	C	R	1993–94	Southfield, Michigan	second (1993, did not play)
18	(Canada)	Shawn Antoski	LW	L	1990	Brantford, Ontario	first
19	(Canada)	Tim Hunter	RW	R	1992–93	Calgary, Alberta	third (1986, **1989**)
20	(Canada)	Jose Charbonneau	RW	R	1993–94	Ferme-Neuve, Quebec	first (did not play)
23	(Canada)	Martin Gelinas	LW	L	1993–94	Shawinigan, Quebec	second (**1990**)
25	(Canada)	Nathan LaFayette	RW	R	1993–94	New Westminster, British Columbia	first
27	(Canada)	Sergio Momesso – **A**	LW	L	1990–91	Montreal, Quebec	first
29	(Canada)	Gino Odjick	LW	L	1990	Maniwaki, Quebec	first (did not play)
32	(Canada)	Murray Craven	C	L	1992–93	Medicine Hat, Alberta	third (1985, 1987)
33	(Canada)	Michael Peca	C	R	1992	Toronto, Ontario	first (did not play)
30	(Canada)	Mike Fountain	G	L	1992	North York, Ontario	first (did not play)

== Stanley Cup engraving ==
The 1994 Stanley Cup was presented to Rangers captain Mark Messier by NHL Commissioner Gary Bettman following the Rangers 3–2 win over the Canucks in game seven.

The following Rangers players and staff had their names engraved on the Stanley Cup.

1993–94 New York Rangers

=== Players ===
Centers

- 11 Mark Messier (Captain)
- 12 Eddie Olczyk*
- 13 Sergei Nemchinov
- 14 Craig MacTavish
- 15 Mike Hudson
- 27 Alexei Kovalev

Wingers

- 9 Adam Graves (A)
- 10 Esa Tikkanen
- 16 Brian Noonan
- 17 Greg Gilbert
- 18 Mike Hartman*
- 19 Nick Kypreos
- 26 Joe Kocur
- 28 Steve Larmer (A)
- 32 Stephane Matteau
- 36 Glenn Anderson

Defencemen

- 2 Brian Leetch (A)
- 4 Kevin Lowe (A)
- 6 Doug Lidster
- 21 Sergei Zubov
- 23 Jeff Beukeboom
- 24 Jay Wells
- 25 Alexander Karpovtsev

Goaltenders

- 30 Glenn Healy
- 35 Mike Richter
- * Did not officially qualify, but still engraved on the Stanley Cup.

=== Coaching and administrative staff ===
- Neil Smith (President/General Manager/Governor). Robert Gutkowski (Alt. Governor)
- Stanley Jaffe (Alt. Governor), Kenneth Munoz (Alt. Governor)
- Larry Pleau (Asst. General Manager), Mike Keenan (Head Coach)
- Colin Campbell (Associate Coach), Dick Todd (Asst. Coach)
- Matthew Loughran (Manager of Team Operations), Barry Watkins (Director of Communications)
- Christer Rockstrom (Scout), Tony Feltrin (Scout)
- Martin Madden (Scout), Herb Hammond (Scout), Darwin Bennett (Scout)
- Dave Smith (Medical trainer), Joe Murphy (Equipment trainer)
- Mike Folga (Equipment Manager), Bruce Lifrieri (Massage Therapist)

=== Engraving notes ===
- When the New York Rangers submitted the list of names for engraving, #12 Eddie Olczyk (C) and #18 Mike Hartman (LW) were included, although they fell short of the official requirements of 41 regular season games, or participation in the Finals. When the Stanley Cup was engraved, Olczyk and Hartman's names were omitted. (Olczyk had played 37 regular-season games and one game in the Eastern Conference Finals. Hartman had played 35 regular-season games and none in the playoffs.) Both players had spent the entire season with New York, and missed extensive time due to injury. At the Rangers' protest, the NHL added Olczyk and Hartman to the Cup. The NHL no longer adds missing names after the Cup has been engraved, though since 1994, it allows teams to petition for the inclusion of players who do not officially qualify.
- Seven players who won the cup in 1994 were also with the Edmonton Oilers in 1990 when they won their fifth Cup: Mark Messier, Kevin Lowe, Glenn Anderson, Jeff Beukeboom, Adam Graves, Craig MacTavish and Esa Tikkanen.
- Greg Gilbert won the Stanley Cup with the New York Islanders in 1982 and 1983, making him the only player in NHL history to earn Stanley Cup rings with both New York franchises.
- Alexander Karpovtsev, Alexei Kovalev, Sergei Nemchinov and Sergei Zubov became the first four Russian-trained players to have their names engraved on the Stanley Cup.

== See also ==
- List of Stanley Cup champions
- 1994 Vancouver Stanley Cup riot

Preceded by Montreal Canadiens; 1993	New York Rangers; Stanley Cup champions 1994	Succeeded by New Jersey Devils; 1995
