= 41st National Hockey League All-Star Game =

Professional ice hockey exhibition game

41st NHL All-Star Game
| | 1 | 2 | 3 | Total |
|---|---|---|---|---|
| Campbell | 2 | 2 | 3 | 7 |
| Wales | 7 | 2 | 3 | 12 |
- Date: January 21, 1990
- Arena: Civic Arena
- City: Pittsburgh
- MVP: Mario Lemieux (Pittsburgh)
- Attendance: 16,236

The 41st National Hockey League All-Star Game was held in Civic Arena in Pittsburgh, home to the Pittsburgh Penguins, on January 21, 1990. The game saw the team of all-stars from the Wales Conference defeat the Campbell Conference all-stars 12–7. The Montreal Canadiens were slated to host the 41st All-Star Game but withdrew their bid to considerations due to the hosting by Quebec City of Rendez-Vous '87. This had allowed the Penguins, who wanted to host an All-Star Game in 1993, to move up three years early.

For its part, Pittsburgh's organizers added much more to previous games, creating the first "true" All-Star weekend. First was the addition of the Heroes of Hockey game, a two-period oldtimers' game between past NHL greats. The second was the addition of the National Hockey League All-Star Skills Competition, a competition between the players invited to the All-Star Game.

To accommodate the altered activities, the game itself was played on a Sunday afternoon instead of a Tuesday night, as was the case in previous years. This allowed American broadcaster NBC to air the game live across the United States – marking the first time that a national audience would see Wayne Gretzky and Mario Lemieux play. Referees and other officials were also wired with microphones in this game, as were the two head coaches. Finally, NBC was allowed to conduct interviews with players during stoppages in play, to the chagrin of the Hockey Night in Canada crew, whose attempts to do likewise were repeatedly denied by the league in past years.

== The Heroes of Hockey ==
The Heroes of Hockey game was a shortened two-period game between the Wales and Campbell alumni – unusual as many of the players invited to play predate the creation of the Wales and Campbell Conferences. This was the only time Wales and Campbell alumni would face off – future editions of games had the home team's alumnus facing the "best of the rest", akin to the All-Star Game format of old.

Among the notable absences of this game, however, was Gordie Howe, who had proposed a similar idea four years earlier in Hartford, but was rebuked by the league.

== Super Skills competition ==
The Super Skills competition was created by Paul Palmer, who adapted the "Showdown" feature seen on Hockey Night in Canada from 1973 to 1980. All-star players would be rewarded with $2,500 for any win in the skills competition. The Campbell Conference won the inaugural competition.

=== Individual event winners ===
- Accuracy Shooting – Ray Bourque (Boston Bruins) – 4 hits, 7 shots
- Hardest Shot – Al Iafrate (Toronto Maple Leafs) – 96.0 mph
- Goaltenders Competition – Kirk McLean (Vancouver Canucks) – 4 GA, 27 shots

== The game ==
The game, at the time, broke many all-star game records: most goals scored by one team, most goals scored by both teams, and most goals in a period were among the more notable ones. Mario Lemieux scored four goals in the game, three on his first three shots and was the second player in All-Star history to score four goals. The inevitable Gretzky–Lemieux comparisons quickly came up, as Gretzky was held off the scoresheet and was on the ice when Lemieux scored all four goals. Not surprisingly, Lemieux was named the game's MVP.

=== Summary ===
| | Wales Conference | Campbell Conference |
|---|---|---|
| Scoring summary | Lemieux (Propp, Neely) 0:21 first; Andreychuk (unassisted) 5:13 first; Turgeon (Francis) 9:22 first; Lemieux (Housley) 13:00 first; Tocchet (Bourque, Muller) 16:55 first; Lemieux (Coffey) 17:37 first; Turgeon (Francis, Andreychuk) 18:52 first; Muller (Coffey, Sakic) 8:47 second (SHG)(GWG); Corson (LaFontaine) 16:43 second; Lemieux (Neely) 1:07 third; Neely (Sakic, Hatcher) 11:20 third; Muller (Tocchet) 17:50 third | Messier (Hull, Smail) 11:01 first; Yzerman (unassisted) 14:31 first; MacInnis (Lowe) 9:03 second (PPG); Mullen (Nicholls) 13:00 second; Robitaille (Yzerman, Hull) 15:09 third; Robitaille (Hull, Yzerman) 16:11 third; Smail (Mullen, Nieuwendyk) 19:35 third |
| Penalties | Roy, delay of game 7:05 second; Neely, tripping 6:17 third | |
| Shots on goal | 16–15–14–45 | 9–11–22–42 |
| Win/loss | W – Patrick Roy | L – Mike Vernon |

- Referee: Kerry Fraser
- Linesmen: Bob Hodges, Dan McCourt
- TV: NBC, TSN, SRC

== Rosters ==
| | Wales Conference | Campbell Conference |
| Head coach | (Canada) Pat Burns (Montreal Canadiens) | (Canada) Terry Crisp (Calgary Flames) |
| Honorary captain | (Canada) Maurice Richard | (Canada) Alex Delvecchio |
|---|---|---|
| Lineup | Starting lineup: (Canada) 7 – D Paul Coffey (Pittsburgh Penguins), Alternate; (Canada) 8 – RW Cam Neely (Boston Bruins); (Canada) 26 – LW Brian Propp (Philadelphia Flyers); (Canada) 33 – G Patrick Roy (Montreal Canadiens); (Canada) 66 – C Mario Lemieux (Pittsburgh Penguins), Captain; (Canada) 77 – D Ray Bourque (Boston Bruins), Alternate; Reserves: (United States) 2 – D Brian Leetch (New York Rangers); (United States) 4 – D Kevin Hatcher (Washington Capitals); (United States) 6 – D Phil Housley (Buffalo Sabres); (Canada) 9 – C Kirk Muller (New Jersey Devils); (Canada) 10 – C Ron Francis (Hartford Whalers); (United States) 16 – C Pat LaFontaine (New York Islanders); (Canada) 17 – C Pierre Turgeon (Buffalo Sabres); (Canada) 19 – C Joe Sakic (Quebec Nordiques); (Canada) 22 – RW Rick Tocchet (Philadelphia Flyers); (United States) 24 – D Chris Chelios (Montreal Canadiens); (Canada) 25 – LW Dave Andreychuk (Buffalo Sabres); (Canada) 27 – C Shayne Corson (Montreal Canadiens); (Canada) 31 – G Daren Puppa (Buffalo Sabres); (Canada) 44 – RW Stephane Richer (Montreal Canadiens) | Starting lineup: (Canada) 2 – D Al MacInnis (Calgary Flames); (Canada) 4 – D Kevin Lowe (Edmonton Oilers); (United States) 16 – RW Brett Hull (St. Louis Blues); (Canada) 20 – LW Luc Robitaille (Los Angeles Kings); (Canada) 30 – G Mike Vernon (Calgary Flames); (Canada) 99 – C Wayne Gretzky (Los Angeles Kings), Captain; Reserves: (Canada) 1 – G Kirk McLean (Vancouver Canucks); (United States) 7 – RW Joe Mullen (Calgary Flames); (Canada) 9 – C Bernie Nicholls (Los Angeles Kings); (Canada) 11 – C Mark Messier (Edmonton Oilers), Alternate; (Canada) 12 – RW Mike Gartner (Minnesota North Stars); (Canada) 14 – D Paul Cavallini (St. Louis Blues); (Finland) 17 – RW Jari Kurri (Edmonton Oilers); (Canada) 19 – C Steve Yzerman (Detroit Red Wings); (Canada) 24 – D Doug Wilson (Chicago Blackhawks), Alternate; (Canada) 25 – LW Doug Smail (Winnipeg Jets); (Canada) 26 – C Joe Nieuwendyk (Calgary Flames); (Canada) 27 – RW Steve Larmer (Chicago Blackhawks); (Canada) 28 – D Steve Duchesne (Los Angeles Kings); (United States) 33 – D Al Iafrate (Toronto Maple Leafs) |

== See also ==
- 1989–90 NHL season

== Notes ==
- Mario Lemieux became the second player in All-Star history to score 4 goals in one game.
- Wales Conference scored 7 goals in the first period to establish an All-Star record for most goals in a period.
- Campbell Conference established 22 shots in the third period, which is tied for second all-time in All-Star history.
- Tied for second for most shots by both teams in one period in All-Star history with 36 (Campbell 22/Wales 14) in the third period.
- Bernie Nicholls was traded to the New York Rangers prior to the game, but remained part of the Campbell conference lineup.
- Denis Savard and Thomas Steen were named to the all-star team, but did not participate.
- This was the first NHL game of any type to air on American network television since May 24, 1980 – game six of the 1980 Stanley Cup on CBS.
