= Kirk McLean =

Canadian ice hockey player

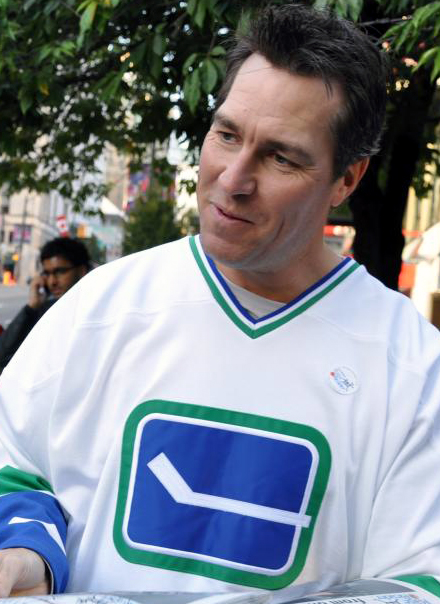
- McLean in 2009
- Born: June 26, 1966 (age 60) North York, Ontario, Canada
- Height: 6 ft 0 in (183 cm)
- Weight: 182 lb (83 kg; 13 st 0 lb)
- Position: Goaltender
- Caught: Left
- Played for: New Jersey Devils; Vancouver Canucks; Carolina Hurricanes; Florida Panthers; New York Rangers
- National team: Canada
- NHL draft: 107th overall, 1984; New Jersey Devils
- Playing career: 1986–2001

Kirk Alan McLean (born June 26, 1966) is a Canadian former professional ice hockey player who was a goaltender in the National Hockey League (NHL) for the New Jersey Devils, Vancouver Canucks, Carolina Hurricanes, Florida Panthers and New York Rangers. He played in the style of a stand-up goaltender.

McLean played major junior hockey with the Oshawa Generals of the Ontario Hockey League (OHL) and was drafted in the sixth round, 107th overall by the Devils in 1984. He played with the Devils' American Hockey League (AHL) affiliate, the Maine Mariners, before being traded to the Canucks in 1987. He is best known for playing more than 10 seasons with the Canucks, during which time he was a finalist for two Vezina Trophies in 1989 and 1992, named to two NHL All-Star Games and received Second All-Star team honours. In 1994, he backstopped the Canucks to the seventh game of the Stanley Cup Final against the Rangers. In 1998, he was traded away and spent the final three seasons of his career with the Hurricanes, Panthers and Rangers, before retiring in 2001.

Since retiring, McLean has been a goaltending coach for the Kamloops Blazers of the Western Hockey League (WHL), worked in broadcasting with the Canucks' pay-per-view telecasts and became a part-owner of the British Columbia Hockey League (BCHL)'s Burnaby Express (now Coquitlam Express). He was involved in the restaurant business in Vancouver. He now works for the Vancouver Canucks as the Ambassador and is a boardmember of the Canuck Alumni Foundation.

== Early life ==
McLean was born in North York, Ontario, on June 26, 1966, and is of Scottish and smaller Irish descent; his mask had his family's Scottish tartan on it. He grew up dreaming of playing for the Toronto Maple Leafs and saw NHL star Bernie Parent as a role model. Playing minor ice hockey in the Metro Toronto Hockey League (MTHL) with the Don Mills Flyers, he recorded a 2.01 goals against average (GAA) over 26 games in the 1982–83 season. He played in the 1979 Quebec International Pee-Wee Hockey Tournament with Don Mills.

== Playing career ==
=== New Jersey Devils (1985–87) ===
McLean played major junior in the Ontario Hockey League (OHL) for three seasons with the Oshawa Generals. Following his rookie season with the Generals, he was drafted by the New Jersey Devils in the 1984 NHL entry draft with their sixth pick, 107th overall. He debuted with the Devils in 1985–86, appearing in two games after being called up from Oshawa on April 2, 1986. McLean had to compete with numerous other goaltenders in the Devils' system for ice time. Following the club's 1987 training camp, he and Craig Billington were sent to their AHL affiliate, the Maine Mariners, while Karl Friesen and Chris Terreri were chosen to backup Alain Chevrier. Sean Burke was also in the Devils' system, although he was playing for the Canadian National Team at the beginning of the season.

McLean was called up from Maine on December 19, 1986, after Friesen was released and Terreri was sidelined with the flu. He arrived in New Jersey three hours before game-time against the Washington Capitals that day. He appeared in relief of Chevrier after the starter allowed three goals in the first 81 seconds. McLean allowed one goal on 24 shots for the rest of the game while earning the win in a 6–4 comeback victory. He appeared in four games during his call-up before being reassigned on January 6, 1987. After his return to the AHL, McLean suffered an injury, damaging cartilage in his right knee during a game on February 15. The injury required arthroscopic surgery. He finished the campaign in Maine with a 15–23–4 record and 3.22 GAA in 45 games. While training in the off-season, McLean injured his left knee and underwent his second arthroscopic surgery on July 29, 1987.

=== Vancouver Canucks (1987–98) ===
==== Arrival to Stanley Cup run (1987–94) ====
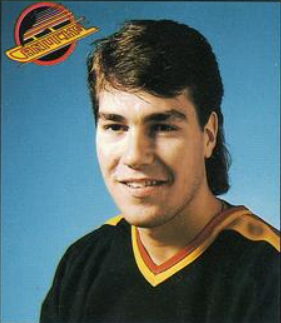
McLean with the Vancouver Canucks in 1987

Leading up to the 1987–88 season, McLean was traded, along with Greg Adams and a second round choice (Leif Rohlin) in the 1988 NHL entry draft, to the Vancouver Canucks for centre Patrik Sundström and the Canucks' second- (Jeff Christian) and fourth-round draft picks (Matt Ruchty) in 1988, on September 15, 1987. The deal constituted the first major transactions by newly appointed Vancouver Canucks and New Jersey Devils general managers Pat Quinn and Lou Lamoriello, respectively. McLean's acquisition was an integral part of Vancouver's rebuilding process, led by Quinn. Within the next two years, McLean was joined in the Canucks organization by additional franchise cornerstones Trevor Linden and Pavel Bure. He became known to fans as "Captain Kirk", in reference to the Star Trek protagonist.

McLean made 14 saves in his Canucks debut, recording an 8–2 win over the St. Louis Blues in the season opener on October 8, 1987. He notched his first NHL career shutout later that season on February 17, 1988, making 27 saves in a 5–0 win against the Pittsburgh Penguins. McLean split playing time with long-time Canucks starter Richard Brodeur in his first season in Vancouver, playing in 41 games with an 11–27–4 record, 3.71 GAA and .875 save percentage. He won his first of three Molson Cups with the Canucks at the end of the season, having earned the most three stars selections on the team.

McLean emerged the following season in 1988–89 with a winning 20–17–3 record, 3.08 GAA and .891 save percentage. Early in the season, he returned to New Jersey in a game against the Devils and recorded a shutout against his former team in a 4–0 Canucks win on October 20, 1988. He went on to receive his first Vezina Trophy nomination as the league's best goaltender and finished third in voting, losing to Patrick Roy of the Montreal Canadiens. In 1989–90, McLean appeared in his first NHL All-Star Game in Pittsburgh and was the top goaltender at the Skills Competition by allowing the fewest goals against for the Breakaway Relay and Rapid Fire events. He led the league in games and minutes played with 63 and 3,738, respectively. McLean also set Canucks records with 1,797 shots against and 1,581 saves (both marks have since been surpassed). (Note: McLean's record 1,797 shots against was surpassed by Alex Auld's 1,938 in 2005–06. McLean bettered his 1,581 saves to 1,604 in 1991–92, which was later surpassed by Auld's 1,749 in 2005–06.) Backstopping the Canucks to 21 wins, 33 losses and 10 ties, he won his first Cyclone Taylor Trophy as Canucks MVP and second Molson Cup.

Early in the 1990–91 season, McLean re-signed with the Canucks to a one-year contract with a second year option on October 16, 1990. He was set to make $145,000 prior to re-organizing his contract for the season. McLean struggled in his fourth year with the Canucks, however, recording a career-worst 3.99 GAA with a 10–22–3 record in 41 games.

McLean bounced back the following season in 1991–92, starting the season with five consecutive wins to be named league player of the week for October 3 to 13, 1991. He set an NHL record for wins in October with nine (McLean's mark was matched by the Toronto Maple Leafs' Felix Potvin and Philadelphia Flyers' Dominic Roussel in October 1993 and surpassed by the Detroit Red Wings' Manny Legace's 10 wins in October 2005); he was named player of the month. Another season and historic highlight for McLean occurred at the Montreal Forum on December 4 when he stopped 45 shots in a 3–0 win, not only earning him his third shutout of the season but also the Canucks first shutout against the Montreal Canadiens in franchise history; the performance garnered a standing ovation from Canadiens' fans in attendance. McLean went on to lead the league with five shutouts (tied with the Chicago Blackhawks' Ed Belfour, the Canadiens' Patrick Roy and the Winnipeg Jets' Bob Essensa) and 38 wins in 65 games (tied with the Red Wings' Tim Cheveldae), as Vancouver won their first Smythe Division title since 1975. He appeared in his second All-Star Game, won his second Cyclone Taylor Trophy and was named to the second All-Star team. He earned his second Vezina Trophy nomination, finishing second in voting as Roy won the award once more. He recorded personal bests with a 2.74 GAA and 38 wins, the latter of which set a Canucks single-season goaltending record (the mark stood for 15 years before Roberto Luongo recorded 47 wins in 2006–07). In the subsequent 1992 playoffs, McLean recorded his first post-season shutout by stopping 33 shots in a 5–0 win against the Winnipeg Jets in game seven of the opening round. The win eliminated the Jets after the Canucks overcame a 3–1 series deficit.

McLean appeared in 54 games in 1992–93, posting a 28–21–3 record. He recorded three shutouts, which included back-to-back blankings in January 1993. Playing against the Los Angeles Kings in the second round of the 1993 playoffs, McLean recorded his 15th playoff win in a 7–2 game four victory, establishing himself as the winningest playoff goaltender in Canucks history. The Canucks were, however, eliminated in six games by Los Angeles, the eventual Western Conference champions.

Towards the end of the 1993–94 season, McLean became a part of hockey history in a game against the Los Angeles Kings on March 23, 1994, by allowing Wayne Gretzky's 802nd career NHL goal. The goal broke Gordie Howe's record of 801, making Gretzky the all-time leading goal-scorer in NHL history. Despite allowing the historic goal, the Canucks won the game 6–3. McLean finished the season with a losing 23–26–3 record, as the Canucks finished with the seventh seed in the Western Conference.

McLean's peak with the Canucks came during the subsequent 1994 Stanley Cup playoffs, when he backstopped them to the seventh game of the Stanley Cup Final. Facing the Calgary Flames in the opening round, he made one of the most memorable plays in Canucks and NHL playoff history – a series saving stop on Flames forward Robert Reichel during the first overtime of the seventh game. Reichel had one-timed a pass from Theoren Fleury on a 3-on-1 when McLean threw out both his pads to make the stop and preserve the series. With McLean out of position and Reichel having had an open net to shoot at, the red light even came on at the Olympic Saddledome to signal a goal. The following overtime, Bure scored to eliminate the Flames and advance the Canucks to the second round.

Vancouver defeated the Dallas Stars the following round to advance to the semi-finals against the Toronto Maple Leafs. McLean posted back-to-back shutouts against the Leafs in the third and fourth games to tie the NHL playoff record of four shutouts in a single year (the New York Rangers' Mike Richter also recorded four that year; they became the seventh and eighth goaltenders to tie the record. Five more goaltenders went on to record four shutouts until the Red Wings' Dominik Hašek broke the record with six in 2002). He also became the first goaltender to record back-to-back shutouts in the semifinals since the Red Wings' Terry Sawchuk did so against the Maple Leafs in 1952. McLean's shutout streak lasted a total of 143 minutes and 17 seconds.

The Canucks went on to capture the Clarence S. Campbell Bowl as Western Conference champions to meet the New York Rangers in the Finals. McLean opened the series with a 52-save performance, including 17 in overtime, to win the first game 3–2. It was the most saves by a Canucks goaltender in a playoff game until Luongo made 72 stops in 2007. Canucks head coach Pat Quinn commented after the game that McLean's performance should be sent "in an instructional package...to young goaltender[s]." Although the Canucks managed to force a game seven after falling 3–1 in the series, they eventually lost the Stanley Cup to the Rangers by a 3–2 score in the final game. McLean finished the 1994 playoffs with a 15–9 record, a 2.29 GAA and .928 save percentage. His 1,544 minutes played, 820 shots against and 761 saves all set playoff records (they have since been surpassed). (Note: McLean's 1,544 minutes played surpassed Flyers goaltender Ron Hextall's 1,540 in 1987. It was later tied by the Dallas Stars' Ed Belfour in 1999, then surpassed by the Calgary Flames goaltender Miikka Kiprusoff's 1,595 minutes played in 2004. McLean's 820 shots against surpassed Hextall's mark of 769 in 1987 and was broken by Boston Bruins goaltender Tim Thomas' mark of 849 in 2011. McLean's record 761 saves surpassed Hextall's 698 saves in 1987 and was broken by Thomas' 798 saves in 2011.)

==== Post-lockout to trade (1994–97) ====
The following lockout-shortened 1994–95 season, McLean appeared in 40 of the Canucks' 48 games and recorded all 18 wins for the team. Winning his third and final Molson Cup, he posted a career-high .904 save percentage along with a 2.75 GAA. Before the season ended, McLean signed a five-year contract extension that included the 1994–95 season, worth an approximate $2.4 million per season, on April 5, 1995. Vancouver failed to defend their Western Conference title of the previous year's playoffs, however, as the Chicago Blackhawks swept them in the second round.

McLean's play began to slip in 1995–96 as his GAA inflated to 3.54 and he recorded a losing 15–21–9 record. He was sidelined for six weeks during the season, beginning in January 1996, due to a cartilage tear in his left knee that required arthroscopic surgery. Rookie Corey Hirsch, who began the season as McLean's backup, in comparison recorded a 2.93 GAA and a 17–14–6 record. McLean was chosen to start in the opening series against the top-seeded Colorado Avalanche, but was pulled in favour of Hirsch during game one after allowing three goals on 12 shots. The game marked McLean's final playoff appearance of his career as Hirsch played the remaining five games. The Avalanche eliminated Vancouver in six games and went on to win the Stanley Cup.

McLean reinjured his knee during the 1996–97 season during a game against the Dallas Stars on November 11, 1996. He missed approximately a month after undergoing his second arthroscopic surgery of the year in mid-November 1996. McLean and Hirsch continued to share starts in 1996–97, as McLean appeared in 44 games with a 21–18–3 record and 3.21 GAA.

=== Post-Vancouver (1998–2001) ===
McLean's tenure with the Canucks ended during the season in 1997–98. Pat Quinn was dismissed as general manager early in the campaign and was replaced by a four-man committee of team executives. On the recommendation of newly hired head coach Mike Keenan, the management team dealt McLean to the Carolina Hurricanes on January 3, 1998. He was sent in a trade, along with winger Martin Gélinas, in exchange for goaltender Sean Burke, winger Geoff Sanderson and defenceman Enrico Ciccone.

After ten-and-a-half seasons in Vancouver, McLean left as the franchise's all-time leader in regular season games played (516), wins (211) and shutouts (20), as well as playoff games played (68), wins (34) and shutouts (6). (Luongo surpassed McLean's regular season shutouts total with his 21st on October 26, 2009.) McLean's departure marked the beginning of an unstable period of time for Canucks goaltending. In the seven-and-a-half seasons between the time McLean was traded away and Luongo was acquired by the Canucks, a total of 18 goaltenders played for the club. General manager Brian Burke, who succeeded the four-man committee, coined the term "goalie graveyard" during his time in Vancouver to describe the club's goaltending fortunes.

McLean entered his first game with the Hurricanes with the NHL's worst GAA at 3.68, but helped his new club to a 4–1 win to record his first victory with Carolina. His tenure in Carolina was brief, as the Hurricanes traded him after eight appearances to the Florida Panthers for forward Ray Sheppard on March 24, 1998. He made his debut with the Panthers two days later on March 26 and recorded a 5–4 win against the Canadiens. The following season, McLean recorded his first shutout with the Panthers in a 1–0 win against the Nashville Predators. He went on to match his personal best 2.74 GAA in his first and only full season with the Panthers in 1998–99, playing in 30 games as Sean Burke's backup.

The following off-season, he signed a two-year deal, worth an approximate $1.64 million with bonus incentives for games played, as an unrestricted free agent with the New York Rangers on July 13, 1999. McLean was brought in to replace Dan Cloutier, who had been traded away, as Mike Richter's backup. McLean was forced to switch his number upon joining the club, as his customary number 1 was retired in honor of Ed Giacomin, he opted to wear number 30. McLean was thrust into the starter's role in the first month of the 1999–2000 season, as Richter was sidelined with back problems early He made his Rangers debut in the season opener, making 25 saves in a 2–1 loss on October 5, 1999. He completed the season with a 2.89 GAA in 22 games. The following campaign in 2000–01, McLean's GAA rose to 3.49 GAA in 23 games. After two seasons in New York and 17 seasons in the NHL overall, McLean retired in 2001.

== International play ==
Over the course of his career, McLean represented Canada in international competition once. On March 28, 1990, McLean was among the players named to Canada's roster for the 1990 World Championships in Bern and Fribourg, Switzerland. McLean was given the role of starting goaltender, with Ken Wregget serving as his backup. Canada won its first four-round robin games with McLean in net, including an 8–0 shutout victory versus Norway in which McLean split goaltending duties with Wregget, thus clinching a spot in the medal round. As the round robin continued, Canada added to their perfect record with a 5–3 victory over Czechoslovakia in which McLean stopped 25 of 28 shots for the victory. McLean started Canada's next game, a 3–1 victory versus Sweden, but was replaced in the second period by third string goaltender Bob Essensa who had yet to play in the tournament. Following a 3–3 tie with the Soviet Union, Canada clinched first place in the round robin. The game was one of McLean's best of the tournament, as he managed to keep the Soviet Union at bay during the third period in which they had a 14–2 margin in shots on goal.

After suffering a 3–2 loss versus Czechoslovakia in the opening game of the medal round, Canada opted to start Essensa versus the Soviet Union. Essensa let in four early goals before being replaced by McLean, who let in another three in a 7–1 loss to move Canada out of contention for the gold medal. In the final game of the tournament versus Sweden, Canada suffered a 6–4 loss and finished fourth overall for the tournament, missing out on their opportunity for a bronze medal that would have come with a win versus Sweden.

== Post-playing career ==
Following McLean's retirement, he was hired as a goaltending coach for the Kamloops Blazers of the WHL. He served in that capacity for one season, in 2002–03. McLean also returned to the Canucks organization as a broadcaster for the team's pay-per-view telecasts.

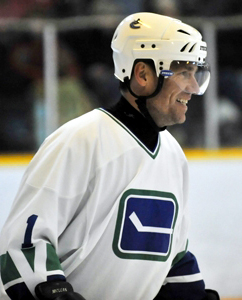
McLean with the Vancouver Canucks alumni in 2009

McLean has also pursued the restaurant business in Vancouver, British Columbia. He co-owns McLean's restaurant (opened June 24, 2010), the result of buying out other owners of So.cial at Le Magasin, a restaurant in the Gastown neighbourhood that opened in April 2007, with his former Canucks head coach, Bob McCammon. McLean is also a part-owner in the Coquitlam Express, a Junior A team in the BCHL. The ownership group includes several other former NHLers, including Darcy Rota, Bill Ranford and Dave Lowry.

From Sept 3, 2010, to May 14, 2013, McLean served as Colorado Avalanche's goaltending consultant;. During the 2010–11 season, McLean was honoured by the Canucks in a ceremony prior to a game against the Avalanche on November 25, 2010. The organization made him the second inductee of the Canucks' Ring of Honour, commemorating the team's best players of all-time with plaques circling the Rogers Arena stands. McLean was named to British Columbia's Hockey Hall of Fame on January 22, 2014.

== Personal life ==
Following his retirement, McLean moved back to Vancouver, where he joined the Canucks' alumni squad. The group is active in the local community, participating in fundraisers and working alongside Hockey Canada and BC Hockey for minor hockey associations. In September 2011, his off-ice efforts as a member of the Canucks' alumni were recognized and he was presented the Jake Milford Award.

McLean has pursued various interests besides hockey during and after his playing career. An avid golfer, he is part of the Marine Drive Golf Club in Vancouver and the Nicklaus North Golf Club in Whistler. He was also accepted into the Royal Portrush Golf Club in Northern Ireland in 2008. McLean began playing regularly at the age of 10.

Involved in thoroughbred horse racing, he co-owned Regal Discovery, a colt who won the 136th Queen's Plate in 1995, with his wife Lesley and her parents Anne and Ron. McLean and Lesley have since divorced. In 1998, he was also briefly married to Canadian journalist Jane MacDougall, a columnist for the National Post newspaper. As of 2020 he is married to ex-model and media account consultant Genevieve Duford, living together in Vancouver.

== Career statistics ==
=== Regular season and playoffs ===
			Regular season									Playoffs
Season	Team	League	GP	W	L	T	MIN	GA	SO	GAA	SV%	GP	W	L	MIN	GA	SO	GAA	SV%
1982–83	Don Mills Flyers	MTHL	26	—	—	—	1575	52	0	2.01	—	—	—	—	—	—	—	—	—
1983–84	Oshawa Generals	OHL	17	5	9	0	940	67	0	4.28	—	—	—	—	—	—	—	—	—
1984–85	Oshawa Generals	OHL	47	23	17	2	2,581	143	1	3.32	—	5	1	3	271	21	0	4.65	—
1985–86	Oshawa Generals	OHL	51	24	21	2	2,380	169	1	3.58	—	4	1	2	201	18	0	5.37	—
1985–86	New Jersey Devils	NHL	2	1	1	0	111	11	0	5.95	.814	—	—	—	—	—	—	—	—
1986–87	Maine Mariners	AHL	45	15	23	4	2,606	140	1	3.22	.894	—	—	—	—	—	—	—	—
1986–87	New Jersey Devils	NHL	4	1	1	0	160	10	0	3.75	.863	—	—	—	—	—	—	—	—
1987–88	Vancouver Canucks	NHL	41	11	27	3	2,380	147	1	3.71	.875	—	—	—	—	—	—	—	—
1988–89	Vancouver Canucks	NHL	42	20	17	3	2,477	127	4	3.08	.891	5	2	3	302	18	0	3.57	.892
1989–90	Vancouver Canucks	NHL	63	21	30	10	3,739	216	0	3.47	.880	—	—	—	—	—	—	—	—
1990–91	Vancouver Canucks	NHL	41	10	22	3	1,969	131	0	3.99	.867	2	1	1	123	7	0	3.41	.894
1991–92	Vancouver Canucks	NHL	65	38	17	9	3,852	176	5	2.74	.901	13	6	7	785	33	2	2.54	.909
1992–93	Vancouver Canucks	NHL	54	28	21	5	3,261	184	3	3.39	.886	12	6	6	754	42	0	3.34	.886
1993–94	Vancouver Canucks	NHL	52	23	26	3	3,128	156	3	2.99	.891	24	15	9	1,544	59	4	2.29	.928
1994–95	Vancouver Canucks	NHL	40	18	12	10	2,374	109	1	2.75	.904	11	4	7	660	21	0	3.27	.893
1995–96	Vancouver Canucks	NHL	45	15	21	9	2,644	156	2	3.54	.879	1	0	1	21	3	0	8.57	.750
1996–97	Vancouver Canucks	NHL	44	21	18	3	2,581	138	0	3.21	.889	—	—	—	—	—	—	—	—
1997–98	Vancouver Canucks	NHL	29	6	17	4	1,583	97	1	3.68	.879	—	—	—	—	—	—	—	—
1997–98	Carolina Hurricanes	NHL	8	4	2	0	401	20	0	2.99	.889	—	—	—	—	—	—	—	—
1997–98	Florida Panthers	NHL	7	4	2	1	406	22	0	3.25	.894	—	—	—	—	—	—	—	—
1998–99	Florida Panthers	NHL	30	9	10	4	1,597	73	2	2.74	.900	—	—	—	—	—	—	—	—
1999–00	New York Rangers	NHL	22	7	8	4	1,206	58	0	2.89	.896	—	—	—	—	—	—	—	—
2000–01	New York Rangers	NHL	23	8	10	1	1,220	71	0	3.49	.889	—	—	—	—	—	—	—	—
NHL totals			612	245	262	72	35,090	1,904	22	3.26	.887	68	34	34	4,188	198	6	2.84	.907

=== International ===
Year	Team	Event	GP	W	L	T	MIN	GA	SO	GAA	SV%
1990	Canada	WC	10	4	3	1	457	27	0	3.54	—
International totals			10	4	3	1	457	27	0	3.54	—

=== All-Star Games ===
Year	Location	Decision	MIN	GA	GAA
1990	Pittsburgh	—	30:46	4	7.80
1992	Philadelphia	—	20:00	3	9.00
All-Star totals		0–0–0	50:46	7	8.27

== Awards ==
=== NHL ===
Award	Year(s)
NHL All-Star Game	1990, 1992
Second All-Star team	1992
Sporting News second All-Star team	1992

=== Vancouver Canucks ===
Award	Year(s)
Molson Cup (most three-star selections)	1988, 1990, 1995
Cyclone Taylor Trophy (team MVP)	1990, 1992
Ring of Honour	2010
Jake Milford Award	2011

== Vancouver Canucks records ==
=== All-time ===
- Regular season games played, goaltender - 516
- Regular season wins, goaltender Luongo – 224 (after end of 2011–2012 season; surpassed Kirk McLean, 211)- 211
- Regular season losses, goaltender – 228
- Playoff games played, goaltender - 68
- Playoff wins, goaltender - 34
- Playoff losses, goaltender – 34
- Playoff shutouts - 6

=== Single-season ===
- Playoff wins – 15 (1994)
- Playoff shutouts – 4 (1994) (tied with Roberto Luongo, 2011)
- Playoff shots against – 820 (1994)
- Playoff saves – 761 (1994)
- Playoff minutes played – 1,543 (1994)

== Transactions ==
- June 9, 1984 – Drafted in the sixth round, 107th overall by the New Jersey Devils in the 1984 NHL entry draft.
- September 15, 1987 – Traded by the New Jersey Devils with Greg Adams and the Devils' second round selection (Leif Rohlin) in the 1988 NHL entry draft to the Vancouver Canucks for Patrik Sundstrom, the Canucks' second round selection (Jeff Christian) in the 1988 NHL Entry Draft, and the Canucks' fourth round selection (Matt Ruchty) in the 1988 NHL Entry Draft.
- January 3, 1998 – Traded by the Vancouver Canucks with Martin Gélinas to the Carolina Hurricanes for Sean Burke, Enrico Ciccone, and Geoff Sanderson.
- March 24, 1998 – Traded by the Carolina Hurricanes to the Florida Panthers for Ray Sheppard.
- July 13, 1999 – Signed as an unrestricted free agent by the New York Rangers.
