= Greg Adams (ice hockey, born 1963) =

Canadian ice hockey player (born 1963)

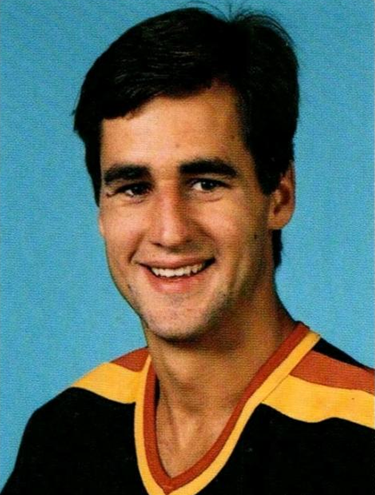
- Born: August 15, 1963 (age 62) Nelson, British Columbia, Canada
- Height: 6 ft 2 in (188 cm)
- Weight: 185 lb (84 kg; 13 st 3 lb)
- Position: Left wing
- Shot: Left
- Played for: New Jersey Devils; Vancouver Canucks; Dallas Stars; Phoenix Coyotes; Florida Panthers; Frankfurt Lions
- National team: Canada
- NHL draft: Undrafted
- Playing career: 1984–2002

Gregory Daren “Gus” Adams (born August 15, 1963) is a Canadian former ice hockey winger who played in the National Hockey League (NHL) from 1984 to 2001.

== Playing career ==
Before turning pro, Adams played two seasons ('82–83 and '83–84) at Northern Arizona University for the men's ice hockey team. He led the nation in scoring his sophomore season. Undrafted, he was then signed by the New Jersey Devils on June 24, 1984. He played three seasons with the Devils until he was traded to the Vancouver Canucks on September 15, 1987, along with Kirk McLean for Patrik Sundstrom and a fourth round pick in the 1988 NHL entry draft (Matt Ruchty). The following season, when Greg C. Adams was traded to Vancouver, the younger Greg Adams became identified by the nickname Greg "Gus" Adams.

Adams would go on to play eight seasons in Vancouver. During the 1994 Stanley Cup Playoffs, Adams scored a goal in what many Canucks fans believe to be one of the greatest moments in team history. In Game 5 of the Western Conference Finals against the Toronto Maple Leafs, Adams scored the game-winning goal in overtime, catapulting the team to their second-ever Stanley Cup Finals berth. He would also score the overtime winner in Game 1 of that Stanley Cup Finals against the New York Rangers.

Adams was traded to the Dallas Stars in the 1994–95 season. After four seasons in Dallas, he moved on to play for the Phoenix Coyotes for two seasons (1998–99 and 1999–2000). After Phoenix, Adams played one season (2000–01) with the Florida Panthers and then retired from the NHL.

Adams was a decent goal scorer who managed to score more than 30 goals four times in his career and had nine seasons with more than 20. Twice he scored over 70 points, once with the Devils (77) and once with the Canucks (76). Unfortunately, Adams was often plagued with the injury bug and only once managed to play one full season.

== Career statistics ==
=== Regular season and playoffs ===
			Regular season					Playoffs
Season	Team	League	GP	G	A	Pts	PIM	GP	G	A	Pts	PIM
1979–80	Nelson Leafs	KIJHL	—	—	—	—	—	—	—	—	—	—
1980–81	Kelowna Buckaroos	BCHL	48	40	50	90	16	—	—	—	—	—
1981–82	Kelowna Buckaroos	BCHL	45	31	42	73	24	—	—	—	—	—
1982–83	Northern Arizona University	NCAA	29	14	21	35	19	—	—	—	—	—
1983–84	Northern Arizona University	NCAA	26	44	29	73	24	—	—	—	—	—
1984–85	New Jersey Devils	NHL	36	12	9	21	14	—	—	—	—	—
1984–85	Maine Mariners	AHL	41	15	20	35	12	11	3	4	7	0
1985–86	New Jersey Devils	NHL	78	35	42	77	30	—	—	—	—	—
1986–87	New Jersey Devils	NHL	72	20	27	47	19	—	—	—	—	—
1987–88	Vancouver Canucks	NHL	80	36	40	76	30	—	—	—	—	—
1988–89	Vancouver Canucks	NHL	61	19	14	33	24	7	2	3	5	2
1989–90	Vancouver Canucks	NHL	65	30	20	50	18	—	—	—	—	—
1990–91	Vancouver Canucks	NHL	55	21	24	45	10	5	0	0	0	2
1991–92	Vancouver Canucks	NHL	76	30	27	57	26	6	0	2	2	4
1992–93	Vancouver Canucks	NHL	53	25	31	56	14	12	7	6	13	6
1993–94	Vancouver Canucks	NHL	68	13	24	37	20	23	6	8	14	2
1994–95	Vancouver Canucks	NHL	31	5	10	15	12	—	—	—	—	—
1994–95	Dallas Stars	NHL	12	3	3	6	4	5	2	0	2	0
1995–96	Dallas Stars	NHL	66	22	21	43	33	—	—	—	—	—
1996–97	Dallas Stars	NHL	50	21	15	36	2	3	0	1	1	0
1997–98	Dallas Stars	NHL	49	14	18	32	20	12	2	2	4	0
1998–99	Phoenix Coyotes	NHL	75	19	24	43	26	3	1	0	1	0
1999–00	Phoenix Coyotes	NHL	69	19	27	46	14	5	0	0	0	0
2000–01	Florida Panthers	NHL	60	11	12	23	10	—	—	—	—	—
2002–03	Frankfurt Lions	DEL	50	18	24	42	88	—	—	—	—	—
NHL totals			1,056	355	388	743	326	81	20	22	42	16

=== International ===
Year	Team	Event	Result	GP	G	A	Pts	PIM
1986	Canada	WC	3rd place, bronze medalist(s)	1	1	0	1	0
1990	Canada	WC	4th	10	8	1	9	10
Senior totals				11	9	1	10	10

== See also ==
- List of NHL players with 1,000 games played
