= German Titov (ice hockey) =

Russian ice hockey player

- Born: October 16, 1965 (age 60) Borovsk, Russian SFSR, Soviet Union
- Height: 5 ft 11 in (180 cm)
- Weight: 176 lb (80 kg; 12 st 8 lb)
- Position: Left wing
- Shot: Left
- Played for: Khimik Voskresensk; TPS; Calgary Flames; Pittsburgh Penguins; Edmonton Oilers; Mighty Ducks of Anaheim
- National team: Russia
- NHL draft: 252nd overall, 1993; Calgary Flames
- Playing career: 1982–2005

Olympic medal record

Representing Russia

Men's Ice hockey
Silver medal – second place	1998 Nagano	Team

German Mikhailovich Titov (Russian: Герман Михайлович Титов; born October 16, 1965) is a Russian former professional ice hockey forward.

== Playing career ==
Titov started his career with Khimik Voskresensk of the Soviet Hockey League. He remained with the team until 1992 when he spent one season in Finland's SM-liiga for TPS, where he scored 25 goals in 47 games.

At 27, Titov was drafted 252nd overall by the Calgary Flames in the 1993 NHL entry draft and made his NHL debut with the Flames in the 1993–94 season. The 1995–96 season was Titov's best NHL season, scoring 28 goals and 37 assists for 67 points. In 1998, Titov was traded to the Pittsburgh Penguins but was unable to match the same goal-scoring production he achieved at Calgary. He was later traded to the Edmonton Oilers in March 2000 but scored no goals in seven games. He then signed with the Mighty Ducks of Anaheim and stayed for two seasons but his scoring production dropped further.

He left the NHL after the 2001–02 season and after sitting out a year, he went back to the team he had played for before coming to the NHL, Khimik Voskresensk. He played there until his retirement in 2005.

Titov also played for the Russian national team, winning a gold medal in the 1993 Ice Hockey World Championship and a silver medal in the 1998 Winter Olympics in Nagano, Japan.

== Coaching career ==
In the 2014–15 season, he was the head coach of Metallurg Novokuznetsk in the Kontinental Hockey League. In the 2015–16 season (until October 2016), he was the head coach for Spartak Moscow.

== Career statistics ==
=== Regular season and playoffs ===
			Regular season					Playoffs
Season	Team	League	GP	G	A	Pts	PIM	GP	G	A	Pts	PIM
1982–83	Khimik Voskresensk	Soviet	16	0	4	4	2	—	—	—	—	—
1986–87	Khimik Voskresensk	Soviet	23	1	0	1	10	—	—	—	—	—
1987–88	Khimik Voskresensk	Soviet	39	6	5	11	10	—	—	—	—	—
1988–89	Khimik Voskresensk	Soviet	44	10	3	13	24	—	—	—	—	—
1989–90	Khimik Voskresensk	Soviet	44	6	14	20	19	—	—	—	—	—
1990–91	Khimik Voskresensk	Soviet	45	13	11	24	28	—	—	—	—	—
1991–92	Khimik Voskresensk	Soviet	35	16	11	27	31	7	4	1	5	4
1992–93	TPS	SM-l	47	25	19	44	49	12	5	12	17	10
1993–94	Calgary Flames	NHL	76	27	18	45	28	7	2	1	3	4
1994–95	TPS	SM-l	14	6	6	12	20	—	—	—	—	—
1994–95	Calgary Flames	NHL	40	12	12	24	16	7	5	3	8	10
1995–96	Calgary Flames	NHL	82	28	39	67	24	4	0	2	2	0
1996–97	Calgary Flames	NHL	79	22	30	52	36	—	—	—	—	—
1997–98	Calgary Flames	NHL	68	18	22	40	38	—	—	—	—	—
1998–99	Pittsburgh Penguins	NHL	72	11	45	56	34	11	3	5	8	4
1999–2000	Pittsburgh Penguins	NHL	63	17	25	42	34	—	—	—	—	—
1999–2000	Edmonton Oilers	NHL	7	0	4	4	4	5	1	1	2	0
2000–01	Mighty Ducks of Anaheim	NHL	71	9	11	20	61	—	—	—	—	—
2001–02	Mighty Ducks of Anaheim	NHL	66	13	14	27	36	—	—	—	—	—
2003–04	Khimik Voskresensk	RSL	38	5	13	18	67	—	—	—	—	—
2004–05	Khimik Voskresensk	RSL	50	7	22	29	56	—	—	—	—	—
Soviet totals			246	52	48	100	124	7	4	1	5	4
NHL totals			624	157	220	377	311	34	11	12	23	18

=== International ===
Year	Team	Event	Result	GP	G	A	Pts	PIM
1993	Russia	WC	1st place, gold medalist(s)	8	4	2	6	0
1998	Russia	OG	2nd place, silver medalist(s)	6	1	0	1	6
Senior totals				14	5	2	7	6
