= Ray Sheppard =

Canadian ice hockey player

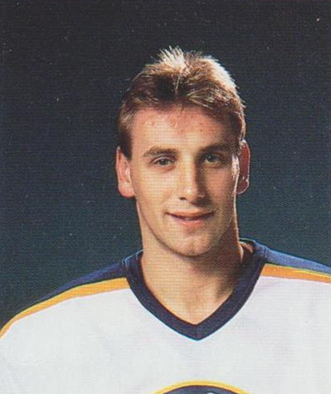
- Sheppard with the Buffalo Sabres in 1988
- Born: May 27, 1966 (age 60) Pembroke, Ontario, Canada
- Height: 6 ft 1 in (185 cm)
- Weight: 195 lb (88 kg; 13 st 13 lb)
- Position: Right wing
- Shot: Right
- Played for: Buffalo Sabres; New York Rangers; Detroit Red Wings; San Jose Sharks; Florida Panthers; Carolina Hurricanes; SC Langnau
- NHL draft: 60th overall, 1984; Buffalo Sabres
- Playing career: 1986–2001

Raymond Garfield Sheppard (born May 27, 1966) is a Canadian former professional ice hockey right winger who played in the National Hockey League (NHL) from 1987 to 2000. Sheppard was born in Pembroke, Ontario, but grew up in Petawawa, Ontario.

== Playing career ==
Sheppard was selected 60th overall by the Buffalo Sabres in the 1984 NHL entry draft. He played 817 career NHL games, scoring 357 goals and 300 assists for 657 points. His best season statistically was the 1993–94 season when he scored 52 goals and 93 points for the Detroit Red Wings. He also played for the New York Rangers, San Jose Sharks, Florida Panthers, and the Carolina Hurricanes. On March 21, 1996, Sheppard scored the first home ice hat trick in Panthers franchise history.

He achieved a rare feat during his career, scoring at least twenty goals in a season for six different NHL teams (accomplishing it in 1999). This was a record of until Bill Guerin passed him by scoring twenty goals with seven teams.

Sheppard has been named the second-best golfer amongst athletes (of sports other than golf) by Golf Digest. He currently serves on the board of directors for the Panthers Alumni Association.

== Career statistics ==
			Regular season					Playoffs
Season	Team	League	GP	G	A	Pts	PIM	GP	G	A	Pts	PIM
1982–83	Brockville Braves	CJHL	48	27	36	63	81	—	—	—	—	—
1983–84	Cornwall Royals	OHL	68	44	36	80	69	3	2	4	6	0
1984–85	Cornwall Royals	OHL	49	25	33	58	51	9	2	12	14	4
1985–86	Cornwall Royals	OHL	63	81	61	142	25	6	7	4	11	0
1986–87	Rochester Americans	AHL	55	18	13	31	11	15	12	3	15	2
1987–88	Buffalo Sabres	NHL	74	38	27	65	14	6	1	1	2	2
1988–89	Buffalo Sabres	NHL	67	22	21	43	15	1	0	1	1	0
1989–90	Rochester Americans	AHL	5	3	5	8	2	17	8	7	15	9
1989–90	Buffalo Sabres	NHL	18	4	2	6	0	—	—	—	—	—
1990–91	New York Rangers	NHL	59	24	23	47	21	—	—	—	—	—
1991–92	Detroit Red Wings	NHL	74	36	26	62	27	11	6	2	8	4
1992–93	Detroit Red Wings	NHL	70	32	34	66	29	7	2	3	5	0
1993–94	Detroit Red Wings	NHL	82	52	41	93	26	7	2	1	3	4
1994–95	Detroit Red Wings	NHL	43	30	10	40	17	17	4	3	7	5
1995–96	Detroit Red Wings	NHL	5	2	2	4	2	—	—	—	—	—
1995–96	San Jose Sharks	NHL	51	27	19	46	10	—	—	—	—	—
1995–96	Florida Panthers	NHL	14	8	2	10	4	21	8	8	16	0
1996–97	Florida Panthers	NHL	68	29	31	60	4	5	2	0	2	0
1997–98	Florida Panthers	NHL	61	14	17	31	21	—	—	—	—	—
1997–98	Carolina Hurricanes	NHL	10	4	2	6	2	—	—	—	—	—
1998–99	Carolina Hurricanes	NHL	74	25	33	58	16	6	5	1	6	2
1999–2000	Florida Panthers	NHL	47	10	10	20	4	—	—	—	—	—
2000–01	SC Langnau	NLA	13	13	4	17	0	—	—	—	—	—
NHL totals			817	357	300	657	212	81	30	20	50	17

== Awards and honours ==
Award	Year
OHL
First All-Star Team	1986
Red Tilson Trophy	1986
Eddie Powers Memorial Trophy	1986
Jim Mahon Memorial Trophy	1986
AHL
Calder Cup (Rochester Americans)	1987
NHL
All-Rookie Team	1988

== Transactions ==
- Drafted by the Buffalo Sabres in the 1984 NHL entry draft in the third round as the 60th overall pick.
- Acquired by the New York Rangers for US$1 from the Buffalo Sabres in 1990.
- August 5, 1991 - Signed as an unrestricted free agent with the Detroit Red Wings.
- October 24, 1995 - Traded by the Detroit Red Wings to the San Jose Sharks for Igor Larionov and a conditional 1998 draft pick.
- March 16, 1996 - Traded by the San Jose Sharks, along with a fourth round pick in 1996, to the Florida Panthers for 2nd and fourth round picks in 1996.
- March 24, 1998 - Traded at the deadline by the Florida Panthers to the Carolina Hurricanes for Kirk McLean.
- November 15, 1999 - Signed as an unrestricted free agent with the Florida Panthers.
- Announced retirement at the end of 1999–2000 NHL season.
