= Matt Ruchty =

Canadian ice hockey player

Matthew Ruchty
- Born: November 27, 1969 (age 56) Kitchener, Ontario, Canada
- Height: 6 ft 1 in (185 cm)
- Weight: 225 lb (102 kg; 16 st 1 lb)
- Position: Left wing
- Played for: AHL; Utica Devils; Albany River Rats; Syracuse Crunch; Rochester Americans; Providence Bruins; IHL; Atlanta Knights; Grand Rapids Griffins; CoHL; Utica Blizzard; WCHL; Anchorage Aces; UHL; B.C. Icemen; Muskegon Fury; ECHL; Toledo Storm
- NHL draft: 65th overall, 1988; New Jersey Devils
- Playing career: 1991–2003

Matthew Ruchty (born November 27, 1969) is a Canadian former professional ice hockey left winger. He was drafted by the New Jersey Devils, 65th overall in 1988, but only played two exhibition games in the National Hockey League (NHL). Ruchty was a career minor-leaguer, playing in the American Hockey League (AHL), International Hockey League (IHL), Continental Hockey League (CoHL), West Coast Hockey League (WCHL), United Hockey League (UHL) and ECHL. Although best known for his toughness and accumulation of penalty minutes, as well as his love for The Beatles, Ruchty proved to be an integral part of the Calder Cup-winning Albany River Rats during the 94-95 season, scoring a career-high 49 points in 78 regular season games and notching an additional 15 points in 12 playoff contests.
