= 1984–85 NHL transactions =

The following is a list of all team-to-team transactions that have occurred in the National Hockey League during the 1984–85 NHL season. It lists what team each player has been traded to, signed by, or claimed by, and for which player(s) or draft pick(s), if applicable.

== Trades between teams ==
=== May ===
May 23, 1984	To Detroit Red Wings Rob McClanahan	To New York Rangers future considerations
May 24, 1984	To Boston Bruins 10th-rd pick - 1985 entry draft (# 210 - Bob Beers)	To Philadelphia Flyers Ian Armstrong
May 29, 1984	To Hartford Whalers Brad Shaw	To Detroit Red Wings 8th-rd pick - 1984 entry draft (# 152 - Lars Karlsson)

=== June ===
June 9, 1984	To Los Angeles Kings Bob Janecyk; 1st-rd pick - 1984 entry draft (# 6 - Craig Redmond); 3rd-rd pick - 1984 entry draft (# 48 - John English); 4th-rd pick - 1984 entry draft (# 69 - Tom Glavine)	To Chicago Black Hawks 1st-rd pick - 1984 entry draft (# 3 - Eddie Olczyk); 4th-rd pick - 1984 entry draft (# 66 -Tommy Eriksson)
June 9, 1984	To Montreal Canadiens 1st-rd pick - 1984 entry draft (# 8 - Shayne Corson); 2nd-rd pick - 1984 entry draft (# 29 - Stephane Richer)	To St. Louis Blues Rick Wamsley; 2nd-rd pick - 1984 entry draft (# 26 - Brian Benning); 2nd-rd pick - 1984 entry draft (# 152 - Tony Hrkac); 3rd-rd pick - 1984 entry draft (# 53 - Robert Dirk)
June 13, 1984	To Montreal Canadiens Lucien DeBlois	To Winnipeg Jets Perry Turnbull
June 19, 1984	To New Jersey Devils Don Dietrich; Rich Preston; 2nd-rd pick - 1985 entry draft (# 32 - Eric Weinrich)	To Chicago Black Hawks Bob MacMillan; 5th-rd pick - 1985 entry draft (# 87 - Rick Herbert)
June 21, 1984	To Boston Bruins Ken Linseman	To Edmonton Oilers Mike Krushelnyski
June 21, 1984	To Minnesota North Stars Harold Snepsts	To Vancouver Canucks Al MacAdam
June 26, 1984	To Quebec Nordiques rights to Dan Wood rights to Richard Zemlak rights to Roger Hagglund	To St. Louis Blues cash

=== August ===
August 8, 1984	To Vancouver Canucks Rob McClanahan	To Detroit Red Wings Tiger Williams
August 17, 1984	To Toronto Maple Leafs Bill Root	To Montreal Canadiens 4th-rd pick - 1986 entry draft (TOR - # 69 - Kent Hulst)^{1}
August 31, 1984	To Vancouver Canucks Dave Simpson	To New York Islanders future considerations

1. Toronto's fourth-round pick was re-acquired as the result of a trade on September 18, 1985 that sent Dominic Campedelli to Montreal in exchange for Montreal's second-round pick in 1986 entry draft and this pick.

=== September ===
September 5, 1984	To Hartford Whalers Steve Weeks	To New York Rangers future considerations^{1} (3rd-rd pick - 1986 entry draft - # 53 - Shaun Clouston)
September 20, 1984	To Minnesota North Stars Ken Solheim	To Detroit Red Wings future considerations
September 27, 1984	To New Jersey Devils Sam St. Laurent	To Philadelphia Flyers future considerations

1. Trade completed on June 21, 1986.

=== October ===
October 9, 1984	To Montreal Canadiens Doug Soetaert	To Winnipeg Jets Mark Holden
October 10, 1984	To Detroit Red Wings Darryl Sittler	To Philadelphia Flyers Murray Craven; Joe Paterson
October 15, 1984	To Boston Bruins 4th-rd pick - 1985 entry draft (QUE - # 65 - Peter Massey)^{1}	To Pittsburgh Penguins Randy Hillier
October 16, 1984	To Winnipeg Jets future considerations	To Philadelphia Flyers Tim Young
October 17, 1984	To Edmonton Oilers Rejean Cloutier	To Detroit Red Wings Todd Bidner
October 24, 1984	To Boston Bruins Charlie Simmer	To Los Angeles Kings 1st-rd pick - 1985 entry draft (# 10 - Dan Gratton)
October 24, 1984	To Boston Bruins Louis Sleigher	To Quebec Nordiques Luc Dufour; 4th-rd pick - 1985 entry draft (# 65 - Peter Massey)

1. Boston's fourth-round pick went to Quebec as the result of a trade October 25, 1984 that sent Louis Sleigher to Boston in exchange for Luc Dufour and this pick.

=== November ===
November 9, 1984	To Montreal Canadiens Ron Flockhart	To Pittsburgh Penguins John Chabot
November 16, 1984	To Hartford Whalers Pat Boutette	To Pittsburgh Penguins rights to Ville Siren
November 18, 1984	To Montreal Canadiens 10th-rd pick - 1985 entry draft (# 198 - Maurizio Mansi)	To Los Angeles Kings Steve Shutt
November 19, 1984	To Minnesota North Stars Roland Melanson	To New York Islanders 1st-rd pick in - 1985 entry draft (# 6 - Brad Dalgarno)^{1}
November 27, 1984	To Edmonton Oilers Mark Morrison	To New York Rangers cash
November 27, 1984	To Los Angeles Kings cash	To Pittsburgh Penguins Dean Hopkins

1. The Islanders had the option of the first-round pick in 1985 or 1986 Entry Draft. They selected in the 1985 draft.

=== December ===
December 6, 1984	To Buffalo Sabres Dave Maloney; Chris Renaud	To New York Rangers Steve Patrick; Jim Wiemer
December 6, 1984	To Quebec Nordiques Tom Thornbury	To Pittsburgh Penguins Brian Ford
December 14, 1984	To Minnesota North Stars Bo Berglund; Tony McKegney	To Quebec Nordiques Brent Ashton; Brad Maxwell

=== January ===
January 24, 1985	To Minnesota North Stars Terry Martin; Gord Sherven	To Edmonton Oilers Mark Napier
January 29, 1985	To Quebec Nordiques Alain Lemieux	To St. Louis Blues Luc Dufour

=== February ===
February 4, 1985	To Boston Bruins Morris Lukowich	To Winnipeg Jets Jim Nill
February 14, 1985	To Toronto Maple Leafs Larry Landon	To Montreal Canadiens Gaston Gingras
February 21, 1985	To Hartford Whalers Mike Liut; Jorgen Pettersson	To St. Louis Blues Mark Johnson; Greg Millen

=== March ===
- Trading Deadline: March 12, 1985

March 12, 1985	To Hartford Whalers Dean Evason; Peter Sidorkiewicz	To Washington Capitals David Jensen
March 12, 1985	To Los Angeles Kings Tiger Williams	To Detroit Red Wings future considerations
March 12, 1985	To Washington Capitals Mark Taylor	To Pittsburgh Penguins Jim McGeough
March 12, 1985	To Vancouver Canucks Glen Cochrane	To Philadelphia Flyers 3rd-rd pick - 1986 entry draft (VAN - # 49 - Don Gibson)^{1}

1. Vancouver's third-round pick was re-acquired as the result of a trade on June 6, 1986 that sent Jean-Jacques Daigneault, Vancouver's second-round pick in 1986 entry draft and fifth-round pick in 1987 entry draft to Philadelphia in exchange for Dave Richter, Rich Sutter and this pick.

== Additional sources ==
- hockeydb.com - search for player and select "show trades"
- "NHL trades for 1984-1985". NHL Trade Tracker.
