= Ted Bulley =

Canadian ice hockey player (born 1955)

- Born: March 25, 1955 (age 71) Windsor, Ontario, Canada
- Height: 6 ft 1 in (185 cm)
- Weight: 192 lb (87 kg; 13 st 10 lb)
- Position: Left wing
- Shot: Left
- Played for: Chicago Black Hawks; Washington Capitals; Pittsburgh Penguins
- NHL draft: 115th overall, 1975; Chicago Black Hawks
- WHA draft: 59th overall, 1975; Quebec Nordiques
- Playing career: 1975–1985

Edward Harvey Bulley (born March 25, 1955) is a Canadian former professional ice hockey player.

Drafted in 1975 by both the Chicago Black Hawks of the National Hockey League and the Quebec Nordiques of the World Hockey Association, Bulley played for the Black Hawks, Washington Capitals, and Pittsburgh Penguins. He also played one season for the Baltimore Skipjacks of the American Hockey League before retiring from active play.

In 414 NHL games, Bulley had 101 goals and 113 assists.

== Career statistics ==
			Regular Season					Playoffs
Season	Team	League	GP	G	A	Pts	PIM	GP	G	A	Pts	PIM
1972–73	Windsor Spitfires	SOJHL	16	9	10	19	10	—	—	—	—	—
1973–74	Hull Festivals	QMJHL	67	28	37	65	116	—	—	—	—	—
1974–75	Hull Festivals	QMJHL	70	48	61	109	129	4	1	2	3	9
1975–76	Flint Generals	IHL	38	15	13	28	123	4	2	0	2	9
1975–76	Dallas Black Hawks	CHL	—	—	—	—	—	7	0	1	1	4
1976–77	Chicago Blackhawks	NHL	2	0	0	0	0	—	—	—	—	—
1976–77	Dallas Black Hawks	CHL	2	2	2	4	10	—	—	—	—	—
1976–77	Flint Generals	IHL	70	46	46	92	122	2	0	0	0	0
1977–78	Chicago Blackhawks	NHL	79	23	28	51	141	4	1	1	2	2
1978–79	Chicago Blackhawks	NHL	75	27	23	50	153	2	0	0	0	0
1979–80	Chicago Blackhawks	NHL	66	14	17	31	136	7	2	3	5	10
1980–81	Chicago Blackhawks	NHL	68	18	16	34	95	—	—	—	—	—
1981–82	Chicago Blackhawks	NHL	59	12	18	30	120	15	2	1	3	12
1982–83	Washington Capitals	NHL	39	4	9	13	47	1	0	0	0	0
1983–84	Baltimore Skipjacks	AHL	49	16	19	35	82	10	2	5	7	2
1983–84	Pittsburgh Penguins	NHL	26	3	2	5	12	—	—	—	—	—
1984–85	Baltimore Skipjacks	AHL	57	9	11	20	125	14	1	1	2	25
NHL totals			414	101	113	214	704	29	5	5	10	24

== Transactions ==
- On June 3, 1975 the Chicago Blackhawks drafted Ted Bulley in the seventh-round (#115 overall) of the 1975 NHL Draft.
- On August 24, 1982 the Chicago Blackhawks traded Dave Hutchison and Ted Bulley to the Washington Capitals in exchange for a 1983 sixth-round pick (#115-Jari Torkki) and a 1984 fifth-round pick (#101-Darin Sceviour).
- On September 30, 1983 the Pittsburgh Penguins signed free agent Ted Bulley.
