= 1991–92 NHL transactions =

This list is for 1991–92 NHL transactions within professional ice hockey league of players in North America. The following contains team-to-team transactions that occurred in the National Hockey League during the 1991–92 NHL season. It lists what team each player has been traded to, or claimed by, and for which players or draft picks, if applicable.

== May ==
May 21, 1991	To Washington Capitals Craig Duncanson; Brent Hughes; Simon Wheeldon	To Winnipeg Jets Bob Joyce; Tyler Larter; Kent Paynter
May 24, 1991	To St. Louis Blues future considerations	To Winnipeg Jets Tom Draper
May 25, 1991	To Quebec Nordiques Miloslav Horava	To New York Rangers Stephane Guerard
May 26, 1991	To Buffalo Sabres 8th-rd pick – 1991 entry draft (# 162 – Jiri Kuntos); 5th-rd pick – 1992 entry draft (TOR - # 106 – Chris DeRuiter)^{1}	To Minnesota North Stars Darcy Wakaluk
May 26, 1991	To Detroit Red Wings Alan Kerr future considerations	To New York Islanders Rick Green
May 30, 1991	To San Jose Sharks Tony Hrkac	To Quebec Nordiques Greg Paslawski
May 30, 1991	To San Jose Sharks Brian Mullen future considerations	To New York Rangers Tim Kerr
May 30, 1991	To Edmonton Oilers Scott Mellanby; Craig Fisher; Craig Berube	To Philadelphia Flyers Corey Foster; Dave Brown; Jari Kurri
May 30, 1991	To Los Angeles Kings Jeff Chychrun; Jari Kurri	To Philadelphia Flyers Steve Duchesne; Steve Kasper; 4th-rd pick – 1991 entry draft (# 86 – Aris Brimanis)
May 30, 1991	To Minnesota North Stars Steve Guenette	To Calgary Flames 7th-rd pick – 1991 entry draft (# 140 – Matt Hoffman)
May 30, 1991	To Minnesota North Stars 7th-rd pick – 1991 entry draft (# 137 – Geoff Finch)	To Winnipeg Jets Rob Murray future considerations
May 31, 1991	To Minnesota North Stars future considerations^{2}	To San Jose Sharks 2nd-rd pick – 1991 entry draft (# 30 – Sandis Ozolinsh); 1st-rd pick – 1992 entry draft (# 10 – Andrei Nazarov)
May 31, 1991	To Minnesota North Stars Alan Haworth	To Quebec Nordiques Guy Lafleur

1. Buffalo's fifth-round pick went to Toronto as the result of a trade on March 10, 1992 that sent Dave Hannan to Buffalo in exchange for this pick.
2. Minnesota's second-round pick in 1991 entry draft and first-round pick in the 1992 entry draft went to San Jose as the result of a trade where San Jose promised Minnesota that they would not draft Mike Craig in the 1991 NHL dispersal draft.

== June ==
June 3, 1991	To Minnesota North Stars Shane Churla	To San Jose Sharks Kelly Kisio
June 3, 1991	To New Jersey Devils Brent Severyn	To Quebec Nordiques Dave Marcinyshyn
June 11, 1991	To Calgary Flames Marc Habscheid	To Detroit Red Wings Brian MacLellan
June 12, 1991	To Edmonton Oilers 5th-rd pick – 1991 entry draft (# 93 – Ryan Haggerty)	To Winnipeg Jets John LeBlanc; 10th-rd pick – 1992 entry draft (# 229 – Teemu Numminen)
June 20, 1991	To Boston Bruins Jim Vesey	To Winnipeg Jets future considerations
June 21, 1991	To Minnesota North Stars Trent Klatt; Steve Maltais	To Washington Capitals Shawn Chambers
June 21, 1991	To Boston Bruins Stephen Leach	To Washington Capitals Randy Burridge
June 22, 1991	To Hartford Whalers future considerations (rights to Jukka Suomalainen)^{1}	To Minnesota North Stars 5th-rd pick – 1991 entry draft (# 97 – Mike Kennedy)
June 22, 1991	To Buffalo Sabres Tom Draper	To Winnipeg Jets 7th-rd pick – 1992 entry draft (# 155 – Artur Oktyabrev)
June 22, 1991	To Minnesota North Stars Tom Kurvers	To Vancouver Canucks Dave Babych
June 22, 1991	To Minnesota North Stars Craig Ludwig	To New York Islanders Tom Kurvers
June 22, 1991	To Minnesota North Stars Todd Elik	To Los Angeles Kings Randy Gilhen; Charlie Huddy; Jim Thomson; 4th-rd pick – 1991 entry draft (# 81 – Alexei Zhitnik)
June 22, 1991	To Quebec Nordiques Mikhail Tatarinov	To Washington Capitals 2nd-rd pick – 1991 entry draft (# 25 – Eric Lavigne)

1. Trade completed on November 21, 1991.

== July ==
July 22, 1991	To Chicago Blackhawks Bryan Marchment; Chris Norton	To Winnipeg Jets Troy Murray; Warren Rychel
July 29, 1991	To Toronto Maple Leafs rights to Mike Bullard	To Philadelphia Flyers 3rd-rd pick – 1993 entry draft (# 71 – Vaclav Prospal)
July 31, 1991	To Vancouver Canucks Robin Bawa	To Washington Capitals cash

== August ==
August 5, 1991	To Philadelphia Flyers future considerations	To New York Rangers Shaun Sabol
August 8, 1991	To Philadelphia Flyers future considerations	To New York Rangers Don Biggs
August 9, 1991	To Montreal Canadiens future considerations	To Minnesota North Stars Jim Nesich
August 26, 1991	To Hartford Whalers Paul Fenton	To Calgary Flames 6th-rd pick – 1992 entry draft (# 129 – Joel Bouchard)

== September ==
September 3, 1991	To Quebec Nordiques Stephane Guerard	To New York Rangers cash
September 6, 1991	To San Jose Sharks Doug Wilson	To Chicago Blackhawks Kerry Toporowski; 2nd-rd pick – 1992 entry draft (WIN - # 27 – Boris Mironov)^{1}
September 8, 1991	To Hartford Whalers 2nd-rd pick – 1992 entry draft (# 47 – Andrei Nikolishin)	To Washington Capitals Sylvain Cote
September 11, 1991	To Boston Bruins 6th-rd pick – 1992 entry draft (# 133 – Jiri Dopita)	To Edmonton Oilers Norm Foster
September 17, 1991	To Hartford Whalers Andrew Cassels	To Montreal Canadiens 2nd-rd pick – 1992 entry draft (# 33 – Valeri Bure)
September 19, 1991	To Toronto Maple Leafs Glenn Anderson; Craig Berube; Grant Fuhr	To Edmonton Oilers Vincent Damphousse; Peter Ing; Luke Richardson; Scott Thornton cash future considerations
September 20, 1991	To San Jose Sharks Wayne Presley	To Chicago Blackhawks 3rd-rd pick – 1993 entry draft (# 54 – Bogdan Savenko)
September 20, 1991	To New Jersey Devils Tom Chorske; Stephane Richer	To Montreal Canadiens Roland Melanson; Kirk Muller
September 22, 1991	To St. Louis Blues Murray Baron; Ron Sutter	To Philadelphia Flyers Rod Brind'Amour; Dan Quinn
September 24, 1991	To Chicago Blackhawks future considerations	To New York Rangers Greg Millen
September 25, 1991	To Quebec Nordiques Mike Dagenais	To Chicago Blackhawks Ryan McGill

1. Chicago's second-round pick went to Winnipeg as the result of a trade on June 20, 1992, that sent Winnipeg's first (# 12 overall) and second-round (# 36 overall) picks in the 1992 entry draft to Chicago in exchange for Chicago's first-round pick (# 17 overall) in the 1992 entry draft and this pick.

== October ==
October 2, 1991	To Hartford Whalers Dan Keczmer	To San Jose Sharks Dean Evason
October 2, 1991	To Edmonton Oilers Dave Manson; 3rd-rd pick – 1992 entry draft (# 65 – Kirk Maltby)	To Chicago Blackhawks Steve Smith
October 3, 1991	To Hartford Whalers 4th-rd pick – 1993 entry draft (CGY - # 95 – Jason Smith)^{1}	To Washington Capitals Todd Krygier
October 3, 1991	To New Jersey Devils 5th-rd pick – 1993 entry draft (# 110 – John Guirestante)	To Hartford Whalers Lee Norwood
October 4, 1991	To Edmonton Oilers Louie DeBrusk; Bernie Nicholls; Steven Rice future considerations (David Shaw)^{2}	To New York Rangers Mark Messier future considerations (Jeff Beukeboom)^{2}
October 7, 1991	To Toronto Maple Leafs Ken Linseman	To Edmonton Oilers cash
October 11, 1991	To Buffalo Sabres Gord Donnelly; Dave McLlwain cash 5th-rd pick – 1992 entry draft (# 108 – Yuri Khmylev)	To Winnipeg Jets Mike Hartman; Dean Kennedy; Darrin Shannon
October 15, 1991	To Minnesota North Stars Tony Joseph	To Winnipeg Jets Tyler Larter
October 16, 1991	To New Jersey Devils future considerations	To Boston Bruins Alan Stewart
October 18, 1991	To Hartford Whalers Mike McHugh	To San Jose Sharks Paul Fenton
October 18, 1991	To St. Louis Blues Rick Zombo	To Detroit Red Wings Vincent Riendeau
October 22, 1991	To Quebec Nordiques Sergei Kharin	To Winnipeg Jets Shawn Anderson
October 23, 1991	To Washington Capitals Shawn Anderson	To Winnipeg Jets future considerations
October 24, 1991	To Buffalo Sabres Colin Patterson	To Calgary Flames future considerations
October 25, 1991	To Buffalo Sabres Randy Hillier; Pat LaFontaine; Randy Wood; 4th-rd pick – 1992 entry draft (# 80 – Dean Melanson)	To New York Islanders Benoit Hogue; Uwe Krupp; Dave McLlwain; Pierre Turgeon
October 25, 1991	To Chicago Blackhawks Brad Lauer; Brent Sutter	To New York Islanders Adam Creighton; Steve Thomas
October 28, 1991	To Los Angeles Kings Chris Norton future considerations	To Chicago Blackhawks Rod Buskas
October 29, 1991	To Boston Bruins Brent Ashton	To Winnipeg Jets Petri Skriko

1. Washington's fourth-round pick went to the Calgary as the result of a trade on June 20, 1993, that sent Sergei Makarov to Hartford in exchange for future considerations (this pick).
2. Trade completed on November 12, 1991.

== November ==
November 13, 1991	To Hartford Whalers 5th-rd pick – 1993 entry draft (# 115 – Nolan Pratt)	To St. Louis Blues Lee Norwood
November 13, 1991	To Hartford Whalers Murray Craven; 4th-rd pick – 1992 entry draft (# 79 – Kevin Smyth)	To Philadelphia Flyers Kevin Dineen
November 14, 1991	To Hartford Whalers future considerations	To Boston Bruins Barry Pederson
November 22, 1991	To Boston Bruins Scott Arniel	To Winnipeg Jets future considerations
November 26, 1991	To St. Louis Blues 8th-rd pick – 1992 entry draft (# 180 – Igor Boldin)	To Winnipeg Jets Mario Marois
November 29, 1991	To Los Angeles Kings Rick Lanz	To Chicago Black Hawks cash

== December ==
December 16, 1991	To Calgary Flames Trent Yawney	To Chicago Blackhawks Stephane Matteau
December 18, 1991	To Hartford Whalers Daniel Shank	To Detroit Red Wings Chris Tancill
December 18, 1991	To Toronto Maple Leafs cash	To Vancouver Canucks Tom Fergus
December 23, 1991	To Los Angeles Kings Corey Millen	To New York Rangers Randy Gilhen
December 26, 1991	To Detroit Red Wings Greg Millen	To New York Rangers 8th-rd pick – 1992 entry draft (EDM - # 190 – Colin Schmidt)^{1}
December 26, 1991	To Toronto Maple Leafs Guy Larose	To New York Rangers Mike Stevens
December 30, 1991	To Minnesota North Stars Warren Rychel	To Winnipeg Jets Tony Joseph

1. The Rangers' eighth-round pick went to Edmonton as the result of a trade on June 20, 1992, that sent Edmonton's fourth-round (# 85 overall) pick in the 1992 entry draft to the Rangers in exchange for the Rangers' fourth-round pick (# 96 overall) in the 1992 entry draft and this pick.

== January ==
January 2, 1992	To Boston Bruins Brian Dobbin; Gord Murphy; 3rd-rd pick – 1992 entry draft (# 55 – Sergei Zholtok) future considerations^{1} (4th-rd pick – 1993 entry draft # 88 – Charles Paquette)	To Philadelphia Flyers Garry Galley; Wes Walz; 3rd-rd pick – 1993 entry draft (# 77 – Milos Holan)
January 2, 1992	To Toronto Maple Leafs Doug Gilmour; Jamie Macoun; Kent Manderville; Ric Nattress; Rick Wamsley	To Calgary Flames Craig Berube; Alexander Godynyuk; Gary Leeman; Michel Petit; Jeff Reese
January 8, 1992	To Boston Bruins 11th-rd pick – 1992 entry draft (# 257 – Evgeny Pavlov)	To Chicago Blackhawks Steve Bancroft; 11th-rd pick – 1993 entry draft (WIN - # 285 – Russ Hewson)^{2}
January 12, 1992	To New Jersey Devils Troy Mallette	To Edmonton Oilers David Maley
January 18, 1992	To Boston Bruins Daniel Berthiaume	To Los Angeles Kings future considerations
January 21, 1992	To Minnesota North Stars David Shaw	To Edmonton Oilers Brian Glynn
January 24, 1992	To Hartford Whalers Steve Konroyd	To Chicago Blackhawks Rob Brown
January 27, 1992	To Hartford Whalers Paul Gillis	To Chicago Blackhawks future considerations

1. Trade completed on June 26, 1993.
2. Boston's eleventh-round pick went to the Winnipeg as the result of a trade on February 21, 1993, that sent Troy Murray to Chicago in exchange for Steve Bancroft and this pick.

== February ==
February 7, 1992	To San Jose Sharks conditional pick – 1993 entry draft (3rd-rd pick - # 154 – Fredrik Oduya)^{1}	To Chicago Blackhawks Tony Hrkac
February 7, 1992	To Chicago Blackhawks Tony Horacek	To Philadelphia Flyers Ryan McGill
February 7, 1992	To Boston Bruins Adam Oates	To St. Louis Blues Craig Janney; Stephane Quintal
February 18, 1992	To Quebec Nordiques John Tonelli	To Chicago Blackhawks future considerations
February 18, 1992	To Los Angeles Kings Steve Weeks	To New York Islanders 7th-rd pick – 1992 entry draft (# 159 – Steve O'Rourke)
February 19, 1992	To Los Angeles Kings Paul Coffey	To Pittsburgh Penguins Brian Benning; Jeff Chychrun; 1st-rd pick – 1992 entry draft (PHI - # 15 – Jason Bowen)^{2}
February 19, 1992	To Pittsburgh Penguins Kjell Samuelsson; Rick Tocchet; Ken Wregget conditional 3rd-rd pick – 1993 entry draft (# 62 – Dave Roche)^{3}	To Philadelphia Flyers Brian Benning; Mark Recchi; 1st-rd pick – 1992 entry draft (# 15 – Jason Bowen)
February 22, 1992	To Edmonton Oilers Bill McDougall	To Detroit Red Wings Max Middendorf
February 24, 1992	To Boston Bruins Brent Hughes future considerations	To Washington Capitals John Byce; Dennis Smith
February 27, 1992	To Toronto Maple Leafs Mark Ferner	To Washington Capitals future considerations
February 27, 1992	To Winnipeg Jets future considerations	To Philadelphia Flyers Moe Mantha Jr.

1. Conditions of this draft pick are unknown.
2. Pittsburgh's first-round pick went to Philadelphia as the result of a trade on February 19, 1992 that sent Kjell Samuelsson, Rick Tocchet, Ken Wregget and Philadelphia's third-round pick in the 1993 entry draft to Pittsburgh in exchange for Brian Benning, Mark Recchi and this pick.
3. Conditions of this draft pick are unknown. Trade completed on June 26, 1993.

== March ==
- Trading Deadline: March 10, 1992

March 2, 1992	To Washington Capitals Paul MacDermid	To Winnipeg Jets Mike Lalor
March 7, 1992	To San Jose Sharks Don Barber	To Quebec Nordiques Murray Garbutt
March 8, 1992	To Minnesota North Stars Kip Miller	To Quebec Nordiques Steve Maltais
March 9, 1992	To San Jose Sharks 8th-rd pick – 1992 entry draft (DET - # 189 – C.J. Denomme)^{1}	To Vancouver Canucks Ken Hammond
March 9, 1992	To San Jose Sharks Johan Garpenlov	To Detroit Red Wings Bob McGill; 8th-rd pick – 1992 entry draft (# 189 – C.J. Denomme)
March 9, 1992	To Buffalo Sabres Wayne Presley	To San Jose Sharks Dave Snuggerud
March 9, 1992	To Buffalo Sabres Randy Moller	To New York Rangers Jay Wells
March 10, 1992	To Hartford Whalers Frank Pietrangelo	To Pittsburgh Penguins 3rd-rd pick – 1994 entry draft (# 57 – Sven Butenschon); 7th-rd pick – 1994 entry draft (# 161 – Serge Aubin)
March 10, 1992	To Buffalo Sabres Petr Svoboda	To Montreal Canadiens Kevin Haller
March 10, 1992	To Toronto Maple Leafs 5th-rd pick – 1992 entry draft (# 106 – Chris DeRuiter)	To Buffalo Sabres Dave Hannan
March 10, 1992	To Minnesota North Stars Mark Janssens	To New York Rangers Mario Thyer; 3rd-rd pick – 1993 entry draft (# 61 – Maxim Galanov)
March 10, 1992	To Quebec Nordiques rights to Scott Young	To Pittsburgh Penguins Bryan Fogarty
March 10, 1992	To Quebec Nordiques Martin Rucinsky	To Edmonton Oilers Ron Tugnutt; Brad Zavisha
March 10, 1992	To Minnesota North Stars Bobby Reynolds	To Washington Capitals future considerations
March 10, 1992	To Quebec Nordiques Martin Simard	To Calgary Flames Greg Smyth
March 10, 1992	To Toronto Maple Leafs Ken Baumgartner; Dave McLlwain	To New York Islanders Claude Loiselle; Daniel Marois
March 10, 1992	To Toronto Maple Leafs Mark Osborne	To Winnipeg Jets Lucien DeBlois

1. San Jose's eighth-round pick went to the Detroit as the result of a trade on March 9, 1992 that sent Johan Garpenlov to San Jose in exchange for Bob McGill and this pick.

== See also ==
- 1991 NHL entry draft
- 1991 in sports
- 1992 in sports
