= David Saunders (ice hockey) =

Canadian ice hockey player

- Born: May 20, 1966 (age 59) Ottawa, Ontario, Canada
- Height: 6 ft 1 in (185 cm)
- Weight: 195 lb (88 kg; 13 st 13 lb)
- Position: Left wing
- Shot: Left
- Played for: Vancouver Canucks
- National team: Canada
- NHL draft: 52nd overall, 1984; Vancouver Canucks
- Playing career: 1987–1990

David Saunders (born May 20, 1966) is a Canadian retired professional ice hockey left winger.

== Career ==
Saunders was drafted 52nd overall by the Vancouver Canucks in the 1984 NHL entry draft and played 56 games for the Canucks during the 1987–88 NHL season, scoring seven goals and 13 assists for 20 points. He also played in the American Hockey League for the Fredericton Express and the International Hockey League for the Flint Spirits and the Milwaukee Admirals before finishing his career in Finland with Vaasan Sport of the I-Divisioona.

== Career statistics ==
=== Regular season and playoffs ===
			Regular season					Playoffs
Season	Team	League	GP	G	A	Pts	PIM	GP	G	A	Pts	PIM
1982–83	Pembroke Lumber Kings	CJHL	48	26	27	53	42	—	—	—	—	—
1983–84	St. Lawrence University	ECAC	32	10	21	31	26	—	—	—	—	—
1984–85	St. Lawrence University	ECAC	27	7	9	16	16	—	—	—	—	—
1985–86	St. Lawrence University	ECAC	29	15	19	34	26	—	—	—	—	—
1986–87	St. Lawrence University	ECAC	34	18	34	52	44	—	—	—	—	—
1987–88	Vancouver Canucks	NHL	56	7	13	20	10	—	—	—	—	—
1987–88	Fredericton Express	AHL	14	9	7	16	6	8	1	0	1	12
1987–88	Flint Spirits	IHL	8	5	5	10	2	—	—	—	—	—
1988–89	Milwaukee Admirals	IHL	21	6	12	18	21	—	—	—	—	—
1989–90	Sport	FIN-2	37	28	18	46	115	—	—	—	—	—
NHL totals			56	7	13	20	10	—	—	—	—	—
