= Juraj Bakoš =

Slovak ice hockey player

- Born: 3 September 1960 (age 66) Bratislava, Czechoslovakia
- Height: 5 ft 11 in (180 cm)
- Weight: 180 lb (82 kg; 12 st 12 lb)
- Position: Defense
- Played for: HC Košice; HK Dukla Trenčín
- National team: Czechoslovakia
- NHL draft: 245th overall, 1984; Philadelphia Flyers
- Playing career: 1977–1988

Juraj Bakoš (born 3 September 1960) is a former Slovak professional ice hockey player who played in the Czechoslovak First Ice Hockey League and currently GM of HC Slovan Bratislava. Bakoš was drafted in the twelfth round of the 1984 NHL entry draft by the Philadelphia Flyers, but he never played professionally in North America. He spent his entire playing career in Czechoslovakia, playing nine seasons with HC Košice and two seasons with HK Dukla Trenčín. Bakoš served as HC Košice's general manager from 2004 to 2017.

== Career statistics ==
			Regular season					Playoffs
Season	Team	League	GP	G	A	Pts	PIM	GP	G	A	Pts	PIM
1977–78	HC Kosice	Czech	7	0	0	0	2	—	—	—	—	—
1978–79	HC Kosice	Czech	—	—	—	—	—	—	—	—	—	—
1979–80	HC Kosice	Czech	28	0	0	0	14	—	—	—	—	—
1980–81	HK Dukla Trencin	Czech	27	2	1	3	10	—	—	—	—	—
1981–82	HK Dukla Trencin	Czech	35	3	6	9	—	—	—	—	—	—
1982–83	HC Kosice	Czech	37	3	2	5	20	—	—	—	—	—
1983–84	HC Kosice	Czech	40	3	8	11	20	—	—	—	—	—
1984–85	HC Kosice	Czech	39	5	4	9	8	—	—	—	—	—
1985–86	HC Kosice	Czech	—	—	—	—	—	—	—	—	—	—
1986–87	HC Kosice	Czech	33	0	0	0	20	7	0	0	0	0
1987–88	HC Kosice	Czech	38	2	0	2	—	—	—	—	—	—
Czech totals			284	18	21	39	94	7	0	0	0	0
