= Shayne Corson =

Canadian ice hockey player (born 1966)

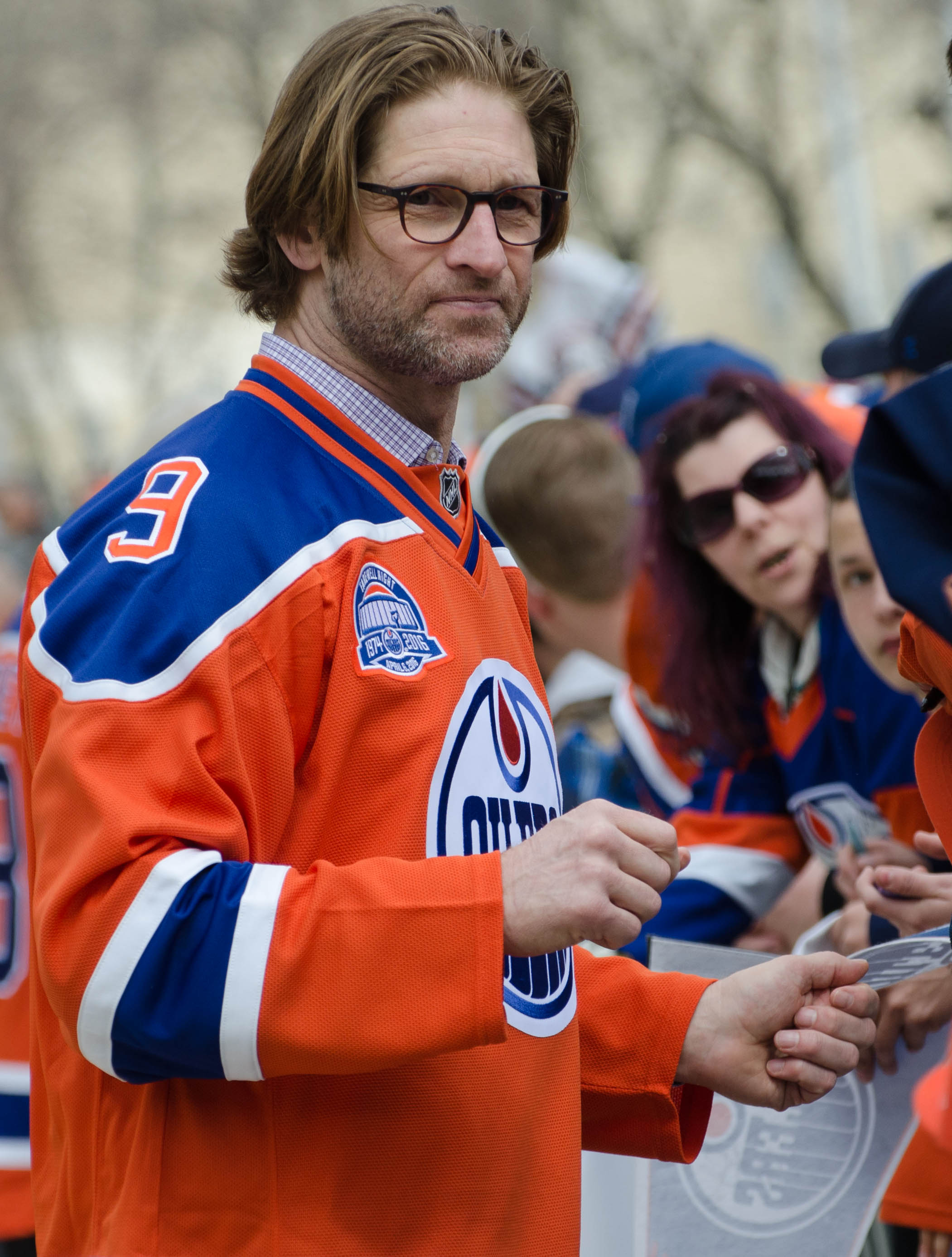
- Corson in 2016
- Born: August 13, 1966 (age 60) Midland, Ontario, Canada
- Height: 6 ft 1 in (185 cm)
- Weight: 202 lb (92 kg; 14 st 6 lb)
- Position: Left wing
- Shot: Left
- Played for: Montreal Canadiens; Edmonton Oilers; St. Louis Blues; Toronto Maple Leafs; Dallas Stars
- National team: Canada
- NHL draft: 8th overall, 1984; Montreal Canadiens
- Playing career: 1985–2004
- Website: shaynecorson.ca
Medal record
Representing Canada
Ice hockey
World Championships
Gold medal – first place	1994 Italy
Canada Cup
Gold medal – first place	1991 Canada
World Junior Championships
Gold medal – first place	1985 Finland
Silver medal – second place	1986 Canada

Shayne Paul Corson (born August 13, 1966) is a Canadian former professional hockey player who played in the National Hockey League (NHL) for the Montreal Canadiens, Edmonton Oilers, St. Louis Blues, Toronto Maple Leafs, and Dallas Stars. During his NHL career, Corson battled both ulcerative colitis and, as detailed in the October 22, 2001, issue of Sports Illustrated, panic attacks. He last played in the 2003–04 season.

== Background and early career ==
Corson was born in Midland, Ontario. As a youth, he played in the 1979 Quebec International Pee-Wee Hockey Tournament with a minor ice hockey team from Barrie. He played in the Ontario Hockey League (OHL) for the Brantford Alexanders (1983–1984) and Hamilton Steelhawks (1984–1986). The Montreal Canadiens drafted him in the first round, eighth overall, of the 1984 NHL entry draft. He played briefly with the Canadiens in the 1985–86 season, then joined the team full-time the following year.

== NHL playing career ==
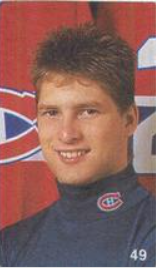
1987 sticker of Corson for Montreal Canadiens

Corson was a regular contributor for the Canadiens from 1986 until 1992, when he was traded to the Edmonton Oilers in exchange for Vincent Damphousse. His time in Edmonton was marred by controversy: after assuming the captaincy to start the 1994-95 season, head coach George Burnett would strip Corson of the captaincy after only 35 games. The next season, he signed an offer sheet from the St. Louis Blues, which the Oilers did not match, and the Oilers received the rights to Curtis Joseph as compensation. He played in Edmonton for three seasons before signing with the Blues. During the 1996–97 season, the Blues traded him back to Montreal, where he played until 2000. The Toronto Maple Leafs then signed him as a free agent, and he spent three full seasons in Toronto before "resigning" in the middle of the post-season partly because of his ulcerative colitis.

In a particularly fierce 2002 Stanley Cup playoffs series against the New York Islanders, Corson was involved in a fight with Eric Cairns, with Cairns being the clear winner of the bout. During the official's attempt to separate Cairns and Corson after the fight, Corson attempted to kick Cairns. The NHL subsequently suspended Corson for the deciding seventh game of the series. The Dallas Stars signed him during the last part of the 2003–04 season in order to add some grit and leadership for their playoff run, but the team was unsuccessful (losing in the first round to the Colorado Avalanche), and Corson retired afterwards.

== Notable achievements ==
Shayne Corson captained two NHL clubs during his 19-season professional career. He has also played for Canada at the Canada Cup, World Junior Ice Hockey Championships, World Cup of Hockey and 1998 Winter Olympics. Corson was known as a gritty player, with good instincts both offensively and defensively. Corson represented his teams three times at the NHL All-Star Game. He scored 693 points and earned 2357 penalty minutes during his 1,156-game regular season NHL career. In addition, he scored 87 points and earned 291 penalty minutes in 140 playoff games.

== Personal life ==
Corson has ulcerative colitis, a chronic digestive disorder that can cause severe pain and significant weight loss. During the later stages of his career, Corson began to suffer from panic attacks, a condition he has not attributed to any single event, but which may have been precipitated by his battles with colitis and the premature death of his father, Paul Corson, from throat cancer in 1993.

Corson's sister Shannon is married to his former Toronto Maple Leaf teammate Darcy Tucker. In retirement, Corson (often with Tucker) has been a prominent proponent of building a cancer care facility, the Simcoe-Muskoka Regional Cancer Centre, as part of Barrie's Royal Victoria Hospital.

Corson opened his first restaurant in 2007 with partner Armando Russo in the Distillery District of Toronto, called Tappo Wine Bar & Restaurant. They opened a second restaurant in Barrie, Ontario, named Corson's, which began as a family restaurant but was converted to a sports bar and grill which displays his jerseys and other hockey memorabilia but has since closed. (Mom's Pantry, an older restaurant in Barrie, was opened by Shayne Corson's father but is no longer run by the Corson family.)

Corson's daughter, Willow, played hockey for five seasons (2017 to 2022) at Boston College, in the NCAA.

== Awards and honours ==
- All-Star selection, forward, 1986 World Junior Ice Hockey Championships
- 3× NHL All-Star Game: 1990, 1994 and 1998

== Career statistics ==
=== Regular season and playoffs ===
			Regular season					Playoffs
Season	Team	League	GP	G	A	Pts	PIM	GP	G	A	Pts	PIM
1982–83	Barrie Colts	CJHL	23	13	29	42	87	—	—	—	—	—
1983–84	Brantford Alexanders	OHL	66	25	46	71	165	6	4	1	5	26
1984–85	Hamilton Steelhawks	OHL	54	27	63	90	154	11	3	7	10	19
1985–86	Hamilton Steelhawks	OHL	47	41	57	98	153	—	—	—	—	—
1985–86	Montreal Canadiens	NHL	3	0	0	0	2	—	—	—	—	—
1986–87	Montreal Canadiens	NHL	55	12	11	23	144	17	6	5	11	30
1987–88	Montreal Canadiens	NHL	71	12	27	39	152	3	1	0	1	12
1988–89	Montreal Canadiens	NHL	80	26	24	50	193	21	4	5	9	65
1989–90	Montreal Canadiens	NHL	76	31	44	75	144	11	2	8	10	20
1990–91	Montreal Canadiens	NHL	71	23	24	47	138	13	9	6	15	36
1991–92	Montreal Canadiens	NHL	64	17	36	53	118	10	2	5	7	15
1992–93	Edmonton Oilers	NHL	80	16	31	47	209	—	—	—	—	—
1993–94	Edmonton Oilers	NHL	64	25	29	54	118	—	—	—	—	—
1994–95	Edmonton Oilers	NHL	48	12	24	36	86	—	—	—	—	—
1995–96	St. Louis Blues	NHL	77	18	28	46	192	13	8	6	14	22
1996–97	St. Louis Blues	NHL	11	2	1	3	24	—	—	—	—	—
1996–97	Montreal Canadiens	NHL	47	6	15	21	80	5	1	0	1	4
1997–98	Montreal Canadiens	NHL	62	21	34	55	108	10	3	6	9	26
1998–99	Montreal Canadiens	NHL	63	12	20	32	147	—	—	—	—	—
1999–2000	Montreal Canadiens	NHL	70	8	20	28	115	—	—	—	—	—
2000–01	Toronto Maple Leafs	NHL	77	8	18	26	189	11	1	1	2	14
2001–02	Toronto Maple Leafs	NHL	74	12	21	33	120	19	1	6	7	33
2002–03	Toronto Maple Leafs	NHL	46	7	8	15	49	2	0	0	0	2
2003–04	Dallas Stars	NHL	17	5	5	10	29	5	0	1	1	12
NHL totals			1,156	273	420	693	2,357	140	38	49	87	291

=== International ===
Year	Team	Event	GP	G	A	Pts	PIM
1985	Canada	WJC	7	2	3	5	2
1986	Canada	WJC	7	7	7	14	6
1991	Canada	CC	8	0	5	5	12
1993	Canada	WC	8	3	7	10	6
1994	Canada	WC	7	3	0	3	4
1998	Canada	OG	6	1	1	2	2
Junior totals			14	9	10	19	8
Senior totals			29	7	13	20	24

== See also ==
- List of NHL players with 1,000 games played
- List of NHL players with 2,000 career penalty minutes
- List of people diagnosed with ulcerative colitis

Preceded by Petr Svoboda	Montreal Canadiens first-round draft pick 1984	Succeeded by José Charbonneau
Preceded by Craig MacTavish	Edmonton Oilers captain 1995	Succeeded by Kelly Buchberger
Preceded by Brett Hull	St. Louis Blues captain 1995–96	Succeeded by Wayne Gretzky
