= Petr Svoboda =

Czech ice hockey player

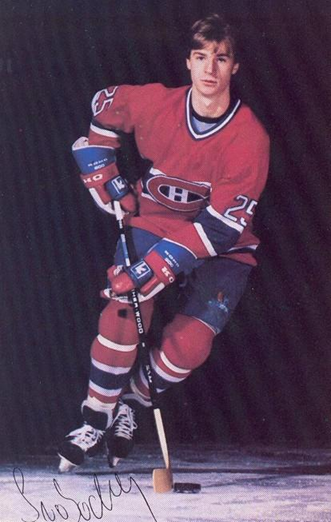
- Born: February 14, 1966 (age 60) Most, Czechoslovakia
- Height: 6 ft 1 in (185 cm)
- Weight: 190 lb (86 kg; 13 st 8 lb)
- Position: Defence
- Shot: Left
- Played for: CHZ Litvínov; Montreal Canadiens; Buffalo Sabres; Philadelphia Flyers; Tampa Bay Lightning
- National team: Czechoslovakia and Czech Republic
- NHL draft: 5th overall, 1984; Montreal Canadiens
- Playing career: 1982–2001

Petr Svoboda (born February 14, 1966) is a Czech former professional ice hockey defenceman. He played 17 seasons in the National Hockey League (NHL) for the Montreal Canadiens, Buffalo Sabres, Philadelphia Flyers and Tampa Bay Lightning. He was the first Czech to play over 1,000 games in the NHL.

He is the former director of hockey operations for Lausanne HC.

== Playing career ==
In 1984, Svoboda had participated in the European Under-18 ice hockey championships in then-West Germany as a part of the Czechoslovak team, and after the completion of the tournament, he defected to the West in order to play hockey at a higher professional level. That spring, he was selected fifth overall in the 1984 NHL entry draft by the Montreal Canadiens. His career highlights include winning the Stanley Cup with the Canadiens in 1986, and winning gold with the Czech team in the 1998 Winter Olympics in Nagano, Japan, where he scored the only goal in the gold medal game against Russia. He retired from professional hockey in 2001 and then worked as a player agent. In May 2020, he became co-owner and director of hockey operations for Lausanne HC in Switzerland.

== Career statistics ==
=== Regular season and playoffs ===
			Regular season					Playoffs
Season	Team	League	GP	G	A	Pts	PIM	GP	G	A	Pts	PIM
1982–83	TJ CHZ Litvínov	TCH	4	0	0	0	2	—	—	—	—	—
1983–84	TJ CHZ Litvínov	TCH	18	3	1	4	20	—	—	—	—	—
1984–85	Montreal Canadiens	NHL	73	4	27	31	65	7	1	1	2	12
1985–86	Montreal Canadiens	NHL	73	1	18	19	93	8	0	0	0	21
1986–87	Montreal Canadiens	NHL	70	5	17	22	63	14	0	5	5	10
1987–88	Montreal Canadiens	NHL	69	7	22	29	149	10	0	5	5	12
1988–89	Montreal Canadiens	NHL	71	8	37	45	147	21	1	11	12	16
1989–90	Montreal Canadiens	NHL	60	5	31	36	98	10	0	5	5	2
1990–91	Montreal Canadiens	NHL	60	4	22	26	52	2	0	1	1	2
1991–92	Montreal Canadiens	NHL	58	5	16	21	94	—	—	—	—	—
1991–92	Buffalo Sabres	NHL	13	1	6	7	52	7	1	4	5	6
1992–93	Buffalo Sabres	NHL	40	2	24	26	59	—	—	—	—	—
1993–94	Buffalo Sabres	NHL	60	2	14	16	89	3	0	0	0	4
1994–95	HC Litvínov, s.r.o.	ELH	8	2	0	2	50	—	—	—	—	—
1994–95	Buffalo Sabres	NHL	26	0	5	5	60	—	—	—	—	—
1994–95	Philadelphia Flyers	NHL	11	0	3	3	10	14	0	4	4	8
1995–96	Philadelphia Flyers	NHL	73	1	28	29	105	12	0	6	6	22
1996–97	Philadelphia Flyers	NHL	67	2	12	14	94	16	1	2	3	16
1997–98	Philadelphia Flyers	NHL	56	3	15	18	83	3	0	1	1	4
1998–99	Philadelphia Flyers	NHL	25	4	2	6	28	—	—	—	—	—
1998–99	Tampa Bay Lightning	NHL	34	1	16	17	53	—	—	—	—	—
1999–00	Tampa Bay Lightning	NHL	70	2	23	25	170	—	—	—	—	—
2000–01	Tampa Bay Lightning	NHL	19	1	3	4	41	—	—	—	—	—
NHL totals			1,028	58	341	399	1,605	127	4	45	49	135

=== International ===
Olympic medal record

Men's Ice hockey
Gold medal – first place	1998 Nagano	Ice hockey

Year	Team	Event	GP	G	A	Pts	PIM
1983	Czechoslovakia	EJC	5	0	0	0	8
1984	Czechoslovakia	WJC	7	0	4	4	16
1984	Czechoslovakia	EJC	5	1	1	2	16
1998	Czech Republic	OG	6	1	1	2	39
Junior totals			17	1	5	6	40
Senior totals			6	1	1	2	39

== See also ==
- List of NHL players with 1,000 games played

Preceded by Alfie Turcotte	Montreal Canadiens' first-round draft pick 1984	Succeeded by Shayne Corson
