= 1984 NHL entry draft =

1984 North American ice hockey draft

General information
- Date: June 9, 1984
- Location: Montreal Forum; Montreal, Quebec, Canada

Overview
- 250 total selections in 12 rounds
- First selection: (Canada) Mario Lemieux (Pittsburgh Penguins)
- Hall of Famers: 4: C Mario Lemieux; G Patrick Roy; RW Brett Hull; LW Luc Robitaille

The 1984 NHL entry draft was the 22nd draft for the National Hockey League. It took place on June 9, 1984, at the Montreal Forum in Montreal.

The 1984 entry draft is noted for the unusually high number of future Hall of Famers picked, particularly in lower rounds. In addition to Mario Lemieux being taken first overall, Patrick Roy was chosen in the third round, Brett Hull in the sixth, and Luc Robitaille in the ninth. In addition, Lemieux, Gary Suter and Robitaille would all go on to win the Calder Memorial Trophy, Lemieux in 1985, Suter in 1986, and Robitaille in 1987, making this a rare draft in which multiple Rookie of the Year winners were produced.

The surprise at the time of the draft was Montreal's selection of Petr Svoboda at fifth-overall. As a player trained behind the Iron Curtain, very few people expected him to be available for selection in the draft, let alone be actually attending the draft and coming to the podium when his name was announced, as he had only recently defected to West Germany following the 1984 European under 18 championship (only Serge Savard, the GM of the Canadiens, had been aware of Svoboda's defection).

In addition to Svoboda, of note is that Tom Glavine, playing centre in high school, who later became a star Major League Baseball pitcher with more than 300 career wins, as well as a 2014 inductee of the Baseball Hall of Fame was chosen in the fourth round (69th overall) by the Los Angeles Kings, ahead of notable players such as future Hall of Famers Brett Hull (117th overall), and Luc Robitaille (171st overall).

The Montreal Canadiens, with their last pick, drafted Troy Crosby, the father of Sidney Crosby.

The last active player in the NHL from this draft class was Gary Roberts, who retired after the 2008–09 season.

== Selections by round ==
Below are listed the selections in the 1984 NHL entry draft. Club teams are located in North America unless otherwise noted.

= NHL All-Star team ·	= NHL All-Star (Note: Players are identified as an All-Star if they were selected for the All-Star game at any time in their career.) ·	= NHL All-Star and NHL All-Star team ·	= Hall of Famers

=== Round one ===
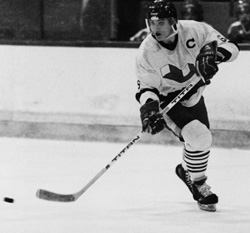
Mario Lemieux was selected first overall by the Pittsburgh Penguins.

#	Player	Nationality	NHL team	College/junior/club team
1	Mario Lemieux (C)	Canada	Pittsburgh Penguins	Laval Voisins (QMJHL)
2	Kirk Muller (C)	Canada	New Jersey Devils	Guelph Platers (OHL)
3	Eddie Olczyk (LW)	United States	Chicago Black Hawks (from Los Angeles)^{1}	U.S. National Team (Intl)
4	Al Iafrate (D)	United States	Toronto Maple Leafs	Belleville Bulls (OHL)
5	Petr Svoboda (D)	Czechoslovakia	Montreal Canadiens (from Hartford)^{2}	CHZ Litvinov (Czechoslovakia)
6	Craig Redmond (D)	Canada	Los Angeles Kings (from Chicago)^{3}	University of Denver (WCHA)
7	Shawn Burr (C)	Canada	Detroit Red Wings	Kitchener Rangers (OHL)
8	Shayne Corson (C)	Canada	Montreal Canadiens (from St. Louis)^{4}	Brantford Alexanders (OHL)
9	Doug Bodger (D)	Canada	Pittsburgh Penguins (from Winnipeg)^{5}	Kamloops Jr. Oilers (WHL)
10	J. J. Daigneault (D)	Canada	Vancouver Canucks	Longueuil Chevaliers (QMJHL)
11	Sylvain Cote (D)	Canada	Hartford Whalers (from Montreal)^{6}	Quebec Remparts (QMJHL)
12	Gary Roberts (LW)	Canada	Calgary Flames	Ottawa 67's (OHL)
13	David Quinn (D)	United States	Minnesota North Stars	Kent H.S. (Conn.)
14	Terry Carkner (D)	Canada	New York Rangers	Peterborough Petes (OHL)
15	Trevor Stienburg (RW)	Canada	Quebec Nordiques	Guelph Platers (OHL)
16	Roger Belanger (C)	Canada	Pittsburgh Penguins (from Philadelphia)^{7}	Kingston Canadians (OHL)
17	Kevin Hatcher (D)	United States	Washington Capitals	North Bay Centennials (OHL)
18	Mikael Andersson (LW)	Sweden	Buffalo Sabres	Västra Frölunda (Sweden)
19	Dave Pasin (RW)	Canada	Boston Bruins	Prince Albert Raiders (WHL)
20	Duncan MacPherson (D)	Canada	New York Islanders	Saskatoon Blades (WHL)
21	Selmar Odelein (D)	Canada	Edmonton Oilers	Regina Pats (WHL)

1. The Los Angeles Kings' first-round pick went to the Chicago Black Hawks as the result of a trade on June 9, 1984 that sent Bob Janecyk, Chicago's first-round, third-round and fourth-round picks in 1984 NHL Entry Draft to Los Angeles in exchange for Los Angeles's fourth-round pick in 1984 NHL Entry Draft and this pick.
2. The Hartford Whalers' first-round pick went to the Montreal Canadiens as the result of a trade on December 21, 1981 that sent Pierre Larouche, Montreal's first-round pick in 1984 NHL Entry Draft and third-round pick in 1985 NHL entry draft to Hartford in exchange for Hartford's second-round pick in 1984 NHL Entry Draft, third-round pick in 1985 NHL entry draft and this pick.
3. The Chicago Black Hawks' first-round pick went to the Los Angeles as the result of a trade on June 9, 1984 that sent Los Angeles' first-round and fourth-round picks in 1984 NHL Entry Draft to Chicago in exchange for Bob Janecyk, Chicago's third-round, fourth-round picks in 1984 NHL Entry Draft and this pick.
4. The St. Louis Blues' first-round pick went to the Montreal Canadiens as the result of a trade on June 9, 1984 that sent Rick Wamsley, Montreal's two second-round (pick #26 & pick #32) and third-round picks in 1984 NHL Entry Draft to St. Louis in exchange for St. Louis' second-round pick in 1984 NHL Entry Draft and this pick.
5. The Winnipeg Jets' first-round pick went to the Pittsburgh Penguins as the result of a trade on March 5, 1984 that sent Randy Carlyle to Winnipeg in exchange for future considerations (Moe Mantha Jr.) and this pick.
6. The Montreal Canadiens' first-round pick went to the Hartford Whalers as the result of a trade on December 21, 1981 that sent Hartford's first-round and second-round pick in 1984 NHL Entry Draft with a third-round pick in 1985 NHL entry draft in exchange for Pierre Larouche, Montreal's third-round pick in 1985 NHL entry draft and this pick.
7. The Philadelphia Flyers' first-round pick went to the Pittsburgh Penguins as the result of a trade on October 23, 1983 that sent Rich Sutter, Pittsburgh's 2nd-rd pick and 3rd-rd picks in 1984 NHL Entry Draft in exchange for Andy Brickley, Ron Flockhart, Mark Taylor Philadelphia's 3rd-rd pick in 1984 NHL Entry Draft and this pick.

=== Round two ===
#	Player	Nationality	NHL team	College/junior/club team
22	Greg Smyth (D)	Canada	Philadelphia Flyers (from Pittsburgh)^{1}	London Knights (OHL)
23	Craig Billington (G)	Canada	New Jersey Devils	Belleville Bulls (OHL)
24	Brian Wilks (C)	Canada	Los Angeles Kings	Kitchener Rangers (OHL)
25	Todd Gill (D)	Canada	Toronto Maple Leafs	Windsor Spitfires (OHL)
26	Brian Benning (D)	Canada	St. Louis Blues (from Hartford via Montreal)^{2}	Portland Winter Hawks (WHL)
27	Scott Mellanby (RW)	Canada	Philadelphia Flyers (from Chicago)^{3}	Henry Carr Crusaders (MetJHL)
28	Doug Houda (D)	Canada	Detroit Red Wings	Calgary Wranglers (WHL)
29	Stephane Richer (C)	Canada	Montreal Canadiens (from St. Louis)^{4}	Granby Bisons (QMJHL)
30	Peter Douris (C)	Canada	Winnipeg Jets	University of New Hampshire (ECAC)
31	Jeff Rohlicek (LW)	United States	Vancouver Canucks	Portland Winter Hawks (WHL)
32	Tony Hrkac (C)	Canada	St. Louis Blues (from Montreal)^{5}	Orillia Travelways (OJHL)
33	Ken Sabourin (D)	Canada	Calgary Flames	Sault Ste. Marie Greyhounds (OHL)
34	Steve Leach (RW)	United States	Washington Capitals (from Minnesota)^{6}	Matignon High School (USHS-MA)
35	Raimo Helminen (C)	Finland	New York Rangers	Ilves (Finland)
36	Jeff Brown (D)	Canada	Quebec Nordiques	Sudbury Wolves (OHL)
37	Jeff Chychrun (D)	Canada	Philadelphia Flyers	Kingston Canadians (OHL)
38	Paul Ranheim (LW)	United States	Calgary Flames (from Washington)^{7}	Edina High School (USHS-MN)
39	Doug Trapp (LW)	Canada	Buffalo Sabres	Regina Pats (WHL)
40	Ray Podloski (C)	Canada	Boston Bruins	Portland Winter Hawks (WHL)
41	Bruce Melanson (RW)	Canada	New York Islanders	Oshawa Generals (OHL)
42	Daryl Reaugh (G)	Canada	Edmonton Oilers	Kamloops Jr. Oilers (WHL)

1. The Pittsburgh Penguins' second-round pick went to the Philadelphia Flyers as the result of a trade on October 23, 1983 that sent Andy Brickley, Ron Flockhart, Mark Taylor, Philadelphia's 1st-rd and 3rd-rd picks in 1984 NHL Entry Draft to Pittsburgh in exchange for Rich Sutter, Pittsburgh's 3rd-rd pick in 1984 NHL Entry Draft and this pick.
2. The Montreal Canadiens' second-round pick went to the St. Louis Blues as the result of a trade on June 9, 1984 that sent St. Louis' first-round and second-round picks in 1984 NHL Entry Draft to Montreal in exchange for Rick Wamsley, Montreal's second-round pick (32nd overall) and third-round pick in 1984 NHL Entry Draft along with this pick.
  Montreal previously acquired this pick as the result of a trade on December 21, 1981 that sent that sent Pierre Larouche, Montreal's first-round pick in 1984 NHL Entry Draft and third-round pick in 1985 NHL entry draft to Hartford in exchange for Hartford's first-round pick in 1984 NHL Entry Draft, third-round pick in 1985 NHL entry draft and this pick.
3. The Chicago Black Hawks' second-round pick went to the Philadelphia Flyers as the result of a trade on June 8, 1983 that sent Behn Wilson to Chicago in exchange for Doug Crossman and this pick.
4. The St. Louis Blues' second-round pick went to the Montreal Canadiens as the result of a trade on June 9, 1984 that sent Rick Wamsley, Montreal's two second-round (pick #26 & pick #32) and third-round picks in 1984 NHL Entry Draft to St. Louis in exchange for St. Louis' first-round pick in 1984 NHL Entry Draft and this pick.
5. The Montreal Canadiens' second-round pick went to the St. Louis Blues as the result of a trade on June 9, 1984 that sent St. Louis' first-round and second-round picks in 1984 NHL Entry Draft to Montreal in exchange for Rick Wamsley, Montreal's second-round pick (26th overall) and third-round pick in 1984 NHL Entry Draft along with this pick.
6. The Minnesota North Stars' second-round pick went to the Washington Capitals as the result of a trade on July 5, 1983 that sent Dennis Maruk to Minnesota in exchange for this pick.
7. The Washington Capitals' second-round pick went to the Calgary Flames as the result of a trade on June 9, 1982 that sent Ken Houston and Pat Riggin to Washington in exchange for Howard Walker, George White, Washington's sixth-round pick in 1982 NHL entry draft, third-round pick in 1983 NHL entry draft and this pick.

=== Round three ===
#	Player	Nationality	NHL team	College/junior/club team
43	David McLay (LW)	Canada	Philadelphia Flyers (from Pittsburgh)^{1}	Kelowna Wings (WHL)
44	Neil Davey (D)	Canada	New Jersey Devils	Michigan State (CCHA)
45	Trent Yawney (D)	Canada	Chicago Black Hawks (from Los Angeles)^{2}	Saskatoon Blades (WHL)
46	Ken Hodge, Jr. (C)	United States	Minnesota North Stars (from Toronto via Montreal)^{3}	St. John's School (USHS-MA)
47	John Stevens (D)	Canada	Philadelphia Flyers (from Hartford)	Oshawa Generals (OHL)
48	John English (D)	Canada	Los Angeles Kings (from Chicago)^{4}	Sault Ste. Marie Greyhounds (OHL)
49	Milan Chalupa (D)	Czechoslovakia	Detroit Red Wings	HC Dukla Jihlava (Czechoslovakia)
50	Toby Ducolon (RW)	United States	St. Louis Blues	Bellows Free Academy (USHS-VT)
51	Patrick Roy (G)	Canada	Montreal Canadiens (from Winnipeg)^{5}	Granby Bisons (QMJHL)
52	David Saunders (LW)	Canada	Vancouver Canucks	St. Lawrence University (ECAC)
53	Robert Dirk (D)	Canada	St. Louis Blues (from Montreal)^{6}	Regina Pats (WHL)
54	Graeme Bonar (RW)	Canada	Montreal Canadiens (from Calgary)^{7}	Sault Ste. Marie Greyhounds (OHL)
55	Landis Chaulk (LW)	Canada	Vancouver Canucks (from Minnesota)^{8}	Calgary Wranglers (WHL)
56	Alan Perry (G)	United States	St. Louis Blues (from the Rangers)^{9}	Mount St. Charles Academy (USHS-RI)
57	Steven Finn (D)	Canada	Quebec Nordiques	Laval Voisins (QMJHL)
58	Mike Stevens (C)	Canada	Vancouver Canucks (from Philadelphia via Pittsburgh)^{10}	Kitchener Rangers (OHL)
59	Michal Pivonka (C)	Czechoslovakia	Washington Capitals	Poldi Kladno (Czechoslovakia)
60	Ray Sheppard (RW)	Canada	Buffalo Sabres	Cornwall Royals (OHL)
61	Jeff Cornelius (D)	Canada	Boston Bruins	Toronto Marlboros (OHL)
62	Jeff Norton (D)	United States	New York Islanders	Cushing Academy (USHS-MA)
63	Todd Norman (C)	United States	Edmonton Oilers	Hill-Murray High School (USHS-MN)

1. The Pittsburgh Penguins' third-round pick went to the Philadelphia Flyers as the result of a trade on October 23, 1983 that sent Andy Brickley, Ron Flockhart, Mark Taylor, Philadelphia's 1st-rd and 3rd-rd picks in 1984 NHL Entry Draft to Pittsburgh in exchange for Rich Sutter, Pittsburgh's 2nd-rd pick in 1984 NHL Entry Draft and this pick.
2. The Los Angeles Kings' third-round pick went to the Chicago Black Hawks as the result of a trade on October 24, 1982 that sent the Terry Ruskowski to Los Angeles in exchange for Larry Goodenough and this pick.
3. The Montreal Canadiens' third-round pick went to the Minnesota North Stars as the result of a trade on October 28, 1983 that sent the Bobby Smith to Montreal in exchange for Keith Acton, Mark Napier and this pick.
  Montreal previously acquired this pick as the result of a trade on December 17, 1982 that sent Dan Daoust to Toronto in exchange for this pick.
4. The Chicago Black Hawks' first-round pick went to the Los Angeles as the result of a trade on June 9, 1984 that sent Los Angeles' first-round and fourth-round picks in 1984 NHL Entry Draft to Chicago in exchange for Bob Janecyk, Chicago's first-round, fourth-round picks in 1984 NHL Entry Draft and this pick.
5. The Winnipeg Jets' third-round pick went to the Montreal Canadiens as the result of a trade on November 4, 1983 that sent the Robert Picard to Winnipeg in exchange for this pick.
6. The Montreal Canadiens' third-round pick went to the St. Louis Blues as the result of a trade on June 9, 1984 that sent St. Louis' first-round and second-round picks in 1984 NHL Entry Draft to Montreal in exchange for Rick Wamsley, Montreal's two second-round pick (26th and 32nd overall) and with this pick.
7. The Calgary Flames' third-round pick went to the Montreal Canadiens as the result of a trade on September 10, 1982 that sent the Doug Risebrough and Montreal's second-round pick in 1983 NHL entry draft to Calgary in exchange for Calgary's second-round pick in 1983 NHL entry draft and this pick.
8. The Minnesota North Stars' third-round pick went to the Vancouver Canucks as the result of a trade on October 20, 1983 that sent the Lars Lindgren to Minnesota in exchange for this pick.
9. The New York Rangers' third-round pick went to the St. Louis Blues as the result of a trade on March 5, 1984 that sent the Larry Patey and the rights to Bob Brooke to the Rangers in exchange for Dave Barr, cash and this pick.
10. The Pittsburgh Penguins' third-round pick went to the Vancouver Canucks as the result of a trade on January 26, 1984 that sent the Kevin McCarthy to Pittsburgh in exchange for this pick.
  Pittsburgh previously acquired this pick as the result of a trade with the Philadelphia Flyers on October 23, 1983 that sent Rich Sutter, Pittsburgh's 2nd-rd pick and 3rd-rd picks in 1984 NHL Entry Draft in exchange for Andy Brickley, Ron Flockhart, Mark Taylor Philadelphia's 1st-rd pick in 1984 NHL Entry Draft and this pick.

=== Round four ===
#	Player	Nationality	NHL team	College/junior/club team
64	Mark Teevens (RW)	Canada	Pittsburgh Penguins	Peterborough Petes (OHL)
65	Lee Brodeur (RW)	United States	Montreal Canadiens (from New Jersey)^{1}	Grafton High School (USHS-ND)
66	Tommy Eriksson (LW)	Sweden	Chicago Black Hawks (from Los Angeles)^{2}	Modo Hockey (Sweden)
67	Jeff Reese (G)	Canada	Toronto Maple Leafs	London Knights (OHL)
68	Chris Mills (D)	Canada	Winnipeg Jets (from Hartford)^{3}	Bramalea Blues (MetJHL)
69	Tom Glavine (C)	United States	Los Angeles Kings (from Chicago)^{4}	Billerica High School (USHS-MA)
70	Doug Wieck (LW)	United States	New York Islanders (from Detroit via Los Angeles)^{5}	Mayo High School (USHS-MN)
71	Graham Herring (D)	Canada	St. Louis Blues	Longueuil Chevaliers (QMJHL)
72	Sean Clement (D)	Canada	Winnipeg Jets	Brockville Braves (CJHL)
73	Brian Bertuzzi (C)	Canada	Vancouver Canucks	Kamloops Jr. Oilers (WHL)
74	Paul Ysebaert (C)	Canada	New Jersey Devils (from Montreal)^{6}	Petrolia Jets (WOJBHL)
75	Petr Rosol (RW)	Czechoslovakia	Calgary Flames	HC Dukla Jihlava (Czechoslovakia)
76	Miroslav Maly (D)	Czechoslovakia	Minnesota North Stars	SV Bayreuth (West Germany)
77	Paul Broten (C)	United States	New York Rangers	Roseau High School (USHS-MN))
78	Terry Perkins (RW)	Canada	Quebec Nordiques	Portland Winter Hawks (WHL)
79	Dave Hanson (C)	United States	Philadelphia Flyers	Grand Forks High School (USHS-ND)
80	Kris King (C)	Canada	Washington Capitals	Peterborough Petes (OHL)
81	Bob Halkidis (D)	Canada	Buffalo Sabres	London Knights (OHL)
82	Bob Joyce (LW)	Canada	Boston Bruins	Notre Dame Hounds (SJHL)
83	Ari Haanpaa (RW)	Finland	New York Islanders	Ilves (Finland)
84	Rich Novak (RW)	Canada	Edmonton Oilers	Richmond Sockeyes (BCJHL)

1. The New Jersey Devils' fourth-round pick went to the Montreal Canadiens as the result of a trade on March 10, 1981 that sent Bill Baker to Colorado in exchange for New Jersey's third-round pick in 1983 NHL entry draft and Montreal's option to swap fourth-round picks in this year's draft (this pick, New Jersey gets pick # 74). Colorado relocated to New Jersey on May 27, 1982.
2. The Los Angeles Kings' first-round pick went to the Chicago Black Hawks as the result of a trade on June 9, 1984 that sent Bob Janecyk, Chicago's first-round, third-round and fourth-round picks in 1984 NHL Entry Draft to Los Angeles in exchange for Los Angeles's first-round pick in 1984 NHL Entry Draft and this pick.
3. The Hartford Whalers' fourth-round pick went to the Winnipeg Jets as the result of a trade on July 4, 1983 that sent Norm Dupont to Hartford in exchange for this pick.
4. The Chicago Black Hawks' first-round pick went to the Los Angeles as the result of a trade on June 9, 1984 that sent Los Angeles' first-round and fourth-round picks in 1984 NHL Entry Draft to Chicago in exchange for Bob Janecyk, Chicago's first-round, third-round picks in 1984 NHL Entry Draft and this pick.
5. The Los Angeles Kings' fourth-round pick went to the New York Islanders as the result of a trade on November 17, 1983 that sent Mike McEwen to Los Angeles in exchange for this pick.
  Los Angeles previously acquired this pick as the result of a trade on June 8, 1983 that sent Los Angeles' fourth-round pick in 1983 NHL entry draft to Detroit in exchange for this pick.
6. The Montreal Canadiens' fourth-round pick went to the New Jersey Devils as the result of a trade on March 10, 1981 that sent New Jersey's third-round pick in 1983 NHL entry draft and Montreal's option to swap fourth-round picks in this year's draft (pick # 65) in exchange for Bill Baker and this pick. Colorado relocated to New Jersey on May 27, 1982.

=== Round five ===
#	Player	Nationality	NHL team	College/junior/club team
85	Arto Javanainen (RW)	Finland	Pittsburgh Penguins	Ässät (Finland)
86	Jon Morris (C)	United States	New Jersey Devils	Chelmsford High School (USHS-MA)
87	David Grannis (LW)	United States	Los Angeles Kings	South St. Paul High School (USHS-MN)
88	Jack Capuano (D)	United States	Toronto Maple Leafs	Kent School (USHS-CT)
89	Jiri Poner (RW)	Czechoslovakia	Minnesota North Stars (from Hartford)^{1}	Landshut (West Germany)
90	Timo Lehkonen (G)	Finland	Chicago Black Hawks	Jokerit (Finland)
91	Mats-Ake Lundstrom (LW)	Sweden	Detroit Red Wings	Skellefteå AIK (Sweden)
92	Scott Paluch (D)	United States	St. Louis Blues	Franklin Park Jets (USHL)
93	Scott Schneider (C)	United States	Winnipeg Jets	Colorado College (WCHA)
94	Brett MacDonald (D)	Canada	Vancouver Canucks	North Bay Centennials (OHL)
95	Gerald Johannson (D)	Canada	Montreal Canadiens	Swift Current Broncos (WHL)
96	Joel Paunio (LW)	Finland	Calgary Flames	HIFK (Finland)
97	Kari Takko (G)	Finland	Minnesota North Stars	Assat (Finland)
98	Clark Donatelli (LW)	United States	New York Rangers	Stratford Cullitons (MWJBHL)
99	Brent Severyn (D)	Canada	Winnipeg Jets (from Quebec)^{2}	Seattle Breakers (WHL)
100	Brian Dobbin (RW)	Canada	Philadelphia Flyers	London Knights (OHL)
101	Darin Sceviour (RW)	Canada	Chicago Black Hawks (from Washington)^{3}	Lethbridge Broncos (WHL)
102	Joey Rampton (LW)	Canada	Buffalo Sabres	Sault Ste. Marie Greyhounds (OHL)
103	Mike Bishop (G)	Canada	Boston Bruins	London Knights (OHL)
104	Mike Murray (C)	Canada	New York Islanders	London Knights (OHL)
105	Richard Lambert (LW)	Canada	Edmonton Oilers	Henry Carr Crusaders (MetJHL)

1. The Hartford Whalers' fifth-round pick went to the Minnesota North Stars as the result of a trade on October 1, 1982 that sent Kent-Erik Andersson and Mark Johnson to Hartford in exchange for Jordy Douglas and this pick.
2. The Quebec Nordiques' fifth-round pick went to the Winnipeg Jets as the result of a trade on February 6, 1984 that sent Jimmy Mann to Quebec in exchange for this pick.
3. The Washington Capitals' fifth-round pick went to the Chicago Black Hawks as the result of a trade on August 24, 1982 that sent Ted Bulley and Dave Hutchison to Washington in exchange for Washington's 6th-rd pick in 1983 NHL entry draft and this pick.

=== Round six ===
#	Player	Nationality	NHL team	College/junior/club team
106	Emanuel Viveiros (D)	Canada	Edmonton Oilers (from Pittsburgh)^{1}	Prince Albert Raiders (WHL)
107	Kirk McLean (G)	Canada	New Jersey Devils	Oshawa Generals (OHL)
108	Greg Strome (G)	Canada	Los Angeles Kings	University of North Dakota (WCHA)
109	Fabian Joseph (C)	Canada	Toronto Maple Leafs	Victoria Cougars (WHL)
110	Mike Millar (RW)	Canada	Hartford Whalers	Brantford Alexanders (OHL)
111	Chris Clifford (G)	Canada	Chicago Black Hawks	Kingston Canadians (OHL)
112	Randy Hansch (G)	Canada	Detroit Red Wings	Victoria Cougars (WHL)
113	Steve Tuttle (RW)	Canada	St. Louis Blues	Richmond Sockeyes (BCJHL)
114	Gary Lorden (D)	United States	Winnipeg Jets	Bishop Hendricken High School (USHS-RI)
115	Jeff Korchinski (D)	Canada	Vancouver Canucks	Clarkson College (ECAC)
116	Jim Nesich (RW)	United States	Montreal Canadiens	Verdun Juniors (QMJHL)
117	Brett Hull (RW)	United States/Canada	Calgary Flames	Penticton Knights (BCJHL)
118	Gary McColgan (LW)	Canada	Minnesota North Stars	Oshawa Generals (OHL)
119	Kjell Samuelsson (D)	Sweden	New York Rangers	Leksands IF (Sweden)
120	Darren Cota (RW)	Canada	Quebec Nordiques	Kelowna Wings (WHL)
121	John Dzikowski (C)	Canada	Philadelphia Flyers	Brandon Wheat Kings (WHL)
122	Vito Cramarossa (RW)	Canada	Washington Capitals	Toronto Marlboros (OHL)
123	James Gasseau (D)	Canada	Buffalo Sabres	Drummondville Voltigeurs (QMJHL)
124	Randy Oswald (D)	Canada	Boston Bruins	Michigan Technological University (WCHA)
125	Jim Wilharm (D)	United States	New York Islanders	Minnetonka High School (USHS-MN)
126	Ivan Dornic (LW)	Czechoslovakia	Edmonton Oilers	Dukla Trenčín (Czechoslovakia)

1. The Pittsburgh Penguins' sixth-round pick went to the Edmonton Oilers as the result of a trade on December 5, 1983 that sent Tom Roulston to Pittsburgh in exchange for Kevin McClelland and this pick.

=== Round seven ===
#	Player	Nationality	NHL team	College/junior/club team
127	Tom Ryan (D)	United States	Pittsburgh Penguins	Newton North High School (USHS-MA)
128	Ian Ferguson (D)	United States	New Jersey Devils	Oshawa Generals (OHL)
129	Timothy Hanley (C)	United States	Los Angeles Kings	Deerfield Academy (USHS-MA)
130	Joseph MacInnis (C)	United States	Toronto Maple Leafs	Watertown High School (USHS-MA)
131	Mike Vellucci (D)	United States	Hartford Whalers	Belleville Bulls (OHL)
132	Mike Stapleton (C)	Canada	Chicago Black Hawks	Cornwall Royals (OHL)
133	Stefan Larsson (D)	Sweden	Detroit Red Wings	Frölunda (Sweden)
134	Cliff Ronning (C)	Canada	St. Louis Blues	New Westminster Bruins (WHL)
135	Luciano Borsato (C)	Canada	Winnipeg Jets	Bramalea Blues (MetJHL)
136	Blaine Chrest (C)	Canada	Vancouver Canucks	Portland Winter Hawks (WHL)
137	Scott MacTavish (D)	Canada	Montreal Canadiens	Fredericton High School (Canadian HS-NB)
138	Kevan Melrose (D)	Canada	Calgary Flames	Red Deer Rustlers (AJHL)
139	Vladimir Kyhos (LW)	Czechoslovakia	Minnesota North Stars	CHZ Litvinov (Czechoslovakia)
140	Thomas Hussey (LW)	Canada	New York Rangers	St. Andrew's College (Canadian HS-ON)
141	Henrik Cedergren (RW)	Sweden	Quebec Nordiques	Brynäs IF Gävle (Sweden)
142	Tom Allen (D)	Canada	Philadelphia Flyers	Kitchener Rangers (OHL)
143	Timo Iljina (C)	Finland	Washington Capitals	Kärpät (Finland)
144	Darcy Wakaluk (G)	Canada	Buffalo Sabres	Kelowna Wings (WHL)
145	Mark Thietke (C)	Canada	Boston Bruins	Saskatoon Blades (WHL)
146	Kelly Murphy (D)	Canada	New York Islanders	Notre Dame Hounds (SJHL)
147	Heikki Riihijarvi (D)	Finland	Edmonton Oilers	Kiekko-Espoo (Finland)

=== Round eight ===
#	Player	Nationality	NHL team	College/junior/club team
148	Don Porter (LW)	Canada	St. Louis Blues (from Pittsburgh)^{1}	Michigan Technological University (WCHA)
149	Vladimir Kames (C)	Czechoslovakia	New Jersey Devils	HC Dukla Jihlava (Czechoslovakia)
150	Shannon Deegan (C)	Canada	Los Angeles Kings	University of Vermont (ECAC)
151	Derek Laxdal (RW)	Canada	Toronto Maple Leafs	Brandon Wheat Kings (WHL)
152	Lars Karlsson (LW)	Sweden	Detroit Red Wings (from Hartford)^{2}	Färjestad BK (Sweden)
153	Glenn Greenough (RW)	Canada	Chicago Black Hawks	Sudbury Wolves (OHL)
154	Urban Nordin (C)	Sweden	Detroit Red Wings	Modo Hockey (Sweden)
155	Jim Vesey (C)	United States	St. Louis Blues	Columbus High School (USHS-MA)
156	Brad Jones (C)	United States	Winnipeg Jets	University of Michigan (CCHA)
157	Jim Agnew (D)	Canada	Vancouver Canucks	Brandon Wheat Kings (WHL)
158	Brad McCaughey (RW)	United States	Montreal Canadiens	Ann Arbor High School (USHS-MI)
159	Jiri Hrdina (C)	Czechoslovakia	Calgary Flames	HC Sparta Praha (Czechoslovakia)
160	Darin MacInnis (G)	United States	Minnesota North Stars	Kent School (USHS-CT)
161	Brian Nelson (C)	United States	New York Rangers	Willmar High School (USHS-MN)
162	Jyrki Mäki (D)	Finland	Quebec Nordiques	Simley High School (USHS-MN)
163	Luke Vitale (C)	Canada	Philadelphia Flyers	Henry Carr Crusaders (MetJHL)
164	Frank Joo (D)	Canada	Washington Capitals	Regina Pats (WHL)
165	Orvar Stambert (D)	Sweden	Buffalo Sabres	Djurgårdens IF Hockey (Sweden)
166	Don Sweeney (D)	Canada	Boston Bruins	St. Paul's School (USHS-NH)
167	Franco DeSantis (D)	Canada	New York Islanders	Verdun Juniors (QMJHL)
168	Todd Ewen (RW)	Canada	Edmonton Oilers	New Westminster Bruins (WHL)

1. The Pittsburgh Penguins' eighth-round pick went to the St. Louis Blues as the result of a trade on February 14, 1981 that had Pittsburgh right to claim Gary Edwards off waivers from Blues without having to pay a cash waiver price in exchange for this pick.
2. The Hartford Whalers' eighth-round pick went to the Detroit Red Wings as the result of a trade on May 29, 1984 that sent Brad Shaw in exchange for this pick.

=== Round nine ===
#	Player	Nationality	NHL team	College/junior/club team
169	John Del Col (LW)	Canada	Pittsburgh Penguins	Toronto Marlboros (OHL)
170	Mike Roth (D)	United States	New Jersey Devils	Hill-Murray High School (USHS-MN)
171	Luc Robitaille (LW)	Canada	Los Angeles Kings	Hull Olympiques (QMJHL)
172	Dan Turner (LW)	Canada	Toronto Maple Leafs	Medicine Hat Tigers (WHL)
173	John Devereaux (C)	United States	Hartford Whalers	Scituate High School (USHS-MA)
174	Ralph DiFiore (D)	Canada	Chicago Black Hawks	Shawinigan Cataractes (QMJHL)
175	Bill Shibicky (C)	Canada	Detroit Red Wings	Michigan State University (CCHA)
176	Daniel Jomphe (LW)	Canada	St. Louis Blues	Granby Bisons (QMJHL)
177	Gord Whitaker (RW)	Canada	Winnipeg Jets	Colorado College (WCHA)
178	Rex Grant (G)	Canada	Vancouver Canucks	Kamloops Jr. Oilers (WHL)
179	Eric Demers (LW)	Canada	Montreal Canadiens	Shawinigan Cataractes (QMJHL)
180	Gary Suter (D)	United States	Calgary Flames	University of Wisconsin–Madison (WCHA)
181	Duane Wahlin (RW)	United States	Minnesota North Stars	Johnson High School (USHS-MN)
182	Ville Kentala (LW)	Finland	New York Rangers	HIFK (Finland)
183	Guy Ouellette (C)	Canada	Quebec Nordiques	Quebec Remparts (QMJHL)
184	Billy Powers (C)	United States	Philadelphia Flyers	Matignon High School (USHS-MA)
185	Jim Thomson (RW)	Canada	Washington Capitals	Toronto Marlboros (OHL)
–	Invalid claim (Note: The Buffalo Sabres called the name of Eric Weinrich with the 186th pick. Weinrich, however, was born later than the cutoff date of September 15, 1966, and was therefore ineligible for the 1984 draft.)		Buffalo Sabres	
186	Kevin Heffernan (C)	United States	Boston Bruins	Weymouth High School (USHS-MA)
187	Tom Warden (D)	Canada	New York Islanders	North Bay Centennials (OHL)
188	Heinz Ehlers (C)	Denmark	New York Rangers (from Edmonton)^{1}	Leksands IF (Sweden)

1. The Edmonton Oilers' ninth-round pick went to the New York Rangers as the result of a trade on January 20, 1984 that sent Rick Chartraw to Edmonton in exchange for this pick.

=== Round ten ===
#	Player	Nationality	NHL team	College/junior/club team
189	Steve Hurt (RW)	United States	Pittsburgh Penguins	Hill-Murray High School (USHS-MN)
190	Mike Peluso (D)	United States	New Jersey Devils	Greenway High School (USHS-MN)
191	Jeff Crossman (C)	Canada	Los Angeles Kings	Western Michigan University (CCHA)
192	David Buckley (D)	United States	Toronto Maple Leafs	Trinity-Pawling School (USHS-NY)
193	Brent Regan (LW)	Canada	Hartford Whalers	St. Albert Saints (AJHL)
194	Joakim Pehrson (LW)	Sweden	Chicago Black Hawks	Brynäs IF (Sweden)
195	Jay Rose (D)	United States	Detroit Red Wings	New Preparatory School (USHS-MA)
196	Tom Tilley (D)	Canada	St. Louis Blues	Orillia Travelways (OPJHL)
197	Rick Forst (LW)	Canada	Winnipeg Jets	Melville Millionaires (SJHL)
198	Ed Lowney (RW)	United States	Vancouver Canucks	Boston University (ECAC)
199	Ron Annear (D)	Canada	Montreal Canadiens	American International College (Atlantic Hockey)
200	Petr Rucka (C)	Czechoslovakia	Calgary Flames	HC Sparta Praha (Czechoslovakia)
201	Michael Orn (C)	United States	Minnesota North Stars	Stillwater High School (USHS-MN)
202	Kevin Miller (C)	United States	New York Rangers	Redford Royals (NAHL)
203	Ken Quinney (RW)	Canada	Quebec Nordiques	Calgary Wranglers (WHL)
204	Daryn Fersovich (C)	Canada	Philadelphia Flyers	St. Albert Saints (AJHL)
205	Paul Cavallini (D)	Canada	Washington Capitals	Henry Carr Crusaders (MetJHL)
206	Brian McKinnon (C)	Canada	Buffalo Sabres	Ottawa 67's (OHL)
207	J. D. Urbanic (LW)	Canada	Boston Bruins	Windsor Spitfires (OHL)
208	David Volek (RW)	Czechoslovakia	New York Islanders	HC Slavia Praha (Czechoslovakia)
209	Joel Curtis (LW)	Canada	Edmonton Oilers	Oshawa Generals (OHL)

=== Round eleven ===
#	Player	Nationality	NHL team	College/junior/club team
210	Jim Steen (C)	United States	Pittsburgh Penguins	Moorhead High School (USHS-MN)
211	Jarkko Piiparinen (LW)	Finland	New Jersey Devils	Kiekko-Reipas (Finland)
212	Paul Kenny (G)	Canada	Los Angeles Kings	Cornwall Royals (OHL)
213	Mike Wurst (LW)	United States	Toronto Maple Leafs	Ohio State University (CCHA)
214	Jim Culhane (D)	Canada	Hartford Whalers	Western Michigan University (CCHA)
215	Bill Brown (C)	United States	Chicago Black Hawks	Simley High School (USHS-MN)
216	Tim Kaiser (RW)	Canada	Detroit Red Wings	Guelph Platers (OHL)
217	Mark Cupolo (LW)	Canada	St. Louis Blues	Guelph Platers (OHL)
218	Mike Warus (RW)	Canada	Winnipeg Jets	Lake Superior State University (CCHA)
219	Doug Clarke (D)	Canada	Vancouver Canucks	Colorado College (WCHA)
220	Dave Tanner (D)	Canada	Montreal Canadiens	Notre Dame Hounds (SJHL)
221	Stefan Jonsson (D)	Sweden	Calgary Flames	Södertälje SK (Sweden)
222	Tom Terwilliger (D)	United States	Minnesota North Stars	Edina High School (USHS-MN)
223	Tom Lorentz (C)	United States	New York Rangers	Brady High School (USHS-MN)
224	David Mackey (LW)	Canada	Chicago Black Hawks (from Quebec)^{1}	Victoria Cougars (WHL)
–	Invalid claim (Note: The Philadelphia Flyers attempted to select Petr Rucka with the 225th overall pick, but Rucka had already been drafted by the Calgary Flames with the 200th overall pick.)		Philadelphia Flyers	
225	Mikhail Tatarinov (D)	Soviet Union	Washington Capitals	Sokil Kyiv (USSR)
226	Grant Delcourt (RW)	Canada	Buffalo Sabres	Kelowna Wings (WHL)
227	Bill Kopecky (C)	United States	Boston Bruins	Austin Preparatory School (USHS-MA)
228	Russ Becker (D)	United States	New York Islanders	Virginia High School (USHS-MN)
229	Simon Wheeldon (C)	Canada	Edmonton Oilers	Victoria Cougars (WHL)
^{Reference: "1984 NHL Entry Draft hockeydraftcentral.com".}

1. The Quebec Nordiques' eleventh-round pick went to the Chicago Black Hawks as the result of a trade on June 8, 1983 that sent Chicago's twelfth-round pick in 1983 NHL entry draft to Quebec in exchange for this pick.

=== Round twelve ===
#	Player	Nationality	NHL team	College/junior/club team
230	Mark Ziliotto (C)	Canada	Pittsburgh Penguins	Streetsville Derbys (CJBHL)
231	Chris Kiene (D)	United States	New Jersey Devils	Springfield Olympics (NEJHL)
232	Brian Martin (LW)	Canada	Los Angeles Kings	Belleville Bulls (OHL)
233	Peter Slanina (D)	Czechoslovakia	Toronto Maple Leafs	VSZ Košice (Czechoslovakia)
234	Peter Abric (G)	Canada	Hartford Whalers	North Bay Centennials (OHL)
235	Dan Williams (D)	United States	Chicago Black Hawks	Oak Park High School (USHS-IL)
236	Tom Nickolau (C)	Canada	Detroit Red Wings	Guelph Platers (OHL)
237	Mark Lanigan (D)	United States	St. Louis Blues	Waterloo Blackhawks (USHL)
238	Jim Edmands (G)	Canada	Winnipeg Jets	Cornell University (ECAC)
239	Ed Kister (D)	Canada	Vancouver Canucks	London Knights (OHL)
240	Troy Crosby (G)	Canada	Montreal Canadiens	Verdun Juniors (QMJHL)
241	Rudolf Suchanek (D)	Czechoslovakia	Calgary Flames	Motor-České Budějovice (Czechoslovakia)
242	Mike Nightengale (D)	United States	Minnesota North Stars	Simley High School (USHS-MN)
243	Scott Brower (G)	Canada	New York Rangers	Lloydminster Bobcats (AJHL)
244	Peter Loob (D)	Sweden	Quebec Nordiques	Södertälje SK (Sweden)
245	Juraj Bakos (D)	Czechoslovakia	Philadelphia Flyers	VSZ Košice (Czechoslovakia)
246	Per Schederin (D)	Sweden	Washington Capitals	Brynäs IF (Sweden)
247	Sean Baker (LW)	United States	Buffalo Sabres	Seattle Breakers (WHL)
248	Jim Newhouse (LW)	United States	Boston Bruins	Matignon High School (USHS-MA)
249	Allister Brown (D)	Canada	New York Islanders	University of New Hampshire (ECAC)
250	Darren Gani (D)	Canada	Edmonton Oilers	Belleville Bulls (OHL)
^{Reference: "1984 NHL Entry Draft hockeydraftcentral.com".}

= NHL All-Star team ·	= NHL All-Star ·	= NHL All-Star and NHL All-Star team ·	= Hall of Famers

== Draftees based on nationality ==
Rank	Country	Amount
	North America	211
1	Canada	149
2	United States	62
	Europe	39
3	Czechoslovakia	14
4	Sweden	13
5	Finland	10
6	Denmark	1
6	Soviet Union	1

== See also ==
- 1984–85 NHL season
- List of NHL players
