= 1984–85 NHL season =

National Hockey League season

- League: National Hockey League
- Sport: Ice hockey
- Duration: October 11, 1984 – May 30, 1985
- Games: 80
- Teams: 21
- TV partner(s): CBC, CTV, SRC (Canada); USA (United States)

Draft
- Top draft pick: Mario Lemieux
- Picked by: Pittsburgh Penguins

Regular season
- Season champions: Philadelphia Flyers
- Season MVP: Wayne Gretzky (Oilers)
- Top scorer: Wayne Gretzky (Oilers)

Playoffs
- Playoffs MVP: Wayne Gretzky (Oilers)

Stanley Cup
- Champions: Edmonton Oilers
- Runners-up: Philadelphia Flyers

NHL seasons
- 1983–84 1985–86

The 1984–85 NHL season was the 68th season of the National Hockey League. The Edmonton Oilers won their second straight Stanley Cup by beating the Philadelphia Flyers four games to one in the final series.

== League business ==
=== Entry draft ===
The 1984 NHL entry draft was held on June 9, at the Montreal Forum in Montreal, Quebec. Mario Lemieux was selected first overall by the Pittsburgh Penguins.

=== Ice officials begin wearing helmets ===
Referee Andy Van Hellemond becomes the first on ice official in league history to wear a helmet. Soon, several officials would follow his lead and wear helmets before it became mandatory for all officials for the 2006–07 season.

== Regular season ==
The Philadelphia Flyers had the best record in the NHL, four points ahead of second place Edmonton Oilers. Flyers goaltender Pelle Lindbergh went on to become the first European to win the Vezina Trophy. Oilers' star Wayne Gretzky once again won the Art Ross Trophy by reaching the 200 point plateau for the third time in four years. He also set a new record for assists in a season with 135 and won his sixth straight Hart Memorial Trophy. Mario Lemieux made his NHL debut by scoring 100 points and winning the Calder Trophy for rookie of the year. On October 26, 1984, Paul Coffey of the Edmonton Oilers would be the last defenceman in the 20th century to score four goals in one game. It occurred in a game versus the Detroit Red Wings.

The last two players active in the 1960s, Butch Goring and Brad Park, retired after the playoffs. Goring was the last active, playing his last playoff game three days after Park's last game.

=== Final standings ===
Note: W = Wins, L = Losses, T = Ties, GF= Goals For, GA = Goals Against, Pts = Points, PIM = Penalties in minutes. Teams qualifying for the playoffs shown in bold.

==== Prince of Wales Conference ====
Adams Division
	GP	W	L	T	GF	GA	Pts
**Montreal Canadiens**	80	41	27	12	309	262	94
**Quebec Nordiques**	80	41	30	9	323	275	91
**Buffalo Sabres**	80	38	28	14	290	237	90
**Boston Bruins**	80	36	34	10	303	287	82
Hartford Whalers	80	30	41	9	268	318	69

Patrick Division
	GP	W	L	T	GF	GA	Pts
**Philadelphia Flyers**	80	53	20	7	348	241	113
**Washington Capitals**	80	46	25	9	322	240	101
**New York Islanders**	80	40	34	6	345	312	86
**New York Rangers**	80	26	44	10	295	345	62
New Jersey Devils	80	22	48	10	264	346	54
Pittsburgh Penguins	80	24	51	5	276	385	53

==== Clarence Campbell Conference ====
Norris Division
	GP	W	L	T	GF	GA	Pts
**St. Louis Blues**	80	37	31	12	299	288	86
**Chicago Black Hawks**	80	38	35	7	309	299	83
**Detroit Red Wings**	80	27	41	12	313	357	66
**Minnesota North Stars**	80	25	43	12	268	321	62
Toronto Maple Leafs	80	20	52	8	253	358	48

Smythe Division
	GP	W	L	T	GF	GA	Pts
**Edmonton Oilers**	80	49	20	11	401	298	109
**Winnipeg Jets**	80	43	27	10	358	332	96
**Calgary Flames**	80	41	27	12	363	302	94
**Los Angeles Kings**	80	34	32	14	339	326	82
Vancouver Canucks	80	25	46	9	284	401	59

== Playoffs ==
=== Bracket ===
The top four teams in each division qualified for the playoffs. In the division semifinals, the fourth seeded team in each division played against the division winner from their division. The other series matched the second and third place teams from the divisions. The two winning teams from each division's semifinals then met in the division finals. The two division winners of each conference then played in the conference finals. The two conference winners then advanced to the Stanley Cup Final.

In the division semifinals, teams competed in a best-of-five series. In the other three rounds, teams competed in a best-of-seven series (scores in the bracket indicate the number of games won in each series).

Division semifinals	Division finals
A1	Montreal	3
A4	Boston	2
A1	Montreal	3
A2	Quebec	4
A2	Quebec	3
A3	Buffalo	2
Prince of Wales Conference
P1	Philadelphia	3
P4	NY Rangers	0
P1	Philadelphia	4
P3	NY Islanders	1
P2	Washington	2
P3	NY Islanders	3
N1	St. Louis	0
N4	Minnesota	3
N4	Minnesota	2
N2	Chicago	4
N2	Chicago	3
N3	Detroit	0
Clarence Campbell Conference
S1	Edmonton	3
S4	Los Angeles	0
S1	Edmonton	4
S2	Winnipeg	0
S2	Winnipeg	3
S3	Calgary	1

Conference finals
A2	Quebec	2
P1	Philadelphia	4
N2	Chicago	2
S1	Edmonton	4

Stanley Cup Final
P1	Philadelphia	1
S1	Edmonton	4

== Awards ==
1985 NHL awards
Prince of Wales Trophy: (Wales Conference playoff champion)	Philadelphia Flyers
Clarence S. Campbell Bowl: (Campbell Conference playoff champion)	Edmonton Oilers
Art Ross Trophy: (Top scorer, regular season)	Wayne Gretzky, Edmonton Oilers
Bill Masterton Memorial Trophy: (Perseverance, sportsmanship, and dedication)	Anders Hedberg, New York Rangers
Calder Memorial Trophy: (Best first-year player)	Mario Lemieux, Pittsburgh Penguins
Conn Smythe Trophy: (Most valuable player, playoffs)	Wayne Gretzky, Edmonton Oilers
Frank J. Selke Trophy: (Best defensive forward)	Craig Ramsay, Buffalo Sabres
Hart Memorial Trophy: (Most valuable player, regular season)	Wayne Gretzky, Edmonton Oilers
Jack Adams Award: (Best coach)	Mike Keenan, Philadelphia Flyers
James Norris Memorial Trophy: (Best defenceman)	Paul Coffey, Edmonton Oilers
Lady Byng Memorial Trophy: (Excellence and sportsmanship)	Jari Kurri, Edmonton Oilers
Lester B. Pearson Award: (Outstanding player, regular season)	Wayne Gretzky, Edmonton Oilers
NHL Plus/Minus Award: (Player with best plus/minus record)	Wayne Gretzky, Edmonton Oilers
William M. Jennings Trophy: (Goaltender(s) of team(s) with best goaltending record)	Tom Barrasso/Bob Sauve, Buffalo Sabres
Vezina Trophy: (Best goaltender)	Pelle Lindbergh, Philadelphia Flyers

=== All-Star teams ===
First team	Position	Second team
Pelle Lindbergh, Philadelphia Flyers	Goaltender	Tom Barrasso, Buffalo Sabres
Paul Coffey, Edmonton Oilers	Defence	Rod Langway, Washington Capitals
Ray Bourque, Boston Bruins	Defence	Doug Wilson, Chicago Black Hawks
Wayne Gretzky, Edmonton Oilers	Centre	Dale Hawerchuk, Winnipeg Jets
Jari Kurri, Edmonton Oilers	Right wing	Mike Bossy, New York Islanders
John Ogrodnick, Detroit Red Wings	Left wing	John Tonelli, New York Islanders

== Player statistics ==
=== Scoring leaders ===
Note: GP = Games played; G = Goals; A = Assists; Pts = Points

Player	Team	GP	G	A	Pts	PIM
Wayne Gretzky	Edmonton Oilers	80	73	135	208	52
Jari Kurri	Edmonton Oilers	73	71	64	135	30
Dale Hawerchuk	Winnipeg Jets	80	53	77	130	74
Marcel Dionne	Los Angeles Kings	80	46	80	126	46
Paul Coffey	Edmonton Oilers	80	37	84	121	97
Mike Bossy	New York Islanders	76	58	59	117	38
John Ogrodnick	Detroit Red Wings	79	55	50	105	30
Denis Savard	Chicago Black Hawks	79	38	67	105	56
Bernie Federko	St. Louis Blues	76	30	73	103	27
Mike Gartner	Washington Capitals	80	50	52	102	71

Source: NHL.

=== Leading goaltenders ===
Note: GP = Games played; W = Won; L = Lost; T = Tied; GA = Goals allowed; GAA = Goals against average; SO = Shutouts; SV% = Save percentage

Player	Team	GP	W	L	T	GA	GAA	SO	SV%
Tom Barrasso	Buffalo Sabres	54	25	18	10	144	2.66	5	.887
Pat Riggin	Washington Capitals	57	28	20	7	168	2.98	2	.886
Pelle Lindbergh	Philadelphia Flyers	65	40	17	7	194	3.02	2	.899
Steve Penney	Montreal Canadiens	54	26	18	8	167	3.08	1	.876
Rick Wamsley	St. Louis Blues	40	23	12	5	126	3.26	0	.885
Mario Gosselin	Quebec Nordiques	36	19	11	3	111	3.30	1	.877
Rejean Lemelin	Calgary Flames	56	30	12	10	183	3.46	1	.888
Pete Peeters	Boston Bruins	51	19	26	4	172	3.47	1	.868
Dan Bouchard	Quebec Nordiques	29	12	13	4	101	3.49	0	.877
Kelly Hrudey	New York Islanders	41	19	17	3	141	3.62	2	.886

== Coaches ==
=== Patrick Division ===
- New Jersey Devils: Doug Carpenter
- New York Islanders: Al Arbour
- New York Rangers: Herb Brooks and Craig Patrick
- Philadelphia Flyers: Mike Keenan
- Pittsburgh Penguins: Bob Berry
- Washington Capitals: Bryan Murray

=== Adams Division ===
- Boston Bruins: Gerry Cheevers and Harry Sinden
- Buffalo Sabres: Scotty Bowman
- Hartford Whalers: Jack Evans
- Montreal Canadiens: Jacques Lemaire
- Quebec Nordiques: Michel Bergeron

=== Norris Division ===
- Chicago Black Hawks: Orval Tessier and Bob Pulford
- Detroit Red Wings: Nick Polano
- Minnesota North Stars: Glen Sonmor
- St. Louis Blues: Jacques Demers
- Toronto Maple Leafs: Dan Maloney

=== Smythe Division ===
- Calgary Flames: Bob Johnson
- Edmonton Oilers: Glen Sather
- Los Angeles Kings: Pat Quinn
- Vancouver Canucks: Bill LaForge and Harry Neale
- Winnipeg Jets: Barry Long

== Milestones ==
=== Debuts ===
The following is a list of players of note who played their first NHL game in 1984–85 (listed with their first team, asterisk(*) marks debut in playoffs):

- Gino Cavallini, Calgary Flames
- Joel Otto, Calgary Flames
- Ed Olczyk, Chicago Black Hawks
- Marc Bergevin, Chicago Black Hawks
- Gerard Gallant, Detroit Red Wings
- Esa Tikkanen*, Edmonton Oilers
- Steve Smith, Edmonton Oilers
- Kevin Dineen, Hartford Whalers
- Ray Ferraro, Hartford Whalers
- Sylvain Cote, Hartford Whalers
- Ulf Samuelsson, Hartford Whalers
- Garry Galley, Los Angeles Kings
- Patrick Roy, Montreal Canadiens
- Petr Svoboda, Montreal Canadiens
- Stephane Richer, Montreal Canadiens
- Greg Adams, New Jersey Devils
- Kirk Muller, New Jersey Devils
- Dave Gagner, New York Rangers
- Grant Ledyard, New York Rangers
- Kelly Miller, New York Rangers
- Tomas Sandstrom, New York Rangers
- Rick Tocchet, Philadelphia Flyers
- Doug Bodger, Pittsburgh Penguins
- Mario Lemieux, Pittsburgh Penguins
- Steve Thomas, Toronto Maple Leafs
- Todd Gill, Toronto Maple Leafs
- Al Iafrate, Toronto Maple Leafs
- Petri Skriko, Vancouver Canucks
- Kevin Hatcher, Washington Capitals
- Dave Ellett, Winnipeg Jets

=== Last games ===
The following is a list of players of note that played their last game in the NHL in 1984–85 (listed with their last team):

- Terry O'Reilly, Boston Bruins
- Butch Goring, Boston Bruins
- Craig Ramsay, Buffalo Sabres
- Jerry Korab, Buffalo Sabres
- Jim Schoenfeld, Buffalo Sabres
- Real Cloutier, Buffalo Sabres
- Bob MacMillan, Chicago Black Hawks
- Brad Park, Detroit Red Wings
- Colin Campbell, Detroit Red Wings
- Darryl Sittler, Detroit Red Wings
- Ivan Boldirev, Detroit Red Wings
- Steve Shutt, Los Angeles Kings
- Paul Holmgren, Minnesota North Stars
- Pierre Mondou, Montreal Canadiens
- Anders Hedberg, New York Rangers
- Robbie Ftorek, New York Rangers
- Rick Kehoe, Pittsburgh Penguins
- John Garrett, Vancouver Canucks

Note: Goring and Park were the last two players to have played in the NHL in the 1960s.

== Broadcasting ==
This was the first season in more than a decade that CBC was not the lone Canadian national broadcaster. While Molson continued to present Hockey Night in Canada on Saturday nights, rival brewery Carling O'Keefe began airing Friday night games on CTV. The two networks also split the playoffs and finals. CTV had previously aired HNIC-produced telecasts in the 1960s.

This was the third and final season of the league's U.S. national broadcast rights deal with USA, covering a slate of regular season games and selected playoff games. ESPN then signed a three-year agreement with the league after bidding about twice as much as USA had been paying. USA would not televise the NHL again until after the network was acquired by NBCUniversal in the early 2000s, airing selected playoff games as part of NBC Sports' overall NHL coverage between 2015 and 2021.

== See also ==
- List of Stanley Cup champions
- 1984 NHL entry draft
- 1984–85 NHL transactions
- 37th National Hockey League All-Star Game
- National Hockey League All-Star Game
- NHL All-Rookie Team
- 1984 Canada Cup
- 1984 in sports
- 1985 in sports
