= Darin Sceviour =

Canadian ice hockey player

- Born: November 30, 1965 (age 60) Lacombe, Alberta, Canada
- Height: 5 ft 10 in (178 cm)
- Weight: 185 lb (84 kg; 13 st 3 lb)
- Position: Right wing
- Shot: Right
- Played for: Chicago Blackhawks
- National team: Canada
- NHL draft: 101st overall, 1984; Chicago Black Hawks
- Playing career: 1985–1991

Darin Sceviour (born November 30, 1965) is a Canadian former professional ice hockey right winger. He played one game in the National Hockey League with the Chicago Blackhawks during the 1986–87 season, on February 1, 1987 against the Edmonton Oilers. The rest of his career, which lasted from 1985 to 1991, was spent in the minor leagues. Sceviour was born in Lacombe, Alberta.

== Career statistics ==
=== Regular season and playoffs ===
			Regular season					Playoffs
Season	Team	League	GP	G	A	Pts	PIM	GP	G	A	Pts	PIM
1981–82	Red Deer SE Chiefs	U16 AAA	64	55	67	122	87	—	—	—	—	—
1982–83	Lethbridge Broncos	WHL	64	9	17	26	45	17	8	0	8	9
1982–83	Lethbridge Broncos	M-Cup	—	—	—	—	—	1	0	0	0	0
1983–84	Lethbridge Broncos	WHL	71	37	28	65	28	5	2	2	4	0
1984–85	Lethbridge Broncos	WHL	67	39	36	75	37	4	2	2	4	0
1985–86	Saginaw Generals	IHL	24	9	11	20	7	11	8	5	13	5
1985–86	Nova Scotia Oilers	AHL	31	4	3	7	6	—	—	—	—	—
1986–87	Chicago Blackhawks	NHL	1	0	0	0	0	—	—	—	—	—
1986–87	Saginaw Generals	IHL	37	13	18	31	4	10	10	2	12	0
1986–87	Canadian National Team	Intl	5	2	0	2	17	—	—	—	—	—
1987–88	Duisburger SV	GER-2	19	41	38	79	—	19	35	34	69	—
1988–89	Neusser SC	GER-2	30	30	32	62	14	—	—	—	—	—
1989–90	EHC Essen-West	GER-2	36	40	49	89	30	13	14	19	33	10
1990–91	EHC Essen-West	GER-2	48	42	45	87	48	—	—	—	—	—
GER-2 totals			133	153	164	317	—	32	49	53	102	—
NHL totals			1	0	0	0	0	—	—	—	—	—

== See also ==
- List of players who played only one game in the NHL
