= Jim Nesich =

American ice hockey player

- Born: February 22, 1966 (age 60) Dearborn, MI, USA
- Height: 5 ft 11 in (180 cm)
- Weight: 185 lb (84 kg; 13 st 3 lb)
- Position: Center
- Shot: Right
- Played for: AHL; Sherbrooke Canadiens; Fredericton Canadiens; Cape Breton Oilers; Worcester IceCats; IHL; Kalamazoo Wings; Los Angeles Ice Dogs
- NHL draft: 116th overall, 1984; Montreal Canadiens
- Playing career: 1986–1996

Jim Nesich (born February 22, 1966) is a retired American professional ice hockey player. He has Slovene roots . He was selected by the Montreal Canadiens in the 10th round (116th overall) of the 1984 NHL entry draft.

== Career statistics ==
			Regular season					Playoffs
Season	Team	League	GP	G	A	Pts	PIM	GP	G	A	Pts	PIM
1983–84	Verdun Juniors	QMJHL	70	22	24	46	39	10	11	5	16	2
1984–85	Verdun Junior Canadiens	QMJHL	65	19	33	52	72	14	2	5	7	25
1985–86	Verdun Junior Canadiens	QMJHL	71	26	55	81	112	5	0	0	0	8
1985–86	Sherbrooke Canadiens	AHL	4	0	1	1	0	—	—	—	—	—
1986–87	Verdun Junior Canadiens	QMJHL	62	20	50	70	133	—	—	—	—	—
1987–88	Sherbrooke Canadiens	AHL	53	4	10	14	51	4	1	2	3	20
1988–89	Sherbrooke Canadiens	AHL	74	12	34	46	112	6	1	2	3	10
1989–90	Sherbrooke Canadiens	AHL	62	21	31	52	79	12	2	13	15	18
1990–91	Fredericton Canadiens	AHL	72	13	30	43	79	9	0	4	4	36
1991–92	Kalamazoo Wings	IHL	80	13	19	32	85	12	3	7	10	12
1992–93	HDD Olimpija Ljubljana	Slovenia	—	23	29	52	—	—	—	—	—	—
1993–94	Cape Breton Oilers	AHL	65	23	42	65	126	5	1	1	2	10
1994–95	Worcester IceCats	AHL	77	7	21	28	128	—	—	—	—	—
1995–96	Los Angeles Ice Dogs	IHL	45	0	12	12	75	—	—	—	—	—
AHL totals			407	80	169	249	575	36	5	22	27	94
IHL totals			125	13	31	44	160	12	3	7	10	12

== Awards and honors ==
Award	Year
Fred T. Hunt Memorial Award - AHL award for sportsmanship, determination and dedication to hockey	1993–94
