= Dave Hutchison (ice hockey) =

Canadian ice hockey player

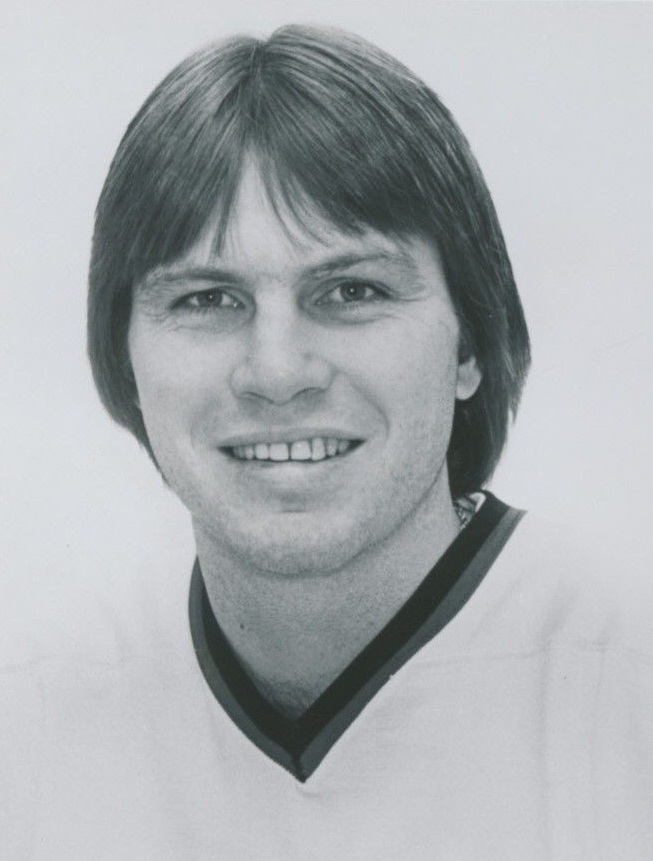
- Hutchison in 1979
- Born: May 2, 1952 (age 74) London, Ontario, Canada
- Height: 6 ft 3 in (191 cm)
- Weight: 205 lb (93 kg; 14 st 9 lb)
- Position: Defence
- Shot: Left
- Played for: Philadelphia Blazers; Vancouver Blazers; Los Angeles Kings; Toronto Maple Leafs; Chicago Black Hawks; New Jersey Devils
- NHL draft: 36th overall, 1972; Los Angeles Kings
- Playing career: 1972–1984

David Joseph Hutchison (born May 2, 1952) is a Canadian former professional ice hockey player. He played in the World Hockey Association from 1972 to 1974 and the National Hockey League from 1974 to 1984.

== Playing career ==
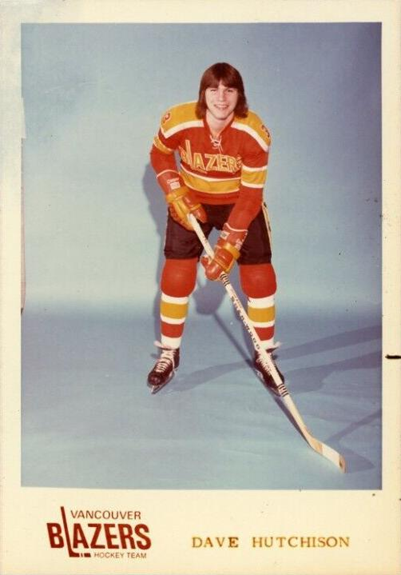
Hutchison in 1973 photo for Vancouver Blazers of the WHA

Hutchison played for the Philadelphia Blazers and Vancouver Blazers of the World Hockey Association and the Los Angeles Kings, Toronto Maple Leafs, Chicago Black Hawks and New Jersey Devils of the National Hockey League. In 681 career professional games, he logged 1735 penalty minutes and 131 points, and often played in a defensive tandem with Börje Salming and Doug Wilson. He retired in 1984.

== Career statistics ==
=== Regular season and playoffs ===
			Regular season					Playoffs
Season	Team	League	GP	G	A	Pts	PIM	GP	G	A	Pts	PIM
1969–70	London Squires	WOHL	7	1	2	3	30	12	0	4	4	60
1970–71	London Knights	OHA	54	2	13	15	154	—	—	—	—	—
1971–72	London Knights	OHA	46	3	11	14	151	3	0	1	1	15
1972–73	Philadelphia Blazers	WHA	28	0	2	2	34	3	0	0	0	0
1972–73	Rhode Island Eagles	EHL	32	7	18	25	158	—	—	—	—	—
1973–74	Vancouver Blazers	WHA	69	0	13	13	151	—	—	—	—	—
1974–75	Los Angeles Kings	NHL	68	0	6	6	133	2	0	0	0	22
1975–76	Los Angeles Kings	NHL	50	0	10	10	181	9	0	3	3	29
1976–77	Los Angeles Kings	NHL	70	6	11	17	220	9	1	4	5	17
1977–78	Los Angeles Kings	NHL	44	0	10	10	71	—	—	—	—	—
1978–79	Toronto Maple Leafs	NHL	79	4	15	19	235	6	0	3	3	23
1979–80	Toronto Maple Leafs	NHL	31	1	6	7	28	—	—	—	—	—
1979–80	Chicago Black Hawks	NHL	38	0	5	5	73	6	0	0	0	12
1980–81	Chicago Black Hawks	NHL	59	2	9	11	124	2	0	0	0	2
1981–82	Chicago Black Hawks	NHL	66	5	18	23	246	14	1	2	3	44
1982–83	New Jersey Devils	NHL	32	1	4	5	102	—	—	—	—	—
1982–83	Wichita Wind	CHL	2	0	0	0	0	—	—	—	—	—
1983–84	Toronto Maple Leafs	NHL	47	0	3	3	137	—	—	—	—	—
WHA totals			97	0	15	15	185	3	0	0	0	0
NHL totals			584	19	97	116	1,550	48	2	12	14	149
