= 1991–92 NHL season =

National Hockey League season

- The NHL 75th anniversary logo
- League: National Hockey League
- Sport: Ice hockey
- Duration: October 3, 1991 – June 1, 1992
- Games: 80
- Teams: 22
- TV partner(s): CBC, TSN, SRC (Canada); SportsChannel America, NBC (Note: NBC only televised the All-Star Game.) (United States)

Draft
- Top draft pick: Eric Lindros
- Picked by: Quebec Nordiques

Regular season
- Presidents' Trophy: New York Rangers
- Season MVP: Mark Messier (Rangers)
- Top scorer: Mario Lemieux (Penguins)

Playoffs
- Playoffs MVP: Mario Lemieux (Penguins)

Stanley Cup
- Champions: Pittsburgh Penguins
- Runners-up: Chicago Blackhawks

NHL seasons
- 1990–91 1992–93

The 1991–92 NHL season was the 75th regular season of the National Hockey League. The league expanded to 22 teams with the addition of the expansion San Jose Sharks. A ten-day players' strike was called in April, delaying the final weeks of the regular season and the playoffs, and pushing the Stanley Cup Final into June for the first time. The Pittsburgh Penguins repeated as Stanley Cup champions, winning the best of seven series four games to none against the Chicago Blackhawks.

== League business ==
=== Expansion ===
This was the first season for the San Jose Sharks, the first expansion team in the NHL since 1979. The birth of the Sharks returned NHL hockey to the San Francisco Bay Area after the California Golden Seals had relocated to Cleveland, Ohio in 1976 to become the Cleveland Barons. The Sharks were the result of a compromise between the league and George and Gordon Gund, the owners of the Minnesota North Stars. The two brothers had previously owned the Seals/Barons before the team merged with the North Stars. In 1990, as a result of slipping attendance, the Gunds petitioned the NHL for permission to relocate the North Stars to the San Francisco Bay Area. Instead, the league granted the brothers a new expansion team, and the Gunds sold the North Stars.

The 1991 NHL dispersal and expansion drafts were then held on May 30, 1991. The Sharks first selected 16 players from a pool of North Stars players. Then the Sharks and North Stars took turns selecting ten players each from a pool of players from the other NHL teams.

=== Entry draft ===
The 1991 NHL entry draft was held on June 22 at the Memorial Auditorium in Buffalo, New York. Eric Lindros was selected first overall by the Quebec Nordiques. However, Lindros immediately refused to sign a contract with the Nordiques, eventually leading to one of the biggest trades in NHL history on June 30, 1992, sending him to the Philadelphia Flyers.

=== Rule changes ===
A new rule was added in which the final minute of every period is measured in tenths of a second, unlike whole seconds as in past seasons. This timekeeping procedure had previously been added to IIHF rules in 1990 (although the scoreboard at St. Louis Arena was not capable of measuring the final minute in tenths of a second until the following season; the Blues were given an exemption since their new arena was under construction; it opened in 1994.).

=== 75th season celebration ===
To celebrate the 75th anniversary season for the NHL, all players wore a special anniversary patch on their uniforms during this season.

Taking cues from Major League Baseball's "Turn Back The Clock" uniform program, throwback uniforms were worn by Original Six teams for select games, and throwbacks were also worn for the All-Star Game.

The uniform styles that were worn include:

- Boston Bruins – c. 1933
- Chicago Blackhawks – c. 1940
- Detroit Red Wings – c. 1928
- Montreal Canadiens – c. 1926
- New York Rangers – c. 1940
- Toronto Maple Leafs – c. 1940
- Wales All-Stars – white All-Star jersey c. 1952
- Campbell All-Stars – red All-Star jersey c. 1952

The throwback uniforms would influence future seasons in the NHL, as several teams adopted throwbacks as alternate jerseys. The National Football League and National Basketball Association would follow the NHL's lead, with teams wearing throwbacks to celebrate their leagues' 75th and 50th anniversaries, respectively.

Also, each team had an honorary celebrity captain to help celebrate the 75th anniversary.

The celebrity captains were:

- Jim Kelly - Buffalo Sabres
- Michael J. Fox - Boston Bruins
- Ian Tyson - Calgary Flames
- Jim Belushi - Chicago Blackhawks
- Dave Coulier - Detroit Red Wings
- Kurt Browning - Edmonton Oilers
- Susan Saint James - Hartford Whalers
- John Candy - Los Angeles Kings
- David Wheaton - Minnesota North Stars
- Maurice Richard - Montreal Canadiens
- Yogi Berra - New Jersey Devils
- Ralph Macchio - New York Islanders
- Marv Albert - New York Rangers
- Bobby Rydell - Philadelphia Flyers
- Fred Rogers - Pittsburgh Penguins
- Gaetan Boucher - Quebec Nordiques
- Willie McCovey - San Jose Sharks
- John Goodman - St. Louis Blues
- Gordon Lightfoot - Toronto Maple Leafs
- Rick Hansen - Vancouver Canucks
- Larry King - Washington Capitals
- Burton Cummings - Winnipeg Jets

== Arena changes ==
The expansion San Jose Sharks moved into the Cow Palace in Daly City, California.

== Regular season ==
=== All-Star Game ===
The All-Star Game was held at The Spectrum in Philadelphia on 18 January 1992, the home of the Philadelphia Flyers.

=== Players strike ===
On April 1, 1992, the National Hockey League Players' Association (NHLPA) called the first strike action in NHL history. Issues between the players and league included how free agency worked, the arbitration process, playoff bonuses and pensions. The issue of how to share trading card revenue was considered to be one of the greatest stumbling blocks the two sides faced. By calling the strike so close to the end of the regular season, the players felt they had the advantage, as the majority of owners profits were realized in the playoffs. Playoff bonuses for players ranged from between US$3,000 for players on teams who lost in the first round, up to $25,000 for players on the Stanley Cup championship team. The owners, meanwhile, stood to earn $500,000 per playoff game played.

The strike ended on April 10 after the two sides reached an agreement, retroactive to the beginning of the season, allowing the final 30 games of the regular season and the playoffs to go on. This pushed the Stanley Cup Final into June for the first time.

As part of the deal, the following seasons were expanded from 80 to 84 games, and the players received a large increase in playoff bonuses and changes to free agency and arbitration. The two sides agreed to have each team play two games in neutral site locations, partly as a means of gauging interest in future expansion.

The strike fundamentally altered the relationship between the league and its players. As a result, NHL owners replaced John Ziegler as NHL President following the season, naming Gil Stein as interim president. On February 1, 1993, Gary Bettman became the first Commissioner of the NHL. Working towards labour peace was among the tasks handed to Bettman when the owners hired him. More labour disputes would however occur under Bettman's watch: 1994–95, 2004–05, and 2012–13.

=== Highlights ===
New York Rangers player Brian Leetch became the fifth defenceman, and last until 2023, to score 100 points in a season. He finished the season with 102 points and captured the James Norris Memorial Trophy as the league's best defenceman. The Rangers ended the season with 105 points, winning the Presidents' Trophy as the top regular-season team in the NHL; it was the first time the Rangers had topped the league since the 1941–42 season.

For the first time, the NHL finished play in the month of June. A primary reason for this was the 10-day NHL strike, the first work stoppage in league history, that started on April 1. The games that were supposed to be played during the strike were not canceled, but rescheduled and made up when play resumed on April 12.

For the first time in his NHL career, Wayne Gretzky failed to finish in the top two in scoring. Mario Lemieux won his third Art Ross Trophy with 131 points in just 64 games, while his Pittsburgh Penguins teammate Kevin Stevens became only the third person in NHL history to outscore Gretzky in the regular season (Marcel Dionne tied Gretzky in Wayne's rookie year but scored more goals, and Lemieux previously won the Art Ross Trophy over Gretzky in 1987–88 and 1988–89). This was also the first NHL season since 1979–80 where the scoring title was decided by a margin of less than 10 points between first and second place.

=== Final standings ===
Note: W = Wins, L = Losses, T = Ties, Pts = Points, GF= Goals For, GA = Goals against

==== Wales Conference ====
Adams Division
	GP	W	L	T	GF	GA	Pts
Montreal Canadiens	80	41	28	11	267	207	93
Boston Bruins	80	36	32	12	270	275	84
Buffalo Sabres	80	31	37	12	289	299	74
Hartford Whalers	80	26	41	13	247	283	65
Quebec Nordiques	80	20	48	12	255	318	52

Patrick Division
	GP	W	L	T	GF	GA	Pts
New York Rangers	80	50	25	5	321	246	105
Washington Capitals	80	45	27	8	330	257	98
Pittsburgh Penguins	80	39	32	9	343	308	87
New Jersey Devils	80	38	31	11	289	259	87
New York Islanders	80	34	35	11	291	299	79
Philadelphia Flyers	80	32	37	11	252	273	75

==== Campbell Conference ====
Norris Division
	GP	W	L	T	GF	GA	Pts
Detroit Red Wings	80	43	25	12	320	256	98
Chicago Blackhawks	80	36	29	15	257	236	87
St. Louis Blues	80	36	33	11	279	266	83
Minnesota North Stars	80	32	42	6	246	278	70
Toronto Maple Leafs	80	30	43	7	234	294	67

Smythe Division
	GP	W	L	T	GF	GA	Pts
Vancouver Canucks	80	42	26	12	285	250	96
Los Angeles Kings	80	35	31	14	287	250	84
Edmonton Oilers	80	36	34	10	295	297	82
Winnipeg Jets	80	33	32	15	251	244	81
Calgary Flames	80	31	37	12	296	305	74
San Jose Sharks	80	17	58	5	219	359	39

== Playoffs ==
=== Bracket ===
The top four teams in each division qualified for the playoffs. In each round, teams competed in a best-of-seven series (scores in the bracket indicate the number of games won in each best-of-seven series). In the division semifinals, the fourth seeded team in each division played against the division winner from their division. The other series matched the second and third place teams from the divisions. The two winning teams from each division's semifinals then met in the division finals. The two division winners of each conference then played in the conference finals. The two conference winners then advanced to the Stanley Cup Final.

Division semifinals	Division finals
A1	Montreal	4
A4	Hartford	3
A1	Montreal	0
A2	Boston	4
A2	Boston	4
A3	Buffalo	3
Prince of Wales Conference
P1	NY Rangers	4
P4	New Jersey	3
P1	NY Rangers	2
P3	Pittsburgh	4
P2	Washington	3
P3	Pittsburgh	4
N1	Detroit	4
N4	Minnesota	3
N1	Detroit	0
N2	Chicago	4
N2	Chicago	4
N3	St. Louis	2
Clarence Campbell Conference
S1	Vancouver	4
S4	Winnipeg	3
S1	Vancouver	2
S3	Edmonton	4
S2	Los Angeles	2
S3	Edmonton	4

Conference finals
A2	Boston	0
P3	Pittsburgh	4
N2	Chicago	4
S3	Edmonton	0

Stanley Cup Final
P3	Pittsburgh	4
N2	Chicago	0

== Awards ==
1991–92 NHL awards
Award	Recipient(s)	Runner(s)-up/Finalists
Presidents' Trophy (Best regular-season record)	New York Rangers	Washington Capitals
Prince of Wales Trophy (Wales Conference playoff champion)	Pittsburgh Penguins	Boston Bruins
Clarence S. Campbell Bowl (Campbell Conference playoff champion)	Chicago Blackhawks	Edmonton Oilers
Alka-Seltzer Plus-Minus Award (Best plus-minus statistic)	Paul Ysebaert (Detroit Red Wings)	Brad McCrimmon (Detroit Red Wings)
Art Ross Trophy (Player with most points)	Mario Lemieux (Pittsburgh Penguins)	Kevin Stevens (Pittsburgh Penguins)
Bill Masterton Memorial Trophy (Perseverance, sportsmanship, and dedication)	Mark Fitzpatrick (New York Islanders)	N/A
Calder Memorial Trophy (Best first-year player)	Pavel Bure (Vancouver Canucks)	Tony Amonte (New York Rangers); Nicklas Lidstrom (Detroit Red Wings)
Conn Smythe Trophy (Most valuable player, playoffs)	Mario Lemieux (Pittsburgh Penguins)	N/A
Frank J. Selke Trophy (Best defensive forward)	Guy Carbonneau (Montreal Canadiens)	Sergei Fedorov (Detroit Red Wings); Kelly Miller (Washington Capitals)
Hart Memorial Trophy (Most valuable player, regular season)	Mark Messier (New York Rangers)	Brett Hull (St. Louis Blues); Patrick Roy (Montreal Canadiens)
Jack Adams Award (Best coach)	Pat Quinn (Vancouver Canucks)	Pat Burns (Montreal Canadiens); Roger Neilson (New York Rangers)
James Norris Memorial Trophy (Best defenceman)	Brian Leetch (New York Rangers)	Ray Bourque (Boston Bruins); Phil Housley (Winnipeg Jets)
King Clancy Memorial Trophy (Leadership and humanitarian contribution)	Ray Bourque (Boston Bruins)	N/A
Lady Byng Memorial Trophy (Sportsmanship and excellence)	Wayne Gretzky (Los Angeles Kings)	Brian Leetch (New York Rangers); Joe Sakic (Quebec Nordiques)
Lester B. Pearson Award (Outstanding player)	Mark Messier (New York Rangers)	N/A
Vezina Trophy (Best goaltender)	Patrick Roy (Montreal Canadiens)	Bob Essensa (Winnipeg Jets); Kirk McLean (Vancouver Canucks)
William M. Jennings Trophy (Goaltender(s) of team with fewest goals against)	Patrick Roy (Montreal Canadiens)	N/A

=== All-Star teams ===
First team	Position	Second team
Patrick Roy, Montreal Canadiens	G	Kirk McLean, Vancouver Canucks
Brian Leetch, New York Rangers	D	Phil Housley, Winnipeg Jets
Ray Bourque, Boston Bruins	D	Scott Stevens, New Jersey Devils
Mark Messier, New York Rangers	C	Mario Lemieux, Pittsburgh Penguins
Brett Hull, St. Louis Blues	RW	Mark Recchi, PIT/PHI
Kevin Stevens, Pittsburgh Penguins	LW	Luc Robitaille, Los Angeles Kings

== Player statistics ==
=== Scoring leaders ===
Note: GP = Games played; G = Goals; A = Assists; Pts = Points

Player	Team	GP	G	A	Pts
Mario Lemieux	Pittsburgh	64	44	87	131
Kevin Stevens	Pittsburgh	80	54	69	123
Wayne Gretzky	Los Angeles	74	31	90	121
Brett Hull	St. Louis	73	70	39	109
Luc Robitaille	Los Angeles	80	44	63	107
Mark Messier	NY Rangers	79	35	72	107
Jeremy Roenick	Chicago	80	53	50	103
Steve Yzerman	Detroit	79	45	58	103
Brian Leetch	NY Rangers	80	22	80	102
Adam Oates	St. Louis/Boston	80	20	79	99

=== Leading goaltenders ===
Note: GP = Games played; TOI = Time on ice (minutes); W = Wins; L = Losses; T = Ties; GA = Goals against; SO = Shutouts; Sv% = Save percentage; GAA = Goals against average

Regular Season
Player	Team	GP	TOI	W	L	T	GA	SO	Sv%	GAA
Patrick Roy	Montreal	67	3935	36	22	8	155	5	.914	2.36
Ed Belfour	Chicago	52	2928	21	18	10	132	5	.894	2.70
Kirk McLean	Vancouver	65	3852	38	17	9	176	5	.901	2.74
John Vanbiesbrouck	NY Rangers	45	2526	27	13	3	120	2	.910	2.85
Bob Essensa	Winnipeg	47	2627	21	17	6	126	5	.910	2.88

== Coaches ==
=== Patrick Division ===
- New Jersey Devils: Tom McVie
- New York Islanders: Al Arbour
- New York Rangers: Roger Neilson
- Philadelphia Flyers: Paul Holmgren and Bill Dineen
- Pittsburgh Penguins: Scotty Bowman
- Washington Capitals: Terry Murray

=== Adams Division ===
- Boston Bruins: Rick Bowness
- Buffalo Sabres: John Muckler
- Hartford Whalers: Jim Roberts
- Montreal Canadiens: Pat Burns
- Quebec Nordiques: Pierre Page

=== Norris Division ===
- Chicago Blackhawks: Mike Keenan
- Detroit Red Wings: Bryan Murray
- Minnesota North Stars: Bob Gainey
- St. Louis Blues: Brian Sutter
- Toronto Maple Leafs: Tom Watt

=== Smythe Division ===
- Calgary Flames: Doug Risebrough and Guy Charron
- Edmonton Oilers: Ted Green
- Los Angeles Kings: Tom Webster
- San Jose Sharks: George Kingston
- Vancouver Canucks: Pat Quinn
- Winnipeg Jets: John Paddock

== Milestones ==
=== Debuts ===
The following is a list of players of note who played their first NHL game in 1991–92 (listed with their first team):

- Stu Barnes, Winnipeg Jets
- Martin Brodeur, New Jersey Devils
- Pavel Bure, Vancouver Canucks
- Keith Carney, Buffalo Sabres
- Evgeny Davydov, Winnipeg Jets
- Ted Donato, Boston Bruins
- Pat Falloon, San Jose Sharks
- Adam Foote, Quebec Nordiques
- Bill Guerin, New Jersey Devils
- Derian Hatcher, Minnesota North Stars
- Bret Hedican, St. Louis Blues
- Arturs Irbe, San Jose Sharks
- Trevor Kidd, Calgary Flames
- Igor Kravchuk, Chicago Blackhawks
- Ray Whitney, San Jose Sharks
- Joe Juneau, Boston Bruins
- Valeri Kamensky, Quebec Nordiques
- Vladimir Konstantinov, Detroit Red Wings
- Vyacheslav Kozlov, Detroit Red Wings
- Martin Lapointe, Detroit Red Wings
- Nicklas Lidstrom, Detroit Red Wings
- Shawn McEachern, Pittsburgh Penguins
- Marty McInnis, New York Islanders
- Glen Murray, Boston Bruins
- Scott Niedermayer, New Jersey Devils
- Felix Potvin, Toronto Maple Leafs
- Jozef Stumpel, Boston Bruins
- Darryl Sydor, Los Angeles Kings
- Keith Tkachuk, Winnipeg Jets
- Rob Zamuner, New York Rangers

=== Last games ===
The following is a list of players of note that played their last game in the NHL in 1991–92 (listed with their last team):

- Barry Pederson, Boston Bruins
- Rick Vaive, Buffalo Sabres
- Tony Tanti, Buffalo Sabres
- Clint Malarchuk, Buffalo Sabres
- Greg Millen, Detroit Red Wings
- Ilkka Sinisalo, Los Angeles Kings
- Larry Robinson, Los Angeles Kings
- Chris Nilan, Montreal Canadiens
- Patrik Sundstrom, New Jersey Devils
- Rick Green, New York Islanders
- Jiri Hrdina, Pittsburgh Penguins
- John Tonelli, Quebec Nordiques
- Mark Pavelich, San Jose Sharks
- Ken Linseman, Toronto Maple Leafs
- Mike Bullard, Toronto Maple Leafs
- Randy Gregg, Vancouver Canucks
- Mike Liut, Washington Capitals
- Mario Marois, Winnipeg Jets
- Lucien DeBlois, Winnipeg Jets
- Aaron Broten, Winnipeg Jets

== Broadcasting ==
This was the fourth season of the league's Canadian national broadcast rights deals with TSN and Hockey Night in Canada on CBC. Saturday night regular season games continued to air on CBC, while TSN televised selected weeknight games. Coverage of the Stanley Cup playoffs was primarily on CBC, with TSN airing first round all-U.S. series.

SportsChannel America signed a one-year extension to its U.S. national broadcast rights deal after its original three-year deal expired. Meanwhile, NBC televised the All-Star Game for the third consecutive season. After the season, the league signed a new deal with ESPN, replacing SportsChannel America.

== See also ==
- List of Stanley Cup champions
- 1991 NHL entry draft
- 1991 NHL dispersal and expansion drafts
- 1991–92 NHL transactions
- 43rd National Hockey League All-Star Game
- National Hockey League All-Star Game
- NHL All-Rookie Team
- Lester Patrick Trophy
- Ice hockey at the 1992 Winter Olympics
- 1991 Canada Cup
- 1991 in sports
- 1992 in sports
