= Matteau =

Matteau is a French surname. Notable people with the surname include:

- Alyson Matteau (born 1997), Canadian-American hockey player
- Stefan Matteau (born 1994), Canadian hockey player
- Stéphane Matteau (born 1969), Canadian hockey player, father of Stefan
