= 1994 Stanley Cup playoffs =

Tournament details
- Dates: April 16–June 14, 1994
- Teams: 16
- Defending champions: Montreal Canadiens

Final positions
- Champions: New York Rangers
- Runners-up: Vancouver Canucks

Tournament statistics
- Scoring leader(s): Brian Leetch (Rangers) (34 points)

Awards
- MVP: Brian Leetch (Rangers)

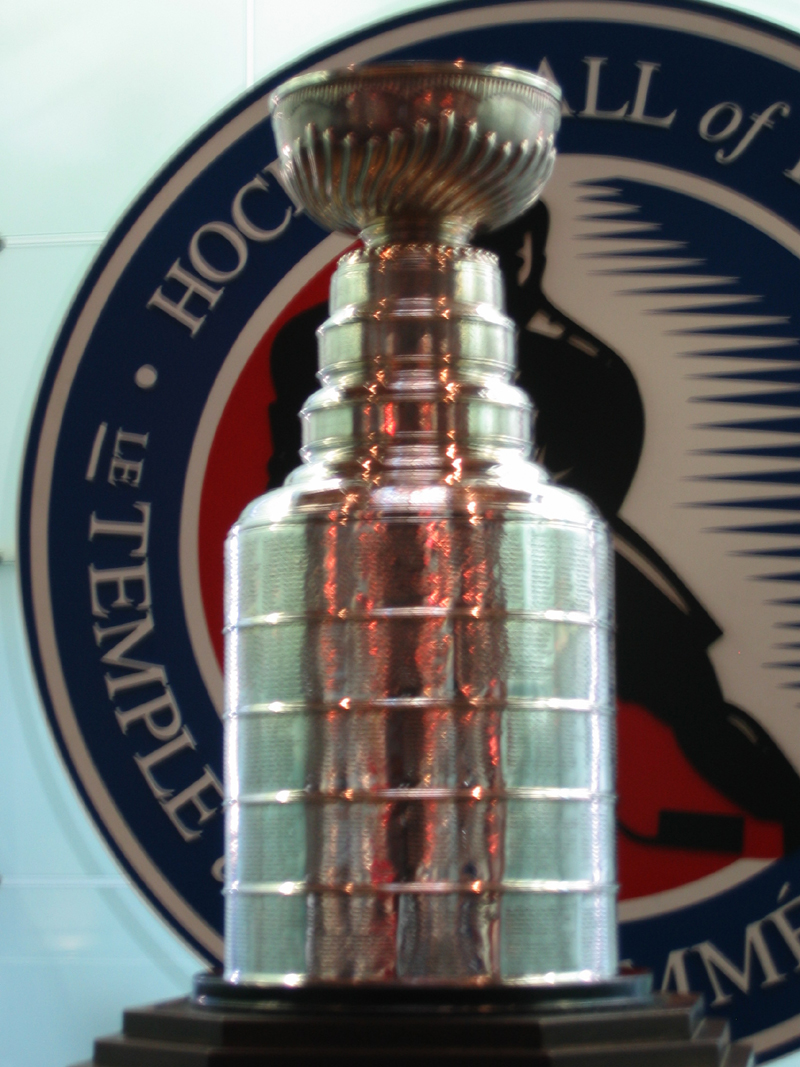
The Stanley Cup at the Hockey Hall of Fame

The 1994 Stanley Cup playoffs, the playoff tournament of the National Hockey League (NHL), began after the conclusion of the 1993–94 NHL season. Prior to the season, the league renamed its conferences and divisions, and switched from a divisional-based to a conference-based playoff structure. The sixteen teams that qualified, eight from each conference, played best-of-seven game series for conference quarterfinals, semifinals and championships; and then the conference champions played a best-of-seven series for the Stanley Cup. The playoffs ended when the New York Rangers defeated the Vancouver Canucks in the seventh game of the 1994 Stanley Cup Final. In total, an NHL record seven game sevens were played in this year's playoffs, two of which went to overtime and was later repeated in 2011 and 2014, which were also the respective years where the Canucks and the Rangers made their next appearances in the Final.

For the first time since joining the NHL, all four former WHA teams (the Edmonton Oilers, Hartford Whalers, Quebec Nordiques, and Winnipeg Jets) failed to make the playoffs. Wayne Gretzky also missed the playoffs for the first time in his career. Conversely, the San Jose Sharks became the first post-1990 expansion team to make the playoffs. All series played between Central and Pacific Division teams had a 2–3–2 format to reduce travel. This remains the last time that two Canadian teams made it to the Conference Finals in the same year, let alone faced each other in that particular round.

== Playoff seeds ==
This was the first season of the NHL's new conference-oriented playoff format, emulating the NBA's seeding format in use then. The top eight teams in each conference qualified for the playoffs. The top two seeds in each conference were awarded to the division winners; while the six remaining spots were awarded to the highest finishers in their respective conferences.

The following teams qualified for the playoffs:

=== Eastern Conference ===
1. New York Rangers, Atlantic Division champions, Eastern Conference regular season champions, Presidents' Trophy winners – 112 points
2. Pittsburgh Penguins, Northeast Division champions – 101 points
3. New Jersey Devils – 106 points
4. Boston Bruins – 97 points
5. Montreal Canadiens – 96 points
6. Buffalo Sabres – 95 points
7. Washington Capitals – 88 points
8. New York Islanders – 84 points

=== Western Conference ===
1. Detroit Red Wings, Central Division champions, Western Conference regular season champions – 100 points
2. Calgary Flames, Pacific Division champions – 97 points
3. Toronto Maple Leafs – 98 points
4. Dallas Stars – 97 points
5. St. Louis Blues – 91 points
6. Chicago Blackhawks – 87 points
7. Vancouver Canucks – 85 points
8. San Jose Sharks – 82 points

== Playoff bracket ==
In each round, teams competed in a best-of-seven series. Most followed a 2–2–1–1–1 format (scores in the bracket indicate the number of games won in each best-of-seven series). The team with home ice advantage played at home for games one and two (and games five and seven, if necessary), and the other team played at home for games three and four (and game six, if necessary). All series played between Central and Pacific Division teams instead had a 2–3–2 format to reduce travel, with the sites for games five and six switched, and the team with home-ice advantage had the option to start the series on the road instead of at home. The top eight teams in each conference made the playoffs, with the two division winners seeded 1–2 based on regular season records, and the six remaining teams seeded 3–8.

The NHL used "re-seeding", similar to the National Football League, instead of a fixed bracket playoff system used by the NBA. During the first three rounds, the highest remaining seed in each conference was matched against the lowest remaining seed, the second-highest remaining seed played the second-lowest remaining seed, and so forth. The higher-seeded team was awarded home-ice advantage. The two conference winners then advanced to the Stanley Cup Final, where home-ice advantage was awarded to the team that had the better regular season record.

Conference quarterfinals	Conference semifinals
1	NY Rangers	4
8	NY Islanders	0
1	NY Rangers	4
7	Washington	1
2	Pittsburgh	2
7	Washington	4
Eastern Conference
3	New Jersey	4
6	Buffalo	3
3	New Jersey	4
4	Boston	2
4	Boston	4
5	Montreal	3
1	Detroit	3
8	San Jose	4
3	Toronto	4
8	San Jose	3
2	Calgary	3
7	Vancouver	4
Western Conference
3	Toronto	4
6	Chicago	2
4	Dallas	1
7	Vancouver	4
4	Dallas	4
5	St. Louis	0

Conference finals
1	NY Rangers	4
3	New Jersey	3
3	Toronto	1
7	Vancouver	4

Stanley Cup Final
E1	NY Rangers	4
W7	Vancouver	3

== Conference quarterfinals ==
=== Eastern Conference quarterfinals ===
==== (1) New York Rangers vs. (8) New York Islanders ====
The New York Rangers earned the Presidents' Trophy as the NHL's best regular season team with 112 points. The Islanders qualified as the eighth seed earning 84 points during the regular season. This was the eighth playoff series between these two rivals, with the Islanders winning five of the previous seven series. They last met in the 1990 Patrick Division Semifinals which the Rangers won in five games. The Islanders won the season series earning six of ten points during this year's five game regular season series.

This was the last time that the Islanders got swept in a playoff series until the 2019 Eastern Conference Second Round.

April 17	New York Islanders	0–6	New York Rangers	Madison Square Garden	Recap
No scoring		First period	03:32 – pp – Brian Leetch (1); 15:28 – pp – Steve Larmer (1)
No scoring		Second period	09:13 – Mark Messier (1); 12:19 – Adam Graves (1); 14:05 – Alexei Kovalev (1); 17:38 – Sergei Zubov (1)
No scoring		Third period	No scoring
Ron Hextall 22 saves / 28 shots Jamie McLennan 11 saves / 11 shots		Goalie stats	Mike Richter 21 saves / 21 shots

April 18	New York Islanders	0–6	New York Rangers	Madison Square Garden	Recap
No scoring		First period	05:41 – Alexei Kovalev (2)
No scoring		Second period	00:18 – Mark Messier (2); 01:38 – Kevin Lowe (1); 12:29 – Craig MacTavish (1); 17:06 – Stéphane Matteau (1)
No scoring		Third period	04:23 – pp – Brian Noonan (1)
Jamie McLennan 30 saves / 36 shots		Goalie stats	Mike Richter 29 saves / 29 shots

April 21	New York Rangers	5–1	New York Islanders	Nassau Coliseum	Recap
Esa Tikkanen (1) – 02:08; Brian Leetch (2) – pp – 03:40		First period	No scoring
Adam Graves (2) – pp – 10:43; Alexei Kovalev (3) – pp – 18:48		Second period	15:28 – Ray Ferraro (1)
Adam Graves (3) – 10:37		Third period	No scoring
Mike Richter 21 saves / 22 shots		Goalie stats	Ron Hextall 13 saves / 18 shots

April 24	New York Rangers	5–2	New York Islanders	Nassau Coliseum	Recap
Alexei Kovalev (4) – pp – 11:59		First period	01:28 – pp – Steve Thomas (1); 07:24 – Dan Plante (1)
Sergei Zubov (2) – pp – 03:42; Mark Messier (3) – 10:22		Second period	No scoring
Steve Larmer (2) – 08:34; Mark Messier (4) – 17:08		Third period	No scoring
Mike Richter 16 saves / 18 shots		Goalie stats	Ron Hextall 29 saves / 34 shots

New York Rangers won series 4–0

==== (2) Pittsburgh Penguins vs. (7) Washington Capitals ====
The Pittsburgh Penguins entered the playoffs as the second seed in the Eastern Conference by winning the Northeast Division with 101 points. The Washington Capitals earned 88 points during the regular season to finish seventh overall in the Eastern Conference. This was the third playoff meeting between these two rivals, with Pittsburgh winning both previous series. They last met in the 1992 Patrick Division Semifinals which Pittsburgh won in seven games after erasing a 3–1 deficit. Washington won the season series earning five of eight points during this year's four game regular season series.

Until their 2018 championship season, this was the only time the Capitals had defeated the Penguins in their first ten playoff series.

April 17	Washington Capitals	5–3	Pittsburgh Penguins	Civic Arena	Recap
Dmitri Khristich (1) – 04:49		First period	12:10 – Mario Lemieux (1); 14:14 – Joe Mullen (1)
Peter Bondra (1) – 11:07; Mike Ridley (1) – 13:29		Second period	No scoring
Joe Juneau (1) – 10:34; Michal Pivonka (1) – 19:26		Third period	19:16 – Mario Lemieux (2)
Don Beaupre 27 saves / 30 shots		Goalie stats	Tom Barrasso 26 saves / 31 shots

April 19	Washington Capitals	1–2	Pittsburgh Penguins	Civic Arena	Recap
No scoring		First period	06:19 – pp – Mario Lemieux (3); 09:06 – Rick Tocchet (1)
Michal Pivonka (2) – pp – 00:57		Second period	No scoring
No scoring		Third period	No scoring
Byron Dafoe 15 saves / 17 shots		Goalie stats	Tom Barrasso 34 saves / 35 shots

April 21	Pittsburgh Penguins	0–2	Washington Capitals	USAir Arena	Recap
No scoring		First period	No scoring
No scoring		Second period	14:11 – sh – Joe Reekie (1)
No scoring		Third period	19:44 – en – Joe Reekie (2)
Tom Barrasso 16 saves / 17 shots		Goalie stats	Don Beaupre 27 saves / 27 shots

April 23	Pittsburgh Penguins	1–4	Washington Capitals	USAir Arena	Recap
Martin Straka (1) – 14:10		First period	04:51 – Dmitri Khristich (2)
No scoring		Second period	13:47 – Peter Bondra (2)
No scoring		Third period	01:42 – pp – Joe Juneau (2); 19:06 – en – Dave Poulin (1)
Tom Barrasso 27 saves / 30 shots		Goalie stats	Don Beaupre 21 saves / 22 shots

April 25	Washington Capitals	2–3	Pittsburgh Penguins	Civic Arena	Recap
No scoring		First period	01:41 – Shawn McEachern (1)
Mike Ridley (2) – 05:10; Kevin Hatcher (1) – 06:45		Second period	15:25 – Kevin Stevens (1)
No scoring		Third period	09:21 – Jaromir Jagr (1)
Byron Dafoe 19 saves / 22 shots		Goalie stats	Tom Barrasso 26 saves / 28 shots

April 27	Pittsburgh Penguins	3–6	Washington Capitals	USAir Arena	Recap
Jaromir Jagr (2) – 10:32; Rick Tocchet (2) – pp – 15:05		First period	01:29 – Joe Juneau (3); 07:49 – sh – Kelly Miller (1); 09:42 – pp – John Slaney (1)
No scoring		Second period	01:25 – Calle Johansson (1); 08:27 – Dave Poulin (2)
Mario Lemieux (4) – 10:42		Third period	19:41 – en – Michal Pivonka (3)
Tom Barrasso 16 saves / 21 shots		Goalie stats	Don Beaupre 26 saves / 29 shots

Washington won series 4–2

==== (3) New Jersey Devils vs. (6) Buffalo Sabres ====
The New Jersey Devils entered the playoffs as the third seed in the Eastern Conference with 106 points. The Buffalo Sabres earned 95 points during the regular season to finish sixth overall in the Eastern Conference. This was the first playoff meeting between these two teams. New Jersey won three of the four games in this year's regular season series.

April 17	Buffalo Sabres	2–0	New Jersey Devils	Brendan Byrne Arena	Recap
Todd Simon (1) – pp – 19:49		First period	No scoring
No scoring		Second period	No scoring
Alexander Mogilny (1) – en – 19:51		Third period	No scoring
Dominik Hasek 30 saves / 30 shots		Goalie stats	Martin Brodeur 21 saves / 22 shots

April 19	Buffalo Sabres	1–2	New Jersey Devils	Brendan Byrne Arena	Recap
No scoring		First period	No scoring
No scoring		Second period	01:33 – Stephane Richer (1)
Alexander Mogilny (2) – 00:38		Third period	13:39 – pp – Scott Stevens (1)
Dominik Hasek 30 saves / 32 shots		Goalie stats	Martin Brodeur 23 saves / 24 shots

April 21	New Jersey Devils	2–1	Buffalo Sabres	Buffalo Memorial Auditorium	Recap
Stephane Richer (2) – 19:01		First period	No scoring
Tommy Albelin (1) – 15:43		Second period	No scoring
No scoring		Third period	04:08 – pp – Alexander Mogilny (3)
Martin Brodeur 29 saves / 30 shots		Goalie stats	Dominik Hasek 24 saves / 26 shots

April 23	New Jersey Devils	3–5	Buffalo Sabres	Buffalo Memorial Auditorium	Recap
Bruce Driver (1) – pp – 09:11		First period	15:08 – pp – Wayne Presley (1); 15:42 – Yuri Khmylev (1)
Claude Lemieux (1) – 01:07; John MacLean (1) – pp – 18:36		Second period	03:16 – Yuri Khmylev (2)
No scoring		Third period	00:30 – Wayne Presley (2); 11:35 – Rob Ray (1)
Martin Brodeur 25 saves / 30 shots		Goalie stats	Dominik Hasek 20 saves / 23 shots

April 25	Buffalo Sabres	3–5	New Jersey Devils	Brendan Byrne Arena	Recap
Yuri Khmylev (3) – 02:30; Derek Plante (1) – 10:56		First period	07:40 – pp – John MacLean (2)
Alexander Mogilny (4) – 05:42		Second period	07:59 – Claude Lemieux (2); 18:05 – pp – Stephane Richer (3)
No scoring		Third period	04:30 – Claude Lemieux (3); 19:52 – en – John MacLean (3)
Dominik Hasek 30 saves / 34 shots		Goalie stats	Martin Brodeur 17 saves / 20 shots

April 27	New Jersey Devils	0–1	4OT	Buffalo Sabres	Buffalo Memorial Auditorium	Recap
No scoring		First period		No scoring
No scoring		Second period		No scoring
No scoring		Third period		No scoring
No scoring		Fourth overtime period		05:43 – Dave Hannan (1)
Martin Brodeur 49 saves / 50 shots		Goalie stats		Dominik Hasek 70 saves / 70 shots

April 29	Buffalo Sabres	1–2	New Jersey Devils	Brendan Byrne Arena	Recap
Philippe Boucher (1) – pp – 06:00		First period	09:53 – pp – Bruce Driver (2)
No scoring		Second period	13:49 – Claude Lemieux (4)
No scoring		Third period	No scoring
Dominik Hasek 44 saves / 46 shots		Goalie stats	Martin Brodeur 17 saves / 18 shots

New Jersey won series 4–3

==== (4) Boston Bruins vs. (5) Montreal Canadiens ====
The Boston Bruins entered the playoffs as the fourth seed in the Eastern Conference with 97 points. The Montreal Canadiens earned 96 points during the regular season to finish fifth overall in the Eastern Conference. This was the twenty-eighth playoff meeting between these two rivals, with Montreal winning twenty-one of the previous twenty-seven series. This was also the tenth time in eleven years these two team had met in the playoffs. They last met in the 1992 Adams Division Finals, which Boston won in a four-game sweep. Montreal won the season series earning six of ten points during this year's five game regular season series. Game six was the final playoff game played at the Montreal Forum.

April 16	Montreal Canadiens	2–3	Boston Bruins	Boston Garden	Recap
Brian Bellows (1) – 06:55		First period	14:51 – pp – Mariusz Czerkawski (1)
Mike Keane (1) – 06:19		Second period	18:52 – pp – Adam Oates (1); 19:43 – pp – Ted Donato (1)
No scoring		Third period	No scoring
Patrick Roy 25 saves / 28 shots		Goalie stats	Jon Casey 24 saves / 26 shots

April 18	Montreal Canadiens	3–2	Boston Bruins	Boston Garden	Recap
Kirk Muller (1) – pp – 04:42		First period	No scoring
No scoring		Second period	15:42 – Don Sweeney (1); 19:18 – pp – Glen Wesley (1)
Paul DiPietro (1) – pp – 00:18; Kirk Muller (2) – 04:32		Third period	No scoring
Patrick Roy 40 saves / 42 shots		Goalie stats	Jon Casey 21 saves / 24 shots

April 21	Boston Bruins	6–3	Montreal Canadiens	Montreal Forum	Recap
Bryan Smolinski (1) – pp – 08:46; Fred Knipscheer (1) – 14:46; Dave Reid (1) – sh – 18:12		First period	No scoring
Brent Hughes (1) – 09:57; Glen Murray (1) – 16:31		Second period	02:25 – Benoit Brunet (1); 11:50 – Mike Keane (2); 11:56 – Gilbert Dionne (1)
Dave Reid (2) – en – 18:57		Third period	No scoring
Vincent Riendeau 24 saves / 27 shots		Goalie stats	Ron Tugnutt 20 saves / 25 shots

April 23	Boston Bruins	2–5	Montreal Canadiens	Montreal Forum	Recap
Adam Oates (2) – 13:41		First period	05:40 – pp – Kirk Muller (3); 10:54 – pp – Kirk Muller (4); 11:34 – pp – Paul DiPietro (2)
Ted Donato (2) – 02:54		Second period	19:14 – Guy Carbonneau (1)
No scoring		Third period	03:33 – Ed Ronan (1)
Vincent Riendeau 10 saves / 15 shots		Goalie stats	Patrick Roy 39 saves / 41 shots

April 25	Montreal Canadiens	2–1	OT	Boston Bruins	Boston Garden	Recap
No scoring		First period		No scoring
No scoring		Second period		No scoring
John LeClair (1) – 14:49		Third period		02:12 – Jozef Stumpel (1)
Kirk Muller (5) – 17:18		First overtime period		No scoring
Patrick Roy 60 saves / 61 shots		Goalie stats		Jon Casey 34 saves / 36 shots

April 27	Boston Bruins	3–2	Montreal Canadiens	Montreal Forum	Recap
Bryan Smolinski (2) – pp – 03:00		First period	No scoring
Steve Heinze (1) – 09:36		Second period	17:50 – pp – John LeClair (2)
Al Iafrate (1) – 07:21		Third period	02:57 – Kirk Muller (6)
Jon Casey 20 saves / 22 shots		Goalie stats	Patrick Roy 22 saves / 25 shots

April 29	Montreal Canadiens	3–5	Boston Bruins	Boston Garden	Recap
No scoring		First period	03:43 – Glen Murray (2); 11:47 – Ted Donato (3)
Vincent Damphousse (1) – 05:44		Second period	01:23 – pp – Adam Oates (3); 04:22 – Fred Knipscheer (2)
Kevin Haller (1) – 13:12; Mike Keane (3) – 14:43		Third period	05:03 – Ray Bourque (1)
Patrick Roy 26 saves / 31 shots		Goalie stats	Jon Casey 26 saves / 29 shots

Boston won series 4–3

=== Western Conference quarterfinals ===
==== (1) Detroit Red Wings vs. (8) San Jose Sharks ====
The Detroit Red Wings entered the playoffs as the Western Conference regular season champions with 100 points. The San Jose Sharks earned 82 points during the regular season to finish eighth overall in the Western Conference. This was the first playoff meeting between these two teams. The Sharks made their first appearance in the Stanley Cup playoffs in their third season since entering the league in the 1991–92 season. The most recent team to represent the San Francisco Bay Area prior to this was the Oakland Seals, who lost in the Stanley Cup Quarterfinals in 1970. Detroit won three of the four games in this year's regular season series. The Sharks shocked the top-seeded Red Wings in seven games, becoming the first eighth-seeded team in North American sports history to defeat a number one seed. Jamie Baker scored the game-winning goal with 6:35 left in the third period of game seven to pull off the historic upset.

April 18	San Jose Sharks	5–4	Detroit Red Wings	Joe Louis Arena	Recap
Shawn Cronin (1) – 12:55; Igor Larionov (1) – 15:28; Sergei Makarov (1) – pp – 17:03		First period	No scoring
No scoring		Second period	02:24 – pp – Steve Chiasson (1); 17:41 – Sheldon Kennedy (1)
Jamie Baker (1) – 04:42; Vlastimil Kroupa (1) – 15:36		Third period	01:34 – Darren McCarty (1); 06:01 – pp – Greg Johnson (1)
Arturs Irbe 33 saves / 37 shots		Goalie stats	Bob Essensa 19 saves / 24 shots

April 20	San Jose Sharks	0–4	Detroit Red Wings	Joe Louis Arena	Recap
No scoring		First period	No scoring
No scoring		Second period	00:46 – Shawn Burr (1)
No scoring		Third period	02:32 – Bob Probert (1); 05:07 – Dino Ciccarelli (1); 06:43 – pp – Nicklas Lidstrom (1)
Arturs Irbe 24 saves / 28 shots		Goalie stats	Chris Osgood 22 saves / 22 shots

April 22	Detroit Red Wings	3–2	San Jose Sharks	San Jose Arena	Recap
Darren McCarty (2) – 01:53; Dino Ciccarelli (2) – 12:53		First period	No scoring
Shawn Burr (2) – 19:31		Second period	17:14 – pp – Rob Gaudreau (1)
No scoring		Third period	19:28 – pp – Sergei Makarov (2)
Chris Osgood 22 saves / 24 shots		Goalie stats	Arturs Irbe 27 saves / 30 shots

April 23	Detroit Red Wings	3–4	San Jose Sharks	San Jose Arena	Recap
Dino Ciccarelli (3) – 07:17; Greg Johnson (2) – 10:21		First period	No scoring
Kris Draper (1) – 06:08		Second period	03:45 – sh – Tom Pederson (1); 08:01 – Igor Larionov (2); 11:55 – pp – Ulf Dahlen (1)
No scoring		Third period	06:35 – Sergei Makarov (3)
Chris Osgood 18 saves / 22 shots		Goalie stats	Arturs Irbe 21 saves / 24 shots

April 26	Detroit Red Wings	4–6	San Jose Sharks	San Jose Arena	Recap
Paul Coffey (1) – 13:33; Ray Sheppard (1) – 14:13		First period	02:47 – pp – Sergei Makarov (4); 08:34 – Todd Elik (1)
No scoring		Second period	18:45 – Sergei Makarov (5)
Nicklas Lidstrom (2) – sh – 06:44; Nicklas Lidstrom (3) – 15:22		Third period	02:08 – Ulf Dahlen (2); 08:08 – Johan Garpenlov (1); 16:43 – Bob Errey (1)
Bob Essensa 15 saves / 19 shots Chris Osgood 0 saves / 2 shots		Goalie stats	Arturs Irbe 31 saves / 35 shots

April 28	San Jose Sharks	1–7	Detroit Red Wings	Joe Louis Arena	Recap
No scoring		First period	02:03 – Sergei Fedorov (1); 15:20 – pp – Steve Chiasson (2); 16:33 – Ray Sheppard (2); 16:56 – Slava Kozlov (1)
Ulf Dahlen (3) – pp – 04:04		Second period	01:25 – Steve Yzerman (1); 11:21 – Dino Ciccarelli (4)
No scoring		Third period	08:31 – pp – Dino Ciccarelli (5)
Arturs Irbe 20 saves / 26 shots Jimmy Waite 7 saves / 8 shots		Goalie stats	Chris Osgood 22 saves / 23 shots

April 30	San Jose Sharks	3–2	Detroit Red Wings	Joe Louis Arena	Recap
Johan Garpenlov (2) – 00:47; Sergei Makarov (6) – 13:59		First period	19:47 – sh – Kris Draper (2)
No scoring		Second period	02:36 – Vyacheslav Kozlov (2)
Jamie Baker (2) – 13:25		Third period	No scoring
Arturs Irbe 28 saves / 30 shots		Goalie stats	Chris Osgood 14 saves / 17 shots

San Jose won series 4–3

==== (2) Calgary Flames vs. (7) Vancouver Canucks ====
The Calgary Flames entered the playoffs as the second seed in the Western Conference by winning the Pacific Division with 97 points. The Vancouver Canucks earned 85 points during the regular season to finish seventh overall in the Western Conference. This was the fifth playoff meeting between these two rivals, with Calgary winning three of the previous four series. They last met in the 1989 Smythe Division Semifinals which the Flames won in seven games. Calgary won the season series earning nine of fourteen points during this year's seven game regular season series.

The Canucks won the series after being down 3–1. They are the only team to date to win a series after being down 3–1 with all three games being won in overtime.

April 18	Vancouver Canucks	5–0	Calgary Flames	Olympic Saddledome	Recap
No scoring		First period	No scoring
Geoff Courtnall (1) – 01:15; Cliff Ronning (1) – pp – 10:54; Dave Babych (1) – 12:16		Second period	No scoring
Trevor Linden (1) – 04:26; Jeff Brown (1) – pp – 15:53		Third period	No scoring
Kirk McLean 31 saves / 31 shots		Goalie stats	Mike Vernon 23 saves / 28 shots

April 20	Vancouver Canucks	5–7	Calgary Flames	Olympic Saddledome	Recap
Jeff Brown (2) – 08:08		First period	07:30 – Joe Nieuwendyk (1); 09:08 – sh – Mike Sullivan (1); 15:46 – pp – Al MacInnis (1); 19:10 – Al MacInnis (2)
Geoff Courtnall (2) – sh – 02:44; Cliff Ronning (2) – pp – 13:31; Martin Gelinas (1) – 18:54		Second period	10:58 – pp – Joe Nieuwendyk (2); 17:46 – pp – Theoren Fleury (1)
Trevor Linden (2) – 02:45		Third period	01:16 – pp – German Titov (1)
Kirk McLean 27 saves / 34 shots		Goalie stats	Mike Vernon 23 saves / 28 shots

April 22	Calgary Flames	4–2	Vancouver Canucks	Pacific Coliseum	Recap
No scoring		First period	No scoring
No scoring		Second period	No scoring
Wes Walz (1) – 03:33; Theoren Fleury (2) – 08:29; Gary Roberts (1) – 18:23; Theoren Fleury (3) – en – 19:58		Third period	06:35 – Sergio Momesso (1); 18:42 – Greg Adams (1)
Mike Vernon 26 saves / 28 shots		Goalie stats	Kirk McLean 23 saves / 26 shots

April 24	Calgary Flames	3–2	Vancouver Canucks	Pacific Coliseum	Recap
Ronnie Stern (1) – 10:07		First period	17:54 – pp – Martin Gelinas (2)
No scoring		Second period	02:06 – Trevor Linden (3)
Wes Walz (2) – 00:44; Theoren Fleury (4) – 03:38		Third period	No scoring
Mike Vernon 42 saves / 44 shots		Goalie stats	Kirk McLean 25 saves / 28 shots

April 26	Vancouver Canucks	2–1	OT	Calgary Flames	Olympic Saddledome	Recap
Pavel Bure (1) – 04:48		First period		05:53 – German Titov (2)
No scoring		Second period		No scoring
No scoring		Third period		No scoring
Geoff Courtnall (3) – 07:15		First overtime period		No scoring
Kirk McLean 21 saves / 22 shots		Goalie stats		Mike Vernon 30 saves / 32 shots

April 28	Calgary Flames	2–3	OT	Vancouver Canucks	Pacific Coliseum	Recap
Gary Roberts (2) – pp – 19:59		First period		08:38 – Gerald Diduck (1)
No scoring		Second period		07:10 – Jose Charbonneau (1)
Wes Walz (3) – 03:24		Third period		No scoring
No scoring		First overtime period		16:43 – pp – Trevor Linden (4)
Mike Vernon 22 saves / 25 shots		Goalie stats		Kirk McLean 30 saves / 32 shots

April 30	Vancouver Canucks	4–3	2OT	Calgary Flames	Olympic Saddledome	Recap
Pavel Bure (2) – pp – 09:24; Geoff Courtnall (4) – 11:44		First period		05:04 – Theoren Fleury (5)
No scoring		Second period		09:30 – Ronnie Stern (2); 10:34 – Theoren Fleury (6)
Greg Adams (2) – 16:23		Third period		No scoring
Pavel Bure (3) – 02:20		Second overtime period		No scoring
Kirk McLean 46 saves / 49 shots		Goalie stats		Mike Vernon 31 saves / 35 shots

Vancouver won series 4–3

==== (3) Toronto Maple Leafs vs. (6) Chicago Blackhawks ====
The Toronto Maple Leafs entered the playoffs as the third seed in the Western Conference with 98 points. The Chicago Blackhawks earned 87 points during the regular season to finish sixth overall in the Western Conference. This was the eighth playoff meeting between these two teams, with Toronto winning five of the seven previous series. They last met in the 1986 Norris Division Semifinals which Toronto won in a three-game sweep. These teams split their six-game regular season series. Game six was the last NHL game played at Chicago Stadium.

April 18	Chicago Blackhawks	1–5	Toronto Maple Leafs	Maple Leaf Gardens	Recap
No scoring		First period	02:33 – Wendel Clark (1); 07:38 – pp – Doug Gilmour (1); 11:37 – sh – Kent Manderville (1)
No scoring		Second period	03:35 – Jamie Macoun (1); 06:25 – pp – Dave Andreychuk (1)
Chris Chelios (1) – pp – 03:17		Third period	No scoring
Ed Belfour 23 saves / 28 shots		Goalie stats	Felix Potvin 27 saves / 28 shots

April 20	Chicago Blackhawks	0–1	OT	Toronto Maple Leafs	Maple Leaf Gardens	Recap
No scoring		First period		No scoring
No scoring		Second period		No scoring
No scoring		Third period		No scoring
No scoring		First overtime period		02:15 – Todd Gill (1)
Ed Belfour 37 saves / 38 shots		Goalie stats		Felix Potvin 32 saves / 32 shots

April 23	Toronto Maple Leafs	4–5	Chicago Blackhawks	Chicago Stadium	Recap
Dave Ellett (1) – pp – 10:15; Bill Berg (1) – 17:02		First period	00:49 – Tony Amonte (1); 02:07 – pp – Tony Amonte (2); 07:23 – Joe Murphy (1)
Dmitri Mironov (1) – pp – 01:00		Second period	15:58 – Tony Amonte (3)
Dave Ellett (2) – pp – 06:35		Third period	01:31 – Tony Amonte (4)
Felix Potvin 28 saves / 33 shots		Goalie stats	Ed Belfour 29 saves / 33 shots

April 24	Toronto Maple Leafs	3–4	OT	Chicago Blackhawks	Chicago Stadium	Recap
Doug Gilmour (2) – pp – 14:55		First period		09:55 – Gary Suter (1); 13:28 – pp – Gary Suter (2)
Dave Andreychuk (2) – pp – 14:40		Second period		No scoring
Robert Pearson (1) – 02:59		Third period		12:35 – pp – Gary Suter (3)
No scoring		First overtime period		01:23 – Jeremy Roenick (1)
Felix Potvin 25 saves / 29 shots		Goalie stats		Ed Belfour 34 saves / 37 shots

April 26	Chicago Blackhawks	0–1	Toronto Maple Leafs	Maple Leaf Gardens	Recap
No scoring		First period	No scoring
No scoring		Second period	No scoring
No scoring		Third period	10:07 – pp – Mike Eastwood (1)
Ed Belfour 36 saves / 37 shots		Goalie stats	Felix Potvin 17 saves / 17 shots

April 28	Toronto Maple Leafs	1–0	Chicago Blackhawks	Chicago Stadium	Recap
Mike Gartner (1) – pp – 14:49		First period	No scoring
No scoring		Second period	No scoring
No scoring		Third period	No scoring
Felix Potvin 27 saves / 27 shots		Goalie stats	Ed Belfour 17 saves / 18 shots

Toronto won series 4–2

==== (4) Dallas Stars vs. (5) St. Louis Blues ====
The Dallas Stars entered the playoffs as the fourth seed in the Western Conference with 97 points. The St. Louis Blues earned 91 points during the regular season to finish fifth overall in the Western Conference. This was the tenth playoff meeting between these two teams, with St. Louis winning five of the nine previous series. They last met in the 1991 Norris Division Finals which the then Minnesota North Stars won in six games. Dallas won the season series earning seven of twelve points during this year's six game regular season series. This was the first time the city of Dallas was represented in the Stanley Cup playoffs.

Game four was the last game played at the St. Louis Arena.

April 17	St. Louis Blues	3–5	Dallas Stars	Reunion Arena	Recap
No scoring		First period	No scoring
Alexei Kasatonov (1) – 14:06		Second period	03:50 – pp – Dave Gagner (1); 05:15 – pp – Brent Gilchrist (1); 15:31 – Brent Gilchrist (2)
Brett Hull (1) – pp – 05:10; Phil Housley (1) – pp – 14:39		Third period	16:11 – Grant Ledyard (1); 18:23 – Trent Klatt (1)
Curtis Joseph 40 saves / 45 shots		Goalie stats	Darcy Wakaluk 33 saves / 36 shots

April 20	St. Louis Blues	2–4	Dallas Stars	Reunion Arena	Recap
Brendan Shanahan (1) – 02:06		First period	No scoring
Brett Hull (2) – 07:01		Second period	04:25 – Mike Modano (1); 04:47 – Russ Courtnall (1)
No scoring		Third period	02:58 – Mike Modano (2); 19:49 – en – Dave Gagner (2)
Curtis Joseph 47 saves / 50 shots		Goalie stats	Darcy Wakaluk 24 saves / 26 shots

April 22	Dallas Stars	5–4	OT	St. Louis Blues	St. Louis Arena	Recap
No scoring		First period		05:29 – Brendan Shanahan (2)
Trent Klatt (2) – pp – 02:33; Shane Churla (1) – pp – 07:38; Mike Modano (3) – 09:57		Second period		04:11 – sh – Kevin Miller (1)
Dave Gagner (3) – 15:11		Third period		13:47 – Craig Janney (1); 19:31 – Alexei Kasatonov (2)
Paul Cavallini (1) – pp – 08:34		First overtime period		No scoring
Darcy Wakaluk 44 saves / 48 shots		Goalie stats		Curtis Joseph 26 saves / 31 shots

April 24	Dallas Stars	2–1	St. Louis Blues	St. Louis Arena	Recap
No scoring		First period	07:22 – pp – Phil Housley (2)
Mike Modano (4) – 15:47		Second period	No scoring
Mike Modano (5) – pp – 16:13		Third period	No scoring
Darcy Wakaluk 25 saves / 26 shots		Goalie stats	Curtis Joseph 30 saves / 32 shots

Dallas won series 4–0

== Conference semifinals ==
=== Eastern Conference semifinals ===
==== (1) New York Rangers vs. (7) Washington Capitals ====
This was the fourth playoff meeting between these two teams, with Washington winning two of the previous three series. They last met in the 1991 Patrick Division Semifinals, which Washington won in six games. New York won five of the six games in this year's regular season series.

Brian Leetch's goal with 3:28 left in the third period of game five won the series for the Rangers and sent them to the conference finals for the first time since 1986.

May 1	Washington Capitals	3–6	New York Rangers	Madison Square Garden	Recap
Michal Pivonka (4) – 04:13		First period	03:51 – Stephane Matteau (2); 16:28 – Brian Noonan (2)
Kelly Miller (2) – pp – 08:51		Second period	12:47 – pp – Brian Leetch (3); 15:45 – Brian Noonan (3)
Mike Ridley (3) – 13:32		Third period	03:06 – Greg Gilbert (1); 14:30 – Mark Messier (5)
Don Beaupre 18 saves / 24 shots		Goalie stats	Mike Richter 27 saves / 30 shots

May 3	Washington Capitals	2–5	New York Rangers	Madison Square Garden	Recap
Kevin Hatcher (2) – 08:10		First period	16:42 – Joey Kocur (1)
Mike Ridley (4) – 04:35		Second period	01:38 – Sergei Zubov (3); 10:44 – Esa Tikkanen (2)
No scoring		Third period	10:47 – Adam Graves (4); 11:06 – Stephane Matteau (3)
Rick Tabaracci 20 saves / 25 shots		Goalie stats	Mike Richter 22 saves / 24 shots

May 5	New York Rangers	3–0	Washington Capitals	USAir Arena	Recap
Brian Leetch (4) – pp – 04:35; Mark Messier (6) – pp – 13:57		First period	No scoring
Steve Larmer (3) – 06:06		Second period	No scoring
No scoring		Third period	No scoring
Mike Richter 21 saves / 21 shots		Goalie stats	Don Beaupre 18 saves / 21 shots

May 7	New York Rangers	2–4	Washington Capitals	USAir Arena	Recap
Adam Graves (5) – 00:33		First period	07:26 – Todd Krygier (1)
No scoring		Second period	08:26 – pp – Joe Juneau (4); 10:22 – Jason Woolley (1); 15:26 – Todd Krygier (2)
Brian Noonan (4) – pp – 17:16		Third period	No scoring
Mike Richter 16 saves / 20 shots Glenn Healy 3 saves / 3 shots		Goalie stats	Don Beaupre 25 saves / 27 shots

May 9	Washington Capitals	3–4	New York Rangers	Madison Square Garden	Recap
Kevin Hatcher (3) – sh – 05:33; Shawn Anderson (1) – 16:20		First period	01:46 – Adam Graves (6); 08:01 – Adam Graves (7); 08:56 – Esa Tikkanen (3)
No scoring		Second period	No scoring
Sylvain Cote (1) – 00:27		Third period	16:32 – Brian Leetch (5)
Rick Tabaracci 24 saves / 25 shots Don Beaupre 8 saves / 11 shots		Goalie stats	Mike Richter 28 saves / 31 shots

New York won series 4–1

==== (3) New Jersey Devils vs. (4) Boston Bruins ====
This was the second playoff meeting between these two teams. Their only previous meeting was in the 1988 Prince of Wales Conference Final, which Boston won in seven games. These teams split their four-game regular season series.

May 1	Boston Bruins	2–1	New Jersey Devils	Brendan Byrne Arena	Recap
Bryan Smolinski (3) – 05:02; David Shaw (1) – 07:22		First period	13:22 – pp – Bernie Nicholls (1)
No scoring		Second period	No scoring
No scoring		Third period	No scoring
Jon Casey 34 saves / 35 shots		Goalie stats	Martin Brodeur 27 saves / 29 shots

May 3	Boston Bruins	6–5	OT	New Jersey Devils	Brendan Byrne Arena	Recap
Bryan Smolinski (4) – 13:08		First period		02:23 – Valeri Zelepukin (1); 16:25 – Randy McKay (1)
Glen Wesley (2) – 09:03		Second period		04:09 – pp – Scott Stevens (2)
Al Iafrate (2) – 06:17; Ted Donato (4) – pp – 11:37; Steve Heinze (2) – 13:55		Third period		08:27 – Jim Dowd (1); 19:56 – Bruce Driver (3)
Don Sweeney (2) – 09:08		First overtime period		No scoring
Jon Casey 26 saves / 31 shots		Goalie stats		Martin Brodeur 21 saves / 27 shots

May 5	New Jersey Devils	4–2	Boston Bruins	Boston Garden	Recap
Jim Dowd (2) – 12:27		First period	08:39 – Mariusz Czerkawski (2)
Tommy Albelin (2) – pp – 14:36		Second period	No scoring
Tom Chorske (1) – 03:17; Tom Chorske (2) – 19:08		Third period	09:13 – pp – Al Iafrate (3)
Chris Terreri 25 saves / 27 shots		Goalie stats	Jon Casey 21 saves / 25 shots

May 7	New Jersey Devils	5–4	OT	Boston Bruins	Boston Garden	Recap
Valeri Zelepukin (2) – 08:47		First period		15:06 – Glen Murray (3)
Stephane Richer (4) – pp – 06:15		Second period		10:07 – Brent Hughes (2); 15:25 – pp – Ray Bourque (2)
Ben Hankinson (1) – 01:44; Bernie Nicholls (2) – 12:12		Third period		10:31 – Glen Murray (4)
Stephane Richer (5) – 14:19		First overtime period		No scoring
Chris Terreri 38 saves / 42 shots		Goalie stats		Jon Casey 29 saves / 34 shots

May 9	Boston Bruins	0–2	New Jersey Devils	Brendan Byrne Arena	Recap
No scoring		First period	No scoring
No scoring		Second period	01:23 – Corey Millen (1); 19:38 – Bobby Carpenter (1)
No scoring		Third period	No scoring
Jon Casey 21 saves / 23 shots		Goalie stats	Martin Brodeur 22 saves / 22 shots

May 11	New Jersey Devils	5–3	Boston Bruins	Boston Garden	Recap
No scoring		First period	No scoring
John MacLean (4) – 07:38; Scott Niedermayer (1) – pp – 15:12; Claude Lemieux (5) – 18:06		Second period	18:31 – Mariusz Czerkawski (3)
John MacLean (5) – 04:37; Tom Chorske (3) – 19:02		Third period	01:39 – Glen Wesley (3); 02:08 – Bryan Smolinski (5)
Chris Terreri 38 saves / 41 shots		Goalie stats	Jon Casey 18 saves / 23 shots

New Jersey won series 4–2

=== Western Conference semifinals ===
==== (3) Toronto Maple Leafs vs. (8) San Jose Sharks ====
This was the first playoff meeting between these two teams. San Jose won the season series earning four of eight points during this year's four game regular season series.

May 2	San Jose Sharks	3–2	Toronto Maple Leafs	Maple Leaf Gardens	Recap
Igor Larionov (3) – 07:09		First period	02:31 – Wendel Clark (1)
Pat Falloon (1) – 15:38		Second period	07:15 – Mark Osborne (1)
Johan Garpenlov (3) – 17:44		Third period	No scoring
Arturs Irbe 29 saves / 31 shots		Goalie stats	Felix Potvin 26 saves / 29 shots

May 4	San Jose Sharks	1–5	Toronto Maple Leafs	Maple Leaf Gardens	Recap
No scoring		First period	08:06 – pp – Dmitri Mironov (2)
No scoring		Second period	09:31 – Mike Gartner (2); 13:29 – sh – Mark Osborne (2)
Gaetan Duchesne (1) – 15:04		Third period	03:25 – pp – Doug Gilmour (3); 11:11 – pp – Wendel Clark (2)
Arturs Irbe 33 saves / 38 shots		Goalie stats	Felix Potvin 19 saves / 20 shots

May 6	Toronto Maple Leafs	2–5	San Jose Sharks	San Jose Arena	Recap
Nikolai Borschevsky (1) – 07:50		First period	03:21 – Bob Errey (2)
Nikolai Borschevsky (2) – pp – 16:59		Second period	00:29 – Jamie Baker (3); 01:58 – Ulf Dahlen (4); 14:25 – pp – Ulf Dahlen (5)
No scoring		Third period	17:38 – Ulf Dahlen (6)
Felix Potvin 22 saves / 27 shots Damian Rhodes 0 saves / 0 shots		Goalie stats	Arturs Irbe 19 saves / 21 shots

May 8	Toronto Maple Leafs	8–3	San Jose Sharks	San Jose Arena	Recap
Dmitri Mironov (3) – pp – 10:15; Mike Eastwood (2) – 16:06; Dave Andreychuk (3) – 18:47		First period	No scoring
Wendel Clark (4) – 05:58; Doug Gilmour (4) – pp – 09:13; Mike Gartner (3) – 18:38		Second period	04:48 – pp – Todd Elik (2)
Dave Andreychuk (4) – sh – 00:32; Mark Osborne (3) – sh – 18:51		Third period	09:05 – Todd Elik (3); 14:15 – sh – Rob Gaudreau (2)
Felix Potvin 27 saves / 30 shots		Goalie stats	Arturs Irbe 19 saves / 25 shots Jimmy Waite 7 saves / 9 shots

May 10	Toronto Maple Leafs	2–5	San Jose Sharks	San Jose Arena	Recap
Dmitri Mironov (4) – pp – 07:07		First period	01:17 – Sergei Makarov (7); 13:01 – pp – Bob Errey (3); 15:03 – Sergei Makarov (8)
Mike Gartner (4) – 06:34		Second period	02:33 – Johan Garpenlov (4); 14:21 – Todd Elik (4)
No scoring		Third period	No scoring
Felix Potvin 22 saves / 27 shots		Goalie stats	Arturs Irbe 27 saves / 29 shots

May 12	San Jose Sharks	2–3	OT	Toronto Maple Leafs	Maple Leaf Gardens	Recap
No scoring		First period		05:26 – Wendel Clark (5)
Igor Larionov (4) – 08:43		Second period		No scoring
Jeff Norton (1) – 07:38		Third period		05:32 – pp – Wendel Clark (6)
No scoring		First overtime period		08:53 – Mike Gartner (5)
Arturs Irbe 21 saves / 24 shots		Goalie stats		Felix Potvin 20 saves / 22 shots

May 14	San Jose Sharks	2–4	Toronto Maple Leafs	Maple Leaf Gardens	Recap
No scoring		First period	08:58 – Wendel Clark (7)
No scoring		Second period	09:30 – Wendel Clark (8)
Igor Larionov (5) – 05:21; Todd Elik (5) – 19:56		Third period	03:19 – Mark Osborne (4); 12:15 – Doug Gilmour (5)
Arturs Irbe 17 saves / 21 shots		Goalie stats	Felix Potvin 30 saves / 32 shots

Toronto won series 4–3

==== (4) Dallas Stars vs. (7) Vancouver Canucks ====
This was the first playoff meeting between these two teams. Dallas won three of the four games in this year's regular season series.

May 2	Vancouver Canucks	6–4	Dallas Stars	Reunion Arena	Recap
Murray Craven (1) – 01:58; Geoff Courtnall (5) – 05:15		First period	11:38 – Paul Broten (1)
Pavel Bure (4) – 01:23; Jyrki Lumme (1) – pp – 10:23		Second period	13:40 – pp – Richard Matvichuk (1); 14:14 – Mike McPhee (1)
Martin Gelinas (3) – 15:21; Trevor Linden (5) – en – 19:45		Third period	03:57 – Mike McPhee (2)
Kirk McLean 35 saves / 39 shots		Goalie stats	Darcy Wakaluk 27 saves / 32 shots

May 4	Vancouver Canucks	3–0	Dallas Stars	Reunion Arena	Recap
Cliff Ronning (3) – 03:50; Pavel Bure (5) – 17:20		First period	No scoring
Pavel Bure (6) – 19:39		Second period	No scoring
No scoring		Third period	No scoring
Kirk McLean 39 saves / 39 shots		Goalie stats	Andy Moog 27 saves / 30 shots

May 6	Dallas Stars	4–3	Vancouver Canucks	Pacific Coliseum	Recap
Dave Gagner (4) – pp – 17:09; Neal Broten (1) – 18:00		First period	01:05 – pp – Trevor Linden (6); 09:26 – pp – Pavel Bure (7)
Mike Modano (6) – 03:10; Neal Broten (2) – 08:17		Second period	09:52 – Trevor Linden (7)
No scoring		Third period	No scoring
Andy Moog 21 saves / 24 shots		Goalie stats	Kirk McLean 32 saves / 36 shots

May 8	Dallas Stars	1–2	OT	Vancouver Canucks	Pacific Coliseum	Recap
No scoring		First period		02:09 – Trevor Linden (8)
Brent Gilchrist (3) – 15:11		Second period		No scoring
No scoring		Third period		No scoring
No scoring		First overtime period		11:01 – Sergio Momesso (2)
Andy Moog 32 saves / 34 shots		Goalie stats		Kirk McLean 37 saves / 38 shots

May 10	Dallas Stars	2–4	Vancouver Canucks	Pacific Coliseum	Recap
Mike Modano (7) – pp – 17:41		First period	07:04 – Nathan LaFayette (1); 09:32 – pp – Pavel Bure (8)
No scoring		Second period	05:10 – Murray Craven (2)
Dave Gagner (5) – pp – 18:09		Third period	16:34 – Pavel Bure (9)
Andy Moog 29 saves / 33 shots		Goalie stats	Kirk McLean 28 saves / 30 shots

Vancouver won series 4–1

== Conference finals ==
=== Eastern Conference final ===
==== (1) New York Rangers vs. (3) New Jersey Devils ====
This was the second playoff meeting between these two teams, with New York winning the only previous series. They last met in the 1992 Patrick Division Semifinals, which New York won in seven games. New York made their third Semifinals/Conference Final appearance since the league began using a 16-team or greater playoff format in 1980. They were defeated in five games by the Montreal Canadiens in their most recent Conference Finals appearance in 1986. New Jersey made their second appearance in the Conference Final. Their most recent appearance was in the 1988 Prince of Wales Conference Final, which New Jersey lost against the Boston Bruins in seven games. New York won all six games in this year's regular season series. This was the first Wales/Eastern Conference Final since 1985 not to involve either the Boston Bruins and Montreal Canadiens.

With a minute remaining in game one at Madison Square Garden, New York was leading 3–2. However, Devils forward Claude Lemieux tied the game on a scramble in front of New York goaltender Mike Richter. The Devils went on to win the game on Stephane Richer's breakaway goal at 15:23 of the second overtime. The Rangers evened the series winning game two in a 4–0 shutout. The series then turned to the Meadowlands in East Rutherford, New Jersey, for games three and four. Like game one, game three went into double overtime but this time it was New York who won 3–2 on Stephane Matteau's goal at 6:13 of the second overtime period. The Devils won game four by a final score of 3–1 and evened the series at 2–2. The Devils took the series lead with a 4–1 win at Madison Square Garden in game five.

Despite the fact that his team trailed in the series 3–2, Rangers captain Mark Messier made a highly publicized guarantee that New York would win game six. After trailing New Jersey by a score of 2–1 after two periods Messier himself scored a third-period hat trick to rally the Rangers to a 4–2 victory. Rangers coach Mike Keenan said of the guarantee, "Mark was sending a message to his teammates that he believed together we could win. He put on an amazing performance to make sure it happened."

Game seven played at Madison Square Garden, was a goaltending battle between New Jersey's Martin Brodeur and New York's Mike Richter. Brian Leetch gave the Rangers a 1–0 lead in the second period. Richter shut out the Devils for over 59 minutes before conceding a goal to Devils forward Valeri Zelepukin with just 7.7 seconds remaining in regulation. The two teams played into double overtime for the third time in the series and for the second time in the series it was Stephane Matteau who scored the game winner. Matteau scored on a wrap-around at 4:24 of the second overtime period as the Rangers won the game 2–1 and the series 4–3. Many consider this one of the greatest hockey playoff series of all time.

May 15	New Jersey Devils	4–3	2OT	New York Rangers	Madison Square Garden	Recap
John MacLean (6) – 18:16		First period		03:39 – Sergei Zubov (4)
No scoring		Second period		17:50 – Sergei Nemchinov (1)
Bill Guerin (1) – 05:50; Claude Lemieux (6) – 19:17		Third period		11:05 – pp – Steve Larmer (4)
Stephane Richer (6) – 15:23		Second overtime period		No scoring
Martin Brodeur 35 saves / 38 shots		Goalie stats		Mike Richter 44 saves / 48 shots

May 17	New Jersey Devils	0–4	New York Rangers	Madison Square Garden	Recap
No scoring		First period	01:13 – Mark Messier (7)
No scoring		Second period	No scoring
No scoring		Third period	00:47 – Sergei Nemchinov (2); 06:11 – Glenn Anderson (1); 08:38 – pp – Adam Graves (8)
Martin Brodeur 36 saves / 40 shots Chris Terreri 1 save / 1 shots		Goalie stats	Mike Richter 16 saves / 16 shots

May 19	New York Rangers	3–2	2OT	New Jersey Devils	Brendan Byrne Arena	Recap
Adam Graves (9) – 02:43		First period		05:38 – Viacheslav Fetisov (1)
Steve Larmer (5) – pp – 09:35		Second period		15:50 – pp – Valeri Zelepukin (3)
No scoring		Third period		No scoring
Stephane Matteau (4) – 06:13		Second overtime period		No scoring
Mike Richter 29 saves / 31 shots		Goalie stats		Martin Brodeur 47 saves / 50 shots

May 21	New York Rangers	1–3	New Jersey Devils	Brendan Byrne Arena	Recap
No scoring		First period	10:17 – pp – Stephane Richer (7); 16:54 – Bill Guerin (2)
Stephane Matteau (5) – pp – 08:47		Second period	No scoring
No scoring		Third period	13:18 – Valeri Zelepukin (4)
Glenn Healy 13 saves / 14 shots Mike Richter 9 saves / 11 shots		Goalie stats	Martin Brodeur 21 saves / 22 shots

May 23	New Jersey Devils	4–1	New York Rangers	Madison Square Garden	Recap
Bernie Nicholls (3) – sh – 06:49		First period	No scoring
No scoring		Second period	No scoring
Mike Peluso (1) – 02:36; Bernie Nicholls (4) – pp – 10:37; Tom Chorske (4) – 13:58		Third period	16:33 – Esa Tikkanen (4)
Martin Brodeur 25 saves / 26 shots		Goalie stats	Mike Richter 22 saves / 26 shots

May 25	New York Rangers	4–2	New Jersey Devils	Brendan Byrne Arena	Recap
No scoring		First period	08:03 – Scott Niedermayer (2); 17:32 – Claude Lemieux (7)
Alexei Kovalev (5) – 18:19		Second period	No scoring
Mark Messier (8) – 02:48; Mark Messier (9) – 12:12; Mark Messier (10) – sh – en – 18:15		Third period	No scoring
Mike Richter 28 saves / 30 shots		Goalie stats	Martin Brodeur 32 saves / 35 shots

May 27	New Jersey Devils	1–2	2OT	New York Rangers	Madison Square Garden	Recap
No scoring		First period		No scoring
No scoring		Second period		09:31 – Brian Leetch (6)
Valeri Zelepukin (5) – 19:52		Third period		No scoring
No scoring		Second overtime period		04:24 – Stephane Matteau (6)
Martin Brodeur 46 saves / 48 shots		Goalie stats		Mike Richter 31 saves / 32 shots

New York won series 4–3

=== Western Conference final ===
==== (3) Toronto Maple Leafs vs. (7) Vancouver Canucks ====
This was the first and to date only playoff series between these two teams. Toronto made their second consecutive and second overall Conference Final appearance. They were defeated in seven games by the Los Angeles Kings in the previous year. Vancouver made their second appearance in the Conference Final. Their most recent appearance was in the 1982 Clarence Campbell Conference Final, which Vancouver won against the Chicago Black Hawks in five games. These teams split their four-game regular season series. This remains the last Conference Finals series to be played entirely in Canada by two Canadian-based teams.

Toronto won game one at Maple Leaf Gardens on Peter Zezel's goal at 16:55 of the first overtime period. After that, however, the Maple Leafs could not seem to slow down the bigger, more powerful Canucks. Vancouver edged Toronto 4–3 in game two and then shut out the Maple Leafs at the Pacific Coliseum in games three and four by scores of 4–0 and 2–0 respectively. Down three games to one and facing elimination, the Maple Leafs played much better in game five, leading 3–0 after the first period. However, Vancouver would come back scoring three goals in the second period and push the game into overtime, where Vancouver forward Greg Adams beat Leafs goaltender Felix Potvin just 14 seconds into the second overtime period to give the Canucks a 4–3 win and a 4–1 series win.

May 16	Vancouver Canucks	2–3	OT	Toronto Maple Leafs	Maple Leaf Gardens	Recap
No scoring		First period		No scoring
Dave Babych (2) – 08:52		Second period		04:26 – pp – Dave Andreychuk (5)
Trevor Linden (9) – pp – 19:30		Third period		00:38 – Peter Zezel (1)
No scoring		First overtime period		16:55 – Peter Zezel (2)
Kirk McLean 34 saves / 37 shots		Goalie stats		Felix Potvin 31 saves / 33 shots

May 18	Vancouver Canucks	4–3	Toronto Maple Leafs	Maple Leaf Gardens	Recap
Pavel Bure (10) – 18:43		First period	No scoring
Jeff Brown (3) – pp – 09:55; Murray Craven (3) – 10:31		Second period	04:38 – pp – Dmitri Mironov (5); 06:21 – pp – Dmitri Mironov (6)
Jyrki Lumme (2) – pp – 15:46		Third period	04:37 – pp – Dave Ellett (3)
Kirk McLean 37 saves / 40 shots		Goalie stats	Felix Potvin 35 saves / 39 shots

May 20	Toronto Maple Leafs	0–4	Vancouver Canucks	Pacific Coliseum	Recap
No scoring		First period	13:25 – Pavel Bure (11)
No scoring		Second period	04:56 – pp – Greg Adams (3)
No scoring		Third period	15:49 – Pavel Bure (12); 19:37 – pp – Martin Gelinas (4)
Felix Potvin 24 saves / 28 shots		Goalie stats	Kirk McLean 29 saves / 29 shots

May 22	Toronto Maple Leafs	0–2	Vancouver Canucks	Pacific Coliseum	Recap
No scoring		First period	No scoring
No scoring		Second period	No scoring
No scoring		Third period	17:35 – Cliff Ronning (4); 19:27 – Pavel Bure (13)
Felix Potvin 19 saves / 20 shots		Goalie stats	Kirk McLean 29 saves / 29 shots

May 24	Toronto Maple Leafs	3–4	2OT	Vancouver Canucks	Pacific Coliseum	Recap
Mike Eastwood (3) – 07:54; Doug Gilmour (6) – pp – 11:37; Wendel Clark (9) – 12:19		First period		No scoring
No scoring		Second period		01:34 – Murray Craven (4); 09:37 – Nathan LaFayette (2); 17:57 – pp – Greg Adams (4)
No scoring		Third period		No scoring
No scoring		Second overtime period		00:14 – Greg Adams (5)
Felix Potvin 43 saves / 47 shots		Goalie stats		Kirk McLean 31 saves / 34 shots

Vancouver won series 4–1

== Stanley Cup Final ==
This was the first and to date only playoff series between these two teams. This was Vancouver's second appearance in the Final; in their last Final appearance they were swept by the Islanders in 1982. The Rangers were making their tenth appearance in the Finals and first since losing in five games to Montreal in 1979. The Rangers last won the Stanley Cup in 1940. With the Rangers having 112 points against Vancouver's 85, the 27 point difference was the largest point differential between two teams in the Stanley Cup Final since 1982 when 41 points separated the New York Islanders (118) and Vancouver (77). New York won both games in this year's regular season series.

In a back and forth series that went the maximum seven games, one lengthy drought ended and another began. The Rangers won the Stanley Cup for their fourth title in franchise history, and first since 1940, while the Canucks were the last Canadian team to play for the Stanley Cup until the 2004 Calgary Flames. This was the longest streak that Canadian teams did not qualify for the Final from 1995 to 2003 (nine years). Prior to this the longest streak of Canadian teams missing the Final was just three years.

May 31	Vancouver Canucks	3–2	OT	New York Rangers	Madison Square Garden	Recap
No scoring		First period		03:32 – Steve Larmer (6)
No scoring		Second period		No scoring
Bret Hedican (1) – 05:45; Martin Gelinas (5) – 19:00		Third period		08:29 – Alexei Kovalev (6)
Greg Adams (6) – 19:26		First overtime period		No scoring
Kirk McLean 52 saves / 54 shots		Goalie stats		Mike Richter 28 saves / 31 shots

June 2	Vancouver Canucks	1–3	New York Rangers	Madison Square Garden	Recap
Sergio Momesso (3) – 14:04		First period	06:22 – Doug Lidster (1)
No scoring		Second period	11:42 – sh – Glenn Anderson (2)
No scoring		Third period	19:55 – en – Brian Leetch (7)
Kirk McLean 37 saves / 39 shots		Goalie stats	Mike Richter 28 saves / 29 shots

June 4	New York Rangers	5–1	Vancouver Canucks	Pacific Coliseum	Recap
Brian Leetch (8) – 13:39; Glenn Anderson (3) – 19:19		First period	01:03 – Pavel Bure (14)
Brian Leetch (9) – 18:32		Second period	No scoring
Steve Larmer (7) – 00:25; Alexei Kovalev (7) – pp – 13:03		Third period	No scoring
Mike Richter 24 saves / 25 shots		Goalie stats	Kirk McLean 20 saves / 25 shots

June 7	New York Rangers	4–2	Vancouver Canucks	Pacific Coliseum	Recap
No scoring		First period	13:25 – pp – Trevor Linden (10); 16:19 – Cliff Ronning (5)
Brian Leetch (10) – 04:03; Sergei Zubov (5) – pp – 19:44		Second period	No scoring
Alexei Kovalev (8) – pp – 15:05; Steve Larmer (8) – 17:56		Third period	No scoring
Mike Richter 28 saves / 30 shots		Goalie stats	Kirk McLean 23 saves / 27 shots

June 9	Vancouver Canucks	6–3	New York Rangers	Madison Square Garden	Recap
No scoring		First period	No scoring
Jeff Brown (4) – 08:10		Second period	No scoring
Geoff Courtnall (6) – 00:26; Pavel Bure (15) – 02:48; Dave Babych (3) – 09:31; Geoff Courtnall (7) – 12:20; Pavel Bure (16) – 13:04		Third period	03:27 – Doug Lidster (2); 06:20 – Steve Larmer (9); 09:02 – Mark Messier (11)
Kirk McLean 35 saves / 38 shots		Goalie stats	Mike Richter 31 saves / 37 shots

June 11	New York Rangers	1–4	Vancouver Canucks	Pacific Coliseum	Recap
No scoring		First period	09:42 – pp – Jeff Brown (5)
Alexei Kovalev (9) – pp – 14:42		Second period	12:29 – Geoff Courtnall (8)
No scoring		Third period	08:35 – Jeff Brown (6); 18:28 – Geoff Courtnall (9)
Mike Richter 27 saves / 31 shots		Goalie stats	Kirk McLean 28 saves / 29 shots

June 14	Vancouver Canucks	2–3	New York Rangers	Madison Square Garden	Recap
No scoring		First period	11:02 – Brian Leetch (11); 14:45 – pp – Adam Graves (10)
Trevor Linden (11) – sh – 05:21		Second period	13:29 – pp – Mark Messier (12)
Trevor Linden (12) – pp – 04:50		Third period	No scoring
Kirk McLean 32 saves / 35 shots		Goalie stats	Mike Richter 28 saves / 30 shots

New York won series 4–3

== Playoff statistics ==
=== Skaters ===
These are the top ten skaters based on points.

Player	Team	GP	G	A	Pts	+/–	PIM
Brian Leetch	New York Rangers	23	11	23	34	+19	6
Pavel Bure	Vancouver Canucks	24	16	15	31	+8	40
Mark Messier	New York Rangers	23	12	18	30	+14	33
Doug Gilmour	Toronto Maple Leafs	18	6	22	28	+3	42
Trevor Linden	Vancouver Canucks	24	12	13	25	+3	18
Alexei Kovalev	New York Rangers	23	9	12	21	+5	18
Geoff Courtnall	Vancouver Canucks	24	9	10	19	+10	51
Sergei Zubov	New York Rangers	22	5	14	19	+10	0
Claude Lemieux	New Jersey Devils	20	7	11	18	+4	44
Igor Larionov	San Jose Sharks	14	5	13	18	-1	10

=== Goaltenders ===
This is a combined table of the top five goaltenders based on goals against average and the top five goaltenders based on save percentage, with at least 420 minutes played. The table is sorted by GAA, and the criteria for inclusion are bolded.

Player	Team	GP	W	L	SA	GA	GAA	SV%	SO	TOI
Dominik Hasek	Buffalo Sabres	7	3	4	261	13	**1.61**	**.950**	2	483:34
Martin Brodeur	New Jersey Devils	17	8	9	531	38	**1.95**	**.928**	1	1170:40
Mike Richter	New York Rangers	23	16	7	623	49	**2.07**	**.921**	4	1417:29
Kirk McLean	Vancouver Canucks	24	15	9	820	59	**2.29**	**.928**	4	1543:45
Felix Potvin	Toronto Maple Leafs	18	9	9	520	46	**2.46**	**.912**	3	1123:57

== See also ==
- List of Stanley Cup champions
- 1994 NHL entry draft
- 1994 in sports

Preceded by 1993 Stanley Cup playoffs	Stanley Cup playoffs	Succeeded by 1995 Stanley Cup playoffs
