= Stefan Matteau =

American ice hockey player (born 1994)

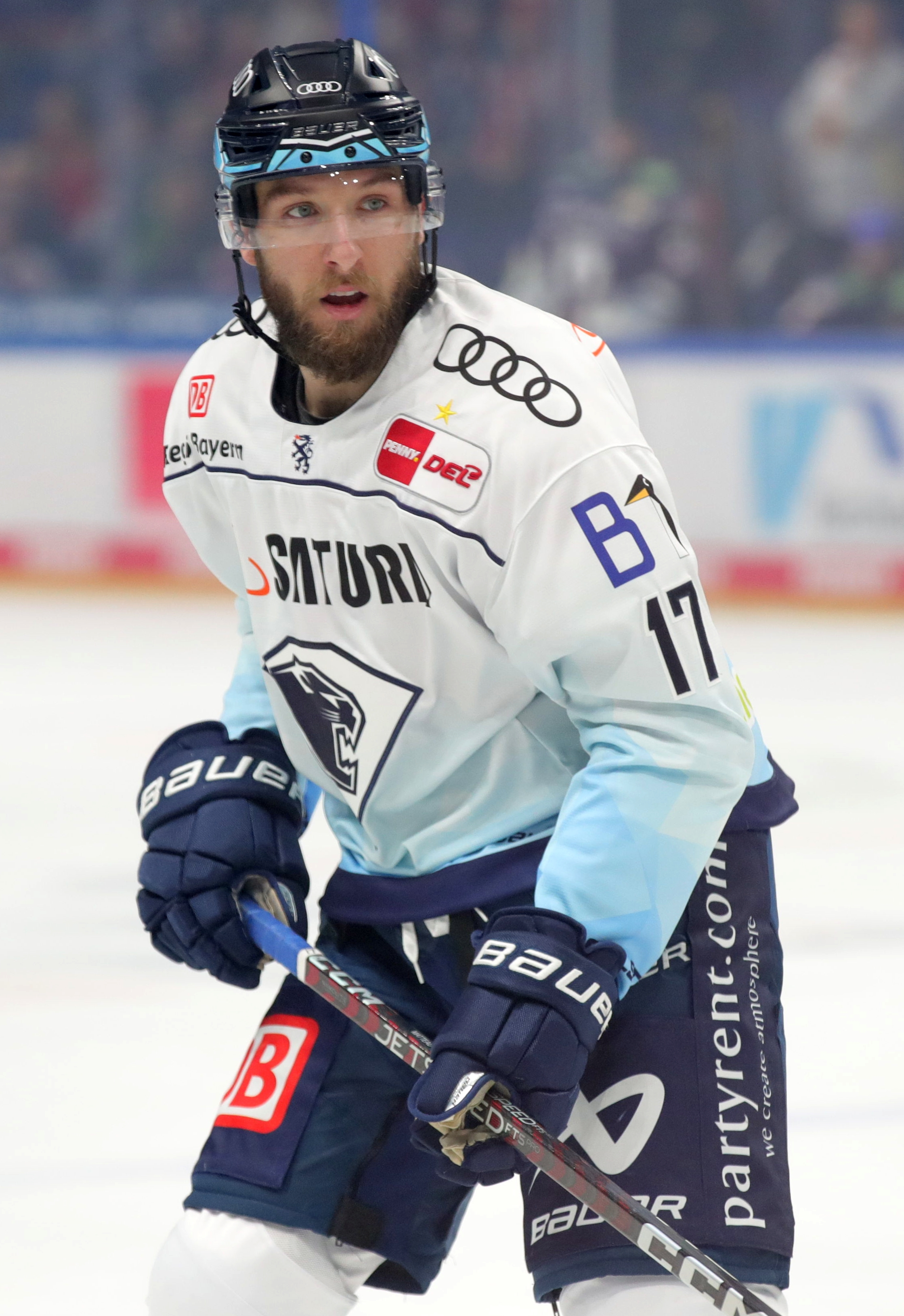
- Matteau with the ERC Ingolstadt in 2022
- Born: February 23, 1994 (age 32) Chicago, Illinois, U.S.
- Height: 6 ft 1 in (185 cm)
- Weight: 216 lb (98 kg; 15 st 6 lb)
- Position: Left wing
- Shot: Left
- Played for: New Jersey Devils; Montreal Canadiens; Vegas Golden Knights; Columbus Blue Jackets; Colorado Avalanche; Linköping HC; ERC Ingolstadt
- NHL draft: 29th overall, 2012; New Jersey Devils
- Playing career: 2013–2025

Stefan Matteau (born February 23, 1994) is a Canadian-American former professional ice hockey forward, who played in the National Hockey League (NHL). Matteau was born in Chicago, Illinois, but grew up in Blainville, Quebec.

== Playing career ==
Matteau was drafted 29th overall in the 2012 NHL Draft by the New Jersey Devils. He is described as a rugged power forward who plays a hard-nose style. Matteau debuted for the Devils on January 19, 2013, against the New York Islanders.

Matteau signed an entry-level contract with the Devils on August 14, 2012. He played in his sixth NHL game on February 7, 2013, against the Tampa Bay Lightning, making his contract take effect.

Matteau recorded both his first career NHL point and goal at 16:31 into the second period on February 9, 2013, against Marc-André Fleury of the Pittsburgh Penguins at the Prudential Center.

During the 2015–16 season, having been unable to attain a regular forward role, Matteau was traded by the Devils to the Montreal Canadiens in exchange for Devante Smith-Pelly on February 29, 2016.

On July 1, 2017, Matteau as a free agent signed a one-year, two-way deal the Vegas Golden Knights.

After two seasons within the Golden Knights organization, Matteau left Vegas as a free agent. On August 22, 2019, Matteau was signed to a one-year AHL contract with the Cleveland Monsters, affiliate to the Columbus Blue Jackets. Serving in a leadership role with the Monsters, Matteau registered 12 goals and 28 points through 50 games in the 2019–20 season, before he was signed to a two-year, two-way contract with the Blue Jackets on February 19, 2020, and was immediately recalled to join the Blue Jackets in his return to the NHL. He scored his first NHL goal in more than four years in his first game with the Blue Jackets on February 20, 2020, against the Philadelphia Flyers, the same team he had scored his last NHL goal on December 4, 2015, while a member of the New Jersey Devils.

On July 29, 2021, having left the Blue Jackets organization, Matteau was signed as a free agent to a one-year, two-way contract with the Colorado Avalanche. After attending the 2021 Avalanche training camp, Matteau was originally reassigned to AHL affiliate, the Colorado Eagles. Before making an appearance with the Eagles, Matteau was recalled by the Avalanche and made his debut in the second game of the 2021–22 season on October 16, 2021, against the St. Louis Blues. During the first-period and featuring on Colorado's fourth-line, Matteau suffered a high ankle sprain which subsequently ruled him out long-term.

Returning to health after four-months on the injured reserve, Matteau was reassigned to the AHL and made his Eagles debut on February 26, 2022. Remaining with the Eagles for the remainder of the campaign, Matteau added a veteran presence and contributed with 10 points through 20 games. He added 3 goals in the playoffs with the Colorado Eagles, before falling in the Pacific Division Finals against the Stockton Heat.

As a free agent at the conclusion of his contract with the Avalanche, Matteau opted to sign his first contract abroad after signing a two-year deal with Swedish club, Linköping HC of the Swedish Hockey League (SHL), on July 29, 2022. In his first European campaign, Matteau was slow to adapt with Linköping HC, registering just 1 assist through 16 games to start the 2022–23 season. After seeking a release from his contract in the SHL, Matteau left to sign for the remainder of the season with German club, ERC Ingolstadt of the DEL, on November 17, 2022.

At the conclusion of his contract with Ingolstadt, Matteau returned to North America as a free agent. On September 6, 2023, Matteau rejoined the Columbus Blue Jackets organization in accepting a professional tryout contract to attend training camp for the 2023–24 season. After participating through the pre-season with the Blue Jackets, Matteau was re-assigned to continue his tryout with the Cleveland Monsters in the AHL to begin the season.

Limited through injury in his second season with the Monsters, Matteau retired while as the Captain of the Monsters on May 12, 2025.

== International play ==
Matteau represented United States at the 2014 World Junior Ice Hockey Championships.

== Personal life ==
Matteau is the son of former NHL player Stéphane Matteau, who is known for scoring the double overtime game seven goal for the New York Rangers in the Eastern Conference Finals against the New Jersey Devils in the 1994 playoffs. His sister, Alyson Matteau played professionally for the NWHL's Buffalo Beauts, after captaining the University of Maine Black Bears.

Matteau was born in Chicago, when his father was a member of the Chicago Blackhawks, and lived in New York City, St. Louis, Silicon Valley and South Florida during his father's career, before his family settled in the Montreal area.

== Career statistics ==
=== Regular season and playoffs ===
			Regular season					Playoffs
Season	Team	League	GP	G	A	Pts	PIM	GP	G	A	Pts	PIM
2010–11	U.S. NTDP Juniors	USHL	28	4	5	9	47	2	0	0	0	2
2010–11	U.S. NTDP U17	USDP	47	7	11	18	67	—	—	—	—	—
2011–12	U.S. NTDP Juniors	USHL	18	6	4	10	93	—	—	—	—	—
2010–11	U.S. NTDP U18	USDP	46	15	17	32	166	—	—	—	—	—
2012–13	Blainville–Boisbriand Armada	QMJHL	35	18	10	28	70	11	3	6	9	16
2012–13	New Jersey Devils	NHL	17	1	2	3	6	—	—	—	—	—
2013–14	Albany Devils	AHL	67	13	13	26	66	4	1	0	1	4
2014–15	Albany Devils	AHL	61	12	15	27	40	—	—	—	—	—
2014–15	New Jersey Devils	NHL	7	1	0	1	4	—	—	—	—	—
2015–16	New Jersey Devils	NHL	20	1	0	1	13	—	—	—	—	—
2015–16	Albany Devils	AHL	1	0	0	0	4	—	—	—	—	—
2015–16	Montreal Canadiens	NHL	12	0	1	1	4	—	—	—	—	—
2016–17	St. John's IceCaps	AHL	67	12	13	25	122	4	3	1	4	2
2017–18	Chicago Wolves	AHL	60	15	12	27	57	3	0	1	1	4
2017–18	Vegas Golden Knights	NHL	8	0	1	1	0	—	—	—	—	—
2018–19	Chicago Wolves	AHL	55	5	8	13	78	21	3	5	8	22
2019–20	Cleveland Monsters	AHL	50	12	16	28	41	—	—	—	—	—
2019–20	Columbus Blue Jackets	NHL	9	2	1	3	5	—	—	—	—	—
2020–21	Columbus Blue Jackets	NHL	18	1	0	1	9	—	—	—	—	—
2021–22	Colorado Avalanche	NHL	1	0	0	0	0	—	—	—	—	—
2021–22	Colorado Eagles	AHL	20	3	7	10	32	9	3	0	3	10
2022–23	Linköping HC	SHL	16	0	1	1	18	—	—	—	—	—
2022–23	ERC Ingolstadt	DEL	19	10	10	20	9	16	4	4	8	18
2023–24	Cleveland Monsters	AHL	15	2	4	6	29	14	1	6	7	6
2024–25	Cleveland Monsters	AHL	15	2	5	7	8	—	—	—	—	—
NHL totals			92	6	5	11	41	—	—	—	—	—

=== International ===
Year	Team	Event	Result	GP	G	A	Pts	PIM
2011	United States	U17	2nd place, silver medalist(s)	5	2	3	5	2
2014	United States	WJC	5th	5	3	1	4	10
Junior totals				10	5	4	9	12

Awards and achievements
Preceded by Adam Larsson	New Jersey Devils first-round draft pick 2012	Succeeded by John Quenneville
