= Michal Pivoňka =

Czech ice hockey player

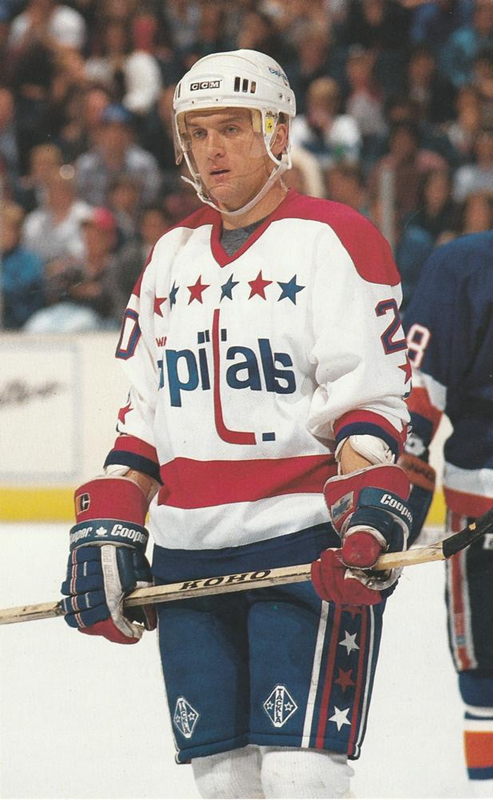
- Born: 28 January 1966 (age 60) Kladno, Czechoslovakia
- Height: 6 ft 2 in (188 cm)
- Weight: 198 lb (90 kg; 14 st 2 lb)
- Position: Centre
- Shot: Left
- Played for: HC Dukla Jihlava; Washington Capitals; Klagenfurter AC
- National team: Czechoslovakia
- NHL draft: 59th overall, 1984; Washington Capitals
- Playing career: 1984–2000

Michal Pivoňka (born 28 January 1966) is a Czech former professional ice hockey player. He played his entire National Hockey League (NHL) career with the Washington Capitals. Selected by the Capitals in the 1984 NHL entry draft, Pivoňka defected to the United States during the summer of 1986. Over his 13 seasons with the Capitals, Pivoňka tallied 181 goals and 418 assists for a total of 599 points. At his retirement, he held the title for most assists in franchise history. As of 2025, he ranks fourth behind John Carlson, Nicklas Bäckström, and Alexander Ovechkin.

== Early life ==
Pivoňka was born on 28 January 1966, in Kladno, Czechoslovakia, to Magdalena and Lubomir Pivoňka. He came from a middle-class family in Czechoslovakia as his father was a track and field coach and his mother was a secretary.

== Career ==
=== Defecting from Czechoslovakia ===
As a teenager, Pivoňka played hockey full-time in Prague while officially being employed by a local steel company. His salary of 45,600 koruna a year officially came from his employment with the steel company. However, his salary significantly decreased when he was conscripted into the Czechoslovak Army. Due to the mandatory conscription rules, Pivoňka spent two seasons with the Army team Dukla-Jihlava. Despite remaining in Czechoslovakia, Pivoňka gained the attention of teams from the National Hockey League and was heavily pursued by the Washington Capitals.

After finding out from a Czech coach that he had been drafted in the 1984 NHL entry draft by the Capitals, Pivoňka became determined to defect to the United States and play in the NHL. Pivoňka first met with Capitals scout Jack Button in August 1984 at a hunting lodge in northern Sweden. His numerous meetings with Button happened in secret due to Czechoslovakia's tendency to reject young players' permission to play in North America. If he had been caught defecting, or seeking to defect, he would have been sent to prison. In his final meeting with Capitals executives, Button handed Pivoňka a split-up $5 bill and told him not to talk with anyone claiming to be associated with the club unless they had the other half.

Despite being drafted in 1984, Pivoňka remained in Czechoslovakia for another two years to finish his army term and leave with his fiance Renata. Due to the dangers of being caught, Pivoňka was unable to inform his family of his decision before leaving. On 7 July 1986, Pivoňka and Renata left Prague, telling their families they were going on vacation in Yugoslavia, where they secretly met with a contact who helped them cross the border to rural Italy. After meeting with Washington Capitals executives, Pivoňka and Renata then visited the Embassy of the United States in Rome and were granted tentative refugee status in the United States almost immediately. As he would not receive his first paycheque until 15 October 1986, Pivoňka and Renata rented a two-bedroom apartment and bought a car using money from his signing bonuses. In the end, the main repercussion Pivoňka's family suffered as a result of his defection was that his father was demoted from head coach to assistant coach of track and field.

=== Washington Capitals ===
Pivoňka immediately made an impact upon joining the Capitals for the 1986–87 season by scoring four goals and five assists through his first nine games. His first NHL goal came on 14 October 1986 in a 7–6 win over the New York Rangers. As a result of his overall play, Pivoňka was the runner up for the NHL's Rookie of the Month of October. By the start of November 1986, Pivoňka led the Capitals in scoring with 14 points through 14 games and ranked second among all rookies. However, as the NHL season was longer than the Czechoslovakia one, his production soon began to dip. After adding only three goals and four assists to his points total by the end of November, head coach Bryan Murray said Pivoňka was playing "like the rookie I thought he would start out as." In an effort to improve his play, the Capitals coaching staff moved Pivoňka from center to left wing in January 1987. Shortly after scoring his 17th goal of the season, Pivoňka suffered an ankle injury in a game against the Boston Bruins on 7 March and missed a few games to recover. Despite this, Pivoňka finished his rookie regular-season with 18 goals and 25 assists to rank eighth among rookies in scoring. As the Capitals qualified for the 1987 Stanley Cup playoffs, Pivoňka participated in the Game 7 Patrick Division semifinals game against the New York Islanders. Nicknamed the Easter Epic, it was the longest Game 7 in Stanley Cup playoff history and required four overtimes to decide the winner. Pivoňka finished the playoffs with one goal and one assist over seven games.

However, Pivoňka struggled to match his rookie total in his sophomore season and finished the 1987–88 season with 11 goals and 23 assists. After he similarly struggled through the first 14 games of the 1988–89 season, Pivoňka was re-assigned to the Capitals American Hockey League (AHL) affiliate, the Baltimore Skipjacks, in early November. He made an immediate impact with the Skipjacks by recording two points, including the game-winning goal, in his first game with the team.

The arrival of Peter Bondra to the Capitals in the 1990–91 season resulted in back-to-back career highs for Pivoňka. While playing alongside Bondra and Dmitri Khristich, Pivoňka finished the regular-season with a career-high 70 points and tied Kevin Hatcher for the team lead in assists. Despite his career-high in points, Pivoňka experienced a lengthy scoring drought during the season that resulted in 14 games without a goal. This streak was broken on 11 January 1991 with two goals and an assist against the Calgary Flames. Pivoňka's efforts helped the Capitals qualify for the 1991 Stanley Cup playoffs, where they faced the New York Rangers in the first round. Despite suffering what team dentist Howard Salob described as "the worst injury I've seen" in Game 3, Pivoňka finished the series with four points over six games.

While Pivoňka started the 1991–92 season separated from Bondra, the two were reunited on a line with Khristich by the end of October 1991. Before their reunification, Pivoňka had tallied five goals and 10 assists for 15 points. As the trio remained the Capitals' top offensive line through November, Pivoňka quickly added three goals and eight assists to his points total. Their efforts helped the Capitals maintain a winning record and lead the league. Pivoňka recorded his first NHL hat-trick in an 8–6 loss to the New York Rangers on 26 December 1991. Pivoňka remained Bondra's linemate for the entirety of the season, which helped him lead the team in scoring with 23 goals and 57 assists. He continued his scoring prowess through the Capitals' first round series against the Pittsburgh Penguins in the 1992 Stanley Cup playoffs. After tallying one goal and three assists in Game 2, he finished the series with six points through seven games. Following the playoffs, Pivoňka and the Capitals settled their contract dispute that had arisen in March. Pivoňka and Bondra had accused the Capitals of misleading them when they signed their initial contract with the team and their new agent wanted their contracts voided. In the end, the Capitals signed Pivoňka to a $700,000 contract in the summer of 1992.

Pivoňka struggled to match his 80-point total in the 1992–93 NHL season due to an early season injury that resulted in 15 missed games. After missing three games in early October with an injury, Pivoňka returned to the Capitals lineup on 21 October against the New York Rangers. However, he reaggravated his injury in the first period and missed the remainder of October and November. Once he recovered, Pivoňka was reunited on the "Euroline" with Bondra and Khristich and quickly amassed 40 points over 30 games. Pivoňka tallied three goals and three assists on a four-game road trip in February 1993 to help the Capitals set a new franchise record for consecutive road wins.

Under new head coach Jim Schoenfeld, the Capitals finished the 1993–94 season in third place and faced off against the Penguins in the 1994 Stanley Cup playoffs. Pivoňka scored an empty-net goal in Game 6 to send the Capitals to the second round against the New York Rangers. However, Pivoňka and Bondra were both sidelined with injuries during the second round series and the Capitals fell to the Rangers in five games.

During Game 7 of the 1995 Eastern Conference quarterfinals, Pivoňka was suspended for the first three games of the 1995–96 season and fined $1,000 for high-sticking defenseman Kjell Samuelsson. However, Pivoňka and Bondra missed the first few games of the 1995–96 season anyways due to contract disputes with the Capitals. As a result, they both played with the Detroit Vipers of the International Hockey League (IHL) until their disputes were resolved. It was reported that Pivoňka was seeking a five-year, $7.5 million contract with the Capitals. Pivoňka scored one goal and nine assists with the Vipers before signing a multi-year contract with the Capitals on 20 October. Although he signed with the Capitals, Pivoňka was forced to miss the next three games due to his suspension the previous season. Upon returning to the Capitals lineup, Pivoňka and Bondra were reunited on a line and immediately overtook the team lead in scoring. By December, Pivoňka had amassed 22 points through 20 games and earned continuous praise from teammates and coaching staff. On 22 December 1995, Pivoňka recorded his 500th NHL point with an assist on Steve Konowalchuk's power-play goal. As the duo continued to garner attention around the league for their play, sportswriter Jim Kelley referred to the pairing as "magic" and compared them to the French Connection. While playing alongside Bondra, Pivoňka finished the 1995–96 season leading the team with 65 assists and 81 points.

Pivoňka and Bondra were joined by Jason Allison on the Capitals first line to start the 1996–97 season. Before suffering a knee injury at the end of October, Pivoňka had tallied two goals and three assists. While the injury was originally not considered to be serious, it was later revealed that Pivoňka would miss four to six weeks to recover. He struggled in his return to the Capitals lineup and scored one goal in his first 11 games back. His slow scoring began to raise concerns with vice president and general manager David Poile, who said: "We're not going anywhere unless Michal Pivonka gets better." In part due to his struggles, Pivoňka was moved off of a line with Bondra and began playing with Dale Hunter and Kelly Miller in January 1997. On 13 January 1997, Pivoňka tallied his 400th career NHL assist to help lift the Capitals to a win over the Toronto Maple Leafs. In another effort to improve his production, Pivoňka was shifted from centre to a winger position alongside Steve Konowalchuk and Joé Juneau. He quickly found success as a winger and tallied one goal and nine assists over 12 games. He finished the season with seven goals and 16 assists for a career-low 23 points.

Pivoňka suffered another injury near the start of the 1997–98 season which resulted in numerous missed games. While the Capitals chose to protect Pivoňka from the 1998 NHL expansion draft, he would play only 36 more games with them before retiring.

=== Kansas City Blades and retirement ===
As the Capitals struggled to trade Pivoňka due to his expensive contract, they assigned him to the Kansas City Blades of the IHL for the 1999–2000 season. As he retired following the 1999–2000 season, Pivoňka finished his NHL career with 181 goals and 418 assists through 825 games. At his retirement, he held the title for most assists in franchise history. As of 2025, he ranks fourth behind John Carlson, Nicklas Bäckström, and Alexander Ovechkin.

== Career statistics ==
=== Regular season and playoffs ===
			Regular season					Playoffs
Season	Team	League	GP	G	A	Pts	PIM	GP	G	A	Pts	PIM
1983–84	Poldi SONP Kladno	CZE II	34	15	13	28	19	—	—	—	—	—
1984–85	ASD Dukla Jihlava	TCH	33	8	11	19	18	—	—	—	—	—
1985–86	ASD Dukla Jihlava	TCH	42	5	13	18	18	—	—	—	—	—
1986–87	Washington Capitals	NHL	73	18	25	43	41	7	1	1	2	2
1987–88	Washington Capitals	NHL	71	11	23	34	28	14	4	9	13	4
1988–89	Baltimore Skipjacks	AHL	31	12	24	36	19	—	—	—	—	—
1988–89	Washington Capitals	NHL	52	8	19	27	30	6	3	1	4	10
1989–90	Washington Capitals	NHL	77	25	39	64	54	11	0	2	2	6
1990–91	Washington Capitals	NHL	79	20	50	70	34	11	2	3	5	8
1991–92	Washington Capitals	NHL	80	23	57	80	47	7	1	5	6	13
1992–93	Washington Capitals	NHL	69	23	51	74	66	6	0	2	2	0
1993–94	Washington Capitals	NHL	82	14	36	50	38	7	4	4	8	4
1994–95	EC KAC	AUT	7	2	4	6	4	—	—	—	—	—
1994–95	Washington Capitals	NHL	46	10	23	33	50	7	1	4	5	21
1995–96	Detroit Vipers	IHL	7	1	9	10	19	—	—	—	—	—
1995–96	Washington Capitals	NHL	73	16	65	81	36	6	3	2	5	18
1996–97	Washington Capitals	NHL	54	7	16	23	22	—	—	—	—	—
1997–98	Washington Capitals	NHL	33	3	6	9	20	13	0	3	3	0
1998–99	Washington Capitals	NHL	36	5	6	11	12	—	—	—	—	—
1999–2000	Kansas City Blades	IHL	52	16	34	50	38	—	—	—	—	—
NHL totals			825	181	418	599	478	95	19	36	55	86

=== International ===
Year	Team	Event	GP	G	A	Pts	PIM
1983	Czechoslovakia	EJC	5	4	5	9	14
1984	Czechoslovakia	EJC	5	3	4	7	2
1984	Czechoslovakia	WJC	7	1	2	3	0
1985	Czechoslovakia	WJC	7	9	4	13	14
1985	Czechoslovakia	WC	10	0	1	1	0
1986	Czechoslovakia	WJC	7	5	5	10	10
1986	Czechoslovakia	WC	10	2	1	3	6
1991	Czechoslovakia	CC	5	0	3	3	2
Junior totals			31	22	20	42	40
Senior totals			25	2	5	7	8

== Personal life ==
Pivoňka and his wife Renata have three children together. Their son Jacob also plays ice hockey and was drafted by the New York Islanders in the 2018 NHL entry draft.

== Awards and honors ==
- Directorate Award (Best Forward) and All-Star Selection, 1985 World Junior Ice Hockey Championships
