= Canucks–Flames rivalry =

National Hockey League rivalry

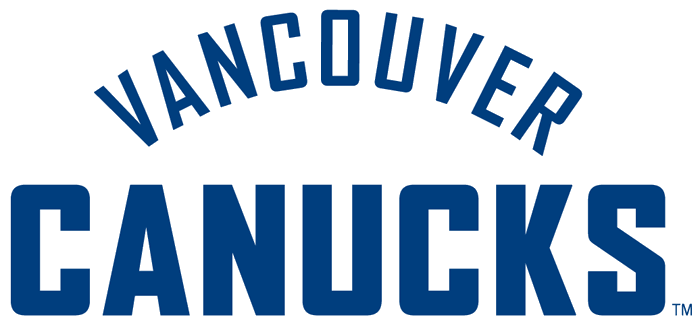
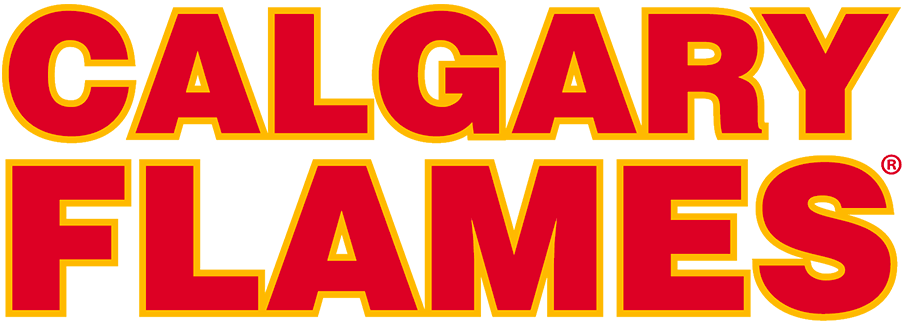
- Vancouver Canucks Calgary Flames
- First meeting: February 1, 1981
- Latest meeting: October 3, 2026
- Next meeting: December 26, 2026

Statistics
- Total meetings: 311
- All-time series: 158–107–26–20 (CGY) (Note: This does not include the Flames' 18–13–7–0 record against Vancouver as the Atlanta Flames)
- Regular season series: 137–90–26–20 (CGY)
- Postseason results: 21–17 (CGY)
- Largest victory: VAN 11–0 CGY; March 1, 1992
- Longest win streak: VAN W9
- Current win streak: VAN W3

Postseason history
- 1982 division semifinals: Canucks won, 3–0; 1983 division semifinals: Flames won, 3–1; 1984 division semifinals: Flames won, 3–1; 1989 division semifinals: Flames won, 4–3; 1994 conference quarterfinals: Canucks won, 4–3; 2004 conference quarterfinals: Flames won, 4–3; 2015 first round: Flames won, 4–2

The Canucks–Flames rivalry is a National Hockey League (NHL) rivalry between the Vancouver Canucks and the Calgary Flames. The Canucks started play in the 1970–71 season as an expansion team and the Flames started play during the 1980–81 season as a relocated team from Atlanta (Atlanta Flames). This rivalry is notable in that both teams have played each other in three overtime game sevens in the playoffs, second only in the NHL to the St. Louis Blues and Minnesota North Stars/Dallas Stars.

== History ==
The Canucks and Flames first met in the first round of postseason play in 1982, which was the first playoff series victory by the Canucks, en route to the Stanley Cup Final. The teams then met in 1983, 1984, during the Flames' championship season of 1988–89, and 1994, with Calgary holding a one game lead. The latter two series were decided in seven games by overtime goals (Joel Otto for Calgary and Pavel Bure for Vancouver) and coincidentally both managed to reach the Stanley Cup Final during those seasons (with Calgary winning the Stanley Cup in 1989).

It was during the 2003–04 season when the rivalry re-ignited, with the Canucks and Flames constantly battling for the top spot in the Northwest Division along with the Colorado Avalanche. When Canucks captain Markus Näslund and Flames captain Jarome Iginla developed into two of that era's greatest players, the rivalry became one of which team had the better overall leader. Between the beginning of the century and Näslund's departure from the Canucks in 2008, the spotlight would often be featured on both he and Iginla whenever the teams matched up. During the 2001–02 season, the two found themselves competing for the Art Ross Trophy for the league's highest point scorer. The following year, both players were featured in a Nike commercial promoting the rivalry between them.

These two teams met again during the first round of the 2004 postseason, and, just like in 1989 and 1994, the series-winning goal was scored in overtime in game seven, this time by Calgary's Martin Gélinas (who incidentally was a member of the 1993–94 Canucks team that reached the Stanley Cup Final). The Flames advanced to the Stanley Cup Final, becoming the first Canadian team to reach that far since the 1993–94 Canucks. However, unlike 1989, but alike Vancouver in 1994 by the New York Rangers, they were defeated by the Lightning in seven games.

The two teams reignited the rivalry on January 18, 2014, at Rogers Arena when the game started with a line brawl after the opening faceoff. Flames coach Bob Hartley started his fourth line that included tough guys Brian McGrattan and Kevin Westgarth. Interpreting it as a danger to his usual first line, Canucks coach John Tortorella sent his own fourth line onto the ice in response. As soon as the puck dropped, all ten skaters on the ice paired up and began fighting. It lasted several minutes before the referees got it under control with eight players being ejected including Canucks forward Kellan Lain who was playing in his first NHL game. While the players fought, Tortorella and Hartley had a heated verbal exchange across the benches. During the first intermission, Tortorella angrily confronted the Flames in the hallway and continued to berate them as they went to their dressing room before players and staff from both teams broke it up. The Canucks would end up winning the game 3–2 in a shootout. Tortorella was ultimately suspended for 15 days following the incident due to his actions.

In 2015, the two teams met in the playoffs for the first time since 2004. Game two of this series saw multiple fights break out with 1:17 left in the third period resulting in a total of 132 penalty minutes. Deryk Engelland of the Flames was given the instigation penalty as well as three game misconducts. However, the League retracted the penalty and instead fined Bob Hartley $50,000 for instigating the fight. The Canucks would win the game 4–1, but it was the Flames who came out victorious in the series, winning in six games.

Later that year, enforcers Micheal Ferland (Flames) and Derek Dorsett (Canucks) fought immediately after the opening faceoff of the 2015–16 season. The Flames' Brandon Bollig and Canucks' Brandon Prust squared off eight minutes later.

A few years later, in the opener of the 2018–19 season, Calgary's Travis Hamonic fought Vancouver's Erik Gudbranson after the latter made an open-ice hit on Flames rookie Dillon Dube, who was playing in his NHL debut. Hamonic suffered a facial fracture and was placed on IR, but returned later in October.

The teams faced each other 10 times during the 2020–21 season, as members of the North Division. That season marked the most-ever regular season meetings between the two teams. The Flames won seven of the games and the Canucks won three.

== See also ==
- List of NHL rivalries
