= Darcy Wakaluk =

Canadian ice hockey player

- Born: March 14, 1966 (age 60) Pincher Creek, Alberta, Canada
- Height: 5 ft 11 in (180 cm)
- Weight: 180 lb (82 kg; 12 st 12 lb)
- Position: Goaltender
- Caught: Left
- Played for: Buffalo Sabres; Minnesota North Stars; Dallas Stars; Phoenix Coyotes
- NHL draft: 144th overall, 1984; Buffalo Sabres
- Playing career: 1986–1997

Darcy Wakaluk (born March 14, 1966) is a Canadian former professional ice hockey goaltender who played in the National Hockey League from 1988 to 1997.

Wakaluk played for the WHL's Kelowna Wings and Spokane Chiefs. After being drafted by the Buffalo Sabres, Wakaluk then spent part of 5 seasons with the Rochester Americans of the AHL, winning the Calder Cup Championship in his first year (1986–87) and reaching the Finals once again in 1989-90.

On December 6, 1987, Wakaluk became the first American Hockey League goaltender to score a goal when he shot the puck the length of the ice into an empty net in a game with Rochester against Utica. Two days later, Ron Hextall of the Philadelphia Flyers would accomplish the same feat becoming the first NHL goalie to score a goal by shooting the puck, also shooting into an empty net (Billy Smith had been credited with a goal a few years earlier, but it had been an instance of an opposing player accidentally shooting the puck into his own empty net). Darcy would go on to be inducted into the Rochester Americans Hall of Fame in 2012.

He was selected 144th overall by the Buffalo Sabres in the 7th round of the 1984 NHL entry draft and started playing for them in the 1988–89 season, where he appeared in six games. He played another 16 games (and 2 playoff contests) with Buffalo in 1990-91 until being traded to the Minnesota North Stars for Buffalo's 1991 8th round pick and future considerations on May 26, 1991.

He played for the North Stars for two seasons, and subsequently the Dallas Stars, after the North stars had relocated to Texas, where, after taking over starting duties from Andy Moog at the beginning the 1994 playoffs, he swept the St. Louis Blues in Round One, winning the last game ever played at St. Louis Arena. In 1996, he was signed as a free agent by the Phoenix Coyotes, where he played his final season after a career-ending knee injury in a game against the Washington Capitals in January 1997 forced his retirement.

Since retiring Darcy has been a Goaltending Coach for four teams in the WHL and another in the AJHL. He spent 9 seasons as Goaltending Coach with the Calgary Hitmen, (where he won a WHL Championship in 2010 while coaching a young future NHL star netminder Martin Jones), previously with the Vancouver Giants, Crowsnest Pass Timberwolves, Kamloops Blazers, and most recently with the Lethbridge Hurricanes.

== Career statistics ==
=== Regular season and playoffs ===
			Regular season									Playoffs
Season	Team	League	GP	W	L	T	MIN	GA	SO	GAA	SV%	GP	W	L	MIN	GA	SO	GAA	SV%
1982–83	Pincher Creek Oilers	AAHA	38	—	—	—	2280	116	0	3.05	—	—	—	—	—	—	—	—	—
1983–84	Kelowna Wings	WHL	31	2	22	0	1555	163	0	6.29	.836	—	—	—	—	—	—	—	—
1984–85	Kelowna Wings	WHL	54	19	30	4	3094	244	0	4.73	—	5	1	4	282	22	0	4.68	—
1985–86	Spokane Chiefs	WHL	47	21	22	1	2562	224	1	5.25	—	—	—	—	—	—	—	—	—
1986–87	Flint Spirits	IHL	9	—	—	—	—	—	—	—	—	—	—	—	—	—	—	—	—
1986–87	Rochester Americans	AHL	11	2	2	0	545	26	0	2.86	.910	5	2	0	141	11	0	4.68	—
1987–88	Rochester Americans	AHL	55	27	16	3	2763	159	0	3.45	.881	6	3	3	328	22	0	4.02	.852
1988–89	Buffalo Sabres	NHL	6	1	3	0	214	15	0	4.21	.833	—	—	—	—	—	—	—	—
1988–89	Rochester Americans	AHL	33	11	14	0	1566	97	1	3.72	.869	—	—	—	—	—	—	—	—
1989–90	Rochester Americans	AHL	56	31	16	4	3095	173	2	3.35	.883	17	10	6	1001	50	0	3.01	—
1990–91	Buffalo Sabres	NHL	16	4	5	3	630	35	0	3.32	.880	2	0	1	37	2	0	3.24	.909
1990–91	Rochester Americans	AHL	26	10	10	3	1363	68	4	2.99	.900	9	6	3	544	30	0	3.31	—
1991–92	Minnesota North Stars	NHL	36	13	19	1	1905	104	1	3.28	.881	—	—	—	—	—	—	—	—
1991–92	Kalamazoo Wings	IHL	1	1	0	0	60	7	0	7.00	—	—	—	—	—	—	—	—	—
1992–93	Minnesota North Stars	NHL	29	10	12	5	1596	97	1	3.65	.879	—	—	—	—	—	—	—	—
1993–94	Dallas Stars	NHL	36	18	9	6	2000	88	3	2.64	.910	5	4	1	307	15	0	2.93	.911
1994–95	Dallas Stars	NHL	15	4	8	0	754	40	2	3.18	.883	1	0	0	20	1	0	3.00	.889
1995–96	Dallas Stars	NHL	37	9	16	5	1875	106	1	3.39	.891	—	—	—	—	—	—	—	—
1996–97	Phoenix Coyotes	NHL	16	8	3	1	789	39	1	2.99	.899	—	—	—	—	—	—	—	—
NHL totals			191	67	75	21	9756	524	9	3.22	.889	8	4	2	364	18	0	2.97	.910
