= Alyson Matteau =

Canadian-American ice hockey player

- Born: December 17, 1997 (age 28) San Jose, California, U.S.
- Height: 178 cm (5 ft 10 in)
- Position: Defence
- Shot: Left
- Played for: Maine Black Bears; Buffalo Beauts
- National team: Canada
- Playing career: 2015–2021

Alyson Matteau (born December 17, 1997) is an American-born Canadian former ice hockey defender, who last played for the Buffalo Beauts of the National Women's Hockey League (NWHL). She is currently the second all-time leading scorer among University of Maine women's ice hockey defenders.

== Playing career ==
From the age of 12 until she was 16, she played for the junior Québec provincial girls' hockey team. In high school, she played for Northwood School in Lake Placid, New York.

From 2015 to 2019, she attended the University of Maine and played with the Maine Black Bears women's ice hockey team, scoring 61 points in 135 NCAA Division I games and serving as team captain in her senior year. She scored her first career collegiate goal against Brown University in October 2015, and was named to the Hockey East All-Rookie team that season. She was named to the Hockey East Second All-Star Team for the 2017-18 season.

She signed her first professional contract with the NWHL's Buffalo Beauts ahead of the 2020–21 NWHL season.

== International play ==
Matteau represented Canada at the 2015 IIHF World Women's U18 Championship, playing all five games as the country won silver.

== Personal life ==
Matteau is the daughter of former NHL winger and 1994 Stanley Cup winner Stéphane Matteau and Nathalie Guertin. She was born in San Jose, California after her father signed with the San Jose Sharks before the 1997–98 NHL season. Her older brother, Stefan, was a first round draft pick in the 2012 NHL entry draft and currently plays in the American Hockey League (AHL).

For her bachelor's degree, she majored in Child Development and Family Relations at the University of Maine.
