= Stéphane Matteau =

Canadian ice hockey player (born 1969)

- Born: September 2, 1969 (age 56) Rouyn-Noranda, Quebec, Canada
- Height: 6 ft 4 in (193 cm)
- Weight: 220 lb (100 kg; 15 st 10 lb)
- Position: Left wing
- Shot: Left
- Played for: Calgary Flames; Chicago Blackhawks; New York Rangers; St. Louis Blues; San Jose Sharks; Florida Panthers
- NHL draft: 25th overall, 1987; Calgary Flames
- Playing career: 1989–2003

Stéphane Matteau (born September 2, 1969) is a Canadian former professional ice hockey player who played over 800 regular-season games in the National Hockey League (NHL). He was drafted in the second round, 25th overall, by the Calgary Flames in the 1987 NHL entry draft.

== Playing career ==
As a member of the New York Rangers 1994 Stanley Cup Championship team, Matteau scored two overtime goals in the Eastern Conference Final against the New Jersey Devils, including one that ended the series and became an iconic goal in Rangers lore. His first overtime goal ended game three at 6:13 of the second overtime in New Jersey giving the Rangers a 3–2 victory and a 2–1 series lead.

His second goal came at 4:24 of the second overtime of game seven at Madison Square Garden. Matteau scored off a wrap around that was intended for a pass to Esa Tikkanen, only to have it bounced off a stick on the left side of New Jersey's rookie goaltender Martin Brodeur, a play which has been immortalized by the dramatic play-by-play call of Rangers radio announcer Howie Rose:

Fetisov for the Devils plays it cross-ice, into the far corner. Matteau swoops in to intercept. Matteau behind the net, swings it in front, HE SCORES! MATTEAU! MATTEAU! MATTEAU! STEPHANE MATTEAU! AND THE RANGERS HAVE ONE MORE HILL TO CLIMB, BABY... BUT IT'S MOUNT VANCOUVER! THE RANGERS ARE HEADED TO THE FINALS!

He was traded from the Rangers to the St. Louis Blues for Ian Laperrière on 28 December 1995. He played for head coach Mike Keenan on four occasions; with the Blackhawks, Rangers, Blues, and Panthers.

Matteau finished his career in 2002–03 with the Florida Panthers and their minor league affiliate, the San Antonio Rampage, and had a career total 742 penalty minutes, 144 goals and 172 assists for 316 total points in 848 games.

Matteau also was a member of the Rouyn Quebec team that played in the Little League World Series in 1982 along with fellow NHL player and first overall pick in his draft, Pierre Turgeon.

== Personal life ==
Matteau served as an assistant coach with the Blainville-Boisbriand Armada of the QMJHL for two seasons.

Matteau has two children, Stefan and Alyson.

His son, Stefan was drafted 29th overall in the 2012 NHL entry draft by the New Jersey Devils, the team against which his father scored his famed goal in the 1994 Eastern Conference Final, while his daughter, Alyson played for the NWHL’s Buffalo Beauts, prior to the league ceasing operations.

Matteau represented Canada in the Little League World Series in 1982, along with former NHLer Pierre Turgeon.

== Career statistics ==
			Regular season					Playoffs
Season	Team	League	GP	G	A	Pts	PIM	GP	G	A	Pts	PIM
1985–86	Hull Olympiques	QMJHL	60	6	8	14	19	4	0	0	0	0
1985–86	Hull Olympiques	MC	—	—	—	—	—	5	0	0	0	5
1986–87	Hull Olympiques	QMJHL	69	27	48	75	113	8	3	7	10	8
1987–88	Hull Olympiques	QMJHL	57	17	40	57	179	18	5	14	19	94
1987–88	Hull Olympiques	MC	—	—	—	—	—	4	1	2	3	4
1988–89	Hull Olympiques	QMJHL	59	44	45	89	202	9	8	6	14	30
1988–89	Salt Lake Golden Eagles	IHL	—	—	—	—	—	9	0	4	4	13
1989–90	Salt Lake Golden Eagles	IHL	81	23	35	58	130	10	6	3	9	38
1990–91	Calgary Flames	NHL	78	15	19	34	93	5	0	1	1	0
1991–92	Calgary Flames	NHL	4	1	0	1	19	—	—	—	—	—
1991–92	Chicago Blackhawks	NHL	20	5	8	13	45	18	4	6	10	24
1992–93	Chicago Blackhawks	NHL	79	15	18	33	98	3	0	1	1	2
1993–94	Chicago Blackhawks	NHL	65	15	16	31	55	—	—	—	—	—
1993–94	New York Rangers	NHL	12	4	3	7	2	23	6	3	9	20
1994–95	New York Rangers	NHL	41	3	5	8	25	9	0	1	1	10
1995–96	New York Rangers	NHL	32	4	2	6	22	—	—	—	—	—
1995–96	St. Louis Blues	NHL	46	7	13	20	65	11	0	2	2	8
1996–97	St. Louis Blues	NHL	74	16	20	36	50	5	0	0	0	0
1997–98	San Jose Sharks	NHL	73	15	14	29	60	4	0	1	1	0
1998–99	San Jose Sharks	NHL	68	8	15	23	73	5	0	0	0	6
1999–00	San Jose Sharks	NHL	69	12	12	24	61	10	0	2	2	8
2000–01	San Jose Sharks	NHL	80	13	19	32	32	6	1	3	4	0
2001–02	San Jose Sharks	NHL	55	7	4	11	15	10	1	2	3	2
2002–03	San Antonio Rampage	AHL	3	0	0	0	4	—	—	—	—	—
2002–03	Florida Panthers	NHL	52	4	4	8	27	—	—	—	—	—
NHL totals			848	144	172	316	742	109	12	22	34	80
